= Sanit Wichitkriengkrai =

Thai former professional Muay Thai fighter

- Born: Sanit Rungthep; August 11, 1965 (age 61); Ban Pong, Ratchaburi province, Thailand
- Other names: Sanit Wichitkriangkrai
- Nickname: The Leaping Tiger (ไอ้เสือเผ่น)
- Height: 170 cm (5 ft 7 in)
- Division: Mini Flyweight; Flyweight; Super Flyweight; Bantamweight; Super Bantamweight; Featherweight; Super Featherweight
- Style: Muay Thai (Muay Tae)
- Stance: Southpaw

Other information
- Occupation: Muay Thai trainer

Sanit Rungthep (Thai: สานิตย์ รุ่งเทพ; born August 11, 1965), known professionally as Sanit Wichitkriengkrai (Thai: สานิตย์ วิชิตเกรียงไกร), is a Thai former professional Muay Thai fighter.

== Biography and career ==
Sanit started to train in Muay Thai in his native Ratchaburi province under the teaching of his uncle and father. He came to Bangkok for the first time in 1981 and was rapidly scouted. He became a popular fighter of the 1980s competing for the most powerful promoter of the time Songchai Rattanasuban. Nicknamed the "Leaping Tiger" due to the tiger tattoo on his chest, Sanit was known for his southpaw kicking technique. The most importnant rivalries os Sanit's career where against Samransak Muangsurin who he faced four times and Chanchai Sor.Tamarangsri who he faced five times. During his career Sanit defeated many notable champions such as Paruhatlek Sitchunthong, Phanrit Luksrirat, Bangkhlanoi Sor.Thanikul, Yoknoi Fairtex, Saengsakda Kittikasem, Phayannoi Sor Tasanee, Sakmongkol Sithchuchok or Superlek Sorn E-Sarn.

Sanit and Chanchai fought each other for the Lumpinee Stadium Bantamweight title twice, the first time on October 11, 1985, Chanchai won by decision. Sanit won the rematch on January 18, 1986, taking home the title. Chanchai was also the opponent in his retirement bout which happened on March 17, 1992, and saw Sanit win by decision.

On September 27, 1991, Sanit faced Therdkiat Sitthepitak in a fight for the vacant Lumpinee Stadium Featherweight title. He lost by decision.

In Thai, he is known by the nickname "ไอ้เสือเผ่น" (Ai Suea Phen; "the leaping tiger"), a name inspired by the large leaping tiger tattoo that dominates the center of his chest.

Sanit had regular issues with his shoulder which he dislocated numerous times including during his fight against Yoknoi Fairtex on December 19, 1986. These repeated injuries forced him out of competition for lengthy periods and precipitated his decision to retire.

After retiring, Sanit became a Muay Thai trainer in his native province. He teaches at the Sor.Singyu camp.

== Titles and accomplishments ==
- Lumpinee Stadium
  - 1986 Lumpinee Stadium Bantamweight (118 lbs) Champion

== Fight record ==
Muay Thai Record
Date	Result	Opponent	Event	Location	Method	Round	Time
1992-03-17	Win	(Thailand) Chanchai Sor.Tamarangsri	Lumpinee Stadium	Bangkok, Thailand	Decision	5	3:00
1992-02-28	Loss	(Thailand) Jaroenthong Kiatbanchong		Samut Prakan, Thailand	Decision	5	3:00
1992-02-07	Loss	(Thailand) Petchdam Lukborai	Onesongchai, Lumpinee Stadium	Bangkok, Thailand	Decision	5	3:00
1992-01-07	Win	(Thailand) Chanchai Sor.Tamarangsri	Onesongchai, Lumpinee Stadium	Bangkok, Thailand	Decision	5	3:00
1991-11-03	Loss	(Thailand) Namphon Nongkeepahuyuth	Onesongchai	New Zealand	Decision	5	3:00
1991-10-15	Loss	(Thailand) Namphon Nongkeepahuyuth	Onesongchai, Lumpinee Stadium	Bangkok, Thailand	Decision	5	3:00
1991-09-27	Loss	(Thailand) Therdkiat Sitthepitak	Lumpinee Stadium	Bangkok, Thailand	Decision	5	3:00
For the vacant Lumpinee Stadium Featherweight (126 lbs) title.
1991-08-17	Win	(Thailand) Superlek Sornisaan	Lumpinee Stadium	Bangkok, Thailand	Decision	5	3:00
1991-07-12	Win	(Thailand) Samingnoi Kiattikamchai	Lumpinee Stadium	Bangkok, Thailand	Decision	5	3:00
1991-06-27	Win	(Thailand) Sakmongkol Sithchuchok	Lumpinee Stadium	Bangkok, Thailand	Decision	5	3:00
1991-05-21	Win	(Thailand) Chumpuang Chomputhong	Lumpinee Stadium	Bangkok, Thailand	Decision	5	3:00
1991-03-05	Loss	(Thailand) Kamsanya Tor.Sitthichai	Lumpinee Stadium	Bangkok, Thailand	Decision	5	3:00
1991-02-12	Loss	(Thailand) Sakmongkol Sithchuchok	Lumpinee Stadium	Bangkok, Thailand	Decision	5	3:00
1991-01-21	Win	(Thailand) Boonchai Tor.Thuwanon	Lumpinee Stadium	Bangkok, Thailand	Decision	5	3:00
1990-12-07	Loss	(Thailand) Ritthichai Lookchaomaesaitong	Onesongchai, Lumpinee Stadium	Bangkok, Thailand	Decision	5	3:00
1990-11-02	Win	(Thailand) Samingnoi Kiattikamchai	Lumpinee Stadium	Bangkok, Thailand	Decision	5	3:00
1990-09-11	Draw	(Thailand) Laemphet Sor.Bodin		Thailand	Decision	5	3:00
1990-07-10	Loss	(Thailand) Dechsak Sakpradoo	Onesongchai, Lumpinee Stadium	Bangkok, Thailand	Decision	5	3:00
1989-11-19	Loss	(Thailand) Phanrit Luksrirat	Samrong Stadium	Samut Prakan, Thailand	Decision	5	3:00
1988-12-07	NC	(Thailand) Manasak Sor.Ploenchit	Rajadamnern Stadium	Bangkok, Thailand	Ref.stop (Sanit dismissed)	4	
1988-09-07	Loss	(Thailand) Sanphet Lukrangsi	Rajadamnern Stadium	Bangkok, Thailand	Decision	5	3:00
1988-08-05	Win	(Thailand) Yoknoi Fairtex	Fairtex, Lumpinee Stadium	Bangkok, Thailand	Decision	5	3:00
1988-07-18	Win	(Thailand) Wisanupon Saksamut	Rajadamnern Stadium	Bangkok, Thailand	Decision	5	3:00
1988-06-24	Win	(Thailand) Sanphet Lukrangsi	Rajadamnern Stadium	Bangkok, Thailand	Decision	5	3:00
1988-01-26	Loss	(Thailand) Namphon Nongkeepahuyuth	Yod Muay Lok, Lumpinee Stadium	Bangkok, Thailand	TKO (dislocated shoulder)	4	
1987-12-29	Loss	(Thailand) Samransak Muangsurin	Onesongchai, Lumpinee Stadium	Bangkok, Thailand	Decision	5	3:00
1987-12-08	Draw	(Thailand) Samransak Muangsurin	Onesongchai, Lumpinee Stadium	Bangkok, Thailand	Decision	5	3:00
1987-07-31	Loss	(Thailand) Bandon Sitbangprachan	Lumpinee Stadium	Bangkok, Thailand	TKO (dislocated shoulder)	2	
1987-06-19	Loss	(Thailand) Jomwo Chernyim	Onesongchai, Lumpinee Stadium	Bangkok, Thailand	Decision	5	3:00
1987-03-21	Loss	(Thailand) Yoknoi Fairtex	Onesongchai, Lumpinee Stadium	Bangkok, Thailand	Decision	5	3:00
1986-12-19	Loss	(Thailand) Yoknoi Fairtex	Kongtoranee Payakaroon vs Gilberto Roman, Huamark Stadium	Bangkok, Thailand	Decision	5	3:00
For the Lumpinee Stadium Featherweight (126 lbs) title.
1986-10-14	Win	(Thailand) Saengsakda Kittikasem	Onesongchai, Lumpinee Stadium	Bangkok, Thailand	Decision	5	3:00
1986-08-22	Win	(Thailand) Yoknoi Fairtex	Onesongchai, Lumpinee Stadium	Bangkok, Thailand	Decision	5	3:00
1986-07-18	Win	(Thailand) Samransak Muangsurin	Onesongchai, Lumpinee Stadium	Bangkok, Thailand	Decision	5	3:00
1986-06-13	Win	(Thailand) Phanrit Luksrirat	Chaomangkon + Onesongchai, Lumpinee Stadium	Bangkok, Thailand	Decision	5	3:00
Sanit stripped of the Lumpinee Stadium Bantamweight (118 lbs) title after missing weight.
1986-05-06	Loss	(Thailand) Bandon Sitbangprachan	Lumpinee Stadium	Bangkok, Thailand	Decision	5	3:00
1986-03-04	Loss	(Thailand) Chanchai Sor.Tamarangsri	Huamark Stadium	Bangkok, Thailand	Decision	5	3:00
1986-01-18	Win	(Thailand) Chanchai Sor.Tamarangsri	Samart Payakaroon vs Lupe Pintor, Huamark Stadium	Bangkok, Thailand	Decision	5	3:00
Wins the Lumpinee Stadium Bantamweight (118 lbs) title.
1985-12-06	Win	(Thailand) Samransak Muangsurin	Onesongchai, Lumpinee Stadium	Bangkok, Thailand	Decision	5	3:00
1985-11-05	Win	(Thailand) Maewnoi Sitchang	Onesongchai, Lumpinee Stadium	Bangkok, Thailand	Decision	5	3:00
1985-10-11	Loss	(Thailand) Chanchai Sor.Tamarangsri	Onesongchai, Lumpinee Stadium	Bangkok, Thailand	Decision	5	3:00
For the Lumpinee Stadium Bantamweight (118 lbs) title.
1985-09-03	Win	(Thailand) Bangkhlanoi Sor.Thanikul	Lumpinee Stadium	Bangkok, Thailand	Decision	5	3:00
1985-07-12	Win	(Thailand) Ruengsaknoi Por.Ped	Lumpinee Stadium	Bangkok, Thailand	Decision	5	3:00
1985-06-18	Win	(Thailand) Phanrit Luksrirat	Onesongchai, Lumpinee Stadium	Bangkok, Thailand	Decision	5	3:00
1985-05-10	Loss	(Thailand) Phanrit Luksrirat	Onesongchai, Lumpinee Stadium	Bangkok, Thailand	Decision	5	3:00
1985-04-16	Win	(Thailand) Paruhatlek Sitchunthong	Onesongchai, Lumpinee Stadium	Bangkok, Thailand	Decision	5	3:00
1985-04-02	Win	(Thailand) Songwannoi Sitsafan	Ruam Nam Chai Wongkai Muay, Lumpinee Stadium	Bangkok, Thailand	TKO	2	
1985-02-12	Win	(Thailand) Fahlan Lukphrabat	Chatuchok, Lumpinee Stadium	Bangkok, Thailand	Decision	5	3:00
1985-01-18	Win	(Thailand) Panthong Pitakthangluang	Lumpinee Stadium	Bangkok, Thailand	KO	2	
1984-12-25	Loss	(Thailand) Panthong Pitakthangluang	Chatuchok, Lumpinee Stadium	Bangkok, Thailand	Decision	5	3:00
1984-10-26	Win	(Thailand) Surapol Sor.Kiattisak	Fairtex, Lumpinee Stadium	Bangkok, Thailand	Decision	5	3:00
1983-11-19	Win	(Thailand) Suriyannoi Sor.Wongsiam		Thailand	Decision	5	3:0
1983-10-26	Loss	(Thailand) Baeber Lookchaomaechamadewi		Thailand	Decision	5	3:00
1983-09-03	Loss	(Thailand) Numnongkhai Sit Waiwat		Thailand	Decision	5	3:00
1983-08-05	Loss	(Thailand) Supernoi Sit Chokchai	Onesongchai, Lumpinee Stadium	Thailand	Decision	5	3:00
1983-07-06	Win	(Thailand) Baeber Lookchaomaechamadewi	Onesongchai, Lumpinee Stadium	Bangkok, Thailand	Decision	5	3:00
1983-06-22	Win	(Thailand) Sornnarai Sor.Thanikul		Saraburi province, Thailand	Decision	5	3:00
1983-06-07	Loss	(Thailand) Saencherng Pinsinchai	Onesongchai, Lumpinee Stadium	Bangkok, Thailand	Decision	5	3:00
1983-05-10	Win	(Thailand) Sornnarai Sor.Thanikul	Lumpinee Stadium	Bangkok, Thailand	Decision	5	3:00
1983-01-07	Loss	(Thailand) Supernoi Sit Chokchai	Onesongchai, Lumpinee Stadium	Bangkok, Thailand	Decision	5	3:00
1982-12-15	Win	(Thailand) Khiawanoi Pichitsuk		Thailand	Decision	5	3:00
1982-11-20	Win	(Thailand) Samannoi Sithichak		Thailand	Decision	5	3:00
1982-10-15	Draw	(Thailand) Kaopong Sit Mobol		Thailand	Decision	5	3:00
1982-09-06	Loss	(Thailand) Kaopong Sit Mobol		Thailand	Decision	5	3:00
1982-07-17	Loss	(Thailand) Intreelek Kiatsayan		Thailand	Decision	5	3:00
1982-06-22	Loss	(Thailand) Supernoi Sit Chokchai		Thailand	Decision	5	3:00
1982-05-27	Win	(Thailand) Kaopong Sit Mobol		Thailand	Decision	5	3:00
1982-04-30	Win	(Thailand) Intreelek Kiatsayan		Thailand	Decision	5	3:00
1982-03-02	Loss	(Thailand) Intreelek Kiatsayan		Thailand	Decision	5	3:00
1982-02-09	Win	(Thailand) Dekwat Lukphrabat	Lumpinee Stadium	Bangkok, Thailand	Decision	5	3:00
1981-11-17	Win	(Thailand) Mahawet Kiattisakthewan	Lumpinee Stadium	Bangkok, Thailand	Decision	5	3:00
1981-10-07	Draw	(Thailand) Chakrapetchnoi Sor.Ploenchit	Lumpinee Stadium	Bangkok, Thailand	Decision	5	3:00
Bangkok debut.
Legend: Win Loss Draw/No contest Notes
