= Bandon Sitbangprachan =

Thai former professional Muay Thai fighter

- Born: Nuea Misanthia; November 30, 1963 (age 62); Ban Lueam, Nakhon Ratchasima, Thailand
- Native name: บ้านดอน ศิษย์บางพระจันทร์
- Other names: Duea Lukbandon (เดือ ลูกบ้านดอน)
- Nickname: Mountain-Fist Man (ไอ้หมัดภูผา); Black Executioner of Korat (เพชรฆาตดำโคราช)
- Style: Muay Thai
- Stance: Southpaw
- Team: Sit Bangprachan

Nuea Misanthia (Thai: เหนือ มีสันเทียะ; Born November 30, 1963), known professionally as Bandon Sitbangprachan (Thai: บ้านดอน ศิษย์บางพระจันทร์), is a Thai former professional Muay Thai fighter. He is a former Lumpinee Stadium Featherweight Champion who fought during the 1980s.

== Biography and career ==
He started learning Muay Thai on his own, fighting locally about 30 times under the name Duea Lukbandon. He then met Sianhowong Sitbangphrachan, who helped train him and brought him back to fighting under the name Bandon Sitbangphrachan. At the Sitbangprachan gym he would train alongside fighters such as Pichit Sitbangprachan. Bandon had another 14 fights, with twelve wins, one draw and one loss before making his Bangkok debut for the Onesongchai promotion.

He fougt during the Golden Era of Muay Thai against many notable fighters including Samransak Muangsurin, Chanchai Sor.Tamarangsri, Petchdam Lukborai, Sanit Wichitkriengkrai and Coban Lookchaomaesaitong.

After retiring, Bandon went back to live as a farmer in his native province.

== Titles and honours ==
- Lumpinee Stadium
  - 1985 Lumpinee Stadium Featherweight (126 lbs) Champion

== Muay Thai record ==
Muay Thai Record (Incomplete)
Date	Result	Opponent	Event	Location	Method	Round	Time
1990-	Loss	(Thailand) Coban Lookchaomaesaitong	Lumpinee Stadium	Bangkok, Thailand	KO (Punches)	2	
For the vacant Lumpinee Stadium Lightweight (135 lbs) title.
1989-12-01	Win	(Thailand) Coban Lookchaomaesaitong		Ubon Ratchathani, Thailand	KO	4	
1989-10-08	Win	(Thailand) Khunphonnoi KiattavisukGym	Samrong Stadium	Samut Prakan, Thailand	KO	1	
1989-07-25	NC	(Thailand) Narongchai Thairungruang	Lumpinee Stadium	Bangkok, Thailand	Narongchai dismissed	4	
1988-11-03	Loss	(Thailand) Sanphet Lukrangsi	Rajadamnern Stadium	Bangkok, Thailand	Decision	5	3:00
1988-10-03	Win	(Thailand) Den SahakarnOsot	Yodnuamthong, Rajadamnern Stadium	Bangkok, Thailand	KO	2	
1988-09-09	Win	(Thailand) Saksit Muangsurin	Onesongchai, Lumpinee Stadium	Bangkok, Thailand	KO	1	
1988-07-21	Loss	(Thailand) Sanphet Lukrangsi	Rajadamnern Stadium	Bangkok, Thailand	Decision	5	3:00
1988-05-03	Loss	(Thailand) Thuanthong Lukdecha	Onesongchai, Lumpinee Stadium	Bangkok, Thailand	Decision	5	3:00
1987-12-29	Loss	(Thailand) Prasert Kittikasem	Lumpinee Stadium	Bangkok, Thailand	Decision	5	3:00
1987-11-27	Loss	(Thailand) Jomwo Chernyim	Onesongchai, Lumpinee Stadium	Bangkok, Thailand	KO (Punches)	2	
1987-09-22	Win	(Thailand) Samransak Muangsurin	Onesongchai, Lumpinee Stadium	Bangkok, Thailand	Decision	5	3:00
1987-07-31	Win	(Thailand) Sanit Wichitkriengkrai	100th Anniversary Chulalongkorn University, Lumpinee Stadium	Bangkok, Thailand	TKO (dislocated shoulder)	2	
1987-05-15	Win	(Thailand) Wanlop Narupai		Bangkok, Thailand	KO	5	
1987-03-19	Win	(Thailand) Aima Lukbanmao		Bangkok, Thailand	KO	4	
1987-02-06	Loss	(Thailand) Chanchai Sor.Tamarangsri	Lumpinee Stadium	Bangkok, Thailand	Decision	5	3:00
1986-12-19	NC	(Thailand) Palannoi Kiatanan	Huamark Stadium	Bangkok, Thailand	(Palanoi dismissed)	2	
1986-11-25	Win	(Thailand) Saengsakda Kittikasem	Onesongchai, Lumpinee Stadium	Bangkok, Thailand	KO (left hook)	2	
1986-10-16	Win	(Thailand) Aima Lukbanmao	Sanphasit Prasong Arena	Ubon Ratchathani province, Thailand	Decision	5	3:00
1986-07-29	Loss	(Thailand) Palannoi Kiatanan	Onesongchai, Lumpinee Stadium	Bangkok, Thailand	TKO	1	
Loses the Lumpinee Stadium Featherweight (126 lbs) title.
1986-05-30	Loss	(Thailand) Palannoi Kiatanan	Onesongchai, Lumpinee Stadium	Bangkok, Thailand	Decision	5	3:00
1986-05-06	Win	(Thailand) Sanit Wichitkriengkrai	Lumpinee Stadium	Bangkok, Thailand	Decision	5	3:00
1986-03-18	Loss	(Thailand) Saengsakda Kittikasem	Lumpinee Stadium	Bangkok, Thailand	KO	1	
1985-12-17	Win	(Thailand) Maewnoi Sitchang	Onesongchai, Lumpinee Stadium	Bangkok, Thailand	TKO (Punches)	2	
1985-11-05	Loss	(Thailand) Jongrak Lukprabaht	Onesongchai, Lumpinee Stadium	Bangkok, Thailand	Decision	5	3:00
1985-10-11	Win	(Thailand) Yoknoi Fairtex	Lumpinee Stadium	Bangkok, Thailand	Decision (Unanimous)	5	3:00
Wins the Lumpinee Stadium Featherweight (126 lbs) title.
1985-09-03	Draw	(Thailand) Yoknoi Fairtex	Lumpinee Stadium	Bangkok, Thailand	Decision	5	3:00
For the Lumpinee Stadium Featherweight (126 lbs) title.
1985-08-06	Win	(Thailand) Petchdam Lukborai	Lumpinee Stadium	Bangkok, Thailand	Decision	5	3:00
1985-06-18	Win	(Thailand) Kongdej Chor.Wirach	Onesongchai, Lumpinee Stadium	Bangkok, Thailand	KO	2	
1985-05-31	Win	(Thailand) Palannoi Kiatanan	Lumpinee Stadium	Bangkok, Thailand	KO	5	
1985-04-30	Loss	(Thailand) Kongdej Chor.Wirach	Lumpinee Stadium	Bangkok, Thailand	Decision	5	3:00
1985-03-29	Win	(Thailand) Daengnoi Lukprabat	Lumpinee Stadium	Bangkok, Thailand	TKO		
1985-02-06	Win	(Thailand) Siyok JockyGym	Lumpinee Stadium	Bangkok, Thailand	Decision	5	3:00
1985-01-04	Win	(Thailand) Phayaphueng Ekmit	Rajadamnern Stadium	Bangkok, Thailand	KO	3	
1984-11-30	Win	(Thailand) Phayaphueng Ekmit		Bangkok, Thailand	Decision	5	3:00
1984-10-26	Win	(Thailand) Portanong Phetcharoen	Fairtex, Lumpinee Stadium	Bangkok, Thailand	Decision	5	3:00
1984-09-25	Win	(Thailand) Saksing Sitchuchon		Bangkok, Thailand	Decision	5	3:00
1984-08-31	Win	(Thailand) Phanpet Kiatkonsong	Lumpinee Stadium	Bangkok, Thailand	KO	2	
1984-07-28	Draw	(Thailand) Siyok JockyGym		Bangkok, Thailand	Decision	5	3:00
Legend: Win Loss Draw/No contest Notes

== Professional boxing record ==
2 fights	2 wins	0 losses
By knockout	2	0

No.	Result	Record	Opponent	Type	Round, time	Date	Location	Notes
1	Win	2–0	Petchdam Lukborai	KO	5 (6)	30 May 1989	Lumpinee Stadium, Bangkok, Thailand	
1	Win	1–0	Chainarong Sit-Omnoi	TKO	5 (6)	6 Jul 1984	Bangkok, Thailand	
