= Panomtuanlek Hapalang =

Thai former professional Muay Thai fighter

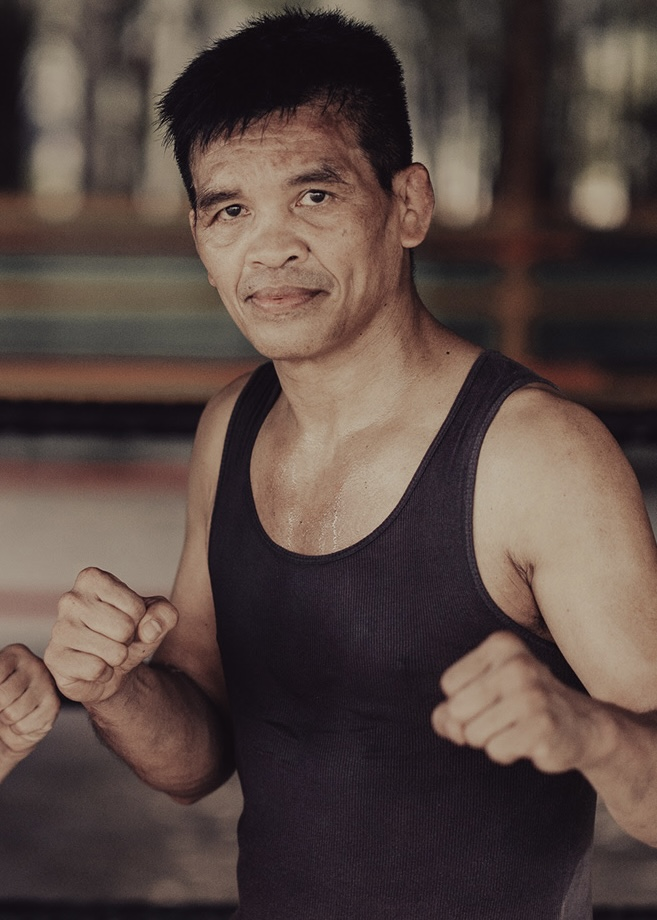
- Panomtuanlek in 2022
- Born: Anusak Thitkrathoak; November 1, 1966 (age 59); Mueang Maha Sarakham, Maha Sarakham, Thailand
- Native name: อนุศักดิ์ ทิศกระโทก
- Other names: Anusak Sor Pohpitak (-1982); Panomtuanlek Sor.Dejdamrongwut (พนมทวนเล็ก ส.เดชดำรงค์วุฒิ) (1990-1991); Panomtuanlek Wor.Sangprapai (พนมทวนเล็ก ว.สังข์ประไพ) (1994)
- Nickname: The Raging Storm of the Sea, Master of the Knee (ขุนเข่าทะเลคลั่ง); Mr. Cruel Knee (ไอ้หำเข่าโหด)
- Height: 170 cm (5 ft 7 in)
- Division: Flyweight; Super Flyweight; Bantamweight; Super Bantamweight; Featherweight
- Style: Muay Thai (Muay Khao)
- Stance: Orthodox
- Team: Hapalang (Sor.Sirinan)

Anusak Thitkrathoak (Thai: อนุศักดิ์ ทิศกระโทก; born November 1, 1966), known professionally as Panomtuanlek Hapalang (Thai: พนมทวนเล็ก ห้าพลัง), is a Thai former professional Muay Thai fighter. He is a former Lumpinee Stadium champion and two-time Rajadamnern Stadium champion across three divisions, as well as the 1986 Sports Writers Association of Thailand Fighter of the Year.

== Biography and career ==
Panomtuanlek started Muay Thai training with his Uncle and fought in his hometown with the ring name “Anusak Sor Pohpitak”. He caught the attention of Leng Sarakham, a celebrity in the Muay Thai community of Isan, he was transferred to his supervision and also spent time at the Saknipon gym. Leng Sarakham had him fight in many bouts with hundreds of thousand baht on the line. In 1982, Anusak transferred to Hapalang gym in Bangkok and that was when he became Phanomtuanlek Hapalang as widely known by the fans.

Panomtuanlek was a dominant clinch and knee fighter of the 80s, he trained alongside other legendary knee fighters Dieselnoi Chor Thanasukarn and Chamuekpet Hapalang. Nicknamed the "Madly Sea Storm Knee Striker", he was especially known for his relentless pressure, clinch, and knees.

After his fighting career Panomtuanlek became a trainer in Thailand and Japan.

== Titles & honours ==
- Rajadamnern Stadium
  - 1986 Rajadamnern Stadium Super Flyweight (115 lbs) Champion
  - 1986 Rajadamnern Stadium Bantamweight (118 lbs) Champion
- Lumpinee Stadium
  - 1987 Lumpinee Stadium Super Bantamweight (122 lbs) Champion
    - Two successful title defenses

Awards

- 1986 Sports Writers Association of Thailand Fighter of the Year

== Fight record ==
Muay Thai Record (Incomplete)
Date	Result	Opponent	Event	Location	Method	Round	Time
2000-05-26	Loss	(Japan) Takashi Ito	MAJKF "COMBAT-2000"	Tokyo, Japan	TKO	1	0:28
2000-05-07	Win	(Japan) Takaya Sato	NJKF Millennium Wars 4	Tokyo, Japan	Decision (Unanimous)	5	3:00
1994-03-04	Loss	(Thailand) Rainbow Sor.Prantalay	Lumpinee Stadium	Bangkok, Thailand	TKO (Punches)	5	
1994-02-11	Win	(Thailand) Boonlertlek Sor.Nantana	Lumpinee Stadium	Bangkok, Thailand	Decision	5	3:00
1991-11-13	Loss	(Thailand) Khunpon Kaewsamrit	Rajadamnern Stadium	Bangkok, Thailand	KO (Punches)	2	
1991-09-23	Loss	(Thailand) Jack Kiatniwat	Rajadamnern Stadium	Bangkok, Thailand	Decision	5	3:00
1991-08-15	Win	(Thailand) Dechsawin Sor.Vorapin	Rajadamnern Stadium	Bangkok, Thailand	TKO (Knees)		
1991-06-26	Loss	(Thailand) Taweechai Wor.Preecha	Rajadamnern Stadium	Bangkok, Thailand	KO	2	
1991-05-13	Loss	(Thailand) Jongrak Lukprabaht	Rajadamnern Stadium	Bangkok, Thailand	TKO (Doctor Stoppage)	2	
1991-03-20	Loss	(Thailand) Jongrak Lukprabaht	Rajadamnern Stadium	Bangkok, Thailand	Decision	5	3:00
1991-01-30	Win	(Thailand) Jongrak Lukprabaht	Rajadamnern Stadium	Bangkok, Thailand	Decision	5	3:00
1990-11-29	Loss	(Thailand) Prasongphet Sor.Tamarangsri	Rajadamnern Stadium	Bangkok, Thailand	KO	2	
1990-10-31	Win	(Thailand) Khunpon Chor.Rochanachai	Rajadamnern Stadium	Bangkok, Thailand	Decision	5	3:00
1989-12-31	Loss	(Thailand) Taweechai Wor.Preecha		Bangkok, Thailand	Decision	5	3:00
1989-11-27	Loss	(Thailand) Phajonchit Lukmatuli		Bangkok, Thailand	Decision	5	3:00
1989-01-15	Loss	(Thailand) Kongnapa Watcharawit	Crocodile Farm	Samut Prakan, Thailand	KO (Punches)	2	
For the vacant Rajadamnern Stadium Featherweight (126 lbs) title.
1988-12-31	Win	(Thailand) Ruengnoi Chomphuthong		Kalasin province, Thailand	KO	2	
1988-11-25	Loss	(Thailand) Wangchannoi Sor.Palangchai	Lumpinee Stadium	Bangkok, Thailand	TKO (Doctor Stoppage)	2	
Loses Lumpinee Stadium Super Bantamweight (122 lbs) title.
1988-08-30	Loss	(Thailand) Jaroenthong Kiatbanchong	Lumpinee Stadium	Bangkok, Thailand	Decision	5	3:00
1988-06-24	Win	(Thailand) Kongtoranee Payakaroon	Lumpinee Stadium	Bangkok, Thailand	Decision	5	3:00
1988-05-03	Win	(Thailand) Namphon Nongkeepahuyuth	Lumpinee Stadium	Bangkok, Thailand	TKO (Knees)	3	
Defends Lumpinee Stadium Super Bantamweight (122 lbs) title.
1988-01-26	Loss	(Thailand) Samart Payakaroon	Lumpinee Stadium	Bangkok, Thailand	KO (Punches)	1	
1987-11-27	Win	(Thailand) Manasak Sor Ploenchit	Lumpinee Stadium	Bangkok, Thailand	Decision	5	3:00
Defends Lumpinee Stadium Super Bantamweight (122 lbs) title.
1987-10-27	Win	(Thailand) Petchdam Lukborai	Lumpinee Stadium	Bangkok, Thailand	Decision	5	3:00
Wins the vacant Lumpinee Stadium Super Bantamweight (122 lbs) title.
1987-07-31	Loss	(Thailand) Manasak Sor.Ploenchit		Bangkok, Thailand	KO	1	
1987-05-19	Win	(Thailand) Samransak Muangsurin	Lumpinee Stadium	Bangkok, Thailand	Decision	5	3:00
1987-03-06	Win	(Thailand) Samransak Muangsurin	Lumpinee Stadium	Bangkok, Thailand	Decision	5	3:00
1986-10-29	Win	(Thailand) Jampatong Na Nontachai	Rajadamnern Stadium	Bangkok, Thailand	Decision	5	3:00
1986-09-25	Win	(Thailand) Jampatong Na Nontachai	Rajadamnern Stadium	Bangkok, Thailand	Decision	5	3:00
Wins the Rajadamnern Stadium Bantamweight (118 lbs) title.
1986-08-11	Win	(Thailand) Phisuj Sor.Jitpattana	Rajadamnern Stadium	Bangkok, Thailand	Decision	5	3:00
Wins Rajadamnern Stadium Super Flyweight (115 lbs) title.
1986-06-12	Win	(Thailand) Boonam Sor.Jarunee	Rajadamnern Stadium	Bangkok, Thailand	KO	3	
1986-02-13	Draw	(Thailand) Noppachai Lukmingkway	Rajadamnern Stadium	Bangkok, Thailand	Decision	5	3:00
For the Rajadamnern Stadium Flyweight (112 lbs) title.
1985-12-17	Win	(Thailand) Odnoi Lukprabat	Lumpinee Stadium	Bangkok, Thailand	Decision	5	3:00
1985-10-29	Win	(Thailand) Klaypatapi Majestic	Lumpinee Stadium	Bangkok, Thailand	Decision	5	3:00
1985-06-04	Win	(Thailand) Panthong Phitaktangluang	Lumpinee Stadium	Bangkok, Thailand	Ref.stop (Panthong dismissed)	4	
1985-04-23	Win	(Thailand) Fahlan Lukprabat	Lumpinee Stadium	Bangkok, Thailand	Decision	5	3:00
1985-03-01	Win	(Thailand) Grandprixnoi Muangchaiyaphum	Lumpinee Stadium	Bangkok, Thailand	Decision	5	3:00
1985-01-25	Win	(Thailand) Grandprixnoi Muangchaiyaphum	Lumpinee Stadium	Bangkok, Thailand	Decision	5	3:00
1985-01-05	Win	(Thailand) Sangchai Singsaphanku	Lumpinee Stadium	Bangkok, Thailand	Decision	5	3:00
1984-11-30	Win	(Thailand) Kohpho Sitchanyuth	Lumpinee Stadium	Bangkok, Thailand	Decision	5	3:00
1984-08-31	Loss	(Thailand) Odnoi Lukprabat	Lumpinee Stadium	Bangkok, Thailand	KO	3	
1984-06-29	Loss	(Thailand) Warunee Sor.Ploenchit	Lumpinee Stadium	Bangkok, Thailand	KO	2	
1984-03-30	Loss	(Thailand) Dennuah Pitsanurachan	Lumpinee Stadium	Bangkok, Thailand	Decision	5	3:00
1984-01-24	Loss	(Thailand) Sittichok Monsongkhram	Lumpinee Stadium	Bangkok, Thailand	Decision	5	3:00
1983-11-29	Loss	(Thailand) Sitthichai Monsongkhram	Lumpinee Stadium	Bangkok, Thailand	Decision	5	3:00
1983-10-23	Win	(Thailand) Odnoi Lukprabat	Lumpinee Stadium	Bangkok, Thailand	TKO (Knees)	4	
1983-09-10	Loss	(Thailand) Sitthichai Monsongkhram	Lumpinee Stadium	Bangkok, Thailand	Decision	5	3:00
1983-07-12	Win	(Thailand) Odnoi Lukprabat	Lumpinee Stadium	Bangkok, Thailand	TKO (Knees)	3	
Wins 2 million baht side-bet.
1983-04-07	Win	(Thailand) Banchanoi WichannoiStore	Rajadamnern Stadium	Bangkok, Thailand	KO	4	
1983-03-07	Loss	(Thailand) Lukkrok Kiaturai	Rajadamnern Stadium	Bangkok, Thailand	Decision	5	3:00
1982-12-15	Win	(Thailand) Petchnoi Singhmanasak	Rajadamnern Stadium	Bangkok, Thailand	Decision	5	3:00
1982-11-17	Loss	(Thailand) Petchnoi Singhmanasak	Rajadamnern Stadium	Bangkok, Thailand	Decision	5	3:00
1982-10-	Win	(Thailand) Kulabdam Khwanjai MC		Kalasin province, Thailand	KO	4	
1982-09-26	Loss	(Thailand) Sathanlek Lukmingkwan	Rajadamnern Stadium	Bangkok, Thailand	Decision	5	3:00
1982-08-23	Win	(Thailand) Chanchai Sor.Tamarangsri	Rajadamnern Stadium	Bangkok, Thailand	Decision	5	3:00
1982-08-01	Win	(Thailand) Starboy Lukbangbon	Rajadamnern Stadium	Thailand	Decision	5	3:00
Legend: Win Loss Draw/No contest Notes
