= Tappaya Sit-Or =

Muay Thai fighter

Tappaya
- Born: 1 February 1976 (age 50); Chonburi Province, Thailand
- Other names: Tappaya Crosspointgym (タッパヤー・クロスポイントジム)
- Nationality: Thai
- Height: 171 cm (5 ft 7 in)
- Weight: 61 kg (134 lb; 9.6 st)
- Stance: Orthodox
- Fighting out of: Bangkok, Thailand
- Team: Sit Or

Other information
- Occupation: Muay Thai trainer
- Notable relatives: Yokthai Sit-Or (brother); Rambaa Somdet (nephew)

Tappaya Sit Or (Thai: ทัพยา ศิษย์อ อ; born February 1, 1976) or Mit Klinmee, is a former Rajadamnern and WMC champion with past rankings at Lumpini and Channel 7. Tappaya is currently retired from competition and runs the eponymous Sor Klinmee Gym in Pattaya, Thailand.

== Biography and career ==
=== Early life ===
Tappaya is the youngest of 11 children and began training and fighting regularly at the age of 6 along with his brother, Yokthai Sit-Or, and nephew, Rambaa Somdet. The three would train before and after school. In the evenings, they would compete in a local bar for tips. Tappaya was fighting in Bangkok by age 12. The three moved from Petrungruang gym in Pattaya to join the original Sit Or camp in Pattaya at its founding and were the first name fighters produced by the gym. Sit Or has since moved to Bangkok and been home to such fighters as Nong-O Sit-Or and Petchmankong Petfergus.

=== Championship era ===
In 1997, he challenged and defeated Ankandet BaoBaoin for the 61.5 kg Rajadamnern belt. The bout was televised on Channel 5 in Thailand. Tappaya would hold the Rajadamnern belt for three consecutive years. Also in 1997, on August 10, he would win the WMC belt from Panmongkon Carryboy at 61.5 kg. He was ranked first at Lumpini Stadium, though he did not win the belt there. Tappaya became a high-profile fighter on Channel 7 during this time.

He ended his career with a record of 200 wins, 36 losses, and five draws, with a Rajadamnern and WMC belt at 61.5 kg, and a no.1 ranking at Lumpini.

=== Coaching ===
Toward the end of his fight career, he traveled to China, Japan, and the United Kingdom to teach and compete in Muay Thai. When he lived in Japan he competed in both kickboxing and MMA. He defeated Hayato in kickboxing rules fight as a representant of the Crosspoint Gym.

When he retired in 2001, Tappaya had plans to open his own gym, which he did in 2009. He is the owner and acting head trainer of Sor Klinmee Gym in Pattaya on Neung Phap Wan road.

Currently, Tappaya has two students regularly competing at the major stadiums in Bangkok. Robert Sor Klinmee is a southpaw fighter competing at 46 kg at Rajadamnern Stadium.
Sangpet Sor Klinmee is an orthodox fighter competing at 45.5 kg at Rajadamnern and Lumpini. Sinsamut Klinmee and his famous brother Sudsakorn Sor Klinmee train at Sor Klinmee Gym as does Yokthai's son, Thepprasit champion Fasai Sor Klinmee.

There are a number of younger boxers based out of the gym.

== Titles & honours ==
- Rajadamnern Stadium
  - 1996 Rajadamnern Stadium Lightweight (135 lbs) Champion
- World Muay Thai Council
  - 1997 WMC World Lightweight Champion

== Mixed martial arts record ==
Professional record breakdown
1 match	0 wins	1 loss
By submission	0	1

Res.	Record	Opponent	Method	Event	Date	Round	Time	Location	Notes
Loss	0–1	Taisho	Submission (armbar)	Deep 7 Impact	December 8, 2002	1	4:36	Tokyo, Japan	

== Muay Thai record ==
Muay Thai Record (Incomplete)
200 Wins, 36 Losses, 5 Draws
Date	Result	Opponent	Event	Location	Method	Round	Time
2003-02-16	Win	(Japan) HAYATO	IKUSA "YOUNG GUNNERS"	Tokyo, Japan	Decision (Majority)	3	3:00
2000-06-11	Win	(Thailand) Theparit Por.Tawatchai	Channel 7 Stadium	Bangkok, Thailand	Decision	5	3:00
2000-01-02	Win	(Thailand) Theparit Por.Tawatchai	Channel 7 Stadium	Bangkok, Thailand	Decision	5	3:00
1999-09-05	Loss	(Thailand) Theparit Por.Tawatchai	Channel 7 Stadium	Bangkok, Thailand	Decision	5	3:00
1999-01-10	Loss	(Thailand) Theparit Por.Tawatchai	Channel 7 Stadium	Bangkok, Thailand	Decision	5	3:00
1999-07-25	Win	(Thailand) Panmongkol Carryboy	Channel 7 Stadium	Bangkok, Thailand	Decision	5	3:00
1998-11-01	Win	(Thailand) Saifah Sor.Phannuch	Channel 7 Stadium	Bangkok, Thailand	Decision	5	3:00
1997-12-06	Loss	(Thailand) Rungthong RatchadaMusicCafe	Omnoi Stadium	Samut Sakhon, Thailand	Decision	5	3:00
1997-09-17	Loss	(Thailand) Ankarndej Por.Paoin	Rajadamnern Stadium	Bangkok, Thailand	Decision	5	3:00
1997-08-10	Win	(Thailand) Panmongkol Carryboy	Channel 7 Stadium	Bangkok, Thailand	Decision	5	3:00
Wins the WMC World 135 lbs title.
1997-02-18	Loss	(Thailand) Robert Kaennorasing	Channel 7 Stadium	Bangkok, Thailand	Decision	5	3:00
1996-10-27	Loss	(Thailand) Robert Kaennorasing	Channel 7 Stadium	Bangkok, Thailand	Decision	5	3:00
1996-06-22	Win	(Thailand) Ankarndej Por.Paoin	Omnoi Stadium	Samut Sakhon, Thailand	Decision	5	3:00
1996-	Win	(Thailand) Ankarndej Por.Paoin	Rajadamnern Stadium	Bangkok, Thailand	Decision	5	3:00
Wins the Rajadamnern Stadium 135 lbs title.
1996-	Win	(Thailand) Chanchai Sor Tamarangsri		Songkhla, Thailand	Decision	5	3:00
1996-02-18		(Thailand) Kongsuk Kiattiprasanchai		Bangkok, Thailand	Decision	5	3:00
1996-01-14	Win	(Thailand) Anupap Sit Kru Od		Bangkok, Thailand	Decision	5	3:00
1995-	Win	(Thailand) Charoenlap Kiatprasanchai		Bangkok, Thailand	Decision	5	3:00
1995-	Win	(Thailand) Rungnimit Por.Surasak		Bangkok, Thailand	Decision	5	3:00
1995-05-14	Loss	(Thailand) Chanchai Sor Tamarangsri	Channel 7 Stadium	Bangkok, Thailand	Decision	5	3:00
1995-02-07	Win	(Thailand) Dechpichit Kiattisak Sor.Por	Lumpinee Stadium	Bangkok, Thailand	Decision	5	3:00
1995-01-01	Win	(Thailand) BM Sasipraphayam	Channel 7 Stadium	Bangkok, Thailand	TKO (Doctor stoppage)	2	
1994-11-04	Loss	(Thailand) Mantai Sakmethee	Lumpinee Stadium	Bangkok, Thailand	Decision	5	3:00
1993-04-04	Win	(Thailand) Saifah Sor.Phannuch	Channel 7 Stadium	Bangkok, Thailand	Decision	5	3:00
Legend: Win Loss Draw/No contest Notes
