= Yoknoi Fairtex =

Thai former professional Muay Thai fighter

- Born: Mokhon Ruekha; December 13, 1962; Kaset Sombun, Chaiyaphum, Thailand
- Died: November 14, 2023 (aged 60)
- Native name: มอคล ฤาขา
- Other names: Yoknoi Kiatsompop (หยกน้อย เกียรติสมภพ)
- Nickname: Fatal Left (ซ้ายมรณะ)
- Division: Light Flyweight; Flyweight; Super Flyweight; Bantamweight; Super Bantamweight; Featherweight
- Style: Muay Thai (Muay Mat)
- Stance: Southpaw
- Team: Fairtex
- Trainer: Apidej Sit-Hirun

Mokhon Ruekha (Thai: มอคล ฤาขา; December 13, 1962 – November 14, 2023), known professionally as Yoknoi Fairtex (Thai: หยกน้อย แฟร์เท็กซ์), was a Thai professional Muay Thai fighter. He was a two-time Lumpinee Stadium Featherweight Champion who fought during the 1980s.

== Biography and career ==
Yoknoi started training in Muay Thai with his older brother, Katanyu Kiatsompop, following him to Bangkok to join the Kiatsompop camp. As he weighed only 38 kg he had to fight at Rangsit Stadium three times, winning all three before making his Bangkok debut in 1979 at the Lumpinee Stadium under the name Yoknoi Kiatsompop. A year later, he joined the Fairtex Gym also in Bangkok.

Training alongside fighters such as Jongsanan Fairtex, Yoknoi became a popular fighter under the Onesongchai promotion in the early 1980s. He captured the Lumpinee Stadium Featherweight title in 1985 and defended it once before losing it. He regained the title in 1986.

He fought during the Golden Era of Muay Thai against many notable fighters including Samransak Muangsurin, Chanchai Sor.Tamarangsri, Jomwo Chernyim, Sanit Wichitkriengkrai, Bandon Sitbangprachan, Saengsakda Kittikasem, Palannoi Kiatanan, and Sornsilp Sitnoenpayom.

After retiring in 1990, Yoknoi became a trainer at the Fairtex Gym and opened a store next to the gym.

== Titles and honours ==
- Lumpinee Stadium
  - 1985 Lumpinee Stadium Featherweight (126 lbs) Champion
    - One successful title defense
  - 1986 Lumpinee Stadium Featherweight (126 lbs) Champion
    - One successful title defense

== Fight record ==
Muay Thai Record (Incomplete)
Date	Result	Opponent	Event	Location	Method	Round	Time
1990-	NC	(Thailand) Saknarit Kiatprawit		Bangkok, Thailand	Yoknoi dismissed	5	
1989-10-30	Loss	(Thailand) Phai-Ngern Sor.SiharatNakhon	Rajadamnern Stadium	Bangkok, Thailand	Decision	5	3:00
1989-09-14	Win	(Thailand) Den Sahakarn Osot	Yodnuamthong, Rajadamnern Stadium	Bangkok, Thailand	KO (High kick)	4	
1989-03-02	Loss	(Thailand) Den Sahakarn Osot	Yodnuamthong, Rajadamnern Stadium	Bangkok, Thailand	KO	1	
1988-08-05	Loss	(Thailand) Sanit Wichitkriengkrai	Fairtex, Lumpinee Stadium	Bangkok, Thailand	Decision	5	3:00
1988-04-06	Loss	(Thailand) Tuanthong Lukdecha	Chalermchai, Rajadamnern Stadium	Bangkok, Thailand	TKO (High kick)	1	
1988-03-09	Win	(Thailand) Saengsakda Kittikasem	Rajadamnern Stadium	Bangkok, Thailand	KO (punches)	2	
1987-11-08	Loss	(Thailand) Tuantong Lukdecha	Samart Payakaroon vs Hogan Noguchi	Chachoengsao, Thailand	KO	2	
1987-07-31	Loss	(Thailand) Chanchai Sor.Tamarangsri	100th Anniversary of Chulalongkorn Royal Military Academy, Lumpinee Stadium	Bangkok, Thailand	Decision	5	3:00
Loses the Lumpinee Stadium Featherweight (126 lbs) title.
1987-05-19	Loss	(Thailand) Jomwo Chernyim	Onesongchai, Lumpinee Stadium	Bangkok, Thailand	KO (high kick)	4	
1987-03-21	Win	(Thailand) Sanit Wichitkriengkrai	Onesongchai, Lumpinee Stadium	Bangkok, Thailand	Decision	5	3:00
1987-02-06	Loss	(Thailand) Samransak Muangsurin	Onesongchai, Lumpinee Stadium	Bangkok, Thailand	KO (punches)	4	
1986-12-19	Win	(Thailand) Sanit Wichitkriengkrai	Kongtoranee Payakaroon vs Gilberto Roman, Huamark Stadium	Bangkok, Thailand	Decision	5	3:00
Defends the Lumpinee Stadium Featherweight (126 lbs) title.
1986-11-25	Win	(Thailand) Palannoi Kiatanan	Onesongchai, Lumpinee Stadium	Bangkok, Thailand	Decision (Unanimous)	5	3:00
Wins the Lumpinee Stadium Featherweight (126 lbs) title.
1986-08-22	Loss	(Thailand) Sanit Wichitkriengkrai	Onesongchai, Lumpinee Stadium	Bangkok, Thailand	Decision	5	3:00
1986-07-18	Win	(Thailand) Saengsakda Kittikasem	Lumpinee Stadium	Bangkok, Thailand	Decision	5	3:00
1986-05-30	Win	(Thailand) Chanchai Sor.Tamarangsri	Onesongchai, Lumpinee Stadium	Bangkok, Thailand	KO (punches)	4	
1986-04-03	Win	(Thailand) Palannoi Kiatanan	Wanchai, Lumpinee Stadium	Bangkok, Thailand	KO (punches)	3	
1985-12-06	Loss	(Thailand) Petchdam Lukborai	Onesongchai, Lumpinee Stadium Birthday Show	Bangkok, Thailand	KO (Punches)	2	
1985-10-11	Loss	(Thailand) Bandon Sitbangprachan	Lumpinee Stadium	Bangkok, Thailand	Decision	5	3:00
Loses the Lumpinee Stadium Featherweight (126 lbs) title.
1985-09-03	Draw	(Thailand) Bandon Sitbangprachan	Lumpinee Stadium	Bangkok, Thailand	Decision	5	3:00
Defends the Lumpinee Stadium Featherweight (126 lbs) title.
1985-06-22	Win	(Thailand) Sornsilp Sitnoenpayom	WBC - Sot Chitalada vs Gabriel Bernal, Nimibutr Stadium	Bangkok, Thailand	Decision	5	3:00
Wins the Lumpinee Stadium Featherweight (126 lbs) title.
1985-04-20	Loss	(Thailand) Samransak Muangsurin	Onesongchai, Lumpinee Stadium	Bangkok, Thailand	Decision	5	3:00
1985-03-29	Win	(Thailand) Sornsilp Sitnoenpayom	Lumpinee Stadium	Bangkok, Thailand	Decision	5	3:00
1985-02-08	Win	(Thailand) Palannoi Kiatanan	Onesongchai, Lumpinee Stadium	Bangkok, Thailand	KO	4	
1984-11-23	Win	(Thailand) Kongdej Sitchow	Lumpinee Stadium	Bangkok, Thailand	KO	3	
1984-11-01	Win	(Thailand) Fa-uthai Phitsanurachan	Lumpinee Stadium	Bangkok, Thailand	Decision	5	3:00
1984-09-18	Draw	(Thailand) Saifon Lukkaboo	Lumpinee Stadium	Bangkok, Thailand	Decision	5	3:00
1984-08-07	Loss	(Thailand) Phiset Thanakorn	Lumpinee Stadium	Bangkok, Thailand	Decision	5	3:00
1984-07-06	Loss	(Thailand) Saifon Lukkaboo	Lumpinee Stadium	Bangkok, Thailand	Decision	5	3:00
1984-05-04	Win	(Thailand) Saifon Lukkaboo	Lumpinee Stadium	Bangkok, Thailand	Decision	5	3:00
1984-03-13	Loss	(Thailand) Narak Sitkuanyim	Lumpinee Stadium	Bangkok, Thailand	Decision	5	3:00
1984-02-21	Loss	(Thailand) Phiset Thanakorn	Lumpinee Stadium	Bangkok, Thailand	Decision	5	3:00
1984-01-13	NC	(Thailand) Chamnanseuk Phitsanurachan	Lumpinee Stadium	Bangkok, Thailand	Chamnanseuk dismissed	4	
1983-10-25	Loss	(Thailand) Ruengchai Thairungruang	Fairtex, Lumpinee Stadium	Bangkok, Thailand	Decision	5	3:00
1983-09-23	Win	(Thailand) Fahlikit Sitmanathep	Fairtex, Lumpinee Stadium	Bangkok, Thailand	Decision	5	3:00
1983-	Win	(Thailand) Chokdee Kiatpayathai	Lumpinee Stadium	Bangkok, Thailand	Decision	5	3:00
1983-	Win	(Thailand) Kanay Wongprasert	Lumpinee Stadium	Bangkok, Thailand	Decision	5	3:00
1983-	Win	(Thailand) Rakkiat Sor.Sawat	Lumpinee Stadium	Bangkok, Thailand	Decision	5	3:00
1983-04-12	Loss	(Thailand) Yodyon Weerapol	Fairtex, Lumpinee Stadium	Bangkok, Thailand	Decision	5	3:00
1983-	Loss	(Thailand) Yodyon Weerapol		Bangkok, Thailand	Decision	5	3:00
1983-	NC	(Thailand) Pichit Sakpreecha		Bangkok, Thailand	Decision	5	3:00
1983-	Win	(Thailand) Prabipop Lukklongtan		Bangkok, Thailand	Decision	5	3:00
1982-	Loss	(Thailand) Daris Sor.Thanikul		Bangkok, Thailand	Decision	5	3:00
1982-	Loss	(Thailand) Bin Lukprabat		Bangkok, Thailand	Decision	5	3:00
1982-	Win	(Thailand) Raerit Thamachat		Bangkok, Thailand	Decision	5	3:00
1982-	Win	(Thailand) Kanmoed Petmuangtai		Bangkok, Thailand	KO	5	
1982-08-10	Loss	(Thailand) Chaowalit Sitphraphrom	Fairtex, Lumpinee Stadium	Bangkok, Thailand	Decision	5	3:00
1982-	Loss	(Thailand) Chakay Prawi	Lumpinee Stadium	Bangkok, Thailand	Decision	5	3:00
1982-	Win	(Thailand) Khanongsak Kiattipreeda	Lumpinee Stadium	Bangkok, Thailand	KO	2	
1982-03-30	Loss	(Thailand) Ruengnarong Thairungruang	Lumpinee Stadium	Bangkok, Thailand	Decision	5	3:00
1982-	Win	(Thailand) Chingchai Sor.Khunsri	Rajadamnern Stadium	Bangkok, Thailand	Decision	5	3:00
1982-02-12	Loss	(Thailand) Kwanla Sitsunthorn		Bangkok, Thailand	Decision	5	3:00
1982-01-05	Draw	(Thailand) Kwanla Sitsunthorn	Fairtex, Lumpinee Stadium	Bangkok, Thailand	Decision	5	3:00
1981-	Win	(Thailand) Aroi Siharadetcho		Bangkok, Thailand	Decision	5	3:00
1981-11-10	Win	(Thailand) Narak Sitkuanyim	Kiatsompop, Lumpinee Stadium	Bangkok, Thailand	Decision	5	3:00
1981-	Win	(Thailand) Khajornkai Shaysilp		Bangkok, Thailand	Decision	5	3:00
1981-08-11	Win	(Thailand) Chula Sitchansak	Lumpinee Stadium	Bangkok, Thailand	Decision	5	3:00
1981-	Loss	(Thailand) Boonam Sor.Jarunee		Bangkok, Thailand	Decision	5	3:00
1981-	Win	(Thailand) Saganthap Singkhiri		Bangkok, Thailand	Decision	5	3:00
1981-	Loss	(Thailand) Daowgern Sitmuangthong		Bangkok, Thailand	Decision	5	3:00
1981-	Win	(Thailand) Sakawanoi Kiattilsanang		Bangkok, Thailand	Decision	5	3:00
1980-12-14	Win	(Thailand) Toha Sor.Sukanyanoi	Rajadamnern Stadium	Bangkok, Thailand	Decision	5	3:00
1980-05-13	Loss	(Thailand) Singtongnoi Prasopchai	Lumpinee Stadium	Bangkok, Thailand	Decision	5	3:00
1980-02-18	Loss	(Thailand) Dansai Sor.Kraiwan	Lumpinee Stadium	Bangkok, Thailand	Decision	5	3:00
1980-01-25	Loss	(Thailand) Yodthai Sittharawat	Lumpinee Stadium	Bangkok, Thailand	Decision	5	3:00
1979-12-14	Win	(Thailand) Ainum Senapitak	Lumpinee Stadium	Bangkok, Thailand	Decision	5	3:00
1979-11-17	Win	(Thailand) Hanumannoi Sit Praluang	Lumpinee Stadium	Bangkok, Thailand	Decision	5	3:00
1979-10-05	Win	(Thailand) Lukthai Or.Sayanoi	Lumpinee Stadium	Bangkok, Thailand	KO	4	
Legend: Win Loss Draw/No contest Notes
