= Samransak Muangsurin =

Thai professional Muay Thai fighter and amateur boxer

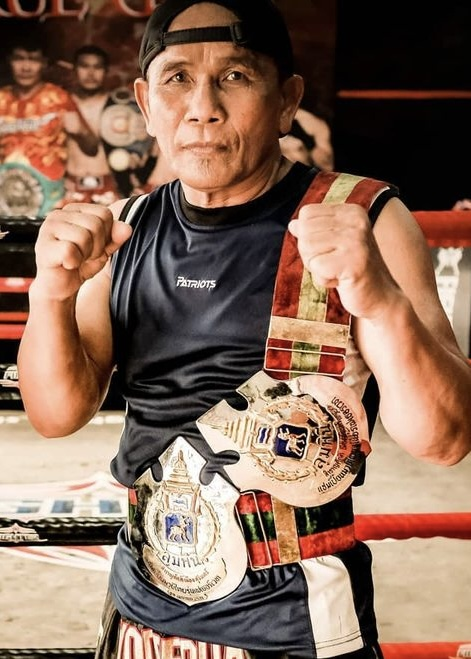
- Samransak in 2020
- Born: Ran Kijram; 18 June 1959 (age 67); Buriram, Thailand
- Native name: สำราญศักดิ์ เมืองสุรินทร์
- Other names: The Iron Fist (ไอ้หมัดสากเหล็ก)
- Height: 168 cm (5 ft 6 in)
- Division: Light Flyweight; Super Flyweight; Bantamweight; Super Bantamweight; Featherweight
- Style: Muay Thai (Muay Mat)
- Stance: Orthodox
- Team: Muangsurin Gym
- Years active: c. 1973–1991

Other information
- Occupation: Muay Thai fighter (retired); Muay Thai trainer

Ran Kijram (Thai: ราญ กิจรัมย์; born June 18, 1959), known professionally as Samransak Muangsurin (Thai: สำราญศักดิ์ เมืองสุรินทร์), is a Thai former professional Muay Thai fighter and amateur boxer. He is a former two-division Lumpinee Stadium champion who was famous in the 1980s and 1990s. Nicknamed "The Iron Fist, he is often regarded as one of the most fearsome punchers in the history of Muay Thai.

== Muay Thai career ==
After beating Smaranthong Kiatbanchong by KO in Lumpinee Stadium on 7 April 1992, Samransak announced his retirement from competition. He since has been working as a Muay Thai trainer in various camps around Thailand and Japan.

== Professional boxing career ==
Samransak had only one boxing fight in 1985 but in 1975 his promoter Thiamboon Inthrabut, who was also the promoter and mentor of Saensak Muangsurin, a boxer from the same camp who became world champion after just three fights, planned for him to follow a similar path. Thiamboon intended for him to fight for the world championship in his very first match. However, that fight never happened, and he did not box professionally again for many years as Thiamboon retired from boxing to run for Governor of Bangkok.

== Titles and accomplishments ==
=== Muay Thai ===
- Lumpinee Stadium
  - 1986 Lumpinee Stadium Super Bantamweight (122 lbs) Champion
  - 1988 Lumpinee Stadium Featherweight (126 lbs) Champion
- World Free-style Martial Arts
  - 1982 WFMA Super Bantamweight (122 lbs) Champion

Awards

- 1986 Sports Writers Association of Thailand Fight of the Year (vs Saengsakda Kittikasem)

=== Amateur Boxing ===
- 1982 Thailand Championship Bantamweight (gold)
- 1983 Thailand Championship Featherweight (silver)
- 1984 Thailand Championship Featherweight (gold)

== Professional Boxing record ==
1 fight	0 wins	1 loss
By knockout	0	1
By decision	0	0

No.	Result	Record	Opponent	Type	Round	Date	Location	Notes
1	Win	1–0	(Indonesia) Sambung	KO	2	1985-10-	Lumpinee Stadium, Bangkok, Thailand	

== Muay Thai record ==
Muay Thai Record
around 90 Wins (50 KO's), 40 Losses, 5 Draws
Date	Result	Opponent	Event	Location	Method	Round	Time
1999-11-26	Draw	(Japan) Hayato Nakabayashi	MAJKF	Tokyo, Japan	Decision	5	3:00
1992-04-07	Win	(Thailand) Samranthong Kiatbanchong	Lumpinee Stadium	Bangkok, Thailand	KO	2	
1992-02-08	Loss	(Thailand) Coban Lookchaomaesaitong	Lumpinee Stadium	Bangkok, Thailand	KO	2	
1991-11-30	Win	(Thailand) Sinin Phetwihan	Lumpinee Stadium	Bangkok, Thailand	Decision	5	3:00
1991-11-09	Loss	(Thailand) Boonchai Tor.Thuwanon	Lumpinee Stadium	Bangkok, Thailand	Decision	5	3:00
1991-10-12	Win	(Thailand) Ronphibun Sitchukiat	Lumpinee Stadium	Bangkok, Thailand	Decision	5	3:00
1991-08-24	Win	(Thailand) Sakmongkol Sithchuchok	Lumpinee Stadium	Bangkok, Thailand	KO (Punches)	2	
1991-07-20	Loss	(Thailand) Nuenthong Singkiri	Lumpinee Stadium	Bangkok, Thailand	Decision	5	3:00
1991-05-31	Loss	(Thailand) Coban Lookchaomaesaitong	Lumpinee Stadium	Bangkok, Thailand	TKO (Punches)	3	
1991-04-30	Win	(Thailand) Khamsanya Tor.Sitthichai	Lumpinee Stadium	Bangkok, Thailand	KO (Punches)	3	
1991-04-05	Win	(Thailand) Kaewao Chor.Cheuchart	Lumpinee Stadium	Bangkok, Thailand	KO (Punches)	2	
1991-03-05	Win	(Thailand) Orono Por Muang Ubon	Lumpinee Stadium	Bangkok, Thailand	Decision	5	3:00
1991-02-02	Win	(Thailand) Kaonar Sor.Kettalingchan	Lumpinee Stadium	Bangkok, Thailand	Decision	5	3:00
1991-01-11	Win	(Thailand) Sinin Phetwihan	Lumpinee Stadium	Bangkok, Thailand	Decision	5	3:00
1990-12-11	Loss	(Thailand) Sinin Phetwihan	Lumpinee Stadium	Bangkok, Thailand	Decision	5	3:00
1990-11-09	Loss	(Thailand) Kongtoranee Payakaroon	Lumpinee Stadium	Bangkok, Thailand	Decision	5	3:00
1990-10-12	Draw	(Thailand) Kongtoranee Payakaroon	Lumpinee Stadium	Bangkok, Thailand	Decision	5	3:00
1990-08-31	Win	(Thailand) Yodvittaya Sityodtong	Lumpinee Stadium	Bangkok, Thailand	KO	2	
1990-08-07	Win	(Thailand) Lampetch Sor.Bodin	Lumpinee Stadium	Bangkok, Thailand	KO	1	
1990-06-29	Win	(Thailand) Lampetch Sor.Bodin	Lumpinee Stadium	Bangkok, Thailand	Decision	5	3:00
1990-05-15	Win	(Thailand) Wisanupon Saksamut	Lumpinee Stadium	Bangkok, Thailand	Decision	5	3:00
1990-03-30	Loss	(Thailand) Roj Lukrangsee	Lumpinee Stadium	Bangkok, Thailand	Decision	5	3:00
1990-02-03	Loss	(Thailand) Detsak Sakpradu		Thailand	Decision	5	3:00
1989-10-20	Loss	(Thailand) Panomrunglek Chor.Sawat	Lumpinee Stadium	Bangkok, Thailand	Decision	5	3:00
1989-08-29	Loss	(Thailand) Pon Narupai	Lumpinee Stadium	Bangkok, Thailand	Decision	5	3:00
1989-07-29	Loss	(Thailand) Therdkiat Sitthepitak		Surin, Thailand	Decision	5	3:00
1989-06-24	Win	(Thailand) Therdkiat Sitthepitak	Lumpinee Stadium	Bangkok, Thailand	Decision	5	3:00
1989-05-12	Loss	(Thailand) Cherry Sor Wanich	Lumpinee Stadium	Bangkok, Thailand	Decision	5	3:00
1989-04-07	Draw	(Thailand) Cherry Sor Wanich	Lumpinee Stadium	Bangkok, Thailand	Decision	5	3:00
1989-03-10	Loss	(Thailand) Detduang Por.Pongsawang	Lumpinee Stadium	Bangkok, Thailand	Decision	5	3:00
1989-01-31	Win	(Thailand) Dokmaipa Por Pongsawang	Lumpinee Stadium	Bangkok, Thailand	Decision	5	3:00
1989-01-06	Loss	(Thailand) Wangchannoi Sor Palangchai	Lumpinee Stadium	Bangkok, Thailand	Decision	5	3:00
1988-11-25	Loss	(Thailand) Jaroenthong Kiatbanchong	Lumpinee Stadium	Bangkok, Thailand	Decision	5	3:00
Loses the Lumpinee Stadium Featherweight (126 lbs) title.
1988-10-11	Win	(Thailand) Jaroenthong Kiatbanchong	Lumpinee Stadium	Bangkok, Thailand	Decision	5	3:00
1988-08-30	Win	(Thailand) Poonsawat Wor Singsanae	Rajadamnern Stadium	Bangkok, Thailand	KO (Right cross)	3	
1988-07-18	Win	(Thailand) Poonsawat Wor Singsanae	Rajadamnern Stadium	Bangkok, Thailand	Decision	5	3:00
1988-06-24	Loss	(Thailand) Samart Payakaroon	Lumpinee Stadium	Bangkok, Thailand	Decision	5	3:00
1988-05-26	Loss	(Thailand) Samart Payakaroon	Lumpinee Stadium	Bangkok, Thailand	Decision	5	3:00
1988-04-29	Win	(Thailand) Chanchai Sor Tamarangsri	Lumpinee Stadium	Bangkok, Thailand	Decision	5	3:00
Wins the Lumpinee Stadium Featherweight (126 lbs) title.
1988-04-02	Loss	(Thailand) Petchdam Lukborai	WKA Ikki Kajiwara Memorial Show '88	Tokyo, Japan	Decision	5	3:00
For the Thailand Featherweight (126 lbs) title.
1988-02-02	Win	(Thailand) Tuanthong Lukdeja	Lumpinee Stadium	Bangkok, Thailand	Decision	5	3:00
1987-12-29	Win	(Thailand) Sanit Wichitkriengkrai	Onesongchai, Lumpinee Stadium	Bangkok, Thailand	Decision	5	3:00
1987-12-08	Draw	(Thailand) Sanit Wichitkriengkrai	Lumpinee Stadium	Bangkok, Thailand	Decision	5	3:00
1987-10-27	Loss	(Thailand) Paiboon Fairtex	Lumpinee Stadium	Bangkok, Thailand	Decision	5	3:00
1987-09-22	Loss	(Thailand) Bandon Sitbangprachan	Lumpinee Stadium	Bangkok, Thailand	Decision	5	3:00
1987-07-31	Loss	(Thailand) Chamuekpet Hapalang	Lumpinee Stadium	Bangkok, Thailand	Decision	5	3:00
1987-05-19	Loss	(Thailand) Panomtuanlek Hapalang	Lumpinee Stadium	Bangkok, Thailand	Decision	5	3:00
1987-03-06	Loss	(Thailand) Panomtuanlek Hapalang	Lumpinee Stadium	Bangkok, Thailand	Decision	5	3:00
1987-02-06	Win	(Thailand) Yoknoi Fairtex	Lumpinee Stadium	Bangkok, Thailand	KO (Punches)	4	
1986-12-19	Loss	(Thailand) Saencherng Pinsinchai	Huamark Stadium	Bangkok, Thailand	Decision	5	3:00
Loses the Lumpinee Stadium Super Bantamweight (122 lbs) title.
1986-09-09	Win	(Thailand) Saengsakda Kittikasem	Lumpinee Stadium	Bangkok, Thailand	KO (Right cross)	1	
1986-07-18	Loss	(Thailand) Sanit Wichitkriengkrai	Lumpinee Stadium	Bangkok, Thailand	Decision	5	3:00
1986-06-13	Win	(Thailand) Saengsakda Kittikasem	Lumpinee Stadium	Bangkok, Thailand	KO	5	
Wins the Lumpinee Stadium Super Bantamweight (122 lbs) title.
1986-05-06	Loss	(Thailand) Saengsakda Kittikasem	Lumpinee Stadium	Bangkok, Thailand	KO	2	
1986-03-27	Win	(Thailand) Chanchai Sor Tamarangsri	Lumpinee Stadium	Bangkok, Thailand	Decision	5	3:00
1986-02-25	Win	(Thailand) Wisanupon Saksamut	Lumpinee Stadium	Bangkok, Thailand	KO	2	
1985-12-06	Loss	(Thailand) Sanit Wichitkriengkrai	Lumpinee Stadium	Bangkok, Thailand	Decision	5	3:00
1985-09-03	Loss	(Thailand) Chamuekpet Hapalang	Lumpinee Stadium	Bangkok, Thailand	Decision	5	3:00
1985-07-26	Win	(Thailand) Chanchai Sor Tamarangsri		Bangkok, Thailand	KO	1	
1985-06-18	Loss	(Thailand) Jomwo Chernyim	Lumpinee Stadium	Bangkok, Thailand	Decision	5	3:00
1985-04-30	Win	(Thailand) Yoknoi Fairtex	Lumpinee Stadium	Bangkok, Thailand	Decision	5	3:00
1985-04-02	Win	(Thailand) Maewnoi Sitchang	Lumpinee Stadium	Bangkok, Thailand	KO	3	
1985-03-06	Win	(Thailand) Saencherng Pinsinchai		Bangkok, Thailand	KO	2	
1985-02-08	Win	(Thailand) Nikom Phetpothong	Lumpinee Stadium	Bangkok, Thailand	KO	3	
1984-12-18	Win	(Thailand) Petchdam Lukborai	Lumpinee Stadium	Bangkok, Thailand	Decision	5	3:00
1984-11-09	Win	(Thailand) Sornsilp Sitnoenpayom	Lumpinee Stadium	Bangkok, Thailand	Decision	5	3:00
1984-09-28	Loss	(Thailand) Sornsilp Sitnoenpayom	Lumpinee Stadium	Bangkok, Thailand	Decision	5	3:00
1984-08-31	Win	(Thailand) Pornsaknoi Sitchang	Lumpinee Stadium	Bangkok, Thailand	KO	3	
1984-07-31	Loss	(Thailand) Kongtoranee Payakaroon	Lumpinee Stadium	Bangkok, Thailand	Decision	5	3:00
1984-06-29	Win	(Thailand) Manasak Sor Ploenchit		Bangkok, Thailand	KO	3	
1984-05-08	Win	(Thailand) Singdaeng Kiatadi		Bangkok, Thailand	KO	3	
1984-04-10	Win	(Thailand) Chamuekpet Hapalang	Lumpinee Stadium	Bangkok, Thailand	KO (Punches)	2	
1984-03-09	Win	(Thailand) Arthit Majestic	Lumpinee Stadium	Bangkok, Thailand	Decision	5	3:00
1984-02-24	Win	(United States) Nelson Placentia		Los Angeles, United States	KO		
1984-02-	Win	(United States) Ron Sisner	Lumpinee Stadium	Bangkok, Thailand	KO	2	
1984-01-24	Loss	(Thailand) Petchdam Lukborai	Lumpinee Stadium	Bangkok, Thailand	Decision	5	3:00
1983-12-28	Loss	(Thailand) Phanmongkon Hor.Mahachai	Rajadamnern Stadium	Bangkok, Thailand	Decision	5	3:00
1983-11-15	Loss	(Thailand) Kongtoranee Payakaroon	Lumpinee Stadium	Bangkok, Thailand	Decision	5	3:00
1983-10-04	Win	(Thailand) Sornsilp Sitnoenpayom	Lumpinee Stadium	Bangkok, Thailand	Decision	5	3:00
1983-08-26	NC	(Thailand) Mafuang Weerapol	Lumpinee Stadium	Bangkok, Thailand	referee decision	5	
1983-07-12	Win	(Thailand) Sornsilp Sitnoenpayom	Lumpinee Stadium	Bangkok, Thailand	Decision	5	3:00
1983-05-10	Loss	(Thailand) Chamuekpet Hapalang	Lumpinee Stadium	Bangkok, Thailand	Decision	5	3:00
1983-04-05	Loss	(Thailand) Samart Payakaroon	Lumpinee Stadium	Bangkok, Thailand	Decision	5	3:00
1983-02-04	Win	(Thailand) Bangkhlanoi Sor.Thanikul	Lumpinee Stadium	Bangkok, Thailand	TKO	3	
1982-12-24	Win	(Thailand) Jomwo Sakniran	Rajadamnern Stadium	Bangkok, Thailand	KO (Left hook)	3	
1982-10-15	Loss	(Thailand) Pon Sit Paedang	Lumpinee Stadium	Bangkok, Thailand	Decision	5	3:00
1982-09-28	Win	(Thailand) Bangkhlanoi Sor.Thanikul	Lumpinee Stadium	Bangkok, Thailand	KO	2	
1982-08-30	Loss	(Thailand) Ronachai Sunkilanongkee	Rajadamnern Stadium	Bangkok, Thailand	Decision	5	3:00
1982-08-02	Loss	(Thailand) Jomwo Sakniran	Rajadamnern Stadium	Bangkok, Thailand	Decision	5	3:00
For the Rajadamnern Stadium Bantamweight (122 lbs) title
1982-07-09	Loss	(Thailand) Jakrawan Kiatsakdisaktewan	Lumpinee Stadium	Bangkok, Thailand	Decision	5	3:00
1982-05-27	Loss	(Thailand) Bangkhlanoi Sor.Thanikul	Rajadamnern Stadium	Bangkok, Thailand	Decision	5	3:00
1982-04-28	Win	(Japan) Masayuki Yamamoto	Rajadamnern Stadium - World Free-style Martial Arts	Bangkok, Thailand	KO (Punches)	2	
Wins WFMA World Super Bantamweight (122 lbs) title.
1982-04-26	Win	(United States) Dave Loop	World Free-style Martial Arts	Bangkok, Thailand	KO	2	
1982-03-29	Win	(Thailand) Ronachai Sunkilanongkee	Rajadamnern Stadium	Bangkok, Thailand	Decision	5	3:00
1982-02-26	Win	(Thailand) Mafuang Weerapol	Lumpinee Stadium	Bangkok, Thailand	Decision	5	3:00
1982-01-11	Win	(Thailand) Phanmongkon Hor.Mahachai	Rajadamnern Stadium	Bangkok, Thailand	Decision	5	3:00
1981-11-26	Loss	(Thailand) Samingnoom Sithiboontham	Rajadamnern Stadium	Bangkok, Thailand	Decision	5	3:00
1981-10-13	Draw	(Thailand) Kongtoranee Payakaroon	Rajadamnern Stadium	Bangkok, Thailand	Decision	5	3:00
1981-09-21	Win	(Thailand) Kongtoranee Payakaroon	Rajadamnern Stadium	Bangkok, Thailand	Decision	5	3:00
1981-08-20	Win	(Thailand) Bandit Porntawee	Rajadamnern Stadium	Bangkok, Thailand	KO	2	
1981-07-08	Win	(Thailand) Samingnoom Tawatchai	Rajadamnern Stadium	Bangkok, Thailand	KO	3	
1981-05-27	Win	(Thailand) Apirak Singbobae	Rajadamnern Stadium	Bangkok, Thailand	Decision	5	3:00
1981-02-24	Draw	(Thailand) Charanchai Sitwadtep	Lumpinee Stadium	Bangkok, Thailand	Decision	5	3:00
1981-01-23	Win	(Thailand) Chatchai Pichitsuk	Lumpinee Stadium	Bangkok, Thailand	Decision	5	3:00
1980-11-07	Loss	(Thailand) Lamkong Sitwaiwat	Lumpinee Stadium	Bangkok, Thailand	KO	4	
1980-09-29	Win	(Thailand) Petchmongkol Kiattisingnoi		Bangkok, Thailand	Decision	5	3:00
1980-08-21	Win	(Thailand) Fahkaram Lukprabat		Bangkok, Thailand	Decision	5	3:00
1980-07-24	Win	(Thailand) Musa Luksuan		Bangkok, Thailand	KO	3	
1980-06-19	Loss	(Thailand) Fahkaram Lukprabat		Bangkok, Thailand	KO	3	
1980-04-08	Win	(Thailand) Chatchai Panyawut		Bangkok, Thailand	Referee stoppage	5	
1980-03-28	Loss	(Thailand) Wichalud Jinda		Bangkok, Thailand	Decision	5	3:00
1980-02-21	Loss	(Thailand) Wichalud Jinda		Bangkok, Thailand	Decision	5	3:00
1980-01-29	Win	(Thailand) Jakrawan Kiattisakthewan	Rajadamnern Stadium	Bangkok, Thailand	Decision	5	3:00
1980-01-07	Win	(Thailand) Wittaya Saksandee	Rajadamnern Stadium	Bangkok, Thailand	Decision	5	3:00
1979-12-26	Win	(Thailand) Tree Arun Chatyothin		Bangkok, Thailand	Decision	5	3:00
1979-11-28	Win	(Thailand) Mun Sor Jitpattana	Rajadamnern Stadium	Bangkok, Thailand	Decision	5	3:00
1979-10-24	Win	(Thailand) Suratnoi Kiatsurat		Bangkok, Thailand	Decision	5	3:00
1979-09-26	Draw	(Thailand) Suratnoi Kiatsurat		Bangkok, Thailand	Decision	5	3:00
1979-08-22	Win	(Thailand) Kukkongnoi Chor.Suthichot	Rajadamnern Stadium	Bangkok, Thailand	KO	2	
1979-07-25	Win	(Thailand) Harnsuk Phitsanurachan		Bangkok, Thailand	Decision	5	3:00
1979-04-	Win	(Thailand) Densiam Sor.Prateep		Prakhon Chai district, Thailand	Decision	5	3:00
1979-01-24	Win	(Thailand) Chumphae Srisompop		Bangkok, Thailand	Decision	5	3:00
1978-11-22	Win	(Thailand) Daokanong Sitsaneh	Rajadamnern Stadium	Bangkok, Thailand	KO (Punches)	4	
1978-10-21	Win	(Thailand) Mongkhonrit Laemfahfah	Rajadamnern Stadium	Bangkok, Thailand	KO (Punches)	2	
1978-09-23	Win	(Thailand) Arunnoi Luklamphakchi		Bangkok, Thailand	Decision	5	3:00
1978-06-10	Win	(Thailand) Dongphaya Sit Sathit		Bangkok, Thailand	KO	2	
1978-04-08	Win	(Thailand) Chanwit Sitsomsak		Bangkok, Thailand	Decision	5	3:00
Legend: Win Loss Draw/No contest Notes
