= Saencherng Pinsinchai =

Thai former professional Muay Thai fighter

- Born: Panom Pachano; September 15, 1967 (age 59); Nang Rong (now Chamni), Buriram, Thailand
- Native name: พนม ภาชะโน
- Other names: Saencherng Naruepai (แสนเชิง นฤภัย)
- Nickname: Stone Man (มนุษย์หิน); Stone Mountain (ภูผาหิน); Xue Rengui (ซิยิ่นกุ้ย)
- Height: 1.68 m (5 ft 6 in)
- Division: Mini Flyweight; Flyweight; Super Flyweight; Bantamweight; Super Bantamweight; Featherweight; Super Featherweight
- Style: Muay Thai (Muay Femur)
- Stance: Orthodox
- Team: Pinsinchai
- Years active: c. 1970s-1989

Other information
- Occupation: Muay Thai trainer

Panom Pachano (Thai: พนม ภาชะโน; born September 15, 1967), known professionally as Saencherng Pinsinchai (Thai: แสนเชิง ปิ่นสินชัย), is a Thai former professional Muay Thai fighter. He is a former four-time Lumpinee Stadium and one-time Rajadamnern Stadium champion across five divisions who was famous during the 1980s. Nicknamed the "Stone Man", he is often regarded amongst the greatest fighters in Muay Thai history.

== Biography & career ==
Panom Pachano was born on September 15, 1967 in Nang Rong (now Chamni), Buriram, Thailand. His father began training him, along with his brothers, in Muay Thai from an early age. He would start his career fighting in the northeastern regions of Thailand. In 1981, he was scouted by Savek Pinsinchai and began to fight under the name of Saencherng Pinsinchai for the Pinsinchai gym.

Saencherng would solidify himself as one of the most dominant fighters of the 80s while capturing four Lumpinee Stadium titles at Mini Flyweight, Flyweight, Super Bantamweight, and Super Featherweight and a Rajadamnern Stadium title at Bantamweight between 1983 and 1989. He'd beat some of the most notable fighters of his era such as Chamuekpet Hapalang, Samransak Muangsurin, Jaroenthong Kiatbanchong, Paruhatlek Sitchunthong, Chanchai Sor Tamarangsri, Manasak Sor Ploenchit and Bangkhlanoi Sor.Thanikul. The largest purse of his career was 250,000 baht, making him one of the few fighters who were paid above the 200,000 baht threshold.

After his retirement, Saencherng became a trainer at Pinsinchai gym in Bangkok.

== Titles & honours ==
- Lumpinee Stadium
  - 1983 Lumpinee Stadium Mini Flyweight (105 lbs) Champion
  - 1984 Lumpinee Stadium Flyweight (112 lbs) Champion
  - 1986 Lumpinee Stadium Super Bantamweight (122 lbs) Champion
  - 1989 Lumpinee Stadium Super Featherweight (130 lbs) Champion
- Rajadamnern Stadium
  - 1984 Rajadamnern Stadium Bantamweight (118 lbs) Champion

== Fight record ==
Muay Thai Record
Date	Result	Opponent	Event	Location	Method	Round	Time
1989-10-06	Loss	(Thailand) Cherry Sor.Wanich	Lumpinee Stadium	Bangkok, Thailand	Decision	5	3:00
For the Lumpinee Stadium Super Featherweight (130 lbs) title.
1989-08-29	Win	(Thailand) Jaroenthong Kiatbanchong	Lumpinee Stadium	Bangkok, Thailand	Decision	5	3:00
1989-07-25	Loss	(Thailand) Cherry Sor.Wanich	Lumpinee Stadium	Bangkok, Thailand	Decision	5	3:00
Loses the Lumpinee Stadium Super Featherweight (130 lbs) title.
1989-05-02	Win	(Thailand) Manasak Sor Ploenchit	Lumpinee Stadium	Bangkok, Thailand	Decision	5	3:00
1989-03-10	Win	(Thailand) Prasert Kittikasem	Lumpinee Stadium	Bangkok, Thailand	KO	3	
Wins the Lumpinee Stadium Super Featherweight (130 lbs) title.
1988-05-03	Win	(Thailand) Prasert Kittikasem	Lumpinee Stadium	Bangkok, Thailand	Decision	5	3:00
1988-01-26	Loss	(Thailand) Chanchai Sor.Tamarangsri	Lumpinee Stadium	Bangkok, Thailand	Decision	5	3:00
For the Lumpinee Stadium Featherweight (126 lbs) title.
1987-11-27	Draw	(Thailand) Chanchai Sor.Tamarangsri	Lumpinee Stadium	Bangkok, Thailand	Decision	5	3:00
1987-06-19	Loss	(Thailand) Manasak Sor.Ploenchit	Lumpinee Stadium	Bangkok, Thailand	TKO (Doctor stoppage)	2	
1987-03-31	Win	(Thailand) Chamuekpet Hapalang	Lumpinee Stadium	Bangkok, Thailand	Decision	5	3:00
1986-12-19	Win	(Thailand) Samransak Muangsurin	Huamark Stadium	Bangkok, Thailand	Decision	5	3:00
Wins the Lumpinee Stadium Super Bantamweight (122 lbs) title.
1986-09-09	Win	(Thailand) Chanchai Sor.Tamarangsri	Lumpinee Stadium	Bangkok, Thailand	Decision	5	3:00
1986-04-23	Loss	(Thailand) Jampatong Na Nontachai	Rajadamnern Stadium	Bangkok, Thailand	KO (left high kick)	2	
1986-03-12	Win	(Thailand) Jongrak Lukprabaht	Rajadamnern Stadium	Bangkok, Thailand	Decision	5	3:00
1985-12-26	Loss	(Thailand) Sangtiennoi Sor.Rungroj	Rajadamnern Stadium	Bangkok, Thailand	Decision	5	3:00
1985-07-17	Loss	(Thailand) Manasak Sor.Ploenchit	Rajadamnern Stadium	Bangkok, Thailand	Decision	5	3:00
1985-03-06	Loss	(Thailand) Samransak Muangsurin		Bangkok, Thailand	KO	3	
1984-12-26	Win	(Thailand) Nikhom Phetphothong	Rajadamnern Stadium	Bangkok, Thailand	Decision	5	3:00
Wins the Rajadamnern Stadium Bantamweight (118 lbs) title.
1984-09-06	Win	(Thailand) Bangkhlanoi Sor.Thanikul	Rajadamnern Stadium	Bangkok, Thailand	Decision	5	3:00
1984-07-10	Win	(Thailand) Chamuekpet Hapalang	Lumpinee Stadium	Bangkok, Thailand	Decision	5	3:00
1984-04-24	Win	(Thailand) Phayanoi Sor.Thasanee	Lumpinee Stadium	Bangkok, Thailand	Decision	5	3:00
1984-03-30	Win	(Thailand) Klaisapthaphee Majestic	Lumpinee Stadium	Bangkok, Thailand	KO	3	
Wins the vacant Lumpinee Stadium Flyweight (112 lbs) title.
1983-12-26	Win	(Thailand) Paruhatlek Sitchunthong	Lumpinee Stadium	Bangkok, Thailand	Decision	5	3:00
1983-11-11	Win	(Thailand) Pongdet Chomputhong	Lumpinee Stadium	Bangkok, Thailand	Decision	5	3:00
Wins the vacant Lumpinee Stadium Mini Flyweight (105 lbs) title.
1983-10-	Win	(Thailand) Chakphetnoi Sitsei	Lumpinee Stadium	Bangkok, Thailand	Decision	5	3:00
1983-09-13	Win	(Thailand) Supernoi Sitchokchai	Lumpinee Stadium	Bangkok, Thailand	Decision	5	3:00
1983-	Win	(Thailand) Kaopong Sitmorbon	Lumpinee Stadium	Bangkok, Thailand	Decision	5	3:00
1983-06-07	Win	(Thailand) Sanit Wichitkriengkrai	Lumpinee Stadium	Bangkok, Thailand	Decision	5	3:00
1983-	Win	(Thailand) Saenthanongnoi Phettaveechai	Lumpinee Stadium	Bangkok, Thailand	Decision	5	3:00
1983-	Win	(Thailand) Sittichok Monsongkram	Lumpinee Stadium	Bangkok, Thailand	Decision	5	3:00
1983-01-10	Win	(Thailand) Chainiyom Sitsaart	Rajadamnern Stadium	Bangkok, Thailand	Decision	5	3:00
1982-11-17	Win	(Thailand) Kumanthong Kaewtai	Rajadamnern Stadium	Bangkok, Thailand	Decision	5	3:00
1982-	Win	(Thailand) Warunee Sor.Ploenchit	Lumpinee Stadium	Bangkok, Thailand	Decision	5	3:00
	Win	(Thailand) Sitthi Phetmuangloi	Lumpinee Stadium	Bangkok, Thailand	Decision	5	3:00
Saencherng's first fight in a major Bangkok stadium.
Legend: Win Loss Draw/No contest Notes
