= Jongrak Lukprabaht =

Thai Muay Thai fighter

- Born: Jongrak Soree; July 24, 1966; Mueang Chai Nat, Chai Nat, Thailand
- Died: February 8, 2022 (age 56); Lung cancer
- Native name: จงรัก โสรี
- Other names: Naksu Sor.Manatchai (นักสู้ ส.มนัสชัย); Jongrak KaiAdisorn (จงรักษ์ ค่ายอดิศร)
- Nickname: Fire Cobra จงอางไฟ (Jong Ang Fai)
- Height: 170 cm (5 ft 7 in)
- Division: Bantamweight; Super Bantamweight; Featherweight; Super Featherweight; Lightweight
- Style: Muay Thai (Muay Femur)
- Stance: Orthodox
- Team: Lukprabaht Gym
- Years active: c. 1977-1994

Jongrak Soree (Thai: จงรัก โสรี; born July 24, 1966), known professionally as Jongrak Lukprabaht (Thai: จงรักษ์ ลูกพระบาท), was a Thai professional Muay Thai fighter. He was a three-division Rajadamnern Stadium Champion during the 1980s and 1990s. Nicknamed "Fire Cobra" in reference to Wichannoi Porntawee's nickname "King Cobra That Protects His Eggs (จงอางหวงไข่)" for his seven title defenses streak of the Rajadamnern Stadium Super Bantamweight belt.

== Career and biography ==
Born to farmers, the third of four children, Jongrak started fighting at a young age to earn money by himself and not burden his family. He briefly lived at a temple in Sapphaya District and trained out of Sor.Thianprasert Gym. Jongrak had his first fight at 11 under the name Naksu Sor.Manatchai. After winning and receiving a purse of 70 baht, he continued fighting at various temple fairs and eventually moved to live at Sor.Manatchai gym alongside his camp senior Daengnoi for a year.

They fought to escape poverty so they never returned home as there wasn't enough food to eat. In Lopburi they stayed with a benefactor who would bring them to Hia Noi Wuttisopakorn, the owner of Lukprabaht gym. There, Jongrak took on the Lukprabaht name. Jongrak gained experience in the provincial scene, fighting regularly around Lopburi and at Fort Adisorn in Saraburi.

Jongrak got to fight at the Lumpinee Stadium for the first time in 1982 as a replacement for stablemate Daengnoi who fell ill. Throughout 1983 and 1984 Jongrak started to get more opportunities under Songchai Rattanasuban's Onesongchai Promotion and Chaiwat Chatuwat's Chatuchok Promotion with mixed results. He started the year 1985 on a bad run, including a loss to Wisanupon Saksamut. Nearing the end of the year, Jongrak defeated Bandon Sitbangprachan who had just won the Featherweight title against Yoknoi Fairtex by TKO the month before. The win earned Jongrak a spot on OneSongchai's big Lumpinee Stadium 29th Birthday Show against defending Lumpinee Stadium Bantamweight champion Chanchai Sor.Tamarangsri. Jongrak would lose to Chanchai via a wide decision, and his stablemate Fahlan Lukprabaht lost a vacant Lumpinee Light Flyweight title fight to Paruhatlek Sitchunthong on the same card. This marked the end of Lukprabaht Gym's contracts with Lumpinee Stadium promoters.

At the end of 1985, Lukprabaht owner Hia Noi gradually transferred his fighters to the main promoters of Rajadamnern Stadium, Sai Leetawornchai (เส่ย ลี้ถาวรชัย) of the One Muay Thai Promotion (ศึกวันมวยไทย), and Banchu Ongsaengkun (บรรจุ อ่องแสงคุณ) of the "Mumnamngern" (ศึกมุมน้ำเงิน) Promotion. Jongrak would break out as a premier star soon after crossing stadiums. In the following year, Jongrak won his first career title, the Rajadamnern Featherweight belt against Kengkajnoi Kiatniwat, avenging a close loss to Kengkajnoi on his 20th birthday.

In 1991 Jongrak defeated Panomtuanlek Hapalang by doctor stoppage before taking the Rajadamnern Super Featherweight title from Kongnapa Watcharawit on June 10, 1991. Jongrak went on to defend the title seven times over two years before losing it to Robert Kaennorasing.

In his last fight, Jongrak faced Rajasak Sor.Vorapin, a fight that he lost narrowly by decision. Despite still having a 120,000 baht purse, Jongrak, then 28, retired as he had been suffering from back pain and insomnia. He enlisted into the Royal Thai Army almost immediately after deciding to retire without telling Hia Noi Lukprabaht and spent over 20 years serving in the military, earning the rank of Sergeant Major.

== Death ==
Early in March, 2021, Jongrak started experiencing numbness in his arms and legs and started to have trouble walking, suddenly becoming bedridden. He was diagnosed with stage 4 lung cancer at Lopburi Cancer Hospital and it was found that the cancer had metastasized to his spinal cord. The cancer had gone undetected despite Jongrak having to undergo annual physical exams at Adisorn (Fort) Military Camp.

During his time at the hospital, his wife and several of his former stablemates, notably Komphet Lukprabaht, helped his family financially and prepared papers to request additional aid from the Sports Authority of Thailand. Despite having gone through extensive radiation therapy, Jongrak passed away on February 8, 2022, less than a year after he was diagnosed with cancer. He left behind his wife and twin sons who were 19 years old at the time of his passing.

== Titles and accomplishments ==
- Rajadamnern Stadium
  - 1986 Rajadamnern Stadium Featherweight (126 lbs) Champion
    - Three successful title defenses
  - 1989 2x Rajadamnern Stadium Lightweight (135 lbs) Champion
  - 1991 Rajadamnern Stadium Super Featherweight (130 lbs) Champion
    - Seven successful title defenses

== Fight record ==
Muay Thai Record
Date	Result	Opponent	Event	Location	Method	Round	Time
1994-11-09	Loss	(Thailand) Rajasak Sor.Vorapin	Palangnum, Rajadamnern Stadium	Bangkok, Thailand	Decision	5	3:00
1994-10-12	Loss	(Thailand) Rajasak Sor.Vorapin	Palangnum, Rajadamnern Stadium	Bangkok, Thailand	Decision	5	3:00
1994-06-08	Loss	(Thailand) Namkabuan Nongkeepahuyuth	Rajadamnern Stadium	Bangkok, Thailand	Decision	5	3:00
1994-04-20	Win	(Thailand) Angkarndej Por.Paoin	Palangnum, Rajadamnern Stadium	Bangkok, Thailand	Decision	5	3:00
1994-01-26	Loss	(Thailand) Namkabuan Nongkeepahuyuth	Palangnum, Rajadamnern Stadium	Bangkok, Thailand	Decision	5	3:00
1993-11-10	Loss	(Thailand) Robert Kaennorasing	Rajadamnern Stadium	Bangkok, Thailand	Decision	5	3:00
For the Rajadamnern Stadium Super Featherweight (130 lbs) title.
1993-10-06	Draw	(Thailand) Robert Kaennorasing	Rajadamnern Stadium	Bangkok, Thailand	Decision (Split)	5	3:00
For the Rajadamnern Stadium Super Featherweight (130 lbs) title.
1993-07-21	Loss	(Thailand) Robert Kaennorasing	Mumnangoen, Rajadamnern Stadium	Bangkok, Thailand	Decision (Majority)	5	3:00
Loses Rajadamnern Stadium Super Featherweight (130 lbs) title.
1993-06-07	Win	(Thailand) Samaisuek Por.Pluemkamol	Petchthongkham, Rajadamnern Stadium	Bangkok, Thailand	Decision	5	3:00
Defends the Rajadamnern Stadium Super Featherweight (130 lbs) title.
1993-05-03	Win	(Thailand) Samaisuek Por.Pluemkamol	Rajadamnern Stadium	Bangkok, Thailand	Decision (Unanimous)	5	3:00
Defends the Rajadamnern Stadium Super Featherweight (130 lbs) title.
1993-01-23	Win	(Thailand) Yodrak Wor.Kuasang	Rajadamnern Stadium	Bangkok, Thailand	KO	4	
1992-11-25	Win	(Thailand) Yodrak Wor.Kuasang	Rajadamnern Stadium	Bangkok, Thailand	KO (Punch)	2	
Defends the Rajadamnern Stadium Super Featherweight (130 lbs) title.
1992-09-30	Win	(Thailand) Poonsawat Kiatniwat	Palangnum, Rajadamnern Stadium	Bangkok, Thailand	Decision	5	3:00
Defends the Rajadamnern Stadium Super Featherweight (130 lbs) title.
1992-05-25	Win	(Thailand) Yodrak Wor.Kuasang	Rajadamnern Stadium	Bangkok, Thailand	KO	2	
1992-03-23	Win	(Thailand) Saenthanong Por.Chaiwat	Rajadamnern Stadium	Bangkok, Thailand	Decision	5	3:00
Defends the Rajadamnern Stadium Super Featherweight (130 lbs) title.
1991-10-21	Loss	(Thailand) Taweechai Wor.Preecha	Rajadamnern Stadium	Bangkok, Thailand	Decision	5	3:00
1991-08-15	Win	(Thailand) Kongnapa Watcharawit	Rajadamnern Stadium	Bangkok, Thailand	Decision	5	3:00
Defends the Rajadamnern Stadium Super Featherweight (130 lbs) title.
1991-06-10	Win	(Thailand) Kongnapa Watcharawit	Yod Nuam Thong, Rajadamnern Stadium	Bangkok, Thailand	Decision	5	3:00
Wins the Rajadamnern Stadium Super Featherweight (130 lbs) title.
1991-05-13	Win	(Thailand) Panomtuanlek Hapalang	Rajadamnern Stadium	Bangkok, Thailand	TKO (Doctor stoppage)	2	
1991-03-20	Win	(Thailand) Panomtuanlek Hapalang	Wan Muay Thai, Rajadamnern Stadium	Bangkok, Thailand	Decision	5	3:00
1991-01-30	Loss	(Thailand) Panomtuanlek Hapalang	Rajadamnern Stadium	Bangkok, Thailand	Decision	5	3:00
1991-01-03	Win	(Thailand) Payaklek Yutthakit		Bangkok, Thailand	Decision	5	3:00
1990-12-12	Win	(Thailand) Kwanchai Kiatpetchnoi	Palangnum, Rajadamnern Stadium	Bangkok, Thailand	Decision	5	3:00
1990-11-08	Win	(Thailand) Narak Sitkuanyim	Rajadamnern Stadium	Bangkok, Thailand	Decision	5	3:00
1990-09-06	Win	(Thailand) Narak Sitkuanyim	Yod Muay Thai, Rajadamnern Stadium	Bangkok, Thailand	Decision	5	3:00
1990-07-22	Win	(Thailand) Kongdej Chor.Wiraj	Rajadamnern Stadium	Bangkok, Thailand	Decision	5	3:00
1990-02-22	Loss	(Thailand) Narak Sitkuanyim	Rajadamnern Stadium	Bangkok, Thailand	Decision	5	3:00
Loses the Rajadamnern Stadium Lightweight (135 lbs) title.
1989-	Win	(Thailand) Narak Sitkuanyim	Rajadamnern Stadium	Bangkok, Thailand	Decision	5	3:00
Wins the Rajadamnern Stadium Lightweight (135 lbs) title.
1989-06-28	Loss	(Thailand) Narak Sitkuanyim	Rajadamnern Stadium	Bangkok, Thailand	Decision	5	3:00
Loses the Rajadamnern Stadium Lightweight (135 lbs) title.
1989-05-24	Win	(Thailand) Aima Petchthanin	Rajadamnern Stadium	Bangkok, Thailand	KO (Knee to the body)	3	
1989-03-29	Win	(Thailand) Narak Sitkuanyim	Rajadamnern Stadium	Bangkok, Thailand	Decision	5	3:00
Wins the vacant Rajadamnern Stadium Lightweight (135 lbs) title.
1989-02-15	Win	(Thailand) Mangkorndam Sitchang	Rajadamnern Stadium	Bangkok, Thailand	Decision	5	3:00
1988-06-30	Loss	(Thailand) Thongphet Na Nontachai	Mumnagoen, Rajadamnern Stadium	Bangkok, Thailand	KO (Punches)	2	
1988-03-24	Loss	(Thailand) Poonsawat Sitsornthong	Rajadamnern Stadium	Bangkok, Thailand	Decision	5	3:00
Loses the Rajadamnern Stadium Featherweight (126 lbs) title.
1987-12-23	Win	(Thailand) Ruengnoi Chomputhong	Blue Corner, Rajadamnern Stadium	Bangkok, Thailand	KO (Punch)	3	
Defends the Rajadamnern Stadium Featherweight (126 lbs) title.
1987-11-26	Loss	(Thailand) Sangtiennoi Sitsurapong	Rajadamnern Stadium	Bangkok, Thailand	Decision	5	3:00
1987-10-01	Win	(Thailand) Ruengnoi Chomputhong	Rajadamnern Stadium	Bangkok, Thailand	Decision	5	3:00
1987-08-27	Win	(Thailand) Sapaphet Kiatphetnoi	Rajadamnern Stadium	Bangkok, Thailand	Decision	5	3:00
1987-07-23	Loss	(Thailand) Sapaphet Kiatphetnoi	Rajadamnern Stadium	Bangkok, Thailand	Decision	5	3:00
1987-06-15	Loss	(Thailand) Ruengnoi Chomputhong	Rajadamnern Stadium	Bangkok, Thailand	Decision	5	3:00
1987-05-20	Win	(Thailand) Chokdee Kiatpayathai	Rajadamnern Stadium	Bangkok, Thailand	Decision	5	3:00
1987-04-29	Win	(Thailand) Chokdee Kiatpayathai	Wan Muay Thai, Rajadamnern Stadium	Bangkok, Thailand	Decision	5	3:00
Defends the Rajadamnern Stadium Featherweight (126 lbs) title.
1987-02-02	Draw	(Thailand) Sapaphet Kiatphetnoi	Wan Muay Thai, Rajadamnern Stadium	Bangkok, Thailand	Decision	5	3:00
Defends the Rajadamnern Stadium Featherweight (126 lbs) title.
1986-11-11	Loss	(Thailand) Sombat Sor.Thanikul	Ruamnamchai, Lumpinee Stadium	Bangkok, Thailand	Decision	5	3:00
1986-09-25	Win	(Thailand) Kengkajnoi Kiatniwat	Rajadamnern Stadium	Bangkok, Thailand	Decision	5	3:00
Wins the Rajadamnern Stadium Featherweight (126 lbs) title.
1986-08-27	Win	(Thailand) Dong Sor.Sathit	Palangnum, Rajadamnern Stadium	Bangkok, Thailand	Decision	5	3:00
1986-07-24	Loss	(Thailand) Kengkajnoi Kiatniwat	Blue Corner, Rajadamnern Stadium	Bangkok, Thailand	Decision	5	3:00
For the Rajadamnern Stadium Featherweight (126 lbs) title.
1986-06-26	Win	(Thailand) Chokchai Jaroenmuang	Rajadamnern Stadium	Bangkok, Thailand	Decision	5	3:00
1986-05-20	NC	(Thailand) Nikhom Phetpothong	Mumnangoen, Rajadamnern Stadium	Bangkok, Thailand	Nikhom dismissed	5	
1986-04-10	Loss	(Thailand) Weerapong Kiatsarika	Rajadamnern Stadium	Bangkok, Thailand	Decision	5	3:00
1986-03-12	Loss	(Thailand) Saencherng Pinsinchai	Palangnum, Rajadamnern Stadium	Bangkok, Thailand	Decision	5	3:00
1986-01-10	Win	(Thailand) Petchdam Lukborai	Lumpinee Stadium	Bangkok, Thailand	Decision	5	3:00
1985-12-06	Loss	(Thailand) Chanchai Sor.Tamarangsri	Onesongchai, Lumpinee Stadium 29th Anniversary show	Bangkok, Thailand	Decision	5	3:00
1985-11-05	Win	(Thailand) Bandon Sitbangprachan	Onesongchai, Lumpinee Stadium	Bangkok, Thailand	Decision	5	3:00
1985-09-13	Win	(Thailand) Singdaeng Ploysakda	Lumpinee Stadium	Bangkok, Thailand	Decision	5	3:00
1985-07-02	Win	(Thailand) Palannoi Kiatanan	Lumpinee Stadium	Bangkok, Thailand	Decision	5	3:00
1985-05-28	Win	(Thailand) Rak Sakprasong	Onesongchai + Chatuchok, Lumpinee Stadium	Bangkok, Thailand	Decision	5	3:00
1985-03-22	Loss	(Thailand) Rerngsaknoi Por.Ped	Chatuchok, Lumpinee Stadium	Bangkok, Thailand	Decision	5	3:00
1985-02-26	Loss	(Thailand) Wisanupon Saksamut	Onesongchai, Lumpinee Stadium	Bangkok, Thailand	Decision	5	3:00
1984-11-27	Loss	(Thailand) Kanongsuk Sitomnoi	Onesongchai, Lumpinee Stadium	Bangkok, Thailand	Decision	5	3:00
1984-11-06	Win	(Thailand) Sanphet Lukrangsri	Chatuchok, Lumpinee Stadium	Bangkok, Thailand	Decision	5	3:00
1984-09-28	Win	(Thailand) Sanphet Lukrangsri	Onesongchai, Lumpinee Stadium	Bangkok, Thailand	Decision	5	3:00
1984-07-24	Loss	(Thailand) Panrit Luksiharat	Chatuchok, Lumpinee Stadium	Bangkok, Thailand	Decision	5	3:00
1984-06-20	Loss	(Thailand) Sajjap Singkiri	Lumpinee Stadium	Bangkok, Thailand	Decision	5	3:00
1984-05-08	Win	(Thailand) Jomhod Luksamrong	Onesongchai, Lumpinee Stadium	Bangkok, Thailand	Decision	5	3:00
1984-03-02	Loss	(Thailand) Sakkasemnoi Fairtex	Chatuchok, Lumpinee Stadium	Bangkok, Thailand	Decision	5	3:00
1984-02-07	Win	(Thailand) Sakkasemnoi Fairtex	Lumpinee Stadium	Bangkok, Thailand	Decision	5	3:00
1984-01-06	Win	(Thailand) Suraporn Sor.Kiattisak	Lumpinee Stadium	Bangkok, Thailand	Decision	5	3:00
1983-11-25	Win	(Thailand) Pisuj Sor.Jitpattana	Lumpinee Stadium	Bangkok, Thailand	Decision	5	3:00
1983-11-01	Win	(Thailand) Chaiyom Sitsao	Lumpinee Stadium	Bangkok, Thailand	Decision	5	3:00
1983-10-11	Draw	(Thailand) Chaiyom Sitsao	Lumpinee Stadium	Bangkok, Thailand	Decision	5	3:00
1983-09-15	Win	(Thailand) Chanchai Sor.Tamarangsri		Saraburi province, Thailand	Decision	5	3:00
1983-07-19	Loss	(Thailand) Samernoi Sor.Saranya	Chatuchok, Lumpinee Stadium	Bangkok, Thailand	Decision	5	3:00
1983-07-05	Win	(Thailand) Komes Sakniran	Onesongchai, Lumpinee Stadium	Bangkok, Thailand	Decision	5	3:00
1983-06-03	Loss	(Thailand) Samernoi Sor.Saranya	Chatuchok, Lumpinee Stadium	Bangkok, Thailand	Decision	5	3:00
1983-05-07	NC	(Thailand) Lomsayam Sor.Woran		Bangkok, Thailand	Lomsayam dismissed	5	
1983-04-22	Win	(Thailand) Morakot Sitsao	Chatuchok, Lumpinee Stadium	Bangkok, Thailand	Decision	5	3:00
1983-03-18	Win	(Thailand) Kumanthong Krajokthai	Chatuchok, Lumpinee Stadium	Bangkok, Thailand	Decision	5	3:00
1983-02-15	Win	(Thailand) Rakrad JockyGym	Lumpinee Stadium	Bangkok, Thailand	Decision	5	3:00
1983-01-20	Win	(Thailand) Lomkrotnoi Phaniagthong	Lumpinee Stadium	Bangkok, Thailand	Decision	5	3:00
1982-12-05	Win	(Thailand) Montree Sor.Jarunee	Sanam Luang	Bangkok, Thailand	Decision	5	3:00
1982-10-20	Loss	(Thailand) Rakrad JockyGym	Chatuchok, Lumpinee Stadium	Bangkok, Thailand	Decision	5	3:00
Legend: Win Loss Draw/No contest Notes
