= Saengsakda Kittikasem =

Thai former professional Muay Thai fighter

- Born: Armin Gader; October 24, 1956 (age 69); Mueang Pattani, Thailand
- Nickname: Armin The Drunken Punch (ไอ้มิงหมัดเมา)
- Height: 171 cm (5 ft 7 in)
- Division: Super Bantamweight
- Style: Muay Thai, Boxing
- Stance: Orthodox
- Team: Kittikasem
- Trainer: Heng Singsamai, Kitti Akrasanee

Armin Gader (Thai: อามิง กาเดร์; born October 24, 1956), known professionally as Saengsakda Kittikasem (Thai: แสงศักดา กิตติเกษม), is a Thai former professional Muay Thai fighter. He is a former Lumpinee Stadium Super Bantamweight Champion.

== Biography and career ==
Saengsakda started training at the age of 14 at the Singsamai camp in the Pattani province under Heng Singsamai. He competed over 50 times in various provinces under the name Joe Louis Singsamai before joining the Kittikasem camp to start his Bangkok career. Under Kitti Akrasanee he changed from a knee fighting style to a punching one.

A heavy handed fighter Saengsakda became a fan favorite of the stadiums and earned the nickname of Drunken Punch for his ability to make his opponents stagger. On April 13, 1981, he captured the Lumpinee Stadium 122 lbs title when he knocked out reigning champion Lom-Isan Sor.Thanikul in the third round.

Saengsakda was a marking figure of the 1980s Muay Thai circuit. He defeated notable opponents of his era such as Paruhat Loh-ngoen, Wanpadet Sitkrumai or Jitti Muangkhonkaen. He faced Samransak Muangsurin three times, winning the first bout by knockout. He lost the rematch and his Lumpinee stadium title a month later in a fight where Saengsakda couldn't maintain his lead after scoring a knockdown and saw Samransak win by last minute comeback knockout.

Saengsakda also fought under boxing rules, he faced Muay Thai legend Dieselnoi Chor Thanasukarn on August 4, 1981, with an 800,000 baht side-bet at stake at the Lumpinee stadium. He won by knockout in the second round.

Saengsakda stopped competing in 1988 and became the regular sparring partner of IBF and WBC world champion boxer Muangchai Kittikasem. After retiring from the fighting world he got involved with a DBS Production, a company working on the production and recording of musicians. In 2022 Saengsakda suffered a stroke, he survived but lost the use of the left side of his body.

== Titles and accomplishments ==
- Lumpinee Stadium
  - 1981 Lumpinee Stadium Super Bantamweight (122 lbs) Champion
    - Two successful title defenses

== Professional boxing record ==
2 fights	2 wins	0 losses
By knockout	2	0

No.	Result	Record	Opponent	Type	Round	Date	Location	Notes
2	Win	2-0	(Thailand) Aisu Sor.Chaicharoenkit	KO	4	April 20, 1985	Bangkok, Thailand	
1	Win	1-0	(Thailand) Dieselnoi Chor Thanasukarn	KO	2	August 4, 1981	Lumpinee Stadium, Bangkok, Thailand	

== Muay Thai record ==
Muay Thai Record
Date	Result	Opponent	Event	Location	Method	Round	Time
1988-	Loss	(Thailand) Jombung Sakniran		Ratchaburi province, Thailand	Decision	5	3:00
1988-11-18	Loss	(Thailand) Dennarong Devy	Rajadamnern Stadium	Bangkok, Thailand	Decision	5	3:00
1988-10-07	Draw	(Thailand) Dennarong Devy	Lumpinee Stadium	Bangkok, Thailand	Decision	5	3:00
1988-08-09	Loss	(Thailand) Narongchai Thairungruang	Lumpinee Stadium	Bangkok, Thailand	Decision	5	3:00
1988-05-24	Win	(Thailand) Den Muangsurin	Lumpinee Stadium	Bangkok, Thailand	Decision	5	3:00
1988-03-09	Loss	(Thailand) Yoknoi Fairtex	Rajadamnern Stadium	Bangkok, Thailand	KO (Punches)	2	
1987-10-06	Loss	(Thailand) Daengnoi Lukphrabat	Lumpinee Stadium	Bangkok, Thailand	Decision	5	3:00
1987-03-10	Win	(Thailand) Phayaphueng Eakmit	Lumpinee Stadium	Bangkok, Thailand	Decision	5	3:00
1986-11-25	Loss	(Thailand) Bandon Sitbangprachan	Onesongchai, Lumpinee Stadium	Bangkok, Thailand	KO (Left hook)	2	
1986-10-14	Loss	(Thailand) Sanit Wichitkriengkrai	Lumpinee Stadium	Bangkok, Thailand	Decision	5	3:00
1986-09-09	Loss	(Thailand) Samransak Muangsurin	Lumpinee Stadium	Bangkok, Thailand	KO (Right cross)	1	1:15
1986-07-18	Loss	(Thailand) Yoknoi Fairtex	Lumpinee Stadium	Bangkok, Thailand	Decision	5	3:00
1986-06-13	Loss	(Thailand) Samransak Muangsurin	Lumpinee Stadium	Bangkok, Thailand	KO (Punches)	5	
Loses the Lumpinee Stadium Super Bantamweight (122 lbs) title.
1986-05-06	Win	(Thailand) Samransak Muangsurin	Lumpinee Stadium	Bangkok, Thailand	KO (Left hook)	2	
1986-03-18	Win	(Thailand) Bandon Sitbangprachan	Lumpinee Stadium	Bangkok, Thailand	KO	1	
1985-10-14	Win	(Thailand) Kongdej Sithow		Bangkok, Thailand	TKO	3	
1985-09-04	Loss	(Thailand) Pornsaknoi Sitchang	Rajadamnern Stadium	Bangkok, Thailand	Decision	5	3:00
1985-07-05	Win	(Thailand) Chokdee Kiatphayathai	Lumpinee Stadium	Bangkok, Thailand	Decision	5	3:00
Defends the Lumpinee Stadium Super Bantamweight (122 lbs) title.
1985-03-08	Win	(Thailand) Chokdee Kiatphayathai	Lumpinee Stadium	Bangkok, Thailand	Decision	5	3:00
1984-10-02	Loss	(Thailand) Panmongkol Hor.Mahachai	Lumpinee Stadium	Bangkok, Thailand	Decision	5	3:00
1984-06-05	Win	(Thailand) Phisek Thanakorn	Lumpinee Stadium	Bangkok, Thailand	KO	1	
Defends the Lumpinee Stadium Super Bantamweight (122 lbs) title.
1984-05-12	Win	(Thailand) Maewnoi Sitchang		Bangkok, Thailand	KO	2	
1984-04-27	Win	(Thailand) Samingnum Por.Tawatchai		Bangkok, Thailand	KO	2	
1984-03-20	Win	(Thailand) Pon Sor.Thanikul		Bangkok, Thailand	KO	3	
1984-01-03	Loss	(Thailand) Saphapetch Kiatphetnoi		Bangkok, Thailand	Decision	5	3:00
1983-11-04	Loss	(Thailand) Ruengnimit Sor.Thanikul		Yala, Thailand	Decision	5	3:00
1983-10-21	Loss	(Thailand) Khunponnoi Terdthai	Chaomangkon, Lumpinee Stadium	Bangkok, Thailand	KO (Right hook)	3	
1983-06-21	Loss	(Thailand) Chombueng Sakniran		Bangkok, Thailand	Decision	5	3:00
1983-02-06	Loss	(Thailand) Sapapetch Kaiphetnoi		Bangkok, Thailand	Decision	5	3:00
1982-11-05	Win	(Thailand) Sakda Boonroj		Bangkok, Thailand	KO	2	
1982-08-06	Loss	(Thailand) Lom-Isan Sor.Thanikul	Lumpinee Stadium	Bangkok, Thailand	Decision	5	3:00
1982-04-02	Win	(Thailand) Wanpadet Sitkrumai	Lumpinee Stadium	Bangkok, Thailand	KO (Punch)	2	
1982-02-05	Loss	(Thailand) Mangkon Kiewsitchang	Lumpinee Stadium	Bangkok, Thailand	Decision	5	3:00
1981-11-13	Loss	(Thailand) Kengkaj Kiatkriangkrai	Fairtex, Lumpinee Stadium	Bangkok, Thailand	Decision	5	3:00
1981-10-05	Loss	(Thailand) Padejsuk Pitsanurachan	Rajadamnern Stadium	Bangkok, Thailand	Decision	5	3:00
1981-05-08	Win	(Thailand) Jitti Muangkhonkaen	Lumpinee Stadium	Bangkok, Thailand	KO (Punch)	3	
1981-04-03	Win	(Thailand) Lom-Isan Sor.Thanikul	Lumpinee Stadium	Bangkok, Thailand	KO	3	
Wins the Lumpinee Stadium Super Bantamweight (122 lbs) title.
1981-03-03	Win	(Thailand) Jitti Muangkhonkaen	Lumpinee Stadium	Bangkok, Thailand	KO	5	
1981-01-09	Win	(Thailand) Dennarong Saksandee	Lumpinee Stadium	Bangkok, Thailand	KO	4	
1980-10-17	Win	(Thailand) Paruhat Loh-ngern	Lumpinee Stadium	Bangkok, Thailand	KO (Punches)	4	
1980-09-02	Win	(Thailand) Atthapee Boonroj	Lumpinee Stadium	Bangkok, Thailand	KO (Right cross)	4	
1980-07-15	Win	(Thailand) Boontham Wibunchai		Bangkok, Thailand	KO	2	
1980-05-27	Loss	(Thailand) Sakda Boonroj	Lumpinee Stadium	Bangkok, Thailand	Decision	5	3:00
1980-05-06	Win	(Thailand) Jintadet Saknirun		Bangkok, Thailand	Decision	5	3:00
1980-04-01	Win	(Thailand) Donyang Sakasem		Bangkok, Thailand	Decision	5	3:00
1979-09-17	Loss	(Thailand) Kongnapha Kiatkraisorn	Rajadamnern Stadium	Bangkok, Thailand	Decision	5	3:00
1978-04-06	Loss	(Thailand) Kaopong Sitchuchai		Hat Yai, Thailand	Decision	5	3:00
1978-02-08	Loss	(Thailand) Khunponnoi Kiatsuriya	Rajadamnern Stadium	Bangkok, Thailand	Decision	5	3:00
1977-12-21	Win	(Thailand) Seemok Surakorsang		Bangkok, Thailand	KO	1	
1977-08-04	Loss	(Thailand) Nanfah Siharatdecho	Rajadamnern Stadium	Bangkok, Thailand	Ref stop. (dismissed)	4	
1977-07-14	Win	(Thailand) Ruanphae Sitwatnang		Bangkok, Thailand	KO	4	
1977-05-30	Win	(Thailand) Seksan Sor.Theppitak		Bangkok, Thailand	Decision	5	3:00
1977-04-28	Win	(Thailand) Thongsak Sitpordaeng	Rajadamnern Stadium	Bangkok, Thailand	Decision	5	3:00
1977-03-	Loss	(Thailand) Denthoraneenoi Ludthaksin		Hat Yai, Thailand	Decision	5	3:00
1977-02-17	Win	(Thailand) Thongsak Sitpordaeng		Bangkok, Thailand	Decision	5	3:00
1976-10-27	Loss	(Thailand) Chansak Porntawee		Bangkok, Thailand	KO	3	
1976-09-27	Win	(Thailand) Thongsak Sitpordaeng	Rajadamnern Stadium	Bangkok, Thailand	Decision	5	3:00
1976-07-29	Loss	(Thailand) Paruhat Loh-ngern	Rajadamnern Stadium	Bangkok, Thailand	Decision	5	3:00
1976-06-24	Loss	(Thailand) Jintadej Sakniran	Rajadamnern Stadium	Bangkok, Thailand	Decision	5	3:00
1976-05-14	Win	(Thailand) Ruenphae Sitwatnang	Lumpinee Stadium	Bangkok, Thailand	Decision	5	3:00
1976-04-21	Win	(Thailand) Klairung Lookchaomaesaithong		Bangkok, Thailand	Decision	5	3:00
1976-03-31	Win	(Thailand) Chansak Singwattana		Bangkok, Thailand	KO	1	
1976-02-26	Win	(Thailand) Fakaew Surakorsang	Rajadamnern Stadium	Bangkok, Thailand	Decision	5	3:00
1976-01-22	Loss	(Thailand) Kanchai Porntawee		Bangkok, Thailand	Decision	5	3:00
Legend: Win Loss Draw/No contest Notes
