= Chanchai Sor.Tamarangsri =

Thai former professional Muay Thai fighter

- Born: Chanchai Kongkraphan; 19 October 1967 (age 59); Pak Chong, Nakhon Ratchasima, Thailand
- Native name: ชาญชัย คงกระพัน
- Other names: Chanchai Sor.Kiatdisak (ชาญชัย ศ.เกียรติศักดิ์)
- Nickname: Poot 2 (พุฒิ 2)
- Height: 167 cm (5 ft 6 in)
- Division: Light Flyweight; Bantamweight; Featherweight; Super Featherweight; Lightweight
- Style: Muay Thai (Muay Femur)
- Stance: Orthodox
- Team: Sor.Kiatdisak Gym (1978-1984); Sor.Tamarangsri Gym (1984-1996)
- Years active: c. 1978–1996

Kickboxing record
- Total: 250
- Wins: 226
- Losses: 20
- Draws: 4

Chanchai Kongkraphan (Thai: ชาญชัย คงกระพัน; born October 19, 1967), known professionally as Chanchai Sor.Tamarangsri (Thai: ชาญชัย ส.ธรรมรังสี), is a Thai former professional Muay Thai fighter. He is a former three-time Lumpinee Stadium across two divisions who was famous in the 1980s and 1990s. Nicknamed "Poot 2", he was especially known for his teep and is often considered amongst the greatest technicians in Muay Thai history.

== Biography and career ==
Chanchai started training at the age of 11 in his hometown of Pak Chong at the Sor.Kiatdisak camp, he was inspired by his father, who was himself a fighter. At 17 he joined the Tamarangsri gym in the Nakhon Ratchasima Province and made his debut in Bangkok the same year.

Chanchai was a highly regarded technician with one of the best teep kicks in Muay Thai history. He was nicknamed Poot 2 in reference to the Muay Thai legend of the 70s Poot Lorlek. He fought for the biggest promoter of the time Songchai Rattanasuban and had purses going as high as 180,000 THB.

Since his retirement Chanchai teaches physical education in schools and Muay Thai in various camps. He is regularly consulted by the Sports Authority of Thailand to help at the preservation of Muay Thai knowledge, in 2016 he received the award for Muay Thai ambassador of the year.

== Titles & honours ==
- Lumpinee Stadium
  - 1985 Lumpinee Stadium Bantamweight (118 lbs) Champion
    - Two successful title defenses
  - 1986 Lumpinee Stadium Bantamweight (118 lbs) Champion
    - One successful title defense
  - 1987 Lumpinee Stadium Featherweight (126 lbs) Champion
    - Two successful title defenses
- World Muay Thai Association
  - 1989 WMTA Super Featherweight (130 lbs) Champion
- Channel 7 Stadium
  - 1995 Channel 7 Stadium Lightweight (135 lbs) Champion
- Omnoi Stadium
  - 1996 6th Isuzu Cup Tournament Runner-up

== Fight record ==
Muay Thai Record (Incomplete)
226 Wins, 35 Losses, 4 Draws
Date	Result	Opponent	Event	Location	Method	Round	Time
1996-	Loss	(Thailand) Tappaya Sit-Or		Songkhla, Thailand	Decision	5	3:00
1996-03-16	Loss	(Thailand) Suwitlek Sor.Kaokarat	Omnoi Stadium - Isuzu Cup Final	Samut Sakhon, Thailand	Decision	5	3:00
For the Isuzu Cup and WMC World Lightweight (135 lbs) titles.
1995-11-11	Win	(Thailand) Thepparit Tor.Tawatchai	Omnoi Stadium - Isuzu Cup	Samut Sakhon, Thailand	Decision	5	3:00
1995-09-30	Loss	(Thailand) M-16 Bor.Kor.Sor	Omnoi Stadium - Isuzu Cup	Samut Sakhon, Thailand	Decision	5	3:00
1995-08-06	Win	(Thailand) Chalunlap Sor.Rungroj	Channel 7 Stadium	Bangkok, Thailand	Decision	5	3:00
Wins the Channel 7 Stadium Lightweight (135 lbs) title.
1995-05-14	Win	(Thailand) Tappaya Sit-Or	Channel 7 Stadium	Bangkok, Thailand	Decision	5	3:00
1995-03-19	Win	(Thailand) Khunpon Kaewsamrit	Channel 7 Stadium	Bangkok, Thailand	Decision	5	3:00
1995-02-05	Win	(Thailand) Mantai Sakmethee	Channel 7 Stadium	Bangkok, Thailand	Decision	5	3:00
?	Win	(Thailand) Pepsi Biyapan		Bangkok, Thailand	Decision	5	3:00
1994-07-18	NC	(Thailand) Kukrit Sor.Nayaiam	Rajadamnern Stadium	Bangkok, Thailand	Chanchai dismissed	5	
1994-05-23	Loss	(Thailand) Rungrit Or.Smit	Rajadamnern Stadium	Bangkok, Thailand	Decision	5	3:00
1994-02-09	Loss	(Thailand) Kongnapa BM Service	Rajadamnern Stadium	Bangkok, Thailand	Decision	5	3:00
1993-11-27	Win	(Thailand) Sangtiennoi Sor.Rungroj	Lumpinee Stadium	Bangkok, Thailand	Decision	5	3:00
1993-10-22	Loss	(Thailand) Sangtiennoi Sor.Rungroj	Lumpinee Stadium	Bangkok, Thailand	Decision	5	3:00
1993-06-11	Loss	(Thailand) Sakmongkol Sithchuchok	Lumpinee Stadium	Bangkok, Thailand	Decision	5	3:00
1993-04-17	Win	(Thailand) Panomrunglek Chor.Sawat	Sanphasitprasong Stadium	Ubon Ratchathani, Thailand	Decision	5	3:00
1993-02-22	Win	(Thailand) Taweechai Wor.Preecha	Rajadamnern Stadium	Bangkok, Thailand	Decision	5	3:00
1992-12-05	Loss	(Thailand) Sakmongkol Sithchuchok	Lumpinee Stadium	Bangkok, Thailand	Decision	5	3:00
1992-11-13	Win	(Thailand) Sangtiennoi Sor.Rungroj	Lumpinee Stadium	Bangkok, Thailand	Decision	5	3:00
1992-10-23	Loss	(Thailand) Jaroenthong Kiatbanchong		Bangkok, Thailand	Decision	5	3:00
1992-09-25	Win	(Thailand) Orono Por Muang Ubon		Bangkok, Thailand	Decision	5	3:00
1992-08-29	Win	(Thailand) Jirasak Por.Pongsawang	Lumpinee Stadium	Bangkok, Thailand	Decision	5	3:00
1992-06-30	Loss	(Thailand) Sakmongkol Sithchuchok	Lumpinee Stadium	Bangkok, Thailand	Decision	5	3:00
1992-03-17	Loss	(Thailand) Sanit Wichitkriengkrai	Lumpinee Stadium	Bangkok, Thailand	Decision	5	3:00
1992-01-07	Loss	(Thailand) Sanit Wichitkriengkrai	Lumpinee Stadium	Bangkok, Thailand	Decision	5	3:00
1991-12-10	Win	(Thailand) Detsak Sakpradu	Lumpinee Stadium	Bangkok, Thailand	Decision	5	3:00
1991-11-15	Win	(Thailand) Khamsanya Tor.Sitthichai		Bangkok, Thailand	Decision	5	3:00
1991-10-15	Win	(Thailand) Klasuk Tor.Wittaya		Bangkok, Thailand	Decision	5	3:00
1991-09-10	Loss	(Thailand) Klasuk Tor.Wittaya	Lumpinee Stadium	Bangkok, Thailand	Decision	5	3:00
1991-07-02	Loss	(Thailand) Coban Lookchaomaesaitong	Lumpinee Stadium	Bangkok, Thailand	KO	1	
1991-06-01	Win	(Thailand) Panomrunglek Chor.Sawat		Bangkok, Thailand	Decision	5	3:00
1991-04-13	Win	(Thailand) Boonchai Tor.Thuwanon	Lumpinee Stadium	Bangkok, Thailand	Decision	5	3:00
1991-02-05	Win	(Thailand) Nongmoon Chomphutong	Lumpinee Stadium	Bangkok, Thailand	Decision	5	3:00
1990-09-08	Loss	(Thailand) Boonchai Tor.Tuwanon	Lumpinee Stadium	Bangkok, Thailand	Decision	5	3:00
1990-07-13		(Thailand) Roj Lukrangsee	Lumpinee Stadium	Bangkok, Thailand			
1990-06-05	Win	(Thailand) Prasert Kittikasem	Lumpinee Stadium	Bangkok, Thailand	Decision	5	3:00
1990-02-06	Loss	(Thailand) Superlek Sornisaan	Lumpinee Stadium	Bangkok, Thailand	Decision	5	3:00
1989-12-18	Win	(Thailand) Panomrunglek Chor.Sawat	Lumpinee Stadium	Bangkok, Thailand	Decision	5	3:00
1989-09-08	Loss	(Thailand) Namphon Nongkee Pahuyuth	Lumpinee Stadium	Bangkok, Thailand	Decision	5	3:00
1989-08-15	Win	(Thailand) Sanphet Lukrangsee	Lumpinee Stadium	Bangkok, Thailand	Decision	5	3:00
1989-06-26	Win	(Thailand) Sanphet Lukrangsee	Rajadamnern Stadium	Bangkok, Thailand	Decision	5	3:00
1989-05-30	Loss	(Thailand) Cherry Sor Wanich	Lumpinee Stadium	Bangkok, Thailand	Decision	5	3:00
1989-04-29	Win	(Netherlands) Gilbert Ballantine	Championnat du Monde Boxe Thai	Paris, France	Decision	5	3:00
Wins the WMTA World Super Featherweight (130 lbs) title.
1989-04-01	Loss	(Thailand) Sanphet Lukrangsee		Pattaya, Thailand	Decision	5	3:00
1989-03-06	Loss	(Thailand) Manasak Sor Ploenchit	Lumpinee Stadium	Bangkok, Thailand	Decision	5	3:00
1989-01-31	Win	(Thailand) Petchdam Lukborai	Lumpinee Stadium	Bangkok, Thailand	Decision	5	3:00
1988-11-30	Loss	(Thailand) Tuanthong Lukdeja	Rajadamnern Stadium	Bangkok, Thailand	Decision	5	3:00
1988-07-26	Loss	(Thailand) Prasert Kittikasem	Lumpinee Stadium	Bangkok, Thailand	Decision	5	3:00
For the vacant Lumpinee Stadium Super Featherweight (130 lbs) title.
1988-06-24	Loss	(Thailand) Prasert Kittikasem	Lumpinee Stadium	Bangkok, Thailand	Decision	5	3:00
1988-04-29	Loss	(Thailand) Samransak Muangsurin	Lumpinee Stadium	Bangkok, Thailand	Decision	5	3:00
Loses the Lumpinee Stadium Featherweight (126 lbs) title.
1988-03-04	Win	(Thailand) Manasak Sor Ploenchit	Lumpinee Stadium	Bangkok, Thailand	Decision	5	3:00
1988-01-26	Win	(Thailand) Saencherng Pinsinchai	Lumpinee Stadium	Bangkok, Thailand	Decision	5	3:00
Defends the Lumpinee Stadium Featherweight (126 lbs) title.
1987-12-29	Win	(Thailand) Jomwo Chernyim	Lumpinee Stadium	Bangkok, Thailand	Decision	5	3:00
Defends the Lumpinee Stadium Featherweight (126 lbs) title.
1987-11-27	Draw	(Thailand) Saencherng Pinsinchai	Lumpinee Stadium	Bangkok, Thailand	Decision	5	3:00
1987-10-29	Loss	(Thailand) Sangtiennoi Sor.Rungroj	Rajadamnern Stadium	Bangkok, Thailand	Decision	5	3:00
1987-09-22	Draw	(Thailand) Manasak Sor Ploenchit	Lumpinee Stadium	Bangkok, Thailand	Decision	5	3:00
1987-07-31	Win	(Thailand) Yoknoi Fairtex	Lumpinee Stadium	Bangkok, Thailand	Decision	5	3:00
Wins the Lumpinee Stadium Featherweight (126 lbs) title.
1987-05-19	Loss	(Thailand) Chamuekpet Hapalang	Lumpinee Stadium	Bangkok, Thailand	Decision	5	3:00
1987-03-06	Win	(Thailand) Jomwo Chernyim	Lumpinee Stadium	Bangkok, Thailand	Decision	5	3:00
1987-02-06	Win	(Thailand) Bandon Sitbangprachan	Lumpinee Stadium	Bangkok, Thailand	Decision	5	3:00
1986-12-19	Win	(Thailand) Wanlop Sitnoknit	Huamark Stadium	Bangkok, Thailand	Decision	5	3:00
Defends the Lumpinee Bantamweight (118 lbs) title.
1986-10-14	Loss	(Thailand) Palannoi Kiatanan	Lumpinee Stadium	Bangkok, Thailand	Decision	5	3:00
1986-09-09	Loss	(Thailand) Saencherng Naruepai	Lumpinee Stadium	Bangkok, Thailand	Decision	5	3:00
1986-07-18	Win	(Thailand) Phanrit Luksrirat	Lumpinee Stadium	Bangkok, Thailand	Decision	5	3:00
Wins the vacant Lumpinee Stadium Bantamweight (118 lbs) title.
1986-06-21	Win	(Thailand) Sriracha Sakphannee		Pak Chong District, Thailand	Decision	5	3:00
1986-05-29	Loss	(Thailand) Yoknoi Fairtex	Lumpinee Stadium	Bangkok, Thailand	KO (Punches)	4	
1986-03-27	Loss	(Thailand) Samransak Muangsurin	Lumpinee Stadium	Bangkok, Thailand	Decision	5	3:00
1986-03-04	Win	(Thailand) Sanit Wichitkriengkrai	Huamark Stadium	Bangkok, Thailand	Decision	5	3:00
1986-01-18	Loss	(Thailand) Sanit Wichitkriengkrai	Lumpinee Stadium	Bangkok, Thailand	Decision	5	3:00
Loses the Lumpinee Stadium Bantamweight (118 lbs) title.
1985-12-06	Win	(Thailand) Jongrak Lukprabaht	Lumpinee Stadium	Bangkok, Thailand	Decision	5	3:00
1985-11-05	Win	(Thailand) Wisanupon Saksamut	Lumpinee Stadium	Bangkok, Thailand	Decision	5	3:00
1985-10-11	Win	(Thailand) Sanit Wichitkriengkrai	Lumpinee Stadium	Bangkok, Thailand	Decision	5	3:00
Defends the Lumpinee Stadium Bantamweight (118 lbs) title.
1985-09-03	Win	(Thailand) Petchdam Lukborai	Lumpinee Stadium	Bangkok, Thailand	Decision	5	3:00
Defends the Lumpinee Stadium Bantamweight (118 lbs) title.
1985-07-26	Loss	(Thailand) Samransak Muangsurin	Lumpinee Stadium	Bangkok, Thailand	KO	1	
1985-06-22	Win	(Thailand) Maewnoi Sitchang	National Stadium	Bangkok, Thailand	Decision	5	3:00
1985-06-04	Win	(Thailand) Maewnoi Sitchang	Lumpinee Stadium	Bangkok, Thailand	Decision	5	3:00
Wins the Lumpinee Stadium Bantamweight (118 lbs) title.
1985-04-30	NC	(Thailand) Bangkhlanoi Sor.Thanikul	Lumpinee Stadium	Bangkok, Thailand	Bangkhlanoi dismissed	5	
1985-03-29	Win	(Thailand) Phayanoi Sor.Thasanee	Lumpinee Stadium	Bangkok, Thailand	Decision	5	3:00
1985-02-08	Win	(Thailand) Tuanthong Lukdeja	Lumpinee Stadium	Bangkok, Thailand	Decision	5	3:00
1984-12-18	Win	(Thailand) Kanongsuk Sitomnoi	Lumpinee Stadium	Bangkok, Thailand	Decision	5	3:00
1984-11-20	Loss	(Thailand) Chamuekpet Hapalang	Lumpinee Stadium	Bangkok, Thailand	Decision	5	3:00
1984-10-30	Draw	(Thailand) Wisanupon Saksamut	Lumpinee Stadium	Bangkok, Thailand	Decision	5	3:00
1984-09-14	Loss	(Thailand) Chamuekpet Hapalang	Lumpinee Stadium	Bangkok, Thailand	Decision	5	3:00
1984-07-31	Win	(Thailand) Rungsaknoi Por.Ped Sitsaphan	Lumpinee Stadium	Bangkok, Thailand	Decision	5	3:00
1984-06-29	Win	(Thailand) Sangwannoi Sitsaphan	Lumpinee Stadium	Bangkok, Thailand	Decision	5	3:00
1984-06-12	Win	(Thailand) Sakkasemnoi Fairtex	Lumpinee Stadium	Bangkok, Thailand	Decision	5	3:00
1984-05-25	Win	(Thailand) Wanlopnoi Nauamthong	Lumpinee Stadium	Bangkok, Thailand	Decision	5	3:00
1984-04-24	Loss	(Thailand) Paruhatlek Sitchunthong	Lumpinee Stadium	Bangkok, Thailand	Decision	5	3:00
1984-03-30	Draw	(Thailand) Paruhatlek Sitchunthong	Lumpinee Stadium	Bangkok, Thailand	Decision	5	3:00
For the Lumpinee Stadium Light Flyweight (108lbs) title.
1984-02-28	Win	(Thailand) Baeber Lookchaomaechamadewi	Lumpinee Stadium	Bangkok, Thailand	Decision	5	3:00
1984-01-	Win	(Thailand) Daengnoi Lukprabat		Saraburi, Thailand	Decision	5	3:00
1983-12-27	Draw	(Thailand) Phongdet Chomphuthong	Lumpinee Stadium	Bangkok, Thailand	Decision	5	3:00
1983-11-10	Win	(Thailand) Pigmy Lukphrabat	Adisorn Arena	Saraburi, Thailand	Decision	5	3:00
1983-	Win	(Thailand) Supernoi Sitchokchai		Thailand	TKO	5	
1983-09-15	Loss	(Thailand) Jongrak Lukprabaht		Saraburi province, Thailand	Decision	5	3:00
1983-	Win	(Thailand) Fahlan Lukprabat	Lumpinee Stadium	Bangkok, Thailand	Decision	5	3:00
1983-	Win	(Thailand) Fahlan Lukprabat	Lumpinee Stadium	Bangkok, Thailand	Decision	5	3:00
1983-	Win	(Thailand) Lukkrok Kiaturai	Lumpinee Stadium	Bangkok, Thailand	Decision	5	3:00
1983-05-25	Loss	(Thailand) Banchanoi WichannoiStore	Rajadamnern Stadium	Thailand	Decision	5	3:00
1983-	Win	(Thailand) Pungluang Sit Sor.Wor.Por		Thailand	Decision	5	3:00
1983-	Loss	(Thailand) Thuanthong Lukdeja		Thailand	Decision	5	3:00
1983-	Win	(Thailand) Samran Lukrangsi		Thailand	Decision	5	3:00
1982-	Loss	(Thailand) Phothong Sripornsawan		Thailand	Decision	5	3:00
1982-	Loss	(Thailand) Panomtuanlek Hapalang		Thailand	Decision	5	3:00
1982-	Win	(Thailand) Phothong Sripornsawan		Thailand	Decision	5	3:00
1982-04-11	Loss	(Thailand) Komet Sakniran	Rajadamnern Stadium	Bangkok, Thailand	Decision	5	3:00
Bangkok debut
Legend: Win Loss Draw/No contest Notes
