= Manasak Sor.Ploenchit =

Thai professional Muay Thai fighter (1965-2023)

- Born: Mana Sornjam; December 7, 1965; Rayong, Thailand
- Died: September 11, 2023 (aged 57)
- Native name: มานะ สอนแจ่ม
- Other names: Manasak Chor.Rojanachai (มานะศักดิ์ ช.โรจนชัย)
- Nickname: King of Muay Thai (ราชันย์มวยไทย)
- Height: 170 cm (5 ft 7 in)
- Division: Bantamweight; Super Bantamweight; Featherweight
- Style: Muay Thai (Muay Femur)
- Stance: Orthodox
- Team: Sor.Ploenchit Gym

Mana Sornjam (Thai: มานะ สอนแจ่ม; born December 7, 1965), known professionally as Manasak Sor.Ploenchit (Thai: มานะศักดิ์ ส.เพลินจิต), was a Thai professional Muay Thai fighter. He was a two-weight Rajadamnern Stadium champion who was famous during the 1980s and 1990s.

== Biography and career ==
Manasak was born in the Rayong Province where he started Muay Thai during the mid 1970s. He rapidly reached the Bangkok circuit where he had a few fights under the name Manasak Asawamongkol, he then went back to fight in eastern Thailand where he became regional champion. Manasak then joined the Sor Ploenchit camp in Bangkok under the teaching of Sathien Sathiensut and became a successful fighter.

During his prime in the 1980s Manasak was known as a highly skilled fighter with a complete arsenal and one of the sharpest eye in the ring. He beat many notable fighters of his era such as Kongtoranee Payakaroon, Saencherng Pinsinchai, Sangtiennoi Sor.Rungroj, Panomtuanlek Hapalang, Jaroenthong Kiatbanchong or Chanchai Sor Tamarangsri.

At his peak Manasak received fight purse as high as 120,000 baht. He shortly retired in early 1986 and came back later that year.

As of 1987 Manasak was a two time Rajadamnern Stadium champion and won the Thailand King's belt.

After his fighting career Manasak went back to his hometown where he owned a shop with his family.

== Titles & honours ==
- Rajadamnern Stadium
  - 1983 Rajadamnern Stadium Bantamweight (118 lbs) Champion
  - 1987 Rajadamnern Stadium Super Bantamweight (122 lbs) Champion
- Professional Boxing Association of Thailand (PAT)
  - 1987 Thailand Super Bantamweight (122 lbs) Champion

Awards

- 1987 Sport Writers Association Fight of the Year (vs. Saencherng Naruepai)

== Fight record ==
Muay Thai Record (Incomplete)
Date	Result	Opponent	Event	Location	Method	Round	Time
1991-07-24	Loss	(Thailand) Nuengsiam Kiatwichian	Rajadamnern Stadium	Bangkok, Thailand	KO	4	
1991-06-05	Draw	(Thailand) Nuengsiam Kiatwichian	Rajadamnern Stadium	Bangkok, Thailand	Decision	5	3:00
1991-	Loss	(Thailand) Jack Kiatniwat	Rajadamnern Stadium	Bangkok, Thailand	Decision	5	3:00
1991-	Loss	(Thailand) Jack Kiatniwat	Rajadamnern Stadium	Bangkok, Thailand	Decision	5	3:00
1991-02-20	Loss	(Thailand) Taweechai Wor.Preecha	Rajadamnern Stadium	Bangkok, Thailand	Decision	5	3:00
1990-11-23	Win	(Japan) Kyoji Saito	AJKF "INSPIRING WARS 3rd"	Tokyo, Japan	TKO	5	2:23
1990-11-08	Loss	(Thailand) Nuengsiam Kiatwichian	Rajadamnern Stadium	Bangkok, Thailand	TKO (Doctor Stoppage)	4	
1990-09-29	Loss	(Thailand) Chanalert Muanghatyai	Rajadamnern Stadium	Bangkok, Thailand	Decision	5	3:00
1990-07-05	Loss	(Thailand) Chanalert Muanghatyai	Rajadamnern Stadium	Bangkok, Thailand	TKO (Doctor stoppage)	3	
1990-03-21	Draw	(Thailand) Poonsawat Wor.Singsanae	Rajadamnern Stadium	Bangkok, Thailand	Decision	5	3:00
1990-03-01	Win	(Thailand) Sombat Sor.Thanikul	Rajadamnern Stadium	Bangkok, Thailand	Decision	5	3:00
1990-01-29	Draw	(Thailand) Sombat Sor.Thanikul	Rajadamnern Stadium	Bangkok, Thailand	Decision	5	3:00
1989-09-27	Loss	(Thailand) Jack Kiatniwat	Rajadamnern Stadium	Bangkok, Thailand	Decision	5	3:00
1989-08-15	Loss	(Thailand) Namphon Nongkee Pahuyuth	Lumpinee Stadium	Bangkok, Thailand	Decision	5	3:00
1989-07-09	Loss	(Thailand) Sangtiennoi Sor.Rungroj	Rajadamnern Stadium	Bangkok, Thailand	Decision	5	3:00
1989-06-03	Win	(Thailand) Jaroenthong Kiatbanchong		Trang, Thailand	TKO	3	
1989-05-02	Loss	(Thailand) Saencherng Narupai	Lumpinee Stadium	Bangkok, Thailand	Decision	5	3:00
1989-04-07	Win	(Thailand) Petchdam Lukborai	Lumpinee Stadium	Bangkok, Thailand	Decision	5	3:00
1989-03-06	Win	(Thailand) Chanchai Sor.Tamarangsri	Lumpinee Stadium	Bangkok, Thailand	Decision	5	3:00
1988-12-07	NC	(Thailand) Sanit Wichitkriangkrai	Rajadamnern Stadium	Bangkok, Thailand	Ref.stop (Sanit dismissed)	4	
1988-09-07	Win	(Thailand) Tuanthong Lukdecha	Rajadamnern Stadium	Bangkok, Thailand	Decision	5	3:00
1988-06-24	Loss	(Thailand) Namphon Nongkeepahuyuth	Lumpinee Stadium	Bangkok, Thailand	Decision	5	3:00
1988-04-08	Loss	(Thailand) Jomwo Chernyim	Lumpinee Stadium	Bangkok, Thailand	KO	3	
1988-03-04	Loss	(Thailand) Chanchai Sor.Tamarangsri	Lumpinee Stadium	Bangkok, Thailand	Decision	5	3:00
1987-11-27	Loss	(Thailand) Panomtuanlek Hapalang	Lumpinee Stadium	Bangkok, Thailand	Decision	5	3:00
For the Lumpinee Stadium Super Bantamweight (122 lbs) title.
1987-10-27	Loss	(Thailand) Chamuekpet Hapalang	Rajadamnern Stadium	Bangkok, Thailand	Decision	5	3:00
1987-09-22	Draw	(Thailand) Chanchai Sor Tamarangsri	Lumpinee Stadium	Bangkok, Thailand	Decision	5	3:00
1987-07-31	Win	(Thailand) Panomtuanlek Hapalang	Lumpinee Stadium	Bangkok, Thailand	KO (Punches)	1	
1987-06-19	Win	(Thailand) Saencherng Narupai	Lumpinee Stadium	Bangkok, Thailand	TKO (Doctor stoppage)	2	
Wins the Thailand Super Bantamweight (122 lbs) title.
1987-05-31	Win	(Thailand) Saphaphet Kiatphetnoi	Rajadamnern Stadium	Bangkok, Thailand	Decision	5	3:00
Wins the Rajadamnern Stadium Super Bantamweight (122 lbs) title.
1987-03-23	Win	(Thailand) Sombat Sor.Thanikul	Rajadamnern Stadium	Bangkok, Thailand	Decision	5	3:00
1987-02-26	Win	(Thailand) Sangtiennoi Sor.Rungroj	Rajadamnern Stadium	Bangkok, Thailand	Decision	5	3:00
1986-12-22	Win	(Thailand) Kingsaknoi Saknarin		Bangkok, Thailand	Decision	5	3:00
1986-11-11	Loss	(Thailand) Jomwo Chernyim	Lumpinee Stadium	Bangkok, Thailand	KO (Punches)	3	
1986-04-03	Loss	(Thailand) Jomwo Chernyim	Lumpinee Stadium	Bangkok, Thailand	Decision	5	3:00
1986-02-10	Win	(Thailand) Sangtiennoi Sor.Rungroj	Rajadamnern Stadium	Bangkok, Thailand	Decision	5	3:00
1985-11-22	Loss	(Thailand) Jomwo Chernyim	Rajadamnern Stadium	Bangkok, Thailand	Decision	5	3:00
1985-10-24	Loss	(Thailand) Chamuekpet Hapalang	Lumpinee Stadium	Bangkok, Thailand	Decision	5	3:00
1985-09-23	Win	(Thailand) Jampatong Na Nontachai	Rajadamnern Stadium	Bangkok, Thailand	Decision	5	3:00
1985-09-02	Win	(Thailand) Jomwo Chernyim	Rajadamnern Stadium	Bangkok, Thailand	Decision	5	3:00
1985-07-17	Win	(Thailand) Saencherng Narupai	Rajadamnern Stadium	Bangkok, Thailand	Decision	5	3:00
1985-04-02	Win	(Thailand) Pornsaknoi Sitchang	Lumpinee Stadium	Bangkok, Thailand	Decision	5	3:00
1985-01-08	Win	(Thailand) Bangkhlanoi Sor.Thanikul	Lumpinee Stadium	Bangkok, Thailand	Decision	5	3:00
1984-11-21	Loss	(Thailand) Nikhom Phetphothong	Rajadamnern Stadium	Bangkok, Thailand	Decision	5	3:00
For the vacant Rajadamnern Stadium Bantamweight (118 lbs) title.
1984-06-29	Loss	(Thailand) Samransak Muangsurin	Lumpinee Stadium	Bangkok, Thailand	KO	3	
1984-05-10	Draw	(Thailand) Panmongkhol Hor.Mahachai	Rajadamnern Stadium	Bangkok, Thailand	Decision	5	3:00
1984-04-10	Win	(Thailand) Kongtoranee Payakaroon	Lumpinee Stadium	Bangkok, Thailand	Decision	5	3:00
1984-01-27	Win	(Thailand) Panmongkhol Hor.Mahachai		Bangkok, Thailand	Decision	5	3:00
1983-12-28	Win	(Thailand) Nikhom Phetphothong	Rajadamnern Stadium	Bangkok, Thailand	KO	3	
Wins the Rajadamnern Stadium Bantamweight (118 lbs) title.
1983-11-11	Win	(Thailand) Palannoi Kiatanan		Bangkok, Thailand	Decision	5	3:00
1983-08-26	Loss	(Thailand) Jakrawan Kiatsakthewan	Lumpinee Stadium	Bangkok, Thailand	Referee Stoppage	4	
1983-06-15	Win	(Thailand) Sakchai Singkhiri	Rajadamnern Stadium	Bangkok, Thailand	Decision	5	3:00
1983-05-25	Win	(Thailand) Piyarat Sor.Narongmit		Bangkok, Thailand	Referee Stoppage	3	
1983-04-05	Loss	(Thailand) Palannoi Kiatanan		Bangkok, Thailand	Decision	5	3:00
1983-03-04	Loss	(Thailand) Jakrawan Kiatsakthewan	Lumpinee Stadium	Bangkok, Thailand	Decision	5	3:00
1983-01-07	Win	(Thailand) Roengnarong Thairungrueng	Lumpinee Stadium	Bangkok, Thailand	Decision	5	3:00
1982-12-07	NC	(Thailand) Fonluang Luksadetmaephuangthong		Bangkok, Thailand	Fonluang dismissed	5	
1982-11-02	Win	(Thailand) Wanmai Phetbundit		Bangkok, Thailand	KO	5	
1982-09-07	Win	(Thailand) Falikhit Sitmanathep	Lumpinee Stadium	Bangkok, Thailand	KO	4	
1982-07-09	Loss	(Thailand) Sornsilp Sitnoenpayom	Lumpinee Stadium	Bangkok, Thailand	Decision	5	3:00
1982-06-10	Win	(Thailand) Chamnansuk Na Pattaya		Pattaya, Thailand	Decision	5	3:00
1982-05-19	Loss	(Thailand) Wanmai Phetbundit	Rajadamnern Stadium	Bangkok, Thailand	Decision	5	3:00
1982-04-07	Win	(Thailand) Arthit Somsakanping		Bangkok, Thailand	Decision	5	3:00
1982-02-12	Win	(Thailand) Pungthong Fairtex		Bangkok, Thailand	KO	3	
1981-12-27	Win	(Thailand) Narak Sitkuanyim		Bangkok, Thailand	Decision	5	3:00
1981-11-23	Win	(Thailand) Ruengchai Thairungruang		Bangkok, Thailand	Decision	5	3:00
1981-11-03	Win	(Thailand) Ekkarat Sakcharoen		Bangkok, Thailand	KO	3	
1981-08-24	Loss	(Thailand) Chokdee Kiatpayathai		Bangkok, Thailand	Decision	5	3:00
1980-	Win	(Thailand) Dang Krutawut		Thailand	Decision	5	3:00
1980-	Win	(Thailand) Saengphet Lukwatphailom		Thailand	Decision	5	3:00
Wins the Thailand East region Flyweight (112 lbs) title.
1980-	Win	(Thailand) Theerasongwan Chomphutong		Thailand	Decision	5	3:00
1980-	Win	(Thailand) Siasanao Phibanyathi		Thailand	Decision	5	3:00
Wins the Thailand East region Light Flyweight (108 lbs) title.
1980-04-01	Win	(Thailand) Rungrojnoi Sor.Sitsananda		Bangkok, Thailand	Decision	5	3:00
1980-02-05	Loss	(Thailand) Yodchat Deeprasert		Bangkok, Thailand	Decision	5	3:00
1979-12-07	Win	(Thailand) Surasak Khomkreemak		Bangkok, Thailand	Decision	5	3:00
1979-10-23	Win	(Thailand) Phanomnoi Lukprabat		Bangkok, Thailand	Decision	5	3:00
Legend: Win Loss Draw/No contest Notes
