= Therdkiat Sitthepitak =

Thai former professional Muay Thai fighter

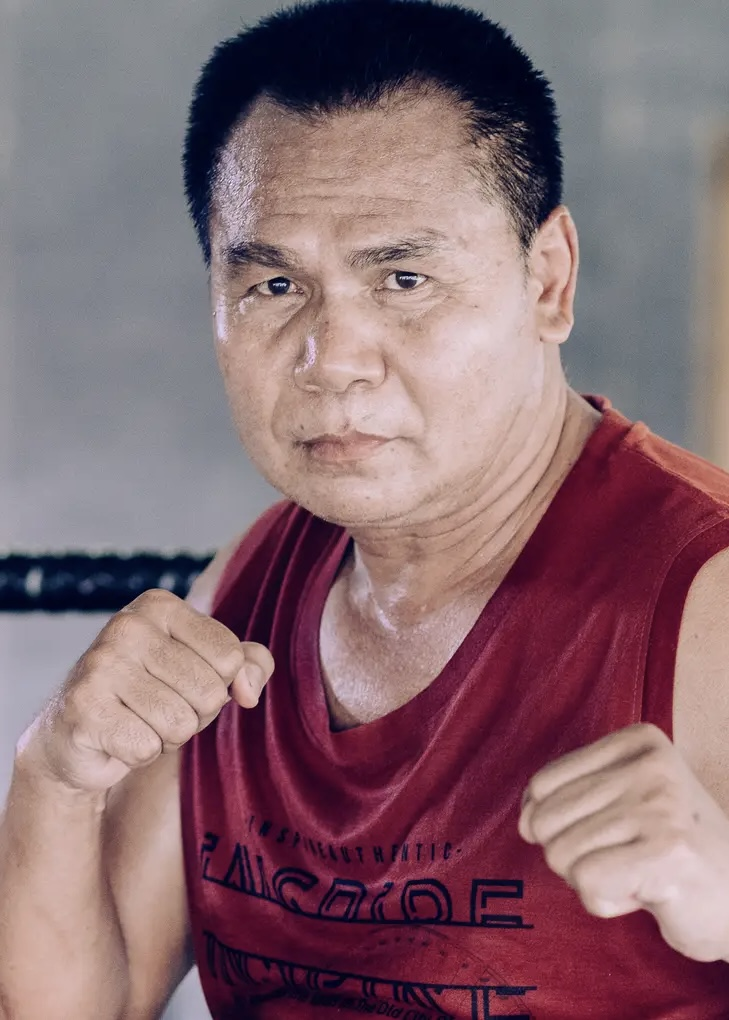
- Therdkiat in 2024
- Born: Somkid Kruewan; August 29, 1970 (age 56); Satuek, Buriram, Thailand
- Native name: สมคิด เครือวัลย์
- Other names: Kiatnarong Luksakaew; Therdkiat Sitphonphitak; Therdkiat Kiatrungroj (เทอดเกียรติ เกียรติรุ่งโรจน์)
- Nickname: The King of Lumpinee (ราชันแห่งลุมพินี); The King of Kathina (จอมกฐิน); Disc Brake Kicker (จอมเตะดิสก์เบรก); The Acacia (จอมกระถิน)
- Height: 170 cm (5 ft 7 in)
- Division: Super Bantamweight; Featherweight; Super Featherweight; Lightweight; Super Lightweight
- Style: Muay Thai (Muay Femur)
- Stance: Orthodox
- Team: Unaffiliated (1980s-1992); Nongkeepahuyuth (1992-1997)
- Trainer: Plian Kruewan (father); Pramot Hoymook (Nongkeepahuyuth gym)
- Years active: 1984-2001; 2003

Kickboxing record
- Total: 140
- Wins: 107
- Losses: 30
- Draws: 3

Other information
- Spouse: Jintana Kruewan
- Children: Nongcheer Sitthepitak (daughter); 1 son
- Notable relatives: Wuttichai Sitthepitak (older brother); Noomchingchai Sitthepitak (older brother); Therdkiatlek Sitthepitak (younger brother)

Somkid Kruewan (Thai: สมคิด เครือวัลย์; born August 29, 1970), known professionally as Therdkiat Sitthepitak (Thai: เทอดเกียรติ ศิษย์เทพพิทักษ์), is a Thai former professional Muay Thai fighter. He is a former four-time Lumpinee Stadium champion across two divisions who was famous in the 1980s and 1990s. He was known to be an "aggressive Muay Femur".

== Biography and career ==
=== Early life ===
Kruewan was born in the Satuek district in Buriram province on August 29, 1970. His father, a former Muay Thai fighter, initiated him and all 3 of his brothers to Muay Thai. Under the ring name Kiatnarong Luksakaew, he had his first Muay Thai fight at 14-years-old where he won by a 2nd round knockout. Once he became a well-known fighter in Surin province, he changed his ring name to Therdkiat Sitphonphitak and started taking matchups in Buriram province for several years. Therdkiat lost for the first time after facing Kaewsawan Sitsathasan, by that point he had a record of around 25 fights with no losses. In mid 1986, he was scouted by Songchai Rattanasuban, the owner of the Onesongchai promotion. Around this time, Therdkiat was training Muay Thai by himself since he could not find training partners in his hometown, so Rattanasuban would send him Bangkok so that he could briefly train at various Muay Thai gyms before fights. Rattanasuban then gave him the ring name of Therdkiat Sitthepitak.

=== Fighting in Bangkok ===
Rattanasuban set him up to begin fighting in Lumpinee Stadium from mid 1986 and onward. He won his first 3 Lumpinee fights. In 1987, he won the junior flyweight championship awarded by the Northeastern Professional Boxing Council of Thailand after beating "The Elbow Hunter of 100 Stitches" Yodkhunpon Sittraiphum in Roi Et province. At this time, his two older brothers, Wuttichai and Noomchingchai, as well as his father, Plian Kruewan, were his trainers at home. 1989 was a significant year in Therdkiat's career as he would beat Samransak Muangsurin, Superlek Sorn E-Sarn, Kawnar Sor.Khetallingchan, among other yodmuay (elite fighters). Therdkiat won the Lumpinee Junior Featherweight title that year and later the Lumpinee Featherweight title in 1990.

After losing to Jongsanan Fairtex in August 1992, the Onesongchai promotion had Therdkiat be recruited by the Nongkeepahuyuth gym in Bangkok due to his inconsistent performances since 1990. There, Therdkiat began training under Pramot Hoymook and became teammates with former opponents Namphon and Namkabuan Nongkeepahuyuth. Afterwards, Therdkiat held a 5-win streak against 4 fighters who resided at the top of the featherweight division in October 1992 to March 1993, during which he knocked out Jongsanan with a head kick. In his first match against Oley Kiatoneway, Therdkiat was knocked down 3 times by punches in the first round, resulting in a TKO loss. They rematched 2 months later for the Lumpinee featherweight title where he was able to outscore Oley and win the belt for the 3rd time.

He would be nicknamed "The King of Lumpinee," "The King of Kathina," and "The Disc Brake Kicker," the last alias being a reference to his ability to make opponents stop in place with his teep kicks. He was also named Jom Krathin ("The Acacia") since he preferred to eat Acacia leaves after training sessions in his hometown. In his first few Bangkok fights, Therdkiat would become exhausted in the later rounds, so a journalist joked that it was because he only ate Acacia leaves. He was noted for being an aggressive Muay Femur stylist (rope-a-dope fighter in Muay Thai) similar to his teammate Namkabuan. Therdkiat was noted to have unusually aggressive counters for a Muay Femur fighter.

After losing the Lumpinee Featherweight title to Mathee Jadeepitak in 1994, Therdkiat began performing worse in the following years of his career. Despite this, he was still able to win against Orono Por.Muangubon, Pairot Wor.Walapon (KO), Rainbow Sor.Prantalay, Samkor Kiatmontep, etc. He fought infrequently until he retired in 2003. In the final years of his Muay Thai career, he went by the ring name of Therdkiat Kiatrungroj. He stayed with the Nongkeepahuyuth gym until the end of his fighting career. His Muay Thai record consists of 107 wins, 30 losses and 3 draws.

=== Personal life after Muay Thai career ===
His family consists of his wife Jintana Kruewan, their son, and their daughter Nongcheer. Nongcheer is also a Muay Thai fighter who has had around 20 fights as of August 2022. She also competed in a boxing match held by the Team Ellis promotion in Australia. She goes by the ring name of Nongcheer Sitthepitak.

== Titles and accomplishments ==
- Northeastern Professional Boxing Council
  - 1987 NPBC Flyweight (112 lbs) Champion
- Lumpinee Stadium
  - 1989 Lumpinee Stadium Super Bantamweight (122 lbs) Champion
    - One successful title defense
  - 1990 Lumpinee Stadium Featherweight (126 lbs) Champion
  - 1991 Lumpinee Stadium Featherweight (126 lbs) Champion
  - 1993 Lumpinee Stadium Featherweight (126 lbs) Champion
- International Muay Thai Council
  - 1997 IMTC World Super Lightweight (140 lbs) Champion

== Fight record ==
Muay Thai Record (Incomplete)
107 wins, 30 Losses, 3 Draws
Date	Result	Opponent	Event	Location	Method	Round	Time
	Loss	(Australia) Brad Wright		Perth, Australia	KO (Knee to the body)		
2003-12-05	Win	(Canada) Alex Ricci	King's Birthday Event	Sanam Luang, Thailand	Decision	5	3:00
2001-09-29	Win	(Thailand) Kanongsaklek K.T.Gym		Bangkok, Thailand	Decision	5	3:00
2000-09-09	Loss	(Thailand) Attachai Por.Samranchai	Lumpinee Stadium	Bangkok, Thailand	Decision	5	3:00
1999-03-26	Loss	(Thailand) Attachai Por.Yosanan	Lumpinee Stadium	Bangkok, Thailand	Decision	5	3:00
For a 1 million baht side-bet.
1999-02-10	Loss	(Thailand) Kaolan Kaovichit	Rajadamnern Stadium	Bangkok, Thailand	Decision	5	3:00
1999-01-02	Loss	(Thailand) Orono Por Muang Ubon	Lumpinee Stadium	Bangkok, Thailand	Decision	5	3:00
199?-09-30	Loss	(Thailand) Khunsuk Sunwelarewadee		Bangkok, Thailand	Decision	5	3:00
1997-10-05	Loss	(France) Morad Sari		Paris, France	TKO (Punches)	3	
1997-06-01	Win	(Thailand) Kaoponglek Luksuratham	Paet Riew International Stadium	Chachoengsao, Thailand	Decision	5	3:00
Wins the vacant IMTC Super Lightweight (140 lbs) title.
1996-	Win	(Thailand) Orono Por.MuangUbon	Lumpinee Stadium	Bangkok, Thailand	Decision	5	3:00
1996-07-20	Win	(Thailand) Pairot Wor.Walapon		Buriram, Thailand	KO (Right Cross)	3	
1996-05-21	Loss	(Thailand) Kaoponglek Luksuratham	Lumpinee Stadium	Bangkok, Thailand	KO (Elbow)	4	
1996-03-05	Win	(Thailand) Samkor Kiatmontep	Lumpinee Stadium	Bangkok, Thailand	Decision	5	3:00
1996-01-19	Win	(Thailand) Rainbow Sor.Prantalay	Lumpinee Stadium	Bangkok, Thailand	Decision	5	3:00
1995-	Loss	(Thailand) Chatchai Paiseetong	Rajadamnern Stadium	Bangkok, Thailand	Decision	5	3:00
1995-02-28	NC	(Thailand) Pairot Wor.Wolapon	Onesongchai, Lumpinee Stadium	Bangkok, Thailand	Ref.stop. (Therdkiat dismissed)	4	
1995-01-31	Win	(Thailand) Orono Por.MuangUbon	Lumpinee Stadium	Bangkok, Thailand	Decision	5	3:00
1994-11-29	Draw	(Thailand) Chatchai Paiseetong	Lumpinee Stadium	Bangkok, Thailand	Decision	5	3:00
1994-07-29	Loss	(Thailand) Mathee Jadeepitak	Lumpinee Stadium	Bangkok, Thailand	TKO (Doctor Stoppage)	4	
Loses the Lumpinee Stadium Featherweight (126 lbs) title.
1994-06-20	Loss	(Thailand) Chatchai Paiseetong	Lumpinee Stadium	Bangkok, Thailand	Decision	5	3:00
1994-04-02	Win	(Thailand) Jongsanan Fairtex	Lumpinee Stadium	Bangkok, Thailand	Decision	5	3:00
1994-01-24	Win	(Thailand) Jongsanan Fairtex	Rajadamnern Stadium	Bangkok, Thailand	Decision	5	3:00
1993-11-29	Win	(Thailand) Robert Kaennorasing	Rajadamnern Stadium	Bangkok, Thailand	Decision	5	3:00
1993-10-05	Win	(Thailand) Oley Kiatoneway	Lumpinee Stadium	Bangkok, Thailand	Decision (Majority)	5	3:00
Wins the vacant Lumpinee Stadium Featherweight (126 lbs) title.
1993-08-06	Loss	(Thailand) Oley Kiatoneway	Lumpinee Stadium	Bangkok, Thailand	TKO (3 knockdowns)	1	
1993-07-11	Loss	(Thailand) Jongsanan Fairtex		Nakhon Sawan, Thailand	Decision	5	3:00
1993-03-23	Win	(Thailand) Chandet Sor.Prantalay	Lumpinee Stadium	Bangkok, Thailand	Decision	5	3:00
1993-02-26	Win	(Thailand) Robert Kaennorasing	Lumpinee Stadium	Bangkok, Thailand	Decision	5	3:00
1993-01-29	Win	(Thailand) Jongsanan Fairtex	Lumpinee Stadium	Bangkok, Thailand	KO (Right high kick)	2	
1992-11-20	Win	(Thailand) Nuathoranee Thongracha	Lumpinee Stadium	Bangkok, Thailand	Decision	5	3:00
1992-10-13	Win	(Thailand) Cherry Sor.Wanich	Lumpinee Stadium	Bangkok, Thailand	Decision	5	3:00
1992-08-	Loss	(Thailand) Jongsanan Fairtex		Australia	Decision	5	3:00
1992-06-09	Loss	(Thailand) Namkabuan Nongkeepahuyuth	Lumpinee Stadium	Bangkok, Thailand	Decision	5	3:00
1992-03-20	Win	(Thailand) Sangtiennoi Sor.Rungroj	Lumpinee Stadium	Bangkok, Thailand	Decision	5	3:00
1992-02-21	Loss	(Thailand) Jongsanan Fairtex	Lumpinee Stadium	Bangkok, Thailand	Decision	5	3:00
Loses the Lumpinee Stadium Featherweight (126 lbs) title.
1991-09-27	Win	(Thailand) Sanit Wichitkriengkrai	Lumpinee Stadium	Bangkok, Thailand	Decision	5	3:00
Wins the vacant Lumpinee Stadium Featherweight (126 lbs) title.
1991-07-20	Win	(Thailand) Jack Kiatniwat	Crocodile Farm	Samut Prakan, Thailand	Decision	5	3:00
1991-06-14	Loss	(Thailand) Jaroenthong Kiatbanchong	Lumpinee Stadium	Bangkok, Thailand	Decision	5	3:00
Loses the Lumpinee Stadium Featherweight (126 lbs) title.
1991-03-01	Loss	(Thailand) Namphon Nongkeepahuyuth	Lumpinee Stadium	Bangkok, Thailand	KO	4	
1991-02-15	Win	(Thailand) Rajasak Sor.Vorapin		Phra Nakhon Si Ayutthaya, Thailand	Decision	5	3:00
1990-12-20	Loss	(Thailand) Rajasak Sor.Vorapin	Rajadamnern Stadium	Bangkok, Thailand	Decision	5	3:00
1990-11-27	Win	(Thailand) Jaroenthong Kiatbanchong	Lumpinee Stadium	Bangkok, Thailand	Decision	5	3:00
1990-10-30	Loss	(Thailand) Cherry Sor.Wanich	Lumpinee Stadium	Bangkok, Thailand	Decision	5	3:00
1990-09-28	Win	(Thailand) Panomrunglek Chor.Sawat	Lumpinee Stadium	Bangkok, Thailand	Decision	5	3:00
1990-08-31	Loss	(Thailand) Cherry Sor.Wanich	Lumpinee Stadium	Bangkok, Thailand	Decision	5	3:00
For the Lumpinee Stadium Super Featherweight (130 lbs) title.
1990-06-30	Win	(Thailand) Petchdam Lukborai	Lumpinee Stadium	Bangkok, Thailand	Decision	5	3:00
Wins the Lumpinee Stadium Featherweight (126 lbs) title.
1990-06-08	Draw	(Thailand) Grandprixnoi Muangchaiyaphum	Lumpinee Stadium	Bangkok, Thailand	Decision	5	3:00
1990-04-24	Loss	(Thailand) Jaroenthong Kiatbanchong	Lumpinee Stadium	Bangkok, Thailand	Decision	5	3:00
1990-03-30	Win	(Thailand) Panomrunglek Chor.Sawat	Lumpinee Stadium	Bangkok, Thailand	Decision	5	3:00
Defends the Lumpinee Stadium Super Bantamweight (122 lbs) title.
1990-03-	Win	(Thailand) Boonlong Sor.Thanikul	Lumpinee Stadium	Bangkok, Thailand	Decision	5	3:00
1990-02-06	Win	(Thailand) Boonlong Sor.Thanikul	Lumpinee Stadium	Bangkok, Thailand	Decision	5	3:00
1990-01-	Win	(Thailand) Rot Lukrangsee	Lumpinee Stadium	Bangkok, Thailand	Decision	5	3:00
1989-11-28	Loss	(Thailand) Panomrunglek Chor.Sawat	Lumpinee Stadium	Bangkok, Thailand	Decision	5	3:00
1989-11-07	Win	(Thailand) Superlek Sornisaan	Lumpinee Stadium	Bangkok, Thailand	Decision	5	3:00
Wins the Lumpinee Stadium Super Bantamweight (122 lbs) title.
1989-10-06	Win	(Thailand) Pon Narupai	Lumpinee Stadium	Bangkok, Thailand	Decision	5	3:00
1989-	Win	(Thailand) Kaonar Sor.Ketallingchan	Lumpinee Stadium	Bangkok, Thailand	Decision	5	3:00
1989-07-29	Win	(Thailand) Samransak Muangsurin	Sri Narong Stadium	Surin, Thailand	Decision	5	3:00
1989-06-24	Loss	(Thailand) Samransak Muangsurin	Lumpinee Stadium	Bangkok, Thailand	Decision	5	3:00
1989-04-	Win	(Thailand) Den Muangsurin	Lumpinee Stadium	Bangkok, Thailand	Decision	5	3:00
1989-03-06	Win	(Thailand) Thammawit Saksamut	Rajadamnern Stadium	Bangkok, Thailand	Decision	5	3:00
1989-02-	Win	(Thailand) Khunpon Chor.Rojanachai	Lumpinee Stadium	Bangkok, Thailand	KO	2	
1989-01-31	Win	(Thailand) Panomrunglek Chor.Sawat	Lumpinee Stadium	Bangkok, Thailand	Referee Stoppage	4	
1989-01-06	Loss	(Thailand) Den Muangsurin	Lumpinee Stadium	Bangkok, Thailand	Decision	5	3:00
1988-12-10	Win	(Thailand) Nongmoon Chomphutong		Udon Thani, Thailand	Decision	5	3:00
1988-11-25	Win	(Thailand) Ritthichai Lookchaomaesaitong	Lumpinee Stadium	Bangkok, Thailand	Decision	5	3:00
1988-11-04	Loss	(Thailand) Panomrunglek Chor.Sawat	Lumpinee Stadium	Bangkok, Thailand	Decision	5	3:00
1988-09-18	Win	(Thailand) Kingdaeng Sor.Rattana		Khon Kaen, Thailand	KO	3	
1988-07-16	Win	(Thailand) Dawuthai Chatchuphon	Lumpinee Stadium	Bangkok, Thailand	Decision	5	3:00
1988-	Win	(Thailand) Kaenphet Saksam		Thailand	KO	3	
1988-	Win	(Thailand) Samingkhao Sor.Rattana		Thailand	KO	2	
1988-	Win	(Thailand) Kongnapa Kiatmongkol		Thailand	KO	2	
1987-12-01	Win	(Thailand) Sinchai Waiwat		Roi Et, Thailand	Decision	5	3:00
1987-06-30	Win	(Thailand) Yodkhunpon Sittraiphum		Roi Et, Thailand	Decision	5	3:00
Wins the Northeastern Professional Boxing Council Flyweight (112 lbs) title.
1987-05-29	Win	(Thailand) Mingmuang Lukjaophomehasak		Roi Et, Thailand	Decision	5	3:00
1986-12-13	Win	(Thailand) Chakkrathep Luknoendindaeng	Rajadamnern Stadium	Bangkok, Thailand	KO		
1986-10-16	Win	(Thailand) Pichitchailek Sitpichitchai		Buriram, Thailand	Decision	5	3:00
1986-09-20	Loss	(Thailand) Pichitchailek Sitpichitchai		Ubon Ratchathani, Thailand	Decision	5	3:00
1986-09-16	Win	(Thailand) Rungrat Srisanchai	Lumpinee Stadium	Bangkok, Thailand	Decision	5	3:00
1986-09-03	Win	(Thailand) Sangdaonoi Suraphom		Buriram, Thailand	Decision	5	3:00
1986-08-12	Win	(Thailand) Keawsawan Sitsathasan		Buriram, Thailand	Decision	5	3:00
1986-08-01	Win	(Thailand) Khirisak Ekamit	Lumpinee Stadium	Bangkok, Thailand	KO	3	
	Win	(Thailand) Yodphet Amornrit		Buriram, Thailand	Decision	5	3:00
	Win	(Thailand) Damrongdet Lukbangbon		Buriram, Thailand	KO	4	
	Win	(Thailand) Chingchai Lukathit		Buriram, Thailand	KO	3	
	Win	(Thailand) Supernoi Kiatphattana		Buriram, Thailand	Decision	5	3:00
	Win	(Thailand) Kaikeaw Sor.Saengthorn		Buriram, Thailand	Decision	5	3:00
	Win	(Thailand) Mangkornnoi Kiatkitti		Buriram, Thailand	KO	3	
	Win	(Thailand) Damrongdet Lukbangbon		Buriram, Thailand	Decision	5	3:00
	Loss	(Thailand) Keawsawan Sitsathasan		Buriram, Thailand	Decision	5	3:00
Therdkiat's first loss in his career.
	Draw	(Thailand) Sornthep Or.Sribualoi		Buriram, Thailand	Decision	5	3:00
	Win	(Thailand) Deesam Kiatthanasarn		Buriram, Thailand	KO	4	
	Win	(Thailand) Deesam Kiatthanasarn		Buriram, Thailand	KO	4	
	Win	(Thailand) Taemdaonoi Sitchaiyot		Buriram, Thailand	Decision	5	3:00
	Win	(Thailand) Omsap Saklamchi		Buriram, Thailand	Decision	5	3:00
	Win	(Thailand) Dechanokkarian Sor.Salangthon		Buriram, Thailand	Decision	5	3:00
	Win	(Thailand) Dongbanglek Singhiran		Buriram, Thailand	KO	2	
	Win	(Thailand) Bowie Or.Yuttanakorn		Buriram, Thailand	KO	2	
	Win	(Thailand) Rabilnoi Sunkilaputtha		Buriram, Thailand	KO	3	
	Win	(Thailand) Pathomchai Kiattisiri		Buriram, Thailand	KO	2	
	Win	(Thailand) Noknoi Ekayothin		Buriram, Thailand	KO	2	
	Win	(Thailand) Klaidan Kiatsakthewan		Buriram, Thailand	Decision	5	3:00
Legend: Win Loss Draw/No contest Notes
