= Namkabuan Nongkeepahuyuth =

Thai professional Muay Thai fighter (1973–2021)

- Namkabuan in 1993
- Born: Kampiew Sijanteuk; 4 February 1973; Thung Kratat Phatthana, Nong Ki, Buriram, Thailand
- Died: 7 April 2021 (aged 48); Maharat Nakhon Ratchasima Hospital, Nakhon Ratchasima, Thailand
- Native name: นำขบวน หนองกี่พาหุยุทธ
- Nickname: The Ring Genius (???); The Plowman (จอมไถนา); Knee Striker of Phanom Rung (ขุนเข่าพนมรุ้ง); The Phanom Rung Martial Artist (Jomyuth Phanom Rung)
- Height: 1.72 m (5 ft 8 in)
- Division: Light Flyweight; Super Bantamweight; Featherweight; Super Featherweight; Lightweight
- Reach: 1.71 m (67 in)
- Style: Muay Thai (Muay Femur / Muay Khao); Muay Boran
- Stance: Orthodox
- Team: Nongkeepahuyuth
- Trainer: Pramot Hoymook; Poot Akkarat
- Years active: c. 1983–2002

Kickboxing record
- Total: 303
- Wins: 266
- Losses: 35
- Draws: 2

Other information
- Occupation: Muay Thai fighter Muay Thai trainer Restaurateur
- Spouse: Khop Hoymook
- Children: 2 daughters
- Notable relatives: Namphon Nongkeepahuyuth (older brother)

Kampiew Sijanteuk (Thai: คำเพียว สีจันทึก; 2 February 1973 – 7 April 2021), known professionally as Namkabuan Nongkeepahuyuth (Thai: นำขบวน หนองกี่พาหุยุทธ), was a Thai professional Muay Thai fighter. He was the Lumpinee Stadium Super Featherweight Champion for six years until he was stripped of the title after running out of challengers. Nicknamed "The Ring Genius", he was especially known for using a wide-variety of techniques, notably from Muay Boran, and is considered amongst the greatest fighters in the history of Muay Thai.

He was also the younger brother of Namphon Nongkeepahuyuth, another famous Thai fighter.

== Biography and career ==
=== Early life and beginning of Muay Thai career ===
Kampiew Sijantuek (nicknamed Piew) was born in the Thung Kratat Phatthana subdistrict of Nong Ki district in Buriram province on 4 February 1973. He was the youngest of his 7 siblings which included famous Muay Khao fighter (knee fighter) Namphon Nongkeepahuyuth. At first, Sijantuek would watch Namphon train at the Nongkeepahuyuth gym which was famed for producing fighters that excelled in knee striking as well as using select Muay boran techniques in real fights. He was disinterested in training Muay Thai himself after seeing Namphon's demanding Muay Khao training regimen. Namphon later pressured him to participate in a Muay Thai fight despite the fact that he did not have formal training, resulting in a draw and an 80 baht purse directly from the audience. Sijantuek was noted to not give up during fights, prompting Pramot Hoymook, the owner of the Nongkeepahuyuth camp, to give him more matchups.

Despite not wanting to fight, Sijantuek officially joined the Nongkeepahuyuth gym to train under Hoymook and Poot Akkarat as he was pressured to take on more opponents. Namphon would become a popular fighter in the Isaan region and eventually ran out of opponents, prompting him to begin fighting in Bangkok. Sijantuek was still fighting in his local area until he ran out of opponents as well. He started fighting in different regions in Thailand until he won a paperweight (95 lbs/43.09 kg) championship in Nakhon Ratchasima province.

=== Rise to fame in Bangkok ===
At 13-years-old he would start fighting in Bangkok himself but lost the first 3 fights as he was not skilled enough. Under the advice of the Onesongchai promotion, Pramot Hoymook had Namkabuan temporarily train in the Muangsurin gym for 1 week to further hone his skills for Lumpinee Stadium matchups. Namkabuan would quickly improve enough to be able to handle varying opponents and became a well-rounded fighter. In around 1988, his second year of fighting in Bangkok, Namkabuan's fight purse reached ฿100,000 (equivalent to ฿243,632 in 2020) signifying that he was a yodmuay (elite fighter). He began his rise to popularity later that year after beating Akaradej Sitkhosa for a ฿100,000 side-bet.

In 1989, once he was considered famous in the Kingdom of Thailand, Namkabuan's level of competition would continue to grow as he was matched up against Hippy Singmanee, Kraiwannoi Sit Kru Od, Karuhat Sor.Supawan, etc. In 1990, he was famously knocked out in 33 seconds in his first fight against Wangchannoi Sor.Palangchai via a left hook. Pramot Hoymook claimed that Wangchannoi told Namkabuan to "take it easy" the day before the fight and that Namkabuan would beat him. Regardless, in the late 1980s Namkabuan would enter the competitive peak of his career but was overshadowed by Namphon's fame. At this time Namphon was fighting Samart Payakaroon, Jaroenthong Kiatbanchong, Petchdam Lukborai among other famous fighters.

Namkabuan (blue) catches Mathee Jadeepitak's (red) left kick to plow him against the ropes and throw a knee

During fights, Namkabuan would showcase his ability to land knees on varying spots on his opponent's bodies as well as using the taina (Thai: ไถนา, lit. 'plowing') on his opponents. To perform a plow, Namkabuan would catch and hold his opponent's kicking leg as he charged forward, putting the opponent off-balance until his opponent collided with the ropes of the ring. He would take advantage of his opponent's vulnerable state to throw an unavoidable strike.

Namkabuan was primarily a Muay Femur and Muay Khao stylist (rope-a-dope fighter and clinch specialist). He, like other fighters from the Nongkeepahuyuth gym, also took advantage of a select number of old Muay boran techniques and properly used them in stadium Muay Thai. In the 1990s, Namkabuan's fighting style was considered to be visually pleasing by the Thai audiences which resulted in his nickname of "The Ring Genius" as well as becoming one of the most well-known fighters in Thailand alongside Namphon. He was also referred to by Thai audiences as Jom Taina (The Plowman), Khun Khao Phanom Rung (Phanom Rung Knee Striker), and Jomyuth Phanom Rung (The Phanom Rung Martial Artist).

=== Peak of Muay Thai career ===
From 1989 and onwards Namkabuan was only matched up against fighters who fought at the competitive ceiling of the flyweight to junior lightweight divisions except for the 2 v 1 fight where he fought 2 heavier French fighters. In December 1992, he was the favorite in his matchup against Robert Kaennorasing in Rajadamnern Stadium. Robert surprised the audiences by controlling Namkabuan's aggression throughout the fight to the point where Robert felt safe enough to taunt him; both fighters earned the 1992 Fight of the Year award. Oley Kiatoneway and the heavier Sakmongkol Sithchuchok were 2 of the most significant rivals in his career, with Namkabuan having a record of 6 total wins and 6 total losses against both fighters.

Namkabuan was both praised and criticized for using many clinches to defeat Dokmaipa, Detduang, and Toto from the Por.Pongsawang gym. His 2 fights against Sangtiennoi Sor.Rungrot were praised as the best in his career with Namkabuan beating him in both fights even if Sangtiennoi was fighting at 154.32 lbs/70 kg at the time. Namkabuan also fought against Ramon Dekkers twice, losing the first time and winning their second fight in Morocco for the La Nuit des Titans promotion. In their second bout, Dekkers did not cut weight and came in at 158.73 lbs/72 kg while Namkabuan himself was at 136.69 lbs/62 kg. Despite the massive weight disparity, the French judges gave the win to Namkabuan.

In 1991, after being ranked as the #2 junior featherweight (122 lbs/55.34 kg) fighter in Lumpinee Stadium, Namkabuan could not challenge the Lumpinee Featherweight (126 lbs/57.15 kg) title since it belonged to Namphon. He instead challenged Cherry Sor.Wanich for his Lumpinee Junior Lightweight title (130 lbs/58.97 kg), a belt that Cherry defended against Therdkiat Sitthepitak and Superlek Sorn E-Sarn. Namkabuan would be awarded the title and defended it 5 times throughout 6 years. After defending it against "The Batman" Samkor Kiatmontep in December 1996, the Lumpinee Stadium officials could not find a challenger for Namkabuan in the following 6 months and forced him to give up the title. The highest fight purse Namkabuan received was ฿250,000. Namkabuan would win the Yodmuaythai (Best of Muay Thai) trophy twice against Sangtiennoi and Sakmongkol despite weighing less than them. Namkabuan credits his 2nd fight against Dekkers to be the most difficult in his career.

=== Decline and later years ===
On 11 March 1995, Rainbow Sor.Prantalay fell out of the ring while plowing Den Muangsurin, something that also often happened to Namkabuan when he plowed. Rainbow collided with the edge of the ring and the concrete floor, breaking his neck and putting him out of competition for months. Plowing was banned at the end of 1995, taking away Namkabuan's trademark technique. In 1996, Namkabuan opened a mu kratha restaurant in Khorat, something that Namphon also did. He found that he could earn more money by running the restaurant than fighting, thus he shifted his focus on being a restaurateur. He retired from Muay Thai that year, but still occasionally participated in match ups in the following years. Both he and Namphon would open multiple Korean barbeque restaurants throughout Khorat which made them wealthy in the early 2000s.

Namkabuan married Khop Hoymook, the daughter of his former boss and head trainer Pramot Hoymook. The two were already together before Namkabuan retired from Muay Thai. They bore 2 daughters, one of whom is a veterinarian and the other a singer. Namkabuan's daughters were initially unaware he was a famous Muay Thai fighter and had to be informed about his past by one of their PE teachers.

=== Death ===
Around 4 years after Namphon died, Namkabuan was diagnosed with stage 4 lung cancer in January 2021. He died on 10:00 PM of 7 April 2021 at 48 years old in Maharat Hospital, Nakhon Ratchasima province. It was believed that his cancer was caused by inhaling smoke in the kitchens of his restaurants for approximately 25 years. It was also believed that Namkabuan smoked tobacco, but Pramot Hoymook denied the possibility that he ever used the substance. Namkabuan's funeral was witnessed by numerous attendants including various yodmuay such as Dieselnoi Chor.Thanasukarn, Karuhat Sor.Supawan, and Pudpadnoi Worawut.

== Titles and honors ==
- Lumpinee Stadium
  - 1991 Lumpinee Stadium Super Featherweight (130 lbs) Champion
    - Eight successful title defenses
  - 1992 Lumpinee Stadium Fighter of the Year
- World Muay Thai Council
  - 1992 WMC Super Featherweight (130 lbs) Champion
    - Two successful title defenses
- Awards
  - 1991 Yodmuaythai trophy (vs Sangtiennoi Sitsurapong)
  - 1992 Sports Writers Association of Thailand Fight of the Year (vs Robert Kaennorasing on 23 December)
  - 1993 Yodmuaythai trophy (vs Sakmongkol Sithchuchok)

== Fight record ==
Muay Thai Record (Incomplete)
266 wins (2 (T)KOs), 35 Losses, 2 Draws
Date	Result	Opponent	Event	Location	Method	Round	Time
1998-12-08	Loss	(Thailand) Kaolan Kaovichit	Onesongchai, Lumpinee Stadium	Bangkok, Thailand	Decision	5	3:00
Gave up 10 lbs to Kaolan.
1998–09-29	Loss	(Thailand) Attachai Por.Yosanan	Onesongchai, Lumpinee Stadium	Bangkok, Thailand	Decision	5	3:00
For the Yodmuaythai trophy.
1998-08-07	Loss	(Thailand) Attachai Por.Yosanan	Por.Pramuk, Lumpinee Stadium	Bangkok, Thailand	Decision	5	3:00
1997-07-13	Win	(Netherlands) Ramon Dekkers	La Nuit des Titans	Morocco	Decision	5	3:00
Gave up 18 lbs to Dekkers.
1997-06-01	Win	(Thailand) Lamnamoon Sor.Sumalee	Rangsit Stadium	Rangsit, Thailand	Decision	5	3:00
1997-04-27	Win	(Thailand) Keng Singnakhonkui	Onesongchai, Lumpinee Stadium	Bangkok, Thailand	Decision	5	3:00
Defends the Lumpinee Stadium Super Featherweight (130 lbs) title.
1997-02-08	Loss	(Thailand) Sakmongkol Sitchuchok		Phichit, Thailand	TKO (Punches)	1	
1997-01-05	Loss	(Thailand) Pairot Wor.Wolapon	Chachoengsao Stadium	Chachoengsao, Thailand	Decision	5	3:00
1996-11-12	Win	(Thailand) Samkor Chor.Ratchatsupak	Onesongchai, Lumpinee Stadium	Bangkok, Thailand	Decision (Unanimous)	5	3:00
Defends the Lumpinee Stadium Super Featherweight (130 lbs) title and WMC World Super Featherweight (130 lbs) title.
1996-10-19	Win	(Thailand) Samkor Chor.Ratchatsupak	Thahansuea, Lumpinee Stadium	Bangkok, Thailand	Decision	5	3:00
1996-08-25	Loss	(Thailand) Pairot Wor.Wolapon	Beer Chang Tournament, Lumpinee Stadium	Bangkok, Thailand	Decision	5	3:00
1996-07-20	Win	(France) Manu Ntoh (France) Eddy Saban	Onesongchai, Phanom Rung Historical Park	Chaloem Phra Kiat, Thailand	Decision	5	3:00
Ntoh fought the first three rounds and Saban the last two.
1996-06-22	Loss	(Thailand) Jongsanan Fairtex	Beer Chang Tournament, Lumpinee Stadium	Bangkok, Thailand	Decision	5	3:00
1996-05-18	Win	(Thailand) Sakmongkol Sithchuchok	Beer Chang Tournament, Lumpinee Stadium	Bangkok, Thailand	Decision	5	3:00
1996-03-29	Draw	(Thailand) Mathee Jadeepitak	Onesongchai, Lumpinee Stadium	Bangkok, Thailand	Decision (Split)	5	3:00
1996-03-05	Win	(Thailand) Prabpramlek Sitnarong	Onesongchai, Lumpinee Stadium	Bangkok, Thailand	Decision	5	3:00
Defends the Lumpinee Stadium Super Featherweight (130 lbs) title and wins the vacant WMC World Super Featherweight (130 lbs) title.
1995-12-08	Win	(Thailand) Lamnamoon Sor.Sumalee	Onesongchai, Lumpinee Stadium	Bangkok, Thailand	Decision	5	3:00
1995-10-31	Win	(Thailand) Lamnamoon Sor.Sumalee	Onesongchai, Lumpinee Stadium	Bangkok, Thailand	Decision	5	3:00
1995-09-12	Win	(Thailand) Chatchai Paiseetong	Onesongchai, Lumpinee Stadium	Bangkok, Thailand	Decision	5	3:00
1995-08-22	Win	(Thailand) Samkor Chor.Rathchatasupak	Ruamnamjailumpinee, Lumpinee Stadium	Bangkok, Thailand	Decision	5	3:00
1995-07-10	Win	(Thailand) Mathee Jadeepitak	Chaomueangchon, Rajadamnern Stadium	Bangkok, Thailand	Decision	5	3:00
1995-04-28	Loss	(Thailand) Kongnapa B.M.Service	Onesongchai, Lumpinee Stadium	Bangkok, Thailand	Decision	5	3:00
1995-02-28	Loss	(Thailand) Orono Por.MuangUbon	Onesongchai, Lumpinee Stadium	Bangkok, Thailand	Decision	5	3:00
1995-01-31	Loss	(Thailand) Pairot Wor.Wolapon	Onesongchai, Lumpinee Stadium	Bangkok, Thailand	Decision (Unanimous)	5	3:00
1994-10-04	Loss	(Thailand) Sakmongkol Sithchuchok	Thahansuea, Lumpinee Stadium	Bangkok, Thailand	Decision	5	3:00
Gave up 10 lbs to Sakmongkol.
1994-09-09	Loss	(Thailand) Sakmongkol Sithchuchok	Onesongchai, Lumpinee Stadium	Bangkok, Thailand	Decision	5	3:00
Gave up 10 lbs to Sakmongkol.
1994-08-09	Win	(Thailand) Chatchai Paiseetong	Onesongchai, Lumpinee Stadium	Bangkok, Thailand	Decision	5	3:00
1994-06-08	Win	(Thailand) Jongrak Lukprabaht	Phalangnum, Rajadamnern Stadium	Bangkok, Thailand	Decision	5	3:00
1994-05-03	Win	(Thailand) Robert Kaennorasing	Onesongchai, Lumpinee Stadium	Bangkok, Thailand	Decision	5	3:00
1994-03-22	Win	(Thailand) Mathee Jadeepitak	Fairtex + Onesongchai, Lumpinee Stadium	Bangkok, Thailand	KO (Flying knee)	2	
1994-02-21	Win	(Thailand) Mathee Jadeepitak	Kiatsingnoi, Rajadamnern Stadium	Bangkok, Thailand	Decision	5	3:00
1994-01-26	Win	(Thailand) Jongrak Lukprabaht	Phalangnum, Rajadamnern Stadium	Bangkok, Thailand	Decision	5	3:00
1993-11-30	Win	(Thailand) Oley Kiatoneway	Onesongchai, Lumpinee Stadium	Bangkok, Thailand	Decision	5	3:00
1993-10-05	Win	(Thailand) Pairot Wor.Wolapon	Onesongchai Lumpinee Stadium	Bangkok, Thailand	Decision (Unanimous)	5	3:00
Defends the Lumpinee Stadium Super Featherweight (130 lbs) title.
1993-09-07	Win	(Thailand) Jongsanan Luklongbangkaew	Onesongchai, Lumpinee Stadium	Bangkok, Thailand	Decision	5	3:00
1993-08-06	Win	(Thailand) Boonlai Sor.Thanikul	Onesongchai, Lumpinee Stadium	Bangkok, Thailand	Decision	5	3:00
1993-06-11	Loss	(Thailand) Oley Kiatoneway	Onesongchai, Lumpinee Stadium	Bangkok, Thailand	Decision	5	3:00
1993-03-29	Win	(Thailand) Sakmongkol Sithchuchok	Jaturong 14 + Kiatsingnoi, Rajadamnern Stadium	Bangkok, Thailand	Decision	5	3:00
Receives the Yodmuaythai trophy.
1992-12-23	Loss	(Thailand) Robert Kaennorasing	Kiatphetnoi, Rajadamnern Stadium	Bangkok, Thailand	Decision	5	3:00
1992-11-20	Win	(Thailand) Boonlai Sor.Thanikul	Onesongchai, Lumpinee Stadium	Bangkok, Thailand	Decision	5	3:00
1992-09-27	Win	(Thailand) Nuathoranee Thongracha	Onesongchai, Burswood Casino	Perth, Australia	Decision (Unanimous)	5	3:00
Defends the Lumpinee Stadium Super Featherweight (130 lbs) title and wins the vacant WMC World Super Featherweight (130 lbs) title.
1992-06-30	Draw	(Thailand) Nuathoranee Thongracha	Onesongchai, Lumpinee Stadium	Bangkok, Thailand	Decision	5	3:00
1992-06-09	Win	(Thailand) Therdkiat Sitthepitak	Onesongchai, Lumpinee Stadium	Bangkok, Thailand	Decision (Unanimous)	5	3:00
Defends the Lumpinee Stadium Super Featherweight (130 lbs) title.
1992-03-20	Loss	(Thailand) Boonlai Sor.Thanikul	Onesongchai, Lumpinee Stadium	Bangkok, Thailand	Decision	5	3:00
1992-02-21	Win	(Thailand) Sakmongkol Sithchuchok	Onesongchai, Lumpinee Stadium	Bangkok, Thailand	Decision	5	3:00
Defends the Lumpinee Stadium Super Featherweight (130 lbs) title.
1992-01-21	Win	(Thailand) Jongsanan Luklongbangkaew	Onesongchai, Lumpinee Stadium	Bangkok, Thailand	Decision	5	3:00
1991-12-27	Win	(Thailand) Wangchannoi Sor.Palangchai	Onesongchai, Lumpinee Stadium	Bangkok, Thailand	Decision	5	3:00
1991-11-26	Loss	(Thailand) Wangchannoi Sor.Palangchai	Onesongchai, Lumpinee Stadium	Bangkok, Thailand	Decision	5	3:00
1991-10-25	Win	(Thailand) Sangtiennoi Sitsurapong	Onesongchai, Lumpinee Stadium	Bangkok, Thailand	Decision	5	3:00
Receives the Yodmuaythai trophy. Gave up weight to Sangtiennoi.
1991-09-24	Win	(Thailand) Sangtiennoi Sitsurapong	Onesongchai, Lumpinee Stadium	Bangkok, Thailand	Decision	5	3:00
Gave up around 15 lbs to Sangtiennoi.
1991-09-03	Win	(Thailand) Nuathoranee Thongracha	Onesongchai, Lumpinee Stadium	Bangkok, Thailand	Decision	5	3:00
1991-08-06	Win	(Thailand) Nuathoranee Thongracha	Onesongchai, Lumpinee Stadium	Bangkok, Thailand	Decision (Majority)	5	3:00
Defends the Lumpinee Stadium Super Featherweight (130 lbs) title.
1991-07-02	Win	(Thailand) Petchdam Sor.Bodin	Yodmuaylok, Lumpinee Stadium	Bangkok, Thailand	Decision	5	3:00
Wins 6.5 million baht side-bet.
1991-05-31	Win	(Thailand) Cherry Sor.Wanich	Onesongchai, Lumpinee Stadium	Bangkok, Thailand	Decision (Unanimous)	5	3:00
Wins the Lumpinee Stadium Super Featherweight (130 lbs) title.
1991-04-30	Win	(Thailand) Wangchannoi Sor.Palangchai	Onesongchai + Por.Pongsawang, Lumpinee Stadium	Bangkok, Thailand	Decision	5	3:00
1991-03-29	Win	(Thailand) Jaroenthong Kiatbanchong	Onesongchai, Lumpinee Stadium	Bangkok, Thailand	Decision	5	3:00
1991-03-01	Win	(Thailand) Samranthong Kiatbanchong	Onesongchai, Lumpinee Stadium	Bangkok, Thailand	Decision	5	3:00
1991-01-04	Win	(Thailand) Dokmaipa Por.Pongsawang	Onesongchai, Lumpinee Stadium	Bangkok, Thailand	Decision	5	3:00
1990-12-11	Win	(Thailand) Oley Kiatoneway	Chaomangkon + Onesongchai, Lumpinee Stadium	Bangkok, Thailand	Decision	5	3:00
1990-10-30	Loss	(Thailand) Wangchannoi Sor.Palangchai	Onesongchai, Lumpinee Stadium	Bangkok, Thailand	KO (Left hook)	1	0:33
1990-09-25	Loss	(Thailand) Samranthong Kiatbanchong	Fairtex + Onesongchai, Lumpinee Stadium	Bangkok, Thailand	KO (Elbows)	3	
1990-08-31	Win	(Thailand) Oley Kiatoneway	Onesongchai, Lumpinee Stadium	Bangkok, Thailand	Decision	5	3:00
1990-07-10	Win	(Thailand) Detduang Por.Pongsawang	Onesongchai, Lumpinee Stadium	Bangkok, Thailand	Decision	5	3:00
1990-06-15	Loss	(Thailand) Pimaranlek Sitaran	Daorungtvsi 7, Lumpinee Stadium	Bangkok, Thailand	Decision	5	3:00
1990-05-15	Win	(Thailand) Karuhat Sor.Supawan	Onesongchai, Lumpinee Stadium	Bangkok, Thailand	Decision	5	3:00
1990-03-23	Win	(Thailand) Noppadet Narumon	Petchyindee, Lumpinee Stadium	Bangkok, Thailand	Decision	5	3:00
1990-02-06	Loss	(Thailand) Oley Kiatoneway	Onesongchai, Lumpinee Stadium	Bangkok, Thailand	Decision	5	3:00
1990-01-19	Win	(Thailand) Karuhat Sor.Supawan	Yodmuaylok, Lumpinee Stadium	Bangkok, Thailand	KO (leg kick)	3	
1989-12-27	Win	(Thailand) Toto Por.Pongsawang	Wanmuaythai, Rajadamnern Stadium	Bangkok, Thailand	Decision	5	3:00
1989-11-28	Win	(Thailand) Pairojnoi Sor.Siamchai	Onesongchai, Lumpinee Stadium	Bangkok, Thailand	Decision	5	3:00
1989-11-03	Win	(Thailand) Paruhatlek Sitchunthong	Onesongchai, Lumpinee Stadium	Bangkok, Thailand	Decision	5	3:00
1989-10-23	Win	(Thailand) Hippy Singmanee	Yodmuaythaksin	Koh Samui, Thailand	Decision	5	3:00
1989-10-03	Win	(Thailand) Puja Sittuantong	Lumpinee Stadium	Bangkok, Thailand	Decision	5	3:00
1989-09-19	Win	(Thailand) Kraiwannoi SitKruOd	Lumpinee Stadium	Bangkok, Thailand	Decision	5	3:00
1989-07-11	Loss	(Thailand) Hippy Singmanee	Onesongchai, Lumpinee Stadium	Bangkok, Thailand	TKO (Doctor stoppage)	3	
For the Lumpinee Stadium Light Flyweight (108 lbs) title
1989-06-17	Win	(Thailand) Kompayak Singmanee	Lumpinee Stadium	Bangkok, Thailand	Decision	5	3:00
1989-05-27	Win	(Thailand) Kruekchai Sor.Kettalingchan	Lumpinee Stadium	Bangkok, Thailand	Decision	5	3:00
1989-05-08	Win	(Thailand) Kongkiat Sor.Rangsanpanit		Sisaket, Thailand	Decision	5	3:00
1989-04-29	Win	(Thailand) Pornimit Muanglopburi	Lumpinee Stadium	Bangkok, Thailand	Decision	5	3:00
1989-03-25	Loss	(Thailand) Deenueng Thor.Pattanakit	Lumpinee Stadium	Bangkok, Thailand	KO	3	
1989-02-21	Win	(Thailand) Kaowaew Kor.Pongkiat	Onesongchai, Lumpinee Stadium	Bangkok, Thailand	Decision	5	3:00
1989-01-31	Loss	(Thailand) Kaowaew Kor.Pongkiat	Onesongchai, Lumpinee Stadium	Bangkok, Thailand	Decision	5	3:00
1988-12-16	Win	(Thailand) Singtongnoi Sor.Siamchai	Onesongchai, Lumpinee Stadium	Bangkok, Thailand	Decision	5	3:00
1988-10-28	Loss	(Thailand) Dejrit Sor.Ploenjit	Fairtex + Onesongchai, Lumpinee Stadium	Bangkok, Thailand	Decision	5	3:00
1988-10-11	Win	(Thailand) Huahinlek Lukwaree	Onesongchai, Lumpinee Stadium	Bangkok, Thailand	Decision	5	3:00
1988-07-26	Win	(Thailand) Akaradej Sitkhosa	Onesongchai, Lumpinee Stadium	Bangkok, Thailand	Decision	5	3:00
Wins 100,000 baht side-bet.
1988-05-03	Loss	(Thailand) Oley Kiatoneway	Onesongchai, Lumpinee Stadium	Bangkok, Thailand	Decision	5	3:00
1988-02-13	Win	(Thailand) Saengdao Kiatanan	Lumpinee Stadium	Bangkok, Thailand	Decision	5	3:00
Legend: Win Loss Draw/No contest Notes
