= Padejseuk Kiatsamran =

Thai former professional Muay Thai fighter

- Born: Apidet Thuenthet; August 29, 1968 (age 58); Bang Nam Priao, Chachoengsao, Thailand
- Native name: อภิเดช เถื่อนเทศ
- Other names: Padejseuk SitWaiMai (เผด็จศึก ศิษย์วัดใหม่); Padejseuk Sor.Ploenchit (เผด็จศึก ส.เพลินจิต)
- Nickname: Left Leg of Blazing Fire (แข้งซ้ายไฟพะเนียง)
- Division: Super Bantamweight; Featherweight
- Style: Muay Thai (Muay Femur)
- Stance: Southpaw
- Team: SitWatMai; Sor.Ploenchit; Kiatsamran

Other information
- Occupation: Subdistrict councilor

Apidet Thuenthet (Thai: อภิเดช เถื่อนเทศ; born August 29, 1968), known professionally as Padejseuk Kiatsamran (Thai: เผด็จศึก เกียรติสำราญ), is a Thai former professional Muay Thai fighter. He is a former Rajadamnern Stadium Super Bantamweight Champion who was active during the 1980s and 1990s.

== Biography and career ==
He trained at SitWaiMai gym and Sor.Ploenchit gym before settling at the Kiatsamran gym.

He fought during the Golden Era of Muay Thai against many notable fighters including Chamuekpet Hapalang, Robert Kaennorasing, Namphon Nongkeepahuyuth, Rajasak Sor.Vorapin, Jomwo Chernyim, Kangwannoi Or.Sribualoi, Jack Kiatniwat, Phayanoi Sor.Thasanee, and Taweechai Wor.Preecha.

== Titles and honours ==
- Rajadamnern Stadium
  - 1990 Rajadamnern Stadium Super Bantamweight (122 lbs) Champion

== Fight record ==
Muay Thai Record (Incomplete)
Date	Result	Opponent	Event	Location	Method	Round	Time
1995-08-19	Win	(Thailand) Sonram Sor.Udomson		Thailand	Decision	5	3:00
1995-02-15	Loss	(Thailand) Namphon Nongkeepahuyuth	Rajadamnern Stadium	Bangkok, Thailand	Decision	5	3:00
1994-07-26	Win	(Thailand) Suwitlek Sor.Sakawarat		Bangkok, Thailand	Decision	5	3:00
1994-05-06	Loss	(Thailand) Anantasak Panyuthapum	Lumpinee Stadium	Bangkok, Thailand	TKO	2	
1994-04-07	Win	(Thailand) Saenkeng Pinsinchai	Rajadamnern Stadium	Bangkok, Thailand	Decision	5	3:00
1994-03-18	Win	(Thailand) Buakaw Por.Pisitchet	Lumpinee Stadium	Bangkok, Thailand	Decision	5	3:00
1994-02-10	Loss	(Thailand) Saenkeng Pinsinchai	Rajadamnern Stadium	Bangkok, Thailand	Decision	5	3:00
1993-12-28	Win	(Thailand) Duangkeaw Hiranyarat	Lumpinee Boxing	Bangkok, Thailand	Decision	5	3:00
1993-02-23	Loss	(Thailand) Panomrung Por.Pisitchet		Thailand	KO		
1993-02-02	Win	(Thailand) Kangwannoi Or.Sribualoi		Thailand	Decision	5	3:00
1993-01-12	Win	(Thailand) Wisanlek Lookbangplasoi	Lumpinee Stadium	Thailand	KO (head kick)	4	
1992-10-20	Loss	(Thailand) Duangkaew Sor.Banmai		Thailand	Decision	5	3:00
1992-09-30	Win	(Thailand) Nopkao Tor.Chuwanon	Rajadamnern Stadium	Thailand	Decision	5	3:00
1992-01-29	Loss	(Thailand) Robert Kaennorasing	Rajadamnern Stadium	Bangkok, Thailand	TKO (referee stoppage)	2	
Loses the Rajadamnern Stadium Featherweight (126 lbs) title.
1991-11-25	Loss	(Thailand) Phadphon Dechrittha	Rajadamnern Stadium	Bangkok, Thailand	Decision	5	3:00
1991-10-23	Loss	(Thailand) Phadphon Dechrittha	Rajadamnern Stadium	Bangkok, Thailand	Decision	5	3:00
1991-09-28	Win	(Thailand) Chamuekpet Hapalang	Rajadamnern Stadium	Bangkok, Thailand	Decision	5	3:00
1991-08-28	Draw	(Thailand) Chamuekpet Hapalang	Rajadamnern Stadium	Bangkok, Thailand	Decision	5	3:00
1991-07-24	Loss	(Thailand) Robert Kaennorasing	Rajadamnern Stadium	Bangkok, Thailand	Decision	5	3:00
1991-06-12	Win	(Thailand) Yodkhuntap Sitkruphat	Rajadamnern Stadium	Bangkok, Thailand	Decision	5	3:00
1991-04-07	Loss	(Thailand) Rajasak Sor.Vorapin		Samut Sakhon, Thailand	Decision	5	3:00
1991-02-21	Win	(Thailand) Santos Devy	Rajadamnern Stadium	Bangkok, Thailand	Decision	5	3:00
1990-12-20	Loss	(Thailand) Taweechai Wor.Preecha		Thailand	Decision	5	3:00
1990-11-05	Win	(Thailand) Boonmee Sitchuchon	Rajadamnern Stadium	Bangkok, Thailand	Decision	5	3:00
1990-08-13	Loss	(Thailand) Neungsiam Kiatwichian	Rajadamnern Stadium	Bangkok, Thailand	TKO (punches)	3	
1990-07-09	Loss	(Thailand) Rajasak Sor.Vorapin	Rajadamnern Stadium	Bangkok, Thailand	Decision	5	3:00
Loses the Rajadamnern Stadium Super Bantamweight (122 lbs) title.
1990-05–03	Win	(Thailand) Taweechai Wor.Preecha	Rajadamnern Stadium	Bangkok, Thailand	Decision	5	3:00
Wins the Rajadamnern Stadium Super Bantamweight (122 lbs) title.
1990-02-22	Loss	(Thailand) Rajasak Sor.Vorapin	Rajadamnern Stadium	Bangkok, Thailand	Decision	5	3:00
1990-02-03	Win	(England) Paul		England	KO	3	
1989-12-21	Loss	(Thailand) Jack Kiatniwat		Thailand	Decision	5	3:00
1989-12-06	Win	(Thailand) Jomwo Chor.Waikul	Rajadamnern Stadium	Bangkok, Thailand	Decision	5	3:00
1989-11-13	Win	(Thailand) Chanalert Muanghatyai	Rajadamnern Stadium	Bangkok, Thailand	Decision	5	3:00
1989-10-05	Win	(Thailand) Jomwo Chor.Waikul	Rajadamnern Stadium	Bangkok, Thailand	Decision	5	3:00
1989-09-05	Loss	(Thailand) Grandprixnoi Muangchaiyaphum		Thailand	Decision	5	3:00
1989-08-08	Win	(Thailand) Phajonjit Luktumalee	Lumpinee Stadium	Thailand	Decision	5	3:00
1989-07-21	Win	(Thailand) Samingnoi Kiatkamchai	Rajadamnern Stadium	Bangkok, Thailand	Decision	5	3:00
1989-05-08	Win	(Thailand) Klaisuwit Sunkilanongkhee		Thailand	Decision	5	3:00
1989-04-24	Win	(Thailand) Phachanjit Lukmatulee		Thailand	Decision	5	3:00
1989-03-22	Win	(Thailand) Phayanoi Sor.Thasanee	Rajadamnern Stadium	Bangkok, Thailand	Decision	5	3:00
1989-02-22	Win	(Thailand) Wanghin Por.Chaiwat		Thailand	Decision	5	3:00
1989-01-18	Loss	(Thailand) Payakdam Yutthakit		Thailand	KO	3	
Legend: Win Loss Draw/No contest Notes
