= Sor Vorapin =

Sor Vorapin (Thai: ส.วรพิน; stylized as S.Vorapin or S.Warrapin) is a Muaythai and professional boxing gym based in Bangkok, Thailand.

== History ==
This gym was established in 1979 by a couple, Surapon and Vorapin Rungsikulpipat, to promote Muay Thai. Later, Ratchasak Sor Vorapin (Note: Fighters in Thailand often adopt the name of their gym as their ring surname.) became the gym's first fighter. He won championships in three weight classes at both Rajadamnern and Lumpinee Stadiums (Junior Bantamweight – 115 lbs, Junior Featherweight – 122 lbs, and Featherweight – 126 lbs), which brought recognition to the gym.

Ratanapol Sor Vorapin won the IBF Mini Flyweight (105 lbs) world title on December 10, 1992, at Nimibutr Stadium inside the National Stadium in Bangkok. He became a two-time champion and successfully defended his title 20 times. Later, his younger brother, Ratanachai Sor Vorapin, won the WBO Bantamweight (118 lbs) world title on May 7, 2004, with a unanimous decision over Mexican boxer Cruz Carbajal in Nakhon Ratchasima Province. Two other younger brothers, Kaichon and Kosol Sor Vorapin, were also fighters at the gym.

Originally, the gym had two branches: one in Bang Lamphu near Khaosan Road and Wat Chana Songkhram on the Phra Nakhon side, and the other on Soi Suan Phak 1 in Taling Chan District on the Thonburi side. However, the Bang Lamphu branch has since closed, leaving only the Taling Chan location. Today, the gym no longer produces fighters competing under its name and functions solely as a Muay Thai training facility for enthusiasts.
