= Chamuekpet Hapalang =

Thai former professional Muay Thai fighter and boxer

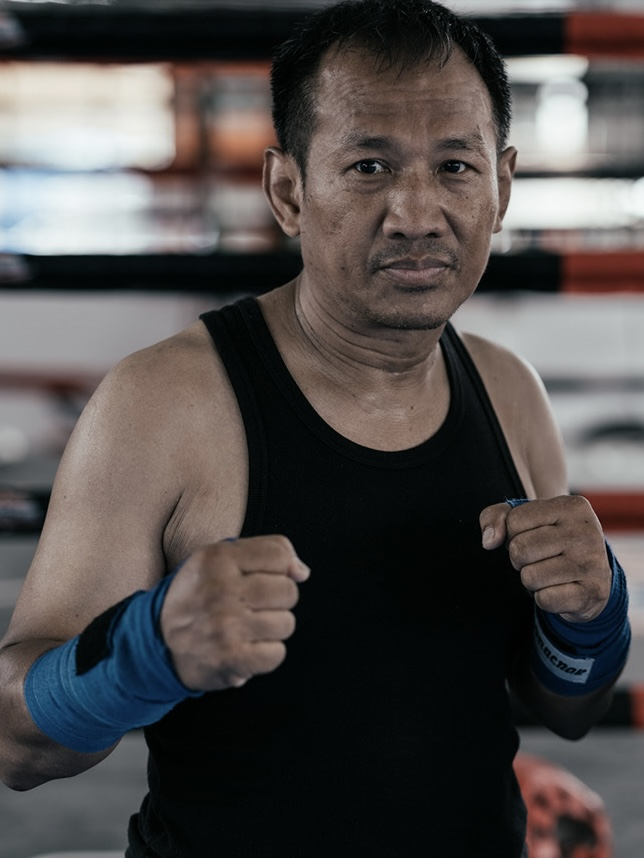
- Chamuekpet in 2023
- Born: Vichean Bootdee; August 10, 1962 (age 64); Si Racha, Chonburi, Thailand
- Native name: วิเชียร บุตรดี
- Other names: Chamuekpet Sor.Worakulchai; Chamuekpet Sor.Thanikul; Chamuekpet Fairtex; Chamuekpet Sor.Sirinan; Chamuekpet Thor.Yinyong (ฉมวกเพชร ธ.ยืนยง); Chamuekpet Chorchamuang; Chamuekpet Singwangcha
- Nickname: Mr. Computer Knee (ขุนเข่าคอมพิวเตอร์); Mr. Young Forever; Evergreen; Father Time is a Myth (พ่อบานไม่รู้โรย)
- Height: 168 cm (5 ft 6 in)
- Division: Pinweight; Mini Flyweight; Light Flyweight; Flyweight; Bantamweight; Super Bantamweight; Featherweight
- Style: Muay Thai (Muay Bouk / Muay Khao in 1970s–80s) (Muay Femur in 1990s); Boxing
- Stance: Southpaw
- Team: Sor.Worakulchai Gym (1973-1977); Hapalang Gym (1977-1991); Singwangcha Gym (1990s)
- Trainer: Dieselnoi Chor Thanasukarn; Samart Payakaroon
- Years active: c. 1974–2000

Professional boxing record
- Total: 11
- Wins: 10
- By knockout: 6
- Losses: 1

Kickboxing record
- Total: 250
- Wins: 200
- By knockout: 15
- Losses: 48
- Draws: 2

Other information
- Children: 4 children
- Boxing record from BoxRec

Vichean Bootdee (Thai: วิเชียร บุตรดี; born: August 10, 1962), known professionally as Chamuekpet Hapalang (Thai: ฉมวกเพชร ห้าพลัง), is a Thai former professional Muay Thai fighter and boxer. He is a former four-time Lumpinee Stadium champion and five-time Rajadamnern Stadium champion across seven divisions, as well as the 1985 Sports Writers Association of Thailand Fighter of the Year, who famous during the 1980s and 1990s.

He fought in Bangkok in the late 1970s to the 1990s, and later on fought in Japan where he would also become a well-known Muay Thai trainer. During the 1970s to 1980s, he was a southpaw Muay Bouk and Muay Khao hybrid fighter which meant that he was a well-rounded pressure fighter with knee fighting expertise. His ability to change his knee striking style depending on his opponent earned him the nickname "Mr. Computer Knee" by the Thai media. In the 1990s, as Chamuekpet was getting older, his friend Samart Payakaroon would train him to become a rope-a-dope Muay Femur fighter.

== Biography and career ==
=== Early life ===
Vichean Bootdee was born in Amphoe Si Racha, Chonburi province, Thailand on August 10, 1962. He was inspired to take up Muay Thai by watching his older brother Claynoi Rasemechan train in the Sor.Worakulchai gym. He was later recruited by the famous Dieselnoi Chor.Thanasukarn who was also training at the Sor.Worakulchai camp at the time; Dieselnoi would then become Bootdee's mentor and teammate. After taking the ring name of Chamuekpet Sor.Worakulchai as suggested by Dieselnoi, Bootdee began participating in Muay Thai fights at the age of 12 in his neighborhood. He fought in Mueang Chon Buri and Pattaya in his local province until he ran out of opponents. He would then fight near and in Khon Kaen province for 2–3 years. He participated in around 40 fights in his time in the Sor.Worakulchai gym.

At 15-years-old he traveled with Claynoi to Bangkok and made his debut at the prestigious Rajadamnern Stadium in late 1978. He won his first title in the Pinweight division at 17-years-old by defeating Samart Payakaroon by decision in 1980, a fight that Chamuekpet himself doubted he could win. He and Samart would fight 2 more times, resulting in the two becoming best friends.

=== Fighting style ===
Chamuekpet started his career as a southpaw Muay Bouk and Muay Khao hybrid fighter which meant that he was a pressure fighter who was also adept at knee striking. He was known for his preference to land straight knee strikes (knee equivalent to a straight punch). Most Muay Khao fighters would rely on strength and aggression in order to land knees but Chamuekpet would change his fighting style in order to find new ways to land straight knees into his opponent's sternums thus Chamuekpet received the nickname of "Mr. Computer Knee" (Khun Khao Computer) during the early 1980s. During this time he was also described as one of the three fighters to have the best teeps (push kicks) in Thailand; the other two were Samart Payakaroon and "Mr. Teep" Chanchai Sor.Tamarangsri.

Chamuekpet was described in Thailand to have a "strong mind" (strong will) which suited his pressuring Muay Bouk style. In the 1990s, Samart Payakaroon advised Chamuekpet to stop taking unnecessary damage if he wanted to continue his Muay Thai career and so Samart would teach him the rope-a-dope Muay Femur style wherein Chamuekpet would keep his back close to the ropes of the ring and would be more reserved with his strikes.

Despite the change to his style, Chamuekpet would retain his disruptive teeps and well-timed straight knees. Even as Chamuekpet preferred to back away from his opponents to avoid getting hit, he would still be mostly unaffected by his opponent's strikes and as a result he was described in Thai as being "slow to lose". His teeps and knees strikes were his most preferred techniques.

=== Prime years ===
Both Chamuekpet and Dieselnoi were purchased and transferred to the Hapalang gym where they would train in the 1980s. The Hapalang gym (also known as the Sor.Sirinan gym) was known for producing reputable Muay Khao fighters including Panomtuanlek Hapalang. The three of them would also adopt Sor.Thanikul into their ring names but were actually still training at Hapalang.In 1985 Chamuekpet would win the highly prestigious Fighter of the Year title by the Sports Writers Association of Thailand, the most respected variant of the Fighter of the Year award in Muay Thai.

He was consistently matched up against best possible opponents in the weight classes that he was in such as Samart and Kongtoranee Payakaroon, Oley Kiatoneway, Samransak Muangsurin, Jaroenthong Kiatbanchong, Wangchannoi Sor.Palangchai, etc. In Chamuekpet's first fight against Langsuan Panyuthaphum on March 4, 1988 in Lumpinee Stadium, the owner of the Hapalang gym Chaiwat "Ngo Hapalang" Phalungwattanakit was publicly murdered during the bout. The two fighters would later rematch with Chamuekpet emerging as the victor.

During the golden era of Muay Thai, Chamuekpet broke the record for the highest number of accumulated belts from the Lumpinee and Rajadamnern stadiums. He won 4 Lumpinee and 5 Rajadamnern belts across 7 weight classes, a record that is still unbeaten. Chamuekpet's favorite memory from his Muay Thai career was his successful title fight against Chaidet Kiatcharnsing wherein he won by KO. 1990 was the best year of his Muay Thai career.

Chamuekpet's time at the elite level of the Bangkok circuit was unusually long, as by the 1990s, almost all fighters of Chamuekpet's age had retired. (Note: Muay Thai fighters in Thailand usually retire in their late 20s, but Chamuekpet continued fighting into his 30s.) Despite often being around 10 years older than his opponents at this time, Chamuekpet would still be able to defeat younger fighters such as Chaidet Kiatcharnsing, Muangfahlek Kiatwichian, and Paidaeng Lerksak Gym (Paidaeng Devy). The Thai media would then label him as "Evergreen," "Mr. Young Forever," and "Father Time is a Myth" (Pho Banmairuroy). He trained at the Hapalang gym for 14 years.

After starting his Muay Thai career as Chamuekpet Sor.Worakulchai he would change the latter half of his ring name 7 times. He adopted Sor.Thanikul, Fairtex, Sor.Sirinan, Hapalang, Thor.Yinyong, Chorchamuang, and Singwangcha into his ring name. (Note: The Thai spellings of all of Chamuekpet's ring names are as follows: ฉมวกเพชร ส.วรกุลชัย, ฉมวกเพชร ส.ธนิกุล, ฉมวกเพชร แฟร์แท็กซ์, ฉมวกเพชร ห้าพลัง, ฉมวกเพชร ส.ศิรินันท์, ฉมวกเพชร ธ.ยืนยง, ฉมวกเพชร ช่อชะมวง, and ฉมวกเพชร สิงห์วังชา.) He is primarily referred to as Chamuekpet Hapalang.

=== Boxing career and retirement ===
In 1996 he began to participate in professional boxing fights under his 8th ring name of Chamuekpet Singwangcha as he trained at the Singwangcha gym. He would win the PABA Featherweight championship in 1997 defended it 4 times before relinquishing the title. Chamuekpet would have his last fight in 2000 against kickboxer Kensaku Maeda and won despite having his arm broken during the bout. Chamuekpet was forced to retire from combat sports due to the injury.

After retirement Chamuekpet set up a Muay Thai gym in Tokyo, Japan and became a well-known Muay Thai trainer in the country along with numerous other fellow former Muay Thai fighters. As of 2020, he has been living in Japan and had been a trainer in Tokyo for around 20 years. He is married and has 4 children as of 2012.

Chamuekpet has cited Vicharnnoi Porntawee, Orachunnoi Hor.Mahachai, Dieselnoi Chor.Thanasukarn, Samart Payakaroon, and Kaensak Sor.Ploenjit to be his top 5 best Muay Thai fighters.

== Titles and honors ==
=== Muay Thai ===
- Lumpinee Stadium
  - 1980 Lumpinee Stadium Pinweight (102 lbs) Champion
    - One successful title defense
  - 1981 Lumpinee Stadium Light Flyweight (108 lbs) Champion
  - 1982 Lumpinee Stadium Flyweight (112 lbs) Champion
  - 1983 Lumpinee Stadium Bantamweight (118 lbs) Champion
- Rajadamnern Stadium
  - 1980 Rajadamnern Stadium Mini Flyweight (105 lbs) Champion
    - One successful title defense
  - 1989 Rajadamnern Stadium Super Bantamweight (122 lbs) Champion
  - 1990 Rajadamnern Stadium Featherweight (126 lbs) Champion
    - One successful title defense
  - 1994 Rajadamnern Stadium Super Bantamweight (122 lbs) Champion
  - 1994 Rajadamnern Stadium Featherweight (126 lbs) Champion
- Sports Writers Association of Thailand
  - 1985 Sports Writers Association of Thailand Fighter of the Year
  - 1994 Sports Writers Association of Thailand Fight of the Year (vs Chaidet Kiatcharnsing on July 27)

=== Professional boxing ===
- Pan Asian Boxing Association
  - 1997–1998 PABA Featherweight Champion (4 defenses)

== Muay Thai record ==
Muay Thai Record
200 Wins (15 (T)KOs), 48 Losses, 2 Draws
Date	Result	Opponent	Event	Location	Method	Round	Time
2000-03-19	Win	(Japan) Kensaku Maeda	K-1 Burning 2000	Yokohama, Japan	Decision (Unanimous)	5	3:00
1998-11-14	Win	(Japan) Takehiro Murahama	Shootboxing GROUND ZERO TOKYO	Tokyo, Japan	Decision (Unanimous)	5	3:00
1996-04-17	Loss	(Thailand) Chutin Por.Tawachai	Rajadamnern Stadium	Bangkok, Thailand	Decision	5	3:00
1996-02-21	Loss	(Thailand) Chaidet Kiatchansing		Bangkok, Thailand	Decision	5	3:00
1996-01-27	Win	(Japan) Takehiro Murahama	Shootboxing GROUND ZERO YOKOHAMA	Yokohama, Japan	Decision (Split)	5	3:00
1995-12-27	Win	(Thailand) Komkiat Sor.Thanikul	Rajadamnern Stadium	Bangkok, Thailand	Decision	5	3:00
1995-11-08	Loss	(Thailand) Chaidet Kiatchansing	Rajadamnern Stadium	Bangkok, Thailand	Decision	5	3:00
1995-09-27	Win	(Thailand) Patpon Dejruta	Rajadamnern Stadium	Bangkok, Thailand	Decision	5	3:00
1995-08-30	Draw	(Thailand) Patpon Dejruta	Rajadamnern Stadium	Bangkok, Thailand	Decision	5	3:00
1995-08-07	Win	(Thailand) Komkiat Sor.Thanikul	Rajadamnern Stadium	Bangkok, Thailand	Decision	5	3:00
1995-07-17	Win	(Thailand) Banleudet Lukprabaht	Rajadamnern Stadium	Bangkok, Thailand	KO (Right uppercut)	2	
1995-04-26	Loss	(Thailand) Prabseuk Sitsantat	Rajadamnern Stadium	Bangkok, Thailand	Decision	5	3:00
1995-04-05	Win	(Thailand) Banleudet Lukprabaht	Rajadamnern Stadium	Bangkok, Thailand	Decision	5	3:00
1995-03-15	Win	(Thailand) Boonlong Sor.Thanikul	Rajadamnern Stadium	Bangkok, Thailand	Decision	5	3:00
1995-02-22	Win	(Thailand) Yutahat Sor.Narongchai	Rajadamnern Stadium	Bangkok, Thailand	Decision	5	3:00
1995-01-07	Win	(Japan) Atsushi Tateshima	AJKF CHALLENGER I	Tokyo, Japan	Decision (Unanimous)	5	3:00
1994-12-21	Loss	(Thailand) Samingnoi Sor.Thanikul	Rajadamnern Stadium	Bangkok, Thailand	Decision	5	3:00
Loses the Rajadamnern Stadium Featherweight (126 lbs) title.
1994-11-23	Loss	(Thailand) Samingnoi Sor.Thanikul	Rajadamnern Stadium	Bangkok, Thailand	Decision	5	3:00
1994-10-31	Loss	(Thailand) Prabseuk Sitsantat	Rajadamnern Stadium	Bangkok, Thailand	Decision	5	3:00
1994-09-07	Win	(Thailand) Chaidet Kiatchansing	Rajadamnern Stadium	Bangkok, Thailand	Decision	5	3:00
1994-07-27	Win	(Thailand) Chaidet Kiatchansing	Rajadamnern Stadium	Bangkok, Thailand	KO	3	
Wins the Rajadamnern Stadium Featherweight (126 lbs) title.
1994-06-27	Win	(Thailand) Prabseuk Sitsantat	Rajadamnern Stadium	Bangkok, Thailand	Decision	5	3:00
1994-06-08	Win	(Thailand) Muangfahlek Kiatwichian	Rajadamnern Stadium	Bangkok, Thailand	Decision	5	3:00
1994-04-27	Loss	(Thailand) Silapathai Jockygym	Rajadamnern Stadium	Bangkok, Thailand	Decision	5	3:00
Loses the Rajadamnern Stadium Super Bantamweight (122 lbs) title.
1994-03-30	Win	(Thailand) Paideang Lerksakgym	Rajadamnern Stadium	Bangkok, Thailand	Decision (Unanimous)	5	3:00
Wins the Rajadamnern Stadium Super Bantamweight (122 lbs) title.
1994-02-23	Loss	(Thailand) Wanghin Por.Chaiwat	Rajadamnern Stadium	Bangkok, Thailand	Decision	5	3:00
1994-01-26	Loss	(Thailand) Banluedet Lukprabat	Rajadamnern Stadium	Bangkok, Thailand	Decision	5	3:00
1993-12-22	Win	(Thailand) Singnoi Sor.Prasartporn	Rajadamnern Stadium	Bangkok, Thailand	Decision	5	3:00
1993-10-27	NC	(Thailand) Thaharn-ek Pichitman	Rajadamnern Stadium	Bangkok, Thailand	Thaharn-ek dismissed	5	
1993-09-29	Loss	(Thailand) Wanwiset Kaennorasing	Rajadamnern Stadium	Bangkok, Thailand	Decision	5	3:00
1993-07-31	Win	(Thailand) Kuekrit Sor.Nayaiam	Omnoi Stadium	Thailand	Decision	5	3:00
1993-06-23	Loss	(Thailand) Noppadet Sor.Rewadee	Rajadamnern Stadium	Bangkok, Thailand	Decision	5	3:00
1993-05-26	Win	(Thailand) Wanwiset Kaennorasing	Rajadamnern Stadium	Bangkok, Thailand	Decision	5	3:00
1993-04-28	Loss	(Thailand) Kanongmek Sitsei	Rajadamnern Stadium	Bangkok, Thailand	Decision	5	3:00
1993-03-23	Loss	(Thailand) Oley Kiatoneway	Lumpinee Stadium	Bangkok, Thailand	Decision	5	3:00
1993-01-26	Loss	(Thailand) Buakaw Por.Pisitchet	Rajadamnern Stadium	Bangkok, Thailand	Decision	5	3:00
1992-12-30	Loss	(Thailand) Boonlai Sor.Thanikul	Rajadamnern Stadium	Bangkok, Thailand	Decision	5	3:00
1992-12-05	Win	(Thailand) Oley Kiatoneway	Lumpinee Stadium, King's Birthday	Bangkok, Thailand	KO (Punches)	4	
1992-11-16	Loss	(Thailand) Pepsi Biyapan	Rajadamnern Stadium	Bangkok, Thailand	Decision	5	3:00
1992-10-20	Win	(Thailand) Pepsi Biyapan	Lumpinee Stadium	Bangkok, Thailand	Decision	5	3:00
1992-09-30	Win	(Thailand) Taweechai Wor.Preecha	Rajadamnern Stadium	Bangkok, Thailand	Decision	5	3:00
1992-08-28	Loss	(Thailand) Suwitlek Lukbangplasoi	Rajadamnern Stadium	Bangkok, Thailand	Decision	5	3:00
1992-08-04	Win	(Thailand) Kangwannoi Or.Sribualoi		Bangkok, Thailand	Decision	5	3:00
1992-06-02	Loss	(Thailand) Pepsi Biyapan	Rajadamnern Stadium	Bangkok, Thailand	Decision	5	3:00
1992-04-29	Win	(Thailand) Kanongmek Sitsiam	Rajadamnern Stadium	Bangkok, Thailand	Decision	5	3:00
1992-03-11	Win	(Thailand) Yodkhuntap Sitkrupat	Rajadamnern Stadium	Bangkok, Thailand	Decision	5	3:00
1992-01-27	Loss	(Thailand) Pimaranlek Sitaran	Rajadamnern Stadium	Bangkok, Thailand	Decision	5	3:00
1991-12-08	Win	(Thailand) Yodkhuntap Sitkrupatt	Rajadamnern Stadium	Bangkok, Thailand	Decision	5	3:00
1991-11-13	Loss	(Thailand) Yodkhuntap Sitkrupatt	Rajadamnern Stadium	Bangkok, Thailand	Decision	5	3:00
1991-09-28	Loss	(Thailand) Padejseuk Kiatsamran	Rajadamnern Stadium	Bangkok, Thailand	Decision	5	3:00
1991-08-28	Draw	(Thailand) Padejseuk Kiatsamran	Rajadamnern Stadium	Bangkok, Thailand	Decision	5	3:00
1991-07-20	Loss	(Thailand) Rajasak Sor.Vorapin	Crocodile Farm, Khaosai vs Griman	Samut Prakan, Thailand	Decision (Unanimous)	5	3:00
Loses the Rajadamnern Stadium Featherweight (126 lbs) title.
1991-06-26	Loss	(Thailand) Padphon Dejrittha	Rajadamnern Stadium	Bangkok, Thailand	Decision	5	3:00
1990-12-09	Win	(Thailand) Jack Kiatniwat		Phetchabun Province, Thailand	Decision	5	3:00
1990-11-30	Win	(Thailand) Sangtiennoi Sor.Rungroj	Rajadamnern Stadium	Bangkok, Thailand	Decision	5	3:00
1990-10-31	Win	(Thailand) Jack Kiatniwat	Rajadamnern Stadium	Bangkok, Thailand	Decision	5	3:00
Defends the Rajadamnern Stadium Featherweight (126 lbs) title.
1990-09-28	Win	(Japan) Takahiro Shimizu	AJKF INSPIRING WARS HEAT-928	Tokyo, Japan	Decision (Unanimous)	5	3:00
1990-05-30	Win	(Thailand) Sangtiennoi Sor.Rungroj	Rajadamnern Stadium	Bangkok, Thailand	Decision	5	3:00
1990-03-29	Win	(Thailand) Jack Kiatniwat	Rajadamnern Stadium	Bangkok, Thailand	Decision	5	3:00
Wins the Rajadamnern Stadium Featherweight (126 lbs) title.
1990-01-29	Loss	(Thailand) Jack Kiatniwat	Rajadamnern Stadium	Bangkok, Thailand	Decision	5	3:00
For the Rajadamnern Stadium Featherweight (126 lbs) title.
1989-12-06	Draw	(Thailand) Jack Kiatniwat	Rajadamnern Stadium	Bangkok, Thailand	Decision	5	3:00
1989-10-18	Win	(Thailand) Jack Kiatniwat	Rajadamnern Stadium	Bangkok, Thailand	Decision	5	3:00
1989-06-05	Win	(Thailand) Sangtiennoi Sor.Rungroj	Rajadamnern Stadium	Bangkok, Thailand	Decision	5	3:00
1989-04-24	Draw	(Thailand) Sangtiennoi Sor.Rungroj	Rajadamnern Stadium	Bangkok, Thailand	Decision	5	3:00
1989-02-22	Win	(Thailand) Wanpichit Kaennorasing	Rajadamnern Stadium	Bangkok, Thailand	Decision	5	3:00
Wins the vacant Rajadamnern Stadium Super Bantamweight (122 lbs) title.
1988-11-25	Win	(United States) Felipe Garcia		Las Vegas, United States	KO (Left High Kick)	3	
1988-10-11	Loss	(Thailand) Wangchannoi Sor Palangchai	Lumpinee Stadium	Bangkok, Thailand	Decision	5	3:00
1988-07-18	Loss	(Thailand) Jaroenthong Kiatbanchong	Rajadamnern Stadium	Bangkok, Thailand	Decision	5	3:00
1988-05-03	Win	(Thailand) Langsuan Panyuthaphum	Lumpinee Stadium	Bangkok, Thailand	Decision	5	3:00
1988-03-04	NC	(Thailand) Langsuan Panyuthaphum	Lumpinee Stadium	Bangkok, Thailand	in stadium incident	4	3:00
1987-10-27	Win	(Thailand) Manasak Sor Ploenchit	Rajadamnern Stadium	Bangkok, Thailand	Decision	5	3:00
1987-07-31	Win	(Thailand) Samransak Muangsurin	Lumpinee Stadium	Bangkok, Thailand	Decision	5	3:00
1987-05-19	Win	(Thailand) Chanchai Sor Tamarangsri	Lumpinee Stadium	Bangkok, Thailand	Decision	5	3:00
1987-03-31	Loss	(Thailand) Saencherng Pinsinchai	Lumpinee Stadium	Bangkok, Thailand	Decision	5	3:00
1986-11-11	Win	(Thailand) Sangtiennoi Sor.Rungroj	Lumpinee Stadium	Bangkok, Thailand	Decision	5	3:00
1986-08-11	Win	(Thailand) Jampatong Na Nontachai	Rajadamnern Stadium	Bangkok, Thailand	Decision	5	3:00
1986-06-12	Loss	(Thailand) Jampatong Na Nontachai	Rajadamnern Stadium	Bangkok, Thailand	KO (high kick)	2	
1985-10-24	Win	(Thailand) Manasak Sor Ploenchit	Rajadamnern Stadium	Bangkok, Thailand	Decision	5	3:00
1985-09-03	Win	(Thailand) Samransak Muangsurin	Lumpinee Stadium	Bangkok, Thailand	Decision	5	3:00
1985-07-26	Win	(Thailand) Maewnoi Sitchang	Lumpinee Stadium	Bangkok, Thailand	Decision	5	3:00
1985-05-13	Win	(Thailand) Boonam Sor.Jarunee	Wan Muay Thai Rajadamnern Stadium	Bangkok, Thailand	Decision	5	3:00
1984-11-20	Win	(Thailand) Chanchai Sor.Kiatdisak	Lumpinee Stadium	Bangkok, Thailand	Decision	5	3:00
1984-10-18	Loss	(Thailand) Phayanoi Sor.Thasanee	Lumpinee Stadium	Bangkok, Thailand	Decision	5	3:00
For the Lumpinee Stadium Super Flyweight (115 lbs) title.
1984-09-14	Win	(Thailand) Chanchai Sor.Kiatdisak	Lumpinee Stadium	Bangkok, Thailand	Decision	5	3:00
1984-07-10	Loss	(Thailand) Saencherng Naruepai	Lumpinee Stadium	Bangkok, Thailand	Decision	5	3:00
1984-04-10	Loss	(Thailand) Samransak Muangsurin	Lumpinee Stadium	Bangkok, Thailand	KO (Punches)	2	
1984-01-31	Loss	(Thailand) Kongtoranee Payakaroon	Lumpinee Stadium	Bangkok, Thailand	Decision	5	3:00
Loses the Lumpinee Stadium Bantamweight (118 lbs) title.
1983-11-11	Loss	(Thailand) Samart Payakaroon	Lumpinee Stadium	Bangkok, Thailand	Decision	5	3:00
1983-08-26	Win	(Thailand) Sornsilp Sitnoenpayom	Lumpinee Stadium	Bangkok, Thailand	Decision	5	3:00
Wins the Lumpinee Stadium Bantamweight (118 lbs) title.
1983-05-10	Win	(Thailand) Samransak Muangsurin	Lumpinee Stadium	Bangkok, Thailand	Decision	5	3:00
1983-03-05	Win	(Thailand) Mafuang Weerapol		Chiang Mai, Thailand	Decision	5	3:00
1982-12-24	Win	(Thailand) Phanmongkol Hor.Mahachai	Rajadamnern Stadium	Bangkok, Thailand	Decision	5	3:00
1982-11-15	Win	(Thailand) Piyarat Sor.Narongmit	Lumpinee Stadium	Bangkok, Thailand	Decision	5	3:00
1982-09-23	Win	(Thailand) Phanmongkol Hor.Mahachai	Rajadamnern Stadium	Bangkok, Thailand	Decision	5	3:00
1982-06-22	Win	(Thailand) Kongtoranee Payakaroon	Lumpinee Stadium	Bangkok, Thailand	Decision	5	3:00
Wins the Lumpinee Stadium Flyweight (112 lbs) title.
1982-05-10	Win	(Thailand) Fahkamram Sitpontep	Rajadamnern Stadium	Bangkok, Thailand	Decision	5	3:00
1982-03-12	Loss	(Thailand) Kongtoranee Payakaroon	Lumpinee Stadium	Bangkok, Thailand	Decision	5	3:00
For the Lumpinee Stadium Flyweight (112 lbs) title.
1982-02-09	Win	(Thailand) Wanmai Petchbandit	Lumpinee Stadium	Bangkok, Thailand	Decision	5	3:00
1982-01-15	Loss	(Thailand) Wanmai Petchbandit	Lumpinee Stadium	Bangkok, Thailand	Decision	5	3:00
1981-12-04	Win	(Thailand) Wisanupon Saksamut	Lumpinee Stadium	Bangkok, Thailand	Decision	5	3:00
1981-10-23	Win	(Thailand) Narak Sipkraysi	Lumpinee Stadium	Bangkok, Thailand	Decision	5	3:00
Wins vacant the Lumpinee Stadium Light Flyweight (108 lbs) title.
1981-09-04	Win	(Thailand) Wisanupon Saksamut	Lumpinee Stadium	Bangkok, Thailand	Decision	5	3:00
1981-07-23	Win	(Thailand) Lankrung Kiatkriankgrai	Rajadamnern Stadium	Bangkok, Thailand	Decision	5	3:00
Defends the Rajadamnern Stadium Mini Flyweight (105 lbs) title.
1981-03-25	Win	(Thailand) Lankrung Kiatkriankgrai	Rajadamnern Stadium	Bangkok, Thailand	Decision	5	3:00
1981-01-09	Loss	(Thailand) Ruengchai Thairungruang	Lumpinee Stadium	Bangkok, Thailand	Decision	5	3:00
Loses the Lumpinee Stadium Pinweight (102 lbs) title.
1980-12-02	Loss	(Thailand) Samart Payakaroon	Lumpinee Stadium	Bangkok, Thailand	Decision	5	3:00
1980-10-29	Win	(Thailand) Kiophit Chuwattana	Rajadamnern Stadium	Bangkok, Thailand	Decision	5	3:00
Wins the Rajadamnern Stadium Mini Flyweight (105 lbs) title.
1980-09-23	Win	(Thailand) Paruhatlek Sitchunthong	Lumpinee Stadium	Bangkok, Thailand	Decision	5	3:00
Defends the Lumpinee Stadium Pinweight (102 lbs) title.
1980-08-08	Win	(Thailand) Samart Payakaroon	Lumpinee Stadium	Bangkok, Thailand	Decision	5	3:00
Wins the Lumpinee Stadium Pinweight (102 lbs) title.
1980-06-28	Win	(Thailand) Paruhatlek Sitchunthong	Lumpinee Stadium	Bangkok, Thailand	Decision	5	3:00
1980-06-06	Win	(Thailand) Narak Sitkraisi		Bangkok, Thailand	Decision	5	3:00
1980-04-29	Win	(Thailand) Mekhha Worawut		Bangkok, Thailand	Decision	5	3:00
1980-02-22	Win	(Thailand) Banluesak Wor.Tangchitjaroen	Fairtex, Lumpinee Stadium	Bangkok, Thailand	Decision	5	3:00
1980-01-01	Loss	(Thailand) Banluesak Wor.Tangchitjaroen	Fairtex, Lumpinee Stadium	Bangkok, Thailand	Decision	5	3:00
1979-11-09	Win	(Thailand) Kiewannoi Kiatmonsawan	Lumpinee Stadium	Bangkok, Thailand	Decision	5	3:00
1978-11-05	Win	(Thailand) Cheernarong Singkongka	Rajadamnern Stadium	Bangkok, Thailand	Decision	5	3:00
Debut at Bangkok stadiums.
Legend: Win Loss Draw/No contest Notes

== Professional boxing record ==
11 fights	10 wins	1 loss
By knockout	6	0
By decision	4	1
Draws	0	

No.	Result	Record	Opponent	Type	Round	Date	Location	Notes
11	Loss	10–1	Kyoshiro Fukushima	PTS	10	May 19, 1999	Kumamoto, Japan	
10	Win	10–0	Yang Sun Park	KO	2	Aug 8, 1998	Ratchaburi, Thailand	Retained PABA Featherweight title
9	Win	9–0	Robby Rahangmetang	TKO	5	Apr 4, 1998	Bangkok, Thailand	Retained PABA Featherweight title
8	Win	8–0	Garry Garay	KO	7	Jan 18, 1998	Phetchaburi Province Stadium, Phetchaburi, Thailand	Retained PABA Featherweight title
7	Win	7–0	Serikzhan Yeshmagambetov	MD	12	Oct 23, 1997	Phraram 9 Plaza, Bangkok, Thailand	Retained PABA Featherweight title
6	Win	6–0	Selwyn Currie	TKO	11	Jul 24, 1997	Nonthaburi, Thailand	Won PABA Featherweight title
5	Win	5–0	Benjie Duran	TD	7	May 1, 1997	Rajadamnern Stadium, Bangkok, Thailand	
4	Win	4–0	Jun Aguilan	PTS	8	Mar 6, 1997	Yasothorn, Thailand	
3	Win	3–0	Jun Aguilan	KO	4	Dec 28, 1996	Mahachai Villa Arena, Samut Sakhon, Thailand	
2	Win	2–0	Erwin Gonzales	TKO	7	Aug 17, 1996	Saksit Restaurant, Bangkok, Thailand	
1	Win	1–0	Ulyses Puzon	PTS	10	Jul 6, 1996	National Stadium Gymnasium, Bangkok, Thailand	
