= Songchai Rattanasuban =

Thai boxer (born 1946)

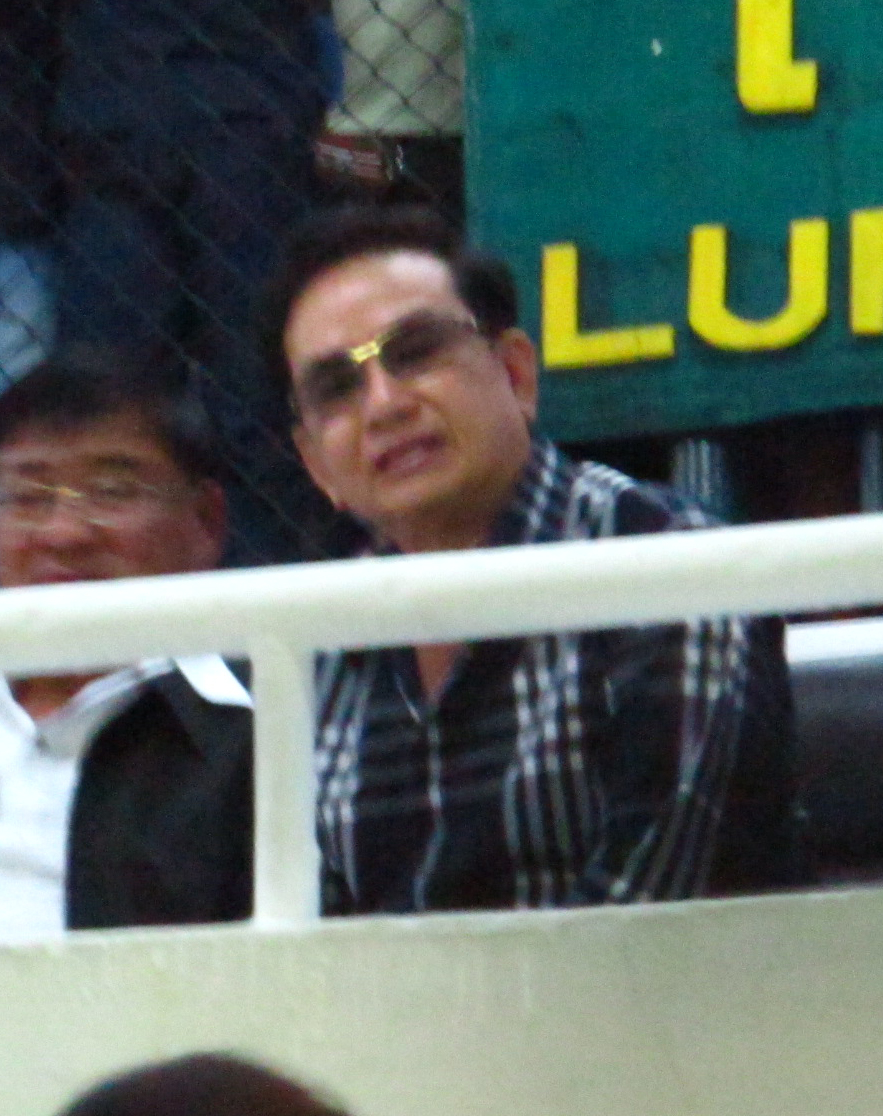
- Songchai Ratanasuban in late 2011 at Lumpinee Stadium
- Born: Songchai Rattanasuban; March 5, 1946 (age 80); Mueang Chachoengsao, Chachoengsao, Thailand
- Education: Ramkhamhaeng University
- Alma mater: Benchamaracharungsarit School; Chachoengsao Vocational College
- Occupations: Muay Thai and Professional boxing manager and promoter
- Years active: 1965–present
- Spouse: Saowanee Rattanasuban (née Tangkongpanich)
- Children: Pattaraporn Rattanasuban (daughter); Sirapob Rattanasuban (son); Pariyakorn "Oh" Ratanasuban (daughter)
- Relatives: Sakda Rattanasuban (older brother); Pariyakorn Ratanasuban (daughter)

Songchai Rattanasuban (Thai: ทรงชัย รัตนสุบรรณ; born: March 5, 1946 in Chachoengsao province) is a famous Thai Muay Thai and professional boxing promoter. He is well known for being a promoter of the fight dubbed "Suek Onesongchai" (ศึกวันทรงชัย; lit: "Songchai Day Battle") of Lumpinee Stadium especially in the 1980s and 1990s that have been recognized as the golden era of Muay Thai. He is the founder and CEO of Onesongchai Promotion, a Muay Thai and professional boxing promotion company based in Bangkok.

== Biography ==
He was born in Thai Chinese family at the Amphoe Mueang Chachoengsao, Chachoengsao province by the Bang Pakong River. He likes Muay Thai since childhood. He used to Mauy Thai along with his brother. He also competed at the Lumpinee Stadium in Bangkok but it appears that his record 22 times lose more than win.

Songchai started as a promoter in 1965, when he was only 18 years old, starting at his native. Which he held every month for 4 years until his reputation became known. In 1974, he became an assistant promoter at the Lumpinee Stadium until 1975, so he was appointed as a regular promoter.

In the 80's and 90's, he organized many fights and Muay Thai began to spread internationally until is known by all. There are many fighters under his promoted, such as Dieselnoi Chor Thanasukarn, Kongtoranee Payakaroon, Samart Payakaroon, Samransak Muangsurin, Langsuan Panyuthaphum, Chamuekpet Hapalang, Karuhat Sor.Supawan, Cherry Sor Wanich, Namphon Nongkeepahuyuth, Namkabuan Nongkeepahuyuth, Detduang Por.Pongsawang, Dokmaipa Por.Pongsawang, Toto Por.Pongsawang, Jareonthong Kiatbanchong, Nungubon Sitlerchai, Kaensak Sor.Ploenjit. He is also the initiator organized of foreign fighters against Thai fighters, such as Rob Kaman, or Ramon Dekkers.

In 1989, he made an important event when he was able to collect entrance fees for the fight between Pongsiri "Rambo" Por Ruamrudee vs. Pairojnoi "Bloody Steel" Sor Siamchai at the Lumpinee Stadium, which amounted to 3.2 million baht, the highest in history.

For the professional boxing he is also the promoter and manager of many boxers, and some of them to the level of the world champions, include Kongtoranee Payakaroon, Samart Payakaroon, Muangchai Kittikasem, Pichit Sitbangprachan, Saen Sor Ploenchit, Daorung Chuvatana, Yokthai Sithoar, Pichitnoi Sitbangprachan, Yodsanan Sor Nanthachai, Yoddamrong Sithyodthong, Pungluang Sor Singyu, Chonlatarn Piriyapinyo, Kwanpichit Onesongchaigym.

In 2001, he moved himself to be a regular promoter at Rajadamnern Stadium.

== Personal life ==
Songchai graduated junior high school from Benchamaracharungsarit School. Then graduated from vocational education from Chachoengsao Vocational College and graduated with a master's degree in Social Work from Ramkhamhaeng University in 1995.

He married Saowanee Rattanasuban (née Tangkongpanich). There are three children, Pattaraporn Rattanasuban, Sirapob Rattanasuban, Pariyakorn "Oh" Ratanasuban. Today, his last daughter, Pariyakorn is his major assistant.

== Boxing promoter live ==
Present

- List ศึกยอดมวยโลกวันทรงชัย ทางช่อง 7HD35 เวลา 15.00-17.00 น.

Former

- List ศึกวันทรงชัยททบ.5 ทุกวันเสาร์ เวลา 22.00 น. - 00.00 น. ทางช่อง 5HD1 (พ.ศ. 2537 - พ.ศ. 2543) (Broadcasting terminated)
- List ศึกวันทรงชัย 11 ทุกวันเสาร์ เวลา 14.00 น. - 16.00 น. ทางช่อง Channel 11 (พ.ศ. 2544 - พ.ศ. 2552) (Broadcasting terminated)
- List ศึกวันทรงชัยไอทีวี ทุกวันพฤหัสบดี เวลา 16.00 น. - 18.00 น. ทางช่อง ITV (พ.ศ. 2546 - พ.ศ. 2546) (Broadcasting terminated)
- List ศึกวันทรงชัยไลฟ์ทีวี ทุกวันเสาร์ เวลา 14.30 น. - 17.30 น. ทางช่อง Sports Plus (14 May 2011 - 29 October 2011) (Broadcasting terminated)
- List ศึกยอดมวยไทยรัฐ ทุกวันเสาร์ เวลา 14.00 น. - 16.00 น. ทางช่อง Thairath TV (32) (5 September 2015 - 30 December 2017) (Broadcasting terminated)
- List มวยไทยไฟต์ไนท์ ทุกวันเสาร์ เวลา 18.20-20.00 น. ทางช่อง PPTVHD36 (จัดแบบสัญจร) (เริ่มวันเสาร์ที่ 9 เมษายน 2559-วันเสาร์ที่ 31 ธันวาคม 2560) (Broadcasting terminated)
- List ศึกนวมทองคำ ทุกวันเสาร์ เวลา 13.30-15.00 น. ทางช่อง PPTVHD36 (จัดแบบสัญจร) (เริ่มวันเสาร์ที่ 5 สิงหาคม 2559 ถึงวันเริ่มวันเสาร์ที่ 15 เมษายน 2560) (Broadcasting terminated)
- List ศึกวันทรงชัย แชมป์มวยไทย ทุกวันเสาร์ เวลา 14.00 - 16.00 น. ทางช่อง NOW26 (เริ่มวันเสาร์ที่ 16 ธันวาคม-3 กุมภาพันธ์ 2561) (Broadcasting terminated)
- List มวยไทย 8 ทิศ ทุกวันเสาร์ เวลา 19.00 - 21.00 น. ทางช่อง Ch.8 (27) (เริ่มวันเสาร์ที่ 7 กันยายน - 21 กันยายน 2562) (Broadcasting terminated)
- List ศึกยอดมวยวันทรงชัย ทุกวันเสาร์ เวลา 14.40 - 16.40 น. ทางช่อง Thairath TV (32) (เริ่มวันเสาร์ที่ 11 พฤษภาคม พ.ศ. 2562 - 26 กันยายน พ.ศ. 2563) (งดการแข่งขันและถ่ายทอดสดตั้งแต่วันเสาร์ที่ 21 มีนาคม ถึงวันเสาร์ที่ 11 กรกฎาคม 2563 เนื่องจากCoronavirus disease 2019 (COVID-19) In Thailand โดยกลับมาแข่งขันและถ่ายทอดสดตั้งแต่วันเสาร์ที่ 18 กรกฎาคม 2563 เป็นต้นไป) (Broadcasting terminated)
