= Rajasak Sor.Vorapin =

Thai former professional Muay Thai fighter

- Born: Phusak Kerdrum; February 23, 1967 (age 59); Bang Krathum, Nang Rong, Buriram, Thailand
- Native name: สมบัติ เทพชาติ
- Other names: Ratchasak Sor.Worapin
- Nickname: Lord Khmer Knee (ขุนเข่าแขมร์)
- Height: 171 cm (5 ft 7 in)
- Division: Super Flyweight; Super Bantamweight; Featherweight
- Style: Muay Thai (Muay Khao)
- Stance: Orthodox
- Team: Sor.Vorapin Gym
- Trainer: Jitti Damriram
- Years active: c. 1981–2000

Other information
- Occupation: Muay Thai trainer

Phusak Kerdrum (Thai: สมบัติ เทพชาติ; born February 23, 1967), known professionally as Rajasak Sor.Vorapin (Thai: ราชศักดิ์ ส.วรพิน) is a Thai former professional Muay Thai fighter. He is a former three-division Rajadamnern Stadium champion who was famous during the 1980s and 1990s.

== Biography and career ==
Rajasak started fighting in Muay Thai at the age of 14. He was trained by his father at his home in the Buriram province and was competing in the neighbouring provinces of Surin, Ubon Ratchathani and Korat. In 1987 he moved to Bangkok to join the Sor.Vorapin Gym.

In 1989 he defeated Ekaphon Chuwattana to capture the Rajadamnern stadium 115 lbs title. Later the same year he was matched with Langsuan Panyuthaphum in a fight billed as a champion against champion matchup. He was defeated by decision but won the rematch less than a month later.

Rajasak became a successful fighter of the Bangkok circuit with his heavy knee style, he mostly fought for the promotor Klaew Thanikhul. During his career he won the Rajadamnern Stadium belt at three different weights and defeated notable fighters of his era such as Langsuan Panyuthaphum, Jaroenthong Kiatbanchong, Therdkiat Sitthepitak, Robert Kaennorasing or Chamuekpet Hapalang.

After his fighting career Rajsak became a trainer, first at his old camp the Sor Vorapin and later in various camps, among them the Emerald Gym, Petchprasit Gym, Jitti gym, Phetsithong and 7MuayThai Gym.

== Titles and accomplishments ==
- Rajadamnern Stadium
  - Rajadamnern Stadium Fighter of the Year
  - 1989 Rajadamnern Super Flyweight (115 lbs) Champion
  - 1990 Rajadamnern Super Bantamweight (122 lbs) Champion
    - One successful title defense
  - 1991 Rajadamnern Featherweight (126 lbs) Champion

== Fight record ==
Muay Thai record
Date	Result	Opponent	Event	Location	Method	Round	Time
2000-09-22	Draw	(Thailand) Lakhin Sakjawee	Rajadamnern Stadium	Bangkok, Thailand	Decision	5	3:00
1999-	Win	(France) Ahmed Lain		France	KO	1	
1999-	Loss	(France) Karim Saada		France	Decision	5	3:00
1995-09-04	Loss	(Thailand) Phanmongkol Carryboy	Rajadamnern Stadium	Bangkok, Thailand	Decision	5	3:00
1995-07-05	Loss	(Thailand) Prabpramlek Sitsantad	Rajadamnern Stadium	Bangkok, Thailand	Decision	5	3:00
1995-05-22	Loss	(Thailand) Phanmongkol Carryboy	Rajadamnern Stadium	Bangkok, Thailand	Decision	5	3:00
1995-02-01	Loss	(Thailand) Nuathoranee Wor.Taweekiat	Rajadamnern Stadium	Bangkok, Thailand	Decision	5	3:00
1994-12-	Win	(Thailand) Taweechai Wor.Preecha	Rajadamnern Stadium	Bangkok, Thailand	Decision	5	3:00
1994-11-11	Win	(Thailand) Jongrak Khaiadisorn	Rajadamnern Stadium	Bangkok, Thailand	Decision	5	3:00
1994-10-12	Win	(Thailand) Jongrak Khaiadisorn	Rajadamnern Stadium	Bangkok, Thailand	Decision	5	3:00
1994-09-07	Win	(Thailand) Taweechai Wor.Preecha	Rajadamnern Stadium	Bangkok, Thailand	Decision	5	3:00
1994-03-	Win	(Thailand) Samingnoi Sor.Thanikul	Rajadamnern Stadium	Bangkok, Thailand	Decision	5	3:00
1994-02-10	Loss	(Thailand) Phannarin Sor.Suwanpakdee	Rajadamnern Stadium	Bangkok, Thailand	Decision	5	3:00
1994-01-13	Win	(Thailand) Phannarin Sor.Suwanpakdee	Rajadamnern Stadium	Bangkok, Thailand	Decision	5	3:00
1993-11-10	Win	(Thailand) Neungsiam Kiatwichian	Rajadamnern Stadium	Bangkok, Thailand	Decision	5	3:00
1993-10-06	Win	(Thailand) Banluedet Lukprabat	Rajadamnern Stadium	Bangkok, Thailand	Decision	5	3:00
1993-03-25	Win	(Thailand) Palangphet	Rajadamnern Stadium	Bangkok, Thailand	Decision	5	3:00
1992-11-11		(Thailand) Jack Kiatniwat	Rajadamnern Stadium	Bangkok, Thailand			
1992-10-05	Win	(Thailand) Padphon Dejritta	Lumpinee Stadium	Bangkok, Thailand	Decision	5	3:00
1992-07-01	Loss	(Thailand) Suwitlek Lukbangplasoi	Lumpinee Stadium	Bangkok, Thailand	Decision	5	3:00
1992-06-19	Loss	(Thailand) Kangwannoi Or.Sribualoi	Lumpinee Stadium	Bangkok, Thailand	Decision	5	3:00
1992-03-25	Loss	(Thailand) Robert Kaennorasing	Rajadamnern Stadium	Bangkok, Thailand	Decision	5	3:00
For the Rajadamnern Featherweight (126 lbs) title.
1992-02-19	Loss	(Thailand) Noppadet Sor.Rewadee	Lumpinee Stadium	Bangkok, Thailand	Decision	5	3:00
1992-01-22	Loss	(Thailand) Kompetch Lukprabat	Lumpinee Stadium	Bangkok, Thailand	Decision	5	3:00
1991-12-18	Win	(Thailand) Neungsiam Kiatwichian	Rajadamnern Stadium	Bangkok, Thailand	Decision	5	3:00
1991-11-29	Loss	(Thailand) Neungsiam Kiatwichian	Rajadamnern Stadium	Bangkok, Thailand	Decision	5	3:00
1991-01-30	Win	(Thailand) Jack Kiatniwat	Rajadamnern Stadium	Bangkok, Thailand	Decision	5	3:00
1991-09-	Loss	(Thailand) Robert Kaennorasing	Rajadamnern Stadium	Bangkok, Thailand	Decision	5	3:00
1991-08-	Loss	(Thailand) Taweechai Wor.Preecha	Rajadamnern Stadium	Bangkok, Thailand	Decision	5	3:00
Loses the Rajadamnern Featherweight (126 lbs) title.
1991-07-20	Win	(Thailand) Chamuekpet Hapalang	Crocodile Farm	Samut Prakan, Thailand	Decision	5	3:00
Wins the Rajadamnern Featherweight (126 lbs) title.
1991-06-19	Win	(Thailand) Robert Kaennorasing	Rajadamnern Stadium	Bangkok, Thailand	Decision	5	3:00
1991-05-26	Win	(Thailand) Jack Kiatniwat	MAJKF	Tokyo, Japan	TKO (Doctor Stoppage)	1	2:26
1991-05-15	Loss	(Thailand) Patpon Detritta	Rajadamnern Stadium	Bangkok, Thailand	Decision	5	3:00
Loses the Rajadamnern Super Bantamweight (122 lbs) title.
1991-04-07	Win	(Thailand) Padejseuk Kiatsamran		Samut Sakhon, Thailand	Decision	5	3:00
1991-02-15	Loss	(Thailand) Therdkiat Sitthepitak		Phra Nakhon Si Ayutthaya, Thailand	Decision	5	3:00
1991-01-30	Loss	(Thailand) Jaroenthong Kiatbanchong	Rajadamnern Stadium	Bangkok, Thailand	Decision	5	3:00
1990-12-20	Win	(Thailand) Therdkiat Sitthepitak	Rajadamnern Stadium	Bangkok, Thailand	Decision	5	3:00
1990-11-29	Win	(Thailand) Neungsiam Kiatwichian	Rajadamnern Stadium	Bangkok, Thailand	Decision	5	3:00
Defends the Rajadamnern Super Bantamweight (122 lbs) title.
1990-11-05	Win	(Thailand) Taweechai Wor.Preecha	Rajadamnern Stadium	Bangkok, Thailand	Decision	5	3:00
1990-09-25	Loss	(Thailand) Jaroenthong Kiatbanchong	Lumpinee Stadium	Bangkok, Thailand	Decision	5	3:00
1990-08-15	Win	(Thailand) Jaroenthong Kiatbanchong	Rajadamnern Stadium	Bangkok, Thailand	Decision	5	3:00
1990-07-09	Win	(Thailand) Padejseuk Kiatsamran	Rajadamnern Stadium	Bangkok, Thailand	Decision	5	3:00
Wins the vacant Rajadamnern Super Bantamweight (122 lbs) title.
1990-06-14	Win	(Thailand) Chanalert Muanghatyai		Bangkok, Thailand	Decision	5	3:00
1990-05-10	Loss	(Thailand) Chanalert Muanghatyai	Rajadamnern Stadium	Bangkok, Thailand	Decision	5	3:00
1990-04-25	Loss	(Thailand) Chanalert Muanghatyai	Rajadamnern Stadium	Bangkok, Thailand	Decision	5	3:00
For the Rajadamnern Bantamweight (118 lbs) title.
1990-02-22	Win	(Thailand) Padejseuk Kiatsamran	Rajadamnern Stadium	Bangkok, Thailand	Decision	5	3:00
1990-01-04	Win	(Thailand) Mahaheng Tor.Boonlert	Rajadamnern Stadium	Bangkok, Thailand	Decision	5	3:00
1989-11-27	Win	(Thailand) Langsuan Panyuthaphum	Rajadamnern Stadium	Bangkok, Thailand	Decision	5	3:00
1989-11-02	Loss	(Thailand) Langsuan Panyuthaphum	Rajadamnern Stadium, Lumpinee vs Rajadamnern champion	Bangkok, Thailand	Decision	5	3:00
1989-09-25	Win	(Thailand) Dennuea Denmolee	Rajadamnern Stadium	Bangkok, Thailand	Decision	5	3:00
1989-07-13	Win	(Thailand) Ekaphon Chuwattana	Rajadamnern Stadium	Bangkok, Thailand	Decision	5	3:00
Wins the vacant Rajadamnern Super Flyweight (115 lbs) title.
1989-06-15	Draw	(Thailand) Ekaphon Chuwattana	Rajadamnern Stadium	Bangkok, Thailand	Decision	5	3:00
For the vacant Rajadamnern Super Flyweight (115 lbs) title.
1989-04-27	Win	(Thailand) Saenphet Chor.Waikul	Rajadamnern Stadium	Bangkok, Thailand	Decision	5	3:00
1989-04-10	Win	(Thailand) Samernoi Tor.Boonlert	Rajadamnern Stadium	Bangkok, Thailand	Decision	5	3:00
1989-03-23	Win	(Thailand) Lom-Isannoi Sor.Thanikul	Rajadamnern Stadium	Bangkok, Thailand	Decision	5	3:00
1989-01-25	Loss	(Thailand) Samernoi Tor.Boonlert	Rajadamnern Stadium	Bangkok, Thailand	Decision	5	3:00
1988-12-22	Loss	(Thailand) Waifai Prapatmotor	Rajadamnern Stadium	Bangkok, Thailand	Decision	5	3:00
1988-10-19	Win	(Thailand) Toiting Kiatphetnoi	Rajadamnern Stadium	Bangkok, Thailand	Decision	5	3:00
1988-06-30	Win	(Thailand) Yodkunthap Sikrupat	Rajadamnern Stadium	Bangkok, Thailand	Decision	5	3:00
1988-	Draw	(Thailand) Yodkunthap Sikrupat	Rajadamnern Stadium	Bangkok, Thailand	Decision	5	3:00
1988-	Win	(Thailand) Senrak Lukprabat	Rajadamnern Stadium	Bangkok, Thailand	Decision	5	3:00
1988-	Win	(Thailand) Nampetch Moisayon	Rajadamnern Stadium	Bangkok, Thailand	Decision	5	3:00
1988-02-29	Win	(Thailand) Den Yuthakit	Rajadamnern Stadium	Bangkok, Thailand	Decision	5	3:00
1988-02-10	Win	(Thailand) Kukai Kaisingprum	Rajadamnern Stadium	Bangkok, Thailand	Decision	5	3:00
1988-01-13	Win	(Thailand) Sameulek Sor.Pariya	Rajadamnern Stadium	Bangkok, Thailand	Decision	5	3:00
1987-	Loss	(Thailand) Chokchai Majestic	Rajadamnern Stadium	Bangkok, Thailand	Decision	5	3:00
1987-	Win	(Thailand) Saphaynoi Por.Chaiwan	Rajadamnern Stadium	Bangkok, Thailand	Decision	5	3:00
1987-	Win	(Thailand) Noppadet Lukprabat	Rajadamnern Stadium	Bangkok, Thailand	Decision	5	3:00
1987-	Win	(Thailand) Boonsom Bualuang-Prakanpay	Rajadamnern Stadium	Bangkok, Thailand	Decision	5	3:00
1987-	Win	(Thailand) Sorakom Kiatisrirang	Rajadamnern Stadium	Bangkok, Thailand	Decision	5	3:00
1987-	Win	(Thailand) Yodmangson Sitmuangthong	Rajadamnern Stadium	Bangkok, Thailand	KO		
Legend: Win Loss Draw/No contest Notes
