= Jaroenthong Kiatbanchong =

Thai former professional Muay Thai fighter and amateur boxer

- Born: Jaroen Chumanee; June 11, 1968 (age 58); Tambon Thung Yai, Thung Yai, Nakhon Si Thammarat, Thailand
- Native name: เจริญ ชูมณี
- Other names: Jaroenthong Kaiyanghadaogym (เจริญทอง ไก่ย่างห้าดาวยิม)
- Nickname: Fierce Tiger of the South (พยัคฆ์ร้ายเมืองใต้); Kru Ped (ครูเป็ด)
- Height: 172 cm (5 ft 8 in)
- Division: Super Flyweight; Featherweight; Lightweight; Super Lightweight
- Style: Muay Thai (Muay Femur); Boxing
- Stance: Southpaw
- Team: Kiatbanchong Gym; Chuchok "Mai Muangkhon" Chukaewruang
- Years active: c. 1980–1994

Kickboxing record
- Total: 153
- Wins: 120
- Losses: 30
- Draws: 2
- No contests: 1

Other information
- University: Chandrakasem Rajabhat College (currently Chandrakasem Rajabhat University)
- Notable relatives: Chalamthong Kiatbanchong (older brother); Samranthong Kiatbanchong (younger brother)
- Notable school: Wimutayaram Pittayakorn School

Jaroen Chumane (Thai: เจริญ ชูมณี; born June 11, 1968), known professionally as Jaroenthong Kiatbanchong (Thai: เจริญทอง เกียรติบ้านช่อง), is a Thai former professional Muay Thai fighter and amateur boxer. He is a former three-time Lumpinee Stadium champion across two divisions who was famous during the 1980s and 1990s.

== Biography & career ==
Jaroen Chumane (nicknamed: Ped; เป็ด; lit: "Duck") was born on June 11, 1968 in the village of Thung Yai in the province of Nakhon Si Thammarat in southern Thailand. He was the seventh of nine children including Chalamthong Kiatbanchong (older brother) and Samranthong Kiatbanchong (younger brother) who also grew up to be notable fighters.

He'd be introduced to Muay Thai by his older brother at 12 years old and win his first fight shortly after to earn 100 baht. Later when he grew up, he came to Bangkok to study at the secondary level at Wimutayaram Pittayakorn School in the Bang Phlat neighbourhood. He became a fighter at the camp "Kiatbanchong" which is owned by Chuchok "Mai Muangkhon" Chukaewruang, a fellow southerner.

He regularly fought at Lumpinee Stadium under the famous promoter Songchai Rattanasuban's stable where he'd win a title once at Super Flyweight and twice at Featherweight. He faced many elite fighters of his era including Samart Payakaroon, Chamuekpet Hapalang, Panomtuanlek Hapalang, Wangchannoi Sor.Palangchai, Samransak Muangsurin, Saencherng Pinsinchai, Langsuan Panyuthaphum, Cherry Sor.Wanich, Paruhatlek Sitchunthong, Therdkiat Sitthepitak, Namkabuan Nongkeepahuyuth, Manasak Sor.Ploenchit, Chanchai Sor.Tamarangsri, Petchdam Lukborai, Namphon Nongkeepahuyuth, Superlek Sorn E-Sarn, and the Dutch legendary Ramon Dekkers. He earned a career-high purse of 250,000 baht in his fight with Saencheng Pinsinchai which made him one of the highest paid fighters of his era.

In 1989, he reached his career's peak. He faced Samart Payakaroon, his favorite senior fighter, who had recently returned to Muay Thai after losing his WBC Super bantamweight world title. In the fight to prove who the real top fighters was of the era. As a result, he was knocked out by a right hook in the first round but still that was the fight he was most proud of.

In addition, he also competed in amateur boxing match achieving a gold medal at the XXVI Thailand National Games in Surat Thani and a bronze medal in the King's Cup. He also joined the national team to compete in the 1990 Asian Games in Beijing, China.

After retiremimg, he is a trainer and owns his own Muay Thai gym in the name "Jaroenthong Muay Thai School" in Wang Thonglang District, Bangkok.

In 2013, he returned to Muay Thai again at age 44, he competed in the 2013 Toyota Marathon Tournament in Kanchanaburi province. He won two times before losing to a young Iranian fighter Vahid Shahbazi in the finals.

Besides his fighting career, with a good-looking man and famous. He has been photographed in various magazines, including television dramas and movies. In 2010, he co-starred in the historical film Yamada: The Samurai of Ayothaya with many fellow fighters such as Saenchai Sor. Kingstar, Buakaw Por. Pramuk, Anuwat Kaewsamrit, Yodsanklai Fairtex and Somjit Jongjohor.

== Titles ==
=== Muay Thai ===
- Lumpinee Stadium
  - 1987 Lumpinee Stadium Super Flyweight (115 lbs) Champion
  - 1988 Lumpinee Stadium Featherweight (126 lbs) Champion
  - 1991 Lumpinee Stadium Featherweight (126 lbs) Champion
- World Muaythai Council
  - 1990 WMC World Lightweight (135 lbs) Champion
    - Two successful title defenses
  - 1993 WMC World Super Lightweight (140 lbs) Champion
- Awards
  - 1989 Sports Writers Association of Thailand Fight of the Year (vs Cherry Sor.Wanich)

=== Amateur Boxing ===
- Gold Medal XXVI Thailand National Games (1993)
- Bronze Medal in the King's Cup

== Fight record ==
Muay Thai Record (Incomplete)
120 Wins, 30 Losses, 2 Draws, 1NC
Date	Result	Opponent	Event	Location	Method	Round	Time
2013-05-31	Loss	(Iran) Vahid Shahbzai	Toyota Marathon, Final	Kanchanaburi, Thailand	Decision	3	3:00
2013-05-31	Win	(Japan) Yukiya Nakamura	Toyota Marathon, Semi Final	Kanchanaburi, Thailand	Decision	3	3:00
2000-09-09	Win	(United States) Melchor Menor	Warriors Cup of America	Irvine, California, United States	Decision	5	3:00
?	Loss	(Thailand) Theerapong Sit Korayuth	Lumpinee Stadium	Bangkok, Thailand	TKO (Punch)	3	3:00
1994-03-14	Loss	(Thailand) Orono Por.MuangUbon	Rajadamnern Stadium	Bangkok, Thailand	Decision	5	3:00
1994-01-31	Loss	(Thailand) Taweechai Wor.Preecha	Rajadamnern Stadium	Bangkok, Thailand	Decision	5	3:00
1994-01-14	Loss	(Thailand) Superlek Sornisaan	Lumpinee Stadium	Bangkok, Thailand	Decision	5	3:00
1993-12-04	Win	(Netherlands) Ramon Dekkers	Royal Thai Navy Academy temporary stadium	Samut Prakan, Thailand	Decision (majority)	5	3:00
Wins the WMC World Super Lightweight (140 lbs) title.
1993-07-11	Loss	(Thailand) Klaasuek Tor.Wittaya	IBF - Pichit Sitbangprachan vs Kyung-Yung Lee	Nakhon Sawan, Thailand	Decision	5	3:00
1993-06-11	Win	(Thailand) Petchdam Sor.Bodin	Lumpinee Stadium	Bangkok, Thailand	Decision	5	3:00
1992-11-13	NC	(Thailand) Chandet Sor.Prantalay	Lumpinee Stadium	Bangkok, Thailand	no contest (Referee stop)		
Referee asked Jaroenthong to leave the ring as he estimated he wasn't fighting up to his abilities.
1992-10-23	Win	(Thailand) Chanchai Sor.Tamarangsri		Bangkok, Thailand	Decision	5	3:00
1992-09-25	Loss	(Thailand) Cherry Sor.Wanich	Lumpinee Stadium	Bangkok, Thailand	Decision	5	3:00
1992-07-27	Win	(Thailand) Taweechai Wor.Preecha	Rajadamnern Stadium	Bangkok, Thailand	Decision	5	3:00
1992-06-13	Win	(Thailand) Orono Por.MuangUbon	Lumpinee Stadium	Bangkok, Thailand	Decision	5	3:00
1992-04-17	Loss	(Thailand) Jongsanan Fairtex	Lumpinee Stadium	Bangkok, Thailand	Decision	5	3:00
1992-02-28	Win	(Thailand) Sanit Wichitkriengkrai		Samut Prakan, Thailand	Decision	5	3:00
1991-11-03	Win	(Thailand) Superlek Chor.Sawat	Onesongchai	New Zealand	Decision	5	3:00
1991-08-14	Loss	(Thailand) Namphon Nongkeepahuyuth	Rajadamnern Stadium	Bangkok, Thailand	Decision	5	3:00
1991-07-02	Loss	(Thailand) Wangchannoi Sor.Palangchai	Lumpinee Stadium	Bangkok, Thailand	Decision	5	3:00
1991-06-14	Win	(Thailand) Therdkiat Sitthepitak	Lumpinee Stadium	Bangkok, Thailand	Decision	5	3:00
Wins the Lumpinee Stadium Featherweight (126 lbs) title.
1991-03-29	Loss	(Thailand) Namkabuan Nongkeepahuyuth	Lumpinee Stadium	Bangkok, Thailand	Decision	5	3:00
1991-03-05	Loss	(Thailand) Nuathoranee Thongracha	Lumpinee Stadium	Bangkok, Thailand	Decision	5	3:00
1991-02-15	Loss	(Thailand) Namkabuan Nongkeepahuyuth	Lumpinee Stadium	Bangkok, Thailand	Decision	5	3:00
1991-01-30	Win	(Thailand) Rajasak Sor.Vorapin	Rajadamnern Stadium	Bangkok, Thailand	Decision	5	3:00
1991-01-04	Win	(Thailand) Panomrunglek Chor.Sawat	Lumpinee Stadium	Bangkok, Thailand	Decision	5	3:00
1990-12-15	Win	(England) Bobby Becker	MAJKF	Tokyo, Japan	KO	2	2:22
1990-11-27	Loss	(Thailand) Therdkiat Sitthepitak	Lumpinee Stadium	Bangkok, Thailand	Decision	5	3:00
1990-10-07	Win	(Thailand) Namphon Nongkeepahuyuth	OneSongchai	New Zealand	Decision	5	3:00
Defends the WMC World Lightweight (135 lbs) title.
1990-09-25	Win	(Thailand) Rajasak Sor.Vorapin	Lumpinee Stadium	Bangkok, Thailand	Decision	5	3:00
1990-08-15	Loss	(Thailand) Rajasak Sor.Vorapin	Rajadamnern Stadium	Bangkok, Thailand	Decision	5	3:00
1990-07-29	Loss	(Thailand) Cherry Sor.Wanich		Arizona, United States	Decision	5	3:00
1990-06-29	Draw	(Thailand) Cherry Sor.Wanich	Lumpinee Stadium	Bangkok, Thailand	Decision	5	3:00
1990-06-08	Win	(Thailand) Petchdam Lukborai	Lumpinee Stadium	Bangkok, Thailand	Decision	5	3:00
1990-04-24	Win	(Thailand) Therdkiat Sitthepitak	Lumpinee Stadium	Bangkok, Thailand	Decision	5	3:00
1990-03-06	Loss	(Thailand) Superlek Sornisaan	Lumpinee Stadium	Bangkok, Thailand	TKO	3	
1990-02-18	Win	(Netherlands) Tommy Van Der Berg		Amsterdam, Netherlands	Decision	5	3:00
Defends the WMC World Lightweight (135 lbs) title.
1990-02-06	Loss	(Thailand) Petchdam Lukborai	Lumpinee Stadium	Bangkok, Thailand	Decision	5	3:00
For a 1 million baht side-bet.
1990-01-19	Win	(Thailand) Petchdam Lukborai	Lumpinee Stadium	Bangkok, Thailand	Decision	5	3:00
1989-12-31	Win	(Netherlands) Andre Masseur	Georges Carpentier Hall	Paris, France	KO (Left high kick)	3	
Wins the WMC World Lightweight (135 lbs) title.
1989-11-28	Win	(Thailand) Petchdam Lukborai	Lumpinee Stadium	Bangkok, Thailand	Decision	5	3:00
1989-11-08	Loss	(Thailand) Petchdam Lukborai	Lumpinee Stadium	Bangkok, Thailand	Decision	5	3:00
For a 1.8 million baht side-bet.
1989-10-23	Win	(Thailand) Sombat Sor.Thanikul		Koh Samui, Thailand	KO	4	
1989-10-06	Loss	(Thailand) Namphon Nongkeepahuyuth	Lumpinee Stadium	Bangkok, Thailand	Decision	5	3:00
For the Lumpinee Stadium Featherweight (126 lbs) title.
1989-08-29	Loss	(Thailand) Saencherng Pinsinchai	Lumpinee Stadium	Bangkok, Thailand	Decision	5	3:00
1989-08-15	Win	(Thailand) Cherry Sor.Wanich	Lumpinee Stadium	Bangkok, Thailand	Decision	5	3:00
1989-07-25	Win	(Thailand) Noppadet Sor.Rewadee	Lumpinee Stadium	Bangkok, Thailand	Decision	5	3:00
1989-06-03	Loss	(Thailand) Manasak Sor.Ploenchit		Trang Province, Thailand	TKO	3	
1989-05-02	Win	(Thailand) Petchdam Lukborai	Lumpinee Stadium	Bangkok, Thailand	Decision	5	3:00
1989-04-07	Win	(Thailand) Namphon Nongkeepahuyuth	Lumpinee Stadium	Bangkok, Thailand	TKO	3	
1989-03-10	Loss	(Thailand) Namphon Nongkeepahuyuth	Lumpinee Stadium	Bangkok, Thailand	Decision	5	3:00
Loses the Lumpinee Stadium Featherweight (126 lbs) title.
1989-01-06	Loss	(Thailand) Samart Payakaroon	Lumpinee Stadium	Bangkok, Thailand	KO (Right hook)	1	
1988-11-25	Win	(Thailand) Samransak Muangsurin	Lumpinee Stadium	Bangkok, Thailand	Decision	5	3:00
Wins the Lumpinee Stadium Featherweight (126 lbs) title.
1988-10-11	Loss	(Thailand) Samransak Muangsurin	Lumpinee Stadium	Bangkok, Thailand	Decision	5	3:00
1988-08-30	Win	(Thailand) Panomtuanlek Hapalang	Lumpinee Stadium	Bangkok, Thailand	Decision	5	3:00
1988-07-18	Win	(Thailand) Chamuekpet Hapalang	Rajadamnern Stadium	Bangkok, Thailand	Decision	5	3:00
1988-06-10	Win	(Thailand) Langsuan Panyuthaphum	Lumpinee Stadium	Bangkok, Thailand	Decision	5	3:00
1988-05-17	Loss	(Thailand) Yodpetch Sor.Jitpattana	Lumpinee Stadium	Bangkok, Thailand	Decision	5	3:00
1988-04-08	Win	(Thailand) Mono Singkaosen		Hat Yai, Thailand	Decision	5	3:00
1988-03-31	Win	(Thailand) Panrit Looksriraj	Rajadamnern Stadium	Bangkok, Thailand	Decision	5	3:00
1988-02-24	Loss	(Thailand) Panrit Looksriraj	Rajadamnern Stadium	Bangkok, Thailand	Decision	5	3:00
1988-01-26	Loss	(Thailand) Wisanupon Saksamut	Lumpinee Stadium	Bangkok, Thailand	Decision	5	3:00
Loses the Lumpinee Stadium Super Flyweight (115 lbs) title.
1987-12-29	Win	(Thailand) Phayanoi Sor.Thasanee	Lumpinee Stadium	Bangkok, Thailand	Decision	5	3:00
Wins the Lumpinee Stadium Super Flyweight (115 lbs) title.
1987-10-19	Win	(Thailand) Paruhatlek Sitchunthong	Lumpinee Stadium	Bangkok, Thailand	Decision	5	3:00
1987-08-28	Win	(Thailand) Dennuea Denmolee		Bangkok, Thailand	Decision	5	3:00
1987-07-24	Loss	(Thailand) Wangchannoi Sor.Palangchai		Bangkok, Thailand	KO	2	
1987-06-17	Draw	(Thailand) Namphon Nongkeepahuyuth	Lumpinee Stadium	Bangkok, Thailand	Decision	5	3:00
1987-04-16	Loss	(Thailand) Yodpetch Sor.Jitpattana	Lumpinee Stadium	Bangkok, Thailand	Decision	5	3:00
1987-03-26	Win	(Thailand) Namphon Nongkeepahuyuth	Lumpinee Stadium	Bangkok, Thailand	Decision	5	3:00
Wins the 200,000 baht side-bet.
1987-02-11	Win	(Thailand) Khaopho Sit Chanyut	Lumpinee Stadium	Bangkok, Thailand	Decision	5	3:00
1986-09-22		(Thailand) Phetsiam Kiatsingnoi	Rajadamnern Stadium	Bangkok, Thailand			
1986-07-30	Win	(Thailand) Dokmaipa Por.Pongsawang	Lumpinee Stadium	Bangkok, Thailand	Decision	5	3:00
1986-06-09	Win	(Thailand) Fahnoi Majestic	Rajadamnern Stadium	Bangkok, Thailand	Decision	5	3:00
1986-05-23	Win	(Thailand) Boonmee Sitsuchon	Lumpinee Stadium	Bangkok, Thailand	Decision	5	3:00
1985-05-09	Loss	(Thailand) Niwet Sor Sawat	Lumpinee Stadium	Bangkok, Thailand	Decision	5	3:00
1985-04-06	Win	(Thailand) Kompayak Saklamphu	Ruenrudee Boxing Stadium	Nakhon Si Thamnarat, Thailand	Decision	5	3:00
1984-12-13	Loss	(Thailand) Petchkasem Yuthakit	Rajadamnern Stadium	Bangkok, Thailand	Decision	5	3:00
Legend: Win Loss Draw/No contest Notes
