= Robert Kaennorasing =

Thai Muay Thai fighter

- Born: Pinit Somphet; April 29, 1972; Khon Kaen Province, Thailand
- Native name: พินิจ สมเพชร
- Other names: Adisak Kaennorasing; Robert Kor.Bangkruai (โรเบิร์ต ก.บางกรวย)
- Nickname: The Plucker (จอมถอน)
- Height: 174 cm (5 ft 9 in)
- Division: Mini Flyweight; Super Bantamweight Featherweight; Super Featherweight
- Style: Muay Thai (Femur)
- Stance: Southpaw
- Team: Kaennorasing Gym (1984–1987); Jocky Gym (1987-2004)
- Years active: c. 1984-1997; 2000-2004

Other information
- Occupation: Muay Thai fighter (retired); Muay Thai trainer

Pinit Somphet (Thai: พินิจ สมเพชร; born April 29, 1972), known professionally as Robert Kaennorasing (Thai: โรเบิร์ต แก่นนรสิงห์), is a Thai retired Muay Thai fighter. He is a three-division Rajadamnern Stadium champion and Isuzu Cup winner who was famous during the 1990s.

== Biography & career ==
Robert was born in a small village to the city of Khon Kaen in the province of Isan. In his village he started Muay Thai when he was 12 years old with his younger brother Rolex at the Kaennorasing gym, alongside other future champions such as Wanwiset and Wanpichit Kaennorasing. Fighting under the name "Adisak Kaennorasing" Robert had around 70 fights for the Kaennorasing gym before moving to Jockygym in Bangkok's Bang Pho area at the age of 15.

After his retirement, Robert became a trainer at Jocky gym which later became Skarbowsky gym.

== Titles & honours ==
- Rajadamnern Stadium
  - 1989 Rajadamnern Stadium Mini Flyweight (105 lbs) Champion
  - 1991 Rajadamnern Stadium Featherweight (126 lbs) Champion
    - Four successful title defenses
  - 1993 Rajadamnern Stadium Super Featherweight (130 lbs) Champion
    - Two successful title defenses
- Isuzu Cup
  - 1991 2nd Isuzu Cup Tournament Winner
- Awards
  - 1992 Sports Writers Association of Thailand Fight of the Year (vs Namkabuan Nongkeepahuyuth)
  - 2000 Sports Writers Association of Thailand Fight of the Year (vs Jean-Charles Skarbowsky)

== Fight record ==
Muay Thai Record (Incomplete)
140 Wins, 32 Losses, 5 Draws
Date	Result	Opponent	Event	Location	Method	Round	Time
2004-08-28	Loss	(New Zealand) Shane Chapman	Philip Lam Promotion	Wellington, New Zealand	Decision	5	3:00
2001-09-15	Loss	(China) Liu Hailong	Chinese Kung Fu vs Muaythai	Guangzhou, China	Decision	5	3:00
2001-06-03	Win	(Philippines) Melchor Menor	Warriors Cup 3	Burbank, California, USA	Decision (Unanimous)	5	3:00
2000-12-05	Win	(France) Jean-Charles Skarbowsky	King's Birthday	Bangkok, Thailand	Decision	5	3:00
2000-06-08	Loss	(France) Jean-Charles Skarbowsky	Muay Thai in Las Vegas, The Venetian	Paradise, United States	KO (Left uppercut)	1	2:23
For the I.S.K.A. Muay Thai (65 kg) World title.
2000-02-13	Win	(Japan) Takeshi Oshiro	KASSHIN	Japan	TKO (Referee Stoppage)	2	2:18
1998-12-05	Win	(Netherlands) Gerald Mamadeus	King's Birthday	Bangkok, Thailand	Decision	5	3:00
1997-04-12	Loss	(Thailand) Suwitlek Sor Sakowarat	Omnoi Stadium	Samut Sakhon, Thailand	Decision	5	3:00
1997-02-18	Win	(Thailand) Tappaya Sit-Or	Channel 7 Stadium	Bangkok, Thailand	Decision	5	3:00
1996-10-27	Win	(Thailand) Tappaya Sit-Or	Channel 7 Stadium	Bangkok, Thailand	Decision	5	3:00
1996-03-06	Win	(Thailand) Pairot Wor.Wolapon	Rajadamnern Stadium	Bangkok, Thailand	Decision	5	3:00
1995-06-14	Win	(Thailand) Panmongkol Carryboy	Rajadamnern Stadium	Bangkok, Thailand	Decision	5	3:00
1995-05-11	Win	(Thailand) Tepparit Por Tawatchai	Rajadamnern Stadium	Bangkok, Thailand	Decision	5	3:00
1994-06-18	Loss	(Thailand) Jongsanan Fairtex	Lumpinee Stadium	Bangkok, Thailand	KO (Punches)	1	
1994-05-03	Loss	(Thailand) Namkabuan Nongkeepahuyuth	Lumpinee Stadium	Bangkok, Thailand	Decision	5	3:00
1993-11-29	Loss	(Thailand) Therdkiat Sitthepitak	Rajadamnern Stadium	Bangkok, Thailand	Decision	5	3:00
1993-11-10	Win	(Thailand) Jongrak Lukprabaht	Rajadamnern Stadium	Bangkok, Thailand	Decision	5	3:00
Defends Rajadamnern Stadium Super Featherweight (130 lbs) title.
1993-10-06	Draw	(Thailand) Jongrak Lukprabaht	Rajadamnern Stadium	Bangkok, Thailand	Decision	5	3:00
Defends Rajadamnern Stadium Super Featherweight (130 lbs) title.
1993-08-08	Win	(Netherlands) Gilbert Ballantine		Shang Zen, China	Decision	5	3:00
1993-07-21	Win	(Thailand) Jongrak Lukprabaht	Rajadamnern Stadium	Bangkok, Thailand	Decision	5	3:00
Wins Rajadamnern Stadium Super Featherweight (130 lbs) title.
1993-06-09	Loss	(Thailand) Komphet Lookprabat	Rajadamnern Stadium	Bangkok, Thailand	Decision	5	3:00
1993-02-26	Loss	(Thailand) Therdkiat Sitthepitak	Lumpinee Stadium	Bangkok, Thailand	Decision	5	3:00
1992-12-23	Win	(Thailand) Namkabuan Nongkeepahuyuth	Rajadamnern Stadium	Bangkok, Thailand	Decision	5	3:00
1992-11-16	Win	(Thailand) Buakaw Por.Pisichet	Rajadamnern Stadium	Bangkok, Thailand	Decision	5	3:00
Defends Rajadamnern Stadium Featherweight (126 lbs) title.
1992-09-18	Win	(Thailand) Pepsi Biyapan	Rajadamnern Stadium	Bangkok, Thailand	Decision	5	3:00
1992-	Win	(Thailand) Jack Kiatniwat	Rajadamnern Stadium	Bangkok, Thailand	Decision	5	3:00
Defends Rajadamnern Stadium Featherweight (126 lbs) title.
1992-04-	Win	(Thailand) Komphet Lookprabat	Rajadamnern Stadium	Bangkok, Thailand	Decision	5	3:00
1992-03-25	Win	(Thailand) Rajasak Sor.Vorapin	Rajadamnern Stadium	Bangkok, Thailand	Decision	5	3:00
Defends Rajadamnern Stadium Featherweight (126 lbs) title.
1992-02-	Loss	(Thailand) Komphet Lookprabat	Rajadamnern Stadium	Bangkok, Thailand	Decision	5	3:00
1992-01-29	Win	(Thailand) Padejseuk Kiatsamran	Rajadamnern Stadium	Bangkok, Thailand	KO	2	
Defends Rajadamnern Stadium Featherweight (126 lbs) title.
1991-11-25	Win	(Thailand) Taweechai Wor.Preecha	Rajadamnern Stadium	Bangkok, Thailand	Decision	5	3:00
Wins Rajadamnern Stadium Featherweight (126 lbs) title.
1991-10-23	Win	(Thailand) Neungsiam Kiatwichian		Bangkok, Thailand	Decision	5	3:00
1991-09-	Win	(Thailand) Rajasak Sor.Vorapin	Rajadamnern Stadium	Bangkok, Thailand	Decision	5	3:00
1991-07-24	Win	(Thailand) Padejseuk Kiatsamran	Rajadamnern Stadium	Bangkok, Thailand	Decision	5	3:00
1991-06-19	Loss	(Thailand) Rajasak Sor.Vorapin	Rajadamnern Stadium	Bangkok, Thailand	Decision	5	3:00
1991-05-22	Win	(Thailand) Chanalert Muanghadyai	Rajadamnern Stadium	Bangkok, Thailand	Decision	5	3:00
1991-04-19	Win	(Thailand) Prabpram Sitsantad	Rajadamnern Stadium	Bangkok, Thailand	Decision	5	3:00
1991-03-09	Win	(Thailand) Yodkhunpon Sittraiphum	Samrong Stadium - Isuzu Cup Tournament Final	Samut Prakan, Thailand	Decision	5	3:00
Wins Isuzu Cup Super Bantamweight Tournament.
1991-01-12	Win	(Thailand) Chartchainoi Chaorai-Oi	Samrong Stadium - Isuzu Cup Tournament Semi Final	Samut Prakan, Thailand	Decision	5	3:00
1990-09-23	Win	(Thailand) Prakardseuk Kiatmuangtrang	Samrong Stadium - Isuzu Cup Tournament	Samut Prakan, Thailand	Decision	5	3:00
1990-05-23	Win	(Thailand)		Hat Yai, Thailand	Decision	5	3:00
1990-02-01	Loss	(Thailand) Supernoi Sor.Tallingchan	Rajadamnern Stadium	Bangkok, Thailand	KO	1	
1989-11-13	Win	(Thailand) Khamron Sor.Vorapin	Rajadamnern Stadium	Bangkok, Thailand	Decision	5	3:00
1989-09-27	Win	(Thailand) Songkram Porpaoin	Rajadamnern Stadium	Bangkok, Thailand	Decision	5	3:00
Wins Rajadamnern Stadium Mini Flyweight (105 lbs) title.
1989-07-08	Win	(Thailand) Lakhin Wassandasit	Rajadamnern Stadium	Bangkok, Thailand	Decision	5	3:00
1989-04-27	Win	(Thailand) Dangsanan Sitdanchai	Rajadamnern Stadium	Bangkok, Thailand	Decision	5	3:00
1989-03-30	Loss	(Thailand) Choochai Kiatchansing	Rajadamnern Stadium	Bangkok, Thailand	Decision	5	3:00
1989-02-22	Win	(Thailand) Choochai Kiatchansing	Rajadamnern Stadium	Bangkok, Thailand	Decision	5	3:00
1989-01-15	Win	(Thailand) Lakhin Wassandasit	Crocodile Farm	Samut Prakan, Thailand	Decision	5	3:00
1988-	Loss	(Thailand) Manachai Sor.Ploenchit	Samrong Stadium	Samut Prakan, Thailand	Decision	5	3:00
1988-	Draw	(Thailand) Rungrit Sor Rachan	Samrong Stadium	Samut Prakan, Thailand	Decision	5	3:00
1988-	Draw	(Thailand) Rittidet Sor.Ploenchit	Samrong Stadium	Samut Prakan, Thailand	Decision	5	3:00
1988-	Win	(Thailand) Manasak Or Pleukdaeng	Samrong Stadium	Samut Prakan, Thailand	Decision	5	3:00
1988-	Win	(Thailand) Manasak Or Pleukdaeng	Samrong Stadium	Samut Prakan, Thailand	Decision	5	3:00
1988-	Win	(Thailand) Wichanoi Sor Rachan	Samrong Stadium	Samut Prakan, Thailand	Decision	5	3:00
1987-12-01	Loss	(Thailand) Saenmuangnoi Sitkruam		Roi Et, Thailand	Decision	5	3:00
Legend: Win Loss Draw/No contest Notes
