= Rope-a-dope =

Boxing fighting style

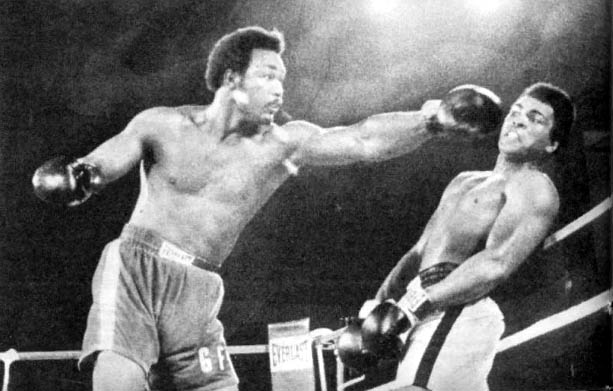
George Foreman attempts to punch Muhammad Ali, as Ali employs the "rope-a-dope" against Foreman

The rope-a-dope is a boxing fighting technique in which one contender leans against the ropes of the boxing ring to draw non-injuring offensive punches in an effort to tire out the opponent and, whilst on the ropes, tries to execute devastating offensive punches. The rope-a-dope is most famously associated with Muhammad Ali in his October 1974 Rumble in the Jungle match against world heavyweight champion George Foreman in Kinshasa, Zaire.

== Technique ==
The rope-a-dope is performed by a boxer assuming a protected stance (in Ali's classic pose, pretending to be trapped and lying against the ropes, which allows some of the punch's energy to be absorbed by the ropes' elasticity rather than the boxer's body). The boxer keeps his guard up and is prepared for the incoming blows while looking for opportunities to counter-punch the opponent, who by mounting an offensive may have left himself open to counters. By being in a defensive posture and being prepared for the incoming blows, the boxer decreases his chances of being caught with a clean flush blow. Ideally, a significant portion of the punches will land on the boxer's hands and arms, or will miss completely, as a result of the boxer slipping the punch. Additionally, if an opponent lacks stamina, the power of the punches will decrease throughout the fight and he will essentially "waste" many punches into the boxer's guard.

However, a boxer employing this tactic must have a "strong chin", or capacity to withstand punishment and thus avoid being knocked down by those punches that do get through the boxer's defenses and land. Offensively, a boxer employing this tactic will look to exploit mistakes made in the opponent's attack by countering if the opponent has left himself open. The boxer will also look to mount short bursts of offensive attacks in between his opponent's attack, being sure to immediately get back in a defensive posture so as not to leave an opening for a counterattack.

== Etymology ==
According to photographer George Kalinsky, Ali had an unusual way of conducting his sparring sessions, where he had his sparring partner hit him, which he felt "was his way of being able to take punishment in the belly". Kalinsky told him: "Do what you do in a training session: Act like a dope on the ropes." Ali then replied: "So, you want me to be a rope-a-dope?" According to Angelo Dundee, Kalinsky told Ali: "Why don't you try something like that? Sort of a dope on the ropes, letting Foreman swing away but, like in the picture, hit nothing but air." The publicist John Condon popularized the phrase "rope-a-dope".

== Notable fights ==
The maneuver is most commonly associated with the match between Muhammad Ali and George Foreman, known as "The Rumble in the Jungle". Foreman was considered by many observers to be the favorite to win the fight due to his superior punching power. Ali purposely angered Foreman during the match, provoking Foreman to attack and force him back on the ropes. Some observers at the time thought that Ali was being horribly beaten and worried that they might see him get killed in the ring. Writer George Plimpton described Ali's stance as like "a man leaning out his window trying to see something on his roof." Far from being brutalized, however, Ali was relatively protected from Foreman's blows. Norman Mailer described the advantage of Ali's rope-a-dope this way: "Standing on one's feet it is painful to absorb a heavy body punch even when blocked with one's arm. The torso, the legs, and the spine take the shock. Leaning on the ropes, however, Ali can pass it along; the rope will receive the strain."

Ali's preparation for the fight, which involved toughening himself up by allowing his sparring partners to pummel him, contributed to observers' sense that Ali was outmatched. But Ali took advantage and won the match when Foreman became tired from the punches he was delivering. Manny Pacquiao used the strategy to gauge the power of welterweight titlist Miguel Cotto in their November 2009 fight. Pacquiao followed the rope-a-dope with a knockdown. Nicolino Locche, an Argentine boxer nicknamed "El Intocable" (The Untouchable), used this technique extensively throughout his career. He would get against the ropes and dodge nearly every single punch until his opponent would tire, and then he would take him down with combinations. "Irish" Micky Ward used this strategy during many of the fights in the latter part of his career. Ward would wait for his opponent to become fatigued and would hit with either a left hook to the body or other combinations. This strategy led him to the junior welterweight championship of the WBU, where he took the belt from Shea Neary. Floyd Mayweather Jr. often used this technique in his bouts, as he demonstrated in his August 2017 fight against Conor McGregor.

Another example occurred in the 1989 middleweight bout between Michael Watson and Nigel Benn. Watson periodically employed rope-a-dope tactics, covering up against the ropes to allow Benn to expend energy before countering and stopping the previously unbeaten Benn in the sixth round. In his February 1992 fight with Ray Mercer, Larry Holmes employed a variation of the rope-a-dope, deliberately fighting from the ropes and corners while using his jab, counterpunching, clinching, and veteran ring craft to frustrate Mercer and score a unanimous-decision victory.

In the August 29, 2026 bout between Filip Hrgović and Moses Itauma, Hrgović employed a rope-a-dope strategy, allowing Itauma to expend energy while largely fighting defensively before increasing his offensive activity late in the fight.

== Usage of the term outside of fights ==
In a 2005 article for the Center for American Progress, P. J. Crowley invoked the "rope-a-dope" strategy to critique the United States' failures against the Iraqi insurgency. Foreign Policy would compare the Taliban's guerrilla strategy during the war in Afghanistan to the rope-a-dope. In a 2011 article, Daveed Gartenstein-Ross argued that al-Qaeda adopted a "rope-a-dope" strategy, seeking to exhaust the United States by drawing it into prolonged and costly conflicts. In 2024, The New York Times described Ukraine's strategy in the Russo-Ukrainian war as resembling a "rope-a-dope" tactic, in which Ukrainian forces conducted slow retreats intended to exhaust Russian forces and inflict heavy losses. The Times columnist Matthew Syed argued that Hamas had used a "rope-a-dope" strategy against Israel, during the Gaza war, provoking a large-scale military response that he argued strengthened Hamas's political position. Several commentators have compared Iran's strategy during the 2026 Iran war to the "rope-a-dope", arguing that the Iranians sought to absorb initial military strikes while gradually exhausting their adversaries through strategic and economic costs.

== See also ==
- Boxing styles and technique
