= Orachunnoi Hor.Mahachai =

Thai professional Muay Thai fighter (1950–2024)

- Orachunnoi in the 1970s
- Born: Maitri Netmanee; November 11, 1950; Thakhek, Laos
- Died: April 26, 2024 (aged 73); Mueang Ubon Ratchathani, Ubon Ratchathani, Thailand
- Native name: ไมตรี เนตรมณี
- Nickname: Poor Man's Favorite (ขวัญใจคนจน); Golden Fist (ทำปั้นทอง)
- Nationality: Thai
- Height: 171 cm (5 ft 7 in)
- Division: Light Flyweight; Flyweight; Super Flyweight
- Style: Muay Thai (Muay Mat)
- Stance: Orthodox
- Years active: c. 1965–1983

Other information
- Occupation: Muay Thai fighter Muay Thai trainer Coffee shop owner

Maitri Netmanee Thai: ไมตรี เนตรมณี; November 11, 1950 – April 26, 2024), known professionally as Orachunnoi Hor.Mahachai (Thai: อรชุนน้อย ฮ.มหาชัย), was a Thai professional Muay Thai fighter and amateur boxer. He was a two-time Lumpinee Stadium champion, as well as an Asian Amateur Boxing Championships gold medalist, who was famous in the 1970s and 1980s. Nicknamed the "Golden Fist", he was especially known for fighting larger opponents and is often regarded amongst the greatest fighters in Muay Thai history.

== Biography and career ==
Orachunnoi was born in 1950 in the city of Tkhakek, Laos to Thai parents working at the border. He grew up in the Ubon Ratchathani province where he started Muay Thai training at the age of 10 with his uncle. He later joined the Hor Machachai camp in Bangkok.

On the main circuit in Bangkok he rapidly established himself as the best fighter around the flyweight limit, winning a Lumpinee stadium title. Due to his domination in the lighter divisions he was put in numerous weight handicap matches with differences going as high as 12 lbs. He was famous for his ability to turn tides at the last second generating a massive income for spectactors who gambled on him, he was granted the nickname "The poor man's favorite". He was a spectacular fighter known for his reverse elbow attacks and surprising spinning kick techniques, at the peak of his career during the mid-1970s he was receiving purses going as high as 45,000 baht.

Orachunnoi had to undergo surgery for appendicitis in 1970 and disappeared from the rings for almost a year. He returned to competition and became a Lumpinee Champion for the second time when he was selected for the Thai national amateur boxing team. He won several medals at major gatherings such as the Asian Championship, the World Military Boxing Championship and the SEA Games all in the flyweight division.

Orachunnoi retired from competition in 1989 after losing to rising star Detduang Por Pongsawang. He married a nursing assistant in Ubon Ratchathani, had 3 children and became a trainer for the camp "Por.Thawatchai" before moving to Japan. Back to Thailand and after 25 years working as a trainer he opened a coffee shop at the Sri Maha Pho Hospital in Ubon Ratchathani province.

On March 6, 2020, Orachunnoi was inducted to the Siam Kela Muay Thai Hall of Fame at the 14th Siam Sports Awards. He died on April 26, 2024, at Sunpasitthiprasong Hospital in Ubon Ratchathani province.

== Titles and accomplishments ==
- Lumpinee Stadium
- 1974 Lumpinee Stadium Light Flyweight (108 lbs) Champion
- 1976 Lumpinee Stadium Light Flyweight (108 lbs) Champion
  - One successful title defense

== Muay Thai record ==
Muay Thai Record
Date	Result	Opponent	Event	Location	Method	Round	Time
1983-10-22	Loss	(Thailand) Detduang Por.Pongsawang		Nong Khai province, Thailand	KO	2	
1983-07-30	Win	(Thailand) Setlek Sitsingket		Roi Et, Thailand	Decision	5	3:00
1983-07-08	Loss	(Thailand) Chuchai Chor. Wanchana		Ubon Ratchathani province, Thailand	Decision	5	3:00
1983-03-11		(Thailand) Kangsadan Sor.Prateep		Ubon Ratchathani province, Thailand			
1983-02-19	Loss	(Thailand) Yutthakarn Petchyindee	Lumpinee Stadium	Bangkok, Thailand			
1981-	Loss	(Thailand) Palangsua Trabaihor	Lumpinee Stadium	Bangkok, Thailand	Decision	5	3:00
1981-07-24	Win	(Thailand) Kangsadan Sor.Prateep	Lumpinee Stadium	Bangkok, Thailand	Decision	5	3:00
1981-04-24		(Thailand) Daradej Kiatmuangtrang	Lumpinee Stadium	Bangkok, Thailand			
1981-	Loss	(Thailand) Petchnoi Manukiat		Phrae, Thailand	Decision	5	3:00
1980-11-07	Loss	(Thailand) Den Chuwattana	Lumpinee Stadium	Bangkok, Thailand	Decision	5	3:00
1980-09-26	Win	(Thailand) Yodded Singsornthong	Lumpinee Stadium	Bangkok, Thailand	Decision	5	3:00
1980-01-08	Loss	(Thailand) Maewpa Sitchang	Lumpinee Stadium	Bangkok, Thailand	Decision	5	3:00
1979-12-18	Win	(Thailand) Fonluang Luksadejmaephuangthong	Lumpinee Stadium	Bangkok, Thailand	TKO (Punches)	2	
1979-11-23	Win	(Thailand) Maewpa Sitchang	Lumpinee Stadium	Bangkok, Thailand	Decision	5	3:00
1979-10-05		(Thailand) Chatri Lukphaileuang		Bangkok, Thailand			
1979-08-13	Loss	(Thailand) Ananlek Lukminburi	Rajadamnern Stadium	Bangkok, Thailand	Decision	5	3:00
1979-06-25	Loss	(Thailand) Man Sor.Jitpatana	Rajadamnern Stadium	Bangkok, Thailand	KO	3	
1979-05-29	Win	(Thailand) Jom Kalteksawang	Lumpinee Stadium	Bangkok, Thailand	KO		
1979-04-13	Win	(Thailand) Kiatmongkol Kiatsuriya	Rajadamnern Stadium	Bangkok, Thailand	Decision	5	3:00
1979-03-17	Win	(Thailand) Sonthidet Mitphakdee		Roi Et province, Thailand	Decision	5	3:00
1979-		(Thailand) Samingnoom Sithiboontham		Thailand			
1979-01-23		(Thailand) Samingnoom Sithiboontham		Ubon Ratchathani, Thailand			
1979-01-02	Loss	(Thailand) Rungroj Lukcholae	Lumpinee Stadium	Bangkok, Thailand	Decision	5	3:00
1978-12-05	Loss	(Thailand) Tong Porntawee	Lumpinee Stadium	Bangkok, Thailand	Decision	5	3:00
1978-10-12	Win	(Thailand) Singpathom Pongsurakarn	Mumnamgoen, Rajadamnern Stadium	Bangkok, Thailand	Decision	5	3:00
1978-09-15	Loss	(Thailand) Pon Sitpordaeng	Lumpinee Stadium	Bangkok, Thailand	Decision	5	3:00
1978-09-02	Win	(Thailand) Fahkhamram Singkhlongsuan	Jao Kila Khet	Ubon Ratchathani province, Thailand	Decision	5	3:00
1978-07-14	Loss	(Thailand) Rungroj Lukcholae	Dechanukroh Stadium	Chiang Mai, Thailand	Decision	5	3:00
1978-04-21	Win	(Thailand) Rittijak Kiatsuriya	Dechanukroh Stadium	Chiang Mai, Thailand	Decision	5	3:00
1978-04-11	Loss	(Thailand) Jaipetch Chawiwong	Lumpinee Stadium	Bangkok, Thailand	Decision	5	3:00
1978-03-27	Loss	(Thailand) Ronachai Sunkilanongkhee	Phettongkam, Rajadamnern Stadium	Bangkok, Thailand	Decision	5	3:00
1978-03-10	Win	(Thailand) Densiam Sor.Prateep	Kirin Thong, Lumpinee Stadium	Bangkok, Thailand	Decision	5	3:00
1978-	Loss	(Thailand) Sornarai Sakwittaya	Lumpinee Stadium	Bangkok, Thailand	Decision	5	3:00
Loses the Lumpinee Stadium Light Flyweight (108 lbs) title.
1978-	Loss	(Thailand) Sornarai Sakwittaya	Huamark Stadium	Bangkok, Thailand	Decision	5	3:00
1978-01-13	Loss	(Thailand) Paennoi Sakornphitak	Sirimongkol, Lumpinee Stadium	Bangkok, Thailand	Decision	5	3:00
1977-12-06	Loss	(Thailand) Banpong Sitamornchai	Lumpinee Stadium	Bangkok, Thailand	Decision	5	3:00
1977-11-17	Win	(Thailand) Phetpayao Sitkrutat	Rajadamnern Stadium	Bangkok, Thailand	Decision	5	3:00
1977-09-20	Win	(Thailand) Khaokrachang Rerkchai	Lumpinee Stadium	Bangkok, Thailand	Decision	5	3:00
1977-09-05	Loss	(Thailand) Khaokrachang Rerkchai	Suk Chumthong, Rajadamnern Stadium	Bangkok, Thailand	Decision	5	3:00
1977-08-02	Win	(Thailand) Jaidee Lukbangplasoi	Lumpinee Stadium	Bangkok, Thailand	KO (Punches)	3	
1977-07-08	Loss	(Thailand) Rojanadet Rojanasongkram	Lumpinee Stadium	Bangkok, Thailand	Decision	5	3:00
1977-06-17	Win	(Thailand) Sornarai Sakwittaya	All Japan Kickboxing - Charity Title Match	Tokyo, Japan	Decision	5	3:00
Defends the Lumpinee Stadium Light Flyweight (108 lbs) title.
1977-05-27	Win	(Thailand) Thanusuk Ratchasakmontri	Lumpinee Stadium	Bangkok, Thailand	KO (Punches)	3	
1977-04-29	Loss	(Thailand) Ruankaew Sor Prasit	Lumpinee Stadium	Bangkok, Thailand	Decision	5	3:00
1977-03-10	Win	(Thailand) Densiam Sor.Prateep	Lumpinee Stadium	Bangkok, Thailand	Decision	5	3:00
1977-02-18	Loss	(Thailand) Jomwo Lookgaokawang	Lumpinee Stadium	Bangkok, Thailand	Decision	5	3:00
1977-01-	Win	(Thailand) Khaokrachang Rerkchai	Lumpinee Stadium	Bangkok, Thailand	Decision	5	3:00
1976-12-27	Loss	(Thailand) Padejsuk Pitsanurachan	Rajadamnern Stadium	Bangkok, Thailand	Decision	5	3:00
1976-12-07	Loss	(Thailand) Prawit Sritham	Lumpinee Stadium	Bangkok, Thailand	Decision	5	3:00
1976-11-	Win	(Thailand) Yodded Singsornthong	Lumpinee Stadium	Bangkok, Thailand	KO	5	
Wins the Lumpinee Stadium Light Flyweight (108 lbs) title.
1976-10-30	Loss	(Thailand) Petchnamnueng Mongkolphithak		Lampang province, Thailand	Decision	5	3:00
1976-10-22	Win	(Thailand) Thanusuk Prasopchai	Lumpinee Stadium	Bangkok, Thailand	KO	5	
1976-09-27	Win	(Thailand) Bangsai Kongkalai	Rajadamnern Stadium	Bangkok, Thailand	Decision	5	3:00
1976-09-03	NC	(Thailand) Apidejnoi Sithiran	Lumpinee Stadium	Bangkok, Thailand	Dismissal	4	
1976-08-18	Win	(Thailand) Thong Porntawee	Lumpinee Stadium	Bangkok, Thailand	Decision	5	3:00
1976-07-29	Loss	(Thailand) Singnum Phetthanin	Lumpinee Stadium	Bangkok, Thailand	Decision	5	3:00
1976-06-22	Win	(Thailand) Chainarong Sitpiboon	Lumpinee Stadium	Bangkok, Thailand	Decision	5	3:00
1976-05-	Win	(Thailand) Chanchai Napaetrew	Lumpinee Stadium	Bangkok, Thailand	KO	4	
1976-03-29	Win	(Thailand) Chanchai Napaetrew	Lumpinee Stadium	Bangkok, Thailand	Decision	5	3:00
1976-03-	Loss	(Thailand) Apidejnoi Sithiran	Rajadamnern Stadium	Bangkok, Thailand	Decision	5	3:00
1976-02-16	Loss	(Thailand) Petchnamnueng Mongkolphithak	Rajadamnern Stadium	Bangkok, Thailand	Decision	5	3:00
1976-02-01	Win	(Thailand) Samansak Poonsapcharoen		Hat Yai, Thailand	Decision	5	3:00
1976-01-08	Loss	(Thailand) Channoi Rungrit	Rajadamnern Stadium	Bangkok, Thailand	Decision	5	3:00
1975-12-11	Loss	(Thailand) Yodded Singsornthong	Lumpinee Stadium	Bangkok, Thailand	Decision	5	3:00
For the Lumpinee Stadium Light Flyweight (108 lbs) title.
1975-11-20	Win	(Thailand) Singnum Phetthanin	Rajadamnern Stadium	Bangkok, Thailand	Decision	5	3:00
1975-11-05	Win	(Thailand) Panchadej Wor.Chartniran	Rajadamnern Stadium	Thailand	TKO (Punch)	5	
1975-10-16	Win	(Thailand) Numthanong Suanmisakawan	Rajadamnern Stadium	Bangkok, Thailand	KO	4	
1975-09-26	Draw	(Thailand) Yodded Singsornthong	Lumpinee Stadium	Bangkok, Thailand	Decision	5	3:00
1975-09-01	Win	(Thailand) Saengdao Sakprasert		Thailand	KO	3	
1975-07-28	Draw	(Thailand) Channoi Rungrit	Rajadamnern Stadium	Bangkok, Thailand	Decision	5	3:00
1975-06-17	Win	(Thailand) Thanupij Sit Sor		Thailand	KO	4	
1975-05-30	Win	(Thailand) Nongrak Singkrungthon	Lumpinee Stadium	Bangkok, Thailand	KO	4	
1975-05-05	Win	(Thailand) Winainoi Nor Ban Khod		Bangkok, Thailand	KO	4	
1975-04-12	Loss	(Thailand) Daonil Singhasawin		Ubon Ratchathani province, Thailand	Decision	5	3:00
1975-03-18	Win	(Thailand) Sraththa Ro.S̄or.Phor	Lumpinee Stadium	Bangkok, Thailand	Decision	5	3:00
1975-01-31	Loss	(Thailand) Singnum Phetthanin	Lumpinee Stadium	Bangkok, Thailand	Decision	5	3:00
1975-01-07	Loss	(Thailand) Yodded Singsornthong	Lumpinee Stadium	Bangkok, Thailand	Decision	5	3:00
1974-11-22	Win	(Thailand) Singsuk Sor.Rupsuai	Yod Muay Thai, Lumpinee Stadium	Bangkok, Thailand	Decision	5	3:00
1974-10-01	Loss	(Thailand) Paruhat Loh-ngern	Lumpinee Stadium	Bangkok, Thailand	Decision	5	3:00
1974-06-11	Loss	(Thailand) Yodchat Sor.Jitpattana	Lumpinee Stadium	Bangkok, Thailand	KO (Elbow)	1	0:35
For a 100,000 baht side-bet.
1974-03-25	Loss	(Thailand) Ruengsak Porntawee	Rajadamnern Stadium	Bangkok, Thailand	Decision	5	3:00
?	Loss	(Thailand) Yodded Singsornthong	Lumpinee Stadium	Bangkok, Thailand	Decision	5	3:00
Loses the Lumpinee Stadium Light Flyweight (108 lbs) title.
1973-12-07	Win	(Thailand) Ruanpae Sitwatnang	Lumpinee Stadium	Bangkok, Thailand	Decision	5	3:00
1973-11-14	Win	(Thailand) Muanglai Sakkasem	Rajadamnern Stadium	Bangkok, Thailand	TKO	4	
1973-10-24		(Thailand) Ruanpae Sitwatnang	Rajadamnern Stadium	Bangkok, Thailand			
1973-08-21	Loss	(Thailand) Chandet Weerapol	Lumpinee Stadium	Bangkok, Thailand	Decision	5	3:00
1973-05-17	Loss	(Thailand) Samersing Tianhiran	Chartchai Chionoi vs Fritz Servet, Kittikachorn Stadium	Bangkok, Thailand	KO (High kick)	2	
1973-01-12	Loss	(Thailand) Klairung Lukchaomaesaithong	Lumpinee Stadium	Bangkok, Thailand	KO	2	
1972-10-25	Win	(Thailand) Manopnoi Singkrungthon	Lumpinee Stadium	Bangkok, Thailand	Decision	5	3:00
1972-10-12	Win	(Thailand) Manopnoi Singkrungthon	Lumpinee Stadium	Bangkok, Thailand	Decision	5	3:00
1972-08-16	Win	(Thailand) Barungthang Ror.For.Thor.	Rajadamnern Stadium	Bangkok, Thailand	Decision	5	3:00
1972-07-21	Win	(Thailand) Daothong Sityodtong	Lumpinee Stadium	Bangkok, Thailand	Decision	5	3:00
1971-12-05	Win	(Thailand) Daothong Sityodtong	Lumpinee Stadium	Bangkok, Thailand	KO	5	
1969-	Win	(Thailand) Luklop Sitsomkid		Saraburi province, Thailand	KO	4	
1969-	Win	(Thailand) Daothong Sityodtong	Lumpinee Stadium	Bangkok, Thailand	Decision	5	3:00
1969-11-07	Win	(Thailand) Saknarong Sakthanin	Lumpinee Stadium	Bangkok, Thailand	KO	2	
1969-	Loss	(Thailand) Prapichit Sityodtong	Lumpinee Stadium	Bangkok, Thailand	Decision	5	3:00
1969-	Win	(Thailand) Kaenlek Siharatdecho	Lumpinee Stadium	Bangkok, Thailand	TKO		
1969-	Win	(Thailand) Daothong Sityodtong	Lumpinee Stadium	Bangkok, Thailand	Decision	5	3:00
1969-	Win	(Thailand) Luklop Sitsomkid		Saraburi province, Thailand	TKO	3	
1969-	Loss	(Thailand) Daothong Sityodtong		Bangkok, Thailand	Decision	5	3:00
1969-	Win	(Thailand) Huamed Singchakrawat	Lumpinee Stadium	Bangkok, Thailand	Decision	5	3:00
1969-	Win	(Thailand) Aswinnoi Singnongpho	Lumpinee Stadium	Bangkok, Thailand	Decision	5	3:00
1969-	Win	(Thailand) Kritphet Esakit		Bangkok, Thailand	KO	3	
1969-	Win	(Thailand) Pornchai Sakwarin		Ubon Ratchathani province, Thailand	KO		
1969-	Win	(Thailand) Rattanachai Sitpornchai	Lumpinee Stadium	Bangkok, Thailand	Decision	5	3:00
1969-	Win	(Thailand) Lukkaew Songrit		Chonburi province, Thailand	Decision	5	3:00
1969-	Win	(Thailand) Sornoi Sirakan		Chonburi province, Thailand	KO		
1969-	Win	(Thailand) Rittidet Srithai	Lumpinee Stadium	Bangkok, Thailand	Decision	5	3:00
1969-	Win	(Thailand) Akak Singbangpho		Nonthaburi province, Thailand	KO	2	
1969-	Win	(Thailand) Praemchai Sitpornchai	Lumpinee Stadium	Bangkok, Thailand	KO	4	
1969-	Win	(Thailand) Petchnoi Sor.Lukbukhalo		Ratchaburi province, Thailand	KO	4	
1969-	Win	(Thailand) Suchin Samanchan		Ban Pong, Ratchaburi, Thailand	KO	3	
1969-	Win	(Thailand) Weerachai Ruekchai	Lumpinee Stadium	Bangkok, Thailand	KO	3	
1969-	Win	(Thailand) Rattanachai Sor Luksiam		Don Mueang district, Thailand	KO	3	
1968-11-10	Win	(Thailand) Sukkasem Saifaleb	Charusathian Stadium	Bangkok, Thailand	Decision	5	3:00
Legend: Win Loss Draw/No contest Notes
