= Jomwo Chernyim =

Thai professional Muay Thai fighter (1959-2021)

- Born: Sutee Pathompoka; December 9, 1959; Photharam, Ratchaburi, Thailand
- Died: August 18, 2021 (aged 61); Bangkok, Thailand
- Other names: Jomwo Lukkhaokwang (จอมโว ลูกเขาขวาง); Jomwo Sakniran (จอมโว ศักดิ์นิรันดร์); Jomwo Sor.Thanikul (จอมโว ส.ธนิกุล); Jomwo Chor.Waikul (จอมโว ช.ไวคุล)
- Nickname: Fighting Playboy (นักชกเพลย์บอย)
- Height: 167 cm (5 ft 6 in)
- Division: Flyweight; Bantamweight; Featherweight
- Style: Muay Thai (Muay Mat)
- Stance: Orthodox

Sutee Pathompoka (Thai: ???; December 9, 1959 – August 18, 2021), known professionally as Jomwo Chernyim (Thai: จอมโว เชิญยิ้ม) was a Thai professional Muay Thai fighter. He was a Rajadamnern Stadium Bantamweight Champion who was famous during the 1970s and 1980s.

== Biography and career ==
Jomwo began to compete in the major Bangkok stadiums in the mid-1970s under the name Jomwo Lukkhaokwang. He fought for a Stadium title for the first time against Tawanook Sitpoonchai in 1977, losing the fight by decision. A year later he lost to Kingthong Sakornpitak in a fight for the vacant Rajadamnern Stadium Bantamweight 118 lbs title. He had another chance on June 5, 1980, but was knocked out by Mafuang Weerapol in the second round.

He finally became a stadium champion on his fourth attempt when he defeated Mafuang Weerapol by decision on April 8, 1981, for the Rajadamnern Stadium 118 lbs title. He successfully defended his title against Paruhat Loh-ngoen on November 23, 1981.

After a difficult phase in the early 1980s Jomwo returned to top fighter status in 1985 defeating notable champions such as Manasak Sor Ploenchit and Samransak Muangsurin.

Jomwo received purses of more than 100,000 baht per bout at his peak, he earned the nickname of "Playboy Fighter" due to his tendency to use the money he made in fights to travel, party and gamble.

Jomwo had a last chance at a Rajadamnern Stadium title on March 20, 1989, against Kongnapa Watcharawit, he lost the fight by decision. Jomwo retired at the end of 1989.

Jomwo died on August 18, 2021, from a heart attack after contracting COVID-19.

== Titles and accomplishments ==
- Rajadamnern Stadium
  - 1981 Rajadamnern Stadium Bantamweight (118 lbs) Champion
    - One successful title defense

== Muay Thai record ==
Muay Thai Record
Date	Result	Opponent	Event	Location	Method	Round	Time
1989-12-06	Loss	(Thailand) Padejseuk Kiatsamran	Rajadamnern Stadium	Bangkok, Thailand	Decision	5	3:00
1989-11-13	Loss	(Thailand) Chokdee Kiatpayathai	Rajadamnern Stadium	Bangkok, Thailand	Decision	5	3:00
1989-10-05	Loss	(Thailand) Padejseuk Kiatsamran	Rajadamnern Stadium	Bangkok, Thailand	Decision	5	3:00
1989-06-19	Loss	(Thailand) Jack Kiatniwat	Rajadamnern Stadium	Bangkok, Thailand	Decision	5	3:00
1989-05-24	Win	(Thailand) Jack Kiatniwat	Rajadamnern Stadium	Bangkok, Thailand	Decision	5	3:00
1989-03-20	Loss	(Thailand) Kongnapa Watcharawit	Rajadamnern Stadium	Bangkok, Thailand	Decision (Unanimous)	5	3:00
For the Rajadamnern Stadium Featherweight (126 lbs) title.
1989-01-23	Win	(Thailand) Namphon Nongkeepahuyuth	Rajadamnern Stadium	Bangkok, Thailand	Decision	5	3:00
1989-01-06	Draw	(Thailand) Namphon Nongkeepahuyuth	Lumpinee Stadium	Bangkok, Thailand	Decision	5	3:00
1988-11-26	Win	(Thailand) Sanphet Lukrankgsi	Omnoi Stadium	Samut Sakhon, Thailand	Decision	5	3:00
1988-11-03	Loss	(Thailand) Petchdam Lukborai	Rajadamnern Stadium	Bangkok, Thailand	Decision	5	3:00
1988-08-18	Win	(Thailand) Sanphet Lukrankgsi	Rajadamnern Stadium	Bangkok, Thailand	Decision	5	3:00
1988-07-08	Loss	(Thailand) Thuanthong Lukdecha	Lumpinee Stadium	Bangkok, Thailand	Decision	5	3:00
1988-05-31	Loss	(Thailand) Thuanthong Lukdecha	Lumpinee Stadium	Bangkok, Thailand	Decision	5	3:00
1988-04-08	Win	(Thailand) Manasak Sor.Ploenchit	Lumpinee Stadium	Bangkok, Thailand	KO	3	
1988-03-04	Draw	(Thailand) Namphon Nongkeepahuyuth	Lumpinee Stadium	Bangkok, Thailand	Decision	5	3:00
1988-01-26	Loss	(Thailand) Prasert Jitman	Lumpinee Stadium	Bangkok, Thailand	Decision	5	3:00
1987-12-29	Loss	(Thailand) Chanchai Sor.Tamarangsri	Lumpinee Stadium	Bangkok, Thailand	Decision	5	3:00
For the Lumpinee Stadium Featherweight (126 lbs) title.
1987-11-27	Win	(Thailand) Bandon Sitbangprachan	Lumpinee Stadium	Bangkok, Thailand	KO	2	
1987-08-28	Win	(Thailand) Petchdam Lukborai	Lumpinee Stadium	Bangkok, Thailand	KO	4	
Wins a 1.7 million baht side-bet.
1987-07-24	Loss	(Thailand) Petchdam Lukborai		Bangkok, Thailand	Decision	5	3:00
For a 400,000 baht side-bet.
1987-06-19	Win	(Thailand) Sanit Wichitkriengkrai	Lumpinee Stadium	Bangkok, Thailand	Decision	5	3:00
1987-05-19	Win	(Thailand) Yoknoi Fairtex	Lumpinee Stadium	Bangkok, Thailand	KO (High kick)	4	
1987-04-10	Win	(Thailand) Petchdam Lukborai	Lumpinee Stadium	Bangkok, Thailand	KO	4	
Wins a 1.2 million baht side-bet.
1987-03-06	Loss	(Thailand) Chanchai Sor.Tamarangsri	Lumpinee Stadium	Bangkok, Thailand	Decision	5	3:00
1986-12-25	Draw	(Thailand) Jampatong Na Nontachai	Rajadamnern Stadium	Bangkok, Thailand	Decision	5	3:00
1986-11-11	Win	(Thailand) Manasak Sor.Ploenchit	Lumpinee Stadium	Bangkok, Thailand	KO (Punches)	3	
1986-10-29	Win	(Thailand) Saphaphet Kiatphetnoi	Rajadamnern Stadium	Bangkok, Thailand	Decision	5	3:00
1986-09-08	Loss	(Thailand) Sangtiennoi Sitsurapong	Rajadamnern Stadium	Bangkok, Thailand	Decision	5	3:00
1986-07-10	Win	(Thailand) Jampatong Na Nontachai	Rajadamnern Stadium	Bangkok, Thailand	Decision	5	3:00
1986-04-03	Win	(Thailand) Manasak Sor.Ploenchit	Rajadamnern Stadium	Bangkok, Thailand	Decision	5	3:00
1986-02-21	Loss	(Thailand) Nokweed Devy	Rajadamnern Stadium	Bangkok, Thailand	Decision	5	3:00
1986-02-03	Loss	(Thailand) Nokweed Devy	Rajadamnern Stadium	Bangkok, Thailand	Decision	5	3:00
1985-11-22	Win	(Thailand) Manasak Sor.Ploenchit	Rajadamnern Stadium	Bangkok, Thailand	Decision	5	3:00
1985-10-14	Win	(Thailand) Pornsaknoi Sitchang		Bangkok, Thailand	Decision	5	3:00
1985-09-02	Loss	(Thailand) Manasak Sor.Ploenchit	Rajadamnern Stadium	Bangkok, Thailand	Decision	5	3:00
1985-06-18	Win	(Thailand) Samransak Muangsurin	Lumpinee Stadium	Bangkok, Thailand	Decision	5	3:00
1985-04-03	Win	(Thailand) Nikhom Phetphothong		Bangkok, Thailand	Decision	5	3:00
1984-12-21	Win	(Thailand) Singdaeng Kiatardi	Lumpinee Stadium	Bangkok, Thailand	KO	1	
1984-10-26	Win	(Thailand) Panmongkol Hor Mahachai		Bangkok, Thailand	Decision	5	3:00
1984-07-31	Win	(Thailand) Nakhonpathom Pinsinchai	Lumpinee Stadium	Bangkok, Thailand	KO	4	
1984-07-06	Loss	(Thailand) Samart Fairtex	Lumpinee Stadium	Bangkok, Thailand	Decision	5	3:00
1984-06-06	Win	(Thailand) Saphaphet Kiattiphetnoi	Rajadamnern Stadium	Bangkok, Thailand	KO	3	
1984-05-02	Loss	(Thailand) Saphaphet Kiattiphetnoi		Bangkok, Thailand	Decision	5	3:00
1983-06-20	Loss	(Thailand) Phanomsing Manukiat		Phan district, Thailand	Decision	5	3:00
1983-04-05	Win	(Thailand) Lamkhong Sitwaiwat	Lumpinee Stadium	Bangkok, Thailand	Decision	5	3:00
1983-03-10	Loss	(Thailand) Wanpadet Sitkhrumai	Rajadamnern Stadium	Bangkok, Thailand	Decision	5	3:00
1982-12-24	Loss	(Thailand) Samransak Muangsurin	Rajadamnern Stadium	Bangkok, Thailand	KO (Left hook)	3	
1982-11-19	Loss	(Thailand) Panmongkol Hor.Mahachai	Lumpinee Stadium	Bangkok, Thailand	Decision	5	3:00
1982-09-30	Win	(Thailand) Porntep Kiatsingnoi		Thailand	Decision	5	3:00
1982-09-07	Win	(Thailand) Chakrawan Kiattisakthewan		Thailand	Decision	5	3:00
1982-08-02	Loss	(Thailand) Samransak Muangsurin	Rajadamnern Stadium	Bangkok, Thailand	Decision	5	3:00
1982-06-07	Loss	(Thailand) Panmongkol Hor.Mahachai	Rajadamnern Stadium	Bangkok, Thailand	Decision	5	3:00
1982-04-19	Loss	(Thailand) Samingnoom Sithiboontham	Rajadamnern Stadium	Bangkok, Thailand	Decision	5	3:00
1982-03-29	Loss	(Thailand) Samingnoom Sithiboontham	Rajadamnern Stadium	Bangkok, Thailand	Decision	5	3:00
1981-11-23	Win	(Thailand) Paruhat Loh-ngoen	Rajadamnern Stadium	Bangkok, Thailand	Decision (Unanimous)	5	3:00
Defends the Rajadamnern Stadium Bantamweight (118 lbs) title.
1981-09-25	Loss	(Thailand) Pon Sitpordaeng	Rajadamnern Stadium	Bangkok, Thailand	Decision	5	3:00
1981-08-20	Loss	(Thailand) Samingnoom Sithiboontham	Rajadamnern Stadium	Bangkok, Thailand	Decision	5	3:00
1981-04-08	Win	(Thailand) Mafuang Weerapol	Rajadamnern Stadium	Bangkok, Thailand	Decision	5	3:00
Wins the Rajadamnern Stadium Bantamweight (118 lbs) title.
1981-01-09	Win	(Thailand) Chokchainoi Muangchaiyaphum	Sirimongkol, Lumpinee Stadium	Bangkok, Thailand	Decision	5	3:00
1980-11-10	Win	(Thailand) Ekkarat Sor.Ngamkamol	Rajadamnern Stadium	Bangkok, Thailand	Decision	5	3:00
1980-10-01	Loss	(Thailand) Ekkarat Sor.Ngamkamol	Rajadamnern Stadium	Bangkok, Thailand	Decision	5	3:00
1980-06-05	Loss	(Thailand) Mafuang Weerapol	Rajadamnern Stadium	Bangkok, Thailand	KO (Punch)	2	
For the Rajadamnern Stadium Bantamweight (118 lbs) title.
1980-04-28	Win	(Thailand) Jock Kiatniwat	Rajadamnern Stadium	Bangkok, Thailand	Decision	5	3:00
1980-01-09	Loss	(Thailand) Chokchainoi Sor.Chokprasert	Lumpinee Stadium	Bangkok, Thailand	Decision	5	3:00
1979-12-07	Win	(Thailand) Kwanruen Sitpermsup	Lumpinee Stadium	Bangkok, Thailand	Decision	5	3:00
1978-12-06	Loss	(Thailand) Kingthong Sakornpitak	Rajadamnern Stadium	Bangkok, Thailand	Decision	5	3:00
For the vacant Rajadamnern Stadium Bantamweight (118 lbs) title.
1978-10-12	Win	(Thailand) Kengkla Sitsei		Bangkok, Thailand	Decision	5	3:00
1978-07-18	Win	(Thailand) Chakchainoi Sakwittaya	Lumpinee Stadium	Bangkok, Thailand	Decision	5	3:00
1978-06-21	Win	(Thailand) Ronnachai Sunkilanongki		Bangkok, Thailand	Decision	5	3:00
1978-05-01	Loss	(Thailand) Paennoi Sakornphitak	Rajadamnern Stadium	Bangkok, Thailand	KO	2	
1978-03-	Win	(Thailand) Ronnachai Sunkilanongki		Bangkok, Thailand	Decision	5	3:00
1978-02-27	Loss	(Thailand) Khaokrajang Rekchai	Rajadamnern Stadium	Bangkok, Thailand	KO	3	
1978-01-27	Loss	(Thailand) Khaosod Sitpraprom	Lumpinee Stadium	Bangkok, Thailand	Decision	5	3:00
1977-11-03	Win	(Thailand) Saenchai Jokker Sabaiyothin	Rajadamnern Stadium	Bangkok, Thailand	Decision	5	3:00
1977-08-04	Loss	(Thailand) Petchnamnueng Mongkhonpitak	Rajadamnern Stadium	Bangkok, Thailand	Decision	5	3:00
1977-06-02	Loss	(Thailand) Tawanook Sitpoonchai	Rajadamnern Stadium	Bangkok, Thailand	Decision	5	3:00
For the Rajadamnern Stadium Flyweight (112 lbs) title.
1977-04-07	Win	(Thailand) Tawanook Sitpoonchai		Bangkok, Thailand	Decision	5	3:00
1977-02-18	Win	(Thailand) Orachunnoi Hor.Mahachai	Lumpinee Stadium	Bangkok, Thailand	Decision	5	3:00
1977-01-	Win	(Thailand) Bangsai Khongkhalai		Bangkok, Thailand	Decision	5	3:00
1976-12-15	Win	(Thailand) Thong Porntawee	Rajadamnern Stadium	Bangkok, Thailand	Decision	5	3:00
1976-03-10	Win	(Thailand) Prapraek Sitsawat	Rajadamnern Stadium	Bangkok, Thailand	Decision	5	3:00
Legend: Win Loss Draw/No contest Notes
