= Lom-Isan Sor.Thanikul =

Thai professional Muay Thai fighter

Lom-Isan
- Born: Chalom Muntreepakdee; November 9, 1956; Khon Kaen province, Thailand
- Died: March 20, 2016 (aged 59); Phitsanulok, Thailand
- Other names: Lompetch Sor. Songrat (ลมเพชร ส.ทรงรัตน์); Lom Isan Davy (ลมอีสาน เดวี่)
- Height: 171 cm (5 ft 7 in)
- Division: Bantamweight; Super Bantamweight; Featherweight
- Style: Muay Thai
- Stance: Southpaw
- Team: Sor.Thanikul

Chalom Muntreepakdee (Thai: ???; November 9, 1956 – March 20, 2016), known professionally as Lom-Isan Sor.Thanikul (Thai: ลมอีสาน ส.ธนิกุล), was a Thai professional Muay Thai fighter. He was a one-time Lumpinee Stadium champion and two-time Rajadamnern Stadium champion across two divisions who was famous during the 1970s and 1980s.

== Biography and career ==
Born Chalom Muntreepakdee started competing in Muay Thai out of the Sor.Songrat camp and fighting under the ring name Lompetch Sor.Songrat in various provinces until he won the Isan province 118 lbs title.

He moved to Bangkok in 1979 fighting under the ring name Lom-Isan Davy, there he won the Lumpinee Stadium 122 lbs title against Nakhonsawan Suamisakawan on June 29, 1980. He successfully defended his title against Krongsak Sakkasema month later. Shortly after he decided to join the Sor.Thanikul camp. He went on to become one of the best higher weights fighters of Thailand throughout the 1980s, defeating notable champions of this era such as Saengsakda Kittikasem, Wanpadet Sitkhrumai or Samingnoom Sithiboontham. He had a famous rivalry against Nokweed Davy with who he traded the Rajadamnern Stadium 126 lbs title.

Lom-Isan retired from fighting 1993 and became a muay thai trainer for various camps before opening a family business in the Phitsanulok province. Lom-Isan died on March 20, 2016, at the age of 59.

== Titles and accomplishments ==
- Lumpinee Stadium
  - 1980 Lumpinee Stadium Super Bantamweight (122 lbs) Champion
    - One successful title defense
- Rajadamnern Stadium
  - 1983 Rajadamnern Stadium Featherweight (126 lbs) Champion
    - Three successful title defenses
  - 1985 Rajadamnern Stadium Featherweight (126 lbs) Champion

== Muay Thai record ==
Muay Thai Record
Date	Result	Opponent	Event	Location	Method	Round	Time
1993-09-19	Loss	(Suriname) Gilbert Ballantine		Amsterdam, Netherlands	Decision	5	3:00
For the IMTA World championship.
?	Loss	(France) Fabrice Payen		France	Decision	5	3:00
1988-	Win	(Thailand) Tukchai Charoenmuang		Thailand	Decision	5	3:00
1988-09-17	Win	(Japan) Naoyuki Taira	Shootboxing	Tokyo, Japan	Decision (Majority)	5	3:00
1986-12-22	Win	(Thailand) Narak Sitkwanyim		Bangkok, Thailand	Decision	5	3:00
1986-10-29	Loss	(Thailand) Kongdej Chor.Wirach		Bangkok, Thailand	Decision	5	3:00
1986-08-11	Loss	(Thailand) Pornsaknoi Sitchang		Bangkok, Thailand	Decision	5	3:00
1986-06-26	Loss	(Thailand) Rungnarong Thairungruang		Bangkok, Thailand	Decision	5	3:00
1986-05-29	Win	(Thailand) Rungnarong Thairungruang		Bangkok, Thailand	Decision	5	3:00
1986-04-07	Win	(Thailand) Tukchai Charoenmuang		Bangkok, Thailand	Decision	5	3:00
1985-12-23	Loss	(Thailand) Kengkatnoi Kiatniwat	Rajadamnern Stadium	Bangkok, Thailand	Decision	5	3:00
Loses the Rajadamnern Stadium Featherweight (126 lbs) title.
1985-12-06	Win	(Thailand) Samingnoom Sithiboontham		Ubon Ratchathani, Thailand	Decision	5	3:00
1985-11-06	Draw	(Thailand) Tukchai Charoenmuang	Rajadamnern Stadium	Bangkok, Thailand	Decision	5	3:00
1985-10-08	Loss	(Thailand) Prasert Jitman		Bangkok, Thailand	Decision	5	3:00
1985-09-10	Win	(Thailand) Daoden Sakornphitak	Lumpinee Stadium	Bangkok, Thailand	Decision	5	3:00
1985-07-29	Loss	(Thailand) Nokweed Devy	Rajadamnern Stadium	Bangkok, Thailand	TKO	4	
1985-06-24	Win	(Thailand) Nokweed Devy	Rajadamnern Stadium	Bangkok, Thailand	Decision	5	3:00
Wins the Rajadamnern Stadium Featherweight (126 lbs) title.
1985-05-30	Loss	(Thailand) Nokweed Devy	Rajadamnern Stadium	Bangkok, Thailand	Decision	5	3:00
For the Rajadamnern Stadium Featherweight (126 lbs) title.
1985-03-02	Loss	(Thailand) Samingnoom Sithiboontham		Buriram province, Thailand	Decision	5	3:00
1985-02-02	Loss	(Thailand) Nokweed Devy		Hat Yai, Thailand	Decision	5	3:00
Loses the Rajadamnern Stadium Featherweight (126 lbs) title.
1984-11-21	Win	(Thailand) Nokweed Devy	Rajadamnern Stadium	Bangkok, Thailand	Decision	5	3:00
1984-10-08	Win	(Thailand) Nokweed Devy	Sot Chitalada vs Gabriel Bernal, Nimibutr Stadium	Bangkok, Thailand	Decision	5	3:00
Defends the Rajadamnern Stadium Featherweight (126 lbs) title.
1984-07-26	Win	(Thailand) Kengkla Sitsei	Rajadamnern Stadium	Bangkok, Thailand	Decision	5	3:00
1984-06-14	Win	(Thailand) Samingnoom Sithiboontham	Rajadamnern Stadium	Bangkok, Thailand	Decision	5	3:00
1984-05-05	Loss	(Thailand) Wanpadet Sitkhrumai		Nakhon Si Thammarat, Thailand	Decision	5	3:00
1984-04-18	Win	(Thailand) Jock Kiatniwat	Rajadamnern Stadium	Bangkok, Thailand	Decision	5	3:00
1984-02-20	Win	(Thailand) Wanpadet Sitkhrumai	Rajadamnern Stadium	Bangkok, Thailand	Decision	5	3:00
1984-01-18	Win	(Thailand) Kengkajnoi Kiatniwat	Rajadamnern Stadium	Bangkok, Thailand	KO	2	
Defends the Rajadamnern Stadium Featherweight (126 lbs) title.
1983-12-14	Draw	(Thailand) Kengkajnoi Kiatniwat	Rajadamnern Stadium	Bangkok, Thailand	Decision	5	3:00
Defends the Rajadamnern Stadium Featherweight (126 lbs) title.
1983-11-14	Win	(Thailand) Kengkaj Kiatkriangkrai	Rajadamnern Stadium	Bangkok, Thailand	Decision	5	3:00
1983-09-28	Win	(Thailand) Wanpadet Sitkhrumai	Rajadamnern Stadium	Bangkok, Thailand	Decision	5	3:00
Wins the vacant Rajadamnern Stadium Featherweight (126 lbs) title.
1983-08-12	Win	(Thailand) Daoden Sakornpitak	Rajadamnern Stadium	Bangkok, Thailand	Decision	5	3:00
1983-07-28	Win	(Thailand) Kengkaj Kiatkriangkrai	Rajadamnern Stadium	Bangkok, Thailand	Decision	5	3:00
1983-06-04	Loss	(Thailand) Tawanoook Penmongkol		Khon Kaen, Thailand	Decision	5	3:00
1983-05-19	Win	(Thailand) Singpathom Phongsurakan	Rajadamnern Stadium	Bangkok, Thailand	Decision	5	3:00
1983-04-04	Win	(Thailand) Wanpadet Sitkhrumai	Rajadamnern Stadium	Bangkok, Thailand	Decision	5	3:00
1982-12-30	Loss	(Thailand) Tawanook Penmongkol	Rajadamnern Stadium	Bangkok, Thailand	Decision	5	3:00
1982-11-29	Loss	(Thailand) Tawanook Penmongkol	Rajadamnern Stadium	Bangkok, Thailand	Decision	5	3:00
1982-10-28	Win	(Thailand) Tawanook Penmongkol	Rajadamnern Stadium	Bangkok, Thailand	Decision	5	3:00
1982-09-28	Loss	(Thailand) Singpathom Phongsurakan	Rajadamnern Stadium	Bangkok, Thailand	Decision	5	3:00
1982-08-25	Win	(Thailand) Kengkla Sitsei	Rajadamnern Stadium	Bangkok, Thailand	Decision	5	3:00
1982-08-06	Win	(Thailand) Saengsakda Kittikasem	Lumpinee Stadium	Bangkok, Thailand	Decision	5	3:00
1982-07-14	Loss	(Thailand) Singpathom Phongsurakan	Rajadamnern Stadium	Bangkok, Thailand	Decision	5	3:00
For the Rajadamnern Stadium Featherweight (126 lbs) title.
1982-06-07	Win	(Thailand) Ronachai Sunkilnongkhee	Rajadamnern Stadium	Bangkok, Thailand	Decision	5	3:00
1982-05-06	Win	(Thailand) Thong Lukbansuan	Lumpinee Stadium	Bangkok, Thailand	Decision	5	3:00
1982-03-23	Win	(Thailand) Thong Lukbansuan	Lumpinee Stadium	Bangkok, Thailand	Decision	5	3:00
1982-02-11	Win	(Thailand) Ekkarat Sor Ngamkamol		Bangkok, Thailand	Decision	5	3:00
1981-12-21	Win	(Thailand) Samersing Tianhiran		Bangkok, Thailand	Decision	5	3:00
1981-10-10	Loss	(Thailand) Bandasak Porntawee		Ubon Ratchathani, Thailand	Decision	5	3:00
1981-07-02	Loss	(Thailand) Ronachai Sunkilanongkhee		Bangkok, Thailand	Decision	5	3:00
1981-04-03	Loss	(Thailand) Saengsakda Kittikasem	Lumpinee Stadium	Bangkok, Thailand	KO	3	
Loses the Lumpinee Stadium Super Bantamweight (122 lbs) title.
1980-12-25	Loss	(Thailand) Singpathom Phongsurakan	Rajadamnern Stadium	Bangkok, Thailand	Decision	5	3:00
1980-11-07	Win	(Thailand) Bandasak Porntawee	Lumpinee Stadium	Bangkok, Thailand	Decision	5	3:00
1980-08-28	Loss	(Thailand) Bandasak Porntawee	Rajadamnern Stadium	Bangkok, Thailand	Decision	5	3:00
1980-07-22	Win	(Thailand) Krongsak Sakkasem	Lumpinee Stadium	Bangkok, Thailand	KO (High Kick)	4	
Defends the Lumpinee Stadium Super Bantamweight (122 lbs) title.
1980-06-29	Win	(Thailand) Nakhonsawan Suamisakawan	Lumpinee Stadium	Bangkok, Thailand	Decision (Unanimous)	5	3:00
Wins the Lumpinee Stadium Super Bantamweight (122 lbs) title.
1980-	Win	(Thailand) Nakhonsawan Suamisakawan		Bangkok, Thailand	Decision	5	3:00
1980-	Win	(Thailand) Fanta Pornphitsanu		Bangkok, Thailand	TKO	4	
1980-02-28	Draw	(Thailand) Fanta Pornphitsanu	Rajadamnern Stadium	Bangkok, Thailand	Decision	5	3:00
1979-	Win	(Thailand) Sakda Boonrot		Bangkok, Thailand	Decision	5	3:00
1979-07-31	Draw	(Thailand) Sailom Kwinchumpae	Khon Kaen Boxing Stadium	Khon Kaen, Thailand	Decision	5	3:00
1979-	Win	(Thailand) Sakda Boonrot		Thailand	Decision	5	3:00
1979-	Win	(Thailand) Boonyong Songsornthong		Thailand	KO	4	
1979-	Win	(Thailand) Yodchat Sor.Jitpattana		Thailand	Decision	5	3:00
1978-11-03	Win	(Thailand) Inseenoi Luknongkhaikan	Khon Kaen Boxing Stadium	Khon Kaen, Thailand	Decision	5	3:00
1978-09-28	Win	(Thailand) Sornrong Kiatkraisorn	Rajadamnern Stadium	Bangkok, Thailand	Decision	5	3:00
1978-06-02	Win	(Thailand) Metro Prasarnmit	Sagat Petchyindee vs Wilfredo Gomez	Nakhon Ratchasima, Thailand	Decision	5	3:00
Legend: Win Loss Draw/No contest Notes

== See more ==
- List of Muay Thai practitioners
