= Sangtiennoi Sor.Rungroj =

Thai professional Muay Thai fighter (1966–2021)

- Born: Thiraphan Chinanad; August 16, 1966; Pathum Thani, Thailand
- Died: May 16, 2021 (aged 54)
- Native name: ธีรพันธ์ ชินานัด
- Other names: Sangtiennoi Sitsurapong (แสงเทียนน้อย ศิษย์สุรพงษ์)
- Nickname: The Deadly Kisser (จอมจุมพิต)
- Height: 175 cm (5 ft 9 in)
- Division: Super Featherweight; Lightweight
- Style: Muay Thai (Muay Bouk)
- Stance: Southpaw
- Team: Tor.Sangtiennoi Gym
- Years active: c. 1979–2000

Other information
- Notable students: Thanonchai Thanakorngym; Fahbunmee BirdRangsit; Chorfah Tor.Sangtiennoi; Kongchai Chanaidonmuang

Thiraphan Chinanad (Thai: ธีรพันธ์ ชินานัด; August 16, 1966 – May 16, 2021), known professionally as Sangtiennoi Sor.Rungroj (Thai: แสงเทียนน้อย ส.รุ่งโรจน์), was a Thai professional Muay Thai fighter. He was a Lumpinee Stadium and Rajadamnern Stadium champion across two divisions who was famous during the 1980s and 1990s. After his retirement and until his death he continued to be a Muay Thai trainer at his own gym.

== Biography and career ==
Sangtiennoi had his first fight at 13 years of age against his parents' will, and won 100 baht. He moved to Lukmingkwan gym to start his career in Bangkok, where he took the name Sangtiennoi Sitsurapong.

Sangtiennoi was one of the most popular Muay Thai fighters of his era, receiving purses of over 200,000 baht. His aggressive fighting style made him a fan favorite and saw him fighting for the King's Birthday events against famous international competitors including Dany Bill and Ramon Dekkers.

Sangtiennoi was also a primary training partner and Thai-based teacher of successful Australian Muay Thai fighter John Wayne Parr.

During his fight with Yucel Fidan in 1999 Sangtiennoi, dislocated his shoulder. The injury would continue to hinder him, and he was forced to retire in 2000 when his shoulder was damaged against Takashi Ito in Japan.

During the recovery from injuries, Sangtiennoi opened a gym in his native Pathum Thani.

On May 16, 2021, Sangtiennoi took his own life with a gun, at the age of 54.

== Titles & honours ==
Rajadamnern Stadium

- 1989 Rajadamnern Stadium Super Featherweight (130 lbs) Champion

Lumpinee Stadium

- 1997 Lumpinee Stadium Lightweight (135 lbs) Champion
  - One successful title defense

World Muay Thai Council

- 1998 WMTC World -65 kg Champion

== Fight record ==
Muay Thai Record (Incomplete)
Date	Result	Opponent	Event	Location	Method	Round	Time
2000-03-20	Loss	(Japan) Takashi Ito	MAJKF "Combat 2000"	Tokyo, Japan	TKO (Shoulder dislocation)	5	2:28
For the WMAF Super Welterweight Championship.
1999-03-12	Loss	(Turkey) Yucel Fidan	Impact, Muang Thong Thani	Pak Kret District, Thailand	TKO (Shoulder dislocation)	4	
1998-12-05	Loss	(France) Dany Bill	King's Birthday Event	Bangkok, Thailand	Decision (Unanimous)	5	3:00
1998-11-14	Ex	(Japan) Hiromu Yoshitaka	Shootboxing GROUND ZERO TOKYO	Tokyo, Japan	Exhibition	3	3:00
1998-10-31	Win	(Thailand) Kaoponglek Luksuratham	Lumpinee Stadium	Bangkok, Thailand	Decision	5	3:00
1998-09-29	Loss	(Thailand) Samkor Kiatmontep	Lumpinee Stadium	Bangkok, Thailand	Decision	5	3:00
Loses the Lumpinee Stadium Lightweight (135 lbs) title.
1998-08-28	Draw	(Thailand) Samkor Chor.Rathchatasupak	Onesongchai, Lumpinee Stadium	Bangkok, Thailand	Decision	5	3:00
1998-08-09	Win	(Australia) Marcus Mangan	Thailand vs Australia	Australia	Decision (Unanimous)	5	3:00
Wins the WMC World -65kg lbs title.
1998-	Win	(Thailand) Nuengtrakarn Por.MuangUbon	Lumpinee Stadium	Bangkok, Thailand	Decision	5	3:00
1998-02-14	Win	(Thailand) Prabpramlek Sitnarong	Lumpinee Stadium	Bangkok, Thailand	Decision	5	3:00
Defends Lumpinee Stadium Lightweight (135 lbs) title.
1997-12-05	Win	(Morocco) Hassan Kassrioui	King's Birthday Event	Bangkok, Thailand	Decision	5	3:00
1997-09-27	Win	(Thailand) Keng Singnakhonkui	Lumpinee Stadium	Bangkok, Thailand	Decision	5	3:00
Wins the vacant Lumpinee Stadium Lightweight (135 lbs) title.
1997-06-14	Loss	(Thailand) Kriengkrai Sor.Worapin	Lumpinee Stadium	Bangkok, Thailand	Decision	5	3:00
1997-04-20	Loss	(Netherlands) Ramon Dekkers	The Night of No Mercy	Amsterdam, Netherlands	Decision (Unanimous)	5	3:00
1996-10-11	Draw	(Thailand) Orono Por.MuangUbon	Lumpinee Stadium	Bangkok, Thailand	Decision	5	3:00
For the Lumpinee Stadium Lightweight (135 lbs) title.
1996-09-21	Loss	(Thailand) Sakmongkol Sithchuchok	Beer Chang Tournament, Semi Final	Bangkok, Thailand	Decision (Unanimous)	5	3:00
1996-07-13	Loss	(Thailand) Wallop Sor.Sartpat	Lumpinee Stadium	Bangkok, Thailand	Decision	5	3:00
1996-06-08	Win	(Thailand) Chandet Sor.Prantalay	Lumpinee Stadium	Bangkok, Thailand	Decision	5	3:00
1996-05-03	Win	(Thailand) Pairot Wor.Wolapon	Lumpinee Stadium	Bangkok, Thailand			
1996-03-30	Win	(France) Dany Bill		Pattaya, Thailand	Decision	5	3:00
1996-01-19	Win	(Thailand) Jongsanan Fairtex	Fairtex, Lumpinee Stadium	Bangkok, Thailand	Decision	5	3:00
1995-12-30	Win	(Thailand) Pairot Wor.Wolapon	Lumpinee Stadium	Bangkok, Thailand			
1995-11-22	Win	(Thailand) Angkarndej Por.Paoin	Rajadamnern Stadium	Bangkok, Thailand	Decision	5	3:00
1995-11-03	Loss	(Thailand) Pairot Wor.Wolapon	Lumpinee Stadium	Bangkok, Thailand	Decision	5	3:00
1995-09-29	Loss	(Thailand) Jongsanan Fairtex	Lumpinee Stadium	Bangkok, Thailand	Decision	5	3:00
1995-09-05	Win	(Thailand) Pairot Wor.Wolapon	Lumpinee Stadium	Bangkok, Thailand	Decision	5	3:00
1995-08-18	Draw	(Thailand) Jongsanan Fairtex	Lumpinee Stadium	Bangkok, Thailand	Decision	5	3:00
1995-06-30	Win	(Thailand) Kongnapa BM Service	Lumpinee Stadium	Bangkok, Thailand	Decision	5	3:00
1995-	Win	(Thailand) Chandet Sor Prantalay	Lumpinee Stadium	Bangkok, Thailand	Decision	5	3:00
1995-02-04	Loss	(Thailand) Sakmongkol Sithchuchok	Lumpinee Stadium	Bangkok, Thailand	Decision	5	3:00
1994-11-18	Loss	(Thailand) Sakmongkol Sithchuchok	Lumpinee Stadium	Bangkok, Thailand	Decision	5	3:00
1994-10-10	Win	(Thailand) Nuathoranee Thongracha	Lumpinee Stadium	Bangkok, Thailand	Decision	5	3:00
1994-07-02	Loss	(Thailand) Orono Por.MuangUbon	Lumpinee Stadium	Bangkok, Thailand	TKO (Shoulder dislocation)	3	
1994-03-25	Loss	(Thailand) Chandet Sor Prantalay	Lumpinee Stadium	Bangkok, Thailand	Decision	5	3:00
For the Lumpinee Stadium Lightweight (135 lbs) title.
1994-	Loss	(Thailand) Chandet Sor Prantalay	Lumpinee Stadium	Bangkok, Thailand	TKO (Doctor Stoppage)	4	
1993-11-27	Loss	(Thailand) Chanchai Sor.Tamarangsri	Lumpinee Stadium	Bangkok, Thailand	Decision	5	3:00
1993-10-22	Win	(Thailand) Chanchai Sor.Tamarangsri	Lumpinee Stadium	Bangkok, Thailand	Decision	5	3:00
1993-09-17	Win	(Thailand) Klasuk Tor.Witthaya	Lumpinee Stadium	Bangkok, Thailand	Decision	5	3:00
1993-08-31	Win	(Thailand) Orono Por.MuangUbon	Lumpinee Stadium	Bangkok, Thailand	Decision	5	3:00
1993-07-27	Loss	(Thailand) Orono Por.MuangUbon	Lumpinee Stadium	Bangkok, Thailand	Decision	5	3:00
1992-12-24	Loss	(Thailand) Chandet Sor Prantalay	Lumpinee Stadium	Bangkok, Thailand	Decision	5	3:00
1992-11-13	Loss	(Thailand) Chanchai Sor.Tamarangsri	Lumpinee Stadium	Bangkok, Thailand	Decision	5	3:00
1992-10-13	Loss	(Thailand) Panomrunglek Chor.Sawat	Lumpinee Stadium	Bangkok, Thailand	Decision	5	3:00
For the vacant Lumpinee Stadium Lightweight (135 lbs) title.
1992-09-	Win	(Thailand) Sakmongkol Sithchuchok	Lumpinee Stadium	Bangkok, Thailand	Decision	5	3:00
1992-08-14	Loss	(Thailand) Jongsanan Fairtex	Lumpinee Stadium	Bangkok, Thailand	Decision	5	3:00
1992-07-07	Win	(Thailand) Cherry Sor.Wanich	Lumpinee Stadium	Bangkok, Thailand	Decision	5	3:00
1992-06-13	Loss	(Thailand) Petchdam Lukborai	Lumpinee Stadium	Bangkok, Thailand	Decision	5	3:00
1992-05-01	Loss	(Thailand) Petchdam Lukborai	Lumpinee Stadium	Bangkok, Thailand	Decision	5	3:00
1992-03-20	Loss	(Thailand) Therdkiat Sitthepitak	Lumpinee Stadium	Bangkok, Thailand	Decision	5	3:00
1992-01-07	Win	(Thailand) Cherry Sor.Wanich	Lumpinee Stadium	Bangkok, Thailand	Decision	5	3:00
1991-12-27	Win	(Thailand) Namphon Nongkeepahuyuth	Lumpinee Stadium	Bangkok, Thailand	Decision	5	3:00
1991-11-26	Win	(Thailand) Namphon Nongkeepahuyuth	Lumpinee Stadium	Bangkok, Thailand	Decision	5	3:00
1991-10-25	Loss	(Thailand) Namkabuan Nongkeepahuyuth	Lumpinee Stadium	Bangkok, Thailand	Decision	5	3:00
For the Yodmuaythai trophy.
1991-09-24	Loss	(Thailand) Namkabuan Nongkeepahuyuth	Lumpinee Stadium	Bangkok, Thailand	Decision	5	3:00
1991-09-03	Win	(Netherlands) Ramon Dekkers	Lumpinee Stadium	Bangkok, Thailand	Decision (Unanimous)	5	3:00
1991-05-31	Win	(Thailand) Nuathoranee Thongracha	Lumpinee Stadium	Bangkok, Thailand	Decision	5	3:00
1991-05-10	Loss	(Thailand) Nuathoranee Thongracha	Lumpinee Stadium	Bangkok, Thailand	Decision	5	3:00
1991-03-22	Win	(Netherlands) Ramon Dekkers	MAJKF	Bunkyo, Tokyo, Japan	Decision (Unanimous)	5	3:00
1991-02-15	Win	(Thailand) Superlek Sornisaan		Phra Nakhon Si Ayutthaya, Thailand	Decision	5	3:00
1991-01-04	Win	(Thailand) Cherry Sor.Wanich	Lumpinee Stadium	Bangkok, Thailand	KO (Knee to the Head)	3	
Receives the Yodmuaythai trophy.
1990-11-30	Loss	(Thailand) Chamuakpetch Haphalung	Rajadamnern Stadium	Bangkok, Thailand	Decision	5	3:00
1990-10-14	Loss	(Netherlands) Gilbert Ballantine		Amsterdam, Netherlands	Decision	5	3:00
For the WMTA World championship.
1990-08-25	Win	(New Zealand) Malik		New Zealand	KO	2	
1990-06-30	Win	(Thailand) Jack Kiatniwat	Chiang Mai Stadium	Chiang Mai, Thailand	Decision	5	3:00
1990-05-30	Loss	(Thailand) Chamuakpetch Haphalung	Rajadamnern Stadium	Bangkok, Thailand	Decision	5	3:00
1990-02-01	Win	(Thailand) Kongnapa Watcharawit	Rajadamnern Stadium	Bangkok, Thailand	TKO	3	
1990-01-04	Win	(Thailand) Nokweed Devy	Rajadamnern Stadium	Bangkok, Thailand	Decision	5	3:00
1989-12-06	Win	(Thailand) Nokweed Devy	Rajadamnern Stadium	Bangkok, Thailand	Decision	5	3:00
1989-10-18	Loss	(Thailand) Nokweed Devy	Rajadamnern Stadium	Bangkok, Thailand	Decision	5	3:00
1989-08-30	Win	(Thailand) Sombat Sor.Thanikul	Rajadamnern Stadium	Bangkok, Thailand	Decision	5	3:00
1989-07-09	Win	(Thailand) Manasak Chor.Rojanachai	Rajadamnern Stadium	Bangkok, Thailand	Decision	5	3:00
1989-06-05	Loss	(Thailand) Chamuakpetch Haphalung	Rajadamnern Stadium	Bangkok, Thailand	Decision	5	3:00
1989-04-24	Draw	(Thailand) Chamuakpetch Haphalung	Rajadamnern Stadium	Bangkok, Thailand	Decision	5	3:00
1989-02-22	Win	(Thailand) Kongnapa Watcharawit	Rajadamnern Stadium	Bangkok, Thailand	Decision	5	3:00
1989-01-15	Win	(Thailand) Jack Kiatniwat	Crocodile Farm	Samut Prakan, Thailand	Decision	5	3:00
Wins the Rajadamnern Stadium Super Featherweight (130 lbs) title.
1988-11-18	Loss	(Thailand) Prasert Kittikasem	Lumpinee Stadium	Bangkok, Thailand	Decision	5	3:00
1988-10-19	Win	(Thailand) Kongnapa Lukthapfa	Rajadamnern Stadium	Bangkok, Thailand	Decision	5	3:00
1988-08-29	Win	(Thailand) Prasert Kittikasem		Bangkok, Thailand	Decision	5	3:00
1988-08-05	Win	(Thailand) Thawthong Lukdecha	Lumpinee Stadium	Bangkok, Thailand	Decision	5	3:00
1988-06-30	Loss	(Thailand) Wanpadet Phukrongfah	Rajadamnern Stadium	Bangkok, Thailand	Decision	5	3:00
1988-05-07	Win	(Thailand) Poolsawat Sitsornthong		Bangkok, Thailand	Decision	5	3:00
1988-03-21	Loss	(Thailand) Prasert Kittikasem	Rajadamnern Stadium	Bangkok, Thailand	Decision	5	3:00
1987-12-31	Win	(Thailand) Nokweed Devy		Bangkok, Thailand	TKO	5	
1987-11-26	Win	(Thailand) Jongrak Lukprabaht	Rajadamnern Stadium	Bangkok, Thailand	Decision	5	3:00
1987-10-29	Win	(Thailand) Chanchai Sor Tamarangsri	Rajadamnern Stadium	Bangkok, Thailand	Decision	5	3:00
1987-10-12	Win	(Thailand) Nokweed Devy	Rajadamnern Stadium	Bangkok, Thailand	TKO	4	
1987-08-24	Win	(Thailand) Rungnoi Chomputhong	Rajadamnern Stadium	Bangkok, Thailand	Decision	5	3:00
1987-04-29	Win	(Thailand) Sombat Sor.Thanikul	Rajadamnern Stadium	Bangkok, Thailand	Decision	5	3:00
1987-03-23	Win	(Thailand) Kongdej Chor.Wirach	Rajadamnern Stadium	Bangkok, Thailand	Decision	5	3:00
1987-02-26	Loss	(Thailand) Manasak Sor Ploenchit	Rajadamnern Stadium	Bangkok, Thailand	Decision	5	3:00
1986-12-22	Loss	(Thailand) Sombat Sor.Thanikul		Bangkok, Thailand	Decision	5	3:00
1986-11-11	Loss	(Thailand) Chamuakpetch Haphalung	Rajadamnern Stadium	Bangkok, Thailand	Decision	5	3:00
1986-09-08	Win	(Thailand) Jomwo Chernyim	Rajadamnern Stadium	Bangkok, Thailand	Decision	5	3:00
1986-08-11	Win	(Thailand) Singdaeng Kiatthaksin		Bangkok, Thailand	Decision	5	3:00
1986-05-29	Win	(Thailand) Pornsaknoi Sitchang	Rajadamnern Stadium	Bangkok, Thailand	Decision	5	3:00
1986-05-08	Win	(Thailand) Saphaphet Kiatphetnoi		Bangkok, Thailand	KO	2	
1986-04-04	Loss	(Thailand) Singdaeng Kiatthaksin	Lumpinee Stadium	Bangkok, Thailand	Decision	5	3:00
1986-03-17	Loss	(Thailand) Jampatong Na Nontachai	Rajadamnern Stadium	Bangkok, Thailand	Decision	5	3:00
1986-02-10	Loss	(Thailand) Manasak Sor Ploenchit	Rajadamnern Stadium	Bangkok, Thailand	Decision	5	3:00
1985-12-26	Win	(Thailand) Saencherng Pinsinchai	Rajadamnern Stadium	Bangkok, Thailand	Decision	5	3:00
1985-12-02	Win	(Thailand) Pornsaknoi Sitchang	Rajadamnern Stadium	Bangkok, Thailand	Decision	5	3:00
1985-10-24	Loss	(Thailand) Phanomgkon Hor.Mahachai		Bangkok, Thailand	Referee Stoppage	5	
1985-09-09	Win	(Thailand) Jack Kiatniwat	Rajadamnern Stadium	Bangkok, Thailand	Decision	5	3:00
1985-08-05	Loss	(Thailand) Jampatong Na Nontachai	Rajadamnern Stadium	Bangkok, Thailand	KO (Left High Kick)	3	
For the vacant Rajadamnern Stadium Bantamweight (118 lbs) title.
1985-07-01	Win	(Thailand) Nikhom Phetphothong	Rajadamnern Stadium	Bangkok, Thailand	Decision	5	3:00
1985-06-12	Win	(Thailand) Ruengchai Thairungruang	Rajadamnern Stadium	Thailand	Decision	5	3:00
1985-04-13	Win	(Thailand) Daradej Kietdaplung		Hat Yai, Thailand	Decision	5	3:00
1985-03-27	Win	(Thailand) Chokdee Kiatpayathai		Thailand	Decision	5	3:00
1985-03-03	Win	(Thailand) Kasemsan Sitloongtong		Thailand	Decision	5	3:00
1985-01-31	Loss	(Thailand) Jack Kiatniwat	Rajadamnern Stadium	Bangkok, Thailand	Decision	5	3:00
1985-01-12	Win	(Thailand) Boonchai Huasai		Songkhla, Thailand	Decision	5	3:00
1984-12-	Win	(Thailand) Prasert Kiatprapab	Lumpinee Stadium	Hat Yai, Thailand	Decision	5	3:00
1984-11-08	Win	(Thailand) Rungruang Kiattisakkongka		Thailand	KO	3	
1984-10-	Win	(Thailand) Ronnarong Kiatsamanchai		Roi Et, Thailand	Decision	5	3:00
1984-09-24	Win	(Thailand) Narak Sitkuanyim		Thailand	Decision	5	3:00
1984-08-27	Win	(Thailand) Thongnoi Pontawee		Thailand	Decision	5	3:00
1984-07-	Win	(Thailand) Kaennarong Na Nontachai		Nonthaburi, Thailand	Decision	5	3:00
1984-06-25	Win	(Thailand) Thanusuknoi SurasakGym		Thailand	Decision	5	3:00
1984-05-25	Win	(Thailand) Prasert Kiatprapab	Lumpinee Stadium	Bangkok, Thailand	Decision	5	3:00
1984-03-31	Loss	(Thailand) Pon Narupai	Lumpinee Stadium	Bangkok, Thailand	Decision	5	3:00
1984-03-05	Loss	(Thailand) Sarapetch Lukrangsri		Thailand	Decision	5	3:00
1984-01-16	Win	(Thailand) Payapnoi Sor.Thanikul		Thailand	Decision	5	3:00
Legend: Win Loss Draw/No contest Notes
