= Nokweed Devy =

Thai Muay Thai fighter (1965–2016)

- Nokweed in the late 1980s
- Born: Desh Sriampai (เดช ศรีอำไพ); August 19, 1965; Lang Suan, Chumphon, Thailand
- Died: August 31, 2016 (age 51); Ko Samui, Surat Thani, Thailand
- Native name: วิชิต สมบูรณ์
- Nickname: Chest-Shaking Master of Kicks (จอมเตะทรวงสะท้าน)
- Height: 177 cm (5 ft 10 in)
- Division: Super Bantamweight; Featherweight; Super Featherweight; Lightweight; Super Lightweight; Welterweight; Heavyweight
- Style: Muay Thai (Muay Tae)
- Stance: Orthodox
- Years active: c. 1972–2002

Other information
- Notable relatives: Santos Devy (younger brother); Paidang Lersakgym (younger brother)
- Notable students: Paul Slowinski; Dzhabar Askerov; Joanna Jędrzejczyk

Wichit Somboon (Thai: วิชิต สมบูรณ์; August 19, 1965 – August 31, 2016), known professionally as Nokweed Devy (Thai: นกหวีด เดวี่), was a Thai Muay Thai fighter and trainer. He was a three-division Rajadamnern Stadium champion who was famous in the 1980s and 1990s. Nicknamed the "Chest-Shaking Master of Kicks", he is often regarded as one of the most powerful kickers in the history of Muay Thai.

== Biography & career ==
Wichit Somboon (nicknamed Chit; ชิต) was born on August 19, 1965 in Langsuan, Chumphon but was raised in Sichon, Nakhon Si Thammarat in Thailand. He began training in Muay Thai at 11 years old under the guidance of his uncle at the Sak Udom camp. His younger brothers, Santos Devy and Paidang Lersak Gym, would also become Rajadamnern Stadium champions.

He won titles in three divisions at Rajadamnern Stadium while facing many notable fighters including Sagat Petchyindee, Samingnoom Sitboontam, Krongsak Sakkasem, Jomwo Chernyim, Wanpadej Phukrongfah, Sangtiennoi Sor.Rungroj, Issara Sakgreerin, Mungkorndum Sitchang, and Praedam Lukphrabath.

Nokweed was a heavy kick fighter, he was named the heaviest kick fighter of his era. He was also the primary Thai fighter who faced foreign fighters in K-1 matches, such as Jayson Vemoa, Jérôme Le Banner, Dany Bill, Faisal Zakaria, Stéphane Nikiéma, Paul Slowinski (who later became his student) and Jeff Ortzow, etc. His ring name "Nokweed" means "whistle" because when he kicked it made a whistling sound.

When he fought Jérôme Le Banner he weighed 72 kg while Jérôme weighed 107 kg, a 35 kg difference.

== Retirement & death ==
After retirement, he became a trainer and had a Muay Thai gym with his fellow southern fighter, Lakhin Vasansit at Ko Samui, Surat Thani province. Paidang and Nokkweed's gym was taken over by Punch it Switzerland 10 months after his death and has been run as Punch it Muaythai Gym since July 2017.

He died suddenly while training Muay Thai on the evening of August 31, 2016 at his gym, aged 51.

== Titles & honours ==
- Rajadamnern Stadium
  - 1984 Rajadamnern Super Bantamweight (122 lbs) Champion
  - 1985 Rajadamnern Featherweight (126 lbs) Champion
    - One successful title defense
  - 1985 Rajadamnern Super Featherweight (130 lbs) Champion
- World Muay Thai Council
  - WMC World Welterweight (147 lbs) Champion
- Regional
  - South Thailand Champion
- Awards
  - 1991 Sports Writers Association of Thailand Fight of the Year (vs Issara Sakgreerin)

== Fight record ==
Muay Thai Record (Incomplete)
Date	Result	Opponent	Event	Location	Method	Round	Time
2002-	Loss	(South Africa) Quentin Chong		Cape Town, South Africa	KO (Right Cross)		
For the WMC World title.
2002-	Loss	(Sudan) Faisal Zakaria	Chaweng Stadium	Ko Samui, Thailand	Decision	5	3:00
2002-05-07	Loss	(Poland) Paul Slowinski	Chaweng Stadium	Ko Samui, Thailand	KO (High kick)	4	
2002-04-00	Loss	(Poland) Paul Slowinski	Kanchanaburi Stadium	Bangkok, Thailand	KO (Punches)	2	
?	Win	(Italy) David Ismalone	Chaweng Stadium	Ko Samui	Decision	5	3:00
Wins 500, 000 baht side-bet.
1998-08-27	Loss	(New Zealand) Jayson Vemoa	New Zealand Vs Thailand	Auckland, New Zealand	Decision	5	3:00
?	Win	(New Zealand) Sam Master (?)	Songchai - New Zealand	New Zealand	TKO (High Kick)	2	
1995-03-23	Draw	(Japan) Taro Minato	K-LEAGUE KENZAN	Tokyo, Japan	Decision	5	3:00
1995-03-03	Loss	(France) Jérôme Le Banner	K-1 Grand Prix '95 Opening Battle	Tokyo, Japan	Decision (Unanimous)	5	3:00
1994-12-04	Win	(France) Stéphane Nikiéma	King's Birthday	Chiang Rai City, Thailand	Decision	5	3:00
1994-09-20	Loss	(France) Dany Bill	Muay Thai World Championships in Honor of His Majesty the King	Bangkok, Thailand	Decision	5	3:00
For the IMF World title. Originally a decision win for Nokweed, overturned 5 minutes later after a gamblers riot.
1991-05-24	Loss	(Thailand) Issara Sakgreerin	K-LEAGUE KENZAN	Tokyo, Japan	Decision	5	3:00
1991-02-15	Loss	(Thailand) Issara Sakgreerin	Muangchai Kittikasem vs Sot Chitalada	Ayutthaya Province, Thailand	Decision	5	3:00
1990-12-15	Win	(Netherlands) Gerald Zwane		Bangkok, Thailand	KO (Reverse Elbow)	3	
1990-01-04	Loss	(Thailand) Sangtiennoi Sor.Rungroj	Rajadamnern Stadium	Bangkok, Thailand	Decision	5	3:00
1989-12-06	Loss	(Thailand) Sangtiennoi Sor.Rungroj	Rajadamnern Stadium	Bangkok, Thailand	Decision	5	3:00
1989-11-11	Win	(United States) Jeff Ortzow		Phoenix, USA	TKO	4	
1989-10-18	Win	(Thailand) Sangtiennoi Sor.Rungroj	Rajadamnern Stadium	Bangkok, Thailand	Decision	5	3:00
1989-09-05	Draw	(Thailand) Sagat Petchyindee	AJKF "REAL BOUT"	Tokyo, Japan	Decision (Unanimous)	5	3:00
1989-07-26	Win	(Thailand) Mungkorndum SitChang	Rajadamnern Stadium	Bangkok, Thailand	KO (Punches)		
1989-03-18	Win	(Netherlands) Ivan Grande	AJKF	Tokyo, Japan	TKO	4	
1989-01-09	Win	(Thailand) Jomhod Kiatadisak		Phang Nga province, Thailand	KO	1	
1988-08-09	Win	(Thailand) Sagat Petchyindee	Samrong Stadium	Samut Prakan, Thailand	Decision	5	3:00
1988-03-28	Loss	(Thailand) Wanpadet Phukrongfah	Suekphetthongkham, Rajadamnern Stadium	Bangkok, Thailand	Decision (Unanimous)	5	3:00
For the Rajadamnern Stadium Lightweight (135 lbs) title.
1988-02-27	Win	(Thailand) Sanehngam Sakprasong	Na Thon Stadium	Surat Thani, Thailand	Decision	5	3:00
1987-12-31	Loss	(Thailand) Sangtiennoi Sor.Rungroj		Bangkok, Thailand	TKO	5	
1987-10-12	Loss	(Thailand) Sangtiennoi Sor.Rungroj	Rajadamnern Stadium	Bangkok, Thailand	TKO	4	
1987-08-24	Win	(Thailand) Kongdet Chor.Wirat	Rajadamnern Stadium	Bangkok, Thailand	KO	2	
1987-06-22	Win	(Thailand) Wanpadet Phukrongfah	Rajadamnern Stadium	Bangkok, Thailand	Decision	5	3:00
1987-06-04	Win	(Thailand) Praedam Lukprabat	Rajadamnern Stadium	Bangkok, Thailand	Decision	5	3:00
1986-12-23	Win	(Thailand) Wanpadet Phukrongfah		Bangkok, Thailand	Decision	5	3:00
1986-09-08	Win	(Thailand) Ponsaknoi Sitchang	Rajadamnern Stadium	Bangkok, Thailand	Decision	5	3:00
1986-07-23	Loss	(Thailand) Wanpadet Sitkhrumai	Rajadamnern Stadium	Bangkok, Thailand	Decision	5	3:00
Loses the Rajadamnern Stadium Super Featherweight (130 lbs) title.
1986-05-17	Win	(Thailand) Krongsak Sakkasem		Bangkok, Thailand	Decision	5	3:00
1986-03-25	Win	(Thailand) Sagat Petchyindee	Petchyindee, Lumpinee Stadium	Bangkok, Thailand	Decision (Unanimous)	5	3:00
1986-02-21	Win	(Thailand) Jomwo Chernyim	Rajadamnern Stadium	Bangkok, Thailand	Decision	5	3:00
1986-02-03	Win	(Thailand) Jomwo Chernyim	Rajadamnern Stadium	Bangkok, Thailand	Decision	5	3:00
1985-11-12	Win	(Thailand) Prasert Jitman	Rajadamnern Stadium	Bangkok, Thailand	Decision	5	3:00
1985-08-28	Win	(Thailand) Praedam Lukprabat	Rajadamnern Stadium	Bangkok, Thailand	Decision	5	3:00
Wins the Rajadamnern Stadium Super Featherweight (130 lbs) title.
1985-07-29	Win	(Thailand) Lom-Isan Sor.Thanikul	Rajadamnern Stadium	Bangkok, Thailand	TKO	4	
1985-06-24	Loss	(Thailand) Lom-Isan Sor.Thanikul	Rajadamnern Stadium	Bangkok, Thailand	Decision	5	3:00
Loses the Rajadamnern Stadium Featherweight (126 lbs) title.
1985-05-30	Win	(Thailand) Lom-Isan Sor.Thanikul	Rajadamnern Stadium	Bangkok, Thailand	Decision	5	3:00
Defends the Rajadamnern Featherweight (126 lbs) title.
1985-02-02	Win	(Thailand) Lom-Isan Sor.Thanikul		Hat Yai, Thailand	Decision	5	3:00
Wins the Rajadamnern Stadium Featherweight (126 lbs) title.
1985-01-25	Win	(Thailand) Kulabkhao Na Nontachai	Rajadamnern Stadium	Bangkok, Thailand	Decision	5	3:00
1984-	Win	(Thailand) Kengkla Sitseir	Rajadamnern Stadium	Bangkok, Thailand	Decision	5	3:00
1984-12-02	Win	(Thailand) Wanpadet Sitkhrumai	Wanwuttichai	Hat Yai, Thailand	Decision	5	3:00
1984-11-21	Loss	(Thailand) Lom-Isan Sor.Thanikul	Rajadamnern Stadium	Bangkok, Thailand	Decision	5	3:00
1984-10-08	Loss	(Thailand) Lom-Isan Sor.Thanikul	Rajadamnern Stadium	Bangkok, Thailand	Decision	5	3:00
For the Rajadamnern Stadium Featherweight (126 lbs) title.
1984-09-08	Win	(Thailand) Singdaeng Kietadee		Hat Yai, Thailand	Decision	5	3:00
1984-08-23	Win	(Thailand) Samingnoom Sithiboontham	Rajadamnern Stadium	Bangkok, Thailand	Decision	5	3:00
1984-07-25	Win	(Thailand) Kengkatnoi Kiatniwat		Thailand	Decision	5	3:00
1984-06-16	Win	(Thailand) Phanmongkol Hor.Mahachai		Nakhon Si Thammarat, Thailand	Decision (Unanimous)	5	3:00
Wins the vacant Rajadamnern Stadium Super Bantamweight (122 lbs) title.
1984-05-10	Loss	(Thailand) Nikhom Phetphothong		Thailand	Decision	5	3:00
1984-04-	Win	(Thailand) Saifon Lukkabu		Yala, Thailand	Decision	5	3:00
1984-03-22	Win	(Thailand) Dang Lukbanphra	Rajadamnern Stadium	Bangkok, Thailand	Decision	5	3:00
1984-02-11	Win	(Thailand) Ruengnarong Thairungruang		Nakhon Si Thammarat, Thailand	Decision	5	3:00
1984-01-28	Win	(Thailand) Daradej Kiatpraphaeng		Songkhla, Thailand	Decision	5	3:00
1983-11-27	Loss	(Thailand) Phayanoi Sor.Thasanee	Payao Poontarat vs Rafael Orono	Pattaya, Thailand	Decision (Unanimous)	5	3:00
For the Rajadamnern Stadium Super Flyweight (115 lbs) title.
1983-09-30	Win	(Thailand) Ruengchai Thairungruang		Nakhon Si Thammarat, Thailand	Decision	5	3:00
1983-09-	Win	(Thailand) Daradej Kiatpraphaeng		Songkhla, Thailand	TKO	3	
1983-09-09	Win	(Thailand) Phodam Sor.Sermpong		Thailand	Referee stoppage	5	
1983-07-23	Win	(Thailand) Wangtae Luklongtan		Thailand	Decision	5	3:00
1983-07-18	Win	(Thailand) Jongangnoi Singkhongkha		Thailand	Decision	5	3:00
1983-06-	Win	(Thailand) Prabphipop Lukklongtan		Krabi, Thailand	Decision	5	3:00
1983-06-02	Win	(Thailand) Tongchai Charoenmuang		Thailand	Decision	5	3:00
1983-04-30	Win	(Thailand) Chatchai Singkhiri		Thailand	Decision	5	3:00
1983-04-29	Win	(Thailand) Muangnamnoi Dejrita		Hat Yai, Thailand	Decision	5	3:00
1983-04-13	Win	(Thailand) Thuk Charoenmueang		Thailand	Decision	5	3:00
1983-02-13	Win	(Thailand) Pansak Sakwithi		Nakhon Si Thammarat, Thailand	Decision	5	3:00
1983-01-20	Win	(Thailand) Praethong Pornniwat		Thailand	Decision	5	3:00
?	Win	(Thailand) Jomhod Kiatadisak		Thailand	KO	3	
Wins the South Thailand title.
Legend: Win Loss Draw/No contest Notes
