= Petchdam Lukborai =

Thai former professional Muay Thai fighter

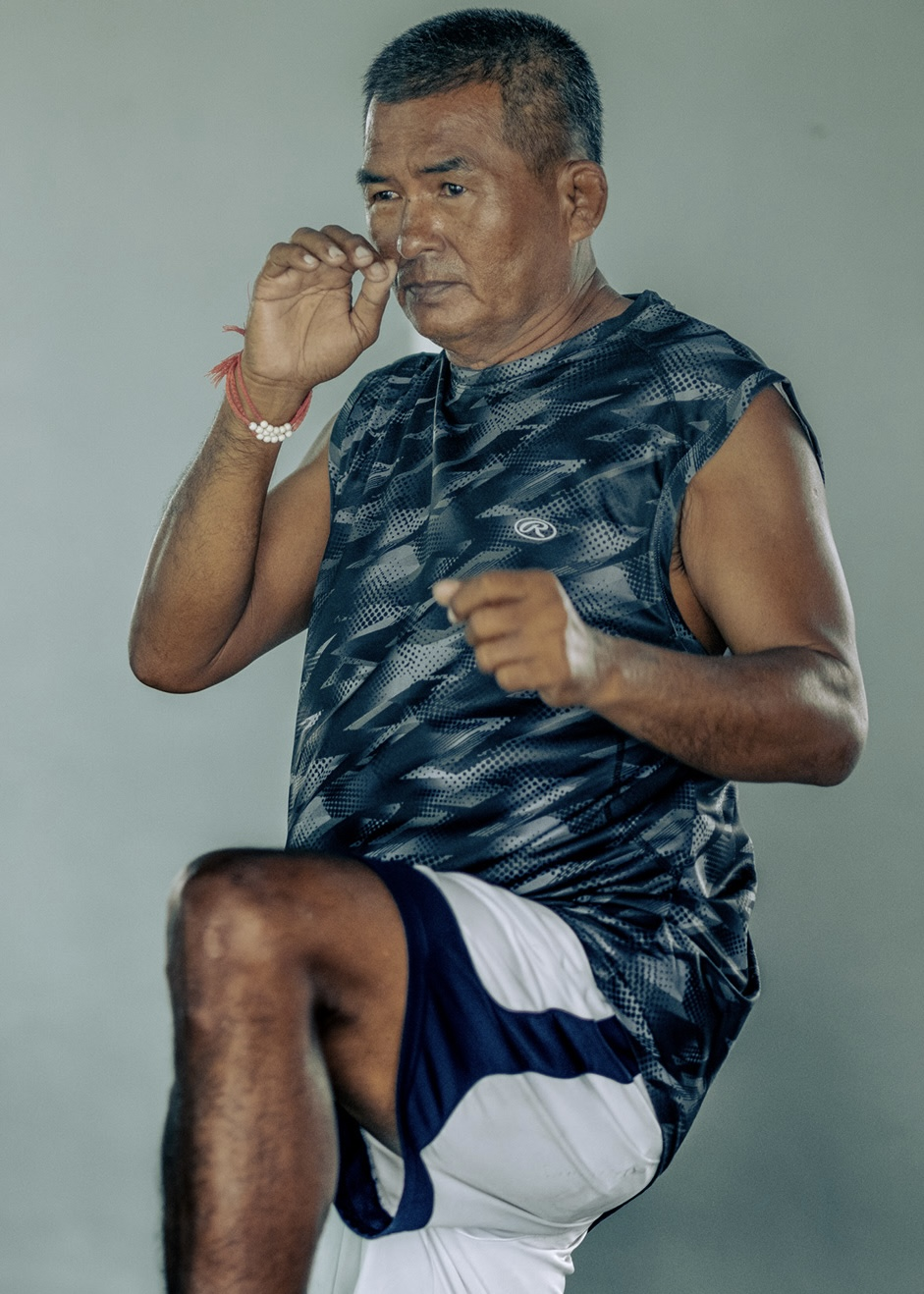
- Petchdam in 2023
- Born: Preecha Phromprasit; June 5, 1963; Lopburi, Thailand
- Native name: ปรีชา พรหมประสิทธิ
- Other names: Petchdam Sor.Bodin (เพชรดำ ส.บดินทร์); Petchdam Sityodtong (เพชรดำ ศิษย์ยอดธง)
- Nickname: Lord Cannibal Knees (ขุนเข่ากินคน)
- Height: 171 cm (5 ft 7 in)
- Division: Flyweight; Bantamweight; Super Bantamweight; Featherweight; Lightweight; Welterweight
- Style: Muay Thai (Muay Khao)
- Stance: Orthodox
- Team: Lukborai Gym; Sityodtong Gym
- Trainer: Yodtong Senanan
- Years active: c. 1976–1993

Other information
- Occupation: Muay Thai fighter (retired); Trader (current)
- Children: 2 (one son, one daughter)

Preecha Phromprasit (Thai: ปรีชา พรหมประสิทธิ; born June 5, 1963), known professionally as Petchdam Lukborai (Thai: เพชรดำ ลูกบ่อไร่) is a Thai former professional Muay Thai fighter. He is a former four-division Lumpinee Stadium champion who was famous during the 1980s and 1990s. Nicknamed "Lord Cannibal Knees", he was known for his technical ability and precise knees.

== Biography and career ==
Preecha Phromprasit was born on June 5, 1963 in Lopburi, Thailand but grew up in the province of Chanthaburi. He fought for the first time when he was about 13 years old at a local temple fair, earning 50 baht.

He had about 45 fights in various provinces before reaching the prestigious national stadiums, such as the Rajadamnern and Lumpinee Boxing Stadiums.

During the heyday of his career, he fought against many top Muay Thai fighters, such as Kongtoranee Payakaroon, Samransak Muangsurin, Chanchai Sor.Tamarangsri, Orono Por.MuangUbon, Jaroenthong Kiatbanchong, Namphon Nongkeepahuyuth, Namkabuan Nongkeepahuyuth, Panomtuanlek Hapalang, Cherry Sor.Wanich, Jomwo Chernyim, Superlek Sorn E-Sarn, Chandet Sor.Prantalay, Wangchannoi Sor.Palangchai, Sangtiennoi Sor.Rungroj, and Jongsanan Fairtex. His highest purse reached 200,000 baht in his fight with Kongtoranee Payakaroon.

He was given the nickname "Lord Cannibal Knees" after five of his opponents were kicked off the ring by the referee while fighting him.

His last fight took place in 1993. After retirement, he opened a Muay Thai gym in his native Chanthaburi. He had two children. Petchdam is currently working as a merchant selling steamed buns in Rayong's Samyan market, without being involved in Muay Thai at all.

== Titles and honours ==
- Lumpinee Stadium
  - 1983 Lumpinee Stadium Flyweight (112 lbs) Champion
  - 1984 Lumpinee Stadium Bantamweight (118 lbs) Champion
  - 1990 Lumpinee Stadium Featherweight (126 lbs) Champion
  - 1993 Lumpinee Stadium Lightweight (135 lbs) Champion
    - One successful title defense

== Muay Thai record ==
Muay Thai Record
Date	Result	Opponent	Event	Location	Method	Round	Time
1993-11-27	Loss	(Thailand) Panomrunglek Chor.Sawat	Lumpinee Stadium	Bangkok, Thailand	Decision	5	3:00
Loses the Lumpinee Stadium Lightweight (135 lbs) title.
1993-10-30	Win	(Thailand) Orono Por.MuangUbon	Lumpinee Stadium	Bangkok, Thailand	Decision	5	3:00
Defends the Lumpinee Stadium Lightweight (135 lbs) title.
1993-06-11	Loss	(Thailand) Jaroenthong Kiatbanchong	Lumpinee Stadium	Bangkok, Thailand	Decision	5	3:00
1993-05-04	Loss	(Thailand) Chandet Sor.Prantalay	Lumpinee Stadium	Bangkok, Thailand	Decision	5	3:00
1993-04-06	Win	(Thailand) Panomrunglek Chor.Sawat	Lumpinee Stadium	Bangkok, Thailand	Decision	5	3:00
Wins the Lumpinee Stadium Lightweight (135 lbs) title.
1992-07-21	Loss	(Thailand) Jongsanan Fairtex	Lumpinee Stadium	Bangkok, Thailand	KO (Punches)	3	
1992-06-13	Win	(Thailand) Sangtiennoi Sor.Rungroj	Lumpinee Stadium	Bangkok, Thailand	Decision	5	3:00
1992-05-01	Win	(Thailand) Sangtiennoi Sor.Rungroj	Lumpinee Stadium	Bangkok, Thailand	Decision	5	3:00
1992-02-07	Win	(Thailand) Sanit Wichitkriengkrai	Lumpinee Stadium	Bangkok, Thailand	Decision	5	3:00
1991-12-28	Win	(Thailand) Panomrunglek Chor.Sawat	Lumpinee Stadium	Bangkok, Thailand	Decision	5	3:00
1991-11-05	Win	(Thailand) Jirasak Por.Pongsawang	Lumpinee Stadium	Bangkok, Thailand	Decision	5	3:00
1991-09-17	Win	(Thailand) Kaonar Sor.Kettalingchan	Lumpinee Stadium	Bangkok, Thailand	Decision	5	3:00
1991-08-06	Loss	(Thailand) Wangchannoi Sor.Palangchai	Lumpinee Stadium	Bangkok, Thailand	KO (Punches)	1	
For a 1 million baht side-bet.
1991-07-02	Loss	(Thailand) Namkabuan Nongkeepahuyuth	Lumpinee Stadium	Bangkok, Thailand	Decision	5	3:00
For a 6.5 million baht side-bet.
1991-05-10	Win	(Thailand) Superlek Sornisaan	Lumpinee Stadium	Bangkok, Thailand	Decision	5	3:00
Wins 1 million baht side-bet.
1991-03-29	Win	(Thailand) Panomrunglek Chor.Sawat	Lumpinee Stadium	Bangkok, Thailand	Decision	5	3:00
1991-03-02	Win	(Thailand) Seenin Phetviharn	Lumpinee Stadium	Bangkok, Thailand	Decision	5	3:00
1991-02-02	Win	(Thailand) Seenin Phetviharn	Lumpinee Stadium	Bangkok, Thailand	Decision	5	3:00
1991-01-04	Loss	(Thailand) Namphon Nongkeepahuyuth	Lumpinee Stadium	Bangkok, Thailand	Decision	5	3:00
1990-12-04	Loss	(Thailand) Panomrunglek Chor.Sawat	Lumpinee Stadium	Bangkok, Thailand	Decision	5	3:00
1990-11-16	Win	(Thailand) Chumphuang Chomphuthong	Lumpinee Stadium	Bangkok, Thailand	KO (Head kick)	3	
1990-10-30	Win	(Thailand) Koratnoi Sakphiphat		Thailand	Decision	5	3:00
1990-08-21	Loss	(Thailand) Panomrunglek Chor.Sawat	Lumpinee Stadium	Bangkok, Thailand	Decision	5	3:00
1990-06-30	Loss	(Thailand) Therdkiat Sitthepitak	Lumpinee Stadium	Bangkok, Thailand	Decision	5	3:00
Loses the Lumpinee Stadium Featherweight (126lbs) title.
1990-06-08	Loss	(Thailand) Jaroenthong Kiatbanchong	Lumpinee Stadium	Bangkok, Thailand	Decision	5	3:00
1990-05-18	Win	(Thailand) Namphon Nongkeepahuyuth	MAJKF	Tokyo, Japan	Decision	5	3:00
1990-04-24	Loss	(Thailand) Cherry Sor.Wanich	Lumpinee Stadium	Bangkok, Thailand	Decision	5	3:00
1990-03-30	Win	(Thailand) Namphon Nongkeepahuyuth	Lumpinee Stadium	Bangkok, Thailand	Decision	5	3:00
Wins the Lumpinee Stadium Featherweight (126lbs) title.
1990-02-18	Loss	(Netherlands) Brian Pieters	Holland vs Thailand 1990	Amsterdam, Netherlands	Decision	5	3:00
For the vacant I.M.T.F. Welterweight (147 lbs) World title.
1990-02-06	Win	(Thailand) Jaroenthong Kiatbanchong	Lumpinee Stadium	Bangkok, Thailand	Decision	5	3:00
Wins 1 million baht side-bet.
1990-01-19	Loss	(Thailand) Jaroenthong Kiatbanchong	Lumpinee Stadium	Bangkok, Thailand	Decision	5	3:00
1989-11-28	Loss	(Thailand) Jaroenthong Kiatbanchong	Lumpinee Stadium	Bangkok, Thailand	Decision	5	3:00
1989-11-08	Win	(Thailand) Jaroenthong Kiatbanchong	Lumpinee Stadium	Bangkok, Thailand	Decision	5	3:00
1989-05-02	Loss	(Thailand) Jaroenthong Kiatbanchong	Lumpinee Stadium	Bangkok, Thailand	Decision	5	3:00
1989-04-07	Loss	(Thailand) Manasak Sor.Ploenchit	Lumpinee Stadium	Bangkok, Thailand	Decision	5	3:00
1989-01-31	Loss	(Thailand) Chanchai Sor.Tamarangsri	Lumpinee Stadium	Bangkok, Thailand	Decision	5	3:00
1988-12-02	Win	(Thailand) Kongtoranee Payakaroon	Lumpinee Stadium	Bangkok, Thailand	Decision	5	3:00
1988-11-03	Win	(Thailand) Jomwo Chernyim	Rajadamnern Stadium	Bangkok, Thailand	Decision	5	3:00
1988-09-27	Win	(Thailand) Sanphet Lukrangsi	Lumpinee Stadium	Bangkok, Thailand	Decision	5	3:00
1988-04-02	Win	(Thailand) Samransak Muangsurin	WKA Ikki Kajiwara Memorial Show '88	Tokyo, Japan	Decision	5	3:00
1987-10-27	Loss	(Thailand) Panomtuanlek Hapalang	Lumpinee Stadium	Bangkok, Thailand	Decision	5	3:00
For the vacant Lumpinee Stadium Super Bantamweight (122lbs) title.
1987-08-28	Loss	(Thailand) Jomwo Chernyim	Lumpinee Stadium	Bangkok, Thailand	KO (High kick and punches)	4	
Wins 1.7 million baht side-bet.
1987-07-24	Win	(Thailand) Jomwo Chernyim		Bangkok, Thailand	Decision	5	3:00
For a 400,000 baht side-bet.
1987-05-15	Win	(Thailand) Prasert Kittikasem	Chaomangkon, Lumpinee Stadium	Bangkok, Thailand	Decision	5	3:00
1987-04-10	Loss	(Thailand) Jomwo Chernyim	Lumpinee Stadium	Bangkok, Thailand	KO	4	
Wins a 1.2 million baht side-bet.
1986-10-14	Win	(Thailand) Daengnoi Lukphrabat	Onesongchai, Lumpinee Stadium	Bangkok, Thailand	Decision	5	3:00
1986-08-19	Win	(Thailand) Phadam Lukbangbor	Lumpinee Stadium	Bangkok, Thailand	Decision	5	3:00
1986-01-10	Loss	(Thailand) Jongrak Lukprabaht	Lumpinee Stadium	Bangkok, Thailand	Decision	5	3:00
1985-12-06	Loss	(Thailand) Yoknoi Fairtex	Lumpinee Stadium	Bangkok, Thailand	KO (Punches)	2	
1985-09-03	Loss	(Thailand) Chanchai Sor.Tamarangsri	Lumpinee Stadium	Bangkok, Thailand	Decision	5	3:00
For the Lumpinee Stadium Bantamweight (118 lbs) title.
1985-08-06	Loss	(Thailand) Bandon Sitbangprachan	Lumpinee Stadium	Bangkok, Thailand	Decision	5	3:00
1985-06-04	Loss	(Thailand) Pornsaknoi Sitchang	Lumpinee Stadium	Bangkok, Thailand	Decision	5	3:00
1985-02-08	Loss	(Thailand) Maewnoi Sitchang	Lumpinee Stadium	Bangkok, Thailand	Decision	5	3:00
Loses the Lumpinee Stadium Bantamweight (118 lbs) title.
1984-12-18	Loss	(Thailand) Samransak Muangsurin	Lumpinee Stadium	Bangkok, Thailand	Decision	5	3:00
1984-11-09	Loss	(Thailand) Kongtoranee Payakaroon	Lumpinee Stadium	Bangkok, Thailand	Decision	5	3:00
1984-09-14	Win	(Thailand) Kongtoranee Payakaroon	Lumpinee Stadium	Bangkok, Thailand	Decision	5	3:00
Wins the Lumpinee Stadium Bantamweight (118 lbs) title.
1984-06-29	Win	(Thailand) Palannoi Kiatanan	Lumpinee Stadium	Bangkok, Thailand	Decision	5	3:00
1984-03-09	Loss	(Thailand) Kongtoranee Payakaroon	Lumpinee Stadium	Bangkok, Thailand	KO (Punches)	3	
For the Lumpinee Stadium Bantamweight (118 lbs) title.
1984-01-24	Win	(Thailand) Samransak Muangsurin	Lumpinee Stadium	Bangkok, Thailand	Decision	5	3:00
1983-12-27	NC	(Thailand) Rung Sakprasong	Lumpinee Stadium	Bangkok, Thailand	Petchdam dismissed	5	
1983-11-11	Win	(Thailand) Makhamphet Rojasongkhram	Lumpinee Stadium	Bangkok, Thailand	Decision	5	3:00
Wins the vacant Lumpinee Stadium Flyweight (112 lbs) title.
1983-10-04	NC	(Thailand) Wisanupon Saksamut	Lumpinee Stadium	Bangkok, Thailand	Wisanupon dismissed	5	
1983-08-26	Win	(Thailand) Wanmai Phetbundit	Lumpinee Stadium	Bangkok, Thailand	Decision	5	3:00
1983-07-05	Win	(Thailand) Nopchai Lukmingkwan	Lumpinee Stadium	Bangkok, Thailand	Decision	5	3:00
1983-06-07	Win	(Thailand) Phaothai Luknonmuang	Lumpinee Stadium	Bangkok, Thailand	Phaothai dismissed	5	
1983-04-22	Win	(Thailand) Thanupetch Petchkriangkrai	Lumpinee Stadium	Bangkok, Thailand	Decision	5	3:00
1983-04-05	Loss	(Thailand) Sornnarainoi Sakwittaya	Lumpinee Stadium	Bangkok, Thailand	Decision	5	3:00
1983-01-28	Win	(Thailand) Kanongsuk Sitomnoi	Lumpinee Stadium	Bangkok, Thailand	Decision	5	3:00
1982-12-07	Win	(Thailand) Jomhod Luksamrong	Lumpinee Stadium	Bangkok, Thailand	Decision	5	3:00
1982-09-06	Win	(Thailand) Ronnarong Daenphuthai	Rajadamnern Stadium	Bangkok, Thailand	Decision	5	3:00
1982-08-10	Win	(Thailand) Phongsant Ekayothin	Lumpinee Stadium	Bangkok, Thailand	Decision	5	3:00
Legend: Win Loss Draw/No contest Notes

== Professional boxing record ==
1 fight	0 wins	1 loss
By knockout	0	1

No.	Result	Record	Opponent	Type	Round, time	Date	Location	Notes
1	Loss	1–0	Bandon Sitbangprachan	KO	5 (6)	30 May 1989	Lumpinee Stadium, Bangkok, Thailand	
