= Namphon Nongkeepahuyuth =

Thai professional Muay Thai fighter (1969–2016)

- Namphon in the late 1980s or early 1990s
- Born: Namphon Sijantuek; May 19, 1969; Nong Ki, Buriram, Thailand
- Died: September 19, 2016 (aged 47); Nang Rong Hospital, Nang Rong, Buriram, Thailand
- Native name: นำพล หนองกี่พาหุยุทธ
- Other names: The Decaying-Face Knee Striker (ขุนเข่าหน้าเปื่อย)
- Height: 173 cm (5 ft 8 in)
- Division: Light Flyweight; Featherweight; Super Lightweight
- Style: Muay Thai (Muay Bouk / Muay Khao)
- Stance: Orthodox
- Team: Nongkeepahuyuth Gym; Muangsurin Gym
- Trainer: Pramote Hoymook
- Years active: 1980s–1993

Other information
- Notable relatives: Namkabuan Nongkeepahuyuth (younger brother)

Namphon Sijantuek (Thai: นำพล สีจันทึก; May 19, 1969 – September 19, 2016), known professionally as Namphon Nongkeepahuyuth (Thai: นำพล หนองกี่พาหุยุทธ), was a Thai professional Muay Thai fighter. He was a three-division Lumpinee Stadium champion who was famous in the 1980s and 1990s. He was also the elder brother of Namkabuan Nongkeepahuyuth, another famous Thai fighter.

== Biography and career ==
Namphon (nickname: Khaek; แขก) was born on 19 May 1969 in Tambon Jan Tuek, Nong Ki District, Buriram Province. He practiced Muay Thai as a child with a training and supporting from Pramote Hoymook, a local physical education teacher who owns a Muay Thai gym "Nongkeepahuyuth". He became successful and famous in Surin and Nakhon Ratchasima before going to fight in Bangkok where he become a Muay Thai superstar from 1988–1991.

He fought with many famous Muay Thai kickboxers at that time, such as Samart Payakaroon, Cherry Sor Wanich, Sangtiennoi Sor.Rungroj, Petchdam Lukborai, Panomtoanlek Sor. Sirinan, Nuathoranee Tongraja, Superlek Sorn E-Sarn, Jaroenthong Kiatbanchong, Samranthong Kiatbanchong, Pompetch Naratreekul, Orono Por Muang Ubon, and especially with Cherry Sor Wanich who was considered his main rival, and Samart Payakaroon who he fought five times though he only beat him once.

He won championships of Lumpinee Stadium at Junior flyweight (108 lbs) and Featherweight (126 lbs). He often fought as the main event in the title "Suek Onesongchai" by Songchai Rattanasuban as promoter. His highest purse was 240,000–260,000 baht. Namphon was a favourite with Muay Thai fans due to his fighting style, and especially for his fiercest weapon, a knee strike, for which he was given the nickname the "Decaying-Face Knee Striker" because of his prowess at knees and because he often had bloody wounds after his fights, especially on his face or eyebrows. Throughout his career it was recorded that he had been given 268 stitches and at one time as many 72 stitches.

In 1990 Namphon fought against Ramon Dekkers of the Netherlands twice. In the first bout, he was defeated by unanimous decision in Amsterdam, Netherlands, but he won the rematch at Lumpinee Stadium, Bangkok.

== Retirement and death ==
In 1993, Namphon suffered a car accident, while still at the high point of his fighting career. He retired two years later at 26 years old.

After retirement, he opened a short-lived mu kratha restaurant in Nakhon Ratchasima. Later, he returned to live in his native Buriram, living a simple life and training children in muay Thai in his old gym.

In 2013, he became ill with pneumonitis from too much drinking and smoking for many years, until his body became very thin. Namphon died at Nang Rong Hospital at 17:00 on 19 September 2016, when he was 47 years old.

== Titles and accomplishments ==
- Lumpinee Stadium
  - 1986 Lumpinee Stadium Light Flyweight (108 lbs) Champion
  - 1987 Lumpinee Stadium Light Flyweight (108 lbs) Champion
  - 1989 Lumpinee Stadium Featherweight (126 lbs) Champion
    - Two successful title defenses

== Fight record ==
Muay Thai record
Date	Result	Opponent	Event	Location	Method	Round	Time
1995-09-02	Loss	(Thailand) Jompoplek Sor.Sumalee		Ubon Ratchathani, Thailand	Decision	5	3:00
1995-07-21	Loss	(Thailand) Rainbow Sor.Prantalay	Lumpinee Stadium	Bangkok, Thailand	Decision	5	3:00
1995-03-29	Loss	(Thailand) Kongnapa BM Service	Rajadamnern Stadium	Bangkok, Thailand	KO (High kick)	5	
1995-02-15	Win	(Thailand) Padejseuk Kiatsamran	Rajadamnern Stadium	Bangkok, Thailand	Decision	5	3:00
1995-01-09	Loss	(Thailand) Rainbow Sor.Prantalay	Rajadamnern Stadium	Bangkok, Thailand	KO (High kick)	4	
1994-11-26	Loss	(Thailand) Orono Por.MuangUbon	Lumpinee Stadium	Bangkok, Thailand	Decision	5	3:00
1994-	Win	(Thailand) Chandet Sor Prantalay	Lumpinee Stadium	Bangkok, Thailand	Decision	5	3:00
1994-	Win	(Thailand) Pompetch Naratrikul	Lumpinee Stadium	Bangkok, Thailand	Decision	5	3:00
1994-	Loss	(Thailand) Chandet Sor Prantalay	Lumpinee Stadium	Bangkok, Thailand	Decision	5	3:00
1994-05-31	Win	(Thailand) Pompetch Naratrikul	Lumpinee Stadium	Bangkok, Thailand	Decision	5	3:00
1994-04-22	Win	(Thailand) Pompetch Naratrikul	Lumpinee Stadium	Bangkok, Thailand	Decision	5	3:00
1994-03-29	Loss	(Thailand) Kongnapa BM Service	Lumpinee Stadium	Bangkok, Thailand	Decision	5	3:00
1994-03-	Win	(Thailand) Taweechai Wor.Preecha	Rajadamnern Stadium	Bangkok, Thailand	Decision	5	3:00
1994-01-24	Win	(Thailand) Sisod Kiatchitchanok	Rajadamnern Stadium	Bangkok, Thailand	Decision	5	3:00
1994-01-	Win	(Thailand) Wanlop Sor.Thepthong	Rajadamnern Stadium	Bangkok, Thailand	KO	1	
1993-12-23	Win	(Thailand) Orono Por.MuangUbon	Lumpinee Stadium	Bangkok, Thailand	Decision	5	3:00
1993-11-23	Loss	(Thailand) Pompetch Naratreekul	Lumpinee Stadium	Bangkok, Thailand	Decision	5	3:00
1993-10-22	Win	(Thailand) Kaonar Sor.Kettalingchan	Lumpinee Stadium	Bangkok, Thailand	Decision	5	3:00
1992-09-11	Loss	(Thailand) Buakaw Por.Pisichet	Lumpinee Stadium	Bangkok, Thailand	Decision	5	3:00
1992-08-07	Loss	(Thailand) Superlek Sornisaan	Lumpinee Stadium	Bangkok, Thailand	KO	4	
1991-12-	Loss	(Thailand) Sangtiennoi Sor.Rungroj	Lumpinee Stadium	Bangkok, Thailand	Decision	5	3:00
1991-11-26	Loss	(Thailand) Sangtiennoi Sor.Rungroj	Lumpinee Stadium	Bangkok, Thailand	Decision	5	3:00
1991-11-03	Win	(Thailand) Sanit Wichitkriengkrai		New Zealand	Decision	5	3:00
1991-10-15	Win	(Thailand) Sanit Wichitkriengkrai	Lumpinee Stadium	Bangkok, Thailand	Decision	5	3:00
1991-08-14	Win	(Thailand) Jaroenthong Kiatbanchong	Rajadamnern Stadium	Bangkok, Thailand	Decision	5	3:00
1991-07-30	Loss	(Thailand) Superlek Sornisaan	Lumpinee Stadium	Bangkok, Thailand	Decision	5	3:00
1991-06-28	Win	(Thailand) Panomrunglek Chor.Sawat	Lumpinee Stadium	Bangkok, Thailand	Decision	5	3:00
1991-06-14	Win	(Thailand) Nongmoon Chomphutong	Lumpinee Stadium	Bangkok, Thailand	Decision	5	3:00
1991-03-29	Loss	(Thailand) Superlek Sornisaan	Lumpinee Stadium	Bangkok, Thailand	Decision	5	3:00
1991-03-01	Win	(Thailand) Therdkiat Sitthepitak	Lumpinee Stadium	Bangkok, Thailand	KO	4	
1991-02-09	Draw	(Thailand) Nuathoranee Sor.Kettalingchan	Lumpinee Stadium	Bangkok, Thailand	Decision	5	3:00
1991-01-21	Win	(Thailand) Nuathoranee Sor.Kettalingchan	Lumpinee Stadium	Bangkok, Thailand	Decision	5	3:00
1991-01-04	Win	(Thailand) Petchdam Lukborai	Lumpinee Stadium	Bangkok, Thailand	Decision	5	3:00
1990-12-15	Win	(Thailand) Chumpuang Chomphuong		Tokyo	KO	2	
1990-11-20	Loss	(Thailand) Panomrunglek Chor.Sawat	Lumpinee Stadium	Bangkok, Thailand	TKO (Doctor stoppage)	4	
1990-10-07	Loss	(Thailand) Jaroenthong Kiatbanchong	OneSongchai	New Zealand	Decision	5	3:00
For the WMC World Lightweight (135 lbs) title.
1990-08-15	Loss	(Thailand) Kongnapa Luktapfah	Rajadamnern Stadium	Bangkok, Thailand	KO	1	
1990-07-29	Win	(Sweden) Dennis Sigo		England	TKO (low kick)	4	
1990-06-29	Loss	(Thailand) Superlek Sornisaan	Lumpinee Stadium	Bangkok, Thailand	Decision	5	3:00
1990-05-18	Loss	(Thailand) Petchdam Sor.Bodin	MAJKF	Tokyo, Japan	Decision	5	3:00
1990-04-20	Win	(Netherlands) Ramon Dekkers	Lumpinee Stadium	Bangkok, Thailand	Decision	5	3:00
1990-03-30	Loss	(Thailand) Petchdam Sor.Bodin	Lumpinee Stadium	Bangkok, Thailand	Decision	5	3:00
Loses the Lumpinee Stadium Featherweight (126 lbs) title.
1990-02-18	Loss	(Netherlands) Ramon Dekkers		Amsterdam, Netherlands	Decision (Unanimous)	5	3:00
For the IMF World Light Welterweight title.
1990-02-06	Loss	(Thailand) Cherry Sor.Wanich	Lumpinee Stadium	Bangkok, Thailand	Decision	5	3:00
1990-01-19	Draw	(Thailand) Cherry Sor.Wanich	Lumpinee Stadium	Bangkok, Thailand	Decision	5	3:00
For the Lumpinee Stadium Super Featherweight (130 lbs) title.
1989-12-31	Win	(France) Pascal Gregoire		Paris, France	TKO (Low kick)	4	
1989-11-28	Draw	(Thailand) Cherry Sor.Wanich	Lumpinee Stadium	Bangkok, Thailand	Decision	5	3:00
1989-11-07	Draw	(Thailand) Cherry Sor.Wanich	Lumpinee Stadium	Bangkok, Thailand	Decision	5	3:00
1989-10-06	Win	(Thailand) Jaroenthong Kiatbanchong	Lumpinee Stadium	Bangkok, Thailand	Decision	5	3:00
Defends the Lumpinee Stadium Featherweight (126 lbs) title.
1989-09-08	Win	(Thailand) Chanchai Sor.Tamarangsri	Lumpinee Stadium	Bangkok, Thailand	Decision	5	3:00
1989-08-15	Win	(Thailand) Manasak Sor.Ploenchit	Lumpinee Stadium	Bangkok, Thailand	Decision	5	3:00
1989-06-26	Loss	(Thailand) Cherry Sor.Wanich	Rajadamnern Stadium	Bangkok, Thailand	Decision	5	3:00
1989-05-30	Win	(Thailand) Sanphet Lokrangsee	Lumpinee Stadium	Bangkok, Thailand	Decision	5	3:00
Defends the Lumpinee Stadium Featherweight (126 lbs) title.
1989-04-07	Loss	(Thailand) Jaroenthong Kiatbanchong	Lumpinee Stadium	Bangkok, Thailand	TKO	3	
1989-03-10	Win	(Thailand) Jaroenthong Kiatbanchong	Lumpinee Stadium	Bangkok, Thailand	Decision	5	3:00
Wins the Lumpinee Stadium Featherweight (126 lbs) title.
1989-01-23	Loss	(Thailand) Jomwo Chernyim	Rajadamnern Stadium	Bangkok, Thailand	Decision	5	3:00
1989-01-06	Draw	(Thailand) Jomwo Chernyim	Lumpinee Stadium	Bangkok, Thailand	Decision	5	3:00
1988-12-02	Loss	(Thailand) Samart Payakaroon	Lumpinee Stadium	Bangkok, Thailand	Decision	5	3:00
1988-10-28	Loss	(Thailand) Samart Payakaroon	Lumpinee Stadium	Bangkok, Thailand	TKO (Doctor Stoppage)	3	
1988-08-05	Win	(Thailand) Kongtoranee Payakaroon	Lumpinee Stadium	Bangkok, Thailand	Decision	5	3:00
1988-07-26	Win	(Thailand) Kongtoranee Payakaroon	Lumpinee Stadium	Bangkok, Thailand	Decision	5	3:00
1988-06-24	Win	(Thailand) Manasak Sor.Ploenchit	Lumpinee Stadium	Bangkok, Thailand	Decision	5	3:00
1988-05-03	Loss	(Thailand) Panomtuanlek Hapalang	Lumpinee Stadium	Bangkok, Thailand	TKO (Knees)	3	
For the Lumpinee Stadium Featherweight (126 lbs) title.
1988-03-04	Draw	(Thailand) Jomwo Chernyim	Lumpinee Stadium	Bangkok, Thailand	Decision	5	3:00
1988-01-26	Win	(Thailand) Sanit Wichitkriengkrai	Lumpinee Stadium	Bangkok, Thailand	TKO (dislocated shoulder)	4	
1987-12-29	Win	(Thailand) Sanphet Loukrangsee	Lumpinee Stadium	Bangkok, Thailand	Decision	5	3:00
1987-11-23	Loss	(Thailand) Wanpichit Kaennorasing		Buriram, Thailand	KO	3	
1987-09-22	Win	(Thailand) Phayanoi Sor.Thasanee	Lumpinee Stadium	Bangkok, Thailand	Decision	5	3:00
1987-07-31	Win	(Thailand) Daotongnoi Sityodtong	Lumpinee Stadium	Bangkok, Thailand	Decision	5	3:00
1987-06-17	Draw	(Thailand) Jaroenthong Kiatbanchong	Lumpinee Stadium	Bangkok, Thailand	Decision	5	3:00
1987-03-26	Loss	(Thailand) Jaroenthong Kiatbanchong	Lumpinee Stadium	Bangkok, Thailand	Decision	5	3:00
1987-02-06	Win	(Thailand) Petchan Sakwicha	Lumpinee Stadium	Bangkok, Thailand	Decision	5	3:00
Wins the vacant Lumpinee Stadium Light Flyweight (108 lbs) title.
1986-12-19	Loss	(Thailand) Wangchannoi Sor Palangchai	Huamark Stadium Roman vs Payakaroon	Bangkok, Thailand	Decision	5	3:00
Loses the Lumpinee Stadium Light Flyweight (108 lbs) title.
1986-11-25	Win	(Thailand) Petchan Sakwicha	Lumpinee Stadium	Bangkok, Thailand	Decision	5	3:00
Wins the Lumpinee Stadium Light Flyweight (108 lbs) title.
1986-08-22	Loss	(Thailand) Wangchannoi Sor Palangchai	Lumpinee Stadium	Bangkok, Thailand	Decision	5	3:00
1986-03-28	Loss	(Thailand) Dejsak Payaksakda	Lumpinee Stadium	Bangkok, Thailand	Decision	5	3:00
1986-03-04	Loss	(Thailand) Petchchan Sakwicha	Lumpinee Stadium	Bangkok, Thailand	Decision	5	3:00
1985-12-31	Win	(Thailand) Langsuan Panyuthaphum	Lumpinee Stadium	Bangkok, Thailand	Decision	5	3:00
1985-11-29	Loss	(Thailand) Yodmanut Sityodtong	Lumpinee Stadium	Bangkok, Thailand	Decision	5	3:00
1985-10-11	Win	(Thailand) Saeksan Sitjomthong	Lumpinee Stadium	Bangkok, Thailand	Decision	5	3:00
Wins 100,000 baht side-bet.
1985-08-27	Win	(Thailand) Pinphet Sor.Samipak	Lumpinee Stadium	Bangkok, Thailand	Decision	5	3:00
1985-06-17	Win	(Thailand) Orono Sakwicha	Lumpinee Stadium	Bangkok, Thailand	Decision	5	3:00
1985-05-02	Win	(Thailand) Petchan Sor.Tassanee	Lumpinee Stadium	Bangkok, Thailand	Decision	5	3:00
1985-04-21	Win	(Thailand) Sanfet Chernyim	Lumpinee Stadium	Bangkok, Thailand	Decision	5	3:00
1985-02-01	Win	(Thailand) Petchan Sor.Tassanee	Lumpinee Stadium	Bangkok, Thailand	Decision	5	3:00
Legend: Win Loss Draw/No contest Notes
