= Paruehus Loh-ngern =

Thai former professional Muay Thai fighter

Paruehat Loh-ngern
- Born: Chalor Kuntharee; October 18, 1956 (age 70); Thanyaburi, Pathum Thani, Thailand
- Native name: พฤหัส โล่ห์เงิน
- Nickname: The Raging Bull of Rangsit Fields (กระทิงทุ่งรังสิต)
- Division: Bantamweight
- Style: Muay Thai (Muay Bouk)
- Stance: Southpaw
- Team: Loh-ngoen
- Years active: c. 1969–1982

Other information
- University: Ramkhamhaeng University
- Notable relatives: Paruhatlek Sitchunthong (younger brother); Paruhatnoi Sitchunthong (younger brother)

Chalor Kuntharee (Thai: ชะลอ กุลธารี), (Note: pronounced [tɕʰa.lɔ̄ː kūn.tʰāː.rīː], RTGS: Chalo Kunthari) known professionally as Paruehus Loh-ngern (Thai: พฤหัส โล่ห์เงิน, (Note: pronounced [pʰrɯ́.hàt lôː.ŋɤ̄n], RTGS: Phruehat Lo-ngoen) also spelled Paruhat), is a Thai former professional Muay Thai fighter. He is a former Lumpinee Stadium Bantamweight Champion who famous in the 1970s and 1980s.

== Biography and career ==
=== Early life ===
Paruehus was born in 1956 in Thanyaburi district, Pathum Thani province, a northern suburb of Bangkok. Kimchun Kuntharee, his father runs a Muay Thai gym called Sitchunthong. All of his male siblings are fighters, one of them has also become famous under the name Paruhatlek Sitchunthong.

=== Career ===
He got into fighting for the first time when he was about 13 years old. During the peak of his career, he battled with many contemporary top Muay Thai kickboxers, such as Mafuang Weerapol, Klairung Lookchaomaesaitong, Thanusuk Prasopchai, Sagat Phonthawee, Saengsakda Kittikasem, Aurachunnoi Hor.Mahachai, and Samart Payakaroon.

In 1979 he won the Lumpinee Stadium 118 lbs title. On July 7, 1980, he participated in an exceptional two against one handicap fight, teaming up with Thanusuk Prasopchai to defeat reigning Lumpinee Stadium champion Mafuang Weerapol.

He was one of the two opponents legend Samart Payakaroon said he feared the most (the other being Mafuang Weerapol).

=== Retirement ===
After retirement, he moved to New York City, USA in 1983 and had two children. He reappeared back in the muay thai scene when he trained his son (Chanon Kuntharee) who is also a fighter.

== Titles and accomplishments ==
- Lumpinee Stadium
  - 1979 Lumpinee Stadium Bantamweight (118 lbs) Champion
    - One successful title defense

== Muay Thai record ==
Muay Thai Record
Date	Result	Opponent	Event	Location	Method	Round	Time
1982-11-05	Loss	(Thailand) Thanusuk Prasopchai		Nakhon Ratchasima, Thailand	Decision	5	3:00
1982-09-	NC	(Thailand) Saifah Phromchat	Lumpinee Stadium	Bangkok, Thailand	Paruhat dismissed	5	
1982-07-09	Win	(Thailand) Saifah Phromchat	Lumpinee Stadium	Bangkok, Thailand	Decision	5	3:00
Wins 1.4 million baht side-bet.
1982-04-29	Win	(Thailand) Ananlek Lukminburi	Rajadamnern Stadium	Bangkok, Thailand	Decision	5	3:00
1982-04-08	Loss	(Thailand) FaUthai Phitsanurachan	Rajadamnern Stadium	Bangkok, Thailand	Decision	5	3:00
1981-11-23	Loss	(Thailand) Jomwo Chernyim	Rajadamnern Stadium	Bangkok, Thailand	Decision (Unanimous)	5	3:00
For the Rajadamnern Stadium Bantamweight (118 lbs) title.
1981-10-13	Win	(Thailand) Ronnachai Sunkilanongkhi	Lumpinee Stadium	Bangkok, Thailand	KO	2	
1981-09-04	Loss	(Thailand) Samart Payakaroon	Lumpinee Stadium	Bangkok, Thailand	Decision	5	3:00
1981-07-14	Win	(Thailand) Lamkhong Sitwaiwat	Lumpinee Stadium	Bangkok, Thailand	Decision	5	3:00
1981-06-09	Loss	(Thailand) Wanpadet Sitkrumai	Lumpinee Stadium	Bangkok, Thailand	Decision	5	3:00
1981-04-28	Win	(Thailand) Kitti Sor Thanikul	Lumpinee Stadium	Bangkok, Thailand	Decision	5	3:00
1981-01-23	Win	(Thailand) Jakkrawan Kiattisaktewan	Lumpinee Stadium	Bangkok, Thailand	KO	3	
1980-10-17	Loss	(Thailand) Saengsakda Kittikasem	Lumpinee Stadium	Bangkok, Thailand	KO	4	
1980-09-05	Win	(Thailand) Pol Sitpordaeng	Lumpinee Stadium	Bangkok, Thailand	Decision	5	3:00
1980-07-29	Win	(Thailand) Mafuang Weerapol	2 vs 1 Lumpinee Stadium	Bangkok, Thailand	Decision	5	3:00
Handicap match for Mafuang. Paruhat fought the first three rounds and Thanusuk Prasopchai the next two.
1980-01-22	Loss	(Thailand) Mafuang Weerapol	Lumpinee Stadium	Bangkok, Thailand	Decision	5	3:00
Loses the Lumpinee Stadium Bantamweight (118 lbs) title.
1979-11-29	Loss	(Thailand) Wanlop Pichitsamut	Rajadamnern Stadium	Bangkok, Thailand	Decision	5	3:00
1979-09-11	Win	(Thailand) Chokchainoi Sor Chokprasert	Lumpinee Stadium	Bangkok, Thailand	KO (Punches)	2	
Defends the Lumpinee Stadium Bantamweight (118 lbs) title.
1979-06-26	Win	(Thailand) Thanusuk Prasopchai	Lumpinee Stadium	Bangkok, Thailand	KO (Punches)	3	
1979-03-23	Win	(Thailand) Thanusuk Prasopchai	Rangsit Stadium	Pathum Thani, Thailand	Decision	5	3:00
Wins the vacant Lumpinee Stadium Bantamweight (118 lbs) title.
1979-01-05	Win	(Thailand) Sakda Boonroj	Lumpinee Stadium	Bangkok, Thailand	Decision	5	3:00
1978-10-30	Draw	(Thailand) Khaosod Sitpraprom	Shin Kakutou Jutsu	Tokyo, Japan	Decision	5	3:00
1978-08-28	Win	(Thailand) Dennapha Lukbangkho	Rajadamnern Stadium	Bangkok, Thailand	KO	3	
1978-06-07	Loss	(Thailand) Manachai Sitampon	Rajadamnern Stadium	Bangkok, Thailand	Decision	5	3:00
1978-04-27	Loss	(Thailand) Supernoi Kiatchainarong	Rajadamnern Stadium	Bangkok, Thailand	Decision	5	3:00
1978-04-03	Win	(Thailand) Weerachai Duangprateep	Rajadamnern Stadium	Bangkok, Thailand	Decision	5	3:00
1978-01-18	Loss	(Thailand) Rojdej Rojsongkram	Rajadamnern Stadium	Bangkok, Thailand	Decision	5	3:00
1977-12-09	Loss	(Thailand) Dieselnoi Chor Thanasukarn	Rajadamnern Stadium	Bangkok, Thailand	Decision	5	3:00
1977-08-04	Loss	(Thailand) Tawanook Sitpoonchai	Rajadamnern Stadium	Bangkok, Thailand	Decision	5	3:00
1977-07-06	Win	(Thailand) Prawit Sritham	Rajadamnern Stadium	Bangkok, Thailand	Decision	5	3:00
1977-04-28	Win	(Thailand) Singnoom Ekachai	Rajadamnern Stadium	Bangkok, Thailand	Decision	5	3:00
1977-03-31	Loss	(Thailand) Seksan Sor.Theppitak		Bangkok, Thailand	Decision	5	3:00
1976-12-07	Loss	(Thailand) Kengkaj Kiatkriangkrai	Lumpinee Stadium	Bangkok, Thailand	Decision	5	3:00
1976-08-26	Win	(Thailand) Klairung Lookchaomaesaitong	Rajadamnern Stadium	Bangkok, Thailand	Decision	5	3:00
1976-07-29	Win	(Thailand) Saengsakda Kittikasem	Rajadamnern Stadium	Bangkok, Thailand	Decision	5	3:00
1976-05-27	Win	(Thailand) Noomthanong Suanmiskawan	Mumnamgoen, Rajadamnern Stadium	Bangkok, Thailand	KO	3	
1976-05-06	Win	(Thailand) Kengkaj Kiatkriangkrai	Mumnamgoen, Rajadamnern Stadium	Bangkok, Thailand	Decision	5	3:00
1976-03-02	Loss	(Thailand) Sagat Porntawee	Lumpinee Stadium	Bangkok, Thailand	Decision	5	3:00
1975-11-24		(Thailand) Thongsak Sitphordaeng	Rajadamnern Stadium	Bangkok, Thailand			
1975-09-17	Loss	(Thailand) Saknarongnoi Lukbangpakong	Rajadamnern Stadium	Bangkok, Thailand	Decision	5	3:00
1975-08-29	Win	(Thailand) Rojdej Rojsongkram	Lumpinee Stadium	Bangkok, Thailand	Decision	5	3:00
1975-07-31	Win	(Thailand) Phetnamnueng Mongkolpitak	Petchsiam, Rajadamnern Stadium	Bangkok, Thailand	Decision	5	3:00
1975-07-09	Draw	(Thailand) Kanchai Porntawee	Petchsiam, Rajadamnern Stadium	Bangkok, Thailand	Decision	5	3:00
1975-	Loss	(Thailand) Saksakon Sakchannarong	Rajadamnern Stadium	Bangkok, Thailand	Decision	5	3:00
For the Rajadamnern Stadium Bantamweight (118 lbs) title.
1975-04-28	Loss	(Thailand) Chaiyaphum Sakwittaya	Petchsiam, Rajadamnern Stadium	Bangkok, Thailand	Decision	5	3:00
1975-02-06	Win	(Thailand) Samphan Payakmakham	Muang Klaeng Boxing Stadium	Rayong province, Thailand	Decision	5	3:00
1974-11-22		(Thailand) Chansak Singwattana	Lumpinee Stadium	Bangkok, Thailand			
1974-10-01	Win	(Thailand) Orachunnoi Hor.Mahachai	Lumpinee Stadium	Bangkok, Thailand	Decision	5	3:00
1974-08-22	Loss	(Thailand) Ruengsak Porntawee	Rajadamnern Stadium	Bangkok, Thailand	Decision	5	3:00
1974-07-14	Win	(Thailand) Klairung Lukchaomaesaithong	Chonghanglek, Lumpinee Stadium	Bangkok, Thailand	Decision	5	3:00
1974-05-28	Draw	(Thailand) Klairung Lukchaomaesaithong	Japan vs Thailand, Huamark Stadium	Bangkok, Thailand	Decision	5	3:00
1974-03-15	Loss	(Thailand) Denthoraneenoi Luedthaksin	Lumpinee Stadium	Bangkok, Thailand	Decision	5	3:00
1973-10-27	Loss	(Thailand) Nares Kwinchumpae	Chartchai Chionoi vs SUsumu Hangata, Huamark Stadium	Bangkok, Thailand	Decision	5	3:00
1973-09-28	Win	(Thailand) Luknongchok Toichon		Bangkok, Thailand	Decision	5	3:00
1973-09-12	Win	(Thailand) Daothong Sityodthong	Chao Tawan Ok, Rajadamnern Stadium	Bangkok, Thailand	KO	4	
1973-04-03	Win	(Thailand) Noklek Sor.Bangchan	Kiatsiam, Lumpinee Stadium	Bangkok, Thailand	Decision	5	3:00
1973-02-14	Win	(Thailand) Noklek Sor.Bangchan	Chao Tawan Ok, Rajadamnern Stadium	Bangkok, Thailand	Decision	5	3:00
Legend: Win Loss Draw/No contest Notes
