= Yodwanpadet Suwanwichit =

Thai boxer

Personal information
- Born: 19 November 1961 (age 64) Pak Phanang district, Nakhon Si Thammarat
- Height: 180 cm (5 ft 11 in)
- Weight: 63 kg (139 lb; 9.9 st)

Sport
- Sport: Muay Thai, Boxing
Medal record
Representing Thailand
Men's Boxing
Southeast Asian Games
Gold medal – first place	1987 Jakarta	Light Welterweight
Silver medal – second place	1989 Kuala Lumpur	Light Welterweight

Yodwanpadet Suwanwichit (Thai: ยอดวันเผด็จ สุวรรณวิจิตร), born Pravit Suwanwichit (ประวิทย์ สุวรรณวิจิตร, 19 November 1961), is a Thai Muay Thai fighter and promoter, amateur boxer and Royal Thai Air Force group captain. He is a former Rajadamnern and Lumpinee champion, known by the ring names Wanpadet Sitkhrumai (วันเผด็จ ศิษย์ครูหมาย) and Wanpadet Phukrongfah (วันเผด็จ ผู้ครองฟ้า), among others. He won medals in boxing at the 1987 and 1989 SEA Games, and competed in the men's light welterweight event at the 1988 Summer Olympics.

In 2012 (aged 51), he fought a publicity match against Somluck Kamsing at Rajadamnern Stadium, where tickets sold out for the first time in over 15 years.

== Titles and accomplishments ==
=== Muay Thai ===
- Rajadamnern Stadium
  - 1983 Rajadamnern Stadium Super Featherweight (130 lbs) Champion
  - 1987 Rajadamnern Stadium Lightweight (135 lbs) Champion
    - One successful title defense
- Lumpinee Stadium
  - 1985 Lumpinee Stadium Super Featherweight (130 lbs) Champion
  - 1986 Lumpinee Stadium Super Featherweight (130 lbs) Champion
- World Muay Thai Association
  - 1988 WMTA World Champion

== Muay Thai record ==
Muay Thai Record
Date	Result	Opponent	Event	Location	Method	Round	Time
2015-02-03	Win	(Thailand) Tanatoy EminentAir	Lumpinee Stadium	Bangkok, Thailand	TKO (retirement)	3	
Wins 4 million baht side-bet. Handicap fight, Wanpadet could only use his fists.
2013-02-06	Loss	(Thailand) Somluck Kamsing	Rajadamnern Stadium	Bangkok, Thailand	Decision	5	3:00
2012-10-04	Loss	(Thailand) Somluck Kamsing	Rajadamnern Stadium	Bangkok, Thailand	TKO	3	
For a 5.7 million baht side-bet.
1988-	Win	(France) Guillaume Kerner		Paris, France	Decision	5	3:00
Wins W.M.T.A World title.
1988-06-30	Win	(Thailand) Sangtiennoi Sor.Rungroj	Rajadamnern Stadium	Bangkok, Thailand	Decision	5	3:00
1988-03-28	Win	(Thailand) Nokweed Devy	Rajadamnern Stadium	Bangkok, Thailand	Decision	5	3:00
Defends the Rajadamnern Stadium 135 lbs Title.
1987-	Win	(Thailand) Phraedam Lukprabat	Rajadamnern Stadium	Bangkok, Thailand	Decision	5	3:00
1987-	Win	(Thailand) Phraedam Lukprabat	Rajadamnern Stadium	Bangkok, Thailand	Decision	5	3:00
1987-06-22	Loss	(Thailand) Nokweed Devy	Rajadamnern Stadium	Bangkok, Thailand	Decision	5	3:00
1987-	Win	(Thailand) Komtae Chor.Suananant	Rajadamnern Stadium	Bangkok, Thailand	Decision	5	3:00
Wins the Rajadamnern Stadium 135 lbs Title.
1987-01-12	Win	(Thailand) Komtae Chor.Suananant	Rajadamnern Stadium	Bangkok, Thailand	Decision	5	3:00
1986-12-22	Loss	(Thailand) Nokweed Devy	Rajadamnern Stadium	Bangkok, Thailand	Decision	5	3:00
1986-11-29	Win	(Thailand) Kulabkhao Na Nontachai	Japan-Thailand relation Charity event "Muay Thai Champions Clash"	Tokyo, Japan	Decision	5	3:00
Wins Thailand 130 lbs Title. Lumpinee Stadium champion vs Rajadamnern Stadium champion.
1986-	Win	(Thailand) Sagat Petchyindee	Rajadamnern Stadium	Bangkok, Thailand	Decision	5	3:00
1986-07-23	Win	(Thailand) Nokweed Devy	Rajadamnern Stadium	Bangkok, Thailand	Decision (Unanimous)	5	3:00
Wins the Rajadamnern Stadium 130 lbs Title.
1986-06-02	Win	(Netherlands) Ivan Sprang		Paris, France	KO	3	
1986-05-28	Win	(Thailand) Phraedam Lukprabat	Rajadamnern Stadium	Bangkok, Thailand	Decision	5	3:00
1985-12-19	Win	(Thailand) Daoden Sakornphitak		Bangkok, Thailand	Decision	5	3:00
1985-08-21	Win	(Thailand) Kitti Sor.Thanikul		Bangkok, Thailand	Decision	5	3:00
1985-04-18	Win	(Thailand) Jomtrai Petchyindee	Rajadamnern Stadium	Bangkok, Thailand	Decision	5	3:00
1985-01-27	Loss	(Suriname) Lucien Carbin	Thaiboxing	Amsterdam, Netherlands	Decision	5	3:00
Gets stripped of his Lumpinee Stadium title back in Thailand.
1985-01-22	Win	(Thailand) Daoden Sakornphitak	Lumpinee Stadium	Bangkok, Thailand	Decision	5	3:00
Wins the Lumpinee Stadium 130 lbs Title.
1984-12-01	Loss	(Thailand) Nokweed Devy	Wanwuttichai	Hat Yai, Thailand	Decision	5	3:00
1984-11-15	Loss	(Thailand) Kengkla Sitsei	Rajadamnern Stadium	Bangkok, Thailand	Decision	5	3:00
For the Rajadamnern Stadium Super Featherweight (130 lbs) title.
1984-10-18	Win	(Thailand) Jomtrai Petchyindee	Rajadamnern Stadium	Bangkok, Thailand	Decision	5	3:00
1984-09-03	Loss	(Thailand) Kengkla Sitsei	Rajadamnern Stadium	Bangkok, Thailand	Decision	5	3:00
Loses the Rajadamnern Stadium Super Featherweight (130 lbs) title.
1984-05-05	Win	(Thailand) Lom-Isan Sor.Thanikul		Nakhon Si Thammarat, Thailand	Decision	5	3:00
1984-02-20	Win	(Thailand) Lom-Isan Sor.Thanikul	Rajadamnern Stadium	Bangkok, Thailand	Decision	5	3:00
1983-12-29	Win	(Thailand) Ratchabut Sor.Thanikul	Rajadamnern Stadium	Bangkok, Thailand	Decision	5	3:00
Wins the vacant Rajadamnern Stadium Super Featherweight (130 lbs) title.
1983-11-10	Win	(Thailand) Tawanook Penmongkol	Rajadamnern Stadium	Bangkok, Thailand	Decision	5	3:00
1983-09-28	Loss	(Thailand) Lom-Isan Sor.Thanikul	Rajadamnern Stadium	Bangkok, Thailand	Decision	5	3:00
For the vacant Rajadamnern Stadium 126 lbs title.
1983-08-24	Win	(Thailand) Jock Kiatniwat	Rajadamnern Stadium	Bangkok, Thailand	Decision	5	3:00
1983-06-21	Draw	(Thailand) Dawden Sakornphitak	Lumpinee Stadium	Bangkok, Thailand	Decision	5	3:00
1983-05-19	Win	(Thailand) Tong Lukbansuan	Rajadamnern Stadium	Bangkok, Thailand	Decision	5	3:00
1983-04-04	Loss	(Thailand) Lom-Isan Sor.Thanikul	Rajadamnern Stadium	Bangkok, Thailand	Decision	5	3:00
1983-03-10	Win	(Thailand) Jomwo Chernyim	Rajadamnern Stadium	Bangkok, Thailand	Decision	5	3:00
1982-12-13	Win	(Thailand) Ratchabut Sor.Thanikul		Bangkok, Thailand	Decision	5	3:00
1982-10-21	Win	(Thailand) Prabsing Kiatbundit		Bangkok, Thailand	Decision	5	3:00
1982-08-11	Win	(Thailand) Sananchai Sor.Kiattisak		Bangkok, Thailand	Decision	5	3:00
1982-06-12	Win	(Thailand) Kulabkhao Na Nontachai		Bangkok, Thailand	Decision	5	3:00
1982-04-02	Loss	(Thailand) Saengsakda Kittikasem	Lumpinee Stadium	Bangkok, Thailand	KO (Punch)	2	
1982-02-18	Win	(Thailand) Kanongsuek Muangchaiyaphum	Rajadamnern Stadium	Bangkok, Thailand	Decision	5	3:00
1981-11-30	Loss	(Thailand) Ronnachai Sunkilanongki	Rajadamnern Stadium	Bangkok, Thailand	Decision	5	3:00
1981-09-24	Loss	(Thailand) Singpathom Pongsurakan	Rajadamnern Stadium	Bangkok, Thailand	Decision	5	3:00
1981-08-27	Loss	(Thailand) Kitti Sor.Thanikul	Rajadamnern Stadium	Bangkok, Thailand	Decision	5	3:00
1981-07-15	Win	(Thailand) Chokchainoi Muangchaiyaphum		Thailand	Decision	5	3:00
1981-06-09	Win	(Thailand) Paruhat Loh-ngoen	Lumpinee Stadium	Bangkok, Thailand	Decision	5	3:00
1981-05-07	Draw	(Thailand) Jock Kiatniwat	Rajadamnern Stadium	Bangkok, Thailand	Decision	5	3:00
1981-03-30	NC	(Thailand) Maewpa Sitchang		Bangkok, Thailand	Ref. stop. (Maewpa dismissed)	5	
1981-03-04	Win	(Thailand) Fa-Uthai Pitsanurachan	Rajadamnern Stadium	Bangkok, Thailand	Decision	5	3:00
1981-01-23	Win	(Thailand) Lamkhong Sitwaiwat	Lumpinee Stadium	Bangkok, Thailand	Decision	5	3:00
1980-12-	NC	(Thailand) Kiattinon Lukbanpra		Hat Yai, Thailand	Kiattinon dismissed	5	
1981-11-15	Loss	(Thailand) Jakrawan Kiattisaktewan		Bangkok, Thailand	Decision	5	3:00
1980-09-15	Draw	(Thailand) Anantlek Lukminburi		Thailand	Decision	5	3:00
1980-08-	Win	(Thailand) Petchsakon Kiatmuangtrang		Hat Yai, Thailand	Decision	5	3:00
1980-06-29	Win	(Thailand) Khunpolnoi Sitprasang		Hat Yai, Thailand	TKO	4	
1980-06-17	Win	(Thailand) Diesellek Lukbangpakok	Rajadamnern Stadium	Bangkok, Thailand	KO	4	
1980-03-15	Win	(Thailand) Jakrawan Kiattisaktewan	Hat Yai Boxing Stadium	Songkhla, Thailand	KO	3	
1980-01-12	Win	(Thailand) Apidejnoi Sithiran		Hat Yai, Thailand	Decision	5	3:00
Legend: Win Loss Draw/No contest Notes
