= Phat Kongrum =

Thai former Muay Thai fighter and amateur boxer (born 1959)

Samingnoom Sithiboontham
- Born: Phat Kongrum; 7 September 1959 (age 67); Mueang Buriram, Buriram, Thailand
- Native name: พัด คงรัมย์
- Other names: Samingnum
- Height: 167 cm (5 ft 6 in)
- Division: Flyweight; Super Flyweight; Featherweight; Super Featherweight
- Style: Muay Thai; Boxing
- Team: Sor.Prateep

Other information
- Boxing record from BoxRec

Phat Kongrum (Thai: พัด คงรัมย์, IPA: [pʰát kʰōŋrām]; born 7 September 1959), known professionally as Samingnoom Sithiboontham (สมิงหนุ่ม สิทธิบุญธรรม, pronounced [sāmīŋnùm sìttʰībūntʰām]), is a retired Thai Muay Thai fighter and amateur boxer. He is a former two-division Rajadamnern Stadium champion and competed in amateur boxing at Lightweight in the 1988 Summer Olympics.

== Biography and career ==
Before amateur boxing, Kongrum had been competing in Muay Thai under the name "Samingnoom Sithiboontham" (สมิงหนุ่ม สิทธิบุญธรรม) and was considered one of the top Muay Thai fighters. He has fought with many famous Muay Thai boxers in the 1980s, such as Samart Payakaroon, Kongtoranee Payakaroon or Nokweed Devy. He fought Samart Payakaroon twice, in the year 1981 and in 1983 and lost both times.

== Titles and accomplishments ==
- Rajadamnern Stadium
  - 1981 Rajadamnern Stadium Super Flyweight (115 lbs) Champion
  - 1983 Rajadamnern Stadium Super Featherweight (130 lbs) Champion

== Muay Thai record ==
Muay Thai Record
Date	Result	Opponent	Event	Location	Method	Round	Time
?	Win	Paul Lamout		Helsinki, Finland	Decision	5	3:00
1986-	Win	(United States) Nelson Placentia		Los Angeles, United States	Decision	5	3:00
1986-09-06	Win	(Thailand) Kulabkhao Na Nontachai	Sappasithiprasong Stadium	Ubon Ratchathani province, Thailand	Decision	5	3:00
1986-	Loss	(Thailand) Jomtrai Petchyindee	Rajadamnern Stadium	Bangkok, Thailand	KO	3	
For the Rajadamnern Stadium Lightweight (135 lbs) title.
1985-12-06	Loss	(Thailand) Lom-Isan Sor.Thanikul		Ubon Ratchathani, Thailand	Decision	5	3:00
1985-03-02	Win	(Thailand) Lom-Isan Sor.Thanikul		Buriram province, Thailand	Decision	5	3:00
1984-08-23	Loss	(Thailand) Nokweed Devy	Rajadamnern Stadium	Bangkok, Thailand	Decision	5	3:00
1984-06-14	Loss	(Thailand) Lom-Isan Sor.Thanikul	Rajadamnern Stadium	Bangkok, Thailand	Decision	5	3:00
1983-05-12	Loss	(Thailand) Khaosod Sitpraprom	Rajadamnern Stadium	Bangkok, Thailand			
Loses the Rajadamnern Stadium Super Featherweight (130 lbs) title.
1983-03-17	Win	(Thailand) Khaosod Sitpraprom	Rajadamnern Stadium	Bangkok, Thailand	KO (Elbow)	3	
Wins the Rajadamnern Stadium Super Featherweight (130 lbs) title.
1983-02-04	Loss	(Thailand) Samart Payakaroon	Lumpinee Stadium	Bangkok, Thailand	Decision	5	3:00
1982-12-24	Win	(Thailand) Ruengsak Petchyindee	Rajadamnern Stadium	Bangkok, Thailand	Decision	5	3:00
1982-11-27	Win	(Thailand) Singpathom Pongsurakan	Suranaree Boxing Stadium	Nakhon Ratchasima, Thailand	Decision	5	3:00
1982-10-25	Win	(Thailand) Kengkaj Kiatkriangkrai	Rajadamnern Stadium	Bangkok, Thailand	Decision	5	3:00
1982-08-25	Loss	(Thailand) Khaosod Sitpraprom	Rajadamnern Stadium	Bangkok, Thailand	Decision	5	3:00
1982-	Win	(Thailand) Kengkla Sitsei	Rajadamnern Stadium	Bangkok, Thailand	Decision	5	3:00
1982-05-28	Win	(Thailand) Pon Sit Pordaeng	Lumpinee Stadium	Bangkok, Thailand	Decision	5	3:00
1982-04-19	Win	(Thailand) Jomwo Sakniran	Rajadamnern Stadium	Bangkok, Thailand	Decision	5	3:00
1982-03-29	Win	(Thailand) Jomwo Sakniran	Rajadamnern Stadium	Bangkok, Thailand	Decision	5	3:00
1982-	Win	(Thailand) Jock Kiatniwat	Rajadamnern Stadium	Bangkok, Thailand	Decision	5	3:00
1982-01-15	Loss	(Thailand) Mafuang Weerapol	Lumpinee Stadium	Bangkok, Thailand	KO	3	
1981-11-26	Win	(Thailand) Samransak Muangsurin	Rajadamnern Stadium	Bangkok, Thailand	Decision	5	3:00
1981-10-13	Loss	(Thailand) Samart Payakaroon	Lumpinee Stadium	Bangkok, Thailand	Decision	5	3:00
For the vacant Lumpinee Stadium Featherweight (126 lbs) Champion.
1981-09-24	Win	(Thailand) Ronnachai SunKilaNongkhee	Rajadamnern Stadium	Bangkok, Thailand	Decision	5	3:00
1981-08-20	Win	(Thailand) Jomwo Sakniran	Rajadamnern Stadium	Bangkok, Thailand	Decision	5	3:00
1981-07-23	Win	(Thailand) Pon Sit Pordaeng	Rajadamnern Stadium	Bangkok, Thailand	Decision	5	3:00
1981-06-18	Win	(Thailand) Jock Kiatniwat	Rajadamnern Stadium	Bangkok, Thailand	Decision	5	3:00
1981-05-13	Loss	(Thailand) Kongtoranee Payakaroon	Rajadamnern Stadium	Bangkok, Thailand	Decision	5	3:00
1981-	Win	(Thailand) Pon Sitpordaeng		Bangkok, Thailand	Decision	5	3:00
1981-	Win	(Thailand) Tong Petchyindee	Rajadamnern Stadium	Bangkok, Thailand	Decision (Unanimous)	5	3:00
Wins the Rajadamnern Stadium Super Flyweight (115 lbs) title.
1980-11-06	Win	(Thailand) Samingnoom Ludrayong	Rajadamnern Stadium	Bangkok, Thailand	Decision	5	3:00
1980-05-17	Win	(Thailand) Rungroj Lookcholae		Ubon Ratchathani, Thailand	Decision	5	3:00
1979-09-21	NC	(Thailand) Kiatnon Lukbanphra	Lumpinee Stadium	Bangkok, Thailand	Samingnum dismissed	5	
1979-08-21	Win	(Thailand) Phadam Lukbangbo	Lumpinee Stadium	Bangkok, Thailand	Decision	5	3:00
1979-02-06	Win	(Thailand) Saenphol Saengrit		Khon Kaen province, Thailand	Decision	5	3:00
1978-06-02	Win	(Thailand) Sammuen Porntawee	Wilfredo Gomez vs Sagat Porntawee	Nakhon Ratchasima, Thailand	Decision	5	3:00
Wins 100,000 baht side-bet.
1977-12-06	Win	(Thailand) Attapee Boonrot	Lumpinee Stadium	Bangkok, Thailand	Decision	5	3:00
1977-08-30	Loss	(Thailand) Panlert Wongmanee	Lumpinee Stadium	Bangkok, Thailand	Decision	5	3:00
1976-12-03	Win	(Thailand) Jakrawat Kiattisakthewan	Lumpinee Stadium	Bangkok, Thailand	Decision	5	3:00
Legend: Win Loss Draw/No contest Notes
