= Kenichi Ogata =

Kenichi Ogata may refer to:

- Kenichi Ogata (shoot boxer) (born 1975), Japanese kickboxer
- Kenichi Ogata (voice actor) (born 1942), Japanese voice actor
