= Dany Bill =

French-Cameroonian former professional Muay Thai fighter and kickboxer

- Born: Dany Billé; 28 April 1973 (age 53); Douala, Cameroon
- Nickname: Black Monk (ไอ้ดำพระกาฬ); Dangerous Black Lion (สิงดำ อันตราย)
- Height: 175 cm (5 ft 9 in)
- Division: Super Lightweight; Welterweight; Super Welterweight
- Style: Muay Thai (Muay Femur)
- Stance: Southpaw
- Team: Nemrod Boxing Gym; Club RMBoxing; Sidyodtong Gym; Jocky Gym
- Years active: c. 1986–2012

Kickboxing record
- Total: 127
- Wins: 115
- By knockout: 40
- Losses: 12

Dany Bill (born 28 April 1973) is a Cameroonian former professional Muay Thai fighter and kickboxer. He is a former seven-time Muay Thai World Champion.

== Biography ==
The early life of Danny Bill was spent in France, where he developed a passion for soccer. In 1986 he started training at the elite Nemrod Boxing Gym, which is housed inside La Cité du Clos Saint Lazare in his hometown of Stains (93). At the age of 15, he won the of French Muay Thai national junior title.

In 1993 Bill defeated Den Muangsurin in Bangkok during the King's Birthday celebration to become the first fighter from France to win a Muay Thai World title in Thailand.

From 1993 until 1999, he held the title of World Champion. He held wins over fighters such as Nokweed Devy, Panomrunglek Chor.Sawat, Saimaisuk, Orono Por.MuangUbon, Ramon Dekkers and Joe Prestia.

Sakmongkol Sithchuchok defeated him in 1997 to win the World Title. Following that, he competed in a fight at Thailand's King's Birthday in 2000, but Kaolan Kaovichit defeated him. Before making his return to Muay Thai in 2003 against Aurelien Duarte, he had two years of retirement from the sport. He lost the match after suffering a leg injury in the second round.

In 2006, Bill made his second comeback in the European kickboxing fighting circuit, Superleague. On his first fight back he won against Moises Baptista de Souza and then beat Roberto Cocco from Italy by unanimous decision.

Dany Bill is currently a Muay Thai Trainer.

== Titles ==
- 1993 - 1999 : 7 time World Muay Thai Champion
- 1990 French Senior Muay Thai Champion
- 1989 French Junior Muay Thai Champion
- 1988 French Cadet Muay Thai Champion

== Fight record ==
Professional kickboxing record
115 wins, 12 losses
| Date | Result | Opponent | Event | Location | Method | Round | Time |
| 2011-05-21 | Loss | (Morocco) Hicham El Gaoui | Le Choc Des Legéndes | Saint Ouen, France | Decision (unanimous) | 3 | 3:00 |
| 2006-03-11 | Win | (Italy) Roberto Cocco | SuperLeague Apocalypse 2006 | Paris, France | Decision (unanimous) | 3 | 3:00 |
| 2006-01-28 | Win | (Brazil) Moises Baptisa De Souza | SuperLeague Hungary 2006 | Budapest, Hungary | Decision (unanimous) | 3 | 3:00 |
| 2003-10-25 | Loss | (France) Aurelien Duarte | Apocalypse 2003 | France | TKO (tibia fracture) | 2 | |
| 2000-12-05 | Loss | (Thailand) Kaolan Kaovichit | King's Birthday Event | Bangkok, Thailand | Decision (unanimous) | 5 | 3:00 |
| 2000-05-20 | Win | (Thailand) Kraingkai Sor.Worapin | France Thaïlande | France | TKO (low kicks) | 2 | |
| 1998-12-05 | Win | (Thailand) Sangtiennoi Sor.Rungroj | King's Birthday Event | Bangkok, Thailand | Decision (unanimous) | 5 | 3:00 |
| 1998- | Win | (Thailand) Orono Por.MuangUbon | | Paris, France | Decision (unanimous) | 5 | 3:00 |
Wins the vacant WMTC World Super Welterweight (154 lbs) title.
| 1998-05-23 | Win | (Morocco) Kamal L'marzguiou | Muay Thai Champions League Part II | Roosendaal, Netherlands | KO | 4 | |
| 1998-02-07 | Win | (Thailand) Dendanai Ekawit | Lumpinee Stadium | Bangkok, Thailand | Decision | 5 | 3:00 |
| 1997-12-05 | Win | (Thailand) Orono Por.MuangUbon | King's Birthday | Bangkok, Thailand | Decision (unanimous) | 5 | 3:00 |
| 1997-11-22 | Win | (Netherlands) Ramon Dekkers | King of the Ring | Paris, France | Decision (unanimous) | 5 | 3:00 |
| 1997-10-25 | Loss | (Thailand) Wicharn Chor.Rojanachai | MAJKF | Bunkyo, Tokyo, Japan | Decision (unanimous) | 5 | 3:00 |
| 1997-10-05 | Loss | (Thailand) Sakmongkol Sithchuchok | Khebchi Promotion, Coubertin Stadium | Paris, France | Decision (split) | 5 | 3:00 |
Loses the WMTC World Super Welterweight (154 lbs) title.
| 1997-09- | Win | (Netherlands) Peter Kley | | Prague, Czech Republic | Decision | 5 | 3:00 |
| 1997-05-09 | Win | (Japan) Kenichi Ogata | Shoot Boxing 1997, | Tokyo, Japan | TKO (corner stoppage) | 5 | 1:42 |
| 1997-02-01 | Win | (Thailand) Nongmoon Chomphutong | Le Choc Des Champions | Gagny, France | TKO (doctor stoppage) | 4 | |
Wins the WMTC World Super Welterweight (154 lbs) title.
| 1996-11-16 | Loss | (Thailand) Samart Kayadisorn | Onesongchai, Lumpinee Stadium | Bangkok, Thailand | Decision | 5 | 3:00 |
| 1996-07-14 | Loss | (Morocco) Hassan Kassrioui | Shoot Boxing - S-Cup 1996, Opening Round | Tokyo, Japan | Ext.R decision (unanimous) | 4 | 3:00 |
| 1996- | Win | (England) Eval Denton | | Paris, France | TKO (low kicks) | 4 | |
| 1996- | Loss | (Thailand) Kraingkai Sor.Worapin | Lumpinee Stadium | Bangkok, Thailand | Decision | 5 | 3:00 |
| 1996-03-30 | Loss | (Thailand) Sangtiennoi Sor.Rungroj | | Pattaya, Thailand | Decision | 5 | 3:00 |
| 1995-11-17 | Win | (France) Jo Prestia | La Nuit des Champions | Levallois-Perret, France | Decision (unanimous) | 5 | 3:00 |
Defending the WMTC World Welterweight (147 lbs) title. Bill was 4kg over the limit.
| 1995- | Win | (Thailand) Panomrunglek Chor.Sawat | Lumpinee Stadium | Bangkok, Thailand | Decision (unanimous) | 5 | 3:00 |
| 1995-08-27 | Win | (Thailand) Samaisuk Sakmuang | | Austria | Decision (unanimous) | 5 | 3:00 |
| 1995-05-07 | Win | (United States) Ronnie Lewis | Shoot Boxing "Battle Rave vol.3" | Tokyo, Japan | Ext.R decision | 4 | 3:00 |
| 1995-03-15 | Win | (Netherlands) Dylan Gravenberg | Palais Omnisport de Thiais | Thiais, France | Decision (unanimous) | 5 | 3:00 |
Defends the WMTC World Welterweight (147 lbs) title.
| ? | Win | (Thailand) Mangonjuk | | Paris, France | Decision (unanimous) | 5 | 3:00 |
Defends the WMTC World Welterweight (147 lbs) title.
| 1994-12-05 | Win | (Thailand) Sayidkhan Kiatpathan | King's Birthday Event | Mae Sai, Chiang Rai, Thailand | Decision (unanimous) | 5 | 3:00 |
Defends the WMTC World Welterweight (147 lbs) title.
| 1994- | Win | (Thailand) Wicharn Chor.Rojanachai | Cirque d'hiver | Paris, France | Decision (unanimous) | 5 | 3:00 |
| 1994-09-20 | Win | (Thailand) Nokweed Devy | | Bangkok, Thailand | Decision (unanimous) | 5 | 3:00 |
Defends the WMTC World Welterweight (147 lbs) title. Originally a decision win for Nokweed, overturned 5 minutes later after a gamblers' riot.
| 1994 ? | Win | (Thailand) Pananonlek | Lumpinee Stadium | Bangkok, Thailand | Decision (unanimous) | 5 | 3:00 |
| 1994-08-03 | Loss | (Thailand) Coban Lookchaomaesaitong | Lumpinee Stadium | Bangkok, Thailand | Decision | 5 | 3:00 |
| 1994-06-25 | Win | (France) Joel Cesar | | Levallois-Perret, France | Decision (unanimous) | 5 | 3:00 |
| 1994-04-29 | Win | (France) Joel Cesar | Cirque d'hiver | Paris, France | Decision (unanimous) | 5 | 3:00 |
| 1994 | Loss | (Netherlands) Nordin Ben Salah | | Amsterdam, Netherlands | Decision | 5 | 3:00 |
For a Muay Thai World 154 lbs title.
| 1993-12-05 | Win | (Thailand) Den Muangsurin | King's Birthday Event | Bangkok, Thailand | Decision | 5 | 3:00 |
Wins the vacant WMTC Welterweight (147 lbs) title.
| 1993 | Win | (Spain) Eduardo Ezquerra | | Spain | KO (high kick) | 1 | |
| 1992 | Loss | (Thailand) Nongmoon Chomphutong | | | Decision | 5 | 3:00 |
For the vacant WMC World Super Lightweight (140 lbs) title.
| 1992 | Win | (France) Frédéric Klose | | France | Decision | 5 | 3:00 |
| 1992-06-09 | Win | (Thailand) Samarth GalaxyGym | | Paris, France | Decision | 5 | 3:00 |
Legend: Win Loss Draw/no contest Notes

== See also ==
- List of male kickboxers
