= Morad Sari =

French-Algerian former Muay Thai fighter and kickboxer (born 1973)

- Born: June 20, 1973 (age 53); Gennevilliers, France
- Nationality: French
- Height: 178 cm (5 ft 10 in)
- Division: Super Lightweight; Welterweight; Super Welterweight
- Reach: 184 cm (72 in)
- Style: Muay Thai (Muay Bouk)
- Stance: Orthodox

Kickboxing record
- Total: 104
- Wins: 89
- By knockout: 59
- Losses: 14
- Draws: 1

Morad Sari (born June 20, 1973) is a French-Algerian former professional Muay Thai fighter and kickboxer. He is a former Lumpinee Stadium Super Lightweight Champion who was active during the 1990s and 2000s. Notably he's the first non-Thai to win a Lumpinee title and the third after Toshio Fujiwara to win a major Thai stadium title.

== Titles and accomplishments ==
=== Muay Thai ===
- 1998 ISKA Oriental Rules World Welterweight (147 lbs) Champion
- 1999 Lumpinee Stadium Super Lightweight (140 lbs) Champion
- 2000 ISKA Oriental Rules Intercontinental Super Welterweight (154 lbs) Champion

=== Kickboxing ===
- 2003 "Le Grand Tournoi" Tournament Winner

== Fight record ==
Muay Thai Record (Incomplete)
| Date | Result | Opponent | Event | Location | Method | Round | Time |
|---|---|---|---|---|---|---|---|
| 2008-02-23 | Win | (Belgium) Naim Dahou | Opération Muay Thai | France | Decision | 3 | 3:00 |
| 2007-04-07 | Win | (France) Mohamed Bourkhis | La Nuit des Superfights VII | Villebon, France | Decision | 3 | 3:00 |
| 2007-03-24 | Loss | (Belarus) Dmitry Shakuta | It's Showtime Trophy 2007 | Lommel, Belgium | Decision | 3 | 3:00 |
Fails to qualify for It's Showtime 75MAX Trophy 2008.
| 2006-12-16 | Win | (Netherlands) Youssef Akhnikh | La Nuit des Superfights V | Villebon, France | Decision | 3 | 3:00 |
| 2006-11-18 | Win | (Thailand) Samkor Kiatmontep | France vs Thaïlande | Levallois-Perret, France | Decision | 5 | 3:00 |
| 2006-05-26 | Draw | (Thailand) Buakaw Por.Pramuk | "Le Grand Tournoi" 2006 | Paris, France | Decision | 5 | 3:00 |
| 2006- | Win | (Italy) Matteo Sciacca | | Tours, France | KO (Left cross) | 1 | |
| 2006-03-02 | Win | (Thailand) Samranchai 96Peenang | France vs Thailande | Levallois Perret, France | Decision | 3 | 3:00 |
| 2005-07-02 | Win | (France) Wilfried Montagne | Le Grand Tournoi | Paris, France | Decision | 3 | 3:00 |
| 2005-05-09 | Loss | (France) Fouad Ezbiri | A1 - Lyon, Semi Final | Lyon, France | Decision | 3 | 3:00 |
| 2005-05-09 | Win | (Croatia) Goran Borović | A1 - Lyon, Quarter Final | Lyon, France | Decision | 3 | 3:00 |
| ? | Win | (Thailand) Nachaturat | | Morocco | KO (Low kick) | 1 | |
| ? | Win | (United Kingdom) Kevin Harper | | France | Decision | 5 | 3:00 |
| 2004-12-05 | Loss | (Thailand) Rambojiew Por.Tubtim | King's Birthday | Bangkok, Thailand | Decision | 3 | 3:00 |
| 2004-06-05 | Win | (France) Stéphane Nikiéma | La Finale du Grand Tournoi | Paris, France | Decision | | |
| 2004- | Win | (Serbia) Vesko Doukic | | Banja Luka, Bosnia | Decision | 5 | 3:00 |
| 2003-11-12 | Loss | (Thailand) Sakmongkol Sithchuchok | | Dubai, United Arab Emirates | Decision (Unanimous) | 12 | 2:00 |
| 2003-04-18 | Win | (France) Riad Rekhis | Le Grand Tournoi, Final | Paris, France | Decision | 3 | 3:00 |
Wins the Le Grand Tournoi Tournament title.
| 2003-04-18 | Win | (Thailand) Sakmongkol Sithchuchok | Le Grand Tournoi, Semi Final | Paris, France | Decision (Unanimous) | 3 | 3:00 |
| 2003-04-18 | Win | (Thailand) Nuengtrakarn Por Muang Ubon | Le Grand Tournoi, Quarter Final | Paris, France | Decision (Unanimous) | 3 | 3:00 |
| 2002-12-05 | Loss | (Thailand) Nuengtrakarn Por Muang Ubon | King's Birthday | Bangkok, Thailand | Decision | 5 | 3:00 |
| 2002-07-06 | Loss | (Thailand) Nuengtrakarn Por Muang Ubon | Le Grand Tournoi, Semi Final | Paris, France | TKO | 2 | |
| 2002-07-06 | Win | (Belarus) Dmitry Shakuta | Le Grand Tournoi, Quarter Final | Paris, France | Decision | 3 | 3:00 |
| 2002-03-02 | Win | (France) Rani Berbachi | Le Grand Tournoi, Final | Paris, France | Decision | 3 | 3:00 |
| 2002-03-02 | Win | (Croatia) Goran Borovic | Le Grand Tournoi, Semi Final | Paris, France | Decision | 3 | 3:00 |
| 2001-12-05 | Loss | (Japan) Kengo Yamagami | King's Birthday | Bangkok, Thailand | Decision | 5 | 2:00 |
| 2001-04-21 | Win | (Thailand) Kaolan Kaovichit | Les Gladiateurs du Millenium | Paris France | Decision | 8 | 2:00 |
| 2000-11-01 | Loss | (Japan) Masato | K-1 J-MAX 2000 | Tokyo, Japan | KO (Left hook) | 2 | 0:48 |
Loses the ISKA Oriental Rules World Welterweight (147 lbs) title.
| 2000- | Win | (Thailand) Orono Por Muang Ubon | | Las Vegas, USA | Decision | 5 | 3:00 |
Wins the ISKA Oriental Rules Intercontinental Super Welterweight (154 lbs) title.
| 2000-05-13 | Loss | (Thailand) Jongsanan Fairtex | ISKA Muay Thai | San Jose, California, USA | Decision (Majority) | 5 | 3:00 |
Loses the ISKA Oriental Rules Intercontinental Welterweight (147 lbs) title.
| 2000-03-17 | Win | (Thailand) Somkit Dermprakhon | ISKA Muay Thai | Las Vegas, Nevada, USA | Decision (Unanimous) | 5 | 3:00 |
Wins the ISKA Oriental Rules Intercontinental Welterweight (147 lbs) title.
| 1999-12-05 | Loss | (Thailand) Orono Por Muang Ubon | King's Birthday | Bangkok, Thailand | Decision | 5 | 3:00 |
| 1999-05-08 | Win | (Thailand) Somchai Sor.Nantana | Lumpinee Stadium | Bangkok, Thailand | KO (Punches) | 5 | |
Wins the Lumpinee Stadium Super Lightweight (140 lbs) title.
| 1999-02-27 | Win | (United States) Hector Pena | | Marseille, France | Decision (Unanimous) | 5 | 3:00 |
| 1998-12-05 | Win | (Thailand) Vihoknoi Chor.Malithong | King's Birthday | Bangkok, Thailand | KO | | |
| 1998- | Win | (Thailand) Therdkiat Sitthepitak | | France | TKO (Punches) | 3 | |
| 1998-04-24 | Win | (Thailand) Den Muangsurin | Muay Thai "Night" | Thiais, France | TKO (Punches) | 3 | |
Defends the ISKA Oriental Rules World Welterweight (147 lbs) title.
| ? | Loss | (Thailand) Towanlik | Lumpinee Stadium | Bangkok, Thailand | Decision | 5 | 3:00 |
| 1997-11-22 | Loss | (Thailand) Saimai Chor Suananant | Tournoi à 50 000 Dollars, Final | Le Cannet, France | KO (Punches) | 1 | |
| 1997-11-22 | Win | (France) Christian Garros | Tournoi à 50 000 Dollars, Semi Final | Le Cannet, France | Ext.R Decision | 4 | 3:00 |
| 1997-11-22 | Win | (France) François Pennachio | Tournoi à 50 000 Dollars, Quarter Final | Le Cannet, France | Decision | 3 | 3:00 |
| 1997-10-25 | Loss | (Japan) Takashi Ito | MAJKF | Bunkyo, Tokyo, Japan | Decision (split) | 5 | 3:00 |
| 1997- | Win | (Thailand) Saimai Chor Suananant | | Gagny, France | Decision | 5 | 3:00 |
Wins the ISKA Oriental Rules World Welterweight (147 lbs) title.
| 1996- | Loss | (Thailand) Saimai Chor Suananant | France Thailand au Bataclan | Paris, France | Decision | 5 | 3:00 |
Loses the World Muay Thai Welterweight (147 lbs) title.
| 1996-06-01 | Win | (France) Kader Marouf | | Paris, France | KO | 2 | |
| ? | Win | (Thailand) Bagjo Sor.Phanuch | Queen's Birthday | Thailand | KO | | |
| 1995- | Win | (France) Emmanuel N'toh | | France | Decision | 5 | 3:00 |
| 1995- | Win | (Thailand) | Rajadamnern Stadium | Bangkok, Thailand | KO | | |
| 1995- | Win | (Thailand) | Rajadamnern Stadium | Bangkok, Thailand | Decision | 5 | 3:00 |
| 1995- | Win | (Thailand) Sakaoduen Dejrat | Rajadamnern Stadium | Bangkok, Thailand | Decision | 5 | 3:00 |
| 1995- | Loss | (Thailand) Saenkeng Pinsinchai | | France | Decision | 5 | 3:00 |
| 1995-06 | Win | (France) Christian Garros | | France | Decision | 5 | 3:00 |
Wins the European Muay Thai title.
| 1995-02-18 | Win | (France) Yaaine Benhadj | Boxe thai | Paris, France | Decision | 5 | 3:00 |
| 1994-12-05 | Win | (Thailand) Sansing Muangsurin | King's Birthday | Chiang Rai, Thailand | KO | 4 | |
| 1992- | Win | (France) Philippe Sapan | | Aubervilliers, France | Decision | 5 | 3:00 |
Legend: Win Loss Draw/No contest Notes
