= Nongmoon Chomphutong =

Thai former professional Muay Thai fighter

- Born: Praphai Panyasiri; November 9, 1970 (age 56); Udon Thani, Mueang Udon Thani, Udon Thani, Thailand
- Native name: ประไพ ปัญญาศิริ
- Nickname: Lord Sticky-Rice Knee (ขุนเข่าข้าวหลาม)
- Height: 1.78 m (5 ft 10 in)
- Division: Lightweight; Super Lightweight; Welterweight
- Style: Muay Thai (Muay Khao)
- Stance: Orthodox
- Team: Chomphutong; Sasiprapa
- Trainer: Wichian Khaophan, Sit Saiyoo
- Years active: c. 1981–1997

Praphai Panyasiri (Thai: ประไพ ปัญญาศิริ; born November 9, 1970), known professionally as Nongmoon Chomphutong (Thai: หนองมน ชมภูทอง), is a Thai former professional Muay Thai fighter. He is a former Lumpinee Stadium Lightweight Champion who was active during the 1990s.

== Biography and career ==
Praphai Panyasiri was born on November 9, 1970, in Udon Thani, Mueang Udon Thani, Udon Thani, Thailand. He was introduced to Muay Thai at 11 years old by his father and began training at home with him. Around 14 years old he was brought to the Chomphutong gym where he would remain until switching to the Sasiprapa Gym around 1990.

Known for his heavy clinch knee style of fighting, Nongmoon rose to prominence in the Lumpinee Stadium entering the 1990s and captured the Lumpinee Stadium Lightweight title in 1991. He fought during the Golden Era of Muay Thai against many notable fighters including Therdkiat Sitthepitak, Chanchai Sor.Tamarangsri, Namphon Nongkeepahuyuth, Sakmongkol Sithchuchok, Coban Lookchaomaesaitong, and Dany Bill.

In 1992 Nongmoon moved to France where he would stay seven years. From there he had a second career training out of the Star Boxing Gym. After returning to Thailand he opened his own which he ran for a few years before moving to Macao for over 5 years. He now lives in the Udon Thani province where he is still involved in Muay Thai.

== Titles and honours ==
- Lumpinee Stadium
  - 1991 Lumpinee Stadium Lightweight (135 lb) Champion
- World Muaythai Council
  - 1992 WMC World Super Lightweight (140 lb) Champion

== Fight record ==
Muay Thai Record (Incomplete)
Date	Result	Opponent	Event	Location	Method	Round	Time
2002-08-17	Win			Macau	Decision	5	3:00
1997-11-10	Loss	(Suriname) Rayen Simson	The Night of the New Generation	Amsterdam, Netherlands	Decision	5	3:00
1997-11-08	Loss	(France) Tidiani Biga	Palais des sports Auguste Delaune	Saint-Denis, France	Decision	5	3:00
1997-02-01	Loss	(France) Dany Bill	Le Choc Des Champions	Gagny, France	TKO (doctor stoppage)	4	
For the WMC World Welterweight (147 lbs) title.
1996-	Win	(France) Maurad Djebli		France	Decision	5	3:00
1996-07-05	Win	(France) Bounid		France	Decision	5	3:00
1995-	Loss	(Netherlands) Jerry Morris		Oranjestad, Aruba	Decision	5	3:00
For the WPKL World title.
1995-	Loss	(Netherlands) Jerry Morris		Amsterdam, Netherlands	Decision	5	3:00
1993-06-04	Win	(France) Joel Cesar	Coubertin Stadium	Paris, France	Decision	5	3:00
1993-	Win	(Italy) Michele Araldi		France	Decision	5	3:00
1993-	Win	(Netherlands) Van Hove		Paris, France	Decision	5	3:00
1993-	Win	(France) Farouk Boudard		Paris, France	Decision	5	3:00
1992-05-29	Loss	(Thailand) Sakmongkol Sithchuchok	Lumpinee Stadium	Bangkok, Thailand	Decision	5	3:00
1992-	Win	(France) Dany Bill	Lumpinee Stadium	Bangkok, Thailand	Decision	5	3:00
Wins the WMC World Super Lightweight (140 lb) title.
1992-03-28	Win	(Thailand) Coban Lookchaomaesaitong	Lumpinee Stadium	Bangkok, Thailand	Decision	5	3:00
Wins the Lumpinee Stadium Lightweight (135 lbs) title.
1991-11-02	Win	(Thailand) Noenthong Singkhiri	Lumpinee Stadium	Bangkok, Thailand	Decision	5	3:00
1991-10-05	Win	(Thailand) Sakmongkol Sithchuchok	Lumpinee Stadium	Bangkok, Thailand	Decision	5	3:00
1991-07-16	Loss	(Thailand) Kamsanya Tor.Sittichai	Fairtex, Lumpinee Stadium	Bangkok, Thailand	KO	1	
1991-06-14	Loss	(Thailand) Namphon Nongkeepahuyuth	Lumpinee Stadium	Bangkok, Thailand	Decision	5	3:00
1991-05-29	Loss	(Thailand) Sakmongkol Sithchuchok	Lumpinee Stadium	Bangkok, Thailand	Decision	5	3:00
1991-04-30	Win	(Thailand) Petchseenin Petchweehan		Bangkok, Thailand	Decision	5	3:00
1991-02-05	Loss	(Thailand) Chanchai Sor.Tamarangsri	Lumpinee Stadium	Bangkok, Thailand	Decision	5	3:00
1991-01-16	Win	(Thailand) Petchsayam Kiatsingnoi		Bangkok, Thailand	Decision	5	3:00
1990-12-29	Win	(Thailand) Roj Lukrangsri	Lumpinee Stadium	Bangkok, Thailand	Decision	5	3:00
1990-	Win	(Thailand) Penthong Singkhiri		Bangkok, Thailand	Decision	5	3:00
1990-10-20	Win	(Thailand) Yodwittaya Sityodtong	Onesongchai, Lumpinee Stadium	Bangkok, Thailand	Decision	5	3:00
1990-	Win	(Thailand) Narongchai Thairungruang		Bangkok, Thailand	Decision	5	3:00
1990-08-31	Win	(Thailand) Den Muangsurin	Lumpinee Stadium	Bangkok, Thailand	Decision	5	3:00
1990-03-22	Loss	(Thailand) Saksit Muangsurin	Sam Palangnum, Khon Kaen Boxing Stadium	Thailand	Decision	5	3:00
1988-12-10	Loss	(Thailand) Therdkiat Sitthepitak		Udon Thani, Thailand	Decision	5	3:00
1988-11-11	Loss	(Thailand) Payu Lukthapfa	Petchyindee, Lumpinee Stadium	Bangkok, Thailand	Decision	5	3:00
1988-	Loss	(Thailand) Coban Lookchaomaesaitong		Thailand	KO		
1988-	Win	(Thailand) Paenthong Singkhiri		Bangkok, Thailand	Decision	5	3:00
1988-	Win	(Thailand) Sakmongkol Sithchuchok		Bangkok, Thailand	Decision	5	3:00
1988-	Win	(Thailand) Panomkon Kieteedin		Thailand	Decision	5	3:00
Legend: Win Loss Draw/No contest Notes
