= Ramon Dekkers =

Dutch professional Dutch Kickboxer fighter and kickboxer

- Dekkers in the 90s
- Born: Ramon Dekkers; 4 September 1969; Breda, North Brabant, Netherlands
- Died: 27 February 2013 (aged 43); Breda, North Brabant, Netherlands
- Other names: Diamond (เพชร); Turbine from Hell (ไอ้กังหันลมนรก)
- Height: 172 cm (5 ft 8 in)
- Division: Featherweight; Super Featherweight; Lightweight; Super Lightweight; Welterweight; Super Welterweight
- Style: Muay Thai (Muay Mat / Muay Bouk) / kickboxing
- Stance: Orthodox
- Team: Maeng Ho Gym; Team Dekkers; Golden Glory
- Trainer: Cor Hemmers
- Years active: 1986–2006

Kickboxing record
- Total: 224
- Wins: 186
- By knockout: 95
- Losses: 36
- Draws: 2

Mixed martial arts record
- Total: 1
- Losses: 1
- By submission: 1

Other information
- Notable relatives: Nick Hemmers
- Mixed martial arts record from Sherdog

Ramon Dekkers (4 September 1969 – 27 February 2013) was a Dutch professional Muay Thai fighter. He won five world titles across four weight classes in Muay Thai during the 1980s and 1990s. Nicknamed the "Turbine from Hell", he was a fan favorite due to his fast-paced, aggressive fighting style which resulted in many brutal fights and knockouts. He was also praised for his willingness to fight in Thailand, including challenging for the Lumpinee Stadium Lightweight title.

== Biography ==
=== Early years ===
Ramon Dekkers was born on 4 September 1969 in the city of Breda in the south of the Netherlands. He began learning martial arts at age 12, studying judo for half a year. He then switched to boxing.Cor Hemmers. After finishing his baker education Dekkers joined Maeng Ho Breda Gym. During Dekkers' early days of training his mother was at the gym every day and eventually she and Hemmers fell in love and got married.

In the beginning of his career Dekkers' manager was Clovis Depretz, the manager of legendary Rob Kaman. This was the reason why Kaman was at ringside during many of Dekkers' matches, including his farewell fight. They often trained together and became good friends. Dekkers and Kaman were dubbed by fight fans in Thailand as "The Double Dutch duo".

In his first fight at 16 years of age, Dekkers won in a spectacular knockout against a well-established older boxer. Although only weighing about 55 kg, his opponents found out sooner rather than later he was much stronger than he looked. As Dekkers kept on winning his matches by knockout, his reputation of an up-and-coming fighter spread in the Muay Thai community. He was awarded his first title at age 18, when he won the MTBN Dutch Championship on 15 November 1987. Dekkers defeated Kenneth Ramkisoen by knockout with a high kick. Previous to this fight the Dutchman had his first international contest against the reigning European champion, Richard Nam of France. Dekkers lost the fight on points. They would rematch each other a year later for the EMTA European Championship. This time Dekkers won the fight by knockout with a left hook, cross to body combination in the fourth round.

=== Rise to stardom ===
Dekkers challenged for the NKBB European Super featherweight Championship against Kevin Morris on 14 April 1988. He defeated his overmatched English opponent by unanimous decision. Over the next year the Dutchman would win a number of fights before defeating Mungkordum Sitchang for the IMTA World Lightweight title. Towards the end of 1988 he faced Gilbert Ballantine from the respected Chakuriki Gym in Amsterdam, Netherlands. Dekkers lost by decision after being outworked by Ballantine over five rounds. This match would spark the beginning of a fierce rivalry between the two men—they would fight two more times with both of them splitting wins.

On 18 February 1990, Dekkers truly moved onto the world stage. In Amsterdam, he faced the reigning Lumpinee champion Namphon Nongkeepahuyuth. He inflicted a rare defeat on Namphon after five rounds to win the vacant IMF World Light Welterweight title. The two fighters would meet again two months later in a rematch in Bangkok, Thailand. This time the Dutchman, who just had knocked out the number 1 ranked Lumpinee fighter Cherry Sor.Wanich in Amsterdam, was unable to defeat Namphon and lost a close decision. He returned to Thailand the same year to meet Issara Sakgreerin in a losing bid for Sakkreerin's Lumpinee Stadium Lightweight title.

The most notable rival of Dekkers was multiple Lumpinee champion and living legend Coban Lookchaomaesaitong. In their first encounter on 21 April 1991, Dekkers was knocked out with a left hook. This would be the first of four meetings between the men from 1991 to 1993, in what became one of the biggest rivalries in Muay Thai history. In the rematch, Dekkers won in highlight worthy fashion via devastating knockout. In the third outing of their rivalry, Dekkers was defeated by decision after five gruelling rounds, but he won the fourth and final fight, evening his score against Coban. The Coban vs. Dekkers fights have been rated as the best by any standards, by Muay Thai fans worldwide.

Dekkers ended 1991 with two wins by knockout over French champion Joel Cesar and a decision loss against Sakmongkol Sithchuchok. Between 1992 and 1996, Dekkers would take part in a number of high-profile bouts, defeating fighters such as Jo Prestia, Rittichai Tor. Chalermchai, Mehmet Kaya and Hector Pena. He would also suffer a few defeats, losing his second fight against Jo Prestia as well as failing to defeat among others Jaroenthong Kiatbanchong, Dida Diafat, Orono Por.MuangUbon, and Den Muangsurin.

On 16 November 1996, Dekkers defeated Hassan Kassrioui via unanimous decision in Amsterdam, Netherlands to win the World Professional Kickboxing League (WPKL) World Super Welterweight Championship. By this point, despite the victory, injuries were taking their toll and his career was winding to a close. A month later, he faced Jomhod Kiatadisak in Bangkok, Thailand for the vacant WMTA World Super welterweight title. Dekkers lost the bout by decision. In a memorable match against Rayen Simson in Roosendaal, Netherlands in 1997 both fighters went to the canvas at the same time from a left hook. Dekkers injured his eye in the process and had to give up, losing the fight by technical knockout at the end of the second round. He would go back to winning ways by defeating Saengtiennoi Sor. Rungrot, avenging his two losses against the "Deadly Kisser".

=== Farewell fight ===
On 18 March 2001, Ramon Dekkers fought his farewell fight against Marino Deflorin in Rotterdam, the Netherlands. The fight ended in the fourth round with Dekkers knocking a game Deflorin out with a left hook. After the fight, Dekkers joined his Golden Glory team members center stage for a finale, Rob Kaman came down the rampart, presenting a Golden Glory torch to Dekkers, who in turn passed it to each team member, as video clips of his victories were shown on the display screens.

=== Comeback ===
After his retirement Dekkers kept himself busy training his two teams, Team Dekkers and Golden Glory. In 2005, however, Dekkers surprised the fighting world by agreeing upon a contract with K-1. He was, however, to fight under MMA rules against Genki Sudo. Dekkers, who never had fought MMA and took the fight on a few days' notice, lost by heel hook.

However, his management arranged another regular K-1 rules fight. Dekkers fought American Duane Ludwig in a superfight during the K-1 Max 2005 event. A few days before the fight Dekkers injured himself, tearing a ligament in his right shoulder. The entire fight he could only punch with his left arm. Nevertheless, Dekkers knocked Ludwig down in every round, and won the fight by decision. His final retirement was a superfight against Joerie Mes at the K-1 World Grand Prix 2006 in Amsterdam event on 13 May 2006, this event was organised by Dutch organisation It's Showtime in collaboration with the Japanese K-1 organisation. After both fighters suffered a knockdown in the second round, it was Mes who earned the decision victory. Immediately after the fight Dekkers announced his final retirement.

=== Fame and glory in Thailand ===
Ramon Dekkers fought some of the best fighters Thailand had to offer. Especially in the beginning it was hard for Dekkers to fight at full Thai rules. The scoring methods were different from what he was used to in Europe. "In Thailand it is very difficult to win other than by knocking your opponent out. It has happened to me in many of my fights that I have lost on "points" while fighting in Thailand. It's normal over there losing on points but it can be very frustrating," Dekkers stated in an interview in 1993. Dekkers also blamed some of his losses to his many injuries. Despite his defeats the Thai fight fans had a great respect for Dekkers' determination and ability.

=== Royal recognition ===
On the occasion of the 85th anniversary of the King of Thailand, Dekkers received a royal award from the Thai Royal Family for his services to the sport. The Dutchman was also appointed ambassador of all foreign fighters in Thailand. "This is very important to me. It is the greatest recognition that I can get for what I have achieved in this sport," said Dekkers, after the presentation by the Thai princess Ubolratana Rajakanya, the eldest daughter of King Bhumibol Adulyadej.

=== Death ===
On 27 February 2013, Dekkers died at the age of 43, after reportedly feeling light-headed while training in his hometown Breda. He was riding his bike when he collapsed. A few bystanders attempted to assist him before emergency services arrived and attempted to revive him to no avail. It was reported that myocardial infarction (heart attack) was the cause of death. Hundreds of family members and friends bid farewell to Dekkers at his funeral at the Zuylen cemetery. The funeral procession was accompanied by dozens of members of the Motorbike Club Satudarah, as well as an airplane with a banner reading "the Diamond is 4ever, rest in peace".

== Titles and accomplishments ==
Muay Thai

- Muay Thai Bond Nederland
  - 1987 MTBN Dutch Featherweight (126 lbs) Champion
- European Muay Thai Association
  - 1988 EMTA European Featherweight (126 lbs) Champion
- Nederlandse Kick Boxing Bond
  - 1988 NKBB European Super Featherweight (130 lbs) Champion
- International Muay Thai Association
  - 1989 IMTA World Lightweight (135 lbs) Champion
- International Muay Thai Federation
  - 1990 IMTF World Super Lightweight (140 lbs) Champion
    - Two successful title defenses
- World Muay Thai Association
  - 1992 WMTA World Super Lightweight (140lbs) Champion
    - One successful title defense
  - 1995 WMTA World Welterweight (147 lbs) Champion
- World Professional Kickboxing League
  - 1996 WPKL World Super Welterweight (154 lbs) Champion
    - Two successful title defenses
- Awards
  - 2013 the Royal Award from the Thai royal family for his services to the sport

== Fight record ==
Kickboxing record (incomplete)
186 wins (95 (T)KOs), 36 losses, 2 draws
Date	Result	Opponent	Event	Location	Method	Round	Time
2006-05-13	Loss	(Netherlands) Joerie Mes	K-1 World Grand Prix 2006 in Amsterdam	Amsterdam, Netherlands	Decision (unanimous)	3	3:00
2005-07-20	Win	(United States) Duane Ludwig	K-1 World MAX 2005 Final, Super Fight	Yokohama, Japan	Decision (unanimous)	3	3:00
2001-03-18	Win	(Switzerland) Marino Deflorin	2 Hot 2 Handle III: Simply The Best	Rotterdam, Netherlands	KO (left hook)	4	0:18
2000-11-01	Draw	(Japan) Akeomi Nitta	K-1 J-MAX 2000	Tokyo, Japan	Decision (majority)	5	3:00
2000-01-25	Loss	(Japan) Takayuki Kohiruimaki	K-1 Rising 2000	Nagasaki, Japan	TKO (doctor stoppage)	1	3:00
1998-11-14	Win	(Japan) Kenichi Ogata	Shootboxing "Ground Zero"	Chiyoda, Tokyo, Japan	KO (left hook)	4	2:58
Defends the WPKL World Super Welterweight (154 lbs) title.
1998-05-23	Loss	(Morocco) Abdelkader Tarzati	Muay Thai Champions League - Part II, 1st Round	Roosendaal, Netherlands	Decision (unanimous)	3	3:00
1998-04-26	Win	(Japan) Hiromu Yoshitaka	RKS Presents Shoot the Shooto XX	Yokohama, Japan	Decision (unanimous)	5	3:00
1997-11-22	Loss	(France) Dany Bill	King of the Ring	Paris, France	Decision (unanimous)	5	3:00
1997-11-10	Win	(Morocco) Hassan Kassrioui	Night of Dynamite	Amsterdam, Netherlands	TKO (punches)	3	
Defends the WPKL World Super Welterweight (154 lbs) title.
1997-07-13	Loss	(Thailand) Namkabuan Nongkeepahuyuth	La Nuit des Titans	Rabat, Morocco	Decision (unanimous)	5	3:00
1997-06-01	Win	(Netherlands) Gerald Mamadeus	Battle of Amsterdam	Amsterdam, Netherlands	KO (low kicks)	3	
1997-04-20	Win	(Thailand) Sangtiennoi Sor.Rungroj	The Night of No Mercy	Amsterdam, Netherlands	Decision (unanimous)	5	3:00
1997-03-23	Loss	(Suriname) Rayen Simson	Muay Thai Gala: The Night of War	Roosendaal, Netherlands	TKO (corner stoppage)	2	3:00
1997-03-05	Win	(Thailand) Wattana Sit-Or	WPKL gala	Dortmund, Germany	KO (punches)	1	
1997-02-27	Loss	(Netherlands) Jerry Morris	Muay Thai Gala Hattem	Hattem, Netherlands	Decision (unanimous)	5	3:00
1997-02-01	Win	(Thailand) Pursan	Federation Royale Moracaine	Rabat, Morocco	KO (right high kick)	2	
1996-12-05	Loss	(Thailand) Jomhod Kiatadisak	Muay Thai World Championships in honor of the King	Bangkok, Thailand	Decision (unanimous)	5	3:00
For the vacant WMTA World Super Welterweight (154 lbs) title.
1996-11-16	Win	(Morocco) Hassan Kassrioui	Night of the New Generation	Amsterdam, Netherlands	Decision (unanimous)	5	3:00
Wins the vacant WPKL World Super Welterweight (154 lbs) title.
1996-	Loss	(France) Francois Pennacchio		Milan, Italy	Decision (unanimous)	9	2:00
1996-07-20	Loss	(Thailand) Saimai Chor.Suananan	Onesongchai, Phanom Rung Historical Park	Chaloem Phra Kiat, Thailand	Decision	5	3:00
1996-03-16	Win	(United States) Fernando Calleros	MAJKF	Bunkyo, Tokyo, Japan	KO (right hook)	1	2:45
1995-12-05	Loss	(Thailand) Den Muangsurin	King's Birthday	Macau	Decision (unanimous)	5	3:00
1995-11-17	Loss	(Thailand) Teerapong Sit Korayuth	Fairtex, Lumpinee Stadium	Bangkok, Thailand	Decision (unanimous)	5	3:00
For the vacant ISKA Intercontinental Muay Thai Welterweight (147 lbs) title.
1995-10-15	Win	(United States) Hector Pena	MAJKF	Bunkyo, Tokyo, Japan	TKO (corner stoppage)	2	2:35
1995-	Loss	(Thailand) Cherry Sor.Wanich	Lumpinee Stadium	Bangkok, Thailand	Decision	5	3:00
1995-07-17	Win	(Thailand) Jamesbond Na Udomsak	Rajadamnern Stadium	Bangkok, Thailand	KO (left hook)	4	
1995-06-02	Win	(Japan) Taro Minato	MAJKF	Bunkyo, Tokyo, Japan	KO (body shot)	1	1:33
1995-04-08	Loss	(Thailand) Orono Por.MuangUbon		Bangkok, Thailand	Decision	5	3:00
1995-01-27	Win	(Thailand) Pralomran Nattawhut	The Fight Night in Breda	Breda, Netherlands	KO (punches)	3	
1994-10-09	Win	(France) Mourad Djebli		Milan, Italy	TKO	3	
1994-07-23	Win	(New Zealand) John Bing	Strictly Business	Melbourne, Australia	TKO (referee stoppage)	4	2:58
1994-06-25	Win	(Thailand) Coban Lookchaomaesaitong		Paris, France	Decision (unanimous)	5	3:00
1994-02-20	Win	(Netherlands) Gilbert Ballantine	The Night of the Thriller	Amsterdam, Netherlands	Decision (unanimous)	5	3:00
Wins the IKBF World title.
1994-02-05	Loss	(France) Dida Diafat	Canal + Presents Muay Thai in Bercy	Paris, France	Decision (unanimous)	5	3:00
For Muay Thai World -64kg title.
1993-12-19	Win	(Germany) Mehmet Kaya		Paris, France	TKO (low kicks)	2	
1993-12-04	Loss	(Thailand) Jaroenthong Kiatbanchong	King's Birthday	Samut Prakan, Thailand	Decision	5	3:00
For the WMTC World Super Lightweight (140 lbs) title.
1993-10	Loss	(Thailand) Den Muangsurin		Thailand	Decision (unanimous)	5	3:00
1993-06-06	Win	(Thailand) Dechasawin	The War in Rotterdam	Rotterdam, Netherlands	KO (body shot)	2	
1993-03-26	Loss	(France) Dida Diafat	Muay Thai Gala in Paris	Paris, France	TKO (doctor stoppage)	3	
1993-02-02	Loss	(Thailand) Chanoy Pontawee	Thaiboxing in Hamburg	Hamburg, Germany	Decision (unanimous)	5	3:00
1992-11-29	Win	(Thailand) Ritthichai Lookchaomaesaitong		Lampang, Thailand	Decision	5	3:00
1992-09-20	Loss	(Netherlands) Gilbert Ballantine	The Night of Truth	Amsterdam, Netherlands	Decision (unanimous)	5	3:00
For the IKBF World Super Lightweight (140 lbs) title.
1992-06-20	Loss	(France) Jo Prestia		Paris, France	Decision (unanimous)	5	3:00
For the World Welterweight (147 lbs) title.
1992-04-26	Loss	(Thailand) Orono Por.MuangUbon	Muay Thai Spectacle in Bangkok	Bangkok, Thailand	Decision	5	3:00
1992-04-09	Win	(France) Jo Prestia		Paris, France	Decision (unanimous)	5	3:00
1992-02-28	Loss	(Thailand) Coban Lookchaomaesaitong	Crocodile Farm	Samut Prakan, Thailand	Decision (unanimous)	5	3:00
For the vacant IMTF World Welterweight (147 lbs) title.
1991-11-26	Loss	(Thailand) Sakmongkol Sithchuchok	Onesongchai, Lumpinee Stadium	Bangkok, Thailand	Decision (unanimous)	5	3:00
1991-10-25	Win	(France) Joel Cesar	Thriller in Paris II	Paris, France	KO (left hook)	3	2:55
1991-09-23	Win	(France) Joel Cesar	Thriller in Paris I	Paris, France	KO (left hook)	1	2:30
1991-09-03	Loss	(Thailand) Sangtiennoi Sor.Rungroj	Onesongchai, Lumpinee Stadium	Bangkok, Thailand	Decision (unanimous)	5	3:00
1991-08-06	Win	(Thailand) Coban Lookchaomaesaitong	Onesongchai, Lumpinee Stadium	Bangkok, Thailand	KO (right cross)	1	
1991-04-21	Loss	(Thailand) Coban Lookchaomaesaitong	IKL	Paris, France	KO (left hook)	1	1:00
1991-	Win	(Thailand) Sombat Sor.Thanikul	Lumpinee Stadium	Bangkok, Thailand	Decision (unanimous)	5	3:00
1991-03-22	Loss	(Thailand) Sangtiennoi Sor.Rungroj	MAJKF	Bunkyo, Tokyo, Japan	Decision (unanimous)	5	3:00
1990-12-18	Loss	(Thailand) Boonchai Tor.Thuwanon	MAJKF	Bunkyo, Tokyo, Japan	Decision (unanimous)	5	3:00
1990-11-27	Loss	(Thailand) Issara Sakgreerin	Onesongchai, Lumpinee Stadium	Bangkok, Thailand	Decision (unanimous)	5	3:00
For the Lumpinee Stadium Lightweight (135 lbs) title.
1990-08-31	Loss	(Thailand) Superlek Sornisaan	Onesongchai, Lumpinee Stadium	Bangkok, Thailand	Decision	5	3:00
1990-04-24	Loss	(Thailand) Namphon Nongkeepahuyuth	Onesongchai, Lumpinee Stadium	Bangkok, Thailand	Decision (unanimous)	5	3:00
1990-04-01	Win	(England) Thomas McArtney	Holland vs. England	Amsterdam, Netherlands	KO (left knee)	2	
1990-03-27	Win	(Thailand) Cherry Sor.Wanich	Muay Thai vs. Europe, Jaap Eden Hall	Amsterdam, Netherlands	KO (left hook)	1	
1990-02-18	Win	(Thailand) Namphon Nongkeepahuyuth		Amsterdam, Netherlands	Decision (unanimous)	5	3:00
Wins IMTF World Super Lightweight (140 lbs) title.
1989-12-02	Win	(Thailand) Mungkordun Sitchang		Rouen, France	Decision (unanimous)	5	3:00
Wins IMTA World Lightweight (135 lbs) title.
1989-10-27	Loss	(Morocco) Khalid Rahilou	Halle Georges Carpentier	Paris, France	Decision (unanimous)	12	2:00
For the WKA Full Contact World title.
1989-10-08	Loss	(Netherlands) Gilbert Ballantine	Muay Thai Boxing Jaap Edenhall	Amsterdam, Netherlands	Decision (unanimous)	5	3:00
1989	Loss	(Thailand) Daris Sor.Thanikul		France	Decision (unanimous)	5	3:00
1989-01-04	Win	(Sweden) Michael Partanen	Maaspoort	Den Bosch, Netherlands	KO	5	
1989-01	Win	(Thailand) Anakhoun Suwannee		Breda, Netherlands	KO (right uppercut)	2	
1988-11-20	Loss	(Cape Verde) Joao Vieira		Amsterdam, Netherlands	KO (right cross)	5	
1988	Win	(Morocco) Mourad Jelbi		Italy			
1988-	loss	(Netherlands) Michel Ubbergen					
1988-06-19	Win	(England) Mike Morris		Amsterdam, Netherlands	Decision (unanimous)	5	3:00
1988-04-14	Win	(England) Kevin Morris	Champions in Action	Eindhoven, Netherlands	Decision (unanimous)	5	3:00
Wins NKBB European Super Featherweight (130 lbs) title.
1988-02-27	Win	(France) Andre Richard-Nam		Amsterdam, Netherlands	KO (left hook)	4	
Wins the EMTA European Featherweight (126 lbs) title.
1988-02-06	Win	(France) Khaled Hebieb		Paris, France	KO (left hook to the body)	1	
1987-11-15	Win	(Netherlands) Kenneth Ramkisoen		Breda, Netherlands	KO (high kick)	2	
Wins the MTBN Dutch Featherweight (126 lbs) title.
1987-	Win	(Germany) Tune			KO	1	
1987-03-21	Loss	(France) Andre Richard-Nam		Lille, France	Decision (unanimous)	5	3:00
1986	Win	(Netherlands) L. Cairo		Amsterdam, Netherlands	KO		
1986-10-05	Win	(Netherlands) Boyd		Rotterdam, Netherlands	Decision (unanimous)	3	2:00
1986-	Win	(Netherlands) Andre Masseurs		Netherlands	KO	2	
1986-02-02	Win	(Netherlands) Kees Twigt		Rotterdam, Netherlands	KO	1	

== Mixed martial arts record ==
Res.	Record	Opponent	Method	Event	Date	Round	Time	Location	Notes
Loss	0-1	(Japan) Genki Sudo	Submission (heel hook)	Hero's 1	26 March 2005	1	2:54	Saitama, Japan	

== See also ==
- List of male kickboxers
- List of K-1 events
