= Sakmongkol Sithchuchok =

Thai professional Muay Thai fighter and kickboxer

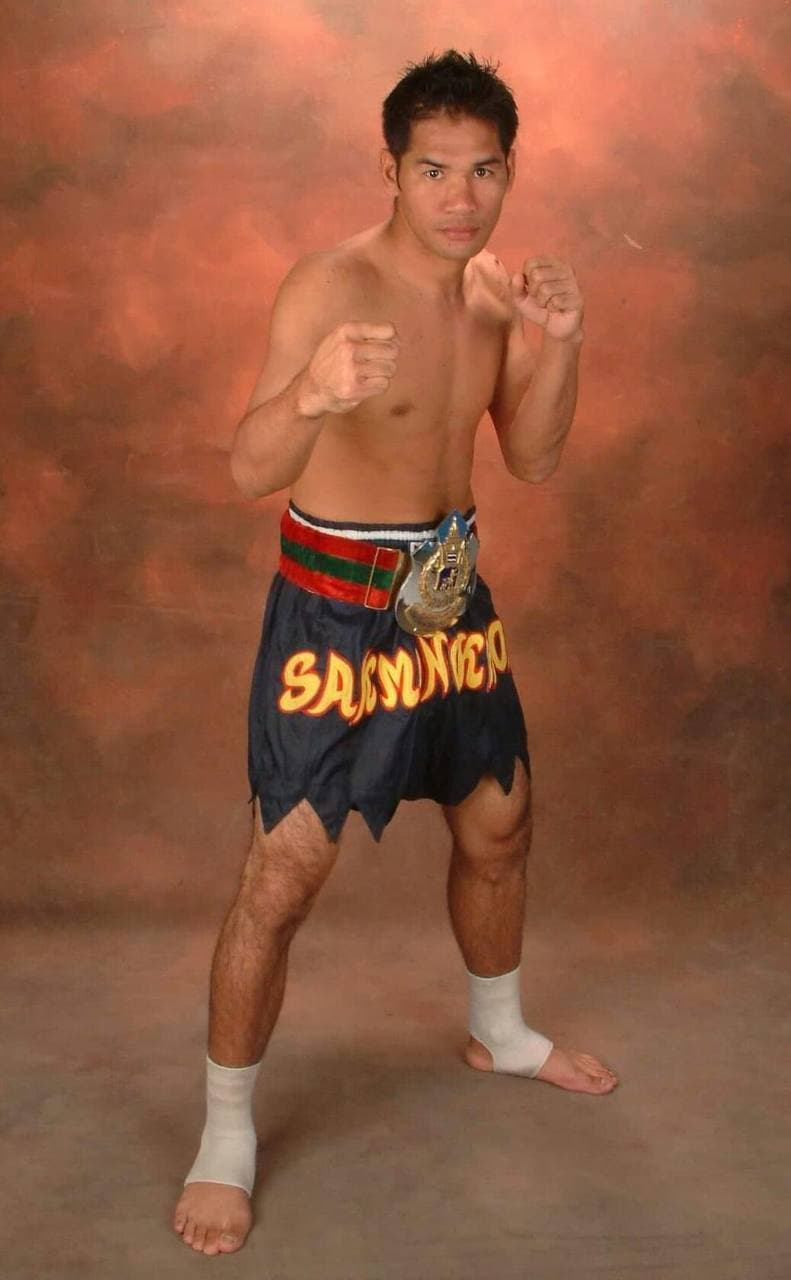
- Born: Mongkhon Kalek; July 6, 1973 (age 53); Si Maha Phot, Prachinburi
- Native name: มงคล กะเล็ก
- Nickname: Jade-faced Kicker (จอมเตะหน้าหยก)
- Height: 175 cm (5 ft 9 in)
- Division: Super Featherweight; Lightweight; Light Welterweight; Welterweight; Middleweight
- Style: Muay Thai (Muay Bouk / Muay Tae)
- Stance: Southpaw
- Fighting out of: Bangkok, Thailand
- Team: UAE IFMA National Team
- Years active: c. 1981-2004

Kickboxing record
- Total: 255
- Wins: 231
- Losses: 20
- Draws: 4

Other information
- Spouse: Kob Kalek
- Notable students: Reza Goodary

Mongkhon Kalek (Thai: มงคล กะเล็ก; born 6 July 1973), known professionally as Sakmongkol Sithchuchok (Thai: ศักดิ์มงคล ศิษย์ชูโชค), is a Thai former professional Muay Thai fighter and kickboxer. He is a former Lumpinee Stadium Lightweight Champion who was famous during the 1990s and 2000s.

== Biography and career ==
Sakmongkol was a champion in the 1990s, considered to be the Muay Thai "Golden Era". He is known for his devastating left kicks and tough body that could take a lot of punishment while still able to continue to push the fight forward. He started training at 6 years old, and had his first fight when he was 8. He made it to Lumpinee Stadium at the age of 12. At age 18 he fought and defeated the Dutch legend, Rammon Dekkers. His most famous battles, a total of 7 fights, were against Jongsanan Fairtex. Their fifth fight became known as the "Elbow Fight" and is considered one of the most brutal and best Muay Thai fights of all time. Monghukon is currently the head coach of UAE national Muaythai (IFMA) team.

== Titles and accomplishments ==
- Lumpinee Stadium
  - 1993 Lumpinee Stadium Fight of the Year (vs Jongsanan Fairtex)
  - 1994 Lumpinee Stadium Lightweight (135 lbs) Champion
  - 1996 Beer Chang Tournament Runner-up
- Sports Writers Association of Thailand
  - 1996 Fight of the Year (vs Pairot Wor.Walapon)
  - 1998 Fight of the Year (vs Orono Por.MuangUbon)
  - 1999 Fight of the Year (vs Perry Ubeda)
- World Professional Kickboxing League
  - 1999 WPKL Middleweight World Champion
- World Muay Thai Council
  - 1996 WMTC Middleweight World Champion

== Fight record ==
Kickboxing Record
232 Wins, 19 Losses, 4 Draws
Date	Result	Opponent	Event	Location	Method	Round	Time
2014-10-19	Win	(Japan) Go Yokoyama	WKO: Kumite Energy	Osaka, Japan	KO	2	
2011-08-20	Win	(Brazil) Cosmo Alexandre	Battle in the Desert 3	Nevada, United States	Decision (Unanimous)	5	3:00
2011-06-25	Win	(United States) Jamez Martinez	Ring of Fire Muay Thai Mayhem	United States	TKO (Broken arm)	3	
2007-02-17	Loss	(France) Abdallah Mabel	La Nuit des Titans II	Tours, France	Decision	5	3:00
2006-11-26	Win	(England) Peter Crooke	Muay Thai Super Fights	Wolverhampton, England	Decision (Unanimous)	5	3:00
2004-12-18	Win	(Australia) John Wayne Parr	K-1 Challenge 2004 Oceania vs World	Gold Coast, Australia	2 Ext R. Decision (Split)	5	3:00
2003-11-12	Win	(France) Morad Sari		Dubai, United Arab Emirates	Decision (Unanimous)	12	2:00
2003-11-08	Loss	(France) Farid Villaume		Tieste, Italy	Decision (Unanimous)	5	3:00
Fight was for MTA Middleweight World title.
2003-04-18	Loss	(France) Morad Sari	Le Grand Tournoi	Paris, France	Decision (Unanimous)	3	3:00
2003-04-18	Win	(France) Joseph Yaucat Guendi	Le Grand Tournoi	Paris, France	Decision (Unanimous)	3	3:00
2003-02-16	Loss	(Netherlands) Stjepan Veselic		Rotterdam, Netherlands	TKO (Broken nose)	2	
Fight was for WPKL Middleweight World title.
2002-09-07	Loss	(China) Zheng Yusong	Chinese Kung Fu vs Muaythai	Guangzhou, China	Decision (Unanimous)	5	
2002-06-01	Win	(Netherlands) Perry Ubeda		Marseille, France	TKO (Retirement)	5	2:00
2001-07-13	Win	(Japan) Kengo Yamagami	MAJKF KICK GUTS	Tokyo, Japan	Decision	5	3:00
2001-03-24	Loss	(Thailand) Pajonsuk SuperPro Samui	Lumpinee Stadium	Bangkok, Thailand	Decision	5	3:00
2000-03-18	Win	(Netherlands) Perry Ubeda		Las Vegas, Nevada, USA	DQ (Illegal elbow)	4	
1999-12-05	Win	(Netherlands) Perry Ubeda	Kings Birthday 1999	Bangkok, Thailand	TKO (Left body kick)	5	0:22
Defends the WMTC Middleweight World title.
1999-10-30	Win	(Morocco) Hassan Ettaki	Night of Sensation	Rotterdam, Netherlands	Decision (Unanimous)	5	3:00
Wins WPKL Middleweight World title.
1999-08-12	Win	(Netherlands) Rayen Simson	Queen's Birthday Show	Nonthaburi, Thailand	Decision (Unanimous)	5	3:00
1999-03-06	NC	(Thailand) Kriangkrai Sor.Worapin	Lumpinee Stadium	Bangkok, Thailand	Dismissal	5	
For the Lumpinee Stadium Welterweight (147 lbs) title. The referee judged that Sakmongkol wasn't fighting up to his abilities.
1998-11-14	Loss	(Thailand) Jomhod Kiatadisak	Muay Thai Champions League	Amsterdam, Netherlands	TKO (Doctor Stoppage)	2	3:00
Fight was for Muay Thai Champions League title.
1998-11-14	Win	(Netherlands) Jerry Morris	Muay Thai Champions League	Amsterdam, Netherlands	Decision (Unanimous)	3	3:00
Wins the WPKL Middleweight World title.
1998-08-28	Win	(Thailand) Orono Por.MuangUbon	Wan Songchai Promotions	Bangkok, Thailand	Decision	5	3:00
1998-08-09	Win	(Australia) Sam Soliman	Thailand vs Australia	Australia	Decision (Unanimous)	5	3:00
1998-07-19	Win	(Thailand) Orono Por.MuangUbon	ITV	Chachoengsao, Thailand	Decision	5	3:00
Receives Yodmuaythai trophy.
1998-06-27	Draw	(Thailand) Orono Por.MuangUbon	Lumpinee Stadium	Bangkok, Thailand	Decision	5	3:00
1998-05-02	Win	(Morocco) Hassan Kassrioui	Muay Thai Champions League	Amsterdam, Netherlands	KO (Right Hook)	2	
1998-05-02	Win	(Netherlands) Gerold Mamadeus	Muay Thai Champions League	Amsterdam, Netherlands	Decision	3	3:00
1998-03-21	Win	(Thailand) Orono Por.MuangUbon	Lumpinee Stadium	Bangkok, Thailand	Decision	5	3:00
1997-11-11	Loss	(Thailand) Kriangkrai Sor.Worapin	Lumpinee Stadium	Bangkok, Thailand	Decision	5	3:00
For the Lumpinee Stadium Welterweight (147 lbs) title.
1997-10-05	Win	(France) Dany Bill		Paris, France	Decision (Split)	5	3:00
Defends the WMTC Middleweight World title.
1997-02-28	Win	(Thailand) Pairot Wor.Wolapon	Lumpinee Stadium	Bangkok, Thailand	TKO (High kick)	3	
1997-02-08	Win	(Thailand) Namkabuan Nongkeepahuyuth		Phichit province, Thailand	KO (Punches)	1	2:08
1996-12-17	Win	(Thailand) Wanlop Sor.Satpahrn	Lumpinee Stadium	Bangkok, Thailand	Decision (Unanimous)	5	3:00
1996-10-26	Loss	(Thailand) Pairot Wor.Wolapon	Beer Chang Tournament, Final	Bangkok, Thailand	Decision	5	3:00
1996-09-21	Win	(Thailand) Sangtiennoi Sor.Rungroj	Beer Chang Tournament, Semi Final	Bangkok, Thailand	Decision	5	3:00
1996-09-01	Win	(Switzerland) Marino Deflorin	K-1 Revenge 1996	Japan	Decision (Unanimous)	5	3:00
1996-08-03	Win	(Thailand) Jongsanan Fairtex	Beer Chang Tournament	Bangkok, Thailand	KO	3	3:00
1996-06-29	Win	(Thailand) Pairot Wor.Wolapon	Beer Chang Tournament	Bangkok, Thailand	Decision	5	3:00
1996-05-18	Loss	(Thailand) Namkabuan Nongkeepahuyuth	Beer Chang Tournament	Bangkok, Thailand	Decision	5	3:00
1996-03-31	Win	(Netherlands) Ivan Hippolyte		Pattaya, Thailand	Decision (Unanimous)	5	3:00
Wins the WMTC Muay Thai Middleweight World title.
1995-04-25	Loss	(Thailand) Jongsanan Fairtex	Lumpinee Stadium	Bangkok, Thailand	KO	2	
1995-02-04	Win	(Thailand) Sangtiennoi Sor.Rungroj	Lumpinee Stadium	Bangkok, Thailand	Decision	5	3:00
1995-01-09	Win	(Thailand) Jongsanan Fairtex	Lumpinee Stadium	Bangkok, Thailand	KO	4	
1994-11-18	Win	(Thailand) Sangtiennoi Sor.Rungroj	Lumpinee Stadium	Bangkok, Thailand	Decision	5	3:00
1994-10-04	Win	(Thailand) Namkabuan Nongkeepahuyuth	Lumpinee Stadium	Bangkok, Thailand	Decision	5	3:00
1994-09-09	Win	(Thailand) Namkabuan Nongkeepahuyuth	Lumpinee Stadium	Bangkok, Thailand	Decision	5	3:00
1994-07-16	Win	(Netherlands) Leo de Snoo	Uttaradit Stadium	Uttaradit, Thailand	Decision	5	3:00
1994-	Win	(Thailand) Chandet Sor.Prantalay	Lumpinee Stadium	Bangkok, Thailand	Decision	5	3:00
1994-	Loss	(Thailand) Jongsanan Fairtex	Lumpinee Stadium	Bangkok, Thailand	KO	1	
1994-	Win	(Thailand) Panomrunglek Chor.Sawat	Lumpinee Stadium	Bangkok, Thailand	Decision	5	3:00
1994-02-13	Loss	(Thailand) Chandet Sor.Prantalay	Lumpinee Stadium	Bangkok, Thailand	Decision	5	3:00
Loses the Lumpinee Stadium Lightweight (135 lbs) title.
1994-01-08	Win	(Thailand) Panomrunglek Chor.Sawat	Lumpinee Stadium	Bangkok, Thailand	Decision	5	3:00
Wins the Lumpinee Stadium Lightweight (135 lbs) title.
1993-10-30	Loss	(Thailand) Jongsanan Fairtex	Lumpinee Stadium	Bangkok, Thailand	Decision	5	3:00
1993-10-05	Win	(Thailand) Jongsanan Fairtex	Lumpinee Stadium	Bangkok, Thailand	Decision	5	3:00
1993-07-30	Win	(Thailand) Panomrunglek Chor.Sawat	Lumpinee Stadium	Bangkok, Thailand	Decision	5	3:00
1993-06-11	Win	(Thailand) Chanchai Sor.Tamarangsri	Lumpinee Stadium	Bangkok, Thailand	Decision	5	3:00
1993-05-04	Loss	(Thailand) Jongsanan Fairtex	Lumpinee Stadium	Bangkok, Thailand	Decision	5	3:00
1993-03-29	Loss	(Thailand) Namkabuan Nongkeepahuyuth	Kiatsingnoi, Rajadamnern Stadium	Bangkok, Thailand	Decision	5	3:00
1993-01-29	Win	(Thailand) Nuathoranee Thongracha	Lumpinee Stadium	Bangkok, Thailand	Decision	5	3:00
1992-12-05	Win	(Thailand) Chanchai Sor.Tamarangsri	Lumpinee Stadium	Bangkok, Thailand	Decision	5	3:00
1992-10-28	Win	(Thailand) Samaiseuk Por.Pleumkamol	Lumpinee Stadium	Bangkok, Thailand	Decision	5	3:00
1992-09-	Loss	(Thailand) Sangtiennoi Sor.Rungroj	Lumpinee Stadium	Bangkok, Thailand	Decision	5	3:00
1992-08-	Loss	(Thailand) Cherry Sor.Wanich	Lumpinee Stadium	Bangkok, Thailand	Decision	5	3:00
1992-07-21	Win	(Thailand) Orono Por.MuangUbon	Lumpinee Stadium	Bangkok, Thailand	Decision	5	3:00
1992-06-30	Win	(Thailand) Chanchai Sor.Tamarangsri	Lumpinee Stadium	Bangkok, Thailand	Decision	5	3:00
1992-05-29	Win	(Thailand) Nongmoon Chomphutong	Lumpinee Stadium	Bangkok, Thailand	Decision	5	3:00
1992-	Loss	(Thailand) Panomrunglek Chor.Sawat	Lumpinee Stadium	Bangkok, Thailand	Decision	5	3:00
1992-02-21	Loss	(Thailand) Namkabuan Nongkeepahuyuth	Lumpinee Stadium	Bangkok, Thailand	Decision	5	3:00
For the Lumpinee Stadium Super Featherweight (130 lbs) title.
1992-01-21	Win	(Thailand) Cherry Sor.Wanich	Lumpinee Stadium	Bangkok, Thailand	Decision	5	3:00
1991-11-26	Win	(Netherlands) Ramon Dekkers	Lumpinee Stadium	Bangkok, Thailand	Decision (Unanimous)	5	3:00
1991-08-24	Loss	(Thailand) Samransak Muangsurin	Lumpinee Stadium	Bangkok, Thailand	KO (Punches)	2	
1991-10-05	Loss	(Thailand) Nongmoon Chomphutong	Lumpinee Stadium	Bangkok, Thailand	Decision	5	3:00
1991-	Win	(Thailand) Coban Lookchaomaesaitong	Lumpinee Stadium	Bangkok, Thailand	Decision	5	3:00
1991-06-27	Loss	(Thailand) Sanit Wichitkriengkrai	Lumpinee Stadium	Bangkok, Thailand	Decision	5	3:00
1991-05-29	Win	(Thailand) Nongmoon Chomphutong	Lumpinee Stadium	Bangkok, Thailand	Decision	5	3:00
1991-02-12	Win	(Thailand) Sanit Wichitkriengkrai	Lumpinee Stadium	Bangkok, Thailand	Decision	5	3:00
1990-	Loss	(Thailand) Nuathoranee Thongracha	Lumpinee Stadium	Bangkok, Thailand	Decision	5	3:00
1990-09-01	Loss	(Thailand) Kongtoranee Payakaroon	Lumpinee Stadium	Bangkok, Thailand	KO (Low kick + Right Hook)	3	
1990-07-21	Draw	(Thailand) Thanooin Chor.Cheuchat	Lumpinee Stadium	Bangkok, Thailand	Decision	5	3:00
1990-04-30	Loss	(Thailand) Pairot Wor.Walapon	Rajadamnern Stadium	Bangkok, Thailand	Decision	5	3:00
1989-10-06	Win	(Thailand) Mathee Jadeepitak	Lumpinee Stadium	Bangkok, Thailand	Decision (Unanimous)	5	3:00
1989-07-11	Win	(Thailand) Rungrat Srisunchai	Lumpinee Stadium	Bangkok, Thailand	Decision	5	3:00
1989-06-13	Win	(Thailand) Orono Por.MuangUbon	Lumpinee Stadium	Bangkok, Thailand	Decision	5	3:00
1989-05-15	Loss	(Thailand) Orono Por.MuangUbon	Rajadamnern Stadium	Bangkok, Thailand	Decision	5	3:00
1989-02-17	Draw	(Thailand) Playchumphon Sor.Prantalay	Lumpinee Stadium	Bangkok, Thailand	Decision	5	3:00
1988-12-16	Win	(Thailand) Rungritnoi Daorungomnoi	Lumpinee Stadium	Bangkok, Thailand	Decision	5	3:00
1988-11-04	Win	(Thailand) Nungubon Sitlerchai	Lumpinee Stadium	Bangkok, Thailand	Decision	5	3:00
Legend: Win Loss Draw/No contest Notes

== See also ==
- List of K-1 events
- List of male kickboxers
