= Panomrunglek Chor.Sawat =

Thai professional Muay Thai fighter

- Born: Suthin Boonlum; July 5, 1969; Warin Chamrap, Ubon Ratchathani, Thailand
- Died: 2004 (aged 34–35)
- Native name: สุทิน บุญล้ำ
- Other names: Lord Long Knees (ขุนเข่าก้านยาว)
- Height: 175 cm (5 ft 9 in)
- Division: Super Bantamweight; Lightweight
- Style: Muay Thai (Muay Khao)
- Stance: Orthodox
- Team: Sor.Sumalee
- Trainer: Sakul Srisawat

Suthin Boonlum (Thai: สุทิน บุญล้ำ; July 5, 1969 - ???, 2004), known professionally as Panomrunglek Chor.Sawat (Thai: พนมรุ้งเล็ก ช.สวัสดิ์), was a Thai professional Muay Thai fighter. He was a two-time Lumpinee Stadium Lightweight Champion who was famous during the 1980s and 1990s.

== Biography and career ==
Panomrunglek was born Suthin Boonlum in the Warin Chamrap district, Ubon Ratchathani province on July 5, 1969. He started training and competing in Muay Thai from the Sappasitthiprasong camp in his native province. He won the 95 lbs Isan province title against Audulnoi Muangsakon in 1986 at the age of 17, he joined the stable of famous promotor Songchai Rattanasuban shortly after.

In Bangkok Panomrunglek was part of the Sor.Sumalee camp and became one of the most renowned knee fighter of his era. He defeated notable champions of his era such as Pongsiri Por Ruamrudee, Therdkiat Sitthepitak, Ritthichai Lookchaomaesaitong, Samransak Muangsurin, Nuathoranee Thongracha, Petchdam Lukborai, Namphon Nongkeepahuyuth, Sakmongkol Sithchuchok or Sangtiennoi Sor.Rungroj. He also captured the Lumpinee Stadium 135 lbs title twice in 1992 and 1993.

Panomrunglek died in 2004 at the age of 35 from an illness.

== Titles and accomplishments ==
- Lumpinee Stadium
  - 1992 Lumpinee Stadium Lightweight (135 lbs) Champion
  - 1993 Lumpinee Stadium Lightweight (135 lbs) Champion

== Professional boxing record ==
0 fights	0 wins	0 losses

No.	Result	Record	Opponent	Type	Round	Date	Location	Notes
2	Win	2–0	Ballangthong Lukborai	PTS	6	December 2, 1988	Lumpinee Stadium, Bangkok, Thailand	
1	Win	1–0	Chakthep Luknoendindaeng	PTS	6	May 6, 1986	Lumpinee Stadium, Bangkok, Thailand	

== Muay Thai record ==
Muay Thai Record
Date	Result	Opponent	Event	Location	Method	Round	Time
1995-	Loss	(France) Dany Bill	Lumpinee Stadium	Bangkok, Thailand	Decision	5	3:00
1994-	Loss	(Thailand) Sakmongkol Sithchuchok	Lumpinee Stadium	Bangkok, Thailand	Decision	5	3:00
1994-04-	Loss	(Thailand) Orono Por Muang Ubon	Lumpinee Stadium	Bangkok, Thailand	Decision	5	3:00
1994-01-08	Loss	(Thailand) Sakmongkol Sithchuchok	Lumpinee Stadium	Bangkok, Thailand	Decision	5	3:00
Loses the Lumpinee Stadium Lightweight (135 lbs) title.
1993-11-27	Win	(Thailand) Petchdam Sityodtong	Lumpinee Stadium	Bangkok, Thailand	Decision	5	3:00
Wins the Lumpinee Stadium Lightweight (135 lbs) title.
1993-	Loss	(Thailand) Chandet Sor Prantalay	Lumpinee Stadium	Bangkok, Thailand	Decision	5	3:00
1993-08-28	Loss	(Thailand) Jongsanan Fairtex	Lumpinee Stadium	Bangkok, Thailand	Decision	5	3:00
1993-07-30	Loss	(Thailand) Sakmongkol Sithchuchok	Lumpinee Stadium	Bangkok, Thailand	Decision	5	3:00
1993-07-03	Win	(Thailand) Chandet Sor Prantalay	Lumpinee Stadium	Bangkok, Thailand	Decision	5	3:00
?	Loss	(Thailand) Orono Por Muang Ubon	Lumpinee Stadium	Bangkok, Thailand	Decision	5	3:00
1993-04-17	Loss	(Thailand) Chanchai Sor.Tamarangsri	Sanphasitprasong Stadium	Ubon Ratchathani, Thailand	Decision	5	3:00
1993-04-06	Loss	(Thailand) Petchdam Sityodtong	Lumpinee Stadium	Bangkok, Thailand	Decision	5	3:00
Loses the Lumpinee Stadium Lightweight (135 lbs) title.
1992-10-13	Win	(Thailand) Sangtiennoi Sor.Rungroj	Lumpinee Stadium	Bangkok, Thailand	Decision	5	3:00
Wins the vacant Lumpinee Stadium Lightweight (135 lbs) title.
1992-	Win	(Thailand) Sakmongkol Sithchuchok	Lumpinee Stadium	Bangkok, Thailand	Decision	5	3:00
1991-12-28	Loss	(Thailand) Petchdam Lukborai	Lumpinee Stadium	Bangkok, Thailand	Decision	5	3:00
1991-10-15	Loss	(Thailand) Jeerasak Kiatsamarnwit	Lumpinee Stadium	Bangkok, Thailand	Decision	5	3:00
1991-08-06	Draw	(Thailand) Detchsak Sakpradu	Lumpinee Stadium	Bangkok, Thailand	Decision	5	3:00
1991-06-28	Loss	(Thailand) Namphon Nongkeepahuyuth	Lumpinee Stadium	Bangkok, Thailand	Decision	5	3:00
1991-06-01	Loss	(Thailand) Chanchai Sor Tamarangsri		Bangkok, Thailand	Decision	5	3:00
1991-03-29	Loss	(Thailand) Petchdam Lukborai	Lumpinee Stadium	Bangkok, Thailand	Decision	5	3:00
1991-02-15	Loss	(Thailand) Cherry Sor Wanich	Muangchai Kittikasem vs Sot Chitalada	Ayutthaya Province, Thailand	Decision	5	3:00
1991-01-04	Loss	(Thailand) Jaroenthong Kiatbanchong	Lumpinee Stadium	Bangkok, Thailand	Decision	5	3:00
1990-12-04	Win	(Thailand) Petchdam Lukborai	Lumpinee Stadium	Bangkok, Thailand	Decision	5	3:00
1990-11-20	Win	(Thailand) Namphon Nongkeepahuyuth	Lumpinee Stadium	Bangkok, Thailand	TKO (Doctor stoppage)	4	
1990-10-	Win	(Thailand) Boonchai Tor.Thuwanon	Lumpinee Stadium	Bangkok, Thailand	Decision	5	3:00
1990-09-28	Loss	(Thailand) Therdkiat Sitthepitak	Lumpinee Stadium	Bangkok, Thailand	Decision	5	3:00
1990-08-21	Win	(Thailand) Petchdam Lukborai	Lumpinee Stadium	Bangkok, Thailand	Decision	5	3:00
1990-07-	Win	(Thailand) Roj Lukrungsi	Lumpinee Stadium	Bangkok, Thailand	Decision	5	3:00
1990-06-29	Loss	(Thailand) Sanphet Lukrangsi	Lumpinee Stadium	Bangkok, Thailand	Decision	5	3:00
1990-05-	Win	(Thailand) Nuathoranee Thongracha	Lumpinee Stadium	Bangkok, Thailand	Decision	5	3:00
1990-04-	Win	(Thailand) Roj Lukrungsi	Lumpinee Stadium	Bangkok, Thailand	Decision	5	3:00
1990-03-30	Loss	(Thailand) Therdkiat Sitthepitak	Lumpinee Stadium	Bangkok, Thailand	Decision	5	3:00
For the Lumpinee Stadium Super Bantamweight (122 lbs) title.
1990-02-27	Draw	(Thailand) Grandprixnoi Muangchaiyapum	Lumpinee Stadium	Bangkok, Thailand	Decision	5	3:00
1990-02-	Win	(Thailand) Roj Lukrungsi	Lumpinee Stadium	Bangkok, Thailand	Decision	5	3:00
1990-01-15	Draw	(Thailand) Sanphet Lukrangsi	Lumpinee Stadium	Bangkok, Thailand	Decision	5	3:00
1989-12-24	Loss	(Thailand) Sombat Sor.Thanikul	Suranaree Stadium	Nakhon Ratchasima province, Thailand	Decision	5	3:00
1989-12-18	Loss	(Thailand) Chanchai Sor Tamarangsri	Lumpinee Stadium	Bangkok, Thailand	Decision	5	3:00
1989-11-28	Win	(Thailand) Therdkiat Sitthepitak	Lumpinee Stadium	Bangkok, Thailand	Decision	5	3:00
1989-10-20	Win	(Thailand) Samransak Muangsurin	Lumpinee Stadium	Bangkok, Thailand	Decision	5	3:00
1989-09-12	Win	(Thailand) Samingnoi Kiatkamchai	Lumpinee Stadium	Bangkok, Thailand	Decision	5	3:00
1989-08-18	Win	(Thailand) Den Muangsurin	Lumpinee Stadium	Bangkok, Thailand	Decision	5	3:00
1989-06-26	Win	(Thailand) Ritthichai Lookchaomaesaitong	Lumpinee Stadium	Bangkok, Thailand	Decision	5	3:00
1989-05-12	Loss	(Thailand) Khunphon Chor.Rojanachai	Lumpinee Stadium	Bangkok, Thailand	Decision	5	3:00
1989-04-11	Loss	(Thailand) Phanrit Luksrirat		Ubon Ratchathani province, Thailand	Decision	5	3:00
1989-02-14	Win	(Thailand) Thammawit Saksamut	Lumpinee Stadium	Bangkok, Thailand	Decision	5	3:00
1989-01-31	NC	(Thailand) Therdkiat Sitthepitak	Lumpinee Stadium	Bangkok, Thailand	Panomrunglek dismissed	4	
1988-12-16	Loss	(Thailand) Den Muangsurin	Lumpinee Stadium	Bangkok, Thailand	Decision	5	3:00
1988-11-04	Win	(Thailand) Therdkiat Sitthepitak	Lumpinee Stadium	Bangkok, Thailand	Decision	5	3:00
1988-09-27	Loss	(Thailand) Detsak Sakpradu	Lumpinee Stadium	Bangkok, Thailand	Decision	5	3:00
1988-07-26	Win	(Thailand) Khunsueknoi Pairanan	Lumpinee Stadium	Bangkok, Thailand	KO (Knee)	4	
1988-06-28	Win	(Thailand) Wanthongchai Sityodtong	Lumpinee Stadium	Bangkok, Thailand	Decision	5	3:00
1987-12-25	Win	(Thailand) Boonkerd Fairtex	Lumpinee Stadium	Bangkok, Thailand	Decision	5	3:00
1987-06-30	Loss	(Thailand) Kompayak Singmanee	Chaomangkon, Lumpinee Stadium	Bangkok, Thailand	Decision	5	3:00
1987-04-26	Win	(Thailand) Chamnandej Chor Khaenthong	Lumpinee Stadium	Bangkok, Thailand	Decision	5	3:00
1987-03-06	Win	(Thailand) Pongsiri Por Ruamrudee	Lumpinee Stadium	Bangkok, Thailand	Decision	5	3:00
1986-12-19	Loss	(Thailand) Karuhat Sor.Supawan	Huamark Stadium	Bangkok, Thailand	Decision	5	3:00
1986-11-25	Loss	(Thailand) Hippy Singmanee	Lumpinee Stadium	Bangkok, Thailand	Decision	5	3:00
1986-09-30	Loss	(Thailand) Pacharin Sripatcharin	Lumpinee Stadium	Bangkok, Thailand	Decision	5	3:00
1986-09-06	Win	(Thailand) Audulnoi Muangsakon	Sappasithiprasong Stadium	Ubon Ratchathani province, Thailand	KO	3	
Wins the Isan province 95 lbs title.
1986-05-06	Win	(Thailand) Chakthep Luknuendindaeng	Lumpinee Stadium	Bangkok, Thailand	Decision	5	3:00
1986-	Win	(Thailand) Saengdaonoi Silachai	Lumpinee Stadium	Bangkok, Thailand	Decision	5	3:00
1986-	Win	(Thailand) Saengdaonoi Silachai	Lumpinee Stadium	Bangkok, Thailand	Decision	5	3:00
1986-	Win	(Thailand) Kangwannoi Lukbuayai		Thailand	KO		
Legend: Win Loss Draw/No contest Notes
