= Jo Prestia =

French Muay Thai kickboxer and actor

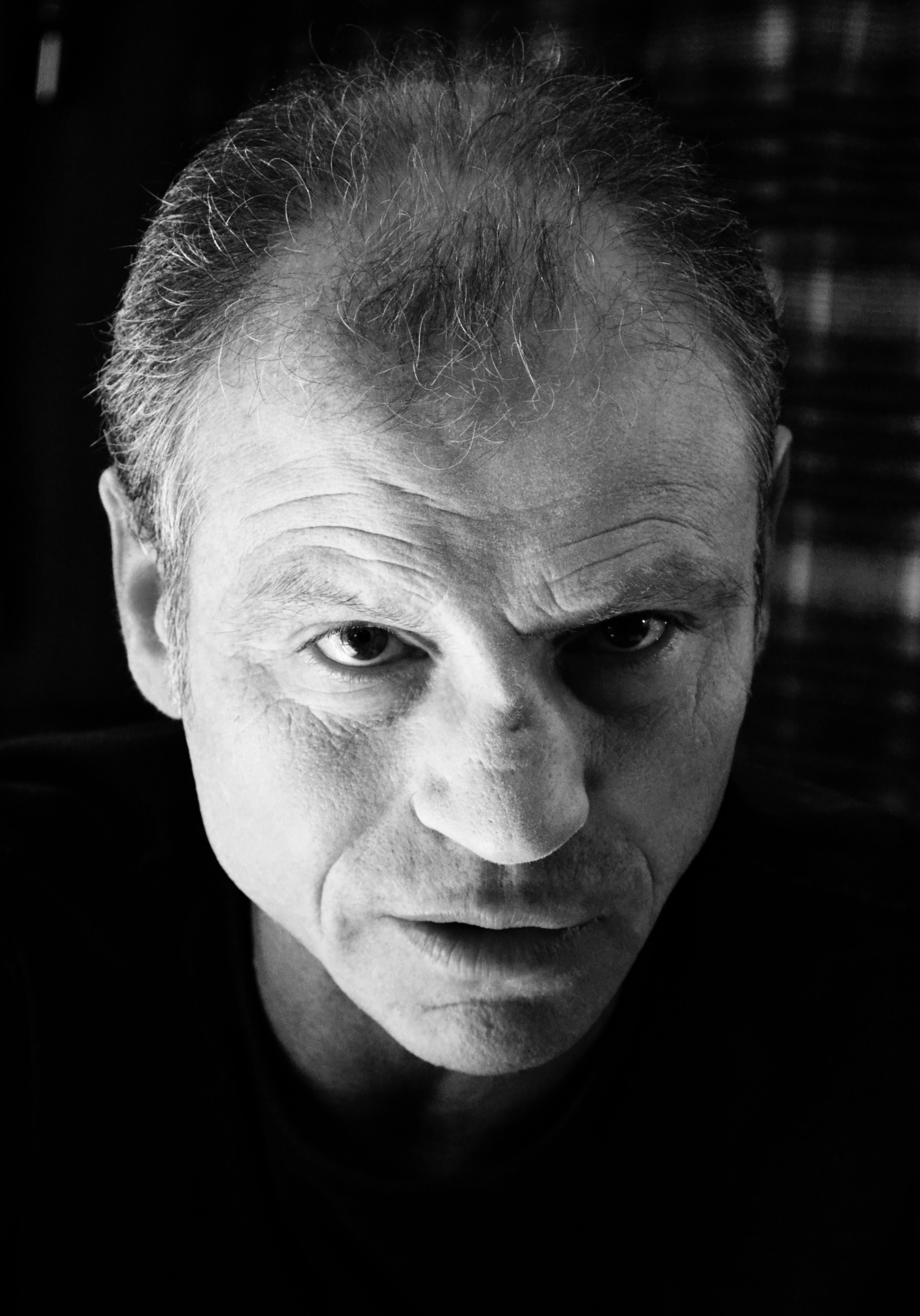
- Born: 5 June 1960 (age 66); Porto Empedocle, Sicily, Italy
- Nationality: Italy / France
- Height: 1.70 m (5 ft 7 in)
- Weight: 67 kg (148 lb; 10.6 st)
- Division: Welterweight
- Style: Muay Thai
- Stance: Orthodox
- Fighting out of: France

Kickboxing record
- Total: 85
- Wins: 70
- By knockout: 30
- Losses: 15

Other information
- Occupation: Actor
- Last updated on: 2 January 2025

Jo Prestia (born 5 June 1960) is an Italian born French Muay Thai kickboxer and actor. He has appeared in more than 70 films since 1996 and is best known for his performance as Le Tenia in the controversial 2002 film, Irréversible. In Muay Thai, he is considered to be one of the best farangs of the 90s era.

== Muay Thai kickboxing career ==
=== Early career ===
In his early career, Prestia's notable bouts was against Payakdam, Ronnie Green in 1984 losing both fights by a 5-round decision. In 1985 Jo defeated Bruno Benlabed by a 5-round decision.

=== French Muay Thai title ===
In 1985 Jo fought for the French Muay Thai Title defeating Mohamed Jami by a 5-round decision.

=== European Muay Thai world title ===
In 1986 and 1987 Jo would accomplish three European Muay Thai Championships. On 14 May 1988 a rematch was set against Bruno Benlabed for the Muay Thai European Championship, Jo would lose a 5-round decision.

=== Rivalry with Wattana Soudareth ===
From 1987 to 1988 Jo fought Wattana Soudareth thrice losing the first fight by a 5-round decision, in a rematch Jo secured a win by a 5-round decision, and in the trilogy would go on to lose a 5-round decision.

=== First knockout loss ===
In 1988 he competed against Kitty Sor.Thanikul losing by technical knockout in the 4th round corner stoppage.

=== Rivalry with Lamkhong Sitwaywat ===
Jo competed against Lamkhong Sitwaywat twice losing both fights by a 5-round decision.

=== 2 on 1 ===
On 21 December 1989 Jo competed in a 2 on 1 event alongside Joel Cesar against Cherry Sor Wanich, Prestia fought the first three rounds and Joel Cesar the last two. Cherry won the bout by a 5-round decision.

=== Notable wins before title shot ===
On 23 November 1990 Jo competed against Joel Cesar winning by a 5-round decision. In December 1990, Jo fought Sannarong Kiathoranee winning by a 4th-round KO.

=== Muay Thai world title ===
Jo would compete for the Muay Thai Welterweight World Title against Somsong Kiathoranee, winning by a 4th-round knockout and became the first Frenchman in history to win a Muay Thai world championship title. On 16 February 1991 Jo rematched Samsong losing the title by a 5th-round technical knockout( leg kicks).

On 20 June 1992 Jo competed against Ramon Dekkers having previously lost by decision, a rematch was set for the Welterweight Muay Thai World Title, Jo would win by a 5-round decision. On 3 October 1992 Jo would lose the title to Coban Lookchaomaesaitong by a 5-round decision.

=== Second run for the Muay Thai world title ===
In 1992 Jo defeated Samaisuk Chuwattana by a 5-round decision. In 1993 Jo defeated J.V Eguzkiza in a 9-round decision to win the kickboxing world title (savate style). In 1995 he fought and defeated Aymah Lukbanmao by a 5th-round knockout.

=== Muay Thai world title ===
On 17 November 1995 Jo would face Dany Bill in the event La Nuit des Champion, for the Muay Thai World Title, losing by a 5-round decision.

=== Last fight ===
His last fight took place in 1996 against Saimai Chor Suananan, losing a 5-round decision. He would retire with a record of 70 wins, 30 by a way of knockout, 15 losses.

== Selected filmography ==
- 1998: The Dreamlife of Angels as Fredo
- 2002: Irréversible
- 2004: 36 Quai des Orfèvres
- 2005: I Saw Ben Barka Get Killed
- 2005: 13 Tzameti
- 2007: Ill Wind
- 2008: Rivoallan (short) as Rivoallan
- 2009: The Horde as José
- 2014: Colt 45 as Marco
- 2017: Alibi.com as Prosper
