= Dida Diafat =

Algerian-French Muay Thai kickboxer

- Born: Dida Diafat; 24 April 1970 (age 56); Bab El Oued, Algiers, Algeria
- Nationality: French; Algerian
- Height: 1.73 m (5 ft 8 in)
- Weight: 63–67 kg (139–148 lb; 9 st 13 lb – 10 st 8 lb)
- Style: Muay Thai
- Years active: 1988–1998

Kickboxing record
- Total: 87
- Wins: 76
- Losses: 10
- Draws: 1

Dida Diafat (born 24 April 1970) is an Algerian-French Muay Thai kickboxer who became a world champion in Thai kickboxing or Muay Thai at age 21. A fictionalised version of his life is depicted in the 2005 movie Chok-Dee, in which he plays himself.

== Biography ==
At the age of 18, Dida Diafat left the town of Villiers le Bel (Val d'Oise) to join the Muay Thai training camps of Thailand. Three years later, he became the first Algerian and Frenchman to be a Muay Thai world champion. He became the first Thai kickboxing fighter to win a contract with a French television channel - specifically, Canal+ in 1994. Following the release of Chok Dee he retired from kickboxing and decided to pursue a career in acting and in the clothing business. He had a role in the 2009 horror film Mutants.

== Titles and achievements ==
=== Titles ===
- 1991-1998 Competed in 16 World Championships in Muaythai, Kickboxing and won 11 titles
- 1993 World Muaythai Champion in Paris
- 1992 World Kickboxing Champion in Levallois
- 1991 World Muaythai Champion in Paris Bercy
- 1991 World Muaythai Champion (-63 kg)
- 1989 French Muaythai Champion Class A

== Awards ==
- 1997 "Songh Shaï" vase
- 1995 Best Foot & Fist Fighter of the Year
- 1994 Best Foot & Fist Fighter of the Year
- 1993 Best Foot & Fist Fighter of the Year
- 2015 Hall of Fame WKL World Kickboxing League

== Fight record ==
Professional kickboxing record
87 fights, 76 wins, 10 losses, 1 draw
Date	Result	Opponent	Event	Location	Method	Round	Time
1996-06-01	Loss	(Canada) Peter Cunningham		Paris, France	Decision	12	2:00
For the ISKA Oriental rules World Light-welterweight (-64.5kg) title.
?	Loss	(Thailand) Tanongsuk Sor.Prantalay	ISKA Lumpinee Stadium	Bangkok, Thailand	Decision	5	3:00
1995-	Loss	(Thailand) Saimai Chor Suananan	World Muaythai Championship	France	Decision	5	3:00
For World Muay Thai title.
1994-11-12	Loss	(Thailand) Saimai Chor Suananan	World Muaythai Championship	Marseilles, France	Decision	5	3:00
Lost his World Muay Thai title.
1994-06-	Win	(United States) David Cummings		Levallois-Perret, France	KO	1	
Defends ISKA Oriental rules Light Welterweight World title.
1994-	Win	(Belgium) Noël Van Den Heuvel	ISKA Kikcboxing	Paris, France	KO (punches)	5	
Wins ISKA Oriental rules Light Welterweight World title.
1994-02-05	Win	(Netherlands) Ramon Dekkers	Muay Thai Gala in Bercy	Paris, France	Decision (unanimous)	5	3:00
Defends Muay Thai World title.
1993-	Loss	(Belgium) Noël Van Den Heuvel	World Championship	Marbella, Spain	TKO (referee stoppage)	7	
Loses the ISKA Oriental rules Light Welterweight World title.
1993-06-	Win	(Thailand) Muangphet	Muay Thai Gala in Stade Pierre de Coubertin	Paris, France	Decision	5	3:00
Wins the ISKA Oriental rules Light Welterweight World title.
1993-03-26	Win	(Netherlands) Ramon Dekkers	Muay Thai Gala in Paris	Paris, France	TKO (doctor stoppage/cut)	3	
Wins Muay Thai World title.
1993-02-14	Loss	(Thailand) Coban Lookchaomaesaitong	Thai Boxing World Championship	Brest, France	Decision (unanimous)	5	3:00
1992-11-21	Draw	(Canada) Peter Cunningham		Paris, France	Decision draw	12	2:00
For the ISKA Oriental rules and WKA World Light-welterweight title.
1992	Win	(Belarus) Vadim Chemiakin	Gala in Palais des sports	Levallois, France	TKO (retirement)	6	
Wins Kickboxing World title.
1992-02-28	Loss	(Thailand) Chandet Sor Prantalay	Crocodile Farm	Samut Prakan, Thailand	Decision	5	3:00
1991-12-20	Win	(Thailand) Daris Sor Thanikul	Gala in Palais des sports de Bercy	Paris, France	Decision	5	3:00
Retains Muay Thai World title.
1991-10-25	Loss	(Netherlands) Stewart Ballantine		France	KO (left hooks)	5	
1991-	Win	(Thailand) Chumpong		France	TKO (doctor stoppage)		
1991-06-	Win	(Thailand) Sorn Areen	Gala in Palais des sports	Nanterre, France	KO (punches)	4	
Wins World Muay Thai title (-63 kg).
1991	Loss	(Thailand) Coban Lookchaomaesaitong	World Muaythai Championship		Decision (unanimous)	5	3:00
Fight was for World Muay Thai title.
1990-12-02	Loss	(Thailand) Kongtoranee Payakaroon		England	Decision	5	3:00
For WMTC World 140 lbs title.
1990	Loss	(France) Fabrice Payen	European Muaythai Championship		Decision	5	3:00
Fight was for European Muay Thai title.
1990	Loss	(Thailand) Daris Sor Thanikul	Muaythai Gala in Lyon	Lyon, France			
1989	Win	(France)	French Championship Class A, Final	France	KO	4	
Wins French Muay Thai Championship 1989 Class A title.
1989	Win	(France)	French Championship Class A, Semi Final	France			
1989	Win	(France)	French Championship Class A, Quarter Final	France			
1988	Loss	(France)		Stains, France	KO		
1988-06-18	Win	(France) Jean Benlabed	French Thai	France	Decision	5	3:00
1988-04-27	Win	(United Kingdom) James Wick	French Thai	France	Decision	5	3:00
1988-02-12	Win	(France) Cyril Jami	French Thai	France	Decision	5	3:00
1988-01-13	Win	(France) Jean Benlabed	French Thai	France	Decision	5	3:00
Legend: Win Loss Draw/no contest Notes

== See also ==
- List of male kickboxers
