= Hiroki Shishido =

Japanese kickboxer (born 1977)

- Born: March 16, 1977 (age 49); Fukushima, Japan
- Native name: 宍戸大樹
- Nationality: (Japan) Japanese
- Height: 1.74 m (5 ft 9 in)
- Weight: 69.3 kg (153 lb; 10.91 st)
- Division: Welterweight
- Style: Shoot boxing
- Fighting out of: Asakusa, Japan
- Team: Cesar Gym
- Years active: 1998–present

Kickboxing record
- Total: 89
- Wins: 62
- By knockout: 26
- Losses: 27
- By knockout: 6
- Last updated on: November 15, 2013

Hiroki Shishido (Japanese: 宍戸大樹; born March 16, 1977) is a Japanese welterweight shoot boxer, fighting out of Cesar Gym, Asakusa. He is a former 2004 S-cup world tournament finalist and WMC Intercontinental Super Welterweight champion.

== Biography ==
He defeated Satoru Suzuki via KO (spinning back fist) in the first round at Shootboxing 2012 - Act 4 on September 17, 2012 in Tokyo, Japan to qualify for the 2012 S-Cup.

He competed at the Shoot Boxing World Tournament 2012 in Tokyo, Japan on November 17, 2012. After a majority decision (27-27, 28-27, 28-27) win over Gesias Cavalcante at the quarter-final stage, he was knocked out by the eventual tournament winner Andy Souwer in the first round of their semi-finals bout.

He defeated Hiroyuki Takaya by unanimous decision at Shootboxing 2013 - Act 2 in Tokyo on April 20, 2013. He scored two knockdowns in the first round but was also deducted a point in the third when he kicked a downed Takaya.

He defeated Len Genji by unanimous decision at Shoot Boxing 2013 - Act 4 on June 23, 2013.

Shishido knocked out Moody Rawai in round two to retain his Shootboxing Asia-Pacific title on August 20, 2013 at Shoot Boxing in Fukushima 2013.

He lost to Yuichiro Nagashima by unanimous decision at Shoot Boxing Battle Summit Ground Zero Tokyo 2013 in Tokyo, Japan on November 15, 2013.

== Titles and accomplishments ==
=== Amateur ===
- All Japan Amateur Shoot boxing championship winner

=== Professional ===
- SHOOT BOXING
  - 2001 Shoot Boxing Japan Super lightweight (Seagullweight) Champion
  - 2005 Shoot Boxing Japan Welterweight Champion (defended once)
  - 2009 Shoot Boxing Oriental and Pacific Welterweight Champion (defended twice)
  - 2004 Shoot Boxing S-cup World tournament runner-up
- World Muay Thai Council
  - 2002 WMC Intercontinental Super welterweight Champion

== Kickboxing Record ==
Kickboxing Record
62 Wins (26 (T)KO's), 27 Losses
Date	Result	Opponent	Event	Location	Method	Round	Time
2019-06-02	Loss	(Japan) Taisei	SHOOT BOXING Hana Yashiki Extreme.1	Tokyo, Japan	TKO	2	1:50
2019-02-11	Win	(Japan) Atsushi Sasatani	Shoot Boxing 2019 act.1	Tokyo, Japan	Decision	3	3:00
2018-11-18	Loss	(Japan) Kentaro Hokuto	SHOOT BOXING S-Cup 65 kg World Tournament 2018	Tokyo, Japan	Decision	3	3:00
2018-08-18	Loss	(Japan) Tsukuru Midorikawa	KNOCK OUT SUMMER FES.2018	Tokyo, Japan	TKO (Doctor Stoppage)	2	1:26
2018-06-10	Win	(Japan) Taiki Tsuchiya	SHOOT BOXING 2018 act.3	Tokyo, Japan	KO	3	1:08
2018-04-01	Win	(Hong Kong) Bernard Fung	SHOOT BOXING 2018 act.2	Tokyo, Japan	Decision	3	3:00
2016-04-03	Loss	(Thailand) Jaoweha Sirilakgym	SHOOT BOXING 2016 act.2	Tokyo, Japan	TKO	3	1:14
2015-12-01	Loss	(Japan) Hiroto Uesako	SHOOT BOXING 30th ANNIVERSARY “GROUND ZERO TOKYO 2015	Tokyo, Japan	Decision	3	3:00
2015-09-19	Win	(Thailand) Jaoweha Grandthaiboxing	SHOOT BOXING 2015～SB30th Anniversary～ act.4	Tokyo, Japan	Extra Round Decision	6	3:00
Retains Shoot boxing Oriental and Pacific welterweight champion -67 kg.
2015-02-21	Win	(Japan) Koji Yoshimoto	SHOOT BOXING 30th ANNIVERSARY“CAESAR TIME!”	Tokyo, Japan	TKO	5	1:41
2015-02-21	Loss	(Netherlands) Zakaria Zouggary	SHOOT BOXING 2015～SB30th Anniversary～ act.1	Tokyo, Japan	Decision (Unanimous)	3	3:00
2014-11-30	Loss	(France) Houcine Bennoui	SHOOT BOXING S-cup World Tournament 2014, Quarter Finals	Tokyo, Japan	Decision (Unanimous)	3	3:00
2013-11-15	Loss	(Japan) Yuichiro Nagashima	Shoot Boxing Battle Summit Ground Zero Tokyo 2013	Tokyo, Japan	Decision (Unanimous)	3	3:00
2013-08-10	Win	(Australia) Moody Rawai	Shoot Boxing in Fukusima 2013	Fukushima, Japan	KO (spinning back kick)	2	2:03
Retains Shoot boxing Oriental and Pacific welterweight champion -67 kg.
2013-06-23	Win	(Japan) Len Genji	Shootboxing 2013 - Act 4	Tokyo, Japan	Decision (unanimous)	3	3:00
2013-04-20	Win	(Japan) Hiroyuki Takaya	Shootboxing 2013 - Act 2	Tokyo, Japan	Decision (unanimous)	3	3:00
2012-11-17	Loss	(Netherlands) Andy Souwer	Shoot Boxing World Tournament 2012, Semi Finals	Tokyo, Japan	TKO (punches)	1	2:00
2012-11-17	Win	(Brazil) Gesias Cavalcante	Shoot Boxing World Tournament 2012, Quarter Finals	Tokyo, Japan	Decision (majority)	3	3:00
2012-09-17	Win	(Japan) Satoru Suzuki	Shootboxing 2012 - Act 4	Tokyo, Japan	KO (spinning back fist)	1	1:03
2012-06-03	Loss	(Japan) Hiroaki Suzuki	SHOOT BOXING 2012 ～Road to S-cup～ act.3	Tokyo, Japan	Decision (Unanimous)	5	3:00
2012-02-06	Loss	(South Africa) Warren Stevelmans	Shootboxing 2012 - Act 1	Tokyo, Japan	Decision (Unanimous)	5	3:00
2011-11-06	Loss	(Japan) Takeshi Inoue	Shoot the Shooto 2011	Tokyo, Japan	Decision (Majority)	3	3:00
2011-06-05	Loss	(United States) Toby Imada	Shootboxing 2011 - Act 3	Tokyo, Japan	Decision (Unanimous)	3	3:00
2011-02-19	Win	(Thailand) Bovy Sor Udomson	Shootboxing 2011 - Act 1	Tokyo, Japan	Decision (Unanimous)	5	3:00
2010-11-23	Loss	(Thailand) Buakaw Por. Pramuk	S-Cup 2010, Quarter Finals	Tokyo, Japan	Decision (Unanimous)	3	3:00
2010-09-18	Loss	(Netherlands) Miloud El Geubli	Shoot Boxing 25th Anniversary - Ishin 4th Battle	Tokyo, Japan	Ext.R Decision (Majority)	6	3:00
2010-06-06	Win	(South Africa) Virgil Kalakoda	Shoot Boxing 25th Anniversary - Ishin 3rd Battle	Tokyo, Japan	KO (Straight Left)	3	2:15
2010-04-11	Win	(Japan) Satoshi Suzuki	Shoot Boxing 25th Anniversary - Ishin 2nd Battle	Tokyo, Japan	TKO (Standing Guillotine Choke)	2	1:39
2010-02-13	Win	(Australia) Greg Foley	Shoot Boxing 25th Anniversary - Ishin 1st Battle	Tokyo, Japan	KO (Standing Guillotine Choke)	5	1:24
2009-09-04	Loss	(Thailand) Bovy Sor Udomson	Shoot Boxing 2009 - Bushido 4th	Tokyo, Japan	KO (Right Hook)	5	0:34
2009-06-01	Win	(Australia) Luke Maitland	Shoot Boxing 2009 - Bushido 3rd	Tokyo, Japan	KO (Standing Guillotine Choke)	2	1:15
Wins inaugural Shoot boxing Oriental and Pacific welterweight champion -67 kg.
2009-04-03	Win	(Brazil) Luis Azeredo	Shoot Boxing 2009 - Bushido 2nd	Tokyo, Japan	Ext.R Decision (Unanimous)	4	3:00
2009-02-11	Win	(China) Wei Shoulei	Shoot Boxing 2009 - Bushido 1st	Tokyo, Japan	KO (Knee)	3	1:54
2008-11-24	Loss	(Netherlands) Andy Souwer	2008 Shoot Boxing S-Cup World Tournament, Semi Finals	Saitama, Japan	Decision (Unanimous)	3	3:00
2008-11-24	Win	(Poland) Chris Horodecki	2008 Shoot Boxing S-Cup World Tournament, Quarter Finals	Saitama, Japan	Decision (Unanimous)	3	3:00
2008-09-12	Win	(Japan) Kenji Kanai	Shoot Boxing 2008 Tamashi - Road to S-cup - 5th	Tokyo, Japan	Decision (Unanimous)	5	3:00
2008-07-21	Win	(Japan) Hitoshi Yamaguchi	Shoot Boxing 2008 Tamashi - Road to S-Cup - 4th	Tokyo, Japan	Decision (Unanimous)	5	3:00
Retains Shoot boxing Welterweight (-67.5kg) title.
2008-05-28	Win	(Canada) Antonio Carvalho	Shoot Boxing 2008 Tamashi - Road to S-Cup - 3rd	Tokyo, Japan	Ext.R Decision (Unanimous)	4	3:00
2008-04-04	Win	(Hong Kong) Tsang Hoi Kwan	Shoot Boxing 2008 Tamashi - Road to S-Cup - 2nd	Tokyo, Japan	Ext.R Decision (Unanimous)	4	3:00
2007-11-24	Loss	(Netherlands) Peter Hoes	Shootboxing in the Autotron	Rosmalen, Netherlands	TKO (Shoulder Injury)	1	
2007-10-28	Win	(Thailand) Big Ben Chor Praram 6	Shootboxing Battle Summit Ground Zero	Tokyo, Japan	Decision (Unanimous)	3	3:00
2007-09-30	Win	(Japan) Tatsuji	WSBA "Shoot Boxing 20th Anniversary Series 4th"	Tokyo, Japan	Decision (Unanimous)	3	3:00
2007-06-10	Loss	(Japan) Yasuhiro Kido	MAJKF "Breakdown 5"	Tokyo, Japan	Decision (Unanimous)	5	3:00
2007-02-05	Loss	(Japan) Keiji Ozaki	K-1 MAX Japan 2007, Quarter Finals	Tokyo, Japan	Decision (Unanimous)	3	3:00
2006-12-03	Win	(United States) Damacio Page	WSBA "Shoot Boxing 2006 Neo ΟΡΘΡΟΣ Series Final"	Tokyo, Japan	KO (Flying Left Knee)	2	2:02
2006-11-03	Loss	(Japan) Kenichi Ogata	2006 Shoot Boxing S-Cup World Tournament, Semi Finals	Tokyo, Japan	Decision (Unanimous)	3	3:00
2006-11-03	Win	(New Zealand) Jordan Tai	2006 Shoot Boxing S-Cup World Tournament, Quarter Finals	Tokyo, Japan	Ext.R Decision (Unanimous)	3	3:00
2006-09-04	Loss	(Thailand) Buakaw Por. Pramuk	K-1 World MAX 2006 Champions Challenge	Tokyo, Japan	KO (Left Hook)	1	0:15
2006-05-26	Win	(Australia) Ian Schaffa	WSBA "Shoot Boxing 2006 Neo ΟΡΘΡΟΣ Series 3rd"	Tokyo, Japan	Decision (Unanimous)	5	3:00
2006-03-25	Win	(Brazil) Marfio Canoletti	WSBA "Shoot Boxing 2006 Neo ΟΡΘΡΟΣ Series 2nd"	Saitama, Japan	Decision (Unanimous)	5	3:00
2006-02-09	Win	(Brazil) Andre "Dida" Amade	WSBA "Shoot Boxing 2006 Neo ΟΡΘΡΟΣ Series 1st"	Tokyo, Japan	Decision (Unanimous)	5	3:00
2005-11-25	Win	(Mongolia) Padammgalaf Barjinnikam	WSBA "Shoot Boxing 20th Anniversary Series Final"	Tokyo, Japan	TKO (Corner Stoppage)	3	1:06
2005-06-26	Win	(Japan) Takashi Ohno	WSBA "Shoot Boxing 20th Anniversary Series 3rd"	Tokyo, Japan	Decision (Unanimous)	5	3:00
2005-03-06	Win	(Japan) Koichi Kikuchi	WSBA "Shoot Boxing 20th Anniversary Series 1st"	Tokyo, Japan	Decision (Unanimous)	5	3:00
Wins inaugural Shoot Boxing Welterweight (-67.5kg) title.
2005-01-23	Win	(Denmark) Ole Laursen	Shoot Boxing Ground Zero	Tokyo, Japan	KO (Right High Kick)	3	0:22
2004-11-05	Win	(Thailand) Changpuek Sorseprasert	Shoot boxing: Infinity-S Vol.5	Japan	TKO (Corner Stop/Punches)	4	2:14
2004-09-19	Loss	(Netherlands) Andy Souwer	S-Cup 2004, Final	Yokohama, Japan	TKO (Ref Stop)	2	0:50
Fight was for S-Cup 2004 tournament title -70 kg.
2004-09-19	Win	(Brazil) Katel Kubis	S-Cup 2004, Semi Finals	Yokohama, Japan	Decision (Unanimous)	3	3:00
2004-09-19	Win	(Australia) Bruce Macfie	S-Cup 2004, Reserve Fight	Yokohama, Japan	Decision (Unanimous)	3	3:00
2004-07-19	Win	(Japan) Takahiro Sasara	Shoot boxing: Infinity-S Vol.4	Sendai, Japan	TKO (Doc Stop/Fracture)	1	1:11
2004-05-09	Win	(Japan) Yasuhito Shirasu	MAJKF "Supreme 3 - Battlefield Tiger"	Japan	TKO (Doc Stop/Cut)	4	2:30
2004-01-24	Win	(Japan) Yuki	Ikusa "Future Fighter Ikusa 5 -Ran- Monkey Magic"	Tokyo, Japan	Decision (Unanimous)	3	3:00
2003-12-16	Loss	(Australia) Kurt Finlayson	X-Plosion V	Gold Coast, Australia	Decision (Split)	5	3:00
2003-10-25	Loss	(China) Liu Xianwei	Kung Fu vs Shoot Boxing	China	Decision	5	2:00
2003-09-23	Win	(Morocco) Tarik El Idrissie	WSBA "S" of the World Vol.5"	Tokyo, Japan	Decision (Unanimous)	5	3:00
2003-06-01	Win	(Japan) Masaaki Kato	WSBA "S" of the World Vol.3"	Tokyo, Japan	2nd Ext.R Decision (Split)	7	3:00
Retains Shoot boxing Super Lightweight (-65kg) title.
2003-04-13	Loss	(Thailand) Tewaritnoi S.K.V. Gym	WSBA "S" of the World Vol.2"	Tokyo, Japan	Decision (Majority)	5	3:00
2002-12-15	Win	(Australia) Brad Hull	X-Plosion Boonchu S-Cup	Gold Coast, Australia	Decision	5	3:00
2002-09-22	Win	(France) Tarik Benfkih	WSBA "The Age of "S" Vol.4"	Japan	Decision (Unanimous)	5	3:00
2002-07-28	Win	(Australia) Shannon Forrester	Boonchu Show	Gold Coast, Australia	Decision (Unanimous)	5	3:00
Wins W.M.C. super welterweight Intercontinental title -70 kg.
2002-07-07	Win	(Netherlands) Ronald Wolfs	S-Cup 2002, Super Fight	Yokohama, Japan	TKO (Ref Stop/3 Knockdowns)	2	1:07
2002-04-28	Win	(Australia) Shannon Forrester	MAJKF "In Search for the Strongest - Showdown Kickoff"	Japan	TKO (Doc Stop/Cut)	4	2:10
2002-03-31	Win	(Japan) Kotani Naoyuki	WSBA "The Age of "S" Vol.2"	Tokyo, Japan	KO (Straight Right)	2	2:40
2002-02-01	Win	(United States) Jason Brace	WSBA "The Age of "S" Vol.1"	Tokyo, Japan	TKO (Doc Stop/Knee Injury)	1	3:00
2001-11-30	Win	(Japan) Keichi Samukawa	SHOOTBOXING "INVADE 5th Stage"	Tokyo, Japan	KO	2	
2001-11-20	Win	(Australia) Shannon Forrester	WSBA "Be a Champ 4th Stage"	Tokyo, Japan	TKO (Doc Stop/Cut)	2	0:39
2001-09-25	Win	(Japan) Sakaguchi Ki	WSBA "Be a Champ 3rd Stage"	Tokyo, Japan	Decision (Unanimous)	3	3:00
Wins inaugural J.S.B.A. Shoot boxing super lightweight title -65 kg.
2001-04-30	Win	(Japan) Kojiro Ganryu	SHOOT BOXING "Be a Champ 2nd Stage"	Tokyo, Japan	TKO	3	
2001-01-13	Win	(Korea)			KO	2	
2000-03-24	Win	(Japan) Kiyohiro		Tokyo, Japan	Decision	3	3:00
2000-03-24	Win	(Japan) Kazuya Fujioka		Tokyo, Japan	TKO	2	
2000-01-24	Win	(Japan) Kitaoka	SHOOTBOXING INVADE	Tokyo, Japan	Decision	3	3:00
1999-12-01	Win	(Japan) Taison Togane	SHOOTBOXING AGAINST 1999 4th	Tokyo, Japan	Decision	3	3:00
1998-08-28	Win	(Japan) ZAI	Shoot Boxing Michi he no Chousen Part 5	Tokyo, Japan	Decision	2	3:00
1998-08-28	Loss	(Japan) Hideki Boku	K-1 Japan Grand Prix '98, Opening Fight	Tokyo, Japan	Decision (Unanimous)	3	3:00
1998-06-04	Win	(Japan) Hideki Hyodo	SHOOTBOXING S・K－XX 2nd	Tokyo, Japan	KO	2	
Legend: Win Loss Draw/No contest Notes

== See also ==
- List of male kickboxers
- List of K-1 Events
