= Kriangkrai Noikoed =

Thai former professional Muay Thai fighter and taekwondo practitioner

- Born: Kriangkrai Noikoed; 6 October 1975 (age 51); Bangkok, Thailand
- Height: 1.76 m (5 ft 9 1/2 in)
- Division: Welterweight; Super Welterweight; Middleweight
- Style: Muay Thai; Taekwondo
- Trainer: Chang Dae-Soon; Wirat Phimthon

Kriangkrai Noikoed (Thai: เกรียงไกร น้อยเกิด; born October 6, 1975, in Bangkok), known professionally as Kriangkrai Sor.Worapin (Thai: เกรียงไกร ส.วรพิน), is a Thai former professional Muay Thai fighter and taekwondo practitioner. He is a former Lumpinee Stadium and Rajadamnern Stadium champion at Welterweight who was famous in the 1990s and 2000s.

== Biography and career ==
He claimed a bronze medal in the 70-kg division at the 1998 Asian Games in his native Bangkok, retrieved three men's welterweight titles at the Southeast Asian Games (1999, 2001, and 2003), and later represented his nation Thailand at the 2004 Summer Olympics.

Noikoed qualified for the Thai squad in the men's welterweight class (80 kg) at the 2004 Summer Olympics in Athens, by defeating Filipino taekwondo player Donald Geisler for the top spot and securing a berth from the Asian Olympic Qualifying Tournament in his native Bangkok. He crashed out early in a cautious 12–16 defeat to Iranian fighter and eventual bronze medalist Yousef Karami during his opening round match. When Karami lost the semifinal to U.S. taekwondo player and 2000 Olympic champion Steven López, Noikoed denied his chance to proceed into the repechage for the Olympic bronze medal.

== Titles and accomplishments ==
- Rajadamnern Stadium
  - 1996 Rajadamnern Stadium Welterweight (147 lbs) Champion
    - One successful title defense
- Lumpinee Stadium
  - 1997 Lumpinee Stadium Welterweight (147 lbs) Champion

== Fight record ==
Muay Thai Record
Date	Result	Opponent	Event	Location	Method	Round	Time
2000-05-20	Loss	(France) Dany Bill	France Thaïlande	France	TKO (Low kicks)	2	
1999-03-06	Win	(Thailand) Sakmongkol Sithchuchok	Lumpinee Stadium	Bangkok, Thailand	Decision	5	3:00
Retains the Lumpinee Stadium Welterweight (147 lbs) title. The referee judged that Sakmongkol wasn't fighting up to his abilities.
1998-11-21	Loss	(France) Stéphane Nikiéma	Muaythai Gala in Marseilles	Marseilles, France	KO		
1998	Win	(France) Stéphane Nikiéma	Muaythai Gala in Paris	Paris, France	TKO (Elbow/Cut)	5	3:00
1998-06-04	Win	(Thailand) Fanakhon Sakdecha	Rangsit Stadium	Rangsit, Thailand	Decision	5	3:00
1997-11-11	Win	(Thailand) Sakmongkol Sithchuchok	Lumpinee Stadium	Bangkok, Thailand	Decision	5	3:00
Wins the Lumpinee Stadium Welterweight (147 lbs) title.
1997-06-14	Win	(Thailand) Sangtiennoi Sor.Rungroj	Lumpinee Stadium	Bangkok, Thailand	Decision	5	3:00
1997-	Draw	(France) Stéphane Nikiéma			Decision	5	3:00
1997-02-22	Loss	(Thailand) Keng Singnakonkhui	GS Power Giant Tournament, Final - Lumpinee Stadium	Bangkok, Thailand	KO (Elbow)	3	
For the GS Tournament title.
1997-01-04	Win	(Thailand) Kaoponglek Luksuratham	GS Power Giant Tournament, Semi Final - Lumpinee Stadium	Bangkok, Thailand	Decision	5	3:00
1996-	Win	(France) Stéphane Nikiéma					
1996-	Win	(France) Dany Bill	GS Power Giant Tournament, Lumpinee Stadium	Bangkok, Thailand	Decision	5	3:00
1996-	Win	(Thailand) Kongpathapee Sor.Sumalee	GS Power Giant Tournament, Lumpinee Stadium	Bangkok, Thailand	Decision	5	3:00
1996-07-01	Win	(Thailand) Rakchat Chor.Rungsak	Rajadamnern Stadium	Bangkok, Thailand	KO		
Defends the Rajadamnern Stadium Welterweight (147 lbs) title.
1996-	Win	(Thailand) Denkantho Sakthawi	Rajadamnern Stadium	Bangkok, Thailand	TKO	3	
Wins the Rajadamnern Stadium Welterweight (147 lbs) title.
Legend: Win Loss Draw/No contest Notes
