= Coban Lookchaomaesaitong =

Thai former professional Muay Thai fighter

- Born: Banlu Anwiset; August 4, 1966 (age 60); Buriram, Thailand
- Native name: บรรลุ อันวิเศษ
- Nickname: The Crusher; Fist of Mor lam (ไอ้หมัดหมอลำ)
- Height: 163 cm (5 ft 4 in)
- Division: Super Featherweight; Lightweight; Super Lightweight; Welterweight
- Style: Muay Thai (Muay Mat / Muay Bouk)
- Stance: Southpaw
- Team: Muangsurin Gym; Kiatbanchong Gym; Lookchaomaesaitong Gym (-1990)

Kickboxing record
- Total: 270
- Wins: 250
- By knockout: 90
- Losses: 20

Banlu Anwiset (Thai: บรรลุ อันวิเศษ; born August 4, 1966), known professionally as Coban Lookchaomaesaitong (Thai: โคบาล ลูกเจ้าแม่ไทรทอง), is a Thai former professional Muay Thai fighter. He is a two-division Lumpinee Stadium champion who was famous in 1980s and 1990s. He retired in 2000 after a 23-year career in Thailand and moved to New York to coach. He formerly coached at New York Jiu Jitsu in lower Manhattan and Daddis Fight Camps in Philadelphia, Pennsylvania. Coban now splits his time between Buriram, Thailand at Camp Lookchaomaesaitong and Coban's Muay Thai Camp in New York City.

== Biography ==
=== Early years ===
Coban was born as Banlu Anwiset in Buriram, Thailand, near the Cambodian border to a farmers' family of seven. One day while attending a local temple fair, he noticed that fighters were making what looked like easy money with their exhibitions. Seeing this as an opportunity to help his family, he resolved to become the best fighter in Thailand, and dreamed about fighting in Lumpinee stadium someday.

At 11, he started to train muay thai. With no money or resources, he made his own equipment by stuffing rice hulls and sawdust into canvas rice bags. Mimicking the moves of local fighters, he practiced daily after attending school and completing his farming chores. That same year he entered his first fight at a local temple, which resulted in a draw. The little money he earned went towards his family and education. Thus, his career was born.

It was at this time that Banlu acquired his fight name, "Coban," from a teacher of his who said that he looked like the actor Charles Bronson while riding on his Buffalo. At a later point in his career, American fans dubbed him Coban "The Cruncher." While in Thailand, he was dubbed "Fist of Mor lam" because he often dances on the ring with a Mor lam rhythm after a victory.

=== Stardom ===
In 1978, while training at the recreational center, a ringside doctor named Sam Rhung Jong Gon noticed him. He was so impressed with Coban’s determination that he became his official sponsor and mentor. When Coban was 13, Doctor Gon sent him to a Muay Thai camp called Lookchamaesaitong where he trained for the next 9 years. By the age of 15, he had already fought more than 35 fights. At 19, Coban had won his first World Championship at Lumpinee stadium.

In 1990, Camp Lookchamaesaitong closed. To honor the camp, Coban adopted Lookchamaesaitong as his "fighting last name."

Coban fought more than 270 fights in his 23-year career. His last fight was against former student Danny Steele at the Warrior’s Cup in California in September 2000. Despite not having fought in 3 years, Coban won the match.

In 2010, Camp Lookchaomaesaitong in Buriram, Thailand, re-opened. Camp owner, Mr. Nipon Chotison (Renowned and well-respected in the world of Muay Thai) and his son-in-law, Namkabuan Ratchapuekcafe (retired fighter) decided to re-open the original site after being closed for almost 20 years. Coban has also joined the team, and their mission is to preserve the ancient and authentic art and lifestyle of Muay Thai.

The toughest fights of his career were against Ramon Dekkers. He fought him a total of four times, resulting in two wins and two losses. The Coban vs. Dekkers fights have been rated as the best by any standards, by Muay Thai fans worldwide.

== Titles and accomplishments ==
- Lumpinee Stadium
  - 1985 Lumpinee Stadium Super Featherweight (130 lbs) Champion
  - 1990 Lumpinee Stadium Lightweight (135 lbs) Champion
- World Muaythai Council
  - 1991 WMT World Super Lightweight (140 lbs) Champion
- International Muaythai Federation
  - 1992 IMF World Welterweight (147 lbs) Champion

== Fight record ==
Kickboxing record
270 fights, 250 wins, 90 KOs, 20 losses
Date	Result	Opponent	Event	Location	Method	Round	Time
2000-09-09	Win	(United States) Danny Steele	Warriors Cup of America	Irvine, California, United States	Decision (split)	5	3:00
Wins the title of Warriors Cup.
?	Win	(United States) Tony Carr	World Championship Kickboxing	United States	KO (low kick)	3	
Wins the WKBA World Middleweight title.
1998-09-25	Loss	(Kyrgyzstan) Malik Borbashev	Draka VI	Los Angeles, California, United States	TKO (retirement)	7	0:00
1998-07-07	Loss	(United States) Manson Gibson	Crystal Park Casino Outdoor Show	Los Angeles, CA, USA	TKO (right back kick)	5	1:59
Fight was for the vacant IKF Pro World Muaythai Light cruiserweight title.
1998-05-24	Loss	(Kyrgyzstan) Malik Borbashev	Draka V	Los Angeles, California, United States	Decision (unanimous)		
Fight was for the vacant Draka World Super middleweight title.
1994-	Loss	(France) Guillaume Kerner		Los Angeles, United States	Decision	5	3:00
For the WTMC World title.
1994-08-03	Win	(France) Dany Bill	Lumpinee Stadium	Bangkok, Thailand	Decision	5	3:00
1994-06-25	Loss	(Netherlands) Ramon Dekkers		Paris, France	Decision (unanimous)	5	3:00
1994	Win	(United States) Hector Pena			KO (left hook)	2	
Defends the Muay Thai World Welterweight (147 lbs) title.
1993-02-14	Win	(France) Dida Diafat	Thai Boxing World Championship	Brest, France	Decision (unanimous)	5	3:00
?	Loss	(Thailand) Orono Por.MuangUbon		Thailand	Decision	5	3:00
1992-10-03	Win	(France) Jo Prestia		Levallois-Perret, France	Decision	5	3:00
Wins the Muay Thai World Welterweight (147 lbs) title.
1992-05-30	Loss	(Thailand) Superlek Sornisaan	Lumpinee Stadium	Bangkok, Thailand	Decision	5	3:00
1992-02-28	Win	(Netherlands) Ramon Dekkers		Samut Prakan, Thailand	Decision (unanimous)	5	3:00
Wins the vacant IMF World Welterweight (147 lbs) title.
1992-02-08	Win	(Thailand) Samransak Muangsurin	Lumpinee Stadium	Bangkok, Thailand	KO	2	
1991-11-	Loss	(Thailand) Nongmoon Chomphutong	Lumpinee Stadium	Bangkok, Thailand	Decision	5	3:00
Loses the Lumpinee Stadium Lightweight (135 lbs) title.
1991-10-26	Loss	(Thailand) Sakmongkol Sithchuchok	Lumpinee Stadium	Bangkok, Thailand	Decision	5	3:00
1991-	Win	(Thailand) Nuenthong Senkiri	Lumpinee Stadium	Bangkok, Thailand	KO	2	
1991-	Win	(United Kingdom) Humphrey Harrison		Netherlands	Decision	5	3:00
WTMC World Super Welterweight title.
1991-08-06	Loss	(Netherlands) Ramon Dekkers	Lumpinee Stadium	Bangkok, Thailand	KO (punches)	1	
1991-07-02	Win	(Thailand) Chanchai Sor Tamarangsri	Lumpinee Stadium	Bangkok, Thailand	KO	1	
1991-05-31	Win	(Thailand) Samransak Muangsurin	Lumpinee Stadium	Bangkok, Thailand	KO	3	
1991-04-21	Win	(Netherlands) Ramon Dekkers	IKL	Paris, France	KO (left hook)	1	1:00
1991-	Win	(France) Dida Diafat	World Muaythai Championship	Germany	Decision (unanimous)	5	3:00
Wins World Muay Thai title.
1991-	Win	(Thailand) Chombueng Chor.Waikul		New Zealand	TKO	4	
1991-	Win	(Thailand) Noppadet Sor.Samruang		Ayutthaya, Thailand	Decision	5	3:00
1990-	Win	(Thailand) Bandon Sitbangprachan	Lumpinee Stadium	Bangkok, Thailand	KO (punches)	2	
Wins the vacant Lumpinee Stadium Lightweight (135 lbs) title.
1990-07-29	Win	(United Kingdom) Oliver Harrison		England	TKO (referee stopapge)	5	
Defends WTMC World Super Lightweight title.
1990-06-30	Loss	(Thailand) Tantawannoi Sitsilachai	Lumpinee Stadium	Bangkok, Thailand	Referee stoppage	4	
1990-05-27	Win	(Netherlands) Tommy van de Berg	Holland vs Thailand	Amsterdam, Netherlands	KO (left hook)	1	
1990-04-24	Win	(Netherlands) Joao Vieira	Lumpinee Stadium	Bangkok, Thailand	Decision	5	3:00
1990-03-06	Loss	(Thailand) Boonchai HuaSaiGym		Chachoengsao province, Thailand	Decision	5	3:00
1989-12-01	Loss	(Thailand) Bandon Sitbangprachan		Ubon, Thailand	KO	4	
1989-11-04	Win	(Thailand) Chombueng Chor.Waikul		Sisaket, Thailand	Decision	5	3:00
1989-10-29	Win	(Thailand) Sornarin Welnakhompathom		Nakhon Pathom, Thailand	KO (high kick)	4	
1989-10-	Draw	(Thailand) Saksit Muangsurin		Buriram, Thailand	Decision	5	3:00
1989-07-01	Win	(Thailand) Buakaew Kiatlansang		Thailand	Decision	5	3:00
1989-06-10	Win	(Thailand) Palannoi Kiatanan		Thailand	KO	2	
1989-05-18	Win	(Thailand) Sornarin Welnakhompathom		Mueang Chanthaburi, Thailand	Decision	5	3:00
1989-04-24	Win	(Thailand) Kongkiat Sor.Jimmanchof		Sisaket, Thailand	KO	3	
1989-04-12	Win	(Thailand) Chombueng Chor. Waikul		Korat, Thailand	Decision	5	3:00
1989-03-31	Loss	(Thailand) Boonchai HuaSaiGym		Pattani, Thailand	Decision	5	3:00
1989-03-04	NC	(Thailand) Saksit Muangsurin	Omnoi Stadium	Samut Sakhon, Thailand	Saksit dismissed	4	
1989-01-07	Win	(Thailand) Samart Fairtex	Omnoi Stadium	Samut Sakhon, Thailand	KO	3	
1988-	Win	(Thailand) Nongmoon Chomphutong		Thailand	KO		
	Win	(Thailand) Barndon Sitbangprachan		Thailand	KO		
	Win	(Thailand) Fallanoi Kietanan		Thailand	KO		
1987-05-19	Win	(Thailand) Taunting Sityodtong	Rangsit Stadium	Rangsit, Thailand	Decision	5	3:00
1987-01-23	Loss	(Thailand) Phayapung Ekamit	Rangsit Stadium	Rangsit, Thailand	Decision	5	3:00
For the Magnum Tiger Tournament title.
1986-11-28	Draw	(Thailand) Ritthichai Singkhiri	Rangsit Stadium	Rangsit, Thailand	Decision	5	3:00
1986-09-26	Win	(Thailand) Lamkhong Sitwaiwat	Rangsit Stadium	Rangsit, Thailand	KO	3	
1986-08-08	Loss	(Thailand) Tantawannoi Sitsilachai	Rangsit Stadium	Rangsit, Thailand	TKO (doctor stoppage)	3	
1986-07-04	Win	(Thailand) Saksit Muangsurin		Ubon Ratchathani, Thailand	KO	4	
	Loss	(Thailand) Tantawannoi Sitsilachai		Thailand			
	Loss	(Thailand) Tantawannoi Sitsilachai		Thailand			
	Loss	(Thailand) Tantawannoi Sitsilachai		Thailand			
Legend: Win Loss Draw/no contest Notes

== See also ==
- List of K-1 events
- List of male kickboxers
