= Kenichi Ogata (shoot boxer) =

Japanese martial artist

- Born: January 26, 1975 (age 51); Yuya, Yamaguchi, Japan
- Native name: 緒形 健一
- Nationality: Japanese
- Height: 172 cm (5 ft 8 in)
- Weight: 72 kg (159 lb; 11 st 5 lb)
- Division: Super Welterweight
- Style: Shoot boxing, Judo
- Fighting out of: Asakusa, Tokyo, Japan
- Team: Cesar Gym
- Trainer: Caesar Takeshi
- Rank: 2nd dan black belt in Judo
- Years active: 1996–2010

Kickboxing record
- Total: 61
- Wins: 43
- By knockout: 27
- Losses: 17
- By knockout: 8
- Draws: 1

Mixed martial arts record
- Total: 2
- Wins: 0
- Losses: 1
- By submission: 1
- Draws: 1

Other information
- Website: plus-u.jp/blog/sbogata (archived)
- Mixed martial arts record from Sherdog
- Last updated on: November 11, 2010

Kenichi Ogata (Japanese: 緒形 健一, Ogata Ken'ichi) [oɡata keɴiꜜtɕi]; born January 26, 1975) is a Japanese super welterweight shoot boxer, fighting out of Cesar Gym in Asakusa. He was the first Japanese national champion of shoot boxing at Super welterweight. He is the winner of S-cup in 2006 and the finalist of 2008 S-cup.

His real name is still Kenichi Ogata, but it is written as "尾形健一".

== Biography ==
=== Young age ===
Kenichi Ogata was born in town of Yuya, Yamaguchi, Japan on January 26, 1975. "Yuya", his hometown, was merged with other towns into Nagato City in 2005. He graduated from Nagato High School.

=== Debut ===
He debuted in November 1994 as a professional shoot boxer.

On May 9, 1997, he participated Super Fight in the event of Shoot Boxing World Tournament 1997, and fought against Dany Bill from France. He was knocked down with right cross and knocked down with right upper cut again during 5R. His second threw the towel into the ring just after 2nd knock down. After this bout, he was hospitalized because of nose broken.

On October 12, he participated "'97 The Festival of Martial Arts Special" as the representative of shoot boxing and fought against Sitisak Tor Anuson who was the champion of Lumpinee Stadium at Junior welterweight. This event was promoted by World Karate Association, but it is not WKA established in USA. Ogata was knocked out by cut with right elbow during 5R. After this bout, he was hospitalized because of Orbital blowout fracture.

On April 26, 1998, he fought against Gilbert Ballantine from Netherlands in the event of "RKS Presents Shoot the Shooto XX". This was the comeback bout after he had been beaten by Sitisak and Bill. He won by the unanimous decision after 5R. He was going to be retired if he lost.

On October 20, 2001, he had the first Mixed martial arts(MMA) bout against Curtis Brigham at lightweight in the event of Rings because the Shoot Boxing Association had cooperation with Rings. He was beaten in 43 seconds by choke.

On July 7, 2002, he participated Shoot Boxing World Tournament 2002 to fight against Ngkau Spain under KOK rule of Rings in MMA bout, but the bout was resulted as draw after 3R.

=== Winning national title ===
He fought against Seiichiro Nishibayashi for the vacant first Japanese national title at "Junior falconweight" on June 4, 1998, and he cut Nishibayashi's bottom eyelid when he kicked head, and knocked down with punches during 3R. Nishibayashi stood up, but referee stopped the bout because of too much bleeding, and Ogata won by TKO at 2:15 during 3R and became the first champion. "Junior falconweight" was renamed to "Super seagullweight", and renamed to welterweight again on November 20, 2001, but Ogata's title was changed to Super welterweight, not welterweight.

On November 14, 1998, he challenged Ramon Dekkers' WPKL World Junior middleweight championship (-69.85 kg) in Chiyoda, Tokyo, but he was knocked out with left hook at 2:58 during 4R. Ogata was knocked down with left hook in the end of 1R, and with right cross during 3R.

On November 1, 2000, he participated K-1 J-MAX 2000 as the representative of shoot boxing, and fought against Sakon Kubosaka. He knocked out Kubosaka by left body shot with left knee during 5R.

On February 24, 2004, Ogata participated K-1 World MAX 2004 Japan Tournament and fought against Kozo Takeda in the quarter-final. He knocked down Takeda with left hook during 1R, but Ogata's second threw their towel into the ring just after 2R starts because he had hurt his leg during 1R when he stepped into Takeda to knock down. He explained that his left knee was injured badly in a bout on February 1, and he managed to train only for 4–5 days because of hematoma and Strain of his calf of his leg, moreover, he could not bend his knee more than 90 degrees. His condition had been bad, but he decided to participate because of promise. The result of this bout is announced as Takeda's victory by the unanimous decision after 3R in the official website, but it is wrong.

=== Winning S-cup 2006 ===
On November 3, 2006, Ogata participated Shoot Boxing World Tournament 2006. In the quarter-final, he knocked down Damacio Page with left body shot in 1R, but he was knocked down with right hook after that. Ogata knocked out Page with 2 knock downs by left body shots during 2R. In the semi-final, Ogata defeated Hiroki Shishido by the unanimous decision. In the final, Ogata knocked down Andy Souwer with right hook during 1R and won by the unanimous decision. Ogata won the tournament of S-cup as the second Japanese.

On November 30, 2007, he announced that he returns his title of Super welterweight in the beginning of the event because he was suggested to return his title by Caesar Takeshi when he consulted about his bad performance in bouts caused by his poor health. Caesar Takeshi answered "If you feel so, you should return your belt and try as much as possible from nothing to the end, and quit when you are convinced." during consulting.

=== Retirement ===
On November 2, 2010, he announced his retirement during the press conference of S-cup 2010, and he said he had a plan to hold his retirement ceremony in S-cup 2010. According to his explanation, he tried to continue his career, but he was stopped by doctor as his cervical vertebrae had not been recovered since the bout against Andy Souwer on November 24, 2008.

== Titles ==
=== Professional ===
- SHOOT BOXING
  - 1998 Shoot Boxing Japan Super Welterweight (Falconweight) Champion

== Record ==
Professional kickboxing record
61 Fights, 43 wins (27 (T)KOs), 17 Losses, 1 Draw
Date	Result	Opponent	Event	Location	Method	Round	Time
2009-06-01	Loss	(United States) Tyler Toner	Shoot Boxing 2009 Bushido 3rd	Bunkyo, Tokyo, Japan	KO (Right high kick)	1	3:00
2008-11-24	Loss	(Netherlands) Andy Souwer	Shoot Boxing World Tournament 2008 Final	Saitama, Saitama, Japan	KO (3 knockdowns)	2	2:11
2008-11-24	Win	(Brazil) Luiz Azeredo	Shoot Boxing World Tournament 2008 Semi-final	Saitama, Saitama, Japan	KO (Right hook)	2	2:11
2008-11-24	Win	(Japan) Kenji Kanai	Shoot Boxing World Tournament 2008 Quarter-final	Saitama, Saitama, Japan	KO (Right straight)	2	2:58
2008-09-12	Win	(Australia) Jason Scerri	Shoot Boxing 2008 Tamashi - Road to S-cup - 5th	Bunkyo, Tokyo, Japan	TKO (Referee stoppage)	3	0:56
2008-05-28	Win	(South Korea) Doo-Suk Oh	Shoot Boxing 2008 Tamashi - Road to S-cup - 3rd	Bunkyo, Tokyo, Japan	Decision (Majority)	3	3:00
2007-10-28	Loss	(Netherlands) Brian Lo-A-Njoe	Shoot Boxing Battle Summit Ground Zero Tokyo 2007	Sumida, Tokyo, Japan	KO (Right hook)	2	0:44
2007-07-28	Loss	(Canada) Adam Higson	Shoot Boxing 2007 Mu-So 3rd	Bunkyo, Tokyo, Japan	Decision (Unanimous)	3	3:00
2007-05-25	Win	(China) Xu Yan	Shoot Boxing 2007 Mu-So 2nd	Bunkyo, Tokyo, Japan	KO (Body shot with left knee)	3	0:56
2007-02-25	Loss	(Thailand) Big Ben Kesa Gym	Shoot Boxing 2007 Mu-So 1st	Bunkyo, Tokyo, Japan	KO (Right hook)	2	1:04
2006-11-03	Win	(Netherlands) Andy Souwer	Shoot Boxing World Tournament 2006 Final	Chiyoda, Tokyo, Japan	Decision (Unanimous)	3	3:00
Wins the Shoot Boxing S-Cup 2006 Tournament title.
2006-11-03	Win	(Japan) Hiroki Shishido	Shoot Boxing World Tournament 2006 Semi-final	Chiyoda, Tokyo, Japan	Decision (Unanimous)	3	3:00
2006-11-03	Win	(United States) Damacio Page	Shoot Boxing World Tournament 2006 Quarter-final	Chiyoda, Tokyo, Japan	KO (Left body shot)	2	1:14
2006-09-23	Win	(Japan) Takashi Ohno	WSBA "Shoot Boxing 2006 Neo ΟΡΘΡΟΣ Series 5th"	Chiyoda, Tokyo, Japan	Decision (Unanimous)	5	3:00
2006-07-07	Win	(Canada) Ryan Diaz	WSBA "Shoot Boxing 2006 Neo ΟΡΘΡΟΣ Series 4th"	Chiyoda, Tokyo, Japan	Decision (Unanimous)	5	3:00
2006-05-26	Win	(Australia) Paul Smith	WSBA "Shoot Boxing 2006 Neo ΟΡΘΡΟΣ Series 3rd"	Bunkyo, Tokyo, Japan	KO (Punches)	2	2:57
2006-03-25	Win	(South Korea) Kim Yeon Jong	WSBA "Shoot Boxing 2006 Neo ΟΡΘΡΟΣ Series 2nd"	Tokyo, Japan	TKO	4	1:35
2006-02-09	Ex	(Netherlands) Andy Souwer	WSBA "Shoot Boxing 2006 Neo ΟΡΘΡΟΣ Series 1st"	Bunkyo, Tokyo, Japan	No Decision	1	2:00
Ogata was going to fight against Johnny Eduardo from Brazil, but the bout was canceled just before it because he lost consciousness after weighing and it was diagnosed as syncope by the doctor.
2005-11-25	Win	(Turkey) Karimi Shonan	WSBA "Shoot Boxing 20th Anniversary Series Final"	Bunkyo, Tokyo, Japan	KO (Right straight)	3	0:53
2005-06-26	Loss	(South Korea) Chi Bin Lim	WSBA "Shoot Boxing 20th Anniversary Series 3rd"	Bunkyo, Tokyo, Japan	TKO (Doctor stoppage, cut)	2	3:00
2005-03-06	Win	(United States) Shane Wiggand	WSBA "Shoot Boxing 20th Anniversary Series First"	Bunkyo, Tokyo, Japan	KO (3 knockdowns)	2	1:44
2005-01-23	Win	(Turkey) Serkan Yilmaz	Shoot Boxing 2005 Ground Zero Fukuoka	Fukuoka, Fukuoka, Japan	Decision (Unanimous)	6 (Ex.1)	3:00
2004-12-03	Win	(United States) Peter Kaljevic	WSBA "∞-S Vol.6"	Osaka, Osaka, Japan	Decision (Unanimous)	5	3:00
2004-09-19	Loss	(Brazil) Katel Kubis	Shoot Boxing World Tournament 2004 Quarter-final	Yokohama, Kanagawa, Japan	TKO (Doctor stoppage, cut)	1	1:32
2004-04-18	Win	(United States) Jake Hattan	WSBA "∞-S Vol.2"	Bunkyo, Tokyo, Japan	TKO (Towel thrown)	2	3:00
2004-02-24	Loss	(Japan) Kozo Takeda	K-1 World MAX 2004 Japan Tournament	Shibuya, Tokyo, Japan	TKO (Towel thrown)	1	3:00
2004-02-01	Win	(New Zealand) Ngkau Spain	WSBA "∞-S Vol.1"	Bunkyo, Tokyo, Japan	KO (3 knockdowns)	2	2:22
2003-12-07	Win	(United States) Vladislav Klikfeld	WSBA "S" of the World Vol.6"	Osaka, Osaka, Japan	KO (3 knockdowns)	2	1:32
2003-06-01	Loss	(New Zealand) Shane Chapman	WSBA "S" of the World Vol.3"	Bunkyo, Tokyo, Japan	Decision (Unanimous)	5	3:00
2003-04-13	Win	(Australia) Ryland Mahoney	WSBA "S" of the World Vol.2"	Bunkyo, Tokyo, Japan	KO (Body shot)	3	1:50
2002-11-04	Loss	(Netherlands) Andy Souwer	WSBA "The age of "S" Vol.5"	Bunkyo, Tokyo, Tokyo	Decision (Unanimous)	5	3:00
2002-05-13	Win	(Australia) Jeremy Allen	WSBA "The age of "S" Vol.3"	Osaka, Osaka, Japan	Decision (Unanimous)	5	3:00
2002-03-31	Win	(United States) Tony Valente	WSBA "The age of "S" Vol.2"	Bunkyo, Tokyo, Tokyo	TKO (3 knockdowns)	3	2:54
2002-02-01	Win	(Netherlands) Jermaine Pielow	WSBA "The age of "S" Vol.1"	Bunkyo, Tokyo, Tokyo	KO (Right hook)	4	2:37
2001-11-20	Win	(Brazil) Daniel Silva	WSBA "Be A Champ 4th Stage"	Bunkyo, Tokyo, Tokyo	KO (Middle kick)	2	2:36
2001-09-25	Win	(China) Hong Guo	WSBA "Be A Champ 3rd Stage"	Bunkyo, Tokyo, Tokyo	TKO (Gave up)	4	0:00
2001-07-9	Loss	(Australia) Daniel Dawson	X-Plosion On Jupiter	Gold Coast, Australia	TKO (Corner Stop/Knee to Body)	3	
The bout was for Dawson's WMTA World Super welterweight title.
2001-04-30	Win	(South Korea) Jong-Gong Kim	WSBA "Be A Champ 2nd Stage"	Bunkyo, Tokyo, Tokyo	KO (3 knockdowns)	1	4:33
2000-11-30	Win	(France) Elizabeth Oliver	WSBA "Invade 5th Stage"	Bunkyo, Tokyo, Japan	Decision (Unanimous)	3	3:00
2000-11-01	Win	(Japan) Sakon Kubosaka	K-1 J-MAX 2000	Bunkyo, Tokyo, Japan	KO (Left body shot)	5	2:03
2000-09-20	Win	(United States) David Morrow	WSBA "Invade 4th Stage"	Bunkyo, Tokyo, Japan	KO (Punches)	1	1:44
2000-05-21	Win	(United States) Kit Cope	WSBA "Invade 3rd Stage"	Bunkyo, Tokyo, Japan	Decision (Unanimous)	3	3:00
1999-06-10	Loss	(United States) Douglas Alan Evans	WSBA "Against 1999 2nd"	Bunkyo, Tokyo, Japan	KO	1	1:34
1999-03-10	Win	(United States) David Solomon	WSBA "Against 1999 1st"	Bunkyo, Tokyo, Japan	TKO (Towel thrown)	1	1:31
1999-04-24	Loss	(Australia) John Wayne Parr	MAJKF	Bunkyo, Tokyo, Tokyo	KO (Left hook)	2	1:49
1998-11-14	Loss	(Netherlands) Ramon Dekkers	WSBA "Ground Zero Tokyo"	Chiyoda, Tokyo, Japan	KO(Left hook)	4	2:58
The bout was for Dekkers' WPKL World Junior middleweight title.
1998-09-05	Ex	(Japan) Taro Minato	WSBA "SB the Coming Generation"	Bunkyo, Tokyo, Japan	No Decision	2	2:00
Ogata was going to fight against Luke Kenton, but it was canceled as he had been injured in his previous bout in Thailand.
1998-07-17	Win	(Japan) Ryuji Goto	WSBA "SK-XX 3rd"	Osaka, Osaka, Japan	TKO(dislocation)	3	0:54
1998-06-04	Win	(Japan) Seiichiro Nishibayashi	WSBA "SK-XX 2nd"	Bunkyo, Tokyo, Tokyo	TKO (Cut)	3	2:15
Wins the inaugural JSBA SFalconweight (-70kg) Title. The "falconweight" division was renamed to "Shoot Boxing Japan Super welterweight."
1998-04-26	Win	(Netherlands) Gilbert Ballantine	WSBA "RKS Presents Shoot the Shooto XX"	Yokohama, Kanagawa, Japan	Decision (Unanimous)	3	3:00
1997-10-12	Loss	(Thailand) Sitisak Tor Anuson	WKA "'97 The Festival of Martial Arts Special"	Sumida, Tokyo, Japan	KO (Right elbow)	5	1:39
1997-05-09	Loss	(France) Dany Bill	Shoot Boxing World Tournament 1997, Super Fight	Shibuya, Tokyo, Japan	TKO (Towel thrown)	5	1:42
1997-03-23	Win	(United States) Lafayette Lawson	WSBA		KO	1	
1996-07-14	Win	(Brazil) Marcelo Oliveira Aguiar	Shoot Boxing - S Cup 1996	Koto, Tokyo, Japan	Decision (Unanimous)	3	3:00
1996-05-	Win	(Japan) Takashi Ito	MAJKF	Bunkyo, Tokyo, Japan	Decision	5	3:00
1996-01-27	Loss	(Japan) Tatsuya Suzuki	Shootfighting Carnival Ground Zero Yokohama - Fighting Festival -	Yokohama, Kanagawa, Japan	Decision (Unanimous)	3	3:00

Professional MMA record
2 Fights 1 Loss 1 Draw
Date	Result	Opponent	Event	Location	Method	Round	Time
2002-07-07	Draw	(New Zealand) Ngkau Spain	Shoot Boxing World Tournament 2002, Super Fight	Yokohama, Kanagawa, Japan	Draw (0-0)	3	5:00
2001-10-20	Loss	(Canada) Curtis Brigham	Rings "World Title Series"	Shibuya, Tokyo, Japan	Submission (Choke)	1	0:43
Legend: Win Loss Draw/No contest Notes

== Mixed martial arts record ==
Professional record breakdown
2 matches	0 wins	1 loss
By submission	0	1
Draws	1	

Res.	Record	Opponent	Method	Event	Date	Round	Time	Location	Notes
Draw	0-1-1	Narkou Spain	Draw	Shoot Boxing - S-Cup 2002	July 7, 2002	3	5:00	Kanagawa, Japan	
Loss	0-1	Curtis Brigham	Submission (Rear Naked Choke)	Rings: World Title Series 4	October 20, 2001	1	0:43	Tokyo, Japan	

== Titles ==
- 1st Shoot Boxing Japanese Junior falconweight (Super welterweight) Champion (Defense: 0)
- 2008 Shoot boxing World tournament 2nd place
- 2006 Shoot boxing World tournament champion

== See also ==
- List of male kickboxers
- List of K-1 Events
