= Samranthong Kiatbanchong =

Thai professional Muay Thai fighter (1971–2008)

- Samranthong in the 1990s
- Born: Samran Chumanee; July 16, 1971; Thung Yai, Thung Yai, Nakhon Si Thammarat, Thailand
- Died: February 16, 2008 (aged 37)
- Native name: สำราญ ชูมณี
- Other names: Samranthong Chuchokchai (สำราญทอง ซูโชคชัย)
- Nickname: Little Chicken (น้องไก่, personal nickname)
- Height: 171 cm (5 ft 7 in)
- Division: Super Flyweight; Bantamweight; Super Bantamweight; Featherweight
- Style: Muay Thai (Muay Femur)
- Stance: Southpaw
- Team: Kiatbanchong

Other information
- Notable relatives: Jaroenthong Kiatbanchong (older brother); Chalamthong Kiatbanchong (older brother)

Samran Chumanee (Thai: สำราญ ชูมณี July 16, 1971 – February 16, 2008), known professionally as Samranthong Kiatbanchong (Thai: สำราญทอง เกียรติบ้านช่อง), was a Thai professional Muay Thai fighter. He was a high ranked fighter at the Lumpinee Stadium during the 1980s and 1990s. He was the younger brother of Jaroenthong Kiatbanchong, also a successful and famous Muay Thai fighter.

== Biography and career ==
Samran Chumanee was born in the village of Thung Yai in Thung Yai, Nakhon Si Thammarat, Thailand on July 16, 1971. He came from a family of nine children, of which he was the eighth child, and was raised by his widowed mother who worked on a rubber plantation.

He spent his professional career training at the Kiatbanchong gym alongside fighters such as his brother, Jaroenthong Kiatbanchong, as well as Oley Kiatoneway and Jaroensap Kiatbanchong.

He fought during the Golden Era of Muay Thai against many notable fighters including Kongtoranee Payakaroon, Samransak Muangsurin, Wangchannoi Sor.Palangchai, Langsuan Panyuthaphum, Namkabuan Nongkeepahuyuth, Boonlai Sor.Thanikul, Pairot Wor.Walapon, Dokmaipa Por Pongsawang, Jongsanan Fairtex,Nuathoranee Thongracha, and Ritthichai Lookchaomaesaitong.

Samranthong died following a car accident on February 16, 2008, at the age of 37.

== Fight record ==
Muay Thai Record (Incomplete)
Date	Result	Opponent	Event	Location	Method	Round	Time
1993-09-25	Loss	(Thailand) Kaonar Sor.Kettalingchan	Lumpinee Stadium	Bangkok, Thailand	Decision	5	3:00
1993-03-01	Win	(Thailand) Samingnoi Kiatkamchai	Lumpinee Stadium	Bangkok, Thailand	KO (elbow)	3	
?	Win	(United States) Hector Pena		United States	Decision	5	3:00
Wins the WCK Muay Thai World title.
1992-06-03	Win	(Thailand) Kaonar Sor.Kettalingchan	Lumpinee Stadium	Bangkok, Thailand	Decision	5	3:00
1992-04-07	Loss	(Thailand) Samransak Muangsurin	Lumpinee Stadium	Bangkok, Thailand	KO	2	
?	Win	(Thailand) Piewpong Sit Bobey	Rajadamnern Stadium	Bangkok, Thailand	TKO (retirement)	2	3:00
1991-09-13	Loss	(Thailand) Ritthichai Lookchaomaesaitong	Lumpinee Stadium	Bangkok, Thailand	Decision	5	3:00
1991-08-13	Loss	(Thailand) Samingnoi Kiatkamchai	Lumpinee Stadium	Bangkok, Thailand	KO (high kick)	2	
1991-07-30	Win	(Thailand) Boonlertlek Sor.Nantana	Lumpinee Stadium	Bangkok, Thailand	Decision	5	3:00
1991-06-28	Loss	(Thailand) Boonlai Sor.Thanikul	Lumpinee Stadium	Bangkok, Thailand	Decision	5	3:00
1991-06-04	Draw	(Thailand) Jongsanan Fairtex	Lumpinee Stadium	Bangkok, Thailand	Decision	5	3:00
1991-04-05	Loss	(Thailand) Wangchannoi Sor.Palangchai	Lumpinee Stadium	Bangkok, Thailand	TKO	1	1:30
1991-03-22	Loss	(Thailand) Boonlai Sor.Thanikul	Lumpinee Stadium	Bangkok, Thailand	Decision	5	3:00
1991-03-01	Loss	(Thailand) Namkabuan Nongkeepahuyuth	Lumpinee Stadium	Bangkok, Thailand	Decision	5	3:00
1991-02-09	Win	(Thailand) Ritthichai Lookchaomaesaitong	Lumpinee Stadium	Bangkok, Thailand	TKO (doctor stoppage)	3	
1991-01-26	Win	(Thailand) Rainbow Sor.Prantalay	Lumpinee Stadium	Bangkok, Thailand	Decision	5	3:00
1990-12-11	Loss	(Thailand) Nuathoranee Thongracha	Lumpinee Stadium	Bangkok, Thailand	Decision	5	3:00
1990-10-30	Loss	(Thailand) Dokmaipa Por Pongsawang	Lumpinee Stadium	Bangkok, Thailand	TKO (Punches)	2	
1990-10-12	Win	(Thailand) Detduang Por.Pongsawang	Lumpinee Stadium	Bangkok, Thailand	Decision	5	3:00
1990-09-25	Win	(Thailand) Namkabuan Nongkeepahuyuth	Lumpinee Stadium	Bangkok, Thailand	KO (Elbows)	3	
1990-08-31	Win	(Thailand) Langsuan Panyuthaphum	OneSongchai, Lumpinee Stadium	Bangkok, Thailand	TKO (punches)	4	
1990-07-21	Loss	(Thailand) Ritthichai Lookchaomaesaitong	Lumpinee Stadium	Bangkok, Thailand	Decision	5	3:00
1990-06-05	Win	(Thailand) Noenthong Singkiree	Lumpinee Stadium	Bangkok, Thailand	Decision	5	3:00
1990-04-27	Win	(Thailand) Panphet Muangsurin	Lumpinee Stadium	Bangkok, Thailand	KO	2	
1990-	Loss	(Thailand) Kaonar Sor.Kettalingchan	Lumpinee Stadium	Bangkok, Thailand	Decision	5	3:00
1990-	Win	(Thailand) Banluesak Lukprabat	Lumpinee Stadium	Bangkok, Thailand	KO	4	
1990-02-21	Win	(Thailand) Chuchai Saksamut	Lumpinee Stadium	Bangkok, Thailand	TKO (doctor stoppage)	2	
1990-	Win	(Thailand) Pairot Wor.Walapon	Lumpinee Stadium	Bangkok, Thailand	Decision	5	3:00
1989-10-03	Loss	(Thailand) Panphet Muangsurin	Lumpinee Stadium	Bangkok, Thailand	KO	2	
1989-	Win	(Thailand) Kongtoranee Payakaroon	Lumpinee Stadium	Bangkok, Thailand	Decision	5	3:00
1989-08-11	Win	(Thailand) Yodmanut Sit Yodtong	Lumpinee Stadium	Bangkok, Thailand	Decision	5	3:00
1988-12-02	Loss	(Thailand) Pichit Sitbangprachan	Lumpinee Stadium	Bangkok, Thailand	KO	2	
Legend: Win Loss Draw/No contest Notes
