= Pairot Wor.Walapon =

Thai former professional Muay Thai fighter

- Born: Pairot Maithong; October 22, 1973 (age 53); Sikhoraphum, Surin, Thailand
- Native name: ไพโรจน์ ไหมทอง
- Nickname: Asura Left (ซ้ายอสูร)
- Height: 171 cm (5 ft 7 in)
- Division: Super Featherweight; Lightweight; Super Lightweight
- Style: Muay Thai (Muay Tae)
- Stance: Southpaw
- Team: Kiatsingnoi Gym (Wor.Walapon); Tiger Muay Thai (formerly)
- Trainer: Singnoi Silachai
- Years active: c. 1986–1997, 2005

Other information
- Occupation: Muay Thai fighter (retired); Muay Thai trainer
- Notable relatives: Pichai Wor.Walapon (older brother)

Pairot Maithong (Thai: ไพโรจน์ ไหมทอง; born October 22, 1973), known professionally as Pairot Wor.Walapon (Thai: ไพโรจน์ ว.วราพล), is a Thai former professional Muay Thai fighter. He is a former Lumpinee Stadium Lightweight Champion who was famous in the 1990s. Nicknamed "Asura Left", he was especially known for his powerful southpaw kicking style.

== Biography and career ==
Born as Pairot Maithong on October 22, 1973 in Sikhoraphum district, Surin province. He was the fourth child among the six children of Sompong and Prasong Maithong, who had a career as a trader. He fought for the first time at the age of 12 following his older brother named Pichai Wor.Walapon for only 50 baht. Pairot made his debut in Bangkok in 1988 after which he quickly became popular. He quit the sport for over a year in 1990 due to the toll it was taking on his body. He made his comeback in 1992 and by the next year he became a household name on the circuit.

Pairot had battled with many of the top Muay Thai kickboxers of the era, such as Mathee Jadeepitak, Namkabuan Nongkeepahuyuth, Pichit Sitbangprachan, Sangtiennoi Sor.Rungroj, Orono Por Muang Ubon, Therdkiat Sitthepitak, Sakmongkol Sithchuchok, Cherry Sor Wanich, Jongsanan Fairtex.

Training at the Kiatsingnoi camp (AKA the Wor.Walapon camp) in Bangkok, Pairot was a southpaw Muay Tae fighter (Muay Thai fighter who focuses on kicks). He had an opportunistic kicking style which he used to counterstrike his opponents, particularly with powerful kicks to the ribs or arms and minimized openings for his opponents to exploit. He was nicknamed "Asura Left" as he was known as one of the best Muay Tae fighters of the 1990s. 1992 was the best year of his career as he had won 5 fights against fighters including Orono Por.MuangUbon, Nuathoranee Thongracha, and Cherry Sor.Wanich and incurred only 2 losses.

In 1996 he would win the Beer Chang tournament final against Sakmongkol Sitchuchok. The bout was subsequently awarded the Fight of the Year award by Sports Writers Association of Thailand. Pairot would be ordained as a monk after the victory. In 2005 Pairot had returned to Muay Thai competition to compete in Onesongchai's S1 World Championship that was held on the Queen of Thailand's birthday. Pairot progressed to the final to compete against the English Steve Wakeling and was knocked out by a knee strike to the head.

After retiring from competition, Pairot became a trainer in various camps in Thailand such as Tiger Muay Thai along his son Samson but also abroad in China and Hong Kong.

== Titles and honours ==
- Lumpinee Stadium
  - 1994 Lumpinee Stadium Lightweight (135 lbs) Champion
- Beer Chang
  - 1996 Beer Chang Light Welterweight (140 lbs) Tournament Winner
- Onesongchai
  - 2005 S-1 World Championship Tournament runner-up
- Sports Writers Association of Thailand
  - 1996 Fight of the Year (vs Sakmongkol Sithchuchok for the Beer Chang tournament final)

== Fight record ==
Muay Thai Record
Date	Result	Opponent	Event	Location	Method	Round	Time
2005-08-12	Loss	(United Kingdom) Steve Wakeling	S-1 World Championship, Final	Bangkok, Thailand	KO (Knee to the head)	3	
For the 2005 S-1 World Championship −72kg title.
2005-08-12	Win	(Slovakia) Jan Mazur	S-1 World Championship, Semi-final	Bangkok, Thailand	Decision	3	3:00
2005-08-12	Win	(United Kingdom) Alex Dally	S-1 World Championship, Quarter Final	Bangkok, Thailand	Decision	3	3:00
1997-02-28	Loss	(Thailand) Sakmongkol Sithchuchok	Lumpinee Stadium	Bangkok, Thailand	TKO (High kick)	3	3:00
1997-01-05	Win	(Thailand) Namkabuan Nongkeepahuyuth	Chachoengsao Stadium	Chachoengsao, Thailand	Decision	5	3:00
1996-10-26	Win	(Thailand) Sakmongkol Sithchuchok	Beer Chang Tournament, Final	Bangkok, Thailand	Decision	5	3:00
Wins the Beer Chang Super Featherweight (140lbs) Tournament title.
1996-09-28	Win	(Thailand) Wanlop Sor.Sathaphan	Lumpinee Stadium Beer Chang Tournament, Semi-final	Bangkok, Thailand	Decision	5	3:00
1996-08-24	Win	(Thailand) Namkabuan Nongkeepahuyuth	Lumpinee Stadium Beer Chang Tournament	Bangkok, Thailand	Decision	5	3:00
1996-07-20	Loss	(Thailand) Therdkiat Sitthepitak	Onesongchai, Phanom Rung Historical Park	Chaloem Phra Kiat, Thailand	KO (Right cross)	3	
1996-06-29	Loss	(Thailand) Sakmongkol Sithchuchok	Beer Chang Tournament	Bangkok, Thailand	Decision	5	3:00
1996-	Loss	(Thailand) Jongsanan Fairtex	Lumpinee Stadium Beer Chang Tournament	Bangkok, Thailand	Decision	5	3:00
1996-05-03	Loss	(Thailand) Sangtiennoi Sor.Rungroj	Lumpinee Stadium	Bangkok, Thailand	Decision	5	3:00
1996-03-06	Loss	(Thailand) Robert Kaennorasing	Rajadamnern Stadium	Bangkok, Thailand	Decision	5	3:00
1995-12-30	Loss	(Thailand) Sangtiennoi Sor.Rungroj	Lumpinee Stadium	Bangkok, Thailand			
1995-11-03	Win	(Thailand) Sangtiennoi Sor.Rungroj	Lumpinee Stadium	Bangkok, Thailand	Decision	5	3:00
1995-09-05	Loss	(Thailand) Sangtiennoi Sor.Rungroj	Lumpinee Stadium	Bangkok, Thailand	Decision	5	3:00
1995-06-07	Win	(Thailand) Kongnapa BM Service	Rajadamnern Stadium	Bangkok, Thailand	Decision	5	3:00
1995-04-28	Loss	(Thailand) Orono Por.MuangUbon	Lumpinee Stadium	Bangkok, Thailand	KO (throw)	4	
1995-02-28	NC	(Thailand) Therdkiat Sitthepitak	Lumpinee Stadium	Bangkok, Thailand	Ref.stop. (Therdkiat dismissed)	4	
1995-01-31	Win	(Thailand) Namkabuan Nongkeepahuyuth	Lumpinee Stadium	Bangkok, Thailand	Decision	5	3:00
1994-12-24	Loss	(Thailand) Orono Por.MuangUbon	Lumpinee Stadium	Bangkok, Thailand	Decision	5	3:00
Loses the Lumpinee Stadium Lightweight (135 lbs) title and fails to win the Asia Cement Tournament.
1994-11-19	Win	(Thailand) Jongsanan Fairtex	Lumpinee Stadium	Bangkok, Thailand	Decision	5	3:00
Wins the Lumpinee Stadium Lightweight (135 lbs) title.
1994-10-24	NC	(Thailand) Orono Por.MuangUbon	Rajadamnern Stadium	Bangkok, Thailand		5	3:00
Originally a decision win for Pairot. Overturned to a no contest after the gamblers rioted.
1994-06-11	Loss	(Thailand) Orono Por.MuangUbon	Lumpinee Stadium	Bangkok, Thailand	Decision	5	3:00
1994-04-22	Loss	(Thailand) Mathee Jadeepitak	Fairtex, Lumpinee Stadium	Bangkok, Thailand	Decision	5	3:00
1994-03-22	Win	(Thailand) Pomphet Naratreekul	Lumpinee Stadium	Bangkok, Thailand	Decision	5	3:00
1993-10-05	Loss	(Thailand) Namkabuan Nongkeepahuyuth	Lumpinee Stadium	Bangkok, Thailand	Decision	5	3:00
For the Lumpinee Stadium Super Featherweight (130 lbs) title.
1993-09-07	Win	(Thailand) Nuathoranee Thongracha	Lumpinee Stadium	Bangkok, Thailand	Decision	5	3:00
1993-08-25	Win	(Thailand) Chandet Sor.Prantalay	Lumpinee Stadium	Bangkok, Thailand	Decision	5	3:00
1993-07-11	Win	(Thailand) Cherry Sor.Wanich		Nakhon Sawan Province, Thailand	Decision	5	3:00
1993-05-07	Loss	(Thailand) Nuathoranee Thongracha	Lumpinee Stadium	Bangkok, Thailand	KO (Elbow & Knee)	3	
1993-04-06	Win	(Thailand) Orono Por.MuangUbon	Lumpinee Stadium	Bangkok, Thailand	Decision	5	3:00
1993-02-20	Win	(Thailand) Surin Phanyuthaphum	Lumpinee Stadium	Bangkok, Thailand	Decision	5	3:00
1992–10-10	Loss	(Thailand) Den Muangsurin	Rajadamnern Stadium	Bangkok, Thailand	KO (Punch)	4	
1992–	Win	(Thailand) Jirasak Por.Pongsawang	Rajadamnern Stadium	Bangkok, Thailand	Decision	5	3:00
1990-09-	Loss	(Thailand) Pichit Sitbangprachan	Lumpinee Stadium	Bangkok, Thailand	KO	3	
1990-05-21	Win	(Thailand) Pichit Sitbangprachan	Lumpinee Stadium	Bangkok, Thailand	Decision	5	3:00
1990-04-30	Win	(Thailand) Sakmongkol Sithchuchok	Rajadamnern Stadium	Bangkok, Thailand	Decision	5	3:00
1990-	Loss	(Thailand) Samranthong Kiatbanchong	Lumpinee Stadium	Bangkok, Thailand	Decision	5	3:00
1989-11-20	Win	(Thailand) Noenthong Singkiri	Rajadamnern Stadium	Bangkok, Thailand	Decision	5	3:00
1989-03-17	Win	(Thailand) Kukkong Fairtex	Rajadamnern Stadium	Bangkok, Thailand	Decision	5	3:00
1989-02-18	Win	(Thailand) Suratnoi Lukborai	Lumpinee Stadium	Bangkok, Thailand	Decision	5	3:00
Legend: Win Loss Draw/No contest Notes
