= Cherry Sor.Wanich =

Thai former professional Muay Thai fighter

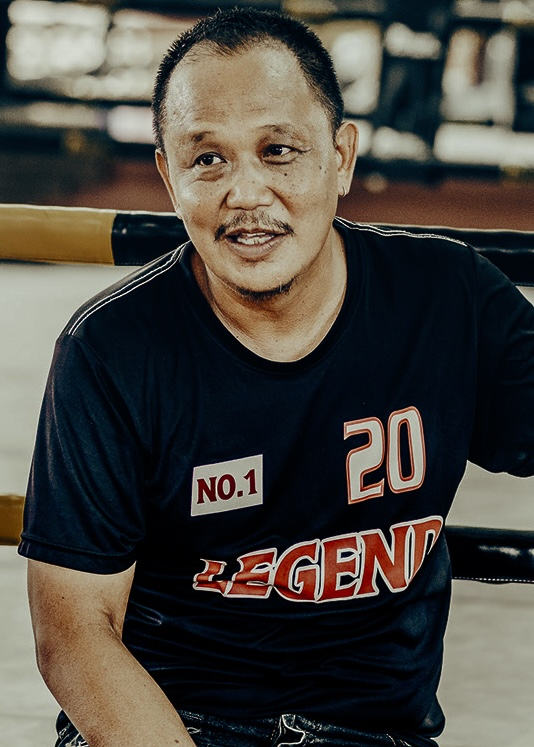
- Cherry in 2022
- Born: Suriyan Srikan; May 30, 1969; Nong Ruea, Khon Kaen, Thailand
- Native name: สุริยัน ศรีกัน
- Other names: Cherry Sitpornnimit (เชอรี่ ศิษย์พรนิมิตร); Cherry Sitjamee (เชอรี่ ศิษย์จ่ามี)
- Nickname: Black Shark (ฉลามดำ)
- Height: 171 cm (5 ft 7 in)
- Division: Super Featherweight; Lightweight; Super Lightweight
- Style: Muay Thai (Muay Khao)
- Stance: Orthodox
- Team: Sor.Wanich Gym; Sor.Sukonthip Gym
- Years active: c. 1981–1996

Suriyan Srikan (Thai: สุริยัน ศรีกัน; born May 30, 1969), known professionally as Cherry Sor.Wanich (Thai: เชอรี่ ส.วานิช), is a Thai former professional Muay Thai fighter. He is a former Lumpinee Stadium Super Featherweight Champion who was famous in the 1980s and 1990s. Nicknamed the "Black Shark", he was especially known for his relentless pressure, clinch, and knees.

== Biography and career ==
Cherry started Muay Thai at the age of 12 fighting for various camps until the age of 17 when he joined the Sor wanich gym in Chonburi, he would spend the rest of his career there.

He was a popular fighter of the Bangkok circuit with purses going as high as 250,000 THB.

At his peak was 4 time Lumpinee Stadium Super Featherweight (130 lbs) champion.

After his retirement Cherry spent time in Macau working as a bodyguard.

== Titles and accomplishments ==
- Omnoi Stadium
  - 1988 Tiger Power XD-3 Tournament Winner
- Lumpinee Stadium
  - 1989 Lumpinee Stadium Super Featherweight (130 lbs) Champion
    - Four successful title defenses
- Awards
  - 1989 Sports Writers Association of Thailand Fight of the Year (vs Jaroenthong Kiatbanchong)

== Fight record ==
Muay Thai Record (Incomplete)
Date	Result	Opponent	Event	Location	Method	Round	Time
1996-08-17	Loss	(Thailand) Prabseuklek Sitnarong	Lumpinee Stadium	Bangkok, Thailand	Decision	5	3:00
1995-11-18	Loss	(Thailand) Kaoponglek Luksurathum		Bangkok, Thailand	Decision	5	3:00
1995–	Loss	(Thailand) Jongsanan Fairtex		Bangkok, Thailand	Decision	5	3:00
1995–	Loss	(Thailand) Jongsanan Fairtex		Bangkok, Thailand	Decision	5	3:00
1995–	Win	(Netherlands) Ramon Dekkers	Lumpinee Stadium	Bangkok, Thailand	Decision	5	3:00
1995-06-10	Loss	(Thailand) Chatchai Paiseetong	Lumpinee Stadium	Bangkok, Thailand	Decision	5	3:00
1995-05-23	Win	(Thailand) Den Muangsurin	Lumpinee Stadium	Bangkok, Thailand	Decision	5	3:00
1994-02-15	Loss	(Thailand) Orono Por.MuangUbon	Lumpinee Stadium	Bangkok, Thailand	Decision	5	3:00
1993-10-18	Loss	(Thailand) Mathee Jadeepitak	Lumpinee Stadium	Bangkok, Thailand	Decision	5	3:00
1993-09-11	Loss	(Thailand) Rittichai Lookmaesaithong	Lumpinee Stadium	Bangkok, Thailand	Decision	5	3:00
1993-08-13	Loss	(Thailand) Chotchai Chuchokchai	Lumpinee Stadium	Bangkok, Thailand	Decision	5	3:00
1993-07-11	Loss	(Thailand) Pairot Wor.Wolapon		Nakhon Sawan, Thailand	Decision	5	3:00
1993-04-30	Loss	(Thailand) Rittichai Lookmaesaithong	Lumpinee Stadium	Bangkok, Thailand	Decision	5	3:00
1993-03-04	Loss	(Thailand) Superlek Sornisaan	Lumpinee Stadium	Bangkok, Thailand	KO (Punches)	3	
1993-02-22	Win	(Thailand) Buakaw Por.Pisichet	Rajadamnern Stadium	Bangkok, Thailand	Decision	5	3:00
1993-01-29	Loss	(Thailand) Chandet Sor.Prantalay	Lumpinee Stadium	Bangkok, Thailand	Decision	5	3:00
1993-01-08	Win	(Thailand) Orono Por.MuangUbon	Lumpinee Stadium	Bangkok, Thailand	Decision	5	3:00
1992-11-30	Loss	(Thailand) Superlek Sornisaan	Lumpinee Stadium	Bangkok, Thailand	KO (Punches)	3	
1992-10-13	Loss	(Thailand) Therdkiat Sitthepitak	Lumpinee Stadium	Bangkok, Thailand	Decision	5	3:00
1992-09-25	Win	(Thailand) Jaroenthong Kiatbanchong	Lumpinee Stadium	Bangkok, Thailand	Decision	5	3:00
1992-08-	Loss	(Thailand) Sakmongkol Sithchuchok	Lumpinee Stadium	Bangkok, Thailand	Decision	5	3:00
1992-07-07	Loss	(Thailand) Sangtiennoi Sor.Rungroj	Lumpinee Stadium	Bangkok, Thailand	Decision	5	3:00
1992-06-09	Win	(Thailand) Chandet Sor.Prantalay	Lumpinee Stadium	Bangkok, Thailand	Decision	5	3:00
1992-04-07	Loss	(Thailand) Wangchannoi Sor.Palangchai	Lumpinee Stadium	Bangkok, Thailand	KO (Right Uppercut)	2	
1992-03-10	Win	(Thailand) Oley Kiatoneway	Lumpinee Stadium	Bangkok, Thailand	KO (Knees)	4	
1992-02-21	Win	(Thailand) Orono Por.MuangUbon	Lumpinee Stadium	Bangkok, Thailand	Decision	5	3:00
1992-01-21	Loss	(Thailand) Sakmongkol Sithchuchok	Lumpinee Stadium	Bangkok, Thailand	Decision	5	3:00
1992-01-07	Loss	(Thailand) Sangtiennoi Sor.Rungroj	Lumpinee Stadium	Bangkok, Thailand	Decision	5	3:00
1991-12-	Loss	(Thailand) Jongsanan Luklongbankaew	Lumpinee Stadium	Bangkok, Thailand	Decision	5	3:00
1991-10-25	Win	(Thailand) Boonlai Sor.Thanikul	Lumpinee Stadium	Bangkok, Thailand	Decision	5	3:00
1991-09-24	Loss	(Thailand) Jongsanan Luklongbankaew	Lumpinee Stadium	Bangkok, Thailand	Decision	5	3:00
1991-09-03	Loss	(Thailand) Wangchannoi Sor.Palangchai	Lumpinee Stadium	Bangkok, Thailand	Decision	5	3:00
1991-05-31	Loss	(Thailand) Namkabuan Nongkeepahuyuth	Lumpinee Stadium	Bangkok, Thailand	Decision	5	3:00
Loses the Lumpinee Stadium Super Featherweight (130 lbs) title.
1991-02-15	Win	(Thailand) Panomrunglek Chor.Sawat	Muangchai Kittikasem vs Sot Chitalada	Ayutthaya, Thailand	Decision	5	3:00
1991-01-04	Loss	(Thailand) Sangtiennoi Sor.Rungroj	Lumpinee Stadium	Bangkok, Thailand	KO (Knee to the Head)	3	
For the Yodmuaythai trophy.
1990-11-27	Loss	(Thailand) Superlek Sornisaan	Lumpinee Stadium	Bangkok, Thailand	KO (Right Cross)	5	
1990-10-30	Win	(Thailand) Therdkiat Sitthepitak	Lumpinee Stadium	Bangkok, Thailand	Decision	5	3:00
1990-10-12	Win	(Thailand) Superlek Sornisaan	Lumpinee Stadium	Bangkok, Thailand	Decision	5	3:00
1990-08-31	Win	(Thailand) Therdkiat Sitthepitak	Lumpinee Stadium	Bangkok, Thailand	Decision	5	3:00
Defends the Lumpinee Stadium Super Featherweight (130 lbs) title.
1990-07-29	Win	(Thailand) Jaroenthong Kiatbanchong		Arizona, United States	Decision	5	3:00
1990-06-29	Draw	(Thailand) Jaroenthong Kiatbanchong	Lumpinee Stadium	Bangkok, Thailand	Decision	5	3:00
1990-05-27	Loss	(Netherlands) Ramon Dekkers	Muay Thai vs. Europe, Jaap Eden Hall	Amsterdam, Netherlands	KO (Left Hook)	1	
1990-04-24	Win	(Thailand) Petchdam Lukborai	Lumpinee Stadium	Bangkok, Thailand	Decision	5	3:00
1990-03-30	Win	(Thailand) Superlek Sornisaan	Lumpinee Stadium	Bangkok, Thailand	TKO (Knees)	4	
Defends the Lumpinee Stadium Super Featherweight (130 lbs) title.
1990-02-06	Win	(Thailand) Namphon Nongkeepahuyuth	Lumpinee Stadium	Bangkok, Thailand	Decision	5	3:00
1990-01-19	Draw	(Thailand) Namphon Nongkeepahuyuth	Lumpinee Stadium	Bangkok, Thailand	Decision	5	3:00
Defends the Lumpinee Stadium Super Featherweight (130 lbs) title.
1989-12-31	Win	(France) Jo Prestia (France) Joel Cesar	2 vs 1	Paris, France	Decision	5	3:00
Jo Prestia fought the first three rounds and Joel Cesar the last two.
1989-11-28	Draw	(Thailand) Namphon Nongkeepahuyuth	Lumpinee Stadium	Bangkok, Thailand	Decision	5	3:00
1989-11-07	Draw	(Thailand) Namphon Nongkeepahuyuth	Lumpinee Stadium	Bangkok, Thailand	Decision	5	3:00
1989-10-06	Win	(Thailand) Saencherng Pinsinchai	Lumpinee Stadium	Bangkok, Thailand	Decision	5	3:00
Defends the Lumpinee Stadium Super Featherweight (130 lbs) title.
1989-08-15	Loss	(Thailand) Jaroenthong Kiatbanchong	Lumpinee Stadium	Bangkok, Thailand	Decision	5	3:00
1989-07-25	Win	(Thailand) Saencherng Pinsinchai	Lumpinee Stadium	Bangkok, Thailand	Decision	5	3:00
Wins Lumpinee Stadium Super Featherweight (130 lbs) title.
1989-06-26	Win	(Thailand) Namphon Nongkeepahuyuth	Rajadamnern Stadium	Bangkok, Thailand	Decision	5	3:00
1989-05-30	Win	(Thailand) Chanchai Sor.Tamarangsri	Lumpinee Stadium	Bangkok, Thailand	Decision	5	3:00
1989-05-12	Win	(Thailand) Samransak Muangsurin	Lumpinee Stadium	Bangkok, Thailand	Decision	5	3:00
1989-04-07	Draw	(Thailand) Samransak Muangsurin	Lumpinee Stadium	Bangkok, Thailand	Decision	5	3:00
1989-03-10	Draw	(Thailand) Dokmaipa Por.Pongsawang	Lumpinee Stadium	Bangkok, Thailand	Decision	5	3:00
1989-02-21	Win	(Thailand) Sanphet Lukrangesee	Lumpinee Stadium	Bangkok, Thailand	Decision	5	3:00
1989-01-31	Draw	(Thailand) Sanphet Lukrangesee	Ratchaburi Provincial Stadium	Ratchaburi, Thailand	Decision	5	3:00
1988-12-17	Win	(Thailand) Boonchai Tor.Thuwanon	Omnoi Stadium – Tiger Power XD-3 Tournament Final	Samut Sakhon, Thailand	Decision	5	3:00
Wins the Tiger Power XD-3 Tournament.
1988-11-05	Win	(Thailand) Laonoi Siyodtong	Omnoi Stadium – Tiger Power XD-3 Tournament Semi Final	Samut Sakhon, Thailand	Decision	5	3:00
1988-10-08	Win	(Thailand) Rak Sakdiprasang	Omnoi Stadium – Tiger Power XD-3 Tournament	Samut Sakhon, Thailand	KO		
1988-09-03	Win	(Thailand) Ratchaput Sor.Thanikul	Omnoi Stadium – Tiger Power XD-3 Tournament	Samut Sakhon, Thailand	Decision	5	3:00
1988-08-06	Win	(Thailand) Kanongsuk Sitomnoi	Omnoi Stadium – Tiger Power XD-3 Tournament	Samut Sakhon, Thailand	Decision	5	3:00
1988-01-26	Loss	(Thailand) Bangsaen Tor.Khotchasan	Lumpinee Stadium	Bangkok, Thailand	KO (Punches)	2	
1988-01-08	Win	(Thailand) Daothongnoi Sitdaothong	Rajadamnern Stadium	Bangkok, Thailand	Decision	5	3:00
1987-10-19	Loss	(Thailand) Sanphet Lukrangesee	Rajadamnern Stadium	Bangkok, Thailand	Decision	5	3:00
1987-09-22	Win	(Thailand) Daothongnoi Sitdaothong	Lumpinee Stadium	Bangkok, Thailand	Decision	5	3:00
1987-06-22	Win	(Thailand) Bangkhlanoi Sor.Thanikul	30th Anniversary, Chanthaburi Stadium	Chanthaburi, Thailand	Decision	5	3:00
1987-02-07	Win	(Thailand) Chalermsak Chor.Sriprasert	Lumpinee Stadium	Bangkok, Thailand	Decision	5	3:00
1986-03-28	Loss	(Thailand) Aitoising Atthapol	Rajadamnern Stadium	Bangkok, Thailand	KO	2	
Legend: Win Loss Draw/No contest Notes
