= Boonlai Sor.Thanikul =

Thai former professional Muay Thai fighter

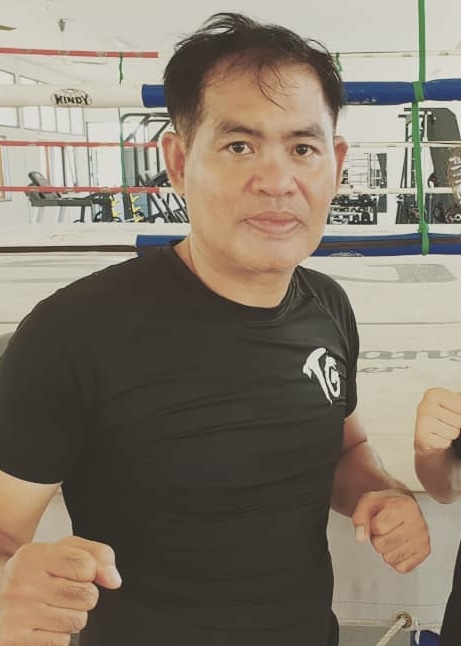
- Boonlai in 2019
- Born: Chaichan Ramoon; November 16, 1970 (age 56); Bang Nam Priao, Chachoengsao, Thailand
- Native name: ชัยชาญ รามูน
- Other names: Wangyu Sor.Ploenchit (1984-1986)
- Nickname: The Iron Twin (Faet Lek)
- Height: 168 cm (5 ft 6 in)
- Division: Super Flyweight; Super Bantamweight; Featherweight
- Style: Muay Thai (Muay Femur)
- Stance: Orthodox
- Team: Sitmabon (until 1984); Sor.Ploenchit (1984-1986); Sor.Thanikul (1986-1994); Sor.Korpilap (founded 2010); 11th Infantry Military Base
- Trainer: Phairaj Lawiraj (Pueng Sor.Thanikul)

Other information
- Occupation: Muay Thai trainer
- Notable relatives: Boonlong Sor.Thanikul (twin brother)

Chaichan Ramoon (Thai: ชัยชาญ รามูน; born: November 11, 1970), known professionally as Boonlai Sor.Thanikul (Thai: บุญหลาย ส.ธนิกุล), is a Thai former professional Muay Thai fighter. He is a former two-division Lumpinee Stadium champion who was famous in the 1980s and 1990s. He is respected as one of the most skilled fighters of the Muay Thai golden era who fought a wide variety of opponents.

He won both of his Lumpinee Stadium titles against "The Wonder Boy" Karuhat Sor.Supawan and "Mr. Merciless Knee" Langsuan Panyuthaphum and defended them both against Oley Kiatoneway.

== Biography and career ==
=== Early life ===
Ramoon and his twin brother were born into a poor family living in Chachoengsao province on November 16, 1970. At the age of 10, the twins started training Muay Thai at home with their father. They later joined the small Sitmabon gym near their home. After Ramoon fought out of Sitmabon around 50 times, the twins were found by a talent scout from Bangkok and were transferred to the Sor.Ploenchit gym at 13-years-old. Ramoon then used the ring name of Wangyu Sor.Ploenchit. After 2 years of fighting out of the millionaire-owned elite gym, the twins were given to the mafia-owned Sor.Thanikul gym in 1986 as a way for their boss to clear a gambling debt. The twins would adopt the ring names Boonlai and Boonlong Sor.Thanikul and made the rest of their careers fighting out of their new gym.

Despite the fact that the Sor.Thanikul gym was owned by notorious mafia godfather Klaew Thanikul, who was responsible for murder, drug trade, human trafficking, et cetera, Thanikul treated his gym's fighters well and gave them large sums of money. The Sor.Thanikul gym was unusually large and had higher quality training equipment compared to most Thai gyms of the time. Like the other fighters in the gym, the twins trained everyday under headman Pueng Sor.Thanikul in what was considered one of the best Muay Thai gyms in Thailand which produced a total of around 20 champions in the Lumpinee and Rajadamnern stadiums.

=== Elite career ===
Boonlai and Boonlong would go on to be the most famous fighters in the Sor.Thanikul gym's history. They would fight under the Onesongchai promotion. In 1989, Boonlai would defeat an elite fighter who the Thai audiences considered a superstar at the time, Karuhat Sor.Supawan. On the same card, Boonlong defeated the renowned pressure fighter Pongsiri "Rambo" Sor. Ruamrudee. Boonlai would face "The Top Master" Karuhat a total of 4 times with Boonlai defeating him in 3 bouts. Karuhat would later cite Boonlai as his most difficult opponent, admitting Boonlai's technicality and height as the reasons why. Oley Kiatoneway cited his first bout against Boonlai as his most painful fight, as Oley was winning on points until Boonlai darted forward with a right cross and knocked down Oley with a series of punches. Oley suffered from a headache after the knockdown and had to be hospitalized. Boonlai won the fight to successfully defend his 115 lbs Lumpinee title that he won for defeating "The Heartless Knee Striker" Langsuan Panyuthaphum.

Boonlai found success with the rope-a-dope style, and at the peak of his career received purses as high as ฿200,000 (equivalent to ฿396,935 in 2020). Boonlai beat a wide range of prominent fighters, including Langsuan Panyuthaphum, Namkabuan Nongkeepahuyuth, Jongsanan Fairtex, Wangchannoi Sor Palangchai, Jaroensap Kiatbanchong, and Somrak Khamsing, but stated that his victory against "The Ring Genius" Namkabuan was his favorite memory, due to Namkabuan's top ranking at the time. Boonlai named Namkabuan and Somrak as the most difficult opponents he ever faced.

Boonlai's final matchup was against Silapathai Jockygym. After it was observed that Boonlai was not performing to the best of his ability, Silapathai threw a question mark kick at his head followed it with a series of punches, knocking Boonlai out. Suspicion grew as Boonlai fell after receiving weak punches, and an investigation concluded that Boonlai faked the KO to intentionally lose the fight. Boonlai was supposedly banned from competition afterward. Despite this, Boonlai is remembered as one of the most talented fighters of the 1990s.

In Thailand, Boonlai is one of the few Muay Thai fighters who is said to have "fought everyone" as in he was matched up against an unusually wide array of elite fighters during his prime.

=== Later years ===
After his Muay Thai career, Boonlai became a trainer in various camps in Bangkok as well as opening his own gym called Sor.Korpilap in 2010. His twin brother Boonlong died from a car accident. Boonlai was also a Muay Thai coach for the 11th Infantry Military Base in Chachoengsao province.

== Titles and honours ==
- Lumpinee Stadium
  - 1990 Lumpinee Stadium Super Flyweight (115 lbs) Champion
    - One successful title defense
  - 1992 Lumpinee Stadium Super Bantamweight (122 lbs) Champion
    - One successful title defense

== Fight record ==
Muay Thai Record
300 Wins, 95 Losses, 5 Draws
| Date | Result | Opponent | Event | Location | Method | Round | Time |
| 2024-01-20 | Loss | (Thailand) Rotnarong Daopadriew | Wor. Watthana Muay Ying | Buriram province, Thailand | KO (Sweep) | 2 | |
| 1994-09-28 | Loss | (Thailand) Silapathai Jockygym | Rajadamnern Stadium | Bangkok, Thailand | KO (High kick + punches) | 2 | |
| 1994-08-08 | Win | (Thailand) Lamnamoon Sor.Sumalee | Rajadamnern Stadium | Bangkok, Thailand | KO (Punches) | 3 | |
| 1994-05-27 | Loss | (Thailand) Wangchannoi Sor.Palangchai | Lumpinee Stadium | Bangkok, Thailand | Decision | 5 | 3:00 |
| 1994-04-29 | Win | (Thailand) Chatchai Paiseetong | Lumpinee Stadium | Bangkok, Thailand | Decision | 5 | 3:00 |
| 1994-03-25 | Win | (Thailand) Lamnamoon Sor.Sumalee | Lumpinee Stadium | Bangkok, Thailand | KO (Uppercut + left hook) | 2 | |
| 1994-02-13 | Loss | (Thailand) Karuhat Sor.Supawan | | Chachoengsao, Thailand | Decision | 5 | 3:00 |
For the Lumpinee Stadium Super Bantamweight (122 lbs) title.
| 1994-01-07 | Win | (Thailand) Pompetch Naratreekul | Lumpinee Stadium | Bangkok, Thailand | Decision | 5 | 3:00 |
| 1993-10-22 | Loss | (Thailand) Rittichai Lookchaomaesaithong | Lumpinee Stadium | Bangkok, Thailand | KO (Right high kick) | 2 | |
| 1993-08-31 | Loss | (Thailand) Chatchai Paiseetong | Lumpinee Stadium | Bangkok, Thailand | Decision | 5 | 3:00 |
Loses the Lumpinee Stadium Super Bantamweight (122 lbs) title.
| 1993-08-06 | Loss | (Thailand) Namkabuan Nongkeepahuyuth | Lumpinee Stadium | Bangkok, Thailand | Decision | 5 | 3:00 |
| 1993-07-11 | Loss | (Thailand) Oley Kiatoneway | OneSongchai | Nakhon Sawan, Thailand | Decision | 5 | 3:00 |
| 1993-05-07 | Win | (Thailand) Karuhat Sor.Supawan | Lumpinee Stadium | Bangkok, Thailand | Decision | 5 | 3:00 |
| 1993-04-06 | Win | (Thailand) Jaroensap Kiatbanchong | Lumpinee Stadium | Bangkok, Thailand | Decision | 5 | 3:00 |
| 1993-02-15 | Draw | (Thailand) Superlek Sornisaan | Rajadamnern Stadium | Bangkok, Thailand | Decision | 5 | 3:00 |
| 1992-12-30 | Win | (Thailand) Chamuekpet Hapalang | Rajadamnern Stadium | Bangkok, Thailand | Decision | 5 | 3:00 |
| 1992-11-20 | Loss | (Thailand) Namkabuan Nongkeepahuyuth | Lumpinee Stadium | Bangkok, Thailand | Decision | 5 | 3:00 |
| 1992-10-13 | Win | (Thailand) Oley Kiatoneway | OneSongchai, Lumpinee Stadium | Bangkok, Thailand | Decision | 5 | 3:00 |
Defends the Lumpinee Stadium Super Bantamweight (122 lbs) title.
| 1992-09-11 | Loss | (Thailand) Nuathoranee Thongracha | Lumpinee Stadium | Bangkok, Thailand | Decision | 5 | 3:00 |
| 1992-07-21 | Win | (Thailand) Nungubon Sitlerchai | Lumpinee Stadium | Bangkok, Thailand | Decision | 5 | 3:00 |
| 1992-06-30 | Win | (Thailand) Oley Kiatoneway | Lumpinee Stadium | Bangkok, Thailand | Decision | 5 | 3:00 |
| 1992-05-29 | Win | (Thailand) Jongsanan Fairtex | Lumpinee Stadium | Bangkok, Thailand | Decision | 5 | 3:00 |
| 1992-04-24 | Loss | (Thailand) Nuathroanee Thongracha | Lumpinee Stadium | Bangkok, Thailand | Decision | 5 | 3:00 |
| 1992-03-10 | Win | (Thailand) Namkabuan Nongkeepahuyuth | Lumpinee Stadium | Bangkok, Thailand | Decision | 5 | 3:00 |
| 1992-01-31 | Win | (Thailand) Wangchannoi Sor.Palangchai | Lumpinee Stadium | Bangkok, Thailand | Decision | 5 | 3:00 |
Wins the Lumpinee Stadium Super Bantamweight (122 lbs) title.
| 1991-12-27 | Win | (Thailand) Superlek Sornisaan | Lumpinee Stadium | Bangkok, Thailand | Decision | 5 | 3:00 |
| 1991-11-26 | Win | (Thailand) Thanooin Chor.Chuchart | Lumpinee Stadium | Bangkok, Thailand | Decision | 5 | 3:00 |
| 1991-10-25 | Loss | (Thailand) Cherry Sor.Wanich | Lumpinee Stadium | Bangkok, Thailand | Decision | 5 | 3:00 |
| 1991-09-24 | Win | (Thailand) Dokmaipa Por.Pongsawang | Lumpinee Stadium | Bangkok, Thailand | Decision | 5 | 3:00 |
| 1991-09-03 | Draw | (Thailand) Jongsanan Fairtex | Lumpinee Stadium | Bangkok, Thailand | Decision | 5 | 3:00 |
| 1991-07-30 | Loss | (Thailand) Jirasak Keatsamanwit | Lumpinee Stadium | Bangkok, Thailand | Decision | 5 | 3:00 |
| 1991-06-28 | Win | (Thailand) Samranthong Kiatbanchong | Lumpinee Stadium | Bangkok, Thailand | Decision | 5 | 3:00 |
| 1991-06-11 | Loss | (Thailand) Pimaranlek Sitaran | Lumpinee Stadium | Bangkok, Thailand | Decision | 5 | 3:00 |
| 1991-05-17 | Loss | (Thailand) Pimaranlek Sitaran | Lumpinee Stadium | Bangkok, Thailand | Decision | 5 | 3:00 |
| 1991-04-07 | Win | (Thailand) Wanghin Por.Chaiwat | Central Boxing Stadium | Samut Songkhram, Thailand | Decision | 5 | 3:00 |
| 1991-03-22 | Win | (Thailand) Samranthong Kiatbanchong | Lumpinee Stadium | Bangkok, Thailand | Decision | 5 | 3:00 |
| 1991-01-20 | Loss | (Thailand) Panomrung Sit Sor.Wor.Por | Pantip Plaza Boxing Stadium | Bangkok, Thailand | Decision | 5 | 3:00 |
| 1990-12-26 | Win | (Thailand) Grandprixnoi Muangchaiyaphum | Lumpinee Stadium | Bangkok, Thailand | Decision | 5 | 3:00 |
| 1990-11-27 | Win | (Thailand) Karuhat Sor.Supawan | Lumpinee Stadium | Bangkok, Thailand | Decision | 5 | 3:00 |
| 1990-10-26 | Loss | (Thailand) Pimaranlek Sitaran | Lumpinee Stadium | Bangkok, Thailand | Decision | 5 | 3:00 |
| 1990-09-19 | Win | (Thailand) Boonam Chor.Waikul | Rajadamnern Stadium | Bangkok, Thailand | Decision | 5 | 3:00 |
| 1990-08-07 | Win | (Thailand) Pimaranlek Sitaran | Lumpinee Stadium | Bangkok, Thailand | Decision | 5 | 3:00 |
| 1990-06-08 | Loss | (Thailand) Oley Kiatoneway | Lumpinee Stadium | Bangkok, Thailand | Decision | 5 | 3:00 |
Loses the Lumpinee Stadium Super Flyweight (115 lbs) title.
| 1990-05-15 | Loss | (Thailand) Dokmaipa Por.Pongsawang | Lumpinee Stadium | Bangkok, Thailand | Decision | 5 | 3:00 |
| 1990-04-24 | Win | (Thailand) Oley Kiatoneway | OneSongchai, Lumpinee Stadium | Bangkok, Thailand | Decision | 5 | 3:00 |
Defends the Lumpinee Stadium Super Flyweight (115 lbs) title.
| 1990-03-02 | Loss | (Thailand) Kangwannoi Or.Sribualoi | Lumpinee Stadium | Bangkok, Thailand | Decision | 5 | 3:00 |
| 1990-02-06 | Win | (Thailand) Kangwannoi Or.Sribualoi | Lumpinee Stadium | Bangkok, Thailand | Decision | 5 | 3:00 |
| 1990-01-19 | Win | (Thailand) Langsuan Panyuthaphum | Lumpinee Stadium | Bangkok, Thailand | Decision | 5 | 3:00 |
Wins the Lumpinee Stadium Super Flyweight (115 lbs) title.
| 1989-12-08 | Draw | (Thailand) Grandprixnnoi Muangchaiyapoom | Lumpinee Stadium | Bangkok, Thailand | Decision | 5 | 3:00 |
| 1989-11-07 | Win | (Thailand) Noppadet Sor.Rewadee | Lumpinee Stadium | Bangkok, Thailand | Decision | 5 | 3:00 |
| 1989-10-20 | Win | (Thailand) Panphet Muangsurin | Rajadamnern Stadium | Bangkok, Thailand | Decision | 5 | 3:00 |
| 1989-08-28 | Win | (Thailand) Karuhat Sor.Supawan | Lumpinee Stadium | Bangkok, Thailand | Decision | 5 | 3:00 |
| 1989-07-25 | Win | (Thailand) Seesot Sahakanohsot | Lumpinee Stadium | Bangkok, Thailand | Decision | 5 | 3:00 |
| 1988- | Win | (Thailand) Daoden Sor.Sukkasem | Rajadamnern Stadium | Bangkok, Thailand | Decision | 5 | 3:00 |
Legend: Win Loss Draw/No contest Notes
