= Superlek Sornisaan =

Thai professional Muay Thai fighter (1969-2013)

- Superlek in the 1990s
- Born: Mekhin Khaosri; March 21, 1969; Mueang Ubon Ratchathani, Ubon Ratchathani, Thailand
- Died: April 22, 2013 (aged 44)
- Native name: ซุปเปอร์เล็ก ศรีอีสาน
- Other names: Superlek Chor.Sawat (ซุปเปอร์เล็ก ช.สวัสดิ์)
- Nickname: Remote Puncher (ไอ้หมัดรีโมท); Mr. Eight Hundred Thousand (บักแปดแสน)
- Height: 1.68 m (5 ft 6 in)
- Division: Super Bantamweight; Featherweight
- Style: Muay Thai (Muay Bouk / Muay Mat)
- Stance: Orthodox
- Team: Sakon Sae-lor Gym; Sor.Sumalee Gym
- Years active: c. 1980s–1990s

Other information
- Notable relatives: Padsaenlek Rachanon (son)

Mekhin Khaosri (Thai: เมฆินทร์ ขาวศรี; March 21, 1969 - April 22, 2013), known professionally as Superlek Sornisaan (Thai: ซุปเปอร์เล็ก ศรอีสาน), was a Thai professional Muay Thai fighter. He was a two-weight Lumpinee Stadium champion who was famous during the 1980s and 1990s.

== Biography & career ==
Superlek was born in Ubon Ratchathani province, Isan (northeastern region of Thailand), he was well known for being a heavy puncher, as he often defeats his opponents by knockout with punches, which earned him the nickname "Remote Puncher". He had been praised for his heavy punches which have been compared to the likes former fighter, Danchai "White Tiger" Yontarakit.

He fought with numerous famous fighters in the same era such as Wangchannoi Sor.Palangchai, Jaroenthong Kiatbanchong, Oley Kiatoneway, Cherry Sor Wanich, Namkabuan Nongkeepahuyuth, Therdkiat Sitthepitak, Chanchai Sor.Tamarangsri, Dokmaipa Por.Pongsawang, Petchdam Lukborai, Namphon Nongkeepahuyuth, Jongsanan Fairtex, Mathee Jadeepitak, Nuathoranee Thongracha, Chandet Sor.Prantalay, and Sangtiennoi Sor.Rungroj. He was also known for his thrilling fight against the legendary Dutch kickboxer Ramon Dekkers on August 31, 1990 at Lumpinee Stadium organized by Songchai Rattanasuban, a famous promoter, the result was by points decision win after five rounds. His highest earned purse was 250,000 baht.

After retirement, he owned a stone crushing plant with dozens of trucks. His son was also a fighter under Vichairachanon Khadpo's stable named Padsaenlek Sor.Sumalee or Padsaenlek Rachanon.

He died of sepsis and alcoholism at 44 years old in April 2013.

== Titles ==
- Lumpinee Stadium
  - 1990 Lumpinee Stadium Super Bantamweight (122 lbs) Champion
  - 1993 Lumpinee Stadium Featherweight (126 lbs) Champion

== Fight record ==
Muay Thai Record (Incomplete)
Date	Result	Opponent	Event	Location	Method	Round	Time
1998-	Win	(Australia) John Wayne Parr	Songchai Promotion	Thailand	KO (Right Cross)	4	
1997-12-05	Win	(France) Manu N'toh	King's Birthday	Bangkok, Thailand	Decision	5	3:00
1997-10-	Loss	(Thailand) Thongchailek Tor.Silachai	Samrong Stadium	Samut Prakan, Thailand	Decision	5	3:00
1996-02-27	Loss	(Thailand) Keng Singnakonkhui	Lumpinee Stadium	Bangkok, Thailand	Decision	5	3:00
1995-10-13	Win	(Thailand) Jaroenwit Tor.Chalermchai	Lumpinee Stadium	Bangkok, Thailand	KO (Punches)		
1994-10-04	Win	(Thailand) Wanlop Sor.Thepthong	Lumpinee Stadium	Bangkok, Thailand	KO (Punches)	1	
1994-09-17	Loss	(Thailand) Den Muangsurin	Lumpinee Stadium	Bangkok, Thailand	Decision	5	3:00
1994-09-12	Win	(Thailand) Chandet Sor.Prantalay	Lumpinee Stadium	Bangkok, Thailand	KO (Right Cross)	3	
1994-08-22	Loss	(Thailand) Chotchoi Chuchokchai	Rajadamnern Stadium	Bangkok, Thailand	Decision	5	3:00
1994-07-25	Win	(Thailand) Taweechai Wor.Preecha	Rajadamnern Stadium	Bangkok, Thailand	Decision	5	3:00
1994-05-31		(Thailand) Wanlop Sor.Thepthong	Lumpinee Stadium	Bangkok, Thailand			
1994-04-29	Loss	(Thailand) Rainbow Sor.Prantalay	Lumpinee Stadium	Bangkok, Thailand	Decision	5	3:00
1994-01-31	Win	(Thailand) Ritthichai Lookchaomaesaitong	Rajadamnern Stadium	Bangkok, Thailand	Decision	5	3:00
1994-01-14	Win	(Thailand) Jaroenthong Kiatbanchong	Lumpinee Stadium	Bangkok, Thailand	Decision	5	3:00
1993-12-25	Win	(Thailand) Den Muangsurin	Lumpinee Stadium	Bangkok, Thailand	Decision	5	3:00
1993-06-08	Win	(Thailand) Mathee Jadeepitak	Lumpinee Stadium	Bangkok, Thailand	Decision	5	3:00
1993-04-24	Loss	(Thailand) Oley Kiatoneway	Lumpinee Stadium	Bangkok, Thailand	Decision	5	3:00
1993-04-06	Loss	(Thailand) Jongsanan Luklangbangkaew	Lumpinee Stadium	Bangkok, Thailand	Decision	5	3:00
For the Lumpinee Stadium Featherweight (126 lbs) title.
1993-03-10	Win	(Thailand) Nuengsiam Kiatwichian	Rajadamnern Stadium	Bangkok, Thailand	TKO (Punches)	2	
1993-02-15	Draw	(Thailand) Boonlai Sor.Thanikul	Rajadamnern Stadium	Bangkok, Thailand	Decision	5	3:00
1992-12-29	Win	(Thailand) Nuathoranee Thongracha	Lumpinee Stadium	Bangkok, Thailand	TKO (Doctor Stoppage)	4	
1992-11-30	Win	(Thailand) Cherry Sor.Wanich	Rajadamnern Stadium	Bangkok, Thailand	KO (Punches)	3	
1992-09-12	Win	(Thailand) Chandet Sor.Prantalay	Lumpinee Stadium	Bangkok, Thailand	KO	3	
1992-08-07	Win	(Thailand) Namphon Nongkeepahuyuth	Lumpinee Stadium	Bangkok, Thailand	KO	4	
1992-07-21	Win	(Thailand) Oley Kiatoneway	Lumpinee Stadium	Bangkok, Thailand	KO (Punches)	3	
1992-05-30	Win	(Thailand) Coban Lookchaomaesaitong	Lumpinee Stadium	Bangkok, Thailand	Decision	5	3:00
1992-04-24	Loss	(Thailand) Chandet Sor.Prantalay	Lumpinee Stadium	Bangkok, Thailand	Decision	5	3:00
1992-03-28	Win	(Thailand) Prabphairi Sitprapom	Lumpinee Stadium	Bangkok, Thailand	KO	1	
1992-02-28	Loss	(Thailand) Ritthichai Lookchaomaesaitong		Samut Prakan, Thailand	Decision	5	3:00
1991-12-27	Loss	(Thailand) Boonlai Sor.Thanikul	Lumpinee Stadium	Bangkok, Thailand	Decision	5	3:00
1991-11-03	Loss	(Thailand) Jaroenthong Kiatbanchong	Onesongchai	New Zealand	Decision	5	3:00
1991-09-27	Win	(Thailand) Samingnoi Tankaphan	Lumpinee Stadium	Bangkok, Thailand	KO (Punches)	3	
1991-08-17	Loss	(Thailand) Sanit Wichitkriengkrai	Lumpinee Stadium	Bangkok, Thailand	Decision	5	3:00
1991-07-30	Win	(Thailand) Namphon Nongkeepahuyuth	Lumpinee Stadium	Bangkok, Thailand	Decision	5	3:00
1991-06-14	Loss	(Thailand) Wangchannoi Sor.Palangchai	Lumpinee Stadium	Bangkok, Thailand	Decision	5	3:00
For the vacant Lumpinee Stadium Super Bantamweight (122 lbs) title.
1991-05-10	Loss	(Thailand) Petchdam Sityodtong	Lumpinee Stadium	Bangkok, Thailand	Decision	5	3:00
For a 1 million baht side-bet.
1991-03-29	Win	(Thailand) Namphon Nongkeepahuyuth	Lumpinee Stadium	Bangkok, Thailand	Decision	5	3:00
1991-02-15	Loss	(Thailand) Sangtiennoi Sor.Rungroj		Phra Nakhon Si Ayutthaya, Thailand	Decision	5	3:00
1990-12-18	Loss	(Thailand) Wangchannoi Sor.Palangchai	Lumpinee Stadium	Bangkok, Thailand	Decision	5	3:00
1990-11-27	Win	(Thailand) Cherry Sor.Wanich	Lumpinee Stadium	Bangkok, Thailand	KO (Punches)	5	
1990-10-12	Loss	(Thailand) Cherry Sor.Wanich	Lumpinee Stadium	Bangkok, Thailand	Decision	5	3:00
1990-08-31	Win	(Netherlands) Ramon Dekkers	Lumpinee Stadium	Bangkok, Thailand	Decision	5	3:00
1990-08-07	Win	(Thailand) Wangchannoi Sor.Palangchai	Lumpinee Stadium	Bangkok, Thailand	Decision	5	3:00
Wins the vacant Lumpinee Stadium Super Bantamweight (122 lbs) title.
1990-06-29	Win	(Thailand) Namphon Nongkeepahuyuth	Lumpinee Stadium	Bangkok, Thailand	Decision	5	3:00
1990-05-27	Win	(Netherlands) Joao Vieira		Netherlands	Decision	5	3:00
1990-03-30	Loss	(Thailand) Cherry Sor.Wanich	Lumpinee Stadium	Bangkok, Thailand	TKO (Knees)	4	
1990-03-06	Win	(Thailand) Jaroenthong Kiatbanchong	Lumpinee Stadium	Bangkok, Thailand	TKO (Punches)	3	
1990-02-06	Win	(Thailand) Chanchai Sor.Tamarangsri	Lumpinee Stadium	Bangkok, Thailand	Decision	5	3:00
1990-01-16	Win	(Thailand) Grandprixnoi Muangchaiyaphum	Lumpinee Stadium	Bangkok, Thailand	KO	3	
1989-12-18	Win	(Thailand) Sanphet Lukrangksee	Lumpinee Stadium	Bangkok, Thailand	Decision	5	3:00
1989-11-07	Loss	(Thailand) Therdkiat Sitthepitak	Lumpinee Stadium	Bangkok, Thailand	Decision	5	3:00
For the Lumpinee Stadium Super Bantamweight (122 lbs) title.
1989-10-06	NC	(Thailand) Wangchannoi Sor.Palangchai	Lumpinee Stadium	Bangkok, Thailand	Dismissal	5	
For the Lumpinee Stadium Super Bantamweight (122 lbs) title. The referee judged that the fighters weren't fighting up to their abilities.
1989-08-15	Win	(Thailand) Dokmaipa Por.Pongsawang	Lumpinee Stadium	Bangkok, Thailand	Decision	5	3:00
1989-07-11	Win	(Thailand) Pon Narupai	Lumpinee Stadium	Bangkok, Thailand	Decision	5	3:00
1989-06-16	Win	(Thailand) Den Muangsurin	Lumpinee Stadium	Bangkok, Thailand	Decision	5	3:00
1989-05-15	Win	(Thailand) Phetsiam Kiatsingnoi	Lumpinee Stadium	Bangkok, Thailand	KO	4	
1989-03-28	Loss	(Thailand) Ritthichai Lookchaomaesaitong	Lumpinee Stadium	Bangkok, Thailand	Decision	5	3:00
1989-03-06	Win	(Thailand) Koratnoi Sakpipat	Lumpinee Stadium	Bangkok, Thailand	Decision	5	3:00
1989-02-10	Win	(Thailand) Piewpong Hongparichart		Bangkok, Thailand	Decision	5	3:00
1989-01-23	Win	(Thailand) Ritthichai Lookchaomaesaitong	Rajadamnern Stadium	Bangkok, Thailand	Decision	5	3:00
1988-12-15	Loss	(Thailand) Kaonar Bualuangprakanphay	Rajadamnern Stadium	Bangkok, Thailand	Decision	5	3:00
1988-11-26	Loss	(Thailand) Lukhiod Muangsurin	Lumpinee Stadium	Bangkok, Thailand	Decision	5	3:00
1988-11-03	Win	(Thailand) Piewpong Hongphaparichat	Rajadamnern Stadium	Bangkok, Thailand	Decision	5	3:00
1988-10-11	Loss	(Thailand) Kaonam Bualuangprakanpay	Lumpinee Stadium	Bangkok, Thailand	Decision	5	3:00
1988-06-10	Win	(Thailand) Mahachok Singkhonpahn	Lumpinee Stadium	Bangkok, Thailand	KO	2	
1988-04-12	Loss	(Thailand) Wantongchai Sityodtong	Lumpinee Stadium	Bangkok, Thailand	Decision	5	3:00
1987-01-06	Loss	(Thailand) Muangchai Kittikasem		Bangkok, Thailand	KO (Punches)	2	
1986-11-18	Loss	(Thailand) Panphet Muangsurin	Lumpinee Stadium	Bangkok, Thailand	Decision	5	3:00
Legend: Win Loss Draw/No contest Notes
