= Jongsanan Fairtex =

Thai former professional Muay Thai fighter and boxer

- Born: Anucha Chaiyasen; July 24, 1974 (age 52); Chaiyaphum, Thailand
- Native name: อนุชา ไชยเสน
- Other names: Jongsanan Luklongbangkaew (จงสนั่น ลูกคลองบางแก้ว)
- Nickname: The Woodenman (มนุษย์ไม้)
- Height: 174 cm (5 ft 9 in)
- Division: Featherweight; Super Featherweight; Lightweight; Super Lightweight; Welterweight
- Style: Muay Thai (Muay Bouk / Muay Mat)
- Stance: Orthodox
- Team: Fairtex Gym
- Trainer: Monlit Sitphodaeng
- Years active: c. 1985–2005

Professional boxing record
- Total: 4
- Wins: 3
- By knockout: 1
- Losses: 1
- By knockout: 0
- Draws: 0

Kickboxing record
- Total: 132
- Wins: 98
- By knockout: 23
- Losses: 28
- Draws: 5
- No contests: 1

Other information
- Occupation: Muay Thai fighter (retired); Muay Thai trainer
- Website: https://www.woodenmanmuaythai.com
- Boxing record from BoxRec

Anucha Chaiyasen (Thai: อนุชา ไชยเสน; born July 24, 1974), known professionally as Jongsanan Fairtex (Thai: จงสนั่น แฟร์เท็กซ์), is a Thai former professional Muay Thai fighter. He is a former two-division Lumpinee Stadium champion who was famous in the 1990s and 2000s.

== Biography and career ==
Jongsanan was born July 24, 1974, in Chaiyaphum Province. He grew up in a poor farming family, he was introduced to Muay Thai by his grandfather with whom he would watch fights on the local television. He wasn't doing well in school and told his parents he wanted to be a fighter. He started fighting in the region from the age of 11.

At 16 Jongsanan managed to join the Fairtex Gym in Bangkok through his uncle's connections. The first five months were rough as he didn't receive any training and kept doing various chores until the gym needed him as a last minute replacement. After the win on short notice Jongsanan gained respect of the trainers, most notably of Monlit Sitphodaeng.

In 1991 Jongsanan was matched with Dokmaipa Por Pongsawang, at the time Jongsanan was receiving only 60,000 baht a fight while Dokmaipa received 200,000 baht. Jongsanan's promoter, Mr. Philip Wong, wanted this fight to be his rise to stardom, he trained harder than ever and managed to win by decision at Lumpinee Stadium on July 7.

He quickly rose to stardom at Lumpinee Stadium, becoming champion in less than 20 fights. He was known for his power, clinch and sweeps.

Jongsanan's most intense rivalry was against Sakmongkol Sithchuchok, they had 7 fights. Their fifth fight became known as the "Elbow Fight" and is considered as one of the most brutal in Muay Thai history.

In 1998 Jongsanan moved to the United States to become a trainer at the Fairtex gym in San Francisco. He kept fighting in the United States in kickboxing, boxing and Muay Thai rules until 2005.

== Titles and accomplishments ==
=== Muay Thai ===
- Lumpinee Stadium
  - 1992 Lumpinee Stadium Featherweight (126 lbs) Champion
  - 1993 Lumpinee Stadium Fight of the Year (vs Sakmongkol Sithchuchok)
  - 1994 Lumpinee Stadium Lightweight (135 lbs) Champion
- World Muay Thai Council
  - 1992 W.M.T.C World Super Featherweight (126 lbs) Champion
- International Kickboxing Federation
  - 1998 IKF Muay Thai North American Welterweight (147 lbs) Champion
- International Sport Karate Association
  - 2000 ISKA Muay Thai Intercontinental Welterweight (147 lbs) Champion
  - 2005 ISKA Oriental Rules World Welterweight (147 lbs) Champion
- International Karate Kickboxing Council
  - 2004 IKKC World Welterweight (147 lbs) Champion

=== Amateur Boxing ===
- Thailand's “Kings Cup” Silver Medalist
- Thailand's “Army Cup” Silver Medalist

== Fight record ==
Muay Thai Record
98 Wins, 28 Losses, 3 Draw
Date	Result	Opponent	Event	Location	Method	Round	Time
2005-08-20	Win	(United States) Steven Berkolayko	New York's Best of the Best	New York, USA	TKO (Corner Stoppage)	3	
ISKA Oriental rules World 147 lbs title.
2005-05-28	Win	(Suriname) Imro Main	Bad To The Bone	Las Vegas, Nevada, USA	TKO (Ref Stop/Punch)	3	1:15
Defends I.K.K.C. Junior Welterweight Muay Thai world title -63 kg.
2005-02-05	Win	(Suriname) Marco Piqué	Muay Thai World Championships	Las Vegas, Nevada, USA	TKO (Ref Stop/Punch)	3	1:15
Defends I.K.K.C. Junior Welterweight Muay Thai world title -63 kg.
2004-09-11	Win	(Japan) Hisayuki Kanazawa	WCK World Championship Muay Thai 15th Anniversary Show	Las Vegas, Nevada, USA	TKO (Knee)	3	
I.K.K.C. Junior Welterweight Muay Thai world title -63 kg.
2003-10-04	Win	(United States) Jason Fenton	New York's Best of the Best	Sacramento, California, USA	Decision (Unanimous)	5	3:00
ISKA Muay Thai Intercontinental title.
2003-04-27	NC	(United States) Ruben Yanez	Ultimate Muay Thai Challenge	Fresno, California, USA	Referee Stoppage		
2002-03-23	Win	(Australia) Daniel Dawson	Master Toddy Show @ Stardust Casino	Las Vegas, NV, USA	Decision	5	3:00
2000-11-04	Win	(United States) Danny Steele	Strikeforce	San Jose, USA	Decision (Split)	5	3:00
2000-05-13	Win	(France) Morad Sari	ISKA Muay Thai	San Jose, California, USA	Decision (Majority)	5	3:00
Wins the ISKA Intercontinental Welterweight (147 lbs) title.
?	Win	(Canada) Mark Brackenbury		Las Vegas, Nevada, USA	TKO (Referee Stoppage)	3	
1999	Win	(China) Yuan Yubao		Hawaii	Decision	3	3:00
1998-12-08	Win	(United States) Fernando Calleros	IKF	Sacramento, California, USA	Decision (Unanimous)	5	3:00
Wins the vacant IKF Muay Thai North American Welterweight (147 lbs) title.
1998-10-10	Win	(United States) Cecil Hagins		United States	KO (Low kicks)	3	
1996-08-03	Loss	(Thailand) Sakmongkol Sithchuchok	Beer Chang Tournament, Lumpinee Stadium	Bangkok, Thailand	KO (Right high kick)	3	
1997-07-13	Loss	(Morocco) Hassan Kassrioui	La Nuit des Titans	Morocco	KO (Right cross)	2	
1996-06-22	Win	(Thailand) Namkabuan Nongkeepahuyuth	Beer Chang Tournament, Lumpinee Stadium	Bangkok, Thailand	Decision	5	3:00
?	Win	(Thailand) Pairot Wor.Wolapon	Lumpinee Stadium	Bangkok, Thailand	Decision	5	3:00
1996-01-19	Loss	(Thailand) Sangtiennoi Sor.Rungroj	Lumpinee Stadium	Bangkok, Thailand	Decision	5	3:00
1995-09-29	Win	(Thailand) Sangtiennoi Sor.Rungroj	Lumpinee Stadium	Bangkok, Thailand	Decision	5	3:00
1995-08-18	Draw	(Thailand) Sangtiennoi Sor.Rungroj	Lumpinee Stadium	Bangkok, Thailand	Decision	5	3:00
1995-	Win	(Thailand) Cherry Sor.Wanich	Lumpinee Stadium	Bangkok, Thailand	Decision	5	3:00
1995-	Win	(Thailand) Cherry Sor.Wanich	Lumpinee Stadium	Bangkok, Thailand	Decision	5	3:00
1995-04-25	Win	(Thailand) Sakmongkol Sithchuchok	Lumpinee Stadium	Bangkok, Thailand	KO (High kick)	2	
1995-03-28	Loss	(Thailand) Orono Por Muang Ubon	Lumpinee Stadium	Bangkok, Thailand	Decision	5	3:00
For the Lumpinee Stadium Lightweight (135 lbs) title.
1995-01-09	Loss	(Thailand) Sakmongkol Sithchuchok	Lumpinee Stadium	Bangkok, Thailand	KO (Knee to the head)	4	
1994-12-09	Win	(Thailand) Nuathoranee Thongracha	Lumpinee Stadium	Bangkok, Thailand	Decision	5	3:00
1994-11-19	Loss	(Thailand) Pairot Wor.Walapon	Lumpinee Stadium	Bangkok, Thailand	Decision	5	3:00
Loses the Lumpinee Stadium Lightweight (135 lbs) title.
1994-07-	Win	(Thailand) Chandet Sor Prantalay	Lumpinee Stadium	Bangkok, Thailand	Decision	5	3:00
Wins the Lumpinee Stadium Lightweight (135 lbs) title.
1994-06-18	Win	(Thailand) Robert Kaennorasing	Lumpinee Stadium	Bangkok, Thailand	KO (Punch)	1	
1994-04-30	Win	(Thailand) Sakmongkol Sithchuchok	Lumpinee Stadium	Bangkok, Thailand	KO (Punches)	1	
1994-04-02	Loss	(Thailand) Therdkiat Sitthepitak	Lumpinee Stadium	Bangkok, Thailand	Decision	5	3:00
1994-01-24	Loss	(Thailand) Therdkiat Sitthepitak	Rajadamnern Stadium	Bangkok, Thailand	Decision	5	3:00
1993-12-17	Win	(Thailand) Panomrunglek Chor.Sawat	Lumpinee Stadium	Bangkok, Thailand	Decision	5	3:00
1993-10-30	Win	(Thailand) Sakmongkol Sithchuchok	Lumpinee Stadium	Bangkok, Thailand	Decision	5	3:00
1993-10-05	Loss	(Thailand) Sakmongkol Sithchuchok	Lumpinee Stadium	Bangkok, Thailand	Decision	5	3:00
1993-09-07	Loss	(Thailand) Namkabuan Nongkeepahuyuth	Lumpinee Stadium	Bangkok, Thailand	Decision	5	3:00
1992-07-11	Win	(Thailand) Therdkiat Sitthepitak		Nakhon Sawan province, Thailand	Decision	5	3:00
1993-05-04	Win	(Thailand) Sakmongkol Sithchuchok	Lumpinee Stadium	Bangkok, Thailand	Decision	5	3:00
1993-04-06	Win	(Thailand) Superlek Sornisaan	Lumpinee Stadium	Bangkok, Thailand	Decision	5	3:00
Defends the Lumpinee Stadium Featherweight (126 lbs) title.
1993-01-29	Loss	(Thailand) Therdkiat Sitthepitak	Lumpinee Stadium	Bangkok, Thailand	KO (Right high kick)	2	
1992-11-06	Loss	(Thailand) Nuathoranee Thongracha	Lumpinee Stadium	Bangkok, Thailand	Decision	5	3:00
1992-09-27	Win	(Thailand) Therdkiat Sitthepitak	Suk OneSongchai, Burswood Casino	Perth, Australia	Decision	5	3:00
Defends the Lumpinee Stadium Featherweight (126 lbs) title.
1992-08-14	Win	(Thailand) Sangtiennoi Sor.Rungroj	Lumpinee Stadium	Bangkok, Thailand	Decision	5	3:00
1992-07-21	Win	(Thailand) Petchdam Sor.Bodin	Lumpinee Stadium	Bangkok, Thailand	KO (Punches)	3	
1992-05-29	Loss	(Thailand) Boonlai Sor.Thanikul	Lumpinee Stadium	Bangkok, Thailand	Decision	5	3:00
1992-04-17	Win	(Thailand) Jaroenthong Kiatbanchong	Lumpinee Stadium	Bangkok, Thailand	Decision	5	3:00
1992-	Win	(Australia)		Australia			
Wins the WMTC World Super Featherweight (130 lbs) title.
1992-03-20	Loss	(Thailand) Nuathoranee Thongracha	Lumpinee Stadium	Bangkok, Thailand	Decision	5	3:00
1992-02-21	Win	(Thailand) Therdkiat Sitthepitak	Lumpinee Stadium	Bangkok, Thailand	Decision	5	3:00
Wins the Lumpinee Stadium Featherweight (126 lbs) title.
1992-01-21	Loss	(Thailand) Namkabuan Nongkeepahuyuth	Lumpinee Stadium	Bangkok, Thailand	Decision	5	3:00
1991-12-	Win	(Thailand) Cherry Sor Wanich	Lumpinee Stadium	Bangkok, Thailand	Decision	5	3:00
1991-10-25	Loss	(Thailand) Wangchannoi Sor Palangchai	Lumpinee Stadium	Bangkok, Thailand	Decision	5	3:00
1991-09-24	Win	(Thailand) Cherry Sor Wanich	Lumpinee Stadium	Bangkok, Thailand	Decision	5	3:00
1991-09-03	Draw	(Thailand) Boonlai Sor.Thanikul	Lumpinee Stadium	Bangkok, Thailand	Decision	5	3:00
1991-07-16	Win	(Thailand) Dokmaipa Por Pongsawang	Lumpinee Stadium	Bangkok, Thailand	Decision	5	3:00
1991-06-04	Draw	(Thailand) Samranthong Kiatbanchong	Lumpinee Stadium	Bangkok, Thailand	Decision	5	3:00
1991-04-	Win	(Thailand) Rainbow Sor.Prantalay	Lumpinee Stadium	Bangkok, Thailand	Decision	5	3:00
1991-03-15	Win	(Thailand) Panphet Muangsurin	Lumpinee Stadium	Bangkok, Thailand	Decision	5	3:00
1991-02-26	Win	(Thailand) Makamlek Sitkhunwan	Lumpinee Stadium	Bangkok, Thailand	Decision	5	3:00
1991-01-11	Loss	(Thailand) Boonlertlek Sor Nantana	Lumpinee Stadium	Bangkok, Thailand	Decision	5	3:00
Legend: Win Loss Draw/No contest Notes

== See also ==
- Fairtex Gym
