= Chandet Sor.Prantalay =

Thai martial artist

Chandet Sor Prantalay
- Born: January 13, 1973 (age 53); Maha SaraKham, Thailand
- Other names: Ai-Roke Jit (ไอ้โรคจิต) "Psychosis"
- Height: 1.70 m (5 ft 7 in)
- Weight: 159 lb (72 kg; 11.4 st)
- Division: Lightweight; Welterweight
- Style: Muay Thai (Muay Bouk)
- Stance: Orthodox
- Fighting out of: Bangkok, Thailand
- Team: Taniyama Gym; Sor Prantale Gym
- Years active: 1991–2006

Kickboxing record
- Total: 197
- Wins: 169
- By knockout: 39
- Losses: 23
- Draws: 5

Mixed martial arts record
- Total: 1
- Wins: 0
- Losses: 1
- By submission: 1

Other information
- Mixed martial arts record from Sherdog

Chandet Sor Prantalay (Thai: ชาญเดช ส.พรานทะเล), also spelled Chandet Sorpantrey (born January 13, 1973) is a Thai retired mixed martial artist and Muay Thai fighter and professional kickboxer. Before moving to Japan and competing in top tier promotion K-1, Chandet was a former Lumpinee Stadium champion in the early 1990s and is a Thai & Kickbox SuperLeague veteran and has also fought for S-Cup and Battlarts, fighting out of Sor Prantale camp in Bangkok, Thailand. In addition, he also did amateur boxing in the 1990s.

== Titles and accomplishments ==
- Lumpinee Stadium
  - 1994 Lumpinee Stadium Lightweight (135 lbs) Champion
    - One successful title defense

== Mixed martial arts record ==
Professional record breakdown
1 match	0 wins	1 loss
By submission	0	1

Res.	Record	Opponent	Method	Event	Date	Round	Time	Location	Notes
Loss	0-1	Caol Uno	Submission (rear-naked choke)	K-1 Premium Dynamite!!	December 31, 2004	2	0:19	Osaka, Japan	

== Muay Thai record ==
Muay Thai Record (Incomplete)
Date	Result	Opponent	Event	Location	Method	Round	Time
2018-05-06	Loss	(Japan) Kentaro Yoshino	J-KICK 2018～2nd～	Tokyo, Japan	TKO	1	0:48
2017-06-25	Win	(Japan) Seigo Nishimura	NKB Kamikaze Series vol.3	Tokyo, Japan	Decision (Unanimous)	3	3:00
2003-06-08	Win	(Japan) Magnum Sakai	IKUSA	Tokyo, Japan	Decision (Unanimous)	3	3:00
2002-09-29	Loss	(Japan) Kengo Yamagami	MAJKF "ADVANCE-I"	Tokyo, Japan	TKO (Doctor stoppage)	3	2:16
2002-06-23	Win	(Japan) Makoto Goto	MAJKF	Tokyo, Japan	KO	3	1:42
1999-12-24	Draw	(Australia) John Wayne Parr	MAJKF TORNADO WARNING	Tokyo, Japan	Decision	5	3:00
1999-11-26	Win	(Japan) Noboru Uchida	MAJKF	Tokyo, Japan	Decision (Majority)	5	3:00
1996-	Win	(Thailand) Pompet Naratrikul	Lumpinee Stadium	Bangkok, Thailand			
1996-	Loss	(Thailand) Wanlop Sor.Sapathan	Lumpinee Stadium – Beer Chang Tournament	Bangkok, Thailand	Referee Stoppage	5	
1996-	Win	(Thailand) Nuathoranee Thongracha	Lumpinee Stadium – Beer Chang Tournament	Bangkok, Thailand	Decision	5	3:00
1996-06-08	Loss	(Thailand) Sangtiennoi Sor.Rungroj	Lumpinee Stadium	Bangkok, Thailand	Decision	5	3:00
1995-04-25	Win	(Thailand) Pompetch Naratreekul	Lumpinee Stadium	Bangkok, Thailand	KO	1	
1995-03-	Loss	(Thailand) Sangtiennoi Sor.Rungroj	Lumpinee Stadium	Bangkok, Thailand	Decision	5	3:00
1994-	Loss	(Thailand) Namphon Nongkeepahuyuth	Lumpinee Stadium	Bangkok, Thailand	Decision	5	3:00
1994-	Win	(Thailand) Namphon Nongkeepahuyuth	Lumpinee Stadium	Bangkok, Thailand	Decision	5	3:00
1994-09-12	Loss	(Thailand) Superlek Sornisaan	Lumpinee Stadium	Bangkok, Thailand	KO (Right Cross)	3	
1994-	Win	(Thailand) Jomhod Kiatadisak	Lumpinee Stadium	Bangkok, Thailand	Decision	5	3:00
1994-	Win	(Thailand) Namphon Nongkeepahuyuth	Lumpinee Stadium	Bangkok, Thailand	Decision	5	3:00
1994-07-	Loss	(Thailand) Jongsanan Fairtex	Lumpinee Stadium	Bangkok, Thailand	Decision	5	3:00
Loses the Lumpinee Stadium Lightweight (135 lbs) title.
1994-	Loss	(Thailand) Sakmongkol Sithchuchok	Lumpinee Stadium	Bangkok, Thailand	Decision	5	3:00
1994-03-25	Win	(Thailand) Sangtiennoi Sor.Rungroj	Lumpinee Stadium	Bangkok, Thailand	Decision	5	3:00
Defends the Lumpinee Stadium Lightweight (135 lbs) title.
1994-02-13	Win	(Thailand) Sakmongkol Sithchuchok	Lumpinee Stadium	Bangkok, Thailand	Decision	5	3:00
Wins the Lumpinee Stadium Lightweight (135 lbs) title.
1994-	Win	(Thailand) Sangtiennoi Sor.Rungroj	Lumpinee Stadium	Bangkok, Thailand	TKO (Doctor Stoppage)	4	
?	Loss	(Thailand) Panomrunglek Chor.Sawat	Lumpinee Stadium	Bangkok, Thailand	Decision	5	3:00
1993-08-25	Loss	(Thailand) Pairot Wor.Wolapon	Lumpinee Stadium	Bangkok, Thailand	Decision	5	3:00
1993-	Win	(Thailand) Panomrunglek Chor.Sawat	Lumpinee Stadium	Bangkok, Thailand	Decision	5	3:00
1993-05-04	Win	(Thailand) Petchdam Lukborai	Lumpinee Stadium	Bangkok, Thailand	Decision	5	3:00
1993-03-23	Loss	(Thailand) Therdkiat Sitthepitak	Lumpinee Stadium	Bangkok, Thailand	Decision	5	3:00
1993-02-26	Loss	(Thailand) Nuathoranee Thongracha	Lumpinee Stadium	Bangkok, Thailand	Decision	5	3:00
1993-01-29	Win	(Thailand) Cherry Sor.Wanich	Lumpinee Stadium	Bangkok, Thailand	Decision	5	3:00
1992-12-24	Win	(Thailand) Sangtiennoi Sor.Rungroj	Lumpinee Stadium	Bangkok, Thailand	Decision	5	3:00
1992-11-13	Win	(Thailand) Jaroenthong Kiatbanchong	Lumpinee Stadium	Bangkok, Thailand	Referee Stoppage		
1992-10-23	Win	(Thailand) Orono Por.MuangUbon	Lumpinee Stadium	Bangkok, Thailand	Decision	5	3:00
1992-09-12	Loss	(Thailand) Superlek Sornisaan	Lumpinee Stadium	Bangkok, Thailand	KO	3	
1992-06-09	Loss	(Thailand) Cherry Sor.Wanich	Lumpinee Stadium	Bangkok, Thailand	Decision	5	3:00
1992-	Win	(Thailand) Jirasak Por.Pongsawang	Lumpinee Stadium	Bangkok, Thailand	KO	3	
1992-04-24	Win	(Thailand) Superlek Sornisaan	Lumpinee Stadium	Bangkok, Thailand	Decision	5	3:00
1992-03-01	Draw	(Thailand) Yodawut Sitmaek	Lumpinee Stadium	Bangkok, Thailand	Decision	5	3:00
1992-02-28	Win	(France) Dida Diafat	Crocodile Farm	Samut Prakan, Thailand	Decision	5	3:00
1991-11-16	Loss	(Thailand) Boonlertlek Sor.Nantana	Lumpinee Stadium	Bangkok, Thailand	KO	3	
1991-09-27	Loss	(Thailand) Thanooin Chor.Chuchart	Lumpinee Stadium	Bangkok, Thailand	Decision	5	3:00
1991-08-10	Win	(Thailand) Detduang Por.Pongsawang	Lumpinee Stadium	Bangkok, Thailand	Decision	5	3:00
1991-06-29	Loss	(Thailand) Kaonar Por.Kettalingchan	Lumpinee Stadium	Bangkok, Thailand	Decision	5	3:00
1991-02-12	Loss	(Thailand) Kruekchai Sor.Kettalingchan	Lumpinee Stadium	Bangkok, Thailand	Decision	5	3:00
1991-01-25	Draw	(Thailand) Kruekchai Sor.Kettalingchan	Lumpinee Stadium	Bangkok, Thailand	Decision	5	3:00
1990-12-07	Loss	(Thailand) Tukatathong Por.Pongsawang	Lumpinee Stadium	Bangkok, Thailand	Decision	5	3:00
1990-11-09	Win	(Thailand) Toto Por Pongsawang	Lumpinee Stadium	Bangkok, Thailand	Decision	5	3:00
1990-09-25	Loss	(Thailand) Pongsiri Por.Ruamrudee	Lumpinee Stadium	Bangkok, Thailand	Decision	5	3:00
1990-08-21	Loss	(Thailand) Kompayak Singmanee	Lumpinee Stadium	Bangkok, Thailand	Decision	5	3:00
1990-08-03	Loss	(Thailand) Panphet Muangsurin	Lumpinee Stadium	Bangkok, Thailand	Decision	5	3:00
1990-07-10	Win	(Thailand) Paruhatlek Sitchunthong	Lumpinee Stadium	Bangkok, Thailand	Decision	5	3:00
1990-06-19	Draw	(Thailand) Kraiwannoi SitKruOd	Lumpinee Stadium	Bangkok, Thailand	Decision	5	3:00
1990-05-15	Win	(Thailand) Orono Por.MuangUbon	Lumpinee Stadium	Bangkok, Thailand	Decision	5	3:00
1990-04-24	Win	(Thailand) Pornsak Muangsurin	Lumpinee Stadium	Bangkok, Thailand	Decision	5	3:00
1990-	Loss	(Thailand) Thongchai Tor.Silachai	Lumpinee Stadium	Bangkok, Thailand	Decision	5	3:00
1990-02-24	Win	(Thailand) Chalongchai Kiatasawin	Lumpinee Stadium	Bangkok, Thailand	Decision	5	3:00
1989-11-03	Win	(Thailand) Nungubon Sitlerchai	Lumpinee Stadium	Bangkok, Thailand	Decision	5	3:00
Legend: Win Loss Draw/No contest Notes
