= Orono Por.MuangUbon =

Thai former professional Muay Thai fighter

- Born: Somkid Deomprakon; January 14, 1973 (age 53); Buriram, Thailand
- Nickname: Mr. Triple O (บัก3โอ); Super Black (ซุปเปอร์ แบล็ค)
- Height: 174 cm (5 ft 9 in)
- Division: Lightweight; Light Welterweight; Welterweight; Super Welterweight; Middleweight
- Style: Muay Thai (Muay Bouk)
- Stance: Southpaw
- Trainer: Poj Wongmueangchan
- Years active: c. 1983–2017

Other information
- Occupation: Muay Thai trainer

Somkid Deomprakon (Thai: สมคิด เติมประโคน; born January 14, 1973), known professionally as Orono Por.MuangUbon (Thai: โอโรโน่ พ.เมืองอุบล) is a Thai former professional Muay Thai fighter. He is a former Lumpinee Stadium Lightweight Champion, as well as the 1994 Sports Writers Association of Thailand Fighter of the Year. He was famous during the 1990s and 2000s.

== Biography and career ==
The son of a Thai mother and an American father, he was born Somkid Deomprakon. His ring name, "Orono", was given to him by a trainer who thought he bore a strong resemblance to the Venezuelan boxing champion Rafael Orono, who came to compete for a world title in Thailand in 1983 and 1985. Orono was known in the Thai media as "Super Black". He started Muay Thai at age 10 in the Kiatkamchai camp. At 15, Orono joined the Por Muang Ubon gym in Ubon Ratchathani Province to start his Bangkok career, training alongside other notable fighters such as Nungubon Sitlerchai and Nuengtrakarn Por Muang Ubon.

Orono rapidly made a name for himself in Bangkok, fighting for the Songchai promotion. He was recognized for his southpaw style and ability to endure punishment. This style led him to put on very entertaining fights, some of which were awarded "Fight of the Year" by Muay Thai institutions such as the Lumpinee Stadium or the Sports Writers Association of Thailand. The latter also designated him as "Fighter of the year" in 1994.

In the early 2010s, Orono became a trainer at various Muay Thai camps including 13 Coins Resort. He continued taking fights until 2017.

== Titles and honours ==
- Lumpinee Stadium
  - 1994 Lumpinee Stadium Lightweight (135 lbs) Champion
    - Two successful title defenses
  - 1998 Lumpinee Stadium Fight of the Year (vs. Sakmongkol Sithchuchok)
- International World MuayThai
  - IWM Light Welterweight (140 lbs) Champion
- Sports Writers Association of Thailand
  - 1994 Fighter of the Year
  - 1995 Fight of the Year (vs. Pairot Wor.Walapon)
  - 1998 Fight of the Year (vs. Sakmongkol Sithchuchok)

== Fight record ==
Muay Thai Record (Incomplete)
Date	Result	Opponent	Event	Location	Method	Round	Time
2017-12-22	Loss	(Germany) Erhan Güngör	Muay Xtreme	Bangkok, Thailand	Decision	3	3:00
2017-08-11	Win	(Thailand) Rotnarong Daopadriew	Lumpinee Stadium	Bangkok, Thailand	Decision	5	3:00
2013-09-12	Loss	(Iran) Behzad Rafigh Doust	Siam Sport TV (13 Coins Stadium )	Bangkok, Thailand	Decision	5	3:00
2013-07-09	Win	(Latvia) Vlad Malko		Thailand	TKO (Knees & Elbow)	4	
2013-05-12	Loss	(United Kingdom) Danny Edwards	Rajadamnern Stadium	Bangkok, Thailand	Decision	5	3:00
2009-12-05	Loss	(France) Djimé Coulibaly	King's Birthday	Bangkok, Thailand	KO	4	
2007-	Loss	(Australia) Soren Monkongtong	Channel 7 Stadium	Bangkok, Thailand	Decision	5	3:00
2007-02-02	Loss	(Thailand) Kit Sitpholek	Thepprasit Stadium	Pattaya, Thailand	Decision	5	3:00
2005-09-09	Loss	(Japan) Ryuji Goto	Xplosion 11: Night of Champions	Hong Kong	Decision	5	3:00
2004-	Win	(Thailand) Ying Yai		Thailand	KO		
2002-08-19	Loss	(France) Farid Villaume	Queen's Birthday event	Sukhothai, Thailand	Decision	5	3:00
For the vacant WMTC World -66kg title.
2002-04-13	Loss	(France) Jean-Charles Skarbowsky	Songkran: New Year Celebration	Nakhon Ratchasima, Thailand	Decision	5	3:00
2002-03-04	Draw	(France) Jean-Charles Skarbowsky	Rajadamnern Stadium	Bangkok, Thailand	Decision	5	3:00
2002-01-00	Loss	(France) Jean-Charles Skarbowsky		Udon Thani, Thailand	TKO (Ref stop)	3	
2001-05-20	Win	(Japan) Ryuji Goto	MAJKF	Tokyo, Japan	Decision (Majority)	5	3:00
2001-04-01	Loss	(Thailand) Duan Esarn Kiatsarika	Ngamwongwan Mall	Nonthaburi, Thailand	Decision	5	3:00
?	Win	(Thailand) Rodtang War.Tweekeat		Thailand	Decision	5	3:00
2000-12-05	Loss	(Australia) John Wayne Parr	Thai King's Birthday Event "Kings Cup"	Sanam Luang, Thailand	Decision (unanimous)	5	3:00
For the vacant IMF World Middleweight (160 lbs) title.
2000-10-14	Loss	(Thailand) Suriya Sor.Ploenchit	Lumpinee Stadium	Bangkok, Thailand	Decision	5	3:00
2000-09-24	Win	(Japan) Kunihide Anose	NJKF Millenium Wars 8	Tokyo, Japan	Decision (Unanimous)	5	3:00
2000-	Loss	(France) Morad Sari		Las Vegas, USA	Decision	5	3:00
For the ISKA Muay Thai Intercontinental Super Welterweight (154 lbs) title.
2000-	Loss	(Thailand) Kaolan Kaovichit	Lumpinee Stadium	Bangkok, Thailand	Decision	5	3:00
2000-01-29	Win	(France) Stéphane Nikiéma	NJKF Millenium Wars 1	Tokyo, Japan	Decision (Split)	5	3:00
Defends the IWM Light Welterweight title.
1999-12-05	Win	(France) Morad Sari	King's Birthday	Bangkok, Thailand	Decision	5	3:00
1999-	Loss	(Thailand) Somchai Sor.Nantana	Lumpinee Stadium	Bangkok, Thailand	Decision	5	3:00
1999-01-02	Win	(Thailand) Therdkiat Kiatrungroj	Lumpinee Stadium	Bangkok, Thailand	Decision	5	3:00
1998-12-05	Win	(Morocco) Hassan Kassrioui	King's Birthday	Bangkok, Thailand	KO (knees to the body)	3	
1998-10-24	Win	(Thailand) Somchai Sor.Nantana	Lumpinee Stadium	Bangkok, Thailand	Decision	5	3:00
1998-08-28	Loss	(Thailand) Sakmongkol Sithchuchok	Wan Songchai Promotions	Bangkok, Thailand	Decision	5	3:00
1998-07-19	Loss	(Thailand) Sakmongkol Sithchuchok	ITV	Chachoengsao, Thailand	Decision	5	3:00
1998-06-27	Draw	(Thailand) Sakmongkol Sithchuchok	Lumpinee Stadium	Bangkok, Thailand	Decision	5	3:00
1998-05-02	Win	(Thailand) Dejpitak Sityodtong	Lumpinee Stadium	Bangkok, Thailand	Decision	5	3:00
1998-03-21	Loss	(Thailand) Sakmongkol Sithchuchok	Lumpinee Stadium	Bangkok, Thailand	Decision	5	3:00
1998-03-03	Win	(Thailand) Angkarndej Por.Paoin	Lumpinee Stadium	Bangkok, Thailand	Decision	5	3:00
1998-	Loss	(France) Dany Bill		Paris, France	Decision (Unanimous)	5	3:00
For the vacant WMTC World Super Welterweight (154 lbs) title.
1997-12-05	Loss	(France) Dany Bill	King's Birthday	Bangkok, Thailand	Decision (Unanimous)	5	3:00
1997-10-11	Win	(Thailand) Kongpatapee Sor Sumalee	Lumpinee Stadium	Bangkok, Thailand	Decision	5	3:00
1997-07-	Win	(Thailand) Nuathoranee Thongracha	Lumpinee Stadium	Bangkok, Thailand	Decision	5	3:00
1997-07-06	Win	(Australia) John Wayne Parr	Chachoengsao	Bangkok, Thailand	TKO (doctor stoppage)	2	
1997-04-20	Loss	(Morocco) Hassan Ettaki		Amsterdam, Netherlands	Decision	5	3:00
1997-02-09	Loss	(Thailand) Kaoponglek Luksuratham		Phichit, Thailand	TKO (Doctor stoppage)	4	
?	Loss	(Suriname) Rayen Simson		Thailand	Decision	5	3:00
1996-10-11	Draw	(Thailand) Sangtiennoi Sor.Rungroj	Lumpinee Stadium	Bangkok, Thailand	Decision	5	3:00
Defends the Lumpinee Stadium Lightweight (135 lbs) title.
1995-	Win	(Thailand) Saenchai Kiatworawut	Lumpinee Stadium	Bangkok, Thailand	Decision	5	3:00
1995-	Loss	(Thailand) Therdkiat Sitthepitak	Lumpinee Stadium	Bangkok, Thailand	Decision	5	3:00
1995-	Win	(Thailand) Coban Lookchaomaesaitong		Thailand	Decision	5	3:00
1995-04-28	Win	(Thailand) Pairot Wor.Wolapon	Lumpinee Stadium	Bangkok, Thailand	KO (throw)	4	
1995-04-08	Win	(Netherlands) Ramon Dekkers		Bangkok, Thailand	Decision	5	3:00
1995-03-28	Win	(Thailand) Jongsanan Fairtex	Lumpinee Stadium	Bangkok, Thailand	Decision	5	3:00
Defends the Lumpinee Stadium Lightweight (135 lbs) title.
1995-02-28	Win	(Thailand) Namkabuan Nongkeepahuyuth	Lumpinee Stadium	Bangkok, Thailand	Decision	5	3:00
1995-01-31	Loss	(Thailand) Therdkiat Sitthepitak	Lumpinee Stadium	Bangkok, Thailand	Decision	5	3:00
1994-12-24	Win	(Thailand) Pairot Wor.Wolapon	Lumpinee Stadium	Bangkok, Thailand	Decision	5	3:00
Wins the Lumpinee Stadium Lightweight (135 lbs) title and the Asia Cement Tournament.
1994-11-26	Win	(Thailand) Namphon Nongkeepahuyuth	Lumpinee Stadium	Bangkok, Thailand	Decision	5	3:00
1994-10-24	NC	(Thailand) Pairot Wor.Wolapon	Rajadamnern Stadium	Bangkok, Thailand		5	3:00
Originally a decision win for Pairot. Overturned to a no contest after the gamblers rioted.
1994-08-	Loss	(Thailand) Pomphet Naratreekul		Trang, Thailand	Decision	5	3:00
1994-07-	Win	(Thailand) Nuathoranee Thongracha	Lumpinee Stadium	Bangkok, Thailand	Decision	5	3:00
1994-07-02	Win	(Thailand) Sangtiennoi Sor.Rungroj	Lumpinee Stadium	Bangkok, Thailand	TKO (Shoulder dislocation)	3	
1994-06-11	Win	(Thailand) Pairot Wor.Wolapon	Lumpinee Stadium	Bangkok, Thailand	Decision	5	3:00
1994-04-	Win	(Thailand) Panomrunglek Chor.Sawat	Lumpinee Stadium	Bangkok, Thailand	Decision	5	3:00
1994-03-14	Win	(Thailand) Jaroenthong Kiatbanchong	Rajadamnern Stadium	Bangkok, Thailand	Decision	5	3:00
1994-02-15	Win	(Thailand) Cherry Sor.Wanich	Lumpinee Stadium	Bangkok, Thailand	Decision	5	3:00
1994-01-23	Win	(Thailand) Chotchai Chuchokchai	Lumpinee Stadium	Bangkok, Thailand	Decision	5	3:00
1993-12-23	Loss	(Thailand) Namphon Nongkeepahuyuth	Lumpinee Stadium	Bangkok, Thailand	Decision	5	3:00
1993-10-30	Loss	(Thailand) Petchdam Sityodtong	Lumpinee Stadium	Bangkok, Thailand	Decision	5	3:00
For the Lumpinee Stadium Lightweight (135 lbs) title.
1993-	Win	(Thailand) Prabseuklek Sitnarong	Sanam Luang	Bangkok, Thailand	Decision	5	3:00
1993-08-31	Loss	(Thailand) Sangtiennoi Sor.Rungroj	Lumpinee Stadium	Bangkok, Thailand	Decision	5	3:00
1993-07-27	Win	(Thailand) Sangtiennoi Sor.Rungroj	Lumpinee Stadium	Bangkok, Thailand	Decision	5	3:00
1993-06-25	Loss	(Thailand) Chotchai Chuchokchai	Lumpinee Stadium	Bangkok, Thailand	Decision	5	3:00
1993-05-04	Loss	(Thailand) Den Muangsurin	Lumpinee Stadium	Bangkok, Thailand	Decision	5	3:00
1993-04-22	Loss	(Thailand) Chotchai Chuchokchai	Lumpinee Stadium	Bangkok, Thailand	Decision	5	3:00
1993-04-06	Loss	(Thailand) Pairot Wor.Wolapon	Lumpinee Stadium	Bangkok, Thailand	Decision	5	3:00
?	Win	(Thailand) Panomrunglek Chor.Sawat	Lumpinee Stadium	Bangkok, Thailand	Decision	5	3:00
1993-01-08	Loss	(Thailand) Cherry Sor.Wanich	Lumpinee Stadium	Bangkok, Thailand	Decision	5	3:00
?	Win	(Thailand) Den Muangsurin	Lumpinee Stadium	Bangkok, Thailand	Decision	5	3:00
1992-	Win	(Thailand) Jirasak Por.Pongsawang	Lumpinee Stadium	Bangkok, Thailand	Decision	5	3:00
1992-10-23	Loss	(Thailand) Chandet Sor.Prantalay	Lumpinee Stadium	Bangkok, Thailand	Decision	5	3:00
1992-09-25	Loss	(Thailand) Chanchai Sor.Tamarangsri		Bangkok, Thailand	Decision	5	3:00
1992-07-21	Loss	(Thailand) Sakmongkol Sithchuchok	Lumpinee Stadium	Bangkok, Thailand	Decision	5	3:00
1992-06-13	Loss	(Thailand) Jaroenthong Kiatbanchong	Lumpinee Stadium	Bangkok, Thailand	Decision	5	3:00
1992-04-26	Win	(Netherlands) Ramon Dekkers		Samut Prakan, Thailand	Decision	5	3:00
1992-02-21	Loss	(Thailand) Cherry Sor.Wanich	Lumpinee Stadium	Bangkok, Thailand	Decision	5	3:00
1992-01-21	Win	(Thailand) Jirasak Por.Pongsawang	Lumpinee Stadium	Bangkok, Thailand	Decision	5	3:00
1991-12-27	Win	(Thailand) Prabphairi Phrabrama	Lumpinee Stadium	Bangkok, Thailand	Decision	5	3:00
1991-10-18	Win	(Thailand) Wisanusak Sor.Wirakun	Lumpinee Stadium	Bangkok, Thailand	Decision	5	3:00
1991-09-24	Loss	(Thailand) Detsak Sakpradu	Lumpinee Stadium	Bangkok, Thailand	Decision	5	3:00
1991-05-25	Loss	(Thailand) Thanooin Chor.Chuchart	Lumpinee Stadium	Bangkok, Thailand	Decision	5	3:00
1991-04-27	Loss	(Thailand) Thanooin Chor.Chuchart	Lumpinee Stadium	Bangkok, Thailand	Decision	5	3:00
1991-03-05	Loss	(Thailand) Samransak Muangsurin	Lumpinee Stadium	Bangkok, Thailand	Decision	5	3:00
1991-02-09	Loss	(Thailand) Thanooin Chor.Chuchart	Lumpinee Stadium	Bangkok, Thailand	Decision	5	3:00
1991-01-21	Loss	(Thailand) Rittichai Lookchaomaesaitong	Lumpinee Stadium	Bangkok, Thailand	Decision	5	3:00
1990-	Win	(Netherlands) Mikael Lieuwfat		England	KO (Left Elbow)	3	
1990-11-20	Win	(Thailand) Panphet Muangsurin	Lumpinee Stadium	Bangkok, Thailand	Decision	5	3:00
1990-10-12	Loss	(Thailand) Langsuan Panyuthaphum	Lumpinee Stadium	Bangkok, Thailand	Decision	5	3:00
1990-09-25	Win	(Thailand) Kompayak Singmanee	Lumpinee Stadium	Bangkok, Thailand	Decision	5	3:00
1990-08-31	Win	(Thailand) Paruhatlek Sitchunthong	Lumpinee Stadium	Bangkok, Thailand	Decision	5	3:00
1990-08-15	Win	(Thailand) Pongsiri Por.Ruamrudee	Rajadamnern Stadium	Bangkok, Thailand	Decision	5	3:00
1990-07-20	Win	(Thailand) Duangsompong Tor.Sitthichai	Lumpinee Stadium	Bangkok, Thailand	Decision	5	3:00
1990-05-15	Loss	(Thailand) Chandet Sor.Prantalay	Lumpinee Stadium	Bangkok, Thailand	Decision	5	3:00
1990-04-24	Win	(Thailand) Pornnimit Muanglopburi	Lumpinee Stadium	Bangkok, Thailand	Decision	5	3:00
1990-03-30	Win	(Thailand) Pornsak Muagnsurin	Lumpinee Stadium	Bangkok, Thailand	Decision	5	3:00
1990-01-15	Loss	(Thailand) Kruekchai Sor.Kettalingchan	Rajadamnern Stadium	Bangkok, Thailand	Decision	5	3:00
19??-02-10	Win	(Thailand) Singhao Tor.Hintok	Lumpinee Stadium	Bangkok, Thailand	Decision	5	3:00
1989-11-03	Win	(Thailand) Kruekchai Sor.Kettalingchan	Lumpinee Stadium	Bangkok, Thailand	Decision	5	3:00
1989-10-06	Win	(Thailand) Kongkiat Sor.Rangsanpanich	Lumpinee Stadium	Bangkok, Thailand	Decision	5	3:00
1989-09-18	Loss	(Thailand) Kruekchai Sor.Kettalingchan	Rajadamnern Stadium	Bangkok, Thailand	Decision	5	3:00
1989-06-13	Loss	(Thailand) Sakmongkol Sithchuchok	Lumpinee Stadium	Bangkok, Thailand	Decision	5	3:00
1989-05-15	Win	(Thailand) Sakmongkol Sithchuchok	Rajadamnern Stadium	Bangkok, Thailand	Decision	5	3:00
1989-03-28	Loss	(Thailand) Playchumphon Sor Prantalay	Lumpinee Stadium	Bangkok, Thailand	Decision	5	3:00
1989-03-04	Win	(Thailand) Tukatathong Por.Pongsawang	Lumpinee Stadium	Bangkok, Thailand	Decision	5	3:00
1989-02-17	Win	(Thailand) Pichai Wor.Walapon	Lumpinee Stadium	Bangkok, Thailand	Decision	5	3:00
1988-12-16	Win	(Thailand) Jaroensap Kiatbanchong	Lumpinee Stadium	Bangkok, Thailand	Decision	5	3:00
Legend: Win Loss Draw/No contest Notes
