= Panphet Muangsurin =

Thai boxer

- Born: Alongkorn Jermsiriwattana; June 19, 1965 (age 61); Bua Yai, Nakhon Ratchasima, Thailand
- Native name: อลงกรณ์ เจิมศิริวัฒนา
- Other names: Parnpetch Muangsurin
- Nickname: Fierce-eyed (ไอ้ตาดุ)
- Division: Mini Flyweight; Light Flyweight; Flyweight; Super Flyweight
- Style: Muay Thai (Muay Mat)
- Stance: Orthodox
- Team: Muangsurin
- Trainer: Raktae Muangsurin

Alongkorn Jermsiriwattana (Thai: อลงกรณ์ เจิมศิริวัฒนา; born June 19, 1965), known professionally as Panphet Muangsurin (Thai: พานเพชร เมืองสุรินทร์), is a Thai former professional Muay Thai fighter. He is a former Lumpinee Stadium title challenger who was active during the 1980s and 1990s.

== Biography and career ==
Panphet started training in Muay Thai at the age of 13 with a former boxer, Lanmongkol Pholsaming, in his native province.

In 1984 Panphet joined the Muangsurin gym in Bangkok, following his school friend Lukkiat Muangsurin. Panphet would stay at the camp for the rest of his career, training alongside fighters such as Samransak Muangsurin, Coban Lookchaomaesaitong, Chainoi Muangsurin, and Den Muangsurin.

He fought during the Golden Era of Muay Thai for the most prominent promoter of the time, Songchai Rattanasuban. During his career Panphet defeated many notable fighters including Karuhat Sor.Supawan, Hippy Singmanee, Kaensak Sor.Ploenjit, Paruhatlek Sitchunthong, Jaroensap Kiatbanchong, and Mathee Jadeepitak.

== Fight record ==
Muay Thai Record
Date	Result	Opponent	Event	Location	Method	Round	Time
1996-09-22	Loss	(Thailand) Denkaosan Kaovichit		Ko Samui, Thailand	Decision	5	3:00
1995-04-25	Win	(Thailand) Attachai Kiatpanom	Lumpinee Stadium	Bangkok, Thailand	KO	3	
1994-07-22	Loss	(Thailand) Singsamphan Kiatsingnoi	Kiatsingnoi, Rajadamnern Stadium	Bangkok, Thailand	KO (Right cross)	1	
1994-07-08	Loss	(Thailand) Yodsiam Sor.Prantalay	Lumpinee Stadium	Bangkok, Thailand	Decision	5	3:00
1994-03-25	Win	(Thailand) Changnoi Sor.Wanich	Lumpinee Stadium	Bangkok, Thailand	KO	4	
1994-02-12	Loss	(Thailand) Kompayak Singmanee	Lumpinee Stadium	Bangkok, Thailand	Decision	5	3:00
For the Chalam Buk Muay Thai Championship.
1994-01-08	NC	(Thailand) Kompayak Singmanee	Lumpinee Stadium	Bangkok, Thailand	overturned decision	5	3:00
For the Shark Attack Muay Thai Championship. Originally a decision win for Kompayak, overturned after protest.
1993-11-20	Win	(Thailand) Chailek Sitkaruhat	Onesongchai, Lumpinee Stadium	Bangkok, Thailand	Decision	5	3:00
1993-09-04	Loss	(Thailand) Phutphadlek Sor.Chalermchai	Lumpinee Stadium	Bangkok, Thailand	Decision	5	3:00
1993-	Loss	(Thailand) Pichitnoi Sitbangprachan	Onesongchai, Lumpinee Stadium	Bangkok, Thailand	Decision	5	3:00
1993-04-30	Loss	(Thailand) Wangthong Por.Pisitchet	Kiatsingnoi, Rajadamnern Stadium	Bangkok, Thailand	KO	3	
1993-03-29	Loss	(Thailand) Kasemlek QualityGym	Kiatsingnoi, Rajadamnern Stadium	Bangkok, Thailand	TKO (Doctor stoppage)	4	
1992-	Loss	(Thailand) Tukatathong Por.Pongsawang	Lumpinee Stadium	Bangkok, Thailand	Decision	5	3:00
1992-07-03	Loss	(Thailand) Singhao Tor.Hintok	Lumpinee Stadium	Bangkok, Thailand	KO (Punches)	1	
1992-04-24	Loss	(Thailand) Lamnamoon Sor.Sumalee	Lumpinee Stadium	Bangkok, Thailand	Decision	5	3:00
1992-03-10	Win	(Thailand) Thongchai Tor.Silachai	Lumpinee Stadium	Bangkok, Thailand	Decision	5	3:00
1992-01-07	Loss	(Thailand) Nungubon Sitlerchai	Lumpinee Stadium	Bangkok, Thailand	Decision	5	3:00
1991-11-11	Loss	(Thailand) Chodchoi Chuchokchai	Kiatsingnoi, Rajadamnern Stadium	Bangkok, Thailand	Decision	5	3:00
1991-10-18	Win	(Thailand) Detduang Por.Pongsawang	Onesongchai, Lumpinee Stadium	Bangkok, Thailand	Decision	5	3:00
1991-09-27	Win	(Thailand) Jaroensap Kiatbanchong	Lumpinee Stadium	Bangkok, Thailand	TKO (Doctor stoppage)	2	
1991-08-14	Loss	(Thailand) Duangsompong Por.Pongsawang	Rajadamnern Stadium	Bangkok, Thailand	KO (High kick)	2	
1991-06-14	Loss	(Thailand) Pongsiri Por.Ruamrudee	Lumpinee Stadium	Bangkok, Thailand	Decision	5	3:00
1991-05-04	Win	(Thailand) Kruekchai Sor.Kettalingchan	Lumpinee Stadium	Bangkok, Thailand	KO (Punches)	1	
1991-03-15	Loss	(Thailand) Jongsanan Fairtex	Lumpinee Stadium	Bangkok, Thailand	Decision	5	3:00
1991-02-26	Win	(Thailand) Boonlertlek Sor.Nantana	Fairtex, Lumpinee Stadium	Bangkok, Thailand	Decision	5	3:00
1991-01-11	Loss	(Thailand) Kaew Chor.Chueachat	Fairtex, Lumpinee Stadium	Bangkok, Thailand	TKO (shoulder dislocation)	3	
1990-12-18	Win	(Thailand) Boonlong Sor.Thanikul	Lumpinee Stadium	Bangkok, Thailand	Decision	5	3:00
1990-11-20	Loss	(Thailand) Orono Por.MuangUbon	Lumpinee Stadium	Bangkok, Thailand	Decision	5	3:00
1990-10-12	Loss	(Thailand) Rainbow Sor.Prantalay	Lumpinee Stadium	Bangkok, Thailand	Decision	5	3:00
1990-09-11	Loss	(Thailand) Detduang Por.Pongsawang	Lumpinee Stadium	Bangkok, Thailand	TKO (Doctor stoppage)	4	
1990-08-21	Draw	(Thailand) Detduang Por.Pongsawang	Lumpinee Stadium	Bangkok, Thailand	Decision	5	3:00
1990-08-03	Win	(Thailand) Chandet Sor.Prantalay	Lumpinee Stadium	Bangkok, Thailand	Decision	5	3:00
1990-07-10	Win	(Thailand) Mathee Jadeepitak	Onesongchai, Lumpinee Stadium	Bangkok, Thailand	Decision	5	3:00
1990-06-19	Win	(Thailand) Mathee Jadeepitak	Lumpinee Stadium	Bangkok, Thailand	Decision	5	3:00
1990-05-27	Win	(Netherlands) Maikel Lieuwfat		Amsterdam, Netherlands	Decision	5	3:00
1990-04-27	Win	(Thailand) Samranthong Kiatbanchong	Lumpinee Stadium	Bangkok, Thailand	KO	2	
1990-04-10	Loss	(Thailand) Oley Kiatoneway	Lumpinee Stadium	Bangkok, Thailand	Decision	5	3:00
1990-03-13	Win	(Thailand) Karuhat Sor.Supawan	Lumpinee Stadium	Bangkok, Thailand	Decision	5	3:00
1990-02-16	Win	(Thailand) Odnoi Lookprabat	Rajadamnern Stadium	Bangkok, Thailand	KO	3	
1990-01-30	Win	(Thailand) Daoden Sor.Sakkesem		Thailand	Decision	5	3:00
1990-01-06	Win	(Thailand) Pongsiri Por.Ruamrudee	Lumpinee Stadium	Bangkok, Thailand	Decision	5	3:00
1989-11-11	Loss	(Thailand) Daoden Sor.Sakkesem		Nakhon Pathom, Thailand	Decision	5	3:00
1989-10-20	Loss	(Thailand) Boonlai Sor.Thanikul	Rajadamnern Stadium	Bangkok, Thailand	Decision	5	3:00
1989-10-06	Draw	(Thailand) Oley Kiatoneway	Lumpinee Stadium	Bangkok, Thailand	Decision	5	3:00
1989-10-03	Win	(Thailand) Samranthong Kiatbanchong	Lumpinee Stadium	Bangkok, Thailand	KO	2	
1989-09-08	Loss	(Thailand) Thanooin Chor.Chuchart	Lumpinee Stadium	Bangkok, Thailand	Decision	5	3:00
For the vacant Lumpinee Stadium Flyweight (112 lbs) title.
1989-08-15	Win	(Thailand) Karuhat Sor.Supawan	Lumpinee Stadium	Bangkok, Thailand	Decision	5	3:00
1989-07-25	Win	(Thailand) Paruhatlek Sitchunthong	Lumpinee Stadium	Bangkok, Thailand	Decision	5	3:00
1989-06-13	Win	(Thailand) Hippy Singmanee	Lumpinee Stadium	Bangkok, Thailand	Decision	5	3:00
1989-05-12	Draw	(Thailand) Veeraphol Sahaprom	Lumpinee Stadium	Bangkok, Thailand	Decision	5	3:00
1989-04-07	Win	(Thailand) Mawinprasat Hinphimai	Lumpinee Stadium	Bangkok, Thailand	KO	3	
1989-01-31	Win	(Thailand) Petchjan Sakwicha	Lumpinee Stadium	Bangkok, Thailand	Decision	5	3:00
1989-01-07	Loss	(Thailand) Kaensak Sor.Ploenjit	Lumpinee Stadium	Bangkok, Thailand	Decision	5	3:00
1988-10-21	Loss	(Thailand) Seesot Sahakarnosoth.	Fairtex, Lumpinee Stadium	Bangkok, Thailand	KO (High kick)	2	
1988-09-27	Loss	(Thailand) Phuengluang Kiatanan	Onesongchai, Lumpinee Stadium	Bangkok, Thailand	Decision	5	3:00
1988-08-18	Loss	(Thailand) Morakot Sor.Thamarangsri	Rajadamnern Stadium	Bangkok, Thailand	Decision	5	3:00
1988-07-26	Win	(Thailand) Kaensak Sor.Ploenjit	Lumpinee Stadium	Bangkok, Thailand	Decision	5	3:00
1988-05-31	Loss	(Thailand) Karuhat Sor.Supawan	Lumpinee Stadium	Bangkok, Thailand	Decision	5	3:00
1988-03-25	Win	(Thailand) Songchainoi Por.Somjit	Onesongchai, Lumpinee Stadium	Bangkok, Thailand	Decision	5	3:00
1988-03-04	Win	(Thailand) Pongsiri Por.Ruamrudee	Lumpinee Stadium	Bangkok, Thailand	KO	2	
1988-01-16	Win	(Thailand) Sathit Dechawalit		Hat Yai, Thailand	KO	5	
1987-10-27	Loss	(Thailand) Karuhat Sor.Supawan	Lumpinee Stadium	Bangkok, Thailand	Decision	5	3:00
1987-08-11	Loss	(Thailand) Saeksan Sitjomthong	Lumpinee Stadium	Bangkok, Thailand	Decision	5	3:00
1987-07-03	Win	(Thailand) Mongkolchai Ekamorn	Lumpinee Stadium	Bangkok, Thailand	Decision	5	3:00
1987-06-09	Loss	(Thailand) Khunphon Sor.Wattana	Lumpinee Stadium	Bangkok, Thailand	Decision	5	3:00
1987-05-19	Loss	(Thailand) Boontiang Bualuangprakanpai	Onesongchai, Lumpinee Stadium	Bangkok, Thailand	Decision	5	3:00
1987-03-31	Loss	(Thailand) Pairojnoi Sor.Siamchai	Lumpinee Stadium	Bangkok, Thailand	Decision	5	3:00
1987-02-20	Win	(Thailand) Kompayak Singmanee	Fairtex, Lumpinee Stadium	Bangkok, Thailand	Decision	5	3:00
1987-01-	Win	(Thailand) Khunphon Sor.Wattana	Lumpinee Stadium	Bangkok, Thailand	KO	4	
1986-11-18	Win	(Thailand) Superlek Chor.Sawat	Lumpinee Stadium	Bangkok, Thailand	Decision	5	3:00
1986-10-	Win	(Thailand) Chaichan Sor.Sonklin	Lumpinee Stadium	Bangkok, Thailand	Decision	5	3:00
1986-10-07	Win	(Thailand) Pharuatnoi Sitchunthong	Lumpinee Stadium	Bangkok, Thailand	Decision	5	3:00
1986-09-16	NC	(Thailand) Sornnarai Kiatiyangtan	Lumpinee Stadium	Bangkok, Thailand	Ref.stop. (Sornnarai dismissed)	5	
1986-08-23	Win	(Thailand) Niwet Sor.Sawat	Lumpinee Stadium	Bangkok, Thailand	KO	1	
1986-	Win	(Thailand) Numchok Sor.Lamjiak	Lumpinee Stadium	Bangkok, Thailand	Decision	5	3:00
1986-	Win	(Thailand) Chamnandej Chor.Kanthong	Lumpinee Stadium	Bangkok, Thailand	Decision	5	3:00
1986-	Win	(Thailand) Chamnandej Chor.Kanthong	Lumpinee Stadium	Bangkok, Thailand	Decision	5	3:00
1986-	Win	(Thailand) Saenchai Luksamprung	Lumpinee Stadium	Bangkok, Thailand	Decision	5	3:00
1986-	Loss	(Thailand) Arjunjlek Sor.Siamchai	Rajadamnern Stadium	Bangkok, Thailand	Decision	5	3:00
1986-	Win	(Thailand) Pitakchai Fairtex	Lumpinee Stadium	Bangkok, Thailand	Decision	5	3:00
1985-	Loss	(Thailand) Pitakchai Fairtex	Lumpinee Stadium	Bangkok, Thailand	Decision	5	3:00
1985-	Loss	(Thailand) Teeraporn Kiatanan	Lumpinee Stadium	Bangkok, Thailand	Decision	5	3:00
1985-	Win	(Thailand) Thamlek Sittham	Lumpinee Stadium	Bangkok, Thailand	Decision	5	3:00
1985-	Win	(Thailand) Banphot Saksamut	Lumpinee Stadium	Bangkok, Thailand	Decision	5	3:00
1985-	Win	(Thailand) Rungsaktinoi Saktikomkhai	Lumpinee Stadium	Bangkok, Thailand	Decision	5	3:00
1985-	Loss	(Thailand) Banphot Saksamut	Lumpinee Stadium	Bangkok, Thailand	Decision	5	3:00
1985-	Win	(Thailand) Laemsing Kiatpakphanang	Samrong Stadium	Thailand	KO		
1985-	Loss	(Thailand) Khaokheow Kangwanprai	Lumpinee Stadium	Bangkok, Thailand	Decision	5	3:00
1985-03-15	Win	(Thailand) Thepabut Kiatdaosawai	Lumpinee Stadium	Bangkok, Thailand	KO	1	
1985-	Win	(Thailand) Daocharat Ekamit	Lumpinee Stadium	Bangkok, Thailand	KO	3	
1984-12-	Loss	(Thailand) Kongthoraneenoi Saengsakda		Bangkok, Thailand	Decision	5	3:00
1984-11-	Loss	(Thailand) Daothongchai Sityodtong		Bangkok, Thailand	Decision	5	3:00
1984-10-06	Win	(Thailand) Domthong Sor.Prawit	Lumpinee Stadium	Bangkok, Thailand	KO	2	
Major Bangkok Stadium debut.
Legend: Win Loss Draw/No contest Notes
