= Nuathoranee Thongracha =

Thai former professional Muay Thai fighter (born 1971)

- Born: Satien Sangthong; October 25, 1971 (age 55); Ban Phai, Khon Kaen, Thailand
- Native name: เสถียร สังข์ทอง
- Other names: Nuathoranee Sor.Kettalingchan (เหนือธรณี ส.เขตตลิ่งชัน); Nuathoranee Wor.Taweekiat (เหนือธรณี ว.ทวีเกียรติ)
- Nickname: The Wild Rhino (ไอ้แรดดง); Mighty Wild Rhino (แรดดงจอมพลัง)
- Height: 1.67 m (5 ft 6 in)
- Division: Super Featherweight; Lightweight; Super Lightweight
- Style: Muay Thai (Muay Bouk)
- Stance: Orthodox
- Team: Thongracha; Sor.Kettalingchan; Wor.Taweekiat
- Trainer: Yodtong Senanan
- Years active: c. 1980s–1999

Other information
- Occupation: Muay Thai trainer
- Notable students: Masato

Satien Sangthong (Thai: เสถียร สังข์ทอง; born October 25, 1971), known professionally as Nuathoranee Thongracha (Thai: เหนือธรณี ทองราชา), is a Thai former professional Muay Thai fighter. He never won a Lumpinee Stadium or Rajadamnern Stadium title but defeated multiple champions. Nicknamed the "Wild Rhino", he was famous during the 1980s and 1990s for his aggressive style.

== Career ==
Nuathoranee is considered one of the most successful kickboxers in the late 1980s and 1990s under events organized by popular promoter Songchai Rattanasuban.

The famous opponents he has fought against include Kongtoranee Payakaroon, Wangchannoi Sor Palangchai, Jaroenthong Kiatbanchong, Namkabuan Nongkeepahuyuth, Therdkiat Sitthepitak, Pairot Wor.Wolapon, Namphon Nongkeepahuyuth, Superlek Sorn E-Sarn, Jongsanan Fairtex, Sakmongkol Sithchuchok, Mathee Jadeepitak, Chandet Sor Prantalay, Sangtiennoi Sor.Rungroj, Orono Por.MuangUbon, and Rajasak Sor.Vorapin.

In his fight with Den Muangsurin in 1993, the ref called two eight counts against Nuathoranee but he'd come back to win the bout by technical knockout in the 3rd round due to a cut caused by an elbow.

After retirement, he turned into a trainer and later moved to Japan. One of his most successful students is K-1 MAX champion Masato Kobayashi.

== Titles and accomplishments ==
- Lumpinee Stadium
  - 1993 Lumpinee Stadium Fight of the Year (vs. Den Muangsurin)

== Fight record ==
Muay Thai record
Date	Result	Opponent	Event	Location	Method	Round	Time
1999-01-02	Loss	(Thailand) Natee Sor.Khamsing	Lumpinee Stadium	Bangkok, Thailand	Decision	5	3:00
1997-	Loss	(Thailand) Wanlop		Bangkok, Thailand	Decision	5	3:00
1997-07-	Loss	(Thailand) Orono Por.MuangUbon	Lumpinee Stadium	Bangkok, Thailand	Decision	5	3:00
For Muay Thai World 140 lbs title.
1996-	Loss	(Thailand) Chandet Sor.Prantalay	Lumpinee Stadium	Bangkok, Thailand	Decision	5	3:00
1996-03-16	Win	(Belgium) Noel Van Den Heuvel	MAJKF	Tokyo, Japan	KO		
1995-12-05	Loss	(France) Manu Ntoh (France) Eddy Saban	Onesongchai	Macao	Decision	5	3:00
2 vs 1 handicap match. Ntoh fought the first three rounds and Saban the last two.
1995-10-31	Win	(Thailand) Rainbow Sor.Prantalay	Lumpinee Stadium	Bangkok, Thailand	Decision	5	3:00
1995-03-15	Loss	(Thailand) Angkarndej Por.Paoin	Rajadamnern Stadium	Bangkok, Thailand	Decision	5	3:00
1995-02-01	Win	(Thailand) Rajasak Sor.Vorapin	Rajadamnern Stadium	Bangkok, Thailand	Decision	5	3:00
1994-12-09	Loss	(Thailand) Jongsanan Fairtex	Lumpinee Stadium	Bangkok, Thailand	Decision	5	3:00
1994-11-18	Win	(Thailand) Pomphet Naratreekul	Lumpinee Stadium	Bangkok, Thailand	Decision	5	3:00
1994-10-10	Loss	(Thailand) Sangtiennoi Sor.Rungroj	Lumpinee Stadium	Bangkok, Thailand	Decision	5	3:00
1994-08-	Loss	(Thailand) Orono Por.MuangUbon	Lumpinee Stadium	Bangkok, Thailand	Decision	5	3:00
1994-03-15	Loss	(Thailand) Angkarndej Por.Paoin	Rajadamnern Stadium	Bangkok, Thailand	Decision	5	3:00
1994-02-20	Win	(Thailand) Chinchai Sakdaroon	Channel 7 Stadium	Bangkok, Thailand	Decision	5	3:00
1994-01-31	Loss	(Thailand) Mathee Jadeepitak	Rajadamnern Stadium	Bangkok, Thailand	Decision	5	3:00
1993-12-	Win	(Thailand) Ritthichai Lookchaomaesaitong	Lumpinee Stadium	Bangkok, Thailand	Decision	5	3:00
1993-12-17	Loss	(Thailand) Pomphet Naratreekul	Lumpinee Stadium	Bangkok, Thailand	Decision	5	3:00
1993-11-23	Win	(Thailand) Ritthichai Lookchaomaesaitong	Lumpinee Stadium	Bangkok, Thailand	Decision	5	3:00
1993-09-25	Win	(Thailand) Choodchoi Chuchokchai	Lumpinee Stadium	Bangkok, Thailand	Decision	5	3:00
1993-09-07	Loss	(Thailand) Pairot Wor.Wolapon	Lumpinee Stadium	Bangkok, Thailand	Decision	5	3:00
1993-08-06	Win	(Thailand) Den Muangsurin	Lumpinee Stadium	Bangkok, Thailand	Decision	5	3:00
1993-07-03	Win	(Thailand) Den Muangsurin	Lumpinee Stadium	Bangkok, Thailand	TKO (Doctor stoppage)	3	
1993-05-07	Win	(Thailand) Pairot Wor.Wolapon	Lumpinee Stadium	Bangkok, Thailand	KO (Elbow & Knee)	3	
1993-03-29	Loss	(Thailand) Komphet Lukprabat	Lumpinee Stadium	Bangkok, Thailand	Decision	5	3:00
1993-02-26	Win	(Thailand) Chandet Sor.Prantalay	Lumpinee Stadium	Bangkok, Thailand	Decision	5	3:00
1993-01-29	Loss	(Thailand) Sakmongkol Sithchuchok	Lumpinee Stadium	Bangkok, Thailand	Decision	5	3:00
1992-12-29	Loss	(Thailand) Superlek Sornisaan	Lumpinee Stadium	Bangkok, Thailand	TKO (Doctor Stoppage)	4	
1992-11-20	Loss	(Thailand) Therdkiat Sitthepitak	Lumpinee Stadium	Bangkok, Thailand	Decision	5	3:00
1992-11-06	Win	(Thailand) Jongsanan Fairtex	Lumpinee Stadium	Bangkok, Thailand	Decision	5	3:00
1992-09-11	Win	(Thailand) Boonlai Sor.Thanikul	Lumpinee Stadium	Bangkok, Thailand	Decision	5	3:00
1992-08-14	Loss	(Thailand) Namkabuan Nongkeepahuyuth	OneSongchai, Burswood Casino	Perth, Australia	Decision	5	3:00
For the Lumpinee Stadium Super Featherweight (130 lbs) title.
1992-06-30	Draw	(Thailand) Namkabuan Nongkeepahuyuth	Lumpinee Stadium	Bangkok, Thailand	Decision	5	3:00
1992-05-29	Win	(Thailand) Wangchannoi Sor.Palangchai	Lumpinee Stadium	Bangkok, Thailand	Decision	5	3:00
1992-04-24	Win	(Thailand) Boonlai Sor.Thanikul	Lumpinee Stadium	Bangkok, Thailand	Decision	5	3:00
1992-03-20	Win	(Thailand) Jongsanan Fairtex	Lumpinee Stadium	Bangkok, Thailand	Decision	5	3:00
1991-09-03	Loss	(Thailand) Namkabuan Nongkeepahuyuth	Lumpinee Stadium	Bangkok, Thailand	Decision	5	3:00
1991-08-06	Loss	(Thailand) Namkabuan Nongkeepahuyuth	Lumpinee Stadium	Bangkok, Thailand	Decision	5	3:00
For the Lumpinee Stadium Super Featherweight (130 lbs) title.
1991-05-31	Loss	(Thailand) Sangtiennoi Sor.Rungroj	Lumpinee Stadium	Bangkok, Thailand	Decision	5	3:00
1991-05-10	Win	(Thailand) Sangtiennoi Sor.Rungroj	Lumpinee Stadium	Bangkok, Thailand	Decision	5	3:00
1991-03-05	Win	(Thailand) Jaroenthong Kiatbanchong	Lumpinee Stadium	Bangkok, Thailand	Decision	5	3:00
1991-02-09	Draw	(Thailand) Namphon Nongkeepahuyuth	Lumpinee Stadium	Bangkok, Thailand	Decision	5	3:00
1991-01-21	Loss	(Thailand) Namphon Nongkeepahuyuth	Rajadamnern Stadium	Bangkok, Thailand	Decision	5	3:00
1990-12-11	Win	(Thailand) Samranthong Kiatbanchong	Lumpinee Stadium	Bangkok, Thailand	Decision	5	3:00
1990-11-	Win	(Thailand) Sakmongkol Sithchuchok	Lumpinee Stadium	Bangkok, Thailand	Decision	5	3:00
1990-10-24	Win	(Thailand) Thanooin Chor.Chuchart	Lumpinee Stadium	Bangkok, Thailand	Decision	5	3:00
1990-09-22	Win	(Thailand) Thanooin Chor.Chuchart	Lumpinee Stadium	Bangkok, Thailand	Decision	5	3:00
1990-09-	Win	(Thailand) Samingnoi Kiatkumchai	Rajadamnern Stadium	Bangkok, Thailand	Decision	5	3:00
1990-08-	Win	(Thailand) Detsak Sakpradu	Lumpinee Stadium	Bangkok, Thailand	Decision	5	3:00
1990-07-	Win	(Thailand) Ritthichai Lookchaomaesaitong		Chiang Mai, Thailand	Decision	5	3:00
1990-06-	Loss	(Thailand) Panomrunglek Chor.Sawat	Lumpinee Stadium	Bangkok, Thailand	Decision	5	3:00
1990-05-05	Win	(Thailand) Thamwit Saksamut	Lumpinee Stadium	Bangkok, Thailand	Decision	5	3:00
1990-04-	Win	(Thailand) Koratnoi Sakpipat	Lumpinee Stadium	Bangkok, Thailand	Decision	5	3:00
1990-03-	Win	(Thailand) Balangthong Lukborai	Lumpinee Stadium	Bangkok, Thailand	Decision	5	3:00
1990-03-06	Loss	(Thailand) Kongpataya Sityodtong	Lumpinee Stadium	Bangkok, Thailand	KO (High kick)	1	
1990-01-	Win	(Thailand) Krataythong Sor.Singmuslim		Ranong, Thailand	Decision	5	3:00
1989-10-03		(Thailand) Polek Rinkaewphowet	Lumpinee Stadium	Bangkok, Thailand	Decision	5	3:00
1989-05-12	Win	(Thailand) Kukrit Sor.Nayaiyam	Lumpinee Stadium	Bangkok, Thailand	Decision	5	3:00
1989-01-06	Loss	(Thailand) Makhamlek Sitkhunwan	Lumpinee Stadium	Bangkok, Thailand	KO	1	
1988-11-25	Loss	(Thailand) Toto Por.Pongsawang	Lumpinee Stadium	Bangkok, Thailand	KO	4	
1988-09-09	Win	(Thailand) Oley Kiatoneway	Lumpinee Stadium	Bangkok, Thailand	Decision	5	3:00
1988-07-08	Win	(Thailand) Nuathoranee Chor.Rochanachai	Lumpinee Stadium	Bangkok, Thailand	Decision	5	3:00
1988-06-10	Win	(Thailand) Phetmai Na Detudom	Lumpinee Stadium	Bangkok, Thailand	KO	3	
Legend: Win Loss Draw/No contest Notes
