= Oley Kiatoneway =

Thai former professional Muay Thai fighter

- Born: Prasit Thaikaew; April 13, 1973 (age 53); Thung Song, Nakhon Si Thammarat, Thailand
- Native name: ประสิทธิ์ ไทยแก้ว
- Other names: Oley Kiatbanchong; Ole Tor.Chalermchai (โอเล่ ต.เฉลิมชัย)
- Nickname: Black Pearl of the Andaman (ไข่มุกดำอันดามัน); Black Pearl (ไข่มุกดำ); Little Tiger (พยัคฆ์น้อย)
- Height: 171 cm (5 ft 7 in)
- Division: Super Flyweight; Super Bantamweight; Featherweight
- Style: Muay Thai (Muay Femur); Boxing
- Stance: Orthodox
- Team: Saksri Wichai (formerly); Kiatbanchong Gym (formerly); Parunchai Gym (current)
- Trainer: Kru Wichai Plaikwuang; Mai Muangkhon (Kiatbanchong gyms)
- Years active: c. 1985–1995

Professional boxing record
- Total: 4
- Wins: 2
- By knockout: 1
- Losses: 2
- By knockout: 2

Kickboxing record
- Total: 105
- Wins: 80
- Losses: 25

Other information
- Occupation: Muay Thai trainer
- Notable students: Chalam Parunchai; Dam Parunchai; Saen Parunchai
- Boxing record from BoxRec

Prasit Thaikaew (Thai: ประสิทธิ์ ไทยแก้ว; born April 13, 1973), known professionally as Oley Kiatoneway (Thai: โอเล่ห์ เกียรติวันเวย์), is a Thai former professional Muay Thai fighter and boxer. He is a former Lumpinee Stadium Super Flyweight Champion who was famous during the 1980s and 1990s. Nicknamed the "Black Pearl of the Andaman", he was especially known for his evasive movement and is considered amongst the greatest fighters in Muay Thai history.

Nowadays he works as a Muay Thai trainer at the Parunchai camp in his hometown of Thung Song. His students include elite fighters such as Chalam Parunchai, Dam Parunchai, and Saen Parunchai.

== Biography and career ==
=== Early life ===
Thaikaew was born on April 13, 1973 into a poor family living in tambon Pak Phraek in Thung Song district, Nakhon Si Thammarat province. He was inspired to become a fighter by Wuttichai Chuchokchai, a Muay Thai champion from the Thung Song branch of the Kiatbanchong gyms. Initially, Thaikaew's family was disinterested in Muay Thai, so he secretly began training under Kru Wichai Plaikwuang in the small, ill-equipped Saksri Wichai camp near his home. Plaikwuang then gave him the ring name of Oley (โอเล่ห์). He would have his first fight at the age of 12 and won 100 baht.

Oley later joined the Kiatbanchong branch in his hometown where he would become teammates with future yodmuay (top fighters) such as Jaroensap, Jaroenthong, and Samranthong. The Kiatbanchong gyms were a brand of respected Muay Thai gyms owned by Chuchok Chukaewruang AKA Mai Muangkhon. Another Kiatbanchong branch named "International Muay Thai School" opened in Bangkok where Oley and his teammates would move to. He alternatively went by the ring name of Oley Kiatbanchong.

Oley began fighting in the general Bangkok area at the age 15 in the Omnoi and Rangsit stadiums. After knocking out Chanoi Petchnaka and beating Rao Rajanarit on points, he was scouted and hired by Songchai Rattanasuban, the owner of Onesongchai, and began fighting primarily in the Lumpinee Stadium. In the late 1980s, he began to be matched up against elite competition such as "The Ring Genius" Namkabuan Nongkeepahuyuth and "The Powerful Rhino" Nuathoranee Thongraja. After winning by a large margin against Namkabuan, the Thai media nicknamed him "Payaknoi" (Little Tiger).

=== Fighting style ===
Oley was nicknamed "The Black Pearl of Andaman" or simply "Black Pearl," a colloquialism for rare gems about the fact that there were few fighters in the Thai circuit who had a similar fighting style as his. Oley was not a physically powerful fighter like some of his opponents and thus he relied on his technique. He was a Muay Femur or rope-a-dope fighter who was skilled in evasion, punching, and head kicks. Oley's skill and his ability to mix Western boxing techniques with his Muay Thai fighting style resulted in him being compared to Samart Payakaroon as well as Poot Lorlek.

His skill with evasion incited praise from the Thai audiences. He would employ the use of head movement to dodge punches, redirection of his opponents as they attacked, and, to avoid kicks, he would lean back to the point that his torso would be parallel to the floor as can be seen in his fights against Boonlai Sor.Thanikul or Namkabuan Nongkeepahuyuth.

=== Peak of popularity ===
Due to his dynamic and evasive style, he became a popular and successful fighter during the golden era of Muay Thai. He was able to win against other yodmuay (elite fighters) such as Langsuan Panyuthaphum, Superlek Sorn E-Sarn, and Dokmaipah Por.Pongsawang. Oley has stated that the fight where he was hurt the most was his first fight against Boonlai Sor.Thanikul, where Oley was ahead on points until Boonlai knocked him down in the 4th round. He lost the fight on points and had to be hospitalized for a headache afterward. 1 month later, Oley knocked out Seiji Sugiwara in Japan.

He won the Lumpinee Junior Bantamweight title (115 lbs/52.16 kg) in his rematch against Boonlai and successfully defended it against "The Top Master" Karuhat Sor.Supawan in a Onesongchai show in New Zealand. Both Oley and Namkabuan Nongkeepahuyuth were known for their 6-fight rivalry with both Muay Femur fighters securing 3 victories against each other.

His level of fame during his prime would result in the area around the ring becoming crowded by a stream of spectators when he entered it. December 1992 to August 1993 was the most significant period of Oley's career as he had a 7-fight winning streak against the best fighters of the featherweight division (126 lbs/57.15 kg) including but not limited to Wangchannoi Sor.Palangchai and Chamuekpet Hapalang. During this period, Oley knocked out "The King of Lumpinee" Therdkiat Sitthepitak and was awarded his highest purse of ฿250,000 (equivalent to ฿496,168 in 2020) for doing so.

=== Decline and later years ===
After his successful run from 1987 to 1993, Oley began to take fewer fights in 1994 and onwards. He had his last Bangkok fight against Jompoplek Sor.Sumalee in 1995 and lost on points. Afterwards, as Oley's physical condition began to worsen, he would have only several fights in southern Thailand, performing worse than before. In professional boxing, Oley had former WBC world Flyweight champion Venice Borkhorsor as his trainer. He fought a total of 4 boxing bouts with 2 wins. In his 4th and final boxing fight, he was set to compete for the PABA Super Bantamweight title against Russia's Alexander Pak in his native province of Nakhon Si Thammarat in 1995. Oley lost by knockout in the first round.

Oley retired due to his growing disinterest with Muay Thai. He did not involve himself with combat sports for a long period of time as he was running small family restaurants in his hometown of Thung Song. He would later become a Muay Thai trainer at the Parunchai gym in Thung Song where he would become the coach of Lumpinee champions Saen Parunchai and Chalam Parunchai. His goal as a Muay Thai trainer is to give children a way to earn money so that they may go to school. Oley has cited fellow Muay Femur fighter and former teammate Jaroenthong Kiatbanchong as his favorite Muay Thai fighter.

== Titles and honour ==
- Lumpinee Stadium
  - 1990 Lumpinee Stadium Super Flyweight (115 lbs) Champion
    - One successful title defense
- Awards
  - 1989 Muay Siam Journalist Rising Star Award

== Fight record ==
Muay Thai Record (Incomplete)
around 80 Wins, 25 Losses
Date	Result	Opponent	Event	Location	Method	Round	Time
1995-06-07	Win	(Thailand) Hansuk Prasathinpanomrung	Rajadamnern Stadium	Bangkok, Thailand	KO (Left hook)	2	
1995-03-24	Loss	(Thailand) Jompoplek Sor.Sumalee	Lumpinee Stadium	Bangkok, Thailand	Decision	5	3:00
1993-12-24	Loss	(Thailand) Mathee Jadeepitak	Fairtex, Lumpinee Stadium	Bangkok, Thailand	Decision	5	3:00
1993-11-30	Loss	(Thailand) Namkabuan Nongkeepahuyuth	Onesongchai, Lumpinee Stadium	Bangkok, Thailand	Decision	5	3:00
1993-10-05	Loss	(Thailand) Therdkiat Sitthepitak	Onesongchai, Lumpinee Stadium	Bangkok, Thailand	Decision (Majority)	5	3:00
For the vacant Lumpinee Stadium Featherweight (126 lbs) title.
1993-08-06	Win	(Thailand) Therdkiat Sitthepitak	Onesongchai, Lumpinee Stadium	Bangkok, Thailand	TKO (3 knockdowns, punches)	1	
1993-07-11	Win	(Thailand) Boonlai Sor.Thanikul	OneSongchai	Nakhon Sawan, Thailand	Decision	5	3:00
1993-06-11	Win	(Thailand) Namkabuan Nongkeepahuyuth	Lumpinee Stadium	Bangkok, Thailand	Decision	5	3:00
1993-04-24	Win	(Thailand) Superlek Sornisaan	Onesongchai, Lumpinee Stadium	Bangkok, Thailand	Decision	5	3:00
1993-03-23	Win	(Thailand) Chamuekpet Hapalang	Lumpinee Stadium	Bangkok, Thailand	Decision	5	3:00
1993-02-05	Win	(Thailand) Wangchannoi Sor.Palangchai	Lumpinee Stadium	Bangkok, Thailand	Decision	5	3:00
1992-12-27	Win	(Thailand) Dokmaipa Por.Pongsawang	Lumpinee Stadium	Bangkok, Thailand	Decision	5	3:00
1992-12-05	Loss	(Thailand) Chamuekpet Hapalang	King's Birthday	Bangkok, Thailand	KO (Punches)	4	
1992-10-13	Loss	(Thailand) Boonlai Sor.Thanikul	OneSongchai, Lumpinee Stadium	Bangkok, Thailand	Decision	5	3:00
For the Lumpinee Stadium Super Bantamweight (122 lbs) title.
1992-07-21	Loss	(Thailand) Superlek Sornisaan	Lumpinee Stadium	Bangkok, Thailand	KO (Punches)	3	
1992-06-30	Loss	(Thailand) Boonlai Sor.Thanikul	Lumpinee Stadium	Bangkok, Thailand	Decision	5	3:00
1992-05-29	Win	(Thailand) Ritthichai Lookchaomaesaitong	Lumpinee Stadium	Bangkok, Thailand	Decision	5	3:00
1992-04-24	Win	(Thailand) Ritthichai Lookchaomaesaitong	Lumpinee Stadium	Bangkok, Thailand	Decision	5	3:00
1992-03-10	Loss	(Thailand) Cherry Sor.Wanich	Lumpinee Stadium	Bangkok, Thailand	KO (Knees)	4	
1992-02-14	Loss	(Thailand) Panomrung Sit Sor.Wor.Por.	Lumpinee Stadium	Bangkok, Thailand	Decision	5	3:00
1991-12-27	Win	(Thailand) Dokmaipa Por.Pongsawang	Lumpinee Stadium	Bangkok, Thailand	Decision	5	3:00
1991-04-05	Win	(Thailand) Langsuan Panyuthaphum	OneSongchai, Lumpinee Stadium	Bangkok, Thailand	Decision	5	3:00
1991-03-05	Win	(Thailand) Wangchannoi Sor.Palangchai	Lumpinee Stadium	Bangkok, Thailand	Decision	5	3:00
1991-01-21	Loss	(Thailand) Wangchannoi Sor.Palangchai	Rajadamnern Stadium	Bangkok, Thailand	Decision	5	3:00
For a 600,000 baht side-bet.
1990-12-11	Loss	(Thailand) Namkabuan Nongkeepahuyuth	Lumpinee Stadium	Bangkok, Thailand	Decision	5	3:00
1990-11-20	Win	(Thailand) Detduang Por.Pongsawang	Onesongchai, Lumpinee Stadium	Bangkok, Thailand	Decision	5	3:00
1990-10-07	Win	(Thailand) Karuhat Sor.Supawan	OneSongchai	New Zealand	Decision	5	3:00
Defends the Lumpinee Stadium Super Flyweight (115 lbs) title.
1990-09-25	Win	(Thailand) Dokmaipa Por.Pongsawang	Fairtex + Onesongchai, Lumpinee Stadium	Bangkok, Thailand	Decision	5	3:00
1990-08-31	Loss	(Thailand) Namkabuan Nongkeepahuyuth	Onesongchai, Lumpinee Stadium	Bangkok, Thailand	Decision	5	3:00
1990-08-07	Win	(Thailand) Dokmaipa Por.Pongsawang	Lumpinee Stadium	Bangkok, Thailand	KO	3	
1990-07-10	Loss	(Thailand) Dokmaipa Por.Pongsawang	OneSongchai, Lumpinee Stadium	Bangkok, Thailand	Decision	5	3:00
1990-06-08	Win	(Thailand) Boonlai Sor.Thanikul	Lumpinee Stadium	Bangkok, Thailand	Decision	5	3:00
Wins the Lumpinee Stadium Super Flyweight (115 lbs) title.
1990-05-18	Win	(Japan) Seiji Sugawara	MAJKF	Tokyo, Japan	KO (Right high kick)	2	
1990-04-24	Loss	(Thailand) Boonlai Sor.Thanikul	OneSongchai, Lumpinee Stadium	Bangkok, Thailand	Decision	5	3:00
For the Lumpinee Stadium Super Flyweight (115 lbs) title.
1990-04-10	Win	(Thailand) Panphet Muangsurin	Lumpinee Stadium	Bangkok, Thailand	Decision	5	3:00
1990-03-06	Win	(Thailand) Langsuan Panyuthaphum	OneSongchai, Lumpinee Stadium	Bangkok, Thailand	Decision	5	3:00
1990-02-06	Win	(Thailand) Namkabuan Nongkeepahuyuth	Lumpinee Stadium	Bangkok, Thailand	Decision	5	3:00
1990-01-19	Win	(Thailand) Tanongchai Charoenmuang	Lumpinee Stadium	Bangkok, Thailand	Decision	5	3:00
1989-11-28	Loss	(Thailand) Karuhat Sor.Supawan	Lumpinee Stadium	Bangkok, Thailand	Decision	5	3:00
1989-11-07	Win	(Thailand) Pairojnoi Sor Siamchai	Lumpinee Stadium	Bangkok, Thailand	Decision	5	3:00
1989-10-06	Draw	(Thailand) Panphet Muangsurin	Lumpinee Stadium	Bangkok, Thailand	Decision	5	3:00
1989-09-08	Win	(Thailand) Seesot Sahakanohsot	Lumpinee Stadium	Bangkok, Thailand	KO (Punches)	1	
1989-08-15	Win	(Thailand) Saeksan Sitjomthong	Lumpinee Stadium	Bangkok, Thailand	TKO (Punches)	2	
1989-07-20	Win	(Thailand) Pennoi Chuwattana	Rajadamnern Stadium	Bangkok, Thailand	KO (Punches)	1	
1989-05-30	Loss	(Thailand) Petchan Sor.Bodin	Lumpinee Stadium	Bangkok, Thailand	Decision	5	3:00
1989-04-07	Loss	(Thailand) Puja Sithuanthong	Lumpinee Stadium	Bangkok, Thailand	Decision	5	3:00
1989-03-10	Win	(Thailand) Makhamlek Sitkhunwaen	Lumpinee Stadium	Bangkok, Thailand	Decision	5	3:00
1989-02-17	Win	(Thailand) Dejrit Sor.Ploenchit	Lumpinee Stadium	Bangkok, Thailand	Decision	5	3:00
1988-11-04	Loss	(Thailand) Songchainoi Por.Somjitair	OneSongchai, Lumpinee Stadium	Bangkok, Thailand	KO	3	
1988-10-11	Win	(Thailand) Kawao Por.Pongkiait	OneSongchai, Lumpinee Stadium	Bangkok, Thailand	Decision	5	3:00
1988-09-09	Loss	(Thailand) Nuathoranee Sitchainarin	OneSongchai, Lumpinee Stadium	Bangkok, Thailand	Decision	5	3:00
1988-08-05	Win	(Thailand) Nuathoranee Chor Rojanachai	OneSongchai, Lumpinee Stadium	Bangkok, Thailand	Decision	5	3:00
1988-05-03	Win	(Thailand) Namkabuan Nongkeepahuyuth	OneSongchai, Lumpinee Stadium	Bangkok, Thailand	Decision	5	3:00
1988-	Win	(Thailand) Paineung Singpracha	OneSongchai, Lumpinee Stadium	Bangkok, Thailand	Decision	5	3:00
1988-	Win	(Thailand) Rungrueng Kiatanan	OneSongchai, Lumpinee Stadium	Bangkok, Thailand	KO (High Kick)		
1987-	Loss	(Thailand) Rungrueng Kiatanan	OneSongchai, Lumpinee Stadium	Bangkok, Thailand	Decision	5	3:00
1987-	Win	(Thailand) Daochai Sakdeeweecha	OneSongchai	Hat Yai, Thailand	Decision	5	3:00
1987-	Win	(Thailand) Petchnampeung Chakraphon	OneSongchai, Lumpinee Stadium	Bangkok, Thailand	TKO	2	
1987-	Win	(Thailand) Kompichit Singpracha	OneSongchai, Lumpinee Stadium	Bangkok, Thailand	Decision	5	3:00
1987-	Win	(Thailand) Lao Rojanarit	Rangsit Stadium	Rangsit, Thailand	Decision	5	3:00
1987-	Win	(Thailand) Chenoi Petchnaka	Omnoi Stadium	Samut Sakhon, Thailand	KO		
1987-	Win	(Thailand) Djamphangoen Prapatmotor	Omnoi Stadium	Samut Sakhon, Thailand	Decision	5	3:00
1986-	Draw	(Thailand) Anantadej Singsaithong		Thailand	Decision	5	3:00
1986-	Win	(Thailand) Danangnoi Sor Meandee		Thailand	Decision	5	3:00
1986-	Win	(Thailand) Phetlek Jor Kiet Gym		Thailand	Decision	5	3:00
1986-	Win	(Thailand) Anantasak Singkohyuan		Thailand	Decision	5	3:00
	Win	(Thailand) Daoden KietineeGym		Thailand	Decision	5	3:00
	Win	(Thailand) Kwanyuen Dechawalit		Thailand	Decision	5	3:00
	Win	(Thailand) Huahinlek Lukrawee		Thailand	Decision	5	3:00
	Win	(Thailand) Pajonsuk Kietidanpleung		Thailand	Decision	5	3:00
Legend: Win Loss Draw/No contest Notes
