= Kruekchai Kiatyongyut =

Thai former professional Muay Thai fighter

- Born: Surachai Sukhanthong; November 16, 1970 (age 55); Khanap Nak, Pak Phanang, Nakhon Si Thanmarat, Thailand
- Native name: สุรชัย สุขันทอง
- Other names: Kruekchai Sor.Kettalingchan (เกริกชัย ศ.เขตตลิ่งชัน); Kruekchai BualuangInsurance (เกริกชัย บัวหลวงประกันภัย); Kruekchai Kaewsamrit (เกริกชัย แก้วสัมฤทธิ์)
- Nickname: Elbow Chisel (ศอกสิ่ว)
- Division: Light Flyweight
- Style: Muay Thai (Muay Khao)
- Stance: Southpaw
- Team: Sor.Kettalingchan; Kiatyongyuth; Kaewsamrit

Other information
- Occupation: Police officer

Surachai Sukhanthong (Thai: สุรชัย สุขันทอง; born November 16, 1970), known professionally as Kruekchai Kiatyongyut (Thai: เกริกชัย เกียรติยงยุทธ), is a Thai former professional Muay Thai fighter. He is a former Lumpinee Stadium Light Flyweight Champion who was active during the 1980s and 1990s.

== Biography and career ==
He trained at the Sor.Kettalingchan, Kiatyongyut, and Kaewsamrit gyms.

He fought during the Golden Era of Muay Thai against many notable fighters including Karuhat Sor.Supawan, Hippy Singmanee, Namkabuan Nongkeepahuyuth, Chatchai Paiseetong, Nungubon Sitlerchai, Jaroensap Kiatbanchong, Mathee Jadeepitak, Chandet Sor.Prantalay, Orono Por.MuangUbon, Sak Kaoponlek, Chainoi Muangsurin, Tukatathong Por.Pongsawang, and Pairojnoi Sor.Siamchai.

Since retiring from competition, he has worked as a police officer in Bangkok.

== Titles and honours ==
- Lumpinee Stadium
  - 1990 Lumpinee Stadium Light Flyweight (108 lbs) Champion

== Fight record ==
Muay Thai Record (Incomplete)
Date	Result	Opponent	Event	Location	Method	Round	Time
1995-06-30	Loss	(Thailand) Jompoplek Sor.Sumalee	Lumpinee Stadium	Bangkok, Thailand	Decision	5	3:00
1995-06-10	Loss	(Thailand) Lamnamoon Sor.Sumalee	Lumpinee Stadium	Bangkok, Thailand	Decision	5	3:00
1995-05-05	Loss	(Thailand) Saennapha Fairtex	Rajadamnern Stadium	Bangkok, Thailand	Decision	5	3:00
1995-04-10	Win	(Thailand) Silapin Thammachat	Rajadamnern Stadium	Bangkok, Thailand	Decision	5	3:00
1995-03-28	Loss	(Thailand) Apiwat Por.Pleumkamol	Rajadamnern Stadium	Bangkok, Thailand	Decision	5	3:00
1995-02-13	Loss	(Thailand) Choengnoen Sitphutthapim	Rajadamnern Stadium	Bangkok, Thailand	Decision	5	3:00
1994-12-12	Win	(Thailand) Thapisuj Sor.Maliwan	Rajadamnern Stadium	Bangkok, Thailand	Decision	5	3:00
1994-09-20	Loss	(Thailand) Nungubon Sitlerchai	Lumpinee Stadium	Bangkok, Thailand	Decision	5	3:00
1994-08-01	Loss	(Thailand) Khunsuk Sunwelarewadee	Rajadamnern Stadium	Bangkok, Thailand	Decision	5	3:00
1994-05-30	Win	(Thailand) Boonlong Sor.Thanikul	Rajadamnern Stadium	Bangkok, Thailand	Decision	5	3:00
1994-02-15	Loss	(Thailand) Kaoponglek Luksuratham	Lumpinee Stadium	Bangkok, Thailand	Decision	5	3:00
1993-12-24	Win	(Thailand) Charoenwit Kiatbanchong	Lumpinee Stadium	Bangkok, Thailand	KO (Punches)	3	
1993-12-03	Loss	(Thailand) Peemai Or.Yutthanakorn	Lumpinee Stadium	Bangkok, Thailand	Decision	5	3:00
1993-11-16	Win	(Thailand) Jaroensap Kiatbanchong	Lumpinee Stadium	Bangkok, Thailand	Decision	5	3:00
1993-10-05	Loss	(Thailand) Jompoplek Sor.Sumalee	Lumpinee Stadium	Bangkok, Thailand	Decision	5	3:00
1993-08-13	Loss	(Thailand) Kesemlek QualityGym	Lumpinee Stadium	Bangkok, Thailand	Decision	5	3:00
1993-07-27	Win	(Thailand) Jompoplek Sor.Sumalee	Onesongchai, Lumpinee Stadium	Bangkok, Thailand	Decision	5	3:00
1993-07-06	Loss	(Thailand) Tanongsak Sor.Prantalay	Lumpinee Stadium	Bangkok, Thailand	Decision	5	3:00
1993-05-07	Loss	(Thailand) Chatchai Paiseetong	Lumpinee Stadium	Bangkok, Thailand	Decision	5	3:00
1992-12-29	Loss	(Thailand) Karuhat Sor.Supawan	Lumpinee Stadium	Bangkok, Thailand	TKO (Doctor stoppage)	3	
1992-12-04	Win	(Thailand) Chainoi Muangsurin	Lumpinee Stadium	Bangkok, Thailand	Decision	5	3:00
1992-11-06	Win	(Thailand) Singhao Tor.Hintok	Lumpinee Stadium	Bangkok, Thailand	Decision	5	3:00
1992-02-05	Loss	(Thailand) Jompoplek Sor.Sumalee	Lumpinee Stadium	Bangkok, Thailand	Decision	5	3:00
1991-10-20	Loss	(Thailand) Chodchoi Chuchokchai		Phatthalung province, Thailand	Decision	5	3:00
1991-10-08	Loss	(Thailand) Saennapha Fairtex	Lumpinee Stadium	Bangkok, Thailand	Decision	5	3:00
1991-09-07	Loss	(Thailand) Mathee Jadeepitak	Rajadamnern Stadium	Bangkok, Thailand	Decision	5	3:00
1991-05-04	Loss	(Thailand) Panphet Muangsurin	Lumpinee Stadium	Bangkok, Thailand	KO (Punches)	1	
1991-04-18	Loss	(Thailand) Duangsompong Por.Pongsawang	Rajadamnern Stadium	Bangkok, Thailand	Decision	5	3:00
1991-03-13	Loss	(Thailand) Thanooin Chor.Cheuchart	Rajadamnern Stadium	Bangkok, Thailand	Decision	5	3:00
1991-02-12	Win	(Thailand) Chandet Sor.Prantalay	Lumpinee Stadium	Bangkok, Thailand	Decision	5	3:00
1991-01-25	Draw	(Thailand) Chandet Sor.Prantalay	Lumpinee Stadium	Bangkok, Thailand	Decision	5	3:00
1991-01-04	Loss	(Thailand) Duangsompong Por.Pongsawang	Rajadamnern Stadium	Bangkok, Thailand	Decision	5	3:00
1990-08-31	Win	(Thailand) Tukatathong Por.Pongsawang	Lumpinee Stadium	Bangkok, Thailand	TKO (referee stoppage)	1	
Wins the Lumpinee Stadium Light Flyweight (108 lbs) title.
1990-12-04	Loss	(Thailand) Pairojnoi Sor.Siamchai	Lumpinee Stadium	Bangkok, Thailand	Decision	5	3:00
1990-09-28	Loss	(Thailand) Toto Por.Pongsawang	Lumpinee Stadium	Bangkok, Thailand	Decision	5	3:00
1990-06-08	Loss	(Thailand) Pairojnoi Sor.Siamchai	Lumpinee Stadium	Bangkok, Thailand	Decision	5	3:00
1990-05-15	Win	(Thailand) Singhao Tor.Hintok	Onesongchai, Lumpinee Stadium	Bangkok, Thailand	Decision	5	3:00
1990-03-19	Loss	(Thailand) Saengdao Kiatanan	Rajadamnern Stadium	Bangkok, Thailand	Decision	5	3:00
1990-02-24	Win	(Thailand) Hippy Singmanee	Lumpinee Stadium	Bangkok, Thailand	Decision	5	3:00
1990-01-15	Loss	(Thailand) Orono Por.MuangUbon	Lumpinee Stadium	Bangkok, Thailand	Decision	5	3:00
1989-11-03	Loss	(Thailand) Orono Por.MuangUbon	Lumpinee Stadium	Bangkok, Thailand	Decision	5	3:00
1989-09-18	Win	(Thailand) Orono Por.MuangUbon	Lumpinee Stadium	Bangkok, Thailand	Decision	5	3:00
1989-05-27	Loss	(Thailand) Namkabuan Nongkeepahuyuth	Lumpinee Stadium	Bangkok, Thailand	Decision	5	3:00
1987-09-02	Win	(Thailand) Chaichan Technobangkapi	Rajadamnern Stadium	Bangkok, Thailand	Decision	5	3:00
1987-04-07	Win	(Thailand) Khiaowannoi Sor.Kanokrat	Lumpinee Stadium	Bangkok, Thailand	Decision	5	3:00
Legend: Win Loss Draw/No contest Notes
