= Lamnamoon Sor.Sumalee =

Thai professional Muay Thai fighter

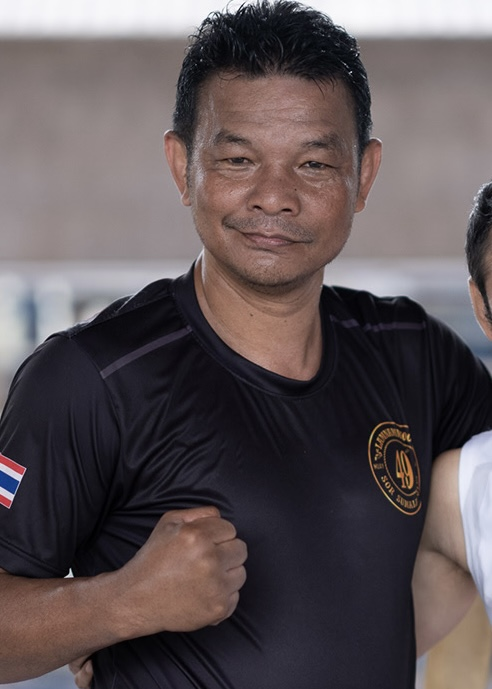
- Lamnamoon in 2023
- Born: Kukhrit Kamolroek; May 5, 1973 (age 53); Ubon Ratchathani (now Amnat Charoen), Thailand
- Native name: คึกฤทธิ์ กมลฤกษ์
- Other names: Lamnamoon Sitpakphanang (ลำน้ำมูล สิทธิ์ปากพนัง)
- Nickname: Lord Vetala Knees (ขุนเข่าเวตาล)
- Height: 175 cm (5 ft 9 in)
- Division: Super Flyweight; Bantamweight; Super Bantamweight; Featherweight; Super Featherweight; Lightweight
- Style: Muay Thai (Muay Khao)
- Stance: Orthodox
- Team: Sor.Sumalee Gym
- Years active: c. 1987–2004

Kickboxing record
- Total: 200
- Wins: 150
- Losses: 46
- Draws: 4

Other information
- Occupation: Muay Thai fighter (retired); Muay Thai trainer

Kukhrit Kamolroek (Thai: คึกฤทธิ์ กมลฤกษ์; born May 5, 1973), known professionally as Lamnamoon Sor.Sumalee (Thai: ลำน้ำมูล ส.สุมาลี), is a Thai former professional Muay Thai fighter. He is a former four-time Lumpinee Stadium champion across three weight classes who was famous during the 1990s and 2000s. Nicknamed "Lord Vetala Knees", he was famous for his relentless pressure, clinch, and knees.

== Biography & career ==
Lamnamoon started Muay Thai at the age of 14 at the Sit Pongtap gym. He had his first fight the same year for which he was paid 100 baht. He moved to Bangkok two years later to join the Sor.Sumalee gym. Lamnamoon spent his entire career at the Sor.Sumalee gym alongside other champions such as Panomrunglek Por Chaiwat, Superlek Sorn E-Sarn and Jompoplek Sor Sumalee. Known for his vicious knees and lang frame Lamnamoon was a very popular fighter who captured four Lumpinee Stadium titles at 3 different weights during the 1990s. His highest purse was of 200,000 baht.
He had memorable wins over notable fighters such as Langsuan Panyuthaphum, Chatchai Paiseetong, Jaroensap Kiatbanchong, Samkor Kiatmontep, Mathee Jadeepitak and Attachai Fairtex.

After his retirement Lamnamoon became a Muay Thai trainer, teaching at Sor.Sumalee and Evolve MMA in Singapore. After coming back to Thailand he opened his own gym in 2015 called Lamnamoon Muay Thai in the Ubon Ratchathani Province. His best student is Robert Sor Thanabowon who won the channel 7 stadium 105 lbs belt in 2019.

== Titles and accomplishments ==
- Lumpinee Stadium
  - 1993 Lumpinee Stadium Super Flyweight (115 lbs) Champion
    - One successful title defense
  - 1996 Lumpinee Stadium Featherweight (126 lbs) Champion
    - One successful title defense
  - 1997 Lumpinee Stadium Super Featherweight (130 lbs) Champion
    - One successful title defense
  - 1999 Lumpinee Stadium Super Featherweight (130 lbs) Champion
- Rajadamnern Stadium
  - 1997 Rajadamnern Stadium Fight of the Year (vs Rambojiew Por Thubtim)
- World Professional Kickboxing League
  - 2004 WPKL World 135 lbs Champion

== Fight record ==
Muay Thai Record (Incomplete)
150 Wins, 46 Losses, 4 Draws
Date	Result	Opponent	Event	Location	Method	Round	Time
2004-03-27	Win	(Netherlands) Mustapha Ziani		Rotterdam, Netherlands	Decision	5	3:00
Wins the WPKL World Lightweight (135 lbs) title.
2004-	Loss	(Thailand) Attachai Fairtex	Lumpinee Stadium	Bangkok, Thailand	KO	1	1:36
2003-10-23	Loss	(Thailand) Jaroenrit Sitjakraphan	Rajadamnern Stadium	Bangkok, Thailand	Decision	5	3:00
	Win	(Thailand) Wanpichit Sitjamlong		Bangkok, Thailand	Decision	5	3:00
2001-09-06	Loss	(Thailand) Khunpinit Kiattawan	Lumpinee Stadium	Bangkok, Thailand	Decision	5	3:00
2001-06-07	Win	(Thailand) Khunpinit Kiattawan	Rajadamnern Stadium	Bangkok, Thailand	Decision	5	3:00
2001-03-07	Win	(Thailand) Khunpinit Kiattawan	Lumpinee Stadium	Bangkok, Thailand	Decision	5	3:00
2001-01-07	Loss	(Thailand) Saengmorakot Waenatsapid	Muay Thai World Heritage Battle	Thailand	Decision	5	3:00
2000-06-02	Loss	(Thailand) Attachai Fairtex	Lumpinee Stadium	Bangkok, Thailand	KO (Left Elbow)	3	
2000-04-08	Loss	(Thailand) Huasai Mor Payakaroon	Lumpinee Stadium	Bangkok, Thailand	Decision	5	3:00
2000-02-29	Loss	(Thailand) Samkor Kiatmontep	Lumpinee Stadium	Bangkok, Thailand	Decision	5	3:00
1999-12-07	Loss	(Thailand) Namsaknoi Yudthagarngamtorn	Lumpinee Stadium	Bangkok, Thailand	KO (Right Cross)	3	
Loses the Lumpinee Stadium Super Featherweight (130 lbs) title.
1999-10-31	Win	(Thailand) Attachai Fairtex		Ubon Ratchathani, Thailand	Decision	5	3:00
1999-09-25	Win	(Thailand) Rambojiew Por Thubtim	Lumpinee Stadium	Bangkok, Thailand	Decision	5	3:00
Wins the vacant Lumpinee Stadium Super Featherweight (130 lbs) title.
1999-08-10	Win	(Thailand) Chokdee Por.Pramuk	Lumpinee Stadium	Bangkok, Thailand	Decision	5	3:00
1999-03-26	Loss	(Thailand) Khunsuk Phetsupaphan	Lumpinee Stadium	Bangkok, Thailand	Decision	5	3:00
Loses the Lumpinee Stadium Super Featherweight (130 lbs) title.
1999-02-10	Loss	(Thailand) Khunsuk Phetsupaphan	Lumpinee Stadium	Bangkok, Thailand	Decision	5	3:00
1998-10-30	Loss	(Thailand) Kaolan Kaovichit	Lumpinee Stadium	Bangkok, Thailand	Decision	5	3:00
1998-09-29	Win	(Thailand) Rambojiew Por Thubtim	Lumpinee Stadium	Bangkok, Thailand	Decision	5	3:00
Defends the Lumpinee Stadium Super Featherweight (130 lbs) title.
1998-05-26	Loss	(Thailand) Attachai Fairtex	Rajadamnern Stadium	Bangkok, Thailand	Decision	5	3:00
1998-02-27	Win	(Thailand) Kaoponglek Luksuratam	Lumpinee Stadium	Bangkok, Thailand	TKO		
1997-12-19	Win	(Thailand) Samkor Kiatmontep	Lumpinee Stadium	Bangkok, Thailand	Decision	5	3:00
Wins the vacant Lumpinee Stadium Super Featherweight (130 lbs) title.
1997-11-	Win	(Thailand) Sakmongkol Mongsaichol	Lumpinee Stadium	Bangkok, Thailand	Decision	5	3:00
1997-09-29	Loss	(Thailand) Rambojiew Por Thubtim	Rajadamnern Stadium	Bangkok, Thailand	Decision	5	3:00
1997-04-	Loss	(Thailand) Namkabuan Nongkeepahuyuth	Lumpinee Stadium	Bangkok, Thailand	Decision	5	3:00
1997-02-15	Win	(Thailand) Samkor Kiatmontep	Lumpinee Stadium	Bangkok, Thailand	Decision	5	3:00
1997-01-	Win	(Thailand) Hansuk Prasathinpanomrung	Lumpinee Stadium	Bangkok, Thailand	Decision	5	3:00
1996-12-27	Win	(Thailand) Keng Singnakhonkui	Lumpinee Stadium	Bangkok, Thailand	KO	4	
1996-11-26	Win	(Thailand) Rittichai Lukjaopodam	Lumpinee Stadium	Bangkok, Thailand	Decision	5	3:00
1996-08-23	Win	(Thailand) Chatchai Paiseetong	Lumpinee Stadium	Bangkok, Thailand	Decision	5	3:00
Defends the Lumpinee Stadium Featherweight (126 lbs) title.
1996-05-21	Win	(Thailand) Mathee Jadeepitak	Lumpinee Stadium	Bangkok, Thailand	Decision	5	3:00
Wins the Lumpinee Stadium Featherweight (126 lbs) title.
1996-04-19	Win	(Thailand) Chatchai Paiseetong	Lumpinee Stadium	Bangkok, Thailand	Decision	5	3:00
1996-03-18	Loss	(Thailand) Kaoponglek Luksuratam	Lumpinee Stadium	Bangkok, Thailand	TKO (Elbow)	4	
1996-02-15	Loss	(Thailand) Chatchai Paiseetong	Lumpinee Stadium	Bangkok, Thailand	KO (Right Hook)	3	
1996-01-26	Win	(Thailand) Prapseuk Sitnarong	Lumpinee Stadium	Bangkok, Thailand	Decision	5	3:00
1995-12-08	Loss	(Thailand) Namkabuan Nongkeepahuyuth	Lumpinee Stadium	Bangkok, Thailand	Decision	5	3:00
1995-10-31	Loss	(Thailand) Namkabuan Nongkeepahuyuth	Lumpinee Stadium	Bangkok, Thailand	Decision	5	3:00
1995-08-22	Win	(Thailand) Mathee Jadeepitak	Lumpinee Stadium	Bangkok, Thailand	KO (Punches)	3	
1995-06-10	Win	(Thailand) Kruekchai Kaewsamrit	Lumpinee Stadium	Bangkok, Thailand	Decision	5	3:00
1995-05-05	Win	(Thailand) Chatchai Paiseetong	Lumpinee Stadium	Bangkok, Thailand	Decision	5	3:00
1995-04-04	Win	(Thailand) Samkor Kiatmontep	Lumpinee Stadium	Bangkok, Thailand	Decision	5	3:00
1995-02-27	Win	(Thailand) Mathee Jadeepitak	Rajadamnern Stadium	Bangkok, Thailand	Decision	5	3:00
1994-11-29	Loss	(Thailand) Saengmorakot Sor.Ploenchit	Lumpinee Stadium	Bangkok, Thailand	KO (Punches)	2	
1994-10-17	Win	(Thailand) Choengnoen Sitphutthapim	Rajadamnern Stadium	Bangkok, Thailand	Decision	5	3:00
1994-09-24	Win	(Thailand) Jaroenwit Kiatbanchong	Lumpinee Stadium	Bangkok, Thailand	KO	3	
1994-08-08	Loss	(Thailand) Boonlai Sor.Thanikul	Rajadamnern Stadium	Bangkok, Thailand	TKO (Punches)	3	
1994-07-19	Win	(Thailand) Samkor Kiatmontep	Lumpinee Stadium	Bangkok, Thailand	Decision	5	3:00
1994-06-10	Win	(Thailand) Namtaothong Sor.Sirikul	Lumpinee Stadium	Bangkok, Thailand	Decision	5	3:00
1994-05-03	Loss	(Thailand) Yokthai Sithoar	Lumpinee Stadium	Bangkok, Thailand	KO (Punches)	2	
1994-03-25	Loss	(Thailand) Boonlai Sor.Thanikul	Lumpinee Stadium	Bangkok, Thailand	KO (Uppercut + Left hook)	2	
1994-02-15	Loss	(Thailand) Chatchai Paiseetong	Lumpinee Stadium	Bangkok, Thailand	KO (Elbow)	3	
1994-01-28	Win	(Thailand) Hansuk Prasathinpanomrung	Lumpinee Stadium	Bangkok, Thailand	Decision	5	3:00
1993-12-07	Loss	(Thailand) Kaensak Sor.Ploenjit	Lumpinee Stadium	Bangkok, Thailand	Decision	5	3:00
1993-10-16	Draw	(Thailand) Kaensak Sor.Ploenjit	Rajadamnern Stadium	Bangkok, Thailand	Decision	5	3:00
1993-08-31	Loss	(Thailand) Karuhat Sor.Supawan	Lumpinee Stadium	Bangkok, Thailand	Decision	5	3:00
1993-07-13	Win	(Thailand) Rittidet Sor.Ploenchit	Lumpinee Stadium	Bangkok, Thailand	Decision	5	3:00
Defends the Lumpinee Stadium Super Flyweight (115 lbs) title.
1993-06-08	Loss	(Thailand) Kaensak Sor.Ploenjit	Lumpinee Stadium	Bangkok, Thailand	Decision	5	3:00
1993-04-30	Win	(Thailand) Jaroensap Kiatbanchong	Lumpinee Stadium	Bangkok, Thailand	Decision (Unanimous)	5	3:00
Wins the Lumpinee Stadium Super Flyweight (115 lbs) title.
1993-01-19	Win	(Thailand) Karuhat Sor.Supawan	Lumpinee Stadium	Bangkok, Thailand	Decision	5	3:00
1992-12-04	Loss	(Thailand) Wangchannoi Sor.Palangchai	Lumpinee Stadium	Bangkok, Thailand	KO (Left hook)	2	
1992-11-06	Draw	(Thailand) Jaroensap Kiatbanchong	Lumpinee Stadium	Bangkok, Thailand	Decision (Split)	5	3:00
For the Lumpinee Stadium Super Flyweight (115 lbs) title.
1992-08-07	Loss	(Thailand) Pompet Naratreekul	Lumpinee Stadium	Bangkok, Thailand	Decision	5	3:00
1992-07-07	Loss	(Thailand) Langsuan Panyuthaphum	Lumpinee Stadium	Bangkok, Thailand	Decision	5	3:00
For the vacant Lumpinee Stadium Super Flyweight (115 lbs) title.
1992-06-09	Win	(Thailand) Langsuan Panyuthaphum	Lumpinee Stadium	Bangkok, Thailand	Decision	5	3:00
1992-04-24	Win	(Thailand) Panphet Muangsurin	Lumpinee Stadium	Bangkok, Thailand	Decision	5	3:00
1992-04-07	Win	(Thailand) Chatchai Paiseetong	Lumpinee Stadium	Bangkok, Thailand	Decision	5	3:00
1992-03-10	Loss	(Thailand) Tukatathong Por.Pongsawang	Lumpinee Stadium	Bangkok, Thailand	Decision	5	3:00
1992-02-22	Win	(Thailand) Pairojnoi Sor.Siamchai	Lumpinee Stadium	Bangkok, Thailand	Decision	5	3:00
1992-01-20	Loss	(Thailand) Thongchai Tor.Silachai	Lumpinee Stadium	Bangkok, Thailand	Decision	5	3:00
1991-11-26	Loss	(Thailand) Moohok Tor.Hintok	Lumpinee Stadium	Bangkok, Thailand	KO	2	
1991-10-25	Win	(Thailand) Toto Por Pongsawang	Lumpinee Stadium	Bangkok, Thailand	Decision	5	3:00
1991-09-17	Win	(Thailand) Sornsuknoi Kiatwichian	Lumpinee Stadium	Bangkok, Thailand	Decision	5	3:00
1991-08-17	Win	(Thailand) Chainoi Sitchunthong	Onesongchai, Lumpinee Stadium	Bangkok, Thailand	Decision	5	3:00
1991-07-30	Win	(Thailand) Rungrit Sor Rachen	Onesongchai, Lumpinee Stadium	Bangkok, Thailand	Decision	5	3:00
1991-	Win	(Thailand) Dechpanom Por Paoin	Lumpinee Stadium	Bangkok, Thailand	Decision	5	3:00
1991-01-20	Loss	(Thailand) Thongchai Tor.Silachai	Kiatphetnoi, Rajadamnern Stadium	Bangkok, Thailand	Decision	5	3:00
1991-	Draw	(Thailand) Pompetch Naratreekul	Lumpinee Stadium	Bangkok, Thailand	Decision	5	3:00
1990-12-11	Win	(Thailand) Dechpanom Por.Paoin	Chaomangkon + Onesongchai, Lumpinee Stadium	Bangkok, Thailand	Decision	5	3:00
1990-	Win	(Thailand) Pompet Kiatchtpayak	Lumpinee Stadium	Bangkok, Thailand	Decision	5	3:00
1990-06-30	Loss	(Thailand) Petchsamut Sor.Rungnakhon	Onesongchai, Lumpinee Stadium	Bangkok, Thailand	Decision	5	3:00
1990-04-14	Win	(Thailand) Harnchai Kiatrattaphon	Lumpinee Stadium	Bangkok, Thailand	Decision	5	3:00
1990-	Win	(Thailand) Kaychonnoi Sor Sukanya	Lumpinee Stadium	Bangkok, Thailand	Decision	5	3:00
Legend: Win Loss Draw/No contest Notes
