= Detduang Por.Pongsawang =

Thai former professional Muay Thai fighter and boxer

- Born: Sathien Moonkaset c. 1963; Selaphum, Roi Et, Thailand
- Native name: เสถียร มูลเกษร
- Other names: Detduang Juangprimo (เด็ดดวง จ้วง พรีโม่); Detduang Nor.Nattawut (เด็ดดวง น.นัฐวุฒิ); Dedduang
- Nickname: The Perilous Bonsai (บอนไซมหาภัย)
- Division: Light Flyweight; Flyweight; Super Flyweight; Bantamweight
- Style: Muay Thai (Muay Mat)
- Stance: Southpaw
- Team: Por.Pongsawang

Other information
- Occupation: Muay Thai trainer
- Notable relatives: Tukatathong Por.Pongsawang (younger brother); Dokmaipa Por.Pongsawang (younger brother)
- Boxing record from BoxRec

Sathien Moonkaset (Thai: เสถียร มูลเกษร), known professionally as Detduang Por.Pongsawang (Thai: เด็ดดวง ป.พงษ์สว่าง), is a Thai former professional Muay Thai fighter and boxer. He was a two-time Lumpinee Stadium and two-time Rajadamnern Stadium title challenger who was famous during the 1980s and 1990s. He is the elder brother of Dokmaipa Por.Pongsawang and Tukatathong Por.Pongsawang who were also famous Muay Thai fighters.

== Biography and career ==
Detduang trained for most of his career at the Por.Pongsawang gym in Bangkok alongside his brothers, Dokmaipa Por.Pongsawang and Tukatathong Por.Pongsawang, as well as Toto Por Pongsawang and Duangsompong Por.Pongsawang under the management of "Sergeant Tu" Songphon Pongsawang. Nicknamed "Bonsai Mahapai" (The Perilous Bonsai) for his small stature but strong and muscular build, Detduang was one of the highest paid fighters of his time on the Bangkok circuit.

Detduang was renowned from 1987 to 1994 during the Golden Era of Muay Thai and faced many notable fighters such as Karuhat Sor.Supawan, Samson Isaan, Samransak Muangsurin, Wangchannoi Sor.Palangchai, Langsuan Panyuthaphum, Orachunnoi Hor.Mahachai, Paruhatlek Sitchunthong, Namkabuan Nongkeepahuyuth, Chatchai Paiseetong, Jaroensap Kiatbanchong, Mathee Jadeepitak, Chandet Sor.Prantalay, and Dennuea Denmolee.

Detduang retired from Muay Thai to transition to boxing in 1994. He had six fights, winning five and losing one. He definitely retired from competition in 1996 and became a bodyguard in Macau. He is currently a trainer at the P.K.SaenchaiMuayThai gym.

== Titles and honours ==
- Lumpinee Stadium
  - 1993 Lumpinee Stadium Fight of the Year (vs. Saenmuangnoi Lukjaopormehasak)

== Fight record ==
Muay Thai Record
Date	Result	Opponent	Event	Location	Method	Round	Time
1994-01-06	Loss	(Thailand) Chartchainoi Chaorai-Oi	Aswindam, Rajadamnern Stadium	Bangkok, Thailand	Decision	5	3:00
1993-12-10	Loss	(Thailand) Saenmuangnoi Lukjaopormehasa	Petchyindee, Lumpinee Stadium	Bangkok, Thailand	Decision	5	3:00
1993-11-	Win	(Laos) Thaowerasak Pithaikam		Thailand	Decision	5	3:00
1993-11-05	Win	(Thailand) Siptit Lukbanyai	Kiatpetch, Lumpinee Stadium	Bangkok, Thailand	Decision	5	3:00
1993-09-03	Win	(Thailand) Sakpanya Kiatbunkerd	Lumpinee Stadium	Bangkok, Thailand	Decision	5	3:00
1993-04-09	Win	(Thailand) Yodawuth Sitmaek	Lumpinee Stadium	Bangkok, Thailand	Decision	5	3:00
1993-01-29	Loss	(Thailand) Chatchai Paiseetong	Fairtex, Lumpinee Stadium	Bangkok, Thailand	Decision	5	3:00
1992-12-29	Loss	(Thailand) Chatchai Paiseetong	Lumpinee Stadium	Bangkok, Thailand	Decision	5	3:00
1992-05-30	Loss	(Thailand) Singhao Tor.Hintok	Lumpinee Stadium	Bangkok, Thailand	Decision	5	3:00
1992-04-03	Loss	(Thailand) D-Day Kiatmuangnkan	Lumpinee Stadium	Bangkok, Thailand	Decision	5	3:00
1992-	Loss	(Thailand) Jaroensap Kiatbanchong	Lumpinee Stadium	Bangkok, Thailand	Decision	5	3:00
1991-10-18	Loss	(Thailand) Panphet Muangsurin	Onesongchai, Lumpinee Stadium	Bangkok, Thailand	Decision	5	3:00
1991-08-10	Loss	(Thailand) Chandet Sor.Prantalay	Lumpinee Stadium	Bangkok, Thailand	Decision	5	3:00
1991-05-10	Loss	(Thailand) Mathee Jadeepitak	Lumpinee Stadium	Bangkok, Thailand	Decision	5	3:00
1991-01-04	Loss	(Thailand) Karuhat Sor.Supawan	Lumpinee Stadium	Bangkok, Thailand	TKO (doctor stoppage)	2	
1990-12-11	Loss	(Thailand) Jaroensap Kiatbanchong	Lumpinee Stadium	Bangkok, Thailand	KO	3	
1990-11-20	Loss	(Thailand) Oley Kiatoneway	Lumpinee Stadium	Bangkok, Thailand	Decision	5	3:00
1990-10-12	Loss	(Thailand) Samranthong Chuchokechai	Lumpinee Stadium	Bangkok, Thailand	Decision	5	3:00
1990-09-11	Win	(Thailand) Panphet Muangsurin	Lumpinee Stadium	Bangkok, Thailand	KO	4	
1990-08-21	Draw	(Thailand) Panphet Muangsurin	Lumpinee Stadium	Bangkok, Thailand	Decision	5	3:00
1990-07-10	Loss	(Thailand) Namkabuan Nongkeepahuyuth	Lumpinee Stadium	Bangkok, Thailand	Decision	5	3:00
1990-03-30	Loss	(Thailand) Wangchannoi Sor.Palangchai	Onesongchai, Lumpinee Stadium	Bangkok, Thailand	Decision	5	3:00
1990-03-02	Draw	(Thailand) Noppadet Sor.Rewadee	Lumpinee Stadium	Bangkok, Thailand	Decision	5	3:00
1990-02-17	Win	(Thailand) Kaonar Sor.Kettalinchan		Bangkok, Thailand	Decision	5	3:00
1990-02-06	Win	(Thailand) Thanooin Chor.Chuchart		Bangkok, Thailand	KO	1	
1990-01-13	Loss	(Thailand) Thanooin Chor.Chuchart		Bangkok, Thailand	Decision	5	3:00
1989-12-26	Win	(Thailand) Saichon Phichitsuk	Lumpinee Stadium	Bangkok, Thailand	KO	3	
1989-10-17	Loss	(Thailand) Kangwannoi Or.Sribualoi	Petchyindee, Lumpinee Stadium	Bangkok, Thailand	Decision	5	3:00
1989-09-29	Win	(Thailand) Kongkai Muangchaiyaphum		Bangkok, Thailand	KO	3	
1989-09-05	Win	(Thailand) Saichon Phichitsuk	Lumpinee Stadium	Bangkok, Thailand	Decision	5	3:00
1989-08-08	Loss	(Thailand) Langsuan Panyuthaphum	Lumpinee Stadium	Bangkok, Thailand	Decision	5	3:00
1989-06-30	Win	(Thailand) Saichon Pichitsuk	Petchyindee, Lumpinee Stadium	Bangkok, Thailand	Decision	5	3:00
1989-05-02	Loss	(Thailand) Noppadet Sor.Rewadee	Lumpinee Stadium	Bangkok, Thailand	KO	3	
1989-03-10	Win	(Thailand) Samransak Muangsurin	Onesongchai, Lumpinee Stadium	Bangkok, Thailand	Decision	5	3:00
1989-01-24	Win	(Thailand) Waifai PrabhasMotor		Bangkok, Thailand	Decision	5	3:00
1989-01-05	Win	(Thailand) Phodam Chuwattana	Daorung Chujaroen, Rajadamnern Stadium	Bangkok, Thailand	Decision	5	3:00
1988-12-08	Win	(Thailand) Odnoi Lukprabat	Daorung Chujaroen, Rajadamnern Stadium	Bangkok, Thailand	Decision	5	3:00
1988-10-13	Win	(Thailand) Daoden Sor.Sakkasem		Bangkok, Thailand	KO	2	
1988-09-12	Loss	(Thailand) Dennuea Denmolee		Bangkok, Thailand	Decision	5	3:00
1988-08-10	Loss	(Thailand) Klaisuwit Sunkilanongkhee	Phettongkam, Rajadamnern Stadium	Bangkok, Thailand	Decision	5	3:00
1988-07-18	Win	(Thailand) Odnoi Lukprabat	Yod Nuea Thong, Rajadamnern Stadium	Bangkok, Thailand	Decision	5	3:00
1988-06-15	Win	(Thailand) Sangyuth Thianhiran	Rajadamnern Stadium	Bangkok, Thailand	Decision	5	3:00
1988-05-03	Loss	(Thailand) Paruhatlek Sitchunthong	Onesongchai, Lumpinee Stadium	Bangkok, Thailand	Decision	5	3:00
For the vacant Lumpinee Stadium Flyweight (112 lbs) title.
1988-03-17	Win	(Thailand) Daoden Sor.Sakkasem		Bangkok, Thailand	KO	3	
1988-02-25	Win	(Thailand) Baeber Lukjaomaechamadevi	Daorung Chujaroen, Rajadamnern Stadium	Bangkok, Thailand	Decision	5	3:00
1987-11-11	Win	(Thailand) Jomhod Luksamrong		Bangkok, Thailand	Decision	5	3:00
1987-09-24	NC	(Thailand) Muangchonnoi Lukphrabat		Bangkok, Thailand	Ref.stop (dismissed)	3	
1987-08-14	Loss	(Thailand) Kongfa Lukthapfa	Chatuchok, Lumpinee Stadium	Bangkok, Thailand	KO	2	
1987-07-07	Win	(Thailand) Kongfa Lukthapfa	Chatuchok, Lumpinee Stadium	Bangkok, Thailand	Decision	5	3:00
1987-05-06	Win	(Thailand) Paiboon Fairtex	Chalermchai, Rajadamnern Stadium	Bangkok, Thailand	Decision	5	3:00
1987-03-26	Win	(Thailand) Kopho Sit Chanyut		Bangkok, Thailand	KO	1	
1987-03-06	Win	(Thailand) Songwannoi Sor.Rungroj		Bangkok, Thailand	Decision	5	3:00
1987-01-06	Win	(Thailand) Songwannoi Sor.Rungroj		Bangkok, Thailand	Decision	5	3:00
1986-12-05	Win	(Thailand) Kongsak Sit Samthahan		Bangkok, Thailand	KO	1	
1986-10-25	Loss	(Thailand) Kopho Sit Chanyut		Bangkok, Thailand	KO	4	
1986-08-29	NC	(Thailand) Jockeynoi Na Buriram		Bangkok, Thailand	Ref.stop (Jockeynoi dismissed)	4	
1986-08-01	Loss	(Thailand) Sukkasemnoi Fairtex	Lumpinee Stadium	Bangkok, Thailand	Decision	5	3:00
1986-07-01	Loss	(Thailand) Waifai PrabhasMotor	Lumpinee Stadium	Bangkok, Thailand	Decision	5	3:00
1986-06-03	Loss	(Thailand) Dennuea Denmolee	Lumpinee Stadium	Bangkok, Thailand	Decision	5	3:00
1986-03-28	Loss	(Thailand) Paruhatlek Sitchunthong	Lumpinee Stadium	Bangkok, Thailand	Decision	5	3:00
1986-03-04	Loss	(Thailand) Payanoi Sor.Tasanee	Lumpinee Stadium	Bangkok, Thailand	Decision	5	3:00
1986-01-31	Loss	(Thailand) Boonam Sor.Jarunee	Lumpinee Stadium	Bangkok, Thailand	Decision	5	3:00
1986-01-04	Loss	(Thailand) Klaipatti Majestic		Bangkok, Thailand	Decision	5	3:00
1985-11-29	Win	(Thailand) Paiboon Fairtex	Lumpinee Stadium	Bangkok, Thailand	Decision	5	3:00
1985-11-05	Win	(Thailand) Odnoi Lukprabat		Bangkok, Thailand	KO	2	
1985-09-16	Loss	(Thailand) Sangyuth Thianhiran	Rajadamnern Stadium	Bangkok, Thailand	KO	2	
For the vacant Rajadamnern Stadium Flyweight (112 lbs) title.
1985-07-17	NC	(Thailand) Songwannoi Sitsaphan		Bangkok, Thailand	Ref.stop (Songwannoi dismissed)	4	
1985-06-24	Loss	(Thailand) Boonam Sor.Jarunee	Rajadamnern Stadium	Bangkok, Thailand	Decision	5	3:00
For the Rajadamnern Stadium Flyweight (112 lbs) title.
1985-05-21	Win	(Thailand) Payanoi Sor.Thanikul	Lumpinee Stadium	Bangkok, Thailand	Decision	5	3:00
1985-03-26	Win	(Thailand) Noeun Sor.Ploenchit		Bangkok, Thailand	Decision	5	3:00
1985-02-22	Win	(Thailand) Thongsak Fairtex		Bangkok, Thailand	Decision	5	3:00
1985-01-11	Draw	(Thailand) Paruhatlek Sitchunthong	Kiatsompop, Lumpinee Stadium	Bangkok, Thailand	Decision	5	3:00
For the Lumpinee Stadium Light Flyweight (108 lbs) title.
1984-	Win	(Thailand) Lukchaomae Chamadevi		Bangkok, Thailand	Decision	5	3:00
1983-10-22	Win	(Thailand) Orachunnoi Hor.Mahachai		Nong Khai province, Thailand	KO	2	
1983-09-20	Win	(Thailand) Narinnoi Lukprabat		Nong Khai province, Thailand	Decision	5	3:00
