= Tukatathong Por.Pongsawang =

Thai former professional Muay Thai fighter

- Born: Boonreung Moonkasorn; June 11, 1971 (age 55); Selaphum, Roi Et, Thailand
- Native name: บุญเรือง มูลเกษร
- Nickname: The Youngest Bonsai (บอนไซสุดท้อง)
- Height: 1.65 m (5 ft 5 in)
- Division: Light Flyweight; Flyweight; Super Flyweight
- Style: Muay Thai (Muay Femur)
- Stance: Orthodox
- Team: Por.Pongsawang

Other information
- Notable relatives: Dokmaipa Por.Pongsawang (Older brother); Detduang Por.Pongsawang (Older brother)

Boonreung Moonkasorn, (Thai: บุญเรือง มูลเกษร; born June 11, 1971), known professionally as Tukkatatong Por.Pongsawang (Thai: ตุ๊กตาทอง ป.พงษ์สว่าง), is a Thai former professional Muay Thai fighter. He is a former Lumpinee Stadium Light Flyweight Champion who was active during the 1980s and 1990s. He is the younger brother of Dokmaipa Por.Pongsawang and Detduang Por.Pongsawang who were also famous Muay Thai fighters.

== Biography and career ==
He trained at the Por.Pongsawang gym alongside his brothers, Dokmaipa Por Pongsawang and Detduang Por.Pongsawang, as well as Toto Por Pongsawang and Duangsompong Por.Pongsawang.

He fought during the Golden Era of Muay Thai against many notable fighters including Karuhat Sor.Supawan, Lamnamoon Sor.Sumalee, Hippy Singmanee, Langsuan Panyuthaphum, Saenklai SitKruOd, Silapathai Jockygym, Thongchai Tor.Silachai, Nungubon Sitlerchai, Jaroensap Kiatbanchong, Burklerk Pinsinchai, Chandet Sor.Prantalay, Orono Por.MuangUbon, Lakhin Wassandasit, Pairojnoi Sor.Siamchai, and Chainoi Muangsurin.

== Titles and honours ==
- Lumpinee Stadium
  - 1990 Lumpinee Stadium Light Flyweight (108 lbs) Champion

== Fight record ==
Muay Thai Record (Incomplete)
| Date | Result | Opponent | Event | Location | Method | Round | Time |
|---|---|---|---|---|---|---|---|
| 1996-08-24 | Win | (Thailand) Pairojnoi Sor Siamchai | Lumpinee Stadium | Bangkok, Thailand | Decision | 5 | 3:00 |
| 1996-03- | Loss | (Thailand) Sod Looknongyangtoy | Lumpinee Stadium | Bangkok, Thailand | KO | 2 | |
| 1996-02-13 | Loss | (Thailand) Thongchai Tor.Silachai | Onesongchai, Lumpinee Stadium | Bangkok, Thailand | KO (Uppercut) | 4 | |
| 1996-01-09 | Loss | (Thailand) Ritthichai Lukjaopordam | Lumpinee Stadium | Bangkok, Thailand | Decision | 5 | 3:00 |
| 1995-11-28 | Loss | (Thailand) Petchsinil Sor.Ubonrat | Lumpinee Stadium | Bangkok, Thailand | KO (Punch) | 1 | |
| 1995-10-17 | Loss | (Thailand) Thongchai Tor.Silachai | Onesongchai, Lumpinee Stadium | Bangkok, Thailand | Decision | 5 | 3:00 |
| 1995-09-26 | Win | (Thailand) Thawatchai Sor.Siamchai | Lumpinee Stadium | Bangkok, Thailand | Decision | 5 | 3:00 |
| 1995-08-04 | Loss | (Thailand) Chaiyai Sittheppitak | Onesongchai, Lumpinee Stadium | Bangkok, Thailand | KO (High kick) | 5 | |
| 1995-06-09 | Win | (Thailand) Rattanachai Wor.Walaphon | Lumpinee Stadium | Bangkok, Thailand | Decision | 5 | 3:00 |
| 1995-05-05 | Win | (Thailand) Singhao Tor.Hintok | Lumpinee Stadium | Bangkok, Thailand | Decision | 5 | 3:00 |
| 1995-04-04 | Win | (Thailand) Chailek SitKaruhat | Onesongchai, Lumpinee Stadium | Bangkok, Thailand | Decision | 5 | 3:00 |
| 1995-02-28 | Loss | (Thailand) Yodsiam Sor.Prantalay | Onesongchai, Lumpinee Stadium | Bangkok, Thailand | TKO (Doctor stoppage) | 3 | |
| 1994-12-16 | Loss | (Thailand) Petchnamnueng Por.Chatchai | Lumpinee Stadium | Bangkok, Thailand | Decision | 5 | 3:00 |
| 1994-08-30 | Loss | (Thailand) Jomhodlek Rattanachot | Lumpinee Stadium | Bangkok, Thailand | Decision | 5 | 3:00 |
| 1994-08-05 | Loss | (Thailand) Jomhodlek Rattanachot | Lumpinee Stadium | Bangkok, Thailand | Decision | 5 | 3:00 |
| 1994-07-05 | Loss | (Thailand) Saenklai Sit Kru Od | Petchyindee, Lumpinee Stadium | Bangkok, Thailand | Decision | 5 | 3:00 |
| 1994- | Win | (Thailand) Kasemlek Kiatsiri | | Bangkok, Thailand | Decision | 5 | 3:00 |
| 1994-03-15 | Win | (Thailand) Jomhodlek Rattanachot | Lumpinee Stadium | Bangkok, Thailand | Decision | 5 | 3:00 |
| 1993-10-15 | Loss | (Thailand) Jomhodlek Rattanachot | Lumpinee Stadium | Bangkok, Thailand | KO | 4 | |
| 1993-07-12 | Loss | (Thailand) Langsuan Panyuthaphum | Aswindam, Rajadamnern Stadium | Bangkok, Thailand | Decision | 5 | 3:00 |
| 1993-05-17 | Loss | (Thailand) Burklerk Pinsinchai | Aswindam, Rajadamnern Stadium | Bangkok, Thailand | KO (Right cross) | 4 | |
| 1993-04-09 | Win | (Thailand) Jaroensak Kiatnakornchon | Lumpinee Stadium | Bangkok, Thailand | Decision | 5 | 3:00 |
| 1993-01-13 | Loss | (Thailand) Silapathai Jockygym | Rajadamnern Stadium | Bangkok, Thailand | Decision | 5 | 3:00 |
| 1992-12-05 | Loss | (Thailand) Lakhin Wassandasit | Lumpinee Stadium | Bangkok, Thailand | Decision | 5 | 3:00 |
| 1992-11-20 | Win | (Thailand) Kongklai Sit Kru Od | Onesongchai, Lumpinee Stadium | Bangkok, Thailand | Decision | 5 | 3:00 |
| 1992- | Win | (Thailand) Chainoi Muangsurin | Lumpinee Stadium | Bangkok, Thailand | KO | 3 | |
| 1992-07-21 | Win | (Thailand) Singhao Tor.Hintok | Lumpinee Stadium | Bangkok, Thailand | Decision | 5 | 3:00 |
| 1992- | Win | (Thailand) Panphet Muangsurin | Lumpinee Stadium | Bangkok, Thailand | Decision | 5 | 3:00 |
| 1992- | Win | (Thailand) Thongchai Tor.Silachai | Lumpinee Stadium | Bangkok, Thailand | Decision | 5 | 3:00 |
| 1992-04-07 | Win | (Thailand) Michael Sor.Sukonthip | Onesongchai, Lumpinee Stadium | Bangkok, Thailand | Decision | 5 | 3:00 |
| 1992-03-10 | Win | (Thailand) Lamnamoon Sor.Sumalee | Lumpinee Stadium | Bangkok, Thailand | Decision | 5 | 3:00 |
| 1992-02-21 | Win | (Thailand) Pomphet Kiatchatpayak | Onesongchai, Lumpinee Stadium | Bangkok, Thailand | KO | 3 | |
| 1992-01-21 | Win | (Thailand) Jaroensap Kiatbanchong | Lumpinee Stadium | Bangkok, Thailand | Decision | 5 | 3:00 |
| 1991-12-24 | Win | (Thailand) Thongchai Tor.Silachai | Lumpinee Stadium | Bangkok, Thailand | Decision | 5 | 3:00 |
| 1991-09-17 | Loss | (Thailand) Karuhat Sor.Supawan | Lumpinee Stadium | Bangkok, Thailand | Decision | 5 | 3:00 |
| 1991-08-14 | Win | (Thailand) Jaroensap Kiatbanchong | Lumpinee Stadium | Bangkok, Thailand | Decision | 5 | 3:00 |
| 1991-05-10 | Loss | (Thailand) Pongsiri Por.Ruamrudee | Lumpinee Stadium | Bangkok, Thailand | Decision | 5 | 3:00 |
| 1991-03-05 | | (Thailand) Chainoi Muangsurin | Onesongchai, Lumpinee Stadium | Bangkok, Thailand | Decision | 5 | 3:00 |
| 1991-01-26 | Loss | (Thailand) Langsuan Panyuthaphum | Onesongchai, Lumpinee Stadium | Bangkok, Thailand | Decision | 5 | 3:00 |
| 1990-12-07 | Win | (Thailand) Chandet Sor.Prantalay | Lumpinee Stadium | Bangkok, Thailand | Decision | 5 | 3:00 |
| 1990-10-30 | Win | (Thailand) Pongsiri Por.Ruamrudee | Lumpinee Stadium | Bangkok, Thailand | Decision | 5 | 3:00 |
| 1990-08-31 | Loss | (Thailand) Kruekchai Kaewsamrit | Lumpinee Stadium | Bangkok, Thailand | TKO (Doctor stoppage) | | |
Loses the Lumpinee Stadium Light Flyweight (108 lbs) title.
| 1990-06-29 | Win | (Thailand) Pairojnoi Sor Siamchai | Lumpinee Stadium | Bangkok, Thailand | Decision | 5 | 3:00 |
| 1990-05-01 | Win | (Thailand) Pairojnoi Sor Siamchai | Lumpinee Stadium | Bangkok, Thailand | Decision | 5 | 3:00 |
| 1990-03-30 | Win | (Thailand) Hippy Singmanee | Lumpinee Stadium | Bangkok, Thailand | Decision | 5 | 3:00 |
Wins the Lumpinee Stadium Light Flyweight (108 lbs) title.
| 1990-01-25 | Loss | (Thailand) Jaroensap Kiatbanchong | Lumpinee Stadium | Bangkok, Thailand | Decision | 5 | 3:00 |
| 1989-06-06 | Loss | (Thailand) Rainbow Sor.Prantalay | Pongsawang, Lumpinee Stadium | Bangkok, Thailand | KO | 1 | |
| 1989-05-12 | Win | (Thailand) Nungubon Sitlerchai | Lumpinee Stadium | Bangkok, Thailand | Decision | 5 | 3:00 |
| 1989-04-08 | Win | (Thailand) Pornprasit Sit Sianchua | Lumpinee Stadium | Bangkok, Thailand | Decision | 5 | 3:00 |
| 1989-03-04 | Loss | (Thailand) Orono Por.MuangUbon | Lumpinee Stadium | Bangkok, Thailand | Decision | 5 | 3:00 |
| 1989-02-07 | Loss | (Thailand) Samorngen Sakpradu | Fairtex, Lumpinee Stadium | Bangkok, Thailand | Decision | 5 | 3:00 |
| 1988-12-02 | Loss | (Thailand) Saengdao Kiatanan | Onesongchai, Lumpinee Stadium | Bangkok, Thailand | KO | 3 | |
| 1988-10-28 | Loss | (Thailand) Rungruang Kiatnan | Onesongchai + Fairtex, Lumpinee Stadium | Bangkok, Thailand | KO | 4 | |
| 1988-06-07 | Win | (Thailand) Takrawlek Dejrath | Lumpinee Stadium | Bangkok, Thailand | Decision | 5 | 3:00 |
Legend: Win Loss Draw/No contest Notes
