= Kompayak Singmanee =

Thai former professional Muay Thai fighter

- Born: Arkom Chuthong; March 4, 1969 (age 57); Thung Song, Nakhon Si Thammarat, Thailand
- Native name: อาคม ชูทอง
- Height: 164 cm (5 ft 5 in)
- Division: Mini Flyweight; Light Flyweight
- Style: Muay Thai (Muay Femur)
- Stance: Orthodox
- Team: Singmanee Gym
- Trainer: Kru Cherd Chuthong (father)

Other information
- Notable relatives: Hippy Singmanee (older brother); Thungsong Singmanee (older brother)

Arkom Chuthong (Thai: อาคม ชูทอง); known professionally as Kompayak Singmanee (Thai: คมพยัคฆ์ สิงห์มณี), is a Thai former professional Muay Thai fighter. He is a former three-time Lumpinee Stadium Mini Flyweight Champion who fought during the 80s and 90s.

== Biography and career ==
Arkhom Chuthong was born on March 4, 1969, in Thung Song, Nakhon Si Thammarat. He is the 7th child out of 8 siblings and started Muay Thai under his father who taught his sons for all their careers. As Kompayak began to show progress, he was brought to different local competitions where he mostly won by decision. Kompayak trained at Singmanee Gym alongside his brothers under his father as well as Sommai Chuthong and Sutham Timjitwittaya. His older brother, Muay Thai legend, Hippy Singmanee became a multiple time Lumpinee Stadium champion.

During the early 1990s Kompayak was one of the most dominant fighter in the lightest divisions of the Bangkok circuit and became a three times Lumpinee Stadium Mini Flyweight champion. Fighting in priority for legendary promotor Songchai Rattanasuban Kompayak faced many notable champions such as Pairojnoi Sor.Siamchai, Rotnarong Daopadriew, Pichitnoi Sitbangprachan and Panphet Muangsurin who he defeated for the Shark Atack Muay Thai championship.

After retiring Kompayak stayed involved in the Muay Thai world as a promoter in his native province alongside his brother Hippy.

Kompayak came out of retirement for a fight on September 9, 2017, where he faced Nong Rose Banjaroensuk for a one million baht side bet. He lost by knockout in the third round.

== Titles & honours ==
- Lumpinee Stadium
  - 1990 Lumpinee Stadium Mini Flyweight (105 lbs) Champion
  - 1991 Lumpinee Stadium Mini Flyweight (105 lbs) Champion
    - One successful title defense
  - 1992 Lumpinee Stadium Mini Flyweight (105 lbs) Champion
    - Three successful title defenses
  - 1994 Shark Attack Muay Thai Championship

== Fight record ==
Muay Thai Record
Date	Result	Opponent	Event	Location	Method	Round	Time
2017-09-06	Loss	(Thailand) Nong Rose Banjaroensuk	Onesongchai, Rajadamnern Stadium	Bangkok, Thailand	KO (Knees)	3	
1995-12-11	Loss	(Thailand) Attachai Por.Samranchai	Rajadamnern Stadium	Bangkok, Thailand	Decision	5	3:00
1995-	Loss	(Thailand) Attachai Por.Yosanan	Rajadamnern Stadium	Bangkok, Thailand	Decision	5	3:00
1995-09-12	Loss	(Thailand) Saenkam Sakphanu	Lumpinee Stadium	Bangkok, Thailand	Decision	5	3:00
1995-08-12	Win	(Thailand) Sakpaitoon Decharat	Onesongchai, Lumpinee Stadium	Bangkok, Thailand	Decision	5	3:00
1995-06-27	Loss	(Thailand) Sakpaitoon Decharat	Onesongchai, Lumpinee Stadium	Bangkok, Thailand	KO (Low kicks)	3	
1995-06-09	Win	(Thailand) Chaichana Dechtawee	Lumpinee Stadium	Bangkok, Thailand	Decision	5	3:00
1995-02-28	Loss	(Thailand) Saenkam Sakphanu	Onesongchai, Lumpinee Stadium	Bangkok, Thailand	Decision	5	3:00
1995-01-03	Loss	(Thailand) Sod Looknongyangtoy	Rajadamnern Stadium	Bangkok, Thailand	Decision	5	3:00
1994-03-22	Win	(Thailand) Chainoi Muangsurin	Lumpinee Stadium	Bangkok, Thailand	Decision	5	3:00
1994-02-12	Win	(Thailand) Panphet Muangsurin	Lumpinee Stadium	Bangkok, Thailand	Decision	5	3:00
Wins the Shark Attack Muay Thai Championship.
1994-01-08	NC	(Thailand) Panphet Muangsurin	Lumpinee Stadium	Bangkok, Thailand	overturned decision	5	3:00
For the Shark Attack Muay Thai Championship. Originally a decision win for Kompayak, overturned after protest.
1993-12-11	Win	(Thailand) Phutphadlek Sor.Chalermchai	Lumpinee Stadium	Bangkok, Thailand	Decision	5	3:00
1993-10-29	Loss	(Thailand) Duangsompong Por.Pongsawang	Rajadamnern Stadium	Bangkok, Thailand	Decision	5	3:00
1993-08-31	Win	(Thailand) Singsamphan Kiatsingnoi	Rajadamnern Stadium	Bangkok, Thailand	Decision	5	3:00
1993-07-	Win	(Thailand) Phutphadlek Sor.Chalermchai	Lumpinee Stadium	Bangkok, Thailand	Decision	5	3:00
1993-07-	Win	(Thailand) Saenkeng Sor.Weerakul	Lumpinee Stadium	Bangkok, Thailand	Decision	5	3:00
1993-	Win	(Thailand) Chailek Sitkaruhat	Lumpinee Stadium	Bangkok, Thailand	KO	4	
1993-	Win	(Thailand) Satchanoi Sor.Pinya	Lumpinee Stadium	Bangkok, Thailand	Decision	5	3:00
1993-	Win	(Thailand) Chainoi Sitchunthong	Lumpinee Stadium	Bangkok, Thailand	Decision	5	3:00
1993-05-07	Loss	(Thailand) Pichitnoi Sitbangprachan	Onesongchai, Lumpinee Stadium	Bangkok, Thailand	Decision	5	3:00
1993-03-05	Win	(Thailand) Singsamphan Kiatsingnoi	Onesongchai, Lumpinee Stadium	Bangkok, Thailand	Decision	5	3:00
Defends the Lumpinee Stadium Mini Flyweight (105 lbs) title.
1993-02-09	Win	(Thailand) Samkor Chor.Rathchatasupak	Lumpinee Stadium	Bangkok, Thailand	Decision	5	3:00
1993-01-19	Win	(Thailand) Pichitnoi Sitbangprachan	Lumpinee Stadium	Bangkok, Thailand	Decision (Unanimous)	5	3:00
Defends the Lumpinee Stadium Mini Flyweight (105 lbs) title.
1992-11-20	Win	(Thailand) Samkor Chor.Rathchatasupak	Onesongchai, Lumpinee Stadium	Bangkok, Thailand	Decision	5	3:00
1992-10-31	Win	(Thailand) Yokthai Sit Or	Onesongchai, Lumpinee Stadium	Bangkok, Thailand	Decision	5	3:00
Defends the Lumpinee Stadium Mini Flyweight (105 lbs) title.
1992-05-29	Loss	(Thailand) Daoswing Kiattiratphon	Onesongchai, Lumpinee Stadium	Bangkok, Thailand	Decision	5	3:00
1992-04-27	Win	(Thailand) Singsampan Kiatsingnoi	Kiatsingnoi, Rajadamnern Stadium	Bangkok, Thailand	Decision	5	3:00
1992-03-27	Loss	(Thailand) Rotnarong Daopadriew	Lumpinee Stadium	Bangkok, Thailand	Decision	5	3:00
1991-10-12	Loss	(Thailand) Rattanachai Wor.Walapol	Lumpinee Stadium	Bangkok, Thailand	Decision	5	3:00
Loses the Lumpinee Stadium Mini Flyweight (105 lbs) title.
1991-09-03	Win	(Thailand) Chingchai Sakdaroon	Lumpinee Stadium	Bangkok, Thailand	Decision	5	3:00
Defends the Lumpinee Stadium Mini Flyweight (105 lbs) title.
1991-08-06	Win	(Thailand) Morakot Sor.Thamarangsri	Onesongchai, Lumpinee Stadium	Bangkok, Thailand	Decision	5	3:00
1991-07-02	Win	(Thailand) Khanunphet JohnnyGym	Lumpinee Stadium	Bangkok, Thailand	Decision	5	3:00
Wins the vacant Lumpinee Stadium Mini Flyweight (105 lbs) title.
1991-05-10	Win	(Thailand) Khanunphet JohnnyGym		Nakhon Si Thammarat, Thailand	Decision	5	3:00
1991-03-01	Loss	(Thailand) Thongchai Tor.Silachai	Onesongchai, Lumpinee Stadium	Bangkok, Thailand	Decision	5	3:00
1991-01-26	Win	(Thailand) Singhao Tor.Hintok	Lumpinee Stadium	Bangkok, Thailand	Decision	5	3:00
1990-12-	Win	(Thailand) Toto Por.Pongsawang	Lumpinee Stadium	Bangkok, Thailand	Decision	5	3:00
1990-10-29	Loss	(Thailand) Duangsompong Por.Pongsawang	Rajadamnern Stadium	Bangkok, Thailand	Decision	5	3:00
1990-09-25	Loss	(Thailand) Orono Por.MuangUbon	Onesongchai, Lumpinee Stadium	Bangkok, Thailand	Decision	5	3:00
1990-08-21	Win	(Thailand) Chandet Sor.Prantalay	Onesongchai, Lumpinee Stadium	Bangkok, Thailand	Decision	5	3:00
1990-08-03	Win	(Thailand) Pairojnoi Sor.Siamchai	Lumpinee Stadium	Bangkok, Thailand	Decision	5	3:00
1990-06-25	Win	(Thailand) Nungubon Sitlerchai	Kiatsingnoi, Rajadamnern Stadium	Bangkok, Thailand	Decision	5	3:00
1990-05-21	Win	(Thailand) Jaroensap Kiatbanchong	Rajadamnern Stadium	Bangkok, Thailand	Decision	5	3:00
1990-04-30	Win	(Thailand) Sornsuknoi Sakwichian	Kiatsingoi, Rajadamnern Stadium	Bangkok, Thailand	Decision	5	3:00
1990-03-30	Loss	(Thailand) Nungubon Sitlerchai	Onesongchai, Lumpinee Stadium	Bangkok, Thailand	Decision	5	3:00
Loses the Lumpinee Stadium Mini Flyweight (105 lbs) title.
1990-02-23	Win	(Thailand) Samad Kiatthaweesuk	Lumpinee Stadium	Bangkok, Thailand	Decision	5	3:00
1990-02-06	Win	(Thailand) Saengdao Kiatanan	Onesongchai, Lumpinee Stadium	Bangkok, Thailand	KO (Knee)	4	
Wins the Lumpinee Stadium Mini Flyweight (105 lbs) title.
1990-01-	Draw	(Thailand) Saengdao Kiatanan	Lumpinee Stadium	Bangkok, Thailand	Decision	5	3:00
1989-	Win	(Thailand) Singthongnoi Sor.Siamchai	Lumpinee Stadium	Bangkok, Thailand	Decision	5	3:00
1989-09-19	Loss	(Thailand) Dejrit Sor.Ploenchit	Onesongchai, Lumpinee Stadium	Bangkok, Thailand	Decision	5	3:00
1989-08-18	Draw	(Thailand) Dejrit Sor.Ploenchit	Fairtex, Lumpinee Stadium	Bangkok, Thailand	Decision	5	3:00
1989-06-17	Loss	(Thailand) Namkabuan Nongkeepahuyuth	Lumpinee Stadium	Bangkok, Thailand	Decision	5	3:00
1989-05-02	Loss	(Thailand) Pairojnoi Sor.Siamchai	Lumpinee Stadium	Bangkok, Thailand	Decision	5	3:00
For the Lumpinee Stadium Mini Flyweight (105 lbs) title.
1989-04-	Win	(Thailand) Morakot Sor.Thamarangsri	Ramkomut Stadium	Pattani province, Thailand	Decision	5	3:00
1989-03-	Win	(Thailand) Phuengluang Kiatanan	Lumpinee Stadium	Bangkok, Thailand	Decision	5	3:00
1989-02-06	Win	(Thailand) Phuengluang Kiatanan	Ramkomut Stadium	Pattani province, Thailand	Decision	5	3:00
1988-11-29	Win	(Thailand) Denthaksin Kiatratthaphon	Ramkomut Stadium	Pattani province, Thailand	Decision	5	3:00
1988-11-04	Loss	(Thailand) Mawin Prasathinphimai	Onesongchai, Lumpinee Stadium	Bangkok, Thailand	Decision	5	3:00
1988-09-23	Win	(Thailand) Kukrit Sor.Nayaam	Onesongchai, Lumpinee Stadium	Bangkok, Thailand	Decision	5	3:00
1988-08-30	Loss	(Thailand) Pairojnoi Sor.Siamchai	Onesongchai, Lumpinee Stadium	Bangkok, Thailand	Decision	5	3:00
For the vacant Lumpinee Stadium Mini Flyweight (105 lbs) title.
1988-05-31	Win	(Thailand) Samad Phukrongfa	Onesongchai, Lumpinee Stadium	Bangkok, Thailand	Decision	5	3:00
1988-04-30	Win	(Thailand) Sathit Dechawalit	Rattanachote Stadium	Phatthalung province, Thailand	KO	3	
1988-04-08	Win	(Thailand) Pongsiri Por.Ruamrudee	Lumpinee Stadium	Bangkok, Thailand	Decision	5	3:00
1988-03-15	Win	(Thailand) Mawin Prasathinphimai	Onesongchai, Lumpinee Stadium	Bangkok, Thailand	KO	5	
1987-12-08	Loss	(Thailand) Pongsiri Por.Ruamrudee		Bangkok, Thailand	Decision	5	3:00
1987-10-02	Loss	(Thailand) Pairojnoi Sor.Siamchai	Lumpinee Stadium	Bangkok, Thailand	Decision	5	3:00
1987-06-30	Win	(Thailand) Panomrunglek Chor.Sawat	Chaomangkon, Lumpinee Stadium	Bangkok, Thailand	Decision	5	3:00
1987-06-07	Win	(Thailand) Supermint Kiatwankam	Royal Military Academy	Thailand	KO (Knees)	5	
1987-03-31	Loss	(Thailand) Morakot Sor.Thammarangsri	Onesongchai, Lumpinee Stadium	Bangkok, Thailand	Decision	5	3:00
1987-02-20	Loss	(Thailand) Panphet Muangsurin	Fairtex, Lumpinee Stadium	Bangkok, Thailand	Decision	5	3:00
1986-12-	Win	(Thailand) Songchainoi Por.Somjit	Lumpinee Stadium	Bangkok, Thailand	Decision	5	3:00
1986-11-	Win	(Thailand) Superlek Kiatchaiyut		Hat Yai, Thailand	TKO	5	
1986-10-07	Win	(Thailand) Phadet Kiatthanupet	Onesongchai, Lumpinee Stadium	Bangkok, Thailand	Decision	5	3:00
1986-09-	Win	(Thailand) Petchkasem Phayakwarin		Hat Yai, Thailand	Decision	5	3:00
1986-08-08	Win	(Thailand) Pahluthainoi Khuenphet	Chatuchok, Lumpinee Stadium	Bangkok, Thailand	Decision	5	3:00
1986-	Win	(Thailand) Daokhanong Sakdamnern	Lumpinee Stadium	Bangkok, Thailand	Decision	5	3:00
1986-	Win	(Thailand) Maneejiw Sor.Salakchai		Hat Yai, Thailand	Decision	5	3:00
1986-	Win	(Thailand) Kettorha Saklaempho		Yala province, Thailand	Decision	5	3:00
1986-	Win	(Thailand) Denpayom Kiatchaiyut		Phuket, Thailand	Decision	5	3:00
1986-	Loss	(Thailand) Superlek Kiatchaiyut		Thailand	Decision	5	3:00
1985-	Win	(Thailand) Sakdnoi Sitkhun		Hat Yai, Thailand	Decision	5	3:00
1985-	Win	(Thailand) Nuengthonnee Petchyindee		Hat Yai, Thailand	Decision	5	3:00
1985-	Win	(Thailand) Hongsawadi Singsakda		Hat Yai, Thailand	Decision	5	3:00
1985-	Loss	(Thailand) Nuengthonnee Petchyindee	Rajadamnern Stadium	Bangkok, Thailand	Decision	5	3:00
1985-	Draw	(Thailand) Kengsod Sitsia		Chumphon province, Thailand	Decision	5	3:00
1985-	Loss	(Thailand) Wangyu Sor.Ploenchit	Rajadamnern Stadium	Bangkok, Thailand	Decision	5	3:00
Legend: Win Loss Draw/No contest Notes
