= Pongsiri Por.Ruamrudee =

Pongsiri Por Ruamrudee
- Born: Paiboon Ladnongkee (ไพบูลย์ ลัดหนองขี); May 17, 1968 (age 58); Huai Thalaeng, Nakhon Ratchasima, Thailand
- Native name: พงษ์ศิริ พ.ร่วมฤดี
- Other names: Pongsiri Ladnongkee (พงษ์ศิริ ลัดหนองขี); Rambo
- Nationality: Thai
- Height: 166 cm (5 ft 5 in)
- Weight: 51 kg (112 lb; 8 st 0 lb)
- Division: Flyweight; Junior bantamweight Featherweight
- Style: Muay Thai (Muay Bouk)
- Years active: 1980–1993

Other information
- Children: Rambonoi Ladnongkee (son)

Pongsiri Por Ruamrudee (Thai: พงษ์ศิริ พ.ร่วมฤดี), is a former Thai Muay Thai kickboxer, widely known by his nickname "Rambo", which became his popular moniker during the golden era of Muay Thai (the 1980s and 1990s). Despite never having held a championship title, he remained one of the most beloved and popular fighters of his time.

== Biography & career ==
Por Ruamrudee was born as Paiboon Ladnongkee (ไพบูลย์ ลัดหนองขี) in Tambon Mueang Phlapphla, Amphoe Huai Thalaeng, Nakhon Ratchasima Province, northeastern Thailand.

He started fighting at the age of 12 with the support of his father, who was a fighting enthusiast. He made his debut at Rajadamnern Stadium, winning by knockout in the second round.

Por Ruamrudee gained wider recognition when he fought in the "Suek Onesongchai" event promoted by Songchai Rattanasuban, knocking out Tepparith Sor Naya-arm in the second round. This fight made him well known among Muay Thai fans.

Due to his small build, he developed a tough, relentless style. He was a fighter who never backed down, constantly pushing forward with aggressive attacks.

As a result, Por Ruamrudee earned the nickname "Rambo", a reference to the Sylvester Stallone movie character. Before each fight, his team would wave a large black pirate flag, and his trunks bore a "skull and crossbones" symbol as his signature look.

In 1988, his second fight against Pairojnoi "Bloody Steel" Sor Siamchai was named Fight of the Year and became widely known as the "Fight of the Century" in Muay Thai. This bout is regarded as a milestone in modern Muay Thai history, setting a record with total entrance fees reaching 3,200,000 baht for the first time.

== Retirement ==
Por Ruamrudee retired at the age of 25. After retirement, he became a nightclub singer.

In early August 2016, he returned from retirement to face his old rival Langsuan Panyuthaphum in a special event at Rajadamnern Stadium. The result was a draw.

He currently has a son who is a Muay Thai fighter like him, and he works as a Muay Thai trainer for those interested at a gym in the Taling Chan area, Bangkok.

== Titles & honours ==
- Lumpinee Stadium
  - 1988 Lumpinee Stadium Fight of the Year (vs. Pairojnoi Sor Siamchai on November 4)
  - 1989 Fan Favorite Award
  - 1989 Lumpinee Stadium Fight of the Year (vs. Paruhatlek Sitchunthong)

== Fight record ==
Muay Thai Record (Incomplete)
Date	Result	Opponent	Event	Location	Method	Round	Time
2004-12-07	Draw	(Thailand) Samson Isaan	Lumpinee Stadium Birthday Show	Bangkok, Thailand	Decision	5	3:00
1991-07-02	Loss	(Thailand) Langsuan Panyuthaphum	Lumpinee Stadium	Bangkok, Thailand	KO (Knees)	4	
1991-06-14	Win	(Thailand) Panphet Muangsurin	Lumpinee Stadium	Bangkok, Thailand	Decision	5	3:00
1991-05-24	Win	(Japan) Michiaki Yamazaki	MAJKF	Tokyo, Japan	Decision (Unanimous)	5	3:08
1991-05-10	Win	(Thailand) Tukatathong Por.Pongsawang	Lumpinee Stadium	Bangkok, Thailand	Decision	5	3:00
1991-	Loss	(Thailand) Jomwo Sittongchai	Lumpinee Stadium	Bangkok, Thailand	Decision	5	3:00
1991-	Loss	(Thailand) Yodawut Sor.Totsapon		Thailand	Decision	5	3:00
1991-01-29	Win	(Thailand) Singthongnoi Sor.Siamchai	Onesongchai, Lumpinee Stadium	Bangkok, Thailand	Decision	5	3:00
1990-10-30	Loss	(Thailand) Tukatathong Por.Pongsawang	Lumpinee Stadium	Bangkok, Thailand	KO (Punches)	1	
1990-09-25	Win	(Thailand) Chandet Sor.Prantalay	Lumpinee Stadium	Bangkok, Thailand	Decision	5	3:00
1990-08-15	Loss	(Thailand) Orono Por.MuangUbon	Rajadamnern Stadium	Bangkok, Thailand	Decision	5	3:00
1990-07-20	Loss	(Thailand) Jaroensap Kiatbanchong	Lumpinee Stadium	Bangkok, Thailand	Decision	5	3:00
1990-07-06	Win	(Japan) Michiaki Yamazaki	MAJKF	Tokyo, Japan	TKO (3 Knockdowns)	2	2:08
1990-06-08	Loss	(Thailand) Chainoi Muangsurin	Onesongchai, Lumpinee Stadium	Bangkok, Thailand	KO	3	
1990-05-18	Win	(France) Jaid Seddak	MAJKF	Tokyo, Japan	Decision	5	3:00
1990-04-30	Win	(Thailand) Paruhatlek Sitchunthong	Lumpinee Stadium	Bangkok, Thailand	Decision	5	3:00
1990-04-27	Loss	(Thailand) Chainoi Muangsurin	Lumpinee Stadium	Bangkok, Thailand	Decision	5	3:00
1990-04-10	Loss	(Thailand) Langsuan Panyuthaphum	Lumpinee Stadium	Bangkok, Thailand	Decision	5	3:00
1990-02-18	Win	(Netherlands) Mikael Lieuwfat		Amsterdam, Netherlands	Decision	5	3:00
1990-01-30	Win	(Thailand) Paruhatlek Sitchunthong	Lumpinee Stadium	Bangkok, Thailand	Decision	5	3:00
1990-01-06	Loss	(Thailand) Panphet Muangsurin	Lumpinee Stadium	Bangkok, Thailand	Decision	5	3:00
1989-08-29	Loss	(Thailand) Boonlong Sor.Thanikul	Lumpinee Stadium	Bangkok, Thailand	KO	3	
1989-07-25	Loss	(Thailand) Pairojnoi Sor.Siamchai	Lumpinee Stadium	Bangkok, Thailand	Decision	5	3:00
1989-05-30	Loss	(Thailand) Karuhat Sor.Supawan	Lumpinee Stadium	Bangkok, Thailand	Decision	5	3:00
1989-05-02	Win	(Thailand) Toto Por Pongsawang	Lumpinee Stadium	Bangkok, Thailand	Decision	5	3:00
1989-02-11	Win	(Thailand) Toto Por Pongsawang		Nakhon Ratchasima, Thailand	Decision	5	3:00
1989-01-06	Loss	(Thailand) Paruhatlek Sitchunthong	Lumpinee Stadium	Bangkok, Thailand	Decision	5	3:00
1988-12-02	Loss	(Thailand) Langsuan Panyuthaphum	Lumpinee Stadium	Bangkok, Thailand	Decision	5	3:00
1988-11-04	Win	(Thailand) Pairojnoi Sor.Siamchai	Lumpinee Stadium	Bangkok, Thailand	Decision	5	3:00
1988-10-11	Draw	(Thailand) Pairojnoi Sor.Siamchai	Lumpinee Stadium	Bangkok, Thailand	Decision	5	3:00
1988-08-30	Win	(Thailand) Saeksan Sitjomthong	Lumpinee Stadium	Bangkok, Thailand	Decision	5	3:00
1988-07-26	Win	(Thailand) Hippy Singmanee	Lumpinee Stadium	Bangkok, Thailand	Decision	5	3:00
1988-06-28	Win	(Thailand) Toto Por Pongsawang	Lumpinee Stadium	Bangkok, Thailand	Decision	5	3:00
1988-05-31	Win	(Thailand) Morakot Sor.Tamarangsri	Lumpinee Stadium	Bangkok, Thailand	Decision	5	3:00
1988-05-03	Win	(Thailand) Pichit Sitbangprachan	Lumpinee Stadium	Bangkok, Thailand	Decision	5	3:00
1988-04-08	Loss	(Thailand) Kompayak Singmanee	Lumpinee Stadium	Bangkok, Thailand	Decision	5	3:00
1988-03-04	Loss	(Thailand) Panphet Muangsurin	Lumpinee Stadium	Bangkok, Thailand	KO	2	
1988-01-22	Win	(Thailand) Chainoi Muangsurin		Bangkok, Thailand	Decision	5	3:00
1987-12-08	Win	(Thailand) Kompayak Singmanee		Bangkok, Thailand	Decision	5	3:00
1987-11-13	Win	(Thailand) Amnatsak Sor.Sinsawat	Lumpinee Stadium	Bangkok, Thailand	KO (Punches)	4	
1987-10-07	Win	(Thailand) Yuenyong Kiatmongkol	Rajadamnern Stadium	Bangkok, Thailand	Decision	5	3:00
1987-07-31	Loss	(Thailand) Toto Por Pongsawang	Lumpinee Stadium	Bangkok, Thailand	KO	2	
1987-06-02	Win	(Thailand) Daengnoi Por.Bunya	Lumpinee Stadium	Bangkok, Thailand	KO	4	
1987-05-01	Loss	(Thailand) Songchainoi Por.SomchitAir	Lumpinee Stadium	Bangkok, Thailand	KO	2	
1987-04-10	Win	(Thailand) Nuaphet Saksamut	Lumpinee Stadium	Bangkok, Thailand	Decision	5	3:00
1987-03-06	Loss	(Thailand) Panomrunglek Chor.Sawat	Lumpinee Stadium	Bangkok, Thailand	Decision	5	3:00
1987-02-10	Win	(Thailand) Komkai Kiatcharoen	Lumpinee Stadium	Bangkok, Thailand	Decision	5	3:00
1987-01-06	Win	(Thailand) Patcharin Sripatcharin		Bangkok, Thailand	Decision	5	3:00
1986-09-12	Win	(Thailand) Komkai Kiatcharoen	Lumpinee Stadium	Bangkok, Thailand	Decision	5	3:00
1986-08-22	Win	(Thailand) Danchailek Chor. Sawat	Lumpinee Stadium	Bangkok, Thailand	KO	2	
1986-07-15	Win	(Thailand) Phadej Kietthanupetch	Lumpinee Stadium	Bangkok, Thailand	Decision	5	3:00
Legend: Win Loss Draw/No contest Notes
