= Jaroensap Kiatbanchong =

Thai former professional Muay Thai fighter

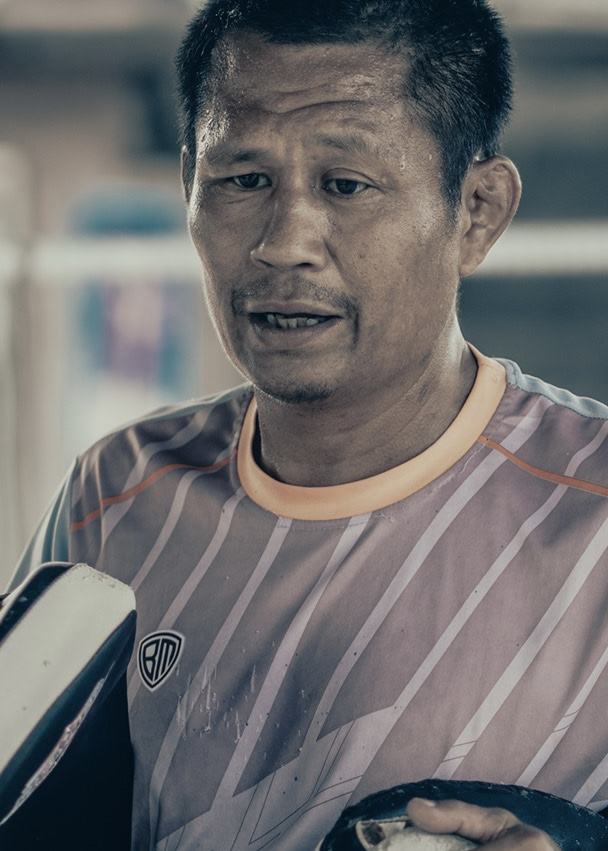
- Jaroensap in 2023
- Born: Taweesak Ratanakoch; September 29, 1971 (age 55); Thung Song, Nakhon Si Thammarat, Thailand
- Native name: เจริญทรัพย์ เกียรติบ้านช่อง
- Other names: Jaroensap Thipchanglampang (เจริญทรัพย์ ทิพย์ช้างลำปาง); Jaroensap Don Golf Service (เจริญทรัพย์ ดอนกอล์ฟเซอร์วิส)
- Nickname: Diamond Hearted Top Boxer (ยอดมวยใจเพชร)
- Height: 170 cm (5 ft 7 in)
- Division: Mini Flyweight; Light Flyweight; Flyweight; Super Flyweight
- Style: Muay Thai (Muay Femur)
- Stance: Orthodox
- Team: Kiatbanchong Gym

Other information
- Occupation: Muay Thai fighter (retired); Muay Thai trainer
- Notable relatives: Jaroenwit Kiatbanchong

Taweesak Ratanakoch (Thai: ทวีศักดิ์ รัตนคช; born 29 September 1971), known professionally as Jaroensap Kiatbanchong (Thai: เจริญทรัพย์ เกียรติบ้านช่อง), is a Thai former professional Muay Thai fighter. He is a former two-division Lumpinee Stadium champion, as well as the 1992 Sport Writers Association of Thailand Fighter of the Year, who was famous during the 1990s.

== After career ==
After retiring from competition Jaroensap opened a gym called Sit Jaroensap in Pathum Thani. He teaches to fighters competing in Bangkok such as Phetsongpark Sitjaroensap, Phtesongkom Sitjaroensap and his son Fourwin Sitjaroensap who won an IFMA Youth World title in 2017 and the True4U 108 lbs title in 2018.

== Titles and accomplishments ==
- Lumpinee Stadium
  - 1991 Lumpinee Stadium Flyweight (112 lbs) Champion
    - Two successful title defenses
  - 1992 Lumpinee Stadium Super Flyweight (115 lbs) Champion
    - One successful title defense

Awards

- 1992 Sport Writers Association of Thailand Fighter of the Year

== Muay Thai record ==
Muay Thai Record (Incomplete)
Date	Result	Opponent	Event	Location	Method	Round	Time
2013-12-	Win	(Thailand) Nungubon Sitlerchai	Lumpinee Stadium	Bangkok, Thailand	Decision	5	3:00
2013-05-10	Loss	Thailand Pinsinchai	Rajadamnern Stadium	Bangkok, Thailand	Decision	5	3:00
For a 1 million baht side-bet.
2013-03-06	Win	(Thailand) Nungubon Sitlerchai	Rajadamnern Stadium	Bangkok, Thailand	Decision	5	3:00
2013-01-21	Win	(Thailand) Lakhin Wassandasit		Nakhon Si Thammarat, Thailand	Decision	5	3:00
2006-02-26	Loss	(England) Liam Harrison	Patong Stadium	Phuket, Thailand	TKO (Ref Stop)	2	3:00
2001-04-25		(Thailand) Chalamlek Sor.Utapaogym	Rajadamnern Stadium	Bangkok, Thailand			
2001-02-18	Win	(Thailand) Namphonlek Nongkeepahuyuth	Samrong Stadium	Samut Prakan, Thailand	Decision	5	3:00
2001-01-14	Win	(Thailand) Amnuaypon Bor.Kor.Sor	Samrong Stadium	Samut Prakan, Thailand	Decision	5	3:00
2000-09-03	Win	(Thailand) Kasemlek Sakthewan		Bangkok, Thailand			
2000-07-08	Loss	(Thailand) Sakpaitoon Decharat	Lumpinee Stadium	Bangkok, Thailand	KO	3	
2000-04-29	Win	(Thailand) Singthongnoi Sitsaengaroon	Lumpinee Stadium	Bangkok, Thailand	Decision	5	3:00
2000-02-06	Win	(Thailand) Choengnoen BoonsongTransport	Samrong Stadium	Samut Prakan, Thailand	Decision	5	3:00
1999-11-19	Win	(Thailand) Bandonglek Bunthawee	Lumpinee Stadium	Bangkok, Thailand	Decision	5	3:00
1999-10-17	Win	(Thailand) Dewid Looksamrong		Chachoengsao Province, Thailand	Decision	5	3:00
1999-08-07	Loss	(Thailand) Singthongnoi Sitsaengaroon	Lumpinee Stadium	Bangkok, Thailand	Decision	5	3:00
1999-07-06	Win	(Thailand) Rungroj Por.Sawadee		Thung Song, Thailand	Decision	5	3:00
1995-09-16	Win	(Thailand) Bandonglek Bunthawee	Lumpinee Stadium	Bangkok, Thailand	Decision	5	3:00
1995-04-04	Loss	(Thailand) Chatpon Dejrat	Lumpinee Stadium	Bangkok, Thailand	Decision	5	3:00
1994-09-24	Loss	(Thailand) Boonthawon Singhuaikaew	Lumpinee Stadium	Bangkok, Thailand	TKO (Low kicks)	2	
1994-	Win	(Thailand) Singhao Tor.Hintok		Bangkok, Thailand			
1994-	Win	(Thailand) Sornsueknoi Sakwichan		Bangkok, Thailand			
1994-04-02	Loss	(Thailand) Saengmorakot Sor.Ploenchit	Lumpinee Stadium	Bangkok, Thailand	Decision	5	3:00
1994-01-28	Loss	(Thailand) Kaoponglek Luksuratham	Lumpinee Stadium	Bangkok, Thailand			
1993-12-24	Loss	(Thailand) Samkor Chor.Ratchatasupak	Lumpinee Stadium	Bangkok, Thailand	Decision	5	3:00
1993-11-16	Loss	(Thailand) Kruekchai Kaewsamrit	Lumpinee Stadium	Bangkok, Thailand	Decision	5	3:00
1993-09-17	Loss	(Thailand) Hansuk Prasathinpanomrung	Lumpinee Stadium	Bangkok, Thailand	Decision	5	3:00
1993-08-31	Loss	(Thailand) Wangchannoi Sor Palangchai	Lumpinee Stadium	Bangkok, Thailand	Decision	5	3:00
1993-07-09	Loss	(Thailand) Chatchai Paiseetong	Lumpinee Stadium	Bangkok, Thailand	KO (Spinning back Elbow)	5	
1993-06-08	Win	(Thailand) Nungubon Sitlerchai	Lumpinee Stadium	Bangkok, Thailand	Decision	5	3:00
1993-04-30	Loss	(Thailand) Lamnamoon Sor.Sumalee	Lumpinee Stadium	Bangkok, Thailand	Decision (Unanimous)	5	3:00
Loses the Lumpinee Stadium Super Flyweight (115 lbs) title.
1993-04-06	Loss	(Thailand) Boonlai Sor.Thanikul	Lumpinee Stadium	Bangkok, Thailand	Decision	5	3:00
1993-03-23	Win	(Thailand) Lakhin Wassandasit	Rajadamnern Stadium	Bangkok, Thailand	Decision	5	3:00
1993-02-05	Win	(Thailand) Nungubon Sitlerchai	Lumpinee Stadium	Bangkok, Thailand	Decision	5	3:00
1993-01-08	Loss	(Thailand) Kaensak Sor.Ploenjit	Lumpinee Stadium	Bangkok, Thailand	Decision	5	3:00
1992-12-04	Win	(Thailand) Kaensak Sor.Ploenjit	Lumpinee Stadium	Bangkok, Thailand	Decision	5	3:00
1992-11-06	Draw	(Thailand) Lamnamoon Sor.Sumalee	Lumpinee Stadium	Bangkok, Thailand	Decision (Split)	5	3:00
Defends the Lumpinee Stadium Super Flyweight (115 lbs) title.
1992-	Win	(Thailand) Dokmaipa Por Pongsawang	Lumpinee Stadium	Bangkok, Thailand	Decision	5	3:00
1992-08-07	Win	(Thailand) Langsuan Panyuthaphum	Lumpinee Stadium	Bangkok, Thailand	KO (Punches)	2	
Wins the Lumpinee Stadium Super Flyweight (115 lbs) title and the 2 million baht side-bet.
1992-07-07	Win	(Thailand) Chainoi Muangsurin	Lumpinee Stadium	Bangkok, Thailand	Decision	5	3:00
1992-06-23	Win	(Thailand) Wichan Sitsuchon	Lumpinee Stadium	Bangkok, Thailand	Decision	5	3:00
1992-05-	Win	(Thailand) Pompetch Naratrkiul	Lumpinee Stadium	Bangkok, Thailand	Decision	5	3:00
1992-04-	Loss	(Thailand) Samingprai Sor.Rungnakorn	Lumpinee Stadium	Bangkok, Thailand	Decision	5	3:00
1992-03-14	Win	(Thailand) Moohok Tor.Hintok	Lumpinee Stadium	Bangkok, Thailand	Decision	5	3:00
1992-02-21	Win	(Thailand) Moohok Tor.Hintok	Lumpinee Stadium	Bangkok, Thailand	Decision	5	3:00
1992-01-21	Loss	(Thailand) Tukatathong Por.Pongsawang	Lumpinee Stadium	Bangkok, Thailand	Decision	5	3:00
1992-01-	Win	(Thailand) Detduang Por.Pongsawang	Lumpinee Stadium	Bangkok, Thailand	Decision	5	3:00
1991-12-05	Win	(Thailand) Pompetch Kiatchatpayak	Lumpinee Stadium	Bangkok, Thailand	Decision	5	3:00
1991-11-04	Loss	(Thailand) Karuhat Sor.Supawan	OneSongchai	New Zealand	Decision	5	3:00
For the International Lumpinee Stadium Flyweight (112 lbs) title.
1991-09-27	Loss	(Thailand) Panphet Muangsurin	Lumpinee Stadium	Bangkok, Thailand	TKO (Doctor stoppage)	2	
1991-09-03	Loss	(Thailand) Dokmaipa Por Pongsawang	Lumpinee Stadium	Bangkok, Thailand	Decision	5	3:00
1991-08-14	Loss	(Thailand) Tukatathong Por.Pongsawang	Rajadamnern Stadium	Bangkok, Thailand	Decision	5	3:00
1991-07-16	Win	(Thailand) Duangsompong Por Pongsawang	Lumpinee Stadium	Bangkok, Thailand	Decision	5	3:00
1991-06-28	Loss	(Thailand) Nungubon Sitlerchai	Lumpinee Stadium	Bangkok, Thailand	Decision	5	3:00
1991-05-31	Loss	(Thailand) Langsuan Panyuthaphum	Lumpinee Stadium	Bangkok, Thailand	Decision	5	3:00
Loses the Lumpinee Stadium Flyweight (112 lbs) title.
1991-04-30	Loss	(Thailand) Langsuan Panyuthaphum	Lumpinee Stadium	Bangkok, Thailand	Decision	5	3:00
1991-03-29	Win	(Thailand) Duangsompong Por Pongsawang	Lumpinee Stadium	Bangkok, Thailand	Decision	5	3:00
1991-02-23	Win	(Thailand) Pairojnoi Sor Siamchai	Lumpinee Stadium	Bangkok, Thailand	Decision	5	3:00
Defends the Lumpinee Stadium Flyweight (112 lbs) title.
1991-01-21	Loss	(Thailand) Mathee Jadeepitak	Rajadamnern Stadium	Bangkok, Thailand	Decision	5	3:00
1990-12-11	Win	(Thailand) Detduang Por.Pongsawang	Lumpinee Stadium	Bangkok, Thailand	KO	3	
1990-11-20	Win	(Thailand) Langsuan Panyuthaphum	Lumpinee Stadium	Bangkok, Thailand	Decision	5	3:00
1990-10-07	Win	(Thailand) Chainoi Muangsurin		New Zealand	Decision	5	3:00
Defends the Lumpinee Stadium Flyweight (112 lbs) title.
1990-08-31	Win	(Thailand) Chainoi Muangsurin	Lumpinee Stadium	Bangkok, Thailand	Decision	5	3:00
Wins the Lumpinee Stadium Flyweight (112 lbs) title.
1990-07-20	Win	(Thailand) Pongsiri Por Ruamrudee	Lumpinee Stadium	Bangkok, Thailand	Decision	5	3:00
1990-06-08	Win	(Thailand) Hippy Singmanee	Lumpinee Stadium	Bangkok, Thailand	KO	2	
1990-05-21	Loss	(Thailand) Kompayak Singmanee	Rajadamnern Stadium	Bangkok, Thailand	Decision	5	3:00
1990-05-04	Win	(Thailand) Duangsompong Por Pongsawang	Lumpinee Stadium	Bangkok, Thailand	Decision	5	3:00
1990-04-18	Win	(Thailand) Saengdao Kiatanan	Rajadamnern Stadium	Bangkok, Thailand	Decision	5	3:00
1990-03-25	Win	(Thailand) Duangsompong Por.Pongsawang	Lumpinee Stadium	Bangkok, Thailand	Decision	5	3:00
1990-03-06	Draw	(Thailand) Nungubon Sitlerchai	Lumpinee Stadium	Bangkok, Thailand	Decision	5	3:00
1990-01-25	Win	(Thailand) Tukatathong Por.Pongsawang	Lumpinee Stadium	Bangkok, Thailand	Decision	5	3:00
1989-	Loss	(Thailand) Saengdao Kiatanan	Lumpinee Stadium	Bangkok, Thailand	Decision	5	3:00
For the vacant Lumpinee Stadium Mini Flyweight (105 lbs) title.
1989-10-20	Loss	Thailand Pinsinchai	Onesongchai, Lumpinee Stadium	Bangkok, Thailand	Decision	5	3:00
1989-09-08	Win	(Thailand) Singthongnoi Sor.Siamchai	Lumpinee Stadium	Bangkok, Thailand	Decision	5	3:00
1989-07-22	Win	(Thailand) Singthongnoi Sor.Siamchai	Lumpinee Stadium	Bangkok, Thailand	Decision	5	3:00
1989-07-01	Win	(Thailand) Moohok Tor.Hintok	Lumpinee Stadium	Bangkok, Thailand	Decision	5	3:00
1989-06-13	Win	(Thailand) Nungubon Sitlerchai	Lumpinee Stadium	Bangkok, Thailand	Decision	5	3:00
1989-05-05	Win	(Thailand) Songchainoi Por.SomchitAir	Lumpinee Stadium	Bangkok, Thailand	TKO	3	
1989-04-18	Win	(Thailand) Methanoi Sor.Maliwan	Lumpinee Stadium	Bangkok, Thailand	Decision	5	3:00
1989-03-18	Loss	(Thailand) Kwanla Sitbangprachan	Lumpinee Stadium	Bangkok, Thailand	KO (Left hook)	5	
1989-03-04	Win	(Thailand) Saenchai Phetbangko	Lumpinee Stadium	Bangkok, Thailand	Decision	5	3:00
1989-02-17	Win	(Thailand) Audnoi Sor.Manachai	Lumpinee Stadium	Bangkok, Thailand	Decision	5	3:00
1988-12-16	Loss	(Thailand) Orono Por Muang Ubon	Lumpinee Stadium	Bangkok, Thailand	Decision	5	3:00
Legend: Win Loss Draw/No contest Notes
