= Pairojnoi Sor.Siamchai =

Thai former professional Muay Thai fighter

- Born: Dhamniyom Thavorn; June 19, 1968 (age 58); Bang Pakong, Chachoengsao, Thailand
- Native name: ธรรมนิยม ถาวร
- Nickname: Bloody Iron (ไอ้เลือดเหล็ก)
- Height: 166 cm (5 ft 5 in)
- Division: Mini Flyweight; Flyweight
- Style: Muay Thai (Muay Khao)
- Stance: Orthodox
- Years active: c. 1977–1996

Other information
- Occupation: Muay Thai trainer

Dhamniyom Thavorn (Thai: ธรรมนิยม ถาวร; born June 19, 1968), known professionally as Pairojnoi Sor.Siamchai (Thai: ไพโรจน์น้อย ส.สยามชัย), is a Thai former professional Muay Thai fighter. He is a former Lumpinee Stadium Mini Flyweight Champion who was famous during the 1980s and 1990s.

== Biography and career ==
Pairojnoi is an orphan who grew up in the Chachoengsao province, in a temple known for taking care of homeless children. He started Muay Thai training at the age of 9, he had his first fights in the nearby temples.

In 1985 he was scouted by the Songchai promotion and began his ascension at Lumpinee stadium in the 105 lbs division where he became popular for his aggressive style. On August 30, 1988, Pairojnoi won the Lumpinee Stadium title left vacant by Hippy Singmanee against the former champion's brother Kompayak Singmanee.

Pairojnoi's fight against Pongsiri Por Ruamrudee on July 25, 1989, was the headline bout for a card that broke records at Lumpinee stadium with a 3 million baht gate and over 10,000 spectators. On November 4, his second fight against Pongsiri "Rambo" was elected "Fight of the Year" and became known as the fight of the century for Muay Thai.

After his career Pairojnoi became a trainer in various countries. He had a notable contribution to the growth of the Brazilian muay thai scene. He was working at the Kor Romsritong camp until its closure, he then joined the Sitsongpeenong before opening his own gym in Samut Sakhon.

In May 2022, Pairojnoi had emergency heart surgery after he collapsed. He recovered from the operation.

== Titles and accomplishments ==
- Lumpinee Stadium
  - 1988 Lumpinee Stadium Fight of the Year (vs. Pongsiri Por Ruamrudee on November 4)
  - 1988 Lumpinee Stadium Mini Flyweight (105 lbs) Champion
    - One successful title defense

== Fight record ==
Muay Thai Record
| Date | Result | Opponent | Event | Location | Method | Round | Time |
|---|---|---|---|---|---|---|---|
| 1997-01-13 | Loss | (Thailand) Nungthonnee Singkongpan | Kiatsingnoi, Rajadamnern Stadium | Bangkok, Thailand | Decision | 5 | 3:00 |
| 1996-09-05 | Loss | (Thailand) Silachai Vor Preecha | Rajadamnern Stadium | Bangkok, Thailand | Decision | 5 | 3:00 |
| 1996-08-24 | Loss | (Thailand) Tukatathong Por.Pongsawang | Lumpinee Stadium | Bangkok, Thailand | Decision | 5 | 3:00 |
| 1996-07-06 | Loss | (Thailand) Saenchai Jirakriengkrai | Lumpinee Stadium | Bangkok, Thailand | Decision | 5 | 3:00 |
| 1995-08-04 | Win | (Thailand) Sak-Ubon Por Muang Ubon | Lumpinee Stadium | Bangkok, Thailand | Decision | 5 | 3:00 |
| 1995- | Loss | (Thailand) Nuengpichit Sityodtong | Lumpinee Stadium | Bangkok, Thailand | Decision | 5 | 3:00 |
| 1995-05-19 | Win | (Thailand) Netnarin Fairtex | Lumpinee Stadium | Bangkok, Thailand | Decision | 5 | 3:00 |
| 1995-04-28 | Loss | (Thailand) Sod Looknongyangtoy | Lumpinee Stadium | Bangkok, Thailand | Decision | 5 | 3:00 |
| 1995-03-13 | Loss | (Thailand) Silachai Vor Preecha | Rajadamnern Stadium | Bangkok, Thailand | Decision | 5 | 3:00 |
| 1994-12-23 | Loss | (Thailand) Sittichai Petchbangprang | Lumpinee Stadium | Bangkok, Thailand | Decision | 5 | 3:00 |
| 1994-11-29 | Loss | (Thailand) Rattanachai Wor.Walapon | Lumpinee Stadium | Bangkok, Thailand | Decision | 5 | 3:00 |
| 1994-07-09 | Win | (Thailand) Singthong Lukrangsee | Lumpinee Stadium | Bangkok, Thailand | Decision | 5 | 3:00 |
| 1994-04-29 | Loss | (Thailand) Pudphadlek Sor.Chalermchai | Lumpinee Stadium | Bangkok, Thailand | Decision | 5 | 3:00 |
| 1994-01-24 | Loss | (Thailand) Kunasin Sor.Jongkit | Rajadamnern Stadium | Bangkok, Thailand | Decision | 5 | 3:00 |
| 1994-01-01 | Loss | (Thailand) Rambolek Por.Chuanchuen | Lumpinee Stadium | Bangkok, Thailand | Decision | 5 | 3:00 |
| 1992-02-22 | Loss | (Thailand) Lamnamoon Sor.Sumalee | Lumpinee Stadium | Bangkok, Thailand | Decision | 5 | 3:00 |
| 1992-01-10 | Loss | (Thailand) Singhao Tor.Hintok | Lumpinee Stadium | Bangkok, Thailand | Decision | 5 | 3:00 |
| 1991-12-10 | Loss | (Thailand) Kongklai SitKruOd | Lumpinee Stadium | Bangkok, Thailand | Decision | 5 | 3:00 |
| 1991-07-12 | Win | (Thailand) Supernoi Sor.Kettalingchan | Lumpinee Stadium | Bangkok, Thailand | KO | 4 | |
| 1991-06-14 | Loss | (Thailand) Nungubon Sitlerchai | Lumpinee Stadium | Bangkok, Thailand | Decision | 5 | 3:00 |
| 1991-03-25 | Loss | (Thailand) Thongchai Tor.Silachai | Lumpinee Stadium | Bangkok, Thailand | Decision | 5 | 3:00 |
| 1991-02-23 | Loss | (Thailand) Jaroensap Kiatbanchong | Lumpinee Stadium | Bangkok, Thailand | Decision | 5 | 3:00 |
For the Lumpinee Stadium Flyweight (112 lbs) title.
| 1991-01-25 | Win | (Thailand) Pornsak Muangsurin | Lumpinee Stadium | Bangkok, Thailand | Decision | 5 | 3:00 |
| 1990-12-04 | Win | (Thailand) Kruekchai Sor.Kettalingchan | Lumpinee Stadium | Bangkok, Thailand | Decision | 5 | 3:00 |
| 1990-11-03 | Win | (Thailand) D-Day Kiatmuangkan | Lumpinee Stadium | Bangkok, Thailand | Decision | 5 | 3:00 |
| 1990-10-05 | Win | Thailand Pinsinchai | Lumpinee Stadium | Bangkok, Thailand | Decision | 5 | 3:00 |
| 1990-09-17 | Loss | (Thailand) Sornsuknoi Sakwichian | Lumpinee Stadium | Bangkok, Thailand | Decision | 5 | 3:00 |
| 1990-08-25 | Win | (Thailand) Pornsak Muangsurin | Lumpinee Stadium | Bangkok, Thailand | Decision | 5 | 3:00 |
| 1990-08-03 | Loss | (Thailand) Kompayak Singmanee | Lumpinee Stadium | Bangkok, Thailand | Decision | 5 | 3:00 |
| 1990-06-29 | Loss | (Thailand) Tukatathong Por.Pongsawang | Lumpinee Stadium | Bangkok, Thailand | Decision | 5 | 3:00 |
| 1990-06-08 | Win | (Thailand) Kruekchai Sor.Kettalingchan | Lumpinee Stadium | Bangkok, Thailand | Decision | 5 | 3:00 |
| 1990-05-01 | Loss | (Thailand) Tukatathong Por.Pongsawang | Lumpinee Stadium | Bangkok, Thailand | Decision | 5 | 3:00 |
| 1990-04-10 | Loss | (Thailand) Karuhat Sor.Supawan | Lumpinee Stadium | Bangkok, Thailand | Decision | 5 | 3:00 |
For the vacant Lumpinee Stadium Flyweight (112 lbs) title.
| 1990-03-06 | Win | (Thailand) Toto Por Pongsawang | Lumpinee Stadium | Bangkok, Thailand | Decision | 5 | 3:00 |
| 1990-01-19 | Loss | (Thailand) Toto Por Pongsawang | Lumpinee Stadium | Bangkok, Thailand | KO (High kick) | 5 | |
| 1989-12-18 | Win | (Thailand) Chainoi Muangsurin | Lumpinee Stadium | Bangkok, Thailand | Decision | 5 | 3:00 |
| 1989-11-28 | Loss | (Thailand) Namkabuan Nongkeepahuyuth | Lumpinee Stadium | Bangkok, Thailand | Decision | 5 | 3:00 |
| 1989-11-07 | Loss | (Thailand) Oley Kiatoneway | Lumpinee Stadium | Bangkok, Thailand | Decision | 5 | 3:00 |
| 1989-10-20 | Win | (Thailand) Paruhatlek Sitchunthong | Lumpinee Stadium | Bangkok, Thailand | Decision | 5 | 3:00 |
| 1989-09-08 | Draw | (Thailand) Paruhatlek Sitchunthong | Lumpinee Stadium | Bangkok, Thailand | Decision | 5 | 3:00 |
| 1989-08-15 | Draw | (Thailand) Paruhatlek Sitchunthong | Lumpinee Stadium | Bangkok, Thailand | Decision | 5 | 3:00 |
| 1989-07-25 | Win | (Thailand) Pongsiri Por.Ruamrudee | Lumpinee Stadium | Bangkok, Thailand | Decision | 5 | 3:00 |
| 1989-05-30 | Draw | (Thailand) Paruhatlek Sitchunthong | Lumpinee Stadium | Bangkok, Thailand | Decision | 5 | 3:00 |
| 1989-05-02 | Win | (Thailand) Kompayak Singmanee | Lumpinee Stadium | Bangkok, Thailand | Decision | 5 | 3:00 |
Defends the Lumpinee Stadium Mini Flyweight (105 lbs) title.
| 1989-04-07 | Win | (Thailand) Seesot Sahakarnosot | Lumpinee Stadium | Bangkok, Thailand | Decision | 5 | 3:00 |
| 1989-02-24 | Win | (Thailand) Denthaksin Kiatratthapol | Lumpinee Stadium | Bangkok, Thailand | Decision | 5 | 3:00 |
| 1989-01-31 | Win | (Thailand) Mawin Sor.Ploenchit | Lumpinee Stadium | Bangkok, Thailand | Decision | 5 | 3:00 |
| 1988-12-02 | Loss | (Thailand) Toto Por.Pongsawang | Lumpinee Stadium | Bangkok, Thailand | Decision | 5 | 3:00 |
| 1988-11-04 | Loss | (Thailand) Pongsiri Por.Ruamrudee | Lumpinee Stadium | Bangkok, Thailand | Decision | 5 | 3:00 |
| 1988-10-11 | Draw | (Thailand) Pongsiri Por.Ruamrudee | Lumpinee Stadium | Bangkok, Thailand | Decision | 5 | 3:00 |
| 1988-08-30 | Win | (Thailand) Kompayak Singmanee | Lumpinee Stadium | Bangkok, Thailand | Decision | 5 | 3:00 |
Wins the vacant Lumpinee Stadium Mini Flyweight (105 lbs) title.
| 1988-07-08 | Win | (Thailand) Pungluang Kiatanan | Lumpinee Stadium | Bangkok, Thailand | Decision | 5 | 3:00 |
| 1988-06-10 | Draw | (Thailand) Saeksan Sitjomthong | Lumpinee Stadium | Bangkok, Thailand | Decision | 5 | 3:00 |
| 1988-05-03 | Loss | (Thailand) Karuhat Sor.Supawan | Lumpinee Stadium | Bangkok, Thailand | Decision | 5 | 3:00 |
| 1988-03-25 | Win | (Thailand) Morakot Sor.Tamarangsri | Lumpinee Stadium | Bangkok, Thailand | Decision | 5 | 3:00 |
| 1988-03-04 | Loss | (Thailand) Morakot Sor.Tamarangsri | Lumpinee Stadium | Bangkok, Thailand | Decision | 5 | 3:00 |
| 1988-02-02 | Win | (Thailand) Toto Por Pongsawang | Lumpinee Stadium | Bangkok, Thailand | Decision | 5 | 3:00 |
| 1987-12-29 | Win | (Thailand) Toto Por Pongsawang | Lumpinee Stadium | Bangkok, Thailand | Decision | 5 | 3:00 |
| 1987-12-08 | Loss | (Thailand) Karuhat Sor.Supawan | Lumpinee Stadium | Bangkok, Thailand | Decision | 5 | 3:00 |
| 1987-10-27 | Loss | (Thailand) Saeksan Sitjomthong | Onesongchai, Lumpinee Stadium | Bangkok, Thailand | Decision | 5 | 3:00 |
| 1987-10-02 | Win | (Thailand) Kompayak Singmanee | Lumpinee Stadium | Bangkok, Thailand | Decision | 5 | 3:00 |
| 1987-09-01 | Win | (Thailand) Amnatsak Sor.Sinsawad | Lumpinee Stadium | Bangkok, Thailand | Decision | 5 | 3:00 |
| 1987-07-31 | Loss | (Thailand) Karuhat Sor.Supawan | Lumpinee Stadium | Bangkok, Thailand | Decision | 5 | 3:00 |
| 1987-05-01 | Loss | (Thailand) Haodong Sor.Thasanee | Onesongchai, Lumpinee Stadium | Bangkok, Thailand | Decision | 5 | 3:00 |
| 1987-03-31 | Win | (Thailand) Panphet Muangsurin | Onesongchai, Lumpinee Stadium | Bangkok, Thailand | Decision | 5 | 3:00 |
| 1986-12-10 | Win | (Thailand) Morakot Sor.Thammarangsri | Huamark Stadium Samart Payakaroon vs Juan Meza | Bangkok, Thailand | Decision | 5 | 3:00 |
| 1986-10-14 | Win | (Thailand) Hippy Singmanee | Lumpinee Stadium | Bangkok, Thailand | Decision | 5 | 3:00 |
| 1986-09-12 | Win | (Thailand) Songchainoi Por.SomjitAir | Onesongchai, Lumpinee Stadium | Bangkok, Thailand | Decision | 5 | 3:00 |
| 1986-08-29 | Loss | (Thailand) Khunpol Sor.Wattana | Onesongchai, Lumpinee Stadium | Bangkok, Thailand | Decision | 5 | 3:00 |
| 1986-07-29 | Loss | (Thailand) Patcharin Sripatcharin | Lumpinee Stadium | Bangkok, Thailand | Decision | 5 | 3:00 |
| 1986-04-29 | Draw | (Thailand) Boontiang Singsuangern | Lumpinee Stadium | Bangkok, Thailand | Decision | 5 | 3:00 |
| 1986-03-04 | Win | (Thailand) Mongkolchai Ekamorn | Lumpinee Stadium | Bangkok, Thailand | Decision | 5 | 3:00 |
| 1985-12-06 | Loss | (Thailand) Boonmee Sitchuchon | Lumpinee Stadium | Bangkok, Thailand | Decision | 5 | 3:00 |
| 1985-09-20 | Win | (Thailand) Dokmaipa Por.Pongsawang | Lumpinee Stadium | Bangkok, Thailand | Decision | 5 | 3:00 |
| 1985-07-12 | Win | (Thailand) Saenchai Luksawong | Lumpinee Stadium | Bangkok, Thailand | Decision | 5 | 3:00 |
| 1985-06-04 | Loss | (Thailand) Rengromnoi Davy | Lumpinee Stadium Anniversary Show | Bangkok, Thailand | Decision | 5 | 3:00 |
Legend: Win Loss Draw/No contest Notes
