= Chatchai Paiseetong =

Thai professional Muay Thai fighter (1974–2002)

- Chatchai in the 1990s
- Born: Sanithep Phuprasong; May 5, 1974; Si Racha, Chonburi, Thailand
- Died: February 2, 2002 (aged 28); Bangkok Pattaya Hospital, Pattaya, Thailand; Heart failure
- Native name: สนิทเทพ ภู่ประสงค์
- Other names: Ja-Ae Lookchukkacher; Chatchai Sityodtong (ฉัตรชัย ส.บดินทร์); Chatchai Sit ISS (ฉัตรชัย ศิษย์ ไอเอสเอส)
- Nickname: Samart 2 (มาด 2)
- Height: 170 cm (5 ft 7 in)
- Division: Bantamweight; Super Bantamweight; Featherweight; Super Featherweight
- Style: Muay Thai (Muay Femur)
- Stance: Orthodox
- Team: Sityodtong/Payakaroon
- Trainer: Kiatmala Sitpraedum (father); Yodtong Senanan
- Years active: c. 1983–2002

Other information
- Occupation: Muay Thai fighter

Sanithep Phuprasong (Thai: สนิทเทพ ภู่ประสงค์; May 5, 1974 – February 2, 2002), known professionally as Chatchai Paiseetong (Thai: ฉัตรชัย ไผ่สีทอง), was a Thai professional Muay Thai fighter. He was a two-time Lumpinee Stadium Super Bantamweight Champion as well as the 1993 Sports Authority of Thailand Fighter of the Year.

== Biography and career ==
=== Early career ===
Sanithep Puprasong started his Muay Thai career at 9–10 years old. He initially fought under the ring name of Ja-Ae Lookchukkacher and trained under his father, a Muay Thai fighter by the ring name of Kiatmala Sitpraedum. He would later transfer to the Sityodtong/Payakaroon gym where he would become a teammate of Samart Payakaroon and trained under Kru Yodtong Senanan. He would then adopt the ring name of Chatchai Sityodtong in honor of his new gym, but he would later be more popularly known as Chatchai Paiseetong.

=== Fighting style ===
Chatchai was an orthodox Muay Femur stylist which is the Muay Thai equivalent to the rope-a-dope style from boxing. While Chatchai had a well-rounded skill set, he was specifically renowned for his head kicks resulting in knockdowns against his opponents. He would be praised by Thai audiences as one of the most skilled Muay Femur fighters of the golden era of Muay Thai. He was often compared to his teammate Samart Payakaroon and was labelled "Samart 2" by the Thai media as a result of his skill.

=== Peak of Muay Thai career and later years ===
Chatchai uses a left head kick on Jaroensap Kiatbanchong, July 1993

By 1992, he was fighting near or at bantamweight (118 lbs), his ideal weight class, for the Onesongchai promotion. However, Onesongchai later forced their top bantamweight fighters to move up to junior featherweight (122 lbs) as the bantamweight division was filled with fighters from other promotions. While Chatchai did not belong in the higher weight, he would win the Lumpinee junior featherweight title twice against the elite Wangchannoi Sor.Palangchai and Boonlai Sor.Thanikul. At 19-years-old, he reached the peak of his Muay Thai career in 1993 after he finished the year with a record of 7 wins in 10 bouts including the aforementioned title fights. For this performance he was given the Sports Authority of Thailand Fighter of the Year award, the second most prestigious award in the sport of Muay Thai. His competitive prime was short as he struggled to keep his weight down as well as having too small of a frame for heavier weight classes.

Chatchai would KO Mathee Jadeepitak with his signature head kick at 123 lbs, which also marked the last time in his career that he would fight in or near junior featherweight. Afterward, Chatchai was matched up against another elite Muay Femur fighter Therdkiat Sitthepitak at featherweight (126 lbs), 8 lbs or 2 weight classes above his ideal weight.

As Chatchai began to decline, he began to fight in junior lightweight (130 lbs). He was still able to defeat several yodmuay (elite fighters) during his decline such as but not limited to Lamnamoon Sor.Sumalee, Prabsuek Sitsantad, Den Muangsurin, and drew against Therdkiat in their rematch and beat him again in 1995. He suffered from alcoholism in the late stages of his life.

=== Last fight and death ===
On February 1, 2002, under the ring name of Chatchai Sit ISS, he fought Belarusian fighter Alexei Pekarchyk. After losing by decision he grew disoriented and fainted, thus he was transported to Bangkok Pattaya Hospital where his death from heart failure was pronounced at 1:30 AM the next day. He was 28 years old. He was cremated and his relatives placed his ashes in the Chukkacher Temple in his hometown of Bueng subdistrict of Sriracha in Chonburi province.

== Titles and accomplishments ==
- Lumpinee Stadium
  - 1993 2x Lumpinee Stadium Super Bantamweight (122 lbs) Champion

Awards

- 1993 Lumpinee Stadium Fighter of the Year
- 1993 Sports Authority of Thailand Fighter of the Year

== Fight record ==
Muay Thai Record (Incomplete)
Date	Result	Opponent	Event	Location	Method	Round	Time
2002-02-01	Loss	(Russia) Alexei Pekarchyk		Bangkok, Thailand	Decision	5	3:00
1999-11-05	Win	(Thailand) Buatong Sitputapim	Lumpinee Stadium	Bangkok, Thailand	Decision	5	3:00
1998-03-10	Loss	(Thailand) Rambojiew Por.Thubtim	Lumpinee Stadium	Bangkok, Thailand	Decision	5	3:00
1998-02-03	Win	(Thailand) Sakmongkol Monsaichol	Lumpinee Stadium	Bangkok, Thailand	KO (kicks & punches)	2	
1997-	Win	(Thailand) Jompoplek Sor.Sumalee	Lumpinee Stadium	Bangkok, Thailand	Decision	5	3:00
1997-05-17	Loss	(Thailand) Jompoplek Sor.Sumalee	Mitsubishi Strada Tournament, Lumpinee Stadium	Bangkok, Thailand	Decision	5	3:00
1997-04-05	Win	(Thailand) Den Muangsurin	Mitsubishi Strada Tournament, Lumpinee Stadium	Bangkok, Thailand	Decision	5	3:00
1996-11-26	Loss	(Thailand) Dao-Udon Sor.Suchart	Lumpinee Stadium	Bangkok, Thailand	Decision	5	3:00
1996-08-23	Loss	(Thailand) Lamnamoon Sor.Sumalee	Lumpinee Stadium	Bangkok, Thailand	Decision	5	3:00
For the Lumpinee Stadium Super Featherweight (130 lbs) title.
1996-06-28	Win	(Thailand) Keng Singnakhonkui	Lumpinee Stadium	Bangkok, Thailand	Decision	5	3:00
1996-04-19	Loss	(Thailand) Lamnamoon Sor.Sumalee	Lumpinee Stadium	Bangkok, Thailand	Decision	5	3:00
1996-03-19	Win	(Thailand) Jompoplek Sor. Sumalee	Lumpinee Stadium	Bangkok, Thailand	Decision	5	3:00
1996-02-15	Win	(Thailand) Lamnamoon Sor.Sumalee	Lumpinee Stadium	Bangkok, Thailand	KO (Right Hook)	3	
1995-12-30	Loss	(Thailand) Kaoponglek Luksuratham	Lumpinee Stadium	Bangkok, Thailand	Decision	5	3:00
1995-09-12	Loss	(Thailand) Namkabuan Nongkeepahuyuth	Lumpinee Stadium	Bangkok, Thailand	Decision	5	3:00
1995-	Win	(Thailand) Therdkiat Sitthepitak	Lumpinee Stadium	Bangkok, Thailand	Decision	5	3:00
1995-06-10	Win	(Thailand) Cherry Sor.Wanich	Lumpinee Stadium	Bangkok, Thailand	Decision	5	3:00
1995-05-05	Loss	(Thailand) Lamnamoon Sor.Sumalee	Lumpinee Stadium	Bangkok, Thailand	Decision	5	3:00
1995-03-03	Loss	(Thailand) Samkor Chor.Rathchatasupak	Lumpinee Stadium	Bangkok, Thailand	Decision	5	3:00
1994-12-21	Win	(Thailand) Prabsuek Sitsantad	Rajadamnern Stadium Anniversary	Bangkok, Thailand	Decision	5	3:00
1994-11-29	Draw	(Thailand) Therdkiat Sitthepitak	Lumpinee Stadium	Bangkok, Thailand	Decision	5	3:00
1994-11-15	Win	(Thailand) Hansuk Prasathinpanomrung	Lumpinee Stadium	Bangkok, Thailand	KO (Head Kick)	3	
1994-10-19	Loss	(Thailand) Wanwiset Kaennorasing	Rajadamnern Stadium	Bangkok, Thailand	Decision	5	3:00
1994-09-09	Loss	(Thailand) Mathee Jadeepitak	Lumpinee Stadium	Bangkok, Thailand	Decision	5	3:00
For the Lumpinee Stadium Featherweight (126 lbs) title.
1994-08-09	Loss	(Thailand) Namkabuan Nongkeepahuyuth	Lumpinee Stadium	Bangkok, Thailand	Decision	5	3:00
1994-06-20	Win	(Thailand) Therdkiat Sitthepitak	Rajadamnern Stadium	Bangkok, Thailand	Decision	5	3:00
1994-05-27	Win	(Thailand) Mathee Jadeepitak	Lumpinee Stadium	Bangkok, Thailand	TKO (High kick)	2	
1994-04-29	Loss	(Thailand) Boonlai Sor.Thanikul	Lumpinee Stadium	Bangkok, Thailand	Decision	5	3:00
1994-03-08	Loss	(Thailand) Karuhat Sor.Supawan	Lumpinee Stadium	Bangkok, Thailand	Decision	5	3:00
1994-02-15	Win	(Thailand) Lamnamoon Sor.Sumalee	Lumpinee Stadium	Bangkok, Thailand	KO (Elbow)	3	
1994-01-28	Loss	(Thailand) Kaensak Sor.Ploenjit	Lumpinee Stadium	Bangkok, Thailand	Decision	5	3:00
1993-12-17	Loss	(Thailand) Karuhat Sor.Supawan	Lumpinee Stadium	Bangkok, Thailand	Decision	5	3:00
Loses the Lumpinee Stadium Super Bantamweight (122 lbs) title.
1993-11-30	Win	(Thailand) Wangchannoi Sor.Palangchai	Lumpinee Stadium	Bangkok, Thailand	Decision	5	3:00
Wins the Lumpinee Stadium Super Bantamweight (122 lbs) title.
1993-10-22	Loss	(Thailand) Wangchannoi Sor.Palangchai	Lumpinee Stadium	Bangkok, Thailand	Decision	5	3:00
Loses the Lumpinee Stadium Super Bantamweight (122 lbs) title. For a 900,000 baht side-bet.
1993-09-17	Win	(Thailand) Karuhat Sor.Supawan	Lumpinee Stadium	Bangkok, Thailand	Decision	5	3:00
1993-08-31	Win	(Thailand) Boonlai Sor.Thanikul	Lumpinee Stadium	Bangkok, Thailand	Decision	5	3:00
Wins the Lumpinee Stadium Super Bantamweight (122 lbs) title.
1993-07-09	Win	(Thailand) Jaroensap Kiatbanchong	Lumpinee Stadium	Bangkok, Thailand	KO (Spinning back elbow, punches)	5	
1993-06-08	Win	(Thailand) Chainoi Muangsurin	Lumpinee Stadium	Bangkok, Thailand	KO (High Kick)	5	
1993-05-07	Win	(Thailand) Kruekchai Kiatyongyut	Lumpinee Stadium	Bangkok, Thailand	Decision	5	3:00
1993-03-10	Win	(Thailand) Khanuphet Johnnygym	Lumpinee Stadium	Bangkok, Thailand	Decision	5	3:00
1993-02-26	Loss	(Thailand) Meechok Sor.Ploenchit	Lumpinee Stadium	Bangkok, Thailand	Decision	5	3:00
1993-01-29	Win	(Thailand) Detduang Por.Pongsawang	Lumpinee Stadium	Bangkok, Thailand	Decision	5	3:00
1992-12-29	Win	(Thailand) Detduang Por.Pongsawang	Lumpinee Stadium	Bangkok, Thailand	Decision	5	3:00
1992-10-24	Loss	(Thailand) Kongklai SitKruOd	Lumpinee Stadium	Bangkok, Thailand	KO	2	
1992-05-02	Win	(Thailand) Paruhatlek Sitchunthong	Lumpinee Stadium	Bangkok, Thailand	Decision	5	3:00
1992-04-07	Loss	(Thailand) Lamnamoon Sor.Sumalee	Lumpinee Stadium	Bangkok, Thailand	Decision	5	3:00
1992-02-07	Loss	(Thailand) Toto Por.Pongsawang	Lumpinee Stadium	Bangkok, Thailand	Decision	5	3:00
1991-12-29	Win	(Thailand) Fahpichit Sor.Rachada	Lumpinee Stadium	Bangkok, Thailand	Decision	5	3:00
1991-10-25	Win	(Thailand) Morakot Sor.Tammarangsri	Lumpinee Stadium	Bangkok, Thailand	Decision	5	3:00
1991-09-21	Win	(Thailand) Pichai Wor.Walapon	Lumpinee Stadium	Bangkok, Thailand	KO (Head Kick)	4	
1991-04-30	Loss	(Thailand) Methanoi Maliwan	Lumpinee Stadium	Bangkok, Thailand	Decision	5	3:00
1991-03-05	Win	(Thailand) Samingprai Sor.Rungnakorn	Lumpinee Stadium	Bangkok, Thailand	KO		
1991-02-09	Win	(Thailand) Dejpanom Por.Paoin	Lumpinee Stadium	Bangkok, Thailand	KO (Knee)	2	
1990-	Win	(Thailand) Rungchainoi Singkaset	Lumpinee Stadium	Bangkok, Thailand	Decision	5	3:00
Legend: Win Loss Draw/No contest Notes
