= Singhao Tor.Hintok =

Thai former professional Muay Thai fighter

- Born: Chalermporn Poonchuay; January 16, 1971 (age 55); Khuan Phang, Ron Phibun, Nakhon Si Thammarat, Thailand
- Native name: เฉลิมพร พูนช่วย
- Other names: Moohok Tor.Hintok (หมู่หก ต.หินตก)
- Nickname: Left in Full Bloom(ซ้ายสะบัดช่อ); Boxer of Gratitude (นักชกจอมกตัญญู)
- Style: Muay Thai; Boxing
- Stance: Southpaw
- Team: Tor.Hintok; Dejrath; Sananchai Kiatphetch
- Trainer: Surat Sianglor; Hearn Silathong
- Years active: 1990s

Chalermporn Poonchuay (Thai: เฉลิมพร พูนช่วย; born January 16, 1971), known professionally as Singhao Tor.Hintok (Thai: สิงห์ห้าว ต.หินตก) is a Thai former professional Muay Thai. He never fought for a Lumpinee Stadium or Rajadamnern Stadium title but defeated multiple champions.

== Biography and career ==
Singhao was born on January 16, 1971, to Puan and Boonlap Poonchuay in Khuan Phang, Ron Phibun, Nakhon Si Thammarat, southern region.

He trained in Muay Thai from Tor.Hintok gym based in neighbouring Hin Tok. Later, he moved to be affiliated with Surat Sianglor at the Dejrath gym in Bangkok.

He had fought with many of the renowned Muay Thai kickboxers of the period, such as Thongchai Tor.Silachai, Chartchainoi Chaorai-Oi, Jaroensap Kiatbanchong, Changnoi Sirimongkol, Dokmaifai Tor.Sittichai or Rattanachai Wor.Wolapon.

He was a southpaw stance kickboxer who main technique is strong left kicks as well as powerful left and right punches.

In addition to Muay Thai, he has also competed in amateur boxing tournaments in his regional hometown.

After retiring from being a Muay Thai practitioner, Singhao was ordained as a monk at a Wat Tha Pho temple in the city of Nakhon Si Thammarat.

== Fight record ==
Muay Thai Record
Date	Result	Opponent	Event	Location	Method	Round	Time
1995-05-05	Loss	(Thailand) Tukatathong Por.Pongsawang	Onesongchai, Lumpinee Stadium	Bangkok, Thailand	Decision	5	3:00
1995-04-08	Win	(Thailand) Dokmaifai Tor.Sittichai	MuayThai Naikhanomtom, Lumpinee Stadium	Bangkok, Thailand	Decision	5	3:00
1995-02-21	Loss	(Thailand) Changnoi Sor.Wanich	Fairtex + Onesongchai, Lumpinee Stadium	Bangkok, Thailand	Decision	5	3:00
1994-	Loss	(Thailand) Jaroensap Kiatbanchong		Bangkok, Thailand			
1994-06-28	Loss	(Thailand) Rattanachai Wor.Walapon	Fairtex, Lumpinee Stadium	Bangkok, Thailand	Decision	5	3:00
1994-05-31	Win	(Thailand) Chailek Sitkaruhat	Onesongchai, Lumpinee Stadium	Bangkok, Thailand	Decision	5	3:00
1994-04-22	Loss	(Thailand) Thongchai Tor.Silachai	Fairtex, Lumpinee Stadium	Bangkok, Thailand	Decision	5	3:00
1993-02-13	Win	(Thailand) Charoenwit Kiatbanchong	Onesongchai, Lumpinee Stadium	Bangkok, Thailand	Decision	5	3:00
1992-11-06	Loss	(Thailand) Kruekchai Kaewsamrit	Lumpinee Stadium	Bangkok, Thailand	Decision	5	3:00
1992-09-04	Win	(Thailand) Chartchainoi Chaorai-Oi		Thailand	Decision	5	3:00
1992-07-21	Loss	(Thailand) Tukatathong Por.Pongsawang	Lumpinee Stadium	Bangkok, Thailand	Decision	5	3:00
1992-07-03	Win	(Thailand) Panphet Muangsurin	Lumpinee Stadium	Bangkok, Thailand	KO (Punches)	1	
1992-05-30	Win	(Thailand) Detduang Por.Pongsawang	Lumpinee Stadium	Bangkok, Thailand	Decision	5	3:00
1992-04-03	Loss	(Thailand) Thongchai Tor.Silachai	Fairtex, Lumpinee Stadium	Bangkok, Thailand	Decision	5	3:00
1992-03-14	Loss	(Thailand) Jaroensap Kiatbanchong	Lumpinee Stadium	Bangkok, Thailand	Decision	5	3:00
1992-02-21	Loss	(Thailand) Jaroensap Kiatbanchong	Lumpinee Stadium	Bangkok, Thailand	Decision	5	3:00
1992-01-10	Win	(Thailand) Pairojnoi Sor.Siamchai	Fairtex, Lumpinee Stadium	Bangkok, Thailand	Decision	5	3:00
1991-11-26	Win	(Thailand) Lamnamoon Sor.Sumalee	Onesongchai, Lumpinee Stadium	Bangkok, Thailand	KO	2	
1991-09-21	Draw	(Thailand) Michael Sor.Sukonthip	Onesongchai, Lumpinee Stadium	Bangkok, Thailand	Decision	5	3:00
1991-01-26	Loss	(Thailand) Kompayak Singmanee	Lumpinee Stadium	Bangkok, Thailand	Decision	5	3:00
1990-11-17	Win	(Thailand) Singthongnoi Sor.Siamchai	Yod Muay Siam, Lumpinee Stadium	Bangkok, Thailand	Decision	5	3:00
1990-10-06	Loss	(Thailand) Morakot Sor.Thamrangsi	Lumpinee Stadium	Bangkok, Thailand	Decision	5	3:00
1990-08-14	Win	(Thailand) Dekdam Sitkruchok	Chaomangkon, Lumpinee Stadium	Bangkok, Thailand	KO	3	
1990-05-15	Loss	(Thailand) Kruekchai Sor.Kettalingchan	Onesongchai, Lumpinee Stadium	Bangkok, Thailand	Decision	5	3:00
1990-04-24	Loss	(Thailand) Nungubon Sitlerchai	Onesongchai, Lumpinee Stadium	Bangkok, Thailand	Decision	5	3:00
?-02-10	Win	(Thailand) Orono Por Muang Ubon	Lumpinee Stadium	Bangkok, Thailand	Decision	5	3:00
1989-10-23	Loss	(Thailand) Erawan Sit Chalongkiat	Yodmuay Thaksin	Koh Samui, Thailand	Decision	5	3:00
1989-07-01	Loss	(Thailand) Jaroensap Kiatbanchong	Lumpinee Stadium	Bangkok, Thailand	Decision	5	3:00
1989-03-28	Win	(Thailand) Methanoi Sor Maliwan	Onesongchai + Fairtex, Lumpinee Stadium	Bangkok, Thailand	Decision	5	3:00
Legend: Win Loss Draw/No contest Notes
