= Chatchainoi Chaoraioi =

Thai Muay Thai fighter

- Born: Chuchart Luangphon; August 29, 1965 (age 61); Bua Yai district, Nakhon Ratchasima, Thailand
- Native name: ชูชาติ หลวงพล
- Nickname: Rock Man (มนุษย์หิน)
- Division: Light Flyweight; Flyweight; Super Flyweight
- Style: Muay Thai (Muay Bouk); Boxing
- Stance: Orthodox
- Team: Dejrath Gym
- Trainer: Surat Sianglor; Hearn Silathong
- Years active: c. 1980s–1990s

Professional boxing record
- Total: 1
- Wins: 0
- By knockout: 0
- Losses: 1
- By knockout: 1
- Draws: 0
- No contests: 0

Other information
- Occupation: Muay Thai trainer
- University: Chandrakasem Rajabhat Institute
- Notable relatives: Takrawlek Dejrath (younger brother); Chainoi Worawut (son)
- Boxing record from BoxRec

Chuchart Luangphon (Thai: ชูชาติ หลวงพล; born 1965), known professionally as Chatchainoi Chaoraioi (Thai: ชาติชายน้อย ชาวไร่อ้อย), is a Thai former Muay Thai fighter and professional boxer who competed in the 1990s.

== Biography and career ==
=== Early life ===
Chaorai-Oi was born in 1965 in Nakhon Ratchasima province. He is part of a family of fighters, his father owned a small local Muay Thai gym and his younger brother Takrawlek Dejrath is also a former Muay Thai fighter.

He later trained at Dejrath gym under Surat Sianglor, former trainer of Payao Poontarat, a bronze medalist at the 1976 Summer Olympics and WBC super flyweight world champion.

=== Career ===
Chaorai-Oi fought against many famed contemporary fighters such as Langsuan Panyuthaphum, Lakhin Wassandasit, Samson Isaan, the brothers Pimaran-Pimaranlek Sitaran, Veeraphol Sahaprom, Chainoi Muangsurin, Toto Por Pongsawang, Detduang Por.Pongsawang, Yodkhunpon Sittraiphum or Panomrung Sit Sor Wor Por. At the peak of his career Chaorai-Oi's purse reached 150,000 baht.

Even though he is small in stature Chaorai-Oi was an aggressive fighter who often pounced on his opponents. Three of his favorite techniques were severe low kick to the opponent's ankle, cross punches and elbow strike at close range.

He had an opportunity to try professional boxing in 1995, facing Nungubon Sitlerchai, a fellow Muay Thai practitioner. He lost the bout by knockout.

There are three Muay Thai kickboxers that he admires; Nongkhai Sor.Prapatsorn, Ghairung Lookchaomaesaitong and Saenchai Sor. Kingstar.

=== Retirement ===
After retirement, he became a trainer for Dejrath gym his former stable, he also owns a Muay Thai gym in Phra Phutthabat district, Saraburi province.

His three sons are also fighters. His eldest and second sons, Phetchartchai Chaorai-Oi and Yod Chartchai, are both former Muay Thai kickboxers. His third son Chainoi Worawut is a boxer who currently competes in the super bantamweight division.

== Muay Thai record ==
Muay Thai Record
Date	Result	Opponent	Event	Location	Method	Round	Time
1996-04-04	Loss	(Thailand) Srisatchanalai TaxiMeter	Rajadamnern Stadium	Bangkok, Thailand	Decision	5	3:00
1995-10-04	Draw	(Thailand) Kuekkong Por.Surasak	Rajadamnern Stadium	Bangkok, Thailand	Decision	5	3:00
1995-06-29	Win	(Thailand) Benhur Pinsinchai	Aswindam, Rajadamnern Stadium	Bangkok, Thailand	Decision	5	3:00
1995-	Loss	Thailand Pinsinchai		Bangkok, Thailand	Decision	5	3:00
1995-04-27	Win	(Thailand) Samart2 Luklongtan	Aswindam, Rajadamnern Stadium	Bangkok, Thailand	Decision	5	3:00
1994-09-01	Win	(Thailand) Yod-Awut Sitmak	Aswindam, Rajadamnern Stadium	Bangkok, Thailand	Decision	5	3:00
1994-06-22	Loss	(Thailand) Veeraphol Sahaprom	Rajadamnern Stadium	Bangkok, Thailand	Decision	5	3:00
For the Rajadamnern Stadium 115 lbs title.
1994-04-07	Win	(Thailand) Kasemlek Kiatsiri	Aswindam, Rajadamnern Stadium	Bangkok, Thailand	Decision	5	3:00
1994-02-22	Loss	(Thailand) Sibthit Lukbanyai	Kiatpetch, Lumpinee Stadium	Bangkok, Thailand	Decision	5	3:00
1994-01-27	Draw	(Thailand) Kasemlek Kiatsiri	Rajadamnern Stadium	Bangkok, Thailand	Decision	5	3:00
1994-01-06	Win	(Thailand) Detduang Por.Pongsawang	Aswindam, Rajadamnern Stadium	Bangkok, Thailand	Decision	5	3:00
1993-10-26	Win	(Thailand) Sakpanya Kiatbunkerd	Chatuchok, Lumpinee Stadium	Bangkok, Thailand	Decision	5	3:00
1993-08-10	Loss	(Thailand) Jaoweha Looktapfah	Lumpinee Stadium	Bangkok, Thailand	Decision	5	3:00
1993-08-26	Win	(Thailand) Denchainoi Pranchai		Nakhon Si Thammarat, Thailand	Decision	5	3:00
1993-05-11	Loss	(Thailand) Jomhodlek Rattanachot	Lumpinee Stadium	Bangkok, Thailand	TKO (Left hooks)	2	
1993-04-02	Loss	(Thailand) Veeraphol Sahaprom	Lumpinee Stadium	Bangkok, Thailand	Decision	5	3:00
1993-03-08	Loss	(Thailand) Charoensak Naratrikul	Rajadamnern Stadium	Bangkok, Thailand	Decision	5	3:00
1993-02-12	Win	(Thailand) Darathong Kiatmuangtrang	Lumpinee Stadium	Bangkok, Thailand	Decision	5	3:00
1993-01-13	Win	(Thailand) Arunee Sakyindee	Rajadamnern Stadium	Bangkok, Thailand	Decision	5	3:00
1992-11-24	Win	(Thailand) Darathong Kiatmuangtrang		Thailand	Decision	5	3:00
1992-10-27	Loss	(Thailand) Dejrit Sor.Ploenchit	Lumpinee Stadium	Bangkok, Thailand	Decision	5	3:00
1992-09-22	Loss	(Thailand) Wichan Sitsuchon		Bangkok, Thailand	Decision	5	3:00
1992-09-04	Loss	(Thailand) Singhao Tor.Hintok		Thailand	Decision	5	3:00
1992-07-31	Loss	(Thailand) Toto Por.Pongsawang	Lumpinee Stadium	Bangkok, Thailand	KO (Punches + Low kicks)	2	
1992-07-07	Loss	(Thailand) Pomphet Kiattichatpayak	Lumpinee Stadium	Bangkok, Thailand	Decision	5	3:00
1992-06-02	Loss	(Thailand) Lakhin Wassandasit	Lumpinee Stadium	Bangkok, Thailand	TKO (Doctor stoppage)	4	
1992-05-17	Win	(Thailand) Singdam Or.Ukrit	Lumpinee Stadium	Bangkok, Thailand	Decision	5	3:00
1992-04-07	Loss	(Thailand) Langsuan Panyuthaphum	Lumpinee Stadium	Bangkok, Thailand	KO (Knee to the body)	3	
1992-03-17	Win	(Thailand) Chainoi Muangsurin	Lumpinee Stadium	Bangkok, Thailand	Decision	5	3:00
1992-01-24	Loss	(Thailand) Saenmuangnoi Lukchaopormahesak	Lumpinee Stadium	Bangkok, Thailand	Decision	5	3:00
1991-12-13	Win	(Thailand) Peemai Or.Yutthanakorn	Lumpinee Stadium	Bangkok, Thailand	Decision	5	3:00
1991-10-22	Win	(Thailand) Sakchai Wongwianyai		Bangkok, Thailand	Decision	5	3:00
1991-10-04	Win	(Thailand) Phuluang Kiatnakhonchon		Bangkok, Thailand	KO	2	
1991-08-16	Loss	(Thailand) Wichan Sitsuchon		Bangkok, Thailand	Decision	5	3:00
1991-07-21	Win	(Thailand) Wichan Sitsuchon		Bangkok, Thailand	Decision	5	3:00
1991-06-27	Win	(Thailand) Padet Petchmueangtrat		Thailand	Decision	5	3:00
1991-05-17	Win	(Thailand) Sakchai Wongwianyai	Lumpinee Stadium	Bangkok, Thailand	Decision	5	3:00
1991-04-12	Loss	(Thailand) Dara Thong Kiatmuang Trang		Thailand	Decision	5	3:00
1991-03-09	Win	(Thailand) Pannoi Chuwatana	Samrong Stadium	Samut Prakan, Thailand	KO	2	
1991-01-12	Loss	(Thailand) Robert Kaennorasing	Samrong Stadium - Isuzu Cup, Semi Final	Samut Prakan, Thailand	Decision	5	3:00
1990-12-16	Loss	(Thailand) Yodkhunpon Sittraiphum	Samrong Stadium - Isuzu Cup	Samut Prakan, Thailand	Decision	5	3:00
1990-01-26	Loss	(Thailand) Phanomrung Sit SorPor.		Bangkok, Thailand	KO	3	
1989-05-23	Loss	(Thailand) Pimaranlek Sitaran	Lumpinee Stadium	Bangkok, Thailand	Decision	5	3:00
1989-04-28	Loss	(Thailand) Thanongdej Kiatphayathai	Lumpinee Stadium	Bangkok, Thailand	Decision	5	3:00
1989-02-28	Loss	(Thailand) Chainoi Muangsurin		Bangkok, Thailand	Decision	5	3:00
1988-09-30	Win	(Thailand) Chainoi Muangsurin	Lumpinee Stadium	Bangkok, Thailand	Decision	5	3:00
1988-03-22	Win	(Thailand) Chainoi Muangsurin	Lumpinee Stadium	Bangkok, Thailand	Decision	5	3:00
Legend: Win Loss Draw/No contest Notes
