= Chainoi Muangsurin =

Thai former professional Muay Thai fighter

- Born: Jampa Wilaisin; September 3, 1967 (age 59); Thawat Buri, Roi Et, Thailand
- Native name: จำปา วิไลศิลป์
- Height: 1.62 m (5 ft 4 in)
- Division: Mini Flyweight; Light Flyweight; Flyweight; Super Flyweight
- Style: Muay Thai (Muay Mat)
- Stance: Southpaw
- Team: Muangsurin

Other information
- Occupation: Muay thai fighter (retired)

Jampa Wilaisin (Thai: จำปา วิไลศิลป์; born September 3, 1967), known professionally as Chainoi Muangsurin (Thai: ชายน้อย เมืองสุรินทร์), is a Thai former professional Muay Thai fighter. He is a former Lumpinee Stadium Flyweight Champion who was active during the 1980s and 1990s.

== Career ==
A southpaw, he trained at the Muangsurin gym alongside fighters such as Samransak Muangsurin, Coban Lookchaomaesaitong, Phanphet Muangsurin, and Den Muangsurin.

He fought during the Golden Era of Muay Thai against many notable fighters including Karuhat Sor.Supawan, Pimaranlek Sitaran, Hippy Singmanee, Paruhatlek Sitchunthong, Thongchai Tor.Silachai, Chatchai Paiseetong, Nungubon Sitlerchai, Dokmaipa Por Pongsawang, Jaroensap Kiatbanchong, and Mathee Jadeepitak.

== Titles and honours ==
- Lumpinee Stadium
  - 1990 Lumpinee Stadium Flyweight (112 lbs) Champion

== Muay Thai record ==
Muay Thai Record
Date	Result	Opponent	Event	Location	Method	Round	Time
1994-09-27	Win	(Thailand) Petchsinil Sor.Ubonrat	Lumpinee Stadium	Bangkok, Thailand	KO (Punches)	3	
1994-08-16	Win	(Thailand) Sittichai Petchbangprang	Lumpinee Stadium	Bangkok, Thailand	Decision	5	3:00
1994-04-29	Draw	(Thailand) Chailek SitKaruhat	Lumpinee Stadium	Bangkok, Thailand	Decision	5	3:00
1994-03-22	Loss	(Thailand) Kompayak Singmanee	Lumpinee Stadium	Bangkok, Thailand	Decision	5	3:00
1994-02-21	Win	(Thailand) Pichai Wor.Walapon	Lumpinee Stadium	Bangkok, Thailand	KO	4	
1993-08-06	Loss	(Thailand) Nongnarong Looksamrong	Lumpinee Stadium	Bangkok, Thailand	KO	2	
1993-07-09	Loss	(Thailand) Ratchachai Wor.Walapon	Lumpinee Stadium	Bangkok, Thailand	Decision	5	3:00
1993-06-08	Loss	(Thailand) Chatchai Paiseetong	Lumpinee Stadium	Bangkok, Thailand	KO (Head Kick)	5	
?	Loss	(Thailand) Chaiyai Sit Karuhat	Lumpinee Stadium	Bangkok, Thailand	Decision	5	3:00
1992-12-04	Loss	(Thailand) Kruekchai Kiatyongyut	Lumpinee Stadium	Bangkok, Thailand	Decision	5	3:00
1992-	Loss	(Thailand) Tukatathong Por.Pongsawang	Lumpinee Stadium	Bangkok, Thailand	KO	3	
1992-07-07	Loss	(Thailand) Jaroensap Kiatbanchong	Lumpinee Stadium	Bangkok, Thailand	Decision	5	3:00
1992-05-29	Win	(Thailand) Somingphrai Sor.Rungnakorn	Lumpinee Stadium	Bangkok, Thailand	KO (Punches)	4	
1992-04-24	Loss	(Thailand) Pompetch Kiatchatpayak	Lumpinee Stadium	Bangkok, Thailand	Decision	5	3:00
1992-03-17	Loss	(Thailand) Chartchainoi Chaorai-Oi	Lumpinee Stadium	Bangkok, Thailand	Decision	5	3:00
1991-12-06	Loss	(Thailand) Nungubon Sitlerchai	Lumpinee Stadium	Bangkok, Thailand	Decision	5	3:00
1991-11-05	Loss	(Thailand) Nungubon Sitlerchai	Lumpinee Stadium	Bangkok, Thailand	Decision	5	3:00
1991-10-18	Win	(Thailand) Thongchai Tor.Silachai	Lumpinee Stadium	Bangkok, Thailand	Decision	5	3:00
1991-08-06	Loss	(Thailand) Karuhat Sor.Supawan	Lumpinee Stadium	Bangkok, Thailand	TKO (Doctor stoppage)	2	
1991-05-31	Win	(Thailand) Mathee Jadeepitak	Lumpinee Stadium	Bangkok, Thailand	Decision	5	3:00
1991-05-10	Loss	(Thailand) Dokmaipa Por.Pongsawang	Lumpinee Stadium	Bangkok, Thailand	Decision	5	3:00
1991-	Loss	(Thailand) Thongchai Tor.Silachai	Lumpinee Stadium	Bangkok, Thailand	Decision	5	3:00
1991-02-12	Draw	(Thailand) Mathee Jadeepitak	Lumpinee Stadium	Bangkok, Thailand	Decision	5	3:00
1990-12-18	Win	(Thailand) D-Day Kiatmuangkan	Lumpinee Stadium	Bangkok, Thailand	Decision	5	3:00
1990-11-27	Loss	(Thailand) Duangsompong Por.Pongsawang	Lumpinee Stadium	Bangkok, Thailand	Decision	5	3:00
1990-10-30	Loss	(Thailand) Karuhat Sor.Supawan	Lumpinee Stadium	Bangkok, Thailand	Decision	5	3:00
1990-10-07	Loss	(Thailand) Jaroensap Kiatbanchong		New Zealand	Decision	5	3:00
For the Lumpinee Stadium Flyweight (112 lbs) title.
1990-08-31	Loss	(Thailand) Jaroensap Kiatbanchong	Lumpinee Stadium	Bangkok, Thailand	Decision	5	3:00
Loses the Lumpinee Stadium Flyweight (112 lbs) title.
1990-06-29	Win	(Thailand) Karuhat Sor.Supawan	Lumpinee Stadium	Bangkok, Thailand	KO (Head Kick)	3	
Wins the Lumpinee Stadium Flyweight (112 lbs) title.
1990-06-08	Win	(Thailand) Pongsiri Por.Ruamrudee	Lumpinee Stadium	Bangkok, Thailand	KO (Punches)	3	
1990-04-27	Win	(Thailand) Pongsiri Por.Ruamrudee	Lumpinee Stadium	Bangkok, Thailand	Decision	5	3:00
1990-04-10	Win	(Thailand) Toto Pongsawang	Lumpinee Stadium	Bangkok, Thailand	Decision	5	3:00
1990-03-06	Win	(Thailand) Toto Pongsawang	Lumpinee Stadium	Bangkok, Thailand	Decision	5	3:00
1990-02-10	Win	(Thailand) Paruhatlek Sitchunthong	Lumpinee Stadium	Bangkok, Thailand	Decision	5	3:00
1989-12-18	Loss	(Thailand) Pairojnoi Sor Siamchai	Lumpinee Stadium	Bangkok, Thailand	Decision	5	3:00
1989-11-20	Win	(Thailand) Hippy Singmanee	Onesongchai + Jao Mangkorn Rajadamnern Stadium	Bangkok, Thailand	Decision	5	3:00
1989-09-08	Loss	(Thailand) Hippy Singmanee	Lumpinee Stadium	Bangkok, Thailand	Decision	5	3:00
For the Lumpinee Stadium Light Flyweight (108 lbs) title.
1989-08-08	Loss	(Thailand) Toto Pongsawang	Lumpinee Stadium	Bangkok, Thailand	TKO (Doctor stoppage)	4	
1989-06-06	Win	(Thailand) Toto Pongsawang	Lumpinee Stadium	Bangkok, Thailand	Decision	5	3:00
1989-05-09	Win	(Thailand) Panomrung Sit Sor Wor Por	Lumpinee Stadium	Bangkok, Thailand	Decision	5	3:00
1989-02-28	Win	(Thailand) Chartchainoi Chaorai-Oi	Lumpinee Stadium	Bangkok, Thailand	Decision	5	3:00
1989-01-13	Win	(Thailand) Surin Witthayakhon	Lumpinee Stadium	Bangkok, Thailand	Decision	5	3:00
1988-12-20	Win	(Thailand) Thanongdet Kiatphayathai	Lumpinee Stadium	Bangkok, Thailand	Decision	5	3:00
1988-11-15	Win	(Thailand) Sukkasem Dechchawalit	Lumpinee Stadium	Bangkok, Thailand	Decision	5	3:00
1988-10-14	Win	(Thailand) Pimaranlek Sitaran	Lumpinee Stadium	Bangkok, Thailand	Decision	5	3:00
1988-09-30	Loss	(Thailand) Chartchainoi Chaorai-Oi	Lumpinee Stadium	Bangkok, Thailand	Decision	5	3:00
1988-06-07	Win	(Thailand) Rungroj Singlanthong	Lumpinee Stadium	Bangkok, Thailand	Decision	5	3:00
1988-03-22	Loss	(Thailand) Chartchainoi Chaorai-Oi	Lumpinee Stadium	Bangkok, Thailand	Decision	5	3:00
1988-01-22	Loss	(Thailand) Pongsiri Por.Ruamrudee	Lumpinee Stadium	Bangkok, Thailand	Decision	5	3:00
Legend: Win Loss Draw/No contest Notes
