= Sontaya Wongprates =

Thai Muay Thai fighter and boxer (born 1975)

- Born: Sontaya Wongprates; 30 November 1975 (age 50); Thailand
- Other names: Sonthaya Sor.Ploenchit (สนธยา ส.เพลินจิตร); Chotipat Wongprasert (โชติพัฒ วงษ์ประเทศ)
- Nickname: Top Boxing Angel (จอมมวยเทวดา)
- Height: 1.70 m (5 ft 7 in)
- Division: Bantamweight; Super Bantamweight
- Style: Muay Thai (Muay Femur)
- Stance: Southpaw
- Team: Sor Ploenchit (Muay Thai)

Professional boxing record
- Total: 3
- Wins: 2
- By knockout: 1
- Losses: 1
- By knockout: 1

Sontaya Wongprates (Thai: สนธยา วงษ์ประเทศ), known professionally as Meechok Sor. Ploenchit (Thai: มีโชค ส.เพลินจิตร), is a Thai former professional Muay Thai fighter and amateur boxer. He is a former Lumpinee Stadium Super Bantamweight Champion who was famous during the 1990s. He also competed in the men's boxing bantamweight event at the 2000 Summer Olympics.

== Muay Thai career ==
He trained at the Sor.Ploenchit gym alongside fighters such as Kaensak Sor.Ploenjit, Manasak Sor Ploenchit, and Saen Sor Ploenchit.

He fought during the Golden Era of Muay Thai against many notable fighters including Karuhat Sor.Supawan, Silapathai Jockygym, Thongchai Tor.Silachai, Chatchai Paiseetong, Nungubon Sitlerchai, Hansuk Prasathinpanomrung, Sak Kaoponlek, Yokthai Sithoar, and Rotnarong Daopadriew.

== Titles and honours ==
=== Muay Thai ===
- Lumpinee Stadium
  - 1994 Lumpinee Stadium Super Bantamweight (122 lbs) Champion

=== Boxing ===
- Asian Amateur Boxing Championships
  - 1997 Asian Amateur Boxing Championships Gold Medalist at Bantamweight (54 kg)
  - 1999 Asian Amateur Boxing Championships Bronze Medalist at Bantamweight (54 kg)
  - 2002 Asian Amateur Boxing Championships Silver Medalist at Bantamweight (54 kg)
- SEA Games
  - 2001 SEA Games Gold Medalist at Bantamweight (54 kg)

== Professional boxing record ==
3 fights	2 wins	1 loss
By knockout	1	1
By decision	1	0

No.	Result	Record	Opponent	Type	Round, time	Date	Location	Notes
3	Loss	2–1	Jun Paderna	KO	3 (12)	22 Sep 2006	San Andres Gym, District of Malate, Manila, Philippines	for the PABA Super Featherweight title
2	Win	2–0	Rizal	KO	3 (10)	13 Apr 2006	Wat Suratrangsan, Pathum Thani, Thailand	
1	Win	1–0	Shinya Kiuchi	UD	10	10 Feb 2006	Ubon Ratchathani, Thailand	

== Muay Thai record ==
Muay Thai Record (Incomplete)
Date	Result	Opponent	Event	Location	Method	Round	Time
1995-03-24	Loss	(Thailand) Karuhat Sor.Supawan	Lumpinee Stadium	Bangkok, Thailand	KO (Elbow)	4	
Loses the Lumpinee Stadium Super Bantamweight (122 lbs) title.
1994-10-28	Win	(Thailand) Hansuk Prasathinpanomrung	Lumpinee Stadium	Bangkok, Thailand	Decision (Unanimous)	5	3:00
Wins the Lumpinee Stadium Super Bantamweight (122 lbs) title.
1994-07-19	Win	(Thailand) Silapathai Jockygym	Lumpinee Stadium	Bangkok, Thailand	Decision	5	3:00
1994-05-31	Win	(Thailand) Nungubon Sitlerchai	Lumpinee Stadium	Bangkok, Thailand	Decision	5	3:00
1994-03-	Win	(Thailand) Kaoponglek Luksuratham	Lumpinee Stadium	Bangkok, Thailand	Decision	5	3:00
1994-01-28	Win	(Thailand) Yokthai Sithoar	Lumpinee Stadium	Bangkok, Thailand	Decision	5	3:00
1994-01-07	Win	(Thailand) Thongchai Tor.Silachai	Lumpinee Stadium	Bangkok, Thailand	Decision	5	3:00
1993-05-28	Loss	(Thailand) Hansuk Prasathinpanomrung	Lumpinee Stadium	Bangkok, Thailand	KO (Punches)	2	
1993-02-26	Win	(Thailand) Chatchai Paiseetong	Lumpinee Stadium	Bangkok, Thailand	Decision	5	3:00
1992-07-24	Win	(Thailand) Dokbea Por.Pongsawang	Lumpinee Stadium	Bangkok, Thailand	Decision	5	3:00
1992-05-15	Loss	(Thailand) Rotnarong Daopadriew	Lumpinee Stadium	Bangkok, Thailand	Decision	5	3:00
Legend: Win Loss Draw/No contest Notes
