= Karuhat Sor.Supawan =

Thai former professional Muay Thai fighter

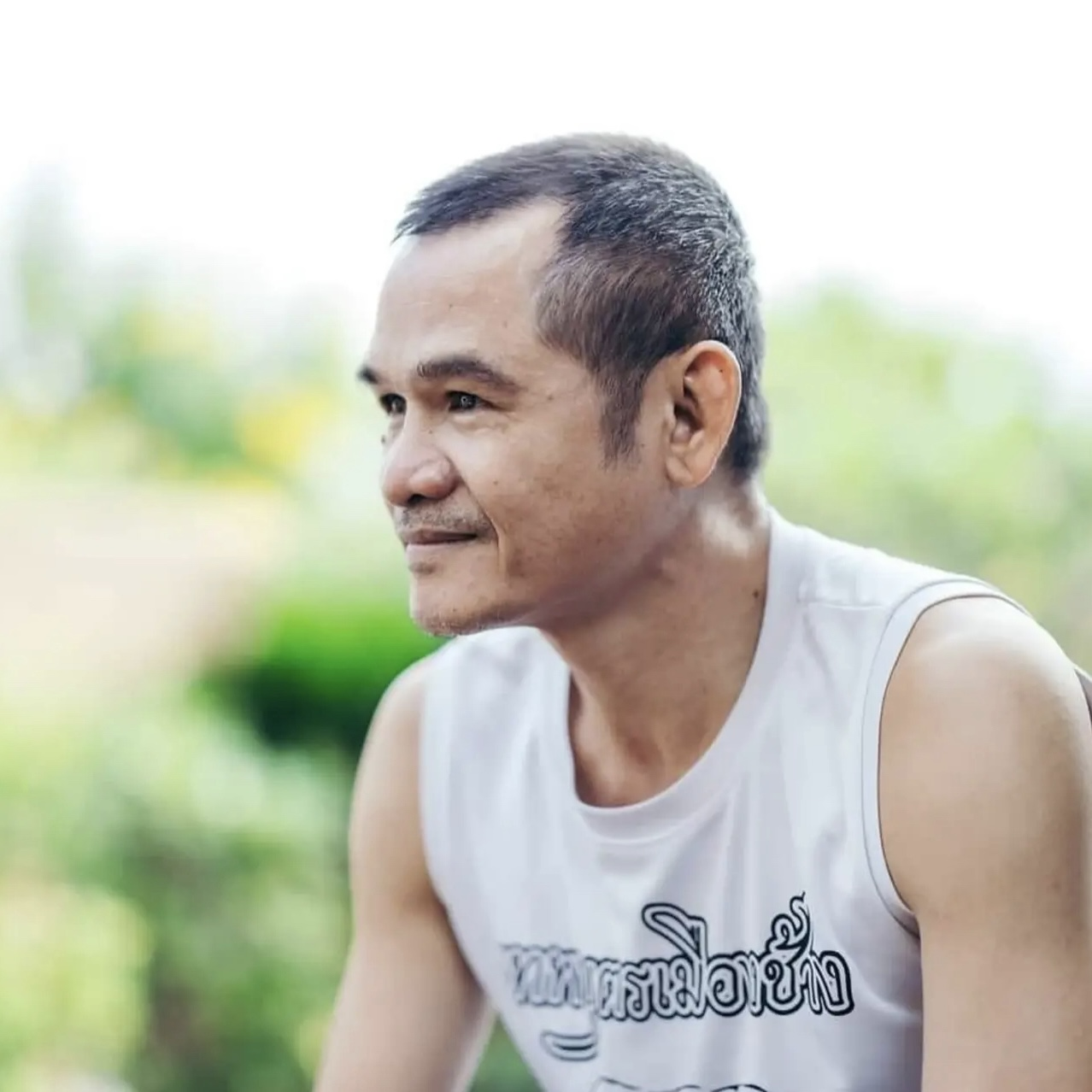
- Karuhat in 2021
- Born: Suvit Yoochumpon (สุวิทย์ อยู่ชุมพล); May 22, 1968 (age 58); Phon, Khon Kaen, Thailand
- Native name: ชยกร อยู่ชุมพล
- Other names: Siannoi Sitkru-O Kongnachai; Siannoi Sor.Ponsaming
- Nickname: Top Master (ยอดเซียน); Master above Masters (เชียนเหนือเซียน); Top Boxing Genius (ยอดมวยอัจฉริยะ); Top Elite Boxer (ยอดมวยเอก)
- Height: 161 cm (5 ft 3 in)
- Division: Mini Flyweight; Light Flyweight; Flyweight; Super Flyweight; Bantamweight; Super Bantamweight
- Style: Muay Thai (Muay Femur)
- Stance: Southpaw
- Team: Sor.Supawan (Sor.Kanokrat)
- Trainer: Kru-O Kongachai (Sitkru-O Kongachai gym); Choi Malithong (Sor.Supawan gym)
- Years active: c. 1981–1995, 1999–2002

Kickboxing record
- Total: 198
- Wins: 165
- By knockout: 20
- Losses: 30
- Draws: 3

Other information
- Occupation: Muay Thai trainer
- Spouse: Joy Pakamas (divorced)
- Children: 1
- Notable students: Chaiyai Sitkaruhat; Chailek Sitkaruhat

Chayakorn Yoochumpon (Thai: ชยกร อยู่ชุมพล, born Suvit Yoochumpon, Thai: สุวิทย์ อยู่ชุมพล; May 22, 1968), known professionally as Karuhat Sor.Supawan (Thai: คฤหาสน์ ส.สุภาวรรณ), is a Thai former professional Muay Thai fighter. He is a former four-time Lumpinee Stadium champion across two divisions who was famous during the 1980s and 1990s. Nicknamed the "Top Master", he is often regarded as one of the greatest and most talented fighters in the history of Muay Thai.

== Life and career ==
=== Early life and introduction to Muay Thai ===
Suvit Yoochumpon was born on May 22, 1968 in Phon, Khon Kaen, Thailand. When he was around the age of 16, while playing a game of football, his friends encouraged him to participate in a nearby Muay Thai match as a fighter needed an opponent his size. Remarkably, despite having no training, he won the fight. Afterwards he'd be offered other fights and would be encouraged by his father to continue.

He had his first fights under the ring name of Siannoi Sitkru-O Kongnachai or Siannoi Sor.Ponsaming. At this time he was a Muay Khao and Muay Femur hybrid which meant that he used a forward fighting, endurance knee style and an artful, defense-oriented style. He eventually stopped practicing the Muay Khao fighting style since its exhausting nature caused him to vomit during fights. Karuhat, which translates to "castle" or "fortress", was the name given to him by his father. He'd fight in about 20 matches in Khon Kaen before moving to Bangkok.

At 17 years old, Karuhat moved to Bangkok to begin training under Choi Malithong in the Sor.Supawan/Sor.Kanokrat gym, owned by Mrs. Suwimon Pinsathienket, under the name of Karuhat Sor.Supawan. He started fighting so frequently that he could not visiting his home at all. On top of being the youngest fighter in the camp when he first joined, he was also tasked with doing chores in the gym. Karuhat would become popular after a successful run in the suburban Bangkok stadiums at 100 lbs/45.36 kg and later attracted further attention of the Thai audiences by beating Nuengthoranee Petchyindee. He would later change his legal name to Chayakorn Yoochumpon.

=== Rise to stardom ===
Karuhat made his Lumpinee Stadium debut in 1986 with a rematch against Nuengthoranee Petchyindee but lost by a close decision. After winning ten of his next twelve matches, including over elite fighters such as Toto Pongsawang, Panomrunglek Chor.Sawat, and Pairojnoi Sor Siamchai, he'd be given the opportunity to challenge for Hippy Singmanee's Lumpinee Mini Flyweight title in 1987. Both showcased their immense technical skill and lighting speed but Karuhat lost by a close decision. After winning seven of next eight matches, including over elite fighters such as Kaensak Sor.Ploenjit and Pairojnoi Sor Siamchai, he'd be given another opportunity to challenge Hippy Singmanee for the vacant Lumpinee Light Flyweight title in 1988. They fought spectacularly once again but Karuhat lost by decision. Nevertheless, Karuhat's fame continued to grow and his talent prompted the Thai media to nickname him The Top Master (ยอดเซียน / Yodsian) among an array of other names referencing his skills. By this point he was already picked up by the Onesongchai Promotion which was considered the best of his era. While the Sor.Supawan gym also housed other reputable fighters, Karuhat would become its most famous representative.

Karuhat's cornerwoman and boss Mrs. Suwimon Pinsathienket was often shooed away from his corner during fights as women were heavily discouraged by superstition from touching the ring, but she would get on top of it anyway in order to give him advice between rounds. She would corner for him during the most significant wins in his career, often pounding the ring as she told him what to do.

His most preferred techniques were low kicks and elbow strikes. Karuhat was proficient in fighting in both orthodox and southpaw so he'd often switch stances to create new openings and confuse his opponents.

=== Competitive peak in Muay Thai ===
Undeterred after losing his two title opportunities, Karuhat would defeat elite fighters such as Hippy Singmanee, Kaensak Sor.Ploenjit, Veeraphol Sahaprom, Oley Kiatoneway, and Paruhatlek Sitchunthong. He'd earn his third title opportunity against Pairojnoi Sor Siamchai, an elite Muay Khao fighter who was the victor of the record-breaking "Fight of the Century" held just months earlier, for the vacant Lumpinee Flyweight title in 1990. Karuhat would use clinch and knee defense and counters to nullify and outscore Pairojnoi in the latter half of the fight. Karuhat won the bout and was awarded his first Lumpinee title. Decades later Karuhat stated that this victory was his favorite memory from his Muay Thai career.

Karuhat would also be the trainer of the twin fighters Chaiyai and Chailek Sitkaruhat. The latter half of their ring names "Sitkaruhat" translates to "student of Karuhat." The twins would both go on to be elite Muay Femur themselves with Chaiyai earning a Lumpinee junior bantamweight belt. Karuhat was matched up against the Dutch Mikael Lieuwfat for the World Heritage Muay Thai event in 1990. Karuhat won the fight while being unusually aggressive, possibly pressured by the fact that the fight was being broadcast around the world.

Around this time, Karuhat was also fighting at Bantamweight (118 lbs/53.52 kg) which was above his ideal weight class. The Onesongchai Promotion would force their top Bantamweight fighters including Karuhat to move up to Super Bantamweight (122 lbs/55.34 kg) where he was able to fight Samkor Kiatmontep, Hansuk Prasathinpanomrung, and others. Despite fighting far above his ideal weight, Karuhat was still reliably winning against the most significant Super Bantamweight fighters such as Jaroensap Kiatbanchong, going so far as to win the Lumpinee Super Bantamweight title twice.

His 4-fight rivalry against Kaensak Sor.Ploenchit were considered the greatest fights in his career. In their third fight where he knocked down Kaensak with left cross, Karuhat received a purse of 240,000 baht, making him one of the few fighters who were paid above the 200,000 baht threshold. In their 4th fight Karuhat would give a difficult defensive performance against him, shutting down Kaensak's trademark counter-kicking style and consistently manipulating his balance. Karuhat also gave excellent defensive performances against other elite fighters who excelled at pressure fighting such as Nongnarong Looksamrong or the KO artist Veeraphol Sahaprom, controlling their aggression and maintaining his distance well. Nungubon Sitlerchai, a Muay Femur fighter who knocked out both Samkor Kiatmontep and Wangchannoi Sor.Palangchai, singled out Karuhat as the most difficult opponent in his career; in the 3 bouts between them Nungubon was unable to win once.

Although he belonged 2 weight classes below Super Bantamweight, Karuhat is considered by numerous Muay Thai practitioners as the greatest Super Bantamweight fighter of the 1990s as well as one of the most skilled fighters in the sport's history. The Thai audiences referred to him by several nicknames such as The Fabulous Fighter, Aysian (The Talented), Yodmuay Atchariya (The Muay Genius), and Yodsian (The Top Master).

=== Decline and later years ===
Karuhat would no longer be in his prime in 1995, the final year of the Bangkok portion of his Muay Thai career. While he took fewer fights in that year as a result, he was still able to secure the Lumpinee Super Bantamweight belt by elbow KO and beat Dokmaipa Por.Pongsawang as well as Silapathai Jockygym. After he took a hiatus for several years, Karuhat began fighting again despite not training seriously, resulting in him getting fewer wins and a KO loss against Alexei Pekarchyk.

In the early 2000s, Karuhat opened the Sitkaruhat Muay Thai gym in Bangkok on top of being a trainer in various gyms in Thailand and abroad. He married Joy Pakamas, the daughter of his former boss Suwimon Pinsathienket. The couple had one son and later divorced.

Saenchai was nicknamed "Little Karuhat" when he began fighting in the Thai circuit and Prajanchai P.K.Saenchai has been compared to Karuhat due to their short stature as well as due to their combinations of low kicks, elbow strikes, and punches.

== Titles and honours ==
- Lumpinee Stadium
  - 1990 Lumpinee Stadium Flyweight (112 lbs) Champion
    - One successful title defense
  - 1991 International Lumpinee Stadium Flyweight (112 lbs) Champion
  - 1993 Lumpinee Stadium Super Bantamweight (122 lbs) Champion
    - Two successful title defenses
  - 1995 Lumpinee Stadium Super Bantamweight (122 lbs) Champion

== Fight record ==
Muay Thai Record
165 Wins (20 KO's), 30 Losses
Date	Result	Opponent	Event	Location	Method	Round	Time
2002-02-02	Loss	(France) Totof	Back To The Future I	Aubervilliers, France	Decision	5	3:00
2000-07-29	Loss	(Russia) Alexei Pekarchyk		Novosibirsk, Russia	KO (Left Hook)	2	
For the IKF Intercontinental Muay Thai title.
1999-03-22	Draw	(Japan) Katsuya Kusumoto	NJKF, Korakuen Hall	Tokyo, Japan	Decision (Majority)	5	3:00
1995-09-20	Win	(Thailand) Silapathai Jockygym	Wanmuaythai, Rajadamnern Stadium	Bangkok, Thailand	Decision (Unanimous)	5	3:00
1995-08-25	Win	(Thailand) Dokmaipa Por.Pongsawang	Onesongchai, Lumpinee Stadium	Bangkok, Thailand	Decision (Unanimous)	5	3:00
1995-03-24	Win	(Thailand) Meechok Sor.Ploenchit	Fairtex + Onesongchai, Lumpinee Stadium	Bangkok, Thailand	KO (Elbow & punches)	4	
Wins the Lumpinee Stadium Super Bantamweight (122 lbs) title.
1994-12-09	Win	(Thailand) Nongnarong Luksamrong	Onesongchai, Lumpinee Stadium	Bangkok, Thailand	Decision (Unanimous)	5	3:00
1994-10-24	Loss	(Thailand) Samkor Kiatmontep	Kiatsingnoi, Rajadamnern Stadium	Bangkok, Thailand	Decision (Unanimous)	5	3:00
1994-08-22	Win	(Thailand) Kaensak Sor.Ploenjit	Kiatsingnoi, Rajadamnern Stadium	Bangkok, Thailand	Decision (Unanimous)	5	3:00
1994-08-02	Win	(Thailand) Saengmorakot Sor.Ploenchit	Fairtex, Rajadamnern Stadium	Bangkok, Thailand	Decision (Unanimous)	5	3:00
1994-06-06	Loss	(Thailand) Silapathai Jockygym	Phetthongkham, Rajadamnern Stadium	Bangkok, Thailand	Decision (Unanimous)	5	3:00
1994-04-29	Loss	(Thailand) Wangchannoi Sor.Palangchai	Onesongchai, Lumpinee Stadium	Bangkok, Thailand	Decision (Unanimous)	5	3:00
Loses the Lumpinee Stadium Super Bantamweight (122 lbs) title.
1994-03-08	Win	(Thailand) Chatchai Paiseetong	Onesongchai, Lumpinee Stadium	Bangkok, Thailand	Decision (Unanimous)	5	3:00
Defends the Lumpinee Stadium Super Bantamweight (122 lbs) title.
1994-02-13	Win	(Thailand) Boonlai Sor.Thanikul	Chachoengsao Provincial Hall	Chachoengsao, Thailand	Decision (Split)	5	3:00
Defends the Lumpinee Stadium Super Bantamweight (122 lbs) title.
1994-01-07	Loss	(Thailand) Wangchannoi Sor.Palangchai	Onesongchai, Lumpinee Stadium	Bangkok, Thailand	Decision (Unanimous)	5	3:00
1993-12-17	Win	(Thailand) Chatchai Paiseetong	Onesongchai, Lumpinee Stadium	Bangkok, Thailand	Decision (Unanimous)	5	3:00
Wins the Lumpinee Stadium Super Bantamweight (122 lbs) title.
1993-11-29	Win	(Thailand) Hansuk Prasathinpanomrung	Kiatsingnoi, Rajadamnern Stadium	Bangkok, Thailand	Decision (Unanimous)	5	3:00
1993-09-17	Loss	(Thailand) Chatchai Paiseetong	Onesongchai, Lumpinee Stadium	Bangkok, Thailand	Decision (Unanimous)	5	3:00
1993-08-31	Win	(Thailand) Lamnamoon Sor.Sumalee	Onesongchai, Lumpinee Stadium	Bangkok, Thailand	Decision (Unanimous)	5	3:00
1993-07-30	Win	(Thailand) Mathee Jadeepitak	Fairtex + Onesongchai, Lumpinee Stadium	Bangkok, Thailand	Decision (Unanimous)	5	3:00
1993-06-25	Win	(Thailand) Nungubon Sitlerchai	Onesongchai, Lumpinee Stadium	Bangkok, Thailand	Decision (Unanimous)	5	3:00
1993-05-07	Loss	(Thailand) Boonlai Sor.Thanikul	Onesongchai, Lumpinee Stadium	Bangkok, Thailand	Decision (Unanimous)	5	3:00
1993-04-06	Win	(Thailand) Kaensak Sor.Ploenjit	Onesongchai, Lumpinee Stadium	Bangkok, Thailand	Decision (Unanimous)	5	3:00
1993-03-16	Win	(Thailand) Nungubon Sitlerchai	Lumpinee Stadium	Bangkok, Thailand	Decision (Unanimous)	5	3:00
1993-02-26	Win	(Thailand) Jompoplek Sor.Sumalee	Onesongchai, Lumpinee Stadium	Bangkok, Thailand	Decision (Unanimous)	5	3:00
1993-01-19	Loss	(Thailand) Lamnamoon Sor.Sumalee	Lumpinee Stadium	Bangkok, Thailand	Decision	5	3:00
1992-12-29	Win	(Thailand) Kruekchai Kiatyongyut	Onesongchai, Lumpinee Stadium	Bangkok, Thailand	TKO (Doctor stoppage)	2	
1992-07-27	NC	(Thailand) Nungubon Sitlerchai	Lumpinee Stadium	Bangkok, Thailand	Dismissal	5	
Karuhat was dismissed by the referee for not fighting up to his abilities.
1992-06-30	Win	(Thailand) Michael Sor.Sukhontip	Onesongchai, Lumpinee Stadium	Bangkok, Thailand	Decision (Unanimous)	5	3:00
1992-04-07	Loss	(Thailand) Duangsompong Por.Pongsawang	Onesongchai, Lumpinee Stadium	Bangkok, Thailand	Decision (Unanimous)	5	3:00
1992-03-10	Loss	(Thailand) Wangchannoi Sor.Palangchai	Onesongchai, Lumpinee Stadium	Bangkok, Thailand	Decision (Unanimous)	5	3:00
1992-02-07	Win	(Thailand) Mathee Jadeepitak	Onesongchai, Lumpinee Stadium	Bangkok, Thailand	Decision (Unanimous)	5	3:00
1991-12-27	Win	(Thailand) Duangsompong Por.Pongsawang	Lumpinee Stadium	Bangkok, Thailand	KO	3	
1991-11-26	Loss	(Thailand) Langsuan Panyuthaphum	Onesongchai, Lumpinee Stadium	Bangkok, Thailand	Decision (Unanimous)	5	3:00
1991-11-04	Win	(Thailand) Jaroensap Kiatbanchong	Onesongchai	New Zealand	Decision (Unanimous)	5	3:00
Wins the International Lumpinee Stadium Flyweight (112 lbs) title.
1991-10-18	Win	(Thailand) Nungubon Sitlerchai	Onesongchai, Lumpinee Stadium	Bangkok, Thailand	Decision (Unanimous)	5	3:00
1991-09-17	Win	(Thailand) Tukatathong Por.Pongsawang	Onesongchai, Lumpinee Stadium	Bangkok, Thailand	Decision (Unanimous)	5	3:00
1991-08-06	Win	(Thailand) Chainoi Muangsurin	Lumpinee Stadium	Bangkok, Thailand	TKO (Doctor stoppage)	2	
1991-06-24	Loss	(Thailand) Veeraphol Sahaprom	Daorungchucharoen, Rajadamnern Stadium	Bangkok, Thailand	Decision (Unanimous)	5	3:00
1991-05-17	Win	(Thailand) Panomrung Sit Sor.Wor.Por.	Thahansuea, Lumpinee Stadium	Bangkok, Thailand	Decision (Unanimous)	5	3:00
1991-04-20	Win	(Thailand) D-Day Kiatmuangkan	Onesongchai	New Zealand	Decision	5	3:00
1991-03-29	Win	(Thailand) Mathee Jadeepitak	Onesongchai, Lumpinee Stadium	Bangkok, Thailand	Decision (Unanimous)	5	3:00
1991-03-04	Win	(Thailand) Duangsompong Por.Pongsawong	Lumpinee Stadium	Bangkok, Thailand	KO (Right elbow)	3	2:00
1991-02-12	Loss	(Thailand) Langsuan Panyuthaphum	Onesongchai, Lumpinee Stadium	Bangkok, Thailand	Decision (Unanimous)	5	3:00
1991-01-25	Loss	(Thailand) Dokmaipa Por.Pongsawang	Onesongchai, Lumpinee Stadium	Bangkok, Thailand	Decision (Unanimous)	5	3:00
1991-01-04	Win	(Thailand) Detduang Por.Pongsawang	Onesongchai, Lumpinee Stadium	Bangkok, Thailand	TKO (Doctor stoppage)	2	
1990-11-27	Loss	(Thailand) Boonlai Sor.Thanikul	Onesongchai, Lumpinee Stadium	Bangkok, Thailand	Decision (Unanimous)	5	3:00
1990-10-30	Win	(Thailand) Chainoi Muangsurin	Onesongchai, Lumpinee Stadium	Bangkok, Thailand	Decision (Unanimous)	5	3:00
1990-10-07	Loss	(Thailand) Oley Kiatoneway	Onesongchai	New Zealand	Decision (Unanimous)	5	3:00
For the International Lumpinee Stadium Super Flyweight (115 lbs) title.
1990-09-11	Win	(Thailand) Rainbow Sor.Prantalay	Onesongchai, Lumpinee Stadium	Bangkok, Thailand	Decision (Unanimous)	5	3:00
1990-08-15	Win	(Thailand) Samernoi Tor.Boonlert	IBF World Championship, Lumpinee Stadium	Bangkok, Thailand	Decision (Unanimous)	5	3:00
1990-06-29	Loss	(Thailand) Chainoi Muangsurin	Onesongchai, Lumpinee Stadium	Bangkok, Thailand	KO (Left high kick)	3	
Loses the Lumpinee Stadium Flyweight (112 lbs) title.
1990-05-15	Loss	(Thailand) Namkabuan Nongkeepahuyuth	Onesongchai, Lumpinee Stadium	Bangkok, Thailand	Decision (Unanimous)	5	3:00
1990-04-27	Win	(Netherlands) Maikel Lieuwfat	Onesongchai, Lumpinee Stadium	Bangkok, Thailand	Decision (Unanimous)	5	3:00
1990-04-10	Win	(Thailand) Pairojnoi Sor.Siamchai	Yodmuaylok, Lumpinee Stadium	Bangkok, Thailand	Decision (Unanimous)	5	3:00
Wins the vacant Lumpinee Stadium Flyweight (112 lbs) title.
1990-03-13	Loss	(Thailand) Panphet Muangsurin	Chaomangkon, Lumpinee Stadium	Bangkok, Thailand	Decision (Unanimous)	5	3:00
1990-01-19	Loss	(Thailand) Namkabuan Nongkeepahuyuth	Yodmuaylok, Lumpinee Stadium	Bangkok, Thailand	KO (Low kicks)	2	
1989-11-28	Win	(Thailand) Oley Kiateonaway	Onesongchai, Lumpinee Stadium	Bangkok, Thailand	Decision (Unanimous)	5	3:00
1989-11-06	Win	(Thailand) Santos Devy	Daorungchucharoen, Rajadamnern Stadium	Bangkok, Thailand	Decision (Unanimous)	5	3:00
1989-10-20	Win	(Thailand) Thanooin Chor.Chuchart	Onesongchai, Lumpinee Stadium	Bangkok, Thailand	Decision (Unanimous)	5	3:00
1989-10-06	Win	(Thailand) Veeraphol Sahaprom	Yodmuaylok, Lumpinee Stadium	Bangkok, Thailand	Decision (Unanimous)	5	3:00
1989-08-29	Loss	(Thailand) Boonlai Sor.Thanikul	Onesongchai, Lumpinee Stadium	Bangkok, Thailand	Decision (Unanimous)	5	3:00
1989-08-15	Loss	(Thailand) Panphet Muangsurin	Mahakuson 12 Singharachini, Lumpinee Stadium	Bangkok, Thailand	Decision	5	3:00
1989-07-25	Loss	(Thailand) Kaensak Sor.Ploenjit	Onesongchai, Lumpinee Stadium	Bangkok, Thailand	Decision (Unanimous)	5	3:00
1989-05-30	Win	(Thailand) Pongsiri Por.Ruamrudee	Onesongchai, Lumpinee Stadium	Bangkok, Thailand	Decision (Unanimous)	5	3:00
1989-04-21	Win	(Thailand) Yodpetch Sor.Jitpattana	Petchyindee, Lumpinee Stadium	Bangkok, Thailand	Decision (Unanimous)	5	3:00
1989-03-28	Loss	(Thailand) Langsuan Panyuthaphum	Fairtex + Onesongchai, Lumpinee Stadium	Bangkok, Thailand	Decision (Unanimous)	5	3:00
1989-01-31	Win	(Thailand) Hippy Singmanee	Onesongchai, Lumpinee Stadium	Bangkok, Thailand	Decision (Unanimous)	5	3:00
1989-01-06	Draw	(Thailand) Langsuan Panyuthaphum	Onesongchai, Lumpinee Stadium	Bangkok, Thailand	Decision (Unanimous)	5	3:00
1988-11-25	Win	(Thailand) Veeraphol Sahaprom	Onesongchai, Lumpinee Stadium	Bangkok, Thailand	Decision (Unanimous)	5	3:00
1988-10-28	Win	(Thailand) Paruhatlek Sitchunthong	Fairtex + Onesongchai, Lumpinee Stadium	Bangkok, Thailand	Decision (Unanimous)	5	3:00
1988-10-11	Win	(Thailand) Saekson Sitjomthong	Onesongchai, Lumpinee Stadium	Bangkok, Thailand	Decision (Unanimous)	5	3:00
1988-08-30	Loss	(Thailand) Hippy Singmanee	Onesongchai, Lumpinee Stadium	Bangkok, Thailand	Decision (Unanimous)	5	3:00
For the vacant Lumpinee Stadium Light Flyweight (108 lbs) title.
1988-07-08	Win	(Thailand) Seesot Sor.Ritthichai	Onesongchai Lumpinee Stadium	Bangkok, Thailand	Decision (Unanimous)	5	3:00
1988-06-24	Loss	(Thailand) Hippy Singmanee	Onesongchai, Lumpinee Stadium	Bangkok, Thailand	Decision (Unanimous)	5	3:00
1988-05-31	Win	(Thailand) Panphet Muangsurin	Lumpinee Stadium	Bangkok, Thailand	Decision	5	3:00
1988-05-03	Win	(Thailand) Pairojnoi Sor.Siamchai	Lumpinee Stadium	Bangkok, Thailand	Decision	5	3:00
1988-03-15	Win	(Thailand) Kaensak Sor.Ploenjit	Lumpinee Stadium	Bangkok, Thailand	Decision	5	3:00
1988-02-02	Win	(Thailand) Morakot Sor.Tamarangsri	Lumpinee Stadium	Bangkok, Thailand	Decision	5	3:00
1987-12-08	Win	(Thailand) Pairojnoi Sor.Siamchai	Lumpinee Stadium	Bangkok, Thailand	Decision	5	3:00
1987-10-27	Win	(Thailand) Panphet Muangsurin	Onesongchai, Lumpinee Stadium	Bangkok, Thailand	Decision	5	3:00
1987-09-01	Win	(Thailand) Toto Por.Pongsawang	Onesongchai, Lumpinee Stadium	Bangkok, Thailand	Decision	5	3:00
1987-07-31	Win	(Thailand) Pairojnoi Sor.Siamchai	Lumpinee Stadium	Bangkok, Thailand	Decision	5	3:00
1987-06-19	Draw	(Thailand) Amnatsak Sor.Sinsawat	Onesongchai, Lumpinee Stadium	Bangkok, Thailand	Decision	5	3:00
1987-05-30	Win	(Thailand) Dennarong Sit Kaipa	Onesongchai, Lumpinee Stadium	Bangkok, Thailand	Decision	5	3:00
1987-04-11	Loss	(Thailand) Amnatsak Sor.Sinsawat	Onesongchai, Lumpinee Stadium	Bangkok, Thailand	Decision	5	3:00
1987-02-14	Loss	(Thailand) Haodong Sor.Thasanee	Onesongchai,	Bangkok, Thailand	Decision	5	3:00
1987-01-13	Win	(Thailand) Songchainoi Por.SomjitAir	Onesongchai, Lumpinee Stadium	Bangkok, Thailand	Decision	5	3:00
1986-12-19	Win	(Thailand) Panomrunglek Chor.Sawat	Huamark Stadium	Bangkok, Thailand	Decision	5	3:00
1986-11-25	Win	(Thailand) Komkhai Kiatcharoen	Onesongchai, Lumpinee Stadium	Bangkok, Thailand	Decision	5	3:00
1986-09-30	Win	(Thailand) Amnatsak Sor.Sinsawat	Onesongchai, Lumpinee Stadium	Bangkok, Thailand	Decision	5	3:00
1986-08-29	Win	(Thailand) Daonoi Sakwicha	Onesongchai, Lumpinee Stadium	Bangkok, Thailand	Decision	5	3:00
1986-07-29	Win	(Thailand) Samad Sor.Lukindia	Onesongchai, Lumpinee Stadium	Bangkok, Thailand	Decision	5	3:00
1986-	Win	(Thailand) Saengdawnoi Tor.Silachai	Lumpinee Stadium	Bangkok, Thailand	Decision	5	3:00
1986-	Win	(Thailand) Wanchai Sor.Weerakul	Lumpinee Stadium	Bangkok, Thailand	Decision	5	3:00
1986-	Win	(Thailand) Rungrat Krisaenchai	Lumpinee Stadium	Bangkok, Thailand	Decision	5	3:00
1986-	Win	(Thailand) Daonoi Daonakhonpatom	Lumpinee Stadium	Bangkok, Thailand	Decision	5	3:00
1986-03-04	Loss	(Thailand) Saengdawnoi Tor.Silachai	Lumpinee Stadium	Bangkok, Thailand	Decision	5	3:00
1986-	Loss	(Thailand) Nuengthoranee Petchyindee	Lumpinee Stadium	Bangkok, Thailand	Decision	5	3:00
1986-01-01	Win	(Thailand) Kornlakarn Petchyindee		Chaopraya, Thailand	Decision	5	3:00
1985-	Win	(Thailand) Nuengthoranee Petchyindee		Samrong, Thailand	Decision	5	3:00
1985-	Win	(Thailand) Jonoi Wittayakonsong	Rajadamnern Stadium	Bangkok, Thailand	TKO	3	
1985-	Win	(Thailand) Payoongsak Tor.Nopparat		Khon Kaen, Thailand	KO	1	
1985-	Win	(Thailand) Dekpam Na Nongkhae	Rajadamnern Stadium	Bangkok, Thailand	Decision	5	3:00
1985-	Win	(Thailand) Mongkolphet Sakchamroen	Rajadamnern Stadium	Bangkok, Thailand	Decision	5	3:00
1985-	Loss	(Thailand) Saksri Yutthakit	Rajadamnern Stadium	Bangkok, Thailand	Decision	5	3:00
1985-	Win	(Thailand) Thongrap Kwanchai	Samrong Stadium	Thailand	Decision	5	3:00
1985-	Draw	(Thailand) Panomrung Suthornkiat		Chonburi, Thailand	Decision	5	3:00
Legend: Win Loss Draw/No contest Notes
