= Nungubon Sitlerchai =

Thai former professional Muay Thai fighter

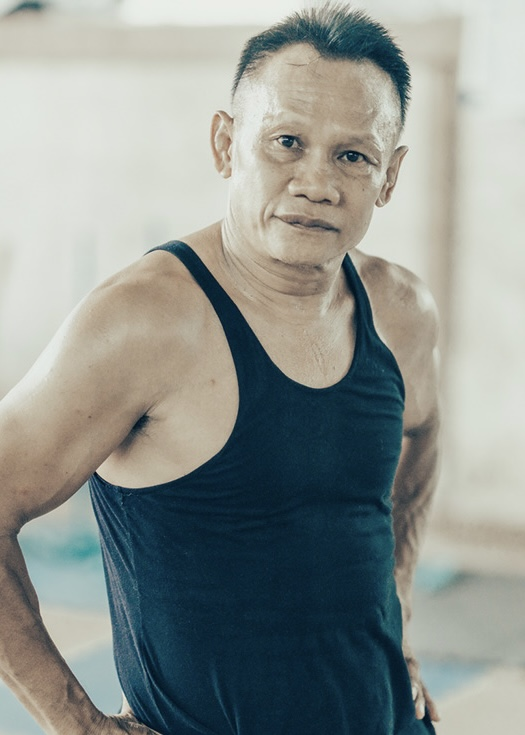
- Nungubon in 2024
- Born: Samorn Kwamsawat; March 20, 1971 (age 55); Ubon Ratchathani Province, Thailand
- Native name: หนึ่งอุบล ศิษย์เลิศชัย
- Nickname: The Limp (ต่วนเป๋)
- Height: 162 cm (5 ft 4 in)
- Division: Mini Flyweight; Flyweight; Super Flyweight; Bantamweight; Super Bantamweight
- Style: Muay Thai (Muay Femur)
- Stance: Orthodox
- Fighting out of: Ubon Ratchathani, Thailand
- Team: Por.Muangubon-Sitlerchai Gym
- Trainer: Kru Pot Wongmuangchan

Professional boxing record
- Total: 16
- Wins: 15
- By knockout: 4
- Losses: 1

Kickboxing record
- Total: 233
- Wins: 200
- Losses: 30
- Draws: 3

Other information
- Occupation: Muay Thai trainer
- Boxing record from BoxRec

Samorn Kwamsawat (Thai: สมร ความสวัสดิ์; born March 20, 1971), known professionally as Nungubon Sitlerchai (Thai: หนึ่งอุบล ศิษย์เลิศชัย), is a Thai former professional Muay Thai fighter and boxer. He is a former four-division Lumpinee Stadium champion who was famous in the 1990s and 2000s.

Notably, nine years after winning his first title, he'd defeat the rising star Saenchai for his fourth and final title.

== Biography and career ==
=== Pre-Bangkok career ===
Kwamsawat was born on March 20, 1971 in Ubon Ratchathani province. He first discovered Muay Thai by watching fights on television and later started training with the encouragement of his older brother. His initial training began at age 7 in his home. At 16-years-old he joined the Por.Muangubon-Sitlerchai gym located in his local province. He would then begin training under the gym's owner, Kru Pot Wongmuangchan, and became a teammate of award-winning champion Orono Por.Muangubon. He had numerous fights in the Isaan region at 42 kg/92.6 lbs. He would adopt the ring name of Nungubon Sitlerchai.

His ring name "Nungubon" translates to "#1 of Ubon." There are also alternate ways to anglicize Nungubon's ring name such as Neung Ubon Sit Lertchai, Nung-Ubon, Neungubon, etc.

=== Elite career ===
Nungubon was an orthodox Muay Femur fighter (rope-a-dope stylist in Muay Thai) who was skilled with punches and kicks from both legs. Nungubon was born with his left leg longer than his right, resulting in the Thai media nicknaming him Tuan Pae (translates to "The Limp" or "The Lame"). Despite this physical abnormality, Nungubon would become an accomplished fighter from 1990 to 1999. In fact, Nungubon's favorite technique was his lead left kick to the body which he often used to interrupt his opponents' aggression and would sometimes cause them to get redirected, allowing Nungubon to circle away from his opponents. Another one of Nungubon's signature techniques which can repeatedly be seen in his fights is his powerful right cross which he would use to KO Wangchannoi Sor.Palangchai and to knockdown "The Batman" Samkor Kiatmonthep or Kaensak Sor.Ploenchit.

2 years after joining the Por.Muangubon gym, he would make his Bangkok debut at 18-years-old. He would begin fighting for the Onesongchai promotion, considered the best fight promotion of the golden era of Muay Thai. The victories on Nungubon's fight record is filled with championship and award-winning fighters. In particular, he has victories from 8 different Sports Writer's Association Fighter of the Year award winners: Langsuan Panyuthaphum (KO), Kaensak Sor.Ploenchit, Jaroensap Kiatbanchong, Wangchannoi Sor.Palangchai (KO), and others. For context, the Sports Writer's Association Fighter of the Year award is considered in Thailand to be the most prestigious title a Muay Thai fighter can win.

Nungubon's prime lasted from 1990 and 1996, during which he would earn 3 Lumpinee titles in 3 weight classes against elite fighters such as Kompayak Singmanee or Langsuan Panyuthaphum. His 4th and most notable title capture was when Nungubon was past his prime, being visibly slower and less agile as he was matched up against Saenchai in 1999. During this time, Saenchai had entered the peak of his career by winning the highly prestigious Fighter of the Year award and losing no other fight that in 1999 except his first title fight against Nungubon. Nungubon stated that his favorite memory from his career was winning the Lumpinee mini flyweight title (105 lbs/47.6 kg) against Kompayak Singmanee in 1990. Nungubon has stated that the most difficult opponent he ever faced was "The Top Master" Karuhat Sor.Supawan.

While Nungubon excelled in kicking as can be seen in his fights, he also excelled in punching. He took advantage of his boxing skills to earn 15 victories out of 16 fights in boxing matches held by the Pan Asian Boxing Association. He earned the PABA bantamweight title (118 lbs/53.5 kg) and defended it twice.

Nungubon's Muay Thai career within Thailand was unusually long, as most fighters from his generation (fighters that rose to prominence in early 1990s or late 1980s) such as Karuhat Sor.Supawan or Kaensak Sor.Ploenchit had stopped taking matchups from top Thai competition before the 2000s. Nungubon would continue to challenge elite fighters including the Sitjaopho twins, Fahsuchon Sit-O, and Anuwat Kaewsamrit between 2000-2003. The highest fight purse Nungubon received was 180,000 baht, which is 180% the usual pay of yodmuay (top fighters).

=== Post-retirement ===
After his fighting career Nungubon opened his own gym named Sit Nungubon in his native province of Ubon Ratchathani. The gym is one of two camps within the same building, the other camp being the Santi Ubon gym which also accepts fighters from the Sit Nungubon gym.

== Titles and honors ==
=== Muay Thai ===
- Lumpinee Stadium
  - 1990 Lumpinee Stadium Mini Flyweight (105 lbs) Champion
  - 1991 Lumpinee Stadium Flyweight (112 lbs) Champion
  - 1995 Lumpinee Stadium Super Flyweight (115 lbs) Champion
  - 1996 Lumpinee Stadium Fight of the Year (vs Hansuk Prasathinpanomrung on July 26)
  - 1996 Lumpinee Stadium Fighter of the Year
  - 1999 Lumpinee Stadium Bantamweight (118 lbs) Champion

=== Boxing ===
- Pan Asian Boxing Association
  - 1996 PABA Bantamweight (118 lbs) Champion
    - Two successful title defenses

== Muay Thai record ==
Muay Thai Record
200 Wins, 30 Losses, 3 Draws
Date	Result	Opponent	Event	Location	Method	Round	Time
2013-07-21	Loss	(Thailand) Lakhin Wassandasit		Bangkok, Thailand	Decision	5	3:00
2013-12-	Loss	(Thailand) Jaroensap Kiatbanchong	Lumpinee Stadium	Bangkok, Thailand	Decision	5	3:00
2013-03-	Loss	(Thailand) Jaroensap Kiatbanchong	Rajadamnern Stadium	Bangkok, Thailand	Decision	5	3:00
2008-12-13	Loss	(Germany) Valdet Gashi	The Champions Club Germany 2008	Germany	Decision	5	3:00
2003-09-12	Loss	Thailand Pinsinchai	Lumpinee Stadium	Bangkok, Thailand	Decision	5	3:00
2003-06-15	Win	(Thailand) Nampet Sit.Or	Channel 7 Stadium	Bangkok, Thailand	Decision	5	3:00
2003-04-18	Loss	(Thailand) Phetek Kiatyongyut	Lumpinee Stadium	Bangkok, Thailand	Decision	5	3:00
2003-03-23	Win	(Thailand) Sitthichai Kiyarat	Channel 7 Stadium	Bangkok, Thailand	Decision	5	3:00
2002-07-16	Loss	(Thailand) Chanchainoi Kiatprapas	Phet Burapha, Lumpinee Stadium	Bangkok, Thailand	Decision	5	3:00
2002-01-11		(Thailand) Chalermpol Kiatsunanta	Lumpinee Stadium	Bangkok, Thailand			
?	Win	(Thailand) Tubnar Sitromsai	Rajadamnern Stadium	Bangkok, Thailand	Decision	5	3:00
2001-	Loss	(Thailand) Anuwat Kaewsamrit		Bangkok, Thailand	Decision	5	3:00
2001-07-17	Loss	(Thailand) Fahsuchon Sit-O	Lumpinee Stadium	Bangkok, Thailand	Decision	5	3:00
For the vacant Thailand and Lumpinee Stadium Bantamweight (118 lbs) titles.
2001-06-12	Win	(Thailand) Rungrawee Sor.Ploenchit	Lumpinee Stadium	Bangkok, Thailand	Decision	5	3:00
2001-05-25	Win	(Thailand) Fahsuchon Sit-O	Lumpinee Stadium	Bangkok, Thailand	Decision	5	3:00
2001-04-22	Win	(Thailand) Rungrawee Sor.Ploenchit	Channel 7 Stadium	Bangkok, Thailand	Decision	5	3:00
2001-02-06	Loss	(Thailand) Yodbuangam Lukbanyai	Lumpinee Stadium	Bangkok, Thailand	Decision	5	3:00
2001-01-19	Win	(Thailand) Sanghiran Lukbanyai	Lumpinee Stadium	Bangkok, Thailand	Decision	5	3:00
2000-09-02	Draw	(Thailand) Phet-to Sitjaopho	Lumpinee Stadium	Bangkok, Thailand	Decision	5	3:00
2000-08-04	Loss	(Thailand) Phet-Ek Sitjaopho	Lumpinee Stadium	Bangkok, Thailand	Decision	5	3:00
1999-12-07	Loss	(Thailand) Wanpichai Sor.Khamsing	Lumpinee Stadium	Bangkok, Thailand	Decision (Split)	5	3:00
1999-06-04	Loss	(Thailand) Chalamkhao Kiatpanthong	Onesongchai, Lumpinee Stadium	Bangkok, Thailand	Decision (Unanimous)	5	3:00
1999-04-23	Loss	(Thailand) Saenchai Sor. Kingstar	Onesongchai, Lumpinee Stadium	Bangkok, Thailand	Decision	5	3:00
Loses the Lumpinee Stadium Bantamweight (118 lbs) title.
1999-03-05	Win	(Thailand) Saenchai Sor. Kingstar	Lumpinee Stadium	Bangkok, Thailand	Decision (Split)	5	3:00
Wins the Lumpinee Stadium Bantamweight (118 lbs) title.
1999-02-05	Win	(Thailand) Chansak Singklongsi	Onesongchai, Lumpinee Stadium	Bangkok, Thailand	Decision	5	3:00
1999-01-12	Loss	(Thailand) Chalamkhao Kiatpanthong	Lumpinee Stadium	Bangkok, Thailand	Decision	5	3:00
1998-11-13	Win	(Thailand) Khunpinit Kiatthawan	Onesongchai, Lumpinee Stadium	Bangkok, Thailand	Decision	5	3:00
1998-09-12	Win	(Thailand) Saenchai Jirakriangkrai	Lumpinee Stadium	Bangkok, Thailand	Decision	5	3:00
1998-	Loss	(Thailand) Chaichana Dechtawee	Lumpinee Stadium	Bangkok, Thailand	Decision	5	3:00
1998-05-26	Loss	(Thailand) Sod Looknongyangtoy	Lumpinee Stadium	Bangkok, Thailand	Decision	5	3:00
1998-03-02	Loss	(Thailand) Newsaencherng Pinsinchai	Rajadamnern Stadium	Bangkok, Thailand	Decision	5	3:00
1997-11-28	Win	(Thailand) Densiam Lukprabat	Lumpinee Stadium	Bangkok, Thailand	Decision	5	3:00
1997-09-05	Loss	(Thailand) Kochasarn Singklonksi	Lumpinee Stadium	Bangkok, Thailand	Decision	5	3:00
1996-11-29	Win	(Thailand) Kaolan Kaovichit	Lumpinee Stadium	Bangkok, Thailand	KO (Punches)	2	
1996-10-11	Loss	(Thailand) Ritthichai Lukjaopordam	Lumpinee Stadium	Bangkok, Thailand	Decision	5	3:00
For the vacant Lumpinee Stadium Super Bantamweight (122 lbs) title.
1996-08-23	Win	(Thailand) Hansuk Prasathinpanomrung	Lumpinee Stadium	Bangkok, Thailand	Decision	5	3:00
1996-07-26	Win	(Thailand) Hansuk Prasathinpanomrung	Lumpinee Stadium	Bangkok, Thailand	Decision	5	3:00
1996-06-25	Win	(Thailand) Baiphet Loogjaomaesaiwaree	Lumpinee Stadium	Bangkok, Thailand	Decision	5	3:00
1996-05-03	Win	(Thailand) Ritthichai Lukjaopordam	Lumpinee Stadium	Bangkok, Thailand	Decision	5	3:00
1996-03-26	Win	(Thailand) Dao Udon Sor.Suchart	Lumpinee Stadium	Bangkok, Thailand	Decision	5	3:00
1996-02-13	Draw	(Thailand) Dao Udon Sor.Suchart	Lumpinee Stadium	Bangkok, Thailand	Decision	5	3:00
1995-11-17	Win	(Thailand) Chaiyai Sittheppitak	Lumpinee Stadium	Bangkok, Thailand	Decision	5	3:00
1995-09-30	Loss	(Thailand) Dokmaipa Por.Pongsawang	Lumpinee Stadium	Bangkok, Thailand	Decision	5	3:00
1995-08-25	Loss	(Thailand) Kaensak Sor.Ploenjit	Lumpinee Stadium	Bangkok, Thailand	Decision	5	3:00
1995-06-30	Win	(Thailand) Dokmaipa Por.Pongsawang	Lumpinee Stadium	Bangkok, Thailand	Decision	5	3:00
1995-06-09	Win	(Thailand) Nongnarong Looksamrong	Lumpinee Stadium	Bangkok, Thailand	Decision	5	3:00
1995-04-28	Win	(Thailand) Yodsiam Sor.Prantalay	Lumpinee Stadium	Bangkok, Thailand	Decision	5	3:00
Wins the vacant Lumpinee Stadium Super Flyweight (115 lbs) title.
1995-02-22	Draw	(Thailand) Sornsuknoi Sakwichan	Lumpinee Stadium	Bangkok, Thailand	Decision	5	3:00
1995-01-03	Win	(Thailand) Thongchai Tor.Silachai	Lumpinee Stadium	Bangkok, Thailand	Decision	5	3:00
1994-11-15	Win	(Thailand) Nongnarong Looksamrong	Lumpinee Stadium	Bangkok, Thailand	Decision	5	3:00
1994-10-28	Loss	(Thailand) Nongnarong Looksamrong	Lumpinee Stadium	Bangkok, Thailand	Decision	5	3:00
1994-09-20	Win	(Thailand) Kruekchai Kaewsamrit	Lumpinee Stadium	Bangkok, Thailand	Decision	5	3:00
1994-08-27	Loss	(Thailand) Yokthai Sithoar	Lumpinee Stadium	Bangkok, Thailand	Decision	5	3:00
1994-08-09	Loss	(Thailand) Yokthai Sithoar	Lumpinee Stadium	Bangkok, Thailand	Decision	5	3:00
1994-06-28	Loss	(Thailand) Saengmorakot Sor.Ploenchit	Lumpinee Stadium	Bangkok, Thailand	Decision	5	3:00
1994-05-31	Loss	(Thailand) Meechok Sor.Ploenchit	Lumpinee Stadium	Bangkok, Thailand	Decision	5	3:00
1994-03-25	Win	(Thailand) Kaensak Sor.Ploenjit	Lumpinee Stadium	Bangkok, Thailand	Decision	5	3:00
1994-03-04	Win	(Thailand) Samkor Chor.Rathchatasupak	Lumpinee Stadium	Bangkok, Thailand	TKO (3 Knockdowns/punches)	3	
1994-01-28	Loss	(Thailand) Samkor Chor.Rathchatasupak	Lumpinee Stadium	Bangkok, Thailand	Decision	5	3:00
1994-01-07	Loss	(Thailand) Kaensak Sor.Ploenjit	Lumpinee Stadium	Bangkok, Thailand	Decision	5	3:00
1993-12-03	Win	(Thailand) Silapathai Jockygym	Lumpinee Stadium	Bangkok, Thailand	Decision	5	3:00
1993-10-22	Win	(Thailand) Hansuk Prasathinpanomrung	Lumpinee Stadium	Bangkok, Thailand	Decision	5	3:00
1993-09-17	Loss	(Thailand) Kaensak Sor.Ploenjit	Lumpinee Stadium	Bangkok, Thailand	Decision	5	3:00
1993-08-08	Win	(Thailand) Rittidet Kerdpayak	Lumpinee Stadium	Bangkok, Thailand	Decision	5	3:00
1993-06-25	Loss	(Thailand) Karuhat Sor.Supawan	Lumpinee Stadium	Bangkok, Thailand	Decision	5	3:00
1993-06-08	Loss	(Thailand) Jaroensap Kiatbanchong	Lumpinee Stadium	Bangkok, Thailand	Decision	5	3:00
1993-03-16	Loss	(Thailand) Karuhat Sor.Supawan	Lumpinee Stadium	Bangkok, Thailand	Decision	5	3:00
1993-02-05	Loss	(Thailand) Jaroensap Kiatbanchong	Lumpinee Stadium	Bangkok, Thailand	Decision	5	3:00
1993-01-	Loss	(Thailand) Jaroensap Kiatbanchong	Lumpinee Stadium	Bangkok, Thailand	Decision	5	3:00
1992-12-04	Win	(Thailand) Duangsomgpong Por.Pongsawang	Lumpinee Stadium	Bangkok, Thailand	Decision	5	3:00
1992-09-04	NC	(Thailand) Pompetch Kiatchatpayak	Lumpinee Stadium	Bangkok, Thailand	Ref.stop (Nungubon dismissed)	5	
1992-07-27	NC	(Thailand) Karuhat Sor.Supawan	Lumpinee Stadium	Bangkok, Thailand	Ref.stop (Karuhat dismissed)	5	
1992-06-30	Win	(Thailand) Wangchannoi Sor.Palangchai	Lumpinee Stadium	Bangkok, Thailand	KO (Body kick)	2	
1992-05-27	Loss	(Thailand) Veeraphol Sahaprom	Lumpinee Stadium	Bangkok, Thailand	Decision	5	3:00
1992-05-05	NC	(Thailand) Duangsompong Por.Pongsawang	Lumpinee Stadium	Bangkok, Thailand	Referee stoppage		
1992-03-10	Loss	(Thailand) Dokmaipa Por.Pongsawang	Lumpinee Stadium	Bangkok, Thailand	Decision	5	3:00
1992-01-31	Loss	(Thailand) Dokmaipa Por.Pongsawang	Lumpinee Stadium	Bangkok, Thailand	Decision	5	3:00
1992-01-07	Win	(Thailand) Panphet Muangsurin	Lumpinee Stadium	Bangkok, Thailand	Decision	5	3:00
1991-12-06	Win	(Thailand) Chainoi Muangsurin	Lumpinee Stadium	Bangkok, Thailand	Decision	5	3:00
1991-11-05	Win	(Thailand) Chainoi Muangsurin	Lumpinee Stadium	Bangkok, Thailand	Decision	5	3:00
1991-10-18	Loss	(Thailand) Karuhat Sor.Supawan	Lumpinee Stadium	Bangkok, Thailand	Decision	5	3:00
1991-09-17	Win	(Thailand) Langsuan Panyuthaphum	Lumpinee Stadium	Bangkok, Thailand	Decision	5	3:00
1991-08-06	Win	(Thailand) Langsuan Panyuthaphum	Lumpinee Stadium	Bangkok, Thailand	TKO (Doctor stoppage)	4	
Wins the Lumpinee Stadium Flyweight (112 lbs) title.
1991-06-28	Win	(Thailand) Jaroensap Kiatbanchong	Lumpinee Stadium	Bangkok, Thailand	Decision	5	3:00
1991-06-14	Win	(Thailand) Pairojnoi Sor.Siamchai	Lumpinee Stadium	Bangkok, Thailand	Decision	5	3:00
1991-05-11	Win	(Thailand) Pornsak Muangsurin	Lumpinee Stadium	Bangkok, Thailand	Decision	5	3:00
1991-03-31	Loss	(Thailand) Dokmaipa Por.Pongsawang	Lumpinee Stadium	Bangkok, Thailand	Decision	5	3:00
1991-03-01	Loss	(Thailand) Pongsiri Por.Ruamrudee	Lumpinee Stadium	Bangkok, Thailand	Decision	5	3:00
1991-02-12	Win	(Thailand) Paruhatlek Sitchunthong	Lumpinee Stadium	Bangkok, Thailand	Decision	5	3:00
1991-01-21	Win	(Thailand) Sornsuknoi Sakwichan	Rajadamnern Stadium	Bangkok, Thailand	Decision	5	3:00
1990-12-04	Loss	(Thailand) Morakot Sor.Thamarangsri	Lumpinee Stadium	Bangkok, Thailand	Decision	5	3:00
1990-11-03	Loss	(Thailand) Pornsak Muangsurin	Lumpinee Stadium	Bangkok, Thailand	Decision	5	3:00
1990-09-28	Loss	(Thailand) D-Day Kiatmungkan	Lumpinee Stadium	Bangkok, Thailand	Decision	5	3:00
1990-09-11	Win	(Thailand) Khanunthong JohnnyGym	Rajadamnern Stadium	Bangkok, Thailand	Decision	5	3:00
1990-08-21	Loss	(Thailand) Thongchai Tor.Silachai	Lumpinee Stadium	Bangkok, Thailand	Decision	5	3:00
Loses the Lumpinee Stadium Mini Flyweight (105 lbs) title.
1990-07-25	Loss	(Thailand) Hippy Singmanee	Lumpinee Stadium	Bangkok, Thailand	Decision	5	3:00
1990-06-25	Loss	(Thailand) Kompayak Singmanee	Rajadamnern Stadium	Bangkok, Thailand	Decision	5	3:00
1990-06-08	Win	(Thailand) Saengdaw Kiatanan	Lumpinee Stadium	Bangkok, Thailand	Decision	5	3:00
1990-05-15	Win	(Thailand) Hippy Singmanee	Lumpinee Stadium	Bangkok, Thailand	Decision	5	3:00
1990-04-24	Win	(Thailand) Moohok Tor.Hintok	Lumpinee Stadium	Bangkok, Thailand	Decision	5	3:00
1990-03-30	Win	(Thailand) Kompayak Singmanee	Lumpinee Stadium	Bangkok, Thailand	Decision	5	3:00
Wins the Lumpinee Stadium Mini Flyweight (105 lbs) title.
1990-03-06	Draw	(Thailand) Jaroensap Kiatbanchong	Lumpinee Stadium	Bangkok, Thailand	Decision	5	3:00
1990-02-06	Win	(Thailand) Methanoi Sor.Maliwan	Lumpinee Stadium	Bangkok, Thailand	Decision	5	3:00
1990-01-20	Win	(Thailand) Thongchai Tor.Silachai	Lumpinee Stadium	Bangkok, Thailand	Decision	5	3:00
1990-01-02	Win	(Thailand) Kengkajnoi Sor.Weerakul	Lumpinee Stadium	Bangkok, Thailand	Decision	5	3:00
1989-11-20	Win	(Thailand) Chandet Sor.Prantalay	Rajadamnern Stadium	Bangkok, Thailand	Decision	5	3:00
1989-11-03	Loss	(Thailand) Chandet Sor.Prantalay	Lumpinee Stadium	Bangkok, Thailand	Decision	5	3:00
1989-09-09	Loss	(Thailand) Khwanla Sitbangprachan		Bangkok, Thailand	Decision	5	3:00
1989-06-13	Loss	(Thailand) Jaroensap Kiatbanchong	Lumpinee Stadium	Bangkok, Thailand	Decision	5	3:00
1989-05-12	Loss	(Thailand) Tukatathong Por.Pongsawang	Lumpinee Stadium	Bangkok, Thailand	Decision	5	3:00
1989-04-11	Loss	(Thailand) Khwanla Sitbangprachan		Bangkok, Thailand	Decision	5	3:00
1989-03-06	Win	(Thailand) Methanoi Sor Maliwan	Rajadamnern Stadium	Bangkok, Thailand	Decision	5	3:00
1989-01-07	Loss	(Thailand) Khwanla Sitbangprachan		Bangkok, Thailand	Decision	5	3:00
1988-12-16	Win	(Thailand) Sangpetchnoi Chor.Maylada	Lumpinee Stadium	Bangkok, Thailand	Decision	5	3:00
1988-11-04	Loss	(Thailand) Sakmongkol Sithchuchok	Lumpinee Stadium	Bangkok, Thailand	Decision	5	3:00
1988-10-11	Win	(Thailand) Wisanlek Lukbangplasoi	Lumpinee Stadium	Bangkok, Thailand	Decision	5	3:00
1988-05-03	Win	(Thailand) Thanufai Sor.Ploenchit	Lumpinee Stadium	Bangkok, Thailand	Decision	5	3:00
Legend: Win Loss Draw/No contest Notes
