= Wangchannoi Sor.Palangchai =

Thai former professional Muay Thai fighter

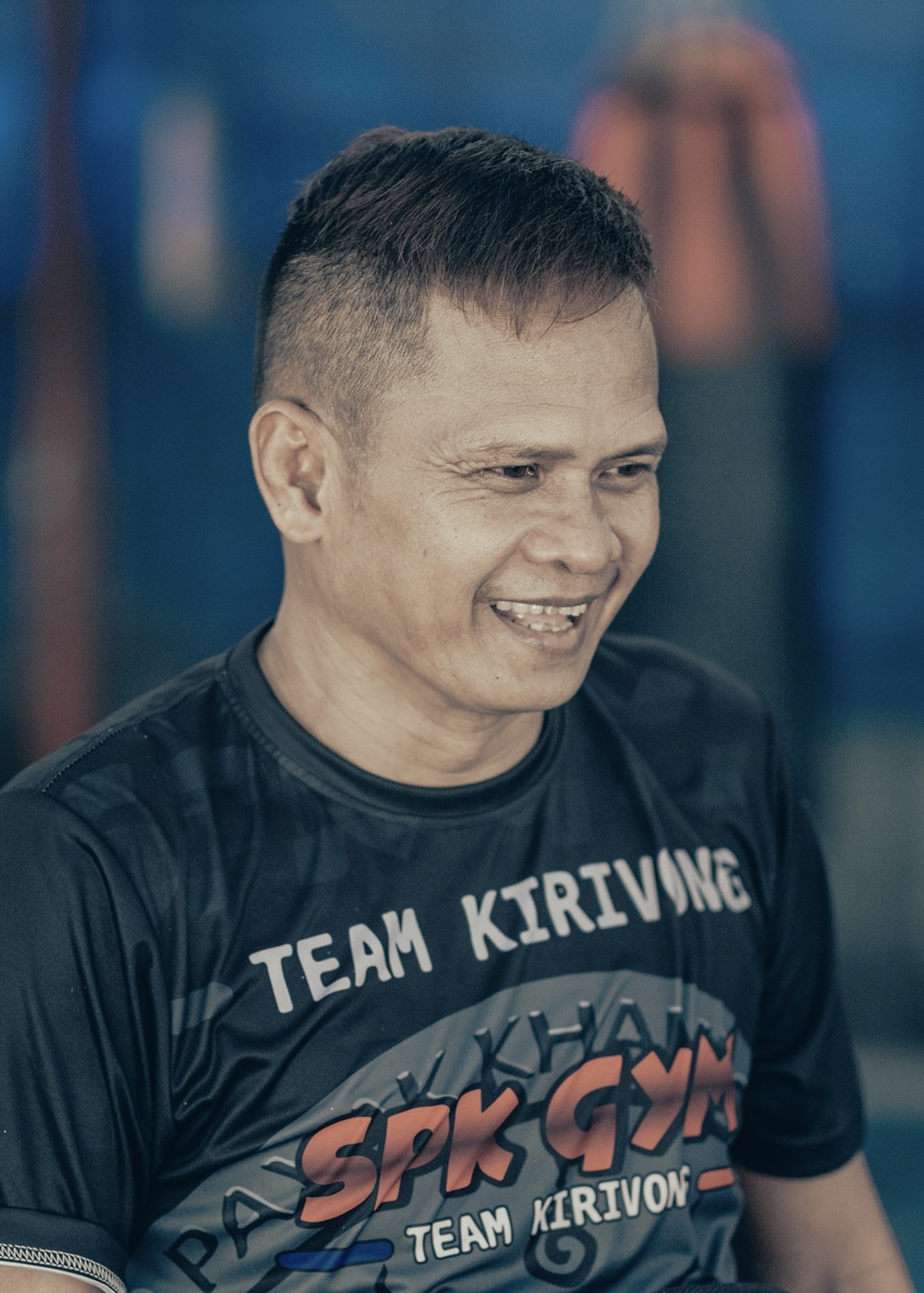
- Wangchannoi in 2023
- Born: Arporn Sophap; May 30, 1967 (age 59); Khok Samrong, Lopburi, Thailand
- Native name: อาภรณ์ โสภาพ
- Other names: Wangchannoi Sor.Sirada (วังจั่นน้อย ส.สิระดา); Wangchannoi Wor.Walapon (วังจั่นน้อย ว.วราพล); Wangchannoi Chor.Tabtimto (วังจั่นน้อย ช.ทับทิมโต); Wangchannoi 13Coinstower (วังจั่นน้อย 13เหรียญทาวเวอร์)
- Nickname: 33-Second Puncher (ไอ้หมัด 33 วิ); Cross Punch Savant (เมธีหมัดตรง); Grim Reaper from Lavo (พระกาฬละโว้); Chivas Kid (ไอ้หนุ่มชีวาส)
- Height: 170 cm (5 ft 7 in)
- Division: Mini Flyweight; Light Flyweight; Flyweight; Super Bantamweight
- Style: Muay Thai (Muay Femur / Muay Mat)
- Stance: Orthodox
- Years active: c. 1985—2001

Kickboxing record
- Total: 300
- Wins: 267
- By knockout: 40
- Losses: 30
- Draws: 3

Other information
- Notable school: Rattana Commercial School

Arporn Sophap (Thai: อาภรณ์ โสภาพ; born: May 30, 1967), known professionally as Wangchannoi Sor.Palangchai (Thai: วังจั่นน้อย ส.พลังชัย), is a Thai former professional Muay Thai fighter. He is a former five-time Lumpinee Stadium champion across two divisions, as well as the 1993 Sports Writers Association of Thailand Fighter of the Year, who was famous in the 1980s and 1990s. Nicknamed the "Cross Punch Savant", he was especially known for his punching ability and is often regarded amongst the greatest fighters in Muay Thai history.

== Biography and career ==
Arporn Sophap was born on May 30, 1967 in Tambon Wang Chan, Amphoe Khok Samrong, Lopburi Province in central Thailand. He began his career at the age of 10 and quickly built a reputation in his hometown. Later, he moved to Bangkok to fight under the renowned promoter Songchai Rattanasuban. He would also receive a diploma from Rattana Commercial School (now Rattana Bundit University).

He gained wider recognition after defeating Namphon Nongkeepahuyuth to win the Lumpinee Stadium Junior Flyweight title on the undercard for the WBC World Super Flyweight title fight between Gilberto Román and Kongtoranee Payakaroon. Eventually, he vacated the Flyweight title as he moved up in weight. He’d go on to earn the Junior Featherweight title a total of four times. At his peak, his highest fight purse reached 260,000 baht. He faced many of the greatest fighters of his era including Samart Payakaroon, Karuhat Sor.Supawan, Chamuekpet Hapalang, Kongtoranee Payakaroon, Kaensak Sor.Ploenjit, Lamnamoon Sor.Sumalee, Samransak Muangsurin, Jaroenthong Kiatbanchong, Oley Kiatoneway, Langsuan Panyuthaphum, Cherry Sor.Wanich, Chatchai Paiseetong, Namkabuan Nongkeepahuyuth, Boonlai Sor.Thanikul, and Nungubon Sitlerchai.

His match against Samart was particularly memorable, as Samart was widely considered the greatest Muay Thai fighter of the era. Wangchannoi defeated him on the undercard of the IBF Junior Flyweight World title fight between Tacy Macalos and Muangchai Kittikasem, held on May 2, 1989, at Lumpinee Stadium. Following the bout, Samart announced his immediate retirement in the ring. In 1993, Wangchannoi was named Fighter of the Year. In 1993, he was awarded best fighter of the year.

He earned many nicknames including the 33-Second Puncher after knocking out Namkabuan Nongkeepahuyuth in just 33 seconds of the first round. He also became known as the Chivas Lad due to his frequent post-fight drinking sessions with friends.

== Retirement ==
He would retire from the stadiums of Thailand after losing to Rambojiew Por.Tubtim on January 1, 1997 Afterwards, he was trainer at his older brother's Muay Thai gym before moving to France to work as a trainer and fight foreign competition.

At present, Wangchannoi is a trainer at "Chor Hapayak Gym" at Tambon Lam Luk Ka, Amphoe Lam Luk Ka, Pathum Thani province.

== Titles and honours ==
- Lumpinee Stadium
  - 1986 Lumpinee Stadium Light Flyweight (108 lbs) Champion
  - 1988 Lumpinee Stadium Super Bantamweight (122 lbs) Champion
    - One successful title defense
  - 1991 Lumpinee Stadium Super Bantamweight (122 lbs) Champion
  - 1993 Lumpinee Stadium Super Bantamweight (122 lbs) Champion
  - 1994 Lumpinee Stadium Super Bantamweight (122 lbs) Champion
- International Muay Thai Council
  - 2001 IMTC World Champion
- Sports Writers Association of Thailand
  - 1993 Fighter of the Year

== Fight record ==
Muay Thai record
Date	Result	Opponent	Event	Location	Method	Round	Time
2001-	Loss	(Netherlands) Nourdine El Otmani		Amsterdam, Netherlands			
2000-11-05	Win	(United Kingdom) Damien Trainor	Painthorpe Country Club	Wakefield, England	TKO (Jumping knee)	3	
2000-06-12	Win	(Portugal) Joao Monteiro		Fort-de-France, Martinique			
2000-05-	Win	(France) Djamel Yacouben		Clermont-Ferrand, France	Decision	5	3:00
2000-05-20	Win	(France) Christophe Leveque	Gala France Thaïlande	Villebon-sur-Yvette, France	KO	4	
2000-04-22	Win	(Scotland) Stevie Sheddeon		Scotland	KO	3	
Wins IMTC World title.
2000-02-12	Win	(France) Julien Muller		Nantes, France	Decision	5	3:00
1999-12-05	Win	(Portugal) Joao Monteiro		Saint-Nazaire, France			
1999-11-13	Win	(France) Jean-Marc Savonnier		France			
1997-01-10	Loss	(Thailand) Rambojiew Por.Tubtim	Rajadamnern Stadium	Bangkok, Thailand	Decision	5	3:00
1996-11-02	Loss	(Thailand) Sakubon Por.Muangubon	Lumpinee Stadium - Mitsubishi Strada Tournament	Bangkok, Thailand	Decision	5	3:00
1996-10-05	Loss	(Thailand) Dokmafai Tor.Sithichai	Lumpinee Stadium - Mitsubishi Strada Tournament	Bangkok, Thailand	Decision	5	3:00
1996-09-07	Win	(Thailand) Rungchai Kiattipramuk	Lumpinee Stadium - Mitsubishi Strada Tournament	Bangkok, Thailand	Decision	5	3:00
1995-11-13	Win	(Thailand) Thaphisut Sor.Maliwan	Rajadamnern Stadium	Bangkok, Thailand	Decision	5	3:00
1995-08-19	Win	(Thailand) Prayut Na Phinthorn	Lumpinee Stadium	Bangkok, Thailand	Decision	5	3:00
1995-06-27	Loss	(Thailand) Kaoponglek Luksuratum	Onesongchai, Lumpinee Stadium	Bangkok, Thailand	Decision (Unanimous)	5	3:00
1995-06-09	Win	(Thailand) Teerapong Sitkorayuth	Onesongchai, Lumpinee Stadium	Bangkok, Thailand	Decision (Unanimous)	5	3:00
1995-04-18	Loss	(Thailand) Jompoplek Sor.Sumalee	Fairtex, Lumpinee Stadium	Bangkok, Thailand	Decision (Unanimous)	5	3:00
1995-02-28	Win	(Thailand) Keng Singnakhonkui	Onesongchai, Lumpinee Stadium	Bangkok, Thailand	Decision (Unanimous)	5	3:00
1994-10-10	Loss	(Thailand) Saengmorakot Sor.Ploenchit	Yodnuamthong, Rajadamnern Stadium	Bangkok, Thailand	TKO (Low kicks)	3	
1994-08-26	Loss	(Thailand) Samkor Kiatmontep	Onesongchai, Lumpinee Stadium	Bangkok, Thailand	Decision (Unanimous)	5	3:00
1994-07-29	Loss	(Thailand) Hansuk Prasathinpanomrung	Onesongchai, Lumpinee Stadium	Bangkok, Thailand	Decision (Unanimous)	5	3:00
Loses the Lumpinee Stadium Super Bantamweight (122 lbs) title.
1994-05-27	Win	(Thailand) Boonlai Sor.Thanikul	Lumpinee Stadium	Bangkok, Thailand	Decision	5	3:00
1994-04-29	Win	(Thailand) Karuhat Sor.Supawan	Onesongchai, Lumpinee Stadium	Bangkok, Thailand	Decision (Unanimous)	5	3:00
Wins the Lumpinee Stadium Super Bantamweight (122 lbs) title.
1994-02-15	Win	(Thailand) Kaensak Sor.Ploenjit	Onesongchai, Lumpinee Stadium	Bangkok, Thailand	Decision (Unanimous)	5	3:00
1994-01-07	Win	(Thailand) Karuhat Sor.Supawan	Onesongchai, Lumpinee Stadium	Bangkok, Thailand	Decision (Unanimous)	5	3:00
1993-11-30	Loss	(Thailand) Chatchai Paiseetong	Onesongchai, Lumpinee Stadium	Bangkok, Thailand	Decision (Unanimous)	5	3:00
Loses the Lumpinee Stadium Super Bantamweight (122 lbs) title.
1993-10-22	Win	(Thailand) Chatchai Paiseetong	Onesongchai, Lumpinee Stadium	Bangkok, Thailand	Decision (Split)	5	3:00
Wins the Lumpinee Stadium Super Bantamweight (122 lbs) title. Wins 900,000 baht side-bet.
1993-09-17	Win	(Thailand) Mathee Jadeepitak	Onesongchai, Lumpinee Stadium	Bangkok, Thailand	Decision (Unanimous)	5	3:00
1993-08-31	Win	(Thailand) Jaroensap Kiatbanchong	Onesongchai, Lumpinee Stadium	Bangkok, Thailand	Decision (Unanimous)	5	3:00
1993-07-30	Win	(Thailand) Hansuk Prasathinpanomrung	Lumpinee Stadium	Bangkok, Thailand	Decision	5	3:00
1993-07-11	Win	(Thailand) Jompoplek Sor.Sumalee	Nakhon Sawan Province Stadium	Nakhon Sawan, Thailand	Decision	5	3:00
1993-03-16	Loss	(Thailand) Ritthichai Lookchaomaesaitong	Lumpinee Stadium	Bangkok, Thailand	Decision (Unanimous)	5	3:00
1993-02-05	Loss	(Thailand) Oley Kiatoneway	Onesongchai, Lumpinee Stadium	Bangkok, Thailand	Decision (Unanimous)	5	3:00
1992-12-04	Win	(Thailand) Lamnamoon Sor.Sumalee	Onesongchai, Lumpinee Stadium	Bangkok, Thailand	KO (Left hook & right low kick)	2	
1992-11-06	Loss	(Thailand) Pompetch Naratreekul	Onesongchai, Lumpinee Stadium	Bangkok, Thailand	Decision (Unanimous)	5	3:00
1992-07-11	Win	(Thailand) Jompoplek Sor.Sumalee	Lumpinee Stadium	Bangkok, Thailand	Decision	5	3:00
1992-06-30	Loss	(Thailand) Nungubon Sitlerchai	Onesongchai, Lumpinee Stadium	Bangkok, Thailand	KO (Body kick)	2	
1992-05-29	Loss	(Thailand) Nuathoranee Thongracha	Onesongchai, Lumpinee Stadium	Bangkok, Thailand	Decision (Unanimous)	5	3:00
1992-04-07	Win	(Thailand) Cherry Sor.Wanich	Onesongchai, Lumpinee Stadium	Bangkok, Thailand	KO (Right uppercut)	2	
1992-03-10	Win	(Thailand) Karuhat Sor.Supawan	Onesongchai, Lumpinee Stadium	Bangkok, Thailand	Decision (Unanimous)	5	3:00
1992-01-31	Loss	(Thailand) Boonlai Sor.Thanikul	Onesongchai, Lumpinee Stadium	Bangkok, Thailand	Decision (Unanimous)	5	3:00
Loses the Lumpinee Stadium Super Bantamweight (122 lbs) title.
1991-12-27	Loss	(Thailand) Namkabuan Nongkeepahuyuth	Onesongchai, Lumpinee Stadium	Bangkok, Thailand	Decision (Unanimous)	5	3:00
1991-11-26	Win	(Thailand) Namkabuan Nongkeepahuyuth	Onesongchai, Lumpinee Stadium	Bangkok, Thailand	Decision (Unanimous)	5	3:00
1991-10-25	Win	(Thailand) Jongsanan Fairtex	Yodmuaylok, Lumpinee Stadium	Bangkok, Thailand	Decision (Unanimous)	5	3:00
1991-09-03	Win	(Thailand) Cherry Sor.Wanich	Onesongchai, Lumpinee Stadium	Bangkok, Thailand	Decision (Unanimous)	5	3:00
1991-08-06	Win	(Thailand) Petchdam Sor.Bodin	Onesongchai, Lumpinee Stadium	Bangkok, Thailand	KO (Right straight)	1	
Wins 1 million baht side-bet.
1991-07-02	Win	(Thailand) Jaroenthong Kiatbanchong	Yodmuaylok, Lumpinee Stadium	Bangkok, Thailand	Decision (Unanimous)	5	3:00
1991-06-14	Win	(Thailand) Superlek Sornisaan	Onesongchai, Lumpinee Stadium	Bangkok, Thailand	Decision (Unanimous)	5	3:00
Wins the vacant Lumpinee Stadium Super Bantamweight (122 lbs) title.
1991-04-30	Loss	(Thailand) Namkabuan Nongkeepahuyuth	Onesongchai + Por.Pongsawang, Lumpinee Stadium	Bangkok, Thailand	Decision (Unanimous)	5	3:00
1991-04-05	Win	(Thailand) Samranthong Kiatbanchong	Onesongchai, Lumpinee Stadium	Bangkok, Thailand	TKO	1	1:30
1991-03-05	Loss	(Thailand) Oley Kiatoneway	Onesongchai, Lumpinee Stadium	Bangkok, Thailand	Decision (Unanimous)	5	3:00
1991-01-21	Win	(Thailand) Oley Kiatoneway	Kiatsingnoi, Rajadamnern Stadium	Bangkok, Thailand	Decision (Unanimous)	5	3:00
Wins the 600,000 baht side-bet.
1990-12-18	Win	(Thailand) Superlek Chor.Sawat	Onesongchai, Lumpinee Stadium	Bangkok, Thailand	TKO (Doctor stoppage)	3	
1990-11-20	Win	(Thailand) Dokmaipa Por.Pongsawang	Onesongchai, Lumpinee Stadium	Bangkok, Thailand	Decision	5	3:00
1990-10-30	Win	(Thailand) Namkabuan Nongkeepahuyuth	Onesongchai, Lumpinee Stadium	Bangkok, Thailand	KO (Left Hook)	1	0:33
1990-08-07	Loss	(Thailand) Superlek Chor.Sawat	Dao Rung + Onesongchai, Lumpinee Stadium	Bangkok, Thailand	Decision (Unanimous)	5	3:00
For the vacant Lumpinee Stadium Super Bantamweight (122 lbs) title.
1990-07-10	Win	(Thailand) Rainbow Sor.Prantalay	Onesongchai, Lumpinee Stadium	Bangkok, Thailand	KO (Left uppercut)	1	
1990-06-08	Loss	(Thailand) Kangwannoi Or.Sribualoi	Onesongchai, Lumpinee Stadium	Bangkok, Thailand	Decision (Unanimous)	5	
1990-05-15	Win	(Thailand) Langsuan Panyuthaphum	Onesongchai, Lumpinee Stadium	Bangkok, Thailand	Decision (Unanimous)	5	
1990-03-30	Win	(Thailand) Detduang Por.Pongsawang	Onesongchai, Lumpinee Stadium	Bangkok, Thailand	Decision (Unanimous)	5	3:00
1990-03-02	Win	(Thailand) Yodpetch Sor.Jitpattana	Wanmuay Jor.Por.Ror 7 + Petchyindee, Lumpinee Stadium	Bangkok, Thailand	Decision (Unanimous)	5	3:00
1990-01-19	Loss	(Thailand) Boonlong Sor.Thanikul	Yodmuaylok, Lumpinee Stadium	Bangkok, Thailand	Decision (Unanimous)	5	3:00
1989-10-06	NC	(Thailand) Superlek Chor.Sawat	Yodmuaylok, Lumpinee Stadium	Bangkok, Thailand	Dismissal	5	
Stripped of the Lumpinee Stadium Super Bantamweight (122 lbs) title. The referee judged that the fighters weren't fighting up to their abilities.
1989-08-29	Win	(Thailand) Noppadet Narumon	Onesongchai, Lumpinee Stadium	Bangkok, Thailand	TKO (Punches)	2	
1989-07-25	Win	(Thailand) Kaonar Sor.Kettalingchan	Onesongchai, Lumpinee Stadium	Bangkok, Thailand	Decision (Unanimous)	5	3:00
Defends the Lumpinee Stadium Super Bantamweight (122 lbs) title.
1989-06-30	Loss	(Thailand) Noppadet Narumon	Petchyindee, Lumpinee Stadium	Bangkok, Thailand	Decision (Unanimous)	5	
1989-05-10	Win	(Thailand) Samart Payakaroon	Yodmuaylok, Lumpinee Stadium	Bangkok, Thailand	Decision (Unanimous)	5	3:00
1989-01-31	Win	(Thailand) Kongtoranee Payakaroon	Onesongchai, Lumpinee Stadium	Bangkok, Thailand	Decision (Unanimous)	5	3:00
1989-01-06	Win	(Thailand) Samransak Muangsurin	Onesongchai, Lumpinee Stadium	Bangkok, Thailand	Decision (Unanimous)	5	3:00
1988-11-25	Win	(Thailand) Panomtuanlek Hapalang	Onesongchai, Lumpinee Stadium	Bangkok, Thailand	TKO (Doctor stoppage)	2	
Wins the Lumpinee Stadium Super Bantamweight (122 lbs) title.
1988-10-11	Win	(Thailand) Chamuekpet Hapalang	Onesongchai, Lumpinee Stadium	Bangkok, Thailand	Decision (Unanimous)	5	3:00
1988-09-09	Win	(Thailand) Langsuan Panyuthaphum	Onesongchai, Lumpinee Stadium	Bangkok, Thailand	TKO (Punches)	2	
1988-07-08	Win	(Thailand) Sanguannoi Sor.Rungroj	Onesongchai, Lumpinee Stadium	Bangkok, Thailand	KO (Knees)	2	
1988-05-27	Win	(Thailand) Khunpol Chor.Rojanchai	Onesongchai, Lumpinee Stadium	Bangkok, Thailand	Decision (Unanimous)	5	3:00
1988-05-02	Win	(Thailand) Khunpol Chor.Rojanchai	Lumpinee Stadium	Bangkok, Thailand	Decision	5	3:00
1988-03-25	Loss	(Thailand) Paruhatlek Sitchunthong	Lumpinee Stadium	Bangkok, Thailand	Decision	5	3:00
1988-03-04	Win	(Thailand) Audnoi Lukprabat	Lumpinee Stadium	Bangkok, Thailand	Decision	5	3:00
1988-01-26	Loss	(Thailand) Dokmaipa Por.Pongsawang	Onesongchai, Lumpinee Stadium	Bangkok, Thailand	Decision (Unanimous)	5	3:00
For the Lumpinee Stadium Flyweight (112 lbs) title.
1987-11-27	Win	(Thailand) Dokmaipa Por.Pongsawang	Lumpinee Stadium	Bangkok, Thailand	KO (Punches)	2	
1987-10-27	Loss	(Thailand) Langsuan Panyuthaphum	Onesongchai, Lumpinee Stadium	Bangkok, Thailand	Decision	5	3:00
For Muay Thai World Flyweight (112 lbs) title.
1987-07-24	Win	(Thailand) Jaroenthong Kiatbanchong		Bangkok, Thailand	KO	2	
1987-06-02	Win	(Thailand) Morrakot Choenyim	Lumpinee Stadium	Bangkok, Thailand	Decision	5	3:00
1987-04-26	Draw	(Thailand) Morrakot Choenyim	Lumpinee Stadium	Bangkok, Thailand	Decision	5	3:00
1987-01-13	NC	(Thailand) Dennuea Denmolee	Onesongchai, Lumpinee Stadium	Bangkok, Thailand	Dismissal	5	
Wangchannoi was dismissed by the referee for not fighting up to his abilities.
1986-12-19	Win	(Thailand) Namphon Nongkeepahuyuth	Huamark Stadium	Bangkok, Thailand	Decision	5	3:00
Wins the Lumpinee Stadium Light Flyweight (108 lbs) title.
1986-12-10	Win	(Thailand) Khaosanit Sor.Ploenchit	Huamark Stadium	Bangkok, Thailand	KO	1	
1986-11-18	Win	(Thailand) Kaopho Sit.Chanyuth	Onesongchai, Lumpinee Stadium	Bangkok, Thailand	KO (Right straight)	1	0:45
1986-10-14	Win	(Thailand) Dennuea Denmolee	Lumpinee Stadium	Bangkok, Thailand	KO	4	
1986-09-12	Loss	(Thailand) Paruhatlek Sitchunthong	Onesongchai, Lumpinee Stadium	Bangkok, Thailand	Decision (Unanimous)	5	3:00
1986-08-22	Win	(Thailand) Namphon Nongkeepahuyuth	Onesongchai, Lumpinee Stadium	Bangkok, Thailand	Decision (Unanimous)	5	3:00
1986-07-29	Loss	(Thailand) Paruhatlek Sitchunthong	Onesongchai, Lumpinee Stadium	Bangkok, Thailand	Decision (Unanimous)	5	3:00
1986-06-27	Win	(Thailand) Jockynoi Na Nongkhae		Bangkok, Thailand	Decision	5	3:00
1986-05-30	Win	(Thailand) Yodmanud Sityodtong	Lumpinee Stadium	Bangkok, Thailand	Decision	5	3:00
1986-05-13	Win	(Thailand) Dejsak Phayaksakda	Lumpinee Stadium	Bangkok, Thailand	Decision	5	3:00
1986-02-25	Loss	(Thailand) Kongsak Sitsamtahan	Lumpinee Stadium	Bangkok, Thailand	Decision	5	3:00
1986-01-18	Win	(Thailand) Kaopho Sit.Chanyuth	Rajadamnern Stadium	Bangkok, Thailand	Decision	5	3:00
1985-12-04	Win	(Thailand) Muangchonnoi Lukprabart	Jatusok, Lumpinee Stadium	Bangkok, Thailand	Decision (Unanimous)	5	3:00
1985-11-05	Draw	(Thailand) Muangchonnoi Lukprabart	Lumpinee Stadium	Bangkok, Thailand	Decision	5	3:00
1985-10-11	Loss	(Thailand) Kaopho Sitchanyuth	Lumpinee Stadium	Bangkok, Thailand	Decision	5	3:00
1985-09-20	Loss	(Thailand) Yodmanud Sityodtong	Lumpinee Stadium	Bangkok, Thailand	Decision	5	3:00
1985-08-27	Win	(Thailand) Khanunlek Hapalang	Lumpinee Stadium	Bangkok, Thailand	Decision	5	3:00
1985-06-22	Loss	(Thailand) Dennuea Denmolee	National Stadium	Bangkok, Thailand	Decision (Unanimous)	5	3:00
For the Lumpinee Stadium Mini Flyweight (105lbs) title.
1985-05-10	Win	(Thailand) Langsuan Panyuthaphum	Lumpinee Stadium	Bangkok, Thailand	Decision	5	3:00
1985-04-02	Loss	(Thailand) Eddie Kiatpayathai	Onesongchai, Lumpinee Stadium	Bangkok, Thailand	KO (Left hook)	3	
1985-03-02	Win	(Thailand) Tik Lukprabat	Lumpinee Stadium	Bangkok, Thailand	KO	3	
1985-02-08	Win	(Thailand) Khaosanit Sor.Ploenchit	Onesongchai, Lumpinee Stadium	Bangkok, Thailand	Decision	5	3:00
1985-01-08	Win	(Thailand) Phikatsuek Sor.Saengthai	Onesongchai, Lumpinee Stadium	Bangkok, Thailand	KO	3	
1984-11-09	Draw	(Thailand) Rungtiwa Sor.Ploenchit	Lumpinee Stadium	Bangkok, Thailand	Decision	5	3:00
Legend: Win Loss Draw/No contest Notes
