= Sak Kaoponlek =

Thai Muay Thai fighter

- Born: Somsak Prachumwong; February 18, 1977 (age 49); Mueang Sisaket, Sisaket, Thailand
- Other names: Kaoponlek Luksuntham
- Nickname: The Black Spider (แมงมุมดำ)
- Nationality: Thai-Italian
- Height: 174 cm (5 ft 9 in)
- Division: Featherweight; Lightweight; Super Lightweight; Welterweight; Super Welterweight
- Style: Muay Thai (Muay Femur)
- Stance: Southpaw
- Years active: c. 1988-2015

Kickboxing record
- Total: 381
- Wins: 341
- By knockout: 100
- Losses: 40

Somsak Prachumwong (born February 18, 1977), known professionally as Sak Kaoponlek or Kaoponglek Luksuratham (Thai: ศักดิ์ ขาวผ่องเล็ก, ขาวผ่องเล็ก ลูกสุรธรรม), is a retired Thai Muay Thai fighter and kickboxer. He is a former Lumpinee Stadium Super Featherweight Champion and the 1995 Sports Writers Association of Thailand Fighter of the Year.

== Biography and career ==
Kaoponlek started training and fighting in Muay Thai when he was 11 years old at home with his father. He then joined the Luksuratum gym in Nakhon Ratchasima and at 13 he debuted on the Bangkok circuit.

On April 11, 2015, he fought in the International Gala "Oktagon" in Milan, Italy.

He retired to train and teach. He is the coach of the European Muay Thai organization Fight1.

== Titles and accomplishments ==
- Lumpinee Stadium
  - Lumpinee Stadium Super Featherweight (130 lbs) Champion
- Kombat League
  - 2009 La Grande Sfida Sui 4 Angoli 8-man Tournament Runner-up
  - 2010 Intercontinental Kombat League Championship (67 kg)
- WMF
  - 2010 WMF World Championship (-69.9 kg)
- MTA Muaythai
  - 2007 M.T.A. World Muaythai Championship (-64 kg)
- WAKO
  - 2007 WAKO World Championship (-64.4 kg)
- Trieste Muaythai
  - 2001 Trieste Muaythai World Championship (63.5 kg)

Awards

- 1995 Sports Writers Association of Thailand Fighter of the Year

== Fight record ==
Muaythai record
341 wins (100 (T)KO's), 40 losses, 0 draws
Date	Result	Opponent	Event	Location	Method	Round	Time
2015-04-11	Win	(Belarus) Dmitry Varats	Oktagon	Assago, Italy	Decision	3	3:00
2014-05-10	Win	(France) Azize Hlali	La Notte dei Campioni	Italy	TKO	2	
2014-04-05	Draw	(Ukraine) Sergey Kulyaba	Oktagon	Milan, Italy	Decision	3	3:00
2013-04-20	Win	(Suriname) Sergio Wielzen	Glory 7: Milan	Milan, Italy	Decision (Unanimous)	3	3:00
2013-03-02	Win	(Italy) Alessio D'Angelo	Giorgio Petrosyan vs Ole Laursen	Trieste, Italy	KO (Knees)	3	
2013-02-14	Win	(France) Mehdi Zatout	Best Of Siam 3	Paris, France	Decision	3	3:00
2012-11-24	Win	(France) Crice Boussoukou	Thai Boxe Mania	Turin, Italy	Decision (Unanimous)	3	3:00
2012-07-28	Win	(France) Elias Aharram	Le Choc des Gladiateurs XI	Le Lavandou, France	Decision	3	3:00
2011-12-17	Win	(France) Crice Boussoukou	A1 WCC	La Tour-de-Salvagny, France	KO	2	
2011-11-26	Win	(Slovakia) Martin Sily	Iron Fighter	Zoppola, Italy	KO (Right elbow)	1	
2011-10-08	Win	(France) Charles François	Muaythai Premier League: Round 2	Padua, Italy	TKO (cut)	3	
2011-06-04	Win	(Italy) Alessio D'Angelo	Thailand Invasion	Tivoli, Italy	TKO	2	
2011-05-21	Win	(Italy) Corrado Zanchi	La Notte Dei Campioni	Seregno, Italy	Decision	3	3:00
2011-05-21	Win	(France) Morgan Adrar	La Notte Dei Campioni	Seregno, Italy	TKO (Doctor Stoppage)	2	
2011-03-13	Win	(Spain) David Calvo	Armados y Peligrosos VI	Barcelona, Spain	KO (Right elbow)	2	
2011-02-11	Win	(France) Elias Aharram	Les Rois des Rings III	Ludres, France	Decision	5	3:00
2011-01-29	Win	(Belarus) Andrei Kulebin	Thai Boxe Mania	Turin, Italy	Decision	5	3:00
2010-12-04	Win	(France) Frédéric Diaz	International Fight Show	Loano, Italy	KO (Right hook)	1	
2010-12-04	Win	(Italy) Claudio Amoruso	International Fight Show	Loano, Italy	TKO (Referee Stoppage)	2	
2010-09-11	Win	(France) Charles François	Iron Fighter	Pordenone, Italy	Decision	5	3:00
Wins the Intercontinental Kombat League title (-67kg).
2010-07-31	Win	(Italy) Mauro Serra	Kickboxer's Night 2010	Portoscuso, Italy	TKO (Knees)	4	
2010-05-01	Win	(Italy) Elia Filippini	Onesongchai Muay Thai	Rimini, Italy	TKO (Right Elbow)	3	
Wins the WMF World Championship (-69.9kg).
2010-01-30	Loss	(Thailand) Ekapon Ettapong	Thai Boxe Mania	Turin, Italy	KO	2	
For the WKN Intercontinental -66.7kg title.
2009-12-06	Win	(France) Marc Hamann	International Fight Show	Italy	TKO		
2009-11-20	Win	(France) Sidi Diallo	Ring Rules	Italy	KO		
2009-06-20	Win	(United Kingdom) Michael Dicks	Lignano Sabbiadoro	Italy	Decision	5	3:00
2009-05-02	Loss	(Thailand) Nopparat Keatkhamtorn	La Grande Sfida Sui 4 Angoli, Final	Rimini, Italy	TKO (Exhaustion)	2	
For the Kombat League 2009 La Grande Sfida Sui 4 Angoli Tournament title.
2009-05-02	Win	(Morocco) Jaad El Byari	La Grande Sfida Sui 4 Angoli, Semi Final	Rimini, Italy	TKO		
2009-05-02	Win	(Spain) Abraham Roqueñi	La Grande Sfida Sui 4 Angoli, Quarter Final	Rimini, Italy	Decision	3	3:00
2009-03-07	Win	(Italy) Saro Presti	Contender Asia : Selezione Italia, Final	Modena, Italy	Decision	3	3:00
2009-03-07	Win	(Italy) Hicham Betaini	Contender Asia : Selezione Italia, Semi Final	Modena, Italy	KO	1	
2009-03-07	Win	(Netherlands) Danial Sharifi	Contender Asia : Selezione Italia, Quarter Final	Modena, Italy	KO	1	
2009-01-31	Loss	(Thailand) Imwiset Pornarai	Campionato Mondiale Thai Boxe & K-1 Rules	Turin, Italy	Decision	5	3:00
For the WKN Intercontinental -66.7kg title.
2008-12-06	Win	(Netherlands) Anis Kaabouri	Memorial Mimmo Polizzano	Loano, Italy	KO (Low kick)	2	
2008-05-10	Loss	(Netherlands) Marvin Sansaar	Italian Extreme VI	Modena, Italy	TKO (Leg injury)	2	
2007-11-24	Win	(Netherlands) Jimmy Eimers	Janus Fight Night	Padua, Italy	Decision	5	3:00
2007-07-27	Win	(United Kingdom) Kieran Keddle	Alessandro Gotti Promotion	Abano Terme, Italy	Decision	5	3:00
2007-06-09	Win	(France) Mickaël Piscitello	La Nuit des Challenges 4	Lyon, France	TKO (Referee Stoppage)	2	
2007-05-26	Win	(Austria) Sasa Jovanovic	Thai Boxe Abano Gran Prix	Abano Terme, Italy	Decision	5	3:00
2007-05-12	Win	(Netherlands) Redouan Edady	Kickboxing Superstar	Milan, Italy	Decision	5	3:00
Wins the WAKO World title (-64.4 kg).
2007-04-06	Win	(France) Fabio Pinca	Muay Thai: Kaoponlek VS Liam HARRISON	Italy	Decision	5	3:00
Wins the M.T.A. World Muaythai title (-64 kg).
2006-11-04	Loss	(France) Wilfried Montagne	20 Ans Du Lumpini	Saint-Denis, France	Decision	5	3:00
2006-06-03	Loss	(France) Abdallah Mabel	La Nuit des Challenges 3	Lyon, France	KO	3	
2006-06-02	Win	(Slovakia) Rodolf Durica	The King Of Kings II	Milan, Italy	TKO (Doctor Stoppage)		
2005-11-19	Loss	(Netherlands) Jerry Morris	Janus Fight Night	Padua, Italy	TKO (Injury)	2	
2005-11-19	Win	(Ukraine) Petro Nakonechny	Janus Fight Night	Padua, Italy	Decision	4	3:00
2005-11-05	Win	(United Kingdom) Phil Mcalpine		Trieste, Italy	TKO	2	
2005-10-22	Win	(France) Farid Khider	La Nuit des Superfights II	Villebon, France	Decision	5	3:00
2005-06-10	Win	(United Kingdom) Frankie Hadders	Gala Mondiale	Fiume Veneto, Italy	TKO	4	
2004-11-27	Win	(Japan) Satoshi Kobayashi		Italy	TKO (Doctor Stoppage)	2	
2004-11-06	Win	(France) Johny Tancray	Trieste - Francia vs Italia	Trieste, Italy	Decision	5	3:00
Wins the M.T.A. World Muaythai title (-64 kg).
2004-07-17	Win	(France) Ali Kanfouah	Trieste - Francia vs Italia	Trieste, Italy	KO	2	
2004-05-08	Win	(Italy) Diego Calzolari	Trieste	Trieste, Italy	KO	3	
2003-04-18	Loss	(France) Jean-Charles Skarbowsky	Grand tournoi des Moyens	Paris, France	KO		
2003-03-03	Loss	(France) Jean-Charles Skarbowsky	Rajadamnern Stadium	Bangkok, Thailand	KO (Right uppercut)	3	
2002-07-07	Win	(France) Jean-Charles Skarbowsky	ISKA Kickboxing, Palais Omnisport Bercy	Paris, France	KO (Right highkick)	4	
2002-06-08	Win	(Switzerland) Dado Imirici	Les Titans du III ème Millénaire	Trieste, Italy	KO	2	
2001-11-22	Win	(France) Jean-Charles Skarbowsky	Trieste	Trieste, Italy	KO (Elbow)	4	
Wins the Trieste Muaythai World title (63.5 kg).
2001-09-05	Loss	(Thailand) Attachai Chor.Wiratchai	Onesongchai, Rajadamnern Stadium	Bangkok, Thailand	Decision	5	3:00
2000-04-25	Loss	(Thailand) Twaeesap Sitsaengarun	Lumpinee Stadium	Bangkok, Thailand	Decision	5	3:00
2000-03-17	Win	(Thailand) Chokdee Por.Pramuk	Lumpinee Stadium	Bangkok, Thailand	Decision	5	3:00
2000-01-29	Loss	(Thailand) Khunsuk Sitporamet	Lumpinee Stadium	Bangkok, Thailand	Decision	5	3:00
1999-09-11	Win	(Thailand) Buatong Sitphutthapim	Lumpinee Stadium	Bangkok, Thailand	KO (Elbow)	3	
1998-10-31	Loss	(Thailand) Sangtiennoi Sor.Rungroj	Lumpinee Stadium	Bangkok, Thailand	Decision	5	3:00
1998-02-27	Loss	(Thailand) Lamnamoon Sor.Sumalee	Lumpinee Stadium	Bangkok, Thailand	TKO		
1997-	Win	(Thailand) Jompoplek Sor Sumalee		Chachoengsao, Thailand	Decision	5	3:00
1996-	Loss	(Thailand) Kriengkrai Sor.Worapin	Lumpinee Stadium	Bangkok, Thailand	Decision	5	3:00
1997-06-01	Loss	(Thailand) Therdkiat Sitthepitak	Paet Riew International Stadium	Chachoengsao province, Thailand	Decision	5	3:00
For the vacant IMTC World Super Lightweight (140 lbs) title.
1997-02-09	Win	(Thailand) Orono Por.MuangUbon		Phichit province, Thailand	TKO (Doctor stoppage)	4	
1997-01-18	Win	(Thailand) Keng Singnakhonkui	Lumpinee Stadium	Bangkok, Thailand	Decision	5	3:00
1996-12-17	Win	(Thailand) Rattanachai Wor.Walapon	Lumpinee Stadium	Bangkok, Thailand	Decision	5	3:00
1996-11-02	Win	(Thailand) Den Muangsurin	Muay Thai Khanomtom, Lumpinee Stadium	Bangkok, Thailand	Decision	5	3:00
1996-10-12	Win	(Thailand) Prabseuklek Sitnarong	Lumpinee Stadium	Bangkok, Thailand	Decision	5	3:00
1996-08-23	Loss	(Thailand) Samkor Chor.Rathchatasupak	Lumpinee Stadium	Bangkok, Thailand	Decision	5	3:00
1996-	Loss	(Thailand) Keng Singnakhonkui	Lumpinee Stadium	Bangkok, Thailand	TKO (Elbow)	4	
1996-05-21	Win	(Thailand) Therdkiat Sitthepitak	Lumpinee Stadium	Bangkok, Thailand	KO (Elbow)	4	
1996-03-18	Win	(Thailand) Lamnamoon Sor.Sumalee	Lumpinee Stadium	Bangkok, Thailand	TKO (Elbow)	4	
1996-02-27	Win	(Thailand) Den Muangsurin	Lumpinee Stadium	Bangkok, Thailand	Decision	5	3:00
1996-01-26	Loss	(Thailand) Mathee Jadeepitak	Lumpinee Stadium	Bangkok, Thailand	Decision	5	3:00
1995-12-30	Win	(Thailand) Chatchai Paiseetong	Lumpinee Stadium	Bangkok, Thailand	Decision	5	3:00
1995-11-18	Win	(Thailand) Cherry Sor Wanich		Bangkok, Thailand	Decision	5	3:00
1995-09-05	Win	(Thailand) Hansuk Prasathinpanomrung	Lumpinee Stadium	Bangkok, Thailand	KO	4	
1995-08-04	Win	(Thailand) Theerapong Sitarayut	Lumpinee Stadium	Bangkok, Thailand	Decision	5	3:00
1995-06-27	Win	(Thailand) Wangchannoi Sor.Palangchai	Lumpinee Stadium	Bangkok, Thailand	Decision	5	3:00
1995-05-19	Win	(Thailand) Thammawit Sakhomsin		Bangkok, Thailand	Decision	5	3:00
1995-04-25	Win	(Thailand) Thanooin Chor.Chuchart	Lumpinee Stadium	Bangkok, Thailand	Decision	5	3:00
1995-02-27	Loss	(Thailand) Thanongsak Sor.Prantalay	Rajadamnern Stadium	Bangkok, Thailand	Decision	5	3:00
1995-01-17	Loss	(Thailand) Keng Singnakhonkui	Lumpinee Stadium	Bangkok, Thailand	KO	1	
1995-01-07	Win	(Thailand) Pichitsak Saksaengmanee	Lumpinee Stadium	Bangkok, Thailand	Decision	5	3:00
1994-09-09	Win	(Thailand) Putphatlek Sor Chalermchai	Lumpinee Stadium	Bangkok, Thailand	TKO (Referee Stoppage)	4	
1994-08-16	Win	(Thailand) Boontawarn Sithuakaew	Lumpinee Stadium	Bangkok, Thailand	Decision	5	3:00
1994-	Loss	(Thailand) Meechok Sor.Ploenchit	Lumpinee Stadium	Bangkok, Thailand	Decision	5	3:00
1994-04-29	Loss	(Thailand) Saengmorakot Sor.Ploenchit	Lumpinee Stadium	Bangkok, Thailand	Decision	5	3:00
1994-03-25	Loss	(Thailand) Yokthai Sithoar	Lumpinee Stadium	Bangkok, Thailand	KO (Punches)	2	
1994-02-15	Win	(Thailand) Kruekchai Kaewsamrit	Lumpinee Stadium	Bangkok, Thailand	Decision	5	3:00
1993-12-17	Loss	(Thailand) Rattanachai Wor.Walapon	Lumpinee Stadium	Bangkok, Thailand	Decision	5	3:00
Legend: Win Loss Draw/No contest Notes
