= Satoshi Iida =

Japanese boxer (born 1969)

Personal information
- Nationality: (Japan) Japanese
- Born: 飯田覚士; August 11, 1969 (age 57) Nagoya, Japan
- Height: 5 ft 5 in (165 cm)
- Weight: Super flyweight

Boxing career
- Reach: 65 in (166 cm)
- Stance: Southpaw

Boxing record
- Total fights: 28
- Wins: 25
- Win by KO: 11
- Losses: 2
- Draws: 1
- No contests: 0

Satoshi Iida (飯田覚士 Iida Satoshi, born August 11, 1969) is a Japanese professional boxer from Nagoya, Aichi, Japan. Iida won the WBA super flyweight championship of the world in 1997 when he defeated Thai champion Yokthai Sithoar via a 12th-round unanimous decision.

== See also ==
- List of super-flyweight boxing champions
- List of Japanese boxing world champions
- Boxing in Japan

Achievements
Preceded by Yokthai Sithoar	WBA super flyweight Champion; December 23, 1997 – December 23, 1998	Succeeded by Jesús Kiki Rojas
