= Sor Ploenchit =

Defunct Muay Thai training gym in Bangkok

Sor Ploenchit (Thai: ส.เพลินจิต) was a Muay Thai training gym in Bangkok, founded by Sathien Sathirasut in 1981. It became widely known when Kaensak Sor.Ploenjit became Rajadamnern and Lumpini champion in 1989, and with Saen Sor Ploenchit becoming WBA world champion in 1994. The gym closed down in 2014.

Boxers affiliated with the gym include:

- Kaensak Sor.Ploenjit
- Khem Sor Ploenchit, later known as Kem Sitsongpeenong
- Manasak Sor Ploenchit
- Saen Sor Ploenchit
- Suriya Sor Ploenchit, ring name of Suriya Prasathinphimai
- Meechok Sor.Ploenchit
