= Yokthai Sithoar =

Thai former professional Muay Thai fighter and boxer (born 1974)

- Born: Manit Klinmee; December 25, 1974 (age 51); Bang Lamung, Chonburi, Thailand
- Native name: มานิตย์ กลิ่นมี
- Other names: Yokthai Sit Or
- Nickname: The Hell Cyclone Fist (ไอ้หมัดไซโคลนนรก); Tunk (ตึ๋ง, personal nickname)
- Height: 170 cm (5 ft 7 in)
- Division: Super flyweight (Muay Thai and Boxing); Featherweight (MMA)
- Style: Muay Thai (Muay Mat / Muay Bouk); Boxing; MMA
- Stance: Orthodox
- Team: Onesongchai Boxing Promotion (Muay Thai & professional boxing)
- Trainer: Ismael Salas (professional boxing)

Professional boxing record
- Total: 37
- Wins: 28
- By knockout: 17
- Losses: 6
- By knockout: 2
- Draws: 3
- No contests: 0

Mixed martial arts record
- Total: 1
- Wins: 0
- Losses: 1
- By knockout: 1

Other information
- Notable relatives: Rambaa Somdet (nephew); Tappaya Sit-Or (younger brother); Sudsakorn Sor Klinmee (nephew)
- Boxing record from BoxRec
- Mixed martial arts record from Sherdog

Manit Klinmee (Thai: มานิตย์ กลิ่นมี; born December 25, 1974), known professionally as Yokthai Sithoar (Thai: หยกไทย ศิษย์ อ.), is a Thai former professional Muay Thai fighter and boxer. He is a former Lumpinee Stadium Super Flyweight Champion and also a WBA World Super Flyweight Champion in boxing.

== Biography and career ==
He was born in Chonburi Province, eastern Thailand, along with his brother Tappaya Sit-Or and his nephew Rambaa Somdet. He trained in Muay Thai since childhood, and they later became prominent and successful Muay Thai kickboxers.

Yokthai became a famous Muay Thai fighter under Songchai Rattanasuban's stable. Known for the power of his punches, he often defeated his opponents by knockout. He received the nickname "The Hell Cyclone Fist" for his devastating punching power.

Because his fists were so effective, he was backed by his promoter, Songchai, to turn to a professional boxing career in 1994, along with Pichit Chor Siriwat, in the junior flyweight division, with Cuba's Ismael Salas as a trainer. He had four wins and captured the vacant PABA super flyweight title against a Russian boxer; he won his next five bouts, including three title defenses.

On August 24, 1996, Yokthai challenged for the WBA super flyweight world title against Venezuelan titleholder Alimi Goitia at Kamphaengphet Provincial Stadium, Kamphaeng Phet Province; he won by TKO in the eighth round. He became the second Thai boxer to capture the WBA super flyweight world title after the legendary Khaosai Galaxy.

He would defend his title four times, defeating famous boxers such as Aquiles Guzmán and Jesús "Kiki" Rojas. He later traveled to Japan, where he lost the title to Satoshi Iida, a Japanese boxer and an old rival with whom he had previously fought to a draw, by unanimous decision at the Aichi Prefectural Gymnasium in Nagoya on December 23, 1997. He returned to challenge for a world title again on April 23, 2000, against the new titleholder Hideki Todaka at Rainbow Hall, Nagoya; he was defeated by TKO in the 11th round.

He continued to fight several more times but was not as successful. He retired from professional boxing in mid-2004.

After retiring, Yokthai moved to Japan to work as a Muay Thai trainer in Sendai, Miyagi Prefecture, where he had his own Muay Thai gym. While in Japan, he returned to competition in 2008. He married a Japanese MMA fighter, Hikaru Shinohara. Yokthai competed in his lone mixed martial arts match against Shinya Aoki in 2010, where he lost via first-round submission.

== Titles & honours ==
=== Muay Thai ===
- Lumpinee Stadium
  - 1994 Lumpinee Stadium Super Flyweight (115 lbs) Champion

=== Boxing ===
- Pan Asian Boxing Association
  - 1995 PABA Flyweight (112 lbs) Champion
    - Three successful title defenses
- World Boxing Association
  - 1996 WBA World Super Flyweight (115 lbs) Champion
    - Four successful title defenses

== Boxing record ==
37 fights	28 wins	6 losses
By knockout	17	2
By decision	11	4
Draws	3	

No.	Result	Record	Opponent	Type	Round, time	Date	Location	Notes
37	Loss	28-6-3	(Philippines) Jerome Arsolon	TKO	3	24 Jun 2004	Sawi District, Thailand	
36	Loss	28-5-3	(Japan) Shoji Kimura	SD	10	23 May 2004	Sports Center, Kitami, Japan	
35	Loss	28-4-3	(Japan) Manabu Fukushima	UD	10	21 Feb 2004	Korakuen Hall, Kitami, Japan	
34	Draw	28-3-3	(Japan) Manabu Fukushima	MD	10	6 Dec 2003	Korakuen Hall, Kitami, Japan	
33	Draw	28-3-2	(Japan) Osamu Sato	SD	10	21 Jul 2003	Korakuen Hall, Kitami, Japan	
32	Win	28-3-1	(Japan) Akihiko Nago	UD	10	25 Apr 2003	Korakuen Hall, Kitami, Japan	
31	Win	27-3-1	(Philippines) Joel Junio	KO	4 (10)	5 Dec 2002	Royal Square, Bangkok, Thailand	
30	Win	26-3-1	(Philippines) Edwin Gastador	KO	2 (10)	21 Feb 2002	Dan Khun Thot District, Thailand	
29	Win	25-3-1	(Philippines) Flash Eraham	KO	10	5 Dec 2001	Bangkok, Thailand	
28	Win	24-3-1	(Philippines) Lee Escobido	KO	9 (10)	9 Nov 2001	Nonthaburi, Thailand	
27	Loss	23-3-1	(Japan) Katsushige Kawashima	UD	10	27 Aug 2001	Bunka Gym, Yokohama, Japan	
26	Loss	23-2-1	(Japan) Hideki Todaka	TKO	11 (12)	23 Apr 2000	Nippon Gaishi Hall, Nagoya, Japan	For the WBA World Super Flyweight Title
25	Win	23-1-1	(Philippines) Marlon Arlos	PTS	8	20 Feb 2000	Lopburi, Thailand	
24	Win	22-1-1	(Indonesia) Agus Ekajaya	TKO	4 (?)	5 Feb 2000	Mall Department Store, Bangkok, Thailand	
23	Win	21-1-1	(Thailand) Kenny Kenling	KO	5 (?)	28 Nov 1999	Pattaya, Thailand	
22	Win	20-1-1	(Philippines) Ricky Sales	KO	2 (?)	26 Sep 1999	Bangkok, Thailand	
21	Win	19-1-1	(Philippines) William Acoyong	KO	3 (?)	20 Jun 1999	Bangkok, Thailand	
20	Win	18-1-1	(Philippines) Felix Marfa	PTS	6	20 Feb 1999	Chaweng Beach Arena, Ko Samui, Thailand	
19	Win	17-1-1	(Thailand) Lerthai Maimuangkorn	PTS	10	29 Sep 1998	Bangkok, Thailand	
18	Win	16-1-1	(Philippines) Allan Morre	TKO	5 (10)	31 Jul 1998	Satun, Thailand	
17	Win	15-1-1	(Philippines) Marlon Arlos	PTS	10	16 Apr 1998	Prachuap Khiri Khan, Thailand	
16	Loss	14-1-1	(Japan) Satoshi Iida	UD	12	23 Dec 1997	Aichi Prefectural Gymnasium, Nagoya, Japan	Loses the WBA World Super Flyweight Title
15	Win	14-0-1	(Venezuela) Jesus Rojas	UD	12	8 Aug 1997	Emerald Hotel, Bangkok, Thailand	Defends the WBA World Super Flyweight Title
14	Draw	13-0-1	(Japan) Satoshi Iida	MD	12	29 Apr 1997	Aichi Prefectural Gymnasium, Nagoya, Japan	Defends the WBA World Super Flyweight Title
13	Win	13-0-0	(Venezuela) Aquiles Guzman	UD	12	1 Mar 1997	Chachoengsao Town Municipality Stadium, Chachoengsao, Thailand	Defends the WBA World Super Flyweight Title
12	Win	12-0-0	(Indonesia) Jack Siahaya	KO	2 (12)	10 Oct 1996	Phichit Provincial Stadium, Phichit Province, Thailand	Defends the WBA World Super Flyweight Title
11	Win	11-0-0	(Venezuela) Alimi Goitia	TKO	8 (12)	24 Aug 1996	Provincial Gym, Kamphaeng Phet, Thailand	Wins the WBA World Super Flyweight Title
10	Win	10-0-0	(Mexico) Diego Andrade	UD	12	1 Jun 1996	The Mall Shopping Center Bangkae, Bangkok, Thailand	Defends the PABA Super Flyweight title
9	Win	9-0-0	(Russia) Maxim Pugachev	TKO	8 (12)	7 Apr 1996	Uttaradit, Thailand	Defends the PABA Super Flyweight title
8	Win	8-0-0	(Indonesia) Ippo Gala	PTS	10	28 Jan 1996	Municipal Stadium, Kanchanaburi, Thailand	
7	Win	7-0-0	(Indonesia) Abdi Pohan	TKO	5 (?)	14 Jan 1996	Municipal Hall Grounds, Nonthaburi, Thailand	
6	Win	6-0-0	(Indonesia) Agus Ekajaya	TKO	3 (?)	7 Oct 1995	Bangkok, Thailand	Defends the PABA Super Flyweight title
5	Win	5-0-0	(Russia) Ilshat Tukhvatullin	TKO	10 (12)	5 Aug 1995	Channel 5 Studios, Bangkok, Thailand	Wins the vacant PABA Super Flyweight title
4	Win	4-0-0	(Panama) Juan Antonio Torres	PTS	12	7 May 1995	Ank-Seng Samakee Stadium, Songkhla, Thailand	
3	Win	3-0-0	(Indonesia) Ippo Gala	PTS	10	5 Mar 1995	Bangkok, Thailand	
2	Win	2-0-0	(Philippines) Jun Tonzo	KO	2 (?)	20 Nov 1994	Ha Chieng Plaza, Chiang Rai, Thailand	
1	Win	1-0-0	(Australia) Colin 'Kid' Nelson	KO	3 (?)	9 Oct 1994	Ramkamhaeng University, Bangkok, Thailand	

== Muay Thai record ==
Muay Thai and Kickboxing record
Date	Result	Opponent	Event	Location	Method	Round	Time
2009-07-05	Loss	(Japan) Keichi Nakajima	DEEP☆KICK	Osaka, Japan	KO (Left hook to the body)	2	0:28
2008-11-24	Loss	(Japan) Yuji Takeuchi	MAJKF - Tekken 6	Tokyo, Japan	Decision (Unanimous)	5	3:00
1994-08-27	Win	(Thailand) Nungubon Sitlerchai	Lumpinee Stadium	Bangkok, Thailand	Decision	5	3:00
1994-08-09	Win	(Thailand) Nungubon Sitlerchai	Lumpinee Stadium	Bangkok, Thailand	Decision	5	3:00
1994-07-19	Win	(Thailand) Nongnarong Luksamrong	Lumpinee Stadium	Bangkok, Thailand	KO (Punches)	3	
Wins the Lumpinee Stadium Super Flyweight (115 lbs) title.
1994-06-10	Loss	(Thailand) Nongnarong Luksamrong	Lumpinee Stadium	Bangkok, Thailand	Decision	5	3:00
For the vacant Lumpinee Stadium Super Flyweight (115 lbs) title.
1994-05-03	Win	(Thailand) Lamnamoon Sor.Sumalee	Lumpinee Stadium	Bangkok, Thailand	KO (Punches)	2	
1994-03-25	Win	(Thailand) Kaoponglek Luksuratham	Lumpinee Stadium	Bangkok, Thailand	KO (Punches)	2	
1994-02-15	Win	(Thailand) Saengmorakot Sor.Ploenchit	Lumpinee Stadium	Bangkok, Thailand	TKO	4	
1994-01-28	Loss	(Thailand) Meechok Sor.Ploenchit	Lumpinee Stadium	Bangkok, Thailand	Decision	5	3:00
1994-01-01	Win	(Thailand) Rittidet Kierdpayak	Lumpinee Stadium	Bangkok, Thailand	TKO (Punches)	3	
1993-11-06	Loss	(Thailand) Denaree Dechphonthip	Lumpinee Stadium	Bangkok, Thailand	Decision	5	3:00
1993-07-03	Loss	(Thailand) Pichai Wor.Walapon	Lumpinee Stadium	Bangkok, Thailand	Decision	5	3:00
1993-05-15	Loss	(Thailand) Noknoi Or.Bowin	Lumpinee Stadium	Bangkok, Thailand	Decision	5	3:00
1993-05-15	Loss	(Thailand) Charoenwit Kiatbanchong	Lumpinee Stadium	Bangkok, Thailand	Decision	5	3:00
1992-11-20	Loss	(Thailand) Dokmaifai Tor.Sitthichai	Lumpinee Stadium	Bangkok, Thailand	Decision	5	3:00
1992-10-31	Loss	(Thailand) Kompayak Singmanee	Lumpinee Stadium	Bangkok, Thailand	Decision	5	3:00
For the Lumpinee Stadium Mini Flyweight (105 lbs) title.
1992-05-29	Win	(Thailand) Pepsi Sor.Somkwan	Lumpinee Stadium	Bangkok, Thailand	KO	2	
1991-11-16	Loss	(Thailand) Hansuk Prasathinpanomrung	Lumpinee Stadium	Bangkok, Thailand	Decision	5	3:00
1991-08-06	Loss	(Thailand) Thanongsak Sor.Prantalay	Lumpinee Stadium	Bangkok, Thailand	Decision	5	3:00
1991-01-25	Loss	(Thailand) Jompoplek Sor.Sumalee	Onesongchai, Lumpinee Stadium	Bangkok, Thailand	Decision	5	3:00
1990-10-12	Win	(Thailand) Kehars Chuchokchai	Lumpinee Stadium	Bangkok, Thailand	Decision	5	3:00
1990-07-10	Win	(Thailand) Rungrawee Sakwichian	Lumpinee Stadium	Bangkok, Thailand	Decision	5	3:00
1990-06-19	Win	(Thailand) Samarnchai Singkhiri	Lumpinee Stadium	Bangkok, Thailand	Decision	5	3:00
Legend: Win Loss Draw/No contest Notes

== Mixed martial arts record ==
Professional record breakdown
1 match	0 wins	1 loss
By knockout	0	0
By submission	0	1
By decision	0	0
No contests	0	

Res.	Record	Opponent	Method	Event	Date	Round	Time	Location	Notes
Loss	0–1	Shinya Aoki	Submission (keylock)	DEEP: 50 Impact	October 24, 2010	1	1:00	Tokyo, Japan	

Achievements
Preceded by Alimi Goitia	WBA Super Flyweight Champion; August 24, 1996 – December 23, 1997	Succeeded by Satoshi Iida
