= Hansuk Prasathinpanomrung =

Thai former professional Muay Thai fighter

- Born: Wirapon Karnthang; 29 January 1975 (age 51); Nakhon Ratchasima, Nakhon Ratchasima, Thailand
- Native name: หาญศึก ปราสาทหินพนมรุ้ง
- Other names: Hansuk Wor.Petchpun
- Nickname: The Wild Horse (ไอ้ม้าพยศ)
- Height: 169 cm (5 ft 7 in)
- Division: Super Bantamweight
- Style: Muay Thai (Muay Bouk)
- Stance: Orthodox
- Team: Nongkee Pahuyuth
- Trainer: Pramote Haymook

Kickboxing record
- Total: 150
- Wins: 120
- By knockout: 20
- Losses: 30

Other information
- Occupation: Muay Thai trainer
- Children: 2

Wirapon Karnthang (born January 29, 1975), known professionally as Hansuk Prasathinpanomrung (Thai: หาญศึก ปราสาทหินพนมรุ้ง), is a Thai former professional Muay Thai fighter. He is a former Lumpinee Stadium Super Bantamweight Champion who was active during the 1980s and 1990s.

== Biography and career ==
Hansuk, inspired by a friend, began training and fighting in Muay Thai at 15 years old. He trained at the Nongkee Pahuyuth gym alongside fighters such as Namkabuan Nongkeepahuyuth, Therdkiat Sitthepitak, and Namphon Nongkeepahuyuth for 10 years.

He fought during the Golden Era of Muay Thai against many notable fighters including Karuhat Sor.Supawan, Lamnamoon Sor.Sumalee, Kaensak Sor.Ploenjit, Wangchannoi Sor.Palangchai, Hippy Singmanee, Chatchai Paiseetong, Nungubon Sitlerchai, Jaroensap Kiatbanchong, Mathee Jadeepitak, Sak Kaoponlek, and Meechok Sor.Ploenchit. The largest purse of his career was 220,000 baht, making him one of the few fighters who crossed the 200,000 baht threshold.

After retiring Hansuk became a trainer in multiple gyms including the Wor.Petchpoon.

== Titles and honours ==
- Lumpinee Stadium
  - 1994 Lumpinee Stadium Super Bantamweight (122 lbs) Champion
  - 1996 Lumpinee Stadium Fight of the Year (vs Nungubon Sitlerchai on July 26)

== Fight record ==
Muay Thai Record (Incomplete)
Date	Result	Opponent	Event	Location	Method	Round	Time
2012-11-23	Win	(France) Brandon Vieira	KF1 World Championship	Hong Kong	Decision	3	3:00
2007-05-08	Loss	(Netherlands) Jimmy Eimers	Slamm!!: Nederland VS Thailand 3	Almere, Netherlands	TKO (Right cross)	2	1:36
2006-10-01	Loss	(Netherlands) Hussein Abdelhadi	Slamm!!: Nederland VS Thailand 2	Almere, Netherlands	KO (Knee to the head)	3	
2000-11-24	Loss	(Thailand) Khunpinit Kiattawan	Lumpinee Stadium	Bangkok, Thailand	Decision	5	3:00
1997-01-	Loss	(Thailand) Lamnamoon Sor.Sumalee	Lumpinee Stadium	Bangkok, Thailand	Decision	5	3:00
1996-08-23	Loss	(Thailand) Nungubon Sitlerchai	Lumpinee Stadium	Bangkok, Thailand	Decision	5	3:00
1996-07-26	Loss	(Thailand) Nungubon Sitlerchai	Lumpinee Stadium	Bangkok, Thailand	Decision	5	3:00
1996-05-28	Win	(Thailand) Dao Udon Sor.Suchart	Lumpinee Stadium	Bangkok, Thailand	KO (High kick)	4	
1996-02-12	Win	(Thailand) Thaphisut Sor.Maliwan	Lumpinee Stadium	Bangkok, Thailand	Decision	5	3:00
1996-01-16	Win	(Thailand) Prabsuklek Sitnarong	Lumpinee Stadium	Bangkok, Thailand	Decision	5	3:00
1995-12-09	Win	(Thailand) Phichit Saksangmanee		Thailand	Decision	5	3:00
1995-11-02	Loss	(Thailand) Dokmaifai Tor.Sittichai	Rajadamnern Stadium	Bangkok, Thailand	Decision	5	3:00
1995-09-05	Loss	(Thailand) Kaoponglek Luksuratham	Lumpinee Stadium	Bangkok, Thailand	KO	4	
1995-06-07	Loss	(Thailand) Oley Kiatoneway	Rajadamnern Stadium	Bangkok, Thailand	KO (Left hook)	2	
1994-11-15	Loss	(Thailand) Chatchai Paiseetong	Lumpinee Stadium	Bangkok, Thailand	KO (Head Kick)	3	
1994-10-28	Loss	(Thailand) Meechok Sor.Ploenchit	Lumpinee Stadium	Bangkok, Thailand	Decision	5	3:00
Loses the Lumpinee Stadium Super Bantamweight (122 lbs) title.
1994-09-27	Loss	(Thailand) Kaensak Sor.Ploenjit	Lumpinee Stadium	Bangkok, Thailand	Decision	5	3:00
1994-08-22	Loss	(Thailand) Mathee Jadeepitak	Rajadamnern Stadium	Bangkok, Thailand	Decision	5	3:00
1994-07-29	Win	(Thailand) Wangchannoi Sor.Palangchai	Lumpinee Stadium	Bangkok, Thailand	Decision	5	3:00
Wins the Lumpinee Stadium Super Bantamweight (122 lbs) title.
1994-05-31	Win	(Thailand) Kaensak Sor.Ploenjit	Lumpinee Stadium	Bangkok, Thailand	Decision	5	3:00
1994-01-28	Loss	(Thailand) Lamnamoon Sor.Sumalee	Lumpinee Stadium	Bangkok, Thailand	Decision	5	3:00
1993-12-17	Win	(Thailand) Jompoplek Sor.Sumalee	Lumpinee Stadium	Bangkok, Thailand	Decision	5	3:00
1993-11-29	Loss	(Thailand) Karuhat Sor.Supawan	Rajadamnern Stadium	Bangkok, Thailand	Decision	5	3:00
1993-10-22	Loss	(Thailand) Nungubon Sitlerchai	Lumpinee Stadium	Bangkok, Thailand	Decision	5	3:00
1993-09-17	Win	(Thailand) Jaroensap Kiatbanchong	Lumpinee Stadium	Bangkok, Thailand	Decision	5	3:00
1993-08-31	Win	(Thailand) Charoenwit Kiatbanchong	Lumpinee Stadium	Bangkok, Thailand	Decision	5	3:00
1993-07-30	Loss	(Thailand) Wangchannoi Sor.Palangchai	Lumpinee Stadium	Bangkok, Thailand	Decision	5	3:00
1993-06-25	Win	(Thailand) Kasemlek QualityGym	Lumpinee Stadium	Bangkok, Thailand	KO (Punches)	2	
1993-05-28	Win	(Thailand) Meechok Sor.Ploenchit	Lumpinee Stadium	Bangkok, Thailand	KO (Punches)	2	
1993-04-10	Win	(Thailand) Chanaphet Kratindaeng		Thailand	KO (Knee)	4	
1993-01-02	Win	(Thailand) Chainoi Sit Chunthong	Lumpinee Stadium	Bangkok, Thailand	Decision	5	3:00
1992-10-17	Win	(Thailand) Hippy Singmanee	Lumpinee Stadium	Bangkok, Thailand	Decision	5	3:00
1992-08-22	Win	(Thailand) Rungrat Sakdarun	Lumpinee Stadium	Bangkok, Thailand	Decision	5	3:00
1992-02-01	Win	(Thailand) Wanmongkol Singhakiri	Lumpinee Stadium	Bangkok, Thailand	Decision	5	3:00
1992-01-	Win	(Thailand) Cherry Daengkiatkosin		Thailand	Decision	5	3:00
1991-12-	Win	(Thailand) Dejsakda Sit-Amphon		Thailand	Decision	5	3:00
1991-11-16	Win	(Thailand) Yokthai Sithoar	Lumpinee Stadium	Bangkok, Thailand	Decision	5	3:00
Legend: Win Loss Draw/No contest Notes
