= Kaensak Sor.Ploenjit =

Thai former professional Muay Thai fighter and boxer

- Born: Pongsak Cheawchan; April 8, 1970 (age 56); Phra Pradaeng, Samut Prakan, Thailand
- Native name: พงษ์ศักดิ์ เชี่ยวชาญ
- Other names: Kaensak Taputhai
- Nickname: Two-Time Fighter of the Year (ยอดมวยไทย 2 พ.ศ.)
- Height: 170 cm (5 ft 7 in)
- Division: Flyweight; Super Flyweight; Bantamweight (Boxing & Muay Thai); Super Bantamweight; Junior Featherweight; Featherweight; Lightweight; Super Lightweight
- Style: Muay Thai (Muay Femur)
- Stance: Orthodox
- Team: Taputhai (1970s – 1981); Sor.Ploenjit (1981 – 1996)
- Trainer: Likhit Cheawchan (father); Gimyu Lerkchai (Sor.Ploenjit gym)
- Years active: c. 1980–1996, 2000–2009

Professional boxing record
- Total: 2
- Wins: 1
- By knockout: 1
- Losses: 1

Kickboxing record
- Total: 250
- Wins: 208
- Losses: 40
- Draws: 2

Other information
- Boxing record from BoxRec

Pongsak Cheawchan (Thai: พงษ์ศักดิ์ เชี่ยวชาญ; born April 9, 1970), known professionally as Kaensak Sor.Ploenjit (Thai: แก่นศักดิ์ ส.เพลินจิต), is a Thai former professional Muay Thai fighter and boxer. He is a former Lumpinee Stadium and Rajadamnern Stadium champion at Flyweight, as well as the 1989 and 1990 Sports Writers Association of Thailand Fighter of the Year, who was famous in the 1980s and 1990s. Nicknamed the "Two-Time Fighter of the Year", he is often regarded as one of the greatest and most talented fighters in the history of Muay Thai.

== Biography & career ==
=== Early career ===
Cheawchan was born on April 8, 1970 in Phra Pradaeng district in Samut Prakhan province, Thailand. Although he was disinterested in Muay Thai, his father Likhit Cheawchan forced him to become a fighter like all 4 of his brothers. Likhit, an ex-Muay Thai fighter, trained Kaensak and his siblings. He adopted the ring name of Kaensak Taputhai and had his first fight at the Samrong Stadium. Despite winning the fight for a purse of 200 baht, Kaensak was not happy with fighting, even wearing shorts that were embroidered with the phrase "ผมถูกบังคับ" ("I was forced").

Kaensak's father continued to force him to fight around 50 times out of the Taputhai gym until he was considered a rising star. He was initially a Muay Khao fighter (knee fighter) at this time. In 1981, his father wanted him to join a better Muay Thai gym, hence Kaensak was sent to the prestigious Sor.Ploenjit gym which was owned by Thai millionaire Sathien Sathiansut. At 15-years-old, Kaensak would begin training under the famous Gimyu Lerkchai, the trainer of the various Sor.Ploenjit fighters as well as Lakhin Wassandasit. Kaensak would fight dozens of times in various venues until he won the littleweight championship (80 lbs/36.3 kg) at the Karunniwet Stadium in Chonburi province.

=== Fighting style ===
After training at the Sor.Ploenjit gym, Kaensak became well-rounded and explosive Muay Femur fighter meaning that he was a rope-a-dope fighter with fast and powerful defense. Muay Thai fighter and journalist Sylvie von Duuglas-Ittu, who has trained with dozens of elite golden era fighters including Kaensak, notes that his style was unusual compared to most other fighters of his time. The foundation of Kaensak's style was to turn protective techniques into offensive attacks. He excelled at punching and kicking and was adamant about having an immediate response to every one of his opponent's techniques, thus creating his trademark counter-kicking style. The amount of skill he had in combination with his unusual style led to him being praised by various golden era fighters, with Kaensak repeatedly appearing in the lists of top 5 Muay Thai fighters by renowned golden era fighters.

Owing to his fluency with knee fighting that he honed before transferring to the Sor.Ploenjit gym, Kaensak did not lose to Muay Khao fighters by using a wide variety of both inside and outside techniques to prevent clinches and to cancel knee strikes. Most notably, Kaensak's trilogy against "The Vampire's Knees" Lamnamoon Sor.Sumalee wherein Kaensak shut down and controlled the tall knee fighter were considered top-of-the-line matchups. In addition, Kaensak scored a draw and a victory against "The Heartless Knee Striker" Langsuan Panyuthaphum.

=== Elite career in Bangkok ===
In 1989 Kaensak would enter the peak of his career by earning Lumpinee and Rajadamnern stadium titles simultaneously within the same weight class, becoming one of the handful of fighters who were able to do so. He ended the year with a 9-0-1 record for which he was given the most prestigious and respected title in Muay Thai: The Sports Writers Association of Thailand Fighter of the Year. Kaensak's peak continued into 1990 and he won the Fighter of the Year award for a second time, becoming the first nak muay (Muay Thai fighter) in history to win it for 2 consecutive years. In 1991, Kaensak would receive a purse of ฿380,000 (equivalent to ฿799,355 in 2020), making him the highest paid athlete of the golden era of Muay Thai. In comparison, the usual purse of elite fighters is ฿100,000 and it was rare for one to earn ฿200,000 or higher.

As for his final fight of 1990, he was matched up against "The Sadist" Taweesaklek Ploysakda in Rajadamnern Stadium. Both fighters presented their usual styles, using powerful strikes of wide variety as Taweesaklek was a Muay Bouk (pressure fighter) and Kaensak was an explosive Muay Femur fighter. Kaensak was knocked down by a right cross in the 2nd round, prompting him to become aggressive and to use powerful low kicks; at the time Kaensak would also be known to be one of the strongest low-kickers in the Thai circuit. In the 3rd round, both fighters would use powerful low kicks against each other while Kaensak was pressing forward with punches. Taweesaklek was worn down by the low kicks and got knocked down by Kaensak's punches in the 4th. Kaensak would win the fight by a large margin. This fight was Kaensak's favorite memory from his fighting career; several newspapers and TV stations including Thairath and Channel 7 would label this fight as the 1990 Most Brutal Fight of the Year.

To determine who was to win the 1992 Fighter of the Year award, Jaroensap Kiatbanchong was matched up as the underdog against Kaensak in December 1992 with the Lumpinee junior bantamweight championship (118 lbs/53.5 kg) at stake. Jaroensap won the fight on points and earned both the championship title and the award.

Kaensak and "The Earth-Shattering Left Kick" Singdam Or.Ukrit were matched up in 1993, the most significant year of Singdam's career. In the 2nd round, Kaensak knocked down Singdam with a right hook, and less than 20 seconds later Singdam knocked down Kaensak with a left hook and landed a right hook as Kaensak fell. Kaensak would fight hard for the rest of the fight, but Singdam used various techniques to outscore or nullify Kaensak's counter-kicking style. Singdam ultimately won on points and achieved one of two biggest wins of his career. Both fighters would be awarded the 1993 Sports Writers Association of Thailand Fight of the Year.

Afterward, Kaensak would go on to continue fighting elite competition such as "The Master of Masters" Karuhat Sor.Supawan, Lamnamoon Sor.Sumalee, and "Samart 2" Chatchai Paiseetong. Kaensak was praised for his excellent defensive performance against Lamnamoon's clinches and knees and was also able to defeat the highly skilled Chatchai while he was still in his prime. Kaensak also secured victories against Nungubon Sitlerchai and Hansuk Prasanthinpanomrung.

From 1994 and onwards, Kaensak would begin to lose more often than usual as he went from fighting between 115 - 118 lbs/52.2 - 53.5 kg to fighting as high as 125 lbs/55.8 kg. Despite this, he would almost always be wearing red shorts which in the Thai circuit meant that he was the bettor's favorite.

Kaensak's nickname Yod Muaythai Song Por.Sor. (ยอดมวยไทย 2 พ.ศ.) translates to "The Two-Time Fighter of the Year," a nickname that would also go to Anuwat Kaewsamrit who is the second Muay Thai fighter in history to win the Sports Writers Association of Thailand Fighter of the Year for 2 consecutive years. Kaensak's victory against Langsuan Panyuthamphum as well as both of his fights against Taweesaklek Ploysakda were considered his best fights. Kaensak was matched up against Saenklai Sit Kru Od but they did not fight. The most difficult opponent Kaensak ever faced in his career was a fighter named Samart Lookindia, a fighter that Kaensak faced 4 times before he transferred to the Sor.Ploenjit gym. Samart beat him in all 4 fights.

=== Retirement and later years ===
After losing to Baiphet Lookjaomaesaiware, one of Superbon Banchamek's predecessors, Kaensak decided to retire from Muay Thai competition within Thailand in 1997. Just 6 days after his final Muay Thai fight within Bangkok, Kaensak had his first professional boxing match and won by KO. He would have a second boxing match in the next year and lost by points. In 2000, Kaensak moved to the United States where he became a Muay Thai instructor and judge. He came out of retirement multiple times by fighting at a higher weight class against foreign champions Fabio Pinca and Tetsuya Yamato. He taught at AMA Fight Club in New Jersey, and now teaches at his own gym called the Kaensak Muaythai Gym which opened in 2020.

Kaensak cited Poot Lorlek, Vicharnnoi Porntawee, Dieselnoi Chor.Thanasukarn, Samart Payakaroon, and Chamuekpet Hapalang as his top 5 greatest Muay Thai fighters.

== Titles & honours ==
- Lumpinee Stadium
  - 1989 Lumpinee Stadium Flyweight (112 lbs) Champion
  - 1989 Lumpinee Stadium Fighter of the Year
- Rajadamnern Stadium
  - 1989 Rajadamnern Stadium Flyweight (112 lbs) Champion
- World Council of Kickboxing
  - 2006 WCK World Super Lightweight (140 lbs) Champion
- International Karate Kickboxing Council
  - 2007 IKKC World Super Lightweight (140 lbs) Champion
- Awards
  - 1989 Sports Writers Association of Thailand Fighter of the Year
  - 1990 Sports Writers Association of Thailand Fighter of the Year
  - 1993 Sports Writers Association of Thailand Fight of the Year (vs Singdam Or.Ukrit on July 13)

== Muay Thai record ==
Muay Thai Record (Incomplete)
Date	Result	Opponent	Event	Location	Method	Round	Time
2009-07-19	Loss	(Japan) Tetsuya Yamato	Ultimate Warriors	Anaheim, United States	KO (Left body shot)	5	2:59
For the WMC International Lightweight (135 lbs) title.
2008-07-19	Loss	(France) Fabio Pinca	WCK: Full Rules Muay Thai, Pechanga Resort Casino	Temecula, CA	Decision (Unanimous)	5	3:00
2007-09-08	Loss	(France) Fabio Pinca	WBC Muay Thai Presents: World Championship Muay Thai	Gardena, CA	Decision (Split)	5	3:00
For the WBC Muay Thai International Lightweight (135 lbs) title.
2007-04-05	Win	(France) Pascal Benmati		Highland, California, United States	KO (Elbow)	2	
2007-02-	Win	(Canada) Raul Llopis		New York, United States	Decision	5	3:00
2000-	Win	(Romania) Andrea		California, United States			
1996-10-18	Loss	(Thailand) Baiphet Lookjaomaesaiware	Onesongchai, Lumpinee Stadium	Bangkok, Thailand	Decision	5	3:00
1995-12-08	Loss	(Thailand) Prabsuek Sitnarong	Onesongchai, Lumpinee Stadium	Bangkok, Thailand	Decision	5	3:00
1995-09-18	Loss	(Thailand) Muangfahlek Kiatwichian	Rajadamnern Stadium	Bangkok, Thailand	Decision	5	3:00
1995-08-25	Win	(Thailand) Nungubon Sitlerchai	Onesongchai, Lumpinee Stadium	Bangkok, Thailand	Decision	5	3:00
1995-06-09	Loss	(Thailand) Dokmaipa Por.Pongsawang	Lumpinee Stadium	Bangkok, Thailand	Decision	5	3:00
1995-04-	Loss	(Thailand) Cheangnern Sitputthapim	Lumpinee Stadium	Bangkok, Thailand	Decision	5	3:00
1995-03-13	Loss	(Thailand) Cheangnern Sitputthapim	Chaomueangchon, Rajadamnern Stadium	Bangkok, Thailand	Decision	5	3:00
1994-10-28	Loss	(Thailand) Silapathai Jockygym	Lumpinee Stadium	Bangkok, Thailand	Decision	5	3:00
1994-09-27	Win	(Thailand) Hansuk Prasathinpanomrung	Lumpinee Stadium	Bangkok, Thailand	Decision	5	3:00
1994-08-22	Loss	(Thailand) Karuhat Sor.Supawan	Rajadamnern Stadium	Bangkok, Thailand	Decision	5	3:00
1994-05-31	Loss	(Thailand) Hansuk Prasathinpanomrung	Lumpinee Stadium	Bangkok, Thailand	Decision	5	3:00
1994-03-25	Loss	(Thailand) Nungubon Sitlerchai	Lumpinee Stadium	Bangkok, Thailand	Decision	5	3:00
1994-02-15	Loss	(Thailand) Wangchannoi Sor.Palangchai	Lumpinee Stadium	Bangkok, Thailand	Decision	5	3:00
1994-01-28	Win	(Thailand) Chatchai Paiseetong	Onesongchai, Lumpinee Stadium	Bangkok, Thailand	Decision	5	3:00
1994-01-07	Win	(Thailand) Nungubon Sitlerchai	Lumpinee Stadium	Bangkok, Thailand	Decision	5	3:00
1993-12-07	Win	(Thailand) Lamnamoon Sor.Sumalee	Lumpinee Stadium	Bangkok, Thailand	Decision	5	3:00
1993-10-16	Draw	(Thailand) Lamnamoon Sor.Sumalee	Rajadamnern Stadium	Bangkok, Thailand	Decision	5	3:00
1993-09-17	Win	(Thailand) Nungubon Sitlerchai	Lumpinee Stadium	Bangkok, Thailand	Decision	5	3:00
1993-07-13	Loss	(Thailand) Singdam Or.Ukrit	Lumpinee Stadium	Bangkok, Thailand	Decision	5	3:00
1993-06-08	Win	(Thailand) Lamnamoon Sor.Sumalee	Lumpinee Stadium	Bangkok, Thailand	Decision	5	3:00
1993-04-06	Loss	(Thailand) Karuhat Sor.Supawan	Lumpinee Stadium	Bangkok, Thailand	Decision	5	3:00
1993-01-08	Win	(Thailand) Jaroensap Kiatbanchong	Lumpinee Stadium	Bangkok, Thailand	Decision	5	3:00
1992-12-04	Loss	(Thailand) Jaroensap Kiatbanchong	Lumpinee Stadium	Bangkok, Thailand	Decision	5	3:00
1992-10-27	Win	(Thailand) Wicharn Sitchuchon	Lumpinee Stadium	Bangkok, Thailand	Decision	5	3:00
1992-07-27	Win	(Thailand) Dokmaipa Por.Pongsawang	Chaomueangchon, Rajadamnern Stadium	Bangkok, Thailand	Decision	5	3:00
1991-03-19	Win	(Thailand) Taweesaklek Ploysakda	Lumpinee Stadium	Bangkok, Thailand	Decision	5	3:00
1990-12-26	Win	(Thailand) Taweesaklek Ploysakda	Rajadamnern Stadium	Bangkok, Thailand	Decision	5	3:00
1990-10-22	Draw	(Thailand) Veeraphol Sahaprom	Yodnuamthong, Rajadamnern Stadium	Bangkok, Thailand	Decision	5	3:00
1990-08-30	Win	(Thailand) Santos Devy	Daorungchucharoen, Rajadamnern Stadium	Bangkok, Thailand	Decision	5	3:00
1990-08-06	Win	(Thailand) Eakapol Chuwattana	Rajadamnern Stadium	Bangkok, Thailand	Decision	5	3:00
1990-04-26	Win	(Thailand) Suwitlek Lookbangplasoi	Rajadamnern Stadium	Bangkok, Thailand	Decision	5	3:00
1990-03-21	Loss	(Thailand) Santos Devy	Yodnuamthong, Rajadamnern Stadium	Bangkok, Thailand	Decision	5	3:00
1989-10-27	Win	(Thailand) Peemai Or.Yuttanakorn	Lumpinee Stadium	Bangkok, Thailand	Decision	5	3:00
1989-09-26	Win	(Thailand) Langsuan Panyuthaphum	Lumpinee Stadium	Bangkok, Thailand	Decision	5	3:00
1989-09-05	Draw	(Thailand) Langsuan Panyuthaphum	Lumpinee Stadium	Bangkok, Thailand	Decision	5	3:00
For the Lumpinee Stadium Super Flyweight (115 lbs) title.
1989-07-25	Win	(Thailand) Karuhat Sor.Supawan	Lumpinee Stadium	Bangkok, Thailand	Decision	5	3:00
1989-06-05	Win	(Thailand) Dennuea Denmolee	Rajadamnern Stadium	Bangkok, Thailand	Decision	5	3:00
Wins the Rajadamnern Stadium Flyweight (112 lbs) title.
1989-05-02	Win	(Thailand) Paruhatlek Sitchunthong	Yodmuaylok, Lumpinee Stadium	Bangkok, Thailand	Decision	5	3:00
Wins the Lumpinee Stadium Flyweight (112 lbs) title.
1989-02-21	Win	(Thailand) Seesot Sahakarnosot	Onesongchai, Lumpinee Stadium	Bangkok, Thailand	Decision	5	3:00
1989-01-31	Win	(Thailand) Saeksan Sitjomthong	Lumpinee Stadium	Bangkok, Thailand	Decision	5	3:00
1989-01-07	Win	(Thailand) Panphet Muangsurin	Lumpinee Stadium	Bangkok, Thailand	Decision	5	3:00
1988-11-25	Loss	(Thailand) Phetchan Sor.Bodin	Lumpinee Stadium	Bangkok, Thailand	Decision	5	3:00
1988-08-30	Win	(Thailand) Thammachart Meungphatalung	Lumpinee Stadium	Bangkok, Thailand	Decision	5	3:00
1988-07-26	Loss	(Thailand) Panphet Muangsurin	Onesongchai, Lumpinee Stadium	Bangkok, Thailand	Decision	5	3:00
1988-05-31	Win	(Thailand) Samurai Sithiran	Onesongchai, Lumpinee Stadium	Bangkok, Thailand	KO	5	
1988-03-15	Loss	(Thailand) Karuhat Sor.Supawan	Lumpinee Stadium	Bangkok, Thailand	Decision	5	3:00
1987-04-26	Loss	(Thailand) Samad Phukrongfa	Onesongchai, Lumpinee Stadium	Bangkok, Thailand	Decision	5	3:00
1986-	Win	(Thailand) Fahsatan Lukprabath	Rajadamnern Stadium	Bangkok, Thailand	Decision	5	3:00
Kaensak's first fight at a Bangkok Stadium.
Legend: Win Loss Draw/No contest Notes

== Professional boxing record ==
2 fights	1 win	1 loss
By knockout	1	0
By decision	0	1
Draws	0	

No.	Result	Record	Opponent	Type	Round	Date	Location
2	Loss	1–1	Jess Maca	PTS	10	Mar 1, 1997	Chachoengsao Stadium, Chachoengsao, Thailand
1	Win	1–0	Alberto Corbolan	KO	4	Nov 24, 1996	Provincial Stadium, Ubon Ratchathani, Thailand
