= Samrong =

Samrong may refer to:

== In Cambodia ==
- Samraong (town), also spelled Samrong, the major town of Oddar Meanchey Province

== In Thailand ==
- Khlong Samrong, a canal in Samut Prakan Province, which gives its name to the following:
  - Samrong Nuea, often shortened to just Samrong, a subdistrict and neighbourhood in Mueang Samut Prakan District, Samut Prakan Province
    - Samrong BTS Station, a Bangkok BTS Skytrain station in this area
  - Samrong, Samrong Klang, and Samrong Tai subdistricts in Phra Pradaeng District
- Samrong district in Ubon Ratchathani Province
