= Rungphet Wor Rungniran =

Thai Muay Thai fighter

- Born: June 12, 1989 (age 37); Krabi, Thailand
- Other names: Rungpetch Kiatjaroenchai
- Height: 164 cm (5 ft 5 in)
- Weight: 55 kg (121 lb; 8.7 st)
- Stance: Orthodox
- Fighting out of: Bangkok, Thailand
- Team: Wor Wiwatthanon

Other information
- Occupation: Muay Thai trainer

Rungphet Wor Rungniran (Thai: รุ่งเพชร ว.รุ่งนิรันดร์) is a retired Thai Muay Thai fighter. He currently teaches at Evolve MMA in Singapore.

== Titles and accomplishments ==
- Lumpinee Stadium
  - 2009 Lumpinee Stadium 115 lbs Champion
- Siam Omnoi Stadium
  - Omnoi Stadium 115 lbs Champion
  - Omnoi Stadium 118 lbs Champion
- Channel 7 Boxing Stadium
  - 2006 Channel 7 Stadium 105 lbs Champion
  - 2012 Channel 7 Stadium 126 lbs Champion

== Fight record ==
Muay Thai Record
Date	Result	Opponent	Event	Location	Method	Round	Time
2018-07-29	Loss	(Japan) Kotaro Shimano	MA Japan Kick - Tekken 11	Chiba (city), Japan	Decision (Unanimous)	3	3:00
2017-11-05	Win	(Japan) Yuu Wor.Wanchai	Suk Wanchai+NorNaksin Tokyo MuayThai Super Fight	Tokyo, Japan	Decision (Unanimous)	3	3:00
2016-12-25	Loss	(Thailand) Senkeng Kelasport	Channel 7 Boxing Stadium	Bangkok, Thailand	Decision	5	3:00
2016-09-18	Loss	(Thailand) Palangchai Por.Phinabhat	Komchadluek Boxing Stadium	Thailand	KO	4	
2016-06-26	Win	(Thailand) Yuthakan Thor.Thepsuthin	Rangsit Boxing Stadium	Thailand	Decision	5	3:00
2016-03-26	Draw	(Thailand) Phornsawan Chokpraneefarm	Lumpinee Stadium	Bangkok, Thailand	Decision	5	3:00
2016-01-31	Loss	(Thailand) Mongkolpetch Petchyindee	Rangsit Boxing Stadium	Thailand	KO	1	
2015-11-24	Loss	(Thailand) Yuthakan Thor.Thepsuthin		Thailand	Decision	5	3:00
2015-09-13	Win	(Thailand) Yuthakan Thor.Thepsuthin	Channel 7 Boxing Stadium	Bangkok, Thailand	Decision	5	3:00
2015-08-06	Loss	(Thailand) Extra Sitworaphat	Rajadamnern Stadium	Bangkok, Thailand	Decision	5	3:00
2015-06-14	Win	(Thailand) Yuthakan Thor.Thepsuthin		Mueang Ratchaburi District, Thailand	Decision	5	3:00
2015-04-25	Loss	(Thailand) Phetmorakot Teeded99	Channel 7 Boxing Stadium	Bangkok, Thailand	Decision	5	3:00
2015-02-27	Win	(Thailand) Denchiangkwan Lamtongkarnpeth	Lumpinee Stadium	Bangkok, Thailand	Decision	5	3:00
2015-01-15	Loss	(Thailand) Kaotam Lookprabaht	Rajadamnern Stadium	Bangkok, Thailand	Decision	5	3:00
2014-11-24	Loss	(Thailand) Fonpanlarn P.K.SanchaiMuaythaiGym	Rajadamnern Stadium	Bangkok, Thailand	Decision	5	3:00
2014-09-11	Win	(Thailand) Surachai Srisuriyanyothin	Rajadamnern Stadium	Bangkok, Thailand	Decision	5	3:00
2014-03-30	Loss	(Thailand) Pettawee Sor Kittichai		Songkhla province, Thailand	Decision	5	3:00
2013-10-03	Loss	(Thailand) Kengsiam Nor Siripung	Rajadamnern Stadium	Bangkok, Thailand	Decision	5	3:00
2013-09-06	Loss	(Thailand) Rungpet Kaiyanghadao	Lumpinee Stadium	Bangkok, Thailand	Decision	5	3:00
For the vacant Lumpinee Stadium 122 lbs title.
2013-04-26	Draw	(Thailand) Yuthakan Thor.Thepsuthin	Lumpinee Stadium	Bangkok, Thailand	Decision	5	3:00
2013-02-12	Loss	(Thailand) Lukman Fonjangchonburi	Lumpinee Stadium	Bangkok, Thailand	Decision	5	3:00
2012-12-02	Win	(Thailand) Rakkiat Kiatprapat	Channel 7 Boxing Stadium	Bangkok, Thailand	Decision	5	3:00
Wins the vacant BBTV Channel 7 Stadium 126 lbs title.
2012-10-21	Win	(Thailand) Kaotam Lookprabaht	Lumpinee Stadium	Bangkok, Thailand	Decision	5	3:00
2012-08-10	Win	(Thailand) Fahmongkol Sor.Jor.Laiprachin	Lumpinee Stadium	Bangkok, Thailand	Decision	5	3:00
2012-02-05	Loss	(Thailand) Rungravee Sasiprapa	Channel 7 Boxing Stadium	Bangkok, Thailand	Decision	5	3:00
For the vacant BBTV Channel 7 Stadium Featherweight title (126 lbs).
2011-09-22	Win	(Thailand) Rungruanglek Lukprabat	Rajadamnern Stadium	Bangkok, Thailand	Decision	5	3:00
2011-07-02	Win	(Thailand) Pinsiam Sor.Amnuaysirichoke	Channel 7 Boxing Stadium	Bangkok, Thailand	Decision	5	3:00
2011-05-31	Win	(Thailand) Denchiangkwan Lamtongkarnpeth	Lumpinee Stadium	Bangkok, Thailand	TKO		
2011-03-08	Loss	(Thailand) Kaotam Lookprabaht	Lumpinee Stadium	Bangkok, Thailand	Decision	5	3:00
For the vacant Lumpinee Stadium 118 lbs title.
2011-02-01	Draw	(Thailand) Lertpet Sor Thor Monphonthong	Lumpinee Stadium	Bangkok, Thailand	Decision	5	3:00
2010-12-23	Win	(Thailand) Kaotam Lookprabaht	Rajadamnern Stadium	Bangkok, Thailand	Decision	5	3:00
2010-08-25	Win	(Thailand) Chatchainoi GardenSeaview	Onesongchai, Rajadamnern Stadium	Bangkok, Thailand	KO	4	
2010-06-15	Loss	(Thailand) Visanlek Nakhonthong	Lumpinee Stadium	Bangkok, Thailand	Decision	5	3:00
2010-02-26	Loss	(Thailand) Muangsee Pumpanmuang	Lumpinee Stadium	Bangkok, Thailand	Decision	5	3:00
2009-09-12	Loss	(Thailand) Thianchai Kor.Sapaothong	Omnoi Stadium	Samut Sakhon, Thailand	Decision	5	3:00
2009-07-18	Win	(Thailand) Maklaek Sit Itisukto	Omnoi Stadium	Samut Sakhon, Thailand	KO	2	
2009-05-09	NC	(Thailand) Sirisak Sitkruyiam	Omnoi Stadium	Samut Sakhon, Thailand	Rungphet dismissed	5	
2009-03-06	Win	(Thailand) Singdam Chockkanna	Lumpinee Stadium	Bangkok, Thailand	Decision	5	3:00
Wins the vacant Lumpinee Stadium 115 lbs title.
2008-	Win	(Thailand) Kangkenlek Sor.Tawarung	Lumpinee Stadium	Thailand	TKO	4	
2008-11-10	Loss	(Thailand) Ritthidet Wor.Wanthawee	Yodwanpadet, Rajadamnern Stadium	Bangkok, Thailand	Decision	5	3:00
2008-09-27	Win	(Thailand) Ritthidet Wor.Wanthawee	Omnoi Stadium	Samut Sakhon, Thailand	Decision	5	3:00
2008-07-19	Loss	(Thailand) Ritthidet Wor.Wanthawee		Krabi, Thailand	Decision	5	3:00
2008-05-16	Win	(Thailand) Amnuaydet Teeded99	Saengmorakot, Lumpinee Stadium	Bangkok, Thailand	Decision	5	3:00
2008-02-15	Win	(Thailand) Amnuaydet Teeded99	Kiatpetch, Lumpinee Stadium	Bangkok, Thailand	Decision	5	3:00
2007-11-30	Win	(Thailand) Ponkrit Por.Kumpanart	Lumpinee Stadium	Bangkok, Thailand	Decision	5	3:00
2007-05-11	Loss	(Thailand) Thongran Sitnumnoi	Petchaopraya, Rajadamnern Stadium	Bangkok, Thailand	Decision	5	3:00
2007-03-13	Win	(Thailand) Samingdet Chor.Watcharin	Saengmorakot, Lumpinee Stadium	Bangkok, Thailand	KO	3	
2007-01-16	Loss	(Thailand) Phetsiwa BanbBuaThongMotor	Kiatpetch, Lumpinee Stadium	Bangkok, Thailand	Decision	5	3:00
2006-09-24	Loss	(Thailand) Khunphon Jiw Saengpanpla	Lumpinee Stadium	Bangkok, Thailand	Decision	5	3:00
2006-07-30	Win	(Thailand) Ponkrit Por.Kumpanart	Channel 7 Stadium	Bangkok, Thailand	Decision	5	3:00
Wins the vacant Channel 7 Stadium 105 lbs title.
2006-06-11	Win	(Thailand) Saenganan Lukbanyai	Channel 7 Stadium	Bangkok, Thailand	Decision	5	3:00
Legend: Win Loss Draw/No contest Notes
