= Kaotam Lookprabaht =

Thai Muay Thai fighter

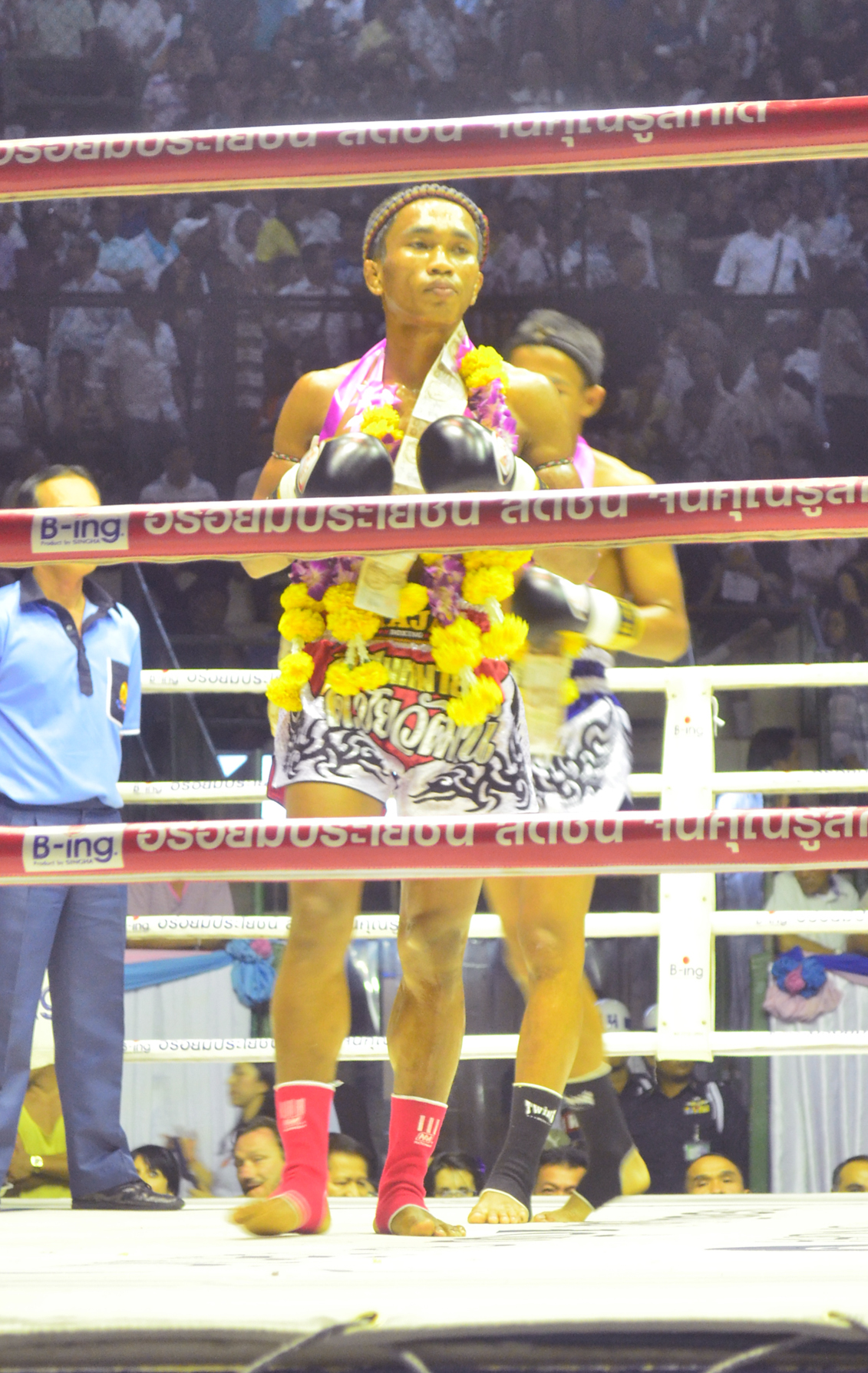
- Born: Thirachet Thongpradap; June 12, 1990 (age 36); Surin Province, Thailand
- Other names: Kaotaem Lookprabat
- Height: 164 cm (5 ft 5 in)
- Weight: 55 kg (121 lb; 8.7 st)
- Division: Bantamweight; Super Bantamweight; Featherweight
- Stance: Southpaw
- Fighting out of: Bangkok, Thailand
- Team: Lookprabat

Thirachet Thongpradap (ถิรเจตน์ ทองประดับ), known professionally as Kaotam Lookprabaht (เก้าแต้ม ลูกพระบาท) is a Thai former Muay Thai fighter. He is now a trainer at Evolve MMA in Singapore.

== Biography and career ==
Thirachet Thongpradap, nicknamed Taem, was born in Prasat District, Surin Province. He started his Muay Thai career with Kingthong Lookprabat as manager

On June 30, 2009, Kaotam competed on a Petchyindee promoted event at the Lumpinee Boxing Stadium, where he lost on points to Songkhom Wor.Sangprapai.

On August 30, 2011, Kaotam competed on Paironan promotion event, where he faced Nongbeer Chokngamwong. He won the fight by decision.

On October 25, 2011, Kaotam competed in the main event of a Petchyindee card at the Lumpinee Stadium, where he lost on points to Kwankao Chor.RatchaphatsaduIsan.

On June 22, 2012, Kaotam competed in the main event of a Sangmorakot promoted event at the Lumpinee Boxing Stadium. He defeated Mongkolchai Kwaitonggym by decision.

== Titles and accomplishments ==
- Rajadamnern Stadium
  - 2011 Lumpinee Stadium 118 lbs Champion
- Rajadamnern Stadium
  - 2016 Rajadamnern Stadium 122 lbs Champion
    - Two successful title defenses

== Fight record ==
Muay Thai Record
Date	Result	Opponent	Event	Location	Method	Round	Time
2018-08-29	Win	(Japan) MOMOTARO	SUK WAN KINGTHONG	Tokyo, Japan	Decision (Unanimous)	5	3:00
2017-11-05	Win	(Japan) Hiroya Haga	Suk wanchai + Nor.Naksin	Tokyo, Japan	Decision	3	3:00
2017-07-10	Loss	(Thailand) Pakayphet Eminentair	Rajadamnern Stadium	Bangkok, Thailand	Decision	5	3:00
2017-06-14	Loss	(Thailand) Yodkhunsuk Ratchaphatmubanchombueng	Rajadamnern Stadium	Bangkok, Thailand	Decision	5	3:00
2017-05-15	Win	(Thailand) Nungpichit Keatchuchai	Rajadamnern Stadium	Bangkok, Thailand	Decision	5	3:00
Defends the Rajadamnern Stadium 122 lbs title.
2017-03-29	Win	(Thailand) Panomroonglek Kiatmuu9	Rajadamnern Stadium	Bangkok, Thailand	Decision	5	3:00
2017-01-26	Loss	(Thailand) Nungpichit Keatchuchai	Rajadamnern Stadium	Bangkok, Thailand	Decision	5	3:00
2016-12-22	Win	(Thailand) Matee Sor.Jor Vichitpidrew	Rajadamnern Stadium	Bangkok, Thailand	Decision	5	3:00
Defends the Rajadamnern Stadium 122 lbs title.
2016-11-06	Win	(Japan) Hirohito Takizawa	SNKA KICK Insist 5	Tokyo, Japan	Decision (Unanimous)	5	3:00
2015-10-03	Win	(Thailand) Sonnarai Sor.Sommai	Rajadamnern Stadium	Bangkok, Thailand	KO	3	
2016-08-19	Loss	(Thailand) Wieerachai Wor Wiwatananont	Lumpinee Stadium	Bangkok, Thailand	Decision	5	3:00
2016-07-17	Loss	(Thailand) Matee Sor.Jor Vichitpidrew	Rajadamnern Stadium	Bangkok, Thailand	Decision	5	3:00
2016-04-04	Win	(Thailand) Khukkak Por.Paoin	Rajadamnern Stadium	Bangkok, Thailand	Decision	5	3:00
2016-03-10	Win	(Thailand) Phetnamngam Aor.Kwanmuang	Rajadamnern Stadium	Bangkok, Thailand	Decision	5	3:00
Wins the Rajadamnern Stadium 122 lbs title.
2016-01-15	Win	(Thailand) Phetnamngam Aor.Kwanmuang	Lumpinee Stadium	Bangkok, Thailand	Decision	5	3:00
2015-12-09	Win	(Thailand) Wirachai Wor Wiwatananont	Rajadamnern Stadium	Bangkok, Thailand	Decision	5	3:00
2015-10-25	Win	(Thailand) Yodkhunsuk Ratchaphatmubanchombueng	Rajadamnern Stadium	Bangkok, Thailand	Decision	5	3:00
2015-09-02	Win	(Thailand) Yodkhunsuk Ratchaphatmubanchombueng	Rajadamnern Stadium	Bangkok, Thailand	Decision	5	3:00
2015-07-23	Loss	(Thailand) Yardfar R-Airline	Rajadamnern Stadium	Bangkok, Thailand	Decision	5	3:00
2015-06-28	Loss	(Thailand) Sonnarai Sor.Sommai	Rajadamnern Stadium	Bangkok, Thailand	Decision	5	3:00
2015-05-12	Loss	(Thailand) Suakim PK Saenchaimuaythaigym	Lumpinee Stadium	Bangkok, Thailand	Decision	5	3:00
2015-01-15	Win	(Thailand) Rungphet Kiatjaroenchai	Rajadamnern Stadium	Bangkok, Thailand	Decision	5	3:00
2014-09-12	Loss	(Thailand) Yuthakan Phet-Por.Tor.Or.	Rajadamnern Stadium	Bangkok, Thailand	Decision	5	3:00
2014-09-12	Win	(Thailand) Denchiangkwan Lamethongarnpaet	Lumpinee Stadium	Bangkok, Thailand	Decision	5	3:00
2014-08-17	Loss	(Thailand) Denchiangkwan Lamethongarnpaet	Footkien Group Tournament Final	Thailand	Decision	5	3:00
2014-07-19	Win	(Thailand) Songkom Sakhomseen	Footkien Group Tournament	Thailand	Decision	5	3:00
2014-04-26	Win	(Thailand) Songkom Sakhomseen		Thailand	Decision	5	3:00
2014-03-22	Loss	(Thailand) Petchseenin Suanarhanpeekmai		Thailand	Decision	5	3:00
2014-02-25	Win	(Thailand) Awutlek Kiatjaroenchai	Lumpinee Stadium	Bangkok, Thailand	Decision	5	3:00
2013-12-20	Loss	(Thailand) Rungpetch Kiatjaroenchai	Lumpinee Stadium	Bangkok, Thailand	Decision	5	3:00
2012-12-24	Win	(Thailand) Phet Utong Or. Kwanmuang	Lumpinee Stadium	Bangkok, Thailand	Decision	5	3:00
2012-11-20	Loss	(Thailand) Khaimookdam Ekbangsai	Lumpinee Stadium	Bangkok, Thailand	Decision	5	3:00
2012-10-12	Loss	(Thailand) Rungphet Wor Rungniran	Lumpinee Stadium	Bangkok, Thailand	Decision	5	3:00
2012-08-14	Win	(Thailand) Mongkolchai Kwaitonggym	Lumpinee Stadium	Bangkok, Thailand	TKO (Low Kick)	2	
2012-06-22	Win	(Thailand) Mongkolchai Kwaitonggym	Lumpinee Stadium	Bangkok, Thailand	Decision	5	3:00
2012-06-06	Loss	(Thailand) Fahmonkon Sor.Jor.Tong Prajin	Lumpinee Stadium	Bangkok, Thailand	Decision	5	3:00
2012-05-01	Loss	(Thailand) Superbank Mor Ratanabandit		Bangkok, Thailand	Decision	5	3:00
2012-03-23	Win	(Thailand) Manasak Pinsinchai	Lumpinee Stadium	Bangkok, Thailand	Decision	5	3:00
2012-01-12	Win	(Thailand) Manasak Pinsinchai	Rajadamnern Stadium	Bangkok, Thailand	Decision	5	3:00
2011-12-09	Win	(Thailand) Chokpreecha Kor.Sakuncha	Lumpinee Stadium	Bangkok, Thailand	Decision	5	3:00
2011-10-25	Loss	(Thailand) Kwankhao Mor.Ratanabandit	Lumpinee Stadium	Bangkok, Thailand	Decision	5	3:00
2011-09-22	Loss	(Thailand) Petpanomrung Kiatmuu9	Daprungprabaht Fights, Rajadamnern Stadium	Bangkok, Thailand	Decision	5	3:00
2011-08-30	Win	(Thailand) Kaonar P.K.SaenchaiMuaythaiGym	Rajadamnern Stadium	Bangkok, Thailand	Decision	5	3:00
2011-07-07	Draw	(Thailand) Nongbeer Choknamwong	Rajadamnern Stadium	Bangkok, Thailand	Decision	5	3:00
2011-05-10	Win	(Thailand) Khaimookdam Chuwattana	Petchyindee, Lumpinee Stadium	Bangkok, Thailand	Decision	5	3:00
2011-03-31	Loss	(Thailand) Khaimookdam Chuwattana	Rajadamnern Stadium	Bangkok, Thailand	Decision	5	3:00
2011-03-08	Win	(Thailand) Rungphet Wor Rungniran	Lumpinee Stadium	Bangkok, Thailand	Decision	5	3:00
Wins the vacant Lumpinee Stadium 118 lbs title.
2010-12-23	Loss	(Thailand) Rungphet Wor Rungniran	Rajadamnern Stadium	Bangkok, Thailand	Decision	5	3:00
2010-10-06	Win	(Thailand) Kangwanlek Petchyindee	Rajadamnern Stadium	Bangkok, Thailand	Decision	5	3:00
2010-09-14	Win	(Thailand) Ratchaburilek Sor.Jitpattana	Lumpinee Stadium	Bangkok, Thailand	Decision	5	3:00
2010-08-21	Win	(Thailand) Visanlek Nakhonthong	Omnoi Stadium	Bangkok, Thailand	Decision	5	3:00
2010-06-08	Loss	(Thailand) Ratchaburilek Sor.Chitpattana	Lumpinee Stadium	Bangkok, Thailand	Decision	5	3:00
2010-04-16	Win	(Thailand) Nongbeer Choknamwong	Lumpinee Stadium	Bangkok, Thailand	Decision	5	3:00
2010-03-25	Win	(Thailand) Yodmongkol Mueangsima	Rajadamnern Stadium	Bangkok, Thailand	Decision	5	3:00
2009-11-20	Loss	(Thailand) Chatchai Sor.Thanayong	Petchpiya, Lumpinee Stadium	Bangkok, Thailand	Decision	5	3:00
2009-08-11	Win	(Thailand) Nongbeer Choknamwong	Lumpinee Stadium	Bangkok, Thailand	Decision	5	3:00
2009-06-30	Loss	(Thailand) Songkom Wor.Sangprapai	Lumpinee Stadium	Bangkok, Thailand	Decision	5	3:00
2008-08-13	Loss	(Thailand) Lekkla Thanasuranakorn	Daorungprabat, Rajadamnern Stadium	Bangkok, Thailand	Decision	5	3:00
2008-03-11	Loss	(Thailand) Saeksan Or. Kwanmuang	Wanboonya, Lumpinee Stadium	Bangkok, Thailand	Decision	5	3:00
Legend: Win Loss Draw/No contest Notes
