= Lumpinee Boxing Stadium =

Stadium in Bangkok, Thailand

Lumpinee Boxing Stadium (Sanam Muay Lumpinee)
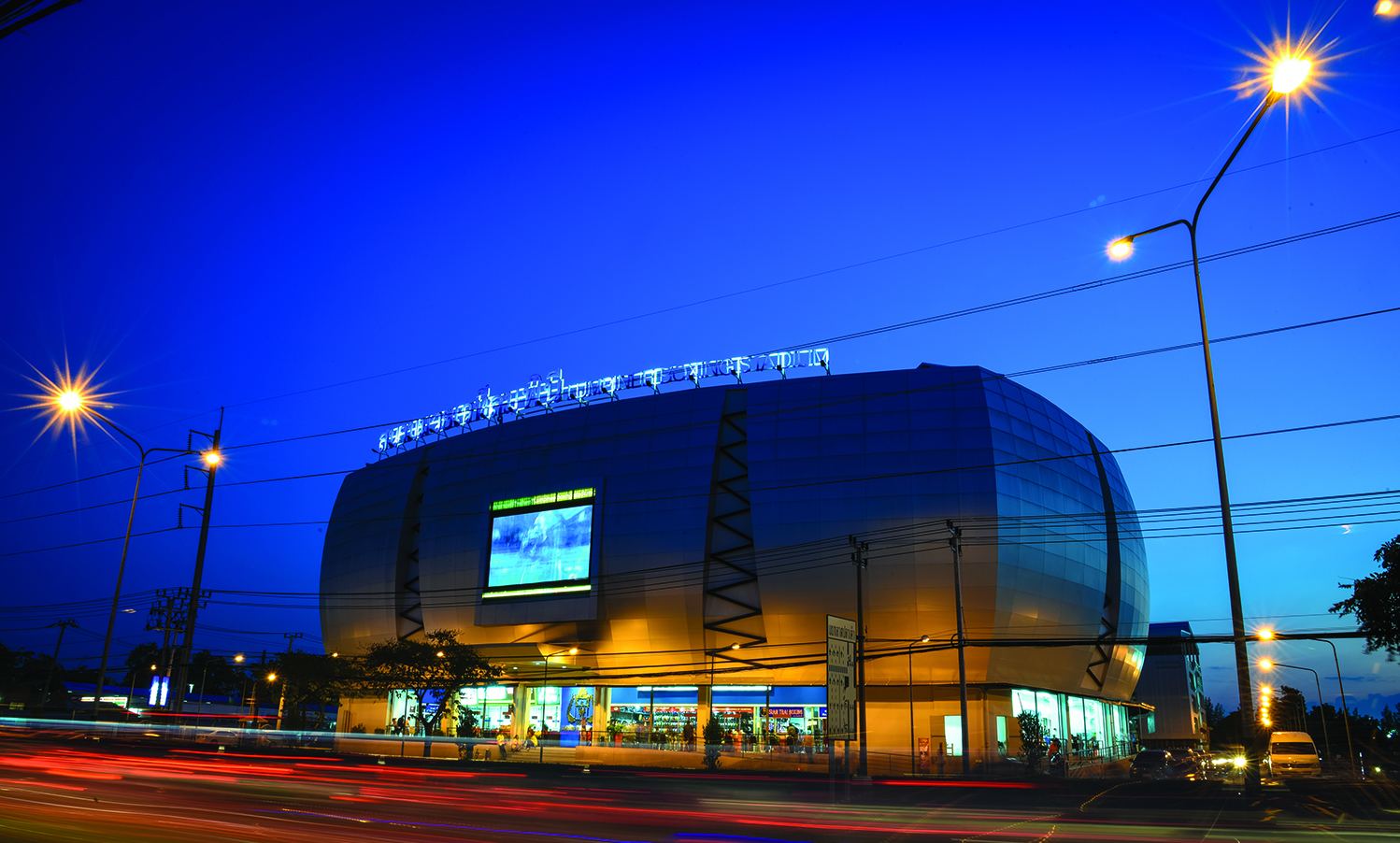
- New Lumpinee Boxing Stadium in 2014
- Interactive map of Lumpinee Boxing Stadium (Sanam Muay Lumpinee)
- Location: Rama IV Road (8 December 1956 – 8 February 2014), Ram Inthra Road (11 February 2014 – present); Bangkok, Thailand
- Coordinates: 13°52′1.36″N 100°36′31.88″E
- Owner: Royal Thai Army; MG Rachit Arunrangsee, President
- Operator: Royal Thai Army
- Capacity: 5,000
- Field size: 3007.5 m^{2}

Construction
- Built: 1956
- Opened: 8 December 1956
- Expanded: 11 February 2014 (move ground)

Tenants
- Songchai Promotions; Annual King's Cup

Website
- muaythaiallinone.com

Lumpinee Boxing Stadium (Thai: สนามเวทีมวยลุมพินี) is a sporting arena in Bangkok, Thailand. Opened more than a decade later than Rajadamnern Stadium, Lumpinee is run by the Royal Thai Army. It has become the symbol of modern Muay Thai. Only Rajadamnern Stadium rivals the prestige of holding the title of "Muay Thai Champion of Lumpinee". The ranking system and championship titles are held from mini flyweight (105 lb) up to super welterweight (154 lb).

Muay Thai bouts are held on Tuesdays, Fridays, and Saturdays. The fights usually start around 18:00.

The final event at its original site on Rama IV Road near Lumphini Park (where One Bangkok is currently being built) was held on 8 February 2014. The stadium then moved to its new home on Ram Inthra Road which can hold up to 5,000 spectators. The new stadium held the first fight on 11 February 2014 and was officially opened on 28 February 2014.

== History ==
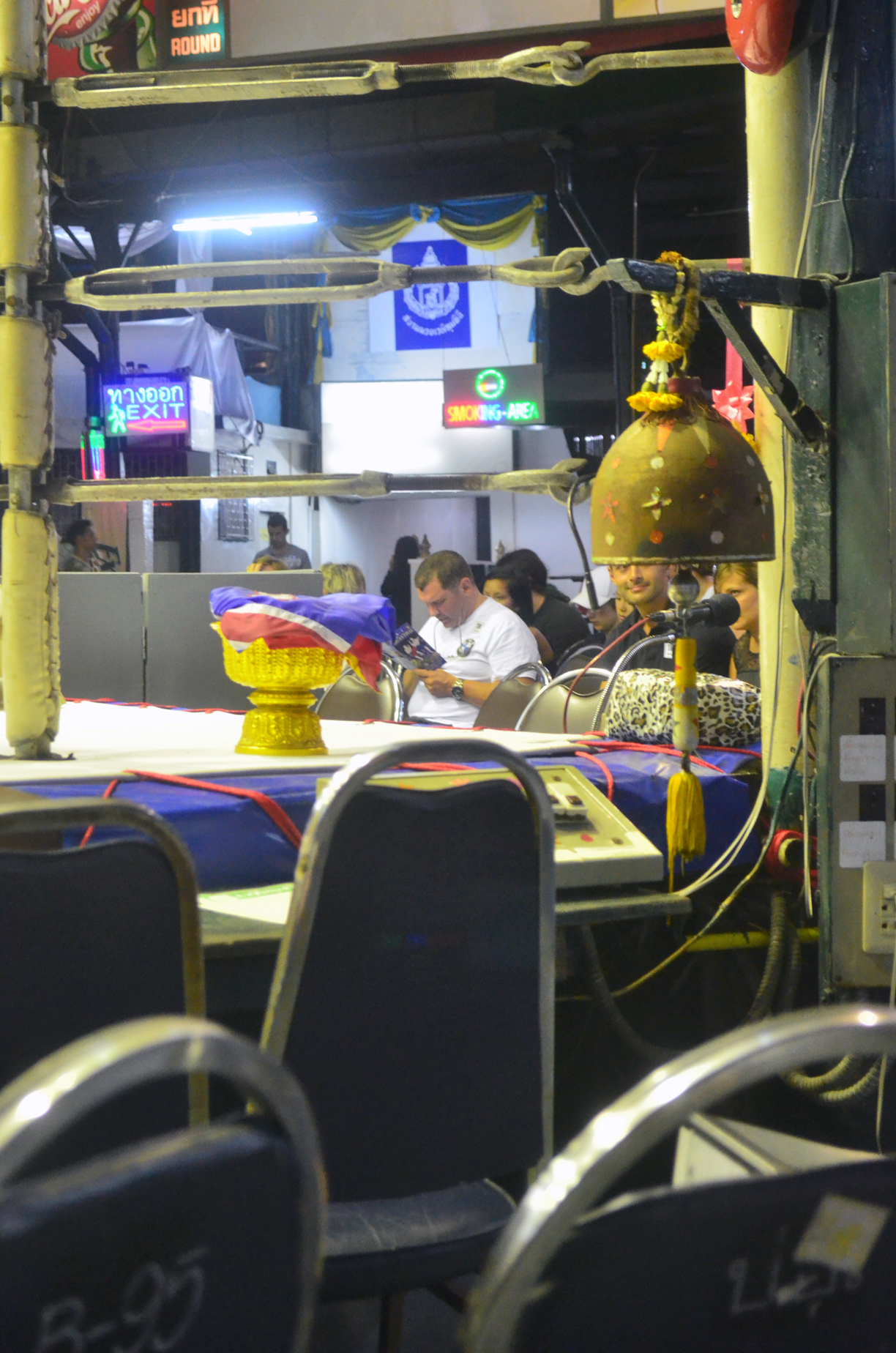
The bell of the old stadium

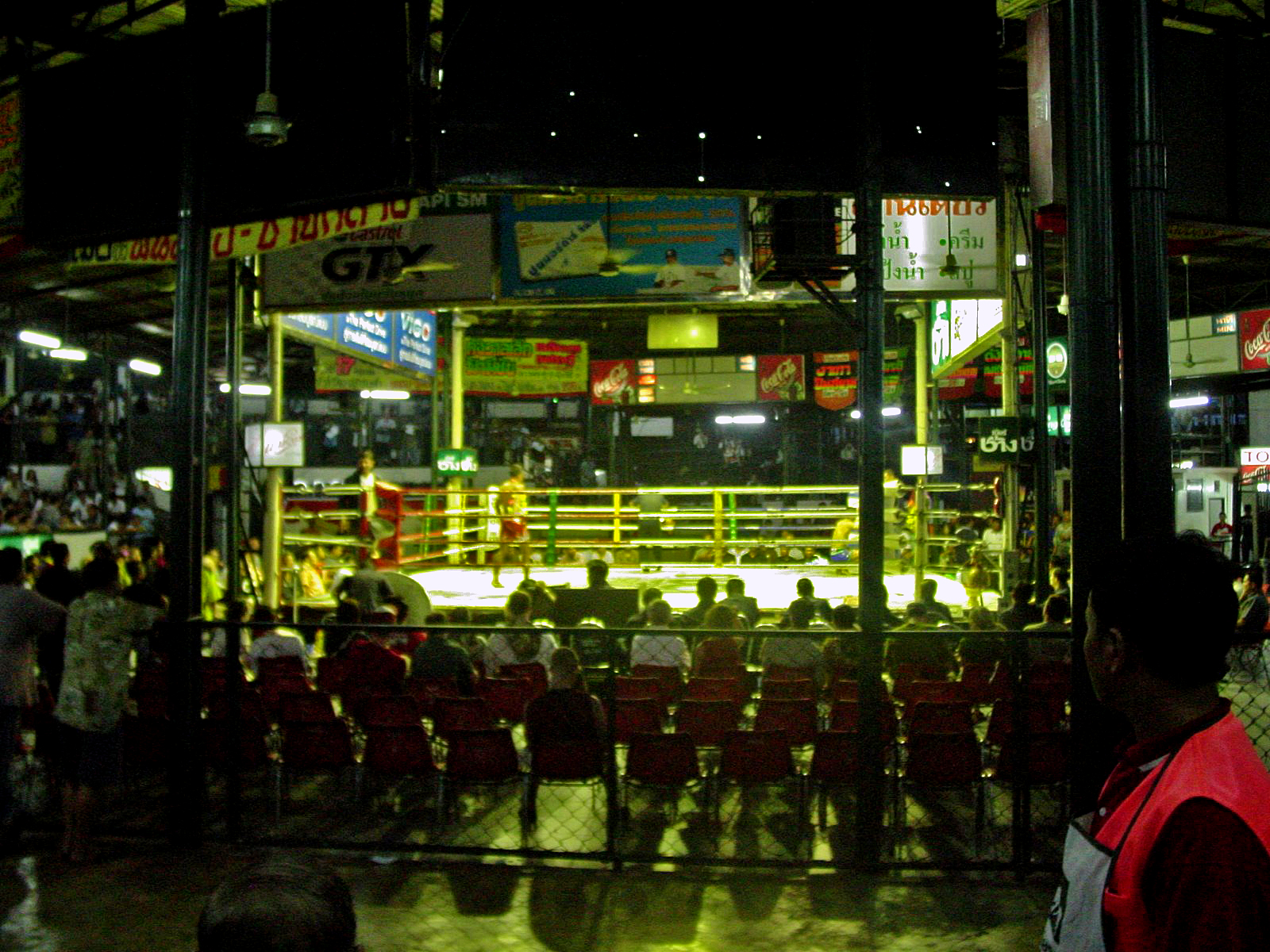
Muay Thai ring at the old stadium in 2005

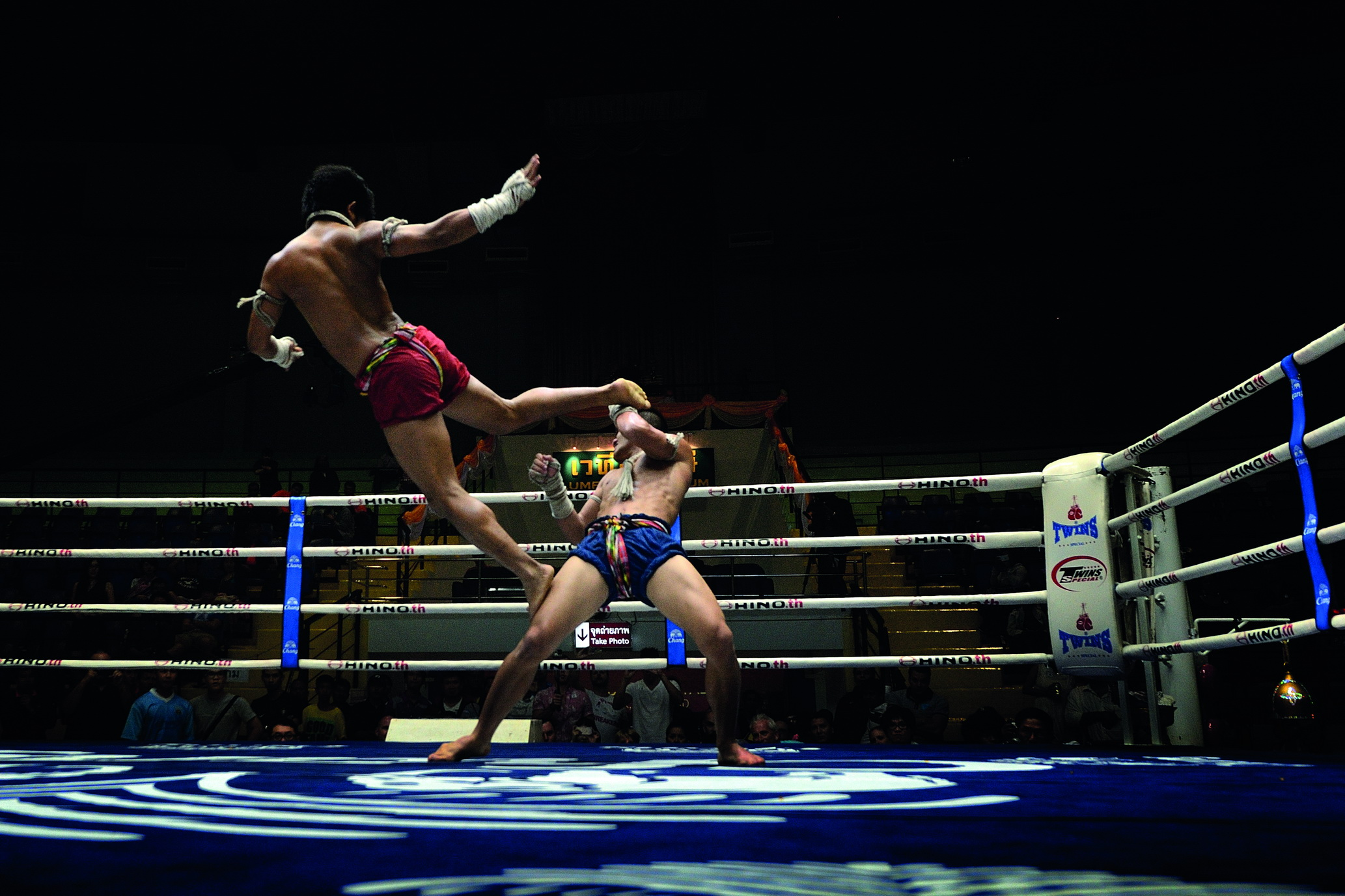
Inside the new stadium

General Praphas Charusathien was the driving force behind the construction of the Lumpinee Stadium, the second national stadium built in Thailand after Rajadamnern. Lumpinee opened its doors on 8 December 1956. The stadium is operated by the Army Welfare Department of the Royal Thai Army. All proceeds from the fights go towards supporting the various departments of the Thai Army. The board of directors, as of 2020 headed by Army Commander Apirat Kongsompong, consists entirely of army officers.

Eleven promoters are responsible for booking boxers to fight at the stadium. The rules are the same as at Rajadamnern: boxers must weigh more than 100 lb (45.4 kg), be older than 15 years, and the weight difference between boxers should not be more than 5 lb (2.3 kg). Women are not allowed to fight in the stadium or enter the ring.

One of the most famous Lumpinee champions was Dieselnoi Chor Thanasukarn who reigned without defeat in the early 1980s, holding the Lightweight title for four years. He was eventually forced to retire because he ran out of opponents.

Lumpinee Stadium was implicated in a cluster of COVID-19 cases during the coronavirus pandemic in Thailand in 2020. Boxing matches were held on 6 March 2020 in spite of a government shutdown order issued on 3 March. Among those later stricken by COVID-19 was the chief of the Army Welfare Department, who had been at the stadium.

In early 2021, it was reported that the Army was considering releasing the stadium to the private sector, or turning the stadium into a museum. In response to this, the Lumpinee management announced their intention to re-brand and implement major changes. These changes included allowing women to fight in the stadium, begin hosting mixed martial arts bouts and ban gambling in order to attract a non-gambling audience.

Traditionally reserved for male fighters, Lumpinee Stadium eventually hosted its first female fight card on 13 November 2021. The main event featured Buakaw Mor.Kor.Chor.Chaiyaphum facing Sanaejan Sor.Jor.Tongprajin for the WBC Muaythai mini flyweight championship and Lumpinee Stadium women's mini flyweight championship, with Sanaejan winning by decision.

Having long been a venue for Muay Thai, Lumpinee Stadium made history by holding its first mixed martial arts event on 16 January 2022, hosted by Fairtex Fight Promotion. The event consisted of both Muay Thai and MMA fights. In August 2022 it began hosting ONE Championship events, with nearly all fights under Muay Thai rules.

Lumpinee Stadium will host Muaythai events during 2025 SEA Games.

== Notable champions ==
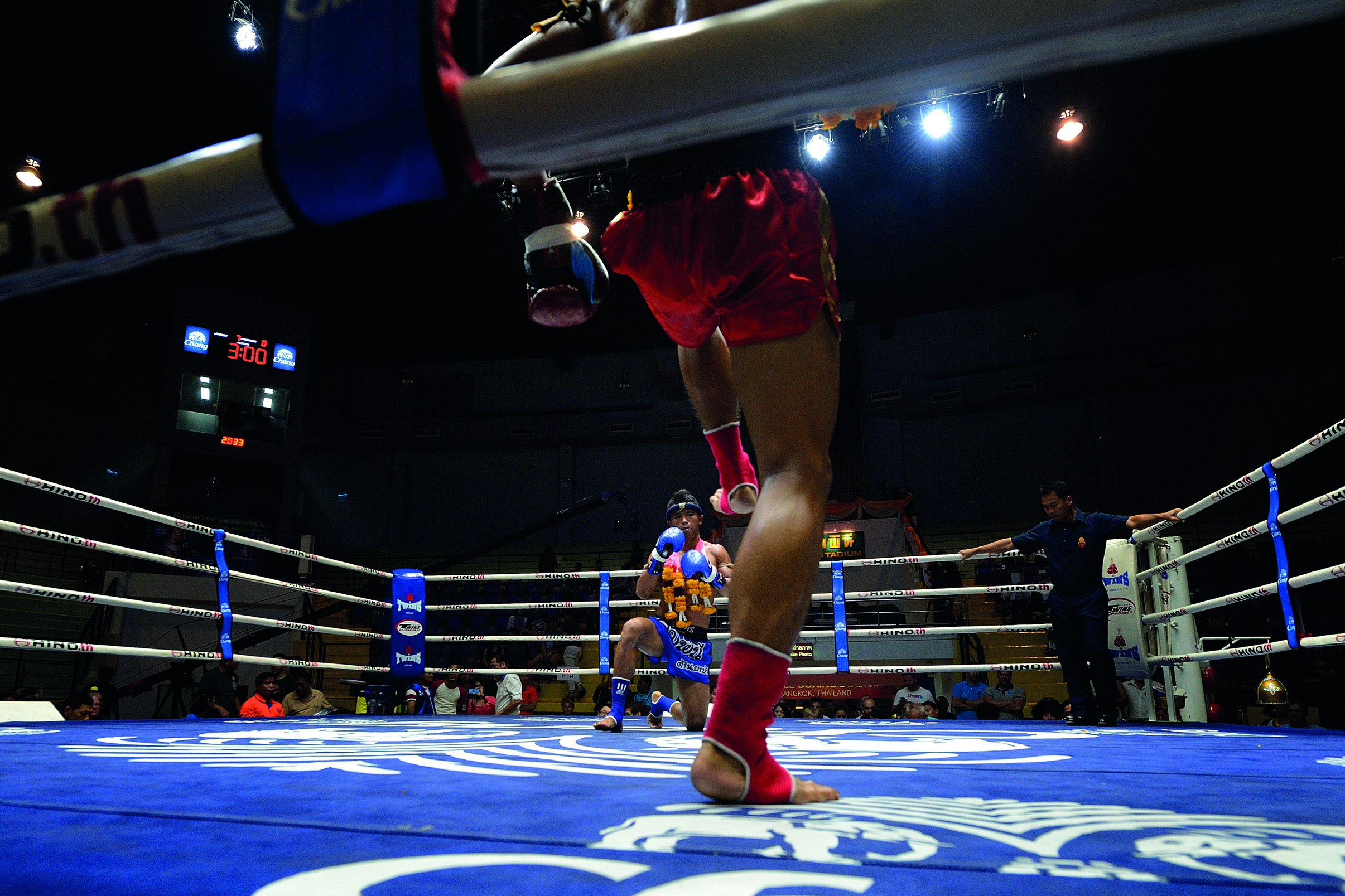
Boxer in new Lumpinee Boxing Stadium

- Apidej Sit-Hirun
- Poot Lorlek
- Wichannoi Porntawee
- Dieselnoi Chor Thanasukarn
- Kongtoranee Payakaroon
- Samart Payakaroon
- Chamuekpet Hapalang
- Karuhat Sor.Supawan
- Saenchai Sor.Kingstar
- Anuwat Kaewsamrit
- Singdam Kiatmuu9
- Petchboonchu FA Group
- Yodsanklai Fairtex
- Sitthichai Sitsongpeenong
- Petpanomrung Kiatmuu9
- Panpayak Jitmuangnon
- Superlek Kiatmuu9

Only six non-Thai athletes have become Lumpinee champions. The first winner was French-Algerian fighter Morad Sari, who claimed the super lightweight championship in 1999. French fighter Damien Alamos won the super lightweight title in 2012 and was the first foreigner to defend the belt later that year. France's Rafi Bohic, won the welterweight title in 2017 and defended the belt four times. Belgian-Morrocan Youssef Boughanem won the middleweight title in 2018. Japan's Nadaka Yoshinari became mini flyweight champion in 2019, though he won the belt at an event in Japan. The last non-Thai fighter to win the belt was France's Jimmy Vienot in 2019 at middleweight. A number of non-Thais have achieved top 10 rankings within the stadium. Ramon Dekkers was one of the most renowned foreign fighters in Lumpinee history, but he never won the Lumpinee belt. Stéphane Nikiéma would have been the second foreign Lumpinee champion, but his title fight ended in a no-contest.

== Current champions ==
Weight Class	Champion	Date won	Days
Mini Flyweight	Vacant		0
Light Flyweight	Vacant		0
Flyweight	Vacant	-	-
Super Flyweight	Vacant		
Bantamweight	Vacant		
Super Bantamweight	Vacant		
Featherweight	Vacant	-	-
Super Featherweight	Khunpon Eakmuangnon	12 December 2023	1076
Lightweight	Kanongsuek Gor.Kampanat	29 April 2023	1303
Super Lightweight	Vacant	-	-
Welterweight	Vacant		
Super Welterweight	Kongthailand Kiatnavy	6 May 2023	1296
Middleweight	Denpanom Pran26	17 June 2023	1254

== Fighter of the Year history ==
Year	Fighter
1995	Samliam Singmanee
1996	Nungubon Sitlerchai
1997	Attachai Por.Samranchai
1998	Attachai Por.Samranchai
1999	Saenchai Sor.Khamsing
2000	Phet-Ek Sitjaopho
2001	
2002	Orono Wor Petchpun
2003	Singdam Kiatmuu9
2004	Pinsiam Sor.Amnuaysirichoke
2005	Nong-O Gaiyanghadao
2006	Norasing Lukbanyai
2007	Wuttidet Lukprabat
2008	Wuttidet Lukprabat
2009	Lekkla Thanasuranakorn
2010	Nong-O Gaiyanghadao
2011	Sam-A Gaiyanghadao
2012	Sangmanee Sor.Tienpo
2013	Yodwicha Por.Boonsit
2014	Superbank Mor Ratanabandit
2015	Ronachai Tor.Ramintra
2016	Muangthai P.K. Saenchaimuaythaigym
2017	Muangthai P.K. Saenchaimuaythaigym
2018	Tawanchai P.K. Saenchaimuaythaigym
2019	Nuenglanlek Jitmuangnon

== Championship history (incomplete) ==
=== Pinweight Championship ===
Weight limit: 102 lb (46.3 kg)

Name	Date	Defenses
(Thailand) Pitti Muangkhonkaen (def. Saknarinnoi Suansampran)	2 November 1976	
Inaugural champion.
(Thailand) Panmongkol Hor.Mahachai (def. Pitti Muangkhonkaen)	4 February 1977	
Panmongkol vacated the title in 1977.
(Thailand) Jakrawan Kiattisaktewan (def. Mongkoldej Sakwittaya)	10 February 1978	
Jakrawan vacated the title in 1978.
(Thailand) Hanuman Sitporluang (def. Somyot Sor.Thanyaburi)	18 July 1978	
(Thailand) Kongtoranee Payakaroon (def. Hanuman Sitporluang)	15 December 1978	def. Kingchai Phisanchai on 23 March 1979
(Thailand) Bangkhlanoi Sor.Thanikul (def. Kongtoranee Payakaroon)	26 June 1979	
Bangkhlanoi vacated the title in 1979.
(Thailand) Samart Payakaroon (def. Kongsamut Sor.Thanikul)	11 February 1980	def. Paruhatlek Sitchunthong on 7 June 1980
(Thailand) Chamuekpet Hapalang (def. Samart Payakaroon)	8 August 1980	def. Paruhatlek Sitchunthong on 23 September 1980
(Thailand) Ruengchai Thairungruang (def. Chamuekpet Hapalang)	9 January 1981	
(Thailand) Wisanupon Saksamut (def. Ruengchai Thairungruang)	14 July 1981	
Wisanupon vacated the title in 1982.
(Thailand) Paruhatlek Sitchunthong (def. Tor Kiattisakkongka)	22 December 1981	def. Nopachai Lukmingkwan on 12 March 1982
(Thailand) Palannoi Kiatanan (def. Paruhatlek Sitchunthong)	21 May 1982	
Palannoi vacated the title in 1982.
(Thailand) Paruhatlek Sitchunthong (2) (def. Chakphetnoi Sitsei)	7 December 1982	def. Kaophong Sitmorbon on 7 January 1983
Paruhatlek vacated the title in 1983 and the Pinweight championship was later discontinued.

=== Mini Flyweight Championship ===
Weight limit: 105 lb (47.6 kg)

Name	Date	Defenses
(Thailand) Sittichai Monsongkhram (def. Pongdet Chomputhong)	30 March 1983	
Inaugural champion.
(Thailand) Saencherng Pinsinchai (def. Pongdet Chomputhong)	11 November 1983	
Saencherng vacated the title upon winning it in 1983.
(Thailand) Dennuea Denmolee (def. Sittichai Monsongkhram)	29 June 1984	def. Wangchannoi Sor.Palangchai on 22 June 1985.
Dennuea vacated the title in 1986.
(Thailand) Pungluang Kiatanan (def. Saeksan Sitjomthong)	29 November 1986	
(Thailand) Hippy Singmanee (def. Pungluang Kiatanan)	19 December 1986	def. Saeksan Sitjomthong on 6 February 1987.
Hippy was stripped of the title following a knockout loss to Langsuan Panyuthaphum in a non-title fight on 31 July 1987.
(Thailand) Saeksan Sitjomthong (def. Morakot Sor.Tamarangsri)	22 September 1987	
(Thailand) Hippy Singmanee (2) (def. Saeksan Sitjomthong)	26 January 1988	
Hippy vacated the title in 1988.
(Thailand) Pairojnoi Sor.Siamchai (def. Kompayak Singmanee)	30 August 1988	def. Kompayak Singmanee on 2 May 1989.
Pairojnoi vacated the title in 1989.
(Thailand) Saengdao Kiatanan (def. Jaroensap Kiatbanchong)	1989	
(Thailand) Kompayak Singmanee (def. Saengdao Kiatanan)	6 February 1990	
(Thailand) Nungubon Sitlerchai (def. Kompayak Singmanee)	30 March 1990	
(Thailand) Thongchai Tor.Silachai (def. Nungubon Sitlerchai)	21 August 1990	def. Methanoi Sor.Maliwan on 1 December 1990.
Thongchai vacated the title in 1991.
(Thailand) Kompayak Singmanee (2) (def. Khanunphet Johnnygym)	12 July 1991	def. Chingchai Sakdaroon on 3 September 1991.
(Thailand) Rattanachai Wor.Walapol (def. Kompayak Singmanee)	12 October 1991	
(Thailand) Daoswing Kiattratphol (def. Rattanachai Wor.Walapol)	26 November 1991	
Daoswing vacated the title in 1992.
(Thailand) Kompayak Singmanee (3) (def. Pichitnoi Singbangprachan)	31 October 1992	def. Pichitnoi Singbangprachan on 19 January 1993.; def. Singsamphan Kiatsingnoi on 5 March 1993.
Kompayak vacated the title in 1994.
(Thailand) Singsamphan Kiatsingnoi (def. Netnarin Fairtex)	4 March 1994	def. Khumsap Phetmuangkhon on 29 April 1994.
(Thailand) Kongka Nor.Nakpathom (def. Singsamphan Kiatsingnoi)	28 June 1994	def. Singsamphan Kiatsingnoi on 29 July 1994.; def. Samliam Singmanee on 9 September 1994.
(Thailand) Chaichana Dechtawee (def. Kongka Nor.Nakpathom)	1994	
(Thailand) Sod Looknongyangtoy (def. Chaichana Dechtawee)	17 December 1994	
(Thailand) Samliam Singmanee (def. Singsamphan Kiatsingnoi)	26 August 1995	def. Singsamphan Kiatsingnoi on 26 September 1995.; def. Ekkachai Or.Chaibadan on 8 December 1995.
(Thailand) Ekkachai Or.Chaibadan (def. Samliam Singmanee)	9 July 1996	
Ekkachai vacated the title in 1997.
(Thailand) Saenliem Payakaroon (def. Therdthai Leksarina)	19 April 1997	def. Kratainoi Sitjephayao on 14 June 1997
(Thailand) Kraithong Monsaichon (def. Saenliem Payakaroon)	1 August 1997	
(Thailand) Chalamkhao Kiatpanthong (def. Kraithong Monsaichon)	23 September 1997	
(Thailand) Yodsaenchai Sityodtong (def. Chalamkhao Kiatpanthong)	4 November 1997	def. Kraithong Monsaichol on 9 December 1997
(Thailand) Nongbee Kiatyongyut (def. Yodsaenchai Sor.Wanna)	21 August 1998	
Nongbee vacated the title in 1998.
(Thailand) Paruhatnoi Sor.Jaroensuk (def. Yodpradab Daopaedriew)	29 September 1998	
Paruhatnoi vacated the titile in 1999.
(Thailand) Policenoi Sor.Ratchadaphon (def. Rungrit Sitchamlong)	11 May 1999	
(Thailand) Rungrit Sitchamlong (def. Policenoi Sor.Ratchadaphon)	1999	
(Thailand) Pornsawan Por.Pramuk (def. Rungrit Sitchamlong)	2 October 1999	def. Daophrasuk Sitpafa on 25 April 2000; def. Yodsaenchai Sor.Sakulphan on 8 September 2000
Pornsawan vacated the title in 2000.
(Thailand) Rakkiat Kiatpraphat (def. )		
(Thailand) Kaewfanoi Sor.Ratchadaporn (def. )		
(Thailand) Sayannoi Kiatprapat (def. )		
(Thailand) Jomyut Pitakkruchaidaen (def. )	2001-2002	
(Thailand) Dejdamrong Sor.Amnuaysirichoke (def. Jomyut Pitakkruchaidaen)	13 August 2002	
(Thailand) Palangpon Piriyanoppachai (def. Chatchai Sor.Thanayong)	22 August 2003	
(Thailand) Nattapon Por.Pernruamsang (def. Palangpon Piriyanoppachai)	28 November 2003	
Nuttapon vacated the title in 2004.
(Thailand) Chaiyo Soonkalabannon (def. Numpetch Sor.Tantip)	20 July 2004	
Chaiyo vacated the title in 2004.
(Thailand) Yedgoen Tor.Chalermchai (def. )	2000s	
(Thailand) Rattanadet Tor.Pansit (def. Fahpratan Or.Saengtawee)	6 May 2005	def. Chaiphonnoi Por.Thayida on 10 June 2005.
(Thailand) Nakrobdam Tor.Bangsean (def. Rattanadet Tor.Pansit)	21 October 2005	def. Namphet Sor.Tantip on 9 December 2005.
Nakrobdam vacated the title in 2006.
(Thailand) Wanheng Menayothin (def. Khunponjiew Siangsawanpanpa)	2 June 2006	def. Namphet Sor.Tantip on 2 August 2006.; def. Jomhod Eminentair on 22 September 2006.
Wanheng vacated the title in 2007.
(Thailand) Kongmuangchan Or.Benjamas (def. )	2007	
(Thailand) Rungphet Wor.Sangprapai (def. Kongmuangchan Or.Benjamas)	8 June 2007	def. Jomhod Eminentair on 7 September 2007.
Rungphet vacated the title in 2007.
(Thailand) Nongnan Kiatpathum (def. Wanheng Menayothin)	12 December 2007	
Nongnan vacated the title in 2008.
(Thailand) Wanchai Sor.Kittisak (def. Nongbonlek Sitmutu)	28 March 2008	
(Thailand) Thanusuklek Or.Kwanmuang (def. Wanchai Sor.Kittisak)	4 July 2008	def. Moo4 Sit Tor on 13 January 2009.
(Thailand) Weerachai Wor.Wiwattanon (def. Thanusuklek Or.Kwanmuang)	6 March 2009	def. Choknamchai Sitjakung on 8 December 2009.
Weerachai vacated the title in 2010.
(Thailand) Wanchai Sor.Kittisak (2) (def. Prakaypet Singklonchon)	5 March 2010	
(Thailand) Phetmorakot Wor.Sangprapai (def. Wanchai Sor.Kittisak)	25 March 2011	
Phetmorakot vacated the title in 2011.
(Thailand) Sangmanee Sor.Tienpo (def. Phet Lukmakhamwan)	6 April 2012	
Sangmanee vacated the title in 2012.
(Thailand) Satanmuanglek Windysport (def. Newlukrak Pagonponsurin)	7 June 2013	
Satanmuanglek vacated the title in 2013.
(Thailand) Newlukrak Pagonponsurin (2) (def. Tukatathong Por.Thairungruang)	28 February 2014	
Newlukrak vacated the title in 2014.
(Thailand) Ongree Sor.Dechaphan (def. Wanpichit Menayothin)	5 September 2014	
Ongree was stripped of the title when he pulled out of his first scheduled title defense in December 2014.
(Thailand) Ronachai Santi-Ubon (def. Senpayak Por.Jaroenphet)	9 December 2014	
Ronachai vacated the title in 2015.
(Thailand) Petchrung Sitsornong (def. Ongree Sor.Dechaphan)	5 June 2015	
Phetrung vacated the title in 2015.
(Thailand) Nangoen Lukjaomesaivaree (def. Koko Paeminburi)	4 March 2016	
Nongoen vacated the title in 2017.
(Thailand) Saksri Kiatmuu9 (def. Seeoui Singmawynn)	8 September 2017	
Saksri vacated the title in 2018.
(Thailand) Hercules Phetsimean (def. Samuenthep Por.Petchsiri)	5 June 2018	
Hercules vacated the title in 2018.
(Thailand) Samuenthep Por.Phetsiri (def. Ittipon Singmawin)	30 November 2018	
Samuenthep vacated the title in 2019.
(Japan) Nadaka Yoshinari (def. Singdam Kafaefocus)	14 April 2019	
Yoshinari vacated the title in 2019.
(Thailand) Pon Parunchai (def. Phetmalai Phetjaroenvit)	6 December 2019	
Pon vacated the title in 2020. The title was retired between 2021 and 2023 following the COVID-19 pandemic.

=== Light Flyweight Championship ===
Weight limit: 108 lb (49.0 kg)

Name	Date	Defenses
(Thailand) Seree Luknongchok (def. Kring Sit-Amphon)	21 March 1969	
Inaugural champion.
(Thailand) Saman Lukbanpho (def. Seree Luknongchok)	20 May 1969	
(Thailand) Raknoi Charoenmuang (def. Saman Lukbanpho)	26 September 1969	
Raknoi vacated the title in 1970.
(Thailand) Seree Luknongchok (def. Saman Lukbanpho)	16 October 1970	
(Thailand) Khotchasannoi Phoncharoen (def. Seree Luknongchok)	29 January 1971	
(Thailand) Daothong Sityodthong (def. Khotchasannoi Phoncharoen)	4 June 1971	
(Thailand) Orachunnoi Hor.Mahachai (def. Daothong Sityodthong)	5 December 1971	
(Thailand) Sorphikhat Siharatdecho (def. Orachunnoi Hor.Mahachai)	February 1973	
(Thailand) Denthoraneenoi Luedthaksin (def. Sorphikhat Siharatdecho)	26 July 1973	
Denthoraneenoi vacated the title in 1974.
(Thailand) Yoddet Singsornthong (def. Orachunnoi Hor.Mahachai)	1974	def. Orachunnoi Hor.Mahachai on 11 December 1975; def. Chanchai Na Paedriew on 3 September 1976
(Thailand) Orachunnoi Hor.Mahachai (2) (def. Yoddet Singsornthong)	November 1976	def. Sornarai Sakwittaya on 17 June 1977
(Thailand) Sornarai Sakwittaya (def. Orachunnoi Hor.Mahachai)	1978	
Sornarai vacated the title in 1979.
(Thailand) Khunponnoi Sitprasang (def. Kongtoranee Payakaroon)	2 November 1979	
Khunponnoi vacated the title in 1980.
(Thailand) Kongtoranee Payakaroon (def. Khiopit Chuwattana)	22 February 1980	def. Bangkhlanoi Sor.Thanikul on 6 June 1980; def. Fonluang Looksadetmaepuangtong on 29 July 1980
Kongtoranee vacated the title in 1980.
(Thailand) Samart Payakaroon (def. Poolap Sakniran)	11 November 1980	
(Thailand) Bangkhlanoi Sor.Thanikul (def. Makhamphet Rojsongkhram)	31 March 1981	
Bangkhlanoi vacated the title in 1981.
(Thailand) Chamuekpet Hapalang (def. Narak Sipkraysi)	23 October 1981	
Chamuekpet vacated the title in 1982.
(Thailand) Wisanupon Saksamut (def. Makhamphet Rojsongkram)	12 March 1982	
Wisanupon vacated the title in 1982.
(Thailand) Paruhatlek Sitchunthong (def. Saengphet Lukwatpailor)	12 March 1983	def. Yungnongkhai Sitwaiwat on 12 July 1983; draws with Chanchai Sor.Tamarangsri on 30 April 1983; draws with Detduang Por.Pongsawang on 1 January 1985; def. Odnoi Lookprabat on 3 April 1985
(Thailand) Odnoi Lookprabat (def. Paruhatlek Sitchunthong)	26 July 1985	
Odnoi vacated the title in 1985.
(Thailand) Paruhatlek Sitchunthong (def. Fahlan Lookprabat)	7 December 1985	
(Thailand) Supernoi Sitchokchai (def. Paruhatlek Sitchunthong)	18 January 1986	
Supernoi vacated the title in 1986.
(Thailand) Jockynoi Na Nongkae (def. Kongsak Sitsamtahan)	3 June 1986	
(Thailand) Boonkerd Fairtex (def. Jockynoi Na Nongkae)	29 July 1986	
(Thailand) Petchan Sakwichan (def. Boonkerd Fairtex)	14 October 1986	
(Thailand) Namphon Nongkeepahuyuth (def. Petchan Sakwichan)	25 November 1986	
(Thailand) Wangchannoi Sor.Palangchai (def. Namphon Nongkeepahuyuth)	19 December 1986	
Wangchannoi vacated the title in 1987.
(Thailand) Langsuan Panyuthaphum (def. Dennuea Denmolee)	19 May 1987	
Langsuan vacated the title in 1988.
(Thailand) Hippy Singmanee (def. Karuhat Sor.Supawan)	30 August 1988	def. Namkabuan Nongkeepahuyuth on 11 July 1989; def. Chainoi Muangsurin on 8 September 1989
(Thailand) Tukatathong Por.Pongsawang (def. Hippy Singmanee)	30 March 1990	
(Thailand) Kruekchai Kiatyongyut (def. Tukatathong Por.Pongsawang)	31 August 1990	
Kruekchai vacated the title in 1991.
(Thailand) Thongchai Tor.Silachai (def. Morakot Sor.Tamarangsri)	2 July 1991	def. Khanunphet Johnnygym on 7 February 1992; def. Rattanachai Wor.Warapol on 11 September 1992
Thongchai vacated the title in 1992.
(Thailand) Nongnarong Luksamrong (def. Samkor Chor.Rathchatasupak)	25 September 1992	
Nongnarong vacated the title in 1994.
(Thailand) Saenkeng Sor.Werakul (def. Netnarin Fairtex)	12 June 1994	def. Kaolan Kaovichit on 15 October 1995
Saenkeng vacated the title in 1996.
(Thailand) Rungrawee Sor.Ploenchit (def. Namsaknoi Yudthagarngamtorn)	23 August 1996	
Rungrawee vacated the title in 1997.
(Thailand) Lertchai Kiatbodin (def. Lukkrokphet Kiatpramuk)	30 September 1997	
(Thailand) Chalamkhao Kiatpanthong (def. Lertchai Kiatbodin)	23 January 1998	
(Thailand) Ronnachai Naratreekul (def. Chalamkhao Kiatpanthong)	12 June 1998	
(Thailand) Charnsak Singklongsi (def. Ronnachai Naratreekul)	21 August 1998	def. Dansiam Kiatrungrot on 29 September 1998
The title was vacant before Kongprai and Kraithong's fight.
(Thailand) Kongprai Payaklemon (def. Kraithong Monsaichon)	9 April 1999	def. Yodsaenchai Hollywoodpattaya on 8 May 1999
(Thailand) Paruhatnoi Sitjamee (def. Kongprai Por.Pinyo)	1999	
(Thailand) Khajornklai Por.Burapha (def. )	July 1999	
Khajornklai vacated the title in 1999.
(Thailand) Yodradap Kiatphayathai (def. Phet-Ek Sitjaopho)	15 April 2000	
(Thailand) Chatchainoi Sitbenjama (def. )	2000	
(Thailand) Puja Sor.Suwanee (def. Chatchainoi Sitbenjama)	25 November 2000	
(Thailand) Thaweesak Singkhlongsi (def. Puja Sor.Suwanee)	19 December 2000	
(Thailand) Dejdamrong Sor Amnuaysirichoke (def. )	2001	
(Thailand) Chomyutphithak Khruchaidaen (def. )	2002	
(Thailand) Dejdamrong Sor Amnuaysirichoke (def. Chomyutphithak Khruchaidaen)	13 Aug 2002	
(Thailand) Daoprasuk Sitpaafaa (def. )	2003	
(Thailand) Suwitlek Kor.Sapaotong (def. Dejdamrong Sor Amnuaysirichoke)	9 December 2003	
(Thailand) Fahmeechai Boplaboonchu (def. Suwitlek Kor.Sapaotong)	23 November 2004	
Fahmechai vacated the title in 2005.
(Thailand) Suwitlek Kor.Sapaotong (2) (def. Chatchai Sor.Tanayong)	6 May 2005	
Suwitlek vacated the title in 2005.
(Thailand) Hualamphong Fonjangchonburi (def. Chalermpon Phetsupapan)	24 February 2006	
(Thailand) Norasing Lukbanyai (def. Hualamphong Fonjangchonburi)	2 June 2006	def. Fahmai F.A.Group on 14 July 2006
Norasing vacated the title in 2007.
(Thailand) Nongbeer Choknamwong (def. Silarit Sor.Suradej)	8 June 2007	
Nongbeer vacated the title upon winning it in 2007.
(Thailand) Khunponjew Seangsawangpanpla (def. Apidet Sor.Sommai)	7 September 2007	def. Rungphet Wor.Sangprapai on 7 December 2007
Khunponjew vacated the title in 2008.
(Thailand) Sripatanalak Sukasemresort (def. Narongdej Sor.Saknarong)	2 May 2008	
Sripatanalak vacated the title in 2008.
(Thailand) Lekkom Sor.Wongsawas (def. Superbank Or.Kwanmuang)	7 November 2008	
Lekkom vacated the title in 2009.
(Thailand) Khunsuk P.N.Gym (def. Superbank Or.Kwanmuang)	2009	
(Thailand) Wanchalong Sitsornong (def. Khunsuk P.N.Gym)	8 December 2009	
(Thailand) Mongkolchai Kwaitonggym (def. Wanchalong Sitsornong)	24 October 2010	
Mongkolchai vacated the title in 2011.
(Thailand) Lomtalay Sitsornong (def. Mondam Sor.Weerapon)	8 March 2011	
Lomtalay vacated the title in 2011.
(Thailand) Muangthai Sor.Bonnyiam (def. Kongburee Wor.Sungprapai)	March,9 2012	
Muangthai vacated the title in 2012.
(Thailand) Wanchai Sor.Kitisak (def. Sarawut Phithakpaphadaeng)	8 June 2012	
(Thailand) Sarawut Phithakpaphadaeng (def. Wanchai Sor.Kitisak)	7 September 2012	
(Thailand) Sam-D PetchyindeeAcademy (def. Sarawut Phithakpaphadaeng)	7 December 2012	
(Thailand) Chaisiri Sakniranrat (def. Sam-D PetchyindeeAcademy)	29 March 2013	def. Petmanee Sitsarawatjirapong on 6 September 2013
Chaisiri vacated the title in 2013.
(Thailand) Wanchai Kiatmuu9 (2) (def. Detkart Por.Pongsawang)	3 December 2013	
Wanchai vacated the title in 2014.
(Thailand) Wanchai Kiatmuu9 (3) (def. Satanmuanglek Numponthep)	6 March 2015	
Wanchai vacated the title in 2015.
(Thailand) Satanmuanglek Numponthep (def. Sam-D Petchyindee Academy)	25 December 2015	
Satanmuanglek vacated the title in 2016.
(Thailand) Satanmuanglek Numponthep (2) (def. Jaroenpon Poptheeratham)	2 September 2016	
Satanmuanglek vacated the title in 2017.
(Thailand) Phetphuthai Sitsarawatseua (def. Phettarue Sidakobwatsaduphan)	7 November 2017	
Phetphuthai vacated the title in 2018.
(Thailand) Wanchainoi Sitsarawatseur (def. Saenchainoi Thanaimichel)	5 June 2018	
Wanchainoi vacated the title in 2019.
(Thailand) Nompraew Torachathan (def. Tubtimthong SorJor.Lekmuangnon)	10 May 2019	
(Thailand) Rak Erawan (def. Singhalek Sor.Chokmeechai)	6 December 2019	
Rak vacated the title in 2020.

=== Flyweight Championship ===
Weight limit: 112 lb (50.8 kg)

Name	Date	Defenses
(Thailand) Ponchai Rattanasit (def. Adul Srisothon)	22 June 1957	
Inaugural champion
(Thailand) Suchat Srisothon (def. Payaknoi Klongpachon)	1960s	
Suchat is said to be the 10th Flyweight champion.
Saenchai Teodthai and Khunpan Muangthong fought to a draw for the vacant title on 8 January 1963.
(Thailand) Kingthong Ariphai (def.)	1964	
(Thailand) Berkrerk Chartvanchai (def. Kingthong Ariphai)	4 August 1964	def. Phaedcha Srichantopas on 3 November 1964
(Thailand) Baiyok Laemfapha (def. Berkrerk Chartvanchai)	1965	
The title was vacant as of 1966.
(Thailand) Kraisorn Singkongka (def. )	1966	
Kraisorn vacated the title in 1966.
(Thailand) Rattanasak Wayupak (def. Samingthong Jeeraphan)	25 October 1966	
Rattanasak vacated the title in 1967.
(Thailand) Wichannoi Porntawee (def. Samingthong Jeeraphan)	31 October 1967	def. Samingthong Jeeraphan on 5 April 1968
Vicharnnoi vacated the title in 1968.
(Thailand) Klairung Lukjaomaesaithong (def. Kangwanprai Singkasempol)	1970	
(Thailand) Pudpadnoi Worawut (def. Kiatpatum Phanphang-nga)	29 January 1971	
Pudpadnoi vacated the title in 1971.
(Thailand) Dejsuphan Hollywood (def. Kotchasarnoi Pholcharoen)	29 September 1972	
(Thailand) Seree Luknongchok (def. )	1973	
(Thailand) Ruengsak Porntawee (def. Daonin Singasawin)	12 March 1974	
Ruengsak vacated the title in 1974.
(Thailand) Rojanadet Rojanasongkram (def. )	1975	
The title was vacant as of 1 July 1979.
(Thailand) Piti Muangkhonkaen (def. Thong Petchyindee)	31 July 1979	
(Thailand) Sornnarai Sakwitthaya (def. Piti Muangkhonkaen)	18 September 1979	
(Thailand) Singtong Prasopchai (def. Sornnarai Sakwitthaya)	6 June 1980	
(Thailand) Kongtoranee Payakaroon (def. Singtong Prasopchai)	23 September 1980	def. Fahkamram Sitponthep on 4 September 1981; def. Chamuekpet Hapalang on 12 March 1982
(Thailand) Chamuekpet Hapalang (def. Kongtoranee Payakaroon)	22 June 1982	
Chamuekpet vacated the title in 1982.
(Thailand) Palannoi Kiatanan (def. Yongyuthnoi Sakchaiyasit)	12 July 1982	
Palannoi vacated the title in 1983.
(Thailand) Petchdam Lukborai (def. Makhamphet Rojasongkhram)	11 November 1983	
Title was vacant as of 1984.
(Thailand) Saencherng Pinsinchai (def. Klaisapthaphee Majestic)	20 April 1984	
Saencherng vacated the title in 1984.
(Thailand) Daoden Sor.Sakkasem (def. Songatchai Singhkiri)	31 August 1984	
(Thailand) Wisanupon Saksamut (def. Phanrit Luksrirat)	2 April 1985	
(Thailand) Ruensagknoi Por.Phet (def. Wisanupon Saksamut)	4 June 1985	
(Thailand) Wisanupon Saksamut (def. Ruensagknoi Por.Phet)	27 August 1985	
Wisanupon was stripped of the title on 18 July 1986, after being dismissed by the referee during a title defense against Odnoi Lukprabat.
(Thailand) Burklerk Pinsinchai (def. Odnoi Lukprabat)	9 September 1986	def. Paruhatlek Sitchunthong on 25 November 1986
(Thailand) Kwayrong Sit Samthahan (def. Burklerk Pinsinchai)	6 February 1987	
(Thailand) Burklerk Pinsinchai (2) (def. Kwayrong Sit Samthahan)	24 July 1987	
(Thailand) Dokmaipa Por.Pongsawang (def. Burklerk Pinsinchai)	28 August 1987	def. Wangchannoi Sor.Palangchai on 26 January 1988
Dokmaipa vacated the title in 1988.
(Thailand) Paruhatlek Sitchunthong (def. Detduang Por.Pongsawang)	3 May 1988	
(Thailand) Kaensak Sor.Ploenjit (def. Paruhatlek Sitchunthong)	2 May 1989	
Kaensak vacated the title in 1989.
(Thailand) Thanooin Chor.Chuchart (def. Panphet Muangsurin)	8 September 1989	
(Thailand) Karuhat Sor.Supawan (def. Pairojnoi Sor.Siamchai)	10 April 1990	
(Thailand) Chainoi Muangsurin (def. Karuhat Sor.Supawan)	29 June 1990	
(Thailand) Jaroensap Kiatbanchong (def. Chainoi Muangsurin)	31 August 1990	def. Chainoi Muangsurin on 7 October 1990; def. Pairojnoi Sor.Siamchai on 23 February 1991
(Thailand) Langsuan Panyuthaphum (def. Jaroensap Kiatbanchong)	31 May 1991	
(Thailand) Nungubon Sitlerchai (def. Langsuan Panyuthaphum)	6 August 1991	
Nungubon vacated the title in 1991.
(Thailand) Karuhat Sor.Supawan (def. Jaroensap Kiatbanchong)	4 November 1991	
The title was contested for in New Zealand and was named the "International Lumpinee Stadium title". The title vacant as of 1992.
(Thailand) Daoswing Manwood (def. Sukhothai Sasiprapagym)	31 October 1992	
Daoswing vacated the title in 1993.
(Thailand) Wangthong Por.Pisitchet (def. Thongchai Tor.Silachai)	9 July 1993	
(Thailand) Thongchai Tor.Silachai (def. Wangthong Por.Pisitchet)	2 October 1993	def. Rittidet Sor.Ploenjit on 30 November 1993; def. Netnarin Fairtex in 1994
(Thailand) Sittichai Petchbangprang (def. Thongchai Tor.Silachai)	23 May 1995	
(Thailand) Nuengsiam Fairtex (def. Sittichai Petchbangprang)	4 August 1995	
(Thailand) Nuengpichit Sityodtong (def. Neungsiam Fairtex)	13 October 1995	def. Sittichai Petchbangprang on 17 December 1995; def. Sakpaitoon on 10 February 1996; def. Charanthong Ruamjaipuen on 24 September 1996
(Thailand) Namsaknoi Yudthagarngamtorn (def. Nuengpichit Sityodtong)	15 February 1997	
Namsaknoi vacated the title in 1997.
(Thailand) Khunponsuk Kwansongchai (def. )	1990s	
(Thailand) Ekachai Or.Chaibadan (def. Saenchai Sor.Kingstar)	28 November 1997	
(Thailand) Khunpinit Kiattawan (def. Ekachai Or.Chaibadan)	1998	def. Ekachai Or.Chaibadan in 1998
(Thailand) Chalamkhao Kiatpanthong (def. Khunpinit Kiattawan)	8 September 1998	def. Ekachai Or.Chaibadan on 13 November 1998
(Thailand) Dansiam Kiatrungroj (def. Chalamkhao Kiatpanthong)	5 March 1999	
(Thailand) Petch Por.Burapha (def. Dansiam Kiatrungroj)	17 August 1999	
(Thailand) Phet-Ek Sitjaopho (def. Petch Por.Burapha)	18 July 2000	
Phet-Ek vacated the title in 2000.
(Thailand) Wisanlek Sor.Thosapol (def. )	2001	
(Thailand) Hansuk Wor.Sunthonnon (def. )	2003	
(Thailand) Namsuk Phetsupaphan (def. Hansuk Wor.Sunthonnon)	8 August 2003	
(Thailand) Panomroonglek Kiatmuu9 (def. Namsuk Phetsupaphan)	14 September 2003	
Panomrunglek vacated the title in 2004.
(Thailand) Terdthailak Nakontongparkview (def. Mongkonchai Phetsuphapan)	2 November 2004	def. Sagetdao Petpayathai on 12 April 2005
(Thailand) Oley Kor.Kittisakgym (def. Terdthailak Nakontongparkview)	24 February 2006	
Oley vacated the title in 2006.
(Thailand) Tingtong Siangsawangpanpa (def. Terdthailak Nakontongparkview)	7 July 2006	
(Thailand) Somboonbaeb Sor.Phumpanmuang (def. Tingtong Siangsawangpanpa)	22 September 2006	
(Thailand) Norasing Lukbanyai (def. Somboonbaeb Sor.Phumpanmuang)	2 March 2007	
(Thailand) Chatchai Sor.Thanayrong (def. Norasing Lukbanyai)	3 April 2007	def. Nongbeer Choknamwong on 14 September 2007
Chatchai vacated the title in 2007.
(Thailand) Pongsiri Por.Siripong (def. Norasing Lukbanyai)	7 December 2007	
Pongsiri vacated the title in 2008.
(Thailand) Rungphet Wor.Sangprapai (def. Nongbeer Choknamwong)	29 February 2008	
Rungphet vacated the title in 2008.
(Thailand) Khunponjiew Saengsawangphanpla (def. Yodpet Wor.Sungprapai)	31 October 2008	
Khunponjiew vacated the title in 2009.
(Thailand) Norasing Lukbanyai (def. Phetmorakot Teeded99)	5 June 2009	
(Thailand) Krittongkham Tor.Surachet (def. Norasing Lukbanyai)	4 September 2009	def. Kongfah Sor.Werapon on 8 December 2009
(Thailand) Ekmongkon Kaiyanghadaogym (def. Krittongkham Tor.Surachet)	5 March 2010	def. Dejsakda Wor.Sangprapai on 4 February 2011
Ekmmongkon vacated the title in 2011.
(Thailand) Pentai Sitnumnoi (def. Mondam Sor.Weerapon)	9 March 2012	
Pentai was stripped of the title for losing by knockout to Ruengsak Sitniwat on 7 July 2013.
(Thailand) Pentai Sitnumnoi (2) (def. Yangthon Sitpanon)	6 September 2013	
(Thailand) Saknarinnoi Or.Aunsuwan (def. Pentai Sitnumnoi)	6 June 2014	
Saknarinnoi vacated the title in 2015.
(Thailand) Khunhanlek Kiatjaroenchai (def. Watcharaphon P.K.Senchai)	4 September 2015	
(Thailand) Ronachai Santi-Ubon (def. Sarawut SorJor.Wichitpaedriew)	3 June 2016	
(Thailand) Kiewpayak Jitmuangnon (def. Ronachai Santi-Ubon)	2 September 2016	
Kiewpayak vacated the title in 2016.
(Thailand) Kiew Parunchai (def. Banlungngoen Sawansangmanja)	7 March 2017	
(Thailand) Ongree Sor.Dechaphan (def. Kiew Parunchai)	9 June 2017	
(Thailand) Kompetch Sitsarawatsuer (def. Ongree Sor.Dechaphan)	3 April 2018	
(Thailand) Kiew Parunchai (2) (def. Kompetch Sitsarawatsuer)	1 May 2018	def. Kazuki Osaki on 15 June 2018
Kiew vacated the title in 2018.
(Thailand) Samuenthep Por Petchsiri (def. Nuapetch KelaSport)	24 September 2019	def. Yod Parunchai on 14 January 2020

=== Super Flyweight Championship ===
Weight limit: 115 lb (52.2 kg)

Name	Date	Defenses
(Thailand) Samart Payakaroon (def. Singthong Prasopchai)	31 March 1981	
Inaugural champion. Samart vacated the title in 1981.
(Thailand) Fonluang Luksadetmaepuanthong (def. Fakhamram Lukphrabat)	15 January 1982	
(Thailand) Wisanupon Saksamut (def. Fonluang Luksadetmaepuanthong)	22 June 1982	drew with Bangkhlanoi Sor.Thanikul on 12 March 1982
(Thailand) Sornsilp Sitnoenphayom (def. Wisanupon Saksamut)	7 December 1982	
Sornsilp vacated the title in 1983.
(Thailand) Kongtoranee Payakaroon (def. Pornsaknoi Sitchang)	5 April 1983	def. Rung Sakprasong on 26 August 1983
Kongtoranee vacated the title in 1983.
(Thailand) Phayanoi Sor.Thasanee (def. Kanongsuk Sit-Omnoi)	28 February 1984	def. Kanongsuk Sit-Omnoi on 17 August 1984; def. Chamuekpet Hapalang on 18 October 1984; def. Paiboon Fairtex on 29 October 1985
(Thailand) Phanrit Luksrirat (def. Phayanoi Sor.Thasanee)	18 January 1986	
Phanrit vacated the title in 1986.
(Thailand) Kwayrong Sitsamthahan (def. Lookiat Muangsurin)	18 July 1986	
(Thailand) Rung Sakprasong (def. Kwayrong Sitsamthahan)	17 October 1986	
(Thailand) Phanrit Luksrirat (2) (def. Rung Sakprasong)	19 December 1986	
(Thailand) Phayanoi Sor.Thasanee (2) (def. Phanrit Luksrirat)	11 August 1987	
(Thailand) Jaroenthong Kiatbanchong (def. Phayanoi Sor.Thasanee)	29 December 1987	
(Thailand) Wisanupon Saksamut (2) (def. Jaroenthong Kiatbanchong)	26 January 1988	
(Thailand) Dokmaipa Por.Pongsawang (def. Wisanupon Saksamut)	31 May 1988	
(Thailand) Langsuan Panyuthaphum (def. Dokmaipa Por.Pongsawang)	2 May 1989	drew with Kaensak Sor.Ploenjit on 5 September 1989
(Thailand) Boonlai Sor.Thanikul (def. Langsuan Panyuthaphum)	19 January 1990	def. Oley Kiatoneway on 24 April 1990
(Thailand) Oley Kiatoneway (def. Boonlai Sor.Thanikul)	8 June 1990	def. Karuhat Sor.Supawan on 7 October 1990
Oley vacated the title in 1991.
(Thailand) Langsuan Panyuthaphum (2) (def. Lamnamoon Sor.Sumalee)	7 July 1992	
(Thailand) Jaroensap Kiatbanchong (def. Langsuan Panyuthaphum)	7 August 1992	drew with Lamnamoon Sor.Sumalee on 6 November 1992
(Thailand) Lamnamoon Sor.Sumalee (def. Jaroensap Kiatbanchong)	30 April 1993	def. Rittidet Sor.Ploenchit on 13 July 1993
Lamnamoon vacated the title in 1993.
(Thailand) Nongnarong Luksamrong (def. Yokthai Sit Or)	10 June 1994	
(Thailand) Yokthai Sit Or (def. Nongnarong Luksamrong)	19 July 1994	
Yokthai vacated the title in 1994.
(Thailand) Nungubon Sitlerchai (def. Yodsiam Sor.Prantalay)	28 April 1995	
Nungubon vacated the title in 1995.
(Thailand) Chailek Sittheppitak (def. DaoUdon Sor.Suchart)	17 October 1995	
(Thailand) Nongnarong Looksamrong (2) (def. Thongchai Tor.Silachai)	26 March 1996	
(Thailand) Hantalay Sor.Ploenchit (def. Nongnarong Looksamrong)	9 July 1996	
The title became vacant when Hantalay died on 30 August 1996.
(Thailand) Kaolan Kaovichit (def. Thongchai Tor.Silachai)	24 September 1996	
Kaolan vacated the title in 1997.
(Thailand) Sod Looknongyangtoy (def. Pornpitak PhetUdomchai)	11 April 1997	
(Thailand) Densiam Lukprabat (def. Sod Looknongyangtoy)	27 July 1997	def. Nuengsiam Fairtex on 12 June 1998
Densiam vacated the title in 1998.
(Thailand) Saenchai Sor.Khamsing (def. Nuengsiam Fairtex)	21 July 1998	
(Thailand) Thongchai Tor.Silachai (def. Saenchai Sor.Khamsing)	12 September 1998	
(Thailand) Paruhatnoi Sitjamee (def. Thongchai Tor.Silachai)	3 March 2000	
The title was vacant as of March 2001.
(Thailand) (def. )		
(Thailand) Pettapee Chor Chinawong (def. )	2003	
Pettapee vacated the title in 2003.
(Thailand) Sudsakorn Tded99 (def. Visanlek Sor.Todsapon)	8 August 2003	def. Surachai Kiatsingnoi on 11 May 2004
Sudsakorn vacated the title in 2004.
(Thailand) Sam-A Tor.Rattanakiat (def. Petch Tor.Bangsaen)	7 December 2004	
(Thailand) Songkom Wor.Sangprapai (def. Sam-A Tor.Rattanakiat)	29 March 2005	def. Chaiyo Sunkilabaannon on 10 June 2005; def. Manasak Narupai on 21 October 2005
Songkom vacated the title in 2006.
(Thailand) Duangpichit Or.Siripon (def. Khongbeng Sor.Sakulphan)	31 March 2006	def. Rungruanglek Lukprabat on 21 April 2006
(Thailand) Detnarong Sitjaboon (def. Duangpichit Or.Siripon)	22 September 2006	def. Rungruanglek Lukprabat on 8 December 2006
(Thailand) Sam-A Tor.Rattanakiat (2) (def. Detnarong Sitjaboon)	2 March 2007	def. Kampichit Riflownasoundna on 8 June 2007; def. Chatchai Sor.Thonayong on 7 December 2007
Sam-A vacated the title in 2008.
(Thailand) Panomroonglek Kiatmuu9 (def. Pongsiri Por.Siripong)	28 March 2008	
Panomrunglek vacated the title in 2008.
(Thailand) Rungphet Wor Rungniran (def. Singdam Chockkanna)	6 March 2009	
Rungphet vacated the title in 2009.
(Thailand) Panomroonglek Kiatmuu9 (2) (def. Poonsawan Lukprabat)	5 March 2010	
(Thailand) Nuangthep Eminentair (def. Panomroonglek Kiatmuu9)	5 October 2010	
(Thailand) Chokpreecha Kor.Sakuncher (def. Nuangthep Eminentair)	2011	
(Thailand) Wanchalong Sitsornong (def. Chokprecha Kor.Sakuncha)	8 September 2011	def. Choknumchai Sitjakong on 8 August 2012
Wanchalong vacated the title in 2012.
(Thailand) Superlek Wor.Sangprapai (def. Muangthai Sor.Boonyiam)	7 September 2012	def. Sangmanee Sor Tienpo on 7 December 2012
Superlek vacated the title in 2013.
(Thailand) Yokphet Sompongmataput (def. Wanchalong Sitsornong)	5 February 2013	
(Thailand) Wanchalong Sitsornong (2) (def. Yokphet Sompongmataput)	6 September 2013	def. Panpayak Jitmuangnon on 8 April 2014
(Thailand) Kengkla Por.Pekko (def. Wanchalong Sitsornong)	9 December 2014	def. Arashi Fujihara on 5 April 2015; def. Jomhod Eminentair on 5 June 2015; def. Puenkol Diamond98 on 4 September 2015
(Thailand) Wanchalong PK.Saenchai (3) (def. Kengkla Por.Pekko)	3 June 2016	
Wanchalong vacated the title in 2017.
(Thailand) Kiew Parunchai (def. Watcharapon P.K.Saenchai)	6 March 2018	
Kiew vacated the title in 2018.
(Thailand) Rungnarai Kiatmuu9 (def. Jomhod Eminentair)	7 December 2018	def. Phetsommai Sor.Sommai on 8 September 2019
(Thailand) Chanalert Meenayothin (def. Rungnarai Kiatmuu9)	13 December 2019	
Chanalert vacated the title in 2020.

=== Bantamweight Championship ===
Weight limit: 118 lb (53.5 kg)

Name	Date	Defenses
(Thailand) Prasertchai Terdkiatpitak (def. Saknoi Charoenmuang)		
Inaugural champion.
(Thailand) Norasing Issaraphan (def. Lakchai Lukmatuli)	1960s	
(Thailand) Pairoj Payaksophon (def. Norasing Issaraphan)	5 February 1963	
(Thailand) Saenchai Terdthai (def. )	1964	
(Thailand) Lakchai Lukmatuli (def. Saenchai Terdthai)	4 August 1964	
(Thailand) Sornnarai Lukmahalok (def. )	1965–66	def. Kongsuriya Surarong on 8 March 1966
(Thailand) Berkrerk Chartvanchai (def. Lakchai Lukmatuli)	18 October 1966	def. Weerachon Lukngamsiri on 28 March 1967; def. Weerachon Lukngamsiri on 4 November 1967
Berkrerk vacated the title in 1967 in order to transition to Boxing.
(Thailand) Medprik Silachai (def. )	1970	
(Thailand) Klairung Lukjaomaesaitong (def. Chalermsak Ploenjit)	1971	
(Thailand) Chalermsak Ploenjit (def. )	1974	
(Thailand) Singnum Ekachai (def. Biya Lukthai)	1977	def. Piyadech Lukthai on 7 June 1977
(Thailand) Khaosod Sitpraprom (def. Singnoom Ekachai)	18 July 1978	
Khaosod vacated the title in 1978.
(Thailand) Paruhat Loh-ngoen (def. Thanasuk Prasopchai)	23 March 1979	def. Chokchainoi Sor.Chokprasert on 11 September 1979
(Thailand) Mafuang Weerapol (def. Paruhat Loh-ngoen)	22 January 1980	def. Kongtoranee Payakaroon on 2 December 1980; def. Fonluang Luksadetmaephuangtong on 4 September 1981; def. Jakrawan Kiattisaktewan on 12 March 1982
(Thailand) Bangkhlanoi Sor.Thanikul (def. Mafuang Weerapol)	24 August 1982	
(Thailand) Sornsilp Sitnoenpayom (def. Bangkhlanoi Sor.Thanikul)	5 April 1983	
(Thailand) Chamuekpet Hapalang (def. Sornsilp Sitnoenpayom)	26 August 1983	
(Thailand) Kongtoranee Payakaroon (def. Chamuekpet Hapalang)	31 January 1984	
(Thailand) Petchdam Lukborai (def. Kongtoranee Payakaroon)	14 September 1984	
(Thailand) Maewnoi Sitchang (def. Petchdam Lukborai)	8 February 1985	
(Thailand) Chanchai Sor.Tamarangsri (def. Maewnoi Sitchang)	4 June 1985	def. Petchdam Lukborai on 3 September 1985; def. Sanit Wichitkriengkrai on 11 October 1985
(Thailand) Sanit Wichitkriengkrai (def. Chanchai Sor.Tamarangsri)	18 January 1986	
Sanit was stripped of the title on 13 June 1986, after failing to make weight for a title defense against Phanrit Luksirat.
(Thailand) Chanchai Sor.Tamarangsri (2) (def. Phanrit Luksirat)	18 July 1986	def. Wanlop Sitnoknit on 19 December 1986
Chanchai vacated the title in 1987.
(Thailand) Yodpetch Sor.Jitpattana (def. Jampatong Na Nontachai)	25 August 1987	
(Thailand) Grandprixnoi Muangchaiyaphum (def. Yodpetch Sor.Jitpattana)	26 April 1988	
(Thailand) Saichon Pichitsuek (def. Grandprixnoi Muangchaiyaphum)	1989	
(Thailand) Kangwannoi Or.Sribualoi (def. Saichon Pichitsuek)	8 December 1989	def. Yodpetch Sor.Jitpattana on 11 May 1990
(Thailand) Taweesaklek Ploysakda (def. Kangwannoi Or.Sribualoi)	24 July 1990	def. Kangwannoi Or.Sribualoi on 7 September 1990
(Thailand) Saenklai SitKruOd (def. Taweesaklek Ploysakda)	18 June 1991	
(Thailand) Saenmuangnoi Lukchaopormahesak (def. Saenklai SitKruOd)	29 November 1991	
(Thailand) Jaroensak Kiatnakornchon (def. Saenmuangnoi Lukchaopormahesak)	31 March 1992	def. Saenmuangnoi Lukchaopormahesak on 2 June 1992
(Thailand) Yodkhunpon Sittraiphum (def. Jaroensak Kiatnakornchon)	8 December 1992	
(Thailand) Saenklai SitKruOd (2) (def. Yodkhunpon Sittraiphum)	27 April 1993	def. Jomhodlek Rattanachot on 10 August 1993; def. Anantasak Panyuthaphum on 7 December 1993; def. Singdam Or.Ukrit on 29 March 1994; draws with Dara-Ek Sitrungsap on 20 May 1994; def. Dara-Ek Sitrungsap on 7 June 1994; def. Singdam Or.Ukrit on 5 August 1994
(Thailand) Phetnamnueng Por.Chatchai (def. Saenklai SitKruOd)	17 February 1995	def. Saenklai SitKruOd on 9 May 1995
(Thailand) Kompayak SitKruOd (def. Phetnamnueng Por.Chatchai)	21 November 1995	
(Thailand) Petcharun Sor.Suwanpakdee (def. Kompayak SitKruOd)	4 June 1996	def. Jaruat Aborigine on 27 October 1996
(Thailand) Kompayak SitKruOd (2) (def. Petcharun Sor.Suwanpakdee)	21 January 1997	
(Thailand) Densiam Lukprabat (def. )	1998	def. Nuengsiam Fairtex on 12 June 1998
(Thailand) Sod Looknongyangtoy (def. Densiam Lukprabat)	28 August 1998	
(Thailand) Pornpitak PhetUdomchai (def. Sod Looknongyangtoy)	29 September 1998	
(Thailand) Saenchai Sor.Kingstar (def. Pornpitak PhetUdomchai)	5 February 1999	
(Thailand) Nungubon Sitlerchai (def. Saenchai Sor.Kingstar)	5 March 1999	
(Thailand) Saenchai Sor.Kingstar (def. Nungubon Sitlerchai)	23 April 1999	
Saenchai vacated the title in 1999.
(Thailand) Nongbee Kiatyongyut (def. Denthoranee Nakhonthongparkview)	25 April 2000	
Nongbee vacated the title in 2000.
(Thailand) Fahsuchon Sit-O (def. Nungubon Sitlerchai)	17 July 2001	
Thailand Pinsinchai (def. Fahsuchon Sit-O)	26 April 2002	
Petchmanee Petchsupapan (def. Thailand Pinsinchai)	31 January 2003	
(Thailand) Ngathao Attharungroj (def. Petchmanee Petchsupapan)	30 September 2003	
Ngathao vacated the title in 2004.
(Thailand) Pinsiam Sor.Amnuaysirichoke (def. Petchek Sitjawai)	17 August 2004	def. Anantachai Lukbanyai on 27 May 2005
(Thailand) Karnchai Kor.Bangkui (def. Pinsiam Sor.Amnuaysirichoke)	27 January 2006	
(Thailand) Rakkiat Kiatprapat (def. Karnchai Kor.Bangkui)	7 September 2007	
(Thailand) Petchboonchu FA Group (def. Rakkiat Kiatprapat)	7 December 2007	
Petchboonchu vacated the title in 2008.
(Thailand) Phuengnoi Phetsupaphan (def. Kompichit Riflowniasoundna)	2 May 2008	
Phuengnoi vacated the title in 2008.
(Thailand) Prab RiponeerSauna (def. Saenkeng Jor.Nopparat)	30 July 2008	
Prab vacated the title in 2009.
(Thailand) Lekkla Thanasuranakorn (def. Petchsiri Por.Siripong)	21 July 2009	
Lekkla vacated the title in 2009.
(Thailand) Rungruanglek Lukprabat (def. Rungphet Wor.Sangprapai)	8 December 2009	
Rungruanglek vacated the title in 2010.
(Thailand) Kaotam Lookprabaht (def. Rungphet Wor Rungniran)	8 March 2011	
Kaotam vacated the title in 2012.
(Thailand) Phetmorakot Teeded99 (def. Nutchai Pran26)	8 June 2012	
Phetmorakot vacated the title in 2012.
(Thailand) Chokpreecha Kor.Sakooncher (def. Satanfah Sagami)	8 January 2013	
(Thailand) Mondam Sor.Weerapon (def. Chokpreecha Kor.Sakooncher)	8 March 2013	
(Thailand) Superlek Kiatmuu9 (def. Mondam Sor.Weerapon)	7 June 2013	
Superlek vacated the title in 2013.
(Thailand) Suakim Sit Sor.Tor Taew (def. Mondam Sor.Weerapon)	6 September 2013	
(Thailand) Panpayak Jitmuangnon (def. Suakim Sit Sor.Tor Taew)	8 August 2014	
(Thailand) Prajanchai P.K.Saenchaimuaythaigym (def. Panpayak Jitmuangnon)	5 September 2014	
(Thailand) Panpayak Jitmuangnon (def. Prajanchai P.K.Saenchaimuaythaigym)	9 December 2014	
Panpayak vacated the title in 2015.
(Thailand) Kwanphet Sor.Suwanpakdee (def. Methee Sor.Jor.Toipedriew)	6 March 2015	
Kwanphet vacated the title in 2015.
(Thailand) Petchdam Petchyindee Academy (def. Khunhan Sitthongsak)	8 December 2015	
Pechdam vacated the title in 2016.
(Thailand) Kengkart Por.Pekko (def. Ponkit Tor.Aiewjaroentongpuket.)	30 August 2016	
Kengkart vacated the title in 2017.
(Thailand) Ronachai Tor.Ramintra (def. Kengkart Por.Pekko)	9 June 2017	
Ronachai vacated the title in 2017.
(Thailand) Superjeng Sor.Samangarment (def. Suesat Paeminburi)	8 September 2017	def. Aekwayu Mor.Krungthepthonburi on 8 December 2017
Superjeng vacated the title in 2018.
(Thailand) Kongsuk Sitsarawatsuer (def. Jakdao Wissanukollakan)	7 December 2018	
Kongsuk vacated the title in 2019.
(Thailand) Kompetch Sitsarawatsuer (def. Chokdee PK.Saenchaimuaythaigym)	10 August 2019	
Kompetch vacated the title in 2019.

=== Super Bantamweight Championship ===
Weight limit: 122 lb (55.3 kg)

Name	Date	Defenses
(Thailand) Saenchai Terdthai (def. )	1966–1967	
(Thailand) Mongkoldet Pitakchai (def. Saenchai Terdthai)	1966–1967	
The fight was later annulled and Mongkoldet removed as champion due to the Lumpinee Stadium committee's suspicion that Saenchai threw the fight.
(Thailand) Saifah Saengmorakot (def. Damluan Lukchaomaesaithong)	1970	def. Fahsai Taweechai on 29 May 1970
(Thailand) Poot Lorlek (def. Samyan Singsornthong)	29 January 1971	
Poot vacated the title in 1971.
(Thailand) Pudpadnoi Worawut (def. Suksawat Srithewet)	5 November 1971	
The title was vacant as of 1 May 1973.
(Thailand) Sommai Ekayothin (def. Rattana Lukprabat)	11 May 1973	
Sommai vacated the title in 1973.
(Thailand) Suratchai Singsamliam (def. Thepnarong Kiatsuriyah)	3 August 1973	
(Thailand) Sakphimai Ritwiboon (def. Chaiyaphum Sakwittaya)	11 February 1975	
(Thailand) Klairung Lukchaomaesaithong (def. Sakphimai Ritwiboon)	30 January 1976	def. Kanchai Ponthawee on 21 May 1976
(Thailand) Kanchai Ponthawee (def. )	1977	
Kanchai was stripped of the title when he missed weight for a title defense on 23 September 1977.
(Thailand) Saknarongnoi Chor.Chutirat (def. Inseenoi Sor.Thanikul)	18 November 1977	def. Singnum Ekkachai on 11 April 1978
Saknarongnoi was stripped of the title when he was dismissed during a title defense against Nueasila Na Bankhod in 1978.
(Thailand) Lom-Isan Sor.Thanikul (def. Nakhonsawan Suamisakawa)	29 June 1980	def. Krongsak Sakkasem on 22 July 1980
(Thailand) Saengsakda Kittikasem (def. Lom-Isan Sor.Thanikul)	3 April 1981	def. Phisek Thanakorn on 5 June 1984; def. Chokdee Kiatpayathai on 5 July 1985
(Thailand) Kongnapa Singh T.C. (def. Yingyai Petchvichan)	23 August 1985	
(Thailand) Samransak Muangsurin (def. Saengsakda Kittikasem)	13 June 1986	
(Thailand) Saencherng Pinsinchai (def. Samransak Muangsurin)	19 December 1986	
Saencherng vacated the title in 1987.
(Thailand) Panomtuanlek Hapalang (def. Petchdam Lukborai)	27 October 1987	def. Manasak Sor.Ploenchit on 27 November 1987; def. Namphon Nongkeepahuyuth on 3 May 1988
(Thailand) Wangchannoi Sor.Palangchai (def. Panomtuanlek Hapalang)	25 November 1988	def. Kaonar Sor.Kettalingchan on 25 July 1989
Wangchannoi was stripped of the title on 6 October 1989, after the referee stopped the action in the last round of a title defense against Superlek Sorn E-Sarn for suspicion of a fixed fight .
(Thailand) Therdkiat Sitthepitak (def. Superlek Sorn E-Sarn)	7 November 1989	def. Panomrunglek Chor.Sawat on 30 March 1990
Therdkiat vacated the title in 1990.
(Thailand) Superlek Sorn E-Sarn (def. Wangchannoi Sor.Palangchai)	7 August 1990	
(Thailand) Wangchannoi Sor.Palangchai (2) (def. Superlek Sorn E-Sarn)	14 June 1991	
(Thailand) Boonlai Sor.Thanikul (def. Wangchannoi Sor.Palangchai)	31 January 1992	def. Oley Kiatoneway on 13 October 1992
(Thailand) Chatchai Paiseetong (def. Boonlai Sor.Thanikul)	August 1993	
(Thailand) Wangchannoi Sor.Palangchai (3) (def. Chatchai Paiseetong)	22 October 1993	
(Thailand) Chatchai Paiseetong (2) (def. Wangchannoi Sor.Palangchai)	30 November 1993	
(Thailand) Karuhat Sor.Supawan (def. Chatchai Paiseetong)	17 December 1993	def. Boonlai Sor.Thanikul on 13 February 1994; def. Chatchai Paiseetong on 8 March 1994
(Thailand) Wangchannoi Sor.Palangchai (4) (def. Karuhat Sor.Supawan)	29 April 1994	
(Thailand) Hansuk Prasathinpanomrung (def. Wangchannoi Sor.Palangchai)	29 July 1994	
(Thailand) Meechok Sor.Ploenchit (def. Hansuk Prasathinpanomrung)	28 October 1994	
(Thailand) Karuhat Sor.Supawan (2) (def. Meechok Sor.Ploenchit)	24 March 1995	
Karuhat vacated the title in 1995.
(Thailand) Samkor Chor.Rathchatasupak (def. Choengnoen Sitphutthapim)	23 May 1995	
Samkor vacated the title in 1996.
(Thailand) Ritthichai Lukjaopordam (def. Nungubon Sitlerchai)	11 October 1996	def. Baipet Lukjaomaesaiwaree on 17 December 1996; def. Kaolan Kaovichit on 23 May 1997
(Thailand) Attachai Por.Yosanan (def. Ritthichai Lukjaopordam)	19 September 1997	def. Khochasarn Singklonsi on 28 November 1997
Attachai vacated the title in 1999.
(Thailand) Pornpitak Phetudomchai (def. Itsarasak Jor.Ratchadakorn)	23 April 1999	
(Thailand) Denthoranee Nakornthongparkview (def. Pornpitak Phetudomchai)	4 June 1999	
(Thailand) Khunpinit Kiattawan (def. Denthoranee Nakornthongparkview)	13 July 1999	def. Pornpitak Phetudomchai on 5 November 1999; def. Kairat Porpaoin on 19 August 2000
Thailand Pinsinchai (def. Fahsuchon Sit-O)	26 April 2002	
Thailand vacated the title in 2003.
(Thailand) Yodbuangam Lukbanyai (def. Chatree Sitpafa)	22 April 2003	
Yodbuangam vacated the title in 2004.
(Thailand) Duangsompong Por.Khumpai (def. Trijak Sitjomtri)	16 April 2004	
(Thailand) Yuttakarn Tungsongtaksin (def. Duangsompong Por.Khumpai)	7 January 2005	
Yuttakarn vacated the title in 2005.
(Thailand) Denkiri 13rianresort (def. Trijak Sitjomtri)	16 August 2005	
(Thailand) Nong-O Sit Or (def. Denkiri 13rianresort)	25 April 2006	
(Thailand) Pokaew Fonjangchonburi (def. Nong-O Sit Or)	19 October 2006	
(Thailand) Pinsiam Sor.Amnuaysirichoke (def. Pokaew Fonjangchonburi)	2 March 2007	
(Thailand) Pansak Luk.Bor.Kor (def. Pinsiam Sor.Amnuaysirichoke)	7 September 2007	
(Thailand) Detnarong Sitjaboon (def. Pansak Luk.Bor.Kor)	7 December 2007	def. Captainken Narupai on 5 February 2008; draws with Wuttidet Lukprabat on 28 March 2008
(Thailand) Sam-A Tor.Rattanakiat (def. Detnarong Sitjaboon)	31 October 2008	def. Pornsanae Sitmonchai on 6 February 2009; def. Lekkla Thanasuranakorn on 8 December 2009; def. Tong Puideenaidee on 7 December 2010; def. Tong Puideenaidee on 10 June 2011
Sam-A vacated the title in 2012.
(Thailand) Tong Puideenaidee (def. Petpanomrung Kiatmuu9)	3 April 2012	
Tong vacated the title in 2012.
(Thailand) Tingthong Chor KoiYuha-Isuzu (def. Nongbeer Choknamwrong)	7 December 2012	
Tingthong vacated the title in 2013.
(Thailand) Rungphet Kaiyanghadao (def. Rungphet Wor Rungniran)	6 September 2013	
Rungphet vacated the title in 2013.
(Thailand) Detsakda Sitsongpeenong (def. Kunitaka)	9 March 2014	
Detsakda vacated the title in 2014.
(Thailand) Nattaphon Nacheukvittayakom (def. Itto Nakatake)	11 May 2014	def. Arashi Fujihara on 12 October 2014; def. Itto Nakatake on 28 December 2014; def. Sota Ichinohe on 4 April 2015; def. Itto Nakatake on 19 July 2015; def. Itto Nakatake on 27 December 2015
Nattaphon vacated the title in 2016.
(Thailand) Teto Hoywanpochana (def. Pakayphet Eminentair)	8 August 2017	
Teto vacated the title in 2017.
(Thailand) Worawut Boveejean (def. Ronachai Santi-Ubon)	6 March 2018	
(Thailand) Kongsuk Sitsarawatsuer (def. Worawut Boveejean)	19 March 2019	
Kongsuk vacated the title in 2019.
(Thailand) Prajanchai P.K.Saenchaimuaythaigym (def. Petchsamarn Sor.Samarngarment)	11 February 2020	

=== Featherweight Championship ===
Weight limit: 126 lb (57.2 kg)

Name	Date	Defenses
(Thailand) Sakda Yontharakit (def. Issarasak Panthainorasing)		
Inaugural Champion.
(Thailand) Isarasak Barbos (def. Sakda Yontharakit)	1950s	
(Thailand) Adul Srisothon (def. Isarasak Panthainorasing (Barbos))	1958	
(Thailand) Wicharn Sor.Pinjisak (def. )	1960s	
(Thailand) Danchai Ploenjit (def. )	1960s	
(Thailand) Rerngsak Sor.Lukpitak (def. Wicharn Sor.Pinjisak)		
(Thailand) Weeranit Charoenmuang (def. )		
(Thailand) Saentanong Kessongkhram (def. )	1964	def. Ruengsak Sor.Lukpitak on 8 September 1964
(Thailand) Anantakorn Sor.Lukmuangraj (Anantadej Sithiran) (def. Pranom Sor.Sittha)	1968	
(Thailand) Sirimongkol Luksiripat (def. Anantadej Sithiran)	1970	
Sirimongkol vacated the title in 1972.
(Thailand) Bundit Singprakarn (def. Denthoranee Muangsurin)	8 December 1972	def. Kiattinin Lookphisit on 17 August 1973
Bundit was stripped of the title when he was dismissed by the referee during a fight against Sagat Petchyindee on 3 May 1977.
(Thailand) Kaopong Sitichuchai (def. Ruengsak Porntawee)	11 August 1978	
Kaopong vacated the title in 1980.
(Thailand) Samart Payakaroon (def. Samingnoom Sithiboontham)	13 October 1981	def. Samransak Muangsurin on 5 April 1983
Samart vacated the title in 1983.
(Thailand) Sornsilp Sitnoenpayom (def. )	1983-1984	
(Thailand) Singdaeng Kiatthaksin (def. Sornsilp Sitnoenpayom)	30 March 1984	def. Sornsilp Sitnoenpayom on 12 February 1985
(Thailand) Yoknoi Fairtex (def. Sornsilp Sitnoenpayom)	22 June 1985	draws with Bandon Sitbangprachan on 9 September 1985
(Thailand) Bandon Sitbangprachan (def. Yoknoi Fairtex)	11 October 1985	
(Thailand) Palannoi Kiatanan (def. Bandon Sitbangprachan)	29 July 1986	
(Thailand) Yoknoi Fairtex (2) (def. Palannoi Kiatanan)	25 November 1986	def. Sanit Wichitkriengkrai on 19 December 1986
(Thailand) Chanchai Sor.Tamarangsri (def. Yoknoi Fairtex)	31 July 1987	def. Jomwo Chernyim on 29 December 1987; def. Saencherng Pinsinchai on 26 January 1988
(Thailand) Samransak Muangsurin (def. Chanchai Sor.Tamarangsri)	29 April 1988	
(Thailand) Jaroenthong Kiatbanchong (def. Samransak Muangsurin)	25 November 1988	
(Thailand) Namphon Nongkeepahuyuth (def. Jaroenthong Kiatbanchong)	10 March 1989	def. Sanphet Lokrangsee on 30 May 1989; def. Jaroenthong Kiatbanchong on 6 October 1989
(Thailand) Petchdam Sor.Bodin (def. Namphon Nongkeepahuyuth)	30 March 1990	
(Thailand) Therdkiat Sitthepitak (def. Petchdam Sor.Bodin)	30 June 1990	
(Thailand) Jaroenthong Kiatbanchong (def. Therdkiat Sitthepitak)	14 June 1991	
Jaroenthong vacated the title in 1991.
(Thailand) Therdkiat Sitthepitak (2) (def. Sanit Wichitkriengkrai)	27 September 1991	
(Thailand) Jongsanan Fairtex (def. Therdkiat Sitthepitak)	21 February 1992	def. Therdkiat Sitthepitak on 27 September 1992; def. Superlek Sorn E-Sarn on 6 April 1993
Jongsanan vacated the title in 1993.
(Thailand) Therdkiat Sitthepitak (3) (def. Oley Kiatoneway)	5 October 1993	
(Thailand) Mathee Jadeepitak (def. Therdkiat Sitthepitak)	29 July 1994	def. Chatchai Paiseetong on 9 September 1994; def. Ritthichai Lookchaomaesaitong on 24 March 1995
(Thailand) Lamnamoon Sor.Sumalee (def. Mathee Jadeepitak)	21 May 1996	def. Chatchai Paiseetong on 23 August 1996
Lamnamoon vacated the title in 1997.
(Thailand) Singsarawat 13riantower (def. Pongsak Por.Ruamrudee )	19 December 1997	def. Khochasan Singklongsi on 29 September 1998
(Thailand) Thongthai Sitjompop (def. Singsarawat 13riantower)	8 December 1998	def. Chokdee Por.Pramuk on 6 February 1999; def. Singsarawat 13riantower on 22 May 1999
(Thailand) Mitthai Sor.Sakulphan (def. Thongthai Sitjompop)	21 August 1999	
(Thailand) Isorasak Jor.Rajadakorn (def. Mitthai Sor.Sakulphan)	11 March 2000	def. Mitthai Sor.Sakulphan on 11 November 2000
Mitthai was stripped of the title in 2001.
(Thailand) Charlie Sor.Chaitamil (def. Buakaw Por.Pramuk)	7 December 2001	
Charlie vacated the title in 2003.
(Thailand) Pornpitak Petchudomchai (def. Methee Kor.Champfarm)	19 September 2003	
(Thailand) Kongpipop Petchyindee (def. Pornpitak Petchudomchai)	12 November 2004	
(Thailand) Nopparat Keatkhamtorn (def. Kongpipop Petchyindee)	7 December 2004	
(Thailand) Anuwat Kaewsamrit (def. Nopparat Keatkhamtorn)	6 May 2005	
Anuwat vacated the title in 2005.
(Thailand) Duangsompong Por.Khumpai (def. Yodwanlop Por.Nuttachai)	12 August 2005	
Duangsompong vacated the title in 2006.
(Thailand) Kaew Fairtex (def. Traijak Sitjomtrai)	6 June 2006	def. Sarawut Lukbanyai on 8 December 2006
(Thailand) Santipap SitUbon (def. Kaew Fairtex)	2 March 2007	
Santipap vacated the title in 2007.
(Thailand) Sagetdao Petpayathai (def. Chalermdet Sor.Tawanrung)	7 September 2007	
(Thailand) Nong-O Sit Or (def. Sagetdao Petpayathai)	7 December 2007	
(Thailand) Chalermdet Sor.Tawanrung (def. Nong-O Sit Or)	5 February 2007	draws with Lo-ngern Pitakkruchaidaen on 28 March 2008
(Thailand) Pansak Look Bor Kor (def. Chalermdet Sor.Tawanrung)	4 July 2008	
(Thailand) Petchboonchu FA Group (def. Parnsak LukkBorKor)	8 December 2009	def. Jomthong Chuwattana on 6 March 2009
Petchboonchu vacated the title in 2009.
(Thailand) Pornsanae Sitmonchai (def. Trijak Sitjomtrai)	8 December 2009	
(Thailand) Singtongnoi Por.Telakun (def. Pornsanae Sitmonchai)	5 October 2010	
Singtongnoi vacated the title in 2010.
(Thailand) Kongsak Sitboonmee (def. Pornsanae Sitmonchai)	7 December 2010	
Kongsak vacated the title in 2011.
(Thailand) Penek Sitnumnoi (def. Mongkolchai Kwaitonggym)	6 September 2011	def. Wanchalerm Chor.Cheankamon on 9 March 2012; def. Sam-A Gaiyanghadao on 4 May 2012; def. Petpanomrung Kiatmuu9 on 7 December 2012
(Thailand) Superbank Mor Ratanabandit (def. Penek Sitnumnoi)	9 July 2013	def. Thanonchai Thanakorngym on 8 October 2013; def. Sam-A Gaiyanghadao on 3 December 2013; def. Superlek Kiatmuu9 on 6 May 2014; def. Thaksinlek Kiatniwat on 9 December 2014
Superbank vacated the title in 2015.
(Thailand) Panpayak Jitmuangnon (def. Sam-A Kaiyanghadaogym)	6 March 2015	
(Thailand) Saen Parunchai (def. Panpayak Jitmuangnon)	5 June 2015	
Saen vacated the title in 2015.
(Thailand) Panpayak Jitmuangnon (2) (def. Kaonar P.K.SaenchaiMuaythaiGym)	22 December 2015	
Panpayak vacated the title in 2017.
(Thailand) Chalam Parunchai (def. Messi Pangkongprab)	7 November 2017	def. Siwakorn Kiatjaroenchai on 11 December 2018
Chalam was stripped of the title due to a knockout loss in a non-title bout against Kiewpayak Jitmuangnon on 26 June 2019.
(Thailand) Chalam Parunchai (2) (def. View Petchkoson)	6 March 2020	
Chalam vacated the title in 2021.

=== Super Featherweight Championship ===
Weight limit: 130 lb (59.0 kg)

Name	Date	Defenses
(Thailand) Mongkoldet Pitakchai (def. Mekhmekhin Yontharakit)	1966–1967	
Inaugural Champion
(Thailand) Weerachai Hor.Mahachai (def. Mongkoldet Pitakchai)	21 March 1969	
(Thailand) Srichang Sakornpitak (def. Weerachai Hor.Mahachai)	1970	
The title was vacant as of 1972.
(Thailand) Burengnong Sakornpitak (def. Pranom Sor.Sittha)	1972	
Burengnong was stripped of the title when he was dismissed by the referee in the last round during a title defense against Pudpadnoi Worawut on 11 May 1973.
(Thailand) Pudpadnoi Worawut (def. Chaiyut Sitiboonlert)	22 June 1973	
(Thailand) Khunponnoi Kiatsuriya (def. Pudpadnoi Worawut)	26 July 1974	
(Thailand) Wichit Lukbangplasoi (def. Khunponnoi Kiatsuriya)	15 October 1974	
Wichit was stripped following a suspicion of match fixing during a title defense against Posai Sitiboonlert on 14 May 1976.
(Thailand) Kraiphet Sor.Prateep (def. Permsiri Rungrit)	12 April 1978	
(Thailand) Wangphrai Rojsongkram (def. Kraiphet Sor.Prateep)	1978	
Wangphrai was stripped of the title when he was dismissed by the referee in the last round of a fight against Khunponnoi Haphalang.
(Thailand) Kamlaiyok Kaitsompop (def. Fakaew Fairtex)	27 April 1979	
Kamlaiyok was stripped of the title on 14 December 1979 when he was dismissed by the referee in the last round of a title defense against Khaosod Sitpraprom.
(Thailand) Ruengsak Porntawee (def. Pornsak Sitchang)	23 January 1981	def. Krongsak Sakkasem on 3 November 1981
(Thailand) Wanpadet Sitkhrumai (def. Daoden Sakornpitak)	22 January 1985	
Wanpadet was stripped of the title after losing to Lucien Carbin in a non-title fight in Amsterdam on 27 January 1985.
(Thailand) Daoden Sakornpitak (def. Ratchabut Sor.Thanikul)	7 May 1985	
The title was vacant as of January 1987.
(Thailand) Kongdej Chor.Wiraj (def. Paksa Kiatsayan)	8 December 1987	
Kondej vacated the title in 1988.
(Thailand) Prasert Kittikasem (def. Chanchai Sor.Tamarangsri)	26 July 1988	
(Thailand) Saencherng Pinsinchai (def. Prasert Kittikasem)	10 March 1989	
(Thailand) Cherry Sor.Wanich (def. Saencherng Pinsinchai)	25 July 1989	def. Saencherng Pinsinchai on 6 October 1989; drew with Namphon Nongkeepahuyuth on 6 January 1990; def. Superlek Sorn E-Sarn on 30 March 1990; def. Therdkiat Sitthepitak on 30 October 1990
(Thailand) Namkabuan Nongkeepahuyuth (def. Cherry Sor.Wanich)	31 May 1991	def. Nuathoranee Thongracha on 6 August 1991; def. Sakmongkol Sithchuchok on 21 February 1992; def. Therdkiat Sitthepitak on 9 June 1992; def. Nuathoranee Thongracha on 27 September 1992; def. Pairot Wor.Wolapon on 5 October 1993; def. Prabpramlek Sitnarong on 5 March 1996; def. Samkor Chor.Ratchatasupak on 12 November 1996; def. Keng Singnakhonkui on 27 April 1997
Namkabuan was stripped of the title in 1997.
(Thailand) Lamnamoon Sor.Sumalee (def. Samkor Chor.Ratchatasupak)	19 December 1997	def. Rambojiew Por.Thubtim on 29 September 1998
(Thailand) Khunsuk Sitporamet (def. Lamnamoon Sor.Sumalee )	29 March 1999	def. Attachai Fairtex on 11 May 1999
Khunsuk vacated the title in 1999.
(Thailand) Lamnamoon Sor.Sumalee (2) (def. Samkor Chor.Ratchatasupak)	25 September 1999	
(Thailand) Namsaknoi Yudthagarngamtorn (def. Lamnamoon Sor.Sumalee)	7 December 1999	
Namsaknoi was stripped of the title after missing weight for a title defense against Attachai Por.Samranchai on 2 February 2000.
(Thailand) Samkor Chor.Ratchatasupak (def. Rambojiew Por.Thubtim)	22 April 2000	def. Attachai Por.Samranchai on 2 December 2000; def. Nontachai Kiatwanlop on 22 March 2002
Samkor vacated the title in 2003.
(Thailand) Sibmean Laemtongkarnpet (def. Samranchai 96Peenang)	2 November 2004	
(Thailand) Singdam Kiatmuu9 (def. Sibmean Laemtongkarnpet)	7 December 2004	
(Thailand) Sagatpetch Sor.Sakulpan (def. Singdam Kiatmuu9)	18 March 2005	
Sagatpetch vacated the title in April 2005.
(Thailand) Singdam Kiatmuu9 (2) (def. Orono Wor Petchpun)	6 May 2005	
(Thailand) Saenchai SinbiMuaythai (def. Singdam Kiatmuu9)	9 December 2005	drew with Nopparat Keatkhamtorn on 17 January 2006
(Thailand) Nopparat Keatkhamtorn (def. Saenchai SinbiMuaythai)	2 June 2006	def. Singdam Kiatmuu9 on 14 July 2006
Nopparat vacated the title in 2006.
(Thailand) Saenchai SinbiMuaythai (2) (def. Duangsompong Kor.Sapaothong)	22 September 2006	
(Thailand) Orono Wor Petchpun (def. Saenchai Sor.Kingstar)	7 December 2007	
(Thailand) Saenchai Sor.Kingstar (3) (def. Orono Wor Petchpun)	2 May 2008	
(Thailand) Petchboonchu FA Group (def. Saenchai Sor.Kingstar)	7 August 2009	
(Thailand) Nong-O Kaiyanghadaogym (def. Petchboonchu FA Group)	8 December 2009	def. Petchboonchu FA Group on 12 March 2010; def. Singdam Kiatmuu9 on 13 July 2010; def. Pakorn Sakyothin on 5 October 2010
(Thailand) Kongsak Sitboonmee (def. Nong-O Kaiyanghadaogym)	10 June 2011	
(Thailand) F-16 Rachanon (def. Kongsak Sitboonmee)	6 September 2011	
F-16 vacated the title in 2012.
(Thailand) Yodwicha Por Boonsit (def. Kongsak Sitboonmee)	9 November 2012	
Yodwicha vacated the title in 2013.
(Thailand) Kongsak Sitboonmee (def. Petpanomrung Kiatmuu9)	7 June 2013	
Kongsak vacated the title in 2013.
(Thailand) Petchmorakot Wor.Sangprapai (def. Auisiewpor Sujibamikiew)	3 December 2013	def. Kwankhao Mor.Ratanabandit on 28 February 2014; def. Genji Umeno on 19 April 2015
Petchmorakot vacated the title in 2015.
(Thailand) Kaewkangwan Priewwayo (def. Superlek Kiatmuu9)	8 December 2015	
Kaewkangwan vacated the title in 2016.
(Thailand) Nuenglanlek Jitmuangnon (def. Jamesak Sakburiram)	8 August 2016	
(Thailand) Phetmorakot Teeded99 (def. Nuenglanlek Jitmuangnon)	9 December 2016	
Phetmorakot vacated the title in 2017.
(Thailand) Mongkoldetlek KesaGym (def. Suakim PK Saenchaimuaythaigym)	9 June 2017	
(Thailand) Nawapon Lookpachrist (def. Mongkoldetlek KesaGym)	14 November 2017	
Nawapon vacated the title in 2018.
(Thailand) Suakim PK Saenchaimuaythaigym (def. Theppabut Phetkiatphet)	7 September 2018	
Suakim vacated the title in 2019.
(Thailand) Songkom Bangkokalaiyon (def. Krobsut Fairtex)	6 June 2019	
The title was retired in 2021-2022 due to the COVID-19 pandemic.
(Thailand) Khunpon Eakmuangnon (def.Petchphadaen Jitmuangnon)	12 December 2023	

=== Lightweight Championship ===
Weight limit: 135 lb (61.2 kg)

Name	Date	Defenses
(Thailand) Sompong Samanchan (def. Channarong Luksurin)	1950s	
Inaugural champion.
(Thailand) Adul Srisothon (def. Danchai Yontharakit)	12 December 1960	
Adul vacated the title in 1962.
(Thailand) Wicharn Sor.Pinjisak (def. Prakaikaew Luk Sor.Kor.)	28 May 1963	
Wicharn vacated the title in 1963.
(Thailand) Saenthanong Ketsongkram (def. Khonongmek Kachaphichit)	2 July 1966	def. Yoddoi Singnakornping on 30 December 1966
(Thailand) Khonongmek Kachaphichit (def. Saentanong Ketsangkam)	13 June 1967	
(Thailand) Saennapa Payaksophon (def. Khonongmek Kachaphichit)	1968	
The title was vacant as of 1 April 1974 .
(Thailand) Sirimongkol Luksiripat (def. Phayakphoom Phayakkhao)	19 April 1974	def. Wankaew Sityodtong on 13 June 1976; def. Monsawan Lukchiangmai on 2 November 1976
Sirimongkol vacated the title in 1977.
(Thailand) Siangnow Sitbangprachan (def. Siprae Kiatsompop)	6 May 1977	
(Thailand) Siprae Kiatsompop (def. Siangnow Sitbangprachan)	6 September 1977	
The title was vacant as of 1 January 1981.
(Thailand) Dieselnoi Chor Thanasukarn (def. Kaopong Sitchuchai)	9 January 1981	
Dieselnoi vacated the title in 1984.
(Thailand) Kitti Sor.Thanikul (def. Jomtrai Petchyindee)	14 August 1984	
(Thailand) Sagat Petchyindee (def. )	1985	def. Sawainoi Daopadriew on 22 October 1985
The title became vacant as Sagat couldn't find an opponent in time.
(Thailand) Sagat Petchyindee (2) (def. Komtae Chor.Suananant)	17 June 1988	
The title was vacant as of 1 August 1990.
(Thailand) Issara Sakkreerin (def. Thantawanoi Tor.Silachai)	18 August 1990	def. Ramon Dekkers on 27 November 1990
Issara vacated the title in 1991.
(Thailand) Coban Lookchaomaesaitong (def. Bandon Sitbangprachan)	1991	
(Thailand) Nongmoon Chomphutong (def. Coban Lookchaomaesaitong)	28 March 1992	
Nongmoon vacated the title in 1992.
(Thailand) Panomrunglek Chor.Sawat (def. Sangtiennoi Sor.Rungroj)	13 October 1992	
(Thailand) Petchdam Lukborai (def. Panomrunglek Chor.Sawat)	6 April 1993	def. Orono Por.MuangUbon on 30 October 1993
(Thailand) Panomrunglek Chor.Sawat (2) (def. Petchdam Lukborai)	27 November 1993	
(Thailand) Sakmongkol Sithchuchok (def. Panomrunglek Chor.Sawat)	8 January 1994	
(Thailand) Chandet Sor.Prantalay (def. Sakmongkol Sithchuchok)	13 February 1994	def. Sangtiennoi Sor.Rungroj on 25 March 1994
(Thailand) Jongsanan Fairtex (def. Chandet Sor.Prantalay)	July 1994	
(Thailand) Pairot Wor.Wolapon (def. Jongsanan Fairtex)	19 November 1994	
(Thailand) Orono Por.MuangUbon (def. Pairot Wor.Wolapon)	24 December 1994	def. Jongsanan Fairtex on 28 March 1995; draws with Sangtiennoi Sor.Rungroj on 11 October 1996
Orono vacated the title in 1997.
(Thailand) Sangtiennoi Sor.Rungroj (def. Keng Singnakonkui)	27 September 1997	def. Prabpramlek Sitnarong on 14 February 1998
(Thailand) Samkor Chor.Rathchatasupak (def. Sangtiennoi Sor.Rungroj)	29 September 1998	
(Thailand) Kaolan Kaovichit (def. Samkor Chor.Rathchatasupak)	26 March 1999	
(Thailand) Khunsuk Phetsupaphan (def. Kaolan Kaovichit)	10 August 1999	
The title was vacant as of 1 April 2000.
(Thailand) Namsaknoi Yudthagarngamtorn (def. Kaolan Kaovichit)	25 April 2000	def. Samkor Chor.Rathchatasupak on 26 April 2002; def. Noppadet Sengsiewmaigym on 18 November 2003; def. Nontachai Sit-O on 3 September 2004; def. Samranchai 96Peenang on 5 July 2005; def. Nontachai Sit-O on 21 October 2005
Namsaknoi vacated the title in 2006.
(Thailand) Sagatpetch IngramGym (def. Samranchai 96Peenang)	6 June 2006	
Sagatpetch vacated the title in 2008.
(Thailand) Duangsompong Kor.Sapaothong (def. Tuantong Pumpanmuang)	16 September 2008	
(Thailand) Kaew Fairtex (def. Duangsompong Kor.Sapaothong)	21 March 2009	
Kaew vacated the title in 2009.
(Thailand) Sagetdao Petpayathai (def. Saenchai Sor.Kingstar)	8 December 2009	
(Thailand) Petchboonchu FA Group (def. Sagetdao Petpayathai)	4 June 2010	
(Thailand) Saenchai SinbeeMuaythai (def. Petchboonchu FA Group)	5 October 2010	
Saenchai vacated the title in 2011.
(Thailand) Sagetdao Petpayathai (def. Petchboonchu FA Group)	8 March 2011	def. Saenchai SinbeeMuaythai on 10 June 2011
(Thailand) Petchboonchu FA Group (def. Sagetdao Petpayathai)	7 July 2011	
Petchboonchu vacated the title in 2013.
(Thailand) Singdam Kiatmoo9 (def. Nong-O Kaiyanghadaogym)	8 June 2012	def. Nong-O Sit Or on 31 July 2012; def. Saenchai P.K. Saenchai Muaythaigym on 7 September 2012
(Thailand) Nong-O Kaiyanghadaogym (def. Singdam Kiatmoo9)	7 June 2013	
(Thailand) Singdam Kiatmoo9 (def. Nong-O Kaiyanghadaogym)	12 July 2013	
(Thailand) Petchboonchu FA Group (def. Singdam Kiatmoo9)	11 October 2013	def. Pakorn Sakyothin on 7 January 2014; def. Saenchai P.K. Saenchai Muaythaigym on 7 February 2014
Petchboonchu vacated the title in 2014.
(Thailand) Pakorn Sakyothin (def. Singdam Kiatmoo9)	28 February 2014	def. Sagetdao Petpayathai on 5 September 2014; def. Parnpetch Kiatjaroenchai on 9 December 2014
Pakorn vacated the title in 2015.
(Thailand) Chujaroen Dabransarakarm (def. Yodpanomrung Jitmuangnon)	4 September 2015	
(Thailand) Sittisak Petpayathai (def. Chujaroen Dabransarakarm)	3 June 2016	
Sittisak vacated the title in 2017.
(Thailand) Yodlekpet Or. Pitisak (def. Rambo Pet.Por.Tor.Or)	9 June 2017	
Yodlekpet vacated the title in 2018.
(Thailand) Kulabdam Sor.Jor.Piek-U-Thai (def. Genji Umeno)	18 February 2018	
Kulabdam vacated the title in 2019.
(Thailand) Nuathoranee Samchaivisetsuk (def. Sakchainoi M.U.Den)	30 November 2019	
The title was retired in 2021-2022 due to the COVID-19 pandemic.
(Thailand) Kanongsuek Gor.Kampanat (def. Mathias Gallo Cassarino)	29 April 2023	

=== Super Lightweight Championship ===
Weight limit: 140 lb (63.5 kg)

Name	Date	Defenses
(Thailand) Prayuth Suparat (def. Thuanthamin Kiatyothin)	1971	
Inaugural champion.
(Thailand) Sorasak Sor.Lukbukkhalo (def. Prayuth Suparat)	1 June 1971	
(Thailand) Saensak Muangsurin (def. Sorasak Sor.Lukbukkhalo)	30 November 1971	
Saesank vacated the title in 1974.
(Thailand) Pichit Singchueklueng (def. Rungroj Sor.Lakkhana)	1975	def. Mehmoud Saiyasothon on 11 April 1975
Title was vacant as of 1975.
(Thailand) Rotnarong Sor.Lakkhana (def. )	1970s	
(Thailand) Mehmoud Lubothong (def. Rotnarong Sor.Lakkhana)	17 June 1977	def. Wangkaew Kiatsompop on 22 September 1978
(Thailand) Wangkaew Kiatsompop (def. )	1979	
(Thailand) Saensathan Saengrit (def. )	1985	
(Thailand) Talatkhaek Phetmueangtrat (def. Saensathan Saengrit)	27 April 1985	
Title was vacant as of 1 January 1987.
(Thailand) Changpuek Kiatsongrit (def. Raktae Muangsurin)	20 March 1987	
(Thailand) Mapralong Sit PTT (def. Mongkoldet Kiatanan)	14 November 1987	
Mapralong was stripped of the title when he was dismissed during a title defense against Phetdam Phukhrongfa on 18 July 1988.
(Thailand) Pothai Chor.Waikul (def. Phetdam Phukhrongfa)	1989	
(Thailand) Jomhod Kiatadisak (def. Pothai Chor.Waikul)	12 August 1989	def. Sittisak Saksanguan on 21 April 1990; def. Sittisak Tor.Anusorn on 31 May 1992
Jomhod vacated the title in 1993.
(Thailand) Saimai Chor.Suananan (def. Samart Kayadisorn)	14 September 1996	
Title was vacant as of 1 April 1999.
(France) Morad Sari (def. Somchai Sor.Nantana)	8 May 1999	
Morad was stripped of the title in 2000 after failing to defend it within the required period.
(Thailand) Huasai Oldwestgym (def. )	2003	
(Thailand) Chokdee Por.Pramuk (def. Noppadet Saengsimaewgym)	17 February 2004	def. Naruepol Sakhomsin on 10 December 2004
(Thailand) Phetnaimek Sor.Siriwat (def. Chokdee Por.Pramuk)	22 November 2005	def. Khunsuk Phetsupaphan on 22 July 2006
Phetnaimek vacated the title in 2007.
(Thailand) Kongfah Uddonmuang (def. Noppadet Saengsimaewgym)	11 November 2008	def. Kamel Jemel on 26 February 2010
(France) Damien Alamos (def. Kongfah Uddonmuang)	10 February 2012	def. Aranchai Tor.Pran26 on 7 September 2012; def. Singsuriya Mor Ratanabandit on 16 July 2013
Alamos was stripped of the title in 2013.
(Thailand) Chamuaktong Fightermuaythai (def. Nong-O Kaiyanghadaogym)	3 December 2013	
(Thailand) Saensatharn Sor.Suradej (def. Chamuaktong Sor.Yupinda)	10 June 2014	
(Thailand) Singdam Kiatmuu9 (def. Saensatharn Sor.Suradej)	5 September 2014	
(Thailand) Chamuaktong Sor.Yupinda (2) (def. Singdam Kiatmuu9)	8 December 2015	def. Petpanomrung Kiatmuu9 on 10 June 2016; def. Chujaroen Dabransarakarm on 9 December 2016
Chamuaktong vacated the title in 2017.
Rittewada Sitthikul and Nontakit Tor.Morsi fought to a draw for the vacant title on 5 September 2017.
(Thailand) Rittewada Sitthikul (def. Nontakit Tor.Morsi)	7 November 2017	
Rittewada vacated the title in 2018.
(Thailand) Kulabdam Sor.Jor.Piek-U-Thai (def. Ferrari Jakrayanmuaythai)	19 March 2019	
Kulabdam vacated the title in 2019. The title was retired in 2021-2022 due to the COVID-19 pandemic and is vacant as of 2024

=== Welterweight Championship ===
Weight limit: 147 lb (66.7 kg)

Name	Date	Defenses
(Thailand) Srisawat Thiamprasit (def. Tawanchai Kaewsuriya)	1956	
Inaugural champion.
(Thailand) Parnsak Wittichai (def. Srisawat Thiamprasit)	1957	
(Thailand) Kiewwan Yontharakit (def. Srisawat Thiamprasit)	1959	
The title was vacant as of 1962.
(Thailand) Phothong Dechachai (def. Iser Sorndaeng)	6 November 1962	
(Thailand) Chalamsak Klongphojon (def. Phothong Dechachai)	1963	
Chalamsak was removed as champion due to the Lumpinee Stadium committee's suspicion that Phothong threw the fight.
(Thailand) Apidej Sit-Hirun (def. Dejrit Itthianuchit)	4 August 1964	
Apidej was stripped of the title after losing by knockout in non-title bout against Danchai Ploenchit on 18 October 1966.
(Thailand) Apidej Sit-Hirun (2) (def. Payap Sakulsuk)	1967	
(Thailand) Dejrit Itthianuchit (def. Apidej Sit-Hirun)	27 September 1967	
Dejrit vacated the title.
(Thailand) Sukkasem Saifahlap (def. Payap Sakulsuk)	8 December 1967	
(Thailand) Prabsuk Sakulthai (def. Sukkasem Saifahlap)	1968	
Title was vacant as of 1 June 1975.
(Thailand) Pichit Singchuepleng (def. Mehmoud Lukbothong)	31 August 1975	
(Thailand) Buriram Suanmisakawan (def. Singsuk Petchkasem)	4 December 1978	
Title was vacant as of January 1981.
(Thailand) Samaisak Lukwichian (def. Phukradueng Sor.Phunphon)	24 January 1981	
Title was vacant as of January 1991.
(Thailand) Seuadao Por.Pisitchet (def. Sayidkhan Kiatpathan)	26 January 1991	
(Thailand) Wichan Chor.Rojchai (def. Seuadao Por.Pisitchet)	17 May 1993	
Title was vacant as of February 1997.
(Thailand) Kriangkrai Sor.Worapin (def. Sakmongkol Sithchuchok)	11 November 1997	
Kriangkrai was stripped of the title following a knockout loss to Nuengtrakarn Por.MuangUbon in a non-title fight in 1999.
On 8 May 1999, Nuengtrakarn Por.MuangUbon and Stéphane Nikiéma fought for the vacant belt with the bout ending in a no contest.
(Thailand) Detpitak I.S.S (def. Saimai Chor.Suananan)	19 June 1999	def. Nathi Sor.Khamsing on 9 October 1999
Detpitak vacated the title in 2001.
(Thailand) Pajonsuk Lukprabat (def. Kaolan Kaovichit)	20 July 2002	
(Thailand) Kaolan Kaovichit (def. Pajonsuk Lukprabat)	8 March 2003	
Kaolan vacated the title in 2004.
(Thailand) Yodsanklai Fairtex (def. Runkaew Sor.Boonya)	16 August 2005	
Yodsanklai vacated the title in 2006.
(Thailand) Thanongdet Chengzimaiwgym (def. Kaodangyai Surapichfarm)	4 April 2008	
Thanongdet vacated the title in 2011.
(Thailand) Aikpracha Meenayothin (def. Prakysiang Kaiyanghadaogym)	11 February 2012	
Aikpracha vacated the title in 2013.
(Thailand) Thongchai Sitsongpeenong (def. Fahmongkol Sor.Jor.Danrayong)	7 June 2013	
Thongchai vacated the title in 2014.
(Thailand) Sitthichai Sitsongpeenong (def. Maruay Sitjepond)	28 October 2014	
Sitthichai vacated the title in 2015.
(Thailand) Mangkornpet Sor.Kiatwat (def. Manaowan Barcelonagym)	8 December 2015	
Mangkornpet vacated the title in 2016.
(Thailand) Pongsiri P.K.Saenchaimuaythaigym (def. Rafi Bohic)	2 September 2016	
(France) Rafi Bohic (def. Pongsiri P.K.Saenchaimuaythaigym)	17 June 2017	
Bohic was stripped of his title for losing by knockout in a non-title fight against Nontakrit Tor.Morsi on 18 July 2017.
(France) Rafi Bohic (2) (def. Simanoot Sor.Sarinya)	26 December 2017	def. Dylan Salvador on 27 February 2018; def. Petkanthas M-Uden on 28 August 2018; def. Thananchai Rachanon on 12 October 2018; def. Manachai YokkaoSaenchaiGym on 30 April 2019
The title was retired in 2021-2022 due to the COVID-19 pandemic. The title was vacant as of 2024

=== Super Welterweight Championship ===
Weight limit: 154 lb (69.9 kg)

Name	Date	Defenses
(Thailand) Saknarong Singchueaphloeng (def. Thahanna Sitphraphirun)		
Inaugural champion.
(Thailand) Hern Silathong (def. Dejthai Ithichai)	1972	def. Dechthai Ittichai in 1973
The title was later discontinued for decades due to the lack of competition at the weight.
(Thailand) Saiyok Pumpanmuang (def. Farid Villaume)	26 February 2010	def. Abdallah Mabel on 29 October 2010
Saiyok vacated the title in 2012.
(Thailand) Sirimongkol Sitanupap (def. Yodpayak Sitsongpeenong)	20 October 2015	
(Thailand) Yodpayak Sitsongpeenong (def. Sirimongkol Sitniwat)	16 February 2016	def. Fahsura Windysport on 23 December 2016
Yodpayak vacated the title in 2017.
(Thailand) Buakiew Sitsongpeenong (def. Fahsura Windysport)	1 September 2017	
Buakiew vacated the title in 2018.
(Thailand) Talaytong Sor.Thanaphet (def. Luis Cajaiba)	30 November 2018	
Talaytong vacated the title in 2019.
(Thailand) Capitan Petchyindee Academy (def. Detrit Sathian Gym)	1 June 2019	def. Yodkhunpon Sitmonchai on 3 January 2020
The title was retired in 2021-2022 due to the COVID-19 pandemic.
(Thailand) Kongthailand Kiatnavy (def. Luis Cajaiba)	6 May 2023	

=== Middleweight Championship ===
Weight limit: 160 lb (72.6 kg)

Name	Date	Defenses
(Thailand) Mekdam Lukchaofah (def. Suchai Ketsongkram)	1950s	def. Sema Klasuek
Inaugural champion. Mekdam vacated the title and retired due to lack of opposition
(Thailand) Bukdiew Yontharakit (def. Jeerasak Pongsing)	1962–1963	
(Thailand) Adisak Ithianuchit (def. Bukdiew Yontharakit)	1963	
(Thailand) Daoprakai Sor.Pinijsak (def. Sornchai Mullayut)	1964	
Daoprakai was stripped of the title when he was knocked out by Apidej Sit-Hirun in a non-title fight on 8 September 1964.
(Thailand) Dejthai Ratchadet (Ithichai) (def. Chakkrit Rithanuman)	1 13 June 967	
(Thailand) Narong Phitsanurachan (def. )	1967	
(Thailand) Narong Phitsanurachan (2) (def. )	1969	
(Thailand) Prapai Sitchumpon (def. )	1974	
The title was vacant as of 1 January 1978.
(Thailand) Satanfah Sor.Prateep (def. Genshuu Igari)	7 April 1978	
Satanfah vacated the title in 1979.
(Thailand) Noppakao SirilakMuaythai (def. Erhan Gungor)	19 August 2017	def. Takuya "T-98" Imamura on 2 December 2017.
Noppakaw vacated the title in 2018.
(Belgium) (Morocco) Youssef Boughanem (def. Talaytong Sor.Thanaphet)	22 May 2018	
Boughanem vacated the title in 2018.
(France) Jimmy Vienot (def. Talaytong Sor.Thanaphet)	30 April 2019	
(Thailand) Sorgraw Petchyindee Academy (def. Jimmy Vienot)	25 September 2019	
(Thailand) Denpanom Pran26 (def. Emerson Bento)	17 June 2023	

=== Super Middleweight Championship ===
Weight limit: 168 lb (76.2 kg)

Name	Date	Defenses
(Thailand) Kompikat Sor.Tawanrung (def. Vianney Sépéroumal)	17 December 2017	
First and only champion of the division.

== See also ==
- Rajadamnern Stadium
- World Muaythai Council
