= Samart Prasarnmit =

Thai former professional Muay Thai fighter

- Born: Samart Rakchartyingcheep; November 12, 1961 (age 64); Sikhio, Nakhon Ratchasima, Thailand
- Native name: สามารถ รักชาติยิ่งชีพ
- Nickname: Kick Master Who Subdues Points (จอมถีบสยบจุด)
- Height: 1.74 m (5 ft 9 in)
- Division: Super Lightweight
- Style: Muay Thai
- Stance: Orthodox

Samart Prasarnmit (Thai: สามารถ ประสานมิตร; born November 12, 1961) is a Thai former professional Muay Thai fighter. He is a former Rajadamnern Stadium Super Lightweight Champion who was famous during the 1980s.

== Biography and career ==
Samart started Muay Thai training at the Prasarnmit camp in the Nakhon Ratchasima province. He competed numerous times in the northeastern region of Thailand before reaching the Bangkok circuit in 1977.

Samart's breakout win happened in 1980 when he defeated renowned knee fighter Jocky Sitkanpai by knockout. During the peak of his career between 1982 and 1983 Samart defeated many notable fighters of his era such as Somsong Kiathoranee, Seksan Sor.Theppitak, Kaopong Sitchuchai, Padejsuk Pitsanurachan, Khaosod Sitpraprom, Ruengsak Porntawee or Paennoi Sakornpithak. He is purses reached over 100,000 baht during this period.

One of Samart's most notable victory was against American kickboxer Don Wilson who at the time was riding a 25 fights win streak while holding the WKA and K.I.C.K world titles. They faced each other on December 2, 1983, at the Lumpinee Stadium. Wilson weighed in at 172 lbs and Samart at 148 lbs. Samart won the fight by decision after he knocked Wilson down twice. Wilson claims he was asked to lose 8 pounds on the day of the bout by sitting in a sauna, leaving him dehydrated. Wilson had also negotiated for a 7-round fight, which the officials neglected to honor.

Samart was also the last opponent of Muay Thai legend Samart Payakaroon in the bangkok stadiums before leaving for international boxing. They met on December 28, 1983, at a catchweight of 133 lbs for an event at the Rajadamnern Stadium organized by famous promotor Klaew Thanikhul. Prasarnmit lost the fight by decision.

After 1983 Samart fell out of form, losing most of his fights until he retired in 1988. One of his losses came to the hands of Dutch champion Rob Kaman in Hong Kong on December 30, 1984. After retiring from fighting Samart went back to live in his native province where he is very involved in the life of his village.

== Titles and accomplishments ==
- Rajadamnern Stadium
  - 1982 Rajadamnern Stadium Super Lightweight (140 lbs) Champion

== Muay Thai record ==
Muay Thai Record
Date	Result	Opponent	Event	Location	Method	Round	Time
1989-04-11	Loss	(Thailand) Ayma Por.Singdam		Ubon Ratchathani, Thailand	KO	1	
?-	Loss	(Thailand) Changpuek Kiatsongrit		Thailand	Decision	5	3:00
1987-	Loss	(Thailand) Payap Premchai		Thailand	Decision	5	3:00
1987-	Loss	(Thailand) Payap Premchai		Thailand	Decision	5	3:00
1986-06-06	Win	(Thailand) Payap Premchai	Rangsit Stadium	Thailand	Decision	5	3:00
1986-	Loss	(Thailand) Krongsak Sakkasem		Bangkok, Thailand	KO		
1985-12-	Loss	(Thailand) Somsong Kiathoranee		Khon Kaen Thailand	KO		
1985-11-	Win	(Thailand) Payap Premchai		Thailand	Decision	5	3:00
1984-12-30	Loss	(Netherlands) Rob Kaman	WKA	Hong Kong	KO (Left hook to the body)	2	
1984-08-11	Loss	(Thailand) Sawainoi Daopaetriew		Ubon Ratchathani, Thailand	Decision	5	3:00
1984-05-03	NC	(Thailand) Sagat Petchyindee		Bangkok, Thailand	Ref. stop. (Samart dismissed)	2	
1984-	Win	(Thailand) Fanta Attapong		Bangkok, Thailand	KO (Knee to the body)	1	
1983-12-28	Loss	(Thailand) Samart Payakaroon	Rajadamnern Stadium	Bangkok, Thailand	Decision	5	3:00
1983-12-02	Win	(United States) Don Wilson	Royal Thai Army Welfare show, Lumpinee Stadium	Bangkok, Thailand	Decision	5	3:00
1983-08-31	Win	(Thailand) Ruengsak Porntawee	Rajadamnern Stadium	Bangkok, Thailand	Decision	5	3:00
1983-07-21	Win	(Thailand) Khaosod Sitpraprom	Rajadamnern Stadium	Bangkok, Thailand	KO (Knee to the body)	4	
1983-06-	Win	(France) François Kappler	Rajadamnern Stadium	Bangkok, Thailand	Decision	5	3:00
1983-05-17	Win	(Thailand) Paennoi Sakornphitak	Lumpinee Stadium	Bangkok, Thailand	Decision	5	3:00
1983-01-20	Win	(Thailand) Padejsuk Pitsanurachan	Rajadamnern Stadium	Bangkok, Thailand	Decision	5	3:00
1982-12-27	Win	(Thailand) Kaopong Sitchuchai	Rajadamnern Stadium	Bangkok, Thailand	Decision	5	3:00
1982-12-08	Win	(Thailand) Seksan Sor Theppitak	Rajadamnern Stadium	Bangkok, Thailand	Decision	5	3:00
1982-10-27	Draw	(Thailand) Inseenoi Sor.Thanikul	Rajadamnern Stadium	Bangkok, Thailand	Decision	5	3:00
1982-09-	Win	(Thailand) Saensatharn Saengrit	Rajadamnern Stadium	Bangkok, Thailand	Decision	5	3:00
1982-07-21	Loss	(Thailand) Krongsak Sakkasem	Rajadamnern Stadium	Bangkok, Thailand	Decision	5	3:00
1982-06-23	Win	(Thailand) Somsong Phachonpay	Rajadamnern Stadium	Bangkok, Thailand	Decision	5	3:00
Wins the Rajadamnern Stadium Super Lightweight (140 lbs) title.
1982-03-17	Loss	(Thailand) Jomtrai Petchyindee	Rajadamnern Stadium	Bangkok, Thailand	Decision	5	3:00
1982-02-24	Loss	(Thailand) Krongsak Sakkasem	Rajadamnern Stadium	Bangkok, Thailand	Decision	5	3:00
1981-12-27	Win	(Thailand) Kaopong Sitchuchai	Rajadamnern Stadium	Bangkok, Thailand	Decision	5	3:00
1981-12-16	Loss	(Thailand) Yussop Sor.Thanikul	Rajadamnern Stadium	Bangkok, Thailand	Decision	5	3:00
1981-10-21	Win	(Thailand) Nueasila Na Bankhot	Rajadamnern Stadium	Bangkok, Thailand	Decision	5	3:00
1981-03-31	Loss	(Thailand) Wangkaew Sityodtong		Chum Phae district, Thailand	TKO	2	
1980-12-15	Loss	(Thailand) Sakchai Singkrungthon	Mumnamgoen, Rajadamnern Stadium	Bangkok, Thailand	Decision	5	3:00
1980-	Win	(Thailand) Jocky Sitkanpai		Bangkok, Thailand	KO	4	
1979-02-08	Win	(Thailand) Danthong Chor.Chutirat	Rajadamnern Stadium	Bangkok, Thailand	KO	3	
1978-10-04	Loss	(Thailand) Kasemchai Weerapol	Rajadamnern Stadium	Bangkok, Thailand	Decision	5	3:00
1978-06-27	Loss	(Thailand) Sornrong Kiatkraisorn	Lumpinee Stadium	Bangkok, Thailand	Decision	5	3:00
1978-06-10	Win	(Thailand) Jaiphet Sakkromtang		Lampang province, Thailand	Decision	5	3:00
Legend: Win Loss Draw/No contest Notes
