= Roufus =

Roufus is a surname. Notable people with the surname include:

- Duke Roufus (1970–2025), American kickboxer
- Rick Roufus (born 1966), American kickboxer
