= Stéphane Nikiéma =

French kickboxer (born 1965)

- Born: Stéphane Nikiéma; April 6, 1965 (age 61); Rosny-sous-bois, France
- Nickname: Diesel Black
- Height: 187 cm (6 ft 2 in)
- Division: Welterweight
- Style: Muay Thai
- Stance: Orthodox
- Team: Belloni Gym; Derek Boxing
- Years active: c. 1982-2004

Kickboxing record
- Total: 98
- Wins: 79
- By knockout: 40
- Losses: 17
- Draws: 2

Stéphane Nikiéma (April 6, 1965)) is a French former Muay Thai fighter. He is a 3-times French Muay Thai champion, 3-times European Muay Thai champion, 3-times World Muay Thai champion, and challenged for a Lumpinee Stadium belt.

== Biography and fighting career ==
Nikiéma was born in Rosny-sous-bois to a half-Polish, half-French mother and a Burkinabe father. He began boxing when he was 17 and became one of the best farangs who have fought in Thailand.

His professional career ran from 1985 to 2004.

After his retirement he opened the Pattaya Muay Thai Academy in Thailand.

== Titles and accomplishments ==
- Lumpinee Stadium title challenger
- WPKN European Champion
- 3-times World Muaythai Champion
- 3-times European Muaythai Champion
- 3-times French Muaythai Champion

== Fight record ==
Professional Kickboxing record
79 Wins (40 (T)KO's), 17 Losses, 2 Draw
Date	Result	Opponent	Event	Location	Method	Round	Time
2004-06-05	Loss	(France) Morad Sari	Le Grand Tournoi	Paris, France	Decision		
2000-01-29	Loss	(Thailand) Orono Por Muang Ubon	NJKF Millenium Wars 1	Tokyo, Japan	Decision (Split)	5	3:00
For the IWM Jr Welterweight title.
1999-12-05	Loss	(Thailand) Dejpitak Sityodtong	Kings Birthday	Bangkok, Thailand	Decision	5	3:00
For the WMTC World Super Welterweight (154 lbs) title.
1999-05-08	NC	(Thailand) Neungtrakarn Por Muang Ubon	Lumpinee Stadium	Bangkok, Thailand	No contest	3	
For the vacant Lumpinee Stadium Welterweight (147 lbs) title. In the third round Nuengtrakarn is overwhelmed at the edge of the KO and the referee intervenes. Nuengtrakarn isn't counted and the fight is declared a no contest causing an important controversy.
1999-02-27	Loss	(Netherlands) Perry Ubeda	Muaythai Gala in Palais des Sports	Marseilles, France	TKO (Referee Stoppage)	4	
1998-12-05	Win	(Thailand) Neungtrakarn Por Muang Ubon	Kings Birthday	Bangkok, Thailand			
Wins the World Muaythai title.
1998-11-21	Win	(Thailand) Kriengkrai Sor.Worapin	Muaythai Gala in Marseilles	Marseilles, France	KO		
1998	Loss	(Thailand) Kriengkrai Sor.Worapin	Muaythai Gala in Paris	Paris, France	TKO (Elbow/Cut)	5	3:00
1997-	Win	(Netherlands) Najim Touhlali		Paris, France	Decision	5	3:00
Defends the ISKA World Muaythai title.
1997-02-01	Draw	(France) Moussa Sissoko	Le Choc des Champions	Paris, France	Decision Draw	5	3:00
1997	Win	(Thailand) Changpuek Kiatsongrit	Muaythai Gala in Paris	Paris, France	KO (Punches)	3	
199-	Draw	(Thailand) Kriengkrai Sor.Worapin			Decision	5	3:00
199-	Loss	(Thailand) Kriengkrai Sor.Worapin					
1996	Win	(France) Aurélien Duarte			Decision	5	3:00
1996	Win	(Australia) Paul Briggs	Muaythai Gala in Australia	Australia	KO (Knee)	2	
1996-01-19	Win	(United States) Drake White	La Nuit des Champions		TKO (Referee stoppage)	3	
1994-12-04	Loss	(Thailand) Nokweed Devy	King's Birthday	Chiang Rai City, Thailand	Decision	5	3:00
1993-12-05	Loss	(Thailand) Changpuek Kiatsongrit	King's Birthday	Thailand	KO (Low kick)	4	
1993-	Loss	(Thailand) Krongsak Sakkasem	Salle des Sports Marcel Cerdan	Levallois, France	Decision	5	3:00
For the World Muaythai title.
1993-06-04	Loss	(Thailand) Krongsak Sakkasem	Stade Pierre de Coubertin	Paris, France	Decision	5	3:00
For the World Muaythai title.
1992-06-20	Win	(Morocco) Mustapha Lakhsem	Salle des Sports Marcel Cerdan	Levallois, France	TKO (Gave up)	3	
1992	Loss	(Thailand) Changpuek Kiatsongrit	Thailand	Bangkok, Thailand	KO (Left Low Kick)	4	
1991-06-00	Win	(France) Farid Rezzag	Muaythai Gala in Palais des Sports	Nanterre, France	Decision	5	3:00
Defends the European Muaythai title (-69 kg).
1990	Loss	(Thailand) Somsong Kiathoranee	Muaythai Gala in Halle Carpentier	Paris, France	KO (Liver shot)	3	
1989-12-24	Loss	(Thailand) Somsong Kiathoranee	Muaythai Gala in Paris	Paris, France	Decision	5	3:00
For the World Muaythai title.
1989-11-23	Win	(United Kingdom) Keith Nathan	Lamy Gym présente BOXE-THAI	Paris, France	KO (Knee)	2	
1989-	Win	(Thailand) Youssop Sor.Thanikul		France	KO (Knee to the head)		
1989-04-21	Win	(Thailand) Mongkorndej		France	KO		
1986-	Win	(Thailand)	Gala in Palais des Sports	Paris, France			
1986-	Win	(Netherlands) Mustafa Yamali	Kick-Thai-Boxing Gala	Amsterdam, Netherlands	Decision	5	3:00
1986-	Win	(England)	Gala in Salle Jappy	Paris, France	KO (Knee)		
1985-12-28	Loss	(Netherlands) Orlando Wiet	European Muaythai Championship		Decision	5	3:00
Fight was for European Muaythai title.
1985	Win	(France)	French Muaythai Championship	France			
Wins the French Muaythai title.
Legend: Win Loss Draw/No contest Notes

== See also ==
- List of male kickboxers
