= Manson Gibson =

Retired American kickboxer

- Born: Manson Howard Gibson; May 5, 1963 (age 63); Chicago, Illinois, United States
- Other names: The Master Blaster; The Thai Killer; The Black Bruce Lee
- Nationality: American
- Height: 1.80 m (5 ft 11 in)
- Weight: 80 kg (180 lb; 13 st)
- Division: Middleweight; Super Middleweight; Light Heavyweight; Cruiserweight
- Style: Boxing; Taekwondo; Northern Praying Mantis Kung Fu
- Fighting out of: Chicago, Illinois, United States
- Team: Windy City Gym

Kickboxing record
- Total: 119
- Wins: 103
- By knockout: 80
- Losses: 14
- Draws: 2

Mixed martial arts record
- Total: 2
- Losses: 1
- By submission: 1
- Draws: 1

Amateur record
- Total: 11
- Wins: 10
- By knockout: 8
- Losses: 1
- Last updated on: October 12, 2012

Manson Howard Gibson (born May 5, 1961) is a retired American kickboxer and a 12-time world champion in kickboxing and Muay Thai. He was known for his vicious use of spinning techniques and wild, unpredictable style, mixing elements of kickboxing, Taekwondo and Northern Praying Mantis martial arts. He was sometimes referred to as the "Thai Killer" or the "Black Bruce Lee". Gibson was one of America's greatest kickboxers, and is credited with over 100 wins and more than 80 KOs, including around 40 via headkick.

== Biography and career ==
After a series of early career wins and claiming titles such as the K.I.C.K. Super Middleweight World Championship, Gibson found the competition at home (aside from two losses to Rick Roufus) uninspiring. So in the late 1980s and well into the 1990s, while many American fighters were fighting one another for a multitude of so-called "world titles", Manson headed across to Japan where he fought and beat top fighters such as Caesar Takeshi, Tosca Petridis and Changpuek Kiatsongrit, often fighting under different rule sets such as Shoot Boxing, K-1 and Muay Thai.

During his period spent fighting in Japan, Gibson entered the inaugural K-2 Grand Prix in 1993. K-2 was a short lived series of tournaments held by the K-1 organization for Light Heavyweights and the 1993 event was held in Tokyo. In the tournament quarter finals he faced the highly decorated Ernesto Hoost, with Hoost, the recent K-1 Heavyweight Grand Prix runner-up, the strong favorite and on his way to becoming a legend. Gibson proved in that fight that he could hang with the world's best, knocking Hoost down with his trademark spinning backfist. However, despite the knockdown, the match went to an extra round where Gibson again knocked down Hoost, this time with a sidekick. Gibson lost a split decision.

In 1996 Gibson fought a mixed martial arts bout against Yoji Anjo which resulted in a draw. Gibson returned to the United States around 1998, defeating a legend in Coban Lookchaomaesaitong. The match in Compton, was one in which Gibson had the MC announce himself as the "Thai Killer" and at the end of the fight did back flips next to the prone Coban. That year Gibson also won the I.K.K.C. Muaythai world title by defeating Maurice Travis, also in Los Angeles. Over the next couple of years he would defend his I.K.K.C. world title four more times with the highlight being a second victory over seven-time World Champion Changpuek Kiatsongrit – although as with the Coban fight his match antics left a sour taste in the mouth.

On April 7, 2000 Gibson won the I.K.F. Pro Muay Thai Rules Light Cruiserweight North American title in Green Bay Wisconsin when he defeated Phil Petit of Sik Tai, Winnipeg, Manitoba, Canada by KO with a spinning backfist in the first round. Gibson retired his title in 2005 when he moved up in weight. When Gibson won this title it was called the Light Cruiserweight title but the weightclass was different: 175.1 lbs. - 182 lbs. The weightclass range was later changed but Gibson's title remained Light Cruiserweight.

Around 2002 age started catching up with Gibson who was approaching his forties and he lost his I.K.K.C. world title to Frenchman Manu N'toh. A win against Heath Harris in 2004 for the I.K.K.C. proved he could still be competitive, although his opponent Harris had only had a handful of professional fights prior to the encounter. Always one to try different fighting styles Gibson again had a brief foray into MMA in 2006. By the end of 2009, with the losses stacking up after a series of unsuccessful title fights, Gibson retired.

== Titles ==
- 2004 I.K.K.C. Pro Muay Thai Light Heavyweight World Champion −81.3 kg
- 1999 I.K.F. Pro Muay Thai Light Cruiserweight North American Champion −84.5 kg
- 1998–02 I.K.K.C. Muay Thai Light Heavyweight World Champion (four title defenses)
- 1989 Shoot boxing Hawk Class World Champion −75 kg
- Ring Fighting Arts World Champion
- U.K.F. Super Middleweight World Champion
- K.I.C.K. Light Heavyweight Champion
- K.I.C.K. Super Middleweight World Champion
- W.A.K.O. (PRO) Super Middleweight World Champion
- W.K.A. Super Middleweight World Champion
- I.K.L. Middleweight Champion

== Kickboxing record ==
Kickboxing record
115 wins (80 (T)KOs), 14 losses, 2 draws
Date	Result	Opponent	Event	Location	Method	Round	Time
2009-12-05	Loss	(United States) Shawn Yarborough	WCK Muay Thai @ Buffalo Bill's	Primm, NV, USA	TKO (quit)	2	3:00
Fight was for vacant W.B.C. Muaythai light heavyweight United States title -79.4 kg.
2008-06-18	Loss	(Mexico) Edwin Aguilar	Muay Thai Fight Night	Montego Bay, Jamaica	TKO (quit)	3	3:00
Fight was for vacant I.K.F. Pro Muaythai Cruiserweight World Title -88.6 kg.
2007-07-07	Loss	(Russia) Denis Grachev	Hot Summer Fights	Inglewood, CA, USA	TKO (corner stop/knees)	3	0:27
Fight was for vacant I.K.F. Pro Muaythai Light Cruiserweight World Title -84.5 kg.
2004-11-20	Loss	(Canada) Clifton Brown	Matter of Pride 8	Los Angeles, CA, USA	TKO (leg kicks)	4	
Fight was for I.K.K.C. cruiserweight world title -82 kg.
2004-10-21	Win	(United States) Heath Harris	Guts and Glory	San Bernardino, CA, USA	Decision (unanimous)	5	3:00
Wins vacant I.K.K.C. Pro Muaythai light heavyweight world title -81.3 kg.
0000-00-00	Win	(United States) Bill Rastafar		USA	KO (body punch)	3	3:00
2003-06-28	Loss	(United States) Stefan Pellegrino	Chicago Fight Night 2003: Tales Of Pain	Chicago, IL, USA	KO (left hook)	2	2:17
2003-00-00	Win	(United States) Wrath White		United States	Decision (unanimous)	3	3:00
2002-11-15	Loss	(France) Manu N'toh	W.C.K. "A Matter of Pride VI"	Victorville, CA, USA	Decision (unanimous)	5	3:00
Loses I.K.K.C. Muaythai light heavyweight world title.
2002-03-23	Loss	(Australia) Nick Karagiannidis	Master Toddy Show @ Stardust Casino	Las Vegas, NV, USA	Decision	5	3:00
2001-12-14	Win	(Thailand) Changpuek Kiatsongrit	W.C.K. @ Palms Casino Resort	Las Vegas, NV, USA	KO (spinning heel kick)	2	
Retains I.K.K.C. Muaythai light heavyweight world title (4th title defence).
2000-12-02	Loss	(Hungary) Robert Sarkozi	10th World Shidokan Invitational, Quarter Finals	Chicago, IL, USA	DQ (constant fouling)	4	
2000-07-04	Win	(Canada) Phil Petit	Stadium View Sports Bar	Green Bay, WI, USA	KO (spinning back fist)	1	
Wins vacant I.K.F. Pro Muaythai Light Cruiserweight North American title -84.5 kg. When Gibson won this title it was called the Light Cruiserweight title but the weightclass was different: 175.1 lbs. - 182 lbs. The weightclass range was later changed but Gibson's title remained Light Cruiserweight.
1999-09-11	Loss	(United States) Richard Stellwagen	Summer Brawl	Franklin Park, IL, USA	Decision (split)	8	2:00
Fight was for vacant I.K.F. Pro Full-Contact Light Heavyweight United States title -81.3 kg.
1998-07-07	Win	(Thailand) Coban Lookchaomaesaitong	Crystal Park Casino Outdoor Show	Los Angeles, CA, USA	TKO (right back kick)	5	1:59
1998-06-27	Win	(United States) Maurice Travis		Los Angeles, CA, USA	Decision	5	3:00
Wins vacant I.K.K.C. Muaythai light heavyweight world title.
1998-04-26	Win	(Thailand) Changpuek Kiatsongrit	Shooto "Shoot the Shooto XX"	Tokyo, Japan	Decision (unanimous)	3	3:00
1996-07-14	Draw	(Thailand) Yarsin Loogklongtan	Shoot Boxing - S-Cup 1996, Super Fight	Tokyo, Japan	2 ext.R decision draw	5	3:00
1995-10-15	Win	(Netherlands) Luc Verheye	MA Japan Kickboxing Federation	Tokyo, Japan	Decision	5	3:00
1995-03-25	Win	(Italy) Bartolomeo Danbrosio	World Cup Of Martial arts	Ledyard, CT, USA	KO	1	0:31
1994-06-10	Win	(Japan) Taro Minato		Tulsa, Oklahoma, USA	KO	3	2:34
Wins Minato U.K.F Super middle weight world title
1994-00-00	Win	(Russia) Sergei Mayfat	HardKnock 4	Atlantic City, NJ, USA	Decision	10	2:00
1993-12-29	Loss	(Netherlands) Ernesto Hoost	K-2 Grand Prix '93, Quarter Final	Tokyo, Japan	Ext.R decision (majority)	4	3:00
1993-05-01	No contest	(United States) Mark Gurley	Karate International Council of Kickboxing	Cocoa, FL, USA			
Fight was for vacant K.I.C.K. world middleweight title
1993-01-30	Win	(Japan) Taro Minato	MA Japan Kickboxing Federation	Tokyo, Japan	Decision	5	3:00
1992-07-30	Loss	(Japan) Taiei Kin	Seidokaikan Kakutogi Olympic II	Tokyo, Japan	DQ (illegal punch)	4	
1992-03-21	Win	(Thailand) Sayidkhan Kiatpathan	Martial Arts Japan Kickboxing Association	Japan	TKO (spinning high kick)	2	
0000-00-00	Win	(Netherlands) Luc Verheye		Tokyo, Japan	Decision	5	3:00
1990-07-06	Win	(Japan) Hideo Suzuki	'90 Kakutougi no saiten	Tokyo, Japan	KO	2	1:58
1990-07-01	Win	(Japan) Naoyuki Taira	Shoot boxing BATTLE GAME	Tokyo, Japan	KO	4	4:01
Wins Taira Shoot boxing Hawk Class world title -75 kg.
1990-01-03	Win	(Japan) Koichi Koide	Dojo 20th Anniversary kick	Tokyo, Japan	KO	1	
0000-00-00	Win	(United States) Johnny Davis		United States	KO	9	
Wins Davis PKA middleweight USA title
1989-05-26	Win	(Japan) Caesar Takeshi	Tokyo Korakuen Hall Shoot Boxing	Tokyo, Japan	KO (spinning mid kick)	1	4:28
Wins Caesar Shoot boxing Hawk Class world title -75 kg.
1989-04-01	Loss	(United States) Rick Roufus		United States	Decision		
1987-09-01	Loss	(United States) Rick Roufus		United States	Decision		
1987-03-17	Loss	(United States) Roy McCown	PKC Kickboxing	Rockford, USA	Decision	7	3:00
Legend: Win Loss Draw/no contest Notes

== Mixed martial arts record ==
MMA record
0 wins, 0 losses, 1 draw
Date	Result	Opponent	Event	Location	Method	Round	Time
1996-01-27	Draw	Yoji Anjo	Shootfighting Carnival Ground Zero Yokohama ~Fighting Festival	Yokohama, Japan	Draw	1	20 minutes 1R end time limit
Legend: Win Loss Draw/no contest Notes

== See also ==
- List of male kickboxers
- List of K-1 events
