= Ivan Hippolyte =

Surinamese-Dutch kickboxer (born 1964)

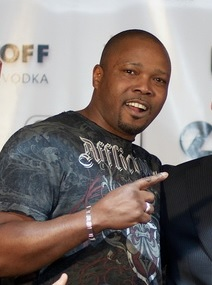
- Born: 7 October 1964 (age 62); Suriname
- Other names: Hippo, The Hydro
- Height: 1.78 m (5 ft 10 in)
- Weight: 75 kg (165 lb; 11.8 st)
- Division: Welterweight; Middleweight
- Style: Kickboxing, Muay Thai, Savate
- Stance: Orthodox
- Fighting out of: Amsterdam, Netherlands
- Team: Vos Gym
- Trainer: Johan Vos, Jan Plas

Kickboxing record
- Total: 82
- Wins: 69
- By knockout: 37
- Losses: 10
- Draws: 3

Other information
- Occupation: Martial arts instructor
- Notable students: Mirko Filipović, Remy Bonjasky

Ivan "The Hydro" Hippolyte (born 7 October 1964) is a Surinamese-Dutch former kickboxer. He was a multiple world champion in kickboxing and Muay Thai. He was the winner of the K-3 Grand Prix '95.

After he retired, he became the chairman and coach at the Vos Gym in Amsterdam, the same gym where he trained during his fighting career. He was a sparring partner and teammate of four-time K-1 World champion Ernesto Hoost as well as veteran mixed martial artist Gilbert Yvel. He was also a trainer of K-1 World Champion Remy Bonjasky and Mirko Filipović.

== Titles ==
- 1995 K-3 Grand Prix '95 Champion
- 1995 W.M.T.C. Middleweight World Champion at Lumpinee Stadium, Bangkok, Thailand
- 1994 K-3 Dutch Edition Tournament Champion -76.2 kg
- M.T.B.N. World Champion
- W.M.T.A. World Champion -72 kg
- 1988 W.K.A. Welterweight World Champion
- 4 times E.M.T.A. European Muay Thai Champion
- 1986 European Champion Savate

== Fight record ==
Kickboxing record
69 wins (37 (T)KOs), 10 losses, 3 draws
| Date | Result | Opponent | Event | Location | Method | Round | Time |
| 2000-10-22 | Win | (Suriname) Rayen Simson | It's Showtime - Exclusive | Haarlem, Netherlands | TKO (leg injury) | 4 | 1:00 |
| 2000-06-04 | Win | (Morocco) Hassan Ettaki | Night of Revenge | Haarlem, Netherlands | Decision | 5 | 3:00 |
| 1999-09-05 | Loss | (Netherlands) Perry Ubeda | Battle of Arnhem I | Arnhem, Netherlands | TKO (shin injury) | 1 | |
| 1999-10-24 | Loss | (Suriname) Rayen Simson | It's Showtime - It's Showtime | Haarlem, Netherlands | Decision | 5 | 3:00 |
| 1998-05-31 | Win | (Netherlands) Perry Ubeda | Fight of the Decade | Amsterdam, Netherlands | Decision | 5 | 3:00 |
| 1996-11-16 | Loss | (Morocco) Hassan Ettaki | Night of Dynamite | Amsterdam, Netherlands | TKO (cut on shin) | 1 | |
| 1996-09-01 | Loss | (New Zealand) Jason Suttie | K-1 Revenge '96 | Osaka, Japan | Decision (unanimous) | 5 | 3:00 |
| 1996 | Loss | (Thailand) Sakmongkol Sithchuchok | | Pattaya, Thailand | Decision (unanimous) | 5 | 3:00 |
Loses W.M.T.C. Muay Thai Middleweight World title.
| 1995-11-18 | Win | (Thailand) Pompetch Naratreekul | Lumpinee Stadium | Bangkok, Thailand | KO | 3 | |
Wins the vacant W.M.T.C. Muay Thai Middleweight World title.
| 1995-07-16 | Win | (Japan) Taiei Kin | K-3 Grand Prix '95, Final | Nagoya, Japan | Ext.R decision (majority) | 4 | 3:00 |
Wins K-3 Grand Prix '95 title.
| 1995-07-16 | Win | (Japan) Toshiyuki Atokawa | K-3 Grand Prix '95, Semi Finals | Nagoya, Japan | 2nd ext.R decision (unanimous) | 5 | 3:00 |
| 1995-07-16 | Win | (Thailand) Changpuek Kiatsongrit | K-3 Grand Prix '95, Quarter Finals | Nagoya, Japan | KO (punch) | 2 | 0:20 |
| 1995-04-02 | Loss | (Suriname) Orlando Wiet | | Amsterdam, Netherlands | Decision | 5 | 3:00 |
| 1994-09-15 | Win | (Netherlands) Faizel Reding | K-3 Dutch Edition Tournament, Final | Amsterdam, Netherlands | Decision | 5 | 3:00 |
Wins K-3 Dutch Edition tournament title -76.2 kg.
| 1994-04-30 | Win | (Japan) Hiromu Yoshitaka | K-1 Grand Prix '94, Super Fight | Tokyo, Japan | Decision (unanimous) | 5 | 3:00 |
| 1992-10-25 | Win | (Thailand) Vichan Chorrotchai | Holland vs Thailand: The Revenge | Amsterdam, Netherlands | Decision | 5 | 3:00 |
| 1992-04-26 | Win | (United Kingdom) Steve Scott | | Amsterdam, Netherlands | KO | 3 | |
| 1992-03-01 | Loss | (Thailand) Jomhod Kiatadisak | Holland vs Thailand 7 | Netherlands | Decision | 5 | 3:00 |
| 1991-10-20 | Win | (Netherlands) Brian Pieters | Hot Night in Amsterdam | Amsterdam, Netherlands | Decision (unanimous) | 5 | 3:00 |
| 1991-04-21 | Win | (Suriname) Orlando Wiet | Kickboxing "Holland vs Canada" | Amsterdam, Netherlands | Decision | 5 | 3:00 |
| 1991-04-21 | Loss | (Thailand) Mungkordet Kiatprasarnchai | Holland vs Thailand VI | Amsterdam, Netherlands | Decision | 5 | 3:00 |
| 1991 | Draw | (Thailand) Krongsak Sakcharoenchai | | Amsterdam, Netherlands | Decision | 5 | 3:00 |
| 1990-12-10 | Loss | (Thailand) Mungkordet Kiatprasarnchai | | Bangkok, Thailand | KO (knee) | | |
| 1990-10-14 | Win | (Thailand) Mungkordet Kiatprasarnchai | Holland vs Thailand V | Amsterdam, Netherlands | Decision | 5 | 3:00 |
Wins W.M.T.A. Muay Thai World title -74 kg.
| 1990-04-01 | Win | (England) Tony Moore | Holland vs England | Amsterdam, Netherlands | TKO (gave up) | 4 | |
| 1990 | Win | (Thailand) Jomhod Kiatadisak | | Phoenix, Arizona, USA | TKO (punches) | 3 | |
| 1989-10-08 | Win | (France) Guillaume Kerner | | Amsterdam, Netherlands | Decision | 3 | 3:00 |
| 1989-04- | Loss | (Thailand) Krongsak Sakcharoenchai | | Paris, France | Decision | 5 | 3:00 |
| 1988-11-20 | Win | (Suriname) Orlando Wiet | | Netherlands | Decision | 5 | 3:00 |
| 1988-06-11 | Win | (Thailand) Neth Saknarong | Champions in Action | Amsterdam, Netherlands | TKO (punches) | 2 | |
| 1988 | Win | (United States) David Humphries | | | | | |
Wins W.K.A. Welterweight World title.
| 1987 | Win | (England) Humphrey Harrison | Champions of Champions | U.K. | Decision (unanimous) | 5 | 3:00 |
Retains E.M.T.A. Muay Thai European title.
| 1985-05-26 | Win | (Morocco) Habib Ben-Salah | | Netherlands | TKO (referee stoppage, knee) | | |
| | Win | (Thailand) Sithisak Tor. Anusorn | | Thailand | KO | 1 | |
Legend: Win Loss Draw/no contest Notes

== See also ==
- List of K-1 events
- List of male kickboxers
