= Changpuek Kiatsongrit =

Thai former professional Muay Thai fighter and kickboxer (born 1966)

- Born: Somchai Ropkwaen; October 13, 1966 (age 60)
- Native name: สมชาย รอบแคว้น
- Nickname: White Elephant
- Height: 175 cm (5 ft 9 in)
- Division: Middleweight; Light Heavyweight; Cruiserweight; Heavyweight
- Style: Muay Thai
- Stance: Southpaw

Kickboxing record
- Total: 343
- Wins: 277
- By knockout: 178
- Losses: 61
- Draws: 5

Other information
- Occupation: Muay Thai trainer
- Notable relatives: Kongsak Sitboonmee (nephew)

Somchai Ropkwaen (Thai: สมชาย รอบแคว้น; born October 13, 1966), known professionally as Changpuek Kiatsongrit (Thai: ช้างเผือก เกียรติทรงฤทธิ์) is a Thai former professional Muay Thai fighter and kickboxer. He is credited as being one of the first Muay Thai fighters to go abroad and fight other fighters of other martial arts styles, often stronger and heavier than himself, bringing to the world an understanding of the effectiveness of Muay Thai. Changpuek is a seven time world champion who has fought some of the world's best fighters at middleweight to heavyweight and has wins against world class fighters such as Rob Kaman (x3), Rick Roufus, Peter Smit and Tosca Petridis. After ending his career as a professional fighter while working for Sitpholek gym in Pattaya, Thailand, he continued his employment at that gym as a Muay Thai trainer.

== Biography and career ==
Changpuek was born and raised in a small village some 30 km from the town of Prakhonchai, Buriram in northeastern Thailand, one of seven children. A young Changpuek became attracted to Muay Thai from watching local fighters and started training at home alongside his brothers under the tutelage of their father. He had his first fight at 14 and by 18 had left home to join the Kiatsongrit Gym in Bangkok, where he would remain for more than sixteen years. Changpuek fought at the lower weights in his early years spent on the Bangkok circuit, weighing as little as 49 kg (108 lbs) on his Rajadamnern Stadium debut.

After fighting for a number of years in Thailand, Changpuek found it increasingly difficult to get fights domestically as his weight (70 kg) was not typical for a Thai where competitive bouts at tend to be at the lower weights. As a result, he started to fight abroad facing the K.I.C.K. world champion Rick Roufus in a non-title fight in Las Vegas in 1988. Changpuek's leg kicks proved too much for Roufus, despite being knocked down in the first and suffering a broken jaw, won via technical knockout (TKO) in the fourth round. The TKO was due to a culmination of low kicks that the American fighter greatly underestimated and was drastically unprepared for. In 1989 Changpuek faced another top class fighter in Rob Kaman. Changpuek won the first match of four between the two by decision in Paris setting the way for a rematch in Amsterdam the following year this time with the added bonus of the I.M.T.F. light heavyweight world title. Kaman gained his revenge in Amsterdam knocking out Changpuek in the last round of their match. The third match between the pair followed two months later with Changpuek taking a decision victory and the belt which Kaman had only just won. In 1989, Changpuek participated in the professional wrestling event U-COSMOS promoted by the Universal Wrestling Federation. The event was built as a "interstyle combat matches" where UWF shoot wrestlers would face of fighters from other martial arts and combat sports. Changpuek fought Yoji Anjo to a five-round draw.

After his trilogy of fights with Kaman, Changpuek would continue to fight some of the top light heavyweight fighters in the world between 1990 and 1992, losing one and winning one against Peter Smit, defeating Luc Verheye by knockout and decisioning Orlando Wiet. In this period he would lose and regain his I.M.T.F. world title and claim the first ever W.M.K. world belt. In 1993 Changpuek was invited to compete against some of the world's top heavyweight kickboxers at the inaugural K-1 world grand prix, losing to eventual winner Branko Cikatić by knockout at the quarter-final stage. He was invited back by the organization to take part in a world title fight - defeating Taiei Kin over five rounds to claim the vacant U.K.F. belt.

1993 would continue to be a busy year for Changpuek, he fought on cards throughout the year in Japan picking up several victories as well as losing to legendary karateka Andy Hug at the karate world cup. At the end of the year he fought in the K-2 Grand Prix '93 a tournament held by K-1 for light heavyweight fighters. As the smallest fighter at the event weighing only 75 kg, Changpuek faced Rob Kaman in the fourth (and final) match of their quartet of fights, winning a grueling match by decision. A victory in the semi-finals against Tasis Petridis meant a final match against future four-time K-1 world champion Ernesto Hoost. Changpuek managed to push the much larger Hoost into an extra round only to lose eventually via a head kick knockout.

Although Changpuek would never again quite hit the peak of his success of the early nineties, he fought a number more times with the K-1 organization, the highlight being a victory against Nobuaki Kakuda to claim the W.M.T.C. cruiserweight world title and wins against the likes of Kakuda were tempered by defeats against Michael Thompson, Ivan Hippolyte and Manson Gibson. Changpuek fought a number of fights in Europe around the turn of the millennium winning the W.K.U. world title in 2001 but found victories harder to come by as the toll of career of 300+ fights set in and he retired around 2006 at the age of 40. He currently resides in Pattaya, Thailand where he is the father of two children and is a Muay Thai coach. His nephew, Kongsak Sithboonmee, was named Thailand's top Muay Thai boxer in April 2011.

== Titles and accomplishments ==
=== Muay Thai ===
- World Muay Thai Council
  - 1996 W.M.T.C. Cruiserweight World Champion -86 kg
- International Muay Thai Federation
  - 1992 I.M.T.F. Light Heavyweight World Champion -79 kg (1st title defence)
  - 1990 I.M.T.F Light Heavyweight World Champion -79 kg (retained title after losing it the same year)
  - 1990 I.M.T.F Light Heavyweight World Champion -79 kg
- World Muaythai Kickboxing
  - 1991 W.M.K. Heavyweight World Champion

=== Kickboxing ===
- Kickboxing Superstar
  - 2003 Kickboxing Superstar WGP Qualifications Tournament Runner-up
- World Kickboxing Union
  - 2001 W.K.U. Cruiserweight World Champion
- K-1
  - 1993 K-2 Grand Prix Runner-up -79 kg
- Universal Kickboxing Federation
  - 1993-94 U.K.F. Light Heavyweight World Champion -79 kg (0 title defences)

=== Awards ===
Awards

- 1990 Fighter Magazine Fighter of the Year

== Fight record ==
Kickboxing record
277 Wins (178 (T)KO's, 99 decisions), 61 Losses, 5 Draws
Date	Result	Opponent	Event	Location	Method	Round	Time
2010	Loss	(Slovakia) Martin Sithpolek	Fairtex Stadium	Pattaya, Thailand	TKO	2	
2006-12-27	Loss	(France) Johan Gouaida	Sitpholek Muaythai Promotion	Pattaya, Thailand	KO (Punches)	1	
2006-11-25	Loss	(Netherlands) Martin van Emmen	Only the Strongest	Ter Apel, Netherlands	KO	1	
2003-05-17	Win	(France) Frédérique Bellonie	Kickboxing Superstar WGP Qualifications, Final	Milan, Italy	Decision (Unanimous)	3	3:00
Fails to Qualifie for Kickboxing Superstar tournament.
2003-05-17	Win	(Greece) Babis Papadoupolous	Kickboxing Superstar WGP Qualifications, Semi finals	Milan, Italy	Decision (Split)	3	3:00
2002-11-24	Loss	(Croatia) Igor Ivošević		Rijeka, Croatia	DQ (Kneeing Opponent)	2	
2001-12-14	Loss	(United States) Manson Gibson	W.C.K. @ Palms Casino Resort	Las Vegas, United States	KO (Spinning Heel Kick)	2	0:48
Fight was for Gibson's I.K.K.C. Muaythai light heavyweight world title.
2001-11-03	Win	(Netherlands) Martin van Emmen	Gala in Steenwijk	Steenwijk, Netherlands	KO (Right Hook)	2	
Wins the vacant W.K.U. Cruiserweight World title.
2001-03-03	Loss	(Suriname) Ashwin Balrak	WPKL Muay Thai Champions League IV	Rotterdam, Netherlands	KO (Right knee to the body)	3	
1999-07-11	Loss	(Japan) Ryuji Murakami	The Kakidamishi 1	Okinawa, Japan	Decision (Unanimous)	5	3:00
1998-10-25	Win	(Japan) Ryuji Murakami	MA Kick "Kickboxing Champion Wars All Star Matches"	Tokyo, Japan	Decision (Unanimous)	5	3:00
1998-04-26	Loss	(United States) Manson Gibson	Shoot boxing "Shoot the Shooto XX"	Tokyo, Japan	Decision (Unanimous)	3	3:00
1997-07-13	Draw	(Morocco) Hassan Ettaki	Night of the Titans	Rabat, Morocco	Decision Draw	5	3:00
1997-04-29	Win	(Japan) Nobuaki Kakuda	K-1 Braves '97	Fukuoka, Japan	Decision (Unanimous)	5	3:00
Wins W.M.T.C. Cruiserweight World Title.
1997	Loss	(France) Stéphane Nikiéma	Muaythai Gala in Paris	Paris, France	KO (Punches)	3	
1996-03-01	Win	(Japan) Hiromitsu Kanehara	UWF International	Tokyo, Japan	Decision (Unanimous)	5	3:00
1995-10-08	Loss	(Turkey) Gurkan Ozcan	The Test of Courage	Australia	KO (Punches)	1	1:58
1995-07-16	Loss	(Netherlands) Ivan Hippolyte	K-3 Grand Prix '95 Quarter-final	Nagoya, Japan	KO	2	0:20
1995-03-25	Win	(Japan) Takashi Sugiyama	K-1 K-League Opening Fight	Tokyo, Japan	Decision (Unanimous)	5	3:00
1994-09-18	Loss	(England) Michael Thompson	K-1 Revenge	Yokohama, Japan	KO (Left Spinning Kick)	3	0:02
1994-03-04	Loss	(Japan) Taiei Kin	K-1 Challenge	Tokyo, Japan	Decision (Unanimous)	5	3:00
Loses his U.K.F. World Lightheavyweight championship title.
1993-12-19	Loss	(Netherlands) Ernesto Hoost	K-2 Grand Prix '93 Final	Tokyo, Japan	TKO (Right High Kick)	4	0:40
Fight was for K-2 Grand Prix '93 World Championship title -79 kg.
1993-12-19	Win	(Greece) Tosca Petridis	K-2 Grand Prix '93 Semi-final	Tokyo, Japan	Decision (Unanimous)	3	3:00
1993-12-19	Win	(Netherlands) Rob Kaman	K-2 Grand Prix '93 Quarter-final	Tokyo, Japan	Decision (Unanimous)	3	3:00
1993-12-05	Win	(France) Stéphane Nikiéma	Thailand	Thailand	KO (Left Low Kick)	4	
1993-10-03	Loss	(Switzerland) Andy Hug	K-1 Illusion 1993 Karate World Cup Quarter-final	Osaka, Japan	Decision (Unanimous)	1	3:00
1993-10-03	Win	(Japan) Shin Ushikoshi	K-1 Illusion 1993 Karate World Cup 1st round	Osaka, Japan	Decision (Unanimous)	1	3:00
1993-09-04	Win	(Japan) Toshiyuki Atokawa	K-1 Illusion	Tokyo, Japan	Decision (Unanimous)	5	3:00
1993-06-25	Win	(Japan) Taiei Kin	K-1 Sanctuary III	Osaka, Japan	Decision (Unanimous)	5	3:00
Wins the vacant U.K.F. World Light heavyweight championship title -79 kg.
1993-04-30	Loss	(Croatia) Branko Cikatic	K-1 Grand Prix '93 Quarter-final	Tokyo, Japan	KO (Right Straight)	1	2:35
1992	Win	(Suriname) Orlando Wiet		Oldham, United Kingdom	Decision (Split)	5	3:00
Retains I.M.T.F. Light Heavyweight World title.
1992	Win	(France) Stéphane Nikiéma		Bangkok, Thailand	KO (Left Low Kick)	4	
1991-05-24	Win	(Netherlands) Marlon Benjamin	Yamaki Gym the 6th anniversary memorial event	Tokyo, Japan	KO (Left Straight)	2	2:18
Wins the vacant 1st W.M.K. World Heavyweight Championship title.
1990-12-15	Win	(Netherlands) Luc Verheije	MAJKF	Tokyo, Japan	TKO (Knee strike)	3	
1990-11-27	Win	(Netherlands) Peter Smit	Lumpinee Stadium	Bangkok, Thailand	Decision	5	3:00
Wins Smit's I.M.T.F. light heavyweight world title -79 kg.
1990-09-28	Win	(Netherlands) Glenn Brasdorp	A.J.K.F Inspiring Wars "Heat-928"	Tokyo, Japan	Decision (Unanimous)	5	3:00
1990-08-31	Loss	(Netherlands) Peter Smit	Lumpinee Stadium	Bangkok, Thailand	KO (Punches)	2	
Loses I.M.T.F. light heavyweight world title -79 kg.
1990-06-30	Win	(United States) Dale Cook	AJKF "Inspiring Wars Heat 630"	Tokyo, Japan	KO (Right Hook)	2	1:28
1990-05-18	Win	(Japan) Hideo Suzuki	MA Nihon Kick	Tokyo, Japan	KO (Low Kicks)	2	
1990-04-24	Win	(Netherlands) Rob Kaman	Holland Goes to Thailand, Lumpinee Stadium	Bangkok, Thailand	Decision	5	3:00
Wins Kaman's I.M.T.F. light heavyweight world title -79 kg.
1990-02-18	Loss	(Netherlands) Rob Kaman	Holland vs Thailand 1990	Amsterdam, Netherlands	KO	5	
Fight was for vacant I.M.T.F. Light Heavyweight World title -79 kg.
1989-12-31	Win	(Netherlands) Rob Kaman		Paris, France	Decision	5	3:00
1988-11-05	Win	(United States) Rick Roufus	Sands Hotel & Casino	Las Vegas, United States	KO (Left Low Kicks)	5	1:23
1988-05-28	Win	(Thailand) Mongkoldej Kiatprasarnchai	Monoi Stadium	Samut Sakhon, Thailand	Decision	5	3:00
1988-	Win	(Thailand) Payap Premchai	Lumpinee Stadium	Bangkok, Thailand	KO (Low kicks)	1	
1987-10-30	Loss	(Thailand) Krongsak Na Teerawong		Bangkok, Thailand	KO	3	
1987-07-04	Loss	(Thailand) Mongkoldej Kiatprasarnchai		Sakon Nakhon, Thailand	Decision	5	3:00
1987-06-20	Loss	(Thailand) Khunponnoi Por.Pongsawang	Omnoi Stadium	Samut Sakhon, Thailand	Decision	5	3:00
1987-04-24	Win	(Thailand) Payap Premchai	Rangsit Stadium	Pathum Thani, Thailand	DQ (threw a kick)	4	
Handicap match. Payap was not allowed to kick.
1987-03-20	Win	(Thailand) Raktae Muangsurin	Rangsit Stadium	Pathum Thani, Thailand	Decision	5	3:00
1987-03-06	Win	(Thailand) Krongsak Sakkasem		Ubon Ratchathani province, Thailand	Decision	5	3:00
1987-01-30	Win	(Thailand) Thong Lukbansuan	Rangsit Stadium	Pathum Thani, Thailand	Decision	5	3:00
?	Win	(Thailand) Samart Prasarnmit		Thailand	Decision	5	3:00
1986-10-31	Win	(Thailand) Punthai Pinsinchai	Rangsit Stadium	Pathum Thani, Thailand	Decision	5	3:00
1986-08-08	Loss	(Thailand) Raktae Muangsurin	Rangsit Stadium	Pathum Thani, Thailand	KO (Right cross)	3	
1984-09-21	Win	(Thailand) Saming Chansongkram	Boonthit Stadium	Surin province, Thailand	Decision	5	3:00
1982-12-08	Loss	(Thailand) Rungsiri Na Pattaya	Rajadamnern Stadium	Bangkok, Thailand	Decision	5	3:00
Legend: Win Loss Draw/No contest Notes

== Mixed rules ==
Professional record breakdown
1 match	wins	losses
Draws	1	

Res.	Record	Opponent	Method	Event	Date	Round	Time	Location	Notes
Draw	0–0–1	Yoji Anjo	Draw	UWF U-Cosmos	November 29, 1989	5	3:00	Tokyo, Japan	
