= Payap Premchai =

Thai Muay Thai fighter

Payap
- Born: Thavorn Suppamart; December 15, 1958 (age 67); Bang Sue district, Bangkok, Thailand
- Nickname: "The Great Kicker from Bangsue" (จอมเตะบางซี่อ)
- Nationality: Thai
- Height: 179 cm (5 ft 10 in)
- Weight: 147 lb (67 kg; 10 st 7 lb)
- Style: Muay Thai; Muay Tae
- Stance: Southpaw
- Fighting out of: Bangkok, Thailand
- Team: Premchai

Payap Premchai (Thai: พายัพ เปรมชัย); is a retired Thai Muay Thai fighter.

== Biography and career ==
Payap started training in Muay Thai at the age of 14 and had about 40 fights in various provinces before making his debut at the Lumpinee Stadium in 1975.

In the late 1970s Payap emerged as a top fighter of the Bangkok circuit with an incredibly powerful left kick. in 1979 he defeated a first legend in Pudpadnoi Worawut, he then became the most dominant fighter of Thailand in the higher weights in the early 1980s.
During his career he captured the Rajadamnern Stadium 147 lbs in 1986 and defeated notable fighters of his era such as Sagat Petchyindee, Lakchart Sor.Prasatporn, Posai Sitiboonlert, Somsong Kiathoranee, Krongsak Sakkasem or Samart Prasarnmit.

On November 28, 1981 Payap faced Tetsuya Sakiyama at a WKA event in Hong Kong. The back and forth battle was judged a draw after five rounds.

On January 12, 1984 Payap faced reigning WKA World champion Rob Kaman in Amsterdam, Netherlands. He lost the fight by decision.

On August 8, 1986 Payap took part in a 4-man tournament for the Queen's Birthday event at Samrong stadium. In semifinal he defeated Khunpolnoi Sor.Thanongsak by decision and during the final he stopped Lakchart Sor.Prasatporn with kicks to the arms in the second round.

On November 24, 1986 Payap faced rival Tesuya Sakiyama for the fifth ad last time at a MAJKF in Tokyo, Japan. He won the fight by majority decision.

On August 13, 1988 Payap traveled to Japan to face the reigning Shootboxing champion Takeshi Caesar at UWF "The Professional Bout". He lost the fight by knockout due to a middle kick in the first round.

== Titles and accomplishments ==
- Rajadamnern Stadium
  - 1986 Rajadamnern Stadium Welterweight (147 lbs) Champion

Awards

- 1986 Fighter Magazine Fighter of the Year

== Muay Thai record ==
Muay Thai Record (incomplete)
Date	Result	Opponent	Event	Location	Method	Round	Time
2000	Loss	(Italy) David Ismalone	Rajadamnern Stadium	Bangkok, Thailand	Decision	5	3:00
For a 1 million baht side-bet.
1988-08-13	Loss	(Japan) Takeshi Caesar	UWF "The Professional Bout"	Tokyo, Japan	KO (Body kick)	1	2:36
1988-	Loss	(Thailand) Changpuek Kiatsongrit	Lumpinee Stadium	Bangkok, Thailand	KO (Low kicks)	1	
1987-	Loss	(Thailand) Krongsak Sakkasem		Sakon Nakhon, Thailand	Ref. stop. (lack of combativity)	4	
1987-	Win	(Thailand) Samart Prasarnmit		Thailand	Decision	5	3:00
1987-05-31	Loss	(Netherlands) Rob Kaman		Amsterdam, Netherlands	KO (Left hook to the body)	5	
1987-04-24	Loss	(Thailand) Changpuek Kiatsongrit	Rangsit Stadium	Bangkok, Thailand	DQ (threw a kick)	4	
Handicap match. Payap was not allowed to kick.
1987-	Win	(Thailand) Samart Prasarnmit		Thailand	Decision	5	3:00
1986-11-24	Win	(Japan) Tetsuya Sakiyama	MAJKF "Samurai-tachi no Utage"	Tokyo, Japan	Decision (Majority)	5	3:00
1986-09-28	Win	(Thailand) Saengprateep Sitsuchon	Muay Thai 7 see	Bangkok, Thailand	Decision	5	3:00
1986-08-08	Win	(Thailand) Lakchart Sor.Prasartporn	Queen’s Birthday, Rangsit Stadium Tournament Final	Rangsit, Thailand	TKO (arm injury/kicks)	2	
1986-08-08	Win	(Thailand) Khunpolnoi Sor.Thanongsak	Queen’s Birthday, Rangsit Stadium Tournament Semi Final	Rangsit, Thailand	Decision	3	3:00
1986-	Loss	(Thailand) Samart Prasarnmit	Rangsit Stadium	Thailand	Decision	5	3:00
1986-05-23	Win	(Thailand) Lakchart Sor.Prasartporn (Thailand) Ekaphon Songdej	2 vs 1 Samrong Stadium	Samut Prakan, Thailand	Decision	6	3:00
Handicap match. Lakchart fought the first three rounds and Ekaphon the next three.
1986-	Win	(Thailand) Krongsak Sakkasem		Si Saket, Thailand	Ref. stop. (lack of combativity)	3	
1986-	Win	(Thailand) Lakchart Sor.Prasartporn	Samrong Stadium	Samut Prakan, Thailand	Decision	5	3:00
Wins Rajadamnern Stadium 147 lbs title.
1986-	Win	(Thailand) Saensatharn Saengrit	Rangsit Stadium	Rangsit, Thailand	TKO (arm injury/Kicks)	4	
1985-11-	Loss	(Thailand) Samart Prasarnmit		Thailand	Decision	5	3:00
1985-08-08	Win	(Thailand) Fahdaeng Sor.Service	Rajadamnern Stadium	Bangkok, Thailand	TKO	5	
1984-10-18	Win	(Thailand) Fahdaeng Sor.Service	Khon Kaen Boxing Stadium	Khon Kaen province, Thailand	Decision	5	3:00
1984-09-26	Win	(Thailand) Ekaphon Songdej	Rajadamnern Stadium	Bangkok, Thailand	Decision	5	3:00
1984-	Win	(Netherlands) Robert Davis	WKA	Hong Kong	Decision	5	3:00
1984-01-12	Loss	(Netherlands) Rob Kaman		Amsterdam, Netherlands	Decision (Unanimous)	5	3:00
1983-11-12	Win	(Thailand) Somsong Kiathoranee		Ubon Ratchathani province, Thailand	Decision	5	3:00
1983-09-23	Win	(Netherlands) Peter Van Os	1er Championnat d'Europe de Boxe Thailandaise	Paris, France	TKO (Middle kicks)	3	
1983-04-24	Win	(Japan) Tetsuya Sakiyama		Bangkok, Thailand	KO	3	
1982-12-05	Win	(Thailand) Phetsiam Phetcharoen	Muay Thai 7 see	Bangkok, Thailand	KO	3	
1982-07-31	Win	(Japan) Tetsuya Sakiyama	WKA, Queen Elizabeth Stadium	Hong Kong	KO (High kick)	5	
1982-	Win	(Thailand) Somsong Kiathoranee		Phrae province, Thailand	Decision	5	3:00
1982-04-16	Win	(Thailand) Ruengrit Katathong	Lumpinee Stadium	Bangkok, Thailand	Decision	5	3:00
1982-02-09	Win	(Japan) Tetsuya Sakiyama	WKA, Queen Elizabeth Stadium	Hong Kong	TKO (Doctor stoppage/cut)	2	
1982-01-03	Win	(Australia) Michael Spink	International Free-style Kickboxing Championship	Hong Kong	Decision	3	3:00
1981-12-04	Win	(Thailand) Somsong Kiathoranee		Thailand	Decision	5	3:00
1981-11-28	Draw	(Japan) Tetsuya Sakiyama	WKA	Hong Kong	Decision	5	3:00
1981-	Win	(Thailand) Posai Sitiboonlert		Phrae province, Thailand	Decision	5	3:00
1981-	Win	(Thailand) Petchsiam		Bangkok, Thailand	TKO	3	
1981-	Win	(Thailand) Lakchart Sor.Prasatporn		Thailand	TKO	5	
1981-06-03	Loss	(Thailand) Lakchart Sor.Prasatporn	Rajadamnern Stadium	Bangkok, Thailand	Decision	5	3:00
1981-	Win	(Thailand) Densiam Hor.Mahachai		Bangkok, Thailand	TKO (arm injury/Kicks)	5	
1980-11-27	Loss	(Thailand) Yousop Sor.Thanikul	Rajadamnern Stadium	Bangkok, Thailand	Decision	5	3:00
1980-	Loss	(Thailand) Lakchart Sor.Prasatporn		Bangkok, Thailand	Decision	5	3:00
1980-07-03	Loss	(Thailand) Tawanook Penmongkol	Rajadamnern Stadium	Bangkok, Thailand	Decision	5	3:00
1980-	Win	(Thailand) Siprae Kiatsompop		Bangkok, Thailand	Decision	5	3:00
1980-04-28	Draw	(Thailand) Seksan Sor.Thepittak	Rajadamnern Stadium	Bangkok, Thailand	Decision	5	3:00
1980-04-09	Win	(Japan) Isamu Ozaki	Rajadamnern Stadium	Bangkok, Thailand	TKO (Knees to the body)	2	
1980-03-05	Loss	(Thailand) Yousop Sor.Thanikul	Rajadamnern Stadium	Bangkok, Thailand	Decision	5	3:00
1980-01-22	Win	(Thailand) Sagat Petchyindee	Lumpinee Stadium	Bangkok, Thailand	Decision	5	3:00
1979-10-09	Win	(Thailand) Banlainoi Fairtex	Lumpinee Stadium	Bangkok, Thailand	Decision	5	3:00
1979-08-31	Win	(Thailand) Pudpadnoi Worawut		Bangkok, Thailand	Decision	5	3:00
1979-07-03	Win	(Thailand) Fahkaew Fairtex	Lumpinee Stadium	Bangkok, Thailand	TKO	4	
1978-12-29	Loss	(Thailand) Kraikorn Singchakrawat	Lumpinee Stadium	Bangkok, Thailand	Decision	5	3:00
1978-	Win	(Thailand) Santisuk Srisothorn		Bangkok, Thailand	KO	3	
1978-	Win	(Thailand) Priyadej Lukthai		Bangkok, Thailand	Decision	5	3:00
1978-	Win	(Thailand) Pradermchai Barmos		Bangkok, Thailand	Decision	5	3:00
	Win	(Thailand) Thong Sor.Jiamudom	Rajadamnern Stadium	Bangkok, Thailand	KO	3	
Bangkok debut.
Legend: Win Loss Draw/No contest Notes

== See more ==
- List of Muay Thai practitioners
