= Yoji Anjo =

Japanese professional wrestler and mixed martial arts fighter

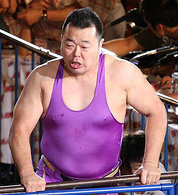
- Anjo in 2008
- Born: March 28, 1967 (age 59); Tokyo, Japan
- Other names: Mr. 200%
- Height: 1.80 m (5 ft 11 in)
- Weight: 90 kg (198 lb)
- Division: Light Heavyweight
- Style: Wrestling
- Team: Team Kingdom
- Teachers: Yoshiaki Fujiwara; Nobuhiko Takada; Akira Maeda
- Years active: 1985–2015

Mixed martial arts record
- Total: 6
- Wins: 0
- Losses: 5
- By knockout: 1
- By submission: 3
- By decision: 1
- Draws: 1

Other information
- Mixed martial arts record from Sherdog

Yoji Anjo (Japanese: 安生 洋二, Anjō Yōji) (born March 28, 1967) is a retired Japanese professional wrestler, mixed martial artist and kickboxer. Anjo is considered to be one of the pioneers of the shoot style movement during the 1980s and early 90s.

== Professional wrestling career ==
=== Universal Wrestling Federation and New Japan Pro-Wrestling (1985–1988) ===
A former practitioner of judo, sumo and muay thai, Anjo tried professional wrestling after meeting Nobuhiko Takada. He passed the original Universal Wrestling Federation's entrance tests and had his debut on July 6, 1985, against Osamu Hoshina. He only wrestled a handful of matches for the company, as it collapsed later in the year and its roster moved back to New Japan Pro-Wrestling, where Anjo debuted as a low-ranking member of the UWF "invading" army. Often teaming with fellow shooter Tatsuo Nakano, he feuded with names like Akira Nogami, Osamu Matsuda and Masakatsu Funaki as part of the NJPW junior heavyweight division. He eventually left the company in 1988 following Takada, Akira Maeda and the rest of his crew to form the second incarnation of UWF.

=== UWF Newborn (1988–1990) ===
In 1988, already in UWF Newborn, Anjo climbed up the card and adopted a more eccentric image for himself, wearing zebra tights and bondage gear and using heelish sneaky tactics in the ring. He participated in a different style fight at the U-COSMOS event against Changpuek Kiatsongrit, and also wrestled Holland exponent Dick Vrij. Just before the promotion disintegrated into several companies, Anjo got a high level victory against Minoru Suzuki.

=== Union of Wrestling Forces International (1991–1996) ===
In 1991 he joined UWF International, following his mentor Takada, and had success as the top native heel. He feuded with Takada and Kazuo Yamazaki, and had also an humbling match with The Iron Sheik.

In December 1994, Anjo was involved in a famous incident with Brazilian jiu-jitsu master Rickson Gracie. After Gracie declined to work with UWF International, Yoji travelled to California along with executive Shinji Sasazaki and a huge Japanese press contingent to perform a dojo challenge on Rickson. However, he lost the subsequent fight, with Rickson dominating him with brutal ground and pound and choking him out after the Japanese refused to give up.

With the UWFi's formerly fearsome reputation in tatters, the bookers had the idea of co-promoting events with NJPW in 1995, and Yoji earned a victory over Masahiro Chono in an interpromotional match. He and young wrestlers Yoshihiro Takayama and Kenichi Yamamoto formed a stable called the "Golden Cups" (a reference to pop rock band The Golden Cups) to feud in tag team and six-man matches against Super Strong Machine as the masked "200% Machines". They also forayed into WAR to feud with Genichiro Tenryu and others.

On August 17, 1996, Takada defeated Yoji Anjo at Tokyo's Meiji-Jingu Stadium. Despite the effort, UWF's attendance numbers swiftly decreased, with the federation closing its doors once and for all in December 1996. In their final show it was Kazushi Sakuraba who at long last headlined, defeating Anjo by submission. Following UWFI's collapse he joined Kingdom but then wandered into independent promotions and also began competing in MMA matches.

=== All Japan Pro Wrestling (2000–2003) ===
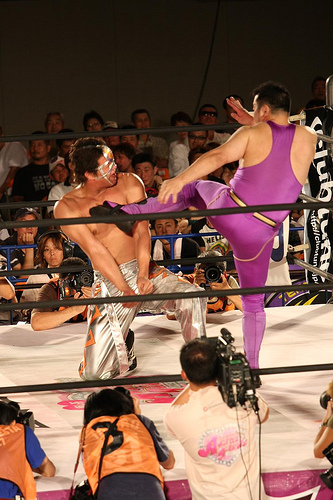
Anjo kicking Nagao Ginga.

In 2000 Anjo returned to professional wrestling to help out All Japan Pro Wrestling's rebuilding. He appeared as a partner to old foe Genichiro Tenryu, winning the World Tag Team Championship from Johnny Smith and Taiyo Kea. They retained the titles for a long times, including a double title match with AJPW All Asia Tag Team Champions Arashi and Koki Kitahara, against the teams of George Hines and Johnny Smith and Toshiaki Kawada and Nobutaka Araya, coming victorious after Anjo pinned Araya with a knee strike. After some weeks, Tenryu and Anjo finally lost the title to Keiji Mutoh and Taiyo Kea, dissolving the team.

After some single ventures and a failed team with Mitsuya Nagai, he quit All Japan and wandered again, joining Fighting World of Japan Pro Wrestling. He fought again alongside Tenryu, feuding with Takao Omori, and also teamed up with Ichiro Yaguchi to take part in the WMG Tag Team Championship tournament, but they were eliminated by Jinsei Shinzaki and Shiro Koshinaka.

=== Hustle (2004–2009) ===
After many months of inactivity, Anjo resurfaced in the sports entertainment promotion Hustle run by old comrade Takada. He debuted as Commander An Jo, Generalissimo Takada's right hand, wearing military uniforms and ornated eye masks.

On March 19, 2015, Anjo retired from professional wrestling, putting on a small interpromotional card called Y.A. is Dead (a reference to his entrance song James Brown Is Dead by LA Style) where he reformed his "Golden Cups" stable with Takayama and Yamamoto, to take on former UWF and New Japan foes Masakatsu Funaki, Minoru Suzuki and Sanae Kikuta in a best-of-three-falls six-man match. Anjo was forced to submit by Funaki in two straight falls, but Anjo demanded the match go to a third fall and was pinned by Suzuki.

== Mixed martial arts career ==
=== First bouts ===
Yoji's first shootfight was in UWF Newborn, after offering himself to fight muay thai champion Changpuek Kiatsongrit in the 1989 event U-Cosmos. Under mixed rules, Changpuek chose to wear gloves while Anjo did not. Started the fight, Yoji immediately clinched Changpuek to avoid his striking and repeatedly tried to take him down, but the Thai fighter kept holding the ring ropes in order to avoid it. After rounds, they traded kicks and Yoji cornered him in the turnbuckle several times, with Kiatsongrit never releasing the ropes. The Japanese wrestler managed to threaten him with submissions at the final round, but he couldn't lock them due to the rope escape rule, so the fight ended in a draw.

In January 1996 he had a mixed rules fight against kickboxer Manson Gibson. The bout had originally been slated to be fought under vale tudo, but Manson demanded at last minute UWF rules, more favorable to him. The first half had Anjo repeatedly taking the kickboxer down, only for Gibson to grab the ropes and capitalize on the limitless rope escapes to avoid the submissions. The second half saw Gibson sprawling an exhausted Anjo and holding him down for long minutes until being broken up by the referee, ending with Anjo landing another takedown before the ring bell.

Anjo had his official MMA debut at U-Japan, facing famed American grappler Sean Alvarez in a half-hour losing effort. Anjo landed the first takedown and hit Alvarez with headbutts, opening a cut in the American's face. When Anjo attempted to heel hook, Alvarez capitalized on the chance to sweep him and reverse positions, but Anjo eventually regained top position and continued headbutting him. Alvarez escaped and took his back, to which Anjo grabbed the cage to remain standing, a legal move under the ruleset. However, Alvarez eventually took him down and worked until taking his back again, landing punches for the tap out.

=== Ultimate Fighting Championship ===
In 1997, he took part in Ultimate Fighting Championship's UFC Japan tournament representing Kingdom along with Kazushi Sakuraba, and was pitted against the much bigger and experienced David "Tank" Abbott. The American took advantage of his own wrestling superiority to take Anjo down repeatedly and use ground and pound, while Yoji answered with multiple submission attempts and leg kicks whenever he could. At the end of the fight, judges gave the decision to Abbot for keeping control during the fight. However, he had got a hand injury and had to retire from the tournament. Anjo's partner Sakuraba ended winning the tournament instead.

At the second UFC event in Japan, UFC 25, Anjo fought an even more dangerous grappler, Murilo Bustamante, considered one of the best in the world. The Japanese wrestler was immediately taken down and mounted, but he managed to perform a rolling reversal off the cage and fend off an armbar attempt, and for a time seemed to have secured a guillotine choke, but only briefly. At the second round, Anjo was taken down and submitted with an arm triangle choke. Anjo kept facing high level opponents in the form of Olympic wrestler Matt Lindland, in UFC 29. This time was Anjo the first in initiating the takedown, but Lindland used the fence to avoid it and maneuver to mount, from where he executed intense ground and pound until the referee stopped the fight.

=== PRIDE ===
Three years after getting a draw with Seikendo fighter Gia Chirragishvili in Deep, Anjo was invited to Pride Fighting Championships to fight Ryan Gracie, in remembrance of Anjo's past challenge to Rickson. The young Brazilian took Anjo down, but couldn't get the choke, and even shoved the referee away after the restart, earning a yellow card. Again Ryan got a takedown and gained half guard, taking Anjo's back, but Yoji defended it and they struggled for position until he fell in an armbar and had to tap out. This was Anjo's last MMA fight, although he still helped to train fighters like Daiju Takase and Kenichi Yamamoto.

== Championships and accomplishments ==
- All Japan Pro Wrestling
  World Tag Team Championship (1 time) with Genichiro Tenryu
- Wrestling Association R

- WAR World Six-Man Tag Team Championship (2 times) with Yoshihiro Takayama and Kenichi Yamamoto; with Hiromichi Fuyuki and Bam Bam Bigelow

- Tokyo Pro Wrestling (1994–1996)

- TWA Tag Team Championship (2 times) - with Takashi Ishikawa (1) and Original Tiger Mask (1)

- Tokyo Sports

- Technique Award (1995)

== Mixed martial arts record ==
Professional record breakdown
6 matches	0 wins	5 losses
By knockout	0	1
By submission	0	3
By decision	0	1
Draws	1	

Res.	Record	Opponent	Method	Event	Date	Round	Time	Location	Notes
Loss	0–5–1	Ryan Gracie	Submission (armbar)	Pride Shockwave 2004	December 31, 2004	1	8:33	Saitama, Japan	
Draw	0–4–1	Gia Chirragishvili	Draw	Deep - 1st Impact	January 8, 2001	3	5:00	Nagoya, Japan	
Loss	0–4	Matt Lindland	TKO (strikes)	UFC 29	December 16, 2000	1	2:58	Tokyo, Japan	
Loss	0–3	Murilo Bustamante	Submission (arm triangle choke)	UFC 25	April 14, 2000	2	0:31	Tokyo, Japan	
Loss	0–2	David Abbott	Decision	UFC Japan	December 21, 1997	1	15:00	Yokohama, Japan	
Loss	0–1	Sean Alvarez	Submission (punches)	U - Japan	November 17, 1996	1	34:26	Japan	

=== Mixed rules ===
Professional record breakdown
1 match	0 wins	0 losses
By knockout	0	0
By submission	0	0
By decision	0	0
Draws	1	

Res.	Record	Opponent	Method	Event	Date	Round	Time	Location	Notes
Draw	0–0–1	Changpuek Kiatsongrit	Draw	UWF U-Cosmos	November 29, 1989	5	3:00	Tokyo, Japan	

== Kickboxing record ==
Kickboxing record
1 win, 2 losses, 3 draws
Date	Result	Opponent	Event	Location	Method	Round	Time	Record
August 22, 1999	Loss	(Japan) Issei Nakai	K-1 Spirits 1999	Tokyo, Japan	KO (punch)	2	1:22	1–2–2
June 6, 1999	Win	(United States) Tommy Glanville	K-1 Survival 1999	Tokyo, Japan	KO (mid kick)	2	2:46	1–1–2
March 23, 1999	Draw	(United States) Duncan James	K-1 The Challenge 1999	Tokyo, Japan	Decision Draw	5	3:00	0–1–2
August 28, 1998	Loss	(Japan) Masaaki Satake	K-1 Japan Grand Prix '98	Tokyo, Japan	TKO (high kick)	2	1:02	0–1–1
January 27, 1996	Draw	(United States) Manson Gibson	Shoot boxing "Carnival Ground Zero Yokohama"	Tokyo, Japan	Decision Draw	1	20:00	0–0–1
Legend: Win Loss Draw/No contest
