= Rob Kaman =

Dutch martial artist (1960–2024)

- Born: Robert Diem Kaman; 5 June 1960; Amsterdam, Netherlands
- Died: 30 March 2024 (aged 63); Skopelos, Greece
- Other names: Mr. Low Kick; Hammerkick; The Dutchman; Windmill Fighter
- Height: 1.85 m (6 ft 1 in)
- Weight: 82 kg (181 lb; 12 st 13 lb)
- Division: Middleweight; Light heavyweight
- Style: Kickboxing; Muay Thai
- Fighting out of: Amsterdam, Netherlands
- Team: Mejiro Gym
- Trainer: Jan Plas
- Years active: 1978–1999

Kickboxing record
- Total: 112
- Wins: 97
- By knockout: 77
- Losses: 12
- By knockout: 4
- Draws: 1
- No contests: 2

Mixed martial arts record
- Total: 1
- Wins: 1
- By knockout: 1
- Last updated on: 9 September 2010

Robert Diem Kaman (5 June 1960 – 30 March 2024) was a Dutch nine-time kickboxing and Muay Thai world champion. He was often called "Mr. Low Kick" because of his feared low kicks which he used to set up his devastating offensive attacks.

== Biography ==
=== Early life ===
Rob Kaman was born in Amsterdam on 5 June 1960. In his early days, he played football for the AFC Ajax Youth Team. Kaman was a good player, but never liked team sports. At the age of 16, he became interested in martial arts and started training in the Indonesian style pencak silat with Ruud van Weldam. Two years later, he watched a fight of kickboxer Lucien Carbin, after which he started training in Muay Thai and kickboxing at Mejiro Gym, first under Carbin and then Jan Plas.

In 1980, Kaman became an A-class fighter in the Netherlands. He won most of his fights by K.O. The turning point for him was his fight with Blinky Rodriquez, the cousin of Benny Urquidez. Kaman knocked him out in the 2nd round with a low kick to the leg. That was his international breakthrough. From then on, Kaman started fighting in Thailand.

His first fight in Thailand was against Dennoi, a local champion. Kaman won by K.O. and was asked to fight Lakchart, a Thai champion, in Bangkok.

=== Winning world title ===
On 23 September 1983 he fought John Moncayo for the world title WKA of kickboxing. Kaman knocked him out in the 3rd round with a low kick and became the first European WKA world champion in kickboxing.

On 12 January 1984 he fought Payap Premchai, the champion of Thailand, in the Jaap Edenhal in Amsterdam and was declared the winner by unanimous decision.

In April 1984 he had a rematch with John Moncayo in Miami, Florida. This time he knocked Moncayo out with a punch in the 3rd round. At the end of that year he beat the great Thai fighter Samart Prasarnmit in Hong Kong as well as Jean Marc Tonus for the European title of full contact.

During the year 1985, he beat Larry McFadden in the 3rd round by a knockout and three months later he took his revenge on Lakchart. He knocked Lakchart out in the 4th round.

After that, Kaman fought many different fighters in Amsterdam: Ernest Simmons (WKA rules), Ernesto Hoost (WKA rules), Payap (rematch on Muay Thai rules), Roger Hurd (WKA rules) and Sittisak (Muay Thai rules). He won them all and at the end of 1987 the Japanese asked him to come fight in Japan.

His first fight in Japan was against Lakchart. Kaman knocked Lakchart out in the 1st round. From then on he fought many times in Japan. He fought against Kirkwood Walker, Hansu Premchai, Santiago Garza, and Don Nakaya Nielsen.

On 9 April 1989, Kaman fought in the Netherlands again against Jan Wessels from Arnhem. Kaman also organized that event and did not have the time to prepare properly for the fight. He lost the fight and many people thought that his career was over. At the end of the year, he came back and beat Wessels by knock out in the 2nd round for a WKA world title.

In 1989 Kaman played in the movie Bloodfist with Don Wilson and Billy Blanks and fought three times against Changpuek Kiatsongrit from Thailand and Eddy Matthieu from France. During the summer he had a fight in Japan against Peter Smit. Smit was a newcomer and a WKA European champion. Kaman became a father with the birth of his son Gaby just before the fight. Rob lost his world title.

Kaman came back again. He fought against the Japanese fighter Yoshinori Nishi in Japan and won by 1st round knock out. The promoters in the Netherlands matched him a super fight with the new upcoming fighter Ernesto Hoost. This fight was in Amsterdam in a sold out Jaap Edenhal in 1990. Before the fight Hoost was the favorite but Kaman managed to knock him out in the 5th round. The fight "Ernesto Hoost vs. Rob Kaman 2" was the second time that Kaman won. Most fans and experts consider the second fight between mister perfect and mister low kick one of the best kickbox fights ever.

On 29 June 1991, Kaman fought against Luc Verheye in France for the world WKA title. Luc Verheye had beaten Peter Smit and was the new world champion. Kaman beat Luc Verheye and took the title back.

Kaman fought in France against fighters such as Rick Roufus, Mark Russell, Justin Ward, and Zito Polyo. One of Kaman's best fights was against Marek Piotrowski, whom he beat by K.O. in the 7th round.

On 25 January 1992, Kaman challenged his first professional MMA bout in RINGS against Nobuaki Kakuda. He won by TKO with a knee shot to grounded opponent in 3rd round.

On 20 June, Rob fought "the fight of the fights" against Jean-Yves Thériault. Rob won the fight by TKO and became the new ISKA world champion. He was at the same time world champion in WKA kickboxing and world champion in Muay Thai.

On 26 November 1993 Rob fought against another great Dutch champion Rick V.D. Vathorst. Kaman knocked him out in the 2nd round.

After that he fought again in France, this time in Marseille, again against a newcomer from the Netherlands, Orlando Breinburg. He won by TKO in the 3rd round.

In 1995 he participated in the K-2 tournament in Paris, France. His first fight was against Lavelle Robinson and he won by KO. In his second fight, he fought the Australian Tosca Petridis and was the winner again. In the finals, after two fights that night, he went against Jerome Turcan from France. Rob had numerous injuries from his previous fights. During round four, he was bleeding heavily but knocked Turcan out with two high kicks at the end of the round. After all his world titles, he also won the K-2 tournament in Paris, France.

After only a few fights in the later years, because of too many injuries and a new movie with Jean-Claude Van Damme (Legionnaire), Rob decided to end his career, back where it all started, in the Netherlands. On 2 September 1999 Rob married film writer artist Carlotta Torchia, and five weeks after, on 24 October 1999, he fought for the last time, against Alexey Ignashov, a 21-year-old amateur world champion in kickboxing. Rob won the fight by points, but after the fight he said that his opponent was the real winner and gave his trophy to Ignashov.

Kaman later trained UFC light heavyweight Brandon Vera on kickboxing for MMA. He also trained MMA fighter Jason Miller.

=== Acting career ===
Towards the end of his sports career, Kaman tried his hand at acting, playing in three movies with Jean-Claude Van Damme, Legionnaire, Maximum Risk and Double Team with Dennis Rodman and Mickey Rourke. In 1993, Nikko Toshogu Press produced 8 videotapes on Muay Thai training with him and one videotape with highlights and knock outs of his career.

=== Prison sentence ===
In 1985, Kaman was sentenced to 18 months in prison for robbing a bank in Eindhoven on 28 May of the same year. Police arrested Kaman and a 22-year-old accomplice in Best, only 29 minutes after the robbery. The two carried out the robbery armed and masked and looted 9000 Dutch guilders.

=== Death ===
Kaman died on 30 March 2024, at the age of 63 from a blood clot.

== Titles ==
- I.K.B.F. Full Contact Light Heavyweight World Champion
- 1980 Prestige Fight Dutch Title
- 1983 Muay Thai Middleweight European Champion
- 1983-87 W.K.A. Full Contact Middleweight World Champion
- 1984 P.K.A. Full Contact Middleweight European Champion
- 1988-89 W.K.A. Full Contact Light Heavyweight World Champion
- 1989-90 W.K.A. Full Contact Light Heavyweight World Champion
- 1990 I.M.T.F. Muay Thai Light Heavyweight World Champion
- 1991 W.K.A. Full Contact Light Heavyweight World Champion
- 1992 W.K.A. Full Contact Super Light Heavyweight World Champion
- 1992 I.S.K.A. Full Contact Super Middleweight World Champion
- 1992-94 I.S.K.A. Oriental Rules Light Heavyweight World Champion
- 1995 Kickboxing Mania Thai Boxe World Champion
- 1995 K-2 France Grand Prix '95 Champion

== Fight record ==
Kickboxing Record
97 wins (77 (T)KOs, 28 Decisions), 12 Losses, 1 Draw, 2 No Contests
Date	Result	Opponent	Event	Location	Method	Round	Time
1999-10-24	Win	(Belarus) Alexey Ignashov	It's Showtime - It's Showtime	Haarlem, Netherlands	Decision	5	3:00
1996-12-08	Loss	(United States) Jean-Claude Leuyer	K-1 Hercules '96	Nagoya, Japan	KO (Left mid kick)	5	0:43
1995-02-18	Win	(Thailand) Bunshima Roong	Kickboxing Mania III	Milan, Italy	KO (Elbow)	2	0:43
1995-06-24	NC	(Greece) Tosca Petridis		Paris, France	No Contest (head clash)	4	
1995-01-07	Win	(France) Jerome Turcan	K-2 France Grand Prix '95 Final	Paris, France	Ext.R KO (High Kick)	4	
Wins K-2 France Grand Prix '95.
1995-01-07	Win	(Greece) Tosca Petridis	K-2 France Grand Prix '95 Semi Finals	Paris, France	Decision	3	3:00
1995-01-07	Win	(United States) Lavelle Robinson	K-2 France Grand Prix '95 Quarter Finals	Paris, France	KO (Low Kick)	1	2:35
1994-11-12	Win	(Netherlands) Orlando Breinburg	Thriller in Marseille	Marseille, France	TKO	3	
1994-06-25	Win	(France) Jerome Turcan		Paris, France	KO (Low Kicks)		
Retains I.S.K.A. Oriental Rules Light Heavyweight World title.
1994-02-05	Loss	(United States) Rick Roufus		Paris, France	KO (Left Hook)	2	
Fight was for Roufus's I.S.K.A. Full Contact Light Heavyweight World title.
1993-12-29	Loss	(Thailand) Changpuek Kiatsongrit	K-2 Grand Prix '93 Quarter Finals	Tokyo, Japan	Decision (Unanimous)	3	3:00
1993-11-26	Win	(Netherlands) Rick van der Vathorst	Thaiboxing gala, Houtrusthallen	The Hague, Netherlands	KO (Right hook + Left mid kick)	2	
1993-06-05	Win	(Germany) Matthias Weitz		Paris, France	KO		
1992-12-11	Win	(Australia) Adam Watt		Tokyo, Japan	KO (Left Hook)	2	
1992-11-21	Win	(Poland) Marek Piotrowski		Paris, France	TKO (Right Cross)	7	
Wins vacant I.S.K.A. Oriental Rules Light Heavyweight World title.
1992-08-21	Draw	(Japan) Masaaki Satake	Rings Event "Ishizue"	Tokyo, Japan	Decision Draw	5	3:00
1992-06-20	Win	(Canada) Jean-Yves Thériault		Paris, France	TKO (Gave Up)	5	2:00
Wins Thériault's I.S.K.A. Full Contact Super Middleweight World title and retains W.K.A. Full Contact Light Heavyweight World title.
1992-04-26	Loss	(Thailand) Sadaw Kiatsongrit		Bangkok, Thailand	Decision	5	3:00
1992-04-06	Win	(Canada) Justin Ward		Paris, France	KO	2	
1992-03-26	Win	(Australia) Adam Watt	Kakutogi Symposium	Tokyo, Japan	KO		
1992-02-09	Win	(England) Mark Russell		Paris, France	KO (Right Cross)	2	
Wins W.K.A. Full Contact Super Light Heavyweight World title.
1992-01-07	Win	(United States) Lavelle Robinson		Paris, France	KO		
1991-12-20	NC	(United States) Rick Roufus	Les Choc Des Geants	Paris, France	No Contest (overturned)	12	2:00
For Roufus's I.S.K.A. Full Contact Light Heavyweight World title. Initially a Roufus decision win, the bout was later declared a no-contest after protest as only 1 minute had been fought in the 4th Round while Kaman had his opponent hurt.
1991-10-25	Win	(Bosnia and Herzegovina) Zijad Poljo	Thriller from Paris II	Paris, France	TKO (Corner stoppage/towel)	4	
1991-06-29	Win	(Netherlands) Luc Verheye	Thriller from Paris I	Paris, France	TKO (Doctor stoppage/eye injury)	5	1:36
Wins Verheye's W.K.A. Full Contact Light Heavyweight World title.
1990-11-18	Win	(Netherlands) Ernesto Hoost	The Battle of the Year	Amsterdam, Netherlands	KO (Left Hook)	5	
1990-09-28	Win	(Japan) Yoshinori Nishi	A.J.K.F Inspiring Wars "Heat-928"	Tokyo, Japan	KO (Right Hook)	1	1:51
1990-06-30	Loss	(Netherlands) Peter Smit	A.J.K.F Inspiring Wars "Heat-630"	Tokyo, Japan	KO (Punches)	10	
Loses W.K.A. Full Contact Light Heavyweight World title.
1990-05-27	Win	(France) Eddy Matthieu	Holland vs Thailand	Amsterdam, Netherlands	KO (Left Hook to the Body)	1	
Wins Matthieu's I.S.K.A. Full Contact Light Heavyweight World title.
1990-04-24	Loss	(Thailand) Changpuek Kiatsongrit	Holland Goes to Thailand, Lumpinee Stadium	Bangkok, Thailand	Decision	5	3:00
Loses I.M.T.F. Light Heavyweight World title.
1990-03-31	Win	(France) Dominique Siegler		Tokyo, Japan	KO (Left Hook)	1	
1990-02-18	Win	(Thailand) Changpuek Kiatsongrit	Holland vs Thailand 1990	Amsterdam, Netherlands	KO (Left Hook)	5	
Wins I.M.T.F. Light Heavyweight World title.
1989-12-31	Loss	(Thailand) Changpuek Kiatsongrit		Paris, France	Decision	5	3:00
1989-11-19	Win	(Netherlands) Jan Wessels	Kaman vs Wessels, Jaap Edenhal	Amsterdam, Netherlands	KO (Right Cross)	2	
Wins Wessel's W.K.A. Full Contact Light Heavyweight World title.
1989-10-21	Exhibition	(England) Samson Neguro	A.J.K.F Clash Of The Century, Part 5	Tokyo, Japan	KO	3	
1989-09-05	Win	(United States) Don Nakaya Nielsen	A.J.K.F Super Bout	Tokyo, Japan	KO (Right Hook)	3	
1989-04-09	Loss	(Netherlands) Jan Wessels		Netherlands	KO		
Loses W.K.A. Full Contact Light Heavyweight World title.
1988-11-25	Win	(Republic of Ireland) Sean O'Regan	A.J.K.F "Fighting The Great War 5"	Japan	KO (Left Hook)	2	
1988-10-25	Win	(United States) Ghalib Carmichael	A.J.K.F "Fighting The Great War 4"	Tokyo, Japan	KO (Right Low Kick)	3	
1988-07-16	Win	(United States) Santiago Garza	A.J.K.F "Fighting The Great War 3"	Japan	KO (Right Low Kick)	3	
Retains W.K.A. Full Contact Light Heavyweight World title.
1988-05-29	Win	(Thailand) Hansu Premchai	A.J.K.F "Fighting The Great War 2"	Japan	KO (Right Cross)	1	
1988-03-27	Win	(Thailand) Sittisak		Amsterdam, Netherlands	KO (right hook)	1	
1988-03-12	Win	(England) Kirkwood Walker	A.J.K.F "Fighting The Great War"	Japan	KO (Low Kicks and punches)	4	
Wins W.K.A. Full Contact Light Heavyweight World title.
1988-02-06	Loss	(Thailand) Krongsak Sakcharoenchai		Paris, France	Decision	5	3:00
For the vacant W.M.T.A World Super Middleweight title.
1987-11-15	Win	(Thailand) Lakchart Sor.Prasartporn	A.J.K.F "Super Fight 3"	Japan	KO (Body Straight)	1	0:30
1987-09-27	Win	(United States) Roger Hurd	W.K.A. Kickboxing	Amsterdam, Netherlands	KO (Right Low Kick)	1	
1987-05-31	Win	(Thailand) Payap Premchai		Amsterdam, Netherlands	KO (Left hook to the body)	5	
1987-02-01	Win	(Netherlands) Ernesto Hoost	W.K.A. Kickboxing	Amsterdam, Netherlands	Decision (Unanimous)	5	2:00
1986-10-12	Win	(United States) Ernest Simmons	W.K.A. Kickboxing	Amsterdam, Netherlands	TKO (Corner Stoppage/Low Kicks)	5	2:00
1985-05-12	Win	(Thailand) Lakchart Sor.Prasartporn	Kickboxing in Jaap Edenhal	Amsterdam, Netherlands	KO	4	
1985-02-03	Win	(United States) Larry McFadden	W.K.A. Kickboxing	Amsterdam, Netherlands	KO (Right Low Kick)	3	
Retains W.K.A. Full Contact Middleweight World title.
1984-12-30	Win	(Thailand) Samart Prasarnmit	WKA	Hong Kong	KO (Left hook to the body)	2	
1984-11-21	Win	(Switzerland) Jean Marc Tonus	P.K.A. Kickboxing	Geneva, Switzerland	Decision	11	
Wins P.K.A. Full Contact Middleweight European title.
1984-03-29	Win	(United States) John Moncayo	W.K.A. Kickboxing	Miami, Florida, United States	KO (Punch)	3	
Retains W.K.A. Full Contact Middleweight World title.
1984-01-12	Win	(Thailand) Payap Premchai	Jaap Edenhal	Amsterdam, Netherlands	Decision (Unanimous)	5	3:00
1983-09-23	Win	(United States) John Moncayo	W.K.A. Kickboxing	Amsterdam, Netherlands	KO (Low Kick)	3	
Wins Moncayo's W.K.A. Full Contact Middleweight World title.
1983-06-27	Win	(France) Christian Bafir	Elysee-Montmartre	Paris, France	Kom(punch)	1	
1983-01-23	Loss	(Thailand) Lakchart Sor.Prasatporn	Army Channel 7 Studio	Bangkok, Thailand	Decision	5	3:00
1982-10-23	Win	(Netherlands) Tuncay Coban	Jaap Edenhal	Amsterdam, Netherlands	KO		
Retains Dutch title.
1982-04-04	Win	(United States) Blinky Rodriquez	W.K.A. Kickboxing, Holland vs USA	Netherlands	KO (Low Kick)	2	
1982-02-01	Win	(Thailand) Dennoi Lerdrayong	Pattaya Boxing Stadium	Pattaya, Thailand	KO (Low Kick)	2	
1981-05-03	Win	(Japan) Takayuki Morimoto	Kickboxing, Holland vs Japan	Amsterdam, Netherlands	KO (Punches)	2	
1981-03-28	Win	(Switzerland) Jean Marc Tonus		Milan, Italy	KO (Punches)	4	
1981-01-18	Win	(Netherlands) Javi Muñiz	Apollohal	Amsterdam, Netherlands	Renunciation	3	
1980-09-28	Win	(Japan) Akira Saito	Kickboxing, Holland vs Japan	Amsterdam, Netherlands	KO	2	
1980-06-08	Win	(Italy) Baladelli	Prestige fight for vacant Dutch title	Amsterdam, Netherlands	KO	1	
1980-04-28	Win	(Netherlands) Serge Metz	Full-contact (5x2) Glazen Zaal Ahoy	Rotterdam, Netherlands	Decision	5	
1980-03-14	Win	(France) Emmanuel Essisima	Salle de Maubert Mutualite	Paris, France	Decision	5	
1980-02-10	Loss	(Netherlands) Faysal Karakus	Dutch titlefight	Amsterdam, Netherlands	Decision	5	
1979–1980	Loss	(Netherlands) Javi Muñiz		Unknown	KO		
1979-12-17	Win	(France) Madourgh	Glazen Zaal Ahoy	Rotterdam, Netherlands	decision	5	
1979-11-19	Win	(France) Luigi(?) Nicolf(i)	Hoeksteen	Amsterdam, Netherlands	Renunciation	1	
1979-04-23	Win	(France) Jean-Luc Legouez	Hoeksteen	Amsterdam, Netherlands			
1979-02-25	Win	(Netherlands) van Eunen	Hoeksteen	Amsterdam, Netherlands	C class fight		
1979-00-00	Draw	(Netherlands) Carlo Thuvis	De Enk	Rotterdam, Netherlands	Full Contact Decision	5x2	
1978-09-22	Loss	(France) Pierre Carillo	Stade Coubertin	Paris, France	Decision		
Legend: Win Loss Draw/No contest Notes

== Professional boxing record ==
1 fight	0 wins	0 losses
Draws	1	

No.	Result	Record	Opponent	Type	Round, time	Date	Location	Notes
1	Draw	0-0-1	(Netherlands) Rudi Koopmans	Decision	7 (7), 2:00	5 May 1988	Amsterdam, Netherlands	

== Mixed martial arts record ==
MMA Record
1 Win (1 (T)KOs), 0 Losses, 0 Draw
Date	Result	Opponent	Event	Location	Method	Round	Time
1992-01-25	Win	(Japan) Nobuaki Kakuda	Rings Battle Dimensions Tournament, Opening Round	Tokyo, Japan	TKO (Knee Drop)	3	2:03
Legend: Win Loss Draw/No contest Notes

== See also ==
- List of male kickboxers
