= Klaew Thanikhul =

Thai organized crime boss and Muay Thai promoter

Kleaw Thanikhul (Thai: แคล้ว ธนิกุล) (September 13, 1934 – April 5, 1991) was a Thai Chao pho (organized crime boss) and a Muay Thai promoter.

== Biography ==
=== Early life ===
Thanikhul was born on September 13, 1934 in Tambon Don Manora, Amphoe Bang Khonthi, Samut Songkhram Province. Thanikhul had a twin who was stillborn; his mother died giving birth. The meaning of the name "Kleaw" is literally "avoid (from various dangers)" or "being saved".

His father died when Thanikul was 7 or 8 years old, and Thanikhul was brought up by relatives.

=== Career ===
Later, he came to the Suan Mali neighborhood of Bangkok to live with his elder sister, where he made a reputation in the outlaw circle. He earned the aliases Laow Suan-Mali (เหลา สวนมะลิ) and Chao pho Nakhon Ban (เจ้าพ่อนครบาล, "god father of metropolitan"), with Chao pho ber nueng (เจ้าพ่อเบอร์หนึ่ง, "No.1 godfather"). He became a Muay Thai promoter and owner of the Muay Thai gym "Sor.Thanikhul" (ส.ธนิกุล). There were many famous Muay Thai kickboxers in this stable, including Dieselnoi Chor Thanasukarn, Inseenoi Sor.Thanikul, Bangkhlanoi Sor.Thanikul, Lom-Isan Sor.Thanikul, Sombat Sor.Thanikhul and Boonlai Sor.Thanikul. He was also the president of the Amateur Boxing Association of Thailand, and considered as the most influential figure in Thai boxing cycle in the 1980s.

Thanikhul was photographed on the cover of the magazine Muay Siam (มวยสยาม), a popular Muay Thai magazine of the era. The first issue was published in September 1986.

In the main event of "Suek Onesongchai" match between Chamuekpet Hapalang vs. Langsuan Panyuthaphum on the evening of March 4, 1988, at Lumpinee Stadium before the fifth round began Chaiwat "Ngow Haphalung" Phalungwattanakit, a Muay Thai gambler and Hapalang sponsor was shot dead by a lone hitman. No one knew for sure who did it, but everyone suspected that Klaew Thanikhul was the enforcer. At that time, if Thanikhul was the No.1 influential figure in Thai boxing cycle, Phalangwattanakit was considered No.2.

=== Murder and attempts ===
Thanikhul survived two attempts on his life: one in 1977 from a grenade thrown outside Rajadamnern Stadium, and another in 1982 from a grenade thrown inside Lumpinee Stadium. He was assassinated on Pinklao–Nakhon Chai Si Road in the area of Amphoe Sam Phran, Nakhon Pathom Province in the early evening of April 5, 1991, aged 56 years, along with an associate, Sakulyut Thongsaitharn. His killers were never caught.
