= Krongsak Sakkasem =

Thai former Muay Thai fighter and kickboxer

- Born: Prakong Boranrat; September 11, 1963 (age 63); Nong Ruea, Khon Kaen, Thailand
- Native name: ประคอง โบราณรัตน์
- Other names: Krongsak Na Theerawong (ครองศักดิ์ ณ ธีรวงศ์)
- Nickname: Temple Warrior (ครองศักดิ์); Young Man From Nong Ruea (ไอ้หนุ่มหนองเรือ); The Professor
- Height: 174 cm (5 ft 9 in)
- Division: Super Bantamweight; Featherweight; Super Featherweight; Lightweight; Super Lightweight; Welterweight; Super Welterweight
- Style: Muay Thai (Muay Khao)
- Stance: Southpaw
- Team: Sakkasem (1973-1985); Na Theerawong (1985-1987); Sakcharoenchai
- Years active: c. 1974–1995

Kickboxing record
- Total: 69
- Wins: 56
- By knockout: 12
- Losses: 13

Other information
- Occupation: Muay Thai trainer

Prakong Boranrat (Thai: ประคอง โบราณรัตน์; born September 11, 1963), known professionally as Krongsak Sakkasem (Thai: ครองศักดิ์ ศักดิ์เกษม) is a Thai former professional Muay Thai fighter and kickboxer.

== Biography and career ==
At the age of 10 Krongsak was sent to Bangkok where he studied to become a monk. There he discovered Muay Thai through friends and finally joined the Sakksaem muay thai camp at the age of 12. Two years later he made his debut at Rajadamnern Stadium.

During his career Krongsak became the number 1 ranked fighter at both Rajadamnern and Lumpinee stadiums but never was able to capture the titles. At the peak of his popularity his purses reached 100,000 baht. He holds wins over notable champions of his time: Sagat Petchyindee, Jitti Kiatsuriya, Inseenoi Sor Thanikul, Raktae Muangsurin, Samart Prasarnmit and Changpuek Kiatsongrit.

in 1985 Krongsak fought the legendary Dieselnoi Chor Thanasukarn. They would fight to a draw at Rajadamnern Stadium on August 8, a fight a lot of observers thought Krongsak should have won. Dieselnoi would beat him on points in the rematch on November 12 at Lumpinee Stadium. Both fights at 132 lbs.

In 1988 Krongsak moved to France where he began teaching at the Lamy Gym in Paris. He kept competing both in Muay Thai and Kickboxing rules in Europe. He went undefeated in his second career, capturing world titles against notable European champions of his era such as Ivan Hippolyte, Rob Kaman, Stéphane Nikiéma and Guillaume Kerner. Krongsak retired from fighting in 1995 and turned to coaching full time, he also organized events in France cooperation with Thai promotors. He has been living in France for over 30 years.

== Titles and accomplishments ==
- 2x Thailand Champion (1984 & 1985)
- World Muay Thai Association
  - 1988 WMTA World Super Middleweight (168 lbs) Champion
    - One successful title defense
  - 1992 WMTA World Super Welterweight (154 lbs) Champion
    - Five successful title defenses
- World Kickboxing Association
  - WKA World Super Welterweight (154 lbs) Champion
    - Two successful title defenses

Awards

- 1985 Sports Writers Association of Thailand Fight of the Year (Aug 8th vs. Dieselnoi Chor Thanasukarn)
- 1987 Fighter Magazine Fighter of the Year

== Fight record ==
Muay Thai Record
56 Wins (12(T)KO's),13 Loses, 2 Draw
Date	Result	Opponent	Event	Location	Method	Round	Time
1995-09-30	Win	(France) Guillaume Kerner		Évry, France	TKO (Doctor stoppage)	3	
Defends the Muay Thai World Super Welterweight (154 lbs) title.
1994-02-05	Win	(Germany) Mustapha Lakhcem	Sami Kebchi - Clash of the Titans Kickboxing Show	Paris, France	Decision	10	2:00
Defends the WKA World Super Welterweight (154 lbs) title.
1993-12-	Win	(France) Stéphane Nikiéma	Salle des Sports Marcel Cerdan	Levallois, France	Decision	5	3:00
Defends the ISKA Oriental rules World Super Welterweight (154 lbs) title.
1993-06-04	Win	(France) Stéphane Nikiéma	Stade Pierre de Coubertin	Paris, France	Decision (Unanimous)	5	3:00
Wins the ISKA Oriental rules World Super Welterweight (154 lbs) title.
1992-04-24	Win	(Netherlands) Antoine Druif		Hong Kong	KO	1	
1992-04-11	Win	(France) André Panza	7th Festival des Arts Martiaux	Paris, France	TKO (Punches)	9	
Defends the WKA World Super Welterweight (154 lbs) title.
1991-04-11	Win	(England) Liam Walsh		Paris, France	KO (Left Cross)	1	
Wins the WKA World Super Welterweight (154 lbs) title.
1991-	Draw	(Netherlands) Ivan Hippolyte		Amsterdam, Netherlands	Decision	5	3:00
1989-11-23	Win	(United States) Mike Cole	Lamy Gym présente Boxe-Thai I	Paris, France	TKO (Left Straight)	1	
1989-	Win	(France) Pascal Grégoire		Paris, France	KO	2	
1988-12-22	Win	(Netherlands) Ivan Hippolyte	Lamy Gym présente Boxe-Thai	Paris, France	Decision	5	3:00
Defends the WMTA World Super Middleweight (168 lbs) title.
1988-02-06	Win	(Netherlands) Rob Kaman		Paris, France	Decision	5	3:00
Wins the WMTA World Super Middleweight (168 lbs) title.
1987-10-30	Win	(Thailand) Changpuek Kiatsongrit		Bangkok, Thailand	KO	3	
1987-10-06	Win	(Thailand) Mapralong Sit Por Tor Thor		Mueang Sakon Nakhon, Thailand			
1987-	Win	(Thailand) Payap Premchai		Sakon Nakhon, Thailand	Ref. stop (lack of combativity)	4	
1987-03-06	Loss	(Thailand) Changpuek Kiatsongrit		Ubon Ratchathani province, Thailand	Decision	5	3:00
1986-	Win	(Thailand) Changpuek Kiatsongrit		Thailand	Decision	5	3:00
1986-	Win	(Thailand) Fahdaeng Sor.Borikan		Thailand			
1986-	Win	(Thailand) Seeyok		Thailand			
1986-	Loss	(Thailand) Payap Premchai		Si Saket, Thailand	Ref. stop (lack of combativity)	5	
1986-	Win	(Thailand) Jock Kiatniwat		Thailand			
1986-	Win	(Thailand) Sawainoi Daopaetrew		Thailand			
1986-05-17	Loss	(Thailand) Nokweed Devy		Bangkok, Thailand	Decision	5	3:00
1986-	Win	(Thailand) Fanta Attapong		Thailand			
1986-	Win	(Thailand) Samart Prasarnmit		Thailand	KO		
1986-	Win	(Netherlands) Antoine Druif		Clermont-Ferrand, France	TKO	3	
1986-	Win	(Netherlands) Orlando Wiet		France	Decision	5	3:00
1986-	Win	(Netherlands) Rick van der Vathorst		Paris, France			
1985-11-12	Loss	(Thailand) Dieselnoi Chor Thanasukarn	Lumpinee Stadium	Bangkok, Thailand	Decision	5	3:00
For the Yodmuaythai title.
1985-08-08	Draw	(Thailand) Dieselnoi Chor Thanasukarn	Rajadamnern Stadium	Bangkok, Thailand	Decision	5	3:00
1985-07-04	Win	(Thailand) Sawainoi Daopaetrew	Rajadamnern Stadium	Bangkok, Thailand	Decision	5	3:00
1985-04-	Loss	(Thailand) Mekong Sor Borikan	Rajadamnern Stadium	Bangkok, Thailand	Decision	5	3:00
1985-03-18	Win	(Thailand) Sagat Petchyindee	Rajadamnern Stadium	Bangkok, Thailand	Decision	5	3:00
1984-	Loss	(Thailand) Fanta Attapong		Bangkok, Thailand	Decision	5	3:00
1984-04-06	Win	(Thailand) Jomtrai Petchyindee		Nakhon Pathom, Thailand	Decision	5	3:00
1984-	Loss	(Thailand) Inseenoi Sor.Thanikul	Rajadamnern Stadium	Bangkok, Thailand	Decision	5	3:00
1984-01-05	Loss	(Thailand) Kaopong Sitichuchai	Rajadamnern Stadium	Bangkok, Thailand	Decision	5	3:00
1983-11-03	Win	(Thailand) Inseenoi Sor.Thanikul	Rajadamnern Stadium	Bangkok, Thailand	Decision	5	3:00
1983-08-29	Win	(Thailand) Raktae Muangsurin	Rajadamnern Stadium	Bangkok, Thailand	Decision	5	3:00
1982-	Win	(Thailand) Fadaeng Sor Borikan		Bangkok, Thailand	Decision	5	3:00
1982-09-15	Win	(Thailand) Inseenoi Sor.Thanikul	Rajadamnern Stadium	Bangkok, Thailand	Decision	5	3:00
1982-08-16	Win	(Thailand) Samart Prasarnmit	Rajadamnern Stadium	Bangkok, Thailand	KO	4	
1982-07-21	Win	(Thailand) Samart Prasarnmit	Rajadamnern Stadium	Bangkok, Thailand	Decision	5	3:00
1982-03-26	Win	(Thailand) Nakhonsawan Suanmisakwan	Lumpinee Stadium	Bangkok, Thailand	Decision	5	3:00
1982-02-24	Win	(Thailand) Samart Prasarnmit	Rajadamnern Stadium	Bangkok, Thailand	Decision	5	3:00
1982-01-27	Win	(Thailand) Lakchart Sor.Prasartporn	Rajadamnern Stadium	Bangkok, Thailand	Decision	5	3:00
1981-11-03	Loss	(Thailand) Ruengsak Petchyindee	Lumpinee Stadium	Bangkok, Thailand	KO (Punches)	1	
For the Lumpinee Stadium Super Featherweight (130 lbs) title.
1981-	Loss	(Thailand) Saeksan Sor.Thepittak	Rajadamnern Stadium	Bangkok, Thailand	Decision	5	3:00
1981-08-21	Win	(Thailand) Sagat Petchyindee	Lumpinee Stadium	Bangkok, Thailand	Decision	5	3:00
1981-	Win	(Thailand) Saeksan Sor.Thepittak	Lumpinee Stadium	Bangkok, Thailand	Decision	5	3:00
1981-	Loss	(Thailand) Kaopong Sitichuchai	Lumpinee Stadium	Bangkok, Thailand	Decision	5	3:00
1981-03-10	Win	(Thailand) Jitti Kiatsuriya	Lumpinee Stadium	Bangkok, Thailand	Decision	5	3:00
1981-	Win	(Thailand) Seeprae Fairtex	Lumpinee Stadium	Bangkok, Thailand	Decision	5	3:00
1981-01-08	Win	(Thailand) Seeprae Fairtex	Rajadamnern Stadium	Bangkok, Thailand	Decision	5	3:00
1980-11-25	Win	(Thailand) Sagat Petchyindee	Lumpinee Stadium	Bangkok, Thailand	Decision	5	3:00
1980-11-03	Win	(Thailand) Dennarong Saksandee	Rajadamnern Stadium	Bangkok, Thailand	Decision	5	3:00
1980-07-22	Loss	(Thailand) Lom-Isan Sor.Thanikul	Lumpinee Stadium	Bangkok, Thailand	KO (High Kick)	4	
For the Lumpinee Stadium Super Bantamweight (122 lbs) title.
1980-06-03	Win	(Thailand) Chintadet Sakniran	Lumpinee Stadium	Bangkok, Thailand	Decision	5	3:00
1980-02-09	Win	(Thailand) Attapee Boonroj	Lumpinee Stadium	Bangkok, Thailand	Decision	5	3:00
1980-01-21	Win	(Thailand) Fah-Uthai Phitsanurachan	Rajadamnern Stadium	Bangkok, Thailand	KO (Punches)	2	
	Win	(Thailand) Densuk Florida		Bangkok, Thailand	Decision	5	3:00
1979-09-07	Win	(Thailand) Kwangtongnoi Kiatsingnoi	Lumpinee Stadium	Bangkok, Thailand	Decision	5	3:00
1979-07-20	Win	(Thailand) Man Sor.Jitpattana	Lumpinee Stadium	Bangkok, Thailand	Decision	5	3:00
	Win	(Thailand) Yodkhunsuk Kiatsingnoi		Bangkok, Thailand	Decision	5	3:00
	Win	(Thailand) Samoechai Ketsongkran		Bangkok, Thailand	KO		
	Win	(Thailand) Win Kisaiphodeang		Bangkok, Thailand	Decision	5	3:00
	Win	(Thailand) Chalamsing Sakwichian		Bangkok, Thailand	Decision	5	3:00
	Win	(Thailand) Yodphon Phongsit		Bangkok, Thailand	Decision	5	3:00
	Win	(Thailand) Rungsai Kiatpetch		Bangkok, Thailand	Decision	5	3:00
	Win	(Thailand) Lap Or Yuthanakorn		Bangkok, Thailand	Decision	5	3:00
1978-04-07	Win	(Thailand) Ekasit Kor.Kerdphol	Lumpinee Stadium	Bangkok, Thailand	Decision	5	3:00
Legend: Win Loss Draw/No contest Notes

== See also ==
- List of male kickboxers
