= Peter Smit =

Dutch martial artist (1961–2005)

- Born: 24 December 1961; Dordrecht, Netherlands
- Died: 15 August 2005 (aged 43); Rotterdam, Netherlands
- Other names: The Hurricane
- Height: 1.89 m (6 ft 2 in)
- Division: Light Heavyweight
- Style: Kyokushin, Muay Thai, kickboxing
- Team: Budokai Vleesenbeek Gym

Kickboxing record
- Total: 26
- Wins: 17
- By knockout: 10
- Losses: 6
- Draws: 3

Peter "The Hurricane" Smit (24 December 1961 – 15 August 2005) was a Dutch martial artist who competed in kyokushin karate, kickboxing and Muay Thai.

== Biography ==
Smit started training in Kyokushin karate at 16 years old. In 1981 he debuted training in kickboxing. He fought his first international tournament, the Open Ocean Pacific Kyokushinkai championship, in 1985 in Hawaii. Smit got his nickname "The Hurricane" from a Dutch colleague Fred Royers by "becoming a champion like a hurricane" when he beat six opponents in a single day.

In 1986 he fought against Hiroki Kurosawa during the 18th Open Japanese Championships Kyokushinkai in Tokyo. Smit lost a debatable decision after three extra rounds. Smit trained with Michel Wedel in Japan, and the following year in the Netherlands in preparation for the European Championship. Peter Smit became European Middle weight champion Kyokushin in 1987 in Katowice, Poland.

In 1990 Smit became a Muay Thai world champion when knocked out Changpuek Kiatsongrit in the Lumpinee Stadium in Bangkok in front of his own public, the first time that had happened in the history of muay thai. After a flurry of punches and knees Changpuek was knocked out in the 2nd round.

His first fight against kickboxing legend Rob Kaman was also considered an upset. In the 10th round he won by knockout. It was the highlight of Peter Smit's short career.

He worked for Fighting Network Rings in Japan a cross MMA-Professional Wrestling promotion from 1991 to 1994.

Smit was attacked in a Rotterdam nightclub by two people. The scuffle ended up in the nightclub car park with Peter suffering a broken ankle. His attackers had tried to kill him attempting to run him down with their car. A cast was put on the broken ankle but Peter cut it off with a hacksaw and fought Rob Kaman neglecting the injury. The ankle injury never healed properly and he had to end his career early.

After the end of his career over Smit suffered from depression and became addicted to cocaine. He ran into trouble with the police committing thefts to support his addiction and ended up serving a 7-month sentence in jail in 2000. He rebuilt his life when he was released from jail, drug free, however, had he difficulties training due to the ankle injury.

On 15 August 2005, he was shot to death in Rotterdam, Netherlands.

== Fight record ==
Kickboxing record
17 wins (10 (T)KOs, 7 decisions), 6 losses, 3 draws
Date	Result	Opponent	Event	Location	Method	Round	Time
1991-05-26	Loss	(United States) Maurice Smith	AJKF "From Budokan-I Chapter III"	Chiyoda, Tokyo, Japan	KO	5	1:13
1991-04-14	Loss	(Netherlands) Luc Verheye		Dordrecht, Netherlands	TKO	8	
Loses WKA World Junior Light heavyweight title.
1990-11-27	Loss	(Thailand) Changpuek Kiatsongrit	Lumpinee Stadium	Bangkok, Thailand	Decision	5	3:00
Loses IMTF (IMF) World Light heavyweight title.
1990-10-28	Loss	(Netherlands) Luc Verheye		Dordrecht, Netherlands	KO (doctor stoppage)	2	
1990-08-31	Win	(Thailand) Changpuek Kiatsongrit	Lumpinee Stadium	Bangkok, Thailand	KO (punches)	2	
Wins IMTF (IMF) World Light heavyweight title.
1990-06-30	Win	(Netherlands) Rob Kaman	AJKF "Inspiring Wars "Heat630""	Chiyoda, Tokyo, Japan	KO (right cross)	10	2:10
Wins WKA World Junior Light heavyweight title.
1990-04-08	Win	(Netherlands) Leo de Snoo	The War	Rotterdam, Netherlands	Decision	10	
Wins Snoo's WKA European Light heavyweight title.
1989-12-17	Win	(Netherlands) Luc Verheye		Dordrecht, Netherlands	KO (right cross)	5	
1989-05-21	Win	(Greece) Kosta Patoulidis		Dordrecht, Netherlands	Decision	5	2:00
1989-01-29	Win	(Netherlands) Andre Mannaart	AJKF	Tokyo, Japan	Decision	5	3:00
1988-12-18	Loss	(Netherlands) Jan Wessels		Rotterdam, Netherlands	Decision	5	
1988-05-15	Win	(England) Robert Davis		Amsterdam, Netherlands	KO (punches)	4	
1988-04-14	Win	(Netherlands) Leo de Snoo		Eindhoven, Netherlands	Decision	5	
Legend: Win Loss Draw/no contest Notes

== Titles ==
- Ocean Pacific Champion Kyokushin Karate 1985
- 2x Dutch Champion Kyokushin Karate Light heavyweight 1985 and 1986
- Kyokushin Karate lightheavyweight European champion 1987
- WKA Kickboxing World Junior Lightheavyweight champion 1990
- Das Führer's Street Fighter champion 1990
- IMF World champion Muay Thai 1990
- WKA Lightheavyweight European Champion kickboxing 1990

== See also ==
- List of male kickboxers

Sporting positions
Preceded by Leo de Snoo	WKA Kickboxing European Light heavyweight champion 8 April 1990 - ?	Succeeded by ?
Preceded by Rob Kaman	WKA Kickboxing World Junior Light heavyweight champion 30 June 1990 – 7 April 1991	Succeeded by Luc Verheye
Preceded by ?	IMTF(IMF) World Light heavyweight champion 31 August 1990 – 27 November 1990	Succeeded by Changpuek Kiatsongrit
