= Inseenoi Sor.Thanikul =

Thai former professional Muay Thai fighter

- Born: Thawat Phimsap; September 16, 1958 (age 68); Tha Muang, Kanchanaburi, Thailand
- Native name: ธวัช พิมพ์ทรัพย์
- Other names: Inseenoi Luknongkaikhan (อินทรีน้อย ลูกหนองไก่ขัน)
- Nickname: Likay Tiger (พยัคฆ์ยี่เก)
- Division: Bantamweight; Super Bantamweight; Featherweight; Super Featherweight; Lightweight
- Style: Muay Thai
- Stance: Orthodox
- Team: Sor.Sawangthit; Sor.Thanikul

Thawat Phimsap (Thai: ธวัช พิมพ์ทรัพย์; September 16, 1958), known professionally as Inseenoi Sor.Thanikul (Thai: อินทรีน้อย ส.ธนิกุล), is a Thai former professional Muay Thai fighter. He is a former Rajadamnern Stadium Lightweight Champion who fought during the 1980s.

== Biography and career ==
Inseenoi grew up in Ban Pong District, Ratchaburi Province. He started training in Muay Thai in the Luknongkaikhan camp near his home as a child. After 10 bouts, Inseenoi moved to the Sor.Sawangthit camp in the Chonburi Province, but kept using the name Luknongkaikhan until he got he had the opportunity to compete in Bangkok for the first time at Rajadamnern Stadium. Inseenoi rose to fame through the promotion of Songchai Rattanasubban. He had the opportunity to fight for a championship for the first time in 1978 when he lost on points to Saknarongnoi Lukbangpakong for the Lumpinee Stadium Super bantamweight title.

When Inseenoi made his debut in Bangkok what caught the attention of fans was the distinctive makeup and attire he would wear before fighting inspired by Likay, earning him the nickname "The Likay Tiger."

Inseenoi joined the Sor.Thanikul camp in 1979, from there he fought many notable champions of his era including Ruengsak Porntawee, Padejsuk Pitsanurachan, Samart Prasarnmit and Krongsak Sakkasem. The most notable moment of his career happened on December 8, 1982, when he captured the Rajadamnern Stadium Lightweight title against Raktae Muangsurin. Inseenoi retired from competition at the end of 1987 and returned to the Chonburi province where he runs a family business selling pork in fruits.

== Titles and honours ==
- Rajadamnern Stadium
  - 1982 Rajadamnern Stadium Lightweight (135 lbs) Champion
    - One successful defense

== Fight record ==
Muay Thai Record
| Date | Result | Opponent | Event | Location | Method | Round | Time |
|---|---|---|---|---|---|---|---|
| 1987-12-22 | Loss | (Thailand) Saenchainoi Chomphuthong | | Udon Thani province, Thailand | Decision | 5 | 3:00 |
| 1987-09-24 | Loss | (Thailand) Sitthichia Lukborai | | Chanthaburi province, Thailand | Decision | 5 | 3:00 |
| 1987- | Loss | (Thailand) Mahesuan Sit-Amphon | | Thailand | Decision | 5 | 3:00 |
| 1987-03-15 | Loss | (Thailand) Phet Lukbansuan | Channel 7 Stadium | Bangkok, Thailand | Decision | 5 | 3:00 |
| 1987- | Loss | (Thailand) Chanwitnoi Sakwitaya | | Bangkok, Thailand | Decision | 5 | 3:00 |
| 1987- | Loss | (Thailand) Chakkaj Porntawee | | Bangkok, Thailand | Decision | 5 | 3:00 |
| 1987- | Draw | (Thailand) Phothai Chor.Waikul | | Bangkok, Thailand | Decision | 5 | 3:00 |
| 1984- | Win | (Thailand) Krongsak Sakkasem | Rajadamnern Stadium | Bangkok, Thailand | Decision | 5 | 3:00 |
| 1984-06-01 | Loss | (Thailand) Jomtrai Petchyindee | Nawamthong, Rajadamnern Stadium | Bangkok, Thailand | Decision (Unanimous) | 5 | 3:00 |
Loses the Rajadamnern Stadium Lightweight (135 lbs) title.
| 1984-05-03 | Win | (Thailand) Komtae Chor.Suananant | Rajadamnern Stadium | Bangkok, Thailand | Decision | 5 | 3:00 |
| 1984-02-09 | Loss | (Thailand) Mangkonkhiao Sitchang | Nawamthong, Rajadamnern Stadium | Bangkok, Thailand | Decision | 5 | 3:00 |
| 1983-12-08 | Loss | (Thailand) Kaopong Sitchuchai | | Bangkok, Thailand | Decision | 5 | 3:00 |
| 1983-11-03 | Loss | (Thailand) Krongsak Sakkasem | Rajadamnern Stadium | Bangkok, Thailand | Decision | 5 | 3:00 |
| 1983-10-10 | Win | (Thailand) Ruengsak Porntawee | Rajadamnern Stadium | Bangkok, Thailand | Decision | 5 | 3:00 |
| 1983-09-21 | Win | (Thailand) Padejsuk Pitsanurachan | Suadam, Rajadamnern Stadium | Bangkok, Thailand | Decision | 5 | 3:00 |
| 1983-08-04 | Win | (Thailand) Padejsuk Pitsanurachan | Rajadamnern Stadium | Bangkok, Thailand | Decision | 5 | 3:00 |
Defends the Rajadamnern Stadium Lightweight (135 lbs) title.
| 1983-06-10 | Loss | (Thailand) Ruengsak Porntawee | Petchyindee, Lumpinee Stadium | Bangkok, Thailand | Decision | 5 | 3:00 |
| 1983-04- | Win | (Thailand) Rakchai Haphalang | | Thailand | Decision | 5 | 3:00 |
| 1983-02-09 | Win | (Thailand) Nongkhai Sor.Prapatsorn | | Thailand | Decision | 5 | 3:00 |
| 1982-12-08 | Win | (Thailand) Raktae Muangsurin | Nawamthong, Rajadamnern Stadium | Bangkok, Thailand | Decision | 5 | 3:00 |
Wins the Rajadamnern Stadium Lightweight (135 lbs) title.
| 1982-11-19 | Win | (Thailand) Jomtrai Petchyindee | Rajadamnern Stadium | Bangkok, Thailand | Decision | 5 | 3:00 |
| 1982-10-27 | Draw | (Thailand) Samart Prasarnmit | Rajadamnern Stadium | Bangkok, Thailand | Decision | 5 | 3:00 |
| 1982-09-15 | Loss | (Thailand) Krongsak Sakkasem | Rajadamnern Stadium | Bangkok, Thailand | Decision | 5 | 3:00 |
| 1982-08-18 | Loss | (Thailand) Jitti Muangkhonkaen | Rajadamnern Stadium | Bangkok, Thailand | Decision | 5 | 3:00 |
| 1982-07-15 | Loss | (Thailand) Raktae Muangsurin | Rajadamnern Stadium | Bangkok, Thailand | Decision | 5 | 3:00 |
| 1982-06-03 | Win | (Thailand) Rakchai Lipowitan | | Thailand | Decision | 5 | 3:00 |
| 1982-05-08 | Win | (Thailand) Dechanan Sakpinyo | | Songkhla province, Thailand | Decision | 5 | 3:00 |
| 1982-04-29 | Win | (Thailand) Pornsak Sitchang | | Thailand | Decision | 5 | 3:00 |
| 1982-03-08 | Win | (Thailand) Prayuth Sakkaesem | | Thailand | Decision | 5 | 3:00 |
| 1982-01-20 | Win | (Thailand) Kittichai Sitsei | | Thailand | Decision | 5 | 3:00 |
| 1981-11-06 | Loss | (Thailand) Mahesuan Sit-Amphon | Hirario Zapata vs Netrnoi Sor.Vorasingh | Nakhon Ratchasima province, Thailand | Decision | 5 | 3:00 |
| 1981-06-08 | Win | (Thailand) Prayuth Sakkasem | Rajadamnern Stadium | Bangkok, Thailand | Decision | 5 | 3:00 |
| 1980-10-06 | Loss | (Thailand) Rotduan Saknamcharoen | Rajadamnern Stadium | Bangkok, Thailand | Decision | 5 | 3:00 |
| 1980-09-04 | Loss | (Thailand) Wandee Saknamcharoen | Nawamthong, Rajadamnern Stadium | Bangkok, Thailand | Decision | 5 | 3:00 |
| 1980-03-27 | Loss | (Thailand) Jomtrai Petchyindee | Phettongkham, Rajadamnern Stadium | Bangkok, Thailand | Decision | 5 | 3:00 |
| 1980-02-20 | Win | (Thailand) Fakkaew Fairtex | Phettongkham, Rajadamnern Stadium | Bangkok, Thailand | KO | 3 | |
| 1979-10-13 | | (Thailand) Fakkaew Fairtex | | Phetchabun province, Thailand | | | |
| 1979-09-01 | Draw | (Thailand) Danphrai Kiattiwayuphak | | Ubon Ratchathani province, Thailand | Decision | 5 | 3:00 |
| 1978-08-11 | Win | (Thailand) Fahsai Thaweechai | | Ubon Ratchathani province, Thailand | Decision | 5 | 3:00 |
| 1978-12-04 | Loss | (Thailand) Saipet Sakornpitak | Chao Tawanhok, Lumpinee Stadium | Bangkok, Thailand | Decision | 5 | 3:00 |
| 1978-11-03 | Loss | (Thailand) Lomphet Sor.Songrat | | Khon Kaen province, Thailand | Decision | 5 | 3:00 |
| 1978-10-15 | Loss | (Thailand) Jirasak Petchyindee | | Thailand | Decision | 5 | 3:00 |
| 1978-09-28 | Loss | (Thailand) Santisuk Srisothorn | Rajadamnern Stadium | Bangkok, Thailand | Decision | 5 | 3:00 |
| 1978-09-11 | Win | (Thailand) Pujah Thanakorn | Rajadamnern Stadium | Bangkok, Thailand | Decision | 5 | 3:00 |
| 1978-07-03 | | (Thailand) Rungrit Kathathong | Rajadamnern Stadium | Bangkok, Thailand | | | |
| 1978-04-07 | Win | (Thailand) Yasothorn Lutthaksin | | Hat Yai, Thailand | Decision | 5 | 3:00 |
| 1977-11-18 | Loss | (Thailand) Saknarongnoi Lukbangpakong | Lumpinee Stadium | Bangkok, Thailand | Decision | 5 | 3:00 |
For the Lumpinee Stadium Super Bantamweight (122 lbs) title and a 300,000 baht side-bet.
| 1977-10- | Loss | (Thailand) Saknarongnoi Lukbangpakong | Lumpinee Stadium | Bangkok, Thailand | Decision | 5 | 3:00 |
| 1977-09-26 | Win | (Thailand) Kasemnoi Kiat Tor.Saeng | Rajadamnern Stadium | Bangkok, Thailand | Decision | 5 | 3:00 |
Wins a 800,000 baht side-bet.
| 1977-08- | Loss | (Thailand) Kasemnoi Kiat Tor.Saeng | Rajadamnern Stadium | Bangkok, Thailand | Decision | 5 | 3:00 |
For a 300,000 baht side-bet.
| 1977-07-29 | NC | (Thailand) Maccurach Lukkhaotakiab | Onesongchai, Lumpinee Stadium | Bangkok, Thailand | Ref.stop (Maccurach dismissed) | 5 | |
| 1977-06-07 | Loss | (Thailand) Kasemnoi Kiat Tor.Saeng | Onesongchai, Lumpinee Stadium | Bangkok, Thailand | Decision | 5 | 3:00 |
| 1977-03-29 | Loss | (Thailand) Singnum Petchthanin | Onesongchai, Lumpinee Stadium | Bangkok, Thailand | Decision | 5 | 3:00 |
| 1977- | Loss | (Thailand) Saknarongnoi Lukbangpakong | Lumpinee Stadium | Bangkok, Thailand | Decision | 5 | 3:00 |
| 1976-12-03 | Win | (Thailand) Kordej Sitthiwatrat | Onesongchai, Lumpinee Stadium | Bangkok, Thailand | Decision | 5 | 3:00 |
| 1976-10- | Win | (Thailand) Banpho Sit Siamkrobkrong | Sirimongkol, Lumpinee Stadium | Bangkok, Thailand | Decision | 5 | 3:00 |
| 1976-09-01 | Win | (Thailand) Wanchainoi Saknamcharoen | Sirimongkol, Lumpinee Stadium | Bangkok, Thailand | Decision | 5 | 3:00 |
| 1976-08-25 | Win | (Thailand) Therdasak Songprasert | Suadam, Rajadamnern Stadium | Bangkok, Thailand | Decision | 5 | 3:00 |
Legend: Win Loss Draw/No contest Notes
