= Rick Roufus =

American kickboxer, boxer and mixed martial arts fighter (born 1966)

- Born: Rick John Roufus; June 3, 1966 (age 60); Milwaukee, Wisconsin, United States
- Nickname: The Jet
- Nationality: American
- Height: 6 ft 0 in (183 cm)
- Weight: 205 lb (93 kg; 14 st 9 lb)
- Division: Light middleweight; Middleweight; Super middleweight; Light Heavyweight; Cruiserweight; Heavyweight
- Style: Kickboxing, taekwondo, boxing
- Stance: Southpaw
- Fighting out of: Phoenix, Arizona, United States
- Team: Roufus Kickboxing Center
- Years active: 1985–2012 (kickboxing); 1990–2001 (boxing); 2008–2009 (MMA)

Professional boxing record
- Total: 19
- Wins: 13
- By knockout: 11
- Losses: 5
- Draws: 1

Kickboxing record
- Total: 77
- Wins: 65
- By knockout: 44
- Losses: 9
- Draws: 2
- No contests: 1

Mixed martial arts record
- Total: 10
- Wins: 4
- By knockout: 2
- By decision: 2
- Losses: 6
- By knockout: 1
- By submission: 3
- By decision: 2

Other information
- Notable relatives: Duke Roufus, brother
- Website: rickroufus.pro
- Boxing record from BoxRec
- Mixed martial arts record from Sherdog
- Last updated on: January 16, 2024.

Rick John Roufus (born June 3, 1966) is a retired American kickboxer. He has also competed professionally in boxing and mixed martial arts. An accomplished professional fighter throughout his competitive career, Roufus has won multiple world championships across the globe in several weight classes. He was world champion as a super middleweight, light heavyweight and heavyweight. Roufus held titles for all the major kickboxing associations worldwide (PKA, IKF, ISKA, FFKA and KICK), and is known for his boxing skills and powerful kicks.

Roufus is the Global Director of Fighter Development for PKA Worldwide. In 2012 he was inducted into the World Kickboxing League Hall of Fame.

== Biography and career ==
Rick Roufus began his martial arts practice at the age of 5 under the tutelage of his father Pat J. Roufus, a renowned PKA referee, who had graduated as a black belt in 1973 by Dukan Yun. Rick learned taekwondo from his father. He quickly rose up the national karate points circuit and debuted as a professional kickboxer in his late teens. He had his first professional fight in May 1985 against the U.C. Owens, whom he defeated by unanimous decision after five rounds.

In April 1987, he fought against John Moncayo for the world title of KICK at super middleweight. Roufus knocked out Moncayo in round 7 to win his first world title.

In the beginning of his career, Roufus fought under the rule of full contact where leg kicks, elbow strikes, and knee attacks were not allowed. He changed directions on November 5, 1988, when he challenged Changpuek Kiatsongrit in a non-title fight in Las Vegas. His pre-fight kickboxing record was 28 perfect wins. Roufus knocked Changpuek down twice with his fists in the first round, causing him a broken jaw. During the break, Chanpuek's corner spilled a bucket of water and ice in the ring, trying to buy time for Changpuek to recover. After that, from round 2 to 4, Roufus was knocked down several times by Changpuek. Even though the referee sanctioned heavily Changpuek with 6 foul points, Roufus lost by TKO in the fourth round due to the culmination of low kicks that he was not prepared for. Roufus had found out the same day of the fight that they would fight with leg kick rules. After the fight, Roufus had to be taken out in a stretcher due to the severity of the damage on his legs. Learning from that experience, Roufus brothers sought out Thai experts to learn the art of kicking and kick control.

On June 19, 1991, Roufus faced Marek Piotrowski. It was a rematch, as Piotrowski had defeated him in their first encounter. The vacant ISKA Full Contact Light World title was on the line, while Piotrowski's PKC Full Contact Light Heavyweight World title was also up for grabs. Roufus won by heavy second-round KO from a high kick that left the Polish fighter unconscious on the canvas.

On December 20, 1991, Roufus defended his ISKA Full Contact World Light Heavyweight title against Dutchman Rob Kaman. Initially, Roufus, who had dominated 11 of the 12 rounds, was declared the winner by unanimous decision. Later the bout was declared a no contest after Kaman's corner protested that the fourth round had ended 45 seconds early, the only round they believed could have been. It was critical for Kaman as he had managed to land a high kick in minute 1, causing Roufus to reel. A second fight between the pair took place in February 1994 at Palais Omnisports in Paris-Bercy, France. Tickets for the fight sold out (20,000 people) weeks in advance. Roufus won the match by KO in the second round.

On January 22, 1994, Roufus won the IKF Pro Full Contact Rules Light Heavyweight World Title when he defeated Michael McDonald of Vancouver, BC, Canada, by KO at :43 seconds of round 1 at Caesars Tahoe Casino in Lake Tahoe, Nevada.

On March 26, 1994, he traveled to Montreal, Quebec, Canada, where he faced Jean-Yves Thériault. Roufus won a unanimous decision after 12 rounds, defending his PKC Full Contact World Light Heavyweight title. In Paris, in 1994, he again faced Ernesto Hoost, WMTA Light Heavyweight World Champion. Roufus dominated the fight for the first 10 rounds but finally lost via KO in round 11 when Hoost landed a powerful high kick.

He later entered the world of boxing. He enjoyed some success, but was never able to fight for a world championship. In August 1996, he challenged for the vacant WBC Continental Americas cruiserweight title. He knocked out Sean McClain, and won his first and only title in boxing.

After several losses, Roufus returned to kickboxing. He emerged victorious at the K-1 USA held August 17, 1998, in Las Vegas, quickly dispatching Pedro Fernandez and Jerome Turcan.

On May 15, 1999, in Lowell Massachusetts, he won the IKF Pro International Rules Heavyweight World title when he defeated Stan Longinidis of Box Hill, Victoria, Australia by RSC after Loniginidis suffered a broken bone in his foot at the end of round 9. It was later revealed that Longinidis had been ill weeks leading to the fight. Roufus was ahead on all three judges' cards at the time, 89-81, 86-83 and 88-81.

In his MMA debut, Roufus lost to Maurice Smith in the first round via kimura at the Strikeforce: At The Dome event in Tacoma, Washington on February 23, 2008.

In March 2008, Roufus had his second MMA bout, this time in Newkirk, Oklahoma, for Caged Combat Championship Fights. With his first wrestling training partner in MMA working his corner Daniel K. Finch from Yukon, Oklahoma, He defeated Mike Buell via unanimous decision. After a stint in several local promotions, Roufus brought his mixed martial arts record to four wins with six losses.

In 2002 he defeated Kurt Hasley by unanimous decision in the quarterfinals of K-1 USA Las Vegas. In the semifinals he faced Dewey Cooper, whom he also defeated by unanimous decision. In the final he faced Mike McDonald in rematch of their 1994 bout at Caesars Tahoe, where Roufus won his IKF Full Contact Rules World Title when he knocked McDonald out. It was a rematch McDonald was looking forward to, especially with leg kicks this time. However, Roufus had slipped on the ring canvas in his second bout of the night and town his ACL in the bout. Against McDonald he fought cautiously due to the injury because he did not want to risk hurting it more. In the end, he felt like he had done enough to win. However, after three explosive rounds of action, the scores were Judge #1: 29.5 to 28.5 Roufus, Judge #2: 29.5 to 29 Roufus and Judge #3: 29.5 to 29 McDonald. This should have been a majority decision win for Roufus, but instead, it was a draw due to K-1 rules requiring a fighter to win a tournament by two full points. Because of his injury, Roufus withdrew from the bout by choosing not to fight the extra 4th round, giving McDonald the win.

In October 22, 2011, in Las Vegas, Nevada, Roufus won the IKF Legends Title by forfeit when opponent Mighty Mo failed to pass his Nevada State physical. On the night, Roufus fought an exhibition bout against Anthony Newman. Roufus was finally able to meet up with Mo almost a year later on September 8, 2012, in Los Angeles California, winning a three-round split decision.

His last professional fight was at the K-1 World Grand Prix 2012 in Tokyo final 16. At the age of 46, he faced 25-year-old James Wilson. The result of the match was a draw.

== Personal life ==
He was the older brother of Duke Roufus, who was also a kickboxer and a Muay Thai and mixed martial arts instructor. Duke died in his sleep on October 17, 2025. He was 55 years old.

== Titles ==
- Kickboxing
  - 2011 I.K.F. International Legends Title
  - 2003 K-1 World Grand Prix 2003 USA runner up
  - 2002 K-1 World Grand Prix 2002 Preliminary USA runner up
  - 1999 I.K.F. International Rules Heavyweight World Champion
  - 1998 K-1 USA Grand Prix '98 Champion
  - 1996 I.S.K.A. Full Contact Heavyweight World Champion
  - 1994 I.K.F. Full Contact Light Heavyweight World Champion
  - 1991-94 P.K.C. Light Heavyweight World Champion
  - 1991-94 I.S.K.A. Full Contact Light Heavyweight World Champion
  - 1990 F.F.K.A. Light Heavyweight World Champion
  - 1989 F.F.K.A. Super Middleweight World Champion
  - 1987 K.I.C.K. Super Middleweight World Champion
  - 1986-89 P.K.C. Middleweight U.S.A. Champion
  - 1986 P.K.C. Light Middleweight U.S.A. Champion
- Boxing
  - 1996 W.B.C. Continental Americas Cruiserweight Champion

Hall of fame

2012 WORLD KICKBOXING LEAGUE

== Kickboxing record ==
Kickboxing record
65 wins, 9 losses, 2 draws, 1 no contest
Date	Result	Opponent	Event	Location	Method	Round	Time	Record
2012-10-14	Draw	(United States) James Wilson	K-1 World Grand Prix 2012 in Tokyo final 16	Tokyo, Japan	Decision draw	3	3:00	
2012-09-08	Win	(United States) Mighty Mo	K-1 World Grand Prix	Los Angeles, USA	Decision (split)	3	3:00	
2011-11-22	Win	(United States) Anthony Newman	WCK Muay Thai: USA vs. China	Las Vegas, Nevada, USA	KO (spinning back fist)			
2007-05-00	Win	(United States) John James	Shin Do Kumaté	St. Petersburg, Florida, USA	KO (left high kick)	1		
2006-09-09	Draw	(England) Gary Turner	Shin Do Kumaté X	St. Petersburg, Florida, USA	Decision draw	4	3:00	
2006-03-05	Win	(Iran) Mehrdad Khan Moayedi	Shin Do Kumaté IX	St. Petersburg, Florida, USA	TKO (kick to the body)	3		
2005-04-30	Loss	(Japan) Musashi	K-1 World Grand Prix 2005 in Las Vegas	Las Vegas, Nevada, USA	Decision (majority)	3	3:00	
2004-08-07	Win	(Japan) Akebono	K-1 World Grand Prix 2004 in Las Vegas II	Las Vegas, Nevada, USA	Decision (unanimous)	3	3:00	
2003-08-15	Win	(United States) Jeff Ford	K-1 World Grand Prix 2003 in Las Vegas II	Las Vegas, Nevada, USA	Decision (unanimous)	3	3:00	
2003-05-02	Loss	(United States) Carter Williams	K-1 World Grand Prix 2003 in Las Vegas Final	Las Vegas, Nevada, USA	TKO (referee stoppage)	1	2:24	
Fails to qualify for K-1 World Grand Prix 2003 Final Elimination.
2003-05-02	Win	(United States) Maurice Smith	K-1 World Grand Prix 2003 in Las Vegas Semi-final	Las Vegas, Nevada, USA	Decision (unanimous)	3	3:00	
2003-05-02	Win	(Brazil) Eduardo Maiorino	K-1 World Grand Prix 2003 in Las Vegas Quarter-final	Las Vegas, Nevada, USA	TKO (2 knockdowns)	1	2:54	
2002-05-03	Loss	(Canada) Michael McDonald	K-1 World Grand Prix 2002 Preliminary USA Final	Las Vegas, Nevada, USA	TKO (corner stoppage)	4	3:00	
Fails to qualify for K-1 World Grand Prix 2002 in Las Vegas.
2002-05-03	Win	(United States) Dewey Cooper	K-1 World Grand Prix 2002 Preliminary USA Semi-final	Las Vegas, Nevada, USA	Decision (unanimous)	3	3:00	
2002-05-03	Win	(United States) Kurt Hasley	K-1 World Grand Prix 2002 Preliminary USA Quarter-final	Las Vegas, Nevada, USA	Decision (unanimous)	3	3:00	
2000-03-18	Loss	(France) Cyrille Diabate	I.S.K.A. Championship	Las Vegas, Nevada, USA	TKO (knee injury)	3	3:00	
1999-05-15	Win	(Australia) Stan Longinidis	MASS Destruction	Lowell, Massachusetts, USA	TKO (retirement)	9	3:00	
Wins IKF International Rules World Heavyweight World title. (1)
1998-09-27	Loss	(Brazil) Francisco Filho	K-1 World Grand Prix '98 opening round	Osaka, Japan	KO (right low kick)	3	0:15	
Fails to qualify for K-1 Grand Prix '98 Final Round.
1998-08-07	Win	(United States) Curtis Schuster	K-1 USA Grand Prix '98 Final	Las Vegas, Nevada, USA	Gave up (unable to fight)	N/A	N/A	
Wins K-1 USA Grand Prix '98 and qualifies for K-1 World Grand Prix '98 opening round.
1998-08-07	Win	(France) Jerome Turcan	K-1 USA Grand Prix '98 Semi-final	Las Vegas, Nevada, USA	KO (right hook)	2	0:58	
1998-08-07	Win	(Mexico) Pedro Fernandez	K-1 USA Grand Prix '98 Quarter-final	Las Vegas, Nevada, United States	KO (left hook)	2	1:50	
1997-09-07	Loss	(France) Jérôme Le Banner	K-1 Grand Prix '97 1st round	Osaka, Osaka, Japan	TKO (referee stoppage)	3	2:05	
Fails to qualify for K-1 Grand Prix '97 Final.
1996-06-01	Win	(Belarus) Igor Sharapov	ISKA: The Clash Of Champions	Paris, France	TKO (doctor stoppage)	4	2:00	
Wins ISKA Full Contact Heavyweight World title.
1995-03-25	Win	(Netherlands) Martin van Emmen	Nuit des Titans	Marseille France	KO (hook)			
1995-03-13	Win	(United States) Lavelle Robinson	I.S.K.A. Kickboxing	Santa Cruz, California, USA	KO (left high kick)	3	0:30	
1994-11-12	Loss	(Netherlands) Ernesto Hoost	Thriller in Marseille	Marseille, France	KO (right high kick)	11	1:02	
Loses ISKA Full Contact Light Heavyweight World title.
1994	Exhibition	(France) Dominique Valera		Paris, France	Exhibition			
1994-03-26	Win	(Canada) Jean-Yves Thériault	Karatemania VIII	Montreal, Quebec, Canada	Decision (unanimous)	12	2:00	
Retains PKC Light Heavyweight World title. (1)
1994-02-05	Win	(Netherlands) Rob Kaman	Le Choc des Titans	Paris, France	KO (left hook)	2	1:06	
Retains ISKA Full Contact Light Heavyweight World title. (4)
1994-01-22	Win	(Canada) Michael McDonald	International Kickboxing Federation - Karatemania	Tahoe, Nevada, USA	KO	1	0:43	
Wins IKF Full Contact Light Heavyweight title.
1993-05-07	Win	(Poland) Józef Warchoł	ISKA World Title	Paris, France	TKO (corner quit after round)	3		
1993-03-26	Win	(Netherlands) Luc Verheye	ISKA Kickboxing	Paris, France	KO (kick to the liver)	4		
1992-12-15	Win	(United States) Jersey Long	Karatemania V	Montreal, Quebec, Canada	TKO			
Retains ISKA. Full Contact Light Heavyweight World title. (3)
1992-11-13	Win	(Netherlands) Ernesto Hoost	ISKA: Thriller en Marsella	Marseille, France	Decision (unanimous)	12	2:00	
Retains ISKA Full Contact Light Heavyweight World title. (2)
1992-04-25	Win	(South Africa) Henk Pelser	Karatemania IV	Atlanta, Georgia, USA	KO	8		
1991-12-20	No Contest	(Netherlands) Rob Kaman	Les Choc Des Geants	Paris, France	No contest	12	2:00	
Roufus was initially declared the winner by decision but the match was later declared a no-contest after Kaman's corner protested that only 1 minute had been fought in the 4th Round - a round that could have been critical to Kaman as he had hurt his opponent. As a result he still retained his ISKA Full Contact Light Heavyweight World title. (1)
1991-08-24	Win	(United States) William Knorr	Karatemania III	USA	Disqualification	4		
William Knorr failure to attempt 8 kick minimum in 3 different rounds
1991-06-22	Win	(Poland) Marek Piotrowski		Chicago, Illinois, USA	KO (high kick)	2	0:59	
Wins ISKA Full-Contact Light Heavyweight World Title and Piotrowski's PKC Full Contact Light Heavyweight World title.
1990-02-04	Win	(United States) Kevin Whaley	FFKA World Title	Lancaster, Pennsylvania, USA	Decision (unanimous)	10	2:00	
Wins FFKA Light Heavyweight World title.
1990	Win	(United States) Bob Thurman		USA	KO (left hook)	2		
1989-08-19	Loss	(Poland) Marek Piotrowski		Chicago, Illinois, USA	Decision (unanimous)	10	2:00	
Loses PKC Middleweight U.S title.
1989-07-20	Win	(England) Andy Mayo		Milwaukee, Wisconsin, USA	KO	3		
Wins FFKA Super Middleweight World title.
1989-00-00	Win	(France) Michel Mangeot						
1989-04-01	Win	(United States) Manson Gibson		USA	Decision			
1988-11-05	Loss	(Thailand) Changpuek Kiatsongrit	Super Fight Kickboxing	Las Vegas, Nevada, USA	TKO (left low kicks)	5	1:23	
1988-00-00	Win	(United States) Mike Steele		USA	KO (left hook)	1	1:15	
1988-00-00	Win	(United States) Chris Getz	ISKA Kickboxing	USA	KO (left hook)	1	2:0	
1988-01-28	Win	(United States) William Knorr		Milwaukee, Wisconsin, USA	TKO (left round kick)	3		
Retains PKC Middleweight U.S title.
1987-00-00	Win	(United States) Manson Gibson		USA	Decision			
1987-04-16	Win	(United States) John Moncayo	Karatemania II	Atlanta, Georgia, USA	KO	7	1:04	
Wins KICK Super Middleweight World title.
1987-03-13	Win	(United States) Jordan Keepers	PKC US Middleweight Championship	USA	Decision (unanimous)	6	2	
1986-11-20	Win	(United States) Rich Lopez	Nautilus American Kickboxing Championships	Lake Helen, Florida, USA	Decision (unanimous)	9	2:00	
Retains PKC Middleweight U.S title.
1986-09-10	Win	(United States) Oliver Miller	PKC US Middleweight Championship	Atlanta, Georgia, USA	Decision (unanimous)	9	2:00	
Wins PKC Middleweight U.S title.
1986-05-21	Win	(United States) Larry McFadden		USA				
1986-04-26	Win	(United States) Tony Smith	Karatemania I	Atlanta, Georgia, USA	KO (left high kick)	2		
Retains PKC Light Middleweight U.S title.
1986-01-08	Win	(United States) Sylvester Cash		Atlanta, Georgia, USA	Decision (unanimous)	9	2:00	
Wins PKC Light Middleweight U.S title.
1985-11-02	Win	(United States) Gerald Murphy	Kenwood U.S. Open National Karate Championships	Daytona Beach, Florida, USA	KO (punch)	1		
1985-08-16	Win	(United States) Tommy Richardson		Toledo, Florida, USA	Decision (unanimous)			
1985-00-00	Win	(United States) U.C. Owens	PKC US Middleweight Championship	Minneapolis, Minnesota, USA	Decision (unanimous)	5	2	
1985-00-00	Win	(United States) Mike Winklejohn		USA	Decision (unanimous)			
Legend: Win Loss Draw/no contest Notes

== Mixed martial arts record ==
Professional record breakdown
10 matches	4 wins	6 losses
By knockout	2	1
By submission	0	3
By decision	2	2

Res.	Record	Opponent	Method	Event	Date	Round	Time	Location	Notes
Loss	4–6	Wayne Cole	Submission (armbar)	Slammin Jammin Weekend 3	May 9, 2009	1	0:36	Newkirk, Oklahoma, United States	For the vacant C3 Fights Light Heavyweight Championship.
Loss	4–5	Ryan Jimmo	TKO (punches)	Phoenix Fight Promotions: Wanted	November 29, 2008	1	2:24	Dartmouth, Nova Scotia, Canada	
Loss	4–4	Hector Ramirez	Decision (unanimous)	SuperFights MMA: Night of Combat 2	October 11, 2008	3	5:00	Las Vegas, Nevada, United States	
Win	4–3	Reggie Cato	TKO (corner stoppage)	C3 Fights: Clash in Concho	September 19, 2008	2	5:00	Concho, Oklahoma, United States	
Loss	3–3	Todd Brown	Submission (triangle choke)	Combat USA: Fight Night	June 28, 2008	2	1:31	Harris, Michigan, United States	
Win	3–2	Roberto Martinez	Decision (unanimous)	C3 Fights: Contenders	June 7, 2008	3	3:00	Concho, Oklahoma, United States	
Win	2–2	B.J. Lacy	KO (punches)	Combat USA: Battle in the Bay 7	May 30, 2008	3	N/A	Green Bay, Wisconsin, USA	
Loss	1–2	Michael McDonald	Decision (unanimous)	Strike FC: Night of Gladiators	April 18, 2008	2	5:00	Ploiești, Romania	
Win	1–1	Michael Buell	Decision (unanimous)	C3 Fights: Battle on the Border	March 29, 2008	3	3:00	Newkirk, Oklahoma, United States	Light Heavyweight debut.
Loss	0–1	Maurice Smith	Submission (straight armbar)	Strikeforce: At The Dome	February 23, 2008	1	1:53	Tacoma, Washington, United States	Heavyweight debut.

== Professional boxing record ==
13 wins (11 knockouts, 2 decisions), 5 losses (3 knockouts, 2 decisions), 1 draw
Result	Record	Opponent	Type	Round	Date	Location	Notes
Loss	13-5-1	(Canada) Dale Brown	TKO	9	November 30, 2001	Montreal, Quebec, Canada	Referee stopped the bout after the ninth round.
Win	13-4-1	(United States) James Johnson	UD	4	February 23, 2001	Janesville, Wisconsin, United States	
Loss	12-4-1	(France) Ismael Youla	PTS	8	February 21, 1998	Paris, France	
Loss	12-3-1	(United States) Arthur Williams	TKO	4	February 22, 1997	Condado, Puerto Rico, United States	USBA Cruiserweight Title.
Loss	12-2-1	(United States) Bobby Crabtree	TKO	7	September 27, 1996	Atlantic City, New Jersey, United States	
Win	12-1-1	(United States) Sean McClain	TKO	4	August 10, 1996	Las Vegas, Nevada, United States	WBC Continental Americas Cruiserweight Title.
Win	11-1-1	(United States) Carlton Brown	KO	2	April 27, 1996	Doraville, Georgia, United States	
Win	10-1-1	(United States) Rogue Dooley	TKO	1	April 26, 1996	Harvey, Illinois, United States	
Win	9-1-1	(United States) Stan Johnson	TKO	1	April 16, 1996	Indianapolis, Indiana, United States	
Win	8-1-1	(United States) Rick Wilks	KO	1	March 30, 1996	Waterloo, Iowa, United States	
Win	7-1-1	(United States) Raymond Wilks	KO	1	March 29, 1996	Dolton, Illinois, United States	
Draw	6-1-1	(United States) Louis Monaco	PTS	4	January 26, 1996	Las Vegas, Nevada, United States	
Win	6-1	(United States) Gene Ibarra	TKO	2	November 4, 1995	Las Vegas, Nevada, United States	
Win	5-1	(United States) Daniel Salcedo	TKO	2	September 30, 1995	Las Vegas, Nevada, United States	
Win	4-1	(United States) Jordan Keepers	KO	2	September 16, 1995	Milwaukee, Wisconsin, United States	
Win	3-1	(United States) Ron Preston	UD	4	August 18, 1995	Las Vegas, Nevada, United States	
Win	2-1	(United States) Dennis Weaver	TKO	2	August 3, 1995	Las Vegas, Nevada, United States	
Win	1-1	(United States) Mike Brainard	TKO	3	June 17, 1995	Las Vegas, Nevada, United States	
Loss	0-1	(United States) Ricardo Dabney	PTS	4	April 29, 1990	Atlantic City, New Jersey, United States	
