= Sagat Petchyindee =

Thai former professional Muay Thai fighter, kickboxer, and boxer

- Born: Wirun Phonphimai; November 30, 1957 (age 68); Phimai, Nakhon Ratchasima, Thailand
- Native name: วิรุฬห์ ผลพิมาย
- Other names: Sagat Porntawee (สกัด พรทวี)
- Nickname: KO King (ราชาน็อกเร็ว)
- Height: 165 cm (5 ft 5 in)
- Division: Bantamweight; Super Bantamweight; Lightweight; Light Welterweight
- Style: Muay Thai (Muay Mat)
- Stance: Orthodox

Professional boxing record
- Total: 14
- Wins: 12
- By knockout: 8
- Losses: 2

Kickboxing record
- Total: 317
- Wins: 266
- By knockout: 151
- Losses: 40
- Draws: 11

Other information
- Boxing record from BoxRec

Wirun Phonphimai (Thai: วิรุฬห์ ผลพิมาย; born November 30, 1957), known professionally as Sagat Petchyindee (Thai: สกัด เพชรยินดี), is a Thai former professional Muay Thai fighter, kickboxer, boxer, trainer, and actor. He is a two-time Lumpinee Stadium champion, a two-time Rajadamnern Stadium champion, and also challenged for a WBC Super Bantamweight title in boxing. He is widely considered one of the greatest Muay Thai fighters of all time.

== Combat career ==
=== Muay Thai ===
He amassed a total of 317 Thai boxing fights with 266 wins, 40 losses and 11 draws, 151 of those victories coming by way of KO/TKO.

Sagat also fought Dieselnoi Chor Thanasukarn twice in 1984, on June 7 and October 6, but lost both fights to Dieselnoi on points.

Sagat fought Pete Cunningham and Ronnie Green.

=== Boxing ===
Moreover, Sagat Petchyindee (in the name Sagat Porntawee) has a total of 14 professional boxing fights with 12 victories (8 KO/TKO) and 2 defeats. He lost to Wilfredo Gómez in boxing. The bout with Gómez was for the WBC's World Super Bantamweight Championship and was preceded by a major tragedy when part of the stadium collapsed. According to Virat Vachirarattanawong, who would later become Sagat's manager, tickets for the fight were priced at 500 baht, with scalpers reselling them for up to 1,000 baht amid overwhelming demand. Virat himself was among the event's sponsors. At the time, Sagat had only two professional boxing bouts to his name and had trained exclusively with Muay Thai fighters such as Wichannoi Porntawee and Ruengsak Porntawee. Nevertheless, many in Thailand's boxing community believed he would prevail, particularly as the fight was held in his hometown of Nakhon Ratchasima and the country had no reigning world champion at the time. The tragedy began during the first undercard fight, when one side of the grandstand started to tilt under the weight and excitement of the crowd. Eventually, two of the more than ten grandstands gave way, yet most spectators stayed and the event continued. The main event commenced at 8:29 pm (ICT), with Sagat pressing forward relentlessly against Gómez. Despite his inexperience in international boxing, his punches carried the heavy power of a seasoned Muay Thai fighter, but none landed cleanly. Gómez’s sharp combinations gradually wore him down, and Sagat was stopped in the third round. During the chaos, a third grandstand collapsed, an incident coinciding with the harrowing scene of a pregnant woman whose baby was tragically delivered amid the turmoil. After the fight, electrical currents leaked across the ground, forcing the crowd to scramble for higher ground. Although the event continued with further bouts after this incident, most spectators had already lost interest and began leaving the stadium. Based on Virat's account, the exact number of casualties was never officially disclosed, but he estimated that around a hundred people had been affected. According to BoxRec, however, 10 people were reported killed and approximately 300 injured.

== Post career ==
Since retiring, Sagat works as a kickboxing trainer.

Sagat taught Firas Zahabi, who later co-founded the Tristar Gym, the art of Muay Thai.

Sagat was likely the inspiration for the character Sagat in the Street Fighter video game.

== Personal life ==
Sagat was born into a boxing family. His grandfather was Sukh Prasarthinpimai, a renowned Muay Thai fighter in the 1950s, known by the nickname "Yak Phi Khamot" (the Ghost Giant).

== Titles and accomplishments ==
=== Muay Thai ===
- Rajadamnern Stadium
  - 1976 Rajadamnern Bantamweight (118 lbs) Champion
  - 1984 Rajadamnern Light Welterweight (140 lbs) Champion
    - One successful title defense
- Lumpinee Stadium
  - 1985 Lumpinee Stadium Lightweight (135 lbs) Champion
    - One successful title defense
  - 1988 Lumpinee Stadium Lightweight (135 lbs) Champion

=== Kickboxing ===
- World Kickboxing Association
  - WKA World Light Welterweight (140 lbs) Champion

=== Boxing ===
- 1986 WBC Asian Boxing Council Lightweight (135 lbs) Champion
- 1986 Thailand Lightweight (135 lbs) Champion
- 1986 OPBF Lightweight (135 lbs) Champion (2 defenses)

== Professional boxing record ==
| 14 fights | 12 wins | 2 losses |
|---|---|---|
| By knockout | 8 | 1 |
| By decision | 4 | 1 |

| No. | Result | Record | Opponent | Type | Round, time | Date | Location | Notes |
|---|---|---|---|---|---|---|---|---|
| 14 | Loss | 12-2 | (Korea) Bong-Chun Park | PTS | 12 (12) | 28 Feb 1988 | Daejeon, South Korea | Loses the OPBF Lightweight title |
| 13 | Win | 12-1 | (Indonesia) Bisenti Santoso | KO | 1 | 05 Jul 1987 | Gresik, Indonesia | Defends the OPBF Lightweight title |
| 12 | Win | 11-1 | (Indonesia) Muhammed Juhari | PTS | 12 (12) | 26 Feb 1987 | Bangkok, Thailand | Defends the OPBF Lightweight title |
| 11 | Win | 10-1 | (Australia) Dale Artango | TKO | 6 (12) | 28 Oct 1986 | Bangkok, Thailand | Wins the vacant OPBF Lightweight title |
| 10 | Win | 9-1 | (Thailand) Phansaknoi Kiatkraisorn | KO | 1 (10) | 27 Aug 1986 | Rajadamnern Stadium, Bangkok, Thailand | Wins the vacant Thailand Lightweight title |
| 9 | Win | 8-1 | (Philippines) Boy Romero | KO | 2 (12) | 22 Feb 1986 | El Saba Al Salem Stadium, Kuwait City, Kuwait | Wins the vacant WBC Asian Boxing Council Lightweight title |
| 8 | Win | 7-1 | (Thailand) Payungsak Sithsamtahan | KO | 3 | 18 Jan 1986 | Hua Mark Indoor Stadium, Bangkok, Thailand | |
| 7 | Win | 6-1 | (Thailand) Chaisuriya Somthamkichaub | KO | 1 | 28 Dec 1985 | Bangkok, Thailand | |
| 6 | Win | 5-1 | (Thailand) Singsamuth Porchaivat | KO | 1 | 30 Sep 1985 | Bangkok, Thailand | |
| 5 | Win | 4-1 | (Thailand) Somsak Wongthorn | KO | 1 | 15 Aug 1985 | Bangkok, Thailand | |
| 4 | Win | 3-1 | (Thailand) Dawthong Chuvatana | PTS | 10 (10) | 06 Sep 1984 | Bangkok, Thailand | |
| 3 | Loss | 2-1 | (Puerto Rico) Wilfredo Gómez | TKO | 3 (15) | 02 Jun 1978 | Provincial Stadium, Nakhon Ratchasima, Thailand | For the WBC & Lineal Super Bantamweight titles |
| 2 | Win | 2-0 | (Japan) Hisami Mizuno | KO | 6 (10) | 14 Jan 1978 | Buriram, Thailand | |
| 1 | Win | 1-0 | (Mexico) Juan Antonio Lopez | PTS | 10 (10) | 10 Nov 1977 | Bangkok, Thailand | |

== Muay Thai record ==
Muay Thai Record
| Date | Result | Opponent | Event | Location | Method | Round | Time |
|---|---|---|---|---|---|---|---|
| ? | Loss | (France) Stéphane Nikiéma | | Macao | Decision | | |
| 1990-06-16 | Loss | (Canada) Pete Cunningham | | Sydney, Australia | Decision (unanimous) | 11 | 2:00 |
For the K.I.C.K Intercontinental Light Welterweight (140 lbs) title.
| 1989-09-05 | Draw | (Thailand) Nokweed Devy | AJKF "REAL BOUT" | Tokyo, Japan | Decision | 5 | 3:00 |
| 1989-06-30 | Win | (Thailand) Kiattisak Neungmuangmaha | Lumpinee Stadium | Bangkok, Thailand | Decision | 5 | 3:00 |
| 1989-03-18 | Win | (United Kingdom) Ronnie Green | AJKF | Tokyo, Japan | Decision (Unanimous) | 5 | 3:00 |
| 1988-09-10 | Draw | (Canada) Pete Cunningham | | Anaheim, California, United States | Decision (split) | 5 | 3:00 |
| 1988-07-21 | Loss | (Thailand) Komtae Chor.Suananant | | Chaosingtothong Chanthaburi, Thailand | Decision | 5 | 3:00 |
| 1988-06-17 | Win | (Thailand) Komtae Chor.Suananant | Samrong Stadium | Samut Prakan, Thailand | TKO (Doctor stoppage) | 2 | |
Wins the Lumpinee Stadium Lightweight (135 lbs) title.
| 1988-04-02 | Win | (Thailand) Raktae Muangsurin | WKA Ikki Kajiwara Memorial Show '88 | Tokyo, Japan | KO (Punches) | 3 | |
| 1986-11-29 | Win | (Thailand) Komtae Chor.Suananant | Japan-Thailand relation Charity event "Mysterious Muay Thai Champions Clash" | Tokyo, Japan | Decision | 5 | 3:00 |
| 1986- | Loss | (Thailand) Wanpadet Sitkhrumai | Rajadamnern Stadium | Bangkok, Thailand | Decision | 5 | 3:00 |
| 1986-03-25 | Loss | (Thailand) Nokweed Devy | Lumpinee Stadium | Bangkok, Thailand | Decision | 5 | 3:00 |
| 1985-10-22 | Win | (Thailand) Sawainoi Daopadriew | Lumpinee Stadium | Bangkok, Thailand | KO | 1 | |
Defends the Lumpinee Stadium Lightweight (135 lbs) title.
| 1985-08-30 | Win | (Thailand) Komtae Chor.Suananant | Rajadamnern Stadium | Bangkok, Thailand | TKO (Doctor Stoppage) | 2 | |
Defends the Rajadamnern Light Welterweight (140 lbs) title.
| 1985-07-18 | Win | (Thailand) Fanta Phetmuangtrat | Rajadamnern Stadium | Bangkok, Thailand | KO | 4 | |
| 1985-03-18 | Loss | (Thailand) Krongsak Na Teerawong | Rajadamnern Stadium | Bangkok, Thailand | Decision | 5 | 3:00 |
| 1985-02-15 | | (Thailand) Kitti Sor.Thanikul | Lumpinee Stadium | Bangkok, Thailand | | | |
| 1984-10-06 | Loss | (Thailand) Dieselnoi Chor Thanasukarn | | Isan, Thailand | Decision | 5 | 3:00 |
For the Yodmuaythai title.
| 1984-07-30 | Win | (Thailand) Somsong Kiatoranee | Rajadamnern Stadium | Bangkok, Thailand | KO (Punches) | 3 | |
Wins the Rajadamnern Light Welterweight (140 lbs) title.
| 1984-06-07 | Loss | (Thailand) Dieselnoi Chor Thanasukarn | Rajadamnern Stadium | Bangkok, Thailand | Decision | 5 | 3:00 |
| 1984-05-03 | Win | (Thailand) Samart Prasarnmit | | Bangkok, Thailand | Referee stoppage | 2 | |
| 1984-04-05 | Win | (Thailand) Mongkolkhiao Sitchang | Rajadamnern Stadium | Bangkok, Thailand | KO (Body punch) | 2 | |
| 1982-10-21 | Loss | (Thailand) Fanta Phetmuangtrat | Rajadamnern Stadium | Bangkok, Thailand | Decision | 5 | 3:00 |
| 1982-09-28 | Win | (Thailand) Raktae Muangsurin | Lumpinee Stadium | Bangkok, Thailand | TKO (Punches) | 2 | |
| 1982-08-03 | Loss | (Thailand) Padejsuk Pitsanurachan | | Bangkok, Thailand | Decision | 5 | 3:00 |
| 1982-06-10 | Loss | (Thailand) Padejsuk Pitsanurachan | Rajadamnern Stadium | Bangkok, Thailand | Decision | 5 | 3:00 |
| 1982-03-04 | | (Thailand) Mangkon Kiatsitchang | Rajadamnern Stadium | Bangkok, Thailand | | | |
| 1981-12-18 | Win | (Thailand) Pornsak Sitchang | Sirimongkol, Lumpinee Stadium | Bangkok, Thailand | Decision | 5 | 3:00 |
| 1981-09-22 | Loss | (Thailand) Kaopong Sitichuchai | Lumpinee Stadium | Bangkok, Thailand | TKO (Punches) | 4 | |
| 1981-08-21 | Loss | (Thailand) Krongsak Sakkasem | Lumpinee Stadium | Bangkok, Thailand | Decision | 5 | 3:00 |
| 1981-06-12 | Win | (Thailand) Khaosod Sitpraprom | Lumpinee Stadium | Bangkok, Thailand | KO (Punches) | 3 | |
| 1981-05-29 | Win | (Thailand) Kaopong Sitichuchai | Lumpinee Stadium | Bangkok, Thailand | KO (Punches) | 3 | |
| 1980-12-18 | Win | (Thailand) Jirasak Lukmatulee | Rajadamnern Stadium | Bangkok, Thailand | KO (Punches) | 1 | 0:18 |
| 1980-11-25 | Loss | (Thailand) Krongsak Na Teerawong | Lumpinee Stadium | Bangkok, Thailand | Decision | 5 | 3:00 |
| 1980-03-05 | Loss | (Thailand) Seksan Sor.Theppitak | Rajadamnern Stadium | Bangkok, Thailand | Decision | 5 | 3:00 |
| 1980-01-22 | Loss | (Thailand) Payap Premchai | Lumpinee Stadium | Bangkok, Thailand | Decision | 5 | 3:00 |
| 1979-07-27 | Loss | (Thailand) Siprae Kiatsompop | Lumpinee Stadium | Bangkok, Thailand | Decision | 5 | 3:00 |
| 1979-04-03 | Loss | (Thailand) Posai Sitiboonlert | | Bangkok, Thailand | Decision | 5 | 3:00 |
| 1979-03-03 | Loss | (Thailand) Jitti Muangkhonkaen | Lumpinee Stadium | Bangkok, Thailand | Decision | 5 | 3:00 |
| 1979-01-17 | Loss | (Thailand) Saeksan Sor.Thepittak | Rajadamnern Stadium | Bangkok, Thailand | Decision | 5 | 3:00 |
| 1978-12-05 | Win | (Thailand) Jitti Muangkhonkaen | Lumpinee Stadium | Bangkok, Thailand | Decision | 5 | 3:00 |
| 1978-11-02 | Loss | (Thailand) Padejsuk Pitsanurachan | | Bangkok, Thailand | Decision | 5 | 3:00 |
| 1978-10-10 | Win | (Thailand) Kaopong Sitichuchai | Lumpinee Stadium | Bangkok, Thailand | KO (Punches) | 4 | |
| 1978-08-28 | Win | (Thailand) Padejsuk Pitsanurachan | Rajadamnern Stadium | Bangkok, Thailand | Decision | 5 | 3:00 |
| 1978-08-18 | Win | (Netherlands) Robbie Harbin | Lumpinee Stadium | Bangkok, Thailand | KO | 1 | |
| 1977-09-23 | Win | (Thailand) Seksan Sor.Theppitak | Lumpinee Stadium | Bangkok, Thailand | KO | 1 | |
| 1977-08-25 | Win | (Thailand) Kaew Sitpordaeng | | Bangkok, Thailand | KO | 4 | |
| 1977-08- | Win | (Thailand) Kengkaj Kiatkriangkrai | Rajadamnern Stadium | Bangkok, Thailand | Decision | 5 | 3:00 |
| 1977-07- | Loss | (Thailand) Samersing Tianhiran | Rajadamnern Stadium | Bangkok, Thailand | Decision | 5 | 3:00 |
| 1977-07-06 | Loss | (Thailand) Jocky Sitkanpai | | Bangkok, Thailand | Decision | 5 | 3:00 |
| 1977-06-02 | Win | (Thailand) Amnuaydet Davy | Rajadamnern Stadium | Bangkok, Thailand | Decision | 5 | 3:00 |
| 1977-05-03 | NC | (Thailand) Bundit Singprakarn | | Bangkok, Thailand | Ref stop. (Bundit dismissed) | 3 | |
| 1977-03-31 | Loss | (Thailand) Samersing Tianhiran | | Bangkok, Thailand | Decision | 5 | 3:00 |
| 1977-03-11 | Win | (Thailand) Wangwon Lukmatulee | | Bangkok, Thailand | KO | 3 | |
| 1977-02-24 | Loss | (Thailand) Narongnoi Kiatbandit | | Bangkok, Thailand | Decision | 5 | 3:00 |
| 1977-01-27 | Win | (Thailand) Kengkaj Kiatkriangkrai | Rajadamnern Stadium | Bangkok, Thailand | Decision | 5 | 3:00 |
| 1976-12-29 | Loss | (Thailand) Nongkhai Sor.Prapatsorn | Rajadamnern Stadium | Bangkok, Thailand | Decision | 5 | 3:00 |
| 1976-12-07 | Win | (Thailand) Wangwan Lukmatulee | Lumpinee Stadium | Bangkok, Thailand | Decision | 5 | 3:00 |
| 1976-11-11 | Win | (Thailand) Phetmongkol Ruekchai | Rajadamnern Stadium | Bangkok, Thailand | KO | 4 | |
| 1976-09-27 | Win | (Thailand) Anmuyadet Devy | Rajadamnern Stadium | Bangkok, Thailand | Decision | 5 | 3:00 |
| 1976-08-26 | Loss | (Thailand) Narongnoi Kiatbandit | Rajadamnern Stadium | Bangkok, Thailand | Decision | 5 | 3:00 |
| 1976-07-22 | Win | (Thailand) Jintadet Sakniran | Rajadamnern Stadium | Bangkok, Thailand | Decision | 5 | 3:00 |
| 1976-06-09 | Loss | (Thailand) Nongkhai Sor.Prapatsorn | Rajadamnern Stadium | Bangkok, Thailand | Decision | 5 | 3:00 |
| 1976-05-06 | Win | (Thailand) Jintadet Sakniran | Rajadamnern Stadium | Bangkok, Thailand | Decision | 5 | 3:00 |
| 1976-03-26 | Win | (Thailand) Saksakon Sakchannarong | Rajadamnern Stadium | Bangkok, Thailand | Decision | 5 | 3:00 |
Wins the Rajadamnern Bantamweight (118 lbs) title.
| 1976-03-02 | Win | (Thailand) Paruhat Loh-ngoen | Lumpinee Stadium | Bangkok, Thailand | Decision | 5 | 3:00 |
| 1976-02-12 | Loss | (Thailand) Denthoraneenoi Luadtaksin | Rajadamnern Stadium | Bangkok, Thailand | Decision | 5 | 3:00 |
| 1976-01-21 | Win | (Thailand) Kaopong Sitchuchai | | Rayong, Thailand | Decision | 5 | 3:00 |
| 1975-12-14 | Win | (Thailand) Adam Sor.Or.Nor. | Rajadamnern Stadium | Bangkok, Thailand | Decision | 5 | 3:00 |
| 1975-11-12 | Win | (Thailand) Adam Sor.Or.Nor. | Rajadamnern Stadium | Bangkok, Thailand | Decision | 5 | 3:00 |
| 1975-10-06 | Loss | (Thailand) Ruenpae Sitwatnang | Rajadamnern Stadium | Bangkok, Thailand | Decision | 5 | 3:00 |
| 1975-08-14 | Win | (Thailand) Thewarat Sitponathep | Rajadamnern Stadium | Bangkok, Thailand | Decision | 5 | 3:00 |
| 1975-06-01 | Win | (Thailand) Singnum Phettanin | Rajadamnern Stadium | Bangkok, Thailand | Decision | 5 | 3:00 |
| 1975-05-21 | Win | (Thailand) Singsuk Sor.Rupsoy | Rajadamnern Stadium | Bangkok, Thailand | TKO | 4 | |
| 1975-04-29 | Loss | (Thailand) Manachai Phetputhon | Rajadamnern Stadium | Bangkok, Thailand | Decision | 5 | 3:00 |
| 1975-04-03 | Win | (Thailand) Thanupit Sit.Sor.Wor. | Rajadamnern Stadium | Bangkok, Thailand | Decision | 5 | 3:00 |
| 1975-03-19 | Loss | (Thailand) Nongrak Singkrungthong | Rajadamnern Stadium | Bangkok, Thailand | Decision | 5 | 3:00 |
| 1975-02-12 | Win | (Thailand) Panachadet Wor.Chatniran | Rajadamnern Stadium | Bangkok, Thailand | TKO | 4 | |
| 1975-01-29 | Win | (Thailand) Dawut Sor.Or.Nor. | Lumpinee Stadium | Bangkok, Thailand | Decision | 5 | 3:00 |
| 1975-01-06 | Loss | (Thailand) Thanuthong Kiatmunagthai | Rajadamnern Stadium | Bangkok, Thailand | Decision | 5 | 3:00 |
Legend: Win Loss Draw/No contest Notes
