= Dieselnoi Chor Thanasukarn =

Thai former professional Muay Thai fighter

Dieselnoi Chor.Thanasukarn
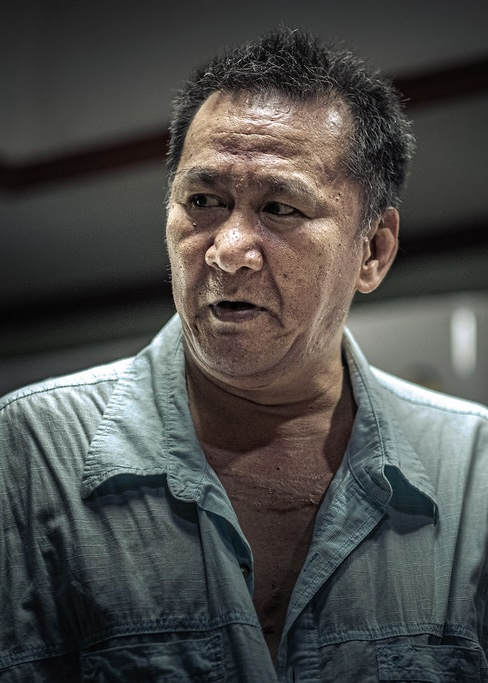
- Dieselnoi in 2020
- Born: Thanakorn Sorndee; December 27, 1961 (age 64); Ayutthaya, Thailand
- Native name: ชรินทร์ สอนดี
- Other names: Dieselnoi Sor.Sirinan (ดีเซลน้อย ส.ศิรินันท์); Dieselnoi Sor.Worakulchai (ดีเซลน้อย ส.วรกุลชัย)
- Nickname: Lord Sky-Piercing Knee (ขุนเข่าทะลุฟ้า)
- Height: 188 cm (6 ft 2 in)
- Division: Lightweight
- Style: Muay Thai (Muay Khao)
- Stance: Orthodox
- Team: Sor.Banchongsak Gym (1974); Sor.Worakulchai Gym (1974-1976); Chor.Thanasukarn Gym (1976–1977); Sor.Thanikul Gym (1977-1982); Hapalang Gym (1982-1985)
- Trainer: Banchong Ngarm-ket
- Years active: c. 1974–1985

Professional boxing record
- Total: 2
- Wins: 1
- Losses: 1
- By knockout: 1

Kickboxing record
- Total: 119
- Wins: 110
- Losses: 5
- By knockout: 2
- Draws: 4

Charin Sorndee (Thai: ชรินทร์ สอนดี; born December 27, 1961), known professionally as Dieselnoi Chor.Thanasukarn (Thai: ดีเซลน้อย ช.ธนะสุกาญจน์), is a Thai former professional Muay Thai fighter. He was the Lumpinee Stadium Lightweight Champion for three years until he retired after running out of challengers and was the 1982 Sports Writers Association of Thailand Fighter of the Year. Nicknamed "Lord Sky-Piercing Knee", he is often regarded as one of the greatest and most dominant fighters in the history of Muay Thai who was especially known for his devastating knees.

== Biography and career ==
Dieselnoi (Little Diesel) was born on December 27, 1961, in Tambon Huakoon, Nakhon Luang, Ayutthaya province. He started practicing Muay Thai at the age of 13 with his father and elder brother at the Sor Banchongsak training camp under the guidance of Banchong Ngarmket. According to the Thai tradition, his first fighting name was Dieselnoi Sor.Banchongsak, named in honor of his first gym. He made his Muay Thai debut in the 32 kg weight division. After 4–5 bouts, he changed camp and fought under the name of Dieselnoi Sor.Worakulchai at Sriracha, Chonburi. In 1977, he changed his name again and competed for the Sor.Thanikul camp, owned by Klaew Thanikul.

In 1981, Dieselnoi fought Koapong Sittichuchai and won the Lumpinee Stadium Lightweight (135 lbs) championship title. It was their third meeting after one knock out win each in their previous fights. Due to a lack of challengers he would remain idle for 15 months. His next fight was at the World Free-style Martial Arts Championship held in Bangkok, in April 1982, taking the 135 lb division in the finals against Shinobu Onuki from Japan. Then, on December 24, 1982, Dieselnoi fought Samart Payakaroon meeting at catch weight 132 lbs in a superfight. Dieselnoi weighed in at 129.7 to prove that he could have reached 130 lbs. He outscored the 1981 Fighter of the Year Samart with his trademark knee attacks. It was one of the biggest muaythai fights in 1980's with Samart taking a purse of 350,000 and Dieselnoi a purse of 400,000 baht, a record at the time. Dieselnoi was awarded the prestigious Sports Writer's 1982 Fighter of the Year Award. Dieselnoi reigned over the lightweight division for 17 more months without any challengers. On June 7 he faced Sagat Petchyindee at Rajadamnern Stadium at catch weight (132 lbs). It was again Dieselnoi's overpowering knee strikes that won him the bout. Then Dieselnoi would fly to America and face the American kickboxer John Moncayo, who was given a 5 kg advantage on the scale, in a modified rules fight (no elbows). Dieselnoi was victorious. When he returned to Thailand he then faced Sagat a second time, on October 6, 1984, in Ubon Ratchthani, winning on points again. Dieselnoi's final two fights were vs Krongsak Prakong-Boranrat. They would fight to a draw at Rajadamnern Stadium in Bangkok on August 8, 1985, and then Dieselnoi would beat him on points on November 12, 1985, at Lumpinee Stadium. Both fights at 132 lbs. After being the champion for four consecutive years, he was eventually stripped from his 135 lb Lumpinee title and forced to retire because there was nobody in the weight division left to contest the belt.

== Titles and accomplishments ==
- Lumpinee Stadium
  - 1981 Lumpinee Stadium Lightweight (135 lbs) Champion
- World Free-style Martial Arts
  - 1982 WFMA Lightweight (135 lbs) Champion
- Awards
  - 1982 Sports Writers Association of Thailand Fighter of the Year
  - 1982 Sports Writers Association of Thailand Fight of the Year (vs Samart Payakaroon)
  - 1984 Sports Writers Association of Thailand Fight of the Year (vs Sagat Petchyindee)
  - 1985 Sports Writers Association of Thailand Fight of the Year (vs Krongsak Na Theerawong)
  - Siam Kela Muay Thai Hall of Fame
  - Rajadamnern Stadium Hall of Fame

== Professional boxing record ==
| 1 fight | 0 wins | 1 loss |
|---|---|---|
| By knockout | 0 | 1 |

| No. | Result | Record | Opponent | Type | Round | Date | Location | Notes |
|---|---|---|---|---|---|---|---|---|
| 1 | Loss | 0–1 | (Thailand) Saengsakda Kittikasem | KO | 2 | August 4, 1981 | Lumpinee Stadium, Bangkok, Thailand | |

== Muay Thai record ==
Muay Thai Record
110 Wins, 5 Losses, 4 Draw
| Date | Result | Opponent | Event | Location | Method | Round | Time |
| 1985-11-12 | Win | (Thailand) Krongsak Na Theerawong | Lumpinee Stadium | Bangkok, Thailand | Decision | 5 | 3:00 |
Receives the Yodmuaythai trophy.
| 1985-08-08 | Draw | (Thailand) Krongsak Na Theerawong | Rajadamnern Stadium | Bangkok, Thailand | Decision | 5 | 3:00 |
| 1984-10-06 | Win | (Thailand) Sagat Petchyindee | | Isan, Thailand | Decision | 5 | 3:00 |
Receives the Yodmuaythai trophy.
| 1984-07-14 | Win | (United States) John Moncayo | Grand Olympic Auditorium | Los Angeles, United States | KO (Knees) | 3 | 0:40 |
| 1984-06-07 | Win | (Thailand) Sagat Petchyindee | Rajadamnern Stadium | Bangkok, Thailand | Decision | 5 | 3:00 |
| 1982-12-24 | Win | (Thailand) Samart Payakaroon | Rajadamnern Stadium | Bangkok, Thailand | Decision | 5 | 3:00 |
| 1982-04-28 | Win | (Japan) Shinobu Onuki | Rajadamnern Stadium - World Freestyle Martial Arts, Final | Bangkok, Thailand | KO (Knees) | 1 | 1:26 |
Wins WFMA World Lightweight (135 lbs) title.
| 1982-04-25 | Win | (South Korea) Lee Jae Yong | Rajadamnern Stadium - World Freestyle Martial Arts, Semifinals | Bangkok, Thailand | KO (Knee to the head) | 1 | |
| 1982-01-25 | Win | (Thailand) Padejsuk Pitsanurachan | | Bangkok, Thailand | Decision | 5 | 3:00 |
| 1981-09-18 | Win | (Thailand) Paennoi Sakornphitak | Lumpinee Stadium | Bangkok, Thailand | Decision | 5 | 3:00 |
| 1981-03-26 | Win | (Thailand) Raktae Muangsurin | Rajadamnern Stadium - Raja vs Lpn champion | Bangkok, Thailand | Decision | 5 | 3:00 |
| 1981-01-09 | Win | (Thailand) Kaopong Sitichuchai | Lumpinee Stadium | Bangkok, Thailand | Decision | 5 | 3:00 |
Wins the vacant Lumpinee Stadium Lightweight (135 lbs) title.
| 1980-09-26 | Loss | (Thailand) Kaopong Sitichuchai | Lumpinee Stadium | Bangkok, Thailand | KO (Punches) | 2 | |
| 1980-07-08 | Win | (Thailand) Kaopong Sitichuchai | Lumpinee Stadium | Bangkok, Thailand | KO (Knee to the head) | 3 | |
Receives the Yodmuaythai trophy.
| 1980-04-28 | Win | (Thailand) Padejsuk Pitsanurachan | Rajadamnern Stadium | Bangkok, Thailand | Decision | 5 | 3:00 |
| 1980-03-05 | Win | (Thailand) Paennoi Sakornphitak | Rajadamnern Stadium | Bangkok, Thailand | Decision | 5 | 3:00 |
| 1980-01-22 | Win | (Thailand) Wichannoi Porntawee | Lumpinee Stadium | Bangkok, Thailand | Decision | 5 | 3:00 |
Receives the Yodmuaythai trophy.
| 1979-10-09 | Win | (Thailand) Posai Sitiboonlert | Lumpinee Stadium | Bangkok, Thailand | Decision | 5 | 3:00 |
| 1979-08-02 | Loss | (Thailand) Prawit Sritham | Rajadamnern Stadium | Bangkok, Thailand | Decision | 5 | 3:00 |
| 1979-06-26 | Win | (Thailand) Khaosod Sitpraprom | Lumpinee Stadium | Bangkok, Thailand | Decision | 5 | 3:00 |
| 1979-03-01 | Loss | (Thailand) Padejsuk Pitsanurachan | Rajadamnern Stadium | Bangkok, Thailand | TKO (Doctor Stoppage) | 4 | |
| 1979-01-17 | Loss | (Thailand) Wichannoi Porntawee | Rajadamnern Stadium | Bangkok, Thailand | Decision | 5 | 3:00 |
| 1978-12-06 | Win | (Thailand) Narongnoi Kiatbandit | Rajadamnern Stadium | Bangkok, Thailand | Decision | 5 | 3:00 |
| 1978-10-12 | Loss | (Thailand) Wichannoi Porntawee | Rajadamnern Stadium | Bangkok, Thailand | Decision | 5 | 3:00 |
For the Yodmuaythai trophy.
| 1978-07-31 | Win | (Thailand) Nongkhai Sor.Prapatsorn | Rajadamnern Stadium | Bangkok, Thailand | Decision | 5 | 3:00 |
| 1978-06-21 | Win | (Thailand) Tawanook Sitpoonchai | Rajadamnern Stadium | Bangkok, Thailand | Decision | 5 | 3:00 |
| 1978-05-04 | Win | (Thailand) Fahkaew Surakorsrang | Rajadamnern Stadium | Bangkok, Thailand | Decision | 5 | 3:00 |
| 1978-02-27 | Win | (Thailand) Singnum Phetanin | Rajadamnern Stadium | Bangkok, Thailand | Decision | 5 | 3:00 |
| 1978-01- | Win | (Thailand) Saknarongnoi Chor Chutirat | Rajadamnern Stadium | Bangkok, Thailand | Decision | 5 | 3:00 |
| 1977-12-09 | Win | (Thailand) Paruhat Loh-ngoen | Rajadamnern Stadium | Bangkok, Thailand | Decision | 5 | 3:00 |
| 1977-10-18 | Win | (Thailand) Kingthong Sakornpitak | Lumpinee Stadium | Bangkok, Thailand | Decision | 5 | 3:00 |
| 1977- | Win | (Thailand) Daotong Sityodtong | Lumpinee Stadium | Bangkok, Thailand | Decision | 5 | 3:00 |
| 1977-04-21 | Win | (Thailand) Noklek Singtaongsak | Sirimongkol, Lumpinee Stadium | Bangkok, Thailand | Decision | 5 | 3:00 |
| 1977- | Win | (Thailand) Phansuknoi Kwinchumphae | Lumpinee Stadium | Bangkok, Thailand | Decision | 5 | 3:00 |
| 1977- | Win | (Thailand) Pichit Kweangmichai | Lumpinee Stadium | Bangkok, Thailand | Decision | 5 | 3:00 |
| 1977- | Win | (Thailand) Numraman Sitmuhamat | Lumpinee Stadium | Bangkok, Thailand | Decision | 5 | 3:00 |
| 1977- | Win | (Thailand) Chatchanoi Phasingkamran | | Thailand | Decision | 5 | 3:00 |
| 1976- | Win | (Thailand) Supernoi Kiatchainairong | | Bangkok, Thailand | Decision | 5 | 3:00 |
| 1976-10-05 | Win | (Thailand) Piti Muangkhonkaen | Lumpinee Stadium | Bangkok, Thailand | Disqualification | 4 | |
| 1976- | Win | (Thailand) Dechai Koyrungruang | | Bangkok, Thailand | Decision | 5 | 3:00 |
| 1976-08-30 | Win | (Thailand) Panoi Sor Kochasit | Rajadamnern Stadium | Bangkok, Thailand | Decision | 5 | 3:00 |
| 1976- | Win | (Thailand) Paennoi Sakornpitak | Rajadamnern Stadium | Bangkok, Thailand | Decision | 5 | 3:00 |
| 1976- | Win | (Thailand) Fanoy Saksaendee | Rajadamnern Stadium | Bangkok, Thailand | Decision | 5 | 3:00 |
Dieselnoi's first fight in Bangkok. 100 lbs
Legend: Win Loss Draw/No contest Notes

== See also ==
- List of male kickboxers
