= Raktae Muangsurin =

Thai former professional Muay Thai fighter

- Born: Boontham Thoykrathoke; February 8, 1960 (age 66); Mueang Chaiyaphum, Thailand
- Nickname: Exploding Hell Puncher (หมัดนรกแตก)
- Height: 1.77 m (5 ft 10 in)
- Division: Lightweight
- Style: Muay Thai (Muay Mat)
- Stance: Orthodox
- Team: Muangsurin

Other information
- Spouse: Amornrat Rakwanich

Boontham Thoykrathoke (born February 8, 1960), known professionally as Raktae Muangsurin (Thai: รักแท้ เมืองสุรินทร์), is a Thai former professional Muay Thai fighter. He is a former Rajadamnern Stadium Lightweight Champion who was famous during the 1970s and 1980s.

He trained at the Muangsurin gym, a camp that produced many elite pressure fighters such as Saensak Muangsurin and Samransak Muangsurin.

== Biography and career ==
Raktae started training Muay Thai at the age of 14 under Somwang Uttamaphan. During this time, he adopted the ring name of Sianbo Sunkila Ladyai (which translates to "Sianbo Ladyai Sports Center" as they were his sponsor). The Ladyai Sports Center also served as the venue of his first Muay Thai fight when he was 15. He fought in Chaiyaphum, Khon Kaen, and Mara Sarakham, incurring 30 fights until he was considered a top fighter. During this time, he was a skilled Muay Khao (knee fighter).

At the age of 17, he moved to Bangkok to join the Muangsurin gym in 1977. He would become a Muay Mat fighter like majority of other fighters in the gym. Initially, he adopted the ring name of "Raksak Muangsurin" but fight venue officials incorrectly printed his name as "Raktae". He later officially changed his ring name to Raktae which translates to "true love", in reference to his love for his wife Amornrat Rakwanich, the daughter of the Muangsurin gym owner.

Raktae's prime lasted from 1978 to 1986. He quickly rose to prominence during this time, winning the Rajadamnern Stadium 135 lbs title in 1979 by defeating his most difficult opponent, Yousop Sor. Thanikul, by decision. He holds victories over many notable champions of his era such as Jocky Sitkanpai (KO), Jitti Muangkhonkaen (KO), Seksan Sor. Theppitak (KO), Inseenoi Sor. Thanikul and Changpuek Kiatsongrit (KO).

Raktae was one of the most recognizable fighters of the 1980s on the Bangkok circuit with his pressuring punching style which means that he is called a "Muay Mat" in Thai. In particular, his powerful right hand that earned him surprise KO victories resulted in the nickname "Ay Mat Narok Taek" which translates to "The Exploding Hell Puncher". His highest purse was 100,000 baht which was in the range of purses given to the elite Thai fighters during the 1980s. His preferred techniques were punching, elbow usage, and knee fighting.

Raktae also competed in both professional and amateur boxing. He won the now defunct OBA lightweight title and was the runner up at the President's Cup in Indonesia. After taking a hiatus from Muay Thai for several years, he was matched up against "The Rising Star From Australia" John Wayne Parr in his comeback fight. Raktae raised his hand in the 3rd round, retiring from the fight due to Parr's low kicks. Raktae would permanently retire from Muay Thai competition afterwards. His KO victories against Jockey Sitkanpai and Jitti Kiatsuriya were considered his best fights. He was matched up against Komtae Chor.Suananant but they did not fight.

During his several-year hiatus, Raktae became a trainer at the Muangsurin gym where he was viewed as the gym's headman. He would become the trainer other elite pressure fighters such as Muay Mat fighter Panphet Muangsurin, Pornsak Muangsurin or the well-rounded Muay Bouk fighter Den Muangsurin. He worked as a trainer in the Muangsurin gym for seven years before he and Amornrat decided to close down the camp. Canadian former fighter Mike Miles recalls that while he was training in the Muangsurin gym in 1992, Raktae and Amornrat welcomed him and treated him with hospitality.

Later on in his life, Raktae opened a spare auto parts shop in his new hometown of Khlong Sam Wa district in Bangkok. In his house located in the middle of a foliage-filled field, he has twin daughters by the names of Alisa and Ariya and a youngest son named Rondol. He travels regularly and attends gatherings with former Muay Thai fighters.

== Titles and accomplishments ==
- Rajadamnern Stadium
  - 1979 Rajadamnern Stadium Lightweight (135 lbs) Champion (2 defenses)

== Professional boxing record ==
2 fights	1 win	1 loss
By knockout	1	1

No.	Result	Record	Opponent	Type	Round	Date	Location	Notes
2	Loss	1–1	(Japan) Tetsuya Sakiyama	KO		1982		
1	Win	1–0	(Japan) Takashi Fujimoto	KO	1	Jul 12 1981	Channel 7 Boxing Stadium, Bangkok, Thailand	Won the OBA Lightweight title.

== Muay Thai record ==
Muay Thai Record
Date	Result	Opponent	Event	Location	Method	Round	Time
1997–03-15	Loss	(Australia) John Wayne Parr		Satun province, Thailand	TKO (retirement/low kicks)	3	
1988-04-02	Loss	(Thailand) Sagat Petchyindee	WKA Ikki Kajiwara Memorial Show '88	Tokyo, Japan	KO (Punches)	3	
1987-11-28	Win	(Thailand) Tantawannoi Sit Silachai	Omnoi Stadium	Samut Sakhon, Thailand	Decision	5	3:00
1987-07-11		(Thailand) Singnum Sit Omnoi	MAJKF	Tokyo, Japan			
1987–	Loss	(Thailand) Singnum Sit Omnoi	Rangsit Stadium	Pathum Thani, Thailand	Decision	5	3:00
1987-03-20	Loss	(Thailand) Changpuek Kiatsongrit	Rangsit Stadium	Pathum Thani, Thailand	Decision	5	3:00
For the vacant Lumpinee Stadium Super Lightweight (140 lbs) title.
1986-11-29	Loss	(Thailand) Sagat Petchyindee		Tokyo, Japan	KO (punches)	2	
1986-10-31	Win	(Thailand) Chanwit Noisakwittaya	Rangsit Stadium	Pathum Thani, Thailand	Decision	5	3:00
1986-09-26	Loss	(Thailand) Singnum Sit Omnoi	Rangsit Stadium	Pathum Thani, Thailand	Decision	5	3:00
1986-08-08	Win	(Thailand) Changpuek Kiatsongrit	Rangsit Stadium	Pathum Thani, Thailand	KO (Right cross)	3	
1986-07-04	Win	(Thailand) Mongkolkaew Sitchang	Rangsit Stadium	Pathum Thani, Thailand	Decision	5	3:00
1985-06-15	Loss	(Thailand) Saensatharn Saengrit	Samrong Stadium	Bangkok, Thailand	KO (Punch + head kick)	2	
1985-05-31	Loss	(Thailand) Thong Lukbansuan	Lumpinee Stadium	Bangkok, Thailand	Decision	5	3:00
1984-05-31	Loss	(Thailand) Somsong Kiathoranee	Rajadamnern Stadium	Bangkok, Thailand	Decision	5	3:00
1983-11-03	Loss	(Thailand) Mangkon Kiewsitchang	Rajadamnern Stadium	Bangkok, Thailand	Decision	5	3:00
1983-08-29	Loss	(Thailand) Krongsak Sakkasem	Rajadamnern Stadium	Bangkok, Thailand	Decision	5	3:00
1983–	Loss	(Thailand) Rakchai Hapalang	Omnoi Stadium	Samut Sakhon, Thailand	KO (Punches)	4	
1983-04-23	Win	(United States) Ricardo O'Crane	WKA	Los Angeles, US	KO	2	
1983-01-17	Win	(Thailand) Jitti Muangkhonkaen	Rajadamnern Stadium	Bangkok, Thailand	Decision	5	3:00
1982-12-08	Loss	(Thailand) Inseenoi Sor.Thanikul	Rajadamnern Stadium	Bangkok, Thailand	Decision	5	3:00
Loses the Rajadamnern Stadium Lightweight (135 lbs) title.
1982-09-28	Loss	(Thailand) Sagat Petchyindee	Lumpinee Stadium	Bangkok, Thailand	TKO (Punches)	2	
1982-08-25	Win	(Thailand) Seksan Sor.Thepphithak	Rajadamnern Stadium	Bangkok, Thailand	KO (Punches)	2	
1982-08-03	Loss	(Thailand) Ruengsak Porntawee		Bangkok, Thailand	Decision	5	3:00
1982-07-15	Win	(Thailand) Inseenoi Sor.Thanikul	Rajadamnern Stadium	Bangkok, Thailand	Decision	5	3:00
1982-04-02	Loss	(Thailand) Paennoi Sakornphitak	Lumpinee Stadium	Bangkok, Thailand	Decision	5	3:00
1981-12-09	Win	(Thailand) Lakchart Sor.Prasatporn		Bangkok, Thailand	KO	4	
1981-10-30	Loss	(Thailand) Nongkhai Sor.Prapatsorn	Lumpinee Stadium	Bangkok, Thailand	Decision	5	3:00
1981-03-26	Loss	(Thailand) Dieselnoi Chor Thanasukarn	Rajadamnern Stadium – Raja vs Lpn champion	Bangkok, Thailand	Decision	5	3:00
1981-02-05	Win	(Thailand) Yousop Sor.Thanikul	Rajadamnern Stadium	Bangkok, Thailand	TKO (Punches)	4	
Defends the Rajadamnern Stadium Lightweight (135 lbs) title.
1980-11-27	Win	(Thailand) Seksan Sor Theppitak	Rajadamnern Stadium	Bangkok, Thailand	Decision	5	3:00
Defends the Rajadamnern Stadium Lightweight (135 lbs) title.
1980-11-03	Win	(Thailand) Nuasila Na Bankod	Rajadamnern Stadium	Bangkok, Thailand	KO (Punches)	1	
1980-08-25	Loss	(Thailand) Nongkhai Sor.Prapatsorn	Rajadamnern Stadium	Bangkok, Thailand	KO	4	
1980-07-30	Win	(Thailand) Jocky Sitkanpai	Rajadamnern Stadium	Bangkok, Thailand	KO	2	
1980-07-03	Loss	(Thailand) Padejsuk Pitsanurachan	Rajadamnern Stadium	Bangkok, Thailand	Decision	5	3:00
1980-05-22	Win	(Thailand) Jitti Muangkhonkaen	Rajadamnern Stadium	Bangkok, Thailand	KO (Punches)	1	
1980-03-05	Win	(Thailand) Tawanok Sitpoonchai	Rajadamnern Stadium	Bangkok, Thailand	KO	4	
1980-01-22	Loss	(Thailand) Kaopong Sitchuchai	Lumpinee Stadium	Bangkok, Thailand	TKO	3	
1979-10-29	Win	(Thailand) Tawanok Sitpoonchai	Rajadamnern Stadium	Bangkok, Thailand	KO (Punches)	4	
1979-09-06	Win	(Thailand) Yousop Sor.Thanikul	Rajadamnern Stadium	Bangkok, Thailand	Decision	5	3:00
Wins the vacant Rajadamnern Stadium Lightweight (135 lbs) title.
1979-07-27	Win	(Thailand) Jocky Sitkanpai	Lumpinee Stadium	Bangkok, Thailand	KO	2	
1979-07-02	Win	(Thailand) Santisuk Srisothon	Lumpinee Stadium	Bangkok, Thailand	KO	2	
1979-05-16	Loss	(Thailand) Det Fairtex		Bangkok, Thailand	Decision	5	3:00
1979-04-05	Loss	(Thailand) Samersing Tianhiran		Bangkok, Thailand	Decision	5	3:00
1979-01-17	Loss	(Thailand) Prawit Sritham	Rajadamnern Stadium	Bangkok, Thailand	Decision	5	3:00
1978-05-06	Win	(Thailand) Tham Sit Por Daeng	Netrnoi Sor.Vorasing vs Freddy Castillo, Royal Thai Army Stadium	Bangkok, Thailand	Decision	5	3:00
1978-04-10	Loss	(Thailand) Tham Sit Por Daeng	Rajadamnern Stadium	Bangkok, Thailand	Decision	5	3:00
1977-09-15	Win	(Thailand) Daojaratnoi Singmuanglop		Bangkok, Thailand	Decision	5	3:00
Legend: Win Loss Draw/No contest Notes
