= Kengkaj Kiatkriangkrai =

Thai former professional Muay Thai fighter

- Born: Abdullae Tisa; March 2, 1957 (age 69); Laem Ngop district, Trat province, Thailand
- Nickname: 5K
- Division: Light Flyweight; Flyweight; Super Flyweight; Bantamweight; Super Bantamweight; Featherweight; Super Featherweight
- Style: Muay Thai
- Stance: Southpaw
- Team: Kiatkriangkrai

Other information
- Notable relatives: Kengkla Sitsei (brother)

Abdullae Tisa (Thai: อับดุลย์เลาะ ทิศา), known professionally as Kengkaj Kiatkriangkrai (Thai: เก่งกาจ เกียรติเกรียงไกร), is a Thai former professional Muay Thai fighter.

== Biography and career ==
Abdullae Tisa was born on March 2, 1957, in the Trat province of Thailand in a muslim family. He started training in Muay Thai alongside his brother who became a Rajadamnern Stadium under the name Kengkla Sitsei.

Fighting under the ring name of "Kengkaj Kiatkriangkrai" he became a renowned fighter of the Bangkok circuit during the second half of the 1970s. He captured three Rajadamnern Stadium titles in the 112, 118 and 130 lbs divisions and defeated many notable of his era such as Paruhat Loh-ngern, Padejsuk Pitsanurachan, Ruengsak Porntawee, Narongnoi Kiatbandit, Saengsakda Kittikasem, and Khaosod Sitpraprom.

On August 14, 1980, Kengkaj faced Muay Thai legend Wichannoi Porntawee for what would be Wichannoi's final bout. Kengkaj won the fight by decision.

Kengkaj retired from Muay competition in 1984 after a defeat to Komtae Chor.Suananan. He stayed involved in Muay Thai and as a local promotor in his native Trat province.

In March 2022, Kengkaj was invited to receive a prize from the hands of the Bangkok governor for his contribution to the Muay Thai world alongside 60 other former fighters as part of the "Bangkok, capital of the Muay Thai world" project.

== Titles and accomplishments ==
- Rajadamnern Stadium
  - 1976 Rajadamnern Stadium Flyweight (112 lbs) Champion
  - 1978 Rajadamnern Stadium Bantamweight (118 lbs) Champion
  - 1982 Rajadamnern Stadium Super Featherweight (130 lbs) Champion

== Fight record ==
Muay Thai Record
Date	Result	Opponent	Event	Location	Method	Round	Time
1984-10-22	Loss	(Thailand) Komtae Chor.Suananant	Wan Muay Thai, Rajadamnern Stadium	Bangkok, Thailand	KO	5	
1984-08-23	Loss	(Thailand) Ratchabut Sor.Thanikul	Mumnangoen, Rajadamnern Stadium	Bangkok, Thailand	Decision	5	3:00
1984-07-26	Loss	(Thailand) Ratchabut Sor.Thanikul	Mumnangoen, Rajadamnern Stadium	Bangkok, Thailand	Decision	5	3:00
1984-03-22	Win	(Thailand) Kulabkhao Na Nontachai	Mumnangoen, Rajadamnern Stadium	Bangkok, Thailand	Decision	5	3:00
1984-02-29	Loss	(Thailand) Kulabkhao Na Nontachai	Mumnangoen, Rajadamnern Stadium	Bangkok, Thailand	Decision	5	3:00
1983-11-14	Loss	(Thailand) Lom-Isan Sor.Thanikul	Rajadamnern Stadium	Bangkok, Thailand	Decision	5	3:00
1983-07-28	Loss	(Thailand) Lom-Isan Sor.Thanikul	Wan Muay Thai, Rajadamnern Stadium	Bangkok, Thailand	Decision	5	3:00
1983-04-21	Loss	(Thailand) Kitti Sor.Thanikul	Mumnangoen, Rajadamnern Stadium	Bangkok, Thailand	Decision	5	3:00
1982-10-25	Loss	(Thailand) Samingnoom Sithiboontham	Rajadamnern Stadium	Bangkok, Thailand	Decision	5	3:00
1982-08-25	Win	(Thailand) Jock Kiatniwat	Wan Muay Thai, Rajadamnern Stadium	Bangkok, Thailand	Decision (Unanimous)	5	3:00
Wins the vacant Rajadamnern Stadium Super Featherweight (130 lbs) title.
1982-07-19	Win	(Thailand) Khaosod Sitpraprom	Rajadamnern Stadium	Bangkok, Thailand	Decision	5	3:00
1982-04-22	Win	(Thailand) Singpathom Phongsurakan	Wan Muay Thai, Rajadamnern Stadium	Bangkok, Thailand	Decision	5	3:00
1982-02-11	Loss	(Thailand) Ruengsak Porntawee	Mumnangoen, Rajadamnern Stadium	Bangkok, Thailand	Decision	5	3:00
1981-11-13	Win	(Thailand) Saengsakda Kittikasem	Fairtex, Lumpinee Stadium	Bangkok, Thailand	Decision	5	3:00
1981-09-28	Win	(Thailand) Narongnoi Kiatbandit	Phettongkam, Rajadamnern Stadium	Bangkok, Thailand	Decision	5	3:00
1981-08-27	Win	(Thailand) Fanta Phetmuangtrat	Insee Phungadfa, Rajadamnern Stadium	Bangkok, Thailand	Decision	5	3:00
1981-07-20	Win	(Thailand) Ruengsak Porntawee	Rajadamnern Stadium	Bangkok, Thailand	Decision	5	3:00
1981-04-29	Win	(Thailand) Fanta Pornpisanu	Mumnamgoen, Rajadamnern Stadium	Bangkok, Thailand	Decision	5	3:00
1981-03-26	Loss	(Thailand) Khaosod Sitpraprom	Mumnamgoen, Rajadamnern Stadium	Bangkok, Thailand	Decision	5	3:00
1981-?	Win	(Mexico) Eddie Naguza	Rajadamnern Stadium	Bangkok, Thailand	KO (Knees)	1	
1980-12-25	Loss	(Thailand) Narongnoi Kiatbandit	Mumnamgoen, Rajadamnern Stadium	Bangkok, Thailand	Decision	5	3:00
1980-11-13	Loss	(Thailand) Padejsuk Pitsanurachan	Mumnamgoen, Rajadamnern Stadium	Bangkok, Thailand	Decision	5	3:00
1980-08-14	Win	(Thailand) Wichannoi Porntawee	Mumnamgoen, Rajadamnern Stadium	Bangkok, Thailand	Decision	5	3:00
1980-07-03	Win	(Thailand) Narongnoi Kiatbandit	Mumnamgoen, Rajadamnern Stadium	Bangkok, Thailand	Decision	5	3:00
1980-02-20	Loss	(Thailand) Jitti Muangkhonkaen	Phettongkam, Rajadamnern Stadium	Bangkok, Thailand	Decision	5	3:00
1979-12-27	Loss	(Thailand) Paennoi Sakornpitak	Mumnamgoen, Rajadamnern Stadium	Bangkok, Thailand	Decision	5	3:00
1979-11-22	Win	(Thailand) Ruengsak Porntawee	Mumnamgoen, Rajadamnern Stadium	Bangkok, Thailand	Decision	5	3:00
1979-09-18		(Thailand) Seksan Sor.Theppitak	Mumnamgoen, Rajadamnern Stadium	Bangkok, Thailand			
1979-08-23	Loss	(Thailand) Ruengsak Porntawee	Chum Tang, Rajadamnern Stadium	Bangkok, Thailand	Decision	5	3:00
1979-01-17	Loss	(Thailand) Ruengsak Porntawee	Royal Ceremony Show, Rajadamnern Stadium	Bangkok, Thailand	Decision	5	3:00
1978-11-23	Loss	(Thailand) Seksan Sor.Theppitak	Mumnamgoen, Rajadamnern Stadium	Bangkok, Thailand	Decision	5	3:00
1978-08-28	Loss	(Thailand) Narongnoi Kiatbandit	Mumnamgoen, Rajadamnern Stadium	Bangkok, Thailand	Decision	5	3:00
1978-	Loss	(Thailand) Paennoi Sakornpitak		Bangkok, Thailand	Decision	5	3:00
1978-05-04	NC	(Thailand) Jitti Muangkhonkaen	Rajadamnern Stadium	Bangkok, Thailand	Ref.stop. (Jitti dismissed)	5	
1978-03-29	NC	(Thailand) Jocky Sitkanpai	Palangnum, Rajadamnern Stadium	Bangkok, Thailand	Ref.stop. (Jocky dismissed)	5	
1978-01-18	Win	(Thailand) Singnum Ekkachai	Palangnum, Rajadamnern Stadium	Bangkok, Thailand	Decision	5	3:00
Wins the Rajadamnern Stadium Bantamweight (118 lbs) title.
1977-10-31	Win	(Thailand) Ruanpae Sitwatnang		Bangkok, Thailand	Decision	5	3:00
1977-08-	Loss	(Thailand) Sagat Petchyindee	Rajadamnern Stadium	Bangkok, Thailand	Decision	5	3:00
1977-07-06	Loss	(Thailand) Nanfah Siharatdecho	Mumnamgoen, Rajadamnern Stadium	Bangkok, Thailand	Decision	5	3:00
1977-06-02	Loss	(Thailand) Padejsuk Pitsanurachan	Rajadamnern Stadium	Bangkok, Thailand	Decision	5	3:00
1977-03-31	Win	(Thailand) Padejsuk Pitsanurachan	Mumnamgoen, Rajadamnern Stadium	Bangkok, Thailand	Decision	5	3:00
1977-02-24	Loss	(Thailand) Samersing Tianhiran	Mumnamgoen, Rajadamnern Stadium	Bangkok, Thailand	Decision	5	3:00
1977-01-27	Loss	(Thailand) Sagat Petchyindee		Bangkok, Thailand	Decision	5	3:00
1976-12-07	Win	(Thailand) Paruhat Loh-ngern	Lumpinee Stadium Anniversary Show	Bangkok, Thailand	Decision	5	3:00
1976-07-15	Win	(Thailand) Numtanong Suanmiskwan	Mumnamgoen, Rajadamnern Stadium	Bangkok, Thailand	Decision	5	3:00
Wins the Rajadamnern Stadium Flyweight (112 lbs) title.
1976-05-27	Win	(Thailand) Petchnamnueng Mongkolpitak	Mumnamgoen, Rajadamnern Stadium	Bangkok, Thailand	Decision	5	3:00
1976-05-06	Loss	(Thailand) Paruhat Loh-ngern	Mumnamgoen, Rajadamnern Stadium	Bangkok, Thailand	Decision	5	3:00
1976-01-13	Win	(Thailand) Nanfah Siharatdecho	Sirimongkol, Lumpinee Stadium	Bangkok, Thailand	Decision	5	3:00
1975-10-29	Win	(Thailand) Saengdao Sakprasert	Mumnamgoen, Rajadamnern Stadium	Bangkok, Thailand	Decision	5	3:00
1975-09-02	Win	(Thailand) Chakkrathep Sitpanthiang	M-Bandit, Lumpinee Stadium	Bangkok, Thailand	Decision	5	3:00
1975-05-22	Win	(Thailand) Rungsayam Sor.Walaiporn	Mumnamgoen, Rajadamnern Stadium	Bangkok, Thailand	Decision	5	3:00
1975-02-27	Win	(Thailand) Sakchan Porntawee	Thai Chue Thai, Rajadamnern Stadium	Bangkok, Thailand	Decision	5	3:00
1974-12-13	Win	(Thailand) Ratchawat Sitampon	M-Fight, Lumpinee Stadium	Bangkok, Thailand	Decision	5	3:00
Legend: Win Loss Draw/No contest Notes
