= Veerachat Saturngrum =

Thai boxer

- Born: 4 February 1957; Mueang Buriram district, Buriram province, Thailand
- Died: 21 November 1991 (aged 34); Los Angeles, USA
- Nickname: Lot
- Height: 170 cm (5 ft 7 in)
- Division: Flyweight; Super Flyweight; Bantamweight; Super Bantamweight
- Style: Boxing, Muay Thai
- Stance: Orthodox

Other information
- Occupation: Royal Thai Air Force soldier Muay Thai trainer
- Boxing record from BoxRec

Veerachat Saturngrum (Thai: วีระชาติ สะเทิ้งรัมย์) (4 February 1957 – 21 November 1991), also known as Nanfah Siharatdecho (Thai: น่านฟ้า สีหราชเดโช) was a Thai boxer and Muay Thai fighter. He competed in the men's bantamweight event at the 1976 Summer Olympics.

== Biography and career ==
=== Amateur boxing ===
Saturngrum made the Thai national boxing team for the 1976 Olympics in Montreal, Canada. Competing in the bantamweight division, he received a bye in the first round, defeated Kemal Solunur from Turkey on 20 July 1976 and in the third round defeated Chris Eus from Canada on 24 July 1976. In the quarterfinals, he lost to Gu Yong Jo from North Korea on 27 July 1976.

In 1978 Saturngtum participated in the 1978 World Amateur Boxing Championships where he would be eliminated in the first round by Viktor Rybakov.

=== Death ===
Saturngrum died of a heart attack on 21 November 1991, in Los Angeles.

== Titles and accomplishments ==
=== Amateur Boxing ===
- King's Cup
  - 1977 King's Cup -54 kg (gold)
  - 1978 King's Cup -57 kg (gold)
  - 1979 King's Cup -57 kg (bronze)
- Southeast Asian Games
  - 1981 SEA Games -57 kg (bronze)

=== Muay Thai ===
- Rajadamnern Stadium
  - 1977 Rajadamnern Stadium Bantamweight (118 lbs) Champion
    - One successful title defense

== Muay Thai record ==
Muay Thai Record
Date	Result	Opponent	Event	Location	Method	Round	Time
1979-08-02	Loss	(Thailand) Thongsak Sitpordaeng	Rajadamnern Stadium	Bangkok, Thailand	KO	3	
1979-02-08	Win	(Thailand) Chanchai BurapaMusic	Rajadamnern Stadium	Bangkok, Thailand	Decision	5	3:00
1978-10-20	Win	(Thailand) Kamlaiyok Kiatsompop	Lumpinee Stadium	Bangkok, Thailand	KO (Punch)	4	
1978-08-07	Win	(Thailand) Dennarong Saksaendee	Rajadamnern Stadium	Bangkok, Thailand	Decision	5	3:00
1978-06-13	Loss	(Thailand) Kaopong Sitichuchai	Lumpinee Stadium	Bangkok, Thailand	KO	4	
1978-03-08	Win	(Thailand) Man Sahathai	Rajadamnern Stadium	Bangkok, Thailand	Decision	5	3:00
1977-09-22	Win	(Thailand) Tawanook Sitpoonchai	Rajadamnern Stadium	Bangkok, Thailand	Decision	5	3:00
Defends the Rajadamnern Stadium Bantamweight (118 lbs) title.
1977-08-04	NC	(Thailand) Saengsakda Kittikasem	Rajadamnern Stadium	Bangkok, Thailand	Ref stop. (Saengsakda dismissed)	4	
1977-07-06	Win	(Thailand) Kengkaj Kiatkriangkrai	Mumnamgoen, Rajadamnern Stadium	Bangkok, Thailand	Decision	5	3:00
1977-04-28	Loss	(Thailand) Padejsuk Pitsanurachan	Mumnamgoen, Rajadamnern Stadium	Bangkok, Thailand	Decision	5	3:00
1977-02-24	Win	(Thailand) Raklek Chutinawee	Rajadamnern Stadium	Bangkok, Thailand	Decision	5	3:00
Wins the Rajadamnern Stadium Bantamweight (118 lbs) title.
1977-02-04	Loss	(Thailand) Padejsuk Pitsanurachan	Lumpinee Stadium	Bangkok, Thailand	Decision	5	3:00
1976-09-27	Win	(Thailand) Singnum Petchthanin	Rajadamnern Stadium	Bangkok, Thailand	Decision	5	3:00
1976-08-26	Win	(Thailand) Rueankaew Sor.Prasit	Mumnamgoen, Rajadamnern Stadium	Bangkok, Thailand	Decision	5	3:00
1976-06-16	Win	(Thailand) Petchnamnueng Mongkolpitak	Petchsiam, Rajadamnern Stadium	Bangkok, Thailand	Decision	5	3:00
1976-05-27	Win	(Thailand) Siharat Sor.Prateep	Mumnamgoen, Rajadamnern Stadium	Bangkok, Thailand	TKO	4	
1976-05-04	Win	(Thailand) Thanuthong Kiatmuangtai	Sirimongkol, Rajadamnern Stadium	Bangkok, Thailand	KO	2	
1976-03-10	Win	(Thailand) Thanuphit Sit Sor.Wor.	Rajadamnern Stadium	Bangkok, Thailand	Decision	5	3:00
1976-01-30	Win	(Thailand) Matjurat Lukkhaotakiab	Rodolfo Martínez vs Venice Borkhorsor, Huamark Stadium	Bangkok, Thailand	Decision	5	3:00
1976-01-13	Loss	(Thailand) Kengkaj Kiatkriangkrai	Sirimongkol, Lumpinee Stadium	Bangkok, Thailand	Decision	5	3:00
1975-06-02	Win	(Thailand) Muangchai Sakthuanchai	Rajadamnern Stadium	Bangkok, Thailand	Decision	5	3:00
1975-05-08	Win	(Thailand) Thanomjit Lukyapao	Rajadamnern Stadium	Bangkok, Thailand	Decision	5	3:00
1975-03-26	Win	(Thailand) Rueanthai Sitwiroj	Rajadamnern Stadium	Bangkok, Thailand	KO	5	
1975-02-25	Win	(Thailand) Dithisud Davy	Rajadamnern Stadium	Bangkok, Thailand	Decision	5	3:00
1974-11-21	Win	(Thailand) Khuntod Sitwetawan	Rajadamnern Stadium	Bangkok, Thailand	Decision	5	3:00
1974-10-21	Win	(Thailand) Dechsayam Singmuanglop	Rajadamnern Stadium	Bangkok, Thailand	Decision	5	3:00
Legend: Win Loss Draw/No contest Notes
