= Nongkhai Sor.Prapatsorn =

Thai professional Muay Thai fighter (1954–2021)

- Nongkhai in the 1980s
- Born: Udom Suwaraphan; August 31, 1954; Mueang Nong Khai, Nong Khai, Thailand
- Died: August 11, 2021 (aged 66)
- Native name: อุดม สุวรพันธ์
- Other names: Nongkhai Amornrat (หนองคาย อมรรัตน์)
- Nickname: Left Kick of the Mekong River (แข้งซ้ายลุ่มน้ำโขง)
- Height: 173 cm (5 ft 8 in)
- Division: Featherweight; Super Featherweight; Lightweight
- Style: Muay Thai (Muay Tae)
- Stance: Southpaw
- Years active: c. 1966–1982

Udom Suwaraphan (Thai: อุดม สุวรพันธ์; August 31, 1954 – August 11, 2021), known professionally as Nongkhai Sor.Prapatsorn (Thai: หนองคาย ส.ประภัสสร), was a Thai Muay Thai fighter. He was a two-division Rajadamnern Stadium champion, as well as the 1980 Fighter of the Year, who was famous during the 1970s and 1980s.

== Early life ==
Udom Suwaraphan, was born on August 31, 1954, in Mueang Nong Khai district, Nong Khai Province. He started practicing Muay Thai in at the age of 12 with his brothers in a camp close to his home. He competed over 100 times in the provinces until he was brought to Bangkok, training at the Amornrat camp.

== Career ==
Nongkhai won his Lumpinee Stadium debut by knockout in the second round but later lost on points at Rajadamnern Stadium which led him to return to the northeastern region for 2 years using the ring name "Nongkhai Amornrat" (หนองคาย อมรรัตน์).

During the year 1973 Nongkhai started using the name Sor.Prapatsorn after his camp fusionned with another one and formed the Sor.Prapatsorn camp in Bangkok.

1974 was the breakout year for Nongkhai in January he beat a Kung Fu specialist by knockout in the first round, this fight brought a lot of attention and Nongkhai went on a 9 fights winning streak before losing to Ruengsak Porntawee.

During the second half of 1970s Nongkhai fought the best fighters of his era and registered notable wins against Samersing Tianhirun, Khunponnoi Kiatsuriya, Jitti Kiatsuriya, Narongnoi Kiatbandit, Sagat Petchyindee, Vicharnnoi Porntawee, Pudpadnoi Worawut, Kaopong Sitichuchai, Ruengsak Porntawee, Padejsuk Pitsanurachan

At the peak of his career he received purses of 250,000 baht. Nongkhai was a two weight Rajadamnern Stadium champion at 126 and 130 lbs. He was chosen as the 130 lbs Thai representant for the World Martial Fesstyle Championship of 1982 in which he won the belt by knocking out his Japanese opponent, Kunimasa Nagae, in the final.

== Death ==
Nongkhai Sor.Prapatsorn died on August 11, 2021, from a stroke after a long disease.

== Titles and accomplishments ==
- Rajadamnern Stadium
  - 1976 Rajadamnern Stadium Featherweight (126 lbs) Champion
    - Four successful title defenses
  - 1981 Rajadamnern Stadium Super Featherweight (130 lbs) Champion
- World Free-style Martial Arts
  - 1982 WFMA Super Featherweight (130 lbs) Champion
  - 1982 WFMA Lightweight (135 lbs) Champion

Awards

- 1980 Fighter of the Year
- 1980 Sports Writers Association of Thailand Fight of the Year (vs. Padejsuk Pitsanurachan)

== Fight record ==
Muay Thai Record
Date	Result	Opponent	Event	Location	Method	Round	Time
1983-02-09	Loss	(Thailand) Inseenoi Sor.Thanikul		Thailand	Decision	5	3:00
1982-	Loss	(Thailand) Tawanook Sitpoonchai		Bangkok, Thailand	Decision	5	3:00
1982-12-10	Win	(United States) Dave Johnston		United States	Decision (Unanimous)		
Wins the World Free-style Martial Arts Lightweight (135 lbs) title.
1982-10-15	Win	(United States) Dave Johnston		Culver City, United States	Decision (Split)	5	3:00
1982-06-21	Win	(Thailand) Seksan Sor.Thepittak	Rajadamnern Stadium	Bangkok, Thailand	Decision	5	3:00
1982-04-28	Win	(Japan) Kunimasa Nagae	Rajadamnern Stadium - World Free-style Martial Arts	Bangkok, Thailand	TKO (left kick)	2	1:06
Wins the World Free-style Martial Arts World Super Featherweight (130 lbs) title.
1982-04-08	NC	(Thailand) Ruengsak Petchyindee	Lumpinee Stadium	Bangkok, Thailand	No Contest	5	
A detonation was heard inside the stadium stopping the action.
1982-01-15	Loss	(Thailand) Samart Payakaroon	Lumpinee Stadium	Bangkok, Thailand	Decision	5	3:00
1981-12-03	Loss	(Thailand) Padejsuk Pitsanurachan	Rajadamnern Stadium	Bangkok, Thailand	Decision	5	3:00
1981-10-30	Win	(Thailand) Raktae Muangsurin	Lumpinee Stadium	Bangkok, Thailand	Decision	5	3:00
1981-09-28	Loss	(Thailand) Kengkla Sitsei	Rajadamnern Stadium	Bangkok, Thailand	Decision	5	3:00
Loses the Rajadamnern Stadium Super Featherweight (130 lbs) title.
1981-08-06	Loss	(Thailand) Narongnoi Kiatbandit	Rajadamnern Stadium	Bangkok, Thailand	Decision	5	3:00
1981-07-02	Win	(Thailand) Kaopong Sitichuchai	Rajadamnern Stadium	Bangkok, Thailand	Decision	5	3:00
1981-03-26	Loss	(Thailand) Padejsuk Pitsanurachan	Rajadamnern Stadium	Bangkok, Thailand	Decision	5	3:00
1981-02-05	Win	(Thailand) Narongnoi Kiatbandit	Rajadamnern Stadium	Bangkok, Thailand	Decision	5	3:00
Wins the Rajadamnern Stadium Super Featherweight (130 lbs) title.
1980-12-18	Win	(Thailand) Padejsuk Pitsanurachan	Rajadamnern Stadium	Bangkok, Thailand	Decision	5	3:00
Deciding fight for the Fighter of the Year award.
1980-11-07	Win	(Thailand) Kaopong Sitichuchai	Lumpinee Stadium	Bangkok, Thailand	Decision	5	3:00
1980-08-20	Win	(Thailand) Raktae Muangsurin	Rajadamnern Stadium	Bangkok, Thailand	KO	4	
1980-07-14	Win	(Thailand) Wichannoi Porntawee	Rajadamnern Stadium	Bangkok, Thailand	Decision	5	3:00
1980-05-05	Win	(Thailand) Khaosod Sitpraprom	Rajadamnern Stadium	Bangkok, Thailand	Decision	5	3:00
1980-04-09	Win	(Mexico) Angel Gutierrez	Rajadamnern Stadium	Bangkok, Thailand	KO (Elbow)	1	
1980-03-05	Loss	(Thailand) Khaosod Sitpraprom	Rajadamnern Stadium	Bangkok, Thailand	Decision	5	3:00
1980-01-30	Win	(Thailand) Prawit Sritham	Rajadamnern Stadium	Bangkok, Thailand	Decision	5	3:00
1979-11-12	Draw	(Thailand) Prawit Sritham	Rajadamnern Stadium	Bangkok, Thailand	Decision	5	3:00
1979-10-11	Win	(Thailand) Ruengsak Porntawee	Rajadamnern Stadium	Bangkok, Thailand	Decision	5	3:00
1979-08-23	Win	(Thailand) Tawanook Sitpoonchai	Rajadamnern Stadium	Bangkok, Thailand	Decision	5	3:00
1979-07-11	Loss	(Thailand) Paennoi Sakornphitak	Rajadamnern Stadium	Bangkok, Thailand	Decision	5	3:00
1979-05-09	Loss	(Thailand) Narongnoi Kiatbandit	Rajadamnern Stadium	Bangkok, Thailand	Decision	5	3:00
For the Rajadamnern Stadium Super Featherweight (130 lbs) title.
1979-03-15	Win	(Thailand) Seksan Sor.Thepittak	Rajadamnern Stadium	Bangkok, Thailand	Decision	5	3:00
Defends the Rajadamnern Stadium Featherweight (126 lbs) title.
1979-01-17	Win	(Thailand) Kaopong Sitichuchai	Lumpinee Stadium	Bangkok, Thailand	Decision	5	3:00
1978-12-06	Loss	(Thailand) Paennoi Sakornphitak	Lumpinee Stadium	Bangkok, Thailand	Decision	5	3:00
1978-11-10	Win	(Thailand) Pudpadnoi Worawut	Lumpinee Stadium	Bangkok, Thailand	Decision	5	3:00
1978-09-28	Loss	(Thailand) Padejsuk Pitsanurachan	Rajadamnern Stadium	Bangkok, Thailand	Decision	5	3:00
1978-07-31	Loss	(Thailand) Dieselnoi Chor Thanasukarn	Rajadamnern Stadium	Bangkok, Thailand	Decision	5	3:00
1978-06-21	Win	(Thailand) Seksan Sor.Thepittak	Rajadamnern Stadium	Bangkok, Thailand	Decision	5	3:00
Defends the Rajadamnern Stadium Featherweight (126 lbs) title.
1978-05-17	Win	(Thailand) Tawanook Sitpoonchai	Rajadamnern Stadium	Bangkok, Thailand	Decision	5	3:00
Defends the Rajadamnern Stadium Featherweight (126 lbs) title.
1978-04-11	Win	(Thailand) Fakaew Surakosang	Lumpinee Stadium	Bangkok, Thailand	Decision	5	3:00
1977-12-06	Loss	(Thailand) Jitti Muangkhonkaen	Lumpinee Stadium	Bangkok, Thailand	Decision	5	3:00
1977-10-27	Win	(Thailand) Wichannoi Porntawee		Bangkok, Thailand	Decision	5	3:00
1977-08-17	Loss	(Thailand) Narongnoi Kiatbandit	Rajadamnern Stadium	Bangkok, Thailand	Decision	5	3:00
1977-06-23	Win	(Thailand) Samersing Tianhirun	Rajadamnern Stadium	Bangkok, Thailand	Decision	5	3:00
Defends the Rajadamnern Stadium Featherweight (126 lbs) title.
1977-04-28	Loss	(Thailand) Wichannoi Porntawee	Rajadamnern Stadium	Bangkok, Thailand	Decision	5	3:00
For the Rajadamnern Stadium Super Featherweight (130 lbs) title.
1976-12-29	Win	(Thailand) Sagat Petchyindee	Rajadamnern Stadium	Bangkok, Thailand	Decision	5	3:00
1976-11-11	Loss	(Thailand) Ruengsak Porntawee	Rajadamnern Stadium	Bangkok, Thailand	Decision	5	3:00
1976-09-27	Loss	(Thailand) Narongnoi Kiatbandit	Rajadamnern Stadium	Bangkok, Thailand	Decision	5	3:00
1976-08-26	Win	(Thailand) Khunponnoi Kiatsuriya	Rajadamnern Stadium	Bangkok, Thailand	Decision	5	3:00
1976-07-15	Win	(Thailand) Narongnoi Kiatbandit	Rajadamnern Stadium	Bangkok, Thailand	Decision	5	3:00
Wins the Rajadamnern Stadium Featherweight (126 lbs) title.
1976-06-09	Win	(Thailand) Sagat Petchyindee	Rajadamnern Stadium	Bangkok, Thailand	Decision	5	3:00
1976-04-06	Win	(Thailand) Jitti Muangkhonkaen	Lumpinee Stadium	Bangkok, Thailand	Decision	5	3:00
1976-03-10	Win	(Thailand) Jintadej Sakniran		Bangkok, Thailand	Decision	5	3:00
1976-02-03	Win	(Thailand) Jintadej Sakniran		Bangkok, Thailand	Decision	5	3:00
1975-11-24	Win	(Thailand) Kaew Sitpordaeng		Bangkok, Thailand	Decision	5	3:00
1975-09-29	Win	(Thailand) Manopasak Singkrungthon		Bangkok, Thailand	Decision	5	3:00
1975-08-21	Loss	(Thailand) Jitti Muangkhonkaen		Bangkok, Thailand	Decision	5	3:00
1975-07-15	Loss	(Thailand) Jocky Sitkanpai	WBC Saensak vs Perico Fernandez, Huamark Stadium	Bangkok, Thailand	KO (Knee)	3	
1975-05-30	Win	(Thailand) Weerachat Sorndaneg	Rajadamnern Stadium	Bangkok, Thailand	Decision	5	3:00
1975-03-31	Loss	(Thailand) Narongnoi Kiatbandit	Rajadamnern Stadium	Bangkok, Thailand	Decision	5	3:00
1975-02-27	Loss	(Thailand) Ruengsak Porntawee	Rajadamnern Stadium	Bangkok, Thailand	Decision	5	3:00
1975-01-31	Win	(Thailand) Khunponnoi Kiatsuriya		Bangkok, Thailand	Decision	5	3:00
1975-01-07	Win	(Thailand) Samersing Tianhirun	Lumpinee Stadium	Bangkok, Thailand	Decision	5	3:00
1974-12-19	NC	(Thailand) Weerachat Sor.Daeng	Rajadamnern Stadium	Bangkok, Thailand	Ref.stop. (Weerachat dismissed)	5	
1974-11-11	Loss	(Thailand) Ruengsak Porntawee	Rajadamnern Stadium	Bangkok, Thailand	Decision	5	3:00
1974-10-22	Loss	(Thailand) Denthoraneenoi Leudthaksin	Lumpinee Stadium	Bangkok, Thailand	Decision	5	3:00
1974-	Win	(Thailand)		Bangkok, Thailand			
1974-08-22	Win	(Thailand) Kukkong Chor Suthichot	Lumpinee Stadium	Bangkok, Thailand			
1974-07-31	Win	(Thailand) Muanglai Sakkasem	Rajadamnern Stadium	Bangkok, Thailand	Decision	5	3:00
1974-07-16	Win	(Japan) Katsuhiro Monoe	Lumpinee Stadium	Bangkok, Thailand	KO	2	1:35
1974-	Win	(Thailand)		Bangkok, Thailand			
1974-05-14	Win	(Thailand) Chamangdet Kiatmuangyom	Lumpinee Stadium	Bangkok, Thailand	Decision	5	3:00
1974-	Win	(Thailand)		Bangkok, Thailand			
1974-	Win	(Thailand)		Bangkok, Thailand			
1974-	Win	(Thailand)		Bangkok, Thailand			
1974-01-22	Win	(Hong Kong) Teng Oui-hong	Kung Fu vs Muay Thai, Huamark Stadium	Bangkok, Thailand	KO (body kick)	1	0:30
1973-10-13	Win	(Thailand) Chudaeng Sakpracha	Lumpinee Stadium	Bangkok, Thailand	Decision	5	3:00
Legend: Win Loss Draw/No contest Notes

== See more ==
- List of Muay Thai practitioners
