= Jocky Sitkanpai =

Thai former professional Muay Thai fighter

- Born: Phudta Naree; May 14, 1954 (age 72); Kranuan, Khon Kaen, Thailand
- Nickname: Horse Power Knee (ขุนเข่าพลังม้า)
- Height: 1.74 m (5 ft 9 in)
- Division: Super Featherweight
- Style: Muay Thai (Muay Khao)
- Stance: Orthodox
- Team: Sitkanpa; Sor.For.Yor

Phudta Naree (born May 14, 1954), known professionally as Jocky Sitkanpai (Thai: จ๊อกกี้ ศิษย์กันภัย), is a Thai former professional Muay Thai fighter. He is a former Rajadamnern Stadium Bantamweight Champion who was active in the 1970s.

== Biography and career ==
Phudta Naree started Muay Thai along his elder brother, he fought under the ring name Jocky Sing Sortor in Khon Kaen and neighbouring regions of Thailand until the age of 12. His powerful knees and fearless style beat many opponents in provincial arenas bringing him enough attention to be sent to the capital.

Jocky made his first Bangkok appearance in 1971 for the Sor.For.Yor. Gym under the name Jocky Aor Wattana. He defeated many of the rising contenders of the era until his name was stained by a disqualification in a match against Petchmongkon Lerkchai at Rajadamnern Stadium. His headman, Prasert Kanpai filed a complaint with an x-ray film proving that Jocky was injured and did not intentionally throw the fight. His suspension was then lifted. The Sor.For.Yor. gym name was changed to Sitkanpai Gym around the same time. He became Jocky Sitkanpai ever since.

Between 1974 and 1977 Jocky was one of the most dominant fighters on the Bangkok circuit, defeating other champions such as Samersing Tianhiran, Khunponnoi Kiatsuriya, Nongkhai Sor.Prapatsorn, Pudpadnoi Worawut Sagat Petchyindee or Padejsuk Pitsanurachan. During this period he captured the Thailand Bantamweight title in 1974 and the Rajadamnern Stadium Bantamweight title in 1975. At his peak he received purses of over 100,000 baht.

He was the Thailand and Muay Thai representant during multiple "Muay Thai vs Karate" events, fighting foreigners fgrom different martial arts backgrounds. In 1977 he beat the American karateka Lindsay Ferguson by knockout at an event with a gate of more than 1.1 million baht.

Jocky also took part in the first "two against one" bout in the Lumpinee Stadium's history. He teamed up with Jitti Muangkhonkaen, they relayed each other to fight Posai Sitiboonlert. They were defeated by decision.

Somat Hong Sakoun, the Sor.For.Yor-Sitkanpai gym owner and promotor of Jocky, in honor of his most successful fighter, renamed his camp "Jocky Gym" as Jocky was ending his career. It went on to become the home of numerous champions in the following decades.

After his retirement Jocky went back to live in his native Khon Kaen province where he cultivated sugar canes in a family business.

== Titles and accomplishments ==
- Rajadamnern Stadium
  - 1975 Rajadamnern Stadium Bantamweight (118 lbs) Champion
- Professional Boxing Association of Thailand (PAT)
  - 1974 Thailand Bantamweight (118 lbs) Champion

== Muay Thai record ==
Muay Thai Record
Date	Result	Opponent	Event	Location	Method	Round	Time
1981-04-24	Loss	(Thailand) Weerachat Sorndang		Bangkok, Thailand	KO	3	
1980-	Loss	(Thailand) Samart Prasarnmit		Bangkok, Thailand	KO	4	
1980-07-30	Loss	(Thailand) Raktae Muangsurin	Rajadamnern Stadium	Bangkok, Thailand	KO	2	
1980-04-11	Win	(Thailand) Wirachat Sorndaeng	Lumpinee Stadium	Bangkok, Thailand	Decision	5	3:00
1980-01-22	Loss	(Thailand) Youssop Sor.Thanikul	Lumpinee Stadium	Bangkok, Thailand	TKO	4	
1979-12-07	Win	(Thailand) Banranoi Fairtex	Lumpinee Stadium	Bangkok, Thailand	Decision	5	3:00
1979-10-22	Loss	(Thailand) Wangwan Lukmatulee		Chiang Mai, Thailand	Referee Stoppage	4	
1979-09-29	Loss	(Thailand) Kraipetch Sor.Prateep		Ubon Ratchathani province, Thailand	Decision	5	3:00
1979-	Win	(Japan)		Tokyo, Japan			
1979-	Loss	(Japan)		Tokyo, Japan			
1979-07-27	Loss	(Thailand) Raktae Muangsurin	Lumpinee Stadium	Bangkok, Thailand	KO	2	
1979-	Win	(Thailand) Santisuk Srisotorn	Rajadamnern Stadium	Bangkok, Thailand	Decision	5	3:00
1979-04-03	Loss	(Thailand) Kaopong Sitchuchai	Lumpinee Stadium	Bangkok, Thailand	Decision	5	3:00
1978-12-05	Loss	(Thailand) Fakaew Fairtex	Lumpinee Stadium	Bangkok, Thailand	Decision	5	3:00
1978-07-31	Loss	(Thailand) Seksan Sor.Theppitak	Rajadamnern Stadium	Bangkok, Thailand	Decision	5	3:00
1978-07-18	Loss	(Thailand) Prawit Sritham	Rajadamnern Stadium	Bangkok, Thailand	Decision	5	3:00
1978-03-29	NC	(Thailand) Kengkaj Kiatkriangkrai	Rajadamnern Stadium	Bangkok, Thailand	Ref.stop. (Jocky dismissed)	5	
1978-02-24	Loss	(Thailand) Siprae Kiatsompop	Rajadamnern Stadium	Bangkok, Thailand	Decision	5	3:00
1978-01-18	Loss	(Thailand) Narongnoi Kiatbandit	Rajadamnern Stadium	Bangkok, Thailand	Decision	5	3:00
1977-12-06	Win	(Thailand) Santi Rekchai	Lumpinee Stadium	Bangkok, Thailand	Decision	5	3:00
1977-10-31	Win	(Thailand) Padejsuk Pitsanurachan	Lumpinee Stadium	Bangkok, Thailand	Decision	5	3:00
1977-09-30	Win	(Thailand) Padejsuk Pitsanurachan	Lumpinee Stadium	Bangkok, Thailand	Decision	5	3:00
1977-09-06	Win	(United States) Lindsay Ferguson	Lumpinee Stadium	Bangkok, Thailand	KO	2	
1977-07-06	Win	(Thailand) Sagat Porntawee		Bangkok, Thailand	Decision	5	3:00
1977-05-27	Win	(Thailand) Wangwon Lukmatulee	Lumpinee Stadium	Bangkok, Thailand	Decision	5	3:00
1977-02-04	Loss	(Thailand) Posai Sitiboonlert	2 vs 1 Lumpinee Stadium	Bangkok, Thailand	Decision	6	3:00
Jocky fought the first three rounds and Jitti Muangkhonkaen the last three.
1976-12-18	Win	(Japan) Ryo Hikari	Jirapawat Boxing Stadium	Nakhon Sawan, Thailand	KO	2	
1976-10-01	Loss	(Thailand) Ruengsak Porntawee	Lumpinee Stadium	Bangkok, Thailand	Referee Stoppage	5	
1976-08-18	Loss	(Thailand) Wichannoi Porntawee	Rajadamnern Stadium	Bangkok, Thailand	Decision	5	3:00
1976-07-02	Win	(Thailand) Pudpadnoi Worawut	Lumpinee Stadium	Bangkok, Thailand	Decision	5	3:00
1976-05-21	Loss	(Thailand) Bundit Singprakarn		Bangkok, Thailand	Decision	5	3:00
1976-04-06	Draw	(Thailand) Pudpadnoi Worawut	Lumpinee Stadium	Bangkok, Thailand	Decision	5	3:00
1976-02-26	Win	(Thailand) Bangmod Lukbangkhao	Rajadamnern Stadium	Bangkok, Thailand	KO (Knees)	4	
1975-12-29	Win	(Thailand) Denthoraneenoi Ludtaksin	Rajadamnern Stadium	Bangkok, Thailand	Decision	5	3:00
1975-11-12	Loss	(Thailand) Ruengsak Porntawee	Rajadamnern Stadium	Bangkok, Thailand	Decision	5	3:00
1975-09-29	Loss	(Thailand) Narongnoi Kiatbandit	Rajadamnern Stadium	Bangkok, Thailand	Decision	5	3:00
1975-08-21	Win	(Thailand) Wangwon Lukmatulee	Rajadamnern Stadium	Bangkok, Thailand	Decision	5	3:00
1975-07-15	Win	(Thailand) Nongkhai Sor.Prapatsorn	Huamark Stadium	Bangkok, Thailand	KO (Knee)	3	
1975-06-19	Win	(Thailand) Denthoraneenoi Ludtaksin	Rajadamnern Stadium	Bangkok, Thailand	Decision	5	3:00
1975-05-14	Loss	(Thailand) Khunponnoi Kiatsuriya	Samrong Stadium	Samut Prakan, Thailand	Decision	5	3:00
1975-04-24	Loss	(Thailand) Narongnoi Kiatbandit	Rajadamnern Stadium	Bangkok, Thailand	Decision	5	3:00
1975-03-19	Win	(Thailand) Samersing Tianhiran	Rajadamnern Stadium	Bangkok, Thailand	Decision	5	3:00
1975-02-06	Win	(Thailand) Rueanpae Sitwatnang	Rajadamnern Stadium	Bangkok, Thailand	Decision	5	3:00
Wins the Rajadamnern Stadium Bantamweight (118 lbs) title.
1974-12-18	Win	(Thailand) Chansak Singwattana	Rajadamnern Stadium	Bangkok, Thailand	Decision	5	3:00
1974-11-17	Win	(Thailand) Charansak Sor.Meechai	Saensak Muangsurin vs Rudy Barro, Huamark Stadium	Bangkok, Thailand	Decision	5	3:00
Wins the Thailand Boxing Council Bantamweight (118 lbs) title.
1974-10-11	Win	(Thailand) Monprai Ludchaofah	Lumpinee Stadium	Bangkok, Thailand	Decision	5	3:00
1974-08-14	Win	(Thailand) Fakaew Singkhlonglad	Rajadamnern Stadium	Bangkok, Thailand	KO (Punches + knees)	3	
1974-	Win	(Thailand) Painum Sor.Singhadet	Rajadamnern Stadium	Bangkok, Thailand	Decision	5	3:00
1974-	Win	(Thailand) Saenrak Tianhiran	Lumpinee Stadium	Bangkok, Thailand	Decision	5	3:00
1974-	Win	(Thailand) Wangwon Lukmatulee	Rajadamnern Stadium	Bangkok, Thailand	Decision	5	3:00
1974-	Win	(Thailand) Kritphet Lukluekhamhan		Ubon Ratchathani, Thailand	Decision	5	3:00
1974-	Win	(Thailand) Fahmeechai Prasopchai	Rajadamnern Stadium	Bangkok, Thailand	Decision	5	3:00
1974-	Win	(Thailand) Norasing Kiatratana		Phuket, Thailand	Decision	5	3:00
1974-	Loss	(Thailand) Saenrak Tianhiran	Rajadamnern Stadium	Bangkok, Thailand	Decision	5	3:00
1974-	Win	(Thailand) Thapsing Sityodtong	Rajadamnern Stadium	Bangkok, Thailand	Decision	5	3:00
1974-	Win	(Thailand) Daothong Sityodtong		Rayong province, Thailand	KO	3	
1974-	Win	(Thailand) Prakasit Sing		Khon Kaen province, Thailand	KO	3	
Legend: Win Loss Draw/No contest Notes

== See more ==
- List of Muay Thai practitioners
