= Jitti Muangkhonkaen =

Thai former professional Muay Thai fighter

- Born: Somjit Viangnon; October 9, 1956 (age 70); Khon Kaen, Thailand
- Other names: Jitti Galaxy (จิตติ แกแล็คซี่); Jitti Sor.Chuwit (จิตติ ส.ชูวิทย์)
- Nickname: Trycicle Millionaire (สามล้อเงินล้าน)
- Height: 1.68 m (5 ft 6 in)
- Style: Muay Thai
- Stance: Southpaw

Somjit Viangnon (born October 9, 1956), known professionally as Jitti Muangkhonkaen or Jitti Kiatsuriya (Thai: จิตติ เมืองขอนแก่น, จิตติ เกียรติสุริยา), is a Thai former professional Muay Thai fighter.

== Biography and career ==
Jitti started Muay Thai training at the age of 13 in Khon Kaen. By the time he was 18, he had made a name for himself fighting in Bangkok.

Between 1975 and 1981 Jitti was considered one of the best fighters in Thailand. He defeated notable champions such as Nongkhai Sor.Prapatsorn, Samersing Tianhiran, Ruengsak Porntawee, Bundit Singprakarn, Vicharnnoi Porntawee, Wichit Lukbangplasoi, Poot Lorlek, Posai Sitiboonlert and Sagat Porntawee.

Jitti took part in the first "two against one" bout in Bangkok Muay Thai history. He teamed up with Jocky Sitkanpai, they relayed each other to fight Posai Sitiboonlert for three rounds each. They were defeated by decision.

Jitti was among the thai fighter selected to face foreign champions on at Lumpinee Stadium on September 6, 1977. He defeated the American kickboxer Earnest Hart Jr by TKO in the fourth round. At the peak of his career his purses reached 100,000 baht.

After his fighting career Jitti opened a restaurant in Bangkok.

== Titles and accomplishments ==
- 1977 Lumpinee Stadium Fighter of the Year

== Fight record ==
Muay Thai Record
Date	Result	Opponent	Event	Location	Method	Round	Time
1984-03-28	Loss	(Thailand) Sawainoi Daopaedriew	Rajadamnern Stadium	Bangkok, Thailand	Decision	5	3:00
1983-11-03	Loss	(Thailand) Kaopong Sitchuchai	Nawamthong, Rajadamnern Stadium	Bangkok, Thailand	Decision	5	3:00
1983		(Thailand) Saengphet Sor.Suthichai	Rajadamnern Stadium	Bangkok, Thailand			
1983		(Thailand) Yodchat Sor.Jitpattana	Rajadamnern Stadium	Bangkok, Thailand			
1983-04-19	NC	(Thailand) Jomtrai Petchyindee	Petchyindee, Lumpinee Stadium	Bangkok, Thailand	Jitti dismissed	5	
1983-01-17	Loss	(Thailand) Raktae Muangsurin	Nawamthong, Rajadamnern Stadium	Bangkok, Thailand	Decision	5	3:00
1982-11-15	Loss	(Thailand) Kaopong Sitchuchai	Lumpinee Stadium	Bangkok, Thailand	Decision	5	3:00
1982-08-18	Win	(Thailand) Inseenoi Sor.Thanikul		Bangkok, Thailand	Decision	5	3:00
1981-07-08	Loss	(Thailand) Tawanook Phenmongkol	Rajadamnern Stadium	Bangkok, Thailand	Decision	5	3:00
1981-05-08	Loss	(Thailand) Saengsakda Kittikasem	Lumpinee Stadium	Bangkok, Thailand	KO	3	
1981-04-03	Loss	(Thailand) Saengsakda Kittikasem	Lumpinee Stadium	Bangkok, Thailand	KO	3	
1981-03-10	Loss	(Thailand) Krongsak Sakkasem	Lumpinee Stadium	Bangkok, Thailand	Decision	5	3:00
1981-01-26	Loss	(Thailand) Padejsuk Pitsanurachan	Rajadamnern Stadium	Bangkok, Thailand	Decision	5	3:00
1980-10-20	Win	(Thailand) Paennoi Sakornpitak		Bangkok, Thailand	Decision	5	3:00
1980-09-17	Win	(Thailand) Youssop Sor.Thanikul		Bangkok, Thailand	Decision	5	3:00
1980-05-22	Loss	(Thailand) Raktae Muangsurin	Rajadamnern Stadium	Bangkok, Thailand	KO (Punches)	1	
1980-03-27	Win	(Thailand) Prawit Sritham		Bangkok, Thailand	Decision	5	3:00
1980-02-20	Win	(Thailand) Kengkaj Kiatkriangkrai	Phettongkam, Rajadamnern Stadium	Bangkok, Thailand	Decision	5	3:00
1979-12-12	Win	(Thailand) Youssop Sor.Thanikul	Rajadamnern Stadium	Bangkok, Thailand	Decision	5	3:00
1979-11-02	Loss	(Thailand) Khaosod Sitpraprom	Lumpinee Stadium	Bangkok, Thailand	Decision	5	3:00
1979-07-27	Loss	(Thailand) Kaopong Sitchuchai	Lumpinee Stadium	Bangkok, Thailand	Decision	5	3:00
1979-05-25	Loss	(Thailand) Posai Sitiboonlert		Bangkok, Thailand	Decision	5	3:00
1979-03-03	Win	(Thailand) Sagat Porntawee	Lumpinee Stadium	Bangkok, Thailand	Decision	5	3:00
1979-02-09	Loss	(Thailand) Khaosod Sitpraprom	Lumpinee Stadium	Bangkok, Thailand	Decision	5	3:00
1978-12-05	Loss	(Thailand) Sagat Porntawee	Lumpinee Stadium	Bangkok, Thailand	Decision	5	3:00
1978-10-10	Win	(Thailand) Seksan Sor.Theppitak	Lumpinee Stadium	Bangkok, Thailand	Decision	5	3:00
1978-05-04	Loss	(Thailand) Kengkaj Kiatkriangkrai	Rajadamnern Stadium	Bangkok, Thailand	Referee Stoppage	5	
1978-03-29	Loss	(Thailand) Narongnoi Kiatbandit	Rajadamnern Stadium	Bangkok, Thailand	Decision	5	3:00
1978-02-24	Win	(Thailand) Wichannoi Porntawee	Lumpinee Stadium	Bangkok, Thailand	Decision	5	3:00
1977-12-06	Win	(Thailand) Nongkhai Sor.Prapatsorn	Lumpinee Stadium	Bangkok, Thailand	Decision	5	3:00
1977-11-05	Win	(Thailand) Kraipetch Sor.Prateep		Roi Et, Thailand	Decision	5	3:00
1977-10-18	Loss	(Thailand) Narongnoi Kiatbandit	Lumpinee Stadium	Bangkok, Thailand	Decision	5	3:00
For the Yodmuaythai trophy.
1977-09-06	Win	(United States) Earnest Hart Jr.	Lumpinee Stadium	Bangkok, Thailand	TKO (retirement)	4	
1977-07-29	Win	(Thailand) Ruengsak Porntawee	Lumpinee Stadium	Bangkok, Thailand	Decision	5	3:00
1977-05-27	NC	(Thailand) Posai Sitiboonlert	Lumpinee Stadium	Bangkok, Thailand	Ref. Stop. (Posai dismissed)	4	
1977-04-08	Win	(Thailand) Poot Lorlek	Lumpinee Stadium	Bangkok, Thailand	Decision	5	3:00
1977-03-11	Win	(Thailand) Wichit Lukbangplasoi	Lumpinee Stadium	Bangkok, Thailand	Decision	5	3:00
1977-02-04	Loss	(Thailand) Posai Sitiboonlert	2 vs 1 Lumpinee Stadium	Bangkok, Thailand	Decision	6	3:00
Handicap fight for Posai. Jocky Sitkanpai fought the first three rounds and Jitti the last three.
1976-12-07	Win	(Thailand) Ruengsak Porntawee	Lumpinee Stadium	Bangkok, Thailand	Decision	5	3:00
1976-11-02	Loss	(Thailand) Posai Sitiboonlert	Lumpinee Stadium	Bangkok, Thailand	Decision	5	3:00
1976-09-27	Win	(Thailand) Wichannoi Porntawee	Lumpinee Stadium	Bangkok, Thailand	Decision	5	3:00
1976-07-08	Win	(Thailand) Bundit Singprakarn	Rajadamnern Stadium	Bangkok, Thailand	Decision	5	3:00
1976-05-27	Win	(Thailand) Wangwon Lukmatulee	Rajadamnern Stadium	Bangkok, Thailand	Decision	5	3:00
1976-04-06	Loss	(Thailand) Nongkhai Sor.Prapatsorn	Lumpinee Stadium	Bangkok, Thailand	Decision	5	3:00
1976-03-10	Win	(Thailand) Wangwon Lukmatulee	Rajadamnern Stadium	Bangkok, Thailand	Decision	5	3:00
1976-01-30	Win	(Thailand) Ruengsak Porntawee	Huamark Stadium	Bangkok, Thailand	KO (High Kick)	2	
1975-11-12	Win	(Thailand) Samersing Tianhiran	Rajadamnern Stadium	Bangkok, Thailand	Decision	5	3:00
1975-10-08	Loss	(Thailand) Ruengsak Porntawee	Lumpinee Stadium	Bangkok, Thailand	Decision	5	3:00
1975-09-18	Win	(Thailand) Jintadej Sakniran	Lumpinee Stadium	Bangkok, Thailand	Decision	5	3:00
1975-08-21	Win	(Thailand) Nongkhai Sor.Prapatsorn	Rajadamnern Stadium	Bangkok, Thailand	Decision	5	3:00
1975-07-15	Win	(Thailand) Adam Sor.Or.Nor	WBC Saensak vs Perico Fernandez, Huamark Stadium	Bangkok, Thailand	Decision	5	3:00
1975-06-06	Win	(Thailand) Sangpetch Sor.Sutthichai	Lumpinee Stadium	Bangkok, Thailand	Decision	5	3:00
1975-05-01	Win	(Thailand) Yodchat Sor.Chitpattana	Rajadamnern Stadium	Bangkok, Thailand	Decision	5	3:00
1975-04-01	Win	(Thailand) Chansak Singwattana	Lumpinee Stadium	Bangkok, Thailand	Decision	5	3:00
1975-02-28	Win	(Thailand) Ratchasak Sor Sawangthit		Samrong, Thailand	KO (High Kick)	2	
1975-01-31	Win	(Thailand) Kwannakhon Porntawee	Lumpinee Stadium	Bangkok, Thailand	Decision	5	3:00
1975-01-06	Win	(Thailand) Kongburi Porntawee	Lumpinee Stadium	Bangkok, Thailand	Decision	5	3:00
Legend: Win Loss Draw/No contest Notes
