= Padejsuk Pitsanurachan =

Thai former professional Muay Thai fighter

- Born: Khamsej Thepchang; October 12, 1957 (age 69); Ban Phai, Khon Kaen, Thailand
- Native name: คำเสร็จ เทพจั้ง
- Nickname: King's Cup Boxer (นักมวยถ้วยพระราชทาน)
- Height: 1.70 m (5 ft 7 in)
- Division: Lightweight
- Style: Muay Thai (???)
- Stance: Orthodox
- Team: Pitsanurachan Gym
- Years active: c. 1971-1983

Khamsej Thepchang (Thai: คำเสร็จ เทพจั้ง; born October 12, 1957), known professionally as Padejsuk Pitsanurachan (Thai: เผด็จศึก พิษณุราชันย์), is a Thai former professional Muay Thai fighter. He was the 1979 King's Muay Thai Fighter of the Year.

== Biography and career ==
Khamsej started Muay Thai at the age of 14, fighting under the name Seisuk Kwanjaithungmon. He had about 40 fights in various provinces accumulating wins against future champions such as Lom-Isan Sor.Thanikul, Nanfah Seeharajdesho and Nokweed Davy. In 1974 he moved to Bangkokg and joined the Pitsanurachan camp.

Padejsuk was one of the best fighters of the late 1970s with wins against Samersing Tianhirun, Nongkhai Sor.Prapatsorn, Sagat Petchyindee, Vicharnnoi Porntawee, Narongnoi Kiatbandit, Dieselnoi Chor Thanasukarn, Posai Sitiboonlert and Jitti Muangkhonkaen.

In 1979 he was elected fighter of the Year, he received the award from the hands of King Rama IX. Padejsuk was a complete fighter feared for his sharp elbows and heavy hands he perfected during a short stint in amateur boxing. At the peak of his career he received purses as high as 1200,000 baht.

After retirement Padejsuk opened a shop and became a Muay Thai trainer in various camps. He was an instructor at the Bangkok Thonburi University and has been teaching at a police academy in the city of Salaya since 2015.

== Titles and accomplishments ==
=== Muay Thai ===
- 1979 Sports Writers Association of Thailand Athlete of the Year
- 1980 Sports Writers Association of Thailand Fight of the Year (vs. Nongkhai Sor.Prapatsorn)

=== Boxing ===
- Rajadamnern Stadium Lightweight (135 lbs) Champion

== Fight record ==
=== Boxing record ===
0 fights	wins	losses

No.	Result	Record	Opponent	Type	Round, time	Date	Location	Notes
1	Win		(Thailand) Usonnoi Lupakanyothin				Rajadamnern Stadium, Bangkok, Thailand	Wins Rajadamnern Stadium Boxing 135 lbs title.

== Muay Thai record ==
Muay Thai Record (incomplete)
Date	Result	Opponent	Event	Location	Method	Round	Time
1983-09-21	Loss	(Thailand) Inseenoi Sor.Thanikul	Rajadamnern Stadium	Bangkok, Thailand	Decision	5	3:00
1983-08-04	Loss	(Thailand) Inseenoi Sor.Thanikul	Rajadamnern Stadium	Bangkok, Thailand	Decision	5	3:00
For the Rajadamnern Stadium Lightweight (135 lbs) title.
1983-01-20	Loss	(Thailand) Samart Prasarnmit	Rajadamnern Stadium	Bangkok, Thailand	Decision	5	3:00
1982-12-24	Loss	(Thailand) Jock Kiatniwat	Rajadamnern Stadium	Bangkok, Thailand	Decision	5	3:00
1982-09-07	Loss	(Thailand) Ruengsak Porntawee		Bangkok, Thailand	Decision	5	3:00
1982-08-03	Win	(Thailand) Sagat Petchyindee		Bangkok, Thailand	Decision	5	3:00
1982-06-10	Win	(Thailand) Sagat Petchyindee	Rajadamnern Stadium	Bangkok, Thailand	Decision	5	3:00
1982-05-10	Loss	(Thailand) Samart Payakaroon	Rajadamnern Stadium	Bangkok, Thailand	Decision	5	3:00
1982-03-12	Loss	(Thailand) Samart Payakaroon	Lumpinee Stadium	Bangkok, Thailand	Decision	5	3:00
1982-01-25	Loss	(Thailand) Dieselnoi Chor Thanasukarn		Bangkok, Thailand	Decision	5	3:00
1981-12-03	Win	(Thailand) Nongkhai Sor.Prapatsorn	Rajadamnern Stadium	Bangkok, Thailand	Decision	5	3:00
1981-11-09	Win	(Thailand) Kengkla Sitsei	Rajadamnern Stadium	Bangkok, Thailand	Decision	5	3:00
1981-10-05	Win	(Thailand) Saengsakda Kittikasem	Rajadamnern Stadium	Bangkok, Thailand	Decision	5	3:00
1981-08-24	Win	(Thailand) Kengkla Sitsei	Rajadamnern Stadium	Bangkok, Thailand	Decision	5	3:00
1981-06-14	Win	(Thailand) Sisa Rikhaen	Rajadamnern Stadium	Bangkok, Thailand	Decision	5	3:00
1981-05-14	Loss	(Thailand) Kaopong Sitichuchai	Rajadamnern Stadium	Bangkok, Thailand	Decision	5	3:00
1981-03-26	Win	(Thailand) Nongkhai Sor.Prapatsorn	Rajadamnern Stadium	Bangkok, Thailand	Decision	5	3:00
1981-01-26	Win	(Thailand) Jitti Muangkhonkaen	Rajadamnern Stadium	Bangkok, Thailand	Decision	5	3:00
1980-12-18	Loss	(Thailand) Nongkhai Sor.Prapatsorn	Rajadamnern Stadium	Bangkok, Thailand	Decision	5	3:00
1980-11-13	Win	(Thailand) Kengkaj Kiatkriangkrai	Rajadamnern Stadium	Bangkok, Thailand	Decision	5	3:00
1980-08-08	Loss	(Thailand) Kaopong Sitichuchai	Lumpinee Stadium	Bangkok, Thailand	Decision	5	3:00
1980-07-03	Win	(Thailand) Raktae Muangsurin	Rajadamnern Stadium	Bangkok, Thailand	Decision	5	3:00
1980-05-26	Win	(Australia) Paul Ferreri	Rajadamnern Stadium	Bangkok, Thailand	KO (Right high kick)	4	
Mixed rules fight, the first three rounds were boxing, the next three Muay Thai.
1980-04-28	Loss	(Thailand) Dieselnoi Chor Thanasukarn	Rajadamnern Stadium	Bangkok, Thailand	Decision	5	3:00
1980-04-10	Win	(Japan) Yasunori	Rajadamnern Stadium	Bangkok, Thailand	KO	1	
1980-03-05	Win	(Thailand) Wichannoi Porntawee	Rajadamnern Stadium	Bangkok, Thailand	Decision	5	3:00
1980-01-22	Win	(Thailand) Narongnoi Kiatbandit	Lumpinee Stadium	Bangkok, Thailand	Decision	5	3:00
Receives the King's Cup.
1979-12-07	Win	(Thailand) Posai Sitiboonlert	Lumpinee Stadium	Bangkok, Thailand	TKO (Punches)	4	
1979-11-12	Win	(Japan) Sakayuri		Bangkok, Thailand	TKO	4	
1979-10-12	Win	(Thailand) Kamlayok Kiatsompop	Lumpinee Stadium	Bangkok, Thailand	Decision	5	3:00
1979-09-07	Win	(Thailand) Khaosod Sitpraprom	Lumpinee Stadium	Bangkok, Thailand	Decision	5	3:00
1979-07-30	Win	(Japan) Satoru Matsumoto	Rajadamnern Stadium	Bangkok, Thailand	TKO (Corner Stoppage)	2	
1979-07-02	Loss	(Thailand) Wichannoi Porntawee	Rajadamnern Stadium	Bangkok, Thailand	Decision	5	3:00
1979-06-11	Win	(Thailand) Paennoi Sakornphitak	Rajadamnern Stadium	Bangkok, Thailand	Decision	5	3:00
1979-05-03	Loss	(Thailand) Dieselnoi Chor Thanasukarn		Bangkok, Thailand	Decision	5	3:00
1979-04-03	Win	(Thailand) Khaosod Sitpraprom	Lumpinee Stadium	Bangkok, Thailand	TKO	4	
1979-03-01	Win	(Thailand) Dieselnoi Chor Thanasukarn	Rajadamnern Stadium	Bangkok, Thailand	TKO (Doctor Stoppage)	4	
1979-01-17	Win	(Thailand) Narongnoi Kiatbandit	Rajadamnern Stadium	Bangkok, Thailand	Decision	5	3:00
1978-12-05	Win	(Thailand) Wichannoi Porntawee	Rajadamnern Stadium	Bangkok, Thailand	Decision	5	3:00
1978-11-02	Win	(Thailand) Sagat Petchyindee		Bangkok, Thailand	Decision	5	3:00
1978-09-28	Win	(Thailand) Nongkhai Sor.Prapatsorn	Rajadamnern Stadium	Bangkok, Thailand	Decision	5	3:00
1978-08-28	Loss	(Thailand) Sagat Petchyindee	Rajadamnern Stadium	Bangkok, Thailand	Decision	5	3:00
1978-08-03	Win	(Thailand) Tawanok Sitpoonchai	Rajadamnern Stadium	Bangkok, Thailand	Decision	5	3:00
1978-06-29	Loss	(Thailand) Ruengsak Porntawee	Rajadamnern Stadium	Bangkok, Thailand	Decision	5	3:00
1978-03-29	Loss	(Thailand) Tawanok Sitpoonchai	Rajadamnern Stadium	Bangkok, Thailand	Decision	5	3:00
1978-02-27	Loss	(Thailand) Seksan Sor Theppitak	Rajadamnern Stadium	Bangkok, Thailand	Decision	5	3:00
1978-01-16	Win	(Thailand) Fakaew Surakosang	Rajadamnern Stadium	Bangkok, Thailand	Decision	5	3:00
1977-11-28	Loss	(Thailand) Seksan Sor Theppitak		Bangkok, Thailand	Decision	5	3:00
1977-10-31	Loss	(Thailand) Jocky Sitkanpai	Lumpinee Stadium	Bangkok, Thailand	Decision	5	3:00
1977-09-30	Loss	(Thailand) Jocky Sitkanpai	Lumpinee Stadium	Bangkok, Thailand	Decision	5	3:00
1977-09-06	Loss	(Thailand) Wangwon Lukmatulee	Lumpinee Stadium	Bangkok, Thailand	TKO (Doctor Stoppage)	2	
1977-08-04	Win	(Thailand) Samersing Tianhirun	Rajadamnern Stadium	Bangkok, Thailand	Decision	5	3:00
1977-07-06	Win	(Thailand) Chanchai BuraphaMusic	Rajadamnern Stadium	Bangkok, Thailand	Decision	5	3:00
1977-06-02	Win	(Thailand) Kengkaj Kiatkriangkrai	Rajadamnern Stadium	Bangkok, Thailand	Decision	5	3:00
1977-04-28	Win	(Thailand) Nanfah Siharatdecho	Rajadamnern Stadium	Bangkok, Thailand	Decision	5	3:00
1977-03-31	Loss	(Thailand) Kengkaj Kiatkriangkrai	Rajadamnern Stadium	Bangkok, Thailand	Decision	5	3:00
1977-03-11	Win	(Thailand) Machurat Lukkhaotakep	Rajadamnern Stadium	Bangkok, Thailand	Decision	5	3:00
1977-02-04	Win	(Thailand) Nanfah Siharatdecho	Lumpinee Stadium	Bangkok, Thailand	Decision	5	3:00
1976-12-27	Win	(Thailand) Orachunnoi Hor Mahachai	Rajadamnern Stadium	Bangkok, Thailand	Decision	5	3:00
1976-	Win	(Thailand) Rueankaeo Sor.Prasit		Bangkok, Thailand	Decision	5	3:00
Legend: Win Loss Draw/No contest Notes

== See more ==
- List of Muay Thai practitioners
