= Khaosod Sitpraprom =

Thai former professional Muay Thai fighter

- Born: Suthichai Dararat; June 21, 1958 (age 68); Makham district, Chanthaburi province, Thailand
- Other names: Buakhao Lueatkromthang (บัวขาว เลือดกรมทาง); Buakaw Sitchaophraya (บัวขาว ศิษย์เจ้า)
- Nickname: Fire Jellyfish (ไอ้แมงกะพรุนไฟ)
- Height: 171 cm (5 ft 7 in)
- Division: Light Flyweight; Flyweight; Super Flyweight; Bantamweight; Super Bantamweight; Featherweight; Super Featherweight
- Style: Muay Thai
- Stance: Orthodox
- Team: Sitpraprom
- Trainer: Sing Sakornpitak

Suthichai Dararat (Thai: สุทธิชัย ดารารัตน์), known professionally as Khaosod Sitpraprom (Thai: ขาวสด ศิษย์พระพรหม), is a Thai former professional Muay Thai fighter.

== Biography and career ==
Suthichai Dararat was born on June 21, 1958, in the Chanthaburi province. While working in the Chonburi province selling oil he secretly started training in Muay Thai at the age of twelve at the Singhachaotha camp. After about two months of training he had first fight which he won using the ring name "Buakaw Sit Chaophraya." and earning 70 baht. When he reached the weight of 100 pounds, his trainer, Phichit Singhsakhonphithak, brought him to Bangkok, where he defeated Rueab Saksaithong by points at the Lumpinee Stadium. His success led him to the Sitpraprom camp, where the owner named him Khaosod Sitpraprom.

Khaosod rose to fame in 1977, spectators loved his aggressive style and his signature inside knees, earning him the nickname of Fire Jellyfish (ไอ้แมงกะพรุนไฟ) due to his clinching skills. He had his first opportunity to fight for a title on May 2, 1977, losing by decision to Tawanook Sitpoonchai for the vacant Rajadamnern Stadium Flyweight title. He then moved up in weight and competed for the Lumpinee Stadium Bantamweight title, winning on points against Singnum Ekkachai on July 18, 1978, an opponent he had already defeated. He relinquished the title as he outgrew the weight.
On August 15, 1979, Khaosod fought for the Rajadamnern Stadium Junior Lightweight title, losing by points to Narongnoi Kiatbandit. He then moved to the Lumpinee Stadium to compete for the title in the same weight class against Kamlaiyok Kiatsompop. Kamlaiyok was dismissed during the last round, making the fight a no contest. Khaosod returned to compete for a title at the Rajadamnern Stadium, winning by knockout against Samingnoom Sithiboontham on May 12, 1983 and capturing the vacant Super Featherweight title.

Khaosod defeated many notable champions of his era such as Wichannoi Porntawee, Jitti Muangkhonkaen, Nongkhai Sor.Prapatsorn, Kengkaj Kiatkriangkrai, Kengkla Sitsei, Prawit Sritham, Ruengsak Porntawee and Paennoi Sakornpitak. The highest purse of Khaosod's career was of 180,000 baht which he earned in a loss to Dieselnoi Chor Thanasukarn in an event organized by Songchai Rattanasuban.

For the last fight of his career Khaosod was brought by Klaew Thanikhul to Los Angeles to face Pete Cunningham in a kickboxing bout rules. He lost the fight by unanimous decision and chose to retire at the age of 26. After retiring, he returned to the Chanthaburi province where he owns land and works as a food delivery trucker for his family owned oyster farm.

== Titles and accomplishments ==
- Lumpinee Stadium
  - 1978 Lumpinee Stadium Bantamweight (118 lbs) Champion
- Rajadamnern Stadium
  - 1983 Rajadamnern Stadium Super Featherweight (130 lbs) Champion

== Fight record ==
Muay Thai Record
Date	Result	Opponent	Event	Location	Method	Round	Time
1984-07-27	Loss	(Canada) Pete Cunningham		Los Angeles, California, United States	Decision (unanimous)	5	3:00
1983-10-13	NC	(Thailand) Kitti Sor.Thanikul	Rajadamnern Stadium	Bangkok, Thailand	Ref.stop (Khaosod dismissed)	5	
Stripped of the Rajadamnern Stadium Super Featherweight (130 lbs) title.
1983-07-21	Loss	(Thailand) Samart Prasarnmit	Rajadamnern Stadium	Bangkok, Thailand	TKO (Knee to the body)	4	
1983-05-12	Win	(Thailand) Samingnoom Sithiboontham	Rajadamnern Stadium	Bangkok, Thailand	KO	4	
Wins the Rajadamnern Stadium Super Featherweight (130 lbs) title.
1983-03-17	Loss	(Thailand) Samingnoom Sithiboontham	Mumnamgoen, Rajadamnern Stadium	Bangkok, Thailand	KO (Elbow)	3	
For the vacant Rajadamnern Stadium Super Featherweight (130 lbs) title.
1983-01-31		(Thailand) Jock Kiatniwat	Phettongkam, Rajadamnern Stadium	Bangkok, Thailand	Decision	5	3:00
1982-08-25	Win	(Thailand) Samingnoom Sithiboontham	Wan Muay Thai, Rajadamnern Stadium	Bangkok, Thailand	Decision	5	3:00
1982-07-19	Loss	(Thailand) Kengkaj Kiatkriangkrai	Rajadamnern Stadium	Bangkok, Thailand	Decision	5	3:00
1982-06-07	Win	(Thailand) Kengkla Sitsei	Wan Muay Thai, Rajadamnern Stadium	Bangkok, Thailand	Decision	5	3:00
1982-03-31	Win	(Thailand) Jock Kiatniwat	Palangnum, Rajadamnern Stadium	Bangkok, Thailand	Decision	5	3:00
1981-12-24	Win	(Thailand) Singpathom Phongsurakan	Mumnamgoen, Rajadamnern Stadium	Bangkok, Thailand	Decision	5	3:00
1981-	Loss	(Thailand) Tawanook Sitpoonchai	Rajadamnern Stadium	Bangkok, Thailand	TKO	4	
1981-06-12	Loss	(Thailand) Sagat Petchyindee	Sirimongkol, Lumpinee Stadium	Bangkok, Thailand	KO (Punches)	3	
1981-03-26	Win	(Thailand) Kengkaj Kiatkriangkrai	Mumnamgoen, Rajadamnern Stadium	Bangkok, Thailand	Decision	5	3:00
1981-02-23	Win	(Thailand) Pon Sitpordaeng	Phettongkam, Rajadamnern Stadium	Bangkok, Thailand	KO (Low kicks)	2	
1980-11-27	Loss	(Thailand) Narongnoi Kiatbandit	Mumnamgoen, Rajadamnern Stadium	Bangkok, Thailand	Decision	5	3:00
1980-09-25	Win	(Thailand) Prawit Sritham	Rajadamnern Stadium	Bangkok, Thailand	Decision	5	3:00
1980-08-14	Win	(Thailand) Tawanook Penmongkol	Mumnamgoen, Rajadamnern Stadium	Bangkok, Thailand	Decision	5	3:00
1980-	Loss	(Thailand) Posai Sittiboonlert		Bangkok, Thailand	Decision	5	3:00
1980-05-05	Loss	(Thailand) Nongkhai Sor.Prapatsorn	Rajadamnern Stadium	Bangkok, Thailand	Decision	5	3:00
1980-03-05	Win	(Thailand) Nongkhai Sor.Prapatsorn	Rajadamnern Stadium	Bangkok, Thailand	Decision	5	3:00
1979-12-14	NC	(Thailand) Kamlaiyok Kiatsompop	Kiatsompop, Lumpinee Stadium	Bangkok, Thailand	Ref.stop. (Kamlaiyok dismissed)	5	3:00
For the Lumpinee Stadium Super Featherweight (130 lbs) title.
1979-11-02	Win	(Thailand) Jitti Kiatsuriya	Onesongchai, Lumpinee Stadium	Bangkok, Thailand	Decision	5	3:00
1979-09-07	Loss	(Thailand) Padejsuk Pitsanurachan	Chatuchok, Lumpinee Stadium	Bangkok, Thailand	Decision	5	3:00
1979-08-15	Loss	(Thailand) Narongnoi Kiatbandit	Mumnamgoen, Rajadamnern Stadium	Bangkok, Thailand	Decision	5	3:00
For the Rajadamnern Stadium Super Featherweight (130 lbs) title.
1979-06-26	Loss	(Thailand) Dieselnoi Chor Thanasukarn	Onesongchai, Lumpinee Stadium	Bangkok, Thailand	Decision	5	3:00
1979-05-11	Win	(Thailand) Wichannoi Porntawee	Sirimongkol, Lumpinee Stadium	Bangkok, Thailand	Decision	5	3:00
1979-04-03	Loss	(Thailand) Padejsuk Pitsanurachan	Lumpinee Stadium	Bangkok, Thailand	TKO (Doctor stoppage)	4	
1979-03-03	Win	(Thailand) Ruengsak Porntawee	Sai Jai Thai, Lumpinee Stadium	Bangkok, Thailand	Decision	5	3:00
1979-02-09	Win	(Thailand) Jitti Muangkhonkaen	Lumpinee Stadium	Bangkok, Thailand	Decision	5	3:00
1978-12-05	Draw	(Thailand) Ruengsak Porntawee	Phet Phloen 1, Lumpinee Stadium	Bangkok, Thailand	Decision	5	3:00
1978-10-30	Draw	(Thailand) Paruhat Loh-ngern	Shin Kakutou Jutsu	Tokyo, Japan	Decision	5	3:00
1978-10-12	Win	(Thailand) Tawanook Sitpoonchai	Mumnamgoen, Rajadamnern Stadium	Bangkok, Thailand	Decision	5	3:00
1978-09-15	Win	(Thailand) Rojdet Rojsongkram		Bangkok, Thailand	Decision	5	3:00
1978-08-24	Win	(Thailand) Kengkla Sitsei		Bangkok, Thailand	Decision	5	3:00
1978-07-18	Win	(Thailand) Singnum Ekachai	Onesongchai, Lumpinee Stadium	Bangkok, Thailand	Decision	5	3:00
Wins the Lumpinee Stadium Bantamweight (118 lbs) title.
1978-06-07	Win	(Thailand) Chainarin Chor.Talingchan	Lumpinee Stadium	Bangkok, Thailand	Decision	5	3:00
1978-05-04	Loss	(Thailand) Kengkla Sitsei		Bangkok, Thailand	Decision	5	3:00
1978-04-03	Win	(Thailand) Paennoi Sakornpitak		Bangkok, Thailand	Decision	5	3:00
1978-01-27	Win	(Thailand) Jomwo Chernyim	Lumpinee Stadium	Bangkok, Thailand	Decision	5	3:00
1977-12-06	Loss	(Thailand) Prawit Sritham	Lumpinee Stadium Anniversary Show	Bangkok, Thailand	Decision	5	3:00
1977-08-09	Win	(Thailand) Saenchai Chokger	Thahansuea, Lumpinee Stadium	Bangkok, Thailand	Decision	5	3:00
1977-05-02	Loss	(Thailand) Tawanook Sitpoonchai	Chao Tawanook, Rajadamnern Stadium	Bangkok, Thailand	Decision	5	3:00
For the vacant Rajadamnern Stadium Flyweight (112 lbs) title.
1977-03-07	Win	(Thailand) Petchnamnueng Mongkolpitak	Chao Tawanook, Rajadamnern Stadium	Bangkok, Thailand	Decision	5	3:00
1976-12-15	Loss	(Thailand) Petchnamnueng Mongkolpitak	Palangnum, Rajadamnern Stadium	Bangkok, Thailand	Decision	5	3:00
1976-11-24	Win	(Thailand) Singnum Ekachai	Rajadamnern Stadium	Bangkok, Thailand	Decision	5	3:00
Legend: Win Loss Draw/No contest Notes
