= Narongnoi Kiatbandit =

Thai former professional Muay Thai fighter

- Born: Amnat Boonrod; April 19, 1957 (age 69); Phra Nakhon Si Ayutthaya District, Thailand
- Native name: อำนาจ บุญรอด
- Nickname: Tiger That Rarely Smiles (เสือยิ้มยาก)
- Height: 1.70 m (5 ft 7 in)
- Division: Super Featherweight
- Style: Muay Thai (Muay Tae)
- Stance: Orthodox
- Team: Saknarong Gym
- Years active: c. 1971-1982

Amnat Boonrod (Thai: อำนาจ บุญรอด; born April 19, 1957), known professionally as Narongnoi Kiatbandit (Thai: ณรงค์น้อย เกียรติบัณฑิต), is a Thai former professional Muay Thai fighter. He is a former two-division Rajadamnern Stadium champion who was active during the 1970s and 1980s.

== Biography and career ==
Amnat Boonrod was born in the Ayutthaya province where he started Muay Thai training at the age of 14 by himself. He was fighting in temples under the name Raksak Thanomsak (รักศักดิ์ ถนอมศักดิ์). A year later he joined the Kiatbandit camp in Bangkok and made his debut at Lumpinee Stadium winning by knockout in the second round.

Between 1974 and 1980, Narongnoi was one of the most dominant fighters in Muay Thai. He won the Rajadamnern Stadium titles at 126 and 130 lbs. He holds wins against notable fighters such as Nongkhai Sor.Prapatsorn, Jocky Sitkanpai, Ruengsak Porntawee, Khunponnoi Kiatsuriya, Sagat Petchyindee, Vicharnnoi Porntawee, Jitti Muangkhonkaen, and Toshio Fujiwara. His best purses reached 120,000 baht.

On March 12, 1977, in Los Angeles Narongnoi faced famous American kickboxer Benny Urquidez for the WKA world title. Narongnoi was warned for illegal attacks before being deducted a point. This came after Narongnoi had scored a flash-knockdown which provoked a riot among fans in the audience who invaded the ring before the end of the fight. The California State Athletic Commission declared the no-contest.

After his retirement Narongnoi became a successful businessman. In 2009, he suffered a stroke which left him in a coma.

== Titles and accomplishments ==
- Rajadamnern Stadium
  - 1975 Rajadamnern Stadium Featherweight (126 lbs) Champion
  - 1978 Rajadamnern Stadium Super Featherweight (130 lbs) Champion
    - Three successful title defenses

== Fight record ==
Muay Thai Record
| Date | Result | Opponent | Event | Location | Method | Round | Time |
|---|---|---|---|---|---|---|---|
| 1982-07-26 | Loss | (Thailand) Fanta Phetmuangtrat | Rajadamnern Stadium | Bangkok, Thailand | Decision | 5 | 3:00 |
| 1982-03-10 | Loss | (Thailand) Singpathom Pongsurakarn | Rajadamnern Stadium | Bangkok, Thailand | Decision | 5 | 3:00 |
| 1981-12- | Loss | (Thailand) Tawanook Sitpoonchai | Rajadamnern Stadium | Bangkok, Thailand | Decision | 5 | 3:00 |
| 1981-11-13 | Loss | (Thailand) Paennoi Sakornphitak | Lumpinee Stadium | Bangkok, Thailand | Decision | 5 | 3:00 |
| 1981-09-28 | Loss | (Thailand) Kengkaj Kiatkriangkrai | Rajadamnern Stadium | Bangkok, Thailand | Decision | 5 | 3:00 |
| 1981-08-06 | Win | (Thailand) Nongkhai Sor.Prapatsorn | Rajadamnern Stadium | Bangkok, Thailand | Decision | 5 | 3:00 |
| 1981-06-18 | Loss | (Thailand) Kengkla Sitsei | Rajadamnern Stadium | Bangkok, Thailand | Decision | 5 | 3:00 |
| 1981-04-29 | Win | (Thailand) Kengkla Sitsei | Rajadamnern Stadium | Bangkok, Thailand | Decision | 5 | 3:00 |
| 1981-02-05 | Loss | (Thailand) Nongkhai Sor.Prapatsorn | Rajadamnern Stadium | Bangkok, Thailand | Decision | 5 | 3:00 |
Loses the Rajadamnern Stadium Super Featherweight (130 lbs) title.
| 1980-12-25 | Win | (Thailand) Kengkaj Kiatkriangkrai | Mumnamgoen, Rajadamnern Stadium | Bangkok, Thailand | Decision | 5 | 3:00 |
| 1980-11-27 | Win | (Thailand) Khaosod Sitpraprom | Rajadamnern Stadium | Bangkok, Thailand | Decision | 5 | 3:00 |
| 1980-07-03 | Loss | (Thailand) Kengkaj Kiatkriangkrai | Rajadamnern Stadium | Bangkok, Thailand | Decision | 5 | 3:00 |
| 1980-03-05 | Loss | (Thailand) Kaopong Sitichuchai | Rajadamnern Stadium | Bangkok, Thailand | Decision | 5 | 3:00 |
| 1980-01-22 | Loss | (Thailand) Padejsuk Pitsanurachan | Lumpinee Stadium | Bangkok, Thailand | Decision | 5 | 3:00 |
| 1979-09-27 | Win | (Thailand) Prawit Sritham | Rajadamnern Stadium | Bangkok, Thailand | Decision | 5 | 3:00 |
Defends the Rajadamnern Stadium Super Featherweight (130 lbs) title.
| 1979-08-15 | Win | (Thailand) Khaosod Sitpraprom | Rajadamnern Stadium | Bangkok, Thailand | Decision | 5 | 3:00 |
Defends the Rajadamnern Stadium Super Featherweight (130 lbs) title.
| 1979-06-28 | Loss | (Thailand) Prawit Sritham | Rajadamnern Stadium | Bangkok, Thailand | Decision | 5 | 3:00 |
| 1979-05-09 | Win | (Thailand) Nongkhai Sor.Prapatsorn | Rajadamnern Stadium | Bangkok, Thailand | Decision | 5 | 3:00 |
Defends the Rajadamnern Stadium Super Featherweight (130 lbs) title.
| 1979-04-09 | Loss | (Thailand) Paennoi Sakornphitak | Rajadamnern Stadium | Bangkok, Thailand | Decision | 5 | 3:00 |
| 1979-02-12 | Win | (Japan) Toshio Fujiwara | Rajadamnern Stadium | Bangkok, Thailand | Decision | 5 | 3:00 |
Wins 2 million baht side-bet.
| 1979-01-17 | Loss | (Thailand) Padejsuk Pitsanurachan | Rajadamnern Stadium | Bangkok, Thailand | Decision | 5 | 3:00 |
| 1978-12-06 | Loss | (Thailand) Dieselnoi Chor Thanasukarn | Rajadamnern Stadium | Bangkok, Thailand | Decision | 5 | 3:00 |
| 1978-08-28 | Win | (Thailand) Kengkaj Kiatkriangkrai | Rajadamnern Stadium | Bangkok, Thailand | Decision | 5 | 3:00 |
| 1978-08-05 | Loss | (Thailand) Wichannoi Porntawee | | Hat Yai, Thailand | Decision | 5 | 3:00 |
| 1978-06-02 | Win | (Thailand) Wichannoi Porntawee | Rajadamnern Stadium | Bangkok, Thailand | Decision | 5 | 3:00 |
Wins the Rajadamnern Stadium Super Featherweight (130 lbs) Champion.
| 1978-03-29 | Win | (Thailand) Jitti Muangkhonkaen | Rajadamnern Stadium | Bangkok, Thailand | Decision | 5 | 3:00 |
| 1978-01-18 | Win | (Thailand) Jocky Sitkanpai | Rajadamnern Stadium | Bangkok, Thailand | Decision | 5 | 3:00 |
| 1977-12-08 | Loss | (Thailand) Wichannoi Porntawee | Rajadamnern Stadium | Bangkok, Thailand | Decision | 5 | 3:00 |
For the Yodmuaythai title.
| 1977-10-18 | Win | (Thailand) Jitti Muangkhonkaen | Lumpinee Stadium | Bangkok, Thailand | Decision | 5 | 3:00 |
Receives Yodmuaythai title.
| 1977-08-17 | Win | (Thailand) Nongkhai Sor.Prapatsorn | Rajadamnern Stadium | Bangkok, Thailand | Decision | 5 | 3:00 |
| 1977-07-06 | Loss | (Thailand) Ruengsak Porntawee | | Bangkok, Thailand | Decision | 5 | 3:00 |
| 1977-06-02 | Win | (Thailand) Wichannoi Porntawee | Rajadamnern Stadium | Bangkok, Thailand | Decision | 5 | 3:00 |
| 1977-03-12 | NC | (United States) Benny Urquidez | W.K.A. Event | Los Angeles, California, USA | (crowd riot) | 9 | |
For Urquidez's W.K.A. lightweight (-65.9 kg) World title. Ruled a no contest after the bout was stopped due to a riot in the crowd after Narongnoi was penalised for multiple fouls.
| 1977-02-24 | Win | (Thailand) Sagat Petchyindee | Lumpinee Stadium | Bangkok, Thailand | Decision | 5 | 3:00 |
| 1977-01-27 | Win | (Thailand) Ruengsak Porntawee | | Bangkok, Thailand | Decision | 5 | 3:00 |
| 1976-12-15 | Loss | (Thailand) Wichannoi Porntawee | Rajadamnern Stadium | Bangkok, Thailand | Decision | 5 | 3:00 |
For the Rajadamnern Stadium Super Featherweight (130 lbs) title.
| 1976-10-28 | Win | (Thailand) Wangwan Lukmatulee | Rajadamnern Stadium | Bangkok, Thailand | Decision | 5 | 3:00 |
| 1976-09-27 | Win | (Thailand) Nongkhai Sor.Prapatsorn | Rajadamnern Stadium | Bangkok, Thailand | Decision | 5 | 3:00 |
| 1976-08-26 | Win | (Thailand) Sagat Petchyindee | Rajadamnern Stadium | Bangkok, Thailand | Decision | 5 | 3:00 |
| 1976-07-15 | Loss | (Thailand) Nongkhai Sor.Prapatsorn | Rajadamnern Stadium | Bangkok, Thailand | Decision | 5 | 3:00 |
Loses the Rajadamnern Stadium Featherweight (126 lbs) title.
| 1976-05-06 | Loss | (Thailand) Khunponnoi Kiatsuriya | Rajadamnern Stadium | Bangkok, Thailand | Decision | 5 | 3:00 |
| 1976-03-31 | Loss | (Thailand) Khunponnoi Kiatsuriya | Rajadamnern Stadium | Bangkok, Thailand | Decision | 5 | 3:00 |
| 1976-02-12 | Loss | (Thailand) Wichannoi Porntawee | Rajadamnern Stadium | Bangkok, Thailand | Decision | 5 | 3:00 |
For the Rajadamnern Stadium Super Featherweight (130 lbs) title.
| 1975-12-29 | Win | (Thailand) Khunponnoi Kiatsuriya | Rajadamnern Stadium | Bangkok, Thailand | Decision | 5 | 3:00 |
| 1975-11-24 | Win | (Thailand) Wangwon Lukmatulee | Rajadamnern Stadium | Bangkok, Thailand | Decision | 5 | 3:00 |
| 1975-09-29 | Win | (Thailand) Jocky Sitkanpai | Rajadamnern Stadium | Bangkok, Thailand | Decision | 5 | 3:00 |
| 1975-08-14 | Loss | (Thailand) Pudpadnoi Worawut | Lumpinee Stadium | Bangkok, Thailand | Decision | 5 | 3:00 |
| 1975-06-30 | Win | (Thailand) Ruengsak Porntawee | Rajadamnern Stadium | Bangkok, Thailand | Decision | 5 | 3:00 |
Wins the Rajadamnern Stadium Featherweight (126 lbs) title.
| 1975-04-24 | Win | (Thailand) Jocky Sitkanpai | Rajadamnern Stadium | Bangkok, Thailand | Decision | 5 | 3:00 |
| 1975-03-31 | Win | (Thailand) Nongkhai Sor.Prapatsorn | Rajadamnern Stadium | Bangkok, Thailand | Decision | 5 | 3:00 |
| 1975-02-27 | Win | (Thailand) Suksawat Sithewet | Rajadamnern Stadium | Bangkok, Thailand | Decision | 5 | 3:00 |
| 1975-01-23 | Win | (Thailand) Denthoraneenoi Luadthaksin | Rajadamnern Stadium | Bangkok, Thailand | Decision | 5 | 3:00 |
| 1974-12-16 | Win | (Thailand) Yodchat Sor.Jitpattana | Rajadamnern Stadium | Bangkok, Thailand | Decision | 5 | 3:00 |
| 1974-10-05 | Win | (Thailand) Klairung Lukmaochaesaithong | Rajadamnern Stadium | Bangkok, Thailand | Decision | 5 | 3:00 |
| 1974-08-16 | Win | (Thailand) Singsuk Sor.Rupsuai | Lumpinee Stadium | Bangkok, Thailand | Decision | 5 | 3:00 |
Wins the 100,000 baht side-bet.
| 1974-04-18 | Win | (Thailand) Nongrak Singkrungthon | Rajadamnern Stadium | Bangkok, Thailand | Decision | 5 | 3:00 |
| 1974-03-06 | Loss | (Thailand) Rojdet Rojsongkram | Rajadamnern Stadium | Bangkok, Thailand | Decision | 5 | 3:00 |
| 1974-01-31 | Win | (Thailand) Sittichai Phitsanurachan | Rajadamnern Stadium | Bangkok, Thailand | Decision | 5 | 3:00 |
| 1973- | Win | (Thailand) Durong Luklaemhin | Rajadamnern Stadium | Bangkok, Thailand | Decision | 5 | 3:00 |
| 1972- | Win | (Thailand) Permsiri Lukthokchan | Lumpinee Stadium | Bangkok, Thailand | KO | 2 | |
Bangkok stadium debut.
Legend: Win Loss Draw/No contest Notes

== See more ==
- List of Muay Thai practitioners
