= Ruengsak Porntawee =

Thai former professional Muay Thai fighter

- Born: Samreeng Manaying; December 17, 1956; Lam Plai Mat, Buriram, Thailand
- Native name: สำเริง มานะยิ่ง
- Nickname: Stone Man (มนุษย์หิน)
- Height: 172 cm (5 ft 8 in)
- Division: Flyweight; Featherweight; Super Featherweight
- Style: Muay Thai (Muay Mat)
- Stance: Orthodox
- Team: Porntawee Gym; Petchyindee Gym
- Years active: c. 1969-1983

Samreeng Manaying (Thai: สำเริง มานะยิ่ง; born December 17, 1956), known professionally as Ruengsak Porntawee or Ruengsak Petchyindee (Thai: เริงศักดิ์ พรทวี, เริงศักดิ์ เพชรยินดี), is a Thai former professional Muay Thai fighter. He is a former two-time Lumpinee Stadium champion and one-time Rajadamnern Stadium champion across two divisions who was famous in the 1970s and 1980s. Nicknamed the "Stone Man", he was especially known for his aggression and punching ability.

== Biography and career ==
Samreeng Manyaing started Muay Thai training at the age of 13 with an aging boxer from his region. He fought under the name "Ruengsak Luklamplaimat" and dominated in Buriram and the neighboring provinces until he was brought to the Porntawee camp.

In 1974 Ruengsak became the 112 lbs champion of both Rajadamnern and Lumpinee stadiums, he earned the nickname "The Stone Man" for his incredible durability and the power of his strikes. During his career Ruengsak defeated notable stadium champions such as Nongkhai Sor.Prapatsorn, Sirimongkol Luksiripat, Narongnoi Kiatbandit, or Padejsuk Pitsanurachan. He also captured the 130 lbs Lumpinee Stadium title in 1981. At the peak of his popularity he received purses of 150,000 baht.

In 1980 Ruengsak quit boxing for a few months before being convinced by Virat Vachirarattanawong to comeback after he bought him as debt clearance from the Porntawee gym owner. Ruengsak then became the first ever Petchyindee gym fighter.

== Titles and accomplishments ==
- Lumpinee Stadium
  - 1974 Lumpinee Stadium Flyweight (112 lbs) Champion
  - 1981 Lumpinee Stadium Super Featherweight (130 lbs) Champion
    - One successful title defense
- Rajadamnern Stadium
  - 1974 Rajadamnern Stadium Flyweight (112 lbs) Champion

== Muay Thai record ==
Muay Thai Record
Date	Result	Opponent	Event	Location	Method	Round	Time
1983-10-10	Loss	(Thailand) Inseenoi Sor.Thanikul	Rajadamnern Stadium	Bangkok, Thailand	Decision	5	3:00
1983-08-31	Loss	(Thailand) Samart Prasarnmit	Rajadamnern Stadium	Bangkok, Thailand	Decision	5	3:00
1983-06-10	Win	(Thailand) Inseenoi Sor.Thanikul		Bangkok, Thailand	Decision	5	3:00
1983-03-03	Draw	(Thailand) Padejsuk Pitsanurachan		Bangkok, Thailand	Decision	5	3:00
1982-12-24	Loss	(Thailand) Samingnoom Sitiboontham	Rajadamnern Stadium	Bangkok, Thailand	Decision	5	3:00
1982-11-19	Win	(Thailand) Fanta Petchmuangtrat	Lumpinee Stadium	Bangkok, Thailand	Decision	5	3:00
1982-09-07	Win	(Thailand) Padejsuk Pitsanurachan		Bangkok, Thailand	Decision	5	3:00
1982-08-03	Win	(Thailand) Raktae Muangsurin		Bangkok, Thailand	Decision	5	3:00
1982-05-24	Loss	(Thailand) Jock Kiatniwat	Rajadamnern Stadium	Bangkok, Thailand	Decision	5	3:00
1982-04-02	NC	(Thailand) Nongkhai Sor.Prapatsorn	Lumpinee Stadium	Bangkok, Thailand	In arena incident	5	2:40
1982-02-11	Win	(Thailand) Kengkaj Kiatkriangkrai	Mumnamgoen, Rajadamnern Stadium	Bangkok, Thailand	Decision	5	3:00
1981-12-24	NC	(Thailand) Kengkla Sitsei		Bangkok, Thailand	Ref.stop. (Kengkla dismissed)	5	
1981-11-04	Win	(Thailand) Krongsak Sakkasem	Lumpinee Stadium	Bangkok, Thailand	KO (Punches)	1	
Defends the Lumpinee Stadium Super Featherweight (130 lbs) title.
1981-07-20	Loss	(Thailand) Kengkaj Kiatkriangkrai	Rajadamnern Stadium	Bangkok, Thailand	Decision	5	3:00
1981-10-05	Win	(Thailand) Nakhonsawan Suanmisakawan	Rajadamnern Stadium	Bangkok, Thailand	KO (Punches)	3	
1981-03-23	Win	(Thailand) Tawantok Penmongkol	Lumpinee Stadium	Bangkok, Thailand	Decision	5	3:00
1981-01-23	Win	(Thailand) Pornsak Sitchang	Lumpinee Stadium	Bangkok, Thailand	Decision	5	3:00
Wins the vacant Lumpinee Stadium Super Featherweight (130 lbs) title.
1980-08-14	Loss	(Thailand) Nakhonsawan Suanmisakawan	Rajadamnern Stadium	Bangkok, Thailand	Decision	5	3:00
1980-01-22	Loss	(Thailand) Tawanlek Sitpoonchai	Lumpinee Stadium	Bangkok, Thailand	Decision	5	3:00
1979-11-22	Loss	(Thailand) Kengkaj Kiatkriangkrai	Rajadamnern Stadium	Bangkok, Thailand	Decision	5	3:00
1979-10-11	Loss	(Thailand) Nongkhai Sor.Prapatsorn	Rajadamnern Stadium	Bangkok, Thailand	Decision	5	3:00
1979-08-23	Win	(Thailand) Kengkaj Kiatkriangkrai	Chum Tang, Rajadamnern Stadium	Bangkok, Thailand	Decision	5	3:00
1979-07-03	Win	(Thailand) Kamlaiyok Kiatsompop	Lumpinee Stadium	Bangkok, Thailand	Decision	5	3:00
1979-05-25	Win	(Thailand) Kaopong Sitchuchai	Lumpinee Stadium	Bangkok, Thailand	Decision	5	3:00
1979-03-03	Loss	(Thailand) Khaosod Sitpraprom	Lumpinee Stadium	Bangkok, Thailand	Decision	5	3:00
1979-01-17	Win	(Thailand) Kengkaj Kiatkriangkrai	Rajadamnern Stadium	Bangkok, Thailand	Decision	5	3:00
1978-12-05	Draw	(Thailand) Khaosod Sitpraprom	Lumpinee Stadium	Bangkok, Thailand	Decision	5	3:00
1978-08-11	Loss	(Thailand) Kaopong Sitchuchai	Lumpinee Stadium	Bangkok, Thailand	Decision	5	3:00
For the vacant Lumpinee Stadium Featherweight (126 lbs) title.
1978-06-29	Win	(Thailand) Padejsuk Pitsanurachan	Rajadamnern Stadium	Bangkok, Thailand	Decision	5	3:00
1978-05-25	Win	(Thailand) Prawit Sritham	Rajadamnern Stadium	Bangkok, Thailand	Decision	5	3:00
1978-04-11	Loss	(Thailand) Seksan Sor.Thepithak	Lumpinee Stadium	Bangkok, Thailand	Decision	5	3:00
1978-02-24	Win	(Thailand) Nueusila Na Bankhod	Lumpinee Stadium	Bangkok, Thailand	Decision	5	3:00
1977-12-06	Loss	(Thailand) Wangwon Lukmatulee	Lumpinee Stadium	Bangkok, Thailand	Decision	5	3:00
1977-07-29	Loss	(Thailand) Jitti Muangkhonkaen	Lumpinee Stadium	Bangkok, Thailand	Decision	5	3:00
1977-07-06	Win	(Thailand) Narongnoi Kiatbandit		Bangkok, Thailand	Decision	5	3:00
1977-06-02	Win	(Thailand) Neth Saknarong	Rajadamnern Stadium	Bangkok, Thailand	Decision	5	3:00
1977-04-28	Win	(Thailand) Fakaew Surakorsang	Rajadamnern Stadium	Bangkok, Thailand	KO (Punches)	3	
1977-03-31	Draw	(Thailand) Fakaew Surakorsang	Rajadamnern Stadium	Bangkok, Thailand	Decision	5	3:00
1977-02-24	Win	(Thailand) Amnuaydej Devy	Lumpinee Stadium	Bangkok, Thailand	Decision	5	3:00
1977-01-27	Loss	(Thailand) Narongnoi Kiatbandit		Bangkok, Thailand	Decision	5	3:00
1976-12-07	Loss	(Thailand) Jitti Muangkhonkaen	Lumpinee Stadium	Bangkok, Thailand	Decision	5	3:00
1976-11-11	Win	(Thailand) Nongkhai Sor.Prapatsorn	Rajadamnern Stadium	Bangkok, Thailand	Decision	5	3:00
1976-10-01	Win	(Thailand) Jocky Sitkanpai	Lumpinee Stadium	Bangkok, Thailand	Referee Stoppage	5	
1976-07-01	Win	(Thailand) Kaew Sitpodaeng	Rajadamnern Stadium	Bangkok, Thailand	Decision	5	3:00
1976-05-04	Loss	(Thailand) Weerachat Sorndaeng	Lumpinee Stadium	Bangkok, Thailand	Decision	5	3:00
1976-01-30	Loss	(Thailand) Jitti Muangkhonkaen	Huamark Stadium	Bangkok, Thailand	KO (High Kick)	2	
1975-11-12	Loss	(Thailand) Jocky Sitkanpai	Rajadamnern Stadium	Bangkok, Thailand	Decision	5	3:00
1975-10-08	Win	(Thailand) Jitti Muangkhonkaen	Lumpinee Stadium	Bangkok, Thailand	Decision	5	3:00
1975-06-30	Loss	(Thailand) Narongnoi Kiatbandit	Rajadamnern Stadium	Bangkok, Thailand	Decision	5	3:00
For the Rajadamnern Stadium Featherweight (126 lbs) title.
1975-05-30	Loss	(Thailand) Bundit Singprakarn	Lumpinee Stadium	Bangkok, Thailand	Decision	5	3:00
1975-05-02	Loss	(Thailand) Pudpadnoi Worawut	Lumpinee Stadium	Bangkok, Thailand	Decision	5	3:00
1975-03-31	Win	(Thailand) Sirimongkol Luksiripat	Rajadamnern Stadium	Bangkok, Thailand	Decision	5	3:00
1975-02-27	Win	(Thailand) Nongkhai Sor.Prapatsorn	Rajadamnern Stadium	Bangkok, Thailand	Decision	5	3:00
1975-01-06	Win	(Thailand) Khunponnoi Kiatsuriya	Rajadamnern Stadium	Bangkok, Thailand	Decision	5	3:00
1974-12-	Win	(Thailand) Suksawat Srithewet	Rajadamnern Stadium	Bangkok, Thailand	Decision	5	3:00
1974-11-11	Win	(Thailand) Nongkhai Sor.Prapatsorn	Rajadamnern Stadium	Bangkok, Thailand	Decision	5	3:00
1974-	Win	(Thailand) Samersing Tianhiran	Rajadamnern Stadium	Bangkok, Thailand	Decision	5	3:00
1974-08-22	Win	(Thailand) Paruhat Loh-ngoen	Rajadamnern Stadium	Bangkok, Thailand	Decision	5	3:00
1974-	Loss	(Thailand) Denthoraneenoi Ludtaksin	Rajadamnern Stadium	Bangkok, Thailand	Decision	5	3:00
1974-06-20	Loss	(Thailand) Denthoraneenoi Ludtaksin	Rajadamnern Stadium	Bangkok, Thailand	Decision	5	3:00
For a 600,000 baht side-bet.
1974-05-23	Win	(Thailand) Orachunnoi Hor Mahachai	Rajadamnern Stadium	Bangkok, Thailand	Decision	5	3:00
1974-04-20	Win	(Thailand) Naret Kiat Chor.Por.	All Japan Kickboxing Association	Tokyo, Japan	Decision	5	3:00
Wins the Rajadamnern Stadium Flyweight (112 lbs) title.
1974-	Win	(Thailand) Sornphiphat Siharatdecho		Buriram, Thailand	Decision	5	3:00
1974-03-12	Win	(Thailand) Daonin Singasawin	Lumpinee Stadium	Bangkok, Thailand	Decision	5	3:00
Wins the Lumpinee Stadium Flyweight (112 lbs) title.
1974-	Win	(Thailand) Saman Lukbanpho	Lumpinee Stadium	Bangkok, Thailand	KO	4	
1973-04-03	Loss	(Thailand) Paruhat Loh-ngern	Kiatsiam, Lumpinee Stadium	Bangkok, Thailand	Decision	5	3:00
1974-01-22	Win	(Hong Kong) Ou Joon-hai	Kung Fu vs Muay Thai, Huamark Stadium	Bangkok, Thailand	KO (low kick)	1	1:22
1972-09-29	Win	(Thailand) Samansak Poonsapcharoen	Huamark Stadium	Bangkok, Thailand	Decision	5	3:00
Legend: Win Loss Draw/No contest Notes

== See more ==
- List of Muay Thai practitioners
