= Satanfah Sor.Prateep =

Thai professional Muay Thai fighter (1952–2021)

- Born: Attapon Noppasri; October 13, 1952; Trakan Phuet Phon, Ubon Ratchathani, Thailand
- Died: April 15, 2021 (aged 69); Ubon Ratchathani, Thailand
- Native name: อรรถพล นพศรี
- Height: 1.80 m (5 ft 11 in)
- Division: Super Lightweight; Welterweight; Middleweight
- Style: Muay Thai (Muay Mat)
- Stance: Orthodox
- Years active: c. 1968–1983

Other information
- Boxing record from BoxRec

Attapon Noppasri (Thai: อรรถพล นพศรี; October 13, 1952 – April 15, 2021), known professionally as Satanfah Sor.Prateep (Thai: สะท้านฟ้า ส.ประทีป), was a Thai professional Muay Thai fighter. He was a one-time Lumpinee Stadium champion and a three-time Rajadamnern Stadium champion across three divisions who was famous during the 1970s and 1980s.

His most notable wins include Apidej SitHirun, Sirimongkol Luksiripat, Neth Saknarong, Buriram Suanmiskawan, Sorasak Sor.Lukbuklo, Khunpon Sakornpitak, Igari Genshuu, and Huasai Sittiboonlert.

== Career and biography ==
Satanfah came from a small village in Trakan Phuet Phon District, Ubon Ratchathani. He was the fourth child out of ten siblings. He would be the first in his family to start boxing and three of his brothers later joined him.

Satanfah started boxing under Ajarn Wanlop Ketsena, the head of the Senapitak boxing camp in his home district. He would have his first fight in 1968, at 14 years old, under the ring name Praisatan Senapitak. He would win this fight after which he received 45 baht. He went on to win 15 more consecutive fights in Ubon Ratchathani.

As he was also studying in school at the time, he wanted to lighten the financial load of his parents, so he also became a Tuk-Tuk Taxi driver.

After he graduated from Ubon Ratchathani Technical College at Vocational level, Satanfah made his way to Bangkok where he started living with Mr. Sakorn Prathanaprateep, the head of Sor.Prateep boxing camp, where he would take on the name to Satanfah Sor.Prateep and started fighting at Rajadamnern Stadium and Lumpinee Stadium.

Satanfah famously won five titles in his career, four in Muay Thai, and the last, a national title in Boxing.

His first title, the Light welterweight (140 lbs) Rajadamnern Stadium title was acquired in Japan in 1974 against Sorasak Sor.Lukbuklo, the nephew of Suk Prasarthinpimai. Sorasak had initially won the title against Prayuth Suparak, then beat Saensak Muangsurin but lost it soon after in the rematch as Saensak won via first round knockout. He later won the vacant title against Buriram Suanmiskawan and then lost it to Satanfah.

His second was the Welterweight (147 lbs) Rajadamnern Stadium title, which he won in 1975 against Khunpon Sakornpitak.

In 1977, despite spending most of his time fighting in Lumpinee Stadium up to this point, Satanfah was given yet another Rajadamnern Stadium title shot, which he won against Tongtha Kiatwayupak.

In April 1978, just one month after Japanese Muay Thai legend Toshio Fujiwara had beaten Mongsawan Rukchiangmai in Japan to become the first foreigner ever to win the Rajadamnern Stadium title, Satanfah was to face former rival and Japanese Kickboxer Igari Genshuu this time for the Lumpinee Stadium Middleweight title. Igari Genshuu had knocked out Satanfah two years earlier to the shock of the audience at Lumpinee Stadium. Satanfah successfully took his revenge and won the title by decision.

Satanfah fought in Muay Thai up until 1980, when he made the switch to boxing, where he initially had success, winning three fights in a row and the national Boxing title at 160 lbs against Mana Premchai. He then fought three times in South Korea, against two OPBF Champions, and WBA World Champion In-Chul Baek.

He retired from fighting in 1983, at 31 years old after his last loss in Boxing.

== Titles ==
=== Muay Thai ===
Rajadamnern Stadium

- 1974 Rajadamnern Stadium Super Lightweight (140 lbs) Champion
- 1975 Rajadamnern Stadium Welterweight (147 lbs) Champion
- 1977 Rajadamnern Stadium Middleweight (160 lbs) Champion

Lumpinee Stadium

- 1978 Lumpinee Stadium Middleweight (160 lbs) Champion

== Fight record ==
Muay Thai Record (Incomplete)
Date	Result	Opponent	Event	Location	Method	Round	Time
1979-12-01	Win	(Thailand) Phongdetnoi Prasopchai	Lumpinee Stadium	Bangkok, Thailand	Decision	5	3:00
1979-10-08	Win	(Thailand) Karawek Kwanchaichonabot	Lumpinee Stadium	Bangkok, Thailand	Decision	5	3:00
1979-01-23	Draw	(Thailand) Poot Lorlek	Ubon Ratchathani Boxing Stadium	Ubon Ratchathani, Thailand	Decision	5	3:00
1978-09-30	Win	(Thailand) Neth Saknarong	Lumpinee Stadium	Bangkok, Thailand	TKO	2	
1978-08-18	Win	(Netherlands) Faisal Karakuş	Holland vs Thailand, Lumpinee Stadium	Bangkok, Thailand	KO	2	
1978-07-04	Win	(Thailand) David Amornrat	Lumpinee Stadium	Bangkok, Thailand	Decision	5	3:00
1978-04-07	Win	(Japan) Genshuu Igari	Lumpinee Stadium	Bangkok, Thailand	Decision	5	3:00
Wins the vacant Lumpinee Stadium Middleweight (160 lbs) title.
1977-	Win	(Thailand) Tongtha Kiatiwayupak	Rajadamnern Stadium	Bangkok, Thailand	Decision	5	3:00
Wins the Rajadamnern Stadium Middleweight (160 lbs) title.
1976-05-27	Win	(Thailand) Phongdetnoi Prasopchai	Rajadamnern Stadium	Bangkok, Thailand	Decision	5	3:00
Defends the Rajadamnern Stadium Welterweight (147 lbs) title.
1976-04-23	Win	(Thailand) Sirimongkol Luksiripat	Lumpinee Stadium	Bangkok, Thailand	Decision	5	3:00
1976-02-03	Loss	(Japan) Genshuu Igari	Lumpinee Stadium	Bangkok, Thailand	KO	3	
1975-12-05	Win	(Thailand) Prayut Sithiboonlert		Bangkok, Thailand	KO	3	
1975-09-12	Loss	(Thailand) Poot Lorlek	Lumpinee Stadium	Bangkok, Thailand	Decision	5	3:00
1975-06-02	Win	(Thailand) Khunpon Sakornphitak	Rajadamnern Stadium	Bangkok, Thailand	Decision	5	3:00
Wins the Rajadamnern Stadium Welterweight (147 lbs) title.
1975-04-07	Win	(Thailand) Apidej SitHiran	Rajadamnern Stadium	Bangkok, Thailand	Decision	5	3:00
1975-02-11	Loss	(Thailand) Pichit Singchuekluang	Huamark Stadium	Bangkok, Thailand	Decision	5	3:00
1975-01-14	Loss	(Thailand) Poot Lorlek	Lumpinee Stadium	Bangkok, Thailand	Decision	5	3:00
1974-11-30	Win	(Thailand) Sorasak Sor.Lukbuklo		Japan	KO	3	
Wins the Rajadamnern Stadium Super Lightweight (140 lbs) title.
1974-10-08	Win	(Thailand) Karawek Kwanchaichonabot	Lumpinee Stadium	Bangkok, Thailand	KO	2	
1974-09-26	Win	(Thailand) Buriram Suanmiskawan	Lumpinee Stadium	Bangkok, Thailand	KO	3	
1974-07-12	Loss	(Thailand) Prayuth Sittiboonlert	Lumpinee Stadium	Bangkok, Thailand	Decision	5	3:00
1974-06-17	Win	(Thailand) Huasai Sittiboonlert	Lumpinee Stadium	Bangkok, Thailand	KO	3	
1974-05-17	Win	(Thailand) Trang Sitpongchai	Lumpinee Stadium	Bangkok, Thailand	KO	3	
1974-04-16	Win	(Thailand) Sorasak Sor.Lukbuklo	Lumpinee Stadium	Bangkok, Thailand	Decision	5	3:00
1974-03-09	Loss	(Thailand) Chatpraset Rungrit		Ubon Ratchathani, Thailand	Decision	5	3:00
1974-01-15	Win	(Thailand) Krailar Silatong	Lumpinee Stadium	Bangkok, Thailand	Decision	5	3:00
Legend: Win Loss Draw/No contest Notes
