= Poot Lorlek =

Thai professional Muay Thai fighter and boxer (1952–2020)

- Poot in the 1970s
- Born: Taweesak Pipatkul; January 1, 1952; Bang Duan, Palian, Trang, Thailand
- Died: June 1, 2020 (aged 68); Songkhla, Thailand; Heart failure
- Native name: พุฒ ล้อเหล็ก
- Nickname: The Boy from Trang (ไอ้หนูเมืองตรัง); Angel Boxer; The Comet of the South
- Height: 174 cm (5 ft 9 in)
- Division: Super Bantamweight
- Style: Muay Thai (Muay Femur); Boxing
- Stance: Orthodox
- Years active: c. 1969–1979

Professional boxing record
- Total: 8
- Wins: 8
- By knockout: 3

Kickboxing record
- Total: 66
- Wins: 51
- By knockout: 7
- Losses: 13
- Draws: 2

Other information
- Occupation: Muay Thai fighter Muay Thai trainer
- Boxing record from BoxRec

Taweesak Pipatkul (Thai: ทวีศักดิ์ พิพัฒน์กุล; born January 1, 1952 – June 1, 2020) known professionally as Poot Lorlek (Thai: พุฒ ล้อเหล็ก), was a Thai professional Muay Thai fighter and boxer. He was a Lumpinee Stadium Super Bantamweight Champion who was famous in the 1970s. Nicknamed the "Angel Boxer", he is often regarded as one of the greatest fighters in the history of Muay Thai.

== Biography and career ==
Taweesak Pipatkul was born on January 1, 1952 in Palian, Trang, Thailand. He first practiced Muay Thai at the age of 15 in a Muay Thai gym of his native province. He became very famous in the 1970s, having fought with many top-line Muay Thai boxers such as Wichannoi Porntawee, Pudpadnoi Worawut, Posai Sittiboonlert, Saensak Muangsurin, Jitti Muangkhonkaen, Neth Saknarong, Bundit Singprakarn, Wichit Lukbangplasoi, Sirimongkol Luksiripat, and Satanfah Sor.Prateep.

In a span of about 10 years, he had about 80 fights, without ever being knocked down or knocked out. He was sent down by Sirimongkol Luksiripat once in 1973, but the referee didn't count and Poot won the fight on points.

In professional boxing he was Thailand lightweight champion in 1975 and was top 10 ranked in the junior welterweight division by the WBA.

=== Retirement and death ===
After retirement, he returned to open a Muay Thai gym in Trang Province under the name "Muay Thai Gym Poot Lorlek" in 2011. Poot Lorlek died on June 1, 2020, at around 09.00 p.m. of heart failure, after heart surgery at Songklanagarind Hospital, Hat Yai. He was 68 years old.

== Titles and accomplishments ==
Muay Thai

- Lumpinee Stadium
  - 1971 Lumpinee Stadium Super Bantamweight (122 lbs) Champion

Boxing

- Professional Boxing Association of Thailand (PAT)
  - 1975 Thailand Lightweight (135 lbs) Champion

Awards

- 1975 Fight of the Year (vs Wichannoi Porntawee)
- 2014 Siam Sport Awards Hall of Fame (Muay Thai)
- Muay Siam Magazine Fighter of the Century

== Professional boxing record ==
8 fights	8 wins	0 losses
By knockout	3	0
By decision	5	0

No.	Result	Record	Opponent	Type	Round	Date	Location	Notes
8	Win	8–0	(Taiwan) Chung Moon Chin	PTS	10 (10)	Jan 25 1977	(Thailand) Lumpinee Stadium, Bangkok	
7	Win	7–0	(Thailand) Aryid Khan	PTS	6 (6)	Dec 6 1976	(Thailand) Bangkok	
6	Win	6–0	(Japan) Hiroshi Katono	PTS	10 (10)	Nov 26 1976	(Thailand) Lumpinee Stadium, Bangkok	
5	Win	5–0	(South Korea) Young Ho Oh	PTS	10 (10)	Oct 5 1976	(Thailand) Lumpinee Stadium, Bangkok	
4	Win	4–0	(Indonesia) Sperling Pangaribuan	TKO	7 (10)	June 8, 1976	(Thailand) Lumpinee Stadium, Bangkok	
3	Win	3–0	(Australia) Lawrence Austin	PTS	10	Oct 14 1975	(Thailand) Lumpinee Stadium, Bangkok	
2	Win	2–0	(Thailand) Malaithong Sitkoon	KO	7 (10)	August 23, 1975	(Thailand) Mae Sai, Chiang Rai	Won Thailand lightweight title
1	Win	1–0	(Thailand) Singtanongsak Chanthaburi	KO	1 (6)	April 27, 1975	(Thailand) Chanthaburi	

== Muay Thai record ==
Muay Thai Record (incomplete)
Date	Result	Opponent	Event	Location	Method	Round	Time
1978-01-22	Draw	(Thailand) Satanfah Sor.Prateep		Ubon Ratchathani, Thailand	Decision	5	3:00
1978-11-04	Win	(Thailand) Siangnao Bangprachan		Nakhon Ratchasima, Thailand	Decision	5	3:00
1978-09-23	Loss	(Thailand) David Amornrat		Phuket, Thailand	Decision	5	3:00
1977-11-05	NC	(Thailand) Posai Sitiboonlert		Hat Yai, Thailand	Ref. stop (Poot dismissed)	5	
Poot was dismissed by the referee for a below-par performance.
1977-10-19	Win	(Thailand) Kraipetch Sor.Prateep		Lampang, Thailand	Decision	5	3:00
1977-09-23	Loss	(Thailand) Phongdetnoi Prasopchai	Lumpinee Stadium	Bangkok, Thailand	Decision	5	3:00
1977-08-19	Win	(Japan) Genshu Igari	Lumpinee Stadium	Bangkok, Thailand	KO (Left High Kick)	1	
1977-07-29	Win	(Thailand) Mehmood Lukbothong	Hat Yai Boxing Stadium	Hat Yai, Thailand	Decision	5	3:00
1977-05-27	Loss	(Thailand) Wichit Lukbangplasoi	Lumpinee Stadium	Bangkok, Thailand	Decision	5	3:00
1977-04-08	Loss	(Thailand) Jitti Muangkhonkaen	Lumpinee Stadium	Bangkok, Thailand	Decision	5	3:00
1977-03-11	Loss	(Thailand) Posai Sitiboonlert	Lumpinee Stadium	Bangkok, Thailand	Decision	5	3:00
For the Yodmuaythai trophy.
1977-02-11	Win	(Thailand) Kongdej Lukbangplasoi	Lumpinee Stadium	Bangkok, Thailand	Decision	5	3:00
1976-05-14	Win	(Thailand) Neth Saknarong	Rajadamnern Stadium	Bangkok, Thailand	Decision	5	3:00
Receives the Yodmuaythai trophy.
1976-03-25	Loss	(Thailand) Neth Saknarong	Rajadamnern Stadium	Bangkok, Thailand	Decision	5	3:00
1976-03-02	Win	(Thailand) Wichit Lukbangplasoi	Lumpinee Stadium	Bangkok, Thailand	Decision	5	3:00
Receives the Yodmuaythai trophy.
1975-11-28	Win	(Thailand) Bundit Singprakarn	Lumpinee Stadium	Bangkok, Thailand	Decision	5	3:00
1975-09-12	Win	(Thailand) Satanfah Sor.Prateep	Lumpinee Stadium	Bangkok, Thailand	Decision	5	3:00
1975-06-19	Win	(Thailand) Wichannoi Porntawee	Rajadamnern Stadium	Bangkok, Thailand	Decision	5	3:00
Receives the Yodmuaythai trophy.
1975-02-11	Win	(Thailand) Wichit Lukbangplasoi	Huamark Stadium	Bangkok, Thailand	Decision	5	3:00
1975-01-14	Win	(Thailand) Satanfah Sor.Prateep	Lumpinee Stadium	Bangkok, Thailand	Decision	5	3:00
1974-10-08	Win	(Thailand) Saensak Muangsurin	Lumpinee Stadium	Bangkok, Thailand	Decision	5	3:00
Receives the Yodmuaythai trophy.
1974-07-12	Loss	(Thailand) Saensak Muangsurin	Lumpinee Stadium	Bangkok, Thailand	Decision	5	3:00
1974-05-31	Win	(Thailand) Kongdej Lukbangplasoi	Lumpinee Stadium	Bangkok, Thailand	Decision	5	3:00
1974-03-12	Win	(Thailand) Saensak Muangsurin	Lumpinee Stadium	Bangkok, Thailand	Decision	5	3:00
1974-02-08	Win	(Thailand) Chuchai Lukpanchama	Lumpinee Stadium	Bangkok, Thailand	Decision	5	3:00
1973-12-14	Win	(Thailand) Pansak Kiatcharoenchai	Lumpinee Stadium	Bangkok, Thailand	Decision	5	3:00
1973-09-07	Win	(Thailand) Sirimongkol Luksiripat	Huamark Stadium	Bangkok, Thailand	Decision	5	3:00
Receives the Yodmuaythai trophy.
1973-05-11	Win	(Thailand) Muangchon Jeeraphan	Lumpinee Stadium	Bangkok, Thailand	Decision	5	3:00
1973-02-09	Win	(Thailand) Saensak Muangsurin	Huamark Stadium	Bangkok, Thailand	Decision	5	3:00
1972-12-15	Win	(Thailand) Sornnak Kiatwayupak	Lumpinee Stadium	Bangkok, Thailand	Decision	5	3:00
1972-10-06	Win	(Thailand) Buriram Suanmiskawan	Lumpinee Stadium	Bangkok, Thailand	Decision	5	3:00
1972-09-01	Loss	(Thailand) Burengnong Sakornpitak	Lumpinee Stadium	Bangkok, Thailand	Decision	5	3:00
1972-08-04	Loss	(Thailand) Denthoranee Muangsurin	Lumpinee Stadium	Bangkok, Thailand	Decision	5	3:00
1972-06-09	Win	(Thailand) Saengmorakot Saengsawang	Lumpinee Stadium	Bangkok, Thailand	Decision	5	3:00
1972-04-25	Loss	(Thailand) Wichannoi Porntawee	Lumpinee Stadium	Bangkok, Thailand	Decision	5	3:00
1972-03-11	Win	(Thailand) Chaiyut Sittiboonlert	Lumpinee Stadium	Bangkok, Thailand	Decision	5	3:00
1972-02-15	Win	(Thailand) Fahsai Thaweechai	Huamark Stadium	Bangkok, Thailand	Decision	5	3:00
1971-11-05	Loss	(Thailand) Wichannoi Porntawee	Lumpinee Stadium	Bangkok, Thailand	Decision	5	3:00
1971-09-14	Win	(Thailand) Aswin Jinpinpetch	Lumpinee Stadium	Bangkok, Thailand	Decision	5	3:00
1971-08-06	Win	(Thailand) Chalermsak Ploenjit	Lumpinee Stadium	Bangkok, Thailand	Decision	5	3:00
1971-07-02	Win	(Thailand) Namsurin Muangsurin	Lumpinee Stadium	Bangkok, Thailand	Decision	5	3:00
1971-04-30	Win	(Thailand) Norasing Sida	Lumpinee Stadium	Bangkok, Thailand	Decision	5	3:00
1971-04-02	Win	(Thailand) Samyan Singsornthong	Huamark Stadium	Bangkok, Thailand	Decision	5	3:00
1971-03-02	Win	(Thailand) Apisak Muangsurin	Lumpinee Stadium	Bangkok, Thailand	Decision	5	3:00
1971-01-29	Win	(Thailand) Samyan Singsornthong	Lumpinee Stadium	Bangkok, Thailand	Decision	5	3:00
Wins the Lumpinee Stadium Super Bantamweight (122 lbs) title.
1971-01-06	Win	(Thailand) Chanrob Luknaka	Lumpinee Stadium	Bangkok, Thailand	Decision	5	3:00
1970-08-28	Win	(Thailand) Adul Keatdara	Lumpinee Stadium	Bangkok, Thailand	KO (Left High Kick)	4	
1970-11-06	Win	(Thailand) Thongsabad Sityodtong	Lumpinee Stadium	Bangkok, Thailand	Decision	5	3:00
1970-10-16	Win	(Thailand) Suksawat Srithewet	Lumpinee Stadium	Bangkok, Thailand	Decision	5	3:00
1970-08-28	Win	(Thailand) Adul Kiatdara	Lumpinee Stadium	Bangkok, Thailand	KO	5	
1970-07-31	Win	(Thailand) Thanomchit Sukhotai	Lumpinee Stadium	Bangkok, Thailand	Decision	5	3:00
1970-07-07	Loss	(Thailand) Phanomporn Kiatsakkongka	Lumpinee Stadium	Bangkok, Thailand	Decision	5	3:00
1970-06-07	Win	(Thailand) Fighter Thepparat		Ubon Ratchathani, Thailand	KO	2	
1970-05-18	Win	(Thailand) Daengnoi Singnongpo		Chonburi, Thailand	Decision	5	3:00
1970-05-01	Win	(Thailand) Mangkorndam Sakornsiam	Lumpinee Stadium	Bangkok, Thailand	Decision	5	3:00
1970-04-13	Loss	(Thailand) Mangkorndam Sakornsiam	Lumpinee Stadium	Bangkok, Thailand	Decision	5	3:00
1970-03-22	Win	(Thailand) Odnoi Singpimai		Korat, Thailand	Decision	5	3:00
1970-02-28	Win	(Thailand) Yodpayak Suttasing		Chonburi, Thailand	KO	3	
1970-02-03	Win	(Thailand) Phopin Petchingchai		Ratchaburi, Thailand	Decision	5	3:00
1970-01-13	Win	(Thailand) Phusing Singeso	Lumpinee Stadium	Bangkok, Thailand	Decision	5	3:00
1969-11-28	Win	(Thailand) Bamrungkiat Sinsengam	Lumpinee Stadium	Bangkok, Thailand	Decision	5	3:00
1969-11-05	Win	(Thailand) Seuakhao Sor.Ruerit		Ratchaburi, Thailand	Decision	5	3:00
1969-10-04	Win	(Thailand) Sorapetch Pornpayak		Yala, Thailand	KO	3	
1969-09-26	Win	(Thailand) Weerapan Sor.Rupsuay	Lumpinee Stadium	Bangkok, Thailand	Decision	5	3:00
1969-08-27	Win	(Thailand) Kraikitti Thongpichai		Thailand	Decision	5	3:00
1969-08-02	Win	(Thailand) Frapahtan Singthanongsak	Lumpinee Stadium	Bangkok, Thailand	KO		
1969-07-23	Win	(Thailand) Saksit Sornburapha		Korat, Thailand	Decision	5	3:00
1969-07-01	Draw	(Thailand) Praithong Sithisiam	Lumpinee Stadium	Bangkok, Thailand	Decision	5	3:00
1969-06-14	Win	(Thailand) Sirinarong Sakthanine	Lumpinee Stadium	Bangkok, Thailand	Decision	5	3:00
Debut in Bangkok.
Legend: Win Loss Draw/No contest Notes

== See more ==
- List of Muay Thai practitioners
