= Sirimongkol Luksiripat =

Thai professional Muay Thai fighter (1946–2018)

- Born: Kasem Prapaisri; December 2, 1946; Chachoengsao, Thailand
- Died: August 18, 2018 (aged 71)
- Nickname: Executioner from Paedriew; Grateful Fighter
- Height: 170 cm (5 ft 7 in)
- Division: Featherweight; Lightweight
- Style: Muay Thai
- Stance: Southpaw

Kasem Prapaisri (December 2, 1946 – December 2, 1946), known professionally as Sirimongkol Luksiripat (Thai: ศิริมงคล ลูกศิริพัฒน์), was a Thai professional Muay Thai fighter. He was a two-division Lumpinee Stadium champion who was famous during the 1970s.

== Biography and career ==
Kasem Prapaisri was born in 1946 in Paedriew, Chachoengsao Province, once classmate with famous promotor Songchai Rattanasuban he had his first Muay Thai fight at the age of 17 using the ring name "Sukkasem Luksiyaek". During his second fight in his native province Kasem beat Usmannoi Luklong by knockout, Usmannoi would die from the injury sustained during the fight. The media reported on that event and he was dubbed "the Executionner from Padriew", it's with this reputation that he came to fight in Bangkok with very little experience using the ring name "Sukkasem Sor.Sanguansak". He lost his Bangkok debut in the first round. Victim of stage fright, the referee stopped the action thinking he was throwing the fight, his skillset not matching his reputation. He had to go back fighting in the provinces as he got banned from Rajadamnern Stadium. After a few wins he convinced the officials that he wasn't the kind of fighter to take dives and was welcomed back.

With a new promotor he went back to compete in Bangkok using his famous ring name "Sirimongkol Luksiripat". Under the Petchyindee promotion Sirimongkol started to rack up wins in the major stadiums. During his fighting career Sirimongkol gave a share of every purse he got to the family of the fighter he killed in the ring.

As a skilled southpaw he was one of the most dominant fighter of the Muay Thai circuit between 1969 and 1975 with wins over top fighters such as Vicharnnoi Porntawee, Kongdej Lukbangplasoi, Wichit Lukbangplasoi, Fahsai Taweechai, Bundit Singprakarn, Toshio Fujiwara. He was a two weight Lumpinee Stadium champion at 126 and 135 lbs. During this period Sirimongkol received purses as high as 100,000 baht.
Towards the end of his fighting career Sirimongkol competed in Japan multiple times. He retired in 1980 and went to teach in Japan for multiple years. Back in Thailand he worked for a travel company accommodating Japanese tourists.

Sirimongkol died on August 18, 2018, from a pulmonary oedema at the age of 71.

== Titles and accomplishments ==
=== Muay Thai ===
- Lumpinee Stadium
  - 1970 Lumpinee Stadium Featherweight (126 lbs) Champion
  - 1974 Lumpinee Stadium Lightweight (135 lbs) Champion (1 defense)

=== Amateur boxing ===
- 1973 King's Royal Cup (gold)

Awards

- 1972 King's Fighter of the Year
- 1973 Sports Writers Association Amateur Athlete of the Year
- Siam Sport Awards Hall of Fame (Muay Thai)

== Muay Thai record ==
Muay Thai Record (incomplete)
Date	Result	Opponent	Event	Location	Method	Round	Time
-	Win	(Japan) Tsuchiya		Tokyo, Japan	KO	4	
1977-12-31	Loss	(Japan) Masanobu Sato		Tokyo, Japan	KO		
Sirimongkol was stripped of his Lumpinee title back in Thailand for losing by knockout in a non-title fight.
1976-11-02	Win	(Thailand) Monsawan Lukchiangmai	Lumpinee Stadium	Bangkok, Thailand	Decision	5	3:00
Defends the Lumpinee Stadium Lightweight (135 lbs) title.
1976-	Win	(Thailand) Apidej Sit-Hirun		Bangkok, Thailand	TKO (Doctor stoppage)	2	
1976-07-06		(Thailand) Permsiri Rungrit	Lumpinee Stadium	Bangkok, Thailand			
1976-04-23	Loss	(Thailand) Satanfah Sor.Prateep	Lumpinee Stadium	Bangkok, Thailand	Decision	5	3:00
1976-04-04	Loss	(Thailand) Satanfah Sor.Prateep	Lumpinee Stadium	Bangkok, Thailand	TKO (Referee stoppage)	5	
1976-03-08	Win	(Japan) Toshio Fujiwara	Rajadamnern Stadium	Bangkok, Thailand	Decision	5	3:00
1976-02-01	Win	(Thailand) Mehmood Lukbothong		Hat Yai, Thailand	Decision	5	3:00
1975-12-23	Loss	(Thailand) Pudpadnoi Worawut	Lumpinee Stadium	Bangkok, Thailand	Decision	5	3:00
1975-11-04	Loss	(Thailand) Chalermpon Sor.Thai-it	Lumpinee Stadium	Bangkok, Thailand	Decision	5	3:00
1975-08-29	Win	(Thailand) Wankaew Sityodtong	Lumpinee Stadium	Bangkok, Thailand	Decision	5	3:00
1975-07-25	Win	(Thailand) Chalermpon Sor.Thai-it	Lumpinee Stadium	Bangkok, Thailand	Decision	5	3:00
1975-06-13	Win	(Thailand) Wankaew Sityodtong	Lumpinee Stadium	Bangkok, Thailand	Decision	5	3:00
Defends the Lumpinee Stadium Lightweight (135 lbs) title.
1975-03-31	Loss	(Thailand) Ruengsak Porntawee	Rajadamnern Stadium	Bangkok, Thailand	Decision	5	3:00
1975-02-07	Loss	(Thailand) Bundit Singprakarn	Lumpinee Stadium	Bangkok, Thailand	Decision	5	3:00
1975-01-07	Loss	(Thailand) Wichit Lukbangplasoi	Lumpinee Stadium	Bangkok, Thailand	Decision	5	3:00
1974-11-22	Win	(Thailand) Bangmod Lukbangkho	Lumpinee Stadium	Bangkok, Thailand	Decision	5	3:00
1974-10-01	Win	(Thailand) Bundit Singprakarn	Lumpinee Stadium	Bangkok, Thailand	Decision	5	3:00
1974-08-12	Win	(Thailand) Karwak Kwanchaichonrabut		Bangkok, Thailand	Decision	5	3:00
1974-07-02	Win	(Thailand) Kongdej Lukbangplasoi		Bangkok, Thailand	Decision	5	3:00
1974-05-14	Loss	(Thailand) Saensak Muangsurin	Lumpinee Stadium	Bangkok, Thailand	KO (Left Cross)	2	
1974-04-19	Win	(Thailand) Phayakphoom Phayakkhao	Lumpinee Stadium	Bangkok, Thailand	KO (Punch)	2	
Wins the vacant Lumpinee Stadium Lightweight (135 lbs) title.
1973-10-26	Win	(Thailand) Wichannoi Porntawee	Lumpinee Stadium	Bangkok, Thailand	Decision	5	3:00
1973-09-07	Loss	(Thailand) Poot Lorlek	Huamark Stadium	Bangkok, Thailand	Decision	5	3:00
1973-06-06	Win	(Thailand) Kongdej Lukbangplasoi	Lumpinee Stadium	Bangkok, Thailand	Decision	5	3:00
1973-01-12	Win	(Thailand) Han Silathong	Lumpinee Stadium	Bangkok, Thailand	TKO	1	
1972-12-12	Win	(Thailand) Han Silathong	Lumpinee Stadium	Bangkok, Thailand	KO	1	
1972-09-12	Win	(Thailand) Sichang Sakhonphitak	Lumpinee Stadium	Bangkok, Thailand	Decision	5	3:00
1972-07-21	Loss	(Thailand) Han Silathong	Lumpinee Stadium	Bangkok, Thailand	Decision	5	3:00
1972-05-05	Win	(Thailand) Pansak Kiatcharoenchai	Lumpinee Stadium	Bangkok, Thailand	Decision	5	3:00
Wins 170,000 baht side-bet.
1972-03-17	Win	(Thailand) Khonmek Kachapichit	Lumpinee Stadium	Bangkok, Thailand	KO (Left hook)	4	
1972-01-31	Win	(Thailand) Wichannoi Porntawee		Bangkok, Thailand	Decision	5	3:00
1971-11-26	Win	(Thailand) Pansak Kiatcharoenchai	Lumpinee Stadium	Bangkok, Thailand	Decision	5	3:00
1971-10-29	Win	(Thailand) Fahsai Taweechai	Lumpinee Stadium	Bangkok, Thailand	Decision	5	3:00
1971-09-20	Win	(Thailand) Singhao Sor.Lukphithak	Rajadamnern Stadium	Bangkok, Thailand	Decision	5	3:00
1971-06-08	Loss	(Thailand) Han Silathong	Lumpinee Stadium	Bangkok, Thailand	Decision	5	3:00
1971-05-11	Loss	(Thailand) Sichang Sakornpitak	Lumpinee Stadium	Bangkok, Thailand	Decision	5	3:00
1971-04-02	Win	(Thailand) Montien Muangsurin	Kittikhachorn Stadium	Bangkok, Thailand	Decision	5	3:00
1971-	Win	(Thailand) Denthoranee Muangsurin	Lumpinee Stadium	Bangkok, Thailand	Decision	5	3:00
1971-	Win	(Thailand) Wisan Kriengkraiyuk	Lumpinee Stadium	Bangkok, Thailand	KO	1	
1971-01-05	Win	(Thailand) Sornakrob Kiatwayupak	Lumpinee Stadium	Bangkok, Thailand	Decision	5	3:00
1971-10-16	Loss	(Thailand) Sichang Sakornpitak	Lumpinee Stadium	Bangkok, Thailand	Decision	5	3:00
1970-	Draw	(Thailand) Sanchainoi Thetthai	Lumpinee Stadium	Bangkok, Thailand	Decision	5	3:00
1970-	Win	(Thailand) Anantakorn Sor.Lukmuangrat	Lumpinee Stadium	Bangkok, Thailand	Decision	5	3:00
Wins the Lumpinee Stadium Featherweight (126 lbs) title.
1970-06-19	Loss	(Thailand) Fahsai Taweechai	Lumpinee Stadium	Bangkok, Thailand	Decision	5	3:00
1970-04-29	Win	(Thailand) Wichannoi Porntawee	Lumpinee Stadium	Bangkok, Thailand	Decision	5	3:00
1969-11-07	Win	(Thailand) Norasing Lolita	Lumpinee Stadium	Bangkok, Thailand	TKO (Elbow)	5	
1969-03-21	NC	(Thailand) Saknarongchai Luksrimongkol	Lumpinee Stadium	Bangkok, Thailand	Saknarongchai dismissed	3	
1969-01-31	Win	(Thailand) Nanna Muangsurin	Lumpinee Stadium	Bangkok, Thailand	TKO (Doctor stoppage)	4	
1968-10-18	Loss	(Thailand) Duangjai Sor.Chaimongkol	Lumpinee Stadium	Bangkok, Thailand	Decision	5	3:00
1965-03-11	Win	(Thailand) Han Silathong	Lumpinee Stadium	Bangkok, Thailand	TKO (Punches)	1	
1964-	Loss	(Thailand) Sentek Wongwianyai	Lumpinee Stadium	Bangkok, Thailand	Referee Stoppage	1	
Sirimongkol's first fight in Bangkok.
Legend: Win Loss Draw/No contest Notes

== See more ==
- List of Muay Thai practitioners
