= Vichit Praianan =

Thai former professional Muay Thai fighter and amateur boxer

Vichit Praiana
- Born: 16 October 1951 (age 75); Chonburi, Thailand
- Nickname: White Shark (ฉลามขาว)
- Height: 175 cm (5 ft 9 in)
- Division: Lightweight
- Style: Muay Thai, Boxing
- Stance: Southpaw

Vichit Praianan (born 16 October 1951), known professionally as Wichit Lukbangplasoi (Thai: วิชิต ลูกบางปลาสร้อย), is a Thai former professional Muay Thai fighter and amateur boxer. He is a former Lumpinee Stadium Super Featherweight Champion in Muay Thai and a silver medalist in boxing at the Asian Games and Asian Boxing Championships. He participated to the 1972 Summer Olympics as a lightweight, where he lost to James Busceme.

== Biography and career ==
Vichit was born on 16 October 1951 in the Chonburi province where he started to train in Muay Thai at the age of 13 influenced by his older brother.

== Titles and accomplishments ==
=== Muay Thai ===
- 1974 Lumpinee Stadium Super Featherweight (130 lbs) Champion

== Muay Thai record ==
Muay Thai Record
Date	Result	Opponent	Event	Location	Method	Round	Time
1978-09-22	Loss	(Thailand) Chongjaroen Sakwittaya	Lumpinee Stadium	Bangkok, Thailand	KO (Elbow)	4	
1978-07-28	Loss	(Thailand) Santi Rekchai	Lumpinee Stadium	Bangkok, Thailand	Decision	5	3:00
1978-	Win	(Thailand) Siangnow Sitbangprachan		Bangkok, Thailand	Decision	5	3:00
1978-01-27	Loss	(Thailand) Posai Sitiboonlert	Lumpinee Stadium	Bangkok, Thailand	Decision	5	3:00
1977-09-23	Loss	(Thailand) Wichannoi Porntawee	Lumpinee Stadium	Bangkok, Thailand	Decision	5	3:00
1977-07-19	Loss	(Thailand) Phongdetnoi Prasopchai	Lumpinee Stadium	Bangkok, Thailand	Decision	5	3:00
1977-05-27	Win	(Thailand) Poot Lorlek	Lumpinee Stadium	Bangkok, Thailand	Decision	5	3:00
1977-03-11	Loss	(Thailand) Jitti Muangkhonkaen	Lumpinee Stadium	Bangkok, Thailand	Decision	5	3:00
1977-	Win	(Thailand) Wangprai Rojosongkram		Bangkok, Thailand	Decision	5	3:00
1976-11-04	Loss	(Thailand) Chalermpon Sor.Tha-it	Rajadamnern Stadium	Bangkok, Thailand	KO (Punch)	3	
1976-05-14	NC	(Thailand) Posai Sitiboonlert	Lumpinee Stadium	Bangkok, Thailand	Vichit dismissed	5	
For the Lumpinee Stadium Super Featherweight (130 lbs) title. The referee asked Vichit to leave the ring judging that he wasn't fighting up to his capacities.
1976-03-02	Loss	(Thailand) Poot Lorlek	Lumpinee Stadium	Bangkok, Thailand	Decision	5	3:00
1976-01-30	Loss	(Thailand) Pudpadnoi Worawut	Huamark Stadium	Bangkok, Thailand	Decision	5	3:00
1975-08-29	Win	(Thailand) Vicharnnoi Porntawee	Lumpinee Stadium	Bangkok, Thailand	Decision	5	3:00
1975-06-19	Win	(Thailand) Prayut	Rajadamnern Stadium	Bangkok, Thailand	Prayuth dismissed		
1975-02-11	Loss	(Thailand) Poot Lorlek	Huamark Stadium	Bangkok, Thailand	Decision	5	3:00
1975-01-07	Win	(Thailand) Sirimongkol Luksiripat	Lumpinee Stadium	Bangkok, Thailand	Decision	5	3:00
1974-10-15	Win	(Thailand) Khunponnoi Kiatsuriya	Lumpinee Stadium	Bangkok, Thailand	Decision	5	3:00
Wins the Lumpinee Stadium Super Featherweight (130 lbs) title.
1974-08-02	Win	(Thailand) Permsiri Rungrit	Lumpinee Stadium	Bangkok, Thailand	Decision	5	3:00
1974-	Win	(Thailand) Weerachat Sorndaeng	Lumpinee Stadium	Bangkok, Thailand	Decision	5	3:00
1974-	Win	(Thailand) Chaiyut Sithiboonlert	Lumpinee Stadium	Bangkok, Thailand	Decision	5	3:00
1974-	Win	(Thailand) Ritthidet Singmorakot		Chonburi province, Thailand	Decision	5	3:00
1974-	Win	(Thailand) Samandet Itthichai		Chonburi province, Thailand	Decision	5	3:00
1974-	Win	(Thailand) Chanrit Chaomongkut		Chachoengsao province, Thailand	Decision	5	3:00
1972-12-04	Win	(Thailand) Pornpisanu Hor Mahachai	Rajadamnern Stadium	Bangkok, Thailand	Decision	5	3:00
1971-04-13	Loss	(Thailand) Saensak Muangsurin	Lumpinee Stadium	Bangkok, Thailand	TKO (Punches)	1	
1971-03-24	Loss	(Thailand) Saensak Muangsurin		Chonburi province, Thailand	TKO	1	
Legend: Win Loss Draw/No contest Notes

== See more ==
- List of Muay Thai practitioners
