= Saensak Muangsurin =

Thai professional Muay Thai fighter and boxer (1950–2009)

- Saensak in 1976
- Born: Boonsong Mansri; August 13, 1950; Ban Sadiang, Mueang Phetchabun, Phetchabun, Thailand
- Died: April 16, 2009 (aged 58); Rajvithi Hospital, Bangkok, Thailand
- Native name: แสนศักดิ์ เมืองสุรินทร์
- Nickname: World Collapsing Southpaw (ซ้ายทลายโลก); Pink Southpaw (ซ้ายสีชมพู)
- Height: 170 cm (5 ft 7 in)
- Weight: Super lightweight Welterweight
- Style: Muay Thai (Muay Mat)
- Stance: Southpaw

Professional boxing record
- Total: 20
- Wins: 14
- By knockout: 11
- Losses: 6

Boonsong Mansri (Thai: บุญส่ง มั่นศรี; 13 August 1950 – 16 April 2009), known professionally as Saensak Muangsurin (Thai: แสนศักดิ์ เมืองสุรินทร์), was a Thai professional Muay Thai fighter and boxer. He was a Lumpinee Stadium super-lightweight champion in Muay Thai, as well as a WBC super-lightweight world champion in boxing. In 1975, he won a major world boxing title in his third professional fight, 241 days after his debut, which is still the record over 50 years later (later matched by Vasiliy Lomachenko in 2014 in terms of number of bouts). He is also Thailand's heaviest world boxing champion to date. Nicknamed the "World Collapsing Southpaw," he is often regarded as one of the most fearsome punchers in Muay Thai history.

== Biography ==
Prior to his boxing career, Muangsurin first started out in Muay Thai. At the beginning of his career, he used the ring names "Saensaep Petchcharoen" (แสนแสบ เพชรเจริญ) and "Saepsuang Petchcharoen" (แสบทรวง เพชรเจริญ) as he was fighting in his native province and the neighboring ones. He also fought numerous times in Japan.

A very popular fighter in his time, Muangsurin faced many top Muay Thai fighters such as Poot Lorlek, Vicharnnoi Porntawee, Pudpadnoi Worawut, Khunpon Sakornpitak, Wisan Kraigriengyuk, Kongdej Lookbangplasroy, and Sirimongkol Luksiripat. He won the Lumpinee Stadium super-lightweight title by knocking out Sorrasak Sor Lukbookalo in just the first round in 1971.

In addition to his professional Muay Thai career, he was also an amateur boxer. He notably competed at the 7th Southeast Asian Peninsular Games in Singapore in 1973, making news every time he won by RSC all the way to winning the gold medal in the welterweight division.

Muangsurin made his formal professional boxing debut on November 16, 1974, with a first-round knockout win. He won his second fight in February 1975 by technical knockout in round seven, and challenged Perico Fernandez for the WBC super-lightweight title in his third professional fight. He defeated Fernandez by technical knockout in the eighth round on July 15, 1975, setting a hitherto unbeaten world record for the quickest major world-title victory in boxing history; it had been less than a year since he made his debut in 1974.

Muangsurin lost his world title in his second defense against Miguel Velasquez after being disqualified in the 5th round, but he quickly regained it four months later on October 29, 1976, by knocking out Velázquez in two rounds. He successfully defended the WBC belt seven times (eight total, including his defense prior to the disqualification against Velázquez), most notably against former WBC lightweight champion Guts Ishimatsu, whom he knocked out in six rounds.

He was knocked out by Sang-hyun Kim in the 13th round to lose his world title on December 30, 1978. He failed to replicate his earlier success after this, losing all but one of his next five bouts; one of these was a third-round knockout loss to Thomas Hearns in 1979. His lone victory in this period was a fifth-round TKO over Mike DeGuzman of the Philippines in 1980. His last professional fight was against Chung-jae Hwang for the OPBF welterweight title, which he lost by unanimous decision over 12 rounds. His record was 14–6–0 (11 KOs).

In 2014, Vasyl Lomachenko tied his record, winning a world title in his third bout. Muangsurin still holds the record for the fastest time to a world title after a professional debut, having taken 11 days fewer than the Ukrainian.

In addition, he also served as the inspiration for the Muay Thai fighter character, Krut Muangsurin (lit. 'garuda'), in the Japanese manga Jinnai-ryu Jujutsu Rurouden Majima-kun Suttobasu!! by Makoto Niwano.

== Personal life and death ==
At the height of his career, Muangsurin was by all accounts a celebrity in his country. He was regarded as a kind of movie star and often toured the provinces, appearing on stage alongside famous luk thung singers throughout the nation. He married a popular actress of that era, Prim Prapaporn. The couple was constantly in the spotlight, attracting the attention of both the media and the general public. They have one son, whom he named Kriangsak "King" Mansri, after General Kriangsak Chamanan, who was prime minister at the time.

He accrued numerous injuries over the course of his career; by the time he had retired, he was blind in his right eye. Prapaporn later divorced him, and his savings of up to 10 million baht were exhausted. In 1998, several years after hanging up his gloves, he gave an open interview to World of Boxing magazine, stating that he had been cheated by many people in the boxing industry, and according to his biography, he was also known to have been extravagant with money. His last fight was for the OPBF welterweight title against Chung-jae Hwang of South Korea in Roi Et, in which he promoted the fight himself, suffered a financial loss, and ultimately lost on points after 12 rounds. After retiring from boxing, he even ran for a seat in the House of Representatives in his hometown of Phetchabun in 1983 as an independent candidate, but was not elected. Though he had a monthly courtesy from the WBC and other authorities in Thailand, it was not enough to cover costs, and the rest of his life remained difficult.

Muangsurin was admitted to Rajvithi Hospital on April 12, 2009, for liver failure and intestinal blockage. Surgery failed to improve his condition, which was complicated by various other ailments. On April 16, Saensak died while under observation in an intensive care unit.

== Titles and accomplishments ==
=== Muay Thai ===
- Lumpinee Stadium
  - 1971 Lumpinee Stadium Super Lightweight (140 lbs) Champion

Awards

- 1973 King's Muay Thai Fighter of the Year

=== Boxing ===
- World Boxing Council
  - 1975 WBC Super Lightweight (140 lbs) Champion (1 defense)
  - 1976 WBC Super Lightweight (140 lbs) Champion (7 defenses)

== Professional boxing record ==
20 fights	14 wins	6 losses
By knockout	11	2
By decision	3	3
By disqualification	0	1

Result	Record	Opponent	Type	Round, time	Date	Location	Notes
Loss	14–6	(South Korea) Chung-jae Hwang	MD	12	1981-04-05	Roi-Et, Thailand	For OPBF welterweight title
Loss	14–5	(Spain) Andoni Amana	UD	10	1980-11-13	Bilbao, País Vasco, Spain	
Win	14–4	(Philippines) Mike DeGuzman	TKO	5 (10)	1980-09-30	Jirapravat Stadium, Nakhon Sawan, Thailand	
Loss	13–4	(United States) Thomas Hearns	TKO	3 (10)	1979-10-18	Olympia Stadium, Detroit, Michigan, United States	
Loss	13–3	(Philippines) Dan DeGuzman	SD	10	1979-07-20	Manila, Philippines	
Loss	13–2	(South Korea) Sang-hyun Kim	TKO	13 (15)	1978-12-30	Munhwa Gymnasium, Seoul, South Korea	Lost WBC super-lightweight title
Win	13–1	(Venezuela) Francisco Moreno	TKO	13 (15)	1978-04-08	Municipality Stadium, Hat Yai, Thailand	Retained WBC super-lightweight title
Win	12–1	(France) Jo Kimpuani	TKO	14 (15)	1977-12-30	Tung Na-Chai Stadium, Chantaburi, Thailand	Retained WBC super-lightweight title
Win	11–1	(United States) Saoul Mamby	SD	15	1977-10-23	Open-Air Stadium, Nakhon Ratchasima, Thailand	Retained WBC super-lightweight title
Win	10–1	(United States) Mike Everett	TKO	6 (15)	1977-08-20	Open-Air Stadium, Roi Et, Thailand	Retained WBC super-lightweight title
Win	9–1	(Spain) Perico Fernandez	UD	15	1977-06-17	Palacio de los Deportes, Madrid, Spain	Retained WBC super-lightweight title
Win	8–1	(Japan) Guts Ishimatsu	KO	6 (15)	1977-04-02	Kokugikan, Tokyo, Japan	Retained WBC super-lightweight title
Win	7–1	(United States) Monroe Brooks	TKO	15 (15)	1977-01-15	Open-Air Stadium, Chiang Mai, Thailand	Retained WBC super-lightweight title
Win	6–1	(Spain) Miguel Velazquez	TKO	2 (15)	1976-10-29	Hermanos Maristas Sports Pavilion, Segovia, Castilla y León, Spain	Won WBC super-lightweight title
Loss	5–1	(Spain) Miguel Velazquez	DQ	4 (15)	1976-06-30	Palacio de los Deportes, Madrid, Spain	Lost WBC super-lightweight title
Win	5–0	(Japan) Lion Furuyama	UD	15	1976-01-25	Nihon University, Tokyo, Japan	Retained WBC super-lightweight title
Win	4–0	(Philippines) Ely Yares	KO	6 (10)	1975-12-13	Hua Mark Stadium, Bangkok, Thailand	
Win	3–0	(Spain) Perico Fernandez	KO	8 (15)	1975-07-15	Hua Mark Stadium, Bangkok, Thailand	Won WBC super-lightweight title
Win	2–0	(Japan) Lion Furuyama	TKO	7 (10)	1975-02-16	Hua Mark Stadium, Bangkok, Thailand	
Win	1–0	(Philippines) Rudy Barro	KO	1 (10)	1974-11-16	Hua Mark Stadium, Bangkok, Thailand	

== Muay Thai record ==
Muay Thai Record (incomplete)
Date	Result	Opponent	Event	Location	Method	Round	Time
1974-10-08	Loss	(Thailand) Poot Lorlek	Lumpinee Stadium	Bangkok, Thailand	Decision	5	3:00
1974-08-22	Win	(Thailand) Wichannoi Porntawee	Rajadamnern Stadium	Bangkok, Thailand	KO (Punches)	3	
1974-07-12	Win	(Thailand) Poot Lorlek	Lumpinee Stadium	Bangkok, Thailand	Decision	5	3:00
1974-05-14	Win	(Thailand) Sirimongkol Luksiripat	Lumpinee Stadium	Bangkok, Thailand	KO	2	
1974-05-01	Win	(Thailand) Wannarong Peeramit	Rajadamnern Stadium	Bangkok, Thailand	KO	3	
1974-03-28	Win	(Singapore) Tae Yien-chen	Kung Fu vs Muay Thai, Rajadamnern Stadium	Bangkok, Thailand	KO (head kick)	2	1:20
1974-03-12	Loss	(Thailand) Poot Lorlek	Lumpinee Stadium	Bangkok, Thailand	Decision	5	3:00
1974-02-13	Win	(Thailand) Khunpon Sakornphitak	Lumpinee Stadium	Bangkok, Thailand	KO (Punches)	2	
1973-11-27	Win	(Japan) Yoshimitsu Tamashiro	AJKA	Tokyo, Japan	KO (Knee to the body)	2	
1973-11-12	Win	(Thailand) Karawek Kwanjairuang	Rajadamnern Stadium	Bangkok, Thailand	Decision	5	3:00
1973-10-27	Win	(Thailand) Huasai Sittiboonlert	Huamark Stadium	Bangkok, Thailand	KO	2	
1973-08-15	Win	(Thailand) Kongdej Lukbangplasoi	Rajadamnern Stadium	Bangkok, Thailand	KO (Punches)	1	
1973-04-03	Win	(Thailand) Buriram Sun Misakawan	Huamark Stadium	Bangkok, Thailand	KO	1	
1973-02-09	Loss	(Thailand) Poot Lorlek	Huamark Stadium	Bangkok, Thailand	Decision	5	3:00
1972-10-25	Win	(Thailand) Khunpon Sakornphitak	Rajadamnern Stadium	Bangkok, Thailand	Decision	5	3:00
1972-09-29	Loss	(Thailand) Wichannoi Porntawee	Huamark Stadium	Bangkok, Thailand	Decision	5	3:00
1972-08-01	Win	(Thailand) Wichannoi Porntawee	Lumpinee Stadium	Bangkok, Thailand	Decision	5	3:00
1972-05-15	Win	(Thailand) Vison Kraigreangyuk	Lumpinee Stadium	Bangkok, Thailand	Decision	5	3:00
1971-11-30	Win	(Thailand) Sorasak Sor.Lukbukkalo	Lumpinee Stadium	Bangkok, Thailand	KO (Punches)	1	
Wins the Lumpinee Stadium Super Lightweight (140 lbs) title.
1971-10-29	Win	(Thailand) Thongbai Charoenmuang	Lumpinee Stadium	Bangkok, Thailand	TKO (Doctor Stoppage)	3	
1971-09-24	Win	(Thailand) Tamildong Luk-U-Thong	Lumpinee Stadium	Bangkok, Thailand	KO (Punches)	2	
1971-08-24	Win	(Thailand) Rittisak Sophy		Bangkok, Thailand	TKO	2	
1971-06-19	Win	(Thailand) Suwitnoi Lukbangplasoi	Lumpinee Stadium	Bangkok, Thailand	Decision	5	3:00
1971-05-11	Win	(Thailand) Charnritnoi Lookbangplasoy		Bangkok, Thailand	TKO	3	
1971-04-13	Win	(Thailand) Wichit Lukbangplasoi	Lumpinee Stadium	Bangkok, Thailand	TKO (Punches)	1	
1971-03-24	Win	(Thailand) Wichit Lukbangplasoi		Chonburi province, Thailand	TKO	1	
1971-02-26	Loss	(Thailand) Surakan Klongphajon	Lumpinee Stadium	Bangkok, Thailand	Decision	5	3:00
1971-02-07	Loss	(Thailand) Thongsuriya Isaraphap		Phetchaburi province, Thailand	KO	1	
1971-01-10	Win	(Thailand) Runganan Napapol		Bangkok, Thailand	Decision	5	3:00
1970-12-16	Win	(Thailand) Adisak Weerawat	Rajadamnern Stadium	Bangkok, Thailand	Decision	5	3:00
1970-11-20	Loss	(Thailand) Khirisak Luksiripat	Lumpinee Stadium	Bangkok, Thailand	Decision	5	3:00
1970-10-14	Win	(Thailand) Isarayuth Timlaend	Rajadamnern Stadium	Bangkok, Thailand	TKO	4	
1970-09-27	Win	(Thailand) Hansa Surakorsang	Rajadamnern Stadium	Bangkok, Thailand	Decision	5	3:00
1970-09-06	Win	(Thailand) Singdon Kiatpracharat	Rajadamnern Stadium	Bangkok, Thailand	KO	4	
1970-08-12	Win	(Thailand) Samran Bangyikhan	Rajadamnern Stadium	Bangkok, Thailand	TKO	2	
1970-07-22	Win	(Thailand) Yod Saksuwan	Rajadamnern Stadium	Bangkok, Thailand	TKO	1	
1970-06-28	Win	(Thailand) Phichisuk Changyon	Rajadamnern Stadium	Bangkok, Thailand	Decision	5	3:00
1970-05-21	Win	(Thailand) Sakchon Sophy	Rajadamnern Stadium	Bangkok, Thailand	KO	3	
1970-04-20	Win	(Thailand) Pinai Sornphajon	Rajadamnern Stadium	Bangkok, Thailand	TKO	4	
1970-03-30	Win	(Thailand) Kraingern Lukakatyothin	Rajadamnern Stadium	Bangkok, Thailand	KO	3	
1970-03-02	Win	(Thailand) Sriamnuay Sornprasit	Rajadamnern Stadium	Bangkok, Thailand	TKO	5	
1970-02-09	Win	(Thailand) Pokaew Sitsripai	Rajadamnern Stadium	Bangkok, Thailand	Decision	5	3:00
1970-01-06	Win	(Thailand) Phanomchai Sor Uthai	Rajadamnern Stadium	Bangkok, Thailand	KO (Punches)	1	
Legend: Win Loss Draw/No contest Notes

== See also ==
- List of WBC world champions
- List of super lightweight boxing champions

Preceded by Perico Fernandez	WBC Light welterweight Champion; July 15, 1975 - June 30, 1976	Succeeded by Miguel Velasquez
Preceded by Miguel Velasquez	WBC Light welterweight Champion; October 29, 1976 - December 30, 1978	Succeeded by Sang Hyun Kim
