= Neth Saknarong =

Thai former professional Muay Thai fighter

- Born: Weeranet Nakain; November 6, 1954 (age 71); Phang Khon, Sakon Nakhon, Thailand
- Nickname: Star from Phang Khon (คนดังพังโคน)
- Height: 1.70 m (5 ft 7 in)
- Division: Super Featherweight
- Style: Muay Thai
- Stance: Southpaw
- Team: Saknarong
- Trainer: Go Hong

Other information
- Occupation: Muay Thai trainer

Weeranet Nakain (born November 6, 1954), known professionally as Neth Saknarong (Thai: เนตร ศักดิ์ณรงค์), is a Thai former professional Muay Thai fighter who competed in the 1970s.

== Biography and career ==
Neth started training in Muay Thai at the age of 14 with a trainer in his native village of Pang Khon. Neth then joined the Therdkiatpitak camp where he became a young phenom in the northeast regions of Thailand by winning 30 fights in a row. At 17 years old Neth made his debut in Bangkok and joined the Saknarong camp.

During the 1970s Neth became a renowned fighter with powerful weapons from the southpaw stance. He was ranked highly in both the Rajadamnern and Lumpinee Stadiums and defeated many notable Thai champions of his era such as Posai Sitiboonlert, Pudpadnoi Worawut, Poot Lorlek, Khunponnoi Kiatsuriya, Vicharnnoi Porntawee. Neth also traveled to Los Angeles where he defeated the American WKA world champion Earnest Hart Jr by knockout in 1977.

Neth retired from the Bangkok circuit in 1978 following a loss to Satanfah Sor.Prateep. In 1988 He was invited to compete in Paris where he defeated European champion Mustapha Benatia by knockout, Neth then settled in France where he has been a teacher for over 30 years.

== Muay Thai record ==
Muay Thai Record (incomplete)
Date	Result	Opponent	Event	Location	Method	Round	Time
1988-06-11	Loss	(Netherlands) Ivan Hippolyte	Champions in Action	Amsterdam, Netherlands	TKO (Punches)	2	
1988-02-26	Win	(France) Mustapha Benatia	Trophée des Champions	Paris, France	KO		
1978-09-30	Loss	(Thailand) Satanfah Sor.Prateep	Lumpinee Stadium	Bangkok, Thailand	TKO	2	
1977-08-25	Loss	(Thailand) Wichannoi Porntawee		Bangkok, Thailand	Decision	5	3:00
1977-06-02	Loss	(Thailand) Ruengsak Porntawee	Rajadamnern Stadium	Bangkok, Thailand	Decision	5	3:00
1977-03-12	Win	(United States) Earnest Hart Jr	WKA	Los Angeles, US	KO (Left cross)	5	
?	Loss	(Thailand) Santi Rekchai		Bangkok, Thailand	Decision	5	3:00
1976-11-11	Win	(Thailand) Wichannoi Porntawee	Rajadamnern Stadium	Bangkok, Thailand	Decision	5	3:00
1976-10-05	Loss	(Thailand) Posai Sitiboonlert	Lumpinee Stadium	Bangkok, Thailand	Decision	5	3:00
1976-08-31	Draw	(Thailand) Posai Sitiboonlert	Lumpinee Stadium	Bangkok, Thailand	Decision	5	3:00
1976-06-16	Win	(Thailand) Khunponnoi Kiatsuriya	Rajadamnern Stadium	Bangkok, Thailand	Decision	5	3:00
1976-05-14	Loss	(Thailand) Poot Lorlek	Rajadamnern Stadium	Bangkok, Thailand	Decision	5	3:00
1976-03-25	Win	(Thailand) Poot Lorlek	Rajadamnern Stadium	Bangkok, Thailand	Decision	5	3:00
1976-02-26	Win	(Thailand) Pudpadnoi Worawut	Rajadamnern Stadium	Bangkok, Thailand	Decision	5	3:00
1976-01-20	Win	(Thailand) Posai Sitiboonlert	Lumpinee Stadium	Bangkok, Thailand	Decision	5	3:00
1975-11-12	Loss	(Thailand) Wichannoi Porntawee	Rajadamnern Stadium	Bangkok, Thailand	Decision	5	3:00
1975-09-12	Loss	(Thailand) Pudpadnoi Worawut	Lumpinee Stadium	Bangkok, Thailand	Decision	5	3:00
1975-07-25	Win	(Thailand) Weerachat Sordaeng	Lumpinee Stadium	Bangkok, Thailand	Decision	5	3:00
1975-06-02	Win	(Thailand) Siprae Duagnprateep	Rajadamnern Stadium	Bangkok, Thailand	Decision	5	3:00
1975-04-03	Win	(Thailand) Wanarong Peeramit	Rajadamnern Stadium	Bangkok, Thailand	Decision	5	3:00
1975-02-13	Win	(Japan) Minoru Ota		Bangkok, Thailand	KO	2	
1974-10-11	Loss	(Thailand) Chalermphon Sor.Tha-it		Bangkok, Thailand	Decision	5	3:00
1974-09-05	Draw	(Thailand) Chalermphon Sor.Tha-it	Rajadamnern Stadium	Bangkok, Thailand	Decision	5	3:00
1974–	Loss	(Thailand) Chalermphon Sor.Tha-it		Bangkok, Thailand	Decision	5	3:00
1974-04-18	Loss	(Thailand) Muangchon Jirapan	Rajadamnern Stadium	Bangkok, Thailand	Decision	5	3:00
1974-03-28	Win	(Singapore) Yia Lee-lee	Kung Fu vs Muay Thai, Rajadamnern Stadium	Bangkok, Thailand	KO (Left hook)	1	
1974-03-01	Win	(Thailand) Sommai Ekayothin	Lumpinee Stadium	Bangkok, Thailand	Decision	5	3:00
1973–	Win	(Thailand) Jomtap Sakprasong	Rajadamnern Stadium	Bangkok, Thailand	Decision	5	3:00
Legend: Win Loss Draw/No contest Notes

== See more ==
- List of Muay Thai practitioners
