= Bundit Singprakarn =

Thai former professional Muay Thai fighter

- Born: Pradit Yuklad; August 14, 1956 (age 70); Samut Prakan, Thailand
- Other names: Bandit Singprakan
- Height: 170 cm (5 ft 7 in)
- Division: Featherweight
- Style: Muay Thai
- Stance: Orthodox
- Team: Singprakan Gym
- Years active: c. 1971-1981

Pradit Yuklad (born August 14, 1956), known professionally as Bundit Singprakarn (Thai: บรรดิษฐ์ สิงห์ปราการ), is a Thai former professional Muay Thai fighter. He is a former Lumpinee Stadium Featherweight Champion who was active during the 1970s.

== Biography and career ==
Bundit started to train at home with his father and was competing by the age of 15. He struggled in his first attempts in Bangkok where he was dismissed during two fights.

Bundit started to have success in the stadiums in 1971 with his strong middle kick style. A year later he won the Lumpinee Stadium 126 lbs title on December 8, 1972, against Denthoranee Muangsurin, he scored two knockdowns to win the belt by unanimous decision. He successfully defended his title and kept it until 1977 when he was dismissed during a fight against Sagat Pontawee. During the 1970s Bundit defeated many champions of his era such as Sirimongkol Luksiripat, Ruengsak Porntawee, Vicharnnoi Porntawee, Khunponnoi Kiatsuriya or Jocky Sitkanpai.

After his fighting career Bundit became a Muay Thai trainer both in Thailand and Japan. He later opened a restaurant in his native province.

== Titles and accomplishments ==
- Lumpinee Stadium
  - 1972 Lumpinee Stadium Featherweight (126 lbs) Champion (1 defense)

== Muay Thai record ==
Muay Thai Record
Date	Result	Opponent	Event	Location	Method	Round	Time
1981-	Win	(Thailand) Decha Lukprayachai		Bangkok, Thailand	Decision	5	3:00
1978-09-15	Loss	(Thailand) Wangprai Rojsongkram	Lumpinee Stadium	Bangkok, Thailand	KO	1	
1978-07-07	Loss	(Thailand) Fahkaew Surakorsang	Lumpinee Stadium	Bangkok, Thailand	KO (Punches)	4	
1978-05-25	Loss	(Thailand) Santi Rekchai	Lumpinee Stadium	Bangkok, Thailand			
1978-01-10	Loss	(Thailand) Sianhow Sit Bangprachan	Lumpinee Stadium	Bangkok, Thailand	Decision	5	3:00
1977-05-03	NC	(Thailand) Sagat Porntawee	Lumpinee Stadium	Bangkok, Thailand	Bundit dismissed	3	
Stripped of the Lumpinee Stadium Featherweight (126 lbs) title.
1977-01-28	Win	(Thailand) Vicharnnoi Porntawee	Rajadamnern Stadium	Bangkok, Thailand	Decision	5	3:00
1976-11-19	Win	(Thailand) Khunponnoi Kiatsuriya	Rajadamnern Stadium	Bangkok, Thailand	Decision	5	3:00
1976-07-08	Loss	(Thailand) Jitti Muangkhonkaen	Rajadamnern Stadium	Bangkok, Thailand	Decision	5	3:00
1976-05-21	Win	(Thailand) Jocky Sitkanpai	Sing Bangduan, Lumpinee Stadium	Bangkok, Thailand	Decision	5	3:00
1976-01-09	Loss	(Thailand) Chalermpol Sor-Thai-It	Kapanlek, Lumpinee Stadium	Bangkok, Thailand	Decision	5	3:00
1975-11-28	Loss	(Thailand) Poot Lorlek	Lumpinee Stadium	Bangkok, Thailand	Decision	5	3:00
1975-08-29	Win	(Thailand) Khunponnoi Kiatsuriya	Lumpinee Stadium	Bangkok, Thailand	Decision	5	3:00
1975-07-25	Win	(Thailand) Vicharnnoi Porntawee	Lumpinee Stadium	Bangkok, Thailand	Decision	5	3:00
1975-05-30	Win	(Thailand) Ruengsak Porntawee	Lumpinee Stadium	Bangkok, Thailand	Decision	5	3:00
1975-04-21	Win	(Thailand) Dejsakda Sornram		Nakhon Pathom, Thailand	Decision	5	3:00
1975-02-07	Win	(Thailand) Sirimongkol Luksiripat	Lumpinee Stadium	Bangkok, Thailand	Decision	5	3:00
1974-11-29	Win	(Thailand) Wannarong Peeramit	Lumpinee Stadium	Bangkok, Thailand	Decision	5	3:00
1974-10-01	Loss	(Thailand) Sirimongkol Luksiripat	Lumpinee Stadium	Bangkok, Thailand	Decision	5	3:00
1974-08-22	Loss	(Thailand) Pudpadnoi Worawut	Lumpinee Stadium	Bangkok, Thailand	Decision	5	3:00
1974-06-04	Win	(Thailand) Bangmod Lukbankho	Lumpinee Stadium	Bangkok, Thailand	Decision	5	3:00
1974-04-18	Loss	(Thailand) Bangmod Lukbankho	Rajadamnern Stadium	Bangkok, Thailand	Decision	5	3:00
1974-03-19	Loss	(Thailand) Khunponnoi Kiatsuriya	Lumpinee Stadium	Bangkok, Thailand	Decision	5	3:00
1974-01-22	Loss	(Thailand) Somsak Sor.Thewasoonthorn	Huamark Stadium	Bangkok, Thailand	Decision	5	3:00
1973-10-27	Win	(Thailand) Wannarong Peeramit	WBA Chionoi vs Hanagata, Huamark Stadium	Bangkok, Thailand	Decision	5	3:00
1973-08-17	Win	(Thailand) Kiattinin Lookphisit	Lumpinee Stadium	Bangkok, Thailand			
Defends the Lumpinee Stadium Featherweight (126 lbs) title.
1973-03-07	Win	(Thailand) Wannarong Peeramit	Chalermchai, Rajadamnern Stadium	Bangkok, Thailand	Decision	5	3:00
1973-01-23	Loss	(Thailand) Pudpadnoi Worawut	Lumpinee Stadium	Bangkok, Thailand	TKO (High kick)	3	
1972-12-08	Win	(Thailand) Denthoranee Muangsurin	Lumpinee Stadium	Bangkok, Thailand	Decision	5	3:00
Wins the vacant Lumpinee Stadium Featherweight (126 lbs) title.
1972-	Loss	(Thailand) Denthoranee Muangsurin	Lumpinee Stadium	Bangkok, Thailand	Decision	5	3:00
1972-07-14	Win	(Thailand) Nannam Muangsurin	Chao Siam, Lumpinee Stadium	Bangkok, Thailand	Decision	5	3:00
?	Win	(Thailand) Fahsai Taweechai	Lumpinee Stadium	Bangkok, Thailand	Decision	5	3:00
?	Win	(Thailand) Norasing Chalermchai	Lumpinee Stadium	Bangkok, Thailand	Decision	5	3:00
1972-02-11	Draw	(Thailand) Channarong Sakornpitak	Lumpinee Stadium	Bangkok, Thailand	Decision	5	3:00
1971-	Win	(Thailand) Suksawat Sritewet	Lumpinee Stadium	Bangkok, Thailand	Decision	5	3:00
Legend: Win Loss Draw/No contest Notes

== See more ==
- List of Muay Thai practitioners
