= Khunponnoi Kiatsuriya =

Thai former professional Muay Thai fighter

- Born: Tawatchai Prasartsilp; August 24, 1953; Pattani, Thailand
- Died: January 12, 2026 (aged 72)
- Other names: Khunponnoi Haphalang (ขุนพลน้อย ห้าพลัง)
- Height: 170 cm (5 ft 7 in)
- Division: Super Featherweight
- Style: Muay Thai
- Team: Kiatsuriya Gym
- Years active: c. 1965-1980

Tawatchai Prasartsilp (born August 24, 1953), known professionally as Khunponnoi Kiatsuriya (Thai: ขุนพลน้อย เกียรติสุริยา), is a Thai former professional Muay Thai fighter. He is a former Lumpinee Stadium Super Featherweight Champion who was active in the 1970s.

== Biography and career ==
Khunponnoi started training in May Thai at the age of 12 with his uncle, competing in Pattani and the neighbouring provinces. At 14 he followed his cousin Noppadej to the Kiatsuriya camp in Bangkok.

Khunponnoi reached the status of top fighter in just three years after moving to Bangkok, being matched up with elite opposition by 1974. He defeated Pudpadnoi Worawut by decision for the Lumpinee Stadium 130 lbs title on July 26, 1974. He lost his belt three months later to Wichit Lukbangplasoi. By the end of his career in 1980, he received purses as high as 100,000 baht and defeated many notable champions of his era such as Jocky Sitkanpai, Bundit Singprakarn, Narongnoi Kiatbandit or Saengsakda Kittikasem. Between 1979 and 1981 he was part of Royal Thai army police.

After his career Khunponnoi became a trainer in various camps in Thailand. Khunponnoi passed away on January 12, 2026, from a long illness.

== Titles and accomplishments ==
- Lumpinee Stadium
  - 1974 Lumpinee Stadium Super Featherweight (130 lbs) Champion

== Muay Thai record ==
Muay Thai Record
Date	Result	Opponent	Event	Location	Method	Round	Time
1980-	Win	(Thailand) Chaiyasit Luksamrong		Bangkok, Thailand	Decision	5	3:00
1979-12-07	Win	(Thailand) Sananpetch Kiatphet	Lumpinee Stadium	Bangkok, Thailand	Decision	5	3:00
1979-10-16	Win	(Thailand) Piyadej Lukthai	Lumpinee Stadium	Bangkok, Thailand	Decision	5	3:00
1979-04-03	Loss	(Japan) Toshio Fujiwara		Tokyo, Japan	TKO (Punches)	5	
1978-11-10	Win	(Thailand) Wangphrai Rojsongkhram	Lumpinee Stadium	Bangkok, Thailand	Referee stoppage	5	
1978-07-02	Win	(Thailand) Ruengrit Katathong	Rajadamnern Stadium	Bangkok, Thailand	Decision	5	3:00
1978-06-10	Loss	(Thailand) Rithikorn Phapamphitsilp		Lampang province, Thailand	Decision	5	3:00
1978-05-10	Loss	(Thailand) Kaopong Sitchuchai		Bangkok, Thailand	Decision	5	3:00
1978-03-29	Draw	(Thailand) Prawit Sritham	Rajadamnern Stadium	Bangkok, Thailand	Decision	5	3:00
1978-02-08	Win	(Thailand) Saengsakda Kittikasem	Rajadamnern Stadium	Bangkok, Thailand	Decision	5	3:00
1977-12-21	Loss	(Thailand) Chanchai Buraphamusik	Rajadamnern Stadium	Bangkok, Thailand	Decision	5	3:00
1977-09-19	Loss	(Thailand) Fahkaew Surakorsang	Rajadamnern Stadium	Bangkok, Thailand	Decision	5	3:00
1977-04-19	Win	(Thailand) Samersing Tianhiran	Rajadamnern Stadium	Bangkok, Thailand	Decision	5	3:00
1976-11-19	Loss	(Thailand) Bundit Singprakarn	Rajadamnern Stadium	Bangkok, Thailand	Decision	5	3:00
1976-08-26	Loss	(Thailand) Nongkhai Sor.Prapatsorn	Rajadamnern Stadium	Bangkok, Thailand	Decision	5	3:00
1976-06-16	Loss	(Thailand) Neth Saknarong	Rajadamnern Stadium	Bangkok, Thailand	Decision	5	3:00
1976-05-06	Win	(Thailand) Narongnoi Kiatbandit	Rajadamnern Stadium	Bangkok, Thailand	Decision	5	3:00
1976-03-31	Win	(Thailand) Narongnoi Kiatbandit	Rajadamnern Stadium	Bangkok, Thailand	Decision	5	3:00
1976-03-04	Loss	(Thailand) Wichannoi Porntawee	Rajadamnern Stadium	Bangkok, Thailand	Decision	5	3:00
1976-01-24	Win	(Thailand) Wangwon Lukmatulee		Chiang Mai, Thailand	Decision	5	3:00
1975-12-29	Loss	(Thailand) Narongnoi Kiatbandit	Rajadamnern Stadium	Bangkok, Thailand	Decision	5	3:00
1975-11-12	Loss	(Thailand) Pudpadnoi Worawut	Lumpinee Stadium	Bangkok, Thailand	Decision	5	3:00
1975-08-29	Loss	(Thailand) Bundit Singprakarn	Lumpinee Stadium	Bangkok, Thailand	Decision	5	3:00
1975-07-08	Win	(Thailand) Pudpadnoi Worawut	Lumpinee Stadium	Bangkok, Thailand	Decision	5	3:00
1975-05-14	Win	(Thailand) Jocky Sitkanpai	Samrong Stadium	Samut Prakan, Thailand	Decision	5	3:00
1975-02-27	Win	(Thailand) Samersing Tianhiran		Bangkok, Thailand	Decision	5	3:00
1975-01-31	Loss	(Thailand) Nongkhai Sor.Prapatsorn		Bangkok, Thailand	Decision	5	3:00
1975-01-06	Loss	(Thailand) Ruengsak Porntawee	Rajadamnern Stadium	Bangkok, Thailand	Decision	5	3:00
1974-11-22	Loss	(Thailand) Wichannoi Porntawee	Lumpinee Stadium	Bangkok, Thailand	Decision	5	3:00
1974-10-15	Loss	(Thailand) Wichit Lukbangplasoi	Lumpinee Stadium	Bangkok, Thailand	Decision	5	3:00
Loses the Lumpinee Stadium Super Featherweight (130 lbs) title.
1974-08-29	Win	(Thailand) Ruanpae Sitwatnang	Rajadamnern Stadium	Bangkok, Thailand	Decision	5	3:00
1974-07-26	Win	(Thailand) Pudpadnoi Worawut	Lumpinee Stadium	Bangkok, Thailand	Decision	5	3:00
Wins the Lumpinee Stadium Super Featherweight (130 lbs) title.
1974-06-	Win	(Thailand) Permsiri Rungrit	Rajadamnern Stadium	Bangkok, Thailand	Decision	5	3:00
1974-05-23	Loss	(Thailand) Wichannoi Porntawee	Rajadamnern Stadium	Bangkok, Thailand	Decision	5	3:00
1974-04-	NC	(Thailand) Faprakrob Singsamliam	Lumpinee Stadium	Bangkok, Thailand	Ref.stop (Faprakrob dismissed)	5	
1974-03-19	Win	(Thailand) Bundit Singprakarn	Lumpinee Stadium	Bangkok, Thailand	Decision	5	3:00
1974-02-	Win	(Thailand) Samersing Tianhiran	Rajadamnern Stadium	Bangkok, Thailand	Decision	5	3:00
1974-01-23	Win	(Thailand) Norasing Chalermchaiyi	Rajadamnern Stadium	Bangkok, Thailand	Decision	5	3:00
1973-11-28	Loss	(Thailand) Wannarong Peeramit	Rajadamnern Stadium	Bangkok, Thailand	Decision	5	3:00
1973-10-26	Win	(Thailand) Fahsai Thaweechai	Lumpinee Stadium	Bangkok, Thailand	Decision	5	3:00
1973-10-02	Win	(Thailand) Klairung Lukjaomaesaitong	Lumpinee Stadium	Bangkok, Thailand	Decision	5	3:00
1973-03-02	Win	(Thailand) Rittichai Lukkaewchao		Chiang Mai, Thailand	Decision	5	3:00
1973-02-14	Loss	(Thailand) Kittichon Sitpromsorn	Rajadamnern Stadium	Bangkok, Thailand	Decision	5	3:00
Legend: Win Loss Draw/No contest Notes

== See more ==
- List of Muay Thai practitioners
