= Wichannoi Porntawee =

Thai professional Muay Thai fighter (1948–2022)

- Wichannoi in 1976
- Born: Chucheep Iam-erb; January 25, 1948; Lat Lum Kaeo, Pathum Thani, Thailand
- Died: January 31, 2022 (aged 74); Paolo Hospital, Phaya Thai, Bangkok, Thailand
- Native name: ชูชีพ เอี่ยมเอิบ
- Other names: Wichannoi Luktalatkwan; Wichannoi Petchyindee; Wichannoi Srimuangnon (วิชาญน้อย ศรีเมืองนนท์)
- Nickname: The Eternal Top Boxer (ยอดมวยอมตะ); King Cobra That Protects His Eggs (จงอางหวงไข่); The Venomous Old Man (เฒ่าสารพัดพิษ); Gentleman of the Ring (สุภาพบุรุษสังเวียน); Top Boxer of Nonthaburi (ยอดมวยเมืองนนท์); Pi Cheep (ชีพ)
- Height: 170 cm (5 ft 7 in)
- Division: Flyweight; Super Flyweight; Bantamweight; Super Bantamweight; Featherweight; Super Featherweight; Lightweight
- Style: Muay Thai (Muay Mat)
- Stance: Orthodox
- Team: Srimuangnon (1960s); Porntawee (until 1980); Petchyindee (1980-1981)
- Trainer: Chaliew Tinmora (Srimuangnon Gym)
- Years active: c. 1961-1981

Other information
- Notable relatives: Cherdsak Srimuangnon; Direk Srimuangnon
- Notable students: Sagat Petchyindee; Chatchai Sasakul

Chucheep Iam-erb (Thai: ชูชีพ เอี่ยมเอิบ; January 25, 1948 – January 31, 2022), known professionally as Wichannoi Porntawee (Thai: วิชาญน้อย พรทวี) was a Thai professional Muay Thai fighter. After becoming a dominant figure in the 112 lbs to 130 lbs (50.80 - 58.97 kg) weight classes, he ran out of opponents and had to fight up to 20 lbs (9.07 kg) above his weight division to receive more matchups and was still successful. Wichannoi is remembered for being an fighting at the top competitive level of Muay Thai for an unusually long period of time, resulting in the nickname "The Eternal Yodmuay." He is repeatedly heralded by renowned Muay Thai practitioners as one of the greatest athletes in the history of the sport with the likes of Samart Payakaroon or Dieselnoi Chor.Thanasukarn.

There are different ways to anglicize Wichannoi's name such as Wichannoi Porntawee, Wichannoi Phonthawee, Vichannoi Phontawi, etc.

== Life and career ==
=== Early career ===
Chucheep Iam-erb was born on January 25, 1948 in Pathum Thani province, Thailand. After he and his family moved to Nonthaburi province, he started his Muay Thai training in 1961 under the tutelage of Chaliew Tinmora who was the owner of the Srimuangnon gym. Wichannoi's brothers Cherdsak and Direk were also fighting out of the camp. He then adopted the ring name of Wichannoi Luktalatkwan and fought in Muay Thai rules 10 times until he was considered a rising star and the gambler's favorite in Nonthaburi. After changing his ring name to Wichannoi Srimuangnon, he would travel throughout Thailand for several years to fight for various awards. During his travels, the Srimuangnon gym disbanded and Wichannoi would catch the attention of Boonyiam Sophon who was opening the Porntawee gym in Buriram province. Although the large Porntawee gym was populated mostly by top fighters from its local province, the first fighter to make the gym famous was the Nonthaburi-based Wichannoi who was also the gym's first fighter.

In his teenage years Wichannoi was considered the best up-and-coming fighter in the Thai circuit and would become famous under the tutelage of Sophon. With the help of assistant promoter Sei Lithavornchai AKA Kong Sei, Sophon would have the Porntawee fighters primarily get matchups in the Rajadamnern Stadium which was the most prestigious fighting venue during Wichannoi's rise to fame as the top Muay Thai promoters of Thailand focused their efforts there. The Porntawee fighters would also be frequently sent to the Lumpinee Stadium which would later become as prestigious as Rajadamnern.

=== Fighting style ===
Wichannoi was an unusual and technical orthodox Muay Maat fighter meaning that he was an intelligient pressure fighter who focused on punches as well as low kicks. He preferred to study his opponents by watching them live in fight venues. He had the movement and rhythm of rope-a-dope Muay Femur fighters on top of his aggressive fighting style, allowing him to be well-rounded and adaptable. He exercised active footwork as he pushed forward or moved backward, allowing him to be light on his feet like a boxer and easily throw punches as he quickly traversed in and out striking range. His footwork allowed him to quickly put power behind some of his punches such as in his KO win against the taller and heavier Huasai Sitiboonlert.

Wichannoi excelled at using fast, non-committal attacks such as lead low kicks and jabs to the head and body to control his opponent and manage distance like a Muay Femur fighter. Wichannoi would use a variation of the teep, a side-teep, thrown to the opponent's hip which he would use to cancel kicks from southpaw fighters, a tactic that would later be used by Samart Payakaroon. Wichannoi would use these controlling tactics in a seamless combination with his aggressive punches and strong low kicks. It is rare for a Muay Thai fighter to use long punching combinations, but Wichannoi excelled at it as well as using a wide array of punches to immediately counter his opponents. He used active footwork to control when pocket exchanges would occur as well as being able to pivot away from his opponents, a tactic that he would use to dodge Dieselnoi Chor.Thanasukarn's knees in their first fight. Wichannoi also used head movement to dodge punches alongside his angling footwork to create openings for body kicks or punches. Wichannoi's slightly crouched stance that allowed him to quickly move in and out was not conducive to being able to quickly raise a leg in order to block kicks, but willingly taking hits to get inside is something that Wichannoi embraced as a Muay Maat fighter.

=== Elite career in Bangkok ===
Wichannoi would take advantage of his adaptable and unique Muay Mat (puncher) style to become extremely successful from the flyweight (112 lbs/50.80 kg) to the junior lightweight (130 lbs/58.97 kg) divisions. He would win both the Lumpinee and Rajadamnern stadium flyweight titles and defended them both, becoming one of the few fighters who held titles in one weight class from both stadiums simultaneously. His manager Boonyiam Sophon worked to match him up against most of the top fighters at every weight division that he fought in, causing Wichannoi to become famous in Thailand. Wichannoi captured the Rajadamnern Stadium junior lightweight title against Saifah Saengmorakot and defended it five times over four years, resulting in the Thai media labeling him as Jonghang Huang Kai ("King Cobra Who Guards His Eggs") in reference to his belts.

Wichannoi was praised for his ability to remain successful in the highest competitive level of Muay Thai for an unusually long time as he would fight into his 30s, an age where most Thais would have already retired from the sport. As a result, the Thai media nicknamed him Tao Sarapatpit ("The Venomous Old Man"). In 1973, Wichannoi's dominance reached a point where he ran out of opponents in the junior lightweight division, thus he began giving up to 20 lbs/9.07 kg so he could be given a chance to receive matchups once again. He would defeat the 139-pound/63.05 kg Huasai Sithiboonlert (KO), the 150-pound/68.04 kg Somsak Sor.Thewasoonthon (KO), and the 135-pound/61.24 kg Wichit Lukbangplasoi among other heavier fighters. Wichannoi's level of fame at this time would cause the venues he fought at to reach full capacity, filled with spectators who came specifically for him.

In 1975, Wichannoi's fight against Poot Lorlek became the first in Muay Thai history to reach a gate of ฿1,000,000 (equivalent to ฿5,320,535 in 2020). Poot won the fight and it was named the Fight of the Year.

Circa 1977, Wichannoi was awarded 10 baht of gold (151.6 g of gold) by Rajadamnern Stadium for his performances. From 1976 to 1980, on top of his iconic rivalries against Nongkhai Sor.Prapatsorn and Narongnoi Kiatbandit, Wichannoi was matched a total of 6 times against the giants Posai Sitiboonlert and Dieselnoi Chor.Thanasukarn. His rivalries against the two were considered the greatest in his career and among the greatest of the decade, with Wichannoi winning 5 of his 6 bouts against them. Wichannoi was the first person to defeat Dieselnoi ever since Dieselnoi started fighting in Bangkok, as well as being the only fighter to have defeated him more than once.

Wichannoi is described in Thailand as one of the people who "fought everyone," a euphemism for being matched up against most of the best fighters in the weight classes he fought in during his career. The highest purse Wichannoi received was ฿250,000 (equivalent to ฿1,188,478 in 2020) which was significantly higher than the usual pay of elite fighters of the 1970s.

Wichannoi was the camp senior and trainer of notable fighters such as Sagat, Rerngsak, and Chatchai Sasakul (Nuengthoranee Petchyindee), Muay Thai champions who, like Wichannoi, were recognized as great punchers. Hippy Singmanee cited Sasakul to be the most skilled fighter he ever faced, stating that his movement made it difficult to catch him as he used evasive footwork tactics that most probably stemmed from Wichannoi's. Sagat recalls that when he was 10-years-old, Wichannoi scouted him in Nakhon Ratchasima province and took him to the Porntawee gym where he would become a Rajadamnern Bantamweight champion.

Boonyiam Sophon was an avid gambler and lavish spender. He would ask for loans from his friend "Sia Nao" Virat Vachirarattanawong, a Muay Thai aficionado and Lumpinee Stadium promoter. Sophon had spent 3-5 million baht for every election campaign he ran, and eventually went bankrupt. Because of this, instead of receiving cash as a form of debt payment, Vachirarattanawong asked Sophon for the Porntawee fighters to be transferred to Petchyindee Gym, a Muay Thai camp that he opened specifically to accommodate incoming Porntawee fighters. Rerngsak Porntawee was Petchyindee Gym's first fighter, with numerous others following suit. Wichannoi and Sagat Porntawee were the last fighters to make the transfer. Vachirarattanawong paid Sophon ฿550,000 (equivalent to ฿2,614,652 in 2020) to purchase Wichannoi in 1980. Wichannoi would then change his ring name to Wichannoi Petchyindee.

=== Retirement and later years ===
In the final year of this Muay Thai career, Wichannoi would lose 5 times in a row, with his last bout being against Kengkaj Kiatkriangkrai on August 14, 1980. Wichannoi was scheduled to return in 1981 but chose to retire when his training didn't go as well as he would have liked. He publicly announced his retirement from the sport in a formal ceremony at Rajadamnern Stadium on April 20, 1981, causing the venue to go silent.

After his retirement he became a real estate trader and successful businessman, becoming a millionaire, owning several-hundred-million baht businesses as well as making good investments. Wichannoi continued to involve himself with Muay Thai as a trainer at Petchyindee Gym for several years and sponsored fighters who would include "Wichannoi Store" in their ring names in reference to his textile store. He was also close to the community of his native province where he was involved in its municipal association.

Wichannoi's relation with Virat Vachirarattanawong grew to the point where they considered each other to be like brothers; he continued to follow Petchyindee Gym, citing that while Muay Thai was rapidly declining due to gambler-induced corruption and harmful rule changes, Vachirarattanawong's gym was still headed in the right direction.

One of Wichannoi's nicknames, Yodmuay Amata, translates to "The Eternal Yodmuay," in reference to his incredible longevity at the top level, fighting until he was 33 years old after over 10 years fighting top opposition, a level of longevity only surpassed by the likes of Chamuekpet Hapalang and Saenchai.

=== Death ===
Wichannoi's older brother Cherdsak Iam-erb disclosed that he had taken his last breath at 8:45 pm of January 31, 2022 in Paolo Hospital in Phaya Thai district, Bangkok. His death was caused by renal failure complications at the age of 74. His funeral ceremony held at the Bang Phraek Nuea Temple had numerous attendants including various yodmuay such as Samart Payakaroon and Samson Isaan as well as former rivals Dieselnoi Chor.Thanasukarn and Pudpadnoi Worawut.

== Titles and accomplishments ==
- Lumpinee Stadium
  - 1967 Lumpinee Stadium Flyweight (112 lbs) Champion
    - One successful defense
- Rajadamnern Stadium
  - 1968 Rajadamnern Stadium Flyweight (112 lbs) Champion
    - One successful defense
  - 1974 Rajadamnern Stadium Super Featherweight (130 lbs) Champion
    - Five successful defenses
- Awards
  - 1975 Fight of the Year (vs Poot Lorlek on June 19)
  - 1980 Fight of the Year (vs Dieselnoi Chor.Thanasukarn on January 22)
  - 2014 Siam Sport Hall of Fame (Muay Thai)
  - 1977 Yodmuaythai trophy (vs Narongnoi Kiatbandit on December 8)
  - 1978 Yodmuaythai trophy (vs Dieselnoi Chor.Thanasukarn on October 12)

== Muay Thai record ==
Muay Thai Record (incomplete)
| Date | Result | Opponent | Event | Location | Method | Round | Time |
|---|---|---|---|---|---|---|---|
| 1980-08-14 | Loss | (Thailand) Kengkaj Kiatkriangkrai | Rajadamnern Stadium | Bangkok, Thailand | Decision | 5 | 3:00 |
| 1980-07-14 | Loss | (Thailand) Nongkhai Sor.Prapatsorn | Rajadamnern Stadium | Bangkok, Thailand | Decision | 5 | 3:00 |
| 1980-05-03 | Loss | (Thailand) Kaopong Sitchuchai | | Klaeng, Thailand | TKO | 2 | |
| 1980-03-05 | Loss | (Thailand) Padejsuk Pitsanurachan | Rajadamnern Stadium | Bangkok, Thailand | Decision | 5 | 3:00 |
| 1980-01-22 | Loss | (Thailand) Dieselnoi Chor.Thanasukarn | Lumpinee Stadium | Bangkok, Thailand | Decision | 5 | 3:00 |
For the Yodmuaythai trophy.
| 1979-10-09 | Win | (Thailand) Paennoi Sakornphitak | Lumpinee Stadium | Bangkok, Thailand | Decision | 5 | 3:00 |
| 1979-07-02 | Win | (Thailand) Padejsuk Pitsanurachan | Rajadamnern Stadium | Bangkok, Thailand | Decision | 5 | 3:00 |
| 1979-05-11 | Loss | (Thailand) Khaosod Sitpraprom | Rajadamnern Stadium | Bangkok, Thailand | Decision | 5 | 3:00 |
| 1979-03-03 | Win | (Thailand) Posai Sittiboonlert | Lumpinee Stadium | Bangkok, Thailand | Decision | 5 | 3:00 |
| 1979-01-17 | Win | (Thailand) Dieselnoi Chor.Thanasukarn | Rajadamnern Stadium | Bangkok, Thailand | Decision | 5 | 3:00 |
| 1978-12-05 | Loss | (Thailand) Padejsuk Pitsanurachan | Rajadamnern Stadium | Bangkok, Thailand | Decision | 5 | 3:00 |
| 1978-10-12 | Win | (Thailand) Dieselnoi Chor.Thanasukarn | Rajadamnern Stadium | Bangkok, Thailand | Decision | 5 | 3:00 |
Receives the Yodmuaythai trophy.
| 1978-08-05 | Win | (Thailand) Narongnoi Kiatbandit | | Hat Yai, Thailand | Decision | 5 | 3:00 |
| 1978-06-02 | Loss | (Thailand) Narongnoi Kiatbandit | Wilfredo Gomez vs Sagat Porntawee | Nakhon Ratchasima, Thailand | Decision | 5 | 3:00 |
Loses the Rajadamnern Stadium Super Featherweight (130 lbs) title.
| 1978-05-04 | Win | (Thailand) Posai Sitiboonlert | Rajadamnern Stadium | Bangkok, Thailand | Decision | 5 | 3:00 |
| 1978-02-24 | Loss | (Thailand) Jitti Muangkhonkaen | Lumpinee Stadium | Bangkok, Thailand | Decision | 5 | 3:00 |
| 1977-12-08 | Win | (Thailand) Narongnoi Kiatbandit | Rajadamnern Stadium | Bangkok, Thailand | Decision | 5 | 3:00 |
Defends the Rajadamnern Stadium Super Featherweight (130 lbs) title and receives the Yodmuaythai trophy.
| 1977-10-27 | Loss | (Thailand) Nongkhai Sor.Prapatsorn | | Bangkok, Thailand | Decision | 5 | 3:00 |
| 1977-09-23 | Win | (Thailand) Wichit Lukbangplasoi | Lumpinee Stadium | Bangkok, Thailand | Decision | 5 | 3:00 |
| 1977-08-25 | Win | (Thailand) Neth Saknarong | | Bangkok, Thailand | Decision | 5 | 3:00 |
| 1977-06-02 | Loss | (Thailand) Narongnoi Kiatbandit | Rajadamnern Stadium | Bangkok, Thailand | Decision | 5 | 3:00 |
| 1977-04-28 | Win | (Thailand) Nongkhai Sor.Prapatsorn | Rajadamnern Stadium | Bangkok, Thailand | Decision | 5 | 3:00 |
Defends the Rajadamnern Stadium Super Featherweight (130 lbs) title.
| 1977-01-28 | Loss | (Thailand) Bundit Singprakarn | Rajadamnern Stadium | Bangkok, Thailand | Decision | 5 | 3:00 |
| 1976-12-15 | Win | (Thailand) Narongnoi Kiatbandit | Rajadamnern Stadium | Bangkok, Thailand | Decision | 5 | 3:00 |
Defends the Rajadamnern Stadium Super Featherweight (130 lbs) title.
| 1976-11-11 | Loss | (Thailand) Neth Saknarong | Rajadamnern Stadium | Bangkok, Thailand | Decision | 5 | 3:00 |
| 1976-09-27 | Loss | (Thailand) Jitti Muangkhonkaen | Rajadamnern Stadium | Bangkok, Thailand | Decision | 5 | 3:00 |
| 1976-08-18 | Win | (Thailand) Jocky Sitkanpai | Rajadamnern Stadium | Bangkok, Thailand | Decision | 5 | 3:00 |
| 1976-07-15 | Win | (Thailand) Posai Sitiboonlert | Rajadamnern Stadium | Bangkok, Thailand | Decision | 5 | 3:00 |
Defends the Rajadamnern Stadium Super Featherweight (130 lbs) title.
| 1976-05-27 | Loss | (Thailand) Pudpadnoi Worawut | Rajadamnern Stadium | Bangkok, Thailand | Decision | 5 | 3:00 |
| 1976-03-04 | Win | (Thailand) Khunponnoi Kiatsuriya | Rajadamnern Stadium | Bangkok, Thailand | Decision | 5 | 3:00 |
| 1976-02-12 | Win | (Thailand) Narongnoi Kiatbandit | Rajadamnern Stadium | Bangkok, Thailand | Decision | 5 | 3:00 |
Defends the Rajadamnern Stadium Super Featherweight (130 lbs) title.
| 1975-11-12 | Win | (Thailand) Neth Saknarong | Rajadamnern Stadium | Bangkok, Thailand | Decision | 5 | 3:00 |
| 1975-08-29 | Loss | (Thailand) Wichit Lukbangplasoi | Lumpinee Stadium | Bangkok, Thailand | Decision | 5 | 3:00 |
| 1975-07-25 | Loss | (Thailand) Bundit Singprakarn | Lumpinee Stadium | Bangkok, Thailand | Decision | 5 | 3:00 |
| 1975-06-19 | Loss | (Thailand) Poot Lorlek | Rajadamnern Stadium | Bangkok, Thailand | Decision | 5 | 3:00 |
| 1975-01-23 | Win | (Thailand) Bangmad Lukbangkoh | Rajadamnern Stadium | Bangkok, Thailand | Decision | 5 | 3:00 |
| 1974-11-22 | Win | (Thailand) Khunponnoi Kiatsuriya | Lumpinee Stadium | Bangkok, Thailand | Decision | 5 | 3:00 |
| 1974-08-22 | Loss | (Thailand) Saensak Muangsurin | Rajadamnern Stadium | Bangkok, Thailand | KO | 3 | |
| 1974-07-24 | Win | (Thailand) Wannarong Peeramit | | Bangkok, Thailand | Decision | 5 | 3:00 |
| 1974-05-23 | Win | (Thailand) Khunponnoi Kiatsuriya | Rajadamnern Stadium | Bangkok, Thailand | Decision | 5 | 3:00 |
| 1974-04-09 | Win | (Thailand) Somsak Sor.Thewasoonthon | Lumpinee Stadium | Bangkok, Thailand | KO | 2 | |
| 1974-03-01 | Loss | (Thailand) Pudpadnoi Worawut | Lumpinee Stadium | Bangkok, Thailand | Decision | 5 | 3:00 |
| 1974-01-21 | Win | (Thailand) Saifah Saengmorakot | Rajadamnern Stadium | Bangkok, Thailand | Decision (Split) | 5 | 3:00 |
Wins the vacant Rajadamnern Stadium Super Featherweight (130 lbs) title.
| 1973-11-22 | Win | (Thailand) Saifah Saengmorakot | Rajadamnern Stadium | Bangkok, Thailand | Decision | 5 | 3:00 |
| 1973-10-26 | Loss | (Thailand) Sirimongkol Luksiripat | Lumpinee Stadium | Bangkok, Thailand | Decision | 5 | 3:00 |
| 1973-09-07 | Loss | (Thailand) Khunpon Sakornphitak | Huamark Stadium | Bangkok, Thailand | Decision | 5 | 3:00 |
| 1973-07-25 | Loss | (Thailand) Khunpon Sakornphitak | Lumpinee Stadium | Bangkok, Thailand | Decision | 5 | 3:00 |
| 1973-06-22 | Win | (Thailand) Huasai Sittiboonlert | Lumpinee Stadium | Bangkok, Thailand | TKO (3 knockdowns, punches) | 2 | |
| 1973-05-17 | Win | (Thailand) Srichang Sakornpitak | Huamark Stadium | Bangkok, Thailand | KO | 4 | |
| 1973-04-03 | Loss | (Thailand) Huasai Sittiboonlert | Lumpinee Stadium | Bangkok, Thailand | Decision | 5 | 3:00 |
| 1973-02-09 | Win | (Thailand) Parnsak Kiatcharoenchai | Lumpinee Stadium | Bangkok, Thailand | Referee stoppage | 3 | |
| 1972-12-15 | Loss | (Thailand) Parnsak Kiatcharoenchai | Lumpinee Stadium | Bangkok, Thailand | Decision | 5 | 3:00 |
| 1972-11-06 | Win | (Thailand) Wisan Kraikriengyuk | Lumpinee Stadium | Bangkok, Thailand | KO | 4 | |
| 1972-09-29 | Win | (Thailand) Saensak Muangsurin | Huamark Stadium | Bangkok, Thailand | Decision | 5 | 3:00 |
| 1972-09-01 | Win | (Thailand) Buriram Suanmiskawan | Lumpinee Stadium | Bangkok, Thailand | Decision | 5 | 3:00 |
| 1972-08-01 | Loss | (Thailand) Saensak Muangsurin | Lumpinee Stadium | Bangkok, Thailand | Decision | 5 | 3:00 |
| 1972-06-09 | Win | (Thailand) Denthoranee Muangsurin | Lumpinee Stadium | Bangkok, Thailand | Decision | 5 | 3:00 |
| 1972-04-25 | Win | (Thailand) Poot Lorlek | Lumpinee Stadium | Bangkok, Thailand | Decision | 5 | 3:00 |
| 1972-03-01 | Loss | (Thailand) Muangchon Jeeraphan | | Bangkok, Thailand | Decision | 5 | 3:00 |
| 1972-01-31 | Loss | (Thailand) Sirimongkol Luksiripat | | Bangkok, Thailand | Decision | 5 | 3:00 |
| 1971-12-17 | Win | (Thailand) Pudpadnoi Worawut | Lumpinee Stadium | Bangkok, Thailand | KO | 3 | |
| 1971-11-05 | Win | (Thailand) Poot Lorlek | Lumpinee Stadium | Bangkok, Thailand | Decision | 5 | 3:00 |
| 1971-10-06 | Win | (Thailand) Chaiyut Sittiboonlert | Rajadamnern Stadium | Bangkok, Thailand | Decision | 5 | 3:00 |
| 1971-07-01 | Win | (Thailand) Chansuk Lukratchakru | Rajadamnern Stadium | Bangkok, Thailand | Decision | 5 | 3:00 |
| 1971-03-01 | Loss | (Thailand) Singhao Sor.Lukpitak | Rajadamnern Stadium | Bangkok, Thailand | Referee Stoppage | 5 | |
| 1971-01-27 | Win | (Thailand) Norasing Sida | Rajadamnern Stadium | Bangkok, Thailand | Decision | 5 | 3:00 |
| 1970-11-11 | Win | (Thailand) Rittisak Sornram | Rajadamnern Stadium | Bangkok, Thailand | Decision | 5 | 3:00 |
| 1970-09-01 | NC | (Thailand) Fahsai Taweechai | Lumpinee Stadium | Bangkok, Thailand | No Contest | 3 | |
Wichannoi was knocked out in the third round but stadium officials judged the result suspect and declared the fight a no contest.
| 1970-08-07 | Win | (Thailand) Taweechai Luadchon | Lumpinee Stadium | Bangkok, Thailand | Decision | 5 | 3:00 |
| 1970-06-19 | Win | (Thailand) Saifah Saengmorakot | Lumpinee Stadium | Bangkok, Thailand | TKO | 3 | |
| 1970-04-29 | Loss | (Thailand) Sirimongkol Luksiripat | Lumpinee Stadium | Bangkok, Thailand | Decision | 5 | 3:00 |
| 1970-04-06 | Win | (Thailand) Singhao Sor.Lukpitak | Charusathian Stadium | Bangkok, Thailand | Referee Stoppage | 5 | |
| 1970-03-09 | Win | (Thailand) Wehat Napapon | Rajadamnern Stadium | Bangkok, Thailand | Decision | 5 | 3:00 |
| 1970-02-17 | Win | (Thailand) Hongfah Ithianuchit | Lumpinee Stadium | Bangkok, Thailand | Decision | 5 | 3:00 |
| 1969-08-08 | Win | (Thailand) Norasing Isaraphap | Lumpinee Stadium | Bangkok, Thailand | Decision | 5 | 3:00 |
| 1969-07-04 | Win | (Thailand) Saifah Saengmorakot | Lumpinee Stadium | Bangkok, Thailand | Decision | 5 | 3:00 |
| 1969-04-08 | Win | (Thailand) Adulsak Ithianuchit | Lumpinee Stadium | Bangkok, Thailand | Decision | 5 | 3:00 |
| 1969-03-08 | Win | (Thailand) Plaidet Kaewsuriya | | Nonthaburi, Thailand | KO | 4 | |
| 1969-02-17 | Win | (Thailand) Jomkitti Singpaniang | Rajadamnern Stadium | Bangkok, Thailand | Decision | 5 | 3:00 |
Defends the Rajadamnern Stadium Flyweight (112 lbs) title.
| 1968-11-10 | Win | (Thailand) Chansak Sornsaksit | Charusathian Stadium | Bangkok, Thailand | Decision | 5 | 3:00 |
| 1968-09-18 | Win | (Thailand) Kiatpatum Dejpaisan | Rajadamnern Stadium | Bangkok, Thailand | Decision | 5 | 3:00 |
Wins the vacant Rajadamnern Stadium Flyweight (112 lbs) title.
| 1968-08-20 | Win | (Thailand) Yodchai Amornrat | Lumpinee Stadium | Bangkok, Thailand | Decision | 5 | 3:00 |
| 1968-06-08 | Loss | (Thailand) Chansak Sornsaksit | Rajadamnern Stadium | Bangkok, Thailand | Decision | 5 | 3:00 |
| 1968-05-06 | Loss | (Thailand) Ritthichai Lukkaojao | Rajadamnern Stadium | Bangkok, Thailand | Decision | 5 | 3:00 |
For the Rajadamnern Stadium Flyweight (112 lbs) title.
| 1968-04-05 | Draw | (Thailand) Samingthong Jeeraphan | Chanthanimit Shopping Center | Chanthaburi, Thailand | Decision | 5 | 3:00 |
Defends the Lumpinee Stadium Flyweight (112 lbs) title.
| 1968-01-29 | Win | (Thailand) Sanit Sor.Subin | | Chiang Mai, Thailand | KO | 2 | |
| 1967-12-08 | Loss | (Thailand) Samingthong Jeeraphan | Chartchai Chionoi vs Mimoun Ben Ali, Lumpinee Stadium | Bangkok, Thailand | Decision | 5 | 3:00 |
| 1967-10-31 | Win | (Thailand) Samingthong Jeeraphan | Lumpinee Stadium | Bangkok, Thailand | Decision | 5 | 3:00 |
Wins the Lumpinee Stadium Flyweight (112 lbs) title.
| 1967-03-28 | Loss | (Thailand) Saengthong Chakraphong | Lumpinee Stadium | Bangkok, Thailand | Decision | 5 | 3:00 |
| 1967-03-02 | Loss | (Thailand) Somsak Silthong | Rajadamnern Stadium | Bangkok, Thailand | TKO | 3 | |
Legend: Win Loss Draw/No contest Notes

== See more ==
- List of Muay Thai practitioners
