= Posai Sittiboonlert =

Thai former professional Muay Thai fighter

Posai Sitiboonlert
- Born: Prayong Makkong; February 12, 1956 (age 70); Takhli District, Nakhon Sawan province, Thailand
- Native name: ประยงค์ มากคง
- Other names: Posai Sor.Pichitchai
- Nickname: Mr. Telegraph Pole Knee (ขุนเข่าเสาโทรเลข)
- Height: 1.82 m (6 ft 0 in)
- Division: Super Featherweight
- Style: Muay Thai (Muay Khao)
- Stance: Orthodox
- Team: Sitiboonlert Gym

Prayong Makkong (Thai: ประยงค์ มากคง; born February 12, 1956), known professionally as Posai Sitiboonlert (Thai: โพธิ์ไทร สิทธิบุญเลิศ), is a Thai former professional Muay Thai fighter. He was the 1976 Fighter of the Year and was famous in the 1970s. Nicknamed "Mr. Telegraph Pole Knee", he was known for his devastating knees and is often regarded amongst the greatest Muay Thai fighters in history.

== Biography and career ==
Prayong Makkong started Muay Thai at the age of 13 at the Kor Srimongkon Gym where he took the name "Posai Saktuanchai". Posai trained for three years before he started competing and won his first 20 fights, fighting in the provinces of Lopburi, Nakhon Sawan and Chainat. Based on this success he was brought to the Sitiboonlert gym.

Posai reached his peak in the second half of the 1970s, being considered as an elite fighter from 1975 as he went undefeated during that year. The apex of his career being the year 1977 where his domination led to the organisation of handicap fights where he had to take on multiple fighters in one night without a break. The first time in Lumpinee Stadium against Jocky Sitkanpai and Jitti Muangkhonkaen who he defeated by decision. Later that year Posai faced three Japanese fighters in a row defeating all of them including one by knockout.
1977 is also the year he defeated muay thai legend Poot Lorlek and received the King's Fighter of the Year award for doing so. During his best years as a competitor Posai scored wins over other notable fighters such as Neth Saknarong, Wichit Lukbangplasoi, or Sagat Petchyindee.
The end of Posai's days as part of the stadium elite came in late 1979 when he suffered back to back losses, first by decision to the other ultra dominant knee fighter of the circuit Dieselnoi Chor Thanasukarn. His second and more devastating loss was inflicted by Padejsuk Pitsanurachan who knocked him out in the fourth round, marking the first loss by finish in five years for Posai. He would come back the next year and win two fights before being stopped by Youssop Sor.Thanikul in a bout where the referee asked him to leave the ring as he was not displaying any sort of fighting spirit. He retired following this loss. Posai is one of the most dominant Thai fighters to never win a stadium title.

== Titles and accomplishments ==
- 1976 Fighter of the Year

== Fight record ==
Muay Thai Record (incomplete)
Date	Result	Opponent	Event	Location	Method	Round	Time
1981-	Loss	(Thailand) Payap Premchai		Phrae province, Thailand			
1980-08-08	Loss	(Thailand) Yousop Sor.Thanikul		Bangkok, Thailand	Referee Stoppage	5	
1980-	Win	(Thailand) Seksan Sor.Theppitak		Bangkok, Thailand	Decision	5	3:00
1980-	Win	(Thailand) Khaosod Sitpraprom		Bangkok, Thailand	Decision	5	3:00
1979-12-07	Loss	(Thailand) Padejsuk Pitsanurachan	Lumpinee Stadium	Bangkok, Thailand	TKO (Punches)	4	
1979-10-09	Loss	(Thailand) Dieselnoi Chor Thanasukarn	Lumpinee Stadium	Bangkok, Thailand	Decision	5	3:00
1979-05-25	Win	(Thailand) Jitti Muangkhonkaen	Lumpinee Stadium	Bangkok, Thailand	Decision	5	3:00
1979-04-03	Win	(Thailand) Sagat Petchyindee		Bangkok, Thailand	Decision	5	3:00
1979-03-03	Loss	(Thailand) Wichannoi Porntawee	Lumpinee Stadium	Bangkok, Thailand	Decision	5	3:00
1978-12-05	Win	(Thailand) Phongdetnoi Prasopchai		Bangkok, Thailand	Decision	5	3:00
1978-11-06	Win	(Thailand) Neuasila Nor.Bangkod	Lumpinee Stadium	Bangkok, Thailand	Decision	5	3:00
1978-09-15	Win	(Thailand) Siprae Kiatsompop	Lumpinee Stadium	Bangkok, Thailand	Decision	5	3:00
1978-08-18	Win	(Netherlands) Ron Kuyt	Lumpinee Stadium	Bangkok, Thailand	KO (Knees)	2	
1978-08-02	Win	(United States) Benny Urquidez	Shin-Kakutojutsu	Tokyo, Japan	Decision	6	2:00
1978-05-04	Loss	(Thailand) Wichannoi Porntawee	Rajadamnern Stadium	Bangkok, Thailand	Decision	5	3:00
1978-02-24	Win	(Thailand) Siangnow Sitbangprachan	Lumpinee Stadium	Bangkok, Thailand	Decision	5	3:00
1978-01-27	Win	(Thailand) Wichit Lukbangplasoi	Lumpinee Stadium	Bangkok, Thailand	Decision	5	3:00
1977-11-05	NC	(Thailand) Poot Lorlek		Hat Yai, Thailand	Ref.stop. (Poot dismissed)	5	
1977-05-27	NC	(Thailand) Jitti Muangkhonkaen	Lumpinee Stadium	Bangkok, Thailand	Ref. stop (Posai dismissed)	4	
1977-04-08	Win	(Japan) "Futoshi" (Japan) "Asano" (Japan) "Kentosa"	3 vs 1 Lumpinee Stadium	Bangkok, Thailand	KO (Knee); KO; Decision	1; 1; 2	3:00
1977-03-11	Win	(Thailand) Poot Lorlek	Lumpinee Stadium	Bangkok, Thailand	Decision	5	3:00
Receives Yodmuaythai Trophy.
1977-02-04	Win	(Thailand) Jocky Sitkanpai (Thailand) Jitti Muangkhonkaen	2 vs 1 Lumpinee Stadium	Bangkok, Thailand	Decision	6	3:00
Handicap match. Jocky fought the first three rounds and Jitti the last three.
1976-11-03	Win	(Thailand) Jitti Muangkhonkaen	Lumpinee Stadium	Bangkok, Thailand	Decision	5	3:00
1976-10-05	Win	(Thailand) Neth Saknarong	Lumpinee Stadium	Bangkok, Thailand	Decision	5	3:00
1976-08-31	Draw	(Thailand) Neth Saknarong	Lumpinee Stadium	Bangkok, Thailand	Decision	5	3:00
1976-07-15	Loss	(Thailand) Wichannoi Porntawee	Rajadamnern Stadium	Bangkok, Thailand	Decision	5	3:00
For the Rajadamnern Stadium Super Featherweight (130 lbs) title.
1976-05-14	NC	(Thailand) Wichit Lukbangplasoi	Lumpinee Stadium	Bangkok, Thailand	Referee stop (dismissed)	5	
For the Lumpinee Stadium Super Featherweigjt (130 lbs) title. The referee asked Wichit to leave the ring judging that he wasn't fighting up to his capacities.
1976-03-02	Win	(Thailand) Chalermphon Sor Tha-it	Lumpinee Stadium	Bangkok, Thailand	Decision	5	3:00
1976-01-20	Loss	(Thailand) Neth Saknarong	Lumpinee Stadium	Bangkok, Thailand	Decision	5	3:00
1975-12-23	Win	(Thailand) Weerachat Sorndaeng	Lumpinee Stadium	Bangkok, Thailand	Decision	5	3:00
1975-10-14	Win	(Thailand) Siprae Duangprateep	Lumpinee Stadium	Bangkok, Thailand	KO	3	
1975-09-12	Win	(Thailand) Chartrung Rojanasongkram	Lumpinee Stadium	Bangkok, Thailand	Decision	5	3:00
1975-07-08	Win	(Thailand) Permsiri Rungrit	Lumpinee Stadium	Bangkok, Thailand	Decision	5	3:00
1975-06-06	Win	(Thailand) Saifah Saengmorakot	Lumpinee Stadium	Bangkok, Thailand	KO	2	
1975-05-09	Win	(Thailand) Kuekkong Chor. Suthichot	Lumpinee Stadium	Bangkok, Thailand	KO	1	
1975-03-25	Win	(Thailand) Kraipetch Sor. Prateep		Bangkok, Thailand	Decision	5	3:00
1975-02-14	Win	(Thailand) Somsak Sor.Thewasoonthorn	Lumpinee Stadium	Bangkok, Thailand	Referee stoppage	5	
1975-01-14	Win	(Thailand) Faprakrob Singsamliam	Lumpinee Stadium	Bangkok, Thailand	KO	3	
1974-12-19	Loss	(Thailand) Srinakorn Singbonkai	Lumpinee Stadium	Bangkok, Thailand	KO (Punches)	2	
1974-04-23	Win	(Thailand) Sommai Ekayothin	Lumpinee Stadium	Bangkok, Thailand	Decision	5	3:00
Legend: Win Loss Draw/No contest Notes

== See more ==
- List of Muay Thai practitioners
