= Perico Fernández =

Spanish boxer (1952–2016)

Personal information
- Nationality: Spanish
- Born: Pedro Fernández Castillejos; 19 October 1952 Zaragoza, Spain
- Died: 11 November 2016 (aged 64)
- Height: 1.69 m (5 ft 7 in)
- Weight: Lightweight; Light welterweight; Welterweight

Boxing career
- Stance: Orthodox

Boxing record
- Total fights: 127
- Wins: 82
- Win by KO: 47
- Losses: 28
- Draws: 15
- No contests: 2

Perico Fernández Castillejos (19 October 1952 – 11 November 2016) was a Spanish professional boxer who competed from 1972 to 1987. He held the WBC light welterweight title from 1974 to 1975.

== Professional career ==
Fernández turned pro in 1972 and captured the vacant WBC light welterweight title in 1974 with a split decision win over Lion Furuyama. He lost the belt the following year to Saensak Muangsurin from Thailand by TKO, with Muangsurin setting a world record by becoming world champion in only his 3rd fight. They fought a rematch in 1977 with Muangsurin winning a decision. Fernández retired in 1987.

== See also ==
- List of WBC world champions
- List of super lightweight boxing champions

Sporting positions
World boxing titles
Preceded by Bruno Arcari; Vacated	WBC Light Welterweight Champion; 21 September 1974 – 15 July 1975	Succeeded by Saensak Muangsurin
