= Toshio Fujiwara =

Japanese former kickboxer (born 1948)

- Born: Toshio Fujiwara; 3 March 1948 (age 78); Miyako, Iwate, Japan
- Native name: 藤原 敏男
- Nationality: (Japan) Japanese
- Height: 1.68 m (5 ft 6 in)
- Weight: 61 kg (134 lb; 9.6 st)
- Division: Lightweight
- Style: Kickboxing
- Stance: Orthodox
- Fighting out of: Mejiro, Toshima, Tokyo, Japan
- Team: Mejiro Gym
- Trainer: Kenji Kurosaki
- Years active: 1969–1983

Kickboxing record
- Total: 141
- Wins: 126
- By knockout: 99
- Losses: 13
- By knockout: 6
- Draws: 2
- No contests: 0

Other information
- Occupation: President of Toshio Fujiwara Sports Gym; President of Japan Martial Arts Directors
- Website: Toshio Fujiwara Sports Gym (in Japanese)
- Last updated on: March 21, 2010

Toshio Fujiwara (藤原 敏男 Fujiwara Toshio, born March 3, 1948) is a Japanese former kickboxer. Out of 141 professional fights before retiring at age 35, Fujiwara won 126, with a remarkable 99 by knockout; most notably, he was the first non-Thai to win a national Muay Thai title belt in Bangkok.

== Biography and career ==
Prior to his kickboxing career, Toshio Fujiwara was mainly engaged in table tennis and maintained great physical fitness. He had no martial arts background before starting Taikiken, a Yiquan derative founded by Kenichi Sawai.

A graduate from the Chuo University, he started training kickboxing at the Mejiro Gym in July 1969, learning under Kenji Kurosaki. He soon won the All Japan Kickboxing Federation championship, and did his first travels to Thailand in 1971.

In late April 1972, Fujiwara fought Rungnapa Sitsomsak. The even fight ended in a DQ win for Fujiwara, as Sitsomak's unsportsmanlike conduct got him disqualified in the third round.

In 1975, he had surgery to his left shin which left him hospitalised for six weeks. Three days after leaving hospital he ran at a long-distance event.

On March 18, 1978, Fujiwara fought Monsawan Ruk Changmai for the vacant Rajadamnern Championship. The fight ended in controversial fashion, as Fujiwara accidentally headbutted Monsawan unconscious, when both tumbled when locked in a clinch. Regardless, this fight allowed Fujiwara to be the first non-Thai to secure a Rajadamnern championship title win.

Fujiwara retired from fighting in 1983 with an impressive fight record. Subsequently, he founded his own gym, Toshio Fujiwara Sports Gym, which he runs presently in Tokyo. His most famous student in recent years is Satoshi Kobayashi, but many other well-known kickboxers and martial artists have also trained with him, including Masahiro Yamamoto, Satoru Sayama, Sanshu Tsubakichi and Takaaki Nakamura.

In 2010, he was appointed chairman of Japan Martial arts Directors (JMD), a commissioning group co-operating with the World Professional Muaythai Federation to oversee the development of the sport in Japan.

== Fight record ==
Kickboxing record
126 wins (99 KOs), 13 losses, 2 draws
Date	Result	Opponent	Event	Location	Method	Round	Time
1983-02-05	Win	(Japan) Hideo Adachi		Tokyo, Japan	KO (punches)	3	
1983-01-07	Win	(Japan) Dan Masabatsu		Tokyo, Japan	KO	4	
1982-11-20	Win	(Japan) Tsubasa Goro		Tokyo, Japan	KO	3	
1982-07-25	Win	(Japan) Younger Funaki		Tokyo, Japan	KO	5	
1982-01-07	Win	(United States) Manny Johnston		Tokyo, Japan	TKO (towel thrown)	4	1:52
Defends Shin-Kakutojutsu World Lightweight championship title.
1981-12-	Win	(Japan) Keiichi Sei		Tokyo, Japan	KO	3	
1981-06-	Win	(Japan) Kou Saotome		Tokyo, Japan	KO	1	
1981-05-	Loss	(Japan) Keiji Saito		Tokyo, Japan	TKO	2	
1980-09-29	Win	(Thailand) Kripet Pratep			Decision	5	3:00
1980-08-28	Win	(Thailand) Sinsak Sosripan			KO	2	
1980-02-27	Win	(Thailand) Chan Chiarun			Decision	5	3:00
1980-01-28	Loss	(Thailand) Santi Rekchai			Decision	5	3:00
1980-01-03	Win	(Japan) Kunimasa Nagae			KO	2	
1979-12-	Win	(Thailand) Saksaron Saknarong		Tokyo, Japan	Decision	5	3:00
1979-08-	Loss	(Thailand) Weerachat Sordaeng		Tokyo, Japan	TKO	2	
1979-06-	Win	(Thailand) Santi Rekchai		Tokyo, Japan	Decision	5	3:00
1979-04-03	Win	(Thailand) Khunponnoi Haphalang		Tokyo, Japan	TKO (punches)	5	
1979-02-12	Loss	(Thailand) Narongnoi Kiatbandit	Rajadamnern Stadium	Bangkok, Thailand	Decision	5	3:00
For a 2 million baht side-bet.
1979-02-06	Win	(Thailand) Prayuth Sittiboonlert		Tokyo, Japan	Decision	5	3:00
1978-12-23	Win	(Thailand) Sinsak Sosripan			Decision	5	3:00
1978-11-25	Win	(Thailand) Pirapon Chosaman			KO	3	
1978-10-30	Win	(Thailand) Siprae Kiatsompop		Tokyo, Japan	KO (right hook)	7	
Winning Shin-Kakutojutsu World Lightweight championship title.
1978-10-10	Win	(Thailand) Pirapon Chosaman			KO	2	
1978-09-15	Win	(Thailand) Pudpadnoi Worawut	Lumpinee Stadium	Bangkok, Thailand	Decision	5	3:00
1978-08-26	Win	(Thailand) Pirapon Chosaman		Tokyo, Japan	KO	4	
1978-08-02	Win	(United States) Refugio Flores		Tokyo, Japan	KO	5	
1978-06-07	Loss	(Thailand) Siprae Kiatsompop	Rajadamnern Stadium	Bangkok, Thailand	Decision (unanimous)	5	3:00
Lost Rajadamnern Stadium Lightweight title.
1978-05-27	Win	(Thailand) Wongchai Chorsawan			KO	1	
1978-03-18	Win	(Thailand) Mongsawan Lukchangmai		Tokyo, Japan	KO	4	
Wins the Rajadamnern Stadium Lightweight (135 lbs) title. Fujiwara became the first non-Thai to be a major Stadium champion.
1977-11-14	Win	(Thailand) Wannarong Piramit	AJKA	Tokyo, Japan	Decision (unanimous)	5	3:00
1977-09-17	Win	(Thailand) Sorpongsak Sohoyo	AJKA	Tokyo, Japan	KO (uppercut)	2	1:08
1977-07-24	Win	(Thailand) Chawarin Kiatchangklrai			KO	2	
1977-04-07	Win	(Thailand) Chalermpon Sor Tha-It	Rajadamnern Stadium	Bangkok, Thailand	Decision	5	3:00
Wins Thailand Boxing Council World Lightweight title. Becomes the first foreigner to win a Muay Thai World title in Thailand.
1977-03-05	Win	(Japan) Katsuyuki Suzuki	AJKA	Tokyo, Japan	KO	5	0:44
Retains AJKA title (6). After this bout, Fujiwara returned his title.
1976-12-4	Win	(Thailand) Tsuchai Iserapap			KO	3	
1976-10-30	Win	(Thailand) Rawee Wiwerchai	Rajadamnern Stadium	Bangkok, Thailand	KO	1	
1976-09-	Win	(Thailand) Tsuchai Iserapap			KO	1	
1976-08-21	Loss	(Thailand) Rawee Wiwerchai	AJKA	Tokyo, Japan	TKO (middle kicks)	1	0:55
1976-07-	Win	(Thailand) Gamonfa Sitesai			KO	2	
1976-07-09	Win	(Japan) Ryo Tsuchiya	AJKA	Tokyo, Japan	KO (uppercut)	5	0:44
Retains AJKA title (5).
1976-06-	Win	(Thailand) Chobu Rai			KO	2	
1976-05-	Win	(Thailand) Rung Sinyasonpon			KO	3	
1976-05-	Win	(Thailand) Gamonfa Sitesai			KO	1	
1976-04-	Win	(Thailand) Rantae Weerapon	AJKA	Tokyo, Japan	TKO	2	
1976-03-08	Loss	(Thailand) Sirimongkol Luksiripat	Rajadamnern Stadium	Bangkok, Thailand	Decision	5	3:00
1976-01-27	Win	(Thailand) Bakrynu Maropitak			KO	4	
1976-01-1	Win	(Thailand) Rung Sinyasonpon			Decision	5	3:00
1975-12-	Win	(Thailand) Ri Sapoton			KO	3	
1975-11-	Win	(Thailand) Chachain Lukbangko			KO	2	
1975-10-	Win	(Thailand) Pesito Simoosan			KO	3	
1975-05-31	Win	(Japan) Masanobu Sato	AJKA	Tokyo, Japan	Decision	5	3:00
Retains AJKA title (4).
1975-05-	Win	(Thailand) Chamoon Pontawee			KO	3	
1975-04-	Win	(Thailand) Banchin Sibaton			KO	3	
1975-03-8	Win	(Thailand) Chamoon Pontawee		Bangkok, Thailand	KO	4	
1974-11-26	Loss	(Thailand) Jaidee Pisanurachan		Tokyo, Japan	Decision (unanimous)	5	3:00
for the BBTV Lightweight title.
1974-10-29	Win	(Thailand) Jaidee Pisanurachan		Tokyo, Japan	Decision	5	3:00
1974-09-	Win	(Thailand) Asawin Charonchai			Decision	5	3:00
1974-09-	Win	(Thailand) Fason Sosampakon			KO	3	
1974-08-	Win	(Thailand) Taksin Chanarit			KO	2	
1974-07-26	Win	(Japan) Shozo Nakamura	AJKA	Tokyo, Japan	KO (uppercut)	5	1:24
1974-06-12	Draw	(Thailand) Muangchon Jeeraphan	Rajadamnern Stadium	Bangkok, Thailand	Decision	5	3:00
1974-05-	Win	(Thailand) Saenchin Petchatanun		Tokyo, Japan	KO	3	
1974-04-	Win	(Thailand) Radjo Isarapap			KO	2	
1974-03-	Win	(Thailand) Bangyai Isarapap			Decision	5	3:00
1974-01-	Win	(Japan) Kyoshi Masuzawa			KO	1	
1974-01-	Win	(Thailand) Potoron Soponwat			Decision	5	3:00
1973-12-	Win	(Japan) Goro Arashi	AJKA	Tokyo, Japan	Decision	5	3:00
Retains AJKA title (3).
1973-11-	Win	(Thailand) Sakuda Iserapa			KO	4	
1973-11-	Win	(Thailand) Asawin Sidowata			Decision	5	3:00
1973-10-	Loss	(Thailand) Ronchai Wancharasak			TKO (referee stoppage)	2	
1973-07-	Win	(Thailand) Komchak Sida			Decision	5	3:00
1973-06-30	Win	(Thailand) Richidet Sangmorakot	All Japan Kickboxing	Tokyo, Japan	KO	2	
1973-06-06	Win	(Japan) Masanori Sawano	AJKA	Tokyo, Japan	Decision	5	3:00
Retains AJKA title (2).
1973-04-	Win	(Thailand) Meksuran Iserapa			KO	4	
1973-04-	Win	(Thailand) Samsei Iserapa			KO	1	
1973-03-29	Win	(Japan) Shozo Saijo	All Japan Kickboxing	Tokyo, Japan	TKO (corner stoppage)	3	3:00
1973-03-01	Win	(Thailand) Monkran Srisothorn			Decision	5	3:00
1973-02-	Win	(Japan) Shinji Tomaru			KO	2	
1973-01-22	Win	(Thailand) Pripechee Rukprajanban			KO	3	
1973-01-15	Win	(Thailand) Tarnin Saksery			KO	4	
1973-01-	Win	(Thailand) Senpet Tunaronglit			KO	1	
1972-11-30	Draw	(Japan) Minoru Shanzyo		Tokyo, Japan	Decision	5	3:00
1972-11-22	Win	(Thailand) Samande Itechai		Bangkok, Thailand	KO	3	
1972-10-	Win	(Thailand) Bindio Apansak			KO		
1972-10-	Win	(Thailand) Atisak Uik			KO		
1972-08-12	Loss	(Thailand) Saenchai Srisompop	Kittikachorn Stadium	Bangkok, Thailand	TKO (doctor stoppage/cut)	4	
1972-07-	Win	(Thailand) Srasak Wapuyak			KO		
1972-07-	Win	(Thailand) Werasak Sodek			Decision	5	3:00
1972-06-21	Win	(Japan) Yoshimitsu Tamashiro	AJKA	Tokyo, Japan	Decision	5	3:00
Retains AJKA title (1).
1972-05-21	Win	(Thailand) Tanwa Novinyam			KO		
1972-04-30	Win	(Thailand) Rungnapa Sitsomsak		Bangkok, Thailand	DQ	4	
1972-03-	Win	(Thailand) Tosak Timrand			KO	3	
1972-02-	Win	(Thailand) Sitchai Amonrad			KO	1	
1972-01-	Win	(Thailand) Honton Swwonmisbwon			KO	2	
1972-01-	Win	(Japan) Itenushi Marako			KO	1	
1971-11-	Win	(Thailand) Saksui Suihara			KO	3	
1971-11-05	Win	(Japan) Yoshimitsu Tamashiro	AJKA	Tokyo, Japan	Decision	5	3:00
Win the tournament for the inaugural All Japan Kickboxing Association Lightweight title.
1971-10-	Win	(Thailand) Potep Repara			KO	1	
1971-09-	Win	(Thailand) Krasuk Rukhayer			KO	3	
1971-08-	Win	(Thailand) Isorayuk Chaimrand			KO	4	
1971-08-	Win	(Thailand) Yorkursuk Sakchari			KO	3	
1971-07-	Win	(Japan) Shina Takashi			KO	1	
1971-06-	Win	(Thailand) Buton Sikmu			KO	2	
1971-05-	Win	(Thailand) Fadem Rukbamkra			KO	4	
1971-05-	Win	(Thailand) Buton Sikmu			KO	5	
1971-04-	Loss	(Thailand) Srasak Wayupak			TKO (referee stoppage)	2	
1971-04-	Win	(Thailand) Viradarek Rukranton			KO	3	
1971-03-	Win	(Thailand) Pichron Rudson			KO	2	
1971-03-	Win	(Thailand) Sirisak Rukgansiri			KO	4	
1971-02-	Win	(Thailand) Pripan Beosryan			KO	2	
1971-02-	Win	(Thailand) Pirapon Lumeini			KO	1	
1971-01-	Win	(Thailand) Viradack Lukrontan			KO	2	
1970-12-25	Win	(Thailand) Sonkran Lukpanchaman			Decision	5	3:00
1970-11-28	Win	(Thailand) Pichan Sicharo			KO	1	
1970-11-11	Win	(Thailand) Kwanjaluk Satahip			KO	2	
1970-10-31	Win	(Japan) Kazuo Nimoto			KO	3	
1970-10-17	Win	(Thailand) Tchaomang Sopiboon			KO	1	
1970-09-26	Win	(Thailand) Goming Sicharo			KO	2	
1970-09-05	Win	(Thailand) Tachasing Sicharo			KO	4	
1970-08-17	Win	(Japan) Mitsuo Nakano			KO	3	
1970-08-07	Win	(Thailand) Tyali Saktyali			KO	2	
1970-07-27	Win	(Thailand) Yasesak Srimon			Decision	5	3:00
1970-07-10	Win	(Thailand) Sorasak Jeuaron			KO	1	
1970-06-22	Win	(Thailand) Krachai Honsurai			KO	2	
1970-05-30	Win	(Thailand) Muanyak Kachapichit			KO	2	
1970-05-09	Win	(Thailand) Bandal Ruskrepat			KO	2	
1970-04-13	Win	(Thailand) Tcharomchai Kartesuk			KO	1	
1970-04-04	Win	(Thailand) Chainor Jadoparson			KO	2	
1970-03-20	Win	(Japan) Mitsuo Nakano		Japan	Decision	5	3:00
1970-02-27	Win	(Thailand) Surin Udomsak			KO	4	
1970-02-07	Win	(Thailand) Honkaew Suranmisakawan			Decision	5	3:00
1970-01-21	Win	(Thailand) Chainor Jadoparson		Japan	KO	4	
1970-01-06	Win	(Japan) Phoenix Yamaguchi		Japan	Decision	5	3:00
1969-12-19	Win	(Japan) Eiji Sakamoto		Japan	Decision	5	3:00
1969-11-	Loss	(Thailand) Sakuchai Rakanton			Decision	5	3:00
1969-10-	Loss	(Thailand) Nampon Kartesuk			Decision	5	3:00
1969-10-01	Win	(Japan) Takao Sakai		Japan	KO	2	
Legend: Win Loss Draw/no contest Notes

== See also ==
- List of male kickboxers
