= Pudpadnoi Worawut =

Thai former professional Muay Thai fighter

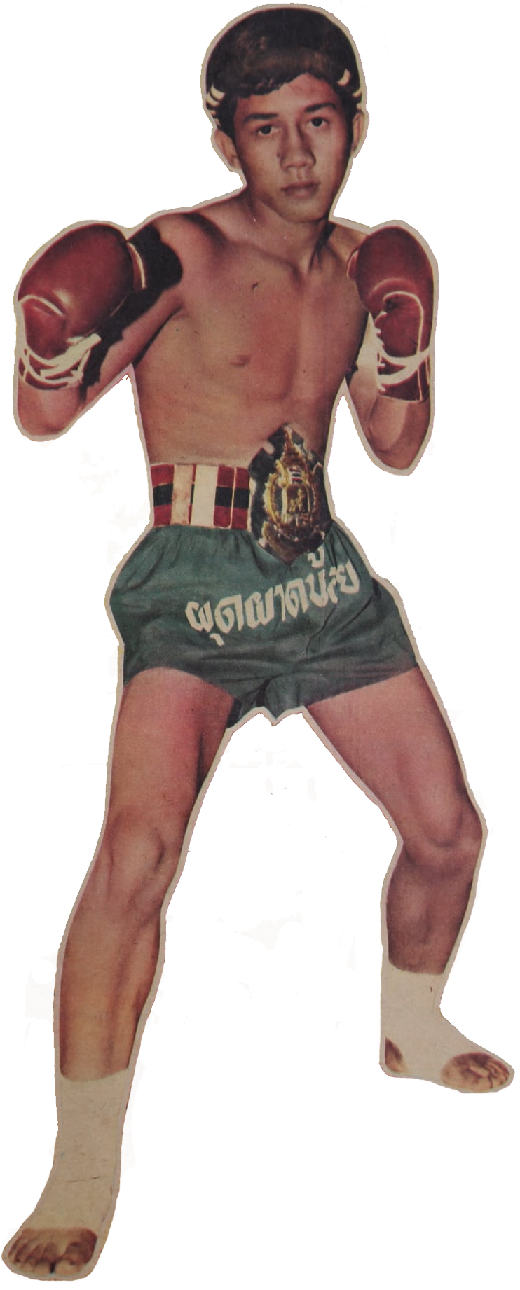
- Pudpadnoi in 1971
- Born: Ponn Ommklin; June 25, 1951 (age 75); Khon Kaen, Thailand
- Native name: ผ่อน ออมกลิ่น
- Nickname: The Golden Leg (หมูแข้งทอง); Pi Moo
- Height: 172 cm (5 ft 8 in)
- Division: Light Flyweight; Flyweight; Super Bantamweight; Super Featherweight
- Style: Muay Thai (Muay Femur)
- Stance: Southpaw
- Team: Worawut Gym
- Years active: c. 1965-1979

Kickboxing record
- Total: 150
- Wins: 135
- Losses: 15

Other information
- Occupation: Muay Thai trainer

Ponn Ommklin (Thai: ผ่อน ออมกลิ่น; born June 25, 1951), known professionally as Pudpadnoi Worawut (Thai: ผุดผาดน้อย วรวุฒิ) is a Thai former professional Muay Thai fighter. He is a former three-division Lumpinee Stadium champion, as well as the 1975 Fighter of the Year, who was famous in the 1970s. Nicknamed "The Golden Leg", he is often regarded as one of the greatest fighters in the history of Muay Thai.

== Biography and career ==
Ponn Ommklin started Muay Thai at the age of 14 in his native province of Khon Kaen, following the steps of his older brother. His parents wouldn't let him pursue Muay Thai full time before graduating high school which he did in 1969. During that period Pudpanoi competed in Isan over 60 times and went undefeated. At the age of 18 he went to Bangkok on the advice of a fighter from the Worawut camp. On this occasion Pudpadnoi used his famous ring name for the first time as he won his debut in Rajadamnern Stadium by high kick knockout. During his first two years of competition in Bangkok Pudpadnoi won 17 of 19 fights. He was a very versatile southpaw with powerful kicks earning him the nickname "The Golden Leg".

Pudpadnoi was one of the most dominant fighter in Muay Thai between 1970 and 1976, winning three Lumpinee Stadium titles. He holds victories over some of the most notable fighters of his era such as Fahsai Taweechai, Bundit Singprakarn, Vicharnnoi Porntawee, Huasai Sitiboonlert, Narongnoi Kiatbandit, Neth Saknarong, Wichit Lukbangplasoi, Sirimongkol Luksiripat and Apidej Sit-Hirun.

Pudpadnoi's domination was such that at the peak of his career he was matched with opponents outweighing him by more than 10 lbs. His purses went as high as 120,000 baht. Pudpadnoi retired for the first time in 1976 when he went to live in Los Angeles, following the death of his father he returned to Thailand and made a comeback in the stadiums but with little success and retired again in 1979.

In 1980 Pudapdanoi went to live in France as a trainer, he owned a gym in Paris. His most famous French student was Guillaume Kerner. In 2003 Pupadnoi went to teach in Sweden and later in the Philippines before coming back to Thailand where he still teaches and occasionally works as a referee.

== Titles and accomplishments ==
- Lumpinee Stadium
  - 1971 Lumpinee Stadium Flyweight (112 lbs) Champion
  - 1971 Lumpinee Stadium Super Bantamweight (122 lbs) Champion
  - 1973 Lumpinee Stadium Super Featherweight (130 lbs) Champion
- Rajadamnern Stadium
  - 1969 Rajadamnern Stadium 108 lbs Tournament Winner

Awards

- 1975 King's Fighter of the Year
- 1975 Prime Minister Award
- 1984 Rajadamnern Stadium Hall of Fame
- 2026 Rajadamnern Stadium Hall of Fame
- 2014 Siam Kela Hall of Fame (Muay Thai)

== Muay Thai record ==
Muay Thai Record (incomplete)
135 Wins, 15 Losses
Date	Result	Opponent	Event	Location	Method	Round	Time
1994-	Win	(France)		Réunion	KO (High kick)	2	
1979-08-31	Loss	(Thailand) Payap Premchai		Bangkok, Thailand	Decision	5	3:00
1979-03-03	Loss	(Thailand) Kaopong Sitichuchai	Lumpinee Stadium	Bangkok, Thailand	Decision	5	3:00
1979-01-09	Win	(Thailand) Phuchong Saksanguanchom	Lumpinee Stadium	Bangkok, Thailand	Decision	5	3:00
1978-11-10	Loss	(Thailand) Nongkhai Sor.Prapatsorn	Lumpinee Stadium	Bangkok, Thailand	Decision	5	3:00
1978-09-15	Loss	(Japan) Toshio Fujiwara	Lumpinee Stadium	Bangkok, Thailand	Decision	5	3:00
1978-08-15	Win	(Thailand) Wangprai Rojanasongkram	Lumpinee Stadium	Bangkok, Thailand	Decision	5	3:00
1976-08-31	Loss	(Thailand) Wangwon Lukmatulee	Lumpinee Stadium	Bangkok, Thailand	Decision	5	3:00
1976-07-08	Loss	(Thailand) Jocky Sitkanpai	Lumpinee Stadium	Bangkok, Thailand	Decision	5	3:00
1976-04-06	Draw	(Thailand) Jocky Sitkanpai	Lumpinee Stadium	Bangkok, Thailand	Decision	5	3:00
1976-05-27	Win	(Thailand) Wichannoi Porntawee	Rajadamnern Stadium	Bangkok, Thailand	Decision	5	3:00
1976-02-26	Loss	(Thailand) Neth Saknarong	Rajadamnern Stadium	Bangkok, Thailand	Decision	5	3:00
1976-01-30	Win	(Thailand) Wichit Lukbangplasoi	Huamark Stadium	Bangkok, Thailand	Decision	5	3:00
1975-12-23	Win	(Thailand) Sirimongkol Luksiripat	Lumpinee Stadium	Bangkok, Thailand	Decision	5	3:00
1975-11-12	Win	(Thailand) Khunponnoi Kiatsuriya	Lumpinee Stadium	Bangkok, Thailand	Decision	5	3:00
1975-10-14	Win	(Thailand) Apidej Sit-Hirun	Lumpinee Stadium	Bangkok, Thailand	Decision	5	3:00
1975-09-12	Win	(Thailand) Neth Saknarong	Lumpinee Stadium	Bangkok, Thailand	Decision	5	3:00
1975-08-14	Win	(Thailand) Narongnoi Kiatbandit	Lumpinee Stadium	Bangkok, Thailand	Decision	5	3:00
1975-07-08	Loss	(Thailand) Khunponnoi Kiatsuriya	Lumpinee Stadium	Bangkok, Thailand	Decision	5	3:00
1975-06-06	Win	(Thailand) Chalermphon Sor.Tha-it	Lumpinee Stadium	Bangkok, Thailand	Decision	5	3:00
1975-05-02	Win	(Thailand) Ruengsak Porntawee	Lumpinee Stadium	Bangkok, Thailand	Decision	5	3:00
1974-10-08	Win	(Thailand) Somsak Sor.Thewasoonthorn	Lumpinee Stadium	Bangkok, Thailand	Decision	5	3:00
1974-08-22	Win	(Thailand) Bundit Singprakarn	Lumpinee Stadium	Bangkok, Thailand	Decision	5	3:00
1974-07-26	Loss	(Thailand) Khunponnoi Kiatsuriya	Lumpinee Stadium	Bangkok, Thailand	Decision	5	3:00
Loses the Lumpinee Stadium Super Featherweight (130 lbs) title.
1974-06-18	Win	(Thailand) Yodsing Por.Payathai		Bangkok, Thailand	Decision	5	3:00
1974-04-05	Win	(Thailand) Huasai Sitiboonlert	Lumpinee Stadium	Bangkok, Thailand	KO (Elbow)	4	
1974-03-01	Win	(Thailand) Wichannoi Porntawee	Lumpinee Stadium	Bangkok, Thailand	Decision	5	3:00
1974-02-01	Win	(Thailand) Pansak Kiatjaroenchai	Lumpinee Stadium	Bangkok, Thailand	Decision	5	3:00
1973-12-14	Win	(Thailand) Somsak Sor.Thewasoonthorn		Bangkok, Thailand	Decision	5	3:00
1973-10-02	Win	(Thailand) Yodsing Por.Payathai		Bangkok, Thailand	Decision	5	3:00
Handicap fight, Yodsing weighed in 12 lbs higher than Pudpadnoi. Wins 120,000 baht side-bet.
1973-09-12	Win	(Thailand) Muangchon Jeeraphan	Rajadamnern Stadium	Bangkok, Thailand	Decision	5	3:00
1973-07-31	Loss	(Thailand) Yodsing Por.Payathai	Lumpinee Stadium	Bangkok, Thailand	Decision	5	3:00
Handicap fight, Yodsing weighed in 10 lbs higher than Pudpadnoi.
1973-06-22	Win	(Thailand) Chaiyut Sitiboonlert	Lumpinee Stadium	Bangkok, Thailand	Decision	5	3:00
Wins the vacant Lumpinee Stadium Super Featherweight (130 lbs) title.
1973-05-11	NC	(Thailand) Burengnong Singsornthong	Lumpinee Stadium	Bangkok, Thailand	Burengnong dismissed	5	
For the vacant Lumpinee Stadium Super Featherweight (130 lbs) title.
1973-04-03	Win	(Thailand) Sorasak Sor.Bukhalo		Bangkok, Thailand	Decision	5	3:00
1973-01-23	Win	(Thailand) Bundit Singprakarn	Lumpinee Stadium	Bangkok, Thailand	KO (High kick)	3	
1972-12-04	Win	(Thailand) Nanna Muangsurin	Huamark Stadium	Bangkok, Thailand	KO	4	
1972-09-29	Win	(Thailand) Taweechai Luedchon	Huamark Stadium	Bangkok, Thailand	Decision	5	3:00
1972-09-01	Win	(Thailand) Denthoranee Muangsurin		Bangkok, Thailand	Decision	5	3:00
1972-07-21	Win	(Thailand) Saifah Saengmorakot	Lumpinee Stadium	Bangkok, Thailand	Decision	5	3:00
1972-06-27	Win	(Thailand) Fahsai Taweechai	Lumpinee Stadium	Bangkok, Thailand	Decision	5	3:00
1972-05-30	Win	(Thailand) Thepnarong Kiatsuriya		Bangkok, Thailand	Decision	5	3:00
1972-05-05	Win	(Thailand) Dejsakda Sornram		Bangkok, Thailand	KO	3	
1972-04-13	Loss	(Thailand) Nanna Muangsurin		Chonburi, Thailand	KO	3	
1972-03-14	Win	(Thailand) Norasing Seeda		Bangkok, Thailand	Decision	5	3:00
1971-12-17	Loss	(Thailand) Wichannoi Porntawee	Lumpinee Stadium	Bangkok, Thailand	KO	3	
1971-11-05	Win	(Thailand) Suksawad Srithewet	Lumpinee Stadium	Bangkok, Thailand	Decision	5	3:00
Wins the vacant Lumpinee Stadium Super Bantamweight (122 lbs) title.
1971-08-14	Win	(Thailand) Songkramchai Kiat Chor.Por	Lumpinee Stadium	Bangkok, Thailand	Decision	5	3:00
1971-08-06	Win	(Thailand) Chandet Weerapol	Lumpinee Stadium	Bangkok, Thailand	KO (High kick)	4	
1971-07-09	Win	(Thailand) Noknoi Singthanongsak	Lumpinee Stadium	Bangkok, Thailand	Decision	5	3:00
1971-06-04	Win	(Thailand) Kwanmuang Chitprasert		Bangkok, Thailand	Decision	5	3:00
1971-04-30	Loss	(Thailand) Samaod Singsornthong		Bangkok, Thailand	Decision	5	3:00
1971-04-02	Win	(Thailand) Rojsaming Lukprakanong	Huamark Stadium	Bangkok, Thailand	KO	2	
1971-01-29	Win	(Thailand) Kiatpatum Phanphang-nga	Lumpinee Stadium	Bangkok, Thailand	Decision	5	3:00
Wins the vacant Lumpinee Stadium Flyweight (112 lbs) title.
1970-12-01	Win	(Thailand) Phalachai Sakwarin	Lumpinee Stadium	Bangkok, Thailand	Decision	5	3:00
1970-11-13	Draw	(Thailand) Fightta Theparat		Khon Kaen, Thailand	Decision	5	3:00
1970-10-12	Win	(Thailand) Daengnoi Singnongpho	Rajadamnern Stadium	Bangkok, Thailand	Decision	5	3:00
1970-09-02	Win	(Thailand) Ritthichai Lukkajao	Rajadamnern Stadium	Bangkok, Thailand	Decision	5	3:00
1970-08-12	Win	(Thailand) Songkramchai Kiat Chor.Por		Khon Kaen, Thailand	Decision	5	3:00
1970-07-26	Win	(Thailand) Denchai Thailok	Rajadamnern Stadium	Bangkok, Thailand	Decision	5	3:00
1970-06-22	Loss	(Thailand) Kwanmuang Chitprasert	Rajadamnern Stadium	Bangkok, Thailand	Decision	5	3:00
1970-05-20	Win	(Thailand) Kraisorn Singkongka	Rajadamnern Stadium	Bangkok, Thailand	Decision	5	3:00
1970-03-04	Win	(Thailand) Sang Suthising		Ban Prong, Thailand	Decision	5	3:00
1969-11-17	Win	(Thailand) Chamongdet Songsiam		Thailand	Decision	5	3:00
1969-10-30	Win	(Thailand) Kongsil Thiamkhamhaeng		Khon Kaen, Thailand	KO	1	
1969-10-02	Win	(Thailand) Klairong Lookchaomaesaitong	Rajadamnern Stadium	Bangkok, Thailand	Decision	5	3:00
1969-09-11	Win	(Thailand) Somyot		Thailand	Decision	5	3:00
1969-08-13	Win	(Thailand) Khakta Jathamon	Rajadamnern Stadium	Bangkok, Thailand	Decision	5	3:00
1969-07-30	Win	(Thailand) Truphet Muangsurin	Rajadamnern Stadium	Bangkok, Thailand	KO	2	
1969-07-02	Win	(Thailand) Tuanchai Saprasong	Rajadamnern Stadium	Bangkok, Thailand	Decision	5	3:00
1969-	Win	(Thailand) Saifon Sakdsawan		Khon Kaen, Thailand	KO	2	
1969-05-01	Win	(Thailand) Singthon Singbatan	Rajadamnern Stadium	Bangkok, Thailand	KO (High kick)	2	
Legend: Win Loss Draw/No contest Notes

== See more ==
- List of Muay Thai practitioners
