= Zehra Doğan (kickboxer) =

Turkish Muay Thai Kickboxer (born 2001)

- Born: Zeliha Doğan; 30 May 2001 (age 25); Osmaniye, Turkey
- Other names: Zehra Venum Muay Thai; Devil Girl
- Nationality: Turkish
- Height: 170 cm (5 ft 7 in)
- Weight: 51 kg (112 lb; 8 st 0 lb)
- Division: Atomweight; Flyweight
- Style: Kickboxing; Muay Thai
- Fighting out of: Turkey
- Team: Venum Training Camp
- Trainer: Mehdi Zatout
- Years active: 2010-present

Kickboxing record
- Total: 28
- Wins: 23
- By knockout: 5
- Losses: 5

Other information
- Occupation: Athlete
- University: Akdeniz University (Physical education department)
- Notable relatives: Zeliha Doğan (Sister); Sevgi Doğan (Sister)

Zehra Doğan (born 30 May 2001), aşso known as Zeliha Doğan, is a Turkish Muay Thai, Kickboxer. She is IFMA and WAKO former world champion and the current WBC Muaythai world and Muay Ying flyweight champion. Doğan ranked #4 in the WMO flyweight rankings.

== Early life ==
Doğan started sports at a young age under the supervision of her father, who is a retired taekwondo practitioner, and with her two other sisters Zeliha and Sevgi. When she saw the success of her sister, she became more interested in professional sports and after 2 years of starting martial arts, she won world championship medal.

== Profession ==
Doğan serves as a teacher in the rank of a Lieutenant in the Turkish Land Forces.

== Sports career ==
=== IFMA ===
In 2014 and 2017, Doğan was able to win the gold and bronze medal of the IFMA Youth World Muay Thai Championship. In 2016, she also won the Gold Medal of the IFMA European Muay Thai Championship.

=== WAKO ===
Between the years 2019 and 2021, Doğan was able to win the gold medals of the European, International, World and World Cup of WAKO Kickboxing championships.

=== RWS ===
Doğan participated in the first Rajadamnern World Series (RWS) league as one of 4 foreign women fighters along with 4 Thai fighters. This was the first time after 70 years since the foundation of Rajadamnern stadium that female fighters made history and entered the ring of this stadium. On December 23, 2022, She lost to Somratsamee Chaisuya by split decision in the final.

=== WBC Muay Thai ===
On February 5, 2023, Doğan defend Gabrielel Batista by split decision and win the WBC Muay Thai world and Muay Ying title. She is the first and only Turkish fighter who owns this title.

=== ONE Championship ===
On August 15, 2023, Doğan made her ONE Championship debut at ONE Friday Fights 33, where she loss Junior Fairtex by TKO.

== Titles and accomplishments ==
=== Amateur ===
- International Federation of Muaythai Associations
  - (gold) 2014 IFMA 45 kg World Youth Championship
  - (gold) 2016 IFMA 54 kg Europe Youth Championship
  - (bronze) 2017 IFMA 54 kg World Youth Championship
- World Association of Kickboxing Organizations
  - (gold) 2019 WAKO 52 kg INTERNATIONAL TURKISH OPEN KICKBOXING WORLD CUP
  - (gold) 2019 WAKO 52 kg Europe Juniors Championship
  - (gold) 2020 WAKO 48 kg INTERNATIONAL TURKISH OPEN KICKBOXING WORLD CUP
  - (gold) 2021 WAKO 48 kg INTERNATIONAL TURKISH OPEN KICKBOXING WORLD CUP
  - (gold) 2021 WAKO 48 kg World Championship
  - (gold) 2022 WAKO 52 kg World Cup
  - (gold) 2024 WAKO 52 kg European Championship

=== Professional ===
- World Boxing Council Muaythai
  - 2023 WBC Muay Thai -50.802 kg World Championship
  - 2023 WBC Muay Thai -50.802 kg Muay Ying Championship

== Fight record ==
Professional Muay Thai record
23 Wins (5 (T)KO's), 6 Losses, 0 Draw
Date	Result	Opponent	Event	Location	Method	Round	Time
2023-11-24	Loss	(Hong Kong) Yu Yau Pui	ONE Friday Fights 42, Lumpinee Stadium	Bangkok, Thailand	TKO (Body punches)	2	1:28
2023-09-15	Loss	(Thailand) Junior Fairtex	ONE Friday Fights 33, Lumpinee Stadium	Bangkok, Thailand	TKO (right straight to the body)	2	2:36
2023-05-27	Loss	(Australia) Joanne La	Rebellion Muay Thai XXVII	Melbourne, Australia	Decision (split)	3	3:00
2023-02-05	Win	(Brazil) Gabriele Batista	Amazing Muay Thai Festival	Hua Hin, Thailand	Decision (split)	5	2:00
Won the WBC Muaythai Flyweight World and Muay Ying titles.
2022-12-23	Loss	(Thailand) Somratsamee Manopgym	Rajadamnern World Series - Final	Bangkok, Thailand	Decision (split)	5	2:00
For the 2022 Rajadamnern World Series 112 lbs title.
2022-11-25	Win	(Thailand) Aida Looksaikongdin	Rajadamnern World Series - Semi final	Bangkok, Thailand	Decision (unanimous)	3	2:00
2022-10-21	Loss	(Thailand) Somratsamee Manopgym	Rajadamnern World Series	Bangkok, Thailand	Decision (unanimous)	3	2:00
2022-09-16	Win	(Spain) Desiree Rovira	Rajadamnern World Series	Bangkok, Thailand	KO (right hook)	1	0:28
2022-08-12	Win	(Thailand) Petchnamnueng Fairtex	Rajadamnern World Series	Bangkok, Thailand	Decision (unanimous)	3	2:00
2022-07-02	Loss	(Iran) Fateme Yavari	Karabag Zafer Gecesi	Baku, Azerbaijan	Decision (unanimous)	3	3:00
2022-03-15	Win	(Greece) Karmen Tsavdiridi	Ringin Sultanlari	Istanbul, Turkey	Decision (unanimous)	3	3:00
2017-10-30	Win	(Turkey) Seher Inci	Republic Cup	Mersin, Turkey	KO (high kick)	1	1:00
2016-02-02	Win	(Turkey) N/A	Arena of Legends Muay Thai	Istanbul, Turkey	KO (high kick)	1	
Legend: Win Loss Draw/No contest Notes

Amateur Muaythai record
290 wins, (70 (T)KO's), 10 Losses, 0 draws
Date	Result	Opponent	Event	Location	Method	Round	Time
2021-10-22	Win	(Russia) Doktugu Diana	2021 WAKO World Championships - Final	Jesolo, Italy	KO (high kick)	1	
Wins WAKO World Championships Gold Medal.
2021-10-22	Win	(Brazil) Maria Eduardo	2021 WAKO World Championships - Semi final	Jesolo, Italy	Decision (3–0)	3	3:00
2021-10-22	Win	(Serbia) Mihajlovic Milana	2021 WAKO World Championships - Quarter final	Jesolo, Italy	Decision (3–0)	3	3:00
2019-08-31	Win	(Russia) Kristina Malikova	2019 WAKO Juniors European Championships - Final	Győr, Hungry	Decision (3–0)	3	3:00
Wins WAKO Juniors European Championships Gold Medal.
2019-08-31	Win	(Russia) Daria Zhiltsova	2019 WAKO Juniors European Championships - Semi final	Győr, Hungry	Decision (3–0)	3	3:00
2018-08-06	Win	(Thailand) Wraphon Jaiteang	2018 IFMA Youth World Muay Thai Championships	Bangkok, Thailand	Decision (2–1)	3	3:00
2017-08-14	Win	(New Zealand) Mykayla Robert	2017 IFMA Youth World Muay Thai Championships - Semi final	Bangkok, Thailand	KO (knee)	1	
2017-08-12	Win	(Australia) Sani Nurminen	2017 IFMA Youth World Muay Thai Championships - Quarter final	Bangkok, Thailand	Decision (3–0)	3	3:00
2014-05-09	Win	(Australia) Hannah Bradicich	2014 IFMA Youth World Muay Thai Championships - Final	Langkawi, Malaysia	Decision (3–0)	3	3:00
Wins IFMA Youth World Championships Gold Medal.
Legend: Win Loss Draw/No contest Notes

== See also ==
- List of WBC Muaythai female world champions
- List of female kickboxers
- List of Muay Thai practitioners
- Venum
