= Hrun =

Hrun is the name of:

- Apidej Sit Hrun
- Hrun the Barbarian
