= List of Muay Thai practitioners =

This is a list of notable Muay Thai practitioners (also known as nak muay).

== Thai ==
=== Current ===
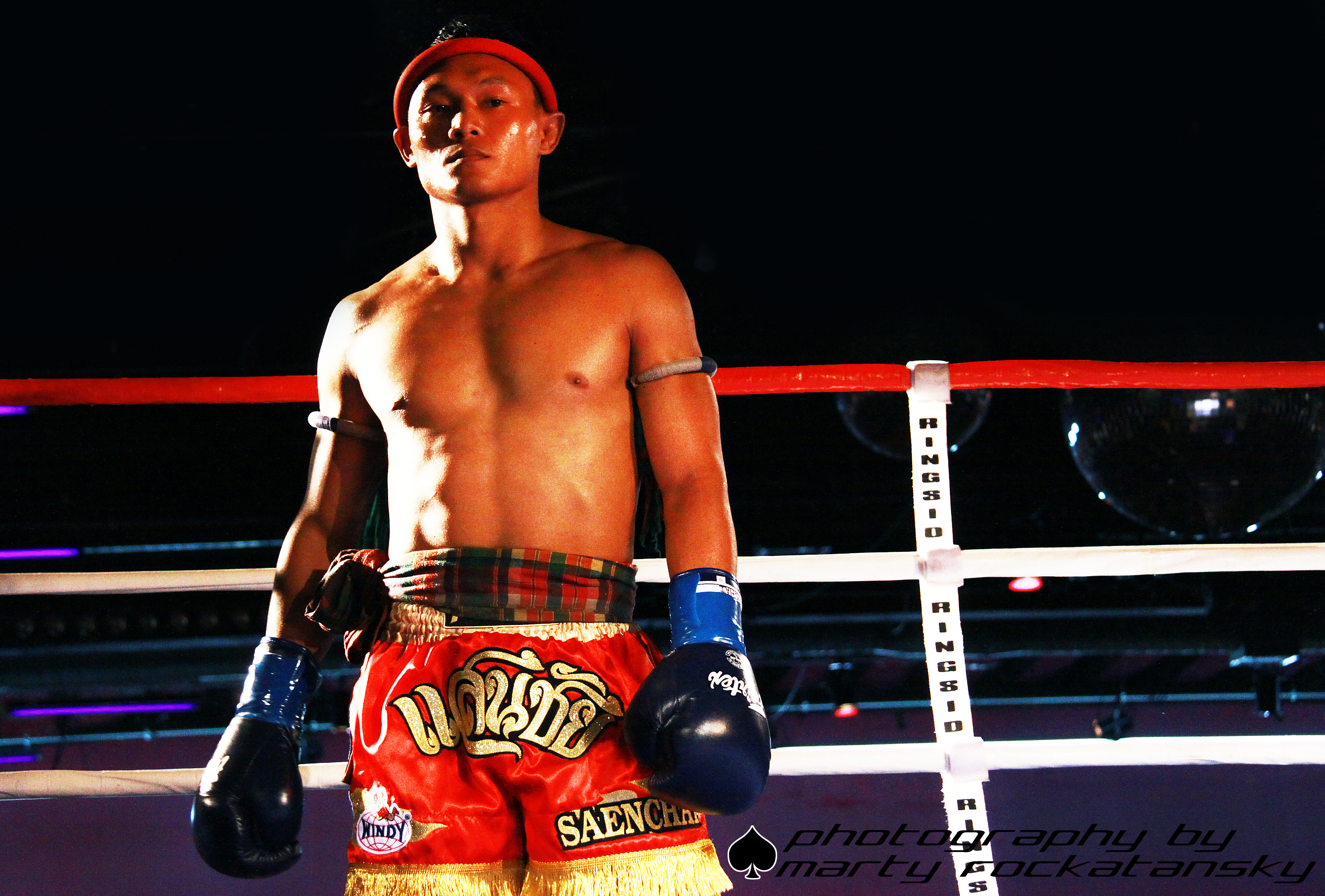
Saenchai

- Saenchai – won the Lumpinee Stadium title in four weight divisions while mostly fighting larger opponents. He has only been knocked out once in his entire fighting career. He is considered by many to be the best pound for pound Muay Thai fighter, and is regarded as one of the best fighters of all time. He is also a professional boxer and was PABA Featherweight interim champion.
- Nong-O Gaiyanghadao – former ONE Bantamweight Muay Thai World Champion with four title defenses; was Lumpinee Stadium champion in four weight divisions
- Rodtang Jitmuangnon – ONE Flyweight Muay Thai World Champion with three title defenses; known for his iron chin
- Sam-A Gaiyanghadao – ONE Champion in both Muay Thai and Kickboxing; was Lumpinee Stadium champion in two weight divisions
- Phetmorakot Petchyindee Academy – ONE Featherweight Muay Thai World Champion; was Lumpinee Stadium champion in two weight divisions
- Somratsamee Manopgym – the first woman to ever win a Rajadamnern Stadium title

=== Former ===
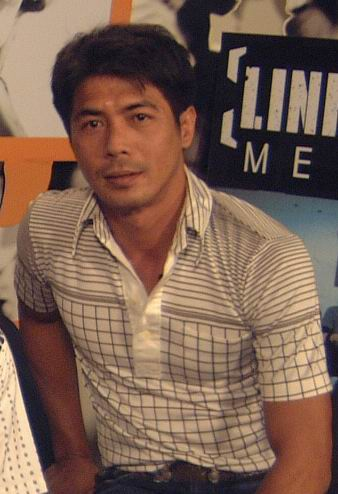
Samart Payakaroon

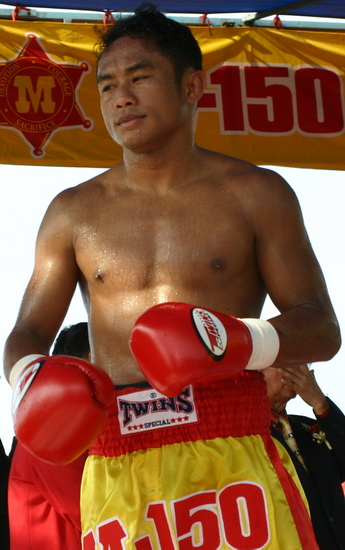
Veeraphol Sahaprom

- Samart Payakaroon – considered by many to be the greatest Muay Thai fighter of all time, becoming Lumpinee Stadium champion in four different weight divisions from 1980 to 1981, as well as a WBC world champion in boxing at the super bantamweight class in 1986. He is the younger brother of Kongtoranee Payakaroon.
- Veeraphol Sahaprom – Three-division Rajadamnern Stadium champion as well as WBC and WBA Bantamweight Champion in boxing with 14 title defenses. Highly regarded in both Muay Thai and Western-style boxing.
- Dieselnoi Chor Thanasukarn – was Lumpinee Stadium champion in the lightweight division. In 1982, he defeated Samart Payakaroon via decision. During his four-year reign as champion he was undefeated and was forced to retire as there was nobody in the weight division left to contest his position. He is considered to be the Greatest Muay Khao (knee fighter) of all time.
- Vicharnnoi Porntawee – was champion in both the Lumpinee and Rajadamnern stadiums. Faced many strong opponents and holds two victories over Dieselnoi Chor Thanasukarn.
- Pudpadnoi Worawut – nicknamed 'The Golden Leg', was one of the most dominant fighters of the 1970s where he won three Lumpinee Stadium titles at three different weight classes.
- Apidej Sit-Hirun – was a Lumpinee Stadium champion. He is considered the hardest kicker in Muay Thai history. He was crowned "Fighter of the Century" by Bhumibol Adulyadej, King of Thailand and was the first nak muay to be given his own display at the Thai National Museum.
- Kongtoranee Payakaroon – older brother of Samart Payakaroon who won the Lumpinee Stadium title in five different weight divisions. He also had a professional boxing career in the Super flyweight division where his record was 12–2 and he fought twice for a title. The first time he fought Gilberto Román for the WBC Super flyweight title and the second time he fought against fellow Thai Boxer, Khaosai Galaxy for the WBA Super flyweight title.
- Chamuekpet Hapalang – won the Lumpinee Stadium title in four different weight divisions; southpaw stance; best known for his powerful and precise knee strikes for which he is nicknamed "Computer Knee Striker"; also competed as a professional boxer where he was PABA champion at 126 lbs
- Thongchai Tor.Silachai – won the Lumpinee Stadium title in four different weight divisions; in 1996, he became the only person to have knocked out Saenchai in a professional bout.
- Namsaknoi Yudthagarngamtorn – won the Lumpinee Stadium title in three different weight divisions; had one of the longest reigns as champion where he was undefeated in the 135 lbs division 2000–2006; holds one of the highest winning percentages (95% wins in 300 fights).
- Namkabuan Nongkeepahuyuth – was Lumpinee Stadium champion in the Junior lightweight division; held the belt for six consecutive years.
- Sagat Petchyindee – three time Lumpinee Stadium champion; also a professional boxer with a record of 12–2 and fought Wilfredo Gómez in 1978 for the WBC super bantamweight title; considered to be the inspiration for the character Sagat in the Street Fighter video game series
- Kaensak Sor.Ploenjit – was Lumpinee Stadium champion in the flyweight division; fought in the late 80s to early 90s that was considered the golden era of Muay Thai where he faced many strong opponents; Muay Thai Fighter of the Year in 1989–1990; one of the most popular fighters of his generation.

=== Non-Thai ===
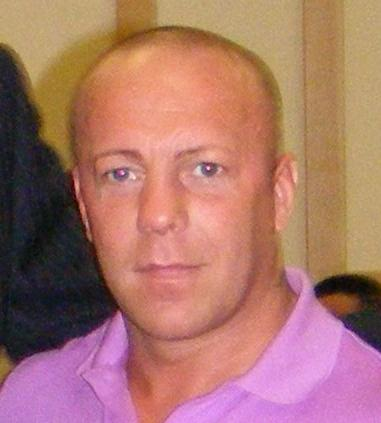
Ramon Dekkers

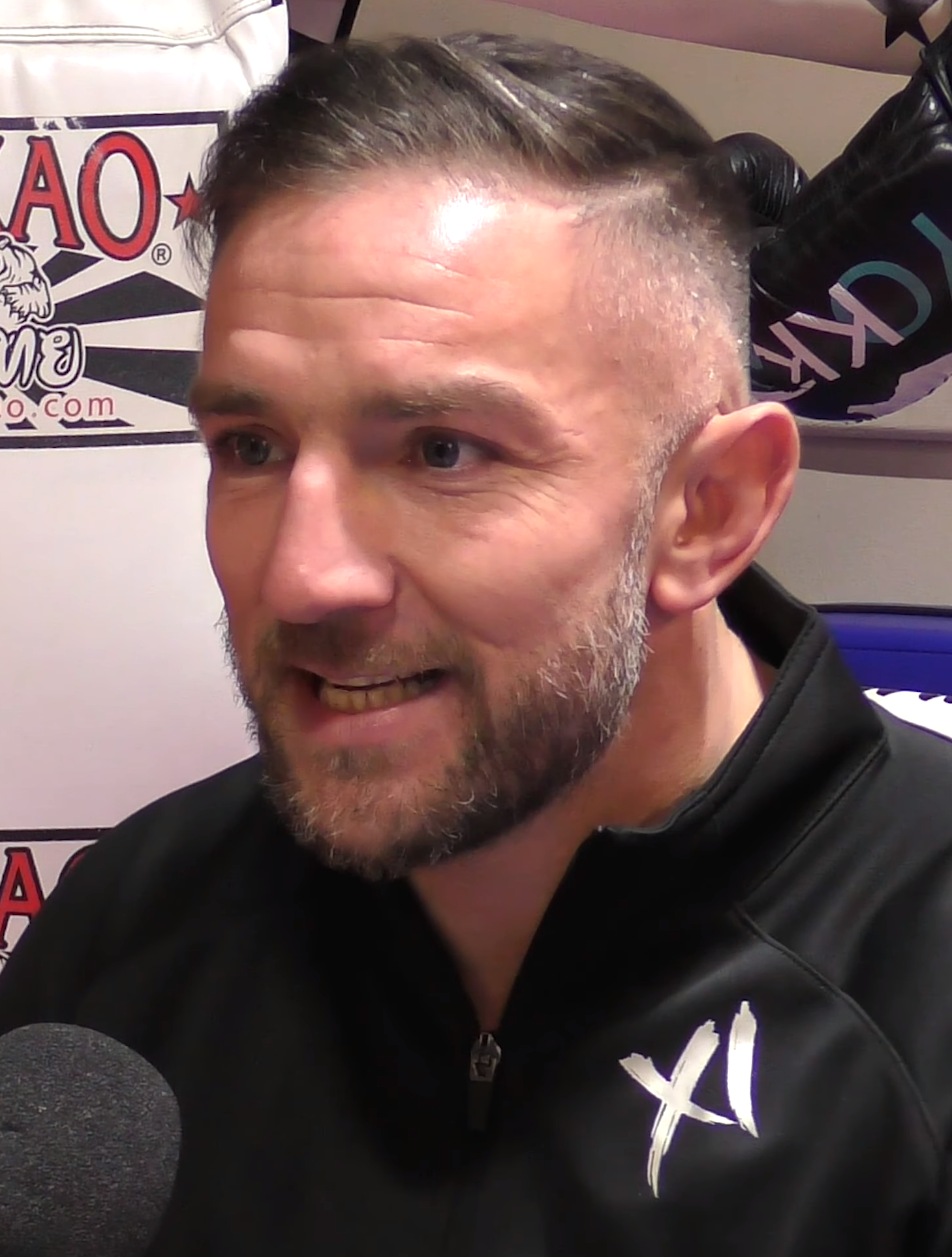
Liam Harrison

- Ramon Dekkers – Dutch fighter who won multiple world titles and challenged for the Lumpinee Stadium Lightweight title in 1990. He is considered by many Thai legends to be the greatest foreign fighter in history.
- Dany Bill – Cameroonian fighter who was the IMF World champion at Welterweight from 1993 to 1999.
- Toshio Fujiwara – Japanese fighter who was the second non-Thai fighter to win a Bangkok stadium title when he became the Rajadamnern Stadium Lightweight Champion in 1978.
- Morad Sari – French-Algerian fighter who was the first non-Thai fighter to become a Lumpinee Stadium champion when he won a title at Lightweight in 1999.
- Jean-Charles Skarbowsky – French fighter who defeated multiple Bangkok champions. At Rajadamnern Stadium, he earned the ranking of #1 at both Super Lightweight and Middleweight but was never given the opportunity to fight for a title.
- Damien Alamos – French fighter who was the Lumpinee Stadium Super Lightweight Champion from 2012 to 2013 with two defenses. He was the first non-Thai fighter to defend a Lumpinee title.
- John Wayne Parr – Australian kickboxer who has won multiple world titles in Muay Thai; 2001 Australian Boxing Middleweight Champion
- Nadaka Yoshinari – Japanese fighter who is a one-time Lumpinee Stadium and three-time Rajadamnern Stadium champion across three divisions. He is the current Rajadamnern Stadium Bantamweight Champion since 2024.
- Rafi Bohic – French fighter who was a two-time Lumpinee Stadium Welterweight Champion from 2017 to 2019 with four defenses.
- Liam Harrison – English fighter who has held multiple world titles.
- Youssef Boughanem – Moroccan-Belgian fighter who was champion at Rajadamnern Stadium in 2016 and Lumpinee Stadium in 2018 at Middleweight. He is the first non-Thai to become a champion in both major Bangkok stadiums.
- Dani Rodriguez – Swiss fighter who is the current Rajadamnern Stadium Super Welterweight Champion since 2022.
- Genji Umeno - Japanese fighter who was the Rajadamnern Stadium Lightweight Champion from 2016 to 2017.
- Jonathan Haggerty – English fighter who was the ONE Championship champion at Flyweight (135 lbs) in 2019 and Bantamweight (145 lbs) from 2023 to 2024.
- Jimmy Vienot – French fighter who was the Lumpinee Stadium Middleweight Champion in 2019.
- Andrei Kulebin – Belarusian fighter who won multiple world titles in both the amateur and professional levels.
- Sajad Sattari – Iranian fighter who was the Rajadamnern Stadium Welterweight Champion in 2023.
- Nathan Corbett – Australian Muay Thai fighter who has won multiple world titles.
- Andy Howson – Uk Muay Thai fighter WBC, Wako, ISka, WMC world champion
- Dida Diafat – Algerian-French Muay Thai fighter who has won world title in Las Vegas versus Ramon Dekkers.
- Alexey Ignashov – Belarus former kickboxer and multiple Muay Thai World Champion.
- Sylvie von Duuglas-Ittu – American fighter who is the WBC Minimumweight Muay Thai World Champion and holds the record for most recorded fights by a foreign fighter in Muay Thai. She is also known for her work as a journalist and documentarian.
- Sevgi Doğan – Turkish fighter who fought for the inaugural Rajadamnern Stadium Women's Bantamweight title which was the first ever championship match at a major Bangkok stadium between women.

== Boxing ==
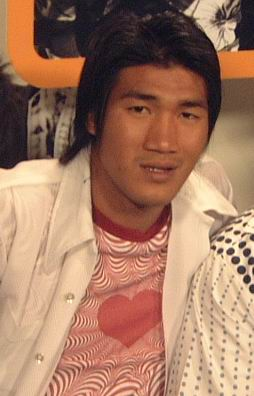
Somluck Kamsing

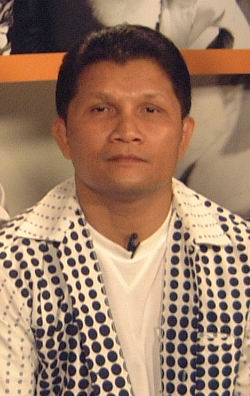
Khaosai Galaxy

- Khaosai Galaxy – was a Muay Thai fighter; switched to boxing and became WBA super flyweight champion with 19 defenses in seven years (1984–1991); with a record of 47–1, he is listed No. 19 on Ring magazine's list of 100 greatest punchers of all time and named him the 43rd greatest fighter of the past 80 years in 2002
- Somluck Kamsing – ranked No. 1 in the Lumpinee Stadium at the 57 kg (126 lbs) weight division and defeated multiple champions; switched to boxing He won Gold in Boxing at the 1996 Summer Olympics in the featherweight division, which made him the first Thai athlete to win Gold at the Olympics
- Dhawee Umponmaha – won the Lumpinee Stadium title in the 57 kg (126 lbs) division; was one of the few fighters to defeat Dieselnoi Chor Thanasukarn in a professional bout; later moved to boxing where he was a silver medalist in boxing at the 1984 Summer Olympics in the Light welterweight division
- Arkhom Chenglai – won the Lumpinee Stadium title in the 63.5 kg (140 lbs) division; won bronze medal in Boxing at the 1992 Summer Olympics
- Saensak Muangsurin – won the Lumpinee Stadium title in the 63.5 kg (140 lbs) division; WBC light welterweight champion, setting a world record by winning a world title in his third professional fight; Thailand's heaviest world boxing champion to date
- Yokthai Sithoar – won the Lumpinee Stadium title in the 52 kg (115 lbs) division. Was WBA super flyweight (115 lb) world champion in the late 90s
- Amnat Ruenroeng – won the Lumpinee Stadium title in the Flyweight division; held IBF flyweight title from 2014 to 2016
- Wanheng Menayothin – won the Lumpinee Stadium title in the 48 kg (105 lbs) division; held WBC strawweight title from 2014 to 2020
- Knockout CP Freshmart – won the Lumpinee Stadium title in the 48 kg (105 lbs) division; has held the WBA (Super) minimumweight title since 2016

== Kickboxing ==
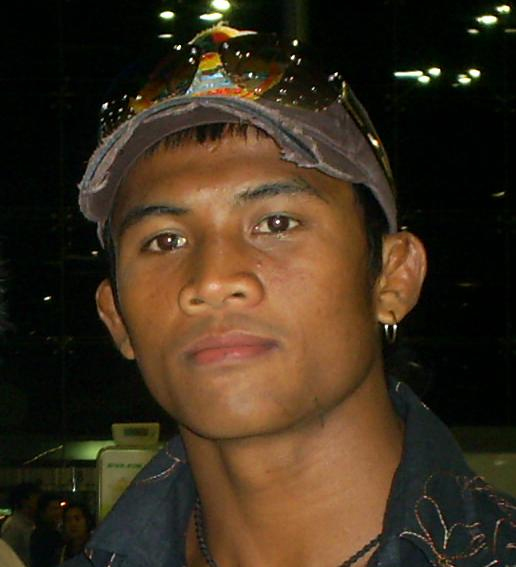
Buakaw Banchamek

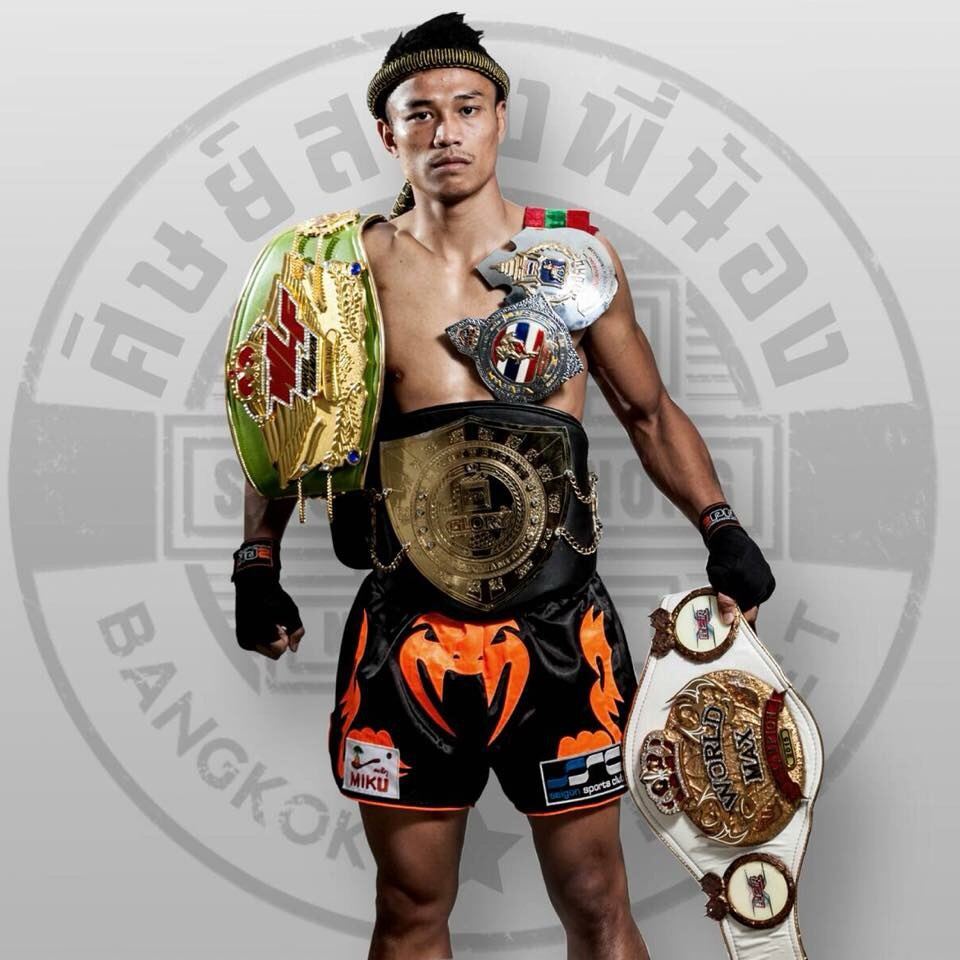
Sitthichai Sitsongpeenong

- Buakaw Banchamek – two-time K-1 World MAX champion and two-time runner up as well as a former #1-ranked fighter in Lumpinee Stadium
- Giorgio Petrosyan – 2019 ONE Kickboxing Featherweight World Grand Prix Champion and two-time K-1 World MAX champion
- Kaew Fairtex – former K-1 Super Lightweight Champion with two title defenses and three time K-1 World GP -65 kg World Tournament Champion; was Lumpinee Stadium champion in two weight divisions.
- Sitthichai Sitsongpeenong – Glory Lightweight Champion with six title defenses; Lumpinee Stadium Welterweight Champion in 2014
- Petpanomrung Kiatmuu9 – Glory Featherweight Champion with four title defenses
- Capitan Petchyindee Academy – former ONE Bantamweight Kickboxing World Champion; Lumpinee Stadium Super Welterweight Champion in 2019
- Gonnapar Weerasakreck – former K-1 Lightweight champion and former Krush Lightweight champion with three title defenses
- Superbon Banchamek – One Featherweight Kickboxing World Champion and currently rated the No. 1 Pound for pound kickboxer in the world
- Artem Vakhitov – two time Glory Light Heavyweight Champion and multiple time gold medalist at the IFMA World Muaythai Championships
- Artem Levin – former Glory Middleweight Champion and multiple time gold medalist at the IFMA World Muaythai Championships
- Marat Grigorian – former Glory Lightweight Champion
- Harut Grigorian – former Glory Welterweight Champion

== Mixed martial arts ==
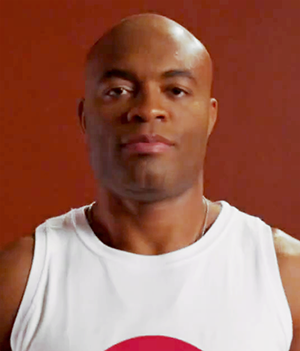
Anderson Silva

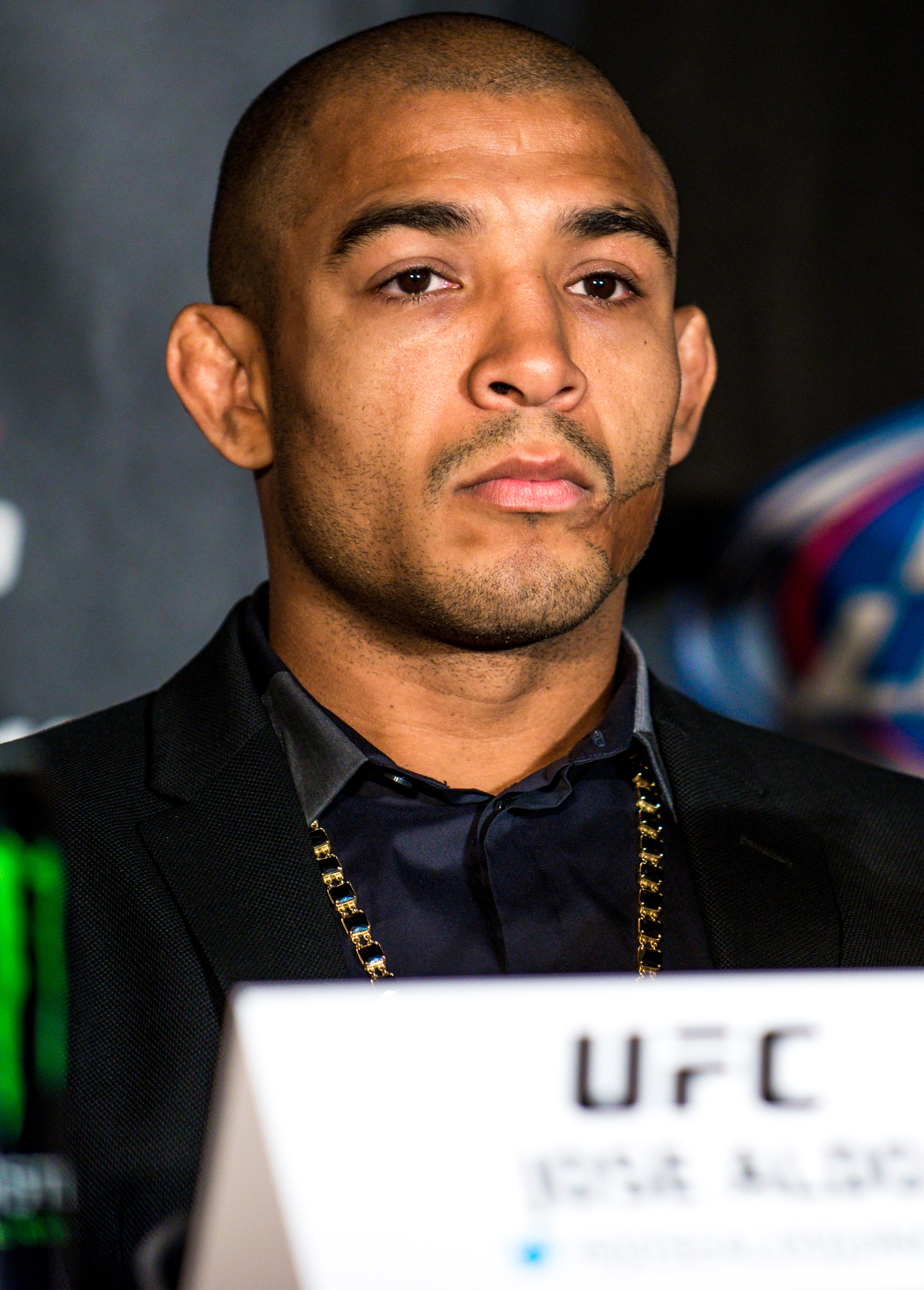
José Aldo

The following fighters are primarily known for their use of Muay Thai in MMA bouts.

- Georges Saint-Pierre - former UFC Welterweight Champion and actor
- Anderson Silva – former UFC Middleweight Champion with the highest number of title defenses (10)
- Lyoto Machida - former UFC Champion and karateka
- José Aldo – former UFC Featherweight Champion with the highest number of title defenses (7)
- Valentina Shevchenko – current UFC Women's Flyweight Champion with the highest number of title defenses (8); multiple time gold medalist at the IFMA World Muaythai Championships
- Joanna Jędrzejczyk – former UFC Women's Strawweight Champion with the highest number of title defenses (5); multiple time gold medalist at the IFMA World Muaythai Championships
- Cris Cyborg – current Bellator Women's Featherweight champion and former UFC Women's Featherweight champion
- Maurício Rua – former UFC Light Heavyweight Champion and 2005 PRIDE Middleweight Grand Prix Champion
- Wanderlei Silva – former PRIDE Middleweight Champion and the 2003 PRIDE Middleweight Grand Prix Tournament Champion
- Alistair Overeem – former Strikeforce Heavyweight champion and winner of the K-1 World Grand Prix 2010 Final
- Jan Błachowicz – former UFC Light Heavyweight champion; 2008 gold medalist at the IFMA World Muaythai Championships
- Jiří Procházka – former UFC Light Heavyweight champion and former Rizin FC Light Heavyweight champion; 2011 Czech National Champion in Muay Thai
- Ciryl Gane – former interim UFC Heavyweight champion and undefeated Muay Thai fighter
- Rafael Cordeiro – three time Brazilian national Muay Thai champion; was striking coach at the Chute Boxe Academy and Kings MMA where he trained multiple MMA world champions including Anderson Silva, Cris Cyborg, Maurício Rua and Wanderlei Silva

== Entertainment ==
- Tony Jaa – Thai martial artist, actor, action choreographer, stuntman, director, traceur and former Buddhist monk
- Donnie Yen - Chinese actor and martial artist

== Other ==
- GypsyCrusader - American internet personality and white supremacist. He is also a Muay Thai fighter and trainer.
