= Sevgi Doğan =

Turkish Muay Thai Kickboxer (born 2002)

- Born: Sevgi Doğan; May 30, 2002 (age 24); Osmaniye, Turkey
- Other names: Ice Queen
- Nationality: Turkish
- Height: 170 cm (5 ft 7 in)
- Weight: 53.5 kg (118 lb; 8 st 6 lb)
- Division: Bantamweight
- Style: Kickboxing; Muay Thai; Boxing
- Fighting out of: Turkey
- Years active: 2012-present

Kickboxing record
- Total: 202
- Wins: 176
- By knockout: 41
- Losses: 26

Other information
- Occupation: Athlete
- University: Trabzon University (Sport science department)
- Notable relatives: Zehra Doğan (Sister); Zeliha Doğan (Sister)

Sevgi Doğan (born May 30, 2002; in Osmaniye), is a Turkish Muaythai Kickboxer.[1] She is a first ever Women's Rajadamnern Stadium title challenger with Somratsamee Manopgym.[2] Doğan is a WBC Muaythai Bantamweight world title challenger. She is a former IFMA and WAKO world and European champion.[3]

== Early life ==
Doğan born in a martial arts family as her father was a Taekwondo master. She is a small sister of Zehra, The first Turkish women WBC Muaythai world champion.

== Sports career ==
=== International Federation of Muaythai Associations ===
In 2018 Doğan won gold medals in the IFMA Europe Championship. In 2019 she won bronze medals in the IFMA Europe championship.

=== World Association of Kickboxing Organizations ===
In 2019 Doğan won WAKO Europe Cup gold medals.

=== Rajadamnern World Series ===
On December 23, 2023, Doğan faced Somratsamee Manopgym in the first ever Women's Rajadamnern Stadium title fight. She lost the fight by unanimous decision.

=== WBC Muay Thai ===
On April 23, 2024, Doğan challenged Saneh Jaan Sor.Jor.Tongpraeen for the WBC Muaythai world Bantamweight title.

== Titles and accomplishments ==
=== Amateur ===
- International Boxing Association
  - (gold) 3 times boxing national champion
- International Federation of Muaythai Associations
  - (gold) 2018 IFMA 51 kg Europe Championship
  - (bronze) 2019 IFMA 51 kg World Championship
- World Association of Kickboxing Organizations
  - (gold) 2019 WAKO 52 kg Europe Cup

== Fight record ==
Professional Muay Thai record
176 Wins (41 (T)KO's), 26 Losses, 0 Draw
| Date | Result | Opponent | Event | Location | Method | Round | Time |
| 2026-05-02 | Win | (Greece) Chrysanthi Frantzeskaki | Loca Fight Club | Istanbul, Turkey | Decision | 3 | 3:00 |
| 2025-10-04 | Loss | (Thailand) Karaked Por.Muangpetch | Rajadamnern World Series | Bangkok, Thailand | Decision (Unanimous) | 3 | 2:00 |
| 2025-08-02 | Loss | (Canada) Morgane Mary-Pouliot | Rajadamnern World Series | Bangkok, Thailand | Decision (Unanimous) | 3 | 2:00 |
| 2025-01-11 | Win | (Brazil) Milena Calazans Silva | Rajadamnern World Series | Bangkok, Thailand | Decision | 3 | 2:00 |
| 2024-09-28 | Win | (United Kingdom) Brulinda Dushku | Rajadamnern World Series | Bangkok, Thailand | Decision | 3 | 2:00 |
| 2024-08-16 | Win | (Iran) Faezeh Fali | Rajadamnern Knockout | Bangkok, Thailand | KO | | |
| 2024-05-25 | Loss | (Brazil) Maria Eduarda | Rajadamnern World Series | Bangkok, Thailand | Decision (Unanimous) | 3 | 2:00 |
| 2024-04-23 | Loss | (Thailand) Saneh Jaan Sor.Jor.Tongpraeen | Venum Fight, Rajadamnern Stadium | Bangkok, Thailand | Decision (Unanimous) | 5 | 3:00 |
For the vacant WBC Muay Thai World Bantamweight (118 lb) title.
| 2024-02-24 | Win | (Japan) Mayu Aoki | UAM Fight Night | Abu Dhabi, United Arab Emirates | Decision | | |
| 2023-12-23 | Loss | (Thailand) Somratsamee Manopgym | Rajadamnern World Series | Bangkok, Thailand | Decision (Unanimous) | 5 | 2:00 |
For the inaugural Rajadamnern Stadium Women's Bantamweight (118 lb) title.
| 2023-08-26 | Loss | (Thailand) Ngaoprajan Looksaikongdin | Rajadamnern World Series | Bangkok, Thailand | Decision | 3 | 2:00 |
| 2023-07-15 | Win | (Thailand) Jitti SorSor.ChiangMai | Rajadamnern World Series | Bangkok, Thailand | Decision | 3 | 2:00 |
| 2023-06-10 | Win | (Spain) Paloma Arranz | Rajadamnern World Series | Bangkok, Thailand | Decision | 3 | 2:00 |
| 2023-05-06 | Win | (Thailand) Kamlaipetch PetchyindeeAcademy | Rajadamnern World Series | Bangkok, Thailand | Decision | 3 | 2:00 |
Legend: Win Loss Draw/No contest Notes

== See also ==
- Rajadamnern Stadium
- List of female kickboxers
- List of Muay Thai practitioners
- Venum
