= Venum =

Sportswear brand & martial arts training camp

- Type: Private
- Industry: Martial arts apparel
- Founded: 2006; 20 years ago
- Founder: Franck Dupuis and André Vieira
- Products: Martial arts equipment, sporting equipment, clothing, accessories
- Services: Manufacturer, fighter management
- Website: www.venum.com

Venum is a French manufacturer of apparel and equipment for various martial arts, combat sports, and fitness including mixed martial arts, boxing, Brazilian jiu-jitsu, Muay Thai , Kun Khmer and Karate. Venum operates in several areas around the world including Brazil, America, Europe, and Asia. Venum became the official outfitting partner of the UFC in 2021.

== History ==
Venum was created in 2006 by Franck Dupuis and André Vieira.

=== Partnership with UFC ===
On July 10, 2020, it was announced that Venum would become the official outfitting partner of the UFC, replacing Reebok after the end of their six-year deal.

On March 7, 2024, the partnership between Venum and the UFC had been extended through 2029.

== Venum Training Camp ==
The Venum Training Camp (VTC) is a mixed martial arts, Muay Thai and Brazilian jiu-jitsu gym founded by Mehdi Zavctout based in Pattaya, and has produced several successful fighters.

== Notable fighters, trainers, and coaches ==
Other sponsored athletes include:

- Jorge Linares
- Vasyl Lomachenko
- Ciryl Gane
- Callum Smith
- Giorgio Petrosyan
- Sitthichai Sitsongpeenong
- Jordan Burroughs
- Kyle Dake
- Kyle Snyder
- J’den Cox
- Bo Nickal
- Pat Downey
- Kurt Angle
- Lyoto Machida
- Carlos Condit
- José Aldo
- Miesha Tate
- Mauricio Rua
- Wanderlei Silva
- Fabrício Werdum
- Martin Kampmann
- Jim Miller
- Brad Pickett
- Alaverdi Ramazanov
- Nabil Anane
- Adam Noi
- Sajad Sattari
- Pat Downey
- Zehra Doğan
- Mohammad Siasarani
- Natalya Dyachkova
- Benoit Saint-Denis
- Sevgi Doğan
- Patrick Habirora
- Nassourdine Imavov

== See also ==
- Mixed martial arts clothing
