= Dejrit Ithianuchit =

Thai professional Muay Thai fighter

- Born: Thongplew Srinop; October 17, 1940; Bang Nam Priao, Chachoengsao, Thailand
- Died: March 2, 2023 (aged 83)
- Native name: ทองปลิว ศรีนพ
- Other names: Dejrit Yontharakit (เดชฤทธิ์ ยนตรกิจ); Dejrit Ithrabut (เดชฤทธิ์ อินทรบุตร); Dejrit Sriayutthaya; Dejrit Na Bangkok
- Nickname: Breezing Diamond Heart (ปลิวใจเพชร)
- Height: 174 cm (5 ft 9 in)
- Division: Featherweight; Lightweight; Welterweight
- Style: Muay Thai (Muay Mat)
- Stance: Orthodox
- Team: Yontharakit Gym (1959-1963); Ithianuchit Gym (1963-1971); Na Bangkok Gym (1971-1974)
- Trainer: Sudjai Amornrit; Jumpol Sri Ayutthaya
- Years active: c. 1958-1974

Other information
- Boxing record from BoxRec

Thongplew Srinop (Thai: ทองปลิว ศรีนพ; October 17, 1940 – March 2, 2023), known professionally as Dejrit Ithianuchit (Thai: เดชฤทธิ์ อิทธิอนุชิต), was a Thai professional Muay Thai fighter. He was a three-division Rajadamnern Stadium champion who was famous during the 1960s and 1970s.

== Biography and career ==
=== Early years ===
Born in Chachoengsao province, Thailand, Dejrit moved to Bangkok when he was 7 years old. He started training soon after under boxing coach Chumpol Sri Ayutthaya. He won his first amateur boxing bout, but his mother urged him to stop out of concern for his future and urged him to complete his education first.

Dejrit did not box again for a decade until he graduated from Indrachai Technical College, earning a vocational certificate as an engineer.

=== Career ===
After several months of not being able to find a job, Dejrit turned to his old boxing coach and took on the name Dejrit Sriayutthaya. He had his first fight, a knockout win at Rajadamnern Stadium in 1958. Mr. Chumpol tried to get Dejrit boxing fights but few fighters were willing to compete under boxing rules.

In 1959, Dejrit left his boxing coach and joined the renowned Yontarakit Gym owned by Tankee and his son Chaiyut Yontharakit in Chachoengsao province, training alongside fighters such as Somdej, Kiewwan, Saipetch, and Danchai Yontharakit. At Yontharakit Gym, Dejrit was able to win the Rajadamnern Stadium Featherweight (126 lbs) title by knocking out Rerngsak Sor.Lukpitak in 1961, a division which he quickly outgrew. The following year, Dejrit defeated Adisak Kwangmeechai for the Rajadamnern Stadium Lightweight (135 lbs) title.

In 1963, following the death of Yontharakit Gym owner Tankee, Dejrit moved to Thawee Chomchalao's Ithianuchit gym under the promoter Thiamboon Inthabutra, where he would become a top fighter alongside future OPBF Champion Suleman Ithianuchit. In the following years he would fight Adul Srisothon, Rawee Dechachai, Huasai Sittiboonlert, Sompong Jaroenmuang, former campmate Danchai Ploenjit, Kongdej Lukbangplasoi, Wicharn Sor.Pinjisak, etc. But nothing compared to his infamous rivalry against Apidej Sit-Hirun, The King's Fighter of the Century. Dejrit defeated Apidej four times, but Apidej came out on top with seven wins, one of which was under Western boxing rules.

On May 8, 1963, His Majesty Rama IX personally gave Dejrit the "Royal Cup" for defeating Rakkiat Kiatmuangyop at Lumpinee Stadium. He was the second recipient of the award as the previous was given to his former campmate Namsak Yontharakit in 1961 for defeating Adul Srisothon.

In 1966, he defeated Suponchai Jaroenmuang for the vacant Rajadamnern Stadium Welterweight (147 lbs) title which he then defended against Apidej Sit-Hirun. He lost the title to Apidej in a rematch in January 1968, but later took it back in November of the same year. It was his fourth and last major title that he would win.

In 1971, he transferred to Na Bangkok Gym owned by Narong Kittikachorn while serving in the military, but as he had entered his 30s, his physical condition declined and he could no longer fight at the high level he once did.

At his peak, Dejrit received a purse of ฿80,000 Thai baht, the highest purse in the history of Muay Thai as of 1967. At the end of his career, he was able to buy himself a Mercedes car.

In 2011, Dejrit and his former campmate Kiewwan Yontharakit were inducted into the Siam Kela Hall of Fame for their accomplishments in the sport. At the ceremony, he expressed his happiness and gratitude towards the selection committee for not having forgotten him.

=== Personal life and retirement ===
At 34 years of age, Dejrit retired from the sport as his body could no longer carry the damage from his pressure-fighting style. He continued to serve in the Thai Armed Forces, holding the rank of Lieutenant. After retiring from the military, he lived with his wife Nittaya and their five children. Dejrit formed an unsuccessful band and would occasionally sing at the Elizabeth Hotel in Bangkok.

In January 2019, Dejrit was reported missing by his son as he had checked out of Phramongkutklao Hospital in Bangkok without informing his family. His son implored the community to look out for Dejrit as he had memory issues. He was later found and brought back home.

On March 2, 2023, he died peacefully in his home in Phaya Thai at 82 years old.

The week after, on March 7, 2023, he received a state funeral and cremation ceremony in Bangkok, attended by his relatives, several former politicians, the Thai Prime Minister's Spokesperson Anucha Burapachaisri, the Director of Rangsit Boxing Stadium, and many of his peers and campmates such as Pudpadnoi Worawut, Padejsuk Pitsanurachan, Thongbai Jaroenmuang, and Rawee Dechachai.

== Championships and awards ==
Rajadamnern Stadium

- 1961 Rajadamnern Stadium Featherweight (126 lbs) Champion
- 1963 Rajadamnern Stadium Lightweight (135 lbs) Champion
- 1968 Rajadamnern Stadium Welterweight (147 lbs) Champion

Awards

- 1963 "Royal Cup"
- 2011 Siam Kela Hall of Famer (Muay Thai)

== Muay Thai record ==
Muay Thai Record (Incomplete)
Date	Result	Opponent	Event	Location	Method	Round	Time
1974	Loss	(Thailand) Mo Sor.Lukpitak		Bangkok, Thailand	Decision	5	3:00
1973-02-16	Loss	(Thailand) Chuchai Lukbanjama	Lumpinee Stadium	Bangkok, Thailand	KO	2	
For the Royal Thai Armed Forces Welterweight (147 lbs) title.
1972	Loss	(Thailand) Yodsing Sor.Phayathai		Bangkok, Thailand			
1972-05-21	Loss	(Thailand) Songkiat Kiatpracharat	Channel 7 Stadium	Bangkok, Thailand			
1972	Loss	(Thailand) Chuchai Lukbanjama	Royal Thai Armed Forces Muay Thai Championship	Bangkok, Thailand			
1971	Loss	(Thailand) Prabsuk Sirikorn		Bangkok, Thailand			
1971	Win	(Thailand) Chakkrit		Bangkok, Thailand	KO		
1970	Loss	(Thailand) Yodthong Saitsuk		Bangkok, Thailand			
1970-	Loss	(Thailand) Huasai Sittiboonlert		Bangkok, Thailand	KO (Kick)		
1970-05-29	Loss	(Thailand) Apidej Sit-Hirun	Lumpinee Stadium	Bangkok, Thailand	Decision	5	3:00
1970-03-20	Win	(Thailand) Huasai Sittiboonlert	Chartchai Chionoi vs Efren Torres, Huamark Stadium	Bangkok, Thailand	Decision	5	3:00
1970	Loss	(Thailand) Taek Rawee	Rajadamnern Stadium	Bangkok, Thailand			
1969-11-21	Loss	(Thailand) Kongdej Lukbangplasoi	Lumpinee Stadium	Bangkok, Thailand	Decision	5	3:00
1969-09-	Win	(Thailand) Phananan Lukbanjama	Lumpinee Stadium	Bangkok, Thailand			
1969-07-04	Win	(Thailand) Narong Pitsarunachan	Lumpinee Stadium	Bangkok, Thailand	TKO (Elbow)	4	
1969	Win	(Thailand) Sompong Jaroenmuang	Rajadamnern Stadium	Bangkok, Thailand	Decision	5	3:00
1969-04-08	Loss	(Thailand) Kongdej Lukbangplasoi		Bangkok, Thailand	Decision	5	3:00
1968-11-10	Win	(Thailand) Apidej Sit-Hirun	Charusathian Stadium, Chionoi vs Villacampo	Bangkok, Thailand	KO	1	0:40
Wins the Rajadamnern Stadium Welterweight (147 lbs) title.
1968	Win	(Thailand) Sukkasem Fahlaeb		Bangkok, Thailand			
1968-08-21	Loss	(Thailand) Apidej Sit-Hirun	Rajadamnern Stadium	Bangkok, Thailand	Decision	5	3:00
1968-01-15	Loss	(Thailand) Apidej Sit-Hirun	Rajadamnern Stadium	Bangkok, Thailand	KO (Right cross)	3	
Loses the Rajadamnern Stadium Welterweight (147 lbs) title.
1967-09-27	Win	(Thailand) Apidej Sit-Hirun	Lumpinee Stadium	Bangkok, Thailand	KO (Punches)	3	
Apidej is stripped of his Ceremonial Thailand and Lumpinee Stadium Welterweight (147 lbs) title for being knocked out.
1967-08	Win	(Thailand) Danchai Ploenjit	Rajadamnern Stadium	Bangkok, Thailand	KO (Right cross)	1	
1967-07-26	Win	(Thailand) Danchai Ploenjit	Huamark Stadium, Chionoi vs Pantip Kaewsuriya	Bangkok, Thailand	KO (Left cross)	1	
Both fighters earned a record purse of ฿80,000 Thai baht.
1967-07-03	Win	(Thailand) Detthai Rachadet	Rajadamnern Stadium	Bangkok, Thailand	TKO (Punches)	2	
1967-06-07	Win	(Thailand) Suponchai Jaroenmuang	Rajadamnern Stadium	Bangkok, Thailand	TKO (Low kicks)	2	
1967	Win	(Thailand) Prakaikaew Luk Sor.Kor.	Rajadamnern Stadium	Bangkok, Thailand	TKO	4	
1967-04-03	Win	(Thailand) Apidej Sit-Hirun	Rajadamnern Stadium	Bangkok, Thailand	TKO	3	
1967-03-06	Win	(Thailand) Sompong Jaroenmuang	Rajadamnern Stadium	Bangkok, Thailand	Decision	5	3:00
1966-05-12	Loss	(Thailand) Supachai Jaroenmuang	Rajadamnern Stadium	Bangkok, Thailand	Decision	5	3:00
For the vacant Rajadamnern Stadium Welterweight (147 lbs) title.
1966-10-17	Win	(Thailand) Adul Srisothon	Rajadamnern Stadium	Bangkok, Thailand	TKO	5	
1966	Win	(Thailand) Rawee Dechachai	Rajadamnern Stadium	Bangkok, Thailand	Decision	5	3:00
1966	Win	(Thailand) Somkiat Kiatmuangyom	Rajadamnern Stadium	Bangkok, Thailand	Decision	5	3:00
1966	Win	(Thailand) Wichan Sor.Pinjinsak	Rajadamnern Stadium	Bangkok, Thailand	Decision	5	3:00
1965-12-07	Win	(Thailand) Payap Sakulsuk	Lumpinee Stadium	Bangkok, Thailand	KO	4	
1965-10-	Win	(Thailand) Weeradej Sor.Lukpitak	Rajadamnern Stadium	Bangkok, Thailand	KO (Body kick)	3	
1965-09-28	Loss	(Thailand) Sompong Jaroenmuang	Lumpinee Stadium	Bangkok, Thailand	Decision	5	3:00
1965-08-12	Draw	(Thailand) Sompong Jaroenmuang	Lumpinee Stadium	Bangkok, Thailand	Decision	5	3:00
1965-03-31	Win	(Thailand) Prakaikaew Luk Sor.Kor.	Lumpinee Stadium	Bangkok, Thailand	KO	1	
1965-02-17	Win	(Thailand) Payap Sakulsuk	Lumpinee Stadium	Bangkok, Thailand	KO (Punches)	1	
1964-11-03	Loss	(Thailand) Apidej Sit-Hirun	Lumpinee Stadium	Bangkok, Thailand	Decision	5	3:00
For the Ceremonial Thailand Welterweight (147 lbs) title.
1964-08-04	Loss	(Thailand) Apidej Sit-Hirun	Lumpinee Stadium	Bangkok, Thailand	TKO (Doctor stoppage)	2	
For the Lumpinee Stadium Welterweight (147 lbs) title and the inaugural Ceremonial Thailand Welterweight (147 lbs) title. Apidej receives the Yodmuaythai trophy.
1964-03	Win	(Thailand) Somkiat Kiatmuangyom	Rajadamnern Stadium	Bangkok, Thailand			
1964-02-13	Win	(Thailand) Apidej Sit-Hirun	Rajadamnern Stadium	Bangkok, Thailand	Decision	5	3:00
1963-11-14	Win	(Thailand) Sornchai Malayut	Rajadamnern Stadium	Bangkok, Thailand	Decision	5	3:00
1963-10-03	Win	(Thailand) Sompong Jaroenmuang	Rajadamnern Stadium	Bangkok, Thailand	KO (High kick)	4	
1963-09-05	Win	(Thailand) Wichan Sor.Pinjisak	Rajadamnern Stadium	Bangkok, Thailand	Decision	5	3:00
Defends the Rajadamnern Stadium Lightweight (135 lbs) title.
1963-06-06	Loss	(Thailand) Apidej Sit-Hirun	Rajadamnern Stadium	Bangkok, Thailand	Decision	5	3:00
1963-05-08	Loss	(Thailand) Rakkiat Kiatmuangyop	Lumpinee Stadium	Bangkok, Thailand	Decision	5	3:00
Dejrit receives the Royal Cup.
1962-03-15	Loss	(Thailand) Wichan Sor.Pinjisak	Rajadamnern Stadium	Bangkok, Thailand	KO (Elbow)	3	
1963-02-28	Win	(Thailand) Adisak Kwangmeechai	Rajadamnern Stadium	Bangkok, Thailand	KO	2	
Wins the vacant Rajadamnern Stadium Lightweight (135 lbs) title.
1963-01-08	Win	(Thailand) Rawee Dechachai	Rajadamnern Stadium	Bangkok, Thailand	Decision	5	3:00
1962-12-06	Loss	(Thailand) Adul Srisothon	Rajadamnern Stadium	Bangkok, Thailand	Decision	5	3:00
For the Rajadamnern Stadium Lightweight (135 lbs) title.
1962	Win	(Thailand) Weeradej Sor.Lukpitak	Rajadamnern Stadium	Bangkok, Thailand			
1962	Win	(Thailand) Weeradej Sor.Lukpitak	Rajadamnern Stadium	Bangkok, Thailand			
1962-09-18	Win	(Thailand) Khunsuknoi Sor.Bangkholaem	Lumpinee Stadium	Bangkok, Thailand	Decision	5	3:00
1962	Win	(Thailand) Khunsuknoi Sor.Bangkholaem	Rajadamnern Stadium	Bangkok, Thailand			
1961	Win	(Thailand) Wichan Sor.Pinjisak	Rajadamnern Stadium	Bangkok, Thailand	Decision	5	3:00
1961	Loss	(Thailand) Wichan Sor.Pinjisak	Rajadamnern Stadium	Bangkok, Thailand			
1961-06-13	Loss	(Thailand) Pichai Ratchawat	Lumpinee Stadium	Bangkok, Thailand	KO	3	
1961	Win	(Thailand) Rerngsak Sor.Lukpitak	Rajadamnern Stadium	Bangkok, Thailand	KO	3	
Wins the vacant Rajadamnern Stadium Featherweight (126 lbs) title.
1961-02-14	Loss	(Thailand) Chainoi Singworanat		Bangkok, Thailand	Decision	5	3:00
1960-09-13	Win	(Thailand) Namchai Klongphajon	Lumpinee Stadium	Bangkok, Thailand	KO	4	
1960	Win	(Thailand) Pongsak Lerdkamon	Rajadamnern Stadium	Bangkok, Thailand	KO		
1960	Win	(Thailand) Pongkaew Bangyikan	Rajadamnern Stadium	Bangkok, Thailand			
1960	Loss	(Thailand) Sompong Jaroenmuang	Rajadamnern Stadium	Bangkok, Thailand	Decision	5	3:00
1959	Win	(Thailand) Pichai Ratchawat	Rajadamnern Stadium	Bangkok, Thailand	Decision	5	3:00
1959	Win	(Thailand) Pichai Ratchawat	Rajadamnern Stadium	Bangkok, Thailand	Decision	5	3:00
1959	Loss	(Thailand) Pichai Ratchawat	Rajadamnern Stadium	Bangkok, Thailand	KO	3	
1958	Win	(Thailand) Narongsak Wongthewet	Rajadamnern Stadium	Bangkok, Thailand	KO	3	
Legend: Win Loss Draw/No contest Notes
