= Adul Srisothorn =

Thai professional Muay Thai fighter and boxer (1940-1976)

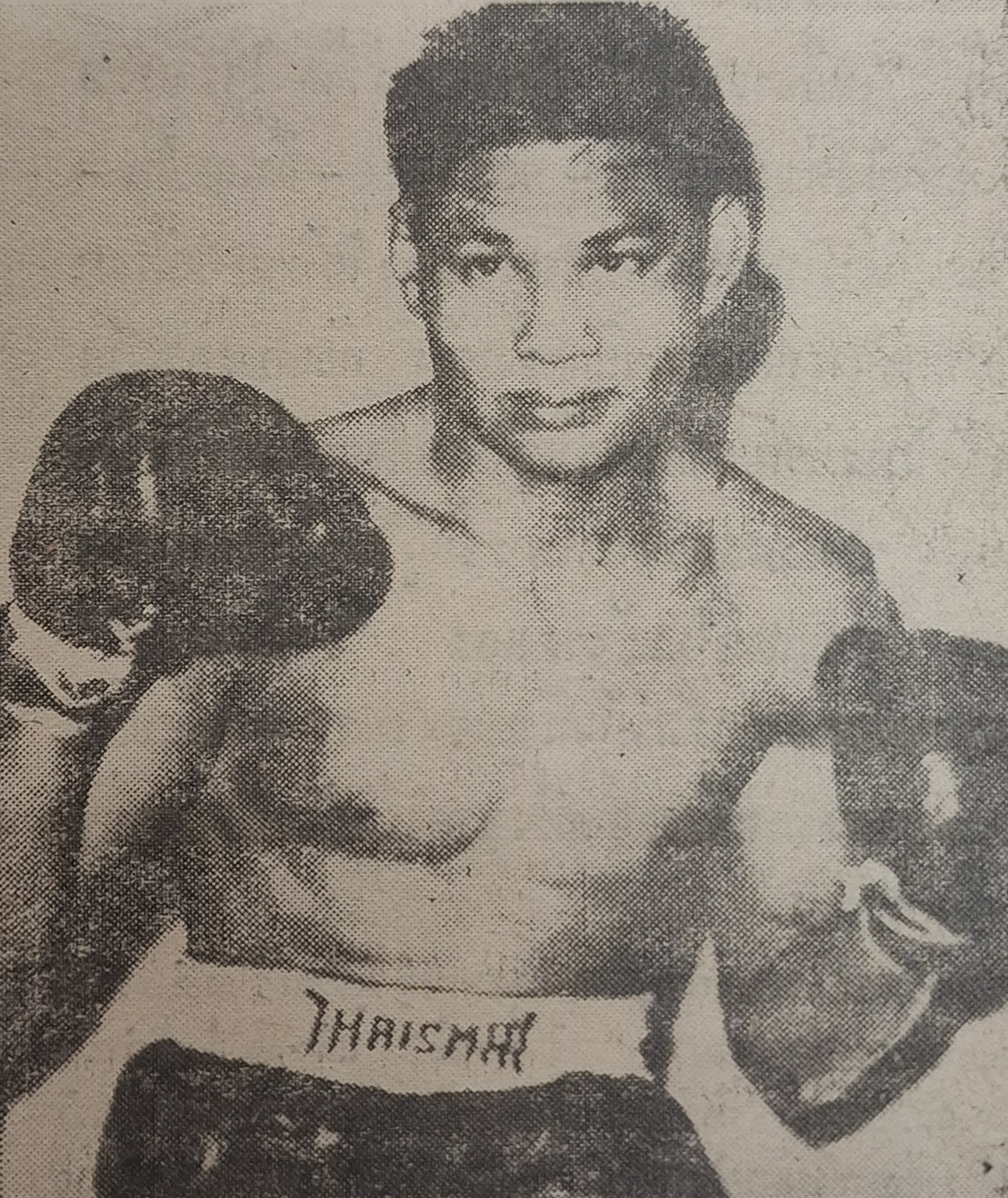
- Born: Adul Suksamran; May 30, 1940; Ban Pho, Chachoengsao, Thailand
- Died: February 18, 1976 (aged 36)
- Native name: อดุลย์ สุขสำราญ
- Nickname: Diamond Crown Champion (แชมป์มงกุฏเพชร)
- Height: 170 cm (5 ft 7 in)
- Division: Featherweight; Lightweight; Super Lightweight
- Style: Muay Thai (Muay Femur / Muay Khao)
- Stance: Southpaw
- Years active: c. 1954–1968

Other information
- Boxing record from BoxRec

Adul Suksamran (Thai: อดุลย์ สุขสำราญ; May 30, 1940 – February 18, 1976), known professionally as Adul Srisothorn (Thai: อดุลย์ ศรีโสธร), was a Thai professional Muay Thai fighter and boxer. He was a one-time Lumpinee Stadium champion and two-time Rajadamnern Stadium champion across two divisions who was famous during the 1950s and 1960s.

== Biography and career ==
=== Early years ===
Born in Chachoengsao province, he and his brother Den started training in Muay Thai under their physical education teacher Mr. Uthai Plaranya at 13 years old. Two years later, under the name Adul Benjamasit, in reference to his school, Benjamarajrangsit located in Chachoengsao, he would start fighting professionally. For his first fight, a knockout win in a makeshift ring in Bang Pakong, he was given 12 Thai baht.

=== Career ===
Later in 1955, he started fighting at Rajadamnern Stadium after having built up his reputation in his home province. Adul fought for the Srisothon promotion and by the end of the year, his promoter Boonsong Kiatklasuan took him in and made him the first fighter of the new Srisothon gym, followed by his brother Den.

By 1958, Adul had become one of the most popular fighters in the circuit. He won a title in the 112 lbs category, held at Lumpinee Stadium and was awarded a diamond-embedded brooch in the shape of a crown, giving him his nickname "the Diamond Crown Champion."

In November 1961, Adul main evented a show in presence of His Majesty Bhumibol Adulyadej, at Rajadamnern Stadium promoted by Thiamboon Ithianuchit. Adul lost to Yontharakit Gym ace Namsak Yontharakit, and in the co-main event, Kiewwan Yontharakit defeated South Korea's Se Chul Kang for the Welterweight OPBF title. After the fights, Namsak and Kiewwan were personally awarded the first King's Cups by the King himself in the ring, for excellence in Muay Thai and Western Boxing respectively.

In 1962, he had an exhibition match against a 200-lb Indian wrestler. Adul opened with leg kicks and won by knockout with a single punch within 2 minutes, an event which made international news. The legitimacy of the match was brought into question due to the speed at which the wrestler was dispatched.

At the end of 1962, after having cleared out his division and with the hardest competition, Dejrit Ithianuchit and Apidej Sit-Hirun having moved up to Welterweight, Adul went into boxing full-time. He won the Lightweight boxing title of Lumpinee Stadium against Danchai Ploenjit and the Lightweight boxing title of Rajadamnern Stadium against Somkiat Kiatmuangyom. Adul fought twice for the OPBF Super Lightweight against Bert Somodio but lost both times. His time in boxing proved ultimately unsuccessful, so he returned to Muay Thai in 1964 where he would also take a steep decline, retiring just four years later.

For a short time, he was a camp junior of Prayut Udomsak and a camp senior of his brother Den Srisothon, who was also a three-time Rajadamnern Stadium Champion.

In 1984, Rajadamnern Stadium released a list of their ten greatest Nak Muay in history, Adul was ranked 5th behind his seniors Prayut Udomsak, Chuchai Prakanchai, Suk Prasarthinpimai, and Pon Prapradaeng.

=== Personal life and retirement ===
Adul retired in 1968 at the age of 28 years old after a series of losses. He went on to become a Police Lieutenant Colonel.

Just after a devastating January for the Muay Thai world where famous fighters Pon Prapradaeng, Ponchai Sor.Tawan, and Tawan Wongthewet died, on February 18, 1978, Adul was caught up in a car accident while patrolling the Asian Highway. He and three others were killed in the crash.

== Titles and accomplishments ==
Muay Thai

- Rajadamnern Stadium
  - 1959 Rajadamnern Stadium Featherweight (126 lbs) Champion
  - 1960 Rajadamnern Stadium Lightweight (135 lbs) Champion
    - Two successful title defenses
- Lumpinee Stadium
  - 1960 Lumpinee Stadium Lightweight (135 lbs) Champion

Boxing

- Rajadamnern Stadium
  - 1963 Rajadamnern Stadium Lightweight (135 lbs) Champion
- Lumpinee Stadium
  - 1962 Lumpinee Stadium Lightweight (135 lbs) Champion

== Muay Thai record ==
Muay Thai Record (Incomplete)
Date	Result	Opponent	Event	Location	Method	Round	Time
1968-10-18	Loss	(Thailand) Mongkoldej Pitakchai		Thailand	Decision	5	3:00
1968-07-29	Loss	(Thailand) Jensuk Sakhulthai	Rajadamnern Stadium	Bangkok, Thailand	Decision	5	3:00
1968-02-26	Loss	(Thailand) Sompong Jaroenmuang	Rajadamnern Stadium	Bangkok, Thailand	Decision	5	3:00
1968-01-15	Win	(Thailand) Pongsing Klongpajon	Rajadamnern Stadium	Bangkok, Thailand	TKO (Knees)	3	
1967-10-11	Loss	(Thailand) Fahpet SingUbon	Huamark Stadium	Bangkok, Thailand	KO (Head Kick)	4	
1967-06-12	Loss	(Thailand) Thongbai Jaroenmuang	Rajadamnern Stadium	Bangkok, Thailand	Decision	5	3:00
1967-05-17	Win	(Thailand) Suwitnoi Lukbangplasoi	Rajadamnern Stadium	Bangkok, Thailand	Decision	5	3:00
1966-10-17	Loss	(Thailand) Dejrit Ithianuchit	Rajadamnern Stadium	Bangkok, Thailand	TKO	5	
1966-06-30	Win	(Thailand) Ponsak Laemfahpa	Rajadamnern Stadium	Bangkok, Thailand	Decision	5	3:00
1966-05-26	Loss	(Thailand) Danchai Ploenjit	Rajadamnern Stadium	Bangkok, Thailand	Decision	5	3:00
1966-05-15	Win	(Thailand) Kiewwan Yontharakit	Rajadamnern Stadium	Bangkok, Thailand	Decision	5	3:00
1966-03-31	Win	(Thailand) Prabthoranee Ploenjit	Rajadamnern Stadium	Bangkok, Thailand	Decision	5	3:00
1965	Draw	(Thailand) Wichan Sor.Pinjisak		Bangkok, Thailand	Decision	5	3:00
1965-08-12	Draw	(Thailand) Payap Sakulsuek	Rajadamnern Stadium	Bangkok, Thailand	Decision	5	3:00
1965-03-18	Loss	(Thailand) Wichan Sor.Pinjisak	Rajadamnern Stadium	Bangkok, Thailand	Decision	5	3:00
1965-01-14	Loss	(Thailand) Sompong Jaroenmuang	Rajadamnern Stadium	Bangkok, Thailand	KO (Elbow)	4	
1964-10-21	Loss	(Thailand) Rawee Detchatchai	Rajadamnern Stadium	Bangkok, Thailand	Decision	5	3:00
1964-08-13	Loss	(Thailand) Wichan Sor.Pinjisak	Rajadamnern Stadium	Bangkok, Thailand	Decision	5	3:00
1964-03-12	Loss	(Thailand) Wichan Sor.Pinjisak	Rajadamnern Stadium	Bangkok, Thailand	KO (Head Kick)	1	
1962-12-06	Win	(Thailand) Dejrit Ithianuchit	Rajadamnern Stadium	Bangkok, Thailand	Decision	5	3:00
Defends the Rajadamnern Stadium Lightweight (135 lbs) title.
1962	Win	(Thailand) Payap Sakulsuk	Lumpinee Stadium	Bangkok, Thailand	Decision	5	3:00
1962-09-13	Loss	(Thailand) Apidej Sit-Hirun	Rajadamnern Stadium	Bangkok, Thailand	Decision	5	3:00
For the Yodmuaythai trophy.
1962-08-02	Win	(Thailand) Sompong Jaroenmuang	Rajadamnern Stadium	Bangkok, Thailand	Decision	5	3:00
1962-05-10	Win	(Thailand) Samart Sorndaeng	Rajadamnern Stadium	Bangkok, Thailand	TKO (Referee Stoppage)	2	
1962-04-03	Win	(Pakistan) Niwan Jan Singh	Lumpinee Stadium	Bangkok, Thailand	KO (Punch)	1	
1962-	Win	(Thailand) Namsak Yontharakit	Rajadamnern Stadium	Bangkok, Thailand	Decision	5	3:00
1962-01-11	Draw	(Thailand) Rawee Detchatchai	Rajadamnern Stadium	Bangkok, Thailand	Decision	5	3:00
1961-11-13	Loss	(Thailand) Namsak Yontharakit	Rajadamnern Stadium	Bangkok, Thailand	Decision	5	3:00
Loses the Rajadamnern Stadium Lightweight (135 lbs) title. Namsak receives the King's Cup.
1961-10-19	Win	(Thailand) Apidej Sit-Hirun	Rajadamnern Stadium	Bangkok, Thailand	KO (Knees)	4	
For the Yodmuaythai trophy.
1961-05-11	Win	(Thailand) Sompong Jaroenmuang	Rajadamnern Stadium	Bangkok, Thailand	KO (Head Kick)	2	
Defends the Rajadamnern Stadium Lightweight (135 lbs) title.
1960-12-16	Win	(Thailand) Danchai Yontharakit	Lumpinee Stadium	Bangkok, Thailand	Decision	5	3:00
Wins the vacant Lumpinee Stadium Lightweight (135 lbs) title.
1960-04-29	Win	(Thailand) Nimit Luatmuangtai		Bangkok, Thailand	Decision	5	3:00
1960-03-01	Loss	(Thailand) Danchai Yontharakit	Lumpinee Stadium	Bangkok, Thailand	Decision	5	3:00
1960	Win	(Thailand) Adisak Kwangmeechai	Rajadamnern Stadium	Bangkok, Thailand	Decision	5	3:00
Wins the Rajadamnern Stadium Lightweight (135 lbs) title.
1959-05-15	Win	(Thailand) Kiewwan Yontharakit	Lumpinee Stadium	Bangkok, Thailand	Decision	5	3:00
1959	Win	(Thailand) Isarasak Panthainorasing	Lumpinee Stadium	Bangkok, Thailand			
Wins the Lumpinee Stadium Featherweight (126 lbs) title.
1958	Win	(Thailand) Adisak Kwangmeechai	Rajadamnern Stadium	Bangkok, Thailand	Decision	5	3:00
For the "King of the Land" title (126 lbs)
1958	Win	(Thailand) Kirisak Barbos	Rajadamnern Stadium	Bangkok, Thailand	Decision	5	3:00
For the "Lord of the Land" title (126 lbs). Adul receives a diamond-embedded pin as the prize.
1958	Loss	(Thailand) Ponchai Sor.Thayang	Rajadamnern Stadium	Bangkok, Thailand	Decision	5	3:00
1958	Win	(Thailand) Sangob Rongpanu	Rajadamnern Stadium	Bangkok, Thailand	Decision	5	3:00
For the "Golden Glove" title (112 lbs)
1957-12-20	Win	(Thailand) Lao Lerdrit	Sor.Tor.Ror Tha Chang	Thailand	Decision	5	3:00
1957	Win	(Thailand) Lao Lerdrit		Chachoengsao, Thailand	Decision	5	3:00
1957	Win	(Thailand) Kiatkong Laemfahpa		Chachoengsao, Thailand	Decision	5	3:00
1957	Loss	(Thailand) Witthaya Ratchawat	Rajadamnern Stadium	Bangkok, Thailand	KO	1	
1957	Draw	(Thailand) Witthaya Ratchawat	Rajadamnern Stadium	Bangkok, Thailand	Decision	5	3:00
1957	Win	(Thailand) Rungsak Ror.Sor.Por		Khorat, Thailand	KO	2	
1957-06-22	Loss	(Thailand) Ponchai Rattanasit	Lumpinee Stadium	Bangkok, Thailand	KO	1	
For the Lumpinee Stadium Flyweight (112 lbs) title.
1957	Win	(Thailand) Saknoi Jaroenmuang	Rajadamnern Stadium	Bangkok, Thailand	Decision	5	3:00
1957	Win	(Thailand) Sanbhap Mahasarakham	Lumpinee Stadium	Bangkok, Thailand	KO	4	
1957	Win	(Thailand) Saknoi Taksinmaharat		Rayong, Thailand	Decision	5	3:00
1957	Win	(Thailand) Sittichai Prasarthinpimai	Rajadamnern Stadium	Bangkok, Thailand	Decision	5	3:00
1957	Win	(Thailand) Yuenyong Luksurin	Rajadamnern Stadium	Bangkok, Thailand	Decision	5	3:00
1957	Win	(Thailand) Buakaw Yontharakit		Chachoengsao, Thailand	KO		
1957	Win	(Thailand) Thanusamut Yodthongchai		Chonburi, Thailand	KO	3	
1957	Win	(Thailand) Surapon Yontharakit		Chachoengsao, Thailand	KO	2	
1957	Win	(Thailand) Chansak Suksawat		Chachoengsao, Thailand	KO	3	
1957	Win	(Thailand) Daomai Kwangmeechai	Rajadamnern Stadium	Bangkok, Thailand	KO	2	
1957	Win	(Thailand) Suradai Lukhanong	Lumpinee Stadium	Bangkok, Thailand	KO	1	
Legend: Win Loss Draw/No contest Notes
