= Monika Chochlíková =

Slovak professional Muay Thai fighter and kickboxer

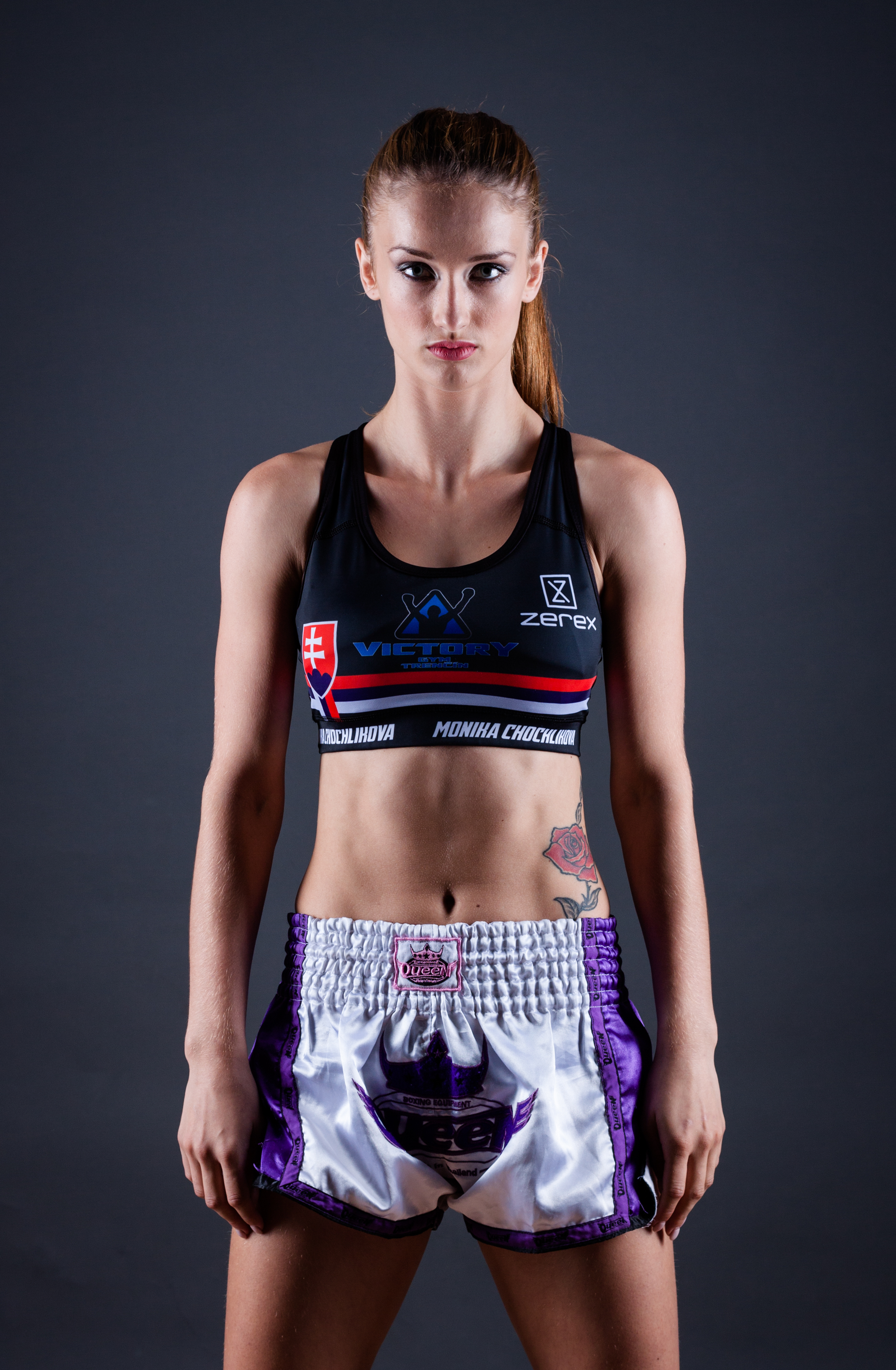
- Born: 13 January 1996 (age 30); Slovakia
- Height: 170 cm (5 ft 7 in)
- Division: 50–52 kg
- Style: Muay Thai
- Stance: Orthodox
- Fighting out of: Trenčín, Slovakia
- Team: Victory Gym Trenčín
- Trainer: Tomáš Tadlánek
- Years active: 2013–present

Kickboxing record
- Total: 34
- Wins: 30
- Losses: 4

Mixed martial arts record
- Total: 4
- Wins: 3
- By submission: 1
- By decision: 2
- Losses: 1
- By decision: 1

Monika Chochlíková (born 13 January 1996) is a Slovak professional Muay Thai fighter, kickboxer and mixed martial artist. She won a gold medal in the WAKO world championships in 2019, and is the first Slovak fighter ever to win the WAKO European championships and IFMA European championships. In 2021 she won the WMC World Muaythai Title, the first female Slovak fighter to do so; she also won gold at the I.F.M.A. World Championship after four wins in the Female Elite -51 kg category, the first Slovak fighter ever to do so. In 2022 she won as first Muaythai fighter in The World Games IFMA after 3 winning fights.

== Kickboxing and Muay Thai ==
Chochlíková started learning karate when she was six years old, and began practicing Muay Thai ten years later.

In 2016, Chochlíková was nominated for the first time to Slovakia's national kickboxing team to attend the European Championship WAKO in K1 in Maribor, Slovenia. She won the gold medal after three wins and became the first Slovak K1 fighter who won gold at a European championship.

In 2017, Chochlíková attended the World Games in Kraków and won the silver medal in the K1 discipline; for non-Olympic Slovakia sports, this was the best achievement at the competition.

In 2018, Chochlíková represented the national Slovak Muay Thai team as a draftee at the European Championship IFMA in Prague. After winning three rounds of fights, she became the European Muay Thai Champion IFMA as well as the first Slovak Muay Thai fighter. She was also awarded the "Rising Female Star" by the International Federation of Muay Thai Associations. Later that year, Chochlíková defended her gold medal at the European Championship WAKO in K1 in Bratislava.

In 2019, Chochlíková became World Champion K1 WAKO after 4 wins.

In 2020, Chochlíková became a professional soldier under Army Sports Center Banská Bystrica.

In 2021, Chochlíková beat in 5.round by TKO Turkish champion Funda Alkayis and became WMC World Champion in Muaythai in 51 kg.

In December 2021 after 4 wins Chochlíkova won gold on IFMA Muaythai World Championship in Bangkok in ELITE Female division -51 kg as first Slovak fighter ever.

In July 2022 Chochlíková was fighting on The World Games where she won Muaythai IFMA tournament and win gold after 3 wins for Slovakia. It was gold medal after 13 years on The World Games for Slovakia and became most successful sportsman of this country on this event.

In December 2023 she was put in the TOP 10 Female Muaythai fighter P4P according WMO - World Muaythai Organisation and became number 1 in Rajadamnern female bantamweight ranking.

== Mixed martial arts career ==
On October 1, 2020, Chochlíková made her professional MMA debut in Bellator MMA as the first female fighter from Slovakia. She defeated Jade Jorand via the unorthodox "scorpion crunch" submission in the second round.

Chochlíková faced Giulia Chinello at OKTAGON 25 on June 19, 2021. She won the fight by unanimous decision.

Chochlíková faced Alessandra Pajuelo at OKTAGON 32 on April 8, 2022. She won the fight by unanimous decision.

Chochlíková faced Sonia Dinh at PML 9 on April 13, 2024. She won the fight by unanimous decision.

== Championships and accomplishments ==
=== Professional ===
- World Muaythai Council
  - 2021 – WMC World Flyweight (51 kg) Champion
    - One successful title defense
  - 2023 – WMC Intercontinental Bantamweight (54 kg) Champion
  - 2025 – WMC World Bantamweight (54 kg) Champion
    - One successful title defense

=== Amateur ===
- World Association of Kickboxing Organizations
  - 2016 – W.A.K.O. European Championship in Maribor, Slovenia 1.place🥇–52 kg (K1)
  - 2017 – W.A.K.O. World Cup in Innsbruck, Austria 1.place🥇–52 kg (K1)
  - 2017 – W.A.K.O. World Cup in Rimini, Italy 1.place🥇–52 kg (K1)
  - 2017 – W.A.K.O. European Cup in Prague, the Czech Republic 1.place🥇–52 kg (K1)
  - 2018 – W.A.K.O. European Championship in Bratislava, Slovakia 1.place🥇–52 kg (K1)
  - 2019 – W.A.K.O. World Championships in Sarajevo, Bosnia and Herzegovina 1.place🥇–52 kg (K1)
  - 2021 – W.A.K.O. World Championships in Lido Di Jesolo, Italy 2.place🥈–52 kg (K1)
- International Federation of Muaythai Associations
  - 2018 – I.F.M.A. European Championships in Prague, the Czech Republic 1.place🥇–51 kg
  - 2019 – I.F.M.A. World Championships in Bangkok, Thailand 3.place🥉–51 kg
  - 2021 – I.F.M.A World Championships in Bangkok, Thailand 1.place🥇–51 kg
  - 2026 – I.F.M.A World Championships in Deçan, Kosovo 2.place🥈–57 kg
- The World Games
  - 2017 – The World Games 2017 K1 –52 kg 🥈
  - 2022 – I.F.M.A The World Games Muay Thai –51 kg 🥇
  - 2025 - World Games Muay Thai –54 kg 🥇
- World Combat Games
  - 2019 – EUSA Combat Games K-1 –56 kg 🥇
  - 2023 – I.F.M.A World Combat Games Muay Thai –51 kg 🥇

=== Awards ===
- 3x Best Female Fighter of Slovak Kickboxing Union (2017, 2018, 2020)
- 5x Best Non Olympic Sportsman of Ministry of Defence Slovakia (MT, K1) (2019, 2020, 2021, 2022, 2023)
- 2017 2.place as Best Non-Olympic Sportsman of Slovakia (K1)
- 2x – Best Female fighter of Slovakia by website svetmma.sk (2017, 2018)
- 2018 – Rising Female Star of I.F.M.A European Championship in Prague
- 4x Best Female Fighter of Slovak Muaythai Association (2019, 2021, 2022, 2023)
- 2022 – The World Games Athlete of the Year 2022 first runner-up
- 2023 2.place as Best Non-Olympic Sportsman of Slovakia (Muaythai)
- 2023 TOP 10 ranking P4P best female Muaythai fighters by WMO (World Muaythai Organisation)
- 2023 Number 1 in Rajadamnern stadium ranking in bantamweight (118lbs)

== Mixed martial arts record ==
Professional record breakdown
4 matches	3 wins	1 loss
By knockout	0	0
By submission	1	0
By decision	2	1

Res.	Record	Opponent	Method	Event	Date	Round	Time	Location	Notes
Loss	3–1	Katharina Dalisda	Decision (unanimous)	OKTAGON 37	December 3, 2022	3	5:00	Ostrava, Czech Republic	
Win	3–0	Alessandra Pajuelo	Decision (unanimous)	OKTAGON 32	April 8, 2022	3	5:00	Ostrava, Czech Republic	
Win	2–0	Giulia Chinello	Decision (unanimous)	OKTAGON 25	June 19, 2021	3	5:00	Brno, Czech Republic	Strawweight debut.
Win	1–0	Jade Jorand	Submission (scorpion crunch)	Bellator 247	October 1, 2020	2	3:50	Milan, Italy	Atomweight debut.

== Muay Thai & Kickboxing record ==
Professional Kickboxing and Muay Thai record
30 Wins, 4 Losses
Date	Result	Opponent	Event	Location	Method	Round	Time
2026-11-28		(France) Valentine Dugerdil	PML 22	Trenčín, Slovakia			
2026-05-09	Win	(Thailand) Looknam Kor. Khomkleaw	PML 20	Trenčín, Slovakia	Decision (Unanimous)	5	3:00
Defends the WMC World Bantamweight (-54kg) title.
2025-10-04	Win	(Spain) Atenea Flores	Oktagon 77	Bratislava, Slovakia	Decision (Unanimous)	3	3:00
2025-05-03	Win	(Turkey) Funda Alkayış	PML 15	Žilina, Slovakia	Decision (Unanimous)	3	3:00
2025-03-29	Win	(Thailand) Somratsamee Manopgym	PML 14	Trenčín, Slovakia	Decision (Unanimous)	5	3:00
Wins the vacant WMC World Bantamweight (-54kg) title.
2024-09-21	Win	(Thailand) Nong Ann Suannamtarkeeree	Rajadamnern World Series, Rajadamnern Stadium	Bangkok, Thailand	Decision (Unanimous)	3	2:00
2024-04-13	Win	(Switzerland) Sonia Dinh	PML 9	Trenčín, Slovakia	Decision (Unanimous)	5	3:00
2024-03-09	Loss	(Thailand) Somratsamee Manopgym	Rajadamnern World Series	Bangkok, Thailand	Decision (Unanimous)	5	2:00
For the Rajadamnern Stadium Bantamweight (118 lbs) title.
2023-12-22	Win	(Thailand) Ngaoprajan Looksaikongdin	Amazing Muay Thai: Road to Rajadamnern / MT Rules, Rajadamnern Stadium	Bangkok, Thailand	Decision	5	
Wins the WMC Intercontinental -54kg title.
2023-09-23	Win	(Italy) Magdalena Pircher	PML 7: Road to Rajadamnern / MT Rules	Trenčín, Slovakia	KO (High kick)	1	
Defends the WMC World -51kg title.
2023-08-05	Win	(Thailand) Karaked Por.Muangpetch	Rajadamnern World Series / MT Rules	Bangkok, Thailand	TKO (Doctor stoppage)	3	
2023-05-20	Win	(United States) Daniel Looknhongsaeng	Rajadamnern World Series / MT Rules	Bangkok, Thailand	Decision (Unanimous)	3	3:00
2023-01-21	Win	(Turkey) Tuğbanur Kıvrak	PML 6: Homecoming / MT Rules	Trenčín, Czech	TKO (Knees)	2	0:56
2022-06-11	Win	(France) Juliette Lacroix	PML 3: The First Champion / MT Rules	Brno, Czech	Decision	3	3:00
2022-01-29	Win	(Switzerland) Aline Seiberth	PML 1: New Beginning / MT Rules	Trenčín, Slovakia	Decision	3	3:00
2021-08-07	Win	(Turkey) Funda Alkayis	MTE 11 / MT Rules	Trenčín, Slovakia	TKO	5	
Wins WMC World -51kg title.
2021-07-11	Win	(Czech Republic) Klára Strnadová	DFN 4 Superfight / MT Rules	Banská Bystrica, Slovakia	Decision	3	3:00
2020-06-20	Win	(Czech Republic) Viktória Bulínová	Oktagon Underground Superfight / MT Rules	Bratislava, Slovakia	Decision	3	3:00
2019-04-28	Loss	(France) Aurore Dos Santos	Enfusion Slovakia / K1 Rules	Žilina, Slovakia	Decision (Split)	5	2:00
For the Enfusion World -52kg title.
2019-02-09	Win	(Ukraine) Maryna Taran	Muay Thai Evening X / MT Rules	Trenčín, Slovakia	Decision	3	3:00
2018-12-01	Win	(Poland) Sylvia Juskiewicz	Enfusion #75 / K1 Rules	Třinec, Czech	Decision	3	3:00
2018-09-01	Win	(Germany) Hiba Hosni	Muay Thai Evening 9 / MT Rules	Trenčín, Slovakia	Decision	3	3:00
2017-12-19	Loss	(France) Myriame Djedidi	Golden Fight 2017	Levallois-Perret, France	Decision (Unanimous)	3	3:00
For the 2017 Golden Fight Tournament Championship (115 lbs).
2017-12-09	Win	(Greece) Fani Peloumpi	Golden Fight 2017	Levallois-Perret, France	Decision (Unanimous)	3	3:00
Legend: Win Loss Draw/No contest Notes

Amateur Kickboxing and Muay Thai record
Date	Result	Opponent	Event	Location	Method	Round	Time
2026-09-10	Loss	(Finland) Miina Sirkeoja	IFMA 2026 World Championships, Final	Deçan, Kosovo	Walk Over		
Wins 2026 IFMA World Championships -57kg Silver Medal.
2026-09-08	Win	(Germany) Lisa Symannek	IFMA 2026 World Championships, Semifinals	Deçan, Kosovo	Decision (30:25)	3	3:00
2025-08-10	Win	(Hungary) Anna Székely	2025 World Games, Bronze Medal fight	Chengdu, China	Decision (29:28)	3	3:00
Wins the 2025 World Games Muay Thai −54kg Bronze Medal.
2025-08-09	Loss	(Mexico) Laura Burgos	2025 World Games, Semifinals	Chengdu, China	Decision (30:27)	3	3:00
2025-08-08	Win	(United States) Megan Washam	2025 World Games, Quarterfinal	Chengdu, China	Decision (29:28)	3	3:00
2024-06-06	Loss	(Mexico) Laura Burgos	IFMA 2024 World Championships, Quarterfinals	Patras, Greece	Decision (30:27)	3	3:00
2024-06-03	Win	(France) Nadia Slimani	IFMA 2024 World Championships, First Round	Patras, Greece	Decision (30:27)	3	3:00
2023-10-30	Win	(Austria) Rebecca Hodl	2023 World Combat Games, Grand Final	Riyadh, Saudi Arabia	Decision	3	3:00
Wins The 2023 World Combat Games Muay Thai −51kg Gold Medal.
2023-10-29	Win	(Spain) Desiree Ramirez	2023 World Combat Games, Winner bracket Semifinals	Riyadh, Saudi Arabia	RSC	1	
2023-10-28	Win	(Austria) Rebecca Hodl	2023 World Combat Games, Quarterfinals	Riyadh, Saudi Arabia	RSC	3	
2023-06-25	Loss	(Turkey) Gulistan Turan	European Games IFMA 51 kg - Quarterfinal	Kraków, Poland	Decision	3	3:00
2022-07-17	Win	(Morocco) Meriem El-Moubarik	The World Games IFMA 51 kg - Final	Birmingham, USA	Decision	3	3:00
Wins IFMA Muay Thai at the World Games 2022 -51kg Gold Medal.
2022-07-16	Win	(Austria) Rebeca Hodl	The World Games IFMA 51 kg - 1/2 Final	Birmingham, USA	Decision	3	3:00
2022-07-15	Win	(United States) Angela Bahr	The World Games IFMA 51 kg - 1/4 Final	Birmingham, USA	Decision	3	3:00
2022-07-13	Loss	(Czech Republic) Klára Strnadová	The World Games Kickboxing 52 kg - 1/4 Final	Birmingham, USA	Decision	3	3:00
2021-12-12	Win	(Turkey) Yaren Kan	I.F.M.A. World Championship 51 kg – Final	Bangkok, Thailand	Decision	3	3:00
Wins 2021 IFMA World Championships -51kg Gold Medal.
2021-12-11	Win	(Thailand) Wansawang Srila Oo	I.F.M.A. World Championship 51 kg – 1/2 Final	Bangkok, Thailand	Decision	3	3:00
2019-12-09	Win	(Russia) Galina Degtiareva	I.F.M.A. World Championship 51 kg – 1/4 Final	Bangkok, Thailand	Decision	3	3:00
2019-11-09	Win	(Sweden) Johanna Persson	I.F.M.A. World Championship 51 kg – 1/8 Final	Bangkok, Thailand	Decision	3	3:00
2021-10-24	Loss	(Mexico) Melissa Lisset Martinez	W.A.K.O World Championship K1 52 kg Final	Jesolo, Italy	Decision	3	2:00
Wins WAKO World Championships K-1 -52kg Silver Medal.
2021-10-23	Win	(Canada) Stephnie Goode	W.A.K.O World Championship K1 52 kg 1/2	Jesolo, Italy	Decision	3	2:00
2021-10-22	Win	(Ukraine) Daryna Ivanova	W.A.K.O World Championship K1 52 kg 1/4	Jesolo, Italy	Decision	3	2:00
2021-10-21	Win	(Russia) Polina Petukhova	W.A.K.O World Championship K1 52 kg 1/8	Jesolo, Italy	Decision	3	2:00
2020-01-25	Win	(Slovakia) Lenka Semethová	National Muaythai Championship 57 kg Final	Banská Bystrica, Slovakia	Decision	3	3:00
2020-01-25	Win	(Slovakia) Adriana Vrbová	National Muaythai Championship 57 kg – 1/2 Final	Banská Bystrica, Slovakia	Decision	3	2:00
2019-10-26	Win	(Brazil) Mariana Nunes	W.A.K.O World Championship K1 52 kg – Final	Sarajevo, Bosnia and Herzegovina	Decision	3	2:00
Wins WAKO World Championships -52kg Gold Medal.
2019-10-25	Win	(Serbia) Stasa Veic	W.A.K.O World Championship K1 52 kg – 1/2 Final	Sarajevo, Bosnia and Herzegovina	Decision	3	2:00
2019-10-24	Win	(Greece) Xantippi Raftopoulou	W.A.K.O World Championship K1 52 kg – 1/4 Final	Sarajevo, Bosnia and Herzegovina	KO	2	0:44
2019-10-22	Win	(Romania) Monica Balasoui	W.A.K.O World Championship K1 52 kg – 1/8 Final	Sarajevo, Bosnia and Herzegovina	Decision	3	2:00
2019-08-03	Win	(Poland) Ewa Pietrzykowska	EUSA Combat Games W.A.K.O. K1 56 kg – Final	Zagreb, Croatia	Decision	3	2:00
Wins 2019 Combat Games WAKO K-1 -56kg Gold Medal.
2019-08-02	Win	(Poland) Paulina Saczuk	EUSA Combat Games W.A.K.O. K1 56 kg – 1/2 Final	Zagreb, Croatia	Decision	3	2:00
2019-08-01	Win	(Ukraine) Antonina Osetska	EUSA Combat Games W.A.K.O. K1 56 kg – 1/4 Final	Zagreb, Croatia	Decision	3	2:00
2019-07-27	Loss	(Vietnam) Bui Yen Ly	I.F.M.A. World Championship 51 kg – 1/2 Final	Bangkok, Thailand	Decision	3	3:00
Wins 2019 IFMA World Championships -51kg Bronze Medal.
2019-07-26	Win	(Ukraine) Anastasia Kulinich	I.F.M.A. World Championship 51 kg – 1/4 Final	Bangkok, Thailand	Decision	3	3:00
2019-07-22	Win	(Hong Kong) Hoi Ling Kwok	I.F.M.A. World Championship 51 kg – 1/8 Final	Bangkok, Thailand	Decision	3	3:00
2019-02-23	Win	(Slovakia) Adriana Vrbová	National Muaythai Championship 54 kg – Final	Trenčín, Slovakia	Decision	3	3:00
2018-10-19	Win	(Czech Republic) Michaela Kerlehová	WAKO European Championship K1 52 kg - Final	Bratislava, Slovakia	Decision	3	2:00
Wins 2018 WAKO European Championships -52kg Gold Medal.
2018-10-17	Win	(Serbia) Marina Djekič	WAKO European Championship K1 52 kg - 1/2 Final	Bratislava, Slovakia	Decision	3	2:00
2018-10-16	Win	(Turkey) Sibel Karabulut	WAKO European Championship K1 52 kg - 1/4 Final	Bratislava, Slovakia	Decision	3	2:00
2018-07-07	Win	(France) Juliette Lacroix	I.F.M.A. European Championship 51 kg - Final	Prague, Czech Republic	Decision	3	3:00
Wins 2018 IFMA European Championships -51kg Gold Medal.
2018-07-05	Win	(Russia) Galina Degtiareva	I.F.M.A. European Championship 51 kg - 1/2 Final	Prague, Czech Republic	Decision	3	3:00
2018-07-01	Win	(Ukraine) Valentyna Sentiurina	I.F.M.A. European Championship 51 kg - 1/4 Final	Prague, Czech Republic	Decision	3	3:00
2017-11-04	Loss	(France) Myriame Djedidi	2017 WAKO World Championships, 1/4 Final	Budapest, Hungary	Decision	3	2:00
2017-07-28	Loss	(Russia) Anna Poskrebysheva	2017 IWGA World Games, Final	Wrocław, Poland	Decision	3	2:00
Wins 2017 IWGA World Games K-1 -52kg Silver Medal.
2017-07-27	Win	(Tunisia) Elghoul Ahlam	2017 IWGA World Games, 1/2 Final	Wrocław, Poland	Decision	3	2:00
2017-07-26	Win	(United States) Ashley Acord	2017 IWGA World Games, 1/4 Final	Wrocław, Poland	Decision	3	2:00
2016-10-	Win	(Austria) Myra Winkelman	2016 WAKO Senior European Championships, Final	Maribor, Slovenia	Decision (3:0)	3	2:00
Wins 2016 WAKO European Championships K-1 -52kg Gold Medal.
2016-10-	Win	(Russia) Anna Poskyrebysheva	2016 WAKO Senior European Championships, Semi Final	Maribor, Slovenia	Decision (2:1)	3	2:00
2016-10-	Win	(Finland) Hanna Raatesalmi	2016 WAKO Senior European Championships, 1/4 Final	Maribor, Slovenia	Decision (3:0)	3	2:00
Legend: Win Loss Draw/No contest Notes

== Karate Combat record ==
Professional record breakdown
2 matches	1 win	1 loss
By decision	1	1

Res.	Record	Opponent	Method	Event	Date	Round	Time	Location	Notes
Loss	1–1	Lili Ferreira	Decision (unanimous)	Karate Combat 59	2026-02-13	5	3:00	Miami, Florida, USA	For the Interim Women's Strawweight title.
Win	1–0	Janaina Silva	Decision (unanimous)	Karate Combat 57	2025-10-31	3	3:00	Miami, Florida, USA	

== See also ==
- List of female kickboxers
- List of female mixed martial artists
