= Kongdej Lukbangplasoi =

Thai professional Muay Thai fighter

Kongdej Lookbangplasoi
- Born: Somdej Katanyu; November 1949; Tha Mai district, Chanthaburi province, Thailand
- Died: 2004
- Native name: สมเดช กตัญญู
- Other names: Khongdej Sor Boonpitak (คงเดช ส.บุญพิทักษ์); Kongdet lookbangplasroy
- Nickname: Black Shark (ฉลามร้าย); Black Shark from the Eastern Sea (ฉลามร้ายจากฝั่งทะเลตะวันออก)
- Height: 172 cm (5 ft 8 in)
- Division: Lightweight; Super Lightweight; Welterweight; Middleweight
- Style: Muay Thai
- Stance: Southpaw

Somdej Katanyu (Thai: สมเดช กตัญญู), known professionally as Kongdej Lookbangplasoi (Thai: คงเดช ลูกบางปลาสร้อย), was a Thai professional Muay Thai fighter.

== Biography and career ==
Somdej Katanyu started training in Muay Thai at the age of 14 with his father, a police lieutenant. He won 24 of his first 25 fights in the Chanthaburi province and other neighbouring provinces. He moved to Charan Sangchamrat's camp in 1965 and changed his ring name to Kongdej Lukbangplasoi as he made his Bangkok debut, defeating Narongsuek Sor Suanmali at the Lumpinee Stadium.

In 1968 Kongdej had what is considered one of the most successful year in Muay Thai history, defeating notable champions Payap Sakulsuk, Rawee Dechachai, Apidej Sit-Hirun and Dejrit Ithianuchit. He also became the inaugural Rajadamnern Stadium Super Lightweight Champion when he knocked out Phonsak Laemfapha.

Kongdej later faced other champions such as Saensak Muangsurin, Poot Lorlek, Sirimongkol Luksiripat and captured the Channel 7 TV Middleweight title.

== Championships and awards ==
- Rajadamnern Stadium
  - 1968 Rajadamnern Stadium Super Lightweight (140 lbs) Champion
- Channel 7
  - 1974 Channel 7 TV Middleweight (160 lbs) Champion

== Muay Thai record ==
Muay Thai Record
64 Wins (38 (T)KOs), 22 Losses
Date	Result	Opponent	Event	Location	Method	Round	Time
1981-	Loss	(Thailand) Lertdej Kiatsunthorn		Chanthaburi province, Thailand	Decision	5	3:00
1977-02-11	Loss	(Thailand) Poot Lorlek	Lumpinee Stadium	Bangkok, Thailand	Decision	5	3:00
1975-01-07	Loss	(Thailand) Phichit Singchuepleng	Yod Muay Thai, Lumpinee Stadium	Bangkok, Thailand	Decision	5	3:00
1974-11-17	Win	(Thailand) Katanyuchai Kwanjaichonnabot	Channel 7, Huamark Stadium	Bangkok, Thailand	Decision	5	3:00
Wins the Channel 7 Middleweight (160 lbs) Championship.
1974-07-02	Loss	(Thailand) Sirimongkol Luksiripat		Bangkok, Thailand	Decision	5	3:00
1974-05-31	Loss	(Thailand) Poot Lorlek	Lumpinee Stadium	Bangkok, Thailand	Decision	5	3:00
1974-03-26	Win	(Thailand) Buriram Suanmisakawan	Mathupum, Lumpinee Stadium	Bangkok, Thailand	Decision	5	3:00
1973-08-15	Loss	(Thailand) Saensak Muangsurin	Yodtawan, Rajadamnern Stadium	Bangkok, Thailand	KO (Punches)	1	
1973-06-06	Loss	(Thailand) Sirimongkol Luksiripat	Lumpinee Stadium	Bangkok, Thailand	Decision	5	3:00
1972-05-31	Loss	(Thailand) Sichang Sakonphithak	Chatawanook, Rajadamnern Stadium	Bangkok, Thailand	Ref. stop (Kongdej dismissed)		
1972-03-17	Win	(Thailand) Sornakrob Kiatwayupak	Lumpinee Stadium	Bangkok, Thailand	KO	5	
1971-10-29	Loss	(Thailand) Sichang Sakonphithak	Yod Muay Thai 14, Lumpinee Stadium	Bangkok, Thailand	Decision	5	3:00
1971-05-11	Win	(Thailand) Huasai Sithiboonlert	Kiatsayam, Lumpinee Stadium	Bangkok, Thailand	Decision	5	3:00
1971-04-02	Loss	(Thailand) Huasai Sithiboonlert	Huamark Stadium	Bangkok, Thailand	Decision	5	3:00
	Win	(Thailand) Monsawan Laemphapha		Bangkok, Thailand	KO (Low kick)	1	
1970-03-20	Win	(Thailand) Apidej Sit-Hirun	Chartchai Chionoi vs Efren Torres, Huamark Stadium	Bangkok, Thailand	Decision	5	3:00
1969-11-21	Win	(Thailand) Dejrit Ithianuchit	Yodkhunsuk, Lumpinee Stadium	Bangkok, Thailand	Decision	5	3:00
1969-10-03	Win	(Thailand) Apidej Sit-Hirun	Huamark Stadium	Bangkok, Thailand	KO (Low kicks)	2	
1969-07-04	Loss	(Thailand) Apidej Sit-Hirun	Yod Muay Siam, Lumpinee Stadium	Bangkok, Thailand	Decision	5	3:00
1969-04-08	Win	(Thailand) Dejrit Ithianuchit		Bangkok, Thailand	Decision	5	3:00
1968-12-09	Win	(Thailand) Apidej Sit-Hirun	Chalamsua, Rajadamnern Stadium	Bangkok, Thailand	KO (Elbow)	2	
1968-	Win	(Thailand) Prabsuk Sirikorn	Rajadamnern Stadium	Bangkok, Thailand	KO	2	
1968-09-02	Win	(Thailand) Rawee Dechachai	Chalamsua, Rajadamnern Stadium	Bangkok, Thailand	KO (Left cross)	2	
1968-07-29	Win	(Thailand) Den Srisothorn	Chalamsuea, Rajadamnern Stadium	Bangkok, Thailand	KO (left hook)	2	
1968-05-18	Win	(Thailand) Phonsak Laemfapha	Rajadamnern Stadium	Bangkok, Thailand	TKO (Doctor stoppage)	4	
Wins the inaugural Rajadamnern Stadium Super Lightweight (140 lbs) Championship.
1968-	Win	(Thailand) Payap Sakulsuk	Rajadamnern Stadium	Bangkok, Thailand	KO	2	
1968-04-03	Win	(Thailand) Sompong Jaroenmuang	Rajadamnern Stadium	Bangkok, Thailand	KO	5	
1968-	Loss	(Thailand) Monsawan Laemphapha		Bangkok, Thailand	KO (Punch)	1	
1968-	Win	(Thailand) Fapetch Singubon	Rajadamnern Stadium	Bangkok, Thailand	KO	4	
1967-06-07	Win	(Thailand) Han Silathong	Thalom Lokan, Rajadamnern Stadium	Bangkok, Thailand	KO	4	
1967-05-17	Loss	(Thailand) Wiradej Sor.Lukpithak	Yodsuk, Rajadamnern Stadium	Bangkok, Thailand	Decision	5	3:00
1967	Win	(Thailand) Phongsing Klongphot		Bangkok, Thailand	KO	1	
1967-01-26	Win	(Thailand) Tabandej Srisothorn	Saiyasana, Rajadamnern Stadium	Bangkok, Thailand	TKO	2	
1966	Loss	(Thailand) Phichitsing Sakonphithak		Bangkok, Thailand	Decision	5	3:00
1966	Loss	(Thailand) Saentanong Kesongkhram		Bangkok, Thailand	Decision	5	3:00
1965-05-	Win	(Thailand) Narongsuek Sor Suanmali	Lumpinee Stadium	Bangkok, Thailand	KO	1	
Legend: Win Loss Draw/No contest Notes
