= Maria Eduarda =

Brazilian professional Muay Thai fighter

- Born: Maria Eduarda Santana; 2002 (age 23–24); Caraguatatuba, Sao Paulo, Brazil
- Other names: Duda Santana; Maria Santana; Queen of Fire; Maria Eduarda Kamnan Chet Muangchon
- Nationality: Brazil
- Height: 163 cm (5 ft 4 in)
- Division: Bantamweight
- Fighting out of: Brazil
- Team: Marcondes Team; Family Muaythai Gym
- Trainer: Wesley Marcondes

Kickboxing record
- Total: 45
- Wins: 33
- Losses: 11
- Draws: 1

Mixed martial arts record
- Total: 4
- Wins: 2
- Losses: 2

Maria Eduarda, also known as Duda Santana, is a Brazilian professional Muay Thai fighter, kickboxer, and mixed martial artist. She is a three-time Brazilian Muay Thai champion and the winner of the LWC Super Champ tournament.

== Career ==
On 24 February 2024, Maria Eduarda defeated her compatriot Day Vieira at the 3M Fight event in Brazil, earning her second championship title within the promotion.

On 16 March 2024, at a joint event organized by AITMA and IMTF in Thailand, Maria Eduarda captured the championship title by scoring a first-round knockout.

On 27 April 2024, in her second appearance at the Rajadamnern World Series, Maria Eduarda scored a second-round TKO victory over England’s Daniela Miranda.

On 15 June 2024, at the EM Legend 46 event held in China, Maria Eduarda defeated China’s Qi Qiulan by decision under kickboxing rules.

In 2024, at the Thai Fight four-woman tournament, Maria Eduarda earned a decision victory over England’s Brunilda Dushku to advance to the final, where she lost by decision to the Thai fighter Fahsai Aor. Yutthachai.

On 5 July 2025, Maria Eduarda competed in the LWC Super Champ eight-woman tournament. She defeated the Thai fighter Pancake Kiattithongyot in the quarterfinals and later that same evening earned a decision win over France’s Justine Desportes in the semifinals, securing her place in the final.

On 16 August 2025, in the tournament final, Maria Eduarda defeated the Thai fighter Karaked by decision over five 2-minute rounds, winning the LWC Super Champ tournament.

On 4 October 2025, Maria Eduarda challenged Brazil’s Bárbara Aguiar for the bantamweight title at Rajadamnern Stadium, losing the bout by split decision. Since Aguiar failed to make the required weight, the title remained vacant following the fight.

== Titles and accomplishments ==
=== Muay Thai ===
- Lumpinee World Championship Super Champ
  - 2025 LWC Super Champ Champion
- Rajadamnern Stadium
  - 2026 #1 Ranked Female Flyweight In Rajadamnern Stadium
  - 2025 #1 Ranked Female Bantamweight In Rajadamnern Stadium
  - 2024 Rajadamnern World Series Runner-up
- Association Institute of Thai Martial Arts & International Muaythai Federation
  - 2024 AITMA & IMTF Champion
- 3M Fight Championship
  - 2024 3M Fight Champion
  - 2023 3M Fight Champion

== Muay Thai and Kickboxing record ==
Professional Muay Thai Record
33 Wins, 11 Losses, 1 Draws
| Date | Result | Opponent | Event | Location | Method | Round | Time |
| 2026-09-26 | Win | (United Kingdom) Leonie Hardman | Rajadamnern World Series | Bangkok, Thailand | KO (Punches) | 1 | 0:33 |
| 2026-05-30 | Win | (Thailand) Narak WKK Gym | Rajadamnern World Series | Bangkok, Thailand | Decision (Unanimous) | 3 | 2:00 |
| 2026-04-04 | Win | (Thailand) Pinpetch Mor.RajabhatKorat | Rajadamnern World Series | Bangkok, Thailand | Decision (Unanimous) | 3 | 2:00 |
| 2026-01-31 | Loss | (Finland) Eeva Pohto | Rajadamnern World Series | Bangkok, Thailand | Decision (Split) | 3 | 2:00 |
| 2025-12-26 | Loss | (Thailand) Somratsamee Manop Muay Thai Gym | Road to Rajadamnern | Bangkok, Thailand | Decision (Split) | 3 | 2:00 |
| 2025-11-15 | Win | (Australia) Joanne La | Road To Rajadamnern x Rebellion | Melbourne, Australia | Decision (Split) | 3 | 3:00 |
| 2025-10-04 | Loss | (Brazil) Bárbara Aguiar | Rajadamnern World Series | Bangkok, Thailand | Decision (Split) | 5 | 2:00 |
The Bantamweight (118 lbs) title remained vacant after Bárbara Aguiar missed weight for her Rajadamnern Stadium title bout.
| 2025-08-16 | Win | (Thailand) Karaked KrueangduemCommandoGym | LWC Super Champ, Final | Bangkok, Thailand | Decision | 5 | 2:00 |
Wins the LWC Super Champ tournament.
| 2025-07-05 | Win | (France) Justine Desportes | LWC Super Champ, Semifinals | Bangkok, Thailand | Decision | 3 | 3:00 |
| 2025-07-05 | Win | (Thailand) Pancake Kiattithongyot | LWC Super Champ, Quarterfinals | Bangkok, Thailand | Decision | 3 | 3:00 |
| 2025-05-10 | Win | (Russia) Zarina Islamova | Rajadamnern World Series | Bangkok, Thailand | Decision (Unanimous) | 3 | 2:00 |
| 2025-02-15 | Loss | (Thailand) Pancake Kiattithongyot | Rajadamnern World Series | Bangkok, Thailand | Decision (Unanimous) | 3 | 2:00 |
| 2024-12-22 | Loss | (Thailand) Fahsai Aor.Yutthachai | THAI FIGHT Phayao (Finals) | Phayao Province, Thailand | Decision | 3 | 2:00 |
| 2024-11-30 | Loss | (China) Zhang Ruohan | Wusheng Tong’an World Kungfu Championship | Xiamen, China | Decision | 3 | 2:00 |
| 2024-11-17 | Win | (England) Brunilda Dushku | SUPER FIGHT KARD CHUEK – THAI FIGHT LEAGUE #56 | Tawanna, Bang Kapi, Thailand | Decision | 3 | 2:00 |
| 2024-11-02 | Loss | (Thailand) Kwanjai KwanjaiMuayThaiGym | Rajadamnern World Series | Bangkok, Thailand | Decision (Unanimous) | 3 | 2:00 |
| 2024-09-28 | Win | (Thailand) Karaked KrueangduemCommandoGym | Rajadamnern World Series | Bangkok, Thailand | TKO | 2 | 0:56 |
| 2024-08-24 | Loss | (Thailand) Somratsamee Manop Muay Thai Gym | Rajadamnern World Series | Bangkok, Thailand | Decision (Unanimous) | 3 | 2:00 |
| 2024-07-13 | Draw | (Thailand) Mayree Khongsittha Muay Thai | Rajadamnern World Series | Bangkok, Thailand | Draw | 3 | 2:00 |
| 2024-06-15 | Win | (China) Qi Qiulan | EM Legend 46 | Chongqing, China | Decision | 3 | 3:00 |
| 2024-05-25 | Win | (Turkey) Sevgi Doğan | Rajadamnern World Series | Bangkok, Thailand | Decision (Unanimous) | 3 | 2:00 |
| 2024-04-27 | Win | (England) Daniela Miranda | Rajadamnern World Series | Bangkok, Thailand | TKO | 2 | 1:14 |
| 2024-03-30 | Loss | (Thailand) Nongnook Mok Chor Chaiyaphum | Rajadamnern World Series | Nakhon Ratchasima Province, Thailand | Decision (Unanimous) | 3 | 2:00 |
| 2024-03-16 | Win | (Thailand) Thitaporn Phetnongthee | AITMA & IMTF World Championships | Ayutthaya, Thailand | KO | 1 | -- |
Wins the AITMA & IMTF Title.
| 2024-02-24 | Win | (Brazil) Day Vieira | 3M Fight #4: Fire | Caraguatatuba, Brazil | - | - | - |
Wins the 3M Fight Championship Title.
| 2023-09-24 | Loss | (Brazil) Bárbara Zompero | War Muay Thai Fight | Brazil | Decision | 3 | 2:00 |
| 2023-05-28 | Win | (Brazil) Wandinha Singha | War Muay Thai Fight | Brazil | Decision | 3 | 2:00 |
| 2023-03-25 | Win | (Brazil) Nawira Ferreira | 3M Fight #1 | Caraguatatuba, Brazil | Decision | - | - |
Wins the 3M Fight Title.
| 2022-07-31 | Win | (Brazil) Lediane Gabrielle | Rei Fight / War Muay Thai Fight | São Paulo, Brazil | Decision | 3 | 3:00 |
| 2022-05-25 | Win | (Brazil) Joelma Águia | Desafio The King TK9 | São Paulo, Brazil | KO | 2 | -- |
| 2022-05-07 | Win | (Brazil) Maiara Fernandes | Arena Fight | Santos, Brazil | TKO | 3 | -- |

== Mixed martial arts record ==
| Result | Record | Opponent | Method | Event | Date | Round | Time | Location | Notes |
|---|---|---|---|---|---|---|---|---|---|
| Loss | 2–2 | (Brazil) Eduarda Moura | Rear Naked Choke | Thunder Fight 39 | 2022-11-24 | 1 | 4:26 | São Paulo, Brazil | |
| Win | 2–1 | (Brazil) Julia Luisa | Rear Naked Choke | Standout Fighting Tournament / SFT Outubro Rosa 5 | 2022-10-29 | 1 | 1:16 | Sao Paulo, Brazil | |
| Win | 1–1 | (Brazil) Jéssica Gomes | Decision (Unanimous) | Demo Fight 14 | 2022-09-24 | 3 | 5:00 | Salvador, Bahia, Brazil | |
| Loss | 0–1 | (Brazil) Dayane Cristine | Decision (Unanimous) | Legacy Fighting Alliance / LFA 136: Rio de Janeiro vs. São Paulo | 2022-07-15 | 3 | 5:00 | Caraguatatuba, Sao Paulo, Brazil | |

== See also ==
- List of female kickboxers
- List of female mixed martial artists
