= Somratsamee Manopgym =

Thai Muay Thai kickboxer (born 2003)

- Born: Somratsamee Chaisuya โสมรัศมี ไชยสุยะ; 16 August 2003 (age 23); Hot district, Chiang Mai Province, Thailand
- Other names: Somratsamee Sor.Sor.Chiangmai (โสมรัศมี ศส.เชียงใหม่); Somratsamee MuaythaiPlaza2004; Somratsamee Sor.Wanrawee (โสม รัศมี ส.วันระวี); Somratsamee MuaythaiThapae (โสมรัศมี มวยหญิงท่าแพ); Phueng ผึ้ง
- Height: 169 cm (5 ft 7 in)
- Weight: 53 kg (117 lb; 8 st)
- Stance: Southpaw
- Fighting out of: Chiang Mai, Thailand
- Team: Manop Gym
- Trainer: Ajarn Narong Faktang; Kru Manop

Other information
- University: Thailand National Sports University

Somratsamee Manopgym (โสมรัศมี มานพยิม) is a Thai professional Muay Thai fighter. She is the first woman to ever win a Rajadamnern Stadium title.

== Biography and career ==
Somratsmaee was born in the Chiang Mai province and is part of the Pga K'nyau tribe. She started to compete in Muay Thai at the age of 12 as a way to make quick money.

In 2022 Somratsamee took part in the newly created Rajadamnern World Series in the 112 lbs division. She reached the final happening on December 23, 2023, where she faced Zehra Doğan. She won the fight by unanimous decision.

In 2023 Somratsamee joined the Rajadamnern World Series again, this time at 118 lbs. She reached the Final 4 on August 26, 2023, where she defeated Kamlaipetch Petchyindee Academy by unanimous decision and qualified for the final. Somratsamee faced Ngaoprajan Looksakongdin in the final on September 30, 2023. She won the fight by unanimous decision to capture her second Rajadamnern World Series title and the 3 million baht cash prize.

On December 23, 2023, Somratsamee faced Sevgi Doğan in the first ever Women's Rajadamnern Stadium title fight. She won the fight by unanimous decision.

As of January 2024, Somratsamee was ranked as one of the 10 best pound-for-pound female muay thai fighter in the world by the WMO.

== Championships and accomplishments ==
- World Muaythai Organization
  - 2019 WMO World Light Flyweight Champion
  - 2023 WMO Female Fighter of the Year
- Rajadamnern Stadium
  - 2022 Rajadamnern World Series Flyweight (112 lbs) Winner
  - 2023 Rajadamnern World Series Bantamweight (118 lbs) Winner
  - 2023 Rajadamnern Stadium Bantamweight (118 lbs) Champion (two defenses)
- International Professional Combat Council
  - 2019 IPCC Muay Thai World Flyweight Champion
- International Federation of Muaythai Associations
  - 2022 IFMA World Championship U-23 -48 kg (silver)

== Muay Thai record ==
Professional Muay Thai record
73 Wins, 11 Losses, 1 Draws
Date	Result	Opponent	Event	Location	Method	Round	Time
2026-08-08	Loss	(Australia) Bryony Soden	YOKKAO 51	Brisbane, Australia	Decision (Unanimous)	5	3:00
For the YOKKAO Female Super Bantamweight World title.
2026-06-27	Draw	(Turkey) Nehir Karaca	Endas Thai Boxe Mania	Rome, Italy	Draw	3	3:00
2026-03-28	Win	(Iran) Fazeh Fali	Rajadamnern World Series	Bangkok, Thailand	Decision (Unanimous)	3	2:00
2025-12-26	Win	(Brazil) Maria Eduarda	Road to Rajadamnern	Bangkok, Thailand	Split Decision	3	2:00
2025-10-25	Win	(Morocco) Sara Chaabouni	Rajadamnern World Series	Bangkok, Thailand	Decision (Unanimous)	3	2:00
2025-03-29	Loss	(Slovakia) Monika Chochlíková	PML 14	Trenčín, Slovakia	Decision (Unanimous)	5	3:00
For the WMC World -54KG title.
2024-11-02	Loss	(Brazil) Bárbara Aguiar	Rajadamnern World Series - Final 4	Bangkok, Thailand	Decision (Unanimous)	3	2:00
2024-09-28	Win	(Thailand) Mayree Khongsitta	Rajadamnern World Series - Group Stage	Bangkok, Thailand	Decision (Unanimous)	3	2:00
2024-08-24	Win	(Brazil) Maria Eduarda	Rajadamnern World Series - Group Stage	Bangkok, Thailand	Decision (Unanimous)	3	2:00
2024-07-13	Win	(Thailand) Karaked Por.Muangphet	Rajadamnern World Series - Group Stage	Bangkok, Thailand	Decision (Unanimous)	3	2:00
2024-06-01	Win	(Thailand) Kamlaipetch Petchyindee Academy	Rajadamnern World Series	Bangkok, Thailand	Decision (Unanimous)	5	2:00
Defends the Rajadamnern Stadium Women's Bantamweight (118 lbs) title.
2024-03-09	Win	(Slovakia) Monika Chochlíková	Rajadamnern World Series	Bangkok, Thailand	Decision (Unanimous)	5	2:00
Defends the Rajadamnern Stadium Women's Bantamweight (118 lbs) title.
2023-12-23	Win	(Turkey) Sevgi Doğan	Rajadamnern World Series	Bangkok, Thailand	Decision (Unanimous)	5	2:00
Wins the inaugural Rajadamnern Stadium Women's Bantamweight (118 lbs) title.
2023-09-30	Win	(Thailand) Ngaoprajan Looksaikongdin	Rajadamnern World Series – Final	Bangkok, Thailand	Decision (Unanimous)	5	2:00
Wins the 2023 Rajadamnern World Series Women Bantamweight (118 lbs) title.
2023-08-26	Win	(Thailand) Kamlaipetch Petchyindee Academy	Rajadamnern World Series – Final 4	Bangkok, Thailand	Decision (Unanimous)	3	2:00
2023-07-22	Win	(United States) Sarah Gohier	Rajadamnern World Series – Group stage	Bangkok, Thailand	Decision (Unanimous)	3	2:00
2023-06-17	Win	(Thailand) Ngaoprajan Looksaikongdin	Rajadamnern World Series – Group stage	Bangkok, Thailand	Decision (Unanimous)	3	2:00
2023-05-13	Win	(Brazil) Gabriele RevolutionPhuket	Rajadamnern World Series – Group stage	Bangkok, Thailand	Decision (Unanimous)	3	2:00
2023-04-15	Win	(Thailand) The Star Sit.Chor	Rajadamnern World Series	Bangkok, Thailand	Decision (Unanimous)	3	2:00
2022-12-23	Win	(Turkey) Zehra Doğan	Rajadamnern World Series – Final	Bangkok, Thailand	Decision (Unanimous)	5	2:00
Wins the 2022 Rajadamnern World Series Women Flyweight (112 lbs) title.
2022-10-21	Win	(Turkey) Zehra Doğan	Rajadamnern World Series – Group stage	Bangkok, Thailand	Decision (Unanimous)	3	2:00
2022-09-16	Win	(Thailand) Petchnamnueng Fairtex	Rajadamnern World Series – Group stage	Bangkok, Thailand	Decision (Unanimous)	3	2:00
2022-08-12	Win	(Spain) Desiree Rovira	Rajadamnern World Series – Group stage	Bangkok, Thailand	Decision (Unanimous)	3	2:00
2022-07-02	Win	(Spain) Paula Silva	Golden League España vs. Tailandia	Barcelona, Spain	Decision	3	3:00
2022-06-13	Win	(Spain) Desiree Rovira	Thapae Stadium	Chiang Mai, Thailand	Decision	5	2:00
Wins the Thapae Stadium title.
2022-04-10	Loss	(England) Lisa Brierley	Muay Thai Super Champ	Bangkok, Thailand	Decision	3	3:00
2022-02-01	Loss	(Thailand) Sanaejan Sor.Jor.Tongprachin	Lumpinee GoSport	Bangkok, Thailand	Decision	5	2:00
2020-10-16	Win	(Estonia) Marie Ruumet	International Muay Thai fight Kor Kiat Thom	Chiang Mai, Thailand	Decision	5	2:00
2020-09-13	Win	(Thailand)		Lampang province, Thailand	Decision	5	2:00
2020-03-09	Win	(Thailand) Nanhong Paewplai	Thapae Stadium	Chiang Mai, Thailand	Decision	5	2:00
2019-12-08	Loss	(Estonia) Marie Ruumet	Muay Thai Super Champ	Bangkok, Thailand	TKO (Knees)	2	2:51
2019-10-23	Loss	(United States) Maggie Wanek	Chiang Mai Stadium	Chiang Mai, Thailand	Decision (Unanimous)	5	2:00
For the Chiang Mai Stadium title.
2019-10-04	Win	(France) Melina FA Group	Muay Thai Lifestyle + Inter Women Fight	Nakhon Ratchasima province, Thailand	Decision (Unanimous)	5	2:00
Wins the vacant WMO World Light Flyweight (108 lbs) title.
2019-08-02	Win	(Greece) Fani Peloumpi	Inter Women Fight	Thailand	Decision (Unanimous)	5	2:00
Wins the IPCC Muay Thai World Flyweight (112 lbs) title.
2019-07-04	Win	(Thailand) Phetdara Sittrakulthao	Thapae Stadium	Chiang Mai, Thailand	Decision	5	2:00
2019-05-30	Win	(Thailand) Gulapdam	Thapae Stadium	Chiang Mai, Thailand	Decision	5	2:00
2019–	Win	(Thailand) Namthip Sor.Anucha	Thapae Stadium	Chiang Mai, Thailand	Decision	5	2:00
Legend: Win Loss Draw/No contest Notes

Amateur Muay Thai record
Date	Result	Opponent	Event	Location	Method	Round	Time
2022-06-03	Loss	(Morocco) Oumaima Belouarrat	IFMA 2023 World Championship, Final	Abu Dhabi, UAE	Decision (30:27)	3	3:00
Wins 2023 World Championship U-23 -48kg Silver Medal.
2022-06-01	Win	(Austria) Kincsö Olah	IFMA 2023 World Championship, Semi-finals	Abu Dhabi, UAE	Decision (30:27)	3	3:00
2022-05-28	Win	(Switzerland) Samira Hodapp	IFMA 2023 World Championship, Quarterfinals	Abu Dhabi, UAE	Walk over		
Legend: Win Loss Draw/No contest Notes
