= Apidej Sit-Hirun =

Thai professional Muay Thai fighter

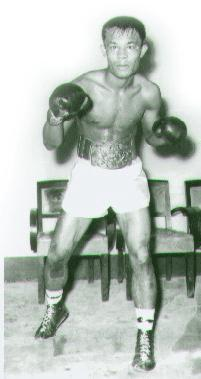
- Apidej Sit-Hirun in the 1970s
- Born: Narong Yaenprateep; September 1941; Samut Songkhram, Thailand
- Died: April 4, 2013 (aged 71); Bangkok, Thailand
- Native name: ณรงค์ ทรงมณี
- Nickname: Kicker from Bang Nok Khwaek (จอมเตะจากบางนกแขวก)
- Height: 175 cm (5 ft 9 in)
- Division: Welterweight
- Style: Muay Thai (Muay Tae); Boxing
- Stance: Orthodox
- Years active: c. 1958-1976

Professional boxing record
- Total: 14
- Wins: 13
- By knockout: 9
- Losses: 1
- By knockout: 2

Kickboxing record
- Total: 98
- Wins: 74
- Losses: 23
- Draws: 1

Other information
- Boxing record from BoxRec

Narong Yaenprateep (Thai: ณรงค์ ทรงมณี; September 1941 – April 4, 2013), known professionally as Apidej Sit-Hirun (Thai: อภิเดช ศิษย์หิรัญ), was a Thai professional Muay Thai fighter and boxer. He was a two-time Lumpinee Stadium Welterweight Champion and two-time Rajadamnern Stadium Welterweight Champion who was famous in the 1960s and 1970s. Nicknamed the "Kicker from Bang Nok Khwaek", he is often regarded as one of the greatest fighters and one of the hardest kickers in Muay Thai history.

== Biography and career ==
=== Early years ===
Born in Samut Songkhram, Thailand, Apidej started Muay Thai in his hometown at the age of 8. After 3 months of training he had his first fight in Ratchaburi competing under the name Apidej Lukpornchai (ครูสุพร วงศาโรจน์), he earned 30 baht.

=== Career ===
In 1957 he became Apidej Sit-Hirun, he was best known for his powerful kicks. In one fight, he broke both of Sompong Charoenmuang's arms, and forced the fighter to retire. He is considered the hardest kicker in muay Thai history. Apidej simultaneously held no less than seven muay Thai and boxing titles for a period during the 1960s. Thereafter, he was acclaimed as a national hero and Muay Thai Fighter of the Century by King Bhumibol Adulyadej. After his retirement, Apidej taught as an instructor at the Fairtex school outside Bangkok, Thailand alongside modern champions such as Yodsanklai Fairtex and Kaew Fairtex.

=== Death ===
Apidej died of lung cancer at the age of 72 on April 4, 2013, at Phramongkutklao Hospital, Bangkok.

== Championships and accomplishments ==
=== Muay Thai ===
- Lumpinee Stadium
  - 1964 Lumpinee Stadium Welterweight (147 lbs) Champion
  - 1967 Lumpinee Stadium Welterweight (147 lbs) Champion
- Rajadamnern Stadium
  - 1962 Rajadamnern Stadium Welterweight (147 lbs) Champion (3 defenses)
  - 1968 Rajadamnern Stadium Welterweight (147 lbs) Champion
- Thailand
  - 1964 Thailand Welterweight (147 lbs) Champion

=== Boxing ===
- Rajadamnern Stadium
  - 1964 Thailand Welterweight (147 lbs) Champion
- Lumpinee Stadium
  - 1964 Thailand Welterweight (147 lbs) Champion
- Oriental and Pacific Boxing Federation
  - 1965 OPBF Welterweight (147 lbs) Champion

== Muay Thai record ==
Muay Thai Record (Incomplete)
74 Wins, 23 Losses, 1 Draw
Date	Result	Opponent	Event	Location	Method	Round	Time
1983-07-10	Loss	(Japan) Yasunori Suda		Hong Kong	KO (Punches)	2	
1978-01-16	Loss	(Thailand) Chalermchai		Ratchaburi province, Thailand	TKO (retirement)		
1977-03-29	Loss	(Thailand) Siangow Sitbangprajan	Lumpinee Stadium	Bangkok, Thailand	Decision	5	3:00
1975-07-11	Win	(Thailand) Changnoi Srirong	Lumpinee Stadium	Bangkok, Thailand	KO	1	
1976-06-05	Loss	(Thailand) Sirimongkol Luksiripat	Lumpinee Stadium	Bangkok, Thailand	TKO (Doctor stoppage)	2	
1975-10-14	Loss	(Thailand) Pudpadnoi Worawut	Lumpinee Stadium	Bangkok, Thailand	Decision	5	3:00
1975-09-15	Win	(Thailand) Buriram Suanmisakawan	Rajadamnern Stadium	Bangkok, Thailand	Decision	5	3:00
1975-04-07	Loss	(Thailand) Satanfah Sor.Prateep	Rajadamnern Stadium	Bangkok, Thailand	Decision	5	3:00
1975-02-03	Loss	(Thailand) Khunpon Sakornpitak	Rajadamnern Stadium	Bangkok, Thailand	Decision	5	3:00
1974-	Win	(Thailand) Nuaphet Sakornpitak		Bangkok, Thailand	Decision	5	3:00
1971-02-08	Win	(Thailand) Yodthong Sahaisuk		Bangkok, Thailand	Decision	5	3:00
1970-11-26	Win	(Thailand) Narong Pitsanurachan	Rajadamnern Stadium	Bangkok, Thailand	Decision	5	3:00
1970-07-04	Loss	(Thailand) Huasai Sitiboonlert	Lumpinee Stadium	Bangkok, Thailand	KO	1	
1970-05-29	Win	(Thailand) Dejrit Itthianuchit	Lumpinee Stadium	Bangkok, Thailand	Decision	5	3:00
1970-03-20	Loss	(Thailand) Kongdej Lukbangplasoi	Chartchai Chionoi vs Efren Torres, Huamark Stadium	Bangkok, Thailand	Decision	5	3:00
1970-02-05	Win	(Thailand) Huasai Sitiboonlert	Lumpinee Stadium	Bangkok, Thailand	KO (Punch)	3	
1969-10-03	Loss	(Thailand) Kongdej Lukbangplasoi	Huamark Stadium	Bangkok, Thailand	KO (Low kicks)	2	
1969-08-12	Win	(Thailand) Phananan Lukmuangprae	Lumpinee Stadium	Bangkok, Thailand	Decision	5	3:00
1969-07-04	Win	(Thailand) Kongdej Lukbangplasoi	Lumpinee Stadium	Bangkok, Thailand	Decision	5	3:00
Receives the Yodmuaythai trophy.
1968-12-09	Loss	(Thailand) Kongdej Lukbangplasoi	Rajadamnern Stadium	Bangkok, Thailand	KO (Elbow)	2	
1968-11-10	Loss	(Thailand) Dejrit Itthianuchit	Charusathian Stadium, Chionoi vs Villacampo	Bangkok, Thailand	KO	1	0:40
Loses the Rajadamnern Stadium Welterweight (147 lbs) title.
1968-09-30	Win	(Thailand) Monsawan Laemfahpa	Rajadamnern Stadium	Bangkok, Thailand	TKO (Referee Stoppage)	4	
1968-08-21	Win	(Thailand) Dejrit Itthianuchit	Rajadamnern Stadium	Bangkok, Thailand	Decision	5	3:00
1968-	Win	(Thailand) Yodthong Sahaisuk		Bangkok, Thailand			
1968-	Win	(Thailand) Phananan Lukpanjama		Bangkok, Thailand			
1968-07-15	Win	(Thailand) Sukkasem Saifalap	Rajadamnern Stadium	Bangkok, Thailand	Decision	5	3:00
1968-	Win	(Thailand) Dejthai Ratchadet	Rajadamnern Stadium	Bangkok, Thailand			
1968-05-31	Win	(Thailand) Prabsuk Sirikorn	Rajadamnern Stadium	Bangkok, Thailand	KO	1	
1968-01-15	Win	(Thailand) Dejrit Itthianuchit	Rajadamnern Stadium	Bangkok, Thailand	KO (Punches)	3	
Wins the Rajadamnern Stadium Welterweight (147 lbs) title.
1967-12-06	Win	(Thailand) Rawee Dechachai	Rajadamnern Stadium	Bangkok, Thailand	Decision	5	3:00
1967-09-27	Loss	(Thailand) Dejrit Itthianuchit	Lumpinee Stadium	Bangkok, Thailand	KO	2	
For the Thailand and Lumpinee Stadium Welterweight (147 lbs) title.
1967-07-03	Win	(Thailand) Rawee Dechachai		Bangkok, Thailand	KO (Body Kicks)	4	
1967-04-05	Loss	(Thailand) Dejrit Itthianuchit	Rajadamnern Stadium	Bangkok, Thailand	TKO	3	
1967-03-19	Win	(Thailand) Payap Sakulsuk	Lumpinee Stadium	Bangkok, Thailand	Decision	5	3:00
1966-10-18	Loss	(Thailand) Danchai Ploenjit (Yontharakit)	Lumpinee Stadium	Bangkok, Thailand	KO (Low kick)	2	
Apidej stripped of his titles for being stopped in a non-title fight and on suspicion of fraud.
1966-07-05	Win	(Thailand) Chakkrit Nakornsuk	Lumpinee Stadium	Bangkok, Thailand	KO (Knee to the head)	2	
1965-06-29	Win	(Thailand) Prakaikaew Luksor	Lumpinee Stadium	Bangkok, Thailand	Decision	5	3:00
1965-02-25	Win	(Thailand) Sornchai Mallayut	Rajadamnern Stadium	Bangkok, Thailand	KO	2	
1964-11-03	Win	(Thailand) Dejrit Itthianuchit	Lumpinee Stadium	Bangkok, Thailand	Decision	5	3:00
Defends the Thailand Welterweight 147 lbs title.
1964-09-08	Win	(Thailand) Daoprakai Sor.Pinjisak	Lumpinee Stadium	Bangkok, Thailand	KO (Kicks)	3	
1964-08-04	Win	(Thailand) Dejrit Itthianuchit	Lumpinee Stadium	Bangkok, Thailand	TKO (Doctor stoppage)	2	
Wins the Lumpinee Stadium Welterweight (147 lbs) title, inaugural Thailand Welterweight (147) lbs title, and receives the Yodmuaythai trophy.
1964-04-09	Win	(Thailand)	Lumpinee Stadium	Bangkok, Thailand	KO	1	
1964-02-13	Loss	(Thailand) Dejrit Itthianuchit	Rajadamnern Stadium	Bangkok, Thailand	Decision	5	3:00
1963-12-19	Win	(Thailand) Rakkiat Kiatmuangyom	Rajadamnern Stadium	Bangkok, Thailand	KO	2	
1963-09-19	Win	(Thailand) Sornchai Mallayut	Rajadamnern Stadium	Bangkok, Thailand	Decision	5	3:00
Defends the Rajadamnern Stadium Welterweight (147 lbs) title.
1963-07-13	Win	(Thailand) Chalamsak Klongpajon	Rajadamnern Stadium	Bangkok, Thailand	Decision	5	3:00
1963-06-06	Win	(Thailand) Dejrit Itthianuchit	Rajadamnern Stadium	Bangkok, Thailand	KO (Elbow)	1	
Defends the Rajadamnern Stadium Welterweight (147 lbs) title and receives the Yodmuaythai trophy.
1963-03-21	Win	(Thailand) Sornchai Mallayut	Rajadamnern Stadium	Bangkok, Thailand	Decision	5	3:00
Defends the Rajadamnern Stadium Welterweight (147 lbs) title.
1963-02-05	Win	(Thailand) Sompong Jaroenmuang	Lumpinee Stadium	Bangkok, Thailand	TKO (Broken arm)	2	3:00
1962-11-13	Win	(Thailand) Sornchai Mallayut	Rajadamnern Stadium	Bangkok, Thailand	Decision	5	3:00
Wins the Rajadamnern Stadium Welterweight (147 lbs) title.
1962-09-13	Win	(Thailand) Adul Srisothon	Rajadamnern Stadium	Bangkok, Thailand	Decision	5	3:00
Receives the Yodmuaythai trophy.
1962-08-17	Win	(Thailand) Suchai Kesongkram	Rajadamnern Stadium	Bangkok, Thailand	Decision	5	3:00
1962-05-31	Win	(Thailand) Srisawat SitSor.Por. (Thiamprasit)	Rajadamnern Stadium	Bangkok, Thailand	KO	2	
1962-04-05	Win	(Thailand) Srisawat SitSor.Por. (Thiamprasit)	Rajadamnern Stadium	Bangkok, Thailand	Decision	5	3:00
1962-02-08	Win	(Thailand) Rawee Dechachai	Rajadamnern Stadium	Bangkok, Thailand	Decision	5	3:00
1961-12-08	Win	(Thailand) Srisawat Thiamprasit	Lumpinee Stadium	Bangkok, Thailand	KO (Low Kicks)	3	
1961-10-19	Loss	(Thailand) Adul Srisothon	Rajadamnern Stadium	Bangkok, Thailand	KO (Knees)	4	
For the Yodmuaythai trophy.
1961-08-31	Win	(Thailand) Kiewwan Yontharakit	Rajadamnern Stadium	Bangkok, Thailand	Decision	5	3:00
1961-	Win	(Thailand) Chakaj Poonchai		Bangkok, Thailand			
1961-06-13	Win	(Thailand) Danchai Yontharakit	Lumpinee Stadium	Bangkok, Thailand	KO		
1960-09-13	Loss	(Thailand) Chakaj Poonchai	Lumpinee Stadium	Bangkok, Thailand	KO	3	
1960-04-16	Loss	(Thailand) Sinchai Ror.Sor.Por.	Lumpinee Stadium Pone Kingpetch vs Pascual Perez	Bangkok, Thailand	KO		
1960-	Loss	(Thailand) Kumandej Pitaksamut		Samut Songkhram province, Thailand	KO (Elbow)	3	
1960	Win	(Thailand)		Bangkok, Thailand			
1960	Win	(Thailand)		Bangkok, Thailand			
1960	Win	(Thailand)		Bangkok, Thailand			
1959-12-25	Win	(Thailand) Pansak Wittichai	Lumpinee Stadium	Bangkok, Thailand	KO (High kick)	1	
Legend: Win Loss Draw/No contest Notes
