= Yodkhunpon Sittraiphum =

Thai former professional Muay Thai fighter

Yodkhunpon Sittraipum
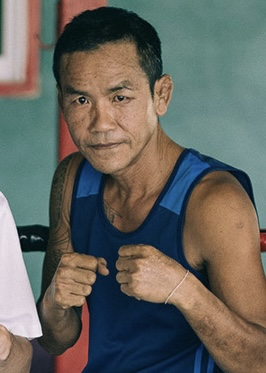
- Yodkhunpon in 2022
- Born: Mongkon Suknongbwa; May 4, 1968; Suwannaphum, Thailand
- Native name: มงคล สุดหนองบัว
- Nickname: Elbow Hunter of 100 Stitches (พรานศอก 100 เข็ม)
- Height: 168 cm (5 ft 6 in)
- Division: Flyweight; Bantamweight
- Style: Muay Thai (Muay Sok)
- Stance: Southpaw
- Team: Lukjaopomehsak Gym; Pinsinchai Gym
- Years active: c. 1980–1995

Other information
- Occupation: Muay Thai fighter (retired); Muay Thai trainer

Mongkon Suknongbwa (Thai: มงคล สุดหนองบัว; born May 4, 1968), known professionally as Yodkhunpon Sittraipum (Thai: ยอดขุนพล ศิษย์ไตรภูมิ), is a Thai former professional Muay Thai fighter. He is a former Lumpinee Stadium and Rajadamnern Stadium champion at Bantamweight who was famous in the 1990s. Nicknamed the "Elbow Hunter of 100 Stitches", he is often regarded as the greatest "Muay Sok" (elbow fighter) in the history of Muay Thai.

== Biography and career ==
Mongkon Suknongbwa was born on May 4, 1968 in Suwannaphum, Thailand. He began training and fighting in Muay Thai at the age of twelve at Sitraipum camp which was just a field with rudimentary equipment, and no ring in the Roi Et Province. He received his ring name under the teaching of Thongpon Kwamsawat.
Yodkhunpon followed his team when it moved to establish an actual gym called Lukjaopomehsak. There he trained alongside Samson Isaan before going to Bangkok to fight. Yodkhunpon received his nickname during the period when he fought at Samrong Stadium, where one of the officials, Anucha Watcharatangka, called him the "Elbow Hunter of 100 Stitches" as his opponents would always end the fights with cuts, win or lose.

After his fighting career, Yodkhunpon went to live in Pattaya and became a trainer for various camps including Petchrungruang.

== Titles & honours ==
- Lumpinee Stadium
  - 1992 Lumpinee Stadium Bantamweight (118 lbs) Champion
- Rajadamnern Stadium
  - 1992 Rajadamnern Stadium Bantamweight (118 lbs) Champion
    - One successful title defense
- Omnoi Stadium
  - 1991 2nd Isuzu Cup Tournament Runner-up

== Fight record ==
Muay Thai Record (Incomplete)
| Date | Result | Opponent | Event | Location | Method | Round | Time |
|---|---|---|---|---|---|---|---|
| 1995- | Loss | (Thailand) Michael Thammakasem | Rajadamnern Stadium | Bangkok, Thailand | Decision | 5 | 3:00 |
| 1994-03-03 | Loss | (Thailand) Dokmaipa Por.Pongsawang | Asawindam, Rajadamnern Stadium | Bangkok, Thailand | Decision | 5 | 3:00 |
| 1993-12-13 | Win | (Thailand) Kasemlek Kiatsiri | Asawindam, Rajadamnern Stadium | Bangkok, Thailand | Decision | 5 | 3:00 |
| 1993-09-16 | Loss | (Thailand) Jaroensak Kiatnakornchon | Asawindam, Rajadamnern Stadium | Bangkok, Thailand | KO (Punches) | 2 | |
Loses the Rajadamnern Stadium Bantamweight (118 lbs) title.
| 1993-07-13 | Loss | (Thailand) Kengkat Kiatkamthorn | Lumpinee Stadium | Bangkok, Thailand | Decision | 5 | 3:00 |
| 1993-05-26 | Win | (Thailand) Namtaothong Sor.Sirikul | Phalangnum, Rajadamnern Stadium | Bangkok, Thailand | Decision | 5 | 3:00 |
Defends the Rajadamnern Stadium Bantamweight (118 lbs) title.
| 1993-04-27 | Loss | (Thailand) Saenklai SitKruOd | Petchyindee, Lumpinee Stadium | Bangkok, Thailand | Decision | 5 | 3:00 |
Loses the Lumpinee Stadium Bantamweight (118 lbs) title.
| 1993-03-12 | Loss | (Thailand) Anantasak Panyuthaphum | Jatuchok, Lumpinee Stadium | Bangkok, Thailand | KO (Punch) | 2 | |
| 1993-02-02 | Loss | (Thailand) Changnoi Sirimongkol | Petchyindee, Rajadamnern Stadium | Bangkok, Thailand | Decision | 5 | 3:00 |
| 1992-12-25 | Loss | (Thailand) Singdam Or.Ukrit | Chaomangkon, Lumpinee Stadium | Bangkok, Thailand | Decision | 5 | 3:00 |
| 1992-12-08 | Win | (Thailand) Jaroensak Kiatnakornchon | Petchyindee, Lumpinee Stadium | Bangkok, Thailand | Decision | 5 | 3:00 |
Wins the Lumpinee Stadium Bantamweight (118 lbs) title.
| 1992-09-07 | Win | (Thailand) Kraisuwit Soonkeelanongki | Phetthongkham, Rajadamnern Stadium | Bangkok, Thailand | TKO (Doctor stoppage) | 4 | |
Wins Rajadamnern Stadium Bantamweight (118 lbs) title.
| 1992-08-04 | Loss | (Thailand) Jaroensak Kiatnakornchon | Petchyindee, Lumpinee Stadium | Bangkok, Thailand | Decision | 5 | 3:00 |
| 1992-06-26 | Win | (Thailand) Seesot Kiatchitthanok | Petchyindee, Lumpinee Stadium | Bangkok, Thailand | KO (Left cross) | 3 | |
| 1992-06-02 | Win | (Thailand) Singnoi Sor.Prasatporn | Petchyindee, Lumpinee Stadium | Bangkok, Thailand | TKO (Doctor stoppage) | 3 | |
| 1992-04-29 | Loss | (Thailand) Singnoi Sor.Prasatporn | Palangnum, Rajadamnern Stadium | Bangkok, Thailand | KO (Right high kick) | 1 | |
| 1992-03-31 | Win | (Thailand) Saenklai SitKruOd | Petchyindee, Lumpinee Stadium | Bangkok, Thailand | Decision | 5 | 3:00 |
| 1992-03-06 | Win | (Thailand) Changnoi Sirimongkol | WanmuayJor.Por.Ror.7 + Petchyindee, Lumpinee Stadium | Bangkok, Thailand | TKO (Doctor stoppage) | 3 | |
| 1992-02-16 | Draw | (Thailand) Changnoi Sirimongkol | Samrong Stadium | Bangkok, Thailand | Decision | 5 | 3:00 |
| 1992-01-24 | Win | (Thailand) Jaroenchai Sitjomtong | Petchyindee, Lumpinee Stadium | Bangkok, Thailand | Decision | 5 | 3:00 |
| 1991-12-20 | Loss | (Thailand) Changnoi Sirimongkol | Petchyindee, Lumpinee Stadium | Bangkok, Thailand | Decision | 5 | 3:00 |
| 1991-10-29 | Loss | (Thailand) Saenklai SitKruOd | Petchyindee, Lumpinee Stadium | Bangkok, Thailand | Decision | 5 | 3:00 |
| 1991-09-20 | Win | (Thailand) Changnoi Sirimongkol | Petchyindee, Lumpinee Stadium | Bangkok, Thailand | Decision | 5 | 3:00 |
| 1991-08-23 | Win | (Thailand) Prakardseuk Keatmuengtrang | Lumpinee Stadium | Bangkok, Thailand | KO (Elbow) | 4 | |
| 1991-07-23 | Win | (Thailand) Wanwiset Kaennorasing | Petchyindee, Lumpinee Stadium | Bangkok, Thailand | KO (Knee) | 3 | |
| 1991-06-18 | Loss | (Thailand) Changnoi Sirimongkol | Lumpinee Stadium | Bangkok, Thailand | Decision | 5 | 3:00 |
| 1991-05-06 | Win | (Thailand) Wichan Sitsuchon | Yodnuamthong, Rajadamnern Stadium | Bangkok, Thailand | KO (Left high kick) | 3 | |
| 1991-04-09 | Win | (Thailand) Phanomrung Sitbanchong | | Bangkok, Thailand | Decision | 5 | 3:00 |
| 1991-03-09 | Loss | (Thailand) Robert Kaennorasing | Samrong Stadium - Isuzu Cup Final | Samut Prakan, Thailand | Decision | 5 | 3:00 |
For the Isuzu Cup title.
| 1991-01-19 | Win | (Thailand) Pennoi Kiatwichan | Samrong Stadium - Isuzu Cup Semi Final | Samut Prakan, Thailand | Decision | 5 | 3:00 |
| 1990-12-16 | Win | (Thailand) Chartchainoi Chaorai-Oi | Samrong Stadium - Isuzu Cup | Samut Prakan, Thailand | Decision | 5 | 3:00 |
| 1990-11-11 | Win | (Thailand) Daoruang Kiatprathuang | Samrong Stadium - Isuzu Cup | Samut Prakan, Thailand | Decision | 5 | 3:00 |
| 1990-10-07 | Win | (Thailand) Kongklai Muangchaiyaphum | Samrong Stadium - Isuzu Cup | Samut Prakan, Thailand | TKO (Doctor stoppage) | 3 | |
| 1990-09-07 | Loss | (Thailand) Prakardseuk Keatmuangtrang | Petchyindee, Lumpinee Stadium | Bangkok, Thailand | KO | 2 | |
| 1990-06-26 | Draw | (Thailand) Panomrung Sitbanjong | Jatuchok, Samrong Stadium | Samut Prakan, Thailand | Decision | 5 | 3:00 |
| 1990-05-27 | Win | (United States) Jimmy Ray Tapia | | Phoenix, USA | TKO (Knees) | 3 | |
| 1990-04-29 | Loss | (Thailand) Somchai Kiatanan | Samrong Stadium | Samut Prakan, Thailand | Decision | 5 | 3:00 |
| 1990-03-02 | Win | (Thailand) Prakardseuk Keatmuengtrang | WanmuayJor.Por.Ror.7 + Petchyindee, Lumpinee Stadium | Bangkok, Thailand | Decision | 5 | 3:00 |
| 1990-01-14 | Win | (Thailand) Kongklai Muangchaiyaphum | Samrong Stadium | Samut Prakan, Thailand | KO | 2 | |
| 1989-12-08 | Win | (Thailand) Kwanjai Chor.Vigo | Petchyindee, Lumpinee Stadium | Bangkok, Thailand | KO (Left high kick) | 4 | |
| 1989-10-30 | Win | (Thailand) Kwanjai Chor.Vigo | Muayeksamrong, Chanthaburi Boxing Stadium | Chanthaburi, Thailand | Decision | 5 | 3:00 |
| 1989-09-24 | Win | (Thailand) Thongsabad Piyaphan | Samrong Stadium | Samut Prakan, Thailand | Decision | 5 | 3:00 |
| 1989-08-20 | Win | (Thailand) Khemphet Kiatakorn | Samrong Stadium | Samut Prakan, Thailand | Decision | 5 | 3:00 |
| 1989-07-02 | Win | (Thailand) Chakchai Naruemon | | Thailand | Decision | 5 | 3:00 |
| 1989-05-14 | Win | (Thailand) Paiboon Naruemon | Samrong Stadium | Samut Prakan, Thailand | TKO (Doctor Stoppage) | 4 | |
| 1989-04-21 | Loss | (Thailand) Daorung Sitchaiporn | Yodmuayisan, Chum Phae District Boxing Stadium | Khon Kaen, Thailand | Decision | 5 | 3:00 |
| 1989-03-26 | Win | (Thailand) Khunapap Sakpradu | | Khon Kaen, Thailand | KO | 3 | |
| 1989-03-04 | Win | (Thailand) Montien Saksongkhram | | Khon Kaen, Thailand | Decision | 5 | 3:00 |
| 1989-02- | Win | (Thailand) Rungrojnoi Kiatanan | Lumpinee Stadium | Bangkok, Thailand | KO | 3 | |
| 1989-01- | Win | (Thailand) Mai Sitlawanee | | Roi Et, Thailand | Decision | 5 | 3:00 |
| 1987-06-30 | Loss | (Thailand) Therdkiat Sitphonphitak | | Isan, Thailand | Decision | 5 | 3:00 |
For the Isan Regional Flyweight (112 lbs) title.
Legend: Win Loss Draw/No contest Notes
