= Saenklai SitKruOd =

Thai professional Muay Thai fighter (1973–2019)

- Saenklai c. 1991-1993
- Born: Sachart Krailart; July 7, 1973; Bua Yai, Nakhon Ratchasima, Thailand
- Died: December 15, 2019 (aged 46); Bua Yai, Nakhon Ratchasima, Thailand
- Native name: สุชาติ ไกรลาศ
- Other names: Klaisen Netsongkram
- Nickname: Top Boxer of Bua Yai (ยอดมวยบัวใหญ่); Graceful Warrior of the Wind (จอมยุทธพลิ้ววาโย); Pig (หมู, personal nickname)
- Height: 164 cm (5 ft 5 in)
- Division: Super Flyweight; Bantamweight; Super Bantamweight
- Reach: 165 cm (65 in)
- Style: Muay Thai (Muay Femur)
- Stance: Orthodox
- Team: SitKruOd Gym
- Trainer: Poompichai "Kru Od" Rattanavisid
- Years active: 1984–1997

Other information
- Notable relatives: Kangwannoi Or.Sribualoi (older half-brother)

Sachart Krailart (Thai: สุชาติ ไกรลาศ; July 7, 1973 – December 15, 2019), known professionally as Saenklai SitKruOd (Thai: แสนไกล ศิษย์ครูอ๊อด), was a Thai professional Muay Thai fighter. He was a two-time Lumpinee Stadium Bantamweight Champion who was famous in the 1990s. Nicknamed the "Top Boxer of Bua Yai", he was known especially for his technical ability and is often regarded as one of the greatest fighters in the history of Muay Thai.

There are numerous anglicizations of Saenklai's name, including but not limited to: Sanklai Sitkru-Ott, Saengrai Sitkruodd, or Saengrai Sit Kru Aod.

== Biography ==
=== Early life ===
Sachart Krailart was born on July 7, 1973 in Bua Yai, Nakhon Ratchasima province. He was the 4th child of his family with 6 siblings. His personal nickname was Moo. He was inspired to take up Muay Thai at the age of 11 after watching his older half-brother Kangwannoi Or.Sribualoi fight out of the Sit Kru Od gym located in their hometown of Bua Yai. Under the tutelage of Poompichai "Kru Od" Rattanavisid, he had his first fight after three months of training under the ring name of Klaisen Netsongkram. Fighting between 66 and 77 lbs (30–35 kg), he rapidly became a recognized talent in Isan, the northeastern region of Thailand where he faced future champions such as Robert Kaennorasing and Samson Isaan. He then ran out of opponents in Isan.

In 1988, around 4 years into his Muay Thai career, he started fighting in the metropolitan Bangkok area. At first, he fought in Samrong Stadium (Note: Despite its name, the Samrong Stadium was located in Samut Prakan province hence it was in the Bangkok Metropolitan Region.) until he reached the 100 lbs (45.36 kg) weight division. He then began fighting primarily in Lumpinee Stadium under the Petchyindee promotion. After he made his successful Lumpinee debut against Rattanachai Sitrattanachai, his later performances were inconsistent. He then adopted the ring name of Saenklai Sit Kru Od (translates to "Saenklai, student of trainer Od") and quickly rose to the top of the competitive landscape, becoming a popular fighter in the Lumpinee Stadium. The stadium's officials incorrectly printed his ring name as "Saenkrai" (แสนไกร) for a year.

=== Fighting in Bangkok ===
Saenklai was an orthodox Muay Femur fighter (Muay Thai equivalent to rope-a-dope boxers), meaning that he preferred to walk backwards and used strategic approaches to his fights. He excelled finding opportunities to throw his right kick or to maneuver himself or his opponents away. He also was skilled at using teeps and knee guards to stop his opponents in place or to defend strikes, catching his opponent's kicks to counter them or to make them fall, and pushing on his opponent's faces or chests during striking exchanges to create distance or to disrupt their balance. Saenklai was described in Thai as having a "strong mind" meaning that he was a durable fighter. In its prime, the Sit Kru Od gym where Saenklai and Kangwannoi Or.Sribualoi trained in was famous for producing intelligent fighters as Kru Od believed that a fighter's intelligence was their greatest asset. Kangwannoi was also described to be an intelligent fighter with a strong mind. Saenklai and Kangwannoi were 2 of the 4 fighters that first made the Sit Kru Od gym famous in Thailand. They both won the Lumpinee Bantamweight title.

Saenklai's most significant achievements were his Lumpinee Bantamweight title wins. He earned the title in 1991, but then lost it to Samson Isaan in the same year. He won it again in 1993 and defended it 6 times in the next 18 months. He then won the World Muay Thai Council Super Bantamweight title in 1995. During that year, Saenklai was considered to be one of the most successful Muay Thai fighters in the Kingdom of Thailand. He was noted for his 11-fight rivalry against Samson; Saenklai secured 6 victories against the award-winning pressure fighter. Saenklai was nicknamed by Thai audiences as Yodmuay Bua Yai (Muay Thai Master from Bua Yai) and Jomyuth Pliewayo (The Active Footwork Fighter).

Saenklai's prime lasted from 1990 to 1996. He was considered to be one of the most significant fighters in the 115 to 118 lbs (52.16–53.52 kg) weight divisions during the golden era of Muay Thai. His highest purse reached ฿250,000 (equivalent to ฿496,168 in 2020). 1993 was the most significant year of his combat sports career. During that time, Saenklai accumulated 9 wins against elite fighters and had only 2 losses.

Saenklai retired after being knocked out by Jaoweha Looktapfah on October 12, 1997. His victories against Veeraphol Sahaprom, Silapathai Jockygym, Taweesaklek Ploysakda, and Anantasak Panyuthaphum were considered his best fights. He had a missed fight against Kaensak Sor.Ploenjit. Saenklai cited Veeraphol to be the most difficult opponent he ever faced. He would go on to run a family business in his hometown of Bua Yai. He trained some Muay Thai fighters when he was able to.

=== Death ===
In the time leading up to his death, Saenklai almost died from tuberculosis but was saved by his doctor at Maharat Nakhon Ratchasima Hospital. He was then sent to Bua Yai Hospital for further treatment and was later sent back home to recover. On December 15, 2019, Saenklai died at his home in Bua Yai from tuberculosis complications at the age of 46.

== Titles and accomplishments ==
- Lumpinee Stadium
  - 1991 Lumpinee Stadium Bantamweight (118 lbs) Champion
  - 1993 Lumpinee Stadium Bantamweight (118 lbs) Champion
    - Six successful title defenses
- World Muaythai Council
  - 1995 WMTC World Super Bantamweight (118 lbs) Champion
    - One successful title defense

== Muay Thai record ==
Muay Thai record
Date	Result	Opponent	Event	Location	Method	Round	Time
1998-06-23	Loss	(Thailand) Chaidet Kiatchansing	Petchyindee, Lumpinee Stadium	Bangkok, Thailand	KO	4	
1997-10-12	Loss	(Thailand) Jaoweha Looktapfah	Channel 7 Boxing Stadium	Bangkok, Thailand	KO	3	
1997-06-24	Loss	(Thailand) Anantasak Panyuthaphum	Petchyindee, Lumpinee Stadium	Bangkok, Thailand	KO	3	
Loses the WMC World Super Bantamweight (122 lbs) title.
1997-03-16	Loss	(Thailand) Manopchai Singmanassak	Channel 7 Boxing Stadium	Bangkok, Thailand	Decision	5	3:00
1996-	Loss	(Thailand) Singdam Or.Ukrit	Omnoi Stadium - Isuzu Cup	Samut Sakhon, Thailand	Decision	5	3:00
1996-11-09	Loss	(Thailand) Anantasak Panyuthaphum	Omnoi Stadium - Isuzu Cup	Samut Sakhon, Thailand	Decision	5	3:00
1996-09-21	Loss	(Thailand) Chutin Por.Tawachai	Omnoi Stadium	Samut Sakhon, Thailand	Decision	5	3:00
1996-08-27	Win	(Thailand) Muangfahlek Kiatwichian	Petchyindee, Lumpinee Stadium	Bangkok, Thailand	Decision	5	3:00
1996-08-05	Draw	(Thailand) Chutin Por.Tawachai	Phetthongkham, Rajadamnern Stadium	Bangkok, Thailand	Decision	5	3:00
1996-06-14	Draw	(Thailand) Namtaotong Sor.Sirikul	Daorungtvsi 7, Lumpinee Stadium	Bangkok, Thailand	Decision	5	3:00
1996-05-10	Loss	(Thailand) Changnoi Sirimongkol	Petchyindee, Lumpinee Stadium	Bangkok, Thailand	Decision	5	3:00
1996-02-02	Win	(Thailand) Phetnamnueng Por.Chatchai	Petchyindee, Lumpinee Stadium	Bangkok, Thailand	Decision	5	3:00
Defends the WMC World Super Bantamweight (122 lbs) title.
1995-11-21	Win	(Thailand) Changnoi Sirimongkol	Petchyindee, Lumpinee Stadium	Bangkok, Thailand	Decision	5	3:00
Wins the WMC World Super Bantamweight (122 lbs) title.
1995-10-20	Draw	(Thailand) Phetnamnueng Por.Chatchai	Jatuchok, Lumpinee Stadium	Bangkok, Thailand	Decision	5	3:00
1995-09-19	Win	(Thailand) Noppadet Sakmuangklaeng	Daorungtvsi 7, Lumpinee Stadium	Bangkok, Thailand	Decision	5	3:00
1995-08-22	Win	(Thailand) Changnoi Sirimongkol	Ruamnamjailumpinee, Lumpinee Stadium	Bangkok, Thailand	Decision	5	3:00
1995-07-13	Win	(Thailand) Muangfahlek Kiatwichian	Daorungchucharoen, Rajadamnern Stadium	Bangkok, Thailand	Decision	5	3:00
1995-05-09	Loss	(Thailand) Phetnamnueng Por.Chatchai	Petchyindee, Lumpinee Stadium	Bangkok, Thailand	Decision	5	3:00
For the Lumpinee Stadium Bantamweight (118 lbs) title.
1995-03-14	Draw	(Thailand) Phetnamnueng Por.Chatchai	Jatuchok, Lumpinee Stadium	Bangkok, Thailand	Decision	5	3:00
1995-02-17	Loss	(Thailand) Phetnamnueng Por.Chatchai	Petchyindee, Lumpinee Stadium	Bangkok, Thailand	Decision	5	3:00
Loses the Lumpinee Stadium Bantamweight (118 lbs) title.
1995-01-20	Win	(Thailand) Anantasak Panyuthaphum	Petchyindee, Lumpinee Stadium	Bangkok, Thailand	Decision	5	3:00
1994-12-27	Loss	(Thailand) Changnoi Sirimongkol	Kiatphet, Lumpinee Stadium	Bangkok, Thailand	Decision	5	3:00
1994-11-25	Win	(Thailand) Dara-Ek Sitrungsap	Petchyindee, Lumpinee Stadium	Bangkok, Thailand	Decision	5	3:00
1994-09-23	Loss	(Thailand) Veeraphol Sahaprom	Daorungtvsi 7, Lumpinee Stadium	Bangkok, Thailand	Decision	5	3:00
1994-08-05	Win	(Thailand) Singdam Or.Ukrit	Petchyindee, Lumpinee Stadium	Bangkok, Thailand	Decision	5	3:00
Defends the Lumpinee Stadium Bantamweight (118 lbs) title.
1994-07-05	Win	(Thailand) Tukatathong Por.Pongsawang	Petchyindee, Lumpinee Stadium	Bangkok, Thailand	Decision	5	3:00
1994-06-07	Win	(Thailand) Dara-Ek Sitrungsap	Petchyindee, Lumpinee Stadium	Bangkok, Thailand	Decision	5	3:00
Defends the Lumpinee Stadium Bantamweight (118 lbs) title.
1994-05-20	Draw	(Thailand) Dara-Ek Sitrungsap	Petchyindee, Lumpinee Stadium	Bangkok, Thailand	Decision	5	3:00
Defends the Lumpinee Stadium Bantamweight (118 lbs) title.
1994-03-29	Win	(Thailand) Singdam Or.Ukrit	Petchyindee, Lumpinee Stadium	Bangkok, Thailand	KO (Right cross)	4	
Defends the Lumpinee Stadium Bantamweight (118 lbs) title.
1994-02-18	Loss	(Thailand) Singdam Or.Ukrit	Petchyindee, Lumpinee Stadium	Bangkok, Thailand	Decision	5	3:00
1994-01-25	Win	(Thailand) Samson Isaan	Petchyindee, Lumpinee Stadium	Bangkok, Thailand	Decision	5	3:00
1994-01-08	Loss	(Thailand) Singdam Or.Ukrit	Jaomuaythai, Omnoi Stadium	Samut Sakhon, Thailand	Decision	5	3:00
1993-12-07	Win	(Thailand) Anantasak Panyuthaphum	Lumpinee Stadium	Bangkok, Thailand	Decision	5	3:00
Defends the Lumpinee Stadium Bantamweight (118 lbs) title.
1993-11-05	Win	(Thailand) Jomhodlek Rattanachot	Kiatphet, Lumpinee Stadium	Bangkok, Thailand	Decision	5	3:00
1993-10-15	Loss	(Thailand) Dokmaipa Por.Pongsawang	Petchyindee, Lumpinee Stadium	Bangkok, Thailand	Decision	5	3:00
1993-09-03	Win	(Thailand) Dara-Ek Sitrungsap	Petchyindee, Lumpinee Stadium	Bangkok, Thailand	Decision	5	3:00
1993-08-10	Win	(Thailand) Jomhodlek Rattanachot	Petchyindee, Lumpinee Stadium	Bangkok, Thailand	Decision	5	3:00
Defends the Lumpinee Stadium Bantamweight (118 lbs) title.
1993-06-22	Loss	(Thailand) Jomhodlek Rattanachot	Petchyindee, Lumpinee Stadium	Bangkok, Thailand	Decision	5	3:00
1993-05-18	Win	(Thailand) Dara-Ek Sitrungsap	Lumpinee Stadium	Bangkok, Thailand	Decision	5	3:00
1993-04-27	Win	(Thailand) Yodkhunpon Sittraiphum	Petchyindee, Lumpinee Stadium	Bangkok, Thailand	Decision	5	3:00
Wins the Lumpinee Stadium Bantamweight (118 lbs) title.
1993-04-02	Win	(Thailand) Anantasak Panyuthaphum	Lumpinee Stadium	Bangkok, Thailand	Decision	5	3:00
1993-03-12	Win	(Thailand) Samson Isaan	Jatuchok, Lumpinee Stadium	Bangkok, Thailand	Decision	5	3:00
1993-01-31	Win	(Thailand) Veeraphol Sahaprom	Daorungchucharoen, Rajadamnern Stadium	Bangkok, Thailand	Decision	5	3:00
1992-12-25	Win	(Thailand) Veeraphol Sahaprom	Lumpinee Stadium	Bangkok, Thailand	Decision	5	3:00
1992-12-08	Loss	(Thailand) Samson Isaan	Lumpinee Stadium	Bangkok, Thailand	Decision	5	3:00
1992-10-30	Win	(Thailand) Burklerk Pinsinchai	Petchyindee, Lumpinee Stadium	Bangkok, Thailand	Decision	5	3:00
1992-10-09	Loss	(Thailand) Changnoi Sirimongkol		Bangkok, Thailand	Decision	5	3:00
1992-08-28	Win	(Thailand) Jaroensak Kiatnakornchon	Lumpinee Stadium	Bangkok, Thailand	Decision	5	3:00
1992-07-28	Win	(Thailand) Silapathai Jockygym	Jatuchok, Lumpinee Stadium	Bangkok, Thailand	Decision	5	3:00
1992-06-26	Win	(Thailand) Kiewmorakot Prayanan	Lumpinee Stadium	Bangkok, Thailand	Decision	5	3:00
1992-06-02	Loss	(Thailand) Taweesaklek Ploysakda	Lumpinee Stadium	Bangkok, Thailand	Decision	5	3:00
1992-03-31	Loss	(Thailand) Yodkhunpon Sittraiphum	Petchyindee, Lumpinee Stadium	Bangkok, Thailand	Decision	5	3:00
1992-03-06	Loss	(Thailand) Singdam Or.Ukrit	Wanmuay ChorPorRor.7, Lumpinee Stadium	Bangkok, Thailand	Decision	5	3:00
1992-02-14	Draw	(Thailand) Singdam Or.Ukrit	Lumpinee Stadium	Bangkok, Thailand	Decision	5	3:00
1992-01-24	Win	(Thailand) Dentaksin Kiatrattaphon	Lumpinee Stadium	Bangkok, Thailand	KO	1	
1991-11-29	Loss	(Thailand) Samson Isaan	Petchyindee, Lumpinee Stadium	Bangkok, Thailand	KO (Left uppercut)	2	
Loses the Lumpinee Stadium Bantamweight (118 lbs) title.
1991-10-29	Win	(Thailand) Yodkhunpon Sittraiphum	Petchyindee, Lumpinee Stadium	Bangkok, Thailand	Decision	5	3:00
1991-09-20	Loss	(Thailand) Samson Isaan	Petchyindee, Lumpinee Stadium	Bangkok, Thailand	Decision	5	3:00
1991-08-23	Loss	(Thailand) Veeraphol Sahaprom	Petchyindee, Lumpinee Stadium	Bangkok, Thailand	Decision	5	3:00
1991-08-02	Win	(Thailand) Taweesaklek Ploysakda	Petchyindee, Lumpinee Stadium	Bangkok, Thailand	TKO (Punches)	3	
1991-06-18	Win	(Thailand) Taweesaklek Ploysakda	Petchyindee, Lumpinee Stadium	Bangkok, Thailand	Decision	5	3:00
Wins the Lumpinee Stadium Bantamweight (118 lbs) title.
1991-04-26	Win	(Thailand) Panomrung Sitbanchong	Lumpinee Stadium	Bangkok, Thailand	Decision	5	3:00
1991-03-19	Win	(Thailand) Jaroensak Kiatnakornchon	Lumpinee Stadium	Bangkok, Thailand	Decision	5	3:00
1991-02-19	Win	(Thailand) Kaimthaew Sitkuan	Lumpinee Stadium	Bangkok, Thailand	Decision	5	3:00
1991-01-18	Win	(Thailand) Pepsi Biyapan	Petchyindee, Lumpinee Stadium	Bangkok, Thailand	Decision	5	3:00
1990-12-14	Loss	(Thailand) Dentaksin Kiatrattaphol	Lumpinee Stadium	Bangkok, Thailand	Decision	5	3:00
1990-11-23	Win	(Thailand) Dentaksin Kiatrattaphol	Lumpinee Stadium	Bangkok, Thailand	Decision	5	3:00
1990-11-06	Win	(Thailand) Denthaksin Kiatrattaphol	Lumpinee Stadium	Bangkok, Thailand	Decision	5	3:00
1990-10-19	Win	(Thailand) Samson Isaan	Lumpinee Stadium	Bangkok, Thailand	Decision	5	3:00
1990-09-21	Win	(Thailand) Samson Isaan	Lumpinee Stadium	Bangkok, Thailand	Decision	5	3:00
1990-08-28	Win	(Thailand) Somdet Sit Or	Lumpinee Stadium	Bangkok, Thailand	Decision	5	3:00
1990-08-05	Win	(Thailand) Chalong Silapakorn	Lumpinee Stadium	Bangkok, Thailand	Decision	5	3:00
1990-06-22	Win	(Thailand) Chalong Silapakorn	Petchyindee, Lumpinee Stadium	Bangkok, Thailand	Decision	5	3:00
1990-05-25	Win	(Thailand) Chalong Silapakorn	Lumpinee Stadium	Bangkok, Thailand	Decision	5	3:00
1990-03-23	Loss	(Thailand) Chalong Silapakorn	Petchyindee, Lumpinee Stadium	Bangkok, Thailand	Decision	5	3:00
1990-03-02	Win	(Thailand) Rattanachai Wor.Walapon	Lumpinee Stadium	Bangkok, Thailand	Decision	5	3:00
1990-02-12	Win	(Thailand) Yodawut Sor.Tossaphon	Lumpinee Stadium	Bangkok, Thailand	Decision	5	3:00
1989-12-26	Loss	(Thailand) Samson Isaan	Lumpinee Stadium	Bangkok, Thailand	KO (Spinning elbow)	1	
Legend: Win Loss Draw/No contest Notes
