= Chutin Por.Tawachai =

Thai former professional Muay Thai fighter

- Born: Thongchai Leelapha; December 29, 1976 (age 49); Sam Chai, Kalasin, Thailand
- Native name: ธงชัย ลีลาพา
- Other names: Chuthin SitKuanyim (ชูถิ่น ศิษย์กวนอิม); Choothin Por.Thawatchai
- Nickname: Black King Cobra (จงอางทมิฬ)
- Height: 169 cm (5 ft 7 in)
- Division: Flyweight; Super Flyweight; Bantamweight; Super Bantamweight; Featherweight
- Reach: 167 cm (66 in)
- Style: Muay Thai (Muay Femur)
- Stance: Orthodox
- Team: Sit Kuanyim
- Trainer: Orachunnoi Hor.Mahachai; Khundong Por.Tawachai

Thongchai Leelapha (Thai: ธงชัย ลีลาพา; December 29, 1976), known professionally as Chutin Por.Tawachai (Thai: ชูถิ่น พ.ธวัชชัย), is a Thai former professional Muay Thai fighter. He is a former Rajadamnern Stadium Super Bantamweight Champion who fought during the 1990s and 2000s.

== Biography and career ==
Chutin started training in Muay Thai at the age of 10. He later joined the Sit O camp in Buriram where he stayed three years during which he competed in the various eastern provinces of Thailand. Chutin then had the opportunity to join the Sit Kuanyim camp in Bangkok. There he would train under former champion Orachunnoi Hor.Mahachai and made his major stadium debut in 1992 winning on points at the Rajadamnern Stadium.

Chutin defeated many notable fighters of his era including Chamuekpet Hapalang, Saenklai SitKruOd, Anuwat Kaewsamrit, Silapathai Jockygym and Choengnoen Sitphutthapim. The peak of his career was the year 1996 which saw him capture the Rajadamnern Stadium Super Bantamweight title. For his results during that year he was elected Rajadamnern Stadium FIghter of the Year and received the prestigious Sports Authority of Thailand Fighter of the Year award. He also took part in the Isuzu Cup at the end of the year and was eliminated in the semifinals by Anantasak Panyuthapum. He won the 3rd place bout against Changnoi Sirimongkol on April 26, 1997.

After retiring, Chutin became a trainer and moved to Japan.

== Titles and honours ==
- Rajadamnern Stadium
  - 1996 Rajadamnern Stadium Fighter of the Year
  - 1996 Rajadamnern Stadium Super Bantamweight (122 lbs) Champion
- Omnoi Stadium
  - 1997 Isuzu Cup 3rd place

Awards

- 1996 Sports Authority of Thailand Fighter of the Year

== Fight record ==
Muay Thai Record (Incomplete)
Date	Result	Opponent	Event	Location	Method	Round	Time
2003-04-28	Loss	(Thailand) Fapratan Singhmanasak	Rajadamnern Stadium	Bangkok, Thailand	Decision	5	3:00
2003-03-	Loss	(Thailand) Chaomailek Sor.Thantawan	Rajadamnern Stadium	Bangkok, Thailand	Decision	5	3:00
2003-02-05	Loss	(Thailand) Lerdsila Chumpairtour	Daorungchuajroen, Rajadamnern Stadium	Bangkok, Thailand	Decision	5	3:00
2002-10-30	Loss	(Thailand) Anuwat Kaewsamrit	Jarumeang, Rajadamnern Stadium	Bangkok, Thailand	Decision	5	3:00
2002-09-23	Win	(Thailand) Anuwat Kaewsamrit	Daorungchuajroen, Rajadamnern Stadium	Bangkok, Thailand	Decision	5	3:00
2002-03-27	Loss	(Thailand) Rungpetch Sor.Sitthichok	Jarumeang, Rajadamnern Stadium	Bangkok, Thailand	Decision	5	3:00
2000-11-09	Loss	(Thailand) Noppakao Sor.Wanchat	Daorungchuajroen, Rajadamnern Stadium	Bangkok, Thailand	Decision	5	3:00
For the Rajadamnern Stadium Featherweight (126 lbs) title.
2000-09-07	Win	(Thailand) Paluang Panyatip	Jarumueang, Rajadamnern Stadium	Bangkok, Thailand	Decision	5	3:00
2000-08-02	Loss	(Thailand) Noppakao Sor.Wanchat	Rajadamnern Stadium	Bangkok, Thailand	Decision	5	3:00
2000-06-25	Loss	(Thailand) Noparit Kiatnopadol	Channel 7 Stadium	Bangkok, Thailand	Decision	5	3:00
2000-05-18	Win	(Thailand) Silaphet Por.Paointhra	Bangrachan, Rajadamnern Stadium	Bangkok, Thailand	Decision	5	3:00
2000-04-27	Loss	(Thailand) Sila Tor.Bangsaen	Palangnum, Rajadamnern Stadium	Bangkok, Thailand	Decision	5	3:00
1997-12-	Loss	(Thailand) Asawin Kiatmonthep	Rajadamnern Stadium	Bangkok, Thailand	Decision	5	3:00
Loses the Rajadamnern Stadium Super Bantamweight (122 lbs) title.
1997-11-	Win	(Thailand) Asawin Kiatmonthep	Rajadamnern Stadium	Bangkok, Thailand	Decision	5	3:00
1997-08-20	Win	(Thailand) Chaidet Kiatchansing	Palangnum, Rajadamnern Stadium	Bangkok, Thailand	Decision	5	3:00
1997-07-22	Loss	(Thailand) Manopchai NakornthongParkview	Lumpinee Stadium	Bangkok, Thailand	Decision	5	3:00
1997-05-28	Win	(Thailand) Rolex Kaennorasing	Wan Muay Thai, Rajadamnern Stadium	Bangkok, Thailand	Decision	5	3:00
1997-04-26	Win	(Thailand) Changnoi Sirimongkol	Omnoi Stadium - Isuzu Cup, 3rd place bout	Samut Sakhon, Thailand	Decision	5	3:00
1997-02-22	Loss	(Thailand) Singdam Or.Ukrit	Omnoi Stadium - Isuzu Cup Semi Final	Samut Sakhon, Thailand	Decision	5	3:00
1996-12-21	Loss	(Thailand) Anantasak Panyuthapum	Omnoi Stadium - Isuzu Cup	Samut Sakhon, Thailand	Decision	5	3:00
1996-11-02	Win	(Thailand) Komkiat Sor.Thanikul	Omnoi Stadium - Isuzu Cup	Samut Sakhon, Thailand	Decision	5	3:00
1996-09-21	Win	(Thailand) Saenklai SitKruOd	Omnoi Stadium - Isuzu Cup	Samut Sakhon, Thailand	Decision	5	3:00
1996-08-	Draw	(Thailand) Saenklai SitKruOd	Rajadamnern Stadium	Bangkok, Thailand	Decision	5	3:00
1996-07-08	Win	(Thailand) Choengnoen Sitphutthapim	Rajadamnern Stadium	Bangkok, Thailand	Decision	5	3:00
1996-06-21	Win	(Thailand) Changnoi Srimongkol	Petchyindee, Rajadamnern Stadium	Bangkok, Thailand	KO	4	
1996-04-17	Win	(Thailand) Chamuekpet Hapalang	Rajadamnern Stadium	Bangkok, Thailand	Decision	5	3:00
1996-03-20	Win	(Thailand) Silapathai Jockygym	Rajadamnern Stadium	Bangkok, Thailand	Decision	5	3:00
1996-02-26	Loss	(Thailand) Komkiat Sor.Thanikul	Rajadamnern Stadium	Bangkok, Thailand	Decision	5	3:00
1996-01-24	Win	(Thailand) Silapathai Jockygym	Wan Muay Thai, Rajadamnern Stadium	Bangkok, Thailand	Decision	5	3:00
Wins the Rajadamnern Stadium Super Bantamweight (122 lbs) title.
1995-12-20	Win	(Thailand) Nuengsiam Kiatwichian	Rajadamnern Stadium	Bangkok, Thailand	Decision	5	3:00
1995-11-22	Loss	(Thailand) Nuengsiam Kiatwichian	Rajadamnern Stadium	Bangkok, Thailand	Decision	5	3:00
1995-09-20	Win	(Thailand) Nuengsiam Kiatwichian	Rajadamnern Stadium	Bangkok, Thailand	Decision	5	3:00
1995-08-30	Win	(Thailand) Wanghin Por.Chaiwat	Rajadamnern Stadium	Bangkok, Thailand	TKO	1	
1995-07-19	Win	(Thailand) Petcharat Sor.Worapin	Rajadamnern Stadium	Bangkok, Thailand	KO (Elbow)	5	
1995-05-18	Win	(Thailand) Yutthahat Sor.Narongchai	Rajadamnern Stadium	Bangkok, Thailand	Decision	5	3:00
1995-04-20	Win	(Thailand) Ekachai Soonthanomtong	Rajadamnern Stadium	Bangkok, Thailand	Decision	5	3:00
1995-03-20	Win	(Thailand) Prabibop Carryboy	Phettongkam, Rajadamnern Stadium	Bangkok, Thailand	Decision	5	3:00
1994-12-21	Win	(Thailand) Khaiwanthae Tor.Laksong	Rajadamnern Stadium 50th Anniversary	Bangkok, Thailand	Decision	5	3:00
1994-10-26	Loss	(Thailand) Yutthahat Sor.Narongchai	Mumnangoen, Rajadamnern Stadium	Bangkok, Thailand	Decision	5	3:00
1994-03-07	Win	(Thailand) Phansak Lukmatulee	Phettongkam, Rajadamnern Stadium	Bangkok, Thailand	TKO (Doctor stoppage)	4	
1994-01-05	Win	(Thailand) Pitichai Kiattipakpanang	Rajadamnern Stadium	Bangkok, Thailand	Decision	5	3:00
1993-	Win	(Thailand) Chainarat Kaewsamrit	Rajadamnern Stadium	Bangkok, Thailand	Decision	5	3:00
1993-	Win	(Thailand) Phanomsak Lukprabaht	Rajadamnern Stadium	Bangkok, Thailand	Decision	5	3:00
1993-	Loss	(Thailand) Rittidet Tor.Laksong	Rajadamnern Stadium	Bangkok, Thailand	Decision	5	3:00
1993-	Win	(Thailand) Prisna Kiatchansing	Rajadamnern Stadium	Bangkok, Thailand	Decision	5	3:00
1992-	Loss	(Thailand) Samransak Carryboy	Rajadamnern Stadium	Bangkok, Thailand	KO	1	
1992-	Win	(Thailand) Kotsranlek SkindiewGym	Rajadamnern Stadium	Bangkok, Thailand	Decision	5	3:00
Bangkok debut.
Legend: Win Loss Draw/No contest Notes
