= Parkpoom Jangphonak =

Thai boxer (born 1975)

Personal information
- Nickname: M
- Nationality: Thai
- Born: 7 October 1975 (age 50) Udon Thani Province, Thailand
- Height: 179 cm (5 ft 10 in)
- Weight: Welterweight; Junior middleweight Middleweight

Boxing career
- Reach: 180 cm (71 in)
- Stance: Southpaw

Boxing record
- Total fights: 12
- Wins: 9
- Win by KO: 5
- Losses: 3
- Draws: 0
- No contests: 0
Medal record
Men's amateur boxing
Representing Thailand
Thailand Amateur Boxing Championships
Gold medal – first place	1994	Welterweight
Royal Thai Armed Forces Games
Gold medal – first place	1997	Welterweight
Gold medal – first place	1998	Welterweight
King's Cup
Gold medal – first place	1997	Welterweight
Gold medal – first place	1998	Welterweight
Gold medal – first place	1999	Welterweight
President's Cup
Gold medal – first place	1997 Indonesia	Welterweight
Mare Cup
Gold medal – first place	1998 Philippines	Welterweight
Asian Games
Gold medal – first place	1998 Bangkok	Welterweight
Asian Amateur Boxing Championships
Gold medal – first place	1999 Tashkent	Welterweight
Carding Cup
Silver medal – second place	2000 Cuba	Welterweight

Parkpoom "M" Jangphonak (Thai: ภาคภูมิ แจ้งโพธิ์นาค; RTGS: Phakphum Chaengpho-nak; born 7 October 1975) is a retired Thai professional boxer in Welterweight division, in addition he is also an amateur boxer who has competed in the Olympic Games for two times and is a former Muay Thai kickboxer.

== Muay Thai & Amateur Boxing career ==
Parkpoom was born in Udon Thani Province, in the Isan region, which is also his father's hometown. Later, he moved to live and grow up in the Dan Samrong neighbourhood of Tambon Samrong Nuea, Mueang Samut Prakan District, Samut Prakan Province. His father, Yuthaphum Jangphonak, owns a boxing gym called "Panyuthaphum," which has trained many famous fighters such as Venice Borkhorsor, the WBC and Lineal Flyweight champion in the 1970s, and Langsuan Panyuthaphum, a renowned Muay Thai kickboxer in the 1980s. Since childhood, Parkpoom had the ambition to be the first Thai boxer to win an Olympic gold medal, inspired by Dhawee Umponmaha, a 1984 Olympics silver medalist in the Light welterweight division.

He started boxing at the age of nine through Muay Thai, regularly fighting at Samrong Stadium under the name "M16 Borkhorsor" (เอ็ม16 บ.ข.ส.), because he punched quickly like an M16 rifle.

In early 1996, he was persuaded to switch to amateur boxing. After only three months, he qualified as a Thai athlete for the 1996 Olympics in Atlanta in the Welterweight division. He earned his spot by fighting at Siam Om Noi Stadium in Om Noi, on the outskirts of Bangkok, during the undercard of a Muay Thai event that was regularly broadcast on Channel 3 at noon on Saturdays. He was considered the youngest and least experienced member of the Thai national team and had to compete in the first round. In the Round of 32, he lost to Serhiy Dzyndzyruk, a Ukrainian boxer, by a score of 10–20.

He continued amateur boxing and competed at the 13th Asian Games in late 1998 in Bangkok. There, he won the gold medal in the Welterweight division and was ranked number one in his weight class by AIBA.

At the 2000 Olympics in Sydney, Australia, he participated again in the amateur boxing tournament. He won the first round against Geard Ajetović, a Serbian boxer, with a tied score of 9–9, which was decided by the number of punches landed. In the second round, he lost to Serhiy Dotsenko, a Ukrainian boxer and future silver medalist, by a score of 5–13. Disappointed by the result, he retired from amateur boxing and switched to Taekwondo.

== Professional Boxing Career & Retirement ==
In 2003, he switched to professional boxing under Songchai Rattanasuban of Onesongchai Promotion. He won the PABA Welterweight title in his seventh fight in 2005, but after suffering three defeats in Australia and losing the title, he retired in 2007.

Parkpoom graduated with a bachelor's degree in communication arts from Thongsuk College and a master's degree in sports science from Srinakharinwirot University. After retirement, he opened a pet shop behind Seri Center in Bangkok. He is currently a lecturer at Udon Thani Rajabhat University and also serves as a boxing coach for the university's athletes.

== Muay Thai record ==
Muay Thai Record (Incomplete)
Date	Result	Opponent	Event	Location	Method	Round	Time
1995-07-17	Win	(Thailand) Saenkeng Pinsinchai	Rajadamnern Stadium	Bangkok, Thailand	Decision	5	3:00
1994-09-06	Win	(Thailand) Kongnapa Watcharawit	Lumpinee Stadium	Bangkok, Thailand	Decision	5	3:00
1994-07-27	Win	(Thailand) Saen Tor.Pranchai	Lumpinee Stadium	Bangkok, Thailand	Decision	5	3:00
1994-06-01	Loss	(Thailand) Kongnapa Watcharawit	Rajadamnern Stadium	Bangkok, Thailand	Decision	5	3:00
1994-05-13	Win	(Thailand) Buakaw Por.Pisichet	Lumpinee Stadium	Bangkok, Thailand	Decision	5	3:00
1994-02-18	Win	(Thailand) Suwitlek Sor.Sakowarat	Lumpinee Stadium	Bangkok, Thailand	Decision	5	3:00
1993-12-07	Loss	(Thailand) Noppadet Sor.Rewadee	Rajadamnern Stadium	Bangkok, Thailand	Decision	5	3:00
1993-11-25	Loss	(Thailand) Pepsi Biyapan	Lumpinee Stadium	Bangkok, Thailand	Decision	5	3:00
1993-09-10	Win	(Thailand) Phanomrung Sitsarawat	Lumpinee Stadium	Bangkok, Thailand	Decision	5	3:00
1993-07-20	Loss	(Thailand) Kangwannoi Or.Sribualoi	Lumpinee Stadium	Bangkok, Thailand	Decision	5	3:00
1993-06-22	Loss	(Thailand) Kangwannoi Or.Sribualoi	Lumpinee Stadium	Bangkok, Thailand	Decision	5	3:00
1993-04-27	Win	(Thailand) Changnoi Srimongkol	Lumpinee Stadium	Bangkok, Thailand	Decision	5	3:00
1993-02-16	Win	(Thailand) Charoenchai Sitsothon	Lumpinee Stadium	Bangkok, Thailand	KO (Punches)	3	
1993-01-15	Win	(Thailand) Kangwannoi Or.Sribualoi	Lumpinee Stadium	Bangkok, Thailand	Decision	5	3:00
Legend: Win Loss Draw/No contest Notes

== See also ==
- Thailand at the 1996 Summer Olympics
- Thailand at the 1998 Asian Games
- Thailand at the 2000 Summer Olympics
