= Dokmaipa Por.Pongsawang =

Thai professional Muay Thai fighter (1968–2020)

- Dokmaipa in the 1980s or 1990s
- Born: Chamnien Moonkasorn; May 16, 1968; Roi Et, Thailand
- Died: October 7, 2020 (aged 52); Kalasin, Thailand
- Native name: จำเนียร มูลเกษร
- Other names: The Powerful Southpaw (ซ้ายตกขอบ)
- Division: Mini Flyweight; Light Flyweight; Flyweight; Super Flyweight; Bantamweight
- Style: Muay Thai (Muay Tae)
- Stance: Southpaw
- Team: Por.Pongsawang Gym
- Years active: c. 1977–1997

Professional boxing record
- Total: 2
- Wins: 1
- Losses: 1

Other information
- Notable relatives: Tukatathong Por.Pongsawang (younger brother); Detduang Por.Pongsawang (older brother)
- Boxing record from BoxRec

Chamnien Moonkasorn (Thai: จำเนียร มูลเกษร; May 16, 1968 - October 7, 2020), known professionally as Dokmaipa Por.Pongsawang (Thai: ดอกไม้ป่า ป.พงษ์สว่าง), was a Thai professional Muay Thai fighter. He was a two-division Lumpinee Stadium champion who was famous in the 1980s and 1990s. Nicknamed "The Powerful Southpaw", he was especially known for his devastating left kicks.

== Biography & career ==
Chamnien Moonkasorn was born in 1968 in the Selaphum district, Roi Et province where he started Muay Thai training at the age of 9. He fought for the Kiatbanhan gym under the name Detduangnoi Kiatbanhan until the age of 12 when he joined the Por.Pongsawang camp in Bangkok alongside his brothers Tukatathong and Detduang.

Dokmaipa debuted in the major Bangkokg stadiums at the age of 16. He rapidly became a notable champion known for his powerful left leg under the Onesongchai promotion. He won the Lumpinee Stadium titles in the 112 lbs and 115 lbs divisions in 1987 and 1988, defeating champions Burklerk Pinsinchai, Wisanupon Saksamut and Wangchannoi Sor Palangchai.

At his peak he received purses of more than 120,000 baht. Some of the most notable opponents he defeated were Paruhatlek Sitchunthong, Boonlai Sor.Thanikul, Oley Kiatoneway, Karuhat Sor.Supawan, Nungubon Sitlerchai, Yodkhunpon Sitraipum, Saenklai Sit Kru Od and Kaensak Sor.Ploenjit.

After his fighting career Dokmaipa spent years as a trainer in Macao before returning to live in his native province. On October 6, 2020, Dokmaipa was brought to the hospital following blood infection symptoms caused by a centipede wound. He fell into a coma and was pronounced dead on October 7, 2020, at the Kalasin province Hospital.

== Titles ==
- Lumpinee Stadium
  - 1987 Lumpinee Stadium Flyweight (112 lbs) Champion
    - One successful title defense
  - 1988 Lumpinee Stadium Super Flyweight (115 lbs) Champion

== Fight record ==
Kickboxing record
Date	Result	Opponent	Event	Location	Method	Round	Time
1998-	Loss	(Thailand) Tor Patak Wanchalerm	Lumpinee Stadium	Bangkok, Thailand	TKO (Low kicks)		
1997-08-26	Loss	(Thailand) Singdam Or.Ukrit	Lumpinee Stadium	Bangkok, Thailand	Decision	5	3:00
1996-09-27	Win	(Thailand) Wanpichit Romachiphum	Lumpinee Stadium	Bangkok, Thailand	KO (Punches)	3	
1996-03-05	Win	(Thailand) Baiphet Lookjaomaesaiware	Lumpinee Stadium	Bangkok, Thailand	TKO	3	
1996-02-	Loss	(Thailand) Baiphet Lookjaomaesaiware	Lumpinee Stadium	Bangkok, Thailand	Decision	5	3:00
1996-01-16	Loss	(Thailand) Baiphet Lookjaomaesaiware	Lumpinee Stadium	Bangkok, Thailand	Decision	5	3:00
1995-11-17	Win	(Thailand) Dao Udon Sor.Suchart	Lumpinee Stadium	Bangkok, Thailand	Decision	5	3:00
1995-09-30	Win	(Thailand) Nungubon Sitlerchai	Lumpinee Stadium	Bangkok, Thailand	Decision	5	3:00
1995-08-25	Loss	(Thailand) Karuhat Sor.Supawan	Lumpinee Stadium	Bangkok, Thailand	Decision	5	3:00
1995-06-30	Loss	(Thailand) Nungubon Sitlerchai	Lumpinee Stadium	Bangkok, Thailand	Decision	5	3:00
1995-06-09	Win	(Thailand) Kaensak Sor.Ploenjit	Lumpinee Stadium	Bangkok, Thailand	Decision	5	3:00
1995-04-28	Win	(Thailand) Sornsuknoi Sakwichan	Lumpinee Stadium	Bangkok, Thailand	Decision	5	3:00
1995-03-10	Win	(Thailand) Saenchai Kiatsupattra	Lumpinee Stadium	Bangkok, Thailand	KO (High kick)	2	
1994-11-08	Loss	(Thailand) Jaoweha Looktapfah	Lumpinee Stadium	Bangkok, Thailand	Decision	5	3:00
1994-08-30	Loss	(Thailand) Daraek Sitkrungsap	Lumpinee Stadium	Bangkok, Thailand	Decision	5	3:00
1994-08-05	Loss	(Thailand) Daraek Sitkrungsap	Lumpinee Stadium	Bangkok, Thailand	Decision	5	3:00
1994-05-17	Loss	(Thailand) Singdam Or.Ukrit	Lumpinee Stadium	Bangkok, Thailand	Decision	5	3:00
1994-03-05		(Thailand) Baiphet Lookjaomaesaiware	Lumpinee Stadium	Bangkok, Thailand	Decision	5	3:00
1994-01-06	Loss	(Thailand) Veeraphol Sahaprom	Rajadamnern Stadium	Bangkok, Thailand	Decision	5	3:00
1993-11-05	Loss	(Thailand) Anantasak Panyuthaphum	Lumpinee Stadium	Bangkok, Thailand	KO (Left cross)	2	
1993-10-15	Win	(Thailand) Saenklai SitKruOd	Lumpinee Stadium	Bangkok, Thailand	Decision	5	3:00
1993-08-16	Win	(Thailand) Burklerk Pinsinchai	Rajadamnern Stadium	Bangkok, Thailand	Decision	5	3:00
1993-05-17	Loss	(Thailand) Saenkeng Pinsinchai	Rajadamnern Stadium	Bangkok, Thailand	Decision	5	3:00
1993-03-03	Win	(Thailand) Yodkhunpon Sitraipum	Rajadamnern Stadium	Bangkok, Thailand	Decision	5	3:00
1993-02-06	Loss	(Thailand) Lakhin Wassandasit	Lumpinee Stadium	Bangkok, Thailand	Decision	5	3:00
1993-01-08	Loss	(Thailand) Lakhin Wassandasit	Lumpinee Stadium	Bangkok, Thailand	Decision	5	3:00
1992-12-27	Loss	(Thailand) Oley Kiatoneway	Lumpinee Stadium	Bangkok, Thailand	Decision	5	3:00
1992-12-10	Win	(Thailand) Pompetch Naratreekul	Lumpinee Stadium	Bangkok, Thailand	Decision	5	3:00
1992-	Loss	(Thailand) Jaroensap Kiatbanchong	Lumpinee Stadium	Bangkok, Thailand	Decision	5	3:00
1992-	NC	(Thailand) Nungubon Sitlerchai	Lumpinee Stadium	Bangkok, Thailand			
1992-07-27	Loss	(Thailand) Kaensak Sor.Ploenjit	Rajadamnern Stadium	Bangkok, Thailand	Decision	5	3:00
1992-05-05	Loss	(Thailand) Veeraphol Sahaprom	Lumpinee Stadium	Bangkok, Thailand	Decision	5	3:00
1992-03-10	Win	(Thailand) Nungubon Sitlerchai	Lumpinee Stadium	Bangkok, Thailand	Decision	5	3:00
1992-02-28	Win	(France) Josselin Christophe	Crocodile Farm	Samut Prakan, Thailand	Decision	5	3:00
1992-01-31	Win	(Thailand) Nungubon Sitlerchai	Lumpinee Stadium	Bangkok, Thailand	Decision	5	3:00
1991-12-27	Loss	(Thailand) Oley Kiatoneway	Lumpinee Stadium	Bangkok, Thailand	Decision	5	3:00
1991-10-25	Loss	(Thailand) Thanooin Chor.Chuchart	Lumpinee Stadium	Bangkok, Thailand	Decision	5	3:00
1991-09-24	Loss	(Thailand) Boonlai Sor.Thanikul	Lumpinee Stadium	Bangkok, Thailand	Decision	5	3:00
1991-09-03	Win	(Thailand) Jaroensap Kiatbanchong	Lumpinee Stadium	Bangkok, Thailand	Decision	5	3:00
1991-07-16	Loss	(Thailand) Jongsanan Bangkaewluklong	Lumpinee Stadium	Bangkok, Thailand	Decision	5	3:00
1991-05-10	Win	(Thailand) Chainoi Muangsurin	Lumpinee Stadium	Bangkok, Thailand	Decision	5	3:00
1991-03-31	Win	(Thailand) Nungubon Sitlerchai	Lumpinee Stadium	Bangkok, Thailand	Decision	5	3:00
1991-03-05	Loss	(Thailand) Langsuan Panyuthaphum	Lumpinee Stadium	Bangkok, Thailand	Decision	5	3:00
1991-01-25	Win	(Thailand) Karuhat Sor.Supawan	Lumpinee Stadium	Bangkok, Thailand	Decision	5	3:00
1991-01-04	Loss	(Thailand) Namkabuan Nongkeepahuyuth	Lumpinee Stadium	Bangkok, Thailand	Decision	5	3:00
1990-12-11	Win	(Thailand) Rainbow Sor.Prantalay	Lumpinee Stadium	Bangkok, Thailand	TKO	4	
1990-11-20	Loss	(Thailand) Wangchannoi Sor.Palangchai	Lumpinee Stadium	Bangkok, Thailand	Decision	5	3:00
1990-10-30	Win	(Thailand) Samranthong Kiatbanchong	Lumpinee Stadium	Bangkok, Thailand	TKO (Punches)	2	
1990-09-25	Loss	(Thailand) Oley Kiatoneway	Lumpinee Stadium	Bangkok, Thailand	Decision	5	3:00
1990-08-07	Loss	(Thailand) Oley Kiatoneway	Lumpinee Stadium	Bangkok, Thailand	KO	3	
1990-07-10	Win	(Thailand) Oley Kiatoneway	Lumpinee Stadium	Bangkok, Thailand	Decision	5	3:00
1990-06-	Win	(France) Joel Cesar		England	KO	1	
1990-05-15	Win	(Thailand) Boonlai Sor.Thanikul	Lumpinee Stadium	Bangkok, Thailand	Decision	5	3:00
1990-04-24	Loss	(Thailand) Kangwannoi Or.Sribualoi	Lumpinee Stadium	Bangkok, Thailand	Decision	5	3:00
1990-03-30	Win	(Thailand) Boonlong Sor.Thanikul	Lumpinee Stadium	Bangkok, Thailand	Decision	5	3:00
1990-03-02	Win	(Thailand) Saichon Pichitsuk	Lumpinee Stadium	Bangkok, Thailand	Decision	5	3:00
1990-02-03	Win	(England) Leroy Atkinson		London, England	KO	3	
1990-01-20	Loss	(Thailand) Kangwannoi Or.Sribualoi	Lumpinee Stadium	Bangkok, Thailand	Decision	5	3:00
1989-11-11	Win	(Netherlands) Tekin Donmez		Phoenix, Arizona, United States	Decision	5	3:00
1989-10-17	Loss	(Thailand) Saichon Pichitsuk	Lumpinee Stadium	Bangkok, Thailand	Decision	5	3:00
1989-09-21	Loss	(Thailand) Santos Devy	Rajadamnern Stadium	Bangkok, Thailand	Decision	5	3:00
1989-08-15	Loss	(Thailand) Superlek Sornisaan	Lumpinee Stadium	Bangkok, Thailand	Decision	5	3:00
1989-06-30	Win	(Thailand) Grandprixnoi Muangchaiyaphum	Lumpinee Stadium	Bangkok, Thailand	Decision	5	3:00
1989-06-06	Win	(Thailand) Yodpetch Sor.Jitpattana	Lumpinee Stadium	Bangkok, Thailand	Decision	5	3:00
1989-05-02	Loss	(Thailand) Langsuan Panyuthaphum	Lumpinee Stadium	Bangkok, Thailand	Decision	5	3:00
Loses the Lumpinee Stadium Super Flyweight (115 lbs) title.
1989-03-10	Loss	(Thailand) Noppadet Sor.Rewadee	Lumpinee Stadium	Bangkok, Thailand	Decision	5	3:00
1989-01-31	Loss	(Thailand) Samransak Muangsurin	Lumpinee Stadium	Bangkok, Thailand	Decision	5	3:00
1988-12-08	Win	(Thailand) Phodam Chuwattana	Rajadamnern Stadium	Bangkok, Thailand	Decision	5	3:00
1988-10-28	Win	(Thailand) Thamawit Saksamut	Lumpinee Stadium	Bangkok, Thailand	Decision	5	3:00
1988-09-27	Loss	(Thailand) Kongtoranee Payakaroon	Lumpinee Stadium	Bangkok, Thailand	Decision	5	3:00
1988-07-26	Loss	(Thailand) Langsuan Panyuthaphum	Lumpinee Stadium	Bangkok, Thailand	Decision	5	3:00
1988-05-31	Win	(Thailand) Wisanupon Saksamut	Lumpinee Stadium	Bangkok, Thailand	TKO (Corner Stoppage)	4	
Wins the Lumpinee Stadium Super Flyweight (115 lbs) title.
1988-01-26	Win	(Thailand) Wangchannoi Sor.Palangchai	Lumpinee Stadium	Bangkok, Thailand	Decision	5	3:00
Defends the Lumpinee Stadium Flyweight (112 lbs) title.
1987-11-27	Loss	(Thailand) Wangchannoi Sor.Palangchai	Lumpinee Stadium	Bangkok, Thailand	KO (Punches)		
1987-10-	Draw	(Thailand) Baeber Narupai	Lumpinee Stadium	Bangkok, Thailand	Decision	5	3:00
1987-09-22	Loss	(Thailand) Langsuan Panyuthaphum	Lumpinee Stadium	Bangkok, Thailand	Decision	5	3:00
1987-08-28	Win	(Thailand) Burklerk Pinsinchai	Lumpinee Stadium	Bangkok, Thailand	Decision	5	3:00
Wins the Lumpinee Stadium Super Flyweight (115 lbs) title.
1987-07-24	Win	(Thailand) Paruhatlek Sitchunthong	Lumpinee Stadium	Bangkok, Thailand	Decision	5	3:00
1987-05-19	Win	(Thailand) Eddie Siwatsiripong	Lumpinee Stadium	Bangkok, Thailand	Decision	5	3:00
1987-03-24	Win	(Thailand) Pungluang Kiatanan	Lumpinee Stadium	Bangkok, Thailand	Decision	5	3:00
1987-03-	Win	(Thailand) Supernoi Sitchokchai		Udon Thani, Thailand	KO	4	
1987-02-10	Win	(Thailand) Pungluang Kiatanan	Lumpinee Stadium	Bangkok, Thailand	Decision	5	3:00
1987-01-13	Loss	(Thailand) Hippy Singmanee	Lumpinee Stadium	Bangkok, Thailand	Decision	5	3:00
1986-12-10	Win	(Thailand) Bookerd Fairtex	Huamark Stadium	Bangkok, Thailand	Decision	5	3:00
1986-10-24	Win	(Thailand) Morakot Sor.Tamarangsri	Lumpinee Stadium	Bangkok, Thailand	Decision	5	3:00
1986-09-30	Win	(Thailand) Morakot Sor.Tamarangsri	Lumpinee Stadium	Bangkok, Thailand	Decision	5	3:00
1986-09-09	Loss	(Thailand) Hippy Singmanee	Lumpinee Stadium	Bangkok, Thailand	Decision	5	3:00
For a 160,000 baht side-bet.
1986-07-30	Loss	(Thailand) Jaroenthong Kiatbanchong	Lumpinee Stadium	Bangkok, Thailand	Decision	5	3:00
1986-07-11	Win	(Thailand) Saeksan Sitjomthong	Lumpinee Stadium	Bangkok, Thailand	Decision	5	3:00
1986-06-03	Win	(Thailand) Saeksan Sitjomthong	Lumpinee Stadium	Bangkok, Thailand	Decision	5	3:00
1986-03-28	Win	(Thailand) Wanthongchai Payasakda	Lumpinee Stadium	Bangkok, Thailand	KO	4	
1986-03-04	Loss	(Thailand) Haodong Sor.Tassanee	Lumpinee Stadium	Bangkok, Thailand	Decision	5	3:00
1986-01-31	Win	(Thailand) Boonthieng Bualuangprakanp̣hay	Lumpinee Stadium	Bangkok, Thailand	Decision	5	3:00
1985-10-18	Loss	(Thailand) Boonmee Sitsuchon	Lumpinee Stadium	Bangkok, Thailand	Decision	5	3:00
1985-09-20	Loss	(Thailand) Pairojnoi Sor.Siamchai	Lumpinee Stadium	Bangkok, Thailand	Decision	5	3:00
1985-06-22	Win	(Thailand) Boonmee Sitsuchon	Lumpinee Stadium	Bangkok, Thailand	Decision	5	3:00
Wins 200,000 baht side-bet.
1985-05-21	Win	(Thailand) Boonmee Sitsuchon	Lumpinee Stadium	Bangkok, Thailand	Decision	5	3:00
Wins 200,000 baht side-bet.
1985-04-26	Loss	(Thailand) Kley Sor.Ploenchit	Lumpinee Stadium	Bangkok, Thailand	Decision	5	3:00
For a 100,000 baht side-bet.
1985-03-30	Win	(Thailand) Hanunoi Sor.Ploenchit	Lumpinee Stadium	Bangkok, Thailand	Decision	5	3:00
1985-02-22	Win	(Thailand) Kittichai Sor.Ploenchit	Lumpinee Stadium	Bangkok, Thailand	Decision	5	3:00
1985-01-11	Win	(Thailand) Supermin Kiatwangkham	Lumpinee Stadium	Bangkok, Thailand	Decision	5	3:00
Wins 200,000 baht side-bet.
1984-12-04	Win	(Thailand) Pansuriya Hor.Mahachai		Bangkok, Thailand	Decision	5	3:00
Wins 90,000 baht side-bet.
1984-11-03	Win	(Thailand) Theppabut Luktafah		Bangkok, Thailand	Decision	5	3:00
Wins 80,000 baht side-bet.
1984-10-12	Win	(Thailand) Liktisit Sor.Jitpattana		Bangkok, Thailand	Decision	5	3:00
1984-09-04	Win	(Thailand) Winainoi Chor.Wichannoi		Bangkok, Thailand	Decision	5	3:00
Legend: Win Loss Draw/No contest Notes
