= Anantasak Panyuthaphum =

Thai professional Muay Thai fighter and boxer

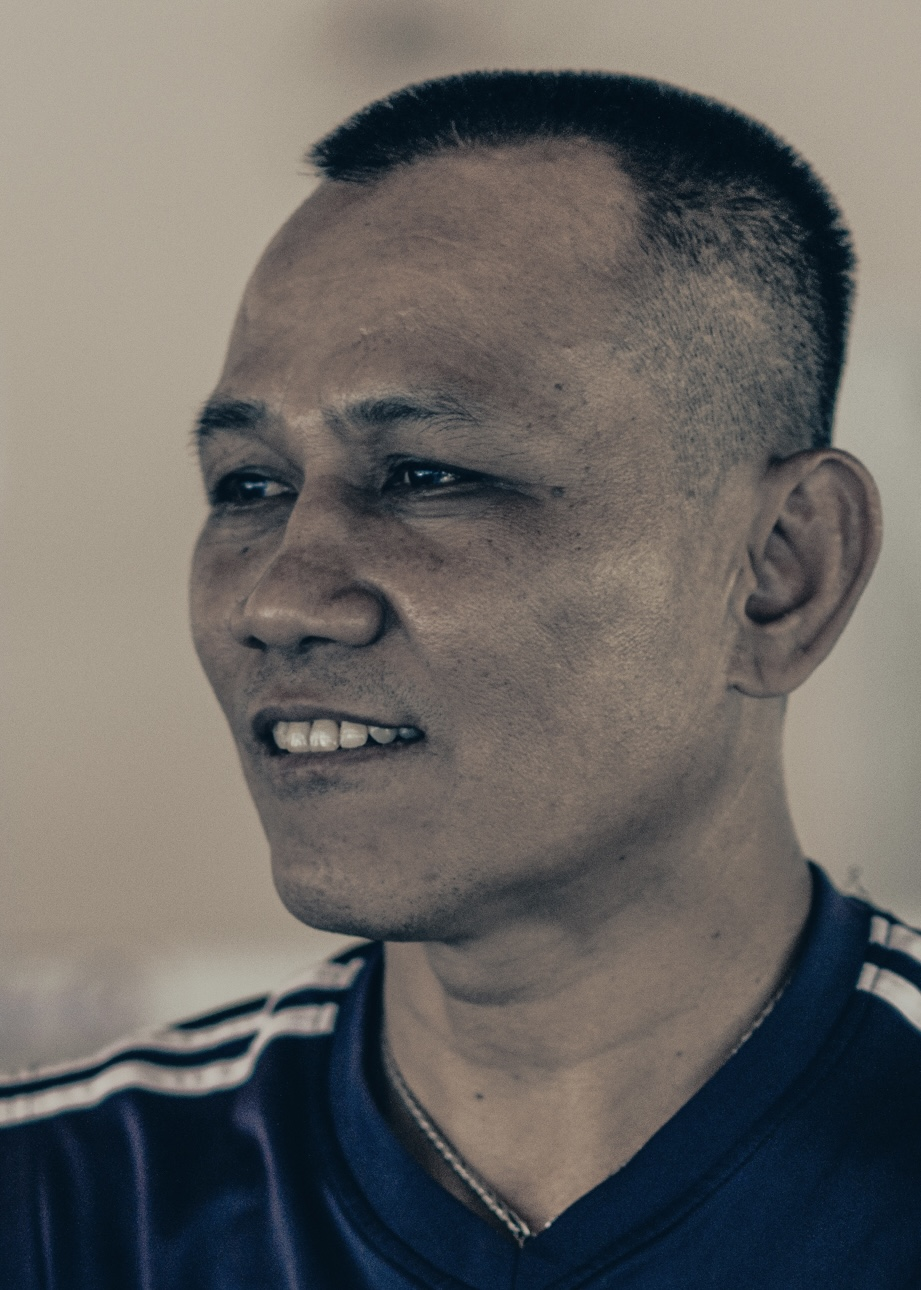
- Anantasak in 2024
- Born: Suttisak Samaksaman; August 7, 1973 (age 53); Surin, Thailand
- Native name: สุทธิศักดิ์ สมัครสมาน
- Nickname: Flying Axe Elbow (ไอ้ศอกขวานบิน)
- Height: 170 cm (5 ft 7 in)
- Division: Super Flyweight; Bantamweight; Super Bantamweight; Featherweight; Super Featherweight
- Style: Muay Thai (Muay Femur / Muay Sok)
- Stance: Southpaw
- Team: Panyuthapum Gym
- Years active: c. 1982–1998

Professional boxing record
- Total: 7
- Wins: 6
- By knockout: 0
- Losses: 1
- By knockout: 1

Other information
- University: Institute of Physical Education, Sukhothai
- Notable club: Royal Thai Army (RTA)
- Boxing record from BoxRec

Suttisak Samaksaman (Thai: สุทธิศักดิ์ สมัครสมาน; born August 7, 1973), known professionally as Anantasak Panyuthapum (Thai: อนันตศักดิ์ พันธ์ยุทธภูมิ), is a Thai former professional Muay Thai fighter and boxer. He was the 1997 Sports Writers Association of Thailand Fighter of the Year.

== Biography & career ==
Anantasak Panyuthapum born as Suttisak Samaksaman (สุทธิศักดิ์ สมัครสมาน) in Mueang Surin District (later separated into Tambon Prasat Thong and Khwao Sinarin District), Surin Province, lower northeastern Thailand. He started Muay Thai at the age of 9 in his native province of Surin. He later joined the Panyuthapum gym in Samut Prakan where he received his ring name.

At the peak of his career Anantasak had a 180,000 baht purse and was considering one of the most dangerous elbow fighters. Nicknamed the "Flying Axe Elbow", a lot of his opponents finished fights with a bloody face. During his career he defeated many notable champions such as Saenklai Sit Kru Od, Yodkhunpon Sittraiphum, Dokmaipa Por.Pongsawang, Singdam Or.Ukrit, Padejseuk Kiatsamran, Muangfahlek Kiatwichian, and Chutin Por.Tawachai.

In amateur boxing he participated for the first time in the Thailand Championships in Nakhon Sawan at Lightweight (-60 kg) class. In the final, he lost to Somchai Nakbalee, after this experience, he was competing in the Featherweight (-57 kg) division. He continued to fight until he was selected for the national team, but he was only the substitute for the first Thai Summer Olympics gold medalist Somluck Kamsing. Although being known as a heavy puncher, he had fought with Kamsing twice, losing both due to the agility of Kamsing.

After his fighting career Anantasak became a boxing instructor in the Royal Thai Army (RTA).

== Titles and accomplishments ==
=== Muay Thai ===
- Siam Omnoi Stadium
  - 1997 Omnoi Stadium Featherweight (126 lbs) Champion
    - One successful title defense
  - 1997 7th Isuzu Cup Tournament Winner
- World Muaythai Council
  - 1997 WMC World Super Bantamweight (122 lbs) Champion
- Awards
  - 1997 Sports Writers Association of Thailand Fighter of the Year

=== Boxing ===
- Asian Amateur Boxing Championships
  - 1999 Asian Amateur Boxing Championships Bronze Medalist at Featherweight (57 kg)
  - 1999 Asian Amateur Boxing Championships Silver Medalist at Featherweight (57 kg)
- Pan Asian Boxing Association
  - 2005 PABA Super Featherweight (130 lbs) Champion

== Fight record ==
Muay Thai Record (Incomplete)
Date	Result	Opponent	Event	Location	Method	Round	Time
1998-12-23	Loss	(Thailand) Muangfahlek Kiatwichian	Rajadamnern Stadium	Bangkok, Thailand	Decision	5	3:00
1998-	Win	(Thailand) Neungsiam Kiatwichian	Channel 7 Stadium	Bangkok, Thailand	Decision	5	3:00
1998-10-23	Loss	(Thailand) Itthidet Sor.Sukontip	Phairanan, Rajadamnern Stadium	Bangkok, Thailand	Decision	5	3:00
1998-	Win	(Thailand) Muangfahlek Kiatwichian	Rajadamnern Stadium	Bangkok, Thailand	Decision	5	3:00
1998-	Win	(Thailand) Donking Kiatpayathai	Omnoi Stadium	Samut Sakhon, Thailand	TKO	3	
1998-05-09	Win	(Thailand) Ittidet Sor.Boonya	Omnoi Stadium	Samut Sakhon, Thailand	KO (left elbow)	5	
Defends the Omnoi Stadium Featherweight (126 lbs) title.
1998-03-31	Win	(Thailand) Thanongsak Sit.Or	Petchyindee, Lumpinee Stadium	Bangkok, Thailand	Decision	5	3:00
1998-03-03	Win	(Thailand) Singsarawat 13CoinsTower	Lumpinee Stadium	Bangkok, Thailand	Decision	5	3:00
1998-01-30	Win	(Thailand) Neungsiam Kiatwichian	Kiatphet, Lumpinee Stadium	Bangkok, Thailand	Decision	5	3:00
1997-12-20	Win	(Thailand) Phetnamek Sor.Siriwat	Omnoi Stadium	Samut Sakhon, Thailand	KO (left elbow)	4	
1997-12-20	Win	(Thailand) Phetnamek Sor.Siriwat	Lumpinee Stadium	Bangkok, Thailand	Decision	5	3:00
1997-06-24	Win	(Thailand) Saenklai SitKruOd	Petchyindee, Lumpinee Stadium	Bangkok, Thailand	KO	3	
Wins the WMC World Super Bantamweight (122 lbs) title.
1997-04-26	Win	(Thailand) Singdam Or.Ukrit	Omnoi Stadium - Isuzu Cup Final	Samut Sakhon, Thailand	Decision	5	3:00
Wins the 7th Isuzu Cup Tournament and Omnoi Stadium Featherweight (126 lbs) title.
1997-02-01	Win	(Thailand) Changnoi Sirimongkol	Omnoi Stadium - Isuzu Cup Semi Final	Samut Sakhon, Thailand	KO (left hook)	4	
1996-12-21	Win	(Thailand) Chutin Por.Tawachai	Omnoi Stadium - Isuzu Cup	Samut Sakhon, Thailand	Decision	5	3:00
1996-11-09	Win	(Thailand) Saenklai SitKruOd	Omnoi Stadium - Isuzu Cup	Samut Sakhon, Thailand	Decision	5	3:00
1996-09-28	Win	(Thailand) Komkiat Sor.Thanikul	Omnoi Stadium - Isuzu Cup	Samut Sakhon, Thailand	Decision	5	3:00
1996-08-16	NC	(Thailand) Auttapon Sor.Wandee	Lumpinee Stadium	Bangkok, Thailand	Dismissal	5	
Anantasak was dismissed by the referee for not fighting up to his abilities. It was later revealed he was injured.
1996-04-24	Win	(Thailand) Kukrit Sor.Nayaiam	Lumpinee Stadium	Bangkok, Thailand	TKO (knees)	5	
1996-04-08	Loss	(Thailand) Namtaothong Sor.Sirikul	Lumpinee Stadium	Bangkok, Thailand	Decision	5	3:00
1996-03-22	Win	(Thailand) Dara-ek Sitrungsap	Lumpinee Stadium	Bangkok, Thailand	KO (left cross)	2	
1995-11-14	Win	(Thailand) Watcharalek Wongwianyaiplaza	Lumpinee Stadium	Bangkok, Thailand	KO (left uppercut)	3	
1995-10-06	Loss	(Thailand) Chaidet Kiatchansing	Lumpinee Stadium	Bangkok, Thailand	Decision	5	3:00
1995-09-15	Win	(Thailand) Kacha Manwud	Petchyindee, Lumpinee Stadium	Bangkok, Thailand	KO (left elbow)	3	
1995-08-11	Loss	(Thailand) Watcharalek Wongwianyaiplaza	Lumpinee Stadium	Bangkok, Thailand	KO (left high kick)	3	
1995-07-14	Win	(Thailand) Watcharalek Wongwianyaiplaza	Lumpinee Stadium	Bangkok, Thailand	Decision	5	3:00
1995-05-03	Win	(Thailand) Puja Damrongsakgym	Rajadamnern Stadium	Bangkok, Thailand	Decision	5	3:00
1995-03-31	Loss	(Thailand) Muangfahlek Kiatwichian	Lumpinee Stadium	Bangkok, Thailand	Decision	5	3:00
1995-02-23	Win	(Thailand) Muangfahlek Kiatwichian	Daorungchucharoen, Lumpinee Stadium	Bangkok, Thailand	Decision	5	3:00
1995-01-20	Loss	(Thailand) Saenklai SitKruOd	Lumpinee Stadium	Bangkok, Thailand	Decision	5	3:00
1994-10-18	Win	(Thailand) Jaowayha Looktubfah	Lumpinee Stadium	Bangkok, Thailand	Decision	5	3:00
1994-09-16	Win	(Thailand) Jaowayha Looktubfah	Lumpinee Stadium	Bangkok, Thailand	Decision	5	3:00
1994-07-05	Loss	(Thailand) Dara-ek Sitrungsap	Petchyindee, Lumpinee Stadium	Bangkok, Thailand	TKO (shin injury)	3	
1994-05-06	Win	(Thailand) Padejseuk Kiatsamran	Lumpinee Stadium	Bangkok, Thailand	TKO (doctor stoppage)	2	
1994-04-08	Win	(Thailand) Saichon Ploysakda	Lumpinee Stadium	Bangkok, Thailand	KO (left uppercut)	3	
1994-02-22	Win	(Thailand) Thabtimsiam Por.Nittirat	Lumpinee Stadium	Bangkok, Thailand	Decision	5	3:00
1994-01-21	Win	(Thailand) Thabtimsiam Por.Nittirat	Lumpinee Stadium	Bangkok, Thailand	Decision	5	3:00
Wins 1 million baht side-bet.
1993-12-07	Loss	(Thailand) Saenklai SitKruOd	Lumpinee Stadium	Bangkok, Thailand	Decision	5	3:00
For the Lumpinee Stadium Bantamweight (118 lbs) title.
1993-11-05	Win	(Thailand) Dokmaipa Por.Pongsawang	Lumpinee Stadium	Bangkok, Thailand	KO (left cross)	2	
1993-10-15	Win	(Thailand) Singdam Or.Ukrit	Lumpinee Stadium	Bangkok, Thailand	TKO (doctor stoppage)	3	
1993-09-14	Win	(Thailand) Singdam Or.Ukrit	Lumpinee Stadium	Bangkok, Thailand	TKO (doctor stoppage)	4	
1993-08-10	Win	(Thailand) Kengkat Kiatkamthorn	Lumpinee Stadium	Bangkok, Thailand	Decision	5	3:00
1993-07-24	Win	(Thailand) Changnoi Sirimongkol	Lumpinee Stadium	Bangkok, Thailand	Decision	5	3:00
1993-06-22	Win	(Thailand) Dara-ek Sitrungsap	Lumpinee Stadium	Bangkok, Thailand	Decision	5	3:00
1993-05-22	Loss	(Thailand) Changnoi Sirimongkol	Omnoi Stadium	Samut Sakhon, Thailand	Decision	5	3:00
1993-04-25	Win	(Thailand) Klaikangwan Or.Sribualoi	Lumpinee Stadium	Bangkok, Thailand	Decision	5	3:00
1993-04-02	Loss	(Thailand) Saenklai SitKruOd	Lumpinee Stadium	Bangkok, Thailand	Decision	5	3:00
1993-03-12	Win	(Thailand) Yodkhunpon Sittraiphum	Lumpinee Stadium	Bangkok, Thailand	KO	2	
1993-01-22	Win	(Thailand) Phansak Sor.Boonya	Lumpinee Stadium	Bangkok, Thailand	Decision	5	3:00
1992-12-15	Win	(Thailand) Thongsabad Biyaphan	Lumpinee Stadium	Bangkok, Thailand	KO	2	
1992-11-17	Loss	(Thailand) Prakatsuk Kiatmuangtrang	Lumpinee Stadium	Bangkok, Thailand	Decision	5	3:00
1992-10-06	Win	(Thailand) Suanthong Muangmaptaphut	Lumpinee Stadium	Bangkok, Thailand	Decision	5	3:00
1992-09-03	Win	(Thailand) Phetratae Sit A. Lapploi	Rajadamnern Stadium	Bangkok, Thailand	KO	1	
1992-01-03	Loss	(Thailand) Phanomrung Sitbanchong	Lumpinee Stadium	Bangkok, Thailand	Decision	5	3:00
1991-11-29	Loss	(Thailand) Jaroensak Kiatnakornchon	Petchyindee, Lumpinee Stadium	Bangkok, Thailand	Decision	5	3:00
1991-10-01	Win	(Thailand) Wangkhon Por.Muangyang	Lumpinee Stadium	Bangkok, Thailand	KO (right hook)	2	
1991-05-24	Loss	(Thailand) Suriya Chor.Wiko	Lumpinee Stadium	Bangkok, Thailand	KO (punch)	3	
1991-04-26	Win	(Thailand) Lamphoonnoi Kiatsomsak	Lumpinee Stadium	Bangkok, Thailand	KO	4	
Legend: Win Loss Draw/No contest Notes

== Professional boxing record ==
7 fights	6 wins	1 loss
By knockout	0	1
By decision	6	0

No.	Result	Record	Opponent	Type	Round, time	Date	Location	Notes
7	Loss	7-1	Jun Paderna	KO	1 (12), 2:30	10 Feb 2006	Ubon Ratchathani, Thailand	Loses the PABA featherweight title
6	Win	7-0	Jun Paderna	UD	12	17 Nov 2005	Chai Nat, Thailand	Wins the PABA featherweight title
5	Win	6-0	Rudy Tacoque	UD	6	15 July 2005	Omnoi Stadium, Samut Sakhon, Thailand	
4	Win	5-0	Arnel Porras	UD	8	30 May 2005	Channel 7 Studios, Bangkok, Thailand	
3	Win	4-0	Jerome Arsolon	UD	8	2 Nov 2004	Ubon Ratchathani, Thailand	
2	Win	3-0	Julius Tarona	UD	8	17 Sep 2004	Ratanaburi, Surin, Thailand	
1	Win	1-0	Carlo Deligel	UD	8	9 July 2004	Sadao, Thailand	
