= Pongsith Wiangwiset =

Thai boxer (born 1972)

Personal information
- Native name: พงษ์สิทธิ์ เวียงวิเศษ
- Nickname: Kai
- Nationality: Thai
- Born: 22 January 1972 (age 54) Mueang Khon Kaen District, Khon Kaen Province, Isan (Northeast Thailand)
- Years active: 1991–2005
- Height: 165 cm (5 ft 5 in)
- Weight: 58 kg (128 lb; 9.1 st)

Sport
- Country: Thailand
- Sport: Boxing; Muay Thai
- Team: Songchai Boxing Promotion
- Turned pro: 2002
- Retired: 2005
Medal record
Amateur Boxing
Representing Thailand
SEA Games
Gold medal – first place	1995 Chiang Mai	Lightweight
Asian Games
Gold medal – first place	1998 Bangkok	Lightweight
Asian Amateur Boxing Championships
Bronze medal – third place	1997 Kuala Lumpur	Lightweight

Pongsith Wiangwiset (born 22 January 1972) also known as Wanwiset Kaennorasing (วันวิเศษ แก่นนรสิงห์) is a Thai boxer and Muay Thai kickboxer. In amateur boxing he competed at the 1996 Summer Olympics and the 2000 Summer Olympics in Lightweight division.

== Career ==
Veangviseth born in Mueang Khon Kaen District, Khon Kaen Province in boxer family, his family runs a Muay Thai gym. His father was a former Muay Thai kickboxer under the name "Kingkanha Sakpramuan" (กิ่งกัญหา ศักดิ์ประมวล). Veangviseth, fighting as Wanwiset was a notable fighter during the "golden era" of Muay Thai where he received purses of hundreds of thousands of baht per bout. He made his debut in Bangkok in 1991 with a regular fight at Rajadamnern Stadium. He faced some of the top-line Muay Thai kickboxers, for example Chamuekpet Hapalang, Mathee Jadeepitak, Noppadej Sor.Rewadee, Tahaneak Praeaumpol, Chaidej Kiatchansing, Chatchai Paiseetong, Yodkhunpon Sittraiphum, Veeraphol Sahaprom, etc. He also served as a trainer for the famous camp Jocky gym during his fighting career.

For amateur boxing he competed in his first major tournament at the 1996 Summer Olympics in Atlanta by joining the same team as Somluck Kamsing, a first Thai Summer Olympics gold medalist. He also competed again at the next Summer Olympics, in Sydney in 2000. In both tournaments, Veangviseth competed in the lightweight (60 kg) division.

He was the head trainer of the 13Reanresort camp for many years before returning to his native province.

In his personal life, it can be considered that he is good friend with Somluck Kamsing, both of them are Khon Kaen people and their wives are sisters.

== Titles and honours ==
=== Muay Thai ===
- Rajadamnern Stadium
  - 1994 Rajadamnern Stadium Featherweight (126 lbs) Champion
    - One successful title defense

Awards

- 1994 Sports Authority of Thailand Fighter of the Year

=== Boxing ===
Amateur

- 1995 Thailand King's Cup -57 kg (silver)
- 1995 Southeast Asian Games -60 kg (gold)
- 1997 Thailand King's Cup -60 kg (gold)
- 1998 Asian Games -60 kg (gold)

Professional

- PABA Super Featherweight Champion (12 defenses) (2002–2005)

== Muay Thai record ==
Muay Thai Record (Incomplete)
Date	Result	Opponent	Event	Location	Method	Round	Time
1997-06-12	Win	(Thailand) Petchnamek Sor Siriwat	Rajadamnern Stadium	Bangkok, Thailand	Decision	5	3:00
1997-01-29	Win	(Thailand) Apiwat Por Pluemkamol	Rajadamnern Stadium	Bangkok, Thailand	Decision	5	3:00
1996-12-09	Win	(Thailand) Muangfahlek Kiatwichian	Rajadamnern Stadium	Bangkok, Thailand	Decision	5	3:00
1996-11-06	Loss	(Thailand) Apiwat Por Pluemkamol	Rajadamnern Stadium	Bangkok, Thailand	Decision	5	3:00
1996-02-23	Win	(Thailand) Paidaeng Lersakgym	Rajadamnern Stadium	Bangkok, Thailand	Decision	5	3:00
1995-10-27		(Thailand) Changnoi Sirimongkol	Lumpinee Stadium	Bangkok, Thailand	Decision	5	3:00
1995-07-24	Draw	(Thailand) Changnoi Sirimongkol	Rajadamnern Stadium	Bangkok, Thailand	Decision	5	3:00
1995-06-13	Loss	(Thailand) Changnoi Sirimongkol	Lumpinee Stadium	Bangkok, Thailand	Decision	5	3:00
1995-01-25	Win	(Thailand) Noppadet Sor.Rewadee	Rajadamnern Stadium	Bangkok, Thailand	Decision	5	3:00
1994-12-28	Win	(Thailand) Mathee Jadeepitak	Rajadamnern Stadium	Bangkok, Thailand	Decision	5	3:00
1994-	Win	(Thailand) Prabseuk Sitsantat	Rajadamnern Stadium	Bangkok, Thailand	Decision	5	3:00
1994-10-19	Win	(Thailand) Chatchai Paiseetong	Rajadamnern Stadium	Bangkok, Thailand	Decision	5	3:00
1994-09-02	Win	(Thailand) Padejsuk Bor.Brandigym	Lumpinee Stadium	Bangkok, Thailand	Decision	5	3:00
1994-06-27	Loss	(Thailand) Chaidet Kiatchansing	Rajadamnern Stadium	Bangkok, Thailand	Decision	5	3:00
Loses the Rajadamnern Stadium Featherweight (126 lbs) title.
1994-05-04	Win	(Thailand) Noppadet Sor.Rewadee	Rajadamnern Stadium	Bangkok, Thailand	Decision	5	3:00
Defends the Rajadamnern Stadium Featherweight (126 lbs) title.
1994-	Win	(Thailand) Phannarin Sor.Suwanpakdee	Rajadamnern Stadium	Bangkok, Thailand	Decision	5	3:00
1994-02-23	Win	(Thailand) Paidaeng Lersakgym	Rajadamnern Stadium	Bangkok, Thailand	Decision	5	3:00
1994-01-12	Win	(Thailand) Noppadet Sor.Rewadee	Rajadamnern Stadium	Bangkok, Thailand	Decision	5	3:00
Wins the Rajadamnern Stadium Featherweight (126 lbs) title.
1993-11-12	Loss	(Thailand) Kukrit Sor Nayaiam	Lumpinee Stadium	Bangkok, Thailand	Decision	5	3:00
1993-09-29	Win	(Thailand) Chamuekpet Chorchamuang	Rajadamnern Stadium	Bangkok, Thailand	Decision	5	3:00
1993-08-18	Loss	(Thailand) Noppadet Sor.Rewadee	Rajadamnern Stadium	Bangkok, Thailand	Decision	5	3:00
For the vacant Rajadamnern Stadium Featherweight (126 lbs) title.
1993-07-28	Win	(Thailand) Tahaneak Pichitman	Rajadamnern Stadium	Bangkok, Thailand	Decision	5	3:00
1993-06-23	Win	(Thailand) Banluedet Lukprabat	Rajadamnern Stadium	Bangkok, Thailand	Decision	5	3:00
1993-05-26	Loss	(Thailand) Chamuekpet Hapalang	Rajadamnern Stadium	Bangkok, Thailand	Decision	5	3:00
1992-12-12	Loss	(Thailand) Seesot Chor Vikun	Rajadamnern Stadium show	Malaysia	Decision	5	3:00
1992-10-28	Win	(Thailand) Noppadet Sor.Rewadee	Rajadamnern Stadium	Bangkok, Thailand	Decision	5	3:00
1992-07-22	Loss	(Thailand) Kukrit Sor.Nayaiam	Rajadamnern Stadium	Bangkok, Thailand	Decision	5	3:00
1992-	Win	(Thailand) Muangfahlek Kiatwichian	Rajadamnern Stadium	Bangkok, Thailand	Decision	5	3:00
1992-03-26	Win	(Thailand) Ekayuth Por.Bunya	Lumpinee Stadium	Bangkok, Thailand	Decision	5	3:00
1992-02-20	Loss	(Thailand) Veeraphol Sahaprom		Bangkok, Thailand	KO	4	
1991-12-11	Draw	(Thailand) Ekayuth Por.Bunya	Lumpinee Stadium	Bangkok, Thailand	Decision	5	3:00
1991-10-30	Win	(Thailand) Tahaneak Praeaumpol	Rajadamnern Stadium	Bangkok, Thailand	TKO (leg injury)	3	3:00
1991-07-23	Loss	(Thailand) Yodkhunpon Sittraiphum	Lumpinee Stadium	Bangkok, Thailand	KO (Knee)	3	
1991-06-24	Loss	(Thailand) Ekaphon Chuwattana	Rajadamnern Stadium	Bangkok, Thailand	Decision	5	3:00
1991-04-04	Win	(Thailand) Yutthasak Tansaringkarn	Rajadamnern Stadium	Bangkok, Thailand	Decision	5	3:00
1991-03-04	Win	(Thailand) Youngtrang Kiatkaosaen	Rajadamnern Stadium	Bangkok, Thailand	Decision	5	3:00
Wins 300,000 baht side-bet.
1990-09-23	Win	(Thailand) Komjack Sit Sor.Por.Sor	Rajadamnern Stadium	Bangkok, Thailand	Decision	5	3:00
Legend: Win Loss Draw/No contest Notes
