= Kangwannoi Or.Sribualoi =

Thai former professional Muay Thai fighter

- Born: Uthai Kailas c. 1969; Bua Yai, Nakhon Ratchasima, Thailand
- Native name: อุทัย ไกรลาศ
- Nickname: Graceful Warrior of the Wind (จอมยุทธพริ้ววาโย)
- Division: Bantamweight; Featherweight; Super Featherweight
- Style: Muay Thai (Muay Femur)
- Stance: Southpaw

Other information
- Occupation: Muay Thai trainer
- Notable relatives: Saenklai SitKruOd (younger half-brother)

Uthai Kailas (Thai: อุทัย ไกรลาศ), known professionally as Kangwannoi Or.Sribualoi (Thai: กังวาลน้อย อ.ศรีบัวลอย), is a Thai former professional Muay Thai fighter. He is a former Lumpinee Stadium Bantamweight Champion who was active during the 1980s and 1990s. He is also the older half-brother of Saenklai SitKruOd, another famous fighter.

== Biography and career ==
He trained at the SitKruOd gym alongside his brother, Saenklai SitKruOd.

He fought during the Golden Era of Muay Thai against many notable fighters including Wangchannoi Sor.Palangchai, Boonlai Sor.Thanikul, Dokmaipa Por.Pongsawang, Rajasak Sor.Vorapin, Taweesaklek Ploysakda, Padejseuk Kiatsamran, Yodpetch Sor.Jitpattana, M16 Bor.Khor.Sor., and Nuengthoranee Petchyindee.

== Titles and honours ==
- Lumpinee Stadium
  - 1989 Lumpinee Stadium Bantamweight (118 lbs) Champion
    - One successful defense

== Fight record ==
Muay Thai Record (Incomplete)
Date	Result	Opponent	Event	Location	Method	Round	Time
1995-03-25	Loss	(Thailand) Chingchai Sakdarun		Bangkok, Thailand	TKO	5	
1994-12-06	Win	(Thailand) Kukrit Sor.Nayayarm	Lumpinee Stadium	Bangkok, Thailand	Decision	5	3:00
1993-07-20	Win	(Thailand) M16 Bor.Khor.Sor.	Lumpinee Stadium	Bangkok, Thailand	Decision	5	3:00
1993-06-22	Win	(Thailand) M16 Bor.Khor.Sor.	Lumpinee Stadium	Bangkok, Thailand	Decision	5	3:00
1993-05-25	Win	(Thailand) Saentor Kiatmuangkanchan	Lumpinee Stadium	Bangkok, Thailand	Decision	5	3:00
1993-02-02	Loss	(Thailand) Padejseuk Kiatsamran		Thailand	Decision	5	3:00
1993-01-15	Loss	(Thailand) M16 Bor.Khor.Sor.	Lumpinee Stadium	Bangkok, Thailand	Decision	5	3:00
1992-12-24	Win	(Thailand) Changnoi Sirimongkol		Thailand	Decision	5	3:00
1992-11-17	Win	(Thailand) Duangkaew Sor.Banmai		Thailand	Decision	5	3:00
1992-10-20	Win	(Thailand) Suwitlek Sor.Sakaowarat	Lumpinee Stadium	Bangkok, Thailand	Decision	5	3:00
1992-10-06	Win	(Thailand) Nuengsiam Kiatwichian	Lumpinee Stadium	Bangkok, Thailand	Decision	5	3:00
1992-08-28	Win	(Thailand) Changnoi Sirimongkol		Thailand	Decision	5	3:00
1992-08-04	Loss	(Thailand) Chamuekpet Chorchamuang		Thailand	Decision	5	3:00
1992-07-08	Win	(Thailand) Jack Kiatniwat	Rajadamnern Stadium	Bangkok, Thailand	Decision	5	3:00
1992-06-19	Win	(Thailand) Rajasak Sor.Vorapin	Lumpinee Stadium	Bangkok, Thailand	Decision	5	3:00
1992-05-12	Loss	(Thailand) Pepsi Biyapan		Thailand	Decision	5	3:00
1992-04-10	Win	(Thailand) Kukrit Sor.Nayayarm		Thailand	Decision	5	3:00
1992-03-06	Draw	(Thailand) Kukrit Sor.Nayayarm	Lumpinee Stadium	Bangkok, Thailand	Decision	5	3:00
1992-01-24	Win	(Thailand) Kukrit Sor.Nayayarm	Lumpinee Stadium	Bangkok, Thailand	Decision	5	3:00
1992-01-03	Win	(Thailand) Wisanlek Lukbangplasoi	Lumpinee Stadium	Bangkok, Thailand	Decision	5	3:00
1991-09-20	Loss	(Thailand) Noppadet Sor.Rewadee		Thailand	Decision	5	3:00
1991-08-23	Loss	(Thailand) Noppadet Sor.Rewadee	Lumpinee Stadium	Bangkok, Thailand	Decision	5	3:00
1991-08-02	Loss	(Thailand) Kukrit Sor.Nayayarm	Lumpinee Stadium	Bangkok, Thailand	Decision	5	3:00
1991-06-24	Win	(Thailand) Noppadet Sor.Rewadee	Rajadamnern Stadium	Bangkok, Thailand	Decision	5	3:00
1991-05-24	Win	(Thailand) Grandprixnoi MuangChaiyapum		Thailand	Decision	5	3:00
1991-05-03	Win	(Thailand) Yodpetch Sor.Jitpattana		Thailand	Decision	5	3:00
1991-03-19	Loss	(Thailand) Yodpetch Sor.Jitpattana	Lumpinee Stadium	Bangkok, Thailand	Decision	5	3:00
1991-02-08	Win	(Thailand) Decha Sitbanjong	Lumpinee Stadium	Bangkok, Thailand	Decision	5	3:00
1991-01-18	Loss	(Thailand) Decha Sitbanjong	Lumpinee Stadium	Bangkok, Thailand	Decision	5	3:00
1990-12-21	Win	(Thailand) Kukrit Sor.Naiyaam	Lumpinee Stadium	Bangkok, Thailand	Decision	5	3:00
1990-10-19	Loss	(Thailand) Yodpetch Sor.Jitpattana	Lumpinee Stadium	Bangkok, Thailand	Decision	5	3:00
1990-09-07	Loss	(Thailand) Taweesaklek Ploysakda	Lumpinee Stadium	Bangkok, Thailand	Decision	5	3:00
For the Lumpinee Stadium Bantamweight (118 lbs) title.
1990-07-24	Loss	(Thailand) Taweesaklek Ploysakda	Lumpinee Stadium	Bangkok, Thailand	Decision	5	3:00
Loses the Lumpinee Stadium Bantamweight (118 lbs) title.
1990-06-08	Win	(Thailand) Wangchannoi Sor.Palangchai	Lumpinee Stadium	Bangkok, Thailand	Decision	5	3:00
1990-05-27	Win	(United States) Michael Barb		Phoenix, USA	KO	2	
1990-05-11	Win	(Thailand) Yodpetch Sor.Jitpattana	Lumpinee Stadium	Bangkok, Thailand	Decision	5	3:00
Defends the Lumpinee Stadium Bantamweight (118 lbs) title.
1990-04-24	Win	(Thailand) Dokmaipa Por Pongsawang	Lumpinee Stadium	Bangkok, Thailand	Decision	5	3:00
1990-03-23	Win	(Thailand) Grandprixnoi Muangchaiyaphum	Lumpinee Stadium	Bangkok, Thailand	Decision	5	3:00
1990-03-02	Win	(Thailand) Boonlai Sor.Thanikul	Lumpinee Stadium	Bangkok, Thailand	Decision	5	3:00
1990-02-06	Loss	(Thailand) Boonlai Sor.Thanikul	Lumpinee Stadium	Bangkok, Thailand	Decision	5	3:00
1990-01-20	Win	(Thailand) Dokmaipa Por Pongsawang	Lumpinee Stadium	Bangkok, Thailand	Decision	5	3:00
1989-12-26	Win	(Thailand) Noppadet Sor.Rewadee	Lumpinee Stadium	Bangkok, Thailand	Decision	5	3:00
1989-12-08	Win	(Thailand) Saichon Pichitsuek	Lumpinee Stadium	Bangkok, Thailand	Decision	5	3:00
Wins the Lumpinee Stadium Bantamweight (118 lbs) title.
1989-10-17	Win	(Thailand) Detduang Por.Pongsawang	Lumpinee Stadium	Bangkok, Thailand	Decision	5	3:00
1989-09-01	Win	(Thailand) Yodpetch Sor.Jitpattana	Lumpinee Stadium	Bangkok, Thailand	Decision	5	3:00
1989-08-04	Loss	(Thailand) Saichon Pichitsuek	Petchyindee, Lumpinee Stadium	Bangkok, Thailand	Decision (Unanimous)	5	3:00
For the Lumpinee Stadium Bantamweight (118 lbs) title.
1989-06-30	Win	(Thailand) Yodpetch Sor.Jitpattana		Thailand	Decision	5	3:00
1989-06-10	Win	(Thailand) Ploysenae Sor.Bodin		Bo Rai district, Thailand	Decision	5	3:00
1989-05-16	Draw	(Thailand) Teeyai Piyaphan		Thailand	Decision	5	3:00
1989-04-23	Loss	(Thailand) Klairuangnoi Sit Banjong	Samrong Stadium	Samut Prakan, Thailand	Decision	5	3:00
1989-04-21	Win	(Thailand) Khempetch Kiatakorn		Thailand	KO	3	
1989-03-26	Win	(Thailand) Teeyai Piyaphan	Samrong Stadium	Samut Prakan, Thailand	Decision	5	3:00
1989-02-26	Win	(Thailand) Payu Lukthapfa	Samrong Stadium	Samut Prakan, Thailand	Decision	5	3:00
1989-01-27	Loss	(Thailand) Teeyai Piyaphan	Lumpinee Stadium	Bangkok, Thailand	Decision	5	3:00
1989-01-26	Win	(Thailand) Pansak Boonsomchai		Buriram province, Thailand	Decision	5	3:00
1989-01-16	Win	(Thailand) Saengdaonoi Tor.Silachai		Dan Khun Thot district, Thailand	Decision	5	3:00
1988-12-22	Win	(Thailand) Namphon Chomphuthong	Nok Khao Stadium	Pattaya, Thailand	Decision	5	3:00
1987-01-10	Loss	(Thailand) Nuengthoranee Petchyindee	Lumpinee Stadium	Bangkok, Thailand	referee stoppage	4	
Legend: Win Loss Draw/No contest Notes
