= Mathee Jadeepitak =

Thai former professional Muay Thai fighter

- Born: Matee Tongbua; August 11, 1972 (age 54); Mueang Ratchaburi, Thailand
- Other names: Mathee Sor.Chaowarin (เมธี ส.เชาวริน)
- Nickname: Dragon Leg (แข้งมังกร)
- Nationality: Thai-American
- Height: 168 cm (5 ft 6 in)
- Division: Featherweight; Super Lightweight; Welterweight; Super Welterweight
- Style: Muay Thai (Muay Femur)
- Stance: Southpaw

Other information
- Occupation: Muay Thai trainer

Matee Tongbua (Thai: เมธี ทองบัว; born August 11, 1972), known professionally as Mathee Jadeepitak (Thai: เมธี เจดีย์พิทักษ์), is a Thai former professional Muay Thai fighter. He is a former Lumpinee Stadium Featherweight Champion who was famous during the 1990s.

== Career ==
Mathee was a top fighter under the OneSongchai promotion during the 1990s, he was known for his powerful left leg which helped him capture a Lumpinee Stadium title in 1994.

Mathee moved to the United States in 2001 where he kept competing. On December 15, 2001, Mathee faced Danny Steele at United for the Children event with the IKF Sanshou World welterweight title at stake. Mathee won the fight by unanimous decision against a Steele who missed weight.

He currently teaches Muay Thai at Final Round Training Center and Warrior Way in Michigan. In 2021 he became a US citizen.

== Titles and honours ==
- Lumpinee Stadium
  - 1994 Lumpinee Stadium Featherweight (126 lbs) Champion
    - Two successful title defenses
- World Muay Thai Council
  - 1995 WMC World Featherweight (126 lbs) Champion
    - One successful title defense
- International Kickboxing Federation
  - 2001 IKF Sanshou Welterweight (147 lbs) World Champion

== Fight record ==
Muay Thai Record (Incomplete)
126 Wins (38 (T)KO's), 54 Losses
Date	Result	Opponent	Event	Location	Method	Round	Time
2007-11-10	Loss	(United States) Chike Lindsay	Warrior's Challenge	Fresno, California, USA	Decision (Unanimous)	5	3:00
For the IMTO World Super Welterweight (154 lbs) Championship.
2003-08-24	Win	(United States) Danny Steele	Summer Slam Muay Thai Challenge	Fresno, California, USA	Decision (Unanimous)	5	3:00
2002-06-01	Loss	(Thailand) Pajonsuk Lukprabat	Bad to the Bone	Santa Ana Pueblo, NM, USA	TKO (shoulder injury)	4	
For the I.K.K.C. Muaythai World Super Lightweight (140 lbs) title.
2001-12-15	Win	(United States) Danny Steele	United for the Children 2001	San Jose, California, USA	Decision (Unanimous)	5	3:00
Wins the vacant IKF Pro Sanshou Welterweight (147 lbs) World title.
2001-02-10	Win	(Thailand) Saphanphet Sor.Sakowarat	Omnoi Stadium	Samut Sakhon, Thailand	Decision	5	3:00
2000–	Loss	(Thailand) Huasai Mor.Payakaroon	Lumpinee Stadium	Bangkok, Thailand	TKO	3	
2000-08-19	Loss	(Thailand) Thongthai Por.Burapha	Lumpinee Stadium	Bangkok, Thailand	Decision	5	3:00
1999-12-21	Loss	(Thailand) Kotchasarn Singklongsi	Lumpinee Stadium	Bangkok, Thailand	Decision	5	3:00
1999–	Loss	(Thailand) Rambojiew Por.Thubtim	Lumpinee Stadium	Bangkok, Thailand	Decision	5	3:00
1998-10-10	Loss	(Thailand) Khunsuk Sitporamet	Lumpinee Stadium	Bangkok, Thailand	Decision	5	3:00
1998-06-26	Loss	(Thailand) Attachai Por.Samranchai	Lumpinee Stadium	Bangkok, Thailand	Decision	5	3:00
1998-05-26	Loss	(Thailand) Jompoplek Sor.Sumalee	Lumpinee Stadium	Bangkok, Thailand	Decision	5	3:00
1998-02-27	Loss	(Thailand) Jompoplek Sor.Sumalee	Lumpinee Stadium	Bangkok, Thailand	Decision	5	3:00
1998-02-03	Win	(Thailand) Attachai Por.Samranchai	Lumpinee Stadium	Bangkok, Thailand	Decision	5	3:00
1997-06-29	Win	(Thailand) Keng Singnakhonkui		Ratchaburi, Thailand	Decision	5	3:00
1997-03-23	Win	(Thailand) Samkor Kiatmontep	Samrong Stadium	Samut Prakan, Thailand	Decision	5	3:00
Wins the Samrong Stadium Featherweight (126 lbs) title.
1997-01-17	Win	(Thailand) Ritthichai Lukchaophordam	Lumpinee Stadium	Bangkok, Thailand	Decision	5	3:00
1996–	Win	(Thailand) Kaolan Kaovichit	Lumpinee Stadium	Bangkok, Thailand	Decision	5	3:00
1996-08-23	Draw	(Thailand) Prabsuk Sitnarong	Lumpinee Stadium	Bangkok, Thailand	Decision	5	3:00
Defends the WMC World Featherweight (126 lbs) title.
1996-05-21	Loss	(Thailand) Lamnamoon Sor.Sumalee	Lumpinee Stadium	Bangkok, Thailand	Decision	5	3:00
Loses the Lumpinee Stadium Featherweight (126 lbs) title.
1996-03-29	Draw	(Thailand) Namkabuan Nongkeepahuyuth	Lumpinee Stadium	Bangkok, Thailand	Decision	5	3:00
1996-01-26	Win	(Thailand) Kaoponglek Luksuratham	Lumpinee Stadium	Bangkok, Thailand	Decision	5	3:00
1995-12-26	Win	(Thailand) Choengnoen Sitphutthapim	Onesongchai, Lumpinee Stadium	Bangkok, Thailand	TKO	3	
1995-10-31	Win	(Thailand) Prabsuek Sitsanthat	Onesongchai, Lumpinee Stadium	Bangkok, Thailand	Decision	5	3:00
Wins the WMC World Featherweight (126 lbs) title.
1995-08-22	Loss	(Thailand) Lamnamoon Sor.Sumalee	Lumpinee Stadium	Bangkok, Thailand	KO (Punches)	3	
1995-07-10	Loss	(Thailand) Namkabuan Nongkeepahuyuth	Rajadamnern Stadium	Bangkok, Thailand	Decision	5	3:00
1995-06-19	Win	(Thailand) Namtaothong Sor.Sirikul	Rajadamnern Stadium	Bangkok, Thailand	Decision	5	3:00
1995-04-	Win	(Thailand) Jompoplek Sor.Sumalee	Lumpinee Stadium	Bangkok, Thailand	Decision	5	3:00
1995-03-24	Win	(Thailand) Ritthichai Lookchaomaesaitong	Lumpinee Stadium	Bangkok, Thailand	Decision	5	3:00
Defends the Lumpinee Stadium Featherweight (126 lbs) title.
1995-02-27	Loss	(Thailand) Lamnamoon Sor.Sumalee	Rajadamnern Stadium	Bangkok, Thailand	Decision	5	3:00
1995-01-17	Loss	(Thailand) Samkor Chor.Rathchatasupak	Fairtex, Lumpinee Stadium	Bangkok, Thailand	Decision	5	3:00
1994-12-28	Loss	(Thailand) Wanwiset Kaennorasing	Rajadamnern Stadium	Bangkok, Thailand	Decision	5	3:00
1994-11-15	Loss	(Thailand) Samkor Chor.Rathchatasupak	Lumpinee Stadium	Bangkok, Thailand	Decision	5	3:00
Wins the 1.9 million baht side-bet.
1994-09-09	Win	(Thailand) Chatchai Paiseetong	Lumpinee Stadium	Bangkok, Thailand	Decision	5	3:00
Defends the Lumpinee Stadium Featherweight (126 lbs) title.
1994-08-22	Win	(Thailand) Hansuk Prasathinpanomrung	Rajadamnern Stadium	Bangkok, Thailand	Decision	5	3:00
1994-07-29	Win	(Thailand) Therdkiat Sitthepitak	Lumpinee Stadium	Bangkok, Thailand	TKO (Doctor stoppage/cut)	4	
Wins the Lumpinee Stadium Featherweight (126 lbs) title.
1994-06-28	Win	(Thailand) Ritthichai Lookchaomaesaitong	Lumpinee Stadium	Bangkok, Thailand	Decision	5	3:00
1994-05-27	Loss	(Thailand) Chatchai Paiseetong	Lumpinee Stadium	Bangkok, Thailand	TKO (High kick)	2	
1994-04-22	Win	(Thailand) Pairot Wor.Wolapon	Lumpinee Stadium	Bangkok, Thailand	Decision	5	3:00
1994-03-22	Loss	(Thailand) Namkabuan Nongkeepahuyuth	Lumpinee Stadium	Bangkok, Thailand	KO (elbows + knee)	2	
1994-02-21	Loss	(Thailand) Namkabuan Nongkeepahuyuth	Rajadamnern Stadium	Bangkok, Thailand	Decision	5	3:00
1994-01-31	Win	(Thailand) Nuathoranee Wor.Taweekiat	Rajadamnern Stadium	Bangkok, Thailand	Decision	5	3:00
1993-12-24	Win	(Thailand) Oley Kiatoneway	Fairtex, Lumpinee Stadium	Bangkok, Thailand	Decision	5	3:00
1993-10-18	Win	(Thailand) Cherry Sor.Wanich	Lumpinee Stadium	Bangkok, Thailand	Decision	5	3:00
1993-09-17	Loss	(Thailand) Wangchannoi Sor.Palangchai	Lumpinee Stadium	Bangkok, Thailand	Decision	5	3:00
1993-07-30	Loss	(Thailand) Karuhat Sor.Supawan	Lumpinee Stadium	Bangkok, Thailand	Decision	5	3:00
1993-07-	Win	(Thailand) Ritthichai Lookchaomaesaitong	Lumpinee Stadium	Bangkok, Thailand	Decision	5	3:00
1993-06-08	Loss	(Thailand) Superlek Sornisaan	Lumpinee Stadium	Bangkok, Thailand	Decision	5	3:00
1993-04-30	Win	(Thailand) Pomphet Naratreekul	Lumpinee Stadium	Bangkok, Thailand	Decision	5	3:00
?	Win	(Thailand) Thanooin Chor Cheuchart	Lumpinee Stadium	Bangkok, Thailand	TKO (Doctor stoppage)	4	
1992-12-07	Loss	(Thailand) Langsuan Panyuthaphum	Lumpinee Stadium	Bangkok, Thailand	Decision	5	3:00
1992-10-27	Win	(Thailand) Boonthang Singhuaykaew	Lumpinee Stadium	Bangkok, Thailand	Decision	5	3:00
1992-08-22	Win	(Thailand) Samingprai Sor.Rungnakhon	Lumpinee Stadium	Bangkok, Thailand	Decision	5	3:00
1992-05-05	Loss	(Thailand) D-Day Kiatmungkan	Lumpinee Stadium	Bangkok, Thailand	Decision	5	3:00
1992-03-16	Win	(Thailand) Boonlertlek Sor.Nanthana	Lumpinee Stadium	Bangkok, Thailand	Decision	5	3:00
1992-02-07	Loss	(Thailand) Karuhat Sor.Supawan	Lumpinee Stadium	Bangkok, Thailand	Decision	5	3:00
1991-09-27	Loss	(Thailand) Boonlong Sor.Thanikul	Lumpinee Stadium	Bangkok, Thailand	KO	2	
1991-09-07	Win	(Thailand) Kruekchai Sor.Kettalingchan	Rajadamnern Stadium	Bangkok, Thailand	Decision	5	3:00
1991-05-31	Loss	(Thailand) Chainoi Muangsurin	Lumpinee Stadium	Bangkok, Thailand	Decision	5	3:00
1991-05-10	Win	(Thailand) Detduang Por.Pongsawang	Lumpinee Stadium	Bangkok, Thailand	KO	2	
1991-03-29	Loss	(Thailand) Karuhat Sor.Supawan	Lumpinee Stadium	Bangkok, Thailand	Decision	5	3:00
1991-02-12	Draw	(Thailand) Chainoi Muangsurin	Lumpinee Stadium	Bangkok, Thailand	Decision	5	3:00
1991-01-21	Win	(Thailand) Jaroensap Kiatbanchong	Rajadamnern Stadium	Bangkok, Thailand	Decision	5	3:00
1990-12-07	Loss	(Thailand) Langsuan Panyuthaphum	Lumpinee Stadium	Bangkok, Thailand	Decision	5	3:00
1990-07-10	Loss	(Thailand) Panphet Muangsurin	Lumpinee Stadium	Bangkok, Thailand	Decision	5	3:00
1990-06-19	Loss	(Thailand) Panphet Muangsurin	Lumpinee Stadium	Bangkok, Thailand	Decision	5	3:00
1990-05-29	Win	(Thailand) Paruhatlek Sitchunthong	Lumpinee Stadium	Bangkok, Thailand	Decision	5	3:00
1990-05-01	Win	(Thailand) Toto Por.Pongsawang	Lumpinee Stadium	Bangkok, Thailand	Decision	5	3:00
1990-03-17	Win	(Thailand) Phetmai Na Det Udom	Lumpinee Stadium	Bangkok, Thailand	KO	2	
1990-01-15	Loss	(Thailand) Taweesaklek Ploysakda	Rajadamnern Stadium	Bangkok, Thailand	KO	4	
1989-10-06	Loss	(Thailand) Sakmongkol Sithchuchok	Lumpinee Stadium	Bangkok, Thailand	Decision	5	3:00
1989-06-24	Win	(Thailand) Thangduwan Sit Tuanthong	Lumpinee Stadium	Bangkok, Thailand	KO	4	
Legend: Win Loss Draw/No contest Notes
