= Jaroensak Kiatnakornchon =

Thai professional Muay Thai fighter (1968–2001)

- Born: Somphop Kamnil; May 6, 1968; Nong Prue, Phanat Nikhom, Chonburi, Thailand
- Died: c. 2001; Nong Prue, Phanat Nikhom, Chonburi, Thailand
- Native name: สมภพ คำนิล
- Other names: Jaroensak Or.Nueangjamnong (เจริญศักดิ์ อ.เนื่องจำนงค์)
- Nickname: Duck Feet (ไอ้ตีนเป็ด)
- Division: Flyweight; Super Flyweight; Bantamweight
- Style: Muay Thai (Muay Tae)
- Stance: Southpaw
- Team: Kiatnakornchon

Somphop Kamnil (Thai: สมภพ คำนิล; born May 6, 1968 – 2001), known professionally as Jaroensak Kiatnakornchon (Thai: เจริญศักดิ์ เกียรตินครชล), was a Thai former professional Muay Thai fighter. He was a Lumpinee Stadium and Rajadamnern Stadium champion at Bantamweight who was active during the 1980s and 1990s.

== Biography and career ==
He trained at the Kiatnakornchon gym and was known for his technical southpaw kicking style.

The peak of his career was during the Golden Era of Muay Thai against Samson Isaan, Saenklai Sit Kru Od, Yodkhunpon Sittraiphum, and Veeraphol Sahaprom who’re considered amongst the greatest fighters of all time. Most notably he defeated Samson by decision for his Bantamweight title at Lumpinee Stadium, won another decision against Samson, lost another decision to Saenklai, defeated Yodkhunpon by decision, lost the final fight against Samson by third-round knockout, and then lost his title to Yodkhunpon in 1992. However, in 1993, he’d earn a third fight against Yodkhunpon for his Bantamweight title at Rajadamnern Stadium which he won by decision.

Sometime after his retirement, he was stabbed and killed in an altercation.

== Titles and honours ==
- Lumpinee Stadium
  - 1992 Lumpinee Stadium (118 lbs) Champion
    - One successful title defense
- Rajadamnern Stadium
  - 1993 Rajadamnern Stadium (118 lbs) Champion

== Fight record ==
Muay Thai Record (Incomplete)
| Date | Result | Opponent | Event | Location | Method | Round | Time |
|---|---|---|---|---|---|---|---|
| 1994-12-02 | Loss | Thailand Pinsinchai | Lumpinee Stadium | Bangkok, Thailand | Decision | 5 | 3:00 |
| 1994-10- | Loss | (Thailand) Rotnarong Daopadriew | | Thailand | Decision | 5 | 3:00 |
| 1994-08-18 | Win | (Thailand) Thewaritnoi Sor.Rakchat | Aswindam, Rajadamnern Stadium | Bangkok, Thailand | Decision | 5 | 3:00 |
| 1994-07-14 | Loss | (Thailand) Rotnarong Daopadriew | Rangsit Stadium | Rangsit, Thailand | Decision | 5 | 3:00 |
| 1994-04-07 | Win | (Thailand) Langsuan Taximeter | Aswindam, Rajadamnern Stadium | Bangkok, Thailand | Decision | 5 | 3:00 |
| 1993-11-30 | Loss | Thailand Pinsinchai | Aswindam, Rajadamnern Stadium | Bangkok, Thailand | Decision | 5 | 3:00 |
| 1993-10-16 | Loss | (Thailand) Veeraphol Sahaprom | Rajadamnern Stadium | Bangkok, Thailand | Decision | 5 | 3:00 |
| 1993-09-16 | Win | (Thailand) Yodkhunpon Sittraiphum | Aswindam, Rajadamnern Stadium | Bangkok, Thailand | TKO (Injury) | 3 | |
Wins the Rajadamnern Stadium Bantamweight (118 lbs) title.
| 1993-07-12 | Win | (Thailand) Duangsompong Por.Pongsawang | Aswindam, Rajadamnern Stadium | Bangkok, Thailand | TKO | 2 | |
| 1993-05-17 | Win | (Thailand) Chain Pinsinchai | Aswindam, Rajadamnern Stadium | Bangkok, Thailand | KO (Head Kick) | 4 | |
| 1993-04-09 | Loss | (Thailand) Tukatathong Por.Pongsawang | Lumpinee Stadium | Bangkok, Thailand | Decision | 5 | 3:00 |
| 1992-12-08 | Loss | (Thailand) Yodkhunpon Sittraiphum | Petchyindee, Lumpinee Stadium | Bangkok, Thailand | Decision | 5 | 3:00 |
Lost the Lumpinee Stadium Bantamweight (118 lbs) title.
| 1992-10-30 | Loss | (Thailand) Saenmuangnoi Lukjaopormehasak | Petchyindee, Lumpinee Stadium | Bangkok, Thailand | TKO (punches) | 3 | |
| 1992-08-28 | Loss | (Thailand) Saenklai Sit Kru Od | Lumpinee Stadium | Bangkok, Thailand | Decision | 5 | 3:00 |
| 1992-08-04 | Win | (Thailand) Yodkhunpon Sittraiphum | Lumpinee Stadium | Bangkok, Thailand | Decision | 5 | 3:00 |
| 1992-06-29 | Loss | (Thailand) Lakhin Wassantasit | Petchthongkham, Rajadamnern Stadium | Bangkok, Thailand | Decision | 5 | 3:00 |
| 1992-06-02 | Win | (Thailand) Saenmuangnoi Lukjaopormehasak | Lumpinee Stadium | Bangkok, Thailand | Decision | 5 | 3:00 |
Defends the Lumpinee Stadium Bantamweight (118 lbs) title.
| 1992-03-31 | Win | (Thailand) Saenmuangnoi Lukjaopormehasak | Petchyindee, Lumpinee Stadium | Bangkok, Thailand | Decision | 5 | 3:00 |
Wins the Lumpinee Stadium Bantamweight (118 lbs) title.
| 1991-12- | Win | (Thailand) Taweesaklek Ploysakda | Lumpinee Stadium | Bangkok, Thailand | Decision | 5 | 3:00 |
| 1991-11- | Win | (Thailand) Anantasak Panyuthaphum | Lumpinee Stadium | Bangkok, Thailand | Decision | 5 | 3:00 |
| 1991-11-08 | Win | (Thailand) Kraiwannoi Sit Kru Od | Lumpinee Stadium | Bangkok, Thailand | Decision | 5 | 3:00 |
| 1991-09-20 | Win | (Thailand) Chakchai Nareumon | Petchyindee, Lumpinee Stadium | Bangkok, Thailand | Decision | 5 | 3:00 |
| 1991-08-20 | Win | (Thailand) Pepsi Piyaphan | Lumpinee Stadium | Bangkok, Thailand | Decision | 5 | 3:00 |
| 1991-07-23 | Win | (Thailand) Pepsi Piyaphan | Petchyindee, Lumpinee Stadium | Bangkok, Thailand | Decision | 5 | 3:00 |
| 1991-06-25 | Win | (Thailand) Wangkhon Por.Muangyang | Chatuchok, Lumpinee Stadium | Bangkok, Thailand | Decision | 5 | 3:00 |
| 1991-05- | Loss | (Thailand) Kraiwannoi Sit Kru Od | Lumpinee Stadium | Bangkok, Thailand | KO | 2 | |
| 1991-04- | Loss | (Thailand) Kraiwannoi Sit Kru Od | Lumpinee Stadium | Bangkok, Thailand | Decision | 5 | 3:00 |
| 1991-03-19 | Loss | (Thailand) Saenklai Sit Kru Od | Petchyindee, Lumpinee Stadium | Bangkok, Thailand | Decision | 5 | 3:00 |
| 1991-02- | Win | (Thailand) Chakchai Narumon | Lumpinee Stadium | Bangkok, Thailand | Decision | 5 | 3:00 |
| 1991-01- | Loss | (Thailand) Dentaksin Kiatratthapol | Lumpinee Stadium | Bangkok, Thailand | Decision | 5 | 3:00 |
| 1990-11-23 | Win | (Thailand) Pepsi Sitphrawitsanutep | Lumpinee Stadium | Bangkok, Thailand | Decision | 5 | 3:00 |
| 1990-07-24 | Win | (Thailand) Suanthong Muangmapud | Petchyindee, Lumpinee Stadium | Bangkok, Thailand | Decision | 5 | 3:00 |
| 1989-10-30 | Loss | (Thailand) Paiboon Narumon | | Chanthaburi province, Thailand | Decision | 5 | 3:00 |
| 1989-09-14 | Win | (Thailand) Wirutchai Yodrotgym | | Rayong province, Thailand | Decision | 5 | 3:00 |
| 1987-11-06 | Win | (Thailand) Heman Sakniran | Lumpinee Stadium | Bangkok, Thailand | Decision | 5 | 3:00 |
| 1986-10-04 | Loss | (Thailand) Samartnoi SitsianUat | | Nan province, Thailand | Decision | 5 | 3:00 |
| 1985-01-25 | Loss | (Thailand) Grandprixnoi MuangChaiyapum | Petchyindee, Lumpinee Stadium | Bangkok, Thailand | Decision | 5 | 3:00 |
| 1985-01-01 | Draw | (Thailand) Eddie Sitwatsiripong | Petchyindee, Lumpinee Stadium | Bangkok, Thailand | Decision | 5 | 3:00 |
Legend: Win Loss Draw/No contest Notes
