= Noppadet Sor.Rewadee =

Thai former professional Muay Thai fighter

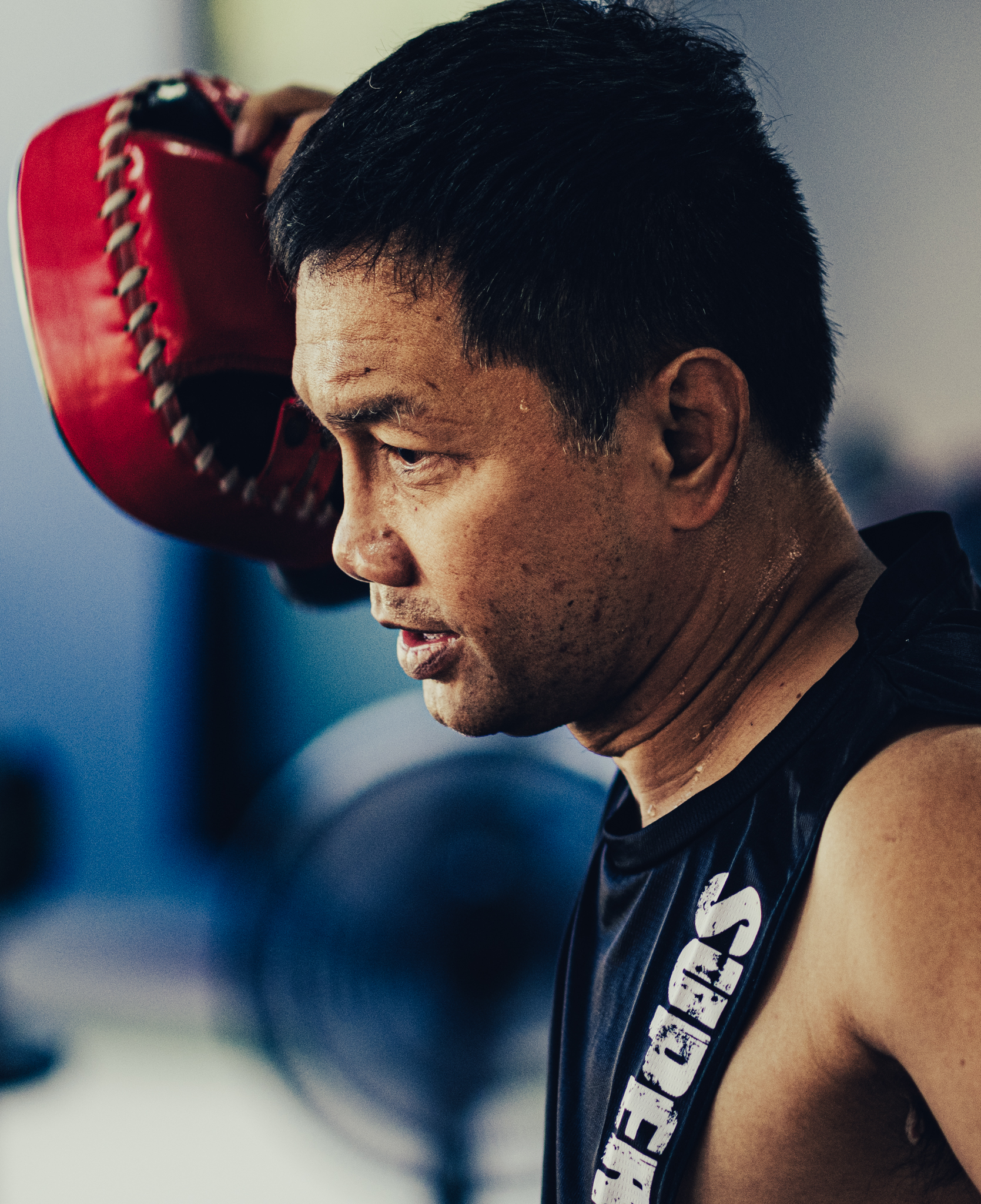
- Noppadet in 2024
- Born: Manop Sampaosuk มานพ สำเภาสุข; December 22, 1971 (age 54); Lam Narai, Chai Badan, Lopburi, Thailand
- Other names: Noppadet Narumon (นพเดช นฤมล); Nopadej Sakmuangklang (นพเดช ศักดิ์เมืองแกลง)
- Nickname: Knight of Singha City (อัศวินเมืองสิงห์)
- Division: Super Bantamweight; Featherweight
- Style: Muay Femur
- Stance: Southpaw
- Years active: 1980s-1994

Noppadet Sor.Rewadee (Thai: นพเดช ศ.เรวดี), is a Thai former professional Muay Thai fighter. He was the Rajadamnern Stadium Featherweight Champion in 1993 and was active during the 1980s and 1990s.

== Biography and career ==
His gained his nickname the "Knight of Singha City" by making his name as a top fighter at Narumon gym in Sing Buri, the province neighboring his home province of Lopburi in Central Thailand.

He is most known for being one of only four fighters to have beaten Somrak Kamsing during his Muay Thai career in Bangkok. As the fight was at 105 lbs and Somrak grew into his frame faster than Noppadet, they never rematched in the following years.

In 1989, after a run at Bantamweight and Super Bantamweight where he defeated Langsuan, Dokmaipa, Detduang, and Wangchannoi, Noppadet was pushed up to Featherweight and matched with a bigger and more experienced Jaroenthong Kiatbanchong, who gave him a big cut on the forehead and cruised to a decision victory. The loss proved to be tough on the 18-year-old Noppadet who fell into a long slump as he went 2-11-1 from July, 1989 to December, 1990.

In 1990, Mr. Komcharoen Kaikaew and Ms. Rewadee Pattapong bought out Noppadet's contract from Narumon gym and brought him to Sor.Rewadee gym to fight under "Sia Nao" Virat Vachirarattanawong's Petchyindee Promotion that was operating at Rajadamnern Stadium.

Soon after joining his new gym, Noppadet broke out of his slump and had a career resurgence culminating in him winning the Rajadamnern Stadium Featherweight title in his third fight against Wanwiset Kaennorasing. He would lose his title against Wanwiset in their fifth fight and retired after going on a losing streak in 1994 at 23 years old.

He was one of a few fighters to have a purse as high as ฿150,000 Thai baht, which he earned against Jaroenthong Kiatbanchong, and despite retiring at an early age, he fought against many notable fighters such as Chamuekpet Hapalang, Somrak Kamsing, Wangchannoi Sor.Palangchai, Jaroenthong Kiatbanchong, Langsuan Panyuthaphum, Veeraphol Sahaprom, Namkabuan Nongkeepahuyuth, Boonlai Sor.Thanikul, Dokmaipa Por.Pongsawang, Rajasak Sor.Vorapin, Wanwiset Kaennorasing, Kangwannoi Or.Sribualoi, Yodpetch Sor.Jitpattana, Kuekrit Sor.Nayaiam, Wanghin Por.Chaiwat, and Detduang Por.Pongsawang.

After his fighting career, Noppadet still involved himself in the industry as a trainer and helped to organize Muay Thai events in the Thai countryside.

In 2021, Samart Payakaroon, alongside Kiapetch Promotion's Chun Kiatpetch and other notable figures organized a charity event sponsored by Chang Beer in Sing Buri to raise money for Noppadet to treat Glaucoma in his left eye.

== Titles and honours ==
Rajadamnern Stadium

- 1993 Rajadamnern Stadium Featherweight (126 lbs) Champion

== Fight record ==
Muay Thai Record (Incomplete)
Date	Result	Opponent	Event	Location	Method	Round	Time
1995-12-28	Loss	(Thailand) Sritrang Sor.Damrongchai	Rajadamnern Stadium	Bangkok, Thailand	Decision	5	3:00
1995-08-19	Loss	(Thailand) Chingchai Sakdarun	Rosso Tournament, Final - Omnoi Stadium	Samut Sakhon, Thailand	Decision	5	3:00
For the Rosso Million Baht Tournament title.
1995-01-25	Loss	(Thailand) Wanwiset Kaennorasing	Rajadamnern Stadium	Bangkok, Thailand	Decision	5	3:00
1994-12-24		(Thailand) Rainbow Sor.Prantalay	Lumpinee Stadium	Bangkok, Thailand			
1994-10-17	Loss	(Thailand) Rainbow Sor.Prantalay	Rajadamnern Stadium	Bangkok, Thailand	Decision	5	3:00
1994-09-	Win	(Thailand) Kaonar Sor.Kettalingchan	Rajadamnern Stadium	Bangkok, Thailand	Decision	5	3:00
1994-05-04	Loss	(Thailand) Wanwiset Kaennorasing	Rajadamnern Stadium	Bangkok, Thailand	Decision	5	3:00
For the Rajadamnern Stadium Featherweight (126 lbs) title.
1994-02-23	Loss	(Thailand) Banluedet Lukprabaht	Rajadamnern Stadium	Bangkok, Thailand	Decision	5	3:00
1994-01-12	Loss	(Thailand) Wanwiset Kaennorasing	Rajadamnern Stadium	Bangkok, Thailand	Decision	5	3:00
Loses the Rajadamnern Stadium Featherweight (126 lbs) title.
1993-12-07	Win	(Thailand) M16 Bor.Khor.Sor.	Rajadamnern Stadium	Bangkok, Thailand	Decision	5	3:00
1993-10-18	Loss	(Thailand) Buakaw Sit Sor.Wor.Por	Rajadamnern Stadium	Bangkok, Thailand	Decision	5	3:00
1993-09-16	Win	(Thailand) Saenkeng Pinsinchai	Rajadamnern Stadium	Bangkok, Thailand	Decision	5	3:00
1993-08-18	Win	(Thailand) Wanwiset Kaennorasing	Rajadamnern Stadium	Bangkok, Thailand	Decision	5	3:00
Wins the Rajadamnern Stadium Featherweight (126 lbs) title.
1993-07-19	Win	(Thailand) Seesod Keatchidchanok	Rajadamnern Stadium	Bangkok, Thailand	Decision	5	3:00
1993-06-23	Win	(Thailand) Chamuekpet Chorchamuang	Rajadamnern Stadium	Bangkok, Thailand	Decision	5	3:00
1993-05-22	Win	(Thailand) Wisanlek Lukbangplasoi	Omnoi Stadium	Samut Sakhon, Thailand	Decision	5	3:00
1993-04	Loss	(Thailand) Saentor Kiatmuanggan	Rajadamnern Stadium	Bangkok, Thailand	Decision	5	3:00
1993-02-19	Loss	(Thailand) Changnoi Srimongkol	Rajadamnern Stadium	Bangkok, Thailand	Decision	5	3:00
1993-01-20	Win	(Thailand) Kuekrit Sor.Nayaiam	Rajadamnern Stadium	Bangkok, Thailand	Decision	5	3:00
1992-10-28	Loss	(Thailand) Wanwiset Kaennorasing	Rajadamnern Stadium	Bangkok, Thailand	Decision	5	3:00
1992-03-18	Loss	(Thailand) Veeraphol Sahaprom	Rajadamnern Stadium	Bangkok, Thailand	KO (Right hook)	3	
1992-02-19	Win	(Thailand) Rajasak Sor.Vorapin	Rajadamnern Stadium	Bangkok, Thailand	Decision	5	3:00
1992-01-15	Win	(Thailand) Veeraphol Sahaprom	Rajadamnern Stadium	Bangkok, Thailand	Decision	5	3:00
1991-10-30	Loss	(Thailand) Kuekrit Sor.Nayaiam	Rajadamnern Stadium	Bangkok, Thailand	KO (Head kick)	1	
1991-09-20	Win	(Thailand) Kangwannoi Or.Sribualoi	Rajadamnern Stadium	Bangkok, Thailand	Decision	5	3:00
1991-08-23	Win	(Thailand) Kangwannoi Or.Sribualoi	Rajadamnern Stadium	Bangkok, Thailand	Decision	5	3:00
1991-06-24	Loss	(Thailand) Kangwannoi Or.Sribualoi	Rajadamnern Stadium	Bangkok, Thailand	Decision	5	3:00
1991-05-08	Loss	(Thailand) Santos Devy	Rajadamnern Stadium	Bangkok, Thailand	Decision	5	3:00
1991-03-21	Win	(Thailand) Santos Devy	Rajadamnern Stadium	Bangkok, Thailand	Decision	5	3:00
1991-02-21	Win	(Thailand) Wanghin Por.Chaiwat	Rajadamnern Stadium	Bangkok, Thailand	Decision	5	3:00
1990-12-10	Loss	(Thailand) Veeraphol Sahaprom	Rajadamnern Stadium	Bangkok, Thailand	Decision	5	3:00
1990-11-15	Win	(Thailand) Kanongmek Sitsei	Rajadamnern Stadium	Bangkok, Thailand	Decision	5	3:00
1990-10-22	Loss	(Thailand) Daotai Kiatpratuang	Rajadamnern Stadium	Bangkok, Thailand	Decision	5	3:00
1990-09-27	Loss	(Thailand) Veeraphol Sahaprom	Rajadamnern Stadium	Bangkok, Thailand	Decision	5	3:00
1990-08-30	Loss	(Thailand) Veeraphol Sahaprom	Rajadamnern Stadium	Bangkok, Thailand	Decision	5	3:00
1990-07-19	Win	(Thailand) Suwitsaklek Lukbangplasoi	Rajadamnern Stadium	Bangkok, Thailand	Decision	5	3:00
1990-05-17	Loss	(Thailand) Yodpetch Sor.Jitpattana	Lumpinee Stadium	Bangkok, Thailand	KO	3	
1990-03-23	Loss	(Thailand) Namkabuan Nongkeepahuyuth	Lumpinee Stadium	Bangkok, Thailand	Decision	5	3:00
1990-03-02	Draw	(Thailand) Detduang Por.Pongsawang	Lumpinee Stadium	Bangkok, Thailand	Decision	5	3:00
1989-12-26	Loss	(Thailand) Kangwannoi Or.Sribualoi	Lumpinee Stadium	Bangkok, Thailand	Decision	5	3:00
1989-11-07	Loss	(Thailand) Boonlai Sor.Thanikul	Lumpinee Stadium	Bangkok, Thailand	Decision	5	3:00
1989-10-17	Loss	(Thailand) Grandprixnoi Muangchaiyapum	Lumpinee Stadium	Bangkok, Thailand	Decision	5	3:00
1989-08-29	Loss	(Thailand) Wangchannoi Sor.Palangchai	Lumpinee Stadium	Bangkok, Thailand	KO	2	
1989-07-25	Loss	(Thailand) Jaroenthong Kiatbanchong	Lumpinee Stadium	Bangkok, Thailand	Decision	5	3:00
1989-06-30	Win	(Thailand) Wangchannoi Sor.Palangchai	Lumpinee Stadium	Bangkok, Thailand	Decision	5	3:00
1989-05-02	Win	(Thailand) Detduang Por.Pongsawang	Lumpinee Stadium	Bangkok, Thailand	KO	3	
1989-03-10	Win	(Thailand) Dokmaipa Por Pongsawang	Lumpinee Stadium	Bangkok, Thailand	Decision	5	3:00
1989-01-27	Win	(Thailand) Langsuan Panyuthaphum	Lumpinee Stadium	Bangkok, Thailand	Decision	5	3:00
1988-12-09	Win	(Thailand) Khwanjai Chor.Wego	Lumpinee Stadium	Bangkok, Thailand	Decision	5	3:00
1988-11-11	Win	(Thailand) Klaichit Piyaphan	Lumpinee Stadium	Bangkok, Thailand	Decision	5	3:00
1988-10-18	Draw	(Thailand) Dentaksin Kiattrathapol	Lumpinee Stadium	Bangkok, Thailand	Decision	5	3:00
1988-09-13	NC	(Thailand) Huaykaewnoi Sor.Korakot	Lumpinee Stadium	Bangkok, Thailand	NC (Opponent disqualified)	5	
1988-08-26	Win	(Thailand) Thongsabat Piyaphan	Lumpinee Stadium	Bangkok, Thailand	Decision	5	3:00
1988-07-30	Win	(Thailand) Wirachanoi Kiattrathapol	Lumpinee Stadium	Bangkok, Thailand	Decision	5	3:00
1988-06-12	Loss	(Thailand) Dentaksin Kiattrathapol	Lumpinee Stadium	Bangkok, Thailand	Decision	5	3:00
1988-05-17	Win	(Thailand) Phanomrung Sunthornkiat	Lumpinee Stadium	Bangkok, Thailand	Decision	5	3:00
1988-03-29	Loss	(Thailand) Huaykaewnoi Sor.Korakot	Lumpinee Stadium	Bangkok, Thailand	Decision	5	3:00
1988-03-01	Win	(Thailand) Yokphet Chor.Wego	Lumpinee Stadium	Bangkok, Thailand	Decision	5	3:00
1988-02-12	Win	(Thailand) Taweesaklek Ploysakda	Lumpinee Stadium	Bangkok, Thailand	KO	4	
1988-01-22	Draw	(Thailand) Nuengthoranee Petchyindee	Lumpinee Stadium	Bangkok, Thailand	Decision	5	3:00
1987-	Win	(Thailand) Pimaranlek Sitaran	Lumpinee Stadium	Bangkok, Thailand	Decision	5	3:00
Legend: Win Loss Draw/No contest Notes
