= Taweesaklek Ploysakda =

Thai former professional Muay Thai fighter

- Born: Suthon Khampakdee; October 3, 1968 (age 58); Tha Phon, Mueang Phetchabun, Phetchabun, Thailand
- Native name: สุธน คำภัคดี
- Nickname: Sadist (ไอ้ซาดิสม์)
- Division: Bantamweight
- Style: Muay Thai (Muay Bouk)
- Stance: Orthodox
- Team: Ploysakda; Petchyindee
- Years active: c. 1980–1992

Other information
- Occupation: Muay Thai trainer

Suthon Khampakdee (Thai: สุธน คำภัคดี; born October 3, 1968), known professionally as Taweesaklek Ploysakda (Thai: ทวีศักดิ์เล็ก พลอยศักดา), is a Thai former professional Muay Thai fighter. He is a former Lumpinee Stadium Bantamweight Champion who was active during the 1980s and 1990s.

== Biography and career ==
He trained at the Ploysakda gym.

He fought during the Golden Era of Muay Thai against many notable fighters including Samson Isaan, Kaensak Sor.Ploenjit, Langsuan Panyuthaphum, Saenklai SitKruOd, Mathee Jadeepitak, and Kangwannoi Or.Sribualoi.

His fight against Samson on June, 26th 1992 was the last of his career. Samson’s strikes would aggravate an old injury to his left eye which four surgeries could not heal.

== Titles and honours ==
- Lumpinee Stadium
  - 1990 Lumpinee Stadium Bantamweight (118 lbs) Champion
    - One successful title defense

== Fight record ==
Muay Thai Record (Incomplete)
Date	Result	Opponent	Event	Location	Method	Round	Time
1992-06-26	Loss	(Thailand) Saenmuangnoi Lukjaopormehasak	Lumpinee Stadium	Bangkok, Thailand	KO	2	
1992-06-02	Win	(Thailand) Saenklai SitKruOd	Lumpinee Stadium	Bangkok, Thailand	Decision	5	3:00
1992-05-08	Win	(Thailand) Thongsawath Piyapal	Lumpinee Stadium	Bangkok, Thailand	TKO (leg kicks)	2	
1992-04-10	Win	(Thailand) Thongsawath Piyapal	Lumpinee Stadium	Bangkok, Thailand	Decision	5	3:00
1991-12-	Loss	(Thailand) Jaroensak Kiatnakornchon	Lumpinee Stadium	Bangkok, Thailand	Decision	5	3:00
1991-08-02	Loss	(Thailand) Saenklai SitKruOd	Lumpinee Stadium	Bangkok, Thailand	KO (punches)	3	
1991-06-18	Loss	(Thailand) Saenklai SitKruOd	Lumpinee Stadium	Bangkok, Thailand	Decision	5	3:00
Loses the Lumpinee Stadium Bantamweight (118 lbs) title.
1991-03-19	Loss	(Thailand) Kaensak Sor.Ploenjit	Lumpinee Stadium	Bangkok, Thailand	Decision	5	3:00
1990-12-26	Loss	(Thailand) Kaensak Sor.Ploenjit	Rajadamnern Stadium	Bangkok, Thailand	Decision	5	3:00
1990-09-07	Win	(Thailand) Kangwannoi Or.Sribualoi	Lumpinee Stadium	Bangkok, Thailand	Decision	5	3:00
Defends the Lumpinee Stadium Bantamweight (118 lbs) title.
1990-07-24	Win	(Thailand) Kangwannoi Or.Sribualoi	Lumpinee Stadium	Bangkok, Thailand	Decision	5	3:00
Wins the Lumpinee Stadium Bantamweight (118 lbs) title.
1990-06-26	Win	(Thailand) Langsuan Panyuthaphum	Lumpinee Stadium	Bangkok, Thailand	Decision	5	3:00
1990-05-11	Win	(Thailand) Suwitlek Lukbangplasoi	Lumpinee Stadium	Bangkok, Thailand	Decision	5	3:00
1990-04-06	Win	(Thailand) Kwangthong Por.Chaiwat		Bangkok, Thailand	KO	4	
1990-03-23	Win	(Thailand) Phanomrung Sitbanjong	Lumpinee Stadium	Bangkok, Thailand	KO	4	
1990-02-27	Loss	(Thailand) Phanomrung Sitbanjong	Lumpinee Stadium	Bangkok, Thailand	Decision	5	3:00
1990-02-13	Win	(Thailand) Kwangthong Por.Chaiwat	Lumpinee Stadium	Bangkok, Thailand	Decision	5	3:00
1990-01-15	Win	(Thailand) Mathee Jadeepitak	Rajadamnern Stadium	Bangkok, Thailand	KO	4	
1989-12-26	Win	(Thailand) Kaewao Kor.Phongkiat		Thailand	Decision	5	3:00
1989-12-23	Win	(Thailand) Phajonsuek Kiattiangtrang		Thailand	Decision	5	3:00
1989-12-04	Win	(Thailand) Chakrachai Narumon		Phetchabun, Thailand	Decision	5	3:00
1989-11-18	Win	(Thailand) Paiboon Narumon		Thailand	Decision	5	3:00
1989-08-26	Loss	(Thailand) San Narumon		Thailand	Decision	5	3:00
1989-06-30	Loss	(Thailand) Phanomrung Suntornkiat	Lumpinee Stadium	Bangkok, Thailand	KO	5	
1989-06-03	Loss	(Thailand) Graiwannoi Sitkruod		Thailand	KO	3	
1989-03-11	Win	(Thailand) Phanomrung Suntornkiat		Thailand	Decision	5	3:00
1989-02-11	Loss	(Thailand) Phanomrung Suntornkiat		Thailand	Decision	5	3:00
1989-01-22	Loss	(Thailand) Chakrachai Narumon		Thailand	Decision	5	3:00
1988-02-12	Loss	(Thailand) Noppadet Narumon	Lumpinee Stadium	Bangkok, Thailand	KO	4	
1987-12-22	Win	(Thailand) Phalangrit Kiattibunthanom	Lumpinee Stadium	Bangkok, Thailand	Decision	5	3:00
Legend: Win Loss Draw/No contest Notes
