= Lakhin Wassantasit =

Thai Muay Thai fighter and professional boxer

- Born: Wichit Lapmee; April 17, 1972 (age 54); Khanom, Thailand
- Native name: วิชิต ลาภมี
- Other names: Lakhin CP Gym; Lakhin Sor Saraythong (หลักหิน ส.สาหร่ายทอง); Lakhin Sitkamnanchucheep (หลักหิน ศิษย์กำนันชูชีพ); Lakhin Sakjawee (หลักหิน ศักดิ์จ่าวี)
- Nickname: Fist of Yama (ไอ้หมัดพญายม)
- Height: 163 cm (5 ft 4 in)
- Division: Super Flyweight; Bantamweight; Featherweight; Light Welterweight
- Style: Muay Thai (Muay Mat)
- Stance: Orthodox
- Team: Por.Chaiwat; Sor.Saraythong; Thailand Lakhin Sakjavee; Sitkanmnanchuchit; Galaxy Boxing Promotion
- Years active: c. 1981-1998; 2003-2005

Professional boxing record
- Total: 29
- Wins: 27
- By knockout: 18
- Losses: 0
- Draws: 2

Other information
- Occupation: Muay Thai trainer
- Boxing record from BoxRec

Wichit Lapmee (Thai: วิชิต ลาภมี; born 17 April 1972), known professionally as Lakhin Wassantasit or Lakhin CP Gym (Thai: หลักหิน วสันตสิทธิ์, หลักหิน ซีพียิม), is a Thai former Muay Thai fighter and professional boxer. He is a former Rajadamnern Stadium champion, as well as a WBA Bantamweight title challenger in boxing, who was famous in the 1990s and 2000s.

== Career ==
=== Muay Thai ===
Lakhin started Muay Thai training at the age of 9, inspired by a fighter from his native province of Nakhon Si Thammarat. He went to Bangkok at the age of 13, staying at the Borkahiwat gym first and then moving to the Por.Chaiwat gym at 17. In 1991 his Muay Thai career was peaking when Lakhin defeated Dennuea Denmolee and won the Rajadamnern Super Flyweight (115 lbs) title by a second-round knockout, a title he defended twice including in his victory over Burklerk Pinsinchai for the prestigious 1992 Isuzu Cup. The famed trilogy vs Samson Isaan would follow as part of a bid for the 1992 Sports Writer's Fighter of the Year, which ultimately Jaroensap Kiatbanchong would win. In 1993 he Lakhin would leave Muay Thai for professional boxing for a decade, but returning again to Muay Thai at the age of 31 going onto win the Omnoi Stadium and the WMC World Title at 140 lbs.

=== Boxing ===
In professional boxing, he fought under Niwat Laosuwanwat's Galaxy Boxing Promotion—the same stable as the famed Khaosai Galaxy. On May 27, 1995, he had the chance to challenge fellow Thai WBA Bantamweight world champion Daorung Chuvatana in his native Nakhon Si Thammarat, aiming to become the first world champion from southern Thailand. After 12 rounds, the bout was declared a draw, despite criticisms suggesting he was more likely to have lost. Lakhin won both the PAPA and OPBF titles at Bantamweight, and finished his pro boxing career undefeated with a record of 27-0-2, with 18 knockouts.

== Titles and accomplishments ==
=== Muay Thai ===
- Rajadamnern Stadium
  - 1991 Rajadamnern Super Flyweight (115 lbs) Champion
    - Two successful defenses
  - 1991 Rajadamnern Stadium Fighter of the Year
  - 1992 3rd Isuzu Cup Tournament Winner
- Omnoi Stadium
  - 2004 Omnoi Stadium Light Welterweight (140 lbs) Champion
  - 2004 Tam Jai Tournament Light Welterweight (140 lbs) Winner
- World Muay Thai Council
  - 2005 WMC World Light Welterweight (140 lbs) Champion

=== Boxing ===
- PABA Bantamweight Title (1996)
  - Five successful defenses
- OPBF Bantamweight Title (1995)

== Professional boxing record ==
29 fights	27 wins	0 losses
By knockout	18	0
By decision	9	0
Draws	2	

No.	Result	Record	Opponent	Type	Round	Date	Location	Notes
29	Win	27-0-2	Abbas Amami	UD	6	27 Jan 2006	Nakhon Si Thammarat, Thailand	
28	Win	26-0-2	Roel Mangan	KO	4 (6)	31 Oct 2005	Bangkok, Thailand	
27	Win	25-0-2	Edwin Gastador	UD	6	31 Aug 2005	Rajadamnern Stadium, Bangkok, Thailand	
26	Win	24-0-2	Dodie Boy Agrabio	UD	6	25 July 2005	Por Kungpao Restaurant, Bangkok, Thailand	
25	Win	23-0-2	Joel Junio	TKO	3 (10)	18 Jan 1998	Provincial Stadium, Phetchaburi, Thailand	
24	Win	22-0-2	Joven Jorda	TKO	5 (10)	21 Dec 1997	Phraram 9 Plaza, Bangkok, Thailand	
23	Win	21-0-2	Aidos Yeraliyev	KO	4 (12)	1 May 1997	Rajadamnern Stadium, Bangkok, Thailand	Retained PABA Bantamweight title.
22	Win	20-0-2	Alexander Tiranov	TD	8 (12)	6 Mar 1997	Yasothorn, Thailand	Retained PABA Bantamweight title.
21	Win	19-0-2	Edwin Casano	KO	4 (10)	11 Jan 1997	Provincial Gymnasium, Sa Kaeo, Thailand	
20	Draw	18-0-2	Abraham Torres	TD	9 (12)	21 Sep 1996	Siam Jusco Shopping Center, Nonthaburi, Thailand	Retained PABA Bantamweight title.
19	Win	18-0-1	Juan Luis Torres	TKO	7 (12)	6 July 1996	National Stadium Gymnasium, Bangkok, Thailand	Retained PABA Bantamweight title.
18	Win	17-0-1	Jovy Chan	KO	2 (12)	19 May 1996	Mahachai Villa Arena, Samut Sakhon, Thailand	Retained PABA Bantamweight title.
17	Win	16-0-1	Martin Solorio	KO	2 (12)	19 Mar 1996	PATA Shopping Center, Huamark, Bangkok, Thailand	Won vacant PABA Bantamweight title.
16	Win	15-0-1	Ric Ramirez	PTS	10	31 Jan 1996	Bangkok, Thailand	
15	Win	14-0-1	Ernesto Urdaniza	KO	6 (?)	18 Nov 1995	Bangkok, Thailand	
14	Win	13-0-1	Arman Molina	PTS	10	14 Oct 1995	Bangkok, Thailand	
13	Win	12-0-1	Alberto Filinio	KO	4 (12)	27 Aug 1995	Bangkok, Thailand	
12	Draw	11-0-1	Daorung Chuwatana	SD	12	27 May 1995	Provincial Stadium, Nakhon Si Thammarat, Thailand	For WBA Bantamweight title.
11	Win	11-0	Visuth Chuvatana	UD	12	4 Feb 1995	Channel 5 Studio, Bangkok, Thailand	Won OPBF Bantamweight title.
10	Win	10-0	Han Yong Kim	KO	3 (?)	5 Nov 1994	Chira Nakorn Stadium, Hat Yai, Thailand	
9	Win	9-0	Ricky Gayamo	KO	2 (?)	1 Oct 1994	Channel 7 Studios, Bangkok, Thailand	
8	Win	8-0	Jaime Banggot	KO	1 (?)	27 Aug 1994	Channel 7 Studios, Bangkok, Thailand	
7	Win	7-0	Joel Junio	KO	6 (?)	27 June 1994	Rajadamnern Stadium, Bangkok, Thailand	
6	Win	6-0	Rolando Valentin	KO	2 (10)	1 May 1994	Rajadamnern Stadium, Bangkok, Thailand	
5	Win	5-0	Luis Alberto Vargas	UD	10	26 Mar 1994	Physical Education College, Chonburi, Thailand	
4	Win	4-0	Dan Nietes	PTS	10	23 Jan 1994	Provincial Stadium, Surat Thani, Thailand	
3	Win	3-0	Joe Juan	KO	4 (?)	22 Dec 1993	Bangkok, Thailand	
2	Win	2-0	Lorence Fongco	KO	2 (?)	27 Nov 1993	Bangkok, Thailand	
1	Win	1-0	Joel Junio	KO	2 (?)	8 Nov 1993	Bangkok, Thailand	

== Muay Thai record ==
Muay Thai Record
Date	Result	Opponent	Event	Location	Method	Round	Time
2013-07-21	Win	(Thailand) Nungubon Sitlerchai		Bangkok, Thailand	Decision	5	3:00
2013-01-21	Loss	(Thailand) Jaroensap Kiatbanchong		Nakhon Si Thammarat, Thailand	Decision	5	3:00
2006-04-10	Loss	(Thailand) Sagatpetch IngramGym	Petchthongkam, Rajadamnern Stadium	Bangkok, Thailand	Decision	5	3:00
2005-05-12	Win	(Thailand) Jaroenchai Jor.Rachada	Rajadamnern Stadium	Bangkok, Thailand	KO		
Wins the vacant WMC World Light Welterweight (140 lbs) title.
2004-12-23	Loss	(Thailand) Yodsanklai Fairtex	Daorungchujarean, Rajadamnern Stadium	Bangkok, Thailand	Decision	5	3:00
2004-11-	Win	(Thailand) Saiyoknoi Sakchainarong	Omnoi Stadium, Tam Jai Tournament Final	Samut Sakhon, Thailand	KO (Punches)	2	
Wins Tam Jai Tournament and Omnoi Stadium Light Welterweight (140 lbs) title.
2004-09-11	Win	(Thailand) Robert Por.Cherdkiat	Omnoi StadiumTam Jai Tournament Semifinal	Samut Sakhon, Thailand	KO (Punches)	3	
2004-08-07	Win	(Thailand) Yodkhunseuk Sit Kriangkrai	Omnoi Stadium, Tam Jai Tournament	Samut Sakhon, Thailand	Decision	5	3:00
2004-	Win	(Thailand) Robert Por.Cherdkiat	Omnoi Stadium, Tam Jai Tournament	Samut Sakhon, Thailand	Decision	5	3:00
2004-07-14	Loss	(Thailand) Yodsanklai Fairtex	Daorungprabath, Rajadamnern Stadium	Bangkok, Thailand	Decision	5	3:00
2003-07-02	Win	(Thailand) Mankong Roylamantaput	Rajadamnern Stadium	Bangkok, Thailand	Decision	5	3:00
2002-08-31	Loss	(Thailand) Sagatpetch Sor.Sakulpan	Mitsubishi Tournament, Semifinals	Bangkok, Thailand	Decision	5	3:00
1993-07-18	Win	(Thailand) Petcharat Sor.Worapin	Rajadamnern Stadium	Bangkok, Thailand	Decision	5	3:00
1993-05-19	Loss	(Thailand) Silapathai Jockygym	Rajadamnern Stadium	Bangkok, Thailand	Decision	5	3:00
1993-03-23	Loss	(Thailand) Jaroensap Kiatbanchong	Rajadamnern Stadium	Bangkok, Thailand	Decision	5	3:00
1993-02-06	Win	(Thailand) Dokmaipa Por.Pongsawang	Lumpinee Stadium	Bangkok, Thailand	Decision	5	3:00
1993-01-08	Win	(Thailand) Dokmaipa Por.Pongsawang	Lumpinee Stadium	Bangkok, Thailand	Decision	5	3:00
1992-12-05	Win	(Thailand) Tukatathong Por.Pongsawang	Lumpinee Stadium	Bangkok, Thailand	Decision	5	3:00
1992-11-18	Win	(Thailand) Wicharn Sitsuchon	Rajadamnern Stadium	Bangkok, Thailand	KO (Right Cross)	2	
1992-09-28	Loss	(Thailand) Samson Isaan	Rajadamnern Stadium	Bangkok, Thailand	Decision	5	3:00
Lost the Rajadamnern Super Flyweight (115 lbs) title.
1992-08-04	Win	(Thailand) Samson Isaan	Lumpinee Stadium	Bangkok, Thailand	Decision	5	3:00
1992-06-29	Win	(Thailand) Jaroensak Kiatnakornchon	Rajadamnern Stadium	Bangkok, Thailand	Decision	5	3:00
1992-06-02	Win	(Thailand) Chartchainoi Chaorai-Oi	Lumpinee Stadium	Bangkok, Thailand	TKO (Doctor stoppage)	4	
1992-04-29	Loss	(Thailand) Samson Isaan	Rajadamnern Stadium	Bangkok, Thailand	Decision	5	3:00
1992-03-19	Win	(Thailand) Burklerk Pinsinchai	Rajadamnern Stadium, Isuzu Tournament Final	Bangkok, Thailand	Decision	5	3:00
Defends the Rajadamnern Super Flyweight (115 lbs) title and wins the Isuzu Cup Tournament.
1992-01-23	Win	(Thailand) Singnoi Sor.Prasatporn	Rajadamnern Stadium, Isuzu Tournament Semi Final	Bangkok, Thailand	Decision	5	3:00
Defends the Rajadamnern Super Flyweight (115 lbs) title.
1991-12-19	Win	(Thailand) Dennuea Denmolee	Rajadamnern Stadium, Isuzu Tournament	Bangkok, Thailand	KO	2	
Wins the Rajadamnern Super Flyweight (115 lbs) title.
1991-09-19	Win	(Thailand) Dejrit Sor.Ploenchit	Rajadamnern Stadium, Isuzu Tournament	Bangkok, Thailand	KO	4	
1991-08-15	Win	(Thailand) Burklerk Pinsinchai	Rajadamnern Stadium, Isuzu Tournament	Bangkok, Thailand	TKO (Punches)	1	
1991-06-26	Win	(Thailand) Pitilek Chipiphat	Rajadamnern Stadium, Isuzu Tournament	Bangkok, Thailand	Decision	5	3:00
1991-05-02	Win	(Thailand) Daoden Sor.Sukkasem	Rajadamnern Stadium	Bangkok, Thailand	KO	3	
1991-04-17	Loss	(Thailand) Kamron Sor.Vorapin	Rajadamnern Stadium	Bangkok, Thailand	Decision	5	3:00
1991-03-20	Win	(Thailand) Chamnan Saknarin	Rajadamnern Stadium	Bangkok, Thailand	KO	2	
1991-02-21	Loss	(Thailand) Daonapa Kiatsamran	Rajadamnern Stadium	Bangkok, Thailand	Decision	5	3:00
1991-01-30	Loss	(Thailand) Singnoi Sor.Prasatporn	Rajadamnern Stadium	Bangkok, Thailand	Decision	5	3:00
1991-01-10	Win	(Thailand) Supernoi Sor.Talingchan	Rajadamnern Stadium	Bangkok, Thailand	KO	4	
1990-12-20	Win	(Thailand) Lukyod Sor.Worapin	Rajadamnern Stadium	Bangkok, Thailand	KO	1	
1990-11-08	Loss	(Thailand) Singnoi Sor.Prasatporn	Rajadamnern Stadium	Bangkok, Thailand	Decision	5	3:00
1990-09-10	Win	(Thailand) Worawut Kiatbangpo		Bangkok, Thailand	Decision	5	3:00
1990-08-23	Win	(Thailand) Kamron Sor Vorapin	Rajadamnern Stadium	Bangkok, Thailand	Decision	5	3:00
1990-07-25	Loss	(Thailand) Falan Lukprabat	Rajadamnern Stadium	Bangkok, Thailand	Decision	5	3:00
1990-05-16	Win	(Thailand) Manasak Na Pattaya	Rajadamnern Stadium	Bangkok, Thailand	KO	3	
1990-04-19	Win	(Thailand) Manasak Na Pattaya		Bangkok, Thailand	Decision	5	3:00
1990-03-26	Win	(Thailand) Sanguansak Saknarin		Bangkok, Thailand	Decision	5	3:00
1990-01-11	Win	(Thailand) Saksri Yuttakit		Bangkok, Thailand	Decision	5	3:00
1989-09-07	Win	(Thailand) Mahalap Singchatchawan	Rajadamnern Stadium	Bangkok, Thailand	KO (Punches)	3	
1989-07-26	Loss	(Thailand) Mankong Sisomboon	Rajadamnern Stadium	Bangkok, Thailand	Decision	5	3:00
1989-07-08	Loss	(Thailand) Robert Kaennorasing	Rajadamnern Stadium	Bangkok, Thailand	Decision	5	3:00
1989-05-18	Win	(Thailand) Malako Sor Tapsakon	Rajadamnern Stadium	Bangkok, Thailand	Decision	5	3:00
1989-03-23	Win	(Thailand) Kwanmuangnoi Kaengarnpitak	Rajadamnern Stadium	Bangkok, Thailand	Decision	5	3:00
1989-02-09	Loss	(Thailand) Yokpetch Lukprabat	Rajadamnern Stadium	Bangkok, Thailand	Decision	5	3:00
Lakhin's first fight in a Bangkok satdium.
1989-01-15	Loss	(Thailand) Robert Kaennorasing	Crocodile Farm	Samut Prakan, Thailand	Decision	5	3:00
Legend: Win Loss Draw/No contest Notes
