= Isuzu Cup (Muay Thai) =

Thai boxing tournament

The Isuzu Cup, also known as the Isuzu Tournament, or the Isuzu Cup Tournament was traditionally an 8-man Muay Thai tournament which took place at Siam Omnoi Stadium in Samut Sakhon every year. It is now a 6-team tournament held by Thai Fight. The tournament is organized by the Tri-Petch Group, owned by Isuzu Motors Ltd., and sanctioned by the Sports Authority of Thailand. It is the most prestigious and longest-standing tournament still active in the sport of Muay Thai.

== History ==
The first Isuzu tournament started in late 1990 under the management of Damrong Puttan and Songchai Rattanasuban at Omnoi Stadium. The final took place in early 1991 where Rattananoi Tansarinkhan won a decision over Weesanusak Wor.Weerakul.

In 1991, the tournament was moved to Samrong Stadium in Samrong, Ubon Ratchathani, under the management of local promoter Anucha Wacharatangka, the manager of eventual tournament-runner-up Yodkhunpon Sittraiphum.

In 1992, the tournament was once again moved, this time to Rajadamnern Stadium and would be managed by Pol. Col. Sewak Pinsinchai, the owner of Pinsinchai Gym and Asawindam ("Black Knight") promotion, and manager of eventual tournament-runner-up Burklerk Pinsinchai.

In 1994, the Isuzu Cup tournament returned to its original location at Omnoi Stadium and would be under the management of Chain Muangchon (Wirat Praianan) - the main promoter of the stadium, - until 2023.

In 2011, as the Tri-Petch Group became a sponsor of the new Thai Fight promotion, which aims for higher-weight talent, the tournament weight was raised to over 135 lbs for the first time. The winner of the Isuzu Cup, Kem Sitsongpeenong was entered into the second edition of the Thai Fight Tournament, which he ultimately won against Fabio Pinca, the winner of the first Thai Fight Tournament in 2010.

From 2012 until 2024, the winner of the Isuzu Tournament would have to participate in the Isuzu Cup Super Fight in order to qualify for the Thai Fight Tournament.

No tournament was held in 2022 due to the COVID-19 pandemic.

In 2023, the tournament was moved away from Siam Omnoi Stadium for the first time since 1993, as it was entirely fought in a studio at BITEC Bangna in the Thai Fight promotion. The tournament format was overhauled in the following year.

== Tournament progression ==
The Isuzu Cup Tournament is divided into three stages, starting with the Group Stage, in which the eight participants are divided into two groups accordingly called Group A and B. Each fighters has to fight all of the other members in his group and accumulate points before being able to move onto the next stage. The point system:

- 0 points for a loss
- 1 point for a draw
- 2 points for a decision win
- 3 points for a (technical) knockout win or decision win with a big cut on the opponent

The two fighters with the most points in each group will move on to the second stage, the Semi-finals, with the following match-ups:

- Group A winner vs Group B runner-up
- Group B winner vs Group A runner-up

The last stage is the tournament Final, which pits the winners of the Semi-finals against each other.

=== Format change (since 2024) ===
In 2024, the format was changed. Each region of Thailand would put forward a team of three fighters, one for each contested weight: 143, 147, and 152 lbs. Six teams—Upper Isan, Lower Isan, North, Central, East, and South—were assembled, and the representatives of each team fought against representatives of rival teams to earn points:

- 0 points for a loss
- 1 point for a draw
- 2 points for a decision win
- 3 points for a (technical) knockout win

The four teams with the most points will meet each other in the Semi-finals, and the winning teams will move onto the Final.

=== Prize ===
As of 2020:

- The Isuzu Cup champion is awarded ฿1,000,000 Thai baht, and an Isuzu D-Max pickup truck. Additionally, they will have to participate in the Isuzu Cup Super Fight.
- The runner-up is awarded ฿500,000 Thai baht.
- Third place is awarded ฿300,000 Thai baht, and fourth place is awarded ฿200,000 Thai baht.

== Tournament winners ==
N°	Year	Winner	Runner-up	Weight	Notes
1	1990	(Thailand) Rattananoi Tansaringkhan	(Thailand) Weesanusak Wor.Weerakul	N/A	
2	1991	(Thailand) Robert Kaennorasing	(Thailand) Yodkhunpon Sittraiphum	116 lbs	Held at Samrong Stadium in Ubon Ratchathani.
3	1992	(Thailand) Lakhin Wassantasit	(Thailand) Burklerk Pinsinchai	115 lbs	Held at Rajadamnern Stadium.
4	1994	(Thailand) Malaitong Saktewan	(Thailand) Jaruad Manwoot	N/A	The tournament was moved back to Omnoi Stadium.
5	1995	(Thailand) MuayEk Kiatchaiyong	(Thailand) Morakot Sor.Thamarangsi	N/A	
6	1996	(Thailand) Suwitlek Sor.Kaokarat	(Thailand) Chanchai Sor.Thammrangsri	135 lbs	
7	1997	(Thailand) Anantasak Panyuthaphum	(Thailand) Singdam Or.Ukrit	126 lbs	
8	1998	(Thailand) Samingdet Chor.Watcharin	(Thailand) Petchawang Aborigin	N/A	
9	1999	(Thailand) Manja Kiatnapachai	(Thailand) Detpanom Lukprabaht	N/A	
10	2000	(Thailand) Saengmorakot Sor.Ploenchit	(Thailand) Ittidet Sor.Boonya	N/A	
11	2001	(Thailand) Saenchernglek Jirakriangkrai	(Thailand) Pokaew Sitchafuang	115 lbs	
12	2002	(Thailand) Pinsiam Sor.Amnuaysirichok	(Thailand) Wansongkram Or.Phanatnikhom	118 lbs	
13	2003	(Thailand) Panomrunglek Kiatmuu9	(Thailand) Wanwiset Lukbanyai	108 lbs	Due to a draw in the initial Final, the two had to fight again to decide the tournament winner.
14	2004	(Thailand) Anuwat Kaewsamrit	(Thailand) Duwao Kongudom	122 lbs	Anuwat won the Sports Authority and Sports Writers Fighter of the Year Award in that year.
15	2005	(Thailand) Surasing Nongkeepahuyuth	(Thailand) Sittisak Sit-Or	118 lbs	
16	2006	(Thailand) Rakkiat Kiatprapat	(Thailand) Rittichak Kaewsamrit	118 lbs	
17	2007	(Thailand) Phet-Ek Sitjaopho	(Thailand) Longern Pitakruchaidan	125 lbs	
18	2008	(Thailand) Rungruanglek Lukprabat	(Thailand) Manasak Narupai	118 lbs	
19	2009	(Thailand) Yodtuanthong Wiramanokul	(Thailand) Parnpet Chor Na Phatthalung	130 lbs	
20	2010	(Thailand) Petchmankong Phetfergus	(Thailand) Saenchainoi Phumpanmuang	135 lbs	
21	2011	(Thailand) Kem Sitsongpeenong	(Thailand) Nopparat Keatkhamtorn	148 lbs	First year of Thai Fight partnership, hence the tournament weight increase for following years.
22	2012	(Thailand) Singmanee Kaewsamrit	(Thailand) Superbon Lukjaomaesaivaree	145 lbs	
23	2013	(Thailand) Fahmongkol Sor.Jor.Danrayong	(Thailand) Sinmanut Sor.Sarinya	140 lbs	
24	2014	(Thailand) Chanajon P.K.Saenchaigym	(Thailand) Ekchanachai Kaewsamrit	159 lbs	
25	2015	(Thailand) Rungrawee P.K.SaenchaiMuaythaiGym	(Thailand) Detrit Poptheratham	154 lbs	
26	2016	(Thailand) PTT Phetrungruang	(Thailand) Diesellek Pangkongprab	154 lbs	
27	2017	(Thailand) Aroondet Phetsupaphan	(Thailand) Duangsompong Nayok-A-Thasala	147 lbs	
28	2018	(Thailand) Satanfah Puicharleefresh	(Thailand) Chalampet Tor.Laksong	147 lbs	
29	2019	(Thailand) Petchmahachon Jitmuangnon	(Thailand) Ploywitthaya Petsimuen	138 lbs	
30	2020	(Thailand) Kongklai EnnyMuayThai	(Thailand) Prabsuk Si-Opal	140 lbs	Kongklai went on to win the SAT Fighter of the Year Award by unanimous vote.
31	2021	(Thailand) Petchthongchai T.B.M.Gym	(Thailand) Hercules Phetsimean	138 lbs	The final was delayed for nine months due to the COVID-19 pandemic.
The 32nd edition of the tournament planned for 2022 was postponed due to the COVID-19 pandemic. The tournament comes under the management of Thai Fight in 2023.
32	2023	(Thailand) Suksawat Sangmorakot	(Thailand) Thongchai Petruangrueng	143 lbs	The tournament was fought in Thai Fight studio in BITEC Bangna.
Tournament format overhaul comes into effect for the 33rd edition of the tournament.
33	2024	(Thailand) Klasuek Arwutfightgear (North Team)	(Thailand) Petchpakmai Chor.Chanamuaythai (Central Team)	143 lbs	The North Team defeated the Central Team 3–0, earning a unanimous victory. The tournament finals were held outdoors under heavy rain due to a monsoon in Thailand.
33	2024	(Thailand) Samurai Si-Opal (North Team)	(Thailand) Yodthewin Mor.Rajabhatchombueng (Central Team)	147 lbs	The North Team defeated the Central Team 3–0, earning a unanimous victory. The tournament finals were held outdoors under heavy rain due to a monsoon in Thailand.
33	2024	(Thailand) Worachaklek Kiatchatchai (North Team)	(Thailand) Chanachai Chor.Chanamuaythai (Central Team)	152 lbs	The North Team defeated the Central Team 3–0, earning a unanimous victory. The tournament finals were held outdoors under heavy rain due to a monsoon in Thailand.

== Rules ==
The tournament is conducted in Sports Authority of Thailand Muay Thai rules:

- Each fight consists of 5 rounds of 3 minutes with 2-minute breaks between each round.
- Fights can be won by decision, knockout, or technical knockout.
- Fights are conducted with 8 oz boxing gloves.

=== Since 2024 ===
The tournament is conducted under Thai Fight Kard Chuek rules:

- Each fight consists of 3 rounds of 3 minutes with 2-minute breaks between each round and the possibility of an extra round in case of a draw.
- Fights can be won by decision, knockout, or technical knockout.
- Fights are conducted with Kard Chuek rope wraps.
