= Muangfahlek Kiatwichian =

Thai kickboxer

Muangfahlek
- Born: Morakot Lawanna; September 14, 1971 (age 55); Maha Chana Chai district, Yasothon Province, Thailand
- Native name: มรกต ลาวรรณา
- Other names: Mr.Bang; Morakot Lukmuangfah (มรกต ลูกเมืองฟ้า)
- Height: 1.65 m (5 ft 5 in)
- Weight: 57 kg (126 lb; 9.0 st)
- Division: Bantamweight; Super Bantamweight; Featherweight; Super Featherweight; Lightweight
- Style: Muay Thai
- Stance: Orthodox
- Team: Chuwattana gym

Professional boxing record
- Total: 28
- Wins: 17
- By knockout: 11
- Losses: 11
- By knockout: 3

Other information
- Boxing record from BoxRec

Muangfahlek Kiatwichian (Thai: เมืองฟ้าเล็ก เกียรติวิเชียร) is a Thai former Muay Thai fighter, mixed martial artist and boxer.

== Biography and career ==
Muangfahlek started training in Muay Thai at 8 years old with his father who was a fighter himself, alongside his two older brothers. His family had been farming rice for generations. After school he would help out in the fields, and then train. Three years after the beginning of his training, he had his first fight. Him and his brothers would compete in festivals around their hometown of Yasothon in Isaan.

Muangfahlek would eventually leave for Bangkok when he was 15 years old. Around that time he was working at a tire factory with his brother and trained in a small camp on the outskirts of Bangkok. Slowly, he started to build a name and a year later moved to the Chuwattana gym. Muangfahlek competed during the 1990s also known as the Golden Age of Muay Thai. He defeated notable times of the era such as Singdam Or.Ukrit, Silapathai Jockygym or Anantasak Panyuthaphum. His record purse of 350,000 baht was received for a fight against two time Fighter of the Year Kaensak Sor.Ploenjit in 1995, which he won by decision. Despite being constantly highly ranked in Bangkok it took 10 years of competition for Muangfahlek to receive a title fight opportunity. He then became a two time Rajadamnern Stadium Featherweight champion and was elected Rajadamnern Stadium Fighter of the Year in 1997.

In 2003 as Muangfahlek was reaching the end of his career he faced Anuwat Kaewsamrit twice with the Rajadamnern Stadium Featherweight at stake. He would lose both fights.

After his Muay Thai career in the Bangkok stadiums, Muangfahlek turned to professional boxing where he would amass a record of 17 wins and 11 losses. He faced future champions such as OPBF champion Randy Suico and WBA world champion Takashi Uchiyama. Muangfahlek then lived in Japan for eleven years as a muay thai trainer. While in Japan he continued to occasionally compete both in muay thai and mixed martial art.

Muangfahlek's first fight in Japan happened on May 5, 2000, when he faced local champion Hiroki Ishii at the SNKA "The Title" event. The fight ended in a draw after five rounds. On July 11, 2004, Muangfahlek faced SNKA champion Hiroki Ishii for the third time at SNKA "Mangum 5". The fight was declared a draw for the second time.

Under mixed martial arts rules Muangfahlek faced Yoshiro Maeda at DEEP 22 on December 2, 2005. He lost the fight by first round technical knockout.

After coming back to Thailand Muangfahlek kept working as a muay thai trainer in various gyms. He also became an instructor for Evolve MMA in Singapore.

== Titles and accomplishments ==
- Rajadamnern Stadium
  - 2x Rajadamnern Stadium Featherweight (126 lbs) Champion
  - 1997 Rajadamnern Stadium Fighter of the Year

== Mixed martial arts record ==
Professional record breakdown
2 matches	1 win	1 loss
By knockout	1	1

Res.	Record	Opponent	Method	Event	Date	Round	Time	Location	Notes
Loss	1–1	Yoshiro Maeda	KO (punches)	Deep: 22 Impact	December 2, 2005	1	2:26	Tokyo, Japan	Deep Featherweight Tournament Semifinal.
Win	1-0	Atsuhiro Tsuboi	KO (soccer kick)	Deep: 21 Impact	October 28, 2005	2	1:32	Tokyo, Japan	Deep Featherweight Tournament Quarterfinal.

== Muay Thai record ==
Muay Thai record
Date	Result	Opponent	Event	Location	Method	Round	Time
2006-11-22	Loss	(Japan) Yukihiro Komiya	J-NETWORK MACH GO! GO! '06	Tokyo, Japan	Ext.R Decision (split)	4	3:00
2005-07-03	Loss	(Japan) Atom Yamada	MAJKF Shikoku Kessen vol.6	Matsuyama, Japan	Decision (unanimous)	5	3:00
For the WMAF World Featherweight title.
2005-02-03	Win	(Thailand) Changpa Lukprabat	Jarumuang, Rajadamnern Stadium	Bangkok, Thailand	KO (right hook)	1	
2004-08-08	Win	(Japan) Masaru	SNKA Hachiōji Kakumei Dai Issho	Tokyo, Japan	Decision (unanimous)	3	3:00
2004-07-11	Draw	(Japan) Hiroki Ishii	SNKA MAGNUM 5	Tokyo, Japan	Decision (majority)	3	3:00
2003-08-06	Loss	(Thailand) Anuwat Kaewsamrit	Daorungchujarean, Rajadamnern Stadium	Bangkok, Thailand	KO (right cross)	3	
For the Rajadamnern Stadium Featherweight (126 lbs) title.
2003-02-05	Loss	(Thailand) Anuwat Kaewsamrit	Daorungchujaroen, Rajadamnern Stadium	Bangkok, Thailand	Decision	5	3:00
For the Rajadamnern Stadium Featherweight (126 lbs) title.
2002-	Draw	(Thailand) Watcharachai Kaewsamrit	Rajadamnern Stadium	Bangkok, Thailand	Decision	5	3:00
2002-01-27	Win	(Japan) Hiroki Ishii	SNKA "Strike Back!"	Tokyo, Japan	TKO (cut)	2	1:01
2001	Loss	(Thailand) Attachai Fairtex	Rajadamnern Stadium	Bangkok, Thailand	Decision	5	3:00
2000-06-25	Win	(Japan) Shingo Garyu	SNKA	Ōtsuki, Yamanashi, Japan	KO	3	1:25
2000-05-05	Draw	(Japan) Hiroki Ishii	SNKA	Tokyo, Japan	Decision	5	3:00
2000-02-02	Loss	(Thailand) Watcharachai Kaewsamrit	Rajadamnern Stadium	Bangkok, Thailand	Decision	5	3:00
1999-12-22	Win	(Thailand) Komkiat Sor.Thanikul	Rajadamnern Stadium	Bangkok, Thailand	Decision	5	3:00
1999-11-12	Loss	(Thailand) Naronglek Mueangsriwichai	Chatchuchok, Lumpinee Stadium	Bangkok, Thailand	KO (high kick)	3	
1999-10-04	Loss	(Thailand) Chinnarat Chor. Watcharin	Daorung Chujaroen, Lumpinee Stadium	Bangkok, Thailand	Decision	5	3:00
1999-07-24	Draw	(Thailand) Kruekchai Kaewsamrit	SNKA	Tokyo, Japan	Decision	5	3:00
1999-	Loss	(Thailand) Donkings Kiatpayathai	Lumpinee Stadium	Bangkok, Thailand	Decision	5	3:00
1999-03-19	Win	(Thailand) Wanchalerm Tor.Patak	Chaomangkon, Lumpinee Stadium	Bangkok, Thailand	Decision	5	3:00
1999-01-10	Loss	(Thailand) Donkings Kiatpayathai	Omnoi Stadium	Samut Sakhon, Thailand	Decision	5	3:00
For the vacant Omnoi Stadium Featherweight (126 lbs) title.
1998-12-23	Win	(Thailand) Anantasak Panyuthaphum	Rajadamnern Stadium	Bangkok, Thailand	Decision	5	3:00
1998-	Loss	(Thailand) Anantasak Panyuthaphum	Rajadamnern Stadium	Bangkok, Thailand	Decision	5	3:00
1998-03-02	Loss	(Thailand) Attachai Fairtex	Rajadamnern Stadium	Bangkok, Thailand	Decision	5	3:00
1997-	Win	(Thailand) Singdam Or.Ukrit	Omnoi Stadium - Isuzu Cup	Samut Sakhon, Thailand	Decision	5	3:00
1997-04-09	Win	(Thailand) Namtaothong Sor.Sirikul	Daorungchujaroen, Rajadamnern Stadium	Bangkok, Thailand	Decision	5	3:00
1997-03-10	Win	(Thailand) Rolex Kaennorasing	Phettongkam, Rajadamnern Stadium	Bangkok, Thailand	Decision	5	3:00
1996-12-09	Loss	(Thailand) Wanwiset Kaennorasing	Daorungchujaroen, Rajadamnern Stadium	Bangkok, Thailand	Decision	5	3:00
1996-08-27	Loss	(Thailand) Saenklai Sit Kru Od	Petchyindee, Lumpinee Stadium	Bangkok, Thailand	Decision	5	3:00
1996-01-23	Draw	(Thailand) Changnoi Sirimongkol	Daorung TV7, Lumpinee Stadium	Bangkok, Thailand	Decision	5	3:00
1995-12-	Win	(Thailand) Rolex Kaennorasing	Rajadamnern Stadium	Bangkok, Thailand	KO	2	
1995-11-27	Loss	(Thailand) Choengnoen Sitphutthapim	Rajadamnern Stadium	Bangkok, Thailand	Decision	5	3:00
1995-10-23	Win	(Thailand) Silapathai Jockygym	Phettongkam, Rajadamnern Stadium	Bangkok, Thailand	Decision	5	3:00
1995-09-18	Win	(Thailand) Kaensak Sor.Ploenjit	Phetawanook + Sakmueangklaeng, Rajadamnern Stadium	Bangkok, Thailand	Decision	5	3:00
1995-08-29	Win	(Thailand) Watcharalek Wongwianyaiplaza	Chaomangkonngoenlan, Lumpinee Stadium	Bangkok, Thailand	Decision	5	3:00
1995-08-08	Win	(Thailand) Singdam Or.Ukrit	Petchyindee, Lumpinee Stadium	Bangkok, Thailand	Decision	5	3:00
1995-07-13	Loss	(Thailand) Saenklai Sit Kru Od	Daorungchujaroen, Rajadamnern Stadium	Bangkok, Thailand	Decision	5	3:00
1995-05-03	NC	(Thailand) Daraek Sitkrungsap	Daorungchujaroen, Rajadamnern Stadium	Bangkok, Thailand	Daraek dismissed	5	
1995-03-31	Win	(Thailand) Anantasak Panyuthaphum	Daorung TV7, Lumpinee Stadium	Bangkok, Thailand	Decision	5	3:00
1995-02-23	Loss	(Thailand) Anantasak Panyuthaphum	Lumpinee Stadium	Bangkok, Thailand	Decision	5	3:00
1995-01-25	Win	(Thailand) Singnoi Sor.Prasatphon	Daorungchujaroen, Rajadamnern Stadium	Bangkok, Thailand	Decision	5	3:00
1994-12-29	Draw	(Thailand) Singnoi Sor.Prasatphon		Bangkok, Thailand	Decision	5	3:00
1994-12-14	Win	(Thailand) Daonapa Kiatsamran		Bangkok, Thailand	Decision	5	3:00
1994-10-27	Loss	(Thailand) Namtaothong Sor.Sirikul	Daorungchujaroen, Rajadamnern Stadium	Bangkok, Thailand	Decision	5	3:00
1994-10-05	Win	(Thailand) Daonapa Kiatsamran		Bangkok, Thailand	Decision	5	3:00
1994-09-08	Win	(Thailand) Prayut Na Pinthon		Bangkok, Thailand	Decision	5	3:00
1994-07-28	Win	(Thailand) Sornram Sor.Udomsorn		Bangkok, Thailand	Decision	5	3:00
1994-07-07	Loss	(Thailand) Thapisut Sor.Maliwan	Rajadamnern Stadium	Bangkok, Thailand	Decision	5	3:00
1994-06-08	Loss	(Thailand) Chamuekpet Hapalang	Rajadamnern Stadium	Bangkok, Thailand	Decision	5	3:00
1994-05-04	Win	(Thailand) Singhanoi Sor.Prasatphon		Bangkok, Thailand	Decision	5	3:00
1994-04-01	Win	(Thailand) Kengkae Kiatkamthon	Chaomangkon, Lumpinee Stadium	Bangkok, Thailand	Decision	5	3:00
1994-02-24	Win	(Thailand) Chatpichit Menwood		Bangkok, Thailand	Decision	5	3:00
1994-01-15	Win	(Thailand) Saichon Pichitsuk	Omnoi Stadium	Samut Sakhon, Thailand	Decision	5	3:00
1993-12-30	Win	(Thailand) D-Day Wor.Khemsaksit		Bangkok, Thailand	Decision	5	3:00
1993-11-25	Win	(Thailand) Sangwalek Sor.Thotsapon	Daorungchujaroen, Rajadamnern Stadium	Bangkok, Thailand	KO (Punches)	4	
1993-11-12	Win	(Thailand) Thitima Kiatprasanchai		Bangkok, Thailand	Decision	5	3:00
1993-10-28	Win	(Thailand) Saennapa Fairtex	Rajadamnern Stadium	Bangkok, Thailand	Decision	5	3:00
1993-08-19	Loss	(Thailand) Namtaothong Sor.Sirikul		Bangkok, Thailand	Decision	5	3:00
1993-08-05	Win	(Thailand) Sornram Sor.Udomson	Rajadamnern Stadium	Bangkok, Thailand	Decision	5	3:00
1993-06-09	Win	(Thailand) Phachonjit Lukmatulee		Bangkok, Thailand	KO	4	
1993-04-29	Win	(Thailand) Rueangdet Kiatpakphanang		Bangkok, Thailand	KO	4	
1993-03-24	Loss	(Thailand) Kraikangwan Or.Sribualoi	Rajadamnern Stadium	Bangkok, Thailand	Decision	5	3:00
1993-03-02	Loss	(Thailand) Kraikangwan Or.Sribualoi		Bangkok, Thailand	Decision	5	3:00
1993-01-31	Loss	(Thailand) Thitima Kiatprasanchai		Bangkok, Thailand	Decision	5	3:00
1993-01-05	Loss	(Thailand) Kongfa Luktabfah		Bangkok, Thailand	Decision	5	3:00
1992-12-16	Win	(Thailand) Kaimuktae Sit Kuanyim	Rajadamnern Stadium	Bangkok, Thailand	KO (Right cross)	1	0:32
1992-08-20	Win	(Thailand) Saennapa Fairtex	Rajadamnern Stadium	Bangkok, Thailand	Decision	5	3:00
1992-	Win	(Thailand) Nuathoranee Chor.Rojanachai		Bangkok, Thailand	Decision	5	3:00
1992-	Win	(Thailand) Santos Saengmorakot		Bangkok, Thailand	Decision	5	3:00
1991-06-24	Win	(Thailand) Nerannid Sitneran	Daorungchujaroen, Rajadamnern Stadium	Bangkok, Thailand	Decision	5	3:00
1991-04-04	Loss	(Thailand) Charoenchai Sitjomthong	Daorungchujaroen, Rajadamnern Stadium	Bangkok, Thailand	Decision	5	3:00
1991-03-21		(Thailand) Wanwiset Kaennorasing	Daorungchujaroen, Rajadamnern Stadium	Bangkok, Thailand			
1991-01-30	Win	(Thailand) Phetnakon Damrongchai	Rajadamnern Stadium	Bangkok, Thailand	Decision	5	3:00
1991-01-17	Loss	(Thailand) Suwitlek Lukbangplasoi	Royal Thai Army Stadium	Thailand	Decision	5	3:00
1990-11-15	NC	(Thailand) Noomtrang Kiatkaosaen	Rajadamnern Stadium	Bangkok, Thailand	Noomtrang dismissed	3	
1990-	Win	(Thailand) Charoenchai Sitjomthong	Rajadamnern Stadium	Bangkok, Thailand	Decision	5	3:00
1990-05-31	Loss	(Thailand) Kongthorani Premchai	Daorungchujaroen, Rajadamnern Stadium	Bangkok, Thailand	Decision	5	3:00
Legend: Win Loss Draw/No contest Notes
