= Dennuea Denmolee =

Thai professional Muay Thai fighter (1965-2022)

- Born: Den Wanduang; September 17, 1965; Mae Tha, Lamphun, Thailand
- Died: January 28, 2022 (aged 56); Bangkok, Thailand; Colon cancer
- Native name: เด่น วรรณด้วง
- Other names: Dennuea Pitsanurachan (เด่นเหนือ พิษณุราชันย์)
- Nickname: The Top Boxer of Lanna (ยอดมวยแห่งล้านนา)
- Height: 164 cm (5 ft 5 in)
- Division: Mini Flyweight; Light Flyweight; Flyweight
- Style: Muay Thai (Muay Femur)
- Stance: Southpaw
- Team: Sor.Tassanee Gym; Pitsanurachan Gym

Den Wanduang (Thai: เด่น วรรณด้วง; born September 17, 1965), known professionally as Dennuea Denmolee (Thai: เด่นเหนือ เด่นโมฬี), was a Thai professional Muay Thai fighter. He was a one-time Lumpinee Stadium champion and two-time Rajadamnern Stadium champion across three divisions who was famous during the 1980s.

== Biography and career ==
Den Wanduang was born on September 17, 1965, in the Lamphun province. He moved to Bangkok at the age of 15 to find work and ended up joining the Pitsanurachan boxing camp. There he started to compete at 16 under the ring name Dennuea Pitasanurachan.

Dennuea became a three weight champion in the major Bangkok stadiums.

Dennuea died on January 28, 2022, in Bangkok at the age of 56 from colon cancer.

== Titles and accomplishments ==
- Lumpinee Stadium
  - 1984 Lumpinee Stadium (105 lbs) Champion
    - One successful title defense
- Rajadamnern Stadium
  - 1989 Rajadamnern Stadium Flyweight (112 lbs) Champion
  - 1990 Rajadamnern Stadium Super Flyweight (115 lbs) Champion
    - One successful title defense

== Professional boxing record ==
1 fight	1 win	0 losses
By decision	1	0

No.	Result	Record	Opponent	Type	Round	Date	Location	Notes
1	Win	1-0	Thanonnoi Itsaraphap	PTS	4	January 24, 1982	Bangkok, Thailand	

== Muay Thai record ==
Muay Thai record
Date	Result	Opponent	Event	Location	Method	Round	Time
1991-12-19	Loss	(Thailand) Lakhin Wassandasit	Rajadamnern Stadium, Isuzu Cup	Bangkok, Thailand	KO	2	
Loses the Rajadamnern Stadium Super Flyweight (115 lbs) title.
1991-10-03	Loss	(Thailand) Burklerk Pinsinchai	Rajadamnern Stadium – Isuzu Cup	Thailand	Decision	5	3:00
1991-08-29	Draw	(Thailand) Dejrit Sor.Ploenchit	Rajadamnern Stadium - Isuzu Cup	Bangkok, Thailand	Decision	5	3:00
1991-06-26		(Thailand) Singnoi Sor.Prasatporn	Rajadamnern Stadium	Bangkok, Thailand			
1991-05-08	Loss	(Thailand) Veeraphol Sahaprom	Rajadamnern Stadium	Bangkok, Thailand	KO (Right Cross)	3	
1991-01-30	Win	(Thailand) Daonapa Kiatsamran	Rajadamnern Stadium	Bangkok, Thailand	Decision	5	3:00
Defends the Rajadamnern Stadium Super Flyweight (115 lbs) title.
1990-11-29	Win	(Thailand) Daonapa Kiatsamran		Bangkok, Thailand	Decision	5	3:00
1990-06-30	Loss	(Thailand) Samernoi Tor.Boonlert		Chiang Mai, Thailand	KO	4	
1990-06-15	Win	(Thailand) Kongfah Luktabfah	Rajadamnern Stadium	Bangkok, Thailand	Decision	5	3:00
1990-05-09	Win	(Thailand) Kongfah Luktabfah	Rajadamnern Stadium	Bangkok, Thailand	Decision	5	3:00
Wins the vacant Rajadamnern Stadium Super Flyweight (115 lbs) title.
1990-03-29	Win	(Thailand) Mawin Luktrachawit		Bangkok, Thailand	Decision	5	3:00
1990-02-20	Win	(Thailand) Darathong Kiatmuangtrang	Lumpinee Stadium	Bangkok, Thailand	Decision	5	3:00
1990-01-30	Draw	(Thailand) Darathong Kiatmuangtrang	Lumpinee Stadium	Bangkok, Thailand	Decision	5	3:00
1989-12-29	Loss	(Thailand) Pimaranlek SitAran	Lumpinee Stadium	Bangkok, Thailand	Decision	5	3:00
1989-10-18	Win	(Thailand) Supernoi Sor.Kettalingchan	Rajadamnern Stadium	Bangkok, Thailand	Decision	5	3:00
1989-09-25	Loss	(Thailand) Rajasak Sor.Vorapin	Rajadamnern Stadium	Bangkok, Thailand	Decision	5	3:00
1989-08-08	Win	(Thailand) Toiting Kiatphetnoi	Lumpinee Stadium	Bangkok, Thailand	Decision	5	3:00
1989-07-09	Win	(Thailand) Pitilek Chaipiphat	Rajadamnern Stadium	Bangkok, Thailand	Decision	5	3:00
1989-06-05	Loss	(Thailand) Kaensak Sor.Ploenjit	Rajadamnern Stadium	Bangkok, Thailand	Decision	5	3:00
Loses the Rajadamnern Stadium Flyweight (112 lbs) title.
1989-04-24	Win	(Thailand) Klaisuwit Sunkilanongkee	Rajadamnern Stadium	Bangkok, Thailand	KO	4	
1989-02-22	Win	(Thailand) Samernoi Tor.Boonlert	Rajadamnern Stadium	Bangkok, Thailand	KO	4	
1989-01-15	Win	(Thailand) Veeraphol Sahaprom	Crocodile Farm	Samut Prakan, Thailand	Decision	5	3:00
Wins the Rajadamnern Stadium Flyweight (112 lbs) title.
1988-10-19	Loss	(Thailand) Boonam Sor.Jarunee	Rajadamnern Stadium	Bangkok, Thailand	Decision	5	3:00
1988-09-12	Win	(Thailand) Detduang Por.Pongsawang		Bangkok, Thailand	Decision	5	3:00
1988-08-22	Loss	(Thailand) Boonam Sor.Jarunee	Rajadamnern Stadium	Bangkok, Thailand	Decision	5	3:00
1988-06-29	Win	(Thailand) Samernoi Tor.Boonlert	Rajadamnern Stadium	Bangkok, Thailand	Decision	5	3:00
1988-05-09	Win	(Thailand) Toiting Kiatphetnoi	Huamark Stadium	Bangkok, Thailand	Decision	5	3:00
1988-03-15	Win	(Thailand) Morakot Chor.Waikul	Onesongchai, Lumpinee Stadium	Bangkok, Thailand	Decision	5	3:00
1988-02-13	Win	(Thailand) Sukkasem Dechchawalit	Sea Kim Yong Stadium	Hat Yai, Thailand	Decision	5	3:00
1988-02-02	Win	(Thailand) Ritthichai Lookchaomaesaitong	Lumpinee Stadium	Bangkok, Thailand	Decision	5	3:00
1987-11-25	Loss	(Thailand) Sakchai Wongwianyai	Rajadamnern Stadium	Bangkok, Thailand	Decision	5	3:00
1987-10-02	Loss	(Thailand) Pungluang Kiatianan	Lumpinee Stadium	Bangkok, Thailand	Decision	5	3:00
1987-08-28	Loss	(Thailand) Jaroenthong Kiatbanchong		Bangkok, Thailand	Decision	5	3:00
1987-06-25	Win	(Thailand) Kwanjai Petchyindee		Bangkok, Thailand	Decision	5	3:00
1987-05-19	Loss	(Thailand) Langsuan Panyuthaphum	Lumpinee Stadium	Bangkok, Thailand	Decision	5	3:00
For the vacant Lumpinee Stadium Light Flyweight (108 lbs) title.
1987-03-24	Win	(Thailand) Seesot Sor.Ritthichai		Bangkok, Thailand	Decision	5	3:00
1987-02-06	Loss	(Thailand) Paruhatlek Sitchunthong	Lumpinee Stadium	Bangkok, Thailand	KO (Punches)	1	
1987-01-13	Win	(Thailand) Wangchannoi Sor.Sirada	Lumpinee Stadium	Bangkok, Thailand	Referee stop.	5	
1986-12-10	Draw	(Thailand) Odnoi Lukprabat		Bangkok, Thailand	Decision	5	3:00
1986-11-25	Win	(Thailand) Odnoi Lukprabat		Bangkok, Thailand	Decision	5	3:00
1986-10-14	Loss	(Thailand) Wangchannoi Sor.Sirada	Lumpinee Stadium	Bangkok, Thailand	KO	4	
1986-08-22	Loss	(Thailand) Paruhatlek Sitchunthong	Lumpinee Stadium	Bangkok, Thailand	Decision	5	3:00
1986-07-29	Win	(Thailand) Suasaming Sitchang		Bangkok, Thailand	KO	2	
1986-06-27	Win	(Thailand) Ruengsaknoi Por.Ped		Thailand	Referee stop.	5	
1986-06-03	Win	(Thailand) Detduang Por.Pongsawang	Lumpinee Stadium	Bangkok, Thailand	Decision	5	3:00
1986-04-08	Win	(Thailand) Supernoi Sitchokchai		Bangkok, Thailand	Decision	5	3:00
1986-03-04	Win	(Thailand) Sittichai Monsongkram	Lumpinee Stadium	Bangkok, Thailand	Decision	5	3:00
1986-01-18	Loss	(Thailand) Jockynoi Na Nongkhae	Huamark Stadium	Bangkok, Thailand	KO	3	
1985-12-06	Win	(Thailand) Jockynoi Na Nongkhae		Bangkok, Thailand	KO	3	
1985-11-05	Win	(Thailand) Yodmanut Sityodtong	Lumpinee Stadium	Bangkok, Thailand	Decision	5	3:00
1985-09-20	Loss	(Thailand) Paruhatlek Sitchunthong	Lumpinee Stadium	Bangkok, Thailand	Decision	5	3:00
1985-08-31	Win	(Thailand) Daotrang Tor.Boonlert	Sea Kim Yong Stadium	Hat Yai, Thailand	Decision	5	3:00
1985-06-22	Win	(Thailand) Wangchannoi Sor.Sirada	National Stadium	Bangkok, Thailand	Decision	5	3:00
Defends the Lumpinee Stadium (105 lbs) title.
1985-05-10	Loss	(Thailand) Odnoi Lukprabat	Lumpinee Stadium	Bangkok, Thailand	Decision	5	3:00
1985-04-05	Loss	(Thailand) Chokchaichew Na Pattaya		Chiang Mai, Thailand	Decision	5	3:00
1985-02-26	Loss	(Thailand) Panthong Phittakthangluang	Lumpinee Stadium	Bangkok, Thailand	Decision	5	3:00
1985-01-25	Win	(Thailand) Paruhatlek Sitchunthong	Dechanukroh Stadium	Chiang Mai, Thailand	Decision	5	3:00
1984-12-18	Draw	(Thailand) Jakraphetnoi Sor.Ploenchit		Bangkok, Thailand	Decision	5	3:00
1984-11-30	Loss	(Thailand) Paruhatlek Sitchunthong	Lumpinee Stadium	Bangkok, Thailand	Decision	5	3:00
1984-10-08	Win	(Thailand) Burklerk Pinsinchai	Huamark Stadium	Bangkok, Thailand	Decision	5	3:00
1984-08-31	Win	(Thailand) Danthai Kiattisuriya		Bangkok, Thailand	Referee stop.	5	
1984-07-31	Win	(Thailand) Boonkerd Fairtex	Lumpinee Stadium	Bangkok, Thailand	Decision	5	3:00
1984-06-29	Win	(Thailand) Sittichai Monsongkram	Lumpinee Stadium	Bangkok, Thailand	Decision	5	3:00
Wins the Lumpinee Stadium (105 lbs) title.
1984-05-25	Win	(Thailand) Sittichok Monsongkram	Lumpinee Stadium	Bangkok, Thailand	Decision	5	3:00
1984-04-24	Win	(Thailand) Mahawet Kiattisakthewan		Bangkok, Thailand	Referee stop.	4	
1984-03-30	Win	(Thailand) Panomtuanlek Hapalang	Lumpinee Stadium	Bangkok, Thailand	Decision	5	3:00
1984-03-09	Win	(Thailand) Rosedet Detdonchimpli		Bangkok, Thailand	Decision	5	3:00
1984-01-30	Loss	(Thailand) Sittichai Monsongkhram	Rajadamnern Stadium	Bangkok, Thailand	Decision	5	3:00
1983-12-	Loss	(Thailand) Wannarong Sor.Kiattisak		Saraburi, Thailand	Decision	5	3:00
1983-12-09	Win	(Thailand) Luksing Premchai		Ubon, Thailand	Decision	5	3:00
1983-11-19	Win	(Thailand) Leklai Sitsathasatha		Thailand	Decision	5	3:00
1983-10-29	Win	(Thailand) Rungarun Luatklongmadua		Thailand	Referee stop.	5	
1983-10-	Win	(Thailand) Songchainoi Por.Somchit Air		Chiang Mai, Thailand	Decision	5	3:00
1983-09-12	Win	(Thailand) Pungluang Sit Sor.Por.		Thailand	Decision	5	3:00
1983-08-13	Win	(Thailand) Samran Lukrangsi		Thailand	Decision	5	3:00
1983-07-09	Win	(Thailand) Sakchai Sor.Phetthae		Thailand	KO	3	
1983-06-	Win	(Thailand) Saengchai Lionman		Hat Yai, Thailand	Decision	5	3:00
1983-06-04	Loss	(Thailand) Thuanthong Lukdecha		Thailand	Decision	5	3:00
1983-05-07	Loss	(Thailand) Parinya Sitmahamad		Thailand	referee stop	5	
1983-04-09	Loss	(Thailand) Thuanthong Lukdecha		Thailand	Decision	5	3:00
1983-03-08	Loss	(Thailand) Fahsai Fairtex		Thailand	Decision	5	3:00
1983-02-	Win	(Thailand) Morakot Saknarin		Bangkok, Thailand	Decision	5	3:00
1983-01-	Loss	(Thailand) Pungluang Sit Sor.Por.		Lopburi, Thailand	Decision	5	3:00
1983-01-06	Win	(Thailand) Lakchai Sor.Sumalee		Thailand	Decision	5	3:00
1982-12-05	Draw	(Thailand) Saknaronglek Kiatkamchai	Channel 7 Stadium	Bangkok, Thailand	Decision	5	3:00
1982-11-06	Win	(Thailand) Narongsuk Sitpraphrom		Thailand	Decision	5	3:00
1982-09-02	Loss	(Thailand) Namchai Sitmanathep		Thailand	Decision	5	3:00
1982-08-05	Win	(Thailand) Wiset Sitsathaphan		Thailand	Decision	5	3:00
1982-07-	Win	(Thailand) Wichainoi Sitsin		Chaopraya, Thailand	Decision	5	3:00
1982-06-23	Win	(Thailand) Daoprakai Sitmanathep		Bangkok, Thailand	Decision	5	3:00
1982-05-23	Win	(Thailand) Rattana Thamrungruang		Thailand	KO	3	
1982-03-08	Loss	(Thailand) Wanchat Sitmanathep		Thailand	Decision	5	3:00
Legend: Win Loss Draw/No contest Notes
