= Singdam Or.Ukrit =

Thai former professional Muay Thai fighter

- Born: Somboon Yangsapyot; November 11, 1974 (age 51); Rayong Province, Thailand
- Native name: สิงห์ดำ อ.อุกฤษณ์
- Other names: Samingnoom Leutawan-Ok
- Nickname: World-Ending Left Kicker (แข้งซ้ายทลายโลก)
- Height: 172 cm (5 ft 8 in)
- Division: Flyweight; Super Featherweight; Bantamweight; Super Bantamweight; Featherweight
- Style: Muay Thai (Muay Tae / Muay Bouk)
- Stance: Southpaw
- Team: Prainanan/Lukbangplasoi
- Trainer: Wichit "Pi Witoon" Praianan

Other information
- Occupation: Muay Thai fighter (retired); Muay Thai trainer (formerly); Hired hand & gardener

Jongsomboon Yangsapyot (Thai: สมบูรณ์ ยังทรัพย์ยอด; born Somboon Yangsapyot; November 11, 1974), known professionally as Singdam Or.Ukrit (Thai: สิงห์ดำ อ.อุกฤษณ์) is a Thai former professional Muay Thai fighter. He was heralded as the greatest fighter in the bantamweight (118 lbs) division of the golden era of Muay Thai owing to his aggressive southpaw Muay Tae style (kicking style). His highly successful kicking ability resulted in the nickname of the "World-Ending Left Kicker" by the Thai media during his prime.

There are multiple ways to anglicize Singdam's name such as Singhdam Or. Aukritt, Singhadam Aor.Aukrit, Singdam O.Ukritt, etc.

== Biography and career ==
=== Early life and beginning of Muay Thai career ===
Jongsomboon Yangsapyot was born as Somboon Yangsapyot in Rayong province as the 6th child in a family of 10. He started his Muay Thai training at the age of 9 under Kru Chan Fungfueng in the Leutawan-ok gym. He fought around 20 times in his neighborhood under the ring name of "Samingnoom Leutawan-ok" until he became well known in the area. His success caught the attention of former yodmuay Wichit Praianan who was also the #1 Muay Thai trainer in eastern Thailand at the time. Praianan brought him to the popular Praianan/Lukbangplasoi camp co-owned by Ukrit Tansavad with the goal of honing his ability until he became a yodmuay (elite fighter) himself. Under the new ring name of "Singdam Or.Ukrit," he would make his Bangkok debut by defeating the KO artist Yokthai Sit.Or who is the camp senior of the highly skilled Nong-O Gaiyanghadao and Petchtanong Petchfergus. He would later change his legal name to Jongsomboon Yangsapyot.

Singdam was later qualified to begin fighting at the prestigious Lumpinee Stadium and won 17 fights in a row, defeating other up-and-coming fighters such as "The Teep-to-the-Face Man" Rotnarong Daopadriew and Takrawlek Dejrath.

=== Elite career in Bangkok ===
In 1992 Singdam was matched up against one of the most significant Muay Femur fighters of the Muay Thai golden era Saenklai Sit Kru Od, drawing against him and then defeating him in the rematch. In the same year he would beat Yodkhunpon Sittraiphum and Duangsompong Por.Pongsawang, 2 fighters who were renowned for their high durability and powerful striking.

Singdam fought his way through the top fighters under 120 lbs with his powerful, fast, and consistent left kick which earned him the nickname of "The World-Ending Left Kicker" by the Thai media. His kicking style meant that Singdam was a Muay Tae fighter (fighter who primarily kicks). Singdam's style is unusual since most Muay Tae fighters are rope-a-dope Muay Femur fighters but Singdam preferred to be an aggressive pressure fighter. His second signature technique was his left punch which was combined well with his southpaw kicking style, giving him another way to pressure forward as well as to set up his left kick.

1993 was the peak of Singdam's career, during this time he would be up against the fighters who resided at the ceiling of the bantamweight division (118 lbs). Veeraphol Sahaprom, Samson Isaan, Silapathai Jockygym, and especially "The Two-Time Fighter of the Year" Kaensak Sor.Ploenjit all lost to him in within the year. In Singdam's matchup against Kaensak, he was knocked down by a right hook and then less than 20 seconds later he knocked down Kaensak with a left hook and landed a right hook as he fell. Although Kaensak was also doing well for the rest of the fight, Singdam would outscore the highly respected fighter with his left kick as well as with various techniques to try to nullify and counter Kaensak's explosive Muay Femur style. Singdam won the bout and both fighters earned the 1993 Fight of the Year award. His victory against Kaensak was the fight that he was most proud of; in addition Singdam was paid 250,000 baht which was the highest purse of his career. In comparison, the usual purse of elite fighters was 100,000 baht and it was rare for one to receive a purse of 200,000 baht and above.

From 1991 to 1996, Singdam was considered to be the greatest bantamweight fighter in the Kingdom of Thailand even if he was not able to secure a title. Singdam was famed for his rivalries against Saenklai Sit Kru Od and Anantasak Panythaphum. Singdam was qualified to compete for the bantamweight championship twice against Saenklai but was denied both times even if Singdam would win by a large margin against him in their other fights. In 1994, Singdam was winning by a large margin against Dara-ek Sitkrungsap but the referee announced Dara-ek as the winner. The audiences rioted, going so far as to climb the metal fence that separated the VIP area from the rest of the stadium. Singdam's corner as well as military officers climbed into the ring. Instead of giving the win to Singdam, the officials declared the fight a no contest. Singdam would still continue beating yodmuay afterward, defeating the technical Jaowehar Looktabfah multiple times as well as Manopchai Singmanasak.

=== Retirement and later years ===
Later on in his career, Singdam had to move up to junior featherweight (122 lbs), then eventually to featherweight (126 lbs), and his performance as a Muay Thai fighter began declining. Singdam is considered an unlucky yodmuay in Thailand as every time he fought for a title, he would be denied by his opponent despite being highly successful in his other matchups. After losing to underdog Anantachai Monsongkhram in 2003, Singdam retired from Muay Thai, reasoning that he grew disinterested with weight cutting. Singdam's victories against Kaensak Sor.Ploenjit and Veeraphol Sahaprom were considered his best fights. He was matched up against another powerful southpaw kicker, Padejsuek Kiatsamran, but they did not fight. Singdam cites the Muay Maat fighter Chatchainoi Chaorai-Oi as the opponent who hurt him the most in a fight.

After his fighting career, Singdam married a woman from Chonburi and now has 2 daughters. He went to Japan to work as a Muay Thai trainer before returning to Thailand to become a municipal employee and opened a seafood stand on a market. As of 2022, he is working as a hired hand and gardener.

== Titles and accomplishments ==
- Omnoi Stadium
  - 1997 7th Isuzu Cup Tournament runner-up

Awards

- 1993 Sports Writers Association of Thailand Fight of the Year (vs Kaensak Sor.Ploenjit on July 13, 1993)

== Muay Thai record ==
Muay Thai record
Date	Result	Opponent	Event	Location	Method	Round	Time
2003-08-07	Loss	(Thailand) Anantachai Monsongkhram	Rajadamnern Stadium	Bangkok, Thailand	Decision	5	3:00
2003-04-12	Win	(Thailand) Sibmuen Laemthong	Omnoi Stadium	Samut Sakhon, Thailand	Decision	5	3:00
2003-02-22	Win	(Thailand) Sibmuen Laemthong	Omnoi Stadium	Samut Sakhon, Thailand	Decision	5	3:00
2002-09-22	Loss	(Thailand) Eaksit Sitkriengkrai	Channel 7 Stadium	Bangkok, Thailand	Decision	5	3:00
2002-08-10	Loss	(Thailand) Dokmaifai Tor.Sitthichai	Omnoi Stadium	Samut Sakhon, Thailand	Decision	5	3:00
2002-03-19	Win	(Thailand) Sinchainoi Sor.Kittichai	Lumpinee Stadium	Bangkok, Thailand	Decision	5	3:00
2002-02-22	Win	(Thailand) Sila Tor.Bangsaen	Lumpinee Stadium	Bangkok, Thailand	Decision	5	3:00
2001-12-28	Loss	(Thailand) Phetarun Sor.Suwanpakdee	Lumpinee Stadium	Bangkok, Thailand	Decision	5	3:00
2001-12-08	Win	(Thailand) Sila Tor.Bangsaen	Omnoi Stadium	Samut Sakhon, Thailand	Decision	5	3:00
2001-08-17	Loss	(Thailand) Thananchai Nakornthong	Lumpinee Stadium	Bangkok, Thailand	Decision	5	3:00
2001-03-09	Draw	(Thailand) Sinchainoi Sor.Kittichai	Lumpinee Stadium	Bangkok, Thailand	Decision	5	3:00
2001-02-13	Win	(Thailand) Chatri Sit Hengjia	Lumpinee Stadium	Bangkok, Thailand	Decision	5	3:00
2001-01-27	Loss	(Thailand) Chatri Sit Hengjia	Lumpinee Stadium	Bangkok, Thailand	Decision	5	3:00
2000-12-31	Win	(Thailand) Panpayak Thammakasem	Ladprao Stadium	Bangkok, Thailand	Decision	5	3:00
2000-09-09	Win	(Thailand) Hatyai Kiatchaiyong	Omnoi Stadium	Samut Sakhon, Thailand	Decision	5	3:00
2000-07-15	Loss	(Thailand) Songkhla Kiatchaiyong	Omnoi Stadium	Samut Sakhon, Thailand	Decision	5	3:00
1999-01-02	Loss	(Thailand) Phet-Ek Sor.Suwanpakdee	Omnoi Stadium	Bangkok, Thailand	Decision	5	3:00
For the Omnoi Stadium Featherweight (126 lbs) title.
1998-10-	Loss	(Thailand) Phet-Ek Sor.Suwanpakdee	Rajadamnern Stadium	Bangkok, Thailand	Decision	5	3:00
1998-07-11	Win	(Thailand) Dokmaifai Tor.Sitthichai	Omnoi Stadium	Samut Sakhon, Thailand	TKO (Doctor Stoppage)	1	
1998-04-21	Win	(Thailand) Tor.Patak Wanchalerm	Lumpinee Stadium	Bangkok, Thailand	Decision	5	3:00
1998-02-06	Win	(Thailand) Atsawin Kiatmontep	Lumpinee Stadium	Bangkok, Thailand	Decision	5	3:00
1997-11-14	Win	(Thailand) Itthidet Sor.Sukhontip	Lumpinee Stadium	Bangkok, Thailand	Decision	5	3:00
1997-10-07	Loss	(Thailand) Itthidet Sor.Sukhontip	Lumpinee Stadium	Bangkok, Thailand	KO		
1997-08-26	Win	(Thailand) Dokmaipa Por Pongsawang	Lumpinee Stadium	Bangkok, Thailand	Decision	5	3:00
1997-04-26	Loss	(Thailand) Anantasak Panyuthaphum	Omnoi Stadium - Isuzu Cup Final	Samut Sakhon, Thailand	Decision	5	3:00
For the Isuzu Cup and the Omnoi Stadium Featherweight (126 lbs) title.
1997-02-22	Win	(Thailand) Chutin Por.Tawachai	Omnoi Stadium - Isuzu Cup Semi Final	Samut Sakhon, Thailand	Decision	5	3:00
1997-	Loss	(Thailand) Muangfahlek Kiatwichian	Omnoi Stadium - Isuzu Cup	Samut Sakhon, Thailand	Decision	5	3:00
1996-12-	Win	(Thailand) Saenklai Sit Kru Od	Omnoi Stadium - Isuzu Cup	Samut Sakhon, Thailand	Decision	5	3:00
1996-11	Win	(Thailand) Changnoi Sirimongkol	Omnoi Stadium	Samut Sakhon, Thailand	Decision	5	3:00
1996-10-	Win	(Thailand) Namtaothong Sor.Sirikul	Omnoi Stadium	Samut Sakhon, Thailand	Decision	5	3:00
1996-09-	Win	(Thailand) Yuthahat Sor.Narongchai	Omnoi Stadium	Samut Sakhon, Thailand	Decision	5	3:00
1996-	Draw	(Thailand) Dawsing Tor.Phitakonlakarn	Rajadamnern Stadium	Bangkok, Thailand	Decision	5	3:00
1996-	Win	(Thailand) Jaowehar Looktabfah	Lumpinee Stadium	Bangkok, Thailand	Decision	5	3:00
1996-04-27	Win	(Thailand) Jaowehar Looktabfah	Omnoi Stadium	Samut Sakhon, Thailand	Decision	5	3:00
1996-03-12	Loss	(Thailand) Manopchai Singmanasak	Lumpinee Stadium	Bangkok, Thailand	Decision	5	3:00
1996-	Loss	(Thailand) Manopchai Singmanasak	Lumpinee Stadium	Bangkok, Thailand	Decision	5	3:00
1996-	Win	(Thailand) Dengsuriya M-16	Omnoi Stadium	Samut Sakhon, Thailand	Decision	5	3:00
1995-12-14	Win	(Thailand) Jaowehar Looktabfah	Lumpinee Stadium	Bangkok, Thailand	Decision	5	3:00
1995-11-24	Loss	(Thailand) Manopchai Singmanasak	Lumpinee Stadium	Bangkok, Thailand	Decision	5	3:00
1995-10-20	Win	(Thailand) Manopchai Singmanasak	Lumpinee Stadium	Bangkok, Thailand	Decision	5	3:00
1995-08-08	Loss	(Thailand) Muangfahlek Kiatwichian	Lumpinee Stadium	Bangkok, Thailand	Decision	5	3:00
1995-07-14	Win	(Thailand) Jaowehar Looktabfah	Lumpinee Stadium	Bangkok, Thailand	Decision	5	3:00
1995-05-16	Draw	(Thailand) Jaowehar Looktabfah	Lumpinee Stadium	Bangkok, Thailand	Decision	5	3:00
1995-02-17	Loss	(Thailand) Manopchai Singmanasak	Lumpinee Stadium	Bangkok, Thailand	Decision	5	3:00
1995-01-24	Loss	(Thailand) Changnoi Sirimongkol	Lumpinee Stadium	Bangkok, Thailand	Decision	5	3:00
?	Win	(Netherlands) Michael Klopp		Amsterdam, Netherlands	TKO (Doctor Stoppage)	3	
1994-10-21	Loss	(Thailand) Daraek Sitrungsap	Lumpinee Stadium	Bangkok, Thailand	Decision	5	3:00
1994-09-30	NC	(Thailand) Daraek Sitrungsap	Lumpinee Stadium	Bangkok, Thailand	Decision	5	3:00
Originally a win for Daraek but it was overturned due to heavy gambler protest after the fight. Singdam was up in odds by 30/1 at the end of the fight.
1994-08-05	Loss	(Thailand) Saenklai Sit Kru Od	Lumpinee Stadium	Bangkok, Thailand	Decision (Unanimous)	5	3:00
For the Lumpinee Stadium Bantamweight (118 lbs) title.
1994-05-17	Win	(Thailand) Dokmaipa Por Pongsawang	Lumpinee Stadium	Bangkok, Thailand	Decision	5	3:00
1994-03-29	Loss	(Thailand) Saenklai Sit Kru Od	Lumpinee Stadium	Bangkok, Thailand	TKO (Right cross)	4	
For the Lumpinee Stadium Bantamweight (118 lbs) title.
1994-02-18	Win	(Thailand) Saenklai Sit Kru Od	Lumpinee Stadium	Bangkok, Thailand	Decision	5	3:00
1994-01-08	Win	(Thailand) Saenklai Sit Kru Od	Lumpinee Stadium	Bangkok, Thailand	Decision	5	3:00
1993-10-15	Loss	(Thailand) Anantasak Panyuthaphum	Lumpinee Stadium	Bangkok, Thailand	TKO (Doctor stoppage)	3	3:00
1993-09-14	Loss	(Thailand) Anantasak Panyuthaphum	Lumpinee Stadium	Bangkok, Thailand	TKO (Doctor Stoppage)	4	
1993-07-13	Win	(Thailand) Kaensak Sor.Ploenjit	Lumpinee Stadium	Bangkok, Thailand	Decision	5	3:00
1993-05-28	Win	(Thailand) Veeraphol Sahaprom	Lumpinee Stadium	Bangkok, Thailand	Decision	5	3:00
1993-04-02	Win	(Thailand) Samson Isaan	Lumpinee Stadium	Bangkok, Thailand	Decision	5	3:00
1993-02-15	Win	(Thailand) Silapathai Jockygym	Rajadamnern Stadium	Bangkok, Thailand	Decision	5	3:00
1992-12-25	Win	(Thailand) Yodkhunpon Sittraiphum	Lumpinee Stadium	Bangkok, Thailand	Decision	5	3:00
1992-09-11	Win	(Thailand) Duangsompong Por.Pongsawang	Lumpinee Stadium	Bangkok, Thailand	Decision	5	3:00
1992-05-17	Loss	(Thailand) Chartchainoi Chaorai-Oi	Lumpinee Stadium	Bangkok, Thailand	Decision	5	3:00
1992-03-06	Win	(Thailand) Saenklai Sit Kru Od	Lumpinee Stadium	Bangkok, Thailand	Decision	5	3:00
1992-02-14	Draw	(Thailand) Saenklai Sit Kru Od	Lumpinee Stadium	Bangkok, Thailand	Decision	5	3:00
1991-12-31	Draw	(Thailand) Dentaksin Sor Suwanpakdee	Lumpinee Stadium	Bangkok, Thailand	Decision	5	3:00
1991-11-12	Loss	(Thailand) Rittidet Sor Ploenjit	Lumpinee Stadium	Bangkok, Thailand	Decision	5	3:00
1991-07-19	Win	(Thailand) Niranoi Lukmoo2	Lumpinee Stadium	Bangkok, Thailand	Decision	5	3:00
1991-06-11	Win	(Thailand) Takrawlek Dejrath	Lumpinee Stadium	Bangkok, Thailand	Decision	5	3:00
1991-05-03	Win	(Thailand) Chalong Silapakorn	Lumpinee Stadium	Bangkok, Thailand	Decision	5	3:00
1991-01-22	Win	(Thailand) Rotnarong Daopadriew	Lumpinee Stadium	Bangkok, Thailand	Decision	5	3:00
1990-11-13	Win	(Thailand) Rotnarong Daopadriew	Lumpinee Stadium	Bangkok, Thailand	Decision	5	3:00
1990-10-26	Win	(Thailand) Dewanlek Sakthewan	Lumpinee Stadium	Bangkok, Thailand	Decision	5	3:00
1990-09-14	Win	(Thailand) Sakchai Kiatphayathai	Lumpinee Stadium	Bangkok, Thailand	Decision	5	3:00
1990-06-15	Win	(Thailand) Denpatapee Sitkhun	Lumpinee Stadium	Bangkok, Thailand	Decision	5	3:00
Legend: Win Loss Draw/No contest Notes
