= Silapathai Jockygym =

Thai Muay Thai fighter

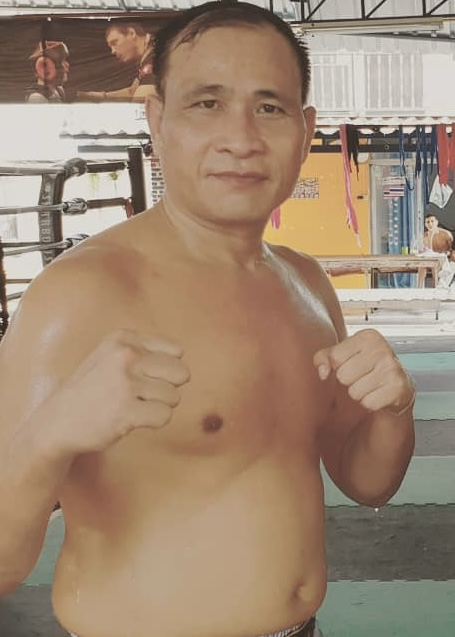
- Silapathai in 2018
- Born: Adul Khunnoi; November 23, 1974 (age 51); Nong Han District, Udon Thani Province, Thailand
- Native name: ศิลปไทย จ๊อกกี้ยิม
- Other names: Silapathai Nor.Siripeung (ศิลปไทย น.ศรีผึ้ง )
- Nickname: The 116 Front Kicks (จอมถีบ 116 ที)
- Height: 162 cm (5 ft 4 in)
- Division: Light Flyweight; Super Flyweight; Super Bantamweight
- Style: Muay Thai (Muay Femur)
- Stance: Orthodox
- Fighting out of: Bangkok, Thailand
- Team: Jocky Gym
- Trainer: Ajarn Pipa
- Years active: c. 1984-2003

Other information
- Occupation: Muay Thai trainer

Adul Khunnoi (Thai: อดุลย์ ขุนน้อย; born November 23, 1974), known professionally as Silapathai Jockygym (Thai: ศิลปไทย จ๊อกกี้ยิม), is a Thai retired Muay Thai fighter. He is a two-division Rajadamnern Stadium champion who was famous in the 1990s. Nicknamed "The 116 Front Kicks", he was especially known for his evasive, kicking style.

== Biography and career ==
Adul Khunnoi was born in Udon Thani province in 1974. His father owned a small local camp and introduced him to Muay Thai at the age of 10. He had around 20 fights for the Sit.Poonsak camp in the Khon Kaen and Udon Thani provinces.
At 12 he joined the Jocky gym in Bangkok where he began being taught by legendary trainer Pipa and received his ring name. He started competing in the outskirts of bangkok at Samrong and Rangsit stadiums until he reached 100 lbs then made his debut at Rajadamnern Stadium. Silapathai won his first major title when he captured the 108 lbs Rajadamnern Stadium belt in 1991, he had 10 wins that year and received the "Fighter of the Year" award from the Rajadamnern Stadium officials he also scored the knockout of the year.

Silapathai beat some of the best fighters of the Muay Thai golden era such as Lakhin Wassandasit, Veeraphol Sahaprom, Karuhat Sor.Supawan, Kaensak Sor.Ploenjit, Boonlai Sor.Thanikul or Chamuekpet Hapalang from who took the Rajadamnern Stadium 122 lbs title in 1994. At his peak his best purses reached 200,000 baht.

Silapathaio shortly retired at the end of the 1990s and attempted a comeback in the early 2000s this time fighting from the Nor.Siripeung gym. Silapathai retired on a win in 2003 when he defeated Phet-Ek Sor.Suwanpakdee by knockout.

After retirement he became a trainer, at first at the Sor.Sirilak camp in Udon Thani province and today at his old camp Jocky Gym which became Skarbowsky Gym.

== Titles and honours ==
- Rajadamnern Stadium
  - 1991 Rajadamnern Stadium Light Flyweight (108 lbs) Champion
    - One successful title defense
  - 1991 Rajadamnern Stadium Technique of the Year (vs Komsan Saknarin)
  - 1992 Rajadamnern Stadium Fighter of the Year
  - 1994 Rajadamnern Stadium Super Bantamweight (122 lbs) Champion
    - One successful title defense

== Fight record ==
Muay Thai Record (Incomplete)
160 Wins (20 KO's), 27 Losses, 3 Draws
Date	Result	Opponent	Event	Location	Method	Round	Time
2003-	Win	(Thailand) Phet-Ek Sor.Suwanpakdee		Bangkok, Thailand	KO	2	
?	Win	(Thailand) Theppitak Sor.Jintana		Sisaket Province, Thailand	Decision	5	3:00
?	Win	(Thailand) Dentoranee Dawee		Bangkok, Thailand	Decision	5	3:00
2000-09-22	Win	(Thailand) Phetarun Sor.Suwanpakdee	Lumpinee Stadium	Bangkok, Thailand	Decision	5	3:00
2000-	Win	(Thailand) Phetnamek Sor.Siriwat	Rajadamnern Stadium	Bangkok, Thailand	Decision	5	3:00
2000-08-24	Win	(Thailand) Chanasak Wanchalerm	Omnoi Stadium - Isuzu Cup	Samut Sakhon, Thailand	Decision	5	3:00
2000-07-21	Loss	(Thailand) Sila Tor.Bangsaen	Lumpinee Stadium	Bangkok, Thailand	Decision	5	3:00
1999-07-24	Loss	(Thailand) Saengmorakot Waenaisapit	Omnoi Stadium	Samut Sakhon, Thailand	Decision	5	3:00
1999-02-30	Loss	(Thailand) Thewaritnoi S.K.V Gym	Omnoi Stadium	Bangkok, Thailand	Decision	5	3:00
1999-01-29	Win	(Thailand) Suwitlek Kaewsisnu	Daorung Sor.Wanchat, Jiraprawat Stadium	Nakhon Sawan, Thailand	Decision	5	3:00
1996-10-16	Loss	(Thailand) Saengmorakot Sor.Ploenchit	Rajadamnern Stadium	Bangkok, Thailand	KO	4	
1996-07-24	Loss	(Thailand) Paidaeng Lersakgym	Rajadamnern Stadium	Bangkok, Thailand	Decision	5	3:00
1996-03-20	Loss	(Thailand) Chutin Por.Tawachai	Rajadamnern Stadium	Bangkok, Thailand	Decision	5	3:00
1996-01-24	Loss	(Thailand) Chutin Por.Tawachai	Rajadamnern Stadium	Bangkok, Thailand	Decision	5	3:00
Loses the Rajadamnern Stadium Super Bantamweight (122 lbs) title.
1995-12-20	Win	(Thailand) Chaidet Kiatchansing	Rajadamnern Stadium 50th Anniversary	Bangkok, Thailand	Decision	5	3:00
1995-11-27	Win	(Thailand) Prapsuek Sitsanthat	Rajadamnern Stadium	Bangkok, Thailand	Decision	5	3:00
1995-10-23	Loss	(Thailand) Muangfahlek Kiatwichian	Rajadamnern Stadium	Bangkok, Thailand	Decision	5	3:00
1995-09-20	Loss	(Thailand) Karuhat Sor.Supawan	Rajadamnern Stadium	Bangkok, Thailand	Decision	5	3:00
1995-07-26	Win	(Thailand) Prapsuek Sitsanthat	Rajadamnern Stadium	Bangkok, Thailand	Decision	5	3:00
1995-05-17	Win	(Thailand) Komkiat Sor.Thanikul	Rajadamnern Stadium	Bangkok, Thailand	Decision	5	3:00
Defends the Rajadamnern Stadium Super Bantamweight (122 lbs) title.
1995-01-18	Loss	(Thailand) Saengmorakot Sor.Ploenchit	Rajadamnern Stadium	Bangkok, Thailand	KO (Left Cross)	1	
1994-12-09	Win	(Thailand) Samkor Chor.Rathchatasupak	Lumpinee Stadium	Bangkok, Thailand	Decision	5	3:00
1994-10-28	Win	(Thailand) Kaensak Sor.Ploenjit	Lumpinee Stadium	Bangkok, Thailand	Decision	5	3:00
1994-09-28	Win	(Thailand) Boonlai Sor.Thanikul	Rajadamnern Stadium	Bangkok, Thailand	KO (High kick & Punches)	2	
1994-08-29	Loss	(Thailand) Choengnoen Sitphutthapim	Rajadamnern Stadium	Bangkok, Thailand	Decision	5	3:00
1994-07-19	Loss	(Thailand) Meechok Sor.Ploenchit	Lumpinee Stadium	Bangkok, Thailand	Decision	5	3:00
1994-06-06	Win	(Thailand) Karuhat Sor.Supawan	Rajadamnern Stadium	Bangkok, Thailand	Decision	5	3:00
1994-04-27	Win	(Thailand) Chamuekpet Hapalang	Rajadamnern Stadium	Bangkok, Thailand	Decision	5	3:00
Wins the Rajadamnern Stadium Super Bantamweight (122 lbs) title.
1994-04-04	Win	(Thailand) Jaiphet Sor.Vorapin	Rajadamnern Stadium	Bangkok, Thailand	Decision	5	3:00
1994-02-28	Win	(Thailand) Ekkachai Sunkilanongkhee	Rajadamnern Stadium	Bangkok, Thailand	Decision	5	3:00
1994-01-19	Win	(Thailand) Komkiat Sor.Thanikul	Rajadamnern Stadium	Bangkok, Thailand	Decision	5	3:00
1993-12-03	Loss	(Thailand) Nungubon Sitlerchai	Lumpinee Stadium	Bangkok, Thailand	Decision	5	3:00
1993-10-27	Win	(Thailand) Prapsuek Sitsanthat	Rajadamnern Stadium	Bangkok, Thailand	Decision	5	3:00
1993-09-15	Win	(Thailand) Ekkachai Sunkilanongkhee	Rajadamnern Stadium	Bangkok, Thailand	Decision	5	3:00
1993-07-28	Win	(Thailand) Veeraphol Sahaprom	Rajadamnern Stadium	Bangkok, Thailand	Decision	5	3:00
1993-06-23	Loss	(Thailand) Veeraphol Sahaprom	Rajadamnern Stadium	Bangkok, Thailand	KO (Left Hook)	5	
For the vacant Rajadamnern Stadium 115 lbs title.
1993-05-19	Win	(Thailand) Lakhin Wassandasit	Rajadamnern Stadium	Bangkok, Thailand	Decision	5	3:00
1993-03-31	Win	(Thailand) Wichan Sitsuchon	Lumpinee Stadium	Bangkok, Thailand	Decision	5	3:00
1993-03-09	Loss	(Thailand) Wichan Sitsuchon	Lumpinee Stadium	Bangkok, Thailand	Decision	5	3:00
1993-02-15	Loss	(Thailand) Singdam Or.Ukrit	Rajadamnern Stadium	Bangkok, Thailand	Decision	5	3:00
1993-01-13	Win	(Thailand) Tukatathong Por.Pongsawang	Rajadamnern Stadium	Bangkok, Thailand	Decision	5	3:00
1992-09-07	Win	(Thailand) Thapisuj Sor.Maliwan	Rajadamnern Stadium	Bangkok, Thailand	Decision	5	3:00
1992-07-28	Loss	(Thailand) Saenklai Sit Kru Od	Lumpinee Stadium	Bangkok, Thailand	Decision	5	3:00
1992-09-07	Win	(Thailand) Samernoi Tor.Boonlert	Rajadamnern Stadium	Bangkok, Thailand	Decision	5	3:00
1992-03-30	Win	(Thailand) Thongchai Sor.Korakot	Rajadamnern Stadium	Bangkok, Thailand	Decision	5	3:00
Defends the Rajadamnern Stadium 108 lbs title.
1992-02-19	Win	(Thailand) Duangdet Sitdanchai	Rajadamnern Stadium	Bangkok, Thailand	Decision	5	3:00
1991-12-23	Win	(Thailand) Namkabuan Ratchapeutkafe	Rajadamnern Stadium	Bangkok, Thailand	Decision	5	3:00
Wins the Rajadamnern Stadium 108 lbs title.
1991-10-21	Loss	(Thailand) Kukkong Por Surasak	Rajadamnern Stadium	Bangkok, Thailand	Decision	5	3:00
1991-09-30	Win	(Thailand) Komsan Saknarin	Rajadamnern Stadium	Bangkok, Thailand	KO (Spinning back elbow)	4	
1991-09-09	Draw	(Thailand) Prapsuek Sitsanthat	Rajadamnern Stadium	Bangkok, Thailand	Decision	5	3:00
1991-08-22	Win	(Thailand) Mankong Seisomboon	Rajadamnern Stadium	Bangkok, Thailand	Decision	5	3:00
1991-08-01	Win	(Thailand) Mankong Seisomboon	Rajadamnern Stadium	Bangkok, Thailand	Decision	5	3:00
1991-02-12	Win	(Thailand) Kwandom Sit Sor.Por.Sor	Rajadamnern Stadium	Bangkok, Thailand	Decision	5	3:00
Legend: Win Loss Draw/No contest Notes
