= Saengmorakot Sor.Ploenchit =

Thai former professional Muay Thai fighter

- Born: Sontaya Thongdee; January 27, 1977 (age 49); Phon, Khon Kaen province, Thailand
- Native name: สนธยา ทองดี
- Other names: Saengmorakot Waenaisapit (แสงมรกต แวร์ไนท์สปีด); Saengmorakot Bangkruai (แสงมรกต ก.บางกรวย); Saengmorakot WongwianYaiPlaza (แสงมรกต วงเวียนใหญ่พลาซ่า)
- Nickname: Pudpadnoi 2 (ผุดผาดน้อย 2)
- Division: Super Bantamweight; Featherweight; Super Featherweight
- Style: Muay Thai (Muay Femur)
- Stance: Orthodox
- Team: Sor.Ploenchit
- Trainer: Pramsing Sor.Thanikul

Sontaya Thongdee (Thai: สนธยา ทองดี; born January 27, 1977), known professionally as Saengmorakot Sor.Ploenchit (Thai: แสงมรกต ส.เพลินจิต), is a Thai former professional Muay Thai fighter. He is a former Omnoi Stadium, WMC, and Isuzu Cup champion who was active during the 1990s and 2000s.

== Biography and career ==
Sontaya Thongdee was born in the village of Phon in Phon, Khon Kaen, Thailand on January 27, 1977. He began training Muay Thai at the age of six years old. He joined the Sor.Ploenchit camp in 1991.

He trained at the Sor.Ploenchit gym alongside fighters such as Kaensak Sor.Ploenjit, Manasak Sor.Ploenchit, Saen Sor Ploenchit, and Meechok Sor.Ploenchit.

He fought during the Golden Era of Muay Thai against many notable fighters including Karuhat Sor.Supawan, Lamnamoon Sor.Sumalee, Wangchannoi Sor.Palangchai, Silapathai Jockygym, Samkor Kiatmontep, Nungubon Sitlerchai, Jaroensap Kiatbanchong, and Sak Kaoponlek.

After retiring as a fighter Saengmorakot became a trainer and currently teaches in Osaka, Japan.

== Titles and accomplishments ==
- Omnoi Stadium
  - 2000 10th Isuzu Cup Tournament Champion
  - 2000 Omnoi Stadium Super Featherweight (130 lbs) Champion
- World Muaythai Council
  - WMC World Super Featherweight (130 lbs) Champion

== Fight record ==
Muay Thai Record (Incomplete)
Date	Result	Opponent	Event	Location	Method	Round	Time
2002-12-14	Loss	(Thailand) Buakaw Por.Pramuk	D4D Toyota Marathon, Lumpinee Stadium, Quarterfinals	Bangkok, Thailand	Decision	5	3:00
2001-05-31	Win	(Thailand) Saenchai Sor.Kingstar	Rajadamnern Stadium	Bangkok, Thailand	Decision	5	3:00
2001-04-05	Draw	(Thailand) Nongbee Kiatyongyut	Rajadamnern Stadium	Bangkok, Thailand	Decision	5	3:00
2001-02-14	Win	(Thailand) Saenchai Sor.Kingstar	Rajadamnern Stadium	Bangkok, Thailand	Decision	5	3:00
Wins the vacant WMC World Super Featherweight (130 lbs) title.
2001-01-07	Win	(Thailand) Lamnamoon Sor.Sumalee	Muay Thai World Heritage	Chachoengsao province, Thailand	Decision	5	3:00
2000-08-24		(Thailand) Rambojiew Por.Thumbtim		Bangkok, Thailand			
2000-08-05	Win	(Thailand) Thewaritnoi S.K.V.Gym	Omnoi Stadium	Samut Sakhon, Thailand	Decision	5	3:00
Wins the Omnoi Stadium Super Featherweight (130 lbs) title.
2000-05-12	Win	(Thailand) Manja Kiattinapachai	Lumpinee Stadium	Bangkok, Thailand	KO	2	
2000-02-12	Win	(Thailand) Ittidet Sor.Boonya	Omnoi Stadium - Isuzu Cup Final	Samut Sakhon, Thailand	Decision	5	3:00
Wins the 10th Isuzu Cup Tournament.
1999-10-23	Win	(Thailand) Tor.Patak Wanchalerm	Omnoi Stadium - Isuzu Cup	Samut Sakhon, Thailand	TKO (Punches)	2	
1999-07-24	Win	(Thailand) Silapathai Nor.Siripeung	Omnoi Stadium	Samut Sakhon, Thailand	Decision	5	3:00
1999-07-06	Loss	(Thailand) Donkings Kiattiphanathai	Lumpinee Stadium	Bangkok, Thailand	Decision	5	3:00
1999-05-21	Win	(Thailand) Manja Kietnapachai	Lumpinee Stadium	Bangkok, Thailand	KO (Left hook)	3	
1999-03-19	Win	(Thailand) Itthidet Sor.Bunya	Lumpinee Stadium	Bangkok, Thailand	Decision	5	3:00
1999-02-27	Win	(Thailand) Fasura Sor.Ploenchit	Omnoi Stadium	Samut Sakhon, Thailand	KO (Punches)	2	
1996-10-16	Win	(Thailand) Silapathai Jockygym	Rajadamnern Stadium	Bangkok, Thailand	KO (Punch)	4	
1995-05-05	Loss	(Thailand) Choengnoen Sitphutthapim	Lumpinee Stadium	Bangkok, Thailand	Decision	5	3:00
1995-01-18	Win	(Thailand) Silapathai Jockygym	Rajadamnern Stadium	Bangkok, Thailand	KO (Punch)	1	
1994-11-29	Win	(Thailand) Lamnamoon Sor.Sumalee	Lumpinee Stadium	Bangkok, Thailand	KO (Punches)	2	
1994-10-10	Win	(Thailand) Wangchannoi Sor.Palangchai	Rajadamnern Stadium	Bangkok, Thailand	TKO (Punches)	3	
1994-08-02	Loss	(Thailand) Karuhat Sor.Supawan	Rajadamnern Stadium	Bangkok, Thailand	Decision	5	3:00
1994-06-28	Win	(Thailand) Nungubon Sitlerchai	Lumpinee Stadium	Bangkok, Thailand	Decision	5	3:00
1994-05-27	Win	(Thailand) Samkor Chor.Rathchatasupak	Lumpinee Stadium	Bangkok, Thailand	Decision	5	3:00
1994-04-29	Win	(Thailand) Kaoponglek Luksuratham	Lumpinee Stadium	Bangkok, Thailand	Decision	5	3:00
1994-04-02	Win	(Thailand) Jaroensap Kiatbanchong	Lumpinee Stadium	Bangkok, Thailand	Decision	5	3:00
1994-02-15	Loss	(Thailand) Yokthai Sithoar	Lumpinee Stadium	Bangkok, Thailand	TKO	4	
1993-11-05	Win	(Thailand) Narunat Kiatpetch			Decision	5	3:00
1993-10-19	Win	(Thailand) Narunat Kiatpetch			Decision	5	3:00
1993-09-14	Win	(Thailand) Rotnarong Daopadriew	Daorung TV 7, Lumpinee Stadium	Bangkok, Thailand	Decision	5	3:00
1993-07-13	Loss	(Thailand) Kaethong Sit Suchon	Lumpinee Stadium	Bangkok, Thailand	Decision	5	3:00
1993-06-26	Draw	(Thailand) Kaethong Sit Suchon			Decision	5	3:00
1993-05-11	Win	(Thailand) Phongsak Lukbanyai			Decision	5	3:00
1993-01-26	Win	(Thailand) Denpatapi Sisakoon			KO	4	
Legend: Win Loss Draw/No contest Notes
