= Veeraphol Sahaprom =

Thai Muay Thai fighter and professional boxer

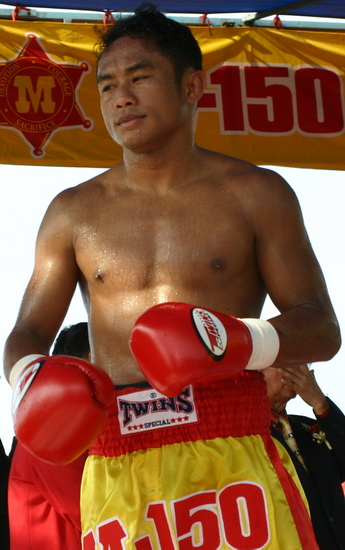
- Veeraphol in 2008
- Born: Theeraphol Samranklang; November 16, 1968 (age 57); Nakhon Ratchasima, Thailand
- Native name: ธีระพล สำราญกลาง
- Other names: Phonchai Kiat Kor.Charoen (พลชัย เกียรติ ก.เจริญ); Veeraphol Nakornluang (วีระพล นครหลวงโปรโมชั่น)
- Nickname: Stoic Tiger (พยัคฆ์หน้าขรึม); Stoic Grim Reaper (พระกาฬหน้าขรึม); Deathmask
- Height: 162 cm (5 ft 4 in)
- Division: Muay Thai: Light Flyweight; Flyweight; Super Flyweight; Boxing: Super Flyweight; Bantamweight
- Reach: 165 cm (65 in)
- Style: Muay Thai (Muay Femur / Muay Mat); Boxing
- Stance: Orthodox
- Years active: 1982–1994, 2017 (Muay Thai); 1994–2010 (Boxing)

Professional boxing record
- Total: 73
- Wins: 66
- By knockout: 47
- Losses: 4
- By knockout: 3
- Draws: 3
- No contests: 0

Kickboxing record
- Total: 197
- Wins: 165
- By knockout: 20
- Losses: 30
- Draws: 2

Other information
- Boxing record from BoxRec

Theeraphol Samranklang (Thai: ธีระพล สำราญกลาง; born November 16, 1968), known professionally as Veeraphol Sahaprom (Thai: วีระพล สหพรหม) or mononymously as Veeraphol, is a Thai retired professional Muay Thai fighter and professional boxer. A three-division Rajadamnern Stadium champion as well as a WBC and WBA bantamweight champion in boxing, he is widely regarded as one of the greatest Muay Thai fighters of all time and also one of the greatest western-style boxers from Thailand. Nicknamed "The Stoic Tiger" or "Deathmask", he was known for never changing his expression when throwing punches. He is also known for his precise jab.

== Early life and Muay Thai ==
Veeraphol Sahaprom was born in Amphoe Mueang Nakhon Ratchasima, Nakhon Ratchasima province, but was raised in Amphoe Kaeng Khoi, Saraburi province, Thailand. He began training in Muay Thai from a young age, initially learning from his brother who forced him to train quite strictly. Veeraphol made his debut in Bangkok in 1985.

Between 1990 and 1994, he gained recognition as a prominent Muay Thai fighter under the Chucharoen "Ung-mor" Raveearamwong stable. During his career in Muay Thai, he faced many notable fighters such as Santos Devy, Silapathai Jockygym, Langsuan Panyuthaphum, Dokmaipa Por Pongsawang, Duangsompong Por Pongsawang, Burklerk Pinsinchai, and ever lost-won with Saenmuangnoi Lukchaopormahesak (Samson Dutch Boy Gym) two times. His highest purse reached 220,000 baht in a fight against Baeber Narupai. Veeraphol won championships at Rajadamnern Stadium in three different weight classes, showcasing his versatility and skill. His final Muay Thai bout was against Saenklai Sit Kru Od at Lumpinee Stadium.

== Boxing career ==
Veeraphol began his professional boxing career in 1994 under the management and promotion of Suchart Pisitwuttinan of Nakornluang Promotion. In his debut fight, he won the WBC International Super Flyweight Title. Remarkably, he challenged for a world title in only his fourth professional fight, defeating fellow Thai titleholder Daorung Chuvatana. At that time, Veeraphol was recognized as one of the boxers who became a world champion in the fewest number of fights, second only to Saensak Muangsurin in the 1970s.

However, Veeraphol lost his first title defense to former WBC Super Flyweight Champion Nana Konadu at Kanchanaburi Stadium, losing the title after just four months.

Three years after losing the WBA world title, Veeraphol earned his second shot at a world title against WBC Bantamweight Champion Joichiro Tatsuyoshi on December 29, 1998. The bout took place in Osaka, Japan, where Veeraphol won by technical knockout in the sixth round, becoming a two-time world champion. He faced Tatsuyoshi again in August 1999 and knocked him out in the seventh round to successfully defend his title for the second time.

Between 1996 and 2005, Veeraphol defended his title 14 times while also winning numerous non-title fights. During his reign, he fought Japanese boxer Toshiaki Nishioka four times, retaining his title in every encounter. Veeraphol eventually lost the WBC Bantamweight Title to Hozumi Hasegawa in a 12-round unanimous decision, ending a reign that lasted over six years.

After losing his title to Hasegawa, Veeraphol fought five non-title bouts, winning all, with four of those wins by knockout. On March 25, 2006, he challenged Hasegawa once again in Kobe to avenge his loss. However, Veeraphol was knocked down by a right hook in the ninth round and was unable to recover. This marked the second knockout loss of his career and was his eighth fight in Japan.

=== Retirement ===
Veeraphol announced his retirement from boxing at the age of 39 following a loss to Vusi Malinga in a world title eliminator on June 12 in Bangkok, Thailand. However, he made a comeback less than a year later on March 20, 2009, when he knocked out Yudi Arema.

After retiring, Veeraphol opened a Thai food restaurant in Chaiyaphum province, his wife's hometown. Sometimes, he even takes time to cook the food himself. He also works as a trainer at the Dabransarakarm gym in Maha Sarakham province.

At the end of 2017, Veeraphol returned to competition again, this time in Muay Thai style. He faced his old rival Samson Dutch Boy Gym in a special bout at Lumpinee Stadium. Despite a strong effort, the 49-year-old Sahaprom lost by decision in front of a large and enthusiastic crowd.

In 2023, American vlogger and fellow Muay Thai practitioner Sylvie von Duuglas-Ittu contacted Veeraphol and filmed an extensive session with him for her Muay Thai Library project.

== Titles and accomplishments ==
Muay Thai

- Rajadamnern Stadium
  - 1987 Rajadamnern Stadium Light Flyweight (108 lbs) Champion
  - 1988 Rajadamnern Stadium Flyweight (112 lbs) Champion
  - 1993 Rajadamnern Stadium Super Flyweight (115 lbs) Champion
    - Two successful title defenses
  - 1993 Rajadamnern Stadium Fighter of the Year

Boxing

- World Boxing Council
  - 1994 WBC International Super Flyweight (115 lbs) Champion
    - One successful title defenses
  - 1998 WBC World Bantamweight (118 lbs) Champion
    - Fourteen successful title defenses
- World Boxing Association
  - 1995 WBA World Bantamweight (118 lbs) Champion

== Muay Thai record ==
Muay Thai Record (Incomplete)
165 Wins (20 KO's), 30 Losses, 2 Draws
Date	Result	Opponent	Event	Location	Method	Round	Time
2017-12-17	Loss	(Thailand) Samson Petchyindee	Petchyindee, Lumpinee Stadium	Bangkok, Thailand	Decision	5	3:00
1994-09-23	Win	(Thailand) Saenklai SitKruOd	Daorungtvsi 7, Lumpinee Stadium	Bangkok, Thailand	Decision	5	3:00
1994-08-11	Win	(Thailand) Michael Chalermsri	Aswindam, Rajadamnern Stadium	Bangkok, Thailand	KO (Punches)	3	
1994-06-22	Win	(Thailand) Chatchainoi Chaoraioi	Rajadamnern Stadium	Bangkok, Thailand	Decision	5	3:00
Defends the Rajadamnern Stadium Super Flyweight (115 lbs) title.
1994-05-19	Loss	(Thailand) Burklerk Pinsinchai	Aswindam, Rajadamnern Stadium	Bangkok, Thailand	Decision	5	3:00
1994-04-07	Win	(Thailand) Sukhothai Taximeter	Aswindam, Rajadamnern Stadium	Bangkok, Thailand	Decision	5	3:00
1994-02-17	Win	(Thailand) Duangsompong Por.Pongsawang	Aswindam, Rajadamnern Stadium	Bangkok, Thailand	KO (Right cross)	5	
Defends the Rajadamnern Stadium Super Flyweight (115 lbs) title.
1994-01-06	Win	(Thailand) Dokmaipa Por.Pongsawang	Aswindam, Rajadamnern Stadium	Bangkok, Thailand	Decision	5	3:00
1993-12-13	Win	(Thailand) Burklerk Pinsinchai	Aswindam, Rajadamnern Stadium	Bangkok, Thailand	KO (Right cross)	2	
1993-10-14	Win	(Thailand) Jaroensak Or.Nueangjamnong	Aswindam, Rajadamnern Stadium	Bangkok, Thailand	Decision	5	3:00
1993-09-16	Win	(Thailand) Langsuan Panyuthaphum	Aswindam, Lumpinee Stadium	Bangkok, Thailand	KO (Left hook)	3	
1993-07-28	Loss	(Thailand) Silapathai Jockygym	Kiatphetnoi, Rajadamnern Stadium	Bangkok, Thailand	Decision	5	3:00
1993-06-23	Win	(Thailand) Silapathai Jockygym	Daorungchucharoen, Rajadamnern Stadium	Bangkok, Thailand	KO (Left hook)	5	
Wins the vacant Rajadamnern Stadium Super Flyweight (115 lbs) title.
1993-05-28	Loss	(Thailand) Singdam Or.Ukrit	Daorungtvsi 7, Lumpinee Stadium	Bangkok, Thailand	Decision	5	3:00
1993-05-11	Win	(Thailand) Saenmuangnoi Lukchaopormahesak	Thahansuea, Lumpinee Stadium	Bangkok, Thailand	KO (Punches)	2	
1993-04-02	Win	(Thailand) Chatchainoi Chaoraioi	Chor.Por.Ror. 7 + Petchyindee, Lumpinee Stadium	Bangkok, Thailand	Decision	5	3:00
1993-03-08	Loss	(Thailand) Burklerk Pinsinchai	Asawindam, Rajadamnern Stadium	Bangkok, Thailand	Decision	5	3:00
1993-02-19	Win	(Thailand) Kiewmorakot Prainan	Petchyindee, Lumpinee Stadium	Bangkok, Thailand	KO (Low kick & punches)	2	
1993-01-31	Loss	(Thailand) Saenklai SitKruOd	Daorungchucharoen, Rajadamnern Stadium	Bangkok, Thailand	Decision	5	3:00
1992-12-25	Loss	(Thailand) Saenklai SitKruOd	Chaomangkon, Lumpinee Stadium	Bangkok, Thailand	Decision	5	3:00
1992-11-26	Loss	(Thailand) Dejrit Sor.Ploenchit	Asawindam + Daorungchucharoen, Rajadamnern Stadium	Bangkok, Thailand	KO	3	
1992-10-28	Win	(Thailand) Chatpichit Naphapol	Daorungchucharoen, Rajadamnern Stadium	Bangkok, Thailand	KO	3	
1992-09-24	Loss	(Thailand) Saenkeng Pinsinchai	Asawindam, Rajadamnern Stadium	Bangkok, Thailand	Decision	5	3:00
1992-05-27	Win	(Thailand) Nungubon Sitlerchai	Daorungchucharoen, Lumpinee Stadium	Bangkok, Thailand	Decision	5	3:00
1992-05-05	Win	(Thailand) Dokmaipa Por.Pongsawang	Daorungtvsi 7, Lumpinee Stadium	Bangkok, Thailand	Decision	5	3:00
1992-03-18	Win	(Thailand) Noppadet Sor.Rewadee	Daorungchucharoen, Rajadamnern Stadium	Bangkok, Thailand	KO (Right hook)	3	
1992-02-20	Win	(Thailand) Wanwiset Kaennorasing	Daorungchucharoen, Rajadamnern Stadium	Bangkok, Thailand	KO (Punch)	4	
1992-01-15	Loss	(Thailand) Noppadet Sor.Rewadee	Daorungchucharoen, Rajadamnern Stadium	Bangkok, Thailand	Decision	5	3:00
1991-11-29	Win	(Thailand) Duangsompomg Por.Pongsawang	Petchyindee, Lumpinee Stadium	Bangkok, Thailand	Decision	5	3:00
1991-10-30	Loss	(Thailand) Saenmuangnoi Lukchaopormahesak	Daorungchucharoen, Rajadamnern Stadium	Bangkok, Thailand	KO (Left cross)	2	
1991-09-19	Win	(Thailand) Baber Pinsinchai	Asawindam, Rajadamnern Stadium	Bangkok, Thailand	Decision	5	3:00
1991-08-23	Win	(Thailand) Saenklai SitKruOd	Petchyindee, Lumpinee Stadium	Bangkok, Thailand	Decision	5	3:00
1991-06-24	Win	(Thailand) Karuhat Sor.Supawan	Daorungchucharoen, Rajadamnern Stadium	Bangkok, Thailand	Decision	5	3:00
1991-05-08	Win	(Thailand) Dennuea Denmolee	Daorungchucharoen, Rajadamnern Stadium	Bangkok, Thailand	TKO (Punches)	3	
1991-03-21	Loss	(Thailand) Panomrung Sit Sor.Wor.Por.	Daorungchucharoen, Rajadamnern Stadium	Bangkok, Thailand	Decision	5	3:00
1991-01-17	Win	(Thailand) Ekkapon Chuwattana	Daorungchucharoen, Rajadamnern Stadium	Bangkok, Thailand	Decision	5	3:00
1990-12-10	Win	(Thailand) Noppadet Sor.Rewadee	Phetthongkham, Rajadamnern Stadium	Bangkok, Thailand	Decision	5	3:00
1990-11-14	Loss	(Thailand) Boonam Chor.Waikul	Wanmuaythai, Rajadamnern Stadium	Bangkok, Thailand	Decision	5	3:00
1990-10-22	Draw	(Thailand) Kaensak Sor.Ploenjit	Yodnuamthong, Rajadamnern Stadium	Bangkok, Thailand	Decision	5	3:00
1990-09-27	Win	(Thailand) Noppadet Sor.Rewadee	Yodnuamthong, Rajadamnern Stadium	Bangkok, Thailand	Decision	5	3:00
1990-08-30	Win	(Thailand) Noppadet Sor.Rewadee	Daorungchucharoen, Rajadamnern Stadium	Bangkok, Thailand	Decision	5	3:00
1990-08-06	Win	(Thailand) Ratchapracha Na Pattaya	Yodnuamthong, Rajadamnern Stadium	Bangkok, Thailand	KO (Right cross)	4	
1990-07-19	Win	(Thailand) Thanongdej Kiatpayathai	Phettawanok, Rajadamnern Stadium	Bangkok, Thailand	TKO (Punches)	3	
1990-06-24	Loss	(Thailand) Dejrit Sor.Ploenchit	Rajadamnern Stadium	Bangkok, Thailand	Decision	5	3:00
1990-05-31	Win	(Thailand) Chain Narupai	Daorungchucharoen, Rajadamnern Stadium	Bangkok, Thailand	KO (Left hook)	3	
1990-04-26	Win	(Thailand) Deenung Thor.Phattanakit	Daorungchucharoen, Rajadamnern Stadium	Bangkok, Thailand	Decision	5	3:00
1990-03-22	Loss	(Thailand) Dejrit Sor.Ploenchit	Yodnuamthong, Rajadamnern Stadium	Bangkok, Thailand	Decision	5	3:00
1990-02-15	Loss	(Thailand) Suwitlek Lookbangplasoi	Daorungchucharoen, Rajadamnern Stadium	Bangkok, Thailand	Decision	5	3:00
1990-01-11	Loss	(Thailand) Santos Devy	Daorungchucharoen, Rajadamnern Stadium	Bangkok, Thailand	Decision	5	3:00
1989-12-14	Win	(Thailand) Colalek Sor.Thanikul	Mumnamnguen, Rajadamnern Stadium	Bangkok, Thailand	KO (Punches)	3	
1989-10-06	Loss	(Thailand) Karuhat Sor.Supawan	Yodmuaylok, Lumpinee Stadium	Bangkok, Thailand	Decision	5	3:00
1989-09-05	Win	(Thailand) Toto Por.Pongsawang	Yodmuaydang, Lumpinee Stadium	Bangkok, Thailand	TKO (Punches)	2	
1989-08-24	Win	(Thailand) Odnoi Lukprabath	Daorungchucharoen, Rajadamnern Stadium	Bangkok, Thailand	Decision	5	3:00
1989-06-13	Loss	(Thailand) Toto Por.Pongsawang	Lumpinee Stadium	Bangkok, Thailand	TKO (leg injury)		
1989-05-12	Draw	(Thailand) Panphet Muangsurin	Onesongchai, Lumpinee Stadium	Bangkok, Thailand	Decision	5	3:00
1989-04-20	Win	(Thailand) Hippy Singmanee	Daorungchucharoen, Rajadamnern Stadium	Bangkok, Thailand	Decision	5	3:00
1989-01-15	Loss	(Thailand) Dennuea Denmolee	2 Chaobanlanglok, Crocodile Farm	Samut Prakan, Thailand	Decision	5	3:00
Loses the Rajadamnern Stadium Flyweight (112 lbs) title.
1988-11-25	Loss	(Thailand) Karuhat Sor.Supawan	Onesongchai, Lumpinee Stadium	Bangkok, Thailand	Decision	5	3:00
1988-11-04	Loss	(Thailand) Hippy Singmanee	Onesongchai, Lumpinee Stadium	Bangkok, Thailand	Decision	5	3:00
1988-10-13	Loss	(Thailand) Langsuan Panyuthaphum	Daorungchucharoen, Rajadamnern Stadium	Bangkok, Thailand	Decision	5	3:00
1988-07-26	Win	(Thailand) Paruhatlek Sitchunthong	Onesongchai, Lumpinee Stadium	Bangkok, Thailand	Decision	5	3:00
1988-04-15	Win	(Thailand) Hippy Singmanee	Wanpattani, Ram Komut Stadium	Pattani, Thailand	Decision	5	3:00
1988-03-24	Win	(Thailand) Samernoi Tor.Boonlert	IBF Mini Flyweight World Championship, Rajadamnern Stadium	Bangkok, Thailand	Decision	5	3:00
Wins the Rajadamnern Stadium Flyweight (112 lbs) title.
1987-12-31	Win	(Thailand) Sakchai Wongwianyai	Rajadamnern Stadium	Bangkok, Thailand	Decision	5	3:00
1987-10-12	Win	(Thailand) Phiewphong Hongphapparichat	2 Chaobanlanglok, Rajadamnern Stadium	Bangkok, Thailand	Decision	5	3:00
Wins the vacant Rajadamnern Stadium Light Flyweight (108 lbs) title.
1987-08-18	Win	(Thailand) Kwanjai Petchyindee	Daorungtvsi 7, Lumpinee Stadium	Bangkok, Thailand	Decision	5	3:00
1987-06-24	Win	(Thailand) Daotrang Tor.Boonlert	Daorungchucharoen, Rajadamnern Stadium	Bangkok, Thailand	Decision	5	3:00
1987-05-12	Loss	(Thailand) Sakchai Wongwianyai	Thahansuea, Lumpinee Stadium	Bangkok, Thailand	Decision	5	3:00
1987-04-09	Win	(Thailand) Eddie Sitwatsiripong	Rajadamnern Stadium	Bangkok, Thailand	Decision	5	3:00
1987-03-02	Win	(Thailand) Makan Sor.Ploenchit	Daorungchucharoen, Rajadamnern Stadium	Bangkok, Thailand	Decision	5	3:00
1987-02-05	Win	(Thailand) Luksing Chuwattana	Daorungchucharoen, Rajadamnern Stadium	Bangkok, Thailand	TKO	5	
1987-01-05	Loss	(Thailand) Chutchong Por.Worawut	Phetthongkham, Rajadamnern Stadium	Bangkok, Thailand	Decision	5	
1986-10-29	Loss	(Thailand) Suriyannoi Kiatyodphayak	Wanmuaythai, Rajadamnern Stadium	Bangkok, Thailand	Decision	5	
1986-09-24	Win	(Thailand) Kengklai Sitsoei	Wanmuaythai, Rajadamnern Stadium	Bangkok, Thailand	Decision	5	
1986-07-30	Draw	(Thailand) Thepchai Lukthapfa	Thalomphasutha, Rajadamnern Stadium	Bangkok, Thailand	Decision	5	
1982-1983	Win	(Thailand) Singyoen Singisel		Thailand	KO (Punches)	4	
Veeraphol's first fight.
Legend: Win Loss Draw/No contest Notes

== Professional boxing record ==
72 fights	66 wins	4 losses
By knockout	46	3
By decision	20	1
Draws	2	

No.	Result	Record	Opponent	Type	Round, time	Date	Location	Notes
72	Win	66–4–2	(Indonesia) Vicky Tahumil	TKO	2 (6)	2010-04-23	(Thailand) Municipality of Nonpek, Phayu	
71	Win	65–4–2	(Indonesia) Alex Buckie	PTS	6	2010-11-05	(Thailand) Meanburi Market, Bangkok	
70	Win	64–4–2	(Indonesia) Singo Kinaro	TKO	4 (8)	2009-08-14	(Thailand) Ban Phai, Khon Kaen	
69	Win	63–4–2	(Indonesia) Christian Sianturi	KO	2 (6)	2009-07-17	(Thailand) Central Market of Ladsawai, Lamlooka, Pathum Thani	
68	Win	62–4–2	(Indonesia) Ansori Anhar	KO	4 (6)	2009-05-29	(Thailand) Temporary Boxing Arena, Kalasin	
67	Win	61–4–2	(Indonesia) Yudi Arema	KO	3 (6)	2009-03-20	(Thailand) Provincial Sport Complex, Trang	
66	Loss	60–4–2	(South Africa) Vusi Malinga	TKO	4 (12)	2008-06-12	(Thailand) Bodindecha School, Bang Kruai	For vacant WBC interim bantamweight title
65	Win	60–3–2	(Japan) Kentaro Nakayama	KO	3 (8)	2008-02-22	(Thailand) Tupatemi Airforce Central Stadium, Bangkok	
64	Win	59–3–2	(Philippines) Richard Laano	UD	12	2007-11-27	(Thailand) Kemapitaram School, Nonthaburi	
63	Win	58–3–2	(Philippines) Reman Salim	UD	8	2007-09-20	(Thailand) Bangplama School, Suphan Buri	
62	Win	57–3–2	(Japan) Makoto Tanigawa	KO	7 (10)	2007-08-17	(Thailand) Phatthalung	
61	Win	56–3–2	(Japan) Satoshi Usui	TKO	4 (8)	2007-07-06	(Thailand) Wat Chao, Bang Kruai	
60	Win	55–3–2	(Japan) Satoshi Niwa	UD	8	2007-05-01	(Thailand) Nonthaburi	
59	Win	54–3–2	(Japan) Koji Fujiwara	TKO	3 (8)	2006-12-01	(Thailand) Nonthaburi Pier, Nonthaburi	
58	Win	53–3–2	(Tanzania) Maiko Yombayomba	TKO	4 (10)	2006-11-10	(Thailand) The Mall Shopping Center Bangkae, Bangkok	
57	Win	52–3–2	(Tanzania) Pascal Mhagama	TKO	3 (10)	2006-08-18	(Thailand) Pathum Thani	
56	Loss	51–3–2	(Japan) Hozumi Hasegawa	TKO	9 (12)	2006-03-25	(Japan) World Memorial Hall, Kobe	For WBC bantamweight title
55	Win	51–2–2	(Tanzania) Scari Korori	KO	1 (10)	2006-02-17	(Thailand) Nonthaburi	
54	Win	50–2–2	(Philippines) Rey Llagas	KO	2 (10)	2005-12-06	(Thailand) Nonthaburi	
53	Win	49–2–2	(Philippines) Roger Galicia	KO	4 (10)	2005-11-04	(Thailand) Si Prachan	
52	Win	48–2–2	(Philippines) Joel Bauya	UD	10	2005-08-25	(Thailand) Manorom	
51	Win	47–2–2	(Philippines) Noel Sungahid	KO	5 (10)	2005-06-24	(Thailand) The Mall Shopping Center Ngamwongwan, Bangkok	
50	Loss	46–2–2	(Japan) Hozumi Hasegawa	UD	12	2005-04-16	(Japan) Nippon Budokan	Lost WBC bantamweight title
49	Win	46–1–2	(Philippines) Allan Fuentes	KO	3 (10)	2005-02-22	(Thailand) Chaophraya Pier, Pathum Thani	
48	Win	45–1–2	(Tanzania) Oscar Manyuka	TKO	2 (6)	2004-11-26	(Thailand) Nonthaburi	
47	Win	44–1–2	(Mexico) Cecilio Santos	UD	12	2004-09-11	(Thailand) Chaophraya Dam's Ground, Chainart	Retained WBC bantamweight title
46	Win	43–1–2	(Tanzania) Rajabu Maoja	TKO	5 (10)	2004-06-26	(Thailand) 700 Years Anniversary Sports St., Chiang Mai	
45	Win	42–1–2	(Mexico) Julio Cesar Avila	TKO	12 (12)	2004-05-01	(Thailand) Nong Khai	Retained WBC bantamweight title
44	Win	41–1–2	(Japan) Toshiaki Nishioka	UD	12	2004-03-06	(Japan) Super Arena, Saitama	Retained WBC bantamweight title
43	Draw	40–1–2	(Japan) Toshiaki Nishioka	SD	12 (12)	2003-10-04	(Japan) Kokugikan	Retained WBC bantamweight title
42	Win	40–1–1	(Mexico) Hugo Dianzo	UD	12	2003-05-01	(Thailand) The Mall Shopping Center Bangkae, Bangkok	Retained WBC bantamweight title
41	Win	39–1–1	(Philippines) Nathan Barcelona	UD	6	2003-01-13	(Thailand) Channel 7 Studios, Bangkok	
40	Win	38–1–1	(Philippines) Dean Bermudez	TKO	3 (6)	2002-08-24	(Thailand) Channel 7 Studios, Bangkok	
39	Win	37–1–1	(Colombia) Julio Coronel	UD	12	2002-05-01	(Thailand) Rama V Bridge, Nonthaburi	Retained WBC bantamweight title
38	Win	36–1–1	(Philippines) Noel Sugahid	KO	4 (10)	2002-03-30	(Thailand) Nonthaburi	
37	Win	35–1–1	(Mexico) Sergio Perez	UD	12	2002-01-11	(Thailand) Thanyaburi	Retained WBC bantamweight title
36	Win	34–1–1	(Philippines) Pablo Boy Guevarra	TKO	7 (8)	2001-10-19	(Thailand) Bangkok	
35	Draw	33–1–1	(Japan) Toshiaki Nishioka	SD	12	2001-09-01	(Japan) Arena, Yokohama	Retained WBC bantamweight title
34	Win	33–1	(Philippines) Dean Bermudez	TKO	4 (8)	2001-07-12	(Thailand) Bangkok	
33	Win	32–1	(Mexico) Ricardo Barajas	KO	3 (12)	2001-05-14	(France) Palais des Sports, Paris	Retained WBC bantamweight title
32	Win	31–1	(Mexico) Roberto Lopez	RTD	7 (10)	2001-03-12	(France) Palais des Sports, Paris	
31	Win	30–1	(Indonesia) Hasan Ambon	UD	6	2001–01–30	(Thailand) Bangkok	
30	Win	29–1	(Mexico) Oscar Arciniega	TKO	5 (12)	2000-12-05	(Thailand) Royal Promenade-Sanam Luang, Bangkok	Retained WBC bantamweight title
29	Win	28–1	(Philippines) Jaime Barcelona	TKO	5 (10)	2000-08-16	(Thailand) Bangkok	
28	Win	27–1	(Japan) Toshiaki Nishioka	UD	12	2000-06-25	(Japan) City Sogo Gym, Takasago	Retained WBC bantamweight title
27	Win	26–1	(Mexico) Adan Vargas	UD	12	2000-03-11	(Thailand) Municipal Stadium, Aranyaprathet	Retained WBC bantamweight title
26	Win	25–1	(Philippines) Nathan Barcelona	TKO	8 (10)	2000-01-19	(Thailand) Bangkok	
25	Win	24–1	(Philippines) Dondon Lapuz	KO	5 (10)	1999-11-17	(Thailand) Bangkok	
24	Win	23–1	(Japan) Joichiro Tatsuyoshi	TKO	7 (12)	1999-08-29	(Japan) Osaka Dome, Osaka	Retained WBC bantamweight title
23	Win	22–1	(Uruguay) Mauro Blanc	KO	5 (12)	1999-05-21	(Thailand) National Stadium, Sara Buri	Retained WBC bantamweight title
22	Win	21–1	(Japan) Joichiro Tatsuyoshi	KO	6 (12)	1998-12-29	(Japan) Central Gym, Osaka	Won WBC bantamweight title
21	Win	20–1	(Philippines) Ricarte Cainiela	TKO	7 (?)	1998–10–21	(Thailand) Bangkok	
20	Win	19–1	(Mongolia) Choi Tseveenpurev	PTS	10	1998-08-19	(Thailand) Bangkok	
19	Win	18–1	(Philippines) Buddy Ledama	KO	4 (?)	1998-06-17	(Thailand) Bangkok	
18	Win	17–1	(Philippines) Joven Jorda	TKO	6 (?)	1998-03-18	(Thailand) Bangkok	
17	Win	16–1	(Philippines) Joel Avila	KO	5 (?)	1998-01-21	(Thailand) Bangkok	
16	Win	15–1	(Philippines) Jess Maca	PTS	10	1997-11-19	(Thailand) Bangkok	
15	Win	14–1	(Philippines) Allan Morre	TKO	6 (10)	1997-09-17	(Thailand) Bangkok	
14	Win	13–1	(Philippines) Joel Nice	TKO	3 (10)	1997-07-04	(Thailand) Pattani	
13	Win	12–1	(Philippines) Pinoy Montejo	TKO	4 (10)	1997-05-21	(Thailand) Channel 7 Studios, Bangkok	
12	Win	11–1	(Philippines) Rolando Pascua	UD	10	1997-04-07	(Thailand) New Worlde Shopping Centre, Nonthaburi	
11	Win	10–1	(Philippines) Joven Jorda	TD	6 (10)	1997-02-15	(Thailand) Nakornpanom Stadium, Nakhon Phanom	
10	Win	9–1	(Philippines) Jojo Torres	TKO	3 (10)	1996-12-05	(Thailand) Nonthaburi Pier, Nonthaburi	
9	Win	8–1	(Philippines) Baby Lorona Jr.	UD	10	1996-10-16	(Thailand) Channel 7 Studios, Bangkok	
8	Win	7–1	(Philippines) Joel Junio	TKO	4 (10)	1996-09-01	(Thailand) New World Shopping Center, Nonthaburi	
7	Win	6–1	(Mexico) Willy Salazar	TKO	6 (10)	1996-06-15	(Thailand) New World Shopping Center, Nonthaburi	
6	Win	5–1	(Philippines) Ledion Ceniza	TKO	9 (10)	1996-04-06	(Thailand) New World Shopping Center, Nonthaburi	
5	Loss	4–1	(Ghana) Nana Konadu	TKO	2 (12)	1996-01-28	(Thailand) Municipal Stadium, Kanchanaburi	Lost WBA bantamweight title
4	Win	4–0	(Thailand) Daorung Chuvatana	SD	12	1995-09-17	(Thailand) Siam Jusco Shopping Center, Nonthaburi	Won WBA bantamweight title
3	Win	3–0	(Indonesia) Abdi Pohan	TKO	5 (?)	1995-06-04	(Thailand) Siam Jusco Shopping Center, Nonthaburi	
2	Win	2–0	(Philippines) Melvin Mangramo	TKO	9 (12)	1995-03-26	(Thailand) Bangkok	Retained WBC International super flyweight title
1	Win	1–0	(Philippines) Joel Junio	TKO	3 (12)	1994-12-05	(Thailand) Siam Jusco Shopping Center, Nonthaburi	Won WBC International super flyweight title

== See also ==
- List of WBC world champions

Preceded by Daorung Chuvatana	WBA Bantamweight Champion; September 17, 1995 - January 28, 1996	Succeeded by Nana Konadu
Preceded by Joichiro Tatsuyoshi	WBC Bantamweight Champion; December 29, 1998 - April 16, 2005	Succeeded by Hozumi Hasegawa
