= Burklerk Pinsinchai =

Thai professional Muay Thai fighter

- Born: Sakorn Yindeechat (สาคร ยินดีชาติ); June 30, 1966 (age 60); Nang Rong, Buriram Province, Thailand
- Native name: สุรชัย ยินดีชาติ
- Other names: Burklerk Narupai (เบิกฤกษ์ นฤภัย)
- Nickname: Powerhouse from Nang Rong (จอมพลังจากนางรอง)
- Height: 160 cm (5 ft 3 in)
- Division: Flyweight; Super Flyweight; Bantamweight
- Style: Muay Thai (Muay Femur)
- Stance: Orthodox
- Team: Pinsinchai Gym
- Years active: c. 1975–1996

Other information
- Occupation: Muay Thai fighter (retired); Muay Thai trainer
- Boxing record from BoxRec

Surachai Yindeechat (Thai: สุรชัย ยินดีชาติ; born Sakorn Yindeechat Thai: สาคร ยินดีชาติ; June 30, 1966), known professionally as Burklerk Pinsinchai (Thai: เบิกฤกษ์ ปิ่นสินชัย), is a Thai former professional Muay Thai fighter. He is a former two-time Lumpinee Stadium Flyweight Champion who was famous during the 1980s and 1990s.

== Biography and career ==
Burklerk was born in 1966 in the Buriram Province where his father initiated him into Muay Thai at the age of 9. In 1977 Burklerk moved to Bangkok to join the Pinsinchai camp owned by Lieutenant Savek Pinsinchai. He was initially too small to compete in Bangkok and fought mostly in Rangsit, Samrong and Chaophraya.

Burklerk emerged as a high level fighter in 1983 when he won his first Thailand title. By 1987 he was considered one of the best fighter in the country having won two Thailand titles and being the reigning Lumpinee Stadium 112 lbs champion. For his performance he was elected Lumpinee Fighter of the Year and received the "Yod Muay Fighter of the year" award.

After losing his Lumpinee Stadium 112 lbs belt in 1987 Burklerk took a break of over 3 years in order to heal a chronic stomach disease.

Burklerk made his comeback in 1991 and quickly regained his elite fighter status, he reached the final of the annual Isuzu Cup where he lost to Lakhin Wassandasit. He fought more sporadically during this second career but with a high level of success against top opposition.

Following his retirement Burklerk became a trainer and in 2008 opened his gym in Lampang. Burklerk gives seminars in various countries and was awarded "Muay Thai Ambassador of the Year" in 2010. His most successful student is Thepsutin Pumpanmuang (Thailand and Channel 7 champion).

Burklerk also tried himself at boxing having a single and only fight. He won by TKO against a debuting Filipino boxer, Jun Komer. He sent Komer down for an eight count in the second round and again at the beginning of the fifth round in an event at the Imperial World Lat Phrao, Bangkok on December 1, 2006.

== Titles and accomplishments ==
- Lumpinee Stadium
  - 1986 Lumpinee Stadium Flyweight (112 lbs) Champion
    - One successful title defense
  - 1986 Lumpinee Stadium Fighter of the Year
  - 1987 Lumpinee Stadium Flyweight (112 lbs) Champion
- Professional Boxing Association of Thailand
  - 1983 Thailand Champion
  - 1984 Thailand Champion

== Fight record ==
Muay Thai record
Date	Result	Opponent	Event	Location	Method	Round	Time
1996-10-17	Win	(Thailand) Phongpayak Thammakasem	Lumpinee Stadium	Bangkok, Thailand	Decision	5	3:00
1996-06-06	Win	(Thailand) Phongpayak Thammakasem	Lumpinee Stadium	Bangkok, Thailand	Decision	5	3:00
?	Win	(Thailand) Kompayak Porpramook		Bangkok, Thailand	Decision	5	3:00
1995-03-30	Loss	(Thailand) Kasemlek Kiatsiri	Rajadamnern Stadium	Bangkok, Thailand	KO	2	
1994-11-30	Loss	(Thailand) Rotnarong Daopadriew	Rajadamnern Stadium	Bangkok, Thailand	KO (Right Cross)	1	
For the Rajadamnern Stadium Bantamweight (118 lbs) title.
1994-05-19	Win	(Thailand) Veeraphol Sahaprom	Aswindam, Rajadamnern Stadium	Bangkok, Thailand	Decision	5	3:00
1994-02-10	Win	(Thailand) Suktothai Taximeter	Rajadamnern Stadium	Bangkok, Thailand	Decision	5	3:00
1993-12-13	Loss	(Thailand) Veeraphol Sahaprom	Rajadamnern Stadium	Bangkok, Thailand	KO (Punches)	2	
1993-09-16	Loss	(Thailand) Dokmaipa Por Pongsawang	Rajadamnern Stadium	Bangkok, Thailand	Decision	5	3:00
1993-08-16	Win	(Thailand) Dokmaipa Por Pongsawang		Thailand	Decision	5	3:00
1993-05-17	Win	(Thailand) Tukatathong Por.Pongsawang	Rajadamnern Stadium	Bangkok, Thailand	KO (Right cross)	4	
1993-03-08	Win	(Thailand) Veeraphol Sahaprom	Rajadamnern Stadium	Bangkok, Thailand	Decision	5	3:00
1993-01-26	Win	(Thailand) Wichan Sitsuchon		Bangkok, Thailand	Decision	5	3:00
1992-10-30	Loss	(Thailand) Saenklai Sit Kru Od	Lumpinee Stadium	Bangkok, Thailand	Decision	5	3:00
1992-03-19	Loss	(Thailand) Lakhin Wassandasit	Rajadamnern Stadium – Isuzu Tournament, Final	Bangkok, Thailand	Decision	5	3:00
For the Rajadamnern Stadium Super Flyweight (115 lbs) title and the Isuzu Cup title.
1991-10-03	Win	(Thailand) Dennuea Denmolee	Aswindam, Rajadamnern Stadium – Isuzu Tournament	Thailand	Decision	5	3:00
1991-08-15	Loss	(Thailand) Lakhin Wassandasit	Rajadamnern Stadium – Isuzu Tournament	Bangkok, Thailand	TKO (Punches)	1	
1991-04-27	Win	(Thailand) Deenueng Thor.Pattanakit	Aswindam	Pattaya, Thailand	Decision	5	3:00
1987-08-28	Loss	(Thailand) Dokmaipa Por Pongsawang	Lumpinee Stadium	Bangkok, Thailand	Decision	5	3:00
Loses the Lumpinee Stadium Flyweight (112 lbs) title.
1987-07-24	Win	(Thailand) Kwayrong Sit Samthahan	Lumpinee Stadium	Bangkok, Thailand	Decision	5	3:00
Wins the Lumpinee Stadium Flyweight (112 lbs) title.
1987-06-24	Win	(Thailand) Boonam Sor.Jarunee	Lumpinee Stadium	Bangkok, Thailand	Decision	5	3:00
1987-05-19	Win	(Thailand) Odnoi Lukprabat	Onesongchai, Lumpinee Stadium	Bangkok, Thailand	Decision	5	3:00
1987-04-10	Win	(Thailand) Paruhatlek Sitchunthong	Lumpinee Stadium	Bangkok, Thailand	Decision	5	3:00
1987-02-06	Loss	(Thailand) Kwayrong Sit Samthahan	Lumpinee Stadium	Bangkok, Thailand	Decision	5	3:00
Loses the Lumpinee Stadium Flyweight (112 lbs) title.
1986-11-25	Win	(Thailand) Paruhatlek Sitchunthong	Lumpinee Stadium	Bangkok, Thailand	Decision	5	3:00
Defends the Lumpinee Stadium Flyweight (112 lbs) title.
1986-09-09	Win	(Thailand) Odnoi Lukprabat	Lumpinee Stadium	Bangkok, Thailand	Decision	5	3:00
Wins the Lumpinee Stadium Flyweight (112 lbs) title.
1986-08-22	Win	(Thailand) Sithichai Monsongkram	Rajadamnern Stadium	Bangkok, Thailand	Decision	5	3:00
1986-08-	Win	(Thailand) Meeded Sitlaongchai		Rangsit, Thailand	KO	1	
1986-06-23	Win	(Thailand) Morakot Chiangym	Rajadamnern Stadium	Bangkok, Thailand	KO	3	
1986-05-10	Win	(Thailand) Wiratnoi Kiatirataphon		Hat Yai, Thailand	Decision	5	3:00
1986-05-01	Draw	(Thailand) Lukchang Sitchang	Rajadamnern Stadium	Bangkok, Thailand	Decision	5	3:00
1986-02-21	Win	(Thailand) Kaosanit Sor Ploenchit	Lumpinee Stadium	Bangkok, Thailand	Decision	5	3:00
1985-11-12	Loss	(Thailand) Morakot Chernyim	Kiatsompop, Lumpinee Stadium	Bangkok, Thailand	KO	4	
1985-08-13	Loss	(Thailand) Ngoen Sor.Ploenchit	Chaomangkon, Lumpinee Stadium	Bangkok, Thailand	Decision	5	3:00
1985-06-25	Win	(Thailand) Samernoi Tor Boonlert	Petchyindee, Lumpinee Stadium	Bangkok, Thailand	Decision	5	3:00
Wins 200,000 baht side-bet.
1985-03-20	Win	(Thailand) Supernoi Sitchokchai		Nakhon Si Thammarat, Thailand	Decision	5	3:00
1984-10-08	Loss	(Thailand) Dennuea Denmolee	Huamark Stadium	Thailand	Decision	5	3:00
1984-09-06	Loss	(Thailand) Ngoen Sor.Ploenchit	Lumpinee Stadium	Bangkok, Thailand	Decision	5	3:00
1984-05-18	Win	(Thailand) Chutong Silapakorn	Lumpinee Stadium	Bangkok, Thailand	Decision	5	3:00
Wins the Thailand title.
1984-03-20	Win	(Thailand) Joknoy Nor Nongkaa	Lumpinee Stadium	Bangkok, Thailand	Decision	5	3:00
1983-11-21	Win	(Thailand) Warunee Sor Ploenchit	Rajadamnern Stadium	Bangkok, Thailand	Decision	5	3:00
1983-08-22	Win	(Thailand) Sittichai Monsongkram	Rajadamnern Stadium	Bangkok, Thailand	Decision	5	3:00
1983-05-23	Win	(Thailand) Warunee Sor Ploenchit	Rajadamnern Stadium	Bangkok, Thailand	Decision	5	3:00
Wins the Thailand title.
1983-05-	Win	(Thailand) Jingjokthong Lukphayamengrai		Chiang Mai, Thailand	Decision	5	3:00
1983-04-07	Win	(Thailand) Airang Sitsaphan	Rajadamnern Stadium	Bangkok, Thailand	Decision	5	3:00
Legend: Win Loss Draw/No contest Notes
