= Damrong Puttan =

Thai television host, radio presenter and publisher of bi-weekly magazine and senator

Dumrong Poottan 1st Class KGCT MT
- ดำรง พุฒตาล
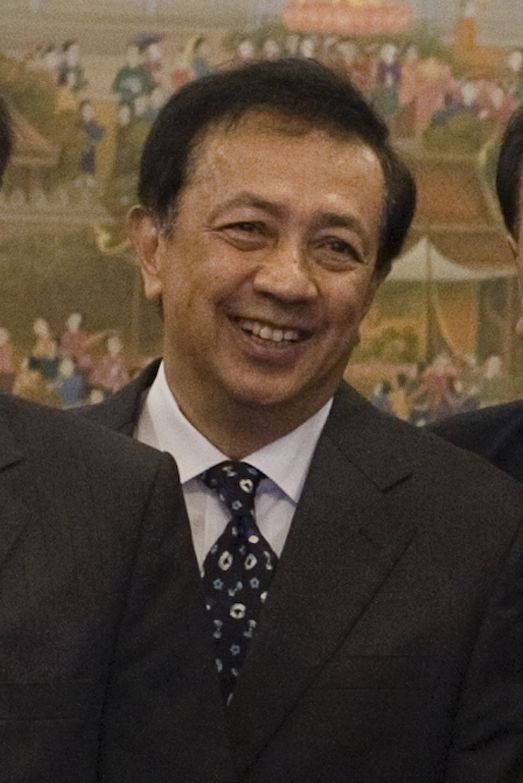
- Dumrong Poottan in 2010
- Born: May 31, 1944 (age 82); Phra Nakhon Si Ayutthaya, Phra Nakhon Si Ayutthaya, Thailand
- Other name: Loh
- Education: Bansomdejchaopraya Teachers College; (now Bansomdejchaopraya Rajabhat University) (BRSU); Srinakharinwirot University (SWU)
- Occupations: Television host; radio presenter; publisher; travel agency owner; politician
- Years active: 1967 – present
- Notable work: Koosang-Koosom; Johjai
- Spouse: Kanda Poottan
- Children: 4, including Pichet Poottan, Tanden Poottan, Praota Poottan and Tawiwut Poottan

Dumrong Poottan (Thai: ดำรง พุฒตาล; born May 31, 1944, in Phra Nakhon Si Ayutthaya) is a Thai television host, radio presenter, a publisher of a bi-weekly magazine, and a member of the Senate of Thailand.

Dumrong is known as the host of several television programs over the decades.

== Early life ==
Born and raised in a Muslim family in Ayutthaya. His ancestors migrated from Persia to Ayutthaya during the reign of King Ekathotsarot, about 400 years ago. His great-grandfather was the owner of about 300 rai (48 ha; 120 acres) of land in Wang Noi district in the south of Ayutthaya province. As a child, he enjoyed swimming in the rivers of his hometown, including Chao Phraya, Pa Sak and Lop Buri. Also he enjoyed talking to western tourists visiting Ayutthaya in order to practice English by himself.

== Careers ==
Dumrong is considered one of the pioneering television presenters in Thailand, having started in 1967. He is known for being an MC with the late Thammarat Naksuriya. Prior to that, he worked as a catering department supervisor for Thai Airways Company (now Thai Airways International).

He is also the owner and editor of Koosang-Koosom (คู่สร้างคู่สม, Perfect Couple), a bi-weekly magazine featuring topics such as family life, unrequited love story and overseas tourism. The magazine was once the highest-selling magazine in the country. The first issue was released in 1980 and ceased publication in 2017, a total of 38 years and 1,005 issues.

He is also known for hosting a program Johjai (เจาะใจ, "straight to the heart"), a variety talk show on Channel 5 every Thursday evening with Sanya Kunakorn from 1991 until 1999.

He was elected as Bangkok senator from the first senate election in Thailand in 2000 according to the provisions of the 1997 constitution.

== Personal life ==
He lives at a private residence called "Wiang Lek" (เวียงเหล็ก—alluding to the place where Ayutthaya was first established by King U Thong in 1351) in the city of Ayutthaya by the Chao Phraya river opposite Wat Phutthaisawan, close to his birthplace.
