= Daorung Chuvatana =

Thai boxer

Daorung Chuvatana (Thai: ดาวรุ่ง ชูวัฒนะ) whose real name is Surapol Sidangnoi (สุรพล สีแดงน้อย) (born 1969-04-01 in Nam Pat District, Uttaradit Province, Thailand) is a retired boxer who won World titles in the Bantamweight weight divisions.

Chuvatana turned pro in 1985 and in 1994 won the WBA bantamweight title by winning a decision over John Michael Johnson by controversial TKO. Near the end of the first round, Chuvatana unintentionally headbutted Johnson, causing him to sustain a cut above his right eye, however, the referee ruled that it was caused by a punch and Chuvatana was declared the winner after the ringside doctor inspected the cut and called the fight off. He lost the belt in his third defense to Veeraphol Sahaprom in 1995. He later regained the WBA bantamweight belt with a win over Nana Konadu by decision after the fight was stopped in the 10th round. He defended the title once before losing it to Konadu in a rematch the following year.

After retirement, he served as a noncommissioned airman at the Supreme Command Headquarters, working as a driver and mechanic. He attained the highest rank of Fight Sergeant 1st Class, and later resigned to take up a position as an official at Uttaradit Municipality in his hometown.

== Other names ==
- Daorung MP Petroleum
- Daorung Chor Siriwat

Achievements
Preceded by John Michael Johnson	WBA Bantamweight Champion; 16 Jul 1994 – 17 Sep 1995	Succeeded by Veeraphol Sahaprom
Preceded by Nana Konadu	WBA Bantamweight Champion; 27 Oct 1996 – 21 Jun 1997	Succeeded by Nana Konadu
