= Yodpetch Sor.Jitpattana =

Thai former professional Muay Thai fighter

- Born: Saichon Somnet (สายชล สมเนตร); August 29, 1967 (age 59); Na Ngua, Mueang Phetchabun, Phetchabun, Thailand
- Native name: กันธพัชร์ พิพัฒน์พูลเดชา
- Other names: Saichon Lukklongsan (สายชล ลูกคลองสาน); Yodpetch Lookrangsee (ยอดเพชร ลูกรังสี); Yodpetch Petchyindee (ยอดเพชร เพชรยินดี)
- Nickname: Master of Trickery (จอมเจ้าเล่ห์)
- Division: Super Flyweight; Bantamweight; Featherweight
- Style: Muay Thai (Muay Femur)
- Stance: Orthodox
- Team: Lukrangsri; Sor.Jitpattana; Petchyindee
- Years active: c. 1980s–1991

Other information
- Occupation: Muay Thai trainer
- Notable relatives: Sanphet Lukrangsi (older brother)

Kanthapat Pipatpunlertcha (Thai: กันธพัชร์ พิพัฒน์พูลเดชา; born August 29, 1967), known professionally as Yodpetch Sor.Jitpattana (Thai: ยอดเพชร ส.จิตรพัฒนา), is a Thai former professional Muay Thai fighter. He is a former Lumpinee Stadium Bantamweight Champion who was active during the 1980s and 1990s.

== Biography and career ==
Saichon Somnet, who would later change his name to Kanthapat Pipatpunlertcha, was born in the village of Na Ngua in Mueang Phetchabun, Phetchabun, Thailand on August 29, 1967. He began training in Muay Thai at 7 years old under the guidance of his uncle.

He fought during the Golden Era of Muay Thai against many notable fighters including Karuhat Sor.Supawan, Wangchannoi Sor.Palangchai, Jaroenthong Kiatbanchong, Langsuan Panyuthaphum, Jampatong Na Nontachai, Dokmaipa Por Pongsawang, Kangwannoi Or.Sribualoi, and Grandprixnoi Muangchaiyaphum.

Out of desperation to pay off debts to borrowers caused by his gambling addiction, he’d attempt to rig his fight with Kraikangwan but would be boo’d by the crowd early on and dismissed by the ref in the fourth round. He was forced to retire and continued to gamble, drink, and do drugs. He’d support himself and his family through odd jobs, including hired assault and robbery. Due to a disagreement with a borrower, he’d attempt to rob his house with two other men but was arrested and sentenced to fourteen years in prison.

He’d spend two years at Ratchaburi Central Prison before being moved to Ayutthaya Central Prison where he’d spend another four years and six months before being released in 1999. He’d return to work at the Petchyindee gym but run into an old friend on his first day who gave him drugs to sell. He’d use and sell drugs again for a year before finding a new source for party drugs which he’d sell at night in Ratchada. After being caught in a sting operation, he imprisoned for drug possession with intent to sell. His boxing experience would earn him a spot at Klong Prem Central Prison where he’d become the head trainer as well as an assistant prison office.

After seven years and six months in prison, he was released and began selling meth until he was caught again in a sting operation eight months later. He was sentenced to twenty-eight years and nine months in prison in 2011. He'd spend his sentence at Klong Prem Central Prison working as a trainer, as well as fighting against Karuhat in a vintage match, before tighter restrictions closed down his gym. He'd join the largest gang in his prison as an enforcer. He would be released early in 2021 after serving ten years and two months in prison. He'd begin to teach Muay Thai at the Nakhon Phanom Sports School and nowadays works as a trainer at the YOKKAO Training Center.

== Titles and accomplishments ==
- Lumpinee Stadium
  - 1987 Lumpinee Stadium Bantamweight (118 lbs) Champion

== Fight record ==
Muay Thai Record (Incomplete)
Date	Result	Opponent	Event	Location	Method	Round	Time
1991-08-23	Loss	(Thailand) Kraikangwan Or.Sribualoi	Lumpinee Stadium	Bangkok, Thailand	DQ (dismissed by ref)	4	
1991-07-09	Loss	(Thailand) Kraikangwan Or.Sribualoi	Lumpinee Stadium	Bangkok, Thailand	Decision	5	3:00
1991-06-25	Loss	(Thailand) Kuekrit Sor.Nayaiam	Lumpinee Stadium	Bangkok, Thailand	Decision	5	3:00
1991-05-03	Loss	(Thailand) Kangwannoi Or.Sribualoi	Lumpinee Stadium	Bangkok, Thailand	Decision	5	3:00
1991-03-19	Win	(Thailand) Kangwannoi Or.Sribualoi	Lumpinee Stadium	Bangkok, Thailand	Decision	5	3:00
1991-02-21	Win	(Thailand) Chanalert Muanghatyai	Rajadamnern Stadium	Bangkok, Thailand	Decision	5	3:00
1991-01-18	Win	(Thailand) Nuengsiam Kiatwichian	Lumpinee Stadium	Bangkok, Thailand	Decision	5	3:00
1990-12-21	Loss	(Thailand) Decha SitBanchong	Lumpinee Stadium	Bangkok, Thailand	Decision	5	3:00
1990-12-	Win	(Thailand) Kongklai Muangchaiyaphum		Hong Kong	Decision	5	3:00
1990-11-23	Win	(Thailand) Kuekrit Sor.Nayaiam		Thailand	Decision	5	3:00
1990-10-19	Win	(Thailand) Kangwannoi Or.Sribualoi		Thailand	Decision	5	3:00
1990-09-07	Win	(Thailand) Kuekrit Sor.Nayaiam	Lumpinee Stadium	Bangkok, Thailand	Decision	5	3:00
1990-07-19	Draw	(Thailand) Kuekrit Sor.Nayaiam	Rajadamnern Stadium	Bangkok, Thailand	Decision	5	3:00
1990-06-15	Win	(Thailand) Kongfah Luktapfah	Lumpinee Stadium	Bangkok, Thailand	Decision	5	3:00
1990-05-11	Loss	(Thailand) Kangwannoi Or.Sribualoi	Lumpinee Stadium	Bangkok, Thailand	Decision	5	3:00
For the Lumpinee Stadium Bantamweight (118 lbs) title.
1990-04-17	Win	(Thailand) Noppadet Narumon	Lumpinee Stadium	Bangkok, Thailand	KO (Punches)	3	
1990-03-02	Loss	(Thailand) Wangchannoi Sor.Palangchai	Lumpinee Stadium	Bangkok, Thailand	Decision	5	3:00
1990-01-23	Win	(Thailand) Kaonar Sor.Kettalingchan	Lumpinee Stadium	Bangkok, Thailand	Decision	5	3:00
1989-12-26	Win	(Thailand) Panomrung Suntarakiet	Lumpinee Stadium	Bangkok, Thailand	KO	3	
1989-12-08	Win	(Thailand) Panomrung Suntarakiet	Lumpinee Stadium	Bangkok, Thailand	Decision	5	3:00
1989-10-05	Loss	(Thailand) Toiting Kiatpetchnoi	Rajadamnern Stadium	Bangkok, Thailand	Decision	5	3:00
1989-09-01	Loss	(Thailand) Kangwannoi Or.Sribualoi	Lumpinee Stadium	Bangkok, Thailand	Decision	5	3:00
1989-08-09	Win	(Thailand) Teeyai Piyapan	Lumpinee Stadium	Thailand	KO	4	
1989-06-30	Loss	(Thailand) Kangwannoi Or.Sribualoi	Lumpinee Stadium	Bangkok, Thailand	Decision	5	3:00
1989-06-06	Loss	(Thailand) Dokmaipa Por.Pongsawang	Lumpinee Stadium	Bangkok, Thailand	Decision	5	3:00
1989-04-21	Loss	(Thailand) Karuhat Sor.Supawan	Lumpinee Stadium	Bangkok, Thailand	Decision	5	3:00
1989-03-24	Win	(Thailand) Thongsabud Piyapan		Thailand	Decision	5	3:00
1988-06-03	Win	(Thailand) Boonmee Sitsuchon	Lumpinee Stadium	Bangkok, Thailand	Decision	5	3:00
1988-05-17	Win	(Thailand) Jaroenthong Kiatbanchong	Lumpinee Stadium	Bangkok, Thailand	Decision	5	3:00
1988-05-03	Win	(Thailand) Bunmee Sit Suchon		Thailand	Decision	5	3:00
1988-04-26	Loss	(Thailand) Grandprixnoi Muangchaiyaphum	Lumpinee Stadium	Bangkok, Thailand	Decision	5	3:00
Loses the Lumpinee Stadium Bantamweight (118 lbs) title.
1988-01-22	Loss	(Thailand) Langsuan Panyuthaphum	Lumpinee Stadium	Bangkok, Thailand	Decision	5	3:00
1987-11-17	Win	(Thailand) Mono Singkaosaen	Lumpinee Stadium	Bangkok, Thailand	TKO (Punches)	5	
1987-08-25	Win	(Thailand) Jampatong Na Nontachai	Lumpinee Stadium	Bangkok, Thailand	KO	1	0:17
Wins the Lumpinee Stadium Bantamweight (118 lbs) title.
1987-07-25	Win	(Thailand) Prathanporn Sit Por Phrommes	Samrong Stadium	Samut Prakan, Thailand	KO	2	
1987-06-29	Win	(Thailand) Phayakdam Yutthakit	Rajadamnern Stadium	Bangkok, Thailand	Decision	5	3:00
1987-05-29	Win	(Thailand) Wanpichit Kaennorasing	Rajadamnern Stadium	Bangkok, Thailand	Decision	5	3:00
1987-04-17	Win	(Thailand) Jaroenthong Kiatbanchong	Lumpinee Stadium	Bangkok, Thailand	Decision	5	3:00
1987-03-02	Win	(Thailand) Phodam Chuwattana	Rajadamnern Stadium	Bangkok, Thailand	Decision	5	3:00
1987-01-21	Win	(Thailand) Mono Singkaosaen	Rajadamnern Stadium	Bangkok, Thailand	Decision	5	3:00
1986-12-09	Loss	(Thailand) Saengchai Praianan		Thailand	Decision	5	3:00
1986-11-11	Win	(Thailand) Eddie Sit Wat Siriphong		Thailand	Decision	5	3:00
1986-10-28	Win	(Thailand) Saengchai Praianan		Thailand	Decision	5	3:00
1986-09-23	Win	(Thailand) Boonmee Sitsuchon		Thailand	KO	5	
1986-08-12	Win	(Thailand) Burengnong Silpakorn		Thailand	Decision	5	3:00
1986-06-10	Loss	(Thailand) Waifai Praphatmotor		Thailand	Decision	5	3:00
1986-05-16	Won	(Thailand) Starboy Lukbangbon		Thailand	Decision	5	3:00
1986-04-22	Loss	(Thailand) Saengchai Praianan		Thailand	Decision	5	3:00
1986-03-25	Won	(Thailand) Eddie Sit Wat Siriphong		Thailand	Decision	5	3:00
1985-08-20	Draw	(Thailand) Burenong Silpakorn		Thailand	Decision	5	3:00
1985-06-25	Loss	(Thailand) Daotrang Tor.Boonlert		Thailand	KO	1	
1985-05-26	Won	(Thailand) Maphaimueang Buriram		Thailand	Decision	5	3:00
1985-05-14	Loss	(Thailand) Grandprixnoi Mueangchaiyaphum		Thailand	Decision	5	3:00
1985-04-27	Won	(Thailand) Burenong Silpakorn		Thailand	Decision	5	3:00
1985-04-05	Won	(Thailand) Lukkrok Kiaturai		Thailand	Decision	5	3:00
1985-03-01	Win	(Thailand) Sisot Sor.Ritthichai		Thailand	DQ	5	
1985-02-	Loss	(Thailand) Chanalert Mueanghatyai		Thailand	Decision	5	3:00
1984-06-12	Loss	(Thailand) Phikhatsuek Sor.Saengthai		Thailand	Decision	5	3:00
1984-04-17	Loss	(Thailand) Wiratchanoi Kiattratpol		Thailand	Decision	5	3:00
1984-01-27	Won	(Thailand) Sekson Sitjomthong		Thailand	Decision	5	3:00
1983-12-13	Won	(Thailand) Songsak Sitprasert		Thailand	Decision	5	3:00
1983-11-26	Won	(Thailand) Wichanlek PhithakPor.Kor.	Lumpinee Stadium	Bangkok, Thailand	Decision	5	3:00
1983-07-06	Won	(Thailand) Airang Sor.Saengthai	Rajadamnern Stadium	Bangkok, Thailand	Decision	5	3:00
Legend: Win Loss Draw/No contest Notes
