= Kongnapa Watcharawit =

Thai former professional Muay Thai fighter

- Born: Noppadol Lumpa; 2 March 1968 (age 58); Suwannaphum, Roi Et, Thailand
- Native name: นภดล ลำภา
- Other names: Kongnapa Lukthapfa (ก้องนภา ลูกทัพฟ้า); Kongnapa BM Service (ก้องนภา บี.เอ็ม.เซอร์วิส)
- Nickname: The Exocet (ดิเอ๊กไซเซ่)
- Height: 174 cm (5 ft 9 in)
- Division: Super Bantamweight; Featherweight; Super Featherweight; Super Lightweight; Super Welterweight
- Style: Muay Thai (Muay Mat)
- Stance: Southpaw
- Team: Kietpetchnoi Gym; Lukthapfa Gym
- Years active: c. 1983–2008

Other information
- Occupation: Muay Thai trainer

Noppadol Lumpa (Thai: นภดล ลำภา; born March 2, 1968), known professionally as Kongnapa Watcharawit (Thai: ก้องนภา วัชรวิทย์), is a Thai former professional Muay Thai fighter and amateur boxer. He is a former four-division Rajadamnern Stadium champion. He earned a silver medal at the 1991 SEA Games boxing event.

== Biography and career ==
Kongnapa started to train in Muay Thai at the age of 15 in a local camp of his native province. After 8 months of training he moved to the Kietpetchnoi gym in Bangkok. Known for his powerful hands, Kongnapa captured the Rajadamnern Stadium belt in four divisions between 1988 and 1995.

In the late 1990s Kongnapa moved to the United States where he became a trainer at Roufusport in Milwaukee, Wisconsin and kept competing on the local scene.

On December 4, 1998, Kongnapa faced Donnie Pendleton for the IKF Pro Muaythai World title. He won the fight by knockout with low kicks in the first round.

On November 19, 1999, Kongnapa defeated Steve Milles by knockout in a WKA event in New York.

On February 26, 2000, Kongnapa defended his IKF PRo Muay Thai World title against Dmitry Shakuta from Belarus. He won a highly contested fight by majority decision.

On November 10, 2000, Kongnapa regained the IKF Muay Thai World title he had involuntarily vacated when he defeated Pedro Villalobos by TKO in the second round.

On January 12, 2008 Kongnapa faced En Kang as a defense of his IKKC Muay Thai Intercontinental title at a WCK Muay Thai event. He lost the fight by doctor stoppage due to cuts in the fourth round.

Kongnapa is a trainer in the United States, when he resided in Las Vegas he trained former boxing world champion Riddick Bowe for his Muay Thai debut in 2013. Kongnapa later joined Coban's gym in New York and lives in Portland, Oregon as of 2022.

== Titles and honours ==
- Rajadamnern Stadium
  - 1988 Rajadamnern Stadium Super Bantamweight (122 lbs) Champion
  - 1989 Rajadamnern Stadium Featherweight (126 lbs) Champion
    - One successful title defense
  - 1991 Rajadamnern Stadium Super Featherweight (130 lbs) Champion
  - 1995 Rajadamnern Stadium Super Lightweight (140 lbs) Champion
- International Kickboxing Federation
  - 1998 I.K.F. Pro Muaythai Junior-middleweight World Champion
    - Five successful title defenses
- International Muay Thai Championship
  - 2001 I.M.T.C. Muay Thai Super Welterweight World −70 kg Champion
- International Karate Kickboxing Council
  - 2007 IKKC Muay Thai Intercontinental Jr. Middleweight Champion

== Fight record ==
Muay Thai Record
125 Wins (51 (T)KOs, 32 Losses, 6 Draws
Date	Result	Opponent	Event	Location	Method	Round	Time
2008-07-19	Win	(United States) Hector Pena	WCK Muay Thai	Temecula, California, US	Decision (Split)	5	3:00
Wins the I.M.T.C. Muay Thai Super Welterweight World title −70 kg.
2008-01-12	Loss	(China) En Kang	WCK Muay Thai	Las Vegas, Nevada, US	TKO (Doctor stoppage/Cuts)	4	
Loses the IKKC Muay Thai Intercontinental Jr. Middleweight title.
2007-11-29	Win	(United States) Toby Grear	WCK Muay Thai	Highland, California, US	Decision (Unanimous)	5	3:00
Wins the IKKC Muay Thai Intercontinental Jr. Middleweight title.
2002-10-11	Win	(United States) Jason Fenton		Atlanta, Georgia, US	KO (Low kicks)	3	
2001-06-03	Win	(Denmark) Ole Laursen	Warriors Cup 3	Burbank, California, USA	Decision (Split)	5	3:00
Wins the I.M.T.C. Muay Thai Super Welterweight World title −70 kg.
2000-11-10	Win	(Mexico) Pedro Villalobos	IKF: Muay Thai Uprising 1	Atlanta, Georgia, US	TKO (Kicks + punches)	2	1:54
Wins the vacant I.K.F. Pro Muaythai Junior-middleweight World title.
2000-03-17	Win	(France) Pascal Lafleur	ISKA: Wilson vs. Cooper	Las Vegas, Nevada, US	KO (Right hook)	1	2:40
2000-02-26	Win	(Belarus) Dmitry Shakuta	Roufusport	Milwaukee, Wisconsin, US	Decision (Majority)	5	3:00
Defends the I.K.F. Pro Muaythai Junior-middleweight World title.
1999-11-19	Win	(United States) Steve Milles	WKA	New York, USA	TKO (Doctor stoppage)	3	
1999-09-18	Win	(Belarus) Vadim Chamykin	Roufusport	Milwaukee, Wisconsin, US	KO	2	1:53
Defends the I.K.F. Pro Muaythai Junior-middleweight World title.
1999-05-01	Win	(United States) Jeremy Abbott	Roufusport	Milwaukee, Wisconsin, US	TKO (Elbows + knees)	2	2:44
1999-03-19	Win	(Australia) Marcus Mangan	Roufusport	Milwaukee, Wisconsin, US	Decision (Unanimous)	5	3:00
Defends the I.K.F. Pro Muaythai Junior-middleweight World title.
1999-02-06	Win	(England) Eval Denton	Roufusport	Milwaukee, Wisconsin, US	Decision (Unanimous)	5	3:00
Defends the I.K.F. Pro Muaythai Junior-middleweight World title.
1998-12-04	Win	(United States) Donnie Pendleton	Roufusport	Milwaukee, Wisconsin, US	KO (Low kick)	1	
Wins the I.K.F. Pro Muaythai Junior-middleweight World title.
1998-10-24	Win	(Canada) Ryan Jones	Roufusport	Milwaukee, Wisconsin, US	KO (Punch)	1	
1998-07-03	Win	(United States) Brian Lee	Las Vegas Fight Night 1998	Las Vegas, Nevada, US	KO		
1998-05-30	Loss	(Thailand) Khunpon Dechkampu	Roufusport	Milwaukee, Wisconsin, US	KO (Elbow)	3	1:21
?	Loss	(Thailand) Den Muangsurin	Lumpinee Stadium	Bangkok, Thailand	KO (Uppercut)	4	
1995-06-30	Loss	(Thailand) Sangtiennoi Sor.Rungroj	Lumpinee Stadium	Bangkok, Thailand	Decision	5	3:00
1995-06-07	Loss	(Thailand) Pairot Wor.Wolapon	Rajadamnern Stadium	Bangkok, Thailand	Decision	5	3:00
1995-04-28	Win	(Thailand) Namkabuan Nongkeepahuyuth	Lumpinee Stadium	Bangkok, Thailand	Decision	5	3:00
1995-03-29	Win	(Thailand) Namphon Nongkeepahuyuth	Rajadamnern Stadium	Bangkok, Thailand	KO (High kick)	5	
1995-03-02	Loss	(Thailand) Saenkeng Pinsinchai	Rajadamnern Stadium	Bangkok, Thailand	Decision	5	3:00
Loses the Rajadamnern Stadium Super Lightweight (140 lbs) title.
1995-01-11	Win	(Thailand) Saenkeng Pinsinchai	Rajadamnern Stadium	Bangkok, Thailand	Decision (Unanimous)	5	3:00
Wins the vacant Rajadamnern Stadium Super Lightweight (140 lbs) title.
1994-09-06	Loss	(Thailand) M16 Bor.Khor.Sor	Lumpinee Stadium	Bangkok, Thailand	Decision	5	3:00
1994-06-01	Win	(Thailand) M16 Bor.Khor.Sor	Rajadamnern Stadium	Bangkok, Thailand	Decision	5	3:00
1994-05-03	Win	(Thailand) Chaksing Por.Rewadee	Rajadamnern Stadium	Bangkok, Thailand	Decision	5	3:00
1994-03-29	Win	(Thailand) Namphon Nongkeepahuyuth	Lumpinee Stadium	Bangkok, Thailand	Decision	5	3:00
1994-03-08	Win	(Thailand) Petchrung Sityasothon	Lumpinee Stadium	Bangkok, Thailand	KO (Punch)	2	
1994-02-09	Win	(Thailand) Chanchai Sor Tamarangsri	Rajadamnern Stadium	Bangkok, Thailand	Decision	5	3:00
1994-01-11	Loss	(Thailand) Pepsi Biyapan	Lumpinee Stadium	Bangkok, Thailand	Decision	5	3:00
1993-12-21	Win	(Thailand) Suwitlek Sor.Sakowarat	Lumpinee Stadium	Bangkok, Thailand	Decision	5	3:00
1993-11-19	Win	(Thailand) Rungrit Or.Samit	Lumpinee Stadium	Bangkok, Thailand	Decision	5	3:00
1993-10-20	Loss	(Thailand) Pepsi Biyapan	Rajadamnern Stadium	Bangkok, Thailand	Decision	5	3:00
1993-09-13	Win	(Thailand) Anangdet Por.Paoin	Rajadamnern Stadium	Bangkok, Thailand	Decision	5	3:00
1993-06-26	Loss	(Thailand) Taweechai Wor.Preecha	Rajadamnern Stadium	Bangkok, Thailand	Decision	5	3:00
?	Win	(Thailand) Rungrit Or.Samit	Lumpinee Stadium	Bangkok, Thailand	KO (High kick)	3	
1992-01-15	Loss	(Thailand) Samsuek Chuwattana	Rajadamnern Stadium	Bangkok, Thailand	Decision	5	3:00
1991-08-15	Loss	(Thailand) Jongrak Lukprabaht	Rajadamnern Stadium	Bangkok, Thailand	Decision	5	3:00
For the Rajadamnern Stadium Super Featherweight (130 lbs) title.
1991-06-10	Loss	(Thailand) Jongrak Lukprabaht	Rajadamnern Stadium	Bangkok, Thailand	Decision	5	3:00
Loses the Rajadamnern Stadium Super Featherweight (130 lbs) title.
1991-05-13	Win	(Thailand) Jack Kiatniwat	Rajadamnern Stadium	Bangkok, Thailand	Decision	5	3:00
1991-04-07	Win	(Thailand) Taweechai Wor.Preecha	Rajadamnern Stadium	Bangkok, Thailand	KO (Left cross)	2	
1991-02-04	Win	(Thailand) Prasongphet Sor Thammarangsi	Rajadamnern Stadium	Bangkok, Thailand	Decision (Unanimous)	5	3:00
Wins the Rajadamnern Stadium Super Featherweight (130 lbs) title.
1990-11-23	Loss	(Thailand) Decha Sitabanchong	Lumpinee Stadium	Bangkok, Thailand	Decision	5	3:00
1990-08-15	Win	(Thailand) Namphon Nongkeepahuyuth	Rajadamnern Stadium	Bangkok, Thailand	KO	1	
1990-07-05	Draw	(Thailand) Taweechai Wor.Preecha	Rajadamnern Stadium	Bangkok, Thailand	Decision	5	3:00
1990-06-07	Loss	(Thailand) Jack Kiatniwat	Rajadamnern Stadium	Bangkok, Thailand	Decision	5	3:00
1990-05-02	Win	(Thailand) Prasongphet Sor Thammarangsi	Rajadamnern Stadium	Bangkok, Thailand	Decision	5	3:00
1990-04-05	Loss	(Thailand) Taweechai Wor.Preecha	Rajadamnern Stadium	Bangkok, Thailand	Decision	5	3:00
1990-02-01	Loss	(Thailand) Sangtiennoi Sor.Rungroj	Rajadamnern Stadium	Bangkok, Thailand	TKO	3	
1989-12-21	Win	(Thailand) Chokdee Kiatphayathai	Rajadamnern Stadium	Bangkok, Thailand	Decision	5	3:00
1989-11-13	Loss	(Thailand) Jack Kiatniwat	Rajadamnern Stadium	Bangkok, Thailand	Decision (Unanimous)	5	3:00
Loses the Rajadamnern Stadium Featherweight (126 lbs) title.
1989-03-20	Win	(Thailand) Jomwo Chernyim	Rajadamnern Stadium	Bangkok, Thailand	Decision (Unanimous)	5	3:00
Defends the Rajadamnern Stadium Featherweight (126 lbs) title.
1989-02-22	Loss	(Thailand) Sangtiennoi Sor.Rungroj	Rajadamnern Stadium	Bangkok, Thailand	Decision	5	3:00
1989-01-15	Win	(Thailand) Panomtuanlek Hapalang	Crocodile Farm	Samut Prakan, Thailand	KO (Punches)	2	
Wins the vacant Rajadamnern Stadium Featherweight (126 lbs) title.
1988-10-19	Loss	(Thailand) Sangtiennoi Sor.Rungroj	Rajadamnern Stadium	Bangkok, Thailand	Decision	5	3:00
1988-08-29	Win	(Thailand) Sombat Sor.Thanikul	Rajadamnern Stadium	Bangkok, Thailand	KO (Punch)	4	
1988-08-04	Draw	(Thailand) Sombat Sor.Thanikul		Thailand	Decision	5	3:00
1988-06-23	Win	(Thailand) Poolsawat Sitsornthong	Rajadamnern Stadium	Bangkok, Thailand	Decision	5	3:00
1988-05-09	Win	(Thailand) Wanpichit Kaennorasing	Huamark Stadium	Bangkok, Thailand	Decision	5	3:00
1988-03-24	Win	(Thailand) Dangnoi Lukprabat	Rajadamnern Stadium	Bangkok, Thailand	KO	3	
Wins the Rajadamnern Stadium Super Bantamweight (122 lbs) title.
1988-02-08	Win	(Thailand) Kwanthong Kilenthong	Rajadamnern Stadium	Bangkok, Thailand	KO	4	
1987-09-05	Win	(Thailand) Lankrung Kiatkriangkrai	WBC - Sot Chitalada vs Rae Ki Ahn, Huamark Stadium	Bangkok, Thailand	Decision	5	3:00
1987-07-23	Loss	(Thailand) Jampatong Na Nontachai	Rajadamnern Stadium	Bangkok, Thailand	Decision	5	3:00
1987-05-20	Win	(Thailand) Grandprixnoi Muangchaiyaphum	Rajadamnern Stadium	Bangkok, Thailand	Decision	5	3:00
1987-04-22	Win	(Thailand) Lankrung Kiatkriangkrai	Rajadamnern Stadium	Bangkok, Thailand	Decision	5	3:00
1987-03-12	Win	(Thailand) Kwangthong Singchawkeun	Rajadamnern Stadium	Bangkok, Thailand	KO (Left hook)	3	
1987-02-	Loss	(Thailand) Ruengchai Thairungruang	Rajadamnern Stadium	Bangkok, Thailand	Decision	5	3:00
1987-01-16	Loss	(Thailand) Wanpichit Kaennorasing	Lumpinee Stadium	Bangkok, Thailand	Decision	5	3:00
1986-08-20	Win	(Thailand) Saifa Por.Surasak	Rajadamnern Stadium	Bangkok, Thailand	KO	3	
1986-07-16	Win	(Thailand) Phlaynoi Ekamorn	Kongbid 53 Stadium	Prachuap Khiri Khan, Thailand	Decision	5	3:00
1986-06-22	Win	(Thailand) Kwangthong Singkhaokhuen	Rajadamnern Stadium	Bangkok, Thailand	Decision	5	3:00
1986-05-18	Win	(Thailand) Mangkondam Sitchang	Rajadamnern Stadium	Bangkok, Thailand	Decision	5	3:00
1986-04-18	Draw	(Thailand) Decho Wor.Sunthornnon	Lumpinee Stadium	Bangkok, Thailand	Decision	5	3:00
1986-03-25	Win	(Thailand) Aijieb Luk Por.Por	Lumpinee Stadium	Bangkok, Thailand	Decision	5	3:00
1986-02-15	Win	(Thailand) Nakbin Payontkarnchang	Lumpinee Stadium	Bangkok, Thailand	KO	2	
1986-01-09	Loss	(Thailand) Kwangthong Singkhaokhuen	Rajadamnern Stadium	Bangkok, Thailand	KO	3	
1985-11-17	Win	(Thailand) Chatngern Kiatsakda	Rajadamnern Stadium	Bangkok, Thailand	Decision	5	3:00
1985-10-	Win	(Thailand) Naksueb Pinsinchai	Rangsit Stadium	Rangsit, Thailand	Decision	5	3:00
1985-10-10	Win	(Thailand) Thepabut Lukphrabat	Rajadamnern Stadium	Bangkok, Thailand	KO	3	
1985-09-07	Loss	(Thailand) Sukasem Luk-arthit	Lumpinee Stadium	Bangkok, Thailand	Decision	5	3:00
1985-08-02	Win	(Thailand) Phisetlek Sakchaichit	Lumpinee Stadium	Bangkok, Thailand	Decision	5	3:00
1985-07-05	Win	(Thailand) Chalamkaw Sor.Sonklin	Lumpinee Stadium	Bangkok, Thailand	KO	3	
1985-03-27	Win	(Thailand) Ekkarach Petchsompong	Rajadamnern Stadium	Bangkok, Thailand	KO	4	
Legend: Win Loss Draw/No contest Notes
