= Langsuan Panyuthaphum =

Thai former professional Muay Thai fighter

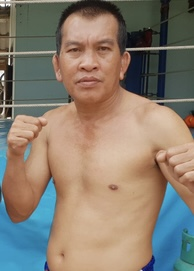
- Langsuan in 2018
- Born: Pinthong Wongpanya; February 1, 1967 (age 59); Phayao, Chaing Rai (now Phayao Province), Thailand
- Native name: ปิ่นทอง วงศ์ปัญญา
- Other names: Langsuan Taximeter (หลังสวน แท๊กซี่มิเตอร์); Pinthong Panyuthaphum; Sayannoi Sor.Jamrat (1981)
- Nickname: Mr. Merciless Knee (ขุนเข่าไร้น้ำใจ); Mr. Mean
- Height: 168 cm (5 ft 6 in)
- Division: Light Flyweight; Flyweight; Super Flyweight
- Style: Muay Thai (Muay Khao)
- Stance: Orthodox
- Team: Sasiprapa Gym
- Years active: 1981–1994

Other information
- Occupation: Muay Thai fighter (retired); Muay Thai trainer

Pinthong Wongpanya (Thai: ปิ่นทอง วงศ์ปัญญา; born February 1, 1967), known professionally as Langsuan Panyuthaphum (Thai: หลังสวน พันธ์ยุทธภูมิ), is a Thai former professional Muay Thai fighter. He is a former four-time Lumpinee Stadium champion across three divisions, as well as the 1987Sports Writers Association of Thailand Fighter of the Year, who was famous in the 1980s and 1990s. Nicknamed "Mr. Merciless Knee", he was especially known for his relentless knees and is considered amongst the greatest fighters in Muay Thai history.

== Biography and career ==
=== Early life and introduction to Muay Thai ===
Pinthong Wongpanya was born on February 1, 1967 in the village of Tom Dong located at the time in the province of Chiang Rai (now in Phayao Province) near the northern border of Laos. He started Muay Thai at 14 years old under the name of Sayannoi Sor.Jamrat with Khru Jamrat Songngai of the Sor Jamrat camp.

After winning his first 10 fights with the Sor Jamrat camp, he moved to Chiangmai to train under Khru Yuttaphum under the name of Pinthong Phanyutthapum for the Sak Boontham camp owned by Mrs. Boontham Malaitham. Finally he moved to Bangkok under the name of Langsuan Phanyutthapum at the Sasiprapa camp.

=== Competitive peak in Muay Thai ===
Langsuan fought in Bangkok for 10 years, he was known as The Merciless Knee Striker for his relentless knee attacks from the clinch.

In 1987 Langsuan had 10 fights, he won 9 times, this performance was enough to earn him the most prestigious prize in Muay Thai, the Sports Writers Association of Thailand Fighter of the Year award. That same year he won his first Lumpinee Stadium title at 108 lbs. Langsuan also won Lumpinee titles at 112 and 115 lbs in later years as well as a World title which he captured during a show in the United States. Langsuan was a notable fighter of his time and had purses going as high as 250,000 baht.

He defeated numerous stars of his era including Karuhat Sor.Supawan, Samson Isaan, Lamnamoon Sor.Sumalee, Hippy Singmanee, Wangchannoi Sor Palangchai, Veeraphol Sahaprom, Paruhatlek Sitchunthong, Dokmaipa Por Pongsawang, Jaroensap Kiatbanchong, and Mathee Jadeepitak.

On March 4, 1988, in the fight with Chamuekpet Hapalang at Lumpinee Stadium, he was in the blue corner. It turned into a no decision fight, as it was stopped midway due to the killing of Chaiwat "Ngow Haphalung" Phalungwattanakit, a gambler and sponsor of Chamuekpet. The fight was stopped shortly before the fifth round begins. The situation at that time indicated that when the five rounds were complete, he would definitely lose.

=== Decline and later years ===
After ending his career as a fighter, Langsuan became a trainer in Japan. Eventually he returned to Thailand and now teaches at the Suwannakhiri camp in Ban Mai, Phayao.

== Titles and accomplishments ==
- Lumpinee Stadium
  - 1987 Lumpinee Stadium Light Flyweight (108 lbs) Champion
  - 1989 Lumpinee Stadium Super Flyweight (115 lbs) Champion
    - One successful title defense
  - 1991 Lumpinee Stadium Flyweight (112 lbs) Champion
  - 1992 Lumpinee Stadium Super Flyweight (115 lbs) Champion
- International Muay Thai Federation
  - 1989 I.M.F World Super Flyweight (115 lbs) Champion

Awards

- 1987 Sports Writers Association of Thailand Fighter of the Year

== Fight record ==
Muay Thai Record (Incomplete)
Date	Result	Opponent	Event	Location	Method	Round	Time
1994-04-07	Loss	(Thailand) Jaroensak Kiatnakornchon	Rajadamnern Stadium	Bangkok, Thailand	Decision	5	3:00
1994-01-20	Win	Thailand Pinsinchai	Rajadamnern Stadium	Bangkok, Thailand	Decision	5	3:00
1993-11-18	Win	(Thailand) Kasemlek Kiatsiri	Rajadamnern Stadium	Bangkok, Thailand	Decision	5	3:00
1993-09-16	Loss	(Thailand) Veeraphol Sahaprom	Lumpinee Stadium	Bangkok, Thailand	KO (Left Hook)	3	
1993-07-12	Win	(Thailand) Tukatathong Por.Pongsawang	Rajadamnern Stadium	Bangkok, Thailand	Decision	5	3:00
1993-05-17	Loss	(Thailand) Duangsompong Por.Pongsawang	Rajadamnern Stadium	Bangkok, Thailand	KO	2	
1993-03-08	Loss	(Thailand) Saenkeng Pinsinchai	Rajadamnern Stadium	Bangkok, Thailand	Decision	5	3:00
1992-12-07	Win	(Thailand) Mathee Jadeepitak	Lumpinee Stadium	Bangkok, Thailand	Decision	5	3:00
1992-10-24	Win	(Thailand) Rainbow Sor.Prantalay	Lumpinee Stadium	Bangkok, Thailand	Decision	5	3:00
1992-08-07	Loss	(Thailand) Jaroensap Kiatbanchong	Lumpinee Stadium	Bangkok, Thailand	KO (Punches)	2	
Loses the Lumpinee Stadium Super Flyweight (115 lbs) title. For a 2 million baht side-bet.
1992-07-07	Win	(Thailand) Lamnamoon Sor.Sumalee	Lumpinee Stadium	Bangkok, Thailand	Decision	5	3:00
Wins the vacant Lumpinee Stadium Super Flyweight (115 lbs) title.
1992-06-09	Loss	(Thailand) Lamnamoon Sor.Sumalee	Lumpinee Stadium	Bangkok, Thailand	Decision	5	3:00
1992-05-05	Win	(Thailand) Michael Sor.Sukontip	Lumpinee Stadium	Bangkok, Thailand	Decision	5	3:00
1992-04-07	Win	(Thailand) Chartchainoi Chaorai-Oi	Lumpinee Stadium	Bangkok, Thailand	KO (Knee to the body)	3	
1992-03-06	Win	(Thailand) Saenmuangnoi Lukjaopormehasak	Lumpinee Stadium	Bangkok, Thailand	Decision	5	3:00
1992-01-31	Win	(Thailand) Pompet Naratreekul	Lumpinee Stadium	Bangkok, Thailand	Decision	5	3:00
1991-12-27	Win	(Thailand) Pompet Naratreekul	Lumpinee Stadium	Bangkok, Thailand	Decision	5	3:00
1991-11-26	Win	(Thailand) Karuhat Sor.Supawan	Lumpinee Stadium	Bangkok, Thailand	Decision	5	3:00
1991-11-05	Loss	(Thailand) Duangsompong Por.Pongsawang	Lumpinee Stadium	Bangkok, Thailand	Decision	5	3:00
1991-10-18	Win	(Thailand) Duangsompong Por.Pongsawang	Lumpinee Stadium	Bangkok, Thailand	Decision	5	3:00
1991-09-17	Loss	(Thailand) Nungubon Sitlerchai	Lumpinee Stadium	Bangkok, Thailand	KO		
1991-08-06	Loss	(Thailand) Nungubon Sitlerchai	Lumpinee Stadium	Bangkok, Thailand	KO		
Loses the Lumpinee Stadium Flyweight (112 lbs) title.
1991-07-02	Win	(Thailand) Pongsiri Por.Ruamrudee	Lumpinee Stadium	Bangkok, Thailand	KO (Knees)	4	
1991-05-31	Win	(Thailand) Jaroensap Kiatbanchong	Lumpinee Stadium	Bangkok, Thailand	Decision	5	3:00
Wins the Lumpinee Stadium Flyweight (112 lbs) title.
1991-04-30	Win	(Thailand) Jaroensap Kiatbanchong	Lumpinee Stadium	Bangkok, Thailand	Decision	5	3:00
1991-04-05	Loss	(Thailand) Oley Kiatoneway	OneSongchai, Lumpinee Stadium	Bangkok, Thailand	Decision	5	3:00
1991-03-05	Win	(Thailand) Dokmaipa Por.Pongsawang	Lumpinee Stadium	Bangkok, Thailand	Decision	5	3:00
1991-02-12	Win	(Thailand) Karuhat Sor.Supawan	Lumpinee Stadium	Bangkok, Thailand	Decision	5	3:00
1991-01-26	Win	(Thailand) Tukatathong Por.Pongsawang	Lumpinee Stadium	Bangkok, Thailand	Decision	5	3:00
1990-12-07	Win	(Thailand) Mathee Jadeepitak	Lumpinee Stadium	Bangkok, Thailand	Decision	5	3:00
1990-11-20	Loss	(Thailand) Jaroensap Kiatbanchong	Lumpinee Stadium	Bangkok, Thailand	Decision	5	3:00
1990-10-12	Win	(Thailand) Orono Por.MuangUbon	Lumpinee Stadium	Bangkok, Thailand	Decision	5	3:00
1990-08-31	Loss	(Thailand) Samranthong Choochokchai	OneSongchai, Lumpinee Stadium	Bangkok, Thailand	TKO (Ref.Stop/Punches)	4	
1990-06-26	Loss	(Thailand) Taweesaklek Ploysakda	Lumpinee Stadium	Bangkok, Thailand	Decision	5	3:00
1990-05-15	Loss	(Thailand) Wangchannoi Sor.Palangchai	Lumpinee Stadium	Bangkok, Thailand	Decision	5	3:00
1990-04-10	Win	(Thailand) Pongsiri Por.Ruamrudee	Lumpinee Stadium	Bangkok, Thailand	Decision	5	3:00
1990-03-06	Loss	(Thailand) Oley Kiatoneway	OneSongchai, Lumpinee Stadium	Bangkok, Thailand	Decision	5	3:00
1990-01-28	Win	(Netherlands) Michael Lieuwfat	Lumpinee Stadium	London, England	Decision	5	3:00
1990-01-19	Loss	(Thailand) Boonlai Sor.Thanikul	Lumpinee Stadium	Bangkok, Thailand	Decision	5	3:00
Loses the Lumpinee Stadium Super Flyweight (115 lbs) title.
1989-12-29	Win	(Thailand) Peemai Or Yuttanakorn	Lumpinee Stadium	Bangkok, Thailand	Decision	5	3:00
1989-11-27	Loss	(Thailand) Rajasak Sor.Vorapin	Rajadamnern Stadium	Bangkok, Thailand	Decision	5	3:00
Highest purse of Langsuan's career at 250,000 baht.
1989-11-02	Win	(Thailand) Rajasak Sor.Vorapin	Rajadamnern Stadium Raja champion vs Lumpinee champion	Bangkok, Thailand	Decision	5	3:00
1989-09-26	Loss	(Thailand) Kaensak Sor.Ploenjit	Lumpinee Stadium	Bangkok, Thailand	Decision	5	3:00
1989-09-05	Draw	(Thailand) Kaensak Sor.Ploenjit	Lumpinee Stadium	Bangkok, Thailand	Decision	5	3:00
Defends the Lumpinee Stadium Super Flyweight (115 lbs) title.
1989-08-08	Win	(Thailand) Detduang Por.Pongsawang	Lumpinee Stadium	Bangkok, Thailand	Decision	5	3:00
1989-06-09	Win	(Thailand) Audnoi Lukprabat	1st IMF World Championships	Anaheim, California, United States	Decision	5	3:00
Wins the inaugural IMF World Super Flyweight (115 lbs) title.
1989-05-02	Win	(Thailand) Dokmaipa Por.Pongsawang	Lumpinee Stadium	Bangkok, Thailand	Decision	5	3:00
Wins the Lumpinee Stadium Super Flyweight (115 lbs) title.
1989-03-28	Win	(Thailand) Karuhat Sor.Supawan	Lumpinee Stadium	Bangkok, Thailand	Decision	5	3:00
1989-02-21	Win	(Thailand) Paruhatlek Sitchunthong	Lumpinee Stadium	Bangkok, Thailand	Decision	5	3:00
1989-01-27	Loss	(Thailand) Noppadet Sor.Rewadee	Lumpinee Stadium	Bangkok, Thailand	Decision	5	3:00
1989-01-06	Draw	(Thailand) Karuhat Sor.Supawan	Lumpinee Stadium	Bangkok, Thailand	Decision	5	3:00
1988-12-02	Win	(Thailand) Pongsiri Por.Ruamrudee	Lumpinee Stadium	Bangkok, Thailand	Decision	5	3:00
1988-10-13	Win	(Thailand) Veeraphol Sahaprom	Rajadamnern Stadium	Bangkok, Thailand	Decision	5	3:00
1988-09-09	Loss	(Thailand) Wangchannoi Sor.Palangchai	Lumpinee Stadium	Bangkok, Thailand	KO	2	
1988-07-26	Win	(Thailand) Dokmaipa Por.Pongsawang	Lumpinee Stadium	Bangkok, Thailand	Decision	5	3:00
1988-06-10	Loss	(Thailand) Jaroenthong Kiatbanchong	Lumpinee Stadium	Bangkok, Thailand	Decision	5	3:00
1988-05-03	Loss	(Thailand) Chamuekpet Hapalang	Lumpinee Stadium	Bangkok, Thailand	Decision	5	3:00
1988-03-04	NC	(Thailand) Chamuekpet Hapalang	Lumpinee Stadium	Bangkok, Thailand	gunshots in the arena	4	3:00
1988-01-22	Win	(Thailand) Yodpetch Sor.Jitpattana	Lumpinee Stadium	Bangkok, Thailand	Decision	5	3:00
1987-12-08	Win	(Thailand) Baeber Narupai	Lumpinee Stadium	Bangkok, Thailand	Decision	5	3:00
1987-10-27	Win	(Thailand) Wangchannoi Sor.Palangchai	Lumpinee Stadium	Bangkok, Thailand	Decision	5	3:00
Wins the Muay Thai World Flyweight (112 lbs) title.
1987-09-22	Win	(Thailand) Dokmaipa Por.Pongsawang	Lumpinee Stadium	Bangkok, Thailand	Decision	5	3:00
1987-08-28	Win	(Thailand) Paruhatlek Sitchunthong	Lumpinee Stadium	Bangkok, Thailand	Decision	5	3:00
1987-07-31	Win	(Thailand) Hippy Singmanee	Lumpinee Stadium	Bangkok, Thailand	KO (Knees)	3	
1987-06-16	Loss	(Thailand) Paruhatlek Sitchunthong	Lumpinee Stadium	Bangkok, Thailand	Decision	5	3:00
1987-05-19	Win	(Thailand) Dennuea Denmolee	Lumpinee Stadium	Bangkok, Thailand	Decision	5	3:00
Wins the vacant Lumpinee Stadium Light Flyweight (108 lbs) title.
1987-03-24	Win	(Thailand) Sangwannoi Sor.Rungroj	Lumpinee Stadium	Bangkok, Thailand	Decision	5	3:00
1987-02-10	Win	(Thailand) Morakot Choiyim	Lumpinee Stadium	Bangkok, Thailand	KO	3	
1987-01-06	Win	(Thailand) Boonkerd Fairtex	Lumpinee Stadium	Bangkok, Thailand	Decision	5	3:00
1986-12-10	Win	(Thailand) Yodmanut Sityodtong		Thailand	Decision	5	3:00
1986-11-13	Win	(Thailand) Yodmanut Sityodtong	Rajadamnern Stadium	Bangkok, Thailand	Decision	5	3:00
1986-10-10	Win	(Thailand) Thongsak Fairtex	Lumpinee Stadium	Bangkok, Thailand	Decision	5	3:00
1986-09-18	Win	(Thailand) Daothongnoi Sit Daothong	Lumpinee Stadium	Bangkok, Thailand	Decision	5	3:00
1986-08-29	Win	(Thailand) Thammawit Sakdisamut	Lumpinee Stadium	Bangkok, Thailand	Decision	5	3:00
1986-07-06	Loss	(Thailand) Wanpichit Kaennorasing	Rajadamnern Stadium	Bangkok, Thailand	Decision	5	3:00
1986-06-06	Win	(Thailand) Thongsak Fairtex	Lumpinee Stadium	Bangkok, Thailand	Decision	5	3:00
1986-05-13	Win	(Thailand) Thongsak Fairtex	Lumpinee Stadium	Bangkok, Thailand	Decision	5	3:00
1986-04-01	Win	(Thailand) Phetchan Saksitwichit	Lumpinee Stadium	Bangkok, Thailand	Decision	5	3:00
1986-02-04	Loss	(Thailand) Rattana Sitrungsak	Lumpinee Stadium	Bangkok, Thailand	Decision	5	3:00
1985-12-31	Loss	(Thailand) Namphon Nongkeepahuyuth	Lumpinee Stadium	Bangkok, Thailand	Decision	5	3:00
1985-12-05	Win	(Thailand) Sitthichai Monsongkram	Lumpinee Stadium	Bangkok, Thailand	Decision	5	3:00
1985-10-11	Win	(Thailand) Khununlek Hapalang	Lumpinee Stadium	Bangkok, Thailand	KO	2	
1985-08-23	Loss	(Thailand) Sitthichai Monsongkram	Lumpinee Stadium	Bangkok, Thailand	Decision	5	3:00
1985-07-12	Loss	(Thailand) Rattana Sor.Boonyaporn	Lumpinee Stadium	Bangkok, Thailand	Decision	5	3:00
1985-06-08	Win	(Thailand) Sitthichai Monsongkram	Lumpinee Stadium	Bangkok, Thailand	KO	3	
1985-05-10	Loss	(Thailand) Wangchannoi Sor.Palangchai	Lumpinee Stadium	Bangkok, Thailand	Decision	5	3:00
1985-03-29	Win	(Thailand) Saeksan Sit Chomthong	Lumpinee Stadium	Bangkok, Thailand	Decision	5	3:00
1985-02-26	Win	(Thailand) Maewpa Suanmisakawan	Lumpinee Stadium	Bangkok, Thailand	Decision	5	3:00
1985-01-26	Win	(Thailand) Dechasak Phayaksakda	Lumpinee Stadium	Bangkok, Thailand	Decision	5	3:00
1984-12-21	Win	(Thailand) Dejritnoi Sitchaichimplee	Lumpinee Stadium	Bangkok, Thailand	Decision	5	3:00
1984-	Loss	(Thailand) Dujdao Phittaklongoen		Chiang Mai, Thailand	Decision	5	3:00
1984-	Win	(Thailand) Hokhak Hongpapmitsilp		Lamphun, Thailand	Decision	5	3:00
1984-	Win	(Thailand) Suelek Kiatmuangtai		Hat Yai, Thailand	Decision	5	3:00
1984-	Win	(Thailand) Sinchainoi Chokpreecha		Rayong, Thailand	Decision	5	3:00
1984-	Win	(Thailand) Pungluang Kiatanan	Lumpinee Stadium	Bangkok, Thailand	Decision	5	3:00
1984-	Win	(Thailand) Thaninoi Sor.Samakkhi	Lumpinee Stadium	Bangkok, Thailand	Decision	5	3:00
1984-	Win	(Thailand) Fahsathan Mantaylor		Chonburi, Thailand	Decision	5	3:00
1984-03-28	Loss	(Thailand) Aitoi Singatthaphon	Rajadamnern Stadium	Bangkok, Thailand	KO	2	
1984-02-04	Loss	(Thailand) Aitoi Singatthaphon		Bangkok, Thailand	Decision	5	3:00
1984-01-07	Loss	(Thailand) Wiratnoi Kiatrattaphol		Hat Yai, Thailand	Decision	5	3:00
1983-	Win	(Thailand) Maenoi Kiatnara		Chiang Mai, Thailand	Decision	5	3:00
1983-	Win	(Thailand) Panleknoi Sitpuchong		Phayao province, Thailand	KO	3	
1983-09-10	Win	(Thailand) Surachai Lukyomarat		Thailand	Decision	5	3:00
1983-	Win	(Thailand) M.6 Mor.Lukphithak		Phrae province, Thailand	Decision	5	3:00
1983-	Win	(Thailand) Suelek Kiatmuangtai		Thailand	Decision	5	3:00
1983-	Win	(Thailand) Danchai Sitphophrommet		Thailand	Decision	5	3:00
1983-	Win	(Thailand) Nuaphiphob Singkhiri		Thailand	Decision	5	3:00
1983-	Loss	(Thailand) Daoprakai Singthanasak		Bangkok, Thailand	Decision	5	3:00
1983-	Win	(Thailand) Mongleynoi Teknik		Bangkok, Thailand	Decision	5	3:00
1983-	Win	(Thailand) Phayanoi Saksarawut		Bangkok, Thailand	Decision	5	3:00
1983-	Win	(Thailand) Namjai Premchai		Bangkok, Thailand	Decision	5	3:00
1983-01-	Win	(Thailand) Witsanu Petdecha		Thailand	Decision	5	3:00
Legend: Win Loss Draw/No contest Notes
