= Wisanupon Saksamut =

Thai former professional Muay Thai fighter

- Born: January 11, 1963 (age 63); Bang Bo, Samut Prakan, Thailand
- Height: 170 cm (5 ft 7 in)
- Division: Pinweight; Light Flyweight; Flyweight; Super Flyweight
- Style: Muay Thai (Muay Femur)
- Stance: Southpaw
- Team: Sakhomsin

Wisanupon Saksamut (Thai: วิษณุพร ศักดิ์สมุทร) is a Thai former professional Muay Thai fighter. He is a former six-time Lumpinee Stadium champion across four divisions who was famous during the 1980s.

== Biography and career ==
Witsanupon was born in the Samut Prakan province in 1963, he started training in Muay Thai along his older brother who fought under the name Thammawit Saksamut. He competed in various provinces and on the outskirts of Bangkok before making his major stadium debut in 1979 for the Songchai promotion.

During his Bangkok career Wisanupon captured six Lumpinee Stadium belts in four different weight classes, starting at 102 lbs in 1981 against Ruengchai Thairungruang. In his last Lumpinee Stadium title fights he lost his 115 lbs belt to Dokmaipa Por Pongsawang.
Wisanupon defeated many notable champions of his era such as Paruhatlek Sitchunthong, Boonam Sor.Jarunee, Phayanoi Sor.Thasanee, Bangkhlanoi Sor.Thanikul or Jaroenthong Kiatbanchong.

After retiring he went to live in the Roi Et province.

== Championships and accomplishments ==
- Lumpinee Stadium
  - 1981 Lumpinee Stadium Pinweight (102 lbs) Champion
  - 1982 Lumpinee Stadium Light Flyweight (108 lbs) Champion
  - 1982 Lumpinee Stadium Super Flyweight (115 lbs) Champion
  - 1985 2x Lumpinee Stadium Flyweight (112 lbs) Champion
  - 1988 Lumpinee Stadium Super Flyweight (115 lbs) Champion

== Fight record ==
Muay Thai Record
Date	Result	Opponent	Event	Location	Method	Round	Time
1990-05-15	Loss	(Thailand) Samransak Muangsurin	Lumpinee Stadium	Bangkok, Thailand	Decision	5	3:00
1988-10-18	Loss	(Thailand) Phanrit Luksrirat	Samrong Stadium	Bangkok, Thailand	Decision	5	3:00
1988-07-18	Loss	(Thailand) Sanit Wichitkriengkrai	Rajadamnern Stadium	Bangkok, Thailand	Decision	5	3:00
1988-05-31	Loss	(Thailand) Dokmaipa Por Pongsawang	Lumpinee Stadium	Bangkok, Thailand	TKO (Corner stoppage)	4	
Loses the Lumpinee Stadium Super Flyweight (115 lbs) title.
1988-04-07	Win	(Thailand) Klaipathapee Majestic	Rajadamnern Stadium	Bangkok, Thailand	Decision	5	3:00
1988-01-26	Win	(Thailand) Jaroenthong Kiatbanchong	Lumpinee Stadium	Bangkok, Thailand	Decision	5	3:00
Wins the Lumpinee Stadium Super Flyweight (115 lbs) title.
1987-12-11	Win	(Thailand) Phanrit Luksrirat	Onesongchai, Lumpinee Stadium	Bangkok, Thailand	Decision	5	3:00
1987-11-04	Win	(Thailand) Phanrit Luksrirat	Chalermchai, Rajadamnern Stadium	Bangkok, Thailand	Decision	5	3:00
1987-04-07	Win	(Thailand) Klaypathapee Majestic	Chaomangkhon, Lumpinee Stadium	Bangkok, Thailand	Decision	5	3:00
1987-01-30	Loss	(Thailand) Lukkeat Muangsurin		Bangkok, Thailand	Decision	5	3:00
1986-11-29	Win	(Thailand) Phayanoi Sor.Thasanee	Lumpinee Stadium	Bangkok, Thailand	Decision	5	3:00
1986-07-18	NC	(Thailand) Odnoi Lukprabat	Lumpinee Stadium	Bangkok, Thailand	Wisanupon dismissed	4	
Stripped of the Lumpinee Stadium Flyweight (112 lbs) title.
1986-05-06	Loss	(Thailand) Phanrit Luksrirat	Chaomangkhon + Onesongchai, Lumpinee Stadium	Bangkok, Thailand	KO (High kick)	2	
1986-03-28	Loss	(Thailand) Phanrit Luksrirat	Onesongchai, Lumpinee Stadium	Bangkok, Thailand	Decision	5	3:00
1986-02-25	Loss	(Thailand) Samransak Muangsurin	Lumpinee Stadium	Bangkok, Thailand	KO (Punches)	2	
1985-11-29	Win	(Thailand) Phayanoi Sor.Thasanee	Lumpinee Stadium	Bangkok, Thailand	Decision	5	3:00
1985-11-05	Loss	(Thailand) Chanchai Sor Tamarangsri	Lumpinee Stadium	Bangkok, Thailand	Decision	5	3:00
1985-10-11	Win	(Thailand) Bangkhlanoi Sor.Thanikul	Lumpinee Stadium	Bangkok, Thailand	Decision	5	3:00
1985-08-27	Win	(Thailand) Ruengsaknoi Por.Phet	Lumpinee Stadium	Bangkok, Thailand	Decision	5	3:00
Wins the Lumpinee Stadium Flyweight (112 lbs) title.
1985-06-04	Loss	(Thailand) Ruengsaknoi Por.Phet	Lumpinee Stadium	Bangkok, Thailand	Decision	5	3:00
Loses the Lumpinee Stadium Flyweight (112 lbs) title.
1985-05-02	Win	(Thailand) Phayanoi Sor.Thasanee	Rajadamnern Stadium	Bangkok, Thailand	KO	4	
1985-04-02	Win	(Thailand) Phanrit Luksrirat	Lumpinee Stadium	Bangkok, Thailand	KO	3	
Wins the vacant Lumpinee Stadium Flyweight (112 lbs) title.
1985-02-26	Win	(Thailand) Jongrak Lukprabaht	Lumpinee Stadium	Bangkok, Thailand	Decision	5	3:00
1984-12-07	Win	(Thailand) Sakkasemnoi Fairtex	Lumpinee Stadium	Bangkok, Thailand	Decision	5	3:00
1984-10-30	Draw	(Thailand) Chanchai Sor Tamarangsri	Lumpinee Stadium	Bangkok, Thailand	Decision	5	3:00
1983-12-23	Win	(Thailand) Boonam Sor.Jarunee	Sapphasitthiprasong Camp	Warin Chamrap district, Thailand	Decision	5	3:00
1983-10-04	NC	(Thailand) Petchdam Lukborai	Lumpinee Stadium	Bangkok, Thailand	Wisanupon dismissed		
1983-05-29	Loss	(Thailand) Yongyuthnoi Sakchaisit	Lumpinee Stadium	Bangkok, Thailand	Decision	5	3:00
1983-04-29	Loss	(Thailand) Yongyuthnoi Sakchaisit	Lumpinee Stadium	Bangkok, Thailand	Decision	5	3:00
1983-04-05	Win	(Thailand) Boonam Sor.Jarunee	Onesongchai, Lumpinee Stadium	Bangkok, Thailand	Decision	5	3:00
1983-03-04	Loss	(Thailand) Phonsaknoi Sitchang	Lumpinee Stadium	Bangkok, Thailand	KO	2	
1983-01-07	Loss	(Thailand) Palannoi Kiatanan	Lumpinee Stadium	Bangkok, Thailand	Decision	5	3:00
1982-12-07	Loss	(Thailand) Sornsilp Sitnoenphayom	Lumpinee Stadium	Bangkok, Thailand	Decision	5	3:00
Loses the Lumpinee Stadium Super Flyweight (115 lbs) title.
1982-10-13	Win	(Thailand) Lankrung Kiatkriankgrai	Rajadamnern Stadium	Bangkok, Thailand	Decision	5	3:00
1982-08-24	Loss	(Thailand) Kongtoranee Payakaroon	Lumpinee Stadium	Bangkok, Thailand	Decision	5	3:00
1982-06-22	Win	(Thailand) Fonluang Luksadetmaepuanthong	Lumpinee Stadium	Bangkok, Thailand	Decision	5	3:00
Wins the Lumpinee Stadium Super Flyweight (115 lbs) title.
1982-03-12	Win	(Thailand) Makhamphet Rojsongkram	Lumpinee Stadium	Bangkok, Thailand	Decision	5	3:00
Wins the Lumpinee Stadium Light Flyweight (108 lbs) title.
1982-02-09	Win	(Thailand) Prabphiphob Lukklongtan	Lumpinee Stadium	Bangkok, Thailand	Decision	5	3:00
1982-01-15	Win	(Thailand) Khunponnoi Sor.Thanongsak	Lumpinee Stadium	Bangkok, Thailand	KO (Elbow)	5	
1981-12-04	Loss	(Thailand) Chamuekpet Hapalang	Lumpinee Stadium	Bangkok, Thailand	Decision	5	3:00
1981-10-13	Win	(Thailand) Tor Lukprabat	Lumpinee Stadium	Bangkok, Thailand	Decision	5	3:00
1981-09-04	Loss	(Thailand) Chamuekpet Hapalang	Lumpinee Stadium	Bangkok, Thailand	Decision	5	3:00
1981-07-14	Win	(Thailand) Ruengchai Thairungruang	Lumpinee Stadium	Bangkok, Thailand	KO	3	
Wins the Lumpinee Stadium Pinweight (102 lbs) title.
1981-04-28	Win	(Thailand) Paruhatlek Sitchunthong	Lumpinee Stadium	Bangkok, Thailand	Decision	5	3:00
1980-10-31	Loss	(Thailand) Kiettisak Kongka	Lumpinee Stadium	Bangkok, Thailand	Decision	5	3:00
1980-10-14	Win	(Thailand) Fahmongkol Sitnoenpayom	Lumpinee Stadium	Bangkok, Thailand	Decision	5	3:00
1979-11-09	Loss	(Thailand) Paruhatlek Sitchunthong	Lumpinee Stadium	Bangkok, Thailand	Decision	5	3:00
For a 200,000 baht side-bet.
1979-10-02	Win	(Thailand) Siangaonoi Sit Bangprachan	Lumpinee Stadium	Bangkok, Thailand	Decision	5	3:00
1979-07-24		(Thailand) Chaovalit Sitphraphrom	Lumpinee Stadium	Bangkok, Thailand			
1979-06-08	Win	(Thailand) Siangaonoi Sit Bangprachan	Lumpinee Stadium	Bangkok, Thailand	Decision	5	3:00
Legend: Win Loss Draw/No contest Notes
