= Jampatong Na Nontachai =

Thai former professional Muay Thai fighter

- Jampatong in 2021
- Born: Saroj Kumjit; March 3, 1962; Mueang Ratchaburi, Ratchaburi, Thailand
- Native name: สาโรช คุ้มจิต
- Nickname: Master of Neck Kicks (จอมเตะก้านคอ)
- Division: Pinweight; Light Flyweight; Bantamweight; Featherweight
- Style: Muay Thai (Muay Tae)
- Stance: Orthodox
- Team: Porntawee Gym
- Years active: c. 1970s–1990

Other information
- Notable relatives: Kulabkhao Na Nontachai (older brother); Thongphet Na Nonthachai (younger brother)

Saroj Kumjit (Thai: สาโรช คุ้มจิต; born March 3, 1962), known professionally as Jampatong Na Nontachai (Thai: จำปาทอง ณ นนทชัย), is a Thai former professional Muay Thai fighter. He is a former Rajadamnern Stadium Bantamweight Champion who was famous during the 1970s and 1980s. Nicknamed the "Master of Neck Kicks", he was especially known for his high kicks from both sides.

== Career and biography ==
Jampatong was born in Ratchaburi Province, Thailand. He started Boxing at a young age as a means to help his family.

Early in his career, in June 1979, he gained two decision victories over Samart Payakaroon. In their third fight, due to Jampatong severely underperforming, the referee called a No contest.

In 1985, Jampatong won his first and last major title as he knocked out Sangtiennoi Sor.Rungroj with his signature high kick.

In 1986, he was a front runner for the Sports Writers Association of Thailand Fighter of the Year award but narrowly lost to Panomtuanlek Hapalang, the man who would take away Jampatong's Rajadamnern Stadium title later in that same year. In this year, he gained a shock upset win over Chamuekpet Hapalang as Jampatong knocked him out in the second round with his signature high kick.

Jampatong dove into a slump late in 1986 as he picked up losses against Jomwo Chuanyim, lost his Rajadamnern Stadium title to Panomtuanlek Hapalang.

In 1987, he suffered two of his worst defeats. In March, he was knocked out by a high kick against Suphaphet Kiatdipetnoi. In August, he was given another shot at the Rajadamnern Stadium title against former Lumpinee Stadium Champion, Yodpetch Sor.Chipattana. Jampatong was knocked out only 31 seconds into the fight.

Today, the former Yodmuay runs a noodle shop in Nonthaburi.

In June 2021, Sylvie von Duuglas-Ittu and her husband contacted Jampatong and filmed a long session with him for their Muay Thai Library at Jitmuangnon gym. It was the first time he had stepped into a ring in over 20 years.

== Titles and accomplishments ==
- Rajadamnern Stadium
  - 1985 Rajadamnern Stadium Bantamweight (118 lbs) Champion
    - Two successful title defenses

== Fight record ==
Muay Thai Record (Incomplete)
Date	Result	Opponent	Event	Location	Method	Round	Time
1990-06-07	Loss	(Thailand) Nuengsiam Kiatwichian	Lumpinee Stadium	Bangkok, Thailand	Decision	5	3:00
1990-03-29	Win	(Thailand) Wanpichit Kaennorasing	Lumpinee Stadium	Bangkok, Thailand	TKO (injury/shoulder dislocation)	4	
1990-02-19	Win	(Thailand) Den Sahakanosot	Rajadamnern Stadium	Bangkok, Thailand	Decision	5	3:00
1989-12-06	Loss	(Thailand) Taweechai Wor.Preecha	Rajadamnern Stadium	Bangkok, Thailand	KO	2	
1989-11-13	Win	(Thailand) Khunpon Chor.Rotchanachai	Rajadamnern Stadium	Bangkok, Thailand	Decision	5	3:00
1989-	Loss	(Thailand) Buranachai Tor.Tuwanon		Pattaya, Thailand	Decision	5	3:00
1989-07-27	Loss	(Thailand) Kwangthong Kilenthong	Rajadamnern Stadium	Bangkok, Thailand	Decision	5	3:00
1989-06-	Win	(Thailand) Manachai Na Patayya	Rajadamnern Stadium	Bangkok, Thailand	Decision	5	3:00
1989-05-13	Win	(Thailand) Khunpon Chor.Rotchanachai	Lumpinee Stadium	Bangkok, Thailand	Decision	5	3:00
1989-04-17	Win	(Thailand) Phetkasem Yuthakit	Rajadamnern Stadium	Bangkok, Thailand	Decision	5	3:00
1989-	Loss	(Thailand) Phetkasem Yuthakit	Rajadamnern Stadium	Bangkok, Thailand	Decision	5	3:00
1988-12-	Loss	(Thailand) Kwangthong Kilenthong	Rajadamnern Stadium	Bangkok, Thailand	KO	1	
1988-11-10	Loss	(Thailand) Chokdee Kiatpayathai	Rajadamnern Stadium	Bangkok, Thailand	Decision	5	3:00
1988-10-06	Win	(Thailand) Lukchang sitchang	Rajadamnern Stadium	Bangkok, Thailand	KO	3	
1988-09-	Loss	(Thailand) Sodsai kiatchaiyong	Rajadamnern Stadium	Bangkok, Thailand	Decision	5	3:00
1988-08-04	Win	(Thailand) Roengnoi Chomphuthong	Rajadamnern Stadium	Bangkok, Thailand	KO (punches)	5	
1988-07-14	Win	(Thailand) Phetkasem Yuthakit	Rajadamnern Stadium	Bangkok, Thailand	KO	4	
1988-05-05	Loss	(Thailand) Kwangthong Kilenthong	Rajadamnern Stadium	Bangkok, Thailand	Decision	5	3:00
1988-02-17	Loss	(Thailand) Wanpichit Kaennorasing	Rajadamnern Stadium	Bangkok, Thailand	Decision	5	3:00
1987-11-17	Loss	(Thailand) Grandprixnoi MuangChaiyapum	Lumpinee Stadium	Bangkok, Thailand	Decision	5	3:00
1987-10-26	Loss	(Thailand) Ruengchai Thairungruang	Lumpinee Stadium	Bangkok, Thailand	Decision	5	3:00
1987-08-25	Loss	(Thailand) Yodpetch Sor.Jitpattana	Lumpinee Stadium	Bangkok, Thailand	KO	1	0:17
For the vacant Lumpinee Stadium Bantamweight (118 lbs) title.
1987-07-23	Win	(Thailand) Kongnapa Luktabfa	Rajadamnern Stadium	Bangkok, Thailand	Decision	5	3:00
1987-05-20	Win	(Thailand) Kengkajnoi Kiatniwat	Rajadamnern Stadium	Bangkok, Thailand	KO (High kick)	5	2:35
1987-04-17	Win	(Thailand) Grandprixnoi Muangchaiyaphum	Rajadamnern Stadium	Bangkok, Thailand	Decision	3	3:00
1987-03-12	Loss	(Thailand) Suphaphet Kiatdiphetnoi	Rajadamnern Stadium	Bangkok, Thailand	KO (right high kick)		
1987-01-29	Loss	(Thailand) Sombat Sor.Thanikul	Rajadamnern Stadium	Bangkok, Thailand	Decision	5	3:00
1986-12-25	Draw	(Thailand) Jomwo Sakniran	Rajadamnern Stadium	Bangkok, Thailand	Decision	5	3:00
1986-10-29	Loss	(Thailand) Panomtuanlek Hapalang	Rajadamnern Stadium	Bangkok, Thailand	Decision	5	3:00
1986-09-25	Loss	(Thailand) Panomtuanlek Hapalang	Rajadamnern Stadium	Bangkok, Thailand	Decision	5	3:00
Loses the Rajadamnern Stadium Bantamweight (118 lbs) title.
1986-09-05	Loss	(Thailand) Chamuakpet Hapalang	Rajadamnern Stadium	Bangkok, Thailand	Decision	5	3:00
1986-07-10	Loss	(Thailand) Jomwo Chernyim	Rajadamnern Stadium	Bangkok, Thailand	Decision	5	3:00
1986-06-12	Win	(Thailand) Chamuakpet Hapalang	Rajadamnern Stadium	Bangkok, Thailand	KO (right high kick)	2	
1986-04-23	Win	(Thailand) Saencherng Pinsinchai	Rajadamnern Stadium	Bangkok, Thailand	KO (left high kick)	2	
1986-03-17	Win	(Thailand) Sangtiennoi Sitsurapong	Rajadamnern Stadium	Bangkok, Thailand	Decision	5	3:00
1985-12-12	Win	(Thailand) Lankrung Kiatkriankgrai	Rajadamnern Stadium	Bangkok, Thailand	Decision (Unanimous)	3	3:00
Defends the Rajadamnern Stadium Bantamweight (118 lbs) title.
1985-10-31	Draw	(Thailand) Singdam Sakprayuth	Rajadamnern Stadium	Bangkok, Thailand	Decision	5	3:00
1985-09-23	Loss	(Thailand) Manasak Sor Ploenchit	Rajadamnern Stadium	Bangkok, Thailand	Decision	5	3:00
1985-09-05	Win	(Thailand) Boonam Sor.Jarunee	Rajadamnern Stadium	Bangkok, Thailand	KO (High Kick)	2	
Defends the Rajadamnern Stadium Bantamweight (118 lbs) title.
1985-08-05	Win	(Thailand) Sangtiennoi Sitsurapong	Rajadamnern Stadium	Bangkok, Thailand	KO (left high kick)	3	
For the vacant Rajadamnern Stadium Bantamweight (118 lbs) title.
1985-06-13	Win	(Thailand) Jack Kiatniwat	Rajadamnern Stadium	Bangkok, Thailand	Decision	5	3:00
1985-05-14	Loss	(Thailand) Phanmongkon Hor.Mahachai	Lumpinee Stadium	Bangkok, Thailand	Decision	5	3:00
1985-03-	Win	(Thailand) Ruengchai Thairungruang	Rajadamnern Stadium	Bangkok, Thailand	Decision	5	3:00
1985-01-	Win	(Thailand) Phanmongkon Hor.Mahachai	Rajadamnern Stadium	Bangkok, Thailand	Decision	5	3:00
1984-12-26	Win	(Thailand) Nakhonpathom Pinsinchai		Bangkok, Thailand	Decision	5	3:00
1984-11-22	Win	(Thailand) Jack Kiatniwat	Rajadamnern Stadium	Bangkok, Thailand	Decision	5	3:00
1984-09-27	Draw	(Thailand) Raerung Thammachart	Rajadamnern Stadium	Bangkok, Thailand	Decision	5	3:00
1984-04-19	Win	(Thailand) Lankrung Kiatkriankgrai		Bangkok, Thailand	Decision	5	3:00
1983-09-30	Win	(Thailand) Phanomnoi Lukprabat	Lumpinee Stadium	Bangkok, Thailand	KO (High kick)	2	
1983-04-14	Win	(Thailand) Seeoui Sor.Thanikul	Rajadamnern Stadium	Bangkok, Thailand	Decision	5	3:00
1982-06-29	Win	(Thailand) Saengphet Lukphaiom		Thailand	Decision	5	3:00
1982-03-13	Loss	(Thailand) Saengphet Lukphaiom		Chanthaburi province, Thailand	Referee stoppage	5	
1982-02-16	Win	(Thailand) Srimuang Singsuanngern	Lumpinee Stadium	Bangkok, Thailand	Decision	5	3:00
1981-12-17		(Thailand) Nungsakon	Samrong Stadium	Bangkok, Thailand	Decision	5	3:00
1981-04-20	Win	(Thailand) Maewnoi Singkhawat	Lumpinee Stadium	Bangkok, Thailand	Decision	5	3:00
1980-09-05	NC	(Thailand) Samart Payakaroon	Lumpinee Stadium	Bangkok, Thailand	Referee stoppage	4	3:00
1980-05-13	Loss	(Thailand) Paruhatlek Sitchunthong	Lumpinee Stadium	Bangkok, Thailand	KO	5	
1980-04-28	Loss	(Thailand) Poonlap Sakniran	Rajadamnern Stadium	Bangkok, Thailand	Decision	5	3:00
1979-11-09	Win	(Thailand) Damrongsak Sor Thanikul	Lumpinee Stadium	Bangkok, Thailand	Decision	5	3:00
1979-10-02	Loss	(Thailand) Kongsamut Sor.Thanikul	Lumpinee Stadium	Bangkok, Thailand	Decision	5	3:00
1979-08-17	Loss	(Thailand) Kongsamut Sor.Thanikul	Lumpinee Stadium	Bangkok, Thailand	Decision	5	3:00
1979-07-24	Win	(Thailand) Paruhatlek Sitchunthong	Lumpinee Stadium	Bangkok, Thailand	Decision	5	3:00
1979-06-26	Win	(Thailand) Samart Payakaroon	Lumpinee Stadium	Bangkok, Thailand	Decision	5	3:00
1979-06-08	Win	(Thailand) Samart Payakaroon	Lumpinee Stadium	Bangkok, Thailand	Decision	5	3:00
1979-04-20	Win	(Thailand) Meownoi Singchaprawat	Lumpinee Stadium	Bangkok, Thailand	Decision	5	3:00
1979-02-27	Win	(Thailand) Supakiat Ekayothin	Lumpinee Stadium	Bangkok, Thailand	Decision	5	3:00
1979-01-13	Loss	(Thailand) Paruhatlek Sitchunthong	Lumpinee Stadium	Bangkok, Thailand	Decision	5	3:00
	Loss	(Thailand) Thaninoi Sakniran	Lumpinee Stadium	Bangkok, Thailand	Decision	5	3:00
Legend: Win Loss Draw/No contest Notes
