= Paruhatlek Sitchunthong =

Thai former professional Muay Thai fighter

- Born: Chalee Kuntharee; September 2, 1961 (age 65); Thanyaburi, Pathum Thani, Thailand
- Native name: ชาลี กุลธารี
- Nickname: The Raging Bull of Rangsit Fields (กระทิงทุ่งรังสิต); Little Bull (กระทิงน้อย); The Graduate Boxer (นักชกปริญญา); The Ring Gentleman (สุภาพบุรุษสังเวียน)
- Height: 160 cm (5 ft 3 in)
- Division: Pinweight; Mini Flyweight; Light Flyweight; Flyweight
- Style: Muay Thai (Muay Mat)
- Stance: Orthodox
- Team: Sitchunthong Gym
- Years active: c. 1970–1992

Other information
- Notable relatives: Paruhat Loh-ngoen (older brother); Paruhatnoi Sitchunthong (younger brother)

Chalee Kuntharee (Thai: ชาลี กุลธารี; born September 2, 1961), known professionally as Paruhatlek Sitchunthong (Thai: พฤหัสเล็ก ศิษย์ชุนทอง), is a Thai former professional Muay Thai fighter. He is a former five-time Lumpinee Stadium champion across three weight classes who was famous in the 1980s and 1990s. He holds the distinction of being the only fighter to have defeated the legendary Samart Payakaroon in Muay Thai rules by knockout.

== Biography and career ==
Paruhatlek Sitchunthong, the sixth of nine children (seven sons, two daughters), hailed from a family of Muay Thai fighters in Pathum Thani, approximately 30 km (18.6 mi) north of Bangkok. All of his brothers were fighters, with his older brother, Paruhat Loh-ngoen also achieving fame as a Muay Thai fighter. Paruhatlek began his Muay Thai training at the age of 9 in a space near his house, with his father serving as his trainer. Just a few months later, he had his first fight, for which he earned only 15 baht.
A year later, Paruhatlek joined the Sichunthong gym, which was his family's business. Originally owned by his father, Kimchun Kuntharee, the gym continued to operate under the management of his mother, Luan Kuntharee, after his father's death.

He had his first fight in Lumpinee Stadium at the age of 16.

Paruhatlek Sitchunthong faced Samart Payakaroon a total of four times. In their second encounter, he secured victory by knockout in the third round with punches. His older brother, Paruhat Loh-ngoen had also fought with Samart Payakaroon and was one of two opponents that Samart said he was the most afraid (the other being Mafuang Weerapol).

Paruhatlek Sitchunthong was a five-times Lumpinee Stadium champion across four weight categories, consist of pinweight (102 lb), mini flyweight (104 lb, two-times), junior flyweight (108 lb), and flyweight (112 lb). To win his first belt Paruhatlek needed three attempts before being successful. At the peak of his career, he was paid a maximum of 120,000 baht.

Paruhatlek was regarded as a small shape fighter, therefore he was often at a disadvantage against his opponents. He was a tough fighter who never backed down, pushing forward for the win with his heavy punches. Hence, he was given the fierce alias of the "Raging Bull of Rangsit Fields", owing to his birthplace, Rangsit area. He also received another alias the "Ring Gentleman", during a fight against Fahlan Lukprabat he had his opponent on the verge of collapsing but chose to step back and let him lose by decision to avoid stripping him from his Rajadamnern Stadium belt.

He has been collecting the Muay Thai trunks he wore during his entire career, most of them are red trunks, because he often fought in the red corner.

== Titles & honours ==
- Lumpinee Stadium
  - 1981 Lumpinee Stadium Pinweight (102 lbs) Champion
    - One successful title defense
  - 1982 Lumpinee Stadium Pinweight (102 lbs) Champion
    - One successful title defense
  - 1983 Lumpinee Stadium Light Flyweight (108 lbs) Champion
    - Four successful title defenses
  - 1985 Lumpinee Stadium Light Flyweight (108 lbs) Champion
  - 1988 Lumpinee Stadium Flyweight (112 lbs) Champion
  - 1989 Lumpinee Stadium Fight of the Year (vs. Pongsiri Por Ruamrudee)

== Fight record ==
Muaythai record
Date	Result	Opponent	Event	Location	Method	Round	Time
1992-07-07	Loss	(Thailand) Singthong Lukrangsi	Onesongchai, Lumpinee Stadium	Bangkok, Thailand	Decision	5	3:00
1992-05-30	Loss	(Thailand) Kasemlek QualityGym	Lumpinee Stadium	Bangkok, Thailand	Decision	5	3:00
1992-05-02	Loss	(Thailand) Chatchai Paiseetong	Lumpinee Stadium	Bangkok, Thailand	Decision	5	3:00
1992-02-21	Loss	(Thailand) Kasemlek Singmanee	Lumpinee Stadium	Bangkok, Thailand	Decision	5	3:00
1991-07-30	Loss	(Thailand) Khunphet Johnnygym	Onesongchai, Lumpinee Stadium	Bangkok, Thailand	Decision	5	3:00
1991-06-14	Win	(Thailand) Naewrob Por.MuangUbon	Onesongchai, Lumpinee Stadium	Bangkok, Thailand	Decision	5	3:00
1991-04-20	Loss	(Thailand) Pornsak Muangsurin	Lumpinee Stadium	Bangkok, Thailand	Decision	5	3:00
1991-02-12	Loss	(Thailand) Nungubon Sitlerchai	Lumpinee Stadium	Bangkok, Thailand	Decision	5	3:00
1990-08-31	Loss	(Thailand) Orono Por Muang Ubon	Lumpinee Stadium	Bangkok, Thailand	Decision	5	3:00
1990-07-29	Win	(Netherlands) Maikel Lieuwfat		England	TKO	4	
1990-07-10	Loss	(Thailand) Chandet Sor Prantalay	Lumpinee Stadium	Bangkok, Thailand	Decision	5	3:00
1990-05-29	Loss	(Thailand) Mathee Jadeepitak	Lumpinee Stadium	Bangkok, Thailand	Decision	5	3:00
1990-04-30	Loss	(Thailand) Pongsiri Por Ruamrudee	Lumpinee Stadium	Bangkok, Thailand	Decision	5	3:00
1990-03-06	Loss	(Thailand) Chainoi Muangsurin	Lumpinee Stadium	Bangkok, Thailand	Decision	5	3:00
1990-01-30	Loss	(Thailand) Pongsiri Por Ruamrudee	Lumpinee Stadium	Bangkok, Thailand	Decision	5	3:00
1989-12-12	Win	(Thailand) Thanongchai Charoenmuang	Lumpinee Stadium	Bangkok, Thailand	Decision	5	3:00
1989-11-11	Loss	(Thailand) Toto Por.Pongsawang		Nakhon Pathom, Thailand	Decision	5	3:00
1989-11-03	Loss	(Thailand) Namkabuan Nongkeepahuyuth	Lumpinee Stadium	Bangkok, Thailand	Decision	5	3:00
1989-10-20	Loss	(Thailand) Pairojnoi Sor Siamchai	Lumpinee Stadium	Bangkok, Thailand	Decision	5	3:00
1989-09-08	Draw	(Thailand) Pairojnoi Sor Siamchai	Lumpinee Stadium	Bangkok, Thailand	Decision	5	3:00
1989-08-15	Draw	(Thailand) Pairojnoi Sor Siamchai	Lumpinee Stadium	Bangkok, Thailand	Decision	5	3:00
1989-07-25	Loss	(Thailand) Panphet Muangsurin	Lumpinee Stadium	Bangkok, Thailand	Decision	5	3:00
1989-06-26	Loss	(Thailand) Seesot Sahakarnosot	Rajadamnern Stadium	Bangkok, Thailand	Decision	5	3:00
1989-05-30	Draw	(Thailand) Pairojnoi Sor Siamchai	Lumpinee Stadium	Bangkok, Thailand	Decision	5	3:00
1989-05-02	Loss	(Thailand) Kaensak Sor.Ploenjit	Lumpinee Stadium	Bangkok, Thailand	Decision	5	3:00
Loses the Lumpinee Stadium Flyweight (112 lbs) title.
1989-03-29	Win	(Thailand) Toto Por.Pongsawang	Lumpinee Stadium	Bangkok, Thailand	Decision	5	3:00
1989-02-21	Loss	(Thailand) Langsuan Panyuthaphum	Lumpinee Stadium	Bangkok, Thailand	Decision	5	3:00
1989-01-06	Win	(Thailand) Pongsiri Por Ruamrudee	Lumpinee Stadium	Bangkok, Thailand	Decision	5	3:00
1988-12-02	Win	(Thailand) Seesot Sahakarnosot	Lumpinee Stadium	Bangkok, Thailand	Decision	5	3:00
1988-10-28	Loss	(Thailand) Karuhat Sor.Supawan	Lumpinee Stadium	Bangkok, Thailand	Decision	5	3:00
1988-10-11	Win	(Thailand) Hippy Singmanee	Lumpinee Stadium	Bangkok, Thailand	Decision	5	3:00
1988-09-09	Loss	(Thailand) Thammawit Sor.Badin	Lumpinee Stadium	Bangkok, Thailand	Decision	5	3:00
1988-08-18	Win	(Thailand) Odnoi Lukprabat	Rajadamnern Stadium	Bangkok, Thailand	Decision	5	3:00
1988-07-26	Loss	(Thailand) Veeraphol Sahaprom	Lumpinee Stadium	Bangkok, Thailand	Decision	5	3:00
1988-06-24	Win	(Thailand) Phetchan Sakwicha	Lumpinee Stadium	Bangkok, Thailand	Decision	5	3:00
1988-05-31	Win	(Thailand) Sangwannoi Sor.Rungroj	Lumpinee Stadium	Bangkok, Thailand	Decision	5	3:00
1988-05-03	Win	(Thailand) Detduang Por.Pongsawang	Lumpinee Stadium	Bangkok, Thailand	Decision	5	3:00
Wins the vacant Lumpinee Stadium Flyweight (112 lbs) title.
1988-03-25	Win	(Thailand) Wangchannoi Sor Palangchai	Lumpinee Stadium	Bangkok, Thailand	Decision	5	3:00
1988-03-04	Win	(Thailand) Hippy Singmanee	Lumpinee Stadium	Bangkok, Thailand	Decision	5	3:00
1988-01-26	Win	(Thailand) Morakot Chor.Waikul	Lumpinee Stadium	Bangkok, Thailand	Decision	5	3:00
1987-12-08	Loss	(Thailand) Odnoi Lukprabat	Lumpinee Stadium	Bangkok, Thailand	Decision	5	3:00
1987-10-19	Loss	(Thailand) Jaroenthong Kiatbanchong	Lumpinee Stadium	Bangkok, Thailand	Decision	5	3:00
1987-08-28	Loss	(Thailand) Langsuan Panyuthaphum	Lumpinee Stadium	Bangkok, Thailand	Decision	5	3:00
1987-07-24	Loss	(Thailand) Dokmaipa Por Pongsawang	Lumpinee Stadium	Bangkok, Thailand	Decision	5	3:00
1987-06-19	Win	(Thailand) Langsuan Panyuthaphum	Lumpinee Stadium	Bangkok, Thailand	Decision	5	3:00
1987-06-02	Win	(Thailand) Seesot Sor Ritthichai	Lumpinee Stadium	Bangkok, Thailand	KO (Punches)	2	
1987-04-10	Loss	(Thailand) Burklerk Pinsinchai	Lumpinee Stadium	Bangkok, Thailand	Decision	5	3:00
1987-03-06	Loss	(Thailand) Baeber Lukjaomaejamadewi	Lumpinee Stadium	Bangkok, Thailand	Decision	5	3:00
1987-02-06	Win	(Thailand) Dennuea Denmolee	Lumpinee Stadium	Bangkok, Thailand	KO (Punches)	1	
1987-01-13	Win	(Thailand) Dejsak Payaksakda	Lumpinee Stadium	Bangkok, Thailand	Decision	5	3:00
1986-12-19	Loss	(Thailand) Dejsak Payaksakda	Huamark Stadium	Bangkok, Thailand	Decision	5	3:00
1986-11-25	Loss	(Thailand) Burklerk Pinsinchai	Lumpinee Stadium	Bangkok, Thailand	Decision	5	3:00
For the Lumpinee Stadium Flyweight (112 lbs) title.
1986-09-12	Win	(Thailand) Wangchannoi Sor Palangchai	Lumpinee Stadium	Bangkok, Thailand	Decision	5	3:00
1986-08-22	Win	(Thailand) Dennuea Denmolee	Lumpinee Stadium	Bangkok, Thailand	Decision	5	3:00
1986-07-29	Win	(Thailand) Wangchannoi Sor Palangchai	Lumpinee Stadium	Bangkok, Thailand	Decision	5	3:00
1986-06-13	Win	(Thailand) Sueasaming Sitchang		Bangkok, Thailand	Decision	5	3:00
1986-05-06	Win	(Thailand) Paiboon Fairtex	Lumpinee Stadium	Bangkok, Thailand	Decision	5	3:00
1986-03-28	Win	(Thailand) Detduang Por.Pongsawang	Lumpinee Stadium	Bangkok, Thailand	Decision	5	3:00
1986-02-25	Win	(Thailand) Supernoi Sitchokchai	Lumpinee Stadium	Bangkok, Thailand	Decision	5	3:00
1986-01-18	Loss	(Thailand) Supernoi Sitchokchai	Lumpinee Stadium	Bangkok, Thailand	Decision	5	3:00
Loses the Lumpinee Stadium Light Flyweight (108 lbs) title.
1985-12-06	Win	(Thailand) Fahlan Lukprabat	Onesongchai, Lumpinee Stadium	Bangkok, Thailand	Decision (Unanimous)	5	3:00
Wins the vacant Lumpinee Stadium Light Flyweight (108 lbs) title.
1985-11-19	Loss	(Thailand) Kongsak Sitsamtahan	Chatuchok, Lumpinee Stadium	Bangkok, Thailand	Decision	5	3:00
1985-10-18	Win	(Thailand) Sangchai Singkiri	Lumpinee Stadium	Bangkok, Thailand	Decision	5	3:00
1985-09-20	Win	(Thailand) Dennuea Denmolee	Lumpinee Stadium	Bangkok, Thailand	Decision	5	3:00
1985-07-26	Loss	(Thailand) Odnoi Lukprabat	Onesongchai, Lumpinee Stadium	Bangkok, Thailand	Decision	5	3:00
Loses the Lumpinee Stadium Light Flyweight (108 lbs) title.
1985-05-10	Loss	(Thailand) Sangwannoi Sitsahapan	Lumpinee Stadium	Bangkok, Thailand	Decision	5	3:00
1985-04-16	Loss	(Thailand) Sanit Wichitkriengkrai	Lumpinee Stadium	Bangkok, Thailand	Decision	5	3:00
1985-04-02	Win	(Thailand) Odnoi Lukprabat	Onesongchai, Lumpinee Stadium	Bangkok, Thailand	KO	3	
Defends the Lumpinee Stadium Light Flyweight (108 lbs) title.
1985-01-25	Loss	(Thailand) Dennuea Denmolee		Chiang Mai, Thailand	Decision	5	3:00
1985-01-11	Draw	(Thailand) Detduang Por.Pongsawang	Lumpinee Stadium	Bangkok, Thailand	Decision	5	3:00
Defends the Lumpinee Stadium Light Flyweight (108 lbs) title.
1984-11-30	Win	(Thailand) Dennuea Denmolee	Lumpinee Stadium	Bangkok, Thailand	Decision	5	3:00
1984-11-09	Win	(Thailand) Wanlopnoi Nauamthong	Lumpinee Stadium	Bangkok, Thailand	Decision	5	3:00
1984-08-31	Win	(Thailand) Jomhod Luksamrong	Onesongchai, Lumpinee Stadium	Bangkok, Thailand	Decision	5	3:00
1984-07-31	Win	(Thailand) Paiboon Fairtex	Lumpinee Stadium	Bangkok, Thailand	TKO (broken arm)	4	
1984-04-24	Win	(Thailand) Chanchai Sor Tamarangsri	Onesongchai, Lumpinee Stadium	Bangkok, Thailand	Decision	5	3:00
1984-03-30	Draw	(Thailand) Chanchai Sor Tamarangsri	Lumpinee Stadium	Bangkok, Thailand	Decision	5	3:00
Defends the Lumpinee Stadium Light Flyweight (108 lbs) title.
1984-02-28	Win	(Thailand) Daoden Sor.Sakasem	Onesongchai, Lumpinee Stadium	Bangkok, Thailand	Decision	5	3:00
1984-01-31	Loss	(Thailand) Klaipathapee Majestic	Onesongchai, Lumpinee Stadium	Bangkok, Thailand	Decision	5	3:00
1983-12-26	Loss	(Thailand) Saencherng Pinsinchai	Lumpinee Stadium	Bangkok, Thailand	Decision	5	3:00
1983-11-11	Win	(Thailand) Ruengsaknoi Rojsongkram	Lumpinee Stadium	Bangkok, Thailand	Decision	5	3:00
1983-10-23	Loss	(Thailand) Ruengsaknoi Rojsongkram	Lumpinee Stadium	Bangkok, Thailand	Decision	5	3:00
1983-10-06	Win	(Thailand) Ole Sakwittaya		Saraburi, Thailand	KO	3	
1983-09-02	Loss	(Thailand) Ruengsaknoi Rojsongkram	Lumpinee Stadium	Bangkok, Thailand	Decision	5	3:00
1983-08-05	Win	(Thailand) Ole Sakwittaya	Lumpinee Stadium	Bangkok, Thailand	Decision	5	3:00
1983-07-12	Win	(Thailand) Yungnongkhai Sitwaiwat	Lumpinee Stadium	Bangkok, Thailand	KO	1	
Defends the Lumpinee Stadium Light Flyweight (108 lbs) title.
1983-05-24	Win	(Thailand) Sornaranoi Sakwittaya	Lumpinee Stadium	Bangkok, Thailand	Decision	5	3:00
1983-05-10	Win	(Thailand) Chakpethnoi Sitsei	Lumpinee Stadium	Bangkok, Thailand	Decision	5	3:00
1983-03-25	Loss	(Thailand) Chakpethnoi Sitsei	Lumpinee Stadium	Bangkok, Thailand	Decision	5	3:00
1983-03-12	Win	(Thailand) Saengphet Sor.Wongsiam		Chanthaburi, Thailand	Decision	5	3:00
Wins the vacant Lumpinee Stadium Light Flyweight (108 lbs) title.
1983-01-23	Loss	(Thailand) Nopachai Lukmingkwan	Lumpinee Stadium	Bangkok, Thailand	Decision	5	3:00
1983-01-07	Win	(Thailand) Kaophong Sitmorbon	Lumpinee Stadium	Bangkok, Thailand	Decision	5	3:00
Defends the Lumpinee Stadium Pinweight (102 lbs) title.
1982-12-07	Win	(Thailand) Chakpethnoi Sitsei	Lumpinee Stadium	Bangkok, Thailand	Decision	5	3:00
Wins the vacant Lumpinee Stadium Pinweight (102 lbs) title.
1982-11-13	Win	(Thailand) Yongyuthnoi Sakchaisit		Bangkok, Thailand	Decision	5	3:00
1982-10-15	Win	(Thailand) Sakkasemnoi Fairtex	Lumpinee Stadium	Bangkok, Thailand	Decision	5	3:00
1982-07-02	Loss	(Thailand) Yongyuthnoi Sakchaisit		Bangkok, Thailand	Decision	5	3:00
1982-06-11	Win	(Thailand) Paiboon Fairtex	Lumpinee Stadium	Bangkok, Thailand	Decision	5	3:00
1982-05-21	Loss	(Thailand) Palannoi Kiatanan	Lumpinee Stadium	Bangkok, Thailand	Decision	5	3:00
Loses the Lumpinee Stadium Pinweight (102 lbs) title.
1982-04-23	Loss	(Thailand) Ruengsaknoi Rojsongkram		Bangkok, Thailand	Decision	5	3:00
1982-04-02	Loss	(Thailand) Pornsaknoi Sitchang	Lumpinee Stadium	Bangkok, Thailand	Decision	5	3:00
1982-03-12	Win	(Thailand) Nopachai Lukmingkwan	Lumpinee Stadium	Bangkok, Thailand	KO	2	
Defends the Lumpinee Stadium Pinweight (102 lbs) title.
1982-01-15	Win	(Thailand) Ruengsaknoi Rojsongkram	Lumpinee Stadium	Bangkok, Thailand	Decision	5	3:00
1981-12-22	Win	(Thailand) Tor Kiattisakangka	Lumpinee Stadium	Bangkok, Thailand	Decision	5	3:00
Wins the Lumpinee Stadium Pinweight (102 lbs) title.
1981-11-17	Win	(Thailand) Boonam Sor.Jarunee	Lumpinee Stadium	Bangkok, Thailand	Decision	5	3:00
1981-10-23	Win	(Thailand) Ruengnarong Thairungruang	Onesongchai, Lumpinee Stadium	Bangkok, Thailand	Decision	5	3:00
1981-09-04	Loss	(Thailand) Wanmai Phetbandit	Lumpinee Stadium	Bangkok, Thailand	Decision	5	3:00
1981-07-14	Win	(Thailand) Wanmai Phetbandit	Lumpinee Stadium	Bangkok, Thailand	Decision	5	3:00
1981-05-19	Loss	(Thailand) Narak Sitkraisri	Onesongchai, Lumpinee Stadium	Bangkok, Thailand	Decision	5	3:00
1981-04-28	Loss	(Thailand) Wisanupon Saksamut	Lumpinee Stadium	Bangkok, Thailand	Decision	5	3:00
1981-04-20	Win	(Thailand) Weerachai Skahomkai	Lumpinee Stadium	Bangkok, Thailand	Decision	5	3:00
1980-12-05	Loss	(Thailand) Klaynoi Rasmeechan	Lumpinee Stadium	Bangkok, Thailand	Decision	5	3:00
1980-11-11	Win	(Thailand) Sichanglek Luk.KM-16	Lumpinee Stadium	Bangkok, Thailand	Decision	5	3:00
1980-10-14	Loss	(Thailand) Kattisak Gangka	Lumpinee Stadium	Bangkok, Thailand	Decision	5	3:00
1980-09-23	Loss	(Thailand) Chamuekpet Hapalang	Lumpinee Stadium	Bangkok, Thailand	Decision	5	3:00
For the Lumpinee Stadium Pinweight (102 lbs) title.
1980-08-29	Win	(Thailand) Somsaknoi Kiatyothin	Lumpinee Stadium	Bangkok, Thailand	Decision	5	3:00
1980-07-29	Win	(Thailand) Khoksamrong Sor.Sakwit	Lumpinee Stadium	Bangkok, Thailand	Decision	5	3:00
1980-06-28	Loss	(Thailand) Chamuekpet Hapalang	Lumpinee Stadium	Bangkok, Thailand	Decision	5	3:00
1980-06-07	Loss	(Thailand) Samart Payakaroon	Lumpinee Stadium	Bangkok, Thailand	Decision	5	3:00
For the Lumpinee Stadium Pinweight (102 lbs) title.
1980-05-13	Win	(Thailand) Jampatong Na Nontachai	Lumpinee Stadium	Bangkok, Thailand	KO	5	
1980-04-18	Win	(Thailand) Kongsamut Sor.Thanikul	Lumpinee Stadium	Bangkok, Thailand	Decision	5	3:00
1980-03-14	Loss	(Thailand) Samart Payakaroon		Pattaya, Thailand	Decision	5	3:00
1980-02-22	Win	(Thailand) Fahmongkol Sitnoenpayom	Lumpinee Stadium	Bangkok, Thailand	Decision	5	3:00
1979-12-11	Win	(Thailand) Fahmongkol Sitnoenpayom	Lumpinee Stadium	Bangkok, Thailand	Decision	5	3:00
1979-11-09	Win	(Thailand) Wisanupon Saksamut	Lumpinee Stadium	Bangkok, Thailand	Decision	5	3:00
Wins 200,000 baht side-bet.
1979-09-04	Loss	(Thailand) Kongsamut Sor Thanikul	Lumpinee Stadium	Bangkok, Thailand	Decision	5	3:00
1979-08-17	Win	(Thailand) Samart Payakaroon	Lumpinee Stadium	Bangkok, Thailand	KO	3	
1979-07-24	Loss	(Thailand) Jampatong Na Nontachai	Lumpinee Stadium	Bangkok, Thailand	Decision	5	3:00
1979-06-26	Win	(Thailand) Surachai Kangwanprai	Lumpinee Stadium	Bangkok, Thailand	Decision	5	3:00
1979-05-14	Win	(Thailand) Jockylek PhetUbon	Rajadamnern Stadium	Bangkok, Thailand	Decision	5	3:00
1979-04-20	Win	(Thailand) Weerachai Sakkomkhai	Lumpinee Stadium	Bangkok, Thailand	Decision	5	3:00
1979-02-23	Draw	(Thailand) Samart Payakaroon	Lumpinee Stadium	Bangkok, Thailand	Decision	5	3:00
1979-02-02	Loss	(Thailand) Supakiat Ekayothin	Lumpinee Stadium	Bangkok, Thailand	Decision	5	3:00
1979-01-13	Win	(Thailand) Jampatong Na Nontachai	Lumpinee Stadium	Bangkok, Thailand	Decision	5	3:00
Legend: Win Loss Draw/No contest Notes
