= Wanpichit Kaennorasing =

Thai Muay Thai fighter

- Born: Pichit Faisila; March 25, 1966; Nam Phong district, Khon Kaen province, Thailand
- Died: March 19, 1993 (aged 26); Sangha Hospital, Bangkok, Thailand
- Native name: พิชิต ฝ่ายศิลา
- Nickname: Jom Classic (จอมคลาสสิค)
- Division: Light Flyweight; Flyweight; Super Flyweight; Bantamweight; Super Bantamweight
- Style: Muay Thai
- Stance: Orthodox
- Team: Jocky Gym; Kaennorasing
- Trainer: Somat Hongsakul

Pichit Faisila (Thai: พิชิต ฝ่ายศิลา; born: March 25, 1966), known professionally as Wanpichit Kaennorasing (Thai: วันพิชิต แก่นนรสิงห์), is a Thai former Muay Thai fighter. He is a former two-division Rajadamnern Stadium champion who fought during the 1980s.

== Biography and career ==
Pichit Fasila started training in Muay Thai with his uncle, a former fighter named Songsak Klongphachon. He started competing in the provinces out of Kaennorasing gym where he would adopt the ring name Wanpichit Kaennorasing. He later joined Jocky gym to start competing in Bangkok in 1984.

Known for his fight IQ, Wanpichit he was considered a top fighter of the Bangkok circuit between 1986 and 1989. During this period he defeated many notable champions such as Langsuan Panyuthaphum, Kongnapa Watcharawit, Lankrung Kiatkriankgrai, Namphon Nongkeepahuyuth and Jampatong Na Nontachai. He also captured two stadium titles in 1987 and 1988 defeating Phayakdam Yutthakit for the Rajadamnern Stadium Super Flyweight title and Boonam Sor.Jarunee for the Rajadamnern Stadium Bantamweight title.

Between March 1987 and March 1988 Wanpichit won 13 out of 15 fights and was runner-up for the prestigious Sports Writers Association of Thailand Fighter of the Year award, narrowly losing to rival Langsuan Panyuthaphum.

On February 22, 1989, Wanpichit challenged for a stadium belt for the last time when he faced Chamuekpet Hapalang for the vacant Rajadamnern Stadium Super Bantamweight title. He lost the fight by decision. Wanpichit would never win a fight again as his body could no longer sustain hard training. He lost his last two bouts by technical knockout after dislocating the same shoulder both times and subsequently retired.

After his retirement from competition, Wanpichit ordained as a monk. He died on March 19, 1993, to a brain hemorrhage.

== Titles and accomplishments ==
- Rajadamnern Stadium
  - 1987 Rajadamnern Stadium Super Flyweight (115 lbs) Champion
    - One successful title defense
  - 1988 Rajadamnern Stadium Bantamweight (118 lbs) Champion

== Muay Thai record ==
Muay Thai Record
Date	Result	Opponent	Event	Location	Method	Round	Time
1990-03-29	Loss	(Thailand) Jampatong Na Nontachai	Lumpinee Stadium	Bangkok, Thailand	TKO (dislocated shoulder)	4	
1989-10-19	Loss	(Thailand) Mahaheng Tor.Boonlert	Mumnamgoen, Rajadamnern Stadium	Bangkok, Thailand	TKO (dislocated shoulder)	2	
1989-08-30	Loss	(Thailand) Boonam Sor.Jarunee	Rajadamnern Stadium	Bangkok, Thailand	Decision	5	3:00
1989-06-29	Loss	(Thailand) Chanalert Muanghatyai		Bangkok, Thailand	Decision	5	3:00
1989-05-08	Loss	(Thailand) Khanongmek Chomphuthong		Bangkok, Thailand	Decision	5	3:00
1989-03-20	Loss	(Thailand) Khanongmek Chomphuthong		Bangkok, Thailand	Decision	5	3:00
1989-02-22	Loss	(Thailand) Chamuekpet Hapalang	Wan Muay Thai + Palangnum, Rajadamnern Stadium	Bangkok, Thailand	Decision	5	3:00
For the vacant Rajadamnern Stadium Super Bantamweight (122 lbs) title.
1988-12-22	Win	(Thailand) Klaisuwit Soonkelanongkhi	Wan Muay Thai, Rajadamnern Stadium	Bangkok, Thailand	TKO (Right Cross)	1	2:49
1988-11-24	Win	(Thailand) Boonam Sor.Jarunee	Mumnamgoen, Rajadamnern Stadium	Bangkok, Thailand	Decision	5	3:00
1988-10-19	Win	(Thailand) Khanongmek Chomphuthong	Wan Muay Thai, Rajadamnern Stadium	Bangkok, Thailand	Decision	5	3:00
1988-09-26	Loss	(Thailand) Klaisuwit Soonkelanongkhi	Phettongkam, Rajadamnern Stadium	Bangkok, Thailand	Decision	5	3:00
Loses the Rajadamnern Stadium Bantamweight (118 lbs) title.
1988-08-29	Loss	(Thailand) Grandprixnoi Muangchaiyaphum	Jao Lok, Huamark Stadium	Bangkok, Thailand	Decision	5	3:00
1988-08-10	Win	(Thailand) Khanongmek Chomphuthong	Phettongkam, Rajadamnern Stadium	Bangkok, Thailand	Decision	5	3:00
1988-07-14	Draw	(Thailand) Kanongmek Chomphuthong	Mumnamgoen, Rajadamnern Stadium	Bangkok, Thailand	Decision	5	3:00
1988-05-09	Loss	(Thailand) Kongnapa Watcharawit	Huamark Stadium	Bangkok, Thailand	Decision	5	3:00
1988-03-24	Win	(Thailand) Boonam Sor.Jarunee	Rajadamnern Stadium	Bangkok, Thailand	Decision	5	3:00
Wins the Rajadamnern Stadium Bantamweight (118 lbs) title.
1988-02-17	Win	(Thailand) Jampatong Na Nontachai	Wan Muay Thai, Rajadamnern Stadium	Bangkok, Thailand	Decision	5	3:00
1988-02-17	NC	(Thailand) Ruengchai Thairungruang	Rajadamnern Stadium	Bangkok, Thailand	Ref.stop. (Ruengchai dismissed)	3	
1987-12-23	Win	(Thailand) Boonam Sor.Jarunee	Wan Muay Thai, Rajadamnern Stadium	Bangkok, Thailand	Decision	5	3:00
1987-11-23	Win	(Thailand) Namphon Nongkeepahuyuth		Buriram, Thailand	KO	3	
1987-10-29	Loss	(Thailand) Boonam Sor.Jarunee	Rajadamnern Stadium	Bangkok, Thailand	Decision	5	3:00
1987-10-12	Win	(Thailand) Boonmee Sitchuchon	Khaosai Galaxy vs Byung-Kwan Chung, Rajadamnern Stadium	Bangkok, Thailand	KO (Spinning elbow)	5	
Defends the Rajadamnern Stadium Super Flyweight (115 lbs) title.
1987-09-23	Win	(Thailand) Phayakdam Yutthakit	Wan Muay Thai, Rajadamnern Stadium	Bangkok, Thailand	Decision	5	3:00
1987-08-24	Win	(Thailand) Phayakdam Yutthakit	Rajadamnern Stadium	Bangkok, Thailand	Decision	5	3:00
Wins the vacant Rajadamnern Stadium Super Flyweight (115 lbs) title.
1987-06-29	Win	(Thailand) Lankrung Kiatkriankgrai	Kiatsingnoi, Rajadamnern Stadium	Bangkok, Thailand	Decision	5	3:00
1987-05-29	Loss	(Thailand) Yodpetch Sor.Jitpattana	Rajadamnern Stadium	Bangkok, Thailand	Decision	5	3:00
1987-05-13	Win	(Thailand) Waifai PrapatMotor	Wan Muay Thai, Rajadamnern Stadium	Bangkok, Thailand	Decision	5	3:00
1987-04-16	Win	(Thailand) Panpetch Sitpraprom	Rajadamnern Stadium	Bangkok, Thailand	Decision	5	3:00
1987-03-25	Win	(Thailand) Chanarit Lukpramanu	Rajadamnern Stadium	Bangkok, Thailand	KO	1	
1987-03-11	Win	(Thailand) Tongchai Charoenmuang	Rajadamnern Stadium	Bangkok, Thailand	Decision	5	3:00
1987-02-05	Win	(Thailand) Daoden Sor.Sakkasem	Daorung Chujaroen, Rajadamnern Stadium	Bangkok, Thailand	KO (Punch)	3	
1987-01-16	Win	(Thailand) Kongnapa Watcharawit	Chatuchok, Lumpinee Stadium	Bangkok, Thailand	Decision	5	3:00
1986-12-12	Loss	(Thailand) Mono Singhkaosaen	Chatuchok, Lumpinee Stadium	Bangkok, Thailand	Decision	5	3:00
1986-11-05	Win	(Thailand) Chinchoodaeng Petchmuangloi		Bangkok, Thailand	Decision	5	3:00
1986-10-01	Loss	(Thailand) Chinchoodaeng Petchmuangloi	Chalermchai, Rajadamnern Stadium	Bangkok, Thailand	Decision	5	3:00
1986-09-03	Loss	(Thailand) Rattananoi Bualuangprakanpay	Chalermchai, Rajadamnern Stadium	Bangkok, Thailand	Decision	5	3:00
1986-08-06	Win	(Thailand) Pokpong Issarapap	Chalermchai, Rajadamnern Stadium	Bangkok, Thailand	KO	4	
1986-07-06	Win	(Thailand) Langsuan Panyuthaphum	Chalermchai, Rajadamnern Stadium	Bangkok, Thailand	Decision	5	3:00
1986-06-	Win	(Thailand) Chainiyom Sitsao		Thailand	Decision	5	3:00
1986-06-02	Win	(Thailand) Wisanusak Sor.Weerakul	Khon Kaen Boxing Stadium	Khon Kaen province, Thailand	Decision	5	3:00
1986-04-22	Win	(Thailand) Wanphichit Sitporprommet	Samrong Stadium	Thailand	Decision	5	3:00
1986-04-02	Win	(Thailand) Oddnoi Por.Chaiwat	Rajadamnern Stadium	Bangkok, Thailand	Decision	5	3:00
1986-03-	Win	(Thailand) Khonkord Kiatbobe	Samrong Stadium	Khon Kaen province, Thailand	Decision	5	3:00
1986-02-	Loss	(Thailand) Wanphichit Sitporprommes	Samrong Stadium	Thailand	Decision	5	3:00
1986-02-08	Win	(Thailand) Sakchai Lionman	Lumpinee Stadium	Bangkok, Thailand	KO	2	
1986-01-11	Loss	(Thailand) Mono Singhkaosaen	Lumpinee Stadium	Bangkok, Thailand	Decision	5	3:00
1986-01-	Win	(Thailand) Sainoi Sor.Pholsaming		Khon Kaen province, Thailand	Decision	5	3:00
1985-12-	Win	(Thailand) Jaipetch Sakthawan		Khon Kaen province, Thailand	Decision	5	3:00
1985-12-21	Win	(Thailand) Nongsarai Phichitsuek		Thailand	KO	3	
1985-11-23	Loss	(Thailand) Starboy Lukbangbon		Chonburi province, Thailand	Decision	5	3:00
1985-	Win	(Thailand) Rungsing Sitsuchon		Chonburi province, Thailand	KO	2	
1985-	Win	(Thailand) Wanphichit Wirojkhamai		Khon Kaen province, Thailand	KO	4	
1985-	Win	(Thailand) Payu Kiatiadisorn		Surat Thani province, Thailand	Decision	5	3:00
1985-	Win	(Thailand) Daengnoi Mongkhonsarakham		Khon Kaen province, Thailand	Decision	5	3:00
1985-	Win	(Thailand) Dennarong Sitkaipa		Khon Kaen province, Thailand	Decision	5	3:00
1985-	Loss	(Thailand) Panchai Kanwanprai		Kalasin province, Thailand	Decision	5	3:00
1985-06-	Win	(Thailand) Meechai Sakchaireuang		Krawan, Thailand	Decision	5	3:00
1985-06-07	NC	(Thailand) Kongfah Luktapfah	Kiattisombob, Lumpinee Stadium	Bangkok, Thailand	Ref.stop. (Wanpichit dismissed)	5	
1985-05-03	Win	(Thailand) Sirirat Sakprasong	Chatuchok, Lumpinee Stadium	Thailand	Decision	5	3:00
1985-04-13	Loss	(Thailand) Rattananoi Tansringkarn		Thailand	Decision	5	3:00
1984-10-06	Loss	(Thailand) Chatsing Chomputhong	Lumpinee Stadium	Bangkok, Thailand	Decision	5	3:00
1984-07-07	Loss	(Thailand) Chansak Kiatkhunthong	Lumpinee Stadium	Bangkok, Thailand	Decision	5	3:00
1984-06-16	Win	(Thailand) Houston SasiprapaGym	Lumpinee Stadium	Bangkok, Thailand	Decision	5	3:00
1984-	Win	(Thailand) Yoongthong Sahaisilp		Chiang Mai, Thailand	KO	4	
1984-	Win	(Thailand) Jongangnoi Jitphitakchon		Chiang Mai, Thailand	Decision	5	3:00
1984-	Win	(Thailand) Fajamlong Silpakorn	Chaophraya Stadium	Thailand	Decision	5	3:00
1984-	Win	(Thailand) Daowut Kiatsanga	Chaophraya Stadium	Thailand	Decision	5	3:00
1983-11-16	Loss	(Thailand) Phet Saksongwat	Rajadamnern Stadium	Bangkok, Thailand	Decision	5	3:00
1983-09-12	Win	(Thailand) Phitakchai Sitchanyuth	Rajadamnern Stadium	Bangkok, Thailand	Decision	5	3:00
1983-07-10	Win	(Thailand) Naowarat Na Ratchawat	Rajadamnern Stadium	Bangkok, Thailand	Decision	5	3:00
Legend: Win Loss Draw/No contest Notes
