= Boonam Sor.Jarunee =

Thai former professional Muay Thai fighter

- Born: Phairat Phualai; August 28, 1963 (age 63); Mueang Kalasin, Kalasin, Thailand
- Native name: อ๊อดน้อย ลูกพระบาท
- Other names: Boonam Chor.Waikul (บุญนำ ช.ไวคุล)
- Nickname: Nine-lives Cat (แมวเก้าชีวิต)
- Division: Light Flyweight; Flyweight; Super Flyweight; Bantamweight; Super Bantamweight
- Style: Muay Thai (Muay Femur)
- Stance: Orthodox

Other information
- Occupation: Muay Thai trainer

Phairat Phualai (Thai: ไพรัช ภูอาลัย; August 28, 1963), known professionally as Boonam Sor.Jarunee (Thai: บุญนำ ศ.จารุณี), is a Thai former professional Muay Thai fighter. He is a former five-time Rajadamnern Stadium champion across three divisions who fought during the 1980s and 1990s.

== Biography and career ==
Boonam started training and competing in Muay Thai at the age of twelve with his older brother, Torsak Wayuphak. He fought during the Golden Era of Muay Thai against many notable fighters including Chamuekpet Hapalang, Kongtoranee Payakaroon, Panomtuanlek Hapalang, Jampatong Na Nontachai, Veeraphol Sahaprom, Paruhatlek Sitchunthong, Lankrung Kiatkriangkrai and Boonlai Sor.Thanikul. During his career, he captured five Rajadamnern Stadium belts across three divisions, defending them multiple times and winning a total of ten different title fights. Boonam fought at the highest level for almost 15 years and seemed about to quit many times but always managed to bounce back, earning him the nickname "Nine Lives Cat".

After retiring from competition Boonam became a trainer and moved to Japan. He currently teaches in Osaka.

== Titles and honours ==
- Rajadamnern Stadium
  - 1984 Rajadamnern Stadium Super Flyweight (112 lbs) title
    - Two successful defenses
  - 1985 Rajadamnern Stadium Super Flyweight (115 lbs) title
  - 1986 Rajadamnern Stadium Super Flyweight (115 lbs) title
    - One successful defense
  - 1987 Rajadamnern Stadium Bantamweight (118 lbs) title
    - One successful defense
  - 1989 Rajadamnern Stadium Bantamweight (118 lbs) title
    - One successful defense

== Fight record ==
Muay Thai Record
Date	Result	Opponent	Event	Location	Method	Round	Time
1994-10-16	Draw	(Japan) Hammer Matsui	World Shidokan Open '94	Tokyo, Japan	Decision	5	3:00
1993-04-05	Win	(Thailand) Singnoi Sor.Prasatporn	Phettongkam, Rajadamnern Stadium	Bangkok, Thailand	Decision	5	3:00
1992-01-22	Loss	(Thailand) Kanongmek Sitthichai	Rajadamnern Stadium	Bangkok, Thailand	Decision	5	3:00
1991-12-09	Win	(Thailand) Toiting Kiaphetnoi	Rajadamnern Stadium	Bangkok, Thailand	Decision	5	3:00
1991-07-24	Draw	(Thailand) Khamron Sor.Vorapin	Rajadamnern Stadium	Bangkok, Thailand	Decision	5	3:00
1991-05-02	Loss	(Thailand) Yokhunthap Sitkrupat	Rajadamnern Stadium	Bangkok, Thailand	KO (High kick)	3	
1991-03-28	Win	(Thailand) Daotai Kiattiprateung	Mumnangoen, Rajadamnern Stadium	Bangkok, Thailand	Decision	5	3:00
1991-01-10	Loss	(Thailand) Wanghin Por.Chaiwat	Rajadamnern Stadium	Bangkok, Thailand	Decision	5	3:00
For the vacant Rajadamnern Stadium Bantamweight (118 lbs) title.
1990-12-10	Loss	(Thailand) Santos Devy	Rajadamnern Stadium	Bangkok, Thailand	KO	1	
1990-11-14	Win	(Thailand) Veeraphol Sahaprom	Rajadamnern Stadium	Bangkok, Thailand	Decision	5	3:00
1990-09-19	Loss	(Thailand) Boonlai Sor.Thanikul	Rajadamnern Stadium	Bangkok, Thailand	Decision	5	3:00
1990-08-15	Win	(Thailand) Tongjai Charoenmuang	Rajadamnern Stadium	Bangkok, Thailand	Decision	5	3:00
1990-07-09	Win	(Thailand) Wanghin Por.Chaiwat	Rajadamnern Stadium	Bangkok, Thailand	Decision	5	3:00
1990-06-14	Draw	(Thailand) Wanghin Por.Chaiwat	Rajadamnern Stadium	Bangkok, Thailand	Decision	5	3:00
1990-03-29	Loss	(Thailand) Phajonjit Lukmatulee	Rajadamnern Stadium	Bangkok, Thailand	KO	4	
1990-02-22	Loss	(Thailand) Chanalert Muanghatyai	Rajadamnern Stadium	Bangkok, Thailand	Decision	5	3:00
For the Rajadamnern Stadium Bantamweight (118 lbs) title.
1990-02-01	Draw	(Thailand) Chanalert Muanghatyai	Rajadamnern Stadium	Bangkok, Thailand	Decision	5	3:00
1989-11-27	Win	(Thailand) Kanongmek Chomphutong	Rajadamnern Stadium	Bangkok, Thailand	KO	4	
1989-11-02	Draw	(Thailand) Kanongmek Chomphutong	Rajadamnern Stadium	Bangkok, Thailand	Decision	5	3:00
1989-08-30	Win	(Thailand) Wanpichit Kaennorasing	Rajadamnern Stadium	Bangkok, Thailand	Decision	5	3:00
1989-07-27	Win	(Thailand) Payakdam Yutthakit	Rajadamnern Stadium	Bangkok, Thailand	Decision	5	3:00
1989-06-05	Loss	(Thailand) Kanongmek Chomphutong	Rajadamnern Stadium	Bangkok, Thailand	Decision	5	3:00
1989-04-27	Loss	(Thailand) Chanalert Muanghatyai	Rajadamnern Stadium	Bangkok, Thailand	Decision	5	3:00
Loses the Rajadamnern Stadium Bantamweight (118 lbs) title.
1989-03-20	Win	(Thailand) Klaisuwit Soonkelanongkhee	Rajadamnern Stadium	Bangkok, Thailand	Decision	5	3:00
Defends the Rajadamnern Stadium Bantamweight (118 lbs) title.
1989-02-13	Win	(Thailand) Klaisuwit Soonkelanongkhee	Rajadamnern Stadium	Bangkok, Thailand	Decision	5	3:00
Wins the Rajadamnern Stadium Bantamweight (118 lbs) title.
1989-01-19	Win	(Thailand) Grandprixnoi Muangchaiyaphum	Rajadamnern Stadium	Bangkok, Thailand	Decision	5	3:00
1988-11-24	Loss	(Thailand) Wanpichit Kaennorasing	Mumnamgoen, Rajadamnern Stadium	Bangkok, Thailand	Decision	5	3:00
1988-10-19	Win	(Thailand) Dennuea Denmolee	Rajadamnern Stadium	Bangkok, Thailand	Decision	5	3:00
1988-09-30	Win	(Thailand) Boonmee Sitchuchon		Bangkok, Thailand	Decision	5	3:00
1988-08-22	Win	(Thailand) Dennuea Denmolee	Rajadamnern Stadium	Bangkok, Thailand	Decision	5	3:00
1988-07-14	Loss	(Thailand) Kanongmek Chomphutong	Rajadamnern Stadium	Bangkok, Thailand	TKO	1	
1988-03-24	Loss	(Thailand) Wanpichit Kaennorasing	Rajadamnern Stadium	Bangkok, Thailand	Decision	5	3:00
Loses the Rajadamnern Stadium Bantamweight (118 lbs) title.
1988-02-18	Win	(Thailand) Chanalert Muanghatyai	Rajadamnern Stadium	Bangkok, Thailand	Decision	5	3:00
Defends the Rajadamnern Stadium Bantamweight (118 lbs) title.
1987-12-23	Loss	(Thailand) Wanpichit Kaennorasing	Wan Muay Thai, Rajadamnern Stadium	Bangkok, Thailand	Decision	5	3:00
1987-11-26	Win	(Thailand) Ruengchai Thairungruang	Rajadamnern Stadium	Bangkok, Thailand	Decision	5	3:00
Wins the Rajadamnern Stadium Bantamweight (118 lbs) title.
1987-10-29	Win	(Thailand) Wanpichit Kaennorasing	Rajadamnern Stadium	Bangkok, Thailand	Decision	5	3:00
1987-09-30	Win	(Thailand) Daoden Sor.Sakasem		Bangkok, Thailand	KO	3	
1987-09-05	Loss	(Thailand) Boonmee Sitchuchon	WBC - Sot Chitalada vs Rae Ki Ahn, Huamark Stadium	Bangkok, Thailand	Decision	5	3:00
1987-06-24	Loss	(Thailand) Burklerk Pinsinchai	Lumpinee Stadium	Bangkok, Thailand	Decision	5	3:00
1987-05-21	Win	(Thailand) Phodam Chuwattana		Bangkok, Thailand	Decision	5	3:00
1987-04-06	Loss	(Thailand) Payakdam Yuthakit	Wan Muay Thai, Rajadamnern Stadium	Bangkok, Thailand	Decision	5	3:00
1987-01-29	Loss	(Thailand) Lankrung Kiatkriangkrai	Rajadamnern Stadium	Bangkok, Thailand	Decision	5	3:00
Loses the Rajadamnern Stadium Super Flyweight (115 lbs) title.
1986-12-25	Win	(Thailand) Ruengchai Thairungruang	Rajadamnern Stadium	Bangkok, Thailand	Decision	5	3:00
Defends the Rajadamnern Stadium Super Flyweight (115 lbs) title.
1986-10-29	Win	(Thailand) Ruengchai Thairungruang	Rajadamnern Stadium	Bangkok, Thailand	Decision	5	3:00
Wins the vacant Rajadamnern Stadium Super Flyweight (115 lbs) title.
1986-09-25	Win	(Thailand) Phisuj Sor.Jitpattana	Rajadamnern Stadium	Bangkok, Thailand	Decision	5	3:00
1986-09-08	Win	(Thailand) Lukchang Sitchang		Bangkok, Thailand	Decision	5	3:00
1986-07-31	Loss	(Thailand) Phanrit Luksrirat		Roi Et province, Thailand	Decision	5	3:00
1986-06-12	Loss	(Thailand) Panomtuanlek Hapalang	Rajadamnern Stadium	Bangkok, Thailand	KO	3	
1986-05-23	Loss	(Thailand) Phisuj Sor.Jitpattana	Rajadamnern Stadium	Bangkok, Thailand	Decision	5	3:00
1986-04-03	Loss	(Thailand) Payakdam Yuthakit	Rajadamnern Stadium	Bangkok, Thailand	Decision	5	3:00
1986-03-13	Win	(Thailand) Lankrung Kiatkriangkrai	Mumnamgoen, Rajadamnern Stadium	Bangkok, Thailand	Decision	5	3:00
1986-01-31	Win	(Thailand) Detduang Por.Pongsawang	Lumpinee Stadium	Bangkok, Thailand	Decision	5	3:00
1985-11-22	Win	(Thailand) Nopachai Lukmingkhwan	Lumpinee Stadium	Bangkok, Thailand	Decision	5	3:00
1985-10-24	Loss	(Thailand) Phisuj Sor.Jitpattana	Rajadamnern Stadium	Bangkok, Thailand	Decision	5	3:00
Loses the Rajadamnern Stadium Super Flyweight (115 lbs) title.
1985-09-05	Loss	(Thailand) Jampatong Na Nontachai	Rajadamnern Stadium	Bangkok, Thailand	KO (high kick)	2	
For the Rajadamnern Stadium Bantamweight (118 lbs) title.
1985-08-	Win	(Thailand) Phayanoi Sor.Thasanee	Rajadamnern Stadium	Bangkok, Thailand	Decision	5	3:00
Wins the Rajadamnern Stadium Super Flyweight (115 lbs) title.
1985-06-24	Win	(Thailand) Detduang Por.Pongsawang	Lumpinee Stadium	Bangkok, Thailand	Decision	5	3:00
Defends the Rajadamnern Stadium Flyweight (112 lbs) title.
1985-05-13	Loss	(Thailand) Chamuekpet Hapalang	Wan Muay Thai Rajadamnern Stadium	Bangkok, Thailand	Decision	5	3:00
1985-03-06	Win	(Thailand) Daoden Sor.Sakasem	WBA - Khaosai Galaxy vs Dong Chun Lee, Rajadamnern Stadium	Bangkok, Thailand	KO	2	
Defends the Rajadamnern Stadium Flyweight (112 lbs) title.
1984-12-17	Win	(Thailand) Lankrung Kiatkriangkrai	Lumpinee Stadium	Bangkok, Thailand	Decision	5	3:00
1984-11-21	Win	(Thailand) Sangyuth Thianhiran	Rajadamnern Stadium	Bangkok, Thailand	Decision	5	3:00
Wins the Rajadamnern Stadium Flyweight (112 lbs) title.
1984-09-21	Win	(Thailand) Kamanit Kiatnakornchon	Petchyindee, Lumpinee Stadium	Bangkok, Thailand	Decision	5	3:00
1984-08-29	Win	(Thailand) Rungruang Lukphrabat	Rajadamnern Stadium	Bangkok, Thailand	Decision	5	3:00
1983-12-23	Loss	(Thailand) Wisanupon Saksamut	Sapphasitthiprasong Camp	Warin Chamrap district, Thailand	Decision	5	3:00
1983-08-03	Loss	(Thailand) Chaovalit Sitphraphrom	Palangnum, Rajadamnern Stadium	Bangkok, Thailand	Decision	5	3:00
1983-04-05	Loss	(Thailand) Wisanupon Saksamut	Onesongchai, Lumpinee Stadium	Bangkok, Thailand	Decision	5	3:00
1983-02-14	Win	(Thailand) Ruengchai Thairungruang	Rajadamnern Stadium	Bangkok, Thailand	Decision	5	3:00
1982-12-24	Loss	(Thailand) Lankrung Kiatkriangkrai	Mumnangoen, Rajadamnern Stadium	Bangkok, Thailand	Decision	5	3:00
For the vacant Rajadamnern Stadium Flyweight (112 lbs) title.
1982-11-22	Win	(Thailand) Kongtoranee Payakaroon	Rajadamnern Stadium	Bangkok, Thailand	Decision	5	3:00
1982-02-12	Loss	(Thailand) Somsrilek Sit Porpromet	Samrong Stadium	Samut Prakan, Thailand	Decision	5	3:00
1982-01-28	NC	(Thailand) Sangyuth Thianhiran	Wan Muay Thai, Rajadamnern Stadium	Bangkok, Thailand	Sangyuth dimissed	5	
1981-11-17	Loss	(Thailand) Paruhatlek Sitchunthong	Onesongchai, Lumpinee Stadium	Bangkok, Thailand	Decision	5	3:00
1981-10-06	Win	(Thailand) Paiboon Fairtex		Bangkok, Thailand	Decision	5	3:00
1981-	Win	(Thailand) Yoknoi Fairtex		Bangkok, Thailand	Decision	5	3:00
Legend: Win Loss Draw/No contest Notes
