= Teeraporn Saengano =

Thai boxer and muay thai fighter

- Born: November 3, 1962 (age 63); Dusit district, Bangkok, Thailand
- Other names: Bualuang Saengano; Lankrung Luksoi1 (ลั่นกรุง ลูกซอย 1)
- Division: Pinweight; Mini Flyweight; Light Flyweight; Flyweight; Super Flyweight
- Style: Muay Thai; Boxing

Professional boxing record
- Total: 2
- Wins: 2
- Losses: 0

Other information
- Boxing record from BoxRec

Teeraporn Saengano (Thai: ธีระพร แสงอะโน; born: 3 November 1962), also known as Lankrung Kiatkriangkrai (Thai: ลั่นกรุง เกียรติเกรียงไกร) is a Thai boxer and Muay Thai fighter. He competed in the men's flyweight boxing event at the 1984 Summer Olympics. In Muay Thai he was a two-division Rajadamnern Stadium champion.

== Biography and career ==
Teeraporn started training in Muay Thai as a child under his father who used to compete at the Lumpinee Stadium under the name Arun Singtothong.

== Titles and accomplishments ==
=== Muay Thai ===
- Rajadamnern Stadium
  - 1979 8-Tukatathong Tournament Winner
  - 1982 Rajadamnern Stadium Flyweight (112 lbs) Champion
    - Two successful title defenses
  - 1987 Rajadamnern Stadium Super Flyweight (115 lbs) Champion

=== Amateur boxing ===
- 1984 King's Cup Bantamweight (gold)

== Professional boxing record ==
2 fights	2 wins	0 losses
By decision	2	0

No.	Result	Record	Opponent	Type	Round, time	Date	Location	Notes
2	Win	2–0	Narong Monya	UD	10	28 Mar 1990	Rajadamnern Stadium, Bangkok, Thailand	
1	Win	1–0	Jorge Cano	PTS	10	8 Apr 1985	Bangkok, Thailand	

== Muay Thai record ==
Muay Thai Record
Date	Result	Opponent	Event	Location	Method	Round	Time
1989-04-13	Win	(Thailand) Khajondet Petchrapieb	Rajadamnern Stadium	Bangkok, Thailand	Decision	3	3:00
1988-10-24	Loss	(Thailand) Phajjanjit Lukmatuli	Wan Muay Thai, Rajadamnern Stadium	Bangkok, Thailand	Decision	5	3:00
1988-05-26	Win	(Thailand) Chumpuang Chomphuthong	Mumnangoen, Rajadamnern Stadium	Bangkok, Thailand	Decision	5	3:00
1988-02-29	Win	(Thailand) Phetsiam Kiatsingnoi	Phettongkam, Rajadamnern Stadium	Bangkok, Thailand	Decision	5	3:00
1987-09-05	Loss	(Thailand) Kongnapa Lukthapfa	WBC - Sot Chitalada vs Rae Ki Ahn, Huamark Stadium	Bangkok, Thailand	Decision	5	3:00
1987-06-29	Loss	(Thailand) Wanpichit Kaennorasing	Rajadamnern Stadium	Bangkok, Thailand	Decision	5	3:00
1987-04-22	Loss	(Thailand) Kongnapa Lukthapfa	Rajadamnern Stadium	Bangkok, Thailand	Decision	5	3:00
1987-02-24	Loss	(Thailand) Grandprixnoi Muangchaiyaphum	Petchyindee, Lumpinee Stadium	Bangkok, Thailand	Decision	5	3:00
1987-01-29	Win	(Thailand) Boonam Sor.Jarunee	Rajadamnern Stadium	Bangkok, Thailand	Decision	3	3:00
Wins the Rajadamnern Stadium Super Flyweight (115 lbs) title.
1986-10-29	Win	(Thailand) Lukchang Sit Chang	Wan Muay Thai, Rajadamnern Stadium	Bangkok, Thailand	Decision	5	3:00
1986-09-25	Win	(Thailand) Nopchai Lukmingkwa	Mumnamgoen, Rajadamnern Stadium	Bangkok, Thailand	KO	2	
1986-04-03	Loss	(Thailand) Raering Thamachat	Mumnamgoen, Rajadamnern Stadium	Bangkok, Thailand	Decision	5	3:00
1986-03-13	Loss	(Thailand) Boonam Sor.Jarunee	Mumnamgoen, Rajadamnern Stadium	Bangkok, Thailand	Decision	5	3:00
1986-01-27	Win	(Thailand) Ruengchai Thairungruang	Rajadamnern Stadium	Bangkok, Thailand	Decision	5	3:00
1985-12-12	Loss	(Thailand) Jampatong Na Nontachai	Rajadamnern Stadium	Bangkok, Thailand	Decision (Unanimous)	3	3:00
For the Rajadamnern Stadium Bantamweight (118 lbs) title.
1985-11-22	Win	(Thailand) Phisut Sor.Jitpattana		Bangkok, Thailand	KO	4	
1984-12-17	Win	(Thailand) Boonam Sor.Jarunee	Mumnangoen, Rajadamnern Stadium	Bangkok, Thailand	Decision	5	3:00
1984-11-21	Win	(Thailand) Awut Sor.Thanikul	Chatuchok, Lumpinee Stadium	Bangkok, Thailand	KO	1	
1984-10-01	Loss	(Thailand) Sangyuth Thianhiran	Rajadamnern Stadium	Bangkok, Thailand	Decision	5	3:00
Loses the Rajadamnern Stadium Flyweight (112 lbs) title.
1984-05-11	Win	(Thailand) Rung Sakprasong	Thahanseua Sukthi, Lumpinee Stadium	Bangkok, Thailand	Decision	5	3:00
1984-04-19	Loss	(Thailand) Jampatong Na Nontachai		Bangkok, Thailand	Decision	5	3:00
1984-03-09	Loss	(Thailand) Bangkhlanoi Sor.Thanikul	Onesongchai, Lumpinee Stadium	Bangkok, Thailand	Decision	5	3:00
1983-12-06	Win	(Thailand) Athit Majestic	Chatuchok, Lumpinee Stadium	Bangkok, Thailand	KO	4	
1983-11-11	Loss	(Thailand) Bangkhlanoi Sor.Thanikul	Onesongchai, Lumpinee Stadium	Bangkok, Thailand	Decision	5	3:00
1983-10-13	Win	(Thailand) Phornsaknoi Sitchang	Rajadamnern Stadium	Bangkok, Thailand	Decision	5	3:00
1983-08-24	Win	(Thailand) Chaowalit Sitphraphrom	Rajadamnern Stadium	Bangkok, Thailand	Decision	5	3:00
Defends the Rajadamnern Stadium Flyweight (112 lbs) title.
1983-07-21	Win	(Thailand) Phayanoi Sor.Thasanee	Mumnamgoen, Rajadamnern Stadium	Bangkok, Thailand	Decision	5	3:00
1983-05-12	Win	(Thailand) Chaowalit Sitphraphrom	Mumnamgoen, Rajadamnern Stadium	Bangkok, Thailand	Decision	5	3:00
Defends the Rajadamnern Stadium Flyweight (112 lbs) title.
1983-03-30	Win	(Thailand) Noppachai Lukmingkwan	Kiatsingnoi, Rajadamnern Stadium	Bangkok, Thailand	KO (Punches)	2	
1983-03-04	Loss	(Thailand) Kongtoranee Payakaroon	Lumpinee Stadium	Bangkok, Thailand	Decision	5	3:00
1983-02-04	Loss	(Thailand) Palannoi Kiatanan		Bangkok, Thailand	Decision	5	3:00
1982-12-24	Win	(Thailand) Boonam Sor.Jarunee	Rajadamnern Stadium	Bangkok, Thailand	Decision	5	3:00
Wins the vacant Rajadamnern Stadium Flyweight (112 lbs) title.
1982-11-04	Win	(Thailand) Thanusuk Rachasakmontri	Rajadamnern Stadium	Bangkok, Thailand	TKO	3	
1982-10-13	Loss	(Thailand) Wisanupon Saksamut	Wan Tamruat, Rajadamnern Stadium	Bangkok, Thailand	Decision	5	3:00
1982-09-13	Win	(Thailand) Samernai Ketsongkram	Rajadamnern Stadium	Bangkok, Thailand	Decision	5	3:00
1982-08-19	Win	(Thailand) Samernai Ketsongkram	Rajadamnern Stadium	Bangkok, Thailand	Decision	5	3:00
1982-07-12	Win	(Thailand) Fakhamram Lukphrabat	Rajadamnern Stadium	Bangkok, Thailand	Decision	5	3:00
1982-06-21	Win	(Thailand) Rungruang Lukphrabat	Phettongkam, Rajadamnern Stadium	Bangkok, Thailand	KO (Right cross)	4	
1982-05-27	Win	(Thailand) Thanusuk Rachasakmontri	Rajadamnern Stadium	Bangkok, Thailand	Decision	5	3:00
1982-03-29	Win	(Thailand) Den Chuwatana	Rajadamnern Stadium	Bangkok, Thailand	Decision	5	3:00
1982-03-11	Win	(Thailand) Phodam Sor.Sermpong	Rajadamnern Stadium	Bangkok, Thailand	Decision	5	3:00
1982-01-28	Loss	(Thailand) Rungruang Lukphrabat	Rajadamnern Stadium	Bangkok, Thailand	Decision	5	3:00
1981-12-03	Win	(Thailand) Khwanjai Sak Udon	Rajadamnern Stadium	Bangkok, Thailand	Decision	5	3:00
1981-11-09	Win	(Thailand) Thongchai Jaroenmuang	Rajadamnern Stadium	Bangkok, Thailand	Decision	5	3:00
1981-10-14	Win	(Thailand) Khwanjai Sak Udon	Rajadamnern Stadium	Bangkok, Thailand	Decision	5	3:00
1981-08-20	Win	(Thailand) Chatri Lukpailuang		Bangkok, Thailand	Decision	5	3:00
1981-08-20	Win	(Thailand) Wasan Sitsao		Bangkok, Thailand	Decision	5	3:00
1981-07-23	Loss	(Thailand) Chamuekpet Hapalang	Mumnamgoen, Rajadamnern Stadium	Bangkok, Thailand	Decision	5	3:00
For the Rajadamnern Stadium Mini Flyweight (105 lbs) title.
1981-05-	Win	(Thailand) Aladdin Luksuan	Chaophraya Stadium	Thailand	KO	3	
1981-04-08	Win	(Thailand) Thanuphet Petchkriangkrai		Bangkok, Thailand	Decision	5	3:00
1981-03-25	Loss	(Thailand) Chamuekpet Hapalang	Rajadamnern Stadium	Bangkok, Thailand	Decision	5	3:00
1981-02-18	Loss	(Thailand) Klaynoi Rasmichan		Bangkok, Thailand	Decision	5	3:00
1980-12-31	Win	(Thailand) Khewpit Chuwattana		Bangkok, Thailand	Decision	5	3:00
1980-11-22	Loss	(Thailand) Khewpit Chuwattana		Bangkok, Thailand	Decision	5	3:00
1980-10-09	Win	(Thailand) Malek Kiatsingnoi		Bangkok, Thailand	Decision	5	3:00
1980-08-28	Win	(Thailand) Malek Kiatsingnoi		Bangkok, Thailand	Decision	5	3:00
1980-08-07	Win	(Thailand) Tongjai Charoenmuang		Bangkok, Thailand	Decision	5	3:00
1980-07-15	Win	(Thailand) Daradej Kiatmuangtrang	Rajadamnern Stadium	Bangkok, Thailand	Decision	5	3:00
1980-06-02	Win	(Thailand) Wihoknoi Na Bankhot	Rajadamnern Stadium	Bangkok, Thailand	Decision	5	3:00
1980-04-07	Win	(Thailand) Kiattisak Kongkha		Bangkok, Thailand	Decision	5	3:00
1980-02-17	Win	(Thailand) Kiattisak Kongkha		Bangkok, Thailand	Decision	5	3:00
1979-12-12	Win	(Thailand) Daoloy Sor.Prasatsilp		Bangkok, Thailand	Decision	5	3:00
1979-11-22	Win	(Thailand) Weeranoi Sor.Benjaporn		Bangkok, Thailand	Decision	5	3:00
1979-11-05	Loss	(Thailand) Awut Sor.Thanikul		Bangkok, Thailand	Decision	5	3:00
1979-10-15	Win	(Thailand) Thongpoon Loyinyong	Rajadamnern Stadium	Bangkok, Thailand	Decision	5	3:00
1979-09-23	Win	(Thailand) Mekha Worawut	Rajadamnern Stadium	Bangkok, Thailand	Decision	5	3:00
1979-07-30	Loss	(Thailand) Kongsamut Sor.Thanikul	Rajadamnern Stadium	Bangkok, Thailand	Decision	5	3:00
1979-06-20	Loss	(Thailand) Claynoi Rsmjian		Bangkok, Thailand	Decision	5	3:00
1979-05-23	Win	(Thailand) Khatree Chuwattana		Bangkok, Thailand	Decision	5	3:00
1979-04-18	Win	(Thailand) Lertrit Kiatkriangnoi	Rajadamnern Stadium	Bangkok, Thailand	Decision	5	3:00
1979-03-21	Win	(Thailand) Lertrit Kiatkriangnoi	Rajadamnern Stadium - 8 Tukatathong Tournament, Final	Bangkok, Thailand	Decision	5	3:00
Wins the 8-Tukatathong Tournament title.
1979-02-16	Win	(Thailand) Saen Sor.Sakcharoen	Rajadamnern Stadium - 8 Tukatathong Tournament, Semifinals	Bangkok, Thailand	Decision	5	3:00
1979-01-21	Win	(Thailand) Yodrak Sitsoonchang	Rajadamnern Stadium - 8 Tukatathong Tournament, Quarterfinals	Bangkok, Thailand	Decision	5	3:00
1978-12-17	Loss	(Thailand) Lertrit Kiatkriangnoi		Bangkok, Thailand	Decision	5	3:00
1978-11-25	Win	(Thailand) Denudom Phet-Ubon		Bangkok, Thailand	Decision	5	3:00
1978-10-08	Win	(Thailand) Kumarnoi Pathumwadi		Bangkok, Thailand	Decision	5	3:00
Legend: Win Loss Draw/No contest Notes
