= Diosdado Gabi =

Filipino boxer (born 1979)

Personal information
- Nickname: Prince
- Nationality: (Philippines) Filipino
- Born: Diosdado Gabi; September 9, 1979 (age 46) Davao City, Philippines
- Height: 5 ft 2 in (1.57 m)
- Weight: Bantamweight

Boxing career
- Stance: Southpaw

Boxing record
- Total fights: 34
- Wins: 30
- Win by KO: 21
- Losses: 4
- Draws: 1

Diosdado Gabi, nicknamed Prince (born September 9, 1979 in Davao City, Philippines) is a retired Filipino professional boxer.

== Personal life ==
Gabi is married and has a young son that he left back in the Philippines to fight overseas in the United States. "We come from a very poor family. My father is a fisherman. All we eat sometimes is what he catches. I try to send them as much money as often as I can".

== Boxing career ==
=== Early career ===
On May 8, 2001, after building an undefeated record of 11–0, Gabi fought for the minor World Boxing Federation (WBF) super flyweight title against the then holder of the title, Samson Dutch Boy Gym (40–0) of Thailand. Gabi suffered his first loss as a professional, losing on points to Dutch Boy Gym, who later retired undefeated with a record of 43–0. After two wins following his loss to Dutch Boy Gym, he suffered yet another setback when he faced another undefeated Thai, Peesaddaeng Kiatsakthanee (11–0), whom he lost to by unanimous decision (UD) for the latter's WBC Asian Boxing Council Super Flyweight title.

Gabi won seven more bouts, and drew once (after his loss to Kiatsakthanee) before he was able to vie for the WBC International flyweight title, then held by compatriot, Randy Mangubat. Gabi won the belt by technical decision (TD) through twelve rounds, winning by scores of 116–111, 114–112, 116–110. After winning three more fights after his win against Mangubat, Gabi fought Eric Barcelona (whom he defeated six years ago, in 1999, in just his fourth pro fight). The result of the fight was just the same, Gabi defeated Barcelona by TD through 5 rounds, after an accidental headbutt caused the fight to be stopped.

=== First and Last World Title shot ===
On March 3, 2006, in Chumash Casino in Santa Ynez, California, in Gabi's second fight in the United States, he got his first (and last) shot at a world title. He fought the then undefeated IBO and IBF Flyweight World Champion, Vic Darchinyan (24–0). Unfortunately, Gabi was caught with a fierce left punch in the 8th round, resulting in an eight round technical knockout win for Darchinyan.

In an effort to help his fellow friend and fellow Filipino boxer Nonito Donaire prepare to fight Darchinyan, Gabi gave advice that the young fighter acknowledged after the bout. Donaire went on to knock out Darchinyan to become a unified world champion, something Gabi never accomplished, but he did help a friend, and that's what matters. Donaire said "Gabi taught me a little bit and told me what this guy (Darchinyan) did and he helped out a lot for this fight".

=== The Prince's Farewell ===
On March 15, 2008, after winning four more bouts after his loss to Darchinyan, Gabi faced the then WBO–NABO Bantamweight Champion, Abner Mares for his title in the undercard of Manny Pacquiao's rematch with Juan Manuel Márquez. Mares, who was undefeated coming into the bout with 15 wins and 0 losses, stopped Gabi in his tracks in just two rounds. Gabi later retired from the sport following the loss.

== Professional boxing record ==
35 fights	30 wins	4 losses
By knockout	21	2
By decision	9	2
Draws	1	

No.	Result	Record	Opponent	Type	Round, time	Date	Location	Notes
35	Loss	30–4–1	Abner Mares	TKO	2 (12), 0:49	15 Mar 2008	Mandalay Bay, Paradise, Nevada, U.S.	For WBO-NABO bantamweight title
34	Win	30–3–1	Jose Angel Beranza	UD	8	11 Aug 2007	ARCO Arena, Sacramento, California, U.S.	
33	Win	29–3–1	Antonio Maria Cochero Diaz	TKO	2 (8), 2:59	17 Mar 2007	Mandalay Bay, Paradise, Nevada, U.S.	
32	Win	28–3–1	Felipe Rivas	TKO	1 (8), 3:00	6 Oct 2006	Tucson Desert Diamond Casino, Tucson, Arizona, U.S.	
31	Win	27–3–1	Mauricio Pastrana	TKO	1 (8), 1:36	10 Aug 2006	The Orleans, Paradise, Nevada, U.S.	
30	Loss	26–3–1	Vic Darchinyan	TKO	8 (12), 2:42	3 Mar 2006	Chumash Casino Resort, Santa Ynez, California, U.S.	For IBF and IBO flyweight titles
29	Win	26–2–1	Jose Alfredo Tirado	TD	4 (10)	23 Sep 2005	Stockton Memorial Civic Auditorium, Stockton, California, U.S.	Fight stopped after Gabi suffers a cut on the upper left bridge of his nose from an intentional head-butt by Tirado
28	Win	25–2–1	Eric Barcelona	TD	5 (10)	10 Apr 2005	Almendras Gym, Davao City, Philippines	Unanimous TD; Fight was ordered to stop due to accidental head-butt in round 5
27	Win	24–2–1	Jimmy Pinontoan	KO	1 (10), 0:37	12 Feb 2005	Royal Mandaya Hotel, Davao City, Philippines	
26	Win	23–2–1	Saensak Singmanasak	KO	2 (10), 1:34	19 Dec 2004	Royal Mandaya Hotel, Davao City, Philippines	
25	Win	22–2–1	Sairung Singwancha	UD	10	10 Oct 2004	Antipas, Cotabato del Norte	
24	Win	21–2–1	Randy Mangubat	TD	12 (12), 1:50	9 Nov 2003	Cotabato Provincial Gymnasium, Barangay Amas, Kidapawan, Philippines	WBC International flyweight title at stake; Fight stopped due to a cut on Gabi's forehead produced from an accidental head-butt
23	Win	20–2–1	Roselito Campana	KO	3 (10)	14 Jun 2003	Kidapawan, Cotabato del Norte, Philippines	
22	Win	19–2–1	Alex Guevarra	TKO	3 (10), 0:53	23 Mar 2003	Cotabato Provincial Gymnasium, Barangay Amas, Kidapawan, Philippines	
21	Win	18–2–1	Joseph Paden	TKO	1 (10)	8 Dec 2002	Almendras Gym, Davao City, Philippines	
20	Win	17–2–1	Warlito Bartiquel	KO	1 (10), 2:32	23 Nov 2002	University of Mindanao Gymnasium, Tagum, Philippines	
19	Win	16–2–1	Leo Escobido	TKO	4 (10), 2:35	20 Oct 2002	Almendras Gym, Davao City, Philippines	
18	Win	15–2–1	Wito Ramirez	PTS	10	20 Sep 2002	Philippines	
17	Win	14–2–1	Rachman Kili Kili	TKO	1 (?)	26 Jul 2002	SCTV Studio, Jakarta, Indonesia	
16	Draw	13–2–1	Jimmy Pinontoan	PTS	8	13 Jun 2002	Jakarta, Indonesia	
15	Loss	13–2	Sot Sor Veerapol	UD	12	3 May 2002	Nonthaburi, Thailand	For ABCO super flyweight title
14	Win	13–1	Flash Murillo	UD	10	15 Dec 2001	Almendras Gym, Davao City, Philippines	
13	Win	12–1	Alfren Bulala	TKO	9 (12)	17 Nov 2001	Almendras Gym, Davao City, Philippines	
12	Loss	11–1	Samson Dutch Boy Gym	PTS	12	8 May 2001	Udon Thani, Thailand	For WBF (Federation) super flyweight title
11	Win	11–0	Felix Marfa	TKO	7 (?)	3 Mar 2001	Mandaue City Sports and Cultural Complex, Barangay Centro, Mandaue, Philippines	
10	Win	10–0	Sammy Sordilla	PTS	10	10 Feb 2001	Philippines	
9	Win	9–0	Sammy Sordilla	TKO	1 (?)	11 Nov 2000	Philippines	
8	Win	8–0	Rommel Libradilla	TKO	7 (10), 2:15	22 Sep 2000	Davao City, Davao del Sur, Philippines	
7	Win	7–0	Richard Cabillo	TKO	1 (?)	13 Aug 2000	Philippines	
6	Win	6–0	Roberto Oyan	TKO	1 (6)	6 Aug 2008	Davao del Norte, Philippines	
5	Win	5–0	Julius Jalnaiz	TKO	5 (?)	15 Jan 2000	Davao City, Davao del Sur, Philippines	
4	Win	4–0	Eric Barcelona	UD	6	14 Dec 1999	Plaridel, Bulacan, Philippines	
3	Win	3–0	Ricky Manatad	TKO	4 (6), 2:43	7 Dec 1999	Antipolo, Rizal, Philippines	
2	Win	2–0	Rey Arlos	TKO	3 (?)	2 Dec 1999	Philippines	
1	Win	1–0	Cec Aguilar	KO	1 (?)	5 Nov 1999	Philippines	

== Controversy ==
On August 17, 2007, Gabi was ordered arrested for breaching a contract with Cotabato Vice Governor, Emmanuel Piñol. MTC Judge Antonina Escovilla issued the warrant of arrest based on the complaint of Piñol who sought P4.8 million from Gabi.
