= Nongnarong Luksamrong =

Thai former professional Muay Thai fighter (born 1973)

- Born: Sanae Rukanna; November 9, 1973 (age 52); Chai Badan, Lopburi, Thailand
- Native name: นายเสน่ห์ รู้การนา
- Nickname: Raging River (แควเดือด)
- Division: Mini Flyweight; Light Flyweight; Flyweight; Super Flyweight
- Style: Muay Thai (Muay Bouk)
- Stance: Orthodox

Other information
- Occupation: Muay thai fighter (retired)

Sanae Rupanna (Thai: นายเสน่ห์ รู้ปานนา; born November 9, 1973), known professionally as Nongnarong Luksamrong (Thai: น้องณรงค์ ลูกสำรอง), is a Thai former professional Muay Thai fighter. He is a former three-time Lumpinee Stadium champion across two divisions who was active during the 1990s.

== Biography and career ==
He fought during the Golden Era of Muay Thai against many notable fighters including Karuhat Sor.Supawan, Samson Isaan, Hippy Singmanee, Thongchai Tor.Silachai, Chatchai Paiseetong, Nungubon Sitlerchai, Samkor Kiatmontep, Yokthai Sithoar, Hantalay Sor.Ploenchit, and Rotnarong Daopadriew.

== Titles and honours ==
- Lumpinee Stadium
  - 1992 Lumpinee Stadium Light Flyweight (108 lbs) Champion
  - 1994 Lumpinee Stadium Super Flyweight (115 lbs) Champion
  - 1996 Lumpinee Stadium Super Flyweight (115 lbs) Champion
- World Muay Thai Council
  - 1996 WMC World Super Flyweight (115 lbs) Champion

== Fight record ==
Muay Thai Record (Incomplete)
Date	Result	Opponent	Event	Location	Method	Round	Time
1999-03-16	Loss	(Thailand) Sakol Meenayothin	Lumpinee Stadium	Bangkok, Thailand	KO (Elbow)		
1999-02-	Win	(Thailand) Thoetthailek NakhonthongParkview		Thailand	Decision	5	3:00
1999-01-09	Draw	(Thailand) Kongkiat Sitchuntong	Lumpinee Stadium	Bangkok, Thailand	Decision	5	3:00
1998-06-07	Loss	(Thailand) Ekachai Or.Chaibadan		Chachoengsao, Thailand	Decision	5	3:00
1998-05-23	Loss	(Thailand) Phayaklek Sor.Charoensuk	Lumpinee Stadium	Bangkok, Thailand	Decision	5	3:00
1996-07-09	Loss	(Thailand) Hantalay Sor.Ploenchit	Lumpinee Stadium	Bangkok, Thailand	KO (Head kick)	2	
Loses the Lumpinee Stadium and WMC World 115 lbs titles.
1996-03-26	Win	(Thailand) Thongchai Tor.Silachai	Lumpinee Stadium	Bangkok, Thailand	Decision	5	3:00
Wins the vacant Lumpinee Stadium and WMC World 115 lbs titles.
1995-11-03	Loss	(Thailand) Petchsinil Sor.Ubonrat	Lumpinee Stadium	Bangkok, Thailand	Decision	5	3:00
1995-08-04	Loss	(Thailand) Petchsinil Sor.Ubonrat	Lumpinee Stadium	Bangkok, Thailand	Decision	5	3:00
1995-08-04	Loss	(Thailand) Thongchai Tor.Silachai	Lumpinee Stadium	Bangkok, Thailand	Decision	5	3:00
1995-06-09	Loss	(Thailand) Nungubon Sitlerchai	Lumpinee Stadium	Bangkok, Thailand	Decision	5	3:00
1995-05-15	Win	(Thailand) Rattanachai Wor.Walapon	Rajadamnern Stadium	Bangkok, Thailand	Decision	5	3:00
1995-04-04	Win	(Thailand) Duangsompong Por.Pongsawang	Lumpinee Stadium	Bangkok, Thailand	Decision	5	3:00
1994-12-09	Loss	(Thailand) Karuhat Sor.Supawan	Onesongchai, Lumpinee Stadium	Bangkok, Thailand	Decision	5	3:00
1994-11-15	Loss	(Thailand) Nungubon Sitlerchai	Lumpinee Stadium	Bangkok, Thailand	Decision	5	3:00
1994-10-28	Win	(Thailand) Nungubon Sitlerchai	Lumpinee Stadium	Bangkok, Thailand	Decision	5	3:00
1994-08-26	Loss	(Thailand) Chailek Sit Karuhat	Onesongchai, Lumpinee Stadium	Bangkok, Thailand	Decision	5	3:00
1994-07-19	Loss	(Thailand) Yokthai Sithoar	Lumpinee Stadium	Bangkok, Thailand	KO (Punches)	3	
Loses the Lumpinee Stadium Super Flyweight (115 lbs) title.
1994-06-10	Win	(Thailand) Yokthai Sithoar	Thahansuea, Lumpinee Stadium	Bangkok, Thailand	Decision	5	3:00
Wins the Lumpinee Stadium Super Flyweight (115 lbs) title.
1994-02-11	Win	(Thailand) Thongchai Tor.Silachai	Lumpinee Stadium	Bangkok, Thailand	Decision	5	3:00
1994-01-14	Win	(Thailand) Rittidet Sor.Ploenchit	Thahansuea, Lumpinee Stadium	Bangkok, Thailand	Decision	5	3:00
1993-10-18	Win	(Thailand) Silachai Vor.Preecha	Rajadamnern Stadium	Bangkok, Thailand	Decision	5	3:00
1993-09-17	Win	(Thailand) Wangthong Por.Pisitchet	Onesongchai, Lumpinee Stadium	Bangkok, Thailand	Decision	5	3:00
1993-08-25	Loss	(Thailand) Rotnarong Daopadriew	Lumpinee Stadium	Bangkok, Thailand	Decision	5	3:00
1993-08-06	Win	(Thailand) Chainoi Muangsurin	Lumpinee Stadium	Bangkok, Thailand	KO	2	
1993-06-08	Loss	(Thailand) Chatchai Paiseetong	Lumpinee Stadium	Bangkok, Thailand	Decision	5	3:00
1993-05-07	Loss	(Thailand) Rattanachai Wor.Walaphon	Onesongchai, Lumpinee Stadium	Bangkok, Thailand	Decision	5	3:00
1993-04-06	Loss	(Thailand) Thongchai Tor.Silachai	Lumpinee Stadium	Bangkok, Thailand	Decision	5	3:00
1993-02-09	Win	(Thailand) Wangthong Por.Pisichet	Lumpinee Stadium	Bangkok, Thailand	Decision	5	3:00
1992-10-27	Loss	(Thailand) Narunat Kiatpetch	Lumpinee Stadium	Bangkok, Thailand	Decision	5	3:00
1992-09-25	Win	(Thailand) Samkor Chor.Rachatasupak	Onesongchai, Lumpinee Stadium	Bangkok, Thailand	Decision	5	3:00
Wins the vacant Lumpinee Stadium Light Flyweight (108 lbs) title.
1992-08-25	Loss	(Thailand) Rotnarong Daopadriew	Lumpinee Stadium	Bangkok, Thailand	Decision	5	3:00
1992-07-31	Loss	(Thailand) Rotnarong Daopadriew	Daorung TV 7, Lumpinee Stadium	Bangkok, Thailand	Decision	5	3:00
1992-06-20	Win	(Thailand) Hippy Singmanee	Lumpinee Stadium	Bangkok, Thailand	Decision	5	3:00
1992-03-28	Win	(Thailand) Methanoi Sor.Maliwan	Lumpinee Stadium	Bangkok, Thailand	Decision	5	3:00
1992-02-21	Win	(Thailand) Hippy Singmanee	Lumpinee Stadium	Onesongchai, Bangkok, Thailand	Decision	5	3:00
1991-08-06	Loss	(Thailand) Rattanachai Wor.Walapon	Onesongchai, Lumpinee Stadium	Bangkok, Thailand	Decision	5	3:00
1991-03-29	Loss	(Thailand) Jompoplek Sor.Sumalee	Lumpinee Stadium	Bangkok, Thailand	Decision	5	3:00
1991-03-01	Win	(Thailand) Jompoplek Sor.Sumalee	Onesongchai, Lumpinee Stadium	Bangkok, Thailand	Decision	5	3:00
1991-01-21	Win	(Thailand) Den-aree Detpoltip	Kiatsingnoi, Rajadamnern Stadium	Bangkok, Thailand	Decision	5	3:00
1991-01-04	Win	(Thailand) Fakhamram Muangrayong	Lumpinee Stadium	Bangkok, Thailand	Decision	5	3:00
1990-12-18	Loss	(Thailand) Chingchai Sakdarun	Lumpinee Stadium	Bangkok, Thailand	Decision	5	3:00
1990-11-20	Loss	(Thailand) Singsamphan Kiatsingnoi	Onesongchai, Lumpinee Stadium	Bangkok, Thailand	Decision	5	3:00
1990-10-29	Draw	(Thailand) Singsamphan Kiatsingnoi	Rajadamnern Stadium	Bangkok, Thailand	Decision	5	3:00
1990-05-26		(Thailand) Khanunphet Johnny Gym	Lumpinee Stadium	Bangkok, Thailand			
1989-02-24	Loss	(Thailand) Saenmuangnoi Lukjaopormehasak	Lumpinee Stadium	Bangkok, Thailand	Decision	5	3:00
1989-02-10	Win	(Thailand) Roengrit Sor.Rachen	Lumpinee Stadium	Bangkok, Thailand	Decision	5	3:00
1989-01-08	Loss	(Thailand) Saenmuangnoi Lukjaopormehasak	Lumpinee Stadium	Bangkok, Thailand	KO	4	
1988-09-22	Loss	(Thailand) Rittidet Sor.Ploenchit		Nakhon Pathom, Thailand	Decision	5	3:00
Legend: Win Loss Draw/No contest Notes
