= Phannarai Netisri =

Thai German boxer

Personal information
- Nickname: The Diamond
- Nationality: German
- Born: 28 June 2000 (age 26) Bangkok, Thailand
- Weight: Super bantamweight

Boxing career
- Stance: Orthodox

Boxing record
- Total fights: 19
- Wins: 19
- Win by KO: 7
- Losses: 0

Phannarai Netisri (Thai: พรรณราย เนติศรี; born 28 June 2000) is a Thai-born German boxer fighting out of Schwabach, Bayern, Germany. As of 23 December 2024, she is the current WBF super bantamweight champion.

Phannarai Netisri grew up with her grandparents. She would later move to Germany along with her mother for a better life.

== Boxing career ==
Phannarai Netisri is currently undefeated as a professional boxer. As of 23 December 2024, she is the current WBF super bantamweight champion.

In 2019 Phannarai Netisri made her professional debut, aged just 19, and made an immediate impact in the sport, stopping fellow debutant Elizabeta Konaj in just 44 secords.

She also won the WBC youth world women title against Cheyenne Hanson on 11 December 2024, and the BDB title against Kim Angelina Jaeckel on 20 November 2024.

== Boxing record ==
19 fights	19 wins	0 losses
By knockout	7	0
By decision	12	0

No.	Result	Record	Opponent	Type	Round	Date	Location	Notes
19	Win	19–0	Lena Venjacob	TKO	(2)	May 1, 2026	St. Pauli, Grosse Freiheit 36	WBF
18	Win	18–0	Niorkis Carreno	UD	(10)	October 3, 2025	St. Pauli, Grosse Freiheit 36	WBF
17	Win	17–0	Isis Vargas Perez	UD	(10)	May 1, 2025	St. Pauli, Grosse Freiheit 36	WBF
16	Win	16–0	Milena Koleva	UD	(6)	February 22, 2025	Scharrena, Stuttgart, Germany	
15	Win	15–0	Maria Magdalena Rivera	UD	(10)	May 1, 2024	Grosse Freiheit 36, St. Pauli, Germany	WIBF and WBC Youth
14	Win	14–0	Danielle Bennett	UD	(10)	October 3, 2023	Grosse Freiheit 36, St. Pauli, Germany	WIBF and WBC Youth
13	Win	13–0	Hasna Tukic	TKO	2 (6)	April 30, 2023	Grosse Freiheit 36, St. Pauli, Germany	
12	Win	12–0	Ana Arrazola	UD	(10)	October 3, 2022	Grosse Freiheit 36, St. Pauli, Germany	WIBF
11	Win	11–0	Crystal Garcia Nova	RTD	5 (10)	May 29, 2022	CPI Box Club, Donauwoerth, Germany	WIBF (Vacant) and WBC Youth
10	Win	10–0	Nikola Hubálková	UD	(6)	November 28, 2021	CPI Box Club, Donauwoerth, Germany	
9	Win	9–0	Věra Kubíčková	UD	(6)	October 3, 2021	Grosse Freiheit 36, St. Pauli, Germany	
8	Win	8–0	Cheyenne Hanson	MD	(8)	June 19, 2021	Universum Gym, Hamburg, Germany	WBC Youth (Vacant)
7	Win	7–0	Kim Angelina Jaeckel	TKO	5 (10)	November 11, 2020	Universum Gym, Hamburg, Germany	DBD International (Vacant)
6	Win	6–0	Veronika Andrisiková	UD	(6)	July 11, 2020	Hospůdka Eden, Ústí nad Labem, Czech Republic	
5	Win	5–0	Eva Hrkotová	DQ	(4)	June 27, 2020	Hospůdka Eden, Ústí nad Labem, Czech Republic	
4	Win	4–0	Valeria Aletta Kovacs	TKO	1 (4)	November 23, 2019	Freiheitshalle, Hof, Germany	
3	Win	3–0	Manuela Zulj	TKO	1 (6)	October 6, 2019	Loewensaal, Nuremberg, Germany	
2	Win	2–0	Sanja Cebic	UD	(4)	October 6, 2019	Grosse Freiheit 36, St. Pauli, Germany	
1	Win	1–0	Elizabeta Konaj	TKO	1 (4)	July 6, 2019	Markgrafensaal, Schwabach, Germany	
