= Thailand Pinsinchai =

Thai Muay Thai fighter

- Born: Botool Saensawat; January 25, 1972 (age 54); Sakon Nakhon, Thailand
- Native name: โบตูล แสนสวาด
- Nickname: Killer Mole (ไฝเพชฌฆาต)
- Height: 1.68 m (5 ft 6 in)
- Division: Flyweight; Super Flyweight; Bantamweight; Super Bantamweight; Featherweight
- Style: Muay Thai (Muay Bouk)
- Stance: Southpaw
- Fighting out of: Bangkok, Thailand
- Team: Pinsinchai Gym

Kickboxing record
- Total: 221
- Wins: 161
- Losses: 53
- Draws: 7

Other information
- Occupation: Muay Thai trainer
- Notable relatives: Captainteam Adsanpatong (son)
- Notable students: Jigsaw SitThailand

Botool Saensawat (Thai: โบตูล แสนสวาด, born January 25, 1972), known professionally as Thailand Pinsinchai (Thai: ไทยแลนด์ ปิ่นสินชัย), is a Thai former professional Muay Thai fighter. He is a former Lumpinee Stadium, Rajadamnern Stadium, and Thailand champion at Bantamweight.

== Biography and career ==
Thailand started training in Muay Thai at the age of 9 in his native province. He later moved to the Pinsinchai Gym at the age of 17 in order to compete on the Bangkok circuit. He trained alongside other champions of the camp, Burklerk Pinsinchai, Saencherng Pinsinchai and Saenkeng Pinsinchai. He competed for the Aswindam promotion.

Thailand captured his first major title on June 21, 1995, when he defeated Sukhothai Taximeter by decision for the Rajadamnern Stadium Bantamweight title.

During his career Thailand defeated notable champions such as Hippy Singmanee and Nungubon Sitlerchai. On April 26, 2002, Thailand defeated Fahsuchon Sit-O for the Lumpinee Stadium and Thailand Bantamweight titles.

After retiring from competition, Thailand became a trainer in various camps such as FA Group, 13 Coins, PK Saenchai and Santai Muay Thai. He also held seminars all over the world. In 2019 he opened his own gym the "Sit-Thailand Muay Thai Gym" in Chiang Mai. He trains high level fighters of the Bangkok circuit including his own son CaptainTeam Adasanpatong and Rajadamnern Stadium champion Jigsaw SitThailand. The Sit-Thailand was elected camp of the year by the Petchyindee promotion in 2025.

== Titles and accomplishments ==
- Rajadamnern Stadium
  - 1995 Rajadamnern Stadium Bantamweight (118 lbs) Champion
- Lumpinee Stadium
  - 2002 Lumpinee Stadium Bantamweight (118 lbs) Champion
- Professional Boxing Association of Thailand (PAT)
  - 2002 Thailand Bantamweight (118 lbs) Champion

== Muay Thai record ==
Kickboxing record
161 Wins, 53 Losses, 7 Draws
Date	Result	Opponent	Event	Location	Method	Round	Time
2014-02-07	Win	(Thailand) Fahsuchon Sit-O	Lumpinee Stadium	Bangkok, Thailand	Decision	5	3:00
Wins 1 million baht side-bet.
2013-12-27	Win	(Thailand) Fahsuchon Sit-O	Lumpinee Stadium	Bangkok, Thailand	Decision	5	3:00
Wins 200,000 baht side-bet.
2013-05-10	Win	(Thailand) Jaroensap Kiatbanchong	Rajadamnern Stadium	Bangkok, Thailand	Decision	5	3:00
Wins 1 million baht side-bet.
2005-04-10	Draw	(Italy) Giorgio Petrosyan	Bologna Fight Night	Bologna, Italy	Decision	5	3:00
2004-09-24	Win	(Thailand) Kongdej Kiatpraphat	Pinsinchai, Lumpinee Stadium	Bangkok, Thailand	KO (Spinning back elbow)	3	
2004-07-27	Win	(Thailand) Sangarthit SasiprapaGym	Pinsinchai, Lumpinee Stadium	Bangkok, Thailand	Decision	5	3:00
2004-06-17	Loss	(Thailand) Lerdsila Chumpairtour	Daorungchujarean, Rajadamnern Stadium	Bangkok, Thailand	Decision	5	3:00
For the vacant Rajadamnern Stadium Super Bantamweight (122 lbs) title.
2004-03-18	Win	(Thailand) Dendanai Kiatsakkongka	Daorungchujarean + Charumueang, Rajadamnern Stadium	Bangkok, Thailand	KO	4	
2004-01-29	Draw	(Thailand) Dendanai Kiatsakkongka	Daorungchujarean, Rajadamnern Stadium	Bangkok, Thailand	Decision	5	3:00
2003-11-09	Win	(United Kingdom) Matthew Johnson	K-1 UK MAX 2003	Birmingham, England	TKO (Doctor Stoppage)	3	
2003-09-12	Win	(Thailand) Nungubon Sitlerchai	Pinsinchai, Lumpinee Stadium	Bangkok, Thailand	Decision	5	3:00
2003-08-14	Loss	(Thailand) Chaomailek Sor Thantawan	Daorungchujarean, Rajadamnern Stadium	Bangkok, Thailand	Decision	5	3:00
2003-03-31	Loss	(Thailand) Lerdsila Chumpairtour	Daorungchujarean, Rajadamnern Stadium	Bangkok, Thailand	Decision	5	3:00
2003-01-31	Loss	(Thailand) Petchmanee Phetsuphaphan	Lumpinee Stadium	Bangkok, Thailand	Decision	5	3:00
Loses the Lumpinee Stadium Bantamweight (118 lbs) title and the Thailand Bantamweight (118 lbs) title.
2002-12-	Win	(Thailand) Phetapee Chinnarong	Lumpinee Stadium	Bangkok, Thailand	KO	4	
2002-10-29	Draw	(Thailand) Phetapee Chinnarong	Pinsinchai, Lumpinee Stadium	Bangkok, Thailand	Decision	5	3:00
2002-09-20	Win	(Thailand) Yodradab Kiatphayathai	Pinsinchai, Lumpinee Stadium	Bangkok, Thailand	Decision	5	3:00
2002-07-14	Win	(Thailand) Denthoranee Nakhonthongparkview	Ladprao Stadium	Bangkok, Thailand	Decision	5	3:00
2002-04-26	Win	(Thailand) Fahsuchon Sit-O	Lumpinee Stadium	Bangkok, Thailand	Decision	5	3:00
Wins the Lumpinee Stadium Bantamweight (118 lbs) title and Thailand Bantamweight (118 lbs) title.
2002-03-08	Draw	(Thailand) Anuwat Kaewsamrit	Kiatpetch, Lumpinee Stadium	Bangkok, Thailand	Decision	5	3:00
2002-02-	Win	(Thailand) Denthoranee Nakhonthongparkview	Lumpinee Stadium	Bangkok, Thailand	TKO	3	
2002-01-	Win	(Thailand) Chanapet Wiriyaratchayothin	Lumpinee Stadium	Bangkok, Thailand	Decision	5	3:00
2001-11-30	Loss	(Thailand) Denthoranee Nakhonthongparkview	Kiatpetch, Lumpinee Stadium	Bangkok, Thailand	Decision	5	3:00
2001-02-25	Win	(Thailand) Rungrawee Sor.Ploenchit	Channel 7 Stadium	Bangkok, Thailand	TKO	4	
2000-12-15	Loss	(Thailand) Anuwat Kaewsamrit	Kiatpetch, Lumpinee Stadium	Bangkok, Thailand	Decision	5	3:00
2000-10-24	Loss	(Thailand) Sanghiran Lukbanyai	Lumpinee Stadium	Bangkok, Thailand	Decision	5	3:00
2000-05-23	Loss	(Thailand) Sanghiran Lukbanyai	Lumpinee Stadium	Bangkok, Thailand	Decision	5	3:00
1999-06-27	Win	(Thailand) Laemsing Por.Nitiwat	Channel 7 Stadium	Bangkok, Thailand	Decision	5	3:00
1999-05-25	Loss	(Thailand) Thananchai Nakornthongparkview	Lumpinee Stadium	Bangkok, Thailand	Decision	5	3:00
1998-10-16	Loss	(Thailand) Saksit Sit Or	Lumpinee Stadium	Bangkok, Thailand	Decision	5	3:00
1998-09-22	Win	(Thailand) Saksit Sit Or	Rajadamnern Stadium	Bangkok, Thailand	Decision	5	3:00
1998-05-07	Win	(Thailand) Pongpayak Thammakasem	Aswindam, Rangsit Stadium	Rangsit, Thailand	Decision	5	3:00
1998-03-26	Loss	(Thailand) Pongpayak Thammakasem	Rajadamnern Stadium	Bangkok, Thailand	Decision	5	3:00
1996-	Loss	(Thailand) Sukhothai Taximeter	Rajadamnern Stadium	Bangkok, Thailand	TKO	1	
Loses the Rajadamnern Stadium Bantamweight (118 lbs) title.
1996-	Loss	(Thailand) Sukhothai Taximeter	Rajadamnern Stadium	Bangkok, Thailand	Decision	5	3:00
1996-	Loss	(Thailand) Rotnarong Daopadriew	Aswin TPI Royal Cup Tournament, Semifinal - Rajadamnern Stadium	Bangkok, Thailand	Decision	5	3:00
1995-12-28	Loss	(Thailand) Pongpayak Thammakasem	Rajadamnern Stadium	Bangkok, Thailand	Decision	5	3:00
1995-06-21	Win	(Thailand) Sukhothai Taximeter	Aswindam, Rajadamnern Stadium	Bangkok, Thailand	Decision	5	3:00
Wins the Rajadamnern Stadium Bantamweight (118 lbs) title.
1995-03-27	Win	(Thailand) Rikangwon Sor.Thoranin		Bangkok, Thailand	Decision	5	3:00
1994-12-02	Win	(Thailand) Jaroensak Kiatnakornchon	Lumpinee Stadium	Bangkok, Thailand	Decision	5	3:00
1994-	Win	(Thailand) Chartchainoi Chaorai-Oi		Bangkok, Thailand	Decision	5	3:00
1994-07-18	Loss	(Thailand) Kasemlek QualityGym		Bangkok, Thailand	Decision	5	3:00
1994-04-07	Loss	(Thailand) Rotnarong Daopadriew	Aswindam, Rajadamnern Stadium	Bangkok, Thailand	Decision	5	3:00
1994-01-20	Loss	(Thailand) Langsuan Panyuthaphum	Rajadamnern Stadium	Bangkok, Thailand	Decision	5	3:00
1993-09-16	Win	(Thailand) Chaita Kiatchaiyong	Aswindam, Rajadamnern Stadium	Bangkok, Thailand	KO (Left High Kick)	2	0:28
1993-07-12	Loss	(Thailand) Rotnarong Daopadriew	Rajadamnern Stadium	Bangkok, Thailand	Decision	5	3:00
1993-05-20	Win	(Thailand) Dokmaifai Tor.Sittichai		Bangkok, Thailand	Decision	5	3:00
1992-11-26	Loss	(Thailand) Sibthit Lukbanyai	Rajadamnern Stadium	Bangkok, Thailand	Decision	5	3:00
1991-11-30	Win	(Thailand) Jaroensak Or.Nueangjamnong	Aswindam, Rajadamnern Stadium	Bangkok, Thailand	Decision	5	3:00
1991-	Win	(Thailand) Hippy Singmanee	Lumpinee Stadium	Bangkok, Thailand	Decision	5	3:00
1990-10-05	Loss	(Thailand) Pairojnoi Sor.Siamchai	Lumpinee Stadium	Bangkok, Thailand	Decision	5	3:00
1990-07-14	Draw	(Thailand) Kaew Kor.Pongkiat	Lumpinee Stadium	Bangkok, Thailand	Decision	5	3:00
1989-10-20	Win	(Thailand) Jaroensap Kiatbanchong	Onesongchai, Lumpinee Stadium	Bangkok, Thailand	Decision	5	3:00
1989-09-19	Loss	(Thailand) Saengdao Kiatanan	Lumpinee Stadium	Bangkok, Thailand	Decision	5	3:00
Legend: Win Loss Draw/No contest Notes

== See also ==
- List of male kickboxers
