= Rotnarong Daopadriew =

Thai former professional Muay Thai fighter

- Born: Pairoj Chansod; April 5, 1972 (age 54); Phutthaisong district, Buriram province, Thailand
- Other names: Rungroj Kiatnakhonbao(รุ่งโรจน์ เกียรตินครเบา); Rojanarong Daopaetriew; Rojnarong Tded99
- Nickname: The Face Kicker, The Master of Teeps (จอมถีบหน้า)
- Height: 163 cm (5 ft 4 in)
- Division: Mini Flyweight; Light Flyweight; Flyweight; Super Flyweight; Bantamweight
- Style: Muay Thai (Muay Femur)
- Stance: Orthodox
- Team: Sor Thanikul; Decharat
- Trainer: Ajarn Surat Sianglo; Han Silathong; Danchai Decharat

Other information
- Occupation: Police Sergeant; Muay Thai trainer

Pairoj Chansod (Thai: ไพโรจน์ จันทร์สด); known professionally as Rotnarong Daopadriew (Thai: โรจน์ณรงค์ ดาวแปดริ้ว), is a Thai former professional Muay Thai fighter.

== Biography and career ==
Pairoj Chansod was born on April 5, 1972 in the Buriram province. He fought around 40 times in his hometown of Phutthaisong and around the province under the name Rungroj Kiatnakhonbao. After moving to Bangkok, he stayed at the major "Sor Thanikul" camp for two months. Unable to fight because he weighed less than 100 pounds he returned home and was brought by Danchai Decharat to Ajarn Surat Sianglo at the Decharat camp where he would train for the rest of his career.

Rotnarong became a successful fighter during the Golden era of Muay Thai in the 1990s, capturing the Rajadamnern Stadium Bantamweight (118 lbs) title in 1994 and successfully defended it on November 30, 1994, against Burklerk Pinsinchai. Rotnarong defeated many notable champions of his era such as Meechok Sor.Ploenchit.Nongnarong Luksamrong, Jaroensak Kiatnakornchon, Thailand Pinsinchai, Kompayak Singmanee Orono Wor Petchpun and his main rival Sukhothai TaxiMeter who he faced nine times. Lauded for his fun and spectacular style, Rotnarong is credited as the first user of the technique now known as the "Saenchai kick" in the Muay Thai stadiums of Bangkok, first throwing it in 1993. His formidable use of front kicks granted him the nickname of Master of Teeps (จอมถีบหน้า).

In 1994 Rotnarong engaged in the Royal Cup Tournament and reached the final happening on February 24, 1995, where he defeated Kasemlek Kiatsiri by decision at the Rajadamnern Stadium. He received the royal trophy from the hands of Princess Maha Chakri Sirindhorn. Rotnarong won the tournament again the next year and was awarded a position in the Royal Thai police for him to take on after his fighting career.

After retiring from high level competition Rotnarong went back to being a police officer in his native province. He still finds time to train and help the youth of his area while working as a trainer in multiple gyms including the Wor.Watthana. Rotnarong still occasionally competes in Muay Thai for special events. On August 11, 2017, he faced former champion Orono Por.MuangUbon at the Lumpinee Stadium with a side-bet of a million baht He lost the fight by decision.

== Titles & honours ==
- Rajadamnern Stadium
  - 1994 Rajadamnern Stadium Bantamweight (118 lbs) title
    - One successful title defense
  - 1995 TPI Royal Cup 118 lbs Tournament Winner
  - 1996 TPI Royal Cup 118 lbs Tournament Winner

== Fight record ==
Muay Thai Record
Date	Result	Opponent	Event	Location	Method	Round	Time
2024-01-20	Win	(Thailand) Boonlai Sor.Thanikul	Wor. Watthana Muay Ying	Buriram province, Thailand	KO (Sweep)	2	
2020-12-21	Win	(Thailand) Lukbon Kaikaphetsapai	Charity event WanPonMaiMahaKusol	Chumpon province, Thailand	KO (Body kick)	4	
Wins 1 million baht side-bet.
2017-08-11	Loss	(Thailand) Orono Por.MuangUbon	Ruamponkon Paedriew, Lumpinee Stadium	Bangkok, Thailand	Decision	5	3:00
For a 1 million baht side-bet.
2017-01-22	Win	(Thailand) Granprixnoi Muangchaiyaphum	Wor.Watthana, Krabuengnok Stadium	Korat, Thailand	Decision	5	3:00
2016-06-22	Loss	(Thailand) Nadinoi Por.Kiatgym	Wanpitisak + Isan Muay Thai	Roi Et province, Thailand	Decision	5	3:00
For a 400,000 baht side-bet.
2012-12-07	Loss	(Thailand) Kanokrat Sor.Tienpo	Lumpinee Stadium	Bangkok, Thailand	Decision	5	3:00
2000-03-12	Win	(Thailand) Phalangphet Chor.Muanglopburi		Lopburi province, Thailand	Decision	5	3:00
1998-08-01	Draw	(Thailand) Petchnamnueng Por.Chatchai	Omnoi Stadium	Samut Sakhon, Thailand	Decision	5	3:00
1997-11-27	Loss	(Thailand) Orono Sitjepayao	Rajadamnern Stadium	Bangkok, Thailand	Decision	5	3:00
1997-05-17	Win	(Thailand) Orono Sitjepayao	Aswindam, Rajadamnern Stadium	Bangkok, Thailand	Decision	5	3:00
1997-04-10	Win	(Thailand) Palangpetch Sor.Sritong	Aswindam, Rajadamnern Stadium	Bangkok, Thailand	Decision	5	3:00
1996-	Win	(Thailand) Dennopphakhun Sor.Santiphap	Rajadamnern Stadium	Bangkok, Thailand	Decision	5	3:00
1996-08-26	Win	(Thailand) Saenthanong Lukbanyai	Aswindam, Rajadamnern Stadium	Bangkok, Thailand	Decision	5	3:00
1996- 07-22	Win	(Thailand) Saenthanong Lukbanyai	Aswindam, Rajadamnern Stadium	Bangkok, Thailand	Decision	5	3:00
1996-06-06	Win	(Thailand) Sukhothai TaxiMeter	Aswin TPI Royal Cup Tournament, Final - Rajadamnern Stadium	Bangkok, Thailand	Decision	5	3:00
Wins the Aswin TPI Royal Cup 118 lbs Tournament.
1996-04-11	Win	Thailand Pinsinchai	Aswin TPI Royal Cup Tournament, Semifinals - Rajadamnern Stadium	Bangkok, Thailand	Decision	5	3:00
1996-01-11	Win	(Thailand) Weerachat Reumkarnchang	Aswindam, Garden Hill	Phetchabun province, Thailand	Decision	5	3:00
1995-11-30	Win	(Thailand) Sukhothai TaxiMeter	Rajadamnern Stadium	Bangkok, Thailand	Decision	5	3:00
1995-11-03	Loss	(Thailand) Phetsinil Sor.Ubonrat	Onesongchai, Lumpinee Stadium	Bangkok, Thailand	Decision	5	3:00
1995-10-12	Win	(Thailand) Kasemlek Kiatsiri	Aswindam, Rajadamnern Stadium	Bangkok, Thailand	Decision	5	3:00
1995-05-29	Loss	(Thailand) Sukhothai TaxiMeter	Rajadamnern Stadium	Bangkok, Thailand	Decision	5	3:00
Loses the Rajadamnern Stadium Bantamweight (118 lbs) title.
1995-02-24	Win	(Thailand) Kasemlek Kiatsiri	Aswin TPI Royal Cup Tournament, Final, Rajadamnern Stadium	Bangkok, Thailand	Decision	5	3:00
Wins the Aswin TPI Royal Cup 118 lbs Tournament.
1995-01-	Win	(Thailand) Sibthit Lukbanyai	Aswin TPI Royal Cup Tournament, Semifinals - Rajadamnern Stadium	Bangkok, Thailand	Decision	5	3:00
1994-11-30	Win	(Thailand) Burklerk Pinsinchai	Aswindam, Rajadamnern Stadium	Bangkok, Thailand	KO (Right cross)	1	
Defends the Rajadamnern Stadium Bantamweight (118 lbs) title.
1994-10-	Win	(Thailand) Jaroensak Kiatnakornchon		Thailand	Decision	5	3:00
1994-09-	Loss	(Thailand) Thewaritnoi Chumpornpitak	Rajadamnern Stadium	Bangkok, Thailand	Decision	5	3:00
1994-08-11	Win	(Thailand) Sukhothai TaxiMeter	Aswin TPI Royal Cup Tournament, Rajadamnern Stadium	Bangkok, Thailand	Decision	5	3:00
Wins the Rajadamnern Stadium Bantamweight (118 lbs) title.
1994-07-18	Win	(Thailand) Jaroensak Kiatnakornchon	Rangsit Stadium	Rangsit, Thailand	Decision	5	3:00
1994-06-22	Loss	(Thailand) Sukhothai TaxiMeter	Rajadamnern Stadium	Bangkok, Thailand	Decision	5	3:00
1994-05-	Win	(Thailand) Sukhothai TaxiMeter		Bangkok, Thailand	Decision	5	3:00
1994-04-07	Win	Thailand Pinsinchai	Aswindam, Rajadamnern Stadium	Bangkok, Thailand	Decision	5	3:00
1994-03-	Win	(Thailand) Kaopong Pinsinchai	Rajadamnern Stadium	Bangkok, Thailand	Decision	5	3:00
1994-02-22	Win	(Thailand) Narunat Kiatkamthorn	Kiatpetch, Lumpinee Stadium	Bangkok, Thailand	Decision	5	3:00
1993-09-14	Loss	(Thailand) Saengmorakot Sor.Ploenchit	Daorung TV 7, Lumpinee Stadium		Decision	5	3:00
1993-08-25	Win	(Thailand) Nongnarong Luksamrong	Lumpinee Stadium	Bangkok, Thailand	Decision	5	3:00
1993-07-12	Win	Thailand Pinsinchai	Yod Nuam Tong + Aswindam, Rajadamnern Stadium	Bangkok, Thailand	Decision	5	3:00
1993-05-17	Win	(Thailand) Sukhothai TaxiMeter	Yod Nuam Tong + Aswindam, Rajadamnern Stadium	Bangkok, Thailand	Decision	5	3:00
1993-04-02	Loss	(Thailand) Jomhodlek Rattanachot	Wan Muay Chor.Por.Ror 7 + Petchyindee, Lumpinee Stadium	Bangkok, Thailand	Decision	5	3:00
1993-03-08	Win	(Thailand) Kaopong Pinsinchai	Rajadamnern Stadium	Bangkok, Thailand	Decision	5	3:00
1993-02-12	Win	(Thailand) Narunat Kiatpetch	Daorung TV 7, Lumpinee Stadium	Bangkok, Thailand	Decision	5	3:00
1993-01-11	Win	(Thailand) Kaopong Pinsinchai	Rajadamnern Stadium	Bangkok, Thailand	Decision	5	3:00
1992-09-25	Loss	(Thailand) Sukhothai TaxiMeter	Onesongchai, Lumpinee Stadium	Bangkok, Thailand	Decision	5	3:00
1992-08-25	Win	(Thailand) Nongnarong Luksamrong	Lumpinee Stadium	Bangkok, Thailand	Decision	5	3:00
1992-07-31	Win	(Thailand) Nongnarong Luksamrong	Daorung TV 7, Lumpinee Stadium	Bangkok, Thailand	Decision	5	3:00
1992-05-15	Win	(Thailand) Meechok Sor.Ploenchit	Lumpinee Stadium	Bangkok, Thailand	Decision	5	3:00
1992-03-27	Win	(Thailand) Kompayak Singmanee	Daorung TV 7, Lumpinee Stadium	Bangkok, Thailand	Decision	5	3:00
1992-01-17	Win	(Thailand) Rittidej Sor.Ploenchit	Thahansuea, Lumpinee Stadium	Bangkok, Thailand	Decision (Split)	5	3:00
1991-12-31	Win	(Thailand) Lukyod Sit Thiamchai	Daorung TV 7, Lumpinee Stadium	Bangkok, Thailand	Decision	5	3:00
1991-11-29	Loss	(Thailand) Denthaksin Sor.Suwannapakdee	Petchyindee, Lumpinee Stadium	Bangkok, Thailand	Decision	5	3:00
1991-10-22	Win	(Thailand) Payaklek Sor.Ploenjit	Lumpinee Stadium	Bangkok, Thailand	Decision	5	3:00
1991-10-08	Loss	(Thailand) Phongsak Lukbanyai	Channel 7	Bangkok, Thailand	Decision	5	3:00
1991-09-15	Win	(Thailand) Yutthahat Kiatsunanta	Channel 7	Bangkok, Thailand	Decision	5	3:00
1991-08-16	Loss	(Thailand) Payaklek Sor.Ploenjit	Lumpinee Stadium	Bangkok, Thailand	Decision	5	3:00
1991-07-19	Loss	(Thailand) Sibthit Lukbanyai	Rajadamnern Stadium	Bangkok, Thailand	Decision	5	3:00
1991-06-11	Win	(Thailand) Rungroj ThepAmnuaykhunsong	Lumpinee Stadium	Bangkok, Thailand	KO (High kick)	5	
1991-05-17	Win	(Thailand) Mongkolphet Tor.Anusorn	Thahansuea, Lumpinee Stadium	Bangkok, Thailand	Decision	5	3:00
1991-03-08	Win	(Thailand) Lukman Sitcho	Daorung TV 7, Lumpinee Stadium	Bangkok, Thailand	Decision	5	3:00
1991-01-22	Loss	(Thailand) Singdam Or.Ukrit	Daorung TV 7, Lumpinee Stadium	Bangkok, Thailand	Decision	5	3:00
1990-12-25	Win	(Thailand) Denchai Luksamprung	Thahansuea, Lumpinee Stadium	Bangkok, Thailand	Decision	5	3:00
1990-11-13	Loss	(Thailand) Singdam Or.Ukrit	Lumpinee Stadium	Bangkok, Thailand	Decision	5	3:00
1990-10-26	Win	(Thailand) Lukman Sitcho	Daorung, Lumpinee Stadium	Bangkok, Thailand	Decision	5	3:00
1990-08-07	Loss	(Thailand) Somdet Sit Or	Daorung TV 7 + Onesongchai, Lumpinee Stadium	Bangkok, Thailand	Decision	5	3:00
1990-07-03	Win	(Thailand) Sator Kiatwichian	Daorung TV 7, Lumpinee Stadium	Bangkok, Thailand	Decision	5	3:00
1990-06-01		(Thailand) Narunat Kiatpetch	Daorung, Lumpinee Stadium	Bangkok, Thailand			
1990-05-02	Win	(Thailand) Lert-Anan Phanyuthaphum	Yod Muay Thai Fight, Rajadamnern Stadium	Bangkok, Thailand	Decision	5	3:00
Legend: Win Loss Draw/No contest Notes
