= Samson Dutch Boy Gym =

Thai Muay Thai fighter and professional boxer

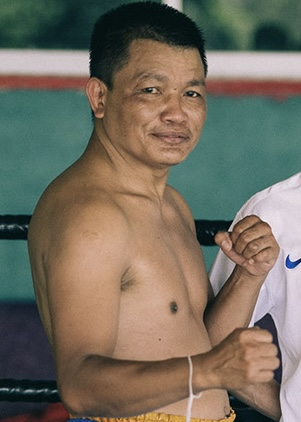
- Born: Somboon Pantasi; July 11, 1972 (age 54); Changhan, Roi Et Province, Thailand
- Native name: สมบุญ พานตะสี
- Other names: In Muay Thai: Ayjoy Sitsiansai; Saenmuangnoi Sitkruam; Saenmuangnoi Lukjaopormehasak; Samson Petchyindee; In boxing: Samson Krating Daeng Gym; Samson Elite Gym; Samson Dutch Boy Gym; Samson SamK Battery; Samson Toyota-Thailand
- Nickname: Samson Isaan
- Height: 163 cm (5 ft 4 in)
- Division: Mini Flyweight; Light Flyweight; Flyweight; Super Flyweight (Muay Thai & Boxing); Bantamweight
- Reach: 165 cm (65 in)
- Style: Muay Thai (Muay Bouk/Muay Khao) (1985–1994); Boxing (1992–2002)
- Stance: Southpaw
- Team: Sitkru-Am; Lukjaopormahesak
- Trainer: Pratan Chantaret (Sitkru-Am gym); Apisit and Tawat Petsanghan (Lukjaopormahesak gym)
- Years active: 1985–2017

Professional boxing record
- Total: 43
- Wins: 43
- By knockout: 36
- Losses: 0

Other information
- Occupation: Muay Thai trainer (formerly); Grocery store owner (formerly); Restaurateur; Taxi driver
- Spouse: Charipda Pantasi
- Children: Suchanya Pantasi (daughter)
- Boxing record from BoxRec

Somboon Pantasi (Thai: สมบุญ พานตะสี; born July 11, 1972), best known as Samson Isaan (Thai: แซมซั่น อีสาน), is a Thai former professional Muay Thai fighter and boxer. He is a former Lumpinee Stadium and Rajadamnern Stadium champion across two weight divisions, the 1991 Sports Writers Association of Thailand Fighter of the Year, and the 1994–2002 WBF Super Flyweight champion in boxing.

As a Muay Thai fighter, his official ring name was Saenmuangnoi Lukjaopormehasak (Thai: แสนเมืองน้อย ลูกเจ้าพ่อมเหศักดิ์) and as a boxer he was internationally known under the ring name of Samson Dutch Boy Gym (Thai: แซมซั่น ดัทช์บอยยิม).

== Early life ==
=== Childhood and beginning of Muay Thai career ===
Somboon Pantasi was born on July 11, 1972 in Changhan district, Roi Et province in the Isaan region. His father, Naipon, and his mother, Laem raised cows and farmed. He and his 8 siblings lived in poverty in Ban Bak in tambon Phak Waen. Laem died when Pantasi was 6 years old. After completing primary school, he could not continue his education since his family could not afford it. Since becoming a Muay Thai fighter was the only option he had to escape poverty, he started training at home and began his Muay Thai career at the age of 12 under the ring name of "Ayjoy Sitsiansai". After achieving a winning streak starting with his first fight, he joined the Sitkru-Am gym and began training under Pratan Chantaret. He then adopted the ring name of "Saenmuangnoi Sitkru-Am". He later transferred to and began living in the popular Lukjaopormehasak gym which was owned by Prisak "Pele" Inthapan. There, Pantasi would become a teammate of Yodkhunpon Sittraiphum and changed his ring name to "Saenmuangnoi Lukjaopormehasak". During his time fighting in the Isaan region, the only fighter who was able to beat Pantasi was Saenklai Sit Kru Od.

In the Lukjaopormehasak gym, Pantasi became more adept with pressure fighting and punching under Apisit Petsanghan and his kicking style was taught to him by Tawat Petsanghan. He would jog for 8-10 laps around the Bueng Planchai park every morning and again for 2 laps in the afternoon, totaling around 11–12 mi (18–20 km) every day. He would sleep at noon, resumed his training at 2 PM, and ended his training at 7 PM by throwing hundreds of knee strikes on punching bags. Pantasi ate all his meals in the Bandit restaurant owned by Khundaeng Inthapan, Prisak's wife. He helped run the restaurant when he was able. Onesongchai was Pantasi's first Muay Thai promotion. The promotion initially wanted him to take fights in Bangkok, but it was believed that Pantasi's short stature, dark skin, and facial features would prevent him from becoming popular in the capital city. The promotion instead had him take fights in the Samrong Stadium in the Bangkok Metropolitan Region where he would begin his rise to fame. His forward fighting style attracted high numbers of audiences and resulted in the nickname of "Samson Isaan" (translates to "Samson of Isaan") based on the biblical figure of the same name. This nickname has been anglicized in multiple ways such as "Samson E-sarn", "Samson Isan", "Samson Esarn", etc.

=== Rise to popularity in Bangkok ===
Pantasi was an orthodox fighter when he was younger but later switched to southpaw. Notably, he fought in an orthodox stance at 17-years-old for the 100 lbs (45.36 kg) Thailand title in 1989 against Rittidej Sor.Ploenchit. Pantasi eventually ran out of opponents in the Samrong Stadium, hence he started fighting for the Petchyindee promotion and began competing primarily in the Lumpinee Stadium in Bangkok. Due to his popularity, each of his fights produced around a million baht or more in profit for the stadium. From 1990–1992, Pantasi was earning between ฿100,000 to ฿250,000 (equivalent to ฿220,390 to ฿509,216 in 2020) per fight.

Pantasi was a Muay Bouk and Muay Khao hybrid fighter meaning that he was a pressure fighter who was also adept at knee fighting in the clinch. 1991 was the most significant period of Pantasi's career as he had 11 fights with no losses. Pantasi had what is considered to be one of the best fights in his career against Veeraphol Sahaprom with the Super Flyweight Muay Thai World title at stake. Pantasi knocked him out with punches. In his next fight, Pantasi would win the Lumpinee Bantamweight title against Saenklai Sit Kru Od by way of knockout. He was 19-years-old when he was awarded the 1991 Fighter of the Year Award by the Sports Writers Association of Thailand, the most prestigious Muay Thai accolade at the time.

1992 was also a significant year of Pantasi's Muay Thai career. He extended his win streak by beating Muay Bouk fighter Chartchainoi Chaorai-Oi. The streak was broken by Muay Khao fighter Langsuan Panyuthaphum; Pantasi was then awarded ฿270,000 (equivalent to ฿567,963 in 2020), the highest fight purse in his Muay Thai career despite losing. In between his 2 losses to Jaroensak Kiatnakornchon, Pantasi was able to beat knockout artist Lakhin Wassandasit who had just won the Isuzu tournament and was at his top form at the time. Taweesaklek Ploysakda had his final fight against Pantasi. In their bout, Taweesaklek's lingering injury on his left eye was aggravated and had to be treated by surgeries. He retired afterwards. Lakhin then had his rematch in August wherein he became the first person to knock down Pantasi. The third match between them had the Rajadamnern Super Flyweight title at stake; Pantasi won the fight by decision. He concluded his trilogy against Jaroensak by knocking him out.

=== Final Muay Thai fights before career switch ===
After starting 1993 by knocking out Kiewmorakot Praianan and beating Dara-ek Sitrungsap, he had a 4-fight losing streak, during which Veerapol became the first person to knock out Pantasi. Pantasi then went into a 4-fight win streak afterwards. For his final fight of that year, he and his opponent Detduang Por.Pongsawang were awarded the Lumpinee Stadium Fight of the Year award for their bout in December. Pantasi would only have 3 Muay Thai fights in 1994, retiring from the sport after losing to Dara-ek in May.

He and Saenklai Sit Kru Od were noted for their 11-fight rivalry that ended with Pantasi getting 5 wins and Saenklai getting 6. Pantasi was possibly matched up against Karuhat Sor.Supawan but the two never fought. His knockout victories against Veerapol and Pepsi Biyapan were considered to be the best fights in his Muay Thai career. He was 22-years-old when he switched to boxing.

== Boxing career ==
Shifting his focus to boxing, he changed his ring name to "Samson" which was previously a nickname but not his official ring name. As a boxer, he would also represent various Thailand-based companies in his ring name. Krating Daeng, (Note: While Krating Daeng translates to "Red Bull" and both produce similar products, they are separate companies.) 3K Battery (SamK Battery), Dutch Boy, and Toyota-Thailand either owned or sponsored boxing gyms which Pantasi represented. Within Thailand, his most referred-to boxing ring name was "Samson Krating Daeng Gym", meanwhile he was mainly referred to internationally as "Samson Dutch Boy Gym". Pantasi's first boxing fight was held in 1992, in the middle of his prime Muay Thai years. He would only resume boxing 2 months after his final Muay Thai fight in 1994.

In his 3rd professional boxing fight, Pantasi beat his first top opponent, Philippine champion Dan Nietes, by decision. He won the minor World Boxing Federation (WBF) World Super Flyweight title by TKO in September 1994 in his fourth boxing fight. He had his first title defense against Indonesian challenger Ippo Gala in 1994 in Chiang Rai on the undercard of Johnny Nelson vs. Nikolay Kulpin. In total, he had 38 consecutive defenses. Pantasi had most or all his boxing fights in the super flyweight division where it was difficult to find reputable opponents. He usually faced weaker boxers but also was able to beat some top opponents such as Cruz Carbajal, Hugo Rafael Soto, and Diosdado Gabi. He held his super flyweight title for 8 years. His boxing fights generated millions of baht in profit.

Pantasi was criticized for not competing in larger boxing organizations. The Petchyindee promotion had brought him to the United States to negotiate his fight under Don King and the president of the World Boxing Council (WBC) José Sulaimán, but the negotiations were unsuccessful. In 1998, Pantasi was involved in a car accident and had to get rib surgery afterward. Despite the injury, he continued defending his WBF belt and retired from boxing in 2002 with no losses. Pantasi's purses in professional boxing were the highest in his life, reaching around ฿1,000,000 per fight. He also received gold necklaces from each of his boxing sponsors. Upon finishing his combat sports career, it was rumored that he had over ฿20,000,000 in assets.

In the middle of his boxing career, Pantasi starred in a low-budget biographical film titled Leut Isaan (Blood of Isaan). In it, he played an interpretation of himself named Samson Leut Isaan. The film was shot over 3 days and was not released in theatres.

== Life after retirement from combat sports ==
Pantasi married his wife Charipda, a police officer, in around 1998. Their daughter, Suchanya Pantasi received her college degree from Srinakharinwirot University in 2021. Pantasi attempted to run a grocery store but was unsuccessful. As of 2017, he co-owns a restaurant with Charipda and drives taxis as a side job. He considers himself to be living a happy life.

=== Post-retirement Muay Thai fights ===
In late 2004, on the 48th anniversary of the Lumpinee Stadium, Pantasi participated in a Muay Thai fight against his role model "Rambo" Pongsiri Por.Ruamrudee. Pantasi and Veerapol had their 3rd fight in Rajadamnern Stadium on December 27, 2017 arranged by Petchyindee promotion. Both fighters received a fixed purse of ฿300,000. Before the fight, both men received the Best Boxer of the Country award by the Creative Media for Boxing in Thailand organization. Under the ring name of "Samson Petchyindee", he won by decision.

== Titles and accomplishments ==
=== Muay Thai ===
- Lumpinee Stadium
  - 1991 Lumpinee Stadium Bantamweight Champion
  - 1993 Lumpinee Stadium Fight of the Year (vs. Detduang Por.Pongsawang on December 10)
- Rajadamnern Stadium
  - 1992 Rajadamnern Stadium Super Flyweight Champion
- Sports Writers Association of Thailand
  - 1991 Sports Writers Association of Thailand Fighter of the Year

=== Boxing ===
- World Boxing Federation
  - 1994–2002 World Super Flyweight Champion (1 time, 38 defenses)
- Creative Media for Boxing in Thailand
  - Best Boxer of the Country (award shared with Veeraphol Sahaprom)

== Professional boxing record ==
43 fights	43 wins	0 losses
By knockout	36	0
By decision	7	0

No.	Result	Record	Opponent	Type	Round, time	Date	Location	Notes
43	Win	43–0	(Philippines) Alfren Bulala	UD	12	Apr 19 2002	(Thailand) Provincial Gymnasium, Khon Kaen	Retained World Boxing Federation super flyweight title
42	Win	42–0	(Philippines) Orlando Padillo	UD	12	Oct 26 2001	(Thailand) Indoor Basketball Gymnasium, Hat Yai	Retained World Boxing Federation super flyweight title
41	Win	41–0	(Philippines) Diosdado Gabi	PTS	12	May 8, 2001	(Thailand) Udon Thani	Retained World Boxing Federation super flyweight title
40	Win	40–0	(Philippines) Benjie Canete	TKO	6 (12)	Dec 29 2000	(Cambodia) Koh Kong Island	Retained World Boxing Federation super flyweight title
39	Win	39–0	(Philippines) Edgar Tahad	KO	3 (12)	Nov 3 2000	(Thailand) Lop Buri	Retained World Boxing Federation super flyweight title
38	Win	38–0	(Philippines) Roberto Moreno	KO	4 (12)	Aug 25 2000	(Thailand) Sakon Nakhon	Retained World Boxing Federation super flyweight title
37	Win	37–0	(Philippines) Raffy Aladi	TKO	8 (12)	Jul 1 2000	(Thailand) Nakhon Pathom	Retained World Boxing Federation super flyweight title
36	Win	36–0	(Philippines) Roberto Moreno	TD	11 (12)	Mar 17 2000	(Thailand) Roi Et	Retained World Boxing Federation super flyweight title
35	Win	35–0	(South Korea) Jin Ho Lee	TKO	1 (12)	Jan 29 2000	(Thailand) Bangkok	Retained World Boxing Federation super flyweight title
34	Win	34–0	(Russia) Ilshat Saitkulov	RTD	4 (12)	Nov 12 1999	(Thailand) Sara Buri	Retained World Boxing Federation super flyweight title
33	Win	33–0	(Philippines) Ariel Austria	TKO	4 (12)	Sep 17 1999	(Thailand) Pakpanang Memorial Stadium, Nakhon Si Thammarat	Retained World Boxing Federation super flyweight title
32	Win	32–0	(South Africa) Simphiwe Xabendlini	KO	4 (12)	Jul 23 1999	(Thailand) Yala	Retained World Boxing Federation super flyweight title
31	Win	31–0	(South Africa) Duncan Magubane	TKO	7 (12)	Apr 30 1999	(Thailand) Thung Song	Retained World Boxing Federation super flyweight title
30	Win	30–0	(Philippines) Andy Alagenio	KO	3 (12)	Feb 5 1999	(Thailand) Phatthalung	Retained World Boxing Federation super flyweight title
29	Win	29–0	(Philippines) Edward Escriber	TKO	7 (12)	Oct 23 1998	(Thailand) Sakon Nakhon	Retained World Boxing Federation super flyweight title
28	Win	28–0	(Philippines) Rey Llagas	TKO	7 (12)	Jul 30 1998	(Thailand) Bangkok	Retained World Boxing Federation super flyweight title
27	Win	27–0	(Philippines) Felix Marfa	KO	4 (12)	Feb 6 1998	(Thailand) Ratchadaphisek	Retained World Boxing Federation super flyweight title
26	Win	26–0	(South Korea) Jin Hyung Yuh	TKO	4 (12)	Nov 21 1997	(Thailand) Sawananan School, Sawankalok, Sukhothai	Retained World Boxing Federation super flyweight title
25	Win	25–0	(Philippines) Jess Maca	UD	12	Sep 26 1997	(Thailand) Provincial Stadium, Sara Buri	Retained World Boxing Federation super flyweight title
24	Win	24–0	(Argentina) Hugo Rafael Soto	KO	6 (12)	Jun 24 1997	(Thailand) Chaiyaphum	Retained World Boxing Federation super flyweight title
23	Win	23–0	(Philippines) Marlon Arlos	TKO	4 (12)	May 2, 1997	(Thailand) Ban Rai Temple, Nakhon Ratchasima	Retained World Boxing Federation super flyweight title
22	Win	22–0	(Mexico) Cruz Carbajal	KO	4 (12)	Mar 7 1997	(Thailand) Central Stadium, Loei	Retained World Boxing Federation super flyweight title
21	Win	21–0	(Philippines) Jess Maca	PTS	12	Jan 30 1997	(Thailand) Provincial Stadium, Chumphon	Retained World Boxing Federation super flyweight title
20	Win	20–0	(Russia) Alexander Makhmutov	RTD	6 (12)	Nov 22 1996	(Thailand) Provincial Stadium, Surin	Retained World Boxing Federation super flyweight title
19	Win	19–0	(South Africa) Sandile Sobandla	TKO	4 (12)	Oct 4 1996	(Thailand) Provincial Stadium, Roi Et	Retained World Boxing Federation super flyweight title
18	Win	18–0	(Mexico) Diego Andrade	TKO	6 (12)	Aug 23 1996	(Thailand) Provincial Stadium, Surat Thani	Retained World Boxing Federation super flyweight title
17	Win	17–0	(Philippines) Ricky Sales	TKO	3 (12)	Jul 11 1996	(Thailand) Kalasin	Retained World Boxing Federation super flyweight title
16	Win	16–0	(Mexico) Francisco Montiel	KO	2 (12)	May 24, 1996	(Thailand) Vichean Buri, Phetchabun	Retained World Boxing Federation super flyweight title
15	Win	15–0	(Mexico) Sergio Sanchez	TKO	2 (?)	Apr 15 1996	(United States) Greater Western Forum, Inglewood	
14	Win	14–0	(Dominican Republic) Luis Sosa	KO	1 (12)	Apr 4 1996	(Thailand) Koompavapi School, Udon Thani	Retained World Boxing Federation super flyweight title
13	Win	13–0	(Mexico) Genaro Garcia	TKO	7 (12)	Feb 17 1996	(Thailand) Bangkok	Retained World Boxing Federation super flyweight title
12	Win	12–0	(South Africa) Thembinkosi Ntyinkala	TKO	9 (12)	Dec 22 1995	(Thailand) Sakon Nakhon	Retained World Boxing Federation super flyweight title
11	Win	11–0	(Dominican Republic) Luis Antonio Guzman	TKO	4 (12)	Nov 5 1995	(Thailand) Sara Buri	Retained World Boxing Federation super flyweight title
10	Win	10–0	(Mexico) Justo Zuniga	KO	2 (12)	Aug 27 1995	(Thailand) Rangsit	Retained World Boxing Federation super flyweight title
9	Win	9–0	(Italy) Massimo Spinelli	TKO	5 (12)	Jun 25 1995	(Thailand) Chiang Mai	Retained World Boxing Federation super flyweight title
8	Win	8–0	(South Africa) Ndoda Mayende	TKO	5 (12)	May 14, 1995	(Thailand) Bangkok	Retained World Boxing Federation super flyweight title
7	Win	7–0	(Russia) Maxim Pugachev	TKO	6 (12)	Mar 12 1995	(Thailand) Phitsanulok	Retained World Boxing Federation super flyweight title
6	Win	6–0	(Philippines) Rolando Pascua	KO	8 (12)	Jan 8 1995	(Thailand) Central Stadium, Phrae	Retained World Boxing Federation super flyweight title
5	Win	5–0	(Indonesia) Ippo Gala	TKO	5 (12)	Nov 5 1994	(Thailand) Provincial Stadium, Chiang Rai	Retained World Boxing Federation super flyweight title
4	Win	4–0	(Australia) Colin 'Kid' Nelson	TKO	3 (12)	Sep 17 1994	(Thailand) Elite Gym Spa Complex, Bangkok	Won vacant World Boxing Federation super flyweight title
3	Win	3–0	(Philippines) Dan Nietes	SD	10	Jun 26 1994	(Thailand) Omnoi Stadium, Samut Sakhon	
2	Win	2–0	(Philippines) Edwin Casano	KO	2 (?)	May 2, 1994	(Thailand) Elite Gym Spa Complex, Bangkok	
1	Win	1–0	(Philippines) Young Elmer	KO	1 (?)	Feb 16 1992	(Thailand) Samut Prakan	

== Muay Thai record ==
Muay Thai record
Date	Result	Opponent	Event	Location	Method	Round	Time
2017-12-17	Win	(Thailand) Veeraphol Sahaprom	Petchyindee, Rajadamnern Stadium	Bangkok, Thailand	Decision	5	3:00
2004-12-07	Draw	(Thailand) Pongsiri Por.Ruamrudee	48th Anniversary, Lumpinee Stadium	Bangkok, Thailand	Decision	5	3:00
1994-03-08	Loss	(Thailand) Dara-Ek Sitrungsap	Petchyindee, Lumpinee Stadium	Bangkok, Thailand	Decision (Unanimous)	5	3:00
1994-02-18	Win	(Thailand) Jomhodlek Rattanachot	Petchyindee, Lumpinee Stadium	Bangkok, Thailand	Decision (Unanimous)	5	3:00
1994-01-25	Loss	(Thailand) Saenklai SitKruOd	Petchyindee, Lumpinee Stadium	Bangkok, Thailand	Decision (Unanimous)	5	3:00
1993-12-10	Win	(Thailand) Detduang Por.Pongsawang	Petchyindee, Lumpinee Stadium	Bangkok, Thailand	Decision (Unanimous)	5	3:00
1993-11-12	Win	(Thailand) Duangsompong Por.Pongsawang	Petchyindee, Lumpinee Stadium	Bangkok, Thailand	Decision (Unanimous)	5	3:00
1993-10-20	Win	(Thailand) Jaoweha Looktapfah	Kiatphetnoi, Rajadamnern Stadium	Bangkok, Thailand	Decision (Unanimous)	5	3:00
1993-09-03	Win	(Thailand) Jomhodlek Rattanachot	Petchyindee, Lumpinee Stadium	Bangkok, Thailand	Decision (Unanimous)	5	3:00
1993-07-20	Loss	(Thailand) Dara-Ek Sitrungsap	Petchyindee, Lumpinee Stadium	Bangkok, Thailand	Decision (Unanimous)	5	3:00
1993-05-11	Loss	(Thailand) Veeraphol Sahaprom	Thahansuea, Lumpinee Stadium	Bangkok, Thailand	TKO (Right Cross)	2	
1993-04-02	Loss	(Thailand) Singdam Or.Ukrit	Jor.Por.Ror. 7 + Petchyindee, Lumpinee Stadium	Bangkok, Thailand	Decision (Unanimous)	5	3:00
1993-03-12	Loss	(Thailand) Saenklai SitKruOd	Jatuchok, Lumpinee Stadium	Bangkok, Thailand	Decision (Unanimous)	5	3:00
1993-02-19	Win	(Thailand) Dara-Ek Sitrungsap	Petchyindee, Lumpinee Stadium	Bangkok, Thailand	Decision (Unanimous)	5	3:00
1993-01-15	Win	(Thailand) Kiewmorakot Prainan	Petchyindee, Lumpinee Stadium	Bangkok, Thailand	KO (Left uppercut)	3	
1992-12-08	Win	(Thailand) Saenklai SitKruOd	36th Anniversary, Lumpinee Stadium	Bangkok, Thailand	Decision (Unanimous)	5	3:00
1992-10-30	Win	(Thailand) Jaroensak Kiatnakornchon	Petchyindee, Lumpinee Stadium	Bangkok, Thailand	TKO (Punches)	3	
1992-09-28	Win	(Thailand) Lakhin Wassandasit	Phetthongkham, Rajadamnern Stadium	Bangkok, Thailand	Decision (Unanimous)	5	3:00
Wins the Rajadamnern Stadium Super Flyweight (115 lbs) title.
1992-08-04	Loss	(Thailand) Lakhin Wassandasit	Petchyindee, Lumpinee Stadium	Bangkok, Thailand	Decision (Unanimous)	5	3:00
1992-06-26	Win	(Thailand) Taweesaklek Ploysakda	Petchyindee, Lumpinee Stadium	Bangkok, Thailand	TKO (Punches)	2	
1992-06-02	Loss	(Thailand) Jaroensak Kiatnakornchon	Petchyindee, Lumpinee Stadium	Bangkok, Thailand	Decision (Majority)	5	3:00
For the Lumpinee Stadium Bantamweight (118 lbs) title.
1992-04-29	Win	(Thailand) Lakhin Wassandasit	Palangnum, Rajadamnern Stadium	Bangkok, Thailand	Decision (Unanimous)	5	3:00
1992-03-31	Loss	(Thailand) Jaroensak Kiatnakornchon	Petchyindee, Lumpinee Stadium	Bangkok, Thailand	Decision (Unanimous)	5	3:00
Loses the Lumpinee Stadium Bantamweight (118 lbs) title.
1992-03-06	Loss	(Thailand) Langsuan Panyuthaphum	Petchyindee, Lumpinee Stadium	Bangkok, Thailand	Decision (Unanimous)	5	3:00
1992-01-24	Win	(Thailand) Chatchainoi Chaoraioi	Petchyindee, Lumpinee Stadium	Bangkok, Thailand	Decision (Unanimous)	5	3:00
1991-11-29	Win	(Thailand) Saenklai SitKruOd	Petchyindee, Lumpinee Stadium	Bangkok, Thailand	KO (Left uppercut)	2	
Wins the Lumpinee Stadium Bantamweight (118 lbs) title.
1991-10-30	Win	(Thailand) Veeraphol Sahaprom	Daorungchucharoen, Rajadamnern Stadium	Bangkok, Thailand	KO (Left cross)	2	
1991-09-20	Win	(Thailand) Saenklai SitKruOd	Petchyindee, Lumpinee Stadium	Bangkok, Thailand	Decision (Unanimous)	5	3:00
1991-08-28	Win	(Thailand) Thongchai Tor.Silachai	Anusornthiamboon, Rajadamnern Stadium	Bangkok, Thailand	Decision (Unanimous)	5	3:00
1991-07-23	Win	(Thailand) Graiwannoi SitKruOd	Petchyindee, Lumpinee Stadium	Bangkok, Thailand	KO (Knees & punches)	5	
1991-05-24	Win	(Thailand) Pepsi Biyapan	Petchyindee, Lumpinee Stadium	Bangkok, Thailand	KO (Left cross)	5	
1991-05-03	Draw	(Thailand) Pepsi Biyapan	Jatuchok, Lumpinee Stadium	Bangkok, Thailand	Decision (Unanimous)	5	3:00
1991-04-09	Draw	(Thailand) Pepsi Biyapan	Petchyindee, Lumpinee Stadium	Bangkok, Thailand	Decision (Unanimous)	5	3:00
1991-03-19	Win	(Thailand) Rittidet Sor.Ploenchit	Jor.Por.Ror. 7 + Petchyindee, Lumpinee Stadium	Bangkok, Thailand	Decision (Unanimous)	5	3:00
1991-02-08	Win	(Thailand) Dentaksin Kiatrattapon	Petchyindee, Lumpinee Stadium	Bangkok, Thailand	Decision (Unanimous)	5	3:00
1991-01-18	Win	(Thailand) Graiwannoi SitKruOd	Petchyindee, Lumpinee Stadium	Bangkok, Thailand	Decision (Unanimous)	5	3:00
1990-12-21	Win	(Thailand) Rittidet Sor.Ploenchit	Jatuchok, Lumpinee Stadium	Bangkok, Thailand	Decision	5	3:00
1990-11-28	Win	(Thailand) Chettha Kiatchayong	Rajadamnern Stadium	Bangkok, Thailand	Decision	5	3:00
1990-10-19	Loss	(Thailand) Saenklai SitKruOd	Petchyindee, Lumpinee Stadium	Bangkok, Thailand	Decision	5	3:00
1990-09-21	Loss	(Thailand) Saenklai SitKruOd	Jatuchok, Lumpinee Stadium	Bangkok, Thailand	Decision	5	3:00
1990-08-28	Win	(Thailand) Dentaksin Kiatrattapon	Petchyindee, Lumpinee Stadium	Bangkok, Thailand	Decision	5	3:00
1990-06-22	Win	(Thailand) Takrawlek Dejrath	Petchyindee, Lumpinee Stadium	Bangkok, Thailand	Decision (Unanimous)	5	3:00
1990-05-25	Loss	(Thailand) Dentaksin Kiatrattapon	Petchyindee, Lumpinee Stadium	Bangkok, Thailand	Decision (Unanimous)	5	3:00
1990-05-11	Win	(Thailand) Chalong Silpakorn	Petchyindee, Lumpinee Stadium	Bangkok, Thailand	Decision	5	3:00
Wins 200,000 baht side-bet.
1990-03-23	Win	(Thailand) Kiewmorakot Praianan	Petchyindee, Lumpinee Stadium	Bangkok, Thailand	Decision	5	3:00
Wins 400,000 baht side-bet.
1990-03-02	Win	(Thailand) Chettha Kiatchayong	WanmuayJorPorRor.7 + Petchyindee, Lumpinee Stadium	Bangkok, Thailand	Decision	5	3:00
1990-02-13	Win	(Thailand) Kiewmorakot Praianan	Petchyindee, Lumpinee Stadium	Bangkok, Thailand	Decision	5	3:00
1990-01-14	Win	(Thailand) Chalong Silpakorn	Lumpinee Stadium	Bangkok, Thailand	Decision	5	3:00
1989-12-26	Win	(Thailand) Saenklai SitKruOd	Lumpinee Stadium	Bangkok, Thailand	KO (Spinning elbow)	1	
1989-12-08	Win	(Thailand) Chalong Silpakorn	Petchyindee, Lumpinee Stadium	Bangkok, Thailand	Decision	5	3:00
Wins 400,000 baht side-bet.
1989-10-30	Win	(Thailand) Sornsuriya Sor.Singsuriya	Muayeksamrong, Chanthaburi Boxing Stadium	Chanthaburi, Thailand	Decision	5	3:00
1989-10-14	Win	(Thailand) Kiewmorakot Praianan	Lumpinee Stadium	Bangkok, Thailand	Decision	5	3:00
1989-09-10	Loss	(Thailand) Rittidet Sor.Ploenchit	Samrong Stadium	Samut Prakan, Thailand	Decision	5	3:00
For the Thailand 100 lbs title.
1989-08-13	Win	(Thailand) Sornsuriya Sor.Singsuriya	Lumpinee Stadium	Bangkok, Thailand	Decision	5	3:00
1989-06-30	Win	(Thailand) Grandprixnoi Muangchaiyapoom	Petchyindee, Lumpinee Stadium	Bangkok, Thailand	Decision	5	3:00
1989-06-06	Win	(Thailand) Denchai Looksamrong	Lumpinee Stadium	Bangkok, Thailand	Decision	5	3:00
1989-05-16	Win	(Thailand) Sangasak Lukborai	Petchyindee, Lumpinee Stadium	Bangkok, Thailand	Decision	5	3:00
1989-04-15	Win	(Thailand) Chanchainoi Sor.Inthapat		Thailand	Decision	5	3:00
1989-03-24	Win	(Thailand) Saenrak Kiat5K	Samrong Stadium	Samut Prakan, Thailand	KO	4	
1989-02-24	Win	(Thailand) Nongnarong Looksamrong	Petchyindee, Lumpinee Stadium	Bangkok, Thailand	Decision	5	3:00
1989-01-29	Win	(Thailand) Denchai Looksamrong	Samrong Stadium	Samut Prakan, Thailand	Decision	5	3:00
1989-01-08	Win	(Thailand) Nongnarong Looksamrong	Samrong Stadium	Samut Prakan, Thailand	KO	4	
1988-11-18	Loss	(Thailand) Rittidet Sor.Ploenchit	Wanmuangthong, Samrong Stadium	Samut Prakan, Thailand	Decision	5	3:00
1987-12-01	Win	(Thailand) Robert Kaennorasing	Roi Et Provincial Sports Association Stadium	Roi Et, Thailand	Decision	5	3:00
1987-09-14	Win	(Thailand) Chaowarit Sor.Rungnakhon	Roi Et Provincial Sports Association Stadium	Roi Et, Thailand	Decision	5	3:00
Legend: Win Loss Draw/No contest Notes
