= World Boxing Federation =

Professional boxing organization

- Abbreviation: WBF
- Formation: 1988
- Type: Non-profit institution
- Purpose: Boxing sanctioning organization
- Headquarters: Luxembourg
- Region served: Worldwide
- President: Howard Goldberg
- Website: www.worldboxingfederation.org

The World Boxing Federation (WBF) is an organization which sanctions professional boxing bouts. It was created in 1988.

== Information ==
The World Boxing Federation was originally established in 1988 by Larry Carrier, who was part owner of Bristol Motor Speedway in northeastern Tennessee .It elected a Latino as Vice President for the Puerto Rican Market. It was an expanded version of the American Pro Boxing Association. The original concept for the WBF was written on the back of a napkin as an alternative for boxing as Carrier felt there was a lack of vision in boxing. The WBF wanted to give overlooked fighters a chance and wanted to be a more affordable sanctioning body for aspiring promoters by only charging a $5,000 sanctioning fee. The WBF also sought to promote itself in an honest manner and help the sport. The promotion signed their first title fight in November 1990, when they organized a cruiserweight bout between Rickey Patkey and Joe Louis for December 7, 1990.

The WBF's titles were not initially recognized by the British Boxing Board of Control and had to wait until 1995 to achieve recognition. The company had 17 field offices outside of the US by 1995 and the company moved its headquarters to Las Vegas prior to 1998. Larry Carrier sold the WBF to Ron Scalf in June 1998. The organization closed in 2004 after losing a lawsuit and was revived in 2009. In 2022, the promotion announced that they would no longer sanction title fights with boxers with negative records in an effort to raise standards.

The organization has sanctioned matches on 6 of the 7 continents. The organization has three levels of champions including World champions, Intercontinental champions and International champions. The organization also sanctions women's boxing matches. The promotion also monitors its judges closely and feels integrity is its greatest asset.

The promotion also had their own magazine called, "Inside Boxing with the WBF".

== Current WBF World Champions ==
=== Men ===
As of 9 November 2026:

Weight class:	Champion:	Reign began:
Minimumweight	vacant	
Light flyweight	vacant	
Flyweight	vacant	
Super flyweight	vacant	
Bantamweight	vacant	
Super bantamweight	vacant	
Featherweight	vacant	
Super featherweight	vacant	
Lightweight	vacant	
Super lightweight	vacant	
Welterweight	Alexander Pavlov (GER)	May 1, 2026
Super welterweight	Denis Krieger (GER)	October 3, 2026
Middleweight	Viktor Temirov (KAZ)	February 7, 2026
Super middleweight	Michal Ryba (CZE)	June 27, 2026
Light heavyweight	Mobin Khahrazeh (AUT)	June 5, 2026
Cruiserweight	Łukasz Pławecki (POL)	May 23, 2026
Bridgerweight	Steve Robinson (GBR)	October 3, 2026
Heavyweight	vacant	

=== Women ===
As of 9 November 2026:

Weight class:	Champion:	Reign began:
Minimumweight	vacant	
Light flyweight	vacant	
Flyweight	vacant	
Super flyweight	Aisha Kamaleldin (EGY)	October 18, 2026
Bantamweight	Angelina Lukas (KAZ)	December 3, 2025
Super bantamweight	Phannarai Netisri (GER)	May 1, 2025
Featherweight	Sarah Liegmann (GER)	March 23, 2024
Super featherweight	Lara Ochmann (GER)	March 29, 2025
Lightweight	vacant	
Super lightweight	vacant	
Welterweight	Mikaela Laurén (SWE)	October 3, 2026
Super welterweight	vacant	
Middleweight	vacant	
Super middleweight	vacant	
Light heavyweight	vacant	
Cruiserweight	vacant	
Heavyweight	Claressa Shields (USA)	July 27, 2024

== Notable Past WBF champions ==
- Evander Holyfield, former Heavyweight champion
- Francois Botha, former Heavyweight champion
- Jimmy Thunder, former Heavyweight champion
- Johnny Nelson, former Heavyweight champion
- Adílson Rodrigues, former Heavyweight champion
- Bert Cooper, former Heavyweight champion
- Mike Bernardo, former Heavyweight champion
- Joe Bugner, former Heavyweight champion
- Roy Jones Jr., former Light Heavyweight champion
- Robin Reid, former Super Middleweight champion
- Carl Daniels, former Middlweight champion
- Juan Lazcano, former Lightweight champion
- Dimitry Salita, former Super Light champion
- Samson Dutch Boy Gym, former Junior Bantamweight champion
- Jesús Chong, former Junior Flyweight champion

== See also ==
- List of boxing organisations
- World Boxing Foundation
