= Ali Gunyar =

Dutch kickboxer

- Born: 22 September 1979 (age 47); Eindhoven, Netherlands
- Other names: Mafia
- Nationality: Turkish; Dutch
- Height: 1.80 m (5 ft 11 in)
- Weight: 72.5 kg (160 lb; 11.42 st)
- Division: Middleweight
- Style: Muay Thai, kickboxing
- Fighting out of: Eindhoven, Netherlands
- Team: Team Gunyar
- Trainer: Suleyman Gunyar
- Rank: Black belt in Kyokushin

Kickboxing record
- Total: 122
- Wins: 100
- By knockout: 28
- Losses: 20
- Draws: 1
- No contests: 1
- Last updated on: 2 December 2013

Ali Gunyar (born 22 September 1979 in Eindhoven) is a Turkish-Dutch middleweight Muay Thai kickboxer fighting out of Eindhoven, Netherlands for Team Gunyar, where he is trained by his brother Suleyman Gunyar. Ali is a four-time kickboxing and Muay Thai world champion, who has made appearances for the K-1 MAX, SuperLeague and It's Showtime organizations. As of 2011 Ali is the current W.I.P.U. "King of the Ring" super middleweight world champion in K-1 rules

== Biography and career ==
Growing up in his home town of Eindhoven, Ali started training in Kyokushin karate at the age of five with his older brother (and now trainer) Suleyman, taking up also Thai-boxing at the age of eight. As well as studying martial arts, the young Ali played youth football for PSV Eindhoven but would be unable to gain a pro-contract so re-focused on kickboxing. At the age of thirteen he took the Dutch youth title in 1992, along with friend and fellow gym member Yücel Fidan and would accumulate an impressive record of 47 wins with just one defeat at B-Klass and C-Klass level.

In 1996, aged seventeen, Ali made his A-Klass debut. He would go on to win his first major title the very year, defeating Oliver Winter to win the I.S.K.A. European title before winning the I.K.B.O. European title the following year. Between 1999 and 2002 Ali would win more honors, a Dutch national title (W.P.K.L) and two world titles; the I.M.T.F. against Mohamed Mustati and World Full Contact Association (W.F.C.A.) against Baker Barakat. He also became a trainer in 2000 at the Al-Fid Gym along with his brother Suleyman and Yücel Fidan, helping to teach young fighters as well as fight himself.

Ali made his K-1 MAX debut in 2006 when he was invited to take part in an elimination fight at the K-1 World MAX Open. He was denied his dream of a quarter final place at the final in Tokyo, losing by decision to first time K-1 MAX champion Albert Kraus. The very same year he also made his debut with (the now defunct) SuperLeague organization at their eight man middleweight tournament, held in Ali's homeland of Turkey. Ali did well in his quarter final match beating the experienced Muay Thai specialist Ole Laursen in the quarter-finals before losing to the organization's top fighter, Alviar Lima, by technical knockout due to a hand injury that left Ali unable to continue. Sandwiched between his appearances for two of kickboxing's top organizations, was a win against Jose Barradas to claim the Muay Thai version of the W.F.C.A. world title in his hometown of Eindhoven.

Since the end of 2006, Ali has had a number of fights in the Netherlands and abroad, winning the relatively unheard of. O.P.B.U. Europe-African title against the tough Moroccan pitbull Chahid Oulad El Hadj but losing title fights against Farid Villaume, Albert Kraus (rematch) and most recently against Mike Zambidis. He also made a brief return to K-1 MAX, losing to Leroy Kaestner in a failed bid at qualification for the final 16 stage of the 2009 K-1 World MAX final. In 2011 Ali won his fourth world title - winning the W.I.P.U. "King of the Ring" super middleweight belt beating former SuperLeague fighter Fadi Merza at the A-1 Combat World Cup in Eindhoven.

He defeated Grega Smole via unanimous decision at Enfusion Live 5 in Eindhoven, Netherlands on 11 May 2013 and became first Enfusion Live -75 kg World Champion. He lost the title at Enfusion Live 11 in London on 1 December 2013 to Michael Wakeling. In the third round Wakeling threw a spinning back fist and caught Ali on the jaw with his forearm, which caused Ali to refuse to fight anymore. Judges scored the fight with unanimous decision for Wakeling.

== Titles ==
- 2013 Enfusion Live -75 kg World Title
- 2011 W.I.P.U. "King of the Ring" K-1 Rules Super Middleweight world champion -75 kg
- 2008 O.P.B.U. K-1 Rules Euro-African champion -72.5 kg
- 2006 W.F.C.A. Muay Thai world champion -72.5 kg
- 2002 W.F.C.A. Full-Contact world champion -76.2 kg
- 2002 I.T.M.F. Muay Thai world champion -72.5 kg
- 1999 W.P.K.L. Muay Thai Dutch champion -79 kg
- 1998 I.K.B.O. Muay Thai European champion -76.2 kg
- 1997 I.S.K.A. Full-Contact European champion -79 kg

== Kickboxing record ==
Kickboxing record
100 wins (28 (T)KOs, 72 decisions), 20 losses, 1 draw, 1 no contest
Date	Result	Opponent	Event	Location	Method	Round	Time
2013-12-01	Loss	(England) Michael Wakeling	Enfusion Live 11	London, England	Decision (unanimous)	3	
Lost Enfusion Live -75 kg World Title.
2013-05-11	Win	(Slovenia) Grega Smole	Enfusion Live 5	Eindhoven, Netherlands	Decision	3	3:00
Wins vacant Enfusion Live -75 kg World Title.
2011-09-02	Loss	(Suriname) Marco Piqué	Muay Thai Premier League: Round 3	The Hague, Netherlands	Decision (unanimous)	5	3:00
2011-04-09	Win	(Austria) Fadi Merza	A1 World Combat Cup, Indoor Sportcentrum	Eindhoven, Netherlands	Decision (unanimous)	3	3:00
Wins W.I.P.U. "King of the Ring" K-1 Rules Super Middleweight World title -75 kg.
2011-03-12	Loss	(Greece) Mike Zambidis	Iron Challenge	Athens, Greece	Decision (unanimous)	5	3:00
Fight was for Zambidis's W.I.P.U. "King of the Ring" Oriental Rules Super Welterweight World title -70 kg.
2010-06-19	Win	(Belgium) Jan van Denderen	A-1 World Combat Cup	Eindhoven, Netherlands	Decision	3	3:00
2010-05-02	Loss	(Morocco) Khalid Bourdif	Next Generation Warriors 4	Utrecht, Netherlands	Decision	5	3:00
2010-02-27	Loss	(Morocco) L'houcine Ouzgni	Fight Club Amsterdam III	Amsterdam, Netherlands	KO (right cross)	2	
2009-11-20	Win	(South Africa) Virgil Kalakoda	War of the Worlds	Melbourne, Australia	Decision (unanimous)	3	3:00
2009-10-17	Win	(Morocco) Halim Issaoui	Ultimate Glory 11	Amsterdam, Netherlands	Decision	3	3:00
2009-06-13	Win	(Morocco) Tarik Slimani	Gentleman Fight Night Part 6	Tilburg, Netherlands	KO	1	
2009-05-16	Loss	(France) Farid Villaume	Légendes et Guerriers	Toulouse, France	Forfeit		
Fight was for vacant W.F.K.B. Muay Thai world title -72 kg.
2009-03-01	Loss	(Netherlands) Leroy Kaestner	K-1 World MAX 2009 Europe, Quarter-finals	Utrecht, Netherlands	Decision (unanimous)	3	3:00
2008-12-20	Win	(Thailand) Lamsongkram Chuwattana	Boxe-Thai Guinea tournament, Quarter-finals	Malabo, Equatorial Guinea	Disq. (elbow)		
Despite victory was cut from illegal elbow and was unable to continue in the tournament.
2008-10-31	Win	(Germany) Mark Vogel	Wuppertal Gentleman Fight Night	Wuppertal, Germany	Decision	3	3:00
2008-10-05	Win	(Morocco) Chahid Oulad El Hadj	Tough is not Enough	Rotterdam, Netherlands	Decision (unanimous)	3	3:00
Wins O.P.B.U. K-1 Rules Euro-African title -72.5 kg.
2008-05-24	Loss	(Netherlands) Albert Kraus	Gentleman Promotions Fightnight	Tilburg, Netherlands	KO (knee strike)	2	
Fight was for vacant W.I.P.U. "King Of The Ring" Muay Thai Super Welterweight world title -70 kg.
2008-03-24	Win	(Netherlands) William Diender	Born2Fight	Westervoort, Netherlands	Decision	5	3:00
2008-03-02	Win	(France) Farid Villaume	SLAMM "Nederland vs Thailand IV"	Almere, Netherlands	Decision	5	3:00
2007-12-?	Win	(France) Rachid Kabbouri	A1 Combat Cup	Mersin, Turkey	Ext.R decision (unanimous)	4	3:00
2007-11-24	NC	(Morocco) Faldir Chahbari	Shootboxing in the Autotron	Rosmalen, Netherlands	No contest	3	3:00
2007-05-04	Loss	(Suriname) Marco Piqué	Steko's Fight Night 24, Final	Pforzheim, Germany	Decision (unanimous)	3	3:00
Fight was for Kings of Kickboxing 2007 Pforzheim preliminary tournament title -75 kg. Fails to qualify for Kings of Kickboxing 2007 Final.
2007-04-05	Win	(France) Yohan Lidon	Steko's Fight Night 24, Semi-finals	Pforzheim, Germany	Decision (split)	3	3:00
2006-11-12	Loss	(Morocco) Faldir Chahbari	2H2H: Pride & Honor	Rotterdam, Netherlands	Decision (unanimous)	5	3:00
2006-09-24	Loss	(Cape Verde) Alviar Lima	SuperLeague Turkey 2005, Semi-finals	Istanbul, Turkey	TKO (corner stop)	2	
2006-09-24	Win	(Philippines) Ole Laursen	SuperLeague Turkey 2005, Quarter-finals	Istanbul, Turkey	Decision	3	3:00
2006-04-28	Win	(Japan) Akeomi Nitta	SNKA TITANS 3rd	Tokyo, Japan	Decision (majority)	5	3:00
2006-04-15	Win	(Portugal) Jose Barradas	Pro Kickboxing Europe	Eindhoven, Netherlands	Decision	5	3:00
Wins W.F.C.A. Muay Thai world title -72.5 kg.
2006-04-05	Loss	(Netherlands) Albert Kraus	K-1 World MAX 2006 Open	Tokyo, Japan	Decision (unanimous)	3	3:00
Fails to qualify for K-1 World MAX 2006 Final.
2005-06-12	Loss	(Turkey) Şahin Yakut	It's Showtime 2005 Amsterdam	Amsterdam, Netherlands	TKO (corner stop/low kicks)	4	
2005-04-30	Win	(Germany) Jamal Danache	Queens Fight Night Eindhoven	Eindhoven, Netherlands	TKO	2	
2005-03-19	Loss	(Armenia) Gago Drago	Gentleman's Promotion Gala	Tilburg, Netherlands	TKO (doc stop)	2	
2004-10-17	Win	(Netherlands) Benito Caupain	Battle of Zaandam	Zaandam, Netherlands	Decision	3	3:00
2004-01-25	Loss	(Armenia) Gago Drago	Thaiboxing & Freefight event in Alkmaar	Alkmaar, Netherlands	TKO	2	
2004-04-18	Loss	(Morocco) Youness El Mhassani	BIG BANG	Elst, Netherlands	Ext.R decision	4	3:00
2003-11-30	Win	(Suriname) Marco Piqué	Killerdome V	Amsterdam, Netherlands	Decision	5	3:00
2003-06-08	Draw	(Belarus) Denis Sharoykin	It's Showtime 2003 Amsterdam	Amsterdam, Netherlands	Decision draw	5	3:00
2003-04-12	Loss	(Netherlands) Chris van Venrooij	Magic Duo Part 3 Eindhoven	Eindhoven, Netherlands	Decision	5	3:00
2002-11-30	Loss	(Netherlands) Vincent Vielvoye	Gala in Rotterdam	Rotterdam, Netherlands	TKO (corner stop)	2	
2002-06-?	Win	(Syria) Baker Barakat					
Wins W.F.C.A. Full-Contact world title -76.2 kg.
2002-04-27	Win	(Morocco) Mohamed Mustati	Eindhoven Al-Fid Gym Gala	Eindhoven, Netherlands	Decision	5	3:00
Wins I.T.M.F. Muay Thai world title -72.5 kg.
2001-10-21	Loss	(Turkey) Şahin Yakut	It's Showtime - Original	Haarlem, Netherlands	TKO	3	
1999-04-?	Win	(Curaçao) Silvio Zimmerman		Netherlands			
Wins W.P.K.L. Muay Thai Dutch title -79 kg.
1998-05-?	Win	(Switzerland) Thomas Hladky					
Wins I.K.B.O. Muay Thai European title -76.2 kg.
1997-11-?	Win	(Germany) Oliver Winter					
Wins I.S.K.A. Full-Contact European title -79 kg.
Legend: Win Loss Draw/no contest Notes
