= Warren Stevelmans =

South African kickboxer

- Born: 16 May 1983 (age 43); Cape Town, South Africa
- Other names: Chaka Zulu
- Height: 1.72 m (5 ft 7 1/2 in)
- Weight: 70 kg (150 lb; 11 st)
- Division: Welterweight
- Reach: 68.0 in (173 cm)
- Style: Kickboxing
- Fighting out of: Amsterdam, Netherlands
- Team: Vos Gym
- Trainer: Ivan Hippolyte
- Years active: 2001–2017

Kickboxing record
- Total: 74
- Wins: 37
- By knockout: 14
- Losses: 34
- By knockout: 4
- Draws: 3
- Last updated on: 3 May 2014

Warren "Chaka Zulu" Stevelmans (born 16 May 1983) is a South African kickboxer, fighting out of Vos Gym in Amsterdam, Netherlands. He is the K-1 MAX Netherlands 2008 tournament champion.

== Biography and career ==
Despite being born in South Africa, Stevelmans has spent the bulk of his career fighting in the Netherlands. He began his career at C-Class level in 2001 and through 2001 to 2005 won a number of C and B-Class fights, culminating in winning his A-Class debut against Arian Vatniki in Maastricht, Netherlands. Stevelmans lost his next fight against Chris Ngimbi but then went on a winning streak throughout the rest of 2006 and in to the later stages of 2007 where he won his first title, defeating William Diender to claim the N.K.B.B. national title at 70 kg.

Stevelmans performances at domestic level gave him the chance to take his talents on to the world stage as he was invited by K-1 to participate in one of their regional qualifying tournaments at the K-1 MAX Netherlands 2008 held in Utrecht. Stevelmans was the victor at a very competitive tournament, defeating two time SuperLeague champion Alviar Lima in the quarter-finals, gaining revenge on Chris Ngimbi in the semis via TKO and beating Marco Piqué in the final to book his place at the K-1 Final 16 event. Stevelmans won his elimination fight in Hiroshima, Japan and advanced to the quarter-final stage at the K-1 World MAX Final 8. Unfortunately for Stevelmans he was paired up against two time K-1 MAX world champion Andy Souwer who proved too strong for him over three rounds.

After his exit from the 2008 K-1 World MAX Stevelmans has been inconsistent. He picked up a good victory against Alviar Lima but has struggled against world class opposition, losing fights to the likes of Giorgio Petrosyan, Albert Kraus and Mike Zambidis. At the start of 2011, Stevelmans returned to K-1 MAX entering the K-1 MAX Madrid 2011 tournament. He beat two Spanish opponents en route to the final but was unable to win the title, losing to his third Spanish opponent on the night in Rafi Zouheir, via decision over three rounds.

He defeated Hinata Watanabe via unanimous decision (30-28, 28–27 and 29–28) at Shootboxing 2012 – Act 4 on 17 September 2012 in Tokyo, Japan to qualify for the 2012 S-Cup.

He was expected to compete in the 2012 Thai Fight 70 kg tournament, fighting in the quarter-finals on 23 October 2012 in Bangkok. However, this did not happen for unknown reasons.

Replacing Yoshihiro Sato on short notice, he defeated Dzhabar Askerov via unanimous decision in a tournament reserve fight at Glory 3: Rome - 2012 Middleweight Slam Final 8 in Rome, Italy on 3 November 2012.

He was expected to compete at the Shoot Boxing World Tournament 2012 in Tokyo, Japan on 17 November 2012. However, he was unable to compete due to the tournament coming so soon after his bout with Askerov.

He beat Thai brawler Bovy Sor Udomson by way of majority decision at Shootboxing 2013 – Act 1 in Tokyo on 22 February 2013.

Stevelmans was scheduled to fight Johann Fauveau at Glory 5: London on 23 March 2013 in London, England. However, when Andy Ristie was unable to fight in the event's co-main event against Albert Kraus, Stevelmans took his place and lost by unanimous decision.

He was soundly beaten by Aikpracha Meenayothin, losing on points at MAX Muay Thai 2 in Pattaya, Thailand on 29 June 2013.

He lost to Chingiz Allazov by unanimous decision at Legend 2: Invasion in Moscow, Russia on 8 November 2013.

Replacing Shemsi Beqiri on short notice, Stevelmans lost to Ky Hollenbeck by unanimous decision in an ugly fight in the tournament reserve match at Glory 12: New York - Lightweight World Championship Tournament in New York City, New York on 23 November 2013.

He lost to Yuri Bessmertny by UD at Thai Boxe Mania in Turin, Italy on 25 January 2014.

He lost to Josh Jauncey via UD at Glory 16: Denver in Broomfield, Colorado, US on 3 April 2014.

== Titles ==
- 2011 K-1 MAX Madrid 2011 runner up −70 kg
- 2010 World Full Contact Association (W.F.C.A.) Thai-boxing middleweight world title −72.5 kg
- 2008 K-1 MAX Netherlands champion −70 kg
- 2006 N.K.B.B. Dutch national champion

== Kickboxing record ==
Kickboxing Record
59 Wins (16 (T)KO's), 34 Losses, 5 Draws
Date	Result	Opponent	Event	Location	Method	Round	Time
2017-06-24	Loss	(Iran) Masoud Minaei	Kunlun Fight 63	Sanya, China	Decision (Unanimous)	3	3:00
70kg Qualifying Tournament Group 12 – Semifinal B.
2017-04-23	Loss	(Netherlands) Redouan Daoudi	WFL – Champion vs. Champion	Almere, Netherlands	Decision	3	3:00
2016-10-21	Loss	(Russia) Stanislav Kazantsev	W5 CHOOSE THE WAY OF A CHAMPION	Moscow, Russia	Decision (Unanimous)	3	3:00
2016-10-08	Loss	(Republic of the Congo) Nayanesh Ayman	Enfusion Live 42	Madrid, Spain	Decision (Unanimous)	3	3:00
2016-06-25	Loss	(Albania) Florian Marku	Iron Challenge	Athens, Greece	KO	1	0:30
2016-06-05	Loss	(Thailand) Jomthong Chuwattana	Kunlun Fight 45	Chengdu, China	Decision (Unanimous)	3	3:00
Qualification tournament for 70 kg 16 man Tournament Group E Semi-final.
2016-04-16	Loss	(Spain) Jonay Risco	CAMPEONATO DE CANARIAS AMATEUR 2016	Spain	Decision (Unanimous)	3	3:00
2016-03-25	Draw	(Russia) Dzhabar Askerov	Kunlun Fight 40	Tongling, China	Extension round decision	4	3:00
2015-12-05	Loss	(Czech Republic) Martin Gaňo	GIBU Fight Night 2	Prague, Czech Republic	Decision	3	3:00
2015-10-24	Loss	(China) Dong Wenfei	WLF 2015	Hong Kong, China	Decision (unanimous)	3	3:00
2015-10-16	Loss	(Albania) Hysni Beqiri	ACB KB 3: Grand Prix Final	Sibiu, Romania	KO (left hook)	1	2:35
2015-08-22	Win	(China) Zhao Chunyang	WLF 2015	Xiamen, China	Decision (unanimous)	3	3:00
2014-10-11	Loss	(Ukraine) Enriko Gogokhia	W5 Grand Prix – Rematch	Moscow, Russia	Decision (unanimous)	3	3:00
2014-05-03	Loss	(Canada) Josh Jauncey	Glory 16: Denver	Broomfield, Colorado, US	Extension round decision (unanimous)	4	3:00
2014-01-25	Loss	(Belarus) Yuri Bessmertny	Thai Boxe Mania	Turin, Italy	Decision (unanimous)	3	3:00
2013-11-23	Loss	(United States) Ky Hollenbeck	Glory 12: New York	New York City, New York, US	Decision (unanimous)	3	3:00
Lightweight World Championship Tournament, Reserve Match.
2013-11-08	Loss	(Belarus) Chingiz Allazov	Legend 2: Invasion	Moscow, Russia	Decision (unanimous)	3	3:00
2013-06-29	Loss	(Thailand) Aikpracha Meenayothin	MAX Muay Thai 2	Pattaya, Thailand	Decision	3	3:00
2013-03-23	Loss	(Netherlands) Albert Kraus	Glory 5: London	London, England	Decision (unanimous)	3	3:00
2013-02-22	Win	(Thailand) Bovy Sor Udomson	Shootboxing 2013 – Act 1	Tokyo, Japan	Decision (majority)	3	3:00
2012-11-03	Win	(Russia) Dzhabar Askerov	Glory 3: Rome – 70 kg Slam Tournament, Reserve Bout	Rome, Italy	Decision (unanimous)	3	3:00
2012-09-17	Win	(Japan) Hinata Watanabe	Shootboxing 2012 – Act 4	Tokyo, Japan	Decision (Unanimous)	3	3:00
2012-09-01	Loss	(Germany) Denis Schneidmiller	Mix Fight Gala 13	Frankfurt, Germany	Decision	3	3:00
2012-05-26	Loss	(Sweden) Sanny Dahlbeck	Glory 1: Stockholm – 70 kg Slam Tournament, First Round	Stockholm, Sweden	Decision	3	3:00
2012-05-04	Loss	(Russia) Batu Khasikov	Battle in Kalmykia	Elista, Russia	Decision (Split)	3	3:00
2012-02-06	Win	(Japan) Hiroki Shishido	Shootboxing 2012 – Act 1	Tokyo, Japan	Decision (Unanimous)	5	3:00
2011-12-09	Win	(China) Wang Anying	GP di Roma 2011	Rome, Italy	KO	1	
2011-09-02	Loss	(Thailand) Buakaw Por. Pramuk	Muaythai Premier League: Round 1	Los Angeles, California, US	TKO (Referee stoppage)	4	
Fight was for WMC World Junior Middleweight title (−70kg).
2011-08-05	Win	(Brazil) Alex Oller	Night of the Gladiators	Paramaribo, Suriname	TKO(opgave)	2	3:00
2011-07-16	Win	(Spain) Zeben Diaz	Real Fighters gala	Málaga, Spain	KO	3	
2011-06-11	Draw	(Armenia) Armen Petrosyan	Kickboxing International	Rome, Italy	Decision Draw	3	3:00
2011-03-06	Win	(Morocco) Mohammed Medhar	It's Showtime Sporthallen Zuid	Amsterdam, Netherlands	TKO (Corner Stop)	3	
2011-01-08	Loss	(Spain) Rafi Zouheir	K-1 MAX Madrid 2011, Final	Madrid, Spain	Decision	3	3:00
Fight was for K-1 MAX Madrid 2011 tournament title −70 kg.
2011-01-08	Win	(Spain) Rafa del Toro	K-1 MAX Madrid 2011, Semi-finals	Madrid, Spain	Decision	3	3:00
2011-01-08	Win	(Spain) Jonay Risco	K-1 MAX Madrid 2011, Quarter-finals	Madrid, Spain	Decision	3	3:00
2010-12-18	Win	(Belgium) Kenneth van Eesvelde	Fightclub presents: It's Showtime 2010	Amsterdam, Netherlands	Decision	3	3:00
2010-04-10	Loss	(Morocco) Chahid Oulad El Hadj	Star Muaythai V	Maastricht, Netherlands	KO	2	
2010-03-20	Loss	(Greece) Mike Zambidis	Kickboxing Superstar XIX	Milan, Italy	Decision (Unanimous)	3	3:00
2010-03-07	Win	(Cape Verde) Alviar Lima	Time For Action presents: Team SuperPro 10 Year Anniversary	Nijmegen, Netherlands	Decision (Unanimous)	3	3:00
Wins Lima's W.F.C.A. Thai-boxing middleweight world title −72.5 kg.
2009-11-29	Loss	(Thailand) Saiyok Pumpanmuang	SLAMM "Nederland vs Thailand VI"	Almere, Netherlands	Decision (Unanimous)	5	3:00
2009-11-07	Win	(Germany) Mohammed Gur	Janus FightNight: Thai Boxe Last Challenge	Padua, Italy	TKO	2	
2009-05-30	Win	(Thailand) Samranchai 96Penang	Star Muaythai IV	Maastricht, Netherlands	Decision (Unanimous)	5	3:00
2009-03-28	Loss	(Thailand) Orono Wor Petchpun	Battle of Sweden	Stockholm, Sweden	Decision (Unanimous)	5	3:00
2009-01-24	Loss	(Netherlands) Albert Kraus	Beast of the East 2009	Zutphen, Netherlands	Decision	3	3:00
2008-11-29	Loss	(Italy) Giorgio Petrosyan	It's Showtime 2008 Eindhoven	Eindhoven, Netherlands	Decision (Unanimous)	3	3:00
2008-09-06	Win	(Canada) Shane Campbell	It's Showtime 2008 Alkmaar	Alkmaar, Netherlands	Decision	3	3:00
2008-07-07	Loss	(Netherlands) Andy Souwer	K-1 World MAX 2008 Final 8, Quarter-finals	Tokyo, Japan	Decision (Unanimous)	3	3:00
Fails to qualify for K-1 MAX 2008 Final.
2008-04-26	Loss	(Armenia) Gago Drago	K-1 World Grand Prix 2008 in Amsterdam, Super Fight	Amsterdam, Netherlands	Decision (Majority)	3	3:00
2008-04-09	Win	(Italy) Rosario Presti	K-1 World MAX 2008 Final 16	Hiroshima, Japan	KO (Left Knee Strike)	2	1:06
Qualifies for K-1 World MAX 2008 Final 8.
2008-02-17	Win	(Suriname) Marco Piqué	K-1 MAX Netherlands 2008, Final	Utrecht, Netherlands	Decision (Unanimous)	3	3:00
Qualifies for K-1 World MAX 2008 Final 16.
2008-02-17	Win	(Democratic Republic of the Congo) Chris Ngimbi	K-1 MAX Netherlands 2008, Semi-finals	Utrecht, Netherlands	TKO (Low Kicks)	2	1:48
2008-02-17	Win	(Cape Verde) Alviar Lima	K-1 MAX Netherlands 2008, Quarter-finals	Utrecht, Netherlands	Decision (Split)	3	3:00
2008-01-26	Draw	(Morocco) Chahid Oulad El Hadj	Beast of the East 2008	Zutphen, Netherlands	Decision Draw	3	3:00
2007-11-24	Win	(Netherlands) Benito Caupain	Rings Gala	Hilversum, Netherlands	Decision	5	3:00
2007-10-27	Loss	(Belgium) Kenneth van Eesvelde	One Night in Bangkok	Antwerp, Belgium	Decision	5	3:00
2007-09-23	Win	(Netherlands) William Diender	Rings Holland: Risky Business	Utrecht, Netherlands	TKO (Doctor Stoppage)	2	
Wins N.K.B.B. Dutch title −70 kg.
2007-06-08	Win	(Portugal) Vitor Seromenho	Gala dos Campeos	Lisbon, Portugal	TKO	1	
2007-05-06	Win	(Belgium) Jan van Denderen	SLAMM "Nederland vs Thailand III"	Haarlem, Netherlands	Decision	5	3:00
2007-03-25	Win	(Morocco) Yassine Lahmidi	Rings – "The Chosen Ones"	Utrecht, Netherlands	Decision	5	3:00
2007-02-27	Win	(Netherlands) Dave van de Bloeg	Beast of the East 2007	Zutphen, Netherlands	TKO	1	3:00
2006-12-03	Win	(Belgium) Marijn Geuens	2H2H Gala	Maastricht, Netherlands	KO (Punches)	1	1:19
2006-10-07	Win	(Netherlands) Mark Ollie	Muaythai All Style Gala Martial Arts part II	Leek, Netherlands	Decision (Unanimous)	5	3:00
2006-09-17	Win	(Turkey) Mesut Derin	Muay Thai Gala	Nijmegen, Netherlands	TKO		
2006-04-15	Loss	(Democratic Republic of the Congo) Chris Ngimbi	Al-Fid Thaibox Gala	Eindhoven, Netherlands	Decision	3	3:00
2005-12-17	Win	(Netherlands) Arian Vatniki	2H2H	Maastricht, Netherlands	Decision	5	3:00
2005-06-11	Win	(Morocco) Rastagar Berrouz	Gala Dokkum "Warriors of the North"	Dokkum, Netherlands	Decision	5	2:00
2005-03-13	Win	(Netherlands) Rafik Tahiri	Muay Thai Gala Odeon	Rotterdam, Netherlands	Decision	5	2:00
2004-11-13	Win	(Thailand) Ton Sansuek	Gala Sportlife	Heerlen, Netherlands	KO		
2003-02-15	Loss	(Morocco) Karim El Assati	Thaibox Gala Geeraets	Sevenum, Netherlands	Decision	5	2:00
2003-01-25	Win	(Netherlands) Micha Niedekker	Champions Gym Muay Thai Gala	Sittard, Netherlands	TKO (Corner Stoppage)	4	
2002-11-10	Win	(Netherlands) Micha Niedekker	Champions Gym Gala in Hanenhof	Geleen, Netherlands	Decision	3	2:00
2002-06-02	Win	(Netherlands) Edie Benton	Duran Ebren Promotion	Eindhoven, Netherlands	Decision (Unanimous)	3	2:00
2002-03-16	Loss	(Morocco) Mohamed Loukili	Theo van den Oever Promotion	Sint-Oedenrode, Netherlands	Decision	3	2:00
2001-09-22	Win	(Morocco) Mohamed El Hadouchi	Champions Gym Gala in Hanenhof	Geleen, Netherlands	Decision	3	2:00
Legend: Win Loss Draw/No contest Notes

== See also ==
- List of male kickboxers
- List of K-1 Events
