= Leroy Kaestner =

Dutch welterweight kickboxer

- Born: September 28, 1988 (age 38)
- Other names: Bamm Bamm
- Nationality: Dutch
- Height: 1.75 m (5 ft 9 in)
- Weight: 79 kg (174 lb; 12.4 st)
- Division: Welterweight
- Style: Kickboxing
- Fighting out of: house of champions Netherlands
- Team: house of champions
- Trainer: van Osch; Peter Koopman
- Years active: 6 (2004-present)

Kickboxing record
- Total: 45
- Wins: 36
- By knockout: 10
- Losses: 7
- By knockout: 0
- Draws: 2
- Last updated on: 21 Nov 2024

Leroy "Bamm Bamm" Kaestner (born September 28, 1988) is a Dutch welterweight kickboxer fighting out of house of Champions. He is the K-1 World MAX 2009 Europe Tournament champion currently competing in K-1 MAX.

== Career and biography ==
Kaestner idolized Peter Aerts and began training in kickboxing at the age of 10. After five years of fighting at smaller Dutch events, Leroy Kaestner made his K-1 debut at the K-1 World MAX 2009 Europe Tournament in Utrecht, Netherlands on March 1, 2009, becoming the surprise winner of the competition, beating Marco Pique in the final by unanimous decision. As a result of his victory Kaestner would qualify for the K-1 World MAX 2009 Final 16, losing by decision to eventual runner up Andy Souwer. Kaestner's performance against Souwer would lead to him being invited to the K-1 World MAX 2009 Final 8 as a reservist, although he would lose his bout to local fighter Yasuhiro Kido.

Since that tournament Leroy has continued his progress claiming a notable win over K-1 MAX finalist Gago Drago at It's Showtime 2010 Amsterdam. Despite this recent run of good form Kaestner was not re-invited back to the K-1 Max final in 2010. At the end of 2010, Kaestner won his second major title by defeating Cagri Ermis to win the W.F.C.A. European title -72.5 kg.

== Titles ==
- 2010 WFCA European Welterweight ( – 72.5 kg) champion
- 2009 WFCA Muay Thai European Junior Middleweight (-69.85) champion
- 2009 K-1 World MAX Europe Tournament champion

== Kickboxing record ==
Kickboxing Record
34 Wins (9 (T)KO's, 23 decisions), 7 Losses, 2 Draws
| Date | Result | Opponent | Event | Location | Method | Round | Time | Record |
| 2024-11-16 | Win | (Netherlands) Thomas Doeve | Enfusion #143 | Groningen, Netherlands | TKO | 2 | | 34-7-2 |
| 2016-04-11 | Loss | (Netherlands) Endy Semeleer | Battle Events | Arnhem, Netherlands | Ext. R. Decision (Unanimous) | 4 | | 33-7-2 |
| 2011-03-27 | Win | (Suriname) Marvin Sansaar | Battle in the Bhoele, Sporthal de Boeler | Eerbeek, Netherlands | KO | 1 | | 33-6-2 |
| 2011-03-06 | Win | (Morocco) Ramzi Tamaditi | It's Showtime Sporthallen Zuid | Amsterdam, Netherlands | Decision (Split) | 3 | 3:00 | 32-6-2 |
| 2010-12-04 | Loss | (Armenia) Armen Petrosyan | Janus Fight Night 2010 | Padua, Italy | Decision (Unanimous) | 3 | 3:00 | 31-6-2 |
| 2010-11-24 | Win | (Germany) Cagri Ermis | Thailand vs Challenger series "Thailand vs Germany" | Ulm, Germany | Decision (Unanimous) | 5 | 3:00 | 31-5-2 |
Wins WFCA European Welterweight ( – 72.5 kg) title.
| 2010-10-09 | Win | (Netherlands) Hakim Ait Hma | Ring Rage Part 5 | Assen, Netherlands | Decision | 3 | 3:00 | 30-5-1 |
| 2010-05-29 | Win | (Armenia) Gago Drago | It's Showtime 2010 Amsterdam | Amsterdam, Netherlands | Decision (4-1) | 3 | 3:00 | 29-5-2 |
| 2010-03-21 | Win | (Netherlands) Menno Dijkstra | K-1 World MAX 2010 West Europe, Super Fight | Utrecht, Netherlands | Decision (Unanimous) | 3 | 3:00 | 28-5-2 |
| 2010-01-30 | Loss | (Netherlands) Nieky Holzken | Beast of the East | Zutphen, Netherlands | Decision (Unanimous) | 3 | 3:00 | 27-5-2 |
| 2009-11-08 | Draw | (Morocco) Faldir Chahbari | Heroes Fight Event | Apeldoorn, Netherlands | Decision Draw | 3 | 3:00 | 27-4-2 |
| 2009-09-27 | Win | (Senegal) Otmar Diagne | Knock Out Combat 6 | Eindhoven, Netherlands | Decision (Unanimous) | 3 | 3:00 | 27-4-1 |
Wins WFCA Muay Thai Junior Middleweight European (-69.85) title.
| 2009-08-08 | Win | (Suriname) Andy Ristie | Slamm!! Soema Na Basi IV | Paramaribo, Suriname | Decision (unanimous) | 3 | 3:00 | 26-4-1 |
| 2009-07-13 | Loss | (Japan) Yasuhiro Kido | K-1 World MAX 2009 Final 8, Reserve Fight | Tokyo, Japan | Decision (Unanimous) | 3 | 3:00 | 25-4-1 |
| 2009-04-21 | Loss | (Netherlands) Andy Souwer | K-1 World MAX 2009 Final 16 | Fukuoka, Japan | Decision (Unanimous) | 3 | 3:00 | 25-3-1 |
Fails to qualify for K-1 World MAX 2009 Final 8 but will later be invited to the event for a Reserve Fight.
| 2009-03-01 | Win | (Suriname) Marco Pique | K-1 World MAX 2009 Europe, Final | Utrecht, Netherlands | Decision (Unanimous) | 3 | 3:00 | 25-2-1 |
Wins K-1 World MAX 2009 Europe Tournament and qualifies for K-1 World MAX 2009 Final 16.
| 2009-03-01 | Win | (Morocco) Mohammed Rahhoui | K-1 World MAX 2009 Europe, Semi Finals | Utrecht, Netherlands | Decision (Unanimous) | 3 | 3:00 | 24-2-1 |
| 2009-03-01 | Win | (Turkey) Ali Gunyar | K-1 World MAX 2009 Europe, Quarter Finals | Utrecht, Netherlands | Decision (Unanimous) | 3 | 3:00 | 23-2-1 |
| 2008-11-23 | Loss | (Morocco) Mohammed el Atmani | Victory or Hell Gala | Netherlands | Decision (Unanimous) | 5 | 3:00 | 22-2-1 |
| 2008-09-21 | Win | (Netherlands) Marvin Sansaar | SLAMM Events presents "Back to the Old School" | Amsterdam, Netherlands | Decision (Unanimous) | 5 | 3:00 | 22-1-1 |
| 2008-05-25 | Loss | (Armenia) Marat Grigorian | Muay Thai Gala | Hoofddorp, Netherlands | TKO (Doctor stoppage) | | | 21-1-1 |
| 2008-02-23 | Win | (Morocco) Ilias Ghazouat | Gala in Nieuwegein | Nieuwegein, Netherlands | Decision (Unanimous) | 5 | 2:00 | 21-0-1 |
| 2008-02-17 | Draw | (Netherlands) Robin van Roosmalen | K-1 MAX Netherlands 2008, Opening Fight | Utrecht, Netherlands | Decision Draw | 3 | 3:00 | 21-0-1 |
| 2007-10-21 | Win | (Morocco) Hammadi el Mahdaoui | TT Beverwijk Gala | Beverwijk, Netherlands | Decision | 4 | 2:00 | 20-0 |
| 2007-09-01 | Win | (Netherlands) Sergio Menig | Kumiteé Everybody Gym | Hilversum, Netherlands | KO | 2 | | 19-0 |
| 2007-06-16 | Win | (Russia) Omayev Shamil | Fight Night Purmerend | Purmerend, Netherlands | TKO | 4 | | 18-0 |
| 2007-05-12 | Win | (Turkey) Şamil Ünal | Kumiteé Everybody Gym | Hilversum, Netherlands | Decision (Unanimous) | 5 | 2:00 | 17-0 |
| 2007-04-15 | Win | (Morocco) Nourdin Kassrioui | Champions of the Future | Hoofddorp, Netherlands | Decision (Unanimous) | 5 | 3:00 | 16-0 |
| 2007-03-03 | Win | (Germany) Sahand Dorff | Fight Night Amsterdam, Zonnehuis | Amsterdam, Netherlands | TKO (Corner stoppage) | | | 15-0 |
| 2007-02-03 | Win | (Morocco) Farid Riffi | Battle of Flevoland | Netherlands | Decision (Unanimous) | 5 | 2:00 | 14-0 |
| 2006-10-29 | Win | (Morocco) Bilal Siali | Champions of the Future | Hoofddorp, Netherlands | TKO (Ref stop./gave up) | 3 | | 13-0 |
| 2006-10-01 | Win | (Suriname) Murthel Groenhart | SLAMM "Nederland vs Thailand II" | Almere, Netherlands | Decision (Unanimous) | 5 | 2:00 | 12-0 |
| 2006-05-06 | Win | (Morocco) Ilias Zbairi | WFCA Muay Thai Gala Katwijk | Katwijk, Netherlands | Decision (Unanimous) | 3 | 2:00 | 11-0 |
| 2006-02-12 | Win | (Netherlands) Dams Morach | Gala in Zilvermeeuwen | Amsterdam, Netherlands | Decision | 3 | 2:00 | 10-0 |
| 2006-01-28 | Win | (Netherlands) Nick Beljaards | Fight Club, Wellness Profi Center | Purmerend, Netherlands | Decision (Unanimous) | 3 | 2:00 | 9-0 |
| 2005-12-10 | Win | (Morocco) Bilal Fiomar | Muay Thai gala Katwijk | Katwijk, Netherlands | Decision (Unanimous) | 3 | 2:00 | 8-0 |
| 2005-11-26 | Win | (Suriname) Fernando Groenhart | Muay Thai gala Hoogwoud | Hoogwoud, Netherlands | Decision (Unanimous) | 3 | 2:00 | 7-0 |
| 2005-10-01 | Win | (Republic of Ireland) Anthony Kane | Fightsport gala "Avondje Oost" | Hilversum, Netherlands | Decision (Unanimous) | 3 | 2:00 | 6-0 |
| 2005-09-18 | Win | (Thailand) Tanit Im On | Gala in Zilvermeeuwen | Zaandam, Netherlands | Decision | 3 | 2:00 | 5-0 |
| 2005-05-21 | Win | (Morocco) Mohamed el Bouddounti | Muay Thai gala Purmerend | Purmerend, Netherlands | KO | 2 | | 4-0 |
| 2005-04-24 | Win | (Netherlands) Evert Wolff | Nederland vs Russia, Jaap Edenhal | Amsterdam, Netherlands | TKO | 1 | | 3-0 |
| 2005-02-12 | Win | (Netherlands) Youssef Srour | Gala in Badhoevedorp | Badhoevedorp, Netherlands | TKO (Referee stoppage) | 2 | 1:01 | 2-0 |
| 2004-09-18 | Win | (Turkey) Kurt Gökhan | Gala in Zilvermeeuwen | Amsterdam, Netherlands | TKO | 1 | | 1-0 |
Legend: Win Loss Draw/No contest Notes

== See also ==
- List of K-1 events
- List of male kickboxers
