= Khalid Bourdif =

Dutch-Moroccan kickboxer

- Born: Khalid Bourdif; August 1, 1981; Morocco
- Nationality: Dutch
- Height: 1.81 m (5 ft 11 1/2 in)
- Weight: 72.5 kg (160 lb; 11 st 6 lb)
- Division: Middleweight
- Style: Kickboxing
- Stance: Orthodox
- Fighting out of: Ondiep, Utrecht, Netherlands
- Team: Otmani Gym; Kickboxing Club Arnhem; Bourdif Gym
- Trainer: Nourdin El Otmani; Fred Royers

Kickboxing record
- Total: 66
- Wins: 61
- By knockout: 34
- Losses: 5

Khalid Bourdif is a retired Dutch-Moroccan kickboxer, throughout his career he has been ranked as one of the ten best light heavyweight in the world by Liver Kick.

He is the former two time Dutch Muay Thai National champion, the former 76 kg Klash and SLAMM!! Events Champion, as well as the 2009 Beast of the East Tournament Winner.

== Biography and career ==
In 2009 Bourdif entered the eight man Beast of the East 72.5 kg tournament. In the quarterfinals he faced the two time K-1 MAX tournament winner José Reis. He won a unanimous decision. In the semi-finals he scored a third-round TKO win over Dave Van Den Ploeg. In the finals he fought the It's Showtime and SuperLeague champion Alviar Lima. He won the fight by unanimous decision.

In May 2019, he fought and defeated Amir Zeyada. At the end of the year, during SLAMM "Nederland vs Thailand VI" he fought Yodsanklai Fairtex for the WMC World Middleweight title. He lost a unanimous decision.

In 2010 he fought and beat Ali Gunyar during New Generation Warriors 4, as well as Murthel Groenhart during Fightclub presents: It's Showtime 2010.

His last fight came in 2015, when he lost by TKO to Regian Eersel. Since his retirement, he has opened his own gym, the Bourdif Gym, with the aim of working with troubled youths. The municipality of Utrecht voted it the Best Sports Association for 2019.

== Championships and accomplishments ==
- Beast of the East
  - 2009 Beast of the East 72.5 kg Tournament Winner
- SLAMM!! Events
  - SLAMM!! 76 kg World Championship
- KlasH
  - KlasH 76 kg World Championship

== Kickboxing record ==
Kickboxing record
61 wins (34 KOs), 5 losses
Date	Result	Opponent	Event	Location	Method	Round	Time
2015-04-19	Loss	Regian Eersel	The Best of all Elements	Almere, Netherlands	TKO (Doctor Stoppage)	2	
2014-02-22	Win	Wiliam Diender	Enfusion Live - Sportmani Events V	Amsterdam, Netherlands	Decision (Unanimous)	3	3:00
2011-03-12	Loss	Marcus Oberg	Oktagon 2011: Petrosyan vs Cosmo	Milan, Italy	Decision (Unanimous)	3	3:00
2010-12-18	Win	Murthel Groenhart	Fightclub presents: It's Showtime 2010	Amsterdam, Netherlands	Decision (Unanimous)	3	3:00
2010-05-2	Win	Ali Gunyar	New Generation Warriors 4	Utrecht, Netherlands	Decision (Unanimous)	3	3:00
2009-11-29	Loss	Yodsanklai Fairtex	SLAMM "Nederland vs Thailand VI"	Almere, Netherlands	Decision (Unanimous)	5	3:00
For the WMC World Middleweight Championship (160 lbs).
2009-05-31	Win	Amir Zeyada	Amsterdam Fight Club	Amsterdam, Netherlands	Decision (Unanimous)	3	3:00
2009-01-24	Win	Alviar Lima	Beast of the East, Final	Zutphen, Netherlands	Decision (Unanimous)	3	3:00
2009 Beast of the East 72.5 kg Tournament Final
2009-01-24	Win	Dave Van Den Ploeg	Beast of the East, Semi-final	Zutphen, Netherlands	TKO	3	
2009-01-24	Win	José Reis	Beast of the East, Quarter-final	Zutphen, Netherlands	Decision (Unanimous)	3	3:00
2008-12-	Win	Yucel Fidan		Netherlands	Decision	5	3:00
2008-03-08	Draw	Kaoklai Kaennorsing	Fight Night in Düsseldorf	Düsseldorf, Germany	Decision	5	3:00
2007-11-11	Draw	Halim El Issaoui	Enter The Dragon 5	Arnhem, Netherlands	Decision	5	3:00
2007-05-19	Win	Lindo Profas	Fight Sensation 2	Doetinchem Netherlands	Decision	5	3:00
Legend: Win Loss Draw/No contest Notes

== See also ==
- List of male kickboxers
