= Choplin =

Choplin is a French surname. It may refer to

- Grégory Choplin (born 1980), French-Ivorian Muay Thai kickboxer
- Jérémy Choplin (born 1985), French football player

== See also ==
- Choplin (チョップリン), Japanese comedy duo from the Kansai area
