= Marco Piqué =

Surinamese-Dutch welterweight kickboxer

- Born: January 9, 1980 (age 46); Paramaribo, Suriname
- Other names: The Sniper
- Height: 1.83 m (6 ft 0 in)
- Weight: 72.5 kg (160 lb; 11.42 st)
- Division: Welterweight; Middleweight
- Style: Muay Thai
- Fighting out of: The Hague, Netherlands
- Team: ARJ Trainingen
- Trainer: Maikel Polanen
- Years active: 2001–present

Kickboxing record
- Total: 117
- Wins: 68
- By knockout: 28
- Losses: 47
- By knockout: 8
- Draws: 2
- Last updated on: March 7, 2015

Marco "The Sniper" Piqué (born January 9, 1980) is a Surinamese-Dutch welterweight kickboxer, fighting out of Team Snipers in The Hague, Netherlands. He is the current World Full Contact Association Muay Thai middleweight world champion, WMC intercontinental champion, and a two-time K-1 MAX regional tournament finalist.

== Biography and career ==
Originally from Suriname, Piqué has fought the majority of his fights in the Netherlands. He won his first title in 2003 when he defeated Alviar Lima via split decision to claim the W.P.K.L. Dutch national Muay Thai title. Over the next couple of years Piqué claimed the W.F.C.A. Benelux title and the W.P.K.L. European title as well as losing to legendary Thai fighter Jongsanan Fairtex in Las Vegas in a bid to win Fairtex's I.K.K.C. world title belt. Throughout 2006 Piqué started to regularly face some of the world's best middleweight kickboxers, losing to Buakaw Por. Pramuk, Şahin Yakut and Giorgio Petrosyan, the latter in the final of the annual Janus Fight tournament. His record was patchy by the end of 2006 but he had a terrific 2007, winning two preliminary tournaments and reaching the final of two more, winning thirteen out of fifteen fights and beating some top fighters such as Chaid Oulad El Hadj and Petr Polak.

In 2008 Piqué made his K-1 MAX debut at the K-1 MAX Netherlands 2008 in Utrecht, making his way to the final in a tough tournament which included a victory over tournament favourite Joerie Mes in the quarter-finals. In the final Piqué found Warren Stevelmans a step too far and was unable to make it to the K-1 MAX final 16 stage. He entered another K-1 MAX tournament in Sweden later in the year but could only reach the semi-finals. Piqué returned to K-1 MAX the following year, again reaching the final at the K-1 World MAX 2009 Europe but once more failing to make the next step to the K-1 World MAX final by dropping a decision to up and comer Leroy Kaestner. Piqué made up somewhat for this defeat later in the year by winning the W.M.C. intercontinental title and then the World Full Contact Association (W.F.C.A.) world title in his native Suriname.

He lost to Issam Reghi via decision at Time Fight 2 in Tours, France on October 6, 2012.

On the verge of throwing up, Pique quit on his stool before the fifth round against Raphaël Llodra at Best of Siam 3 in Paris, France, on February 14, 2013.

He lost a unanimous decision to Suriya Prasathinpimai at Thailand vs. Europe 2013 in Neu-Ulm, Germany on March 23, 2013.

On July 6, 2013, Piqué lost to John Wayne Parr by decision at Boonchu Cup: Caged Muay Thai 3 on the Gold Coast, Australia.

He beat Dima Weimer on points at Day of Destruction 7 in Hamburg, Germany on September 14, 2013.

He lost to Grégory Choplin via UD in the main event of Lion Fight 14 in Las Vegas, Nevada, United States on March 28, 2014.

== Titles ==
- 2010 Superfighters 8 Man Tournament Champion
- 2009 W.F.C.A. Muay Thai world champion -72.5 kg
- 2009 W.M.C. Muay Thai Intercontinental title -72.5 kg
- 2009 K-1 MAX Europe tournament runner up -70 kg
- 2008 K-1 MAX Netherlands tournament runner up -70 kg
- 2007 Kings of Kickboxing 2007 Pforzheim preliminary tournament champion -75 kg
- 2007 Rayong-Dreamfights GP Part II tournament champion -73 kg
- 2005 W.P.K.L. Dutch Muay Thai champion -76 kg
- 2005 W.P.K.L. European Muay Thai champion -76 kg
- 2004 W.F.C.A. Benelux Muay Thai champion
- 2003 W.P.K.L. Dutch Muay Thai champion -72.5 kg

== Kickboxing ==
Kickboxing Record
68 Wins (28 (T)KO's, 36 decisions), 47 Losses, 2 Draw
Date	Result	Opponent	Event	Location	Method	Round	Time
2017-05-13	Win	(Turkey) Kadir Tastan	Akin Dovus Arenasi	Turkey	Decision	3	3.00
2017-01-14	Loss	(China) Yi Long	2016 World Kickboxing Championship	Zhengzhou, China	Decision	3	3:00
2016-12-03	Loss	(Turkey) Atakan Arslan	Mix Fight Gala 20	Frankfurt, Germany	Decision (Unanimous)	3	3:00
For The Mix Fight Gala -81 kg Championship.
2016-05-28	Loss	(Iran) Masoud Minaei	Akın Dövüs Arenası	Turkey	Decision	3	3.00
2016-04-23	Win	(Turkey) Erkan Varol	Champions Night	Istanbul, Turkey	Decision	3	3.00
2016-04-03	Loss	(Netherlands) Murthel Groenhart	WFL - Where Heroes Meet Legends, Semi-final	Almere, The Netherlands	Decision	3	3.00
2016-03-12	Loss	(Albania) Hysni Beqiri	Superpro Fight Night 7	Basel, Switzerland	Decision	3	3:00
2015-12-20	Loss	(Italy) Alessandro Campagna	Invictus Arena, Prestige Fight	Rome, Italy	Decision (unanimous)	3	3:00
2015-12-05	Win	(China) Wang Hesong	WLF	Zhengzhou, China	Decision	3	3.00
2015-10-24	Loss	(United States) Marcus Fisher	VVWS	Panama City, Panama	Decision	3	3:00
2015-03-14	Loss	(Armenia) Harut Grigorian	Enfusion Live 25	Turnhout, Belgium	Decision	3	3:00
2015-03-07	Win	(China) Sun Weichao	Wu Lin Feng	Zhengzhou, China	Decision (Unanimous)	3	3:00
2015-02-21	Loss	(Albania) Berat Aliu	Gladiators Fight Night	Baden, Switzerland	Decision	3	3:00
2015-01-16	Win	(United States) Michael Corley	Legacy Kickboxing 1	Houston, USA	TKO (punches)	3	
2014-12-05	Win	(China) Jiang Chunpeng	Kunlun Fight 14	Bangkok, Thailand	Ext.R Decision (Unanimous)	4	3:00
2014-10-04	Win	(Turkey) Erkan Varol	Mix Fight Gala XVI	Istanbul, Turkey	Decision (Unanimous)	3	3:00
2014-09-13	Draw	(Albania) Shkodran Veseli	Gladiators Fight Night	Baden, Switzerland	Decision (Draw)		3:00
2014-05-03	Win	(Albania) Berat Aliu	La Familia Fightnight 5	Halle, Germany	Decision (Unanimous)	3	3:00
2014-04-26	Win	(France) Steeve Valente	Mix Fight Gala XV	Darmstadt, Germany	TKO (Injury)	1	
2014-03-28	Loss	(France) Grégory Choplin	Lion Fight 14	Las Vegas, Nevada, USA	Decision (Unanimous)	5	3:00
2014-03-07	Win	(Turkey) Mücahit Kulak	AKIN Dövüş Arenası KickBoxing Event	Turkey	Decision	3	3:00
2014-02-22	Win	(Albania) Shkodran Veseli	Fight Night	Vienna, Austria	Decision (Split)	5	3:00
2013-10-12	Loss	(Suriname) Darryl Sichtman	TatNeft Arena World Cup 2013, Final	Kazan, Russia	KO (knee)	3	2:17
2013-09-14	Win	(Germany) Dima Weimer	Day of Destruction 7	Hamburg, Germany	Decision	3	3:00
2013-07-06	Loss	(Australia) John Wayne Parr	Boonchu Cup: Caged Muay Thai 3	Gold Coast, Australia	Decision	5	3:00
2013-06-01	Loss	(Slovakia) Vladimír Moravčík	Profiliga Muaythai 13	Banská Bystrica, Slovakia	Decision (unanimous)	5	3:00
For WMC European Muay Thai (-76.2 kg) Championship.
2013-03-23	Loss	(Thailand) Suriya Prasathinphimai	Thailand vs. Europe 2013	Neu-Ulm, Germany	Decision (Unanimous)	5	3:00
2013-02-14	Loss	(France) Raphaël Llodra	Best of Siam 3	Paris, France	TKO (Retirement)	4	3:00
2012-10-06	Loss	(France) Issam Reghi	Time Fight 2	Tours, France	Decision	3	3:00
2012-09-08	Loss	(Germany) Max Baumert	5. Merseburger Fight Night	Merseburg, Germany	Decision	3	3:00
2012-07-27	Loss	(Thailand) Eakpracha Meenayothin	WMC Prince's Cup 2012, Semi-final	Bangkok, Thailand	KO	1	
2012-05-26	Win	(Slovakia) Jan Mazur	Profiliga Muaythai 12	Banská Bystrica, Slovakia	Decision (Unanimous)	3	3:00
2012-02-12	Win	(Morocco) Mohammed Medhar	Natural Powers	Eindhoven, Netherlands	Decision	3	3:00
2012-01-21	Loss	(Thailand) Sudsakorn Sor Klinmee	Yokkao Extreme 2012	Milan, Italy	Decision (Unanimous)	5	3:00
2011-09-02	Win	(Turkey) Ali Gunyar	Muay Thai Premier League: Round 3	The Hague, Netherlands	Decision (Unanimous)	5	3:00
2011-09-02	Loss	(Netherlands) Nieky Holzken	Muaythai Premier League: Round 1	Long Beach, California, USA	Decision	5	3:00
2011-04-30	Loss	(Thailand) Naruepol Fairtex	Ring Rules Kickboxing	Milan, Italy	Ext.R Decision	4	3:00
2011-04-11	Win	(Morocco) Yassin Lahmidi	Almere's Finest	Almere, Netherlands	Decision (Unanimous)	5	3:00
2011-01-22	Win	(Italy) Bruno Franchi	KnocKOut - Oktagon K-1	Rome, Italy	Ext.R Decision (Unanimous)	4	3:00
2010-12-04	Win	(Italy) Paolo Bellini	Janus Fight Night 2010	Padua, Italy	Decision (Unanimous)	3	3:00
2010-09-05	Loss	(Syria) Baker Barakat	Humans Fight Night IV, welterweight tournament semi final	Hamburg, Germany	Med. Int.	3	
2010-09-05	Win	(Germany) Ulli Schick	Humans Fight Night IV, welterweight tournament quarter final	Hamburg, Germany	Decision (Unanimous)	3	3:00
2010-07-04	Win	(Morocco) Mourad Ouchen	SLAMM "Last fight before Summer"	Amsterdam, Netherlands	Decision	5	3:00
2010-06-26	Win	(Armenia) Armen Petrosyan	The Shock	Palermo, Italy	Decision	5	3:00
2010-04-17	Win	(Netherlands) Chris van Venrooij	Superfighters 8 Man Tournament, Final	Frankfurt, Germany	Extension round decision	4	3:00
Wins Superfighters 8 Man Tournament.
2010-04-17	Win	(Germany) Andreas Rogner	Superfighters 8 Man Tournament, Semi-finals	Frankfurt, Germany	KO	2	
2010-04-17	Win	(Georgia (country)) Davit Kiria	Superfighters 8 Man Tournament, Quarter-finals	Frankfurt, Germany	Extension round decision	4	3:00
2009-12-23	Win	(Italy) Bruno Franchi	Klaar Om Te Bosse!!	Paramaribo, Suriname	KO	3	
Wins W.F.C.A. Muay Thai world title -72.5 kg.
2009-11-07	Loss	(Thailand) Yodsanklai Fairtex	Janus FightNight: Thai Boxe Last Challenge	Padua, Italy	Decision (Unanimous)	3	3:00
2009-06-26	Win	(Scotland) Sean Wright	Champions of Champions 2	Montego Bay, Jamaica	KO (Right Overhand)	1	1:22
Wins W.M.C. Muay Thai Intercontinental title -72.5 kg.
2009-05-31	Win	(Morocco) Tarik Slimani	Next Generation Warriors III	Utrecht, Netherlands	Decision (Unanimous)	5	3:00
2009-03-01	Loss	(Netherlands) Leroy Kaestner	K-1 World MAX 2009 Europe, Final	Utrecht, Netherlands	Decision (Unanimous)	3	3:00
Fails to qualify for K-1 World MAX 2009 Final 16.
2009-03-01	Win	(Morocco) Hafid El Boustati	K-1 World MAX 2009 Europe, Semi-finals	Utrecht, Netherlands	TKO (Doc Stop/Cut)	3	
2009-03-01	Win	(Democratic Republic of the Congo) Chris Ngimbi	K-1 World MAX 2009 Europe, Quarter-finals	Utrecht, Netherlands	Ext.R Decision (Unanimous)	4	3:00
2008-11-30	Loss	(Netherlands) Nieky Holzken	SLAMM "Nederland vs Thailand V"	Almere, Netherlands	KO (Left Hook)	3	2:56
2008-10-31	Win	(Denmark) Christian Klingenberg	K-1 Scandinavia Rumble of the Kings 2008	Luleå, Sweden	KO (Straight Right Punch)	2	0:32
2008-06-20	Loss	(Thailand) Diesellek TopkingBoxing	International Muay Thai Fight Night	Montego Bay, Jamaica	Decision	5	3:00
The fight was for the International Kickboxing Federation IKF World Title
2008-05-31	Loss	(United Arab Emirates) Dzhabar Askerov	K-1 Scandinavia MAX 2008, Semi-finals	Stockholm, Sweden	Ext.R Decision (Unanimous)	4	3:00
2008-05-31	Win	(Australia) Bruce Macfie	K-1 Scandinavia MAX 2008, Quarter-finals	Stockholm, Sweden	KO (Right Knee Strike)	2	0:21
2008-05-03	Win	(Germany) Victor Dick	New Generation Warriors	Utrecht, Netherlands	TKO (Doc Stop)	3	
2008-02-17	Loss	(South Africa) Warren Stevelmans	K-1 MAX Netherlands 2008, Final	Utrecht, Netherlands	Decision (Unanimous)	3	3:00
Fails to qualify for K-1 World MAX 2008 Final 16.
2008-02-17	Win	(Suriname) Imro Main	K-1 MAX Netherlands 2008, Semi-finals	Utrecht, Netherlands	Decision (Unanimous)	3	3:00
2008-02-17	Win	(Netherlands) Joerie Mes	K-1 MAX Netherlands 2008, Quarter-finals	Utrecht, Netherlands	Ext.R Decision (Unanimous)	4	3:00
2007-11-24	Loss	(Armenia) Giorgio Petrosyan	Janus Fight Night 2007, Final	Padua, Italy	Decision (Unanimous)	3	3:00
Fight was for Janus Fight Night 2007 tournament title -72 kg.
2007-11-24	Win	(France) Yassine Benhadj	Janus Fight Night 2007, Semi-finals	Padua, Italy	Decision	3	3:00
2007-11-24	Win	(Germany) Mark Vogel	Janus Fight Night 2007, Quarter-finals	Padua, Italy	Ext.R Decision	4	3:00
2007-10-28	Win	(Japan) Takashi Ono	Shootboxing Battle Summit Ground Zero 2007	Tokyo, Japan	Decision	3	3:00
2007-09-30	Loss	(Germany) Dennis Schneidmiller	RDF Dodge Trophy Final 2007, Final	Ulm, Germany	Decision (Split)	3	3:00
Fight was for RDF Dodge Trophy Final 2007 tournament title -73 kg.
2007-09-30	Win	(Iran) Foad Sadeghi	RDF Dodge Trophy Final 2007, Semi-finals	Ulm, Germany	Decision	3	3:00
2007-09-30	Win	(Germany) Dennis Oliwka	RDF Dodge Trophy Final 2007, Quarter-finals	Ulm, Germany	Decision	3	3:00
2007-08-26	Win	(Germany) Yavuz Ozden	Return of the King I	Paramaribo, Suriname	KO	2	
2007-06-02	Win	(Morocco) Chaid Oulad El Hadj	Gentleman Fight Night IV	Tilburg, Netherlands	Decision	5	3:00
2007-05-04	Win	(Turkey) Ali Gunyar	Steko's Fight Night 24, Final	Pforzheim, Germany	Decision (Unanimous)	3	3:00
Wins Kings of Kickboxing 2007 Pforzheim preliminary tournament title -75 kg. Was meant to qualify for Kings of Kickboxing 2007 Final later that year but withdrew from event.
2007-04-05	Win	(Portugal) Luis Reis	Steko's Fight Night 24, Semi-finals	Pforzheim, Germany	Decision (Unanimous)	3	3:00
2007-04-21	Win	(Spain) Ricardo Hernandez	C.L.K Mucho Machismo	Lisbon, Portugal	KO	2	
2007-04-07	Win	(Spain) Abraham Roqueni	Balans Fight Night	Tilburg, Netherlands	TKO (Corner Stoppage)	1	
2007-01-27	Win	(Czech Republic) Petr Polak	Rayong-Dreamfights GP Part II, Final	Giengen, Germany	Decision	3	3:00
Wins Rayong-Dreamfights GP Part II tournament and qualifies for RDF Dodge Trophy Final 2007.
2007-01-27	Win	(Germany) Pacco Koscielniak	Rayong-Dreamfights GP Part II, Semi-finals	Giengen, Germany	TKO	1	
2006-12-02	Loss	(Italy) Giorgio Petrosyan	Janus Fight Night 2006, Final	Padua, Italy	Decision (Unanimous)	3	3:00
Fight was for Janus Fight Night 2006 tournament title -72 kg.
2006-12-02	Win	(Thailand) Samkor Kiatmontep	Janus Fight Night 2006, Semi-finals	Padua, Italy	Decision	3	3:00
2006-12-02	Win	(Portugal) José Reis	Janus Fight Night 2006, Quarter-finals	Padua, Italy	Decision	3	3:00
2006-11-12	Loss	(Cape Verde) Alviar Lima	2H2H Pride & Honor Ahoy 2006	Rotterdam, Netherlands	Decision (Unanimous)	5	3:00
2006-06-03	Loss	(Turkey) Şahin Yakut	Gentleman Fight Night III	Tilburg, Netherlands	KO	4	
2006-03-19	Loss	(Thailand) Buakaw Por. Pramuk	SLAMM "Nederland vs Thailand"	Almere, Netherlands	Decision (Unanimous)	5	3:00
2005-12-21	Win	(Suriname) Franklin Beuk	The Night of Immortality	Paramaribo, Suriname	TKO	3	
2005-10-30	Loss	(Morocco) Najim Ettouhali	It's Showtime 75MAX Trophy, 1st round - Alkmaar, Pool A Semi-finals	Alkmaar, Netherlands	Decision	3	3:00
2005-09-04	Win	(France) Nadir Lahrech	Muay Thai Champions League XIV	Amsterdam, Netherlands	Decision	5	3:00
Wins W.P.K.L. Dutch Muay Thai title -76 kg.
2005-05-28	Loss	(Thailand) Malaipet Sasiprapa	Muay Thai World Championships	Las Vegas, Nevada, USA	Decision	5	3:00
Elimination fight to face Jongsanan Fairtex for his I.K.K.C. Junior Welterweight Muay Thai world title.
2005-04-30	Win	(England) Roy Jones	Beatmasters Show	Manchester, England, UK	TKO	5	
Wins W.P.K.L. European Muay Thai title -76 kg.
2005-02-05	Loss	(Thailand) Jongsanan Fairtex	Muay Thai World Championships	Las Vegas, Nevada, USA	TKO (Ref Stop/Punch)	3	1:15
Fight was for Fairtex's I.K.K.C. Junior Welterweight Muay Thai world title -63 kg.
2004-11-14	Win	(Belgium) Alain Dumas	MT/MF Fight Gala	Almere, Netherlands	Decision	5	3:00
2004-09-25	Win	(Turkey) Rasit Biner	Gala Schuttersveld	Rotterdam, Netherlands	KO (Knee Strike)		
Wins W.F.C.A. Benelux Muay Thai title.
2004-04-21	Loss	(Morocco) Youness El Mhassani	Profighters Gala in Almere	Almere, Netherlands	Decision	5	3:00
2004-02-22	Loss	(Cape Verde) Alviar Lima	2H2H	Rotterdam, Netherlands	Decision (Unanimous)	5	3:00
2003-11-30	Loss	(Turkey) Ali Gunyar	Killerdome V	Amsterdam, Netherlands	Decision	5	3:00
2003-10-19	Win	(Netherlands) Ron Post	Zaantheater	Zaandam, Netherlands	Decision (Unanimous)	5	3:00
2003-05-31	Win	(Cape Verde) Alviar Lima	Muay Thai Express I	Rotterdam, Netherlands	Decision (Split)	5	3:00
Wins W.P.K.L. Dutch Muay Thai title -72.5 kg.
2003-04-12	Loss	(France) Nadir Larech	Magic Duo Part 3	Eindhoven, Netherlands	Decision	5	3:00
2003-03-29	Loss	(Turkey) Şahin Yakut	Muaythai Champions League Rome, Pool B Final	Rome, Italy	TKO (Corner Stoppage)	2	
Fight was for W.P.K.L. Muay Thai Champion League Rome Pool B Final -72.5 kg.
2003-03-29	Win	(Italy) Maurizio Romita	Muaythai Champions League Rome, Pool B Semi-finals	Rome, Italy	Ext.R Decision	4	3:00
2003-02-15	Loss	(Netherlands) William Diender	Xena Sport Victory or Hell 8	Amsterdam, Netherlands	Decision	5	3:00
2002-07-07	Loss	(Armenia) Gago Drago	Bad Boys Day Part 1	Netherlands	KO (Right High Kick)	4	-
2002-04-21	Loss	(Armenia) Gago Drago	Xena Sport Victory or Hell 7	Netherlands	Decision (Unanimous)	5	3:00
2002-02-17	Draw	(Netherlands) Benito Caupain	W.P.K.L. Gala in Hogendorphal	Amsterdam, Netherlands	Decision Draw	5	3:00
2001-11-03	Loss	(Morocco) Faldir Chahbari	Gala in Brediushal	Amsterdam, Netherlands	Decision	5	2:00
Legend: Win Loss Draw/No contest Notes

== See also ==
- List of K-1 Events
- List of K-1 champions
- List of male kickboxers
