= Alviar Lima =

Cape Verdean-Dutch kickboxer

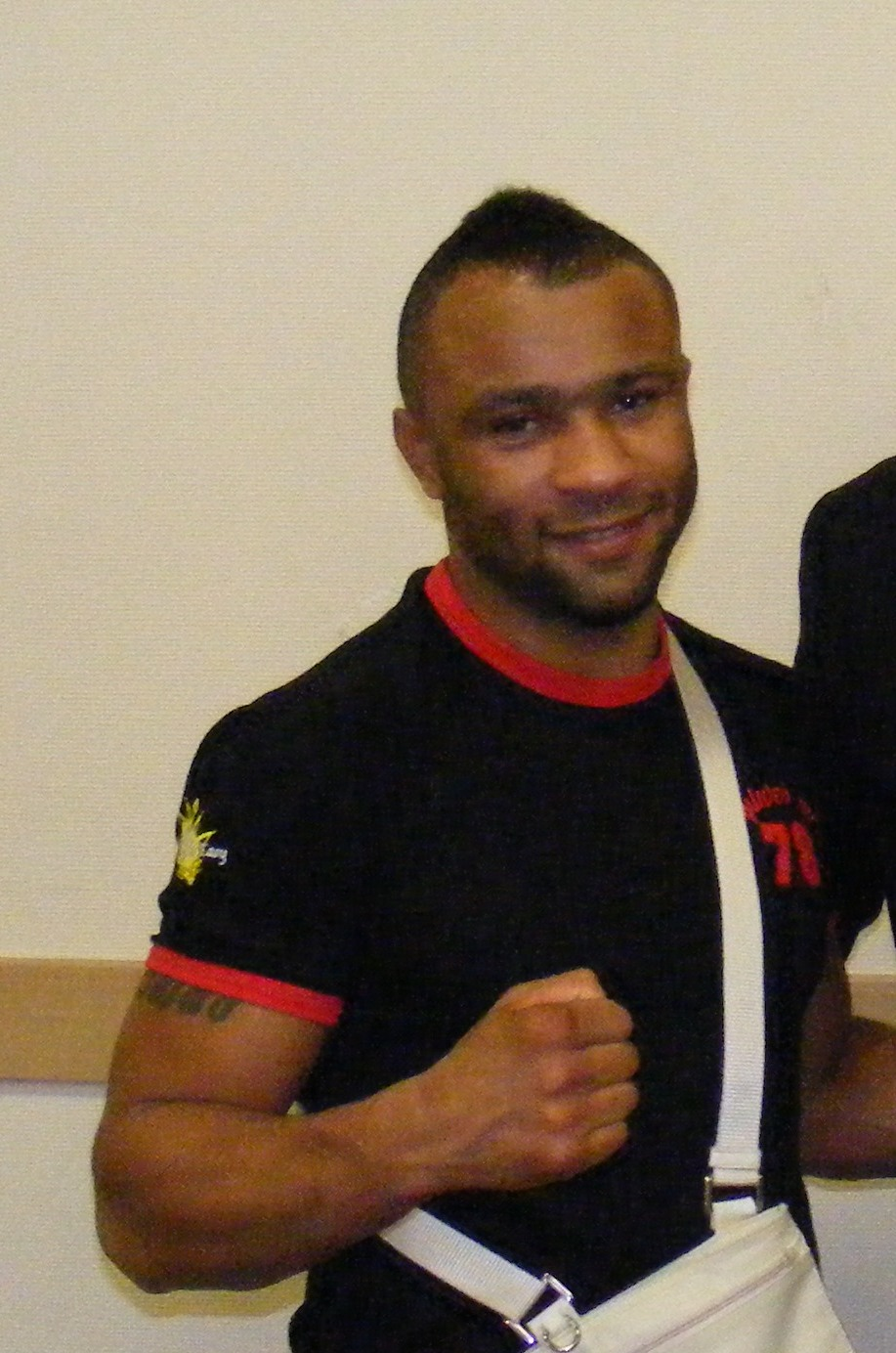
- Lima at Ring Masters Olympia press conference, Istanbul in 2008
- Born: Alviar Lima; March 23, 1978 (age 48); Cape Verde
- Other names: The Machine
- Nationality: Dutch; Cape Verdean
- Height: 1.80 m (5 ft 11 in)
- Weight: 76 kg (168 lb; 12.0 st)
- Division: Welterweight; Middleweight
- Style: Muay Thai
- Stance: Orthodox
- Fighting out of: Rotterdam, Netherlands
- Team: Team SuperPro (2005–2013); Sitan Gym
- Trainer: Dennis Krauweel
- Years active: 1999–2013

Kickboxing record
- Total: 78
- Wins: 58
- By knockout: 28
- Losses: 17
- By knockout: 2
- Draws: 3
- Last updated on: May 24, 2013

Alviar "The Machine" Lima (born 23 March 1978) is a Cape Verdean-Dutch retired kickboxer who fought out of Rotterdam, Netherlands. He made his K-1 debut against Warren Stevelmans in K-1 MAX Netherlands 2008 The Final Qualification.

== Career ==
Lima has fought in various events and tournaments around Europe such as Beast of the East, It's Showtime Trophy, KlasH, SuperLeague, and Ring Masters. In SuperLeague, he reached his peak with clutching the title where he had beaten respectively José Reis, Ali Gunyar, and Kamal El Amrani in 2005. He also has some remarkable victory records over Imro Main and Vasily Shish in Klash Event.

He has been invited to K-1 after his knock-out victory over Nieky Holzken, which also was selected as one of the best KOs of the year by Fight Club, the martial arts magazine of multi-sports channel Eurosport.

On 24 May 2013, Lima fought his retirement fight against Romanian prospect Alexandru Irimia. Coach Dennis Krauweel cried when Lima announced once again his retirement. He was awarded for his win by his Team SuperPro colleague, Rico Verhoeven.

== Miscellaneous ==
Former K-1 World Max champion Albert Kraus and It's Showtime Reality Show contender Swede fighter Elias Daniel were some of his sparring mates.

His name is also written as Aalviar Lima instead.

== Titles ==
- 2010 Beast of the East tournament runner up -72.5 kg
- 2009 Beast of the East tournament runner up -72.5 kg
- 2008 WFCA Muaythai World champion -76 kg
- 2008 WFCA Thaiboxing Middleweight world champion -72.57 kg
- 2007 IKBA Thaiboxing World champion
- 2006 SuperLeague Middleweight title -73 kg
- 2006 It's Showtime 75MAX Trophy Belgium Pool A winner -75 kg
- 2005 IKBA Thaiboxing World champion -73 kg
- 2005 SuperLeague Middleweight Tournament champion -73 kg

== Kickboxing record ==
Kickboxing record
58 wins (28 (T)KOs, 30 decisions), 17 losses, 3 draws
Date	Result	Opponent	Event	Location	Method	Round	Time
2013-05-24	Win	(Romania) Alexandru Irimia	KlasH Champions Challenge: Drumul către Glorie! Bătălia de pe Bega	Timișoara, Romania	Decision (split)	3	3:00
Lima wins and retires.
2012-09-02	Win	(Netherlands) Darryl Sichtman	Muay Thai Mania 5	The Hague, Netherlands	TKO	3	
2011-11-19	Loss	(Turkey) Tevfik Sucu	SuperKombat World Grand Prix Final 2011	Darmstadt, Germany	Decision (unanimous)	3	3:00
2011-05-29	Win	(Netherlands) Lindo Profas	The Battle of the Rotterdam Rebels 9	Rotterdam, Netherlands	Decision (unanimous)	3	3:00
2010-06-12	Win	(Poland) Lukasz Rambalski	Beast of the East 2010 Poland	Gdynia, Poland	Decision (unanimous)	3	3:00
2010-03-07	Loss	(South Africa) Warren Stevelmans	Time For Action presents: Team SuperPro 10 Year Anniversary	Nijmegen, Netherlands	Decision (unanimous)	3	3:00
Loses W.F.C.A. Thai-boxing middleweight world title -72.5 kg.
2010-01-30	Loss	(Albania) Shemsi Beqiri	Beast of the East 2010 tournament final	Zutphen, Netherlands	Decision (unanimous)	3	3:00
Fight was for Beast of the East 2010 (-72,5kg) tournament title.
2010-01-30	Win	(Turkey) Tevfik Sucu	Beast of the East 2010 tournament semi final	Zutphen, Netherlands	Decision (unanimous)	3	3:00
2010-01-30	Win	(Poland) Lukasz Rambalski	Beast of the East 2010 tournament quarter final	Zutphen, Netherlands	KO	2	
2009-12-19	Draw	(Turkey) Muhammed Gür	Mix Fight	Darmstadt, Germany	Decision draw	5	3:00
2009-10-31	Win	(Austria) Fadi Merza	KlasH European Elimination	Martigny, Switzerland	Decision (unanimous)	5	3:00
2009-04-21	Loss	(Ukraine) Artur Kyshenko	K-1 World MAX 2009 Final 16	Fukuoka, Japan	TKO (referee stoppage)	1	2:56
2009-01-24	Loss	(Morocco) Khalid Bourdif	Beast of the East 2009	Venice, Italy	Ext R. decision (unanimous)	4	3:00
For the Beast of the East 2009 (-72,5kg) tournament title.
2009-01-24	Win	(Netherlands) William Diender	Beast of the East 2009	Zutphen, Netherlands	Decision (unanimous)	3	3:00
2009-01-24	Win	(Romania) Szűcs Barnabás	Beast of the East 2009	Zutphen, Netherlands	Decision (unanimous)	3	3:00
2008-10-05	Loss	(Croatia) Goran Borovic	Tough Is Not Enough	Rotterdam, Netherlands	2 ext. R. decision (unanimous)	5	3:00
Fight was for OPBU Euro-African title (-70kg) under K-1 Rules.
2008-07-07	Win	(Germany) Mark Vogel	K-1 World MAX 2008 Final 8	Fukuoka, Japan	TKO (doctor stoppage)	2	3:00
2008-05-31	Win	(Turkey) Yücel Fidan	Beast of the East	Zutphen, Netherlands	TKO (doctor stoppage/cut)	2	0:59
2008-03-15	Loss	(France) Gregory Choplin	It's Showtime 75MAX Trophy 2008, Quarter Finals	's-Hertogenbosch, Netherlands	Decision (unanimous)	3	3:00
2008-02-17	Loss	(South Africa) Warren Stevelmans	K-1 MAX Netherlands 2008 The Final Qualification	Utrecht, Netherlands	Decision (split)	3	3:00
2008-01-26	Win	(Netherlands) Nieky Holzken	Beast of the East	Zutphen, Netherlands	KO (left hook)	3	0:36
Wins WFCA World Thaiboxing Middleweight (-72.57 kg) title.
2007-10-26	Win	(Belarus) Vasily Shish	KlasH Champions Battlefield: Show No Mercy	Sibiu, Romania	Decision (unanimous)	3	3:00
2007-07-21	Win	(Croatia) Mario Princ	KlasH Champions Battlefield II	Albufeira, Portugal	KO	1	
2007-04-28	Win	(Suriname) Imro Main	KlasH Champions Battlefield	Höör, Sweden	Decision	3	3:00
2007-03-24	Win	(Morocco) Yassin Boudrouz	It's Showtime Trophy 2007	Lommel, Belgium	TKO (doctor stoppage)	1	
Qualifies for It's Showtime 75MAX Trophy 2008.
2007-01-13	Win	(Belgium) Laurent Periquet	K-1 Rules Heavyweight Tournament 2007 in Turkey	Istanbul, Turkey	TKO (referee stoppage)	2	3:00
2006-11-12	Win	(Suriname) Marco Pique	2H2H Pride & Honor Ahoy 2006	Rotterdam, Netherlands	Decision (unanimous)	5	3:00
2006-10-14	Win	(Syria) Baker Barakat		Germany			
2006-09-23	Loss	(Turkey) Şahin Yakut	It's Showtime 75MAX Trophy Final 2006, Semi Finals	Rotterdam, Netherlands	Decision (unanimous)	3	3:00
2006-09-23	Win	(Morocco) Najim Ettouhlali	It's Showtime 75MAX Trophy Final 2006, Quarter Finals	Rotterdam, Netherlands	Ext R. decision (unanimous)	4	3:00
2006-06-03	Loss	(Thailand) Pajonsuk	Gentleman Fight Night 3	Tilburg, Netherlands	Decision (unanimous)	5	3:00
2006-05-13	Win	(Austria) Fadi Merza	SuperLeague Elimination 2006	Vienna, Austria	Decision (unanimous)	5	3:00
Wins SuperLeague Middleweight title -73 kg.
2006-03-11	Win	(Portugal) José Reis	SuperLeague Apocalypse 2006	Paris, France	Decision (unanimous)	3	3:00
2006-02-18	Win	(Suriname) Imro Main	It's Showtime 75MAX Trophy Belgium, Pool A Final	Mortsel, Belgium	TKO	1	
Qualifies for It's Showtime 75MAX Trophy Final 2006.
2006-02-18	Win	(Belgium) Jan van Denderen	It's Showtime 75MAX Trophy Belgium, Pool A Semi Finals	Mortsel, Belgium	Decision	3	3:00
2006-01-28	Win	(Czech Republic) Petr Polak	SuperLeague Hungary 2006	Budapest, Hungary	Decision (unanimous)	3	3:00
2005-12-18	Win	(England) Richard Fenwick	I.K.B.A. World Championships	Oss, Netherlands	Decision (unanimous)	5	3:00
Wins I.K.B.A. Thaiboxing world title -73 kg.
2005-10-22	Win	(Switzerland) Thomas Hladky	SuperLeague Heavy Knockout 2005	Vienna, Austria	Decision (unanimous)	3	3:00
2005-09-24	Win	(Germany) Kamal El Amrani	SuperLeague Turkey 2005, Final	Istanbul, Turkey	TKO (corner stoppage)	3	
Wins SuperLeague Tournament Turkey 2005 -73 kg title.
2005-09-24	Win	(Turkey) Ali Gunyar	SuperLeague Turkey 2005, Semi Finals	Istanbul, Turkey	TKO (corner stoppage)	2	
2005-09-24	Win	(Portugal) José Reis	SuperLeague Turkey 2005, Quarter Finals	Istanbul, Turkey	Decision	3	3:00
2005-05-21	Win	(Switzerland) Thomas Hladky	SuperLeague Germany 2005	Oberhausen, Germany	TKO (doctor stop/cut)	1	
2005-03-26	Draw	(Netherlands) Andy Souwer	East Side 4	Amsterdam, Netherlands	Decision draw	5	3:00
2004-12-18	Win	(Germany) Marko Stünkel	SuperLeague Netherlands 2004	Uden, Netherlands	TKO	5	
2004-11-14	Loss	(Suriname) Imro Main	Muay Thai/Mixed Fight Gala, Sporthal Stedenwijk	Almere, Netherlands	Decision (unanimous)	5	3:00
2004-02-22	Win	(Suriname) Marco Pique	2 Hot 2 Handle	Rotterdam, Netherlands	Decision (unanimous)	5	3:00
2003-11-30	Draw	(Armenia) Gago Drago	Killerdome IV	Amsterdam, Netherlands	Decision draw	5	3:00
2003-09-28	Loss	(Czech Republic) Ondrej Hutnik	Muay Thai Champions League IX	Rotterdam, Netherlands	Decision (unanimous)	5	3:00
2003-05-31	Loss	(Suriname) Marco Pique	Muay Thai Express I	Rotterdam, Netherlands	Decision (unanimous)	5	3:00
Fight was for Dutch Muaythai (72,5kg) title.
2003-03-16	Loss	(Turkey) Şahin Yakut	Ahoy Simply the Best VI	Rotterdam, Netherlands	Decision (unanimous)	5	3:00
2002-10-05	Win	(Netherlands) Nabil Boukhari	Thaiboxing @ Topsportcentrum	Rotterdam, Netherlands	TKO (ref stop/gave up)		
2002-06-08	Loss	(Netherlands) Vincent Vielvoye	W.P.K.L. Muay Thai Champions League VII	Rotterdam, Netherlands	TKO (corner stoppage)	4	
Fight was for Dutch Muaythai (72,5kg) title.
2002-03-22	Win	(Morocco) Anouar Hanin	Muay Thai Champions League VI	Rotterdam, Netherlands	TKO	3	
2002-03-22	Win	(Belarus) Alexei Perdzchik	Muay Thai Champions League VI	Rotterdam, Netherlands	TKO (corner stoppage)	2	
2001-11-04	Win	(Belgium) Chico Swerts	Muay Thai Champions League V	Rotterdam, Netherlands	Decision (unanimous)	5	3:00
2001-03-03	Win	(Netherlands) James Hoever	Muay Thai Champions League IV	Rotterdam, Netherlands	Decision (unanimous)	5	3:00
2000-09-03	Win	(Netherlands) Roel Rink	"Veselic meets Dejpitak"	Arnhem, Netherlands	KO	1	
1999-02-07	Win	(Netherlands) Timmermans	"Matter of Honor"	Rotterdam, Netherlands	TKO (doctor stop/injury)	3	
Legend: Win Loss Draw/no contest Notes

== See also ==
- List of K-1 events
- List of male kickboxers
- List of It's Showtime events
- List of It's Showtime champions
