= Chahid Oulad El Hadj =

Moroccan-Dutch welterweight kickboxer

- Born: 21 June 1988 (age 38); Bergen op Zoom, Netherlands
- Other names: The Pitbull
- Height: 1.70 m (5 ft 7 in)
- Weight: 70 kg (154 lb; 11 st 0 lb)
- Division: Welterweight
- Style: Kickboxing
- Stance: Orthodox
- Fighting out of: Bergen op Zoom, Netherlands
- Team: Plaza Fight Team; Future Gym
- Trainer: Hamid Oulad El Hadj

Kickboxing record
- Total: 60
- Wins: 35
- By knockout: 21
- Losses: 21
- By knockout: 7
- Draws: 3
- No contests: 1
- Last updated on: May 14, 2014

Chahid "The Pitbull" Oulad El Hadj (born 21 June 1988) is a Moroccan-Dutch former welterweight kickboxer.

El Hadj has had successful bouts against fighters such as Gago Drago and Murat Direkçi. El Hadj is trained by his brother Hamid El Hadj.

== Titles ==
- Dutch Champion
- 2006 WFCA Benelux (-70 kg) champion

== Notable fights ==
The K-1 World MAX 2010 Final 16 match between Chahid and the world champion Mike Zambidis on October the 3rd, 2010 is considered as one of the finest during a kickboxing competition.

== Kickboxing record ==
Kickboxing record
38 Wins (12 KO's), 21 Losses, 3 Draws, 1 No Contest
Date	Result	Opponent	Event	Location	Method	Round	Time
2018-09-15	Loss	(Netherlands) Nordin Van Roosmalen	Enfusion 70	Belgium	Decision	3	3:00
2018-05-05	Loss	(Netherlands) Robbie Hageman	A1WCC Champions League Heavyweight Tournament	Belgium	Decision (Unanimous)	3	3:00
2015-10-18	Loss	(Morocco) Mohammed Khamal	WFL "Unfinished Business"	Hoofddorp, Netherlands	KO	2	
2014-05-10	Win	(Estonia) Edvin Kibus	Global Super Events Presents El Hadj vs Kibus	Bergen op Zoom, Netherlands	Decision (Unanimous)	3	
2012-05-27	Loss	(Greece) Mike Zambidis	K-1 World MAX 2012 World Championship Tournament Final 16	Madrid, Spain	KO	3	
2011-11-27	Loss	(Russia) Dzhabar Askerov	Rumble of the Kings 2011	Stockholm, Sweden	TKO (retirement)	1	
2011-09-24	Loss	(Netherlands) Robin van Roosmalen	It's Showtime "Fast & Furious 70MAX", Quarter Finals	Brussels, Belgium	TKO (Corner stoppage)	2	2:40
2011-05-14	NC	(Italy) Giorgio Petrosyan	It's Showtime 2011 Lyon	Lyon, France	No Contest (Low Blow)	3	1:05
2011-03-06	Loss	(Netherlands) Robin van Roosmalen	It's Showtime Sporthallen Zuid	Amsterdam, Netherlands	Decision (Majority)	3	3:00
2010-12-11	Win	(Poland) Rafal Dudek	Yiannis Evgenikos presents: It's Showtime Athens	Athens, Greece	Decision (4–1)	3	3:00
2010-10-03	Loss	(Greece) Mike Zambidis	K-1 World MAX 2010 Final 16 - Part 2	Seoul, South Korea	Ext.R Decision (Unanimous)	4	3:00
Fails to qualify for K-1 World MAX 2010 Final.
2010-06-19	Win	(Turkey) Yavuz Kayabasi	A1 World Combat Cup	Eindhoven, Netherlands	Decision	3	3:00
2010-05-29	Win	(Morocco) Mohammed Khamal	It's Showtime 2010 Amsterdam	Amsterdam, Netherlands	Decision (5–0)	3	3:00
2010-04-10	Win	(South Africa) Warren Stevelmans	Starmuay V	Maastricht, Netherlands	KO	2	
2010-03-13	Loss	(Thailand) Sudsakorn Sor Klinmee	Oktagon presents: It's Showtime 2010	Milan, Italy	Decision (Majority)	3	3:00
2010-01-09	Loss	(Morocco) Hafid el Boustati	Ring Sensation Championships - Uprising 12	Utrecht, Netherlands	Decision (Unanimous)	3	3:00
2009-11-21	Loss	(Democratic Republic of the Congo) Chris Ngimbi	It's Showtime 2009 Barneveld	Barneveld, Netherlands	Decision (Unanimous)	3	3:00
2009-10-24	Loss	(Turkey) Murat Direkci	It's Showtime 2009 Lommel	Lommel, Belgium	TKO (Doc. stop/cut)	1	
Direkci retains his It's Showtime 70MAX World title.
2009-09-25	Loss	(France) Florian Abadie	World kickboxing championship WKN	Paris, France	TKO	2	
2009-06-13	Win	(Netherlands) William Diender	Gentleman Promotion	Tilburg, Netherlands	KO	2	
2009-05-16	Loss	(Netherlands) Andy Souwer	It's Showtime 2009 Amsterdam	Amsterdam, Netherlands	Decision (Unanimous)	3	3:00
2009-04-21	Loss	(Netherlands) Nieky Holzken	K-1 World MAX 2009 Final 16	Fukuoka, Japan	Decision (Majority)	3	3:00
2009-02-08	Win	(Spain) Fermin Rodriguez	Fights at the Border presents: It's Showtime 2009	Antwerp, Belgium	Decision (Unanimous)	3	3:00
2008-11-29	Win	(Armenia) Gago Drago	It's Showtime 2008 Eindhoven	Eindhoven, Netherlands	Decision	3	3:00
2008-10-05	Loss	(Turkey) Ali Gunyar	Tough is not Enough	Rotterdam, Netherlands	Decision (Unanimous)	3	3:00
Fight was for O.P.B.U. K-1 Rules Europe-African title -72.5 kg.
2008-05-24	Win	(Turkey) Murat Direkçi	Gentleman Promotions Fightnight	Tilburg, Netherlands	TKO (Referee stoppage)	3	
2008-04-19	Win	(Turkey) Cagri Ermis	Muay Thai Gala Roosendaal	Roosendaal, Netherlands	Decision (Unanimous)	5	3:00
2008-03-15	Draw	(Armenia) Gago Drago	It's Showtime 75MAX Trophy 2008, Super Fight	's-Hertogenbosch, Netherlands	Decision Draw	5	3:00
2008-01-26	Draw	(South Africa) Warren Stevelmans	Beast of the East	Zutphen, Netherlands	Decision Draw	3	3:00
2007-11-24	Win	(Japan) Koichi Kikuchi	Shootboxing	Rosmalen, Netherlands	Decision	3	3:00
2007-06-02	Loss	(Suriname) Marco Pique	Gentleman Promotions Fightnight IV	Tilburg, Netherlands	Decision	5	3:00
2007-05-06	Loss	(Thailand) Saenchanoi	Slamm 3	Haarlem, Netherlands	Decision	5	3:00
2007-04-07	Win	(Thailand) Samkor Kiatmontep	Balans Fight Night	Tilburg, Netherlands	Decision	5	3:00
2007-01-27	Win	(Netherlands) William Diender	Beast of the East	Zutphen, Netherlands	Decision	3	3:00
2006-12-09	Win	(Netherlands) Peter Hoes	Thaibox Gala	Roosendaal, Netherlands	Decision	5	3:00
2006-11-19	Loss	(Belgium) Jan de Keyzer	Day of Talent 2	Antwerp, Belgium	Disqualification	3	
2006-06-25	Win	(Albania) Valon Basha	Thaibox Gala	Bergen op Zoom, Netherlands	Decision	5	3:00
2006-06-04	Loss	(Morocco) Faldir Chahbari	Gentleman Fightnight III	Tilburg, Netherlands	Decision (Unanimous)	5	3:00
2006-04-09	Win	(Morocco) Said Ait Houhkari	Knock Out Combat 3	Goes, Netherlands	Decision	5	3:00
2006-03-05	Win	(Albania) Arjan Vatnikai	Future Battle	Bergen op Zoom, Netherlands	Decision	5	3:00
Wins WFCA Benelux title (-70kg) title.
2005-11-05	Win	(Morocco) Khalid Lazaar	Thaibox Gala in Breda	Breda, Netherlands	Decision	5	2:00
2005-10-02	Win	(Netherlands) Werner Stoel	Gentleman Fightnight 2	Tilburg, Netherlands	TKO (Referee stoppage)	5	
2005-07-16	Loss	(Netherlands) Marvin Sansaar	Thaibox Gala	Zwolle, Netherlands	KO (Spinning Heel Kick)	3	
2005-06-18	Win	(Germany) Alexander Kreuger	Showdome IV	Amsterdam, Netherlands	Decision	5	2:00
2005-05-22	Win	(Netherlands) Malik van Kampen	Thaibox Gala	Goes, Netherlands	Decision	5	2:00
2005-04-16	Win	(Denmark) Djiit Thanomrat	The Battle Zone	Breda, Netherlands	TKO	5	
2005-01-31	Win	(Morocco) Karim El Jouharti	Time for Action	Nijmegen, Netherlands	Decision	5	2:00
2005-01-01	Win	(Netherlands) Sammie Panius	Thaiboxing Gala	Breda, Netherlands	Decision	5	2:00
2004-09-04	Win	(Iran) Reza Tuwannakotta	Last Man Standing	Eindhoven, Netherlands	Decision	5	2:00
2003-11-16	Win	(Portugal) Gino de Los Santos	Only the Strongest Survives	Rhoon, Netherlands	Decision	5	2:00
Legend: Win Loss Draw/No contest Notes

== See also ==
- List of K-1 events
- List of male kickboxers
- Muay Thai
