= Shemsi Beqiri =

Albanian kickboxer

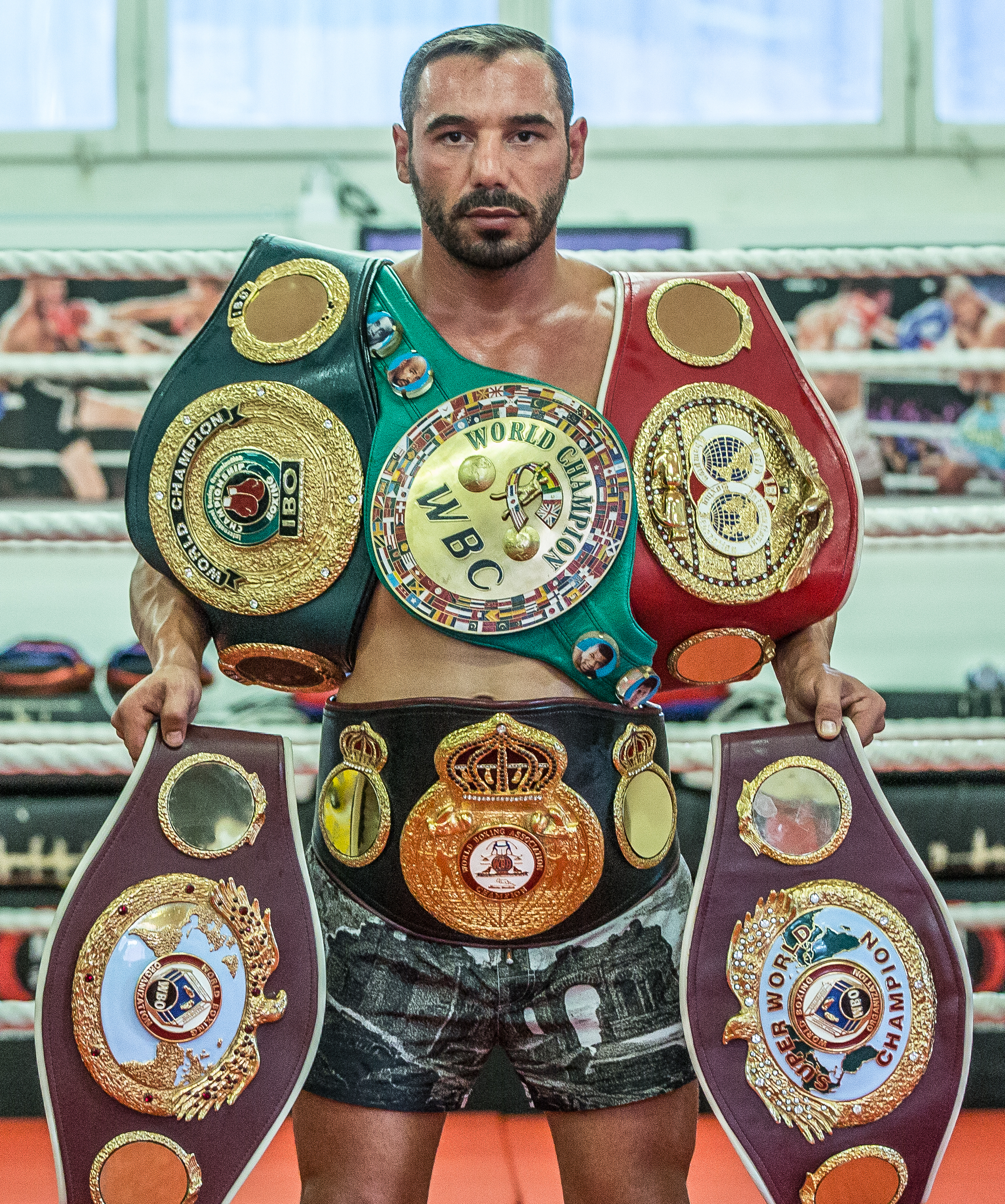
- Born: 3 May 1986 (age 40); Vitina, SAP Kosovo, SFR Yugoslavia
- Nationality: Swiss
- Height: 1.75 m (5 ft 9 in)
- Weight: 70.0 kg (154.3 lb; 11.02 st)
- Division: Lightweight; Welterweight; Middleweight
- Style: Kickboxing • Muay Thai
- Stance: Orthodox
- Fighting out of: Basel, Switzerland
- Team: Golden Dragon Gym; Diamond Gym; SuperPro Sportcenter Basel (2010–present)
- Trainer: Daniel Born; Dennis Krauweel (2010–present)
- Years active: 2002–2017

Kickboxing record
- Total: 96
- Wins: 87
- By knockout: 32
- Losses: 9
- By knockout: 1
- Draws: 0

Other information
- Website: https://www.teambeqiri.ch/
- Last updated on: 24 January 2017

Shemsi Beqiri (born 3 May 1986) is a Swiss former kickboxer who competed in the middleweight division.

== Early life ==
A Swiss citizen, Beqiri was born to Kosovar Albanian parents in Vitina, SFR Yugoslavia (now Kosovo) on 3 May 1986, and, at the age of five, he relocated with his family to Basel, Switzerland where he soon began training in karate and taekwondo. He took up kickboxing and Muay Thai when he was sixteen. He was naturalized as a Swiss citizen. His three brothers, Hysni, Ilir and Sabedin, were also professional kickboxers. Hysni and Sabedin continue to fight, but Ilir died from leukaemia in 2015 at 21 years old.

== Career ==
=== Early career (2002–2008) ===
Beqiri began his career at Super Pro Basel and moved to Superpro Sportcenter Basel in 2002, fighting as a lightweight. Two years after beginning fighting, he won his first title by defeating Jetmir Sula via decision to win the World Professional Kickboxing Council (WPKC) Swiss -63.5 kg/140 lb Muay Thai Championship in his hometown of Basel, Switzerland on 8 May 2004. He then travelled to Novara, Italy just three weeks later to challenge Alessandro Conca for the WPKC European -63.5 kg/140 lb International Kickboxing title, and beat the local fighter on points after seven, two-minute rounds to become the European champion.

Beqiri ended 2004 by becoming the Swiss champion for the second time, knocking out Dardan Zeqiri in round three to take the Schweizerische Kick-Boxing Verbände (SKBV) Swiss -63.5 kg/140 lb Kickboxing belt on 13 November 2004. After accumulating an undefeated record fighting on the European kickboxing and Muay Thai circuit, his first loss came at the hands of Giorgio Petrosyan in a Muay Thai Association (MTA) European -65 kg/143 lb title fight in Gorizia, Italy on 26 February 2005.

On 18 February 2006, Beqiri entered the S-1 Muay Thai tournament held in Basel. He KO'd Zyber Rudaj in the quarter-finals and then beat Steve Neumann on points in the semis. However, he sustained an injury in the match with Neumann and was unable to compete in the final. He faced another setback when he dropped a decision to Mirko Vorkapic in Nova Gorica, Slovenia on 10 June 2006, but he bounced back with a lengthy win streak that culminated in winning the World Fighters Council (WFC) European Welterweight (-67 kg/147 lb) K-1 rules title from Andrej Bruhl in Basel on 15 December 2007.

He made the first defence of his WFC European title on 2 August 2008, when he bested Hubert Romankiewitz over three rounds in Basel.

=== Arrival on the world stage (2008–2012) ===
Having become two-time European champion, Beqiri was given the chance to fight for a world title on 15 November 2008, taking on Vahidin Tufekčić in Nova Gorica with the WKA World Welterweight (-67 kg/147 lb) Kickboxing Championship on the line. He proved that he belonged on the world stage by sending the Bosnian to the canvas in the first round before stopping him with a low kick in the second to take the belt.

Shortly thereafter, Beqiri began his transition to middleweight, long seen as kickboxing's deepest weight class. He faced the toughest test of his career on 14 March 2009, by taking on Şahin Yakut at Oktagon presents: It's Showtime 2009 in Milan, Italy. He was easily out-gunned by the Turkish veteran, receiving a standing eight count from the referee just seconds in the bout before being finished off with a right hook shortly after. He was able to return to the winner's column in impressive fashion by taking decision wins over Bartosz Kościelniak, Youssef Ouahnini and Ramil Karmacaev, respectively, in one night to win the -72.5 kg/160 lb tournament at Human's Fight Night III in Hamburg, Germany on 13 September 2009. Beqiri then attempted to make it two tournament wins on the trot by entering the TK2 World MAX 2009 in Aix-en-Provence, France on 10 October 2009, but was beaten on points by Jeremy Sportouch at the quarter-final stage. Before the year was done, he added two more world titles to his mantlepiece, knocking out familiar foe Jimmy Eimers in four rounds in Ulm, Germany on 1 November 2009, to take the World Full Contact Association (WFCA) World Junior Middleweight (-69.8 kg/154 lb) Thaiboxing belt followed by a points win over Mike's Gym fighter Giga Chikadze on 19 December 2009, in Zurich, Switzerland to be crowned the WFC World Middleweight (-72.5 kg/160 lb) Muay Thai Champion.

2010 was a busy and successful year for Beqiri as he competed in four one-night tournaments and went 10–2 over the course of the twelve months. He also began training under Dutchman Dennis Krauweel at the SuperPro Sportcenter Basel around this time after switching for the Golden Dragon Gym. He kicked the year off on 30 January 2010, at the Klash I -72.5 kg/160 lb Tournament in Zutphen, Netherlands where he knocked out Adem Bozkurt at the opening stage. In the semi-finals, he went up against Arian Vatnikaj and dropped him in round one en route to a decisive points victory. Then, in the tournament final, Beqiri edged out Alviar Lima over three rounds to take the crown. In his next outing, Beqiri captured the WKA World Middleweight (-72.5 kg/159 lb) Kickboxing title with a decision win over Diogo Calado in Basel on 27 March 2010. He followed this up with a third-round TKO of Dardan Morina in the quarter-finals of the Superfighters 8 Man Tournament in Frankfurt, Germany on 17 April 2010. Despite securing his place in the semis, he was unable to compete due to a broken nose and was replaced by Davit Kiria.

On 5 September 2010, Beqiri returned to defend his crown at Human's Fight Night IV in Hamburg. Having taken a unanimous decision victory over Rosario Presti in the quarter-finals, he then exited the competition when he lost by the same margin to local fighter Dima Weimer in what was the fight of the tournament. In his fourth and final tournament run of the year, Beqiri finished as runner-up at the Klash II -72.5 kg/160 lb Tournament in Sindelfingen, Germany on 27 November 2010. He was victorious on points over Turkish duo Erkan Varol and Tevfik Suçu to reach the final where he lost a close split decision to Faldir Chahbari.

After rising up the rankings in 2010, Beqiri began his 2011 campaign by taking a big step up in class to face Yoshihiro Sato, who had finished as runner-up in the K-1 World MAX 2010 Tournament just two months before, at the Krush First Generation King Tournaments ~Round.2~ in Tokyo, Japan on 9 January 2011. Sato took a controversial split decision (30–28, 29–28, 28–29), but many considered the fight a moral victory for the 24-year-old Beqiri who was more than twenty places below Sato in the world rankings and fighting outside Europe for the first time. He did not return to the ring until 10 September 2011, when he participated in the four-man, SuperPro Fight Night II -70 kg/154 lb tournament in Basel. After his original semi-finals opponent Farid Villaume pulled out, Beqiri instead took on Philippe Salmon and dropped the Frenchman in round one before taking the judges verdict to advance to the final where he came up against Rachid Belani. He had no problems with the aging Moroccan and won by decision to take the tournament prize money of €20,000.

Beqiri became a five-time world champion on 3 March 2012, when he outpointed Hirono Yuu over five rounds for the WFCA World Junior Middleweight (-69.8 kg/154 lb) K-1 title at SuperPro Fight Night III in Basel.

=== Glory (2012–present) ===
Although contracts with top promotions such as K-1 and It's Showtime seemed to have eluded Beqiri. He was given the chance to fight at the highest level when he signed with the newly founded Glory organization in April 2012 and was immediately entered into the 2012 Lightweight Slam tournament, made up of sixteen of the world's best 70 kg/154 lb kickfighters. He was given a rematch with Yoshihiro Sato at the tournament's opening round, held in Stockholm, Sweden at Glory 1: Stockholm - 2012 Lightweight Slam First 16 on 26 May 2012, and took his revenge by beating the Japanese fighter by split decision in an action-packed fight. This win helped Beqiri move up into the top ten in the world rankings for the first time in his career, coming in at #10.

Staying active between Glory tournament bouts, he defeated Steeve Valente via decision at SuperPro Fight Night IV on 22 September 2012, in Basel to win the SuperPro Fight Night -70 kg/154 lb Championship.

He was drawn against Davit Kiria in the quarter-finals of the 2012 Glory tournament at Glory 3: Rome - 2012 Lightweight Slam Final 8 on 3 November 2012, in Rome, Italy but exited the tournament early when he lost a split decision after a competitive fight. Despite coming back from the Glory tournament empty-handed, Beqiri proved himself to be amongst the middleweight elite and moved up to #9 in the world rankings in December 2012.

Beqiri lost to Robin van Roosmalen by unanimous decision in a back-and-forth fight at Glory 10: Los Angeles in Ontario, California, United States on 28 September 2013.

He was scheduled to face Ky Hollenbeck in the tournament reserve match at Glory 12: New York - Lightweight World Championship Tournament in New York City, New York, US on 23 November 2013 but withdrew for undisclosed reasons and was replaced by Warren Stevelmans.

Shemsi Beqiri and Andy Souwer were set to fight at SuperPro Fight Night VI in Basel on 25 January 2014, but Souwer withdrew due to a bout of appendicitis and was replaced by Foad Sadeghi. Beqiri defeated Sadeghi on points.

He was also expected to fight Murthel Groenhart on the Glory 14: Zagreb undercard in Zagreb, Croatia on 8 March 2014 withdrew due to injuries sustained in a brawl and was replaced by Teo Mikelić.

== Personal life ==
In February 2013, Beqiri was convicted for assault by a Basel court. In an incident in January 2012, he had hit a man in the face and went on to kick him when he went to the ground, after Beqiri's brother had first attacked the victim, also a kickboxer, with pepper spray. Beqiri's conviction made headlines in Swiss media in the context of a scandal involving the canton of Zurich employing him as personal trainer for a juvenile offender convicted for serious bodily harm. After Beqiri's conviction became public knowledge, his expulsion from the Swiss Muay Thai Federation was announced. Beqiri contradicted this, saying that he had planned leave the federation regardless and that the notice of expulsion was motivated by the federation taking sides against him in his ongoing rivalry with his former trainer, Portuguese kickboxer Paulo Balicha.

On 24 February 2014, Beqiri's gym was raided by Balicha and about twenty masked and partly armed associates. Beqiri claimed that Balicha attacked him with brass knuckles and that he struck him down in self-defense. In the resulting brawl, partly fought with baseball bats, six people were injured, including Beqiri who sustained fractures in his hand and nose. Balicha was arrested and after forensic analysis at his Diamond Gym, a number of other attackers were also identified and taken into custody. Beqiri's injuries sustained in the attack prevented him from fighting Murthel Groenhart at Glory 14: Zagreb.

== Championships and awards ==
=== Kickboxing ===
- Human's Fight Night
  - Human's Fight Night III -72.5 kg/160 lb Tournament Championship
- Klash
  - Klash I -72.5 kg/160 lb Tournament Championship
  - Klash II -72.5 kg/160 lb Tournament runner-up
- S-1
  - 2006 S-1 -72.5 kg/160 lb Tournament runner-up
- Schweizerische Kick-Boxing Verbände
  - SKBV Swiss -63.5 kg/140 lb Kickboxing Championship (one time)
- SuperPro Fight Night
  - SuperPro Fight Night II -70 kg/154 lb Tournament Championship
  - SuperPro Fight Night -70 kg/154 lb Championship (five times)
- World Fighters Council
  - WFC European Welterweight (-67 kg/147 lb) K-1 Championship (three times)
  - Three Successful title defence
  - WFC World Middleweight (-72.5 kg/160 lb) Muay Thai Championship (two times)
- World Full Contact Association
  - WFCA World Junior Middleweight (-69.8 kg/154 lb) Thaiboxing Championship (five times)
  - WFCA World Junior Middleweight (-69.8 kg/154 lb) K-1 Championship (four times)
- World Kickboxing Association
  - WKA World Welterweight (-67 kg/147 lb) Kickboxing Championship (one time)
  - WKA World Middleweight (-72.5 kg/159.8 lb) Kickboxing Championship (one time)
- World Professional Kickboxing Council
  - WPKC Swiss -63.5 kg/140 lb Muay Thai Championship (one time)
  - WPKC Interconintinetal -66 kg/140 lb Kickboxing Championship (one time)
  - WPKC European -63.5 kg/140 lb Kickboxing Championship (one time)

== Kickboxing record ==
Kickboxing record
85 wins (32 KOs), 9 losses, 0 draws
| Date | Result | Opponent | Event | Location | Method | Round | Time |
| 2018-09-29 | Win | (Denmark) Mohammed El-Mir | Superpro Fight Night 8 | Basel, Switzerland | Decision | 3 | 3:00 |
SPFN World Junior Middleweight (-72.5 kg/154 lb) K-1 Championship.
| 2018-07-28 | Win | (Serbia) Vanja Dumitrov | Superpro Fight Night Uskana 1 | Kičevo, Macedonia | KO | 1 | 3:00 |
| 2016-12-03 | Win | (Turkey) Erkan Varol | Mix Fight Gala 20 | Frankfurt, Germany | Decision | 3 | 3:00 |
| 2016-03-12 | Win | (Netherlands) William Diender | Superpro Fight Night 7 | Basel, Switzerland | Decision | 3 | 3:00 |
Wins the SPFN World Junior Middleweight (-72.5 kg/154 lb) K-1 Championship.
| 2014-11-30 | Win | (Russia) Alexander Surzhko | W5 Crossroad of Times, Semi Finals | Bratislava, Slovakia | Decision | 3 | 3:00 |
Could not advance to the final due to a hand injury.
| 2014-01-24 | Win | (Iran) Foad Sadeghi | SuperPro Fight Night 6 | Basel, Switzerland | Decision | 5 | 3:00 |
Wins the WFCA World Junior Middleweight (-72.5 kg/154 lb) K-1 Championship.
| 2013-09-28 | Loss | (Netherlands) Robin van Roosmalen | Glory 10: Los Angeles | Ontario, California, USA | Decision (unanimous) | 3 | 3:00 |
| 2012-11-03 | Loss | (Georgia (country)) Davit Kiria | Glory 3: Rome - 70 kg Slam Tournament, Quarter Finals | Rome, Italy | Decision (split) | 3 | 3:00 |
| 2012-09-22 | Win | (France) Steeve Valente | SuperPro Fight Night 4 | Basel, Switzerland | Decision | 5 | 3:00 |
Wins the WFCA World Junior Middleweight (-70.00 kg/154 lb) K-1 Championship.
| 2012-05-26 | Win | (Japan) Yoshihiro Sato | Glory 1: Stockholm - 70 kg Slam Tournament, First Round | Stockholm, Sweden | Decision (split) | 3 | 3:00 |
| 2012-03-03 | Win | (Japan) Hirono Yuu | SuperPro Fight Night 3 | Basel, Switzerland | Decision | 5 | 3:00 |
Wins the WFCA World Junior Middleweight (-69.85 kg/154 lb) K-1 Championship.
| 2011-09-10 | Win | (Morocco) Rachid Belani | SuperPro Fight Night 2, Final | Basel, Switzerland | Decision (unanimous) | 3 | 3:00 |
Wins the SuperPro Fight Night II -70 kg/154 lb Tournament Championship.
| 2011-09-10 | Win | (France) Philippe Salmon | SuperPro Fight Night 2, Semi Final | Basel, Switzerland | Decision (unanimous) | 3 | 3:00 |
| 2011-01-09 | Loss | (Japan) Yoshihiro Sato | Krush First Generation King Tournaments ~Round.2~ | Tokyo, Japan | Decision (split) | 3 | 3:00 |
| 2010-11-27 | Loss | (Morocco) Faldir Chahbari | Mix Fight Gala 11: Klash II Tournament, Final | Sindelfingen, Germany | Decision (split) | 3 | 3:00 |
For the Klash II -72.5 kg/160 lb Tournament Championship.
| 2010-11-27 | Win | (Turkey) Tevfik Suçu | Mix Fight Gala 11: Klash II Tournament, Semi Finals | Sindelfingen, Germany | Decision | 3 | 3:00 |
| 2010-11-27 | Win | (Turkey) Erkan Varol | Mix Fight Gala 11: Klash II Tournament, Quarter Finals | Sindelfingen, Germany | Decision | 3 | 3:00 |
| 2010-10-09 | Win | (Germany) Alexander Schmitt | Mix Fight Gala 10 | Darmstadt, Germany | Decision | 3 | 3:00 |
| 2010-09-05 | Loss | (Germany) Dima Weimer | Human's Fight Night IV, Semi Finals | Hamburg, Germany | Decision (unanimous) | 3 | 3:00 |
| 2010-09-05 | Win | (Italy) Rosario Presti | Human's Fight Night IV, Quarter Finals | Hamburg, Germany | Decision (unanimous) | 3 | 3:00 |
| 2010-06-12 | Win | (Poland) Łukasz Szulc | Beast of the East 2 | Gdańsk, Poland | Decision | 3 | 3:00 |
| 2010-04-17 | Win | (Germany) Dardan Morina | Superfighters 8 Man Tournament, Quarter Finals | Frankfurt, Germany | KO | 3 | |
Despite reaching the semi-finals, Beqiri withdrew from tournament due to a broken nose.
| 2010-03-27 | Win | (Portugal) Diogo Calado | WKA Gala Night | Basel, Switzerland | Decision | 5 | 3:00 |
Wins the WKA World Middleweight (-72.5 kg/159.8 lb) Kickboxing Championship.
| 2010-01-30 | Win | (Cape Verde) Alviar Lima | Beast of the East: Klash I Tournament, Final | Zutphen, Netherlands | Decision | 3 | 3:00 |
Wins the Klash I -72.5 kg/160 lb Tournament Championship.
| 2010-01-30 | Win | (Albania) Arian Vatnikaj | Beast of the East: Klash I Tournament, Semi Finals | Zutphen, Netherlands | Decision | 3 | 3:00 |
| 2010-01-30 | Win | (Turkey) Adem Bozkurt | Beast of the East: Klash I Tournament, Quarter Finals | Zutphen, Netherlands | KO | 3 | |
| 2009-12-19 | Win | (Georgia (country)) Giga Chikadze | WFC Fight Night | Zurich, Switzerland | Decision | 5 | 3:00 |
Wins the WFC World Middleweight (-72.5 kg/160 lb) Muay Thai Championship.
| 2009-12-05 | Win | (Turkey) Tevfik Sucu | Mix Fight Gala 9 | Darmstadt, Germany | Decision | 3 | 3:00 |
| 2009-11-21 | Win | (Bosnia and Herzegovina) Vedad Mulaomerović | Gladiators Fight Night | Pristina, Kosovo | TKO (corner stoppage) | 1 | 2:59 |
| 2009-11-01 | Win | (Netherlands) Jimmy Eimers | Hype FC | Ulm, Germany | KO | 4 | |
Wins the WFCA World Junior Middleweight (-69.85 kg/154 lb) Thaiboxing Championship.
| 2009-10-10 | Loss | (France) Jeremy Sportouch | TK2 World MAX 2009, Quarter Finals | Aix-en-Provence, France | Decision (split) | 3 | 2:00 |
| 2009-09-13 | Win | (Russia) Ramil Karmacaev | Human's Fight Night III, Final | Hamburg, Germany | Decision | 4 | 3:00 |
Wins the Human's Fight Night III -72.5 kg/160 lb Tournament Championship.
| 2009-09-13 | Win | (Morocco) Youssef Ouahnini | Human's Fight Night III, Semi Finals | Hamburg, Germany | Decision | 3 | 3:00 |
| 2009-09-13 | Win | (Poland) Bartosz Kościelniak | Human's Fight Night III, Quarter Finals | Hamburg, Germany | Decision | 3 | 3:00 |
| 2009-03-14 | Loss | (Turkey) Şahin Yakut | Oktagon presents: It's Showtime 2009 | Milan, Italy | TKO (right hook) | 1 | 0:45 |
| 2008-11-30 | Win | (Germany) Thilo Schneider | The Contender Qualifikation | Basel, Switzerland | Decision | 3 | 3:00 |
| 2008-11-15 | Win | (Bosnia and Herzegovina) Vahidin Tufekčić | WKA Champions Night | Nova Gorica, Slovenia | KO (right low kick) | 2 | |
Wins the WKA World Welterweight (-67 kg/147.7 lb) Kickboxing Championship.
| 2008-10-04 | Win | (Switzerland) Mikel Colaj | K-1 Fight Night | Sursee, Switzerland | Decision | 3 | 3:00 |
| 2008-08-02 | Win | (Germany) Hubert Romankiewitz | Swiss Las Vegas 3 | Basel, Switzerland | Decision | 3 | 3:00 |
Retains the WFC European Welterweight (-67 kg/147 lb) K-1 Championship.
| 2008-07-06 | Win | (Netherlands) Jimmy Eimers | Ultimate Glory 8 | Nijmegen, Netherlands | Decision | 3 | 3:00 |
| 2007-12-15 | Win | (Russia) Andrej Brühl | Swiss Las Vegas 2 | Basel, Switzerland | Decision | 3 | 3:00 |
Wins the WFC European Welterweight (-67 kg/147 lb) K-1 Championship.
| 2007-10-06 | Win | (Croatia) Nikola Božić | Satori Gladiatorium Nemesis | Nova Gorica, Slovenia | Decision | 4 | |
| 2007-06-03 | Win | (Romania) Viorel Rădoi | Night of Revenge | Luzern, Switzerland | KO | 3 | |
| 2007-05-12 | Win | (Germany) Steve Neumann | Swiss Las Vegas 1 | Basel, Switzerland | Decision | 3 | 3:00 |
| 2007-01-27 | Win | (Netherlands) Adil Ait Ali | Rayong Dreamfights | Giengen, Germany | Decision | 5 | 3:00 |
| 2006-06-10 | Loss | (Slovenia) Mirko Vorkapić | Mittel Europe Tournament | Nova Gorica, Slovenia | Decision | 3 | 3:00 |
| 2006-02-18 | Win | (Germany) Steve Neumann | S-1 Tournament, Semi Finals | Basel, Switzerland | Decision | 3 | 3:00 |
Despite reaching the final, Beqiri withdrew from tournament due to injury.
| 2006-02-18 | Win | (Switzerland) Zyber Rudaj | S-1 Tournament, Quarter Finals | Basel, Switzerland | KO (right cross) | 3 | |
| 2005-02-26 | Loss | (Italy) Giorgio Petrosyan | Muay Thai A. Gotti | Gorizia, Italy | Decision | 5 | |
For the MTA European -65 kg/143 lb Championship.
| 2004-11-13 | Win | (Switzerland) Dardan Zeqiri | Swiss Kickboxing Finals | Switzerland | KO | 3 | |
Wins the SKBV Swiss -63.5 kg/140 lb Kickboxing Championship.
| 2004-10-30 | Win | (Thailand) Nungjakkawan Windy | The Night of the Gladiators | Kaiserslautern, Germany | Decision | 5 | 3:00 |
| 2004-05-29 | Win | (Italy) Alessandro Conca | The Night of the Dragons | Novara, Italy | Decision | 7 | 2:00 |
Wins the WPKC European -63.5 kg/140 lb Kickboxing Championship.
| 2004-05-08 | Win | (Switzerland) Jetmir Sula | Fight of the Titans 2 | Basel, Switzerland | Decision | 5 | 3:00 |
Wins the WPKC Swiss -63.5 kg/140 lb Muay Thai Championship.
| 2000-00-00 | Win | (Germany) Markus Paul | Championsnight | Wipperfürth, Germany | Decision | 3 | 2:00 |
Legend: Win Loss Draw/no contest Notes
