= Faldir Chahbari =

Moroccan-Dutch welterweight kickboxer

- Born: August 30, 1979 (age 47); Ijarmauas, Morocco
- Native name: ⴼⴰⵍⴷⵉⵔ ⵛⴰⵀⴱⴰⵔⵉ
- Other names: Fast
- Nationality: Moroccan; Dutch
- Height: 1.81 m (5 ft 11 in)
- Weight: 70 kg (154 lb; 11 st 0 lb)
- Division: Welterweight
- Style: Kickboxing, Muay Thai
- Fighting out of: Brummen, Netherlands
- Team: KB Brummen; Team Beast of the East
- Trainer: Kenneth Macnack/Wim Scharrenberg
- Years active: 1997–present

Kickboxing record
- Total: 117
- Wins: 101
- By knockout: 24
- Losses: 12
- Draws: 4
- Last updated on: December 15, 2013

"Fast" Faldir Chahbari (Riffian-Berber: ⴼⴰⵍⴷⵉⵔ ⵛⴰⵀⴱⴰⵔⵉ; born August 30, 1979) is a Moroccan-Dutch former welterweight kickboxer who fought out of Morocco. He a x2 Muay Thai amateur world champion and is the former (and first ever) World Full Contact Association (W.F.C.A.) Thai-boxing junior middleweight world champion.

== Biography ==
Faldir Chahbari began boxing at the Kickboxing brummen gym in 1994, and started in youth matches 2 years later. Trained at the time by Kenneth Macnack, he now has his own gym giving training sessions in Zutphen and Apeldoorn. He has only one functioning eye, after losing the use of the other eye in an accident as a child.

== Career ==
Chahbari spent most of his early career fighting in the Netherlands. He won his first major title at the Battle of Arnhem II event in 2001 where he won the I.K.B.O. European title. He followed up this victory by winning the W.P.K.L. Dutch national title the very next year. In 2004 he added another national title to his resume, this time with the W.F.C.A., following up with the European version in 2005 with a win against the talented knockout specialist Murat Direkçi. Between the years 2000 and 2006 he picked up some decent wins, defeating the likes of Marco Piqué and Gago Drago and retained his W.P.K.L. and W.F.C.A. national and European titles in other bouts. He also had a successful amateur career, winning two gold medals at the W.M.F. world championships held in Bangkok, Thailand and a silver at the W.A.K.O world championships held in Agadir, Morocco.

In 2006 Chahbari entered the K-1 MAX Netherlands 2006 in a bid to qualify for a reserve fight at the K-1 World MAX 2006 Final, He made his way through to the K-1 MAX Netherlands final in Utrecht but had his dreams of a flight to Yokohama scuppered by the experienced Rayen Simson who defeated him after an extension round. The following year he retained his W.F.C.A. European title by knocking out Chris Venrooij with a knee after just 15 seconds. Although he had missed out on a place at the K-1 MAX final the previous year, Chahbari did make his way to Japan where he took part in a number of Shoot Boxing events in Tokyo, winning one and losing one. In 2008, as W.F.C.A. European champion he met multiple world champion Albert Kraus, defeating him over five rounds to become the first ever W.F.C.A. world title holder at junior middleweight (under 70 kg). He held on to the belt until early 2010 when he lost to the highly decorated Andy Souwer who became the new champion. Since 2006 he has suffered more defeats as the competition has got tougher, losing to the likes of Buakaw Por. Pramuk and Giorgio Petrosyan, but has still shown himself to be a contender winning a KlasH tournament late in 2010 by defeating Shemsi Beqiri.

== Titles ==
Professional

- Mix Fight Championship
  - 2010 Mix Fight Gala 11 - KlasH tournament champion -72.5 kg
- World Full Contact Association
  - 2008-10 W.F.C.A. Thai-boxing world champion -69.85 kg (1 title defence)
  - 2006 K-1 MAX Netherlands 2006 runner up -70 kg
  - 2004-07 W.F.C.A. Thai-boxing European champion -69.85 kg
  - 2004-07 W.F.C.A. Thai-boxing Dutch champion -69.85 kg
- World Professional Kickboxing League
  - 2002-03 W.P.K.L. Thai-boxing Dutch champion -67 kg
- International Kickboxing Organization
  - 2001 I.K.B.O. Thai-boxing European champion -67 kg

Amateur

- 2005 W.A.K.O. World Championships in Agadir, Morocco (silver) -71 kg (Thai-boxing)
- 2005 W.M.F. World Championships (gold) -70 kg (Muay Thai)
- 2003 W.M.F. World Championships (gold) -67 kg (Muay Thai)

== Kickboxing record ==
Kickboxing record
80 wins (23 (T)KOs), 12 losses, 3 draws, 1 no contest
Date	Result	Opponent	Event	Location	Method	Round	Time
2013-04-13	Win	(Croatia) Goran Borović	Beast of the East	Zutphen, Netherlands	Decision	5	3:00
Wins King of the Ring Muay Thai rules world title -72.5 kg.
2013-02-17	Win	(Spain) Antonio Gomez		Arnhem, Netherlands	Decision	3	3:00
2012-05-27	Win	(Thailand) Bovy Sor Udomson	SLAMM: Nederland vs. Thailand VII	Almere, Netherlands	Decision (unanimous)	5	3:00
2011-11-19	Win	(Germany) Omar Amrani	SUPERKOMBAT World Grand Prix 2011 Final	Darmstadt, Germany	Decision (unanimous)	3	3:00
2011-04-23	Win	(Republic of Ireland) Anthony Kane	Beast of the East 2011 Zutphen	Zutphen, Netherlands	Decision (unanimous)	3	3:00
2010-11-27	Win	(Albania) Shemsi Beqiri	Mix Fight Gala 11, Final	Sindelfingen, Germany	Decision (split)	3	3:00
Wins KlasH 8-man tournament -72.5 kg.
2010-11-27	Win	(Albania) Arian Vatnikaj	Mix Fight Gala 11, Semi Finals	Sindelfingen, Germany	KO (knee strike)	3	
2010-11-27	Win	(Germany) Omar Amrani	Mix Fight Gala 11, Quarter Finals	Sindelfingen, Germany	Decision (unanimous)	3	3:00
2010-06-12	Loss	(Sweden) Marcus Öberg	Beast of the East 2010 Poland	Gdynia, Poland	Ext.R decision (unanimous)	4	3:00
2010-01-30	Loss	(Netherlands) Andy Souwer	Beast of the East 2010 Zutphen	Zutphen, Netherlands	Decision	5	3:00
Loses W.F.C.A. Thai-boxing junior middleweight world title -69.85 kg.
2009-11-08	Draw	(Netherlands) Leroy Kaestner	Heroes Fight Event	Apeldoorn, Netherlands	Decision draw	3	3:00
2009-10-17	Loss	(Netherlands) Nieky Holzken	Ultimate Glory 11: A Decade of Fights	Amsterdam, Netherlands	Ext.R decision (unanimous)	4	3:00
2009-07-25	Win	(Portugal) Ricardo Fernandes	Night of the Stars	Tetouan, Morocco	Decision	3	3:00
2009-06-13	Win	(Morocco) Hafid el Boustati	Gentlemen Fight Night 6	Tilburg, Netherlands	Decision (unanimous)	3	3:00
2009-05-16	Loss	(Italy) Giorgio Petrosyan	It's Showtime 2009 Amsterdam	Amsterdam, Netherlands	Decision (unanimous)	3	3:00
2009-01-24	Win	(Germany) Mohammed Gur	Beast of the East 2009	Zutphen, Netherlands	Decision	3	3:00
Retains W.F.C.A. Thai-boxing junior middleweight world title -69.85 kg.
2008-11-29	Win	(Thailand) Orono Wor Petchpun	It's Showtime 2008 Eindhoven	Eindhoven, Netherlands	Decision (majority)	3	3:00
2008-07-06	Win	(Georgia (country)) Davit Kiria	Ultimate Glory 8	Nijmegen, Netherlands	TKO (doc. stop./cut)	2	
2008-04-26	Loss	(Thailand) Buakaw Por. Pramuk	K-1 World GP 2008 Amsterdam, Super Fight	Amsterdam, Netherlands	Decision (split)	3	3:00
2008-03-15	Draw	(Turkey) Murat Direkçi	It's Showtime 75MAX Trophy Final 2008, Super Fight	's-Hertogenbosch, Netherlands	Decision draw	5	3:00
2008-01-26	Win	(Netherlands) Albert Kraus	Beast of the East 2008	Zutphen, Netherlands	Decision	5	3:00
Wins vacant W.F.C.A. Thai-boxing junior middleweight world title -69.85 kg.
2007-11-24	NC	(Turkey) Ali Gunyar	Shootboxing in the Autotron	Rosmalen, Netherlands	No contest	3	3:00
2007-10-28	Loss	(Japan) Kazunori Yokota	Shootboxing Battle Summit Ground Zero	Tokyo, Japan	Decision	3	3:00
2007-06-02	Win	(Belgium) Jan van Denderen	Gentlemen Fight Night 2007	Tilburg, Netherlands	Decision	5	3:00
2007-02-25	Win	(Japan) Taiga Yamaguchi	Shoot Boxing Warriors 2007 MU-SO 1	Tokyo, Japan	Decision (unanimous)	3	3:00
2007-01-27	Win	(Netherlands) Chris van Venrooij	Beast of the East 2007	Zutphen, Netherlands	KO (knee)	1	0:15
Retains W.F.C.A. Thai-boxing junior middleweight European title -69.85 kg.
2006-12-09	Win	(Suriname) Rayen Simson		Roosendaal, Netherlands	TKO (corner stoppage)	3	
2006-11-12	Win	(Turkey) Ali Gunyar	2H2H: Pride & Honor	Rotterdam, Netherlands	Decision (unanimous)	5	3:00
2006-06-04	Win	(Morocco) Chahid Oulad El Hadj	Gentleman Fightnight III	Tilburg, Netherlands	Decision (unanimous)	5	3:00
2006-04-08	Win	(Croatia) Frane Radnic	Beast of the East 2006	Zutphen, Netherlands	Decision (unanimous)	5	3:00
2006-03-26	Loss	(Suriname) Rayen Simson	K-1 MAX Netherlands 2006, Final	Utrecht, Netherlands	Ext.R decision	4	3:00
Fight was for K-1 MAX Netherlands 2006 tournament -70 kg. Fails to qualify for reserve fight at K-1 World MAX 2006 Final.
2006-03-26	Win	(Netherlands) William Diender	K-1 MAX Netherlands 2006, Semi Finals	Utrecht, Netherlands	Decision	3	3:00
2006-03-26	Win	(Netherlands) Menno Dijkstra	K-1 MAX Netherlands 2006, Quarter Finals	Utrecht, Netherlands	Decision	3	3:00
2006-02-25	Win	(Japan) Hisayuki Kanazawa	Rising Sun 7	Beilen, Netherlands	KO	1	
2006-02-04	Win	(Armenia) Gago Drago	WFCA Gala	Roosendaal, Netherlands	Decision (unanimous)	5	3:00
2006-01-31	Win	(Morocco) Hamid El Caid	Time For Action	Nijmegen, Netherlands	TKO	2	
Retains W.F.C.A. Thai-boxing junior middleweight Dutch title -69.85 kg.
2005-11-13	Win	(Turkey) Murat Direkçi	WFCA Thai-Kickbox Gala	Nijmegen, Netherlands	Decision (unanimous)	5	3:00
Wins W.F.C.A. Thai-boxing junior middleweight European title -69.85 kg.
2005-10-02	Win	(Netherlands) Melvin Rozenblad	The Battle of Arnhem IV	Arnhem, Netherlands	Decision	5	3:00
2005-04-09	Win	(Netherlands) Roel Rink	Beast of the East 2005	Zutphen, Netherlands	KO	3	
2005-01-31	Win	(Morocco) Hamid el Caid	Time for action	Nijmegen, Netherlands	TKO		
2004-04-10	Win	(Turkey) Coskun Dağ	Beast of the East	Zutphen, Netherlands	Decision (unanimous)	5	3:00
Retains W.F.C.A. Thai-boxing junior middleweight Dutch title -69.85 kg.
2004-02-22	Win	(England) Kieran Keddle	Thunder & Lightning IX	London, England, UK	Decision	5	3:00
2003-09-28	Win	(England) Kieran Keddle	W.P.K.L. Muay Thai Champions League XI	Rotterdam, Netherlands	Decision	5	3:00
2003-06-08	Loss	(Morocco) Fikri Tijarti	It's Showtime 2003 Amsterdam	Amsterdam, Netherlands	Decision	5	3:00
2003-04-19	Win	(Morocco) Rachied el Haddad	Beast of the East	Zutphen, Netherlands	TKO (knockdown/leaving the ring)	3	
Wins W.F.C.A. Thai-boxing junior middleweight Dutch title -69.85 kg.
2002-10-27	Win	(Cape Verde) Noel Soares	Beast of the East, Sporthal Elderveld	Arnhem, Netherlands	KO (knee strike)	3	
2002-03-04	Win	(Morocco) Adil Boukhari	W.P.K.L. Champions League VI	Rotterdam, Netherlands	Decision	5	3:00
2001-11-03	Win	(Suriname) Marco Piqué	Gala in Brediushal	Amsterdam, Netherlands	Decision	5	2:00
2001-01-30	Loss	(Switzerland) Marino Deflorin	K-1 Holland GP 2001 in Arnhem, Super Fight	Arnhem, Netherlands	Decision (unanimous)	5	3:00
2000-09-03	Win	(Netherlands) Marcel Doomernik	The Battle for Arnhem II	Arnhem, Netherlands	Decision	5	3:00
Wins I.K.B.O. Thai-boxing European title -67 kg.
2000-05-20	Win	(Netherlands) Chris van Venrooij	Showdown 2	Netherlands	Decision	5	3:00
Legend: Win Loss Draw/no contest Notes

== See also ==
- List of male kickboxers
- List of K-1 events

Sporting positions
Preceded by WFCA was established in January 1997.	1st WFCA Thaiboxing European Junior middleweight Champion; November 13, 2005 – Unknown	Succeeded by Lindo Profas
Preceded by WFCA was established in January 1997.	1st WFCA Thaiboxing World Junior middleweight Champion; January 26, 2008 - January 30, 2010	Succeeded by Andy Souwer
