= Grégory Choplin =

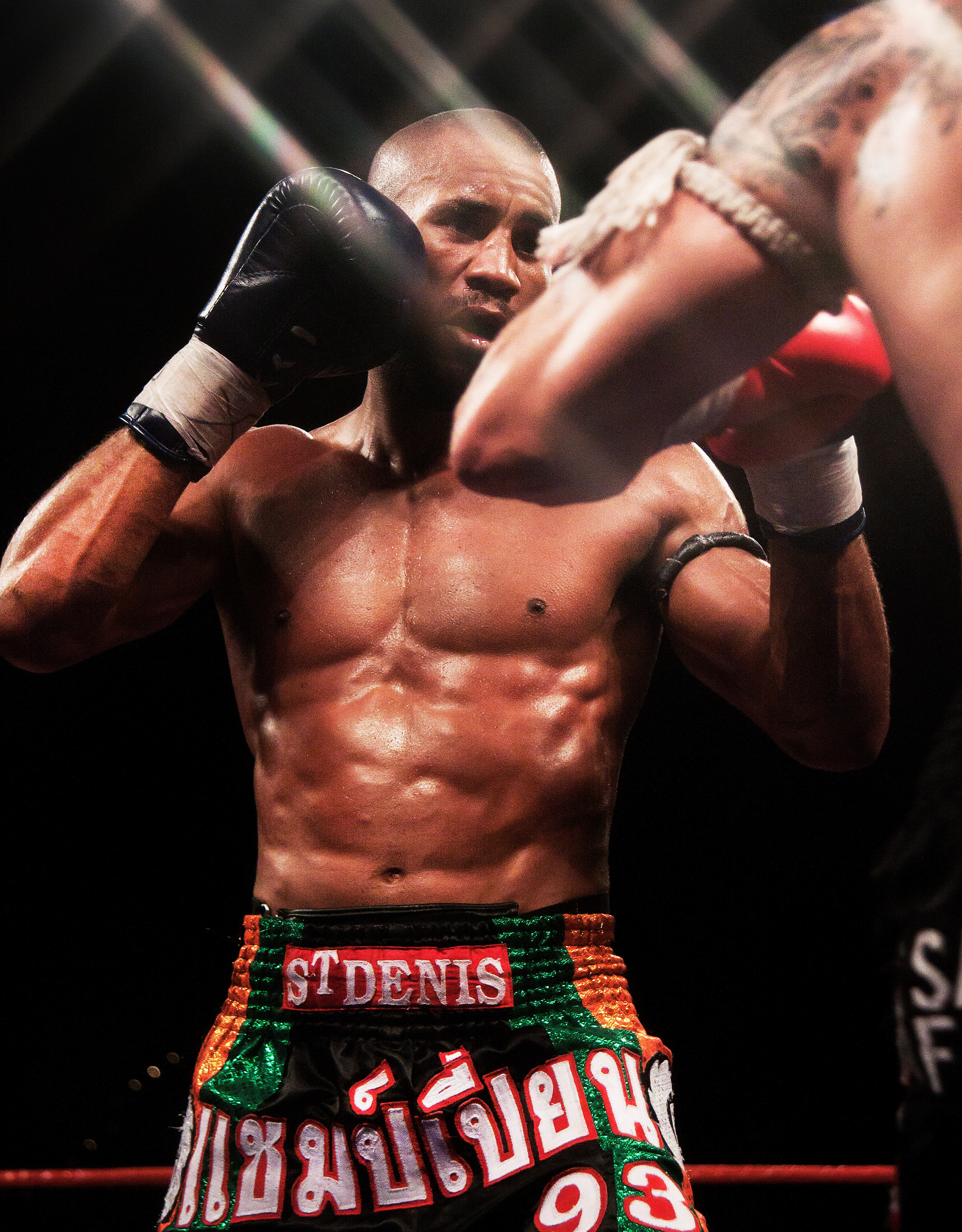
- Grégory Choplin at Battle in the Desert II, 2013
- Born: November 15, 1980 (age 45); Saint-Denis, Paris, France
- Other names: Cheetah
- Nationality: French; Ivorian
- Height: 1.84 m (6 ft 1/2 in)
- Weight: 75.0 kg (165.3 lb; 11.81 st)
- Division: Super Middleweight; Middleweight
- Reach: 74 in (190 cm)
- Style: Muay Thai, kickboxing
- Stance: Orthodox
- Fighting out of: Miami, Florida, United States
- Team: DEREK boxing
- Years active: 2000–present

Kickboxing record
- Total: 67
- Wins: 57
- By knockout: 23
- Losses: 10
- By knockout: 3
- Last updated on: March 27, 2014

Grégory "Cheetah" Choplin (born 15 November 1980 in Saint-Denis) is a French-Ivorian Middleweight and Super Middleweight Muay Thai kickboxer.

Choplin currently fights out of DEREK boxing in la Courneuve. He is from Saint-Denis, Paris, France. He is a two-time Muay Thai world champion who has had several title fights within the It's Showtime organization, and is widely thought of as one of the top kickboxers in France.

== Career ==
After winning titles at youth and amateur level, Choplin would he would turn professional at the age of 20 and won his first professional title, the French Class A championship, a few years later in 2004. The same year he was selected to represent France at the amateur world Muaythai championships in Bangkok, Thailand, reaching the semi-finals and claiming a bronze medal.

Between 2001 and 2006 Choplin would be virtually unbeatable at home, having defeated top domestic talent such as Frank Nadje and Yohan Lidon. In order to seek greater challenges, Gregory started to compete outside France where his growing reputation got him a world title shot against Vincent Vielvoye in 2006. Despite having beating Vielvoye a few months early (albeit with some controversy) Choplin was seen as the underdog in the battle for the W.P.K.L. belt. After four rounds, however, Gregory was the new champion, defeating the home fighter in front of a partisan Dutch crowd via technical knockout.

In 2007, Choplin would sign a professional contract with the It's Showtime organization, becoming the first and (so far) only Frenchman to sign a contract with the Dutch kickboxing giants. Signing with the organization meant Gregory would face the best fighters in Europe on a regular basis. That year he also won a second world title, defeating Jan de Keyzer in Santander to become the W.F.C.A. champion. In 2008 he would participate as a wildcard entry in the bi-annual It's Showtime 75MAX trophy, reaching the final where he lost to Dmitry Shakuta. He was also selected as a contestant for the It's Showtime Reality Show, reaching the semi-final stage only to lose to Brazilian Muay Thai supremo Cosmo Alexandre via a devastating knee KO after an extra round in what was an exciting fight.

Gregory bounced back from his recent setups by picking up a number of useful domestic wins against Cédric Muller and Yohan Lidon as well as winning several fights within the It's Showtime organization throughout 2008 and the start of 2009. These results got Choplin a rematch against previous conqueror Dmitry Shakuta for Dmitry's It's Showtime 77MAX title. Choplin was unable to gain revenge for his earlier loss in his failed bid for the title in Budapest, losing a hard five round contest. Throughout 2010 Gregory focused on the domestic scene picking up a good win against top local fighter Moussa Konate. In 2011 Choplin fought in America for the first time, being on the wrong end of an upset when he lost against Ky Hollenbeck - the winner getting a shot at Choplin's old foe Yohan Lidon for the W.B.C. Muaythai world title.

He faced Joe Valtellini at Lion Fight 7 in Las Vegas on October 13, 2012, and won via decision.

Choplin lost to Yodsanklai Fairtex by way of third-round KO at Lion Fight 8 in Las Vegas, Nevada, USA on January 25, 2013.

He bounced back with a points win over Gil Silva at Le Choc des Légendes 2013 in Paris, France, on March 9, 2013.

He was scheduled to fight Duochonlek at the WBC World Muay Thai Millennium Championship in Saint-Pierre, Réunion on September 7, 2013 but the card fell through.

He defeated Marco Piqué via UD in the main event of Lion Fight 14 in Las Vegas, Nevada, United States on March 28, 2014.

He faced Hichem Menaouine at Golden fight 3 in La Courneuve on June 6, 2015, for the W.M.C (World Muaythai Council) title and won via decision.

Choplin defeated Ramon Kübler by TKO (cut) at 2R on April 14, 2016, at Espace Venise in Sarcelles, Val-d'Oise, France. He retained his WBC Muaythai World title

== Titles ==
=== Professional ===
- World Boxing Council Muay Thai
  - 2013 WBC Muay Thai Super Middleweight (168 lbs) World Champion
    - One successful title defense
- World Muaythai Council
  - 2015 WMC World Super Middleweight (-76.2 kg) Champion
- International Kickboxing Federation
  - 2011 IKF Intercontinental Middleweight Champion
- It's Showtime
  - 2008 It's Showtime 75MAX Trophy runner up

World Full Contact Association

  - 2007 W.F.C.A. Thai-boxing World -76.2 kg Champion
- World Professional Kickboxing League
  - 2006 W.P.K.L. Muaythai world champion -76 kg
- Fédération française de muaythaï et disciplines associées
  - 2004 French Muaythai Class A National -75 kg Champion

=== Amateur ===
- 2004 I.F.M.A. World Muaythai Championships in Bangkok, Thailand (bronze) -75 kg

== Fight record ==
Professional Muay Thai and kickboxing record
58 wins (23 (T)KOs), 10 losses, 0 draws, 0 no contests
Date	Result	Opponent	Event	Location	Method	Round	Time
2016-04-14	Win	(Germany) Ramon Kubler	Soirée Boxe anglaise et Muaythai	Sarcelles, France	TKO (cut)	2	2:55
Defends WBC Muaythai Super Middleweight (-76.2 kg) World title.
2015-06-06	Win	(Spain) Hichem Menaouine	Golden Fight 3	La Courneuve, France	Decision (unanimous)	5	3:00
Wins the vacant WMC World Muaythai Super Middleweight (-76.2 kg) title
2014-03-28	Win	(Suriname) Marco Piqué	Lion Fight 14	Las Vegas, Nevada, USA	Decision (unanimous)	5	3:00
2013-05-05	Win	(Portugal) Luis Reis	Championnat du Monde WBC Thai	Aulnay-sous-Bois, France	Decision (unanimous)	5	3:00
Wins the vacant WBC World Muaythai Super Middleweight (-76.2 kg) title.
2013-03-09	Win	(Portugal) Gil Silva	Le Choc des Légendes 2013	Paris, France	Decision	5	3:00
2013-01-25	Loss	(Thailand) Yodsanklai Fairtex	Lion Fight 8	Las Vegas, Nevada, USA	KO (punches)	3	2:40
2012-10-13	Win	(Canada) Joe Valtellini	Lion Fight 7	Las Vegas, Nevada, USA	Decision	5	3:00
2012-04-21	Win	(Netherlands) Mohamed Abdellahim	La Nuit des Combattants 2	Persan, France	TKO	1	
2012-03-24	Win	(Democratic Republic of the Congo) Chris Ngimbi	Thaiboxing Showtime 3	Hazebrouck, France	Decision (unanimous)	3	3:00
2011-05-14	Win	(United States) Chaz Mulkey	Battle in the Desert 5	Las Vegas, NV, USA	Decision (unanimous)	5	3:00
2011-12-07	Loss	(France) Yohan Lidon	A1 WCC Lyon	Lyon, France	TKO (doctor stoppage)	4	
Fight was for WBC World Muaythai Middleweight title (-72.500 kg).
2011-11-12	Loss	(France) Abdallah Mabel	La 18ème Nuit des Champions	Marseille, France	Decision (split)	5	3:00
Fight was for W.P.M.F. World Muaythai title -72.500 kg.
2011-09-10	Win	(Canada) Dave Zuniga	Canadian Fighting Championship 7	Winnipeg, Canada	TKO (punches)	2	
Wins IKF Intercontinental Middleweight title.
2011-05-14	Loss	(United States) Ky Hollenbeck	Battle in the Desert 2	Primm, NV, USA	Decision (unanimous)	5	3:00
Fight was for W.B.C. Interim world middleweight title -72.6 kg.
2011-01-07	Win	(Belgium) Rachid Boumalek	Fight in Spirit	Epernay, France	KO	3	
2010-06-10	Win	(France) Jonathan Camara	Ultimate Thai 5	Paris, France	Decision (unanimous)	5	3:00
2010-04-24	Win	(France) Moussa Konaté	Fight Zone 4	Villeurbanne, France	Decision (unanimous)	5	3:00
2009-08-29	Loss	(Belarus) Dmitry Shakuta	It's Showtime 2009 Budapest	Budapest, Hungary	Decision	5	3:00
For Shakuta's It's Showtime -77 kg World title.
2009-03-14	Win	(Italy) Franco Lazarro	Oktagon presents: It's Showtime 2009	Milan, Italy	Decision (unanimous)	3	3:00
2008-12-06	Win	(France) Cédric Muller	Le Choc Des Légendes III	Paris, France	TKO (cut)	3	
2008-09-06	Win	(United States) William Etzler	It's Showtime 2008 Alkmaar	Alkmaar, Netherlands	TKO (ref. stop./3 knockdowns)	1	
2008-06-07	Win	(France) Yohan Lidon	La Nuit des Challenges 5	Lyon, France	Decision (unanimous)	5	3:00
2008-03-15	Loss	(Belarus) Dmitry Shakuta	It's Showtime Trophy Final '08, Final	's-Hertogenbosch, Netherlands	Decision	3	3:00
Fight was for It's Showtime 75MAX Trophy -75 kg.
2008-03-15	Win	(Belgium) Mohammed Rahhaoui	It's Showtime Trophy Final '08, Semi-final	's-Hertogenbosch, Netherlands	Decision	3	3:00
2008-03-15	Win	(Cape Verde) Alviar Lima	It's Showtime Trophy Final '08, Quarter-final	's-Hertogenbosch, Netherlands	Decision (unanimous)	3	3:00
2007-12-23	Loss	(Brazil) Cosmo Alexandre	It's Showtime Reality, Tournament Semifinals	Koh Samui, Thailand	Ext.R KO (knee)	4	
2007-12-23	Win	(Thailand) Som Lee Nonthing	It's Showtime Reality, Tournament Quarterfinals	Koh Samui, Thailand			
2007-09-17	Win	(Netherlands) Murthel Groenhart	It's Showtime Reality, Tournament First Round	Koh Samui, Thailand	Decision (unanimous)	3	3:00
2007-06-30	Win	(Belgium) Jan de Keyzer	W.F.C.A. Gala	Santander, Spain	Decision	5	3:00
Wins W.F.C.A. Thai-boxing super middleweight world title -76.2 kg.
2007-03-24	Loss	(Belgium) Mohammed Rahhaoui	Fights at the Border V, Elimination Fight	Lommel, Belgium	Decision	3	3:00
Despite defeat qualifies for It's Showtime Trophy Final '08 as a wildcard.
2006-04-15	Win	(Netherlands) Vincent Vielvoye	East Side 5	Gorinchem, Netherlands	TKO	4	
Wins W.P.K.L. Muaythai super middleweight world title -76 kg.
2006-02-18	Win	(Netherlands) Vincent Vielvoye	It's Showtime 2006 Belgium	Mortsel, Belgium	Decision	5	3:00
2005-10-22	Win	(France) Yohan Lidon	La Nuit des Superfights II	Villebon, France	Decision (unanimous)	5	3:00
2005-05-07	Win	(France) Frank Nadje	La Nuit des Superfights	Villebon, France	Decision (unanimous)	5	3:00
2004-04-24	Win	(France) Adel Louail	Finale Championnat de France	Paris, France	TKO	3	
Wins FFMDA Muay Thai -75 kg A-class National title.
2004-04-14	Win	(France) Khadda Redouani	1/2 Finale Championnats de France	Paris, France	Decision (majority)	4	2:00
2002-11-30	Loss	(Italy) Cico Zerbini	Kickboxing Mondiale 3	Padua, Italy	Decision	5	2:00
Legend: Win Loss Draw/no contest Notes

Amateur Muay Thai Record
Date	Result	Opponent	Event	Location	Method	Round	Time
2006-11-10	Loss	(Ukraine) Dimitry Kirpan	I.F.M.A. Muaythai World Championships '04, Semi-final -75 kg	Bangkok, Thailand	Decision	4	2:00
Wins I.F.M.A. World Muaythai Championships '04 Bronze Medal -75 kg.
2006-11-08	Win	(Russia) Kazimbek	I.F.M.A. Muaythai World Championships '04, Quarter-final -75 kg	Bangkok, Thailand	Decision	4	2:00
Legend: Win Loss Draw/no contest Notes

== See also ==
- List of male kickboxers
- List of It's Showtime events
- List of It's Showtime champions
