= SLAMM!! Events =

MMA promoter based in Netherlands

Slamm Events
- Company type: Private
- Industry: Martial arts promotion
- Founded: March 19, 2006
- Founder: Milton Felter and Maikel Polanen
- Headquarters: Almere, Netherlands
- Key people: Milton Felter, President
- Website: slamm.nl

SLAMM!! Events was a Netherlands based mixed martial arts and Muay Thai promotion based in Almere, Netherlands. They organized their flagship "Nederland vs Thailand" series, a ten-hour marathon of mixed martial arts and kickboxing fights as well as an international events in Spain, Belgium, Italy and Suriname.

== Broadcast ==
The Slamm events were delay broadcast to 52 countries on Eurosport.

== Rules ==
Slamm MMA fights were conducted under different rules from the North American Unified Rules. Among the differences were the allowance of knees and stomps to the head of downed opponent. However elbows to the head and soccer kicks were prohibited. Muay Thai fights were conducted under full muay thai rules with elbows 5 X 3 rounds.

== Events ==
As of SLAMM: Nederland vs. Thailand VII, which occurred May 27, 2012, there have been 17 SLAMM events held.
