= Şahin Yakut =

Turkish mixed martial arts fighter

- Born: Şahin Yakut; May 8, 1979 (age 47); Iğdır, Turkey
- Other names: Kaas, Ciger
- Nationality: Turkish; Dutch
- Height: 1.74 m (5 ft 9 in)
- Weight: 72 kg (159 lb; 11.3 st)
- Division: Middleweight
- Style: Kickboxing, Muay Thai
- Fighting out of: Alkmaar, Netherlands
- Team: It's Showtime
- Trainer: Edwin van Os

Kickboxing record
- Total: 96
- Wins: 77
- By knockout: 49
- Losses: 15
- Draws: 4

Mixed martial arts record
- Total: 5
- Wins: 3
- By knockout: 1
- By submission: 1
- By decision: 1
- Losses: 2
- By decision: 1
- Unknown: 1

Other information
- Occupation: Martial arts instructor
- Mixed martial arts record from Sherdog

Şahin Yakut (born 8 May 1979 in Iğdır, Turkey) is a Turkish-Dutch kickboxer and mixed martial artist, currently living in Heerhugowaard, Netherlands and training in Gym Alkmaar. He is a member of the It's Showtime Team and is a training partner of Gago Drago and Joerie Mes. He is known for his in-fighter style which puts massive pressure on his opponents, his flashing kicks and above all, his endurance and ambition.

He has been involved with several organizations such as SuperLeague, It's Showtime and has taken part in special events like Challenge Private Party. He has a 5 and 1 record in his SuperLeague career and is 17 and 3 with It's Showtime as of 29/05/2010. Yakut has fought some of the best fighters in the world and has achieved victories against world champions such as Perry Ubeda, Jomhod Kiatadisak, Ondřej Hutník and Rayen Simson. His brother Metin "Pislik" Yakut is an MMA fighter.

== Şahin on TV ==
Fights on Eurosport: Numerous fights of Yakut are broadcast by Eurosport featuring the highly in-demand fighter. He has been involved on several occasions with the It's Showtime 75MAX Trophy, which he became champion of in 2006. His decision victories against Jiri Zak in the quarters finals, Alviar Lima in the semis and Ondřej Hutník in the final were all aired by the channel.

His recent fights on TV:

- K-1 Italy Oktagon 2008 - super fight against Frenchman Walid Haddad in Milan, Italy on 12 April 2008 which Şahin won on points.
- It's Showtime 75MAX Trophy Final 2008 - quarter-final fight against Belgian Mohammad Rahhoui in Den Bosch, the Netherlands on 15 March 2008 which Şahin lost on points.
- Challenge Private Party - super fight against Portuguese fighter Ricardo Fernandes in Algarve, Portugal on 8 December 2007 where Şahin dispatched his opponent by TKO in the very first round after Fernandes was unable to continue due to low kicks he had suffered.
- Klash Event - super fight against Portuguese fighter Jose Barradas in Transylvania, Romania on 11 November 2007 where Şahin dispatched his opponent by unanimous decision after 3 rounds.
- It's Showtime 2007 Portugal - super fight against French fighter Jean-Philippe Garcia at Casino Vilamoura, Algarve, Portugal in September 2007, where Şahin dispatched his opponent by TKO in just one and half minutes into the very first round.

=== It's Showtime Reality ===
- Şahin has also been involved in a martial arts TV contest called It's Showtime Reality from January 2008 on which there is a total of 12 episodes. He was a trainer for 22 fighters chosen worldwide who compete for being the winner of the show, with a final match and K-1 debut at the K-1 World Grand Prix 2008 in Amsterdam on 26 April 2008 and the possibility of earning a $100,000 contract with the It's Showtime organization.

== Miscellaneous ==
- Şahin can speak Turkish and Dutch at native level. He can speak English as well.
- Şahin is pronounced as “Sha-hin” and it means falcon, while Yakut means ruby in Turkish.

== Titles ==
Kickboxing/Muay Thai

- 2006 It's Showtime 75MAX Trophy (-75 kg) Champion in Rotterdam
- 2005 It's Showtime Prague Pool B Champion
- 2003 W.P.K.L. Muaythai Champions League Rome Pool B Champion
- W.I.P.U. King of the Ring Champion

Mixed Martial Arts

- 2008 W.I.P.U. "King of the Ring" MMA super champion -77 kg

== Kickboxing record ==
Kickboxing Record
77 Wins (49 (T)KO's), 15 Losses, 4 Draws
Date	Result	Opponent	Event	Location	Method	Round	Time
2010-05-29	Win	(Suriname) Rayen Simson	It's Showtime 2010 Amsterdam	Amsterdam, Netherlands	Decision (5-0)	3	3:00
2010-01-?	Loss	(England) Rick Barnhill	Enfusion Kickboxing Tournament, 2nd Round	Koh Samui, Thailand	Decision	3	3:00
Fails to qualify for Enfusion Kickboxing Tournament, Semi Finals.
2010-01-?	Win	(France) Mikael Lallemand	Enfusion Kickboxing Tournament, 1st Round	Koh Samui, Thailand	Ext.R Decision	4	3:00
2009-10-24	Win	(Belgium) Morad Salhi	It's Showtime 2009 Lommel	Lommel, Belgium	Decision	3	3:00
2009-05-16	Win	(Netherlands) Perry Ubeda	It's Showtime 2009 Amsterdam	Amsterdam, Netherlands	Decision (Unanimous)	3	3:00
2009-03-14	Win	(Albania) Shemsi Beqiri	Oktagon presents: It's Showtime 2009	Milan, Italy	KO (Right Hook)	1	0:45
2009-02-08	Win	(Belgium) Mohammed Rahhaoui	Fights at the Border presents: It's Showtime 2009	Antwerp, Belgium	Decision (Unanimous)	3	3:00
2008-11-29	Loss	(Suriname) Imro Main	It's Showtime 2008 Eindhoven	Eindhoven, Netherlands	Decision	3	3:00
2008-09-06	Win	(Poland) Lucas Rambalski	It's Showtime 2008 Alkmaar	Alkmaar, Netherlands	TKO (Ref Stop/Broken Nose)	1	
2008-04-12	Win	(France) Wallid Haddad	K-1 Italy Oktagon 2008, Super Fight	Milan, Italy	Decision (Unanimous)	3	3:00
2008-03-15	Loss	(Belgium) Mohammed Rahhaoui	It's Showtime 75MAX Trophy Final 2008, Quarter Finals	's-Hertogenbosch, Netherlands	Decision	3	3:00
2007-10-26	Win	(Portugal) Jose Barradas	Klash III: Show No Mercy	Sibiu, Romania	Decision (Unanimous)	3	3:00
2007-10-14	Win	(Curaçao) Cedric Copra	Kickboks Gala Istanbul	Istanbul, Turkey	TKO		
2007-09-23	Win	(France) Jean-Philippe Garcia	It's Showtime 75MAX Trophy Portugal, Super Fight	Vilamoura, Portugal	TKO (Corner Stoppage)	1	
2007-01-13	Win	(France) Wallid Haddad	K-1 Turkey Grand Prix 2007, Super Fight	Istanbul, Turkey	Decision (Unanimous)	3	3:00
2006-09-23	Win	(Czech Republic) Ondřej Hutník	It's Showtime 75MAX Trophy Final 2006, Final	Rotterdam, Netherlands	Decision	3	3:00
Wins It's Showtime 75MAX Trophy 2006 -75 kg.
2006-09-23	Win	(Cape Verde) Alviar Lima	It's Showtime 75MAX Trophy Final 2006, Semi Finals	Rotterdam, Netherlands	Decision (Unanimous)	3	3:00
2006-09-23	Win	(Czech Republic) Jiri Zak	It's Showtime 75MAX Trophy Final 2006, Quarter Finals	Rotterdam, Netherlands	Decision (Unanimous)	3	3:00
2006-06-03	Win	(Suriname) Marco Piqué	Gentleman Fight Night III	Tilburg, Netherlands	KO	4	
2006-05-13	Loss	(Portugal) José Reis	SuperLeague Elimination 2006, Quarter Finals	Vienna, Austria	Decision	3	3:00
2006-03-11	Win	(Austria) Fadi Merza	SuperLeague Apocalypse 2006	Paris, France	Decision	3	3:00
2006-01-28	Win	(Croatia) Mario Princ	SuperLeague Hungary 2006	Budapest, Hungary	TKO	3	
2005-12-18	Win	(Thailand) Jomhod Kiatadisak	It's Showtime 75MAX Trophy Prague, Pool B Final	Prague, Czech Republic	Ext.R Decision	4	3:00
Wins It's Showtime 75MAX Trophy Prague Pool B Final and qualifies for It's Showtime 75MAX Trophy Final 2006.
2005-12-18	Win	(Czech Republic) Marek Lončak	It's Showtime 75MAX Trophy Prague, Pool B Semi Finals	Prague, Czech Republic	KO	2	
2005-11-19	Win	(Iran) Seyed Ahmed Moinshirazi	SuperLeague Portugal 2005	Carcavelos, Portugal	TKO (Leg Injury)	2	
2005-06-12	Win	(Turkey) Ali Gunyar	It's Showtime 2005 Amsterdam	Amsterdam, Netherlands	TKO (Corner Stop/Low Kicks)	4	
2005-04-09	Win	(Austria) Fadi Merza	SuperLeague Austria 2005	Vienna, Austria	Decision	5	3:00
2004-11-14	Win	(Turkey) Yucel Fidan	Muay Thai/Mixed Fight Gala, Sporthal Stedenwijk	Almere, Netherlands	Decision	5	3:00
2004-12-18	Win	(Croatia) Mario Princ	SuperLeague Netherlands 2004	Uden, Netherlands	TKO (Ref Stop/Knee)	4	
2004-01-25	Win	(Slovakia) Michal Palovic	Thaiboxing & Freefight event in Alkmaar	Alkmaar, Netherlands	TKO	2	
2003-09-28	Win	(Netherlands) William Diender	W.P.K.L. Muay Thai Champions League XI	Rotterdam, Netherlands	Decision	5	3:00
2003-04-20	Win	(Suriname) Junior Consalves	Tulp Muay Thai Gala	Amsterdam, Netherlands	KO	2	
2003-03-29	Win	(Suriname) Marco Piqué	Muaythai Champions League Rome, Pool B Final	Rome, Italy	TKO (Corner Stoppage)	2	
Wins W.P.K.L. Muaythai Champions League Rome Pool B Final -72.5 kg.
2003-03-29	Win	(France) Fabrice Allouche	Muaythai Champions League Rome, Pool B Semi Finals	Rome, Italy	Decision	3	3:00
2003-03-16	Win	(Cape Verde) Alviar Lima	Ahoy Simply The Best VI	Rotterdam, Netherlands	Decision (Unanimous)	5	3:00
2003-01-26	Win	(Estonia) Tarvo Rahuoja	Gala in Schremerhorn	Schermerhorn, Netherlands	KO	2	
2002-09-29	Win	(Netherlands) Ron Post	It's Showtime – As Usual / Battle Time	Haarlem, Netherlands	Decision	5	3:00
2002-06-08	Win	(Morocco) Nabil Boukhari	W.P.K.L. Muay Thai Champions League VII	Rotterdam, Netherlands	TKO	1	
2002-04-27	Win	(Netherlands) Joerie Mes	Gala in Schremerhorn	Schermerhorn, Netherlands	Decision	3	3:00
2002-02-24	Loss	(Netherlands) Perry Ubeda	K-1 World Grand Prix 2002 Netherlands	Arnhem, Netherlands	Decision (Unanimous)	12	2:00
Fight was for vacant W.K.A. Full Contact Middleweight World title -76.2 kg.
2001-10-21	Win	(Turkey) Ali Gunyar	It's Showtime - Original	Haarlem, Netherlands	TKO	3	
2000-10-22	Loss	(Netherlands) Joerie Mes	It's Showtime - Exclusive	Haarlem, Netherlands	Decision	5	3:00
1999-10-24	Win	(Netherlands) Rogier van der Heijden	It's Showtime - It's Showtime	Haarlem, Netherlands	Decision	5	3:00
Legend: Win Loss Draw/No contest Notes

== Mixed martial arts record ==
Professional record breakdown
5 matches	3 wins	2 losses
By knockout	1	0
By submission	1	0
By decision	1	1
Unknown	0	1

Res.	Record	Opponent	Method	Event	Date	Round	Time	Location	Notes
Win	3-2	Chico Martinez	Submission (rear naked choke)	KOE - Tough Is Not Enough	October 5, 2008	1	N/A	Rotterdam, Netherlands	Wins W.I.P.U. "King of the Ring" MMA super title -77 kg.
Loss	2-2	Vincent Latoel	Decision (unanimous)	K-1 World Grand Prix 2007 in Amsterdam	June 23, 2007	2	5:00	Amsterdam, Netherlands	
Win	2-1	Chico Martinez	Decision	2 Hot 2 Handle	October 10, 2004	2	5:00	Rotterdam, Netherlands	
Win	1-1	Gilbert Ballantine	TKO (doctor stoppage)	Rings Holland: One Moment In Time	December 1, 2002	1	0:51	Utrecht, Netherlands	
Loss	0-1	Roman Vanicky	Unknown	Night of the Gladiators 12	February 25, 2001	N/A	N/A	Prague, Czech Republic	

== See also ==
- List of K-1 events
- List of It's Showtime events
- List of It's Showtime champions
- List of male kickboxers
- List of male mixed martial artists
