= Pajonsuk SuperPro Samui =

Thai former professional Muay Thai fighter and amateur boxer

Pajonsuk
- Born: Angkhan Chomphuphuang; January 20, 1980 (age 46); Lopburi, Thailand
- Other names: Pajonsuk S.K.V. Pajonsuk Lukprabat (ผจญศึก ลูกพระบาท)
- Height: 1.76 m (5 ft 9 1/2 in)
- Division: Welterweight; Super Welterweight; Middleweight
- Style: Muay Thai, Boxing, Wushu
- Stance: Orthodox
- Team: Superpro Samui (Muay Thai); Royal Thai Air Force (Boxing)

Kickboxing record
- Total: 171
- Wins: 127
- Losses: 33
- Draws: 11

Pajonsuk SuperPro Samui
Medal record

Representing Thailand

Men's Boxing

Asian Games
Silver medal – second place	2006 Doha	Welterweight

Representing Thailand

Men's Wushu

SEA Games
Gold medal – first place	2001 Kuala Lumpur	65 kg

Asian Games
Gold medal – first place	2002 Busan	65 kg

Angkhan Chomphuphuang (Thai: อังคาร ชมพูพวง; born January 20, 1980), known professionally as Pajonsuk (Thai: ผจญศึก), is a Thai former professional Muay Thai fighter and amateur boxer. He is a former Lumpinee Stadium Welterweight Champion who also competed in Wushu and as an amateur boxer including in the 2008 Olympics.

== Biography and career ==
Born in Lopburi, Pajonsuk began his Muay Thai education at the Lukprabart camp in Saraburi province aged six years old. As a youngster he won Thai national championships at 28, 32 and 35 kg and became a hot prospect on the local scene. Not one to be confined to just one sport, Pajonsuk also branched out into the Chinese art of Wushu, winning a gold medal in the -76 kg division at the Southeast Asian Games in Kuala Lumpur, Malaysia in 2001. He would also travel to fight, winning his first ever world title (I.K.K.C) in the United States against the reigning champion and fellow countryman Matee Jedeepitak by TKO in mid-2002. Fresh from his victory in America, Pajonsuk returned to Thailand where he faced Kaolan Kaovichit, a man who had defeated him in their two previous meetings, including in a world title fight. This time Pajonsuk gained revenge by defeating Kaolan and becoming the new Lumpinee champion. Earlier that year he returned to action at the 2002 Asian Games in Busan, South Korea to pick up his second gold medal in the art of Wushu.

At the end of 2003, Pajonsuk once more faced old foe Kaolan Kaovichit for the fourth and final time, losing his Lumpinee Stadium title by decision. After this defeat he travelled to Europe for a new challenge, facing Stjepan Veselic for Veslic's W.P.K.L. world title belt. Veselic had defending his title three times including an upset KO victory over Thai legend Sakmongkol Sithchuchok, but on the night in Rotterdam there was a new champion, Pajonsuk handing Vesilic a third round stoppage defeat. As he was running out of competition in Thailand where traditionally the most competitive divisions were at lower weight, Pajonsuk would fight more and more in Europe, picking up wins against the likes of Joerie Mes and Alviar Lima and losing a close decision to Rayen Simson fighting on cards for reputable Dutch organizations such as It's Showtime and Gentlemen promotions.

In 2010, he entered the Enfusion Reality Show which involved some of the top Muay Thai fighters from across the world at 70 kg, with the first part of the show based at a training camp in Koh Samui, Thailand. Pajonsuk won two elimination fights in Thailand against Jan van Denderen and Shane Campbell respectively making the final 4 stage in Lisbon where he lost in the battle for the $40,000 first prize to Gago Drago via decision. By the end of 2010 Pajonsuk would make only his second appearance on a K-1 show. There had been rumors throughout the year that he would replace regular Thai K-1 MAX representative Buakaw Por. Pramuk who would not participate in the final 16 stage due to a contract dispute with the organization but in the end the relatively unknown Sagetpetch would take his place and Pajonsuk would have to make do with a super fight appearance, beating Woo Yong Choi at the event in Seoul, South Korea.

Returning from a long lay off of over two years, Pajonsuk fought Michael Wakeling at Enfusion Live 3 in London, England on March 30, 2013. He lost by unanimous decision after an extra round.

He lost to Tayfun Ozcan via decision at Enfusion Live 5 in Eindhoven, Netherlands on May 11, 2013.

== Amateur boxing career ==
Pajonsuk competed under his birthname of Angkhan Chomphuphuang in the welterweight (– 69 kg) division at the 2006 Asian Games settling for the silver medal in a lost bout against Kazakhstan's Bakhyt Sarsekbayev (8-28). He qualified for the 2008 Summer Olympics at middleweight among others knocking out Elshod Rasulov. He beat Cho Deok-Jin but was upset by Vijender Singh.

== Titles ==
Muay Thai

- 2002-03 Lumpinee Stadium Muaythai welterweight champion -66.8 kg
- 2002 I.K.K.C. Pro Muaythai junior welterweight world champion -63.5 kg
- W.M.C. Muaythai super middleweight world champion
- 2004 W.P.K.L. Muaythai middleweight world champion -72.5 kg

Kickboxing

- 2010 Enfusion Reality Show tournament runner up -70 kg

Sanda/Wushu

- 2001 Southeast Asian Games in Kuala Lumpur, Malaysia (gold) -76 kg (Wushu)
- 2002 Asian Games in Busan, South Korea (gold) -65 kg (Wushu)

Awards

- 2002 Sports Writers Association of Thailand Fight of the Year (vs Namsaknoi Yudthagarngamtorn)

Boxing

- 2006 Asian Games in Doha, Qatar (silver) -69 kg
- 2006 28th King's Cup Boxing Tournament in Bangkok, Thailand (gold)

== Fight record ==
Kickboxing Record
127 Wins, 33 Losses, 11 Draws
Date	Result	Opponent	Event	Location	Method	Round	Time
2013-05-11	Loss	(Turkey) Tayfun Ozcan	Enfusion Live 5	Eindhoven, Netherlands	Decision	3	3:00
2013-03-30	Loss	(England) Michael Wakeling	Enfusion Live 3	London, England	Ext.R Decision (unanimous)	4	3:00
2010-12-11	Loss	(Netherlands) Andy Souwer	It's Showtime Athens 2010	Athens, Greece	Decision (5-0)	3	3:00
2010-10-03	Win	(South Korea) Woo Yong Choi	K-1 World MAX Final 16 - Part 2, Super Fight	Seoul, South Korea	Decision (Unanimous)	3	3:00
2010-07-10	Loss	(Armenia) Gago Drago	Enfusion Kickboxing tournament '10, Final	Lisbon, Portugal	Decision	3	3:00
Fight was for Enfusion Kickboxing Final 4 2010 tournament title -70 kg.
2010-07-10	Win	(Italy) Armen Petrosyan	Enfusion Kickboxing tournament '10, Semi Final	Lisbon, Portugal	Ext.R Decision	4	3:00
2010-05-29	Win	(Japan) Yoshihiro Sato	It's Showtime 2010 Amsterdam	Amsterdam, Netherlands	Decision (Unanimous)	3	3:00
2010-02-13	Win	(South Korea) Chan Sung Jung	It's Showtime 2010 Prague	Prague, Czech Republic	Disq. (Illegal Move)	1	2:05
2010-01-?	Win	(Canada) Shane Campbell	Enfusion Kickboxing tournament '10, 2nd Round	Koh Samui, Thailand			
Qualifies for Enfusion Kickboxing Final 4.
2010-01-?	Win	(Belgium) Jan van Denderen	Enfusion Kickboxing tournament '10, 1st Round	Koh Samui, Thailand			
2009-12-12	Win	(Germany) Cagri Ermis	Backstreet Fights II	Cologne, Germany	TKO (Corner Stop/Low Kick)	1	
2009-09-15	Win	(Thailand) Doungpikart Kor. Sapaotong	Petchpiya Fight, Lumpinee Stadium	Bangkok, Thailand	Decision	5	3:00
2008-02-26	Loss	(Thailand) Nongbank Thor Meanburi	Por Pramuk Fights, Lumpinee Stadium	Bangkok, Thailand	Decision	5	3:00
2007-06-23	Win	(Morocco) Tarik El Idrissi	K-1 World GP 2007 Amsterdam, Super Fight	Amsterdam, Netherlands	TKO (Injury/Shin)	1	
2007-06-02	Loss	(Morocco) Youness El Mhassani	Gentleman Fight Night 4	Tilburg, Netherlands	Decision (Unanimous)	5	3:00
2007-04-29	Win	(Egypt) Amir Zeyada	Beatdown Gala	Amsterdam, Netherlands	Decision	5	3:00
2006-06-03	Win	(Cape Verde) Alviar Lima	Gentleman Fight Night 3	Tilburg, Netherlands	Decision (Unanimous)	5	3:00
2006-03-19	Loss	(Morocco) Youness El Mhassani	SLAMM "Nederland vs Thailand"	Almere, Netherlands	Disq. (Thow)		
2005-06-12	Win	(Morocco) Tarek Slimani	It's Showtime 2005 Amsterdam	Amsterdam, Netherlands	Decision	5	3:00
2005-04-09	Win	(Netherlands) Vincent Vielvoye	Muay Thai Champions League XIV	Amsterdam, Netherlands	Decision	3	3:00
2004-11-14	Loss	(Suriname) Rayen Simson	Muay Thai/Mixed Fight Gala, Sporthal Stedenwijk	Almere, Netherlands	Decision	5	3:00
2004-05-20	Win	(Netherlands) Joerie Mes	It's Showtime 2004 Amsterdam	Amsterdam, Netherlands	Decision	5	3:00
2004-03-21	Win	(Croatia) Stjepan Veselic	"Veselic vs. Lumpini's No. 1"	Rotterdam, Netherlands	KO (Elbows)	3	
Wins Veselic's W.P.K.L. Muaythai middleweight world title -72.5 kg.
2003-08-08	Win	(China) Lin Jianshen	The 4th China kung fu VS vocational muay Thai	Bangkok, Thailand	Decision	5	3:00
2003-05-28	Win	(Thailand) Chaowalit Jockygym	Lumpinee Stadium	Bangkok, Thailand	Decision	5	3:00
2003-03-08	Loss	(Thailand) Kaolan Kaovichit	Lumpinee Stadium	Bangkok, Thailand	Decision (Unanimous)	5	3:00
Loses Lumpinee Stadium welterweight title -66.8 kg.
2002-07-20	Win	(Thailand) Kaolan Kaovichit	Lumpinee Stadium	Bangkok, Thailand	Decision (Unanimous)	5	3:00
Wins vacant Lumpinee Stadium welterweight title -66.8 kg.
2002-06-01	Win	(Thailand) Mathee Jadeepitak	Bad to the Bone	Santa Ana Pueblo, NM, USA	TKO (Shoulder injury)	4	
Wins Jedeepitak's I.K.K.C. Muaythai junior welterweight world title -63.5 kg.
2002-02-01	Loss	(Thailand) Namsaknoi Yudthagarngamtorn		Pattaya, Thailand	Decision	5	3:00
2001-06-24	Loss	(Thailand) Kaolan Kaovichit	Muay Thai - The World Heritage	Bangkok, Thailand	Decision (Unanimous)	5	3:00
Fight was for vacant W.M.T.C. welterweight world title -66.8 kg.
2000-11-11	Win	(Belarus) Dmitry Shakuta	Thailand vs Belarus	Bangkok, Thailand	Decision	5	3:00
Legend: Win Loss Draw/No contest Notes

Amateur Wushu Record
Date	Result	Opponent	Event	Location	Method	Round	Time
2002-10-13	Win	(Iran) Mohammad Aghaei	Asian Games '02, Wushu Final -65 kg	Busan, South Korea	Decision (2-0)	3	2:00
Wins Asian Games '02 Wushu Gold Medal -65 kg.
2002-10-12	Win	(Philippines) Eduard Folayang	Asian Games '02, Wushu Semi Final -65 kg	Busan, South Korea	KO		
2002-10-11	Win	(Nepal) Shyam Bista	Asian Games '02, Wushu Quarter Final -65 kg	Busan, South Korea	Decision (2-0)	3	2:00
2002-10-10	Win	(South Korea) Choi Young-Min	Asian Games '02, Wushu 1st Round -65 kg	Busan, South Korea	Decision (2-0)	3	2:00
Legend: Win Loss Draw/No contest Notes

== See also ==
- List of It's Showtime events
- List of K-1 events
- List of male kickboxers
