= Shane Campbell =

Canadian martial artist

- Born: Shane Darryl Campbell; January 21, 1987 (age 39)
- Other names: Shaolin
- Nationality: Canadian
- Height: 6 ft 0 in (1.83 m)
- Weight: 155 lb (70 kg; 11.1 st)
- Division: Lightweight (2010–present); Super Lightweight (165 lb) (2021–present); Welterweight (2012, 2015)
- Reach: 71 in (180 cm)
- Style: Muay Thai
- Fighting out of: Kelowna, British Columbia, Canada
- Team: Iron Tiger Muay Thai; Shaved Bears MMA; Toshido MMA (2014–present)
- Trainer: Kru Alin Hălmăgean
- Rank: Brown in Brazilian Jiu-Jitsu under Bibiano Fernandez
- Years active: 2003–present

Professional boxing record
- Total: 2
- Wins: 1
- Losses: 1

Kickboxing record
- Total: 71
- Wins: 62
- By knockout: 14
- Losses: 9

Mixed martial arts record
- Total: 32
- Wins: 24
- By knockout: 9
- By submission: 6
- By decision: 9
- Losses: 8
- By knockout: 2
- By submission: 2
- By decision: 4

Other information
- Website: http://irontigermuaythai.com/
- Boxing record from BoxRec
- Mixed martial arts record from Sherdog

Shane Darryl Campbell (born January 21, 1987) is a Canadian welterweight Muay Thai kickboxer and mixed martial artist who currently competes for Unified MMA, where he is both the Lightweight and Super Lightweight champion. A former W.K.A. Muay Thai World Champion, Campbell is also the current WMA World Pro Muay Thai Champion, Aggression MMA World Champion, and Unified MMA World Champion. Campbell is by far one of the most decorated Muay Thai fighters in North America and is also current W.M.A. Muay Thai Middleweight World Champion.

== Biography/career ==
Born on January 21, 1987, Shane grew up in Hamilton, Ontario and started kickboxing at the age of 16. He had his first pro fight at 18, joining the Iron Tiger Muay Thai Gym under Romanian-Canadian Muay Thai Guru Kru Alin Hălmăgean in Stoney Creek, Ontario, but would continue to fight on both the professional and amateur circuits up until 2007. Since 2008 Shane has increasingly become involved in mixed martial arts and has recently signed up with Aggression MMA having had some early success in the sport.

Campbell stopped Justin Greskiewicz in round one at the K-1 World Qualifying Tour 2013 in Calgary on June 8, 2013.

He stopped Wallace Lopes with a first round body kick at the K-1 World MAX 2013 World Championship Tournament Final 16 in Mallorca, Spain on September 24, 2013.

He was scheduled to fight Maximo Suarez at the K-1 World MAX 2013 World Championship Tournament Quarter Finals - Part 2 in Gran Canria, Spain on January 11, 2014. However, he was then moved to the K-1 World MAX 2013 World Championship Tournament Quarter Finals - Part 1 in Foshan, China on December 28, 2013, and his opponent changed to Christopher Mena after the fight between Andy Souwer and Enriko Kehl from that card was cancelled (Souwer was unable to compete due to a bout of appendicitis while Kehl was moved to the January 11 event against Maximo Suarez due to suffering numerous cuts in fight with Buakaw Banchamek earlier in December). Campbell scored two knockdowns, one with a knee to the body in round two and one with a right hand at the end of round three, and won on points.

At the K-1 World MAX 2013 World Championship Tournament Final 4 in Baku, Azerbaijan on February 23, 2014, he lost to Enriko Kehl by UD in the semi-finals.

In March 2014, Campbell announced his intention to move up in weight to the -75 kg/165 lb division.

== Championships and accomplishments ==
=== Martial arts ===
- Aggression Fighting Championship
  - AFC Lightweight Championship (one time; former)
- Unified MMA
  - Unified MMA Welterweight Championship (one time; former)
  - Unified MMA Catchweight Championship (one time; current)
    - One successful title defense
  - Unified MMA Lightweight Championship (one time; former)
    - Two successful title defenses
- Fight Night - Z Promotions
  - Fight Night Lightweight Champion (one time; current)

=== Muay Thai ===
- 2013 WMC North American Muay Thai Champion
- 2009 W.M.A. World Muay Thai champion
- 2007 W.K.A. World Muay Thai Champion
- 2007 W.M.F. World Championships (silver) -71 kg
- 2006 W.M.F. North American Muay Thai champion
- 2006 W.K.A. North American Muay Thai Champion
- 2005 I.U.K.A. Mid West American Muay Thai Champion
- C.A.M.T.A.O. Canadian Muay Thai Champion
- C.A.M.T.A.O. Ontario Muay Thai Champion

== Mixed martial arts career ==
=== Early career ===
In addition to his kickboxing career, Campbell began competing professionally in mixed martial arts in 2008. He competed primarily in regional organizations in his native Canada, including Aggression Fighting Championship and Maximum Fighting Championship before signing with the UFC in 2015.

=== Ultimate Fighting Championship ===
Campbell made his promotional debut as an injury replacement against John Makdessi on April 25, 2015, at UFC 186. The bout was contested at a catchweight of 160 lbs. Campbell lost the fight via TKO in the first round.

Campbell faced Elias Silvério at UFC Fight Night 74 on August 23, 2015. He won the fight by unanimous decision.

Campbell faced James Krause on February 21, 2016, at UFC Fight Night 83. He lost the fight by unanimous decision.

Campbell next faced Erik Koch on May 29, 2016, at UFC Fight Night 88, filling in for an injured Joe Proctor. He lost the fight via submission in the second round.

Campbell next faced promotional newcomer Felipe Silva on August 27, 2016, at UFC on Fox 21. He lost the fight via TKO in the first round and was subsequently released from the promotion.

=== Post-UFC career ===
After his release, Campbell compiled an 8–2 record, fighting mostly in Unified MMA, where he has won and defended both Unified MMA Lightweight and Catchweight (165 lbs) Championships.

Campbell defended the Unified MMA Lightweight title against Hubert Geven on December 17, 2021, at Unified MMA 42. He won the bout via TKO in the second round.

Campbell faced Kyle Prepolec on March 4, 2022, at Unified MMA 43. He won the bout via unanimous decision.

Campbell defended his Unified MMA Super Lightweight title against Darren Smith Jr. on December 16, 2022, at Unified MMA 48, winning the bout via fourth round rear-naked choke.

He defended the Unified MMA Super Lightweight title against former UFC fighter Darrell Horcher on December 15, 2023, winning the bout via TKO (head kick to flying knee).

== Boxing career ==
Campbell made his boxing debut on December 9, 2011, against Paul Bzdel. He lost the bout via split decision.

Almost a dozen years removed from his debut, Campbell made his sophomore appearance against Matt Krayco on May 26, 2023. He won the bout via unanimous decision.

== Mixed martial arts record ==
Professional record breakdown
32 matches	24 wins	8 losses
By knockout	9	2
By submission	6	2
By decision	9	4

Res.	Record	Opponent	Method	Event	Date	Round	Time	Location	Notes
Win	24-8	Darrell Horcher	KO (head kick and knee)	Unified MMA 54	December 15, 2023	2	2:19	Enoch, Canada	Defended the Unified MMA Super Lightweight Championship.
Win	23-8	Darren Smith Jr.	Submission (rear-naked choke)	Unified MMA 48	December 16, 2022	4	2:15	Toronto, Canada	Defended the Unified MMA Super Lightweight Championship.
Win	22–8	Kyle Prepolec	Decision (unanimous)	Unified MMA 43	March 4, 2022	3	5:00	Enoch, Canada	Won the Unified MMA Super Lightweight (165 lb) Championship.
Win	21–8	Hubert Geven	TKO (punches)	Unified MMA 42	December 17, 2021	2	2:33	Enoch, Canada	Won the Unified MMA Lightweight Championship.
Win	20–8	Matt Krayco	Decision (unanimous)	Unified MMA 41	September 24, 2021	5	5:00	Edmonton, Canada	Defended the Unified MMA 165 lbs Championship.
Win	19–8	Dawond Pickney	TKO (body kick and punches)	Unified MMA 39: Campbell vs Pickney	December 9, 2019	2	4:59	Enoch, Canada	Won the Unified MMA Catchweight Championship.
Win	18–8	David Jordan	Decision (unanimous)	Z Promotions - Fight Night 11	September 28, 2019	3	5:00	Lethbridge, Canada	
Loss	17–8	Pavel Gordeev	Decision (unanimous)	Russian Cagefighting Championship 6	May 4, 2019	3	5:00	Chelyabinsk, Russia	
Win	17–7	Menad Abella	Decision (unanimous)	Unified MMA 36	March 1, 2019	3	5:00	Enoch, Canada	
Loss	16–7	Magomedsaygid Alibekov	Decision (unanimous)	Russian Cagefighting Championship 5	Dec 15, 2018	3	5:00	Yekaterinburg, Russia	
Win	16–6	Stephen Beaumant	Submission (neck crank)	Unified MMA 33: Resurrection	May 11, 2018	3	3:31	Enoch, Canada	Defefended Unified MMA lightweight title.
Win	15–6	Mike Scarcello	Submission (rear-naked choke)	Unified MMA 32: Campbell vs Scarcello	September 29, 2017	2	4:01	Edmonton, Canada	Defefended Unified MMA lightweight title.
Win	14–6	Tristan Connelly	Submission (kneebar)	Unified MMA 31: Connelly vs. Campbell	June 9, 2017	3	4:54	Edmonton, Canada	Won Unified MMA lightweight title.
Win	13–6	Jose Rodriguez	TKO (body kick and punches)	Unified MMA 30: Nybakken vs. Connelly	March 31, 2017	3	1:46	Edmonton, Canada	
Loss	12–6	Felipe Silva	TKO (body punch)	UFC on Fox: Maia vs. Condit	August 27, 2016	1	1:13	Vancouver, Canada	
Loss	12–5	Erik Koch	Submission (rear-naked choke)	UFC Fight Night: Almeida vs. Garbrandt	May 29, 2016	2	3:02	Las Vegas, United States	
Loss	12–4	James Krause	Decision (unanimous)	UFC Fight Night: Cowboy vs. Cowboy	February 21, 2016	3	5:00	Pittsburgh, United States	
Win	12–3	Elias Silvério	Decision (unanimous)	UFC Fight Night: Holloway vs. Oliveira	August 23, 2015	3	5:00	Saskatoon, Canada	
Loss	11–3	John Makdessi	TKO (punches)	UFC 186	April 25, 2015	1	4:53	Montreal, Canada	Catchweight (160 lbs) bout.
Win	11–2	Derek Boyle	TKO (body kick and punches)	WSOF 18	February 12, 2015	3	0:31	Edmonton, Canada	
Win	10–2	Marcus Edwards	TKO (punches)	MFC 41	October 3, 2014	2	0:29	Edmonton, Canada	
Win	9–2	Jerrid Burke	TKO (punches)	MFC 40	May 9, 2014	2	0:43	Edmonton, Canada	
Loss	8–2	Jesse Ronson	Submission (rear-naked choke)	AFC 19	July 5, 2013	2	1:59	Edmonton, Canada	Lost the AFC Lightweight Championship.
Win	8–1	Stephen Beaumont	Submission (guillotine choke)	AFC 14	November 23, 2012	1	2:50	Edmonton, Canada	Won the AFC Lightweight Championship.
Win	7–1	Tim Smith	Submission (rear-naked choke)	Unified MMA 12	July 6, 2012	2	3:41	Edmonton, Canada	Won the Unified MMA Welterweight Championship.
Win	6–1	Derek Boyle	Decision (unanimous)	Score Fighting Series 4	March 16, 2012	3	5:00	Hamilton, Canada	
Win	5–1	Taylor Solomon	Decision (unanimous)	Global Warriors Fighting Championship	August 13, 2011	3	5:00	Hamilton, Canada	
Loss	4–1	Dave Mazany	Decision (unanimous)	AMMA 6: Edmonton	March 11, 2011	3	5:00	Edmonton, Canada	
Win	4–0	Tony Hervey	Decision (split)	Awada Combat Club: ERA Fight Night	December 3, 2010	3	5:00	Edmonton, Canada	
Win	3–0	Leo Constant	TKO (punches)	Heat XC 6: Bragging Rights	October 15, 2010	1	0:34	Edmonton, Canada	
Win	2–0	Sean Sivell	KO (punches)	Iroquois: MMA Championship 5	September 27, 2008	1	2:36	Brampton, Canada	
Win	1–0	Alain Sylvester	Decision (unanimous)	Iroquois: MMA Championship 4	June 21, 2008	5	0:00	Brampton, Canada	

== Muay Thai and kickboxing record ==
Professional Muay Thai and kickboxing record
62 wins (13 (T)KOs), 9 losses
Date	Result	Opponent	Event	Location	Method	Round	Time
2014-02-23	Loss	(Germany) Enriko Kehl	K-1 World MAX 2013 World Championship Tournament Final 4, Semi Finals	Baku, Azerbaijan	Decision (unanimous)	3	3:00
2013-12-28	Win	(Colombia) Christopher Mena	K-1 World MAX 2013 World Championship Tournament Quarter Finals - Part 1, Quarter Finals	Foshan, China	Decision	3	3:00
2013-09-14	Win	(Brazil) Wallace Lopes	K-1 World MAX 2013 World Championship Tournament Final 16, First Round	Mallorca, Spain	KO (liver kick)	1	
2013-06-08	Win	(United States) Justin Greskiewicz	K-1 World Qualifying Tour 2013 in Calgary	Calgary, Canada	TKO	1	
2013-03-02	Win	(Canada) Sean Mckinnon	Journey WMC	Calgary, Canada	Decision	5	3:00
Wins WMC North American Muay Thai Championship
2013-01-25	Win	(France) Remy Bonnel	Lion Fight 8	Las Vegas, United States	Decision	3	3:00
2012-11-03	Win	(Canada) Troy Sheridan	Journey Fight Series VIII	Calgary, Canada	Decision	5	3:00
2012-06-09	Win	(United States) Nate Chambers	Journey Fight Series VI	Calgary, Canada	KO (punches)	1	1:56
2010-07-?	Loss	(Thailand) Pajonsuk	Enfusion Kickboxing Tournament, 2nd Round	Ko Samui, Thailand	Injury	3	
2010-07-?	Win	(Romania) Szűcs Barnabás	Enfusion Kickboxing Tournament, 1st Round	Ko Samui, Thailand	Decision	3	3:00
2009-09-12	Loss	(Belarus) Dmitry Valent	W.K.N. World GP Big-8 Tournament '09, Title Fight	Minsk, Belarus	Decision	5	3:00
2009-05-16	Loss	(Netherlands) Joerie Mes	It's Showtime 2009 Amsterdam	Amsterdam, Netherlands	TKO (ref. stop./3 knockdowns)	3	
2009-01-17	Win	(Sweden) Farnam Mirzai	W.M.A. Gala	Mengzi City, China	TKO (ref. stop.)	2	
Wins W.M.A. Muaythai middleweight world title -70 kg.
2008-11-22	win	(United States) James Martinez	IQMMA VI-Iroquois MMA/MuayThai Championships	Ontario, Canada	TKO (elbow to the collarbone & knee to the body)	1	2:34
2008-10-27	Loss	(Belarus) Dmitry Valent	W.M.C. I-1 World Grand Slam '08, Semi Finals	Hong Kong	Decision (unanimous)	3	3:00
2008-09-06	Loss	(South Africa) Warren Stevelmans	It's Showtime 2008 Alkmaar	Alkmaar, Netherlands	Decision	3	3:00
2008-08-15	Win	(Canada) Adam Higson	Gladiators Muay Thai & MMA	Winnipeg, Canada	KO (right high kick)	3	1:50
2008-06-21	win	(Canada) Alain Sylvestre	Iroquois - MMA Championships 4	Ontario, Canada	Decision	5	3:00
2007-09-27	Loss	(Democratic Republic of the Congo) Chris Ngimbi	Combat Sports Challenge 22 "The Reckoning"	Richmond, VA, USA	Decision (unanimous)	5	3:00
Loses W.K.A. Muaythai super welterweight world title -70 kg.
2007-05-12	win	(Canada) Trevor Smandich	Shin Do Kumite	Jacksonville, United States	Decision	5	3:00
2007-03-24	Win	(Democratic Republic of the Congo) Chris Ngimbi	Combat Sports Challenge 19	Richmond, Virginia, United States	Decision (majority)	5	3:00
Wins vacant W.K.A. Muaythai super welterweight world title -70 kg.
2006-12-08	win	(United States) Michael Mananquil	Shin Do Kumate' XI - Battle of the Heavyweights	Florida, USA	TKO (elbow)	1	1:45
2006-09-03	Loss	(United States) Justin Greskiewicz	U.S.K.B.A. Action Sports World Championships	Rahway, United States	Decision	3	3:00
Fight was for U.S.K.B.A. middleweight North American title.
2006-05-00	Win	(Serbia) Christian Endure	Fighting Spirit	Oneida Nation, Canada	KO	3	
2006-04-21	Win	(United States) Abdlamine El Khezzani	Friday Nights Fights	New York City, United States	TKO (ref. stop./3 knockdowns)	1	
2006-03-00	Win	(United States) Steve Rudinski	IUKA North American Title	Detroit, United States	KO	3	1:45
Wins W.K.A. Muaythai junior middleweight North American title -71 kg.
Legend: Win Loss Draw/no contest Notes

Amateur Muay Thai record
Date	Result	Opponent	Event	Location	Method	Round	Time
2007-03-11	Loss	(Belarus) Vitaly Gurkov	W.M.F. Amateur Muaythai World Championships 2007, Final	Bangkok, Thailand			
Wins W.M.F. Amateur Muaythai World Championships '07 Silver Medal -71 kg.
2007-03-08	win	(Poland) Marcin Parcheta	W.M.F. Amateur Muaythai World Championships 2007, Semi Finals	Bangkok, Thailand	Walkover	N/A	N/A
2007-03-07	Win	(Spain) Alejandro Garcia	W.M.F. Amateur Muaythai World Championships 2007, Quarter Finals	Bangkok, Thailand	Decision	4	2:00
2007-03-06	Win	(France) Mourad Bourachid	W.M.F. Amateur Muaythai World Championships 2007, 1st Round	Bangkok, Thailand	Decision	4	2:00
2006-12-17	Win	(United States) Justin Greskiewicz	WMF Junior Middleweight Muay Thai	United States	Decision (unanimous)	5	3:00
Wins W.M.F. Amateur Muaythai junior middleweight North American title -71 kg.
Legend: Win Loss Draw/no contest Notes

== Professional boxing record ==
2 fights	1 win	1 loss
By decision	1	1

No.	Result	Record	Opponent	Type	Round, time	Date	Location	Notes
2	Win	1–1	(Canada) Matt Krayco	UD	4	26 May 2023	The Venue at River Cree, Alberta, Canada	
1	Loss	0–1	(Canada) Paul Bzdel	SD	4	9 December 2011	Shaw Conference Centre, Edmonton, Canada	

== See also ==
- List of male kickboxers
- List of K-1 events
- List of It's Showtime events
- List of Canadian UFC fighters
