= Artur Kyshenko =

Ukrainian kickboxer (born 1986)

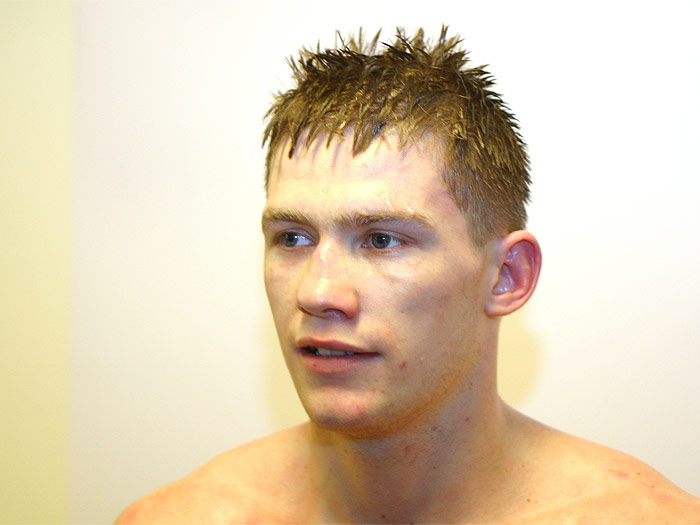
- Born: November 14, 1986 (age 39); Odesa, Ukrainian SSR, Soviet Union
- Native name: Артур Кишенко
- Other names: White (Білий), Squirrel (Білка)
- Nationality: Ukrainian
- Height: 1.80 m (5 ft 11 in)
- Weight: 77.1 kg (170 lb; 12.14 st)
- Division: Lightweight; Welterweight; Middleweight; Super Middleweight
- Reach: 72 in (180 cm)
- Style: Kickboxing
- Fighting out of: Amsterdam, Netherlands
- Team: Kyshenko Gym (2016–present)
- Trainer: Pavel Bătrînu
- Years active: 2003–present

Professional boxing record
- Total: 1
- Wins: 1

Kickboxing record
- Total: 89
- Wins: 72
- By knockout: 37
- Losses: 14
- By knockout: 4
- Draws: 1
- No contests: 2

Other information
- Website: kyshenkoartur.com
- Boxing record from BoxRec
- Last updated on: December 2019

Artur Kyshenko (Ukrainian: Артур Кишенко, born November 14, 1986) is a Ukrainian middleweight kickboxer, fighting out of Kyshenko Gym. He is the 2015 Kunlun Fight 80 kg Tournament World Champion and K-1 World MAX 2008 Finalist. He was ranked as the #1 Welterweight in the world by Combat Press from September 2017 until February 2020, when he transitioned into boxing. He had been continually ranked in the welterweight top ten by Combat Press since September 2014. On 24 July 2019, Kyshenko was suspended for 4 years by National Anti-Doping Agency of France (AFLD) after testing positive for prohibited substances.

== Kickboxing career ==
=== Early career ===
Artur started boxing at age eleven, turning to Kickboxing a year later at the Captain Odesa gym in his home town of Odesa, Ukraine where he was trained by the Romanian Ukrainian Pavel A. Bătrînu. In 2003, aged just 16, he entered the IMFA Amateur Muaythai World Championships held in Almaty, Kazakhstan finishing with a bronze medal in the 63.5-kilogram (140 lb) category. He followed this up the next year by winning a gold medal in the I.F.M.A. European championships and becoming Fighting Arts world champion. He was quickly becoming Ukraine's most promising young fighter and his winning of two national championships in 2005 and 2006 reinforced this view.

=== K-1 ===
It was not until 2006 that Artur became known internationally, making his K-1 MAX debut at the K-1 East Europe MAX 2006 event. Artur won the event in Vilnius, Lithuania in dominating fashion, stopping all three opponents on the night to book his place at a reserve fight at K-1 MAX's premier event. He also won gold on the amateur circuit – this time coming top of the 71 kg (157 lb) at the I.F.M.A. World Championships held in Bangkok, Thailand. He then made an appearance at the K-1 World MAX 2006 Final defeated the wily veteran and multiple world champion Rayen Simson in their reserve match.

2007 was another useful year for Artur who made a number of victorious appearances at K-1 MAX events including an elimination fight win over K-1 MAX Seoul champion Su Hwan Lee at the K-1 World MAX 2007 World Tournament Final Elimination which meant he qualified for the quarter-finals stages of the K-1 MAX 2007 final. Artur made the semi-finals defeating the hard-hitting Mike Zambidis before losing to former champ and Japanese kickboxing legend Masato by KO despite being ahead on the judges' scorecards early on in the bout. He finished the year by winning gold for the second year in a row at the I.F.M.A World Championships.

Artur returned to K-1 action the next year defeating Jordan Tai and Yasuhiro Kido at elimination fights to make the final 4 in Tokyo. He met reigning MAX champion Andy Souwer in the semi-finals outworking the heavily favoured Dutchman to claim an extension round victory and face the previous year's finalist Masato in a rematch. Artur performed excellently in the final bout dropping Masato in the second but as he was unable to press his home his advantage the match went into an extension round which the local fighter won by a unanimous decision – a result some felt should never have gone into an extra round as the Ukrainian may have done enough over three rounds to have claimed victory. He entered the final again the following year destroying Alviar Lima in the final 16 before losing to Andy Souwer in the quarter-finals.

Of recent Artur has been on somewhat of a recent downward spiral with reports of the 5'11 Ukrainian having difficulties making the 70 kg weight limit and a mixed patch of results which saw victories over Murat Direkçi and Marcus Öberg being tempered with defeats to the un-fancied Hinata Watanabe and Mohammed Khamal – the latter costing him a quarter final place at the K-1 World MAX Final 2010. He has also switched gyms, moving from Captain Odesa in Ukraine to Mike's Gym in Amsterdam at the tail-end of 2010. Kyshenko has been on a roll with his new gym, picking up wins against strong opposition such as Gago Drago and Nieky Holzken.

Even though Kyshenko's stance is mostly orthodox, many claim that due to the recent change of gyms, he is now a dual-stance, as seen in his fight against Gago Drago. (Editor's note: dual-stance meaning he uses both the orthodox and south-paw stance.)

He made short work of Chris Ngimbi in the quarter-finals of the K-1 World MAX 2012 World Championship Tournament Final before outpointing Andy Souwer in the semis, in the fourth match of their rivalry. He was then KO'd by his stable mate Murthel Groenhart in the final in Athens, Greece on December 15, 2012.

=== It's Showtime and other promotions ===
Kyshenko lost to Abraham Roqueñi via a controversial split decision at Enfusion Live: Barcelona in Barcelona, Spain on March 9, 2012. He also missed the contracted weight of 70 kg/154 lb by 2.5 kg/5.5 lb.

Kyshenko defeated Denis Makouski via TKO due to injury in round one at K-1 World Grand Prix 2013 in Vilnius, Lithuania on April 27, 2013, to win the KOK -71 kg title.

He competed in the -71 kg tournament at the Legend Fighting Show in Moscow, Russia on May 25, 2013, facing Yuri Bessmertny in the semi-finals. He defeated Yuri Bessmertny via an extra round unanimous decision the semi-finals but was injured in the bout and could not fight in the final, replaced Alim Nabiev.

He signed with Glory in November 2013 to compete in their -77 kg/170 lb welterweight division.

At the KOK World Grand Prix 2013 in Magdeburg, Germany on November 23, 2013, Kyshenko dropped Syrian-German journeyman Baker Bakarat with a body kick before winning by a TKO due to a cut in round one.

In his promotional debut with Glory, Kyshenko took a unanimous decision over Kenmun at Glory 13: Tokyo in Tokyo, Japan on December 21, 2013.

He knocked out Wen Jindo with a first round high kick at Hero Legends in Jinan, China on December 3, 2014.

He lost to Karapet Karapetyan by unanimous decision on the Glory 14: Zagreb undercard in Zagreb, Croatia on March 8, 2014.

He was scheduled to fight Dzhabar Askerov at Legend 3: Pour Homme in Milan, Italy on April 5, 2014 but conceded that he would be unable to make the contracted weight of -71 kg/156 lb and was replaced by his stablemate Murthel Groenhart.

Kyshenko was scheduled to fight Radoslaw Paczuski during 2014 KOK WGP in Gdnask. He won the fight by TKO, after Radoslaw's corner threw in the towel in the third round.

He fought with King of Kings again two months later, when he took on Andrei Leuştean. He defeated Andrei by unanimous decision.

=== Kunlun Fight ===
Kyshenko fought Bai Jinbin during Kunlun Fight 18. He won the fight with a right hook KO. He won his second fight with Kunlun Fight as well, by knocking Jonatan Oliveira out in the third round. Kyshenko beat Dmitry Valent during Kunlun Fight 25 by split decision.

After winning his next three fights against Cédric Tousch, Ruben Lee and Hicham El Gaoui, Kyshenko participated in the 2015 Kunlun Fight 80 kg tournament. He defeated Eyevan Danenberg by KO in the semifinals, and Dmitry Valent by KO in the finals.

After winning the tournament, Kyshenko would extend his winning streak to 18 straight fights without a loss. He defeated Murthel Groenhart by an extra round decision at Kunlun Fight 43, Jonatan Oliveira by decision at Kunlun Fight 45, Alex Pereira by TKO at Kunlun Fight 48, Zakaria Baitar by TKO at Kunlun Fight 60, Gabriele Casella by decision at Kunlun Fight 62, Constantino Nanga by KO at Rumble Of The Kings, Andrey Chekhonin by KO at Kunlun Fight 68, and Timur Aylyarov by TKO at Kunlun Fight 74.

During MAS Fight Ling Shan Grand Prix, Kyshenko took part in a three on one match. He fought consecutively a round with each of the three opponents including Rambo, with a win being awarded to either him or one of his opponents, should a KO be scored. The fight ended in a draw since no one managed a KO.

=== Arena Fight ===
Kyshenko fought Yohan Lidon for the Arena Fight Middleweight Kickboxing Title in June 2019. He beat Lidon by a unanimous decision.

==== Doping suspension ====
On 5 March 2021, it was announced that the Arena Fight Championship stripped its middleweight title from Artur Kyshenko and installed Yohan Lidon as champion after Kyshenko failed a doping test. The Ukrainian was suspended by National Anti-Doping Agency of France (AFLD) until July 24, 2023.

== Titles ==
Professional

- 2015 Kunlun Fight -80kg Tournament World Champion
- 2013 King of Kings -71 kg champion
- 2012 K-1 Rising ~ K-1 WORLD MAX 2012 runner up
- 2011 It's Showtime "Fast & Furious 70MAX" runner up
- 2008 K-1 World MAX Final runner up
- 2006 K-1 East Europe MAX champion
- 2004 Fighting Arts world champion

Amateur

- 2010 SportAccord Combat Games in Beijing, China (bronze) -71 kg
- 2007 I.F.M.A. World Muay Thai Championships in Bangkok, Thailand (gold) -71 kg
- 2006 I.F.M.A. World Muay Thai Championships in Bangkok, Thailand (gold) -71 kg
- 2006 Ukrainian Muay Thai Championships in Odesa, Ukraine (gold) -71 kg
- 2005 Ukrainian Muay Thai Championships in Odesa, Ukraine (gold) -75 kg
- 2004 I.F.M.A. World Muay Thai Championships in Bangkok, Thailand (gold) -67 kg
- 2004 I.F.M.A. European Muay Thai Championships (gold)
- 2003 I.F.M.A. World Muay Thai Championships in Almaty, Kazakhstan (bronze) -63.5 kg

== Professional boxing record ==
1 fight	1 win	0 losses
By decision	1	0

No.	Result	Record	Opponent	Type	Round, time	Date	Location	Notes
1	Win	1–0	(Colombia) Beibi Berrocal	UD	6	12 Dec 2019	Pabellón de la Vall d'Hebron, Barcelona, Spain	Professional debut

== Professional kickboxing record ==
Professional Kickboxing Record
72 Wins (37 (T)KO's), 14 Losses, 1 Draws, 2 No Contest
Date	Result	Opponent	Event	Location	Method	Round	Time
2019-06-08	NC	(France) Yohan Lidon	Arena Fight	Aix-en-Provence, France	Decision (Unanimous)	5	3:00
For Arena Fight Middleweight Kickboxing Title (-80 kg). Originally a UD win for Kyshenko, later ruled a DQ after Kyshenko failed a drug test.
2018-05-13	Win	(Russia) Timur Aylyarov	Kunlun Fight 74	China	TKO (Punches)	3	2:40
2017-12-17	Win	(Russia) Andrei Chekhonin	Kunlun Fight 68	China	KO (Left Body Hook)	1	1:29
2017-11-25	Win	(Sweden) Constantino Nanga	Rumble Of The Kings	Sweden	KO (Left Hook)	3	
2017-06-10	Win	(Italy) Gabriele Casella	Kunlun Fight 62	Bangkok, Thailand	Decision (Unanimous)	3	3:00
2017-04-23	Win	(Belgium) Zakaria Baitar	Kunlun Fight 60	Guizhou, China	TKO (Right Cross + Left Body Hook)	2	1:15
2016-07-31	Win	(Brazil) Alex Pereira	Kunlun Fight 48	Jining, China	TKO (punches)	2	2:55
2016-06-05	Win	(Brazil) Jonatan Oliveira	Kunlun Fight 45	Chengdou, China	Decision (Unanimous)	3	3:00
2016-04-23	Win	(Netherlands) Murthel Groenhart	Kunlun Fight 43	Zhoukou, China	Extra Round Decision	4	3:00
2015-12-19	Win	(Belarus) Dmitry Valent	Kunlun Fight 35 – 80 kg Tournament, Final	Luoyang, China	KO(Punches)	1	0:22
Wins the Kunlun Fight -80kg Tournament World Champion.
2015-12-19	Win	(Netherlands) Eyevan Danenberg	Kunlun Fight 35 – 80 kg Tournament, Semi-final	Luoyang, China	KO(Right hook)	2	3:00
2015-11-21	Win	(Morocco) Hicham El Gaoui	Enfusion Live 34	Groningen, Netherlands	Decision	3	3:00
2015-10-24	Win	(Spain) Ruben Lee	IFC 3	Barcelona, Spain	Decision	3	3:00
2015-09-12	Win	(France) Cédric Tousch	Its Fight Time	Germany,	Decision(Unanimous)	3	3:00
2015-05-15	Win	(Belarus) Dmitry Valent	Kunlun Fight 25	Bratislava, Slovakia	Decision (split)	3	3:00
2015-04-26	Win	(Brazil) Jonatan Oliveira	Kunlun Fight 23 – 80 kg Tournament, Quarter-finals	Chansha, Hunan, China	KO (Left body hook)	3	1:20
2015-02-01	Win	(China) Bai Jinbin	Kunlun Fight 18	Guangzhou, China	KO (Right Hook)	1	2:48
2014-12-20	Win	(Romania) Andrei Leuştean	KOK World GP 2014 in Chișinău	Chișinău, Moldova	Decision (unanimous)	3	3:00
2014-10-17	Win	(Poland) Radoslaw Paczuski	KOK World GP 2014 in Gdańsk	Gdańsk, Poland	TKO (towel thrown)	3	0:38
2014-03-08	Loss	(Armenia) Karapet Karapetyan	Glory 14: Zagreb	Zagreb, Croatia	Decision (unanimous)	3	3:00
2014-01-03	Win	(China) Wen Jindo	Hero Legends	Jinan, China	KO (right high kick)	1	1:23
2013-12-21	Win	(Japan) Kenmun	Glory 13: Tokyo	Tokyo, Japan	Decision (unanimous)	3	3:00
2013-11-23	Win	(Syria) Baker Barakat	KOK World Grand Prix 2013	Magdeburg, Germany	TKO (cut)	1	
2013-05-25	Win	(Belarus) Yuri Bessmertny	Legend 1, Semi-finals	Moscow, Russia	Ext. r. decision (unanimous)	4	3:00
2013-04-27	Win	(Poland) Denis Makouski	K-1 World Grand Prix 2013 in Vilnius	Vilnius, Lithuania	TKO (injury)	1	
Wins the KOK -71kg title.
2013-03-09	Loss	(Spain) Abraham Roqueñi	Enfusion Live: Barcelona	Barcelona, Spain	Decision (split)	3	3:00
2012-12-15	Loss	(Suriname) Murthel Groenhart	K-1 World MAX 2012 World Championship Tournament Final, Final	Athens, Greece	KO (right overhand)	3	0:54
For the K-1 World MAX 2012 World Championship Tournament title.
2012-12-15	Win	(Netherlands) Andy Souwer	K-1 World MAX 2012 World Championship Tournament Final, Semi-finals	Athens, Greece	Decision (unanimous)	3	3:00
2012-12-15	Win	(Democratic Republic of the Congo) Chris Ngimbi	K-1 World MAX 2012 World Championship Tournament Final, Quarter-finals	Athens, Greece	TKO (referee stoppage)	2	1:48
2012-05-27	Win	(South Korea) Su Hwan Lee	K-1 World MAX 2012 World Championship Tournament Final 16, First Round	Madrid, Spain	KO (Left punch)	2	
2012-03-24	Loss	(Italy) Giorgio Petrosyan	Fight Code	Milan, Italy	Decision (Unanimous)	3	3:00
2012-02-05	Win	(Italy) Roberto Cocco	Thai Boxe Mania	Turin, Italy	Decision (Unanimous)	3	3:00
2011-11-26	Win	(Thailand) Yodsanklai Fairtex	Rumble of the Kings 2011	Stockholm, Sweden	Decision (Unanimous)	3	3:00
2011-09-24	Loss	(Netherlands) Robin van Roosmalen	It's Showtime "Fast & Furious 70MAX" Final	Brussels, Belgium	KO (Left hook)	1	2:20
For It's Showtime "Fast & Furious 70MAX" tournament title.
2011-09-24	Win	(Netherlands) Andy Souwer	It's Showtime "Fast & Furious 70MAX" Semi-final	Brussels, Belgium	Decision (Unanimous)	3	3:00
2011-09-24	Win	(Armenia) Gago Drago	It's Showtime "Fast & Furious 70MAX" Quarter-final	Brussels, Belgium	TKO (referee stoppage)	3	1:03
2011-05-28	Win	(Netherlands) Nieky Holzken	United Glory 14: 2010–2011 World Series Finals	Moscow, Russia	Decision (Unanimous)	3	3:00
2011-03-06	Win	(Armenia) Gago Drago	It's Showtime Sporthallen Zuid	Amsterdam, Netherlands	Decision (5–0)	3	3:00
2010-11-27	Win	(Sweden) Marcus Öberg	K-1 Scandinavia Rumble of the Kings 2010	Stockholm, Sweden	Decision	3	3:00
2010-10-03	Loss	(Morocco) Mohammed Khamal	K-1 World MAX 2010 Final 16 - Part 2	Seoul, South Korea	Decision (Unanimous)	3	3:00
Fails to qualify for K-1 World MAX 2010 Final.
2010-07-31	Loss	(Japan) Hinata Watanabe	KRS: "RISE 68"	Bunkyo, Tokyo, Japan	TKO (Left middle kick)	3	1:23
2010-05-29	Win	(Turkey) Murat Direkçi	It's Showtime 2010 Amsterdam	Amsterdam, Netherlands	Decision (4–1)	3	3:00
2009-12-12	Win	(Slovakia) Vladimir Moravcik	K-1 ColliZion 2009 Final Tournament, Super Fight	Prague, Czech Republic	KO (Right high kick)	2	2:43
2009-11-20	Win	(Sweden) Abdoulile Joof	K-1 Rumble of the Kings 2009 in Stockholm, Super Fight	Stockholm, Sweden	Decision (Unanimous)	3	3:00
2009-10-26	Win	(Iran) Toofan Salafzoon	K-1 World MAX 2009 Final, Super Fight	Yokohama, Japan	KO (Right cross)	3	1:50
2009-07-13	Loss	(Netherlands) Andy Souwer	K-1 World MAX 2009 Final 8	Tokyo, Japan	Ext R. Decision (Unanimous)	4	3:00
Fails to qualify for K-1 World MAX 2009 Final, although will be invited to take part in a super fight.
2009-04-21	Win	(Cape Verde) Alviar Lima	K-1 World MAX 2009 Final 16	Fukuoka, Japan	TKO (Ref. stop/two knockdowns)	1	2:56
Qualifies for K-1 World MAX 2009 Final 8.
2008-12-31	Win	(Japan) Yoshihiro Sato	Dynamite!! 2008	Saitama, Japan	Decision (Majority)	3	3:00
2008-11-22	Win	(Lithuania) Vadim Chromyh	K-1 World GP 2008 in Riga	Riga, Latvia	KO (Kicks)	2	
2008-10-01	Loss	(Japan) Masato	K-1 World MAX 2008 Final, Final	Tokyo, Japan	Ext R. Decision (Unanimous)	4	3:00
Fight was for K-1 World MAX 2008 tournament title.
2008-10-01	Win	(Netherlands) Andy Souwer	K-1 World MAX 2008 Final, Semi-finals	Tokyo, Japan	Ext R. Decision (Unanimous)	4	3:00
2008-07-07	Win	(Japan) Yasuhiro Kido	K-1 World MAX 2008 Final 8	Tokyo, Japan	Decision (Unanimous)	3	3:00
Qualifies for K-1 World MAX 2008 Final.
2008-04-09	Win	(New Zealand) Jordan Tai	K-1 World MAX 2008 Final 16	Tokyo, Japan	Ext R. Decision (Unanimous)	4	3:00
Qualifies for K-1 World MAX 2008 Final 8.
2008-02-02	Win	(Japan) Shingo Garyu	K-1 World MAX 2008 Japan Tournament, Super Fight	Tokyo, Japan	KO (Left hook)	1	3:00
2007-10-03	Loss	(Japan) Masato	K-1 World MAX 2007 World Championship Final, Semi-finals	Tokyo, Japan	KO (Left hook)	2	0:41
2007-10-03	Win	(Greece) Mike Zambidis	K-1 World MAX 2007 World Championship Final, Quarter-finals	Tokyo, Japan	Ext R. Decision (Unanimous)	4	3:00
2007-07-21	Win	(South Korea) Chi Bin Lim	K-1 Fighting Network KHAN 2007	Seoul, Korea	TKO (Low kicks)	2	1:04
2007-06-28	Win	(South Korea) Su Hwan Lee	K-1 World MAX 2007 World Tournament Open	Tokyo, Japan	KO (Left hook)	3	1:11
Qualifies for K-1 World MAX 2007 World Championship Final.
2007-03-17	Win	(Latvia) Sandris Tomsons	K-1 East Europe MAX 2007, Super Fight	Vilnius, Lithuania	TKO (Ref stop/Three knockdowns)	1	
2006-12-20	Loss	(Russia) Mikhail Chalykh	W.K.B.F. World title (76 kg) Semi-finals	Moscow, Russia	Ext R. Decision (Split)	4	3:00
2006-09-04	Loss	(Japan) Hayato	K-1 World MAX 2006 Champions' Challenge	Tokyo, Japan	Ext R. Decision (Unanimous)	4	3:00
2006-06-30	Win	(Suriname) Rayen Simson	K-1 World MAX 2006 World Tournament Final, Reserve Fight	Yokohama, Japan	Decision (Majority)	3	3:00
2006-05-10	NC	(Russia) Ibrahim Tamazaev	W.B.K.F. European title @ Club "Arbat"	Moscow, Russia	No contest (Head butt)	1	
2006-03-29	Win	(Russia) Aleksander Demchenko	Fight Club Arbat	Moscow, Russia	TKO	3	
2006-03-10	Win	(Lithuania) Marius Buzinskas	K-1 East Europe MAX 2006, Final	Vilnius, Lithuania	TKO (Corner stoppage)	1	1:42
Wins K-1 East Europe MAX 2006 tournament title and qualifies for reserve fight at K-1 World MAX 2006 World Tournament Final.
2006-03-10	Win	(Belarus) Jurij Bulat	K-1 East Europe MAX 2006, Semi-finals	Vilnius, Lithuania	TKO (Doctor stoppage)	3	1:16
2006-03-10	Win	(Lithuania) Egidijus Brandisauskas	K-1 East Europe MAX 2006, Quarter-finals	Vilnius, Lithuania	KO (Liver punch)	1	2:20
2005-12-09	Draw	(Belarus) Denis Laevskiy	"Ukraine vs Belarus"	Sevastopol, Ukraine	Decision draw	3	3:00
2004-02-11	Loss	(Kyrgyzstan) Alen Ofoio	"Ukraine vs Kyrgyz" @ Club "Arbat"	Moscow, Russia	Decision (Unanimous)	3	3:00
Legend: Win Loss Draw/No contest Notes

== Amateur kickboxing record ==
Amateur Kickboxing Record
119 Wins, 13 Losses
Date	Result	Opponent	Event	Location	Method	Round	Time
2010-08-29	Loss	(Thailand) Teerapong Dee	SportAccord Combat Games 2010, Semi-finals	Beijing, China	Decision (Unanimous)	4	2:00
Wins SportAccord Combat Games 2010 Bronze Medal -71 kg.
2010-08-29	Win	(Kazakhstan) Almaz Smagulov	SportAccord Combat Games 2010, Quarter-finals	Beijing, China	Decision (Unanimous)	4	2:00
2007-12-05	Win	(Kazakhstan) Dias Kassenov	W.M.C.-I.F.M.A. World Muay Thai Championships, Final	Bangkok, Thailand	Decision	5	2:00
Wins IFMA World Muay Thai Championships 2007 Gold medal (-71kg).
2007-12-02	Win	(Germany) Alex Schmidt	W.M.C.-I.F.M.A. World Muay Thai Championships, Semi-finals	Bangkok, Thailand	Decision	5	2:00
2007-11-27	Win	(Iran) Ghader Mirshamsi	W.M.C.-I.F.M.A. World Muay Thai Championships, Quarter-finals	Bangkok, Thailand	TKO (Referee stoppage)	2	
2006-06-07	Win	(France) Karim Bezouh	W.M.C.-I.F.M.A. World Muay Thai Championships, Final	Bangkok, Thailand	TKO (No show)	1	0:00
Wins I.F.M.A. World Muay Thai Championships 2006 Gold medal -71 kg.
2006-06-05	Win	(Belgium) Mohamed Rahhaoui	W.M.C.-I.F.M.A. World Muay Thai Championships, Semi-finals	Bangkok, Thailand	TKO	3	
2006-06-03	Win	(Kazakhstan) Dias Kassenov	W.M.C.-I.F.M.A. World Muay Thai Championships, Quarter-finals	Bangkok, Thailand	KO (Punch)	4	
2006-06-02	Win	(Moldova) Constantin Țuțu	W.M.C.-I.F.M.A. World Muay Thai Championships, 1st round	Bangkok, Thailand	TKO (Low kicks)	2	
2006-04-02	Win	(Ukraine) Oleksandr Medvedev	11th Ukrainian Muay Thai Championships	Odesa, Ukraine			
Wins 11th Ukrainian Muay Thai Championships Gold medal -71 kg.
2005-04-03	Win	(Ukraine) Dmytro Kirpan	10th Ukrainian Muay Thai Championships	Odesa, Ukraine			
Wins 10th Ukrainian Muay Thai Championships Gold Medal -75 kg.
Legend: Win Loss Draw/No contest Notes

== See also ==
- List of K-1 events
- List of K-1 champions
- List of It's Showtime events
- List of male kickboxers
