= Perry Ubeda =

Dutch mixed martial arts fighter

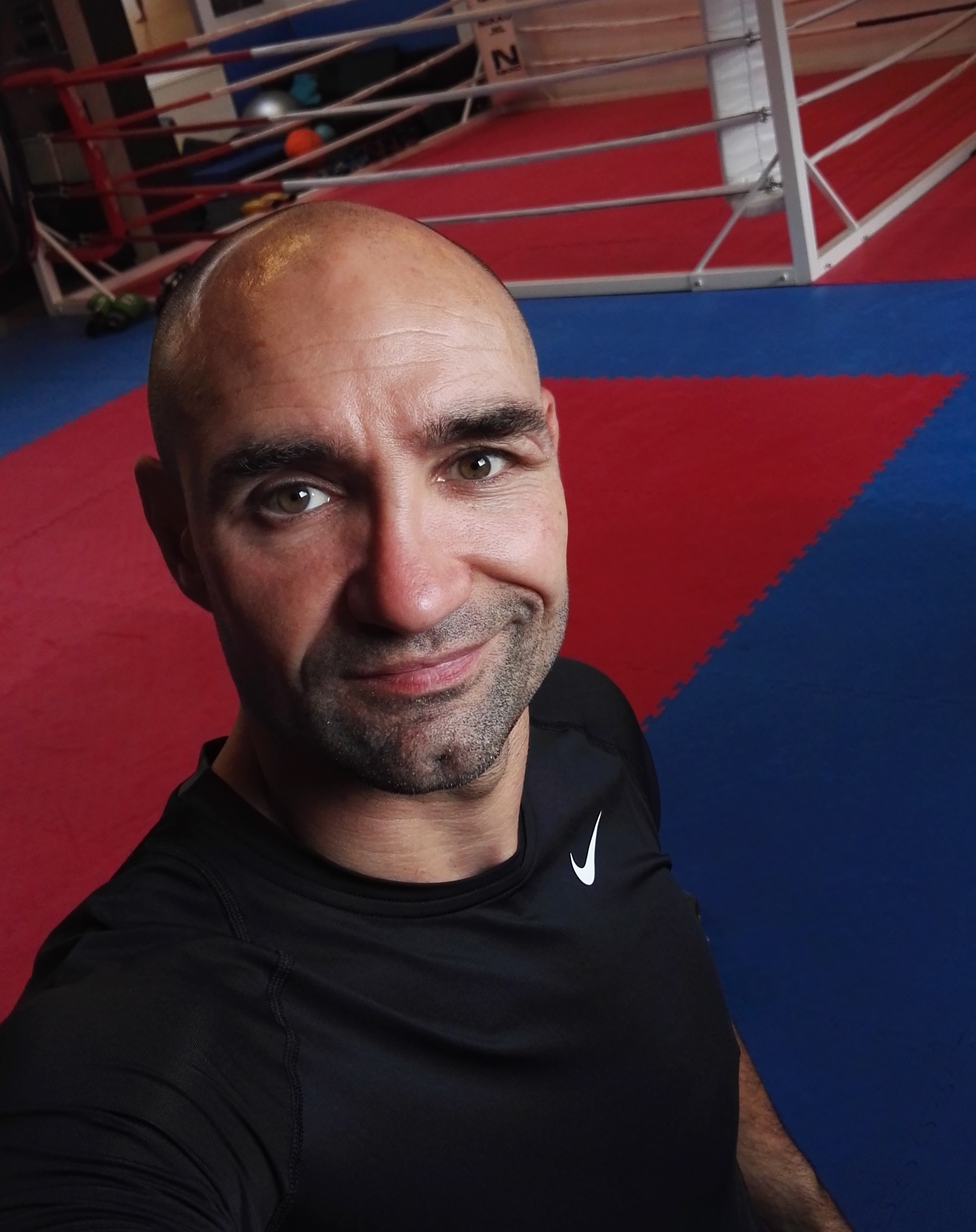
- Born: Perry M. Johannes Ubeda; September 12, 1971 (age 55); Nijmegen, Netherlands
- Other names: Dynamite
- Height: 1.78 m (5 ft 10 in)
- Weight: 76 kg (168 lb; 12.0 st)
- Division: Super Middleweight
- Style: Kickboxing, Boxing
- Stance: Orthodox
- Team: Ubeda Gym; Chakuriki Gym
- Years active: 1980-2009 (29 years)

Professional boxing record
- Total: 3
- Wins: 3
- By knockout: 1
- Losses: 0

Kickboxing record
- Total: 141
- Wins: 103
- By knockout: 60
- Losses: 35
- Draws: 2
- No contests: 1

Mixed martial arts record
- Total: 3
- Wins: 1
- By knockout: 1
- Losses: 2
- By knockout: 1
- By submission: 1

Other information
- Boxing record from BoxRec
- Mixed martial arts record from Sherdog
- Last updated on: 1 October 2010

Perry M. Johannes Ubeda (born 15 September 1971) is a Dutch former kickboxer. Between 1992 and 2008 he won thirteen titles (national and international) in kickboxing, as well as titles in taekwondo and pro-boxing and he is also a keen Motocross racer. Ubeda is now retired and runs his own gym, Ubeda Gym, in his home town of Nijmegen.

== Biography and career ==
Ubeda began his career in 1980 and had his first title fight in 1986, losing to Andre Masseurs in their match for the Dutch Youth kickboxing belt. In 1992 he fought Sedou Kiatsongrit for the W.M.T.C (now W.M.C) world title but lost. He bounced back from that defeat by winning the I.K.B.F European title in Clermont-Ferrand, France, defeating his opponent by a knockout.

In 1995 Ubeda won the W.M.T.A world title. He defeated the reigning champion Azem Maksutaj, knocking him down three times on the way to a first round stoppage victory in Nijmegen, Netherlands. In 1996 Ubeda won a Taekwondo event in Tokyo, winning the All Japan Open Taekwondo Championship, winning all three of his matches by first-round knockout. This victory was made even more impressive as he was the lightest fighter at a tournament where some of the contestants weighed up to 90 kg (198 lbs). Later that year he defeated Rodney Faverus to win the W.K.A. Dutch title.

Between 1997 and 2000, Ubeda would take part in a number of high-profile bouts, defeating fighters such as Ashwin Balrak, Stephan Nikiema and Ivan Hippolyte (their final match of three) and winning the I.K.B.O. world title in 1999 and the World Professional Kickboxing League (WPKL) and I.M.T.F. world titles in 2000. He would also suffer a few defeats, losing his second fight against Hippolyte in 1998 as well as failing to win the W.M.T.C. world title against Sakmongkol Sithchuchok in 1999 – Sakmongol's relentless kicks eventually breaking Ubeda’s arm in the fifth round of their bout.

In 2002 Ubeda won two more titles, defeating Turkish fighters Şahin Yakut and Yücel Fidan to win the World Kickboxing Association (W.K.A.)and World Full Contact Association (W.F.C.A.) world titles. The W.F.C.A. title would be the last honour that Ubeda would claim, as years of damage from low kicks had taken their toll on his shins and meant that he would only be able to fight using full-contact style kickboxing from then on. In 2003 he met Rayen Simson in the first of their two matches at what would be his only K-1 appearance, winning by unanimous decision at the K-1 Holland Grand Prix 2003.

As a purely full-contact fighter, Ubeda would continue to win titles, winning the W.F.C.A. kickboxing world title in 2003. Later that year he entered the 8-man "Nuit des Champions" tournament, held annually in Marseilles, France where he made the final. In 2005 he retained his W.F.C.A. kickboxing world title before dropping down in weight to re-match Rayen Simson at the end of the year. He won their title fight in Nijmegen to add the 72.5 kg W.F.C.A. belt to his collection. Not one to be known to turn down a challenge, he also entered pro boxing and had reasonable success, winning the Pro Boxing Brill Ben Carré Amsterdam Cup. He had his last kickboxing bout against good friend Şahin Yakut at It's Showtime 2009 Amsterdam, losing by unanimous decision.

== Titles ==
- 2008 Pro Boxing Brill Ben Carré Amsterdam Cup
- 2005 W.F.C.A. Kickboxing World Champion -72.5 kg
- 2005 W.F.C.A. Kickboxing World Champion -76.2 kg
- 2003 W.F.C.A. Full-contact World Champion -76.2 kg
- 2002 W.F.C.A. Thaiboxing World Champion -76.2 kg
- 2002 W.K.A. Full-contact World Champion -76.2 kg
- 2000 I.M.T.F. Muay Thai World Champion -75 kg
- 2000 WPKL Thaiboxing World Champion -76.2 kg
- 1999 I.K.B.O. Kickboxing World Champion -76.2 kg
- 1996 [W.K.A. Kickboxing Dutch National Champion
- 1996 I.T.F. All Japan Open Taekwondo Championship Winner -90 kg
- 1996 I.K.B.F. Full-contact World Champion -76.2 kg
- 1995 W.M.T.A. Thaiboxing World Champion -76.2 kg
- 1993 I.K.B.F. Full-contact European Champion -79.38 kg
- 1992 W.M.T.A. Thaiboxing European Champion -76.2 kg

== Kickboxing record ==
Kickboxing Record
78 Wins (38 (T)KOs), 20 Losses, 2 Draws, 1 No Contest
Date	Result	Opponent	Event	Location	Method	Round	Time
2009-05-16	Loss	(Turkey) Şahin Yakut	It's Showtime 2009 Amsterdam	Amsterdam, Netherlands	Decision (Unanimous)	3	3:00
2008-11-29	Loss	(Turkey) Murat Direkçi	It's Showtime 2008 Eindhoven	Eindhoven, Netherlands	Decision (Unanimous)	3	3:00
2008-07-06	Win	(Portugal) José Reis	Ultimate Glory 8	Nijmegen, Netherlands	Decision	5	2:00
2008-04-26	Win	(Netherlands) Stephen Tapilatu	K-1 World Grand Prix 2008 in Amsterdam	Amsterdam, Netherlands	KO	5	
2007-12-02	Win	(Morocco) Youssef Akhnikh	Time for Action	Nijmegen, Netherlands	Decision	5	3:00
2006-10-08	Win	(Iran) Sepehr Zarrin	Battle of Arnhem V	Arnhem, Netherlands	TKO (Corner Stoppage)	1	
2005-11-13	Win	(Suriname) Rayen Simson	Time for Action	Nijmegen, Netherlands	Decision	12	2:00
Wins W.F.C.A. Full Contact World title -72.5 kg.
2005-10-02	Win	(France) Younis Tabti	Battle of Arnhem IV	Arnhem, Netherlands	KO	4	
2005-04-30	Win	(Spain) Juanjo Alvarez	W.F.C.A. - Super Gala Battle to Victory	Alicante, Spain	TKO (Doctor Stoppage)	5	2:00
Retains W.F.C.A. Full Contact World title -76.2 kg.
2005-03-20	Win	(Spain) Carlos Heredia		Barcelona, Spain	Decision	7	2:00
2003-11-15	Loss	(France) Olivier Cerdan	10th "Nuit des Champions", Final	Marseilles, France			
Fight was for "Nuit des Champions" Full-contact 8-man tournament.
2003-11-15	Win	(France) Christophe Landais	10th "Nuit des Champions", Semi Finals	Marseilles, France			
2003-11-15	Win	(France) Christophe Tendil	10th "Nuit des Champions", Quarter Finals	Marseilles, France			
2003-09-14	Win	(Spain) Juanjo Alvarez	Gala in Druten	Druten, Netherlands	KO	2	
Wins W.F.C.A. Full Contact World title -76.2 kg.
2003-06-08	Loss	(Netherlands) Joerie Mes	It's Showtime 2003 Amsterdam	Amsterdam, Netherlands	Decision (Unanimous)	5	3:00
2003-04-06	Win	(Suriname) Rayen Simson	K-1 Holland Grand Prix 2003	Zoetermeer, Netherlands	Decision (Unanimous)	3	3:00
2003-02-15	Loss	(Netherlands) Joerie Mes	Xena Sports "Heaven or Hell 8"	Netherlands	Decision (Unanimous)	5	3:00
2002-11-29	NC	(Morocco) Najim Ethoullali	W.P.K.L. Muay Thai Champions League VIII	Rotterdam, Netherlands	No Contest (Shin Injury)	1	3:00
2002-09-08	Win	(Turkey) Yücel Fidan	Fighting Party	Rotterdam, Netherlands	KO		
Wins W.F.C.A. Thaiboxing World title -76.2 kg.
2002-02-24	Win	(Turkey) Şahin Yakut	K-1 World Grand Prix 2002 Preliminary Netherlands	Arnhem, Netherlands	Decision (Unanimous)	12	2:00
Wins W.K.A. Full Contact Middleweight World title.
2001-05-20	Win	(Turkey) Yavuz Özden	K-1 World Grand Prix 2001 Preliminary Germany	Oberhausen, Germany	KO	6	
2000-12-12	Win	(Germany) Kamel El Amrani	It's Showtime - Christmas Edition	Haarlem, Netherlands	Decision (Unanimous)	5	3:00
2000-10-22	Win	(Belarus) Vitali Akhramenko	It's Showtime - Exclusive	Haarlem, Netherlands	Decision (Unanimous)	5	3:00
2000-09-03	Win	(Thailand) Nuengtrakarn Por Muang Ubon	Battle of Arnhem 2 (BOA2) - Rijnhal Arnhem	Arnhem, Netherlands	Decision (Unanimous)	5	3:00
Wins I.M.T.F. Muay Thai World title -75 kg.
2000-06-04	Loss	(Suriname) Ashwin Balrak	The Night of Revenge	Haarlem, Netherlands	Decision (Unanimous)	5	3:00
2000-03-18	Loss	(Thailand) Sakmongkol Sithchuchok	I.S.K.A. Kickboxing	Las Vegas, Nevada, USA	Disqualification (Illegal Elbow)	1	
2000-01-23	Win	(Morocco) Hassan Ettaki	Day of No Mercy	Rotterdam, Netherlands	KO	1	
Wins W.P.K.L. Muay Thai World title -76.2 kg.
1999-10-24	Draw	(Suriname) Orlando Wiet	It's Showtime - It's Showtime	Haarlem, Netherlands	Decision Draw	5	3:00
1999-09-05	Win	(Netherlands) Ivan Hippolyte	Battle of Arnhem I	Arnhem, Netherlands	TKO (Shin Injury)	1	
1999-12-05	Loss	(Thailand) Sakmongkol Sithchuchok	Kings Birthday 1999, Lumpinee Stadium	Bangkok, Thailand	TKO (Left body kick)	5	0:22
Fight was for the W.M.T.C. Muay Thai World title -72.5 kg.
1999-03-14	Win	(Turkey) Yavuz Özden		Veenendaal, Netherlands	KO (Back Kick)	3	
Wins I.K.B.O. Kickboxing World title -76.2 kg.
1999-02-27	Win	(France) Stephan Nikiema	Muaythai Gala in Palais des Sports	Marseilles, France	TKO (Referee Stoppage)	4	
1998-09-26	Win	(Netherlands) Peter Kley	The Fight of the Champions	Amsterdam, Netherlands	KO	1	
1998-05-31	Loss	(Netherlands) Ivan Hippolyte	Fight of the Decade	Amsterdam, Netherlands	Decision	5	3:00
1998-03-14	Win	(Thailand) Vicharn Chor Rochanachai	MAJKF "Saikyou he no Battle'	Tokyo, Japan	Decision	5	3:00
1998-02-15	Win	(Suriname) Ashwin Balrak	Chakuriki vs The Netherlands	Nijmegen, Netherlands	KO (Roundhouse Kick)	1	
1997-06-07	Win	(France) Stephane Nikiema	K-1 Fight Night '97	Zürich, Switzerland	Decision (Unanimous)	5	3:00
1996-10-26	Win	(Netherlands) Rodney Faverus		Amsterdam, Netherlands	TKO	6	
Wins W.K.A. Dutch National Kickboxing title -76.2 kg.
1996-03-16	Win	(England) Donald Lindo	Thai/Kickboxing Nijmegen	Nijmegen, Netherlands	KO	1	
Wins I.K.B.F. Full-contact World title -76.2 kg.
1995-03-19	NC	(Albania) Azem Maksutaj		Nijmegen, Netherlands	No Contest	1	
1993-05-08	Win			Duisburg, Germany	KO	4	
Wins I.K.B.F. Full-contact European title -79.38 kg.
1992-12-05	Win			Clermont-Ferrand, France	KO		
Wins W.M.T.A. Thaiboxing European title -76.2 kg.
1992	Loss	(Thailand) Sadau Kiatsongrit		Thailand			
For the W.M.T.C. Muay Thai World title -75 kg.
1988	Loss	(Netherlands) Rob van Hetten		Breda, Netherlands	Decision	5	2:00
1986-11-01	Loss	(Netherlands) Andre Masseurs		Groesbeek, Netherlands	Decision	5	1:00
Fight was for Dutch Youth title under 16 (5x 1 min.).
Legend: Win Loss Draw/No contest Notes

Taekwondo record
Date	Result	Opponent	Event	Location	Method	Round	Time
1996-05-12	Win	(Japan)	I.T.F. All Japan Open Taekwondo Championships, Final	Tokyo, Japan	KO	1
Wins I.T.F. All Japan Open Taekwondo Championships -90 kg.
1996-05-12	Win	(South Korea)	I.T.F. All Japan Open Taekwondo Championships, Semi Finals	Tokyo, Japan	KO	1
1996-10-26	Win	(Belarus) Denis Sharoykin	I.T.F. All Japan Open Taekwondo Championships, Quarter Finals	Tokyo, Japan	KO	1

Legend: Win Loss Draw/No contest Notes

== Boxing record ==
Boxing Record
3 Wins (1 (T)KOs)
Date	Result	Opponent	Event	Location	Method	Round	Time
2008-10-13	Win	(Netherlands) Steve de Veth	Brill Ben Carré Amsterdam Cup, Final	Amsterdam, Netherlands	Decision (Unanimous)	4	3:00
Wins 2008 Pro Boxing Brill Ben Carré Amsterdam Cup -71 kg.
2008-10-13	Win	(Netherlands) Melvin Rozenblad	Brill Ben Carré Amsterdam Cup, Semi Finals	Amsterdam, Netherlands	TKO	3	
2007-10-08	Win	(Armenia) Karen Karapetyan		Amsterdam, Netherlands	Decision (Split)	6	3:00
Legend: Win Loss Draw/No contest Notes

== Mixed martial arts record ==
Res.	Record	Opponent	Method	Event	Date	Round	Time	Location	Notes
Loss	0-2	(Turkey) Metin Yakut	Submission	It's Showtime Boxing & MMA Event 2005 Amsterdam	June 12, 2005	1		Amsterdam, Netherlands	
Loss	0-1	(Belarus) Dennis Sharoykin	Submission (choke)	It's Showtime 2004 Amsterdam	May 20, 2004	2		Amsterdam, Netherlands	

== See also ==
- List of male kickboxers
- List of K-1 events
