= Murat Direkçi =

Belgian-Turkish middleweight kickboxer

Murat Direkci
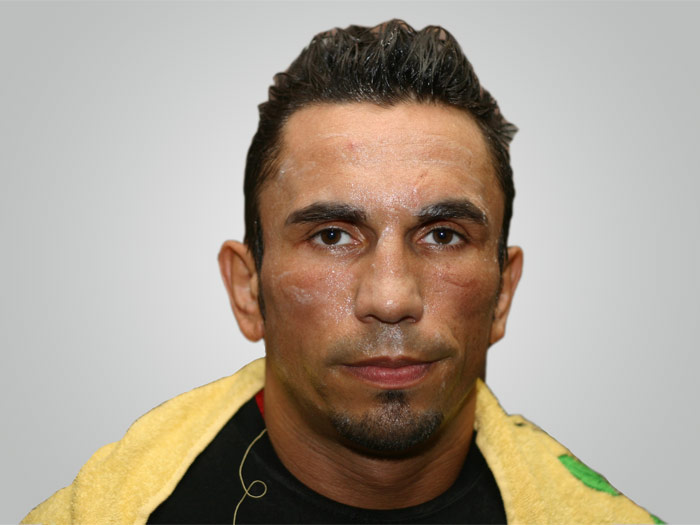
- Born: Murat Direkci; July 17, 1979 (age 47); Antwerp, Belgium
- Nationality: Belgian; Turkish
- Height: 1.75 m (5 ft 9 in)
- Weight: 77 kg (170 lb; 12.1 st)
- Division: Middleweight, Super Middleweight
- Style: Kickboxing, Muay Thai
- Team: Universal Gym

Kickboxing record
- Total: 88
- Wins: 69
- By knockout: 57
- Losses: 17
- By knockout: 4
- Draws: 2
- Last updated on: September 27, 2020

Murat Direkci (born 17 July 1979 in Antwerp, Belgium) is a Belgian-Turkish middleweight kickboxer, fighting out of Universal Gym, Antwerp, Belgium.

== Early life ==
Direkci was born in Antwerp, Belgium as the youngest son of three siblings to a family originally from Konya, Derebucak, Turkey. His sister Nuray died at the age of 4 due to a brain tumor, and his brother Ercan died in 2004 as a result of a traffic accident at 29. After completing his school education, Direkci studied at technical school with the intention of becoming an electrician. After a short while, he found a job as a doorman at a nightclub in Antwerp, however, and took up this career.

== Career ==
Direkci began training in martial arts at the age of 15 and was originally trained by Jan Gooyvaers. In 1999, he began training under Jan Pasztjerik.

After becoming the Belgian, European and World champion in kickboxing and muay Thai, he made his K-1 debut against Fikri Tijarti at the K-1 World Grand Prix 2006 in Amsterdam in May 2006, winning by technical knockout in round 3. In February the following year, he faced former K-1 world champion Albert Kraus at the K-1 World MAX 2007 Japan Tournament in Tokyo and shocked the world by knocking Kraus out in the first round. After winning two more fights in K-1, over Joerie Mes and Satoruvaschicoba, he took part in the final 16 of the 2008 K-1 World MAX at K-1 World MAX 2008 World Championship Tournament Final 16 in April 2008 but lost to Yoshihiro Sato via decision.

On February 8, 2009, he became the It's Showtime 70MAX Champion by defeating Gago Drago via technical knockout at Fights at the Border presents: It's Showtime 2009 in his hometown of Antwerp. He made his first defence of the title against Morocco's Chahid Oulad El Hadj at It's Showtime 2009 Lommel in October 2009, before losing it to Congolese Muay Thai fighter Chris Ngimbi at Yiannis Evgenikos presents: It's Showtime Athens in December 2010.

Direkci lost a decision to Robin van Roosmalen at It's Showtime 2012 in Leeuwarden on January 28, 2012. Following the fight, he announced his retirement.

He would then come out of retirement, however, to face Nieky Holzken at Glory 2: Brussels on October 6, 2012 in Brussels, Belgium. He apparently decided that he will no longer cut weight for his fights and will fight Holzken at 78 kg as opposed to his usual division of 70 kg. He lost via TKO due to a cut in the second round.

He lost to Canadian prospect Joseph Valtellini via TKO due to corner stoppage in round two at Glory 6: Istanbul in Istanbul, Turkey on April 6, 2013.

In July 2019, Enfusion announced Murat would return after a six year hiatus. Two weeks later, they announced Hafid El Boustati as his opponent. The two of them met during Enfusion 90, with El Boustati winning a split decision.

== Titles ==
- 2009–10 It's Showtime 70MAX Champion (1 title defence)
- 2003 World Full Contact Association (W.F.C.A.) Thai-Boxing World Champion -70 kg
- 2003 Kick-Boxing European Champion
- Belgium Champion (7 times)

== Kickboxing record ==
Kickboxing record
68 wins (57 (T)KOs, 11 decisions), 17 losses, 2 draws
| Date | Result | Opponent | Event | Location | Method | Round | Time |
| 2019-11-02 | Loss | (Morocco) Hafid El Boustati | Enfusion Live 90 | Antwerp, Belgium | Decision (unanimous) | 3 | 3:00 |
| 2013-04-06 | Loss | (Canada) Joseph Valtellini | Glory 6: Istanbul | Istanbul, Turkey | TKO (corner stoppage) | 2 | |
| 2012-10-06 | Loss | (Netherlands) Nieky Holzken | Glory 2: Brussels | Brussels, Belgium | TKO (cut) | 2 | |
| 2012-01-28 | Loss | (Netherlands) Robin van Roosmalen | It's Showtime 2012 in Leeuwarden | Amsterdam, Netherlands | Decision (majority) | 3 | 3:00 |
| 2011-09-24 | Loss | (Democratic Republic of the Congo) Chris Ngimbi | BFN Group & Music Hall presents: It's Showtime "Fast & Furious 70MAX", Quarter Finals | Brussels, Belgium | Decision (unanimous) | 3 | 3:00 |
| 2010-12-11 | Loss | (Democratic Republic of the Congo) Chris Ngimbi | Yiannis Evgenikos presents: It's Showtime Athens | Athens, Greece | Decision (5-0) | 5 | 3:00 |
Loses his It's Showtime 70MAX Championship.
| 2010-10-10 | Win | (Germany) Enriko Kehl | Mix Fight Gala 10 | Darmstadt, Germany | TKO | 1 | 2:37 |
| 2010-05-29 | Loss | (Ukraine) Artur Kyshenko | It's Showtime 2010 Amsterdam | Amsterdam, Netherlands | Decision (4-1) | 3 | 3:00 |
| 2009-11-21 | Win | (Netherlands) William Diender | It's Showtime 2009 Barneveld | Barneveld, Netherlands | Decision (unanimous) | 3 | 3:00 |
| 2009-10-24 | Win | (Morocco) Chahid Oulad El Hadj | It's Showtime 2009 Lommel | Lommel, Belgium | TKO (doctor stoppage, cut) | 1 | |
Retains It's Showtime 70MAX Championship.
| 2009-05-16 | Win | (Netherlands) Brian Lo-A-Njoe | It's Showtime 2009 Amsterdam | Amsterdam, Netherlands | TKO (referee stoppage) | 2 | N/A |
| 2009-02-08 | Win | (Armenia) Gago Drago | Fights at the Border presents: It's Showtime 2009 | Antwerp, Belgium | TKO (referee stoppage) | 1 | 2:23 |
Wins inaugural It's Showtime 70MAX Championship.
| 2008-11-29 | Win | (Netherlands) Perry Ubeda | It's Showtime 2008 Eindhoven | Eindhoven, Netherlands | Decision (unanimous) | 3 | 3:00 |
| 2008-10-05 | Loss | (Morocco) Tarik El Idrissi | Tough Is Not Enough | Rotterdam, Netherlands | TKO (doctor stoppage) | 2 | |
Fight was for W.I.P.U. "King of the Ring" K-1 Rules super welterweight title -70 kg.
| 2008-05-24 | Loss | (Morocco) Chahid Oulad El Hadj | Gentleman Promotions Fightnight | Tilburg, Netherlands | TKO (referee stoppage) | 3 | |
| 2008-04-09 | Loss | (Japan) Yoshihiro Sato | K-1 World MAX 2008 Final 16 | Hiroshima, Japan | Decision (unanimous) | 3 | 3:00 |
Fails to qualify for K-1 World MAX 2008 Final 8.
| 2008-03-15 | Draw | (Morocco) Faldir Chahbari | It's Showtime 75MAX Trophy Final 2008, Super Fight | 's-Hertogenbosch, Netherlands | Decision draw | 3 | 3:00 |
| 2007-10-03 | Win | (Japan) Satoruvashicoba | K-1 World MAX 2007 Final, Reserve Fight | Tokyo, Japan | KO (left hook) | 2 | 0:39 |
| 2007-06-23 | Win | (Netherlands) Joerie Mes | K-1 World Grand Prix 2007 in Amsterdam | Amsterdam, Netherlands | TKO (doctor stoppage) | 1 | 1:40 |
| 2007-03-24 | Draw | (Morocco) Salah Edine Ait Naceur | It's Showtime Trophy 2007, Super Fight | Lommel, Belgium | Decision draw | 3 | 3:00 |
| 2007-02-05 | Win | (Netherlands) Albert Kraus | K-1 World MAX 2007 Japan Tournament | Tokyo, Japan | KO (left hook) | 1 | 1:27 |
| 2006-11-12 | Win | (Netherlands) Ray Staring | 2H2H Ahoy | Rotterdam, Netherlands | TKO (doctor stoppage) | | |
| 2006-05-13 | Win | (Morocco) Fikri Tijarti | K-1 World Grand Prix 2006 in Amsterdam | Amsterdam, Netherlands | TKO (referee stoppage) | 3 | 2:10 |
| 2006-02-03 | Win | (Morocco) Abdil Boukari | WFCA Gala | Roosendaal, Netherlands | Decision | 5 | 3:00 |
| 2005-11-13 | Loss | (Morocco) Faldir Chahbari | WFCA Thai-Kickbox Gala | Nijmegen, Netherlands | Decision (unanimous) | 5 | 3:00 |
Fight was for W.F.C.A. Thai-boxing junior middleweight European title -69.85 kg.
| 2005-09-25 | Win | (Hungary) Roland Vörös | Thaiboxing Gala, Arenahal | Deurne, Belgium | TKO | 2 | |
| 2005-06-12 | Loss | (Armenia) Gago Drago | It's Showtime 2005 Amsterdam | Amsterdam, Netherlands | Decision (unanimous) | 5 | 3:00 |
| 2005-04-30 | Win | (Netherlands) Melvin Rozenblad | Queens Fight Night | Eindhoven, Netherlands | KO | | |
| 2004-02-28 | Win | (Hungary) Janos Szenasi | Thaiboxing Gala | Mons, Belgium | Decision (unanimous) | 5 | 3:00 |
| 2004-01-12 | Win | (Belgium) Nadir Larecht | Fights at the Border III | Lommel, Belgium | KO | 1 | |
| 2003-10-18 | Win | (England) Anthony Bassnett | Gala in Deurne | Deurne, Belgium | TKO | 3 | |
Wins W.F.C.A. Thai-Boxing World title -70kg.
Legend: Win Loss Draw/no contest Notes

== See also ==
- List of K-1 events
- List of It's Showtime champions
- List of male kickboxers
- List of male mixed martial artists
