= Joerie Mes =

Dutch martial artist

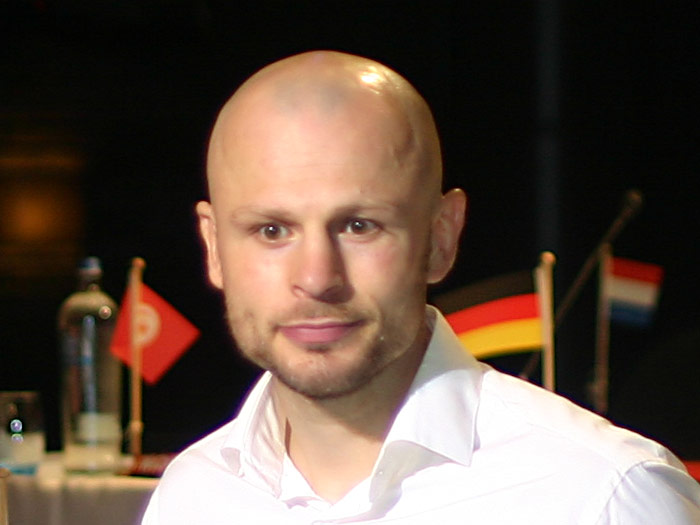
- Born: March 16, 1979 (age 47); Amsterdam, Netherlands
- Other names: The Shark
- Height: 1.77 m (5 ft 10 in)
- Weight: 74 kg (163 lb; 11.7 st)
- Division: Welterweight
- Style: Muay Thai
- Fighting out of: Amsterdam, Netherlands
- Team: Mike's Gym (2005–2009); Gym Alkmaar (–2005)
- Trainer: Mike Passenier; Edwin van Os
- Years active: 1996–2009

Kickboxing record
- Total: 66
- Wins: 50
- By knockout: 29
- Losses: 12
- By knockout: 5
- Draws: 4
- Last updated on: July 14, 2009

Joerie "The Shark" Mes (born March 16, 1979) is a Dutch former kickboxer, fighting out of Mike's Gym in Amsterdam. He is a former Dutch and European Muay Thai champion who later competed in K-1 MAX. He is widely regarded as one of the greatest combination specialists in kickboxing history. After his kickboxing career he worked as a history teacher in Amsterdam for several years. He is now a full-time kickboxing coach at Mike's Gym.

== Biography and career ==
Mes grew up in Amsterdam (Amsterdam Noord). As a kid, he excelled in field hockey, as a goalie. As he felt field hockey was not for him, he tried soccer for a short while, before he got involved in kickboxing. At the age of fifteen, he started training with coach Mike Passenier.

== Titles ==
- 2005 It's Showtime 75MAX Trophy Tilburg Pool A winner
- WMTO European champion
- IPMTF Dutch (79 kg) champion
- 2000 MTBN Dutch (76 kg) champion

== Kickboxing record ==
Kickboxing record
50 wins (29 (T)KOs, 21 decisions), 12 losses, 4 draws
Date	Result	Opponent	Event	Location	Method	Round	Time
2009-07-13	Loss	(Japan) Yoshihiro Sato	K-1 World MAX 2009 Final 8, Reserve Fight	Tokyo, Japan	Ext R. decision (split)	4	3:00
2009-06-13	Win	(Morocco) Mohammed Medhar	Gentleman Promotions	Tilburg, Netherlands	Decision (unanimous)	3	3:00
2009-05-16	Win	(Canada) Shane Campbell	It's Showtime 2009 Amsterdam	Amsterdam, Netherlands	TKO (referee stoppage)	3	
2009-02-09	Win	(Belgium) Jan van Denderen	Fights at the Border presents: It's Showtime 2009	Antwerp, Belgium	Decision (unanimous)	3	3:00
2008-11-29	Win	(Democratic Republic of the Congo) Chris Ngimbi	It's Showtime 2008 Eindhoven	Eindhoven, Netherlands	KO (left hook)	2	2:08
2008-10-01	Win	(Japan) Takayuki Kohiruimaki	K-1 World MAX 2008 Final	Tokyo, Japan	KO (left hook)	3	2:59
2008-04-26	Loss	(Netherlands) Nieky Holzken	K-1 World GP 2008 in Amsterdam	Amsterdam, Netherlands	KO (spinning back kick)	2	2:21
2008-03-08	Loss	(Belgium) Kenneth van Eesvelde	Fights at the Border 6	Lommel, Belgium	TKO (doctor stoppage)	3	
2008-02-17	Loss	(Suriname) Marco Pique	K-1 MAX Netherlands 2008	Utrecht, Netherlands	Decision (ext. R)	4	3:00
2007-09-23	Win	(Suriname) Imro Main	Rings "Risky Business"	Utrecht, Netherlands	Decision (unanimous)	5	3:00
2007-06-23	Loss	(Turkey) Murat Direkci	K-1 World Grand Prix 2007 in Amsterdam	Amsterdam, Netherlands	TKO (doctor stoppage/cut)	1	1:40
2007-05-06	Loss	(Netherlands) Andy Souwer	SLAMM "Nederland vs Thailand III"	Haarlem, Netherlands	Decision (unanimous)	3	3:00
2007-03-24	Win	(Belgium) Jan de Keyzer	It's Showtime Trophy 2007	Lommel, Belgium	KO (left hook)	1	1:03
Qualifies for It's Showtime 75MAX Trophy 2008 but later withdraws due to dropping down in weight to -70 kg.
2006-11-12	Loss	(Suriname) Tyrone Spong	Pride & Honor Ahoy 2006	Rotterdam, Netherlands	TKO (knee strike)	5	1:12
2006-09-23	Loss	(Czech Republic) Ondrej Hutnik	It's Showtime 75MAX Trophy Final 2006, Semi Finals	Rotterdam, Netherlands	Decision	3	3:00
2006-09-23	Win	(Croatia) Emil Zoraj	It's Showtime 75MAX Trophy Final 2006, Quarter Finals	Rotterdam, Netherlands	Decision	3	3:00
2006-05-13	Win	(Netherlands) Ramon Dekkers	K-1 World Grand Prix 2006 in Amsterdam	Amsterdam, Netherlands	Decision (unanimous)	3	3:00
2006-02-12	Win	(Netherlands) Ruben van den Giesen	Muay Thai Gala in Amsterdam	Amsterdam, Netherlands	Decision (unanimous)	5	3:00
2005-10-02	Win	(Turkey) Yücel Fidan	It's Showtime 75MAX Trophy, 1st Round - Tilburg, Pool A Final	Tilburg, Netherlands	Decision (unanimous)	3	3:00
Qualifies for It's Showtime 75MAX Trophy Final 2006.
2005-10-02	Win	(Curaçao) Cedric Copra	It's Showtime 75MAX Trophy, 1st Round - Tilburg, Pool A Semi Finals	Tilburg, Netherlands	TKO (referee stoppage)	1	0:40
2005-06-12	Win	(Suriname) Rayen Simson	It's Showtime 2005 Amsterdam	Amsterdam, Netherlands	Decision (unanimous)	5	3:00
2005-02-13	Win	(Netherlands) Sem Braan	Muaythai in de Hoornse Vaart	Alkmaar, Netherlands	Decision (unanimous)	5	3:00
2004-12-18	Win	(Brazil) Moises Baptista De Sousa	SuperLeague Netherlands 2004	Uden, Netherlands	KO (left hook)	1	
2004-10-10	Win	(Netherlands) Vincent Vielvoye	2Hot2Handle 17	Rotterdam, Netherlands	TKO		
2004-05-20	Loss	(Thailand) Pajonsuk	It's Showtime 2004 Amsterdam	Amsterdam, Netherlands	Decision	5	3:00
2004-03-20	Win	(Hungary) Attila Nagy	SuperLeague Italy 2004	Padua, Italy	Decision (unanimous)	5	3:00
2003-12-06	Loss	(Belarus) Dmitry Shakuta	SuperLeague Netherlands 2003	Rotterdam, Netherlands	KO (right high kick)	2	2:19
2003-09-27	Win	(Italy) Roberto Cocco	SuperLeague Germany 2003	Wuppertal, Germany	KO	4	
2003-06-08	Win	(Netherlands) Perry Ubeda	It's Showtime 2003 Amsterdam	Amsterdam, Netherlands	Decision (unanimous)	5	3:00
2003-04-28	Win	(Czech Republic) Jindrich Velecky	Tulp Muay Thai Gala	Amsterdam, Netherlands	TKO	4	
2003-03-16	Win	(Suriname) Rayen Simson	Victory or Hell	Amsterdam, Netherlands	Decision (unanimous)	5	3:00
2003-02-15	Win	(Netherlands) Perry Ubeda	Xena Sports "Heaven or Hell 8"	Netherlands	Decision (unanimous)	5	3:00
2002-11-24	Win	(Morocco) Khalid Hanine	Xena Sports Victory Or Hell	Amsterdam, Netherlands	KO (high kick)	1	
2002-09-29	Win	(Suriname) Rayen Simson	It's Showtime – As Usual / Battle Time	Haarlem, Netherlands	TKO (corner stoppage)	4	
2002-04-27	Loss	(Turkey) Şahin Yakut	Gala in Schremerhorn	Schermerhorn, Netherlands	Decision	3	3:00
2002-02-12	Win	(Netherlands) Donald Berner	WPKL Thaiboks Gala	Amsterdam, Netherlands	Decision	5	3:00
2001-10-21	Win	(Morocco) Habib Ben-Salah	It's Showtime - Original	Haarlem, Netherlands	TKO (corner stoppage)	4	3:00
2001-04-22	Win	(Morocco) Fouad Tijarti	Veni, Vidi, Vici	Veenendaal, Netherlands	Decision	5	3:00
2000-12-12	Win	(Netherlands) Gerbrand Takens	It's Showtime - Christmas Edition	Haarlem, Netherlands	KO (left body shot)	3	1:30
2000-10-22	Win	(Turkey) Şahin Yakut	It's Showtime - Exclusive	Haarlem, Netherlands	Decision (unanimous)	5	3:00
2000-05-20	Win	(Netherlands) Tommy Walraven	Thaiboxing -Thrill of the Year	Amsterdam, Netherlands	Decision (unanimous)	5	3:00
Wins M.T.B.N. Dutch title -76kg.
Legend: Win Loss Draw/no contest Notes

== See also ==
- List of K-1 events
- List of It's Showtime events
- List of It's Showtime champions
- List of male kickboxers
