= Rayen Simson =

Surinamese-Dutch super middleweight Muay Thai kickboxer

- Born: May 22, 1972 (age 54); Paramaribo, Suriname
- Other names: Red Bean, Tru Bala
- Height: 1.81 m (5 ft 11 1/2 in)
- Weight: 76 kg (168 lb; 12.0 st)
- Division: Super Middleweight
- Style: Kickboxing, Muay Thai
- Stance: Orthodox
- Fighting out of: Amsterdam, Netherlands
- Team: Gym Van De Vathorst
- Trainer: Rick van de Vathorst
- Years active: 1993–2010

Kickboxing record
- Total: 123
- Wins: 102
- By knockout: 34
- Losses: 19
- By knockout: 4
- Draws: 1
- No contests: 1
- Last updated on: September 22, 2010

Rayen "Red Bean" Simson (born May 22, 1972) is a Surinamese-Dutch former Muay Thai kickboxer. He won seven world titles in three different organizations and was ranked number 2 at the Lumpinee Stadium - a notoriously difficult achievement for a farang fighter. He has also won a European title, two Dutch titles, and tournaments in Shoot Boxing and K-1 MAX. He has amassed over 100 wins and holds notable victories over fighters such as Ramon Dekkers, Ashwin Balrak and Faldir Chahbari. He had his last fight in 2010.

== Biography and career ==
Rayen Simson entered his first major tournament in 1995 where he competed in the inaugural Shoot Boxing World Tournament 1995 in Osaka, Japan, along with eight other fighters from across the world. The young Simson was unable to make much of an impact at the event, losing in the quarter-final stage after a tough five round battle with Thai Bovi Chorwaikan. He returned to Europe where he won the W.P.K.L. European title and went on an impressive winning streak, culminating in a victory over the legendary Ramon Dekkers in a memorable match in Roosendaal in 1997. Simson recovered from two knockdowns (one the famous double knockdown) to defeat Dekkers by technical knockout at the end of the second round.

His confidence high Simon headed back to Japan to participate in the Shoot Boxing World Tournament 1997, which he had qualified for by beating the ’95 finalist Roni Lewis the previous year. Simson defeated ’95 champion Hiromu Yoshitaka in the semi-finals before defeating Mohamed Ouali in the final by unanimous decision to claim his first major title. Over the next few years he would win a number of fights before defeating Najim Ettouhlali in 1997 for the W.P.K.L European title and Hassan Ettaki in 1998 for the W.P.K.L. World title. In 1999 Simson faced multiple Muay Thai world champion and living legend Ivan Hippolyte in the first of their two fights, inflicting a rare defeat on Hippolyte after five gruelling rounds. The two fighters would meet again the next year in a rematch in what would be Hippolyte's last ever match. This time Simson was unable to defeat Hippolyte, being knocked down in the third before withdrawing from the fight in the fourth due to a leg injury.

Simson would go back to winning ways at the start of the millennium, between 2000 and 2002 he won the Dutch national Muay Thai title, the I.K.B.O World title and the 72.6 kg version of his W.P.K.L World title against Ashwin Balrak. Towards the end of 2002 he faced Joerie Mes in Haarlem, Netherlands. Simson lost by technical knockout after being outworked by the relentless Mes over four rounds. This match would spark the beginning of a fierce rivalry between the two men – they would fight two more times, with Mes being something of a nemesis to Simson, winning all three times. In 2003 he would win the World Kickboxing Network (W.K.N.) World title in his native Suriname before making his K-1 debut at the K-1 Holland Grand Prix 2003, losing by decision to Perry Ubeda. He would meet Ubeda several years later in 2005 in a losing bid for the World Full Contact Association (W.F.C.A.) 72.5 kg title.

In 2006 Simson would return to K-1 at the K-1 MAX Netherlands 2006 eight man tournament where the prize for winning was a reserve fight at the forthcoming K-1 MAX World Final. Simson booked his flight to Tokyo by defeating Faldir Chahbari in the final by extra round decision. He faced Artur Kyshenko at the K-1 World MAX 2006 Final but lost by third round majority decision, although the result would not mean overmuch as no injuries occurred during the final. At the end of the year and after a nine-year absence, Simson was invited back to the S-Cup to take part in another reserve fight at the Shoot Boxing World Tournament 2006. The ’97 S-Cup winner won his bout against Koichi Kikuchi but would not have the chance to proceed as there were no injuries. This event would be his last major international tournament.

Between 2006 and 2009 Simson would enter several small tournaments in Europe, winning the TaoThai "Cosa Nostra" Kombat League in Italy. By this point, despite the odd victory, age was taking its toll and his career was winding to a close. In 2009 he faced Eugene Ekkelboom in Montego Bay, Jamaica for Eugune’s W.M.C. Super Middleweight World title in what would be Simson's last title fight. Simson lost the bout by technical knockout, suffering an arm injury at the start of the fourth. In 2010 he had his final match at It's Showtime 2010 Amsterdam against Şahin Yakut, who was a replacement for his initial opponent Khalid Bourdif, who Simson had handpicked for his retirement match. Simson was unable to finish his career with a win, battling valiantly but ultimately losing by unanimous decision.

== Titles ==
- 2007 Kombat League Champion
- 2006 K-1 MAX Netherlands 2006 The Road to Tokyo Champion
- 2005 Rings Fight Gala Muaythai tournament champion -72.5 kg
- 2003 W.K.N. World Champion -76.2 kg
- 2002 W.P.K.L. World Champion -76.2 kg
- 2001 I.K.B.O. World Champion
- 2000 M.T.B.N. Dutch Champion
- 1998 W.P.K.L. World Champion -72 kg
- 1997 W.P.K.L. European Champion -72 kg
- 1997 Shoot Boxing World Tournament 1997 Champion
- 1995 W.P.K.L. European Champion
- Ranked Number 2 at Lumpinee Stadium

== Kickboxing record ==
Kickboxing record
102 wins (34 (T)KOs), 19 losses, 1 draw, 1 no contest
Date	Result	Opponent	Event	Location	Method	Round	Time
2010-05-29	Loss	(Turkey) Şahin Yakut	It's Showtime 2010 Amsterdam	Amsterdam, Netherlands	Decision (5-0)	3	3:00
2009-06-26	Loss	(Australia) Eugene Ekkelboom	Champions of Champions 2	Montego Bay, Jamaica	TKO (arm injury)	4	0:14
Fight was for Ekkelboom's W.M.C. Super Middleweight World title.
2008-11-30	Win	(Thailand) Lamsongkram Chuwattana	Slamm 5 "Nederland vs Thailand"	Almere, Netherlands	TKO (doctor stoppage)	2	
2007-08-31	Loss	(Portugal) José Reis	Steko's Fight Night 25, Semi-finals	Karlsruhe, Germany	Decision	3	3:00
2008-03-15	Loss	(Belarus) Dmitry Shakuta	It's Showtime 75MAX Trophy 2008, Quarter-finals	's-Hertogenbosch, Netherlands	Decision	3	3:00
2007-04-27	Win	(France) Eddy Saban	TaoThai "Cosa Nostra" Kombat League, Final	Taormina, Italy	TKO (referee stoppage, knee)	1	
Wins Kombat League 4-Man tournament -72.5kg.
2007-04-27	Win	(Italy) Matteo Sciacca	TaoThai "Cosa Nostra" Kombat League, Semi-finals	Taormina, Italy	TKO (referee stoppage, knee)	2	
2007-03-24	Win	(Turkey) Mesut Acikyol	It's Showtime Trophy 2007	Lommel, Belgium	Decision	3	3:00
Qualifies for It's Showtime 75MAX Trophy 2008.
2007-03-10	Loss	(Italy) Roberto Cocco	Steko's Fight Night 23, Final	Munich, Germany	Decision (unanimous)	3	3:00
Fight was for Kings of Kickboxing 2007 Munich preliminary tournament title -75kg. Fails to qualify for Kings of Kickboxing Final to be held later that year.
2007-03-10	Win	(Hungary) István Tóth	Steko's Fight Night 23, Semi-finals	Munich, Germany			
2007-04-27	Win	(France) Samir Dourid	Night of Pride	Paramaribo, Suriname	KO	3	
Retains W.K.N. Muay Thai World title -76.2 kg.
2006-12-09	Loss	(Morocco) Faldir Chahbari		Roosendaal, Netherlands	TKO (corner stoppage)	3	
2006-11-03	Win	(Japan) Koichi Kikuchi	S-Cup 2006, Reserve Fight	Tokyo, Japan	Decision (majority)	3	3:00
2006-06-30	Loss	(Ukraine) Artur Kyshenko	K-1 World MAX 2006 Final, Reserve Fight	Yokohama, Japan	Decision (majority)	3	3:00
2006-03-26	Win	(Morocco) Faldir Chahbari	K-1 MAX Netherlands 2006, Final	Utrecht, Netherlands	Ext.R decision	4	3:00
Wins K-1 MAX Netherlands 2006 and qualifies for a Reserve Fight at the K-1 World MAX 2006 Final.
2006-03-26	Win	(Netherlands) Ray Staring	K-1 MAX Netherlands 2006, Semi-finals	Utrecht, Netherlands	Decision	3	3:00
2006-03-26	Win	(Suriname) Junior Gonsalves	K-1 MAX Netherlands 2006, Quarter-finals	Utrecht, Netherlands	Decision	3	3:00
2005-12-11	Win	(Suriname) Imro Main	Rings Fight Gala, Final	Utrecht, Netherlands	Decision	3	3:00
Wins Rings Fight Gala Muaythai tournament -72.5 kg.
2005-12-11	Win	(Suriname) Junior Gonsalves	Rings Fight Gala, Semi-final	Utrecht, Netherlands	Decision	3	3:00
2005-11-13	Loss	(Netherlands) Perry Ubeda	Time for Action	Nijmegen, Netherlands	Decision	12	2:00
Fight was for vacant W.F.C.A. Full Contact World title -72.5 kg.
2005-10-29	Draw	(Japan) Toshio Matsumoto	No Kick, No Life	Tokyo, Japan	Decision draw	5	3:00
2005-10-02	Loss	(Croatia) Emil Zoraj	It's Showtime 75 MAX Trophy Tilburg Pool B Semi-finals	Tilburg, Netherlands	Decision (unanimous)	3	3:00
2005-06-12	Loss	(Netherlands) Joerie Mes	It's Showtime 2005 Amsterdam	Amsterdam, Netherlands	Decision (unanimous)	5	3:00
2005-04-03	Win	(Egypt) Amir Zeyada	Rings Muay Thai Gala	Netherlands	TKO (corner stoppage/towel)	5	
2005-02-19	Win	(Japan) Takaaki Nakamura	Rising Sun - Muay Thai Gala	Beilen, Netherlands	Disqualification	4	
2004-11-14	Win	(Thailand) Pajonsuk	Muay Thai/Mixed Fight Gala, Sporthal Stedenwijk	Almere, Netherlands	Decision	5	3:00
2004-05-20	Win	(Thailand) Leonard Sitpholek	It's Showtime 2004 Amsterdam	Amsterdam, Netherlands	Decision	5	3:00
2003-11-30	Loss	(Netherlands) Vincent Vielvoye	Killer Dome IV @ Bijlmer Sportcentrum	Amsterdam, Netherlands	Decision (unanimous)	5	3:00
2003-11-19	Win	(Belarus) Denis Sharoykin	Battle of Zaandam	Zaandam, Netherlands	Decision	5	3:00
2003-06-08	Win	(Morocco) Najim Ettouhlali	It's Showtime 2003 Amsterdam	Amsterdam, Netherlands	Decision	5	3:00
2003-04-06	Loss	(Netherlands) Perry Ubeda	K-1 Holland Grand Prix 2003	Zoetermeer, Netherlands	Decision (unanimous)	3	3:00
2003-03-16	Loss	(Netherlands) Joerie Mes	Victory or Hell	Amsterdam, Netherlands	Decision (unanimous)	5	3:00
2003	Win	(Belgium) Laurent Periquet		Paramaribo, Suriname	Decision	5	3:00
Wins W.K.N. Muay Thai World title -76.2 kg.
2002-11-29	NC	(Suriname) Ashwin Balrak	W.P.K.L. Muay Thai Champions League VIII	Rotterdam, Netherlands	No contest (shoulder injury)	1	
Fight was for Simson's W.P.K.L. Muay Thai World title -76.2 kg.
2002-09-29	Loss	(Netherlands) Joerie Mes	It's Showtime – As Usual / Battle Time	Haarlem, Netherlands	TKO (corner stoppage)	4	
2002-03-18	Win	(Suriname) Ashwin Balrak	2Hot2Handle "Simply the Best" 4	Rotterdam, Netherlands	Decision (unanimous)	5	3:00
Wins vacant W.P.K.L Muay Thai World title -76.2 kg.
2001-05-06	Win	(Tunisia) Riad Rekhis	Victory or Hell	Amsterdam, Netherlands	Decision	5	3:00
2001-03-18	Win	(Belarus) Sergei Karpin	2H2H - Simply The Best	Amsterdam, Netherlands	Decision	5	3:00
2000-10-22	Loss	(Netherlands) Ivan Hippolyte	It's Showtime - Exclusive	Netherlands	TKO (leg injury)	4	1:00
2000-09-03	Win	(Germany) Kamal El Amrani	Battle of Arnhem II	Arnhem, Netherlands	Decision	5	3:00
Wins I.K.B.O. World title.
2000-05-20	Win	(Netherlands) Peter Kley	Thaiboxing - Thrill of the Year	Amsterdam, Netherlands	Decision (unanimous)	5	3:00
Wins M.T.B.N. Dutch title.
1999-12-05	Loss	(Thailand) Yoddecha Sityodthong	King's Birthday	Bangkok, Thailand	Decision	5	3:00
1999-10-24	Win	(Netherlands) Ivan Hippolyte	It's Showtime - It's Showtime	Haarlem, Netherlands	Decision	5	3:00
1999-08-12	Loss	(Thailand) Sakmongkol Sithchuchok	Queen's Birthday Show	Nonthaburi, Thailand	Decision (unanimous)	5	3:00
1999-05-08	Win	(Thailand) Vihoknoi Chor. Malithong		Bangkok, Thailand	KO	3	
?	Win	(Thailand) Orono Por Muang Ubon		Thailand	Decision	5	3:00
1998-12-03	Win	(Morocco) Hassan Ettaki	Night of the Superstars	Amsterdam, Netherlands	Decision	5	3:00
Wins Ettaki's W.P.K.L Muay Thai World title -72 kg.
1998-11-14	Loss	(Thailand) Jomhod Kiatadisak	W.P.K.L. Muay Thai Champions League III, Semi-finals	Amsterdam, Netherlands	Decision	3	3:00
1998-05-23	Win	(Croatia) Stjepan Veselic	W.P.K.L. Muay Thai Champions League II, Quarter-finals	Roosendaal, Netherlands	KO	1	
Qualifies for W.P.K.L. Muay Thai Champions League III, Semi-finals.
1998-05-23	Win	(Germany) Kamal El Amrani	W.P.K.L. Muay Thai Champions League II, 1st round	Roosendaal, Netherlands	Decision	3	3:00
1998	Win	(Thailand) Payaklek Yutakit		Milan, Italy	Decision	5	3:00
1997-12-13	Win	(Morocco) Najim Ettouhlali	Thaiboxing Den Bosch	Den Bosch, Netherlands	Decision	5	3:00
Wins W.P.K.L Muay Thai European title -72 kg.
1997-11-10	Win	(Thailand) Nongmoon Chomphutong	The Night of the New Generation	Amsterdam, Netherlands	Decision	5	3:00
1997-06-01	Loss	(Morocco) Hassan Ettaki	Thaiboxing: Battle of Amsterdam	Amsterdam, Netherlands	TKO		
1997-05-09	Win	(Morocco) Mohamed Ouali	S-Cup 1997, Final	Tokyo, Japan	Decision (unanimous)	3	3:00
Wins Shoot Boxing World Tournament 1997.
1997-05-09	Win	(Japan) Hiromu Yoshitaka	S-Cup 1997, Semi-finals	Tokyo, Japan			
1997-04-20	Win	(Thailand) Dejpitak Sityodtong	The Night of No Mercy	Amsterdam, Netherlands	Decision	5	3:00
1997-03-23	Win	(Netherlands) Ramon Dekkers	Muay Thai Gala: The Night of War	Roosendaal, Netherlands	TKO (corner stoppage)	2	3:00
1996-10-07	Win	(Netherlands) Jon Vargas	Thaiboxing Imperium II	Rotterdam, Netherlands	KO	1	
1996-07-14	Win	(United States) Roni Lewis	S-Cup 1996	Tokyo, Japan	Decision (unanimous)	3	3:00
Qualifies for S-Cup 1997.
1995	Win	(England) Chris Allen		Netherlands			
Wins W.P.K.L Muay Thai European title.
1995-01-31	Loss	(Thailand) Bovi Chorwaikan	S-Cup 1995, Quarter-finals	Osaka, Japan	2nd ext.R decision (unanimous)	5	3:00
1993-11-26	Win	(Netherlands) Alwen Lobles	Thaiboxing gala, Houtrusthallen	The Hague, Netherlands	Decision	5	3:00
1993-07-08	Win	(Japan) Kiyotaka Kato	THE WARS’93	Tokyo, Japan	Decision (split)	5	3:00
1993-01-29	Win	(Belgium) Lodewijk Vercounteren	The Best of Best	Best, Netherlands	KO	2	
Legend: Win Loss Draw/no contest Notes

== See also ==
- List of male kickboxers
- List of K-1 events
