= Chris Ngimbi =

Dutch martial artist

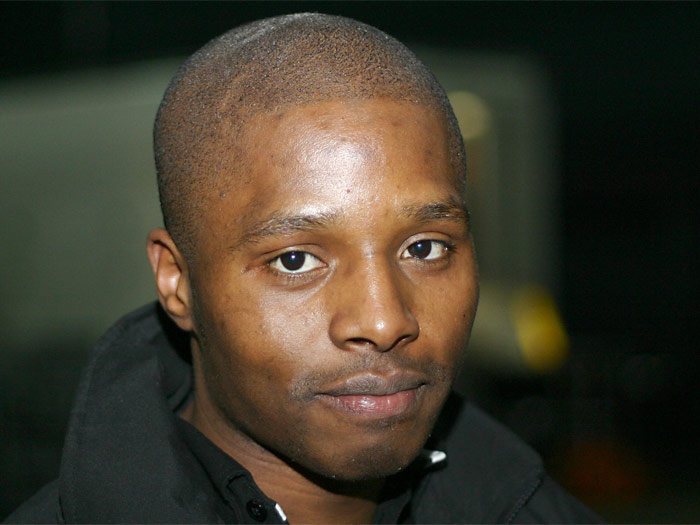
- Born: April 18, 1984 (age 42); Kinshasa, Zaire
- Other names: The African Warrior
- Nationality: Dutch; Congolese
- Height: 1.80 m (5 ft 11 in)
- Weight: 70 kg (154 lb; 11 st 0 lb)
- Division: Super Welterweight; Middleweight
- Style: Karate, kickboxing, Muay Thai
- Stance: Orthodox
- Fighting out of: Eindhoven, Netherlands
- Team: Team Ngimbi/ Fidan gym Siam Gym; Black Label; Calmaro Gym; Duran Gym
- Years active: 22 (2002–present)

Kickboxing record
- Total: 84
- Wins: 61
- By knockout: 19
- Losses: 23
- By knockout: 4
- Draws: 0
- Last updated on: December 15, 2012

Chris "The African Warrior" Ngimbi (born 18 April 1984 in Kinshasa) is a Congolese-Dutch Muay Thai kickboxer fighting out of Ngimbi Sports Academy in Pelt, Belgium. He is the two times It's Showtime 70MAX world champion fighting primarily within the It's Showtime and the K-1 Global Holding organizations. He also held the SUPERKOMBAT Middleweight Championship in 2016.

== Biography and career ==
Ngimbi was born in Kinshasa the capital city of the Democratic Republic of the Congo. He was born with a weak heart which doctors felt would make it hard for him to survive his first year. He spent his childhood in the African country but his family was forced to leave when he was 11 years old due to the civil war and the fact that his father had served in the political party of the recently ousted president Mobutu Sese Seko. Ngimbi relocated to the Netherlands and was a keen footballer in his teenage years and tipped to do well but decided to focus on kickboxing after making his amateur debut at 18 in Eindhoven representing the Duran Gym. He would later switch to the Calmaro gym in Helmond after his second B-Klass match with a fighting record of 12 wins and 1 loss. -

After fighting on the local scene for several years, Ngimbi was invited as a member of a Dutch team that would participate in a W.K.A. event in New York City. Due to an impressive knockout of his opponent he would be invited back to the states the following year to contest against Atlanta based Thai Khunpon Dechkampu for the W.K.A. intercontinental title, in what would be the first of a number of title fights on American soil. Ngimbi was successful on his return visit to the United States, winning the belt via KO and as winner of the intercontinental belt Ngimbi would get a shot at the W.K.A. world title in 2007, losing to Shane Campbell in their first match in Richmond, only to win the rematch six months later to claim his first world title.

In between trips across the Atlantic Ngimbi would have a number of fights in the Netherlands, defeating useful fighters such as Ray Staring, Kit Sitpholek and William Diender – the latter in the K-1 MAX Netherlands 2008 tournament in which he made the semi-finals only to lose to eventual winner Warren Stevelmans (who he had beaten back in 2006). He also made his debut with the It's Showtime organization defeating English fighter Rick Barnhill in Alkmaar. In February 2009 Ngimbi had another attempt to qualify for the K-1 MAX via a regional event in Utrecht but lost at the quarter-final stage to Marco Piqué. This decision was modified after protest from Ngimbi's corner. In May 2009 after the fight against Schneidmiller in the Amsterdam Arena he left the Calmaro gym to join Siam Gym in Valkenswaard. The switch had led to victories against fighters as Chahid Oulad el Hadj and Hafid el Boustati.

In 2010, Ngimbi's record with the It's Showtime organization (4 wins, 2 losses) led to the organization inviting him to challenge two-time It's Showtime champion Murat Direkçi for his world title belt in Athens at the end of the year. As the underdog, few expected the African Warrior to triumph but he pulled off a fifth round upset decision win against Direkçi to become the new It's Showtime 70MAX world champion. Ngimbi retained his It's Showtime 70MAX world title at the It's Showtime 2011 Lyon event, outclassing local fighter Willy Borrel on way to a trademark flying knee KO victory.

In December 2011, Ngimbi shocked the kickboxing world when he stated that he would make one more defence of his belt, against Andy Souwer in June 2012, and then retire. He lost the fight, but came back to his decision to retire so he could participate in the K-1 World Max.

He was stopped by Artur Kyshenko in round two at the quarter-finals of the K-1 World MAX 2012 World Championship Tournament Final in Athens, Greece on December 15, 2012.

Ngimbi Took a break from kickboxing in 2013 and came back stronger in 2014 fighting for the biggest organisations in Asia like Kunlun Fight, W5 Professional Kickboxing and the current number 1 biggest media property in martial arts, ONE Championship. Besides he will go on to conquer one more belt in 2016 to become the SUPERKOMBAT Fighting Championship World Champion.

As of 2017 Ngimbi moved to Belgium where he opened the gym Ngimbi Sports Academy in 2019 and is preparing the next generation kickboxers for the big stage.

== Titles and accomplishments ==
- SUPERKOMBAT Fighting Championship
  - 2016 SUPERKOMBAT Middleweight Champion -72.5 kg.
- W5 Professional Kickboxing
  - 2015 W5 XXXI Tournament Runner-up -71 kg
  - 2015 W5 XXX Tournament Champion -71 kg
- It's Showtime
  - 2011 It's Showtime 70MAX world champion -70 kg (2nd title defence)
  - 2010 It's Showtime 70MAX world champion -70 kg
- World Kickboxing Association
  - 2007 W.K.A. Muay Thai super welterweight world champion -70 kg
  - 2005 W.K.A. Muay Thai super welterweight intercontinental champion -70 kg
- World Full Contact Association
  - 2003 World Full Contact Association (W.F.C.A.) European champion

Awards

- Combat Press
  - 2015 Knockout of the Year (vs. Ilia Usachev)

== Kickboxing record ==
Kickboxing record
61 wins (19 (T)KOs, 31 decisions), 23 losses
Date	Result	Opponent	Event	Location	Method	Round	Time	Record
2018-07-27	Win	(Italy) Armen Petrosyan	ONE Championship: Reign of Kings	Philippines	Decision (split)	3	3:00	32-21
2018-05-18	Loss	(Thailand) Yodsanklai Fairtex	ONE Championship: Unstoppable Dreams	Singapore	Decision (unanimous)	3	3:00	31–21
2017-10-14	Loss	(Italy) Giorgio Petrosyan	PetrosyanMania	Monza, Italy	Decision (unanimous)	5	3:00	31–20
For the vacant ISKA Super Welterweight (-70 kg/154 lb) K-1 Rules World Championship.
2016-11-12	Loss	(Romania) Amansio Paraschiv	SUPERKOMBAT World Grand Prix 2016 Final	Bucharest, Romania	Decision (unanimous)	3	3:00	31–20
Lost SUPERKOMBAT Middleweight Title -72.5 kg.
2016-10-01	Win	(Romania) Amansio Paraschiv	SUPERKOMBAT World Grand Prix 2016 Final Elimination	Iași, Romania	Decision (unanimous)	3	3:00	31–19
Wins SUPERKOMBAT Middleweight Title -72.5 kg.
2016-03-25	Loss	(South Korea) Lee Sung-hyun	Kunlun Fight 40, Final	Tongling, China	Decision	3	3:00	30–19
2016-03-25	Win	(Ukraine) Sergey Kulyaba	Kunlun Fight 40, Semi-finals	Tongling, China	KO	3	2:59	30–18
2015-12-05	Loss	(Russia) Artem Pashporin	W5 Grand Prix Vienna XXXI, Final	Vienna, Austria	Decision (unanimous)	3	3:00	29–18
For the W5 XXXI Tournament Title -71 kg.
2015-12-05	Win	(Russia) Evgeniy Kurovsky	W5 Grand Prix Vienna XXXI, Semi-finals	Vienna, Austria	Decision (unanimous)	3	3:00	29–17
2015-08-30	Win	(Russia) Ilya Usachev	W5 Grand Prix Moscow XXX	Moscow, Russia	KO (right knee)	2	2:31	28–17
Wins W5 XXX Tournament Title -71 kg.
2015-08-30	Win	(Ukraine) Valentin Ribalko	W5 Grand Prix Moscow XXX	Moscow, Russia	TKO (referee stoppage)	1	3:00	27–17
2015-04-24	Loss	(Ukraine) Enriko Gogokhia	W5 Grand Prix - Kitek	Moscow, Russia	Decision	3	3:00	26–17
2015-02-28	Loss	(Turkey) Adem Bozkurt	Akın Dövüş Arenası	İstanbul, Turkey	Decision	3	3:00	26–16
2014-10-04	Win	(Morocco) Mourad Ouchen	Mix Fight Gala XVI		Decision (unanimous)	3	3:00	26-15
2014-07-27	Loss	(China) Jiao Fukai	Kunlun Fight 7 - World MAX 2014 Final 8	Zhoukou, China	Decision	3	3:00	25–15
2013-11-15	Loss	(Slovenia) Mirko Vorkapić	FFC09: McSweeney vs. Traunmuller	Ljubljana, Slovenia	Decision (unanimous)	3	3:00	25–14
2012-12-15	Loss	(Ukraine) Artur Kyshenko	K-1 World MAX 2012 World Championship Tournament Final, Quarter-finals	Athens, Greece	TKO (referee stoppage)	2	1:48	25–13
2012-06-30	Loss	(Netherlands) Andy Souwer	Music Hall & BFN Group present: It's Showtime 57 & 58	Brussels, Belgium	Decision	5	3:00	25–12
Lost It's Showtime 70MAX world title -70 kg (2nd title defence).
2012-05-27	Win	(Thailand) Longern Superpro Samui	K-1 World MAX 2012 World Championship Tournament Final 16	Madrid, Spain	Decision (unanimous)	3	3:00	25–11
2012-03-24	Loss	(France) Gregory Choplin	Thaiboxing Showtime 3	Hazebrouck, France	Decision (unanimous)	3	3:00	24–11
2012-01-28	Loss	(Armenia) Harut Grigorian	It's Showtime 2012 in Leeuwarden	Leeuwarden, Netherlands	TKO (cut)	2	1:22	24–10
2011-09-24	Loss	(Netherlands) Robin van Roosmalen	It's Showtime "Fast & Furious 70MAX", Semi-finals	Brussels, Belgium	Decision (split)	3	3:00	24–9
2011-09-24	Win	(Turkey) Murat Direkçi	It's Showtime "Fast & Furious 70MAX", Quarter-finals	Brussels, Belgium	Decision (unanimous)	3	3:00	24–8
2011-05-14	Win	(France) Willy Borrel	It's Showtime 2011 Lyon	Lyon, France	KO (left flying knee)	2	2:58	23–8
Retains It's Showtime 70MAX world title -70 kg (1st title defence).
2010-12-11	Win	(Turkey) Murat Direkçi	It's Showtime 2010 Athens	Athens, Greece	Decision (5–0)	5	3:00	22–8
Wins Direkçi's It's Showtime 70MAX world title -70 kg.
2010-05-29	Win	(Suriname) Anthony Nekrui	It's Showtime 2010 Amsterdam	Amsterdam, Netherlands	TKO (ref. stop./flying knee)	3	1:33	21–8
2010-02-27	Win	(Morocco) Hafid el Boustati	Amsterdam Fight Club	Amsterdam, Netherlands	Ext.R decision (unanimous)	4	3:00	20–8
2009-11-21	Win	(Morocco) Chahid Oulad El Hadj	It's Showtime 2009 Barneveld	Barneveld, Netherlands	Decision (unanimous)	3	3:00	19–8
2009-10-24	Loss	(Armenia) Harut Grigorian	It's Showtime 2009 Lommel	Lommel, Belgium	Ext.R decision	4	3:00	18–8
2009-05-16	Win	(Germany) Dennis Schneidmiller	It's Showtime 2009 Amsterdam	Amsterdam, Netherlands	Decision (unanimous)	3	3:00	18–7
2009-03-01	Loss	(Suriname) Marco Piqué	K-1 World MAX 2009 Europe, Quarter-finals	Utrecht, Netherlands	Ext.R decision	4	3:00	17–7
2008-11-29	Loss	(Netherlands) Joerie Mes	It's Showtime 2008 Eindhoven	Eindhoven, Netherlands	KO (left hook)	2	2:08	16–7
2008-10-05	Win	(Netherlands) Chad Bischop	Ahoy Rotterdam	Rotterdam, Netherlands	Decision (unanimous)	3	3:00	16–6
2008-09-06	Win	(England) Rick Barnhill	It's Showtime 2008 Alkmaar	Alkmaar, Netherlands	TKO (doc. stop.)	2		15–6
2008-04-26	Loss	(Italy) Giorgio Petrosyan	K-1 World GP 2008 Amsterdam, Super Fight	Amsterdam, Netherlands	Decision (unanimous)	3	3:00	14–6
2008-02-17	Loss	(South Africa) Warren Stevelmans	K-1 MAX Netherlands 2008, Semi-finals	Utrecht, Netherlands	TKO (low kicks)	2	1:48	14–5
2008-02-17	Win	(Netherlands) William Diender	K-1 MAX Netherlands 2008, Quarter-finals	Utrecht, Netherlands	Decision (split)	3	3:00	14–4
2007-11-24	Win	(Morocco) Kamal Chabrani	Rings "Prepare for Glory"	Hilversum, Netherlands	KO (left knee)	1	0:36	13–4
2007-09-27	Win	(Canada) Shane Campbell	Combat Sports Challenge 22 "The Reckoning"	Richmond, VA, USA	Decision (unanimous)	5	3:00	12–4
Wins Campbell's W.K.A. Muaythai super welterweight world title -70 kg.
2007-06-02	Win	(Netherlands) Ray Staring	Gentleman Fight Night 2007	Tilburg, Netherlands	Decision (unanimous)	5	3:00	11–4
2007-05-13	Win	(Thailand) Kit Sitpholek	Fight Night Veghel	Veghel, Netherlands	Decision (unanimous)	5	3:00	10–4
2007-03-24	Loss	(Canada) Shane Campbell	Combat Sports Challenge 19	Richmond, VA, USA	Decision (majority)	5	3:00	9–4
Fight was for vacant W.K.A. Muaythai super welterweight world title -70 kg.
2006-12-03	Win	(Senegal) Otmar Diagne	2H2H	Maastricht, Netherlands	Decision (unanimous)	5	3:00	9–3
2006-09-24	Loss	(England) James France	Master Sken's Combat Super Fights	Manchester, England, UK	Decision (unanimous)	5	3:00	8–3
2006-06-04	Loss	(Suriname) Winston Martens	Kickbox Gala Druten, Quarter-finals	Druten, Netherlands	Decision (unanimous)	3	3:00	8–2
2006-04-15	Win	(South Africa) Warren Stevelmans	Al-Fid Thaibox Gala	Eindhoven, Netherlands	Decision (unanimous)	3	3:00	8–1
2006-01-28	Win	(Netherlands) Jimmy Eimers	Face to Face III, Sporthal de Mheenpark	Apeldoorn, Netherlands	Decision (unanimous)	5	3:00	7–1
2005-12-03	Win	(Morocco) Mohamed Rahhoui	Friends Gym Promotion	Brussels, Belgium	Decision (majority)	5	3:00	6–1
2005-09-16	Win	(Thailand) Khunpon Dechkampu	Pride and Glory	Duluth, GA, USA	TKO	3		5–1
Wins W.K.A. Muaythai super welterweight intercontinental title -70 kg.
2005-05-15	Win	(Belgium) Khalid Raiss	WFCA Gala in Druten	Druten, Netherlands	Decision (unanimous)	5	2:00	4–1
2005-05-08	Win	(Belgium) Murat Delialioglu	Gala Helmond Calmaro Gym WFCA	Helmond, Netherlands	Decision (unanimous)	5	2:00	3–1
2004-09-10	Loss	(United States) RaKarma Young	Mayhem on Mulberry Street 3, St. Patrick's Youth Center	New York, NY, USA	Decision (majority)	5	3:00	2–1
2004-05-14	Win	(United States) Emyr Dakin	Mayhem on Mulberry Street 2, St. Patrick's Youth Center	New York, NY, USA	KO (high kick)	1	0:58	2–0
2004-05-08	Win	(Belgium) Abdussamed Delialioglu	Gala Helmond Calmaro Gym	Helmond, Netherlands	Decision (unanimous)	5	2:00	1–0
Legend: Win Loss Draw/no contest Notes

== See also ==
- List of It's Showtime events
- List of It's Showtime champions
- List of K-1 events
- List of male kickboxers
