= List of It's Showtime (kickboxing) events =

This is a list of events held and scheduled by It's Showtime, a kickboxing and mixed martial arts organization based in Amsterdam, Netherlands. The list consists of all official It's Showtime events. The first event, It's Showtime - It's Showtime, took place on October 24, 1999, at Kennemer Sportcenter in Haarlem, Netherlands.

== List of It's Showtime events ==
2012 events
Date	No.	Event	Location	Venue
2012-11-10	60	It's Showtime 60	São Paulo, Brazil	
2012-07-29	VIII	REBELS.12 & It's Showtime Japan Countdown-2	Tokyo, Japan	Differ Ariake
2012-07-21	59	Street Culture, Federación Canaria de Kickboxing & Fightclub Group present: It's Showtime 59	Tenerife, Spain	
2012-06-30	57&58	Music Hall & BFN Group present: It's Showtime 57 & 58	Brussels, Belgium	Forest National
2012-05-12	56	Siam Gym Belgium presents: It's Showtime 56	Kortrijk, Belgium	
2012-01-28	54&55	It's Showtime 2012 in Leeuwarden	Leeuwarden, Netherlands	WTC Expo
2012-01-21	VII	REBELS.10 & It's Showtime Japan Countdown-7	Japan	
2011 events
Date	No.	Event	Location	Venue
2011-12-22	VI	It's Showtime Japan 6	Tokyo, Japan	Korakuen Hall
2011-11-13	V	It's Showtime Japan 5	Tokyo, Japan	Differ Ariake
2011-11-12	53	Street Culture, Fight Club Group & Canary Kickboxing Federation presents: It's Showtime 53	Tenerife, Spain	Pabellón Santiago Martín
2011-10-23	IV	REBELS.9 & It's Showtime Japan 4	Tokyo, Japan	Differ Ariake
2011-09-25	52	BFN Group & Music Hall presents: It's Showtime "Fast & Furious 70MAX"	Brussels, Belgium	Forest National
2011-09-11	III	It's Showtime Japan 3	Japan	
2011-08-28	II	It's Showtime Japan 2	Japan	
2011-07-18	I	REBELS 8 & It's Showtime Japan Countdown-1	Tokyo, Japan	Differ Ariake
2011-06-18	51	Fix Events & Fightclub Group presents: It's Showtime 2011	Madrid, Spain	Palacio de Deportes
2011-06-11	50	BFN Group presents: It's Showtime Warsaw	Warsaw, Poland	Warszawskie Centrum EXPO XXI
2011-05-21	49	Fightclub presents: It's Showtime 2011	Amsterdam, Netherlands	The Sand
2011-05-14	48	It's Showtime 2011 Lyon	Lyon, France	Palais des Sports de Gerland
2011-03-26	47	BFN Group presents: It's Showtime Brussels	Brussels, Belgium	The Event Lounge
2011-03-06	46	Fightingstars presents: It's Showtime Sporthallen Zuid	Amsterdam, Netherlands	Sporthallen Zuid
2010 events
Date	No.	Event	Location	Venue
2010-12-18	45	Fightclub presents: It's Showtime 2010	Amsterdam, Netherlands	The Sand
2010-12-11	44	Yiannis Evgenikos presents: It’s Showtime Athens	Athens, Greece	Peace and Friendship Stadium
2010-09-12	43	Fightingstars presents: It's Showtime 2010	Amsterdam, Netherlands	Sporthallen Zuid
2010-05-29	41&42	It's Showtime 2010 Amsterdam	Amsterdam, Netherlands	Amsterdam Arena
2010-04-17	40	It's Showtime 2010 Budapest	Budapest, Hungary	Syma Sport and Events Centre
2010-03-13	39	Oktagon presents: It's Showtime 2010	Milan, Italy	PalaSharp
2010-02-13	38	It's Showtime 2010 Prague	Prague, Czech Republic	O2 Arena
2009 events
Date	No.	Event	Location	Venue
2009-11-21	37	It's Showtime 2009 Barneveld	Barneveld, Netherlands	Veluwehal
2009-10-24	36	It's Showtime 2009 Lommel	Lommel, Belgium	De Soeverein
2009-08-29	35	It's Showtime 2009 Budapest	Budapest, Hungary	Papp László Sportaréna
2009-08-15	34	It’s Showtime 2009 Istanbul (Cancelled)	Istanbul, Turkey	Inönü Stadyumu
2009-05-16	33	It's Showtime 2009 Amsterdam	Amsterdam, Netherlands	Amsterdam Arena
2009-03-14	32	Oktagon presents: It's Showtime 2009	Milan, Italy	PalaSharp
2009-02-08	31	Fights at the Border presents: It's Showtime 2009	Antwerp, Belgium	Lotto Arena
2008 events
Date	No.	Event	Location	Venue
2008-11-29	30	It's Showtime 2008 Eindhoven	Eindhoven, Netherlands	Indoor Sportcentrum Eindhoven
2008-09-06	29	It's Showtime 2008 Alkmaar	Alkmaar, Netherlands	Hoornse Vaart
2008-03-15	26	Balans: It’s Showtime 75MAX Trophy Final 2008	's-Hertogenbosch, Netherlands	Maaspoort
2007 events
Date	No.	Event	Location	Venue
2007-09-23	25	It's Showtime 75MAX Trophy 2007 - Portugal	Vilamoura, Portugal	Casino Vilamoura
2007-03-24	23&24	Fights at the Border presents: It's Showtime Trophy 2007	Lommel, Belgium	Soeverein Hal
2007-02-25	22	It's Showtime 75MAX Trophy 2007 - Manchester	(United Kingdom) Altrincham, Greater Manchester, UK	Altrincham Leisure Centre
2007-02-02	21	It's Showtime 75MAX Trophy 2007 - Zwolle	Zwolle, Netherlands	WRZV Hallen Zwolle
2006 events
Date	No.	Event	Location	Venue
2006-12-03	20	It's Showtime 2006 Alkmaar	Alkmaar, Netherlands	Hoornse Vaart
2006-09-23	19	It's Showtime 75MAX Trophy Final 2006	Rotterdam, Netherlands	TOP Sporthallen Rotterdam
2006-02-18	17	It's Showtime 75MAX Trophy, 1st Round - Belgium	Mortsel, Belgium	Sporthal Den Drab
2005 events
Date	No.	Event	Location	Venue
2005-12-18	16	It's Showtime 75MAX Trophy, 1st Round - Prague	Prague, Czech Republic	Kongresové centrum Praha
2005-10-30	15	It's Showtime 75MAX Trophy, 1st Round - Alkmaar	Alkmaar, Netherlands	Hoornse Vaart
2005-10-02	14	It's Showtime 75MAX Trophy, 1st Round - Tilburg	Tilburg, Netherlands	Stadssporthal
2005-06-12	12&13	It's Showtime Boxing & MMA Event 2005 Amsterdam	Amsterdam, Netherlands	Amsterdam Arena
2004 events
Date	No.	Event	Location	Venue
2004-05-20	10&11	It's Showtime 2004 Amsterdam	Amsterdam, Netherlands	Amsterdam Arena
2003-06-08	8&9	It's Showtime 2003 Amsterdam	Amsterdam, Netherlands	Amsterdam Arena
2002-09-29	6&7	It's Showtime – As Usual / Battle Time	Haarlem, Netherlands	Kennemer Sportcenter
2001-10-21	5	It's Showtime - Original	Haarlem, Netherlands	Kennemer Sportcenter
2000-12-12	4	It's Showtime - Christmas Edition	Haarlem, Netherlands	Kennemer Sportcenter
2000-10-22	3	It's Showtime - Exclusive	Haarlem, Netherlands	Kennemer Sportcenter
1999-10-24	1&2	It's Showtime - It's Showtime	Haarlem, Netherlands	Kennemer Sportcenter

== See also ==
- List of It's Showtime (kickboxing) champions
- List of K-1 events
