= List of It's Showtime (kickboxing) champions =

This is a list of It's Showtime champions.

== Its Showtime Champions ==
It's Showtime last champions
| Division | Champion | Nationality | Since | Title defenses |
|---|---|---|---|---|
| Heavyweight | Daniel Ghita | Romania | Jan 28, 2012 | 0 |
| 95MAX | Danyo Ilunga | (Democratic Republic of the Congo) DR Congo | Mar 6, 2011 | 3 |
| 85MAX | Jason Wilnis | Netherlands | Nov 10, 2012 | 0 |
| 77MAX | Artem Levin | Russia | Dec 18, 2010 | 1 |
| 73MAX | L'houcine Ouzgni | Morocco | Jan 28, 2012 | 0 |
| 69MAX | Andy Souwer | Netherlands | Jun 30, 2012 | 0 |
| 65MAX | Orono Wor Petchpun | Thailand | May 16, 2009 | 1 |
| 61MAX | Masahiro Yamamoto | Japan | Jul 21, 2012 | 0 |

=== It's Showtime Heavyweight Championship ===
It's Showtime Heavyweight champions
| Date | Champion | Nationality | Event | Location | Title fights / no. of defenses |
|---|---|---|---|---|---|
| 2012-01-28 - last | Daniel Ghiţă | Romania | It's Showtime 2012 in Leeuwarden | Leeuwarden, Netherlands | 0 2012-01-28 (Netherlands) Hesdy Gerges |
| 2010-05-29 - 2012-01-28 | Hesdy Gerges | Netherlands | It's Showtime 2010 Amsterdam | Amsterdam, Netherlands | 0 2010-05-29 (Morocco) Badr Hari |
| 2009-05-16 - 2010-05-29 | Badr Hari | Netherlands | It's Showtime 2010 Prague; It's Showtime 2009 Amsterdam | Prague, Czech Republic; Amsterdam, Netherlands | 1 2010-02-13 (Tunisia) Mourad Bouzidi; 0 2009-05-16 (Netherlands) Semmy Schilt |

=== It's Showtime 95MAX Championship ===
It's Showtime 95MAX champions
| Date | Champion | Nationality | Event | Location | Title fights / no. of defenses |
|---|---|---|---|---|---|
| 2011-03-06 - last | Danyo Ilunga | (Democratic Republic of the Congo) DR Congo | It's Showtime 57 & 58; It's Showtime 53; It's Showtime Warsaw; It's Showtime Sporthallen Zuid | Brussels, Belgium; Tenerife, Spain; Warsaw, Poland; Amsterdam, Netherlands | 3 2012-06-30 (Belgium) Filip Verlinden; 2 2011-11-12 (Spain) Loren Javier Jorge; 1 2011-06-11 (Serbia) Nenad Pagonis; 0 2011-03-06 (Curaçao) Wendell Roche |
| 2008-11-29 - vacated | Tyrone Spong | Suriname | It's Showtime 2008 Eindhoven | Eindhoven, Netherlands | 0 2008-11-29 (Belarus) Zabit Samedov |

=== It's Showtime 85MAX Championship ===
It's Showtime 85MAX champions
| Date | Champion | Nationality | Event | Location | Title fights / no. of defenses |
|---|---|---|---|---|---|
| 2012-11-10 Last | Jason Wilnis | Netherlands | It's Showtime 60 | São Paulo Brazil | def. Alex Pereira in 2012 |
| 2011-05-21 | Sahak Parparyan | Armenia | Fightclub presents: It's Showtime 2011 | Amsterdam Netherlands | def. Amir Zeyada in 2011; def. Andrew Tate in 2012 |
| 2009-08-29 | Melvin Manhoef | Suriname | It's Showtime 2009 Budapest | Budapest Hungary | def. Dénes Rácz in 2009 |

=== It's Showtime 77MAX Championship ===
It's Showtime 77MAX champions
| Date | Champion | Nationality | Event | Location | Title fights / no. of defenses |
|---|---|---|---|---|---|
| 2010-12-18 - last | Artem Levin | Russia | It's Showtime "Fast & Furious 70MAX"; Fightclub presents: It's Showtime 2010 | Brussels, Belgium; Amsterdam, Netherlands | 1 2011-09-24 (Suriname) Murthel Groenhart; 0 2010-12-18 (Morocco) L'houcine Ouzgni |
| 2010-03-13 - stripped | Cosmo Alexandre | Brazil | It's Showtime 2010 Budapest; Oktagon presents: It's Showtime 2010 | Budapest, Hungary; Milan, Italy | 1 2010-04-17 (Hungary) Csaba Györfy; 0 2010-03-13 (Belarus) Dmitry Shakuta |
| 2008-09-05 - 2010-03-13 | Dmitry Shakuta | Belarus | It's Showtime 2009 Barneveld; It's Showtime 2009 Budapest; It's Showtime 2008 Alkmaar | Barneveld, Netherlands; Budapest, Hungary; Alkmaar, Netherlands | 2 2009-11-21 (Netherlands) Sem Braan; 1 2009-08-29 (France) Gregory Choplin; 0 2008-09-05 (Netherlands) Sem Braan |

=== It's Showtime 73MAX Championship ===
It's Showtime 73MAX champions
| Date | Champion | Nationality | Event | Location | Title fights / no. of defenses |
|---|---|---|---|---|---|
| 2012-01-28 - last | L'houcine Ouzgni | Netherlands | It's Showtime 2012 in Leeuwarden | Leeuwarden, Netherlands | 0 2012-01-28 (France) Yohan Lidon |
| 2011-05-14 - 2012-01-28 | Yohan Lidon | France | It's Showtime 2011 Lyon | Lyon, France | 0 2011-05-14 (Armenia) Marat Grigorian |

=== It's Showtime 70MAX Championship ===
It's Showtime 70MAX champions
| Date | Champion | Nationality | Event | Location | Title fights / no. of defenses |
|---|---|---|---|---|---|
| 2012-06-30 - last | Andy Souwer | Netherlands | It's Showtime 57 & 58 | Brussels, Belgium | 0 2012-06-30 (Democratic Republic of the Congo) Chris Ngimbi |
| 2010-12-11 - 2012-06-30 | Chris Ngimbi | (Democratic Republic of the Congo) DR Congo | It's Showtime 2011 Lyon; Yiannis Evgenikos presents: It's Showtime Athens | Lyon, France; Athens, Greece | 1 2011-05-14 (France) Willy Borrel; 0 2010-12-11 (Turkey) Murat Direkçi |
| 2009-02-08 - 2010-12-11 | Murat Direkçi | Turkey | It's Showtime 2009 Lommel; Fights at the Border presents: It's Showtime 2009 | Lommel, Belgium; Antwerp, Belgium | 1 2009-10-24 (Morocco) Chahid Oulad El Hadj; 0 2010-03-13 (Armenia) Gago Drago |

=== It's Showtime 65MAX Championship ===
It's Showtime 65MAX champions
| Date | Champion | Nationality | Event | Location | Title fights / no. of defenses |
|---|---|---|---|---|---|
| 2009-05-16 - last | Orono Wor Petchpun | Thailand | It's Showtime 2010 Amsterdam; It's Showtime 2009 Amsterdam | Amsterdam, Netherlands; Amsterdam, Netherlands | 1 2010-05-29 (Armenia) Atty Gol; 0 2009-05-16 (Belgium) Hassan El Hamzaoui |
| 2009-03-14 - 2009-05-16 | Hassan El Hamzaoui | Belgium | Oktagon presents: It's Showtime 2009 | Milan, Italy | 0 2009-03-14 (Italy) Frederico Pacini |

=== It's Showtime 61MAX Championship ===
It's Showtime 61MAX champions
| Date | Champion | Nationality | Event | Location | Title fights / no. of defenses |
|---|---|---|---|---|---|
| 2012-07-21 - last | Masahiro Yamamoto | Japan | It's Showtime 59 | Tenerife, Spain | 0 2012-07-21 (Spain) Javier Hernandez |
| 2011-06-18 - 2012-07-21 | Javier Hernandez | Spain | It's Showtime 2011 Madrid | Madrid, Spain | 0 2011-06-18 (France) Karim Bennoui |
| 2011-03-26 - 2011-06-18 | Karim Bennoui | France | It's Showtime Brussels 2011 | Brussels, Belgium | 0 2010-12-11 (Suriname) Sergio Wielzen |
| 2010-09-12 - 2011-03-26 | Sergio Wielzen | Suriname | It's Showtime Athens 2010; Fightingstars presents: It's Showtime 2010 | Athens, Greece; Amsterdam, Netherlands | 1 2010-12-11 (Japan) Masahiro Yamamoto; 0 2010-09-12 (France) Michael Peynaud |

== Trophy Champions ==
=== It's Showtime 75MAX Trophy champions ===
It's Showtime 75MAX Trophy champions
| Date | Champion | Nationality | Event | Location | Runner-up | Nationality |
|---|---|---|---|---|---|---|
| 2008-03-15 | Dmitry Shakuta | Belarus | Balans: It's Showtime 75MAX Trophy Final 2008 | 's-Hertogenbosch, Netherlands | Gregory Choplin | France |
| 2006-09-23 | Şahin Yakut | Turkey | It's Showtime 75MAX Trophy Final 2006 | Rotterdam, Netherlands | Ondřej Hutník | Czech Republic |

=== It's Showtime 75MAX Trophy preliminary champions ===
It's Showtime 75MAX Trophy preliminary champions
| Date | Champion | Nationality | Event | Location | Runner-up | Nationality |
|---|---|---|---|---|---|---|
| 2007-09-23 | Luis Reis | Portugal | It's Showtime 75MAX Trophy Portugal | Vilamoura, Portugal | Ricardo Fernandes | Portugal |
| 2007-02-25 | Jan de Keyzer | Belgium | It's Showtime 75MAX Trophy Manchester | Altrincham, UK | Steven Jones | England |
| 2007-02-02 | Karapet Papijan | Armenia | It's Showtime 75MAX Trophy Zwolle | Zwolle, Netherlands | Tarek Slimani | Morocco |
| 2006-02-18 | Alviar Lima | Cape Verde | It's Showtime 75MAX Trophy Belgium, Pool A | Zwolle, Netherlands | Imro Main | Suriname |
| 2006-02-18 | Dmitry Shakuta | Belarus | It's Showtime 75MAX Trophy Belgium, Pool B | Zwolle, Netherlands | Yücel Fidan | Turkey |
| 2005-12-18 | Ondřej Hutník | Czech Republic | It's Showtime 75MAX Trophy PraguE, Pool A | Prague, Czech Republic | Sem Braan | Netherlands |
| 2005-12-18 | Şahin Yakut | Turkey | It's Showtime 75MAX Trophy PraguE, Pool B | Prague, Czech Republic | Jomhod Kiatadisak | Thailand |
| 2005-10-30 | Najim Ettouhali | Morocco | It's Showtime 75MAX Trophy AlkmaaR, Pool A | Alkmaar, Netherlands | Donald Berner | Netherlands |
| 2005-10-30 | Jiri Zak | Czech Republic | It's Showtime 75MAX Trophy AlkmaaR, Pool B | Alkmaar, Netherlands | Tarek Slimani | Turkey |
| 2005-10-02 | Joerie Mes | Netherlands | It's Showtime 75MAX Trophy TilburG, Pool A | Tilburg, Netherlands | Yücel Fidan | Turkey |
| 2005-10-02 | Emil Zoraj | Croatia | It's Showtime 75MAX Trophy TilburG, Pool B | Tilburg, Netherlands | Sem Braan | Netherlands |

== It’s Showtime Fast, Furious Champions ==
=== It's Showtime Fast & Furious 70MAX champions ===
It's Showtime 75MAX Trophy champions
| Date | Champion | Nationality | Event | Location | Runner-up | Nationality |
|---|---|---|---|---|---|---|
| 2011-09-24 | Robin van Roosmalen | Netherlands | BFN Group & Music Hall presents: It's Showtime "Fast & Furious 70MAX" | Brussels, Belgium | Artur Kyshenko | Ukraine |

== MMA Champions ==
=== It's Showtime 70MAX MMA Championship ===
It's Showtime 70MAX MMA champions
| Date | Champion | Nationality | Event | Location | Title fights / no. of defenses |
|---|---|---|---|---|---|
| 2006-12-02 - last | Thiago Tavares | Brazil | It's Showtime 2006 Alkmaar | Alkmaar, Netherlands | 0 2006-12-02 (Netherlands) Marc Duncan |

== See also ==
- List of It's Showtime (kickboxing) events
- List of kickboxers
