= Sem Braan =

Dutch martial artist

- Born: October 6, 1979 (age 47)
- Other names: Semtex
- Nationality: Dutch
- Height: 1.86 m (6 ft 1 in)
- Weight: 82 kg (181 lb; 12.9 st)
- Division: Super Middleweight
- Style: Muay Thai
- Stance: Orthodox
- Fighting out of: Amsterdam, Netherlands
- Team: Mejiro Gym

Kickboxing record
- Total: 80
- Wins: 57
- By knockout: 15
- Losses: 21
- Draws: 2
- Last updated on: December 7, 2013

Sem "Semtex" Braan (born October 6, 1979) is a Dutch Muay Thai super middleweight kickboxer fighting out of Amsterdam, Netherlands for Mejiro Gym. He is the 2008 It's Showtime Reality Show winner currently competing in the It's Showtime 77MAX division.

== Biography and career ==
Sem Braan made his debut with the It's Showtime organization in 2005 losing a super fight via decision to Ondřej Hutník. He was invited to take part in the inaugural It's Showtime Trophy (75 kg/165.35 lbs weight class) in a preliminary tournament for the final to be held the following year. He made the final in Tilburg only to lose to Emil Zoraj. Braan was given a second chance to qualify at the It's Showtime event in Prague at the end of the year, again reaching the final only to lose again – this time to Ondřej Hutník, the man who had beaten him on his debut earlier that year.

The following year Braan made his K-1 debut at the K-1 MAX Canarias 2006, dropping down in weight to take part in an eight-man tournament (70 kg/154 lbs weight class). Never known for his ability for finishing opponents, Braan nevertheless blitzed through all opposition on the night, stopping all three opponents on his way to the title. He added to his title collection in the spring of 2007, winning the W.A.K.O. European title in Porto against a Portuguese opponent he had defeated a couple of months previously.

Braan was invited to the second It's Showtime Trophy final in 2008, despite having lost in a qualifying tournament the previous year. He made the semi-finals of the tournament, beating Jiri Zak before losing to eventual winner Dmitry Shakuta by decision. Later that year he won the It's Showtime Reality Show by beating Cosmo Alexandre in the final held at the K-1 World Grand Prix 2008 in Amsterdam and earned himself a shot against the It's Showtime Trophy champion Dmitry Shakuta for the inaugural It's Showtime 77MAX world title later that year. In the title fight in Alkmaar Braan lost on points despite a late rally in the last two rounds, in which both fighters received eight counts. Braan would get another shot at the title, several years later, again facing Shakuta for the belt. The defending champion once more came out on top in the encounter, winning his third match in the trilogy between the pair via a comfortable point's decision. In 2011 Sem won his first world title - winning the W.A.K.O. Pro world belt in Milan, Italy by defeating Mohamed Belkacem by unanimous decision after five rounds in a match where both fighters received 8 counts - Sem in the fourth and Belkacem in the fifth.

In a battle between two of the world's top 10 light heavyweights, Braan lost to Constantin Țuțu via decision at the KOK World Grand Prix 2012 in Chișinău, Moldova on September 29, 2012. He lost to Rickard Nordstrand via second-round KO at Fight Night 08 in Stockholm, Sweden on August 17, 2013.

Braan won, by defeating Errol Koning at Fight Fans 6 in Amsterdam, Holland on October 5, 2013. On February 8, 2014, Braan won by beating Marino Schouten for the second time at Fight Fans 8 in Amsterdam.

On December 1, 2014, Sem Braan opened his own gym, Mejiro Gym Wormer. By starting this Mejiro Gym division Braan shares his knowledge and experience with other fighters and shows kickboxing is for everyone both recreational and competition level.

== Titles ==
- 2019 WFCA -79 kg World title
- 2017 K1 Andy Hug Memorial 2017 Tournament runner-up
- 2016 WFL -76 kg Tournament Champion
- 2011 W.A.K.O. Pro K-1 Rules world champion -85 kg
- 2008 It's Showtime Reality Show winner -75 kg
- 2007 W.A.K.O. Pro K-1 Rules European champion -80 kg
- 2006 K-1 MAX Canarias champion -70 kg
- 2005 It's Showtime 75MAX Trophy Prague Pool B runner-up -75 kg
- 2005 It's Showtime 75MAX Trophy Tilburg Pool B runner-up -75 kg

== Kickboxing record ==
Kickboxing record
51 wins (13 (T)KOs), 20 losses, 2 draws
Date	Result	Opponent	Event	Location	Method	Round	Time
2017-07-10	Loss	(France) Dylan Colin	K1 Andy Hug Memorial 2017, Final	Zug, Switzerland	Decision (unanimous)	3	3:00
Wins K1 Andy Hug Memorial 2017 Tournament Title
2017-07-10	Win	(Switzerland) Daniel Stefanovski	K1 Andy Hug Memorial 2017, Semi-final	Zug, Switzerland	Decision (unanimous)	3	3:00
2016-04-03	Loss	(Suriname) Murthel Groenhart	WFL - Where Heroes Meet Legends, Final	Almere, The Netherlands	KO (right cross)	3	
For the WFL -76 kg Tournament Title.
2016-04-03	Win	(Suriname) Darryl Sichtman	WFL - Where Heroes Meet Legends, Semi-final	Almere, The Netherlands	Decision (unanimous)	3	3:00
2016-2-13	Win	(Netherlands) Ayoub Allach	Rising Sun	Beilen, Netherlands	Decision	5	3:00
2015-10-18	Win	(Netherlands) Errol Koning	WFL "Unfinished Business"	Hoofddorp, Netherlands	Decision	3	3:00
2015-04-12	Loss	(Morocco) Hicham El Gaoui	World Fighting League, Semi-finals (-84 kg)	Hoofddorp, Netherlands	Decision	3	3:00
2014-12-06	Win	(Netherlands) Hamza Rouki	Fight Fans : Prepare for glory	Amsterdam, Netherlands	Decision	3	3:00
2014-11-01	Win	(Netherlands) Miles Simson	Bari Gym Kickboxgala 10	Noordwijkerhout, Netherlands	Decision	3	3:00
2014-09-13	Win	(Netherlands) Tom Duivenvoorde	House of Pain	Alkmaar, Netherlands	KO (left high kick)	1	
2014-02-08	Win	(Netherlands) Marino Schouten	Fight Fans 8	Amsterdam, Netherlands	Decision	3	3:00
2013-12-01	Loss	(Morocco) Ibrahim El Bouni	Fight Fans 7	Amsterdam, Netherlands	Decision	3	3:00
2013-10-05	Win	(Netherlands) Errol Koning	Fight Fans 6	Amsterdam, Netherlands	Decision	3	3:00
2013-08-17	Loss	(Sweden) Rickard Nordstrand	Fight Night 08	Stockholm, Sweden	KO (punches)	2	1:34
2012-09-29	Loss	(Moldova) Constantin Țuțu	KOK World GP 2012 in Chișinău	Chişinău, Moldova	Decision	3	3:00
2011-10-09	Win	(Slovenia) Miran Fabjan	The Wolfpack – Never Send a Sheep To Kill a Wolf	Oostzaan, Netherlands	Decision	3	3:00
2011-06-18	Win	(Netherlands) Marino Schouten	Thaiboksgala BlokhuispoortKickboxing	Leeuwarden, Netherlands	Decision	5	3:00
2011-04-30	Win	(Switzerland) Mohamed Belkacem	Ring Rules Kickboxing	Milan, Italy	Decision	5	3:00
Wins vacant W.A.K.O. Pro K-1 Rules -85 kg World title.
2011-01-29	Win	(Netherlands) Henry Akendiz	Mejiro Gym KickBox Gala	Zaandam, Netherlands	Decision	5	3:00
2010-12-11	Loss	(Ukraine) Oleksandr Oliynyk	KOK World GP 2010 in Chișinău, Quarter-finals	Chişinău, Moldova	TKO		
2010-09-25	Win	(Morocco) Yassir Kadiri	Mejiro Gym Kickbox Gala	Zaandam, Netherlands	Decision	3	3:00
2010-01-09	Win	(Egypt) Amir Zeyada	Ring Sensation Championship: Uprising 12	Rotterdam, Netherlands	Decision	3	3:00
2010-05-29	Loss	(Morocco) L'houcine Ouzgni	It's Showtime 2010 Amsterdam	Amsterdam, Netherlands	Decision (4-1)	3	3:00
2009-11-21	Loss	(Belarus) Dmitry Shakuta	It's Showtime 2009 Barneveld	Barneveld, Netherlands	Decision	5	3:00
Fight was for Shakuta's It's Showtime 77MAX World title -77 kg.
2009-05-16	Win	(Suriname) Imro Main	It's Showtime 2009 Amsterdam	Amsterdam, Netherlands	Decision (unanimous)	3	3:00
2008-11-29	Win	(Suriname) Murthel Groenhart	It's Showtime 2008 Eindhoven	Eindhoven, Netherlands	Decision (unanimous)	3	3:00
2008-10-26	Win	(Morocco) L'houcine Ouzgni	Top Team Gala Beverwijk	Beverwijk, Netherlands	KO (high kick + punch)	5	
2008-09-06	Loss	(Belarus) Dmitry Shakuta	It's Showtime 2008 Alkmaar	Alkmaar, Netherlands	Decision	5	3:00
Fight was for inaugural It's Showtime 77MAX World title -77 kg.
2008-04-26	Win	(Brazil) Cosmo Alexandre	K-1 World GP 2008 Amsterdam, It's Showtime Reality Show '08 Final	Amsterdam, Netherlands	Decision (majority)	3	3:00
Wins It's Showtime Reality Show -75 kg.
2008-03-15	Loss	(Belarus) Dmitry Shakuta	It's Showtime 75MAX Trophy Final 2008, Semi-finals	's-Hertogenbosch, Netherlands	Decision	3	3:00
2008-03-15	Win	(Czech Republic) Jiri Zak	It's Showtime 75MAX Trophy Final 2008, Quarter-finals	's-Hertogenbosch, Netherlands	Decision	3	3:00
2007-09- 23	Win	(Egypt) Amir Zeyada	It's Showtime Reality Show '08, Semi-final	Ko Samui	Decision	3	3:00
2007-09-23	Win	(Belgium) Yassin Boudrouz	It's Showtime Reality	Ko Samui	Decision	3	3:00
2007-09-17	Win	(Italy) Marco Santi	It's Showtime Reality	Petch Buncha Stadium, Thailand	Decision	3	3:00
2007-06-30	Win	(Portugal) Tierry Mendes	W.A.K.O. Champions League	Porto, Portugal	Decision	5	3:00
Wins W.A.K.O. Pro K-1 Rules European title -80 kg.
2007-04-?	Win	(Portugal) Tierry Mendes		Portugal	TKO	3	
2007-02-02	Loss	(Morocco) Tarik Slimani	It's Showtime 75MAX Trophy Zwolle, Quarter-finals	Zwolle, Netherlands	TKO (ref. stop/punches)	1	
2006-12-15	Win	(Spain) Moises Ruibal	Lapelea Kickboxing	Tenerife, Spain	KO	2	3:00
2006-12-02	Win	(Netherlands) Henry Akdeniz	It's Showtime 2006 Alkmaar	Alkmaar, Netherlands	Decision	5	3:00
2006-11-19	Win	(Cameroon) Eric Kouman	K-1 MAX Canarias 2006, Final	Santa Cruz de Tenerife, Spain	KO (high kick)	1	
Wins K-1 MAX Canarias 2006 tournament -70 kg.
2006-11-19	Win	(Spain) Jorge Loren	K-1 MAX Canarias 2006, Semi-finals	Santa Cruz de Tenerife, Spain	TKO (low kicks)		
2006-11-19	Win	(Morocco) Tarik Slimani	K-1 MAX Canarias 2006, Quarter-finals	Santa Cruz de Tenerife, Spain	Ext.R TKO	4	
2006-09-23	Win	(Netherlands) Vincent Vielvoye	It's Showtime 75MAX Trophy Final 2006, Super Fight	Rotterdam, Netherlands	Decision	3	3:00
2006-06-18	Loss	(Suriname) Tyrone Spong	2H2H The Road To Tokyo	Amsterdam, Netherlands	KO (left hook)	3	
2006-02-12	Win	(Netherlands) Alfredo la Monte	Mauy Thai Gala in Amsterdam	Amsterdam, Netherlands	KO		
2005-12-18	Loss	(Czech Republic) Ondřej Hutník	It's Showtime 75MAX Trophy Prague, Final	Prague, Czech Republic	Decision	3	3:00
Fight was for It's Showtime 75MAX Trophy Prague Pool A Final -75 kg. Fails to qualify for It's Showtime 75MAX Trophy Final 2006.
2005-12-18	Win	(Russia) Arslan Magomedov	It's Showtime 75MAX Trophy Prague, Semi-finals	Prague, Czech Republic	Decision	3	3:00
2005-10-02	Loss	(Croatia) Emil Zoraj	It's Showtime 75MAX Trophy Tilburg, Final	Tilburg, Netherlands	Decision	3	3:00
Fight was for It's Showtime 75MAX Trophy Tilburg Pool B Final -75 kg. Fails to qualify for It's Showtime 75MAX Trophy Final 2006 although will have another chance to qualify at the Prague event.
2005-10-02	Win	(Czech Republic) Jiri Zak	It's Showtime 75MAX Trophy Tilburg, Semi-finals	Tilburg, Netherlands	Decision	3	3:00
2005-09-21	Win	(Estonia) Tarvo Rahuoja	Thaiboks-en Freefight Gala Gym Alkmaar	Schermerhorn, Netherlands	KO	2	3:00
2005-06-12	Loss	(Czech Republic) Ondřej Hutník	It's Showtime 2005 Amsterdam	Amsterdam, Netherlands	Decision	5	3:00
2005-04-23	Win	(Curaçao) Cedric Copra	Staredown, ICL Sportcentrum Landsmeer	Landsmeer, Netherlands	Decision	5	3:00
2005-02-13	Loss	(Netherlands) Joerie Mes	Muaythai in de Hoornse Vaart	Alkmaar, Netherlands	Decision (unanimous)	5	3:00
2004-12-19	Loss	(Czech Republic) Jiri Zak	Gala Landsmeer	Landsmeer, Netherlands	Decision	5	3:00
2004-10-25	Loss	(Czech Republic) Ondřej Hutník	Heaven or Hell	Prague, Czech Republic	Decision	3	3:00
2004-05-15	Win	(Belgium) W. Koning	Mejiro Gym Kickbox gala Zilvermeeuwen	Zaandam, Netherlands	Decision (unanimous)	5	3:00
2003-11-12	Win	(Armenia) Karapet Papijan	Veni, Vidi, Vici II	Veenendaal, Netherlands	Decision (unanimous)	5	2:00
Legend: Win Loss Draw/no contest Notes

== See also ==
- List of It's Showtime champions
- List of male kickboxers
