= Dmitry Shakuta =

Belarusian kickboxer

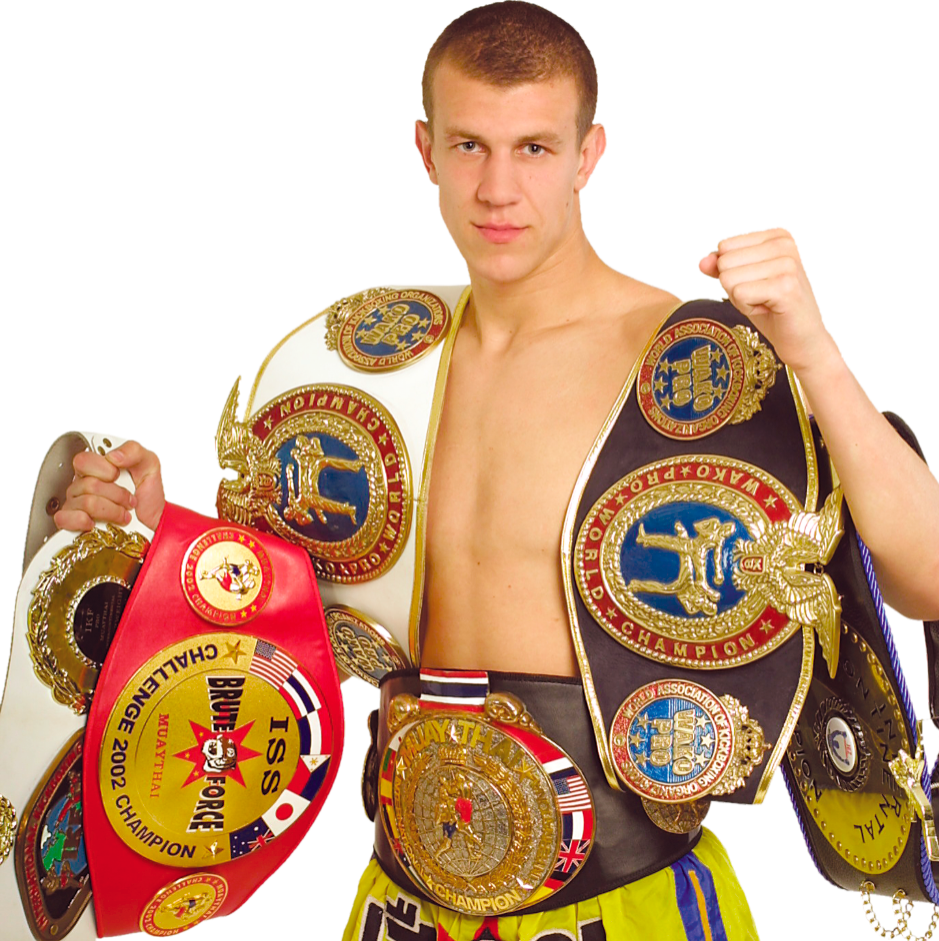
- Shakuta with his belts
- Born: Dmitry Shakuta; 7 August 1980 (age 46); Minsk, Byelorussian SSR, Soviet Union
- Native name: Дзмiтрый Віктаравіч Шакута
- Other names: Shok
- Nationality: (Belarus) Belarusian
- Height: 1.87 m (6 ft 1 1/2 in)
- Weight: 86 kg (190 lb; 13.5 st)
- Division: Welterweight; Super Welterweight; Middleweight; Super Middleweight; Light Heavyweight
- Style: Muay Thai
- Team: SK-55; Kick Fighter (1995–2002)
- Trainer: Genadi Kapshai; Evgeny Kotelnikov (1995–2002)
- Years active: 18 (1995–2013)

Kickboxing record
- Total: 91
- Wins: 78
- Losses: 13

Other information
- Website: www.shakuta.com
- Last updated on: 28 February 2017

Dmitry "Shok" Shakuta (Belarusian: Дзмiтрый Віктаравіч Шакута; born 7 August 1980) is a Belarusian Muay Thai super middleweight kickboxer fighting out of Minsk, Belarus, for the SK-55 gym. He is an eight-time amateur and professional world champion, most well known for being the It's Showtime 77MAX world champion between 2008 and 2009.

On 16 November 2020, the Ministry of Foreign Affairs of Latvia imposed a travel ban against Shakuta ‘for an unspecified period’ due to his alleged involvement in the killing of peaceful protester Raman Bandarenka. Several sportspeople have previously identified him in photos and videos of the masked persons who attacked Bandarenka. Shakuta has refused to comment on the suspicions. In the same month, Estonia also imposed a travel ban against Shakuta. On 9 August 2021, Shakuta and his sports club were added to the SDN list by the United States Department of Treasury.

== Life and career ==
Born in Minsk, Byelorussian SSR, Soviet Union, one of the strongest nations in Muay Thai practice worldwide, Dmitry started training in the sport at the age of 12 at the renowned Kick Fighter Gym under the tutelage of Evgeni Kotelnikov. He had his first competitive bout(s) at the age of 13 at the 1995 C.I.S. Junior Muaythai Championships, winning a silver medal at the event held in Odesa, Ukraine. Between 1995 and 1997, he continued to excel in amateur youth competitions both domestically and internationally, with the pinnacle being the winning of a gold medal at the W.A.K.O. world junior championships in '97. His success at the junior level was mirrored in the adult amateur scene as Dmitry won more gold medals between 1997 and 2000, including three world championships and four European championships.

After success on the amateur circuit Shakuta decided to test himself in the professional game winning his first title - the IKF International Kickboxing Federation Intercontinental Muay Thai Title on January, 14th, 2000 in Minsk, Belarus when he defeated Fernando Calleros of Albuquerque, New Mexico, United States, by unanimous decision.

Shakuta challenged for the IKF International Kickboxing Federation Pro Muay Thai Junior Middleweight World title against Kongnapa on 26 February 2000, in Milwaukee, Wisconsin, United States. Kongnapa defeated Shakuta in a VERY CLOSE Majority decision, 48–46, 48-46 and 47-47.

He eventually won the IKF International Kickboxing Federation Pro Muay Thai Rules Super Welterweight World title when he defeated Pramuenrit Sithsaeng-a- run of Thailand by KO in Novosibirsk, Russia on 29 June 2000.

He later claimed his second pro title (this time with W.A.K.O. leading him to be named the 2000 "IKF All Around Pro Fighter Of The Year". Dmitry would continue to win titles at both amateur and professional level between 2002 and 2004, picking up three pro world titles and four gold medals in world and European championships also switching gyms in 2002 to join SK-55. In 2003 he signed with the newly formed Thai & Kickbox SuperLeague organization and won his promotional debut at the SuperLeague Germany 2003 event easily defeating opponent Joe White. Involvement with SuperLeague meant that Dmitry could regularly fight against some of the world's top fighters and over the three years he was with the organization until its demise in 2006 he would post an excellent six and one record with wins against the likes of Joerie Mes, Clifton Brown and Shane Chapman only being tempered by a surprise KO loss to Moises Baptista De Sousa.

After SuperLeague ceased to exist Shakuta's record meant that he would be snapped up by the up-and-coming Dutch promotion It's Showtime and he won his debut – a four-man tournament – with the organization early 2006. This victory meant he qualified for the organizations inaugural 75MAX tournament later that year in Rotterdam, although he did not go far after being beaten by Ondřej Hutník in the quarter-finals. In 2008 after having won a qualifying fight the previous year Dmitry found himself back at the final. This time he went all the way beating a strong line of competitors in Rayen Simson, Sem Braan and Gregory Choplin to emerge victorious, with the victory against his early idol Simson being particularly sweet. Later that year the winner of the 75MAX trophy and the winner of It's Showtime Reality Show faced off in Alkmaar with Dmitry defeating Sem Braan over five rounds to become the first 77MAX world champion.

Over the next couple of years Dmitry would successfully defend his 77MAX world title before losing it in early 2010 to Cosmo Alexandre. He would also make a successful return to amateur competition winning a gold medal at the 2008 Busan TAFISA World Games. He is currently competing in the Tatneft Arena cup in Russia and has not fought with the It's Showtime organization since losing his world title.

Shakuta defeated Sergei Papusha by unanimous decision at Mustang Knock Out Fight Night in Minsk, Belarus on 18 November 2012.

He moved up to 86 kg and lost on points to Suleyman Magomedov over five, two-minute rounds at the R-1 event in Rostov-on-Don, Russia, on 23 March 2013.

== Titles ==
- Professional:
  - 2011 W5 World Champion -81 kg.
  - 2009 It's Showtime 77MAX world champion -77 kg (2nd title defence)
  - 2009 It's Showtime 77MAX world champion -77 kg (1st title defence)
  - 2008 It's Showtime 77MAX world champion -77 kg
  - 2008 It's Showtime Trophy Final champion -75 kg
  - 2006 It's Showtime 75MAX Trophy Belgium Pool B winner -75 kg
  - 2004 W.P.K.L. Muaythai World title -76.2 kg
  - 2002 World Kickboxing Network (W.K.N.) Muaythai World champion -76.2 kg
  - 2002 ISS/Brute Force World champion
  - 2000 W.A.K.O Pro World champion
  - 2000 I.K.F. Pro Muaythai Super-welterweight World title
  - 2000 I.K.F. Pro Muaythai Welterweight Intercontinental title - first pro title.
- Amateur:
  - 2008 Busan TAFISA World Games I.F.M.A. Amateur Muaythai (gold) -81 kg
  - 2002 W.A.K.O. European Championships Jesolo, Italy (gold) -75 kg (Thai-boxing)
  - 2002 I.A.M.T.F. European championships Cyprus (gold) -75 kg
  - 2001 W.A.K.O. World Championships in Belgrade, Serbia and Montenegro (gold) -75 kg (Thai-boxing)
  - 2001 I.A.M.T.F. World Muaythai Championships, Bangkok Thailand (gold) -75 kg
  - 2000 World Cup in Martial Arts Sydney, Australia (gold) -71 kg
  - 2000 I.A.M.T.F. Muaythai European Championships, Athens, Greece (gold) -71 kg
  - 1999 W.A.K.O. World Championships Caorle, Italy (gold) -71 kg (Thai-boxing)
  - 1999 I.A.M.T.F. World Muaythai Championships, Bangkok Thailand (silver) -60 kg
  - 1998 W.A.K.O. Kickboxing European Championships, Kyiv, Ukraine (gold) -60 kg
  - 1998 I.A.M.T.F. Muaythai European Championships, Kalafel, Spain (gold) -57 kg
  - 1997 W.P.K.L. European championships Italy (gold) -54 kg
  - 1997 W.A.K.O. World Junior Championships, Moscow Russia (gold) -54 kg (Full-Contact)
  - 1997 World Muaythai Championships, Bangkok Thailand (bronze) -51 kg
  - 1995 CIS Junior Muaythai Championships, Odesa Ukraine (silver) -42 kg

== Fight record ==
Professional Muay Thai & Kickboxing record
78 Wins (28 (T)KO's, 49 decisions), 13 Losses (3 (T)KO's, 7 decisions)
Date	Result	Opponent	Event	Location	Method	Round	Time
2013-09-28	Loss	(Moldova) Constantin Țuțu	KOK World GP 2013 in Chișinău, Super Fight	Chișinău, Moldova	Extra round decision	4	3:00
2013-03-23	Loss	(Russia) Suleyman Magomedov	R-1 - Fights Time	Rostov-on-Don, Russia	Decision	5	2:00
Fight was for R-1 86 kg World title
2012-11-18	Win	(Ukraine) Sergei Papusha	Mustang Knock Out Fight Night	Minsk, Belarus	Decision (unanimous)	3	3:00
2012-04-14	Win	(Ukraine) Igor Lyapin	Fight Code	Minsk, Belarus	Decision (unanimous)	3	3:00
2011-12-18	Win	(Moldova) Dinu Pocrîşchin		Minsk, Belarus	Decision	3	3:00
2011-11-12	Loss	(Ukraine) Alexander Oleinik	Tatneft Cup 2011 Final	Kazan, Russia	Decision (Unanimous)	3	3:00
2011-10-20	Win	(Russia) Alexander Stetsurenko	W5	Krasnodar, Russia	Decision	3	3:00
Wins W5 World Title -81 kg.
2011-07-23	Win	(Bulgaria) Yordan Yankov	Tatneft Cup 2011 1/2-final (80 kg)	Kazan, Russia	Decision	4	3:00
2011-05-28	Win	(Brazil) Alex Sandro Alves	Tatneft Cup 2011 1/4-final (80 kg)	Kazan, Russia	Decision (Unanimous)	4	3:00
2011-02-12	Win	(Latvia) Artem Mirovcev	Tatneft Cup 2011 1/8-final (80 kg)	Kazan, Russia	TKO (Shoulder injury)	1	
2010-05-29	Win	(Poland) Rafal Petertil	Angels of Fire VII	Płock, Poland	KO (Flying Knee)	2	
2010-03-13	Loss	(Brazil) Cosmo Alexandre	Oktagon presents: It's Showtime 2010	Milan, Italy	TKO (Doc. stop/cut by knees)	2	
Lost his It's Showtime 77MAX title.
2009-11-21	Win	(Netherlands) Sem Braan	It's Showtime 2009 Barneveld	Barneveld, Netherlands	Decision (Unanimous)	5	3:00
Retains It's Showtime 77MAX title (2nd defence).
2009-09-26	Loss	(Russia) Artem Levin	Tatneft Arena European Cup 2009 1/2-final (80 kg)	Kazan, Russia	KO (Left spinning backfist)	4	2:08
2009-08-29	Win	(France) Gregory Choplin	It's Showtime 2009 Budapest	Budapest, Hungary	Decision	5	3:00
Retains It's Showtime 77MAX title (1st defence).
2009-05-26	Win	(Russia) Valentin Semenov	Tatneft Arena European Cup 2009 1/4-final (80 kg)	Kazan, Russia	Ext.R Decision (Unanimous)	4	3:00
2009-02-19	Win	(Russia) Alexey Kunchenko	Tatneft Arena European Cup 2009 1/8-final (80 kg)	Kazan, Russia	Ext.R Decision (Unanimous)	4	3:00
2008-11-01	Loss	(Thailand) Wehaj Kingboxing	Ringmaster Olimpia Tournament, semi final (82 kg)	Istanbul, Turkey	Decision	3	3:00
2008-09-05	Win	(Netherlands) Sem Braan	It's Showtime 2008 Alkmaar	Alkmaar, Netherlands	Decision	5	3:00
Wins It's Showtime 77MAX title.
2008-04-12	Win	(Italy) Roberto Cocco	K-1 Italy Oktagon 2008	Milan, Italy	Decision	3	3:00
2008-03-15	Win	(France) Gregory Choplin	It's Showtime 75MAX Trophy 2008, Final	's-Hertogenbosch, Netherlands	Decision	3	3:00
Wins It's Showtime Trophy 75MAX title.
2008-03-15	Win	(Netherlands) Sem Braan	It's Showtime 75MAX Trophy 2008, Semi-finals	's-Hertogenbosch, Netherlands	Decision	3	3:00
2008-03-15	Win	(Suriname) Rayen Simson	It's Showtime 75MAX Trophy 2008, Quarter-finals	's-Hertogenbosch, Netherlands	Decision	3	3:00
2007-06-02	Loss	(Suriname) Tyrone Spong	Gentleman Fight Night IV	Tilburg, Netherlands	Decision	5	3:00
2007-03-24	Win	(France) Morad Sari	It's Showtime Trophy 2007	Lommel, Belgium	Decision	3	3:00
Qualifies for It's Showtime 75MAX Trophy 2008.
2006-09-23	Loss	(Czech Republic) Ondřej Hutník	It's Showtime 75MAX Trophy Final 2006, Quarter-finals	Rotterdam, Netherlands	Decision	3	3:00
2006-05-13	Win	(New Zealand) Shane Chapman	SuperLeague Elimination 2006	Vienna, Austria	Decision	3	3:00
2006-02-18	Win	(Turkey) Yücel Fidan	It's Showtime 75MAX Trophy Belgium, Pool B Final	Mortsel, Belgium	Decision	3	3:00
Qualifies for It's Showtime 75MAX Trophy Final 2006.
2006-02-18	Win	(Belgium) Jan de Keyzer	It's Showtime 75MAX Trophy Belgium, Pool B Semi-finals	Mortsel, Belgium	TKO	1	
2006-01-28	Win	(Italy) Roberto Cocco	SuperLeague Hungary 2006	Budapest, Hungary	Decision (Unanimous)	3	3:00
2005-10-22	Win	(Croatia) Emil Zoraj	SuperLeague Heavy Knockout 2005	Vienna, Austria	Decision	3	3:00
2005-09-30	Win	(France) Yohan Lidon	Kings of Muaythai: Belarus vs Europe	Minsk, Belarus	Decision	5	3:00
2005-05-21	Win	(Canada) Clifton Brown	SuperLeague Germany 2005	Oberhausen, Germany	Decision (Split)	5	3:00
2005-04-09	Loss	(Brazil) Moises Baptista De Sousa	SuperLeague Austria 2005	Vienna, Austria	KO (Punches)	1	
2004-05-22	Win	(Czech Republic) Jiri Zak	SuperLeague Switzerland 2004	Winterthur, Switzerland	Decision	5	3:00
2004-05-04	Win	(Russia) Mikhail Chalykh	Kristall Cup	Moscow, Russia	Decision (split)		
2004-03-27	Win	(Suriname) Ashwin Balrak	WPKL Muay Thai Champions League XII	Rotterdam, Netherlands	Decision	5	3:00
Wins W.P.K.L. Muaythai World title (-76.2 kg).
2003-12-06	Win	(Netherlands) Joerie Mes	SuperLeague Netherlands 2003	Rotterdam, Netherlands	KO (Right high kick)	2	2:19
2003-09-27	Win	(New Zealand) Joe White	SuperLeague Germany 2003	Wuppertal, Germany	Decision	5	3:00
2003-06-18	Loss	(Russia) Magomed Magomedov	WBKF Superfights @ Club Arbat	Moscow, Russia	Decision	5	3:00
2003-03-19	Win	(Belarus) Zabit Samedov	BARS - Cup of Arbat Finals	Moscow, Russia	Decision	5	3:00
Wins "Cup of Arbat" Tournament title (-76 kg).
2003-03-12	Win	(Russia) Vladimir Todorov	BARS - Cup of Arbat Semifinals	Moscow, Russia			
2003-03-06	Win	(Belarus) Alexei Kharkevich	BARS - Cup of Arbat Quarterfinals	Moscow, Russia			
2002-12-19	Win	(Ukraine) Nikolai Kovalchuk	Belarus vs Ukraine	Bilohirsk, Ukraine	Decision	5	3:00
2002-09-14	Win	(Czech Republic) Jan Sláma	Night of KO	Sopot, Poland	TKO	5	3:00
Wins W.K.N. Muaythai World title -76.2 kg.
2002-07-06	Loss	(France) Morad Sari	Le Grand Tournoi Quarter-final	Paris, France	Decision		3:00
2002-03-04	Win	(France) Riad Rekhis	Champions League VI	Rotterdam, Netherlands	Ext. R Decision	4	3:00
Qualifies for Le Grand Tournoi.
2002-03-04	Win	(Netherlands) Chris van Venrooij	Champions League VI	Rotterdam, Netherlands	Decision	3	3:00
2002-00-00	Win	(United States)	WKA: BELARUS vs USA	New York City, United States			
2002-00-00	Win	(Thailand) Rodtung Wor-Taveekeat	Brute Force Challenge	Pattaya, Thailand	Decision	5	3:00
Wins I.S.S/Brute Force Muaythai world title.
2001-05-19	Win	(United Kingdom) Winston Walker		Milan, Italy	Decision	5	3:00
Wins W.A.K.O. Pro World title.
2000-11-11	Loss	(Thailand) Pajonsuk Lookprabaht	Thailand vs Belarus	Bangkok, Thailand	Decision	5	3:00
2000-00-00	Win	(Australia)	Belarus vs Australia	Sydney, Australia	KO		
2000-00-00	Win	(United Kingdom) Nathan Keith		Trieste, Italy			
Wins W.A.K.O. Pro Muaythai World title.
2000-06-29	Win	(Thailand) Pramuenrit Sithsaengarun	Russia vs Thailand	Novosibirsk, Russia	KO		
Wins I.K.F. Pro Muaythai Super-welterweight World title.
2000-00-00	Win	(Thailand) Lerdpipop Saengvan	Belarus vs Thailand	Minsk, Belarus	KO		
2000-02-26	Loss	(Thailand) Kongnapa Watcharawit		Milwaukee, United States	Decision (Majority)	5	3:00
Fight was for I.K.F. Pro Muaythai Junior-middleweight World title.
2000-01-14	Win	(United States) Fernando Calleros	USA vs Belarus	Minsk, Belarus	Decision	5	3:00
Wins I.K.F. Pro Muaythai Welterweight Intercontinental title.
Legend: Win Loss Draw/No contest Notes

Amateur record
Date	Result	Opponent	Event	Location	Method	Round	Time
2008-10-03	Win	(Ukraine) Dmitro Kirpan	4th Busan TAFISA World Games, final	Busan, South Korea	Decision	4	2:00
Wins 4th Busan TAFISA World Games 81kg gold medal.
2008-09-30	Win	(Bulgaria) Yordan Yankov	4th Busan TAFISA World Games, 1/2 final	Busan, South Korea	Decision	4	2:00
2008-09-29	Win	(Iran) Nima Maijidi	4th Busan TAFISA World Games, 1/4 final	Busan, South Korea	KO		
2008-09-27	Win	(Poland) Marcin Tomczyk	4th Busan TAFISA World Games, 1/8 final	Busan, South Korea	Decision	4	2:00
Legend: Win Loss Draw/No contest Notes

== See also ==
- List of K-1 events
- List of It's Showtime champions
- List of male kickboxers
