= It's Showtime 2012 in Leeuwarden =

Showtime kickboxing event in 2012

- Promotion: It's Showtime
- Date: January 28, 2012
- Venue: WTC Expo
- City: Leeuwarden, Netherlands
- Attendance: 5,000

Event chronology
It's Showtime Japan VII	It's Showtime 2012 in Leeuwarden	It's Showtime 56

It's Showtime 2012 in Leeuwarden or It's Showtime 54 & 55 was a kickboxing event held on January 28, 2012, at the WTC Expo in Leeuwarden, Netherlands.

== Background ==
The event featured world title fight for It's Showtime World Heavyweight Championship of Hesdy Gerges vs. Daniel Ghiță, world title fight for It's Showtime World 73MAX Championship of Yohan Lidon vs. L'houcine Ouzgni and the last fight of Badr Hari vs. Gökhan Saki.

== Results ==
Part 2
Weight Class				Method	Round	Time	Notes
Heavyweight	(Morocco) Badr Hari	def.	(Turkey) Gökhan Saki	TKO (referee stoppage/3 knockdowns)	1	2:44	Badr Hari's Retirement Fight
Heavyweight	(Romania) Daniel Ghiță	def.	(Netherlands) Hesdy Gerges (c)	KO (left hook)	1	2:47	For the It's Showtime World Heavyweight Championship
70MAX	(Netherlands) Robin van Roosmalen	def.	(Turkey) Murat Direkçi	Decision (majority)	3	3:00
Heavyweight	(Curaçao) Errol Zimmerman	def.	(Netherlands) Rico Verhoeven	KO (left hook)	1	0:59
70MAX	(Armenia) Harut Grigorian	def.	(Democratic Republic of the Congo) Chris Ngimbi	TKO (doctor stoppage/cut)	2	1:22
Heavyweight	(Brazil) Anderson Silva	def.	(Netherlands) Michael Duut	Decision (unanimous)	3	3:00
Part 1
Heavyweight	(Suriname) Tyrone Spong	def.	(Netherlands) Melvin Manhoef	Decision (unanimous)	3	3:00
73MAX	(Morocco) L'houcine Ouzgni	def.	(France) Yohan Lidon (c)	Decision (unanimous)	3	3:00	For the It's Showtime World 73MAX Championship
Heavyweight	(Australia) Ben Edwards	def.	(Netherlands) Ricardo van den Bos	Decision (unanimous)	3	3:00
95MAX	(Armenia) Sahak Parparyan	def.	(Tunisia) Mourad Bouzidi	Decision (unanimous)	3	3:00
70MAX	(Suriname) Andy Ristie	def.	(Japan) Hinata Watanabe	TKO (referee stoppage/3 knockdowns)	1	2:31
70MAX	(Morocco) Hafid El Boustati	def.	(Netherlands) Henri van Opstal	Decision (unanimous)	3	3:00
