= Hutnik =

Hutnik means metallurgist in Polish and Czech languages, and may refer to:

- Hutnik Nowa Huta, a Polish football club
- Hutnik Warszawa, a Polish football club
- Ondřej Hutník (born 1983), Czech Muay Thai kickboxer
