= Amir Zeyada =

- Born: February 15, 1984 (age 42)
- Other names: The Sphinx
- Nationality: Egyptian; Dutch
- Height: 1.82 m (5 ft 11 1/2 in)
- Weight: 85 kg (187 lb; 13.4 st)
- Division: Cruiserweight; Light Heavyweight; Super Middleweight; Middleweight
- Style: Muay Thai
- Stance: Orthodox
- Fighting out of: Amsterdam, Netherlands
- Team: Chakuriki Gym
- Trainer: Thom Harinck

Kickboxing record
- Total: 72
- Wins: 51
- Losses: 19
- Draws: 2
- Last updated on: November 12, 2011

Amir "The Sphinx" Zeyada (born February 15, 1984) is an Egyptian-Dutch cruiserweight Muay Thai kickboxer currently fighting out of the Chakuriki Gym in Amsterdam, Netherlands, where he is trained by Thom Harinck. He is a former Dutch national champion who originally started fighting as a middleweight. Zeyada holds two notable knockout victories over the highly rated Tyrone Spong. He's the former runner up for the It's Showtime 85MAX Championship. In 2010 the Dutch rankings placed Zeyada as the number one 79 kg fighter.

== Biography/Career ==
Amir started off fighting at C and B-Klass level in the Netherlands. He got his first major victory when he faced fellow prospect (and future multiple world champion) Tyrone Spong in 2002, defeating the young Spong in somewhat bizarre fashion, with Spong knocking himself out after slamming Zeyada to the floor after a clinch. In 2005 Amir would win his first title, defeating Abder Bechiri in Zaandam to win the World Kickboxing Network (W.K.N.) Dutch title by knockout in the first round.

As Dutch champion, Zeyada was signed to the newly created SuperLeague, a European-based promotion which aimed to bring highly competitive fights to the continent, potentially rivaling K-1, which would give Amir the chance to fight some of the top kickboxers in the world. He won his first match with the organization outclassing French champion Karim Aliouane on his debut at SuperLeague Portugal 2005 to win via decision. Despite the promising opening, Zeyada would have limited success within SuperLeague, finishing with a losing record of two wins and three defeats by the time of the organizations demise in 2006.

After the demise of SuperLeague, Amir made his debut with the blossoming It's Showtime organization at the start of 2007, taking part in an eight-man preliminary tournament in Zwolle, where he made the semi-finals only to lose to eventual winner Karapet Papijan. The next month he had a long-awaited rematch against Tyrone Spong at a Rings event in Utrecht. Amir had defeated Spong back in 2002 at B-Klass level but Spong was now far more experienced fighter, and a European and world champion to boot. Tyrone dominated Amir for the first two rounds of their match getting a knockdown in the second and being far the superior fighter. However, Amir came back in the third knocking Spong down with a huge left hand and swarmed the pre-match favourite, knocking him down again en route to a TKO victory.

Since the second Spong victory Amir's career has failed to really take off, losing a Dutch title fight on his K-1 debut and making an unsuccessful bid for the World Full Contact Association (W.F.C.A.) European title against holder Imro Main in 2008 as he has moved up through the divisions. In 2010 he had a shot at the vacant 76 kg E.M.T.A. European title, losing to Murthel Groenhart by TKO. In 2011 he had arguably his biggest fight to date, showing great heart but ultimately coming up short in a five-round battle against Sahak Parparyan for the vacant It's Showtime 85MAX world title.

Zeyada defeated Moises Ruibal in 2011 and 2012, then lost to Bogdan Stoica by first-round knockout at SUPERKOMBAT World Grand Prix IV 2013 in Giurgiu, Romania on October 12.

== Titles ==
- 2005 World Kickboxing Network Dutch national champion

== Kickboxing record(incomplete) ==
Kickboxing Record
51 Wins , 19 Losses, 2 Draws
| Date | Result | Opponent | Event | Location | Method | Round | Time |
| 2013-10-12 | Loss | (Romania) Bogdan Stoica | SUPERKOMBAT World Grand Prix IV 2013 | Giurgiu, Romania | KO (left hook) | 1 | |
| 2012-07-21 | Win | (Spain) Moises Ruibal | It's Showtime 59 | Spain | Decision | 3 | 3:00 |
| 2011-11-12 | Win | (Spain) Moises Ruibal | It's Showtime 53 | Tenerife, Spain | TKO (referee stoppage) | 3 | 2:53 |
| 2011-05-21 | Loss | (Armenia) Sahak Parparyan | Fightclub presents: It's Showtime 2011 | Amsterdam, Netherlands | Decision (Majority) | 5 | 3:00 |
Fight was for vacant It's Showtime 85MAX world title -85 kg.
| 2010-02-27 | Loss | (Suriname) Murthel Groenhart | Amsterdam Fight Club 3 | Amsterdam, Netherlands | TKO (Doc Stop/Cut) | 1 | |
Fight was for vacant E.M.T.A. K-1 rules European title -76 kg.
| 2010-01-09 | Loss | (Netherlands) Sem Braan | Ring Sensation Championship: Uprising 12 | Rotterdam, Netherlands | Decision | 3 | 3:00 |
| 2009-10-25 | Loss | (Morocco) L'houcine Ouzgni | Top Team Beverwijk Gala | Beverwijk, Netherlands | Decision | 3 | 3:00 |
| 2009-05-31 | Loss | (Morocco) Khalid Bourdif | Next Generation Warriors 3 | Amsterdam, Netherlands | Decision | 3 | 3:00 |
| 2009-04-11 | Win | (Netherlands) Jamie de Vries | Amsterdam Fight Club 2 | Amsterdam, Netherlands | Decision | 3 | 3:00 |
| 2009-03-01 | Loss | (Morocco) Khalid Chabrani | K-1 World MAX 2009 Europe, Title Fight | Utrecht, Netherlands | Decision (Unanimous) | 5 | 3:00 |
Fight was for vacant N.K.B.B. Dutch title -76 kg.
| 2008 | Loss | (Netherlands) Sem Braan | It's Showtime Reality Show '08, Semi-final | Koh Samui, Thailand | Decision | 3 | 3:00 |
| 2008 | Win | (Portugal) Florin Vintilla | It's Showtime Reality Show '08 | Koh Samui, Thailand | Decision | 3 | 3:00 |
| 2008 | Win | (Morocco) Issaoui Halim | It's Showtime Reality Show '08 | Koh Samui, Thailand | Decision | 3 | 3:00 |
| 2008-07-05 | Loss | (Suriname) Imro Main | Amsterdam Fight Club | Amsterdam, Netherlands | KO (Knees) | 2 | |
Fight was for Main's W.F.C.A. light heavyweight European title -79.38 kg.
| 2007-06-02 | Loss | (Turkey) Yücel Fidan | Gentleman Fight Night Tilburg | Tilburg, Netherlands | KO (Punches) | 5 | |
| 2007-04-29 | Loss | (Thailand) Pajonsuk | Beatdown Gala | Amsterdam, Netherlands | Decision | 5 | 3:00 |
| 2007-03-25 | Win | (Suriname) Tyrone Spong | Rings Gala, Vechtsenbanen | Utrecht, Netherlands | TKO (Ref Stop/Punches) | 3 | 1:49 |
| 2007-02-02 | Loss | (Armenia) Karapet Papijan | It's Showtime 75MAX Trophy Zwolle, Semi-final | Zwolle, Netherlands | Decision | 3 | 3:00 |
| 2007-02-02 | Win | (Netherlands) Ruben van der Giessen | It's Showtime 75MAX Trophy Zwolle, Quarter-final | Zwolle, Netherlands | Decision | 3 | 3:00 |
| 2006-05-13 | Loss | (Portugal) José Reis | SuperLeague Elimination 2006, Semi-final | Vienna, Austria | Decision | 3 | 3:00 |
| 2006-05-13 | Win | (Morocco) Hamid Boujaoub | SuperLeague Elimination 2006, Quarter-final | Vienna, Austria | TKO (Corner Stop/Leg Injury) | 2 | 3:00 |
| 2006-03-11 | Loss | (New Zealand) Jordan Tai | SuperLeague Apocalypse 2006 | Paris, France | TKO (Ref Stop/Punches) | 2 | |
| 2006-01-28 | Loss | (Hungary) István Tóth | SuperLeague Hungary 2006 | Budapest, Hungary | Decision (Unanimous) | 3 | 3:00 |
| 2005-12-11 | Loss | (Suriname) Imro Main | Rings Fight Gala, Semi-final | Utrecht, Netherlands | Decision | 3 | 3:00 |
| 2005-11-19 | Win | (France) Karim Aliouane | SuperLeague Portugal 2005 | Carcavelos, Portugal | Decision (Unanimous) | 3 | 3:00 |
| 2005-06-26 | Win | (Morocco) Abder Bechiri | Day of the Panther | Zaandam, Netherlands | KO | 1 | |
Wins W.K.N. Dutch national title.
| 2005-04-03 | Loss | (Suriname) Rayen Simson | Rings Muay Thai Gala | Utrecht, Netherlands | TKO (Corner Stop/Towel) | 5 | |
| 2004-12-12 | Win | (Netherlands) Melvin Rozenblad | Free Fight Event XX | Utrecht, Netherlands | TKO (Low Kicks) | 2 | |
| 2004-10-10 | Loss | (Armenia) Gago Drago | 2 Hot 2 Handle | Rotterdam, Netherlands | Decision (Unanimous) | 5 | 3:00 |
| 2004-06-? | Draw | (Morocco) Youssef Aknikh | | Netherlands | Decision Draw | 5 | 3:00 |
| 2004-04-04 | Loss | (Netherlands) Benito Caupain | Rings Gala Utrecht | Utrecht, Netherlands | KO (Left Hook) | 5 | |
| 2003-11-30 | Win | (Netherlands) Cedric Bacuna | Killerdome IV | Amsterdam, Netherlands | TKO (Ref Stop/2 Knockdowns) | 1 | |
| 2003-02-02 | Win | (Netherlands) Melvin Rozenblad | Killerdome II | Amsterdam, Netherlands | KO (Right Punch) | 2 | |
| 2002-06-21 | Win | (Morocco) Karim El Assati | Zonnehuis Gala | Amsterdam, Netherlands | KO (Low kick) | 4 | |
| 2002-05-19 | Win | (Suriname) Tyrone Spong | Itai-Te Promotions, Thaiboksgala Predators III | Amsterdam, Netherlands | KO (Slam) | 4 | 0:47 |
Legend: Win Loss Draw/No contest Notes

== See also ==
- List of It's Showtime events
- List of It's Showtime champions
- List of male kickboxers
