= Mikhail Chalykh =

Russian kickboxer

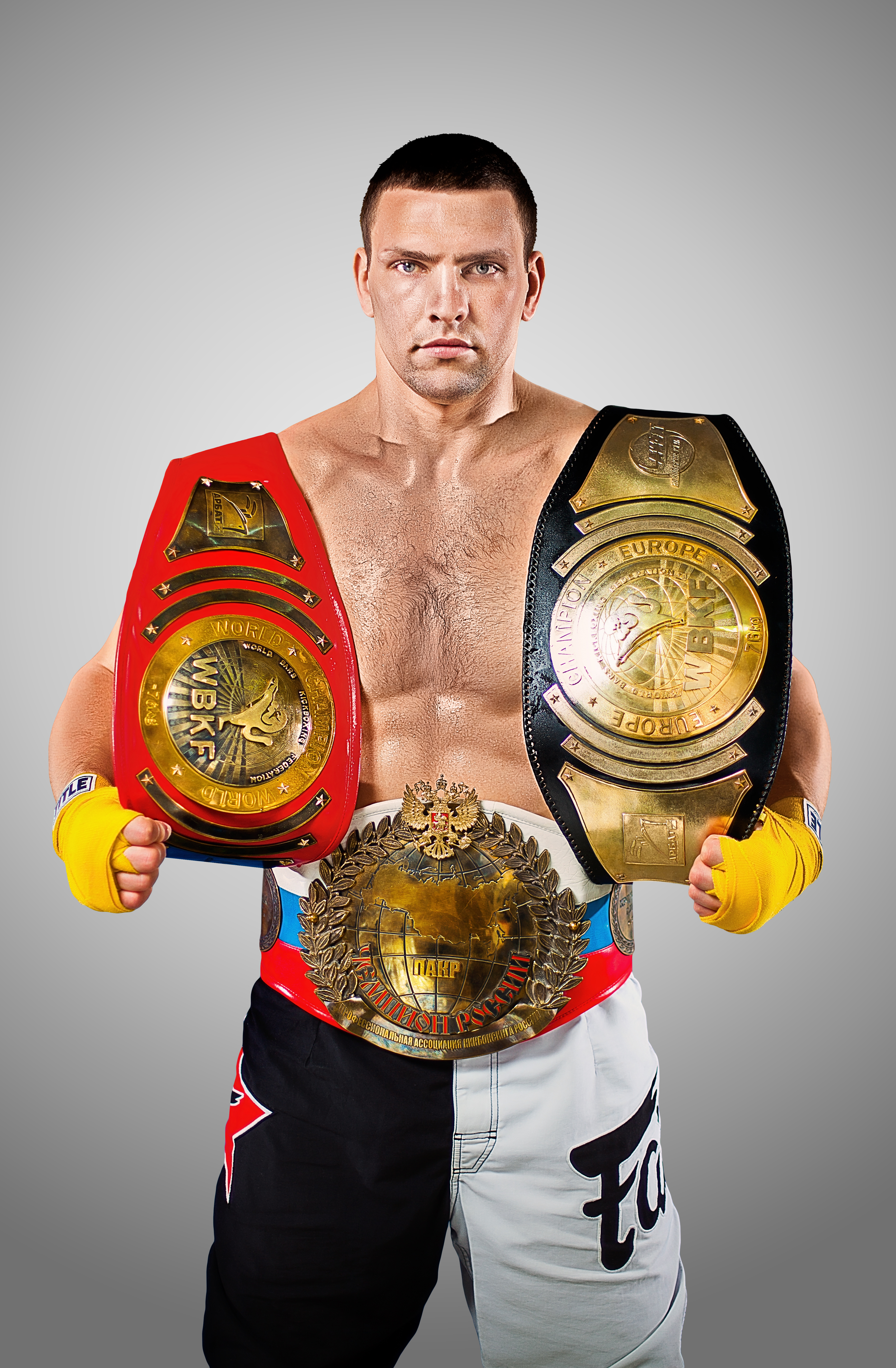
- Chalykh in 2013
- Born: Михаи́л Ви́кторович Ча́лых; November 20, 1983 (age 42); Volgograd, Russian SFSR, Soviet Union
- Nationality: Russian
- Height: 1.90 m (6 ft 3 in)
- Weight: 85 kg (187 lb; 13.4 st)
- Division: Welterweight; Middleweight; Light Heavyweight
- Style: Kickboxing
- Stance: Orthodox
- Fighting out of: Russia
- Years active: 2002 - 2007; 2011; 2014 - 2018

Kickboxing record
- Total: 23
- Wins: 19
- By knockout: 6
- Losses: 4
- By knockout: 1
- Last updated on: November 8, 2020

Mikhail Viktorovich Chalykh — (/mɪˈhaɪl ˈtʃʌlɪx/; Russian: Михаи́л Ви́кторович Ча́лых; born November 20, 1983) is a retired Russian kickboxer. He is a Merited Master of Sports in kickboxing as well as a World Champion (2006), a European Champion (2004) and a three-time Russian National Champion in kickboxing (2004, 2005 and 2007).

== Early life ==
Chalykh was born in Volgograd. At 16 years old, his childhood friend and future promoter, Maxim Voronov, introduced Chalykh to kickboxing at the gym of Viktor Petrovich Tuliev.

== Career ==
=== Professional ===
Chalykh started his professional career in 2004 and up until his first retirement in late 2007, he had only lost once in a close decision against Kickboxing legend, Dmitry Shakuta. Over his short professional career, he won the National WBKF (World BARS Kickboxing Federation) title three times. Additionally, in December, 2004, Chalykh knocked out two-time French National Champion in Kickboxing and Savate, Sylvio Danois for the WBKF European title. His most notable career wins came against WAKO World Full-Contact Champion Denis Grachev, Kickboxing and Muay Thai legend, Artem Levin, and Kickboxing legend, Artur Kyshenko.

==== WBKF World Championship ====
In 2006, the WBKF organized a one-night 4-man tournament consisting of the best -76 kg fighters under their banner to fight for the WBKF World Championship. In the first round, Russian kickboxing great, WBKF Eurasian Champion, Vladimir Tyuin beat WAKO World Champion and WBKF Eurasian Champion, Kyrgyz, Katanbek Sydygaliev by unanimous decision. On the other side of the bracket, Chalykh beat two-time Ukrainian National Muay Thai Champion and 2006 I.F.M.A. World Championship gold medalist, Artur Kyshenko by split decision.

In the Final of the tournament, despite losing the first round, Chalykh came back from behind in the last round to win, again, by split decision. He had won his first, and only professional World title of his career.

=== Amateur ===
As an amateur, Chalykh was a two-time World Champion (2002, 2005), a European Champion (2004) and four-time Russian National Champion (2002, 2006, 2007, 2011). His most notable tournament was in the 2005 World Championships where he beat L'houcine Ouzgni and Yuri Karbechou, whom he would lose to in the Final of the next European Tournament (2006), for the gold medal.

=== Retirement ===
At the end of the year of 2007, after beating Draženko Ninić, Chalykh retired at 24 years old, with a record of 18–1, reportedly due to knee injuries.

=== Comebacks ===
==== 2011 WAKO Russian National Tournament ====
After four years away from the ring, Chalykh came back to compete in the WAKO Russian National Tournament heavier than he had ever been, at 81 kg. He stated that during his time off, he had healed his knees and fixed a tooth. According to himself, Chalykh started training for the tournament just three months before. He ran through his competition with relative ease and beat Murat Talipov in the Final to win his fourth amateur National title and last title amateur or professional.

==== Late career comebacks ====
In 2014, Chalykh participated in the Amateur Volgograd Kickboxing Open, it was his first fight after over two years away from the sport.

In 2015, eight years after his last professional fight, at 31 years old, Chalykh decided to make his comeback heavier than he'd ever been at 85 kg against Moroccan, Samir Boukhidous on the undercard of Glory 20: Dubai. He lost by TKO in round 1 after getting knocked down twice.

After this, he returned to the Amateur ranks where he participated in the National Tournament. He went 2–1 in the tournament, losing his third fight by, reportedly, controversial decision. Chalykh decided to sit out 2016 and not go to the World Championships.

Two years after his last professional comeback, at 33 years old, Chalykh attempted another one as he had stated that he wants to fight in GLORY again. He was scheduled to face Filip Verlinden who had just challenged for the Enfusion Middleweight (85 kg) title. Chalykh won by unanimous decision. This was his first professional win in over ten years and it would be his last career win as he lost his last two fights in 2018 against Aurel Ignat and top Belarusian kickboxer Igor Bugaenko.

== Titles ==
- Professional
  - 2007 WBKF Russian Champion - 76 kg
  - 2006 WBKF World Champion - 76 kg
  - 2005 WBKF Low-Kick Russian Champion - 76 kg
  - 2004 WBKF European Champion - 76 kg
  - 2004 WBKF Russian Champion - 76 kg
- Amateur
  - 2011 WAKO Russian Champion - 81 kg
  - 2007 WAKO Russian Champion - 75 kg
  - 2006 WAKO Russian Champion - 75 kg
  - 2006 WAKO European Championship runner-up - 75 kg
  - 2005 WAKO World Muay Thai Champion - 75 kg
  - 2005 WAKO Russian Championship runner-up - 75 kg
  - 2004 WAKO European Champion - 81 kg
  - 2004 WAKO Russian Championship runner-up - 81 kg
  - 2002 WAKO Russian Champion - 75 kg
  - 2002 WAKO World Champion - 75 kg

== Professional record ==
Kickboxing record
19 wins (6 KOs), 4 losses
Date	Result	Opponent	Event	Location	Method	Round	Time
2018-05-30	Loss	(Belarus) Igor Bugaenko	Zhara Fight Show	Moscow, Russia	Decision	3	3:00
2018-02-24	Loss	(Moldova) Aurel Ignat	ACB KB 13: From Paris with war	Paris, France	Decision (unanimous)	3	3:00
2017-08-04	Win	(Belgium) Filip Verlinden	Fight Night Saint-Tropez	Saint-Tropez, France	Decision (unanimous)	3	3:00
2015-04-03	Loss	(Morocco) Samir Boukhidous	Glory 20: Dubai	Dubai, UAE	TKO	-	-
2007-07-05	Win	(Bosnia and Herzegovina) Draženko Ninić	Rame uz rame	Budva, Montenegro	Decision (split)	5	3:00
2007-02-21	Win	(Russia) Kamil Yusupov	Arbat	Moscow, Russia	TKO	-	-
Wins 2007 WBKF -76 kg Russian title
2006-12-20	Win	(Russia) Vladimir Tyuin	Arbat, WBKF 4-man tournament Final	Moscow, Russia	Decision (split)	3	3:00
Wins 2006 WBKF -76 kg World title
2006-12-20	Win	(Ukraine) Artur Kyshenko	Arbat, WBKF 4-man tournament Semi-final	Moscow, Russia	Decision (split)	3	3:00
2006-10-24	Win	(Russia) Artem Levin	Fighting the World	Novosibirsk, Russia	Decision (unanimous)	5	3:00
2006-06-07	Win	(Russia) Evgeniy Mityugin	Fight Club Arbat	Moscow, Russia	TKO	-	-
2005-12-07	Win	(Russia) Islam Tsomaev	Fight Club Arbat	Moscow, Russia	Decision (split)	3	3:00
Wins 2005 WBKF Low-Kick -76 kg Russian title
2005-05-04	Win	(Ukraine) Dmitriy Kirpan	Fight Club Arbat	Moscow, Russia	KO	-	-
2005-03-23	Win	(Belarus) Aleksandr Svitin	Fight Club Arbat	Moscow, Russia	Decision (unanimous)	3	3:00
2004-12-08	Win	(France) Silvio Danois	Fight Club Arbat	Moscow, Russia	KO (left cross)	4	-
Wins 2004 WBKF -76 kg European title
2004-11-17	Win	(Kyrgyzstan) Katanbek Sydygaliev	Fight Club Arbat	Moscow, Russia	Decision (unanimous)	3	3:00
2004-10-06	Win	(Russia) Denis Grachev	Fight Club Arbat	Moscow, Russia	Decision (split)	3	3:00
2004-08-25	Win	(Russia) Islam Tsomaev	Fight Club Arbat	Moscow, Russia	Decision (unanimous)	3	3:00
2004-07-14	Win	(Russia) Abo Katamashvili	Fight Club Arbat	Moscow, Russia	TKO	-	-
2004-05-04	Loss	(Belarus) Dmitry Shakuta	"Kristall" Cup	Moscow, Russia	Decision (split)	3	3:00
2004-05-04	Win	(Belarus) Aleksey Kharkevych	"Kristall" Cup	Moscow, Russia	Decision (split)	3	3:00
2004-03-16	Win	(Russia) Islam Tsomaev	"Kristall" Cup	Moscow, Russia	Decision (unanimous)	3	3:00
2004-03-16	Win	(Russia) Islam Tsomaev	"Kristall" Cup	Moscow, Russia	Decision (unanimous)	3	3:00
2004-03-16	Win	(Georgia (country)) Armen Azizyan	"Kristall" Cup	Moscow, Russia	Decision (unanimous)	3	3:00
Legend: Win Loss Draw/no contest Notes
