= Emil Zoraj =

Croatian kickboxer

- Born: Emil Zoraj; July 27, 1978 (age 48); SR Croatia, SFR Yugoslavia
- Other names: Bulldog
- Nationality: (Croatia) Croatian
- Height: 1.78 m (5 ft 10 in)
- Weight: 79 kg (174 lb; 12 st 6 lb)
- Division: Light heavyweight
- Style: Muay Thai
- Team: Mejiro Gym (2001-2006); Spartan Gym (2006-)
- Trainer: Andre Mannaart (2001-2006); Aleksandar Pupac (2006-)
- Years active: 1993-

Kickboxing record
- Total: 46
- Wins: 38
- By knockout: 20
- Losses: 8

Emil Zoraj (born 27 July 1978) is a Croatian Light heavyweight kickboxer fighting out of Zagreb, Croatia. In his career he was double WKA thaiboxing world champion, It's Showtime 75MAX trophy Tilburg tournament champion, WBC Muaythai intercontinental champion and OPBU Euro-African muaythai champion.

== Career ==
He started training in 1993 only kickboxing, but also tried Savate and Full Contact. He started Muay Thai when he came to train with Branko Cikatić, and did it until then. He achieved good results in amateur competition, European gold and silver medalist with two bronze medals on World championships. He scored few knockout wins, with Marko Žaja, in Italy.

In 2001 he went in Netherlands to train with Andre Mannaart in Mejiro Gym. He made good progress, and participated in a gala tournament, scoring win over Sahin "Kaas" Yakut and losing in the final. He left Mejiro Gym after the rise of Remy Bonjasky, as he attracted all gym's attention.

Emil Zoraj first attracted worldwide attention making It's Showtime debut, winning It's Showtime 75 MAX Trophy Tilburg Pool B on December 12, 2005 in Tilburg, Netherlands. He defeated two Dutch fighters, Rayen Simson in semi finals and Sem Braan in final and qualified for It's Showtime 75MAX Trophy Final 2006 tournament.

On October 12, 2005 at Steko's Fight Night 17 he became World Kickboxing Association Thaiboxing world champion -83 kg defeating Jiri Bursa, next year also on Steko's Fight Night he won his third title and became World Kickboxing Association Thaiboxing world champion -76 kg defeating Adam Chajkin.

On September 23, 2006 he participated in an It's Showtime 75MAX Trophy Final 2006 tournament in Rotterdam, losing in quarter finals to Joerie Mes.

He won his fourth and fifth title on April 20, 2008 in Vienna, Austria defeating Otta Merling and becoming WBC Muaythai International Super Middleweight and OPBU Euro-African Muaythai Champion. Zoraj took the initiative since first round, earning a knockdown in second round with right cross and leaving a visible mark on Merling's head with an elbow in third.

He won bronze medal at IFMA 2009 World Muaythai Championships -75 kg category in December, 2009 defeating Remy Vectol in 1/8 finals and beating one of the best Muaythai fighters, Artem Levin bringing him one of very few career loses. He lost to tournament champion, Dmitry Valent by points, surviving nose injury in first round. He later suffered two amateur loses to Artem Levin.

Since winning WBC Muaythai and OPBU titles, Zoraj scored valuable victory against Myauthai legend Kaoklai Kaennorsing in Brno, Czech Republic and fought mostly in his homeland Croatia until 2010 when he decided to withdraw from the competition.

He returned to the fighting on March 15, 2013 in Zagreb, Croatia at K-1 World Grand Prix FINAL in Zagreb, where he was expected to fight Miran Fabjan then Giannis Sofokleus, but both were replaced and he fought Edmond Paltatzis. Zoraj's comeback was tough as he survived two knockdowns in first round, but achieved victory at the end of second round with a knee to the body of Paltatzis.

Later in the year he achieved victories at Final Fight Championship 4 over young Croatian prospect Zlatko Bajić and in Vienna on September 21, 2013 over Shkodran Veseli.

== Titles ==
- 2008 WBC Muaythai International Super Middleweight (-76 kg/168 lb) Champion
- 2008 OPBU Euro-African Muaythai Champion -76 kg
- 2006 WKA Thaiboxing world champion -76 kg
- 2005 WKA Thaiboxing world champion -83 kg
- 2005 It's Showtime 75MAX Trophy Tilburg Pool B Champion
- MTA European Champion
- 3 x IMTA European Thaiboxing Champion

== Fight record ==
Professional kickboxing record
Date	Result	Opponent	Event	Location	Method	Round	Time
2014-06-15	Win	(Serbia) Viktor Šubić	Muay Thai Gala	Zagreb, Croatia	Decision (unanimous)	3	3:00
2013-09-21	Win	(Albania) Shkodran Veseli	Fight Night	Vienna, Austria	Decision (split)	3	3:00
2013-05-10	Win	(Croatia) Zlatko Bajić	FFC04: Perak vs. Joni	Zadar, Croatia	Decision (unanimous)	3	3:00
2013-03-15	Win	(Greece) Edmond Paltatzis	K-1 World Grand Prix FINAL in Zagreb, Super Fight	Zagreb, Croatia	KO (knee)	2	3:00
2010-04-10	Win	(Slovakia) Miro Skriban	Return of the Gladiators	Dubrovnik, Croatia	KO (liver kick)	1	
2010-02-07	Win	(Serbia) Nikola Petrović	Bilić-Erić security FIGHT NIGHT IV	Zagreb, Croatia	Decision (unanimous)	3	3:00
2009-12-23	Win	(Bosnia and Herzegovina) Stanisvav Šahić	Noć Boksa	Zadar, Croatia	KO (knee)		
2009-10-16	Win	(Thailand) Kaoklai Kaennorsing	Return of the Gladiators	Brno, Czech Republic	Decision (Unanimous)	3	3:00
2009	Win	(Turkey) Senol Kiziltas			TKO	1	
2008-05-24	Loss	(Morocco) Najim Ettouhlali	Gentleman Promotions Fightnight	Tilburg, Netherlands	TKO		
2008-05-20	Win	(Turkey) Aydin Tuncay	Trg u Plamenu	Zagreb, Croatia	TKO (left high kick)	2	
2008-04-20	Win	(Slovakia) Otta Merling	Fight Night - Mortel Kombat	Vienna, Austria	Decision (Unanimous)	5	3:00
Wins the WBC Muaythai International Super Middleweight (-76kg/168lb) Championship, and OPBU Euro-African Muaythai Championship.
2007-10-27	Loss	(Suriname) Tyrone Spong	One Night in Bangkok	Antwerp, Belgium	TKO (doctor stoppage)	4	1:02
2006-09-23	Loss	(Netherlands) Joerie Mes	It's Showtime 75MAX Trophy Final 2006, Quarter Finals	Rotterdam, Netherlands	Decision	3	3:00
2006-05-02	Win	(Czech Republic) Adam Chajkin	Steko's Fight Night 19		KO	3	
Wins WKA Thaiboxing world title -76kg.
2006-03-18	Win	(Poland) Kamil Gregorczyk	Steko's Fight Night 18		KO	1	
2005-10-22	Loss	(Belarus) Dmitry Shakuta	SuperLeague Heavy Knockout 2005	Vienna, Austria	Decision	3	3:00
2005-10-12	Win	(Czech Republic) Jiri Bursa	Steko's Fight Night 17			4	
Wins WKA Thaiboxing world title -83kg.
2005-10-02	Win	(Netherlands) Sem Braan	It's Showtime 75MAX Trophy Tilburg, Final	Tilburg, Netherlands	Decision	3	3:00
Wins It's Showtime 75MAX Trophy Tilburg Pool B Final -75 kg. Qualifies for It's Showtime 75MAX Trophy Final 2006.
2005-10-02	Win	(Suriname) Rayen Simson	It's Showtime 75 MAX Trophy Tilburg Pool B Semi Finals	Tilburg, Netherlands	Decision (Unanimous)	3	3:00
2004-03-06	Loss	(France) Moussa Sissoko	Kings of the Ring	Priština, Serbia and Montenegro	TKO (ref. stoppage)	3	
For KOTR Muay Thai Championship 80kg.

Amateur muaythai record
Date	Result	Opponent	Event	Location	Method	Round	Time
2013-07-25	Loss	(Portugal)	IFMA 2013 European Muaythai Championships 1/8 final(75 kg)	Lisbon, Portugal	Decision	4	2:00
2010-08-29	Loss	(Russia) Artem Levin	2010 World Combat Games -75 kg Muay Thai, Quarter finals	Beijing, China	Decision (5:0)	4	2:00
2010-05-26	Loss	(Russia) Artem Levin	IFMA 2010 European Muaythai Championships 1/8 final(75 kg)	Velletri, Italy	Decision (5:0)	4	2:00
2009-12-03	Loss	(Belarus) Dmitry Valent	IFMA 2009 World Muaythai Championships 1/2 finals (75 kg)	Bangkok, Thailand	Decision	4	2:00
2009-12-01	Win	(Russia) Artem Levin	IFMA 2009 World Muaythai Championships 1/4 finals (75 kg)	Bangkok, Thailand	Decision	4	2:00
2009-11-11	Win	(France) Remy Vectol	IFMA 2009 World Muaythai Championships 1/8 finals (75 kg)	Bangkok, Thailand	KO (Right high kick)	2	
Legend: Win Loss Draw/No contest Notes

== See also ==
- List of male kickboxers
