= Jiří Žák =

Czech male kickboxer

- Born: 24 June 1978 (age 48); Chomutov, Czechoslovakia
- Nationality: Czech
- Height: 1.80 m (5 ft 11 in)
- Weight: 84 kg (185 lb; 13 st 3 lb)
- Division: Light Heavyweight
- Style: Kickboxing, Muay thai
- Fighting out of: Prague, Czech Republic
- Team: Hanuman Gym Praha
- Years active: 1997 - present

Kickboxing record
- Total: 110
- Wins: 85
- Losses: 25

Jiří Žák (born 24 June 1978) is a Czech kickboxer and Muay thai fighter. He is the former ISKA and WMC champion.

== Martial arts career ==
Žák participated in the 2009 March Souboj Titánů Cruiserweight tournament. He defeated Milan Hrubý by KO in the semifinals, and Tomáš Šenkýř by a third-round TKO in the finals.

Žák won two WFCA World titles. In 2010 he won the WFCA 82.5 kg title by a five-round decision over Clifton Brown, and in 2011 the WFCA 86 kg title, through a unanimous decision win over Fred Sikking.

Jiří Žák fought for the inaugural Enfusion 85 kg title against Mirko Cingel at Enfusion 14. Cingel won the bout by unanimous decision.

During the Česko vs Chorvatsko event, Žák fought Ivan Stanić for the ISKA World Cruiserweight title. Zak won the fight by a third-round TKO.

He fought Petr Ondruš during W5 Legends Grand Prix. Zak won the fight by TKO.

== Championships and accomplishments ==
- Czech Muay Thai Association
  - 1997 Czech Muay Thai Association Champion
  - 1998 Czech Muay Thai Association Champion
  - 1999 Czech Muay Thai Association Champion
  - 2002 Czech Muay Thai Association Champion
- International Sport Karate Association
  - 2001 International Sport Karate Association Champion
  - 2015 International Sport Karate Association World Muay Thai Cruiserweight Champion
- It's Showtime
  - 2005 It's Showtime 75MAX Trophy Preliminary Champion
- World Muaythai Council
  - 2006 World Muaythai Council Cruiserweight Champion
  - 2008 World Muaythai Council Cruiserweight I-1 Tournament Winner
- 5 Knockout Fight Night
  - 2007 5 Knockout Fight Night Tournament Winner
- Česká Asociace Kickboxu
  - 2008 Czech International Pro Kickboxing Champion
- Eight Brawl
  - 2008 Eight Brawl Cruiserweight Tournament Winner
- Souboj Titanu
  - 2009 Souboj Titanu Cruiserweight Tournament Winner
  - 2009 Souboj Titanu Cruiserweight Tournament Winner
- World Full Contact Association
  - 2010 World Full Contact Association 82.5 kg Champion
  - 2011 World Full Contact Association 86 kg Champion

== Fight record ==
Professional Kickboxing Record
85 Wins, 25 Losses, 0 Draw, 0 No Contest
Date	Result	Opponent	Event	Location	Method	Round	Time
2018-04-19	Win	(China) Zhou Wei	XFN	Prague, Czech Republic	Decision (Unanimous)	3	3:00
2017-11-25	Win	(Uzbekistan) Akhmet Alimbekov	Souboj Titánů	Plzeň, Czech Republic	TKO	3	
2016-10-8	Win	(Czech Republic) Petr Ondruš	World version W5 Grand Prix Legends in Prague	Prague, Czech Republic	TKO	1	
2016-04-15	Win	(Croatia) Teo Radnić	Souboj Titánů	Plzeň, Czech Republic	TKO	3	
2015-12-5	Loss	(Finland) Daniel Forsberg	Gibu Fight Night 2	Prague, Czech Republic	Decision (Unanimous)	3	3:00
2015-09-27	Win	(Croatia) Ivan Stanić	Česko vs Chorvatsko	Brno, Czech Republic	TKO	3	
Wins the ISKA World Cruiserweight Muay Thai title.
2014-11-28	Win	(Netherlands) Iwan Pang Atjok	Souboj Titánů	Plzeň, Czech Republic	KO		
2014-06-12	Win	(Netherlands) Hicham El Gaoui	Gibu Fight Night	Prague, Czech Republic	Decision (Unanimous)	3	3:00
2014-04-26	Loss	(Slovakia) Miroslav Cingel	Enfusion Live 17	Žilina, Slovakia	Decision (Unanimous)	5	3:00
For the Enfusion 85 kg title.
2014-04-26	Win	(Russia) Rustam Guseinov	Enfusion Live 17	Žilina, Slovakia	Decision (Unanimous)	4	3:00
Semi Finals
2014-04-4	Win	(Austria) David Keclik	Souboj Titánů	Plzeň, Czech Republic	TKO	3	
2013-04-27	Loss	(Slovakia) Vladimír Idrany	Gala Night Žilina	Žilina, Slovakia	Decision (Unanimous)	3	3:00
2011-11-6	Loss	(Russia) Artem Vakhitov	Muaythai Premier League: Third Round Netherlands	The Hague, Netherlands	Decision (Unanimous)	3	3:00
2011-10-8	Loss	(Belgium) Marc de Bonte	Muaythai Premier League: Second Round Italy	Padova, Italy	Decision (Unanimous)	3	3:00
2011-05-27	Win	(Netherlands) Fred Sikking	Grand Prix Chomutov	Nitra, Slovakia	Decision (Unanimous)	5	3:00
Wins the WFCA 86 kg World title.
2011-04-14	Win	(Netherlands) Cedric Coopra	Superliga	Czech Republic	TKO	3	
2010-11-27	Loss	(Sweden) Rickard Nordstand	Rumble of the Kings: Kruth Vs Sapp	Stockholm, Sweden	Decision (Unanimous)	3	3:00
2010-6-25	Win	(Netherlands) Donald Berner	Czech Grand Prix	Prague, Czech Republic	KO		
2010-3-20	Win	(Canada) Clifton Brown	Gala Night Thai Boxing	Žilina, Slovakia	Decision (Unanimous)	5	
Wins the WFCA 82.5 kg World title.
2009-11-22	Win	(Slovakia) Tomáš Šenkýr	Souboj Titánů, Tournament Final	Plzeň, Czech Republic	Decision (Majority)	3	3:00
Wins the Souboj Titánů Cruiserweight Tournament.
2009-11-22	Win	(Russia) Artem Vakhitov	Souboj Titánů, Tournament Semifinal	Plzeň, Czech Republic	Decision (Unanimous)	4	3:00
2009-11-22	Win	(Germany) Priest West	Souboj Titánů, Tournament Quarterfinal	Plzeň, Czech Republic	Decision (Majority)	3	3:00
2009-10-17	Win	(Russia) Alexey Kunchenko	Souboj Titánů	Plzeň, Czech Republic	Decision (Majority)	3	3:00
2009-06-25	Win	(Belarus) Pavel Turuk	Gladiators Games	Prague, Czech Republic	KO	3	
2009-05-16	Win	(France) Raymond Gimenez	Légendes & Guerriers	Toulouse, France	KO (Injury)	4	
2009-04-17	Win	(Slovakia) Tomáš Šenkýr	Souboj Titánů, Tournament Final	Plzeň, Czech Republic	TKO	3	
Wins the Souboj Titánů Cruiserweight Tournament.
2009-04-17	Win	(Slovakia) Milan Hrubý	Souboj Titánů, Tournament Semifinal	Plzeň, Czech Republic	KO	1	
2009-03-14	Win	(Slovakia) Erik Kozstenko	Gala Night Thaiboxing	Žilina, Slovakia	Decision (Unanimous)	3	3:00
2008-12-17	Win	(Germany) Albert Kriezu	International Czech Title Kick box	Prague, Czech Republic	Decision (Unanimous)	3	3:00
Wins the Czech International Pro Kickboxing title.
2008-10-11	Win	(Slovakia) Erik Kozstenko	World Muaythai Council I-1, Tournament Final	Prague, Czech Republic	KO		
Wins the World Muaythai Council I-1 Cruiserweight Tournament.
2008-10-11	Win	(Slovakia) Marcel Jager	World Muaythai Council I-1, Tournament Semifinal	Prague, Czech Republic	Decision (Unanimous)	3	3:00
2008-10-11	Win	(Slovakia) Martin Tomascik	World Muaythai Council I-1, Tournament Quarterfinal	Prague, Czech Republic	KO		
2008-06-14	Win	(Netherlands) Ruben Van Der Giesen	Eight Brawl, Tournament Final	Copenhagen, Denmark	KO	2	
Wins the Eight Brawl Cruiserweight Tournament.
2008-06-14	Win	(Netherlands) Ali Reza	Eight Brawl, Tournament Semifinal	Copenhagen, Denmark	Decision (Unanimous)	3	3:00
2008-06-14	Win	(Denmark) Ole Laursen	Eight Brawl, Tournament Quarterfinal	Copenhagen, Denmark	TKO	3	
2008-03-15	Loss	(Netherlands) Sem Braan	It's Showtime: Finale Trophy MAX 75	Copenhagen, Denmark	TKO	3	
2007-06-23	Win	(Italy) Roberto Cocco	5 Knockout Fight Night, Tournament Final	Lucerne, Switzerland	Decision (Unanimous)	3	3:00
Wins the 5 Knockout Fight Night Tournament.
2007-06-23	Win	(Portugal) Luís Reis	5 Knockout Fight Night, Tournament Semifinal	Lucerne, Switzerland	KO		
2007-04-14	Loss	(Morocco) Younes El Mhassani	Knockout Fight Night	Lucerne, Switzerland	Decision (Unanimous)	3	3:00
2007-03-24	Win	(Netherlands) Tarek Slimani	Fights At The Border V	Lommel, Belgium	Decision (Unanimous)	3	3:00
2006-12-16	Loss	(Czech Republic) Ondřej Hutník	K-1 Fighting Network Prague Round '07	Prague, Czech Republic	Decision (Unanimous)	3	3:00
2006-09-23	Loss	(Netherlands) Şahin Yakut	It's Showtime: Finale	Rotterdam, Netherlands	Decision (Unanimous)	3	3:00
2006-09-23	Loss	(Netherlands) Ruben van der Giesen	It's Showtime Enter The Plaza	Netherlands	Decision (Unanimous)	3	3:00
2006-05-12	Win	(Latvia) Sandris Tomsons	Teplis		KO		
Won the World Muaythai Council Title
2005-10-30	Win	(Netherlands) Tarek Slimani	It's Showtime 75Max Trophy	Alkmaar, Netherlands	Decision (Unanimous)	4	3:00
Won the 75MAX Trophy preliminary title
2005-10-30	Win	(Netherlands) Omar Tekin	It's Showtime 75Max Trophy	Alkmaar, Netherlands	Decision (Unanimous)	3	3:00
2005-10-02	Loss	(Netherlands) Sem Braan	It's Showtime 75Max Trophy Tilburg, Semi-Finals	Netherlands	Decision (Unanimous)	3	3:00
2005-07-23	Loss	(Australia) Eugene Ekkelboom					
For the World Muaythai Council World Super middleweight title.
2005	Win	(Germany) Brian Al Amin	Hameln		KO		
2004-12-19	Win	(Netherlands) Sem Braan	IMA: Staredown City 2004	Landsmeer, Netherlands	Decision (Unanimous)	5	3:00
2004-05-22	Loss	(Belarus) Dmitry Shakuta	SuperLeague Switzerland 2004	Winterthur, Switzerland	Decision	5	3:00
2004-03-30	Win	(Italy) Roberto Cocco	SuperLeague Italy 2004	Italy	Decision (Unanimous)	5	3:00
2003-12-12	Win	(Croatia) Ivica Cukucic	Heaven Or Hell		Decision (Unanimous)		
2002-	Win	(Estonia) Tarvo Rahuoja	CMTA		KO (Knee)		
2000-	Win	(Thailand) Samran Kananvhrit	CMTA		Decision	5	3:00
Legend: Win Loss Draw/No contest Notes

== See also ==
- List of male kickboxers
