= L'houcine Ouzgni =

- Born: March 10, 1984 (age 42)
- Other names: Aussie
- Nationality: Dutch; Moroccan
- Height: 1.92 m (6 ft 3 1/2 in)
- Weight: 76 kg (168 lb; 12.0 st)
- Division: Welterweight; Middleweight; Catchweight; Light Heavyweight
- Style: Muay Thai
- Fighting out of: Morocco
- Team: Top Team Beverwijk
- Trainer: Hans Nijman, M. Ben Ali.

Kickboxing record
- Total: 69
- Wins: 64
- By knockout: 30
- Losses: 5
- Last updated on: April 6, 2019

L'houcine "Aussie" Ouzgni (born 10 March 1983) is a Dutch-Moroccan former Light Heavyweight/Middleweight Muay Thai kickboxer. Aussie was known as a firm fan favorite in the Netherlands due to his exciting style and knockout power, likened to a smaller version of fellow Dutch-Moroccan fighter Badr Hari. He is a three time Dutch national Muay Thai champion and a It's Showtime world champion.

== Biography/Career ==
Aussie began his career fighting on the local circuit in the Netherlands at C-Klass and B-Klass level, winning almost all his fights. He won his first title in 2005, winning a B-Klass eight-man tournament at a gala in Purmerend to honor the recently deceased Moroccan-Dutch boxer Nordin Ben-Salah who was shot dead in Amsterdam. Aussie stopped his first two opponents before defeating Peter Mes in the final via decision. He also headed to Morocco where he took part in the W.A.K.O. world championships, receiving a bronze medal in the Thai-Boxing middleweight division. In 2006 Aussie made his debut with the It's Showtime organization against Junior Gonsalves, sharing the spoils in a five-round decision draw at the event in Alkmaar. He returned to the organization the following year to take part in a qualifying tournament for the It's Showtime's 75MAX Trophy, defeating Henry Akdeniz in the quarter-finals by decision but was unable to proceed due to an injury suffered during his victory.

In 2008 Aussie won his first major honor (at A-Klass level) against Melvin van Leeuwarden picking up the I.R.O. Dutch title. He added another belt the following year, beating the seasoned Imro Main by technical knockout to add the U.M.C. Dutch title to his repertoire. With title wins making him noticed on the Dutch circuit, Aussie continued his progress beating good pros such as Amir Zeyada, Ali Gunyar and It's Showtime Reality winner Sem Braan. He then demolished in form Nieky Holzken in less than a minute to emerge as a major player on the It's Showtime circuit, earning himself a title shot for the organizations vacant 77MAX world title at the end of 2010.

At the Fightclub presents: It's Showtime 2010 he faced the highly decorated Russian Artem Levin, who had recently beat Yodsaenklai Fairtex to win gold at the 2010 World Combat Games. The title fight was a fairly even affair, with Aussie well in it until the fourth round, when a toe from an Artem kick injured Aussie his eye, leaving him unable to continue. In March 2011 Aussie met two-time K-1 MAX and three time S-Cup world champion Andy Souwer, dropping down in weight to fight at 70 kg. Perhaps drained from the weight cut, he was not his normal explosive self and was outclassed by Souwer who took a unanimous points decision victory.

He will fight Mike de Snoo in Beverwijk, Netherlands on October 21, 2012, but by injury Mike de Snoo was replaced by Douli Chen who only fought 2 fights in the A-Classe. Duoli Chen lost respectively against the experienced Moroccan Aussie with points. .

He lost to Marc de Bonte by KO from a knee in round one at Glory 6: Istanbul in Istanbul, Turkey on April 6, 2013.

His release from Glory was reported in February 2014, having gone 0–1 in the promotion.

== Titles ==
Professional

- 2012 It's Showtime 73 kg MAX World Champion
- 2009 U.M.C. Super Middleweight Dutch title -76.2 kg
- 2008 I.R.O. Super Middleweight Dutch title -76.2 kg
- 2005 Muaythai Gala Purmerend B-Klass tournament -76 kg

Amateur

- 2005 W.A.K.O. World Championships in Agadir, Morocco (bronze) -75 kg (Thai-Boxing)

== Fight record ==
Professional Kickboxing and Muay Thai Record
64 Wins (30 (T)KO's), 5 Losses, 0 Draw
Date	Result	Opponent	Event	Location	Method	Round	Time
2013-04-06	Loss	(Belgium) Marc de Bonte	Glory 6: Istanbul	Istanbul, Turkey	KO (knee)	1	
2012-10-21	Win	(Netherlands) Duoli Chen	Top Team Beverwijk Gala	Beverwijk, Netherlands	Decision	3	3:00
2012-09-02	Win	(Netherlands) Nieky Holzken	Muay Thai Mania V	The Hague, Netherlands	Extra R. Decision	4	3:00
2012-01-28	Win	(France) Yohan Lidon	It's Showtime 2012 in Leeuwarden	Leeuwarden, Netherlands	Decision	5	3:00
Wins It's Showtime 73MAX World title -73 kg.
2011-10-16	Loss	(Morocco) Hicham El Gaoui	Beverwijk Top Team Gala	Beverwijk, Netherlands	Decision		
2011-03-06	Loss	(Netherlands) Andy Souwer	It's Showtime Sporthallen Zuid	Amsterdam, Netherlands	Decision (Unanimous)	3	3:00
2010-12-18	Loss	(Russia) Artem Levin	Fightclub presents: It's Showtime 2010	Amsterdam, Netherlands	TKO (Eye Injury)	4	2:29
Fight was for vacant It's Showtime 77MAX world title -77 kg.
2010-10-24	Win	(Netherlands) Henry Akdeniz	Top Team Beverwijk Gala	Beverwijk, Netherlands	TKO (Ref Stop/3 Knockdowns)	4	
2010-09-12	Win	(Netherlands) Nieky Holzken	Fightingstars presents: It's Showtime 2010	Amsterdam, Netherlands	KO (Left Flying Knee)	1	0:53
2010-05-29	Win	(Netherlands) Sem Braan	It's Showtime 2010 Amsterdam	Amsterdam, Netherlands	Decision (4–1)	3	3:00
2010-03-21	Win	(Morocco) Khalid Chabrani	K-1 World MAX 2010 West Europe Tournament, Super Fight	Utrecht, Netherlands	Decision	3	3:00
2010-02-27	Win	(Turkey) Ali Gunyar	Fight Club Amsterdam III	Amsterdam, Netherlands	KO (Right Cross)	2	
2010-01-30	Win	(Morocco) Halim Issaoui	Beast Of The East	Amsterdam, Netherlands	Decision	3	3:00
2009-10-25	Win	(Egypt) Amir Zeyada	Top Team Beverwijk Gala	Beverwijk, Netherlands	Decision	3	3:00
2009-04-11	Win	(Thailand) Wehaj Kingboxing	Fight Club Amsterdam	Amsterdam, Netherlands	KO (Punches)	2	
2009-03-08	Win	(Suriname) Imro Main	Beatdown Amsterdam	Amsterdam, Netherlands	TKO (Corner Stop/Left Uppercut)	4	
Wins U.M.C. Super Middleweight Dutch title -76.2 kg.
2008-10-26	Loss	(Netherlands) Sem Braan	Top Team Gala Beverwijk	Beverwijk, Netherlands	KO (High Kick + Punch)	5	
2008-03-30	Win	(Netherlands) Melvin van Leeuwarden	Dangerzone V, Zonnehuis	Amsterdam, Netherlands	TKO (Doc Stop/Cut, Flying Knee)	1	
Wins I.R.O. Super Middleweight Dutch title -76.2 kg.
2008-02-17	Win	(Germany) Ömer Isitan	K-1 MAX Netherlands 2008, Super Fight	Utrecht, Netherlands	TKO (Knee Injury)	1	
2007-02-02	Win	(Netherlands) Henry Akdeniz	It's Showtime 75MAX Trophy Zwolle, Quarter-finals	Zwolle, Netherlands	Decision	3	3:00
Despite victory has to withdraw from tournament due to injury.
2006-12-03	Draw	(Suriname) Junior Gonsalves	It's Showtime 2006 Alkmaar	Alkmaar, Netherlands	Decision Draw	5	3:00
2006-10-15	Win	(Netherlands) Jeremi Blijd	Top Team Beverwijk Muaythai Gala	Beverwijk, Netherlands	Decision (Unanimous)	3	3:00
2006-05-20	Win	(Netherlands) Edie Benton	Muaythai Gala "Fighting Nordin Memorial II"	Purmerend, Netherlands	KO		
2005-11-05	Win	(Belgium) Kevin de Bougne	Thaibox Gala in Breda	Breda, Netherlands	Decision	5	2:00
2006-01-28	Win	(Greece) Panayotis Tsirimokos	Fight Club, Wellness Profi Center	Purmerend, Netherlands	TKO		
2005-06-18	Win	(Turkey) Mesut Derin	Showdome IV, Amsterdam Velodrome	Amsterdam, Netherlands	Decision (Unanimous)	5	2:00
2005-05-21	Win	(Netherlands) Peter Mes	Muaythai Gala Purmerend, B-Klass Final	Purmerend, Netherlands	Decision	3	2:00
Wins Muaythai Gala Purmerend B-Klass tournament title -76 kg.
2005-05-21	Win	(Morocco) Khalid Chabrani	Muaythai Gala Purmerend, B-Klass Semi-finals	Purmerend, Netherlands	KO	1	
2005-05-21	Win	(Morocco) Mohammed Aouragh	Muaythai Gala Purmerend, B-Klass Quarter-finals	Purmerend, Netherlands	TKO (Corner Stop)	1	
2005-02-13	Win	(Netherlands) Matias Ipssa	Gala gala Hoornse Vaart	Alkmaar, Netherlands	Decision	5	2:00
2004-05-29	Win	(Czech Republic) Petr Kuchar	Gym Alkmaar Gala, Sporthal de Myse	Schermerhorn, Netherlands	TKO	3	
2004-03-14	Loss	(Netherlands) Cedric Bacuna	Killer Dome V, Bijlmer Sportcentrum	Amsterdam, Netherlands	TKO (Ref Stop)	3	
2004-01-25	Win	(Morocco) Abdul Selam	Thaiboxing & Freefight event in Alkmaar	Alkmaar, Netherlands	Decision	5	2:00
2003-11-30	Win	(Suriname) Jermain Welles	Killer Dome IV, Bijlmer Sportcentrum	Amsterdam, Netherlands	TKO (Corner Stop)	4	
2003-02-15	Win	(Suriname) Jermain Welles	Xena Sport Victory or Hell 8	Amsterdam, Netherlands	Decision	3	3:00
2003-01-26	Win	(Czech Republic) Petr Kuchar	Gala in Schremerhorn	Schermerhorn, Netherlands	TKO	2	
2002-10-02	Loss	(Netherlands) Wesley Romijn	Muaythai Gala, Zonnehuis	Amsterdam, Netherlands	Disqualification	1	
Legend: Win Loss Draw/No contest Notes
