= Priest West =

German light heavyweight kickboxer (born 1974)

- Born: Priest Tyron Thomas West; July 21, 1974 (age 52); Mannheim, Germany
- Nationality: German
- Height: 1.84 m (6 ft 1/2 in)
- Weight: 82 kg (181 lb; 12.9 st)
- Division: Light Heavyweight
- Style: Muay Thai
- Team: Thai-Bombs Mannheim
- Trainer: Michael Damboer
- Years active: 1998–2015

Kickboxing record
- Total: 110
- Wins: 85
- By knockout: 35
- Losses: 23
- Draws: 1
- No contests: 1
- Last updated on: November 11, 2009

Priest Tyron Thomas West (born July 29, 1974) is a German light heavyweight kickboxer, who competed in Muay Thai. He is a former WMC European Muay Thai Champion, IKBF European Champion, IKBF World Champion K1 and WKA World Champion K1.

== Fighting career ==
April 2003 Priest won in round three via TKO against Billy Cuba the IKBF German Title cruiser weight

October 2003 Priest won after five rounds by points against Christan Dinger (GER) the German MTBD / WMC Title super light heavy weight

September 2006 Priest won after five rounds the WMC European Title against Martin Kubes (CZ) super light heavy weight

West fought Clifton Brown(CND) for the World Muaythai Council (WMC) world super light heavyweight title on October 27, 2007. Priest have to give up in round one by knee injury.

On September 25, 2010, Priest West fought Marcin Tomczyk (Poland) at Fight Night Mannheim to determine the IKBF (K-1 Rules) European Championship at -82.55 kg. West won the title via K.O. in the 5th round.

In October 2011, Priest won against Eldad Levy (Israel) by points 5:0, earning the IKBF Worldtitel after five hard rounds.

On June 2, 2012, Priest faced Tomi Čolić from Croatia and won the WKA World title (K1) by Kick-Ko in round 3.

== Titles ==
- 2012 WKA World Champion K1
- 2011 IKBF World Champion K1
- 2010 IKBF European Champion K1
- 2007 WMC Vize World Champion Muay Thai
- 2003/2009 German Champion MTBD/WMC Muay Thai (Professionals)
- 2006 WMC European Champion Muay Thai
- 2006 IFMA Europa Windy Cup Winner Muay Thai
- 2005 WMC Windy Muay Thai Super Cup Tournament (82 kg) finalist
- 2003/2005/2006 Bronze Medal Winner IFMA World Championship
- 2003 German Champion IKBF Kickboxing (Professionals)
- 2003 Int. German Champion Amateur Muay Thai IFMA
- 2002/2004 Int. Sowenia Champion IFMA
- 2002 Vize - European Champion Amateur Muay Thai IMTF
- 2001/2002 Int. German Champion Amateur Muay Thai IMTF
- 2000/2001 Int. German Champion IKBF Kickboxing Amateurs
- 2000 Int. Austrian Champion Amateur Muay Thai IMTF

== Professional kickboxing record ==
Kickboxing record
| Date | Result | Opponent | Event | Location | Method | Round | Time |
|---|---|---|---|---|---|---|---|
| 2013-09-28 | NC | (Turkey) Taylan Yesil | Apache Fight Night | Germany | NC | | |
For WKU K1 World title.
| 2012-10-20 | Loss | (Germany) Patric Kolbe | | Germany | TKO | 2 | |
| 2012-09-01 | Win | (Morocco) Omar Armani | Mix Fight Gala Frankfurt | Frankfurt, Germany | Decision (Unanimous) | 3 | 3:00 |
| 2012-06-02 | Win | (Croatia) Tomi Čolić | | | KO (Kick) | 3 | |
Wins WKA World K-1 rules title.
| 2011-11-19 | Loss | (Czech Republic) Filip Sykora | Souboj Titanu, Final | Czech Republic | TKO | 1 | |
Fight was for Souboj Titanu tournament title.
| 2011-11-19 | Win | (Czech Republic) Jiri Kopencny | Souboj Titanu, Semi finals | Czech Republic | KO (Kick) | 2 | |
| 2011-10 | Win | (Israel) Eldad Levy | | | Decision (Unanimous) | 5 | 3:00 |
Wins IKBF (K-1 Rules) World title.
| 2010-11-20 | Win | (Turkey) Tarik Kuzucu | The Champions Club 5 | Bamberg, Germany | Decision (Unanimous) | 3 | 3:00 |
| 2010-10-07 | Win | (Netherlands) Geronimo de Groot | Mix Fight Gala 10 | | KO | 3 | |
| 2010-09-25 | Win | (Poland) Marcin Tomczyk | Fight Night Mannheim | Mannheim, Germany | KO | 5 | |
Wins IKBF (K-1 Rules) European Title 82.5 kg.
| 2010-01-10 | Loss | (Turkey) Mehmet Aksoy | | Adana, Turkey | TKO (Injury) | 1 | |
| 2009-12-05 | Win | (Aruba) Marcello Adriaansz | Mix Fight Gala IX | Darmstadt, Germany | Ext. R. Decision | 4 | 3:00 |
| 2009-11-23 | Loss | (Czech Republic) Jiri Zak | | | Decision (Split) | 3 | 3:00 |
| 2009-11-01 | Win | (Turkey) Hakan Aksoy | | | TKO | 1 | |
| 2008-12-13 | Win | (Germany) Pierre Clasen | The Champions Club 2 | Bamberg, Germany | TKO | | |
| 2007-10-27 | Loss | (Canada) Clifton Brown | WMC "The Champions Club" | Bamberg, Germany | TKO (Knee injury) | 1 | |
For WMC World Title 82.5 kg.
| 2007-06-29 | Loss | (Hungary) Attila Karacs | Fighting European Tour 2007, Semi Finals | Martigues, France | TKO (injury) | 2 | 1:10 |
| 2007-06-29 | Win | (Croatia) Marko Tomašević | Fighting European Tour 2007, Quarter Finals | Martigues, France | Decision | 3 | 3:00 |
Legend: Win Loss Draw/No contest Notes
