= Clifton Brown (kickboxer) =

Canadian kickboxer (born 1976)

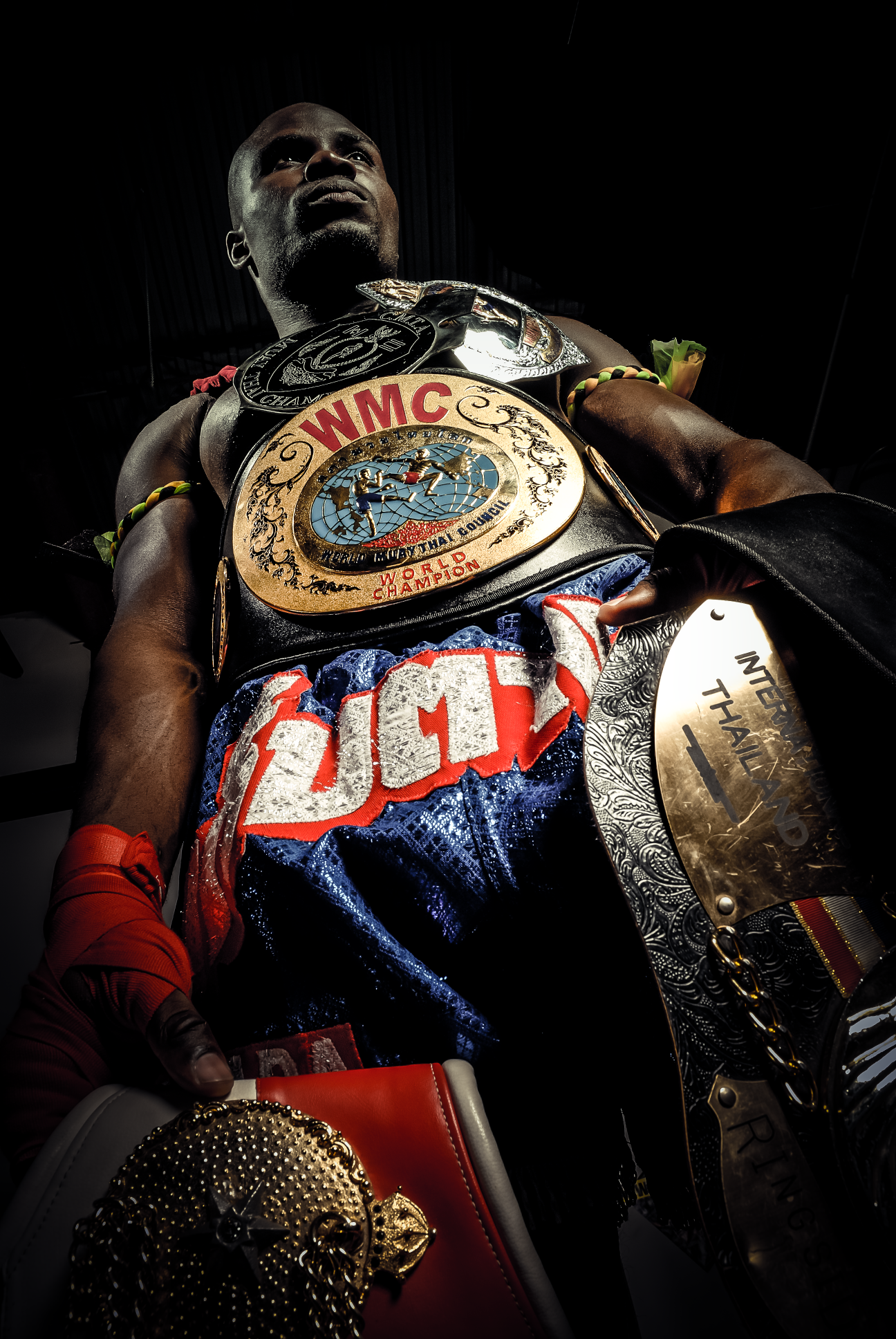
- Born: August 29, 1976 (age 50); Toronto, Ontario, Canada
- Nationality: Canada
- Height: 1.85 m (6 ft 1 in)
- Weight: 76 kg (168 lb; 12.0 st), 82.55 kg (182.0 lb; 12.999 st) 86.02 kg (189.6 lb; 13.546 st)
- Division: Super Middleweight, Light Heavyweight, Super Light Heavyweight, Cruiserweight
- Style: Muay Thai
- Team: Siam No1
- Years active: 1997–2010

Kickboxing record
- Total: 55
- Wins: 43
- By knockout: 32
- Losses: 11
- By knockout: 4
- No contests: 1

Clifton Brown (born August 29, 1976) is a Canadian former Light Heavyweight Muaythai kickboxer of Jamaican descent. He is a former IMF, IKKC, and World Muaythai Council world champion. Following his competitive career, he served as the first head coach of the Canadian National Muaythai team during the sport's inclusion at the Paris 2024 Olympic Games.

== Career ==
Brown began his formal Muaythai journey in Toronto, training exclusively at the Siam No. 1 Muay Thai Academy under Ajahn Suchart Yodkerepauprai. He also trained in Thailand at Sityodtong Muay Thai Academy in Chonburi with Yodtong Senanan.

From 1997 to 2010, he captured five world titles across International Muay Thai Federation (IMF), the International Karate and Kickboxing Council (IKKC), and the World Muaythai Council (WMC).

In 2008, in Montego Bay, Jamaica, Brown he faced Kaoklai Kaennorsing at Champions of Champions series and lost by split decision The following year, Brown secured his most notable career victory at Champions of Champions II, avenging the prior loss by defeating Kaoklai in the rematch to capture the vacant WMC World Super Light Heavyweight Title (82.5 kg).

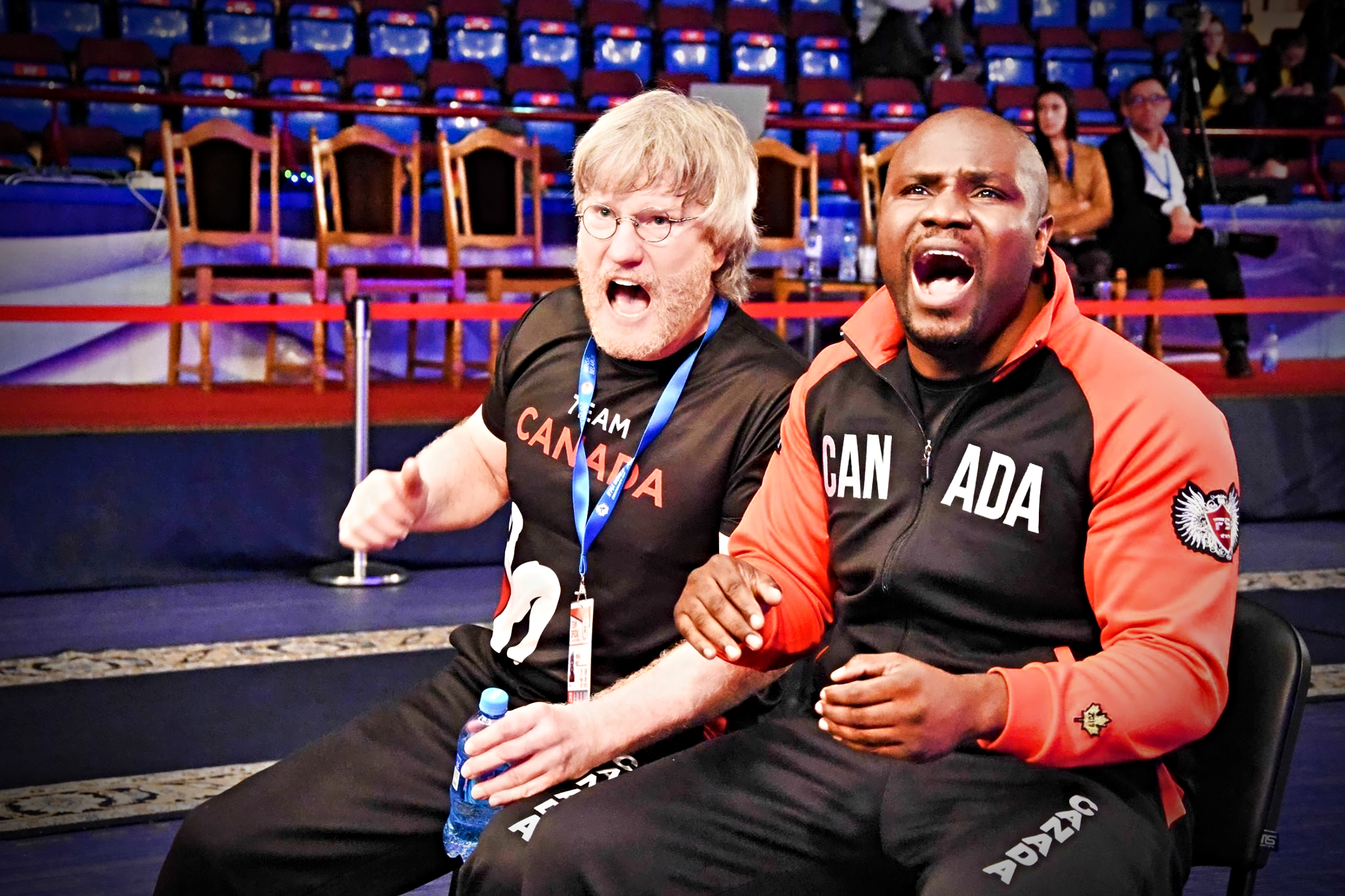
Ajahn Mike Miles & Clifton Brown - 2017 IFMA World Championships

In November 2016, the International Olympic Committee (IOC) granted provisional recognition to Muay Thai. In April 2017, Muaythai Canada, the national governing body mandated to develop Olympic-caliber athletes, appointed Clifton Brown as Canada's first National Team Head Coach.

Brown was selected to represent Canada as National Coach during Muay Thai's debut as an official demonstration sport at the Paris 2024 Olympic Games.

In 2023, Brown was recognized becoming the first North American Nak Muay to be formally inducted into the official International Federation of Muaythai Associations and World Muaythai Council Muay Thai Hall of Fame in Bangkok, Thailand.

== Professional and Amateur Championships ==
- 2009 | WMC World Super Light Heavyweight Champion
- 2007 | WMC World Super Light Heavyweight Champion
- 2004 | IKKC World Cruiserweight Champion
- 2003 | WMC World Super Light Heavyweight Champion
- 2003 | WMC Intercontinental Super Light Heavyweight Champion
- 2001 | IMF World Super Middleweight Champion
- 1999 | CMTA North American Light Heavyweight Champion
- 1998 | CMTC Canadian Super Middleweight Amateur Champion

== Executive and Media Career ==
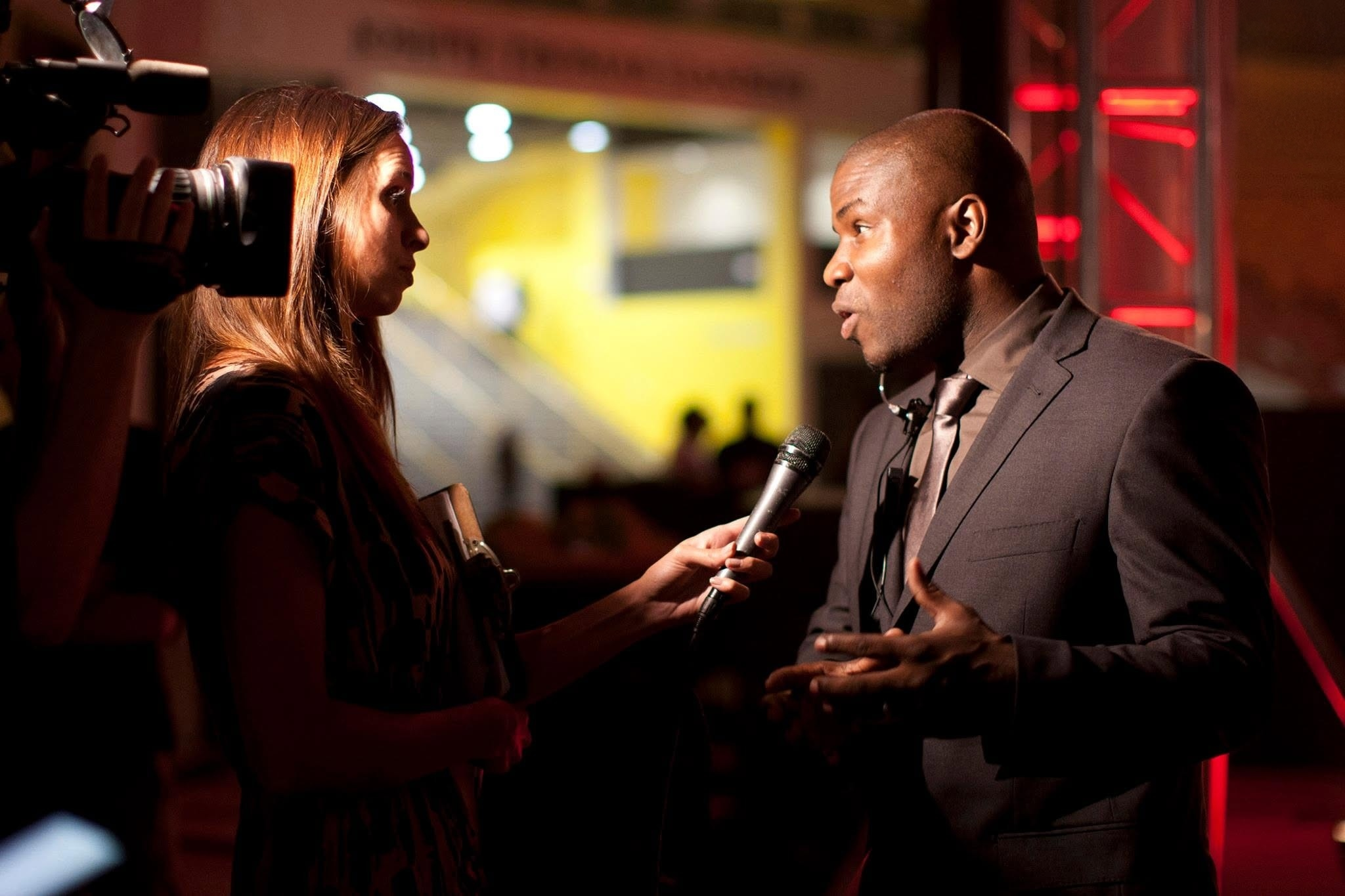

Brown serves as the president and CEO of Warrior Caste Interactive Inc. media production entity, which primarily focuses on athlete-centric documentaries. Brown operated the MPL, a high-profile international league designed to showcase elite global Muay Thai talent. Brown brought Muay Thai into Western mainstream broadcasting as a recurring host and fighter on G4TV's Champions of Champions Elite. In 2009, he was selected by producer Mark Burnett to serve as a team coach for season two of the reality sports series The Contender Asia ("The Challenger") in Kuala Lumpur, Malaysia. Brown is the creator, producer, and co-writer of the martial-arts-centric television series Into the Fire.

== Kickboxing Record ==
43 wins (32 (T)KOs, 10 decisions), 11 losses (incomplete)
Date	Result	Opponent	Event	Method	Round	Time
2010-03-21	Loss	(Czech Republic) Jiri Zak	Gala Night Zilna, Zilna, Slovakia WFCA World Title 82.5 kg	Decision (unanimous)	5	3:00
2009-11-21	Loss	(Sweden) Rickard Nordstrand	K-1 Rumble of the Kings 2009 in Stockholm, Stockholm, Sweden WMC World Title 82.5 kg	TKO (dr. stop.)	2	1:00
2009-06-26	Win	(Thailand) Kaoklai Kaennorsing	CCGI's "Champion of Champions 2", Montego Bay, Jamaica WMC World Title 82.5 kg	Decision (unanimous)	5	3:00
2008-11-15	Win	(Jamaica) Stephan Richards	ShinDo Kumate 15 "Strykerz Showdown", Tampa, Florida 83 kg	TKO (ref. stop/elbows)	2	
2008-11-08	Loss	(Czech Republic) Ondrej Hutnik	Janus Fight Night "The Legend", Padua, Italy 84 kg	TKO (doctor stop./cut)	2	
2008-08-09	Win	(United States) Crafton Wallace	ShinDo Kumate 14 "Ancient Ones", Tampa, Florida 83 kg	TKO (ref. stop./elbows)	3	
2008-06-20	Loss	(Thailand) Kaoklai Kaennorsing	CCGI's "Champion of Champions", Montego Bay, Jamaica 83 kg	Decision (split)	5	3:00
2007-10-27	Win	(Germany) Priest West	WMC "The Champions Club", Bamberg, Germany WMC World Title 82.5 kg	TKO (knee injury)	1	
2006-11-11	Loss	(Australia) Nathan Corbett	Macau "Xplosion" Super Fights, Macau, China WMC World Title 86 kg	KO (uppercut)	2	
2006-03-31	Win	(United States) Anthony Brown	Gladiadores Extremos, Guadalajara, Mexico 80 kg	TKO (ref. stop./elbows)	3	
2005-11-19	Loss	(Brazil) Moises Baptista De Sousa	SuperLeague Portugal 2005, Carcavelos, Portugal 76 kg	KO (right hook)	3	
2005-10-22	Win	(Italy) Roberto Cocco	SuperLeague Heavy Knockout 2005, Vienna, Austria 76 kg	Decision	3	3:00
2005-05-21	Loss	(Belarus) Dmitry Shakuta	SuperLeague Germany 2005, Oberhausen, Germany 76 kg	Decision (split)	5	3:00
2004-11-20	Win	(United States) Manson Gibson	Matter of Pride 8, Los Angeles, California IKKC World Title 82 kg	TKO (leg kicks)	4	
2004-10-23	Win	(Austria) David Keclik	SuperLeague Germany 2004, Oberhausen, Germany 76 kg	KO (knees)	2	
2004-08-28	Win	(Thailand) Slatun	WMC Thailand VS The World, Surat Thani, Thailand #2 Ranked 77 kg	KO (uppercut)	3	
2004-06-11	Loss	(Russia) Magomed Magomedov	WMC Championships, Bangkok, Thailand WMC World Title 79 kg	Decision (split)	5	3:00
2003-12-16	Loss	(Australia) Nathan Corbett	"Xplosion" Australia, Gold Coast, Australia WMC World Title 82 kg	KO (right elbow)	2	
2003-10-14	Win	(Thailand) Gongdet Sor.Visanu	WMC Thailand VS The World, Surat Thani, Thailand 76 kg	KO (knees)	3	
2003-07-25	Win	(Sweden) Frederic Rosenberg	Thailand vs The World, Bangkok, Thailand WMC World Title 82.5 kg	KO (kicks/broken arm)	2	
2003-06-21	Win	(United States) Tom Grimmer	Michigan Mayhem, Michigan, USA 79 kg	Decision	3	3:00
2002-11-30	NC	(Mali) Moussa Sissoko	Kickboxing Mondiale 3, Padua, Italy -83 kg	(leg injury)	1	
2002-03-17	Win	(Canada) Shawn Jansen	Canada VS Thailand, Vancouver, British Columbia 79 kg	KO (left hook)	1	
2001-12-27	Win	(Thailand) Yimpitak Sor.Khaitong	Chonburi Super 8, Pattaya, Thailand 73 kg	KO (knees)	2	
2001-12-27	Win	(Thailand) Foreman Sor.Panut	Chonburi Super 8, Pattaya, Thailand 73 kg	Decision	3	3:00
2001-12-27	Win	(Thailand) Thongchailek Tor.Silachai	Chonburi Super 8, Pattaya, Thailand 73 kg	KO (knees)	3	
2001-12-24	Win	(Thailand) Thongchai Sor.Kittichai	WMC "Muay Thai Against Drugs", Koh Samui, Thailand 76 kg	KO (left uppercut)	2	
2001-12-05	Loss	(Albania) Azem Maksutaj	K-1 Fight, Bangkok, Thailand	KO	1	2:15
2001-06-09	Win	(Canada) Lonnie Campbell	CMTA Fight Night "Clash of the Champions", Vancouver, British Columbia79kg	Decision	3	3:00
2001-02-14	Win	(Thailand) Mot-X Sitpholek	Therprassit Stadium, Pattaya, Thailand IMTF World Title Defense 75 kg	KO (knees)	5	
2001-01-10	Win	(Thailand) Wanlop Sor.Sattapand	Therprassit Stadium, Pattaya, Thailand IMTF World Title 75 kg	Decision	5	3:00
2000-11-12	Win	(Thailand) Thongsak B.K.S.	Nee Chanpuek, Chiang Mai, Thailand 74 kg	TKO (threw in towel)	3	
2000-08-26	Win	(Canada) Scott Clark	Schanks Athletic Club, Calgary, Alberta 80 kg	Decision	3	3:00
2000-03-18	Win	(Canada) Mehdi Pouroskoui	West Vancouver, Vancouver, British Columbia 77 kg	Decision	5	3:00
2000-01-22	Win	(United States) Jason Hensen	Canada VS America Kickboxing, Marquette, USA 76 kg	KO (left uppercut)	2	

== See also ==
- List of male kickboxers
