= Ondřej Hutník =

Czech kickboxer

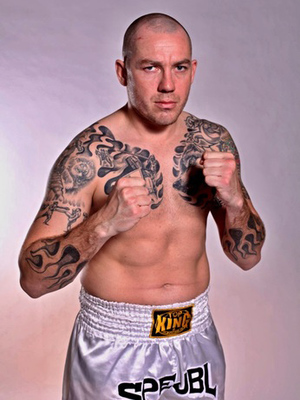
- Born: Ondřej Hutník; 19 February 1983 (age 43); Líbeznice, Czechoslovakia
- Other names: Spejbl
- Nationality: Czech
- Height: 1.88 m (6 ft 2 in)
- Weight: 95 kg (209 lb; 15.0 st)
- Division: Cruiserweight; Heavyweight
- Style: Muay Thai, kickboxing
- Fighting out of: Prague, Czech Republic
- Team: Spejbl Gym
- Trainer: Michal Vančura, Karel Vrtiška
- Years active: 2000–2019

Kickboxing record
- Total: 104
- Wins: 89
- By knockout: 25
- Losses: 13
- Draws: 1
- No contests: 1

Other information
- Website: http://www.ondrahutnik.cz/index_en.php
- Last updated on: 21 December 2013

Ondřej Hutník (born 19 February 1983) is a retired Czech Muay Thai kickboxer. He is a former SUPERKOMBAT Super Cruiserweight Championship title challenger.

== Biography and career ==
On 30 December 2011, Hutník defeated Mohamed Boubkari and Frank Munoz, respectively, to win the Enfusion Kickboxing Tournament '11 at -95 kg in Prague, Czech Republic.

He defeated Pacome Assi by unanimous decision at Nitrianska Noc Bojovnikov in Nitra, Slovakia on 27 October 2012.

On 9 November 2013, he defeated Massinissa Hamaili in a SUPERKOMBAT Super Cruiserweight Title Eliminator bout.

He challenged Andrei Stoica for the vacant SUPERKOMBAT Super Cruiserweight Championship (-95 kg/209 lb) at the SUPERKOMBAT World Grand Prix 2013 Final in Galați, Romania on 21 December, losing by unanimous decision.

On 19 November 2016 in Marseille, France Ondrej Hutnik defeats Fabrice Aurieng by KO in round 4 with spinning backfist and becomes a new World Kickboxing Network super heavyweight world champion (oriental rules). The challenged title was previously owned by Jerome Le Banner who vacated the belt after retirement in 2015.

On 27 July 2017 Hutnik defeated Sergej Maslobojev of Lithuania via decision and won a vacant WKN European heavyweight title at Yangames Fight Night in Prague, Czech Republic.

== Doping suspension ==
On 21 December 2017, it was announced that Hutník failed a drug test in 2016 prior to La Nuit des Champions, testing positive for the banned substance hydroxystanozolol. He received a 4 years suspension by the National Anti-Doping Agency of France (AFLD) from the participation in all sports events organized or authorized by French sports federations until 5 January 2022. As a result, his KO win against Fabrice Aurieng was reverted to a no contest.

== Titles ==
Professional:

- W5 Professional Kickboxing
  - 2017 W5 European Light Heavyweight Champion
- World Kickboxing Network
  - 2017 WKN European Oriental Rules Heavyweight Champion
- World Independent Promoters Union
  - 2013 W.I.P.U. "King of the Ring" K-1 Rules Heavyweight World Championship (-95 kg)
- World Full Contact Association
  - 2012 W.F.C.A. European Heavyweight -95 kg Champion
  - 2007 W.F.C.A. Kickboxing Cruiserweight World Champion -86 kg, Lisbon
- Enfusion
  - 2011 Enfusion Kickboxing Tournament Champion
- K-1
  - 2006 Czech Muay Thai Champion
- It's Showtime
  - 2006 It's Showtime 75MAX Trophy runner up
  - 2005 It's Showtime Prague Pool A Champion
- Windy Cup
  - 2005 Windy Cup Winner

Amateur:

- 2010 I.F.M.A. World Champion (gold) -91 kg
- 2006 I.F.M.A. European Cup Champion (gold)
- 2004 I.F.M.A. World Vice Champion (silver)
- 2002 I.F.M.A. European Cup Champion (gold)
- 2001 W.K.A. World Champion (gold)
- 2000 I.F.M.A. World Champion (gold)

== Fight record ==
Professional Muay Thai kickboxing record
89 wins (56 (T)KOs), 13 losses, 1 draw, 1 no contest
| Date | Result | Opponent | Event | Location | Method | Round | Time |
| 2019-03-29 | Win | (Portugal) Bruno Susano | XFN Legends | Prague, Czech Republic | Decision (unanimous) | 3 | |
| 2018-05-04 | Win | (Czech Republic) Petr Vondráček | Heroes Gate 20 | Prague, Czech Republic | Decision (unanimous) | 3 | |
Wins the Heroes Gate Heavyweight title.
| 2017-11-11 | Win | (Slovenia) Miran Fabjan | W5 Fortune Favors the Brave | Košice, Slovakia | TKO | 4 | |
| 2017-07-27 | Win | (Lithuania) Sergej Maslobojev | Yangames Fight Night 2017 | Prague, Czech Republic | Decision (majority) | 3 | |
Wins the WKN European Oriental Rules Heavyweight Championship 96.6 kg.
| 2017-04-29 | Loss | (Serbia) Rade Opačić | Simply the Best 14 Prague | Prague, Czech Republic | KO (high kick) | 1 | |
| 2016-11-19 | NC | (France) Fabrice Aurieng | Nuit des Champions 2016 | Marseille, France | No contest | 4 | |
For the WKN World Oriental Rules Super Heavyweight Championship and NDC K-1 rules heavyweight +100 kg title. Originally a KO win for Hutník, later ruled a NC after Hutník failed a drug test.
| 2016-10-08 | Win | (Romania) Cătălin Moroșanu | W5 Grand Prix "Legends in Prague" | Prague, Czech Republic | Decision (unanimous) | 3 | 3:00 |
| 2016-04-16 | Win | (France) Nicolas Wamba | Simply the Best 10 | Prague, Czech Republic | KO (punch) | 3 | |
Wins the WKN Intercontinental Oriental Rules Super Heavyweight Championship.
| 2016-03-18 | Win | (Croatia) Toni Čatipović | Heroes Gate 15 | Prague, Czech Republic | Decision (unanimous) | 3 | 3:00 |
| 2015-12-05 | Win | (Switzerland) Janosch Nietlispach | Gibu Fight Night 2 | Prague, Czech Republic | Decision (unanimous) | 3 | 3:00 |
| 2015-10-23 | Win | (Croatia) Toni Milanović | Heroes Gate 15 | Prague, Czech Republic | Decision | 3 | 3:00 |
| 2015-09-26 | Win | (Czech Republic) Jan Soukup | Mistrovství ČR v K1 WAKO pro | Prague, Czech Republic | Decision (unanimous) | 3 | 3:00 |
| 2015-04-10 | Win | (Belarus) Igor Bugaenko | Heroes Gate 14 | Prague, Czech Republic | Decision (unanimous) | 3 | 3:00 |
| 2014-11-30 | Win | (Russia) Mikhail Tyuterev | W5 Crossroad of Times | Bratislava, Slovakia | Decision | 3 | 3:00 |
| 2014-06-12 | Loss | (Democratic Republic of the Congo) Danyo Ilunga | Gibu Fight Night | Prague, Czech Republic | TKO | 3 | |
| 2014-04-26 | Win | (Cape Verde) Eduardo Mendes | Gala Night Thaiboxing/ Enfusion Live 17 | Žilina, Slovakia | TKO (ref. stoppage) | 2 | |
| 2013-12-21 | Loss | (Romania) Andrei Stoica | SUPERKOMBAT World Grand Prix 2013 Final | Galați, Romania | Decision (unanimous) | 3 | 3:00 |
For the vacant SUPERKOMBAT Super Cruiserweight Championship.
| 2013-11-09 | Win | (Algeria) Massinissa Hamaili | SUPERKOMBAT World Grand Prix 2013 Final Elimination | Ploiești, Romania | TKO (injury/broken rib) | 1 | 2:05 |
SUPERKOMBAT Super Cruiserweight Title Eliminator.
| 2013-06-14 | Win | (Germany) Stefan Leko | Time of Gladiator | Brno, Czech Republic | KO (round kick) | 2 | |
Wins W.I.P.U. "King of the Ring" K-1 Rules Heavyweight World Championship.
| 2013-04-27 | Win | (France) Zinedine Hameur-Lain | Gala Night Thaiboxing | Žilina, Slovakia | KO (round kick) | 1 | |
| 2012-12-30 | Win | (Spain) Jorge Loren | Pěsti v Praze | Prague, Czech Republic | Decision (unanimous) | 5 | 3:00 |
Wins W.F.C.A. European Heavyweight -95 kg title.
| 2012-10-27 | Win | (France) Pacome Assi | Nitrianska Noc Bojovnikov | Nitra, Slovakia | Decision (unanimous) | 3 | 3:00 |
| 2012-05-27 | Win | (Albania) Roland Dabinovci | Noc válečníků 4 | Kladno, Czech Republic | Decision (unanimous) | 3 | 3:00 |
| 2012-04-14 | Win | (Germany) Martin Jahn | Souboj Titánů | Plzeň, Czech Republic | TKO | 1 | |
| 2011-12-30 | Win | (Spain) Frank Muñoz | Enfusion Kickboxing Tournament '11, Final | Prague, Czech Republic | Decision (unanimous) | 3 | 3:00 |
Enfusion kickboxing tournament champion.
| 2011-12-30 | Win | (Morocco) Mohamed Boubkari | Enfusion Kickboxing Tournament '11, Semi Finals | Prague, Czech Republic | Decision (unanimous) | 3 | 3:00 |
| 2011-11-19 | Win | (Russia) Shamil Abasov | Souboj Titánů | Plzeň, Czech Republic | | | |
| 2011-05-27 | Win | (Suriname) Redouan Cairo | Grand Prix Chomutov | Chomutov, Czech Republic | Decision (unanimous) | 3 | 3:00 |
| 2011-03-12 | Win | (Russia) Michail Tjuterev | Gala night Thaiboxing | Žilina, Slovakia | Decision | 3 | 3:00 |
| 2011-02-? | Win | (Curaçao) Thiago Martina | Enfusion Kickboxing Tournament '11, 2nd Round | Koh Samui, Thailand | KO (high kick) | 3 | |
Qualifies for Enfusion Kickboxing 2011 Final 4.
| 2011-01-? | Win | (Curaçao) Wendell Roche | Enfusion Kickboxing Tournament '11, 1st Round | Koh Samui, Thailand | Decision | 3 | 3:00 |
| 2010-06-24 | Win | (Germany) James Phillips | W.F.C.A. Prague | Prague, Czech Republic | Decision (unanimous) | 3 | 3:00 |
| 2010-03-20 | Win | (Lithuania) Arnold Oborotov | Gala Night Thaiboxing | Žilina, Slovakia | Decision (unanimous) | 3 | |
| 2010-02-13 | Win | (Turkey) Hakan Aksoy | It's Showtime 2010 Prague | Prague, Czech Republic | Decision (unanimous) | 3 | 3:00 |
| 2009-11-20 | Win | (Sweden) Jonathan Gromark | K-1 Rumble of the Kings 2009 in Stockholm | Stockholm, Sweden | Decision (unanimous) | 3 | 3:00 |
| 2009-08-29 | Win | (Netherlands) Rodney Glunder | It's Showtime 2009 Budapest | Budapest, Hungary | Decision | 3 | 3:00 |
| 2008-11-08 | Win | (Canada) Clifton Brown | Janus Fight Night "The Legend" | Padua, Italy | TKO (doc stop/cut) | 2 | |
| 2008-09-06 | Win | (Morocco) Tarik Charkaoui | It's Showtime 2008 Alkmaar | Alkmaar, Netherlands | TKO (ref stop/liver kick) | 3 | |
| 2008-03-15 | Loss | (Suriname) Tyrone Spong | It's Showtime 75MAX Trophy Final 2008, Title Fight | 's-Hertogenbosch, Netherlands | KO (left liver punch) | 2 | 2:32 |
Fight was for Spong's W.F.C.A. Thai Boxing Cruiserweight World title -86.18 kg.
| 2007-11-30 | Win | (Portugal) Leonildo Evora | Kickboxing Cup 2007 | Lisbon, Portugal | KO | | |
Wins W.F.C.A. Kickboxing Cruiserweight World title -86 kg.
| 2007-06-02 | Loss | (Morocco) Najim Ettouhlali | Gentleman Fight Night IV | Tilburg, Netherlands | Decision | 5 | 3:00 |
| 2007-04-07 | Win | (Turkey) Yücel Fidan | Balans Fight Night | Tilburg, Netherlands | Decision | 5 | 3:00 |
| 2007-03-24 | Win | (Armenia) Karapet Papijan | Fights at the Border presents: It's Showtime Trophy 2007 | Lommel, Belgium | Decision | 3 | 3:00 |
Qualifies for It's Showtime 75MAX Trophy Final 2008 but will later withdraw due to moving up in weight to 86 kg.
| 2006-12-16 | Win | (Czech Republic) Jiří Žák | K-1 Fighting Network Prague Round '07, Title Fight | Prague, Czech Republic | Decision | 5 | 3:00 |
Wins Czech National Muay Thai title 76.2 kg.
| 2006-09-23 | Loss | (Turkey) Şahin Yakut | It's Showtime 75MAX Trophy Final 2006, Final | Rotterdam, Netherlands | Decision | 3 | 3:00 |
Fight was for It's Showtime 75MAX Trophy 2006 -75 kg.
| 2006-09-23 | Win | (Netherlands) Joerie Mes | It's Showtime 75MAX Trophy Final 2006, Semi Finals | Rotterdam, Netherlands | Decision | 3 | 3:00 |
| 2006-09-23 | Win | (Belarus) Dmitry Shakuta | It's Showtime 75MAX Trophy Final 2006, Quarter Finals | Rotterdam, Netherlands | Decision | 3 | 3:00 |
| 2005-12-18 | Win | (Netherlands) Sem Braan | It's Showtime 75MAX Trophy Prague, Pool A Final | Prague, Czech Republic | Decision | 3 | 3:00 |
Wins It's Showtime 75MAX Trophy Prague Pool A Final and qualifies for It's Showtime 75MAX Trophy Final 2006.
| 2005-12-18 | Win | (Czech Republic) Michal Hansgut | It's Showtime 75MAX Trophy Prague, Pool A Semi Finals | Prague, Czech Republic | Decision | 3 | 3:00 |
| 2005-10-30 | Win | (Belgium) Omar Benmahdi | It's Showtime 75MAX Trophy Alkmaar | Alkmaar, Netherlands | Decision (unanimous) | 3 | 3:00 |
| 2005-06-12 | Win | (Netherlands) Sem Braan | It's Showtime 2005 Amsterdam | Amsterdam, Netherlands | Decision | 5 | 3:00 |
| 2004-10-25 | Win | (Netherlands) Sem Braan | Heaven or Hell | Prague, Czech Republic | Decision | 3 | 3:00 |
| 2004-03-14 | Win | (Netherlands) Mehdi Rajaa | Killer Dome V, Bijlmer Sportcentrum | Amsterdam, Netherlands | KO | | |
| 2003-09-28 | Win | (Cape Verde) Alviar Lima | Muay Thai Champions League IX | Rotterdam, Netherlands | Decision (unanimous) | 5 | 3:00 |
| 2003-02-16 | Win | (Netherlands) Rasit Biner | Gala in Schuttersveld | Rotterdam, Netherlands | KO (knee to the liver) | 1 | |
| 2002-12-14 | Loss | (Portugal) José Reis | K-1 Spain MAX 2002, Semi Finals | Barcelona, Spain | TKO (doc stop/cut) | 1 | |
| 2002-12-14 | Win | (Spain) Carlos Heredia | K-1 Spain MAX 2002, Quarter Finals | Barcelona, Spain | Decision | 3 | 3:00 |
| 2001-06-03 | Draw | (England) Kieran Keddle | Amazing Muaythai Fight Night II | Watford, England, UK | Decision draw | 5 | 3:00 |
Legend: Win Loss Draw/no contest Notes

Amateur Muay Thai record
| Date | Result | Opponent | Event | Location | Method | Round | Time |
|---|---|---|---|---|---|---|---|
| 2010-12- | Win | (Belarus) Dzianis Hancharonak | 2010 I.F.M.A. World Muaythai Championships, Finals | Bangkok, Thailand | Decision | 4 | 2:00 |
Wins 2010 IFMA World Championships -91kg Gold Medal.
| 2010-12- | Win | (Ukraine) Tsotne Rogava | 2010 I.F.M.A. World Muaythai Championships, Semi Finals | Bangkok, Thailand | Decision | 4 | 2:00 |
Legend: Win Loss Draw/no contest Notes

== See also ==
- List of It's Showtime events
- List of male kickboxers
