= It's Showtime (kickboxing) =

Kickboxing and mixed martial arts promoter based in Netherlands

- Company type: Private
- Industry: Martial arts promotion
- Founded: 1998
- Founder: Simon Rutz & Edwin van Os
- Fate: Acquired by GLORY
- Headquarters: Amsterdam, Netherlands
- Key people: Simon Rutz and Edwin van Os CEO
- Parent: European Fighting Network
- Website: http://www.itsshowtime.nl/

It's Showtime was a kickboxing and mixed martial arts promotion based in Amsterdam, Netherlands. It was founded by Simon Rutz in 1998 and held its first show in 1999 and its last near the end of 2012. In 2012, the promotion was purchased and merged into GLORY. It's Showtime was the number one kickboxing promotion in the world at its peak.

== History ==
It's Showtime events were cross-promoted with K-1 and other European promotions from Italy, Belgium and England. In December 2007, the first season of It’s Showtime Reality Show was broadcast on Eurosport, featuring 19 fighters from all over the world. K-1 partnership continued until K-1's deepening financial problems and Simon Rutz claimed in January 2011 that some fighters from It's Showtime had not been paid for fights in K-1.

In March 2012, It's Showtime announced that EMCOM Entertainment established the new company K-1 Global Holdings Ltd. in Hong Kong. EMCOM/K-1 Global's agreement with It's Showtime made many fighters under It's Showtime promotion sign contracts to appear in upcoming K-1 Global events.

Its Showtime promotion throughout its history has been the number one promotion in Europe, 2nd in the world behind K-1 and became the number one in the world in its peak prior to June 2012 when the promotion was purchased by Glory Sports International and merged into their new promotion GLORY.

== Broadcast ==
It's Showtime events were usually broadcast live on Setanta Sports, JSports, TV Esporte Interativo and many others and aired on The Fight Network in Canada.

Showtime had also signed a deal with AXS TV (formerly known as HDNet) to air shows.

== Rules ==
Kickboxing fights were conducted under K-1 rules 3 X 3 rounds and title fights 5 X 3. It's Showtime had eight different weight classes MAX 61 kg, MAX 65 kg, MAX 69 kg, MAX 73 kg, MAX 77 kg, MAX 85 kg, MAX 95 kg and Heavyweight.

== See also ==
- List of It's Showtime (kickboxing) events
- List of It's Showtime (kickboxing) champions
- List of kickboxers
