= Alessandro Campagna =

Alessandro Campagna may refer to:

- Alessandro Campagna (kickboxer) (born 1991), Italian welterweight kickboxer
- Alessandro Campagna (water polo) (born 1963), Italian Olympic water polo player
