= Dzhabar Askerov =

Russian kickboxer (born 1986)

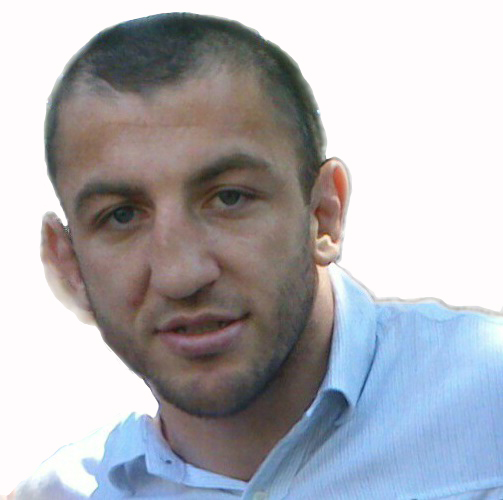
- Askerov in 2015
- Born: January 24, 1986 (age 40); Kurakh, Dagestani ASSR, Soviet Union
- Native name: Джабар Аскеров
- Nationality: Russian
- Height: 5 ft 8 in (1.73 m)
- Weight: 155 lb (70 kg; 11 st)
- Division: Welterweight
- Style: Muay Thai, Kickboxing
- Fighting out of: Melbourne, Australia
- Years active: 2004–present

Professional boxing record
- Total: 1
- Wins: 1
- Losses: 0

Kickboxing record
- Total: 150
- Wins: 111
- By knockout: 56
- Losses: 37
- By knockout: 3
- Draws: 2

Mixed martial arts record
- Total: 4
- Wins: 4
- By knockout: 4
- Losses: 0

Other information
- Website: dzhabar.blogspot.com
- Mixed martial arts record from Sherdog
- Last updated on: December 12, 2022

Dzhabar Askerov (Lezgian: Аскеров Жаббар Мегьамедан хва) (Russian: Джабар Аскеров; born January 24, 1986) is a Russian welterweight kickboxer fighting out of Melbourne, Australia and representing Russia. He is the World Muay Thai Council's Welterweight European Champion and K-1 MAX Scandinavia 2008 Tournament finalist. In 2008, he was a semi-finalist on the reality show The Contender Asia.

== Background ==
Askerov was born in Kurah, Dagestan in an ethnic Lezgin family. When he was six years old, he went to school in Magaramkent and his father took him to a judo gym where he trained for two years. When Askerov was nine years old, his family moved to Derbent. It was his father again who took Askerov to a Muay Thai gym where he fell in love with the sport.

== Career ==
=== Early career ===
Dzhabar had his first professional fight when he was 18, a four-man tournament which he won. A few years later, Askerov moved to Thailand to train with the best at the birthplace of his beloved sport, settling at Rompo Gym in Bangkok. In November 2012 he moved to Melbourne, Australia and began training at Fighters Xpress with trainer Peter Hatton.

Dzhabar made his K-1 debut on March 17, 2007, at the K-1 MAX East European Tournament against Muay Thai superstar Buakaw Por. Pramuk and lost the fight by unanimous decision.

=== The Contender Asia ===
In 2008 Dzhabar took part in The Contender Asia reality show. He was part of the Tiger Kings team and reached the semi-finals where he was defeated by John Wayne Parr.

=== Post-Contender ===
Askerov was signed by Thai boxing company Yokkao in 2012 as a sponsored fighter. He faced Buakaw Banchamek (then-Buakaw Por Pramuk) at the main event for Yokkao Extreme 2012 on January 21, 2012, in Milan, Italy. Askerov lost by points to Buakaw after the 3-round battle.

He was expected to face Yoshihiro Sato in a tournament reserve bout at Glory 3: Rome - 2012 Middleweight Slam Final 8 on November 3, 2012, in Rome, Italy. However, Sato was given a place in the tournament when Albert Kraus pulled out with the flu and Warren Stevelmans instead stepped in against Askerov. Stevelmans beat him by unanimous decision.

He defeated Mohamed El Mir by TKO when El Mir was injured checking a low kick in round three at Rumble of the Kings 2012 on November 16, 2012, in Linköping, Sweden.

He was expected to fight Steve Moxon at Kings of Kombat 8 on December 8, 2012, in Melbourne, Australia but withdrew from the bout and was replaced by Mostafa Abdollahi.

He was awarded a highly disputed decision over 20-year-old German Enriko Kehl at NewFC: Battle of the Stars in Dagestan on December 22, 2012.

Askerov took possibly the biggest win of his career on January 26, 2013, when he defeated the legendary Andy Souwer by split decision at Yokkao Extreme 2013 in Milan, Italy.

Askerov was expected to face Toby Smith at Domination 10 in Perth, Australia on March 9, 2013 but the bout was cancelled when the two men could not agree over the rule-set; Smith wanted to fight under Muay Thai rules, while Askerov preferred kickboxing.

Askerov lost to Steve Moxon via split decision at Kings of Kombat 9 in Melbourne on April 27, 2013. In June 2014 Askerov took the revenge defeating Moxon by decision.

He was expected to face Mike Zambidis in the semi-finals of the Legend Fighting Show -71 kg tournament in Moscow, Russia on May 25, 2013. However, Zambidis was replaced by Enriko Gogokhia. After dispatching Gogokhia with what Fight Sport Asia described as "one of the nastiest 70kg knockouts in recent history", he faced Alim Nabiev in the final. He outclassed Nabiev, who was filling in for the injured Artur Kyshenko, and stopped him with low kicks in round three to take the tournament crown.

Askerov defeated Yoshihiro Sato by unanimous decision at Tech-Krep FC: Southern Front 2 in Kyiv, Ukraine on December 8, 2013.

On April 5, 2014, Askerov was scheduled to fight Artur Kyshenko at Legend 3: Pour Homme in Milan, Italy, but the Ukrainian withdrew from the fight, conceding that he would be unable to make the contracted weight of -71 kg/156 lb, and was replaced by his stablemate Murthel Groenhart. Askerov lost to Groenhart, getting dropped with a right hook before being put away with a left hook inside the opening round.

On December 15, 2015, he was ranked the #8 lightweight in the world by LiverKick.com.

On March 28, 2025, he had his last professional bout against Danish-Palestinian Muay Thai fighter 'El Mir' at the inaugural event for the 'Muay Thai Russian series' defeating El Mir by TKO from a leg kick in the first round.

== Titles ==
=== Professional ===
- Alpha Fight Series
  - 2019 Alpha Fight Series World Champion (-70 kg)
- Russian Challenge
  - 2017 Russian Challenge World Champion (-71 kg)
  - 2016 Russian Сhallenge World Champion (-71 kg)
- Legend Fighting Show
  - 2013 Legend Fighting Show 71 kg Tournament Champion
  - 2012 W5 European Champion 71 kg
- International Amateur Kickboxing Sport Association
  - 2012 IAKSA European Champion-72.5 kg.
- Fights by TNA Rules
  - 2011 Fights by TNA RULES TNA World Cup –70 kg
  - 2010 Fights by TNA RULES TNA World Cup –70 kg
- World Muaythai Council (WMC)
  - 2008 WMC Muay Thai Middleweight European Champion –72.5 kg
  - 2006 W.M.C./S1 Kings Cup runner up –72 kg
  - 2005 W.M.C. "Muay Thai Against Drugs" Tournament World Champion
- Shoot Boxing / S-Cup
  - 2008 S-Cup 2008 Europe Shootboxing Tournament runner up –70 kg
- K-1
  - 2008 K-1 Scandinavia MAX tournament runner up –70 kg
  - 2006 K-1 Russia MAX runner up –70 kg
- World version W5
  - 2008 Wins the WMC Welterweight European Championship Title -71 kg
- Patong Stadium
  - 2005 Patong Stadium Muaythai Super Welterweight Champion -68 kg
- PK-1
  - 2004 PK-1 World Champion

=== Amateur ===
- 2003 I.F.M.A. World Muay Thai Championships (bronze) -57 kg
- 2000 Pancration World Junior Championship (gold)
- 1999 Muaythai World Junior Championship (gold)

== Professional boxing record ==
1 fight	1 win	0 losses
By decision	1	0

No.	Result	Record	Opponent	Type	Round, time	Date	Location	Notes
1	Win	1–0	Michael Mora	UD	6	6 Aug 2016	(Germany) Moscow, Russia	

== Karate Combat record ==
Professional record breakdown
1 match	0 wins	1 loss
By knockout	0	1

Res.	Record	Opponent	Method	Event	Date	Round	Time	Location	Notes
Loss	0–1	Award Kazimba	TKO (punches)	Karate Combat 49	September 18, 2024	2	0:40	Marina Bay, Singapore	

== Professional kickboxing and Muay Thai record ==
Professional kickboxing record
110 wins (55 (T)KOs, 54 decision) 38 losses, 2 draw, no contest
Date	Result	Opponent	Event	Location	Method	Round	Time
2023-10-28	Loss	(Russia) Mamuka Usubyan	RCC Fair Fight XXIII	Yekaterinburg, Russia	Decision (unanimous)	3	3:00
2023-03-12	Loss	(Japan) Masaaki Noiri	K-1 World GP 2023: K'Festa 6	Tokyo, Japan	KO (right straight)	1	2:00
2022-04-09	Win	(Samoa) Jonathan Aiulu	Warriors Way 25: GP Fight Night	Melbourne, Australia	Decision (split)	3	3:00
2019-12-13	Win	(Papua New Guinea) Jonathan Tuhu	Alpha Fight Series	Melbourne, Australia	TKO	4	2:42
Won The Alpha Fight Series World (-70 kg) Championship.
2019-08-16	Loss	(France) Samy Sana	ONE Championship: Dreams of Gold	Bangkok, Thailand	Decision (majority)	3	3:00
Kickboxing Featherweight Grand-Prix Semi-Finals.
2019-05-17	Win	(Germany) Enriko Kehl	ONE Championship: Enter the Dragon	Kallang, Singapore	Decision (unanimous)	3	3:00
Kickboxing Featherweight Grand-Prix Quarter-Finals.
2018-04-20	Win	(Russia) Ergali Urbulatov	ACB KB 15: Grand Prix Kitek	Moscow, Russia	Decision (unanimous)	3	3:00
2017-10-07	Loss	(Thailand) Sitthichai Sitsongpeenong	Wu Lin Feng - Yi Long challenge Tournament, Final	Zhengzhou, Henan, China	Decision (unanimous)	3	3:00
2017-08-05	Loss	(Belarus) Chingiz Allazov	Wu Lin Feng - Yi Long challenge Tournament Semi-finals	Zhengzhou, China	Decision (unanimous)	3	3:00
2017-05-06	Win	(Colombia) Christopher Mena	Wu Lin Feng - Yi Long challenge Tournament 1/4 finals 2	Zhengzhou, Henan, China	KO (left cross)	1	2:43
2017-03-19	Win	(Denmark) Rhassan Muhareb	Russian Сhallenge 3	Moscow, Russia	Ext.R decision (unanimous)	4	3:00
Defends Russian Сhallenge World Championship Title (-71 kg).
2016-11-13	Win	(Iran) Mohamed Reza Nazari	Russian Сhallenge 2 Grand Prix Moscow	Moscow, Russia	TKO (corner stoppage)	2	3:00
Won The Russian Сhallenge World (-71 kg) Championship.
2016-10-30	Loss	(Belarus) Dzianis Zuev	Kunlun Fight 54 - Super Fight	Wuhan, China	Ext.R decision (unanimous)	4	3:00
2016-05-14	Loss	(Belgium) Yassin Baitar	Kunlun Fight 44 - Four Man Tournament, Semi-finals	Khabarovsk, Russia	Decision (unanimous)	3	3:00
2016-03-25	Draw	(South Africa) Warren Stevelmans	Kunlun Fight 40	Tongling, China	Extension round decision	4	3:00
2016-01-23	Win	(Thailand) Aikpracha Meenayothin	Kunlun Fight 37 – World Max 2015 Reserve Fight	Sanya, China	KO (right hook)	2	2:12
2015-10-31	Loss	(Thailand) Yodsanklai Fairtex	Kunlun Fight 33 – World Max 2015 Final 16	Changde, China	Decision	3	3:00
2015-08-15	Win	(China) Liu Mingzhi	Kunlun Fight 29 - Middleweight Tournament, Final	Sochi, Russia	TKO (3 knockdowns/low kicks)	1	2:05
Qualified to Kunlun fight 2015 70kg World MAX Tournament Final 16.
2015-08-15	Win	(Germany) Enriko Kehl	Kunlun Fight 29 - Middleweight Tournament, Semi-finals	Sochi, Russia	KO (right hook)	2	2:19
2015-02-26	Win	(Thailand) Nonsai Sor.Sanyakorn	Grand Prix Russia Open Vol. 16	Moscow, Russia	Decision (unanimous)	3	3:00
2014-11-30	Loss	(Brazil) Cosmo Alexandre	W5 Crossroad of Times, Semi-finals	Bratislava, Slovakia	Decision (unanimous)	3	3:00
2014-06-07	Win	(Australia) Steve Moxon	Moment of Truth	Keysborough, Australia	Decision (unanimous)	5	3:00
2014-04-05	Loss	(Netherlands) Murthel Groenhart	Legend 3: Pour Homme	Milan, Italy	KO (left hook)	1	2:08
2013-12-08	Win	(Japan) Yoshihiro Sato	Tech-Krep FC: Soldiers of the Empire	Kyiv, Ukraine	Decision (unanimous)	3	3:00
2013-10-04	Win	(Germany) Marco Groh	Tech-Krep FC: Southern Front 2	Krasnodar, Russia	Decision (unanimous)	3	3:00
2013-05-25	Win	(Azerbaijan) Alim Nabiev	Legend Fighting Show, Final	Moscow, Russia	KO (left low kick)	3	1:32
Wins the Legend Fighting Show -71kg tournament title.
2013-05-25	Win	(Ukraine) Enriko Gogokhia	Legend Fighting Show, Semi-finals	Moscow, Russia	KO (left hook)	2	2:18
2013-04-27	Loss	(Australia) Steve Moxon	Kings of Kombat 9	Melbourne, Australia	Decision (split)	3	3:00
2013-03-16	Win	(New Zealand) Ben Sisam	Night of Mayhem 6, Pro Boxing	Melbourne, Australia	Decision (unanimous)	4	3:00
2013-03-02	Win	(Morocco) Mohammed Medhar	Tech-KREP FC 1 – Southern Front	Kransnodar, Russia	Decision (unanimous)	3	3:00
2013-01-26	Win	(Netherlands) Andy Souwer	Yokkao Extreme 2013	Milan, Italy	Decision (split)	3	3:00
2012-12-22	Win	(Germany) Enriko Kehl	NewFC: Battle of the Stars	Makhachkala, Russia	Decision	3	3:00
Wins the W5 Welterweight European Championship Title -71 Kg
2012-11-16	Win	(Denmark) Mohamed El Mir	Rumble of the Kings 2012	Linköping, Sweden	TKO (leg injury)	3	0:46
2012-11-03	Loss	(South Africa) Warren Stevelmans	Glory 3: Rome - 70 kg Slam Tournament, Reserve Bout	Rome, Italy	Decision (unanimous)	3	3:00
2012-09-15	Win	(Australia) Mike Dimitriou	Night of MAYHEM-5	Melbourne, Australia	KO	1	0:45
2012-06-07	Win	(Russia) Danila Utenkov	Fight Nights-7	Moscow, Russia	TKO	2	2:56
2012-05-26	Loss	(Netherlands) Robin van Roosmalen	Glory 1: Stockholm - 70 kg Slam Tournament, First Round	Stockholm, Sweden	Decision	3	3:00
2012-04-05	Win	(Netherlands) Mandela Antone	Tatneft Cup quarter final	Kazan, Russia	TKO	2	2:00
2012-03-23	Win	(Estonia) Maxim Vorovski	United Glory 15	Moscow, Russia	Ex.round. decision	4	3:00
2012-03-08	Win	(France) Jeremy Sportouch	Fight Nights 6	Moscow, Russia	Decision	3	3:00
2012-02-25	Win	(Russia) Ramzan Magomadov	IAKSA Event	Derbent, Russia	TKO	2	1:00
Wins the 2012 IAKSA European Championship -72.5 kg.
2012-01-21	Loss	(Thailand) Buakaw Por. Pramuk	Yokkao Extreme 2012	Milan, Italy	Decision	3	3:00
2011-11-27	Win	(Morocco) Chahid Oulad El Hadj	Rumble of the Kings 2011	Stockholm, Sweden	TKO (retirement)	1	1:07
2011-11-12	Win	(Russia) Maxim Smirnov	Tatneft Cup 2011 Final	Kazan, Russia	KO (knee)	3	1:43
Wins TatNeft Arena World Cup 2011 Final
2011-07-23	Win	(Ukraine) Enriko Gogokhia	Tatneft Cup 2011 1/2 final	Kazan, Russia	Decision	4	3:00
2011-04-28	Win	(Austria) Martin Anwar	Tatneft Cup 2011 2nd selection 1/4 final	Kazan, Russia	TKO (3 knockdowns/low kicks)	2	
2011-04-09	Loss	(Greece) Mike Zambidis	W5 Grand Prix K.O, Final	Moscow, Russia	Decision (unanimous)	3	3:00
Fight was for W5 World Grand Prix KO world title -71 kg
2011-04-09	Win	(Netherlands) William Diender	W5 Grand Prix K.O, Semi-final	Moscow, Russia	Decision (unanimous)	3	3:00
2011-03-12	Win	(Netherlands) Chris van Venrooij	Oktagon 2011 in Milan	Milan, Italy	KO (left hooks)	1	1:46
2011-01-22	Win	(Italy) Ricardo Lecca	KnocKOut - Oktagon K-1	Rome, Italy	KO	1	
2010-12-19	Win	(Russia) Daud Arapiev	Tatneft Cup 2011 1st selection 1/8 final	Kazan, Russia	KO (left hook)	1	3:00
2010-11-27	Win	(United States) William Sriyapai	K-1 Scandinavia Rumble of the Kings 2010	Stockholm, Sweden	TKO	2	1:32
2010-10-20	Win	(Kyrgyzstan) Uranbek Essenkulov	TatNeft Arena World Cup 2010, Final	Kazan, Russia	Decision	6	2:00
Wins TatNeft Arena World Cup 2010 Final -70 kg.
2010-09-24	Loss	(Australia) Greg Foley	JabOut Presents QUEST	Sydney, Australia	Decision	3	3:00
2010-07-29	Win	(Armenia) Armen Israelyan	TatNeft Arena World Cup 2010, Semi-finals	Kazan, Russia	KO (low kick)	3	
2010-05-29	Win	(Netherlands) William Diender	It's Showtime 2010 Amsterdam	Amsterdam, Netherlands	Ext.R decision (5-0)	4	3:00
2010-04-30	Win	(Russia) Danila Utenkov	TatNeft Arena World Cup 2010, Quarter-finals	Kazan, Russia	TKO (ref stop/gave up)	4	1:46
2010-03-13	Loss	(Italy) Armen Petrosyan	Oktagon presents: It's Showtime 2010	Milan, Italy	Decision	3	3:00
2010-01-31	Win	(Lithuania) Tadas Jonkus	TatNeft Arena World Cup 2010, 1st round	Kazan, Russia	KO (low kicks)	3	
2010-01-16	Loss	(Thailand) Nonsai Sor.Sanyakorn	Thailand vs Challenger Series	Bangkok, Thailand	Decision	5	3:00
2009-11-20	Loss	(Greece) Mike Zambidis	War of the Worlds	Melbourne, Australia	Decision (majority)	5	3:00
2009-08-29	Loss	(Brazil) Cosmo Alexandre	Evolution 17	Brisbane, Australia	Decision (unanimous)	3	3:00
2009-07-13	Win	(Japan) Hinata Watanabe	K-1 World MAX 2009 Final 8, Super Fight	Tokyo, Japan	Ext.R decision (unanimous)	4	3:00
2009-04-21	Loss	(Italy) Giorgio Petrosyan	K-1 World MAX 2009 Final 16	Fukuoka, Japan	KO (left knee strike)	3	0:49
Fails to qualify for K-1 World MAX 2009 Final 8 although he will be invited to take part in a super fight.
2009-02-27	Loss	(Sweden) Marcus Öberg	K-1 Rumble of the Kings Norrköping 2009	Norrköping, Sweden	Ext.R decision (unanimous)	4	3:00
2008-12-06	Win	(Australia) Bruce Macfie	Evolution 15 "The Contender Qualifier"	Brisbane, Australia	KO (right overhand)	1	2:30
2008-11-06	Win	(Netherlands) Chris van Venrooij	Hong Kong Contender	Hong Kong	Decision (split)	5	3:00
2008-10-31	Win	(Germany) Denis Schneidmiller	K-1 Scandinavia Rumble of the Kings 2008	Luleå, Sweden	Decision (unanimous)	5	3:00
Wins vacant W.M.C. Muay Thai Middleweight European title -72.5 kg.
2008-09-20	Loss	(Germany) Denis Schneidmiller	S-Cup Europe 2008, Final	Gorinchem, Netherlands	Decision (split)	3	3:00
Fight was for S-Cup Europe 2008 title -70 kg. Fails to qualify for Shoot Boxing World Tournament 2008.
2008-09-20	Win	(Netherlands) Chris van Venrooij	S-Cup Europe 2008, Semi-finals	Gorinchem, Netherlands	Decision (unanimous)	3	3:00
2008-09-20	Win	(Slovakia) Rudolf Durica	S-Cup Europe 2008, Quarter-finals	Gorinchem, Netherlands	Decision (unanimous)	3	3:00
2008-09-16	Loss	(Australia) John Wayne Parr	Evolution 14 "The Contenders"	Brisbane, Australia	Decision (unanimous)	5	3:00
2008-05-31	Loss	(Sweden) Marcus Öberg	K-1 Scandinavia MAX 2008, Final	Stockholm, Sweden	TKO (ref stop/cut)	3	0:34
Fight was for K-1 Scandinavia MAX 2008 title -70 kg.
2008-05-31	Win	(Suriname) Marco Piqué	K-1 Scandinavia MAX 2008, Semi-finals	Stockholm, Sweden	Ext.R decision (unanimous)	4	3:00
2008-05-31	Win	(New Zealand) Jordan Tai	K-1 Scandinavia MAX 2008, Quarter-finals	Stockholm, Sweden	TKO (eye injury)	2	0:41
2008-04-12	Win	(France) Rafik Bakkouri	The Contender Asia Finale, Super Fight	Singapore	Decision	5	3:00
Won the WMC Welterweight European Championship Title -71 Kg
2007-12-29	Win	(Thailand) Eik The Dragon	Kedah Muaythai Challenge	Kulim, Malaysia	KO (spinning back kick)	1	
2007-12-05	Loss	(France) Jonathan Camara	King's Birthday 2007, Semi-finals	Bangkok, Thailand	Decision	3	3:00
2007-12-05	Win	(Republic of Ireland) Jamie Crawford	King's Birthday 2007, Quarter-finals	Bangkok, Thailand	KO	2	
2007-10-?	Loss	(Australia) John Wayne Parr	The Contender Asia, Episode 14, 3rd round	Singapore	Decision (unanimous)	5	3:00
Fails to qualify for The Contender Asia Finale although will be invited to take part in a super fight.
2007-10-?	Win	(Australia) Soren Monkongtong	The Contender Asia, Episode 12, 2nd round	Singapore	KO (right overhand)	1	
2007-09-?	Win	(England) David Paquette	The Contender Asia, Episode 6, 1st round	Singapore	Decision	5	3:00
2007-03-17	Loss	(Thailand) Buakaw Por. Pramuk	K-1 East Europe MAX 2007	Vilnius, Lithuania	Decision (unanimous)	3	3:00
2006-12-27	Loss	(Thailand) Wanlop Sitpholek	Sitpholek Muaythai Promotion	Pattaya, Thailand	Decision	5	3:00
2006-12-05	Loss	(Thailand) Wanlop Sitpholek	King's Birthday 2006, Final	Bangkok, Thailand	Decision	3	3:00
Fight was for W.M.C./S1 King's Cup tournament title -72 kg.
2006-12-05	Win	(Thailand) Jomhod Kiatadisak	King's Birthday 2006, Semi-finals	Bangkok, Thailand	Decision	3	3:00
2006-07-26	Loss	(Belarus) Vitaly Gurkov	S-1 European Championships: Tsunami 2, Quarter-finals	Kaliningrad, Russia	Decision (unanimous)	3	3:00
2006-03-17	Loss	(Russia) Sergei Makagonov	K-1 Russia MAX 2006, Final	Kaliningrad, Russia	Decision	3	3:00
Fight was for K-1 Russia MAX 2006 title -70 kg.
2006-03-17	Win	(Russia) Azamat Abdulazizov	K-1 Russia MAX 2006, Semi-finals	Kaliningrad, Russia	Decision (unanimous)	3	3:00
2006-03-17	Win	(Latvia) Sandris Tomsons	K-1 Russia MAX 2006, Quarter-finals	Kaliningrad, Russia	Decision (unanimous)	3	3:00
2005-08-27	Win	(Thailand)	Muay Thai Against Drugs	Pattaya, Thailand			
Wins W.M.C. "Muay Thai Against Drugs" world title.
2004-12-28	Win	(Russia) Sergey Shurko	R.M.T.L. - Turuk vs Pashayev	Moscow, Russia	Decision (unanimous)	5	3:00
2004-12-07	Win	(Russia) Alexey Makaryev	R.M.T.L. - Makaryev vs Askerov	Moscow, Russia	Decision (unanimous)	5	3:00
2004-11-09	Win	(Russia) Vitaly Bolshanin	R.M.T.L. - Isaev vs Makaryev	Moscow, Russia	Decision (unanimous)	5	3:00
2004-10-05	Win	(Belarus) Rostislav Mekto	R.M.T.L. - Mekto vs Askerov	Moscow, Russia	KO	3	
Legend: Win Loss Draw/no contest Notes

== Mixed martial arts record ==
Professional record breakdown
4 matches	4 wins	0 losses
By knockout	4	0

Res.	Record	Opponent	Method	Event	Date	Round	Time	Location	Notes
Win	4–0	Jonathan Tuhu	KO (punch)	Hex Fight Series 23	August 5, 2022	2	0:25	Melbourne, Australia	
Win	3–0	Jean Michel Mbok	TKO (punches)	OFS - Octagon Fighting Sensation 6	November 20, 2015	1	3:08	Moscow, Russia	
Win	2–0	Roman Gundarenko	KO	Tech-Krep FC - Prime Selection 3	July 8, 2015	2	0:25	Krasnodar, Russia	
Win	1–0	Gazimirza Gaziteev	TKO (doctor stoppage)	Oplot Challenge 109 - Oplot Counterattack	April 18, 2015	2	5:00	Moscow, Russia	

== See also ==
- The Contender Asia
- List of K-1 champions
- List of male kickboxers
