= Luís Reis =

Portuguese Muay Thai kickboxer

- Born: October 1, 1980 (age 46)
- Other names: Dinga
- Nationality: (Portugal) Portuguese; Cape Verde
- Height: 1.80 m (5 ft 11 in)
- Weight: 73 kg (161 lb; 11.5 st)
- Division: Welterweight; Middleweight
- Style: Muay Thai, Kickboxing
- Fighting out of: Lisbon, Portugal
- Team: Olival Gym

Kickboxing record
- Total: 54
- Wins: 40
- Losses: 12
- Draws: 2

Other information
- Notable relatives: José Reis - brother
- Last updated on: April 20, 2013

Luís "Dinga" Reis (born 1 October 1980) is a Portuguese Muay Thai kickboxer of Cape Verdian descent fighting out of Lisbon, Portugal for the Olival Gym. He is a K-1 MAX and It's Showtime regional champion who has also won medals for Portugal at amateur level. His older brother José Reis is also a respected kickboxer.

== Biography and career ==
After a relatively successful amateur career where he had won a number of Iberian championships and several podium finishes at various W.A.K.O world and European championships, Luis made his K-1 debut in 2004. In a rather bizarre tournament appearance he made it to the semi-finals at the MAX event in Lisbon as an injury replacement only to face his older brother José who showed little brotherly love by promptly stopped him in the second round. Luis had more success at the next regional MAX event across the border in Spain, stopping his two opponents before losing to home fighter Abrahan Roqueñi in the final.

After his MAX appearances Luis joined the (then) fledgling Thai & Kickbox SuperLeague in 2005 but had little success in his two matches with the promotion losing both by decision. A return to K-1 MAX in 2006 resulted in a tournament victory in his hometown of Lisbon although the regional win would not mean a place at that year's K-1 MAX final. He encountered the same issue later that year with the It's Showtime organization winning their 75MAX tournament in Portugal but failing to be invited to the final to be held in the Netherlands the following year. In 2009 he won another tournament in his home town, this time winning the World Kickboxing Network (W.K.N.) eight man K-1 rules tournament.

On December 15, 2012, he lost to the eventual tournament winner Karim Ghajji on points in the semi-finals of the WKN 75 kg Full Contact European Grand Prix at Full Night 6 in Agde, France.

He lost to Bakari Tounkara on points at FK-ONE in Paris, France, on April 20, 2013.

== Titles ==
Professional

- 2009 W.K.N. Grand Prix Portugal K-1 rules tournament -74 kg
- 2007 It's Showtime 75MAX Trophy Portugal tournament champion -75 kg
- 2006 K-1 MAX Portugal tournament champion -70 kg
- 2004 K-1 MAX Spain tournament runner up -70 kg

Amateur

- 2006 W.A.K.O. European Championships in Lisbon, Portugal (silver) -71 kg (Full-Contact)
- 2004 Iberian Kickboxing Championships (gold)
- 2003 W.A.K.O. World Championships in Yalta, Ukraine (silver) (Low-Kick)
- 2003 Iberian Kickboxing Championships (gold)
- 2002 W.A.K.O. European Championships in Jesolo, Italy (silver) -67 kg (Low-Kick)
- 2001 W.A.K.O. World Championships in Belgrade, Serbia & Montenegro (bronze) -67 kg (Low-Kick)
- 2001 Iberian Kickboxing Championships (gold)

== Professional kickboxing record ==
Professional Kickboxing Record
40 Wins, 12 Losses, 2 Draws
Date	Result	Opponent	Event	Location	Method	Round	Time
2013-04-20	Loss	(France) Bakari Tounkara	FK-ONE	Paris, France	Decision	3	3:00
2012-12-15	Loss	(France) Karim Ghajji	Full Night 6, 2012 WKN 75 kg Full Contact European Grand Prix Semi-finals	Agde, France	Decision	3	3:00
2009-07-04	Win	(Portugal) José Veiga	W.K.N. Grand Prix Portugal, Final	Lisbon, Portugal	Ext.R Decision (Unanimous)	4	3:00
Wins W.K.N. Grand Prix Portugal K-1 rules tournament -74 kg.
2009-07-04	Win	(Portugal) Fabio Texeira	W.K.N. Grand Prix Portugal, Semi-final	Lisbon, Portugal	TKO (Doc Stop)	1	
2009-07-04	Win	(Morocco) Hicham Bettaini	W.K.N. Grand Prix Portugal, Quarter-final	Lisbon, Portugal	KO	1	
2009-02-27	Win	(Spain) Emad Kadycar	Casino Estoril - Spaceboxing	Estoril, Portugal	Decision	3	3:00
2008-09-20	Loss	(Germany) Denis Schneidmiller	S-Cup Europe 2008, Semi-final	Gorinchem, Netherlands	Decision	3	3:00
2008-09-20	Win	(Sweden) Joakim Karlsson	S-Cup Europe 2008, Quarter-final	Gorinchem, Netherlands	Decision	3	3:00
2008-03-15	Loss	(Italy) Giorgio Petrosyan	It's Showtime 75 Trophy Final, Super Fight	's-Hertogenbosch, Netherlands	Decision (Unanimous)	3	3:00
2008-01-29	Loss	(Armenia) Gago Drago	Kickboxing Champions League	Lisbon, Portugal	Decision (Split)	3	3:00
2007-09-23	Win	(Portugal) Ricardo Fernandes	It's Showtime 75MAX Trophy Portugal, Final	Vilamoura, Portugal	Decision	3	3:00
Wins It's Showtime 75MAX Trophy 2007 Portugal tournament -75 kg.
2007-09-23	Win	(Spain) Daniel Gomez	It's Showtime 75MAX Trophy Portugal, Semi-final	Vilamoura, Portugal	Decision	3	3:00
2007-09-23	Win	(Italy) Fabrizio Donato	It's Showtime 75MAX Trophy Portugal, Quarter-final	Vilamoura, Portugal	Decision	3	3:00
2007-04-05	Loss	(France) Yohan Lidon	Steko's Fight Night 24, 3rd Place	Pforzheim, Germany	Decision (Unanimous)	3	3:00
2007-04-05	Loss	(Suriname) Marco Piqué	Steko's Fight Night 24, Semi-finals	Pforzheim, Germany	Decision (Unanimous)	3	3:00
2006-06-31	Win	(Portugal) Ricardo Fernandes	K-1 MAX Portugal 2006, Final	Lisbon, Portugal	Ext.R TKO	4	2:00
Wins K-1 MAX Portugal 2006 tournament -70 kg.
2006-06-31	Win	(France) Mohamed Diaby	K-1 MAX Portugal 2006, Semi-final	Lisbon, Portugal	Decision (Unanimous)	3	3:00
2006-06-31	Win	(Portugal) Jose Barradas	K-1 MAX Portugal 2006, Quarter-final	Lisbon, Portugal	Decision (Unanimous)	3	3:00
2006-06-17	Draw	(Spain) Abraham Roqueñi	Apocalipsis I	Bilbao, Spain	Decision	5	2:00
2005-11-19	Loss	(Netherlands) Chris van Venrooij	SuperLeague Portugal 2005	Carcavelos, Portugal	Decision (Unanimous)	3	3:00
2005-09-24	Loss	(Czech Republic) Petr Polak	SuperLeague Turkey 2005, Reserve Fight	Istanbul, Turkey	Decision	3	3:00
2004-12-18	Loss	(Spain) Abraham Roqueñi	K-1 MAX Spain 2004, Final	Guadalajara, Spain	Decision	3	3:00
Fight was for K-1 Spain MAX 2004 tournament -70 kg.
2004-12-18	Win	(Spain) Ruben Diaz	K-1 MAX Spain 2004, Semi-final	Guadalajara, Spain	TKO		
2004-12-18	Win	(Sweden) Joakim Karlsson	K-1 MAX Spain 2004, Quarter-final	Guadalajara, Spain	TKO (Corner Stop)		
2004-04-02	Loss	(Portugal) José Reis	K-1 MAX Portugal 2004, Semi-final	Lisbon, Portugal	TKO	2	
Called up as an injury replacement for semi final.
Legend: Win Loss Draw/No contest Notes

== See also ==
- List of K-1 events
- List of It's Showtime events
- List of K-1 champions
- List of It's Showtime champions
- List of male kickboxers
