= Mohamed Khamal =

Dutch martial artist (born 1990)

- Born: Mohamed Khamal; July 15, 1990 (age 36)
- Other names: Real fighter
- Nationality: Dutch Moroccan
- Height: 1.72 m (5 ft 7 1/2 in)
- Weight: 70 kg (154 lb; 11 st 0 lb)
- Division: Lightweight; Welterweight
- Style: Muay Thai
- Fighting out of: Amsterdam, Netherlands
- Team: Vos Gym
- Trainer: Anouar

Kickboxing record
- Total: 61
- Wins: 49
- By knockout: 18
- Losses: 9
- Draws: 3

Mohamed Khamal (born July 15, 1990) is a Moroccan former Muay Thai and kickboxer who competed in the lightweight and welterweight division. During his career, he fought in major kickboxing organizations such as K-1 MAX and It's Showtime, and won the K-1 World MAX 2010 West Europe tournament.

== Biography and career ==
Khamal was born in 1990 in the Netherlands. After a number of Muay Thai fights in the Netherlands, and after picking up good wins against opposition such as Sergio Wielzen and Hassan Ait Bassou, Khamal made his mark on the international scene in 2009 when he faced Thai legend Anuwat Kaewsamrit for the W.M.C. Intercontinental title (64 kg). The fight went the full five rounds, resulted in a unanimous decision victory for the 19-year-old fighter. With this upset victory Khamal would make his name and he would begin to be known as one of the best prospects in the 63 kg division.

In 2010 Khamal moved up in weight to 70 kg and entered the K-1 World MAX 2010 West Europe Tournament in Utrecht, Netherlands in a bid to gain qualification for the 2010 K-1 World MAX. Despite moving up in weight and being one of the events smaller fighters, Khamal made the final where he faced pre-tournament favourite Armenian-Belgium fighter Harut Grigorian. In the final match Khamal dominated, dropping Harut twice before getting the victory via brutal KO in the second round and booking his place at the K-1 World MAX 2010 Final 16.

At the final 16 event Khamal was drawn against Artur Kyshenko - the K-1 World MAX 2008 runner up. A heavy underdog going into the fight, Khamal outworked Kyshenko to take a unanimous decision victory and a place in the final 8 stage where he lost by decision to Gago Drago in the quarter-finals. At the end of 2010 Khamal fought close friend Mosab Amrani at the Fightclub presents: It's Showtime 2010 event, winning an extra round decision in what was a contender for the fight of the year.

On the 27th of May, 2012 Khamal fought Saiyok Pumpanmuang on Full Muay Thai rules. The event was held as part of the Netherlands vs Thailand show, hosted by Slamm!! Events. After a first round that saw both fighters feeling each other out, Khamal hit Saiyok with an elbow in the beginning of the second round. The elbow opened a big cut over the right eye of the Thai fighter, forcing the doctor to stop the fight. After the fight Khamal announced his retirement from the sport.

He then came out of retirement shortly later and was set to face Marat Grigorian at Glory 2: Brussels in Brussels, Belgium on October 6, 2012. However, he pulled out of this bout citing personal issues and was replaced by Alex Vogel.

Mohamed Khamal made his comeback against Sitthichai Sitsongpeenong (70 kg) at LEGEND 3 on 5 April 2014 in Milan., losing a UD.

== Titles ==
- 2014 Real Fighters World Full Muay Thai Rules -70 kg Champion (1 title def.)
- 2010 K-1 World MAX West Europe Champion
- 2009 W.M.C. Muay thai Intercontinental Champion -64 kg
- 2007 M.O.N. Netherlands Amateur Muay thai (-64 kg) champion

== Kickboxing record ==
Kickboxing record
48 wins (10 (T)KOs, 35 decisions), 10 losses, 3 draws
Date	Result	Opponent	Event	Location	Method	Round	Time
2018-06-23	Loss	(Turkey) Tayfun Özcan	Enfusion 69	Netherlands	TKO (four knockdowns/right hooks)	3	1:40
2017-12-08	Loss	(Netherlands) Endy Semeleer	Enfusion Live 58 - 72kg 8 Man Tournament, Semi-finals	Abu Dhabi, United Arab Emirates	Decision	3	3:00
2017-12-08	Win	(Morocco) Aziz Kallah	Enfusion Live 58 - 72kg 8 Man Tournament, Quarter-finals	Abu Dhabi, United Arab Emirates	Decision (unanimous)	3	3:00
2017-09-30	Loss	(Thailand) Superbon Banchamek	Enfusion Live 53	Antwerp, Belgium	Decision (unanimous)	3	3:00
2017-03-18	Win	(Thailand) Jomthong Chuwattana	Enfusion Live 47	Nijmegen, Netherlands	Decision (unanimous)	3	3:00
2016-04-03	Loss	(Netherlands) Andy Souwer	World Fighting League	Hoofddorp, Netherlands	Decision (unanimous)	3	3:00
2015-12-06	Win	(Turkey) Erkan Varol	Real Fighters a night 2 remember	Hilversum, Netherlands	Decision	5	3:00
Defends Real Fighters World Full Muay Thai Rules -70 kg Championship.
2015-10-18	Win	(Morocco) Chahid Oulad El Hadj	World Fighting League "Unfinished Business"	Hoofddorp, Netherlands	KO	2	
2014-11-30	Win	(Thailand) Kongfah Sitmonchai	Real Fighters a night 2 remember	Hilversum, Netherlands	Decision (unanimous)	5	3:00
Wins Real Fighters World Full Muay Thai Rules -70 kg Championship.
2014-04-05	Loss	(Thailand) Sitthichai Sitsongpeenong	Legend 3: Pour Homme	Milan, Italy	Decision (unanimous)	3	3:00
2012-05-27	Win	(Thailand) Saiyok Pumpanmuang	SLAMM: Nederland vs. Thailand VII	Almere, Netherlands	TKO (corner stop/cut by elbow)	2	
2011-11-06	Win	(England) Michael Dicks	Muay Thai Premier League: Round 3	THe Hague, Netherlands	Decision (unanimous)	5	3:00
2011-10-08	Win	(England) Liam Harrison	Muaythai Premier League: Round 2	Padua, Italy	Decision (split)	5	3:00
2011-05-21	Win	(Netherlands) Robin van Roosmalen	Fightclub presents: It's Showtime 2011	Amsterdam, Netherlands	Decision (split)	3	3:00
2010-12-18	Win	(Morocco) Mosab Amrani	Fightclub presents: It's Showtime 2010	Amsterdam, Netherlands	Ext.R decision (4–1)	4	3:00
2010-11-08	Loss	(Netherlands) Gago Drago	K-1 World MAX 2010 Final, Quarter-finals	Tokyo, Japan	Decision (unanimous)	3	3:00
2010-10-03	Win	(Ukraine) Artur Kyshenko	K-1 World MAX 2010 Final 16 - Part 2	Seoul, South Korea	Decision (unanimous)	3	3:00
Qualifies for K-1 World MAX 2010 Final.
2010-07-24	Loss	(Italy) Gianpiero Sportelli	Monopoli sul ring 2010	Monopoli, Italy	Decision (5–0)	3	3:00
2010-05-29	Loss	(Morocco) Chahid Oulad El Hadj	It's Showtime 2010 Amsterdam	Amsterdam, Netherlands	Decision (5–0)	3	3:00
2010-03-21	Win	(Armenia) Harut Grigorian	K-1 World MAX 2010 West Europe Tournament, Final	Utrecht, Netherlands	KO (punch)	2	
Wins K-1 World MAX 2010 West Europe Tournament and qualifies for K-1 World MAX 2010 Final 16.
2010-03-21	Win	(Netherlands) Robin van Roosmalen	K-1 World MAX 2010 West Europe Tournament, Semi-finals	Utrecht, Netherlands	KO	1	3:00
2010-03-21	Win	(Netherlands) Chris van Venrooij	K-1 World MAX 2010 West Europe Tournament, Quarter-finals	Utrecht, Netherlands	Decision (unanimous)	3	3:00
2009-11-29	Win	(Thailand) Anuwat Kaewsamrit	SLAMM "Nederland vs Thailand VI"	Almere, Netherlands	Decision (unanimous)	5	3:00
Wins W.M.C. Muaythai Intercontinental title -64 kg.
2009-07-25	Win	(Spain) Eduardo Afonso	The Night of Stars	Tetouan, Morocco	Decision (unanimous)	3	3:00
2009-05-31	Win	(Morocco) Mo Charkaoui	Next Generation Warriors III	Utrecht, Netherlands	KO	1	
2009-04-11	Win	(Morocco) Hassan Ait Bassou	Amsterdam Fightclub	Amsterdam, Netherlands	Decision (unanimous)	3	3:00
2008-11-08	Win	(Suriname) Sergio Wielzen	Ice Cold Assassins	Amsterdam, Netherlands	TKO	4	
2008-10-04	Win	(Armenia) Atty Gol	Muay Thai gala	Didam, Netherlands	Disqualification		
2008-09-28	Win	(Netherlands) Delon Carrilho	WPKL Gala Rotterdam	Rotterdam, Netherlands	Decision (unanimous)	5	3:00
2008-04-19	Win	(Morocco) Brahim Kamel	Muay Thai Gala, Sporthal Zilvermeeuwen	Zaandam, Netherlands	Decision (unanimous)	3	3:00
2008-02-24	Draw	(Netherlands) Jan Pruimboom	Muay Thai gala Veghel	Veghel, Netherlands	Decision draw	5	2:00
2007-11-03	Loss	(Netherlands) Sergio Wielzen	Beatdown V, @ Zonnehuis	Amsterdam, Netherlands	Decision (unanimous)	5	2:00
2007-09-22	Loss	(Morocco) Mo Aljedyan	Osdorp Fight Night 2007	Osdorp, Netherlands	Decision	5	2:00
2007-09-01	Win	(Netherlands) Romano Morjoner	Kumiteé Everybody Gym	Hilversum, Netherlands	Decision (unanimous)	5	2:00
2007-06-30	Draw	(Belgium) Suleyman Kasmi	NSK Holland vs Belgium	Delft, Netherlands	Decision draw	5	2:00
2007-05-27	Win	(Netherlands) Reinout Sterk	M.O.N. Netherlands Amateur Championships "Fighting to Thailand"	Drachten, Netherlands	Decision	5	2:00
Wins M.O.N. Netherlands Amateur Muaythai (-64 kg) title.
2007-05-19	Win	(Morocco) Mohamed Lahmaj	Muaythai Gala "Fighting Nordin Memorial III"	Purmerend, Netherlands	KO	3	
2007-05-12	Win	(Morocco) Fouad Zeknikni	Fighting with the Stars	Hilversum, Netherlands	KO (knee strike)	2	
2007-04-14	Win	(Morocco) Aziz el Mamouni	Shima events, Sporthal Zilvermeeuwen	Zaandam, Netherlands	Decision (unanimous)	5	2:00
2007-04-01	Win	(Morocco) Redouan Moutqane	Homeboys I	Oostzaan, Netherlands	Decision (unanimous)	3	2:00
2007-03-03	Win	(Morocco) Nabil Kamrani	Fight Night Amsterdam, Zonnehuis	Amsterdam, Netherlands	Decision (unanimous)	3	2:00
2007-02-10	Win	(Morocco) Abdel Salam	Beatdown IV	Amsterdam, Netherlands	Decision (unanimous)	3	2:00
2006-12-16	Win	(Morocco) Abdel Salam	Fight4Life gala	Netherlands	Decision (unanimous)	3	2:00
2006-11-26	Win	(Morocco) Hoessein Hayoutti	Victory or Hell, Sportcentrum Van Hogendorp	Amsterdam, Netherlands	Decision (unanimous)	2	2:00
2006-10-07	Draw	(Brazil) Isaias Ferreira	Muaythai All Style Gala Martial Arts part II	Leek, Netherlands	Decision draw	2	2:00
2006-06-18	Win	(Belgium) Azedinne Bouzammour	Kickbox gala Antwerpen	Antwerp, Belgium	Decision (unanimous)	2	2:00
2006-05-20	Win	(Morocco) Abdel Stitou	Muaythai Gala "Talent Scout"	Purmerend, Netherlands	Decision (unanimous)	2	1:30
2006-03-04	Win	(Turkey) Doguhan Sonbahar	Muaythai Jeugd Gala - Youth Force Zone III	Amsterdam, Netherlands	Decision (unanimous)	2	1:30
Legend: Win Loss Draw/no contest Notes

== See also ==
- List of K-1 events
- List of male kickboxers
