= Stjepan Veselic =

- Born: 24 October 1974 (age 51); Rotterdam, Netherlands
- Other names: Terrifying
- Weight: 72 kg (159 lb; 11.3 st)
- Style: Muay Thai
- Fighting out of: Rotterdam, Netherlands
- Team: Pattaya Gym
- Trainer: Ruud de Ronde
- Years active: 1992-2005

Kickboxing record
- Total: 52
- Wins: 38
- By knockout: 31
- Losses: 14
- By knockout: 10
- Last updated on: July 13, 2012

Stjepan Veselic (born October 24, 1974, in Rotterdam, Netherlands) is a retired Dutch middleweight Muay Thai kickboxer. He is a former World and European champion in Muay Thai. Veselic had a tendency to go head-to-head with his opponents, which made him a favorite with fight fans.

== Biography and career ==
Born of mixed Croatian-Dutch descent, Veselic started kickboxing at the age of 16. He fought out of Rotterdam for Pattaya Gym. His trainer was Ruud de Ronde alongside Herman Van Den Berge, Peter Mul, Ronald Wismeyer and Elroy Hage. Veselic is passionate fan of football club Feyenoord and during his career he fought in the Feyenoord colours and with the initials of Sporting Club Feyenoord 1908 on his short. He retired as a former WPKL Muay Thai Dutch, European and World Champion.

== Titles ==
- 2000 World Professional Kickboxing League (WPKL) Muay Thai World Middleweight Champion (3 title defenses)
- 2000 WPKL Muay Thai European Middleweight Champion
- 2000 WPKL Muay Thai Dutch Middleweight Champion
- 1998 WPKL Muay Thai Dutch Super Welterweight Champion (1 title defense)
- 1996 NKBB Kickboxing Dutch Super Welterweight Champion

== Kickboxing record ==
Kickboxing Record
38 Wins (31 KOs, 7 Decisions), 14 Losses
Date	Result	Opponent	Event	Location	Method	Round	Time	Record
2005-10-05	Win	(Japan) Chiba	The Last Performance	Rotterdam, Netherlands	KO	1		38-14
2005-04-03	Win	(Thailand) Mot Eck Muangsemaa	A Tribute to Leo de Snoo	Rotterdam, Netherlands	TKO			37-14
2004-05-20	Loss	(Armenia) Gago Drago	It's Showtime 2004 Amsterdam	Netherlands	Decision (Unanimous)	5	3:00	36-14
2004-03-21	Loss	(Thailand) Pajonsuk	Veselic vs. Lumpini's No. 1	Rotterdam, Netherlands	KO (Elbows)	3		36-13
Loses WPKL Muay Thai World Middleweight Championship.
2003-10-05	Win	(Belgium) Laurant Piriqet	Night of Explosions	Rotterdam, Netherlands	KO			36-12
2003-04-06	Loss	(Armenia) Gago Drago	K-1 World Grand Prix 2003 Preliminary Holland	Netherlands	KO (Right Knee Strike)	3	2:40	35-12
2003-02-16	Win	(Thailand) Sakmongkol Sithchuchok		Rotterdam, Netherlands	TKO (Corner Stoppage)	2		35-11
Defends WPKL Muay Thai World Middleweight Championship.
2002-10-13	Win	(Netherlands) Vincent Vielvoye	2H2H 5: Simply the Best	Rotterdam, Netherlands	KO	4		34-11
Defends WPKL Muay Thai World Middleweight Championship.
2002-09-08	Win	(France) Eddy Saban		Rotterdam, Netherlands	KO			33-11
2002-04-21	Loss	(Morocco) Najim Ettouhlali	Victory or Hell	Amsterdam, Netherlands	KO			32-11
2002-02-03	Loss	(Netherlands) Rayen Simson		Rotterdam, Netherlands	Decision (Unanimous)	5	3:00	32-10
2001-04-29	Win	(Belarus) Sergei Karpin		Rotterdam, Netherlands	TKO (Doctor Stoppage)	1		32-9
Defends WPKL Muay Thai World Middleweight Championship.
2001-03-03	Loss	(Thailand) Jomhod Kiatadisak	The Night of Explosion	Rotterdam, Netherlands	Decision	5	3:00	31-9
2000-12-12	Loss	(Belarus) Sergei Karpin	It's Showtime	Haarlem, Netherlands	KO	1		31-8
2000-11-12	Win	(Switzerland) Andreas Marchetti	The Night of Explosion	Rotterdam, Netherlands	KO	3		31-7
2000-09-03	Win	(Thailand) Dejpitak Sityodtong	Veselic meets Dejpitak	Rotterdam, Netherlands	KO			30-7
Wins WPKL Muay Thai World Middleweight Championship.
2000-06-04	Win	(Netherlands) Andy Souwer	Night of Revenge	Amsterdam, Netherlands	KO	1		29-7
2000-04-16	Win	(Morocco) Hassan Ettaki	Thrill of the Year	Rotterdam, Netherlands	KO	1		28-7
Wins WPKL Muay Thai European Middleweight Championship.
2000-01-23	Win	(Netherlands) Vincent Vielvoye	Day of No Mercy	Rotterdam, Netherlands	KO	3		27-7
Wins WPKL Muay Thai Dutch Middleweight Championship.
1999-12-05	Loss	(Thailand) Yodsuriyan Sith Yodthong	King's Birthday 1999	Bangkok, Thailand	KO	1		26-7
1999-10-30	Win	(Netherlands) Gerold Mamadeus	Night of Sensation	Rotterdam, Netherlands	KO	2		26-6
1999-09-25	Win	(Netherlands) Rachid Biner		Vlaardingen, Netherlands	KO			25-6
1999-02-07	Win	(Morocco) Abdel Terzati	Matter of Honour	Rotterdam, Netherlands	Decision (Unanimous)	5	3:00	24-6
Defends WPKL Muay Thai Dutch Super Welterweight Championship.
1998-12-03	Win	(Morocco) Abdel Terzati	Night of Superstars	Amsterdam, Netherlands	DQ (Illegal Blow)			23-6
Wins WPKL Muay Thai Dutch Super Welterweight Championship.
1998-11-28	Win	(Morocco) El Azzouz		Rotterdam, Netherlands	KO			22-6
1998-05-23	Loss	(Suriname) Rayen Simson	Muay Thai Champions League	Roosendaal, Netherlands	KO	1		21-6
1998-05-23	Win	(Thailand) Mangonjuk	Muay Thai Champions League	Roosendaal, Netherlands	KO	3		21-5
1997-12-13	Win	(Turkey) Yucel Fidan		Den Bosch, Netherlands	Decision (Unanimous)	5	3:00	20-5
1997-11-02	Win	(Belgium) Dave Delville		Rotterdam, Netherlands	KO			19-5
1997-06-01	Win	(Netherlands) Arnold Sas	Battle of Amsterdam	Amsterdam, Netherlands	Decision (Unanimous)	5	3:00	18-5
1997-04-?	Loss	(Morocco) Najim Ettouhlali		Amsterdam, Netherlands	KO			17-5
1997-02-01	Loss	(Morocco) Hassan Ettaki		Rabat, Morocco	KO			17-4
1996-09-10	Loss	(Belarus) Dmitriy Pyasetsky		Prague, Czech Republic	KO			17-3
Fight was for ISKA Kickboxing Super Welterweight Championship.
1996-05-18	Win	(Netherlands) Marvin Irion		Emmen, Netherlands	KO	2		17-2
1996-02-04	Win	(Netherlands) Robbie Nelson		Dordrecht, Netherlands	TKO	2		16-2
Wins NKBB Kickboxing Dutch Super Welterweight Championship.
1995-11-14	Win	(Netherlands) Rogier van der Heijden	Zilvermeeuwen	Zaandam, Netherlands	Decision (Unanimous)	5	3:00	15-2
1995-06-18	Win	(Morocco) Nadir LaReche		Breda, Netherlands	TKO	1		14-2
1995-05-08	Win	(Netherlands) Aad Aldus		Rotterdam, Netherlands	KO	2		13-2
1995-02-06	Win	(Netherlands) Jimmy Hoover		Rotterdam, Netherlands	Decision (Unanimous)	5	2:00	12-2
1994-12-18	Win	(Netherlands) Kaci		Amsterdam, Netherlands	TKO			11-2
1994-10-10	Win	(Netherlands) Santjoe		Rotterdam, Netherlands	KO	1		10-2
1994-06-27	Win	(Turkey) Mehmet Coban		Rotterdam, Netherlands	KO	1		9-2
1994-05-16	Win	(Netherlands) Damink		Rotterdam, Netherlands	KO	1	0:01	8-2
1994-04-18	Win	(Germany) Franssachio		Germany	KO	3		7-2
1994-03-05	Win	(Netherlands) Don Kempers		Breda, Netherlands	TKO (Referee Stoppage)	3		6-2
1993-11-27	Win	(Netherlands) Bernard Veenstra		Marum, Netherlands	KO	1		5-2
1993-05-16	Loss	(Morocco) El Ejjouri		Sliedrecht, Netherlands	TKO (Corner Stoppage)			4-2
1996-09-10	Loss	(Netherlands) Renato Haseth		Groningen, Netherlands	Decision (Unanimous)			4-1
1993-01-23	Win	(Netherlands) van de Berg		Amsterdam, Netherlands	KO	1	0:15	4-0
1992-12-14	Win	(Netherlands) Wokke		Rotterdam, Netherlands	Decision (Unanimous)			3-0
1992-06-14	Win	(Netherlands) Kemmeren		Breda, Netherlands	Decision (Unanimous)			2-0
1992-04-10	Win	(Turkey) Ozden		Germany	KO	1	0:25	1-0
Legend: Win Loss Draw/No contest Notes

== See also ==
- List of K-1 events
- List of male kickboxers
