= Harut Grigorian =

Armenian-Belgian kickboxer

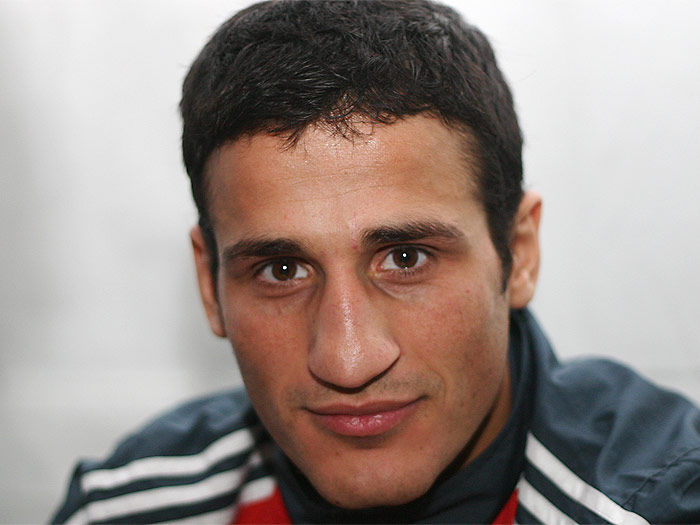
- Born: 24 March 1989 (age 37); Yerevan, Armenian SSR, Soviet Union
- Nationality: Armenian; Belgian
- Height: 1.81 m (5 ft 11 1/2 in)
- Weight: 77 kg (170 lb; 12 st 2 lb)
- Division: Welterweight; Middleweight
- Style: Kickboxing, Muay Thai
- Stance: Orthodox
- Fighting out of: Antwerp, Belgium
- Team: Hemmers Gym
- Trainer: Nick Hemmers
- Years active: 2007–present

Professional boxing record
- Total: 2
- Wins: 1
- Losses: 0
- Draws: 1

Kickboxing record
- Total: 69
- Wins: 54
- By knockout: 34
- Losses: 15
- By knockout: 4
- Draws: 0
- Last updated on: 12 December 2025

Harut Grigorian (Armenian: Հարութ Գրիգորյան; born 24 March 1989) is an Armenian-Belgian kickboxer and former Glory Welterweight Champion. He has also competed in the It's Showtime, K-1 and Colosseum Tournament promotions.

He was ranked in the Combat Press welterweight top ten between September 2017 and July 2021 peaking at #2. He reentered the rankings at No. 9 in March 2022.

== Early life ==
Harut Grigorian was born on 24 March 1989 to Armenian Parents in Yerevan, then part of the Armenian Soviet Socialist Republic, before his family relocated to Belgium, where he trained for many years at the Bulldog Gym under coach Danielle Somers, an eight-time world champion. He later moved to the Netherlands to train at Hemmers Gym, Somers’ original gym.

== Career ==
=== Early career ===
Grigorian rose to prominence as a young fighter with an extensive record in his adopted country of Belgium. In perhaps the most notable bout of his early career, he featured as a reserve fighter at the S-Cup Europe 2008 in Gorinchem, Netherlands on 20 September 2008, where he defeated Abdallah Mabel by decision.

On 21 February 2009, he defeated Pedro Sedarous via decision after five rounds to claim the Benelux Muay Thai -70 kg Championship. He debuted in the It's Showtime organization later that year when he defeated Chris Ngimbi by an extra round decision at It's Showtime 2009 Lommel on September 24. He followed this up with a technical knockout win over Seo Doo Won at It's Showtime 2009 Barneveld on 21 November 2009.

=== 2010 ===
Grigorian competed in the eight-man grand prix at the K-1 World MAX 2010 West Europe Tournament held in Utrecht, Netherlands on 21 March 2010. He defeated Bruno Carvalho and Anthony Kane by decision in the quarter-finals and semi-finals, respectively, before losing via a second-round KO to Mohamed Khamal in the final. Following this, he went 2-0 throughout the rest of the year, with decision wins over Henri van Opstal and Alessandro Campagna.

=== 2011 ===
He began 2011 with a decision win over Henri van Opstal on 12 February 2011. Following a disqualification loss to Gino Bourne on 19 March 2011, he rebounded with a first-round KO of Lahcen Ait Oussakour on 9 April 2011, before being invited to take part in the eight-man grand prix at BFN Group & Music Hall presents: It's Showtime "Fast & Furious 70MAX", which was held in Brussels, Belgium on 24 September 2011. At the quarter-finals stage, he was drawn against veteran Dutch fighter Andy Souwer and was able to take him to an extra round, after which he lost a close split decision.

=== 2012 ===
He was scheduled to face Chahid Oulad El Hadj at It's Showtime 2012 in Leeuwarden on 28 January 2012, but El Hadj pulled out due to an injury and Grigorian was instead set up with a rematch against It's Showtime 70MAX Champion Chris Ngimbi in a non-title fight. He put in a spectacular performance against the Congolese Muay Thai fighter, picking him apart before forcing the referee to stop the fight due to a cut in round two.

On 21 September 2012, Grigorian won his first bout as a professional boxer when he took a unanimous decision over Hovhannes Kishmiryan in Antwerp.

=== 2013 ===
Next up for Grigorian was a match with Juanma Chacon at Enfusion Live: Barcelona in Barcelona, Spain on 9 March 2012.

=== 2014 ===
On 20 September 2014, Grigorian competed in the eight-man grand prix at the A1 World Combat Cup held in Eindhoven, Netherlands. He defeated Nicky Lopez and Tayfun Ozcan by decision in the quarter-finals and semi-finals, respectively, and defeated Nordin Ben Moh by a first-round knockout in the finals to win the tournament championship.

=== 2017 ===
After amassing a 3–1 record in Glory, Grigorian suffered a controversial knockout blow from Murthel Groenhart in their rematch at Glory 42 Paris. He inexplicably turned his head away from Groenhart after getting kneed on the face which seemed to have left him a little dazed, confused, and shocked. With his back turned to Groenhart, Groenhart took the opportunity to end the fight by delivering the knockout punch to Grigorian from behind, shocking the crowd and drawing anger from three fans who invaded the ring and punched Groenhart, hurting the fighter. There was chaos in the ring until trainers from both sides as well as officials broke up the brawl with Grigorian still lying dazed with a deep cut over his eye. Groenhart and Grigorian later seemingly made up. This led to speculation that a third grudge match between the two rivals is very possible.

At Glory 44: Chicago, Grigorian competed in the Glory Welterweight Contender Tournament, defeating both Karim Benmansour in the semi-finals and Antoine Pinto in the finals, and earned a shot at the welterweight title.

=== 2018 ===
Grigorian faced Murthel Groenhart for a third time at Glory 50: Chicago for the Glory Welterweight Championship. In the first round, Harut dropped Groenhart with punches and the referee stopped the fight soon after, making him the Glory Welterweight Champion.

Grigorian defended the title against Alim Nabiev in Glory 54: Birmingham. Grigorian won by unanimous decision.

=== 2019 ===
In 2019 he lost the title to Doumbé who won the fight by TKO, after knocking Grigorian down three times in the second round.

=== 2020 ===
In 2020 he fought against Jamie Bates and lost a decision in Glory 75: Utrecht.

=== 2022-2026 ===
Grigorian would go 6–2 in his last 8 after his Glory departure.

== Personal life ==
Harut and his teammate Marat Grigorian are often mistaken to be brothers, however both have confirmed that they are good friends but not related.

In 2021, he opened a kickboxing school in Deurne.

== Titles and accomplishments ==
- Glory
  - 2018 Glory Welterweight Champion
    - 1 successful Defense
  - 2017 Glory Welterweight Contender Tournament winner
- A-1 World Combat
  - 2014 A1 World Combat Cup Tournament Champion
- K-1
  - 2010 K-1 World MAX West Europe runner up
- Benelux Muay Thai -70 kg Champion
- Multi Fight Club
  - 2022 MFC Welterweight (-77 kg) Champion
- Golden Fighting Championship
  - 2023 GFC Welterweight (-77 kg) Champion
  - 2024 GFC Welterweight (-77 kg) Champion
  - 2025 GFC Welterweight (-77 kg) Champion
- Colosseum Tournament
  - Colosseum Tournament World Welterweight Championship (one time)

== Kickboxing record ==
Kickboxing record
54 wins (34 KOs), 15 losses
Date	Result	Opponent	Event	Location	Method	Round	Time
2026-10-03		(Belgium) Julien Schenkels	WFL ~War for the Crown~ Final 16	Antwerp, Belgium			
2026-05-23	Win	(Ivory Coast) Johan Koffi	FBL Mayhem 3	Leuven, Belgium	Decision (unanimous)	3	3:00
2025-12-12	Loss	(Romania) Alex Panțîru	Colosseum Tournament 48	Ploiești, Romania	KO (flurry of punches)	1	1:44
Lost the Colosseum Tournament World Welterweight title.
2025-04-04	Win	(Romania) Alex Amariței	Colosseum Tournament 45	London, England	Decision (unanimous)	5	3:00
Wins the vacant Colosseum Tournament World Welterweight title.
2024-10-27	Win	(Germany) Dani Traoré	GFC III	Antwerp, Belgium	KO	3	3:00
2024-02-16	Loss	(Australia) James Honey	AFS: Australia vs The World	Dubai, UAE	Decision (split)	3	3:00
2023-12-16	Win	(France) Matthieu Ceva	Golden Fighting Championship 2	Antwerp, Belgium	KO	1	1:00
2023-01-23	Win	(Italy) Andrea Festa	Golden Fighting Championship	Antwerp, Belgium	Decision (unanimous)	3	3:00
2022-03-05	Win	(Romania) Anghel Cardoş	Multi Fight Championship 1	Yerevan, Armenia	Decision (unanimous)	3	3:00
Wins the inaugural MFC Welterweight title.
2020-02-29	Loss	(England) Jamie Bates	Glory 75: Utrecht	Utrecht, Netherlands	Decision (unanimous)	3	3:00
2019-03-09	Loss	(France) Cédric Doumbé	Glory 64: Strasbourg	Strasbourg, France	TKO (3 knockdowns)	2	2:59
Loses the Glory Welterweight Championship.
2018-06-02	Win	(Azerbaijan) Alim Nabiev	Glory 54: Birmingham	Birmingham, England	Decision (unanimous)	5	3:00
Retains the Glory Welterweight Championship.
2018-02-17	Win	(Netherlands) Murthel Groenhart	Glory 50: Chicago	Chicago, United States	TKO (referee stoppage)	1	2:07
Wins the Glory Welterweight Championship.
2017-08-25	Win	(France) Antoine Pinto	Glory 44: Chicago - Welterweight Contender Tournament, Final	Chicago, United States	Decision (unanimous)	3	3:00
Wins the Glory Welterweight Contender Tournament.
2017-08-25	Win	(France) Karim Benmansour	Glory 44: Chicago - Welterweight Contender Tournament, Semi Finals	United States	Decision (unanimous)	3	3:00
2017-06-10	Loss	(Netherlands) Murthel Groenhart	Glory 42: Paris	Paris, France	KO (punch)	2	
2017-03-25	Win	(Slovakia) Pavol Garaj	Glory 39: Brussels	Brussels, Belgium	Decision	3	3:00
2016-12-10	Win	(Germany) Danijel Solaja	Glory 36: Oberhausen	Oberhausen, Germany	TKO (punches)	1	1:01
2016-06-25	Loss	(Switzerland) Yoann Kongolo	Glory 31: Amsterdam - Welterweight Contender Tournament, Semi Finals	Amsterdam, Netherlands	Decision (split)	3	3:00
2016-04-16	Win	(Spain) Maximo Suarez	Glory 29: Copenhagen	Copenhagen, Denmark	TKO	1	2:55
2016-03-12	Win	(France) Mathieu Tavares	Top Action	Belgium	TKO	2	
2015-11-28	Win	(Iran) Vahid Roshani	A1 World Combat Cup 20	Eindhoven, Netherlands	TKO	3	
2015-10-10	Win	(Morocco) Hafid El Boustati	Enfusion Live 32	Ghent, Belgium	TKO	2	
2015-05-23	Win	(Greece) Alexis Iordanidis	VFC 2 °Coskun promotions°	Antwerp, Belgium	TKO	2	1:30
2015-03-14	Win	(Suriname) Marco Piqué	Enfusion Live 25	Turnhout, Belgium	Decision	3	3:00
2014-12-11	Win	(France) Édouard Bernadou	Victory	Levallois-Perret, France	Decision	3	3:00
2014-11-22	Win	(Turkey) Yakup Kaya	Fight Night Bree	Bree, Belgium	Decision	3	3:00
2014-09-20	Win	(Morocco) Nordin Ben Moh	A1 World Combat Cup - Final 8, Final	Eindhoven, Netherlands	KO	1	2:00
Wins A1 World Combat Cup 2014 Tournament Championship.
2014-09-20	Win	(Turkey) Tayfun Ozcan	A1 World Combat Cup - Final 8, Semi Finals	Eindhoven, Netherlands	Decision	3	3:00
2014-09-20	Win	(Netherlands) Nicky Lopez	A1 World Combat Cup - Final 8, Quarter Finals	Eindhoven, Netherlands	Decision	3	3:00
2014-03-15	Win	(Netherlands) Monteira Da Velga	Fight Night	Turnhou, Belgium	Decision	3	3:00
2013-12-14	Loss	(Mali) Mohamed Diaby	Victory, Semi Finals	Paris, France	Decision	3	3:00
2013-06-01	Win	(Netherlands) Antone Mandela		Beringen, Belgium	Decision	3	3:00
2013-01-26	Win	(Thailand) Detchpew Voravutch		Lommel, Belgium	TKO	2	
2012-05-27	Loss	(Netherlands) Murthel Groenhart	K-1 World MAX 2012 World Championship Tournament Final 16	Madrid, Spain	KO (punches)	3	3:00
2012-02-11	Win	(Italy) Francesco Tadiello	Sporthal De Zandbergen	Sint-Job-in-'t-Goor, Belgium	KO	1	
2012-01-28	Win	(Democratic Republic of the Congo) Chris Ngimbi	It's Showtime 2012 in Leeuwarden	Leeuwarden, Netherlands	TKO (cut)	2	1:22
2011-09-24	Loss	(Netherlands) Andy Souwer	BFN Group & Music Hall presents: It's Showtime "Fast & Furious 70MAX", Quarter Finals	Brussels, Belgium	Extra round decision (split)	4	3:00
2011-04-09	Win	(Belgium) Lahcen Ait Oussakour	Le Grande KO XI	Liège, Belgium	KO	1	
2011-03-19	Loss	(Belgium) Gino Bourne	Fight Night Turnhout	Turnhout, Belgium	DQ		
2011-02-12	Win	(Netherlands) Henri van Opstal	War of the Ring	Amsterdam, Netherlands	Decision (unanimous)	3	3:00
2010-12-04	Win	(Italy) Alessandro Campagna	Janus Fight Night 2010	Padua, Italy	Decision	3	3:00
2010-11-01	Win	(Belgium) Ali Abrayem	Who's The Best 2	Charleroi, Belgium	Decision	3	3:00
2010-03-21	Loss	(Morocco) Mohamed Khamal	K-1 World MAX 2010 West Europe Tournament, Final	Utrecht, Netherlands	KO (punch)	2	
Fight was for K-1 World MAX 2010 West Europe Tournament Championship title.
2010-03-21	Win	(Republic of Ireland) Anthony Kane	K-1 World MAX 2010 West Europe Tournament, Semi Finals	Utrecht, Netherlands	Decision	3	3:00
2010-03-21	Win	(Portugal) Bruno Carvalho	K-1 World MAX 2010 West Europe Tournament, Quarter Finals	Utrecht, Netherlands	Decision	3	3:00
2010-01-09	Win	(Cape Verde) Edson Fortes	RSC Uprising 12	Utrecht, Netherlands	Decision	3	3:00
2009-11-21	Win	(South Korea) Seo Doo Won	It's Showtime 2009 Barneveld	Barneveld, Netherlands	TKO (referee stoppage)	1	
2009-09-24	Win	(Democratic Republic of the Congo) Chris Ngimbi	It's Showtime 2009 Lommel	Lommel, Belgium	Extra round decision	4	4:00
2009-04-11	Win	(Netherlands) Farid Riffi	Almelo Fight for Delight	Almelo, Netherlands	TKO		
2009-03-14	Win	(Russia) Viktor Sarezki	War of the Ring	Belgium	KO (punch to the body)	1	
2009-02-21	Win	(Netherlands) Pedro Sedarous	Turnhout Gala	Turnhout, Belgium	Decision	5	3:00
Wins Benelux Muay Thai -70kg Championship.
2009-01-31	Win	(France) Dahou Naim	Tielrode Gala	Tielrode, Belgium	2nd extra round decision	5	3:00
2008-09-20	Win	(France) Abdallah Mabel	S-Cup Europe 2008, Reserve Bout	Gorinchem, Netherlands	Decision	3	3:00
2008-09-14	Win	(Netherlands) Jordy Sloof	The Outland Rumble	Rotterdam, Netherlands	KO (right cross)	1	
2008-03-08	Win	(Turkey) Naraim Ruben	Lommel Gala	Lommel, Belgium	TKO (retirement)	3	
2008-02-23	Win	(Belgium) Pierre Petit	St. Job Gala	St. Job, Belgium	KO (Right punch)	2	
2008-01-26	Win	(Turkey) Yildiz Bullut	Tielrode Gala	Tielrode, Belgium	TKO	2	
2007-12-16	Loss	(Netherlands) Henri van Opstal	Klash 4	Netherlands	Decision (unanimous)	3	3:00
2007-11-28	Win	(Morocco) Ibrahim Benazza	Lint Gala	Lint, Belgium	Decision	5	2:00
2007-10-27	Win	(Republic of Ireland) Anthony Kane	One Night in Bangkok	Antwerp, Belgium	Decision	5	
Legend: Win Loss Draw/no contest Notes

== Boxing record ==
Boxing record
1 win (0 KOs), 0 losses, 1 draw
Date	Result	Opponent	Event	Location	Method	Round	Time	Record
2012-09-21	Win	(Armenia) Hovhannes Kishmiryan		Antwerp, Belgium	Decision (unanimous)	4	3:00	1–0–1
2011-03-04	Draw	(Belgium) Ahmed El Ghoulbzouri		Antwerp, Belgium	Majority draw	4	3:00	0–0–1
Legend: Win Loss Draw/no contest Notes
