= Jomhod Kiatadisak =

Thai former professional Muay Thai fighter and kickboxer

- Born: Chamlom Thodthing; July 5, 1970 (age 56); Takua Pa, Phang Nga, Thailand
- Native name: จำลอง ทอดทิ้ง
- Nickname: King of the Ring
- Height: 177 cm (5 ft 10 in)
- Division: Super Lightweight; Welterweight; Super Welterweight; Middleweight; Super Middleweight
- Style: Muay Thai (Muay Femur)
- Stance: Orthodox
- Team: Kiatadisak; Detrat; MuayThai Plaza; Jomhod MuayThai
- Years active: c. (1981–2013)

Kickboxing record
- Total: 303
- Wins: 276
- By knockout: 80
- Losses: 24
- No contests: 3

Chamlom Thodthing (Thai: จำลอง ทอดทิ้ง; born July 5, 1970), known professionally as Jomhod Kiatadisak (Thai: จอมโหด เกียรติอดิศักดิ์), is a Thai former professional Muay Thai fighter and kickboxer.

== Biography and career ==
He started learning muay Thai at the age of 7 and won his first fight when he was 11 years old. In 1986, Jomhod won the Southern Thailand Championship in 59.6 kg weight category and the same year, at the age of 16, he moved to Bangkok and began his proper fighting career.

Jomhod fought in Lumpinee stadium for the first time in 1989. At the age of 18 he won the Lumpinee Lightweight Title, he never lost the belt but vacated it to move up in weight. In 1994 he won the Rachadamernn Championship in the same weight class, followed by the super lightweight title the next year and at one stage simultaneously held titles in both Lumpinee Stadium and Rajadamnern Stadium.

In 1995 Jomhod moved to Finland after a request to come fight and coach there. He lived in Finland for 11 years winning numerous titles in muay Thai and kickboxing. In 2006 he moved back to Thailand to be head coach at the J. Prapa Gym in Kata Beach, Phuket but recently opened his own gym, Jomhod Muay Thai, near Phuket airport and Nai Yang beach.

In 1998 he won the Muay Thai Champion's League Final in Amsterdam beating Sakmongkol Sithchuchok by TKO (round three) in the final. He holds a notable win over Ramon Dekkers from the King's Cup in 1996 and a notable K-1 loss to Buakaw Por. Pramuk from 2006. Other Western opponents he has beaten include Ivan Hippolyte and Ole Laursen.

Jomhod has continued to fight occasionally in Phuket even though he is now in his 50s and in December 2012 he returned to Bangkok, beating former Olympic gold medal winner Somluck Kamsing by decision at Lumpinee Stadium.

== Titles and accomplishments ==
- Regional
  - 1986 South Thailand Champion -59.6 kg
- Lumpinee Stadium
  - 1989 Lumpinee Stadium Super Lightweight (140 lbs) Champion
    - One successful title defense
- Rajadamnern Stadium
  - 1992 Rajadamnern Stadium Super Lightweight (140 lbs) Champion
  - 1994 Rajadamnern Stadium Welterweight (147 lbs) Champion
- World Muaythai Council
  - 1991 WMC World Welterweight (147 lbs) Champion
  - 2000 WMC World Super Welterweight (154 lbs) Champion
  - 2004 WMC World Middleweight (160 lbs) Champion
  - 2011 WMC World Super Middleweight (168 lbs) Champion
- World Muay Thai Association
  - 1996 WMTA World Super Welterweight (154 lbs) Champion
- World Kickboxing Association
  - 1998 WKA Muay Thai World Welterweight (147 lbs) Champion
- International Kickboxing Federation
  - 1998 I.K.B.F. Kickboxing World Champion -66.7 kg
- International Sport Karate Association
- 1998 ISKA Muay Thai World Champion -66.7 kg
  - 2002 ISKA Muay Thai World Champion -69.8 kg
  - 2003 ISKA Muay Thai World Champion -69.8 kg
- World Professional Kickboxing League
  - 2000 WPKL Muay Thai World Champion -69.8 kg
  - 2002 WPKL Muay Thai World Champion -69.8 kg
- World Kickboxing Network
  - 2000 WKN Muay Thai World Champion -72.6 kg
- Muay Thai Champions League
  - 2000 Muay Thai Champions League Tournament Champion -70 kg
- World Professional Kickboxing Association
  - 2001 WPKA Muay Thai World Champion -69.8 kg

== Fight record ==
Kickboxing record
Wins, Losses, Draws
Date	Result	Opponent	Event	Location	Method	Round	Time
2013-02-07	Loss	(Thailand) Somrak Thor.Thepsuthin	Rajadamnern Stadium	Bangkok, Thailand	Decision	5	3:00
2012-12-07	Win	(Thailand) Somrak Thor.Thepsuthin	Lumpinee Champion Krikkrai Fight, Lumpinee Stadium	Bangkok, Thailand	Decision	5	3:00
2011-12-28	Win	(Brazil) Adaylton Freitas		Phuket, Thailand			
Wins the WMC World Super Middleweight (168 lbs) title.
2011-11-02	Win	(Uganda) Umar Semata	Bangla Boxing Stadium	Phuket, Thailand	Decision	5	3:00
2010-12-29	Win	(United States) Cyrus Washington	Bangla Boxing Stadium	Phuket, Thailand	Decision	5	3:00
2010-10-16	Win	(France) Hicham Chaibi	Fight Festival 28	Helsinki, Finland	Decision	5	3:00
2007-00-00	Loss	(Australia) Soren Monkongtong	Lumpinee Stadium	Bangkok, Thailand	Decision	5	3:00
2006-12-05	Loss	(Russia) Dzhabar Askerov	King's Cup 2006, Semi Finals	Bangkok, Thailand	Decision	3	3:00
2006-08-19	Loss	(United Kingdom) Steve Wakeling	Muaythai Legends - England vs Thailand	London, UK	Decision	5	3:00
2006-02-18	Loss	(Thailand) Buakaw Por. Pramuk	WMC Explosion III	Stockholm, Sweden	KO (Right Hook to the body)	2	
Loses the WMC World Middleweight (160 lbs) title.
2005-12-18	Loss	(Turkey) Şahin Yakut	It's Showtime 75MAX Trophy Prague, Pool B Final	Prague, Czech Republic	Ext.R Decision	4	3:00
Fails to qualifiy for It's Showtime 75MAX Trophy Final 2006.
2005-12-18	Win	(Czech Republic) Jindrich Velecky	It's Showtime 75MAX Trophy Prague, Pool B Semi Finals	Prague, Czech Republic			
2005-02-19	Win	(Russia) Arslan Magomedov			TKO (Cut)	2	
Defends the WMC World Middleweight (160 lbs) title.
2005-05-21	Win	(United Kingdom) Alex Dally	Rumble of the Kings 2005 K-1 World GP North European	Stockholm, Sweden	Decision	5	3:00
Defends the WMC World Middleweight (160 lbs) title.
2004-10-23	Win	(Lithuania) Darius Skliaudys	Lumpinee Gaala II (75 kg fight)	Helsinki, Finland	TKO	4	
2004-09-05	Win	(Thailand) Wanlop Sitpholek		Stockholm, Sweden	Decision	5	3:00
Wins the WMC World Middleweight (160 lbs) title.
2003-04-05	Win	(Netherlands) William Diender	Kings Of The Ring - Kickboxing Superstar XI	Milan, Italy	Decision	5	3:00
Retains the 153lbs ISKA World title.
2003-03-15	Win	(Philippines) Ole Laursen	K-1 World GP 2003 Scandinavia	Stockholm, Sweden	Decision	3	3:00
2002-11-03	Win	(Netherlands) Chris van Venrooij	Muay Thai Hoofddorp	Hoofddorp, Netherlands	Decision (Unanimous)	5	3:00
Defends the WPKL World Super Welterweight (154 lbs) title.
2002-00-00	Win	(Netherlands) Ron Post	OKTAGON K-1	Milan, Italy			
Wins the 153lbs ISKA World title.
2001-03-31	Win	(Netherlands) Jerry Morris		TKO	4		
Wins the WPKA World Super Welterweight (154 lbs) title.
2001-03-03	Win	(Netherlands) Stjepan Veselic	The Night of Explosion	Rotterdam, Netherlands	Decision	5	3:00
2000-10-23	Win	(Belgium) Laurent Periquet	Fight Festival 2	Helsinki, Finland	TKO	3	
Wins the WKN World Middleweight (160 lbs) title.
2000-05-15	Win	(Morocco) Hassan Kassrioui					
Wins the 154lbs WPKL World title.
2000-00-00	Win	(Australia) Luke Kempton					
Wins the 154lbs WMC World title.
1999-00-00	Win	(United Kingdom) Tim Izli		UK	TKO	4	
1999-02-20	Win	(Belgium) Mohammed Ouali			KO	2	
1998-11-14	Win	(Thailand) Sakmongkol Sithchuchok	Muay Thai Champions League III, Final	Amsterdam, Netherlands	TKO	3	
Wins the Muay Thai Champions League title.
1998-11-14	Win	(Netherlands) Rayen Simson	Muay Thai Champions League III, Semi Finals	Amsterdam, Netherlands	Decision	3	3:00
1998-09-07	Win	(France) Guillaume Caldeira					
Wins the 147lbs ISKA World kickboxing title.
1998-05-30	Loss	(France) Francois Pennacchio			Decision	12	3:00
For the 147lbs WAKO-Pro World kickboxing (low-kick) title.
1998-05-23	Win	(Netherlands) Gerald Zwane			Decision	5	3:00
1998-05-02	Win	(Netherlands) Abdullah Aouj	Muay Thai Champions League I, Quarter Finals	Roosendaal, Netherlands			
Qualifies for Muay Thai Champions League III, Semi Finals.
1998-05-02	Win	(Netherlands) Najim Ettouhlali	Muay Thai Champions League I, 1st Round	Roosendaal, Netherlands			
1998-04-25	Win	(United Kingdom) Eval Denton					
Wins the 147lbs WKA World title.
1998-04-00	Win	(Japan) Takashi Ito		France	KO(Body shot with knee)	2	
1998-01-22	Win	(Germany) Guiseppe Timperanza					
Wins the 147lbs IKBF World kickboxing title.
1997-11-22	Loss	(Thailand) Saimai Chor Suananun	Tournoi des 50000 (67 kg), Semi Finals	Paris, France			
1997-11-22	Win	(United Kingdom) Ashley Guishard	Tournoi des 50000 (67 kg), Quarter Finals	Paris, France			
1996-12-05	Win	(Netherlands) Ramon Dekkers	Muay Thai World Championships in honor of the King	Bangkok, Thailand	Decision (Unanimous)	5	3:00
Wins the WMTA World Super Welterweight (154 lbs) title.
1996-11-25	Win	(Belarus) Sergei Havitzkin		Helsinki, Finland			
1994-11-06	Win	(France) Morad Djebli		Chiang Rai, Thailand			
1994-	Win	(Thailand) Chandet Sor.Prantalay		Bangkok, Thailand	Decision	5	3:00
1994-03-26	Win	(Australia) Paul Briggs		Brisbane, Australia	KO (Left low kick)	2	
Defends the WMC World Welterweight (147 lbs) title.
1994-01-27	Win	(Thailand) Vichan Chor.Rojanachai	Rajadamnern Stadium	Bangkok, Thailand	Decision	5	3:00
Wins the Rajadamnern Stadium Welterweight (147 lbs) title.
1992–1993	Win	(Suriname) Orlando Wiet		Germany			
1992-12-12	Win	(Thailand) Sittisak Toranusron		Malaysia	Decision	5	3:00
Wins the Rajadamnern Stadium Super Lightweight (140 lbs) title.
1992-08-15	Win	(Thailand) Nonglek Lukklongchan	Channel 7 stadium	Bangkok, Thailand	Decision	5	3:00
1992-05-31	Win	(Thailand) Sittisak Toranusron	Channel 7 stadium	Bangkok, Thailand	Decision	5	3:00
Defends 140lbs title.
1992-03-01	Win	(Netherlands) Ivan Hippolyte	Holland vs Thailand 7	Netherlands	Decision	5	3:00
1991-1992	Win	(United States) Tony Anderson		Oklahoma, United States	KO (high kick)	1	
1991-00-00	Win	(United Kingdom) Kash Gill		UK			
1991-00-00	Win	(France)					
Wins the WMC World Welterweight (147 lbs) title.
1991-03-17	Win	(Thailand) Mongkhondej Kiatprasarnchai	Channel 7 Stadium	Bangkok, Thailand	Decision	5	3:00
1990-10-14	Win	(Netherlands) Bayran Colak					
1990-07-29	Win	(Thailand) Pothai Chor.Waikul	Channel 7 Stadium	Bangkok, Thailand	TKO (Referee stoppage)	5	
1990-05-27	Loss	(Netherlands) Ivan Hippolyte	(155 lbs fight)	Phoenix, USA	TKO	3	
1990-04-21	Win	(Thailand) Sittisak Saksanguan	Lumpinee Stadium	Bangkok, Thailand			
Defends the Lumpinee Stadium Super Lightweight (140 lbs) title.
1989-11	Win	(Netherlands) Michel Ubbergen		United States	KO		
1989-08-12	Win	(Thailand) Pothai Chor.Waikul	Lumpinee Stadium	Bangkok, Thailand	Decision	5	3:00
Wins the Lumpinee Stadium Super Lightweight (140 lbs) title.
1989-01-09	Loss	(Thailand) Nokweed Davy		Phang Nga, Thailand	KO	1	
1988-11-05	Win	(Thailand) Saengthong Sitlakmuang	Lumpinee Stadium	Bangkok, Thailand	Decision	5	3:00
1988-08-14	Win	(Thailand) Rungsak Sitseinkuy	Channel 7 Stadium	Bangkok, Thailand	Decision	5	3:00
1988-06-26	Win	(Thailand) Phetmai Jockygym	Channel 7 Stadium	Bangkok, Thailand	Decision	5	3:00
1988-	Loss	(Thailand) Phromlikit Boonrot		Phuket, Thailand	Decision	5	3:00
1984-	Loss	(Thailand) Nokweed Devy		Thailand	KO	3	
For the South Thailand title.
Legend: Win Loss Draw/No contest Notes

== See also ==
- List of male kickboxers
