= S-Cup Europe 2008 =

- Promotion: Shoot Boxing Europe, East Side Promotions
- Date: September 20, 2008
- Venue: Oosterbliek Sporthal
- City: Gorinchem, Netherlands

Event chronology
Shoot Boxing World Tournament 2006	S-Cup Europe 2008	Shoot Boxing World Tournament 2008

S-Cup Europe 2008 was a martial arts event co promoted by Shoot Boxing Europe and East Side Promotions. It was a preliminary qualifying tournament for the Shoot Boxing World Tournament 2008, involving ten fighters (two being reservists) with all bouts fought under Shoot Boxing rules (70 kg/154 lbs). All the tournament fighters were invitees selected on the basis of their achievements in kickboxing, Muay Thai and Savate (more information on the fighters is provided by the bulleted list below). As well as tournament matches there were also a number of opening fights and super fights (including a retirement fight), and a W.P.K.L. European title fight. One of the opening fights was fought under Shoot Boxing rules while the rest of the matches were fought under Muay Thai rules. In total there were thirty four fighters at the event, representing twelve countries, with weight classes ranging from under 32 kg to over 95 kg.

The S-Cup Europe 2008 tournament was won by Denis Schneidmiller who defeated Dzhabar Askerov in the final by third round split decision. As a result of his victory Schneidmiller would qualify for the Shoot Boxing World Tournament 2008. Other notable results saw Ruben van der Giessen defeat Christian di Paolo to win the W.P.K.L. light heavyweight European title (79 kg/174 lbs), while Gerald Zwane was unable to get a victory in his final bout, losing to Jan van Denderen by decision after three rounds. The event was held at the Oosterbliek Sporthal in Gorinchem, Netherlands on Saturday, 20 September 2008.

Tournament finalists

- (United Arab Emirates) Dzhabar Askerov - x2 Muay Thai world champion, The Contender Asia last 4
- (Slovakia) Rudolf Durica - W.M.C. intercontinental champion '07, former world and European champion
- (Croatia) Goran Borović - W.I.P.U. "King of the Ring" Muay Thai world champion '06, x2 Savate world champion
- (Sweden) Joakim Karlsson - I.F.M.A. Muay Thai Amateur World Championships '06 silver medalist
- (France) Malik Mangouchi - x2 kickboxing and Muay Thai world champion
- Luis Reis - It's Showtime Trophy Portugal '07 champion, K-1 MAX Portugal champion '06
- (Germany) Denis Schneidmiller - W.B.C. Muay Thai world champion '06, I.K.B.O. European champion '05
- (Netherlands) Chris van Venrooij - W.F.C.A. world champion '03, W.M.C. intercontinental champion '02, x2 European champion

Tournament Reservists

- (Armenia) Harut Grigorian - up and coming Belgium based Armenian kickboxer
- (France) Abdallah Mabel - W.F.C. world champion '07, W.P.K.C. intercontinental champion '05

== S-Cup Europe 2008 Tournament ==
Quarter Finals
(Croatia) Goran Borović
(Netherlands) Chris van Venrooij	DEC
(United Arab Emirates) Dzhabar Askerov	DEC
(Slovakia) Rudolf Durica
(Sweden) Joakim Karlsson
(Portugal) Luis Reis	DEC
(France) Malik Mangouchi
(Germany) Denis Schneidmiller	DEC

Semi Finals
(Netherlands) Chris van Venrooij
(United Arab Emirates) Dzhabar Askerov	DEC
(Portugal) Luis Reis
(Germany) Denis Schneidmiller	DEC

Final
(United Arab Emirates) Dzhabar Askerov
(Germany) Denis Schneidmiller	DEC

== Results ==
S-Cup Europe 2008 Results
Opening Fight 1 (Youth) -32 kg: Muay Thai Rules / 1Min. 3R
(Netherlands) Justin Marlon Sweebe def. Anthony Schwandt (Germany)
Sweebe defeated Schwandt by TKO in the 1st Round.
Opening Fight 2 (N-Class) -60 kg: Muay Thai Rules / 1.5Min. 3R
(Netherlands) Teun Versteeg def. John Boerraker (Netherlands)
Versteeg defeated Boerraker by 3rd Round Decision.
Opening Fight 3 (N-Class) -54 kg: Muay Thai Rules / 1.5Min. 3R
(Netherlands) Kenny Gade def. Gerard van de Waal (Netherlands)
Gade defeated van de Waal by 3rd Round Decision.
Opening Fight 4 (N-Class) -56 kg: Muay Thai Rules / 1.5Min. 3R
(Netherlands) Jeffrey de Nooyer draw. Rob van der Sluis (Netherlands)
Match resulted in a 3rd Round Decision Draw.
Opening Fight 5 (C-Class) -68 kg: Muay Thai Rules / 2Min. 3R
(Morocco) Samir Zahraoui def. Micho Giganovic (Netherlands)
Zahraoui defeated Giganovic by 3rd Round Decision.
Opening Fight 6 (C-Class) +95 kg: Muay Thai Rules / 2Min. 3R
(Netherlands) Seimen van Ieperen def. Matthias Peters (Germany)
Van Ieperen defeated Peters by TKO (Corner Stoppage, Injury) at 3:00 of the 2nd Round.
Opening Fight 7 (B-Class) -70 kg: Muay Thai Rules / 2Min. 5R
(Netherlands) Junior Engelhart def. Mohamed Akrich (Belgium)
Engelhart defeated Akrich by 5th Round Decision.
Opening Fight 8 –67 kg: Shoot Boxing Rules / 2Min. 3R
(Netherlands) Danny Verhoeven def. Maarten van den Eynde (Belgium)
Verhoeven defeated van den Eynde by 3rd Round Decision.
S-Cup Europe '08 Reserve Fight -70 kg: Shoot Boxing Rules / 3Min. 3R Ext.1R
(Armenia) Harut Grigorian def. Abdallah Mabel (France)
Grigorian defeated Mabel by 3rd Round Decision.
S-Cup Europe '08 Quarter Finals -70 kg: Shoot Boxing Rules / 3Min. 3R Ext.1R
(Netherlands) Chris van Venrooij def. Goran Borovic (Croatia)
Van Venrooij defeated Borovic by 3rd Round Decision.
(United Arab Emirates) Dzhabar Askerov def. Rudolf Durica (Slovakia)
Askerov defeated Durica by 3rd Round Unanimous Decision 3-0.
(Portugal) Luis Reis def. Joakim Karlsson (Sweden)
Reis defeated Karlsson by 3rd Round Decision.
(Germany) Denis Schneidmiller def. Malik Mangouchi (France)
Schneidmiller defeated Mangouchi by 3rd Round Decision.
Super Fight 1 (C-Class) -82.5 kg: Muay Thai Rules / 2Min. 3R
(Netherlands) Kevin van Houtem def. Franck Jourdain (France)
Van Houtem defeated Jourdain by 3rd Round Decision.
Super Fight 2 - Gerald Zwane Farewell Fight (A-Class) -82.5 kg: Muay Thai Rules / 3Min. 3R
(Belgium) Jan van Denderen def. Gerald Zwane (Netherlands)
Van Denderen defeated Zwane by 3rd Round Decision.
S-Cup Europe '08 Semi Finals -70 kg: Shoot Boxing Rules / 3Min. 3R Ext.1R
(United Arab Emirates) Dzhabar Askerov def. Chris van Venrooij (Netherlands)
Askerov defeated van Venrooij by 3rd Round Unanimous Decision 3-0.
(Germany) Denis Schneidmiller def. Luis Reis (Portugal)
Schneidmiller defeated Reis by 3rd Round Decision.
Super Fight 3 (A-Class) -69 kg: Muay Thai Rules / 3Min. 5R
(Netherlands) Hans Pasztjerik def. Jassem al Djiwal (Morocco)
Pasztjerik defeated Djiwal by 5th Round Decision.
W.P.K.L. Muay Thai Light Heavyweight European Title Fight -79 kg: Muay Thai Rules / 3Min. 5R
(Netherlands) Ruben van der Giessen def. Christian di Paolo (England)
Van der Giessen defeated di Paolo by 5th Round Decision.
S-Cup Europe '08 Final -70 kg: Shoot Boxing Rules / 3Min. 3R Ext.2R
(Germany) Denis Schneidmiller def. Dzhabar Askerov (United Arab Emirates)
Schneidmiller defeated Askerov by 3rd Round Split Decision 2-1.

== See also ==
- List of male kickboxers
