= Alessandro Campagna (kickboxer) =

Italian kickboxer

- Born: October 10, 1991 (age 35); Rome, Italy
- Nationality: (Italy) italian
- Height: 1.85 m (6 ft 1 in)
- Weight: 70 kg (150 lb; 11 st)
- Division: Welterweight
- Style: Muay Thai, kickboxing
- Stance: Orthodox
- Fighting out of: Rome, Italy
- Team: Pro Fighting Roma
- Trainer: Giorgio Perreca
- Years active: 2005–present

Kickboxing record
- Total: 40
- Wins: 32
- By knockout: 14
- Losses: 8
- By knockout: 1
- Draws: 0
- No contests: 0

Other information
- Occupation: Student
- Notable relatives: brother Antonio Campagna, Rome, Italy
- Last updated on: April 5, 2014

Alessandro Campagna (born October 10, 1991) is an Italian Welterweight kickboxer, fighting out of Pro Fighting Roma in Rome, Italy. He won an 8-man tournament in Paramaribo in Suriname called "Soema Na Basi", beating more experienced and quoted fighters from the Netherlands and Suriname.

== Biography and career ==
Born in Rome, Italy, he started to train kickboxing at the age of 10 and after a while he decided to practice Muay thai. He trained at Pro Fighting Roma followed by Alessio Smeriglio. He had his first fight at the age of 16. He has an older brother: Antonio Campagna, which fights too into the -61 Weight division and is currently K-1 Italian National Champion and is more active into the Amateur Tournaments, where he earned a Silver medal in Baku, Azerbaijan during the Wako European Amateur Championship. Alessandro is a full-time student and he practices as a professional fighter when he's not at school.

Campagna won against Fabio Pinca via unanimous decision in a tournament reserve bout at Glory 3: Rome - 2012 Middleweight Slam Final 8 to be held on November 3, 2012 in Rome,

After Glory World Series he changed Trainer and moved with Mr. Riccardo Lecca and Invictus team. He also is being followed on specific boxing trainer by the professional Italian boxer Mr. Marco Scafi.

He lost to Andy Riste via unanimous decision at Glory 6: Istanbul on April 6, 2013.

He lost to Jingreedtong by decision in the semi-finals of the four man tournament at MAX Muay Thai 4 in Sendai, Japan on October 6, 2013.

Campagna won against Hamza Imane via unanimous decision at Fight Clubbing: The European Edition, in Pescara, Italy on October 25, 2015, and became the new FIGHT1 PRO ITALIAN NATIONAL CHAMPION 73 kg.

Campagna lost to Enriko Gogokhia via first-round TKO at Oktagon Legend 3 in Milan, Italy on April 5, 2014, the first time he had been stopped.

Alessandro Campagna after his victory against the superstar Marco "The Sniper" Pique, decides to begin his new career as an amateur boxer (current amateur boxer Elite 81 kg) and then move in the future on professional boxing.

== Championships and accomplishments ==
- Italian F.I.K.B. K-1 National K1 Champion 2009
- OKTAGON 2011
  - Oktagon Italian selections winner 2011 with a total of 4 matches and 4 wins
  - Oktagon prestige fight winner 2011
- Soema Na basi 2011- 8 Man Tournament winner in Paramaribo, Suriname
- WAKO Pro K-1 Rules World Welterweight Champion +66.8 kg
- Ranked N.21 from Glory World Series Professional Rankings Lightweight Division
  - Fight1 PRO Italian Champion 73 kg 2015 in Pescara, Italy

== Sponsorship ==
Alessandro is currently sponsored by the Italian Brand LEONE1947, who also sponsor fighters Giorgio Petrosyan, Artur Kyshenko, and Gago Drago.

== Kickboxing record ==
Kickboxing record
42 wins (15 (T)KOs), 10 losses, 1 draw, 0 no contests
Date	Result	Opponent	Event	Location	Method	Round	Time
2015-12-20	Win	(Suriname) Marco Pique	Invictus Arena, Prestige Fight	Rome, Italy	Decision (unanimous)	3	3:00
2015-12-08	Win	(Morocco) Jouad El Byari	Fight Clubbing The Reality 2.0 Muay Thai Vs Sanda	Lecce, Italy	Decision (unanimous)	3	3:00
2014-10-25	Win	(Morocco) Hamza Imane	Fight Clubbing The European Edition	Pescara, Italy	Decision (unanimous)	5	3:00
Wins FIGHT1 Pro K-1 Italian Champion 73kg
2014-04-05	Loss	(Russia) Enriko Gogokhia	Legend 3: Pour Homme	Milan, Italy	TKO (left hook)	1	2:20
2014-03-09	Win	(Italy) Simone Del Vecchio	All 4 Glory K-Nok	Cento, Italy	Decision (unanimous)	5	3:00
2013-10-06	Loss	(Thailand) Jingreedtong	MAX Muay Thai 4, Semi Finals	Sendai, Japan	Decision	3	3:00
2013-04-06	Loss	(Suriname) Andy Ristie	Glory 6: Istanbul	Istanbul, Turkey	Decision (unanimous)	3	3:00
2012-12-08	Win	(Albania) Julian Imeri	Invictus Arena, Prestige Fight	Rome, Italy	Decision (unanimous)	3	3:00
2012-12-08	Win	(Romania) Daniel Guţă	Rome Kickboxing GP, Prestige Fight	Rome, Italy	Decision (unanimous)	3	3:00
2012-11-02	Win	(France) Fabio Pinca	Glory 3: Rome - 70 kg Slam Tournament, Reserve Bout	Rome, Italy	Decision (unanimous)	3	3:00
2012-05-05	Loss	(Belarus) Chingiz Allazov	La notte dei Campioni	Seregno, Italy	KO (punch)	1	
2012-04-14	Win	(Brazil) Luciano "Boinha" Lopez	Italia vs Brasil, Belt Title Fight	Piraju, Brazil	TKO (punch)	4	
Wins WAKO Pro K-1 Rules World Welterweight Title -66.800 kg.
2012-01-21	Win	(Italy) Corrado Zanchi	Yokkao Extreme, Prestige Fight	Milan, Italy	Decision (unanimous)	3	3:00
2011-08-26	Win	(Morocco) Miloud El Guebli	Soema Na Basi, Final	Paramaribo, Suriname	KO (punch)	1	
Wins SOEMA NA BASI 8 MAN TOURNAMENT 70KG
2011-08-26	Win	(Netherlands) Ajay Balgobind	Soema Na Basi, Semi Finals	Paramaribo, Suriname	Decision	3	3:00
2011-08-26	Win	(Netherlands) Mandela Antone	Soema Na Basi, Quarters	Paramaribo, Suriname	Decision	3	3:00
2011-04-30	Loss	(Albania) Julian Imeri	Ring Rules	Milan, Italy	Decision	3	3:00
2011-03-12	Win	(France) Philippe Salmon	OKTAGON 2011 MILAN	Milan, Italy	TKO (ref. stoppage)	1	
Wins Oktagon 2011 Tournament Selections
2011-02-19	Win	(Italy) Lorenzo Mosca	Oktagon Final	Quartu Sant'Elena, Italy	Decision	3	3:00
2011-06-02	Win	(Italy) Filippo Gallerini	Oktagon Semi Finals	Savignano sul Rubicone, Italy	TKO (ref. stoppage)	3	
2011-22-01	Win	(Italy) Guglielmo Carata	KnockOut Fight Night	Rome, Italy	Decision	3	3:00
2010-04-12	Loss	(Armenia) Harut Grigorian	"Janus Fight Night"	Padua, Italy	Decision	5	3:00
2010-23-10	Win	(Italy) Nicolosi Paolo	"Rome Grand Prix"	Rome, Italy	TKO (cut)	2	
2010-09-10	Win	(France) Houcine Bennoui	"Shardana K-1"	Santa Teresa Gallura, Italy	KO (punch)	1	
2010-04-10	Win	(Italy) Fabio Di Marco	"Shardana K-1"	Olbia, Italy	TKO (knee-cut)	1	
2010-20-02	Win	(Italy) Marco Lazzaretti	"XXL Fight Tribe"	Scandicci, Italy	KO (middle kick)	3	
2009-22-11	Win	(Italy) Wladimiro Laghi	"Gladiatori Atto IX	Bologna, Italy	KO	2	
Legend: Win Loss Draw/no contest Notes
