= Enriko Gogokhia =

Georgian-born Ukrainian kickboxer

- Born: Enrkco Gogokhia; March 26, 1991 (age 35); Zugdidi, Georgia
- Other names: Gudan
- Nationality: Georgian; Ukrainian
- Height: 1.77 m (5 ft 9 1/2 in)
- Weight: 70 kg (154 lb; 11 st 0 lb)
- Style: Muay Thai, kickboxing, boxing
- Stance: Southpaw
- Team: Sport Gym "Captain"; No1 Fight club

Kickboxing record
- Total: 49
- Wins: 42
- By knockout: 21
- Losses: 7
- By knockout: 1

Other information
- Boxing record from BoxRec

Enriko Gogokhia (Georgian: ენრიკო გოგოხია; born March 26, 1991) is a Georgian-born Ukrainian professional kickboxer and boxer.

As of 26 May 2016, he was ranked the #3 lightweight kickboxer in the world by LiverKick.com. In late 2016, he moved to the United States and switched to professional boxing.

== Career ==
He faced Erkan Varol in the super fight of the K-1 World MAX 2012 World Championship Tournament Final in Athens, Greece on December 15, 2012. After three dominant rounds he won the fight by unanimous decision.

He defeated Bruno Gazani by unanimous decision in the first round of the 2013 Tantneft Cup on February 23, 2013.

He took a controversial decision win over Sitthichai Sitsongpeenong on the Oktagon 2013 event that was Glory 7: Milan undercard in Milan, Italy on April 20, 2013.

He replaced Mike Zambidis in the four-man tournament at the Legend 1 event in Moscow, Russia on May 25, 2013 to fight Dzhabar Askerov in the semi-finals. He lost to Askerov in what Fight Sport Asia described as "one of the nastiest 70kg knockouts in recent history"

He was scheduled to fight Chingiz Allazov at Legend 2: Invasion in Moscow, Russia on November 9, 2013 but withdrew from the match due to injury and was replaced by Warren Stevelmans.

Gogokhia defeated Alessandro Campagna via first round TKO at Legend 3: Pour Homme in Milan, Italy on April 5, 2014.

== Titles ==
- 2015 Kunlun Fight 70 kg World Championship Finalist
- 2015 W5 Intercontinental Championship belt – 71 kg.
- 2012 Tatneft Arena World Cup 2012 (-70 kg) champion
- 2012 WKF -72,30 kg K-1 rules world champion
- Master of Sports of Ukraine Thai boxing
- 2009 I.F.M.A. World Muaythai Championships -63.5 kg (bronze)
- 2011 I.F.M.A. World Muaythai Championships -71 kg (bronze)

== Fight record ==
Kickboxing record
42 wins (21 (T)KOs), 7 losses, 0 draws
Date	Result	Opponent	Event	Location	Method	Round	Time
2016-01-23	Loss	(Thailand) Sitthichai Sitsongpeenong	Kunlun Fight 37 - World MAX 2015, Final	Sanya, China	Ext. R decision (1-3)	4	3:00
Fight was for Kunlun Fight 2015 World MAX World Champion.
2016-01-23	Win	(Australia) Victor Nagbe	Kunlun Fight 37 - World MAX 2015, Semi Finals	Sanya, China	Decision (unanimous)	3	3:00
2015-12-19	Win	(Georgia (country)) Davit Kiria	Kunlun Fight 35 Final 8	Luoyang, China	Decision	3	3:00
2015-10-31	Win	(Australia) Steve Moxon	Kunlun Fight 33 Final 16	Changde, China	Decision	3	3:00
2015-08-30	Win	(Austria) Foad Sadeghi	W5 Grand Prix Moscow XXX	Moscow, Russia	Decision	3	3:00
Wins W5 Intercontinental Championship – 71kg.
2015-07-18	Win	(China) Wang Weihao	Kunlun Fight 27 - Middleweight Tournament, Final	Nanjing, China	Decision	3	3:00
Qualified to Kunlun fight 2015 70kg World MAX Tournament Final 16.
2015-07-18	Win	(Japan) Miyakoshi Soichiro	Kunlun Fight 27 - Middleweight Tournament, Semi Finals	Nanjing, China	TKO	3	
2015-04-24	Win	(Democratic Republic of the Congo) Chris Ngimbi	W5 Grand Prix - Kitek	Moscow, Russia	Decision (unanimous)	3	3:00
2014-11-29	Win	(Slovakia) Jan Mazur	W5 Crossroad of Times	Bratislava, Slovakia	Decision	3	3:00
2014-10-11	Win	(South Africa) Warren Stevelmans	W5 Grand Prix - Rematch	Moscow, Russia	Decision (unanimous)	3	3:00
2014-04-05	Win	(Italy) Alessandro Campagna	Legend 3: Pour Homme	Milan, Italy	TKO (left hook)	1	2:20
2013-05-25	Loss	(Russia) Dzhabar Askerov	Legend 1, Semi Finals	Moscow, Russia	KO (left hook)	2	2:18
2013-04-20	Win	(Thailand) Sitthichai Sitsongpeenong	Oktagon 2013	Milan, Italy	Decision (split)	3	3:00
2013-03-30	Win	(Morocco) Hicham Boubkari	Tatneft Arena World Cup 2013 1st selection 1/4 final (-70 kg)	Nizhnekamsk, Russia	KO	2	0:15
2013-02-23	Win	(Brazil) Bruno Gazani	Tatneft Arena World Cup 2013 4th selection 1/8 final (-70 kg)	Kazan, Russia	Decision (unanimous)	4	3:00
2012-12-15	Win	(Turkey) Erkan Varol	K-1 World MAX 2012 World Championship Tournament Final, Super Fight	Athens, Greece	Decision (unanimous)	3	3:00
2012-11-25	Win	(Thailand) Berneung Topkingboxing	Thai Boxe Mania - 2012	Turin, Italy	Decision	3	3:00
2012-10-20	Win	(Russia) Maxim Smirnov	Tatneft Cup 2012 final	Kazan, Russia	Decision	4	3:00
Wins Tatneft Arena World Cup 2012 (-70 kg) title.
2012-07-19	Win	(Russia) Magomed Magomedov	Tatneft Cup 2012 semi final	Kazan, Russia	Decision	4	3:00
2012-06-02	Win	(Russia) Artur Alimirzoev	Tatneft Cup 2012 2nd selection 1/4 final	Kazan, Russia	KO	1	
2012-03-24	Win	(Italy) Bruno Franchi	Fight Code Opening Event, Dragons tournament	Milan, Italy	KO (body punches)	1	
2012-02-11	Win	(Estonia) Kevin Renno	Balt Fight Pro	Tallinn, Estonia	KO (low kick)	3	
Wins vacant WKF World title -72,30 kg (K-1 rules).
2012-01-21	Win	(Latvia) Valeriy Podoyakhin	Tatneft Cup 2012 2nd selection 1/8 final	Kazan, Russia	KO	3	1:43
2011-11-12	Win	(France) Philippe Salmon	Tatneft Cup 2011 final	Kazan, Russia	Decision (unanimous)	3	3:00
2011-10-15	Loss	(Netherlands) Abderahmane Ait Said	TK2 WORLD MAX Tournament, Semi Finals	Aix-en-Provence, France	Decision	3	3:00
2011-10-15	Win	(Turkey) Ismail Uzuner	TK2 WORLD MAX Tournament, Quarter Finals	Aix-en-Provence, France	Decision	3	3:00
2011-07-23	Loss	(United Arab Emirates) Dzhabar Askerov	Tatneft Cup 2011 semi final	Kazan, Russia	Decision	4	3:00
2011-05-28	Win	(Thailand) Yaokgalam Chatrakanok	Tatneft Cup 2011 2nd selection 1/4 final	Kazan, Russia	Decision (unanimous)	3	3:00
2011-04-09	Loss	(Greece) Mike Zambidis	W5 Grand Prix K.O, Semi Final	Moscow, Russia	Ext R. decision (unanimous)	4	3:00
2011-01-20	Win	(Georgia (country)) Sandro Berelashvili	Tatneft Cup 2011 2nd selection 1/8 final	Kazan, Russia	RTD	1	1:19
2010-05-13	Loss	(Russia) Urunbeck Esenkulov	Tatneft Cup 2010 2nd selection 1/4 final	Kazan, Russia	Decision (unanimous)	4	3:00
2010-03-28	Win	(France) Johny Tancray	K-1 World Grand Prix 2010 in Warsaw	Warsaw, Poland	Decision	3	3:00
2010-03-19	Loss	(Belarus) Vitaly Gurkov	K-1 World MAX 2010 East Europe Tournament, Semi Finals	Minsk, Belarus	Ex. R. decision	4	3:00
2010-03-19	Win	(Kazakhstan) Daulet Otarbayev	K-1 World MAX 2010 East Europe Tournament, Quarter Finals	Minsk, Belarus	Decision (unanimous)	3	3:00
Legend: Win Loss Draw/no contest Notes

Amateur Muay Thai record
Date	Result	Opponent	Event	Location	Method	Round	Time
2012-09-10	Loss	(Belarus) Vitaly Gurkov	2012 IFMA World Championships, Quarter Finals	Saint Petersburg, Russia	Decision		
2012-09-08	Win	(Argentina) Pablo Paoliello	2012 IFMA World Championships, First Round	Saint Petersburg, Russia			
2011-09-25	Loss	(Belarus) Vitaly Gurkov	I.F.M.A. World Championships 2011, Semi finals -71 kg	Tashkent, Uzbekistan	Decision	4	2:00
Wins 2011 IFMA World Championships -71kg Bronze Medal.
2011-09-24	Win	(Iran) Vahid Roshani	I.F.M.A. World Championships 2011, Semi finals -71 kg	Tashkent, Uzbekistan	WO		
Legend: Win Loss Draw/no contest Notes

== See also ==
- List of male kickboxers
