= Abraham Roqueñi =

Spanish kickboxer

- Born: Abraham Roqueñi Iglesias; April 16, 1978 (age 48); Torrelavega, Spain
- Other names: El Demonio ("The Demon")
- Nationality: Spanish
- Height: 1.73 m (5 ft 8 in)
- Weight: 70 kg (150 lb; 11 st)
- Division: Welterweight
- Style: Karate, Kickboxing, Muay Thai
- Stance: Orthodox
- Fighting out of: Torrelavega, Spain
- Team: Bushido Gym
- Trainer: Peter Rodriguez
- Rank: 3rd degree black belt in Karate
- Years active: 1998-present

Kickboxing record
- Total: 85
- Wins: 72
- By knockout: 34
- Losses: 11
- Draws: 2
- Last updated on: December 01, 2013

Abraham Roqueñi Iglesias (born April 16, 1978) is a Spanish welterweight kickboxer. He was the K-1 MAX Spain 2004 tournament winner, and is a former ISKA, WAKO and WFCA world champion. He holds notable wins over Gago Drago, Luis Reis, Andy Souwer, Giga Chikadze, and Artur Kyshenko.

== Career ==
Roqueñi began practicing martial arts with karate at the age of seven, and now holds a 3rd dan black belt in the discipline. He began kickboxing at 12 and had his first amateur fight as a 16-year-old.

Early in his career, he became the Iberian, Spanish and European champion before gaining further international recognition when he won the K-1 MAX Spain 2004 eight-man tournament on December 18, 2004. He knocked out Antonio Postigo and Willy Borrel in the quarter-finals and semi-finals, respectively, before taking a decision over Luis Reis in the final.

Roqueñi won the WAKO World Lowkick Championship on October 22, 2005, when he defeated Wallid Haddad. He made three defences of this title, against Ibrahim Tamazaev, Radhouane Amoulibi and Kevin Harper, over the course of the next year before winning his second world title on June 30, 2007, by beating Thai fighter Kit Sitphonlek by decision for the WFCA World Muay Thai Championship. He then lost this belt to Mohammed Rahhaoui on May 10, 2008.

On December 7, 2007, Roqueñi knocked out Franck Pétin to win the WFCA World Full Contact Championship. He then won his fourth world title on April 11, 2009, by KOing Tim Thomas for the ISKA World title at -70 kg.

On February 5, 2011, he caused a huge upset by defeating K-1 star Andy Souwer in Málaga, Spain. Roqueñi knocked Souwer down in round 2 en route to a decision win. Following this, he was invited to compete in the It's Showtime organization and made his promotional debut at Fix Events & Fightclub Group presents: It's Showtime 2011 on June 18, 2011, and beat Gago Drago by majority decision.

In late 2011, he joined the Thai Fight 2011 70 kg Tournament. He was unable to make it past the semi-final stage, however, as he was defeated by Frank Giorgi on November 27, 2011, in Bangkok, Thailand.

On January 21, 2012, he lost a unanimous decision to pound for pound #1 Giorgio Petrosyan in Milan, Italy.

He won the face versus Albert Kraus on April 28, 2012, in Torrelavega, Spain.

He was scheduled to fight Yury Bessmertny in Nitra, Slovakia on October 27, 2012, but Bessmertny pulled out of the fight due to injury.

He defeated Xu Yan by unanimous decision in a tournament reserve bout at the K-1 World MAX 2012 World Championship Tournament Final in Athens, Greece on December 15, 2012.

On February 3, 2013, he will fight Dutch-based Georgian Giga Chikadze at Street Culture Fight Night 2 in Tenerife, Spain.

Roqueñi took a split decision win over Artur Kyshenko at Enfusion Live: Barcelona in Barcelona, Spain on March 9, 2012.

He beat Elam Ngor by disqualification at Enfusion Live: Tenerife in Tenerife, Spain on July 13, 2013. The fight was ruled a draw after three rounds and was set to go to an extension round to decide the victor, but Ngor apparently felt that he had already done enough and would be unable to beat Roqueñi on points in front of Spanish judges and so he left the ring, resulting in the DQ.

He was set to fight at the K-1 World MAX 2013 World Championship Tournament Final 16 in Majorca, Spain on September 14, 2013. However, he withdrew from the tournament as Street Culture Promotions, the co-promoter of the event, had not paid him for his fights with Xu Yan and Artur Kyshenko.

He beat Emmanuel Horta Vavares by first-round KO in the quarter-finals of the 2013 edition of Thai Fight's -70 kg/154 lb tournament in Thailand on October 23, 2013. Then he proceeded in semi finals and lost to Expedito Valin on November 30, 2013.

== Accomplishments ==
- WFCA Full Contact Kickboxing World Champion.
- WFCA Muay Thai World Champion.
- 4 times WAKO World Champion.
- ISKA World -70 kg Championship.
- ISKA European Champion.
- K-1 Max Spain Champion 2004.
- 2 time European Kickboxing Champion.
- Kickboxing champion of Spain.
- Spanish Full Contact Kickboxing Champion.
- 2 time Iberian Kickboxing Champion.
- Iberian Full Contact Kickboxing Champion.
- Multiple time Spanish Karate Champion of Spain, 3rd Dan.
- Cantabrian Amateur Kickboxing Champion.
- Spanish Amateur Kickboxing Champion.
- Spanish Neoprofessional Kickboxing Champion.
- Spanish Amateur Full Contact Kickboxing Champion.

== Kickboxing record ==
Kickboxing record
72 wins (34 KOs), 11 losses, 2 draws
Date	Result	Opponent	Event	Location	Method	Round	Time
2014-11-15	Loss	(Armenia) Marat Grigorian	Topking World Series 2 – 70 kg Tournament, Final 16	Paris, France	Decision	3	3:00
2013-11-30	Loss	(France) Expedito Valin	2013 Thai Fight -70 kg/154 lb Tournament, Semi-finals	Bangkok, Thailand	Decision	3	3:00
2013-10-23	Win	(Cape Verde) Emmanuel Horta Tavares	2013 Thai Fight -70 kg/154 lb Tournament, Quarter-finals	Bangkok, Thailand	KO (left hook to the body)	1	
2013-07-13	Win	(Senegal) Elam Ngor	Enfusion Live: Tenerife	Tenerife, Spain	DQ (Ngor left the ring)	3	3:00
2013-03-09	Win	(Ukraine) Artur Kyshenko	Enfusion Live: Barcelona	Barcelona, Spain	Decision (split)	3	3:00
2013-02-03	Win	(Georgia (country)) Giga Chikadze	Street Culture Fight Night 2	Tenerife, Spain	KO (back kick)	1	
2012-12-15	Win	(China) Xu Yan	K-1 World MAX 2012 World Championship Tournament Final, Reserve Bout	Athens, Greece	Decision (Unanimous)	3	3:00
2012-05-27	Loss	(Netherlands) Andy Souwer	K-1 World MAX 2012 World Championship Tournament Final 16	Madrid, Spain	Decision (Split)	3	3:00
2012-04-14	Win	(Netherlands) Albert Kraus	Born To Fight	Torrelavega, Spain	Decision	3	3:00
2012-01-21	Loss	(Italy) Giorgio Petrosyan	Yokkao Extreme 2012	Milan, Italy	Decision (unanimous)	3	3:00
2011-11-27	Loss	(Australia) Frank Giorgi	Thai Fight 2011 70 kg Tournament, Semi-finals	Bangkok, Thailand	Decision	3	3:00
2011-09-25	Win	(Portugal) José Barradas	Thai Fight	Bangkok, Thailand	Decision	3	3:00
2011-05-16	Win	(Armenia) Gago Drago	Fix Events & Fightclub Group presents: It's Showtime 2011	Madrid, Spain	Decision (Split)	3	3:00
2011-02-05	Win	(Netherlands) Andy Souwer	El Desafio K-1 Rules	Málaga, Spain	Decision	3	3:00
2010-05-16	Win	(Portugal) Gil Silva		Camargo, Spain	Decision	5	
2010-03-06	Win	(France) Mickael Lallemand	Apocalipsis V	Torrelavega, Spain	KO	2	
2009-06-13	Win	(Netherlands) Chris van Venrooij	Apocalipsis IV	Bilbao, Spain	Decision	5	3:00
2009-05-02	Loss	(Thailand) Sak Kaoponlek	S-1 Muay Thai	Italy	Decision		
2009-04-11	Win	(England) Tim Thomas		Laredo, Spain	KO	7	
Wins ISKA World -70kg Championship.
2009-02-20	Win	(Spain) Rafi Zouheir		Madrid, Spain	Decision	5	3:00
2008-12-06	Win	(Portugal) Diogo Calado		Tenerife, Spain	Decision	5	2:00
2008-11-15	Win	(Italy) Saro Presti	Apocalipsis III	Bilbao, Spain	KO		
2008-10-12	Win	(Spain) Jose Miguel García	The War	Barcelona, Spain	Decision	5	2:00
2008-05-10	Loss	(Morocco) Mohammed Rahhaoui		Torrelavega, Spain	Decision	5	3:00
Loses WFCA World Muay Thai Championship.
2007-12-07	Win	(France) Franck Pétin		Saint-Quentin, France	KO	7	
Wins WFCA World Full Contact Championship.
2007-06-30	Win	(Thailand) Kit Sitphonlek		Santander, Spain	Decision	5	3:00
Wins WFCA World Muay Thai Championship.
2007-06-02	Win	(Netherlands) Kamal Chabrani	Torneo Apocalipsis II, Final	Bilbao, Spain	Decision		
Wins Torneo Apocalipsis II tournament title.
2007-06-02	Win	(France) Sylvain Ginon	Torneo Apocalipsis II, Semi-finals	Bilbao, Spain	Decision		
2007-06-02	Win	(Netherlands) Chris van Venrooij	Torneo Apocalipsis II, Quarter-finals	Bilbao, Spain	Decision		
2007-04-08	Loss	(Suriname) Marco Piqué	Balans Fight Night	Tilburg, Netherlands	TKO (corner stoppage)	1	
2007-02-03	Win	(France) Nicolas Cabello		Barcelona, Spain	KO	2	
2006-12-02	Win	(England) Kevin Harper		Torrelavega, Spain	Decision	5	
Defends WAKO World Lowkick Championship.
2006-06-17	Draw	(Portugal) Luis Reis	Apocalipsis I	Bilbao, Spain	Decision	5	2:00
2006-05-20	Win	(France) Radhouane Amoulibi		Paris, France	KO	1	
Defends WAKO World Lowkick Championship.
2006-02-19	Draw	(Russia) Ibrahim Tamazaev		Torrelavega, Spain	Decision	5	3:00
Defends WAKO World Lowkick Championship.
2005-10-22	Win	(France) Wallid Haddad		Torrelavega, Spain	Decision		
Wins WAKO World Lowkick Championship.
2005-06-18	Win	(Netherlands) Randell Handel	W.K.N. Full Contact Tournament				
2004-12-18	Win	(Portugal) Luis Reis	K-1 MAX Spain 2004, Final	Guadalajara, Spain	Decision	3	3:00
Wins K-1 MAX Spain 2004 tournament title.
2004-12-18	Win	(France) Willy Borrel	K-1 MAX Spain 2004, Semi-finals	Guadalajara, Spain	KO		
2004-12-18	Win	(Portugal) Antonio Postigo	K-1 MAX Spain 2004, Quarter-finals	Guadalajara, Spain	KO		
2001	Win	(France) Riad Rekis					
2000-05-13	Win	(Belgium) Alain Dumas		Torrelavega, Spain	KO	5	
Wins ISKA European Championship.
1998	Win	(Spain) Rafael Del Toro			Decision	7	
