= Gago Drago =

Dutch kickboxer (born 1985)

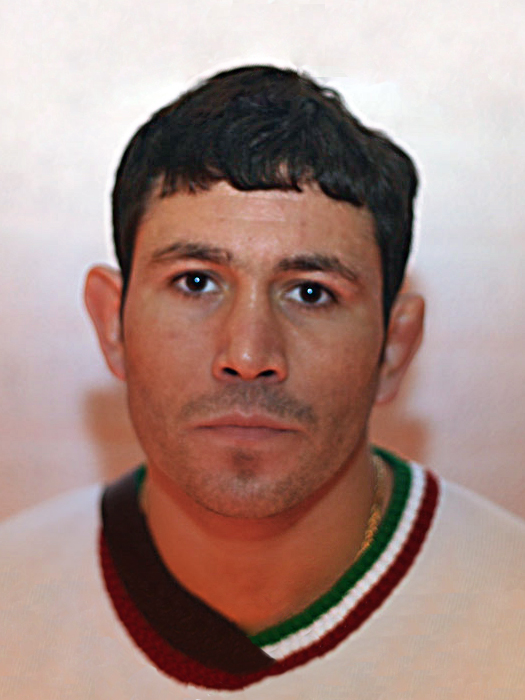
- Born: Gagik Arutyunyan; 8 March 1985 (age 41); Verishen, Armenian SSR, Soviet Union
- Native name: Գագո Դրագո
- Other names: Drago
- Nationality: Dutch
- Height: 1.75 m (5 ft 9 in)
- Weight: 70 kg (154 lb; 11 st 0 lb)
- Division: Welterweight
- Style: Muay Thai, kickboxing
- Stance: Orthodox
- Fighting out of: Alkmaar, Netherlands
- Team: Loeks Gym Alkmaar
- Trainer: Peter van Os
- Years active: 2001–present

Kickboxing record
- Total: 108
- Wins: 76
- By knockout: 36
- Losses: 26
- By knockout: 6
- Draws: 4
- No contests: 2

Other information
- Website: www.gagodrago.com
- Last updated on: 26 April 2014

Gagik Harutyunyan (Armenian: Գագիկ Հարությունյան; born 8 March 1985), better known as Gago Drago, is an Armenian-born Dutch welterweight kickboxer. He is known for his punch combinations and unpredictable kicking techniques and highly aggressive fighting style. Gago competed in K1-MAX and is trained at Loeks Gym, by Edwin van Os.

== Biography and career ==
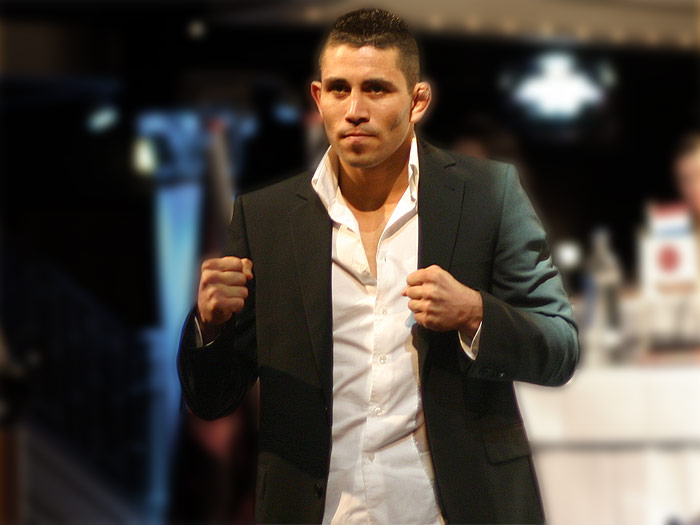
Gago Drago in 2014

Gago Drago was born in Verishen, Armenian SSR, Soviet Union on 8 March 1985. In 1989, due to the First Nagorno-Karabakh War, he moved, together with his family, to the Netherlands. At the age of 14 he started training kickboxing at Gym Alkmaar. First as a sparring partner of well-known fighters like Sahin Yakut and Dennis "Rus" Sharoykin. By the age of 20, his name Gagik Haroetjunjan, was replaced by "Gago Drago", when he was fighting his way up in the Dutch and Belgian kickboxing circuit. Early in his career he was not allowed to travel out of the Benelux because of his visa issues. Finally in 2005 he received his Dutch citizenship and was free to fight anywhere in the world.

Drago's "very aggressive" fighting style is credited as a big part of his success amongst fans. From 2002 to February 2006 he went four years unbeaten. This winning streak was stopped against Faldir Chahbari during a WFCA-event in the Netherlands on 5 February 2006.

On 5 April 2006 Gago made his debut at the K-1 World MAX 2006 World Tournament Open. In the final eliminations he fought against Danish Ole Laursen. After a nervous start Drago gave his opponent a standing 8-count in the second round and took the three round unanimous decision, placing himself among the top 8 fighters in the K-1 MAX division.

On 13 May 2006 he fought a Superfight against Ray Staring at the K-1 World Grand Prix 2006 in Amsterdam. He lost the fight on points.

Almost two months later on the 30 June 2006 Drago fought on his first K-1 World MAX Finals. In the first round he landed a knee on 2002 K-1 World MAX Champion Albert Kraus to score a knockdown and give him an eight-count. The outcome was a point-victory for Drago who advanced to the semi-finals against Buakaw Por. Pramuk. Gago got knocked down in the second round and lost by unanimous decision, ending the night for the young debutant. His opponent Buakaw Por. Pramuk went on to win the World MAX Title.

Drago fought against Naoki Samukawa at the K-1 World MAX 2006 Champions' Challenge in Tokyo, Japan on 4 September 2006. He won the fight by unanimous decision.

On 3 October 2007 at the K-1 World MAX 2007 World Championship Final, Gago Drago fought the 2005 K-1 World Max Champion Andy Souwer in the tournament quarter finals and was defeated by right hook KO.

Drago later entered the 2010 Enfusion Kickboxing Tournament. Drago made his way to the finals, where he fought highly regarded Muay Thai fighter Pajonsuk. Drago won the bout by unanimous decision, handing the Thai his first loss in over two years and becoming the 2010 Enfusion Kickboxing Tournament Champion.

At the K-1 World MAX 2010 World Championship Tournament Final, Drago defeated rising star Mohammed Khamal in the quarter-finals, but lost to Yoshihiro Sato by decision in a competitive bout in the semi-finals. Drago stayed behind however to support his friend, Giorgio Petrosyan, who defeated Sato in the finals.

Drago faced Batu Khasikov at Battle of Moscow 8 in Moscow on 3 November 2012 and lost via knockout in round one.

He faced Omar Amrani at Mix Fight Gala XV in Darmstadt, Germany on 26 April 2014. Drago won via TKO in round two.

== Titles ==
- 2010 Enfusion Kickboxing Tournament Champion -70 kg
- K-1 World MAX 2010 semifinalist
- K-1 World MAX 2006 semifinalist
- 2004 WMTC European Muay Thai Champion (1 title defense)
- 2002 Benelux Muay Thai Champion

== Kickboxing record ==
Kickboxing record
76 wins (36 (T)KOs, 40 decisions), 26 losses, 4 draws
Date	Result	Opponent	Event	Location	Method	Round	Time
2014-04-26	Win	(Germany) Omar Amrani	Mix Fight Gala XV	Darmstadt, Germany	TKO	2	1:53
2012-11-03	Loss	(Russia) Batu Khasikov	Battle of Moscow 8	Moscow, Russia	KO (right cross)	1	
2012-09-08	Win	(Syria) Baker Barakat	Merseburger Fight Night	Merseburg, Germany	Ext. R. decision	4	3:00
2012-05-27	Loss	(Suriname) Andy Ristie	K-1 World MAX 2012 World Championship Tournament Final 16	Madrid, Spain	Decision (unanimous)	3	3:00
2012-02-05	Loss	(Belarus) Yuri Bessmertny	Thai Boxe Mania	Turin, Italy	KO (right high kick)		
2011-11-06	Loss	(Thailand) Bovy Sor Udomson	Shoot the Shooto 2011	Tokyo, Japan	Decision (unanimous)	3	3:00
2011-09-24	Loss	(Ukraine) Artur Kyshenko	BFN Group & Music Hall presents: It's Showtime "Fast & Furious 70MAX", Quarter-finals	Brussels, Belgium	TKO (referee stoppage)	3	1:03
2011-06-18	Loss	(Spain) Abraham Roqueñi	It's Showtime Madrid 2011	Madrid, Spain	Decision (split)	3	3:00
2011-03-06	Loss	(Ukraine) Artur Kyshenko	It's Showtime Sporthallen Zuid	Amsterdam, Netherlands	Decision (5-0)	3	3:00
2010-12-11	Loss	(Turkey) Yavuz Kayabasi	Yiannis Evgenikos presents: It's Showtime Athens	Athens, Greece	Decision (4-1)	3	3:00
2010-11-08	Loss	(Japan) Yoshihiro Sato	K-1 World MAX 2010 Final, Semi-finals	Tokyo, Japan	Decision (unanimous)	3	3:00
2010-11-08	Win	(Morocco) Mohammed Khamal	K-1 World MAX 2010 Final, Quarter-finals	Tokyo, Japan	Decision (unanimous)	3	3:00
2010-10-03	Win	(South Korea) Su Hwan Lee	K-1 World MAX 2010 Final 16 - Part 2	Seoul, South Korea	KO (right high kick)	2	2:52
Qualifies for K-1 World MAX 2010 Final.
2010-09-12	Loss	(Morocco) Mohammed Medhar	Fightingstars presents: It's Showtime 2010	Amsterdam, Netherlands	Decision (4-1)	3	3:00
2010-07-10	Win	(Thailand) Pajonsuk	Enfusion Kickboxing Tournament '10, Final	Lisbon, Portugal	Decision	3	3:00
Wins Enfusion Kickboxing Final 4 2010 tournament title -70 kg.
2010-07-10	Win	(England) Rick Barnhill	Enfusion Kickboxing Tournament '10, Semi-finals	Lisbon, Portugal	KO	2	
2010-05-29	Loss	(Netherlands) Leroy Kaestner	It's Showtime 2010 Amsterdam	Amsterdam, Netherlands	Decision (4-1)	3	3:00
2010-03-06	Loss	(Portugal) José Reis	Gala Internacional de Kickboxing	Alenquer, Portugal	Decision	5	3:00
Fight was for W.F.C.A. K-1 Rules (72.5kg) World title.
2010-02-13	Win	(Japan) Yutaro Yamauchi	It's Showtime 2010 Prague	Prague, Czech Republic	Decision (unanimous)	3	3:00
2010-01-?	Win	(Finland) Pasi Luukkanen	Enfusion Kickboxing Tournament '10, 2nd round	Ko Samui, Thailand	Decision	3	3:00
Qualifies for Enfusion Kickboxing Tournament, Semi-finals.
2010-01-?	Win	(Portugal) Bruno de Carvalho	Enfusion Kickboxing Tournament '10, 1st round	Ko Samui, Thailand	Decision	3	3:00
2009-11-20	Loss	(Sweden) Marcus Öberg	K-1 Rumble of the Kings 2009 in Stockholm	Stockholm, Sweden	Decision (unanimous)	3	3:00
2009-10-26	Win	(Japan) Taishin Kohiruimaki	K-1 World MAX 2009 Final, Super Fight	Yokohama, Japan	Decision (unanimous)	3	3:00
2009-08-29	Win	(Romania) Barnabas Szücs	It's Showtime 2009 Budapest	Budapest, Hungary	Ext.R TKO (ref. stop/gave up)	4	0:46
2009-07-13	Loss	(Japan) Yuya Yamamoto	K-1 World MAX 2009 Final 8	Tokyo, Japan	Decision (unanimous)	3	3:00
Fails to qualify for the K-1 World MAX 2009 Final although will be invited to take part in a Super Fight.
2009-05-16	Win	(Netherlands) William Diender	It's Showtime 2009 Amsterdam	Amsterdam, Netherlands	TKO (doc. stop/cut)	3	
2009-04-21	Win	(Japan) Yoshihiro Sato	K-1 World MAX 2009 Final 16	Fukuoka, Japan	Ext. R. decision (unanimous)	4	3:00
Qualifies for K-1 World MAX 2009 Final 8.
2009-02-08	Loss	(Turkey) Murat Direkçi	Fights at the Border presents: It's Showtime 2009	Antwerp, Belgium	TKO (referee stoppage)	1	2:23
Fight was for vacant It's Showtime 70MAX World title.
2008-11-29	Loss	(Morocco) Chahid Oulad El Hadj	It's Showtime 2008 Eindhoven	Eindhoven, Netherlands	Decision	3	3:00
2008-09-06	Win	(United States) James Martinez	It's Showtime 2008 Alkmaar	Alkmaar, Netherlands	KO (right high kick)	1	2:03
2008-07-07	Loss	(Japan) Masato	K-1 World MAX 2008 Final 8	Tokyo, Japan	Decision (unanimous)	3	3:00
Fails to qualify for K-1 World MAX 2008 Final.
2008-05-31	Loss	(Netherlands) William Diender	Beast of the East	Zutphen, Netherlands	KO (right hook)	2	1:26
2008-04-26	Win	(South Africa) Warren Stevelmans	K-1 World GP 2008 in Amsterdam	Amsterdam, Netherlands	Decision (majority)	3	3:00
2008-04-09	Win	(Northern Mariana Islands) Gori	K-1 World MAX 2008 Final 16	Hiroshima, Japan	KO (left hook)	3	2:56
Qualifies for K-1 World MAX 2008 Final 8.
2008-03-15	Draw	(Morocco) Chahid Oulad El Hadj	It's Showtime 75MAX Trophy 2008, Super Fight	's-Hertogenbosch, Netherlands	Decision draw	5	3:00
2008-01-29	Win	(Portugal) Luis Reis	Kickboxing Champions League	Lisbon, Portugal	Decision (split)	3	3:00
2007-11-30	Win	(Portugal) Arnaldo Silva	Kickboxing Cup 2007	Lisbon, Portugal	Decision (unanimous)	3	3:00
2007-10-03	Loss	(Netherlands) Andy Souwer	K-1 World MAX 2007 Final, Quarter-finals	Tokyo, Japan	KO (right hook)	2	1:43
2007-06-28	Loss	(Greece) Mike Zambidis	K-1 World MAX 2007 World Tournament Final Elimination	Tokyo, Japan	Ext. R decision (unanimous)	4	3:00
Despite losing his fight Drago will be invited to K-1 World MAX 2007 Final.
2007-06-02	Win	(Algeria) Ait Naceur	Gentleman Gala	Tilburg, Netherlands	TKO (corner stoppage)	3	1:05
2007-04-04	Win	(Japan) Yutaro Yamauchi	K-1 World MAX 2007 World Elite Showcase	Yokohama, Japan	TKO (corner stoppage)	3	1:50
2007-02-25	Win	(England) Rick Barnhill	It's Showtime Trophy 2007 - Manchester, Super Fight	Altrincham, United Kingdom	KO (knee strike)	3	1:26
2007-02-04	Win	(Netherlands) Ray Staring	It's Showtime Trophy 2007 - Zwolle, Super Fight	Zwolle, Netherlands	KO (left high kick)	4	1:34
2006-12-03	Win	(Afghanistan) Bejan Ahmedi	It's Showtime 2006 Alkmaar	Alkmaar, Netherlands	KO (punches)	1	
2006-09-23	Win	(Morocco) Kamal Chabrani	It's Showtime 75MAX Trophy Final 2006, Super Fight	Rotterdam, Netherlands	TKO (ref stoppage, 3 knockdowns)	1	2:58
2006-09-04	Win	(Japan) Naoki Samukawa	K-1 World MAX 2006 Champions' Challenge	Tokyo, Japan	Decision (unanimous)	3	3:00
2006-06-30	Loss	(Thailand) Buakaw Por. Pramuk	K-1 World MAX 2006 Final, Semi-finals	Yokohama, Japan	Decision (unanimous)	3	3:00
2006-06-30	Win	(Netherlands) Albert Kraus	K-1 World MAX 2006 Final, Quarter-finals	Yokohama, Japan	Decision (unanimous)	3	3:00
2006-05-13	Loss	(Netherlands) Ray Staring	K-1 World Grand Prix 2006 in Amsterdam	Amsterdam, Netherlands	Decision (unanimous)	3	3:00
2006-04-05	Win	(Philippines) Ole Laursen	K-1 World MAX 2006 World Tournament Open	Tokyo, Japan	Decision (unanimous)	3	3:00
Qualifies for K-1 World MAX 2006 Final.
2006-02-04	Loss	(Morocco) Faldir Chahbari	WFCA Gala	Roosendaal, Netherlands	Decision (unanimous)	5	3:00
2005-12-18	Win	(Finland) Pasi Luukkanen	It's Showtime 75MAX Trophy Prague, Super Fight	Prague, Czech Republic	KO (punches)	2	1:20
2005-12-10	Win	(Belgium) Jan de Keyzer	Fights at The Border 4	Lommel, Belgium	KO (left high kick)	2	
2005-10-30	Win	(Netherlands) Franklin Semeral	It's Showtime 75MAX Trophy Alkmaar, Super Fight	Alkmaar, Netherlands	KO (right uppercut)	1	
2005-10-02	Win	(Netherlands) Jerry Morris	It's Showtime 75MAX Trophy Tilburg, Super Fight	Tilburg, Netherlands	Decision (unanimous)	5	3:00
2005-06-12	Win	(Turkey) Murat Direkçi	It's Showtime 2005 Amsterdam	Amsterdam, Netherlands	Decision (unanimous)	5	3:00
2005-04-23	Win	(Belgium) Abdoul Toure	Gala in Maldegem	Maldegem, Belgium	KO	1	
2005-03-19	Win	(Turkey) Ali Gunyar	Gentleman's Promotion Gala	Tilburg, Netherlands	TKO (doctor stoppage)	2	
2005-02-19	Win	(Belgium) Jan van Denderen	Test of Talents Gala	Mortsel, Belgium	Decision (unanimous)	5	3:00
2004-11-27	Win	(Belgium) Yassin Periquet	Test of Talents Gala "Battle at The Coast"	Mortsel, Belgium	TKO (doctor stoppage)		
2004-10-10	Win	(Egypt) Amir Zeyada	2 Hot 2 Handle	Rotterdam, Netherlands	Decision (unanimous)	5	3:00
2004-05-20	Win	(Croatia) Stjepan Veselic	It's Showtime 2004 Amsterdam	Amsterdam, Netherlands	Decision (unanimous)	5	3:00
2004-03-20	Win	(Thailand) Konorat	WPKL Muay Thai Champions League XII	Rotterdam, Netherlands	KO		
2004-02-21	Win	(Belgium) Marijn Geuens	Test of Talent Reloaded III	Mortsel, Belgium	KO (liver punch)	3	
Retains WMTC European title.
2004-01-25	Win	(Turkey) Ali Gunyar	Thaiboxing & Freefight event in Alkmaar	Alkmaar, Netherlands	TKO	2	
2004-01-21	Win	(Belgium) Marijn Geuens	Fights at The Border III	Lommel, Belgium	KO	3	
Wins WMTC European title.
2003-11-30	Draw	(Cape Verde) Alviar Lima	Killerdome IV	Amsterdam, Netherlands	Decision draw	5	3:00
2003-09-28	Win	(Belgium) Mohamed Ouali	WPKL Muay Thai Champions League XI	Rotterdam, Netherlands	TKO (doctor stoppage)	4	
2003-06-14	Win	(Germany) Rene Müller	K-1 Germany 2003	Bergheim, Germany	KO (knee strike)	1	
2003-06-08	Win	(Suriname) Imro Main	It's Showtime 2003 Amsterdam	Amsterdam, Netherlands	Decision (unanimous)	5	3:00
2003-04-06	Win	(Croatia) Stjepan Veselic	K-1 World Grand Prix 2003 Preliminary Holland	Netherlands	KO (right knee strike)	3	2:40
2003-02-15	Win	(France) Nadier Larecht	Xena Sport Victory Or Hell 8	Amsterdam, Netherlands	KO	2	
2002-11-30	Win	(Spain) Rafi Zouheir	WPKL Muay Thai Champions League VIII	Rotterdam, Netherlands	TKO (corner stoppage)	4	1:03
2002-11-24	Win	(Turkey) Murat Kumas	Xena Sport Victory Or Hell	Netherlands	KO (high kick)	1	
2002-10-27	Loss	(Netherlands) William Diender	Beast of The East	Arnhem, Netherlands	Decision (unanimous)	5	3:00
2002-09-29	Win	(Netherlands) Chris van Venrooij	It's Showtime – As Usual / Battle Time	Haarlem, Netherlands	TKO (corner stoppage)	4	1:28
2002-07-07	Win	(Suriname) Marco Pique	Bad Boys Day part. 1	Utrecht, Netherlands	KO (right high kick)	4	
2002-05-25	Win	(Belgium) Ludo Lasseu	Thaiboxing Gala	Antwerp, Belgium	TKO (corner stoppage)	2	
Wins Benelux Muaythai title.
2002-04-21	Win	(Suriname) Marco Pique	Xena Sport Victory Or Hell 7	Netherlands	Decision (unanimous)	5	3:00
2002-01-26	Win	(Netherlands) Chris van Venrooij	Gym Alkmaar Fight Gala	Alkmaar, Netherlands	Decision (unanimous)	5	3:00
2001-12-02	Win	(Morocco) Youssef Akhnikh	MTBN Fight Gala in Sporthal Holten	Marum, Netherlands	TKO		
Legend: Win Loss Draw/no contest Notes

== See also ==
- List of K-1 events
- List of K-1 champions
- List of It's Showtime events
- List of male kickboxers
