= Maxim Vorovski =

Estonian kickboxer

- Born: October 13, 1989 (age 37); Tallinn, then part of Estonian SSR, Soviet Union
- Height: 1.80 m (5 ft 11 in)
- Weight: 85 kg (187 lb; 13 st 5 lb)
- Division: Middleweight
- Style: Kickboxing
- Stance: Orthodox
- Fighting out of: Tallinn, Estonia
- Team: Team FightFit; Team Vorovski

Kickboxing record
- Total: 40
- Wins: 34
- Losses: 5
- By knockout: 0
- Draws: 1

Other information
- Website: https://vorovski.ee/
- Boxing record from BoxRec

Maxim Vorovski is an Estonian kickboxer, currently signed with King of Kings (KOK), where he is the interim middleweight champion.

As of July 2021, Combat Press ranks him as the #8 middleweight in the world.

== Professional kickboxing career ==
Vorovski was scheduled to fight Andrei Manzolo on the undercard of the September 14, 2013 Xplosion Series event. He won the fight by unanimous decision.

Vorovski was scheduled to fight Carlos De Graca on the March 15, 2014 Xplosion Series event. He won the fight by a third-round technical knockout.

Vorovski fought Alex Trofimov on the undercard of the 2014 Tatneft Cup Final, held on September 13, 2014. He won the fight by unanimous decision.

Vorovski was scheduled to face the Slovak Vladimír Idranyi at Xplosion 2014 on November 15, 2014. He won the fight by unanimous decision.

Vorovski was scheduled to fight Dawid Kasperski at Xplosion Fight Series 6 on May 9, 2015. He won the fight by unanimous decision.

Vorovski was scheduled to face Sahak Parparyan at Xplosion Fight Series 7 on September 19, 2015. He won the fight by an extra round decision.

Vorovski was scheduled to face Igor Lyapin at KOK in Tallinn on October 17, 2015. He won the fight by a third-round knockout.

Vorovski was scheduled to fight Alexander Oleinik at Nr1 Fight Show on May 13, 2016. He lost the fight by unanimous decision.

Vorovski made his last appearance of 2016 against Cheick Sidibé at Nr1 Fight Show on November 26, 2016. He won the fight by unanimous decision.

Vorovski was scheduled to face Stanislaw Zaniewski at Nr1 Fight Show on May 5, 2017. Vorovski won the fight by a first-round knockout, stopping Zaniewski midway through the round.

Vorovski made his Glory debut against Yassine Ahaggan at Glory 47: Lyon on October 28, 2017. He lost the fight by split decision.

Vorovski was scheduled to face Ertugrul Bayrak at Nr1 Fight Show on May 18, 2018. He won the fight by a third-round knockout, stopping the Turkish fighter at the 1:27 minute mark.

Vorovski faced Yuri Bessmertny at Nr1 Fight show on September 22, 2018. He lost the fight by unanimous decision.

Vorovski was scheduled to face Khalef Ghezal at Nr1 Fight Show Season 12 on November 23, 2019. He won the fight by unanimous decision.

Vorovski was scheduled to fight Andreas Iversen for the interim King of Kings middleweight title at KoK 89 on June 5, 2021. The fight was held at the T1 shopping center, without spectators, due to the COVID-19 pandemic. Vorovski won the fight by unanimous decision, outworking his opponent throughout the five rounds.

== Championships and accomplishments ==
- King of Kings
  - 2021 KOK Interim Middleweight Championship

== Kickboxing record(incomplete) ==
Professional Kickboxing Record
34 Wins, 5 Losses, 1 Draw
Date	Result	Opponent	Event	Location	Method	Round	Time
2024-05-18	Win	(United Kingdom) Charlie Sikwa	The League VI	Tallinn, Estonia	KO (Left hook)	3	
2023-11-04	Win	(France) Steven Mendes Furtado	The League V	Tallinn, Estonia	Decision	3	3:00
2021-06-05	Win	(Norway) Andreas Iversen	KOK 89	Tallinn, Estonia	Decision (Unanimous)	5	3:00
Wins the KOK interim Middleweight title.
2019-11-23	Win	(France) Khalef Ghezal	Nr1 Fight Show Season 12	Tallinn, Estonia	Decision (Unanimous)	3	3:00
2018-09-22	Loss	(Belarus) Yuri Bessmertny	Nr1 Fight Show	Tallinn, Estonia	Decision (Unanimous)	3	3:00
2018-05-18	Win	(Turkey) Ertugrul Bayrak	Nr1 Fight Show	Tallinn, Estonia	TKO (Punches)	3	1:27
2017-10-28	Loss	(France) Yassine Ahaggan	Glory 47: Lyon	Lyon, France	Decision (Split)	3	3:00
2017-05-05	Win	(Poland) Stanislaw Zaniewski	Nr1 Fight Show	Tallinn, Estonia	KO	1	1:43
2016-11-26	Win	(France) Cheick Sidibé	Nr1 Fight Show	Tallinn, Estonia	Decision (Unanimous)	3	3:00
2016-05-13	Loss	(Ukraine) Alexander Oleinik	Nr1 Fight Show, Season 5	Tallinn, Estonia	Decision (Unanimous)	3	3:00
2015-10-16	Win	(Ukraine) Igor Lyapin	KOK in Tallinn	Tallinn, Estonia	TKO (Punches)	3	2:57
2015-09-12	Win	(Armenia) Sahak Parparyan	Xplosion Fight Series 7	Tallinn, Estonia	Decision (Unanimous)	3	3:00
2015-05-09	Win	(Poland) Dawid Kasperski	Xplosion Fight Series 6	Tallinn, Estonia	Decision (Unanimous)	3	3:00
2014-11-15	Win	(Slovakia) Vladimír Idranyi	Xplosion 2014	Tallinn, Estonia	Decision (Unanimous)	3	3:00
2014-09-13	Win	(Russia) Alex Trofimov	Tatneft Cup 2014 Final	Kazan, Russia	Decision (Unanimous)	3	3:00
2014-03-15	Win	(Brazil) Carlos De Graca	Xplosion 2014	Tallinn, Estonia	TKO	3	
2013-09-14	Win	(Estonia) Andrei Manzolo	Xplosion	Tallinn, Estonia	Decision (Unanimous)	3	3:00
2012-02-23	Loss	(Russia) Dzhabar Askerov	United Glory 15	Moscow, Russia	Ex.Round. Decision	4	3:00
2010-10-16	Loss	(Netherlands) Robin van Roosmalen	United Glory 12: 2010-2011 World Series Quarterfinals	Amsterdam, Netherlands	Decision (Unanimous)	3	3:00
Legend: Win Loss Draw/No contest Notes

== See also ==
- List of male kickboxers
