= Cheick Sidibé =

French kickboxer

- Born: Cheick Sidibé; 12 September 1981 (age 45); Saint-Maurice, Val-de-Marne, France
- Other names: The Dancing Man
- Nationality: French
- Height: 1.85 m (6 ft 1 in)
- Weight: 81 kg (179 lb; 12 st 11 lb)
- Division: Light Heavyweight
- Style: Kickboxing
- Stance: Orthodox
- Fighting out of: Paris, France
- Team: J.M.BOXING ou Team James 92
- Trainer: Willy James
- Years active: 1997–present

Kickboxing record
- Total: 75
- Wins: 61
- By knockout: 25
- Losses: 12
- Draws: 2

Cheick Sidibé is a French light heavyweight kickboxer who has been professionally competing since 1997. He is the former two time World Boxing Council Muaythai, World Muaythai Federation, the World Muaythai Council MAD and FIBA light heavyweight champion.

== Kickboxing career ==
Cheick Sidibe began kickboxing in 1997, but changed disciplines to muay thai in 1999. He achieved his first major honor in 2004, when he became the national class B champion. After a second place finish in 2005 class B championship, he clinched the national class A title in 2005.

In 2006, he participated, with the French Muay Thai Team, in the Amateur World Championship held in Thailand. He lost in the quarterfinals to Artem Levin.

In 2011, he once again became the national class A champion. He also went on to become the FDMA champion, after defeating Kada Boumama.

In 2012, he once again faced Artem Levin, but would once again lose, this time through a 4th round doctor stoppage.

In March 2013 Sidibe won his first world title. He won the WMF belt after defeating Marcelo Tenorio in the second round by a TKO. In September of the same year, he faced Moustapha Jamaa for the FIBA Light Heavyweight Title. He won through a 2nd round TKO.

In 2014, he faced Diogo Calado for the WBC Muay Thai belt. He won the fight in after a second round doctor stoppage.

== Championships and accomplishments ==
=== Muay Thai ===
- Académie Française de Muay Thaï
  - 2004 National Class C Championship
  - 2005 National Class B Runner-up
  - 2006 National Class A Championship
  - 2011 National Class A Championship
- Fédération de Muaythaï et Disciplines Associées
  - 2011 FMDA Light Heavyweight Championship
- World Boxing Council Muaythai
  - 2012 WBC Light Heavyweight Runner-up
  - 2013 WBC Light Heavyweight Championship
  - 2014 WBC Light Heavyweight Championship
- World Muaythai Federation
  - 2013 WMF Light Heavyweight Championship
- World Muaythai Council
  - 2015 WMC MAD Light Heavyweight Championship
- FIBA
  - 2013 FIBA Light Heavyweight Championship

== Kickboxing record ==
Kickboxing record (Incomplete)
?? wins (25 KOs), 16 losses, 2 draw
Date	Result	Opponent	Event	Location	Method	Round	Time	Record
2018-7-4	Loss	(Romania) Constantin Rusu	Tatneft Cup	Kazan, Russia	Decision (Unanimous)	3	3:00	61-18-2
2017-9-22	Win	(United Kingdom) Steve Wakeling	Phoenix 3 London	London, United Kingdom	TKO	4	3:00	61-11-2
2016-11-26	Loss	(Estonia) Maxim Vorovski	NR1 Fight Show	Tallinn, Estonia	Decision (Unanimous)	3	3:00	60-17-2
2016-9-23	Loss	(Austria) Rene Wimmer	FFC 26	Linz, Austria	KO	3	3:00	60-16-2
2016-7-2	Loss	(China) Guo Qiang	Glory of Heroes 3	Jiyuan, China	KO	2	3:00	60-15-2
2016-2-27	Win	(Italy) Maldin Hamzai	La Grande Soirée de la Boxe	La Riche, France	Decision (Unanimous)	3	3:00	60-8-2
2015-12-5	Loss	(Czech Republic) Lukáš Dvořák	Gibu Fight Night 2	Prague, Czech Republic	KO	2	3:00	59-14-2
2015-11-7	Loss	(Switzerland) Ulrik Bokeme	Enfusion 33	Delemont, Switzerland	Decision (Unanimous)	3	3:00	59-13-2
2015-10-17	Loss	(China) Fang Bian	Wu Lin Feng World Championship 2015	Zhengzhou, China	Decision (Unanimous)	3	3:00	59-6-2
2015-3-14	Win	(Italy) Fabien Skenderaj	Grande Soirée de la Boxe	La Riche, France	TKO	1	3:00	59-5-2
Wins WMC MAD Light Heavyweight Title.
2015-2-21	Win	(Belgium) Mbamba Cauwenbergh	Le Choc des Best Fighters 3	Asnières-sur-Seine, France	Decision (Unanimous)	3	3:00	58-5-2
2014-3-19	Loss	(Serbia) Stevan Živković	Tatneft Cup	Kazan, Russia	Decision (Unanimous)	3	3:00	58-12-2
2014-3-1	Loss	(Slovakia) Vladimír Idranyi	Nitrianska noc bojovníkov 2014	Nitra, Slovakia	Decision (Unanimous)	3	3:00	58-11-2
2014-2-1	Win	(Portugal) Diogo Calado	Grande Soirée de la Boxe	La Riche, France	TKO	2	3:00	58-10-2
Wins WBC Light Heavyweight Title.
2013-10-5	Loss	(Brazil) Marcelo Tenorio	Copa Brasil de Muaythai	Rio Verde, Brazil	Decision (Unanimous)	3	3:00	57-10-2
2013-9-10	Win	(China) N/A	FIBA World Championship	Sanaa, Yemen	TKO (Injury)	2	3:00	57-9-2
Wins FIBA Light Heavyweight Title.
2013-4-27	Loss	(Belarus) Stanislav Zanevskii	Tatneft Cup 2013 - 1/4 finals	Kazan, Russia	Decision (Unanimous)	3	3:00	56-9-2
2013-3-23	Win	(Brazil) Marcelo Tenorio	WMF World Championship	Bangkok, Thailand	TKO	2	3:00	56-8-2
Wins WMF Light Heavyweight Title.
2012-11-29	Win	(Greece) Alexandros Chatzichronoglou	Tatneft Cup 2012 - 1/8 finals	Kazan, Russia	TKO	4	3:00	55-8-2
2012-11-17	Win	(Belgium) Yassin Boudrouz	La Nuit du Kick-Boxing	Belgium	Decision			
2012-11-03	Win	(United Kingdom) Lyndon Knowles	Muay Thai Mayhem	United Kingdom	Decision			
2012-05-12	Win	(Netherlands) Jason Wilnis	It's Showtime Kortrijk/Wevelgem	Wevelgem, Belgium	Decision	3	3:00	
2013	Loss	(Russia) Artem Levin	Martial Arts Festival "For Russia" - 2	Russia	TKO	4		
For The WBC Muay Thai 79KG Championship.
2012	Win	(France) Marcel Eastern	Nov Bojov 3	France	Decision	3	3:00	
2012	Win	(France) Malick Alloune	Combat le Juin	France	TKO (Injury)			
2012	Win	(France) N&A	Tafneft K-1 Finale	France	KO	4		
Tournament Winner 80KG.
2012	Win	(France) N&A	Tafneft K-1 Semi Final	France				
2012	Win	(France) N&A	Tafneft K-1 Quarter Final	France				
2011-11-17	Loss	(Portugal) Leonildo Évora	Tatneft Cup - 1/8 finals	Russia	Decision			
2011-08-09	Loss	(Russia) Vladislav Popov	Elite Fight Night Russia	Russia	Decision			
2011-06-11	Win	(France) Kada Bouamaa	Finales Championnat National FMDA	France	Decision			
Titre national FMDA -81 kg (-179 lb).
2011-06-04	Loss	(France) Issam Reghi	La Nuit Des Challenges 10	France	Decision			
2011-04-30	Loss	(France) Alassane Sy	Finales Championnat de France de Kick-Boxing	France	Decision			
Titre national FFSCDA -81 kg FMDA -81 kg (-179 lb).
2011-03-04	Win	(United Kingdom) Jimmy Smith	De France Thai Boxing	France	Points			
2011-02-26	Win	(France) Camille Gentelet	Championnat De France Kick Boxing	France				
2011-02-04	Win	(France) Didier Charlesege	1/2 Finales Championnat De France Kick Boxing	France				
2010-02-10	Win	(France) Christian Mendes	Nuit Des Spartiates	France	TKO	2		
2006-12-17	Loss	(Turkey) Yavuz Özden	A-1 World Combat Cup - Final	Turkey	Decision			
2006-09-21	Loss	(France) Jonathan Camara	A-1 World Combat Cup - Final 8	Turkey	Decision	4		
2006-09-09	Win	(Turkey) Apachi Serkan	A-1 Heat 1	Turkey	KO	1		
2006-04-29	Win	(France) Franck Nadje	Finales Golden Cup 2006	France	Decision			
2006-03-25	Win	(France) Mickaël Crosta	Championnat de France : 1/2 finale	France	TKO	2		
Legend: Win Loss Draw/No contest Notes

== See also ==
- List of male kickboxers
