= Artem Levin =

Russian kickboxer and Muay Thai practitioner (born 1986)

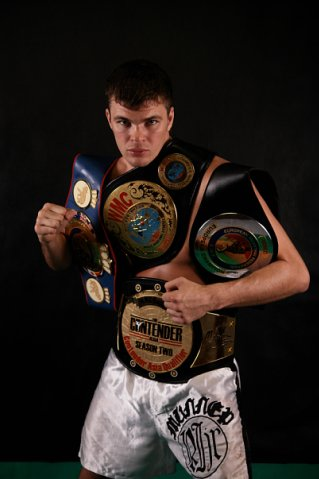
- Levin in 2010
- Born: Артё́м Вале́рьевич Ле́вин; December 8, 1986 (age 39); Prokopyevsk, Russian SFSR, USSR
- Native name: Артём Левин
- Other names: The Lion
- Nationality: Russian (Russia)
- Height: 1.91 m (6 ft 3 in)
- Weight: 84.8 kg (187 lb; 13.35 st)
- Division: Light Heavyweight; Middleweight
- Reach: 77 in (196 cm)
- Style: Muay Thai
- Team: Kuzbass Muay Thai
- Trainer: Vitaly Miller
- Years active: 2003–present

Professional boxing record
- Total: 1
- Wins: 1
- By knockout: 1
- Losses: 0

Kickboxing record
- Total: 64
- Wins: 55
- By knockout: 35
- Losses: 7
- By knockout: 2
- Draws: 2

Other information
- Boxing record from BoxRec
- Last updated on: March 27, 2019

Artem Valeryevich Levin (Russian: Артё́м Вале́рьевич Ле́вин; born December 8, 1986), also known as Artem "The Lion" Levin, is a Russian middleweight Muay Thai kickboxer fighting out of Prokopyevsk. He is the former Glory Middleweight Champion, as well as the former It's Showtime 77 MAX champion. He was ranked as a top ten middleweight by Combat Press between September 2014 and March 2022, peaking at #1.

== Career ==
=== Early years ===
He is the captain of Russian National Muaythai Team. He's become Chairman of the Athletes Commission at IFMA since 2012.

Levin moved up to light heavyweight after the SportAccord Combat Games in 2010.

The much-anticipated fight between Levin and Simon Marcus was scheduled for the third time and set for December 21, 2012, in Ekaterinburg, Russia and then February 23, 2013, before eventually settling on March 15, 2013, at Lion Fight 9 in Las Vegas with the inaugural Lion Fight Light Heavyweight Championship will be on the line. Although a closely contested bout, it was Marcus' clinching skills that made the difference as he took the unanimous decision win.

=== Glory ===
Moving up to 85 kg/187 lb, Levin defeated Sahak Parparyan via an extension round decision at Glory 7: Milan in Milan, Italy on April 20, 2013.

He competed in the four man 85 kg/187 lb tournament at Glory 10: Los Angeles - Middleweight World Championship Tournament in Ontario, California, United States on September 28, 2013. After cruising to a unanimous decision over Jason Wilnis in the semi-finals, he lost out to Joe Schilling in the final. He took round one but was knocked down in two when Schilling connected with a right overhand followed by a knee. The bout was ruled a draw after three rounds and went to an extension round in which Schilling scored a controversial knockdown and took the unanimous decision and the belt.

He was scheduled to fight Hicham El Gaoui for the WKN light heavyweight title at Diamond Fight: Friendship in Chelyabinsk, Russia on December 13, 2013 but the match fell through.

Levin defeated Robert Thomas via UD at Glory 16: Denver in Broomfield, Colorado, US on April 3, 2014.

Levin was expected to rematch Simon Marcus in a fight for the WMC World Light Heavyweight (175 lbs/79.379 kg) Championship at Monte Carlo Fighting Masters 2014 in Monte Carlo, Monaco on June 14, 2014. The bout was cancelled, however, in order for fighters to compete at Glory 17: Los Angeles which was held a week later.

=== Glory Middleweight Championship ===
Levin won the Glory 17: Los Angeles - Last Man Standing middleweight tournament and the inaugural Glory Middleweight Championship in Inglewood, California, on June 21, 2014, defeating Alex Pereira in the quarter-finals and Filip Verlinden in the semis, both by clear-cut unanimous decision, before rematching Joe Schilling in the final. He scored a knockdown with a spinning backfist in round one, but was docked a point by referee Al Wichgers for excessive clinching in three. He did enough to win, however, taking another UD, with all three judges scoring the bout 29-26 in favour of Levin.

Levin had his first title defense against Simon Marcus during Glory 21: San Diego. Levin successfully defended the title, as the fight ended in a majority draw. Referee Marcos Rosales took a point away from Levin in the third round for excessive clinching, with Levin later stating: "The rules allow five-second clinch, active clinch. I am quick, I am hitting knees. This is not right, what they do. I do not like it." Marcus was likewise unhappy with how the fight played out, stating: "This is bullshit, I won this fight."

Briefly moving away from Glory, Levin fought Daniel Alexandru for the WKN World Cruiserweight Muay thai title. Levin won the fight in the second round, knocking Alexandru out in the second round with a knee strike.

==== Controversial title loss ====
Levin's second Glory title defense was a rematch with Simon Marcus during Glory 27: Chicago. In the first round of the fight, referee Al Wichgers gave Levin a ten count after Levin was pushed down. In the second and third round, the referee took points away from Levin for, what he deemed to be, excessive clinching. Levin decided to leave the ring in the third round. The referee's actions during the bout, and the end of the fight itself were highly controversial, with one reporter claiming it was "one of the greatest embarrassments in the history of Glory, if not in the history of kickboxing." Following this fight, Levin decided to leave Glory, with both parties agreeing to mutually terminate his contract.

=== Late years ===
Levin won a unanimous decision against Ali El Ameri during Friendship Cup 11, after which Levin took a two year break from kickboxing. He returned in April 2018 to fight Igor Bugaenko during ACB KB 15: Grand Prix Kitek for the ACB KB Middleweight Title. He won the fight by unanimous decision. He would later be named the vice president of ACB kickboxing.

In his next two fights, Levin scored decision wins over David Mirkovsky and Zhou Wei.

== Titles ==
=== Professional ===
- Absolute Championship Berkut
  - 2018 ACB KB Middleweight Champion
- World Kickboxing Network
  - 2015 WKN World Cruiserweight (-88.5 kg) Muay Thai Champion
- Glory
  - Glory Middleweight (-85 kg/187.4 lb) Championship (one time; first; one defense)
  - 2014 Glory Middleweight (-85 kg/187.4 lb) Last Man Standing Tournament Champion
  - 2013 Glory Middleweight (-85 kg/187.4 lb) World Championship Tournament Runner-up
- WBC Muaythai
  - 2011 World Boxing Council Muaythai World Light heavyweight (175 lbs/79.379 kg) champion (1 def.)
- It's Showtime
  - 2010 It's Showtime 77 MAX World Champion (1 def.)
- The Contender Asia
  - 2008 The Contender Asia Season 2 Russian qualifying tournament champion
- Battle of Champions
  - 2008 Battle of Champions tournament World Champion
- World Muaythai Council
  - 2007 WMC Intercontinental title at 76 kg
  - 2007 WMC EMF European title at 76 kg

=== Amateur ===
- 2015 IFMA Russian Muaythai Champion (gold) (86 kg)
- 2015 IFMA Best Athlete of the Year
- 2014 IFMA Russian Muaythai Champion (gold) (86 kg)
- 2013 SportAccord World Combat Games Muaythai champion (gold) (81 kg)
- 2013 IFMA Russian Muaythai Champion (gold) (81 kg)
- 2012 IFMA World Muaythai champion (gold) (81 kg)
- 2012 IFMA European Muaythai champion (gold) (81 kg)
- 2011 IFMA European Muaythai champion (gold) (81 kg)
- 2010 SportAccord World Combat Games Muaythai champion (gold) (75 kg)
- 2010 IFMA European Muaythai champion (gold) (75 kg)
- 2009 IFMA European Muaythai champion (gold) (75 kg)
- 2008 Busan TAFISA World Games IFMA Muaythai champion (gold) (75 kg)
- 2007 IFMA World Muaythai champion (gold) (75 kg)
- 2006 IFMA World Muaythai champion (gold) (75 kg)
- 2006 WMF World Muaythai champion (gold) (75 kg)
- 2005 WMF World Muaythai champion (gold) (67 kg)
- 2004 IFMA European Muaythai champion (gold) (67 kg)
- 2003–2011 IFMA Russian Muaythai Champion

== Professional kickboxing record ==
Kickboxing record
56 (35 TKOs) wins, 7 losses, 2 draws
Date	Result	Opponent	Event	Location	Method	Round	Time	Record
2019-09-20	Win	(China) Zhou Wei	Wu Lin Feng 2019: WLF China vs Russia	Moscow, Russia	DEC (unanimous)	3	3:00	
2018-05-30	Win	(Poland) David Mirkovsky	Zhara Fight Show	Moscow, Russia	DEC (unanimous)	3	3:00	
2018-04-20	Win	(Belarus) Igor Bugaenko	ACB KB 15: Grand Prix Kitek	Moscow, Russia	DEC	5	3:00	
Wins the ACB KB Middleweight Title.
2016-10-29	Win	(Spain) Ali El Ameri	Friendship Cup 11	Novosibirsk, Russia	DEC (unanimous)	3	3:00	
2016-02-26	Loss	(Canada) Simon Marcus	Glory 27: Chicago	Hoffman Estates, Illinois, USA	DQ (forfeit)	3	2:55	
Loses the Glory Middleweight Championship.
2015-12-19	Win	(Romania) Daniel Alexandru	Muay Thai Moscow	Moscow, Russia	KO (knee)	2	2:32	
Wins the WKN World Cruiserweight (-88.5 kg) Muay Thai Championship.
2015-05-08	Draw	(Canada) Simon Marcus	Glory 21: San Diego	San Diego, California, USA	DEC (majority)	5	3:00	
Retains the Glory Middleweight Championship.
2014-06-21	Win	(United States) Joe Schilling	Glory 17: Los Angeles - Tournament, Final	Inglewood, California, USA	DEC (unanimous)	3	3:00	
Wins the Glory Middleweight Championship and the Glory Middleweight Last Man Standing Tournament.
2014-06-21	Win	(Belgium) Filip Verlinden	Glory 17: Los Angeles - Tournament, Semi Finals	Inglewood, California, USA	DEC (unanimous)	3	3:00	
2014-06-21	Win	(Brazil) Alex Pereira	Glory 17: Los Angeles - Tournament, Quarter Finals	Inglewood, California, USA	DEC (unanimous)	3	3:00	
2014-05-03	Win	(Canada) Robert Thomas	Glory 16: Denver	Broomfield, Colorado, USA	DEC (unanimous)	3	3:00	
2013-09-28	Loss	(United States) Joe Schilling	Glory 10: Los Angeles - Tournament, Final	Ontario, California, US	Ext. round DEC (unanimous)	4	3:00	
For the Glory Middleweight World Championship Tournament.
2013-09-28	Win	(Netherlands) Jason Wilnis	Glory 10: Los Angeles - Tournament, Semi Finals	Ontario, California, US	DEC (unanimous)	3	3:00	
2013-04-20	Win	(Armenia) Sahak Parparyan	Glory 7: Milan	Milan, Italy	Ext. round DEC (unanimous)	4	3:00	
2013-03-15	Loss	(Canada) Simon Marcus	Lion Fight 9	Las Vegas, Nevada, USA	DEC (unanimous)	5	3:00	
For the Lion Fight Light Heavyweight title.
2012-07-07	Draw	(England) Steven Wakeling	Xplosion Muay Thai	England	DEC	5	3:00	
2012-03-03	Win	(France) Cheick Sidibé	Martial Arts Festival "For Russia" - 2	Chelyabinsk, Russia	TKO	4		
Defends WBC Muaythai World Light heavyweight (175lbs/79.379kg) title.
2011-11-26	Win	(Bulgaria) Dimitar Iliev	Forward Challenge Riga 2011	Riga, Latvia	TKO (referee stoppage)	3		
2011-11-06	Win	(Italy) Roberto Cocco	Muay Thai Premier League: Round 3	The Hague, Netherlands	KO			
2011-09-24	Win	(Suriname) Murthel Groenhart	It's Showtime "Fast & Furious 70MAX"	Brussels, Belgium	KO (left knee to the body)	5	1:51	
Retains It's Showtime 77MAX title.
2011-09-02	Win	(Austria) David Keclik	Muaythai Premier League: Round 1	Long Beach, California, United States	KO (right flying knee)	3	2:28	
2011-06-11	Loss	(China) Fu Gaofeng	Wushu vs Muaythai	China	DEC	5	3:00	
2011-02-23	Win	(Thailand) Kaoklai Kaennorsing	Martial Arts Festival "For Russia"	Chelyabinsk, Russia	DEC	5	3:00	
Wins WBC Muaythai World Light heavyweight (175lbs/79.379kg) title.
2010-12-18	Win	(Morocco) L'houcine Ouzgni	Fightclub presents: It's Showtime 2010	Amsterdam, Netherlands	TKO (eye injury)	4	2:29	
Wins It's Showtime 77MAX title.
2010-11-19	Win	(Russia) Alexander Stetsurenko	Battle of Champions V - 81 kg	Moscow, Russia	DEC (unanimous)	3	3:00	
2010-07-29	Win	(Russia) Artem Vakhitov	Tatneft Arena World Cup 2010 1/2 final (80 kg)	Kazan, Russia	TKO	3	2:00	37-3
2010-04-30	Win	(Ukraine) Pavel Kharchenko	Tatneft Arena World Cup 2010 1/4 final (80 kg)	Kazan, Russia	KO (flying Knee)	2	0:57	
2010-01-31	Win	(Ukraine) Alexander Bruslavets	Tatneft Arena World Cup 2010 1/8 final (80 kg)	Kazan, Russia	TKO (corner stoppage)	2	3:00	
2009-10-23	Loss	(Russia) Alexander Stetsurenko	Tatneft Arena European Cup 2009 final (80 kg)	Kazan, Russia	TKO	4	3:00	
Fight was for Tatneft European Cup 2009 (80kg) title.
2009-09-26	Win	(Belarus) Dmitry Shakuta	Tatneft Arena European Cup 2009 1/2 final (80 kg)	Kazan, Russia	KO (left spinning backfist)	4	2:08	
2009-04-16	Win	(Belarus) Pavel Turuk	Tatneft Arena European Cup 2009 1/4 final (80 kg)	Kazan, Russia	DEC (unanimous)	3	3:00	
2009-01-31	Win	(Moldova) Vasile Cojocaru	Tatneft Arena European Cup 2009 1/8 final (80 kg)	Kazan, Russia	TKO (corner stoppage/broken nose)	3	2:48	
2008-12-19	Win	(Belarus) Vitaly Gurkov	The Contender Asia Qualifier	Chelyabinsk, Russia	TKO	1	3:00	
Wins The Contender Asia Season 2 8-man qualifier.
2008-12-19	Win	(Belarus) Dmitry Valent	The Contender Asia Qualifier	Chelyabinsk, Russia	DEC	3	3:00	
2008-12-19	Win	(Turkey) Ilter Demirci	The Contender Asia Qualifier	Chelyabinsk, Russia	DEC	3	3:00	
2008-12-05	Win	(Belarus) Maxim Balashko	Battle of Champions III	Luzhniki, Moscow, Russia	DEC (unanimous)	3	3:00	
2008-05-31	Loss	(Thailand) Yodsaenklai Fairtex	K-1 Scandinavia MAX 2008	Stockholm, Sweden	KO (right hook)	2	0:40	
Fight was for WMC Middleweight World title.
2008-05-09	Win	(United Kingdom) Richard Jones	Battle of Champions tournament	Chelyabinsk, Russia	KO (elbow)	1		
Wins OneSongchai Battle of Champions 4-man World tournament Champion.
2008-05-09	Win	(Netherlands) Winston Martens	Battle of Champions tournament	Chelyabinsk, Russia	DEC	3	3:00	
2008-03-28	Win	(Russia) Alexander Stetsurenko	Tournament of Real Men 12	Ekaterinburg, Russia	DEC (unanimous)	5	3:00	
Wins WMC Intercontinental (-76kg) title.
2007-11-03	Win	(Portugal) Vitor Pereira	Siberia Ice Sports Palace	Novosibirsk, Russia	KO (left knee strike)	1		
Wins WMC EMF Middleweight European title.
2007-08-24	Win	(Thailand) Slaton Lookbangyai	Thailand vs Russia IV	Kemerovo, Russia	KO (left knee strike)	2		10-1
2007-08-10	Win	(Thailand) Nonsai Sirisuk	Snezhinka Sports Palace	Prokopyevsk, Russia	KO (left knee strike)	4	1:45	
Wins WMC Middleweight Intercontinental title.
2007-05-20	Win	(Thailand) Nonthanun Por. Pramuk	K-1 Scandinavia GP 2007	Stockholm, Sweden	DEC (unanimous)	3	3:00	
2006-10-24	Loss	(Russia) Mikhail Chalykh	Fighting the World	Novocibirsk, Russia	DEC	3	3:00	5-1
2006-08-26	Win	(Thailand) Tum Mardsua	Thailand vs Russia III	Kemerovo, Russia	KO (left knee strike)	4		3-0
2005-06-12	Win	(Thailand) Slaton Lookbangyai	Thailand vs Russia II	Kemerovo, Russia	KO (elbows)	2		2-0
2004-12-18	Win	(Thailand) Surasak Dekli	Thailand vs Russia I	Kemerovo, Russia	DEC (unanimous)	5	3:00	1-0
Legend: Win Loss Draw/No contest Notes

Amateur Muay Thai and kickboxing record
56 wins, 1 loss
Date	Result	Opponent	Event	Location	Method	Round	Time	Record
2015-11-08	Win	(Russia) Armen Petrosyan	Russian National Muaythai Championship, final (86 kg)	Magnitogorsk, Russia	DEC	3	3:00	
Wins Russian National Muaythai Championship 86kg gold medal.
2015-11-07	Win	(Russia) Mikhail Sartakov	Russian National Muaythai Championship, semifinal (86 kg)	Magnitogorsk, Russia	DEC	3	3:00	
2015-11-05	Win	(Russia) Dmitry Khabibullin	Russian National Muaythai Championship, quarterfinal (86 kg)	Magnitogorsk, Russia	TKO	1	0:30	
2014-08-30	Win	(Russia) Armen Petrosian	Russian National Muaythai Championship, final (86 kg)	Sevastopol	DEC	3	3:00	
Wins Russian National Muaythai Championship 86kg gold medal.
2014-08-28	Win	(Russia) Vladislav Zhilenko	Russian National Muaythai Championship, quarterfinal (86 kg)	Sevastopol	KO	1	3:00	
2013-10-23	Win	(Belarus) Dmitry Valent	SportAccord World Combat Games, final (81 kg)	Saint-Petersburg, Russia	DEC	3	3:00	
Wins SportAccord World Combat Games 81kg gold medal.
2013-10-21	Win	(France) Boumama Kadda	SportAccord World Combat Games, semifinal (81 kg)	Saint-Petersburg, Russia	DEC	3	3:00	
2013-10-19	Win	(Argentina) Damian Bujan	SportAccord World Combat Games, quarterfinal (81 kg)	Saint-Petersburg, Russia	DEC	3	3:00	
2013-08-22	Win	(Russia) Evgeny Lyrschikov	Russian National Muaythai Championship, final (81 kg)	Kemerovo, Russia	DEC	3	3:00	
Wins Russian National Muaythai Championship 81kg gold medal.
2013-08-21	Win	(Russia) Nikolay Filonov	Russian National Muaythai Championship, semifinal (81 kg)	Kemerovo, Russia	DEC	3	3:00	
2013-08-19	Win	(Russia) Ahmed Ozdoev	Russian National Muaythai Championship, quarterfinal (81 kg)	Kemerovo, Russia	TKO	1	3:00	
2012-09-13	Win	(Belgium) Marc de Bonte	IFMA 2012 World Muaythai Championships, final (81 kg)	Saint-Petersburg, Russia	DEC	4	3:00	
Wins IFMA World Muay Thai Championships 81kg gold medal.
2012-09-11	Win	(Belarus) Dmitry Abdullin	IFMA 2012 World Muaythai Championships, semifinal (81 kg)	Saint-Petersburg, Russia	TKO	3	3:00	
2012-09-10	Win	(Sweden) Rickard Pettersson	IFMA 2012 World Muaythai Championships, quarterfinal (81 kg)	Saint-Petersburg, Russia	DEC	4	3:00	
2012-09-07	Win	(Iraq) Jabar Al-Kinani	IFMA 2012 World Muaythai Championships, preliminary bout (81 kg)	Saint-Petersburg, Russia	TKO (knee to the body)	3	1:35	
2012-04-22	Win	(Poland) Filip Kulawinski	IFMA 2012 European Muaythai Championships, final (81 kg)	Antalya, Turkey	DEC	4	3:00	
Wins IFMA European Muay Thai Championships 81kg gold medal.
2012-04-21	Win	(Belarus) Dmitry Abdullin	IFMA 2012 European Muaythai Championships, 1/2 final (81 kg)	Antalya, Turkey	DEC	4		
2012-04-19	Win	(France) Boumama Kadda	IFMA 2011 European Muaythai Championships, 1/4 final (81 kg)	Antalya, Turkey	DEC	4		
2011-04-29	Win	(Denmark) Rasmus Zøylner	IFMA 2011 European Muaythai Championships, final (81 kg)	Antalya, Turkey	Decision	4	2:00	
Wins IFMA European Muay Thai Championships 81kg gold medal.
2011-04-28	Win	(France) Boumama Kadda	IFMA 2011 European Muaythai Championships, 1/2 final (81 kg)	Antalya, Turkey	TKO (corner stoppage)	2	2:35	
2011-04-27	Win	(Belarus) Dmitry Abdullin	IFMA 2011 European Muaythai Championships, 1/4 final (81 kg)	Antalya, Turkey	Decision	4	2:00	
2011-04-25	Win	(Norway) Jokke Siljuberg	IFMA 2011 European Muaythai Championships, 1/8 final (81 kg)	Antalya, Turkey	Decision (5:0) outclassed	4	2:00	
2010-09-02	Win	(Thailand) Yodsaenklai Fairtex	2010 World Combat Games -75 kg Muay Thai, Final	Beijing, China	Decision (3:2)	4	2:00	
Wins SportAccord World Combat Games -75 kg gold medal.
2010-08-31	Win	(Canada) Jesse Lacombe	2010 World Combat Games -75 kg Muay Thai, Semi finals	Beijing, China				
2010-08-29	Win	(Croatia) Emil Zoraj	2010 World Combat Games -75 kg Muay Thai, Quarter finals	Beijing, China	Decision (5:0)	4	2:00	
2010-05-30	Win	(Denmark) Niels Peter Larsen	IFMA 2010 European Muaythai Championships final (75 kg)	Velletri, Italy	TKO (right cross)	1	2:00	
Wins IFMA European Muay Thai Championships 75kg gold medal.
2010-05-29	Win	(Ukraine) Vladimir Artemenko	IFMA 2010 European Muaythai Championships 1/2 final (75 kg)	Velletri, Italy	Decision	4	2:00	
2010-05-27	Win	(Belarus) Dmitry Valent	IFMA 2010 European Muaythai Championships 1/4 final (75 kg)	Velletri, Italy	Decision (5:0)	4	2:00	
2010-05-26	Win	(Croatia) Emil Zoraj	IFMA 2010 European Muaythai Championships 1/8 final(75 kg)	Velletri, Italy	Decision (5:0)	4	2:00	
2009-12-01	Loss	(Croatia) Emil Zoraj	IFMA 2009 World Muaythai Championships 1/4 finals (75 kg)	Bangkok, Thailand	Decision	4	2:00	
2009-11-30	Win	(Thailand) K. Sapchakhorn	IFMA 2009 World Muaythai Championships	Bangkok, Thailand	TKO (referee stoppage)			
2009-05-22	Win	(Ukraine) Ivan Grigoriev	IFMA European Amateur Muaythai championships	Liepāja, Latvia	Decision	4	2:00	
2009-05-20	Win	(Belarus) Dmitry Valent	IFMA European Amateur Muaythai championships	Liepāja, Latvia	Decision	4	2:00	
Wins IFMA European Amateur Muaythai championships (75kg) gold medal
2009-05-19	Win	(Germany) Waldemar Wiebe	IFMA European Amateur Muaythai championships	Liepāja, Latvia	Decision (5:0) outclassed	4	2:00	
2008-10-03	Win	(Belgium) Jan de Kayzer	4th Busan TAFISA World Games	Busan, Korea	Decision	4	2:00	
Wins 4th Busan TAFISA World Games 75kg gold medal.
2008-09-30	Win	(Morocco) Tarik Slimani	4th Busan TAFISA World Games	Busan, Korea	Decision	4	2:00	
2008-09-28	Win	(Ukraine) Ivan Grigoriev	4th Busan TAFISA World Games	Busan, Korea	Decision	4	2:00	
2008-09-27	Win	(Slovenia) Oman Matevz	4th Busan TAFISA World Games	Busan, Korea	TKO (referee stoppage)	1		
2007-12-05	Win	(Belarus) Yuri Gorbachov	WMC IFMA World Muaythai Championships	Bangkok, Thailand	Decision	4	2:00	
Wins WMC IFMA World Muay Thai Championships 75kg gold medal.
2007-12-04	Win	(Ukraine) Petr Nakonechnyi	WMC IFMA World Muaythai Championships	Bangkok, Thailand	Decision	4	2:00	
2007-12-03	Win	(Thailand) Amnart Noenhrathok	WMC IFMA World Muaythai Championships	Bangkok, Thailand	Decision	4	2:00	
2007-11-29	Win	(Austria) Ahmet Labinot	WMC IFMA World Muaythai Championships	Bangkok, Thailand	TKO (referee stoppage)	2		
2007-06-28	Win	(Turkey) Serhat Sener	Muaythai Russia vs Turkey	Moscow, Russia	DEC			
2006-06-07	Win	(Ukraine) Petr Nakonechnyi	WMC IFMA World Muaythai Championships finals	Bangkok, Thailand				
Wins WMC IFMA World Muaythai Championships 75kg gold medal.
2006-06-06	Win	(Belarus) Yuri Gorbachov	WMC IFMA World Muaythai Championships 1/2 finals	Bangkok, Thailand				
2006-06-05	Win	(France) Cheick Sidibé	WMC IFMA World Muaythai Championships 1/4 finals	Bangkok, Thailand				
2006-06-02	Win	(Thailand) Dam Sricham	WMC IFMA World Muaythai Championships 1/8 finals	Bangkok, Thailand				
2006-03-26	Win	(France) Jonathan Camara	WMF World Muaythai Championships finals	Bangkok, Thailand				
Wins WMF World Muaythai Championships 75kg gold medal.
2006-03-24	Win	(Croatia) Spirk Srdan	WMF World Muaythai Championships 1/2 finals	Bangkok, Thailand				
2005-05-00	Win	(Russia) Elgam Arabalaev	Russian Muaythai Championships finals	Arzamas, Russia	Decision (5:0)	4	2:00	
Wins Russian Muaythai Championships 75kg gold medal.
2005-05-00	Win	(Russia) Alexander Vitkin	Russian Muaythai Championships	Arzamas, Russia	KO			
2005-03-26	Win	(Turkey)	WMF World Muaythai Championships finals	Bangkok, Thailand	Decision (5:0)	4	2:00	
Wins WMF World Muaythai Championships 67kg gold medal.
2005-03-24	Win	(Thailand) Rachamom Sarakhamom	WMF World Muaythai Championships 1/2 finals	Bangkok, Thailand	Decision (5:0)	4	2:00	
2005-03-19	Win	(Lebanon) Ali Soueda	WMF World Muaythai Championships 1/4 finals	Bangkok, Thailand	Decision	4	2:00	
2005-03-17	Win	(Czech Republic) Adam Pengsavang	WMF World Muaythai Championships 1/8 finals	Bangkok, Thailand	Decision	4	2:00	
Legend: Win Loss Draw/no contest Notes

== Boxing record ==
Boxing record
1 win (1 (T)KOs, 0 decisions), 0 losses
Date	Result	Opponent	Event	Location	Method	Round	Time	Record
2008-02-23	Win	(Russia) Vladimir Chuklin	TITOV/RCC BOXING PROMOTIONS	Kemerovo, Russia	TKO	2	2:56	1-0
Legend: Win Loss Draw/no contest Notes

== See also ==
- List of K-1 events
- List of It's Showtime champions
- List of male kickboxers
