= Chaz Mulkey =

American Muay Thai kickboxer (born 1981)

- Born: Chaz Pictro Mulkey; February 4, 1981 (age 45); Dallas, Texas, United States
- Other names: No Mercy
- Nationality: (United States) American
- Height: 6 ft 1 in (1.85 m)
- Weight: 154 lb (70 kg; 11.0 st)
- Division: Middleweight; Super Middleweight
- Style: Muay Thai
- Stance: Orthodox
- Fighting out of: Las Vegas, Nevada, United States
- Team: Janjira Muay Thai; Syndicate MMA; Combat Sports Academy
- Trainer: Master Lookchang
- Years active: 2009-present

Kickboxing record
- Total: 15
- Wins: 9
- Losses: 6
- Draws: 0
- Last updated on: September 8, 2012

Chaz Pictro Mulkey (born February 4, 1981) is an American Muay Thai kickboxer who competes in the middleweight and super middleweight divisions. He defeated Remy Bonnel to win the WBC Muaythai International Middleweight (-72 kg/160 lb) Championship in 2011.

== Career ==
Mulkey began practicing Muay Thai in his 20s under Saekson Janjira at Janjira Muay Thai in Dallas, Texas. After training there for six months, he moved to Las Vegas, Nevada. He turned professional in 2009 after an undefeated amateur career.

On August 28, 2010, Mulkey lost via unanimous decision to Remy Bonnel in Primm, Nevada. He then lost to Joe Schilling by second round technical knockout in Los Angeles, California on December 5, 2012 in a WBC Muaythai US Super Muddleweight (-76 kg/168 lb) title eliminator.

He snapped a two-fight losing streak by defeating Douglas Edwards by TKO in round two in a rematch in Primm, Nevada on February 12, 2011. This was followed up with two back-to-back wins in the space of a month in May 2011 when he beat Ken Tran by unanimous decision in Primm and Phillip Sidkrunoom by TKO due to low kicks in Thailand.

This earned him a shot at the WBC Muaythai International Middleweight (-72 kg/160 lb) Championship against familiar opponent Remy Bonnel on August 20, 2011. After a close fight, Mulkey was decided the victor by split decision to become the new champion. He made the first defence of his title against Simon Chu in Las Vegas on November 19, 2011, taking a unanimous decision over the Englishman.

He then went up against Gregory Choplin in Las Vegas on May 14, 2012. Choplin floored Mulkey and utilised powerful low kicks en route to a unanimous decision which ended Mulkey's five-fight win-streak.

He was slated to face Saiyok Pumpanmuang at Thai Fight: Pattaya in Pattaya, Thailand on April 17, 2012 but instead faced Bernueng TopKing Boxing and lost a decision after three rounds.

In March 2012, it was reported that Mulkey had signed with Glory, one of the world's premier kickboxing organizations, to compete in the 2012 Middleweight Slam tournament. He was replaced by Michael Chase Corley, however, as America's second representative alongside Ky Hollenbeck. He joined K-1 instead and debuted against Kit Cope at the K-1 World Grand Prix 2012 in Los Angeles on September 8, 2012. Cope injured himself while attempting a spinning kick in round two, and Mulkey was able to knock him down three time by attacking his injured leg, which caused the referee to stop the bout and announce Mulkey as the winner by TKO.

== Championships and awards ==
=== Kickboxing ===
- World Boxing Council Muaythai
  - WBC Muaythai International Middleweight (-72 kg/160 lb) Championship

== Kickboxing record ==
Kickboxing record
9 wins, 6 losses, 0 draws
Date	Result	Opponent	Event	Location	Method	Round	Time	Record
2012-09-08	Win	(United States) Kit Cope	K-1 World Grand Prix 2012 in Los Angeles	Los Angeles, California, US	TKO (referee stoppage)	2	2:16	9-6
2012-04-17	Loss	(Thailand) Bernueng TopKing Boxing	Thai Fight: Pattaya	Pattaya, Thailand	Decision	3	5:00	8-6
2012-05-14	Loss	(France) Gregory Choplin	Battle in the Desert 5	Las Vegas, Nevada, US	Decision (unanimous)	5	5:00	8-5
2011-11-19	Win	(England) Simon Chu	Battle in the Desert 4	Las Vegas, Nevada, US	Decision (unanimous)	5	3:00	8-4
Defends the WBC Muaythai International Middleweight (-72kg/160lb) Championship.
2011-08-20	Win	(France) Remy Bonnel	Battle in the Desert 3	Primm, Nevada, US	Decision (split)	5	3:00	7-4
Wins the WBC Muaythai International Middleweight (-72kg/160lb) Championship.
2011-05-00	Win	(Germany) Phillip Sidkrunoom		Thailand	TKO (low kicks)	2		6-4
2011-05-14	Win	(Canada) Ken Tran	Battle in the Desert 2	Primm, Nevada, US	Decision (unanimous)	5	3:00	5-4
2011-02-12	Win	(United States) Douglas Edwards	Battle in the Desert 1	Primm, Nevada, US	TKO (knee)	2	2:41	4-4
2010-12-05	Loss	(United States) Joe Schilling	The Kings Birthday Celebration	Los Angeles, California, US	TKO (referee stoppage)	2	1:06	3-4
2010-08-28	Loss	(France) Remy Bonnel	WCK Muay Thai	Primm, Nevada, US	Decision (unanimous)	5	3:00	3-3
2010-04-30	Win	(Netherlands) Menno Dijkstra	WCK Muay Thai	Primm, Nevada, US	Decision (unanimous)	5	3:00	3-2
2009-12-05	Win	(United States) Bryce Krauss	WCK Muay Thai	Las Vegas, Nevada, US	KO	1	1:07	2-2
2009-08-30	Loss	(United States) Chike Lindsay		Las Vegas, Nevada, US	Decision (majority)	5	3:00	1-2
2009-06-13	Loss	(Brazil) Marfio Canoletti	War of the Heroes III	Santa Clara, California, US	TKO (cut)	5	0:52	1-1
	Win	(United States) Douglas Edwards						1-0
Legend: Win Loss Draw/No contest Notes
