= Steve Wakeling =

English Middleweight Muay Thai kickboxer (b.1983)

Stephen Wakeling
- Born: Stephen Wakeling; 4 October 1983 (age 43); York, England
- Nationality: English
- Height: 1.85 m (6 ft 1 in)
- Weight: 84 kg (185 lb; 13.2 st)
- Division: Middleweight
- Style: Muay Thai
- Fighting out of: Beckenham, England
- Team: Scorpions Gym
- Trainer: Mark Wakeling
- Years active: 2000–present

Kickboxing record
- Total: 41
- Wins: 37
- By knockout: 15
- Losses: 4
- By knockout: 1

Other information
- Notable relatives: Michael Wakeling, brother
- Last updated on: 23 March 2013

Stephen Wakeling (born 4 October 1983) is an English Middleweight Muay Thai kickboxer, fighting out of Kent, England. He is former British, European and four time World Muay Thai champion.

== Early life ==
Wakeling's parents were both Muay Thai fighters, his father competed in the famed King's Cup in Thailand.

== Biography and career ==
He was expected to face Joe Schilling at Glory 5: London in London, England on 23 March 2013 but his opponent was changed to Simon Marcus. Marcus then withdrew from the bout to face Artem Levin, however, and Eddie Walker stepped in as his third opponent. He stopped Walker with low kicks in round two.

He was set to compete in the four man 85 kg/187 lb tournament at Glory 10: Los Angeles - Middleweight World Championship Tournament in Ontario, California, United States on 28 September 2013 and face Joe Schilling in the semi-finals. However, he was unable to compete due to visa issues and was replaced by Kengo Shimizu.

On the 15th of October 2022 Steve was added to the WBC Muay Thai Hall of Fame.

== Titles ==
- 2011 WBC Muay Thai Super Middleweight World champion
- 2008 WMC M.A.D. World champion
- 2007 WKA Tournament World Middleweight Champion
- 2006 WBC Muay Thai Middleweight World champion
- 2005 S-1 Tournament World champion
- 2004 IMKO World champion
- 2003 WMC Muay Thai World champion
- 2003 WAKO-PRO World title (68 kg)
- 2002 IKF Super Welterweight European Champion
- 2001 British champion

== Fight record ==
Kickboxing record
37 wins (15 KOs), 4 losses, 1 draw
Date	Result	Opponent	Event	Location	Method	Round	Time
2017-9-22	Loss	(France) Cheick Sidibé	Phoenix 3 London	London, United Kingdom	TKO	4	3:00
2013-03-23	Win	(United States) Eddie Walker	Glory 5: London	London, England	KO	2	
2012-07-07	Draw	(Russia) Artem Levin	Xplosion Muay Thai	England	Draw	5	3:00
2011-01-08	Win	(Thailand) Jaochalam Chatkranokgym	The Champions Club 6	Pattaya, Thailand	TKO (Knee)	4	
Wins the WBC Muay Thai World Super Middleweight title.
2008-08-16	Win	(Thailand) Diesellek TopkingBoxing	Muaythai Legends - England vs Thailand	London, UK	Decision	5	3:00
2007-12-08	Win	(France) Yohan Lidon	Steko's Fight Night Final	Munich, Germany	Decision (Split)	4	3:00
2007-12-08	Win	(Portugal) Luis Reis	Steko's Fight Night Semi Final	Munich, Germany	Decision	3	3:00
2007-12-08	Win	(France) Odjeh Manda	Steko's Fight Night Quarter Final	Munich, Germany	KO	1	
2007-09-15	Win	(Belgium) Jan De Keyser	Steko's Fight Night, Final	Munich, Germany			
2007-09-15	Win	(France) Yohan Lidon	Steko's Fight Night, Semi Final	Munich, Germany	TKO(Doctor Stoppage)	2	
2007-02-25	Loss	(Thailand) Lamsongkram Chuwattana	Thunder & Lightning 10	London, England	Decision	5	3:00
Loses the WBC Muay Thai World 160lbs title.
2006-08-19	Win	(Thailand) Jomhod Kiatadisak	Muaythai Legends - England vs Thailand	London, UK	Decision	5	3:00
2006-03-12	Win	(Australia) John Wayne Parr	WBC Muay Thai Championships	London, England, UK	Decision (Split)	5	3:00
Wins the 1st WBC Muay Thai World 160lbs title.
2005-08-12	Win	(Thailand) Pairot Wor.Wolapon	S-1 World Championship, Final	Bangkok, Thailand	KO (Knee to the head)	3	
Wins the 2005 S-1 World Championship -72kg title.
2005-08-12	Win	(Russia) Arslan Magomedov	S-1 World Championship, Semi Final	Bangkok, Thailand	Decision	3	3:00
2005-08-12	Win	(Belarus) Sergey Makogonov	S-1 World Championship, Quarter Final	Bangkok, Thailand	Decision	3	3:00
2004-11-14	Win	(France) Abdoul Toure	Last Man Standing	London, England, UK	TKO (Doctor Stoppage)		
2004-10-02	Win	(France) Aree Nadir	Muay Thai Warriors 3	Crawley, England, UK	TKO	1	
Wins the IMKO World title.
2003-06-22	Loss	(United Kingdom) Kevin Harper	Now is the Time of Combat	London, England, UK	TKO (Injury)	1	
Loses WAKO Pro Muay Thai World title.
2003-02-17	Win	(Thailand) Yingyai Jaothaleethong		London, England, UK	Decision (Split)	5	3:00
Wins the WMC World 147lbs title.
2002-	Win	(United Kingdom) Kevin Harper		England, UK	TKO (Doctor Stoppage)		
2002-08-18	Win	(United Kingdom) Junior Herbert		Reading, England, UK	Decision (Unanimous)	5	3:00
Wins the IKF Pro Muay Thai European Super Welterweight title.
Legend: Win Loss Draw/No contest Notes

== See also ==
- List of male kickboxers
