= Simon Marcus =

Canadian kickboxer (born 1986)

- Born: 5 November 1986 (age 40); Toronto, Ontario, Canada
- Other names: Bad Bwoy; The One
- Height: 1.83 m (6 ft 0 in)
- Weight: 92 kg (203 lb; 14.5 st)
- Division: Light heavyweight Cruiserweight; Middleweight
- Reach: 76.5 in (194 cm)
- Style: Muay Thai
- Stance: Orthodox
- Team: The One Muay Thai
- Trainer: Kru Howard Wright
- Years active: 2021–present (MMA); 2006–2021 (Kickboxing)

Kickboxing record
- Total: 56
- Wins: 49
- By knockout: 27
- Losses: 5
- By knockout: 3
- Draws: 2

Mixed martial arts record
- Total: 4
- Wins: 3
- By knockout: 1
- By decision: 2
- Losses: 1
- By knockout: 1

Amateur record
- Total: 23
- Wins: 19
- By knockout: 5
- Losses: 2
- Draws: 2

Other information
- Mixed martial arts record from Sherdog
- Last updated on: 17 December 2021

Simon Marcus (born 5 November 1986), also known as The One, is a Canadian mixed martial artist and former Muay Thai kickboxer, who competes in the Light Heavyweight and Cruiserweight divisions. He is currently signed with Unified MMA. He was formerly signed with Glory, where he was the former two-time Glory Middleweight champion. In 2012, he beat Kaoklai Kaennorsing for the WPMF World Light Heavyweight title and defeated Joe Schilling twice. He has also defeated Jason Wilnis three times in notable rivalries. Marcus also holds a win over former two-time UFC Middleweight Champion Israel Adesanya. Marcus was ranked as a Top 10 middleweight by Combat Press between September 2014 and July 2021.

== Early life ==
Marcus, a Jamaican Canadian, was a troublesome child but excelled in sports. He was charged with assault and expelled from school for fighting at the age of fifteen. After moving to a new school, he discovered Ajahn Suchart Yodkerepauprai's Siam No.1 Muay Thai gym nearby and promptly began training there. He would then give up on Muay Thai for two years, however, as he pursued basketball and served three months in a youth detention center. Upon being released from detainment, he returned to the gym with the goal of making it as a professional fighter.

== Kickboxing career ==
=== Amateur career ===
Marcus took up Muay Thai at sixteen and achieved success as an amateur initially by medaling at three international tournaments as well as capturing the North American Cruiserweight Championship. He began his amateur career in 2006 and came to prominence by taking a gold medal at the 2007 IFMA World Championships at −81 kg/178 lb before finishing runner-up the following year. In 2009, he became the WKA Amateur North American Cruiserweight (−86 kg/189 lb) Champion, and defeated Artem Vakhitov in the finals of the World Combat Games 2010 −81 kg/178 lb Muaythai division to claim gold there.

=== Turning professional ===
Marcus turned professional in 2007 and Was obtaining pro and amateur careers at the same time up until 2011. He won his first pro titles in Thailand the following year by claiming the Thaphae Stadium Light Heavyweight belt and the Northern Thailand Cruiserweight strap. 2010 also saw his take notable wins over Filip Verlinden, Kun Khmer legend Eh Phoutong and Japanese Kyokushin stylist Ryuta Noji. He ended the year with a first round knockout of Chinese sanshou fighter Guo Hang Hang in Foshan, China. Guo and Marcus then rematched at the Wushu vs. Muaythai event at the Hefei Olympic Sports Center Stadium in Hefei, China on 11 June 2011 where Marcus once again came out on top, winning on points after battering Guo with low kicks throughout the fight.

In 2011, Marcus was scheduled to face former Rajadamnern Stadium champion Kaoklai Kaennorsing in Anaheim, California, United States, but the bout fell through. He would then sign with the short-lived Muaythai Premier League, and debuted with a unanimous decision win over familiar foe Artem Vakhitov at the Muaythai Premier League: Round 1 in Long Beach, California, United States, on 2 September 2011. Another big fight then fell through for Marcus as he was expected to go up against L'houcine "Aussie" Ouzgni at the Muaythai Premier League: Round 3 in the Hague, Netherlands on 6 November 2011 but Ouzgni pulled out on short notice.

=== Joe Schilling rivalry ===
In 2012, he entered the top ten in the world rankings for the first time in his career, coming in at #9. On 25 February 2012, Simon Marcus and Joe Schilling went head to head in a bout to determine North America's top light heavyweight at Lion Fight Promotions: Battle in the Desert 5 in Las Vegas, Nevada. Both men agreed to a "winner takes all" scenario, meaning that whoever came out victorious would take 100% of the fight purse, and the fight ended as controversially as it began. In round one, Marcus tripped Schilling, sending his head slamming into the canvas. As Schilling returned to his feet, clearly hurt from the throw, Marcus stormed in and knocked him down with a left hook. He was able to beat the count but Marcus went on the attack again and knocked Schilling out with a right elbow soon after. Following the fight, Schilling's camp made the accusation that the sweep that Marcus used to daze him initially was illegal and appealed to the Nevada State Athletic Commission to have the bout result overturned to a no contest, which was rejected.

In 2012, he earned his first world title shot and his long-awaited fight with Kaoklai Kaennorsing was set for 16 March in Bangkok, Thailand, with the vacant WPMF World Light Heavyweight (−79 kg/175 lb) Championship also on the line. Marcus dominated the action over five rounds, and walked away with the unanimous decision victory and his first world title at professional level.

On 21 April 2012, Marcus defeated two opponents the same night at the Qianjiang World Muay Thai King Challenge in Beijing, China. He first knocked out Green Spangler before beating Li Shuai via decision in his second fight.

Due to the controversy surrounding the ending of their first fight, Marcus and Joe Schilling rematched at Lion Fight Muay Thai VI in Las Vegas on 12 May 2012 in a WBC Muaythai World Light Heavyweight (−79 kg/175 lb) title eliminator. It was close this time, with both men exchanging menacing shots. Marcus' knees and throws from the clinch would be the deciding factor, however, as he was awarded the majority decision (47-47, 48–47, 49–46).

=== Marcus vs. Levin ===
Marcus moved up to #6 in the world rankings and was expected to face Artem Levin, widely considered the world's best light heavyweight kickfighter, for the Russian's WBC Muaythai World Light Heavyweight strap at Battle for the Belts in Bangkok on 9 June 2012. However, Marcus withdrew from the bout for unknown reasons and was replaced by Joe Schilling. Levin would then also withdraw.

Levin vs. Marcus was then pencilled in for The Battle of Champions 7: School vs. School event at the Luzhniki Stadium in Moscow, Russia, for the vacant WMC World Light Heavyweight (−79 kg/175 lb) title on 16 November 2012 but the event was cancelled.

He instead returned to action with a third round elbow KO of Sweden's Sadibou Sy at Muay Thai in America: In Honor of the King in Los Angeles, California, on 1 December 2012 to end the year with a perfect 6–0 record.

Marcus once again beat two opponents in one night on 10 January 2013 when he knocked out both Arthit Hanchana and Wang Anying at the Foshan China vs. Thailand event in Foshan.

The highly anticipated fight between Simon Marcus and Artem Levin was scheduled for the third time and set for 21 December 2012 in Ekaterinburg, Russia, and then 23 February 2013, before eventually settling on 15 March 2013 at Lion Fight 9 in Las Vegas with the inaugural Lion Fight Light Heavyweight Championship on the line. Although a closely contested bout, it was Marcus' clinching skills that once again made the difference as he took the unanimous decision win and establish himself as world #1.

He had been expected to face Steven Wakeling under Oriental rules at Glory 5: London on 23 March 2013 in London, England, but he was replaced by Eddie Walker in that fight in due to the Levin match coming just a week before.

He was expected to rematch Artem Levin in a fight for the WMC World Super-Light Heavyweight (-82.5 kg/182 lb) Championship at Monte Carlo Fighting Masters 2014 in Monte Carlo, Monaco, on 14 June 2014. The bout was cancelled, however, in order for fighters to compete at Glory 17: Los Angeles which was held a week later.

=== Fighting in China ===
On 27 April 2013, in a close fight, Marcus defeated Dmitry Valent by split decision at C3: King of Fighters in Chengdu, China. He was initially set to rematch Kaoklai Kaennorsing at Muaythai Superfight on 13 May 2013 but the event was moved back to 14 June 2013 and Kaoklai was replaced by Suriya Prasathinphimai. He defeated Suriya by unanimous decision to retain his WPMF belt.

He fought to a controversial majority draw with Chidi Njokuani on the Push Kick Promotions: Muay Thai World Stand Off 5 card in Las Vegas on 29 September 2013. Njokuani started the fight well, using footwork to control the ring, but Marcus soon got inside and began landing knees and elbows from the clinch. In round two, Njokuani was twice given time to recover from illegal strikes, an elbow to the back of the head and a low blow. Each time the fight continued, Marcus would begin to again work in the clinch and Njokuani repeatedly turned his back, so the referee decided to break the fighters continually. Marcus was docked a point by referee Tony Weeks for landing a second low blow in round three and the fight turned into a brawl towards the end. When it went to the judges, the bout was declared a majority draw with two judges scoring the bout a draw and one scoring the bout for Njokuani. Simon Marcus then took to the microphone, calling Chidi Njokuani a "bitch" for his unwillingness to fight in the clinch and questioning the judges knowledge of the Muay Thai scoring system. These post-fight comments led to a heated confrontation between Marcus and Chidi's brother Anthony as they scuffled back stage. On 25 October 2013 outpointed Jiang Chunpeng in Foshan.

Simon Marcus utilized elbows and knees heavily as he outpointed Damian Bujan en route to a split decision win at Ultra Elite Fighters V: Argentina vs. The World in Buenos Aires, Argentina, on 15 December 2013 in a fight where the referee was often quick to break up the clinch. The match was also briefly halted during the fifth round after both fighters fell through the ropes.

He was expected to fight Shifu Yanzi at Hero Legends in Jinan, China, on 3 December 2014. Shifu was replaced by Li Bei, however, and Marcus defeated him by TKO in round one, scoring two official knockdowns.

Marcus won the -80 kg/176 lb tournament at Wu Ling Feng: Kunlun Fight 2 in Zhengzhou, China, on 16 February 2014. His semi-final match with Israel Adesanya was scored a draw after the regulation three rounds and so it went into an extension round to decide the victor, after which Marcus was given the nod by the judges. He then stopped Vehas TopKing with a knee to the body just over two minutes into the first round in the final.

=== Glory ===
It was announced during the Glory 15: Istanbul broadcast that Marcus would be one of eight fighters competing in the Glory 17: Los Angeles - Last Man Standing middleweight (-84.8 kg/187 lb) tournament in Inglewood, California, US, on 21 June 2014. He drew Joe Schilling for the third time in the quarter-finals and floored his American rival with a flurry of punches in round two. He outworked Schilling for all three rounds however, the judges scored the match a unanimous draw to send it into an extension round to decide the winner. Marcus was docked a point by referee "Big" John McCarthy for dropping his mouthpiece numerous times and, now forced to go for the knockout, was caught by a counter right cross from Schilling in the last twenty seconds of the fight which left him unconscious on the mat and with the first loss of his professional career.

At Glory 21: San Diego Marcus faced Artem Levin for the Glory Middleweight Title, in a closely contested bout, the result ended in a controversial draw. The two of them fought a rematch at Glory 27: Chicago. Marcus won the fight by DQ, after Levin decided to leave the ring mid-fight, due to the actions of the referee. One reporter claimed it was "one of the greatest embarrassments in the history of Glory, if not in the history of kickboxing."

In his first title defense, Marcus faced Dustin Jacoby at Glory 34: Denver. He won the fight by TKO, breaking Jacoby's arm with a kick. In his second title defense, he fought a rematch with Jason Wilnis. Wilnis won the fight by a third-round TKO.

Two months later, after scoring TKO wins over Wang Shaohua at Wu Fight and Dustin Jacoby, he was scheduled to fight a rematch with Jason Wilnis at Glory 40: Copenhagen. He defeated Wilnis by split decision. For the first title defense of his second reign, Marcus was scheduled to fight Alex Pereira at Glory 46: China. Pereira won the fight by unanimous decision.

In the first fight, post-title loss, Marcus fought Zack Wells at Glory 52: Los Angeles. The fight ended after 63 seconds, with Marcus winning by TKO. At Glory 56: Denver, he Jason Wilnis for the fourth time, winning by split decision.

Marcus challenged for the Glory Middleweight title for the third time in his career at Glory 58: Chicago, when he fought a rematch with Alex Pereira. The rematch ended in the same manner as their first fight, with Pereira winning by unanimous decision.

== Mixed martial arts ==
Simon made his long-awaited professional MMA debut on 17 December 2021, against Anton Tokarchuk in Unified MMA 42, a top Canadian MMA promotion. He won the bout via technical unanimous decision after Tokarchuk was unable to continue due to eye poke.

Marcus was next scheduled to face Dylan Schellenberg at United MMA 43 on 4 March 2022. However the bout was scrapped when Schellenberg was forced to pull out for an undisclosed reason.

== Championships and awards ==
=== Kickboxing ===
- Glory
  - 2017 Glory Middleweight (-85 kg/187.4 lb) Championship
  - 2015 Glory Middleweight (-85 kg/187.4 lb) Championship (One defense)
  - 2015 Glory Middleweight (-85 kg/187.4 lb) Contender Tournament Winner
- World Boxing Council Muaythai
  - WBC Muaythai Light Heavyweight (−79 kg/175 lb) Championship
- World Championship Kickboxing Muay Thai
  - WCK Muay Thai World Light Heavyweight (−79 kg/175 lb) Championship
- International Federation of Muaythai Amateur
  - 2007 IFMA World Championships −81 kg/178 lb gold medalist (gold)
  - 2008 IFMA World Championships −81 kg/178 lb silver medalist (silver)
- Lion Fight
  - Lion Fight Light Heavyweight (−79 kg/175 lb) Championship
- Muay Thai Authority.com
  - 2012 North American Male Fighter of the Year
  - 2013 North American Male Fighter of the Year
- SportAccord World Combat Games
  - World Combat Games 2010 −81 kg/178 lb Muaythai Gold Medalist (gold)
- Thaphae Stadium
  - Northern Thailand Cruiserweight Championship
  - Thaphae Stadium Light Heavyweight Championship
- World Kickboxing Association
  - WKA Amateur North American Cruiserweight (−86 kg/189 lb) Championship
- World Muaythai Council
  - WMC Open Chinese Championships Winner
- World Professional Muaythai Federation
  - WPMF World Light Heavyweight (−79 kg/175 lb) Championship
- World League of Fighting
  - WLF: Kunlun Fight 2 –80 kg/176 lb Tournament Championship
  - WLF: Kunlun Fight 12 –80 kg/176 lb Tournament Championship
- International Professional Combat Council
  - IPPC World Light Heavyweight (−80 kg/176 lb) Championship
- Combat Banchemek
  - Combat Banchemek World Light Heavyweight (−80 kg/176 lb) Championship

== Mixed martial arts record ==
Professional record breakdown
| 4 matches | 3 wins | 1 loss |
| By knockout | 1 | 1 |
| By decision | 2 | 0 |

| Res. | Record | Opponent | Method | Event | Date | Round | Time | Location | Notes |
|---|---|---|---|---|---|---|---|---|---|
| Loss | 3–1 | Bobby Poulter | TKO (elbows) | Unified MMA 66 | February 20, 2026 | 3 | 4:05 | Toronto, Ontario, Canada | Welterweight debut. For the vacant Unified MMA Welterweight Championship. |
| Win | 3–0 | Ricardo Chávez Villaseñor | TKO (punches) | Unified MMA 63 | 26 September 2025 | 2 | 4:35 | Toronto, Ontario, Canada | |
| Win | 2–0 | Grady Behrens | Decision (unanimous) | Unified MMA 57 | 14 June 2024 | 3 | 5:00 | Toronto, Ontario, Canada | Middleweight debut. |
| Win | 1–0 | Anton Tokarchuk | Technical Decision (unanimous) | Unified MMA 42 | 17 December 2021 | 3 | 1:02 | Edmonton, Alberta, Canada | Catchweight (195 lb) bout. Accidental eye poke rendered Tokarchuk unable to continue. |

== Kickboxing and Muay Thai record ==
Kickboxing record
49 wins (27 KOs), 5 losses, 2 draws
| Date | Result | Opponent | Event | Location | Method | Round | Time |
| 2018-09-14 | Loss | (Brazil) Alex Pereira | Glory 58: Chicago | Chicago, United States | Decision (unanimous) | 5 | 3:00 |
For The Glory Middleweight Championship.
| 2018-08-10 | Win | (Netherlands) Jason Wilnis | Glory 56: Denver | Colorado | Decision (Split) | 3 | 3:00 |
| 2018-03-31 | Win | (United States) Zack Wells | Glory 52: Los Angeles | Los Angeles, United States | TKO (Referee Stoppage/ Punches) | 1 | 1:03 |
| 2017-10-14 | Loss | (Brazil) Alex Pereira | Glory 46: China | Guangzhou, China | Decision (unanimous) | 5 | 3:00 |
Loses the Glory Middleweight Championship.
| 2017-04-29 | Win | (Netherlands) Jason Wilnis | Glory 40: Copenhagen | Copenhagen, Denmark | Decision (split) | 5 | 3:00 |
Wins the Glory Middleweight Championship.
| 2016-12-23 | Win | (China) Wang Shaohua | Wu Fight | Foshan, China | TKO (Injury) | 1 | |
| 2016-10-21 | Win | (United States) Dustin Jacoby | Glory 34: Denver | Broomfield, Colorado, US | TKO (injury) | 2 | 0:01 |
| 2016-09-09 | Loss | (Netherlands) Jason Wilnis | Glory 33: New Jersey | Trenton, New Jersey, US | TKO (referee stoppage) | 3 | 1:14 |
Loses the Glory Middleweight Championship.
| 2016-05-13 | Win | (United States) Dustin Jacoby | Glory 30: Los Angeles | Ontario, California, US | Decision (unanimous) | 5 | 3:00 |
Retains the Glory Middleweight Championship.
| 2016-02-26 | Win | (Russia) Artem Levin | Glory 27: Chicago | Hoffman Estates, Illinois, US | DQ (forfeit) | 3 | 2:55 |
Wins the Glory Middleweight Championship.
| 2015-05-08 | Draw | (Russia) Artem Levin | Glory 21: San Diego | San Diego, California, US | Decision (majority) | 5 | 3:00 |
For the Glory Middleweight Championship.
| 2015-04-03 | Win | (Netherlands) Jason Wilnis | Glory 20: Dubai - Middleweight Contender Tournament, Final | Dubai, UAE | Decision (split) | 3 | 3:00 |
Wins the Glory Middleweight Contender Tournament.
| 2015-04-03 | Win | (United States) Wayne Barrett | Glory 20: Dubai - Middleweight Contender Tournament, Semi Finals | Dubai, UAE | Decision (unanimous) | 3 | 3:00 |
| 2015-01-31 | Loss | (China) Fang Bian | Wu Lin Feng World Championship 2015 | Chongqing, China | TKO (referee stoppage) | 2 | |
| 2014-10-26 | Win | (Belarus) Dmitry Valent | Kunlun Fight 12 | Jianshui, China | Decision | 5 | 3:00 |
Wins the Kunlun Fight Tournament, Combat Banchmek, IPCC Light Heavyweight (−80 kg/176 lb) Championship.
| 2014-06-21 | Loss | (United States) Joe Schilling | Glory 17: Los Angeles - Middleweight Last Man Standing Tournament, Quarter Finals | Inglewood, California, US | KO (right cross) | 4 | 2:41 |
| 2014-02-16 | Win | (Thailand) Wehaj Kingboxing | Kunlun Fight 2, Finals | Zhengzhou, China | KO (knee to the body) | 1 | 2:28 |
Wins KLF -80 kg/176 lb Tournament Championship.
| 2014-02-16 | Win | (Nigeria) Israel Adesanya | Kunlun Fight 2, Semi Finals | Zhengzhou, China | Ext.R decision | 4 | 3:00 |
| 2014-01-03 | Win | (China) Li Bei | Hero Legends | Jinan, China | TKO (left jab) | 1 | 2:30 |
| 2013-12-15 | Win | (Argentina) Damian Bujan | Ultra Elite Fighters V: Argentina vs. The World | Buenos Aires, Argentina | Decision (split) | 5 | 3:00 |
| 2013-10-25 | Win | (China) Jiang Chunpeng | Foshan Championships | Foshan, China | Decision | 5 | 3:00 |
| 2013-09-28 | Draw | (United States) Chidi Njokuani | Push Kick Promotions: Muay Thai World Stand Off 5 | Las Vegas, Nevada, US | Decision (majority) | 3 | 3:00 |
| 2013-06-14 | Win | (Thailand) Suriya Prasathinphimai | Muaythai Superfight | Pattaya, Thailand | Decision (unanimous) | 5 | 3:00 |
Retains the WPMF World Light Heavyweight (-79kg/175lb) Championship.
| 2013-05-03 | Win | (Belarus) Dmitry Valent | C3: King of Fighters | Chengdou, China | Decision (split) | 5 | 3:00 |
Wins the WBC Muaythai World Light Heavyweight (-79kg/175lb) Championship and the WCK Muay Thai World Light Heavyweight (-79kg/175lb) Championship.
| 2013-03-15 | Win | (Russia) Artem Levin | Lion Fight 9 | Las Vegas, Nevada, US | Decision (unanimous) | 5 | 3:00 |
Wins the Lion Fight Light Heavyweight (-79kg/175lb) Championship.
| 2013-01-10 | Win | (China) Wang Anying | Foshan China vs. Thailand | Foshan, China | KO (right knee to the body) | 2 | |
| 2013-01-10 | Win | (Thailand) Arthit Hanchana | Foshan China vs. Thailand | Foshan, China | KO (left hook and right cross) | 4 | |
| 2012-12-01 | Win | (Sweden) Sadibou Sy | Muay Thai in America: In Honor of the King | Los Angeles, California, US | KO (left elbow) | 3 | 1:07 |
| 2012-05-12 | Win | (United States) Joe Schilling | Lion Fight Muay Thai VI | Las Vegas, Nevada, US | Decision (majority) | 5 | 3:00 |
| 2012-04-21 | Win | (China) Li Shuai | Qianjiang World Muay Thai King Challenge | Chongqing, China | Decision | 3 | 3:00 |
| 2012-04-21 | Win | (China) Green Spangler | Qianjiang World Muay Thai King Challenge | Chongqing, China | TKO (referee stoppage) | 3 | 1:50 |
| 2012-03-16 | Win | (Thailand) Kaoklai Kaennorsing | Suk Wan Muaythai Naikhanomtom | Bangkok, Thailand | Decision (unanimous) | 5 | 3:00 |
Wins the WPMF World Light Heavyweight (-79kg/175lb) Championship.
| 2012-02-25 | Win | (United States) Joe Schilling | Lion Fight Promotions: Battle in the Desert 5 | Las Vegas, Nevada, US | KO (right elbow) | 1 | 2:50 |
| 2011-09-02 | Win | (Russia) Artem Vakhitov | Muaythai Premier League: Round 1 | Long Beach, California, US | Decision (unanimous) | 5 | 3:00 |
| 2011-06-11 | Win | (China) Guo Hang Hang | Wushu vs. Muaythai | Hefei, China | Decision | 5 | 3:00 |
| 2010-12-18 | Win | (China) Guo Hang Hang | Bruce Lee 70th Birthday Celebration | Foshan, China | KO (left knee to the body) | 1 | |
| 2010-9-25 | Win | (Cambodia) Eh Phoutong | Khmer Boxing CTN | Cambodia | Decision | 5 | 3:00 |
| 2010-03-25 | Win | (Japan) Ryuta Noji | Planet Battle V: Fast & Furious | Wan Chai, Hong Kong | Decision (unanimous) | 3 | 3:00 |
| 2009 | Win | (Belgium) Filip Verlinden | | | | | |
| 2008-11-15 | Win | (United States) Aaron Meisner | Shin Do Kumate XV | Tampa, Florida, US | TKO (doctor stoppage) | 2 | 3:00 |
Legend: Win Loss Draw/No contest Notes

== See also ==
- List of male kickboxers
