= Alex Pereira =

Brazilian kickboxer and mixed martial artist (born 1987)

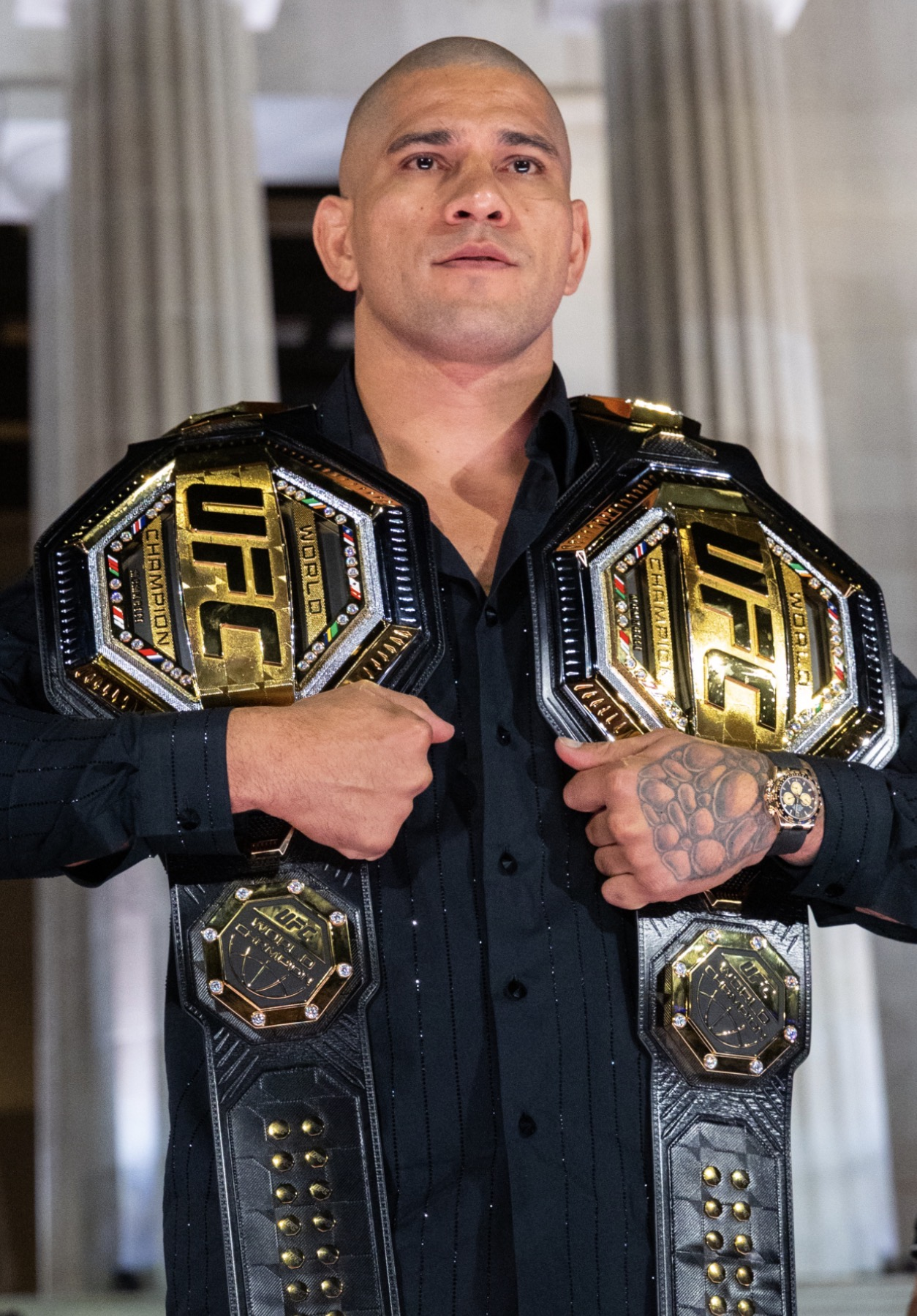
- Pereira in 2026
- Born: Alex Sandro Silva Pereira; 7 July 1987 (age 39); São Bernardo do Campo, São Paulo, Brazil
- Nickname: Poatan
- Height: 6 ft 4 in (193 cm)
- Weight: 251 lb (114 kg; 17 st 13 lb)
- Division: Middleweight (MMA), (Kickboxing) (2015–2016, 2020–2023); Light heavyweight (MMA), (Kickboxing) (2023–2025); Heavyweight (MMA) (2026-present); Cruiserweight (Boxing)
- Reach: 79 in (200 cm)
- Style: Kickboxing
- Stance: Orthodox
- Fighting out of: Danbury, Connecticut, U.S.
- Team: Teixeira MMA & Fitness (2020–present)
- Trainer: Vinicius Reviravolta, Glover Teixeira, Plinio Cruz
- Rank: Black belt in kickboxing Black belt in Brazilian jiu-jitsu under Plinio Cruz; Yellow belt in Judo under Kayla Harrison
- Years active: 2010–2021 (kickboxing); 2015–present (MMA)

Professional boxing record
- Total: 1
- Wins: 1
- By knockout: 1

Kickboxing record
- Total: 40
- Wins: 33
- By knockout: 21
- Losses: 7
- By knockout: 2

Mixed martial arts record
- Total: 17
- Wins: 13
- By knockout: 11
- By decision: 2
- Losses: 4
- By knockout: 2
- By submission: 1
- By decision: 1

Other information
- Notable relatives: Aline Pereira (sister)
- Boxing record from BoxRec
- Mixed martial arts record from Sherdog

YouTube information
- Channel: Alex Poatan Pereira
- Subscribers: 732 thousand
- Views: 84 million
- Last updated: 12 November 2026

Alex Sandro Silva Pereira (born 7 July 1987) is a Brazilian professional mixed martial artist and former professional kickboxer. He currently competes in the Heavyweight division of the Ultimate Fighting Championship (UFC), where he is the former two-time UFC Light Heavyweight Champion and former UFC Middleweight Champion. As of 19 September 2026, he is #3 in the Meta UFC light heavyweight rankings, #4 in the Meta UFC heavyweight rankings and as of 17 November 2026, he is #11 in the UFC men's pound-for-pound rankings.

He is the ninth fighter in UFC history to become champion in two different weight divisions and the first to become champion in both the middleweight and light heavyweight divisions of the organization. In kickboxing, he is a former Glory middleweight and light heavyweight champion, and is the first and only fighter to have held Glory titles in two weight classes simultaneously. Pereira also competed in promotions such as It's Showtime and Superkombat Fighting Championship in kickboxing, and for Jungle Fight and Legacy Fighting Alliance in MMA. Pereira is the only known fighter to be a two-division world champion in MMA and kickboxing and is regarded as one of the greatest combat athletes of all time. Pereira was ranked #1 in the kickboxing middleweight and light-heavyweight rankings in February 2021.

== Early life ==
Growing up in the favela of Batistini in the periphery of São Bernardo do Campo, Pereira dropped out of middle school to begin working with his father as a bricklayer's assistant, later as a shoeshine boy, selling roses, before landing a steady job at a in a tire shop.

Pereira's youth was marked by hardships and family tragedies. His brother Angelo, just over a year older, became involved with drugs and was murdered at the age of 17. Influenced by his colleagues, he began drinking and eventually became an alcoholic, an addiction that, by his own account, began at age 12 and worsened throughout his youth, eventually impairing his professional performance at the tire shop.

In 2009 at 21 years old, he began training kickboxing in order to get rid of his addiction. After several unsuccessful attempts to control his addiction, he stopped drinking alcohol permanently at the end of 2012. Upon joining Master Belocqua Wera's academy, he discovered his natural talent for martial arts.

== Amateur boxing career ==
Before becoming a prominent figure in kickboxing and mixed martial arts, Alex Pereira had a notable amateur boxing career in Brazil. He reportedly competed in 28 amateur boxing matches, achieving a record of 25 wins, all by knockout, with just 3 losses. Pereira's signature power, particularly his devastating left hook, became evident early in his amateur career, as seen in viral footage showcasing multiple knockouts, including an instance where he knocked an opponent out of the ring.

== Kickboxing career ==
In 2012 Alex won the Jungle Fight Middleweight Title, the WGP -85 kg/187 lb Championship and challenged for the It's Showtime 85MAX Championship vs Jason Wilnis losing by TKO in the second round.

In 2013 he won the WAKO Pro Panamerican K-1 -85 kg/187 lb Championship.

In late 2013 he went back to the amateurs to participate in the W.A.K.O. World Championship '13 at -91 kg. He won in the quarter final and the semi final but came up short in the finals vs Sergej Maslobojev earning him a silver medal. Two months later he participated in the WGP tournament and beat Camilo Ferraz in the semi final and fought César Almeida in the finals having previously defeating him in SUPERKOMBAT New Heroes 2, in the finals Alex lost by decision making their rivalry 1-1.

In 2014 he made his Glory debut having won the Glory 14: Zagreb - Middleweight Contender Tournament in Zagreb, Croatia on 8 March 2014, beating Dustin Jacoby by first-round knockout in the semi-finals and Sahak Parparyan by majority decision in the final.

It was announced during the Glory 15: Istanbul broadcast that Pereira would be one of eight fighters competing in the Glory 17: Los Angeles - Last Man Standing middleweight tournament in Inglewood, California, United States on 21 June 2014. He lost to eventual champion Artem Levin by unanimous decision in the quarter-finals to exit the tournament.

He was scheduled to fight a trilogy with César Almeida during WGP Kickboxing 25 for the vacant belt WGP Middleweight Championship. He defeated Almeida by decision. He defended his WGP KB title with a second-round KO of Maycon Silva at WGP KB 40.

In his next five fights, Pereira went on a 4–1 run, losing only to the pound for pound great Artur Kyshenko. During this run Pereira achieved his most famous victories, defeating the future UFC Middleweight champion Israel Adesanya twice: once by unanimous decision, and once by a counter left hook KO.

Pereira participated in the Glory Contender Tournament defeating Burim Rama in the semi finals, losing to Yousri Belgaroui at the Glory 40 in the finale.

=== Glory Middleweight Championship ===
Pereira won the Glory Middleweight title with a unanimous decision win against Simon Marcus at Glory 46: China.

Alex defended the title in a rematch vs Yousri Belgaroui At Glory 49 Superfight Series, and then in 2018 in New York Madison Square Garden at the Glory 55 for the Middleweight Title Match, where Belgaroui had received the overhand right knockout at 2:29 of Round 1. For Pereira, it was the 28th career victory and the sixth inside the Glory ring.

In November 2018, Pereira said he would pursue MMA career after his contract with Glory will expire in April 2019. Eventually, Pereira re-signed with Glory with possibility to fight in the mixed martial arts also.

After four successful Glory middleweight title defenses (against Yousri Belgaroui twice, Simon Marcus and Jason Wilnis), Pereira moved up to fight Donegi Abena for the interim Glory Light Heavyweight Championship at Glory 68. Pereira won the fight via knockout in the third round, becoming the first double champion in Glory history.

After winning the Interim Light Heavyweight Championship, Pereira opted to defend his middleweight title against Ertugrul Bayrak at Glory Collision 2 on 21 December 2019. After largely dominating the first round, he won the bout via knockout at the end of the round.

=== Glory Light Heavyweight Championship ===
Pereira was scheduled to challenge Artem Vakhitov for the Glory Light Heavyweight title at Glory 77. Pereira won the fight by split decision, becoming the first fighter in GLORY history to simultaneously hold two belts at the same time.

Pereira was later stripped of his Middleweight title.

Pereira rematched Artem Vakhitov at Glory 78: Rotterdam in his first title defense. He lost the rematch by majority decision. Pereira was deducted one point in round 4 due to repeated clinching, which was seen by many as a controversial decision by the referee.

== Mixed martial arts career ==
=== Early career ===
Transitioning from kickboxing, Pereira made his professional mixed martial arts debut in 2015 at Jungle Fight 82 against Quemuel Ottoni, losing the fight via submission. He continued at Jungle Fight subsequently racking up two straight victories against Marcelo Cruz and Marcus Vinicius Silveira, with a KO and TKO respectively. Pereira announced he had signed a contract to face Diego Henrique da Silva in the Brazilian edition of Dana White's Contender Series on August 10, 2018. However, the bout never materialized as Glory did not permit Pereira to compete.

On 22 October 2020, news surfaced that Pereira had signed a contract with Legacy Fighting Alliance and he then made his promotional debut against Thomas Powell on 20 November 2020. He won the fight via knockout in round one.

=== Ultimate Fighting Championship ===
On 3 September 2021, Pereira signed with the UFC. He made his promotional debut against Andreas Michailidis on 6 November 2021, at UFC 268. He won the fight via technical knock out in round two. This win earned him a Performance of the Night award.

Pereira faced Bruno Silva on 12 March 2022, at UFC Fight Night 203. Pereira outstruck Silva for all three rounds and won the fight via unanimous decision.

Pereira was scheduled to face Sean Strickland on 30 July 2022, at UFC 277. However, the promotion decided to move the pairing to UFC 276 on 2 July 2022. Pereira won the fight after knocking Strickland out in the first round. This win earned him a Performance of the Night award, and Crypto.com Fan Bonus of the Night third place award which paid in bitcoin of US$10,000.

==== UFC Middleweight Championship ====
Pereira faced Israel Adesanya for the UFC Middleweight Championship on 12 November 2022, at UFC 281. He won the bout via technical knockout in the fifth round. This win earned him the Performance of the Night award.

A rematch between Pereira and Adesanya for the UFC Middleweight Championship took place on 8 April 2023, at UFC 287. He lost the bout via knockout in the final minute of round two.

==== Move to Light Heavyweight ====
Pereira was often noted for his large frame for his weight class and ability to comfortably cut large amounts of weight. According to Pereira, he would weigh about 215 pounds on fight night when fighting as a middleweight (after dehydrating to the 185-pound limit at the weigh-in), and still 225 to 235 pounds as a light heavyweight. For comparison, his longtime rival Israel Adesanya typically weighed 196 pounds on fight night.

On 13 April 2023, Pereira announced via Twitter that he was moving up to the Light Heavyweight division.

Pereira faced former UFC Light Heavyweight champion Jan Błachowicz on 29 July 2023 at UFC 291. He won the back-and-forth fight via split decision. 22 out of 26 media outlets scored the bout for Pereira.

==== UFC Light Heavyweight Championship ====
Pereira faced former UFC Light Heavyweight champion Jiří Procházka for the vacant UFC Light Heavyweight Championship belt on 11 November 2023, at UFC 295. He won the bout via TKO stoppage in the second round to win the title. This fight earned him the Performance of the Night award. This victory made Pereira the 9th fighter in UFC history to become champion in two different weight divisions.

Pereira made his first title defence against former UFC Light Heavyweight champion Jamahal Hill, on 13 April 2024, at UFC 300. He won the fight by knockout in the first round after a left hook.

On two weeks notice, replacing the main event bout between Michael Chandler and Conor McGregor, who was injured, Pereira faced Jiří Procházka in a rematch on 29 June 2024, at UFC 303. After knocking Prochazka down in the last second of the first round with a left hook, he was able to win the bout with a head kick knockdown followed by punches early in the second round. This fight earned him another $50,000 Performance of the Night award. On an interview, Pereira's coach later revealed that Pereira received a $303,000 bonus for his performance at UFC 303.

Pereira made his third title defense against Khalil Rountree Jr. on 5 October 2024 at UFC 307. He won the fight by technical knockout in the fourth round. This fight earned him his first Fight of the Night award. Pereira set the record for the shortest time for three title defenses in the UFC at 175 days, beating the previous record of 189 days by Ronda Rousey, and became the seventh UFC fighter to record three title defenses in a calendar year.

Pereira faced former title challenger Magomed Ankalaev on 8 March 2025 at UFC 313. He lost the title by unanimous decision. 11 out of 21 media outlets scored the bout for Ankalaev.

Pereira competed for the championship against Magomed Ankalaev in a rematch on 4 October 2025 at UFC 320. He reclaimed the championship by technical knockout via punches and elbows in the first round. This fight earned him another Performance of the Night award. Following the fight, Pereira expressed his desire to fight former UFC Heavyweight Champion Jon Jones at the UFC Freedom 250 event, a match-up supported by Jones.

It was announced on 27 February 2026, that Jiří Procházka and Carlos Ulberg would be headlining UFC 327 for the vacant UFC Light Heavyweight Championship resulting in Pereira officially vacating the title.

On 11 April 2026, it was announced that Pereira will be a recipient of the 2026 UFC Forrest Griffin Community Award for his institute "Instituto Poatan" which supports underserved youth in São Paulo, Brazil.

==== Move to Heavyweight ====
Alex trained for the bout in Orlando, Florida at "Fusion X-Cel" gym. Many videos of him taking down larger opponents and hard sparring opponents went viral and brought a lot of anticipation for the Freedom 250 bout.

Pereira attempted to be the first UFC fighter to win titles in three divisions by competing for the interim heavyweight championship against former interim champion Ciryl Gane on 14 June 2026 at UFC Freedom 250. He lost the fight by technical knockout in the second round. Pereira heavily criticized referee Herb Dean, claiming that Dean did not properly enforce the rules against blows to the back of the head, stating that Gane repeatedly elbowed him there during the finishing sequence.

Pereira is scheduled to face Sergei Pavlovich on 12 December 2026, at UFC 335.

== Fighting style ==
Pereira's fighting style is heavily rooted in his kickboxing background, especially from his time as a two-division champion in Glory. He typically maintains a composed stance and applies pressure with deliberate movement, often using low kicks to slow his opponents down and set up power shots. While his pace isn't particularly high, he's extremely efficient—many of his strikes are thrown with knockout intent.

One of his most dangerous weapons is his left hook, which has finished multiple opponents and is often used as a counter when they overextend. Even though he entered MMA with minimal grappling experience, he's shown noticeable progress in takedown defense and clinch work— thanks in large part to training under his coaches Plinio Cruz and former UFC light heavyweight champion Glover Teixeira.

== Personal life ==
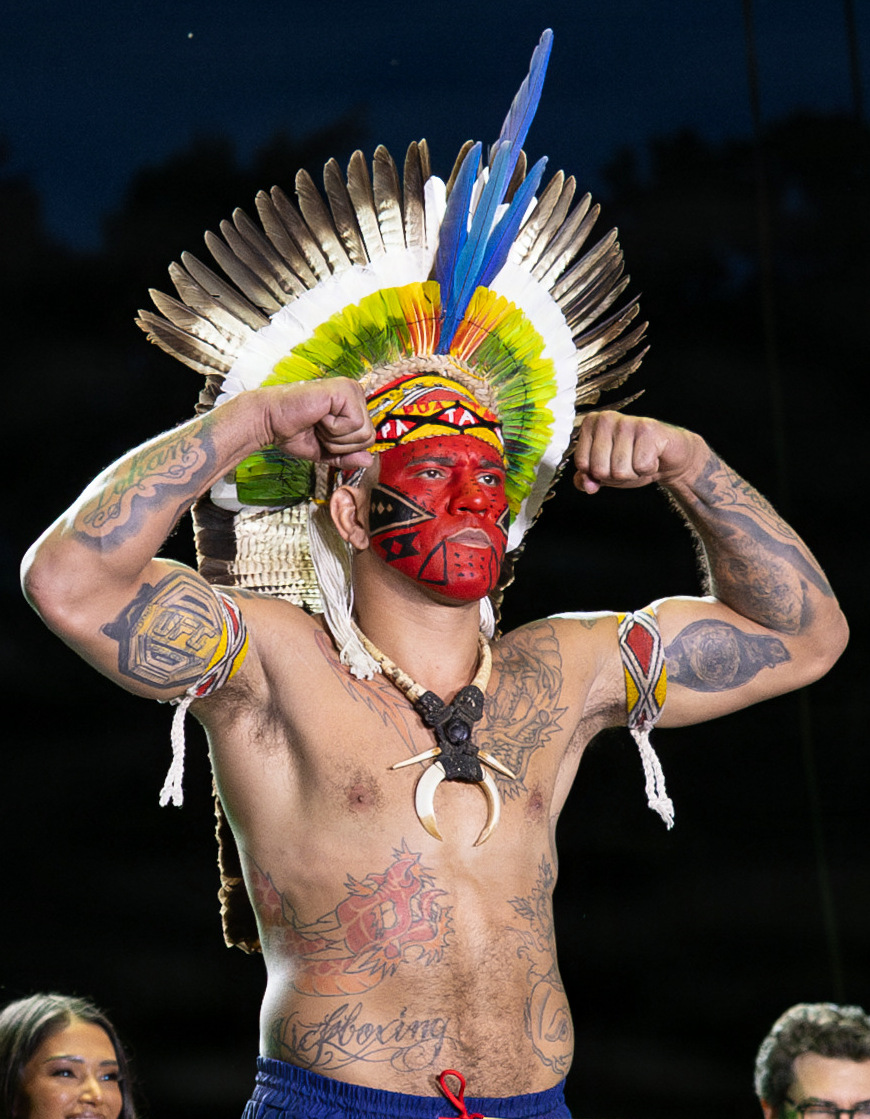
Pereira wearing body paint and adornments inspired by his Pataxó indigenous heritage during the UFC Freedom 250 ceremonial weigh-ins.

Pereira has two sons with his ex-wife.

Pereira has indigenous ancestry from the Pataxó tribe. His nickname "Poatan" means "Stone Hands" in the Tupi language, though this is not the ethnic language of the Pataxó. The nickname was given to him by his first kickboxing trainer Belocqua Wera, who was also responsible for helping Pereira discover his indigenous ancestry. Pereira has frequently used his indigenous ancestry as part of his promotion and imagery, ever since his first match against Adesanya he has used traditional indigenous garbs on the weigh-ins and after his victory of the Middleweight belt, he brought it to the Porto do Boi Pataxó indigenous reservation.

He has a younger sister, Aline Pereira, who competes in Karate Combat and previously for Glory and LFA.

Alex Pereira founded the "Instituto Poatan" in São Paulo, which offers free combat sports training, English lessons, and computer classes. During a September 2025 appearance on The Ariel Helwani Show, Pereira said “It has over 700 registered kids. We offer kickboxing, jiu-jitsu, computer and English classes for free. It's a success and I'm happy to help these kids, many from poor backgrounds with challenges like alcohol and drugs.”

Before his UFC career, Pereira was convicted of domestic violence towards his ex-wife and served an 18-day sentence in Brazil. In 2024, a woman publicly accused Pereira of sexually assaulting her at a New Jersey hotel after a UFC event. In July 2025, a former partner filed a case in Miami against Pereira, alleging further domestic violence and sexual assault. Pereira has denied both allegations. In January 2026, Pereira publicly confirmed that he was dating fellow fighter Tracy Cortez. Pereira ended their relationship a week later.

== Championships and accomplishments ==
=== Mixed martial arts ===
- Ultimate Fighting Championship
  - UFC Light Heavyweight Championship (Two times)
    - Three successful title defenses (first reign)
    - Shortest time and fewest bouts to win championships in two divisions in UFC history (736 days/7 bouts)
    - Shortest time for three consecutive title defenses in UFC history (175 days)
    - Tied (Chuck Liddell) for second most UFC Light Heavyweight title fight wins (5) (behind Jon Jones)
    - Tied (Chuck Liddell) for most knockouts in UFC Light Heavyweight title fights (5)
  - UFC Middleweight Championship (One time)
    - First and only fighter to win the UFC Middleweight and Light Heavyweight championships
    - Fewest MMA bouts to become a two-division UFC champion (11 bouts)
    - Second most knockouts in UFC title fights (6) (behind Anderson Silva)
    - Second fewest MMA bouts to become a UFC champion (8) (behind Brock Lesnar)
  - Performance of the Night (Six times) vs. Andreas Michailidis, Sean Strickland, Israel Adesanya 1, Jiří Procházka (x2) and Magomed Ankalaev
  - Fight of the Night (One time) vs. Khalil Rountree Jr.
  - Second highest significant strike percentage in UFC history (61.36%) (Over 1000 attempted significant strikes)
    - Highest significant strike percentage in UFC Light Heavyweight division history (64.3%)
  - Latest knockout in a UFC Middleweight title fight (2:01 of R5 vs Israel Adesanya 1)
  - Holds wins over six former UFC champions — Israel Adesanya, Sean Strickland, Jan Błachowicz, Jiří Procházka (x2), Jamahal Hill and Magomed Ankalaev.
  - 2026 Forrest Griffin Community Award
  - UFC Honors Awards
    - 2021: Fan's Choice Debut of the Year Nominee vs. Andreas Michailidis
    - 2022: Fan's Choice Comeback of the Year Nominee vs. Israel Adesanya 1
    - 2024: President's Choice Fight of the Year Nominee vs. Khalil Rountree Jr., President's Choice Performance of the Year Nominee vs. Jiří Procházka 2 & Fan's Choice Knockout of the Year Nominee vs. Jamahal Hill
  - UFC.com Awards
    - 2022: Ranked #2 Fighter of the Year, Ranked #4 Upset of the Year vs. Israel Adesanya 1 & Ranked #6 Knockout of the Year vs. Sean Strickland
    - 2023: Ranked #9 Fighter of the Year
    - 2024: Fighter of the Year (Tied with Ilia Topuria), Ranked #4 Knockout of the Year vs. Jamahal Hill, Ranked #5 Knockout of the Year vs. Jiří Procházka 2, Ranked #2 Fight of the Year vs. Khalil Rountree Jr. & Half-Year Awards: Best Fighter of the 1HY
- MMA Junkie
  - 2022 July Knockout of the Month vs. Sean Strickland
  - 2022 Male Fighter of the Year
  - 2022 Breakout Fighter of the Year
- ESPN
  - 2022 Male Fighter of the Year
  - 2024 Male Fighter of the Year
  - 2024 Best Moment
- Sherdog
  - 2022 Breakthrough Fighter of the Year
  - 2022 Fighter of the Year
- MMA Fighting
  - 2022 Male Fighter of the Year
  - 2022 First Team MMA All-Star
  - 2024 First Team MMA All-Star
- Sports Illustrated
  - 2022 Breakout Fighter of the Year
- Yahoo! Sports
  - 2022 Male Fighter of the Year
- MMA Mania
  - 2022 Fighter of the Year
  - 2024 #2 Ranked Fighter of the Year
  - 2024 #5 Ranked Fight of the Year vs. Khalil Rountree Jr. at UFC 307
- Combat Press
  - 2022 Male Fighter of the Year
  - 2024 Male Fighter of the Year
- Cageside Press
  - 2024 Male Fighter of the Year
- World MMA Awards
  - 2023 Breakthrough Fighter of the Year
  - 2024 Charles 'Mask' Lewis Fighter of the Year
- Wrestling Observer Newsletter
  - Mixed Martial Arts Most Valuable (2024)
  - Most Outstanding Fighter of the Year (2024)
  - Best Box Office Draw (2024)
- Fight Matrix
  - 2022 Most Improved Fighter of the Year
  - 2024 Male Fighter of the Year
- CBS Sports
  - 2022 UFC Fighter of the Year
- Bleacher Report
  - 2022 UFC Fighter of the Year
- LowKick MMA
  - 2022 Fighter of the Year
  - 2024 Male Fighter of the Year
- GiveMeSport
  - 2022 UFC Fighter of the Year

=== Kickboxing ===
Professional

- Glory
  - 2023 Glory Hall of Fame Inductee
  - 2021 Glory Light Heavyweight Champion
  - 2019 Glory interim Light Heavyweight Champion
  - 2017 Glory Middleweight Champion (five defenses)
  - 2014 Glory Middleweight Contender Tournament Winner
- WGP Kickboxing
  - 2015 WGP Kickboxing Middleweight Champion (1 defense)
  - 2012 WGP -85 kg/187 lb Championship
- World Association of Kickboxing Organizations
  - 2013 WAKO Pro Panamerican K-1 -85 kg/187 lb Champion
- Jungle Fight
  - 2012 Jungle Fight Middleweight Champion

Amateur

- World Association of Kickboxing Organizations
  - 2013 silver medal in WAKO World Championships in Guaruja, Brasil K-1 -91 kg

Awards

- Glory
  - Glory Fighter of the Year 2019
- Combat Press
  - 2017 Fight of the Year (vs. Israel Adesanya)
  - 2019 Knockout of the Year (vs. Jason Wilnis)

=== Other ===
- Ellis Island Honors Society
  - 2025 Beacon Award

== Mixed martial arts record ==
Professional record breakdown
17 matches	13 wins	4 losses
By knockout	11	2
By submission	0	1
By decision	2	1

Res.	Record	Opponent	Method	Event	Date	Round	Time	Location	Notes
Loss	13–4	Ciryl Gane	TKO (punches)	UFC Freedom 250	14 June 2026	2	1:27	Washington, D.C., United States	Heavyweight debut. For the interim UFC Heavyweight Championship.
Win	13–3	Magomed Ankalaev	TKO (punches and elbows)	UFC 320	4 October 2025	1	1:20	Las Vegas, Nevada, United States	Won the UFC Light Heavyweight Championship. Performance of the Night. Later vacated the title on 11 April 2026.
Loss	12–3	Magomed Ankalaev	Decision (unanimous)	UFC 313	8 March 2025	5	5:00	Las Vegas, Nevada, United States	Lost the UFC Light Heavyweight Championship.
Win	12–2	Khalil Rountree Jr.	TKO (punches)	UFC 307	5 October 2024	4	4:32	Salt Lake City, Utah, United States	Defended the UFC Light Heavyweight Championship. Fight of the Night.
Win	11–2	Jiří Procházka	TKO (head kick and punches)	UFC 303	29 June 2024	2	0:13	Las Vegas, Nevada, United States	Defended the UFC Light Heavyweight Championship. Performance of the Night.
Win	10–2	Jamahal Hill	KO (punches)	UFC 300	13 April 2024	1	3:14	Las Vegas, Nevada, United States	Defended the UFC Light Heavyweight Championship.
Win	9–2	Jiří Procházka	TKO (elbows)	UFC 295	11 November 2023	2	4:08	New York City, New York, United States	Won the vacant UFC Light Heavyweight Championship. Performance of the Night.
Win	8–2	Jan Błachowicz	Decision (split)	UFC 291	29 July 2023	3	5:00	Salt Lake City, Utah, United States	Light Heavyweight debut.
Loss	7–2	Israel Adesanya	KO (punches)	UFC 287	8 April 2023	2	4:21	Miami, Florida, United States	Lost the UFC Middleweight Championship.
Win	7–1	Israel Adesanya	TKO (punches)	UFC 281	12 November 2022	5	2:01	New York City, New York, United States	Won the UFC Middleweight Championship. Performance of the Night.
Win	6–1	Sean Strickland	KO (punches)	UFC 276	2 July 2022	1	2:36	Las Vegas, Nevada, United States	Performance of the Night.
Win	5–1	Bruno Silva	Decision (unanimous)	UFC Fight Night: Santos vs. Ankalaev	12 March 2022	3	5:00	Las Vegas, Nevada, United States	
Win	4–1	Andreas Michailidis	TKO (flying knee and punches)	UFC 268	6 November 2021	2	0:18	New York City, New York, United States	Performance of the Night.
Win	3–1	Thomas Powell	KO (punch)	LFA 95	20 November 2020	1	4:04	Park City, Kansas, United States	
Win	2–1	Marcus Vinicius da Silveira	TKO (punches)	Jungle Fight 87	21 May 2016	2	4:55	São Paulo, Brazil	
Win	1–1	Marcelo Cruz	KO (punches)	Jungle Fight 85	23 January 2016	1	4:07	São Paulo, Brazil	
Loss	0–1	Quemuel Ottoni	Submission (rear-naked choke)	Jungle Fight 82	24 October 2015	3	2:52	São Paulo, Brazil	Middleweight debut.

== Pay-per-view bouts ==
No.	Event	Fight	Date	Venue	City	PPV buys
1.	UFC 281	Adesanya vs. Pereira	November 12, 2022	Madison Square Garden	New York City, New York, United States	Not Disclosed
2.	UFC 287	Pereira vs. Adesanya 2	April 8, 2023	Kaseya Center	Miami, Florida, United States	Not Disclosed
3.	UFC 295	Procházka vs. Pereira	November 11, 2023	Madison Square Garden	New York City, New York, United States	Not Disclosed
4.	UFC 300	Pereira vs. Hill	April 13, 2024	T-Mobile Arena	Las Vegas, Nevada, United States	615,000
5.	UFC 303	Pereira vs. Procházka 2	June 29, 2024	T-Mobile Arena	Las Vegas, Nevada, United States	274,000
6.	UFC 307	Pereira vs. Rountree Jr.	October 5, 2024	Delta Center	Salt Lake City, Utah, United States	Not Disclosed
7.	UFC 313	Pereira vs. Ankalaev	March 8, 2025	T-Mobile Arena	Las Vegas, Nevada, United States	Not Disclosed
8.	UFC 320	Ankalaev vs. Pereira 2	October 4, 2025	T-Mobile Arena	Las Vegas, Nevada, United States	Not Disclosed

== Kickboxing record ==
Professional kickboxing record (incomplete)
33 wins (21 KOs), 7 losses (2 KOs)
Date	Result	Opponent	Event	Location	Method	Round	Time
2021-09-04	Loss	(Russia) Artem Vakhitov	Glory 78: Rotterdam	Rotterdam, Netherlands	Decision (Majority)	5	3:00
Loses the Glory Light Heavyweight Championship.
2021-01-30	Win	(Russia) Artem Vakhitov	Glory 77: Rotterdam	Rotterdam, Netherlands	Decision (Split)	5	3:00
Wins the Glory Light Heavyweight Championship.
2019-12-21	Win	(Turkey) Ertugrul Bayrak	Glory Collision 2	Arnhem, Netherlands	KO (Left Hook)	1	3:00
Defends the Glory Middleweight Championship.
2019-09-28	Win	(Suriname) Donegi Abena	Glory 68: Miami	Miami, United States	KO (Left Hook)	3	2:08
Wins the interim Glory Light Heavyweight Championship.
2019-05-17	Win	(Netherlands) Jason Wilnis	Glory 65: Utrecht	Utrecht, Netherlands	KO (Left Flying Knee)	1	1:31
Defends the Glory Middleweight Championship.
2018-09-14	Win	(Canada) Simon Marcus	Glory 58: Chicago	Chicago, United States	Decision (Unanimous)	5	3:00
Defends the Glory Middleweight Championship.
2018-07-20	Win	(Tunisia) Yousri Belgaroui	Glory 55: New York	New York, United States	KO (Right Hook)	1	2:16
Defends the Glory Middleweight Championship.
2017-12-09	Win	(Tunisia) Yousri Belgaroui	Glory 49: Rotterdam	Rotterdam, Netherlands	TKO (Doctor Stoppage)	3	1:54
Defends the Glory Middleweight Championship.
2017-10-14	Win	(Canada) Simon Marcus	Glory 46: China	Guangzhou, China	Decision (Unanimous)	5	3:00
Wins the Glory Middleweight Championship.
2017-09-16	Win	(Brazil) Maycon Silva	WGP Kickboxing 40	Paraná, Brazil	KO (Left Hook)	2	2:00
Defends the WGP Kickboxing -85 kg title.
2017-04-29	Loss	(Tunisia) Yousri Belgaroui	Glory 40: Copenhagen, Final	Copenhagen, Denmark	Decision (Unanimous)	3	3:00
2017-04-29	Win	(Albania) Burim Rama	Glory 40: Copenhagen, Semi Final	Copenhagen, Denmark	TKO (Right Hook)	3	1:42
2017-03-04	Win	(Nigeria) Israel Adesanya	Glory of Heroes 7	Sao Paulo, Brazil	KO (Left Hook)	3	N/A
2016-07-31	Loss	(Ukraine) Artur Kyshenko	Kunlun Fight 48	Jining, China	TKO (Punches)	2	2:55
2016-05-08	Win	(Brazil) Junior Alpha	WGP Kickboxing 30	Brazil	KO (Right Hook)	4	N/A
2016-04-02	Win	(Nigeria) Israel Adesanya	Glory of Heroes 1	China	Decision (Unanimous)	5	N/A
2015-07-25	Win	(Brazil) César Almeida	WGP Kickboxing 25	São Paulo, Brazil	Decision	5	3:00
Wins the vacant WGP Kickboxing -85 kg title.
2015-04-03	Loss	(Netherlands) Jason Wilnis	Glory 20: Dubai - Middleweight Contender Tournament, Semi Finals	Dubai, UAE	Decision (Unanimous)	3	3:00
2014-12-20	Win	(Chile) Ivan Galaz	WGP Kickboxing 24	São Paulo, Brazil	TKO (Three Knockdowns)	2	N/A
2014-09-27	Win	(Canada) Robert Thomas	WGP Kickboxing 22	Brazil	Decision (Unanimous)	3	3:00
2014-06-21	Loss	(Russia) Artem Levin	Glory 17: Los Angeles - Middleweight Last Man Standing Tournament, Quarter Finals	Inglewood, California, USA	Decision (Unanimous)	3	3:00
2014-04-26	Win	(Russia) Aleksandr Dmitrenko	WGP SUPER 4	São Paulo, Brazil	Decision (Unanimous)	3	3:00
2014-03-08	Win	(Armenia) Sahak Parparyan	Glory 14: Zagreb - Middleweight Contender Tournament, Final	Zagreb, Croatia	Decision (Majority)	3	3:00
Wins the Glory Middleweight Contender Tournament.
2014-03-08	Win	(United States) Dustin Jacoby	Glory 14: Zagreb - Middleweight Contender Tournament, Semi Finals	Zagreb, Croatia	KO (Left Hook)	1	2:02
2013-12-21	Loss	(Brazil) César Almeida	WGP Kickboxing 17, Final	São Paulo, Brazil	Decision	3	N/A
2013-12-21	Win	(Uruguay) Camilo Ferraz	WGP Kickboxing 17, Semi Final	São Paulo, Brazil	KO (Right Knee)	1	N/A
2013-08-24	Win	(Argentina) Matías Adaro	WGP Kickboxing 15	São Paulo, Brazil	KO (Right Cross)	2	N/A
Wins the WAKO Pro Panamerican -85 kg/187 lb Championship K-1 Rules.
2013-03-23	Win	(Brazil) César Almeida	SUPERKOMBAT New Heroes 2	São Caetano, Brazil	Decision (Unanimous)	3	N/A
2012-11-10	Loss	(Netherlands) Jason Wilnis	It's Showtime 60	São Paulo, Brazil	TKO (Retirement)	2	N/A
Fight was for vacant It's Showtime 85MAX Championship.
2012-09-16	Win	(Brazil) Felipe Micheletti	WGP Kickboxing 9	São Paulo, Brazil	Decision (Unanimous)	3	N/A
2012-07-07	Win	(Brazil) Clei Silva	WGP Kickboxing, Final	São Paulo, Brazil	Decision	3	N/A
Wins the WGP Kickboxing -85 kg title.
2012-07-07	Win	(Brazil) Fabio Alberto	WGP Kickboxing, Semi finals	São Paulo, Brazil	KO	1	N/A
2012-03-31	Win	(Brazil) Clei Silva	Jungle Fight 37	São Paulo, Brazil	Decision (Unanimous)	3	N/A
Wins the Brazilian -85 kg/187 lb Championship K-1 Rules.

Amateur kickboxing record
Date	Result	Opponent	Event	Location	Method	Round	Time
2013-10	Loss	(Lithuania) Sergej Maslobojev	W.A.K.O World Championships 2013, K-1 Final -91 kg	Guaruja, Brasil	Decision	3	2:00
Wins W.A.K.O. World Championship '13 K-1 Silver Medal -91 kg.
2013-10	Win	(Italy) Mattia Faraoni	W.A.K.O World Championships 2013, K-1 Semi Finals -91 kg	Guaruja, Brasil	Decision (Split)	3	2:00
2013-10	Win	(New Zealand) Selby Devereux	W.A.K.O World Championships 2013, K-1 Quarter Finals -91 kg	Guaruja, Brasil	Knockout	N/A	N/A
Legend: Win Loss Draw/No contest Notes

== Professional boxing record ==
1 fight	1 win	0 losses
By knockout	1	0

No.	Result	Record	Opponent	Type	Round, time	Date	Location	Notes
1	Win	1–0	Marcelo de Souza Cruz	TKO	3 (4)	Jun 17, 2017	Hotel Golden Park, Sorocaba, São Paulo, Brazil	

== See also ==
- Double champions in MMA
- List of current UFC fighters
- List of male boxers
- List of male kickboxers
- List of male mixed martial artists
- List of mixed martial artists with professional boxing records
- List of multi-sport athletes
- List of multi-sport champions
- List of prizefighters with professional boxing and kickboxing records
- List of UFC champions

Achievements
New tournament	1st Glory Middleweight Contender Tournament Champion; 2014	Succeeded by Simon Marcus
Preceded by Simon Marcus	5th Glory Middleweight Champion; October 14, 2017 – March 18, 2021; Vacated title	Vacant Title next held by Donovan Wisse
Preceded by Pavel Zhuravlev	3rd Glory Interim Light Heavyweight Champion; September 28, 2019 – January 30, 2021; Unified titles	Vacant Title next held by Tarik Khbabez
Preceded by Artem Vakhitov	4th Glory Light Heavyweight Champion; January 30, 2021 – September 4, 2021	Succeeded by Artem Vakhitov
Preceded by Israel Adesanya	5th UFC Middleweight Champion; 12 November 2022 – 8 April 2023	Succeeded by Israel Adesanya
Vacant Title last held by Jamahal Hill	19th UFC Light Heavyweight Champion; 11 November 2023 – 8 March 2025	Succeeded by Magomed Ankalaev
Preceded by Magomed Ankalaev	21st UFC Light Heavyweight Champion; 4 October 2025 – 11 April 2026; Vacated	Vacant Title next held by Carlos Ulberg
Awards
Preceded by Paddy Pimblett	World MMA Breakthrough Fighter of the Year; 2022–23	Succeeded by Tom Aspinall
Preceded by Leon Edwards	World MMA Fighter of the Year; 2023–24	Incumbent
