= Joe Schilling =

American kickboxer and mixed martial artist

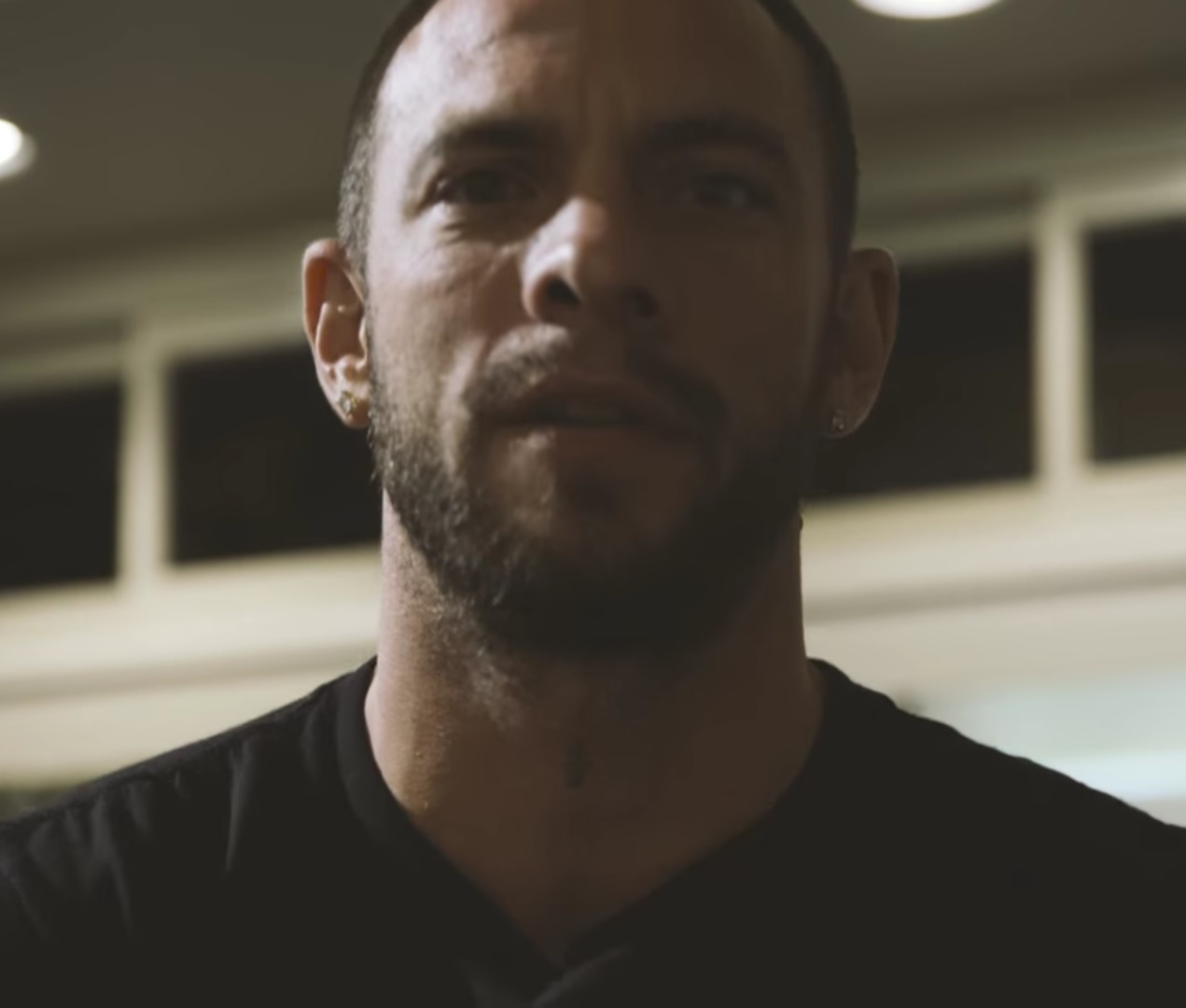
- in 2015
- Born: Joseph Francis Schilling; January 13, 1984 (age 42); Dayton, Ohio, U.S.
- Other names: Stitch 'em Up
- Height: 6 ft 3 in (191 cm)
- Weight: 185 lb (84 kg; 13 st 3 lb)
- Division: Super Middleweight; Light Heavyweight; Middleweight (MMA)
- Reach: 75 1/2 in (192 cm)
- Style: Muay Thai
- Fighting out of: Los Angeles, California, U.S.
- Team: The Yard (2007–present); American Top Team (2015–present); Cesar Gracie Jiu-Jitsu; Sanford MMA
- Trainer: Mark Komuro; Cesar Gracie
- Years active: 2005–present

Professional boxing record
- Total: 2
- Wins: 1
- By knockout: 1
- Losses: 0
- Draws: 1

Kickboxing record
- Total: 32
- Wins: 23
- By knockout: 13
- Losses: 9
- By knockout: 5

Mixed martial arts record
- Total: 11
- Wins: 4
- By knockout: 2
- By submission: 1
- By decision: 1
- Losses: 7
- By knockout: 3
- By submission: 3
- By decision: 1

Other information
- Boxing record from BoxRec
- Mixed martial arts record from Sherdog

Joseph Francis Schilling (born January 13, 1984) is an American professional Muay Thai kickboxer and mixed martial artist who most recently competed for Bellator Kickboxing in the Middleweight division, and in the Middleweight division for Bellator MMA. He was released from Bellator in October 2020 after the Mohegan Tribe Department of Athletic Regulations refused to grant him a license to fight.

Known for his use of elbows to cut opponents and nicknamed "Stitch 'em Up", Schilling began fighting professionally in 2006 and was a two-time national titlist before defeating Kaoklai Kaennorsing to become the WBC Muay Thai Interim World Light Heavyweight Champion in 2011. His profile further increased the following year when he engaged in a controversial rivalry with Simon Marcus.

In November 2014, when the rankings were first established, Schilling was ranked second in the world. By November 1, 2018, he was ranked seventh among the world’s middleweight kickboxers by Combat Press, remaining in the rankings until his retirement.

Schilling gained notoriety for a 2021 bar altercation where he assaulted a fellow patron. Schilling was later acquitted of charges of battery and negligence, on account of Florida's "stand your ground" law.

== Background ==
Born and raised in Dayton, Ohio, Schilling was raised by a single mother alongside two other siblings. A troublesome child, Schilling was expelled from four different schools and took up Muay Thai at 15 years old, hoping that it would give him direction and focus. After being kicked out of the family home at 17, he worked odd jobs and began his fighting career in local Toughman Contests while living in a small property that his grandmother owned with his brother Kevin. After his grandmother died, Schilling moved to Los Angeles, California where he found work as a personal trainer at a YMCA. He met his future trainer and business partner Mark Komuro while training at the LA Boxing Club, in downtown Los Angeles. When that gym shut down, the pair moved to a spartan gym situated in a dilapidated structure that had formerly housed the Lincoln Heights city jail, with Schilling being announced at fights as fighting out of "The Jail." In keeping with that theme, when Schilling and Komuro decided to open their own gym, they were inspired to name it after the exercise area in prison, and in 2007 they opened The Yard, a Muay Thai gym located in Lincoln Heights.

== Career ==
=== Early career (2006–2009) ===
After a short and unremarkable amateur career, Schilling turned professional on September 30, 2006, taking on Lawson Baker in an 84 kg/185 lb bout on ten days' notice in Inglewood, California. He recalls striking his opponent with all his might, only to watch him continue to advance unfazed. After being dropped multiple times and nearly throwing in the towel, Schilling finally found the one weapon that worked, elbows. 47 landed elbows later, he won his first professional Muay Thai fight by way of split decision.

Having amassed an undefeated record over the course of the next year, Schilling was given the opportunity to fight for the vacant International Karate Kickboxing Council (IKKC) United States Super Middleweight (-75 kg/165 lb) Muay Thai Championship against Russian import Denis Grachev in Highland, California, on November 29, 2007. Grachev defeated Schilling with a 47-second knockout in the first round after Grachev delivered a spinning heel kick to the body, as Schilling was unable to beat the referee's ten count.

Throughout 2008, he turned his focus towards mixed martial arts and amassed a 1–3 record in the sport with all of his bouts ending in a submission. Schilling also debuted as a professional boxer on December 20, 2008, and knocked out his opponent Orlando Brizzio in just five seconds, the fastest KO in American combat sports history. He made his return to Muay Thai in early 2009 and took wins over Chidi Njokuani and Chris Spång before experiencing a devastating loss to Wang Hong Xiang on August 30, 2009, in Las Vegas, Nevada. Fighting under Sanshou rules for the first time, Schilling was repeatedly thrown and taken down throughout the bout and injured both of his knees. He was counted out by the referee in round two when he could not continue after a leg sweep. He required surgery on his knees after the fight which resulted in a year-long layoff.

=== United States Champion (2010–2011) ===
Schilling made his return to the ring on September 26, 2010, in his adopted hometown of Los Angeles where he faced Ryan Roy in a bout for the Muay Thai Association of America (MTAA) United States Super Middleweight (-75 kg/165 lb) Championship. After dominating Roy in the first round utilizing his height advantage with knees from the Thai clinch, Schilling forced the referee to stop the contest in the second when he barraged his opponent with a series of unanswered elbows. Less than a month later, he made his international debut as he defeated Argentine opponent Luciano Vazquez via fourth round technical knockout at the historic Rajadamnern Stadium in Bangkok, Thailand on October 24, 2010.

On December 5, 2010, in Los Angeles, he beat Chaz Mulkey by third-round TKO in a WBC Muay Thai United States Super Middleweight (-76.204 kg/168 lb) title eliminator. He knocked Mulkey down four times throughout the bout, causing a referee stoppage. Schilling was then scheduled to face Ky Hollenbeck for the WBC National Super Middleweight Championship on March 5, 2011, in Los Angeles but Hollenbeck withdrew from the bout to fight for a world title and was replaced by Chase Green, and so the interim belt was then put on the line instead. After forcing a standing eight count on Green with a combination of a thip to the face and punches early in round one, he pounced on his hurt opponent and finished the fight with a flurry of strikes at the 2:13 mark of the opening stanza.

Schilling was expected to fight at the Stand Up Promotions' World Class Championship Muay Thai event in Anaheim, California, on August 13, 2011 but he dropped out to fight Brandon Banda for the vacant WBC United States Light Heavyweight (-79.379 kg/175 lb) Championship at Lion Fight: Battle in the Desert 3 in Primm, Nevada, a week later. The bout was the pair's rubber match as they had gone 1-1 as amateurs, and Schilling took the lead in their rivalry as he knocked his foe unconscious with a knee strike inside the opening round to claim his second national title.

=== Entry onto the world stage (2011–2012) ===
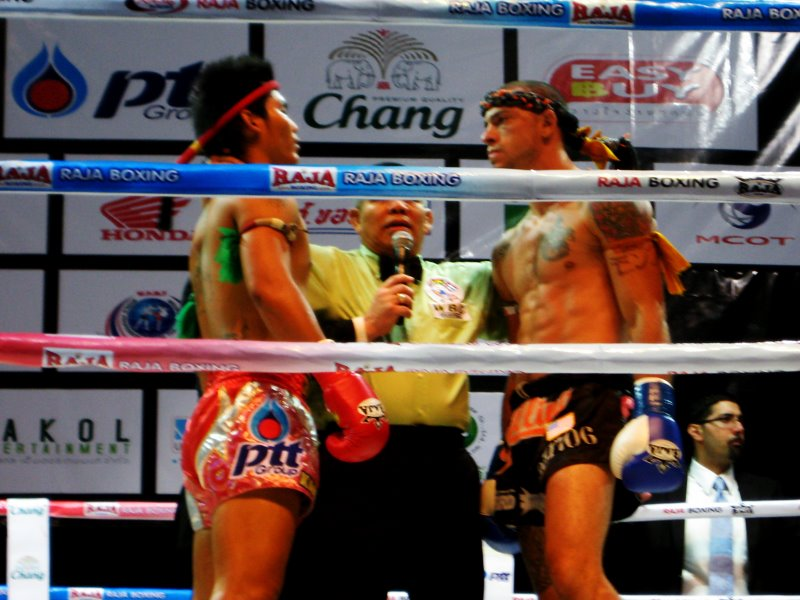
Joe Schilling vs. Kaoklai Kaennorsing

Having established himself as an elite fighter domestically, Schilling was matched up with two-time Rajadamnern Stadium Champion and K-1 star Kaoklai Kaennorsing in a WBC Interim World Light Heavyweight Championship bout at the M-One: Thailand vs. America event held at the Nokia Theatre L.A. Live on October 21, 2011. The fight was one-sided in favour of Schilling, as he floored the Thai in the opening seconds and again immediately after he beat the referee's eight count. After a period of clinching, he knocked Kaoklai down for the third time with a right hook towards the end of the round, ending the fight.

In January 2012, Schilling and former foe Chaz Mulkey were brought in as sparring partners for MMA star Nick Diaz ahead of his Interim UFC Welterweight Championship match with Carlos Condit at UFC 143.

Schilling and Canada's Simon Marcus went head to head in a bout to determine North America's top Light Heavyweight at Lion Fight: Battle in the Desert 5 in Las Vegas on February 25, 2012. Both men agreed to a "winner takes all" scenario, meaning that whoever came out victorious would take 100% of the fight purse, and the fight ended as controversially as it began. In round one, Marcus tripped Schilling, sending his head slamming into the canvas. As Schilling returned to his feet, clearly hurt from the throw, Marcus stormed in and knocked him down with a left hook. He was able to beat the count but Marcus went on the attack again and knocked Schilling out with a right elbow soon after. After the fight, Schilling's camp made the accusation that the sweep that Marcus used to daze him initially was illegal and appealed to the Nevada State Athletic Commission to have the bout result overturned to a no contest, which was rejected.

Due to the controversy surrounding the ending of their first fight, Schilling and Simon Marcus rematched at Lion Fight 6 in Las Vegas on May 12, 2012, in a bout to determine the number one contender for Artem Levin's WBC World Light Heavyweight Championship. It was close this time, with both men exchanging menacing shots. Marcus' knees and throws from the clinch would be the deciding factor, however, as he was awarded the majority decision (47-47, 48-47, 49-46).

Despite losing in the number one contender's match, Schilling was to be given a shot at Artem Levin and his WBC World Light Heavyweight Championship at the Battle for the Belts event in Bangkok, Thailand on June 9, 2012, after Simon Marcus pulled out. However, Levin himself then withdrew due to knee surgery and, while Artem Vakhitov was originally tabbed as his replacement, Karapet Karapetyan eventually stepped in as the final opponent and Schilling's interim title was put on the line. Having dominated every round but the third, Schilling won on the judges' scorecards to make the first defence of his interim belt.

In the main event of Lion Fight 7 in Las Vegas on October 13, 2012, he met Eddie Walker in an 82 kg/180 lb bout. Schilling attacked Walker's lead leg from the start and scored knockdowns with elbows in rounds one and two. As Schilling got more aggressive towards the end of round two and began to look for the finish, Walker let his hands go and connected with a short right cross which sent Schilling crashing to the canvas in a state of unconsciousness.

He was slated to fight Edwin Aguilar at Lion Fight 9 in Las Vegas on March 15, 2013 but was denied a license due to medical concerns by the Nevada State Athletic Commission. It was also reported that he would face Steven Wakeling under Oriental kickboxing rules at GLORY 5: London in London, England, on March 23, 2013 but he was replaced by his old foe Simon Marcus in that bout after rejecting the contract from GLORY.

He was set to make his return against Charles Byrd at Lion Fight 10 in Las Vegas on July 26, 2013. However, he was removed from the card and the Lion Fight roster when he refused to sign an exclusive contract with the promotion.

=== GLORY (2013–2016) ===
Schilling finally made his GLORY debut when he competed in and won the four-man 85 kg/187 lb tournament at GLORY 10: Los Angeles - Middleweight World Championship Tournament in Ontario, California, on September 28, 2013. He was scheduled to fight Steve Wakeling in the semi-finals but the Englishman was unable to compete due to visa issues and was replaced by Kengo Shimizu. Schilling took a dominant unanimous decision over Shimizu before meeting Artem Levin in the final. Levin had a strong first round but Schilling bounced back to floor the Russian with a right overhand followed by a knee in the second. The bout was ruled a draw after the regulation three rounds and so it went to an extension round to decide the winner in which Schilling scored a controversial knockdown and secured himself the unanimous decision.

He fought up-and-comer Wayne Barrett in the main event of GLORY 12: New York - Lightweight World Championship Tournament in New York City, New York, on November 23, 2013, losing a unanimous decision. Barrett dropped Schilling twice in round two but Schilling rallied back to score a knockdown of his own with a knee in the third. It was too little, too late, however, as he lost the fight on points.

It was announced during the GLORY 15: Istanbul broadcast that Schilling would be one of eight fighters competing in the GLORY 17: Los Angeles - Last Man Standing Middleweight Tournament in Inglewood on June 21, 2014. It was later revealed that Schilling would face Simon Marcus for the third time in the quarter-finals. He drew Simon Marcus for the third time in the quarter-finals and was floored with a flurry of punches by his Canadian rival in round two. He outworked Marcus in rounds one and three, however, and the judges scored the match a unanimous draw to send it into an extension round to decide the winner. Marcus was docked a point by referee "Big" John McCarthy for dropping his gumshield numerous times and, now forced to go for the knockout, was caught by a counter right cross from Schilling in the last twenty seconds of the fight which left him unconscious on the mat. Rematching Wayne Barrett in the semis, Schilling got revenge on another of his rivals as he took a split decision victory to book his place in the final against the man he faced in the tournament final a year earlier, Artem Levin. Levin scored a first-round knockdown over Schilling with a spinning backfist and was later docked a point by referee Al Wichgers for extensive clinching in round three. It was not enough for Schilling, however, as he lost a clear-cut unanimous decision.

Schilling returned to the GLORY ring to face Robert Thomas on February 6, 2015, at GLORY 19: Virginia. He won the fight by unanimous decision.

=== Bellator MMA (2014–2020) ===
On October 3, 2014, it was announced that Schilling had signed with Bellator MMA. He made his debut against fellow kickboxer Melvin Manhoef on November 15, 2014, at Bellator 131. Schilling won the back-and-forth fight via knockout in the second round.

In his second fight for the promotion, Schilling faced Rafael Carvalho on April 10, 2015, at Bellator 136. He lost the back and forth fight via split decision.

In his third fight for the promotion, Schilling faced promotional newcomer Hisaki Kato at Bellator 139 on June 26, 2015. Schilling lost the fight via knockout in the second round. This marked the first time Schilling has been knocked out in a mixed martial arts match.

Schilling made his return to Bellator on November 30, 2018, at Bellator 210 facing Will Morris He won the fight via technical knockout due to corner stoppage.

Schilling faced Keith Berry at Bellator 219 on March 29, 2019. He won the fight via unanimous decision.

Schilling faced Tony Johnson at Bellator 229 on October 4, 2019. He lost the fight via knockout in the third round.

Schilling was scheduled to face Curtis Millender at Bellator 249 on October 15, 2020. However, the bout was scrapped as Schilling's license was denied by the athletic commission.

Bellator MMA announced on October 27, 2020, that Schilling had been released from the promotion.

=== Bellator Kickboxing (2016–2017) ===
On June 24, 2016, Schilling made his debut for Bellator Kickboxing facing Hisaki Kato in a rematch at Bellator Kicking 2. He lost the fight via knockout due to a spinning back fist in the second round.

=== Karate Combat ===
Schilling faced Luke Rockhold on April 20, 2024 at Karate Combat 45 in Dubai in a 195 pound catchweight bout. He lost the bout from a right hook knockout in the third round.

=== Professional Fighters League ===
Schilling made his come back to MMA and faced Donegi Abena on May 23, 2026, at PFL Brussels. The bout was ended when Schilling refused to continue the fight after being fouled by a headbutt in 36 seconds into the first round. Therefore, Abena awarded by TKO victory via Schilling’s retirement from the fight, despite the obvious foul.

== Personal life ==
Schilling has two sons, Joe and Jax, with his wife Cina Brown. He is a cigarette smoker, an unusual trait for a professional fighter, and also uses marijuana.

He appeared in a minor role in the 2016 film Kickboxer: Vengeance.

=== Street altercations ===
Following his Bellator Kickboxing 4 win over Vittorio Iermano at the Nelson Mandela Forum in Florence, Italy on December 10, 2016, Schilling and two of his coaches were involved in a street altercation outside the venue with a group of seven locals.

In September 2020, Schilling posted an Instagram Live video showing himself kicking a homeless man on a street, and claiming that he attacked the man after finding the victim using a sex toy in the showers of Schilling's gym.

Footage emerged on June 28, 2021, showing Schilling punching and knocking unconscious 31-year-old Justin Balboa in a bar in Fort Lauderdale, Florida, the previous night. Balboa was hospitalized with a head injury. Schilling claimed self-defense, saying that he was "scared for [his] life" and "simply defending [himself] against the evil in this world". On July 1, Balboa filed a personal injury lawsuit in Broward County circuit court against Schilling for battery, and the bar where the incident took place for negligence.

In April 2023, Broward County Circuit Judge Fabienne E. Fahnestock issued a ruling on the Fort Lauderdale case, declaring Schilling's actions to be an act of self-defense according to Florida's stand-your-ground law, only the necessary amount of force to "neutralize the threat." The Florida court further declared Schilling's immunity over allegations of negligence and battery, as well as entitlement to compensation pursuant to §776.032.

== Championships and accomplishments ==
=== Kickboxing ===
- GLORY
  - 2013 GLORY Middleweight (-85 kg/187.4 lb) World Championship Tournament Champion
  - 2014 GLORY Middleweight (-85 kg/187.4 lb) Last Man Standing Tournament Runner-up
- Muay Thai Association of America
  - MTAA United States Super Middleweight (-75 kg/165 lb) Championship
- World Boxing Council Muaythai
  - WBC Muaythai United States Super Middleweight (-76.204 kg/168 lb) Championship
  - WBC Muaythai United States Light Heavyweight (-79.379 kg/175 lb) Championship
  - WBC Muaythai Interim World Light Heavyweight (-79.379 kg/175 lb) Championship

=== Mixed Martial Arts ===
- Combat Press
  - 2014 Knockout of the Year vs. Melvin Manhoef at Bellator 131

== Boxing record ==
Boxing record
1 Wins (1 (T)KO's), 0 Losses, 1 Draw
Date	Result	Opponent	Event	Location	Method	Round	Time	Record
2009-03-21	Draw	(United States) Tyrell Hendrix	Playboy Mansion	Beverly Hills, California, US	Technical Draw	2	3:00	1–0–1
2008-12-20	Win	(Italy) Orlando Brizzio	Hollywood Park Racetrack	Inglewood, California, US	KO	1	0:05	1–0
Legend: Win Loss Draw/No contest Notes

== Kickboxing record ==
Professional kickboxing record
23 wins (13 KOs), 9 losses, 0 draws
Date	Result	Opponent	Event	Location	Method	Round	Time	Record
2017-12-9	Win	(Belgium) Filip Verlinden	Bellator Kickboxing 8: Florence	Florence, Italy	Decision (unanimous)	3	3:00	23–9
2017-9-23	Win	(Morocco) Najib Idali	Bellator Kickboxing 7: San Jose	San Jose, California	TKO (doctor stoppage)	2	3:00	22–9
2017-4-14	Win	(Romania) Alexandru Negrea	Bellator Kickboxing 6: Budapest	Budapest, Hungary	Decision (unanimous)	3	3:00	21–9
2016-12-10	Win	(Italy) Vittorio Iermano	Bellator Kickboxing 4: Florence	Florence, Italy	TKO (strikes)	1	2:43	20–9
2016-06-24	Loss	(Japan) Hisaki Kato	Bellator Kickboxing 2: St. Louis	St. Louis, Missouri, USA	KO (spinning back fist)	2	2:59	19–9
2016-05-13	Loss	(Netherlands) Jason Wilnis	GLORY 30: Los Angeles	Ontario, California, US	Decision (majority)	3	3:00	19–8
2016-02-26	Win	(United States) Mike Lemaire	GLORY 27: Chicago	Hoffman Estates, Illinois, US	Decision (unanimous)	3	3:00	19–7
2015-10-09	Win	(Netherlands) Jason Wilnis	GLORY 24: Denver	Denver, Colorado, US	TKO (injury)	2	3:00	18–7
GLORY Middleweight Championship eliminator.
2015-02-06	Win	(Canada) Robert Thomas	GLORY 19: Virginia	Hampton, Virginia, US	Decision (unanimous)	3	3:00	17–7
2014-06-21	Loss	(Russia) Artem Levin	Glory 17: Los Angeles - Last Man Standing, Final	Inglewood, California, US	Decision (unanimous)	3	3:00	16–7
For the 2014 Glory Last Man Standing Middleweight (-84.8 kg/187 lb) Tournament Championship and the Glory Middleweight (-84.8 kg/187 lb) Championship.
2014-06-21	Win	(United States) Wayne Barrett	Glory 17: Los Angeles - Last Man Standing, Semi Finals	Inglewood, California, US	Decision (split)	3	3:00	16–6
2014-06-21	Win	(Canada) Simon Marcus	Glory 17: Los Angeles - Last Man Standing, Quarter Finals	Inglewood, California, US	KO (right cross)	4	2:41	15–6
2013-11-23	Loss	(United States) Wayne Barrett	Glory 12: New York - Lightweight World Championship Tournament	New York City, New York, US	Decision (unanimous)	3	3:00	14–6
2013-09-28	Win	(Russia) Artem Levin	Glory 10: Los Angeles - Middleweight World Championship Tournament, Final	Ontario, California, US	Extension round decision (unanimous)	3	3:00	14–5
Wins the 2013 Glory Middleweight (-84.8 kg/187 lb) World Championship Tournament Championship.
2013-09-28	Win	(Japan) Kengo Shimizu	Glory 10: Los Angeles - Middleweight World Championship Tournament, Semi Finals	Ontario, California, US	Decision (unanimous)	3	3:00	13–5
2012-10-13	Loss	(United States) Eddie Walker	Lion Fight 7	Las Vegas, Nevada, US	KO (right cross)	2	2:13	12–5
2012-06-09	Win	(Armenia) Karapet Karapetyan	Battle for the Belts	Bangkok, Thailand	Decision	5	3:00	12–4
Defends the WBC Muaythai Interim World Light Heavyweight (-79.379 kg/175 lb) Championship.
2012-05-12	Loss	(Canada) Simon Marcus	Lion Fight 6	Las Vegas, Nevada, US	Decision (majority)	5	3:00	11–4
2012-02-25	Loss	(Canada) Simon Marcus	Lion Fight: Battle in the Desert 5	Las Vegas, Nevada, US	KO (right elbow)	1	2:50	11–3
2011-10-21	Win	(Thailand) Kaoklai Kaennorsing	M-One: Thailand vs. America	Los Angeles, California, US	TKO (referee stoppage)	1	2:43	11–2
Wins the WBC Muaythai Interim World Light Heavyweight (-79.379 kg/175 lb) Championship.
2011-08-20	Win	(United States) Brandon Banda	Lion Fight: Battle in the Desert 3	Primm, Nevada, US	KO (right knee)	1	2:38	10–2
Wins the WBC Muaythai United States Light Heavyweight (-79.379 kg/175 lb) Championship.
2011-03-05	Win	(United States) Chase Green	MTAA Muay Thai National Championships	Los Angeles, California, US	TKO (referee stoppage)	1	2:13	9–2
Wins the WBC Muaythai Interim United States Super Middleweight (-76.204 kg/168 lb) Championship.
2010-12-05	Win	(United States) Chaz Mulkey	King's Birthday Celebration	Los Angeles, California, US	TKO (referee stoppage)	3	1:06	8–2
2010-10-24	Win	(Argentina) Luciano Vazquez	Bangrajan Fights, Rajadamnern Stadium	Bangkok, Thailand	TKO (referee stoppage)	4	N/A	7–2
2010-09-26	Win	(United States) Ryan Roy	MTAA National Muay Thai Championships	Los Angeles, California, US	TKO (referee stoppage)	2	N/A	6–2
Wins the MTAA United States Super Middleweight (-75 kg/165 lb) Championship.
2009-08-30	Loss	(China) Wang Hong Xiang	WCK World Championship Muay Thai	Las Vegas, Nevada, US	TKO (referee stoppage)	2	2:54	5–2
2009-06-13	Win	(Sweden) Chris Spång	WCK: Full Rules Muaythai	Inglewood, California, US	TKO (corner stoppage)	2	3:00	5–1
2009-04-25	Win	(United States) Chidi Njokuani	Dominant Knockout 1	Irving, Texas, US	Decision (unanimous)	5	3:00	4–1
2007-11-29	Loss	(Russia) Denis Grachev	WCK: Full Rules Muay Thai	Highland, California, US	KO (spinning heel kick to the body)	1	0:47	3–1
For the IKKC United States Super Middleweight (-75 kg/165 lb) Muay Thai Championship.
2007-07-07	Win	(United States) Neil Chatchaiyan	WCK World Championship Muay Thai: Hot Summer Fights	Inglewood, California, US	TKO (referee stoppage)	4	1:36	3–0
2007-04-05	Win	(United States) Gary Wheeler	WCK: Full Rules Muay Thai	Highland, California, US	TKO (cut)	3	0:53	2–0
2006-09-30	Win	(United States) Lawson Baker	World Championship Muay Thai: Ultimate Conquest	Inglewood, California, US	Decision (split)	4	3:00	1–0
Legend: Win Loss Draw/No contest Notes

== Mixed martial arts record ==
Professional record breakdown
11 matches	4 wins	7 losses
By knockout	2	3
By submission	1	3
By decision	1	1

Res.	Record	Opponent	Method	Event	Date	Round	Time	Location	Notes
Loss	4–7	Donegi Abena	TKO (retirement)	PFL Brussels: Habirora vs. Henderson	May 23, 2026	1	0:37	Brussels, Belgium	Light Heavyweight debut. Abena was deducted one point in round 1 due to a headbutt.
Loss	4–6	Tony Johnson	KO (punch)	Bellator 229	October 4, 2019	3	2:07	Temecula, California, United States	
Win	4–5	Keith Berry	Decision (unanimous)	Bellator 219	March 29, 2019	3	5:00	Temecula, California, United States	
Win	3–5	Will Morris	TKO (corner stoppage)	Bellator 210	November 30, 2018	1	5:00	Thackerville, Oklahoma, United States	
Loss	2–5	Hisaki Kato	KO (punch)	Bellator 139	June 26, 2015	2	0:34	Mulvane, Kansas, United States	
Loss	2–4	Rafael Carvalho	Decision (split)	Bellator 136	April 10, 2015	3	5:00	Irvine, California, United States	
Win	2–3	Melvin Manhoef	KO (punches)	Bellator 131	November 15, 2014	2	0:32	San Diego, California, United States	Middleweight debut.
Loss	1–3	Damion Douglas	Submission (rear-naked choke)	ShoXC: Elite Challenger Series 4	September 26, 2008	1	0:46	Santa Ynez, California, United States	
Loss	1–2	Tony Ferguson	Submission (rear-naked choke)	Total Fighting Alliance 12	September 13, 2008	2	2:12	Long Beach, California, United States	
Win	1–1	Maurice Doucette	Submission (triangle choke)	California Xtreme Fighting: Uprising in Upland	June 14, 2008	1	1:38	Upland, California, United States	
Loss	0–1	Matt Makowski	Submission (rear-naked choke)	ShoXC: Elite Challenger Series	January 25, 2008	1	4:01	Atlantic City, New Jersey, United States	Welterweight debut.

== Karate Combat record ==
Professional record breakdown
1 match	0 wins	1 loss
By knockout	0	1
By decision	0	0

Res.	Record	Opponent	Method	Event	Date	Round	Time	Location	Notes
Loss	0–1	Luke Rockhold	TKO (punches)	Karate Combat 45	April 20, 2024	3	1:43	Dubai, United Arab Emirates	

== See also ==
- List of male kickboxers
