= Wayne Barrett (kickboxer) =

American kickboxer

- Born: 1988 (age 37–38); Georgia, United States
- Height: 1.88 m (6 ft 2 in)
- Weight: 84.8 kg (187 lb; 13.35 st)
- Division: Cruiserweight
- Reach: 77.0 in (196 cm)
- Style: Kickboxing, Boxing, Muay Thai
- Stance: Orthodox
- Fighting out of: Queens, New York, United States
- Team: Square Circle Muay Thai; Renzo Gracie Fight Academy; American Top Team Whitestone; Church Street Boxing
- Trainer: Rob Rogan; Kelly Richardson; Jason Strout
- Years active: 2006–present

Kickboxing record
- Total: 12
- Wins: 7
- By knockout: 4
- Losses: 5
- By knockout: 2

Amateur record
- Total: 52
- Wins: 51
- By knockout: 25
- Losses: 1
- Draws: 0
- Last updated on: June 21, 2014

Wayne Barrett (born 1988) is an American kickboxer who competes in the cruiserweight division. A tall and rangy fighter, Barrett came to prominence as an amateur when he became a WKA national champion and turned professional in 2013. He signed with Glory after just one pro fight.

== Career ==
=== Early career (2006–2013) ===
Wayne Barrett began training in karate at ten years old before transitioning to Muay Thai and compiling a record of 19–1 with 15 knockouts as an amateur. He also successfully competed as an amateur boxer, winning a Golden Gloves title in his native Georgia and then relocating to New York City to train under Rob Rogan at Square Circe Muay Thai in Manhattan, Jason Strout for Striking at Church Street Boxing and Kelly Richardson at the Renzo Gracie Fight Academy in Brooklyn. Notable sparring partners of his include Douglas Lima, Jarrell Miller, James Besselman, Costas Philippou, Brian Stann, Gian Villante, David Branch and Eddie Walker.

He defeated Simon Camaj by unanimous decision to claim the WKA Amateur United States Cruiserweight (-86 kg/189 lb) Muay Thai Championship on April 29, 2011 and had his last match in the amateur ranks on December 7, 2012, taking a unanimous decision over Quinton O'Brien.

Barrett made his professional debut on February 22, 2013, at Take-On Muay Thai XIX, winning by technical knockout after forcing twelve fight pro Strahinja Ivanović to retire in round two.

=== Glory (2013–present) ===
Following this, Barrett signed with Glory as a competitor in the kickboxing organization's -85 kg/187 lb middleweight division. In his promotional debut against the previously undefeated Mike Lemaire at Glory 9: New York in New York City on June 22, 2013, it took him less than 2 rounds to establish his dominance in the ring as he scored an early standing eight count. In the second round, Barrett dropped Lemaire with a knee before stopping him with a left hook followed by a right cross that sent him crashing to the canvas face first.

In the reserve match for the Glory 10: Los Angeles - Middleweight World Championship Tournament in Ontario, California on September 28, 2013, Barrett delivered another impressive performance as he knocked out the overmatched Robby Plotkin in the first round after flooring him earlier.

Taking a large step up in competition in just his fourth fight, he was matched with the Glory Middleweight Tournament Champion Joe Schilling in the main event of Glory 12: New York in New York City on November 23, 2013. Barrett struck first in the second round when he knocked Schilling down twice. The first knockdown came from a right overhand early in the round and the second from a right hook as the round ended. In the third, Schilling was able to gain some ground back when he connected with a knee that dropped Barrett, but he was able to beat the count. The fight went to the judges and Barrett was awarded a unanimous decision victory.

It was announced during the Glory 15: Istanbul broadcast that Barrett would be one of eight fighters competing in the Glory 17: Los Angeles - Last Man Standing middleweight tournament in Inglewood, California on June 21, 2014. He drew Bogdan Stoica in the quarter-finals and won via third-round knockout when he countered one of the Romanian's signature flying knees with a vicious left hook. In the semis, he met Joe Schilling in a rematch but was unable to replicate his prior success against the Ohio native as he lost a split decision.

== Championships and awards ==
=== Boxing ===
- Georgia Golden Gloves
  - Georgia Golden Gloves Championship

=== Kickboxing ===
- World Kickboxing Association
  - WKA Amateur United States Cruiserweight (-86 kg/189 lb) Muay Thai Championship

== Kickboxing record ==
Professional kickboxing record
6 wins (4 KOs), 6 losses, 0 draws
Date	Result	Opponent	Event	Location	Method	Round	Time	Record
2017-12-01	Loss	(Canada) Robert Thomas	Glory 48: New York, Middleweight Contender Tournament, Semi Finals	New York City, New York	Decision (unanimous)	3	3:00	6–6
2016-02-26	Loss	(United States) Dustin Jacoby	Glory 27: Chicago - Middleweight Contender Tournament, Final	Hoffman Estates, Illinois, USA	TKO	2	1:06	6-5
For the Glory Middleweight Contender Tournament.
2016-02-26	Win	(Canada) Robert Thomas	Glory 27: Chicago - Middleweight Contender Tournament, Semi Finals	Hoffman Estates, Illinois, USA	Decision (unanimous)	3	3:00	6-4
2015-10-09	Loss	(United States) Dustin Jacoby	Glory 24: Denver	Denver, Colorado, USA	TKO (punches)	3	1:40	5-4
2015-04-03	Loss	(Canada) Simon Marcus	Glory 20: Dubai - Middleweight Contender Tournament, Semi Finals	Dubai, UAE	Decision (unanimous)	3	3:00	5-3
2014-11-07	Loss	(Netherlands) Jason Wilnis	Glory 18: Oklahoma	Oklahoma City, Oklahoma, USA	Decision (unanimous)	3	3:00	5-2
2014-06-21	Loss	(United States) Joe Schilling	Glory 17: Los Angeles - Middleweight Last Man Standing Tournament, Semi Finals	Inglewood, California, USA	Decision (split)	3	3:00	5-1
2014-06-21	Win	(Romania) Bogdan Stoica	Glory 17: Los Angeles - Middleweight Last Man Standing Tournament, Quarter Finals	Inglewood, California, USA	KO (left hook)	3	0:58	5-0
2013-11-23	Win	(United States) Joe Schilling	Glory 12: New York	New York City, New York, USA	Decision (unanimous)	3	3:00	4-0
2013-09-28	Win	(United States) Robby Plotkin	Glory 10: Los Angeles - Middleweight World Championship Tournament, Reserve Match	Ontario, California, USA	KO (right cross)	1	2:26	3-0
2013-06-22	Win	(France) Mike Lemaire	Glory 9: New York	New York City, New York, USA	KO (left hook)	2	1:12	2-0
2013-02-22	Win	(Serbia) Strahinja Ivanović	Take-On Muay Thai XIX	New York City, New York, USA	TKO (retirement)	2	2:43	1-0

Amateur kickboxing record
19 wins (15 KOs), 1 loss, 0 draws
Date	Result	Opponent	Event	Location	Method	Round	Time
2012-12-07	Win	(United States) Quinton O'Brien	Friday Night Fights	New York City, New York, USA	Decision (unanimous)	3	2:00
2011-04-29	Win	(Albania) Simon Camaj	Friday Night Fights	New York City, New York, USA	Decision (unanimous)	3	2:00
Wins the WKA Amateur United States Cruiserweight (-86 kg/189 lb) Muay Thai Championship.
2010-02-27	Win	(United States) Jessie Williams	Bangkok Fight Night V	Atlanta, Georgia, USA	TKO	2	1:10

Legend: Win Loss Draw/no contest Notes
