= Nieky Holzken =

Dutch kickboxer (born 1983)

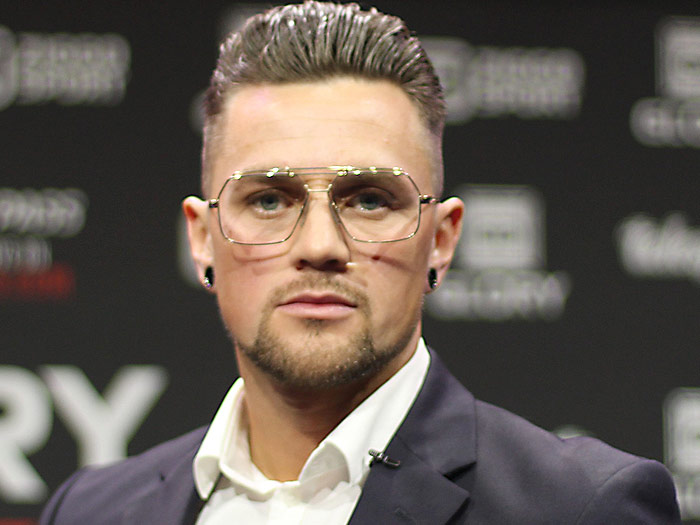
- Born: Nicolaas Hubertus Holzken; December 16, 1983 (age 42); Helmond, Netherlands
- Other names: The Natural
- Height: 6 ft 0 in (183 cm)
- Weight: 170 lb (77 kg; 12 st 2 lb)
- Division: Lightweight; Welterweight; Middleweight
- Reach: 74 in (188 cm)
- Style: Kickboxing
- Fighting out of: Helmond, Netherlands
- Team: Golden Glory (2006–2013); Team Holzken Helmond
- Trainer: Sjef Weber
- Years active: 2001–present

Professional boxing record
- Total: 17
- Wins: 15
- By knockout: 11
- Losses: 2

Kickboxing record
- Total: 114
- Wins: 95
- By knockout: 48
- Losses: 18
- By knockout: 5
- No contests: 1

Other information
- Website: http://www.niekyholzken.nl/
- Boxing record from BoxRec
- Last updated on: Juli 15, 2017

Nicolaas Hubertus Holzken (born December 16, 1983) is a Dutch retired kickboxer and professional boxer. He is the former Glory Welterweight Champion. In 2018, Holzken participated in the World Boxing Super Series as a substitute.

== Background ==
After his parents separated when he was an infant, Holzken was raised by his paternal grandparents. Inspired by martial arts movies, he started training kickboxing at the age of ten.

== Career ==
=== K-1 ===
Nieky Holzken made his K-1 debut on November 26, 2006, at K-1 World MAX North European Qualification in Stockholm, Sweden. He won the tournament by three consecutive KO's over Björn Kjöllerström, Joakim Karlsson and Elias Daniel. The win qualified him for the K-1 World MAX 2007 Final Elimination, where he was matched up against the reigning K-1 MAX champion Buakaw Por. Pramuk. He lost the fight by unanimous decision.

=== Glory ===
He faced Murat Direkçi at Glory 2: Brussels on October 6, 2012, in Brussels, Belgium and won via TKO due to a cut in the second round.

He defeated Karim Ghajji via TKO due to a cut in an extension round at Glory 6: Istanbul in Istanbul, Turkey on April 6, 2013.

He was to fight at SLAMM!! - Soema na Basi IV: Londt vs. Adegbuyi in Paramaribo, Suriname on August 8, 2013 but withdrew for undisclosed reasons.

He was initially scheduled to fight Marc de Bonte in the Glory 13: Tokyo - Welterweight World Championship Tournament semi-finals in Tokyo, Japan on December 21, 2013 but his opponent was then changed to Karapet Karapetyan who he had previously fought and beat in February 2012 by decision. He knocked Karapetyan down in rounds one and two en route to a clear unanimous decision win before facing Joseph Valtellini in the final. In a back-and-forth fight where both pressed forward, landing powerful but technical punches and kicks, Holzken scored a TKO in the dying seconds of the third and final round to be crowned the inaugural Glory World Welterweight (-77.1 kg/170 lb) Tournament Champion.

He was set to fight for the inaugural Glory Welterweight Championship against Marc de Bonte at Glory 14: Zagreb in Zagreb, Croatia on March 8, 2014 but the fight was cancelled when he suffered a shoulder injury in a car accident. The match was rescheduled for Glory 16: Denver in Broomfield, Colorado, US on May 3, 2014 but his lingering shoulder injury again forced him out, and he was replaced by Karapet Karapetyan.

On February 6, 2015, Holzken was part of a one-night, four-man welterweight tournament at Glory 19 to determine who would get the next title shot. In the semifinals, he faced Alexander Stetsurenko and won via unanimous decision. In the finals, he faced Raymond Daniels and won via TKO in the third round.

On April 16, 2016, he defeated Yoann Kongolo. After the match-up Holzken expressed his desire to in-ring commentator Joseph Valtellini that he wished to face him again.

On July 2, 2018, Holzken announced on his social media that he had rejected a contract offer from Glory and was entertaining offers from other promotions.

=== Boxing ===
Since 2013, Holzken had competed in professional boxing alongside his kickboxing career, but in February 2018 he got the biggest opportunity in the sport when he stepped in at late notice to face Callum Smith in the World Boxing Super Series super-middleweight tournament. The Dutchman was 13-0 coming in, and Smith 23-0. Smith took the win by unanimous decision, and then went on to knockout George Groves in the final.

=== ONE Championship ===
Holzken returned to kickboxing when he signed for ONE Championship, making his debut with a second round KO over Cosmo Alexandre at ONE Championship: Warrior's Dream in November 2018.

He would challenge Regian Eersel for the inaugural ONE Lightweight Kickboxing World Championship at ONE Championship: Enter the Dragon in May 2019 and lose via unanimous decision. The two would rematch for the title in October 2019 at ONE Championship: Dawn of Valor, but Holzken lost again via unanimous decision.

It was announced that Nieky Holzken would face Elliot Compton at ONE Championship: Big Bang 2 on December 11, 2020. It was also revealed that Holzken had signed a six-fight contract extension with ONE after his original contract expired. Holzken knocked Compton out in the first round, with a liver shot.

Holzken faced John Wayne Parr in a Muay Thai bout at ONE on TNT 3 on April 21, 2021. He won the bout via TKO after dropping Parr with a head kick in the second round. A mere fortnight after the bout Holzken announced that his contract had expired and he became a free agent.

On September 13, 2021, Holzken announced that he had signed a new multi-fight contract with ONE Championship.

In November 2021, Combat Press ranked him as the #5 welterweight kickboxer in the world.

As the first fight of his new six-fight contract, Holzken was scheduled to face the one-time ONE Lightweight Kickboxing title challenger Islam Murtazaev at ONE: X on March 26, 2022. With the removal of all Russian athletes from the event as a result of the 2022 Russian invasion of Ukraine, Murtazaev was replaced by Sinsamut Klinmee and the fight was changed to Muay Thai rules. He lost the fight by a second-round knockout.

Holzken was scheduled to face Islam Murtazaev at ONE 162 on October 21, 2022. However, Holzken withdrew with an injury on four days before the bout was supposed to take place.

Holzken faced Arian Sadiković at ONE Fight Night 11 on June 10, 2023. At the weigh-ins, Holzken weighed in at 176 pounds, 6 pounds over the lightweight limit. As a result, the bout proceeded as a catchweight and Holzken was fined 30% of his fight purse, which went to Sadiković. He lost the fight by unanimous decision.

Holzken faced Yoshihiro Akiyama in a special-rules bout at ONE 165 on January 28, 2024. The match, contested in MMA gloves, will be three rounds: the first round being boxing rules, the second round being Muay Thai rules, and the third round being MMA rules. Holzken won the fight by technical knockout in the first round. This win earned the $50,000 Performance of the Night awards.

On March 14, 2025, Holzken faced Sinsamut Klinmee in a highly anticipated rematch. Holzken won the fight by a 1st round knock-out after being knocked down himself only moments before. This win earned him another $50,000 Performance Bonus.

On February 8, 2026, Holzken announced he was retiring from competition.

== Personal life ==
Holzken's family and in-laws are "woonwagenbewoners", indigenous Dutch Travellers.

Holzken and his wife Nathelie have a son and a daughter.

== Titles ==
- Bloody Elbow.com
  - 2013 Fight of the Year vs. Joseph Valtellini on December 21
- Glory
  - 2013 Glory Welterweight (-77 kg/169.8 lb) World Championship Tournament Champion
  - 2015 Glory Welterweight (-77 kg/169.8 lb) Contender Tournament winner
  - Glory Welterweight (-77 kg/169.8 lb) Championship (one time; three defenses; former)
- WFCA
  - 2011 WFCA K-1 Rules Super Middleweight World champion
- SIMTA
  - 2007 SIMTA 72 kg European champion
- K-1
  - 2007 K-1 MAX North European Qualification champion
- Liver Kick.com
  - 2013 Fight of the Year vs. Joseph Valtellini on December 21
- SIMTA
  - 2005 SIMTA Light Middleweight European champion

== Kickboxing record ==
Kickboxing record
95 wins (48 (T)KOs), 18 losses, 0 draws, 1 no contest
| Date | Result | Opponent | Event | Location | Method | Round | Time | Record |
| 2025-03-14 | Win | (Thailand) Sinsamut Klinmee | ONE Friday Fights 100 | Bangkok, Thailand | KO (right hook) | 1 | 1:58 | 95-18-0 |
| 2023-06-10 | Loss | (Bosnia and Herzegovina) Arian Sadiković | ONE Fight Night 11 | Bangkok, Thailand | Decision (unanimous) | 3 | 3:00 | 94-18-0 |
| 2022-03-26 | Loss | (Thailand) Sinsamut Klinmee | ONE: X | Kallang, Singapore | KO (punch) | 2 | 1:39 | 94-17-0 |
| 2021-04-21 | Win | (Australia) John Wayne Parr | ONE on TNT 3 | Kallang, Singapore | TKO (head kick) | 2 | 1:23 | 94-16-0 |
| 2020-12-11 | Win | (Australia) Elliot Compton | ONE Championship: Big Bang 2 | Kallang, Singapore | KO (liver punch) | 1 | 1:36 | 93-16-0 |
| 2019-10-26 | Loss | (Suriname) Regian Eersel | ONE Championship: Dawn Of Valor | Jakarta, Indonesia | Decision (unanimous) | 5 | 3:00 | 92-16-0 |
For the ONE Kickboxing Lightweight title
| 2019-05-17 | Loss | (Suriname) Regian Eersel | ONE Championship 96: Enter the Dragon | Kallang, Singapore | Decision (unanimous) | 5 | 3:00 | 92-15-0 |
For the inaugural ONE Kickboxing Lightweight title
| 2019-02-22 | Win | (Morocco) Mustapha Haida | ONE Championship 90: Call to Greatness | Kallang, Singapore | Decision (unanimous) | 3 | 3:00 | 92-14-0 |
| 2018-11-17 | Win | (Brazil) Cosmo Alexandre | ONE Championship 84: Warrior's Dream | Jakarta, Indonesia | KO (uppercut) | 2 | 2:59 | 91-14-0 |
| 2017-12-09 | Loss | (Azerbaijan) Alim Nabiev | Glory 49: Rotterdam | Rotterdam, Netherlands | Decision (unanimous) | 3 | 3:00 | 90-14-0 |
| 2017-06-10 | Loss | (Cameroon) Cédric Doumbé | Glory 42: Paris | Paris, France | Decision (split) | 5 | 3:00 | 90-13-0 |
For Glory Welterweight Championship
| 2016-12-10 | Loss | (Cameroon) Cédric Doumbé | Glory: Collision | Oberhausen, Germany | Decision (split) | 5 | 3:00 | 90-12-0 |
Lost Glory Welterweight Championship
| 2016-10-21 | Win | (Netherlands) Murthel Groenhart | Glory 34: Denver | Broomfield, Colorado | Decision (unanimous) | 5 | 3:00 | 90-11-0 |
Defends Glory Welterweight Championship.
| 2016-04-16 | Win | (Switzerland) Yoann Kongolo | Glory 29: Copenhagen | Copenhagen, Denmark | Decision (unanimous) | 5 | 3:00 | 88-11-0 |
Defends Glory Welterweight Championship.
| 2015-12-04 | Win | (Netherlands) Murthel Groenhart | Glory 26: Amsterdam | Amsterdam, Netherlands | Decision (split) | 5 | 3:00 | 87-11-0 |
Defends Glory Welterweight Championship.
| 2015-08-07 | Win | (United States) Raymond Daniels | Glory 23: Las Vegas | Las Vegas, Nevada, USA | TKO (right knee cut) | 3 | 1:36 | 86-11-0 |
Wins vacant Glory Welterweight Championship.
| 2015-02-06 | Win | (United States) Raymond Daniels | Glory 19: Virginia | Hampton, Virginia, USA | TKO (4 knockdowns) | 3 | 1:25 | 85-11-0 |
Wins Glory Welterweight Contender Tournament Final.
| 2015-02-06 | Win | (Russia) Alexander Stetsurenko | Glory 19: Virginia | Hampton, Virginia, USA | Decision (unanimous) | 3 | 3:00 | 84-11-0 |
Wins Glory Welterweight Contender Tournament Semi Finals
| 2014-12-25 | Win | (Turkey) Yusuf Karakaya | One Shot World Series | Antalya, Turkey | TKO (referee stoppage) | 1 | 2:05 | 83-11-0 |
| 2013-12-21 | Win | (Canada) Joseph Valtellini | Glory 13: Tokyo | Tokyo, Japan | TKO (right hook) | 3 | 3:00 | 82-11-0 |
Wins Glory Welterweight World Championship Tournament Final
| 2013-12-21 | Win | (Armenia) Karapet Karapetyan | Glory 13: Tokyo | Tokyo, Japan | Decision (unanimous) | 3 | 3:00 | 81-11-0 |
Wins Glory Welterweight Contender Tournament Semi Finals
| 2013-04-06 | Win | (Morocco) Karim Ghajji | Glory 6: Istanbul | Istanbul, Turkey | TKO (cut) | 4 | | 80-11-0 |
| 2012-10-06 | Win | (Turkey) Murat Direkçi | Glory 2: Brussels | Brussels, Belgium | TKO (cut) | 2 | | 79-11-0 |
| 2012-09-02 | Loss | (Morocco) L'houcine Ouzgni | Muay Thai Mania V | The Hague, Netherlands | Extra R. decision | 4 | 3:00 | 78-11-0 |
| 2012-05-26 | Win | (Sweden) Alex Tobiasson Harris | Glory 1: Stockholm | Stockholm, Sweden | TKO (3 knockdowns/liver shots) | 2 | 2:42 | 78-10-0 |
| 2012-03-23 | Win | (Georgia (country)) Davit Kiria | United Glory 15: World Series 2012 | Moscow, Russia | Decision | 3 | 3:00 | 77-10-0 |
| 2012-02-12 | Win | (Armenia) Karapet Karapetyan | Natural Powers | Eindhoven, Netherlands | Decision | 5 | 3:00 | 76-10-0 |
Defends WFCA K-1 Rules World Super Middleweight (-76.20 kg) title
| 2011-12-23 | Win | (United States) Cyrus Washington | Klaar Om Te Bossen 3 | Paramaribo, Suriname | TKO (cut) | 2 | | |
| 2011-11-06 | Win | (United States) Ky Hollenbeck | Muay Thai Premier League: Round 3 | The Hague, Netherlands | Decision (unanimous) | 3 | 3:00 | |
| 2011-09-02 | Win | (Suriname) Marco Piqué | Muaythai Premier League: Round 1 | Long Beach, California, USA | Decision | 3 | 3:00 | |
| 2011-05-28 | Loss | (Ukraine) Artur Kyshenko | United Glory 14: 2010-2011 World Series Finals | Moscow, Russia | Decision (unanimous) | 3 | 3:00 | |
| 2011-03-19 | Win | (France) Carlos Tavares | United Glory 13: 2010-2011 World Series Semifinals | Charleroi, Belgium | KO (punches) | 1 | 2:04 | |
| 2011-02-27 | Win | (Germany) Thilo Schneider | Kickboxgala Golden Glory Helmond, Sporthal Haagdijk | Eindhoven, Netherlands | TKO (corner stoppage) | 2 | 3:00 | |
Wins the WFCA K-1 Rules World Super Middleweight (-76.20 kg) title
| 2010-10-16 | Win | (Suriname) Murthel Groenhart | United Glory 12: 2010-2011 World Series Quarterfinals | Amsterdam, Netherlands | Ext. R decision | 4 | 3:00 | |
| 2010-09-12 | Loss | (Morocco) L'houcine Ouzgni | Fightingstars presents: It's Showtime 2010 | Amsterdam, Netherlands | KO (left flying knee) | 1 | 0:53 | |
| 2010-06-19 | Win | (Germany) Cagri Ermis | A1 World Combat Cup | Eindhoven, Netherlands | Decision | 3 | 3:00 | |
| 2010-05-29 | Win | (Brazil) Cosmo Alexandre | It's Showtime 2010 Amsterdam | Amsterdam, Netherlands | Decision (4-1) | 3 | 3:00 | |
| 2010-04-10 | Win | (Belgium) Mourad Salhi | Star Muaythai V | Maastricht, Netherlands | Ext R. decision | 4 | 3:00 | |
| 2010-01-30 | Win | (Netherlands) Leroy Kaestner | Beast of the East | Zutphen, Netherlands | Decision (unanimous) | 3 | 3:00 | |
| 2009-12-06 | Win | (Morocco) Mohammed Medhar | GGH Gala | Helmond, Netherlands | Decision (unanimous) | 3 | 3:00 | |
| 2009-10-17 | Win | (Morocco) Faldir Chahbari | Ultimate Glory 11: A Decade of Fights | Amsterdam, Netherlands | Extr R. decision (unanimous) | 4 | 3:00 | |
| 2009-07-13 | Loss | (Thailand) Buakaw Por.Pramuk | K-1 World MAX 2009 Final 8 | Tokyo, Japan | Decision (unanimous) | 3 | 3:00 | |
| 2009-04-21 | Win | (Morocco) Chahid Oulad El Hadj | K-1 World MAX 2009 Final 16 | Fukuoka, Japan | Decision (majority) | 3 | 3:00 | |
| 2008-11-30 | Win | (Suriname) Marco Pique | SLAMM "Nederland vs Thailand V" | Almere, Netherlands | KO (left hook) | 3 | 2:56 | |
| 2008-10-01 | Win | (South Africa) Virgil Kalakoda | K-1 World MAX 2008 Final | Tokyo, Japan | KO (right hook) | 1 | 1:42 | |
| 2008-07-06 | Win | (Netherlands) William Diender | Ultimate Glory 9 | Nijmegen, Netherlands | KO (left body shot) | 4 | 0:47 | |
| 2008-05-31 | Win | (Portugal) José Reis | Beast of the East 2008 | Zutphen, Netherlands | Decision (unanimous) | 5 | 3:00 | |
| 2008-04-26 | Win | (Netherlands) Joerie Mes | K-1 World GP 2008 in Amsterdam | Amsterdam, Netherlands | KO (spinning back kick) | 2 | 2:21 | |
| 2008-03-15 | Win | (Morocco) Karim El Jouharti | It's Showtime 75MAX Trophy 2008, Super Fight | 's-Hertogenbosch, Netherlands | Decision (unanimous) | 3 | 3:00 | |
| 2008-01-26 | Loss | (Cape Verde) Alviar Lima | Beast of the East | Zutphen, Netherlands | KO (left hook) | 3 | 0:36 | |
For WFCA World Thaiboxing Middleweight (-72.57 kg) title
| 2007-11-24 | Loss | (Netherlands) Andy Souwer | Shootboxing in the Autotron | Rosmalen, Netherlands | Decision (unanimous) | 3 | 3:00 | |
| 2007-10-27 | Win | (Thailand) Lamsongkram Chuwattana | SLAMM "One Night in Bangkok" | Antwerp, Belgium | Decision (unanimous) | 3 | 3:00 | |
| 2007-09-09 | Win | (Syria) Baker Barakat | Ultimate Glory 5 | Amersfoort, Netherlands | Decision (unanimous) | 3 | 3:00 | |
| 2007-06-28 | Loss | (Thailand) Buakaw Por. Pramuk | K-1 World MAX 2007 Final Elimination | Tokyo, Japan | Decision (unanimous) | 3 | 3:00 | |
| 2007-05-13 | Win | (Belgium) Marijn Geuens | Fight Night in Veghel | Veghel, Netherlands | KO (spinning back kick) | | | |
| 2007-04-07 | Win | (Belarus) Ruslan Kaladko | Balans Fight Night | Tilburg, Netherlands | Decision (unanimous) | 3 | 3:00 | |
| 2007-01-21 | Win | (Germany) Steve Neumann | Ultimate Glory 2 | Amersfoort, Netherlands | KO (left uppercut) | 1 | | |
| 2006-11-24 | Win | (Sweden) Elias Daniel | K-1 World MAX North European Qualification 2007 | Stockholm, Sweden | KO (left body shot) | 3 | 0:50 | |
Wins K-1 World MAX North European Qualification 2007 tournament title
| 2006-11-24 | Win | (Sweden) Joakim Karlsson | K-1 World MAX North European Qualification 2007 | Stockholm, Sweden | KO (straight right punch) | 1 | 0:34 | |
| 2006-11-24 | Win | (Sweden) Björn Kjöllerström | K-1 World MAX North European Qualification 2007 | Stockholm, Sweden | KO (right hook) | 1 | 2:20 | |
| 2006-09-23 | Win | (Belgium) Jan van Denderen | It's Showtime 75MAX Trophy Final 2006, Reserve Fight | Rotterdam, Netherlands | Decision (unanimous) | 3 | 3:00 | |
| 2006-03-26 | Win | (Suriname) Terence Oosterling | West Point Fight II | Tilburg, Netherlands | KO (left cross) | 1 | 0:10 | |
| 2006-03-05 | Win | (Netherlands) Travers Schlee | Future Battle | Bergen op Zoom, Netherlands | TKO | | | |
| 2005-12-17 | Win | (Turkey) Ferhat Atasoy | WFCA Gala "The Eye of the Tiger" | Arnhem, Netherlands | KO | | | |
| 2005-10-30 | Loss | (Netherlands) Donald Berner | It's Showtime 75MAX Trophy Alkmaar, Pool B Semi Finals | Alkmaar, Netherlands | Ext R. decision (unanimous) | 4 | 3:00 | |
| 2005-09-25 | Win | (England) Daniel Hudson | | Manchester, England | KO (straight right punch) | 1 | 1:01 | |
Wins SIMTA Muaythai European title
| 2005-06-18 | Win | (Netherlands) Melvin van Leeuwaarde | Showdome IV | Amsterdam, Netherlands | KO | | | |
| 2005-04-30 | Win | (Turkey) Ömer Tekin | Queens Fight Night | Eindhoven, Netherlands | TKO (corner stoppage) | 1 | | |
| 2005-02-27 | Win | (England) Richard Jones | Master Sken's Fight Night | Manchester, England | KO (straight right punch) | 2 | 1:06 | |
| 2004-12-12 | Win | (Turkey) Servet Cakir | Face to Face 2nd Edition, Final | Apeldoorn, Netherlands | Decision (unanimous) | 5 | 2:00 | |
Wins M.O.N Dutch Open Amateur tournament (-71kg) title
| 2004-12-12 | Win | (Turkey) Felat Atasoy | Face to Face 2nd Edition, Semi Final | Apeldoorn, Netherlands | Decision (unanimous) | 4 | 2:00 | |
| 2004-12-12 | Win | (France) Radju Ramdjilal | Face to Face 2nd Edition, Quarter Final | Apeldoorn, Netherlands | KO | | | |
| 2004-09-04 | Loss | (Denmark) Henrik Nygaard | Valhalla 2004 Battle of the Vikings | Aarhus, Denmark | KO | 4 | | |
| 2004-03-27 | Win | (United States) Steven Berkolayko | WPKL Muay Thai Champions League XIII | Rotterdam, Netherlands | Decision (unanimous) | 5 | 2:00 | |
| 2004-02-21 | NC | (Turkey) Mesut Acikyol | Test of Talent Reloaded III | Mortsel, Belgium | No contest | 5 | | |
| 2004-02-20 | Win | (England) Richard Jones | Master Sken's Fight Night | Manchester, England | TKO | 4 | | |
| 2004-02-01 | Win | (Belgium) Nico Lombaerts | Thai-Kickboxing Gala | Valkenswaard, Netherlands | KO (low kicks) | 1 | | |
| 2003-12-19 | Win | (Morocco) Ali Moftagari | Gala in Kampen | Kampen, Netherlands | KO | | | |
| 2003-06-29 | Loss | (Netherlands) Frank Sonders | Dutch Muay Thai Championships | Rotterdam, Netherlands | Decision (unanimous) | 5 | 2:00 | |
| 2002-11-17 | Loss | (Netherlands) Wesley Robijn | Jellema promotion, Sporthal "De Wetering" | Houten, Netherlands | KO | | | |
| 2002-10-06 | Win | (Netherlands) Dennis Rooy | WFCA Gala in Nijmegen | Nijmegen, Netherlands | Decision (unanimous) | 2 | 2:00 | |
| 2002-04-13 | Win | (Iran) Reza Rahimpour | TB Den Haag promotion, Fairtex Thaiboksgala | The Hague, Netherlands | TKO | 2 | | |
Legend: Win Loss Draw/no contest Notes

== Professional boxing record ==
| 17 fights | 15 wins | 2 losses |
|---|---|---|
| By knockout | 11 | 0 |
| By decision | 4 | 2 |

| No. | Result | Record | Opponent | Type | Round | Date | Location | Notes |
|---|---|---|---|---|---|---|---|---|
| 17 | Loss | 15-2 | (Germany) Besir Ay | UD | 12 (12) | 07 Feb 2026 | Veka Sportcentrum, Helmond, Netherlands | For vacant WBF super middleweight title |
| 16 | Win | 15–1 | (Albania) Edison Demaj | UD | 10 (10) | 12 Jul 2025 | Veka Sportcentrum, Helmond, Netherlands | Won vacant WBF Intercontinental super middleweight title |
| 15 | Win | 14–1 | (Germany) Bernard Donfack | TKO | 3 (8) | 28 Apr 2018 | Baden-Arena, Offenburg, Baden-Württemberg, Germany | |
| 14 | Loss | 13–1 | (United Kingdom) Callum Smith | UD | 12 | 24 Feb 2018 | Arena Nürnberger Versicherung, Nuremberg, Germany | For WBC Diamond super middleweight title; World Boxing Super Series: super-middleweight semi-final |
| 13 | Win | 13–0 | (Ukraine) Viktor Polyakov | TKO | 2 (10) | 3 Feb 2018 | Sportschool Golden Glory, Helmond, Netherlands | |
| 12 | Win | 12–0 | (Germany) Cagri Ermis | KO | 3 (10) | 1 Apr 2017 | Sportschool Golden Glory, Helmond, Netherlands | |
| 11 | Win | 11–0 | (Belgium) Matingu Kindele | UD | 10 | 9 Jul 2016 | Sportschool Golden Glory, Helmond, Netherlands | Retained BeNeLux super middleweight title |
| 10 | Win | 10–0 | (Netherlands) Farouk Daku | UD | 10 | 20 Feb 2016 | Sportschool Golden Glory, Helmond, Netherlands | Won vacant BeNeLux super middleweight title |
| 9 | Win | 9–0 | (Turkey) Yesilat Berkta | KO | 2 (6) | 11 Nov 2015 | Update Disco, Meppen, Germany | |
| 8 | Win | 8–0 | (Belgium) Ahmed El Ghoulbzouri | PTS | 6 | 6 Jun 2015 | Sporthal Genderbeemd, Eindhoven, Netherlands | |
| 7 | Win | 7–0 | (Georgia (country)) Mikheil Khutsishvili | KO | 3 (8) | 19 Apr 2015 | Sportschool Golden Glory, Helmond, Netherlands | |
| 6 | Win | 6–0 | (Ukraine) Ruslan Shchelev | KO | 6 (8) | 12 Oct 2014 | Sportschool Golden Glory, Helmond, Netherlands | |
| 5 | Win | 5–0 | (Germany) Ismael Altintas | TKO | 2 (6) | 13 Jul 2014 | Sportschool Golden Glory, Helmond, Netherlands | |
| 4 | Win | 4–0 | (Georgia (country)) Gary Abajyan | TKO | 3 (6) | 14 Oct 2013 | Theater Carré, Amsterdam, Netherlands | |
| 3 | Win | 3–0 | (Germany) Philipp Kolodziej | TKO | 2 (6) | 21 Sep 2013 | Sportschool Golden Glory, Helmond, Netherlands | |
| 2 | Win | 2–0 | (Turkey) Ata Dogan | TKO | 1 (4) | 6 Jul 2013 | Sportschool Golden Glory, Helmond, Netherlands | |
| 1 | Win | 1–0 | (Germany) Anatolij Baron | KO | 2 (4) | 3 Mar 2013 | Sportschool Golden Glory, Helmond, Netherlands | |

== Special rules record ==
Professional record breakdown
| 1 match | 1 win | 0 losses |
| By knockout | 1 | 0 |

| Res. | Record | Opponent | Method | Event | Date | Round | Time | Location | Notes |
|---|---|---|---|---|---|---|---|---|---|
| Win | 1–0 | Yoshihiro Akiyama | TKO (punches) | ONE 165 | January 28, 2024 | 1 | 1:40 | Tokyo, Japan | Catchweight (187.25 lb) bout. Three-minute rounds alternating between Boxing, Muay Thai and MMA rules. Performance of the Night. |

== See also ==
- List of male kickboxers
- List of K-1 champions
