= Joseph Valtellini =

Canadian kickboxer (born 1985)

- Born: Joseph John Valtellini; May 3, 1985 (age 41); Scarborough, Ontario, Canada
- Other names: Bazooka Joe
- Height: 5 ft 11 in (180 cm)
- Weight: 170 lb (77 kg; 12 st 2 lb)
- Division: Middleweight; Super Middleweight
- Reach: 75 in (191 cm)
- Style: Taekwondo, Muay Thai, Kickboxing
- Fighting out of: Toronto, Ontario, Canada
- Team: Ultimate Martial Arts
- Trainer: Paul Minhas
- Rank: 2nd dan black belt in Taekwondo; Blue belt in Brazilian Jiu-Jitsu
- Years active: 2008–2015

Kickboxing record
- Total: 14
- Wins: 12
- By knockout: 10
- Losses: 2
- By knockout: 1
- Draws: 0

Amateur record
- Total: 11
- Wins: 11
- By knockout: 4
- Losses: 0
- Draws: 0

Other information
- Occupation: Teacher, Color commentator
- Notable school: Sir William Osler High School
- Last updated on: June 21, 2014

Joseph John Valtellini (born May 3, 1985) is a Canadian retired Muay Thai kickboxer who competed in the super middleweight division. Nicknamed "Bazooka Joe", Valtellini is a strong and explosive fighter possessing considerable punching power and powerful low kicks. After winning provincial and national honours as an amateur, he turned professional in 2010 and went undefeated while finishing all of his opponents on the New York Muay Thai scene over the next two years before losing to Grégory Choplin in Lion Fight. He debuted with the Glory promotion in April 2013 and went on to win the Glory Welterweight Championship in June 2014. He retired the following year due to post-concussion syndrome and now works as a commentator for the promotion.

== Early life ==
An Italian Canadian, Joseph Valtellini was born in Scarborough, Ontario, to parents who emigrated from Pachino, Sicily. He began training in Taekwondo under Roy Sullivan at the Ki Do Kwan gym aged seven and earned his black belt at ten. He was promoted to the rank of second degree black belt at the age of fourteen, but around the age of seventeen he began looking for more "contact and realism" in martial arts and started training in Brazilian jiu-jitsu. It was not until he was nineteen that he found Muay Thai. He trained both styles for couple of years until he dropped jiu-jitsu after he decided to become a full-time striker.

Valtellini played association football competitively between the ages of ten and eighteen and unsuccessfully tried out for the Toronto Varsity Blues soccer team while attending the University of Toronto, although he did make it on to the Toronto Varsity Blues Canadian football team where he played for five years, serving as the placekicker and finishing two seasons as the team's leading scorer. He suffered a broken radius in his left arm while playing Canadian football, requiring surgery and prompting doctors to recommend never fighting again. In addition to his fighting career, he also works as a physical education teacher for special needs students at Sir William Osler High School.

== Career ==
=== Early career (2008–2012) ===
Valtellini first came to prominence when he won the Canadian Amateur Muay Thai Association of Ontario (CAMTAO) Amateur Ontario Super Middleweight Championship in 2008. In July 2009, he participated in the 2009 IKF World Classic in Orlando, Florida, United States, winning the tournament in the light middleweight (-72.72 kg/160 lb) Muay Thai division. After defeating Jaried Gonzalez via technical knockout in the quarter-finals, he took unanimous decision wins over Eric Ingram and Brian Robertson in the semis and final, respectively, to be crowned champion. He then won the Council of Amateur Sport Kickboxing (CASK) Canadian amateur middleweight title in early 2010 before turning professional.

As Muay Thai was illegal in the province of Ontario until August 2010, Valtellini began his professional career in the US, finding success in the New York City-based Friday Night Fights promotion. In his pro debut on May 14, 2010, he faced sanshou stylist Max Chen. After scoring a knockdown with a left hook, Valtellini kept up the pressure and forced the referee to stop the fight towards the end of the first round. In his next two outings, he stopped both Dorian Price and Sean Hinds with low kicks. Having gone 3–0 with three stoppages in his first year as a pro, he was nominated for the 2010 "North American Fighter of the Year" award by Muay Thai Authority but lost out to Kevin Ross.

On April 29, 2011, he beat the previously undefeated Ben Case. Although he struggled with Case's height and reach early, he was able cause damage with punch-low kick combinations and dropped Case at the end of the fourth round before finishing him with a high kick in the fifth. With this win, he claimed the #10 spot in North America's pound for pound rankings. Headlining for the first time against Alex Berrios on September 23, 2011, Valtellini was able to avoid the clinch and use effective low kicks which caused Berrios to quit on his stool in between rounds two and three. After the fight, he moved up three places in the North American rankings.

Moving up from his usual weight of 75 kg/165 lb, he faced Shawn Yarborough in a 76 kg/169 lb catch weight on March 9, 2012. This was also his first fight with elbows as the state of New York had only made them legal four months earlier. Valtellini sent Yarborough to the canvas with a right hand but he was able to beat the count. Shortly afterwards, he cornered Yarborough and became the first man to stop him when he knocked him out with a left hook-right uppercut combo.

Having established himself as the top super middleweight on the continent, Valtellini took his first fight outside of New York against Grégory Choplin in the co-main event of Lion Fight 7 in Las Vegas, Nevada on October 13, 2012. He struggled with his French opponent's clinch and elbows, receiving a cut over his left eye in the first round. Going the distance for the first time in his career, he dropped a unanimous decision. He rebounded with a unanimous points victory over Mehdi Baghdad at Muay Thai in America: In Honor of the King in Los Angeles, California, on December 1, 2012.

=== Glory (2013–2015) ===
In December 2012, he signed with Glory to fight under Oriental kickboxing rules in the organization's 77 kg/170 lb welterweight division. He made his promotional debut against Murat Direkçi at Glory 6: Istanbul in Istanbul, Turkey on April 6, 2013, and overcame the Belgian-Turk's aggressive start by scoring a knockdown late in the opening round. After dropping him twice more inside the last thirty seconds of round two, Valtellini forced Direkçi's corner to throw in the towel in three.

He returned to New York to face François Ambang at Glory 9: New York on June 22, 2013. After a close first round in which both fighters landed solid combinations and kicks, Valtellini began to take control in the second. In round three, it became evident that Ambang's lead leg was injured and Valtellini went on the attack to score a knockdown with low kicks. Ambang was able to get back to his feet but could not walk towards the referee and the fight was called, giving the Canadian the win.

He improved to 3–0 in Glory with a late stoppage of Karim Ghajji at Glory 11: Chicago in Hoffman Estates, Illinois, United States on October 12, 2013. After a technical affair that saw both men exchanging and looking extremely solid, Valtellini rocked Ghajji with a spinning back fist in round three which forced the referee to issue a standing eight count. Valtellini then swarmed on the Frenchman, landing a high kick which caused a TKO victory.

He was initially set to fight Karapet Karapetyan in the Glory 13: Tokyo - Welterweight World Championship Tournament semi-finals in Tokyo, Japan on December 21, 2013 but Karapetyan was replaced by Raymond Daniels when the match-ups were changed for undisclosed reasons. He struggled with Daniels' unorthodox karate style early on but by round two began to do damage with low kicks before he scored a high kick KO in round three, inflicting the first loss on Daniels' record. Facing Nieky Holzken in the final, both fighters pressed forward, landing powerful but technical punches and kicks throughout. Holzken hurt Valtellini with a body shot in the third and final round before putting him away after landing a right overhand in a hectic exchange in the dying seconds of the fight.

Valtellini beat Marc de Bonte via unanimous decision to take his Glory Welterweight Championship at Glory 17: Los Angeles in Inglewood, California, US on June 21, 2014. Both fighters scored knockdowns in the fight; Valtellini dropped de Bonte with a high kick in round three, while de Bonte floored Valtellini with a knee in round four. After almost a year of inactivity, Valtellini vacated the title on June 4, 2015, due to suffering from post-concussion syndrome.

== Post-fighting career ==
After his retirement, Valtellini joined the Glory commentary team and debuted as an analyst at Glory 23 on August 7, 2015. He re-signed with the company on a multiple-year deal in February 2017. He has also co-hosted the GLORY Kickboxing Podcast, which debuted in November 2016, with Todd Grisham.

Valtellini was a guest on The Joe Rogan Experience in January 2017.

He appeared in a minor role in the 2016 film Kickboxer: Vengeance.

== Championships and awards ==
=== Kickboxing ===
- Bloody Elbow.com
  - 2013 Fight of the Year vs. Nieky Holzken on December 21
- Canadian Amateur Muay Thai Association of Ontario
  - CAMTAO Amateur Ontario Super Middleweight Championship
- Council of Amateur Sport Kickboxing
  - CASK Amateur Canadian Middleweight Championship
- Glory
  - Glory Hall of Fame (2021)
  - 2013 Glory Welterweight (-77 kg/169.8 lb) World Championship Tournament Runner-up
  - Glory Welterweight (-77 kg/169.8 lb) Championship (One time)
- International Kickboxing Federation
  - 2009 IKF World Classic Light Middleweight (-72.72 kg/160.3 lb) Muay Thai Championship
- Liver Kick.com
  - 2013 Fight of the Year vs. Nieky Holzken on December 21
- Muay Thai Authority.com
  - 2013 North American Breakthrough Fighter of the Year

== Kickboxing record ==
12 wins (10 KOs), 2 losses, 0 draws
Date	Result	Opponent	Event	Location	Method	Round	Time	Record
2014-06-21	Win	(Belgium) Marc de Bonte	Glory 17: Los Angeles	Los Angeles, California, US	Decision (unanimous)	5	3:00	12-2
Wins the Glory Welterweight World Championship.
2013-12-21	Loss	(Netherlands) Nieky Holzken	Glory 13: Tokyo - World Welterweight Championship Tournament, Final	Ariake Coliseum Tokyo, Japan	TKO (right hook)	3	3:00	11-2
2013-12-21	Win	(United States) Raymond Daniels	Glory 13: Tokyo - World Welterweight Championship Tournament, Semifinals	Ariake Coliseum Tokyo, Japan	KO (right high kick)	3	1:20	11-1
2013-10-12	Win	(Morocco) Karim Ghajji	Glory 11: Chicago	Hoffman Estates, Illinois, US	TKO (punches and right high kick)	3	2:53	10-1
2013-06-22	Win	(Cameroon) François Ambang	Glory 9: New York	New York City, New York, US	TKO (right low kick)	3	1:24	9-1
2013-04-06	Win	(Turkey) Murat Direkçi	Glory 6: Istanbul	Istanbul, Turkey	TKO (corner stoppage)	3	0:27	8-1
2012-12-01	Win	(France) Mehdi Baghdad	Muay Thai in America: In Honor of the King	Los Angeles, California, US	Decision (unanimous)	5	3:00	7-1
2012-10-13	Loss	(France) Grégory Choplin	Lion Fight 7	Las Vegas, Nevada, US	Decision (unanimous)	5	3:00	6-1
2012-03-09	Win	(United States) Shawn Yarborough	Friday Night Fights	New York City, New York, US	KO (left hook and right uppercut)	1	2:55	6-0
2011-09-23	Win	(United States) Alex Berrios	Friday Night Fights	New York City, New York, US	TKO (retirement)	2	3:00	5-0
2011-04-29	Win	(United States) Ben Case	Friday Night Fights	New York City, New York, US	TKO (high kick)	5	0:53	4-0
2010-12-10	Win	(United States) Sean Hinds	Friday Night Fights	New York City, New York, US	TKO (retirement)	3	3:00	3-0
2010-07-22	Win	(United States) Dorian Price	Friday Night Fights	New York City, New York, US	TKO (low kicks)			2-0
2010-05-14	Win	(United States) Max Chen	Friday Night Fights	New York City, New York, US	TKO (right high kick)	1	2:11	1-0

Amateur kickboxing record
Date	Result	Opponent	Event	Location	Method	Round	Time
2009-07-26	Win	(United States) Brian Robertson	2009 IKF World Classic, Final	Orlando, Florida, US	Decision (unanimous)	3	2:00
Wins the 2009 IKF World Classic Light Middleweight (-72.72 kg/160 lb) Muay Thai Championship.
2009-07-26	Win	(United States) Eric Ingram	2009 IKF World Classic, Semi Finals	Orlando, Florida, US	Decision (unanimous)	3	2:00
2009-07-25	Win	(United States) Jaried Gonzalez	2009 IKF World Classic, Quarter Finals	Orlando, Florida, US	TKO	2	1:40

Legend: Win Loss Draw/No contest Notes
