= Jason Wilnis =

Dutch kickboxer (born 1990)

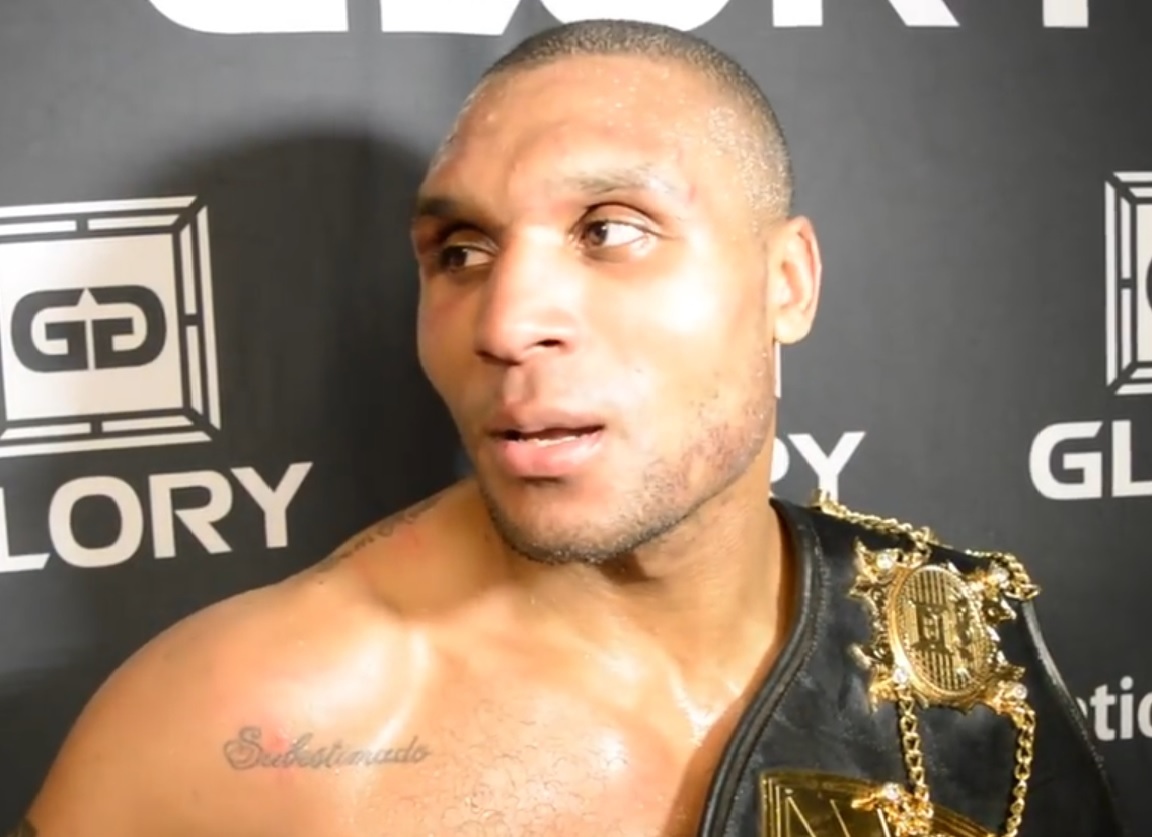
- Dutch kickboxer Jason Wilnis
- Born: Jason Wilnis; December 10, 1990 (age 35), Utrecht, Netherlands
- Other names: Psycho; Tyson
- Height: 1.83 m (6 ft 0 in)
- Weight: 85 kg (187 lb; 13.4 st)
- Division: Middleweight
- Reach: 73.1 in (186 cm)
- Style: Kickboxing, Muay Thai
- Fighting out of: Utrecht, Netherlands
- Team: The Colosseum Gym
- Trainer: Danny de Vries, Daan Kortland

Kickboxing record
- Total: 44
- Wins: 31
- By knockout: 8
- Losses: 12
- By knockout: 1
- Draws: 1

Mixed martial arts record
- Total: 5
- Wins: 2
- By knockout: 1
- By decision: 1
- Losses: 3
- By knockout: 2
- By decision: 1

Other information
- Notable relatives: Jahfarr Wilnis, Denzel Dumfries
- Mixed martial arts record from Sherdog
- Last updated on: 11 April 2022

Jason Wilnis (born 10 December 1990) is a Dutch professional mixed martial artist and former kickboxer competing in the middleweight division. He is the last It's Showtime 85MAX champion and a former Glory Middleweight Champion. Notably, he holds wins in kickboxing against mixed martial artists and former UFC Middleweight Champion Israel Adesanya and current UFC Light Heavyweight Champion Alex Pereira.

He was ranked in the middleweight top ten by Combat Press between September 2014 and July 2021, peaking at #1 between October 2016 and May 2017.

== Biography and career ==
=== Early career and It's Showtime title win ===
Wilnis was born in Utrecht, Netherlands to Surinamese parents. He was keen football player until he followed his older brother, Jahfarr Wilnis to The Colosseum Gym in Utrecht to train kickboxing at the age of 17. He had his first fight not long after he started training.

When Sahak Parparyan vacated his It's Showtime title, Jason jumped in and challenged Alex Pereira on 10 November 2012 for the It's Showtime 85MAX championship in São Paulo Brazil at It's Showtime 60 event, becoming last It's Showtime champion by 2nd-round TKO. He dropped Pereira three times in round with low kicks.

On 28 September 2013 he participated in Glory 10: Los Angeles - Middleweight World Championship Tournament, losing in the semi-finals to Artem Levin by judges unanimous decision.

He fought Sahak Parparyan in the semi-finals of the Glory 14: Zagreb - Middleweight Contender Tournament in Zagreb, Croatia on March 8, 2014, losing by split decision after three even rounds.

=== Glory Middleweight Contender tournament ===
He was expected to face Miroslav Cingel at FFC11: Sanchez vs. Bekavac on April 4, 2014, but replaced with Sahak Parparyan because of back injury. He next fought Tomáš Šenkýr at Gibu Fight Night, winning the fight by unanimous decision. Returning to Glory, Wilnis was scheduled to fight the #2 ranked Wayne Barrett at Glory 18. Wilnis won the fight by unanimous decision. He next took part in the 2015 Glory Middleweight Contender tournament, held during the Glory 20: Dubai event. He won the semifinal bout against Alex Pereira by unanimous decision, but lost the final against Simon Marcus by split decision.

Moving briefly away from Glory, he fought David Keclik at FFC 19 - Linz. He won the fight by TKO, after Keclik retired at the end of the second round.

=== Glory Middleweight title reign ===
In his next fight, Wilnis fought Joe Schilling in a GLORY Middleweight title eliminator, coming into the fight as heavy underdog. Schilling won the fight by TKO due to injury, as Wilnis was forced to withdraw due to a broken toe. He rebounded from this loss with a majority decision win against Wang Chongyang at Kunlun Fight 37. He then fought Filip Verlinden at Glory 28: Paris, and won by unanimous decision. At Glory 30: Los Angeles, he fought a rematch with Joe Schilling, whom he beat by majority decision.

This three fight winning streak earned Winis the chance to challenge Simon Marcus for the Glory Middleweight championship at Glory 33. Despite a slow start to the fight, Wilnis began to take over as the fight went on and won the fight by TKO in the third round, managing to knock Marcus down three times in the third round.

For his first title defense, Wilnis was scheduled to fight Israel Adesanya at Glory 37. Wilnis won the fight by unanimous decision (49–46, 48–47, 48–47), although the fight results were considered controversial by many media members.

For his second title defense, Wilnis was scheduled to fight a trilogy match with Simon Marcus at Glory 40: Copenhagen. He lost the fight by split decision.

=== Post title reign ===
Wilnis' losing streak extended, as he lost the next two fights as well, losing by TKO to Yousri Belgaroui and losing by split decision to Simon Marcus. He arrested the losing streak with a third-round TKO of Jacob Rodriguez at Glory 63.

He then fought Alex Pereira at Glory 65 for the Glory Middleweight Championship. He lost the fight a flying knee knockout, which was later named by Combat Press as the 2019 "Knockout of the Year".

Wilnis then fought Donovan Wisse at Glory 70: Lyon. He lost the fight by unanimous decision. His losing streak extended to three, as he lost to Vladimir Idranyi by unanimous decision.

== Mixed martial arts career ==
In July 2021, Wilnis made the move to mixed martial arts after signing a deal with Netherlands-based Levels Fight League. He was scheduled to face Erhan Okuroglu at Levels Fight League 2 on July 26, 2021. Wilnis won his debut fight by a first-round technical knockout.

Wilnis faced David Casal Moldes at Levels Fight League 4 on March 13, 2022. Wilnis won the bout via unanimous decision.

Wilnis signed with KSW, making his debut on May 28, 2022, at KSW 70 against Radosław Paczuski. He lost the bout in the third round after breaking his finger.

Wilnis was booked to face Ahmed Sami at Levels Fight League 6 on October 2, 2022. He lost the bout via unanimous decision.

Wilnis faced Joey Berkenbosch on March 12, 2023, at Levels Fight League 8, losing by TKO stoppage due to elbows in the second round.

== Titles ==
- Glory
  - 2016 Glory Middleweight (-85 kg/187.4 lb) Championship
    - One successful title defense
- It's Showtime
  - 2012 It's Showtime 85MAX World Champion -85 kg

== Mixed martial arts record ==
Professional record breakdown
5 matches	2 wins	3 losses
By knockout	1	2
By decision	1	1

Res.	Record	Opponent	Method	Event	Date	Round	Time	Location	Notes
Loss	2–3	Joey Berkenbosch	TKO (elbows)	Levels Fight League 8	12 March 2023	2	3:38	Amsterdam, Netherlands	
Loss	2–2	Ahmed Sami	Decision (unanimous)	Levels Fight League 6	2 October 2022	3	5:00	Amsterdam, Netherlands	
Loss	2–1	Radosław Paczuski	TKO (finger injury)	KSW 70: Pudzianowski vs. Materla	28 May 2022	3	1:46	Łódź, Poland	
Win	2–0	David Casal Moldes	Decision (unanimous)	Levels Fight League 4	13 March 2022	3	5:00	Amsterdam, Netherlands	
Win	1–0	Erhan Okuroglu	TKO (punches)	Levels Fight League 2	26 July 2021	1	4:08	Amsterdam, Netherlands	

== Kickboxing record ==
Professional kickboxing record
31 Wins (8 (T)KO's), 12 Losses, 1 Draw
Date	Result	Opponent	Event	Location	Method	Round	Time
2020-08-27	Loss	(Slovakia) Vladimir Idranyi	Yangames Fight Night 8	Prague, Czech Republic	Decision (Unanimous)	3	3:00
2019-10-26	Loss	(Suriname) Donovan Wisse	Glory 70: Lyon	Lyon, France	Decision (Unanimous)	3	3:00
2019-05-17	Loss	(Brazil) Alex Pereira	Glory 65: Utrecht	Utrecht, Netherlands	KO (Flying Knee)	1	1:31
For the Glory Middleweight Championship.
2019-02-01	Win	(United States) Jacob Rodriguez	Glory 63: Houston	Houston, US	TKO (Leg Injury)	3	0:15
2018-08-10	Loss	(Canada) Simon Marcus	Glory 56: Denver	Broomfield, Colorado, US	Decision (Split)	3	3:00
2017-09-30	Loss	(Tunisia) Yousri Belgaroui	Glory 45: Amsterdam	Amsterdam, Netherlands	Doctor Stoppage (Cut)	1	2:47
2017-04-29	Loss	(Canada) Simon Marcus	Glory 40: Copenhagen	Copenhagen, Denmark	Decision (split)	5	3:00
Loses the Glory Middleweight Championship.
2017-01-20	Win	(Nigeria) Israel Adesanya	Glory 37: Los Angeles	Los Angeles, California, US	Decision (unanimous)	5	3:00
Retains the Glory Middleweight Championship.
2016-09-09	Win	(Canada) Simon Marcus	Glory 33: New Jersey	Trenton, New Jersey, US	TKO (referee stoppage)	3	1:14
Wins the Glory Middleweight Championship.
2016-05-13	Win	(United States) Joe Schilling	Glory 30: Los Angeles	Ontario, California	Decision (majority)	3	3:00
2016-03-12	Win	(Belgium) Filip Verlinden	Glory 28: Paris	Paris, France	Decision (unanimous)	3	3:00
2016-01-23	Win	(China) Wang Chongyang	Kunlun Fight 37	Sanya, China	Decision (majority)	3	3:00
2015-10-09	Loss	(United States) Joe Schilling	Glory 24: Denver	Denver, Colorado, US	TKO (injury)	2	3:00
GLORY Middleweight Championship eliminator.
2015-09-18	Win	(Austria) David Keclik	FFC 19 - Linz	Linz, Austria	TKO (retirement)	2	3:00
2015-04-03	Loss	(Canada) Simon Marcus	Glory 20: Dubai, Final	Dubai, UAE	Decision (split)	3	3:00
For the Glory Middleweight Contender Tournament.
2015-04-03	Win	(Brazil) Alex Pereira	Glory 20: Dubai, Semi-finals	Dubai, UAE	Decision (unanimous)	3	3:00
2014-11-07	Win	(United States) Wayne Barrett	Glory 18: Oklahoma	Oklahoma City, Oklahoma, US	Decision (unanimous)	3	3:00
2014-06-12	Win	(Slovakia) Tomáš Šenkýr	Gibu Fight Night	Prague, Czech Republic	Decision (unanimous)	3	3:00
2014-03-08	Loss	(Armenia) Sahak Parparyan	Glory 14: Zagreb, Semi-finals	Zagreb, Croatia	Decision (split)	3	3:00
2013-09-28	Loss	(Russia) Artem Levin	Glory 10: Los Angeles, Semi-finals	Ontario, California, US	Decision (unanimous)	3	3:00
2013-05-10	Win	(Croatia) Zoran Majkić	FFC04: Perak vs. Joni	Zadar, Croatia	KO	1	2:59
2013-03-15	Win	(Croatia) Toni Milanović	K-1 World Grand Prix FINAL in Zagreb, Super Fight	Zagreb, Croatia	TKO	1	
2012-12-31	Win	(Japan) Toshio Matsumoto	Glory 4: Tokyo	Saitama, Japan	Decision (unanimous)	3	3:00
2012-11-10	Win	(Brazil) Alex Pereira	It's Showtime 60	São Paulo, Brazil	TKO (3 knockdowns)	2	
Wins vacant It's Showtime 85MAX World title.
2012-09-15	Loss	(Armenia) Sahak Parparyan	Iron Ring	Alkmaar, Netherlands	Decision	3	3:00
2012-09-02	Win	(Cape Verde) Luis Tavares	Muay Thai Mania V	The Hague, Netherlands	Decision	3	3:00
2012-05-12	Loss	(France) Cheick Sidibé	Siam Gym Belgium presents: It's Showtime 56	Kortrijk, Belgium	Decision (unanimous)	3	3:00
2011-11-12	Win	(Spain) Francis Javier Jorge	It's Showtime 53	Tenerife, Spain	Decision	3	3:00
2010-12-18	Win	(Netherlands) Geronimo de Groot	Fightclub presents: It's Showtime 2010	Amsterdam, Netherlands	KO	1	
2010-08-29	Win	(Aruba) Brandon Richardson	Slamm Fighting with the Stars	Paramaribo, Suriname	TKO (punches)	1	
2010-05-02	Draw	(Bosnia and Herzegovina) Nale Omeragić	Next Generation Warriors 4, B-Class	Utrecht, Netherlands	Decision	3	3:00
2010-03-21	Win	(Netherlands) Joey Kaptijn	K-1 World MAX 2010 West Europe Tournament	Utrecht, Netherlands	Decision (unanimous)	3	3:00
2009-05-31	Win	(Netherlands) Youssef Yacoubi	Next Generation Warriors 3, C-Class, -79 kg	Utrecht, Netherlands	Decision	3	2:00
2009-03-01	Win	(Netherlands) Edgar Sadoiev	K-1 World MAX 2009 Europe Tournament, C-Class	Utrecht, Netherlands	Decision (Unanimous)	3	2:00
Legend: Win Loss Draw/No contest Notes

== See also ==
- List of It's Showtime events
- List of It's Showtime champions
- List of male kickboxers
