= Karapet Karapetyan =

Armenian-Dutch kickboxer

- Born: 1982 (age 43–44); Armenia SSR, Soviet Union
- Native name: Կարապետ Կարապետյան
- Other names: Karapet Papijan
- Nationality: Armenian; Dutch
- Height: 1.85 m (6 ft 1 in)
- Weight: 77.1 kg (170 lb; 12.14 st)
- Division: Super Middleweight; Light Heavyweight
- Reach: 78.0 in (198 cm)
- Style: Kickboxing, Muay Thai
- Stance: Orthodox
- Fighting out of: Nijmegen, Netherlands
- Team: Ubeda Gym; Golden Glory Breda
- Trainer: Perry Ubeda; Cor Hemmers
- Years active: 2002–present

Professional boxing record
- Total: 3
- Wins: 2
- By knockout: 0
- Losses: 1
- By knockout: 0
- Draws: 0

Kickboxing record
- Total: 58
- Wins: 43
- By knockout: 4
- Losses: 13
- By knockout: 1
- Draws: 2

Other information
- University: Radboud University Nijmegen
- Last updated on: May 3, 2014

Karapet Karapetyan (Armenian: Կարապետ Կարապետյան; born 1982), also known as Karapet Papijan is an Armenian-Dutch kickboxer who competes in the super middleweight and light heavyweight divisions. A professional since 2002, Karapetyan established himself on the Dutch scene by becoming a national champion and having a short stint in the It's Showtime promotion before two ill-fated world title shots in 2012. He signed with Glory the following year. As of 2 November 2015, he is ranked the #3 welterweight in the world by GLORY.

== Early life ==
Born in Armenia, Karapet Karapetyan moved to the Netherlands aged sixteen in 1998 in the aftermath of the First Nagorno-Karabakh War, initially living in Rotterdam before settling in Nijmegen with his parents and two sisters. He had limited martial arts training in his homeland but began training in kickboxing and Muay Thai seriously under the tutelage of Perry Ubeda after his arrival in Nijmegen, having his first fight after six months of preparation.

== Career ==
=== Early career (2002–2012) ===
Having turned professional in 2002, Karapetyan spent a number of years honing his skills on the Dutch kickboxing and Muay Thai scene in a rather unremarkable beginning to his career. On June 4, 2006, he competed in the World Full Contact Association (WFCA) 2006 Super Middleweight (−76.2 kg/168 lb) Tournament in Druten, Netherlands, outpointing Mustafa Yılmaz in the quarter-finals and Winston Martens in the semis before losing to Joost Bauhaus, who he was already 0–1–1 against in two previous fights, in the final. The tournament final between the pair was scored a draw after the regulation three round and so it went to an extension round to decide the winner, after which Bauhaus came out on top.

Later that year, on October 8, he rematched Winston Martens, taking a decision win to be crowned the WFCA Dutch Super Middleweight Champion. In early 2007, Karapetyan had a brief stint in the It's Showtime promotion. He won the It's Showtime 75MAX Trophy 2007 - Zwolle on February 2, 2007, taking decision wins over Yücel Fidan, Amir Zeyada and Tarek Slimani, respectively, before dropping a unanimous decision to Ondřej Hutník in his second and last appearance in the organization at Fights at the Border presents: It's Showtime Trophy 2007 on March 24, 2007.

Replacing Grega Smole who withdrew from the fight, Karapetyan challenged Nieky Holzken for his WFCA World Super Middleweight K-1 Championship in Eindhoven, Netherlands on February 12, 2012, losing by decision after five rounds. After rebounding with consecutive wins over Yakup Kaya and Alexandros Chatzichronoglou in the next two months, he then lost to Marc de Bonte on points on May 19, 2012.

For the second time that year, Karapetyan challenged for a world title as a late replacement when he filled in for Artem Vakhitov who conceded that he would not be able to make the −79.3 kg/175 lb weight limit in a fight for Joe Schilling's WBC Muaythai Interim World Light Heavyweight Championship at Battle for the Belts in Bangkok, Thailand on June 9, 2012. He lost by unanimous decision, losing out in every round but the third.

Turning his hand to professional boxing, he won the Ben Bril Memorial 6 Light Heavyweight (−79.3 kg/175 lb) Grand Prix in Amsterdam, Netherlands on October 15, 2012, beating Jeremy Blijd in the semi-finals and Marino Schouten in the final. He closed out the year with a controversial majority decision loss to Alexander Stetsurenko at Fight Nights: Battle of Moscow 9 in Moscow, Russia on December 16, 2012. The match, fought at −80 kg/176 lb, saw Karapetyan give Stetsurenko a lot of trouble, not allowing him to get inside and peppering him from the outside. Stetsurenko looked to have hurt Karapetyan a few times when he was able to get inside, and ultimately got a razor thin decision victory.

=== Glory (2013–present) ===
Signing with Glory in 2013 as a competitor in the organization's −77.1 kg/170 lb welterweight division, Karapetyan made his promotional debut against Roberto Cocco at Glory 7: Milan in Milan, Italy on April 20, 2013, and winning by unanimous decision. He rematched Alexander Stetsurenko on the Glory 10: Los Angeles undercard in Ontario, California, United States on September 28, 2013, and avenged his earlier defeat to the Russian with a unanimous decision victory.

In his return to boxing on October 14, 2013, he was unable to retain the title that he won a year previously as he was eliminated by Joos Poulino in the semi-finals of the seventh edition of the Ben Bril Memorial tournament.

Karapetyan competed in the four-man Glory 13: Tokyo - Welterweight World Championship Tournament in Tokyo, Japan on December 21, 2013. He was originally set to face Joseph Valtellini in the semi-finals but his opponent was later changed to Nieky Holzken when the matchups were reshuffled. Karapetyan was knocked down in rounds one and two and lost by unanimous decision.

He defeated Artur Kyshenko by unanimous decision on the Glory 14: Zagreb undercard in Zagreb, Croatia on March 8, 2014. Replacing Nieky Holzken who withdrew from the match due to a recurring shoulder injury, Karapetyan challenged Marc de Bonte for the inaugural Glory Welterweight Championship at Glory 16: Denver in Broomfield, Colorado, United States on May 3, 2014, losing by split decision.

Karapetyan was scheduled to face Hicham El Gaoui for the Enfusion 80 kg title at Enfusion Live 25 on March 14, 2015. He lost the fight by unanimous decision.

Karapetyan was scheduled to face Yoann Kongolo at Glory 26: Amsterdam on December 4, 2015. Kongolo won the fight by unanimous decision.

Karapetyan was scheduled to face Yohan Lidon at CAPITAL FIGHTS on May 19, 2016. He lost the fight by a fourth-round knockout.

== Personal life ==
Karapetyan graduated with a master's degree in law from Radboud University Nijmegen in 2011. He is able to speak five languages; Dutch, English, German and Russian in addition to his native Armenian.

== Championships and awards ==
=== Boxing ===
- Ben Bril Memorial
  - Ben Bril Memorial 6 Light Heavyweight (−79.3 kg/175 lb) Grand Prix Championship

=== Kickboxing ===
- It's Showtime
  - It's Showtime 75MAX (−75 kg/165 lb) Trophy 2007 – Zwolle Championship
- World Full Contact Association
  - WFCA 2006 Super Middleweight (−76.2 kg/168 lb) Tournament runner-up
  - WFCA Dutch Super Middleweight (−76.2 kg/168 lb) Championship

== Boxing record ==
Boxing record
2 wins (0 KOs), 1 loss, 0 draws
Date	Result	Opponent	Event	Location	Method	Round	Time	Record
2013-10-14	Loss	(Netherlands) Joos Poulino	Ben Bril Memorial 7, Semi Finals	Amsterdam, Netherlands	Decision (majority)	4	3:00	2–1
2012-10-15	Win	(Netherlands) Marino Schouten	Ben Bril Memorial 6, Final	Amsterdam, Netherlands	Decision (split)	4	3:00	2–0
Wins the Ben Bril Memorial 6 Light Heavyweight (−79.3 kg/175 lb) Grand Prix Championship.
2012-10-15	Win	(Netherlands) Jeremy Blijd	Ben Bril Memorial 6, Semi Finals	Amsterdam, Netherlands	Decision (unanimous)	4	3:00	1–0
Legend: Win Loss Draw/no contest Notes

== Kickboxing record ==
Kickboxing record
43 wins (4 KOs), 13 losses, 2 draws
Date	Result	Opponent	Event	Location	Method	Round	Time	Record
2016-05-19	Loss	(France) Yohan Lidon	CAPITAL FIGHTS		KO (high kick)	4		43–13–2
2015-12-04	Loss	(Switzerland) Yoann Kongolo	Glory 26: Amsterdam	Amsterdam, Netherlands	Decision (unanimous)	3	3:00	43–12–2
2015-03-14	Loss	(Morocco) Hicham El Gaoui	Enfusion Live 25	Turnhout, Belgium	Decision (unanimous)	5	3:00	43–11–2
For Enfusion Live World Championship −80 kg.
2014-05-03	Loss	(Belgium) Marc de Bonte	Glory 16: Denver	Broomfield, Colorado, USA	Decision (split)	5	3:00	43–10–2
For the Glory Welterweight Championship.
2014-03-08	Win	(Ukraine) Artur Kyshenko	Glory 14: Zagreb	Zagreb, Croatia	Decision (unanimous)	3	3:00	43–9–2
2013-12-21	Loss	(Netherlands) Nieky Holzken	Glory 13: Tokyo – Welterweight World Championship Tournament, Semi Finals	Tokyo, Japan	Decision (unanimous)	3	3:00	42–9–2
2013-09-28	Win	(Russia) Alexander Stetsurenko	Glory 10: Los Angeles	Ontario, California, USA	Decision (unanimous)	3	3:00	42–8–2
2013-04-20	Win	(Italy) Roberto Cocco	Glory 7: Milan	Milan, Italy	Decision (unanimous)	3	3:00	41–8–2
2012-12-16	Loss	(Russia) Alexander Stetsurenko	Fight Nights: Battle of Moscow 9	Moscow, Russia	Decision (majority)	3	3:00	40–8–2
2012-06-09	Loss	(United States) Joe Schilling	Battle for the Belts	Bangkok, Thailand	Decision (unanimous)	5	3:00	40–7–2
For the WBC Muaythai Interim World Light Heavyweight (−79.3 kg/175 lb) Championship.
2012-05-19	Loss	(Belgium) Marc de Bonte			Decision	3	3:00	39–7–2
2012-04-01	Win	(Greece) Alexandros Chatzichronoglou	Gladiator's Night 6	Chalcis, Greece	KO (left flying knee)	2	2:00	39–6–2
2012-03-10	Win	(Belgium) Yakup Kaya	MaxPain	Genk, Belgium	Decision	3	3:00	38–6–2
2012-02-12	Loss	(Netherlands) Nieky Holzken	Natural Powers	Eindhoven, Netherlands	Decision	5	3:00	37–6–2
For the WFCA World Super Middleweight (−76.2 kg/168 lb) K-1 Championship.
2007-10-20	Win	(Turkey) Ali Cenik	StarMuay Fight Night Maastricht	Maastricht, Netherlands	Decision	3	3:00	
2007-03-24	Loss	(Czech Republic) Ondřej Hutník	Fights at the Border presents: It's Showtime Trophy 2007	Lommel, Belgium	Decision (unanimous)	3	3:00	
2007-02-02	Win	(Morocco) Tarek Slimani	It's Showtime 75MAX Trophy 2007 - Zwolle, Final	Zwolle, Netherlands	Decision	3	3:00	
Wins the It's Showtime 75MAX (−75 kg/165 lb) Trophy 2007 – Zwolle Championship.
2007-02-02	Win	(Egypt) Amir Zeyada	It's Showtime 75MAX Trophy 2007 - Zwolle, Semi Finals	Zwolle, Netherlands	Decision	3	3:00	
2007-02-02	Win	(Turkey) Yücel Fidan	It's Showtime 75MAX Trophy 2007 - Zwolle, Quarter Finals	Zwolle, Netherlands	Decision	3	3:00	
2006-10-08	Win	(Suriname) Winston Martens	Battle of Arnhem V	Arnhem, Netherlands	Decision	5	3:00	
Wins the WFCA Dutch Super Middleweight (−76.2 kg/168 lb) Championship.
2006-06-04	Loss	(Netherlands) Joost Bauhaus	WFCA Kickbox Gala Druten, Final	Druten, Netherlands	Extension round decision	4	3:00	
For the WFCA 2006 Super Middleweight (−76.2 kg/168 lb) Tournament Championship.
2006-06-04	Win	(Suriname) Winston Martens	WFCA Kickbox Gala Druten, Semi Finals	Druten, Netherlands	Decision	3	3:00	
2006-06-04	Win	(Turkey) Mustafa Yılmaz	WFCA Kickbox Gala Druten, Quarter Finals	Druten, Netherlands	Decision	3	3:00	
2005-11-13	Draw	(Netherlands) Joost Bauhaus	Time for Action	Nijmegen, Netherlands	Draw	5	3:00	
2005-06-04	Win	(Netherlands) Andre Gutsch	Enter the Dragon	Arnhem, Netherlands	Decision	3	3:00	
2005-04-16	Win	(Netherlands) Moncef Bennour	MMA, Karate and Muay Thai Gala	Emmen, Netherlands	Decision	5	3:00	
2004-01-25	Loss	(Netherlands) Joost Bauhaus		Nijmegen, Netherlands	Decision			
2003-11-12	Loss	(Netherlands) Sem Braan	Veni, Vidi, Vici II	Veenendaal, Netherlands	Decision (unanimous)	5	2:00	
2003-00-00	Win	(Netherlands) Henry Akdeniz		Netherlands	KO			
Legend: Win Loss Draw/no contest Notes
