= Raymond Daniels (martial artist) =

American mixed martial artist and kickboxer

- Born: April 29, 1980 (age 46); Sun Valley, California, U.S.
- Other names: The Real Deal
- Height: 6 ft 3 in (1.91 m)
- Weight: 185 lb (84 kg; 13.2 st)
- Division: Welterweight
- Reach: 74 in (188 cm)
- Style: Karate, Taekwondo, kickboxing
- Stance: Southpaw
- Fighting out of: Long Beach, California, U.S.
- Team: Los Angeles Stars; Team Paul Mitchell Karate; World Champion Karate; Classic Fight Team; Team Alpha Male (2021–present)
- Trainer: Tyler Wombles
- Rank: 6th degree black belt in American Kenpo; 6th dan black belt in Shotokan Karate; 5th dan black belt in Taekwondo; Blue belt in Brazilian Jiu-Jitsu under Joe Murphy
- Years active: 2006–present

Kickboxing record
- Total: 38
- Wins: 35
- By knockout: 22
- Losses: 3
- By knockout: 3

Mixed martial arts record
- Total: 5
- Wins: 3
- By knockout: 2
- By decision: 1
- Losses: 1
- By submission: 1
- No contests: 1

Other information
- Website: www.raymonddaniels.com
- Last updated on: March 21, 2016

Raymond Daniels (born April 29, 1980) is an American professional kickboxer, mixed martial artist, and former sport karate competitor. He currently competes for Karate Combat in the Welterweight division. He has formerly competed for Bellator MMA and Bellator Kickboxing, where he was the Bellator Kickboxing Welterweight Champion and was a 2 time runner up for the Glory welterweight title.

Daniels holds black belt ranks in American Kenpo (6th dan), Shotokan Karate (6th dan) and Kukkiwon Taekwondo (5th dan), and a blue belt rank in Brazilian Jiu-Jitsu. He is known for his flashy and aggressive style of fighting.

== Background ==
Daniels was born in Sun Valley, California, and raised in Palmdale, California. His grandfather Frankie Daniels was a professional boxer as well as a Korean War veteran and Purple Heart recipient. He began training in American Kenpo karate in 1985 under the tutelage of his father Frank Daniels and earned his black belt in 1992.

While still in high school, Daniels became a single father. Seeking a better life for him and his son, Daniels realized his boyhood dream of becoming a police officer with the Long Beach Police Department at the age of 21. After more than seven years of service, Daniels retired to concentrate on his martial arts career.

== Career ==
Daniels had humble beginnings as a junior competitor in sport karate competitions. By the age of 19, he would go on to become a top ranked fighter for both the National Black Belt League (NBL) and the North American Sport Karate Association (NASKA). Among his titles are eight NBL World Championships, at least two NASKA world championships, a second-place finish at the $50,000 World Pro Taekwondo Championship in Croatia in 2010, and nine overall championships at the W.A.K.O Irish Open with his best win over Michael Page.

Don Rodrigues, coach and co-founder of the famed Team Paul Mitchell Karate, recruited Daniels in 1999. Daniels left the Paul Mitchell Team in 2001, joining other teams in successive years.

In 2006, Daniels began fighting for Chuck Norris' World Combat League as captain of the Los Angeles Stars. Daniels fought in the 80 kg/178 lbs and 88 kg/195 lbs weight divisions, compiling a 17–0–0 (9 KO) fight record. Daniels had a highly anticipated bout with fellow undefeated kickboxing star Stephen "Wonderboy" Thompson. Daniels initially won the bout by technical knockout due to a knee injury suffered by Thompson. However, this was later overturned into a no contest.

Daniels defeated Peyton Russell via third-round TKO (three knockdown rule) at the K-1 World Grand Prix 2007 in Las Vegas on August 11, 2007.

Daniels defeated Michael Page at the W.A.K.O. Irish Open 2008, winning gold in the 84 kg semi-contact division.

Daniels would then set his sights on the world of mixed martial arts and was touted by Strikeforce as "the next Cung Le". On June 27, 2008, he made his MMA debut against twelve fight veteran Jeremiah Metcalf at Strikeforce: Melendez vs. Thomson. Daniels was defeated by submission via rear-naked choke in the second round.

Daniels defended his gold, in the 84 kg semi-contact division, in a rematch against Michael Page at the W.A.K.O. Irish Open 2009.

Daniels defeated Michael Page in their trilogy bout at the W.A.K.O. Irish Open 2011, securing gold in the 84 kg semi-contact division.

In his first outing under full Oriental kickboxing rules, Daniels defeated two opponents in Dublin, Ireland on October 8, 2011, to win the four man 84 kg/185 lbs tournament at the Pain and Glory event. After knocking out English Muay Thai fighter Andy Bakewell with a spinning heel kick in the semi-finals, he took a split decision over Irish kickboxer Mark Casserly in the final.

=== Glory ===
In 2013, he then signed with Glory and was set to debut at Glory 5: London on March 23, 2013, in London, England but was later removed from the card for undisclosed reasons.

Daniels defeated Brian Foster with a first-round spinning heel kick at Glory 11: Chicago - Heavyweight World Championship Tournament in Hoffman Estates, Illinois, on October 12, 2013.

On December 21, 2013, he replaced Marc de Bonte in the Glory 13: Tokyo - Welterweight World Championship Tournament in Tokyo, Japan for undisclosed reasons and suffered his first kickboxing loss at the hands of Joseph Valtellini in the semi-finals. He initially caused some problems for Valtellini with his unorthodox karate style but by round two the Canadian began to hurt Daniels with low kicks. Daniels was knocked out by a high kick in the third round.

On May 3, 2014, Daniels scored a spinning kick KO over François Ambang inside the opening round at Glory 16: Denver in Broomfield, Colorado, United States. His performance was hailed by Glory as the "Knockout of the Century."

On February 6, 2015, Daniels was part of a one-night, four-man welterweight tournament at Glory 19: Virginia. In the semifinals, he faced Jonatan Oliveira and won via TKO. Daniels knocked Oliveira down with a spinning heel kick to the head in the first round and scored another knock down with a spinning kick to the body early in the second round. A knee to the groin of Oliveira led to a short intermission, after which Daniels hit Oliveira with another spinning kick to the body, forcing the TKO at 2:15 of the second round. In the finals, he faced Nieky Holzken and was knocked down early in the first round by a punch to the body. Daniels was unable to deal well with Holzken's pressure, who cut off the ring and locked Daniels up in the corners whenever possible. The second round saw Daniels being knocked down twice more, before scoring a controversial down himself in the third with one of his spin kicks. Holzken then locked Daniels up in a corner once more and knocked him down with a right hook to the head, forcing the stoppage at 1:25 of the third round after four knock downs.

On May 8, 2015, he defeated Justin Baesman in the co-main event at Glory 21: San Diego by KO (liver kick) after just 51 seconds inside the first round.

After Joseph Valtellini vacated his title due to health issues, Raymond Daniels was set to face Nieky Holzken for the welterweight world championship at Glory 23: Las Vegas on August 7, 2015. Daniels won the first two rounds on the judges scorecards due to a higher output of strikes. In the third round, Holzken managed to corner him and scored a combination which ended with a jump right knee that cut him above the eye prompting referee John McCarthy to stop the match.

On November 28, 2015, Daniels won gold at the W.A.K.O. World Championships 2015 (Dublin) in the 89 kg semi-contact division.

=== Bellator Kickboxing ===
On April 16, 2016, he defeated Francesco Moricca at Bellator Kickboxing 1 in Turin via TKO (liver kick) in the first round.

On June 24, 2016, he defeated Stefano Bruno at Bellator Kickboxing 2 in St. Louis via TKO (liver kick) in the first round.

On September 17, 2016, he defeated Zsolt Benedek at Bellator Kickboxing 3 in Budapest via unanimous decision.

On April 14, 2017, he defeated Csaba Gyorfi at Bellator Kickboxing 6 in Budapest via TKO (liver kick).

On September 23, 2017, he defeated Karim Ghajji at Bellator Kickboxing 7 in San Jose via TKO (doctor stoppage).

On December 9, 2017, he defeated Giannis Boukis at Bellator Kickboxing 8 in Florence via unanimous decision (29-28, 30–27, 30-27).

On April 6, 2018, he defeated Djibril Ehouo at Bellator Kickboxing 9 in Budapest via unanimous decision (50-44, 50–44, 50-43).

On December 1, 2018, he defeated Zakaria Laaouatni at Bellator Kickboxing 11 in Genoa via majority decision (29-29, 29–28, 29-28).

=== Mixed martial arts ===
On May 4, 2019, more than a decade after his first MMA bout, Daniels returned to mixed martial arts and faced Wilker Barros at Bellator Birmingham. He won the fight via knockout in the first round.

On January 25, 2020, Daniels next faced Jason King at Bellator 238. He won the fight via TKO in the first round.

On September 11, 2020, Daniels faced Peter Stanonik at Bellator 245. The bout ended in a no contest after two unintentional groin kicks from Daniels rendered Stanonik unable to continue.

On April 16, 2021, on the last bout of his prevailing contract, Daniels faced Peter Stanonik in an immediate rematch at Bellator 257. He won the bout via unanimous decision.

=== Karate Combat ===
In 2022, Daniels announced that he had signed an exclusive multi-fight contract with Karate Combat. Daniels made his debut at Karate Combat 35 on August 27, 2022, where he defeated Franklin Mina via unanimous decision.

On December 17, 2022, Daniels next faced former karate world champion and 2020 Olympic silver medalist Rafael Aghayev for the interim Karate Combat Welterweight Championship at Karate Combat 37. Daniels lost by unanimous decision.

== Personal life ==
Daniels is a father and currently lives in Orange, California. He is an instructor at World Champion Karate in Orange, California with his business partner Steven Horst. Daniels co-founded ICE Martial Arts, a personal training and nutrition institute.

He refrains from recreational drug use.

Daniels is married to fellow mixed martial arts fighter Colbey Northcutt, sister of Sage Northcutt, who is also an MMA fighter. Their marriage took place on August 24, 2019, in Temecula, California.

== Championships and awards ==
=== Kickboxing ===
==== Amateur (point fighting/sport karate) ====
- North American Sport Karate Association
  - 2004 NASKA World Championship
  - 2002 NASKA World Championship
- National Blackbelt League
  - 8x NBL World Champion (2003-2010)
- World Association of Kickboxing Organizations
  - 2015 W.A.K.O. World Championship Point Fighting -89 kg (gold)
  - 2014 Irish Open Grand Champion
  - 2012 Irish Open Grand Champion
  - 2011 Irish Open Grand Champion
  - 2010 Irish Open Grand Champion
  - 2009 Irish Open Grand Champion
  - 2008 Irish Open Grand Champion
  - 2007 Irish Open Grand Champion
  - 2006 Irish Open Grand Champion
  - 2005 Irish Open Grand Champion

==== Professional ====
- Bellator Kickboxing
  - Bellator Kickboxing Welterweight Championship (one time)
- Pain and Glory
  - Pain and Glory -84 kg/185 lb Tournament Championship
- World Combat League
  - 2007–08 WCL Championship – with LA Stars

=== Taekwondo ===
- World Pro Taekwondo Championships
  - 2010 World Pro Taekwondo Championships runner-up

== Kickboxing record ==
Kickboxing record
35 wins (22 KOs), 3 losses
Date	Result	Opponent	Event	Location	Method	Round	Time
2018-12-01	Win	(France) Zakaria Laaouatni	Bellator Kickboxing 11	Genoa, Italy	Decision (majority)	3	3:00
2018-04-06	Win	(France) Djibril Ehouo	Bellator Kickboxing 9	Budapest, Hungary	Decision (unanimous)	5	3:00
Retained the Bellator Kickboxing Welterweight Championship.
2017-12-09	Win	(Greece) Giannis Boukis	Bellator Kickboxing 8	Florence, Italy	Decision (unanimous)	3	3:00
2017-09-23	Win	(France) Karim Ghajji	Bellator Kickboxing 7	San Jose, California, USA	TKO (doctor stoppage)	1	3:00
Wins the Bellator Kickboxing Welterweight Championship.
2017-04-14	Win	(Hungary) Csaba Gyorfi	Bellator Kickboxing 6	Budapest, Hungary	TKO (spinning back kick)	3	0:36
2016-09-17	Win	(Hungary) Zsolt Benedek	Bellator Kickboxing 3	Budapest, Hungary	Decision (unanimous)	3	3:00
2016-06-24	Win	(Italy) Stefano Bruno	Bellator Kickboxing 2	St. Louis, Missouri, USA	TKO (liver kick)	1	1:45
2016-04-16	Win	(Italy) Francesco Moricca	Bellator Kickboxing 1	Torino, Italy	TKO (liver kick)	1	0:30
2015-08-07	Loss	(Netherlands) Nieky Holzken	Glory 23: Las Vegas	Las Vegas, Nevada, USA	TKO (cut, doctor stoppage)	3	1:36
For the vacant Glory Welterweight Championship.
2015-05-08	Win	(United States) Justin Baesman	Glory 21: San Diego	San Diego, California, USA	KO (liver kick)	1	0:51
2015-02-06	Loss	(Netherlands) Nieky Holzken	Glory 19: Virginia - Welterweight Contender Tournament, Final	Hampton, Virginia, USA	TKO (4 knockdowns)	3	1:25
For the Glory Welterweight Contender Tournament.
2015-02-06	Win	(Brazil) Jonatan Oliveira	Glory 19: Virginia - Welterweight Contender Tournament, Semi Finals	Hampton, Virginia, USA	TKO (3 knockdowns)	2	2:15
2014-05-03	Win	(United States) François Ambang	Glory 16: Denver	Broomfield, Colorado, USA	KO (left spinning heel kick)	1	1:47
2013-12-21	Loss	(Canada) Joseph Valtellini	Glory 13: Tokyo - Welterweight World Championship Tournament, Semi Finals	Tokyo, Japan	KO (right high kick)	3	1:20
2013-10-12	Win	(United States) Brian Foster	Glory 11: Chicago	Hoffman Estates, Illinois, USA	TKO (right spinning heel kick)	1	2:24
2011-10-08	Win	(Republic of Ireland) Mark Casserly	Pain and Glory, Final	Dublin, Ireland	Decision (split)	4	3:00
Won the Pain and Glory -84 kg/185 lb Tournament Championship.
2011-10-08	Win	(England) Andy Bakewell	Pain and Glory, Semi Finals	Dublin, Ireland	KO (right spinning heel kick)	1	
2008-06-07	Win	(United States) Brandon Banda	World Combat League	New York, New York, USA	KO (spinning heel kick)	1	0:55
2008-06-07	Win	(United States) Jaime Fletcher	World Combat League	New York, New York, USA	Decision (18-5)	1	3:00
2008-05-03	Win	(United States) Scott Clark	World Combat League	Oklahoma, USA	Decision (16-9)	1	3:00
2008-05-03	Win	(United States) Chidi Njokuani	World Combat League	Oklahoma, USA	Decision (18-6)	1	3:00
2008-02-23	Win	(United States) El-Java Abdul-Qadir	World Combat League	Denver, Colorado, USA	KO (left hook and right high kick)	1	2:37
2008-02-23	Win	(United States) Chris Decaro	World Combat League	Denver, Colorado, USA	KO (spinning back kick)	1	1:10
2008-01-18	Win	(United States) Blake Lirette	World Combat League	Denver, Colorado, USA	KO (right cross)	1	2:24
2008-01-18	Win	(United States) Blake Lirette	World Combat League	Denver, Colorado, USA	Decision (15-8)	1	3:00
2007-12-14	Win	(United States) Damion Caldwell	World Combat League	Texas, USA	KO (spinning back kick)	1	0:20
2007-12-14	Win	(United States) Antoine McRae	World Combat League	Texas, USA	KO	1	
2007-10-19	Win	(United States) Marcus Wayne	World Combat League	Oklahoma, USA	DQ	1	
2007-10-19	Win	(United States) Ryan Madigan	World Combat League	Oklahoma, USA	Decision (18-6)	1	3:00
2007-08-11	Win	(United States) Peyton Russell	K-1 World Grand Prix 2007 in Las Vegas	Las Vegas, Nevada, USA	TKO	3	2:20
2007-01-20	Win	(United States) Damion Caldwell	World Combat League	Philadelphia, Pennsylvania, USA	KO (punches)	1	1:57
2007-01-20	NC	(United States) Stephen Thompson	World Combat League	Philadelphia, Pennsylvania, USA	Knee injury	1	
Originally a TKO (injury), overturned to a NC
2006-09-22	Win	(United States) Lawrence Baker	World Combat League	Texas, USA	Decision (15-8)	1	3:00
2006-09-22	Win	(United States) Lawrence Baker	World Combat League	Texas, USA	Decision (15-8)	1	3:00
2006-03-03	Win	(United States) Ronnie Copeland	World Combat League	Las Vegas, Nevada, USA	KO (spinning heel kick)	1	0:46
2006-03-03	Win	(Sweden) Andreas Spång	World Combat League	Las Vegas, Nevada, USA	Decision (15-7)	1	3:00
Legend: Win Loss Draw/no contest Notes

== Karate Combat record ==
Professional record breakdown
5 matches	3 wins	2 losses
By decision	3	2

Res.	Record	Opponent	Method	Event	Date	Round	Time	Location	Notes
Loss	3–2	Eddie Farrell	Decision	Karate Combat 45	April 20, 2024	4	3:00	Dubai, United Arab Emirates	Karate vs. Muay Thai
Win	3–1	Bruno Souza	Decision (unanimous)	Karate Combat 43	December 15, 2023	3	3:00	Las Vegas, Nevada, United States	
Win	2–1	Sasha Palatnikov	Decision (unanimous)	Karate Combat 39	May 20, 2023	3	3:00	Miami, Florida, United States	
Loss	1–1	Rafael Aghayev	Decision (unanimous)	Karate Combat 37	December 17, 2022	3	2:02	Orlando, Florida, United States	For the interim Karate Combat Welterweight Championship.
Win	1–0	Bruno Assis	Decision (unanimous)	Karate Combat 35	August 27, 2022	3	3:00	Orlando, Florida, United States	

== Mixed martial arts record ==
Professional record breakdown
5 matches	3 wins	1 loss
By knockout	2	0
By submission	0	1
By decision	1	0
No contests	1	

Res.	Record	Opponent	Method	Event	Date	Round	Time	Location	Notes
Win	3–1 (1)	Peter Stanonik	Decision (unanimous)	Bellator 257	April 16, 2021	3	5:00	Uncasville, Connecticut, United States	
NC	2–1 (1)	Peter Stanonik	No contest (accidental groin strike)	Bellator 245	September 11, 2020	2	1:00	Uncasville, Connecticut, United States	Two consecutive unintentional groin kicks from Daniels rendered Stanonik unable to continue.
Win	2–1	Jason King	TKO (punches)	Bellator 238	January 25, 2020	1	3:07	Inglewood, California, United States	
Win	1–1	Wilker Barros	KO (punch)	Bellator: Birmingham	May 4, 2019	1	4:36	Birmingham, England, United Kingdom	
Loss	0–1	Jeremiah Metcalf	Submission (rear-naked choke)	Strikeforce: Melendez vs. Thomson	June 27, 2008	2	0:59	San Jose, California, United States	Middleweight bout.

== See also ==
- List of male kickboxers
