= 2014 in Glory =

Kickboxing events

Information
- First date: March 8, 2014
- Last date: November 7, 2014

Events
- Total events: 5

Fights

Chronology
2013 in Glory	2014 in Glory	2015 in Glory

The year 2014 was the 3rd year in the history of Glory, an international kickboxing event. 2014 starts with Glory 14: Zagreb, and ends with Glory 18: Oklahoma. The events were broadcast through television agreements with Spike TV and other regional channels around the world.

== List of events ==
#	Event title	Date	Arena	Location
1	Glory 14: Zagreb	March 8, 2014	Arena Zagreb	Zagreb, Croatia
2	Glory 15: Istanbul	April 12, 2014	Ülker Sports Arena	Istanbul, Turkey
3	Glory 16: Denver	May 3, 2014	1stBank Center	(United States) Broomfield, Colorado, USA
4	Glory 17: Los Angeles	June 21, 2014	The Forum	(United States) Inglewood, California, USA
5	Glory 18: Oklahoma	November 7, 2014	Grand Casino Hotel Resort	(United States) Shawnee, Oklahoma, USA

== Glory 14: Zagreb ==
Glory 14: Zagreb
- Promotion: Glory
- Date: March 8, 2014
- Venue: Arena Zagreb
- City: Zagreb, Croatia
- Attendance: 14,068

Event chronology
Glory 13: Tokyo	Glory 14: Zagreb	Glory 15: Istanbul

Glory 14: Zagreb was a kickboxing event held on March 8, 2014 at the Arena Zagreb in Zagreb, Croatia.

=== Background ===
This event featured heavyweight fight of Mirko Cro Cop vs. Remy Bonjasky as headliner, and world title fight for the inaugural Glory Lightweight Championship of Andy Ristie vs. Davit Kiria as co-headliner. This event also featured 4 men Middleweight Contender Tournament to earn a spot in 2014 Glory Middleweight World Championship Tournament.

Glory 14 had an average number of 495,000 viewers on Spike TV.

=== Results ===
Main Card (Spike)
Weight Class				Method	Round	Time	Notes
Heavyweight	(Netherlands) Remy Bonjasky	def.	(Croatia) Mirko Cro Cop	Decision (majority)	3	3:00
Middleweight	(Brazil) Alex Pereira	def.	(Armenia) Sahak Parparyan	Decision (majority)	3	3:00	Middleweight Contender Tournament Final
Lightweight	(Georgia (country)) Davit Kiria ^{1}	def.	(Suriname) Andy Ristie	KO	5	2:22	For the Lightweight Championship
Middleweight	(Brazil) Alex Pereira	def.	(United States) Dustin Jacoby	KO	1	2:00	Middleweight Contender Tournament Semi Final
Middleweight	(Armenia) Sahak Parparyan	def.	(Netherlands) Jason Wilnis	Decision (split)	3	3:00	Middleweight Contender Tournament Semi Final
Superfight Series
Heavyweight	(Croatia) Mladen Brestovac	def.	(Netherlands) Jahfarr Wilnis	KO (left high kick)	1	1:19
Heavyweight	(Romania) Benjamin Adegbuyi	def.	(Ukraine) Dmytro Bezus ^{2}	TKO (referee stoppage)	2	1:53
Lightweight	(Thailand) Aikpracha Meenayothin	def.	(Netherlands) Albert Kraus	Decision (split)	3	3:00
Light Heavyweight	(Croatia) Igor Jurković	def.	(Netherlands) Michael Duut	KO	1	1:14
Welterweight	(Armenia) Karapet Karapetyan	def.	(Ukraine) Artur Kyshenko	Decision (unanimous)	3	3:00
Lightweight	(Suriname) Murthel Groenhart	def.	(Croatia) Teo Mikelić ^{3}	TKO (cut)	1	3:00
Undercard
Heavyweight	(Czech Republic) Tomáš Hron	def.	(Belgium) Kirk Krouba ^{4}	Decision (unanimous)	3	3:00
Heavyweight	(Croatia) Mladen Kujundžić	def.	(Bosnia and Herzegovina) Elmir Mehić	TKO (Doctor stoppage)	2	3:00
Lightweight	(Slovenia) Samo Petje	def.	(Albania) Lirim Ahmeti	TKO	2

^{1} Ky Hollenbeck was replaced with Davit Kiria.
^{2} Jamal Ben Saddik was replaced with Dmytro Bezus.
^{3} Shemsi Beqiri was replaced with Teo Mikelić.
^{4} Dino Belošević was replaced with Kirk Krouba.

=== 2014 Glory Middleweight Contender Tournament bracket ===
Semi-finals
(Armenia) Sahak Parparyan	DEC
(Netherlands) Jason Wilnis	2-1
(United States) Dustin Jacoby	1R.
(Brazil) Alex Pereira	KO

Final
(Armenia) Sahak Parparyan	2-0
(Brazil) Alex Pereira	DEC

== Glory 15: Istanbul ==
Glory 15: Istanbul
- Promotion: Glory
- Date: April 12, 2014
- Venue: Ülker Sports Arena
- City: Istanbul, Turkey
- Attendance: 11,223

Event chronology
Glory 14: Zagreb	Glory 15: Istanbul	Glory 16: Denver

Glory 15: Istanbul was a kickboxing event held on April 12, 2014 at the Ülker Sports Arena in Istanbul, Turkey.

=== Background ===
This event featured Glory Light Heavyweight World Championship Tournament for the inaugural Glory Light Heavyweight Championship. Two bouts was held as semi-finals. The winners of the semi-finals proceeded to the final bout for the tournament championship. This event also featured other non-tournament one-off bouts, the two headlines.

It had average of 354,000 and peak of 720,000 viewers on Spike TV.

=== Results ===
Main Card (Spike)
Weight Class				Method	Round	Time	Notes
Light Heavyweight	(Turkey) Gökhan Saki	def.	(Suriname) Tyrone Spong	TKO (leg injury)	1	1:37	Light Heavyweight Championship Tournament Final; For the Light Heavyweight Championship
Lightweight	(Netherlands) Robin van Roosmalen	def.	(Armenia) Marat Grigorian	Decision (split)	3	3:00
Light Heavyweight	(Germany) Danyo Ilunga	def.	(Romania) Andrei Stoica	KO	1	2:33	Light Heavyweight Championship Tournament Reserve Bout
Light Heavyweight	(Suriname) Tyrone Spong	def.	(Brazil) Saulo Cavalari	Decision (unanimous)	3	3:00	Light Heavyweight Championship Tournament Semi Final
Light Heavyweight	(Turkey) Gökhan Saki	def.	(Australia) Nathan Corbett	TKO (doctor's stoppage)	1	2:35	Light Heavyweight Championship Tournament Semi Final
Superfight Series
Heavyweight	(Netherlands) Hesdy Gerges	def.	(Brazil) Jhonata Diniz	TKO (corner stoppage)	2	3:00
Light Heavyweight	(Tunisia) Mourad Bouzidi	def.	(United States) Randy Blake ^{1}	Decision (unanimous)	3	3:00
Light Heavyweight	(Belgium) Filip Verlinden	def.	(New Zealand) Israel Adesanya	Decision (unanimous)	3	3:00
Welterweight	(Brazil) Jonatan Oliveira	def.	(Turkey) Atakan Arslan	Decision (unanimous)	3	3:00
Lightweight	(Denmark) Niclas Larsen	def.	(Australia) Steve Moxon	TKO	2	1:33
Featherweight	(Thailand) Yodkhunpon Sitmonchai	def.	(Armenia) Raz Sarkisjan	Decision (majority)	3	3:00

^{1} Brian Collette was replaced with Randy Blake.

=== 2014 Glory Light Heavyweight World Championship Tournament bracket ===
Semi-finals
(Turkey) Gökhan Saki	TKO
(Australia) Nathan Corbett	1R.
(Suriname) Tyrone Spong	DEC
(Brazil) Saulo Cavalari	3-0

Final
(Turkey) Gökhan Saki	TKO
(Suriname) Tyrone Spong	1R.

== Glory 16: Denver ==
Glory 16: Denver
- Promotion: Glory
- Date: May 3, 2014
- Venue: 1stBank Center
- City: Broomfield, Colorado, USA
- Attendance: 3,101

Event chronology
Glory 15: Istanbul	Glory 16: Denver	Glory 17: Los Angeles

Glory 16: Denver was a kickboxing event held on May 3, 2014 at the 1stBank Center in Broomfield, Colorado, USA.

=== Background ===
This event featured world title fight for the inaugural Glory Welterweight Championship of Karapet Karapetyan vs. Marc de Bonte as headliner, and 4-Man Heavyweight Contender Tournament.

It had average of 498,000 and peak of 815,000 viewers on Spike TV.

=== Results ===
Main Card (Spike)
Weight Class				Method	Round	Time	Notes
Welterweight	(Belgium) Marc de Bonte	def.	(Armenia) Karapet Karapetyan ^{1}	Decision (split)	5	3:00	For the Welterweight Championship
Heavyweight	(Curaçao) Errol Zimmerman	def.	(Brazil) Anderson Silva	TKO	1	2:30	Heavyweight Contender Tournament Final
Heavyweight	(Democratic Republic of the Congo) Zack Mwekassa	def.	(United States) Pat Barry	KO	1	2:33	Heavyweight Contender Tournament Reserve Bout
Heavyweight	(Brazil) Anderson Silva	def.	(Russia) Sergey Kharitonov	Decision (unanimous)	3	3:00	Heavyweight Contender Tournament Semi Final
Heavyweight	(Curaçao) Errol Zimmerman	def.	(Australia) Ben Edwards	TKO	1	2:50	Heavyweight Contender Tournament Semi Final
Superfight Series
Heavyweight	(Romania) Benjamin Adegbuyi	def.	(United Kingdom) Daniel Sam	KO (right cross)	2	2:59
Middleweight	(Russia) Artem Levin	def.	(Canada) Robert Thomas	Decision (unanimous)	3	3:00
Heavyweight	(Morocco) Jamal Ben Saddik	def.	(France) Nicolas Wamba	TKO	2	1:24
Light Heavyweight	(Russia) Artem Vakhitov	def.	(Croatia) Igor Jurkovic	Decision (unanimous)	3	3:00
Welterweight	(United States) Raymond Daniels	def.	(United States) Francois Ambang	KO	1	1:47
Lightweight	(Canada) Josh Jauncey	def.	(South Africa) Warren Stevelmans	Decision (unanimous)	4	3:00

^{1} Nieky Holzken was replaced with Karapet Karapetyan.

=== 2014 Glory Heavyweight Contender Tournament bracket ===
Semi-finals
(Australia) Ben Edwards	1R.
(Curaçao) Errol Zimmerman	TKO
(Brazil) Anderson Silva	DEC
(Russia) Sergey Kharitonov	3-0

Final
(Curaçao) Errol Zimmerman	TKO
(Brazil) Anderson Silva	1R.

== Glory 17: Los Angeles ==
Glory 17: Los Angeles
- Promotion: Glory
- Date: June 21, 2014
- Venue: The Forum
- City: (United States) Inglewood, California, USA
- Attendance: 10,795

Event chronology
Glory 16: Denver	Glory 17: Los Angeles	Glory 18: Oklahoma

Glory 17: Los Angeles was a kickboxing event held on June 21, 2014 at The Forum in Inglewood, California, USA.

=== Background ===
This show was Glory's first Pay-per-view event. Main card of this event featured world title fight of Rico Verhoeven vs. Daniel Ghiță for the vacant Glory Heavyweight Championship, another world title fight of Marc de Bonte vs. Joseph Valtellini for the Glory Welterweight Championship, and 8-Man Glory Middleweight Last Man Standing Tournament for the inaugural Glory Middleweight Championship. Participants for middleweight tournament were Alex Pereira, Artem Levin, Bogdan Stoica, Filip Verlinden, Joe Schilling, Melvin Manhoef, Simon Marcus and Wayne Barrett.

On the preliminary card, a 4-Man Featherweight Contender Tournament and other one-off bouts were featured.

Mirko Cro Cop was first scheduled to face Pat Barry, and later Sergei Kharitonov on this card. However, on May 21, it was announced that Kharitonov had to withdraw from the fight due to injury. He was replaced by Jarrell Miller.

Miguel Torres was scheduled to make his GLORY debut as a participant of the Featherweight tournament. However, on May 28, it was revealed he pulled out of the tournament for undisclosed reasons. He was replaced by Marcus Vinicius.

Preliminary card had average of 487,000 viewers on Spike TV, and main card drew an estimated 6,000 PPV buys.

=== Results ===
Main Card (PPV)
Weight Class				Method	Round	Time	Notes
Middleweight	(Russia) Artem Levin	def.	(United States) Joe Schilling	Decision (unanimous)	3	3:00	Middleweight Last Man Standing Tournament Final; For the Middleweight Championship
Heavyweight	(Netherlands) Rico Verhoeven	def.	(Romania) Daniel Ghiță	Decision (unanimous)	5	3:00	For the Heavyweight Championship
Middleweight	(United States) Joe Schilling	def.	(United States) Wayne Barrett	Decision (split)	3	3:00	Middleweight Last Man Standing Tournament Semi Final
Middleweight	(Russia) Artem Levin	def.	(Belgium) Filip Verlinden	Decision (unanimous)	3	3:00	Middleweight Last Man Standing Tournament Semi Final
Welterweight	(Canada) Joseph Valtellini	def.	(Belgium) Marc de Bonte (c)	Decision (unanimous)	5	3:00	For the Welterweight Championship
Middleweight	(United States) Wayne Barrett	def.	(Romania) Bogdan Stoica	KO (punch)	3	0:58	Middleweight Last Man Standing Tournament Quarter Final
Middleweight	(United States) Joe Schilling	def.	(Canada) Simon Marcus	KO (punch)	4	2:41	Middleweight Last Man Standing Tournament Quarter Final
Middleweight	(Belgium) Filip Verlinden	def.	(Suriname) Melvin Manhoef	Decision (majority)	3	3:00	Middleweight Last Man Standing Tournament Quarter Final
Middleweight	(Russia) Artem Levin	def.	(Brazil) Alex Pereira	Decision (unanimous)	3	3:00	Middleweight Last Man Standing Tournament Quarter Final
Preliminary Card (Spike)
Weight Class				Method	Round	Time	Notes
Heavyweight	(Croatia) Mirko Cro Cop	def.	(United States) Jarrell Miller^{1}	Decision (unanimous)	3	3:00
Featherweight	(Canada) Gabriel Varga	def.	(United States) Shane Oblonsky	Decision (unanimous)	3	3:00	Featherweight Contender Tournament Final
Lightweight	(Suriname) Andy Ristie	def.	(United States) Ky Hollenbeck	KO (punch)	1	0:35
Featherweight	(United States) Shane Oblonsky	def.	(Brazil) Marcus Vinicius^{2}	Decision (unanimous)	3	3:00	Featherweight Contender Tournament Semi Final
Featherweight	(Canada) Gabriel Varga	def.	(Thailand) Yodkhunpon Sitmonchai	Decision (unanimous)	3	3:00	Featherweight Contender Tournament Semi Final

^{1} Pat Barry was replaced with Sergei Kharitonov, and later Jarrell Miller.
^{2} Miguel Torres was replaced with Marcus Vinicius.

=== 2014 Glory Middleweight Last Man Standing Tournament bracket ===
Quarter-finals
(Russia) Artem Levin	DEC
(Brazil) Alex Pereira	3-0
(Belgium) Filip Verlinden	DEC
(Suriname) Melvin Manhoef	2-0
(United States) Joe Schilling	KO
(Canada) Simon Marcus	4R.^{1}
(United States) Wayne Barrett	KO
(Romania) Bogdan Stoica	3R.

Semi-finals
(Russia) Artem Levin	DEC
(Belgium) Filip Verlinden	3-0
(United States) Joe Schilling	DEC
(United States) Wayne Barrett	2-1

Final
(Russia) Artem Levin	DEC
(United States) Joe Schilling	3-0

^{1} Extra round

=== 2014 Glory Featherweight Contender Tournament bracket ===
Semi-finals
(Canada) Gabriel Varga	DEC
(Thailand) Yodkhunpon Sitmonchai	3-0
(United States) Shane Oblonsky	DEC
(Brazil) Marcus Vinicius	3-0

Final
(Canada) Gabriel Varga	DEC
(United States) Shane Oblonsky	3-0

== Glory 18: Oklahoma ==
Glory 18: Oklahoma
- Promotion: Glory
- Date: November 7, 2014
- Venue: Grand Casino Hotel Resort
- City: (United States) Shawnee, Oklahoma, USA
- Attendance: 1,163

Event chronology
Glory 17: Los Angeles	Glory 18: Oklahoma	Glory 19: Virginia

Glory 18: Oklahoma was a kickboxing event, held on November 7, 2014 at the Grand Casino Hotel Resort in Shawnee, Oklahoma, USA.

=== Background ===
This event featured world title fight for the Glory Lightweight Championship of Davit Kiria vs. Robin van Roosmalen as a headliner and a middleweight fight of Wayne Barrett vs. Jason Wilnis as co-headliner. Also this event featured a 4-Man Light Heavyweight Contender Tournament, where the winner earns the right to fight for the Glory Light Heavyweight World Title. Additionally, the winner of the Benjamin Adegbuyi vs. Hesdy Gerges fight gets a heavyweight title shot.

It had average of 352,000 and peak of 648,000 viewers on Spike TV.

=== Results ===
Main Card (Spike)
Weight Class				Method	Round	Time	Notes
Light Heavyweight	(Brazil) Saulo Cavalari	def.	(Democratic Republic of the Congo) Zack Mwekassa	KO (high kick)	3	0:20	Light Heavyweight Contender Tournament Final
Lightweight	(Netherlands) Robin van Roosmalen	def.	(Georgia (country)) Davit Kiria (c)	Decision (majority)	5	3:00	For the Lightweight Championship
Middleweight	(Netherlands) Jason Wilnis	def.	(United States) Wayne Barrett	Decision (unanimous)	3	3:00
Light Heavyweight	(Brazil) Saulo Cavalari	def.	(Germany) Danyo Ilunga ^{1}	Decision (unanimous)	3	3:00	Light Heavyweight Contender Tournament Semi Final
Light Heavyweight	(Democratic Republic of the Congo) Zack Mwekassa	def.	(United States) Brian Collette	KO (punch)	2	0:45	Light Heavyweight Contender Tournament Semi Final
Superfight Series
Heavyweight	(Romania) Benjamin Adegbuyi	def.	(Netherlands) Hesdy Gerges	Decision (unanimous)	3	3:00	Heavyweight Title eliminator
Light Heavyweight	(United States) Randy Blake	def.	(United States) Warren Thompson	Decision (unanimous)	3	3:00
Middleweight	(Canada) Robert Thomas	def.	(United States) Mike Lemaire	KO (right hooks)	3	1:06
Lightweight	(Canada) Josh Jauncey	def.	(South Korea) Jae-Gil Noh	KO (body punch/knee to the head)	2	1:14
Welterweight	(United States) Omari Boyd	def.	(United States) Ian Alexander	TKO (referee stoppage)	3	2:17

^{1} Andrei Stoica was replaced with Artem Vakhitov.
^{1} Artem Vakhitov was replaced with Danyo Ilunga.

=== 2014 Glory Light Heavyweight Contender Tournament bracket ===
Semi-finals
(United States) Brian Collette	2R.
(Democratic Republic of the Congo) Zack Mwekassa	KO
(Brazil) Saulo Cavalari	DEC
(Germany) Danyo Ilunga	3-0

Final
(Democratic Republic of the Congo) Zack Mwekassa	3R.
(Brazil) Saulo Cavalari	KO
