= World Combat League =

Martial arts promoter

- Company type: Private
- Industry: Kickboxing promotion
- Founder: Chuck Norris
- Headquarters: Dallas, Texas, United States
- Key people: Chuck Norris, President Cory Schafer, Commissioner; Jeff Duclos, Media Contact Jacob Bonnema, Fmr. Owner & Director of Marketing
- Parent: World Combat League, Inc.
- Website: www.wcl.com

The World Combat League (WCL) was a full contact, team-based kickboxing promotion. It was founded by movie star and martial artist Chuck Norris.

== Rules ==
The rules are typical of other full contact striking competitions, with some minor variation.

Any striking techniques from Boxing, International-Style Kickboxing, and Full-Contact Karate were allowed.

In order to maintain the fast pace of the action, clinching, holding or ground fighting (grappling) were prohibited.

=== Weight divisions ===
This represents the maximum weight for each of the men's division.

- 147 lbs
- 164 lbs
- 178 lbs
- 195 lbs
- 235+ lbs
- 128+ lbs for women.

For the fighter weigh-in, there is a window of several pounds that must be met to qualify. For example, the 195 lbs division fighters are required to weight between 178 and 195, whereas the 235 lbs weight division must weigh between 195 and 235 lbs.

=== Ring ===
The no-rope ring (sometimes referred by fans as "the pit") is a circle which is 27 feet in diameter, of which the inner 24 feet is colored blue. The next 3 feet is yellow, which is the caution area. When the fighter gets to the yellow area, he knows he's getting close to stepping out-of-bounds. The last edge of the ring is the red zone, which features a 30-degree upward angle. When a fighter steps on the red area, he's stepping up slightly, letting him know he's out-of-bounds.

=== Time ===
Each match is two rounds in duration, with each round lasting three minutes. After the fighters complete their first round, the next two fighters begin their first round. After each set of fighters has completed his or her first round, then halftime is called before the first set of fighters begin their second round. This gives each fighter about 20 minutes between rounds so he or she can fight full speed for the entire time allowed.

=== Attire ===
All competitors must fight in approved team pants, with gloves and shinguards. No boots or shoes are allowed as of the 2006-2007 season, though fighters originally wore boots.

=== Allowed techniques ===
- Punching - Jab, Cross, Hook, Uppercut, and Spinning Backfist. No elbows or forearms allowed.
- Kicking - Front-Kicks, Side Kicks, Back Kicks, Hook Kicks, Roundhouse Kicks, Wheel Kicks, Spinning Kicks.
- Kneeing - Front and Roundhouse. Must be above the waist.

=== Fouls ===
- No Throws
- No Takedowns
- No Holding - Grabbing the opponent's body in an effort to stop them from attacking or countering. However, fighters may grab to immediately throw a knee. (i.e. they may not clinch and jockey for knee strike position.)
- Limited Clinching - Fighters may clinch and throw one knee but then must release.
- No Low Kicks - Leg kicks are allowed to the support leg as well as the lead leg, but must be at least three inches above the knee.
- No Stalling - Intentionally delaying the action of a contest in any way.
- No Passivity - Retreating or circling without striking - or fighting only when the opponent attacks.

=== Starting the team contest ===
Both teams will enter the ring and stand with each team member facing their opponent. The referee will administer the pre-fight instructions and execute the "coin toss". The coach of the team who wins the coin toss is allowed to select which fighter will start the contest. If the coach chooses his middleweight, for example, then he and the opposing team's middleweight will stay in the ring for a match while the remaining fighters retire to the "fighter's pen" (a warm-up area close to the ring).

=== Judging criteria ===
Each match within the team contest only lasts for three minutes, so each fighter is encouraged to fight constantly in order to earn as many points for their team as possible. Three judges score each fight based on knockdowns, extent of damage inflicted, and the volume of clean-scoring strikes landed. Each judge will award five points to the fighter they see as superior, and four or less points to the opponent. The judges points are combined at the end of each fight (15 points maximum, not counting penalties), and are then added to the teams overall total from the previous fights. The team with the most points at the end of the second half wins.

=== Match conduct ===
The referee has the right to stop the fighters if a fighter cannot defend himself intelligently, the fights goes out-of-bounds (the red zone), a fighter is downed, or the opponents are holding. Fighters are expected to follow the referees instructions at all times or be disqualified, which results in the maximum points being awarded to the winner (same as a KO). In addition, the three-knockdown rule is in effect (three knockdowns in a round results in a technical knockout) as well as a mandatory eight count on all knockdowns.

=== Match outcome ===
At the end of each fight the judge's scores will be announced, and added to the total points awarded from the previous fights. Referee-awarded penalty points are added to the cumulative team score when they occur.

== Television ==
The World Combat League was originally televised on the Versus network, which was formerly known as OLN. As of Season 2, the WCL will be aired in over 100 countries. On December 1, 2009 ALN announced that they would start airing episodes of the Chuck Norris World Combat League.

== WCL Championships ==
2007-2008 Championship Results

Winner	Loser	Score
LA Stars	New York Clash	137-133

2006-2007 Championship Results

Winner	Loser	Score
Houston Enforcers	Miami Force	139-131

== Notable Fighters ==
- Andreas Spång
- Raymond Daniels
- Stephen Thompson
- Uriah Hall
- Felice Herrig
- Pat Barry
- Jarrell Miller
- Chris Algieri
