= Bogdan Stoica =

Romanian professional kickboxer

- Born: Bogdan Cristian Stoica; January 28, 1990 (age 36); Bucharest, Romania
- Other names: Bucharest Bad Boy; The Flying Knee
- Height: 1.93 m (6 ft 4 in)
- Weight: 100 kg (220 lb; 16 st)
- Division: Heavyweight
- Reach: 75.0 in (191 cm)
- Style: Wushu, Kickboxing
- Fighting out of: Bucharest, Romania
- Team: Stoica Brothers Fight Academy
- Trainer: Andrei Ochi Mircea

Professional boxing record
- Total: 1
- Wins: 1
- By knockout: 1
- Losses: 0
- Draws: 0

Kickboxing record
- Total: 80
- Wins: 61
- By knockout: 42
- Losses: 19
- By knockout: 9
- Draws: 0

Mixed martial arts record
- Total: 1
- Wins: 0
- Losses: 1
- By submission: 1

Other information
- Notable relatives: Andrei Stoica, brother

Instagram information
- Page: b.stoica
- Years active: 2014 – present
- Followers: 66 thousand (January 19, 2024)
- Last updated on: November 16, 2025

Bogdan Stoica
Medal record

Wushu

(Romania) Romanian National Championship
Gold medal – first place	2010 București	Qingda -85 kg

(Romania) Romanian National Championship
Gold medal – first place	2009 București	Qingda -80 kg

Bogdan Cristian Stoica (born January 28, 1990) is a Romanian professional kickboxer and boxer, and former wushu practitioner. Stoica is also one-time SUPERKOMBAT Cruiserweight Champion, one-time Enfusion Light Heavyweight and two-time wushu national champion. He was also ranked as a top-10 middleweight in the world for several years by LiverKick.com, CombatPress.com and GloryKickboxing.com. He has competed for GLORY, ONE Championship, SUPERKOMBAT Fighting Championship, Enfusion, Wu Lin Feng and K-1.

As of 16 January 2019, Stoica was ranked the #1 light-heavyweight in the world by Enfusion Live. As of February 1, 2025, he is #9 in the GLORY light-heavyweight rankings.

Bogdan is known to wear shorts with extra slits on his shorts for better movement. He is also known for his flying kicks, knee attacks and axe-kick, a kick that is characterized by a straightened leg descending onto an opponent like the blade of an axe.

== Background ==
Stoica is the grandson of a former boxer.

He has been training in Bucharest, Romania for his entire career. Stoica first went to Respect Gym, which was run by Alin Panaite, where he trained with fellow kickboxers Andrei Stoica, Benjamin Adegbuyi, Claudiu Bădoi, Ciprian Șchiopu and Florin Lupu.

In 2018, he opened his own gym (Stoica Brothers Fight Academy), and since then he has been training there also under the guidance of the boxing coach Andrei Mircea.

== Kickboxing career ==
=== Early career ===
Bogdan Stoica made his SUPERKOMBAT debut against the brother of Dževad Poturak, Dženan, with a knockout in an event which took place in Sibiu, Romania. In February 2011, he scored smashing first-round knockout over experienced Muay Thai fighter trained by Remy Bonjasky, Fred Sikking, which was the biggest win of his kickboxing career. This loss earned Sikking the second KO of his career in over 50 fights. The event took place in Sofia, Bulgaria.

=== Intercontinental champion ===
On May 21, Stoica won the WAKO-PRO Intercontinental -88.6 kg Championship (K-1 rules). He landed a right knee to the head of Pacôme Assi in the third. The Frenchman took a standing eight count and the bout was summarily called off by the referee.

=== Fastest knockout in the Local Kombat ===
At "Bodyguardul - Forţele Speciale", he won the fight via quick knockout, the referee pulling Stoica away from Đurđević at around the 8 second mark.

=== World champion ===
He won the vacant SUPERKOMBAT Cruiserweight Championship by defeating WBC Muay Thai champion Ivan Stanić. Stoica looked outstanding, dropping Stanić 3 times en route to winning the belt and landing some beautiful flying knees. The Romanian even flew over the top rope and out of the ring with a flying knee attempt. Stanić showed heart by coming forward the whole time but Stoica closed his eye and took over, winning a unanimous decision in completely overwhelming fashion.

=== Motorcycle injury ===
On July 18, 2012, Stoica was struck by a car coming out from the side. He tried to avoid contact by veering sharply away from the car and ended up slamming into the asphalt. The accident caused him a severe back injury. After a week or so, Stoica was out of the hospital. His full recovery could take up to six months. He resumed training in November 2012.

=== Return ===
He was set to make K-1 debut on his return to the ring in 2013. He instead made a successful comeback by knocking out Romano Romasco in round two at SUPERKOMBAT World Grand Prix I 2013 in Oradea, Romania on April 6.

Stoica will beat Iranian veteran and gold medalist at World Martial Arts Festival, Eisa Ramezani, by unanimous decision at SUPERKOMBAT New Heroes 4 in Dubai, UAE on May 31, 2013.

He defeated Marsan Yohan via TKO due to a cut in just 25 seconds at SUPERKOMBAT New Heroes 5 in Târgoviște, Romania on August 30, 2013.

He KOed Amir Zeyada in round one at SUPERKOMBAT World Grand Prix IV 2013 in Giurgiu, Romania on October 12.

He lost the SUPERKOMBAT Cruiserweight Championship against Igor Bugaenko when he lost by unanimous decision at the SUPERKOMBAT World Grand Prix 2013 Final in Galați, Romania on December 21.

Stoica lost to Lorenzo Javier Jorge at SUPERKOMBAT New Heroes 7 Ploiești, Romania on March 29, 2014.

It was announced during the Glory 15: Istanbul broadcast that Stoica would be one of eight fighters competing in the Glory 17: Los Angeles - Last Man Standing middleweight tournament in Inglewood, California, United States on June 21, 2014. Stoica was knocked out by Wayne Barrett in round three of their quarterfinal match when the American countered one of his patented flying knees with a vicious left hook.

On October 25, 2014, he made his return to the SUPERKOMBAT. For this match, Stoica faced Aristote Quitusisa at SUPERKOMBAT World Grand Prix 2014 Final Elimination in the season five quarter-finals match up. He lost the fight via unanimous decision.

=== Back on track ===
Respect Gym's Bogdan Stoica met Alexandru Negrea in a reserve match for the Light Heavyweight Tournament on November 22, 2014 at SUPERKOMBAT World Grand Prix 2014 Final. Stoica won the fight via KO in the third round.

Stoica next faced Zinedine Hameur-Lain on March 7, 2015 at SUPERKOMBAT World Grand Prix I 2015. He won the match against Hameur-Lain in the first-round via KO.

He faced İbrahim Giydirir on 23 May 2015 at SUPERKOMBAT World Grand Prix II 2015. Stoica dominated his opponent, winning via unanimous decision.

Stoica stopped Horace Martin in second round on June 13, 2015 at SUPERKOMBAT Special Edition.

On August 1, 2015, at SUPERKOMBAT World Grand Prix IV 2015 Stoica and Fabio Kwasi were involved in a battle that was very close and ended in a split decision in favor of Bogdan Stoica.

In a fight of SUPERKOMBAT World Grand Prix 2015 Final Elimination at Gran Teatro Linear4Ciak, he won his sixth straight fight with a unanimous decision over Patrick Veenstra.

=== Another injury ===
On October 18, 2015, Bogdan Stoica lost to Ibrahim El Bouni after being forced to withdraw due to knee injury at WFL "Unfinished Business" in Hoofddorp, Netherlands. The knee injury is expected to keep him out of action for about six weeks.

=== Enfusion World Title ===
He won the Enfusion -95 Kg World Title on 27 October 2018 in Oberhausen, Germany.

Stoica missed the entire 2019 due to injury. He also required hand surgery.

=== ONE Championship ===
In May 2020, he signed a contract with ONE Championship. After over two years away from the sport, Stoica was scheduled to fight the two-time ISKA Germany Champion Rinor Latifaj at Dynamite Fighting Show 10. Stoica won the fight by unanimous decision.

Stoica was scheduled to face John Granville at OSS Fighters 06 on July 16, 2021. He won the fight by a second-round technical knockout.

Stoica faced Beybulat Isaev at ONE Championship: NextGen on October 29, 2021. He lost the fight by unanimous decision.

== Mixed martial arts career ==
Stoica made his mixed martial arts debut at XTB KSW 83: Colosseum 2 on June 3, 2023 against Arkadiusz Wrzosek. He lost the bout via forearm choke in the first round.

== Championships and accomplishments ==
=== Kickboxing ===
- K-1
  - K-1 WORLD GP 2026 -90kg World Championship Tournament 3rd place
- Dynamite Fighting Show
  - 2021 Comeback of the Year nomination
  - 2021 Most Popular Fighter of the Year nomination
- Enfusion
  - Enfusion Light Heavyweight Championship -95 kg/209 lb (One time, current)
- SUPERKOMBAT Fighting Championship
  - SUPERKOMBAT Cruiserweight Championship -92 kg/202.8 lb (One time)
  - Youngest fighter to win a SUPERKOMBAT championship (22 years, 105 days)
  - 2011 Breakthrough Fighter of the Year
  - First SUPERKOMBAT Cruiserweight Champion
  - Fastest Knockout in SUPERKOMBAT History (0:08)
- World Association of Kickboxing Organizations
  - WAKO Pro Intercontinental Cruiserweight Championship -88.6 kg (K-1 rules) (One time)
- Full Fight
  - Full Fight -82.0 kg Championship (One time)
- World Kickboxing and Karate Union
  - WKU Cruiserweight Championship -90 kg (One time, current)
- Kickboxing Romania Awards
  - 2023 Best Debut vs. Luis Tavares at Glory 89

=== Wushu ===
- Romanian National Wushu Championship
  - Romanian National Qingda Light Heavyweight Championship (One time)
  - Romanian National Qingda Cruiserweight Championship (One time)

== Professional Kickboxing record ==
Kickboxing Record
61 wins (42 KOs), 19 losses
Date	Result	Opponent	Event	Location	Method	Round	Record
2026-12-05		(Italy) Mattia Faraoni	Oktagon 30th Anniversary	Rome, Italy			
For the ISKA Unified rules World title.
2026-09-12	Loss	(Russia) Maxim Baklanov	K-1 World MAX 2026 - World Tournament Opening Round	Tokyo, Japan	KO (Calf kick)	1	1:45
2026-04-03	Win	(Togo) Gerardo Atti	Dynamite Fighting Show 30	Bucharest, Romania	Decision (Unanimous)	3	3:00
2026-02-08	Loss	(Germany) Lukas Achterberg	K-1 World GP 2026 - 90kg World Championship Tournament, Semifinals	Tokyo, Japan	TKO (2 Knockdowns)	1	1:46
2026-02-08	Win	(Italy) Mattia Faraoni	K-1 World GP 2026 - 90kg World Championship Tournament, Quarterfinals	Tokyo, Japan	KO (Left hook)	2	2:40
2025-11-15	Win	(Germany) Daniel Dörrer	Sanda Pro Fight	Burgas, Bulgaria	KO (flying knee)	1	0:48
2025-03-07	Loss	(Cape Verde) Iuri Fernandes	DFS 26	Râmnicu Vâlcea, Romania	Decision (Split)	3	3:00
2024-10-12	Loss	(Morocco) Ibrahim El Bouni	Glory 96	Rotterdam, Netherlands	Ext.R Decision (Unanimous)	4	3:00
2024-06-08	Loss	(Lithuania) Sergej Maslobojev	Glory Light Heavyweight Grand Prix, Quarterfinals	Rotterdam, Netherlands	TKO (fractured arm/injury)	1	58-15
2023-11-18	Loss	(Italy) Mattia Faraoni	Oktagon 2023	Turin, Italy	TKO (retirement/leg injury)	2	58-14
For the ISKA Oriental rules World Super Cruiserweight Championship.
2023-10-07	Win	(Cape Verde) Luis Tavares	Glory 89	Burgas, Bulgaria	Decision (unanimous)	3	58-13
2023-03-12	Win	(Germany) Vladimir Toktasynov	Dynamite Fighting Show 18	Timișoara, Romania	KO (flying knee)	2	57-13
2022-06-24	Win	(Senegal) Sam Tevette	Dynamite Fighting Show 15	Buzău, Romania	Decision (unanimous)	3	56–13
2022-05-06	Win	(Netherlands) Badr Ferdaous	Dynamite Fighting Show 14	Bucharest, Romania	TKO (three knockdowns)	1	55-13
2021-10-29	Loss	(Russia) Beybulat Isaev	ONE Championship: NextGen	Kallang, Singapore	Decision (unanimous)	3	54–13
2021-07-16	Win	(Netherlands) John Granville	OSS Fighters 06	Constanța, Romania	TKO (doctor stoppage)	2	54-12
2021-03-10	Win	(Germany) Rinor Latifaj	Dynamite Fighting Show 10	Bucharest, Romania	Decision (unanimous)	3	53-12
2018-10-27	Win	(Belgium) Levi Kuyken	Enfusion 73	Oberhausen, Germany	TKO (three knockdowns)	3	52-12
Won the Enfusion Light Heavyweight Championship.
2018-08-24	Loss	(China) Hao Guanghua	GFC 5: Romania vs. China II	Mamaia, Romania	DQ (illegal knee)	3	51-12
2018-04-20	Win	(Lithuania) Mantas Rimdeika	OSS Fighters 01	Constanța, Romania	Decision (unanimous)	3	51-11
2018-03-25	Loss	(Morocco) Ibrahim El Bouni	WFL: El Bouni vs. Stoica, Final 16	Almere, Netherlands	Decision (unanimous)	3	50-11
2017-10-16	Win	(Turkey) Fatih Karakuş	Colosseum Tournament 4	Bucharest, Romania	KO (right low kick)	1	50-10
2017-06-16	Win	(China) Hao Guanghua	GFC 2: Romania vs. China	Timișoara, Romania	Decision (split)	3	49-10
2017-05-06	Win	(Spain) David Trallero	Mix Fight 31	Valencia, Spain	Decision (unanimous)	3	48-10
2016-10-01	Loss	(Nigeria) Israel Adesanya	Glory of Heroes 5	Zhengzhou, China	TKO (body kick)	2	47-10
2016-07-02	Loss	(Croatia) Antonio Plazibat	Respect World Series 2	London, England	TKO (injury)	2	47-9
2016-05-07	Win	(United States) James Phillips	Showdown Fight Night II	Mannheim, Germany	KO (right knee to the body)	2	47-8
Won the WKU Cruiserweight Championship.
2016-03-19	Win	(Serbia) Bojan Džepina	Respect World Series 1	Madrid, Spain	TKO (doctor stoppage)	1	46-8
2015-12-12	Win	(Spain) Damian Garcia	SUPERKOMBAT In The Cage	Turin, Italy	KO (right hook)	3	45-8
2015-10-18	Loss	(Morocco) Ibrahim El Bouni	WFL "Unfinished Business"	Hoofddorp, Netherlands	TKO (injury)	1	44-8
2015-10-02	Win	(Netherlands) Patrick Veenstra	SUPERKOMBAT World Grand Prix 2015 Final Elimination	Milan, Italy	Decision (unanimous)	3	44-7
2015-08-01	Win	(Netherlands) Fabio Kwasi	SUPERKOMBAT World Grand Prix IV 2015	Mamaia, Romania	Decision (split)	3	43-7
2015-06-13	Win	(Jamaica) Horace Martin	SUPERKOMBAT Special Edition	Spreitenbach, Switzerland	TKO (referee stoppage)	2	42-7
SUPERKOMBAT Cruiserweight Championship eliminator.
2015-05-23	Win	(Turkey) İbrahim Giydirir	SUPERKOMBAT World Grand Prix II 2015	Bucharest, Romania	Decision (unanimous)	3	41-7
2015-03-07	Win	(France) Zinedine Hameur-Lain	SUPERKOMBAT World Grand Prix I 2015	Ploiești, Romania	KO (right hook)	1	40-7
2014-11-22	Win	(Italy) Alexandru Negrea	SUPERKOMBAT World Grand Prix 2014 Final, Reserve Bout	Monza, Italy	KO (left uppercut)	3	39-7
2014-10-25	Loss	(France) Aristote Quitusisa	SUPERKOMBAT World Grand Prix 2014 Final Elimination, Quarter Finals	Geneva, Switzerland	Decision (majority)	3	38-7
2014-06-21	Loss	(United States) Wayne Barrett	Glory 17: Los Angeles - Middleweight Last Man Standing Tournament, Quarter Finals	Inglewood, California, USA	KO (left hook/cut)	3	38-6
2014-03-29	Loss	(Spain) Jorge Loren	SUPERKOMBAT New Heroes 7	Ploiești, Romania	Decision (unanimous)	3	38-5
2013-12-21	Loss	(Belarus) Igor Bugaenko	SUPERKOMBAT World Grand Prix 2013 Final	Galați, Romania	Decision (unanimous)	3	38-4
Lost the SUPERKOMBAT Cruiserweight Championship.
2013-10-12	Win	(Egypt) Amir Zeyada	SUPERKOMBAT World Grand Prix IV 2013	Giurgiu, Romania	KO (left hook)	1	38-3
2013-08-30	Win	(France) Yohan Marsan	SUPERKOMBAT New Heroes 5	Târgoviște, Romania	TKO (cut)	1	37-3
2013-05-31	Win	(Iran) Eisa Ramezani	SUPERKOMBAT New Heroes 4	Dubai, UAE	Decision (unanimous)	3	36-3
2013-04-06	Win	(Italy) Romano Romasco	SUPERKOMBAT World Grand Prix I 2013	Oradea, Romania	KO (right hook)	2	35-3
2012-05-12	Win	(Croatia) Ivan Stanić	SUPERKOMBAT World Grand Prix II 2012	Cluj-Napoca, Romania	Decision (unanimous)	3	34-3
Won the inaugural SUPERKOMBAT Cruiserweight Championship.
2012-03-30	Win	(Serbia) Andi Đurđević	Local Kombat: Bodyguardul - Forţe Speciale	Târgu Jiu, Romania	KO (left high kick)	1	33-3
2011-11-19	Win	(Germany) Dawid Baziak	SUPERKOMBAT World Grand Prix 2011 Final	Darmstadt, Germany	TKO (doctor stoppage)	3	32-3
2011-10-15	Win	(Netherlands) Leon Miedema	SUPERKOMBAT World Grand Prix IV 2011	Piatra Neamț, Romania	Decision (unanimous)	3	31-3
2011-07-16	Loss	(Turkey) Hakan Aksoy	SUPERKOMBAT World Grand Prix II 2011	Constanța, Romania	TKO (injury)	2	30-3
2011-05-21	Win	(France) Pacôme Assi	SUPERKOMBAT World Grand Prix I 2011	Bucharest, Romania	TKO (corner stoppage)	3	30-2
Won the WAKO Pro Intercontinental Cruiserweight Championship (K-1 rules).
2011-03-18	Win	(Italy) Lelio Ramunni	WAKO-PRO World Grand Prix 2011: Romania vs. Italy	Râmnicu Vâlcea, Romania	Decision (unanimous)	3	29-2
2011-02-18	Win	(Netherlands) Fred Sikking	Real Pain Challenge: Rising Force	Sofia, Bulgaria	KO (right hook)	1	28-2
2010-11-20	Win	(Bosnia and Herzegovina) Dženan Poturak	Local Kombat: "10 ani în RING"	Sibiu, Romania	KO (right hook)	2	27-2
2010-10-15	Win	(Romania) Vasile Popovici	RFC Slobozia	Slobozia, Romania	Decision	3	26-2
2010-07-24	Win	(Romania) Sebastian Horeica	Selecţie Local Kombat	Constanța, Romania	TKO (doctor stoppage)	3	25-2
Won the Local Kombat selection.
2010-07-24	Win	(Romania) Viorel Butnaru	Selecţie Local Kombat	Constanța, Romania	Decision	4	24-2
2010-06-05	Loss	(Romania) Sebastian Horeica	RFC Craiova	Craiova, Romania	Decision	3	23-2
2010-05-13	Win	(Romania) Sebastian Horeica	Local Kombat: "Se caută un greu"	Sibiu, Romania	TKO (doctor stoppage)	1	23-1
2009-12-18	Win	(Romania) Sorin Radu	Klash "Noua Generație"	Sibiu, Romania	TKO (corner stoppage)	2	22-1
2009-07-10	Win	(Romania) Daniel Lazăr	Full Fight XVII	Râmnicu Vâlcea, Romania	KO (knee to the head)	3	21-1
Won the Full Fight Middleweight Tournament.
2009-06-05	Win	(Romania) Boris Vadim Grîu	Full Fight XV, Finals	Timișoara, Romania	Decision	3	20-1
2009-06-05	Win	(Romania) Nicolae Nuțu	Full Fight XV, Semi Finals	Timișoara, Romania	KO (spinning back kick)	2	19-1
Legend: Win Loss Draw/No contest Notes

== Mixed martial arts record ==
Professional record breakdown
1 match	0 wins	1 loss
By submission	0	1

Res.	Record	Opponent	Method	Event	Date	Round	Time	Location	Notes
Loss	0–1	Arkadiusz Wrzosek	Submission (forearm choke)	KSW 83: Colosseum 2	June 3, 2023	1	2:09	Warsaw, Poland	

== Professional boxing record ==
1 fight	1 win	0 losses
By knockout	1	0
By decision	0	0
Draws	0	

No.	Result	Record	Opponent	Type	Round, time	Date	Location	Notes
1	Win	1–0	(Venezuela) José Manuel Núñez	KO	1	30 July 2021	Sala Constantin Jude, Timișoara, Romania	

== Personal life ==
He is married and has two daughters, Francesca Antonia (b. 2016) and Yasmina Maria (b. 2019).

== See also ==
- List of male kickboxers
