= Marc de Bonte =

Belgian kickboxer

- Born: 27 February 1990; Turnhout, Belgium
- Died: 5 November 2016 (aged 26)
- Nationality: Belgian
- Height: 1.88 m (6 ft 2 in)
- Weight: 77 kg (170 lb; 12.1 st)
- Division: Welterweight; Light Heavyweight; Cruiserweight
- Reach: 73.0 in (185 cm)
- Style: Kickboxing, Muay Thai
- Stance: Orthodox
- Fighting out of: Bladel, Netherlands
- Team: Tay Gym
- Trainer: Ludo Kaethoven
- Years active: 2008 - 2016

Professional boxing record
- Total: 4
- Wins: 4
- By knockout: 2
- Losses: 0
- Draws: 0

Kickboxing record
- Total: 100
- Wins: 87
- By knockout: 28
- Losses: 12
- Draws: 1

Other information
- Website: www.marcdebonte.com
- Last updated on: 21 June 2014

Marc de Bonte
Medal record

Representing Belgium

Muay Thai

IFMA World Championships
Bronze medal – third place	2010 Bangkok	81 kg
Silver medal – second place	2012 Saint Petersburg	81 kg

Marc de Bonte (27 February 1990 – 5 November 2016) was a Belgian kickboxer who held the Glory Welterweight World Title.

== Career ==
De Bonte began practicing kickboxing and Muay Thai at six years old. As an amateur, he took a bronze medal at the 2010 IFMA World Championships in Bangkok, Thailand. He followed this up with a silver at the 2012 games in Saint Petersburg, Russia where he lost to Artem Levin in the final.

In 2011, he signed with the Muaythai Premier League. Still, he was able to fight just once in the short-lived promotion, a split decision win over Jiri Zak at Muaythai Premier League: Strength and Honor in Padova, Italy on 8 October 2011.

He knocked out Michael Buxant via a fifth round knee at MaxPain in Genk, Belgium on 10 February 2012 to win the Belgian −81 kg/181 lb Championship.

The following year, de Bonte was recruited by Glory, the world's premier kickboxing organization. He made his promotional debut at Glory 2: Brussels on 6 October 2012 in Brussels, Belgium where he lost to Murthel Groenhart by knockout from a knee in round two of their 79 kg/175 lb bout.

He returned at Glory 6: Istanbul in Istanbul, Turkey on 6 April 2013, moving up to the 85 kg/187 lb division to face L'houcine "Aussie" Ouzgni. He won via a knee KO early in round one to move up to the #3 spot in Glory's middleweight rankings.

He was set to fight Nieky Holzken in the Glory 13: Tokyo - Welterweight World Championship Tournament semi-finals in Tokyo, Japan on 21 December 2013. However, he was then replaced by Raymond Daniels in the tournament for undisclosed reasons.

He was set to fight against Nieky Holzken for the inaugural Glory Welterweight (-77.1 kg/170 lb) Championship at Glory 14: Zagreb in Zagreb, Croatia on 8 March 2014 but the fight was cancelled when Holzken suffered a shoulder injury in a car accident. The match was rescheduled for Glory 16: Denver in Broomfield, Colorado, US on 3 May 2014 but Holzken withdrew once again due to his recurring shoulder injury and was replaced by Karapet Karapetyan. De Bonte defeated Karapetyan via a split decision to take the title.

He lost his title against Joseph Valtellini at Glory 17: Los Angeles in Inglewood, California, US on 21 June 2014 when he dropped a unanimous decision. Both fighters scored knockdowns in the fight; Valtellini dropped de Bonte with a high kick in round three, while de Bonte floored Valtellini with a flying knee in round four.

== Missing person case and death ==
On the night of 4 November 2016 De Bonte attended a party organized by the gym he worked at in Bladel, Netherlands. He left the party and texted his girlfriend, telling her he would stop by a friend for a drink in Turnhout, Belgium, before going to her place in Best, the Netherlands. De Bonte never arrived at his girlfriend's place and he was reported missing by his family. His car was found next to the Wilhelmina Canal, a canal which runs through Best, Netherlands. Extensive police searches in the Netherlands and Belgium did not lead to any clues on De Bonte's whereabouts. On 24 November De Bonte's body was discovered floating in the Wilhelmina Canal in Oirschot, not far from the place where his car was discovered. The cause of death has not been determined yet, with the autopsy having taken place on 26 November.

== Championships and accomplishments ==
=== Kickboxing ===
- Glory
  - Glory Welterweight (-77kg/170lb) Championship (one time; first)
- Belgian Kickboxing
  - Belgian −81 kg/181 lb Championship
- International Federation of Muaythai Amateur
  - 2010 IFMA World Championships −81 kg/178 lb bronze medalist (bronze)
  - 2012 IFMA World Championships −81 kg/178 lb silver medalist (silver)

== Boxing record ==
Boxing record
1 win (0 KOs), 0 losses, 0 draws
Date	Result	Opponent	Venue	Location	Method	Round	Time	Record
2011-11-11	Win	Antonio Manuel	Sporthal Arena, Deurne	Antwerp, Belgium	Decision (unanimous)	4	3:00	1–0
Legend: Win Loss Draw/no contest Notes

== Kickboxing record (incomplete) ==
Kickboxing record
87 wins (28 (T)KOs), 12 losses, 1 draw, 0 no contests
Date	Result	Opponent	Event	Location	Method	Round	Time
2016-09-10	Win	(Latvia) Artur Gorlov	Kunlun Fight 51 - 80 kg 2016 Tournament Quarter-Finals	Fuzhou, China	TKO	3	
Qualified to Kunlun Fight 80 kg 2016 Tournament Final 4.
2014-06-21	Loss	(Canada) Joseph Valtellini	Glory 17: Los Angeles	Inglewood, California, USA	Decision (unanimous)	5	3:00
Loses the Glory Welterweight Championship.
2014-05-03	Win	(Armenia) Karapet Karapetyan	Glory 16: Denver	Broomfield, Colorado, USA	Decision (split)	5	3:00
Wins the Glory Welterweight Championship.
2013-04-06	Win	(Morocco) L'houcine Ouzgni	Glory 6: Istanbul	Istanbul, Turkey	KO (left knee)	1	1:16
2012-10-06	Loss	(Netherlands) Murthel Groenhart	Glory 2: Brussels	Brussels, Belgium	KO (knee)	2	
2012-02-10	Win	(Belgium) Michael Buxant	MaxPain	Genk, Belgium	KO (knee)	5	
Wins the Belgian −81 kg/181 lb Championship.
2011-10-08	Win	(Czech Republic) Jiri Zak	Muaythai Premier League: Strength and Honor	Padova, Italy	Decision (split)	3	3:00
2011-04-09	Win	(Turkey) Fikri Demirci	A1 World Combat Cup	Eindhoven, Netherlands	Decision	3	3:00
2010-11-21	Win	(Netherlands) Joep Beerepoot		Zaandam, Netherlands			
2010-00-00	Win	Michael Smit		Belgium	Decision	3	3:00
2008-01-19	Win	(Netherlands) Geronimo de Groot	Heat FC	Heesch, Netherlands	Decision	3	2:00

Amateur kickboxing record
Date	Result	Opponent	Event	Location	Method	Round	Time
2012-09-11	Loss	(Russia) Artem Levin	IFMA 2012 World Championships, Final	Saint Petersburg, Russia	Decision	4	2:00
Wins the IFMA 2012 World Championships −81 kg/178 lb Silver Medal.
2012-09-11	Win	(France) Kada Bouamama	2012 IFMA World Championships, Semi Finals	Saint Petersburg, Russia			
2012-09-10	Win	(Australia) Kim Olsen	2012 IFMA World Championships, Quarter Finals	Saint Petersburg, Russia			
Legend: Win Loss Draw/no contest Notes
