= Dmitri Bezus =

Ukrainian boxer and kickboxer

Dmytro Bezus
- Born: Dmytro Bezus (укр. Дмитро Безус); March 19, 1989 (age 37); Kharkiv, Ukrainian SSR, Soviet Union
- Native name: Дмитро Безус
- Other names: Bison
- Nationality: Ukrainian
- Height: 2.00 m (6 ft 6 1/2 in)
- Weight: 120 kg (264.6 lb; 18.9 st)
- Division: Heavyweight
- Reach: 78 1/2 in (199 cm)
- Style: Kickboxing, Muay Thai, Savate
- Stance: Orthodox
- Fighting out of: Riga, Latvia
- Trainer: Mr Mohammed ElKabbouri

Professional boxing record
- Total: 12
- Wins: 10
- By knockout: 5
- Losses: 2

Kickboxing record
- Total: 41
- Wins: 30
- Losses: 10
- Draws: 1

Other information
- Boxing record from BoxRec

Dmytro Bezus (Russian: Дмитро Безус; born March 19, 1989), also spelled as Dmitri Bezus, is a Ukrainian heavyweight professional boxer and kickboxer, managed by WKN Top Team. As a kickboxer, Bezus has fought for Kunlun Fight, Glory, and K-1.

In 2019, Bezus began his professional boxing career.

== Titles ==
Professional Kickboxing

- 2014 Kunlun Fight Heavyweight Tournament Runner-Up (silver)
- 2014 Chauss'Fight Savate Professional World Champion (gold)
- 2012 Thai Fight Heavyweight Tournament Runner-Up (silver)
- 2011 UAMA Shoot-Fight Rules Tournament Champion (gold)

Amateur Muay Thai

- 2013 WMF World Thaiboxing Championship (gold)
- 2011 IFMA World Thaiboxing Championship (Uzbekistan) (bronze)
- 2010 IFMA European Thaiboxing Championship (Turkey) (gold)
- 2009 IFMA World Thaiboxing Championship (Thailand) (gold)

== Kickboxing record ==
Professional kickboxing record
30 wins, 10 losses, 1 draw
Date	Result	Opponent	Event	Location	Method	Round	Time
2015-09-26	Draw	(Moldova) Maxim Bolotov	KOK World GP 2015 - Heavyweight Tournament	Chișinău, Moldova	Draw	3	3:00
2014-10-18	Loss	(France) Grégory Tony	Choc Fight Night	Draguignan, France	Decision (unanimous)	5	3:00
For Vacant W.K.N. Kickboxing K-1 World Super Heavyweight title (+96.600 kg).
2014-06-29	Loss	(Belarus) Andrei Gerasimchuk	Kunlun Fight 6, Semi Finals	Chongqing, China	Decision (unanimous)	3	3:00
For Kunlun Fight Heavyweight Tournament Title.
2014-06-29	Win	(Russia) Mikhail Tyuterev	Kunlun Fight 6, Semi Finals	Chongqing, China	Decision (unanimous)	3	3:00
2014-03-08	Loss	(Romania) Benjamin Adegbuyi	GLORY 14	Zagreb, Croatia	TKO (referee stoppage)	2	1:53
2014-01-11	Win	(Netherlands) Jan Siersema	Chauss'Fight	France			
Wins Chauss'Fight Savate professional World Championship.
2013-02-22	Loss	(Belarus) Valentin Slavikovski	Knockout Show	Moscow, Russia	Decision (split)	3	3:00
2012-12-16	Loss	(France) Patrice Quarteron	Thai Fight 2012 Heavyweight Tournament, Final	Bangkok, Thailand	Decision	3	3:00
For The Thai Fight 2012 Heavyweight Tournament title.
2012-12-16	Win	(Canada) James Kouame	Thai Fight 2012 Heavyweight Tournament, Semi Finals	Bangkok, Thailand		3	
2012-11-10	Loss	(Czech Republic) Tomáš Hron	SUPERKOMBAT World Grand Prix 2012 Final Elimination	Craiova, Romania	DQ (illegal spinning elbow)	3	N/A
2012-09-29	Loss	(Poland) Tomasz Szczepkowski	KOK World GP 2012 in Chișinău - Lightweight Tournament, Super Fight	Chișinău, Moldova	Decision	3	3:00
2012-05-26	Loss	(Czech Republic) Tomáš Hron	Profiliga Muaythai 12	Slovakia	Decision (unanimous)	3	3:00
2012-01-21	Win	(Belarus) Oleg Zablodskiy	Tatneft Arena World Cup 2012 2nd selection 1/8 final (+91 kg)	Kazan, Russia	TKO (liver punch)	1	0:55
2011-11-12	Loss	(Morocco) Hicham Ashalhi	Tatneft Arena World Cup 2011 Final (+80 kg)	Kazan, Russia	Decision (unanimous)	6	3:00
For Tatneft Arena World Cup 2011 (+91 kg) title.
2011-07-23	Win	(Belarus) Yuri Dobko	Tatneft Arena World Cup 2011 Semifinal (+80 kg)	Kazan, Russia	KO (low kick)	2	2:52
2011-05-28	Win	(Brazil) Ricardo Christian	Tatneft Arena World Cup 2011 2nd selection 1/4 final (+80 kg)	Kazan, Russia	Decision (unanimous)	4	3:00
2011-02-12	Win	(Portugal) Humberto Evora	Tatneft Arena World Cup 2011 3rd selection 1/8 final (+80 kg)	Kazan, Russia	RTD (broken leg)	1	0:30
2011-01-28	Win	(Ukraine) Anton Chuvasov	UAMA: Warrior's Honor 5, Final	Kharkiv, Ukraine	KO (low kick)		
Wins UAMA Shoot-Fight Rules Tournament Title.
2011-01-28	Win	(Ukraine) Andrey Osadchiy	UAMA: Warrior's Honor 5, Semi Finals	Kharkiv, Ukraine	Decision		
2010-12-29	Loss	(Azerbaijan) Zamig Athakishiyev	RMO Istanbul 2010, Semi Finals	Istanbul, Turkey	Decision	3	3:00
2010-12-29	Loss	(Azerbaijan) Zabit Samedov	RMO Istanbul 2010, Quarter Finals	Istanbul, Turkey	Ext. R. decision	4	3:00
2010-04-30	Loss	(Russia) Ramazan Ramazanov	Tatneft Arena World Cup 2010 1st selection 1/4 final (+80 kg)	Kazan, Russia	Decision (unanimous)	3	3:00
2010-03-28	Loss	(Poland) Tomasz Sarara	K-1 World Grand Prix 2010 in Warsaw, Semi Finals	Warsaw, Poland	Ext.R. decision	3	3:00
2010-03-28	Win	(Netherlands) Rowan Tol	K-1 World Grand Prix 2010 in Warsaw, Quarter Finals	Warsaw, Poland	Ext.R. decision	3	3:00
2010-01-31	Win	(Russia) Elvin Abbasov	Tatneft Arena World Cup 2010 2nd selection 1/8 final (+80 kg)	Kazan, Russia	KO (backfist)	3	
2009-05-23	Loss	(Ukraine) Sergei Lascenko	K-1 World Grand Prix 2009 in Łódź, Semi Finals	Łódź, Poland	TKO (referee stoppage)	1	2:29
2009-05-23	Win	(Poland) Wieslaw Kwasniewski	K-1 World Grand Prix 2009 in Łódź, Reserve Fight	Łódź, Poland	Ext.R. decision (split)	4	3:00
2007-10-20	Win	(Latvia) Konstantin Gluhov	Kickboxing World Cup	Yalta, Ukraine	Decision	3	3:00
Legend: Win Loss Draw/no contest Notes

Amateur Muay Thai record
Date	Result	Opponent	Event	Location	Method	Round	Time
2011-09-25	Loss	(Belarus) Aliaksei Kudzin	2011 IFMA World Championships, Semi Finals	Tashkent, Uzbekistan	Decision	4	2:00
Wins 2011 I.F.M.A. World Muaythai Championships +91kg Bronze Medal.
2009-12-	Win	(Russia) Nadyr Gadzhiev	2009 IFMA World Championships, Final	Bangkok, Thailand	Decision	4	2:00
Wins 2009 IFMA World Championships +91kg Gold Medal.
2009-12-	Win		2009 IFMA World Championships, Semi Finals	Bangkok, Thailand	Decision	4	2:00
Legend: Win Loss Draw/no contest Notes

== Professional boxing record ==
12 fights	10 wins	2 losses
By knockout	5	2
By decision	5	0

No.	Result	Record	Opponent	Type	Round	Date	Location	Notes
12	Loss	10–2	Johnny Fisher	TKO	1 (8), 2:51	3 Feb 2024	The Cosmopolitan of Las Vegas, Chelsea Ballroom, Paradise, Nevada, US	
11	Loss	10–1	David Adeleye	TKO	2 (10), 1:48	17 Feb 2023	York Hall, London, England	For vacant WBO European heavyweight title
10	Win	10–0	Lukas Wacker	TKO	4 (6), 2:59	8 Oct 2022	Arena Riga, Riga, Latvia	
9	Win	9–0	Obidjon Tokhirov	UD	6	29 Jun 2022	Istanbul, Turkey	
8	Win	8–0	Marcelo Nascimento	TKO	2 (8), 2:58	12 Feb 2022	Studio 69, Riga, Latvia	
7	Win	7–0	Ferenc Urban	TKO	1 (6), 2:47	16 Oct 2021	Arena Riga, Riga, Latvia	
6	Win	6–0	Enir Mrkonjic	TKO	2 (6), 0:22	24 Jul 2021	Studio 69, Riga, Latvia	
5	Win	5–0	Pavlo Krolenko	UD	6	11 Apr 2021	AKKO International, Kyiv, Ukraine	
4	Win	4–0	Morgan Dessaux	UD	6	26 Sep 2020	Studio 69, Riga, Latvia	
3	Win	3–0	Pavlo Lukianov	UD	4	1 Aug 2020	Equides Club, Lesniki, Ukraine	
2	Win	2–0	Tamaz Zadishvili	UD	4	25 Jan 2020	Night Club First, Riga, Latvia	
1	Win	1–0	Pawel Sowik	TKO	2 (4), 0:32	2 Nov 2019	Arena Riga, Riga, Latvia	

== See also ==
- List of K-1 events
- List of K-1 champions
- List of male kickboxers
