= Alexander Oleinik (kickboxer) =

Ukrainian kickboxer & Muay Thai fighter

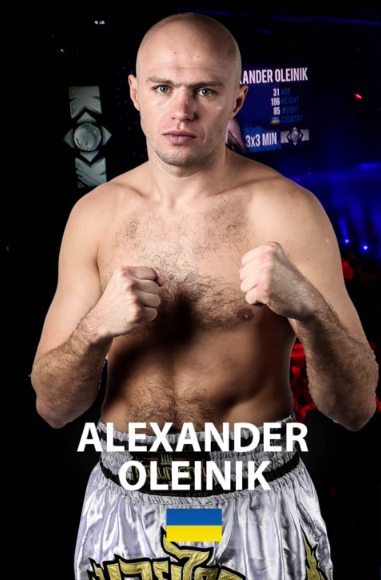
- Born: March 8, 1986 (age 40); Zhdanov, Ukrainian SSR, Soviet Union
- Native name: Александр Олейник
- Nationality: (Ukraine) Ukrainian
- Height: 1.86 m (6 ft 1 in)
- Weight: 86 kg (190 lb; 13.5 st)
- Division: Light Heavyweight; Cruiserweight; Middleweight
- Style: Muay Thai, kickboxing
- Stance: Orthodox

Kickboxing record
- Total: 51
- Wins: 44
- By knockout: 16
- Losses: 7

Other information
- Website: http://fbkveu.com.ua

Alexander Oleinik (Ukrainian: Олександр Олегович Олійник; born March 8, 1986) is a Ukrainian professional Kickboxing and Muay Thai fighter who competes in the middleweight, light heavyweight and cruiserweight divisions. He began practicing Kyokushin karate at the age of six. Soon he became a Ukrainian champion in the youth division. At the age of 17 he started practicing Muay Thai.

He first came to prominence due to his successful amateur career by winning IFMA European and World Championships in 2010. At that time he simultaneously combined his amateur and professional careers. He turned professional in 2007 by winning his debut fight in Brezno, Slovakia. Two years later he became ISKA World Champion in professional division. In 2010 Alexander won King of Kings World Grand Prix -83 kg in Chișinău, Moldova. He continued his professional record through 2011, winning the 2011 Tatneft World Cup in division under 80 kg.

As of January 2012, he is ranked the #2 light heavyweight kickboxer in the world by Liverkick.com. He has had wins over four top 10 fighters in Sem Braan, Constantin Țuțu, Alexander Stetsurenko and Dmitry Shakuta.

== Career ==
Alexander Oleinik
Medal record

Representing Ukraine

Muay Thai and Kickboxing

ISKA World Championship
Gold medal – first place	2017	Muay Thai
Gold medal – first place	2017	Kickboxing

IFMA World Championship
Bronze medal – third place	2012	Muay Thai
Bronze medal – third place	2011	Muay Thai
Gold medal – first place	2010	Muay Thai
Bronze medal – third place	2009	Muay Thai

IFMA European Championship
Silver medal – second place	2012	Muay Thai
Bronze medal – third place	2011	Muay Thai
Gold medal – first place	2010	Muay Thai

WAKO World Championship
Gold medal – first place	2009	Muay Thai
Gold medal – first place	2008	Muay Thai
Gold medal – first place	2008	Kickboxing

=== Professional record ===
Professional debut: July 7, 2007 (Brezno, Slovakia)

51 fights, 44 won, 16 KOs, 7 lost

- 2017 – ISKA Pro-Am World Champion – 88,5 kg – Singen, Germany
- 2017 – KOK World Grand Prix Winner – 85 kg – Tallinn, Estonia
- 2011 – Tatneft Cup Champion – -80 kg – Kazan, Russia
- 2010 – KOK World Grand Prix in K-1 Winner – 83 kg – Chisinau, Moldova
- 2009 – World champion in professional kickboxing K-1 – Hurghada, Egypt

=== Amateur career ===
The ninefold world champion on kickboxing and muay thai among amateurs under versions WAKO, IFMA and ISKA.

- World champion in K-1 and Low-kick (Kyiv, Ukraine, 2018 - ISKA) (gold)
- World champion in Muay-thai (Athens, Greece, 2017 – ISKA) (gold)
- World champion in K-1 (Athens, Greece, 2017 – ISKA) (gold)
- World champion in Muay-thai (Bangkok, Thailand, 2010 – IFMA) (gold)
- European Champion in Muay-thai (Rome, Italy, 2010 – IFMA) (gold)
- European Championship in Muay-thai (Antalya, Turkey, 2012 – IFMA) – 2nd place (silver)
- World Championship in Muay-thai (Bangkok, Thailand, 2009; Tashkent, Uzbekistan, 2011, Saint-Petersbourgh, Russia, 2012 – IFMA) – 3rd place (bronze)
- European Championship in Muay-thai (Antalya, Turkey, 2011 – IFMA) – 3rd place (bronze)
- World Cup winner in Muay-thai (Yalta, Ukraine, 2008 – WAKO) (gold)
- World Cup winner in Muay-thai (Yalta, Ukraine, 2009 – WAKO) (gold)
- World Cup winner in Kickboxing (Yalta, Ukraine, 2008 – WAKO) (gold)
- Champion of Ukraine in Muay-thai (14 gold medals, IFMA) (gold)
- Champion of Ukraine in Kickboxing (7 gold medals, WAKO, ISKA) (gold)

== Fight record ==
Professional kickboxing record
42 wins (16 (T)KOs), 6 losses, 0 draws
Date	Result	Opponent	Event	Location	Method	Round	Rules
2017-12-15	Loss	(China) Wei Zhou	King of Kung-fu World Championship	Qian'an, China	Judge decision	6	K-1
2017-12-12	Win	(Brazil) Vanderlei Goncalves Dos Santos	King of Kung-fu World Championship	Qian'an, China	Judge decision	3	K-1
2017-12-07	Win	(Thailand) Laononkro Anurak	King of Kung-fu World Championship	Qian'an, China	Judge decision	3	K-1
Conquers ISKA Pro-Am World Title and Belt (88,5 kg/195 lb)
2017-11-04	Win	(Germany) Selahattin Sahin	TBC Singen Fight Night	Singen, Germany	Judge decision	5	K-1
Wins the KOK 49 World Grand Prix Middleweight Tournament (-85 kg/-187 lb)
2017-10-14	Win	(Greece) Petros Vardakas	King of Kings 49 Final	Tallinn, Estonia	Judge decision	3	K-1
2017-10-14	Win	(Belarus) Pavel Turuk	King of Kings 49 Semifinal	Tallinn, Estonia	Judge decision	3	K-1
2017-04-28	Loss	(Czech Republic) Vasil Ducar	East Pro Fight 9	Košice, Slovakia	Judge decision	3	K-1
2016-05-13	Win	(Estonia) Maxim Vorovski	No.1 Fight Show	Tallinn, Estonia	Judge decision	3	K-1
2015-12-12	Win	(China) Li Hao Tian	Wang Zhe Gui Lai	Nantong, China	Knockout	2	K-1
2015-08-10	Win	(Ukraine) Vladislav Koshel	Golden Bars Championship	Belgorod, Russia	Judge decision	3	Muay Thai
2015-08-10	Win	(Belarus) Seku Bangura	Golden Bars Championship	Belgorod, Russia	Dissection	2	Muay Thai
2015-08-22	Win	(China) Liu Yuchun	Wu Lin Feng World Championship	Xiamen, China	Dissection	1	K-1
2015-06-27	Win	(Ukraine) Igor Lyapin	Plecho: Kick&Win	Kyiv, Ukraine	Judge decision	3	Low-Kick
2015-06-27	Win	(Ukraine) Nikolay Olyinyk	Plecho: Kick&Win	Kyiv, Ukraine	Judge decision	3	Low-Kick
2015-02-28	Win	(Ukraine) Nikita Zinchenko	Plecho: Kick&Win	Kyiv, Ukraine	Judge decision	3	Low-Kick
2015-02-28	Win	(Ukraine) Ivan Minenko	Plecho: Kick&Win	Kyiv, Ukraine	Judge decision	3	Low-Kick
2013-06-01	Win	(Slovakia) Miroslav Cingel	YoungBlood Profi Liga	Banska Bystrica, Slovakia	Judge decision	3	K-1
2013-05-18	Loss	(Russia) Artem Vakhitov	'Alpha' Cup	Moscow, Russia	Judge decision	5	Muay Thai
2012-09-29	Win	(Slovakia) Vladimir Idranyi	President's Cup	Mariupol, Ukraine	Judge decision	5	Muay Thai
2011-11-12	Win	(Belarus) Dmitry Shakuta	Tatneft Cup 2011 Final	Kazan, Russia	Judge decision	6	K-1
Wins the Tatneft World Cup and becomes World Champion at Light Heavyweight (-80 kg/-176 lb) category
2011-09-03	Win	(Poland) Stanislav Zanevsky	President's Cup	Mariupol, Ukraine	3 knockdowns	3	Muay Thai
2011-07-23	Win	(Russia) Alexander Stetsurenko	Tatneft Cup 2011 1/2 final	Kazan, Russia	Judge decision	4	K-1
2011-06-10	Win	(Poland) Dawid Kasperski		Poland	Judge decision	3	K-1
2011-05-28	Win	(Portugal) Jose Barradas	Tatneft Cup 2011 1/4 final	Kazan, Russia	Judge decision	3	K-1
2011-02-18	Win	(Netherlands) Errol Konning	Tatneft Cup 2011 1/8 final	Kazan, Russia	Judge decision	4	K-1
Wins the KOK World Grand Prix Championship (83 kg/183 lb)
2010-12-11	Win	(Moldova) Konstantin Tutu	King Of Kings Final	Chisinau, Moldova	Knockout	4	K-1
2010-12-11	Win	(Romania) Sebastian Horeica	King Of Kings 1/2 final	Chisinau, Moldova	Judge decision	3	K-1
2010-12-11	Win	(Netherlands) Sem Braan	King Of Kings 1/4 final	Chisinau, Moldova	3 knockdowns	2	K-1
2010-11-06	Win	(Poland) Igor Ditrich		Poland	Knockout	2	K-1
2010-11-06	Win	(Poland) Marcin Mencel		Poland	Knockout	1	K-1
2010-09-18	Win	(Ukraine) Alexandr Kitichenko		Zaporizhzhia, Ukraine	Judge decision	3	K-1
2010-04-16	Win	(Ukraine) Roman Mirzoev		Yenakiieve, Ukraine	Judge decision	3	K-1
2010-04-16	Win	(Ukraine) Igor Kabanov		Yenakiieve, Ukraine	Knockout	1	K-1
Wins the ISKA World Championship in the Light Heavyweight division
2008-07-18	Win	(Ukraine) Oleg Shevchenko		Sudak, Ukraine	Knockout	3	Wushu-Sanda
2008-07-18	Win	(Ukraine) Andrey Embalaev		Sudak, Ukraine	Judge decision	3	Wushu-Sanda
2008-07-18	Win	(Ukraine) Ivan Skifov		Sudak, Ukraine	Second's denial	2	Wushu-Sanda
2008-04-18	Win	(Turkey) Eyup Kuscu		Istanbul, Turkey	Knockout	2	K-1
2008-03-16	Win	(Ukraine) Vyacheslav Sherbakov		Mariupol, Ukraine	3 knockdowns	2	K-1
2008-02-26	Loss	(Ukraine) Sergey Lashenko	Honour Of Warrior	Kharkiv, Ukraine	Judge decision	4	Kick-Jitsu
2008-02-26	Win	(Ukraine) Andrey Anikin	Honour Of Warrior	Kharkiv, Ukraine	Judge decision	3	Kick-Jitsu
2008-02-26	Win	(Ukraine) Yuri Gorbenko	Honour Of Warrior	Kharkiv, Ukraine	Judge decision	3	Kick-Jitsu
2007-10-27	Win	(Ukraine) Yaroslav Zakharov		Mariupol, Ukraine	Judge decision	5	Muay Thai
2007-10-06	Loss	(Ukraine) Anrey Osadchiy		Morshyn, Ukraine	Judge decision	3	K-1
2007-08-10	Win	(Ukraine) Timur Bahramov		Feodosiya, Ukraine	Judge decision	3	K-1
2007-07-07	Win	(Slovakia) Slovak Fighter		Brezno, Slovakia	Judge decision	3	K-1
Legend: Win Loss Draw/no contest Notes

Amateur Muay Thai and kickboxing record
Date	Result	Opponent	Event	Location	Method	Round	Time
2012-09-11	Loss	(Belarus) Dzianis Hancharonak	2012 IFMA World Championships, Semi Final	Saint Petersburg, Russia	Decision	4	2:00
Wins 2012 IFMA World Championships 91kg Bronze Medal.
2012-09-09	Win	(Iran) Jafar Ahmadi	2012 IFMA World Championships, Quarter Finals	Saint Petersburg, Russia	Decision	4	2:00
2012-05-23	Loss	(Russia) Artem Vakhitov	2012 IFMA European Championships -86 kg/189 lb, Final	Antalya, Turkey	Decision	4	2:00
Wins 2012 IFMA European Championships -86kg Silver Medal.
2012-05-	Win	(Belarus) Andrey Gerasimchuk	2012 IFMA European Championships, Semi Final	Antalya, Turkey	Decision	4	2:00
2011-09-25	Loss	(Russia) Alexandr Veghvatov	2011 IFMA World Championships, Semi Finals	Tashkent, Uzbekistan	Decision	4	2:00
Wins 2011 I.F.M.A. World Muaythai Championships -86kg Bronze Medal.
2011-09-24	Win	(Kazakhstan) Nubolat Senginov	2011 IFMA World Championships, Quarter Finals	Tashkent, Uzbekistan	KO	2	
2011-04-00	Loss	(Russia) Artem Vakhitov	2011 IFMA European Championships -86 kg/189 lb, Semi Finals	Antalya, Turkey	Decision	4	2:00
Wins 2011 IFMA European Championships -86kg Bronze Medal.
2011-04-00	Win	(Bulgaria) Jordan Kolev	2011 IFMA European Championships -86 kg/189 lb, Quarter Finals	Antalya, Turkey	Decision	4	2:00
2010-12-	Win	(Belarus) Andrey Gerasimchuk	2010 I.F.M.A. World Muaythai Championships, Finals	Bangkok, Thailand	Decision	4	2:00
Wins 2010 IFMA World Championships -86kg Gold Medal.
2010-12-	Win	(Uzbekistan) Javlon Nazarov	2010 I.F.M.A. World Muaythai Championships, Semi Finals	Bangkok, Thailand	Decision	4	2:00
2010-12-	Win	(Sweden) Adam Lazarevic	2010 I.F.M.A. World Muaythai Championships, Quarter Finals	Bangkok, Thailand	Decision	4	2:00
2010-12-	Win	(Russia) Suleiman Magomedov	2010 I.F.M.A. World Muaythai Championships, 1/8 Finals	Bangkok, Thailand	Decision	4	2:00
2010-05-	Win	(Belarus) Andrey Gerasimchuk	2010 IFMA European Championships, Final	Italy	Decision	4	2:00
Wins 2010 IFMA European Championships -86kg Gold Medal.
2010-05-	Win	(Cyprus) Aristodimo Angelo	2010 IFMA European Championships, Semi Final	Italy	Decision	4	2:00
2010-05-	Win	(Slovenia) Thoday Toplak	2010 IFMA European Championships, Quarter Final	Italy	Doctor stoppage	1	
2009-12-	Loss	(Belarus) Andrey Gerasimchuk	2009 IFMA World Championships, Semi Finals	Bangkok, Thailand	Decision	4	
Wins 2009 IFMA World Championships -86kg Bronze Medal.
2009-05-30	Win	Egypt Fighter	ISKA World Championship	Hurghada, Egypt	KO	5	
2009-05-29	Win	(Democratic Republic of the Congo) Patrice Ndiaye	ISKA World Championship	Hurghada, Egypt	KO	3	
Legend: Win Loss Draw/no contest Notes

== Mixed martial arts record ==
Professional record breakdown
4 matches	2 wins	2 losses
By knockout	0	0
By submission	1	1
By decision	1	1

Res.	Record	Opponent	Method	Event	Date	Round	Time	Location	Notes
Loss	2–2	Artem Egorov	Decision		1 March 2009	2		Donetsk, Ukraine	
Win	2–1	Roman Mirzoev	Submission (choke)		1 March 2009	2		Donetsk, Ukraine	
Win	1–1	Denis Simkin	Decision		1 March 2009	2		Donetsk, Ukraine	
Loss	0–1	Buson Skodric	Submission (choke)		15 June 2008	1	1:06	Kosice, Slovakia	

== See also ==
- List of K-1 events
- List of K-1 champions
- List of male kickboxers
