= Valentin Slavikovski =

Belarusian kickboxer

- Born: December 9, 1990 (age 35); Minsk, Belarus
- Nationality: Belarus
- Height: 1.90 m (6 ft 3 in)
- Weight: 101 kg (223 lb; 15.9 st)
- Division: Heavyweight
- Style: Kickboxing, Muay Thai
- Last updated on: September 4, 2016

Valentin Slavikovski (Belarusian: Славiкоускi Валянцiн Валянцiнавiч; born December 9, 1990, in Minsk, Belarus) is a professional Belarusian kickboxer.

He is an International Master of Sports in Thai boxing and a member of the Belarusian Kickboxing, the Thai Boxing Federation, and the Belarusian Pankration Federation. Standing at 6 ft 3in (190 cm) and weighing 223 lbs (101 kg), Slavikovski has earned heavyweight titles and championship medals, including the Gold medal from the Baltic Games. He was also a winner in the Central Asian Games. In 2013, he received the President Award from President Sports Club for his achievements in international competitions.

== Early life ==
Valentin Slavikovski was born on December 9, 1990. While growing up in Minsk, Belarus, Slavikovski began showing an interest in boxing while in grade school. Continuing with his education, Slavikovski finished grade school and a firefighting training course.

After graduating, Slavikovski was accepted into the Belarusian National Technical University (BNTY). Balancing his studies and ambitions to be a boxer, Slavikovski earned a specialty in mining engineering and continued to train.

== Training ==
As he became more involved and dedicated to becoming a professional boxer, Slavikovski reached out to some boxing coaches. His first coach was Kapshay Gennady Pavlovich, the Head Coach of the Russian Mixed Martial Arts (MMA) team. Dmitry Shakuta, a professional Belarusian kickboxer, honored Master of Sports, all-round champion, and twelve-time kickboxing and Thai boxing world champion, also aided in coaching Slavikovski.

== Career highlights ==
Valentin Slavikovski is well known for his victories throughout the World Association of Kickboxing Organizations (WAKO). Thousands of men and women, from over twenty countries come together to compete for the organization each year. In 2010, Slavikovski took 2nd place at the XVI World Cup for Kickboxing. From 2011 to 2013, Slavikovski took 1st at each of the annual World Cup competitions, in the same sport.

Valentin Slavikovski's victory in the international tournament in Muay Thai and classic boxing at the Sports Palace in Minsk, Belarus, proved himself to be a promising fighter. The tournament brought crowds of professional fighters, fans and entertainment professionals and in particular to the fight between Slavikovski, and Ukrainian Thai boxing champion, Roman Cricklya.

On April 14, 2012, the fights for the qualifying round of the international tournament, Fight Code for TNA Muay Thai, took place at the Sports Palace in Minsk, Belarus. The event was broadcast in 49 countries around the world. The award-winning professional fighter Oleg Priymachev, of Ukraine, fought against Slavikovski. Slavikovski won against his opponent and gained media attention.

The international tournament of kickboxing also known as Night of Muay Thai (February 22, 2013), was hosted in the Soviet Wings Sport Palace in Moscow, Russia. Slavikovski fought against multiple world championship holder in Thai boxing, Dmitry Bezus, of Ukraine. The judges awarded the win to Slavikovski.

Slavikovski's fought during the Fights on TNA rules for TATNEFT Cup in 2014. Sportsmen from continents such as Europe, Asia, South America, and Africa were invited to the world championship, however, only titled sportsmen, such as Slavikovski, were allowed to participate. Slavikovski went up against Mohamed Boubkari. In the fight, Slavikovski ultimately won the match.

The semi-finals for the Fights on TNA were held in Kazan, Russia, where the second phase of the quarterfinal matches took place. Stefan Andjelkovic, who had already won several titles in kickboxing, was to fight against Slavikovski. By the end of the fourth round and by a unanimous decision, Slavikovski was announced as the winner.

In 2015 in Grozny, Chechen Republic, the Coliseum Arena hosted a large-scale professional kickboxing tournament called Absolute Championship Berkut-17(ACB-KB17). The capital of the Chechen Republic saw 14 fights in professional kickboxing, in which fighters from Russia, Serbia, Croatia, Netherlands, Morocco, South Korea, and the United States participated. During the tenth fight, Slavikovski defeated Kirill Kornilov of Russia and earned his place in the semi-finals.

The Grand Prix Absolute Championship Berkut was held in Anapa, Russia in September 2015. Slavikovski won again by defeating Stefan Andjelkovic a second time.

== Kickboxing record ==
Kickboxing record
Date	Result	Opponent	Event	Location	Method	Round	Time
2015-10-16	Loss	(Brazil) Jhonata Diniz	ACB KB-3 Sibiu Grand Prix Final	Sibiu, Romania	KO		
2015-09-27	Win	(Serbia) Stefan Andjelkovic	ACB KB-2 Grand Prix, 1/2 final	Anapa, Russia	Decision	3	3:00
2015-08-15	Loss	(Netherlands) Jahfarr Wilnis	Kunlun Fight 29	Sochi, Russia	Decision	3	3:00
2015-04-24	Win	(Russia) Kiril Kornilov	АСВ- КВ 1» Grand Prix, 1/4 final	Grozny, Chechen Republic	Decision	3	3:00
2014-07-18	Loss	(Belarus) Igor Bugaenko	TatNeft Arena, Fights on TNA rules for TATNEFT Cup 2014, 1/2 final	Kazan, Russia	Decision	4	3:00
2014-05-28	Win	(Serbia) Stefan Andjelkovic	TatNeft Arena, Fights on TNA rules for TATNEFT Cup 2014, 1/4 final	Kazan, Russia	Decision	4	3:00
2014-02-15	Win	(Morocco) Mohamed Boubkari	TatNeft Arena, Fights on TNA rules for TATNEFT Cup 2014, 1/8 final	Kazan, Russia	Decision	4	3:00
2013-02-22	Win	(Ukraine) Dmitry Bezus	Бойцовский международный турнир «Ночь тайского бокса»	Moscow, Russia	Decision	3	3:00
2011-12-03	Win	(Russia) Sharipov	Mixed martial arts tournament Crown of Moscow	Moscow, Russia	KO		3:00
2011-03-19	Win	(Russia) Dmitry Belyaev	K1 «VICTORY AND CLORY»	Lukow, Poland	Decision	3	3:00
Legend: Win Loss Draw/No contest Notes

== See also ==
- List of K-1 events
- List of male kickboxers
