= Steve Moxon =

Australian kickboxer

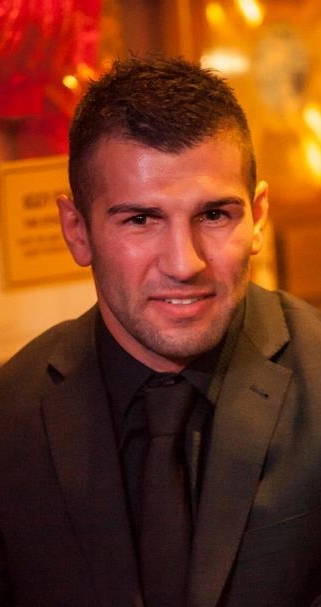
- Born: 9 November 1987 (age 38); Ballan, Victoria, Australia
- Other names: Stone Cold Steve Moxon
- Nationality: Australian
- Height: 1.69 m (5 ft 6 1/2 in)
- Weight: 70.0 kg (154.3 lb; 11.02 st)
- Division: Middleweight; Super Middleweight; GLORY Lightweight
- Reach: 67.5 in (171 cm)
- Style: Kickboxing
- Stance: Orthodox
- Years active: 2006–present

Professional boxing record
- Total: 8
- Wins: 5
- By knockout: 4
- Losses: 3
- Draws: 0

Kickboxing record
- Total: 65
- Wins: 48
- By knockout: 28
- Losses: 16
- Draws: 1

Other information
- Occupation: Business Owner
- Last updated on: 12 April 2014

Steve Moxon (born 9 November 1987) is an Australian former professional kickboxer and boxer, and the owner and head coach of Geelong Boxing Club in North Geelong, Australia. Competing primarily in the middleweight division, Moxon won the ISKA South Pacific Middleweight Championship, the WKF World Middleweight Championship in 2012, the A1 World Middleweight Championship in 2013, and the MASA World Middleweight Championship in 2017. He competed for major international promotions including GLORY, K-1, Kunlun Fight and Topking World Series, facing opponents including Buakaw Banchamek, Andy Souwer, Andy Ristie and Robin van Roosmalen. As of 2 November 2015, he was ranked the No. 11 lightweight in the world by GLORY.

Since retiring from competition, Moxon has worked as a boxing coach and gym owner in Geelong, Victoria, where he and his wife Lena Moxon operate Geelong Boxing Club and its associated youth development program, Beyond Boxing.

== Early life ==
Moxon hails from the small town of Ballan, Victoria. He is a joiner by trade and also served in the Australian Army.

== Career ==
=== Early career ===
Debuting as a professional fighter eight months after he first stepped in the gym, Moxon won his first fight by third-round technical knockout against Onur Yudical. Then continued his career with his first 16 fights remaining undefeated. He rose to prominence by winning the ISKA South Pacific Middleweight (−75 kg/165 lb) Championship early in his career, and moved to Sydney to train under Peter Graham at the Boxing Works gym. In 2010, he was a competitor on the Enfusion kickboxing reality TV show, in which he was eliminated by Pasi Luukanen.

On 10 July 2010, he made his K-1 debut against Kenmun at the K-1 World Grand Prix 2010 in Canberra, and took a split decision over the tall Japanese fighter. A month later, he drew with veteran Jordan Tai at Kings of Kombat 2010 in Keysborough, Australia. The pair rematched at Kings of Kombat 3 on 2 April 2011, with Moxon emerging the victor via majority decision this time.

Moxon competed in a four-man 72.5 kg/160 lb tournament held over two days in Haikou, Haidian Island, China. In the semi-finals on 18 December 2010, he defeated Luis Bio via unanimous decision before losing to Ky Hollenbeck by the same margin in the final on 19 December.

At this point in his career, his rise and style attracted the attention of his good friend and training partner Carlos Q, with whom Moxon joined forces in the sports and event management company MC2, a combat sports, entertainment, media and events management company, which is the organisation under which Steve manages his professional fight career and business interests.

Following this, he went on a run, taking wins over Harlee Avison, Bruce Macfie and Wes Capper to set him up for a fight with Frank Giorgi in Melbourne, Australia on 28 April 2012. With Giorgi being a Muay Thai stylist and Moxon a kickboxer, the match that many believed would crown Australia's top 70 kg/154 lb kickfighter took place under modified Muay Thai rules which excluded elbow strikes. Moxon floored Giorgi in the first round, but Giorgi then kept him at bay with kicks for the next four. Giorgi was given the nod via split decision.

=== Arrival on the world stage ===
He was able to rebound from this loss by becoming a world champion for the first time a month later when he took a split decision over the Frenchman Expedito Valin in Melbourne on 28 May 2012 to claim the WKF World Middleweight (−75 kg/165 lb) Championship. Moxon remained at 75 kg for his next fight, stopping Maseh Nuristani in the second round of their contest in Melbourne on 28 July 2012.

By this point in his career, Moxon had accumulated a record of 29–4–1 with 19 knockouts, which attracted top promotion Glory, with whom he signed in September 2012.

Around this time Moxon also made the move back from Sydney to his native state of Victoria (Australia), near the area where he grew up. As part of this move he joined Team Barbarian at Dave Ashmore's Barbarian Muay Thai Gym in Ballarat with Dave becoming his official trainer.

He was expected to fight Fadi Merza for the Austrian veteran's WKA World Middleweight (−72.5 kg/160 lb) title on 20 October 2012 in Melbourne but the bout was cancelled and Moxon instead went up against Giannis Mixalopoulos at Brute Force 21 on 18 November 2012, knocking the Greek down in round three before winning unanimous decision.

Moxon ended 2012 with a win over Mostafa Abdollahi at Kings of Kombat 8 on 8 December 2012 after Dzhabar Askerov withdrew from the fight. He dropped Abdollahi once in the first and then finished him in the second round, closing off a successful year with a 5–1 record.

Kicking off his 2013 campaign, Moxon fought Yohan Lidon for the A1 World Middleweight (−73 kg/160 lb) title in Melbourne on 22 February 2013, losing a close split decision.

Following this, he made his GLORY debut against Jordan Watson at Glory 5: London on 23 March 2013 and lost by unanimous decision.

Moxon defeated Dzhabar Askerov via split decision at Kings of Kombat 9 in Melbourne on 27 April 2013.

Moxon defeated Gökhan Türkyılmaz via 2nd Round KO in Istanbul, Turkey on 31 May 2013 to win the A1 World Middleweight (73 kg/160 lb) title.

He beat Yuri Bessmertny by unanimous decision at Kings of Kombat 10 in Melbourne, Australia on 7 September 2013.

He was set to face Gesias Cavalcante at Glory 11: Chicago – Heavyweight World Championship Tournament in Hoffman Estates, Illinois, US on 12 October 2013 but Cavalcante withdrew due to injury and was replaced by Reece McAllister. who Moxon beat via a third-round KO.

He lost to Andy Souwer by unanimous decision at Shoot Boxing Battle Summit Ground Zero Tokyo 2013 in Tokyo, Japan on 15 November 2013.

Moxon defeated Harley Love from New Zealand in a 4-round boxing match on his "Gold Rush" fight show in Ballarat, Australia on 14 Dec 2013 via a 1st Round TKO stoppage.

Moxon started off 2014 with a move from his previous home of Ballarat to Geelong, Victoria, Australia. This move also meant travelling 1 hour most weeks for training at Barbarian Muay Thai Gym in Ballarat, which Steve relished.

Moxon's first outing for 2014 since moving to Geelong was on Glory 15: Istanbul which Moxon lost to Niclas Larsen via second-round TKO at Glory 15: Istanbul in Istanbul, Turkey on 12 April 2014.

He quickly rebounded back a few weeks later on 26 April 2014 in a show reel fight against New Zealand top prospect Brad Riddell taking a unanimous points decision on Kings of Kombat 12 in Melbourne, Australia in a 5-round crowd pleaser and contender for fight of the year.

Subsequently, Moxon fought in his highly anticipated re-match with Dzhabar Askerov on Moment of Truth in Melbourne on 7 June 2014 but lost the rematch via a split points decision after a 5-round toe to toe war and contender for 'fight of the year' between the two fighters.

A month later on 6 July 2014 Steve lined up to take on the undefeated Australian and Celtic Middleweight Boxing Champion, Dennis Hogan, in a 12-round Championship fight for the WBA Oceania Jnr Middleweight Title. With undefeated records on the line for both fighters and heavily favoured odds for Hogan (29–0) with Moxon (5–0) being slated as an underdog, he had everything to fight for and proved most pundits wrong by going for a competitive fight over the 12 rounds and losing via a splits point decision having gone the distance. This was Moxon's first boxing fight scheduled and completed over a full 12 championship rounds.

Moxon won a unanimous points decision against Marco Tentori in the 5 round main event on the Kings of Kombat 13 show in Melbourne on 30 August 2014, he suffered a deep cut to the head from an accidental elbow towards the end of Round 4 but despite heavy bleeding put in a dominating performance in the 5th and final round much to the crowds delight. Post fight he required 6 stitches for the cut.

In early Sept, Moxon was invited to fight Muay Thai legend and K1 star Buakaw Banchamek as the main event in the Top King World Series in Paris, France, on 1 November 2014. Moxon welcomed the opportunity as part of his desire to challenge and fight the best in the world. The event was subsequently moved and held on 15 November 2014 with the Moxon – Buakaw main event scheduled as a full Muay Thai Rules fight.

Traditionally a K-1 style/rules fighter, this was Moxon's second time fighting under Muay Thai rules. Moxon lost through a referee stoppage (TKO) after a right elbow behind the ear which dropped him in the final Round (Round 3) of the fight. Buakaw's impressive Muay Thai skills and the specific effective use of knees and elbows caused Moxon a challenge through the fight with Moxon taking 3 earlier counts in the fight (in Round One and twice in Round 2) through Buakaw's effective striking. Despite the challenge Moxon showed tremendous heart and courage in this fight getting up to carry on fighting effectively despite the counts till the final referee stoppage.

Moxon kicked off 2015 with a huge win against leading fighter and GLORY number 4 ranked Aikpracha Meenayothin on 3 January in his debut on Kunlun Fight 15: The World MAX Return in Nanjing, China. After a tough scheduled 3 rounds, the fight was extended into the extra 4th round to determine a winner. After a gruelling round for Moxon, in another show of heart and determination he kept pushing through and connected flush with one of his trademark left hooks in the last 10 seconds of the round sending Aikpracha crashing to the canvas and sealing the Win at the end of the fight.

On 6 February 2015, Moxon fought the biggest name of his career to date, GLORY World #1 ranked Andy Ristie in a Superfight on Glory 19: USA in Hampton, Virginia, USA. He lost the fight via TKO in the first round.

Mid 2015 has seen Moxon on a top run lined up to fight across the world against some of the biggest names in the business. On 2 May 2015, Moxon took a great win in Zhengzhou, China against Hu Yafei at the Wu Lin Feng World Championship 2015.

Subsequently, he is lined up to fight two of the biggest names in kickboxing facing reigning GLORY Lightweight World Champion Robin van Roosmalen in New York on 3 June 2015 in a joint collaboration between Glory (kickboxing), Friday Night Fights and the Happy Hearts Fund for a major fundraising gala charity evening and then poised to take on Mike Zambidis on his home turf in Athens, Greece on 27 June 2015 in a fight two years in the making.

== Championships and awards ==
=== Kickboxing ===
- A1 World Combat Cup
  - A1 World Middleweight (−73 kg/160 lb) Championship
- International Sport Karate Association
  - ISKA South Pacific Middleweight (−75 kg/165 lb) Championship
- World Championship Kickboxing Muay Thai
  - WCK Muay Thai 72.5 kg/160 lb Tournament Runner-up
- World Kickboxing Federation
  - WKF World Middleweight (−75 kg/165 lb) Championship
  - MASA Middle-weight World Champion 2017

== Personal life ==
Moxon grew up in Ballan, Victoria. He is a joiner by trade and served in the Australian Army. He has lived in Geelong, Victoria since 2014.

Moxon is married to Lena Moxon, with whom he co-owns Geelong Boxing Club; the couple have one son.

== Coaching and Geelong Boxing Club ==
After relocating to Geelong in 2014, Moxon transitioned from competition into coaching and gym ownership. He initially operated The Training Room Geelong, a strength and conditioning, boxing and Muay Thai kickboxing gym in North Geelong, where he ran group training, sparring workshops and coaching seminars, including boxing skills workshops for personal trainers and group fitness coaches.

The business later became Geelong Boxing Club, a family-run boxing gym based in North Geelong that Moxon owns and operates with his wife, Lena Moxon. The club runs boxing, strength and conditioning, and personal training programs for children, teenagers and adults, with no competitive sparring required in its general programs.

=== Beyond Boxing ===
Through the club, the Moxons deliver Beyond Boxing, a non-contact, trauma-informed youth program that combines boxing training with mentoring and discussions on resilience and mental health. The program is built around the Positive Youth Development framework and the Resilience Doughnut model developed by clinical psychologist Lyn Worsley, and is delivered in schools, community centres and at the club. Sessions are led by Moxon, with program design and coordination by Lena Moxon, a child and adolescent mental health practitioner.

Moxon has also contributed to men's and youth mental health initiatives including Ask a Mate and Beyond DV.

== Boxing record ==
Boxing record
5 wins (4 KOs), 1 losses, 0 draws
Date	Result	Opponent	Event	Location	Method	Round	Time	Record
2014-07-06	Loss	(Australia) Dennis Hogan		Altona North, Australia	Decision (split)	12	3:00	5–1
For the WBA Oceania Jnr Middleweight Championship.
2013-12-14	Win	(New Zealand) Harley Love	Gold Rush	Ballarat, Australia	TKO	1	2:51	5–0
2012-08-24	Win	(Indonesia) Aswin Cabuy		Mansfield, Australia	TKO	5	0:41	4–0
2011-06-17	Win	(Australia) Kurt Bahram		Hurstville, Australia	TKO	1	2:15	3–0
2011-06-03	Win	(Australia) Rohan Murdock		Brisbane, Australia	Decision (majority)	4	3:00	2–0
2011-03-26	Win	(Australia) Steve Psaras Jr		Punchbowl, Australia	KO	3	0:24	1–0
Legend: Win Loss Draw/No contest Notes

== Kickboxing record ==
Kickboxing record
39 wins (23 KOs), 16 losses, 1 draw
Date	Result	Opponent	Event	Location	Method	Round	Time
2016-06-05	Loss	(Armenia) Marat Grigorian	The Legend of EMei	Chengdu, China	TKO (Referee Stoppage)	1	2:40
2015-10-31	Loss	(Ukraine) Enriko Gogokhia	Kunlun Fight 33 Final 16	Changde, China	Decision (Unanimous)	3	3:00
2015-06-27	Loss	(Greece) Mike Zambidis	Iron Challenge	Melbourne, Australia,	Decision	5	3:00
2015-06-03	Loss	(Netherlands) Robin van Roosmalen	The Happy Hearts Fund in collaboration with GLORY and Friday Night Fights 'FIGHT FOR EDUCATION'	New York, USA	Decision(Unanimous)	3	3:00
2015-05-02	Win	(China) Hu Yafei	Wu Lin Feng World Championship 2015	Zhengzhou, Henan, China	Decision	3	3:00
2015-02-06	Loss	(Suriname) Andy Ristie	Glory 19: Virginia	Hampton, Virginia, USA	TKO	1	2:43
2015-01-04	Win	(Thailand) Aikpracha Meenayothin	Kunlun Fight 15: The World MAX Return	Nanjing, China	Ext. R. Decision	4	3:00
2014-11-15	Loss	(Thailand) Buakaw Banchamek	Topking World Series 2	Paris, France	TKO (elbow)	3	0:25
2014-08-30	Win	(Italy) Marco Tentori	Kings of Kombat 13	Melbourne, Australia	Decision (unanimous)	5	3:00
2014-06-07	Loss	(Russia) Dzhabar Askerov	Moment of Truth	Keysborough, Australia	Decision (unanimous)	5	3:00
2014-04-26	Win	(New Zealand) Brad Riddell	Kings of Kombat 12	Dandenong, Australia	Decision (unanimous)	5	3:00
2014-04-12	Loss	(Denmark) Niclas Larsen	Glory 15: Istanbul	Istanbul, Turkey	TKO (punches)	2	1:33
2013-11-15	Loss	(Netherlands) Andy Souwer	Shoot Boxing Battle Summit Ground Zero Tokyo 2013	Tokyo, Japan	Decision (unanimous)	3	3:00
2013-10-12	Win	(England) Reece McAllister	Glory 11: Chicago	Hoffman Estates, Illinois, USA	KO (right hook)	3	0:28
2013-09-07	Win	(Belarus) Yuri Bessmertny	Kings of Kombat 10	Melbourne, Australia	Decision (unanimous)	3	3:00
2013-05-31	Win	(Turkey) Gökhan Türkyılmaz	A1 World Combat Cup	Istanbul, Turkey	KO	2	
Wins the A1 World Middleweight (−73kg/160lb) Championship.
2013-04-27	Win	(Russia) Dzhabar Askerov	Kings of Kombat 9	Melbourne, Australia	Decision (split)	3	3:00
2013-03-23	Loss	(England) Jordan Watson	Glory 5: London	London, England	Decision (unanimous)	3	3:00
2013-02-22	Loss	(France) Yohan Lidon	A1 World Combat Cup	Melbourne, Australia	Decision (split)	5	3:00
For the A1 World Middleweight (−73kg/160lb) Championship.
2012-12-08	Win	(Iran) Mostafa Abdollahi	Kings of Kombat 8	Melbourne, Australia	KO	2	
2012-11-18	Win	(Greece) Giannis Mixalopoulos	Brute Force 21	Melbourne, Australia	Decision (unanimous)	3	3:00
2012-07-28	Win	(Australia) Maseh Nuristani	Rise of Power	Melbourne, Australia	KO	2	
2012-05-19	Win	(France) Expedito Valin		Sydney, Australia	Decision (split)	5	3:00
Wins the WKF World Middleweight (−75kg/165lb) Championship.
2012-04-28	Loss	(Australia) Frank Giorgi	The Showdown	Melbourne, Australia	Decision (split)	3	5:00
2012-03-17	Win	(Australia) Wes Capper	Capital Punishment 5	Canberra, Australia	Decision (split)	3	3:00
2011-09-03	Win	(Australia) Bruce Macfie	Evolution 24	Brisbane, Australia	KO (left hook)	3	
2011-07-30	Win	(Australia) Harlee Avison	Capital Punishment 4	Canberra, Australia	KO (left hook to the body)	2	
2011-04-02	Win	(New Zealand) Jordan Tai	Kings of Kombat 3	Keysborough, Australia	Decision (majority)	3	3:00
2010-12-19	Loss	(United States) Ky Hollenbeck	WCK Muay Thai 72.5 kg/160 lb Tournament, Final	Haikou, China	Decision (unanimous)	3	3:00
For the WCK Muay Thai 72.5 kg/160lb Tournament Championship.
2010-12-18	Win	(Mexico) Luis Bio	WCK Muay Thai 72.5 kg/160 lb Tournament, Semi Finals	Haikou, China	Decision (unanimous)	3	3:00
2010-11-06	Loss	(Australia) Shannon King	Immortality 3: Undisputed	Australia	Decision (majority)	5	5:00
2010-08-29	Draw	(New Zealand) Jordan Tai	Kings of Kombat 2010	Keysborough, Australia	Decision draw	3	3:00
2010-07-10	Win	(Japan) Kenmun	K-1 World Grand Prix 2010 in Canberra	Canberra, Australia	Decision (split)	3	3:00
2010-00-00	Win	(Thailand) Mongkoldej Sitthepitak		Sydney, Australia	Decision	3	3:00
2010-01-00	Loss	(Finland) Pasi Luukkanen	Enfusion: Test of the Champions, First Round	Ko Samui, Thailand			
2009-11-20	Win	(Australia) Mike Dimitriou	War of the Worlds	Melbourne, Australia	KO (punches)	3	
2009-03-02	Win	(Australia) Tass Tsitsiras		Australia	TKO (referee stoppage)	7	
Legend: Win Loss Draw/No contest Notes
