= 2014 in Kunlun Fight =

Information
- First date: January 25
- Last date: December 4

Events
- Total events: 14

2014 was the first year in the history of Kunlun Fight, a kickboxing promotion based in China. 2015 started with Kunlun Fight 1 and ended with Kunlun Fight 14.

The events were broadcasts through a television agreement with Qinghai Television.

== Champions ==
Weight	Name	Event	Date	Notes
Kickboxing 70 kg	(Belarus) Dzianis Zuev def. Victor Nagbe (final) def. Aikpracha Meenayothin (semifinal)	Kunlun Fight 13	November 16, 2014	2014 70 kg Multi-part 16-man World Championship Tournament

== List of events ==
#	Date	Event	Venue	Location
14	December 4, 2014	Kunlun Fight 14	Royal Bangkok Sports Club	Bangkok, Thailand
13	November 16, 2014	Kunlun Fight 13	Hohhot People's Stadium	Hohhot, China
12	October 26, 2014	Kunlun Fight 12	Jianshui Olympic Sports Center	Jianshui, China
11	October 5, 2014	Kunlun Fight 11	Macau Forum	Macau, China
10	September 13, 2014	Kunlun Fight 10 / Topking World Series: TK1	Belarusian State Circus	Minsk, Belarus
9	August 31, 2014	Kunlun Fight 9	Shangqiu Stadium	Shangqiu, China
8	August 24, 2014	Kunlun Fight 8	Xining Badminton Center	Xining, China
7	July 27, 2014	Kunlun Fight 7	Zhoukou Sports Center	Zhoukou, China
6	June 29, 2014	Kunlun Fight 6	Chongqing Jiangnan Sports Hall	Chongqing, China
5	June 1, 2014	Kunlun Fight 5	Sichuan Emei Buddha Temple	Leshan, China
4	April 27, 2014	Kunlun Fight 4	Solaire Resort & Casino	Manila, Philippines
3	March 30, 2014	Kunlun Fight 3	Heilongjiang University Stadium	Harbin, China
2	February 16, 2014	Kunlun Fight 2 / Wu Lin Feng 2014 / MAX Muaythai 6	Henan Province Stadium	Zhengzhou, China
1	January 25, 2014	Kunlun Fight 1	Pattaya Beach Square	Pattaya, Thailand

== 70 kg World Max Tournament 2014 bracket ==
Final 16
(Estonia) Edvin Erik Kibus	3r.
(Australia) Victor Nagbe	KO
(Russia) Artem Pashporin	DEC
(China) Li Zikai	3r.
(Netherlands) Andy Souwer	3r.
(Morocco) Mustapha Haida	DEC
(Belarus) Dzianis Zuev	DEC
(China) Feng Xingli	3r.
(Ukraine) Roman Mailov	3r.
(Thailand) Aikpracha Meenayothin	DEC
(Iran) Seyedisa Alamdarnezam	3r.
(France) Dylan Salvador	DEC
(China) Jiao Fukai	DEC
(Democratic Republic of the Congo) Chris Ngimbi	3r.
(Japan) Tomoyuki Nishikawa	DEC
(China) Zheng Zhaoyu	3r.

Quarterfinals
(Australia) Victor Nagbe	DEC
(Russia) Artem Pashporin	3r.
(Morocco) Mustapha Haida	DEC
(Belarus) Dzianis Zuev	3r.
(Thailand) Aikpracha Meenayothin	DEC
(France) Dylan Salvador	3r.
(China) Jiao Fukai	DEC
(Japan) Tomoyuki Nishikawa	3r.

Semifinals
(Thailand) Aikpracha Meenayothin	2r.
(Belarus) Dzianis Zuev	KO
(Australia) Victor Nagbe	DEC
(China) Jiao Fukai	3r.

Final
(Belarus) Dzianis Zuev	DEC
(Australia) Victor Nagbe	3r.

== Kunlun Fight 1 ==
Kunlun Fight 1
- Promotion: Kunlun Fight
- Date: January 25, 2014
- Venue: Pattaya Beach Square
- City: Pattaya, Thailand

Event chronology
N/A	Kunlun Fight 1	Kunlun Fight 2 / Wu Lin Feng 2014 / MAX Muaythai 6

Kunlun Fight 1 was a kickboxing event held by Kunlun Fight on January 25, 2014 at the Pattaya Beach Square in Pattaya, Thailand.

=== Results ===
Fight Card
Weight Class				Method	Round	Notes
Wrestling 100+kg	(United States) Jeff Monson	vs.	(Kazakhstan) Isa Umanov	DRAW	3	
Sanda 67 kg	(China) Yan Xibo	def.	(Iran) Behzad Rafigh Doust	KO	1	
Muay Thai 62 kg	(China) Wei Ninghui	def.	(Thailand) Suthin Banchamek	TKO	2	
Kickboxing 80 kg	(Thailand) Vehas Topking	def.	(South Africa) Heinrich Potgieter	Decision (unanimous)	3	
MMA 60 kg	(New Zealand) Kai Kara-France	def.	(China) Wu Tieyin	Decision (unanimous)	3	
Muay Thai 80 kg	(China) Li Baoming	def.	(Colombia) Edgar Gustavo	Decision (unanimous)	3	
Muay Thai 67 kg	(Thailand) Petsangnuan Luktupfah	def.	(Belarus) Andrei Kulebin	Decision (unanimous)	3	Tournament Final
Muay Thai 63.5 kg	(Thailand) Lerdsila Chumpairtour	def.	(China) Deng Zeqi	Decision (unanimous)	3	
Kickboxing 63.5 kg	(Canada) Denis Puric	def.	(China) Kang En	Decision (unanimous)	3	
Wushu 56 kg	(China) Xiong Jingnan	def.	(Ukraine) Lena Ovchynnikova	Decision (unanimous)	3	
Muay Thai 67 kg	(Belarus) Andrei Kulebin	def.	(Uganda) Umar Semata	Decision (unanimous)	3	Tournament Semifinal
Muay Thai 67 kg	(Thailand) Petsangnuan Luktupfah	def.	(China) Guo Dongwang	Decision (unanimous)	3	Tournament Semifinal

=== 67 kg tournament bracket ===
Semifinals		Final
(China) Guo Dongwang	3r.
(Thailand) Petsangnuan Luktupfah	DEC	(Thailand) Petsangnuan Luktupfah	DEC
(Belarus) Andrei Kulebin	DEC	(Belarus) Andrei Kulebin	3r.
(Uganda) Umar Semata	3r.

== Kunlun Fight 2 / Wu Lin Feng 2014 / MAX Muaythai 6 ==
Kunlun Fight 2 / Wu Lin Feng 2014 / MAX Muaythai 6
- Promotion: Kunlun Fight / Wu Lin Feng / MAX Muaythai
- Date: February 16, 2014
- Venue: Henan Provincial Stadium
- City: Zhengzhou, China

Event chronology
Kunlun Fight 1	Kunlun Fight 2 / Wu Lin Feng 2014 / MAX Muaythai 6	Kunlun Fight 3

Kunlun Fight 2 / Wu Lin Feng 2014 / MAX Muaythai 6 was a kickboxing event held by Kunlun Fight on February 16, 2014 at the Henan Provincial Stadium in Zhengzhou, China.

=== Results ===
Fight Card
Weight Class				Method	Round	Notes
Kickboxing 63.5 kg	(Thailand) Lerdsila Chumpairtour	def.	(China) Wei Rui	Decision (unanimous)	3	
MMA 67 kg	(China) Huang Feier	def.	(Ukraine) Eugenia Kostina	Submission (Arm Bar)	1	
Kickboxing 80 kg	(Canada) Simon Marcus	def.	(Thailand) Vehas Topking	KO	1	Tournament Final
Kickboxing 59 kg	(China) Ou Yang	def.	(Thailand) Pele	Decision (unanimous)	3	
Muay Thai 63 kg	(Thailand) Naruto Banchamek	def.	(China) Bryan To Hang-Lam	Decision (unanimous)	3	
MMA 56 kg	(China) Jin Tang	def.	(Ukraine) Ekaterina Tamavskaya	Submission (rear naked choke)	1	
Kickboxing 80 kg	(Thailand) Vehas Topking	def.	(China) Nuerla Mulali	Decision (unanimous)	3	Tournament Semifinal
Kickboxing 80 kg	(Canada) Simon Marcus	def.	(New Zealand) Israel Adesanya	Decision (Extra-round - unanimous)	4	Tournament Semifinal
Muay Thai 72 kg	(Thailand) Moses Tor Sangtiennoi	def.	(China) Jiao Fukai	Decision (unanimous)	3	
Muay Thai 70 kg	(Thailand) Kem Sitsongpeenong	def.	(Australia) Toby Smith	Decision (unanimous)	3	

=== 80 kg tournament bracket ===
Semifinals		Final
(New Zealand) Israel Adesanya	4r.
(Canada) Simon Marcus	DEC	(Canada) Simon Marcus	DEC
(Thailand) Vehas Topking	DEC	(Thailand) Vehas Topking	3r.
(China) Nuerla Mulali	3r.

== Kunlun Fight 3 ==
Kunlun Fight 3
- Promotion: Kunlun Fight
- Date: March 30, 2014
- Venue: Heilongjiang University Stadium
- City: Harbin, China

Event chronology
Kunlun Fight 2 / Wu Lin Feng 2014 / MAX Muaythai 6	Kunlun Fight 3	Kunlun Fight 4

Kunlun Fight 3 was a kickboxing event held by Kunlun Fight on March 30, 2014 at the Heilongjiang University Stadium in Harbin, China.

=== Results ===
Fight Card
Weight Class				Method	Round	Notes
Kickboxing 72.5 kg	(China) Yi Long	def.	(South Korea) Choi Woo-yeong	Decision (unanimous)	3	
Kickboxing 58 kg	(China) Wang Kehan	def.	(Netherlands) Marloes Merza	Decision (unanimous)	3	
MMA 56 kg	(China) Jin Tang	def.	(South Korea) Yoo Jin Jung	TKO	2	
Kickboxing 52 kg	(Netherlands) Jemyma Betrian	def.	(China) E Meidie	Decision (unanimous)	3	Tournament Final
Kickboxing 80 kg	(China) Yan Xibo	def.	(South Korea) Lee Mingu	decision (unanimous)	3	
Kickboxing 52 kg	(Netherlands) Jemyma Betrian	def.	(Portugal) Katia Pedrosa	KO	2	Tournament Semifinal
Kickboxing 52 kg	(China) E Meidie	def.	(South Korea) Jiwaen Lee	decision (unanimous)	3	Tournament Semifinal
Kickboxing	(China) Wang Wanben	def.	(South Korea) Park Gihyun	TKO	1	
Kickboxing 65 kg	(South Korea) Dongsu Kim	def.	(China) Liu Xiangming	Decision (unanimous)	3	
Kickboxing 65 kg	(South Korea) Lee Sung-hyun	def.	(China) Meng Guodong	TKO	2	
MMA 61.5 kg	(China) Jiang Longyun	def.	(Japan) Kenichiro Hasunuma	TKO	1	

=== Female 52 kg tournament bracket ===
Semifinal		Final
(Portugal) Katia Pedrosa	2r.
(Netherlands) Jemyma Betrian	KO	(Netherlands) Jemyma Betrian	DEC
(China) E Meidie	DEC	(China) E Meidie	3r.
(South Korea) Jiwaen Lee	3r.

== Kunlun Fight 4 ==
Kunlun Fight 4
- Promotion: Kunlun Fight
- Date: April 27, 2014
- Venue: Solaire Resort & Casino
- City: Manila, Philippines

Event chronology
Kunlun Fight 3	Kunlun Fight 4	Kunlun Fight 3

Kunlun Fight 4 was a kickboxing event held by Kunlun Fight on April 27, 2014 at the Solaire Resort & Casino in Manila, Philippines.

=== Results ===
Fight Card
Weight Class				Method	Round	Notes
Kickboxing 95 kg	(France) Massinissa Hamaili	def.	(Slovenia) Ivan Bartek	TKO	2	Tournament Final
Hamaili replaced semifinal winner Sergio Pique who injured his ribs in the semifinal fight.
Kickboxing 61.5 kg	(Japan) Keijiro Miyakoshi	def.	(China) Wei Ninghui	Decision (Extra-round - Unanimous)	4	
Kickboxing 60 kg	(China) Wang Kehan	def.	(Brazil) Taina	TKO	3	
Kickboxing 70 kg	(Thailand) Changpuak Jetsada Pongtong	def.	(United States) Skylr Penna	Decision	3	
Kickboxing 60 kg	(China) Wang Wanben	def.	(Philippines) Reinhardt Badato	Draw	4	
MMA 56 kg	(China) Huang Feir	def.	(Philippines) Rochelle Lestino	Submission (Armbar)	1	
MMA 75 kg	(Canada) Matthew Richardson	def.	(China) Tang Yunxing	Decision (unanimous)	3	
Kickboxing 75 kg	(Philippines) Michael Badato	def.	(Thailand) Mokkharat Worawut	TKO	2	
Kickboxing 95 kg	(Netherlands) Sergio Pique	def.	(France) Massinissa Hamaili	decision (Majority)	3	Tournament Semifinal
Kickboxing 95 kg	(Slovenia) Ivan Bartek	def.	(China) Yin Pengsen	KO	2	Tournament Semifinal
Kickboxing 59 kg	(Philippines) Ryan Jakili	def.	(China) Ou Yang	KO	1	

=== 95kg tournament bracket ===
Semifinals		Final
(China) Yin Pengsen	2r.
(Slovenia) Ivan Bartek	KO	(France) Massinissa Hamaili	DEC
(Netherlands) Sergio Pique	DEC	(Slovenia) Ivan Bartek	3r.
(France) Massinissa Hamaili	3r.

== Kunlun Fight 5 ==
Kunlun Fight 5
- Promotion: Kunlun Fight
- Date: June 1, 2014
- Venue: Sichuan Emei Buddha Temple
- City: Leshan, China

Event chronology
Kunlun Fight 4	Kunlun Fight 5	Kunlun Fight 6

Kunlun Fight 5 was a kickboxing event held by the Kunlun Fight on June 1, 2014 at the Sichuan Emei Buddha Temple in Leshan, China.

=== Results ===
Fight Card
Weight Class				Method	Round	Notes
Boxing 100+kg	(China) Yunfei Li	def.	(New Zealand) Angie Davis	Decision	4	Female Bout
Kickboxing 66 kg	(China) Wang Yanlong	def.	(China) Wang Peng	2	KO	
Kickboxing 70 kg	(Australia) Victor Nagbe	def.	(China) Li Zikai	Decision (Unanimous)	3	Tournament Final
MMA 68 kg	(China) Yang Jianping	def.	(South Korea) In Haeng Cho	Submission (Rear-Naked Choke)	3	
MMA 56 kg	(Ukraine) Maryna Moroz	def.	(China) Huang Feier	Submission (Armbar)	1	
Kickboxing 70 kg	(Netherlands) Albert Kraus	def.	(China) Zheng Zhaoyu	KO	2	
Muay Thai 60 kg	(Thailand) Changpuak Jetsada Pongtong	def.	(China) Wang Wanben	TKO	3	
Kickboxing 67 kg	(China) Wu Xuesong	def.	(Belarus) Dzmitry Nason	Decision (Unanimous)	3	
MMA 56 kg	(China) Jin Tang	def.	(Russia) Yana Lyashko	Submission (Rear-Naked Choke)	1	
Kickboxing 70 kg	(Australia) Victor Nagbe	def.	(Morocco) Mohamed Medhar	Decision (Extra-round - Unanimous)	4	Tournament Semifinal
Kickboxing 70 kg	(China) Li Zikai	def.	(Russia) Artur Sushinskiy	Decision	3	Tournament Semifinal
Kickboxing 70 kg	(Iran) Mostafa Rajabi	def.	(Suriname) Hesdy Van Assen	Decision	3	
Kickboxing 60 kg	(China) Chen Changlin	def.	(Russia) Alexey Shatikin	Decision	3	

=== 70 kg tournament bracket ===
Semifinals		Final
(Morocco) Mohamed Medhar	4r.
(Australia) Victor Nagbe	DEC	(Australia) Victor Nagbe	DEC
(China) Li Zikai	DEC	(China) Li Zikai	3r.
(Russia) Artur Sushinskiy	3r.

== Kunlun Fight 6 ==
Kunlun Fight 6
- Promotion: Kunlun Fight
- Date: June 29, 2014
- Venue: Chongqing Jiangnan Sports Hall
- City: Chongqing, China

Event chronology
Kunlun Fight 5	Kunlun Fight 6	Kunlun Fight 7

Kunlun Fight 6 was a kickboxing event held by Kunlun Fight on June 29, 2014 at the Chongqing Jiangnan Sports Hall in Chongqing, China.

=== Results ===
Fight Card
Weight Class				Method	Round	Notes
MMA 68 kg	(United States) Emilio Urrutia	def.	(China) Alateng Burigede	Submission	1	
Kickboxing 100+kg	(Belarus) Andrey Gerasimchuk	def.	(Ukraine) Dmitri Bezus	Decision (Unanimous)	3	Tournament Final
Kickboxing 75 kg	(South Africa) Vuyisile Colossa	def.	(China) Xu Zhenguang	Decision (Unanimous)	3	
Kickboxing 80 kg	(Belarus) Dmitry Valent	def.	(Thailand) Vehas Topking	Decision	5	IPCC Title Fight
MMA 68 kg	(Russia) Akhal Aliev	def.	(China) Yan Xibo	Submission (Rear-Naked Choke)	2	
MMA 60 kg	(China) Wang Yan	def.	(Mongolia) Mydagmaa	Decision	3	Female Bout
MMA 61.5 kg	(Sweden) Ricky Granstad	def.	(China) Jiang Longyun	Decision	3	
MMA 70 kg	(United States) George Hickman	def.	(South Korea) Haotian Wu	Decision (Unanimous)	3	
Kickboxing 100+ kg	(Ukraine) Dmitri Bezus	def.	(Russia) Mikhail Tuterev	Decision (Unanimous))	3	Tournament Semifinal
Kickboxing 100+ kg	(Belarus) Andrey Gerasimchuk	def.	(Lithuania) Arnold Oborotov	KO	3	Tournament Semifinal
Kickboxing 65 kg	(Iran) Mahdi Mahmoudvand	def.	(China) Liu Xiangming	TKO	1	

=== 100kg tournament bracket ===
Semifinals		Final
(Lithuania) Arnold Oborotov	3r.
(Belarus) Andrei Gerasimchuk	KO	(Belarus) Andrei Gerasimchuk	DEC
(Ukraine) Dmitri Bezus	DEC	(Ukraine) Dmitri Bezus	3r.
(Russia) Mikhail Tuterev	3r.

== Kunlun Fight 7 ==
Kunlun Fight 7
- Promotion: Kunlun Fight
- Date: July 27, 2014
- Venue: Zhoukou Sports Center
- City: Zhoukou, China
- Attendance: Zhoukou Sports Center

Event chronology
Kunlun Fight 6	Kunlun Fight 7	Kunlun Fight 8

Kunlun Fight 7 was a kickboxing event held by Kunlun Fight on July 27, 2014 at the Zhoukou Sports Center in Zhoukou, China.

=== Results ===
Fight Card
Weight Class				Method	Round	Notes
MMA 65 kg	(China) Yao Honggang	def.	(Mongolia) Munkhbayer Jadambaa	Submission (Rear Naked Choke)	1	
Kickboxing 75 kg	(Thailand) Burneng	def.	(China) Han Kaihu	Decision	3	
Kickboxing 70 kg	(Japan) Tomoyuki Nishikawa	def.	(China) Zheng Zhaoyu	Decision	3	2014 70 kg World Championship Tournament Final 16
Kickboxing 70 kg	(Morocco) Mustapha Haida	def.	(Netherlands) Andy Souwer	Decision (Extra-round)	4	2014 70 kg World Championship Tournament Final 16
Kickboxing 70 kg	(Russia) Artem Pashporin	def.	(China) Li Zikai	Decision	3	2014 70 kg World Championship Tournament Final 16
Kickboxing 70 kg	(Thailand) Aikpracha Meenayothin	def.	(Ukraine) Roman Mailov	Decision	3	2014 70 kg World Championship Tournament Final 16
Kickboxing 70 kg	(China) Jiao Fukai	def.	(Democratic Republic of the Congo) Chris Ngimbi	Decision	3	2014 70 kg World Championship Tournament Final 16
Kickboxing 70 kg	(France) Dylan Salvador	def.	(Iran) Seyedisa Alamdarnezam	Decision	3	2014 70 kg World Championship Tournament Final 16
Kickboxing 70 kg	(Belarus) Dzianis Zuev	def.	(China) Feng Xingli	Decision	3	2014 70 kg World Championship Tournament Final 16
Kickboxing 70 kg	(Australia) Victor Nagbe	def.	(Estonia) Edvin Erik Kibus	Decision	3	2014 70 kg World Championship Tournament Final 16
Kickboxing 60 kg	(China) Li Ning	def.	(South Korea) Kim Jin-hyeok	Decision	3	2014 70 kg World Championship Tournament Final 16

== Kunlun Fight 8 ==
Kunlun Fight 8
- Promotion: Kunlun Fight
- Date: August 24, 2014
- Venue: Xining Badminton Center
- City: Xining, China

Event chronology
Kunlun Fight 7	Kunlun Fight 8	Kunlun Fight 9

Kunlun Fight 8 was a kickboxing event held by Kunlun Fight on August 24, 2014 at the Xining Badminton Center in Xining, China.

=== Results ===
Fight Card
Weight Class				Method	Round	Notes
Kickboxing 75 kg	(China) Xu Yongba	def.	(Belarus) Kiryl Chanka	Decision	3	Tournament Final
Kickboxing 80 kg	(China) Bai Jinbin	def.	(China) Nuerla Mulali	KO	3	
MMA 56 kg	(Ukraine) Maryna Moroz	def.	(China) Jin Tang	Submission (Armbar)	1	
Kickboxing 90 kg	(China) Wang Chongfeng	def.	(France) Aristote Quitusisa	Decision	3	
Kickboxing 56 kg	(South Korea) Jiwaen Lee	def.	(China) Ren Kailin	Decision (Unanimous)	3	Female Bout
Kickboxing 70 kg	(Belarus) Vladimir Konsky	def.	(Thailand) Kem Sitsongpeenong	Decision (Unanimous)	5	
Kickboxing 60 kg	(China) Mao Ning	def.	(Portugal) Maria Lobo	Decision (Extra-round)	4	
Kickboxing 75 kg	(Azerbaijan) Parviz Abdullayev	def.	(China) Zheng Zhaoyu	Decision	3	
Kickboxing 75 kg	(Belarus) Kiryl Chanka	def.	(New Zealand) Daniel James Keer	Decision	3	Tournament Semifinal
Kickboxing 75 kg	(China) Xu Yongba	def.	(Slovenia) Saso Popovic	Decision	3	Tournament Semifinal

=== 75kg tournament bracket ===
Semifinals		Final
(Slovenia) Saso Popovic	3r.
(China) Xu Yongba	DEC	(China) Xu Yongba	DEC
(Belarus) Kiryl Chanka	DEC	(Belarus) Kiryl Chanka	3r.
(New Zealand) Daniel James Keer	3r.

== Kunlun Fight 9 ==
Kunlun Fight 9
- Promotion: Kunlun Fight
- Date: August 31, 2014
- Venue: Shangqiu Stadium
- City: Shangqiu, China

Event chronology
Kunlun Fight 8	Kunlun Fight 9	Kunlun Fight 10 / Topking World Series: TK1

Kunlun Fight 9 was a kickboxing event held by Kunlun Fight on August 31, 2014 at the Shangqiu Stadium in Shangqiu, China.

=== Results ===
Fight Card
Weight Class				Method	Round	Notes
Kickboxing 75 kg	(China) Zhang Kaiyin	def.	(Thailand) Lamsongkram Chuwattana	Decision (Unanimous)	3	
Kickboxing 60 kg	(Kyrgyzstan) Valentina Shevchenko	def.	(Russia) Irina Mazepa	KO	1	Tournament Final
MMA 65 kg	(China) Honggang Yao	def.	(Japan) Daisaku Tanaka	Submission (Armbar)	2	
MMA 67 kg	(South Korea) Kim Yi-Sak	def.	(China) Yan Xibo	Submission (Armbar)	1	
Kickboxing 60 kg	(Kyrgyzstan) Valentina Shevchenko	def.	(China) Wang Yang	Decision (Unanimous)	3	Tournament Semifinal
Kickboxing 60 kg	(Russia) Irina Mazepa	def.	(Germany) Michaela Michl	Decision (Unanimous)	3	Tournament Semifinal
MMA 56 kg	(China) Xiong Jingnan	def.	(Ukraine) Inna Hutsal	Submission	1	
Kickboxing 60 kg	(China) Li Ning	def.	(Iran) Alireza Ghadiri	Decision (Unanimous)	3	
Kickboxing 63 kg	(China) Jin Ying	def.	(China) Li Xiaomao	Decision (Unanimous)	3	
Kickboxing 60 kg	(Kyrgyzstan) Valentina Shevchenko	def.	(Italy) Elisa Qualizza	Decision (Unanimous)	3	Tournament Quarterfinal
Kickboxing 60 kg	(China) Yang Yang	def.	(Canada) Frances Watthanaya	TKO	1	Tournament Quarterfinal
Kickboxing 60 kg	(Germany) Michaela Michl	def.	(Belarus) Alena Muratova	Decision	3	Tournament Quarterfinal
Kickboxing 60 kg	(Russia) Irina Mazepa	def.	(China) Xuer	KO	3	Tournament Quarterfinal

=== Female 60kg tournament bracket ===
Quarterfinals
(Italy) Elisa Qualizza	3r.
(Kyrgyzstan) Valentina Shevchenko	DEC
(China) Wang Yang	KO
(Canada) Frances Watthanaya	3r.
(Belarus) Alena Muratova	3r.
(Germany) Michaela Michl	DEC
(Russia) Irina Mazepa	DEC
(China) Yuan Xuetao	3r.

Semifinals
(Kyrgyzstan) Valentina Shevchenko	DEC
(China) Wang Yang	3r.
(Russia) Irina Mazepa	DEC
(Germany) Michaela Michl	3r.

Final
(Kyrgyzstan) Valentina Shevchenko	KO
(Russia) Irina Mazepa	1r.

== Kunlun Fight 10 / Topking World Series: TK1 ==
Kunlun Fight 10
- Promotion: Kunlun Fight / Topking
- Date: September 13, 2014
- Venue: Belarusian State Circus
- City: Minsk, Belarus

Event chronology
Kunlun Fight 9	Kunlun Fight 10	Kunlun Fight 11

Kunlun Fight 10 / Topking World Series: TK1 was a kickboxing event held by Kunlun Fight on September 13, 2014 at the Belarusian State Circus in Minsk, Belarus .

=== Results ===
Fight Card
Weight Class				Method	Round	Notes
Kickboxing 95 kg	(Belarus) Andrey Gerasimchuk	def.	(China) Wang Chongyang	TKO	3	Tournament Final
Muay Thai 58 kg	(China) Wang Kehan	def.	(Belarus) Masha Valent	Tornado	3	For the IPCC Muay Thai Title
MMA 60 kg	(Belarus) Vadim Zhlobich	def.	(China) Wu Tieyin	Submission (Arm Bar)	2	
Muay Thai 57 kg	(China) Ji Jianguang	def.	(Belarus) Andrei Zayats	Decision (Unanimous)	3	For the IPCC Muay Thai Title
MMA 70 kg	(China) Haotian Wu	def.	(Belarus) Apti Bimarzaev	Submission (Read Naked Choke)	2	
Kickboxing 64 kg	(Belarus) Yuri Zhkovski	def.	(China) Meng Guodong	KO	3	
Kickboxing 53 kg	(Belarus) Sergei Skiba	def.	(Hong Kong) Pak-Yu Leung	Decision	3	
Kickboxing 95 kg	(Belarus) Andrei Gerasimchuk	def.	(France) Abdarhmane Coulibaly	Decision	3	Tournament Semifinal
Kickboxing 95 kg	(China) Wang Chongyang	def.	(Iran) Meisam	KO	1	Tournament Semifinal

=== 95kg tournament bracket ===
Semifinals		Final
(France) Abdarhmane Coulibaly	3r.
(Belarus) Andrei Gerasimchuk	DEC	(Belarus) Andrei Gerasimchuk	TKO
(China) Wang Chongyang	KO	(China) Wang Chongyang	3r.
(Iran) Meisam	3r.

== Kunlun Fight 11 ==
Kunlun Fight 11
- Promotion: Kunlun Fight
- Date: October 5, 2014
- Venue: Macau Forum
- City: Macao, China

Event chronology
Kunlun Fight 10 / Topking World Series: TK1	Kunlun Fight 11	Kunlun Fight 12

Kunlun Fight 11 was a kickboxing event held by Kunlun Fight on October 5, 2014 at the Macau Forum in Macao, China.

=== Results ===
Fight Card
Weight Class				Method	Round	Notes
MMA 68 kg	(China) Yang Jianpiang	def.	(South Korea) Yi-sak Kim	Decision	3	
Kickboxing 60 kg	(Kyrgyzstan) Valentina Shevchenko	def.	(France) Chali Bassinah	Decision	3	For the Kunlun Fight Women's Lightweight Championship
Kickboxing 70 kg	(China) Jiao Fukai	def.	(Japan) Tomoyuki Nishikawa	Decision	3	2014 70 kg World Championship Tournament Quarterfinal
MMA 66 kg	(Greece) Tony Christodoulou	def.	(United States) Eric Uresk	Decision	3	
Kickboxing 70 kg	(Thailand) Aikpracha Meenayothin	def.	(France) Dylan Salvador	Decision	3	2014 70 kg World Championship Tournament Quarterfinal
Kickboxing 60 kg	(Japan) Satoshi Nakamura	def.	(Republic of Ireland) Andrew Doyle	Decision	3	
Kickboxing 52 kg	(China) E Meidie	def.	(Romania) Corina Carlescu	Decision	3	
Kickboxing 70 kg	(Morocco) Mustapha Haida	def.	(Belarus) Dzianis Zuev	Decision	3	2014 70 kg World Championship Tournament Quarterfinal
Kickboxing 65 kg	(China) Yang Zhuo	def.	(South Korea) Kim Dongsu	Decision (Extra-round)	4	
Kickboxing 70 kg	(Australia) Victor Nagbe	def.	(Russia) Artem Pashporin	Decision	3	2014 70 kg World Championship Tournament Quarterfinal
Kickboxing 63 kg	(Thailand) Santi Phromsopha	def.	(China) Ning Li	Decision	3	

== Kunlun Fight 12 ==
Kunlun Fight 12
- Promotion: Kunlun Fight
- Date: October 26, 2014
- Venue: Jianshui Olympic Sports Center
- City: Jianshui, China

Event chronology
Kunlun Fight 11	Kunlun Fight 12	Kunlun Fight 13

Kunlun Fight 12 was a kickboxing event held by Kunlun Fight on October 26, 2014 at the Jianshui Olympic Sports Center in Jianshui, China.

=== Results ===
Fight Card
Weight Class				Method	Round	Notes
Kickboxing 65 kg	(China) Yang Zhuo	def.	(Thailand) JR	TKO	2	Tournament Final
Kickboxing 75 kg	(China) Jiang Chunpeng	def.	(Canada) Allan Aldatov	Decision	3	
Muay Thai 75 kg	(Canada) Simon Marcus	def.	(Belarus) Dmitry Valent	Decision	3	IPCC Title Fight
MMA 60 kg	(China) Wuliji Buren	def.	(Libya) Ali Elezzabi	Decision	3	
Kickboxing 70 kg	(Japan) Miyakoshi Soichiro	def.	(China) Li Zikai	Decision	3	
Kickboxing 60 kg	(China) Yang Yang	def.	(Canada) Angelina Musicco	KO	1	
MMA 62 kg	(China) Cui Liucai	def.	(Iran) Hazhir Rahmani	Submission	1	
Kickboxing 65 kg	(China) Zhang Chunyu	def.	(Canada) Ruel Copeland	Decision	3	
Kickboxing 65 kg	(Thailand) JR	def.	(Iran) Mahdi Mahmoudvand	Decision	3	Tournament Semifinal
Kickboxing 65 kg	(China) Yang Zhuo	def.	(Canada) Matt Embree	Decision	3	Tournament Semifinal

=== 65kg tournament bracket ===
Semifinals		Final
(Iran) Mahdi Mahmoudvand	3r.
(Thailand) JR	DEC	(China) Yang Zhuo	TKO
(China) Yang Zhuo	KO	(Thailand) JR	2r.
(Canada) Matt Embree	3r.

== Kunlun Fight 13 ==
Kunlun Fight 13
- Promotion: Kunlun Fight
- Date: November 16, 2014
- Venue: Hohhot People's Stadium
- City: Hohhot, China

Event chronology
Kunlun Fight 12	Kunlun Fight 13	Kunlun Fight 14

Kunlun Fight 13 was a kickboxing event held by Kunlun Fight on November 16, 2014 at the Hohhot People's Stadium in Hohhot, China.

=== Results ===
Fight Card
Weight Class				Method	Round	Notes
Kickboxing 70 kg	(Belarus) Dzianis Zuev	def.	(Australia) Victor Nagbe	Decision	3	2014 70 kg World Championship Tournament Final
Kickboxing 60 kg	(China) Li Ning	def.	(Thailand) Lerdsila Chumpairtour	Decision	3	60 kg World Championship Title Fight
Kickboxing 75 kg	(China) Bai Jinbin	def.	(South Korea) Kim Dea-hyeon	KO	3	
Kickboxing 70 kg	(Netherlands) Albert Kraus	def.	(China) Li Yankun	Decision	3	
MMA 60 kg	(Canada) Denis Puric	def.	(China) Alateng Heili	TKO	2	
MMA 68 kg	(Kazakhstan) Askar Umbetov	def.	(China) Yan Xibo	Submission (Armbar)	1	
MMA 100+ kg	(China) Lahan Wu	def.	(Iran) Akbar Karimi	Submission	1	
Kickboxing 80 kg	(Russia) Alexander Stetsurenko	def.	(China) Nuerla Mulali	Decision	3	
MMA 65 kg	(Brazil) Bruno Amorin	def.	(China) Alateng Burigede	TKO	3	
Kickboxing 70 kg	(China) Zheng Zhaoyu	def.	(Russia) Artem Pashporin	TKO	3	2014 70 kg World Championship Tournament Reserve Fight
Kickboxing 70 kg	(Belarus) Dzianis Zuev	def.	(Thailand) Aikpracha Meenayothin	KO	2	2014 70 kg World Championship Tournament Semifinal
Mustapha Haida had to drop out due to injury and was replaced by Dzianis Zuev.
Kickboxing 70 kg	(Australia) Victor Nagbe	def.	(China) Jiao Fukai	Decision	3	2014 70 kg World Championship Tournament Semifinal

== Kunlun Fight 14 ==
Kunlun Fight 14
- Promotion: Kunlun Fight
- Date: December 4, 2014
- Venue: Royal Bangkok Sports Club
- City: Bangkok, Thailand

Event chronology
Kunlun Fight 13	Kunlun Fight 14	Kunlun Fight 15

Kunlun Fight 14 was a kickboxing event held by Kunlun Fight on December 4, 2014 at the Royal Bangkok Sports Club in Bangkok, Thailand.

=== Results ===
Fight Card
Weight Class				Method	Round	Notes
Kickboxing 67 kg	(Thailand) Boon	def.	(South Korea) Zhong Congyang	Decision	3	
Kickboxing 67 kg	(China) Yang Zhuo	def.	(South Korea) Beack Manseng	KO	3	
Muay Thai 67 kg	(France) Alexis Barateau	def.	(Singapore) One Seng Soon	Decision	3	
Kickboxing 60 kg	(China) Wang Kehan	def.	(Italy) Emily Wahby	Decision	3	
Kickboxing 67 kg	(China) Zhang Chunyu	def.	(Italy) Mauro Serra	Decision	3	
Kickboxing 56 kg	(China) Xu Zhurong	def.	(Ukraine) Vitalia Topal	Decision	3	Female Bout
Kickboxing 100+kg	(Belarus) Andrey Gerasimchuk	def.	(Netherlands) Sergio Pique	Decision	3	
Kickboxing 60 kg	(South Korea) Kim Jin-Hyeok	def.	(China) Jin Ying	Decision	3	
Kickboxing 54 kg	(Thailand) Peachbenja Krungtepthonburi	def.	(China) Ren Kailin	Decision	3	Female Bout
Kickboxing 75 kg	(Russia) Yurik Davtyan	def.	(China) Han Kaihu	Decision	3	
Kickboxing 52 kg	(China) E Meidie	def.	(Russia) Lyazzat Akylova	TKO	2	Female Bout
Kickboxing 75 kg	(China) Deng Guowei	def.	(Ukraine) Edward Korol	Decision	3	

== See also ==
- List of Kunlun Fight events
- 2014 in Glory
