= Aikpracha Meenayothin =

Thai Muay Thai kickboxer

Eakpracha Meenayothin
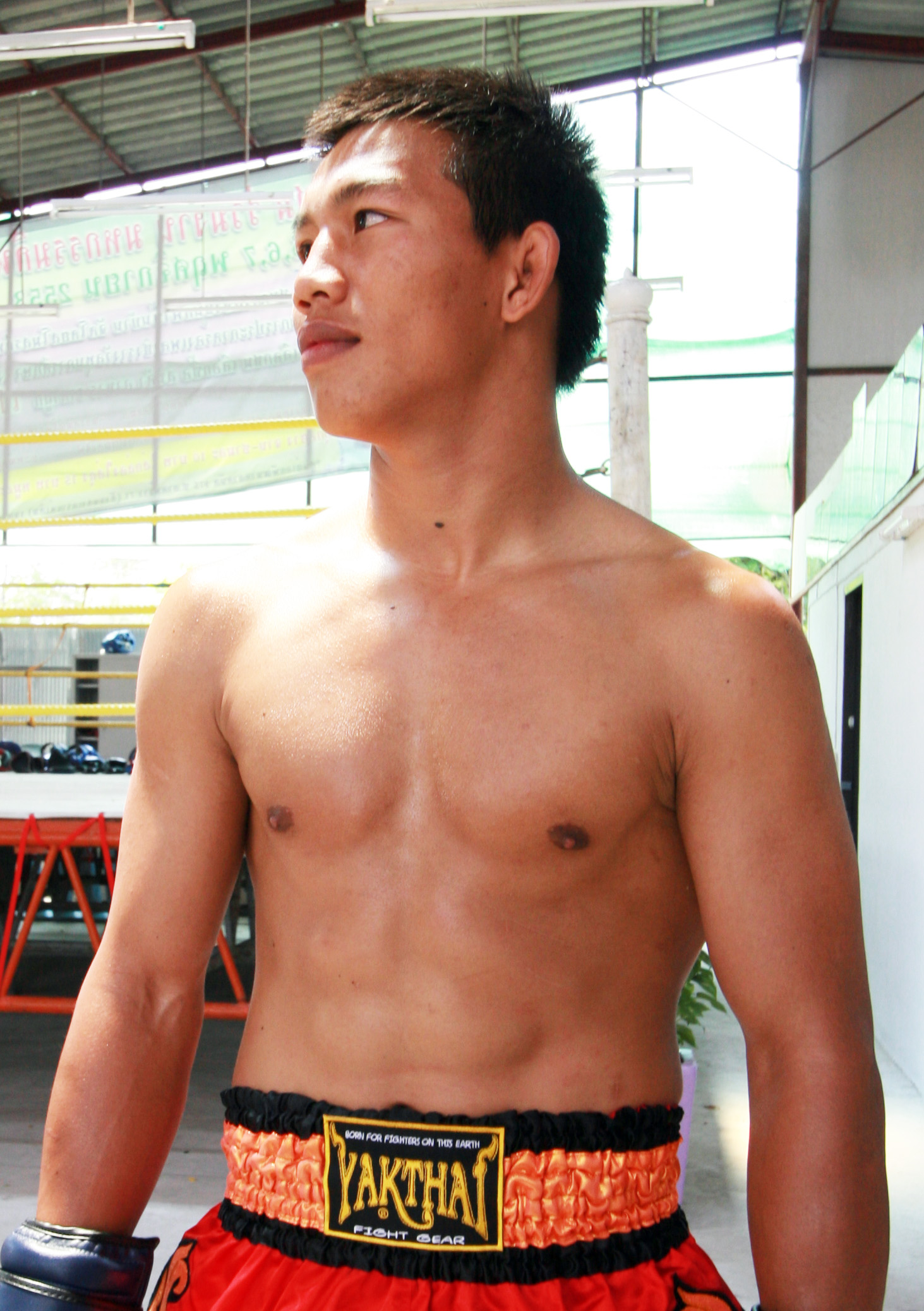
- Born: Pracha Somchan; 24 March 1985 (age 41); Thailand
- Native name: เอกประชา มีนะโยธิน
- Other names: Eikpracha, The Hitman
- Nationality: Thai
- Height: 1.73 m (5 ft 8 in)
- Weight: 70.0 kg (154.3 lb; 11.02 st)
- Division: Welterweight
- Style: Muay Thai
- Stance: Southpaw
- Fighting out of: Sisaket Province, Thailand
- Team: Meenayothin Gym
- Trainer: Heang Chaiyasit Kongkiatkong

Kickboxing record
- Total: 118
- Wins: 95
- By knockout: 65
- Losses: 22
- Draws: 1
- Last updated on: March 8, 2014

Eakpracha Meenayothin (Thai: เอกประชา มีนะโยธิน) is a Thai Muay Thai kickboxer. He is a former WMC and Lumpinee Stadium champion. He is also two times Toyota Vigo Marathon Tournament Champion.

== Biography and career ==
Aikpracha beat the Iranian Vahid Rossani, French champion Antuan Siangboxing, a technician who lives in Thailand, and the Swedish Tobias Alexander, whom he beat by KO in the 1st round.

He faced Yohan Lidon at Thai Fight: Lyon on September 19, 2012 in Lyon, France, and won via decision after three rounds.

He beat Jordan Watson on points in Bangkok on December 15, 2012.

He TKO'd Frank Giorgi in the second round at Yokkao Extreme 2013 in Milan, Italy on January 26, 2013.

Just a week later, Aikpracha fought in a 72.5 kg tournament at La Nuit des Titans in Tours, France on February 2, 2013. He faced Yury Bessmertny in the semi-finals and won rounds one and three but was floored in the second and so the match went to an extension round to decide the victor. Aikpracha won this round with ease and so marched into the final against Karim Ghajji. Despite being the favourite to win the tournament he was brutally knocked out by Ghajji in the first round with a high kick, straight left, knee and right hand combination.

On May 6, 2013, Aikpracha fought to a draw with Enriko Kehl at MAX Muay Thai 1 in Surin, Thailand.

He soundly beat Warren Stevelmans to a decision win at MAX Muay Thai 2 in Pattaya, Thailand on June 29, 2013.

He was set to rematch Jordan Watson at MAX Muay Thai 3 in Zhengzhou, China on August 10, 2013. However, he was replaced by Sitthichai Sitsongpeenong for undisclosed reasons.

He beat Tamoaki Makino by decision at MAX Muay Thai 4 in Sendai, Japan on October 6, 2013.

He beat Tomoyuki Nishikawa by TKO due to a cut in round one at MAX Muay Thai 5: The Final Chapter in Khon Kaen, Thailand on December 10, 2013.

He signed with Glory in late January 2014 and won by split decision in his promotional debut against Albert Kraus at Glory 14: Zagreb in Zagreb, Croatia on March 8, 2014.

Aikpracha faced Youssef Boughanem at MAX Muay Thai 7 in Bangkok, Thailand on March 29, 2014.

== Titles and achievements ==
- Final Legend
  - 2015 Final Legend 4-man (-70 kg) Tournament Champion
- Lumpinee Stadium
  - 2012 Lumpinee Stadium Welterweight Champion (147 lbs)
- Toyota Marathon
  - 2011 Toyota Vigo Marathon Tournament Champion (154 lbs)
  - 2010 Toyota Vigo Marathon Tournament Champion (154 lbs)
- World Muaythai Council
  - 2010 WMC Welterweight World (147 lbs) Champion
  - 2012 WMC Prince's Cup (-72 kg) Champion
- Professional Boxing Association of Thailand (PAT)
- 2010 Thailand (147 lbs) Champion
- OneSongchai
  - S-1 Tournament Champion (115 lbs)

Awards

- Muaythaitv.com
  - 2012 International Fighter of the Year

== Fight record ==
Muaythai record
95 Wins, 22 Losses, 1 Draw
Date	Result	Opponent	Event	Location	Method	Round	Time
2017-12-17	Loss	(China) Nurla Mulali	Kunlun Fight 68	Sanya, China	Decision	3	3:00
2016-06-25	Loss	(Iran) Masoud Minaei	FF Fight	Shanghai, China	KO (High Kick)	1	2:10
2016-05-28	Win	Adam	Extreme Fighting Warrior Hero World Series	Nanchang, China	KO	1	
2016-01-23	Loss	(Russia) Dzhabar Askerov	Kunlun Fight 37	Sanya, China	KO (right hook)	2	2:12
2015-12-28	Win	(Sweden) Sanny Dahlbeck	Topking World Series 8	Pattaya, Thailand	TKO	2	
2015-09-04	Win	(Belarus) Pavel Dzialendzik	Topking World Series 5 & Kunlun Fight 30	Zhoukou, China	KO(Left Elbow)	1	2:01
2015-06-11	Win	(Belarus) Andrei Kulebin	Final Legend, Final	Macao, China	Decision	3	3:00
Won the Final Legend 4-Man tournament.
2015-06-11	Win	(France) Gaetam Dambo	Final Legend, Semi Finals	Macao, China	Decision	3	3:00
2015-02-01	Loss	(Armenia) Marat Grigorian	Kunlun Fight 18: The Return of the King - Tournament, Semi Finals	Guangzhou, China	KO (Right hook)	2	
2015-01-04	Loss	(Australia) Steve Moxon	Kunlun Fight 18: The World MAX Return	Nanjing, China	Ext. R. Decision	4	3:00
2014-11-16	Loss	(Belarus) Dzianis Zuev	Kunlun Fight 13 - World MAX 2014, Semi Finals	Hohhot, China	KO (punch)	3	
2014-10-05	Win	(France) Dylan Salvador	Kunlun Fight 11 - World MAX 2014 Final 8	Macao, China	Decision	3	3:00
2014-07-27	Win	(Ukraine) Roman Mailov	Kunlun Fight 7 - World MAX 2014 Final 16	Zhoukou, China	Decision	3	3:00
2014-03-29	Win	(Belgium) Youssef Boughanem	MAX Muay Thai 7	Paris, France	Decision	5	3:00
2014-03-08	Win	(Netherlands) Albert Kraus	Glory 14: Zagreb	Zagreb, Croatia	Decision (split)	3	3:00
2013-12-10	Win	(Japan) Tomoyuki Nishikawa	MAX Muay Thai 5: The Final Chapter	Khon Kaen, Thailand	TKO (cut)	1	
2013-10-06	Win	(Japan) Tamoaki Makino	MAX Muay Thai 4	Sendai, Japan	Decision	3	3:00
2013-06-29	Win	(South Africa) Warren Stevelmans	MAX Muay Thai 2	Pattaya, Thailand	Decision	3	3:00
2013-05-06	Draw	(Germany) Enriko Kehl	MAX Muay Thai 1	Surin, Thailand	Draw	3	3:00
2013-02-02	Loss	(Morocco) Karim Ghajji	La Nuit des Titans, Finals	Tours, France	KO (left knee and right overhand)	1	
Fight was for La Nuit des Titans Tournament title (-72.5 kg).
2013-02-02	Win	(Belarus) Yury Bessmertny	La Nuit des Titans, Semi Finals	Tours, France	Extension round decision	4	3:00
2013-01-26	Win	(Australia) Frank Giorgi	Yokkao Extreme 2013	Milan, Italy	TKO (high kick)	2	
2012-12-15	Win	(England) Jordan Watson		Bangkok, Thailand	Decision	5	3:00
2012-09-19	Win	(France) Yohan Lidon	Thai Fight: Lyon	Lyon, France	Decision	3	3:00
2012-07-27	Win	(Brazil) Thiago Teixeira	WMC Prince's Cup 2012, Final	Bangkok, Thailand	Decision (Unanimous)	5	3:00
Wins WMC Prince's Cup 2012 Tournament title (-72 kg).
2012-07-27	Win	(Suriname) Marco Piqué	WMC Prince's Cup 2012, Semi Final	Bangkok, Thailand	KO	1	
2012-06-14	Win	(Belgium) Youssef Boughanem	Best of Siam	Paris, France	TKO (Dislocated Shoulder)	2	
2012-03-17	Win	(France) Fabio Pinca	La Nuit des Titans	Tours, France	Decision (Unanimous)	5	3:00
Wins "Time Fight" Muaythai title (-67 kg).
2012-02-11	Win	(Thailand) Prakysiang Kaiyanghadaogym	Siam Boxing Stadium	Bangkok, Thailand	KO	1	
Wins Lumpinee Stadium Welterweight title (147 lbs).
2012-01-03	Win	(Thailand) Prakysiang Kaiyanghadaogym	Petchyindee Fight, Lumpinee Stadium	Bangkok, Thailand	Decision	5	3:00
2011-11-10	Win	(China) Dong Wenfei	Chinese Kung Fu vs Muaythai	Hainan, China	TKO	2	
2011-10-28	Loss	(Thailand) Prakysiang Kaiyanghadaogym	Toyota Vigo Marathon 2011 (-72 kg), Semi Final	Nakhon Ratchasima, Thailand	Decision		
2011-10-28	Win	(Sweden) Tobias Alexander	Toyota Vigo Marathon 2011 (-72 kg), Quarter Final	Nakhon Ratchasima, Thailand	TKO	1	
2011-09-30	Win	(Thailand) Kongjak Sor. Tuantong	Petchyindee Fight, Lumpinee Stadium	Bangkok, Thailand	Decision	5	3:00
2011-07-16	Win	(United States) William Sriyapai	Push Kick Promotions "World Stand Off"	Pomona, California	TKO	3	0:58
2011-05-24	Loss	(Thailand) Superball Lookjaomaesaivaree	Wanweraphon Fight, Lumpinee Stadium	Bangkok, Thailand	Decision	5	3:00
2011-04-26	Win	(Thailand) Petchmankong Kaiyanghadaogym	Petchpiya Fight, Lumpinee Stadium	Bangkok, Thailand	TKO	5	
2011-03-25	Win	(Algeria) Yassine Darkrim	Toyota Vigo Marathon 2011 (-70 kg), Final	Saraburi Province, Thailand	TKO (Lowkicks)	2	
Wins Toyota Vigo Marathon 2011 Tournament title (-70 kg).
2011-03-25	Win	(France) Mickael Lallemand	Toyota Vigo Marathon 2011 (-70 kg), Semi Final	Saraburi Province, Thailand	TKO	1	
2011-03-25	Win	(Spain) Jorge Asensi	Toyota Vigo Marathon 2011 (-70 kg), Quarter Final	Saraburi Province, Thailand	TKO	1	
2011-01-13	Loss	(Thailand) Sitthichai Sitsongpeenong	Rajadamnern Stadium	Bangkok, Thailand	Decision	5	3:00
2010-12-04	Win	(Thailand) Yodkhunphon F.A.Group	Omnoi Boxing Stadium	Bangkok, Thailand	TKO	2	
Wins WMC Welterweight World Muaythai title (147 lbs).
2010-10-29	Win	(Iran) Vahid Rossani	Toyota Vigo Marathon 2010, Final	Udon Thani, Thailand	Decision	5	3:00
Wins Toyota Vigo Marathon 2010 Tournament title (154 lbs).
2010-10-29	Win	(France) Antuan Siangboxing	Toyota Vigo Marathon 2010, Semi Final	Udon Thani, Thailand	Decision (2-1)	5	3:00
2010-10-29	Win	(Spain) Emad Saber	Toyota Vigo Marathon 2010, Quarter Final	Udon Thani, Thailand	TKO (Punches)	2	
2010-09-22	Win	(Thailand) Kongjak Sor. Tuantong	Daorungprabath Fight, Rajadamnern Stadium	Bangkok, Thailand	Decision	5	3:00
2010-07-14	Win	(Thailand) Farsura Wor.Phetpoon	Wanmitchai Fights, Rajadamnern Stadium	Bangkok, Thailand	Decision	5	3:00
2009-05-23	Loss	(Slovakia) Vladimír Moravčík	Profiliga Muay Thai IX	Banská Bystrica, Slovakia	Decision	5	3:00
2006-02-02	Loss	(Thailand) Lamtong 13Reanresort	Phettongkham Fights, Rajadamnern Stadium	Bangkok, Thailand	Decision	5	3:00
2005-11-22	Win	(Thailand) Chatree P.Laser	P.Pramuk Fights, Lumpinee Stadium	Bangkok, Thailand	Decision	5	3:00
2005-08-19	Loss	(Thailand) Loh-ngern Pitakkruchaidan	Phetsupapan Fights, Lumpinee Stadium	Bangkok, Thailand	Decision	5	3:00
2005-07-20	Win	(Thailand) Dendanai Kiatsakkongka	Daorungchujarean Fights, Rajadamnern Stadium	Bangkok, Thailand	Decision	5	3:00
2005-05-05	Win	(Thailand) Kompayak Fairtex	Phettongkam Fights, Rajadamnern Stadium	Bangkok, Thailand	Decision	5	3:00
2005-04-04	Win	(Thailand) Pirabkao P.Pleya	S.Wanchard Fights, Rajadamnern Stadium	Bangkok, Thailand	Decision	5	3:00
2004-09-16	Loss	(Thailand) Rungruanglek Lukprabat	Wansongchai Fights, Rajadamnern Stadium	Bangkok, Thailand	Decision	5	3:00
2004-08-05	Win	(Thailand) Orono Mueangsima	Wansongchai Fights, Rajadamnern Stadium	Bangkok, Thailand	Decision	5	3:00
2004-06-03	Loss	(Thailand) Rungruanglek Lukprabat	Wansongchai Fights, Rajadamnern Stadium	Bangkok, Thailand	Decision	5	3:00
2004-05-03	Win	(Thailand) Wannar Kaewnorasing	Wansongchai Fights, Rajadamnern Stadium	Bangkok, Thailand	Decision	5	3:00
2004-04-05	Win	(Thailand) Rittijak Kaewsamrit	Wansongchai Fights, Rajadamnern Stadium	Bangkok, Thailand	Decision	5	3:00
2004-03-04	Win	(Thailand) Pandin S.Damrongrit	Wansongchai Fights, Rajadamnern Stadium	Bangkok, Thailand	Decision	5	3:00
2003-12-07	Loss	(Thailand) Hongdeang K.Bangkui	Rajadamnern Stadium	Bangkok, Thailand	Decision	5	3:00
2003-10-28	Loss	(Thailand) Pesarddeang K.Bankkui	Lumpinee Stadium	Bangkok, Thailand	KO	2	
2003-08-28	Win	(Thailand) Tapraya Kimcheangkorsang	Rajadamnern Stadium	Bangkok, Thailand	Decision	5	3:00
2003-	Win	(Thailand) Prabsuek Phayaksuphapan		Bangkok, Thailand	KO	4	
2003-	Win	(Thailand) Wangchannoi Kiatbadin		Bangkok, Thailand	Decision	5	3:00
2003-	Win	(Thailand) Tapraya Kimcheangkorsang		Bangkok, Thailand	Decision	5	3:00
2003-	Win	(Thailand) Tapraya Kimcheangkorsang		Bangkok, Thailand	Decision	5	3:00
Legend: Win Loss Draw/No contest Notes

== See also ==
- List of male kickboxers
