= Frank Giorgi =

Australian-Italian Muay Thai kickboxer (born 1981)

- Born: Frank Sebastian Giorgi; 22 September 1981 (age 45); Adelaide, South Australia, Australia
- Other names: Lo Stallone Italiano (The Italian Stallion)
- Nationality: Australian
- Height: 1.75 m (5 ft 9 in)
- Weight: 70 kg (150 lb; 11 st)
- Division: Middleweight; Super Middleweight
- Style: Muay Thai
- Stance: Orthodox
- Fighting out of: Gold Coast, Queensland, Australia
- Team: Matrix Gym; Five Rings Dojo; Scorpion Gym
- Trainer: Richard Walsh; Arslan Magomedov
- Years active: 2003–present

Kickboxing record
- Total: 56
- Wins: 45
- By knockout: 25
- Losses: 11
- Draws: 0

Other information
- Occupation: Stonemason
- Spouse: Amy
- Children: Frank Giorgi, Jr. Sebastian Giorgi
- Website: www.frankgiorgi.com
- Last updated on: 14 December 2013

Frank Sebastian Giorgi (born 22 September 1981) is an Australian-Italian Muay Thai kickboxer who competes in the middleweight division. Known for his boxing skills, Giorgi made a name for himself domestically by becoming a two-time Australian champion before emerging internationally in 2011 when he won his first world title and reached the final of the Thai Fight 70 kg/154 lb Tournament in Thailand.

== Early life ==
An Italian Australian and a stonemason by trade, Giorgi was born to Italian parents (San Luca) in Adelaide, South Australia in 1981 and raised on the Gold Coast, Queensland. He was first introduced to combat sports at the age of twelve when his uncle Frank Mesiti took him to a boxing gym in Southport, Queensland.

There he met his partner of 15 years Amy Cameron, who was a Muay Thai fighter at the time. Admittedly, he was never dedicated to boxing and, although he had a small number of amateur boxing matches, he eventually switched to Muay Thai and began fighting after six months of training.

== Career ==
Giorgi turned professional after eleven amateur fights and lost to Ben NTG in his debut. After initially starting out training under Richard Walsh at Five Rings Dojo, where he was a training partner of Australian great Nathan Corbett, he later became a student of Arslan Magomedov at Scorpion Gym following a period of upheaval. He established himself domestically by capturing both the WKN and the WMC national titles and taking wins over the likes of Bruce Macfie. Giorgi made the pilgrimage to Thailand for the first time in 2005 and would later win the Shell Tournament at Omnoi Stadium in Bangkok.

On 9 April 2011, he rematched Bruce Macfie at Evolution 23 in Brisbane, Australia and won by unanimous decision to take the WMC Intercontinental Super Middleweight (−76.2 kg/168 lb) Championship.

Following this, Giorgi was selected as a participant on The Challenger Muay Thai reality television show in Kuala Lumpur, Malaysia, which featured sixteen fighters from around the world competing for a $100,000 prize. He was eliminated at the opening stage when he lost to eventual finalist Marco Piqué on points.

He was then scheduled to face the legendary John Wayne Parr for the WMC World Middleweight (−72.58 kg/160 lb) title at Evolution 24 in Brisbane on 3 September 2011 but Parr was forced to withdraw after suffering a hand injury in training and Nonsai Srisuk came in as his replacement. Giorgi defeated the Thai by split decision after an entertaining, back-and-forth fight to become a world champion for the first time.

Just twenty-two days later, he was back in action in the quarter-finals of the Thai Fight 2011 70 kg/154 lb Tournament in Bangkok where he outpointed Vuyisile Colossa to book his place in the semis against Abraham Roqueñi on 27 November 2011. The Spaniard hurt him twice in the second round but was unable to finish him off and Giorgi came back to steal the fight in the third, roughing up Roqueñi in the clinch. He met Thai superstar Buakaw Por. Pramuk in the final on 18 December 2011 and lost on the judges' scorecards. Buakaw delivered a virtuoso performance, delivering punches to the head and body, thips, knees and sweeps that Giorgi simply couldn't defend against.

On 27 April 2012, Giorgi defeated Tobias Alexandersson on points on the Gold Coast to win the vacant WKN World Welterweight (−69.9 kg/154.1 lb) Muay Thai strap. He had originally been set to face Antuan Siangboxing but he was injured and had to pull out. Two weeks later in Melbourne, Australia, he went up against Steve Moxon in a match that many believed would crown the country's top 70 kg/154 lb kickfighter. With Giorgi being a Muay Thai stylist and Moxon a kickboxer, the fight took place under modified Muay Thai rules which excluded elbow strikes. Moxon floored Giorgi in the first round, but Giorgi then kept him at bay with kicks for the next four and was given the nod via split decision.

In July 2012, Giorgi moved into the top ten in the middleweight world rankings for the first time in his career, coming in at #7. A rematch with Nonsai was set to go down at Total Carnage II on the Gold Coast on 1 September 2012 but Rhyse Saliba stepped in as a late replacement for Nonsai who could not enter the country due to visa issues, and Giorgi defeated him via a clear cut unanimous decision. Overtaken by up-and-coming European talent such as Shemsi Beqiri, Murthel Groenhart and Davit Kiria, Giorgi dropped out of the middleweight world rankings in December 2012.

He took on surging Thai Aikpracha Meenayothin at Yokkao Extreme 2013 in Milan, Italy on 26 January 2013 and was dropped twice in round two, once with a left cross and then again with a high kick, causing the referee to wave off the fight.

He defeated Elliot Compton at Legacy 2 in Queensland on 22 November 2013.

At Total Carnage IV held in Gold Coast on 14 December 2013, Giorgi lost a unanimous decision to Marco Tentori.

On 13 May 2016 Giorgi took TKO victory over Harald Olsen at Thunderdome XV in Perth, Australia

== Personal life ==
Giorgi has two sons, Sebastian and Frankie, with his partner of 15 years Amy and is a Catholic. He also follows football and supports AC Milan.

== Championships and awards ==
=== Kickboxing ===
- Omnoi Stadium
  - Shell Tournament Championship
- Thai Fight
  - Thai Fight 2011 70 kg/154 lb Tournament runner-up
- World Kickboxing Network
  - WKN Australian Super Welterweight (-72.6 kg/160 lb) Championship
  - WKN World Welterweight (−69.9 kg/154.1 lb) Muay Thai Championship
- World Muaythai Council
  - WMC Australian Championship
  - WMC Intercontinental Super Middleweight (−76.2 kg/168 lb) Championship
  - WMC World Middleweight (−72.58 kg/160 lb) Championship

== Kickboxing record ==
Kickboxing record
45 wins (25 KOs), 11 losses, 0 draws
Date	Result	Opponent	Event	Location	Method	Round	Time
2016-10-14	Loss	(New Zealand) Brad Riddell	Powerplay Promotions 31	Australia	Decision (split)	5	3:00
2013-12-14	Loss	(Australia) Marco Tentori	Total Carnage IV	Gold Coast, Queensland	Decision (unanimous)	5	3:00
2013-11-22	Win	(Australia) Elliott Compton	Legacy 2	Queensland, Australia			
2013-01-26	Loss	(Thailand) Aikpracha Meenayothin	Yokkao Extreme 2013	Milan, Italy	TKO (high kick)	2	
2012-09-01	Win	(Australia) Rhyse Saliba	Total Carnage II	Gold Coast, Queensland	Decision (unanimous)	5	3:00
2012-04-28	Win	(Australia) Steve Moxon	The Showdown	Melbourne, Australia	Decision (split)	3	3:00
2012-04-07	Win	(Sweden) Tobias Alexandersson	Total Carnage I	Gold Coast, Queensland	Decision	5	3:00
Wins the WKN World Welterweight (−69.9 kg/154.1 lb) Muay Thai Championship.
2011-12-18	Loss	(Thailand) Buakaw Por. Pramuk	THAI FIGHT 2011 – 70 kg Tournament Final	Bangkok, Thailand	Decision	3	3:00
For the 2011 THAI FIGHT 70 kg/154lbs Tournament Championship.
2011-11-27	Win	(Spain) Abraham Roqueñi	THAI FIGHT 2011 – 70 kg Tournament Semi Finals	Bangkok, Thailand	Decision	3	3:00
2011-09-25	Win	(South Africa) Vuyisile Colossa	THAI FIGHT 2011 – 70 kg Tournament Quarter Finals	Bangkok, Thailand	Decision	3	3:00
2011-09-03	Win	(Thailand) Nonsai Srisuk	Evolution 24	Brisbane, Australia	Decision (split)	5	3:00
Wins the WMC World Middleweight (−72.58 kg/160 lb) Championship.
in 2011	Loss	(Suriname) Marco Piqué	The Challenger Muay Thai, First Round	Kuala Lumpur, Malaysia	Decision	5	3:00
2011-04-09	Win	(Australia) Bruce Macfie	Evolution 23	Brisbane, Australia	Decision (unanimous)	5	3:00
Wins the WMC Intercontinental Super Middleweight (−76.2 kg/168 lb) Championship.
2010-11-27	Win	(Australia) Bruce Macfie	Evolution 22	Brisbane, Australia	KO	2	
2010-10-30	Win	(Thailand) Tum Mardsua	War on the Shore 18	Gold Coast, Queensland	KO		
2010-03-13	Win	(Australia) Dusan Salva	Domination 4	Bentley, Australia	Decision	5	3:00
Wins the WKN Australian Super Welterweight (-72.6 kg/160 lb) Championship.
2009-11-14	Win	(Australia) Andrew Rakowski	Knees of Fury 27	Adelaide, Australia	TKO (cut)	1	
in 2007	Win	(China) Dong Jiang Tao	Xplosion 17	Gold Coast, Queensland	KO (right low kick)	2	
2007-06-22	Win	(Australia) Brad Small	Xplosion 16	Gold Coast, Queensland	TKO (punches)	2	
2006-11-25	Win	(Australia) Eli Madigan	Evolution 9	Brisbane, Australia			
2005-11-15	Loss	(Australia) Andrew Keogh	Evolution 6	Brisbane, Australia	Decision (split)	3	3:00
Legend: Win Loss Draw/no contest Notes
