= Yuri Bessmertny =

Belarusian kickboxer

- Born: Yuri Gorbachev; August 27, 1987 (age 39); Minsk, Byelorussian SSR, Soviet Union
- Native name: Юрый Бяссмертны
- Other names: The Prince
- Nationality: Belarusian
- Height: 1.82 m (5 ft 11 1/2 in)
- Weight: 73 kg (161 lb; 11.5 st)
- Division: Middleweight; Super Middleweight
- Style: Kickboxing, Muay Thai
- Stance: Orthodox
- Fighting out of: Minsk, Belarus
- Team: Gridin Gym
- Trainer: Andrei Gridin
- Years active: 2004-present

Kickboxing record
- Total: 66
- Wins: 44
- By knockout: 19
- Losses: 20
- Draws: 2
- Last updated on: April 5, 2014

Yuri Gorbachev (Belarusian: Юрый Гарбачоў, born August 27, 1987), better known as Yuri Bessmertny (Belarusian: Юрый Бяссмертны), is a Belarusian Muay Thai kickboxer who competes in the middleweight and super middleweight divisions. After taking up Muay Thai at thirteen years old, he began his career in 2004 and rose to prominence by becoming a five-time national champion at both amateur and professional levels. Having established himself domestically, he then went on to win numerous European, intercontinental and world titles while fighting mostly in the former Soviet Union. In 2011, he won the Fight Code Dragon Series tournament featuring sixteen top 72.5 kg/160 lb fighters from around the world to break into the middleweight elite.

== Early life ==
Although born as Yuri Gorbachev, he fights under the surname Bessmertny, which means "immortal" in Belarusian. He began practicing Muay Thai at the age of thirteen at the encouragement of his mother and considers legendary boxer Roy Jones Jr. an idol of his.

== Career ==
After amassing around seventy bouts in amateur competition, Bessmertny turned professional and soon became a five-time national champion, three times under Oriental rules and twice in Muay Thai. Having outgrown the domestic scene, he then started fighting around the former Soviet Union and became a world champion for the first time in 2006 when he won the S-1 title in Poland.

He debuted in the K-1 promotion on March 17, 2007, competing in the K-1 East Europe MAX 2007 eight-man tournament in Vilnius, Lithuania. After beating local fighter Romualdas Klimavičius on points in the quarter-finals, he was eliminated in the semis when he lost to Moldova's Andrey Vakarash after an extension round. Various other belts would then follow as Bessmertny took the WAKO European title and the WMF world title in 2007, the WAKO world title in 2008, the WAKO World Cup in 2009, the World Kickboxing Federation (WKF) intercontinental title in 2010 and the World Fights of Kick Boxing (WFKB) world title in 2011.

In 2011, Bessmertny was invited to compete in the Fight Code Dragon Series, a sixteen-man -72.5 kg/160 lb tournament held throughout Europe that year. At the competition's opening round in Budapest, Hungary on May 1, 2011, he outpointed Selmedin Didic to book his place in the quarter-finals where he was forced to fight Armen Petrosyan twice. The pair first met in Marseille, France, on October 15, 2011, with Bessmertny coming away with a controversial split decision win. As the Petrosyan camp disputed the decision, a rematch was set for Geneva, Switzerland on November 26, 2011, and Bessmertny put a decisive end to the bout this time. Petrosyan came out aggressive in round one but was caught with a counter punch and knocked down. After beating the referee's count, the Italian kept up the aggression and was hit with a vicious right hook again, this time knocking him out.

The semi-finals and the final of the tournament were both held on the same night on December 17, 2011, in Debrecen, Hungary. Bessmertny floored local fighter Norbert Balogh in rounds one and three en route to a unanimous decision win in the semis and came up against Thai star Sudsakorn Sor Klinmee in the final. Sudsakorn struggled with stamina problems throughout and Bessmertny was able to pick him apart over the three rounds to take another unanimous points victory, earning himself the tournament title and $80,000 in prize money.

Coming off of the Fight Code tournament win, Bessmertny broke into the top ten in the world rankings for the first time in January 2012, placing at #7. In his first bout as a world-ranked fighter, he took on former K-1 standout Gago Drago at Thai Boxe Mania in Turin, Italy, on February 24, 2012. After outstriking Drago for two rounds, Bessmertny landed a high kick in the third which sent the Armenian faceplanting unconscious into the canvas. He was then expected to face Fabio Sicilliani at Oktagon 2012 in Milan, Italy, on March 24, 2012 but Sicilliani was replaced by Cristian Milea. Bessmertny won via technical knockout in round three due to a corner stoppage.

Bessmertny returned to Fight Code to compete in the 2012 Dragons Series, which was expanded to thirty-two participants, and took a lackluster points win over Edvin Erik Kibus at the opening stage in his hometown of Minsk on April 14, 2012. He would be unable to defend his crown, however, as the promotion held just one more event before going out of business.

In his next outing, he fought to a draw with Issam Reghi at La Nuit des Challenges 11 in Lyon, France, on June 2, 2012 and, having gone undefeated in the first half of the year, moved up to #5 in the world rankings in July 2012.

He was scheduled to fight Abraham Roqueñi at Nitrianska Noc Bojovnikov in Nitra, Slovakia on October 27, 2012, but pulled out of the fight due to injury. Bessmertny made his return against Roberto Cocco at a weight of 75 kg/165 lb at another Thai Boxe Mania event in Torino on November 24, 2012, and won by TKO due to a cut in round two. Even though the cut was caused by an accidental headbutt, Bessmertny was given the win rather than the bout being made a no contest. Having not picked up a win in the -72.5 kg/160 lb division in eight months, Bessmertny dropped out of the middleweight world rankings in December 2012.

Bessmertny took on his second Thai opponent in the form of Aikpracha Meenayothin in the semi-finals of a four-man tournament at La Nuit des Titans 2013 in Tours, France, on February 2, 2013. Although he was bettered in round one and three, Bessmertny managed to score a standing eight count in the second which resulted in the bout being called a draw and taking it into an extension round. In the fourth round, however, Aikpracha was just too much and took the decision.

Dropping down to 70 kg/154 lb, he lost a unanimous decision to Ashihara karate stylist Davit Kiria at Glory 7: Milan in Milan on April 20, 2013. In the semi-finals of the -71 kg/156 lb tournament at the Legend Fighting Show in Moscow, Russia on May 25, 2013, he lost to Artur Kyshenko by unanimous decision after an extra round. Bessmertny was to fight in the WKN Big 8 Tournament 2013 in Minsk, Belarus on June 3, 2013, and meet Dmitry Valent in the quarter-finals but it fell through, and he instead took on Karim Ghajji at Time Fight 3 in Tours, France, on June 15, 2013, and his slow start was once again his downfall as he lost by unanimous decision for the third consecutive time. He lost to Steve Moxon by UD at Kings of Kombat 10 in Melbourne, Australia on September 7, 2013. On October 11, 2013, Bessmertny was outpointed bt Djimé Coulibaly at Warriors Night in Issy-les-Moulineaux, France.

He put an end to his five-fight losing skid when he defeated Warren Stevelmans by UD at Thai Boxe Mania in Turin, Italy on January 25, 2014. Following this, he knocked out Abdallah Mabel in round two at Nitrianska Noc Bojovníkov in Nitra on March 1, 2014. Bessmertny lost to Andy Souwer via UD at Legend 3: Pour Homme in Milan on April 5, 2014.

== Championships and awards ==
=== Kickboxing ===
- Belarusian Kickboxing
  - Belarusian Kickboxing Championship (three times)
  - Belarusian Muay Thai Championship (two times)
- Fight Code
  - Fight Code Dragon Series (-72.5 kg/160 lb) 2011 Championship
- S-1
  - S-1 World Championship
- World Association of Kickboxing Organizations
  - 2013 W.A.K.O. Pro K-1 Rules Middleweight World Champion -75 kg
  - WAKO European Championship
  - WAKO World Championship
  - 2009 WAKO World Cup Championship
- World Fights of Kick Boxing
  - WFKB World Championship
- World Kickboxing Federation
  - WKF Intercontinental -72.3 kg/159.394 lb Championship
- World Muaythai Federation
  - WMF World Championship

== Kickboxing record ==
Kickboxing record
43 wins (19 KOs), 20 losses, 2 draws
Date	Result	Opponent	Event	Location	Method	Round	Time
2019-10-12	Win	(Italy) Giuseppe De Domenico	Bellator Kickboxing 12	Italy	Decision (unanimous)	3	3:00
2019-07-08	Loss	(Uzbekistan) Sher Mamazulunov	Fair Fight IX	Yekaterinburg, Russia	Decision (unanimous)	5	3:00
2019-04-26	Win	(China) Juncheng Chang	Tatneft Cup	Russia	Decision	4	3:00
2018-12-01	Win	(France) Karim Ghajji	Bellator Kickboxing 11	Italy	Decision (unanimous)	3	3:00
2018-09-22	Win	(Estonia) Maxim Vorovski	Nr1 Fight Show	Estonia	Decision	3	3:00
2018-02-24	Loss	(France) Djibril Ehouo	ACB KB 13: From Paris with war	Paris, France	Decision (unanimous)	3	3:00
2017-10-14	Draw	(Slovakia) Vladimír Moravčík	Rebuy Stars Fight Night	Slovakia	Draw	3	3:00
2017-03-25	Win	(France) Djibril Ehouo	ACB KB 9: Showdown in Paris	Paris, France	Decision	3	3:00
2017-01-28	Win	(France) Alassane SY	Thai Boxe Mania 2017	Turin, Italy	Decision	3	3:00
2016-12-10	Win	(Moldova) Denis Apăvăloaie	KOK World GP in Moldova Vol. 42	Chișinău, Moldova	KO	2	2:29
2016-10-16	Loss	(China) Duoli Chen	ACB KB 8: Only The Braves	Hoofddorp, Netherlands	Decision	3	3:00
2016-06-10	Loss	(Morocco) Walid Haddad	A-ONE WGP, Semi Finals	Toulon, France	Decision	3	3:00
2014-10-23	Loss	(France) Cedric Doumbe	A1 WCC Lyon, Semi Finals	Lyon, France	TKO (cut)	3	
2014-05-27	Win	(Netherlands) Ajay Balgobind	Mix Fighter	Minsk, Belarus	Ext. R. TKO	4	
2014-04-05	Loss	(Netherlands) Andy Souwer	Legend 3: Pour Homme	Milan, Italy	Decision (unanimous)	3	3:00
2014-03-01	Win	(France) Abdallah Mabel	Nitrianska Noc Bojovníkov	Nitra, Slovakia	KO	2	
2014-01-25	Win	(South Africa) Warren Stevelmans	Thai Boxe Mania	Turin, Italy	Decision (unanimous)	3	3:00
2013-10-11	Loss	(France) Djimé Coulibaly	Warriors Night	Issy-les-Moulineaux, France	Decision	3	3:00
2013-09-07	Loss	(Australia) Steve Moxon	Kings of Kombat 10	Melbourne, Australia	Decision (unanimous)	3	3:00
2013-06-15	Loss	(Morocco) Karim Ghajji	Time Fight 3	Tours, France	Decision (unanimous)	3	3:00
2013-05-25	Loss	(Ukraine) Artur Kyshenko	Legend Fighting Show, Semi Finals	Moscow, Russia	Extension round decision (unanimous)	4	3:00
2013-04-20	Loss	(Georgia (country)) Davit Kiria	Glory 7: Milan	Milan, Italy	Decision (unanimous)	3	3:00
2013-03-09	Win	(Russia) Aleksandr Zakharov	Monte Carlo Fighting Masters	Monte Carlo, Monaco	Decision	5	3:00
Wins W.A.K.O. Pro K-1 rules middleweight world title -75 kg.
2013-02-02	Loss	(Thailand) Aikpracha Meenayothin	La Nuit des Titans 2013, Semi Finals	Tours, France	Extension round decision	4	3:00
2012-11-24	Win	(Italy) Roberto Cocco	Thai Boxe Mania	Turin, Italy	TKO (cut)	2	
2012-06-02	Draw	(France) Issam Reghi	La Nuit des Challenges 11	Lyon, France	Draw	5	3:00
2012-04-14	Win	(Estonia) Edvin Erik Kibus	Fight Code Dragon Series 2012 Part 2, First Round	Minsk, Belarus	Decision (unanimous)	3	3:00
2012-03-24	Win	(Romania) Cristian Milea	Oktagon 2012	Milan, Italy	TKO (corner stoppage)	3	
2012-02-05	Win	(Armenia) Gago Drago	Thai Boxe Mania	Turin, Italy	KO (right high kick)	3	
2011-12-17	Win	(Thailand) Sudsakorn Sor Klinmee	Fight Code Dragon Series 2011 Part 5, Final	Debrecen, Hungary	Decision (unanimous)	3	3:00
Wins the Fight Code Dragon Series (-72.5 kg/160 lb) 2011 Championship.
2011-12-17	Win	(Hungary) Norbert Balogh	Fight Code Dragon Series 2011 Part 5, Semi Finals	Debrecen, Hungary	Decision (unanimous)	3	3:00
2011-11-26	Win	(Italy) Armen Petrosyan	Fight Code Rhinos Series 2011 Part 5, Quarter Finals	Geneva, Switzerland	KO (right hook)	1	
2011-10-15	Win	(Italy) Armen Petrosyan	Fight Code Dragon Series 2011 Part 4, Quarter Finals	Marseille, France	Decision (split)	3	3:00
2011-05-28	Loss	(Morocco) Amin Choukoud	Tatneft Cup 2011 Part 6, Semi Finals	Kazan, Russia	Decision (unanimous)	4	3:00
2011-05-01	Win	(Switzerland) Selmedin Didic	Fight Code Dragon Series 2011 Part 3, First Round	Budapest, Hungary	Decision	3	3:00
2011-02-12	Win	(Republic of Ireland) Anthony Kane	Tatneft Cup 2011 Part 3, Quarter Finals	Kazan, Russia	Decision (unanimous)	4	3:00
2010-12-30	Win	(Armenia) Antoli Hunanyan	Heroe's Gate	Prague, Czech Republic	TKO	5	
Wins the WKF Intercontinental -72.3 kg/159.394 lb Championship.
2009-06-25	Loss	(Kyrgyzstan) Kumar Zhaliev	WBKF European -76 kg/167 lb Championships, Semi Finals	Moscow, Russia	Decision (unanimous)	3	3:00
2009-04-16	Loss	(Russia) Urunbeck Esenkulov	Tatneft Cup 2009 Part 5, Semi Finals	Kazan, Russia	Decision (unanimous)	3	3:00
2009-01-31	Win	(Russia) Akhmed Oligov	Tatneft Cup 2009 Part 3, Quarter Finals	Kazan, Russia	KO (right hook)	3	
2008-11-01	Win	(Armenia) Temur Hudoyan	Gladiators 2	Ufa, Russia	TKO (cut)	4	
2008-06-28	Loss	(Slovakia) Vladimír Moravčík	PROFILIGA Muay Thai VII	Banská Bystrica, Slovakia	Decision	5	3:00
2007-12-19	Win	(Moldova) Sergey Stoyanov	WBKF European -76 kg/167 lb Championships, Semi Finals	Moscow, Russia	KO	1	
2007-05-16	Win	(Moldova) Sergey Stoyanov	Fight Club Arabat	Moscow, Russia	Decision (unanimous)	3	3:00
2007-03-17	Loss	(Moldova) Andrey Vakarash	K-1 East Europe MAX 2007, Semi Finals	Vilnius, Lithuania	Extension round decision	3	3:00
2007-03-17	Win	(Lithuania) Romualdas Klimavičius	K-1 East Europe MAX 2007, Quarter Finals	Vilnius, Lithuania	Decision	3	3:00
2004-11-30	Win	(Russia) Marat Gereev	Russian Muaythai League	Moscow, Russia	TKO	5	
Legend: Win Loss Draw/no contest Notes
