= Andrey Gerasimchuk =

Belarusian Muay Thai kickboxer (born 1987)

- Born: Andrey Gerasimchuk; February 7, 1987 (age 39); Minsk, Byelorussian SSR, Soviet Union
- Other names: Achilles
- Nationality: Belarusian
- Height: 1.97 m (6 ft 5 1/2 in)
- Weight: 98 kg (216 lb; 15.4 st)
- Division: Heavyweight
- Style: Muay Thai, kickboxing
- Stance: Orthodox
- Fighting out of: Minsk, Belarus
- Team: Kick Fighter Muaythai Gym
- Trainer: Evgeniy Dobrotvorskiy
- Years active: 2009 - present

Kickboxing record
- Total: 27
- Wins: 17
- By knockout: 7
- Losses: 9
- No contests: 1
- Last updated on: February 1, 2015

Andrey Gerasimchuk (born February 7, 1987) is a Belarusian Muay Thai kickboxer who competes in the heavyweight division. He is a three-time Kunlun Fight Tournament winner.

He was ranked as a top ten heavyweight by Combat Press from October 2015 until July 2018, when he was dropped from the rankings following an 18-month period of inactivity.

== Kickboxing career ==
=== Kunlun Fight ===
Gerasimchuk fought in the 2014 Kunlun Fight Super Heavyweight tournament. He knocked out Arnold Oborotov in the semifinals, and defeated Dmitri Bezus by unanimous decision in the finals. He then fought in the 2014 Kunlun Fight Heavyweight tournament. He beat Abdarhmane Coulibaly by unanimous decision in the semifinals, and won the tournament with a third-round TKO of Wang Chongyang in the finals. He followed up this tournament win with decision wins over Sergio Pique and Rico Verhoeven.

Gerasimchuk participated in the 2015 Super Heavyweight tournament, after qualifying to it with a decision win against Ashwin Balrak at Kunlun Fight 18. He knocked out Steve Banks in the quarterfinal, but lost to Hesdy Gerges in the semifinal by split decision.

Gerasimchuk took part in the 2016 Kunlun Fight Super Heavyweight tournament, held at Kunlun Fight 52. In the quarterfinals, he beat Bruno Susano by unanimous decision and Atha Kasapis in the same manner in the semifinal. He faced Tsotne Rogava in the finals, and won the fight by decision, after an extra round was fought.

His last fight with Kunlun Fight came against Felipe Micheletti at Kunlun Fight 56. He won the fight by unanimous decision.

=== Glory ===
He made his organizational debut against Bruno Chaves at Glory 73: Shenzhen, after nearly three years away from the sport. The fight ended in a no contest after 69 seconds, as Gerasimchuk was unable to continue due to a low blow.

== Championships and awards ==
=== Professional ===
- World Kickboxing Network
  - 2011 WKN European Oriental Rules Super Light Heavyweight Championship
- W5 Professional Kickboxing
  - 2011 W5 European 86 kg Championship
- Kunlun Fight
  - 2014 Kunlun Fight 100 kg Tournament winner
  - 2014 Kunlun Fight 95 kg Tournament winner
  - 2016 Kunlun Fight 100 kg Tournament winner

=== Amateur ===
- 5x Belarusian Championship K-1 (gold) 86 kg (2009, 2010, 2011, 2012, 2013)
- World Association of Kickboxing Organizations
  - 2008 WAKO World Cup (Hungary) (gold) 86 kg
  - 2009 WAKO World Cup (Hungary) (gold) 86 kg
- International Federation of Muaythai Associations
  - 2009 IFMA European Championship (Latvia) (gold) 86 kg
  - 2009 IFMA World Championship (Thailand) (gold) 86 kg
  - 2010 IFMA European Championship (Italy) (silver) 86 kg
  - 2010 IFMA World Championship (Thailand) (silver) 86 kg
  - 2011 IFMA European Championship (gold) 86 kg
  - 2011 IFMA World Championship (Uzbekistan) (bronze) 86 kg
  - 2012 IFMA European Championship (Turkey) (bronze) 86 kg
  - 2012 IFMA World Championship (Russia) (bronze) 86 kg
  - 2014 IFMA European Championship (Poland) (gold) + 91 kg
  - 2015 IFMA World Championship (Thailand) (gold) +91 (Best Fighter of the World Championship Award)
  - 2016 IFMA World Championships (Sweden) (gold) + 91 kg
  - 2017 IFMA World Championships (Belarus) (bronze) + 91 kg
  - 2018 IFMA European Championship (Czechia) (bronze) + 91 kg

== Fight record ==
Professional kickboxing record
18 wins (7 (T)KOs), 9 losses, 0 draws, 1 no contest
Date	Result	Opponent	Event	Location	Method	Round	Time
2019-12-07	NC	(Brazil) Bruno Chaves	Glory 73: Shenzhen	Shenzhen, China	No contest (accidental foul)	1	1:09
2017-01-02	Win	(Brazil) Felipe Micheletti	Kunlun Fight 56	Sanya, Hainan, China	Decision (unanimous)	3	3:00
2016-09-11	Win	(Ukraine) Tsotne Rogava	Kunlun Fight 52 100+ kg 2016 Tournament Final	China	Extra round decision	4	3:00
Wins Kunlun Fight 100+ kg 2016 Tournament Title.
2016-09-11	Win	(Greece) Atha Kasapis	Kunlun Fight 52 2016 Super Heavyweight Tournament Semi-Finals	China	Decision (unanimous)	3	3:00
2016-07-30	Win	(Portugal) Bruno Susano	Kunlun Fight 48: Super Heavyweight Tournament, Final 8	Jinan, China	Decision (unanimous)	3	3:00
2015-06-07	Loss	(Netherlands) Hesdy Gerges	Kunlun Fight 26 - Super Heavyweight Tournament, Semi Finals	Chongqing, China	Decision (split)	3	3:00
2015-03-17	Win	(United States) Steve Banks	Kunlun Fight 21 - Super Heavyweight Tournament, Quarter Finals	Sanya, China	KO		
2015-02-01	Win	(Suriname) Ashwin Balrak	Kunlun Fight 18: The Return of the King - Super Heavyweight Tournament, Final 16	Guangzhou, China	Decision (unanimous)	3	3:00
2015-01-03	Win	(Netherlands) Rico Verhoeven	Kunlun Fight 15	Nanjing, China	Decision (unanimous)	3	3:00
2014-12-05	Win	(Suriname) Sergio Pique	Kunlun Fight 14	Bangkok, Thailand	Decision (unanimous)	3	3:00
2014-09-13	Win	(China) Wang Chongyang	Kunlun Fight 10, Final	Minsk, Belarus	TKO	3	
Wins Kunlun Fight 10 Tournament Title -95 kg.
2014-09-13	Win	(France) Abdarhmane Coulibaly	Kunlun Fight 10, Semi Finals	Minsk, Belarus	Decision (unanimous)	3	3:00
2014-06-29	Win	(Ukraine) Dmitri Bezus	Kunlun Fight 6, Final	Chongqing, China	Decision (unanimous)	3	3:00
Wins Kunlun Fight 100 kg Tournament.
2014-06-29	Win	(Lithuania) Arnold Oborotov	Kunlun Fight 6, Semi Finals	Chongqing, China	KO	3	
2013-12-20	Loss	(Russia) Nadir Gadzhiev	Night of Muaythai 3	Moscow, Russia	Decision (split)	3	3:00
2013-06-15	Loss	(France) Nordine Mahiedinne	Battle of Saint Raphael	Saint-Raphaël, Var, France	Decision	3	3:00
2013-04-20	Loss	(Russia) Alexei Papin	Battle at Moscow 11	Moscow, Russia	Decision (majority)	3	3:00
2012-12-16	Loss	(France) Patrice Quarteron	Thai Fight 2012 Heavyweight Tournament, Semi Finals	Bangkok, Thailand			
2012-11-08	Loss	(Russia) Kurban Omarov	Open Balkan Gran Pri WAKO-Pro	Tiraspol, Moldova	Decision (majority)	3	3:00
2012-05-01	Loss	(Russia) Alexei Papin	Papin vs Gerasimchuk	Moscow, Russia	Decision (unanimous)	5	3:00
2012-03-11	Win	(Russia) Aleksandr Dmitrenko	Best Fighter - Russia vs. Belarus	Samara, Russia	KO (right cross)	1	
2012-02-04	Win	(Russia) Rashid Abdurakhmanov	Corona Cup 18	Moscow, Russia	RTD	4	
2011-10-20	Win	(Russia) Ivan Pentka	W5	Krasnodar, Russia	KO	1	2:45
Wins W5 European Title -86 kg.
2011-09-10	Win	(Azerbaijan) Annar Mammadov		Minsk, Belarus	Decision	3	3:00
2011-06-18	Win	(France) Jean Philippe Ghigo	Grand Gala De Boxe Grasse	Grasse, France	Decision	5	3:00
Wins WKN European Oriental Rules Super Light Heavyweight Championship -85.5 kg.
2009-10-30	Win	(Russia) Stanislav Popov	PFAMT Muaythai event	Omsk, Russia	KO (right hook)	2	
2007-02-21	Loss	(Ukraine) Andrey Osatchiy	Fight Club Arbat	Moscow, Russia	Decision (unanimous)	3	3:00
2006-07-19	Loss	(Russia) Denis Grachev	Fight Club Arbat	Moscow, Russia	Decision (unanimous)	3	3:00
Legend: Win Loss Draw/no contest Notes

Amateur Muay Thai record
Date	Result	Opponent	Event	Location	Method	Round	Time
2018-07-04	Loss	(Turkey) Bugra Erdogan	2018 IFMA European Championships, Semi Final	Prague, Czech Republic	Decision (30:27)	3	3:00
Wins 2018 IFMA European Championships +91kg Bronze Medal.
2018-07-01	Win	(Norway) Alf Gibson	2018 IFMA European Championships, Quarter Final	Prague, Czech Republic	WO		
2017-05-10	Loss	(Iran) Iraj Azizpour	IFMA World Championship 2017, Semi Final	Minsk, Belarus	KO	3	3:00
Wins 2017 IFMA World Championships +91kg Bronze Medal.
2017-05-07	Win	(South Korea) Januwon Kyeon	IFMA World Championship 2017, Quarter Final	Minsk, Belarus	RSC.O	1	
2016-05-28	Win	(Ukraine) Tsotne Rogava	2016 IFMA World Championships, Final	Jönköping, Sweden	Decision	3	3:00
Wins 2016 IFMA World Championships +91kg Gold Medal.
2016-05-28	Win		2016 IFMA World Championships, Semi Final	Jönköping, Sweden			
2015-08-	Win	(Russia) Kirill Kornilov	2015 IFMA World Championships, Final	Bangkok, Thailand	Decision	3	3:00
Wins 2015 IFMA World Championships +91kg Gold Medal.
2015-08-	Win	(Kazakhstan) Nikolay Guessev	2015 IFMA World Championships, Semi Final	Bangkok, Thailand	RSC.B	1	
2014-09-	Win	(Poland) Tomasz Szczepkowski	2014 IFMA European Championships, Final	Kraków, Poland	Decision	3	3:00
Wins 2014 IFMA European Championships +91kg Gold Medal.
2012-09-11	Loss	(Russia) Artem Vakhitov	2012 IFMA World Championships, Semi Finals	Saint Petersburg, Russia	Decision		
Wins 2012 IFMA World Championships -86kg Bronze Medal.
2012-09-09	Win	(Australia) Gareth Rees	2012 IFMA World Championships, Quarter Finals	Saint Petersburg, Russia			
2012-05-	Loss	(Ukraine) Alexander Oleinik	2012 IFMA European Championships, Semi Final	Antalya, Turkey	Decision	4	2:00
Wins 2012 IFMA European Championships -86kg Bronze Medal.
2011-04-	Win	(Russia) Artem Vakhitov	2011 IFMA European Championships -86 kg/189 lb, Final	Antalya, Turkey	Decision	4	2:00
Wins 2011 IFMA European Championships -86kg Gold Medal.
2010-12-	Loss	(Ukraine) Alexander Oleinik	2010 I.F.M.A. World Muaythai Championships, Finals	Bangkok, Thailand	Decision	4	2:00
Wins 2010 IFMA World Championships -86kg Silver Medal.
2010-12-	Win	(France) Mickael Yapi	2010 I.F.M.A. World Muaythai Championships, Semi Finals	Bangkok, Thailand			
2010-05-	Loss	(Ukraine) Alexander Oleinik	2010 IFMA European Championships, Final	Italy	Decision	4	2:00
Wins 2010 IFMA European Championships -86kg Silver Medal.
2009-12-	Win	(Uzbekistan) Javlon Nazarov	2009 IFMA World Championships, Final	Bangkok, Thailand	Decision	4	2:00
Wins 2009 IFMA World Championships -86kg Gold Medal.
2009-12-	Win	(Ukraine) Alexander Oleinik	2009 IFMA World Championships, Semi Finals	Bangkok, Thailand	Decision	4	2:00
Legend: Win Loss Draw/no contest Notes

== See also ==
- List of male kickboxers
