= TatNeft Arena =

Sports arena in Kazan, Russia

Tatneft Arena
- Татнефть-Арена

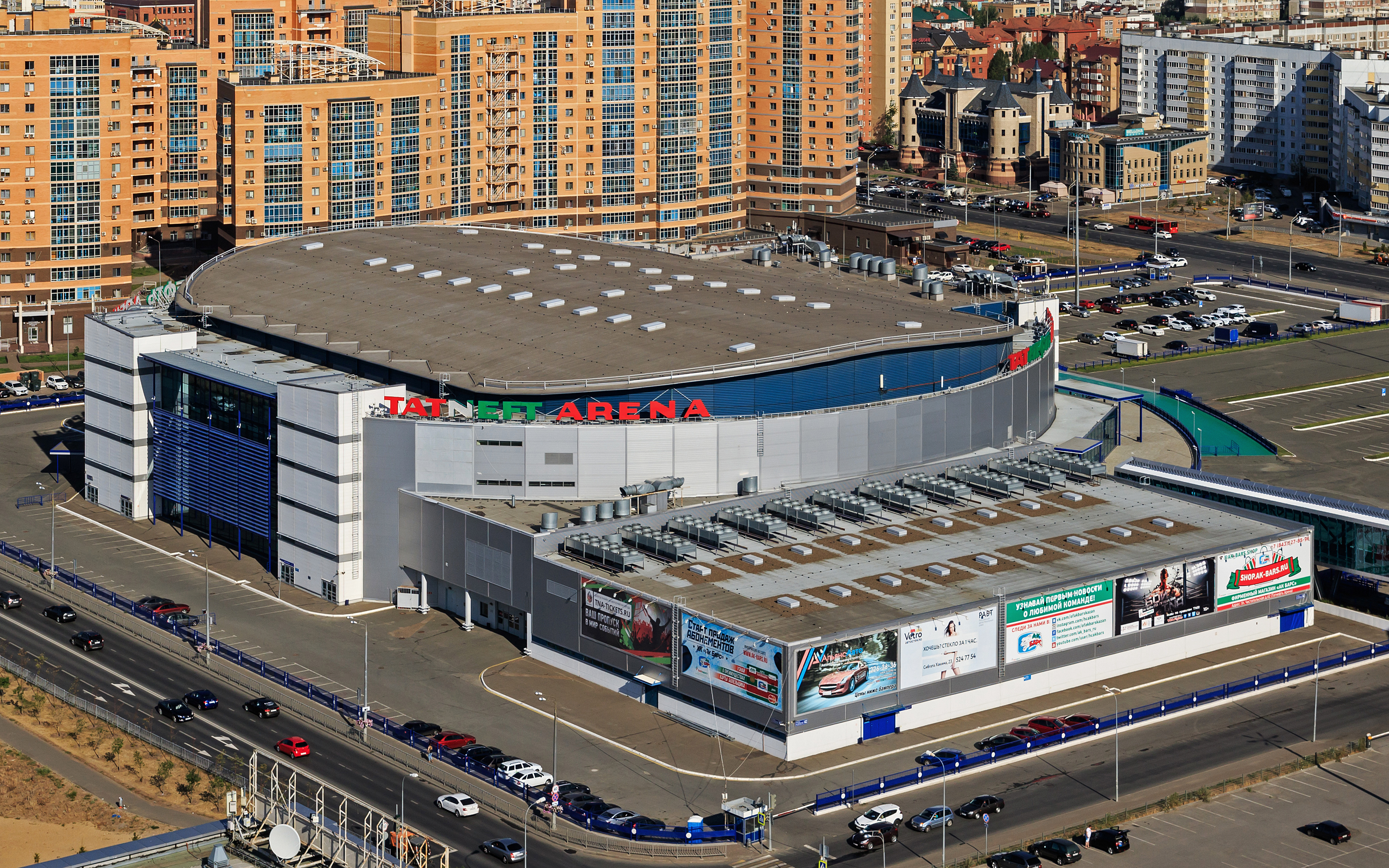
- Interactive map of Tatneft Arena
- Location: Kazan, Russia
- Coordinates: 55°49′2″N 49°7′28″E
- Capacity: Kickboxing/Boxing: 9,500; Ice Hockey: 8,937; Concerts: 10,400
- Field size: 60×28 m

Construction
- Opened: August 29, 2005
- Cost: $50 Million USD

Tenants
- Ak Bars Kazan (KHL) (2005–present); JHC Bars (MHL) (2009–present)

Website
- www.tatneftarena.ru

Tatneft Arena (ru: Татнефть Арена) is an indoor sporting arena located in Kazan, Russia. The venue got its name due to a sponsorship with Tatneft, a Russian oil producing company. Opened in 2005, the capacity of the arena is 8,890 for a hockey game and around 10,000 for concerts. The arena is home to Ak Bars Kazan of the Kontinental Hockey League.

== See also ==
- List of indoor arenas in Russia
