= Ky Hollenbeck =

American kickboxer (born 1987)

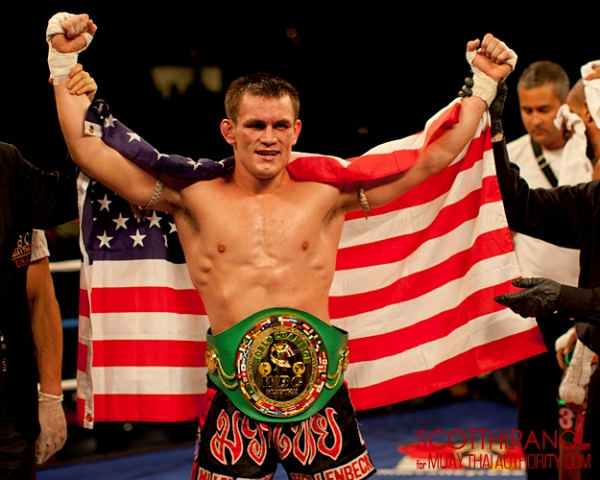
- Born: Ky Conrad Hollenbeck; June 17, 1987 (age 39); San Bruno, California, United States
- Height: 1.76 m (5 ft 9 1/2 in)
- Weight: 70.0 kg (154.3 lb; 11.02 st)
- Division: Welterweight; Middleweight; Super Middleweight; Light Heavyweight
- Reach: 70.0 in (178 cm)
- Style: Muay Thai
- Stance: Orthodox
- Fighting out of: San Francisco, California, United States
- Team: World Team USA
- Trainer: Kru Sam Phimsouthsam
- Years active: 2006-present

Kickboxing record
- Total: 26
- Wins: 20
- By knockout: 9
- Losses: 5
- By knockout: 3
- Draws: 1

Mixed martial arts record
- Total: 6
- Wins: 5
- By knockout: 1
- By submission: 4
- Losses: 1
- By decision: 1
- Last updated on: June 21, 2014

Ky Conrad Hollenbeck (born June 17, 1987) is an American Muay Thai kickboxer who competes in the middleweight division. He won national and North American titles as an amateur in his teens before turning professional in 2007 and beating Billy Evangelista for the California state belt. He soon began competing internationally and rose to prominence when he took a decision victory over Steve Moxon in the final of a four-man tournament in 2010. The following year, Hollenbeck outpointed Gregory Choplin for the WBC Muaythai Interim World Middleweight Championship and then debuted in the Glory promotion in May 2012.

An aggressive and dynamic fighter, Hollenbeck uses a large arsenal of attacks and possesses considerable punching power.

== Career ==
=== Early career (2006–2010) ===
Born and raised in the San Francisco Bay Area, Hollenbeck began wrestling at the age of ten and took up Muay Thai at fifteen initially to give him an edge against opponents while street fighting. However, under the guidance of Kru Sam Phimsoutham at the World Team USA gym, he was able to channel his aggression off the streets and into the ring, winning national and North American titles as an amateur nak muay.

While studying kinesiology at the University of Hawaiʻi, Hollenbeck turned professional and soon found himself fighting in K-1. At the K-1 World Grand Prix 2007 in Hawaii on April 28, 2007, he knocked out Mighty Mo, Jr., the fourteen-year-old son of Mighty Mo, with a spinning back kick in the first round. Upon his return to the mainland, he won the IMTO California Light Heavyweight Championship by defeating Billy Evangelista on points in Fresno, California, on November 10, 2007. In addition to the striking credentials, he also holds a purple belt in Brazilian jiu-jitsu under Ralph Gracie and pursued a career in mixed martial arts between 2007 and 2009, going 5–1 with four submission wins and one KO. He ultimately decided to continue with Muay Thai, citing opportunities to fight internationally in the sport as the deciding factor.

=== International emergence (2010–2012) ===
In his first international match-up, Hollenbeck knocked out Shawn Lee inside the opening frame at the Legends of Heroes: Muaythai vs. Kung Fu event held in Pahang, Malaysias's Arena of Stars. He then won a four-man 72.5 kg/160 lb tournament held over two days in Haikou, Haidian Island, China. In the semi-finals on December 18, 2010, he defeated Pavel Obozny via technical knockout due to knee strikes in round three before taking a unanimous decision over Steve Moxon in the final on December 19 to win the tournament title and $10,000 in prize money.

He was scheduled to face Joe Schilling for the WBC Muaythai United States Super Middleweight (-76.204 kg/168 lb) Championship on March 5, 2011, in Los Angeles, California but he pulled out of that bout and was then expected to fight Yohan Lidon in a WBC Muaythai World Middleweight (-72.575 kg/160 lb) title match in April 2011. The fight did not materialise, however, and he instead fought Vuyisile Colossa for the WCK Muay Thai World Middleweight (-75 kg/165.3 lb) title in Nanning, China on April 23, 2011. He outpointed his South African opponent over the five rounds to take the belt. Less than a month later, on May 14, 2011, Hollenbeck beat Gregory Choplin by way of unanimous decision to be crowned the WBC Muaythai Interim World Middleweight Champion at Lion Fight: Battle in the Desert 2 in Primm, Nevada. Utilizing a wide array of attacks including flying knees and spinning elbows, he took the decision on score cards of 50–45, 50–45 and 49–46. Then, in his third fight in as many months, he TKO'd Wong Foo Long in the second round of their contest in Manila, Philippines on June 26, 2011. This despite his opponent coming in 4.5 kg/10 lb over the agreed weight limit. Initially, it was expected that Hollenbeck would compete in the four-man Shandong World Sanda Tournament at the event but he was replaced by Dorian Price.

A fight between Hollenbeck and Gornpet DeJrat was booked for Push Kick: World Stand Off in Pomona, California, on July 16, 2011, but the event was cancelled. On August 20, 2011, he made the first defence of his WBC Interim World title with a unanimous decision win over a resilient Simon Chu at Lion Fight: Battle in the Desert 3 in Primm.

Having signed with the short-lived Muaythai Premier League in August, Ky Hollenbeck debuted with the promotion against Jordan Watson at Muaythai Premier League: Strength and Honor in Padua, Italy on October 8, 2011, and scored an upset as he floored the Englishman with a spinning backfist early on and won the three round bout by unanimous decision. In his sophomore appearance in the MPL, he tasted defeat for the first time in his professional career when he dropped a unanimous decision to Nieky Holzken at Muaythai Premier League: Blood and Steel on November 6, 2011, in The Hague, Netherlands. Holzken knocked Hollenbeck down with a left hook after countering a flying knee in round one, and again with a spinning back kick and body shots as the final bell rang.

Hollenbeck was set to fight John Wayne Parr at Knees of Fury 36 in Adelaide, Australia on February 25, 2012, but Parr was forced to withdraw after breaking his index finger in training and was replaced by Kym Johnson. Hollenbeck then also pulled out of the fight for unknown reasons. He instead kicked off his 2012 campaign against Cyrus Washington at the Legends Muay Thai Championship in his home town of San Francisco, California on April 28 and won with a vicious spinning elbow KO in round one to take the WMC Intercontinental Middleweight (-72.58 kg/160 lb) belt.

=== Glory (2012–present) ===
Hollenbeck was recruited by the newly founded Glory kickboxing organization in April 2012 and was immediately entered into the 2012 70 kg/154 lb Slam tournament, made up of sixteen of the world's best middleweight kickfighters. He was matched with fellow American Michael Corley at the tournament's opening stage, held in Stockholm, Sweden at Glory 1: Stockholm - 2012 70kg Slam First 16 on May 26, 2012, and forced a standing eight count after rocking Corley with a right overhand in the opening seconds. He then swarmed on his opponent, causing referee Joop Ubeda to call a halt to the contest at the 0:47 mark of the first round.

Another big fight then fell through for Hollenbeck as his match with Aikpracha Meenayotin at Push Kick: Thailand vs. The Americas in Pomona on August 18, 2012, was scrapped. Initially, Malaipet Sasiprapa filled in when Aikpracha withdrew but eventually the bout was cancelled.

He was drawn against pound for pound great Giorgio Petrosyan in the quarter-finals of the 2012 Glory tournament at Glory 3: Rome - 2012 70kg Slam Final 8 on November 3, 2012, in Rome, Italy. With his hair dyed in the colours of the American flag, Hollenbeck entered the fight as a massive underdog. Petrosyan scored a knockdown in round one with a perfectly timed right hook and, while Hollenbeck recovered from this blow, he suffered a torn anterior cruciate ligament and bowed out from this in round two.

When Jordan Watson was unable to compete against Albert Kraus at Glory 10: Los Angeles - Middleweight World Championship Tournament in Ontario, California, on September 28, 2013, due to visa issues, Ky Hollenbeck stepped in to take his place, completing his comeback from injury. He won a dominant unanimous decision.

He was scheduled face Shemsi Beqiri in the tournament reserve match at Glory 12: New York - Lightweight World Championship Tournament in New York City, on November 23, 2013. However, Beqiri withdrew for undisclosed reasons and was replaced by Warren Stevelmans. In an ugly fight where Hollenbeck used his unorthodox style consisting of clinching and spinning back fists, he was able to outpoint the South African for much of the bout and scored a standing eight count with a knee in round two before winning a unanimous decision.

Hollenbeck was set to face Andy Ristie for the inaugural Glory Lightweight (-70 kg/154 lb) Championship at Glory 14: Zagreb in Zagreb, Croatia on March 8, 2014. He withdrew from the match, however, in order to pursue a career in firefighting and the fight coincided with important dates of his training program. He was replaced by Davit Kiria.

The Hollenbeck-Ristie fight was then scheduled for Glory 17: Los Angeles in Inglewood, California, on June 21, 2014. Hollenbeck was stunned by a jab from Ristie before being knocked out with a left hook thirty-five seconds into round one.

=== Lion Fight ===
Hollenbeck was scheduled to face Richard Abraham Lion Fight 24 on November 23, 2015. He won the fight by unanimous decision, with scores of 40–36, 40–36 and 39–37.

Hollenbeck was scheduled to face Justin Greskiewicz at Lion Fight 28 on February 26, 2016. He won the fight by a third-round technical knockout.

Hollenbeck was scheduled to face Mark Holst at Lion Fight 30 on July 10, 2016. He won the fight by a technical split decision, with scores of 28–29, 29–28 and 29–28.

== Championships and awards ==
=== Kickboxing ===
- International Muay Thai Organization
  - IMTO California Light Heavyweight Championship
- International Sport Karate Association
  - ISKA Amateur North American Light Heavyweight (-81.4 kg/179.5 lb) Championship
- Muay Thai Authority.com
  - 2010 North American Breakthrough Fighter of the Year
  - 2011 North American Male Fighter of the Year
- United States Muaythai Federation
  - USMF Amateur Welterweight Championship
- World Boxing Council Muaythai
  - WBC Muaythai Interim World Middleweight (-72.575 kg/160 lb) Championship
- World Championship Kickboxing Muay Thai
  - WCK Muay Thai 72.5 kg/160 lb Tournament Championship
  - WCK Muay Thai World Middleweight (-75 kg/165.3 lb) Championship
- World Muaythai Council
  - WMC Intercontinental Middleweight (-72.58 kg/160 lb) Championship

== Kickboxing record ==
Kickboxing record
20 wins (9 KOs), 5 losses, 1 draw
| Date | Result | Opponent | Event | Location | Method | Round | Time | Record |
| 2016-07-10 | Win | (Canada) Mark Holst | Lion Fight 30 | United States | Decision (split） | 4 | 1:52 | |
| 2016-02-26 | Win | (United States) Justin Greskiewicz | Lion Fight 28 | United States | TKO (right elbow) | 3 | 2:09 | |
| 2015-11-23 | Win | (United States) Richard Abraham | Lion Fight 24 | Connecticut, United States | Decision (unanimous) | 3 | 3:00 | 18-3-1 |
| 2014-06-21 | Loss | (Suriname) Andy Ristie | Glory 17: Los Angeles | Inglewood, California, United States | KO (left jab and left hook) | 1 | 0:35 | 17-3-1 |
| 2013-11-23 | Win | (South Africa) Warren Stevelmans | Glory 12: New York - Lightweight World Championship Tournament, Reserve Match | New York City, New York, United States | Decision (unanimous) | 3 | 3:00 | 17-2-1 |
| 2013-09-28 | Win | (Netherlands) Albert Kraus | Glory 10: Los Angeles | Ontario, California, United States | Decision (unanimous) | 3 | 3:00 | 16-2-1 |
| 2012-11-03 | Loss | (Italy) Giorgio Petrosyan | Glory 3: Rome - 70 kg Slam Tournament, Quarter Finals | Rome, Italy | TKO (knee injury) | 2 | 0:34 | 15-2-1 |
| 2012-05-26 | Win | (United States) Michael Corley | Glory 1: Stockholm - 70 kg Slam Tournament, First Round | Stockholm, Sweden | TKO (referee stoppage) | 1 | 0:47 | 15-1-1 |
| 2012-04-28 | Win | (United States) Cyrus Washington | Legends Muay Thai Championship | San Francisco, California, United States | KO (spinning elbow) | 1 | | 14-1-1 |
Wins the WMC Intercontinental Middleweight (-72.58kg/160lb) Championship.
| 2011-11-06 | Loss | (Netherlands) Nieky Holzken | Muaythai Premier League: Blood and Steel | The Hague, Netherlands | Decision (unanimous) | 3 | 3:00 | 13-1-1 |
| 2011-10-08 | Win | (England) Jordan Watson | Muaythai Premier League: Strength and Honor | Padua, Italy | Decision (unanimous) | 3 | 3:00 | 13-0-1 |
| 2011-08-20 | Win | (England) Simon Chu | Lion Fight: Battle in the Desert 3 | Primm, Nevada, United States | Decision (unanimous) | 5 | 3:00 | 12-0-1 |
Defends the WBC Muaythai Interim World Middleweight (-72.575kg/160lb) Championship.
| 2011-06-26 | Win | (China) Wong Foo Long | WCK Muay Thai | Manila, Philippines | TKO (referee stoppage) | 3 | 2:11 | 11-0-1 |
| 2011-05-14 | Win | (France) Gregory Choplin | Lion Fight: Battle in the Desert 2 | Primm, Nevada, United States | Decision (unanimous) | 5 | 3:00 | 10-0-1 |
Wins the WBC Muaythai Interim World Middleweight (-72.575kg/160lb) Championship.
| 2011-04-23 | Win | (South Africa) Vuyisile Colossa | WCK Muay Thai | Nanning, China | Decision | 5 | 3:00 | 9-0-1 |
Wins the WCK Muay Thai World Middleweight (-75kg/165.3lb) Championship.
| 2010-12-19 | Win | (Australia) Steve Moxon | WCK Muay Thai 72.5 kg/160 lb Tournament, Final | Haikou, China | Decision (unanimous) | 3 | 3:00 | 8-0-1 |
Wins WCK Muay Thai 72.5kg/160lb Tournament Championship.
| 2010-12-18 | Win | (Russia) Pavel Obozny | WCK Muay Thai 72.5 kg/160 lb Tournament, Semi Finals | Haikou, China | TKO (knees) | 3 | | 7-0-1 |
| 2010-10-09 | Win | (Malaysia) Shawn Lee | Legends of Heroes: Muaythai vs. Kung Fu | Pahang, Malaysia | KO | 1 | | 6-0-1 |
| 2010-07-18 | Win | (United States) Kenny Finister | Tuff Promotions: WMC Full Rules Muay Thai | Montebello, California, United States | KO (knee) | 2 | 1:17 | 5-0-1 |
| 2010-05-01 | Loss | (China) Zhang Xijie | Wu Lin Feng | Henan, China | Decision | 3 | 3:00 | |
| 2010-01-15 | Loss | (China) Hong Guang | Wu Lin Feng | Henan, China | TKO (cut) | 3 | | |
For IKKC International Super-Middleweight (-75 kg/165.3 lb) Championship.
| 2008-07-26 | Win | (United States) Jared Lara | WCK Muay Thai | Las Vegas, Nevada, United States | TKO | 1 | 1:20 | 4-0-1 |
| 2007-11-10 | Win | (United States) Billy Evangelista | Warrior's Challenge | Fresno, California, United States | Decision | 5 | 3:00 | 3-0-1 |
Wins IMTO California Light Heavyweight Championship.
| 2007-04-28 | Win | (United States) Mighty Mo, Jr. | K-1 World Grand Prix 2007 in Hawaii | Honolulu, Hawaii, United States | KO (spinning back kick) | 1 | 1:48 | 2-0-1 |
| 2006-06-25 | Win | (Russia) Oleg Jerebnenko | The Gladiators Conquest | Brooklyn, New York, United States | Decision | 5 | 3:00 | 1-0-1 |
Legend: Win Loss Draw/no contest Notes

== Mixed martial arts record ==
Mixed martial arts record
5 wins (1 KO, 4 submissions), 1 loss, 0 draws
| Date | Result | Opponent | Event | Location | Method | Round | Time | Record |
| 2009-10-10 | Win | (United States) Lucas Gamaza | X-Fight Promotions: War of the Heroes 4 | Santa Clara, California, US | Technical submission (guillotine choke) | 2 | 0:28 | 5-1 |
| 2009-07-18 | Loss | (United States) Jeremiah Metcalf | Cage Combat FC: Rush | San Francisco, California, US | Decision (unanimous) | 3 | 5:00 | 4-1 |
| 2009-02-21 | Win | (United States) Pat Minihan | Cage Combat FC 10: Battle for Nor-Cal | Santa Rosa, California, US | Submission (rear-naked choke) | 1 | 4:24 | 4-0 |
| 2008-08-23 | Win | (United States) Bobby Cearley | Cage Combat FC: Rumble in the Park | Fresno, California, US | Submission (armbar) | 1 | 2:04 | 3-0 |
| 2008-05-17 | Win | (United States) Darrin Freeman | Cage Combat FC: Mayhem | Santa Rosa, California, USA | TKO (punches) | 1 | 2:04 | 2-0 |
| 2007-10-06 | Win | (United States) John Preston | Cage Combat FC: Undefeated | California, US | Submission (keylock) | 1 | | 1-0 |
Legend: Win Loss Draw/no contest Notes
