= Andy Ristie =

Surinamese-Dutch kickboxer (born 1982)

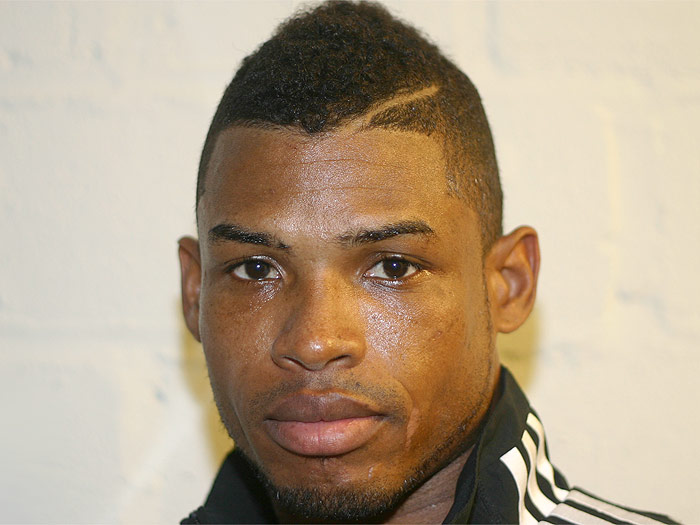
- Born: March 17, 1982 (age 44); Paramaribo, Suriname
- Other names: The Machine
- Height: 1.82 m (5 ft 11 1/2 in)
- Weight: 70.0 kg (154.3 lb; 11.02 st)
- Division: Lightweight; Welterweight
- Reach: 77.0 in (196 cm)
- Style: Kickboxing, Muay Thai
- Stance: Orthodox
- Fighting out of: Amsterdam, Netherlands
- Team: Team Ristie (2013–present)
- Years active: 2004–present

Kickboxing record
- Total: 55
- Wins: 48
- By knockout: 28
- Losses: 6
- By knockout: 1
- Draws: 1
- Last updated on: June 21, 2014

Andy Ristie (born March 17, 1982) is a Surinamese-Dutch kickboxer who competes in the lightweight division. After an unremarkable beginning to his career, he came to prominence with a lengthy and entertaining winning streak in the It's Showtime promotion in 2011 and 2012. This earned him an invite to fight amongst the 70 kg/154 lb division's elite, competing in the K-1 World MAX 2012 Tournament and debuting in Glory shortly after.

Standing at 1.82 m (5 ft 11 1/2 in), Ristie is tall for his weight class and is known to look for knockouts from the first bell. He utilizes devastating knee strikes to the body and possesses considerable punching power, especially in his left hook. As of 2 November 2015, he is ranked the No. 2 lightweight in the world by GLORY.

== Career ==
=== Early career (2002–2011) ===
Ristie was born in Paramaribo, Suriname in 1982 and relocated to Amsterdam, Netherlands where he was trained by Lucien Carbin at Fight Club Carbin. He began training Muay Thai at the age of 22, and while he won the World Kickboxing Network (WKN) Intercontinental Super Welterweight (-72.6/160.1 lb) Championship as an amateur, the beginnings of his professional career were fought in relative obscurity. Having built up an extensive record with an impressive knockout ratio fighting in smaller events in Suriname and the Netherlands, he was recruited by the It's Showtime promotion at twenty-nine years of age. He debuted with a first-round KO of Nick Beljaards at BFN Group presents: It's Showtime Brussels in Brussels, Belgium on March 26, 2011.

On September 25, 2011, Ristie defeated William Diender via unanimous decision in the tournament reserve bout of the BFN Group & Music Hall presents: It's Showtime "Fast & Furious 70MAX" in Brussels. He followed this up with a technical knockout defeat of Jonay Risco at Street Culture, Fight Club Group & Canary Kickboxing Federation presents: It's Showtime 53 on November 12, 2011, in Tenerife, Spain. Having dominated Risco throughout the fight, Ristie floored the Spaniard with a left hook in round three and, while he was able to make it back to his feet, referee Joop Ubeda called a halt to the contest.

=== 2012–present ===
He stopped Hinata Watanabe in the first round of their contest at It's Showtime 2012 in Leeuwarden in Leeuwarden, Netherlands, on January 28, 2012. After dropping his opponent in ten seconds, he sent Hinata to the canvas twice more, forcing a referee stoppage. This win helped establish Ristie as a force on the world stage and earned him a contract with K-1. He was invited to compete alongside fifteen of the world's other top 70 kg/154 lb kickfighters in the K-1 World MAX 2012 World Championship Tournament, and faced Gago Drago in the opening stage at the K-1 World MAX 2012 World Championship Tournament Final 16 in Madrid, Spain on May 27, 2012. He began the fight by battering Drago with knees to the head and body and continued to put a one-sided beating on the Armenian throughout, winning a wide unanimous decision.

On June 30, 2012, he KO'd Samir Djabba with a left hook in the first round, after 32 seconds, Music Hall & BFN Group present: It's Showtime 57 & 58 in Brussels. Then, in his third fight in as many months, he stopped David Calvo with a knee to the body in under a minute at Street Culture, Federación Canaria de Kickboxing & Fightclub Group present: It's Showtime 59 in Tenerife on July 21, 2012. He had originally been set to face Abraham Roqueñi at the event but he withdrew due to injury a week before. After these victories, he broke the top ten in the world rankings for the first time in June 2012, coming in at No. 8.

He was expected to fight on an It's Showtime card in Yokohama, Japan, on November 17, 2012, but the event was cancelled following the promotion's acquisition by Glory and so he was transferred to Glory 2: Brussels in Belgium and put up against Nordin Benmoh. Once again, he stopped his opponent with a left hook. A rematch between Ristie and Hinata Watanabe was booked as the reserve fight for the Shoot Boxing World Tournament 2012 in Tokyo, Japan on November 17, 2012, and ended like the pair's first match ten months earlier: Hinata was cut early on and dropped with punches twice shortly after, resulting in a referee stoppage and a first-round technical knockout win for Ristie.

Ristie was drawn against Andy Souwer in the quarter-finals of the K-1 World MAX 2012 World Championship Tournament Final in Athens, Greece on December 15, 2013, but lost after a unanimous decision. Despite ending the year with a loss, he went 6–1 over the course of the twelve months, breaking into the top ten.

For his first match in 2013, Ristie was set to face four-time world champion and original K-1 World MAX winner Albert Kraus at Glory 5: London in London, England on March 23 but was unable to fight due to visa issues and was replaced by Warren Stevelmans. He was then transferred onto the Glory 6: Istanbul card in Istanbul on April 6 to face Alessandro Campagna.

The Kraus-Ristie fight was rescheduled for Glory 8: Tokyo - 2013 65kg Slam on May 3, 2013, and he won with a knee KO in round two.

He was to fight Sanny Dahlbeck at Glory 10: Los Angeles - Middleweight World Championship Tournament in Ontario, California on September 28, 2013. However, the Swede withdrew for undisclosed reasons and was replaced by Niclas Larsen. He defeated Larsen via unanimous decision.

Ristie caused one of the biggest upsets in kickboxing history when he knocked out both Giorgio Petrosyan and Robin van Roosmalen to win the Glory 12: New York - Lightweight World Championship Tournament in New York City, New York, US on November 23, 2013. Against Giorgio Petrosyan in the semi-finals, Ristie applied a lot of pressure and caused the Italian problems in finding his rhythm, but Petrosyan controlled the first two rounds nonetheless. Going into the third in need of a knockout, Ristie managed just that when he landed a huge right hand that had Petrosyan stunned only for him to follow it up with a combination of a right, left and another left that finished it, becoming the first man to stop Petrosyan and ending his forty-two fight, six year undefeated streak. Riding the wave of momentum that saw him dethrone kickboxing's all-time greatest, Ristie continued his rich vein of form in the final against Robin van Roosmalen, dropping the Dutchman towards the tail end of round one before putting him away in two. Ristie had some problems with his camp in the weeks prior to the tournament, leaving his longtime trainer Lucien Carbin to form his own Team Ristie.

He was to fight for the inaugural Glory Lightweight Championship against Ky Hollenbeck at Glory 14: Zagreb in Zagreb, Croatia on March 8, 2014 but Hollenbeck withdrew and was replaced by Davit Kiria. He dominated the Georgian for the first three rounds and scored a knockdown with a step knee in the second, but faded in the championship rounds and was stopped in the fifth.

The Hollenbeck-Ristie fight was then scheduled for Glory 17: Los Angeles in Inglewood, California, US on June 21, 2014. Andy Ristie knocked out Ky Hollenbeck thirty-five seconds into round one, stunning his American opponent with a jab before putting him away with a left hook.

On the February 6, 2015, Ristie fought Steve Moxon in a Superfight on Glory 19: USA in Hampton, Virginia, USA. He won the fight via TKO in the first round.

Ristie fought Robin van Roosmalen for the Glory Lightweight title during Glory 20: Dubai. Van Roosmalen won the fight by unanimous decision.

Andy Ristie returned to kickboxing, following a four-year hiatus, to fight Kong Lingfeng during Kunlun Fight 81. The fight went into an extra round, after which Lingfeng won a decision.

== Championships and awards ==
=== Kickboxing ===
- Glory
  - Glory Lightweight (-70kg/154.3lb) World Championship Tournament Champion
- Bloody Elbow.com
  - 2013 Knockout of the Year vs. Giorgio Petrosyan on November 23
- Liver Kick.com
  - 2013 Knockout of the Year vs. Giorgio Petrosyan on November 23
- World Kickboxing Network
  - WKN Amateur Intercontinental Super Welterweight (-72.6 kg/160.1 lb) Championship

== Kickboxing record ==
Kickboxing record
48 wins (28 KOs), 7 losses, 1 draw
Date	Result	Opponent	Event	Location	Method	Round	Time	Record
2023-12-21	Win	(Morocco) Adnane Abdelghani	Fight Fusion	Paramaribo, Suriname	Decision (unanimous)	3	3:00	48-7-1
2023-07-	Loss	(Netherlands) Figuereido Landman	House of Glory, Tournament Quarterfinals	Netherlands	Decision (Unanimous)	3	3:00	47-7-1
2019-07-27	Loss	(China) Kong Lingfeng	Kunlun Fight 81	China	Extra Round Decision	4	3:00	47-6-1
2015-04-03	Loss	(Netherlands) Robin van Roosmalen	Glory 20: Dubai	Dubai, UAE	Decision (unanimous)	5	3:00	47-5-1
For the Glory Lightweight Championship.
2015-02-06	Win	(Australia) Steve Moxon	Glory 19: Virginia	Hampton, Virginia, USA	TKO (referee stoppage)	1	2:43	47-4-1
2014-12-28	Win	(Brazil) Samuel Paiva	Star Fighters Promotion presents: "THE MACHINE IS BACK"	Paramaribo, Suriname	TKO (punches)	2		46-4-1
2014-06-21	Win	(United States) Ky Hollenbeck	Glory 17: Los Angeles	Inglewood, California, USA	KO (left jab and left hook)	1	0:35	45-4-1
2014-03-08	Loss	(Georgia (country)) Davit Kiria	Glory 14: Zagreb	Zagreb, Croatia	KO (punches)	5	2:22	44-4-1
For the Glory Lightweight Championship.
2013-11-23	Win	(Netherlands) Robin van Roosmalen	Glory 12: New York- Lightweight World Championship Tournament, Final	New York City, New York, USA	KO (left uppercut)	2	1:45	44-3-1
Wins the Glory Lightweight World Championship Tournament.
2013-11-23	Win	(Italy) Giorgio Petrosyan	Glory 12: New York – Lightweight World Championship Tournament, Semi Finals	New York City, New York, USA	KO (left uppercut)	3	0:43	43-3-1
2013-09-28	Win	(Denmark) Niclas Larsen	Glory 10: Los Angeles	Ontario, California, USA	Decision (unanimous)	3	3:00	42-3-1
2013-05-03	Win	(Netherlands) Albert Kraus	Glory 8: Tokyo	Tokyo, Japan	KO (knee)	2		41-3-1
2013-04-06	Win	(Italy) Alessandro Campagna	Glory 6: Istanbul	Istanbul, Turkey	Decision (unanimous)	3	3:00	40-3-1
2012-12-15	Loss	(Netherlands) Andy Souwer	K-1 World MAX 2012 World Championship Tournament Final, Quarter Finals	Athens, Greece	Decision (unanimous)	3	3:00	39-3-1
2012-11-17	Win	(Japan) Hinata Watanabe	Shoot Boxing World Tournament 2012, Reserve Bout	Tokyo, Japan	TKO (referee stoppage)	1	2:31	39-2-1
2012-10-06	Win	(Morocco) Nordin Benmoh	Glory 2: Brussels	Brussels, Belgium	KO (left hook)	1	2:20	38-2-1
2012-07-21	Win	(Spain) David Calvo	Street Culture, Federación Canaria de Kickboxing & Fightclub Group present: It's Showtime 59	Tenerife, Spain	KO (right knee to the body)	1	0:45	37-2-1
2012-06-30	Win	(France) Samir Djabba	Music Hall & BFN Group present: It's Showtime 57 & 58	Brussels, Belgium	KO (left hook)	1	0:32	36-2-1
2012-05-27	Win	(Armenia) Gago Drago	K-1 World MAX 2012 World Championship Tournament Final 16, First Round	Madrid, Spain	Decision (unanimous)	3	3:00	35-2-1
2012-01-28	Win	(Japan) Hinata Watanabe	It's Showtime 2012 in Leeuwarden	Leeuwarden, Netherlands	TKO (referee stoppage)	1	1:58	34-2-1
2011-11-12	Win	(Spain) Jonay Risco	Street Culture, Fight Club Group & Canary Kickboxing Federation presents: It's Showtime 53	Tenerife, Spain	TKO (left hook)	3	2:30	33-2-1
2011-09-25	Win	(Netherlands) William Diender	BFN Group & Music Hall presents: It's Showtime "Fast & Furious 70MAX", Reserve Bout	Brussels, Belgium	Decision (unanimous)	3	3:00	32-2-1
2011-03-26	Win	(Netherlands) Nick Beljaards	BFN Group presents: It's Showtime Brussels	Brussels, Belgium	KO	1		31-2-1
2010-08-29	Win	(Netherlands) Henri van Opstal	Slamm: Fighting with the Stars	Paramaribo, Suriname	Decision (unanimous)	3	3:00	30-2-1
2009-08-08	Loss	(Netherlands) Leroy Kaestner	SLAMM!! Soema Na Basi IV	Paramaribo, Suriname	Decision (unanimous)	3	3:00	29-2-1
2009-06-08	Loss	(Netherlands) Ramzi Tamaditi	Victory or Hell	Volendam, Netherlands	Decision (unanimous)	5	3:00	29-1-1
2008-00-00	Win	(Netherlands) Hermanus Wouters	Anthony Nesty Sporthal	Paramaribo, Suriname	KO (left hook)	1		29-0-1
2007-00-00	Win	(Morocco) Hossam El Boustati	Derby	Suriname	KO (Right cross)	1		
2007-00-00	Win	(Netherlands) Van Dirk	Regional Veterans	Suriname	KO	1		
2007-00-00	Win	(Netherlands) Hicham Boukhari	The Night of Honor	Suriname	KO (left cross)	1	0:19	28-0-1
Legend: Win Loss Draw/No contest Notes
