= Robin van Roosmalen =

Dutch kickboxer and mixed martial arts fighter

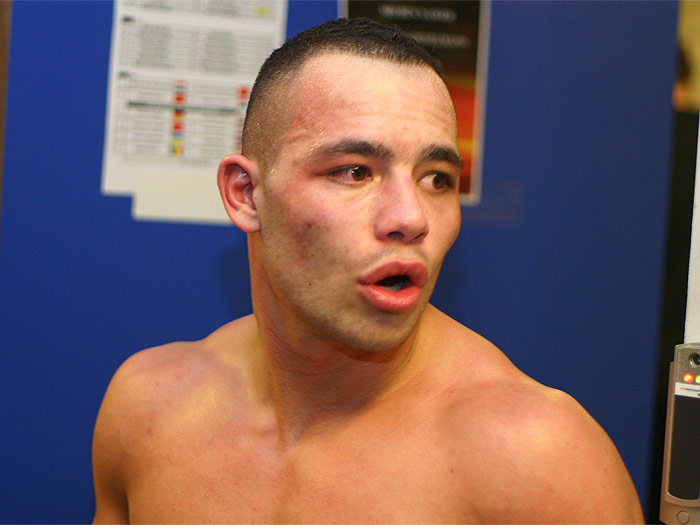
- Born: 1 October 1989 (age 37) 's-Hertogenbosch, Netherlands
- Other names: Pokerface; Leprechaun Power; RvR
- Height: 1.68 m (5 ft 6 in)
- Weight: 70.0 kg (154.3 lb; 11.02 st)
- Division: Featherweight; Lightweight; Welterweight
- Reach: 65 1/2 in (166 cm)
- Style: Kickboxing, Muay Thai, Judo
- Stance: Orthodox
- Fighting out of: Den Bosch, Netherlands
- Team: Team Van Roosmalen; Golden Glory; Team Aerts; Warrior Gym; Sanford MMA
- Trainer: William van Roosmalen; Peter Aerts; Henri Hooft (MMA); Greg Jones (wrestling)
- Rank: Black belt in Judo
- Years active: 2004–2018

Kickboxing record
- Total: 73
- Wins: 52
- By knockout: 14
- Losses: 18
- By knockout: 3
- Draws: 3

Mixed martial arts record
- Total: 2
- Wins: 2
- By knockout: 2
- Losses: 0

Other information
- Notable relatives: William van Roosmalen, father
- Mixed martial arts record from Sherdog

Robin van Roosmalen (born 1 October 1989) is a Dutch retired kickboxer and mixed martial artist. He is the former Glory Featherweight Champion and former Glory Lightweight Champion.

== Biography ==
Van Roosmalen is the oldest of three children. His father, William van Roosmalen, is a former world champion in Muay Thai and kickboxing, together with Pelé Reid, the only men to ever knock out Vitali Klitschko in a kickboxing bout (WAKO European finals, Kyiv, 1995) and also the only man to knock out William Beekwilder. Growing up in a kickboxing family, Van Roosmalen began training at the age of 3 under his father in his gym and later also began boxing, wrestling, mixed martial arts and judo, in which he received a black belt. He is known for his aggressive, high-paced fighting style.

== Kickboxing career ==
Van Roosmalen made it to the semi-finals of the K-1 World MAX West Europe Tournament by beating Henri van Opstal in the quarter-final. He lost his semi-final bout against the eventual winner Mohammed Khamal by KO. After losing a fight against Ajay Balgobind, Van Roosmalen rebounded by knocking out Dutch slugger William Diender with a liver punch and beating the highly regarded Dutch-Moroccan Chahid Oulad El Hadj by decision. On 21 May 2011, Van Roosmalen met Mohammed Khamal in a rematch in Amsterdam. He lost the match by judges' decision.

On 25 September 2011, Van Roosmalen won the It's Showtime "Fast & Furious 70MAX" title in Brussels. He beat Chahid Oulad El Hadj for the 2nd time by TKO in the second round, Chris Ngimbi by decision and Artur Kyshenko by KO in the first round. Van Roosmalen had entered the tournament as a replacement for 70MAX giant Giorgio Petrosyan, who had injured himself in his fight against Hinata, and was seen as an underdog to win the tournament over the more highly ranked and experienced Artur Kyshenko.

=== Glory ===
Van Roosmalen was drawn against Tim Thomas in the quarter-finals of the Glory 3: Rome - 2012 Middleweight Slam Final 8 on 3 November 2012, in Rome, Italy, and won by TKO in the second round when he battered the Englishman into a referee stoppage. In the semis, he dropped Sanny Dahlbeck in each of the first two rounds before finishing him with a punch to the body in the third. Advancing to the final, he went up against Giorgio Petrosyan. His aggressive style played into Petrosyan's hands, however, and he was outclassed by the silky Italian to a unanimous decision loss.

Van Roosmalen took a dominant unanimous decision over Yuichiro Nagashima at Glory 4: Tokyo - 2012 Heavyweight Grand Slam in Saitama, Japan on 31 December 2012, dropping "Jienotsu" in round one and scoring with low kicks and hard punches throughout. He dropped Murthel Groenhart in round one en route to a unanimous decision win at Glory 7: Milan in Milan, Italy on 20 April 2013. He beat Shemsi Beqiri by unanimous decision in a back-and-forth fight at Glory 10: Los Angeles - Middleweight World Championship Tournament in Ontario, California, United States, on 28 September 2013.

Van Roosmalen rematched Davit Kiria in the semi-finals of the Glory 12: New York - Lightweight World Championship Tournament in New York City, New York, US on 23 November 2013, winning a unanimous decision. In the final, he was battered by Andy Ristie, getting dropped in round one before being knocked out in two. He defeated Marat Grigorian via split decision in the co-main event of Glory 15: Istanbul in Istanbul, Turkey on 12 April 2014.

==== Lightweight champion ====
Van Roosmalen captured the Glory lightweight title with a majority decision win over Davit Kiria at Glory 18: Oklahoma on 7 November 2014. He rematched Andy Ristie at Glory 20: Dubai and retained his lightweight title with a dominant unanimous decision win after knocking Ristie down two times in the fourth round. All three judges scored the fight 49-44 in favor of Van Roosmalen. On 11 May 2015, he was ranked as the #1 lightweight in the world by LiverKick.com. He defended his title a second time, this time a unanimous decision against Sitthichai Sitsongpeenong at Glory 25: Milan. However, he would lose the title via split decision in a rematch against Sitsongpeenong at Glory 31: Amsterdam.

==== Featherweight champion ====
After losing his lightweight title, Van Roosmalen dropped down to featherweight and immediately faced Gabriel Varga for the Canadian's featherweight title. Van Roosmalen dropped Varga twice in the second round and dominated the Canadian throughout the fight, prompting the featherweight champion's corner to throw in the towel in the break between the fourth and fifth round. With this win, Van Roosmalen became the first fighter to hold a Glory title in two separate weight classes. On 29 September 2018, at Glory 59, Robin van Roosmalen was defeated by the #1 challenger and Interim champion Petchpanomrung Kiatmookao via unanimous decision (50-45, 50-45, 50-45, 50-45, 50-45).

== Mixed martial arts career ==
=== Final Fight Championship ===
In February 2016, Van Roosmalen made his professional mixed martial arts debut for Final Fight Championship. He made his debut against Theo Michailidis at FFC 22, and he won the fight via second round knockout. His next bout came on 11 March 2017 at FFC 28 against Risto Dimitrov, and he was victorious via first round technical knockout. On 13 December 2018, Van Roosmalen announced that he would be transitioning from kickboxing to MMA full-time.

=== Bellator MMA ===
On 28 May 2019, Bellator MMA president Scott Coker announced via Twitter that he signed Van Roosmalen to a multi-fight contract. Van Roosmalen was expected to make his promotional debut in a featherweight bout against Cris Lencioni at Bellator 232 on 26 October 2019. However, Van Roosmalen missed the featherweight limit by nine pounds and the bout was cancelled, with the athletic commission stating Van Roosmalen must compete at Lightweight from now on.

In September 2020, Van Roosmalen was scheduled to make his Bellator debut against Nauzet Trujillo at Bellator Europe 9 in Milan on 3 October. The bout was cancelled after he tested positive for COVID-19.

== Personal life ==
On 13 January 2021, Van Roosmalen and his younger sister were involved in a car accident in the Netherlands. Van Roosmalen was hospitalized with serious injuries and his sister died in the crash. In October 2021, he said that he was still undergoing physical and mental rehabilitation and hoped to return to combat sports. In January 2023, Omroep Brabant reported that he had undergone four operations and would not be able to return to top-level kickboxing.

== Championships & accomplishments ==
- Glory
  - Glory Featherweight Champion (two times)
  - Glory Lightweight Champion (one time)
    - Two successful title defenses
  - 2013 Glory Lightweight World Championship Tournament Runner-up
  - 2012 Glory 70kg Slam Tournament Runner-up
- It's Showtime
  - It's Showtime "Fast & Furious 70MAX" Tournament Champion

== Mixed martial arts record ==
Professional record breakdown
2 matches	2 wins	0 losses
By knockout	2	0

Res.	Record	Opponent	Method	Event	Date	Round	Time	Location	Notes
Win	2–0	Risto Dimitrov	TKO (punches)	Final Fight Championship 28	11 March 2017	1	2:56	Athens, Greece	Catchweight (152 lb) bout.
Win	1–0	Athinodoros Michailidis	TKO (punches)	Final Fight Championship 22	20 February 2016	2	2:21	Athens, Greece	Featherweight debut.

== Kickboxing record ==
Kickboxing record
52 wins (14 KOs), 18 losses
Date	Result	Opponent	Event	Location	Method	Round	Time
2018-09-29	Loss	(Thailand) Petpanomrung Kiatmuu9	Glory 59: Amsterdam	Amsterdam, Netherlands	Decision (Unanimous)	5	3:00
Lost the Glory Featherweight Championship.
2018-03-31	Win	(United States) Kevin VanNostrand	Glory 52: Los Angeles	Los Angeles, United States	Decision (Unanimous)	5	3:00
Defend the Glory Featherweight Championship.
2017-09-30	Win	(Ukraine) Serhiy Adamchuk	Glory 45: Amsterdam	Amsterdam, Netherlands	Decision (Unanimous)	5	3:00
Defend the Glory Featherweight Championship.
2017-05-20	Win	(Thailand) Petpanomrung Kiatmuu9	Glory 41: Holland	Den Bosch, Netherlands	Decision (majority)	5	3:00
Won the Glory Featherweight Championship.
2017-01-20	Win	(Canada) Matt Embree	Glory 37: Los Angeles	Los Angeles, California, US	TKO (Referee Stoppage/Punches)	4	2:00
Stripped off the title due to failing to make weight.
2016-10-21	Win	(Canada) Gabriel Varga	Glory 34: Denver	Broomfield, Colorado, US	TKO (corner stoppage)	4	3:00
Won the Glory Featherweight Championship.
2016-06-25	Loss	(Thailand) Sitthichai Sitsongpeenong	Glory 31: Amsterdam	Amsterdam, Netherlands	Decision (Split)	5	3:00
Lost the Glory Lightweight Championship Belt.
2015-11-06	Win	(Thailand) Sitthichai Sitsongpeenong	Glory 25: Milan	Monza, Italy	Decision (unanimous)	5	3:00
Defends the Glory Lightweight Championship.
2015-06-03	Win	(Australia) Steve Moxon	Friday Night Fights ‘FIGHT FOR EDUCATION’	New York, US	Decision (Unanimous)	3	3:00
2015-04-03	Win	(Suriname) Andy Ristie	Glory 20: Dubai	Dubai, UAE	Decision (unanimous)	5	3:00
Defends the Glory Lightweight Championship.
2014-11-07	Win	(Georgia (country)) Davit Kiria	Glory 18: Oklahoma	Oklahoma City, Oklahoma, US	Decision (majority)	5	3:00
Wins the Glory Lightweight Championship.
2014-04-12	Win	(Armenia) Marat Grigorian	Glory 15: Istanbul	Istanbul, Turkey	Decision (split)	3	3:00
2013-11-23	Loss	(Suriname) Andy Ristie	Glory 12: New York	New York City, New York, US	KO (left uppercut)	2	1:45
Lightweight Tournament Final For the Glory Lightweight World Championship Tournament.
2013-11-23	Win	(Georgia (country)) Davit Kiria	Glory 12: New York	New York City, New York, US	Decision (unanimous)	3	3:00
Lightweight World Championship Tournament, Semi Finals.
2013-09-28	Win	(Albania) Shemsi Beqiri	Glory 10: Los Angeles	Ontario, California, US	Decision (unanimous)	3	3:00
2013-04-20	Win	(Suriname) Murthel Groenhart	Glory 7: Milan	Milan, Italy	Decision (unanimous)	3	3:00
2012-12-31	Win	(Japan) Yuichiro Nagashima	Glory 4: Tokyo	Saitama, Japan	Decision (unanimous)	3	3:00
2012-11-03	Loss	(Italy) Giorgio Petrosyan	Glory 3: Rome	Rome, Italy	Decision (unanimous)	3	3:00
For the Glory 70kg Slam Tournament.
2012-11-03	Win	(Sweden) Sanny Dahlbeck	Glory 3: Rome	Rome, Italy	TKO (punch to the body)	3	
70 kg Slam Tournament, Semi-Finals.
2012-11-03	Win	(England) Tim Thomas	Glory 3: Rome	Rome, Italy	TKO (referee stoppage)	2	1:05
70 kg Slam Tournament, Quarter-Finals.
2012-06-30	Loss	(Morocco) Hafid el Boustati	Music Hall & BFN Group present: It's Showtime 57 & 58	Brussels, Belgium	TKO (Doctor Stoppage/Cut from knee)	2	2:00
2012-05-26	Win	(Russia) Dzhabar Askerov	Glory 1: Stockholm	Stockholm, Sweden	Decision (Unanimous)	3	3:00
70 kg Slam Tournament, First Round.
2012-02-26	Win	(Morocco) Rachid Belaini	Vuisten Van Vuur	's-Hertogenbosch, Netherlands	Decision (Unanimous)	3	3.00
2012-01-28	Win	(Turkey) Murat Direkçi	It's Showtime 2012 in Leeuwarden	Amsterdam, Netherlands	Decision (Majority)	3	3:00
2011-09-24	Win	(Ukraine) Artur Kyshenko	It's Showtime "Fast & Furious 70MAX"	Brussels, Belgium	KO (Left Hook)	1	2:20
Wins It's Showtime "Fast & Furious 70MAX" tournament title.
2011-09-24	Win	(Democratic Republic of the Congo) Chris Ngimbi	It's Showtime "Fast & Furious 70MAX"	Brussels, Belgium	Decision (Majority)	3	3:00
"Fast & Furious" 70MAX Tournament, Semi-Finals.
2011-09-24	Win	(Morocco) Chahid Oulad El Hadj	It's Showtime "Fast & Furious 70MAX"	Brussels, Belgium	TKO (Corner stoppage)	2	2:40
"Fast & Furious" 70MAX Tournament, Quarter-Finals.
2011-05-21	Loss	(Morocco) Mohamed Khamal	Fightclub presents: It's Showtime 2011	Amsterdam, Netherlands	Decision (Split)	3	3:00
2011-03-19	Win	(Georgia (country)) Davit Kiria	United Glory 13: 2010-2011 World Series Semifinals	Charleroi, Belgium	Decision (Unanimous)	3	3:00
2011-03-06	Win	(Morocco) Chahid Oulad El Hadj	Fightingstars presents: It's Showtime Sporthallen Zuid	Amsterdam, Netherlands	Decision (Majority)	3	3:00
2010-12-04	Win	(Albania) Mikel Colaj	Janus Fight Night 2010	Padua, Italy	Decision	3	3:00
2010-10-16	Win	(Estonia) Maxim Vorovski	United Glory 12: 2010-2011 World Series Quarterfinals	Amsterdam, Netherlands	Decision (Unanimous)	3	3:00
2010-09-12	Win	(Netherlands) William Diender	Fightingstars presents: It's Showtime 2010	Amsterdam, Netherlands	KO (Liver Punch)	3	
2010-06-11	Loss	(Netherlands) Ajay Balgobind	Friday Night Fight Night	Amsterdam, Netherlands	Ext. R. Decision	4	3:00
2010-03-21	Loss	(Morocco) Mohamed Khamal	K-1 World MAX 2010 West Europe Tournament, Semi Finals	Utrecht, Netherlands	KO		
2010-03-21	Win	(Netherlands) Henri van Opstal	K-1 World MAX 2010 West Europe Tournament, Quarter Finals	Utrecht, Netherlands	Ext. R. Decision	4	3:00
2010-02-27	Win	(Suriname) Anthony Nekrui	Amsterdam Fight Club	Amsterdam, Netherlands	Decision	3	3:00
2009-12-12	Win	(Morocco) Yassin Baitar		Netherlands	Ext. R. Decision (split)	3	3:00
2009-10-24	Win	(United States) Chad Bishop	This Is It!	Rhoon, Netherlands	TKO		
2009-09-27	Win	(Morocco) Ait Said Houkari	Knock Out Combat 6	Eindhoven, Netherlands	KO	5	
2009-06-13	Win	(Turkey) Achmed Zragua	Gentlemen Promotions	Tilburg, Netherlands	Decision (unanimous)	3	3:00
2009-03-20	Win	(Bosnia and Herzegovina) Bahrudin Mahmic	Night of Gladiators	Sarajevo, Bosnia and Herzegovina	KO (Low kicks)	1	
2008-12-17	Win	(Morocco) Amin Choukoud		Netherlands	Decision (split)	5	3:00
2008-08-01	Loss	(Morocco) Youssef Boughanem		Veghel, Netherlands			
2008-05-24	Loss	(Netherlands) Robert Siebenheller	Fight Sensation 3	Doetinchem, Netherlands	Decision	3	2:00
2008-05-24	Loss	(Netherlands) Samil Unal	Fight Sensation 3	Doetinchem, Netherlands	Decision	3	3:00
2008-05-10	Loss	(France) Antoine Pinto	Golden Belt	Liverpool, England	Decision	5	3:00
2008-04-26	Win	(Morocco) Hammadi el Mahdaoui	K-1 World GP 2008 Amsterdam, Super Fight	Amsterdam, Netherlands	Decision (Unanimous)	3	3:00
2008-02-17	Draw	(Netherlands) Leroy Kaestner	K-1 MAX Netherlands 2008 The Final Qualification, Opening fight	Utrecht, Netherlands	Decision draw	5	2:00
2008-01-20	Win	(Morocco) Faysal el Osrouti	Kickboksgala, Sportschool Jellema	Houten, Netherlands	Decision	5	2:00
2007-12-16	Win	(Iran) Arman Soufi		Netherlands	Decision (split)	5	2:00
2007-11-24	Loss	(Netherlands) Jan Pruijmboom	Shootboxing in the Autotron	Rosmalen, Netherlands	Decision	5	2:00
2007-09-23	Win	(Chechnya) Ruslan Mamedkhanov	Rings Holland: Risky Business, Vechtsebanen	Utrecht, Netherlands	KO (Right hook)	1	
2007-07-01	Loss	(Netherlands) Anthony Kane	Next Generation Warriors	Utrecht, Netherlands	Decision	5	2:00
2007-05-13	Loss	(Netherlands) Jan Pruijmboom	Fight Night Veghel	Veghel, Netherlands	Decision	5	2:00
2007-04-09	Win	(Netherlands) Robert Siebenheller		Netherlands	Decision	5	2:00
2007-03-18	Win	(Morocco) Soufiane Aouragh	Demolition Part II	Den Bosch, Netherlands	Decision (majority)	5	2:00
2007-02-17	Win	(Morocco) Faysal el Ousrouti	Valentijn's Event	Utrecht, Netherlands	Decision (Unanimous)	5	2:00
2007-01-22	Win	(Turkey) Yavuz Kayabasi	MT Lumpini & Siam Gym Gala	Weert, Netherlands	Decision (Unanimous)	3	2:00
2006-11-18	Win	(Turkey) Zeki Bouzreki	Muay thai gala Vlaardingen	Vlaardingen, Netherlands	TKO		
2006-10-01	Loss	(Netherlands) Edson Fortes	Thaiboks Gala, Schuttersveld	Rotterdam, Netherlands	Decision (Unanimous)	3	2:00
2006-09-10	Win	(Netherlands) Romano Morjoner	Thaiboks Gala Veghel	Veghel, Netherlands	TKO (Doctor stoppage)		
2006-06-25	Draw	(Netherlands) Harry Petalo	Thaibox Gala	Bergen op Zoom, Netherlands	Decision draw	3	2:00
2006-06-04	Win	(Morocco) Chafik Ayoub	Kickbox Gala Druten	Druten, Netherlands	Decision (split)	3	2:00
2006-05-07	Win	(Netherlands) Arwien Ramlal	Muay Thai gala Den Bosch	Den Bosch, Netherlands	Decision (Unanimous)	3	2:00
2006-04-15	Loss	(Suriname) Sergio Menig	Al-Fid Thaibox Gala	Eindhoven, Netherlands	Decision (Unanimous)	3	2:00
2006-03-11	Win	(Afghanistan) Massi Rahimi		Netherlands	Decision	3	2:00
2006-02-05	Win	(Armenia) Atty Gol	Muaythai Gala Fight and Survive	Den Bosch, Netherlands	Decision	3	2:00
2005-11-26	Loss	(Netherlands) Romano Morjoner	Muay Thai gala Hoogwoud	Hoogwoud, Netherlands	Decision	3	2:00
2005-10-09	Draw	(Netherlands) Jeffrey Ezinga	Muay Thai gala Den Bosch	Den Bosch, Netherlands	Decision	3	2:00
2005-01-23	Win	(Netherlands) Achmed		Netherlands	Decision (split)	3	1:00
2004-12-18	Win	(Netherlands) Sofiane S.S. Emmen	Muaythai Gala Akdeniz Gym	Deventer, Netherlands	TKO (Corner stoppage)	2	
2004-11-13	Win	(Azerbaijan) Gussen Amirov	Sportlife Thaiboxing Gala	Heerlen, Netherlands	Decision (split)	3	1:00
Legend: Win Loss Draw/No contest Notes

== See also ==
- List of K-1 events
- List of It's Showtime events
- List of male kickboxers
