= 2012 in Glory =

Kickboxing events

Information
- First date: May 26, 2012
- Last date: December 31, 2012

Events
- Total events: 4

Fights

Chronology
2012 in Glory	2013 in Glory

The year 2012 was the first year in the history of Glory, an international kickboxing event. 2012 starts with Glory 1: Stockholm, and ends with Dream 18 & Glory 4: Tokyo. The events were broadcast through television agreements with regional channels around the world.

== List of events ==
#	Event title	Date	Arena	Location
1	Glory 1: Stockholm	May 26, 2012	Ericsson Globe	Stockholm, Sweden
2	Glory 2: Brussels	October 6, 2012	Forest National	Brussels, Belgium
3	Glory 3: Rome	November 3, 2012	PalaLottomatica	Rome, Italy
4	Dream 18/Glory 4: Tokyo	December 31, 2012	Saitama Super Arena	Saitama, Japan

== Glory 1: Stockholm ==
Glory 1: Stockholm
- Promotion: Glory
- Date: May 26, 2012
- Venue: Ericsson Globe
- City: Stockholm, Sweden
- Attendance: 11,300

Event chronology
Glory 1: Stockholm	Glory 2: Brussels

Glory 1: Stockholm was a kickboxing event held on May 26, 2012, at the Ericsson Globe in Stockholm, Sweden.

=== Background ===
This event featured the world title fight for the inaugural Glory Heavyweight championship between Semmy Schilt and Errol Zimmerman as headliner. The event also featured qualification bouts for the Glory 70kg Slam Tournament.

=== Result ===
Glory 1
Weight class				Method	Round	Time	Notes
Heavyweight 120 kg	(Netherlands) Semmy Schilt	def.	(Curaçao) Errol Zimmerman	TKO (Corner Stoppage)	3	2:20	For the inaugural Glory Heavyweight Championship
Heavyweight 120 kg	(Turkey) Gokhan Saki	def.	(United States) Carter Williams	KO (Punch)	1	1:05	
Welterweight 77 kg	(Netherlands) Nieky Holzken	def.	(United States) Alex Harris	KO (Punch to the Body)	2	2:44	
Lightweight 70 kg	(Netherlands) Robin van Roosmalen	def.	(Russia) Dzhabar Askerov	Decision (Unanimous)	3	3:00	70 kg Slam Qualification
Lightweight 70 kg	(Georgia (country)) Davit Kiria	def.	(Thailand) Kem Sitsongpeenong	Decision (Unanimous)	3	3:00	70 kg Slam Qualification
Lightweight 70 kg	(United States) Ky Hollenbeck	def.	(United States) Michael Corley	TKO (Referee Stoppage)	1	0:46	70 kg Slam Qualification
Lightweight 70 kg	(Sweden) Sanny Dahlbeck	def.	(South Africa) Warren Stevelmans	Decision (Unanimous)	3	3:00	70 kg Slam Qualification
Lightweight 70 kg	(Netherlands) Albert Kraus	def.	(Denmark) Mohammed El Mir	Decision (Unanimous)	3	3:00	70 kg Slam Qualification
Lightweight 70 kg	(Italy) Giorgio Petrosyan	def.	(France) Fabio Pinca	Decision (Unanimous)	3	3:00	70 kg Slam Qualification
Lightweight 70 kg	(England) Tim Thomas	def.	(Germany) Dennis Schneidmiller	Decision (Unanimous)	3	3:00	70 kg Slam Qualification
Lightweight 70 kg	(Albania) Shemsi Beqiri	def.	(Japan) Yoshihiro Sato	Decision (Split)	3	3:00	70 kg Slam Qualification
MMA Light Heavyweight 93 kg	(Sweden) Ilir Latifi	def.	(United States) Tony Lopez	Decision (Unanimous)	3	5:00	
MMA Light Heavyweight 93 kg	(Netherlands) Jason Jones	def.	(Austria) Dritan Barjamaj	Submission (Armbar)	1	1:09	

== Glory 2: Brussels ==
Glory 2: Brussels
- Promotion: Glory
- Date: October 6, 2012
- Venue: Forest National
- City: Brussels, Belgium
- Attendance: 5,367

Event chronology
Glory 1: Stockholm	Glory 2: Brussels	Glory 3: Rome

Glory 2: Brussels was a kickboxing event held on October 6, 2012, at the Forest National in Brussels, Belgium.

=== Background ===
This event featured a super fight between Remy Bonjasky and Anderson Silva as headliner, Also this event featured non-tournament super fight series.

=== Result ===
Glory 2
Weight class				Method	Round	Time	Notes
Heavyweight 120 kg	(Netherlands) Remy Bonjasky	def.	(Brazil) Anderson Silva	Decision (Majority Ext. Round)	4	3:00	
Heavyweight 120 kg	(Turkey) Gokhan Saki	def.	(Tunisia) Mourad Bouzidi	Decision (Unanimous)	3	3:00	
Welterweight 77 kg	(Netherlands) Nieky Holzken	def.	(Albania) Murat Direkci	TKO (Cut)	2	2:49	
Heavyweight 120 kg	(Belgium) Filip Verlinden	def.	(Brazil) Fabiano Cyclone	Decision (Unanimous)	3	3:00	
Welterweight 77 kg	(Suriname) Murthel Groenhart	def.	(Belgium) Marc de Bonte	KO (Knee)	2	0:50	
Heavyweight 120 kg	(Croatia) Igor Jurkovic	def.	(France) Gregory Tony	TKO (3 Knockdowns/Liver Shot)	2	2:30	
Heavyweight 120 kg	(Japan) Koichi Pettas	def.	(United States) Mark Miller	KO (Punch)	2	0:41	
Heavyweight 120 kg	(Brazil) Jhonata Diniz	def.	(Belgium) Sebastian van Thielen	Decision (Unanimous)	3	3:00	
Heavyweight 120 kg	(Netherlands) Jahfarr Wilnis	def.	(Belgium) Jamal Ben Saddik	Decision (Unanimous)	3	3:00	
Lightweight 70 kg	(Armenia) Marat Grigorian	def.	(Germany) Alex Vogel	TKO (Low Kick)	2	2:45	
Light Heavyweight 95 kg	(Democratic Republic of the Congo) Danyo Ilunga	def.	(Turkey) Ali Cenik	Decision (Unanimous)	3	3:00	Welterweight 76 kg
Lightweight 70 kg	(Suriname) Andy Ristie	def.	(Morocco) Nordin Benmoh	KO (Punch)	1	2:31	
MMA Welterweight 70 kg	(Belgium) Tommy Depret	def.	(Japan) Yuya Shirai	TKO (punches)	3		
MMA Light Heavyweight 93 kg	(Netherlands) Jason Jones	def.	(Japan) Tatsuya Mizuno	Decision (Unanimous)	3	5:00	

== Glory 3: Rome ==
Glory 3: Rome
- Promotion: Glory
- Date: November 3, 2012
- Venue: PalaLottomatica
- City: Rome, Italy
- Attendance: 7,483

Event chronology
Glory 2: Brussels	Glory 3: Rome	Dream 18/Glory 4: Tokyo

Glory 3: Rome was a kickboxing event held on November 3, 2012, at the PalaLottomatica in Rome, Italy.

=== Background ===
This event featured the Glory 70kg Slam Tournament final 8 Quarter-finals, Semifinals and final. Albert Kraus withdrew from the tournament due to the flu and was replaced by Yoshihiro Sato.

=== Result ===
Glory 3
Weight class				Method	Round	Time	Notes
Lightweight 70 kg	(Italy) Giorgio Petrosyan	def.	(Netherlands) Robin van Roosmalen	Decision (Unanimous)	3	3:00	70 kg Slam Final
Lightweight 70 kg	(England) Jordan Watson	def.	(Morocco) Mustapha Haida	Decision (Unanimous)	3	3:00	
Lightweight 70 kg	(Netherlands) Robin van Roosmalen	def.	(Sweden) Sanny Dahlbeck	TKO (Punch to the Body)	3	0:46	70 kg Slam Semi-finals
Lightweight 70 kg	(Italy) Giorgio Petrosyan	def.	(Georgia (country)) Davit Kiria	Decision (Unanimous)	3	3:00	70 kg Slam Semi-finals
Lightweight 70 kg	(Belgium) Alka Matewa	def.	(Italy) Marco Re	Decision (Unanimous)	3	3:00	
Lightweight 70 kg	(Sweden) Sanny Dahlbeck	def.	(Japan) Yoshihiro Sato	TKO (Knee to the Body)	2	2:56	70 kg Slam Quarter-finals
Lightweight 70 kg	(Netherlands) Robin van Roosmalen	def.	(England) Tim Thomas	TKO (Ref Stoppage)	2	2:27	70 kg Slam Quarter-finals
Lightweight 70 kg	(Georgia (country)) Davit Kiria	def.	(Albania) Shemsi Beqiri	Decision (Unanimous)	3	3:00	70 kg Slam Quarter-finals
Lightweight 70 kg	(Italy) Giorgio Petrosyan	def.	(United States) Ky Hollenbeck	TKO (Injury)	2	0:30	70 kg Slam Quarter-finals
Lightweight 70 kg	(Italy) Alessandro Campagna	def.	(France) Fabio Pinca	Decision (Unanimous)	3	3:00	70 kg Slam Reserve Fight
Lightweight 70 kg	(South Africa) Warren Stevelmans	def.	(Russia) Dzhabar Askerov	Decision (Unanimous)	3	3:00	70 kg Slam Reserve Fight
MMA Lightweight 70 kg	(Brazil) Cesario di Domenico	def.	(Italy) David Dolce	Submission (Rear Naked Choke)	1	1:08	
MMA Lightweight 70 kg	(Switzerland) Ivan Musardo	def.	(Italy) Giorgio Belsanti	Submission (Rear Naked Choke)	1	3:00	

=== 70kg Slam Tournament bracket ===
First 16; Glory 1: Stockholm
(Italy) Giorgio Petrosyan	DEC
(France) Fabio Pinca	3-0
(United States) Ky Hollenbeck	TKO
(United States) Michael Corley	R1.
(Switzerland) Shemsi Beqiri	DEC
(Japan) Yoshihiro Sato	2-1
(Georgia (country)) Davit Kiria	DEC
(Thailand) Kem Sitsongpeenong	3-0
(Russia) Dzhabar Askerov	3-0
(Netherlands) Robin van Roosmalen	DEC
(United Kingdom) Tim Thomas	DEC
(Germany) Dennis Schneidmiller	3-0
(Netherlands) Albert Kraus	DEC
(Denmark) Mohammed El Mir	3-0
(Sweden) Sanny Dahlbeck	DEC
(South Africa) Warren Stevelmans	3-0

Quarter-finals; Glory 3: Rome
(Italy) Giorgio Petrosyan	TKO
(United States) Ky Hollenbeck	R2.
(Switzerland) Shemsi Beqiri	3-0
(Georgia (country)) Davit Kiria	DEC
(Netherlands) Robin van Roosmalen	TKO
(United Kingdom) Tim Thomas	R2.
(Japan) Yoshihiro Sato^{1}	R2.
(Sweden) Sanny Dahlbeck	TKO

Semi-finals; Glory 3: Rome
(Italy) Giorgio Petrosyan	DEC
(Georgia (country)) Davit Kiria	3-0
(Netherlands) Robin van Roosmalen	TKO
(Sweden) Sanny Dahlbeck	R3.

Final; Glory 3: Rome
(Italy) Giorgio Petrosyan	DEC
(Netherlands) Robin van Roosmalen	3-0

^{1} Albert Kraus withdrew from the tournament due to the flu and was replaced by Yoshihiro Sato.

== Dream 18/Glory 4: Tokyo ==
Dream 18/Glory 4: Tokyo
- Date: December 31, 2012
- City: Saitama, Japan
- Venue: Saitama Super Arena
- Attendance: 10,651

Dream event chronology
← Previous; Fight For Japan: Genki Desu Ka Omisoka 2011	Next → —

Glory event chronology
← Previous; Glory 3: Rome	Next → Glory 5: London

GLORY Sports International presents Dream 18 & Glory 4 Tokyo ~ Special 2012 ~ New Year's Eve was a mixed martial arts and kickboxing hybrid event held on December 31, 2012, at the Saitama Super Arena in Saitama, Japan.

=== Background ===
Dream partnered with Glory Sports International for this event.

The GLORY kickboxing event featured a one-night, single-elimination 16-man Glory Heavyweight Grand Slam Tournament. The winner brought home a $400,000 first-place prize and the runner-up a $100,000 second-place prize. Semmy Schilt, the number one seed, defeated Daniel Ghiță, the number three seed, in the first round via knockout to win the tournament.

=== Result ===
Glory 4
Weight class				Method	Round	Time	Notes
Heavyweight 120 kg	(Netherlands) Semmy Schilt	def.	(Romania) Daniel Ghiță	TKO (Head Kick)	1	2:54	Heavyweight Grand Slam Final
Lightweight 70 kg	(Netherlands) Robin van Roosmalen	def.	(Japan) Yuichiro Nagashima	Decision (Unanimous)	3	3:00	
Strawweight 53 kg	(Japan) Mutsuki Ebata	def.	(South Korea) Sang-Jae Kim	Decision (Unanimous)	3	3:00	
Heavyweight 120 kg	(Romania) Daniel Ghiță	def.	(Belgium) Jamal Ben Saddik	KO (Liver Kick)	1	0:25	Heavyweight Grand Slam Semi-finals
Heavyweight 120 kg	(Netherlands) Semmy Schilt	def.	(Turkey) Gökhan Saki	Decision (Unanimous)	2	3:00	Heavyweight Grand Slam Semi-finals
Middleweight 85 kg	(Netherlands) Jason Wilnis	def.	(Japan) Toshio Matsumoto	Decision (Unanimous)	3	3:00	
Heavyweight 120 kg	(Romania) Daniel Ghiță	def.	(Tunisia) Mourad Bouzidi	TKO (Arm Injury)	2	1:37	Heavyweight Grand Slam Quarter-finals
Heavyweight 120 kg	(Belgium) Jamal Ben Saddik	def.	(Suriname) Remy Bonjasky	Decision (Unanimous)	2	3:00	Heavyweight Grand Slam Quarter-finals
Heavyweight 120 kg	(Turkey) Gökhan Saki	def.	(Brazil) Anderson Silva	TKO (Left Hook)	1	3:00	Heavyweight Grand Slam Quarter-finals
Heavyweight 120 kg	(Netherlands) Semmy Schilt	def.	(Netherlands) Rico Verhoeven	Decision (Unanimous)	2	3:00	Heavyweight Grand Slam Quarter-finals
Heavyweight 120 kg	(Romania) Daniel Ghiță	def.	(Brazil) Jhonata Diniz	Ext.R Decision (Unanimous)	3	3:00	Heavyweight Grand Slam Opening Round
Heavyweight 120 kg	(Tunisia) Mourad Bouzidi	def.	(Netherlands) Peter Aerts	TKO (Hand Injury)	1	3:00	Heavyweight Grand Slam Opening Round
Heavyweight 120 kg	(Belgium) Jamal Ben Saddik	def.	(Curaçao) Errol Zimmerman	Decision (Unanimous)	2	3:00	Heavyweight Grand Slam Opening Round
Heavyweight 120 kg	(Suriname) Remy Bonjasky	def.	(Belgium) Filip Verlinden	Decision (Split Extra Round)	3	3:00	Heavyweight Grand Slam Opening Round
Heavyweight 120 kg	(Brazil) Anderson Silva	def.	(Croatia) Igor Jurković	TKO (2 Knockdowns)	1		Heavyweight Grand Slam Opening Round
Heavyweight 120 kg	(Turkey) Gökhan Saki	def.	(Japan) Raoumaru	TKO (2 Knockdowns)	1	2:06	Heavyweight Grand Slam Opening Round
Heavyweight 120 kg	(Netherlands) Rico Verhoeven	def.	(Russia) Sergei Kharitonov	Decision (Unanimous)	2	3:00	Heavyweight Grand Slam Opening Round
Heavyweight 120 kg	(Netherlands) Semmy Schilt	def.	(France) Brice Guidon	TKO (2 Knockdowns)	2	1:53	Heavyweight Grand Slam Opening Round
Heavyweight 120 kg	(France) Jérôme Le Banner	def.	(Japan) Koichi Pettas	KO (Punch)	3	2:48	
Dream 18
Featherweight 66 kg	(Japan) Tatsuya Kawajiri	def.	(Japan) Michihiro Omigawa	Decision (Unanimous)	3	5:00	
Featherweight 66 kg	(Armenia) Georgi Karakhanyan	def.	(Japan) Hiroyuki Takaya	Decision (Split)	3	5:00	
Lightweight 70 kg	(Japan) Shinya Aoki	def.	(United States) Antonio McKee	Submission (Punch)	2	0:24	
Bantamweight 61 kg	(Brazil) Bibiano Fernandes	def.	(Japan) Yoshiro Maeda	Submission (Triangle Choke)	1	1:46	
Middleweight 84 kg	(Suriname) Melvin Manhoef	def.	(Canada) Denis Kang	TKO (Knee to the body and Punches)	1	0:50	
Welterweight 77 kg	(Japan) Hayato Sakurai	def.	(United States) Phil Baroni	Decision (Unanimous)	3	5:00	
Women's Featherweight 66 kg	(Netherlands) Marloes Coenen	def.	(Australia) Fiona Muxlow	Submission (Armbar)	1	2:29	
Lightweight 70 kg	(United States) Will Brooks	def.	(Japan) Satoru Kitaoka	TKO (Punches)	2	3:46	

=== Glory Heavyweight Grand Slam Tournament bracket ===
First 16
(Netherlands) Semmy Schilt (1)	KO
(France) Brice Guidon	R2.
(Russia) Sergei Kharitonov (8)	3-0
(Netherlands) Rico Verhoeven	DEC
(Turkey) Gökhan Saki (2)	KO
(Japan) Raoumaru	R1.
(Brazil) Anderson Silva (7)	TKO
(Croatia) Igor Jurković	R1.
(Netherlands) Remy Bonjasky (4)	DEC
(Belgium) Filip Verlinden	2-1
(Curaçao) Errol Zimmerman (6)	3-0
(Morocco) Jamal Ben Saddik	DEC
(Netherlands) Peter Aerts (5)	R2.
(Tunisia) Mourad Bouzidi	TKO
(Romania) Daniel Ghiță (3)	DEC
(Brazil) Jhonata Diniz	3-0

Quarter-finals
(Netherlands) Semmy Schilt	DEC
(Netherlands) Rico Verhoeven	3-0
(Turkey) Gökhan Saki	TKO
(Brazil) Anderson Silva	R1.
(Netherlands) Remy Bonjasky	3-0
(Morocco) Jamal Ben Saddik	DEC
(Tunisia) Mourad Bouzidi	R2.
(Romania) Daniel Ghiță	TKO

Semi-finals
(Netherlands) Semmy Schilt	DEC
(Turkey) Gökhan Saki	3-0
(Morocco) Jamal Ben Saddik	R1.
(Romania) Daniel Ghiță	KO

Final
(Netherlands) Semmy Schilt	TKO
(Romania) Daniel Ghiță	R1.

== International broadcasting ==
Country	Broadcaster
Brazil	BandSports
Canada	Fight Network
Croatia	Fight Channel
Japan	TBS
Poland	Orange Sport
Romania	Sport.ro
Russia	Rossiya 2
United Kingdom	Premier Sports
United States	CBS Sports
