= 2013 in Glory =

Kickboxing events

Information
- First date: February 2, 2013
- Last date: December 21, 2013

Events
- Total events: 15

Fights

Chronology
2012 in Glory	2013 in Glory	2014 in Glory

The year 2013 was the second year in the history of Glory, an international kickboxing event. 2013 starts with 2013 Road to Glory USA 95 kg Tournament, and ends with Glory 13: Tokyo. The events were broadcast through television agreements with Spike TV and other regional channels around the world.

== List of events ==
#	Event title	Date	Arena	Location
1	Road to Glory USA 95 kg Tournament	February 2, 2013	Hard Rock Hotel and Casino	(United States) Tulsa, Oklahoma, US
2	Road to Glory USA 85 kg Tournament	February 9, 2013	Hollywood Park Casino	(United States) Los Angeles, California, US
3	Road to Glory Japan 65 kg Tournament	March 10, 2013	Differ Ariake Arena	Tokyo, Japan
4	Road to Glory USA 77 kg Tournament	March 22, 2013	Capitale	(United States) New York City, New York, US
5	Glory 5: London	March 23, 2013	ExCeL Arena	London, England
6	Glory 6: Istanbul	April 6, 2013	Ülker Arena	Istanbul, Turkey
7	Glory 7: Milan	April 20, 2013	Mediolanum Forum	Milan, Italy
8	Glory 8: Tokyo	May 3, 2013	Ariake Coliseum	Tokyo, Japan
9	2013 Road to Glory USA 70 kg Tournament	May 11, 2013	The Rave	(United States) Milwaukee, Wisconsin, US
10	2013 Road to Glory USA Heavyweight Tournament	June 14, 2013	Hard Rock Hotel and Casino	(United States) Tulsa, Oklahoma, US
11	Glory 9: New York	June 22, 2013	Hammerstein Ballroom	(United States) New York City, New York, US
12	Glory 10: Los Angeles	September 28, 2013	Citizens Business Bank Arena	(United States) Ontario, California, US
13	Glory 11: Chicago	October 12, 2013	Sears Centre	(United States) Hoffman Estates, Illinois, US
14	Glory 12: New York	November 23, 2013	The Theater at Madison Square Garden	(United States) New York City, New York, US
15	Glory 13: Tokyo	December 21, 2013	Ariake Coliseum	Tokyo, Japan

== Road to Glory USA 95 kg Tournament ==
Road to Glory USA 95 kg Tournament
- Promotion: Glory
- Date: February 2, 2013
- Venue: Hard Rock Hotel and Casino
- City: (United States) Tulsa, Oklahoma, US

Event chronology
Dream 18/Glory 4: Tokyo	Road to Glory USA 95 kg Tournament	Glory 6: Istanbul

Road to Glory USA 95 kg Tournament was a kickboxing event held on February 2, 2013 at the Hard Rock Hotel and Casino in Tulsa, Oklahoma, US.

=== Results ===
Glory 5
Weight Class				Method	Round	Time	Notes
Light Heavyweight 95 kg	(United States) Dustin Jacoby	def.	(United States) Brian Collette	KO (Punches)	1	3:00	Tournament Final
Light Heavyweight 95 kg	(United States) Brian Collette	def.	(United States) Kyle Martin	TKO (Punches)	1	1:29	Tournament Semi-finals
Light Heavyweight 95 kg	(United States) Dustin Jacoby	def.	(United States) Roy Boughton	TKO (Punches)	1	2:47	Tournament Semi-finals
Light Heavyweight 95 kg	(United States) Brian Collette	def.	(United States) Jeremy Freitag	KO (Head Kick)	2	0:14	Tournament Quarter-finals
Light Heavyweight 95 kg	(United States) Kyle Martin	def.	(United States) Myron Dennis	Decision (Split)	3	3:00	Tournament Quarter-finals
Light Heavyweight 95 kg	(United States) Dustin Jacoby	def.	(United States) Randy Blake	TKO (Punches)	3	1:43	Tournament Quarter-finals
Light Heavyweight 95 kg	(United States) Roy Boughton	def.	(United States) Daniel Brison	Decision (Unanimous)	3	3:00	Tournament Quarter-finals
Light Heavyweight 95 kg	(United States) John King	def.	(United States) Jason Bloom	Decision (Unanimous)	3	3:00	Tournament Reserve Fight

== Road to Glory USA 85 kg Tournament ==
Road to Glory USA 85 kg Tournament
- Promotion: Glory
- Date: February 9, 2013
- Venue: Hollywood Park Casino
- City: (United States) Los Angeles, California, US

Event chronology
Dream 18/Glory 4: Tokyo	Road to Glory USA 85 kg Tournament	Glory 6: Istanbul

Road to Glory USA 85 kg Tournament was a kickboxing event held on February 9, 2013 at the Hollywood Park Casino in Los Angeles, California, US.

=== Results ===
Glory 5
Weight Class				Method	Round	Time	Notes
Middleweight 85 kg	(United States) Mike Lemaire	def.	(United States) Eddie Walker	TKO (Leg Kicks)	3	2:26	Tournament Final
Middleweight 85 kg	(United States) Mike Lemaire	def.	(United States) Andrew Kapel	Decision (Split - Ext. Round)	4	3:00	Tournament Semi-finals
Middleweight 85 kg	(United States) Eddie Walker	def.	(South Africa) Van Wyk Povey	TKO (2 Knockdowns Rule)	2	2:13	Tournament Semi-finals
Middleweight 85 kg	(United States) Mike Lemaire	def.	(Russia) Evgeny Zotov	KO (Head Kick)	2	0:48	Tournament Quarter-finals
Middleweight 85 kg	(United States) Andrew Kapel	def.	(United States) Casey Greene	Decision (Split)	3	3:00	Tournament Quarter-finals
Middleweight 85 kg	(South Africa) Van Wyk Povey	def.	(Philippines) Jonarh Junio	TKO (2 Knockdowns Rule)	1	1:23	Tournament Quarter-finals
Middleweight 85 kg	(United States) Eddie Walker	def.	(Mexico) Edgar Del Fierro	KO (Knee and Punches)	2	1:26	Tournament Quarter-finals
Middleweight 85 kg	(Nigeria) Afam Egbochuku	def.	(United States) Jacob Poss	KO (Punch)	2	1:08	Tournament Reserve Fight

== Road to Glory Japan 65 kg Tournament ==
Road to Glory Japan 65 kg Tournament
- Promotion: Glory
- Date: March 10, 2013
- Venue: Differ Ariake Arena
- City: Tokyo, Japan

Event chronology
Dream 18/Glory 4: Tokyo	Road to Glory Japan 65 kg Tournament	Glory 6: Istanbul

Road to Glory Japan 65 kg Tournament was a kickboxing event held on March 10, 2013 at the Differ Ariake Arena in Tokyo, Japan.

=== Results ===
Glory 5
Weight Class				Method	Round	Time	Notes
Featherweight 65 kg	(Japan) Masaaki Noiri	def.	(Japan) Yuki	TKO (2 Knockdown Rule)	2	1:35	Tournament Final
Bantamweight 60 kg	(Japan) Hirotaka Urabe	def.	(Japan) Shigeru	TKO (Cut - Ext. Round)	4	0:28	
Lightweight 70 kg	(Japan) Yu Hirono	def.	(Japan) Ichiyo Morimoto	Decision (Unanimous)	3	3:00	
Featherweight 65 kg	(Japan) Masaaki Noiri	def.	(Japan) Yukihiro Komiya	Decision (Majority)	3	3:00	Tournament Semi-finals
Featherweight 65 kg	(Japan) Yuki	def.	(Japan) Zen Fujita	TKO (2 Knockdown Rule)	2	2:42	Tournament Semi-finals
Bantamweight 60 kg	(Japan) Tatsuya Inaishi	def.	(Japan) Junpei Aotsu	Decision (Split - Ext. Round)	4	3:00	
Featherweight 65 kg	(Japan) Yukihiro Komiya	def.	(Japan) Ryuji Kajiwara	Decision (Unanimous - Ext. Round)	4	3:00	Tournament Quarter-finals
Featherweight 65 kg	(Japan) Masaaki Noiri	def.	(Japan) Hiroya	Decision (Majority)	3	3:00	Tournament Quarter-finals
Featherweight 65 kg	(Japan) Yuki	def.	(Japan) Mohan Dragon	Decision (Unanimous)	3	5:00	Tournament Quarter-finals
Featherweight 65 kg	(Japan) Zen Fujita	def.	(Japan) Riki Matsuoka	TKO (2 Knockdowns Rule)	3	1:05	Tournament Quarter-finals
Featherweight 65 kg	(Japan) TaCa	def.	(Japan) Kazuki Hamasaki	KO (Punch)	2	0:15	Tournament Reserve Fight
Bantamweight 61 kg	(Japan) Koji	def.	(Japan) Tasuku	Decision (Unanimous)	3	5:00	
Bantamweight 60 kg	(Japan) Kazuki Koyano	def.	(Japan) Ippei Nagashima	KO (Punches)	1	1:18	

== Road to Glory USA 77 kg Tournament ==
Road to Glory USA 77 kg Tournament
- Promotion: Glory
- Date: March 22, 2013
- Venue: Capitale
- City: (United States) New York City, New York, US

Event chronology
Dream 18/Glory 4: Tokyo	Road to Glory USA 77 kg Tournament	Glory 6: Istanbul

Road to Glory USA 77 kg Tournament was a kickboxing event held on March 22, 2013 at the Capitale in New York City, New York, US.

== Glory 5: London ==
Glory 5: London
- Promotion: Glory
- Date: March 23, 2013
- Venue: ExCeL Arena
- City: London, England
- Attendance: 4,500

Event chronology
Dream 18/Glory 4: Tokyo	Glory 5: London	Glory 6: Istanbul

Glory 5: London was a kickboxing event held on March 23, 2013 at the ExCeL Arena in London, England.

=== Background ===
This event featured a super fight between Tyrone Spong and Remy Bonjasky as headliner; this event also featured non-tournament super fight series.

=== Results ===
Glory 5
Weight Class				Method	Round	Time	Notes
Heavyweight 120 kg	(Suriname) Tyrone Spong	def.	(Suriname) Remy Bonjasky	KO (Right Hook)	2	1:22	
Lightweight 70 kg	(England) Jordan Watson	def.	(Australia) Steve Moxon	Decision (Unanimous)	3	3:00	
Lightweight 70 kg	(Netherlands) Albert Kraus	def.	(South Africa) Warren Stevelmans	Decision (Unanimous)	3	3:00	
Middleweight 85 kg	(England) Steve Wakeling	def.	(United States) Eddie Walker	KO (Low Kicks)	2	1:38	
Light Heavyweight 95 kg	(Democratic Republic of the Congo) Danyo Ilunga	def.	(France) Stephane Susperregui	KO (Knee)	2	0:21	
Light Heavyweight 95 kg	(Netherlands) Michael Duut	def.	(United States) Dustin Jacoby	KO (3 Knockdowns)	1	2:15	
Featherweight 65 kg	(Morocco) Mosab Amrani	def.	(England) Liam Harrison	KO (Liver Shot)	1	1:13	
Heavyweight 120 kg	(England) Daniel Sam	def.	(India) Jaideep Singh	Decision (Unanimous)	3	3:00	
Lightweight 70 kg	(France) Johann Fauveau	def.	(Romania) Costel Pașniciuc	Decision (Unanimous)	3	3:00	
Featherweight 65 kg	(England) Reece McAllister	def.	(England) Tim Thomas	Decision (Unanimous)	3	3:00	
Welterweight 77 kg	(Brazil) Jonatan Oliveira	def.	(Italy) Nicola Gallo	Decision (Unanimous)	3	3:00	
Middleweight 85 kg	(England) Marlon Hunt	def.	(Estonia) Andrei Manzolo	Decision (Unanimous)	3	3:00	
Lightweight 70 kg	(England) Chad Sugden	def.	(England) Sam Wilson	Decision (Unanimous)	3	3:00	
Lightweight 70 kg	(England) Kerrith Bhella	def.	(England) Sam Omomogbe	Decision (Unanimous)	3	3:00	
Light Heavyweight 95 kg	(Slovakia) Boris Uhlik	def.	(England) Fraser Weightman	Decision (Unanimous)	3	3:00	

== Glory 6: Istanbul ==
Glory 6: Istanbul
- Promotion: Glory
- Date: April 6, 2013
- Venue: Ülker Arena
- City: Istanbul, Turkey
- Attendance: 12,000

Event chronology
Glory 5: London	Glory 6: Istanbul	Glory 7: Milan

Glory 6: Istanbul was a kickboxing event held on April 6, 2013 at the Ülker Arena in Istanbul, Turkey.

=== Background ===
This event featured a super fight between Gökhan Saki and Daniel Ghiță as headliner, this event also featured non-tournament super fight series.

=== Results ===
Glory 6
Weight Class				Method	Round	Time	Notes
Heavyweight 120 kg	(Turkey) Gökhan Saki	def.	(Romania) Daniel Ghiță	TKO (Punches)	2	2:42	
Heavyweight 120 kg	(Tunisia) Mourad Bouzidi	def.	(Brazil) Fabiano Cyclone	TKO (Injury)	2	3:00	
Light Heavyweight 95 kg	(Belgium) Filip Verlinden	def.	(Romania) Lucian Danilencu	Decision (Unanimous)	3	3:00	
Middleweight 85 kg	(Belgium) Marc de Bonte	def.	(Morocco) L'houcine Ouzgni	KO (Knee)	1	1:15	
Welterweight 77 kg	(Netherlands) Nieky Holzken	def.	(France) Karim Ghajji	TKO (cut)	4	2:12	
Lightweight 70 kg	(Suriname) Andy Ristie	def.	(Italy) Allessandro Campagna	Decision (Unanimous)	3	3:00	
Catchweight 75 kg	(Canada) Joseph Valtellini	def.	(Belgium) Murat Direkci	TKO (Corner Stoppage)	3	0:27	
Lightweight 70 kg	(Germany) Max Baumert	def.	(Turkey) Ismail Uzuner	KO (Head Kick)	1	2:26	
Featherweight 65 kg	(South Korea) Dong Su Kim	def.	(Japan) Naoki Yasuda	Decision (Unanimous)	3	3:00	
MMA Middleweight 84 kg	(Russia) Vitaly Bigdash	def.	(Turkey) Ertan Balaban	Submission (Kneebar)	1	3:36	
Heavyweight 120 kg	(Netherlands) Jahfarr Wilnis	def.	(Turkey) Oguz Ovguer	TKO	3		
Light Heavyweight 95 kg	(Turkey) Orhan Karalioglu	def.	(Brazil) Cleber Argente Alves	KO (Punch to the Body)	3		
Middleweight 85 kg	(Turkey) Samet Keser	def.	(Turkey) Muzaffer Gemici	KO (Punches)	1		
Featherweight 66 kg	(Turkey) Kenan Gunaydin	def.	(Turkey) Zurab Khistani	KO (Spinning Back Kick)	1		
Lightweight 70 kg	(Iran) Masoud Minaei	def.	(Turkey) Burak Ugur	TKO	2		

== Glory 7: Milan ==
Glory 7: Milan
- Promotion: Glory
- Date: April 20, 2013
- Venue: Mediolanum Forum
- City: Milan, Italy
- Attendance: 10,000

Event chronology
Glory 6: Istanbul	Glory 7: Milan	Glory 8: Tokyo

Glory 7: Milan was a kickboxing event held on April 20, 2013 at the Mediolanum Forum in Milan, Italy. This event featured non-tournament super fight series.

=== Background ===
This event featured a super fight between Giorgio Petrosyan and Hafid El Boustati as headliner. In co-main event, Murthel Groenhart had to battle with fellow superstar Robin van Roosmalen, this event also featured non-tournament super fight series.

=== Results ===
Glory 6
Weight Class				Method	Round	Time	Notes
Lightweight 70 kg	(Italy) Giorgio Petrosyan	def.	(Morocco) Hafid El Boustati	Decision (Unanimous)	3	3:00	
Lightweight 70 kg	(Netherlands) Robin van Roosmalen	def.	(Suriname) Murthel Groenhart	Decision (Unanimous)	3	3:00	
Lightweight 70 kg	(Georgia (country)) Davit Kiria	def.	(Belarus) Yuri Bessmertny	Decision (Unanimous)	3	3:00	
Heavyweight 120 kg	(Netherlands) Rico Verhoeven	def.	(Brazil) Jhonata Diniz	Decision (Unanimous)	3	3:00	
Middleweight 84 kg	(Russia) Artem Levin	def.	(Armenia) Sahak Parparyan	Decision (Extra Round)	4	3:00	
Lightweight 70 kg	(Belarus) Chingiz Allazov	vs.	(Armenia) Marat Grigorian	No Contest (Accidental Elbow)	1	2:47	
Featherweight 65 kg	(Thailand) Kaoponglek Luksuratham	def.	(Suriname) Sergio Wielzen	Decision (Unanimous)	3	3:00	
Light Heavyweight 95 kg	(Netherlands) Michael Duut	def.	(Australia) Steve McKinnon	Decision (Unanimous)	3	3:00	
Welterweight 77 kg	(Armenia) Karapet Karapetyan	def.	(Italy) Roberto Cocco	Decision (Unanimous)	3	3:00	

== Glory 8: Tokyo ==
Glory 8: Tokyo
- Promotion: Glory
- Date: May 3, 2013
- Venue: Ariake Coliseum
- City: Tokyo, Japan
- Attendance: 8,997

Event chronology
Glory 7: Milan	Glory 8: Tokyo	Glory 9: New York

Glory 8: Tokyo was a kickboxing event held on May 3, 2013 at the Ariake Coliseum in Tokyo, Japan. This event featured a Glory 65kg Slam Tournament.

=== Results ===
Glory 6
Weight Class				Method	Round	Time	Notes
Featherweight 65 kg	(Japan) Yuta Kubo	def.	(Japan) Masaaki Noiri	Decision (Unanimous)	3	3:00	65kg Slam Tournament Final
Heavyweight 120 kg	(Netherlands) Peter Aerts	def.	(Belgium) Jamal Ben Saddik	TKO (3 Knockdowns	2	2:27	
Lightweight 70 kg	(Suriname) Andy Ristie	def.	(Netherlands) Albert Kraus	KO (Knee)	2	0:27	
Featherweight 65 kg	(Japan) Yuta Kubo	def.	(Canada) Gabriel Varga	Decision (Unanimous)	3	3:00	65kg Slam Tournament Semi-finals
Featherweight 65 kg	(Japan) Masaaki Noiri	def.	(Armenia) Mosab Amrani	Decision (Unanimous)	3	3:00	65kg Slam Tournament Semi-finals
Heavyweight 120 kg	(France) Jerome Le Banner	def.	(Japan) Koichi Watanabe	Decision (Unanimous)	3	3:00	
Lightweight 70 kg	(Japan) Yoshihiro Sato	def.	(South Korea) Hwan Jin Lee	Decision (Unanimous)	3	3:00	
Featherweight 65 kg	(Japan) Yuta Kubo	def.	(South Korea) Chi Bin Lim	KO (Knee to Body)	2	2:58	65kg Slam Tournament Quarter-finals
Featherweight 65 kg	(Canada) Gabriel Varga	def.	(France) Abdellah Ezbiri	Decision (Unanimous)	3	3:00	65kg Slam Tournament Quarter-finals
Featherweight 65 kg	(Japan) Masaaki Noiri	def.	(England) Liam Harrison	TKO (Cut)	2	1:06	65kg Slam Tournament Quarter-finals
Featherweight 65 kg	(Morocco) Mosab Amrani	def.	(Brazil) Marcus Vinicius	Decision (Unanimous)	3	3:00	65kg Slam Tournament Quarter-finals
Featherweight 65 kg	(Thailand) Chonlek Super Pro Samui	def.	(Japan) Zen Fujita	Decision (Unanimous)	3	3:00	65kg Slam Tournament Reserve Fight
Featherweight 65 kg	(Russia) Andrej Bruhl	def.	(Japan) Yukihiro Komiya	Decision (Unanimous)	3	3:00	65kg Slam Tournament Reserve Fight

=== Glory 65kg Slam Tournament bracket ===
Quarter-finals
(Morocco) Mosab Amrani	DEC
(Brazil) Marcus Vinicius	3-0
(United Kingdom) Liam Harrison	R2.
(Japan) Masaaki Noiri	TKO
(France) Abdellah Ezbiri	3-0
(Canada) Gabriel Varga	DEC
(Japan) Yuta Kubo	KO
(South Korea) Chi Bin Lim	R2.

Semi-finals
(Morocco) Mosab Amrani	3-0
(Japan) Masaaki Noiri	DEC
(Canada) Gabriel Varga	3-0
(Japan) Yuta Kubo	DEC

Final
(Japan) Masaaki Noiri	3-0
(Japan) Yuta Kubo	DEC

== Glory 9: New York ==
Glory 9: New York
- Promotion: Glory
- Date: June 22, 2013
- Venue: Hammerstein Ballroom
- City: (United States) New York City, New York, USA
- Attendance: 1,555

Event chronology
Glory 8: Tokyo	Glory 9: New York	Glory 10: Los Angeles

Glory 9: New York was a kickboxing event held on June 22, 2013 at the Hammerstein Ballroom in New York City, New York. This event featured a Glory 95kg Slam Tournament.

=== Results ===
- Final : Tyrone Spong def. Danyo Ilunga via KO at 0:16 of Round 1
- Super Fight : Rico Verhoeven def. Errol Zimmerman via majority decision
- Super Fight : Wayne Barrett def. Mike Lemaire via KO at 1:12 of Round 2
- Semi-final : Tyrone Spong def. Filip Verlinden via unanimous decision
- Semi-final : Danyo Ilunga def. Dustin Jacoby via unanimous decision
- Super Fight : Daniel Ghiță def. Brice Guidon via KO at 0:49 of Round 1
- Super Fight : Joseph Valtellini def. Francois Ambang via TKO at 1:04 of Round 3
- Quarter-final : Tyrone Spong def. Michael Duut via KO at 0:31 of Round 1
- Quarter-final : Filip Verlinden def. Steve McKinnon via majority decision
- Quarter-final : Dustin Jacoby def. Brian Collette via split decision
- Quarter-final : Danyo Ilunga def. Mourad Bouzidi via unanimous decision
- Super Fight : Anderson Silva def. Daniel Sam via unanimous decision
- Reserve Fight : Randy Blake def. Koichi Watanabe via unanimous decision
- Reserve Fight : Artem Vakhitov def. Luis Tavares via KO at 1:06 of Round 1

=== Glory 95kg Slam Tournament bracket ===
Quarter-finals
(Germany) Danyo Ilunga	DEC
(Tunisia) Mourad Bouzidi	3-0
(United States) Brian Collette	2-1
(United States) Dustin Jacoby	DEC
(Belgium) Filip Verlinden	DEC
(Australia) Steve McKinnon	2-0
(Suriname) Tyrone Spong	KO
(Netherlands) Michael Duut	R1.

Semi-finals
(Germany) Danyo Ilunga	DEC
(United States) Dustin Jacoby	3-0
(Belgium) Filip Verlinden	3-0
(Suriname) Tyrone Spong	DEC

Final
(Germany) Danyo Ilunga	R1.
(Suriname) Tyrone Spong	KO

== Glory 10: Los Angeles ==
Glory 10: Los Angeles
- Promotion: Glory
- Date: September 28, 2013
- Venue: Citizens Business Bank Arena
- City: (United States) Ontario, California
- Attendance: 5,002

Event chronology
Glory 9: New York	Glory 10: Los Angeles	Glory 11: Chicago

Glory 10: Los Angeles was a kickboxing event held on September 28, 2013 at the Citizens Business Bank Arena in Ontario, California.

=== Background ===
The highlight of the event featured a Glory Middleweight World Championship Tournament. Two tournament matches were held, with a third match as reserve. The winners of the two semi-final bouts, proceeded to the finals for the championship main-event. The event also featured eight other non-tournament bouts.

=== Results ===
Main Card
Weight Class				Method	Round	Time	Notes
Middleweight	(United States) Joe Schilling	def.	(Russia) Artem Levin	Unanimous decision	4(ext.R)	3:00	Middleweight Championship Tournament Final
Lightweight	(Netherlands) Robin van Roosmalen	def.	(Albania) Shemsi Beqiri	Unanimous decision	3	3:00
Lightweight	(Georgia (country)) Davit Kiria	def.	(Netherlands) Murthel Groenhart	Unanimous decision	3	3:00
Middleweight	(United States) Wayne Barrett	def.	(United States) Robby Plotkin	TKO	3	2:26	Middleweight Championship Tournament Reserve Bout
Middleweight	(United States) Joe Schilling	def.	(Japan) Kengo Shimizu	Unanimous decision	3	3:00	Middleweight Championship Tournament Semi-final
Middleweight	(Russia) Artem Levin	def.	(Netherlands) Jason Wilnis	Unanimous decision	3	3:00	Middleweight Championship Tournament Semi-final
Superfight Series
Welterweight	(Armenia) Karapet Karapetyan	def.	(Russia) Alexander Stetsurenko	Unanimous decision	3	3:00
Heavyweight	(Netherlands) Jahfarr Wilnis	def.	(France) Brice Guidon	TKO	2	0:38
Lightweight	(Suriname) Andy Ristie	def.	(Denmark) Niclas Larsen	Unanimous decision	3	3:00
Light Heavyweight	(United States) Brian Collette	def.	(United States) Randy Blake	Unanimous decision	3	3:00
Lightweight	(United States) Ky Hollenbeck	def.	(Netherlands) Albert Kraus	Unanimous decision	3	3:00
Lightweight	(Japan) Hinata	def.	(France) Johann Fauveau	TKO	3	0:48

=== 2013 Glory Middleweight World Championship Tournament bracket ===
Semi-finals
(Russia) Artem Levin	DEC
(Netherlands) Jason Wilnis	3-0
(United States) Joe Schilling	DEC
(Japan) Kengo Shimizu	3-0

Final
(Russia) Artem Levin	3-0^{1}
(United States) Joe Schilling	DEC

^{1} Extra round decision.

== Glory 11: Chicago ==
Glory 11: Chicago
- Promotion: Glory
- Date: October 12, 2013
- Venue: Sears Centre
- City: (United States) Hoffman Estates, Illinois
- Attendance: 8,311

Event chronology
Glory 10: Los Angeles	Glory 11: Chicago	Glory 12: New York

Glory 11: Chicago was a kickboxing event held on October 12, 2013 at the Sears Centre at Hoffman Estates, Illinois.

=== Background ===
The highlight of the event featured a Glory Heavyweight World Championship Tournament. Two tournament matches were held, with a third match as reserve. The winners of the two semi-final bouts, proceeded to the finals for the championship main-event. The event also featured other non-tournament bouts.

It was Glory's first event broadcast on Spike, had average of 381,000 and peak of 782,000 viewers.

=== Results ===
Main Card (Spike)
Weight Class				Method	Round	Time	Notes
Heavyweight	(Netherlands) Rico Verhoeven	def.	(Romania) Daniel Ghiță	Unanimous decision	3	3:00	Heavyweight Championship Tournament Final
Light Heavyweight	(Suriname) Tyrone Spong	def.	(Australia) Nathan Corbett	TKO	2	1:10
Welterweight	(Canada) Joseph Valtellini	def.	(France) Karim Ghajji	TKO	3	2:53
Heavyweight	(Curaçao) Errol Zimmerman	def.	(Netherlands) Hesdy Gerges	TKO	3	0:38	Heavyweight Championship Tournament Reserve Bout
Heavyweight	(Netherlands) Rico Verhoeven	def.	(Turkey) Gokhan Saki	Majority decision	3	3:00	Heavyweight Championship Tournament Semi-final
Heavyweight	(Romania) Daniel Ghita	def.	(Brazil) Anderson Silva	TKO	1	1:56	Heavyweight Championship Tournament Semi-final
Superfight Series
Heavyweight	(Russia) Sergei Kharitonov	def.	(United Kingdom) Daniel Sam	Unanimous decision	3	3:00
Light Heavyweight	(Germany) Danyo Ilunga	def.	(Netherlands) Michael Duut	TKO	1	2:23
Welterweight	(United States) Raymond Daniels	def.	(United States) Brian Foster	TKO	1	2:24
Light Heavyweight	(Brazil) Saulo Cavalari	def.	(Belgium) Filip Verlinden	Unanimous decision	3	3:00
Lightweight	(Australia) Steve Moxon	def.	(United Kingdom) Reece McAllister	KO	3	0:28
Featherweight	(Canada) Gabriel Varga	def.	(Nicaragua) Jose Palacios	Unanimous decision	3	3:00

=== 2013 Glory Heavyweight World Championship Tournament bracket ===
Semi-finals
(Romania) Daniel Ghiță	TKO
(Brazil) Anderson Silva	R1.
(Netherlands) Rico Verhoeven	DEC
(Turkey) Gokhan Saki	2-0

Final
(Romania) Daniel Ghiță	3-0
(Netherlands) Rico Verhoeven	DEC

== Glory 12: New York ==
Glory 12: New York
- Promotion: Glory
- Date: November 23, 2013
- Venue: The Theater at Madison Square Garden
- City: (United States) New York City, New York
- Attendance: 4,124

Event chronology
Glory 11: Chicago	Glory 12: New York	Glory 13: Tokyo

Glory 12: New York was a kickboxing event held on November 23, 2013 at The Theater at Madison Square Garden at New York City, New York.

=== Background ===
The highlight of the event featured a Glory Lightweight World Championship Tournament. Two tournament matches were held, with a third match as reserve. The winners of the two semi-final bouts, proceeded to the finals for the championship main-event. The event also featured other non-tournament bouts.

It had average of 476,000 and peak of 665,000 viewers on Spike TV.

=== Results ===
Main Card (Spike)
Weight Class				Method	Round	Time	Notes
Lightweight	(Suriname) Andy Ristie	def.	(Netherlands) Robin van Roosmalen	KO	2	1:44	Lightweight Championship Tournament Final
Middleweight	(United States) Wayne Barrett	def.	(United States) Joe Schilling	Unanimous decision	3	3:00
Heavyweight	(Australia) Ben Edwards	def.	(Morocco) Jamal Ben Saddik	KO	3	2:52
Lightweight	(United States) Ky Hollenbeck	def.	(South Africa) Warren Stevelmans	Unanimous decision	3	3:00	Lightweight Championship Tournament Reserve Bout
Lightweight	(Suriname) Andy Ristie	def.	(Italy) Giorgio Petrosyan	KO	3	0:43	Lightweight Championship Tournament Semi-final
Lightweight	(Netherlands) Robin van Roosmalen	def.	(Georgia (country)) Davit Kiria	Unanimous decision	3	3:00	Lightweight Championship Tournament Semi-final
Superfight Series
Heavyweight	(Russia) Artem Vakhitov	def.	(Serbia) Nenad Pagonis	Unanimous decision	3	3:00
Heavyweight	(United States) Brian Collette	def.	(United States) Warren Thompson	KO	1	1:03
Heavyweight	(Brazil) Jhonata Diniz	def.	(Croatia) Igor Jurković	KO	1
Welterweight	(United States) Francois Ambang	def.	(United States) Eddie Walker	KO	3	1:40
Light Heavyweight	(Brazil) Saulo Cavalari	def.	(Tunisia) Mourad Bouzidi	KO	1	1:23
Welterweight	(Brazil) Thiago Michel Silva	def.	(Argentina) Paul Marfort	Unanimous decision	3	3:00
Undercard
Heavyweight	Casey Greene	def.	John King	KO	1	2:59
Lightweight	John Bowman	def.	Villi Bello	KO	3	2:50

=== 2013 Glory Lightweight World Championship Tournament bracket ===
Semi-finals
(Netherlands) Robin van Roosmalen	DEC
(Georgia (country)) Davit Kiria	3-0
(Italy) Giorgio Petrosyan	R3.
(Suriname) Andy Ristie	KO

Final
(Netherlands) Robin van Roosmalen	R2.
(Suriname) Andy Ristie	KO

== Glory 13: Tokyo ==
Glory 13: Tokyo
- Promotion: Glory
- Date: December 21, 2013
- Venue: (Japan) Ariake Coliseum
- City: Tokyo, Japan
- Attendance: 7,897

Event chronology
Glory 12: New York	Glory 13: Tokyo	Glory 14: Zagreb

Glory 13: Tokyo was a kickboxing event held on December 21, 2013 at the Ariake Coliseum in Tokyo, Japan.

=== Background ===
The highlight of the event was a Glory Welterweight World Championship Tournament. Two tournament matches were held, with a third match as reserve. The winners of the two semi-final bouts proceeded to the finals for the championship main-event. The event also featured other non-tournament bouts, including the retirement match of the legendary Peter Aerts, against Rico Verhoeven, and Daniel Ghiță vs. Errol Zimmerman II.

Glory 13 had average of 659,000 and peak of 905,000 viewers on Spike TV.

=== Results ===
Main Card (Spike)
Weight Class				Method	Round	Time	Notes
Heavyweight	(Netherlands) Rico Verhoeven	def.	(Netherlands) Peter Aerts	Decision (split)	3	3:00
Welterweight	(Netherlands) Nieky Holzken	def.	(Canada) Joseph Valtellini	KO (right hook)	3	2:44	Welterweight Championship Tournament Final
Heavyweight	(Romania) Daniel Ghiță	def.	(Curaçao) Errol Zimmerman	KO (left hook)	1	0:35
90kg Catchweight	(Japan) Makoto Uehara	def.	(United States) Dustin Jacoby	Decision (split)	3	3:00
Welterweight	(Canada) Joseph Valtellini	def.	(United States) Raymond Daniels	KO (high kick)	3	1:20	Welterweight Championship Tournament Semi-final
Welterweight	(Netherlands) Nieky Holzken	def.	(Armenia) Karapet Karapetyan	Decision (unanimous)	3	3:00	Welterweight Championship Tournament Semi-final
Superfight Series
Featherweight	(Morocco) Mosab Amrani	def.	(Japan) Yuta Kubo	Decision (unanimous)	3	3:00
Welterweight	(Ukraine) Artur Kyshenko	def.	(Japan) Masayuki Kenmun	Decision (unanimous)	3	3:00
Welterweight	(Russia) Alexander Stetsurenko	def.	(France) Karim Ghajji	Decision (unanimous)	3	3:00	Welterweight Championship Tournament Reserve Bout
Heavyweight	(Brazil) Anderson Silva	def.	(Netherlands) Remy Bonjasky	Decision (unanimous)	3	3:00
Heavyweight	(Netherlands) Hesdy Gerges	def.	(Brazil) Ewerton Teixeira	Decision (unanimous)	3	3:00
Heavyweight	(Russia) Sergey Kharitonov	def.	(France) Jerome Le Banner	Decision (unanimous)	3	3:00

=== 2013 Glory Welterweight World Championship Tournament bracket ===
Semi-finals
(Netherlands) Nieky Holzken	DEC
(Armenia) Karapet Karapetyan	3-0
(Canada) Joseph Valtellini	KO
(United States) Raymond Daniels	R3.

Final
(Netherlands) Nieky Holzken	KO
(Canada) Joseph Valtellini	R3.
