= Davit Kiria =

Georgian kickboxer

- Born: February 9, 1988 (age 38); Zugdidi, Georgian SSR, Soviet Union
- Native name: დავით ქირია
- Nationality: Georgian
- Height: 1.70 m (5 ft 7 in)
- Weight: 70.3 kg (155 lb; 11.07 st)
- Division: Lightweight
- Reach: 70 in (180 cm)
- Style: Ashihara karate, kickboxing
- Stance: Orthodox
- Fighting out of: Georgia
- Team: Golden Glory (2007–present)
- Trainer: Sjef Weber, Nieky Holzken, Bachuki Partsvania
- Rank: Black belt in Ashihara karate
- Years active: 2006–present

Kickboxing record
- Total: 65
- Wins: 41
- By knockout: 18
- Losses: 23
- By knockout: 4
- Draws: 1
- Last updated on: March 8, 2014

Davit Kiria (Georgian: დავით ქირია) (born February 9, 1988), also spelled as David Kyria, is a Georgian kickboxer who competes in the Featherweight and Lightweight divisions.

Also an Ashihara karate stylist, Kiria is a former Glory Lightweight Champion and Kunlun Fight 70kg World Max Tournament Champion.

Combat Press ranked him as the #5 lightweight kickboxer in the world in August 2021, peaking as high as #1 in September 2014.

== Background ==
Born in Zugdidi, Georgia, Kiria started learning Ashihara karate aged nine in the Ashihara International Karate Organization (AIKO). He later relocated to the Netherlands to train under AIKO founder Dave Jonkers at the Golden Glory gym in Zuidlaren, where he is a training partner of legendary heavyweight Sem Schilt. He began kickboxing at fifteen years old after a career in full contact karate, in which he won the 2009 Kyokushinkai Karate Kamakura European Championship of the International Budo Kai organization.

== Career ==
In 2008, he reached the final of the Ring Masters Olympia 2008 Welterweight Tournament in Istanbul, Turkey but lost to the great Somrak Kamsing by decision after three rounds. Following this, Kiria moved up to middleweight and continued to gain experience by fighting his way through the Dutch kickboxing scene. On April 17, 2010, he competed in the Superfighters 8 Man Tournament in Frankfurt, Germany. Despite losing to Marco Piqué by an extension round decision in the quarter-finals, he was still given a slot in the semis by replacing Shemsi Beqiri who coundn't continue due to a broken nose. He was then eliminated from the competition by losing a decision to Chris van Venpoep.

After tough losses against some of the sport's most experienced fighters, Kiria finally got the break-out win of his career when he defeated the K-1 and It's Showtime veteran William Diender by decision after five rounds in Assen, Netherlands.

He was then pitted against the up-and-coming Robin van Roosmalen at United Glory 13: 2010-2011 World Series Semifinals in Charleroi, Belgium on March 19, 2011, losing via unanimous decision in a "Fight of the Night" display.

Kiria then moved up to the 74 kg/163 lb weight class from his usual 70 kg/154 lb to take on one of the world's top fighters in Nieky Holzken at United Glory 15 in Moscow, Russia on March 23, 2012. He lost by unanimous decision.

Despite having gone 0–2 in the Glory promotion, he was included in the 2012 Middleweight Slam tournament, replacing Cosmo Alexandre to join sixteen of the world's best fighters at 70 kg/154 lb. The tournament kicked off in Stockholm, Sweden at Glory 1: Stockholm - 2012 Middleweight Slam First 16 on May 26, 2012, and Kiria caused a major upset by taking a unanimous decision win over Muay Thai stylist Kem Sitsongpeenong. Kem seemed uncomfortable without the use of elbows and clinching and was outboxed throughout the duration of the match. Kiria also floored the Thai star with a mawashi geri in the opening round to ensure the points victory.

Advancing to the tournament final eight at Glory 3: Rome - 2012 Middleweight Slam Final 8 in Rome, Italy on November 3, 2012, Kiria was drawn against Shemsi Beqiri at the quarter-finals. After an action-packed three rounds, Kiria was given the nod via split decision and headed into the semis to face eventual tournament winner Giorgio Petrosyan, who won by a unanimous points verdict. Despite coming back from the Glory tournament empty-handed, Kiria proved himself to be amongst the middleweight elite, and moved into the top ten in the world rankings in December 2012, coming in at #7.

He showcased exceptionable boxing skills and an impenetrable defence en route to a unanimous decision victory over Yuri Bessmertny at Glory 7: Milan in Milan, Italy on April 20, 2013.

Kiria took a unanimous decision over Murthel Groenhart at Glory 10: Los Angeles - Middleweight World Championship Tournament in Ontario, California, United States on September 28, 2013.

He rematched Robin van Roosmalen in the semi-finals of the Glory 12: New York - Lightweight World Championship Tournament in New York City, New York, US on November 23, 2013, losing a unanimous decision.

=== Glory Lightweight Championship ===
Replacing Ky Hollenbeck who withdrew from the fight, Kiria faced Andy Ristie for the inaugural Glory Lightweight Championship at Glory 14: Zagreb in Zagreb, Croatia on March 8, 2014. He trailed to his Surinamese opponent for the first three rounds and was knocked down with a step knee in the second, but mounted a late comeback in the championship rounds and finished Ristie in the fifth to take the belt.

He was scheduled to fight Robin van Roosmalen for the Glory Lightweight title. Van Roosmalen won the fight by majority decision.

He fought a rematch with Jonay Risco during Enfusion 66. Kiria lost a unanimous decision.

Kiria won his next two fights. He beat Anatoly Moiseev by decision and Nordin Ben Moh by KO.

=== Kunlun Fight 70kg World Max Tournament Champion ===
He participated in the 2019 Kunlun Fight World Max Tournament. He beat Feng Xingli by TKO in the semifinals, and beat Marouan Toutouh by split decision in the finals.

=== ONE Championship ===
On May 18, 2020, it was reported that Kiria had signed with ONE Championship. He is set to make his promotional debut against 2019 ONE Featherweight Kickboxing World Grand Prix Champion Giorgio Petrosyan at ONE Championship: Fists Of Fury on February 26, 2021. Kiria lost the fight by unanimous decision.

Kiria faced Enriko Kehl in the quarter-finals of the 2021 ONE Kickboxing Featherweight World Grand Prix at ONE Championship: First Strike. Kiria won by first-round technical knockout. Kiria was booked to face Sitthichai Sitsongpeenong in the semifinals of the ONE Featherweight Kickboxing World Grand Prix at ONE: Only the Brave on January 28, 2022. Kiria lost by unanimous decision.

Kiria faced Mohammed Boutasaa at ONE 157 on May 20, 2022. He lost the fight by unanimous decision.

Kiria faced Mickael Pignolo for the vacant NDC -72 kg championship at Nuit Des Champions 29 on November 19, 2022. He captured the vacant title by a second-round knockout.

Kiria faced Johannes Baas at Mix Fight Championship on December 3, 2022. He won the fight by unanimous decision.

Kiria faced the ONE Muay Thai Featherweight World Champion Tawanchai P.K. Saenchaimuaythaigym in a kickboxing bout at ONE Fight Night 13 on August 5, 2023. He lost the bout in the third round due to his right arm being broken whilst attempting to block a left body kick from Tawanchai.

Kiria faced Ouyang Feng at Wu Lin Feng 2024: 12th Global Kung Fu Festival on January 27, 2024. He lost the fight by a second-round technical knockout.

On February 8, 2024, it was announced that Kiria would be one of sixteen participants of the K-1 World MAX 2024 - World Tournament Opening Round where he would face Thananchai Sitsongpeenong on March 20, 2024. Kiria later withdrew from the tournament, as he was unable to secure a visa.

== Personal life ==
Kiria has two daughters. He is an Orthodox Christian.

== Championships and awards ==
=== Karate ===
- International Budo Kai
  - 2009 Kyokushinkai Karate Kamakura European Champion

=== Kickboxing ===
- Nuit Des Champions
  - 2022 Nuit Des Champions -72 kg Championship
- Glory
  - Glory Lightweight (-70 kg/154 lb) Championship (one time; first)
- Kunlun Fight
  - 2018 Kunlun Fight World Max Tournament Champion
- Mixed Fighting Network
  - MFN Champion

=== Savate ===
- Kungfu World Cup Champion
  - 2017 KFWC Savate Pro -70 kg Champion

== Kickboxing record ==
Kickboxing record
41 wins (18 KOs), 23 losses, 1 draw
Date	Result	Opponent	Event	Location	Method	Round	Time
2024-12-07	Win	(Portugal) Lucas Carlos Da Silva	IFC 20	Tbilisi, Georgia	Decision (unanimous)	3	3:00
2024-10-13	Loss	(Japan) Kaito	SHOOT BOXING 2024 act.5	Tokyo, Japan	Decision (unanimous)	3	3:00
2024-06-29	Win	(Ukraine) Taras Hnatchuk	Oktagon Tsunami Edition	Rome, Italy	Decision (unanimous)	3	3:00
2024-01-27	Loss	(China) Ouyang Feng	Wu Lin Feng 2024: 12th Global Kung Fu Festival	Tangshan, China	TKO (low kicks)	3	0:23
2023-08-05	Loss	(Thailand) Tawanchai P.K. Saenchaimuaythaigym	ONE Fight Night 13	Bangkok, Thailand	TKO (broken arm/middle kick)	3	0:30
2022-12-03	Win	(Germany) Johannes Baas	Mix Fight Championship	Frankfurt, Germany	Decision (unanimous)	3	3:00
2022-11-19	Win	(France) Mickael Pignolo	Nuit Des Champions 29	Marseille, France	TKO (referee stoppage/punch)	2	
Won the vacant NDC -72 kg title
2022-05-20	Loss	(Morocco) Mohammed Boutasaa	ONE 157	Kallang, Singapore	Decision (unanimous)	3	3:00
2022-01-28	Loss	(Thailand) Sitthichai Sitsongpeenong	ONE: Only the Brave	Kallang, Singapore	Decision (unanimous)	3	3:00
Kickboxing Featherweight Grand Prix Semi-finals
2021-10-15	Win	(Germany) Enriko Kehl	ONE Championship: First Strike	Kallang, Singapore	TKO (3 knockdown/punches)	1	2:50
Kickboxing Featherweight Grand Prix Quarter Final
2021-02-26	Loss	(Italy) Giorgio Petrosyan	ONE Championship: Fists Of Fury	Kallang, Singapore	Decision (unanimous)	3	3:00
2019-02-24	Win	(Morocco) Marouan Toutouh	Kunlun Fight 80, Final	Shanghai, China	Decision (split)	3	3:00
Wins the Kunlun Fight 70kg World Max Tournament Champion.
2019-02-24	Win	(China) Feng Xingli	Kunlun Fight 80, Semi Finals	Shanghai, China	TKO (left front kick to the body)	3	1:13
2018-10-13	Win	(Morocco) Nordin Ben Moh	Kunlun Fight 77: Hollow Throne, Quarter Finals	Tongling, China	KO (left hook)	3	2:56
2018-08-05	Win	(Russia) Anatoly Moiseev	Kunlun Fight 75	Sanya, China	Decision (unanimous)	3	3:00
2018-05-05	Loss	(Spain) Jonay Risco	Enfusion Live 66	Tenerife, Spain	Decision (unanimous)	5	3:00
2017-11-24	Win	(France) Ludovic Nassibou	2017 Kungfu World Cup -70 kg Final	Paris, France	Decision (unanimous)	3	3:00
Wins the -70kg KFWC savate pro 2017.
2017-11-24	Win	(Ukraine) Sergey Kulyaba	2017 Kungfu World Cup -70 kg Semi-Finals	Paris, France	Decision (unanimous)	3	3:00
2017-11-12	Loss	(Thailand) Superbon Banchamek	Kunlun Fight 67 - World MAX 2017 Final 8	Sanya, China	Decision (majority)	3	3:00
2017-08-27	Win	(Morocco) Marouan Toutouh	kunlun Fight 65 – 70 kg World Max 2017 Tournament 1/8 Finals	Qingdao, China	Decision (unanimous)	3	3:00
2017-06-24	Loss	(Morocco) Marouan Toutouh	Kunlun Fight 63	Sanya, China	Ext. R decision (majority)	4	3:00
2017-03-11	Win	(Romania) Cristian Milea	Kunlun Fight 58/ Magnum Fc 1, 70kg Qualifier Tournament 3 Final B	Rome, Italy	TKO (low kicks)	1	
2017-03-11	Win	(Spain) Jonay Risco	Kunlun Fight 58/ Magnum Fc 1, 70kg Qualifier Tournament 3 Semi-Final B	Rome, Italy	Decision (unanimous)	3	3:00
2017-01-01	Loss	(Thailand) Jomthong Chuwattana	Kunlun Fight 56 - World MAX 2016, Semi Finals	Sanya, China	Ext. R decision	4	3:00
2016-10-30	Win	(Morocco) Mohamed Mezouari	Kunlun Fight 54 - World MAX 2016 Final 8	Wuhan, China	Forfeit	1	0:00
2016-09-11	Win	(Belarus) Dzianis Zuev	Kunlun Fight 52 - World MAX 2016 Final 16	Fuzhou, China	Decision (unanimous)	3	3:00
2016-07-31	Win	(Netherlands) Robbie Hageman	Kunlun Fight 48 - World MAX 2016 Reserve Fight	Jining, China	Decision (unanimous)	3	3:00
2016-04-08	Loss	(Turkey) Tayfun Özcan	Kunlun Fight 41 - World MAX 2016 Group G Tournament Semi Finals	Xining, China	Decision (unanimous)	3	3:00
2016-03-12	Loss	(Thailand) Sitthichai Sitsongpeenong	Glory 28: Paris - Lightweight Contender Tournament, Semi Finals	Paris, France,	Decision (unanimous)	3	3:00
2015-12-19	Loss	(Ukraine) Enriko Gogokhia	Kunlun Fight 35 - World MAX 2015 Final 8	Luoyang, China	Decision	3	3:00
2015-10-28	Win	(Spain) David Calvo	Kunlun Fight 32 - World MAX 2015 Final 16	China	TKO (3 knockdowns)	2	3:00
Qualified to Kunlun Fight 2015 70kg World MAX Tournament Final 8.
2015-06-05	Loss	(Thailand) Sitthichai Sitsongpeenong	Glory 22: Lille - Lightweight Contender Tournament, Semi Finals	Lille, France,	KO (knee to the body)	2	2:09
2015-02-01	Win	(China) Zheng Zhaoyu	Kunlun Fight 18	Guangzhou, China	KO (right hook)	1	
2014-11-07	Loss	(Netherlands) Robin van Roosmalen	Glory 18: Oklahoma	Oklahoma City, Oklahoma, USA	Decision (majority)	5	3:00
Loses the Glory Lightweight Championship.
2014-03-08	Win	(Suriname) Andy Ristie	Glory 14: Zagreb	Zagreb, Croatia	KO (punches)	5	2:22
Wins the Glory Lightweight Championship.
2013-11-23	Loss	(Netherlands) Robin van Roosmalen	Glory 12: New York - Lightweight World Championship Tournament, Semi Finals	New York City, New York, USA	Decision (unanimous)	3	3:00
2013-09-28	Win	(Suriname) Murthel Groenhart	Glory 10: Los Angeles	Ontario, California, USA	Decision (unanimous)	3	3:00
2013-04-20	Win	(Belarus) Yuri Bessmertny	Glory 7: Milan	Milan, Italy	Decision (unanimous)	3	3:00
2012-11-03	Loss	(Armenia) Giorgio Petrosyan	Glory 3: Rome - 70 kg Slam Tournament, Semi Finals	Rome, Italy	Decision (unanimous)	3	3:00
2012-11-03	Win	(Albania) Shemsi Beqiri	Glory 3: Rome - 70 kg Slam Tournament, Quarter Finals	Rome, Italy	Decision (split)	3	3:00
2012-05-26	Win	(Thailand) Kem Sitsongpeenong	Glory 1: Stockholm - 70 kg Slam Tournament, First Round	Stockholm, Sweden	Decision (unanimous)	3	3:00
2012-03-23	Loss	(Netherlands) Nieky Holzken	United Glory 15	Moscow, Russia	Decision (unanimous)	3	3:00
2011-11-12	Win	(Netherlands) Marvin Sansaar	Glorious Heroes Part II	Assen, Netherlands	TKO (punches)	1	
2011-08-19	Win	(Georgia (country)) David Javakhia	Zughdidi	Georgia	Points		
2011-03-19	Loss	(Netherlands) Robin van Roosmalen	United Glory 13: 2010-2011 World Series Semifinals	Charleroi, Belgium	Decision (unanimous)	3	3:00
2010-11-13	Win	(Germany) Ulli Schick	Glorious Heroes Part I	Assen, Netherlands	Decision	3	3:00
2010-10-09	Win	(Netherlands) William Diender	Ring Rage Part V	Assen, Netherlands	Decision	5	3:00
2010-04-17	Win	(Netherlands) Chris van Venrooij	Superfighters 8 Man Tournament, Semi Finals	Frankfurt, Germany	Decision	3	3:00
2010-04-17	Loss	(Suriname) Marco Piqué	Superfighters 8 Man Tournament, Quarter Finals	Frankfurt, Germany	Extension round decision	4	3:00
2009-06-20	Loss	(Netherlands) Milo El Geubli	Fight 058	Leeuwarden, Netherlands	Decision	3	3:00
2008-11-01	Loss	(Thailand) Somrak Kamsing	Ring Masters Olympia 2008, Welterweight Tournament Final	Istanbul, Turkey	Decision	3	3:00
For the Ring Masters Olympia 2008 Welterweight Tournament title.
2008-11-01	Win	(Turkey) Aydin Tuncay	Ring Masters Olympia 2008, Welterweight Tournament Semi Finals	Istanbul, Turkey	Decision	3	3:00
2008-07-06	Loss	(Netherlands) Faldir Chahbari	Ultimate Glory 8	Nijmegen, Netherlands	TKO (doc stop/cut)	2	
2008-03-23	Loss	(Germany) Ardalan Scheikholeslamie	Eastside Rumble	Twello, Netherlands	Decision	3	3:00
2007-11-17	Win	(Netherlands) Marvin Sansaar	Battle Under the Tower 2007	Steenwijk, Netherlands			
2007-06-11	Draw	(Thailand) Sornsuk	Beatdown 6	Amsterdam, Netherlands	Decision	3	3:00
Legend: Win Loss Draw/no contest Notes

== See also ==
- List of male kickboxers
