= Punching power =

Amount of kinetic energy in a punch

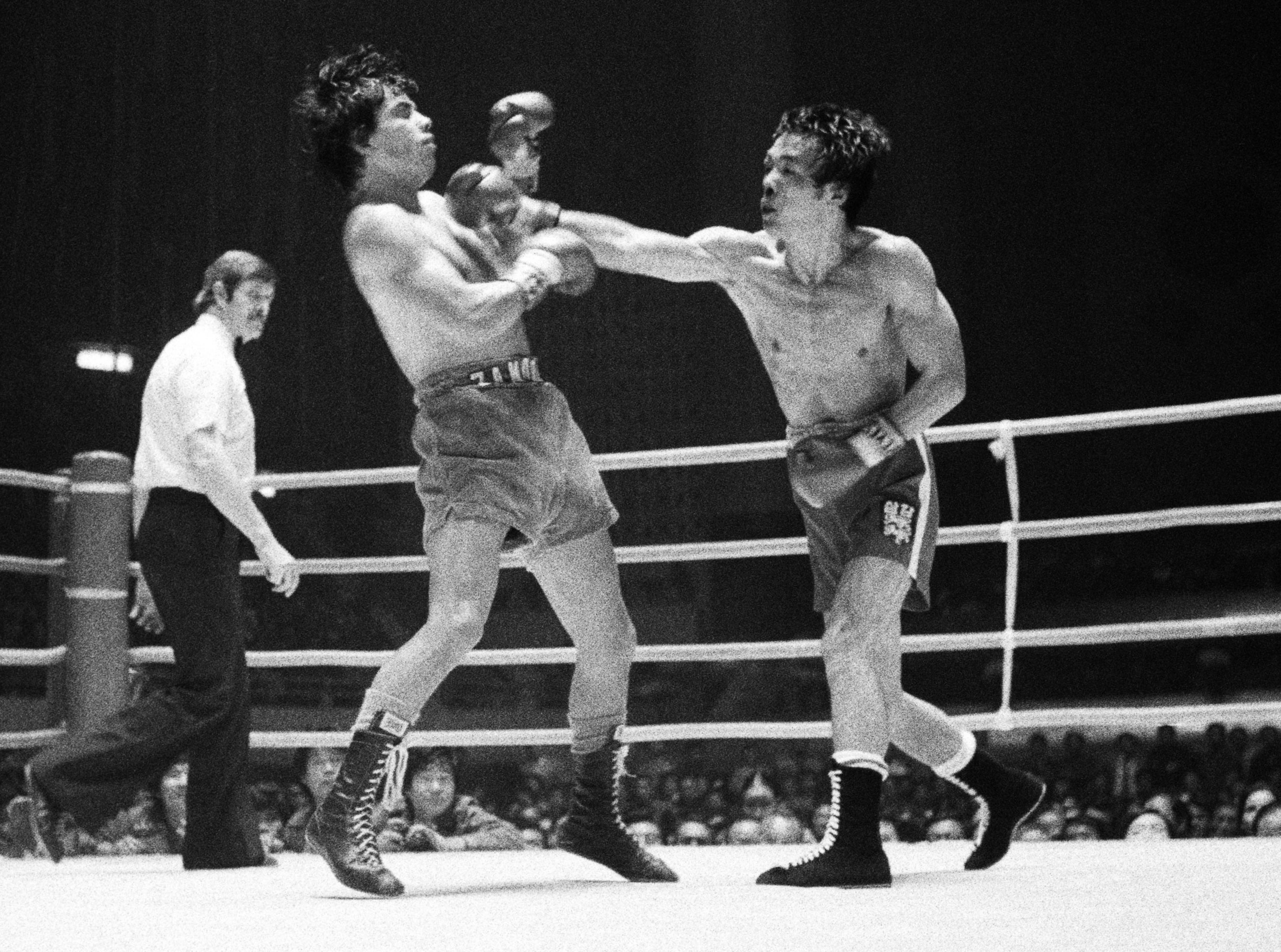
Strikes to the head can result in a knockout

Punching power is the amount of kinetic energy in a person's punches. Knockout power is a similar concept relating to the probability of any strike to the head to cause unconsciousness or a strike to the body that renders an opponent unable to continue fighting. Knockout power is related to, among other factors: the force delivered, the timing, the technique, and the precision of the strike.

In order to increase the mass behind a punch, it is essential to move the body as a unit throughout the punch. Power is generated from the ground up, such that force from the ankles transfers to the knees; force from the knees transfers to the thighs; force from the thighs transfers to the core; from the core to the chest; from the chest to the shoulders; from the shoulders to the forearms and finally the compounded force transfers through the fist into an opponent. So the most powerful punchers are able to connect their whole body and channel the force from each portion of the body into a punch.

Generally, there are five components to punching power that must be present for a puncher to be considered truly powerful: lack of arm punching, proper weight shifting, stepping during a punch, pivoting with a punch, and using proper footwork.

This body connection requires the development of a strong core. The core is perhaps the most important element in a powerful punch, since it connects the powerhouse of the legs to the delivery system of the arms.

While the core may be important, experienced boxers have greater contributions from the legs compared to less experienced boxers meaning strong powerful legs are the foundation for punching power.

When it comes to throwing a powerful jab, one must take a lead step forward to allow the body's momentum to carry forward with a braced lead arm to transmit this momentum to the target.

== See also ==
- Boxing
- Boxing styles and technique
- Chin (combat sports)
- Kickboxing
- Knockout
- Mixed Martial Arts
- Muay Thai
- Punch (combat)
- King hit (slang)
- Fa jin/Kinetic Linking
