= Alex Tobiasson Harris =

Swedish martial artist

Alex Tobiasson Harris is a Swedish Muay Thai kickboxer training at Fighter Muay Thai in Gothenburg, Sweden. He is the current WMC World Super Middleweight champion.

== Biography ==
A technical Thai boxer with a leaning towards flamboyance, Harris won the Swedish national Muay Thai championships in 2008, 2010 and 2012. Late 2011 saw him earn one of his biggest wins when he fought the K-1 MAX standout Yoshihiro Sato and took a unanimous decision win.

On April 28, 2012, he challenged Aiello Batonon from France for the WMC World Super Middleweight title. After 5 rounds Harris had all judges on his side. Harris is the fifth Sweden ever to conquer a WMC World title. He successfully defended his title on the 16 November 2012 knocking out Pidsanu 'Madsua' Kinchat from Thailand. He defended it for a second time with a unanimous decision win against Frenchman Yohan Lidon in Monte Carlo, Monaco on June 14, 2014.

== Kickboxing record ==
Professional kickboxing record
29 wins, 5 losses, 0 draws
Date	Result	Opponent	Event	Location	Method	Round	Time
2014-06-14	Win	(France) Yohan Lidon	Monte Carlo Fighting Masters 2014	Monte Carlo, Monaco	Decision (unanimous)	5	3:00
Retains WMC World Super Middleweight title.
2012-11-16	Win	(Thailand) Madsua	Rumble of the Kings 2012	Linköping, Sweden	KO (knee)	3	
Retains WMC World Super Middleweight title.
2012-05-26	Loss	(Netherlands) Nieky Holzken	Glory 1: Stockholm	Stockholm, Sweden	TKO (3 knockdowns/liver shots)	2	2:42
2012-04-28	Win	(France) Aiello Batonon		Brest, France	Decision (unanimous)	5	3:00
Wins WMC World Super Middleweight title.
2011-11-27	Win	(Japan) Yoshihiro Sato			Decision (unanimous)	3	3:00
Legend: Win Loss Draw/no contest Notes
