= Alim Nabiev =

Azerbaijani kickboxer (born 1994)

- Born: October 10, 1994 (age 32); Telavi, Georgia
- Nationality: Azerbaijani
- Height: 186 cm (6 ft 1 in)
- Weight: 77 kg (170 lb; 12.1 st)
- Division: Welterweight
- Style: Kickboxing, Muay Thai
- Stance: Orthodox
- Fighting out of: Baku, Azerbaijan
- Team: Superpro Sportcenter; Vityaz Fight
- Trainer: Dennis Krauweel; Ruslan Krivusha
- Years active: 2010 - present

Kickboxing record
- Total: 64
- Wins: 55
- By knockout: 21
- Losses: 9

Mixed martial arts record
- Total: 4
- Wins: 3
- By knockout: 2
- By decision: 1
- Losses: 1
- By decision: 1

Alim Nabiev (born October 10, 1994) is an Azerbaijani kickboxer and mixed martial artist. He is the former WMC World Light Heavyweight champion and Glory welterweight title challenger.

He is ranked as the third best welterweight in the world by Combat Press as of September 2022, and the best by Beyond Kickboxing as of October 2022. He was ranked in the welterweight top ten by Combat Press between November 2017 and July 2021, peaking as high as #2.

== Martial arts career ==
Nabiev made his professional debut against Vladislav Savotchenko in October 2010. He lost the fight by an extra round decision. He would go on to amass a 6–3 record, before taking part in the 2012 Grand Prix Russia welterweight tournament. He knocked out Valentin Ribalko in the first round in the semifinal bout, and won a decision against Denis Larchenko in the final.

After winning four of his next five fights, with the sole loss being to Chingiz Allazov, Nabiev participated in the W5 Fighter Bratislava XX welterweight tournament. He beat Tevfik Sucu by decision in the semifinal, and Vladimir Konsky by decision in the finals.

After defeating William Diender and Adem Bozkurt, he took part in the 2013 Legend Fighting Show tournament. Despite winning the semifinal fight against Vyacheslav Borshev by decision, he would be knocked out by Dzhabar Askerov in the finals. Five months later, he also participated in the Grand Prix Russia Open tournament. He won the first two fights against Janne Ollonen and Sergey Kulyaba by decision, and the final fight against Deo Phetsangkhat by a second-round knockout.

Following his tournament win, Nabiev defeated Armen Petrosyan and Chad Sugden, before losing a decision to Masoud Rahimi. He went on to win eight fights in a row, culminating in a decision victory against Islam Murtazaev, which qualified him for the Kunlun Fight 75 kg tournament. He lost the quarterfinal fight against Diogo Calado by unanimous decision.

In October 2016, Nabiev challenged Vladimír Moravčík for the W5 European Muay thai 77 kg title. He beat Moravčík by unanimous decision. At Nuit des Champions 2016, Nabiev fought Yohan Lidon for the WMC World Light Heavyweight championship, and won the fight by unanimous decision.

=== Glory ===
He signed with Glory in the second part of 2017, and faced Jimmy Vienot at Glory 47: Lyon for his promotional debut. He won the fight by unanimous decision. He next faced Nieky Holzken at Glory 49: Rotterdam, and won by unanimous decision. After winning a split decision against Cedric Doumbe, he was given the chance to fight Harut Grigorian for the Glory Welterweight championship at Glory 54: Birmingham. Grigorian won by unanimous decision.

Nabiev fought Eyevan Danenberg at Glory 59: Amsterdam and won by split decision. He won another split decision against Murthel Groenhart at Glory 64: Strasbourg, and challenged Cedric Doumbe for the Glory Welterweight title at Glory 66: Paris. Doumbe won by a second-round knockout.

Nabiev was scheduled to face Troy Jones at Glory: Collision 3 on October 23, 2021. He won the fight by unanimous decision.

Nabiev faced Endy Semeleer for the vacant Glory Welterweight Championship at Glory 82 on November 19, 2022. He lost the fight by split decision.

== Titles and accomplishments ==
=== Muay Thai ===
- World version W5
  - 2016 W5 European Muay Thai -77 kg Champion
- World Muaythai Council
  - 2016 WMC World Light Heavyweight (-79 kg) Champion
- International Federation of Muaythai Associations
  - 2013 IFMA European Championship -71 kg (silver)

=== Kickboxing ===
- World version W5
  - 2013 W5 -71 kg Tournament Champion
- Grand Prix Russia Open
  - 2013 GPRO -70 kg Tournament Champion
  - 2012 GPRO Tournament Champion
- Legend Fighting Show
  - 2013 Legend -71 kg Tournament runner up

== Mixed martial arts record ==
Professional record breakdown
5 matches	4 wins	1 loss
By knockout	3	0
By submission	0	0
By decision	1	1

Res.	Record	Opponent	Method	Event	Date	Round	Time	Location	Notes
Loss	4–1	David Mora	Decision (majority)	Rkena FC x PFL	October 17, 2026	3	5:00	Tbilisi, Georgia	Nabiev was deducted one point in round 1 due to grabbing the fence.
Win	4–0	Mike Mathetha	KO (punches)	Vault Fighting League 1	September 12, 2026	1	1:03	Dubai, United Arab Emirates	
Win	3–0	Jaime Sousa	Decision (unanimous)	Georgian FC 36	February 14, 2026	3	5:00	Batumi, Georgia	
Win	2–0	Oguzhan Atak	TKO (punches)	Georgian FC 33	October 25, 2025	1	1:30	Batumi, Georgia	
Win	1–0	Vahid Mohammad Nezhad	KO (punch)	New Generation Fighting 5	September 13, 2025	1	1:54	Nardaran, Azerbaijan	Welterweight debut.

== Kickboxing and Muay Thai record ==
Professional kickboxing record
55 wins (21 (T)KOs), 9 Losses, draws, 0 no contests
Date	Result	Opponent	Event	Location	Method	Round	Time
2024-09-14	Win	(Uganda) Umar Semata	Grand Bellagio Championship	Batumi, Georgia	Decision (unanimous)	3	3:00
2024-06-29	Win	(Greece) Konstantinos Makedoniadis	Fight For Honor 12	Brussels, Belgium	KO (knee to the head)	1	2:55
2022-11-19	Loss	(Curaçao) Endy Semeleer	Glory 82	Bonn, Germany	Decision (split)	5	3:00
For the vacant Glory Welterweight Championship.
2022-09-10	Win	(Romania) Andrei Ostrovanu	Mix Fight Championship	Baku, Azerbaijan	Decision (unanimous)	3	3:00
2021-10-23	Win	(United States) Troy Jones	Glory: Collision 3	Arnhem, Netherlands	Decision (unanimous)	3	3:00
2019-06-22	Loss	(France) Cedric Doumbe	Glory 66: Paris	Paris, France	KO (punches)	2	2:48
For the Glory Welterweight Championship.
2019-03-09	Win	(Netherlands) Murthel Groenhart	Glory 64: Strasbourg	Strasbourg, France	Decision (split)	3	3:00
2018-09-29	Win	(Aruba) Eyevan Danenberg	Glory 59: Amsterdam	Amsterdam, Netherlands	Decision (split)	3	3:00
2018-06-02	Loss	(Armenia) Harut Grigorian	Glory 54: Birmingham	Birmingham, England	Decision (unanimous)	5	3:00
For the Glory Welterweight Championship.
2018-03-03	Win	(France) Cedric Doumbe	Glory 51: Rotterdam	Rotterdam, Netherlands	Decision (split)	3	3:00
2017-12-09	Win	(Netherlands) Nieky Holzken	Glory 49: Rotterdam	Rotterdam, Netherlands	Decision (unanimous)	3	3:00
2017-10-28	Win	(France) Jimmy Vienot	Glory 47: Lyon	Lyon, France	Decision (split)	3	3:00
2017-06-24	Win	(China) Zhang Yang	Kunlun Fight 63	Sanya, China	Decision (unanimous)	3	3:00
2016-11-19	Win	(France) Yohan Lidon	Nuit des Champions 2016	Marseille, France	Decision (unanimous)	5	3:00
Wins the WMC World Light Heavyweight -79 kg Championship.
2016-10-08	Win	(Slovakia) Vladimír Moravčík	W5 Grand Prix "Legends in Prague"	Prague, Czech Republic	Decision (unanimous)	5	3:00
Wins the W5 European Muay Thai Championship -77 kg .
2016-07-10	Loss	(Portugal) Diogo Calado	Kunlun Fight 47, 75 kg Tournament Quarter-Finals 3	Nanjing, China	Decision (unanimous)	3	3:00
2016-04-08	Win	(Russia) Islam Murtazaev	Kunlun Fight 41, 75 kg Tournament Final 16	Xining, China	Decision (unanimous)	3	3:00
2016-02-27	Win	(United Kingdom) Jamie Bates	ACB KB 5	Orel, Russia	Decision (unanimous)	3	3:00
2015-11-13	Win	(Netherlands) Masoud Rahimi	ACB KB 4: Grand Prix Final	Perm, Russia	Decision	3	3:00
2015-10-10	Win	(France) Patrick Madis	Golden BARS Championship 2015	Belgorod, Russia	Decision	5	3:00
2015-08-15	Win	(Belarus) Pavel Turuk	Battle in Sochi/Kunlun Fight 29	Sochi, Russia	TKO (cut)	2	
2015-07-01	Win	(China) Li Baoming	T-One	Beijing, China			
2015-06-18	Win	(Poland) Pawel Biszczak	Grand Prix Russia Open 17	Russia	Decision (unanimous)	3	3:00
2015-02-26	Win	(Kyrgyzstan) Kumar Zhaliev	Grand Prix Russia Open 16	Moscow, Russia	TKO	3	
2014-12-19	Win	(Russia) Jamal Yusupov	Tvoy Vykhod	Lyubertsy, Russia	Decision	3	3:00
2014-12-07	Loss	(Netherlands) Masoud Rahimi	Tatneft Cup 2015 – 1st selection 1/8 final	Kazan, Russia	Decision (unanimous)	3	3:00
2014-04-05	Win	(Italy) Armen Petrosyan	Legend 3: Pour Homme	Milan, Italy	Decision (unanimous)	3	3:00
2014-02-23	Win	(United Kingdom) Chad Sugden	K-1 World max Final 4	Baku, Azerbaijan	Decision (split)	3	3:00
2013-11-16	Win	(Italy) Armen Petrosyan	W5 Grand Prix Orel XXII	Oryol, Russia	Decision (unanimous)	3	3:00
2013-10-03	Win	(Thailand) Deo Phetsangkhat	Grand Prix Russia Open, Final	Russia	KO	2	
Wins The 2013 Grand Prix Russia Open -70 kg Tournament Title.
2013-10-03	Win	(Ukraine) Sergey Kulyaba	Grand Prix Russia Open, Semi Finals	Russia	Decision (unanimous)	3	3:00
2012-10-03	Win	(Finland) Janne Ollonen	Grand Prix Russia Open, Quarter Finals	Russia	Decision (unanimous)	3	3:00
2013-05-25	Loss	(Russia) Dzhabar Askerov	Legend Fighting Show, Final	Moscow, Russia	KO (left low kick)	3	1:32
For the Legend Fighting Show -71kg tournament title.
2013-05-25	Win	(Russia) Vyacheslav Borshev	Legend Fighting Show, Semi Finals	Moscow, Russia	Decision (unanimous)	3	3:00
2013-05-13	Win	(Turkey) Adem Bozkurt	Land of Fire	Vienna, Austria	KO	1	
2013-04-27	Win	(Netherlands) William Diender	W5 Grand Prix Orel XXI	Oryol, Russia	Decision (unanimous)	3	3:00
2013-03-16	Win	(Slovakia) Vladimir Konsky	W5 Fighter Bratislava XX, Final	Bratislava, Slovakia	Decision	3	3:00
Wins The 2013 W5 -71 kg Tournament Title.
2013-03-16	Win	(Turkey) Tevfik Sucu	W5 Fighter Bratislava XX, Semi Finals	Bratislava, Slovakia	Decision	3	3:00
2013-02-22	Loss	(Azerbaijan) Chingiz Allazov	Knockout Show	Moscow, Russia	Decision (unanimous)	3	3:00
2012-12-23	Win	(Russia) Stanislav Kazantcev	W5 Fighter Moscow XVIII	Moscow, Russia	Decision (unanimous)	3	3:00
2012-11-29	Win	(Russia) Ivan Babachenko	W5 Fighter Moscow XVII	Moscow, Russia	Decision (unanimous)	3	3:00
2012-11-24	Win	(Greece) Vasilis Kakarikos	Extreme Fighting	Thessaloniki, Greece	TKO	3	
2012-11-08	Win	(Kazakhstan) Vladimir Shulyak	W5 Fighter Moscow XVI	Moscow, Russia	Decision (unanimous)	3	3:00
2012-10-20	Win	(Russia) Denis Larchenko	Grand Prix Russia Open, Final	Russia	Decision (unanimous)	3	3:00
Wins The 2012 Grand Prix Russia Open Tournament Title.
2012-10-20	Win	(Ukraine) Valentin Ribalko	Grand Prix Russia Open, Semi Finals	Russia	KO (knee)	1	
2012-08-24	Win	(Belgium) Alka Matewa	W5 Fighter Moscow XIII	Moscow, Russia	Decision	3	3:00
2012-02-24	Win	(Russia) Ivan Busarov	W5 Fighter Moscow X	Moscow, Russia	KO	2	
2012-01-21	Win	(Russia) Elkun Orudzhev	Corona Cup 16	Russia	Decision (split)	3	3:00
2011-10-22	Win	(Netherlands) Aziz Kallah	W5 Grand Prix Moscow	Moscow, Russia	Decision (split)	3	3:00
2011-09-02	Win	(Belarus) Kirill Marchenko	W5 Grand Prix	Poltava, Ukraine	TKO	3	
2011-04-09	Loss	(Russia) Vyacheslav Borschev	W5 Grand Prix "KO"	Moscow, Russia	Decision	3	3:00
2011-02-23	Loss	(Ukraine) Ruslan Kushnirenko		Odesa, Ukraine	Decision	3	3:00
2010-11-27	Win	(Ukraine) Vladislav Morgulets		Kyiv, Ukraine	Ext.R decision	4	3:00
2010-10-04	Loss	(Ukraine) Vladislav Savotchenko		Yalta, Ukraine	Ext.R decision	4	3:00
Legend: Win Loss Draw/no contest Notes

Amateur Muay Thai and kickboxing record
Date	Result	Opponent	Event	Location	Method	Round	Time
2025-11-27	Loss	(Serbia) Nikola Todorović	2025 WAKO World Championship, Quarterfinals	Abu Dhabi, UAE	Decision (3:0)	3	2:00
2025-11-25	Win	(Canada) Joseph Nabong	2025 WAKO World Championship, Second Round	Abu Dhabi, UAE	Decision (3:0)	3	2:00
2025-11-24	Win	(Republic of Ireland) Damian Darker	2025 WAKO World Championship, First Round	Abu Dhabi, UAE	Decision (3:0)	3	2:00
2014-05-04	Loss	(Thailand) Thongchai Sitsongpeenong	2014 IFMA World Championships, 1/8 Final	Langkawi, Malaysia	Decision	3	3:00
2013-07-	Loss	(Belarus) Vitaly Gurkov	2013 IFMA European Championship, Final	Lisbon, Portugal	Decision	4	2:00
Wins 2013 IFMA European Championships -71kg Silver Medal.
Legend: Win Loss Draw/no contest Notes

== See also ==
- List of K-1 events
- List of K-1 champions
- List of male kickboxers
