= Vladimír Moravčík =

Slovak middleweight Muay Thai Fighter (born 1981)

- Born: December 5, 1981 (age 44); Banská Bystrica, Czechoslovakia
- Other names: Dracula
- Nationality: Slovakia
- Height: 1.86 m (6 ft 1 in)
- Weight: 77 kg (170 lb; 12.1 st)
- Division: middle
- Fighting out of: Banská Bystrica, Slovakia
- Trainer: Jozef Poliak
- Years active: 2004–2022

Kickboxing record
- Total: 95
- Wins: 85
- By knockout: 31
- Losses: 9
- By knockout: 5
- Draws: 1

Vladimír Moravčík (born December 5, 1981) is a Slovak middleweight Muay Thai Fighter.

He was ranked #7 light heavyweight kickboxer in the world in May 2011, by Liverkick.com.

== Biography and career ==
Moravčík started training Muay Thai when he joined the Fire Gym in his hometown of Banská Bystrica in Slovakia. This was after he got out of the army, where he'd had some Muay Thai training.

The highlight of his career was his fight against former Rajadamnern Stadium Champion and world title holder, Diesellek TopkingBoxing, which he won by KO.

Moravčík has signed with the newly formed Muay Thai Premier League.

He beat Jose Barradas on October 27, 2012, in Nitra, Slovakia when Barradas broke his leg in round one.

He competed in a four-man tournament at W5 Slovakia on March 16, 2013, stopping Artem Litvinenko with second round body shots in the semi-finals before facing Darryl Sichtman in the final. After three rounds, the judges declared an extra round but he was unable to continue having been damaged from repeated low kicks.

== Titles and accomplishments ==
- 2018 Enfusion 80 kg World champion
- 2017 Enfusion 80 kg World champion
- 2016 WMC World Middleweight (-72.6 kg) Champion
- 2015 WFCA World Muay Thai (-75 kg) Champion
- 2013 WMC European Muay Thai (-76.2 kg) Champion
- 2013 W5 Slovakia 75 kg Tournament runner-up
- 2010 I-1 Grand Slam Champion
- 2010 W5 League World Champion K-1 (75 kg) Champion
- 2010 WPMF Intercontinental Muay Thai Champion
- 2009 WKN European Muay Thai Champion
- 2008 Dodge Trophy Winner
- 2007 I-1 WMC World Muay Thai Champion
- 2005 S-1 European Muay Thai Champion

== Muay Thai and kickboxing record ==
Professional Muay Thai and kickboxing record
85 wins (31 (T)KOs), 9 losses, 2 draws
Date	Result	Opponent	Event	Location	Method	Round	Time
2022-06-18	Win	(Brazil) Joao Paulo de Carvalho	DFN 7: Nastal čas	Zvolen, Slovakia	Decision (unanimous)	3	3:00
2021-02-27	Win	(Slovakia) Igor Daniš	Oktagon UNGD: Last Man Standing	Brno, Czech Republic	KO (left body hook)	1	2:30
2019-04-27	Loss	(Netherlands) Robin Ciric	Enfusion live	Žilina, Slovakia	KO	4	
For the Enfusion -80kg title.
2018-12-01	Win	(Thailand) Saknarong Suklerd	Enfusion	Czech Republic	KO (right mid kick)	3	0:38
2018-10-27	Loss	(France) Yohan Lidon	Fight Legend Geneva	Geneva, Switzerland	TKO (ref. stop/right cross)	1	1:45
2018-07-06	Win	(Thailand) Thongchai Sitsongpeenong	All Star Fight 5	Czech Republic	Decision	3	3:00
2018-04-28	Win	(Thailand) Nampom PhuketTopTeam	Enfusion Live	Žilina, Slovakia	KO (knees)	4	1:07
2017-10-14	Draw	(Belarus) Yuri Bessmertny	Rebuy Stars Fight Night	Slovakia	Draw	3	3:00
2017-05-06	Win	(Morocco) Hicham El Gaoui	Enfusion Live	Žilina, Slovakia	Decision	5	3:00
2016-10-08	Loss	(Ukraine) Alim Nabiev	W5 Grand Prix "Legends in Prague"	Prague, Czech Republic	Decision (unanimous)	5	3:00
Lost the W5 World Muay Thai Championship -77kg .
2016-04-23	Win	(Thailand) Weerawaut Kaewkamnerd	Enfusion 39	Žilina, Slovakia	Decision	5	3:00
Wins the WMC Intercontinental Middleweight (-72.6 kg) Championship.
2015-12-05	Win	(Czech Republic) Matouš Kohout	GIBU Fight Night 2	Prague, Czech republic	Decision	3	3:00
2015-10-03	Win	(United States) Dorian Price	Simpy the best - 6	Poprad, Slovakia	TKO (referee stoppage)	1	2:59
2015-05-30	Win	(Albania) Shkodran Veseli	Full Fight 1 - Slovakia and Czech vs. Russia	Banská Bystrica, Slovakia	Decision (unanimous)	3	3:00
2015-04-25	Win	(France) Yohan Lidon	Gala Night Thaiboxing / Enfusion Live 28	Žilina, Slovakia	Decision (unanimous)	5	3:00
Wins WFCA World Muay Thai title -75 kg
2014-11-30	Loss	(Netherlands) Darryl Sichtman	W5 Crossroad of Times	Bratislava, Slovakia	Decision	5	3:00
For W5 World Muay Thai Championship -77kg .
2014-04-26	Win	(Suriname) Miles Simson	Gala Night Thaiboxing / Enfusion Live 17	Žilina, Slovakia	Decision (unanimous)	3	3:00
2014-04-11	Loss	(France) Djibril Eouho	Heroes Gate 12	Prague, Czech republic	Decision (unanimous)	3	3:00
2014-01-25	Win	(France) Abdrerrahim Chaffay	Clash Muay Thai	Bratislava, Slovakia	KO	1	2:36
2013-06-01	Win	(Suriname) Marco Piqué	Profiliga Muaythai 13	Banská Bystrica, Slovakia	Decision (unanimous)	5	3:00
Wins WMC European Muay Thai (-76.2 kg) Championship.
2013-03-16	Loss	(Suriname) Darryl Sichtman	W5 Slovakia, Final	Bratislava, Slovakia	TKO (corner stoppage)	3	3:00
For W5 Slovakia 75kg Tournament Title.
2013-03-16	Win	(Ukraine) Artem Litvinenko	W5 Slovakia, Semi Finals	Bratislava, Slovakia	KO (body punches)	2	
2012-12-08	Win	(France) Raphaël Llodra	Fight Explosion	Bratislava, Slovakia	Decision (unanimous)	3	3:00
2012-10-27	Win	(Portugal) Jose Barradas	Nitrianska Noc Bojovnikov	Nitra, Slovakia	TKO (broken leg)	1	
2012-05-26	Loss	(Thailand) Yodsanklai Fairtex	Profiliga Muaythai 12	Banská Bystrica, Slovakia	TKO	3	
For WMC World Muaythai title (160 lbs).
2012-03-31	Win	(Portugal) Gil Silva	Gala Night Thaiboxing 2012	Žilina, Slovakia	TKO (punch)	2	0:28
2011-11-06	Win	(France) Yohan Lidon	Muay Thai Premier League 3rd Round	The Hague, Netherlands	Decision (unanimous)	3	3:00
2011-10-08	Draw	(Italy) Rosario Presti	Muaythai Premier League: Round 2	Padua, Italy	Decision draw	5	3:00
2011-06-23	Win	(Armenia) Anatoly Hunanyan	Heroes Gate 4	Prague, Czech Republic	Decision	3	3:00
2011-05-28	Win	(Thailand) Diesellek TopkingBoxing	PROFILIGA MUAY THAI XI.	Banská Bystrica, Slovakia	KO	4	1:51
2011-03-12	Win	(Morocco) Khalid Chabrani	Gala Night Thaiboxing	Žilina, Slovakia	TKO	1	2:41
2011-02-05	Win	(France) Abdoul Toure	Slovak Power Ring of Honor	Nitra, Slovakia	TKO (referee stoppage)	3	2:06
2010-12-10	Win	(France) Mohamed Houmer	Noc bojovníků Hodonín	Hodonín, Czech Republic	TKO	3	
2010-11-20	Win	(Germany) Andreas Rogner	I-1 World Muay Thai Grand Slam 2010, Final	Hong Kong	KO	2	
Wins I-1 WMC World Muay Thai.
2010-11-20	Win	(Brazil) Thiago Teixeira	I-1 World Muay Thai Grand Slam 2010, Semi Final	Hong Kong	Decision (unanimous)	3	3:00
2010-09-25	Win	(Kyrgyzstan) Uranbek Esenkulov	W5 League Gala	Moscow, Russia	Decision (unanimous)	5	3:00
Wins W5 League World Champion K-1 (75 kg).
2010-05-29	Win	(Moldova) Cristian Dorel	PROFILIGA Muay Thai X	Banská Bystrica, Slovakia	TKO (referee stoppage)	4	
2010-05-01	Win	(United Kingdom) Simon Chu	One Songchai	Rimini, Italy	KO (liver punch)	3	
2010-03-21	Win	(Syria) Fadi Merza	Gala Night Žilina 2010	Žilina, Slovakia	Decision	3	3:00
2009-12-12	Loss	(Ukraine) Artur Kyshenko	K-1 ColliZion 2009 Final Tournament, Super Fight	Prague, Czech Republic	KO (right high kick)	2	2:43
2009-10-16	Win	(Suriname) Foad Sadeghi	Return of the Gladiators 2009 Brno	Brno, Czech Republic	Decision	5	3:00
2009-08-29	Win	(Suriname) Murthel Groenhart	It's Showtime 2009 Budapest	Budapest, Hungary	Decision	3	3:00
2009-06-24	Win	(Poland) Robert Zytkiewicz	Noc Bojovniku	Šumperk, Czech Republic		5	
For WKN European Super Welterweight Muaythai title (72,6 kg).
2009-05-23	Win	(Thailand) Pracha Somchan	PROFILIGA Muay Thai IX	Banská Bystrica, Slovakia	Decision	5	3:00
2009-03-14	Win	(Thailand) Berneung Topkingboxing	Gala Night Thaiboxing	Žilina, Slovakia	Decision (majority)	5	3:00
2008-11-16	Win	(Armenia) Armen Petrosyan	Dodge Trophy 2008, Final	Ulm, Germany	KO	5	
Wins Dodge Trophy 2008.
2008-11-16	Win	(Albania) Alban Ahmeti	Dodge Trophy 2008, Semi Finals	Ulm, Germany	Decision	3	
2008-11-16	Win	(Albania) Labinot Ahmeti	Dodge Trophy 2008, Quarter Finals	Ulm, Germany	Decision (unanimous)	3	3:00
2008-10-11	Loss	(Brazil) Cosmo Alexandre	I-1 GP EURO Muay Thai	Bratislava, Slovakia	Decision	5	3:00
2008-09-12	Win	(Italy) Marfio Canoletti	K-1 Slovakia 2008	Bratislava, Slovakia	Decision (unanimous)	3	3:00
2008-06-28	Win	(Belarus) Yuri Gorbachev	PROFILIGA Muay Thai VII	Banská Bystrica, Slovakia	Decision	5	3:00
2008-04-06	Win	(Belarus) Pavel Abozn	PROFILIGA Muay Thai VI	Banská Bystrica, Slovakia	KO	3	
2008-02-10	Win	(Lithuania) Edvardas Norieulikus		Žilina, Slovakia	KO (right cross)	2	0:58
2007-12-30	Win	(Thailand) Olan Sor Thaweesist	Christmas Fighters Evening	Prague, Czech Republic	KO	3	0:28
2007-10-15	Win	(Thailand) Kit Sitpholek	I-1 4 Man Tournament 2008, Finals	Hong Kong	KO	2	
Wins I-1 WMC World Muay Thai Championship.
2007-10-15	Win	(Belarus) Denis Varaksa	I-1 4 Man Tournament 2008, Semi Finals	Hong Kong	TKO	3	
2007-09-07	Win	(France) Walid Haddad	Noc Bojovníkov 2007	Bratislava, Slovakia	Decision	3	3:00
2007-07-07	Win	(Slovakia) Milos Selesi	PROFILIGA Muay Thai III	Banská Bystrica, Slovakia	Decision		
2007-05-26	Win	(Hungary) Barnabas Szucs	PROFILIGA Muay Thai II	Banská Bystrica, Slovakia	Decision (unanimous)	5	3:00
2007-02-20	Win	(Japan) Kazuyoshi Imara			KO (left hook)	4	1:22
2006-12-30	Win	(Thailand) Prasanchai Looknongyangtoy	Christmas Fighters Evening	Prague, Czech Republic	Decision	5	3:00
2006-09-26	Win	(Czech Republic) Jiří Apeltauer	Fighters Evening	Pardubice, Czech Republic	Decision		
2006-04-20	Win	(Czech Republic) Jaroslav Devera	Fighters Evening	Liberec, Czech Republic	Decision		
2006-03-30	Win	(Kazakhstan) Igor Chin	Fighters Evening	Pardubice, Czech Republic	Decision		
2005-05-27	Win	(Poland) Maciej Skupiński	S-1 Extravaganza	Ostrava, Czech Republic	KO (right elbow)	1	
Legend: Win Loss Draw/no contest Notes

== Exhibition boxing record ==
0 fights	0 wins	0 losses
By decision	1	0

No.	Result	Record	Opponent	Type	Round, time	Date	Location	Notes
1	Win	1–0	(Slovakia) Rony Paradeiser	UD	4	May 21, 2021	Prague, Czech Republic	

== See also ==
- List of K-1 events
- List of K-1 champions
- List of It's Showtime events
- List of male kickboxers
