= Massimo Rigamonti =

Italian kickboxer

- Born: 1997 (age 28–29); Province of Lecco, Italy
- Height: 1.87 m (6 ft 1 1/2 in)
- Weight: 85 kg (187 lb; 13.4 st)
- Style: Kickboxing
- Stance: Orthodox
- Fighting out of: Lecco, Italy
- Team: Iron Team

Kickboxing record
- Total: 20
- Wins: 20
- By knockout: 8
- Losses: 0
- Draws: 0

Massimo Rigamonti is an Italian kickboxer.

As of October 2026, he was ranked as the tenth best -85 kg kickboxer in the world by Beyond Kickboxing.

== Career ==
On February 1, 2023, Rigamonti defeated Aristote Quitusisa by unanimous decision at the Elite Fight 10 event.

Rigamonti faced Yohan Lidon at Imperial Fight on July 27, 2024. He won the fight by decision after scoring a knockdown.

On April 25, 2026, Riagmonti faced Anthony Silvestri at the Purple Olympus event for the interim WAKO Pro K-1 European Light Cruiserweight title. He won the fight by second round knockout with a high kick.

== Championships and accomplishments ==
- World Association of Kickboxing Organizations
  - 2025 WAKO-Pro K-1 Italian Light Cruiserweight (-85 kg) Champion
  - 2026 interim WAKO-Pro K-1 European Light Cruiserweight (-85 kg) Champion
- Fight Clubbing
  - 2026 Fight Clubbing K-1 World Light Cruiserweight (-85.1 kg) Champion
- Gladius World Series
  - 2022 Gladius World Series Middleweight (-85 kg) Champion
- World Boxing Fighters Corporation
  - 2023 WBFC K-1 Italian Champion
    - One successful title defense
  - 2025 WBFC K-1 European Champion

== Fight record ==
Professional Kickboxing Record
20 Wins (8 (T)KOs), 0 Loss
Date	Result	Opponent	Event	Location	Method	Round	Time
2026-11-21	Win	(Spain) Damián Martín Laquoi	Fight Clubbing 45	Lamezia Terme, Italy	KO		
Won the vacant Fight Clubbing K-1 World Light Cruiserweight (-85.1 kg) title.
2026-09-19	Win	(Turkey) Ozan Alparslan	Fight Clubbing 43	Izmir, Turkey	TKO (referee stoppage)	3	
2026-04-25	Win	(France) Anthony Silvestri	Purple: Olympus	Lecco, Italy	KO (high kick)	2	
Wins the interim WAKO Pro K-1 European Light Cruiserweight (-85.1 kg) title.
2025-12-20	Win	(Italy) Ramon Quirini	Fight Clubbing 40	San Marino	Decision (split)	3	3:00
2025-11-22	Win	(Moldova) Lucian Genunchi	PetrosyanMania	Milan, Italy	Decision (unanimous)	3	3:00
2025-05-24	Win	(Italy) Nicholas Vasta	PetrosyanMania Gold Edition	Milan, Italy	KO (knee to the head)	3	0:53
Wins the vacant WAKO Pro K-1 Italian Light Cruiserweight (-85.1 kg) title.
2025-02-25	Win	(Italy) Omar Seroukh	RingMania	Cornaredo, Italy	KO (right cross)	2	
Wins the WBFC K-1 European title.
2024-11-30	Win	(Italy) Alex Scialino	PetrosyanMania Gold Edition	Monza, Italy	KO (left hook to the body)	2	
2024-10-04	Win	(Italy) Ramon Quirini	RingMania Gold Edition	Cornaredo, Italy	TKO (corner stoppage)	4	
Defends the WBFC K-1 Italian title.
2024-07-27	Win	(France) Yohan Lidon	Imperial Fight	Orange, France	Decision	3	3:00
2024-05-18	Win	(Tunisia) Ayoub Ghraidia	PetrosyanMania Gold Edition	Milan, Italy	KO (knee to the head)	1	2:31
2024-04-06	Win	(Italy) Vittorio Iermano	La Notte Dei Campioni	Seregno, Italy	KO	1	
2024-02-24	Win	(Italy) Sebastian Girardi	Lamborghini Fighters Cup	Cornaredo, Italy	TKO (referee stoppage)	3	
2023-10-28	Win	(Italy) Simone Podestà	RingMania 9	Cornaredo, Italy	Decision (unanimous)	3	3:00
Wins the WBFC K-1 Italian title.
2023-04-25	Win	(Italy) Mattia Tedesco	Purple Punch	Lecco, Italy	Decision (unanimous)	3	3:00
2023-02-25	Win	(Italy) Simone Podestà	RingMania 8	Cornaredo, Italy	Decision (unanimous)	3	3:00
2023-02-01	Win	(France) Aristote Quitusisa	Elite Fight 10	Saint Brieuc, France	Decision (unanimous)	3	3:00
2022-11-26	Win	(Romania) Vasile Amariței	Gladius World Series 1	Cornaredo, Italy	Decision (unanimous)	3	3:00
Wins the inaugural Gladius World Series Middleweight (-85 kg) title.
Legend: Win Loss Draw/No contest Notes

== See also ==
- List of male kickboxers
