= Cosmo Alexandre =

Brazilian mixed martial artist and kickboxer

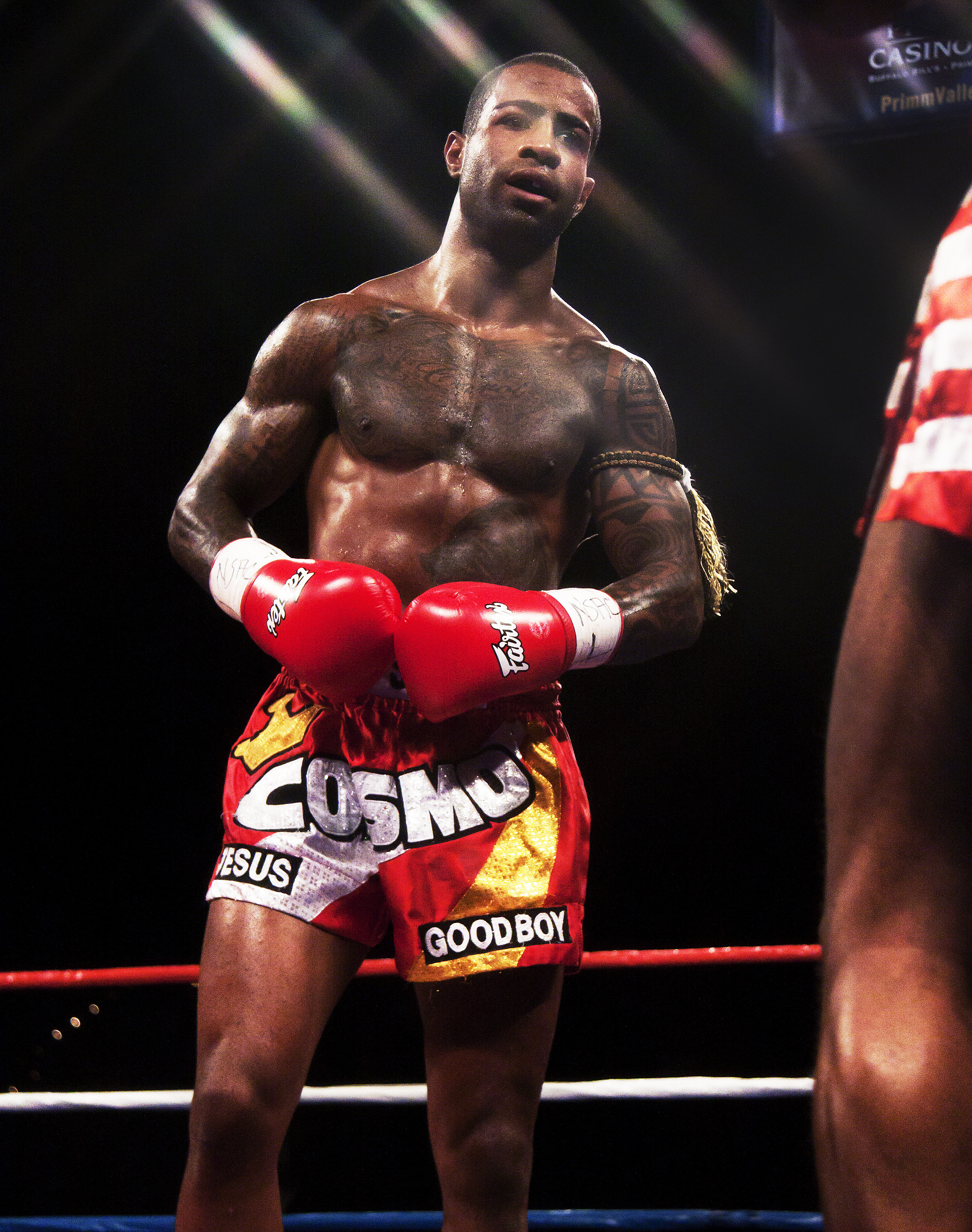
- Alexandre at Battle in the Desert II vs Cyrus Washington
- Born: Cosmo Alexandre Moreira da Rocha; 31 July 1982 (age 44); São Vicente, São Paulo, Brazil
- Other names: Good Boy
- Height: 6 ft 2 in (188 cm)
- Weight: 185 lb (84 kg; 13 st 3 lb)
- Division: Middleweight; Lightweight/Welterweight (MMA)
- Style: Kickboxing, Boxing
- Fighting out of: Naples, Florida, United States
- Team: Kor Romsrithong (2007–2011); Mike's Gym (2009–2011); Blackzilians (2011–2014)
- Trainer: Leo Elias Sossegolo
- Rank: Black prajied in Muay Thai; Purple belt in Brazilian Jiu-Jitsu
- Years active: 2004–2022 (Kickboxing); 2011–2019 (MMA); 2010 (Boxing)

Professional boxing record
- Total: 2
- Wins: 2
- By knockout: 1

Kickboxing record
- Total: 96
- Wins: 76
- By knockout: 23
- Losses: 19
- By knockout: 2
- Draws: 1

Mixed martial arts record
- Total: 9
- Wins: 8
- By knockout: 6
- By decision: 2
- Losses: 1
- By decision: 1

Other information
- Mixed martial arts record from Sherdog
- Last updated on: 23 May 2014

Cosmo Alexandre Moreira da Rocha (born 24 April 1982) is a Brazilian professional kickboxer and mixed martial artist. He is a former It's Showtime 77MAX World Champion, WMC Intercontinental and WPMF World Champion, W5 World Champion.

On 5 December 2009, he won WMC King's Cup Challenger Tournament in Bangkok, Thailand.

Since was a professional MMA competitor from 2011 until 2022. He has competed for Bellator and Legacy Fighting Championship, and ONE Championship.

== Background ==
Alexandre, who is named after his grandfather, was born in São Vicente, São Paulo and raised in Santos, Sao Paulo. Growing up, Alexandre competed in football and was talented, going on to play professionally, but ultimately chose to focus on a career in Muay Thai. Alexandre began training in Muay Thai at the age of 19.

== Kickboxing career ==
Alexandre began his professional kickboxing career in October 2004 in his native Brazil. In 2007 he experienced the highs and lows of the kickboxing world as he won the WMC Middleweight (160 lbs) Intercontinental Championship and the WPMF Middleweight (160 lbs) World Championship, only to lose them later in the year.

In 2008, Alexandre became a contestant on the It's Showtime Reality TV series. He made it to the finals against Sem Braan, losing via majority decision.

In 2009, Alexandre picked up his biggest kickboxing win as he defeated John Wayne Parr via TKO in the second round at Evolution 17: King of the Square Ring. He fought a total of three times that evening, winning the Evolution 17 King's Cup Qualifying tournament title in the process.

He defeated Nampon PKMuaythai via unanimous decision in the lackluster main event of Lion Fight 11 in Las Vegas on 20 September 2013.

He was scheduled to have his rubber match with John Wayne Parr at Powerplay Promotions 22 in Melbourne, Australia on 8 November 2013. However, he did not apply for his visa in time and was unable to enter the country and so he was replaced by New Zealand's Brad Riddell who Parr defeated by unanimous decision.

He defeated Mark Holst via UD in the main event of Lion Fight 15 in Ledyard, Connecticut, on 23 May 2014.

In 2015, Alexandre defeated John Wayne Parr in the long-awaited rubber match by unanimous decision at Lion Fight 25. He won the Lion Fight Super Middleweight Belt.

Alexandre defeated Elliot Compton by second-round knockout at ONE: Heroes of Honor on 20 April 2018.

Alexandre lost to Nieky Holzken by second-round knockout at ONE: Warrior's Dream on 17 November 2018.

Alexandre faced Juan Cervantes on 19 November 2022, at ONE on Prime Video 4. He won the fight via technical knockout in the second round and announced his retirement during the post-fight interview.

== Mixed martial arts career ==
=== Bellator Fighting Championships ===
In August 2011, Alexandre signed a multi-fight deal with the Bellator Fighting Championships, a United States-based mixed martial arts promotion.

Alexandre had a disappointing debut in October 2011 as he lost to Josh Quayhagen via decision at Bellator 52. He subsequently rebounded with a current streak of 5 wins in a row (all in Bellator)- a TKO win over Avery McPhatter at Bellator 58; a decision win over Lowrant-T Nelson at Bellator 67; a TKO win over Harry Johnson at Bellator 73; a TKO win due to doctor's stoppage over Mike Bannon at Bellator 77; and a decision win over Josh Quayhagen, avenging his only loss in a rematch at Bellator 80. He amassed a 5–1 record in Bellator.

Additionally, Alexandre trained extensively with Rashad Evans and K-1 fighter Tyrone Spong leading up to Evans' fight at UFC 133 with Tito Ortiz.

=== World Series of Fighting ===
In November 2015, Alexandre signed an exclusive deal with World Series of Fighting. However, the promotion never used Alexandre and he was eventually allowed to fight elsewhere.

=== ONE Championship ===
Alexandre ended up signing a six-fight contract with the ONE Championship in 2018.

After nearly three years away from MMA action, Alexandre faced Sage Northcutt on 17 May 2019 at the ONE Championship: Enter the Dragon. He won the fight via knockout just 29 seconds into the first round.

On 11 August 2020, Alexandre revealed that he had signed a new, six-fight contract with ONE Championship. Alexandre faced Juan Cervantes in a Muay Thai bout, his first fight after re-signing with the promotion, at ONE on Prime Video 4 on 19 November 2022. He won the fight by a second-round technical knockout. He announced his retirement after the fight.

== Titles ==
- ONE Championship
  - Performance of the Night (one time) vs. Juan Cervantes
- World version W5
  - 2016 W5 World Champion -75 kg
  - 2014 W5 Kickboxing World Champion -71 kg
- A.M.T.I.
  - 2015 A.M.T.I. (162lbs) South American
- Lion Fight
  - 2015 Lion Fight Promotions Super middleweight Champion
- It's Showtime
  - 2010 It's Showtime 77MAX World Championship (1 defense)
  - 2008 It's Showtime Reality finalist
- World Muaythai Council
  - 2010 WMC/S1 King's Cup Challenger Tournament runner up
  - 2009 WMC/S1 King's Cup Challenger Tournament Champion
  - 2007 WMC Intercontinental Champion (160 lbs)
- Evolution 17
  - 2009 Evolution 17 Winner King's Cup Qualifying tournament champion
- World Professional Muaythai Federation
  - 2007 WPMF Middleweight World Champion (160 lbs)

== Kickboxing and Muay Thai record ==
Professional kickboxing record
43 wins (19 (T)KOs, 24 decisions), 15 losses, 1 draw
Date	Result	Opponent	Event	Location	Method	Round	Time
2022-11-19	Win	(England) Juan Cervantes	ONE on Prime Video 4	Kallang, Singapore	KO (right elbow)	2	1:23
2018-11-17	Loss	(Netherlands) Nieky Holzken	ONE: Warrior's Dream	Jakarta, Indonesia	KO (uppercut)	2	2:59
2018-04-20	Win	(Australia) Elliot Compton	ONE: Heroes of Honor	Philippines	KO (left knee to the body)	2	2:46
2017-01-13	Win	(China) Tan Xiaofeng	Superstar Fight 7	Hunan, China	Decision (unanimous)	3	3:00
2016-10-08	Win	(Czech Republic) Matouš Kohout	W5 Grand Prix "Legends in Prague", Semi Finals	Prague, Czech Republic	Decision (unanimous)	3	3:00
Wins W5 Tournament for World Championship -75 kg.
2016-10-08	Win	(Netherlands) Darryl Sichtman	W5 Grand Prix "Legends in Prague", Semi Finals	Prague, Czech Republic	Ext. R. decision (unanimous)	4	3:00
2016-02-27	Win	(China) Luo Can	Superstar Fight 1	China	KO (left jumping knee to the body)	3	3:00
2015-12-05	Loss	(Russia) Artem Pashporin	W5 Grand Prix Vienna XXXI	Vienna, Austria	Decision (unanimous)	3	3:00
2015-11-22	Win	(Argentina) Julio Dominguez	Portuários Stadium	São Paulo, Brazil	KO (knee to the ribs)	1	2:00
Wins A.M.T.I. (162lbs) South American.
2015-10-23	Win	(Australia) John Wayne Parr	Lion Fight 25	Temecula, California, USA	Decision (unanimous)	5	3:00
Wins The Lion Fight Super Middleweight Title.
2015-08-30	Win	(Netherlands) Marco Piqué	W5 GRAND PRIX MOSCOW XXX	Moscow, Russia	Decision (unanimous)	3	3:00
2015-01-16	Win	(Suriname) Regian Eersel	Legacy Kickboxing 1	Houston, USA	Decision (unanimous)	3	3:00
2014-11-30	Win	(Russia) Alexander Surzhko	W5 Crossroad of Times, Semi Finals	Bratislava, Slovakia	Decision (unanimous)	3	3:00
Wins W5 -71 kg Tournament for W5 World Championship. Surzhko replaced injured Beqiri.
2014-11-30	Win	(Russia) Dzhabar Askerov	W5 Crossroad of Times, Semi Finals	Bratislava, Slovakia	Decision (unanimous)	3	3:00
2014-08-01	Loss	(Thailand) Jo Nattawut	Lion Fight 17	Ledyard, Connecticut, USA	Decision (unanimous)	5	3:00
2014-06-27	Loss	(France) Yohan Lidon	Strikefight	Lyon, France	Decision (unanimous)	3	3:00
2014-05-23	Win	(Canada) Mark Holst	Lion Fight 15	Ledyard, Connecticut, USA	Decision (unanimous)	5	3:00
2013-09-20	Win	(Thailand) Nampon PKMuaythai	Lion Fight 11	Las Vegas, NV	Decision (unanimous)	5	3:00
2011-08-20	Loss	(Thailand) Sakmongkol Sithchuchok	Battle in the Desert 3	Primm, NV	Decision (unanimous)	5	3:00
2011-05-14	Win	(United States) Cyrus Washington	Battle in the Desert 2	Primm, NV	Decision (unanimous)	5	3:00
2011-03-12	Loss	(Italy) Giorgio Petrosyan	Fight Code: Dragon Series Round 2	Milan, Italy	Decision	3	3:00
2010-12-05	Loss	(Thailand) Yodsanklai Fairtex	King's Birthday 2010, Final	Bangkok, Thailand	Decision	3	2:00
Fight was for WMC/S1 King's Cup Challenger tournament title.
2010-12-05	Win	(Germany) Alex Vogel	King's Birthday 2010, Semi Finals	Bangkok, Thailand	Decision	3	2:00
2010-12-05	Win	(Canada) Jesse Miles	King's Birthday 2010, Quarter Finals	Bangkok, Thailand	Decision	3	2:00
2010-05-29	Loss	(Netherlands) Nieky Holzken	It's Showtime 2010 Amsterdam	Amsterdam, Netherlands	Decision (4–1)	3	3:00
2010-04-17	Win	(Hungary) Csaba Györfy	It's Showtime 2010 Budapest	Budapest, Hungary	TKO (doctor stoppage)	1	N/A
Retains It's Showtime 77MAX title.
2010-03-13	Win	(Belarus) Dmitry Shakuta	Oktagon presents: It's Showtime 2010	Milan, Italy	TKO (doctor stoppage)	2	N/A
Wins It's Showtime 77MAX title.
2009-12-05	Win	(Thailand) Madsua	Kings Birthday 2009 Muaythai Championship, Sanam Luang	Bangkok, Thailand	TKO (low kicks)	2	N/A
Wins WMC/S1 King's Cup Challenger tournament title.
2009-12-05	Win	(Thailand) Naruepol Fairtex	Kings Birthday 2009 Muaythai Championship, Sanam Luang	Bangkok, Thailand	TKO (low kick)	3	N/A
2009-12-05	Win	(Iran) Kevyan Houshangy	Kings Birthday 2009 Muaythai Championship, Sanam Luang	Bangkok, Thailand	TKO (doctor stoppage)	2	N/A
2009-08-29	Win	(Thailand) Madsua	Evolution 17: King of the Square Ring	Chandler, Australia	Decision (unanimous)	3	3:00
Wins Evolution 17 King's Cup Qualifying tournament title.
2009-08-29	Win	(Australia) John Wayne Parr	Evolution 17: King of the Square Ring	Chandler, Australia	TKO (low kicks)	2	N/A
2009-08-29	Win	(Russia) Dzhabar Askerov	Evolution 17: King of the Square Ring	Chandler, Australia	Decision (unanimous)	3	3:00
2009-06-26	Loss	(Thailand) Yodsaenklai Fairtex	Champions of Champions 2	Montego Bay, Jamaica	KO (left low kick)	4	0:25
Fight was for WMC Middleweight (160lbs) World title.
2009-02-14	Win	(Suriname) Murthel Groenhart	Oktagon presents: It's Showtime 2009	Milan, Italy	Decision (unanimous)	3	3:00
2008-10-18	Loss	(Australia) Eugene Ekkelboom	Supremacy Part 5 "Unbreakable"	Perth, Western Australia	Decision (split)	5	3:00
2008-04-26	Loss	(Netherlands) Sem Braan	K-1 World GP '08 Amsterdam, It's Showtime Reality TV Show '08 Final	Amsterdam, Netherlands	Decision (majority)	3	3:00
Fight was for It's Showtime Series Season I Final.
2008-01-28	Win	(Spain) Carlos Cabrera	N/A	Suphanburi, Thailand	Decision (unanimous)	5	3:00
2007-12-23	Win	(France) Gregory Choplin	It's Showtime Reality TV 2008, Semi Final	Koh Samui, Thailand	Ext. R. KO (flying knee)	4	
2007-12-23	Win	(Greece) Asonitis Costa	It's Showtime Reality TV 2008, Quarter Final	Koh Samui, Thailand	Decision (unanimous)	3	3:00
2007-12-01	Loss	(Australia) John Wayne Parr	Evolution 12	Chandler, Australia	Decision (unanimous)	5	3:00
Fight was for WMC Middleweight (160lbs) World title.
2007-11-20	Win	(Thailand) Leonard Sitpholek	I-1 Superfights	Hong Kong	Decision (unanimous)	5	3:00
2007-11-08	Loss	(Thailand) Lerdmongkon Sor. Tarntip	Phetjaopraya Fights, Rajadamnern Stadium	Bangkok, Thailand	Decision (unanimous)	5	3:00
Fails to capture the WMC World Middleweight title and loses the WPMF World Middleweight title.
2007-10-05	Win	(Thailand) Wanlop Sitpholek	Petchburi Stadium	Bangkok, Thailand	Decision (unanimous)	5	3:00
Wins WMC Middleweight (160lbs) Intercontinental title.
2007-09-01	Draw	(New Zealand) Shane Chapman	Philip Lam promotion	Auckland, New Zealand	Draw	5	3:00
2007-08-12	Win	(France) Ghislain Bellon	Queen's Birthday, Sanam Luang	Bangkok, Thailand	TKO	3	1:35
Wins WPMF Middleweight (160lbs) World title.
2007-06-26	Win	(United States) Ethan Sitjaipetch	Sangmorakot Fights, Lumpinee Stadium	Bangkok, Thailand	Decision (unanimous)	5	3:00
2007-04-14	Win	(Brazil) Katel Kubis	Demolition V	São Paulo, Brazil	Decision (unanimous)	5	3:00
2006-11-23	Win	(Brazil) Bruno Feitosa	Clã Fight	São Paulo, Brazil	TKO	1	N/A
2006-09-23	Win	(Brazil) Ricardo do Naciemento	Demolition IV	São Paulo, Brazil	Decision (unanimous)	5	3:00
2006-06-02	Win	(Brazil) Eduardo Pachu	1º Fight Leste	São Paulo, Brazil	KO	3	N/A
2005-11-19	Win	(Germany) Lorand Sachs	SuperLeague Portugal 2005	Carcavelos, Portugal	TKO (doctor stoppage)	3	N/A
2005-10-27	Win	(Brazil) Ariel Machado	K-1 Rules Heavyweight Factory GP	São Paulo, Brazil	Decision	5	3:00
2005-09-10	Win	(Brazil) Marcos Caçador	Predator Fight Championships	Santos, Brazil	KO (knee)	2	1:30
2005-06-20	Loss	(Italy) Gianni Laterza	Wako-Pro Kickboxing	Italy	Decision	10	2:00
2005-04-26	Win	(Brazil) Tiago Baggio	Seletiva Sul-Americana de Muay Thai	São Paulo, Brazil	KO	2	N/A
2004-05-29	Loss	(Brazil) Diego Braga	Nocaute GP: Never Shake	São Paulo, Brazil	KO	2	0:18
2004-10-23	Win	(Brazil) Ed Mancada	Shooto Brazil	São Paulo, Brazil	KO	2	N/A
Legend: Win Loss Draw/no contest Notes

== Boxing record ==
Professional boxing record
2 wins (1 (T)KO, 1 decision), 0 losses, 0 draws
Date	Result	Opponent	Event	Location	Method	Round	Time
2010-08-03	Win	(Brazil) Edaildo Silva	Torneio Estímulo Kid Jofre, semi final	São Paulo, Brazil	KO	2	N/A
2010-07-13	Win	(Brazil) Marcos Lolata	Torneio Estímulo Kid Jofre, quarter final	São Paulo, Brazil	PTS	4	3:00
Legend: Win Loss Draw/no contest Notes

== Mixed martial arts record ==
Professional record breakdown
9 matches	8 wins	1 loss
By knockout	6	0
By decision	2	1

Res.	Record	Opponent	Method	Event	Date	Round	Time	Location	Notes
Win	8–1	Sage Northcutt	KO (punch)	ONE: Enter the Dragon	17 May 2019	1	0:29	Kallang, Singapore	Welterweight bout (185 lbs).
Win	7–1	Musu Nuertiebieke	TKO (punches)	Superstar Fight 5	23 September 2016	1	N/A	Beijing, China	Catchweight (161 lb) bout.
Win	6–1	Rey Trujillo	TKO (knee and punches)	Legacy Fighting Championship 28	21 February 2014	1	3:38	Arlington, Texas, United States	
Win	5–1	Josh Quayhagen	Decision (unanimous)	Bellator 80	9 November 2012	3	5:00	Hollywood, Florida, United States	Welterweight bout.
Win	4–1	Mike Bannon	TKO (doctor stoppage)	Bellator 77	19 October 2012	2	5:00	Reading, Pennsylvania, United States	Catchweight (161 lb) bout.
Win	3–1	Harry Johnson	TKO (knee to the body)	Bellator 73	24 August 2012	2	0:39	Tunica, Mississippi, United States	
Win	2–1	LT Nelson	Decision (unanimous)	Bellator 67	4 May 2012	3	5:00	Rama, Ontario, Canada	
Win	1–1	Avery McPhatter	TKO (knees)	Bellator 58	19 November 2011	1	0:20	Hollywood, Florida, United States	Catchweight (157 lb) bout.
Loss	0–1	Josh Quayhagen	Decision (unanimous)	Bellator 52	1 October 2011	3	5:00	Lake Charles, Louisiana, United States	

== Karate combat record ==
Professional record breakdown
1 match	1 win	0 losses
By knockout	1	0

Res.	Record	Opponent	Method	Event	Date	Round	Time	Location	Notes
Loss	1–1	Ilyas Khamzin	TKO (punches)	RCC & Karate Combat 63	October 17, 2026	1	1:18	Yekaterinburg, Russia	For the Karate Combat Middleweight Championship.
Win	1–0	Igor de Castañeda	TKO (hand injury)	Karate Combat 51	December 19, 2024	3	3:00	Miami, United States	

== See also ==
- List of K-1 events
- List of It's Showtime champions
- List of male kickboxers
