= World version W5 =

World Version W5
- Company type: Private
- Industry: Kickboxing promotion
- Founded: July 2007
- Founder: Sergey Chepinoga
- Headquarters: Moscow, Russia
- Key people: Sergey Chepinoga, President W5, matchmaker
- Website: www.w5kick.com www.w5kick.tv www.w5store.ru

World version W5 (W5 professional kickboxing) is a sports promotion of Russian origin with headquarters in Bratislava, Slovakia, and Moscow, Russia. They also have representatives in Prague (Czech Republic), Almere (Netherlands), Serbia and Croatia. W5 holds professional kickboxing events across Russia and Europe with future events planned for North and South America.

W5 was established in 2007, when Sergey Chepinoga organized the first event in Budva, Montenegro at a football stadium. The event was a success and thus began W5 in the world of kickboxing. To date W5 has promoted more than 40 kickboxing events in locations like Prague (the Czech Republic), Vienna (Austria), Bratislava, Prievidza, Zvolen (Slovakia), Zagreb and Dubrovnik (Croatia), Ingolstadt (Germany), Budva (Montenegro), Minsk (Belarus), Moscow, Ryazan, Oryol, Kalyazin and other Russian cities.

== Events ==
#	Event	Date	Venue	Location	Details
42	W5 & Rebuy Stars: Fortune Favors the Brave	November 11, 2017	Rebuy Stars Kosice	Kosice, Slovakia	Daniel Gallardo def. Andrej Kedves for the W5 European Welterweight Title and Ondrej Hutnik def Miran Fabjan for the W5 European Light heavyweight title.
41	W5 "Legends Collide" Miran Fabjan vs Dzevad Poturak	September 16, 2017	Arena Bonifika	Koper, Slovenia	Vlad Tuinov def. Rhassan Muhareb to retain 71kg W5 European Title. Miran Fabjan def. Dzevad Poturak by Unanimous Decision
40	W5 "The Undefeated-Night of Gladiators II": Massaro Glunder Vs. Vlad Tuinov	April 8, 2017	Sportska Dvorana	Dubrovnik, Croatia	Vladislav Tuinov def. Massaro "The Project" Glunder by UD. Vlad retained his European belt, in 71kg and adds the vacant W5 Intercontinental belt, in 72.5kg.
39	W5 Grand Prix "KITEK" 2017: Artem Pashporin Vs. Giorgio Petrosyan	February 18, 2017	Dynamo Krylatskoe sports palace	Moscow, Russia	Giorgio "Doctor" Petrosyan def. Artem "The Spur" Pashporin in the main event of the night and seized W5 World championship belt in up to 71 kg division
38	W5 Moscow “Choose the way of a champion”	October 21, 2016	Krylya Sovetov boxing hall	Moscow, Russia	Stanislav Kazantsev def. Warren Stevelmans via UD in the main event of the night
37	W5 “Legends in Prague”	October 8, 2016	O2 Arena (Prague)	Prague, The Czech Republic	
36	W5 European League “Fortune favours the brave”	September 10, 2016	Rebuy Stars Hall	Zvolen, Slovakia	
35	W5 European league “Fortune favours the brave” XXXV	June 18, 2016	Rebuy Stars Hall	Prievidza, Slovakia	
34	W5 European league “Fortune favours the brave” XXXIV	June 4, 2016	Rebuy Stars Hall	Zagreb, Croatia	Agron Preteni of Croatia won W5 European title in up to 85 kg division by defeating Bogdan Năstase of Romania which replaced injured Miran Fabjan
33	It's W5 time Vienna “Never give up” XXXIII	May 21, 2016	Hallmann Dome	Vienna, Austria	Massaro Glunder defended his title of the W5 European Champion in up to 72,5 division in rematch against Foad Sadeghi
32	W5 Grand Prix KITEK XXXII	April 23, 2016	Krylya Sovetov Boxing Hall	Moscow, Russia	Alexander Stetsurenko won W5 world title in up to 81 kg division by defeating Errol Konning (TKO, third round of five)
31	W5 Grand Prix Vienna Winners' Energy XXXI	December 5, 2015	Admiral Dome	Vienna, Austria	Artyom Pashporin of Russia won W5 world title in up to 71 kg division by defeating Cosmo Alexandre of Brazil and Chris Ngimbi of Congo
30	W5 Grand Prix Moscow Be the best XXX	August 30, 2015	USH «Druzhba», Luzhniki	Moscow, Russia	
29	W5 Grand Prix KITEK XXIX	April 24, 2015	Boxing Academy Hall, Luzhniki, Moscow	Moscow, Russia	
27-28	W5 Crossroad of times XXXVII - XXVIII	November 29-30, 2014	Incheba Expo Arena	Bratislava, Slovakia	Cosmo Alexandre won W5 world title in up to 71 kg division by defeating Dzhabar Askerov.
26	W5 Grand Prix Rematch XXVI	October 11, 2014	Stadium «Dynamo», Krylatskoe	Moscow, Russia	
25	W5 Grand Prix Open Air XXV	June 21, 2014		Piestany, Slovakia	
24	W5 Grand Prix Oryol XXIV	March 1, 2014	Green Center	Oryol, Russia	
23	W5 Grand Prix Moscow XXIII	December 22, 2013		Moscow, Russia	
22	W5 Grand Prix Oryol XXII	November 16, 2013		Oryol, Russia	
21	W5 Grand Prix Orel XXI	April 24, 2013	Green Center	Oryol, Russia	
20	W5 Fighter Bratislava XX	March 16, 2013	Incheba Expo Arena	Bratislava, Slovakia	
19	W5 Fighter Moscow XIX	March 1, 2013	Milk Arena	Moscow, Russia	
18	W5 Fighter Moscow XVIII	December 23, 2012	Milk Arena	Moscow, Russia	
17	W5 Fighter Moscow XVII	November 29, 2012	Milk Arena	Moscow, Russia	
16	W5 Fighter Moscow XVI	November 8, 2012	Milk Arena	Moscow, Russia	
15	W5 Fighter Moscow XV	October 11, 2012	Milk Arena	Moscow, Russia	
14	W5 Fighter Moscow XIV	September 20, 2012	Milk Arena	Moscow, Russia	
13	W5 Fighter Moscow XIII	August 24, 2012	Milk Arena	Moscow, Russia	
12	W5 Fighter Moscow XII	April 19, 2012	Milk Arena	Moscow, Russia	
11	W5 Fighter Moscow XI	March 30, 2012	Milk Arena	Moscow, Russia	
10	W5 Fighter Moscow X	February 24, 2012	Milk Arena	Moscow, Russia	
9	W5 Grand Prix К. О. IX	2011		Moscow, Russia	
8	W5 League VIII	October 22, 2011		Volgograd, Russia	
7	W5 League VII	April 9, 2011		Rostov, Russia	
6	W5 League VI	February 12, 2011		Moscow, Russia	
5	W5 league V	September 25, 2010		Moscow, Russia	
4	Championship of the five continents: Grand Prix Ryazan IV	October 31, 2009		Ryazan, Russia	
3	Championship of the five continents: Grand Prix Ryazan III	November 29, 2008		Ryazan, Russia	
2	Battle on the Volga-2008 II	May 30, 2008		Kalyazin, Russia	
1	W5 Grand Prix Best vs Best I	February 23, 2008		Moscow, Russia	
	W5 Grand Prix “Shoulder to shoulder” (“Rame uz Rame”)	January 1, 2008	Rented football stadium	Budva, Montenegro	The first tournament in the history of W5. Was conducted before the official W5 brand registration.

== W5 History ==
=== W5 background and the first tournament ===
July 5, 2007, at the rented football stadium located directly on the shores of Budva, Montenegro, W5 held its first kickboxing event called "Rame uz rame" (Serb.) (Eng. "Shoulder to shoulder"). The tournament was attended by about 5,000 spectators. The main theme of the event was "Russia Vs. Balkan countries".

Formally the tournament in Budva was held before the official registration of W5. However, this tournament is considered as World Version W5's first ever event.

=== W5 structure ===
After its inaugural tournament in Budva, Sergey Chepinoga decided become independent and organize all tournaments without involving third-party promotional companies. This is why the W5 promotion company "Shoulder to Shoulder" (in Russian "Plechom k Plechu") was established and for some period carried out all the matchmaking for W5 events. As of 2016 W5 and Shoulder to Shoulder split into two separate entities with W5 organizing all the events and matchmaking outside of Russia, while Shoulder to Shoulder organizes the yearly W5 KITEK event in honor of Yuri Stupenkov in Moscow, Russia.

Sergey Chepinoga is the president of W5 and matchmaker for all W5 events.

=== Early tournaments ===
The first W5 tournaments were held under K-1 rules with some additional rules from "Bars," which are based on the Russian army combat system being implemented. Over the years, W5 has developed its own rules, which are now used at all W5 events.

=== World version W5 in 2016 ===
In 2016 World version W5 will put on seven professional kickboxing tournaments, four of which will be conducted as a special series called "W5 European league". A significant part of all the events scheduled in Europe. There was one event conducted in Russia on April 23 called W5 Grand Prix KITEK during which the famous Russian athlete Alexander Stetsurenko won the W5 world championship belt in the weight category up to 81 kg, he defeated the longtime principal opponent Errol Koning of the Netherlands by KO.

=== W5's 2017 Summer Boot Camp ===
From August 4-14 W5 held its first ever Summer Boot Camp in Novi Sad, Serbia. The event brought together some of the world's top trainers and fighters. The trainers who led the camp were Nathan "Carnage" Corbett, Mike Van Itterzon, Andrey Chadin and Misa Baculov. The fighters who trained alongside guests were Darryl "K.O. Specialist" Sichtman, Vlad "Diamond" Tuinov, Andrej "AK-47" Kedves, Vladimir Idranyi, Miran "Slovenian Rocky" Fabjan, and Cosmo "Good Boy" Alexandre. The event included 3 trainings per day and was open to professional kickboxers, amateur kickboxers and people who just want a hard core workout. As an added benefit for fighters who attended the camp there were sparring sessions, and based on the results, one professional fighter was guaranteed a contract to fight in a future W5 tournament. The fighter who received the guaranteed contract was Markus Ehrenhofer from Vienna, Austria.

=== World version W5 in 2017 ===
Already the year has seen two tournaments take place. In February W5 held its annual W5 KITEK event in Moscow, Russia. The event was highly received with Vlad Tuinov once again showing he is the man to beat at 72.5kg with his brutal KO of Ali Cakir. The highlight of the night saw legendary fighter Giorgio Petrosyan defeat Artem Pashporin by unanimous decision to win W5's World Championship Title at 71kg. On April 8 W5 held their second event of the year in Dubrovnik, Croatia. It was a smaller event than usual for W5 with only 6 fights on the card, however the highlight of the night was Milan "Minci" Pales KO of Luka Tomic and Vlad "Diamond" Tuinov's defeat of Massaro Glunder in the main event to add W5's 72.5kg Intercontinental title to his 71kg W5 European title. With 2017 not yet over W5 plans on holding four more events. There was also a Summer Boot Camp held from August 4-14 in Novi Sad, Serbia, where W5 organized some of the top trainers and fighters to come take part. In addition all fighters who attended took part in sparring with the chance for one fighter to sign a contract to fight in a future W5 tournament. Also on the card for 2017 are the events in Koper, Slovenia on September 16, November 11 in Kosice, Slovakia, and the final tournament of the year on December 22, in Split, Croatia.

On September 16 at W5's "Legends Collide, in Koper, Slovenia, all eyes were on Andrej "AK-47" Kedves as he fought for his 6th straight victory at W5 events. With his victory he will finally get his title fight in Kosice, Slovakia on November 11. Also, of note was Vlad's dominant performance over the tough-as-nails Rhassan Muhareb with a 4th Rd. KO by liver punch. Vlad successfully defended is 71kg W5 European Title. In the final bout, Slovenian legend, Miran "Slovenian Rocky" Fabjan defeated Bosnia and Herzegovinian legend Dzevad "BH Machine" Poturk by unanimous decision. Miran dominated the three rounds making the decision quite easy.

For the rest of the year, W5 has one more events planned. November 11 will reunite W5 and Rebuy Stars for a continuation of their hit series "Fortune Favors the Brave". The event will be the official grand opening of Rebuy Stars newest casino in Kosice, Slovakia. Andrej "AK-47" Kedves is expected to have his shot at a title on this date. Ondrej Hutnik, Miran Fabjan, and Vladimir Idranyi are all expected to be on the card.

=== World Version W5 in 2018 ===
W5 has started working on their plans for 2018. They are expected to hold up to 12 tournaments next year, which will be the most in their 10 year history. Plans include a fight early on in the Netherlands, with later fights being held in the United States, Russia, Austria, Slovakia, Slovenia and Croatia.

== Competition rules of the W5 ==
=== W5 Fighter Series ===
Over the years W5 has taken the best rules from different sports and created their own set of rules. W5 rules are to be followed under the banner of "Championship of Five Continents." The main principle behind W5's rules is to create a transparent guideline to how fighter's are selected. In order to determine the strongest athletes, fighters must go through a series of W5 fights throughout the year. If their performance is deemed high enough a fighter has the chance to fight for a W5 world title in the final tournament. Since 2014 many tournaments have been called "W5 Grand Prix" which also includes name of the city where the event was organized in and the slogan which the tournament is held under (e.g W5 Grand Prix Vienna Winner's Energy).

=== Rounds ===
Regular fights are three rounds of three minutes each. If the score is tied at the end of the third round the supervising judge may award an extra round to determine the winner. If an extra round is awarded the scores of the previous three rounds are voided and only the result of the fourth round will be considered. Title fights, which include W5 World Champion, W5 Intercontinental Champion, and W5 European Champion are five rounds. The break between rounds is one minute.

=== Scoring system ===
W5 uses the standard 10 point scoring system. There are three judges that score each bout. A supervisor oversees the judging and makes all final decisions where one is deemed necessary. Round winner gets 10 points, the loser gets nine points or less. A tie for each round is possible.

=== The main rules ===
- NO twisting and/or throwing
- NO clinching longer than one second
- "Backfisting" is allowed
- One punch can be thrown after grabbing/catching an opponent's leg
- Kneeing is allowed
  - One knee is allowed during a clinch
- Three knockdown rule is in effect
- NO hitting below the belt
- NO hitting in the back of the head or spine
- NO elbows
- NO kidney punches

=== Weight categories ===
Male

Super heavyweight : above 235 lb (above 106.8 kg)

Heavyweight : 215.1 - 235 lb (97.8 - 106.8 kg)

Light heavyweight : 195.1 - 215 lb (88.7 - 97.7 kg)

Super cruiserweight : 186.1 - 195 lb (84.6 - 88.6 kg)

Cruiserweight : 179.1 - 186 lb (81.5 - 84.5 kg)

Light cruiserweight : 172.1 - 179 lb (78.3 - 81.4 kg)

Super middleweight : 165.1 - 172 lb (75.1 - 78.2 kg)

Middleweight : 159.1 - 165 lb (72.4 - 75 kg)

Light middleweight : 153.1 - 159 lb (69.6 - 72.3 kg)

Super welterweight : 147.1 - 153 lb (66.9 - 69.5 kg)

Welterweight : 142.1 - 147 lb (64.59 - 66.8 kg)

Light welterweight : 137.1 - 142 lb (62.31 - 64.54 kg)

Super lightweight : 132.1 - 137 lb (60.04 - 62.27 kg)

Lightweight : 127.1 - 132 lb (57.77 - 60 kg)

Female weight categories 54, 57, and 65 kg.

=== Ring ===
The W5 ring consists of a 5x5 square that sits inside a circle, where the circle represents infinity and a path of continuous self-development while the square symbolizes equality and justice. Such symbolism is intended to be memorable for the fighters and spectators who identify with W5's values.

=== Gloves and Protective Equipment ===
During the bout and depending on the weight class fighters must use eight- or ten-ounce gloves and mandatory protective gear such as mouth guard and protective bandage for groin.

== Current Champions ==
- (Italy) (Armenia) Giorgio Petrosyan, W5 World champion in up to 71 kg division
- (Brazil) Cosmo Alexandre, W5 World champion, 75 kg
- (Azerbaijan) Alim Nabiyev, W5 European champion, 77 kg
- (Croatia) Agron Preteni, W5 European champion, 85 kg
- (Russia) Alexander Stetsurenko, W5 world champion, 81 kg
- (Netherlands) Massaro Glunder, W5 European champion, 72,5 kg
- (Russia) Julia Berezikova, World Champion, 56 kg
- (Russia) Dzhabar Askerov, European Champion, 71 kg
- (Russia) Sergei Kharitonov, World Champion, over 90 kg
- (Russia) Vladislav Tuinov, European Champion, 71 kg, Intercontinental Champion, 72.5 kg

== Notable participants ==
- (Italy) (Armenia) Giorgio Petrosyan
- (Russia) Artem Pashporin
- (Democratic Republic of the Congo) Chris Ngimbi
- (Switzerland) Shemsi Beqiri
- (Ukraine) Alim Nabiev
- (Romania) Cătălin Moroșanu
- (Romania) Andrei Stoica
- (Bosnia and Herzegovina) Dzevad Poturak
- (Belarus) Ekaterina Vandaryeva

== Current & Past Champions of World Version W5 (* next to a name indicates past champion) ==
- (Russia) Alexei Papin
- (Russia) Alexander Stetsurenko
- (Ukraine) Alim Nabiev
- (Russia) Artem Pashporin
- (Russia) Batu Khasikov (retired in March 2014)
- (Brazil) Cosmo Alexandre
- (Netherlands) Darryl Sichtman
- (Russia) Dmitry Grafov
- (Belarus) Dmitry Shakuta
- (Belarus) Dmitry Varec
- (Russia) Dzhabar Askerov
- (Netherlands) Dzhemi De Vris
- (Italy) (Armenia) Giorgio Petrosyan
- (Russia) Julia Berezikova
- (Russia) Konstantin Serebrennikov
- (Netherlands) Massaro Glunder
- (Russia) Max Shalnev
- (Greece) *Mike Zambidis
- (Ukraine) Pavel Zhuravlev
- (Ukraine) Roman Mailov
- (Slovakia) Rudolf Durica
- (Russia) Sergei Kharitonov
- (Suriname) , (Netherlands) Sergio Wielzen
- (Slovakia) Vladimír Moravčík
- (Russia) Vlad Tuinov
- (Belarus) Yury Zhukovsky
