= Yohan Lidon =

French Muay Thai kickboxer

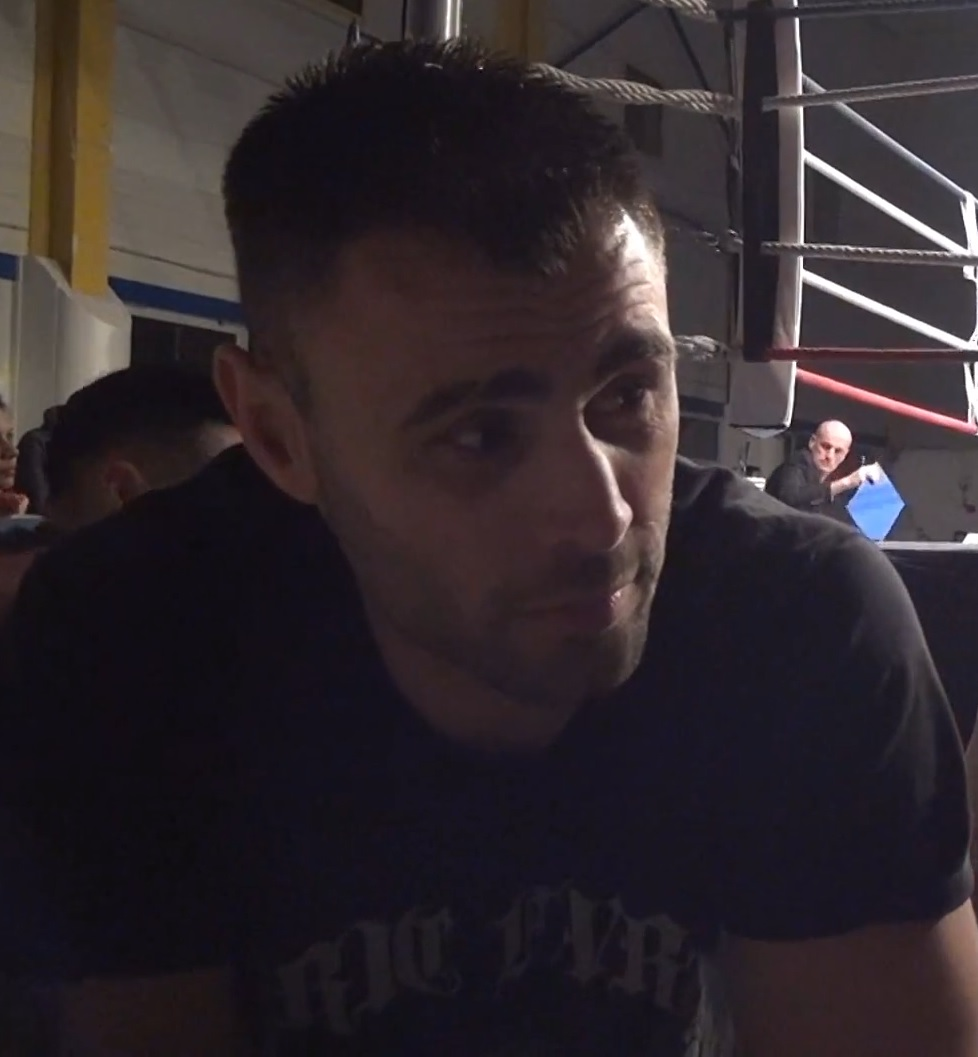
- Yohan Lidon
- Born: March 7, 1983 (age 43)
- Nationality: French
- Height: 1.80 m (5 ft 11 in)
- Weight: 75.0 kg (165.3 lb; 11.81 st)
- Division: Super Middleweight
- Style: Muay Thai, Kickboxing
- Fighting out of: Lyon - Saint-Priest, France
- Team: Gym boxing St Fons - Team Nasser K.
- Trainer: Nasser Kacem
- Years active: 19 (1998–present)

Kickboxing record
- Total: 147
- Wins: 106
- By knockout: 61
- Losses: 39
- By knockout: 6
- Draws: 1
- No contests: 1
- Last updated on: October 24, 2014

Yohan Lidon (born March 28, 1983) is a French Muay Thai kickboxer. He is a 3-time world champion in Muay Thai and kickboxing - including being the first ever It's Showtime 73MAX world champion.

As of July 2021, he is the #9 ranked welterweight in the world by Combat Press.

== Biography and career ==
Yohan Lidon was born on 7 March 1983. He started practicing muay thai at the age of 15. Lidon resides in Lyon, France and trains at Gym boxing St-Fons in Lyon, Saint-Fons.

He faced Eakpracha Meenayotin at Thai Fight: Lyon on September 19, 2012 in Lyon, France and lost via decision after three rounds.

He beat Corrado Zanchi by second-round TKO at the A1 World Combat Cup on November 20, 2012.

Kicking off 2013, he lost a close decision his rubber match with Karim Ghajji in the semi-finals of a 72.5 kg four-man tournament at La Nuit des Titans on February 2, 2013 in Tours, France.

Lidon then beat Steve Moxon by way of split decision for the A1 World Middleweight (−73 kg/160 lb) title in Melbourne, Australia on February 22, 2013.

A rematch between Lidon and Yodsanklai Fairtex took place at Warriors Night in Levallois, France on March 2, 2013. Lidon lost via decision after five rounds.

He scored a second-round KO win over Igor Danis at La Ligue des Gladiateurs is Paris, France on January 25, 2014.

He lost to John Wayne Parr by decision at Boonchu Cup: Caged Muay Thai 4 in Gold Coast, Australia on March 1, 2014.

He lost to Bernueng TopKing Boxing on points at Warriors Night 3 on April 4, 2014.

He challenged Alex Tobiasson Harris in a fight for the WMC World Super Middleweight (-76.2 kg/168 lb) Championship at Monte Carlo Fighting Masters 2014 in Monte Carlo, Monaco on June 14, 2014, losing a unanimous decision.

On May 19, 2016 Yohan Lidon took Round 4 knockout victory (left head kick) over Armenian-Dutch Karapet Karapetyan and became a new World Kickboxing Network (WKN) super middleweight (oriental rules) world champion at Dark Fights 2 event in Paris, France. The knockout itself reportedly scored L'Équipe 21 KO of the year. On August 4, 2016 he defended his belt taking a unanimous decision over Danijel Solaja from Germany in the main event of Fight Night Saint Tropez.

On May 4, 2017 Lidon defeated Patrik Vidakovics of Hungary by unanimous decision making the second defense of WKN World super middleweight title in the main event of Dubai Fight, in Dubai, UAE.

On May 20, 2017 Lidon defeated Djibril Ehouo of France by unanimous decision in the main event of Dark Fights: Capital Fights 2 in Paris, France.

On June 10, 2017 Lidon faced a unanimous decision defeat against Yoann Kongolo of Switzerland in the headline bout of Glory 42 Super Fight Series in Paris, France.

Lidon was expected to fight Florian Kroger of Germany in the third defense of WKN World super middleweight title in the main event of Fight Night Saint Tropez V on August 4, 2017, in St Tropez, France.

In 2012, he took 3rd place at the 14th World Carp Championship at Lake Bolsena, Italy.

== Doping suspension ==
Lidon failed drug tests in 2016 prior to back-to-back events La Nuit Des Challenges 16 and Nuit des Champions, and was issued with a 6-month suspension after tests on samples provided indicated a violation of France rules regarding prohibited substances (heptaminol) for competitive athletes.

== Titles and achievements ==
=== Muay Thai ===
- World Muaythai Council
  - 2016 WMC World Super Middleweight (-79 kg) Champion
- World Boxing Council Muay Thai
  - 2009 WBC Muay Thai World Middleweight (160 lb/72.575 kg) Champion (One defense)
- WKA
  - WKA World Muay Thai Champion
- 2 times French Muay Thai Champion

=== Kickboxing ===
- International Sport Karate Association
  - 2024 ISKA Oriental rules World Light Heavyweight (-81.5 kg) Champion
  - 2015 ISKA K-1 World -76.8 kg Champion
- World Kickboxing Network
  - 2022 WKN K-1 Super Light Heavyweight (-85 kg) World Champion (one defense)
  - 2016 WKN Oriental Rules Super Middleweight (175 lb) World Champion (3 Defenses)
- Arena Fight
  - 2019 Arena Fight Middleweight (-80 kg) Kickboxing Champion
- World Association of Kickboxing Organizations
  - 2016 WAKO Pro World K-1 Super Middleweight Champion -78.1 kg.
- It's Showtime
  - 2011 It's Showtime 73MAX World Champion
- F-1 World Max
  - 2010 F-1 World Max Tournament Runner Up
  - 2009 F-1 World Max Tournament Champion
- Steko's Fight Night
  - 2008 Steko's Fight Night Tournament Champion / WKA World Kickboxing Champion (-76 kg)
  - 2007 Steko's Fight Night Tournament Runner Up
- A-1 World Combat
  - 2014 A1 WGP Tournament Champion -75 kg
  - 2013 A1 World Middleweight (−73 kg/160 lb) Championship
  - 2006 A1 World Combat Cup Runner Up
- 3 times French Kickboxing Champion

=== Accomplishments ===
- 2014 BoxeMag Best Francophone Fighter of the Year

== Mixed martial arts record ==
Professional record breakdown
1 match	1 win	0 losses
By knockout	1	0

Res.	Record	Opponent	Method	Event	Date	Round	Time	Location	Notes
Win	1–0	Chatuten Bunchuai	TKO (punches)	Mixed Fight Championship	May 30, 2024	1		Saint-Priest, France	

== Kickboxing and Muay Thai record ==
Kickboxing & Muay Thai record
107 Wins (62 (T)KO's), 39 Losses, 1 Draw
Date	Result	Opponent	Event	Location	Method	Round	Time
2026-12-19		(Switzerland) Nuwimana Leoni	Nuit Des Challenges 25	Saint-Fons, France			
2024-07-27	Loss	(Italy) Massimo Rigamonti	Imperial Fight	Orange, France	Decision	3	3:00
2024-04-20	Win	(Italy) Simone Podesta	DTMS Fight Night 3	Couzeix, France	TKO (Body shot)	5	
2024-02-08	Win	(France) Cyril Benzaquen	Lidon vs Benzaquen	Paris, France	Decision (Split)	5	3:00
Defends the WKN K-1 World -85kg title and wins the ISKA Oriental Rules World -81.5 kg title.
2023-12-02	Win	(Thailand) Phitak	Nuit Des Challenges 22	Saint-Fons, France	KO	2	
2023-04-21	Win	(Italy) Simone Castorina	K1 EVENT 16	Troyes, France	KO	1	
Wins the K-1 Event -84 kg title.
2022-12-03	Win	(Italy) Giuseppe De Domenico	La Nuit des Challenges 21	Saint-Fons, France	Decision	3	3:00
2022-09-22	Win	(Thailand) Jimmy Limpasert	MFC 9	Lyon, France	TKO	1	1:00
Wins WKN World K-1 Super Light Heavyweight (-85 kg) Championship
2022-04-09	Win	(Italy) Flavio Fugamalli	Fight Night One 10	Saint-Etienne, France	Decision	5	3:00
2021-09-30	Win	(Italy) Dolghi Constantin	MFC 8	Roussillon, France	TKO	2	
2020-02-29	Win	(France) Federico Spano	K1 Event 13	France	TKO	2	
2019-12-14	Win	(Georgia (country)) Giorgi Kankava	La Nuit Des Challenges 19	France	Decision (Unanimous)	3	3:00
2019-03-30	NC	(Ukraine) Artur Kyshenko	Arena Fight	France	Disqualification	5	3:00
For the Arena Fight Middleweight Kickboxing Title (-80.000 kg). Originally a UD win for Kyshenko, later ruled a DQ after Kyshenko failed a drug test.
2019-03-30	Loss	(Poland) Kamil Jenel	DSF Kickboxing Challenge 21	Poland	Decision (Unanimous)	5	3:00
2019-12-15	Win	(Thailand) Diesellek TopkingBoxing	La Nuit Des Challenges	France	Decision	3	3:00
2018-10-27	Win	(Slovakia) Vladimír Moravčík	Fight Legend Geneva	Geneva, Switzerland	TKO (Ref. Stop/Right Cross)	1	1:45
Wins the WMC World Super Middleweight (-76 kg) Championship.
2018-08-04	Win	(Switzerland) Yoann Kongolo	Fight Night Saint Tropez 6	Saint-Tropez, France	Decision (Unanimous)	5	3:00
Defends (4) WKN Kickboxing Oriental Rules Super Middleweight World Championship -79.4 kg.
2018-06-22	Win	(France) Karim Benmansour	A1 WGP	Algeria	Decision	5	3:00
Wins A1 World Title
2018-05-03	Win	(Thailand) Avatar Tor.Morsri	MFC 7	France	KO (Right High Kick)	3	
Wins the MFC World (-79 kg) Championship.
2018-04-13	Loss	(Poland) Kamil Ruta	DSF Kickboxing Challenge 14	Poland	Decision (Unanimous)	3	3:00
2018-03-09	Win	(Germany) Sergej Braun	DSF Kickboxing Challenge	Poland	KO (Front Kick to the Body)	2	
2017-10-28	Loss	(France) Cedric Doumbe	Glory 47: Lyon	Lyon, France	Decision (unanimous)	3	3:00
2017-08-04	Win	(Germany) Florian Kroger	Fight Night Saint-Tropez 5	France	KO (Right High Kick)	4	
Defends (3) WKN Kickboxing Oriental Rules Super Middleweight World Championship -79.4 kg.
2017-06-10	Loss	(Switzerland) Yoann Kongolo	Glory 42: Paris	Paris, France	Decision (unanimous)	3	3:00
2017-05-20	Win	(France) Djibril Ehouo	Capital Fights 2	Paris, France	Decision (unanimous)	5	3:00
2017-05-04	Win	(Hungary) Patrik Vidakovics	Dubai Fight	Dubai, UAE	Decision	5	3:00
Defends (2) WKN Kickboxing Oriental Rules Super Middleweight World Championship -79.4 kg.
2016-11-19	Loss	(Ukraine) Alim Nabiev	Nuit des Champions 2016	Marseille, France	Decision (unanimous)	5	3:00
For the WMC World Light Heavyweight (-79 kg) Championship. Lidon fails another drug test.
2016-10-22	NC	(Italy) Gianmarco Pozzi	La Nuit Des Challenges 16	France	No contest	1	
Originally a KO win for Lidon, later ruled a NC after Lidon failed a drug test.
2016-08-04	Win	(Germany) Danijel Solaja	Fight Night Saint Tropez 4	France	Decision	5	3:00
Defends WKN Kickboxing Oriental Rules Super Middleweight World Championship -79.4 kg.
2016-06-24	Win	(Russia) Datsi Datsiev	Monte Carlo Fighting Masters series	Morocco	Decision	5	3:00
Wins WAKO Pro World K-1 Rules Super Middleweight Title -78.1 kg.
2016-05-19	Win	(Armenia) Karapet Karapetyan	CAPITAL FIGHTS	France	KO (Highkick)	4	
Wins WKN Kickboxing Oriental Rules Super Middleweight World Championship -79.4 kg.
2016-03-06	Win	(Thailand) Panom TopkingBoxing	MFC4	France	Decision	5	3:00
Wins the WMC World Super Middleweight (-76 kg) Championship.
2016-01-23	Win	(England) Ben Hodge	MFC3	France	Decision	5	3:00
2015-10-24	Win	(Belgium) Alka Matewa	La Nuit des Challenges 14	Saint-Fons, France	Decision	5	3:00
Wins the I.S.K.A. K1 Rules World -76.8 kg Title.
2015-08-04	Win	(Brazil) Jonatan Oliveira	Fight Night Saint-Tropez	Saint Tropez, France	TKO	3	3:00
2015-07-04	Win	(Thailand) Berneung Topkingboxing	MFC 2	France	TKO	4	
2015-06-12	Win	(Portugal) Diogo Calado	Strike Fight	France	Decision (split)	5	3:00
2015-04-25	Loss	(Slovakia) Vladimír Moravčík	Gala Night Thaiboxing/ Enfusion Live 28	Žilina, Slovakia	Decision		
2015-03-30	Win	(Australia) Michael Badato	Caged Muay Thai 6	Crestmead Australia	Decision	3	
2014-12-06	Loss	(Australia) Michael Badato	Caged Muay Thai 5	Crestmead Australia	KO	3	
2014-10-23	Win	(France) Cedric Doumbe	A1 Grand Prix Tournament, final	Lyon, France	Decision	3	3:00
Wins the A1 Grand Prix Tournament (75 kg).
2014-10-23	Win	(France) Samy Sana	A1 Grand Prix Tournament, semifinal	Lyon, France	Decision	3	3:00
2014-09-20	Win	(Thailand) Jaochalam Sitkanokgym	Nuit des Challenges 13	Lyon, France	KO	1	
2014-07-26	Win	(Italy) Rosario Presti	La Nuit des Gladiateurs 13	Marseille, France	Decision (unanimous)	3	3:00
2014-06-27	Win	(Brazil) Cosmo Alexandre	Strikefight	Lyon, France	Decision (unanimous)	3	3:00
2014-06-14	Loss	(Sweden) Alex Tobiasson Harris	Monte Carlo Fighting Masters 2014	Monte Carlo, Monaco	Decision (unanimous)	5	3:00
For the WMC World Super Middleweight (-76.2 kg/168 lb) Championship.
2014-04-04	Loss	(Thailand) Berneung Topkingboxing	Warriors Night 3	Paris, France	Decision	5	3:00
2014-03-01	Loss	(Australia) John Wayne Parr	Boonchu Cup: Caged Muay Thai 4	Gold Coast, Australia	Decision	5	3:00
2014-01-25	Win	(Slovakia) Igor Danis	La Ligue des Gladiateurs	Paris, France	KO	2	
2013-11-14	Loss	(England) Thomas Carpenter	Warriors Night	Paris, France	Decision	5	3:00
2013-09-21	Loss	(England) Ben Hodge	LA NUIT DES CHALLENGES 12	Lyon, Saint-Fons, France	TKO (Doctor Stoppage)	4	3:00
Fight was for the WMC World Super Middleweight (-76.2 kg/168 lb) Championship.
2013-03-02	Loss	(Thailand) Yodsanklai Fairtex	Warriors Night	Levallois, France	Decision (unanimous)	5	3:00
2013-02-22	Win	(Australia) Steve Moxon	A1 World Combat Cup	Melbourne, Australia	Decision (split)	5	3:00
Wins the A1 World Middleweight (−73kg/160lb) Championship.
2013-02-02	Loss	(Morocco) Karim Ghajji	La Nuit des Titans, Semi Finals	Tours, France	Decision	3	3:00
2012-11-20	Win	(Italy) Corrado Zanchi	A1 World Combat Cup	Lyon, France	TKO (punches)	2	
2012-09-19	Loss	(Thailand) Aikpracha Meenayothin	Thai Fight: Lyon	Lyon, France	Decision	3	3:00
2012-06-14	Loss	(Thailand) Dernchonlek Sor. Sor. Niyom	Best of Siam	Paris, France	Decision	5	3:00
2012-06-02	Win	(Thailand) Suadao	La Nuit des Challenges 11	Lyon, Saint-Fons, France	KO (Right Hook)	1	
2012-01-28	Loss	(Morocco) L'houcine Ouzgni	It's Showtime 2012 in Leeuwarden	Leeuwarden, Netherlands	Decision (unanimous)	5	3:00
Loses It's Showtime 73MAX World title -73 kg.
2011-12-07	Win	(France) Gregory Choplin	A1 WCC Lyon	Lyon, France	TKO (Doctor Stoppage)	4	
Retains WBC World Muaythai Middleweight title (-72.500 kg).
2011-11-06	Loss	(Slovakia) Vladimir Moravcik	Muay Thai Premier League: Round 3	The Hague, Netherlands	Decision (Unanimous)	5	3:00
2011-08-07	Win	(Japan) Akihiro Gono	Thai Fight Extreme	Ariake Coliseum, Japan	Decision	3	3:00
2011-06-04	Win	(Thailand) Kongjak Sor Tuantong	La Nuit des Challenges 10	Lyon, Saint-Fons, France	Decision	5	3:00
2011-05-14	Win	(Armenia) Marat Grigorian	It's Showtime 2011 Lyon	Lyon, France	Decision (5-0)	5	3:00
Wins inaugural It's Showtime 73MAX World title -73 kg.
2010-12-18	Win	(Canada) Adil Abbas	La Nuit des Challenges 9	Lyon, France	KO	1	
2010-12-05	Loss	(Thailand) Jaochalam Sitkanokgym	Kings Cup Challenge	Bangkok, Thailand	Decision	5	3:00
2010-09-25	Loss	(Morocco) Karim Ghajji	F-1 World MAX 2010 Final	Meyreuil, France	Decision	3	2:00
Fight was for F-1 World MAX Tournament title.
2010-09-25	Win	(France) Francis Tavares	F-1 World MAX 2010 Semi Final	Meyreuil, France	Decision	3	2:00
2010-08-29	Loss	(Thailand) Kongjak Sor Tuantong	TV7	Bangkok, Thailand	TKO	4	
2010-06-05	Win	(Thailand) Diesellek TopkingBoxing	La nuit des Challenges 8	Lyon, Saint-Fons, France	Decision	5	3:00
2010-03-25	Win	(Thailand) Berneung Topkingboxing	Planet Battle	Hong-Kong, China	Decision	5	3:00
2010-02-13	Win	(Spain) Manzi Pauwels	Boxe-Thai Guinea Tournament 2	Malabo, Equatorial Guinea	KO	4	
2010-02-06	Loss	(Belarus) Dmitry Valent	UKC France MAX 2010	Dijon, France	Decision	5	3:00
Fight was for WKN Muaythai World title (-76.200 kg).
2009-11-28	Win	(Thailand) Lamsongkram Chuwattana	A1 Lyon	Lyon, France	KO	1	
Wins WBC World Muaythai Middleweight title (-72.500 kg).
2009-09-26	Win	(France) Jonathan Camara	F-1 World MAX 2009 Final	Meyreuil, France	Decision	3	
Wins F-1 World Max Tournament title.
2009-09-26	Win	(France) Karim Ghajji	F-1 World MAX 2009 Semi Final	Meyreuil, France	Decision	3	
2009-08-30	Win	Joe Spain	TV7	Thailand	KO	2	
2009-06-20	Loss	(Thailand) Naruepol Fairtex	Gala de Boxe Thai : Le Grand Défi	Levallois, France	Decision	5	3:00
2009-05-16	Win	(France) Walid Haddad	Légendes et Guerriers	Toulouse, France	Decision	5	2:00
2009-04-26	Loss	(Thailand) Karuhat Eakchumpon	TV7	Thailand	Decision	5	3:00
2009-03-26	Win	(Thailand) Big Ben Chor Praram 6	Les stars du Ring	Levallois, France	KO	1	
2009-01-31	Loss	(France) Moussa Konaté	La Nuit des Titans	Tours, France	Decision	3	2:00
2008-12-20	Loss	(Thailand) Yodsanklai Fairtex	Boxe-Thai Guinea Tournament Semi Final	Malabo, Equatorial Guinea	TKO (Doctor stop/eye injury)	2	
2008-12-20	Win	(Spain) Manzi Pauwels	Boxe-Thai Guinea Tournament Quarter Final	Malabo, Equatorial Guinea	KO	1	
2008-11-29	Win	(Thailand) Naruepol Fairtex	La Nuit des Champions	Marseilles, France	TKO (Ref. stop/dislocated shoulder)	3	
2008-11-06	Win	(France) Mohamed Bourkhis	Muay Thaï à Levallois	Levallois, France	TKO (Doctor Stoppage)	1	
2008-09-27	Win	(Slovakia) Egon Racz	Steko's Fight Night Final	Munich, Germany			
Wins WKA World Kickboxing title (-76 kg).
2008-09-27	Win	(Turkey) Mohammed Gür	Steko's Fight Night Semi Final	Munich, Germany			
2008-06-??	Win	(Thailand) Ekapon Scorpion Gym	Fairtex Stadium	Pattaya, Thailand	KO	1	
2008-06-07	Loss	(France) Grégory Choplin	La nuit des Challenges 5	Lyon, Saint-Fons, France	Decision (Unanimous)	5	3:00
2008-04-19	Win	(Armenia) Anatoli Hunanyan	World Freefight Challenge 5	Dubrovnik, Croatia	Decision	3	3:00
2008-03-08	Win	(Portugal) José Reis	Steko's Fight Night Final	Munich, Germany	Decision (Unanimous)	3	3:00
Wins S8 WM Fight 4 Men Tournament - WKA World title (-70 kg).
2008-03-08	Win	(Sweden) Elias Daniel	Steko's Fight Night Semi Final	Munich, Germany	KO	1	
2008	Draw	(Cuba) Alfredo Limonta			Decision	3	
2007-12-08	Loss	(England) Steven Wakeling	Steko's Fight Night Final	Munich, Germany	Decision (Split)	4	3:00
Fight was for Kings of Kickboxing WKA World title.
2007-12-08	Win	(Portugal) José Reis	Steko's Fight Night Semi Final	Munich, Germany			
2007-12-08	Win	(Hungary) Istvan Toth	Steko's Fight Night Quarter Final	Munich, Germany	KO	1	
2007-09-15	Loss	(England) Steven Wakeling	Steko's Fight Night Semi Final	Germany	TKO (Doctor Stoppage)	2	
2007-09-08	Loss	(Thailand) Lamsongkram Chuwattana	WBC Muay Thai Presents: World Championship Muay Thai	Gardena, CA	Decision (Unanimous)	5	3:00
Fight was for W.B.C. Muay Thai World Middleweight title.
2007-07-20	Win	(Turkey) Taylan Yesil	A1 Kickbox	Turkey	Decision	3	3:00
2007-06-09	Win	(Croatia) Marko Benzon	La Nuit des Challenges 4	Lyon, Saint-Fons, France	KO	2	
2007-05-26	Win	(Italy) Roberto Cocco	Abano Grand Prix 2007	Abano Terme, Italy	Decision	3	3:00
2007-05-04	Win	(Portugal) Luis Reis	Steko's Fight Night 3rd place		Decision (Unanimous)	3	3:00
2007-05-04	Loss	(Turkey) Ali Gunyar	Steko's Fight Night Semi Final		Decision (Split)	3	3:00
2007-04-20	Loss	(Thailand) Naruepol Fairtex	Gala de Levallois-Perret	Levallois, France	Decision	5	3:00
2007-03-31	Win	(Greece) Alexandros Stavropoulos	Fighting Day 7	Imola, Italy	Decision	3	3:00
2007	Win	Tarares	Gala au Lavandou	Lavandou, France	Decision		
2006-12-17	Loss	(France) Farid Villaume	A1 World Combat Cup Final	Turkey	Decision	5	3:00
2006-11-18	Win	(Thailand) Anuchit Phutthikhwan	France vs Thailand	Levallois, France	Decision	5	3:00
2006-10-21	Win	(France) Jonathan Camara	A-1 Istanbul Semi Final	Istanbul, Turkey	Decision	4	3:00
2006-??-??	Win	(Turkey) Yahooz	A-1 Quarter Final	Turkey	KO	1	
2006-09-21	Win	(Iran) Prince Amir	A-1 Ankara Final 8	Ankara, Turkey	Decision	4	3:00
2006-09-09	Win	(Turkey) Ramazan Beyazkaya	A-1 Antalya First Round	Antalya, Turkey	KO	2	
2006-06-03	Win	(France) Mickael Crosta	La Nuit des Challenges 3	Lyon, Saint-Fons, France	KO	2	
2005-10-22	Loss	(France) Grégory Choplin	La nuit des Superfights II	Villebon, France	Decision (Unanimous)	5	3:00
2005-09-30	Loss	(Belarus) Dmitry Shakuta	Kings of Muaythai: Belarus vs Europe	Minsk, Belarus	Decision	5	3:00
2005-09-09	Win	(Greece) Alex "The Greek"	KO Fight Night	Fermignano, Italy	Decision		
2005-05-14	Win	(France) Nordine Hammoumi	French Championship 2005 Class A, Final	Paris, France	Decision (Unanimous)	5	
Wins French Muay Thai Championship 2005 Class A title (-75 kg).
2005-03-26	Win	(France) Mickael Edouard	French Championship 2005 Class A, Semi Final	Paris, France	KO	1	
2005-01-15	Win	(France) Mickael Crosta	French Championship 2005 Class A, Quarter Final	Paris, France	Decision (Split)	5	
2004-04-24	Win	(France) Wallid Haddad	Impacts Bordeaux	Bordeaux, France	KO	2	
2004-02-20	Loss	(France) Majid Kazam	French Championship 2004 Class B, Semi Final	Paris, France	TKO	4	
2003	Win	(France)	French Championship 2003, Final	Paris, France			
Wins French Muay Thai Championship 2003 Class B title (-75 kg).
2003-02-22	Win	(France) Wilfrid Cupit	French Championship 2003, Semi Final	Paris, France	Decision	4	3:00
2002-08-03	Win	(Italy) Andrea Brigliadori	Best of the Best 1	Jesolo, Italy	Decision		
Legend: Win Loss Draw/No contest Notes

== See also ==
- List of male kickboxers
