= Armen Petrosyan (kickboxer) =

Armenian-Italian kickboxer

- Born: November 6, 1986 (age 39); Yerevan, Armenian SSR, Soviet Union
- Native name: Արմեն Պետրոսյան
- Nationality: Italian
- Height: 1.80 m (5 ft 11 in)
- Weight: 70 kg (154 lb; 11 st 0 lb)
- Division: Middleweight
- Style: Kickboxing, Muay Thai
- Stance: Orthodox
- Fighting out of: Gorizia, Italy
- Team: Satori Gladiatorium Nemesis
- Trainer: Alfio Romanut
- Years active: 2002–present

Kickboxing record
- Total: 94
- Wins: 70
- By knockout: 27
- Losses: 23
- By knockout: 2
- Draws: 1

Other information
- Notable relatives: Giorgio Petrosyan (brother)
- Last updated on: November 6, 2022

Armen Petrosyan (Armenian: Արմեն Պետրոսյան, born November 6, 1986) is an Armenian-born Italian kickboxer who competes in the middleweight division. An aggressive fighter, Petrosyan began training in Muay Thai after moving to Italy from Armenia. Petrosyan and his brother Giorgio Petrosyan were put under contract with Oktagon management, he became a two-time Italian champion and a European titleist before arriving on the world stage in 2010 when he took back-to-back wins over Vuyisile Colossa and Dzhabar Askerov and later appeared as a competitor on the Enfusion reality television show. In March 2013, he won the eight-man Haarlem Fight Night IV tournament in the Netherlands to be crowned the WMTA World Super Welterweight Champion.

== Early life ==
Armen Petrosyan was born in Yerevan, Armenian SSR, Soviet Union (now Armenia) to Armenian parents and moved to Gorizia, Italy, at the age of thirteen with his mother, Karine, and sister, Lianna, joining up with his father, Andranik, and older brothers Giorgio and Stepan who had moved to the country a year earlier. He is a naturalized Italian citizen.

== Career ==
Petrosyan rose to prominence by becoming the World Professional Kickboxing Council (WPKC) Italian Champion in 2006 and the Muay Thai Association (MTA) European Champion in 2007. On November 16, 2008, he competed in the Dodge Trophy 2008 at 73 kg/161 lb in Ulm, Germany, losing to Vladimír Moravčík by knockout in the final.

He defeated Abdallah Mabel at the Ring Rules event in Milan, Italy, on January 30, 2009, a win that earned him a place on the Oktagon presents: It's Showtime 2009 card held on March 14, 2009, where he beat Arnaldo Silva via unanimous decision. Just over a month later, on April 24, 2009, in Trieste, Italy, Petrosyan faced Mauro Serra for the MTA Italian -70 kg/154 lb belt. He scored a knockdown early in round one with a vicious right hook before finishing his opponent off with a barrage of punches soon after to win his second national title. He would lose the title later that year when he dropped a decision at the hands of Carlo DiPaula. Petrosyan ended the year by facing one of Thailand's top middleweights in Saiyok Pumpanmuang at Janus Fight Night: Thai Boxe Last Challenge on November 7, 2009, in Padua, Italy, where he lost by unanimous decision after a three round affair.

At the beginning of 2010, Petrosyan moved up the rankings with back-to-back wins over veteran competition. After outpointing Vuyisile Colossa in Ko Samui, Thailand, on January 20, 2010, he took another points win over Dzhabar Askerov at Oktagon presents: It's Showtime 2010 in Milan on March 13, 2010. He then lost a decision to Marco Piqué in Palermo, Italy, on June 26, 2010 before going on to take part in the first season of the Enfusion reality television show in Ko Samui. He made it to the semi-finals which took place on July 10, 2010, in Lisbon, Portugal, where he faced Pajonsuk SuperPro Samui. Both men were deducted a point by referee Joop Ubeda, Pajonsuk for using his patented throws (illegal under Oriental rules) in round two and Petrosyan for unknown reasons (possibly for clinching or a perceived lack of respect for the referee) in the third, and the bout went into an extension round after ending in a draw. While Petrosyan attacked with punches in the fourth stanza, it was Pajonsuk's body kicks which scored highest as the Thai took the judges' decision. He rebounded with a unanimous decision victory over Leroy Kaestner at Janus Fight Night 2010 in Padua on December 4, 2010.

After a decision win over Miodrag Olar at Thai Boxe Mania in Turin, Italy, on January 29, 2011, brought his winning streak to two, Petrosyan was matched up with Yoshihiro Sato, who his brother Giorgio had defeated in the K-1 World MAX 2010 Tournament final five months earlier. Going down as the co-main event of Oktagon 2011 in Milan on March 12, 2011, both men traded heavy shots in the first round but Petrosyan began to pull away in the second by utilizing sweeps. Much of round three was fought in the clinch and, although Sato landed some solid knees, Petrosyan was given a unanimous decision win on the judges' scorecards. With this win, he jumped from #25 to #15 in the world middleweight rankings. He was unable to keep his momentum going, however, as he fought to a draw with Warren Stevelmans in his next outing in Rome, Italy, on June 11, 2011. Despite this minor set-back, he was still able to break the top ten in the world rankings, coming in at #9.

Petrosyan was then invited to compete in the Fight Code Dragon Series, a sixteen-man -72.5 kg/160 lb tournament held throughout Europe over the course of 2011, and he was entered into the competition at the quarter-final stage against eventual champion Yuri Bessmertny. The pair first met in Marseille, France, on October 15, 2011, with Bessmertny coming away with a controversial split decision win. However, it later emerged that the French sporting commission had not allowed the Fight Code promotion's complete rule set just hours before the event and so a rematch was set for Geneva, Switzerland, on November 26, 2011. Petrosyan came out aggressive in round one but was caught with a counter punch and knocked down. After beating the referee's count, he kept up the aggression and was hit with a vicious right hook from the Belarusian, this time knocking him out. With these two consecutive losses, Petrosyan dropped out of the top ten rankings.

He was able to bounce back with a dominant TKO of Djimé Coulibaly at the Yokkao Extreme 2012 supercard in Milan on January 21, 2012, dropping the Frenchman a total of four times in the first two rounds and forcing a referee stoppage. After almost a year out of the ring, Petrosyan returned to defeat Marco Della Gaggia on points in Naples, Italy, on December 15, 2012.

On March 24, 2013, Petrosyan defeated three opponents in one night to win the vacant WMTA World Super Welterweight (-69.85 kg/154 lb) Championship at Haarlem Fight Night IV in Haarlem, Netherlands. After stopping Nick Beljaards in the first round of their quarter-final with three knockdowns, he cruised to a decision over Robbie Hagemen in the semis. In the final, he faced Henri van Opstal in match set for five rounds. Petrosyan didn't need that long, however, as he damaged van Opstal with low kicks and throws and caused the Dutchman's trainer Andy Souwer to throw in the towel at the end of the third round.

He was expected to fight Samo Petje in Trieste on July 5, 2013 but the fight seemingly fell through. He defeated Mirko Vorkapić via UD in a rematch at Gorizia Fight Night in Gorizia, Italy, on September 28, 2013 before losing to Alim Nabiev by the same margin at W5 Grand Prix Orel XXII in Oryol, Russia on November 16, 2013.

On January 25, 2014, Petrosyan stopped Davide Cattaneo with a body shot in round one at Ring Wars in Milan. He rematched Alim Nabiev at Legend 3: Pour Homme in Milan on April 5, 2014, again losing UD.

Petrosyan defeated Mohamed Houmer by knock out in round two at Gorizia Fight Night 2 in Gorizia, Italy on May 25, 2014, to win the vacant ISKA Super Welterweight (-70 kg/154 lb) Oriental Rules World Championship. He defended the title against Yasuhiro Kido at Oktagon 2015: 20 Years Edition in Milan, Italy on April 11, 2015, Charles François at VVWS - Venum Victory World Series in Florence, Italy on December 10, 2016, and Amancio Paraschiv at Bellator Kickboxing 8 in Florence, Italy on December 9, 2017.

== Championships and accomplishments ==
=== Kickboxing ===
- Dodge Trophy
  - Dodge Trophy 2008 (-73 kg/161 lb) Runner-up
- Haarlem Fight Night
  - Haarlem Fight Night IV 70 kg/154 lb Tournament Championship
- International Sport Karate Association
  - ISKA Super Welterweight (-70 kg/154 lb) Oriental Rules World Championship (3 title defences)
- Muay Thai Association
  - MTA Italian -70 kg/154 lb Championship
  - MTA European Championship
- World Muay Thai Association
  - WMTA World Super Welterweight (-69.85 kg/154 lb) Championship
- World Professional Kickboxing Council
  - WPKC Italian Muay Thai Championship

== Kickboxing record ==
Kickboxing record
70 wins (27 KOs), 23 losses, 1 draw
Date	Result	Opponent	Event	Location	Method	Round	Time
2023-11-25	Loss	(Spain) Sergio Sanchez	Petrosyan Mania	Milan, Italy	TKO	3	
For the WAKO Pro K-1 World Super Welterweight (69.1kg) Championship.
2022-11-06	Loss	(Romania) Cristian Milea	PetrosyanMania: Petrosyan vs. Milea	Milan, Italy	Decision (Unanimous)	3	3:00
2019-11-16	Loss	(Germany) Enriko Kehl	ONE Championship: Age Of Dragons	Beijing, China	TKO (Knees and Punches)	2	1:55
2019-05-25	Win	(England) Jordan Watson	Oktagon	Italy	KO (Right Cross)	1	2:51
2018-11-23	Loss	(France) Samy Sana	ONE Championship: Conquest of Champions	Philippines	Decision (Unanimous)	3	3:00
2018-07-27	Loss	(Democratic Republic of the Congo) Chris Ngimbi	ONE Championship: Reign of Kings	Philippines	Decision (Split)	3	3:00
2018-01-20	Loss	(China) Yuan Bin	Emei Legend	China	Decision (Unanimous)	3	3:00
2017-12-09	Win	(Romania) Amansio Paraschiv	Bellator Kickboxing 8 at Bellator 187	Florence, Italy	TKO (Middle Kick)	1	
Retains the ISKA Super Welterweight (-70 kg/154 lb) Oriental Rules World Championship.
2017-04-08	Win	(France) Mohamed Houmer	Bellator Kickboxing 5	Turin, Italy	Decision	3	
2016-12-10	Win	(France) Charles François	VVWS - Venum Victory World Series	Florence, Italy	Decision	5	3:00
Retains the ISKA Super Welterweight (-70 kg/154 lb) Oriental Rules World Championship.
2016-06-24	Loss	(Morocco) Youssef Boughanem	Monte Carlo Fighting Masters	Monaco	Decision (Unanimous)	5	3:00
Fight Was For WAKO 71,8kg World Title
2016-04-16	Win	(China) Wang Tengyue	Oktagon 2016: Turin	Turin, Italy	Decision	3	
2016-03-12	Win	(Albania) Ridvan Villasaliu	Superpro Fight Night 7	Basel, Switzerland	TKO	1	3:00
2016-02-06	Loss	(Thailand) Armin Pumpanmuang Windy Sport	Ring War 3	Monza, Italy	Decision	5	3:00
2015-10-24	Win	(Mexico) Luis Castaneda	VVWS	Panama City, Panama	Decision (Unanimous)	3	3:00
2015-09-19	Loss	(Spain) Edye Ruiz	Fight Nights	Basel, Switzerland	Decision	3	3:00
2015-08-01	Win	(Japan) Yasuhiro Kido	Blade FC 2	Tokyo, Japan	Decision (unanimous)	5	3:00
2015-04-11	Win	(Japan) Yasuhiro Kido	Oktagon 2015: 20 Years Edition	Milan, Italy	Decision (unanimous)	5	3:00
Retains the ISKA Super Welterweight (-70 kg/154 lb) Oriental Rules World Championship.
2015-01-24	Win	(France) Joris Bodoignet	Thai Boxe Mania 2015	Turin, Italy	Decision	3	3:00
2014-12-20	Win	(Moldova) Dorel Cristian	KOK World GP 2014 in Chișinău	Chișinău, Moldova	Decision	3	3:00
2014-09-13	Loss	(Ukraine) Dmitro Konstantynov	Top King World Series - 70 kg Tournament, Final 16	Minsk, Belarus	Decision (unanimous)	3	3:00
2014-05-24	Win	(France) Mohamed Houmer	Gorizia Fight Night 2	Gorizia, Italy	KO	2	
Wins the vacant ISKA Super Welterweight (-70 kg/154 lb) Oriental Rules World Championship.
2014-04-05	Loss	(Azerbaijan) Alim Nabiev	Legend 3: Pour Homme	Milan, Italy	Decision (unanimous)	3	3:00
2014-01-25	Win	(Italy) Davide Cattaneo	Ring Wars	Milan, Italy	KO (left uppercut to the body)	1	2:18
2013-11-16	Loss	(Azerbaijan) Alim Nabiev	W5 Grand Prix Orel XXII	Oryol, Russia	Decision (unanimous)	3	3:00
2013-09-28	Win	(Slovenia) Mirko Vorkapić	Gorizia Fight Night	Gorizia, Italy	Decision (unanimous)	3	3:00
2013-03-24	Win	(Netherlands) Henri van Opstal	Haarlem Fight Night IV, Final	Haarlem, Netherlands	TKO (corner stoppage)	3	3:00
Wins the Haarlem Fight Night IV 70 kg/154 lb Tournament Championship and the WMTA World Super Welterweight (-69.85 kg/154 lb) Championship.
2013-03-24	Win	(Netherlands) Robbie Hagemen	Haarlem Fight Night IV, Semi Finals	Haarlem, Netherlands	Decision	3	3:00
2013-03-24	Win	(Netherlands) Nick Beljaards	Haarlem Fight Night IV, Quarter Finals	Haarlem, Netherlands	TKO (referee stoppage)	1	
2012-12-15	Win	(Italy) Marco Della Gaggia	Armenia vs. Italy	Naples, Italy	Decision	3	3:00
2012-01-21	Win	(France) Djimé Coulibaly	Yokkao Extreme 2012	Milan, Italy	TKO (right cross)	2	
2011-11-26	Loss	(Belarus) Yuri Bessmertny	Fight Code Rhinos Series 2011 Part 5, Quarter Finals	Geneva, Switzerland	KO (right hook)	1	
2011-10-15	Loss	(Belarus) Yuri Bessmertny	Fight Code Dragon Series 2011 Part 4, Quarter Finals	Marseille, France	Decision (split)	3	3:00
2011-06-11	Draw	(South Africa) Warren Stevelmans	Kickboxing International	Rome, Italy	Draw	3	3:00
2011-03-12	Win	(Japan) Yoshihiro Sato	Fight Code Dragon Series 2011 Part 2	Milan, Italy	Decision (unanimous)	3	3:00
2011-01-29	Win	(Romania) Miodrag Olar	Thai Boxe Mania	Turin, Italy	Decision	3	3:00
2010-12-04	Win	(Netherlands) Leroy Kaestner	Janus Fight Night 2010	Padua, Italy	Decision (unanimous)	3	3:00
2010-10-23	Win	(Croatia) Luka Tomic	Grand Prix Di Roma 2010	Rome, Italy	Decision (unanimous)	3	3:00
2010-07-10	Loss	(Thailand) Pajonsuk SuperPro Samui	Enfusion 1: Test of the Champions, Semi Finals	Lisbon, Portugal	Extension round decision	4	3:00
2010-06-26	Loss	(Suriname) Marco Piqué	The Shock	Palermo, Italy	Decision	5	3:00
2010-04-10	Win	(Netherlands) Farid Maroun	Shardana K-1	Olbia, Italy			
2010-03-13	Win	(Russia) Dzhabar Askerov	Oktagon presents: It's Showtime 2010	Milan, Italy	Decision	3	3:00
2010-01-00	Win	(Slovenia) Mirko Vorkapić	Enfusion 1: Test of the Champions, Quarter Finals	Ko Samui, Thailand			
2010-01-20	Win	(South Africa) Vuyisile Colossa	Enfusion 1: Test of the Champions, First Round	Ko Samui, Thailand	Decision	3	3:00
2009-11-20	Win	(Croatia) Goran Borović	Ring Rules	Milan, Italy	Decision	3	3:00
2009-11-07	Loss	(Thailand) Saiyok Pumpanmuang	Janus Fight Night: Thai Boxe Last Challenge	Padua, Italy	Decision (unanimous)	3	3:00
2009-00-00	Loss	(Italy) Carlo Di Paola		Italy	Decision	5	2:00
Loses the MTA Italian -70 kg/154 lb Championship.
2009-04-24	Win	(Italy) Mauro Serra		Trieste, Italy	KO (punches)	1	
Wins the MTA Italian -70 kg/154 lb Championship.
2009-03-14	Win	(Portugal) Arnaldo Silva	Oktagon presents: It's Showtime 2009	Milan, Italy	Decision (unanimous)	3	3:00
2009-01-30	Win	(France) Abdallah Mabel	Ring Rules	Milan, Italy			
2008-11-16	Loss	(Slovakia) Vladimír Moravčík	Dodge Trophy 2008, Final	Ulm, Germany	KO	5	
For the Dodge Trophy 2008 (-73 kg/161 lb) Championship.
2008-11-16	Win	(Germany) Ardalan Sheikoleslamie	Dodge Trophy 2008, Quarter Finals	Ulm, Germany	Decision (split)	3	3:00
2008-00-00	Win	(Italy) Alex Galavotti		Italy	KO (punches)	1	
2007-04-05	Win	(Italy) Fabio Siciliani	Trieste Fight Night	Trieste, Italy	KO	4	
2007-00-00	Win	(Italy) Francesco Tadiello		Italy	Decision	3	3:00
2006-06-10	Loss	(Italy) Fabio Corelli	S-1 Muay Thai Middle Europe Tournament, Final	Nova Gorica, Slovenia	Decision	3	3:00
Legend: Win Loss Draw/No contest Notes

== See also ==
- Oktagon management
- Giorgio Petrosyan
