= Cornaredo =

Cornaredo Cornaree (Lombard)
- Comune
- Comune di Cornaredo
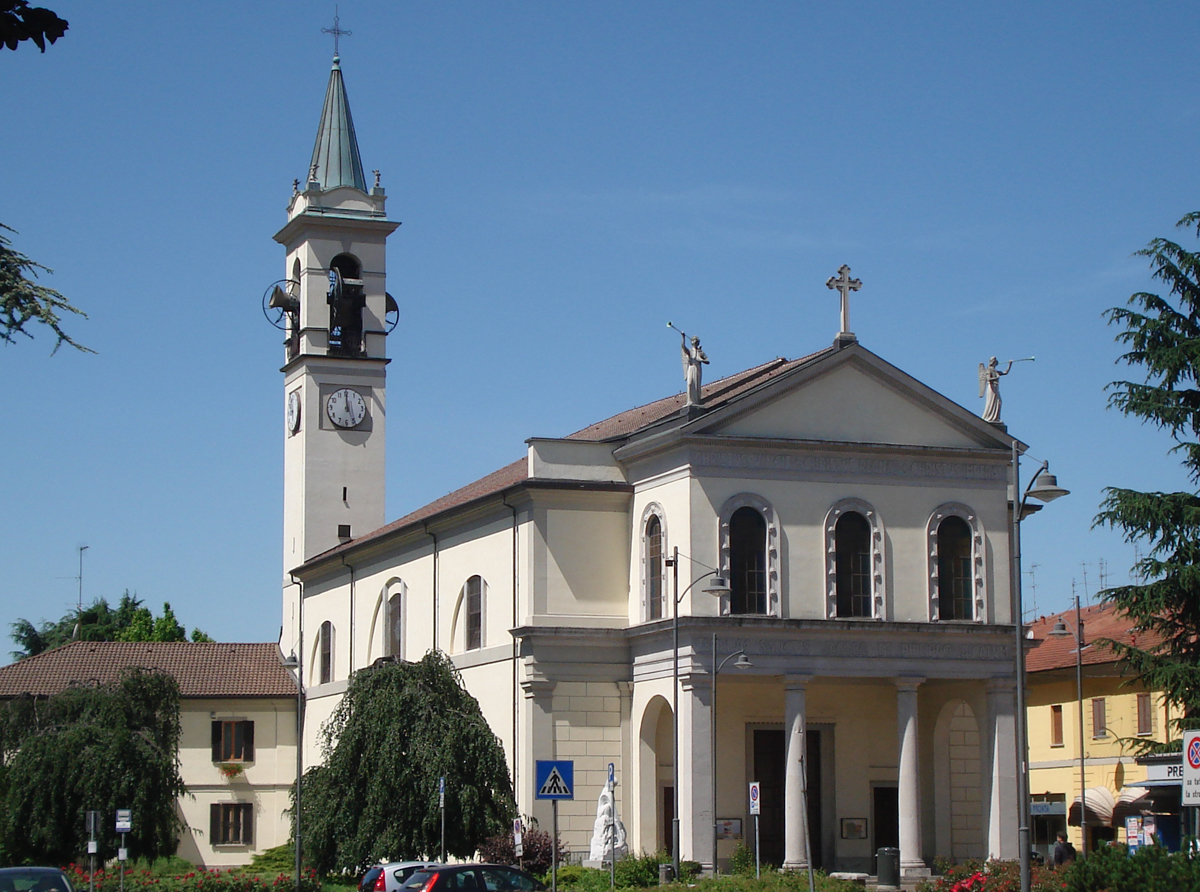

- Coat of arms

- Location within Italy Location within Lombardy
- Coordinates: 45°30′N 9°2′E
- Country: Italy
- Region: Lombardy
- Metropolitan city: Milan (MI)
- Frazioni: San Pietro all'Olmo, Cascina Croce, Cascina Torrette, Favaglie San Rocco

Government
  - Mayor: Yuri Santagostino

Area
  - Total: 13.6 km^{2} (5.3 sq mi)
- Elevation: 145 m (476 ft)

Population (28 February 2014)
  - Total: 20,301
  - Density: 1,490/km^{2} (3,870/sq mi)
- Demonym: Cornaredesi
- Time zone: UTC+1 (CET)
  - Summer (DST): UTC+2 (CEST)
- Postal code: 20010
- Dialing code: 02
- Website: Official website

Cornaredo (Milanese: Cornaree) is a comune (municipality) in the Metropolitan City of Milan in the Italian region Lombardy, located about 11 kilometres (7 mi) northwest of Milan.

Cornaredo borders the following municipalities: Rho, Pregnana Milanese, Settimo Milanese, Bareggio, Cusago.

== Twin towns ==
Cornaredo is twinned with:

- Sarroch, Italy
