= World Muaythai Council =

Sports organization

- Abbreviation: WMC
- Formation: 1995
- Headquarters: Bangkok
- Location: Thailand
- Region served: Worldwide
- Members: National associations
- President: General Chetta Thanajaro
- General Secretary: Dr Sakchye Tapsuwan
- Vice President: Stephan Fox
- Sport Director: Andrew Scott
- Website: Official website

The World Muaythai Council (WMC) is an international professional Muaythai organization. It was set up in 1995 by parliament resolution, and is incorporated by the Royal Thai Government and sanctioned by the Sports Authority of Thailand, under the Ministry of Tourism and Sports. The council has been charged with the responsibility for the expansion of Muaythai worldwide. This involves supporting youth interest and athletes to learn the skills of Muaythai.

== History ==
Set up by parliament resolution, the WMC is incorporated by the Royal Thai Government and sanctioned by the Sports Authority of Thailand, working together with the highest sport authorities of all member countries around the world to regulate all aspects of the art and sport of Muaythai. The inauguration meeting was held in 1995 at an appropriate venue, the United Nation Conference Centre with representatives from 39 countries attended. Presently there are 120 member countries registered with the WMC. The executive board and various committees ranging from technical and rules, refereeing and judging, medical, finance, youth, women, press and public relations, business and legal; all were democratically elected.

In 1996 an MOU was signed between the World Muaythai Council, the Amateur Muaythai Association of Thailand under Royal Patronage and the International Federation of Muaythai Amateur (IFMA) outlining that the 3 organizations will work closely together and support IFMA in getting muaythai into multi-sport events recognized by the IOC as well as GAISF recognition.

General Chetta the president of WMC at the time was Supreme Commander of the Royal Thai Army, later serving as Defence Minister and also the President of the National Olympic Committee of Thailand.

In 1997 a joint effort began between WMC, IFMA and the National Olympic Committee of Thailand to get muaythai recognized by the Olympic Council of Asia. As a result of this muaythai was included in the Asian Games as a demonstration sport then in 1999 the Olympic Council of Asia officially recognized muaythai under IFMA as an official sport.

In 1998 muaythai began the process to become an official recognized sport and to be included into GAISF. In the year 2000 a world meeting took place with WMC, IFMA, the National Olympic Committee of Thailand and Sports Authority of Thailand in which 106 countries participated to vote on the idea of applying for GAISF membership. With a vote of 102 against 4 the world muaythai community decided to apply under the word ‘muaythai’ as the official name of the sport to meet Olympic requirements. Also at this meeting a resolution was reached that IFMA will hold 2 thirds of all executive positions in the WMC worldwide with WMC Thailand keeping their autonomy.

The cooperation continued with annual events held in Thailand to celebrate the Kings, Queens and Prince's birthdays. In 2006, muaythai under IFMA was recognized by GAISF. In 2012 the WMC, IFMA and the Olympic Committee of Thailand started a campaign, muaythai towards highest recognition, applying for recognition to the International Olympic Committee and inclusion in the World Games. In 2014 muaythai got recognized by The World Games then in 2016 the IOC gave provisional recognition to IFMA.

In the year 2019 after muaythai got recognized by the International Olympic Committee, the World Muaythai Council merged with IFMA to represent the professional sector which was witnessed by representatives of over 100 countries, the IOC and the Sports Authority of Thailand to ensure full cooperation with WADA and ITA to protect the clean athletes.

== Royal patronage ==
On August 20, 2014, Muaythai and the World Muaythai Council received official Royal Patronage from His Majesty King Bhumibol Adulyadej of Thailand. All government departments, sport and culture ministries, sport authorities, and all major Muaythai stadiums and promoters were invited to the historic event. PDG. General Saiyud Kerdphol, General Wimon Wongwanich the former President of WMC, General Chetta Thanajaro the current President of WMC, Dr Sakchye Tapsuwan IFMA President and WMC General Secretary, Khun Kajorn Prowsree Vice President of the Amateur Muaythai Association of Thailand under Royal Patronage of His Royal Highness the Crown Prince, Stephan Fox Vice President of WMC and General Secretary of the IFMA, and other notable VIPs were also in attendance. Over 20 representatives from the different embassies in Bangkok also came to witness the ceremony, along with representatives from the United Nations, among many other organizations. Along with Royal Patronage, the WMC logo was changed to include the Royal Insignia of His Majesty.

== Current champions ==
=== Men's divisions ===
Rank	Mini flyweight	Flyweight	Bantamweight	Super bantamweight
C	N/A	N/A	N/A	N/A
1	(Thailand) Netipong Phrommakhot	(Russia) Charak Murtuzaliev	(Thailand) Detrak Kulsena	(Thailand) Buengon Leknakhonsiri
2	(Russia) Ovsep Aslanyan	(Thailand) Chanalert Meenayothin	(Thailand) Kumandoi Petcharoenvit	(Thailand) Kompatak SinbiMuayThai
3	(Thailand) Petchdech Wor Sangbrapai	(Thailand) Satanmuanglek Petchyindee Academy	(Thailand) Ronachai Tor.Ramintra	(Thailand) Ponsane Sor Pumiphat
4	(Thailand) Yodglaa Isaan Tractor	(Thailand) Petch Anuwat Nor Anuwatyim	(Thailand) Saotho Sitchefboontham	(Thailand) Petch Hua Hin Bor Petch Kai Gaew
5	(Thailand) Watcharapon Meenayothin	(Thailand) Peerapat Muayded 789	(Thailand) Petchmuangsiri Oduegdaeng	(Thailand) Kongthoranee Sor.Sommai
6	(Cambodia) Koemrieng Him	(Thailand) Sakaengam Jitmuangnon	(Thailand) Chattrapetch Sor Poonsawat	(Thailand) Chaila Por Lak Boon
7	(Laos) Soulixay Singsavath	(Thailand) Malaynguen Somwang Gai Yang	(Philippines) Ariel Lee Lampacan	(Thailand) Tepthaksin Sor Sonsing
8	(Turkey) Zubeyr Barin	(China) Chenghao Luo	(Peru) Nicolas Young	(Peru) Nicolas Young
9	(Afghanistan) Mashal Islamzai	(Belarus) Mikita Mironchyk	(Russia) Kholmurod Rakhimov	(Russia) Kholmurod Rakhimov
10	(Japan) Tanaka Awa Sport Gym	(Kazakhstan) Bakytzhan Arifkhanov	(Kazakhstan) Yelaman Sayassatov	(Kazakhstan) Yelaman Sayassatov
Rank	Featherweight	Super featherweight	Lightweight	Super lightweight
C	N/A	N/A	(Cyprus) Savvas Michael	N/A
1	(Kazakhstan) Almaz Sarsembekov	(Thailand) Superlek Kiatmuu9	(Russia) Aik Begian	(Ukraine) Igor Liubchenko
2	(Thailand) Kiewpayak Jitmuangnon	(Thailand) Yodtongtai Sor Somai	(Thailand) Gaonar Sor.Jor.Tongprajin	(Russia) Abdulmalik Mugidinov
3	(Thailand) Petchpangan Mor Ratanabantid	(Thailand) Yodkritsada Yutthichonburi	(Thailand) Rodtang Jitmuangnon	(Thailand) Nuenglanlek Jitmuangnon
4	(Thailand) Messi Bangkok Prab	(Thailand) Mongkhon Gaew Sor Somai	(Thailand) Tiradetch Chor Hapayak	(Thailand) Chamuaktong Fightermuaythai
5	(Thailand) Samingdet No.Anuwatgym	(Thailand) Lamnamoonlek Tded99	(Thailand) Sittisak Sengchimyou Yim	(Thailand) Shadow Singmawynn
6	(Thailand) Chalam Parunchai	(Thailand) Thanupetch Wor Sangbrafai	(Thailand) Extra Rongsamak OBJ Udon	(Thailand) Saengmanee Saengmanee Setiyon
7	(Russia) Alexsandr Abramov	(Russia) Alexsandr Abramov	(Thailand) Petchmanee Por Lakboon	(Malaysia) Mohd Fazzatkie Bin Mohd Zaki
8	(Sweden) Nicholas Bryant	(Thailand) Thanonchai Thanakorngym	(Turkey) Sercan Koc	(Philippines) Ryan Jakiri
9	(Ukraine) Vladyslav Mykytas	(France) Arthur Meyer	(Belarus) Daniil Yermolenka	(Thailand) Kittipop Mueangprom
10	(Russia) Tagir Khalilov	(United Kingdom) Johnathan Haggerty	(Vietnam) Nguyễn Trần Duy Nhất	(Afghanistan) Mohammad Yousef Jahangir
Rank	Welterweight	Super welterweight	Middleweight	Super middleweight
C	(France) Bobo Sacko	(Ukraine) Oleksandr Moisa	(France) Jimmy Vienot	(France) Yohan Lidon
1	(Thailand) Thanet Nitutorn	(Thailand) Kunsuk Sitchefboontaam	(Russia) Ilia Balanov	(France) Jimmy Vienot
2	(Thailand) Pongsiri P.K.Saenchaimuaythaigym	(Thailand) Talaytong Sor.Thanaphet	(Thailand) Capitan Petchyindee Academy	(Slovakia) Vladimir Moravcik
3	(Thailand) Yodlekpetch Or Pitisak	(Thailand) Saenpon Petchpachara Academy	(Thailand) Yodwicha Banchamek	(Australia) Toby Smith
4	(France) Rafi Bohic	(Thailand) Bangpleenoi Petchyindee Academy	(Thailand) Superbon Banchamek	(France) Samy Sana
5	(United Kingdom) Liam Harrison	(France) Nacheer Kiatcamton Gym	(Belgium) Youssef Boughanem	(Uzbekistan) Mansurbek Tolipov
6	(Belarus) Dmitry Varats	(Thailand) Sonkaw Sitgamnansue	(Ukraine) Oleh Huta	(Thailand) Kompikart Sor Tawanrung
7	(Hungary) Speth Norbert Attila	(Thailand) Wanchalerm Nuantongsnooker	(Belarus) Andrei Kulebin	(Ukraine) Volodymyr Baryshev
8	(United Kingdom) Charlie Peters	(Russia) Artem Pashporin	(Thailand) Sorgraw Petchyindee Academy	(Spain) Nayanesh Parikh Bumba
9	(Turkey) Erdem Dincer	(United Kingdom) Liam Nolan	(Peru) Gabriel Mazzetti	(Lebanon) Youssef Abboud
10	(Australia) Chadd Collins	(Scotland) George Mann	(United Arab Emirates) Amine El Moatassime	(Sweden) Anton Sjoqvist
Rank	Light heavyweight	Cruiserweight	Heavyweight	Super heavyweight
C	N/A	N/A	N/A	N/A
1	(Thailand) Suthat Bunchit (Rungrawee)	(Russia) Gadzhi Medzhidov	(Ukraine) Oleh Primachov	(Turkey) Bugra Tugay Erdogan
2	(Belarus) Mikita Shostak	(Belarus) Yavheni Vavchok	(Belarus) Dzianis Hanchanarok	(Belgium) Yassine Boughanem
3	(Ukraine) Vasyl Sorokin	(Ukraine) Anatolii Sukhanov	(Czech Republic) Jakub Klauda	(France) Amine Kebir
4	(Canada) Simon Marcus	(Poland) Lukasz Radosv	(Sri Lanka) Weerasinghe Madushanka	(Ukraine) Viktor Torkotluk
5	(Thailand) Tengnueng Sitjaesairoong	(United States) Nathaniel Gaston	(Azerbaijan) Zabit Samedov	(United States) Steve Banks
6	(Australia) Jake Lund	(Spain) Lorenzo Jiminez Martinez	(Russia) Nadir Iskhanov	(Algeria) Chelli Kahin
7	(Russia) Surik Magakian	(Kazakhstan) Alexandr Tsarikov	(Pakistan) Syed Asrar Hussain Sha	(Czech Republic) Michal Reissinger
8	(Netherlands) Nicolai Woltmeijer Bartholin	(Serbia) Milos Cvjeticanin	(France) Brice Guidon	(Poland) Matuesz Duczmal
9	(United Arab Emirates) Ilyas Hbibali	(Algeria) Benkerrov Messaoud	(Dominica) Miguel Fuerte	(Brazil) Vinicius Silva Novaes De Souza
10	(Mexico) Miguel Angel Padilla	(Turkey) Cengaver Taylan Kemik	(Italy) Raffaele Vitale	(Iran) Soleymani Safakhaneh Seyed Kaveh

=== Male intercontinental champions ===
Weight Class	Champion	Date Won
Super Heavyweight	Vacant	–
Heavyweight	Vacant	–
Cruiserweight	Vacant	–
Super Light Heavyweight	(Lebanon) Kassem Daher	April 29, 2017
Light Heavyweight	(United States) Brian McGrath	July 21, 2019
Super Middleweight	(Thailand) Dabmoon Sia Chot Bangsaen	June 16, 2018
Middleweight	(United States) Eddie Abasolo	August 7, 2021
Super Welterweight	(Russia) Magomed Zainukov	December 22, 2018
Welterweight	(Thailand) Pakorn Musipon	December 22, 2018
Super Lightweight	(Italy) Luca Falco	January 26, 2019
Lightweight	(Australia) Jianzhong Tan	May 16, 2007
Super Featherweight	(United Kingdom) Richard Hames	August 20, 2010
Featherweight	Vacant	–
Super Bantamweight	Vacant	–
Bantamweight	Vacant	–
Super Flyweight	Vacant	–
Flyweight	Vacant	–
Light Flyweight	Vacant	–
Mini Flyweight	Vacant	–
Pinweight	Vacant	–

=== Male european champions ===
Weight Class	Champion	Date Won
Super Heavyweight	(Sweden) Simon Ogolla	November 25, 2016
Heavyweight	Vacant	–
Cruiserweight	(Ukraine) Anatoly Sukhanov	November 24, 2018
Super Light Heavyweight	Vacant	–
Light Heavyweight	Vacant	–
Super Middleweight	(Thailand) Dabmoon Sia Chot Bangsaen	June 16, 2018
Middleweight	(United Kingdom) Jake Purdy	March 7, 2020
Super Welterweight	(France) Messie Kubila	December 9, 2025
Welterweight	(France) Thibault Arias	April 13, 2019
Super Lightweight	(France) Matthieu Guevara	May 18, 2017
Lightweight	(France) Yassine Hamlaoui	March 9, 2017
Super Featherweight	(France) Georges Gautherie	April 26, 2018
Featherweight	Vacant	–
Super Bantamweight	(Belgium) Gianny De Leuw	October 3, 2022
Bantamweight	Vacant	–
Super Flyweight	(Italy) Alessio Ancinelli	–

=== Women's divisions ===
Rank	Pinweight	Mini flyweight	Flyweight
C	(Sweden) Camilla Danielsson	N/A	(Thailand) Ticha Wor Por Sukothai RR Kila Korat
1	(Belarus) Alena Liashkevich	(Finland) Tessa Kakkonen	(Vietnam) Bùi Yến Ly
2	(Thailand) Samtiya Bor Buayboonpuet	(Australia) Sze Sze Rowlinson	(Russia) Ekaterina Gurina
3	(Thailand) Pluengwaree Sor Boonchay	(Thailand) FahChiangRai Sor Sakunthong	(Turkey) Funda Alkayis
4	(Finland) Satu Mykkanen	(Thailand) Gulabdam Sit Sor Nor	(Thailand) Ploykiaw Sakchad
5	(Thailand) Tawanchai Dabhanyim	(Thailand) Gaewda Wor Muangpetch	(Thailand) Sommanee Wor Santai
6	(Thailand) Pawida Sor Pongsakon	(Turkey) Gulistan Turan	(Thailand) Rungnapa Por Muangpetch
7	(Ukraine) Yuliia Diachenko	(Thailand) Suphisara Konlak	(Thailand) Petchiruang Wor Woragon
8	(Russia) Vera Negodina	(France) Myriame Djedidi	(Slovakia) Monika Chochlikova
9	(Vietnam) Huỳnh Hà Hữu Hiếu	(Singapore) Cheryl Gwa	(United Kingdom) Lisa Brierly
10	(Ukraine) Yuliia Diachenko	(Ukraine) Hanna Avakova	(Canada) Yumiko Kawano
Rank	Bantamweight	Featherweight	Lightweight
C	(Sweden) Sofia Olofsson	(Thailand) Pecthdabi Mor Krungtep Thonburi	N/A
1	(Russia) Almira Tinchurina	(Russia) Maria Klimova	(Israel) Nili Block
2	(Thailand) Jitti Sor Sor Chiang Mai	(Australia) Yolanda Schmidt	(Sweden) Isa Tidblad
3	(Thailand) Kwanjai Sor Tawanrung	(Canada) Candice Mitchell	(Russia) Ekaterina Vinnikova
4	(Thailand) Wondergirl Fairtex	(Thailand) Sayfa Sor Suparat	(Belarus) Darya Bialkova
5	(United States) Sylvie Petchrungruang	(Thailand) Nongurn Sor Konggrapan	(Thailand) Janjeira Wankrue
6	(United States) Liya Sinbi Muaythai Gym	(Thailand) Jomyutting Sor Engineer Concrete	(Mexico) Mariana Ramirez Sanchez
7	(Philippines) Jenelyn Olsim	(France) Anaelle Angerville	(Belarus) Mariya Valent
8	(United States) Coral Carnicella	(Canada) Taylor McClatchie	(Austria) Nina Scheucher
9	(Thailand) Yadrung "Chomanee" Tehiran	(Czech Republic) Karolina Klusova	(Ukraine) Oleksandra Pecheniuk
10	(Czech Republic) Viktorie Bulinova	(Sweden) Patricia Axling	(Finland) Gia Winberg
Rank	Lightweight	Welterweight	Middleweight
C	(Australia) Claire Baxter	N/A	N/A
1	(Australia) Zoe Putorak	(Turkey) Bediha Taçyıldız	(Finland) Anna Rantanen
2	(United States) Angela Whitley	(Sweden) Emma Stonegård Abrahamsson	(Sweden) Angela Mamic
3	(Sweden) Sara Matsson	(Russia) Anastasiia Nepianidi	(New Zealand) Genah Fabian
4	(Russia) Veronika Profeva	(Kazakhstan) Ilmira Kunakhunova	(Canada) Charmaine Tweet
5	(Sweden) Isa Tidblad	(Belarus) Alexsandra Sitnikova	(Iran) Mahsa Salehpour
6	(Russia) Svetlana Vinnikova	(Kyrgyzstan) Alena Artemova	(Croatia) Helena Jurišić
7	(Sweden) Erica Björnestrand	(Finland) Riikka Järvenpää	(Russia) Anna Tarasava
8	(Colombia) Sabina Mazo	(Mexico) Maria Eugenia Gonzalez Sanquis	(Thailand) Michelle Lanna MT
9	(Turkey) Kübra Akbulut	(Australia) Georgia Smith	(Thailand) Gradai Noi Wor Por Sukhothai
10	(Ukraine) Anita Khodieieva	(Russia) Tatiana Sharkova	(New Zealand) Tersi Rookwood

=== Female intercontinental champions ===
Weight Class	Champion	Date Won
Super Middleweight	Vacant	–
Middleweight	Vacant	–
Super Welterweight	Vacant	–
Welterweight	Vacant	–
Super Lightweight	Vacant	–
Lightweight	Vacant	–
Super Featherweight	Vacant	–
Featherweight	(Germany) Saskia D’Effremo	November 4, 2017
Super Bantamweight	(Italy) Barbara Bontempi	July 16, 2016
Bantamweight	(Thailand) Hongyoklek Liangprasert	February 7, 2019
Super Flyweight	(France) Myriam Djedidi	February 3, 2018
Flyweight	Vacant	
Light Flyweight	Vacant	–
Mini Flyweight	Vacant	–
Pinweight	Vacant	–

=== Female european champions ===
Weight Class	Champion	Date Won
Super Middleweight	Vacant	–
Middleweight	Vacant	–
Super Welterweight	Vacant	–
Welterweight	Vacant	–
Super Lightweight	Vacant	–
Lightweight	(France) Jennifer Colomb	
Super Featherweight	Vacant	–
Featherweight	Vacant	–
Super Bantamweight	Vacant	–
Bantamweight	(France) Myriam Djedidi	February 3, 2018
Super Flyweight	Vacant	–
Flyweight	(Sweden) Sandra Godvik	September 2, 2018
Light Flyweight	Vacant	–
Mini Flyweight	(France) Fanny Ramos	November 24, 2018
Pinweight	Vacant	–

== See also ==
- Rajadamnern Stadium
- Lumpini Stadium
