= Champion of Champions =

Champion of Champions generally refers to a championship tournament in which all participants have won a single event series of the same tournament.

It may also refer to:

- Champion of Champions (horse race), a stakes race annually held in California
- Champion of Champions (snooker), a professional snooker tournament
- Champions of Champions Elite, a martial arts television show focused on Muay Thai
- L'Équipe Champion of Champions, a sporting achievement/personality award presented by the French daily publication L'Équipe
- Orvin – Champion Of Champions, a 2003 musical play by Alan Ayckbourn
- The Champion of Champions, a 1972 film directed by Chia Li
- World Singles Champion of Champions, lawn bowls event

== See also ==
- Campeón de Campeones, a defunct annual Mexican association football competition
- Race of Champions, an international motorsport event
