= John Wayne Parr =

Australian martial artist

- Born: Wayne Gregory Parr; 25 May 1976 (age 50); Australia
- Other names: The Gunslinger; JWP
- Height: 177 cm (5 ft 9 1/2 in)
- Weight: 160 lb (73 kg)
- Division: Middleweight
- Reach: 71 in (180 cm)
- Style: Muay Thai
- Stance: Orthodox
- Fighting out of: Gold Coast, Queensland, Australia
- Team: Boonchu Gym
- Years active: 1987–2022

Professional boxing record
- Total: 14
- Wins: 11
- By knockout: 10
- Losses: 3

Kickboxing record
- Total: 135
- Wins: 99
- By knockout: 46
- Losses: 36

Other information
- Occupation: Muay Thai kickboxer, teacher and gym owner
- Spouse: Angela Rivera-Parr
- Children: Jasmine Parr Jesse James Parr Jemma Parr
- Boxing record from BoxRec
- Mixed martial arts record from Sherdog
- Last updated on: 21 June 2014

John Wayne Parr (born 25 May 1976), also known as JWP, is a retired Australian Muay Thai fighter, kickboxer and boxer, fighting out of Boonchu Gym in Gold Coast, Queensland. He is a former 10-time World Champion, and was the runner up on The Contender Asia.

== Biography ==
=== Early life ===
Parr began training in taekwondo at the age of 11. He competed in the Queensland titles at QE2 Stadium, where he won a silver medal after winning two fights and losing the final in 1988. In 1990, he started kickboxing, training for a few months before having to move to Sydney. In 1991 Parr moved to Richmond, New South Wales. He found a new kickboxing gym and had his first fight aged 14, losing on a split decision. In 1992 the Parr family moved again to Mornington in Victoria. In 1993 at the age of sixteen, his family moved back to Queensland, and Parr began training with Blair Moore. Moore was one of Queensland's premier promoters of Muay Thai at the time.

=== Early career in Australia ===
Parr started participating in professional bouts at the age of 16. Moore trained Parr for 13 fights, with Parr winning an Australian title (63 kg) at the age of 17. Blair helped promote Parr at Jupiters Casino for three fights before he fought for the South Pacific title against Scott Lovelock, winning by 5th-round KO when Parr was 19. During his first career in Australia, he won some regional titles including one from the WKA. At the age of 19, Parr met Richard Vell, the owner of an esteemed Muay Thai restaurant in Australia – Boonchu Thai food. The two developed a father and son relationship, and after a few years together, Vell sponsored Parr to train in Thailand.

=== Career in Thailand ===
In 1996, Parr moved to Thailand and lived in a Muay Thai camp for four years, training in Pattaya and Bangkok. At camp Loomingkwan, he was named "John Wayne Parr" after John Wayne of the Western show Por Monoch Borbud. He competed in 30 fights and winning two world titles. He trained extensively with legendary Thai fighter "Deadly Kisser" Sangtiennoi Sor.Rungroj in this time. During his career in Thailand, he imitated a gunfighter by drawing a gun from his holster at the end of the wai khru before the bout, and this caught the Thai public's fancy. He gained popularity in Thailand, was voted Best Farang Fighter of the year in 1997, fought at Lumpinee Stadium three times, and at his first Thai king's birthday.

=== Second career in Australia ===
In 1999, Parr moved back to Australia to open his own training facility, Boonchu Gym.

He also started participating in traditional boxing bouts. He debuted in boxing on 29 January 1998 against Tim Shannon in a four-round bout, winning by TKO in the second round. On 25 April 1998, he fought against Takayuki Kohiruimaki who would eventually win the K-1 tournament, and won by the unanimous decision. On 19 September, Parr fought Takashi Ito, another Japanese veteran kickboxer, in the joint event of AJKF & MAJKF, and lost by TKO in round 2 due to doctor's stoppage as Parr's head was sliced open via a left elbow strike.

On 24 April 1999, he fought against Kenichi Ogata, the Japanese national shoot boxing champion, winning by KO with left hook in the second round. On 23 May 1999, he participated in the first "X-plosion series" event, which was a famous Australian kickboxing promotion, fighting against Daniel Dawson. Parr won by unanimous decision after five rounds.

On 13 October 2000, he participated in K-1 Queensland 2000, the first K-1 event for him, and fought against Scott Bannan for his ISKA Muay Thai world championship at middleweight. The fight was unusual in that their rivalry had developed on an Australian kickboxing bulletin board. On 5 December, he fought against Orono Por.Muang Ubon for the vacant title of International Muay Thai Federation (IMF) middleweight title in the Thai King's birthday event. He won by unanimous decision after 5 rounds, winning another world title in Muay Thai.

=== Boxing career ===
In 2001, Parr shifted his focus to boxing again. After seven consecutive boxing victories since 1998, he fought against Andriy Khamula for the vacant Australian boxing title at Middleweight on 8 July 2001. He won the championship by TKO in round 10 and got his first boxing title.Next month, on 17 August, he challenged Nader Hamdan for his IBF Pan Pacific Junior middleweight title, but lost by unanimous decision after 12 rounds. On 21 September, he challenged for the vacant Oceanic Boxing Association (OBA) title at Super welterweight against Rasheed Baloch, and won the title by TKO in round 5. On 24 October, he fought against Ian McLeod to defend his Australian national title, but lost by unanimous decision. On 5 December, he participated in the King's Cup tournament in Thailand, and won the tournament.

On 29 November 2019 Parr defeated former world champion Anthony Mundine by split decision with scores of 96–93, 95–93 and 94–95. Following the bout, Parr announced his retirement from combat sports, citing his need for a hip replacement.

=== K-1 ===
On 26 November 2002, Parr participated K-1 Oceania MAX 2002 tournament. He knocked out Shane Chapman with right cross in the semifinal, but was beaten by Mike Zambidis by Majority decision at the tournament final.

In 2004, Parr had his first fight for the K-1 organisation in Japan against Duane Ludwig, winning on points. Parr made the final 8 with his first fight against Buakaw. After three close rounds, the judges scored it a draw, forcing an extension round. After the extension round, Parr lost via split points decision.

In 2005, Parr was invited back for K1 eliminations, beating Shane Chopper Chapman by KO. Magomedov Making the final 8. Parr then fought Albert Kraus, losing on points. Parr also had super fights in the K-1 against Arslan Magomedov, losing after extension, and against Kinami, winning on points.

=== S-1 ===
In 2004, Parr won the S1 Tournament World Champion Title with three wins in one night. Together with this title, he won one million baht (equivalent to around US$33,300), and a trophy from Thaksin Shinawatra.

=== WMC ===
Parr won the vacant title of WMC World Muay Thai Champion with a unanimous victory over Alexandre Cosmo.

=== The Contender Asia finals ===
Much of Parr's fame rose from the Contender Asia reality show. On 12 April 2008, he fought Yodsaenklai in Singapore for The Contender Asia title and US$150,000. The fight was an emotional battle for Parr; just weeks before the contest, his father had been diagnosed with terminal cancer. His wife was also pregnant. Parr recovered from two knockdowns during the fight, but lost by unanimous decision. He eventually fought Yodsaenklai once more, winning the final bout of their trilogy with a hard-fought, but highly controversial decision.

=== Retirement fight ===
On 24 June 2012, Parr fought his retirement fight against K-1 veteran Jordan Tai, fighting full Thai rules in an MMA-style cage with fingerless gloves. At 2:11 of the 4th round he knocked out Jordan Tai with a vicious uppercut. He retired on a four fight winning streak (three of which were by KO) and he retired as the WKBF K-1 World Middleweight Champion. It was Parr's first time fighting inside a cage using 5oz MMA gloves and he has said he enjoyed it more than traditional Muay Thai and would come out of retirement if Buakaw Por. Pramuk agreed to face him in a caged Muay Thai fight.

=== Comeback ===
On 18 January 2013, Parr came out of retirement to sign a three-fight deal with Powerplay Promotions. The first fight was to be against WKA World Middleweight (−72.5 kg/159.8 lb) Oriental title holder Fadi Merza, but Merza pulled out at the last minute and was replaced on the card with Mostafa Abdollahi. Parr defeated Abdollahi by knock out at 1:30 in the 2nd round with a right hook to win Merza's newly vacated belt.

On 6 July 2013, Parr forced two eight counts on Marco Piqué en route to a decision win at Boonchu Cup: Caged Muay Thai 3 on the Gold Coast, Australia.

Parr intended to tryout for the Australia vs. Canada season of The Ultimate Fighter mixed martial arts reality TV show in September 2013 but a minimum of five professional MMA fights was required for candidates and so he was rejected in spite of his kickboxing and Muay Thai credentials.

He was scheduled to have his rubber match with Cosmo Alexandre at Powerplay Promotions 22 in Melbourne, Australia on 8 November 2013. However, Alexandre did not apply for his visa in time and was unable to enter the country and so he was replaced by New Zealand's Brad Riddell who Parr defeated by unanimous decision.

Parr defeated Yohan Lidon by decision at Boonchu Cup: Caged Muay Thai 4 in Gold Coast, Australia on 1 March 2014.

Parr lost the WKA World Middleweight (−72.5 kg/159.8 lb) Oriental Championship when he was knocked out by Toby Smith in the third round at Powerplay Promotions 24 in Melbourne on 21 June 2014. On Saturday 11 June 2016 Parr defeated Pavlos Kaponis at Muay Thai Grand Prix 5 on Saturday, 11 June 2016 in London, England. On Friday 14 October 2016 in Perth, Western Australia, Parr defeated Daniel Dawson by unanimous decision in their third bout at Origins 8 promotion at Herb Graham Rec Centre, Mirrabooka, WA.

Parr was expected to fight Jake Purdy of England in the main event of Caged Muay Thai 10 on 4 August 2017 in Brisbane, Australia, however Purdy pulled out of the fight on two days' notice with a broken toe. Purdy was replaced by Irish kickboxer James Heelan. Parr went on to win this fight by unanimous decision.

=== Bellator Kickboxing ===
In October 2016, Parr signed a three-fight deal with Bellator Kickboxing. His first fight took place on 8 April 2017 in Italy at Bellator Kickboxing 5 against Nando Calzetta. Parr won the fight by knockout in the second round.

In his second outing held in Florence, Italy on 9 December 2017 at Bellator Kickboxing 8, Parr scored the third-round TKO win against Piergiulio Paolucci.

In the third fight on 6 April 2018 in Budapest, Hungary, Parr faced a defeat by decision against Portuguese Eder Lopes.

=== Rizin Fighting Federation ===
After the stint in Bellator, Parr signed with Rizin Fighting Federation and made his promotional debut against Danilo Zanolini at Rizin 18 on 18 August 2019. He lost the fight via split decision.

=== ONE Championship ===
In March 2020, news surfaced that Parr had signed a six-fight contract with ONE Championship. He made his promotional debut against Nieky Holzken at ONE on TNT III on 21 April 2021. He lost the bout via TKO after a head kick dropped him.

On February 17, 2022, news surfaced that Parr was scheduled to face former ONE Lightweight Champion and wushu champion Eduard Folayang at ONE: X on March 26, 2022, in a Muay Thai rules retirement bout. He lost the fight via unanimous decision.

== Outside the ring ==
=== Blessed With Venom ===
A feature-length documentary chronicling Parr's life, Blessed With Venom, was filmed. The film provides an insight into Parr's early years in Thailand where he endured rigorous training in primitive conditions, to the heights of his accomplishments around the world, as well as his family life. The documentary also examines seminal fights in Parr's career.

Parr has also acted in short movies such as The Violent, written by James Richards and Keith Macdonald. It was filmed in Australia and won Best Fight Choreography Short award at an international film festival.

=== Family ===
His wife, Angela Rivera-Parr, daughter, Jasmine Parr, and son, Jesse James Parr, are also fighters. Angela has fought for the WBC Muay Thai title, and won an IAMTF title (International Amateur Muay Thai Federation). Jasmine is an aspiring kickboxer and won the Australian women's flyweight boxing championship in her first bout.

=== Author ===
Parr authored a book on his life called The Fighter - The legendary life of an Australian Champion in 2024.

== Titles ==
=== Muay Thai & kickboxing ===
- World Kickboxing Association (WKA)
  - 2013 WKA World Middleweight (−72.5 kg/159.8 lb) Oriental Championship
  - 2010 WKA Muay Thai World Middleweight Championship 72.5 kg
  - 1994 WKA South Pacific Super Lightweight Champion
  - 1992 WKA Australian Super Lightweight Champion
- World Kickboxing Federation (WKBF)
  - 2011 WKBF K-1 Middleweight World Champion
- World Kickboxing Network (WKN)
  - 2010 WKN Thai boxing World Super welterweight (72.6 kg) Champion
- International Kickboxer Magazine
  - 2008 International Kickboxer Magazine Champion
- World Muaythai Council (WMC)
  - 2008 WMC Contender Asia Runner up
  - 2007 WMC Thai boxing Middleweight World Champion
  - 2001 Kings Cup Tournament Champion
- 1999 Winner Kings Cup
  - 1999 WMTC (now WMC) Australian Jr. Middleweight Champion
  - 1997 Kings Cup Winner
- K-1
  - 2002 K-1 Oceania MAX Tournament runner-up
- International Sport Kickboxing Association
  - 2000 ISKA Muay Thai World Middleweight Champion
- WKBA
  - 2005 WKBA K-1 World Welterweight Champion (defence: 1)
- Onesongchai Promotion
  - 2004 S-1 Muay Thai World Middleweight Tournament Champion
- IMF
  - 2000 IMF Kings Cup Muay Thai World Middleweight Champion

=== Boxing ===
- 2001 Australian Boxing Middleweight Champion

== Awards ==
- 2004 Fighter of the Year by IronLife Magazine
- 2004 Fighter of the year by International Kickboxer Magazine
- 1997 Best Farang Fighter in Thailand

== Fight record ==
Professional kickboxing record
99 wins (45 KOs), 34 losses, 1 draw
Date	Result	Opponent	Event	Location	Method	Round	Time
2022-03-26	Loss	(Philippines) Eduard Folayang	ONE: X	Kallang, Singapore	Decision (unanimous)	3	3:00
2021-04-21	Loss	(Netherlands) Nieky Holzken	ONE on TNT 3	Kallang, Singapore	TKO (head kick)	2	1:23
2019-08-18	Loss	(Brazil) Danilo Zanolini	RIZIN 18	Nagoya, Japan	Decision (split)	3	3:00
2018-04-06	Loss	(Cape Verde) Eder Lopes	Bellator Kickboxing 9	Budapest, Hungary	Decision	3	3:00
2017-12-10	Win	(Italy) Piergiulo Paolucci	Bellator Kickboxing 8: Florence	Florence, Italy	TKO (ref. stoppage)	3	1:50
2017-08-04	Win	(Republic of Ireland) James Heelan	Caged Muay Thai 10	Brisbane, Australia	Decision (unanimous)	5	3:00
2017-04-08	Win	(Italy) Nando Calzetta	Bellator Kickboxing 5	Torino, Italy	KO (head kick)	2	2:59
2016-12-03	Win	(Canada) Matthew Richardson	Boonchu Cup: Caged Muay Thai 9	Gold Coast, Australia	Decision (unanimous) || 5 || 3:00		
2016-10-14	Win	(Australia) Daniel Dawson	Origins 8: Dawson vs JWP III	Perth, Australia	Decision (unanimous)	5	3:00
2016-06-11	Win	(Greece) Pavlos Kaponis	Muay Thai Grand Prix 5	London, United Kingdom	Decision (unanimous)	5	3:00
2016-03-04	Loss	(New Zealand) Brad Riddell	Boonchu Cup: Caged Muay Thai 8	Gold Coast, Australia	Decision (unanimous)	5	3:00
2015-12-05	Win	(Republic of Ireland) Mark Casserly	Boonchu Cup: Caged Muay Thai 7	Gold Coast, Australia	TKO (ref. stoppage)	3	3:00
2015-10-23	Loss	(Brazil) Cosmo Alexandre	Lion Fight 25	Temecula, California, USA	Decision (unanimous)	5	3:00
2015-05-09	Win	(New Zealand) Daniel Kerr	Boonchu Cup: Caged Muay Thai 6	Gold Coast, Australia	TKO (ref. stoppage)	3	2:06
2014-06-21	Loss	(Australia) Toby Smith	Powerplay Promotions 24	Melbourne, Australia	TKO (broken orbital bone)	3	1:58
Loses the WKA World Middleweight (−72.5 kg/159.8 lb) Oriental Championship.
2014-03-01	Win	(France) Yohan Lidon	Boonchu Cup: Caged Muay Thai 4	Gold Coast, Australia	Decision	5	3:00
2013-11-08	Win	(New Zealand) Brad Riddell	Powerplay Promotions 22	Melbourne, Australia	Decision (unanimous)	5	3:00
2013-07-06	Win	(Suriname) Marco Piqué	Boonchu Cup: Caged Muay Thai 3	Gold Coast, Australia	Decision	5	3:00
2013-04-19	Win	(Iran) Mostafa Abdollahi	Pay Back Time 4	Melbourne, Australia	KO (right hook)	2	1:30
Wins the WKA World Middleweight (−72.5 kg/159.8 lb) Oriental Championship.
2012-06-24	Win	(New Zealand) Jordan Tai	Boonchu Cup: Caged Muay Thai	Australia	KO (uppercut)	4	2:11
2011-12-03	Win	(Thailand) Nonsai Sor.Sanyakorn	Evolution 25	Australia	Decision (split)	5	3:00
2011-07-30	Win	(Iran) Mostafa Abdollahi	Capital Punishment 4	Canberra, Australia	TKO (punches)	2	3:00
2011-05-27	Win	(Greece) Mike Zambidis	Payback Time, "The Decider"	Melbourne, Australia	TKO (three knockdowns)	1	2:59
Wins the WKBF K-1 middleweight World Championship.
2010-12-18	Loss	(China) Zhang Kaiyin	Bruce Lee 70th Birthday Celebrations	Shun De, China	Decision (unanimous)	5	3:00
2010-10-17	Win	(Thailand) Yodsanklai Fairtex	Pay Back Time 2, Powerplay Promotions	Melbourne, Australia	Decision (split)	5	3:00
Wins the vacant WKA World middleweight Championship 72.5 kg.
2010-09-11	Loss	(Australia) Bruce Macfie	Evolution 21	Brisbane, Australia	Decision (split)	5	3:00
2010-06-12	Win	(Thailand) Lamsongkram Chuwattana	Muay Thai Warriors	Melbourne, Victoria, Australia	Decision (split)	5	3:00
2010-04-24	Draw	(Australia) Eugene Ekkelboom	Evolution 20	Brisbane, Australia	Decision	5	3:00
The bout was for Ekkelboom's title of WMC World Super middleweight (168 lb / 76.363 kg) Championship.
2010-03-13	Win	(Belarus) Dmitry Valent	Domination 4	Bentley, Australia	Decision (unanimous)	5	3:00
Wins vacant title of WKN Thai boxing World Super welterweight (72.6 kg) Championship.
2009-11-29	Win	(Australia) Eli Madigan	Evolution 19	Brisbane, Australia	Decision (unanimous)	5	3:00
2009-08-29	Loss	(Brazil) Cosmo Alexandre	Evolution 17 Super 8 Tournament Semi-final	Brisbane, Australia	TKO (low kicks)	2	
2009-08-29	Win	(Australia) Jason Scerri	Evolution 17 Super 8 Tournament Quarter-final	Brisbane, Australia	Decision (unanimous)	3	3:00
2009-06-26	Loss	(Thailand) Buakaw Por.Pramuk	Champions of Champions II	Montego Bay, Jamaica	Decision (unanimous)	5	3:00
The bout was for the vacant title of WMC MAD Superwelterweight Championship.
2009-05-08	Win	(Greece) Mike Zambidis	Pay Back Time, Powerplay Promotions	Melbourne, Victoria, Australia	Decision (unanimous)	5	3:00
2009-04-04	Loss	(Thailand) Mardsue Tum	Evolution 16	Brisbane, Australia	Decision (unanimous)	5	3:00
2008-12-06	Win	(United Kingdom) Sean Wright	Evolution 15 "The Contender Qualifier	Brisbane, Australia	TKO	2	3:00
Wins vacant title of International Kickboxer Magazine Championship.
2008-09-16	Win	(Russia) Dzhabar Askerov	Evolution 14 "The Contenders"	Brisbane, Australia	Decision (unanimous)	5	3:00
2008-04-12	Loss	(Thailand) Yodsanklai Fairtex	The Contender Asia Finale	Singapore	Decision (unanimous)	5	3:00
2008-01-20	Win	(Japan) Kozo Takeda	SNKA "Brave Hearts 7"	Bunkyo, Tokyo, Japan	KO (left hook)	4	1:20
Retains title of WKBA World Welterweight Championship (1).
2007-12-01	Win	(Brazil) Cosmo Alexandre	Evolution 12	Brisbane, Australia	Decision (unanimous)	5	3:00
Wins vacant title of WMC World Middleweight (160 lb / 71.575 kg) Championship.
2007–10	Win	(Russia) Dzhabar Askerov	The Contender Asia Episode 14	Singapore	Decision (unanimous)	5	3:00
2007–10	Win	(Switzerland) Zidov Akuma	The Contender Asia Episode 11	Singapore	KO (right cross)	3	1:44
2007–09	Win	(France) Rafik Bakkouri	The Contender Asia Episode 3	Singapore	Decision (unanimous)	5	3:00
2007-07-21	Win	(South Korea) Jun Kim	K-1 Fighting Network KHAN 2007	Seoul, South Korea	Decision (unanimous)	3	3:00
2006-11-25	Win	(Australia) Bruce Macfie	Evolution 9 "Revenge or Repeat"	Gold Coast, Australia	KO		
2006-09-16	Win	(Australia) Soren Monkongtong	Evolution 8 "Final Count Down"	Gold Coast, Australia	KO (right)		
2006-07-28	Win	(Australia) Greg Foley	Jabout presents "Destiny"	Penrith, Australia	Decision (unanimous)		
2006-06-02	Loss	(Thailand) Wanlop Sitpholek	Evolution 7 "Fight for a Cause"	Brisbane, Australia	Decision (split)	5	3:00
2006-04-28	Loss	(Thailand) Oomsin Sitkuanam	SNKA Titans 3rd	Shibuya, Tokyo, Japan	Decision (majority)	5	3:00
2006-03-12	Loss	(United Kingdom) Steven Wakeling	WBC Muay Thai Championships	London, England, UK	Decision (split)	5	3:00
The bout was for the 1st vacant title of WBC Muay Thai World Middleweight (160 lb / 72.575 kg) Championship.
2005-12-10	Loss	(Thailand) Yodsanklai Fairtex	Xplosion 12	Gold Coast, Australia	Decision (unanimous)	5	3:00
The bout was for the 1st vacant title of WBC Muay Thai World Super welterweight (154 lb / 69.853 kg) Championship.
2005-11-25	Win	(Australia) Bruce Macfie	Evolution 6 "Two Tribes Go To War!"	Gold Coast, Australia	Decision	5	3:00
2005-10-12	Win	(Japan) Toshiyuki Kinami	K-1 World MAX 2005 Champions Challenge	Shibuya, Tokyo, Japan	Decision (unanimous)	3	3:00
2005-08-22	Win	(Japan) Kozo Takeda	SNKA "TITANS 2nd"	Shibuya, Tokyo, Japan	KO (right hook)	3	2:24
Wins vacant title of WKBA World Welterweight (70kg) Championship.
2005-07-20	Loss	(Netherlands) Albert Kraus	K-1 World MAX 2005 Final Quarter-final	Yokohama, Kanagawa, Japan	Decision (unanimous)	3	3:00
2005-05-04	Win	(Australia) Shane Chapman	K-1 World MAX 2005 World Tournament Open	Kōtō, Tokyo, Japan	KO (left body shot)	3	2:08
2004-12-18	Loss	(Thailand) Sakmongkol Sithchuchok	K-1 Challenge 2004 Oceania vs World	Gold Coast, Australia	Decision (split)	5 (ex.2)	3:00
2004-11-06	Win	(Thailand) Oomsin Sitkuanam	SNKA&K-1 "Titans 1st"	Kitakyūshū, Fukuoka, Japan	Decision (unanimous)	3	3:00
2004-10-13	Loss	(Russia) Arslan Magomedov	K-1 World MAX 2004 Champions' Challenge	Shibuya, Tokyo, Japan	Decision (majority)	4 (ex.1)	3:00
2004-07-07	Loss	(Thailand) Buakaw Por.Pramuk	K-1 World MAX 2004 World Tournament Final	Shibuya, Tokyo, Japan	Ext R. decision (split)	4 (ex.1)	3:00
2004-05-22	Win	(Belgium) Gregory Swerts	SuperLeague Switzerland 2004	Winterthur, Switzerland	KO (punches)	4	
2004-04-07	Win	(United States) Duane Ludwig	K-1 World MAX 2004 World Tournament Open	Shibuya, Tokyo, Japan	Decision (unanimous)	3	3:00
2004-03-20	Win	(Austria) Fadi Merza	SuperLeague Italy 2004	Padua, Veneto, Italy	Decision (unanimous)	5	3:00
2004-03-04	Win	(Thailand) Nuengtrakarn Por.MuangUbon	S1 World Championships 2004, Final	Bangkok, Thailand	Decision (unanimous)	3	3:00
Wins title of S1 World Championships 2004 championship.
2004-03-04	Win	(France) Jean-Charles Skarbowsky	S1 World Championships 2004, Semi Finals	Bangkok, Thailand	TKO (referee stoppage)	3	0:40
2004-03-04	Win	(Russia) Magomed Magomedov	S1 World Championships 2004, Quarter Finals	Bangkok, Thailand	Decision (unanimous)	3	3:00
2003-12-06	Loss	(Germany) Kamal El Amrani	SuperLeague Netherlands 2003	Rotterdam, Netherlands	Decision (unanimous)	5	3:00
2003-07-04	Win	(Japan) Ryuji Goto	Shoot boxing "S of the World Vol.4"	Osaka, Osaka, Japan	TKO (referee stoppage)	7 (ex.2)	2:24
2003-04-27	Win	(Japan) Hiroyuki Doi	Xplosion 4 "Shoot boxing vs Muay Thai 3"	Sydney, Australia	KO (knee strike)	4	2:23
2002-12-15	Win	(Japan) Ryuji Goto	Xplosion Boonchu S-cup	Gold Coast, Australia	Decision (unanimous)	5	3:00
2002-11-26	Loss	(Greece) Mike Zambidis	K-1 Oceania MAX 2002 Final	Melbourne, Australia	Decision (majority)	3	3:00
The bout was for the title of K-1 Oceania MAX 2002 Tournament Championship.
2002-11-26	Win	(Australia) Shane Chapman	K-1 Oceania MAX 2002 Semi-final	Melbourne, Australia	KO (right cross)	3	
2002-11-26	Win	(Australia) Alex Tui	K-1 Oceania MAX 2002, Quarter-final	Melbourne, Australia	TKO (corner stoppage)	3	1:30
2002-10-25	Win	(Australia) Scott Bannan	Boonchu Cup	Southport, Queensland	Decision (unanimous)	5	3:00
2002-07-06	Loss	(Thailand) Nuengtakang Por.MuangUbon	Le Grand Tournoi, Quarter-final	Paris, France	Decision		3:00
2002-06-01	Win	(Canada) Baxter Humby	World Championship Kickboxing	Bernalillo, New Mexico, United States	TKO	3	?
2002-03-23	Win	(Thailand) Rodtung Wor-Taveekeat	Master Toddy Show @ Stardust Casino	Las Vegas, Nevada, United States	Decision (unanimous)	5	3:00
2001-12-05	Win	(Portugal) Miguel Marques	Kings Cup Tournament Final	Sanam Luang, Thailand	Decision (unanimous)	5	3:00
Wins Kings Cup Tournament Championship, Qualifies for Le Grand Tournoi.
2001-12-05	Win	(Thailand) Duanisan Kiatsarika	Kings Cup Tournament Semi-final	Sanam Luang, Thailand	Decision (unanimous)	3	3:00
2001-12-05	Win	(Thailand) Suriya Sor Ploenchit	Kings Cup Tournament Quarter-final	Sanam Luang, Thailand	Decision (unanimous)	3	3:00
2000-12-05	Win	(Thailand) Orono Por.MuangUbon	Thai King's Birthday Event "Kings Cup"	Sanam Luang, Thailand	Decision (unanimous)	5	3:00
Wins vacant title of IMF World Middleweight Championship.
2000-10-13	Win	(Australia) Scott Bannan	K-1 Queensland 2000	Brisbane, Australia	KO (right knee strike)	2	2:09
Wins Bannan's title of ISKA Muay Thai World Middleweight Championship.
2000-06-17	Win	(Australia) Oliver Olsen	The Ashes Muay Thai Megashow	Brisbane, Australia	TKO		
2000-05-20	Win	(Australia) Darren Reece	Boonchu Cup Muay Thai Explosion	Southport, Queensland	TKO		
2000-02-04	Loss	(Australia) Shane Chapman	Judgement Day Super 8, Semi Final	Melbourne, Victoria, Australia	Decision (unanimous)	3	3:00
2000-02-04	Loss	(Australia) Daniel Dawson	Judgement Day Super 8, Quarter Final	Melbourne, Victoria, Australia	Decision (unanimous)	4 (ex.1)	3:00
Despite loss advances to semi finals as Dawson too injured to continue.
1999-12-24	Draw	(Thailand) Chandet Sor Prantalay	MAJKF TORNADO WARNING	Tokyo, Japan	Decision	5	3:00
1999-12-05	Win	(Thailand) Paeng-rit Sor Prapaporn	Thai King's Birthday "King's Cup"	Sanam Luang, Bangkok, Thailand	Decision (unanimous)	5	3:00
1999-10-03	Win	(Australia) John Myles	Gold Coast Encounter	Southport, Queensland			
1999-05-23	Win	(Australia) Daniel Dawson	X-plosion I	Gold Coast, Australia	Decision (unanimous)	5	3:00
Wins W.M.T.C. Muaythai junior middleweight Australian title.
1999-04-24	Win	(Japan) Kenichi Ogata	MAJKF "In Search of The Strongest"	Bunkyo, Tokyo, Japan	KO (left hook)	2	1:48
1998-09-19	Loss	(Japan) Takashi Ito	AJKF & MAJKF Joint Event	Bunkyo, Tokyo, Japan	TKO (doctor stoppage)	2	2:47
1998-	Loss	(United Kingdom) Chris Allen		Melbourne, Australia	TKO (doctor stoppage)	5	
1998-04-25	Win	(Japan) Takayuki Kohiruimaki	J-Network	Tokyo, Japan	Decision (unanimous)	5	3:00
1998-	Loss	(Thailand) Superlek Sornisaan		Thailand	KO (right cross)	4	
1997-12-05	Win	(Thailand) Vihoknoi Ch.Malithong	Thai King's Birthday Event "King's Cup"	Samut Prakan, Thailand	Decision (unanimous)	5	3:00
1997-07-06	Loss	(Thailand) Orono Por.MuangUbon	Chachoengsao	Bangkok, Thailand	TKO (doctor stoppage)	2	
1997-05-30	Win	(Thailand) Joe Louie Muangsarin	Lumpinee Stadium	Bangkok, Thailand	TKO (right uppercuts)	4	
1997-03-15	Win	(Thailand) Raktae Muangsurin		Satun, Thailand	TKO (retirement/low kicks)	3	
1997-02-	Win	(Thailand) Maisot Muangsurin		Pichit, Thailand	Decision	5	
1995-	Win	(Japan) Takashi Nakajima	Conrad Jupiters Fights	Gold Coast, Australia	KO (low kick)	3	
1995-	Win	(Australia) Scott Lovelock		Australia	TKO	5	
Legend: Win Loss Draw/no contest Notes

== See also ==
- Champions of Champions Elite
- List of K-1 events
- List of male kickboxers
