= Shane Chapman =

New Zealand boxer

- Born: Shane Gary Chapman; 7 April 1978 (age 48); Auckland, New Zealand
- Other names: Poseidon / Gary / spaghetti sauce
- Nationality: New Zealander
- Height: 1.81 m (5 ft 11 in)
- Weight: 78 kg (172 lb; 12.3 st)
- Division: Super Middleweight
- Style: Muay Thai
- Team: Philip Lam's City Lee Gar
- Trainer: Philip Lam
- Years active: 1995–present

Professional boxing record
- Total: 11
- Wins: 9
- By knockout: 5
- Losses: 1
- Draws: 1

Kickboxing record
- Total: 89
- Wins: 65
- By knockout: 23
- Losses: 18
- Draws: 5
- No contests: 1

Other information
- Website: http://www.choppa.co.nz/home.htm
- Boxing record from BoxRec
- Last updated on: 28 January 2011

Shane "Choppa" Chapman (born 4 July 1978) is a New Zealand super middleweight kickboxer and boxer, fighting out of City Lee Gar Gym in Auckland. He is the 2002 and 2004 K-1 Oceania MAX champion and four-time Muay Thai World champion.

== Biography and career ==
Shane Chapman made his amateur kickboxing debut in 1995 aged 19, winning by TKO. Between 1995 and the latter half of 1997 he had a successful amateur career on the local circuit, winning 8 out of 9 fights and picking up the New Zealand North Island and South Pacific titles at super welterweight. On 18 September 1997 he made his professional Muay Thai debut defeating Norm Graham over 5 rounds at a domestic event in Auckland, New Zealand. In 1998 he won his first professional (and world) title by defeating a Chinese fighter to win the W.F.S.B. world title at light middleweight. He followed this up later in the year to claim his second world title in Hong Kong – this time it was the H.K.M.T.A. belt. Chapman was now a double world champion at just 19 years old.

By the turn of the millennium Chapman was facing stronger and stronger fighters from Thailand, Japan and Australia. Between the end of 1999 and throughout the majority of 2001, he went undefeated, winning 14 fights against opposition such as John Wayne Parr, Akeomi Nitta and Thai world champion Dejpayak Sasirapa, winning the Judgement Day 1 "Australasian Super 8" tournament, and the W.M.C. Asia-Pacific and I.S.S. Brute Force titles. His record ended on 15 August 2001 where he was stopped in the final of the Judgement 2 tournament by multiple Muay Thai and kickboxing world champion Daniel Dawson. At the end of 2001, Chapman made his K-1 MAX debut at the inaugural K-1 Oceania MAX 2001 tournament in Melbourne, Australia, with the prize being a place at the first ever K-1 MAX world final – an event for middleweight kickboxers (70 kg). Chapman won the tournament by defeating all three opponents via decision and booked his place in Tokyo as the Oceania regional winner. At the K-1 World MAX 2002 Chapman faced Albert Kraus in the quarter-finals. After three rounds it was eventual champion Kraus who had his hand raised - beating Shane by a close but unanimous decision after three rounds.

Chapman returned to K-1 MAX at the K-1 Oceania MAX 2002 event but the reigning champion could only make the semi-finals, losing to John Wayne Parr via knockout in a rematch of their 2000 bout which Shane had won. In 2003 he signed up with the newly created Austrian promotion SuperLeague and defeated Muay Thai champion Ole Laursen on his debut. Later that year he entered the second ever K-1 MAX New Zealand event, making the final but losing to Jordan Tai by a close split decision after three rounds. He lost his next couple of SuperLeague fights to Yoshihiro Sato and Kamal El Amrani but did manage to win his third world title – claiming the W.K.B.F. Muay Thai middleweight belt. He would also make his professional boxing debut that year and would have two matches (winning both) against local opposition.

After his defeat to El Amrani, Chapman went on another winning streak defeating nine opponents including victories against top level fighters such as Jean-Charles Skarbowsky, Arslan Magomedov and Ramazan Ramazanov. He also booked his place at the K-1 World MAX 2005 Open by winning his second K-1 MAX Oceania title in 2004. His winning streak ended at the elimination round in Tokyo, where he lost to rival and close friend John Wayne Parr in the last match of their trilogy of fights. With this defeat Shane would be unable to qualify for the K-1 World MAX final and would have his last bout with K-1, finishing 10 and 4 with the organisation. By the end of 2005 he won his fourth world title by defeating legendary Thai Lamsongkram Chuwattana in Hong Kong to claim the H.K.M.T.A. Muay Thai middleweight belt.

In 2006, Chapman returned to SuperLeague defeating Petr Polak and dropping a close decision to multiple world champion Dmitry Shakuta. These would be his last fights with the SuperLeague organization (which folded later that year), finishing with a 2 and 4 record in a very competitive 76 kg division. During the second half of the year, Chapman won the S-1 Oceania tournament in what would be his last major kickboxing title. During 2007 he would have a number of kickboxing bouts, with notable draws against Cosmo Alexandre and Eugune Ekkelboom respectively but was becoming more and more focused on his pro boxing career. In 2008 he would have his first shot at a boxing title but came up short against Daniel McKinnon who retained his W.B.O. Oriental super middleweight belt after twelve rounds.

== Titles ==
- 2006 S-1 Oceania tournament champion -72.5 kg
- 2005 H.K.M.T.A. Muay Thai Middleweight World champion -72.5 kg
- 2004 K-1 Oceania MAX champion -70 kg
- 2004 W.K.B.F. Muay Thai Middleweight World Champion -72.5 kg
- 2003 K-1 MAX New Zealand runner up -70 kg
- 2001 K-1 Oceania MAX champion -70 kg
- 2001 Judgement Day 2 "Super 8 Eliminator" tournament runner up -70 kg
- 2000 I.S.S. Brute Force champion -72 kg
- 2000 W.M.C. Asia-Pacific Light Middleweight champion -70 kg
- 2000 Judgement Day 1 "Australasian Super 8" tournament champion -70 kg
- 1998 H.K.M.T.A. Muay Thai Light Middleweight World champion -70 kg
- 1998 W.F.S.B. Light Middleweight World champion -70 kg
- 1997 South Pacific Super Welterweight Amateur champion -69.5 kg
- 1997 W.M.T.C. New Zealand North Island Super Welterweight Amateur champion -69.5 kg

== Fight record ==
Kickboxing record
65 wins (23 (T)KOs, 42 decisions), 18 losses, 5 draws, 1 no contest
| Date | Result | Opponent | Event | Location | Method | Round | Time | Record |
| 2008-07-29 | Win | (New Zealand) Daniel Kerr | Philip Lam Promotion | Auckland, New Zealand | TKO (referee stoppage) | 1 | | 65-18-5-1 |
| 2008-02-23 | Win | (Thailand) Sornchai Jarondee | Sifu's Super Saturday Vol. 4 | Auckland, New Zealand | Decision | 5 | 3:00 | 64-18-5-1 |
| 2007-09-03 | Draw | (Australia) Eugene Ekkelboom | S-1 Oceania Championship 2007 | Auckland, New Zealand | Decision draw | 5 | 3:00 | 63-18-5-1 |
Fight was originally for vacant W.B.C. Muay Thai World title but was changed to be for Ekkelboom's W.M.C. Muay Thai World title -76 kg. Due to the draw Ekkelboom would retain his world title.
| 2007-10-13 | Win | (Thailand) Kongsuriya | Rise of The Sun - "Double the Danger" | Papatoetoe, New Zealand | KO (right hook) | 1 | | 63-18-4-1 |
| 2007-10-13 | Win | (Thailand) Lerdmongkon Sor Tarntip | Rise of The Sun - "Double the Danger" | Papatoetoe, New Zealand | Decision | 3 | 3:00 | 62-18-4-1 |
| 2007-09-03 | Draw | (Brazil) Cosmo Alexandre | Philip Lam Promotion | Auckland, New Zealand | Decision draw | 5 | 3:00 | 61-18-4-1 |
| 2007-05-27 | Win | (Thailand) Si Nonachai | Melbourne Town Hall | Melbourne, Australia | Decision | 5 | 3:00 | 61-18-3-1 |
| 2007-03-25 | Win | (Ukraine) Dimitri Borulko | Melbourne Town Hall | Melbourne, Australia | Decision | 5 | 3:00 | 60-18-3-1 |
| 2007-03-03 | Win | (Thailand) Locthunan | Philip Lam Promotion | Auckland, New Zealand | Decision | 5 | 3:00 | 59-18-3-1 |
| 2006-12-16 | Win | (Canada) Alain Sylvestre | Philip Lam Promotion | Auckland, New Zealand | TKO (corner stoppage) | 2 | | 58-18-3-1 |
| 2006-09-02 | Win | (Thailand) Wanlop Sitpholek | S-1 Oceania 2006, Final | Auckland, New Zealand | KO (right hook) | 2 | | 57-18-3-1 |
Wins S-1 Oceania 2006 tournament -72.5 kg. As winner he was supposed to qualify for the W.M.C. S-1 World Final but would later withdraw from the event.
| 2006-09-02 | Win | (Australia) Warren Elson | S-1 Oceania 2006, Semi-finals | Auckland, New Zealand | Decision | 3 | 3:00 | 56-18-3-1 |
| 2006-09-02 | Win | (Thailand) Mot Eck Muangsenaa | S-1 Oceania 2006, Quarter-finals | Auckland, New Zealand | Decision | 3 | 3:00 | 55-18-3-1 |
| 2006-07-29 | Win | (Thailand) Saitan Kaikorwit | Philip Lam Promotion | Auckland, New Zealand | Decision | 5 | 3:00 | 54-18-3-1 |
| 2006-06-24 | Win | (Russia) Arslan Magomedov | K-1 Kings of Oceania 2006 Round 1, Super Fight | Auckland, New Zealand | Decision | 3 | 3:00 | 53-18-3-1 |
| 2006-05-13 | Loss | (Belarus) Dmitry Shakuta | SuperLeague Elimination 2006, Super Fight | Vienna, Austria | Decision | 3 | 3:00 | 52-18-3-1 |
| 2006-03-11 | Win | (Czech Republic) Petr Polak | SuperLeague Apocalypse 2006 | Paris, France | Decision | 3 | 3:00 | 52-17-3-1 |
| 2006-02-? | Draw | (Thailand) Phosai Sitpatong | City Lee Gar - YMCA | Auckland, New Zealand | Decision draw | 5 | 3:00 | 51-17-3-1 |
| 2005-11-18 | Win | (Thailand) Muayyak Chuwattana | Lee Gar 30th Anniversary | Auckland, New Zealand | KO | 3 | | 51-17-2-1 |
| 2005-08-30 | Win | (Thailand) Lamsongkram Chuwattana | H.K.M.T.A. Hong Kong Championships | Hong Kong | Decision (split) | 5 | 3:00 | 50-17-2-1 |
Wins H.K.M.T.A. Muay Thai Middleweight World title -72.5 kg.
| 2005-07-30 | NC | (Canada) Alain Sylvestre | K-1 Kings of Oceania 2005 Round 1, Super Fight | Auckland, New Zealand | No contest (injury) | 1 | 3:00 | 49-17-2-1 |
| 2005-07-16 | Win | (Thailand) Yodkhunsuk Kaewsamrit | Philip Lam Promotion - YMCA | Auckland, New Zealand | KO | 5 | | 49–17–2 |
| 2005-05-21 | Loss | (Germany) Kamal El Amrani | SuperLeague Germany 2005 | Oberhausen, Germany | Disqualification (kick to groin) | 5 | | 48–17–2 |
| 2005-05-04 | Loss | (Australia) John Wayne Parr | K-1 World MAX 2005 Open | Tokyo, Japan | KO (left punch) | 3 | 2:08 | 48–16–2 |
Fails to qualify for K-1 World MAX 2005 Final.
| 2005-04-02 | Win | (Thailand) Nuengtakang Por.Muang Ubon | International Fight Night | Auckland, New Zealand | Decision | 5 | 3:00 | 48–15–2 |
| 2005-02-18 | Win | (Thailand) Painiran Asani | Philip Lam Promotion - "Fight of the Century" | Auckland, New Zealand | KO | 4 | | 47–15–2 |
| 2004-12-18 | Win | (Russia) Ramazan Ramazanov | K-1 Challenge 2004 Oceania vs World | Gold Coast, Australia | Decision | 3 | 3:00 | 46–15–2 |
| 2004-11-05 | Win | (Morocco) Hamid Boujaoub | K-1 Oceania MAX 2004, Final | Auckland, New Zealand | Ext.R decision | 4 | 3:00 | 45–15–2 |
Wins K-1 Oceania MAX 2004 tournament -70 kg and qualifies for K-1 World MAX 2005 Open.
| 2004-11-05 | Win | (Russia) Arslan Magomedov | K-1 Oceania MAX 2004, Semi-finals | Auckland, New Zealand | TKO | 1 | | 44–15–2 |
| 2004-11-05 | Win | (New Zealand) Dwayne Glasgow | K-1 Oceania MAX 2001, Quarter-finals | Auckland, New Zealand | KO (body punch) | 1 | | 43–15–2 |
| 2004-09-25 | Win | (France) Jean-Charles Skarbowsky | NZ vs France | Auckland, New Zealand | Decision | 5 | 3:00 | 42–15–2 |
| 2004-08-28 | Win | (Thailand) Robert Kaennorasing | Philip Lam Promotion | Wellington, New Zealand | Decision | 5 | 3:00 | 41–15–2 |
| 2004-04-23 | Win | (Australia) Ashley White | K-1 Battle of Anzacs 2004 | Auckland, New Zealand | KO | 2 | | 40–15–2 |
| 2004-03-20 | Loss | (Germany) Kamal El Amrani | SuperLeague Italy 2004 | Padua, Italy | KO (kick to liver) | 3 | 1:45 | 39–15–2 |
| 2004-02-28 | Win | (Thailand) Chaowalit Jockygym | Philip Lam Promotion | New Zealand | Decision | 5 | 3:00 | 39–14–2 |
Wins W.K.B.F. Middleweight World title -72.5 kg.
| 2003-12-06 | Loss | (Japan) Yoshihiro Sato | SuperLeague Netherlands 2003 | Rotterdam, Netherlands | TKO (doc stop/cut shin) | 2 | 3:00 | 38–14–2 |
| 2003-11-07 | Loss | (New Zealand) Jordan Tai | K-1 MAX New Zealand 2003, Final | Auckland, New Zealand | Decision (split) | 3 | 3:00 | 38–13–2 |
Fight was for K-1 MAX New Zealand 2003 title -70 kg.
| 2003-11-07 | Win | (New Zealand) Aaron Boyes | K-1 MAX New Zealand 2003, Semi-finals | Auckland, New Zealand | KO (knee strike) | 1 | | 38–12–2 |
| 2003-11-07 | Win | (New Zealand) Lance Seranke | K-1 MAX New Zealand 2003, Quarter-finals | Auckland, New Zealand | TKO (referee stoppage) | 2 | | 37–12–2 |
| 2003-06-28 | Win | (Australia) Dominic Devanna | Hamilton Casino Bar | Hamilton, New Zealand | Decision (unanimous) | 5 | 3:00 | 36–12–2 |
| 2003-06-01 | Win | (Japan) Kenichi Ogata | Shootboxing - S of the World Vol 3 | Tokyo, Japan | Decision (unanimous) | 5 | 3:00 | 35–12–2 |
| 2003-05-10 | Win | (Philippines) Ole Laursen | SuperLeague Austria 2003 | Vienna, Austria | Decision (unanimous) | 3 | 3:00 | 34–12–2 |
| 2003-04-13 | Loss | (Netherlands) Andy Souwer | Shootboxing - S of the World Vol 2 | Tokyo, Japan | Ext. R disq. (low blow) | 6 | 1:01 | 33–12–2 |
| 2003-02-02 | Win | (Japan) Hiroyuki Doi | Shootboxing - S of the World Vol 1 | Tokyo, Japan | Decision | 5 | 3:00 | 33–11–2 |
| 2002-11-26 | Loss | (Australia) John Wayne Parr | K-1 Oceania MAX 2002, Semi-finals | Melbourne, Australia | KO (straight right punch) | 3 | | 32–11–2 |
| 2002-11-26 | Win | (Australia) Ryland Mahoney | K-1 Oceania MAX 2002, Quarter-finals | Melbourne, Australia | Decision | 3 | 3:00 | 32–10–2 |
| 2002-10-17 | Loss | (Thailand) Chao A Leut | Fanta & Audy Promotion | Auckland, New Zealand | Decision (split) | 5 | 3:00 | 31–10–2 |
Fight was for W.K.B.F. Super Welterweight World title -70 kg.
| 2003-?-? | Loss | (Australia) Jeremy Allen | Judgement Day 3, Semi-finals | Melbourne, Australia | Decision | 3 | 3:00 | 31–9–2 |
| 2003-?-? | Win | (Belarus) Alexei Perkachyk | Judgement Day 3, Quarter-finals | Melbourne, Australia | Decision (unanimous) | 3 | 3:00 | 31–8–2 |
| 2002-07-25 | Loss | (Thailand) Sagetdaw Kiatputon | New Zealand vs Thailand | New Zealand | Decision | 5 | 3:00 | 30–8–2 |
| 2002-05-11 | Loss | (Netherlands) Albert Kraus | K-1 World MAX 2002 Final, Quarter-finals | Tokyo, Japan | Decision (unanimous) | 3 | 3:00 | 30–7–2 |
| 2002 | Win | (Thailand) Lotchai | | New Zealand | Decision | 5 | 3:00 | 30–6–2 |
| 2001-11-11 | Win | (Australia) Mike Cope | K-1 Oceania MAX 2001, Final | Melbourne, Australia | Decision | 3 | 3:00 | 29–6–2 |
Wins K-1 Oceania MAX 2001 tournament -70 kg and qualifies for K-1 World MAX 2002 Final.
| 2001-11-11 | Win | (New Zealand) Alex Tui | K-1 Oceania MAX 2001, Semi-finals | Melbourne, Australia | Decision | 3 | 3:00 | 28–6–2 |
| 2001-11-11 | Win | (Australia) Dominic Devanna | K-1 Oceania MAX 2001, Quarter-finals | Melbourne, Australia | Decision | 3 | 3:00 | 27–6–2 |
| 2001-07-15 | Loss | (Australia) Daniel Dawson | Judgement Day 2, Final | Melbourne, Australia | TKO | 2 | | 26–6–2 |
Fight was for Judgement Day 2 "Super 8 Eliminator" tournament -70 kg.
| 2001-07-15 | Win | (Australia) Chris Collard | Judgement Day 2, Semi-finals | Melbourne, Australia | Decision | 3 | 3:00 | 26–5–2 |
| 2001-07-15 | Win | (Australia) Mike Cope | Judgement Day 2, Quarter-finals | Melbourne, Australia | Decision | 3 | 3:00 | 25–5–2 |
| 2001-05-19 | Win | (New Zealand) Norm Graham | First Ever Pro-Mix | Auckland, New Zealand | TKO | 3 | | 24–5–2 |
| 2000-11-30 | Win | (Netherlands) Gerbrand Takens | New Zealand vs Netherlands | Auckland, New Zealand | Decision | 5 | 3:00 | 23–5–2 |
| 2000-10-00 | Win | (Thailand) Siekarn | ISS Brute Force Challenge | Pattaya, Thailand | Decision | 5 | 3:00 | 22–5–2 |
Wins I.S.S. Brute Force title -72 kg.
| 2000-09-13 | Win | (Japan) Akeomi Nitta | AJKF Legend VIII | Tokyo, Japan | Decision | 5 | 3:00 | 21–5–2 |
| 2000 | Win | (Thailand) Dejpayak Sasirapa | | | Decision | 5 | 3:00 | 20–5–2 |
Wins W.M.C. Asia-Pacific Light Middleweight title -70 kg.
| 2000-06-29 | Loss | (Thailand) Chot Choe | KGB Challenge | Auckland, New Zealand | Decision | 5 | 3:00 | 19–5–2 |
| 2000-02-04 | Win | (Australia) Chris Collard | Judgement Day 1, Final | Melbourne, Australia | Decision (unanimous) | 2 | | 19–4–2 |
Wins Judgement Day 1 "Australasian Super 8" tournament -70 kg.
| 2000-02-04 | Win | (Australia) John Wayne Parr | Judgement Day 1, Semi-finals | Melbourne, Australia | Decision | 3 | 3:00 | 18–4–2 |
| 2000-02-04 | Win | (Australia) Bariz Nesif | Judgement Day 1, Quarter-finals | Melbourne, Australia | Decision | 3 | 3:00 | 17–4–2 |
| 2000-01-27 | Win | (Japan) Satoru Suzuki | "First Fight on the Millenium" | Auckland, New Zealand | KO | 1 | | 16–4–2 |
| 1999-11-11 | Win | (Thailand) Wan Farnadume | KGB Challenge | Auckland, New Zealand | Decision | 5 | 3:00 | 15–4–2 |
| 1999-09-09 | Win | (Thailand) Srisak | NZ-Aus-Thailand-Japan | Auckland, New Zealand | KO | 3 | | 14–4–2 |
| 1999-05-24 | Draw | (Japan) Akeomi Nitta | New Japan Kickboxing "Achievement 3" | Tokyo, Japan | Decision draw | 5 | 3:00 | 13–4–2 |
| 1999-02-17 | Loss | (Japan) Tarada Makaro | New Zealand vs Japan | Auckland, New Zealand | TKO | 2 | | 13–4–1 |
| 1998-11-12 | Win | (Thailand) Wahad Putranpar | New Zealand vs Japan | Auckland, New Zealand | TKO | 2 | | 13–3–1 |
| 1998-08-27 | Loss | (France) Yanek Marcel | New Zealand vs France + Thailand | Auckland, New Zealand | TKO (cut) | 1 | | 12–3–1 |
| 1998 | Win | (China) | | Hong Kong | TKO | 3 | | 12–2–1 |
Wins H.K.M.T.A. Muay Thai Light Middleweight World title -70 kg.
| 1998 | Win | (China) | | | KO | 3 | | 11–2–1 |
Wins W.F.S.B. Light Middleweight World title -70 kg.
| 1998-01-00 | Loss | (Thailand) Rung Thong | New Zealand vs Thailand | Auckland, New Zealand | Decision | 5 | 3:00 | 10–2–1 |
| ? | Loss | (Thailand) | | | Decision | 5 | 3:00 | 10–1–1 |
| 1997-11-13 | Win | (Thailand) Konjak | @ Sunset Palmz | Auckland, New Zealand | Decision | 5 | 3:00 | 10–0–1 |
| 1997-09-18 | Win | (New Zealand) Norm Graham | New Zealand vs Australia | Auckland, New Zealand | Decision | 5 | 3:00 | 9–0–1 |
Makes professional debut.
| 1997-07-10 | Win | (Australia) Luke Kempson | @ Mandaley | Auckland, New Zealand | Decision | 5 | 2:00 | 8–0–1 |
Wins South Pacific Super Welterweight Amateur title -69.5 kg.
| 1997-04-17 | Win | (New Zealand) David Achook | @ Sunset Palmz | Auckland, New Zealand | KO | 1 | | 7–0–1 |
| 1997-01-00 | Win | (Australia) Drew Petar | New Zealand vs Australia | Auckland, New Zealand | KO | 3 | | 6–0–1 |
| 1996-11-28 | Win | (New Zealand) Glen Burton | New Zealand vs Australia | Auckland, New Zealand | Decision | 3 | 2:00 | 5–0–1 |
Wins W.M.T.C. New Zealand North Island Super Welterweight Amateur title -69.5 kg.
| 1996-08-01 | Win | (New Zealand) James Griffiths | New Zealand vs England | Auckland, New Zealand | KO | 3 | | 4–0–1 |
| 1996-06-00 | Draw | (New Zealand) Steve Ross | New Zealand vs Australia | New Zealand | Decision draw | 3 | 2:00 | 3–0–1 |
| 1996-05-10 | Win | (New Zealand) David Carlisle | New Zealand vs USA | Auckland, New Zealand | Decision | 3 | 2:00 | 3–0 |
| 1996 | Win | (New Zealand) Sean Jennings | | New Zealand | KO | 1 | | 2–0 |
| 1995-11-30 | Win | (New Zealand) Cirilo Drumond | New Zealand vs Australia | Auckland, New Zealand | TKO | 2 | | 1–0 |
Legend: Win Loss Draw/no contest Notes

== Boxing record ==
Boxing record
9 wins (5 (T)KOs), 1 loss, 1 draw
| Date | Result | Opponent | Venue | Location | Method | Round | Time | Record |
| 2010-10-30 | Win | (New Zealand) Monty Fauea | ASB Stadium | Auckland, New Zealand | KO | 4 | | 9-1-1 |
| 2009-12-05 | Win | (New Zealand) Areta Gilbert | Headhunters Motorcycle Club | Auckland, New Zealand | Decision (unanimous) | 6 | 3:00 | 8–1–1 |
| 2009-11-21 | Win | (New Zealand) Fale Siaoloa | ASB Stadium | Auckland, New Zealand | Decision (unanimous) | 6 | 3:00 | 7–1–1 |
| 2009-10-03 | Draw | (New Zealand) Soulan Pownceby | Mystery Creek Events Centre | Hamilton, New Zealand | Technical decision | 3 | 1:40 | 6–1–1 |
Match resulted in a technical decision draw due to a cut suffered by Chapman after a clash of heads.
| 2008-11-08 | Win | (New Zealand) Fale Siaoloa | ASB Stadium | Auckland, New Zealand | TKO | 2 | | 6–1 |
| 2008-10-18 | Win | (New Zealand) Niusila Seiuli | YMCA Stadium | Auckland, New Zealand | TKO | 3 | | 5–1 |
| 2008-05-03 | Loss | (New Zealand) Daniel MacKinnon | Headhunters Motorcycle Club | Auckland, New Zealand | Decision (unanimous) | 10 | 3:00 | 4–1 |
Fight was for McKinnon's W.B.O. Oriental Super Middleweight title -76 kg.
| 2007-09-28 | Win | (New Zealand) Niusila Seiuli | Manurewa Netball Centre | Manukau City, New Zealand | Decision (unanimous) | 4 | 3:00 | 4–0 |
| 2005-04-16 | Win | (New Zealand) Charles August | Trusts Stadium | Auckland, New Zealand | KO | 2 | | 3–0 |
| 2002-12-14 | Win | (New Zealand) Aaron Boyes | YMCA Stadium | Auckland, New Zealand | Decision | 4 | 3:00 | 2–0 |
| 2002-08-16 | Win | (Samoa) Ionatana Pula | St James Theatre | Auckland, New Zealand | TKO | 3 | | 1–0 |
Legend: Win Loss Draw/no contest Notes

== See also ==
- List of male kickboxers
- List of K-1 events
