= Mai Soliman =

Egyptian-born Australian boxer (born 1998)

- Born: Mai Soliman; 4 January 1998 (age 28); Cairo, Egypt
- Other names: The Egyptian Queen
- Height: 5 ft 5 in (165 cm)
- Weight: 115 lb (52 kg; 8.2 st)
- Division: Super Flyweight
- Reach: 66.5 in (169 cm)
- Stance: Orthodox
- Fighting out of: Sydney, Australia
- Team: Akkawy Boxing Club
- Trainer: Mick Akkawy
- Years active: 2022–present

Professional boxing record
- Total: 11
- Wins: 10
- By knockout: 6
- Losses: 1

Other information
- Boxing record from BoxRec

Mai Soliman (born 4 January 1998) is an Egyptian-born Australian boxer.

== Early life ==
Soliman was born in Cairo, Egypt. At the age of six, she moved to Dublin, Ireland due to her father's work commitments before settling in Sydney, Australia when Soliman was nine years of age. She began swimming at the age of four at Cairo Sporting Club and went on to win a national title in Egypt as well as playing other sports while growing up such as athletics and soccer. Soliman discovered boxing while living in Australia in her final years of attending Blakehurst High School and began training at the Kostya Tszyu Boxing Academy at nearby Rockdale PCYC.

== Boxing career ==
After a lengthy amateur career, Soliman made her professional boxing debut in 2022 when she fought Ali Jensen at the Revesby Workers Club and was victorious via unanimous points decision.

=== Soliman vs. Hiruta ===
Soliman will face Mizuki Hiruta for the WBO and The Ring super-flyweight titles in her birthplace of Cairo, Egypt in front of the Pyramids of Giza on May 23, 2026. In the lead up to the fight, Soliman revealed she once dreamed of fighting in front of the pyramids.

== Professional boxing record ==
11 fights	10 wins	1 loss
By knockout	6	0
By decision	4	1

No.	Result	Record	Opponent	Type	Round	Date	Location	Notes
12	Loss (10-2)	-	(Japan) Mizuki Hiruta	-	-	23 May 2026	Pyramids of Giza, Giza, Egypt	WBO and The Ring Super Flyweight Women's Titles
11	Win	10-1	(Australia) Jasmine Parr	TKO	7 (10)	7 November 2025	Hyatt Place Event Center, Melbourne, Australia	IBF International Super Flyweight Women's Title
10	Win	9-1	(Thailand) Khwunchit Khunya	TKO	2 (8)	23 August 2025	The Grand Vaudeville, Sydney, Australia	
9	Win	8-1	(Thailand) Nattarat Prempida	TKO	1 (8)	28 June 2025	The Grand Vaudeville, Sydney, Australia	
8	Win	7-1	(Australia) Sarah Watt	TKO	3 (8)	28 March 2025	The Grand Vaudeville, Sydney, Australia	
7	Win	6-1	(Australia) Connie Brown	SD	6	28 August 2024	ICC Exhibition Centre, Sydney, Australia	
6	Win	5-1	(Thailand) Sawanya Srisawat	TKO	3 (4)	23 March 2024	JBS Basketball Arena, Ipswich, Australia	
5	Win	4-1	(New Zealand) Holly McMath	SD	8	30 October 2023	Revesby Workers Club, Sydney, Australia	
4	Win	3-1	(Australia) Nicila Costello	SD	6	30 June 2023	Revesby Workers Club, Sydney, Australia	
3	Win	2-1	(Australia) Sarah Higginson	TKO	4 (6)	15 March 2023	Kevin Betts Stadium, Sydney, Australia	
2	Loss	1-1	(Australia) Bec Moss	SD	6	2 September 2022	Revesby Workers Club, Sydney, Australia	ANBF Australasian Flyweight Women's Title
1	Win	1-0	(Australia) Ali Jensen	UD	4	2 July 2022	Revesby Workers Club, Sydney, Australia	
