= Jesse James Parr =

Australian mixed martial artist (born 2008)

- Born: Jesse James Parr; 1 May 2008 (age 18); Gold Coast, Queensland, Australia
- Other names: The Gunslinger
- Height: 5 ft 11 in (1.80 m)
- Weight: 145 lb (66 kg; 10 st 5 lb)
- Division: Featherweight
- Reach: 70 in (178 cm)
- Fighting out of: Gold Coast, Australia
- Team: Boonchu Gym
- Years active: 2026–present

Jesse James Parr (born 1 May 2008) is an Australian mixed martial artist. He currently competes in the featherweight division in the Australian Eternal MMA promotion.

== Early life ==
Parr was born and raised in Australia's Gold Coast. His Australian father, John Wayne Parr, is a 10-time kickboxing and Muay Thai world champion; his mother Angela is a naturalised Australian of Mexican-American descent who is a two-time kickboxing world champion. His sister, Jasmine, is a professional boxer competing in the flyweight division. Jesse James was introduced to combat sports at a young age at his parents' Boonchu Gym on the Gold Coast and he had his first Muay thai fight at eight years of age but gave the sport away as an 11 year old after a broken rib dissuaded him from continuing. His mother introduced him to Brazilian jiu-jitsu at 12 years old and he pursued the sport for several years before transitioning into mixed martial arts with the goal of fighting in the UFC in the future.

Parr has become known in his short MMA career for early finishes and backflips off the cage upon securing victory.

== Brazilian jiu-jitsu career ==
Parr is an accomplished Brazilian jiu-jitsu practitioner who claimed numerous national and continental titles throughout his upbringing. In December 2025, Parr won bronze medals in both the middleweight and open weight divisions at the World IBJJF Jiu-Jitsu No-Gi Championship in Las Vegas. In July 2026, at the age of 18, Parr competed in the Fusion Fighting Championship against an opponent 12 years his senior and came out victorious via submission.

== Mixed martial arts career ==
Parr made his MMA debut in August 2026 and won via armbar submission after 32 seconds at the Eternal MMA 108 event in his hometown of the Gold Coast. The win gained national media coverage in Australia and was shared on social media by prominent UFC fighters such as Israel Adesanya who dubbed Parr "the future" of the sport. A month later, he followed up his impressive debut win with a devastating 47-second TKO victory in his second fight. Prior to his third fight, Parr promised a finish and he delivered on an Eternal MMA card that was streamed on UFC Fight Pass with a TKO victory after 74 seconds.

Parr has stated that he aims to fight on Dana White's Contender Series in 2027.

== Mixed martial arts record ==
Professional record breakdown
3 matches	3 wins	0 losses
By knockout	2	0
By submission	1	0

Res.	Record	Opponent	Method	Event	Date	Round	Time	Location	Notes
Win	3–0	Ash Bristow	TKO	Eternal MMA 112	November 14, 2026	1	1:14	Gold Coast, Australia	
Win	2–0	Jayden Le Petit	TKO (Punches)	Eternal MMA 110	September 12, 2026	1	0:47	Gold Coast, Australia	
Win	1–0	Lakota Daniel	Submission (armbar)	Eternal MMA 108	August 4, 2026	1	0:32	Gold Coast, Australia	MMA debut.
