= Naruepol Fairtex =

Thai kickboxer

- Born: February 17, 1984 (age 42); Bangkok, Thailand
- Native name: นฤพนธ์ แฟร์เท็กซ์
- Other names: Mr. GQ; Narupon Sakhomsin (นฤพล ศักดิ์หอมศิลป์)
- Nationality: Thai
- Height: 1.80 m (5 ft 11 in)
- Weight: 66.7 kg (147 lb; 10.50 st)
- Division: Lightweight; Welterweight
- Style: Muay Thai
- Fighting out of: Tucson, Arizona
- Team: Fairtex Gym (2005–2012); Evolve MMA (2012–2015); KOA Fitness Fremont, CA (2015–2019); Carlson Gracie Tucson, AZ (2021–2026); Naruepon Muay Thai Academy (2026–present)
- Years active: 1992–present

Kickboxing record
- Total: 234
- Wins: 183
- By knockout: 53
- Losses: 46
- Draws: 5
- Last updated on: July 3, 2026

Naruepol (Naruepon) Fairtex (Thai: นฤพนธ์ แฟร์เท็กซ์; born February 17, 1984) is a Muay Thai fighter who fought out of Fairtex in Thailand and Evolve MMA in Singapore. He is a former Lumpinee Stadium champion and current No.1 contender to challenge Nopadetch Chuwattana for the WBC title.

In 2007 Naruepol was featured on the reality show The Contender Asia, where he was stopped in Episode 9 by Yodsaenklai Fairtex.

== Biography and career ==
Naruepol was born near Bangkok in Central Thailand. He started practicing Muay Thai when he was 7 years old at the Sakomsing Gym and had his first fight a year later. By the time Naruepol was 11 years old, he had made a name for himself and was participating in amateur fights at local festivals. At age 15, Naruepol had his first professional fight at Rajadamnern Stadium in 1999. Naruepol Fairtex Gym in 2005.

In 1999, Naruepol won the Lumpinee belt from Chokdee Por.Pramuk.

He was scheduled to face Andy Souwer at Fighterzone Kickboxing World Series MAX in Singapore on February 25, 2012. However, they were not paid by the promoter and the fight did not happen.

On May 27, 2018 in Oakland, California, Naruepol Fairtex defeated Phuket-based Gold Coast, Australia native Eddie Farrell (20-7-2) by TKO (**cut) at 1:17 of round 5 to win the IKF Pro Full Muay Thai Rules world title.

== Titles and accomplishments ==
- 2018 IKF Pro Full Muay Thai Rules Middleweight World Champion
- 2005 Champion of Thailand 140 lbs
- 1999 Lumpinee champion

== Fight record ==
Kickboxing record
183 wins (53 (T)KOs, 127 decisions), 46 losses, 5 draws
Date	Result	Opponent	Event	Location	Method	Round	Time
2019-04-19	Win	(Canada) Scott Mackenzie	Triumphant Muay Thai 7	Las Vegas, Nevada	Decision (unanimous)	5	3:00
2018-05-27	Win	(Australia) Eddie Farrell	Triumphant Muay Thai 4	Oakland, California	TKO (cut)	5	1:17
2017-03-03	Win	(Brazil) Amadeu Cristiano	Lion Fight 35	Mashantucket, Connecticut	Decision (unanimous)	5	3:00
2013-07-05	—N/a	(Italy) Sharos Huyer	—N/a	Trieste, Italy	—N/a	—N/a	—N/a
2012-04-28	Win	(France) Karim Ghajji	Boxe Thai et K1 Rules à Bagnolet	Paris, France	Decision	5	3:00
2011-11-05	Win	(China) Yin Jie	Legends of Heroes	ChangSha China	Decision	3	3:00
2011-08-13	Loss	(China) Zhao YaFei	Legends of Heroes: Kung Fu vs Muaythai	Nanchang China	Decision	3	3:00
2011-06-18	Win	(Spain) Jonay Risco	China Fight Night	China	Decision	3	3:00
2011-04-30	Win	(Suriname) Marco Piqué	Ring Rules Kickboxing	Milan, Italy	Ext.R decision	4	3:00
2010-12-18	Loss	(France) Abdallah Mabel	La Nuit des Challenges 9	Lyon, France	TKO (elbow/cut)	3	
2010-10-09	Win	(Japan) Toshiya Kurenai	Legends of Heroes: Muaythai vs Kung Fu, Arena of Stars, Genting Highlands	Pahang, Malaysia	Decision	5	3:00
2009-12-19	Loss	(China) Liu Ceng Ceng	Chinese Kung Fu vs Muaythai Competition at Lingnan Pearl Stadium	Foshan, China	Decision	5	3:00
2009-12-05	Loss	(Brazil) Cosmo Alexandre	Kings Birthday 2009 Muaythai Championship, Sanam Luang	Bangkok, Thailand	TKO (referee stoppage)		
2009-12-05	Win	(France) Cedric Muller	Kings Birthday 2009 Muaythai Championship, Sanam Luang	Bangkok, Thailand	Decision (unanimous)	3	3:00
2009-10-09	Win	(Australia) Soren Monkongtong	Evolution 18	Melbourne, Australia	KO (right high kick)	1	2:59
2009-09-13	Win	(Switzerland) Christophe Pruvost	M-1 Fairtex Muaythai event	Tokyo, Japan	Decision (unanimous)	5	3:00
2008-11-29	Loss	(France) Yohan Lidon	Le Nuit des Champions	Marseilles, France	TKO (dislocated shoulder)	3	
2008-11-08	Loss	(Italy) Giorgio Petrosyan	Janus Fight Night "The Legend"	Padua, Italy	Decision (unanimous)	5	3:00
2008-09-18	Win	(Australia) Soren Monkongtong	Return of "The Contenders"	Singapore	Decision (unanimous)	5	3:00
2008-06-25	Win	(South Africa) Vuyisile Colossa	Planet Battle	Hong Kong	Decision	3	3:00
2008-03-03	Win	(Assyrian homeland) Fadi Merza	SLAMM "Nederland vs Thailand IV"	Almere, Netherlands	TKO (corner stop/gave up)	4	0:00
2007-11-29	Win	(France) Wilfred Montagne	France vs Thailand	Paris, France	TKO (referee stoppage)	3	
2007-09-00	Loss	(Thailand) Yodsaenklai Fairtex	The Contender Asia Season I, Episode 9	Singapore	KO (punches)	2	0:30
2007-09-00	Win	(Canada) Trevor Smandych	The Contender Asia Season I, Episode 1	Singapore	Decision (unanimous)	5	3:00
2007-05-28	Win	(Thailand) Nontachai Sit-O	Daowrungchujarern, Rajadamnern Stadium	Bangkok, Thailand	Decision	5	3:00
2007-04-20	Win	(France) Yohan Lidon	Gala de Levallois-Perret	Levallois, France	Decision	5	3:00
2006-10-16	Win	(Thailand) Big Ben Chor Praram 6	Daowrungchujarern, Rajadamnern Stadium	Bangkok, Thailand	Decision	5	3:00
2006-05-14	Win	(Thailand) Nontachai Sit-O	Channel 7 Stadium	Bangkok, Thailand	Decision	5	3:00
2006-04-17	Win	(Thailand) Chaowalit Jockygym	Daorungchujarean, Rajadamnern Stadium	Bangkok, Thailand	Decision	5	3:00
Wins Thailand Welterweight 147lbs title.
2005-10-07	Loss	(Thailand) Noppadet Siangsimaewgym	Prianun, Lumpinee Stadium	Bangkok, Thailand	Decision	5	3:00
2005-09-09	Win	(Thailand) Khunsuk Phetsupaphan	Paianun, Lumpinee Stadium	Bangkok, Thailand	Decision (unanimous)	5	3:00
Wins Thailand Super-lightweight 140lbs title.
2005-08-05	Win	(Thailand) Phetnaimek Sor.Siriwat	Paianun, Rajadamnern Stadium	Bangkok, Thailand	Decision	5	3:00
2005-01-11	Loss	(Thailand) Munkong Kiatsomkuan	Prianun, Lumpinee Stadium	Bangkok, Thailand	Decision	5	3:00
2004-12-10	Loss	(Thailand) Chokdee Por.Pramuk	Por.Pramuk, Lumpinee Stadium	Bangkok, Thailand	Decision (unanimous)	5	3:00
Fight was for Lumpinee Super-lightweight (140 lbs) title.
2004-07-02	Win	(Thailand) Namsaknoi Yudthagarngamtorn	Paianun, Lumpinee Stadium	Bangkok, Thailand	Decision	5	3:00
2004-03-23	Win	(Thailand) Chokdee Por.Pramuk	Por.Pramuk, Lumpinee Stadium	Bangkok, Thailand	Decision	5	3:00
2003-12-02	Win	(Thailand) Petnamek Sor Siriwat	Praiannant, Lumpinee Stadium	Bangkok, Thailand	Decision (unanimous)	5	3:00
Wins Petnameks' Thailand Light-welterweight title.
2003-10-03	Loss	(Thailand) Munkong Keatsomkuan	Paianun, Lumpinee Stadium	Bangkok, Thailand	Decision	5	3:00
2002-11-11	Win	(Thailand) Noppadech2 Chuwattana	Lumpinee Stadium	Bangkok, Thailand	Decision	5	3:00
2002-05-18	Loss	(Thailand) Huasai Sor.Phumphanmuang		Bangkok, Thailand	Decision	5	3:00
2001	Loss	(Thailand) Thongthai Por.Burapha	Toyota Cup D4D Commonrail 2001, Quarter-finals	Bangkok, Thailand	KO	3	
Legend: Win Loss Draw/no contest Notes

== Personal life ==
In 2015, Naruepol Fairtex (aka "Mr. GQ" ) moved to the United States to teach and train Muay Thai fighters in Northern California. He was formerly affiliated with KOA Fitness in Newark, California as the head coach of the Muay Thai program.

In 2022, Naruepol moved to Tucson, Arizona and became the head instructor of the Muay Thai program at the martial arts gym Carlson Gracie. He is currently the head instructor of the Muay Thai Program at Naruepon Muay Thai Academy, in Tucson, Arizona.

== See also ==
- List of male kickboxers
