= Jasmine Parr =

Australian boxer (born 2003)

Jazzy Parr
- Born: Jasmine Parr; 5 February 2003 (age 23); Gold Coast, Queensland, Australia
- Other names: Princess Jasmine
- Height: 5 ft 4 in (163 cm)
- Weight: 125 lb (57 kg; 8.9 st)
- Division: Flyweight (Boxing); Lightweight (Muay Thai)
- Reach: 64 in (163 cm)
- Style: Muay Thai, Kickboxing
- Stance: Orthodox
- Fighting out of: Gold Coast, Queensland, Australia
- Team: Boonchu Gym
- Trainer: John Wayne Parr; Angela Rivera-Parr
- Years active: 2011–present

Professional boxing record
- Total: 10
- Wins: 8
- By knockout: 3
- Losses: 2

Kickboxing record
- Total: 26
- Wins: 19
- Losses: 5
- Draws: 2

Other information
- Boxing record from BoxRec

Jasmine Parr (born 4 February 2003) is an Australian kickboxer and boxer, fighting out of Boonchu Gym in Gold Coast, Queensland. She currently holds the Women's International Boxing Association world flyweight title.

== Early life ==
Parr was born and raised on the Gold Coast, Queensland, where she attended Robina State High School throughout her teenage years. Her Australian father, John Wayne Parr, is a 10-time kickboxing and Muay Thai world champion; her mother Angela is a naturalised Australian of Mexican-American descent who is a two-time kickboxing world champion. Her brother, Jesse James, is a professional MMA fighter. Jasmine was introduced to combat sports at a young age through her parents and famously competed in her first kickboxing fight at the age of 8. The decision to allow Parr to fight at a young age received national coverage and was met with mixed reactions. Subsequently, Parr decided to "retire" from fighting a year later after her second fight and focused on gymnastics instead.

In 2015, at the age of 11, Parr returned to the ring after being inspired to follow in the footsteps of UFC Champion Ronda Rousey and stated her career goal was to be a Muay Thai fighter for a few years before transitioning into mixed martial arts and winning a UFC Championship. She began training in Brazilian jiu-jitsu at the age of 11 and won gold medals in the adult lightweight divisions of the 2020 South Pacific BJJ Championships as a 17-year-old.

Parr works part-time as a model, and she has become known for her bubbly personality as well as her pre-fight weigh-in outfits. She has stated that outside of boxing her passion is surfing and is often involved in events held by Surfing Australia.

== Fighting career ==
=== Kickboxing ===
Parr began competing in kickboxing fights at the age of 8 and has had 26 fights as of November 2021. Her record currently stands at 19 wins, 5 losses and 2 draws. She is a multi-time national junior Muay Thai champion who has fought overseas in Canada, Thailand and England, the latter of which included winning an ICO Intercontinental Championship.

=== Boxing ===
Following Parr's October 30, 2021 kickboxing return fight from injury, she was offered the opportunity to make her professional boxing debut against Nicila Costello on short notice. The December 4, 2021, bout was for the Australian Super Flyweight Boxing Championship and Parr had just three weeks to train for the fight. She would defeat her opponent via unanimous decision and claim her first professional boxing championship, just over 20 years after her father claimed the Australian Middleweight Boxing Championship in July 2001. In December 2022, she claimed the Women's International Boxing Association (WIBA) world flyweight title in her third professional boxing bout. She fought once in 2023, defending her WIBA World Flyweight title against Brianna Harrison. In 2024, she earned her first TKO victory defeating Sarah Watt and followed it up with a Unanimous Decision victory against Thailand's Pannaporn Kaewpawong. Her 6-fight win streak came to an end with a controversial split decision loss to Shannon O'Connell in December 2024. However, she bounced back with a TKO first round win over Thailand's Jittamat Phomta in May 2025 and called for a rematch with Shannon O'Connell. In August 2025, she defeated Singapore's Efasha Kamarudin via TKO in the fifth round of their 5 Round Super Lightweight bout on the Nikita Tszyu Vs Lulzim Ismaili undercard.

=== Mixed martial arts ===
Parr revealed in February 2022 that she had begun the transition into mixed martial arts and planned to make her professional MMA debut in late 2022. She has however, not made her mixed martial arts debut as of August 2025 and continues to fight as a professional boxer. It is reported that Alexander Volkanovski is keen to help her transition to MMA and fight in the Ultimate Fighting Championship. However Parr has reaffirmed her commitment to winning a boxing world title.

== Professional boxing record ==
11 fights	9 wins	2 losses
By knockout	3	1
By decision	6	1

No.	Result	Record	Opponent	Type	Round, time	Date	Location	Notes
11	Win	9–2	(Australia) Jemma Peart	UD	8	12 August 2026	(Australia) Queensland, Gold Coast, The Star	
10	Loss	8–2	(Australia) Mai Soliman	TKO	7 (10)	7 November 2025	(Australia) Hyatt Place Event Center, Essendon Fields	IBF International Super Flyweight Women's Title
9	Win	8–1	(Singapore) Efasha Kamarudin	TKO	5 (5)	20 August 2025	ICC Exhibition Centre, Sydney, Australia	
8	Win	7–1	(Thailand) Jittamat Phomta	TKO	1 (5), 1:11	14 May 2025	Hordern Pavilion, Sydney, New South Wales, Australia	
7	Loss	6–1	(Australia) Shannon O'Connell	SD	8	13 Dec 2024	The Star Event Centre, Sydney, Australia	
6	Win	6–0	(Thailand) Pannaporn Kaewpawong	UD	6	28 Aug 2024	ICC Exhibition Centre, Sydney, Australia	
5	Win	5–0	(Australia) Sarah Watt	TKO	5 (6), 1:01	24 Apr 2024	Hordern Pavilion, Sydney, New South Wales, Australia	
4	Win	4–0	(Australia) Brianna Harrison	UD	10	8 Jul 2023	Southport Sharks, Gold Coast, Queensland, Australia	Defended WIBA world flyweight title.
3	Win	3–0	(Australia) Nicila Costello	UD	10	3 Dec 2022	The Star, Gold Coast, Queensland, Australia	Won WIBA world flyweight title.
2	Win	2–0	(New Zealand) Holly McMath	MD	6	7 Jul 2022	Mansfield Tavern, Brisbane, Queensland, Australia	
1	Win	1–0	(Australia) Nicila Costello	UD	8	4 Dec 2021	Eatons Hill Hotel, Brisbane, Queensland, Australia	Won Australian super flyweight title.
