= Akeomi Nitta =

Japanese kickboxer

- Born: July 23, 1973 (age 53); Tokyo, Japan
- Native name: 新田明臣
- Nationality: (Japan) Japanese
- Height: 1.80 m (5 ft 11 in)
- Weight: 70 kg (150 lb; 11 st)
- Division: Welterweight
- Style: Karate
- Fighting out of: Tokyo, Japan

Kickboxing record
- Total: 43
- Wins: 30
- By knockout: 16
- Losses: 10
- Draws: 3
- No contests: 0

Akeomi Nitta (新田明臣, born July 23, 1973) is a Japanese kickboxer. He is one of Japan's kickboxers in the welterweight division.

== Biography ==
=== Karate to kickboxing ===
In elementary school Akeomi Nitta loved baseball; during junior high he chose not to pursue sports, instead concentrating on other activities. Daido-juku karate rekindled his interest, and he won the first tournament that he participated in although he was only a white belt (beginner) at the time. Soon after he met his teacher, Mr. Katsuyama, and became a pupil of S.V.G., a kickboxing gym, he won the championship of Shin-karate absolute class by knocking out all his opponents.

=== As a kickboxer ===
He knocked out his opponent again in his first professional match, and the future welterweight champion of the New Japan Kickboxing Federation, Hiroshi Suzuki, in his second. He knocked out another future welterweight champion, of the All Japan Kickboxing Federation, Tatsuya Suzuki, and won 12 straight matches from April 1994 to September 1998. In October 1996, he won the New Japan Kickboxing Federation Middleweight championship title. In March 2000, he defeated Mohammed Owali, the WPKL World Super welterweight champion who no other Japanese kickboxer had been able to defeat. Two months later, he beat an Italian kickboxer and won the title of WKA World Thai Boxing Super Welterweight champion in Milan, Italy. Later, he won the All Japan Kickboxing Federation Middleweight Championship.

=== Challenge to K-1 ===
He had several K-1 matches, notably against Ramon Dekkers of the Netherlands—called "the strongest kickboxer of 20th century"—which ended in a draw. Dekker later said that Nitta was the strongest Japanese kickboxer. Nitta also KO'd American Kit Cope in K-1. In 2002 he participated in the K-1 WORLD MAX Japan Tournament, but was knocked out by Takashi Ohno, ISKA World Oriental Super Middleweight champion. In 2005 he defeated Ash-Ra, Takehiro Murahama and Koutetsu Boku while losing to Takayuki Kohiruimaki and Ian James Schaffa. In 2006 he lost to Yoshihiro Sato.

=== As a coach ===
He founded his own kickboxing gym named "BUNGELING BAY", and served as its president.

== Titles and accomplishments ==
- New Japan Kickboxing Federation
  - 1996 NJKF Middleweight Champion (defended twice)
- All Japan Kickboxing Federation
  - 1999 AJKF Middleweight Champion
- World Kickboxing Association
  - 2000 W.K.A. World Muay Thai Super Welterweight Champion
- IKUSA
  - 2004 IKUSA -70 kg Champion
- K-1
  - 2005 K1 World MAX Japan tournament Runner-up
- Universal Kickboxing Federation
  - 2007 UKF World Middleweight Champion

== Kickboxing record ==
Kickboxing Record
Date	Result	Opponent	Event	Location	Method	Round	Time
2008-01-13	Loss	(Canada) Jan Kaszuba	BUNGELING BAY ～enishi～	Tokyo, Japan	Decision (Split)	3	3:00
2007-04-22	Win	(Japan) Yuji Goto	SNKA TITANS NEOS	Tokyo, Japan	Decision (Majority)	3	3:00
2007-03-04	Loss	(Thailand) Kuntap Weerasakreck	M-1 FAIRTEX SINGHA BEER MuayThai Challenge 〜BATTLES OF FATE 2007〜	Japan	Decision (Unanimous)	5	3:00
For the M-1 Super Welterweight title.
2007-01-21	Win	(United States) Majit "The Magic Man"	Benny the Jet Produces BURAIKAN- J・BOY	Yokohama, Japan	Decision (Majority)	5	3:00
Wins UKF World Middleweight title.
2006-11-22	Win	(Australia) Daniel Smik	J-NETWORK MACH GO! GO! '06	Tokyo, Japan	Decision (Unanimous)	3	3:00
2006-04-28	Loss	(Turkey) Ali Gunyar	SNKA TITANS 3rd	Tokyo, Japan	Decision (Majority)	5	3:00
2006-02-04	Loss	(Japan) Yoshihiro Sato	K-1 World MAX 2006 Japan Tournament	Saitama, Japan	Decision (Unanimous)	3	3:00
2005-12-18	Draw	(Australia) Soren Monkongtong	SNKA FINAL 2005	Tokyo, Japan	Decision	5	3:00
2005-10-12	Loss	(Australia) Ian Schaffa	K-1 World MAX 2005 Champions Challenge	Tokyo, Japan	Decision (Unanimous)	5	3:00
2005-08-22	Loss	(Thailand) Shin Noppadetsorn	SNKA TITANS 2nd	Tokyo, Japan	Decision (Unanimous)	5	3:00
2005-07-20	Win	(Japan) Kotetsu Boku	K-1 World MAX 2005 Championship Final	Yokohama, Japan	Decision (Unanimous)	3	3:00
2005-06-18	Loss	(Japan) Kojiro	IKUSA GP -U60 SUPERSTAR☆Z TOURNAMENT -Opening Stage-	Tokyo, Japan	Decision (Unanimous)	5	3:00
Loses IKUSA -70kg title.
2005-05-06	Win	(Japan) Tetsuya Yamauchi	J-NETWORK「GO! GO! J-NET '05 -volcano-	Tokyo, Japan	Decision (Unanimous)	3	3:00
2005-02-23	Loss	(Japan) Taishin Kohiruimaki	K-1 World MAX 2005 Japan Tournament Final	Tokyo, Japan	KO (Right Front Kick)	1	0:36
For the K-1 World MAX 2005 Japan Tournament title.
2005-02-23	Win	(Japan) Takehiro Murahama	K-1 World MAX 2005 Japan Tournament semi-finals	Tokyo, Japan	Decision (Unanimous)	3	3:00
2005-02-23	Win	(Japan) ASH-RA	K-1 World MAX 2005 Japan Tournament, Reserve Fight	Tokyo, Japan	TKO (Low Kick)	2	2:10
2005-01-21	Win	(United States) Nick Fiordo	J-NETWORK GO! GO! J-NET '05 -volcano-	Tokyo, Japan	Decision (Unanimous)	3	3:00
2004-11-26	Win	(United States) David Archuleta	FUTURE FIGHTER IKUSA 6 〜(SORA)〜 GANGSTAR☆Z	Tokyo, Japan	Decision (Unanimous)	5	3:00
Wins inaugural IKUSA -70kg title.
2004-07-10	Win	(Australia) Ngakau Spain	IKUSA YOUNG GUNNERES 3 〜RETURNS〜	Tokyo, Japan	TKO (Low Kick)	2	2:59
2003-12-06	Loss	(Belgium) Gregory Swerts	SuperLeague Netherlands 2003	Rotterdam, Netherlands	Decision	5	3:00
2003-09-27	Loss	(Austria) Fadi Merza	SuperLeague Germany 2003	Germany	Decision	5	3:00
2002-12-08	Win	(United Kingdom) Sak Nayagam	AJKF BACK FROM HELL - II"	Tokyo, Japan	KO (3 Knockdowns)	2	2:10
2002-02-11	Loss	(Japan) Takashi Ohno	K-1 World MAX 2002 Japan Tournament, quarter-finals	Tokyo, Japan	KO (Left High Kick)	1	2:28
2001-07-22	Loss	(Japan) Takashi Ohno	AJKF BLAZE UP	Tokyo, Japan	KO (Left Knee)	4	1:37
2001-01-04	Win	(Japan) Takahiko Shimizu	AJKF THE CHAMPIONSHIP	Tokyo, Japan	Decision (Unanimous)	5	3:00
Defends AJKF Middleweight title.
2000-11-29	Win	(New Zealand) Raphael Tai	AJKF Legend X	Tokyo, Japan	Decision	5	3:00
2000-11-01	Draw	(Netherlands) Ramon Dekkers	K-1 J-MAX 2000	Tokyo, Japan	Decision (Majority)	5	3:00
2000-09-13	Loss	(New Zealand) Shane Chapman	AJKF Legend VIII	Tokyo, Japan	Decision	5	3:00
2000-09-03	Loss	(United Kingdom) Peter Crooke	AJKF LEGEND-VII	Tokyo, Japan	Decision (Majority)	5	3:00
2000-07-30	Win	(Italy) Matteo Sciacca	AJKF LEGEND-VII	Tokyo, Japan	TKO (Low Kick)	3	0:50
2000-05-24	Win	(New Zealand) Norm Graham	AJKF LEGEND-V	Tokyo, Japan	Decision (Unanimous)	5	3:00
2000-05-06	Win	(Italy) Stefano Stradella		Italy	TKO	3	2:50
Wins WKA World Muay Thai Super Welterweight title.
2000-03-16	Win	(Belgium) Mohammed Ouali	AJKF LEGEND-III	Tokyo, Japan	Decision (Split)	5	3:00
2000-02-20	Win	(Japan) Tetsushi Fujihara	AJKF LEGEND-II	Tokyo, Japan	KO (High Kick)	3	1:12
1999-11-22	Win	(United States) Kit Cope	AJKF: WAVE-XIII	Tokyo, Japan	KO (high kick)	3	2:21
1999-05-24	Draw	(New Zealand) Shane Chapman	New Japan Kickboxing "Achievement 3"	Tokyo, Japan	Decision Draw	5	3:00
1999-01-24	Loss	(Japan) Shigeru Ooba	NJKF	Tokyo, Japan	TKO	2	
1998-10-09	Loss	(Thailand) Numponton BangkokStore	NJKF	Tokyo, Japan	Decision	5	3:00
1998-09-11	Win	(France) Sidy Kone	Lumpini Stadium	Bangkok, Thailand	Decision	5	3:00
1998-05-31	Win	(Japan) Tetsushi Fujihara		Japan	KO	3	
1997-12-21	Win	(Japan) Taishin Kohiruimaki	J-Network "J-Prestage"	Tokyo, Japan	KO (Low Kicks)	4	2:13
1996-10-	Win	(Japan) Minoru Suzuki	NJKF	Tokyo, Japan	Decision	5	3:00
Wins NJKF Middleweight title.
Legend: Win Loss Draw/No contest Notes

== See also ==
- List of K-1 events
- List of male kickboxers
