= Soren Monkongtong =

Australian middleweight kickboxer (born 1980)

- Born: Soren King; 31 May 1980 (age 46)
- Other names: Monkongtong (Long Golden Dragon)
- Nationality: Australian
- Height: 1.80 m (5 ft 11 in)
- Weight: 72 kg (159 lb; 11.3 st)
- Division: Middleweight
- Style: Muay Thai
- Fighting out of: Brisbane, Queensland, Australia
- Team: Nugget's Thaiboxing Gym
- Trainer: Nugget McNaught
- Years active: 1995–present

Kickboxing record
- Total: 84
- Wins: 57
- By knockout: 34
- Losses: 25
- Draws: 2

Other information
- Website: http://www.sorenmonkongtong.com/
- Last updated on: 21 December 2009

Soren Monkongtong (born 31 May 1980) is an Australian middleweight kickboxer. In 2007 he took part of the reality based television series The Contender Asia.

== Biography and career ==
Soren Monkongtong started training in muay thai at the age of 13 and had his first fight at 15. He is now one of the most active professional Muay Thai fighters in the world. At the moment Soren is training at Eminent Air Gym in Bangkok. Some of the fighters he has fought are John Wayne Parr, Jomhod, Bruce Macfie, Naruepol Fairtex and Warren Elson. Soren has fought for the WMPF super-welterweight world title, however lost to the Thai fighter on the judges' scorecard. he is now retired and trains people at nuggets gym in Australia Brisbane.

=== The Contender Asia ===
In 2007 Soren Monkongtong was featured in The Contender Asia reality show. Soren was on the Tiger Kings. He fought Alain Sylvestre whom he beat and lost to Dzhabar Askerov after being knocked out by a vicious overhand right. In the Contender Finale, Soren fought Sean Wright and won on points.

== Titles ==
- 2007 WMC Intercontinental champion middleweight
- 2005 WMC Evolution champion
- 2004 WMC Evolution champion
- 2004 Chewang Stadium champion
- 2002 WMC SUPA8 champion
- 2002 WMC Intercontinental Welter weight champion
- 2001 Oceanic Champion
- 2001 Australia Champion

== Kickboxing record ==
57 Wins,25 Losses
| Date | Result | Opponent | Event | Method | Round | Time |
| 29 November 2009 | Win | (Australia) Bruce Macfie | Evolution 19, Australia | Decision (Split) | 5 | 3:00 |
| 9 October 2009 | Loss | (Thailand) Naruepol Fairtex | Evolution 18, Melbourne, Australia, | KO (Right high Kick) | 1 | 2:59 |
| 4 April 2009 | Win | (Scotland) Sean Wright | Evolution 16, Australia, | TKO | 5 | |
| 16 March 2009 | Loss | (Thailand) Kung Jak | Ch 5 Thailand "WPMF World Title", Thailand, | Decision | 5 | 3:00 |
| 7 December 2008 | Win | (Singapore) Kim Khan Zaki | Evolution 15, Australia, | TKO | 2 | 1:45 |
| 6 November 2008 | Win | (Netherlands) Harchim | Hong Kong Contender", Hong Kong, | TKO | 2 | 3:00 |
| 18 September 2008 | Loss | (Thailand) Naruepol Fairtex | REturn of "The Contenders", Singapore, | Decision | 5 | 3:00 |
| 31 August 2008 | Win | (Spain) Jo Pattayakombat | Ch 7 Stadium, Thailand | Decision | 5 | |
| 2008 | Loss | (Spain) Jo Pattayakombat | Ch 7 Stadium, Thailand | Decision | 5 | |
| 2008 | Win | (Scotland) Sean Wright | The Contender Finale, Singapore | Decision | 5 | |
| 2008 | Loss | (Thailand) Kung Jak | Ch 7 Stadium", Thailand | Decision | 5 | |
| 11 February 2008 | Loss | (Thailand) Lertmongkon Sor Tarntip | Rajadamnern Stadium, Thailand | Decision | 5 | |
| 2007 | Loss | (Australia) Eli Madigan | Evolution 12 "Cowboy to King", Brisbane, Australia | KO | 3 | |
| 2007 | Loss | (United Arab Emirates) Dzhabar Askerov | The Contender Asia, Singapore | KO | 1 | |
| 2007 | Win | (Canada) Alain Sylvestre | The Contender Asia, Singapore | TKO | 4 | 3:00 |
| 2007 | Win | (Thailand) Robert Por Cherdkiat | Ch 7 Stadium, Thailand | TKO | 4 | |
| 2007 | Win | (Thailand) Jomhod Kiatadisak | Lumpinee Stadium, Thailand | Decision | 5 | |
| 2007 | Win | (Thailand) Orono Por Muang Ubon | CHannel 7 Stadium, Thailand | Decision | 5 | |
| 2007 | win | (Thailand) Pepsi | Chewang stadium, Thailand | KO | 1 | |
| 28 April 2007 | win | (Thailand) Tun Nee Lek Samui | Evolution 11, Brisbane | KO | 2 | |
| 28 April 2007 | win | (Russia) Andrey Mishin | Evolution 10, Brisbane | KO | 2 | |
| 25 November 2006 | win | (Thailand) Pet Tuk Sin | Evolution 9, "reveng or Repeat" Brisbane, Australia | TKO | 4 | |
| 16 September 2006 | Loss | (Australia) John Wayne Parr | Evolution 8 "Final Count Down", Brisbane, Australia | KO | 4 | |
| 5 April 2006 | Loss | (Japan) Toshiyuki Kinami | K-1 World MAX 2006 World Tournament Open, Japan | Decision | 3 | |
| 6 August 2006 | Loss | (France) Cédric Muller | New Caladonia | DEC | 5 | |
| 2006 | Loss | (Thailand) Vuttichai Jeansiri | Brute Force 7, Melbourne | DEC | 5 | |
| 18 December 2005 | Draw | (Japan) Akeomi Nitta | Titans 3, Australia | Draw | 5 | |
| 2005 | win | (Tunisia) Ahmed Saadi | Evolution 6, Brisbane, Australia | KO (elbow) | 2 | |
| 2005 | Loss | (Australia) Warren Elson | Evolution 5, Brisbane, Australia | DEC | 5 | |
| 2005 | win | (New Zealand) Ngakau Spain | Evolution 5, Brisbane, Australia | KO | 2 | |
| 6 August 2005 | win | (Australia) Andrew Keogh | Prophecy Muay Thai, Australia | DEC | 5 | |
| 25 June 2005 | win | (Thailand) Wimberdon Soonkilawaket | K-1 Challenge 2005 Xplosion X | DEC | 3 | |
| 30 March 2005 | Win | (Japan) Masanaki Nagai | Evolution 4, Brisbane, Australia | KO | 1 | |
| 4 December 2004 | win | (Thailand) Yo Thai | Evolution 3, Brisbane, Australia | DEC | 5 | |
| 2004 | Win | (Australia) Ben Burton | Evolution 2 ", Brisbane, Australia | Decision | 5 | |
| 2004 | win | (Spain) Luengo Contreras | Evolution 1, Brisbane, Australia | KO | 1 | |
| 22 June 2004 | loss | (Australia) Ben Burton | Boonchu Cup, Gold Coast, Australia | DEC | 5 | |
| 23 October 2003 | win | (Australia) Andrew Keogh | waging war, Australia | DEC | 5 | |
| 22 June 2003 | win | (Thailand) Santi Udomchai | Thailand | DEC | 5 | |
| 2003 | loss | (Australia) Bruce Macfie | NTG Fight Night, Brisbane, Australia | DEC | 5 | |
| 2003 | loss | (Thailand) Den Phorjet | Australia | DEC | 5 | |
| 17 May 2003 | win | (Australia) Darren Reece | Perth, Australia | DEC | 5 | |
| 26 April 2002 | win | (Australia) Kurt Finlayson | SB Promotions: grand final, Australia | DEC | 5 | |
| 26 April 2002 | win | (Thailand) Supachai | SB Promotions: semi final, Australia | DEC | | |
| 26 August 2002 | win | (Australia) Collier | SB Promotions: quarter final, Australia | DEC | 5 | |
| 26 April 2002 | win | (Australia) Khalid Ahmed | Perth, Australia | KO | | |

== See also ==
- List of male kickboxers
