= Yodsanklai Fairtex =

Thai kickboxer (born 1985)

- Born: Yodthanong Photirat; July 1, 1985 (age 41); Udon Thani (now Nong Bua Lamphu), Thailand
- Native name: ยอดธณงค์ โพธิรัตน์
- Other names: Yodsanklai IWE Fairtex; Yodsanklai Petchyindee (ยอดแสนไกล เพชรยินดี); Yodsaenklai Siut Kru Od (ยอดแสนไกล ศิษย์ครูอ๊อด)
- Nickname: The Boxing Computer; The Hero
- Height: 172 cm (5 ft 8 in)
- Division: Mini Flyweight; Featherweight; Welterweight; Super Welterweight; Middleweight; Super Middleweight
- Reach: 179 cm (70 in)
- Style: Muay Thai (Muay Tae / Muay Bouk)
- Stance: Southpaw
- Fighting out of: Pattaya, Thailand
- Team: Fairtex Pattaya Gym (2005–present); Petchyindee Gym
- Trainer: Yak
- Years active: c. 1993–2021

Kickboxing record
- Total: 280
- Wins: 202
- By knockout: 78
- Losses: 74
- By knockout: 5
- Draws: 4

Yodthanong Photirat (Thai: ยอดธณงค์ โพธิรัตน์; born July 1, 1985), known professionally as Yodsanklai Fairtex (Thai: ยอดแสนไกล แฟร์เท็กซ์), is a Thai former professional Muay Thai fighter and kickboxer. He is a former WBC Muay Thai World Super welterweight champion at 154 lbs, a two-time Lumpinee Stadium champion in the 112 and 147 lb weight classes, and the champion of The Contender Asia. He was nicknamed "The Boxing Computer" by Thai sports newspapers as a testament to his perfect fighting technique.

== Background ==
Yodthanong Photirat was born in the Udon Thani Province (now Nong Bua Lamphu Province) in Northeastern Thailand, the hotbed of Muay Thai. He was introduced to the sport by his older brother Yodkangwan and started practicing when he was eight years old after watching his brothers' fights. He had his first fight at a temple fair in Ban Na Dee, his hometown, and received a fight fee of 20 ฿.

== Career ==
Before joining Fairtex in 2005, Yodsanklai fought for three camps: Saknipaporn, Sit-Khru-Od and Petchyindee. In August 2005, fighting under the name of Yodsanklai Petchyindee (ยอดแสนไกล เพชรยินดี), he won one of the most prestigious Muay Thai titles, the Lumpinee Stadium belt, by knocking out Runglaew. He became the 154 pound WBC Muay Thai World Champion by defeating Australian John Wayne Parr on December 10, 2005, in Gold Coast, Australia. In 2005, he won the Champion of Thailand (154 lb) title.

On June 30, 2006, Yodsanklai made his K-1 Max debut at Superfight at the K-1 World MAX 2006 World Championship Final held in Yokohama, Japan. He won against Kamal el Amrani by three round unanimous decision. Yodsanklai defended his WBC title on November 11, 2006, against Mark Vogel in Wuppertal, Germany, winning the fight by first round elbow knockout.

On November 29, 2007, Yodsanklai had a non-title contest at the "France vs Thailand" event held in Paris, France, against the Frenchmen Farid Villaume. Yodsanklai won the fight by third round referee stoppage TKO.

He fought former stablemate Kem Sitsongpeenong at Muay Thai Combat Mania: Pattaya in Pattaya, Thailand, on December 30, 2012, at a weight of 71 kg/156 lb, with same-day weigh-ins. Despite having not made such a low weight in a number of years, Yod came in at the limit in visibly better shape than in most of his recent fights and KO'd Kem with an elbow in round three.

Yod knocked out Gregory Choplin in round three at Lion Fight 8 in Las Vegas, Nevada, US, on January 25, 2013. He defeated Yohan Lidon by unanimous decision in a rematch at Warriors Night in Levallois, France, on March 2, 2013. On April 19, 2013, Yodsanklai TKO'd Naimjon Tuhtaboyev in round two at Thai Fight in Pattaya.

In June 2013, it was initially reported that Yodsanklai would fight Antoine Pinto at Thai Fight in Bangkok. However, his opponent was later switched to Kazbek Zubarov. He won via TKO at the end of round one when Zubarov suffered an injury.

Yod defeated Chike Lindsay for the inaugural Lion Fight Middleweight (-70 kg/154 lb) Championship at Lion Fight 10 in Las Vegas on July 26, 2013. Lindsay started well, but Yodsanklai took over in round two and began to cut the American up before taking the unanimous decision.

It was reported that Yod would fight Raphaël Llodra at the WBC World Muay Thai Millennium Championship in Saint-Pierre, Réunion, on September 7, 2013. However, he turned the fight down for monetary reasons. Instead, he knocked out Vladimir Konsky with a first round elbow in the quarter-finals of the 2013 edition of Thai Fight's -70 kg/154 lb tournament in Thailand on October 23, 2013. Then in semifinals, he defeated Samy Sana on November 30, 2013, and advanced to the final. He would go on to knock out Expedito Valin and win the tournament.

Yod was set to fight at Hero Legends in Jinan, China, on December 3, 2014 but withdrew for undisclosed reasons. He was also briefly expected to fight in the main event of Lion Fight 13 in Las Vegas on February 7, 2014, but quickly withdrew. He returned to the ring and beat Keo Rumchong by second-round KO at Thai Fight: Hua Hin 2014 in Hua Hin, Thailand, on February 22, 2014.

On May 1, 2017, Combat Press ranked Yodsanklai the #4 lightweight in the world.

On February 3, 2018, Yodsanklai returned to the ring, scoring a unanimous decision against German Enriko Kehl at Wu Lin Feng in Shenzhen, China.

=== ONE Championship ===
Yodsanklai then signed for ONE Championship. In his debut, he defeated Chris Ngimbi via unanimous decision. In his second bout with the promotion, he knocked out Luis Regis in the first round. At ONE Championship: A New Era on March 31, 2019, Yodsanklai defeated Andy Souwer by second-round technical knockout.

He was then entered in to the ONE Super Series Kickboxing Featherweight World Grand Prix, alongside the likes of Giorgio Petrosyan, Andy Souwer, and Petchmorrakot Petchyindee Academy. He would lose to Samy Sana by unanimous decision in Grand Prix Quarter-Finals at ONE Championship: Enter the Dragon.

On October 23, 2019, it was announced that Yodsanklai was scheduled to face World Lethwei Championship champion Sasha Moisa at ONE Championship: Age Of Dragons, his opponent was changed to Jamal Yusupov. In an upset, Yodsanklai lost to Yusupov, who'd taken the fight on short notice, by second-round knockout. This marked Yodsanklai's first knockout loss since 2005.

On June 28, 2020, it was announced that Yodsanklai would challenge Phetmorakot Petchyindee Academy for the ONE Featherweight Muay Thai World Championship at ONE Championship: No Surrender on July 31, 2020. Despite showing an improved performance from his last two fights, Yodsanklai was unable to win the title and lost to Phetmorakot by split decision.

=== Second retirement ===
On March 1, 2021, Yodsanklai announced his second retirement on social media.

== Titles and accomplishments ==
- Lion Fight
  - 2014 Lion Fight Super Welterweight (154 lbs) Champion
  - 2013 Lion Fight Super Welterweight (154 lbs) Champion (1 defense)
- Thai Fight
  - 2014 Thai Fight Super Welterweight (154 lbs) Tournament Champion
  - 2013 Thai Fight Super Welterweight (154 lbs) Tournament Champion
- World Muaythai Council (WMC)
  - 2012 WMC World Middleweight (160 lbs) Champion
  - 2010 WMC/S1 King's Cup Challenger Tournament Champion
  - 2008 WMC World Middleweight (160 lbs) Champion (4 defenses)
  - 2008 WMC Contender Asia Season 1 Middleweight (160 lbs) Champion
- Toyota Marathon
  - 2011 Toyota Vigo Marathon Middleweight (160 lbs) Tournament runner-up
  - 2003 Toyota D4D Marathon Tournament Featherweight (126 lbs) Champion
- SportAccord Combat Games
  - 2010 SportAccord Combat Games Silver medal - 75 kg
- World Professional Muaythai Federation (WPMF)
  - 2009 WPMF World Super Middleweight (168 lbs) Champion
  - 2006 WPMF World Super Welterweight (154 lbs) Champion
- Super 8
  - 2008 Super 8 Guinea Tournament Champion
- KO World Series
  - 2008 KO World Series Auckland Middleweight (160 lbs) Champion
- WBC Muay Thai
  - 2005–2009 WBC Muay Thai World Super Welterweight (154 lbs) Champion (2 defenses)
- Professional Boxing Association of Thailand (PAT)
  - 2005 Thailand Super Welterweight (154 lbs) Champion
- Lumpinee Stadium
  - 2005 Lumpinee Stadium Welterweight (147 lbs) Champion
  - 2001 Lumpinee Stadium Flyweight (112 lbs) Champion
  - 1999 Lumpinee Stadium Mini Flyweight (105 lbs) Champion

== Fight record ==
Muay Thai/kickboxing record
202 wins (78 (T)KOs, 117 decisions), 74 losses, 4 draws
Date	Result	Opponent	Event	Location	Method	Round	Time
2024-12-16	Win	(China) Zhou Jiao	Kunlun Fight & Cicada FC	Phnom Penh, Cambodia	TKO (left cross)	1	
2020-07-31	Loss	(Thailand) Phetmorakot Petchyindee Academy	ONE Championship: No Surrender	Bangkok, Thailand	Decision (majority)	5	3:00
For the ONE Muay Thai Featherweight title.
2019-11-16	Loss	(Russia) Jamal Yusupov	ONE Championship: Age Of Dragons	Beijing, China	KO (punches)	2	0:35
2019-05-17	Loss	(Algeria) Samy Sana	ONE Championship: Enter the Dragon	Kallang, Singapore	Decision (unanimous)	3	3:00
Kickboxing Featherweight Grand-Prix Quarter-Finals.
2019-03-31	Win	(Netherlands) Andy Souwer	ONE Championship 93: A New Era	Tokyo, Japan	TKO (ref stoppage)	2	0:51
2018-12-07	Win	(Australia) Luis Regis	ONE Championship: Destiny of Champions	Malaysia	KO (right uppercuts)	1	2:08
2018-07-28	Win	(China) Yuan Bing	EM-Legend 32	China	Decision	4	3:00
2018-05-18	Win	(Democratic Republic of the Congo) Chris Ngimbi	ONE Championship: Unstoppable Dreams	Singapore	Decision (unanimous)	3	3:00
2018-02-03	Win	(Germany) Enriko Kehl	Wu Lin Feng 2018: World Championship in Shenzhen	Shenzhen, China	Decision (unanimous)	3	3:00
2017-05-14	Win	(Japan) Soichiro Miyakoshi	Kunlun Fight 61 - Group H Tournament Final	Sanya, China	Decision (unanimous)	3	3:00
Qualified to Kunlun Fight 2017 70kg World Max Tournament Final 16.
2017-05-14	Win	(Suriname) Cedric Manhoef	Kunlun Fight 61 - Group H Tournament Semi Finals	Sanya, China	Decision (unanimous)	3	3:00
2017-04-15	Win	(Iran) Masoud Minaei	MAS 1	Guangzhou, China	TKO (3 knockdowns)	1	
2017-02-26	Win	(Russia) Saifullah Khambakhadov	Kunlun Fight 57	Sanya, China	KO (right uppercut)	2	1:32
2015-10-31	Win	(Russia) Dzhabar Askerov	Kunlun Fight 33 - World Max Tournament 2015 Final 16	Changde, China	Decision	3	3:00
Qualified to Kunlun Fight 2015 70kg World MAX Tournament Final 8.
2015-08-08	Win	(England) Marco Tentori	Origins 7: Yodsanklai vs Marco	Perth, Australia	Decision (unanimous)	5	3:00
2015-07-01	Win	(Australia) Victor Nagbe	T-One Muay Thai 2015	Beijing, China	Decision (unanimous)	3	3:00
2015-06-07	Win	(Belarus) Dzianis Zuev	Kunlun Fight 26	Chongqing, China	Decision (unanimous)	3	3:00
2015-05-02	Win	(France) Hamish Willey	THAI FIGHT Proud to Be Thai 2015: Samui	Samui, Thailand	KO (left punch)	1	
2015-04-12	Win	(Armenia) Marat Grigorian	Kunlun Fight 22	Changde, China	Decision	3	
2014-12-21	Win	(Switzerland) Christophe Pruvost	THAI FIGHT 2014 – 70 kg/154 lb Tournament Final	Bangkok, Thailand	TKO	1	
Wins the 2014 THAI FIGHT Super Welterweight (154 lbs) Tournament.
2014-11-22	Win	(Brazil) Alex Oller	THAI FIGHT 2014 – 70 kg/154 lb Tournament Semi-finals	Khon Kaen, Thailand	KO (elbows)	1	
2014-10-25	Win	(Denmark) Mohammed El-Mir	THAI FIGHT 2014 – 70 kg/154 lb Tournament Quarter-finals	Bangkok, Thailand	TKO	1	
2014-09-05	Win	(United Kingdom) Salah Khalifa	Lion Fight 18	Las Vegas, Nevada, USA	KO (punches and knee )	2	2:38
Defends the Lion Fight Super Welterweight (154 lbs) title.
2014-06-28	Win	(Lebanon) Fady Abboud	THAI FIGHT WORLD BATTLE 2014: Macao	Macau, China	KO (left high kick)	2	
2014-04-06	Win	(Portugal) Diogo Calado	THAI FIGHT WORLD BATTLE 2014: Chakrinaruebet	Sattahip, Thailand	Decision	3	3:00
2014-02-22	Win	(Cambodia) Keo Rumchong	THAI FIGHT WORLD BATTLE 2014: Klai Kang Won	Hua Hin, Thailand	KO (punches)	2	
2013-12-22	Win	(France) Expedito Valin	THAI FIGHT 2013 – 70 kg/154 lb Tournament Final	Bangkok, Thailand	KO (punches)	2	
Wins the 2013 THAI FIGHT Super Welterweight (154 lbs) Tournament.
2013-11-30	Win	(France) Samy Sana	THAI FIGHT 2013 – 70 kg/154 lb Tournament Semi-finals	Bangkok, Thailand	Decision	3	3:00
2013-10-23	Win	(Slovakia) Vladimir Konsky	THAI FIGHT 2013 – 70 kg/154 lb Tournament Quarter-finals	Bangkok, Thailand	KO (left elbow)	1	
2013-07-26	Win	(United States) Chike Lindsay	Lion Fight 10	Las Vegas, Nevada, USA	Decision (unanimous)	5	3:00
Wins the Lion Fight Super Welterweight (154 lbs) title.
2013-06-29	Win	(Russia) Kazbek Zubarov	THAI FIGHT EXTREME 2013: Bangkok	Bangkok, Thailand	TKO (injury)	1	3:00
2013-04-19	Win	(Uzbekistan) Naimjon Tuhtaboyev	THAI FIGHT EXTREME 2013: Pattaya	Pattaya, Thailand	TKO (right hook)	2	
2013-03-02	Win	(France) Yohan Lidon	Warriors Night	Levallois, France	Decision (unanimous)	5	3:00
2013-01-25	Win	(France) Gregory Choplin	Lion Fight 8	Las Vegas, Nevada, USA	KO (punches)	3	2:40
2012-12-30	Win	(Thailand) Kem Sitsongpeenong	Muay Thai Combat Mania: Pattaya	Pattaya, Thailand	KO (elbow)	3	
2012-05-26	Win	(Slovakia) Vladimír Moravčík	Profiliga Muaythai 12	Banská Bystrica, Slovakia	TKO	3	
Wins the WMC World Middleweight (160 lbs) title.
2011-11-26	Loss	(Ukraine) Artur Kyshenko	Rumble of the Kings 2011	Stockholm, Sweden	Decision (unanimous)	3	3:00
2011-10-28	Loss	(Thailand) Prakaysaeng Sit Or	Toyota Vigo Marathon 2011, Final	Korat, Thailand	Decision	3	2:00
For the 2011 Toyota Vigo Marathon Middleweight (160 lbs) Tournament Final.
2011-10-28	Win	(France) Antuan Siangboxing	Toyota Vigo Marathon 2011, Semi Final	Korat, Thailand	Decision	3	2:00
2011-10-28	Win	(Thailand) Sirimongkon Sitanupap	Toyota Vigo Marathon 2011, Quarter Final	Korat, Thailand	Decision	3	2:00
2011-11-05	Win	(China) Hou Xu	Legends of Heroes 2011	Changsha, China	TKO	1	
2011-08-13	Draw	(China) Aotegen Bateer	Legends of Heroes: Kung Fu vs Muaythai	Nanchang, China	Ext. R decision	4	3:00
2011-08-07	Loss	(Japan) Yasuhito Shirasu	THAI FIGHT EXTREME 2011: Japan	Ariake Coliseum, Japan	Decision (unanimous)	3	3:00
2011-07-17	Win	(France) Karim Ghajji	THAI FIGHT EXTREME 2011: Hong Kong	Hong Kong, China	Decision	3	3:00
2011-06-18	Win	(Spain) Fran Palenzuela	Fighting Legend - World Professional Championships	Chengdu, China	TKO	2	
2011-05-14	Win	(Portugal) Jose Barradas	THAI FIGHT EXTREME 2011: France	Cannes, France	Decision	3	3:00
2010-12-05	Win	(Brazil) Cosmo Alexandre	Kings Birthday 2010, Final	Bangkok, Thailand	Decision	3	2:00
Wins the WMC/S1 Kings Cup Challenge Tournament Final.
2010-12-05	Win	(England) Jordan Watson	Kings Birthday 2010, Semi final	Bangkok, Thailand	Decision	3	2:00
2010-12-05	Win	(South Africa) Vuyisile Colossa	Kings Birthday 2010, Quarter final	Bangkok, Thailand	Decision	3	2:00
2010-10-17	Loss	(Australia) John Wayne Parr	Pay Back Time 2, Powerplay Promotions	Melbourne, Australia	Decision (split)	5	3:00
For the WKA World Middleweight (160 lbs) title.
2010-10-09	Win	(China) Wang Guan	Legends of Heroes: Muaythai vs Kung Fu	Pahang, Malaysia	Decision	3	3:00
2010-03-20	Win	(Netherlands) Abdel Halim Issaoui	Kickboxing Superstar XIX Edition	Milan, Italy	TKO (cut)	4	
2010-02-13	Loss	(South Africa) Vuyisile Colossa	Boxe-Thai Guinea tournament 2	Malabo, Equatorial Guinea	Decision (unanimous)	5	3:00
2009-11-29	Win	(Morocco) Khalid Bourdif	SLAMM "Nederland vs Thailand VI"	Almere, Netherlands	Decision (unanimous)	5	3:00
Defends the WMC World Middleweight (160 lbs) title.
2009-11-07	Win	(Suriname) Marco Pique	Janus FightNight: Thai Boxe Last Challenge	Padua, Italy	Decision (unanimous)	3	3:00
2009-06-26	Win	(Brazil) Cosmo Alexandre	Champions of Champions 2	Montego Bay, Jamaica	KO (left low kick)	4	0:25
Defends the WMC World Middleweight (160 lbs) title.
2009-03-26	Win	(South Africa) Vuyisile Colossa	Les Stars du Ring 2009	Levallois-Perret, France	Decision (unanimous)	5	3:00
2009-01-18	Win	(Japan) Takaaki Nakamura	M.I.D. Japan presents "Thailand Japan" 2009	Japan	Decision (unanimous)	5	3:00
Wins the vacant WPMF World Super Middleweight (168 lbs) title.
2008-12-20	Win	(Thailand) Lamsongkram Chuwattana	Boxe-Thai Guinea tournament	Malabo, Equatorial Guinea	KO (right uppercut)	1	2:50
Wins the Boxe-Thai Guinea 8-Man Tournament Champion.
2008-12-20	Win	(France) Yohan Lidon	Boxe-Thai Guinea tournament	Malabo, Equatorial Guinea	TKO (doctor stoppage)	2	3:00
2008-12-20	Win	(Belarus) Denis Varaksa	Boxe-Thai Guinea tournament	Malabo, Equatorial Guinea	KO (punches)	3	1:08
2008-11-25	Win	(South Africa) Vuyisile Colossa	Planet Battle	Hong Kong, China	Decision (unanimous)	3	3:00
2008-09-17	Win	(Thailand) Madsua lamai gym	Return Of The Contenders	Singapore City	KO (body shot)	3	2:42
Defends the WMC World Middleweight (160 lbs) title.
2008-06-20	Win	(Thailand) Malaipet Team Diamond	Champions of Champions	Montego Bay, Jamaica	TKO (doc stop/cut, swollen left eye)	3	3:00
Defends the WBC Muaythai World Super Welterweight (154 lbs) title.
2008-05-31	Win	(Russia) Artem Levin	K-1 Scandinavia MAX 2008	Stockholm, Sweden	KO (right hook)	2	0:40
Defends the WMC World Middleweight (160 lbs) title.
2008-04-12	Win	(Australia) John Wayne Parr	The Contender Asia Finale	Singapore City	Decision (unanimous)	5	3:00
Wins the WMC The Contender Asia Season I and WMC World Middleweight Champion (160 lbs).
2008-03-02	Loss	(Netherlands) Andy Souwer	SLAMM "Nederland vs Thailand IV"	Almere, Netherlands	Ext. R decision	4	3:00
2008-02-09	Win	(Russia) Dimitry Simoukov	KO World Series 2008 Auckland	Auckland, New Zealand	KO (left hook)	1	2:23
Wins the 2008 KO World Series Auckland Tournament.
2008-02-09	Win	(New Zealand) Shannon Foreman	KO World Series 2008 Auckland	Auckland, New Zealand	TKO (corner stoppage)	2	2:10
2007-11-29	Win	(France) Farid Villaume	France vs Thailand	Paris, France	TKO (referee stoppage)	3	
2007-10-00	Win	(Scotland) Sean Wright	The Contender Asia Season I, Episode 13	Singapore	KO (right uppercut)	2	1:18
2007-09-00	Win	(Thailand) Naruepol Fairtex	The Contender Asia Season I, Episode 9	Singapore	KO (punches)	2	0:30
2007-09-00	Win	(Australia) Bruce Macfie	The Contender Asia Season I, Episode 4	Singapore	Decision (unanimous)	5	3:00
2007-05-30	Win	(France) Sebastien Favre	Fairtex Thepprasit Stadium	Pattaya, Thailand	TKO (referee stoppage)	2	2:44
2007-05-30	Draw	(France) Farid Villaume	France vs Thailand	Paris, France	Draw	5	3:00
2007-01-11	Win	(France) Rafik Bakkouri	Fairtex Thepprasit Stadium	Pattaya, Thailand	KO (knee strike)	3	1:30
2006-11-11	Win	(Germany) Mark Vogel	Masters Fight Night	Wuppertal, Germany	KO (elbow)	1	
Defends the WBC Muaythai World Super Welterweight (154 lbs) title.
2006-08-23	Win	(Denmark) Rasmus Zoeylner	WPMF Championships	Nakhon Sawan, Thailand	Decision (unanimous)	5	3:00
Wins the WPMF World Super Welterweight (154 lbs) title.
2006-06-30	Win	(Germany) Kamal El Amrani	K-1 World MAX 2006 World Championship Final	Yokohama, Japan	Decision (unanimous)	3	3:00
2006-05-13	Win	(Poland) Maciej Skupinski	Best of The Best II	Warsaw, Poland	TKO	1	
2006-04-12	Win	Arslan Iran Rompo Gym	Fairtex Thepprasit Stadium	Pattaya, Thailand	TKO (referee stoppage)	1	
2006-02-11	Win	(France) Elias Ayras	Lumpinee Krikkri, Lumpinee Stadium	Bangkok, Thailand	TKO (referee stoppage)	2	
2005-12-10	Win	(Australia) John Wayne Parr	Xplosion 12	Gold Coast, Australia	Decision (unanimous)	5	3:00
Wins the vacant WBC Muaythai World Super Welterweight (154 lbs) title.
2005-09-06	Win	(Thailand) Samkor Kiatmontep	Petchyindee, Lumpinee Stadium	Bangkok, Thailand	Decision (unanimous)	5	3:00
Wins the vacant Thailand (PAT) Super Welterweight (154 lbs) title.
2005-08-16	Win	(Thailand) Riuankaew S.Boonya	Fairtex, Lumpinee Stadium	Bangkok, Thailand	TKO	2	
Wins the vacant Lumpinee Stadium Welterweight (147 lbs) title.
2005-07-08	Loss	(Thailand) Noppadet Sengsiewmaigym	Kiatphet, Lumpinee Stadium	Bangkok, Thailand	Decision (unanimous)	5	3:00
2005-05-29	Loss	(Thailand) Noppadet Sengsiewmaigym	Channel 7 Stadium	Bangkok, Thailand	Decision (unanimous)	5	3:00
2005-03-24	Win	(Thailand) Noppakao Sor Wanchart	Daorungchujarean, Rajadamnern Stadium	Bangkok, Thailand	Decision (unanimous)	5	3:00
2005-02-25	Win	(Thailand) Tuantong Chartchatree	Petchyindee, Lumpinee Stadium	Bangkok, Thailand	TKO	3	
2005-01-21	Loss	(Thailand) Orono Wor Petchpun	Wanboonya, Lumpinee Stadium	Bangkok, Thailand	KO (knee strikes)	3	
2004-12-23	Win	(Thailand) Lakhin Sor.Saraythong	Daorungchujaroen, Rajadamnern Stadium	Bangkok, Thailand	Decision	5	3:00
2004-11-12	Win	(Thailand) Sagatpetch Sor.Sakulpan	Fairtex, Lumpinee Stadium	Bangkok, Thailand	Decision	5	3:00
2004-08-27	Loss	(Thailand) Sagatpetch Sor.Sakulpan	Wanboonya, Lumpinee Stadium	Bangkok, Thailand	Decision	5	3:00
2004-07-14	Win	(Thailand) Lakhin Sakjavee	Daorungprabat, Rajadamnern Stadium	Bangkok, Thailand	Decision	5	3:00
2004-06-22	Win	(Thailand) Charlie Sor Chaitamin	Fairtex, Lumpinee Stadium	Bangkok, Thailand	TKO (left straight)	1	
2004-05-04	Loss	(Thailand) Orono Wor Petchpun	Petchyindee, Lumpinee Stadium	Bangkok, Thailand	TKO (elbows and punches)	4	
2004-04-02	Loss	(Thailand) Singdam Kiatmoo9	Petchyindee + Wanwerapon, Lumpinee Stadium	Bangkok, Thailand	Decision (unanimous)	5	3:00
2004-02-24	Loss	(Thailand) Singdam Kiatmoo9	Lumpinee Stadium	Bangkok, Thailand	Decision (unanimous)	5	3:00
For the Thailand (PAT) Featherweight (126 lbs) title.
2004-01-27	Win	(Thailand) Watcharachai Kaewsamrit	Petchpiya, Lumpinee Stadium	Bangkok, Thailand	TKO	1	
2004-01-03	Win	(Thailand) Pornpitak Petchudomchai	Lumpinee krikkai, Lumpinee Stadium	Bangkok, Thailand	KO	2	
2003-11-15	Win	(Thailand) Nopparat Keatkhamtorn	Lumpinee krikkai, Lumpinee Stadium	Bangkok, Thailand	Decision	5	3:00
2003-10-11	Win	(Thailand) Phutawan Buriramphukaofire	Lumpinee krikkai, Lumpinee Stadium	Bangkok, Thailand	KO (left cross)	3	2:47
2003-08-16	Win	(Thailand) Kaew Fairtex	Lumpinee krikkai, Lumpinee Stadium	Bangkok, Thailand	Decision	5	3:00
2003-06-14	Loss	(Thailand) Wanmeechai Menayotin	Lumpinee krikkai, Lumpinee Stadium	Bangkok, Thailand	Decision	5	3:00
2003-03-28	Win	(Thailand) Nopparat Keatkhamtorn	Lumpinee Stadium - Toyota Marathon, Final	Bangkok, Thailand	KO (uppercut)	3	
Wins the Toyota Marathon Featherweight (126 lbs) Tournament.
2003-02-18	Win	(Thailand) Pornsanae Sitmonchai	Fairtex, Lumpinee Stadium	Bangkok, Thailand	KO (high kick)	4	
2003-01-14	Loss	(Thailand) Pornsanae Sitmonchai	Petpanomurung, Lumpinee Stadium	Bangkok, Thailand	KO	3	
2002-10-11	Loss	(Thailand) Nopparat Keatkhamtorn	Lumpinee krikkai, Lumpinee Stadium	Bangkok, Thailand	Decision	5	3:00
2002-07-05	Loss	(Thailand) Wanpichai Sor.Khamsing	Lumpinee Stadium	Bangkok, Thailand	Decision	5	3:00
2002-05-10	Win	(Thailand) Kaew Fairtex	Lumpinee Stadium	Bangkok, Thailand	Decision	5	3:00
2002-04-09	Loss	(Thailand) Pethapee Chor Chingwong	Muaythai Gala	Thailand	KO	3	
2002-01-04	Win	(Thailand) Yortong Pitak-Kruchaiden	Lumpinee Stadium	Bangkok, Thailand	KO	3	
2001-08-21	Win	(Thailand) Dejdamrong Sor Amnuaysirichoke	Lumpinee Stadium	Bangkok, Thailand	Decision	5	3:00
2001-06-15	Win	(Thailand) Sam-A Kaiyanghadaogym	Lumpinee Stadium	Bangkok, Thailand	Decision	5	3:00
2001-04-13	Win	(Thailand) Namsuek Petchsupaphan	Lumpinee Stadium	Bangkok, Thailand	Decision	5	3:00
1999-07-17	Win	(Thailand) Dejdamrong Sor Amnuaysirichoke	Lumpinee Stadium	Bangkok, Thailand	Decision	5	3:00
Loses the Lumpinee Stadium Mini Flyweight (105 lbs) title.
1999	Win	(Thailand) Sam-A Tor.Rattanakiat	Lumpinee Stadium	Bangkok, Thailand	Decision	5	3:00
Wins the vacant Lumpinee Stadium Mini Flyweight (105 lbs) title.
Legend: Win Loss Draw/no contest Notes

== Amateur record ==
Amateur kickboxing record
2 wins, 1 losses
Date	Result	Opponent	Event	Location	Method	Round	Time
2010-09-02	Loss	(Russia) Artem Levin	2010 World Combat Games -75 kg Muay Thai, Final	Beijing, China	Decision (2-3)	4	2:00
Wins the 2010 World Combat Games -75 kg/165 lb Muay Thai Silver Medal.
2010-08-31	Win	(Ukraine) Vasyl Tereshonok	2010 World Combat Games -75 kg Muay Thai, Semi finals	Beijing, China	Decision (4-1)	4	2:00
2010-08-29	Win	(Brazil) Guilherme Jung	2010 World Combat Games -75 kg Muay Thai, Quarter finals	Beijing, China	TKO (referee stoppage)		
Legend: Win Loss Draw/no contest Notes

== See also ==
- List of male kickboxers
- Champions of Champions Elite
