= The Contender Asia =

- Logo
- Also known as: The Contender: Kickboxer (UK); The Contender: Muay Thai (US) (AU)
- Created by: Mark Burnett
- Directed by: Jerry Schaffer; Ozzie Smith
- Presented by: Stephan Fox; Jaymee Ong
- Country of origin: Singapore
- Original language: English
- No. of episodes: 15

Production
- Executive producers: Riaz Metha; Joel Lin; Mark Burnett; Jeffrey Katzenberg

Original release
- Network: AXN Asia; ITV4 (UK); Versus (United States); DStv (South Africa); FOX8 (Australia)
- Release: January 16 – April 23, 2008

Related
- The Contender

The Contender Asia (known as The Contender: Kickboxer in the United Kingdom, and The Contender: Muay Thai in the United States) was a reality-based television series that follows 16 Muay Thai middleweight fighters from 12 countries as they compete in a series of outdoor challenges and sanctioned matches. The series is a deviation from the original Contender series, which involved boxing. The winner received US$150,000 and bragging rights as "The Contender Champion".

The program was hosted by Vice President of World Muay Thai Council and former World Champion Stephen Fox (who also serves as the show's main trainer) and Jaymee Ong.

The second season has been announced on its official website. Production will begin in late September 2009 in Kuala Lumpur, Malaysia, with 16 fighters (14 currently revealed) vying for the title and a bigger cash prize, which the producers say as "the highest prize money ever to be paid out in the sport of Muay Thai."

== Contestants ==
WILD BOARS	TIGER KINGS
Rafik Bakkouri – Leader	John Wayne Parr – Leader
Naruepol Fairtex	Yodsanklai Fairtex
Bruce "The Preacher" Macfie	Soren Monkongtong
David Pacquette	Jose "Pitu" Sans
Alain Sylvestre	Dzhabar Askerov^{1}
Zidov "Akuma" Dominik^{2}	James Martinez
Joakim "Yukay" Karlsson	Kim "Zig Zach" Khan Zaki
Sean Wright^{3}	Trevor "TNT" Smandych

^{1} Currently based in the United Arab Emirates.
^{2} Currently based in Thailand.
^{3} Currently based in Thailand.

== Episode summary ==
=== Episode 1 ===
Original airdate: January 16, 2008
The contestants, handpicked by Fox and his team of trainers, were introduced and brought to their loft where they would be staying during the course of the competition. The fighters were then divided into two groups: Blue Team and Red Team. Fox selected the team captains based on their fight records and characters. The leaders then chose their teammates in a "school yard pick", with John Wayne Parr choosing Yodsanklai first while Sean Wright was chosen last by Rafik Bakkouri.

Blue Team and Red Team were given the names "Wild Boars" and "Tiger Kings" respectively, based on legendary Muay Thai fighters.

During the challenge, Kim stumbled and cost the Tiger Kings a loss.

- Challenge: A relay race wherein the contestants ran in pairs bound by ropes.
- Challenge winner: WILD BOARS
- Match: Naruepol vs. Trevor Smandych
- Match winner: Naruepol (by decision)
- Eliminated: Trevor Smandych

=== Episode 2 ===
Original airdate: January 23, 2008
The Tiger Kings were devastated with Trevor Smandych's loss and felt unwell that they did not gave him a decent farewell. Meanwhile, the Wild Boars were triumphant with Naruepol declaring that the fight was "easy". Other members began contemplating about the pressure of defeating Thai fighters especially in their national sport, but Rafik Bakkouri stayed firm that he was not afraid of the Thais in and out of the ring.

- Challenge: A dragon boat race along Singapore River.
- Challenge winner: WILD BOARS
- Match: Sean Wright vs. James Martinez
- Match winner: Sean Wright (by technical knockout)
- Eliminated: James Martinez

=== Episode 3 ===
Original airdate: January 30, 2008
The Wild Boars celebrated their second consecutive win, while the Tiger Kings were starting to feel angry at their opponents. This anger was channelled on the following training session as Dzahbar Askerov felt offended by the Wild Boars' fits of laughter during a discussion. Dzahbar Askerov and Rafik Bakkouri had a shouting match which resulted in a brawl between the two. The informal fight was broken up by several trainers.

- Challenge: A five-man relay race which involved lunges, sit-ups, push-ups, jump rope and carrying a weight in a swimming pool.
- Challenge winner: TIGER KINGS
- Match: John Wayne Parr vs. Rafik Bakkouri
- Match winner: John Wayne Parr (by decision)
- Eliminated: Rafik Bakkouri

=== Episode 4 ===
Original airdate: February 6, 2008
The Tiger Kings were ecstatic as they celebrate the loss of the opposing team's captain Rafik Bakkouri, while John Wayne Parr had his nose stitched. He even quipped that he already had 186 stitches in his face alone and this number might reach 200 sooner than later. Meanwhile, the Wild Boars elected Bruce as their new captain. But the Wild Boars' problems were compounded when David Pacquette, Zidov Dominik, Naruepol, Joakim Karrison, and Alain Sylvestre fell ill. Soren Monkongtong used this as an opportunity to train harder.

- Challenge: Retrieve the pieces of a puzzle from inside giant blocks of ice, and put them together to appease the figures of Chinese mythology who were depicted in the masks in Haw Par Villa.
- Challenge winner: TIGER KINGS
- Match: Yodsaenklai vs. Bruce Macfie
- Match winner: Yodsaenklai (by decision)
- Eliminated: Bruce Macfie

=== Episode 5 ===
Original airdate: February 13, 2008
The Tiger Kings once again were elated at their win, finally evening the fight at 2-2. In a show of sportsmanship, even the Wild Boars congratulated Yodsaenklai for his victory. Later, when David Pacquette saw that the food Alain Sylvestre was eating was not very appetizing, he explained to David Pacquette that he had to eat this way because he has Crohn's disease. After training, the Wild Boars once again elected for a new captain, this time giving the helm to David Pacquette. He, meanwhile, had reservations because of his new "jinxed" role, considering his predecessors were both eliminated.

- Challenge: A truck pull tug-of-war.
- Challenge winner: TIGER KINGS
- Match: Soren Monkongtong vs. Alain Sylvestre
- Match winner: Soren Monkongtong (by technical knockout – referee stopped contest)
- Eliminated: Alain Sylvestre

=== Episode 6 ===
Original airdate: February 20, 2008
The Tiger Kings had tipped the scales in their favor securing yet another win for them. The gloomy Wild Boars were encouraged by the newest captain to work even harder in the challenge to gain the opportunity to tip the scales back in their favor. At the Courts Megastore challenge, the Tiger Kings defeated the Wild Boars again by barely mere second. The triumphant Tiger Kings were juxtaposed with the frustrated Wild Boars over losing the opportunity to choose for the fourth time in a row. For their reward, the Tiger Kings won another shopping spree in Courts Megastore.

During deliberation, John Wayne believed that Dzhabar should fight David and eliminate the strongest competition from their team. During the match, tempers flew as they fought each other viciously. Blood spilled from both men though Dzhabar devalued himself by succumbing to dirty tactics in the ring that lost him two points. Despite this, it was a close fight between the two men with the score being 96-95. Finally it was announced that Dzhabar had succeeded David.

- Challenge: A box-by-box unload off a dolly in Courts Megastore.
- Challenge winner: TIGER KINGS
- Match: Dzhabar Askerov vs. David Pacquette
- Match winner: Dzhabar Askerov (by decision)
- Eliminated: David Pacquette

=== Episode 7 ===
Original airdate: February 27, 2008

- Challenge: One-by-one swim in the water to retrieve a plaque, come back on land and destroy a watermelon using the action on the plaque; namely kicking and punching.
- Challenge winner: WILD BOARS
- Match: Zidov "Akuma" Dominik vs. Kim Khan Zaki "Zig Zach"
- Match winner: Zidov "Akuma" Dominik (by technical knockout-Dislocated shoulder from previous injury occurred during a challenge)
- Eliminated: Kim Khan Zaki "Zig Zach"

=== Episode 8 ===
Original airdate: March 5, 2008

- Challenge: Complete a high ropes course six levels above the ground, there were four sections; each team member would complete one section; start at the beginning of the course, complete their section and tag their team member at the end who would then start his course.
- Challenge winner: TIGER KINGS
- Match: Jose "Pitu" Sans vs. Joakim "Yukay" Karlsson
- Match winner: Joakim "Yukay" Karlsson (by knockout)
- Eliminated: Jose "Pitu" Sans

=== Episode 9 ===
Original airdate: March 12, 2008
For the rest of the episodes, no more teams, team captains, team challenges, and for the elimination fight, the fate was with the Chinese Drawers, where each fighter would have to pull one drawer. If it's empty, the fighter would not have to fight the elimination fight. If it's occupied with an amulet, the fighter would have to fight. If the amulet is red, the fighter would have to fight in the red side. Same thing for the blue side.

- Match: Yodsaenklai vs. Naruepol
- Match winner: Yodsaenklai (by knockout)
- Eliminated: Naruepol

=== Episode 10 ===
Original airdate: March 19, 2008

- Match: Sean Wright vs. Joakim "Yukay" Karlsson
- Match winner: Sean Wright (by technical knockout)
- Eliminated: Joakim "Yukay" Karlsson

=== Episode 11 ===
Original airdate: March 26, 2008

- Match: John Wayne Parr vs. Zidov "Akuma" Dominik
- Match winner: John Wayne Parr (By Knockout)
- Eliminated: Zidov "Akuma" Dominik

=== Episode 12 ===
Original airdate: April 2, 2008

- Match: Soren Monkongtong vs. Dzhabar Askerov
- Match winner: Dzhabar Askerov (by knockout)
- Eliminated: Soren Monkongtong

=== Episode 13 ===
Original airdate: April 9, 2008

- Match: Yodsaenklai vs. Sean Wright
- Match winner: Yodsaenklai (by knockout)
- Eliminated: Sean Wright

=== Episode 14 ===
Original airdate: April 16, 2008

- Match: John Wayne Parr vs. Dzhabar Askerov
- Match winner: John Wayne Parr (by decision)
- Eliminated: Dzhabar Askerov

=== Episode 15 (Finale) ===
Original airdate: April 23, 2008

- Match: Yodsaenklai vs. John Wayne Parr
- Match winner: Yodsaenklai (by decision)
- Eliminated: John Wayne Parr

Co-Commentators -"The Voice" Michael Schiavello & Mark " The Hammer"Castagnini

Emcee for the Final -Perry Cale -Australia

== Elimination summary ==
Elimination Chart
Yodsaenklai				WIN					WIN				WIN		WIN
John Wayne			WIN								WIN			WIN	LOSS
Dzabhar						WIN						WIN		LOSS	
Sean		WIN								WIN			LOSS		
Soren					WIN							LOSS			
Zidov							WIN				LOSS				
Joakim								WIN		LOSS					
Naruepol	WIN								LOSS						
Pitu								LOSS							
Zach							LOSS								
David						LOSS									
Alain					LOSS										
Bruce				LOSS											
Rafik			LOSS												
James		LOSS													
Trevor	LOSS														

Challenge and match winner
Challenge loser and match winner
Match winner
Challenge winners
Match loser
Challenge winner and match loser
Challenge and match loser

== International broadcast ==
Country	Broadcasting Network	Broadcasting Channel
Whole Asia	Sony Pictures Television International	AXN Asia
United Kingdom	ITV plc	ITV4
United States	NBCUniversal	Versus (now NBCSN)
South Africa	Direct Broadcast Satellite	M-Net
Australia	Foxtel	FOX8
Finland	MTV OY	Sub
