= Champions of Champions Elite =

Champions of Champions Elite, or COC-Elite, is a martial arts television show focused on Muay Thai that is currently airing once a month on G4TV. The show features matches in the Champions of Champions tournaments, officially sanctioned by the World Muay Thai Council (WMC), interspersed with documentary-style footage of the featured fighters such as Clifton Brown, Kaoklai Kaennorsing, Julie Kitchen, Nathan Corbett, Yodsanklai Fairtex, and others. Also featured on the show are segments about the history of Muay Thai and "Clifton Brown’s Muay Thai Tips", a segment that tutors viewers in the performance of various Muay Thai moves.

On October 22, 2010, Champions of Champions Elite aired an episode that featured the Kings Cup Super Eight tournament from Bangkok, Thailand, marking the first time that the Kings Cup was shown on American television.
