= Satoruvashicoba =

Japanese kickboxer

- Born: Satoru Kobayashi; July 5, 1974 (age 52); Tokyo, Japan
- Native name: サトルヴァシコバ
- Other names: 小林 悟（こばやし さとる）, サトルッチ
- Nationality: Japan
- Height: 1.70 m (5 ft 7 in)
- Weight: 65.0 kg (143.3 lb; 10.24 st)
- Division: Lightweight
- Style: Shin Karate, Kickboxing
- Stance: Southpaw
- Fighting out of: Ōme, Tokyo, Japan

Kickboxing record
- Total: 30
- Wins: 16
- By knockout: 8
- Losses: 12
- Draws: 2

Satoruvashicoba (サトルヴァシコバ, Satoru Kobayashi, born July 23, 1974) is a Lightweight Japanese kickboxer who is notable for fighting in the All Japan Kickboxing Federation and K-1. He also has victories over Satoshi Kobayashi and Koji Yoshimoto.

== Career ==
January 4, 2006 in Tokyo, Japan AJKF NEW YEAR KICK FESTIVAL 2006, Satoruvashicoba defeated Koji Yoshimoto to win the AJKF All Japan Lightweight Championship by KO in the second round.

== Championships and awards ==
Kickboxing

- All Japan Kickboxing Federation
  - 2006 AJKF Lightweight Champion
  - 2004 AJKF All Japan Lightweight Tournament 2004 Runner-Up

Muay Thai

- WFCA
  - 2005 WFCA Muaythai Super Lightweight Championship

Karate

- Amateur
  - 2001 All Japan Shin Karate Lightweight Championship Winner
  - 2002 All Japan Shin Karate Super Lightweight Championship Winner

== Kickboxing record ==
Kickboxing record
16 Wins (8 (T)KO's), 12 Losses, 1 Draw
Date	Result	Opponent	Event	Location	Method	Round	Time
2008-01-04	Loss	(Japan) Yu Hirono	AJKF "New Year Kick Festival 2008" - 70's Tournament Reserve Fight	Japan	Decision (Unanimous)	3	3:00
2007-10-03	Loss	(Turkey) Murat Direkçi	K-1 World MAX 2007 Final, Reserve Fight	Tokyo, Japan	KO (Left Hook)	2	0:39
2007-04-04	Loss	(Hong Kong) Heung Pak-Wing	K-1 MAX 2007 Final Elimination	Yokohama, Japan	TKO (Right Knee to the Head)	1	0:33
2007-02-05	Loss	(Japan) Kazuya Yasuhiro	K-1 WORLD MAX 2007 ~Japan National Team Tournament ~[Reserve Fight]	Japan	Decision (Unanimous)	3	3:00
2006-09-04	Win	(Japan) Taka Osamitsu	K-1 WORLD MAX 2006 〜 World Championship	Japan	KO (Left cross)	1	0:55
2006-07-23	Loss	(Japan) Hiromasa Masuda	AJKF "Spear of Destiny"	Tokyo, Japan	TKO (Doctor Stoppage)	3	2:13
Loses the AJKF Lightweight Championship.
2006-03-19	Draw	(Thailand) Sinbad Sithbank	AJKF "SWORD FIGHT 2006"	Tokyo, Japan	Decision	5	3:00
2006-01-04	Win	(Japan) Koji Yoshimoto	AJKF NEW YEAR KICK FESTIVAL 2006	Tokyo, Japan	KO (Left Hook)	2	2:30
Wins the AJKF Lightweight Championship.
2005-11-12	Win	(Japan) Takehiro Yamada	AJKF "Fight Must Go On [All Japan Lightweight Championship Tournament Semi finals]	Tokyo, Japan	Decision (Unanimous)	3	3:00
2005-09-09	Win	(Netherlands) Omar Van Ben Roy	RISING SUN 6	Netherlands	KO (Punch)	2	
Wins WFCA Thai Boxing World Super Lightweight Championship.
2005-05-15	Loss	(Japan) Masami Yamamoto	AJKF “STRAIGHT”	Tokyo, Japan	TKO (Doctor Stoppage)	2	3:00
2005-03-18	Win	(Japan) Takahito Fugimaki	AJKF All Japan Lightweight Championship "RUSH!"	Tokyo, Japan	KO (Left cross)	2	2:39
2005-01-04	Loss	(Mongolia) Tsogto Amara	AJKF “SURVIVOR” All Japan Lightweight Championship	Tokyo, Japan	Decision (Unanimous)	5	3:00
For the AJKF All Japan Lightweight Championship.
2004-11-19	Win	(Japan) Koji Yoshimoto	AJKF The Championship, All Japan Lightweight Championship Tournament, Semi Final	Tokyo, Japan	KO (Left Hook)	2	0:31
2004-08-22	Loss	(England) Liam Harrison	A.J.K.F. SUPER FIGHT -LIGHTNING-	Tokyo, Japan	Decision (Majority)	5	3:00
2004-06-18	Loss	(Thailand) Samkor Kiatmontep	AJKF All Japan Lightweight Tournament 2004 FINAL STAGE, Semi Final	Tokyo, Japan	Decision (Unanimous)	3	3:00
2004-04-16	Win	(Japan) Satoshi Kobayashi	AJKF, Lightweight Tournament 2004 2nd.STAGE	Tokyo, Japan	Decision (Unanimous)	3	3:00
2004-03-13	Win	(Japan) Hiroyuki Takaya	AJKF: "Strongest Tournament 2004 All Japan Lightweight 1st Stage"	Tokyo, Japan	Decision (Unanimous)	3	3:00
Lightweight Tournament opening round.
2004-01-04	Win	(Japan) Kenji Takemura	AJKF All Japan Kickboxing Federation "Wilderness"	Tokyo, Japan	Decision (Unanimous)	3	3:00
2003-11-23	Win	(Japan) Yoshikazu Murayama	AJKF All Japan Lightweight Championship "SCRAMBLE"	Tokyo, Japan	KO (Left cross)	1	1:32
2003-08-17	Loss	(Japan) Masahiro Yamamoto	AJKF: Hurricane Blow	Tokyo, Japan	TKO (cut)	2	2:43
2003-06-20	Win	(Japan) Rascal Taka	AJKF "DEAD HEAT"	Tokyo, Japan	Decision (Unanimous)	3	3:00
2002-12-18	Loss	(Japan) Genki Yamamoto	AJKF "BACK FROM HELL-II"	Tokyo, Japan	TKO (Doctor Stoppage)	1	
2002-10-17	Loss	(Japan) Kenji Takemura	AJKF "Brandnew Fight" - All Japan Featherweight Tournament Semi Finals	Tokyo, Japan	Decision (Unanimous)	3	3:00
2001-11-30	Win	(Japan) Shigeru Arata	AJKF All Japan Lightweight Championship "LIGHT ON!"	Tokyo, Japan	Decision (Unanimous)	3	3:00
2001-09-07	Win	(Japan) Akira Iwasa	AJKF All Japan Lightweight Championship "REVOLVER"	Tokyo, Japan	Decision (Unanimous)	3	3:00
2001-02-16	Win	(Japan) Tomoyuki Morishita	AJKF All Japan Lightweight Championship "BE WILD"	Tokyo, Japan	Decision (Unanimous)	3	3:00
2000-11-29	Win	(Japan) Yousuke Nakagome	AJKF All Japan Lightweight Championship "LEGEND-X" [Freshman Fight]	Tokyo, Japan	KO	2	2:39
1999-09-03	Win	(Japan) Hideki Akamatsu	AJKF All Japan Lightweight Championship "WAVE-VI"	Tokyo, Japan	KO	1	1:40
Legend: Win Loss Draw/No contest Notes
