= Tsogto Amara =

Mongolian kickboxer

- Born: Tsogtyn Amarbayasgalan; November 20, 1979 (age 46); Darkhan, Darkhan-Uul, Mongolia
- Native name: Цогтын Амарбаясгалан
- Other names: "Mongolian Hurricane"; Shinobu Amara 忍アマラ― アマラ忍
- Nationality: Mongolian
- Height: 1.71 m (5 ft 7 1/2 in)
- Weight: 68.2 kg (150 lb; 10.74 st)
- Division: Lightweight; Welterweight
- Style: Kyokushin Karate, Kickboxing
- Stance: Orthodox
- Fighting out of: Darkhan (city), Mongolia
- Rank: Black belt in Kyokushin Karate
- Years active: 2001–2018

Kickboxing record
- Total: 45
- Wins: 33
- By knockout: 11
- Losses: 12
- Draws: 0

Other information
- University: Josai International University

Tsogto Amara (Цогтын Амарбаясгалан, Tsogtyn Amarbayasgalan, born November 20, 1979) is a Lightweight Mongolian Kyokushin kickboxer who has fought in the All Japan Kickboxing Federation, Shoot Boxing, and K-1.

== Biography ==
Tsogto Amara was born in Darkhan, Mongolia on November 20, 1979. He was first introduced to martial arts in 1994 through some of his friends, which led him to train in Kyokushin Karate. During Amara's amateur career in his home country of Mongolia, he found a great deal of success in karate by winning the 1997 Domestic Kyokushin Championship and the 1998 Mongolian National Karate Championship. He then went on to compete in kickboxing after moving to Japan.

== Career ==
On June 18, 2004, in Tokyo, Japan, Amara defeated Samkor Kiatmontep by unanimous decision after an extra round to win the AJKF All Japan Lightweight Tournament championship at the tournament's final stage.

On January 4, 2005, also in Tokyo, Amara captured the AJKF Lightweight Championship belt by defeating Satoruvashicoba via unanimous decision at the AJKF "SURVIVOR" event.

== Championships and awards ==
Kickboxing

- All Japan Kickboxing Federation
  - 2004 All Japan Kickboxing Federation AJKF All Japan Lightweight Tournament 2004 FINAL STAGE, Final Champion
  - 2005 All Japan Kickboxing Federation AJKF Lightweight Champion
- KING COMBAT
  - 2002 KING COMBAT 60 kg tournament Champion
- Martial Arts Japan Kickboxing Federation
  - MA Japan Super Featherweight Champion
- WPMF
  - 2009 WPMF World Super Lightweight Champion

Karate

- Amateur
  - 1997 Domestic Kyokushin Champion (gold)
  - 1998 Mongolian National Karate Champion (gold)

== Kickboxing record ==
Kickboxing record
33 Wins (11 (T)KO's), 12 Losses
Date	Result	Opponent	Event	Location	Method	Round	Time
2018-06-10	Loss	(Japan) Takahiro Okuyama	Shoot Boxing 2018 act.3	Tokyo, Japan	Ext. R Decision (Unanimous)	3	3:00
2018-02-10	Win	(Japan) Kentaro Hokuto	Shoot Boxing 2018 act.1	Tokyo, Japan	Ext. R Decision (Majority)	4	3:00
2009-12-03	Loss	(Thailand) Thonglart	World Kings Of Muay-Thai Contend for Hegemony - LETS FIGHT II	Hong Kong	Decision	5	3:00
2009-03-29	Win	(Japan) Yusuke Sugawara	RISE 53	Tokyo, Japan	Decision (Unanimous)	3	3:00
2009-01-18	Loss	(Thailand) Attachai Fairtex	Muay Lok Japan 2009-The Greatest Muay Thai Festival-	Tokyo, Japan	Decision (Unanimous)	5	3:00
2008-12-09	Win	(Thailand) Kanpam	IMPERIAL 〜Teikoku〜	Mongolia	Decision (Unanimous)	5	3:00
Wins the WPMF World Super Lightweight title.
2008-06-08	Win	(Japan) Shinya Ishige	M-1 Fairtex Singha Beer Muay Thai Challenge "Legend of elbows 2008 ~MIND~"	Tokyo, Japan	TKO (Doctor Stoppage)	4	3:00
2008-02-29	Loss	(Japan) Yukihiro Komiya	J-NETWORK Let's Kick with J 1st	Tokyo, Japan	Decision (Majority)	3	3:00
2007-06-28	Loss	(Japan) Taishin Kohiruimaki	K-1 World MAX 2007 Tournament Final Elimination Super Fight	Tokyo, Japan	Decision (Unanimous)	3	3:00
2007-04-04	Win	(Mongolia) Jadamba Narantungalag	K-1 World MAX 2007 World Championship Final	Tokyo, Japan	Ext. R Decision (Unanimous)	4	3:00
2007-02-05	Loss	(Thailand) Buakaw Banchamek	K-1 World MAX 2007 Japan Tournament	Tokyo, Japan	Decision (Unanimous)	3	3:00
2006-12-22	Loss	(Thailand) Atapon Fairtex	Lumpinee Stadium	Bangkok, Thailand	Decision (Unanimous)	5	3:00
2006-09-04	Loss	(New Zealand) Jordan Tai	K-1 World MAX 2006 Champions Challenge	Tokyo, Japan	Decision (Unanimous)	3	3:00
2006-07-07	Loss	(Japan) Koichi Kikuchi	SHOOT BOXING 2006 NEO ΟΡΘΡΟΖ Series 4th	Tokyo, Japan	Decision (Majority)	5	3:00
2006-04-05	Loss	(Netherlands) Andy Souwer	K-1 World MAX 2006 World Tournament Open	Tokyo, Japan	Ext. R Decision (Unanimous)	4	3:00
2006-01-09	Win	(Japan) Tomo Kiire	J-NETWORK GO! GO! J-NET '06 〜Light my fire!〜	Tokyo, Japan	TKO (Doctor Stoppage)	5	1:19
2005-11-05	Win	(South Korea) Kim Young Sang	All Japan Kickboxing Federation “Rock'n Roll☆U5 FIGHT☆Hill it!”	Tokyo, Japan	KO (Punch)	3	1:19
2005-08-14	Win	(Korea) Hong Hyung-sik	Martial Arts Japan Kickboxing Federation "DETERMINATION ≪Kesshin≫ 7 KICK GUTS 2005"	Tokyo, Japan	Decision (Unanimous)	3	3:00
2005-06-24	Win	(Japan) Makoto Nishiyama	Martial Arts Japan Kickboxing Federation "DETERMINATION 5- Battlefield Tiger-"	Tokyo, Japan	Decision (Unanimous)	5	3:00
2005-04-17	Win	(Japan) Mitsumasa Nogawa	All Japan Kickboxing Federation "NEVER GIVE UP"	Tokyo, Japan	Ext. R Decision (Unanimous)	6	3:00
2005-01-04	Win	(Japan) Satoruvashicoba	AJKF “SURVIVOR” All Japan Lightweight Championship	Tokyo, Japan	Decision (Unanimous)	5	3:00
Wins the AJKF All Japan Lightweight Championship.
2004-11-19	Win	(Japan) Ryo Kaito	All Japan Kickboxing FederationThe Championship	Tokyo, Japan	TKO (3 Knockdowns)	3	1:55
2004-09-23	Win	(Greece) Marios Karalis	All Japan Kickboxing FederationDANGER ZONE	Tokyo, Japan	KO (Right High Kick)	3	0:13
2004-06-18	Win	(Thailand) Samkor Kiatmontep	AJKF All Japan Lightweight Tournament 2004 FINAL STAGE, Final	Tokyo, Japan	Ext.R Decision (Unanimous)	6	3:00
Wins the AJKF All Japan Lightweight Tournament 2004 Championship.
2004-06-18	Win	(Japan) Koji Yoshimoto	AJKF All Japan Lightweight Tournament 2004, Semi-Finals	Tokyo, Japan	Decision (majority)	5	3:00
2004-05-09	Win	(Japan) Yuichi Nagumo	Martial Arts Japan Kickboxing Federation "Togane Jim 26th anniversary SUPREME-3 ~Battlefield Tiger~"	Tokyo, Japan	Decision (majority)	3	3:00
2004-04-16	Win	(Japan) Masahiro Yamamoto	AJKF All Japan Lightweight Tournament 2004, Quarter Finals	Tokyo, Japan	Decision (majority)	3	3:00
2003-09-27	Loss	(Thailand) Kongpipop Petchyindee	All Japan Kickboxing Federation KNOCK DOWN	Tokyo, Japan	Decision (Unanimous)	5	3:00
2003-05-23	Loss	(Japan) Haruaki Otsuki	All Japan Kickboxing Federation All Japan Lightweight's Strongest Tournament - Finals	Tokyo, Japan	TKO (Doctor Stoppage, Cut)	2	0:37
2003-05-23	Win	(Japan) Satoshi Kobayashi	All Japan Kickboxing Federation All Japan Lightweight's Strongest Tournament - Semi Finals	Tokyo, Japan	Decision (Majority)	3	3:00
2003-03-08	Win	(Japan) Yuya Yamamoto	All Japan Kickboxing Federation All Japan Lightweight's Strongest Tournament - 1st Round	Tokyo, Japan	Ext. R Decision (Unanimous)	5	3:00
2002-12-08	Win	(Japan) Susumu Daiguji	All Japan Kickboxing Federation "BACK FROM HELL-II"	Tokyo, Japan	KO (Left High Kick)	2	2:34
2002-09-06	Win	(Japan) Kuramasa Makoto	All Japan Kickboxing Federation "GOLDEN TRIGGER"	Tokyo, Japan	Decision (Unanimous)	5	3:00
2002-06-16	Win	(Japan) Masayuki Sunada	All Japan Kickboxing Federation “Who's Next 02”	Tokyo, Japan	Decision (Unanimous)	5	3:00
2002-04-28	Win	(Japan) Maesawa Yoshinori	Martial Arts Japan Kickboxing Federation "In search of the strongest! "Starting and decisive battle""	Tokyo, Japan	KO (Hook to the Body)	5	2:07
Wins the MA Japan Super Featherweight Championship.
2002-03-30	Win	(Japan) Takahiko Seki	Martial Arts Japan Kickboxing Federation KING COMBAT-2002-KICK BOXING 60 kg Tournament, Final	Tokyo, Japan	Decision (Unanimous)	3	3:00
Wins the KING COMBAT 2002 60 kg tournament Championship.
2002-03-30	Win	(Japan) Umeshita Yuuki	Martial Arts Japan Kickboxing Federation KING COMBAT-2002-KICK BOXING 60 kg Tournament, Semi Finals	Tokyo, Japan	KO (Kick to the body)	3	0:38
2002-03-30	Win	(Japan) Susumu Daiguji	Martial Arts Japan Kickboxing Federation KING COMBAT-2002-KICK BOXING 60 kg Tournament, Quarter Finals	Tokyo, Japan	Ext. R Decision (Unanimous)	3	3:00
2002-01-18	Win	(Japan) Kazu Kudo	Martial Arts Japan Kickboxing Federation (Shidokan) "New Year Festival"	Tokyo, Japan	Decision (Unanimous)	5	3:00
2001-11-03	Win	(Japan) Tetsunari Amano	Martial Arts Japan Kickboxing Federation "ADVANCE-1"	Tokyo, Japan	Decision (Unanimous)	5	3:00
2001-09-29	Win	(Japan) Kinzo~	Martial Arts Japan Kickboxing Federation "ODYSSEY-4"	Tokyo, Japan	Decision (Unanimous)	4	3:00
2001-07-13	Win	(Japan) Murosaki Gosho	Martial Arts Japan Kickboxing Federation "Kick Guts 2001"	Tokyo, Japan	Decision (Unanimous)	4	3:00
2001-06-24	Win	(Japan) Yuji Kitano	Martial Arts Japan Kickboxing Federation "Dream Produce Midday Duel"	Tokyo, Japan	KO	2	1:58
2001-05-20	Win	(Japan) Takahiro Masahiro	Martial Arts Japan Kickboxing Federation “In Search of the Strongest! World Conquest”	Tokyo, Japan	KO	1	1:17
2001-05-04	Win	(Japan) Jiro Ikeya	Martial Arts Japan Kickboxing Federation	Tokyo, Japan	KO	1	1:30
Legend: Win Loss Draw/No contest Notes
