= Nontachai Sit-O =

Thai former professional Muay Thai fighter

Nontachai
- Born: Non Sukkasaweng; February 23, 1984 (age 42); Buriram, Thailand
- Native name: นนที สุดแสาง
- Other names: Nontachai Kiatwanlop (นนทชัย เกียรติวัลลภ)
- Nickname: Lord Iron Chopstick Knees (ขุนเข่าตะเกียบเหล็ก)
- Height: 175 cm (5 ft 9 in)
- Division: Super Bantamweight; Super Featherweight; Lightweight; Middleweight
- Style: Muay Thai (Muay Khao)
- Stance: Orthodox
- Team: Sit-O; Tiger Muay Thai
- Trainer: Taweesak Sit-O
- Years active: c. 1993–2013

Other information
- Occupation: Muay Thai trainer

Non Sukkasaweng (Thai: นนที สุดแสาง; born February 23, 1984), known professionally as Nontachai Sit-O (Thai: นนทชัย ศิษย์โอ), is a Thai former professional Muay Thai fighter. He is a former Lumpinee Stadium and Rajadamnern Stadium champion across two divisions.

== Biography and career ==
Nontachai started Muay Thai training at the age of 9 and immediately competed to provide financial help to his family. He joined the Sit O camp in the city of Buriram a few years later.

After his retirement Nontachai became a trainer at the Sit-O camp he then joined Tiger Muay Thai where he coached and competed on the Phuket scene. In 2014 he joined Evolve in Singapore as a coach.

== Titles and accomplishments ==
- Lumpinee Stadium
  - Lumpinee Stadium Super Bantamweight (122 lbs) Champion
  - Lumpinee Stadium Fighter of the Year
- Rajadamnern Stadium
  - 2007 Rajadamnern Stadium Middleweight (160 lbs) Champion
- Professional Boxing Association of Thailand (PAT)
  - 2002 Thailand Super Featherweight (130 lbs) Champion

== Muay Thai record ==
Muay Thai record
Date	Result	Opponent	Event	Location	Method	Round	Time
2013-11-18	Win	(France) Malik Aliane	Bangla Stadium	Phuket, Thailand	Decision (Unanimous)	5	3:00
Wins PK-1 title.
2011-12-30	Win	(Brazil) Thiago Teixeira	Bangla Stadium	Phuket, Thailand	TKO (Doctor stoppage)	2	
Wins Bangla Stadium title.
2011-08-10	Win	(Netherlands) Tony J.Prapa	Bangla Stadium	Phuket, Thailand	KO (Knee to the body)	3	
2008-02-04	Loss	(Thailand) Diesellek Rungruangyon	Daorungchujaroen, Rajadamnern Stadium	Bangkok, Thailand	Decision	5	3:00
2008-01-03	Win	(Thailand) Lamsongkram Chuwattana	Rajadamnern Stadium	Bangkok, Thailand	Decision	5	3:00
2007-06-30	Win	(France) Salahdine Ait-naceur	Gala France-Thailande	France	Decision	5	3:00
2007-05-28	Loss	(Thailand) Naruepol Fairtex	Daorungchujaroenn, Rajadamnern Stadium	Bangkok, Thailand	Decision	5	3:00
2007-03-29	Win	(Thailand) Lamsongkram Chuwattana	Rajadamnern Stadium	Bangkok, Thailand	Decision	5	3:00
Wins Rajadamnern Stadium Middleweight (160 lbs) title.
2006-12-10	Win	(Thailand) Big Ben Chor Rachadakon	Rajadamnern Stadium	Bangkok, Thailand	Decision	5	3:00
2006-07-16	Loss	(Thailand) Chaowalit Jocky Gym	Channel 7 Stadium	Bangkok, Thailand	KO	3	
2006-05-14	Loss	(Thailand) Naruepol Fairtex	Channel 7 Stadium	Bangkok, Thailand	Decision	5	3:00
2005-10-21	Loss	(Thailand) Namsaknoi Yudthagarngamtorn	Lumpinee Champion Krikkrai, Lumpinee Stadium	Bangkok, Thailand	Decision (Unanimous)	5	3:00
For the Lumpinee Stadium Lightweight (135 lbs) title.
2005-09-02	Win	(Thailand) Danthai Singmanasak	Saengmorakot, Lumpinee Stadium	Bangkok, Thailand	Decision	5	3:00
2005-08-09	Win	(Thailand) Danthai Singmanasak	Saengsawang, Lumpinee Stadium	Bangkok, Thailand	Decision	5	3:00
2005-01-13	Win	(Thailand) Noppadet Sengsimew Gym	Bangrachan, Rajadamnern Stadium	Bangkok, Thailand	Decision	5	3:00
2004-09-03	Loss	(Thailand) Namsaknoi Yudthagarngamtorn	Por.Pramuk, Lumpinee Stadium	Bangkok, Thailand	Decision (Unanimous)	5	3:00
For the Lumpinee Stadium Lightweight (135 lbs) title.
2004-07-22	Win	(Thailand) Banpot Sor.Romyanon	Phetsupapan, Rajadamnern Stadium	Bangkok, Thailand	KO	4	
2004-06-01	Win	(Thailand) Khunsuk Phetsupaphan	Phetsupapan, Lumpinee Stadium	Bangkok, Thailand	KO	4	
2004-03-29	Win	(Thailand) Patak Sor Chulasen	Rajadamnern Stadium	Bangkok, Thailand	Decision	5	3:00
2003-12-30	Win	(France) Moussa Konaté	Lumpinee Muay Thai Gaala	Helsinki, Finland	Decision	5	3:00
2003-09-30	Loss	(Thailand) Noppadet Sengsimew Gym	Lumpinee Stadium	Bangkok, Thailand	Decision	5	3:00
2003-08-21	Draw	(Thailand) Noppadet Sengsimew Gym	Bangrachan, Lumpinee Stadium	Bangkok, Thailand	Decision	5	3:00
2003-06-03	Win	(Thailand) Petchnamek Sor Siriwat	Petchyindee, Lumpinee Stadium	Bangkok, Thailand	Decision	5	3:00
2003-04-08	Loss	(Thailand) Buakaw Por.Pramuk	Lumpinee Stadium	Bangkok, Thailand	TKO	3	
2003-03-04	Win	(Thailand) Khunsuk Phetsupaphan	Phetsupapan, Lumpinee Stadium	Bangkok, Thailand	Decision	5	3:00
2003-01-14	Win	(Thailand) Samkor Kiatmontep	Petchpanomrung, Lumpinee Stadium	Bangkok, Thailand	Decision	5	3:00
2002-12-03	Win	(Thailand) Orono Majestic Gym	Lumpinee Stadium	Bangkok, Thailand	Decision	5	3:00
Wins the Thailand Super Featherweight (130 lbs) title.
2002-09-27	Win	(Thailand) Banpot Sor Romyanon	Petchyindee, Lumpinee Stadium	Bangkok, Thailand	Decision	5	3:00
2002-08-06	Loss	(Thailand) Orono Majestic Gym	Petchyindee, Lumpinee Stadium	Bangkok, Thailand	Decision	5	3:00
2002-07-05	Draw	(Thailand) Orono Majestic Gym	Petchyindee, Lumpinee Stadium	Bangkok, Thailand	Decision	5	3:00
2002-04-26	Loss	(Thailand) Thongthai Por.Burapha	Lumpinee Stadium	Bangkok, Thailand	Decision	5	3:00
2002-03-22	Loss	(Thailand) Samkor Kiatmontep	Petchyindee, Lumpinee Stadium	Bangkok, Thailand	Decision	5	3:00
For the Lumpinee Stadium Super Featherweight (130 lbs) title.
2001-12-07	Loss	(Thailand) Samkor Chor.Rathchatasupak	Lumpinee Stadium	Bangkok, Thailand	Decision	5	3:00
2001-10-17	Win	(Thailand) Watcharachai Kaewsamrit	Daorung Chujaroen, Rajadamnern Stadium	Bangkok, Thailand	Decision	5	3:00
2001-06-15	Win	(Thailand) Charlie Sor Chaitamin	Lumpinee Stadium	Bangkok, Thailand	Decision	5	3:00
2001-05-25	Win	(Thailand) Yodbuangam Lukbanyai	Phetsupapan, Lumpinee Stadium	Bangkok, Thailand	Decision	5	3:00
2001-04-10	Win	(Thailand) Yodbuangam Lukbanyai	Lumpinee Stadium	Bangkok, Thailand	Decision	5	3:00
2001-03-23	Win	(Thailand) Chachanakon Por.Burapha	Lumpinee Stadium	Bangkok, Thailand	Decision	5	3:00
2001-02-06	Win	(Thailand) Suriya Thungyaiwittayakom	Lumpinee Stadium	Bangkok, Thailand	Decision	5	3:00
2001-01-06	Draw	(Thailand) Ekasit Sitkriengkrai	Lumpinee Stadium	Bangkok, Thailand	Decision	5	3:00
2000-12-08	Win	(Thailand) Komsaen Tor.Saengkaew	Lumpinee Stadium	Bangkok, Thailand	Decision	5	3:00
2000-11-17	Loss	(Thailand) Sanghiran Lukbanyai	Lumpinee Stadium	Bangkok, Thailand	KO	2	
Loses the Lumpinee Stadium Super Bantamweight (122 lbs) title and fails to capture the Thailand Super Bantamweight (122 lbs) title.
2000-10-27	Win	(Thailand) Srisomdet Lukjaopomaesak	Lumpinee Stadium	Bangkok, Thailand	Decision	5	3:00
2000-10-01	Win	(Thailand) Surachai Sakjawee	Channel 7 Stadium	Bangkok, Thailand	Decision	5	3:00
2000-09-19	Loss	(Thailand) Pornsiri Luksirichai	Lumpinee Stadium	Bangkok, Thailand	Decision	5	3:00
For a 400,000 baht side-bet.
2000-08-29	Win	(Thailand) Nuapathapee Chengsiew Gym	Lumpinee Stadium	Bangkok, Thailand	Decision	5	3:00
2000-05-23	Win	(Thailand) Denchai Lukbanyai	Lumpinee Stadium	Bangkok, Thailand	Decision	5	3:00
2000-04-11	Loss	(Thailand) Chalermpon Kiatsunata	Lumpinee Stadium	Bangkok, Thailand	Decision	5	3:00
Legend: Win Loss Draw/No contest Notes

== See also ==
- List of male kickboxers
