= Ritthichai Lookchaomaesaitong =

Thai Muay Thai kickboxer

- Born: Ritthichai Sornsiri; February 11, 1968 (age 58); Thoen, Lampang, Thailand
- Other names: Cruel Miao (แม้วทมิฬ)
- Division: Mini Flyweight; Featherweight
- Style: Muay Thai (Muay Khao)
- Stance: Orthodox
- Team: Lookchaomaesaitong; Sor.Ploenjit

Other information
- Occupation: Police officer

Ritthichai Sornsiri (born February 11, 1968), known professionally as Ritthichai Lookchaomaesaitong (Thai: ฤทธิชัย ลูกเจ้าแม่ทรายทอง) is a Thai former professional Muay Thai fighter. He is a former two-time Lumpinee Stadium title challenger and two-time Rajadamnern Stadium title challenger who was active during the 1980s and 1990s.

== Biography and career ==
=== Early life ===
Lookchaomaesaitong was born in Thoen district, Lampang province, Thailand. He began fighting at the age of 15 and received only 100 baht.

=== Muay Thai career ===
He was in about 200 fights, having faced many contemporary famed kickboxers such as Wangchannoi Sor Palangchai, the twins Boonlai–Boonlong Sor.Thanikul, Cherry Sor Wanich, Pompetch Naratrikul, Orono Por Muang Ubon, Mathee Jadeepitak, Charoenwit Kiatbanchong, Samranthong Kiatbanchong and Superlek Sorn E-Sarn.

The highest value he ever received was 190,000 baht. His most impressive fight was his knockout win over Boonlai Sor. Thanikul. Ritthichai hailed Mathee Jadeepitak as his toughest opponent.

=== Life after Muay Thai ===
After retiring from kickboxing, he served as a non-commissioned police officer in Tak province.

== Titles and honours ==
- Channel 8 Lampang
  - Mini Flyweight (105 lbs) Champion

== Fight record ==
Muay Thai record
Date	Result	Opponent	Event	Location	Method	Round	Time
1997-	Loss	(Thailand) Jompoplek Sor.Sumalee	Lumpinee Stadium	Bangkok, Thailand	Decision	5	3:00
1996-12-12	Win	(Thailand) Sangkhom Thamachat	Lumpinee Stadium	Bangkok, Thailand	Decision	5	3:00
1995-05-05	Loss	(Thailand) Samkor Chor.Rathchatasupak	Lumpinee Stadium	Bangkok, Thailand	Decision	5	3:00
1995-03-24	Loss	(Thailand) Mathee Jadeepitak	Lumpinee Stadium	Bangkok, Thailand	Decision (unanimous)	5	3:00
For the Lumpinee Stadium Featherweight (126 lbs) title.
1995-02-27	Win	(Thailand) Jompoplek Sor.Sumalee	Rajadamnern Stadium	Bangkok, Thailand	Decision	5	3:00
1994-07-31	Win	(Thailand) Thammawit Sakhomsil	Lumpinee Stadium	Bangkok, Thailand	Decision	5	3:00
1994-06-28	Loss	(Thailand) Mathee Jadeepitak	Lumpinee Stadium	Bangkok, Thailand	Decision	5	3:00
1994-01-31	Loss	(Thailand) Superlek Sornisaan	Rajadamnern Stadium	Bangkok, Thailand	Decision	5	3:00
1993-12-	Loss	(Thailand) Nuathroanee Thongracha	Lumpinee Stadium	Bangkok, Thailand	Decision	5	3:00
1993-10-22	Win	(Thailand) Boonlai Sor.Thanikul	Lumpinee Stadium	Bangkok, Thailand	KO (Right high kick)	2	
1993-09-11	Win	(Thailand) Cherry Sor Wanich	Lumpinee Stadium	Bangkok, Thailand	Decision	5	3:00
1993-	Win	(Thailand) Pomphet Naratreekul	Lumpinee Stadium	Bangkok, Thailand	Decision	5	3:00
1993-	Loss	(Thailand) Samkor Chor.Rathchatasupak	Lumpinee Stadium	Bangkok, Thailand	Decision	5	3:00
1993-06-	Loss	(Thailand) Mathee Jadeepitak	Lumpinee Stadium	Bangkok, Thailand	Decision	5	3:00
1993-04-30	Win	(Thailand) Cherry Sor Wanich	Lumpinee Stadium	Bangkok, Thailand	Decision	5	3:00
1993-03-16	Win	(Thailand) Wangchannoi Sor Palangchai	Lumpinee Stadium	Bangkok, Thailand	Decision	5	3:00
1993-01-	Win	(Thailand) Pomphet Naratreekul	Lumpinee Stadium	Bangkok, Thailand	Decision	5	3:00
1992-11-29	Loss	(Netherlands) Ramon Dekkers		Lampang Province	Decision	5	3:00
1992-08-18	NC	(Thailand) Phanomrung Por.Pisitchet	Lumpinee Stadium	Bangkok, Thailand	(fighters dismissed)	3	
1992-07-27	Win	(Thailand) Pomphet Naratreekul	Lumpinee Stadium	Bangkok, Thailand	Decision	5	3:00
1992-06-23	Loss	(Thailand) Buakaw Sit SorPor.	Lumpinee Stadium	Bangkok, Thailand	Decision	5	3:00
1992-05-29	Loss	(Thailand) Oley Kiatoneway	Lumpinee Stadium	Bangkok, Thailand	Decision	5	3:00
1992-04-24	Loss	(Thailand) Oley Kiatoneway	Lumpinee Stadium	Bangkok, Thailand	Decision	5	3:00
1992-02-28	Win	(Thailand) Superlek Sornisaan		Samut Prakan, Thailand	Decision	5	3:00
1992-01-06	Win	(Thailand) Saennapha Fairtex		Thailand	Decision	5	3:00
1991-12-03	NC	(Thailand) Kawnar Sor Kettalingchan		Thailand	Ref.stop	5	
1991-11-01	Win	(Thailand) Boonlong Sor Thanikul	Lumpinee Stadium	Bangkok, Thailand	KO (Knee to the head)	4	
1991-09-13	Win	(Thailand) Samranthong Kiatbanchong		Thailand	Decision	5	3:00
1991-08-10	Win	(Thailand) Rainbow Sor.Prantalay		Thailand	Decision	5	3:00
1991-07-09	Loss	(Thailand) Thanooin Chor.Cheuchart		Songkhla, Thailand	Decision	5	3:00
1991-06-08	NC	(Thailand) Kahewa Chor.Rachachat		Thailand	Ref.stop (fighters dismissed)	5	
1991-05-05	Loss	(Thailand) Samingnoi Kiatkamchai		Lampang province, Thailand	Decision	5	3:00
1991-03-22	Loss	(Thailand) Samingnoi Kiatkamchai		Bangkok, Thailand	TKO	3	
1991-02-09	Loss	(Thailand) Samranthong Kiatbanchong	Lumpinee Stadium	Bangkok, Thailand	TKO (Doctor stoppage)	3	
1991-01-21	Win	(Thailand) Orono Por Muang Ubon	Lumpinee Stadium	Bangkok, Thailand	Decision	5	3:00
1990-12-07	Win	(Thailand) Sanit Wichitkriengkrai	Lumpinee Stadium	Bangkok, Thailand	Decision	5	3:00
1990-11-17	Win	(Thailand) Thanooin Chor.Cheuchart	Lumpinee Stadium	Bangkok, Thailand	TKO (Doctor stoppage)	2	
1990-10-27	Win	(Thailand) Detsak Sakpradu		Bangkok, Thailand	Decision	5	3:00
1990-09-29	Loss	(Thailand) Roj Lukrangsi		Bangkok, Thailand	Decision	5	3:00
1990-09-08	Win	(Thailand) Kawnar Sor Kettalingchan	Lumpinee Stadium	Thailand	Decision	5	3:00
1990-08-11	Win	(Thailand) Songkiat Sor.Thanikul	Lumpinee Stadium	Bangkok, Thailand	TKO	4	
1990-07-21	Loss	(Thailand) Samranthong Kiatbanchong	Lumpinee Stadium	Bangkok, Thailand	Decision	5	3:00
1990-06-29	Loss	(Thailand) Nuathoranee Thongracha		Chiang Mai, Thailand	Decision	5	3:00
1990-06-02	Loss	(Thailand) Kongpataya Sityodtong		Thailand	Decision	5	3:00
1990-04-28	Win	(Thailand) Thanooin Chor.Cheuchart		Bangkok, Thailand	Decision	5	3:00
1990-04-14	Win	(Thailand) Thammawit Saksamut		Bangkok, Thailand	Decision	5	3:00
1990-03-19	Loss	(Thailand) Kongtoranee Payakaroon	Rajadamnern Stadium	Bangkok, Thailand	Decision	5	3:00
1990-02-21	Win	(Thailand) Detsak Sakpradu	Rajadamnern Stadium	Bangkok, Thailand	Decision	5	3:00
1990-01-27	Win	(Thailand) Den Muangsurin		Thailand	KO (Elbow)	2	
1990-01-01	Win	(Thailand) Kongpataya Sityodtong		Thailand	Decision	5	3:00
1989-12-15	Loss	(Thailand) Detsak Sakpradu		Bangkok, Thailand	Decision	5	3:00
1989-10-31	Loss	(Thailand) Roj Lukrangsi		Bangkok, Thailand	Decision	5	3:00
1989-09-22	Loss	(Thailand) Koratnoi Sakphiphat		Thailand	Decision	5	3:00
1989-07-25	Win	(Thailand) Detsak Sakpradu	Lumpinee Stadium	Bangkok, Thailand	Decision	5	3:00
1989-06-26	Loss	(Thailand) Panomrunglek Chor.Sawat	Lumpinee Stadium	Bangkok, Thailand	Decision	5	3:00
1989-06-06	Win	(Thailand) Annaket Tor.Sitthichai	Lumpinee Stadium	Bangkok, Thailand	Decision	5	3:00
1989-05-06	Win	(Thailand) Roj Lukrangsi		Bangkok, Thailand	Decision	5	3:00
1989-03-28	Win	(Thailand) Superlek Sorn E-Sarn	Lumpinee Stadium	Bangkok, Thailand	Decision	5	3:00
1989-03-10	Win	(Thailand) Detsak Sakpradu		Bangkok, Thailand	TKO	3	
1989-02-07	Win	(Thailand) Champhet Kiatsunthon		Bangkok, Thailand	Decision	5	3:00
1989-01-23	Loss	(Thailand) Superlek Sorn E-Sarn	Rajadamnern Stadium	Bangkok, Thailand	Decision	5	3:00
1989-01-10	Win	(Thailand) Lukkiad Muangsurin		Bangkok, Thailand	KO (High kick)	1	
1988-11-25	Loss	(Thailand) Therdkiat Sitthepitak	Lumpinee Stadium	Bangkok, Thailand	Decision	5	3:00
1988-08-18	Loss	(Thailand) Kawnar Sor.Kettalingchan	Lumpinee Stadium	Bangkok, Thailand	Decision	5	3:00
1988-04-05	Win	(Thailand) Kopho Sitchanyut	Lumpinee Stadium	Bangkok, Thailand	Decision	5	3:00
1988-02-02	Loss	(Thailand) Dennuea Denmolee	Lumpinee Stadium	Bangkok, Thailand	Decision	5	3:00
Legend: Win Loss Draw/No contest Notes
