= Samkor Kiatmontep =

Thai former professional Muay Thai fighter and kickboxer

- Born: Somsak Nuansai; April 4, 1975 (age 51); Prakhon Chai, Buriram, Thailand
- Native name: สมศักดิ์ นวลสาย
- Other names: Samkor Chor.Rathchatasupak (สามกอ ช.รัชตสุภัค)
- Nickname: Batman (ไอ้ค้างคาว); Maew
- Height: 172 cm (5 ft 8 in)
- Division: Light Flyweight; Super Bantamweight; Featherweight; Super Featherweight; Lightweight; Super Welterweight
- Reach: 172 cm (68 in)
- Style: Muay Thai (Muay Bouk / Muay Tae)
- Stance: Southpaw
- Team: Chor.Rathchatasupak Gym; Kiatmontep Gym; Sit Boonmee; Decharat
- Years active: c. 1988–2012

Kickboxing record
- Total: 220
- Wins: 187
- Losses: 30
- Draws: 3

Other information
- Occupation: Muay Thai fighter (retired); Muay Thai trainer
- Children: 1

Somsak Nuansai (Thai: สมศักดิ์ นวลสาย; born April 4, 1975), known professionally as Samkor Kiatmontep and Samkor Chor.Rathchatasupak (Thai: สามกอ เกียรติมนต์เทพ, สามกอ ช.รัชตสุภัค), is a Thai former professional Muay Thai fighter and kickboxer. He is a former three-division Lumpinee Stadium champion who was famous in the 1990s and 2000s. Nicknamed "The Bat", he was especially known for his devastating left kicks.

== Biography ==
He is the youngest of his parents' three children. As a child, he loved playing football, with his favourite football club being Liverpool. He was a footballer and runner who represented his school. He had ambitions to become a Thailand national football team player and had no interest in Muay Thai.

However, at the age of 13, he was persuaded to become a Muay Thai fighter by his physical education teacher. His first fight earned him just 20 baht. He then moved to Chor.Rathchatasupak Gym in the city of Buriram to practice Muay Thai and began using the name "Samkor Chor.Rathchatasupak".

In his heyday, he was known for having the most powerful kicks among Thai kickboxers.

Samkor competed in a total of 225 fights with 187 wins, 30 losses and 3 draws. His highest value fight was more than 200,000 baht. He retired from boxing at the age of 37 in 2012. During his retirement, he has traveled as a Muay Thai trainer in both Japan and Hong Kong.

== Titles and accomplishments ==
- Lumpinee Stadium
  - 1995 Lumpinee Stadium Super Bantamweight (122 lbs) Champion
  - 1998 Lumpinee Stadium Lightweight (135 lbs) Champion
  - 2000 Lumpinee Stadium Super Featherweight (130 lbs) Champion
    - Two successful title defenses
- Professional Boxing Association of Thailand (PAT)
  - 1997 Thailand Lightweight (135 lbs) Champion
- All Japan Kickboxing Federation
  - 2004 AJKF Lightweight (135 lbs) Tournament Runner-Up
- Toyota Marathon
  - 2005 Toyota Marathon Super Welterweight (154 lbs) Tournament Winner
- World Muay Thai Council
  - 2011 WMC Super Welterweight (154 lbs) Champion

== Fight record ==
Professional Muay Thai & Kickboxing Record
276 Wins, 66 Losses, 2 Draws
Date	Result	Opponent	Event	Location	Method	Round	Time
2012-03-08	Loss	(Belarus) Denis Varaska	Fight Nights: Battle Of Moscow 6	Moscow, Russia	Decision (Unanimous)	3	3:00
2011-11-26	Loss	(Ukraine) Ruslan Kushnirenko	WKN Big 8 Tournament, Quarter Final	Minsk, Belarus	Decision	3	3:00
2011-05-31	Win	(Belarus) Denis Varaska	Fight Factory	Hong Kong	Decision (Unanimous)	5	3:00
Wins the WMC Super Welterweight (154 lbs) title.
2009-12-12	Loss	(Germany) Viktor Dick	Backstreet Fights II	Germany	Decision	3	3:00
2009-11-21	Loss	(France) Malik Mangouchi	The Star of Thai Boxing N°4	Belgium	Decision	5	3:00
2008-07-26	Loss	(Japan) Yutaro Yamauchi	AJKF Reverse×Rebirth	Tokyo, Japan	Decision (Majority)	5	3:00
2008-06-22	Win	(Japan) Yuya Yamamoto	AJKF Norainu Dengekisakusen	Tokyo, Japan	Decision (Split)	5	3:00
2007-09-29	Win	(Netherlands) Ray Staring	AJKF Road to 70's	Tokyo, Japan	KO (Left High Kick)	2	2:08
2007-06-16	Loss	(France) Farid Villaume	The Night of the Superfights VIII	Paris, France	TKO (Referee Stoppage)	4	
2007-04-07	Loss	(Netherlands) Chahid Oulad El Hadj	Balans Fight Night	Tilburg, Netherlands	Decision	5	3:00
2006-12-02	Loss	(Netherlands) Marco Piqué	Janus Fight Night 2006, Semi Finals	Padua, Italy	Decision	3	3:00
2006-12-02	Win	(France) Rafik Bakkouri	Janus Fight Night 2006, Quarter Finals	Padua, Italy	Decision (Split)	3	3:00
2006-11-18	Loss	(France) Morad Sari	France vs Thaïlande	Levallois-Perret, France	Decision	5	3:00
2006-08-19	Win	(United Kingdom) David Pacquette	Muaythai Legends - England VS Thailand	United Kingdom	Decision (Split)	3	3:00
2006-05-25	Loss	(France) Wilfried Montagne	Le grand Tournoi	Paris, France	Decision	5	2:00
2006-03-02	Loss	(France) Wilfried Montagne	France vs Thaïlande	France	DQ	1	
2006-01-06	Draw	(Russia) Arslan Magomedov	The Supreme Champions Of Muay Thai	Hong Kong	Decision	5	3:00
2005-12-05	Win	(United Kingdom) Phil Mcalpine	King's Birthday	Bangkok, Thailand	Decision	5	3:00
2005-10-29	Win	(Japan) Kazuya Masaki	NO KICK, NO LIFE 〜FINAL〜	Tokyo, Japan	Decision (Split)	5	3:00
2005-09-06	Loss	(Thailand) Yodsanklai Fairtex	Petchyindee Fights, Lumpinee Stadium	Bangkok, Thailand	Decision (Unanimous)	5	3:00
For the Thailand Super Welterweight (154 lbs) title.
2005-06-07	Win	(Korea) Jeong Eun-Cheon	KOMA	South Korea	TKO		
2005-	Win	(Canada) Jovan Stojanovski	Lumpinee Stadium	Bangkok, Thailand	KO	2	
2004-06-18	Loss	(Mongolia) Tsogto Amara	AJKF All Japan Lightweight Tournament 2004 FINAL STAGE, Final	Tokyo, Japan	Ext.R Decision (Unanimous)	6	3:00
For the AJKF All Japan Lightweight Tournament 2004 Championship.
2004-06-18	Win	(Japan) Satoruvashicoba	AJKF All Japan Lightweight Tournament 2004 FINAL STAGE, Semi Final	Tokyo, Japan	Decision (Unanimous)	3	3:00
2004-01-04	Win	(Japan) Masaaki Kato	AJKF Wilderness	Tokyo, Japan	Decision (Split)	5	3:00
2003-12-09	Loss	(Thailand) Singdam Kiatmuu9	Lumpinee Stadium	Bangkok, Thailand	Decision	5	3:00
2003-11-14	Loss	(Thailand) Singdam Kiatmuu9	Lumpinee Stadium	Bangkok, Thailand	Decision	5	3:00
2003-08-31	Win	(United Kingdom) Rick Well	KOMA: King Of Martial Arts 2003	Seoul, South Korea	TKO	1	
2003-07-20	Win	(France) Abdoulaye M'Baye	AJKF KICK OUT	Tokyo, Japan	KO (Left Middle Kick)	3	1:24
2003-	Win	(Thailand) Attachai Fairtex	Lumpinee Stadium	Bangkok, Thailand	Decision	5	3:00
2003-05-02	Win	(Thailand) Khunsuk Phetsupaphan	Lumpinee Stadium	Bangkok, Thailand	Decision	5	3:00
2003-04-14		(Thailand) Singdam Kiatmuu9	Lumpinee Stadium	Bangkok, Thailand			
2003-03-28	Loss	(Thailand) Khunsuk Phetsupaphan	Lumpinee Stadium	Bangkok, Thailand	Decision	5	3:00
2003-02-07	Win	(Japan) Hisayuki Kanazawa	AJKF RED ZONE	Tokyo, Japan	KO (Left Elbow)	3	0:49
2003-01-14	Loss	(Thailand) Nontachai Kiatwanlop	Petchpanomrung, Lumpinee Stadium	Bangkok, Thailand	Decision	5	3:00
2002-11-05	Win	(Thailand) Huasai Oldweightgym	Lumpinee Stadium	Bangkok, Thailand	Decision	5	3:00
2002-09-06	Win	(Japan) Satoshi Kobayashi	A.J.K.F. GOLDEN TRIGGER	Tokyo, Japan	KO (Low Kicks)	3	2:10
2002-07-05	Win	(Thailand) Thongthai Por.Burapha	Lumpinee Stadium	Bangkok, Thailand	TKO (Doctor Stoppage)	4	
2002-05-23	Win	(Thailand) Nongbee Kiatyongyut	Rajadamnern Stadium	Bangkok, Thailand	TKO	5	
2002-04-26	Loss	(Thailand) Namsaknoi Yudthagarngamtorn	Lumpinee Stadium	Bangkok, Thailand	Decision	5	3:00
For the Lumpinee Stadium Lightweight (135 lbs) title.
2002-03-22	Win	(Thailand) Nontachai Kiatwanlop	Lumpinee Stadium	Bangkok, Thailand	Decision	5	3:00
Defends the Lumpinee Stadium Super Featherweight (130 lbs) title.
2002	Loss	(Thailand) Attachai Fairtex	Lumpinee Stadium	Bangkok, Thailand	Decision	5	3:00
2001-12-07	Win	(Thailand) Nontachai Kiatwanlop	Lumpinee Stadium	Bangkok, Thailand	Decision	5	3:00
2001-05-11	Draw	(Thailand) Khunsuk Sitporamet	Fairtex, Lumpinee Stadium	Bangkok, Thailand	Decision	5	3:00
2001-03-27	Win	(Thailand) Thewaritnoi SKV Gym	Lumpinee Stadium	Bangkok, Thailand	Decision	5	3:00
2001-01-19		(Thailand) Namsaknoi Yudthagarngamtorn	Lumpinee Stadium	Bangkok, Thailand			
2000-12-19	Loss	(Thailand) Namsaknoi Yudthagarngamtorn	Lumpinee Stadium	Bangkok, Thailand	Decision	5	3:00
2000-12-02	Win	(Thailand) Attachai Por.Samranchai	Lumpinee Stadium	Bangkok, Thailand	Decision (Unanimous)	5	3:00
Defends the Lumpinee Stadium Super Featherweight (130 lbs) title.
2000-10-06	Win	(Thailand) Rambojew Don Golf Service	Lumpinee Stadium	Bangkok, Thailand	Decision	5	3:00
2000-09-08	Win	(Thailand) Saenchai Sor.Kingstar	Lumpinee Stadium	Bangkok, Thailand	Decision	5	3:00
2000-08-04	Loss	(Thailand) Saenchai Sor.Kingstar	Lumpinee Stadium	Bangkok, Thailand	Decision	5	3:00
2000-	Win	(Thailand) Namsaknoi Yudthagarngamtorn	Lumpinee Stadium	Bangkok, Thailand	TKO	4	
2000-04-22	Win	(Thailand) Rambojiew Por.Tubtim	Lumpinee Stadium	Bangkok, Thailand	Decision	5	3:00
Wins the Lumpinee Stadium Super Featherweight (130 lbs) title.
2000-02-29	Win	(Thailand) Lamnamoon Sor.Sumalee	Lumpinee Stadium	Bangkok, Thailand	Decision	5	3:00
2000-02-11	Win	(Thailand) Teelek Norsripueng	Lumpinee Stadium	Bangkok, Thailand	TKO (Elbows)	4	
1999-11-11	Loss	(Thailand) Kaolan Kaovichit	Oensongchai, Lumpinee Stadium	Bangkok, Thailand	Decision	5	3:00
1999-06-22	Loss	(Thailand) Khunsuk Sitporamet	Lumpinee Stadium	Thailand	Decision	5	3:00
1999-05-11	Loss	(Thailand) Kaolan Kaovichit	Lumpinee Stadium	Bangkok, Thailand	Decision	5	3:00
1999-03-26	Loss	(Thailand) Kaolan Kaovichit	Lumpinee Stadium	Bangkok, Thailand	Decision	5	3:00
Loses the Lumpinee Stadium Lightweight (135 lbs) title.
1999-02-10	Win	(Thailand) Attachai Por.Yosanan	Daorung Sor.Wanchat, Lumpinee Stadium	Bangkok, Thailand	Decision	5	3:00
1998-12-08	Win	(Thailand) Attachai Por.Yosanan	Onesongchai, Lumpinee Stadium	Bangkok, Thailand	Decision	5	3:00
1998-10-26	Loss	(Thailand) Attachai Por.Yosanan	Kiatsingnoi, Rajadamnern Stadium	Bangkok, Thailand	Decision	5	3:00
1998-09-29	Win	(Thailand) Sangtiennoi Sor.Rungroj	Lumpinee Stadium	Bangkok, Thailand	Decision	5	3:00
Wins the Lumpinee Stadium Lightweight (135 lbs) title.
1998-08-28	Draw	(Thailand) Sangtiennoi Sor.Rungroj	Onesongchai, Lumpinee Stadium	Bangkok, Thailand	Decision	5	3:00
1998-08-07	Win	(Thailand) Rambojew Por.Tubtim	Por Pramuk, Lumpinee Stadium	Bangkok, Thailand	Decision	5	3:00
1998-03-03	Win	(Thailand) Khunsuk Sunwelarewadee	Lumpinee Stadium	Bangkok, Thailand	Decision	5	3:00
1997-12-19	Loss	(Thailand) Lamnamoon Sor.Sumalee	Lumpinee Stadium	Bangkok, Thailand	Decision	5	3:00
For the vacant Lumpinee Stadium Super Featherweight (130 lbs) title.
1997-10-	Win	(Thailand) Rambojew Don Golf Service	Lumpinee Stadium	Bangkok, Thailand	Decision	5	3:00
1997-09-13	Win	(Thailand) Kaolan Kaovichit	Lumpinee Stadium	Bangkok, Thailand	Decision (Unanimous)	5	3:00
1997-06-22	Loss	(Thailand) Khunsuk Sunwelarewadee	Lumpinee Stadium	Bangkok, Thailand	Decision (Unanimous)	5	3:00
1997-	Win	(Thailand) Thongthai Por.Burapa	Lumpinee Stadium	Bangkok, Thailand	Decision	5	3:00
Wins the Thailand Super Featherweight (130 lbs) title.
1997-03-23	Loss	(Thailand) Mathee Jadeepitak	Samrong Stadium	Samut Prakan, Thailand	Decision	5	3:00
for the Samrong Stadium Featherweight (126 lbs) title.
1997-02-15	Loss	(Thailand) Lamnamoon Sor.Sumalee	Lumpinee Stadium	Bangkok, Thailand	Decision	5	3:00
1997-01-05	Win	(Thailand) Bagjo Sor.Phanuch		Chachoengsao, Thailand			
Wins 4.4 million baht side-bet.
1996-11-12	Loss	(Thailand) Namkabuan Nongkeepahuyuth	Lumpinee Stadium	Bangkok, Thailand	Decision	5	3:00
For the Lumpinee Stadium Super Featherweight (130 lbs) title
1996-10-05	Loss	(Thailand) Namkabuan Nongkeepahuyuth	Lumpinee Stadium	Bangkok, Thailand	Decision	5	3:00
1996-08-23	Win	(Thailand) Kaoponglek Luksuratum	Lumpinee Stadium	Bangkok, Thailand	Decision	5	3:00
1996-05-	Win	(Thailand) Prabpramlek Sitnarong	Lumpinee Stadium	Bangkok, Thailand	Decision	5	3:00
1996-03-05	Loss	(Thailand) Therdkiat Sitthepitak	Lumpinee Stadium	Bangkok, Thailand	Decision	5	3:00
1995-11-28	Win	(Thailand) Jompoplek Sor.Sumalee	Lumpinee Stadium	Bangkok, Thailand	Decision	5	3:00
1995-08-22	Loss	(Thailand) Namkabuan Nongkeepahuyuth	Lumpinee Stadium	Bangkok, Thailand	Decision	5	3:00
1995-05-23	Win	(Thailand) Choengnoen Sitphutthapim	Lumpinee Stadium	Bangkok, Thailand	Decision	5	3:00
Wins the Lumpinee Stadium Super Bantamweight (122 lbs) title.
1995-05-05	Win	(Thailand) Ritthichai Lookchaomaesaitong	Lumpinee Stadium	Bangkok, Thailand	Decision	5	3:00
1995-04-04	Loss	(Thailand) Lamnamoon Sor.Sumalee	Lumpinee Stadium	Bangkok, Thailand	Decision	5	3:00
1995-03-03	Win	(Thailand) Chatchai Paiseetong	Lumpinee Stadium	Bangkok, Thailand	Decision	5	3:00
1995-01-17	Win	(Thailand) Mathee Jadeepitak	Fairtex, Lumpinee Stadium	Bangkok, Thailand	Decision	5	3:00
1994-12-09	Loss	(Thailand) Silapathai Jockygym	Lumpinee Stadium	Bangkok, Thailand	Decision	5	3:00
1994-11-15	Win	(Thailand) Mathee Jadeepitak	Lumpinee Stadium	Bangkok, Thailand	Decision	5	3:00
Wins 1.9 million baht side-bet.
1994-10-24	Win	(Thailand) Karuhat Sor.Supawan	Rajadamnern Stadium	Bangkok, Thailand	Decision	5	3:00
1994-08-26	Win	(Thailand) Wangchannoi Sor Palangchai	Lumpinee Stadium	Bangkok, Thailand	Decision	5	3:00
1994-	Win	(Thailand) Ritthichai Lookchaomaesaitong	Lumpinee Stadium	Bangkok, Thailand	Decision	5	3:00
1994-07-19	Loss	(Thailand) Lamnamoon Sor.Sumalee	Lumpinee Stadium	Bangkok, Thailand	Decision	5	3:00
1994-06-10	Win	(Thailand) Boontawarn Sithuakaew	Lumpinee Stadium	Bangkok, Thailand	Decision	5	3:00
1994-05-27	Loss	(Thailand) Saengmorakot Sor.Ploenchit	Lumpinee Stadium	Bangkok, Thailand	Decision	5	3:00
1994-03-04	Loss	(Thailand) Nungubon Sitlerchai	Lumpinee Stadium	Bangkok, Thailand	TKO (Punches)	3	
1994-01-28	Win	(Thailand) Nungubon Sitlerchai	Lumpinee Stadium	Bangkok, Thailand	Decision	5	3:00
1993-12-24	Win	(Thailand) Jaroensap Kiatbanchong	Lumpinee Stadium	Bangkok, Thailand	Decision	5	3:00
1993-12-03	Win	(Thailand) Ritthidej Keadpayak	Lumpinee Stadium	Bangkok, Thailand	Decision	5	3:00
1993-10-02	Win	(Thailand) Chingchai Sakdiroon	Lumpinee Stadium	Bangkok, Thailand	Decision	5	3:00
1993-07-13	Win	(Thailand) Prabpramlek Sitnarong	Lumpinee Stadium	Bangkok, Thailand	Decision	5	3:00
1993-05-07	Win	(Thailand) Thewaritnoi Sor.Rakchat	Lumpinee Stadium	Bangkok, Thailand	Decision	5	3:00
1993-02-09	Loss	(Thailand) Kompayak Singmanee	Lumpinee Stadium	Bangkok, Thailand	Decision	5	3:00
1992-11-20	Loss	(Thailand) Kompayak Singmanee	Lumpinee Stadium	Bangkok, Thailand	Decision	5	3:00
1992-09-25	Loss	(Thailand) Nongnarong Luksamrong	Lumpinee Stadium	Bangkok, Thailand	Decision	5	3:00
For the vacant Lumpinee Stadium Light Flyweight (108 lbs) title.
1992	Loss	(Thailand) Pichitnoi Sithbangrajan	Lumpinee Stadium	Bangkok, Thailand	KO (Punches)	3	
Legend: Win Loss Draw/No contest Notes
