= Jean-Charles Skarbowsky =

French former professional Muay Thai fighter

- Born: Jean-Charles Skarbowsky; March 10, 1975 (age 51); Paris, France
- Other names: The Tattooed Dragon, JCS, Jeannot, The Drunken Master; Chong Starbowsky; Skarbowsky Kor.Bangkruai
- Height: 173 cm (5 ft 8 in)
- Division: Super Lightweight; Welterweight
- Style: Muay Thai
- Stance: Orthodox
- Team: Club Dauemesnil; Jocky Gym
- Trainer: André Zeitoun
- Years active: 1992–2006

Kickboxing record
- Total: 101
- Wins: 75
- By knockout: 51
- Losses: 23
- Draws: 3

Jean-Charles Skarbowsky (born March 10, 1975) is a French former professional Muay Thai fighter. He was a former ISKA champion at 65 kg and three-time European Muay Thai champion. Skarbowsky has been called one of the best farangs who have fought in Thailand. He is classified as one of the European legends of Muay Thai from the 1990s. He was the first non-Thai boxer to become ranked Number 1 at Rajadamnern stadium in 2003. He has trained full-time at the Jocky Gym alongside stars such as Saenchai and Kaoklai.

== Biography and career ==
His mother emigrated at age 25 from Romania to France.

After a flying start to his career, both in France and Thailand, where he accumulated a number of quick victories, he broke his right hand in 1997 while defending his title again in Europe. After two years of forced shutdown, he resumed his career in 1999 and made a stunning return to the highest level, overcoming the pessimistic prognosis of the doctors.

In 2000 Jean fought Robert Kaennorasing for the ISKA 65 kg title and won by knockout.

Jean fought and defeated Sak Kaoponlek by knockout and became the first non-Thai boxer to become ranked number 1 at Rajadamnern stadium in 2003, would become number one ranked again in 2006.

In 2010, Skarbowsky appeared on the twelfth season of the American mixed martial arts reality television show The Ultimate Fighter, where he was the Muay Thai coach on Georges St-Pierre's team.

== Titles and achievements ==
=== Titles ===
- 2002 Winner Superbout Kings Cup
- 2000 I.S.K.A. Muay Thai World champion (65 kg)
- 1999 Winner Kings Cup
- 1995–1996 3-time European Muay Thai champion
- 1995 French Muay Thai champion
- 2000 Sports Writers Association of Thailand Fight of the Year (vs Robert Kaennorasing)

=== Ranking ===
- 2006 No. 1 Rajadamnern Stadium
- 2005 No. 4 Rajadamnern Stadium
- 2003 No. 1 Rajadamnern Stadium

== Muay Thai record ==
Professional Muay Thai and Kickboxing record
75 Wins (51 (T)KO's), 23 Losses, 3 Draws
Date	Result	Opponent	Event	Location	Method	Round	Time
2006-06-29	Loss	(Thailand) Big Ben Chor Praram 6	Jarumueang Fights, Rajadamnern Stadium	Bangkok, Thailand	TKO (Ref stop/elbow strike)	1	2:45
2006-05-20	Loss	(Philippines) Ole Laursen	K-1 Scandinavia Grand Prix 2006	Stockholm, Sweden	Decision (Unanimous)	4	3:00
2006-04-08	Draw	(France) Farid Khider	La Nuit des Superfights IV	Paris, France	Decision Draw	5	3:00
2006-03-00	Win	(Thailand) Chalunlap	France vs Thailand	Levallois, France	Decision	5	3:00
2006-01-05	Win	(Thailand) Lamsongkram Chuwattana	WMC Superfights, Rajadamnern Stadium	Bangkok, Thailand	KO (Punches)	1	
Became N°1 Rajadamnern Stadium.
2005-12-05	Loss	(Thailand) Wanlop Sitpholek	S1 World Tournament 2005, Semi Final	Bangkok, Thailand	Decision	3	3:00
2005-12-05	Win	(Portugal) Paolo Balicha	S1 World Tournament 2005, Quarter Final	Bangkok, Thailand	Decision	3	3:00
2005-11-22	Win	(Thailand) Nonthanun Por Pramuk	P.Pramuk Fights, Lumpinee Stadium	Bangkok, Thailand	KO	1	
2005-09-15	Loss	(Thailand) Munkong Kiatsomkuan	S.Wanchard Fights, Rajadamnern Stadium	Bangkok, Thailand	Decision	5	3:00
2005-09-09	Loss	(Thailand) Buakaw Por. Pramuk	Xplosion 2005	Hong Kong	Decision (Unanimous)	5	3:00
For the S-1 World title.
2005-00-00	Loss	(Thailand) Munkong Kiatsomkuan		Samut Sakhon Province, Thailand	Decision	5	3:00
2005-06-04	Win	(Thailand) Khunsuk Phetsupaphan	Omnoi Stadium	Bangkok, Thailand	TKO (Ref stop)	4	
2005-05-07	Loss	(France) Farid Khider	Gala in Palais des Sports	Thiais, France	TKO (Ref stop)	1	
2005-04-14	Loss	(New Zealand) Jordan Tai	Phillip Lam Muay Thai Promotion	Auckland, New Zealand	TKO (Ref stop)	1	
2005-03-25	Win	(Thailand) Khunsuk Phetsupaphan	Petchsupaparn, Lumpinee Stadium	Bangkok, Thailand	Decision	5	3:00
2005-02-18	Win	(Thailand) Khunsuk Phetsupaphan	Petchsupaparn, Lumpinee Stadium	Bangkok, Thailand	Decision	5	3:00
2004-12-05	Loss	(Thailand) Khunsuk Phetsupaphan	Kings Birthday: S1 -70 kg Tournament	Thailand	Decision	3	3:00
2004-10-23	Win	(Netherlands) Chris van Venrooij	SuperLeague Germany 2004	Oberhausen, Germany	KO (Flying Knee)	4	
2004-09-24	Loss	(New Zealand) Shane Chapman	New Zealand vs France	Auckland, NZ	Decision	5	3:00
2004-07-24	Win	(Japan) Masaaki Kato	All Japan Kickboxing Federation	Tokyo, Japan	KO (Front kick)	2	1:55
2004-06-05	Loss	(France) Samir Mohamed	Le Grand Tournoi at Zénith	Paris, France	Decision	7	2:00
2004-04-07	Win	(Thailand) Fuji Chalmsak	K-1 World MAX '04 Open	Tokyo, Japan	2 Ext.R Decision (Unanimous)	5	3:00
2004-03-04	Loss	(Australia) John Wayne Parr	S1 World Championships '04, Semi Final	Bangkok, Thailand	TKO (Ref stop)	3	0:40
2004-03-04	Win	(Thailand) Suriya Sor Ploenchit	S1 World Championships '04, Quarter Final	Bangkok, Thailand	Decision		
2003-10-07	Win	(Thailand) Khunsuk Phetsupaphan	Petchsupaparn, Lumpinee Stadium	Bangkok, Thailand	TKO (Doc stop)	4	
2003-08-03	Loss	(Thailand) Sagatpetch Sor.Sakulpan	Rajadamnern Stadium	Bangkok, Thailand	TKO (Punches)	1	
2003-06-19	Win	(Thailand) Chokdee Por.Pramuk	Rajadamnern Stadium	Bangkok, Thailand	KO	2	
2003-04-18	Win	(Thailand) Sak Kaoponlek	Grand tournoi des Moyens	Paris, France	KO		
2003-03-03	Win	(Thailand) Sak Kaoponlek	Rajadamnern Stadium	Bangkok, Thailand	KO (Right uppercut)	3	
Became N°1 Rajadamnern Stadium.
2003-01-00	Win	(Thailand) Munkong Kiatsomkuan	Rajadamnern Stadium	Bangkok, Thailand	KO	1	
2002-12-05	Win	(Thailand) Rambojiew Por.Tabtim	King's Birthday	Thailand	KO (Doc stop/elbow strike)	3	
2002-07-07	Loss	(Thailand) Sak Kaoponlek	ISKA Kickboxing, Palais Omnisport Bercy	Paris, France	KO (Right high kick)	4	
2002-04-13	Win	(Thailand) Orono Por.MuangUbon	Songkran : New year Celebration	Nakhon Ratchasima, Thailand	Decision	5	3:00
2002-03-04	Draw	(Thailand) Orono Por.MuangUbon	Rajadamnern Stadium	Bangkok, Thailand	Decision draw	5	3:00
2002-01-00	Win	(Thailand) Orono Por Muang Ubon		Udon Thani, Thailand	TKO (Ref stop)	3	
2001-11-22	Loss	(Thailand) Sak Kaoponlek		Trieste, Italy	KO (Elbow)	4	
For the Trieste Muaythai World title (63.5 kg).
2001-05-17	Loss	(Japan) Satoshi Kobayashi	AJKF JUST BRING IT!	Tokyo, Japan	TKO (Punches)	2	1:31
2000-12-05	Loss	(Thailand) Robert Kaennorasing	Kings Birthday	Bangkok, Thailand	Decision	5	3:00
2000-06-08	Win	(Thailand) Robert Kaennorasing	Muay Thai in Las Vegas, The Venetian	Las Vegas, NV	KO (Left uppercut)	1	2:23
Wins the I.S.K.A. Muaythai World title (65 kg).
2000-05-20	Win	(Thailand) Chalunlap	Muaythai in Grand Dôme	Villebon, France	Decision	5	3:00
1999-12-05	Win	(Thailand) Duanisan Kiatsarika	Kings Birthday	Sanam Luang, Thailand	TKO (Punches and knee to the head)	5	
Debut fight in Bangkok against Lumpinee ranked #4.
1999-10-00	Win	(Thailand) Banca Pudying	France vs Thailand	Saint-Ouen, France	KO	3	
1999-07-	Win	(Thailand) Konvichan		Koh Samui, Thailand	KO	1	1:30
1999-	Win	(Scotland) Alex Sneddon		Saint-Ouen, France	KO	1	
1999-04-03	Win	(France) Samir Gharbi		France	KO	2	
1997-	Win	(Thailand) Poniyom		Thailand	KO		
1997-08-	Win	(Thailand) Apichaï		Thailand	KO (Uppercut & Highkick)	1	
1997-07-28	Win	(Thailand) Lekpech	Chaweng Stadium	Koh Samui, Thailand	KO	4	
1996-03-09	Win	(France) Benoit Atayi	European Muaythai Championship	Avignon, France	Decision	5	3:00
Defends the European Muaythai title.
1996-01-19	Win	(France) Kader Marouf	European Muaythai Championship	Levallois, France	TKO (Gave up)	4	
Defends the European Muaythai title.
1995-11-17	Win		Muaythai Gala in Palais des Sports	Levallois, France	KO	2	
1995-	Win	(France) Ange N’Kemi			KO	2	
1995-	Win	(Netherlands) Fykri Tijarti			KO	2	
1995-	Win	(Netherlands) Jeff De Ling			KO	2	
1995-05-27	Win	(Belgium) Yigin Osman	European Muaythai Championship		Decision	5	3:00
Wins the European Muaythai title.
1995-	Win	(France) Khalil	French Championship	Nanterre, France	KO	3	
Wins the French Muaythai title (63.5 kg).
1995-01-	Win	(France) Jean-Luc Janvier		Paris, France	KO (Uppercut)		
1994-12-01	Win	(France) Mohamed Yamani	Gala in Gymnase Japy	Paris, France	KO	3	
1994-	Draw			Thailand	Decision		
1994-	Loss	(France) Mustapha Mekboul		France	KO		
1994-00-00	Loss	(France) Jean-Luc Janvier	French Championships, Quarter Final	France	Decision	5	
1992-02-	Win	(France) Karim Benattia		Saint-Maur, France	Decision		
Legend: Win Loss Draw/No contest Notes

== Kun Khmer record ==
Professional Muay Thai and Kickboxing record
Date	Result	Opponent	Event	Location	Method	Round	Time
2001-06-	Loss	(Cambodia) Eh Phoutong	Phnom Penh Stadium	Phnom Penh, Cambodia	TKO	5	
2001-04-	Loss	(Cambodia) Eh Phoutong	Phnom Penh Stadium	Phnom Penh, Cambodia	TKO	3	
2001-03-26	Loss	(Cambodia) Eh Phoutong	Phnom Penh Stadium	Phnom Penh, Cambodia	TKO	1	0:15
Legend: Win Loss Draw/No contest Notes

== See also ==
- List of male kickboxers
