= Kaolan Kaovichit =

Thai former professional Muay Thai fighter and kickboxer

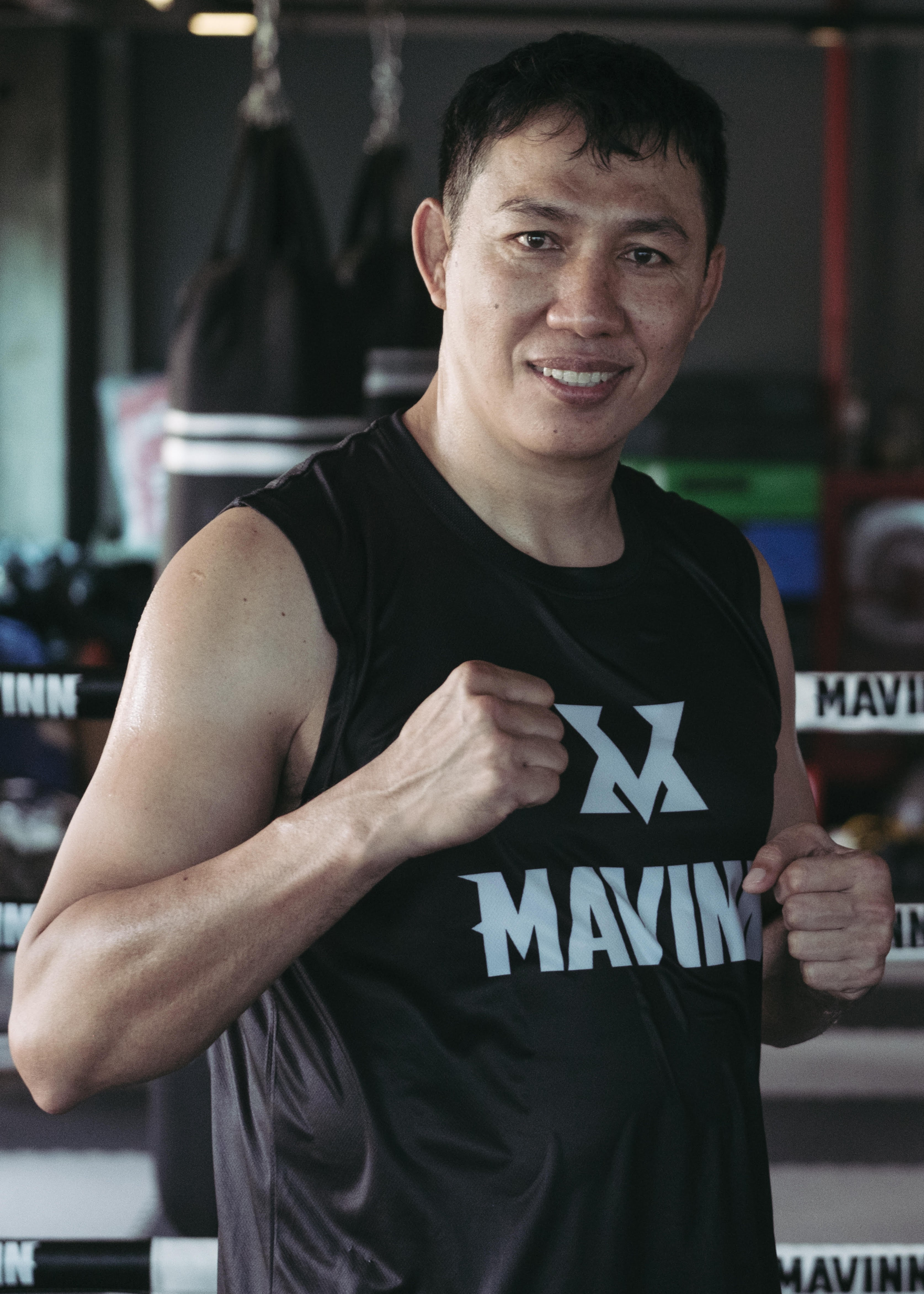
- Kaolan in 2026
- Born: Jehmod Niyomdecha; May 12, 1978 (age 48); Mueang Songkhla, Thailand
- Native name: เจ๊ะไหมด นิยมเดชา
- Nickname: Lord Ghost-Boned Knee (ขุนเข่ากระดูกผี)
- Height: 177 cm (5 ft 10 in)
- Division: Light Flyweight; Super Flyweight; Super Bantamweight; Lightweight; Welterweight
- Style: Muay Thai (Muay Khao)
- Stance: Orthodox
- Team: Kaovichit Gym; Kiatbanchong Gym
- Years active: c. 1989–2006

Other information
- Occupation: Muay Thai trainer

Jehmod Niyomdecha (Thai: เจ๊ะไหมด นิยมเดชา; born May 12, 1978), known professionally as Kaolan Kaovichit (Thai: เก้าล้าน เก้าวิชิต), is a Thai former professional Muay Thai fighter and kickboxer. He is a former three-division Lumpinee Stadium champion, the 1998 Sports Writers Association of Thailand Fighter of the Year, and the runner-up of the inaugural K-1 World MAX 2002 World Tournament Final who was famous during the 1990s and 2000s.

== Biography ==
Kaolan Kaovichit was born in Songkhla Province, Thailand on May 12, 1978, as Jahormat Miyundichar. He trained at the Kiatbanchong gym.

== Titles and accomplishments ==
- Lumpinee Stadium
  - 1996 Lumpinee Stadium Super Flyweight (115 lbs) Champion
  - 1999 Lumpinee Stadium Lightweight (135 lbs) Champion
  - 2003 Lumpinee Stadium Welterweight (147 lbs) Champion
- World Muay Thai Council
  - 2001 WMC World Welterweight (147 lbs) Champion
- K-1
  - 2002 K-1 World MAX Final Runner-up

Awards

- 2001 Sports Writers Association of Thailand Fight of the Year (vs Namsaknoi Yudthagarngamtorn)
- 1998 Sports Writers Association of Thailand Fighter of the Year

== Fight record ==
Professional kickboxing record
Date	Result	Opponent	Event	Location	Method	Round	Time
2006-07-02	Loss	(Japan) Tatsuya Ishiguro	N.J.K.F. "Advance VI -Muay Thai Open-	Tokyo, Japan	KO (Punches)	1	2:33
2004-04-17	Loss	(Japan) Masaaki Kato	Muaythailumpineekrikkri Fights, Lumpinee Stadium	Bangkok, Thailand	KO (Knees)	2	
For the vacant W.P.M.F. Welterweight (147 lbs) World title.
2003-08-17	Loss	(Japan) Yoshihiro Sato	A.J.K.F. "All Japan Kickboxing 2003 Hurricane Blow"	Tokyo, Japan	Decision (Unanimous)	5	3:00
For the W.K.A. Muay Thai Welterweight (147 lbs) World title.
2003-07-20	Draw	(Japan) Takahiko Shimizu	AJKF "All Japan Kickboxing 2003 Kick Out"	Bunkyo, Tokyo, Japan	Decision (1-0)	5	3:00
2003-03-08	Win	(Thailand) Pajonsuk Lukprabat	Lumpinee Stadium	Bangkok, Thailand	Decision (Unanimous)	5	3:00
Wins the Lumpinee Stadium Welterweight (147 lbs) title.
2002-07-20	Loss	(Thailand) Pajonsuk Lukprabat	Lumpinee Stadium	Bangkok, Thailand	Decision (Unanimous)	5	3:00
For the vacant Lumpinee Stadium Welterweight (147 lbs) title.
2002-05-11	Loss	(Netherlands) Albert Kraus	K-1 World MAX '02 Final, Final	Tokyo, Japan	KO (Left Hook)	1	1:00
For the K-1 MAX World Tournament title -70 kg.
2002-05-11	Win	(Japan) Takayuki Kohiruimaki	K-1 World MAX '02 Final, Semi Finals	Tokyo, Japan	KO (Knees)	2	2:42
2002-05-11	Win	(China) Zhang Jiapo	K-1 World MAX '02 Final, Quarter Finals	Tokyo, Japan	Decision (Unanimous)	3	3:00
2002-02-27	Win	(Sudan) Faisal Zakaria		Rangsit, Thailand	Decision	5	3:00
2001-12-04	Loss	(Thailand) Namsaknoi Yudthagarngamtorn	Lumpinee Stadium	Bangkok, Thailand	Decision	5	3:00
2001-08-02	Win	(Thailand) Pajonsuk Lukprabat	Lumpinee Stadium	Bangkok, Thailand	Decision	5	3:00
2001-06-24	Win	(Thailand) Pajonsuk Lukprabat	Muay Thai - The World Heritage	Bangkok, Thailand	Decision (Unanimous)	5	3:00
Wins the vacant W.M.T.C. Welterweight (147 lbs) World title.
2001-04-21	Loss	(France) Morad Sari	Les Gladiateurs du Millenium	Paris France	Decision	3	3:00
2000-12-05	Win	(France) Dany Bill	King's Birthday	Bangkok, Thailand	Decision (Unanimous)	5	3:00
2000-08-04	Win	(Thailand) Depitak Sityodtong	Lumpinee Stadium	Bangkok, Thailand	Decision (Unanimous)	5	3:00
2000-07-08	Win	(France) Kamel Mayouf	ISKA Kickboxing	Las Vegas, Nevada, USA	Decision (Unanimous)	5	3:00
2000	Win	(Thailand) Khunsuk Phetsupaphan		Phetchaburi Province, Thailand	Decision (Unanimous)	5	3:00
2000	Win	(Thailand) Orono Por.MuangUbon	Lumpinee Stadium	Bangkok, Thailand	Decision	5	3:00
2000-04-25	Loss	(Thailand) Namsaknoi Yudthagarngamtorn	Lumpinee Stadium	Bangkok, Thailand	Decision (Unanimous)	5	3:00
For the Lumpinee Stadium Lightweight (135 lbs) title.
1999-11-11	Win	(Thailand) Samkor Chor.Rathchatasupak	Onesongchai, Lumpinee Stadium	Bangkok, Thailand	Decision	5	3:00
1999-09-21	Loss	(Thailand) Khunsuk Phetsupaphan		Petchaburi, Thailand	Decision	5	3:00
1999-08-10	Loss	(Thailand) Khunsuk Phetsupaphan	Lumpinee Stadium	Bangkok, Thailand	KO	4	
Loses the Lumpinee Stadium Lightweight (135 lbs) title.
1999-05-11	Win	(Thailand) Samkor Chor.Rathchatasupak	Lumpinee Stadium	Bangkok, Thailand	Decision	5	3:00
1999-03-26	Win	(Thailand) Samkor Chor.Rathchatasupak	Lumpinee Stadium	Bangkok, Thailand	Decision	5	3:00
Wins the Lumpinee Stadium Lightweight (135 lbs) title.
1999-02-10	Win	(Thailand) Therdkiat Kiatrungroj	Lumpinee Stadium	Bangkok, Thailand	Decision	5	3:00
1998-12-08	Win	(Thailand) Namkabuan Nongkeepahuyuth	Lumpinee Stadium	Bangkok, Thailand	Decision	5	3:00
1998-10-30	Win	(Thailand) Lamnamoon Sor.Sumalee	Lumpinee Stadium	Bangkok, Thailand	Decision	5	3:00
1998-09-11	Win	(Thailand) Rambojiew Por.Thubtim	Lumpinee Stadium	Bangkok, Thailand	Decision	5	3:00
1998-05-26	Loss	(Thailand) Rambojiew Por.Thubtim	Lumpinee Stadium	Bangkok, Thailand	Decision	5	3:00
1998-03-03	Draw	(Thailand) Bakjo Sor.Pannut	Lumpinee Stadium	Bangkok, Thailand	Decision	5	3:00
1997-09-13	Loss	(Thailand) Samkor Chor.Rathchatasupak	Lumpinee Stadium	Bangkok, Thailand	Decision	5	3:00
1997-05-23	Loss	(Thailand) Ritthichai Lukjaopordam	Onesongchai, Lumpinee Stadium	Bangkok, Thailand	KO (Punches)	4	
For the Lumpinee Stadium Super Bantamweight (122 lbs) title.
1997-03-28	Win	(Thailand) Daoudon Sor.Suchart	Lumpinee Stadium	Bangkok, Thailand	Decision	5	3:00
1997-02-25	Win	(Thailand) Sod Looknongyangtoy	Lumpinee Stadium	Bangkok, Thailand	Decision	5	3:00
1996-11-29	Loss	(Thailand) Nungubon Sitlerchai	Lumpinee Stadium	Bangkok, Thailand	KO (Punches)	2	
1996-10-22	Win	(Thailand) Sod Looknongyangtoy	Onesongchai, Lumpinee Stadium	Bangkok, Thailand	Decision	5	3:00
1996-09-24	Win	(Thailand) Thongchai Tor.Silachai	Onesongchai, Lumpinee Stadium	Bangkok, Thailand	Decision	5	3:00
Wins the vacant Lumpinee Stadium Super Flyweight (115 lbs) title.
1996-	Loss	(Thailand) Mathee Jadeepitak	Lumpinee Stadium	Bangkok, Thailand	Decision	5	3:00
1996-03-26	Win	(Thailand) Nuengpichit Sityodtong	Lumpinee Stadium	Bangkok, Thailand	Decision	5	3:00
1996-02-24	Win	(Thailand) Samliam Singmanee	Lumpinee Stadium	Bangkok, Thailand	Decision	5	3:00
1995-10-15	Loss	(Thailand) Saenkeng Sor.Weerakul	Lumpinee Stadium	Bangkok, Thailand	Decision	5	3:00
For the Lumpinee Stadium Light Flyweight (108 lbs) title.
1995-09-23	Win	(Thailand) Thetthailek Sarina	Lumpinee Stadium	Bangkok, Thailand	Decision	5	3:00
1995-08-04	Win	(Thailand) Ekachai Or.Chaibadan	Lumpinee Stadium	Bangkok, Thailand	Decision	5	3:00
1995-04-25	Win	(Thailand) Rattanasak Kratindaeng	Thahansuea, Lumpinee Stadium	Bangkok, Thailand	Decision	5	3:00
1995-	Loss	(Thailand) Hippy Singmanee	Lumpinee Stadium	Bangkok, Thailand	KO	2	
Legend: Win Loss Draw/No contest Notes
