= Koji Yoshimoto =

Japanese kickboxer

- Born: 吉本光志; February 6, 1980 (age 46); Tokyo, Japan
- Nationality: Japanese
- Height: 171 cm (5 ft 7 in)
- Weight: 63 kg (139 lb; 9.9 st)
- Style: Kickboxing
- Stance: Orthodox
- Fighting out of: Tokyo, Japan
- Team: Neungsiam Gym; AJ Gym (former)

Kickboxing record
- Total: 50
- Wins: 30
- By knockout: 4
- Losses: 17
- Draws: 3

Mixed martial arts record
- Total: 8
- Wins: 5
- By knockout: 1
- By decision: 3
- By disqualification: 1
- Losses: 1
- By disqualification: 1
- Draws: 2

Koji Yoshimoto (Japanese: 吉本光志, Yoshimoto Koji; born February 6, 1980) is a Japanese retired kickboxer and mixed martial artist. A professional competitor between 2000 and 2016, Yoshimoto held the RISE super lightweight title and was the 2007 Pancrase Neo Blood Featherweight Tournament winner.

== Kickboxing career ==
=== RISE ===
==== Super lightweight champion ====
Yoshimoto was scheduled to fight Yūsuke Sugawara for the inaugural RISE super lightweight title at RISE 60 on November 22, 2009. He won the fight by unanimous decision, after two extra rounds were contested.

After capturing the inaugural title, Yoshimoto faced Naoki in a non-title bout at RISE 63 on April 7, 2010. He lost the fight by split decision, after an extra round was fought. Yoshimoto next faced TURBΦ in another non-title bout at RISE 68 on July 31, 2010. He won the fight by a late second-round knockout, flooring his opponent with a right cross. Yoshimoto faced Yuto Watanabe in his third consecutive non-title bout at RISE 71 on October 3, 2010. He won the fight by majority decision.

Yoshimoto moved down in weight for his next bout, in order to face Yuki for the inaugural RISE lightweight title at RISE 73R on December 19, 2010. He was stopped with low kicks at the 2:09 minute mark of the second round.

Yoshimito faced Yūsuke Sugawara for the second time in his career in his first RISE super lightweight title defense at RISE 74 on February 27, 2011. The fight was ruled a unanimous decision draw.

After making his first title defense, Yoshimoto faced Shohei Asahara at K-1 WORLD MAX 2011 –63 kg Japan Tournament FINAL on June 25, 2011. He won the fight by unanimous decision, after an extra round was fought. Yoshimoto next faced Hiroshi Mizumachi in a non-title bout at RISE 83 on September 23, 2011. He won the fight by unanimous decision. Yoshimoto faced Lee Sung-hyun in another non-title bout at RISE 85 on November 23, 2011. He once again won by unanimous decision.

Yoshimoto faced Yasuomi Soda in his second RISE title defense at RISE 86 on January 28, 2012. He won the fight by unanimous decision. Yoshimoto next beat Raz Sarkisjan by unanimous decision in a non-title bout at RISE/M-1MC ～INFINITY～ on December 2, 2012, before being booked to rematch Yasuomi Soda in his third RISE title defense at RISE 92 on March 17, 2013. He lost the fight by unanimous decision.

==== Later RISE career ====
Yoshimoto faced Xie Lei at K-1 WORLD MAX 2013 Final on October 11, 2014. He lost the fight by unanimous decision. Yoshimoto rebounded from this loss with a decision win against Hanji at K-1 CHINA vs JAPAN on February 1, 2015. Yoshimoto extended his winning streak to two fights with a third-round knockout of Daniel Zahra at RISE 105 on May 31, 2015. This winning streak was snapped by Hiroki Shishido at SHOOT BOXING 30th ANNIVERSARY "CAESAR TIME!" on August 22, 2015, who beat him by a fifth-round technical knockout. Yoshimoto faced Zakaria Zouggary in his retirement fight at RISE 109 on January 31, 2016. He won the fight by a third-round technical knockout.

== Titles and accomplishments ==
=== Kickboxing ===
- 2005 IKMF Asia Lightweight Championship
- RISE
  - 2009 RISE Super Lightweight Championship

Awards

- eFight.jp
  - Fighter of the Month (January 2016)

=== Mixed martial arts ===
- 2007 Pancrase Neo Blood Featherweight Tournament Winner

== Mixed martial arts record ==
Professional record breakdown
8 matches	5 wins	1 loss
By knockout	1	0
By submission	0	0
By decision	3	0
By disqualification	1	1
Draws	2	
No contests	0	

Res.	Record	Opponent	Method	Event	Date	Round	Time	Location	Notes
Win	5–1–2	Fanjin Son	Decision (Majority)	Cage Force EX Eastern Bound	November 11, 2007	3	5:00	Tokyo, Japan	
Draw	4–1–2	Mitsuhisa Sunabe	Draw (Majority)	Pancrase: Rising 6	September 5, 2007	3	5:00	Tokyo, Japan	
Win	4-1-1	Yuichi Miyagi	Forfeit	PANCRASE 2007 RISING TOUR	July 27, 2007			Tokyo, Japan	Wins Neo Blood Featherweight Tournament
Win	3-1-1	Takashi Hasegawa	KO (Left Cross)	PANCRASE 2007 RISING TOUR	May 30, 2007	2	3:06	Tokyo, Japan	Neo Blood Featherweight Tournament Semi Final
Loss	2-1-1	Takashi Hasegawa	Disqualification (Low Blow)	PANCRASE 2007 RISING TOUR	May 5, 2007	2	3:20	Tokyo, Japan	Neo Blood Featherweight Tournament Semi Final
Win	2-0-1	Yasutomo Tanaka	Decision (Unanimous)	PANCRASE 2007 RISING TOUR	March 25, 2007	2	5:00	Tokyo, Japan	Neo Blood Featherweight Tournament Quarter Final
Win	1-0-1	Yuki Yamasawa	Decision (Majority)	PANCRASE 2006 Special Night	December 12, 2006	2	5:00	Tokyo, Japan	
Draw	0-0-1	Yuichiro Shirai	Decision	PANCRASE 2006 BLOW TOUR	July 28, 2006	2	5:00	Tokyo, Japan	

== Kickboxing record ==
Professional Kickboxing Record
30 Wins (4 (T)KO's), 17 Losses, 3 Draws, 0 No Contest
Date	Result	Opponent	Event	Location	Method	Round	Time
2016-01-31	Win	(Netherlands) Zakaria Zouggary	RISE 109	Tokyo, Japan	TKO (Knee to the body)	3	1:58
2015-08-22	Loss	(Japan) Hiroki Shishido	SHOOT BOXING 30th ANNIVERSARY“CAESAR TIME!”	Tokyo, Japan	Ext.R TKO	5	1:41
2015-05-31	Win	(Malta) Daniel Zahra	RISE 105	Tokyo, Japan	KO (Right Knee)	3	2:15
2015-02-01	Win	(China) Hanji	K-1 CHINA vs JAPAN	China	Decision	3	3:00
2014-10-11	Loss	(China) Xie Lei	K-1 WORLD MAX 2013 Final	Pattaya, Thailand	Decision (Unanimous)	3	3:00
2014-06-07	Loss	(Malta) Daniel Zahra	WKN GLADIATOR 8	Malta	Decision	3	3:00
For the WKN International Title.
2014-03-30	Win	(Korea) Ryu Hyun Woo	RISE 98	Tokyo, Japan	Decision (Majority)	3	3:00
2013-03-17	Loss	(Japan) Yasuomi Soda	RISE 92	Tokyo, Japan	Decision (Unanimous)	5	3:00
Loses RISE -65kg Title.
2012-12-02	Win	(Armenia) Raz Sarkisjan	RISE/M-1MC ～INFINITY～	Tokyo, Japan	Decision (Unanimous)	3	3:00
2012-01-28	Win	(Japan) Yasuomi Soda	RISE 86	Japan	Decision (Unanimous)	5	3:00
Defends RISE -65kg Title.
2011-11-23	Win	(Korea) Lee Sung-hyun	RISE 85	Japan	Decision (Unanimous)	3	3:00
2011-09-23	Win	(Japan) Hiroshi Mizumachi	RISE 83	Japan	Decision (Unanimous)	3	3:00
2011-06-25	Win	(Japan) Shohei Asahara	K-1 World MAX 2011 –63 kg Japan Tournament Final	Japan	Ext.R Decision (Unanimous)	4	3:00
2011-02-27	Draw	(Japan) Yūsuke Sugawara	RISE 74	Tokyo, Japan	Decision (Unanimous)	5	3:00
Defends RISE -65kg Title.
2010-12-19	Loss	(Japan) Yuki	RISE 73R	Japan	TKO (Low Kicks)	2	2:09
For the inaugural RISE -63kg Title.
2010-10-03	Win	(Japan) Yuto Watanabe	RISE 71	Tokyo, Japan	Decision (Majority)	3	3:00
2010-07-31	Win	(Japan) TURBΦ	RISE 68	Tokyo, Japan	KO (Right Cross)	2	2:54
2010-04-07	Loss	(Japan) Naoki	RISE 63	Tokyo, Japan	Ext.R Decision (Split)	4	3:00
2009-11-22	Win	(Japan) Yūsuke Sugawara	RISE 60	Tokyo, Japan	2nd Ext.R Decision (Unanimous)	6	3:00
Wins the inaugural RISE -65kg Title.
2009-10-14	Win	(Japan) Shoji	RISE 59	Tokyo, Japan	Decision (Unanimous)	3	3:00
2009-08-14	Win	(Japan) Shunsuke Ōishi	Krush Lightweight Grand Prix 2009 ～Round.2～	Tokyo, Japan	Ext.R Decision (Uannimous)	4	3:00
2009-06-14	Loss	(Japan) Yuki Yamamoto	MA Japan Kick BREAK THROUGH-11	Tokyo, Japan	TKO	4	0:23
2008-12-23	Loss	(Japan) Akihiro Kuroda	KING OF KINGS TOUITSU, Semi Final	Kobe, Japan	Ext.R Decision (Split)	4	3:00
2008-12-23	Win	(Japan) Rashata	KING OF KINGS TOUITSU, Quarter Final	Kobe, Japan	Ext.R Decision (Uannimous)	4	3:00
2008-09-19	Win	(Thailand) Kanongsuk Weerasakreck	AJKF SWORD FIGHT 2008	Tokyo, Japan	Decision (Uannimous)	5	3:00
2008-05-31	Win	(Japan) Ryuji Kajiwara	AJKF vs Team Dragon	Tokyo, Japan	Decision (Majority)	3	3:00
2008-03-20	Win	(Japan) Yoichiro Miakami	AJKF Kick On !	Tokyo, Japan	Decision (Majority)	3	3:00
2006-10-07	Win	(Japan) Tomohiro Shimano	AJKF CUB☆KICK’S 3days 1st AJ NIGHT ～Tradition～	Tokyo, Japan	Decision (Majority)	3	3:00
2006-01-04	Loss	(Japan) Satoruvashicoba	AJKF NEW YEAR KICK FESTIVAL 2006	Tokyo, Japan	KO (Left Hook)	2	2:30
For the AJKF Ligfhtweight Title.
2005-11-12	Win	(Japan) Hiromasa Masuda	AJKF Fight Must Go On	Tokyo, Japan	Decision (Unanimous)	3	3:00
2005-09-24	Win	(Korea) Chung Hyo Son	IKMF in Korea	South Korea	KO (Majority)	4	1:47
Wins inaugural IKMF Asia Lightweight Title.
2005-06-24	Loss	(Japan) Makoto Kimura	MA Japan Kick DETERMINATION	Tokyo, Japan	Decision (Unanimous)	3	3:00
2005-03-18	Win	(Korea) Kim Pan Su	SNKA RUSH !	Tokyo, Japan	Decision (Majority)	3	3:00
2004-11-19	Loss	(Japan) Satoruvashicoba	AJKF The Championship, All Japan Lightweight Championship Tournament, Semi Final	Tokyo, Japan	KO (Left Hook)	2	0:31
2004-08-22	Loss	(Netherlands) Mourad Tijarti	AJKF SUPER FIGHT -LIGHTNING-	Tokyo, Japan	TKO (Doctor Stoppage)	1	1:44
2004-04-16	Loss	(Mongolia) Tsogto Amara	AJKF All Japan Lightweight Tournament 2004 FINAL STAGE, Semi Final	Tokyo, Japan	Decision (Unanimous)	3	3:00
2004-04-16	Win	(Japan) Makoto Nishiyama	AJKF All Japan Lightweight Tournament 2004 2nd.STAGE	Tokyo, Japan	Decision (Unanimous)	3	3:00
2004-03-13	Win	(Japan) Kaito	AJKF All Japan Lightweight Tournament 2004 1st.STAGE	Tokyo, Japan	Decision (Majority)	3	3:00
2003-11-23	Loss	(Japan) Satoshi Kobayashi	AJKF "SCRAMBLE"	Tokyo, Japan	Decision (Unanimous)	3	3:00
2003-09-07	Win	(Japan) Takenobu Uesugi	AJKF "DEAD HEAT"	Tokyo, Japan	Decision (Unanimous)	3	3:00
2003-06-20	Win	(Japan) Hiroshi Seki	AJKF "DEAD HEAT"	Tokyo, Japan	Decision (Unanimous)	3	3:00
2002-05-30	Win	(Japan) Rascal Taka	AJKF vs J-NETWORK "MOVEMENT"	Tokyo, Japan	Decision (Unanimous)	3	3:00
2002-01-20	Draw	(Japan) Kenshi Nakamura	J-NETWORK MAKING J-BLOODS	Tokyo, Japan	Decision	3	3:00
2001-07-17	Loss	(Japan) Jun Inaba	J-NETWORK THE CRUSADE II	Tokyo, Japan	KO	2	3:00
2001-05-31	Draw	(Thailand) Rittichai Payanan	J-NETWORK MAKING THE ROAD-3	Tokyo, Japan	Decision	3	3:00
2001-03-23	Loss	(Japan) Kenshi Nakamura	J-NETWORK THE CRUSADE	Tokyo, Japan	Decision (Majority)	3	3:00
2000-12-25	Win	(Japan) Ryo Takemura	J-NETWORK SHANGURILA-FIN	Tokyo, Japan	Decision (Unanimous)	3	3:00
2000-11-19	Loss	(Japan) Izumi Yusaku	J-NETWORK	Tokyo, Japan	Decision (Unanimous)	3	3:00
2000-10-17	Win	(Japan) Ryusei Kasumoto	J-NETWORK SHANGURILA-3	Tokyo, Japan	Decision (Unanimous)	3	3:00
2000-07-31	Win	(Japan) Hideki Uchida	J-NETWORK SHANGURILA-2	Tokyo, Japan	Decision (Unanimous)	3	3:00
Legend: Win Loss Draw/No contest Notes
