= Khunsuk Sitporamet =

Thai former professional Muay Thai fighter

- Born: Chamnarn Chimnok; December 5, 1978 (age 47); Kaeng Khro, Chaiyaphum, Thailand
- Other names: Khunsuk Phetsupaphan (ขุนศึก เพชรสุภาพรรณ); Khunsuk Sunwelarewadee (ขุนศึก ศูนย์เวลาเรวดี)
- Nickname: Roman Warrior (นักรบโรมัน); Dark Horse Knight (อัศวินม้ามืด)
- Division: Featherweight; Super Featherweight; Lightweight; Super Lightweight
- Style: Muay Thai (Muay Tae)
- Stance: Orthodox
- Team: Phetsupaphan; Sun Wela Rewadee
- Trainer: Ajarn Yay Muangsuphan; Pumpichai Jiranairm

Chamnarn Chimnok (Thai: ชำนาญ ฉิมนอก; December 5, 1978), known professionally as Khunsuk Sitporamet (Thai: ขุนศึก ศิษย์ปรเมศร์), is a Thai former professional Muay Thai fighter. He is a former two-time Lumpinee Stadium and one-time Rajadamnern Stadium champion across two divisions.

== Biography and career ==
Khunsuk started training in Muay Thai at the age of twelve and made his Bangkok debut fighting out of the Sun Wela Rewadee camp. Khunsuk made a name in the mid 1990s under the Aswindam promotion and had the opportunity to join the more prestigious camp Phetsupaphan located in Phetchaburi where he would train alongside other champions such as Petchmanee Phetsupaphan and Namsuk Phetsupaphan. By the time Khunsuk was twenty years old he had defeated many notable fighters including Kruekchai Kaewsamrit. Samkor Kiatmontep, Mathee Jadeepitak and Thewaritnoi Chumpornpitak.
On March 26, 1999, Khunsuk defeated Lamnamoon Sor.Sumalee by decision and took his Lumpinee Stadium Super Featherweight title. He successfully defended the title against Attachai Por.Yosanan before moving up in weight and taking the Lumpinee Stadium Lightweight title from Kaolan Kaovichit. After going undefeated in 1999 Khunsuk was in position to win the Sports Authority of Thailand Fighter of the Year award. His opponent for the trophy was Namsaknoi Yudthagarngamtorn, the two would be matched on February 29, 2000, at the Lumpinee Stadium. Namsaknoi won the fight by decision.

On December 14, 2002, Khunsuk entered the Toyota Marathon tournament at the Lumpinee Stadium. In the quarterfinals he defeated Phetnamek Sor.Siriwat by decision before losing to Buakaw Por.Pramuk in the semifinals.

Khunsuk and Buakaw Por.Pramuk rematched at the Omnoi Stadium on September 5, 2003, for the vacant Lightweight title. Buakaw won the fight by decision once again.

One of the main rivalries of Khunsuk's career was against Jean-Charles Skarbowsky. They fought five times, with Khunsuk winning only once on December 5, 2004, as part of the S1 tournament won by Khunsuk at the King's birthday event. On February 18, 2005, Khunsuk faced Skarbowsky for the third time at the Lumpinee Stadium. Khunsuk lost the fight by decision.

After retiring from competition, Khunsuk became a Muay Thai trainer. He spent years working in Hong Kong before having to return to Thailand in 2016 when he contracted bone tuberculosis.

== Titles and honours ==
- Rajadamnern Stadium
  - 1997 Rajadamnern Stadium Super Featherweight (130 lbs) Champion
- Lumpinee Stadium
  - 1999 Lumpinee Stadium Super Featherweight (130 lbs) Champion
    - One successful title defense
  - 1999 Lumpinee Stadium Lightweight (135 lbs) Champion
- Kings Cup
  - 2004 S1 -70 kg Tournament Winner

== Fight record ==
Muay Thai Record (Incomplete)
Date	Result	Opponent	Event	Location	Method	Round	Time
	Loss	(Thailand) Ekapon Junk		Hong Kong	TKO	3	
2007-08-18	Win	(England) Phil Mcalpine	Omnoi Stadium	Samut Sakhon, Thailand	Decision	5	3:00
2006-06-05	Draw	(Thailand) Phetnamek Sor.Siriwat	Daorungchujarean, Rajadamnern Stadium	Bangkok, Thailand	Decision	5	3:00
2006-05-03	Loss	(Thailand) Jaroenchai Kesagym	Daorungchujarean, Rajadamnern Stadium	Bangkok, Thailand	Decision	5	3:00
2006-03-20	Loss	(Thailand) Jaroenchai Kesagym	Daorungchujarean, Rajadamnern Stadium	Bangkok, Thailand	Decision	5	3:00
2005-11-22	Loss	(Thailand) Phetnamek Sor.Siriwat	Lumpinee Stadium	Bangkok, Thailand	Decision	5	3:00
For the Lumpinee Stadium Super Lightweight (140 lbs) title.
2005-10-07	Draw	(Thailand) Phetnamek Sor.Siriwat	Paianan, Lumpinee Stadium	Bangkok, Thailand	Decision	5	3:00
2005-09-09	Loss	(Thailand) Naruepol Fairtex	Paianun, Lumpinee Stadium	Bangkok, Thailand	Decision (Unanimous)	5	3:00
For the vacant Thailand Super-lightweight (140 lbs) title.
2005-06-04	Loss	(France) Jean-Charles Skarbowsky	Omnoi Stadium	Samut Sakhon, Thailand	TKO (ref stoppage)	4	
2005-04-30	Win	(Thailand) Phetnamek Sor.Siriwat	Omnoi Stadium	Samut Sakhon, Thailand	Decision	5	3:00
2005-03-25	Loss	(France) Jean-Charles Skarbowsky	Petchsupapan, Lumpinee Stadium	Bangkok, Thailand	Decision	5	3:00
2005-02-18	Loss	(France) Jean-Charles Skarbowsky	Petchsupapan, Lumpinee Stadium	Bangkok, Thailand	Decision	5	3:00
2004-12-05	Win	(Czech Republic) Michal Hangsut	King’s Birthday - S1 Tournament, Final	Thailand	Decision	5	3:00
Wins the 2004 King's Cup S1 Tournament -70kg title.
2004-12-05	Win	(Thailand) Wanlop Sitpholek	King’s Birthday- S1 Tournament, Semifinals	Thailand	Decision	5	3:00
2004-12-05	Win	(France) Jean-Charles Skarbowsky	King’s Birthday- S1 Tournament, Quarterfinals	Thailand	Decision	5	3:00
2004-08-14	Loss	(Thailand) Nopadej Skindiew Gym	Omnoi Stadium	Samut Sakhon, Thailand	Decision	5	3:00
2004-07-22	Draw	(Thailand) Nopadej Skindiew Gym	Phetsupapan, Rajadamnern Stadium	Bangkok, Thailand	Decision	5	3:00
2004-06-01	Loss	(Thailand) Nontachai Sit-O	Phetsupapan, Lumpinee Stadium	Bangkok, Thailand	KO	4	
2004-04-10	Win	(Thailand) Mangkong Kiatsomkorn		Samut Sakhon, Thailand	Decision	5	3:00
2003-11-18	Loss	(Thailand) Buakaw Banchamek	Por.Pramuk, Lumpinee Stadium	Bangkok, Thailand	Decision	5	3:00
2003-10-07	Loss	(France) Jean-Charles Skarbowsky	Petchsupapan, Lumpinee Stadium	Bangkok, Thailand	TKO (doctor stoppage)	4	
2003-09-05	Loss	(Thailand) Buakaw Banchamek	Omnoi Stadium	Samut Sakhon, Thailand	Decision	5	3:00
For the vacant Omnoi Stadium Lightweight (135 lbs) title.
2003-05-31	Loss	(Thailand) Buakaw Banchamek	Omnoi Stadium	Samut Sakhon, Thailand	Decision	5	3:00
2003-05-02	Loss	(Thailand) Samkor Kiatmontep	Lumpinee Stadium	Bangkok, Thailand	Decision	5	3:00
2003-03-28	Win	(Thailand) Samkor Kiatmontep	Petchyindee, Lumpinee Stadium	Bangkok, Thailand	Decision	5	3:00
2003-03-04	Win	(Thailand) Nontachai Kiatwallop	Lumpinee Stadium	Bangkok, Thailand	Decision	5	3:00
2003-01-14	Loss	(Thailand) Chokdee Por.Pramuk	Phetpanomrung, Lumpinee Stadium	Bangkok, Thailand	Decision	5	3:00
2002-12-14	Loss	(Thailand) Buakaw Banchamek	Lumpinee Stadium - Toyota Marathon, Semi-finals	Bangkok, Thailand	Decision	3	3:00
2002-12-14	Win	(Thailand) Phetnamek Sor.Siriwat	Lumpinee Stadium - Toyota Marathon, Quarter-finals	Bangkok, Thailand	Decision	3	3:00
2002-06-30	Loss	(Thailand) Nopadej Skindiew Gym	Channel 7 Stadium	Bangkok, Thailand	Decision	5	3:00
2001-05-11	Draw	(Thailand) Samkor Kiatmontep	Lumpinee Stadium	Bangkok, Thailand	Decision	5	3:00
2000-11-04	Loss	(Thailand) Namsaknoi Yudthagarngamtorn	Lumpinee Stadium	Bangkok, Thailand	Decision	5	3:00
2000-08-06	Draw	(Thailand) Huasai Sor.Phumphanmuang	Fairtex, Lumpinee Stadium	Bangkok, Thailand	Decision	5	3:00
2000-??-??	Loss	(Thailand) Kaolan Kaovichit	Lumpinee Stadium	Phetchaburi, Thailand	Decision	5	3:00
2000-02-29	Loss	(Thailand) Namsaknoi Yudthagarngamtorn	Lumpinee Stadium	Bangkok, Thailand	Decision	5	3:00
2000-01-29	Win	(Thailand) Kaoponglek Luksuratham	Lumpinee Stadium	Bangkok, Thailand	Decision	5	3:00
1999-09-21	Win	(Thailand) Kaolan Kaovichit		Phetchaburi, Thailand	Decision	5	3:00
1999-08-10	Win	(Thailand) Kaolan Kaovichit	Onesongchai + Fairtex, Lumpinee Stadium	Bangkok, Thailand	KO	4	
Wins the Lumpinee Stadium Lightweight (135 lbs) title.
1999-07-？	Win	(Thailand) Kaolan Kaovichit	Lumpinee Stadium	Bangkok, Thailand	Decision	5	3:00
1999-06-22	Win	(Thailand) Samkor Kiatmontep	Lumpinee Stadium	Bangkok, Thailand	Decision	5	3:00
1999-05-11	Win	(Thailand) Attachai Por.Yosanan	Lumpinee Stadium	Bangkok, Thailand	Decision	5	3:00
Defends the Lumpinee Stadium Super Featherweight (130 lbs) title.
1999-03-26	Win	(Thailand) Lamnamoon Sor.Sumalee	Lumpinee Stadium	Bangkok, Thailand	Decision	5	3:00
Wins the Lumpinee Stadium Super Featherweight (130 lbs) title.
1999-02-10	Win	(Thailand) Lamnamoon Sor.Sumalee	Lumpinee Stadium	Bangkok, Thailand	Decision	5	3:00
1998-10-10	Win	(Thailand) Mathee Jadeepitak	Lumpinee Stadium	Bangkok, Thailand	Decision	5	3:00
1998-03-03	Loss	(Thailand) Samkor Kiatmontep	Lumpinee Stadium	Bangkok, Thailand	Decision	5	3:00
1997-10-12	Loss	(Thailand) Bakjo Sor.Panuch	Aswindam, Rajadamnern Stadium	Bangkok, Thailand	Decision	5	3:00
?-09-30	Win	(Thailand) Therdkiat Sitthepitak	Lumpinee Stadium	Bangkok, Thailand	Decision	5	3:00
1997-	Win	(Thailand) Thewaritnoi SKV Gym	Rajadamnern Stadium	Bangkok, Thailand	Decision	5	3:00
Wins the Rajadamnern Stadium Super Featherweight (130 lbs) title.
1997-	Win	(Thailand) Bakjo Sor.Panuch		Bangkok, Thailand	Decision	5	3:00
1997-	Win	(Thailand) Thewaritnoi Chumpornpitak		Bangkok, Thailand	Decision	5	3:00
1997-06-22	Win	(Thailand) Samkor Kiatmontep	Lumpinee Stadium	Bangkok, Thailand	Decision	5	3:00
1997-03-31	Loss	(Thailand) Thewaritnoi Chumpornpitak	Aswindam, Rajadamnern Stadium	Bangkok, Thailand	Decision	5	3:00
1996-12-16	Win	(Thailand) Thewaritnoi Chumphonphitak	Phetmahanak, Rajadamnern Stadium	Bangkok, Thailand	Decision	5	3:00
1996-11-18	Win	(Thailand) Michael Thammakasem	Rajadamnern Stadium	Bangkok, Thailand	Decision	5	3:00
1996-	Loss	(Thailand) Michael Thammakasem	Rajadamnern Stadium	Bangkok, Thailand	Decision	5	3:00
1996-05-29	Win	(Thailand) Surin SasiprapaGym	Rajadamnern Stadium	Bangkok, Thailand	Decision	5	3:00
1996-04-18	Win	(Thailand) Manaschai Wacharayothin	Rajadamnern Stadium	Bangkok, Thailand	Decision	5	3:00
1996-03-21	Win	(Thailand) Rakkhangkaew Sakmuangklaeng	Rajadamnern Stadium	Bangkok, Thailand	Decision	5	3:00
1995-12-14	Win	(Thailand) Pepsi Sor.Rewadee	Rajadamnern Stadium	Bangkok, Thailand	Decision	5	3:00
1995-10-19	Win	(Thailand) Thanay PodSarina	Rajadamnern Stadium	Bangkok, Thailand	Decision	5	3:00
1994-08-01	Loss	(Thailand) Kruekchai Kaewsamrit	Aswindam, Rajadamnern Stadium	Bangkok, Thailand	Decision	5	3:00
Legend: Win Loss Draw/No contest Notes
