= Lamsongkram Chuwattana =

Thai middleweight kickboxer

- Born: Supachai Chansot; December 12, 1983 (age 42); Chaiyaphum, Thailand
- Other names: Ramsongkram Suwanharnjabee
- Nationality: Thai
- Height: 1.83 m (6 ft 0 in)
- Weight: 78 kg (172 lb; 12.3 st)
- Division: Middleweight
- Style: Muay Thai
- Fighting out of: Bangkok, Thailand
- Team: Chuwattana Gym
- Trainer: Kongdet Chuwattana

Kickboxing record
- Total: 300
- Wins: 245
- By knockout: 51
- Losses: 48
- Draws: 7
- Last updated on: June 28, 2012

Lamsongkram Chuwattana (Thai: ลำสงคราม ชูวัฒนะ; born December 12, 1983) is a Thai middleweight kickboxer. He is the former WBC World Middleweight Muay Thai champion, which he won on February 25, 2007, over Steven Wakeling. He was known as Ramsongkram Suwanharnjabee before he moved to Chuwattana Gym.

== Career ==
The Japanese boxing commission banned boxing promoters from offering Lamsongkram for boxing matches in Japan 2005 because of 5 consecutive losses by knock out.

== Titles ==
- Rajadamnern Stadium
  - 2012 Rajadamnern Stadium Middleweight champion
  - 2005 Rajadamnern Stadium Middleweight champion
- World Muaythai Council (WMC)
  - 2010 WMC World Middleweight champion
  - 2005 WMC/S1 Kings Cup Middleweight Tournament champion
- WBC Muaythai
  - 2007–2009 WBC World Middleweight champion
  - 2006 WBC Middleweight Interim World champion

== Fight record ==
Professional kickboxing record
245 wins (51 (T) KOs, 191 decisions), 49 losses, 7 draws
Date	Result	Opponent	Event	Location	Method	Round	Time
2014-12-27	Loss	(China) Zhang Kaiyin	Kunlun Fight 9	China, Shangqiu	Decision (unanimous)	3	
2012-02-29	Win	(Sweden) Toby Kaewsamrit	Rajadamnern Stadium	Bangkok, Thailand	TKO (cut)	3	
Wins Rajadamnern Stadium Middleweight title.
2012-02-04	Loss	(China) Xu Zhenguang	Southern Shaolin Kung Fu tournament world	Putian, FujianChina，	KO (punches)	1	0:40
2011-11-05	Win	(China) Xu Yan	Legends of Heroes: Muaythai vs Kung, ChangSha	China	TKO (knee)	1	0:00
2010-10-09	Win	(China) Cao Yaomin	Arena of Stars	Pahang, Malaysia	Decision	5	3:00
2010-08-09	Win	(Thailand) Wehaj KingBoxing	Rajadamnern Stadium	Bangkok, Thailand	TKO	4	
Wins WMC World Middleweight title.
2010-06-12	Loss	(Australia) John Wayne Parr	Muaythai Warriors	Melbourne, Australia	Decision (unanimous)	5	3:00
2009-12-19	Loss	(China) Zhang Kaiyin	Chinese Kung Fu vs Muaythai at Lingnan Pearl Stadium	Foshan, China	KO (punches)	3	1:08
2009-11-28	Loss	(France) Yohan Lidon	A1 World Combat Cup	Paris, France	KO	1	
Loses WBC Muay Thai World Middleweight title.
2009-04-02	Win	(Thailand) Nungjakawan Or.Srisomboon	Rajadamnern Stadium	Bangkok, Thailand	TKO (cut from elbow)	1	
2009-01-18	Win	(Russia) Pavel Abozny	WBC Muaythai event	Beijing, China	TKO (low kicks)	3	0:57
Defends WBC Muay Thai World Middleweight title.
2008-12-20	Loss	(Thailand) Yodsaenklai Fairtex	Boxe-Thai Guinea tournament	Malabo, Equatorial Guinea	KO (right uppercut)	1	2:50
2008-12-20	Win	(France) Farid Villaume	Boxe-Thai Guinea tournament	Malabo, Equatorial Guinea	Decision (unanimous)	3	3:00
2008-12-20	Loss	(Turkey) Ali Gunyar	Boxe-Thai Guinea tournament	Malabo, Equatorial Guinea	Disq. (elbow)		
2008-11-30	Loss	(Suriname) Rayen Simson	Slamm 5 "Nederland vs Thailand"	Almere, Netherlands	TKO (doctor stoppage)	2	
2008-09-04	Win	(Canada) Mukai Maromo	World Championships Muay Thai	Highland, California	KO (body shot)	2	1:23
Defends WBC Muay Thai World Middleweight title.
2008-06-20	Win	(France) Farid Villaume	International Muay Thai Fight Night	Montego Bay, Jamaica	Decision	5	3:00
Defends WBC Muay Thai World Middleweight title.
2008-04-28	Win	(Thailand) Rambo Panyathip	Rajadamnern Stadium	Bangkok, Thailand	TKO	3	
2008-01-03	Loss	(Thailand) Nontachai Sit-O	Rajadamnern Stadium	Bangkok, Thailand	Decision	5	3:00
2007-10-27	Loss	(Netherlands) Nieky Holzken	SLAMM "One Night in Bangkok"	Antwerp, Belgium	Decision	3	3:00
2007-09-08	Win	(France) Yohan Lidon	World Championships Muay Thai	Los Angeles	Decision	5	3:00
Defends WBC Muay Thai World Middleweight title.
2007-04-29	Win	(Thailand) Chaowalit Jockygym	Rajadamnern Stadium	Bangkok, Thailand	TKO	4	
2007-03-29	Loss	(Thailand) Nontachai Sit-O	Rajadamnern Stadium	Bangkok, Thailand	Decision	5	3:00
Loses Rajadamnern Stadium Middleweight title.
2007-02-25	Win	(United Kingdom) Steven Wakeling	Thunder & Lightning 10	London, England	Decision	5	3:00
Wins WBC Muay Thai World Middleweight title.
2006-12-21	Win	(Thailand) Rewki Moko	Rajadamnern Stadium	Bangkok, Thailand	TKO	3	
2006-11-05	Win	(Thailand) Chaowalit Jockygym	Rajadamnern Stadium	Bangkok, Thailand	Decision	5	3:00
2006-09-24	Win	(Thailand) Wehaj KingBoxing	Rajadamnern Stadium	Bangkok, Thailand	TKO	2	
2006-06-03	Win	(Kyrgyzstan) Alan Ofeyo	WBC Middleweight	Bishkek, Kyrgyzstan	Decision	5	3:00
Wins interim WBC Muay Thai World Middleweight title.
2006-02-09	Win	(Thailand) Kaoklai Kaennorsing	Rajadamnern Stadium	Bangkok, Thailand	Decision	5	3:00
Defends Rajadamnern Stadium Middleweight title.
2006-01-05	Loss	(France) Jean-Charles Skarbowsky	WMC Superfights	Bangkok, Thailand	KO (punches)	1	
2005-12-05	Win	(Thailand) Wanlop Sitpholek	Kings Cup, WMC/S1 World Championship	Bangkok, Thailand	Decision	3	3:00
Wins the Kings Cup WMC/S1 Tournament.
2005-12-05	Win	(Australia) Bruce Macfie	Kings Cup, WMC/S1 World Championship	Bangkok, Thailand	Decision	3	3:00
2005-12-05	Win	(Italy) Matteo Sciacca	Kings Cup, WMC/S1 World Championship	Bangkok, Thailand	TKO (elbow)	1	0:30
2005-10-24	Win	(Thailand) Jakapan Kor Suit	Rajadamnern Stadium	Bangkok, Thailand	TKO	1	
2005-08-30	Loss	(New Zealand) Shane Chapman	HKMTA Hong Kong Championships	Hong Kong	Decision (split)	5	3:00
For the HKMTA Middleweight title.
2005-08-22	Draw	(Japan) Ryuji Goto	SNKA Titans 2nd	Tokyo, Japan	Decision	3	3:00
2005-06-23	Win	(Australia) Adam Bailey	Rajadamnern Stadium	Bangkok, Thailand	TKO	2	
2005-03-12	Win	(Japan) Toshio Matsumoto	Rajadamnern Stadium	Bangkok, Thailand	Decision	5	
Defends Rajadamnern Stadium Middleweight title.
2004-12-23	Win	(Japan) Hayato	Rajadamnern Stadium	Bangkok, Thailand	Decision	5	
Wins vacant Rajadamnern Stadium Middleweight title.
2004-11-28	Win	(Thailand) Rambo Panyatip	Rajadamnern Stadium	Bangkok, Thailand	Decision	5	3:00
2004-09-05	Win	(Thailand) Rambo Panyatip	Rajadamnern Stadium	Bangkok, Thailand	Decision	5	3:00
2004-04-14	Win	(Thailand) Chuchai Bor ChorRorSorng	Rajadamnern Stadium	Bangkok, Thailand	Decision	5	3:00
2003-06-30	Win	(Sudan) Faisal Zakaria	Rajadamnern Stadium	Bangkok, Thailand	Decision	5	3:00
2003-06-04	Win	(Japan) Kengo Yamagami	Rajadamnern Stadium	Bangkok, Thailand	Decision	5	3:00
2003-05-26	Loss	(Japan) Toshio Matsumoto		Japan	KO	1	
2003-04-26	Win	(Japan) Kengo Yamagami	Omnoi Stadium	Bangkok, Thailand	TKO	3	
2003-03-30	Loss	(Thailand) Kaoklai Kaennorsing	Rajadamnern Stadium	Bangkok, Thailand	TKO	3	
2003-01-27	Loss	(Thailand) Kanongsaklek KT Gym	Rajadamnern Stadium	Bangkok, Thailand	TKO	1	
2002-11-11	Loss	(Thailand) Big Ben Chor Praram 6	Rajadamnern Stadium	Bangkok, Thailand	TKO	2	
2002-07-27	Loss	(Japan) Toshio Matsumoto		Japan	KO	1	
2002-06-10	Loss	(Thailand) Chalumsak Chuwattana	Rajadamnern Stadium	Bangkok, Thailand	Decision	5	3:00
Legend: Win Loss Draw/no contest Notes

== See also ==
- The Contender Asia
- List of male kickboxers
