= Satoshi Kobayashi =

Japanese kickboxer

- Born: 小林聡; March 16, 1972 (age 54); Nagano, Japan
- Other names: Norainu
- Nationality: Japanese
- Height: 170 cm (5 ft 7 in)
- Weight: 63 kg (139 lb; 9.9 st)
- Style: Kickboxing
- Stance: Southpaw
- Fighting out of: Tokyo, Japan
- Team: Tokyo Hokusei Gym
- Trainer: Toshio Fujiwara

Satoshi Kobayashi is a Japanese Muay Thai fighter and kickboxer, fighting out of Tokyo, Japan.

== Titles and accomplishments ==
- 1996 NJKF Lightweight Champion
- 1998 Kick Union Lightweight Champion
- 2000 AJKF Lightweight Champion
- 2000 WKA Muay Thai World Lightweight Champion
- 2000 WPKC Muay Thai World Lightweight Champion

== Kickboxing record ==
Professional kickboxing record
46 wins (34 (T)KOs), 21 losses, 2 draws, 0 no contests
Date	Result	Opponent	Event	Location	Method	Round	Time
2006-11-12	Loss	(Thailand) Jaroenchai Jor Rachadakon	AJKF Solid Fist	Tokyo, Japan	Decision (unanimous)	5	3:00
2006-06-11	Win	(Thailand) Yodkunklai Nongkamgym	AJKF Triumph	Tokyo, Japan	KO (left hook to the body)	1	2:20
2006-03-19	Loss	(Thailand) Yodkunklai Nongkamgym	AJKF SWORD FIGHT 2006	Tokyo, Japan	TKO (doctor stoppage)	2	0:28
2005-12-05	Win	(Thailand) Rittidet Wor.Surapon	AJKF Fujiwara Festival 2005	Tokyo, Japan	TKO (3 knockdowns)	3	2:57
2005-09-16	Win	(United Kingdom) Matthew Johnston	AJKF STACK OF ARMS	Tokyo, Japan	KO (right hook)	2	1:15
2005-07-24	Win	(Australia) David Lee Hoy	AJKF SUPER FIGHT Japan VS World ・5vs5	Tokyo, Japan	TKO (corner stoppage)	3	1:45
2005-04-17	Win	(Italy) Jonathan Zarbo	AJKF NEVER GIVE UP	Tokyo, Japan	KO (3 knockdowns/left body hook)	1	1:32
2005-01-04	Loss	(Japan) Haruaki Otsuki	AJKF Survivor	Tokyo, Japan	KO (punches)	3	2:31
Lost the WPKC World Muay Thai Lightweight title.
2004-11-27	Loss	(Thailand) Sak Kaoponlek		Italy	TKO (doctor stoppage)	2	
2004-08-22	Win	(New Zealand) Andy Donaldson	AJKF SUPER FIGHT -LIGHTNING-	Tokyo, Japan	KO (low kick)	4	2:20
2004-04-16	Loss	(Japan) Satoruvashicoba	AJKF, Lightweight Tournament 2004 2nd.STAGE	Tokyo, Japan	Decision (unanimous)	3	3:00
2004-02-25	Win	(Korea) Kim Song Sub	AJKF DOG FIGHT!	Tokyo, Japan	KO	2	2:03
2003-11-23	Win	(Japan) Koji Yoshimoto	AJKF SCRAMBLE	Tokyo, Japan	Decision (unanimous)	3	3:00
2003-05-23	Loss	(Mongolia) Tsogto Amara	AJKF, Lightweight Tournament Semi Final	Tokyo, Japan	Decision (majority)	3	3:00
2003-03-08	Loss	(Korea) Lim Chi-bin	AJKF, Lightweight Tournament Quarter Final	Tokyo, Japan	KO	2	1:53
2002-12-14	Loss	(Thailand) Buakaw Banchamek	D4D Toyota Cup, Final Lumpinee Stadium	Bangkok, Thailand	Decision (unanimous)	3	3:00
For the Toyota Muay Thai Marathon Tournament 140lbs championship.
2002-12-14	Win	(Australia) Timo	D4D Toyota Cup, Semi Final Lumpinee Stadium	Bangkok, Thailand	KO (low kick)	2	0:33
2002-12-14	Win	(Cameroon) Elvis	D4D Toyota Cup, Quarter Final Lumpinee Stadium	Bangkok, Thailand	KO (knee)	1	2:09
2002-11-17	Win	(Italy) Roberto Pasiri	AJKF BACK FROM HELL-I	Tokyo, Japan	KO (knee)	2	2:03
2002-09-06	Loss	(Thailand) Samkor Kiatmontep	A.J.K.F. GOLDEN TRIGGER	Tokyo, Japan	KO (low kicks)	3	2:10
2002-07-21	Win	(Hungary) Joseph Pulic	AJKF CRUSH!	Tokyo, Japan	KO	3	0:35
Defends the WPKC Muay Thai World Lightweight title.
2002-03-17	Loss	(Thailand) Namsaknoi Yudthagarngamtorn	A.J.K.F. "OVER the EDGE"	Tokyo, Japan	TKO (referee stoppage)	2	2:19
2002-01-04	Win	(Japan) Hisayuki Kanazawa	AJKF KICK MIND	Tokyo, Japan	Decision (unanimous)	5	3:00
2001-11-30	Win	(Belgium) Osman Yigin	AJKF LIGHT ON!	Tokyo, Japan	KO (right hook)	1	1:24
2001-09-07	Win	(Thailand) Tepparit Por.Tawatchai	AJKF REVOLVER	Tokyo, Japan	KO (punches)	4	2:01
2001-07-22	Win	(Netherlands) Marshall Elizabeth	AJKF BLAZE UP	Tokyo, Japan	KO	2	2:50
2001-06-10	Win	(Thailand) Rurawee Sarawite	AJKF KICKBOXING "DOG FIGHT"	Tokyo, Japan	KO	2	1:57
2001-05-17	Win	(France) Jean-Charles Skarbowsky	AJKF JUST BRING IT!	Tokyo, Japan	KO (punches)	2	1:31
2001-03-16	Loss	(Thailand) Saddam Kietyongyuth	AJKF CROSS FIRE-I	Tokyo, Japan	Decision (unanimous)	5	3:00
2000-12-09	Win	(Italy) Andre Roncci	AJKF THE CHAMPIONSHIP	Tokyo, Japan	Decision (unanimous)	5	3:00
Defends the WPKC Muay Thai World Lightweight title.
2000-12-09	Win	(Italy) Marco Costaguta		Pordenone, Italy	Decision (unanimous)	5	3:00
Wins the WPKC Muay Thai World Lightweight title.
2000-11-29	Win	(New Zealand) Daniel Hatch	AJKF LEGEND-X	Tokyo, Japan	KO (left hook)	2	1:03
2000-10-22	Win	(France) Christophe Leveque	AJKF LEGEND-IX	Tokyo, Japan	Decision (unanimous)	5	3:00
2000-07-30	Win	(Italy) Marco Costaguta	AJKF LEGEND-VIII	Tokyo, Japan	KO (knee)	4	3:00
Wins WKA Muay Thai World Lightweight title.
2000-06-20	Win	(Japan) Kazuya Asuka	AJKF LEGEND-VI	Tokyo, Japan	KO (low kick)	1	1:58
2000-05-24	Draw	(New Zealand) David Gahan	AJKF LEGEND-V	Tokyo, Japan	Decision	5	3:00
2000-03-16	Win	(France) Mohammed Yamani	AJKF LEGEND-III	Tokyo, Japan	KO (left hook)	1	2:07
2000-01-21	Win	(Japan) Hisayuki Kanazawa	AJKF LEGEND-I	Tokyo, Japan	Decision (unanimous)	5	3:00
Wins AJKF Lightweight title.
1999-11-22	Win	(Japan) Yoshiyuki Igarashi	AJKF WAVE-XIII	Tokyo, Japan	KO	3	2:23
1999-09-03	Win	(Japan) Ao Hayashi	AJKF	Tokyo, Japan	KO	2	
1999-07-13	Loss	(Japan) Yoshiyuki Igarashi	AJKF	Tokyo, Japan	Decision (unanimous)	5	3:00
1999-06-18	Win	(Japan) Kenichi Sato	MA Japan Kick	Tokyo, Japan	TKO	2	
1999-04-29	Win	(Thailand) Yodlak Sor.Jitpattana	Kick Union	Tokyo, Japan	TKO	5	
1999-01-22	Loss	(Thailand) Chanapek Gatchyindee	Kick Union	Tokyo, Japan	TKO	3	
1998-11-14	Win	(Japan) Tomohiro Hoka	Shootboxing Ground Zero Tokyo	Tokyo, Japan	Decision (unanimous)	5	3:00
1998-10-25	Win	(Japan) Katsuhiro Ise	Kickboxing Champions All Stars	Japan	KO	2	0:55
1998-09-22	Win	(Japan) Nobimitsu Sudo	Kick Union	Japan	KO	2	0:55
Wins the Kick Union Lightweight title.
1998-07-24	Win	(Canada) Dias	Kick Union	Tokyo, Japan	TKO	2	
1998-04-12	Loss	(Netherlands) Oktay Ozkan	NKBB & MTBN Mjiro Gym KO POWER tournament	Netherlands	Decision (unanimous)	5	3:00
1997-09-28	Win	(Japan) Hisayuki Kanazawa	AJKF	Tokyo, Japan	KO	4	
1997-04-06	Win	(Japan) Somchai Takatsu	NJKF Beginning of Truth Part 5	Tokyo, Japan	Decision (unanimous)	3	2:31
Defends the NJKF Lightweight title.
1997-01-19	Loss	(Thailand) Kaonar Sor.Kettarinchan	NJKF	Tokyo, Japan	TKO	5	
1996-12-08	Win	(Japan) Kyoji Katsuyama	Power Nine gym	Gotō Islands, Japan	Decision (unanimous)	5	3:00
1996-10-06	Win	(Japan) Naohiro Saito	NJKF 1st event '96 Japan Cup 6 weight Title Match	Tokyo, Japan	KO	1	1:10
Wins the NJKF Lightweight title.
1996-04-29	Win	(Japan) Takeshi Imai	AJKF	Tokyo, Japan	TKO	4	
1995-09-29	Loss	(Korea) Choi	AJKF	Tokyo, Japan	KO	1	
1995-07-02	Draw	(Korea) Choi	AJKF	Tokyo, Japan	Decision	3	3:00
1995-03-23	Loss	(Thailand) Surasak Sor.Sentorn	Rajadamnern Stadium	Bangkok, Thailand	TKO	3	
1995-01-07	Loss	(Japan) Yasuhiro Uchida	AJKF	Tokyo, Japan	KO	3	
1994-10-30	Win	(Japan) Kenichi Sugita	AJKF	Tokyo, Japan	KO	3	
1994-06-17	Win	(Japan) Aou Hayashi	AJKF	Tokyo, Japan	KO	1	
1994-04-23	Win	(Japan) Takayuki Miyamoto	AJKF	Tokyo, Japan	Decision (unanimous)	3	3:00
1994-03-26	Win	(Japan) Koji Kabuto	AJKF	Tokyo, Japan	Decision (majority)	3	3:00
1994-02-28	Win	(Thailand) Parksaknoi Chorchuchit		Tokyo, Japan	Decision (unanimous)	5	3:00
1993	Loss	(United Kingdom)		London	Decision		
1993-06-20	Loss	(Japan) Takaya Sato	AJKF	Tokyo, Japan	KO	2	
1992-12-19	Win	(Japan) Yuko Miyamoto	AJKF One Truth 9th	Tokyo, Japan	KO	2	1:06
1992-05-30	Loss	(Japan) Yasuhiro Uchida	AJKF One Truth 3rd	Tokyo, Japan	Decision (unanimous)	3	3:00
1991-11-17	Win	(Korea) Han Man Gu	Kunguk-Do Korea-Japan International Match	South Korea	KO	2	
1991-10-26	Win	(Japan) Morimichi Nakajima	AJKF SOAR INTO THE SPACE Chapter VI	Tokyo, Japan	Decision (unanimous)	3	3:00
1989-06-10	Loss	(Japan) Hiroyuki Endo	Japan Kickboxing Federation	Tokyo, Japan	KO	1	1:29
1988-05-14	Loss	(Japan) Shusaku Endo	Japan Kickboxing Federation	Tokyo, Japan	KO	1	1:14
1987-02-13	Win	(Japan) Mitsuhiro Takagi	Japan Kickboxing Federation	Tokyo, Japan	KO	1	1:04
Legend: Win Loss Draw/no contest Notes
