= Samliam Singmanee =

Thai Muay Thai fighter

- Born: Chaiyuth Phetchsingoen (ชัยยุทธ เพชรสีเงิน); June 26, 1974; Ban Nongpling, Khao Ro, Thung Song, Nakhon Si Thammarat
- Died: November 4, 2015 (aged 41); Khao Ro, Thung Song, Nakhon Si Thammarat
- Native name: สามเหลี่ยม สิงห์มณี
- Nickname: Payak pan-lai (พยัคฆ์พันลาย) "Thousand-Striped Tiger"
- Height: 162 cm (5 ft 4 in)
- Weight: 47.6 kg (105 lb; 7.50 st)
- Division: Mini flyweight
- Style: Muay Thai; Fimeu (มวยฝีมือ)
- Stance: Orthodox
- Fighting out of: Nakhon Si Thammarat
- Team: Singmanee
- Years active: 1990s

Other information
- Occupation: Medium

Samliam Singmanee (Thai: สามเหลี่ยม สิงห์มณี; June 26, 1974 – November 4, 2015) was a Muay Thai fighter from Thailand who competed in the 1990s.

== Biography and career ==
Samliam born as Chaiyuth Phetchsingoen in 1974 in Thung Song district, Nakhon Si Thammarat province, southern region. He first trained in Muay Thai as a child with a relative. He first fought on the local circuit under the name "Jibjoi Luknongpling" (จิ๊บจ๊อย ลูกหนองปลิง), he then moved to the Sor.Pleonchit gym in Bangkok, changing his name at this occasion to "Puwanart Sor.Pleonchit" (ภูวนาท ส.เพลินจิต).

Later, he came back under the Singmanee gym in his hometown, training alongside fighters who were successful such as Hippy Singmanee and Kompayak Singmanee.

He was regarded as one of the best fighters in the lightest weight divisions, with a distinct style and technical proficiency.

== Retirement and death ==
After stopped his career, he practiced Dharma and became vegan. He was also a medium for the Lord Guan.

Samliam died on November 4, 2015, from a M16 rifle shot in front of a shrine he owned. He was 41 years old.

== Titles and honours ==
- Lumpinee Stadium
  - 1995 Lumpinee Stadium Mini Flyweight (105 lbs) Champion
  - 1995 Lumpinee Stadium Fighter of the Year
- Rajadamnern Stadium
  - 1995 Rajadamnern Stadium Mini Flyweight (105 lbs) Champion
- World Muaythai Council
  - 1995 WMC World 105 lbs champion

== Muay Thai record ==
Muay Thai record
Date	Result	Opponent	Event	Location	Method	Round	Time
1996-07-09	Loss	(Thailand) Ekachai Or.Chaibadan	Lumpinee Stadium	Bangkok, Thailand	Decision	5	3:00
Loses the Lumpinee Stadium Mini Flyweight (105 lbs) title.
1996-02-24	Loss	(Thailand) Kaolan Kaovichit	Lumpinee Stadium	Bangkok, Thailand	Decision	5	3:00
1995-12-08	Win	(Thailand) Ekachai Or.Chaibadan	Lumpinee Stadium	Bangkok, Thailand	Decision	5	3:00
Defends the Lumpinee Stadium Mini Flyweight (105 lbs) title and WMC World 105 lbs title.
1995-09-26	Win	(Thailand) Singsampan Kiatsingnoi	Lumpinee Stadium	Bangkok, Thailand	Decision	5	3:00
Defends the Lumpinee Stadium Mini Flyweight (105 lbs) title. Wins the Rajadamnern Stadium and inaugural WMC World 105 lbs titles.
1995-08-26	Win	(Thailand) Singsampan Kiatsingnoi	Lumpinee Stadium	Bangkok, Thailand	Decision	5	3:00
Wins the Lumpinee Stadium Mini Flyweight (105 lbs) title.
1995-06-09	Loss	(Thailand) Sakphaitoon Decharat	Lumpinee Stadium	Bangkok, Thailand	Decision	5	3:00
1995-04-28	Win	(Thailand) Denkaosaen Kaowichit	Onesongchai, Lumpinee Stadium	Bangkok, Thailand	Decision	5	3:00
1995-02-24	Win	(Thailand) Denkaosaen Kaowichit	Lumpinee Stadium	Bangkok, Thailand	Decision	5	3:00
1995-01-03	Win	(Thailand) Denkaosaen Kaowichit	Lumpinee Stadium	Bangkok, Thailand	KO (Punches)	3	
1994-09-09	Loss	(Thailand) Kongka Nor.Nakpathom	Lumpinee Stadium	Bangkok, Thailand	Decision	5	3:00
For the Lumpinee Stadium Mini Flyweight (105 lbs) title.
1994-06-17	Win	(Thailand) Chanarit Or.Bowin	Fairtex, Lumpinee Stadium	Bangkok, Thailand	KO (Elbow)	4	
1994-05-14	Win	(Thailand) Sod Looknongyangtoy	Lumpinee Stadium	Bangkok, Thailand	Decision	5	3:00
1994-04-30	Loss	(Thailand) Kongka Sor.Wanich	Chatuchok, Lumpinee Stadium	Bangkok, Thailand	Decision	5	3:00
1993-10-05	Loss	(Thailand) Sitthichai Phetbangprang		Chaiyaphum, Thailand	TKO	3	
1993-07-27	Loss	(Thailand) Kongka Sor.Wanich	Onesongchai, Lumpinee Stadium	Bangkok, Thailand	Decision	5	3:00
1993-03-29	Win	(Thailand) Phuwanai Sakmethee	Kiatsingnoi + Chaturong 14, Rajadamnern Stadium	Bangkok, Thailand	Decision	5	3:00
1993-02-28	Win	(Thailand) Chamuaklek Lukchaosuan	Yod Naomthong, Rajadamnern Stadium	Bangkok, Thailand	Decision	5	3:00
1993-02-05	Loss	(Thailand) Pichit Saksangmanee	Onesongchai, Lumpinee Stadium	Bangkok, Thailand	Decision	5	3:00

== Professional boxing record ==
1 fight	0 wins	1 loss
By decision	0	1

No.	Result	Record	Opponent	Type	Round	Date	Location	Notes
1	Loss	0–1	Pichitsak Saksaengmanee	PTS	6	Feb 5, 1993	Lumpinee Stadium, Bangkok, Thailand	
