= Eric Morel =

Puerto Rican boxer

Personal information
- Nickname: Little Hands Of Steel
- Nationality: American
- Born: Eric Arturo Morel; October 1, 1975 (age 51) San Juan, Puerto Rico
- Height: 5 ft 6 1/2 in (169 cm)
- Weight: Flyweight; Super flyweight; Bantamweight; Super bantamweight

Boxing career
- Reach: 70 in (178 cm)
- Stance: Orthodox

Boxing record
- Total fights: 50
- Wins: 46
- Win by KO: 23
- Losses: 4
Medal record
Men's Boxing
Representing United States
Goodwill Games
Bronze medal – third place	1994 Saint Petersburg	Light Flyweight

Eric Morel (born October 1, 1975) is a Puerto Rican-born former professional boxer. He held the World Boxing Association (WBA) world flyweight (112 lb) title from August 2000 to December 2003, making five title defenses.

== Amateur career ==
Morel had an outstanding amateur career, and was the National Golden Gloves Light Flyweight Champion in 1994. He also was a member of the 1996 US Olympic Team as a flyweight. His result was:

Lost to Maikro Romero (Cuba) 12–24

== Professional career ==
=== Flyweight ===
Morel was nicknamed "Little Hands Of Steel" during his boxing career. He turned professional in 1996 and won his first 33 bouts, including the WBA flyweight world title with a decision win over Sornpichai Kratingdaenggym in 2000 and the IBA super flyweight world title in 1998 against Víctor Burgos. He defended the world title five times with wins over Gilberto Keb Baas, Denkaosan Kaovichit, and Isidro García before losing it to Lorenzo Parra by decision in 2003.

=== Super Flyweight ===
He then moved up in weight and took on WBA super flyweight world title holder Martín Castillo in 2005, but lost a decision. Morel was scheduled to fight Z Gorres for the interim WBO bantamweight world title on November 14, 2009, but after the latter's last fight, he (Gorres) suffered a major injury that delayed his boxing career, so the fight was called off. He returned to the ring against Gerry Peñalosa February 13, 2010; That ended in a win for Eric Morel, lifting the interim WBO bantamweight world championship. He then defeated Juan Jose Beltran December 11, 2010. In 2012 he lost his last match to Léo Santa Cruz for the IBF bantamweight world title. Morel retired from boxing with a professional record of 46-4 (23 KO's).

== Legal Issues ==
Morel was sentenced to two years in prison and two years of extended supervision in October 2005 after he pleaded no contest to second-degree sexual assault of a drunken 15-year-old girl. Morel was held at the Fox Lake Correctional Institution. Morel registered as a sex offender in Wisconsin. Morel was released from prison in August 2007 after serving time for sexual assault.

== Professional boxing record ==
50 fights	46 wins	4 losses
By knockout	23	1
By decision	23	3

No.	Result	Record	Opponent	Type	Round, time	Date	Location	Notes
50	Loss	46–4	Léo Santa Cruz	RTD	5 (12)	2012-09-15	MGM Grand Garden Arena, Paradise, Nevada, U.S.	For IBF bantamweight title
49	Loss	46–3	Abner Mares	UD	12 (12)	2012-04-21	Don Haskins Center, El Paso, Texas, U.S.	For vacant WBC super bantamweight title
48	Win	46–2	Jose Silveira	UD	10 (10)	2011-12-03	Honda Center, Anaheim, California, U.S.	
47	Win	45–2	Daniel Quevedo	RTD	4 (10)	2011-08-13	Hard Rock Hotel and Casino, Las Vegas, Nevada, U.S.	
46	Win	44–2	Luis Maldonado	TKO	4 (10)	2011-04-01	Fantasy Springs Casino, Indio, California, U.S.	
45	Win	43–2	Juan Jose Beltran	UD	8 (8)	2010-12-11	Emerald Queen Casino, Tacoma, Washington, U.S.	
44	Win	42–2	Gerry Peñalosa	SD	12 (12)	2010-02-13	Las Vegas Hilton, Las Vegas, Nevada, U.S.	Won interim WBO bantamweight title
43	Win	41–2	Roberto Bonilla	UD	10 (10)	2009-03-28	Coliseo Rubén Rodríguez, Bayamon, Puerto Rico	
42	Win	40–2	Ricardo Vargas	TKO	1 (10)	2008-12-13	José Miguel Agrelot Coliseum, Hato Rey, Puerto Rico	
41	Win	39–2	Heriberto Ruiz	UD	12 (12)	2008-08-30	Coliseo Rubén Rodríguez, Bayamon, Puerto Rico	Won vacant WBO Inter-Continental bantamweight title
40	Win	38–2	Jose Garcia Bernal	TKO	3 (10)	2008-05-23	Coliseo Antonio R. Barcelo, Toa Baja, Puerto Rico	
39	Win	37–2	Carlos Valcarcel	KO	6 (10)	2008-04-05	Roberto Clemente Coliseum, San Juan, Puerto Rico	
38	Win	36–2	Felipe Almanza	UD	8 (8)	2008-02-08	Miccosukee Resort & Gaming, Miami, Florida, U.S.	
37	Loss	35–2	Martín Castillo	UD	12 (12)	2005-03-19	MGM Grand Garden Arena, Paradise, Nevada, U.S.	For WBA super flyweight title
36	Win	35–1	Juan Alfonso Keb Baas	UD	12 (12)	2005-01-29	Coliseo Rubén Rodríguez, Bayamon, Puerto Rico	Retained NABO super flyweight title
35	Win	34–1	Jesús Rojas	UD	12 (12)	2004-03-20	Mario Morales Coliseum, Guaynabo, Puerto Rico	Won vacant NABO super flyweight title
34	Loss	33–1	Lorenzo Parra	UD	12 (12)	2003-12-06	Coliseo Rubén Rodríguez, Bayamon, Puerto Rico	Lost WBA flyweight title
33	Win	33–0	Isidro García	UD	12 (12)	2003-06-28	Coliseo Rubén Rodríguez, Bayamon, Puerto Rico	Retained WBA flyweight title
32	Win	32–0	Denkaosan Kaovichit	TKO	11 (12)	2002-10-12	Arrowhead Pond, Anaheim, California	Retained WBA flyweight title
31	Win	31–0	Alex Baba	UD	10 (10)	2002-01-11	Coliseo Héctor Solá Bezares, Caguas, Puerto Rico	
30	Win	30–0	Jose de Jesus Lopez	RTD	8 (12)	2001-06-08	Ho-Chunk Casino, Baraboo, Wisconsin, U.S.	Retained WBA flyweight title
29	Win	29–0	Gilberto Keb Baas	UD	12 (12)	2000-12-15	Alliant Energy Center, Madison, Wisconsin, U.S.	Retained WBA flyweight title
28	Win	28–0	Alberto Ontiveros	UD	12 (12)	2000-10-07	MGM Grand Garden Arena, Paradise, Nevada, U.S.	Retained WBA flyweight title
27	Win	27–0	Sornpichai Kratingdaenggym	UD	12 (12)	2000-08-05	Alliant Energy Center, Madison, Wisconsin, U.S.	Won WBA flyweight title
26	Win	26–0	Alberto Ontiveros	UD	12 (12)	2000-06-03	DeJope Bingo & Entertainment, Madison, Wisconsin, U.S.	Retained IBA super flyweight title
25	Win	25–0	Tomás Rivera	UD	8 (8)	2000-02-12	Bank of America Center, Boise, Idaho, U.S.	
24	Win	24–0	Oscar Arciniega	UD	8 (8)	1999-12-04	Equestrian Center, El Paso, Texas, U.S.	
23	Win	23–0	Miguel Ángel Granados	UD	12 (12)	1999-09-18	Mandalay Bay Resort & Casino, Las Vegas, Nevada, U.S.	Retained IBA super flyweight title
22	Win	22–0	Francisco Espitia	KO	1 (12)	1999-08-06	State Fairgrounds, Columbus, Ohio, U.S.	Retained IBA super flyweight title
21	Win	21–0	Lorenzo Trejo	KO	4 (8)	1999-06-12	Fantasy Springs Resort Casino, Indio, California, U.S.	
20	Win	20–0	Jose Rafael Sosa	UD	8 (8)	1999-04-24	Tingley Coliseum, Albuquerque, New Mexico, U.S.	
19	Win	19–0	Ysaias Zamudio	TKO	7 (10)	1999-02-17	Van Andel Arena, Grand Rapids, Michigan, U.S.	
18	Win	18–0	Víctor Burgos	UD	12 (12)	1998-10-17	Casa Blanca Hotel, Mesquite, Nevada, U.S.	Won vacant IBA super flyweight title
17	Win	17–0	Rodolfo Blanco	TKO	6 (6)	1998-09-25	Foxwoods Resort Casino, Ledyard, Connecticut, U.S.	
16	Win	16–0	Julio Cesar Bazan	TKO	1 (6)	1998-08-06	Grand Casino Avoyelles, Marksville, Louisiana, U.S.	
15	Win	15–0	Erdenotsogtyn Tsogtjargal	UD	8 (8)	1998-06-13	Trump Taj Mahal, Atlantic City, New Jersey, U.S.	
14	Win	14–0	Orlando Malone	TKO	8 (8)	1998-05-09	Wisconsin Field House, Madison, Wisconsin, U.S.	
13	Win	13–0	Miguel Juarez	RTD	1 (8)	1998-03-09	Moscone Center, San Francisco, California, U.S.	
12	Win	12–0	Willie Thomas	TKO	5 (8)	1998-01-15	Wisconsin Field House, Madison, Wisconsin, U.S.	
11	Win	11–0	Manuel Sarabia	KO	1 (8)	1997-11-15	Spotlight 29 Casino, Coachella, California, U.S.	
10	Win	10–0	Carlos Francis Hernandez	UD	8 (8)	1997-09-10	Aladdin, Las Vegas, Nevada, U.S.	
9	Win	9–0	Mauro Diaz	TKO	2 (6)	1997-07-12	Grand Casino, Biloxi, Mississippi, U.S.	
8	Win	8–0	Armando Diaz	UD	4 (4)	Jun 14, 1997	Alamodome, San Antonio, Texas, U.S.	
7	Win	7–0	Jesus Lopez	UD	4 (4)	1997-04-12	Thomas & Mack Center, Paradise, Nevada, U.S.	
6	Win	6–0	Jesus Jimenez Ruiz	TKO	2 (6)	1997-04-04	The Orleans, Las Vegas, Nevada, U.S.	
5	Win	5–0	Esteban Ayala	TKO	2 (6)	1997-03-08	Convention Center, Albuquerque, New Mexico, U.S.	
4	Win	4–0	David Chamendis	KO	1 (?)	1997-02-12	Hulu Theater, New York City, New York, U.S.	
3	Win	3–0	Ruben Romero	KO	1 (4)	1997-01-11	Tropicana, Las Vegas, Nevada, U.S.	
2	Win	2–0	Joseph Salazar	TKO	1 (4)	1996-11-30	Tingley Coliseum, Albuquerque, New Mexico, U.S.	
1	Win	1–0	Jose Luis Aguilar	KO	3 (4)	1996-10-11	Texas Station, Las Vegas, Nevada, U.S.	

== Outside the ring ==
Shortly after the loss to Castillo, Morel was convicted of sexual assault of a drunken 15-year-old girl and was sent to prison. In July 2007, Morel was granted an early release within 30 days of August 1, 2007 to allow him to serve the remainder of his sentence on extended supervision.

== See also ==
- Boxing in Puerto Rico
- List of Puerto Rican boxing world champions
- List of world flyweight boxing champions

Sporting positions
Amateur boxing titles
Previous: Floyd Mayweather Jr.	U.S. Golden Gloves light flyweight champion 1994	Next: Juaquin Gallardo
Regional boxing titles
Vacant Title last held by José Navarro	NABO super flyweight champion March 20, 2004 – 2005; Vacated	Vacant Title next held by Kahren Harutyunyan
Vacant Title last held by Lante Addy	WBO Inter-Continental bantamweight champion August 30, 2008 – 2008; Vacated	Vacant Title next held by Sakhib Usarov
Minor World boxing titles
New title	IBA super flyweight champion October 17, 1998 – 2000; Vacated	Vacant Title next held by Mauricio Pastrana
Major World boxing titles
Preceded by Sornpichai Kratingdaenggym	WBA flyweight champion August 5, 2000 – December 6, 2003	Succeeded by Lorenzo Parra
Vacant Title last held by Fernando Montiel	WBO bantamweight champion Interim title February 13, 2010 – 2011; Vacated	Vacant Title next held by Alejandro Hernández
