= Sornpichai Kratingdaenggym =

Thai boxer

- Born: Nikhom Chuboon; May 1, 1974 (age 52); Lampang, Thailand
- Other names: Sornpichai Sor.Kuepong (ศรพิชัย ศ.เกื้อพงษ์)
- Nickname: Matjurat mueang nuea (มัจจุราชเมืองเหนือ) "Northern Death"; Flyweight Hope
- Height: 1.60 m (5 ft 3 in)
- Weight: 51 kg (112 lb; 8 st 0 lb)
- Division: Flyweight; Super-flyweight
- Fighting out of: Bangkok, Thailand

Professional boxing record
- Total: 35
- Wins: 30
- By knockout: 19
- Losses: 4
- Draws: 1
- No contests: 0

Other information
- Boxing record from BoxRec

Nikhom Chuboon, also known as Sornpichai Kratingdaenggym (Thai: ศรพิชัย กระทิงแดงยิม) or Sornpichai Pitsanurachan (Thai: ศรพิชัย พิษณุราชันย์), is a Thai former professional boxer who competed from 1995 to 2001 and held the WBA flyweight title from 1999 to 2000.

== Biography and career ==
Born in Lampang and raised in Kamphaeng Phet in northern Thailand. He started his combat sports career with Muay Thai before moving on to professional boxing.

In early 1996, he won the WBU flyweight title came in a twelve-round win over Angel Almena in Chiang Rai. He defended the title five times before being stripped in 1997. In the first defense he traveled to Italy to face the Luigi Castiglione at Town Square, San Mango d'Aquino, on 8 August 1996. Sornpichai won via unanimous decision. He also defeated Daniel Ward in Loei the same year.

In 1998, he moved up in weight to the super flyweight division and won the PABA title. He defended it four times before returning to flyweight.

On September 3, 1999 he challenged for the WBA flyweight title against reigning champion Leo Gámez in Mukdahan. Sornpichai defeated Gámez via eighth-round knockout to capture the WBA title, making him the fourth Thai WBA flyweight world champion after Pone Kingpetch, Chartchai Chionoi, and Saen Sor Ploenchit.

He lost the title in his second defense against Eric Morel at the Alliant Energy Center, Madison, Wisconsin on 5 August 2000.

== Retirement ==
Sornpichai retired after losing ninth-round knockout to a Japanese Jun Toriumi in early 2004 at Korakuen Hall, Tokyo, Japan. He then traveled as a trainer to certain countries such as China and Vietnam, but then returned to Thailand because of eye injuries. This was a result of his boxing since he was just 10 years old.

He currently lives with his only daughter born to an ex-wife who left him.

== Muay Thai record ==
Muay Thai Record
Date	Result	Opponent	Event	Location	Method	Round	Time
1995-06-10	Loss	(Thailand) Dao-Udon Sor.Suchart	Muay Thai Nai Khanom Tom, Lumpinee Stadium - Shark Attack Tournament, Final	Lampang, Thailand	Decision	5	3:00
1995-05-06	Win	(Thailand) Sakpaitoon Dejarat	Muay Thai Nai Khanom Tom, Lumpinee Stadium - Shark Attack Tournament, Semifinals	Bangkok, Thailand	Decision	5	3:00
1995-	Win	(Thailand) Kongka Nor.Nakpathom	Lumpinee Stadium	Bangkok, Thailand	KO	2	
1995-02-13	Win	(Thailand) Prakayfai Kor.Bangkruai	Rajadamnern Stadium	Bangkok, Thailand	KO	2	
1994-12-18	Win	(Thailand) Narongnoi Kiatsarika	Rajadamnern Stadium	Bangkok, Thailand	KO (Left hook)	3	
1994-12-01	Win	(Thailand) Singngern Lurkangsi	Rajadamnern Stadium	Bangkok, Thailand	Decision	5	3:00
1994-05-09	Win	(Thailand) Charoenthat Kiattibanchong	Rajadamnern Stadium	Bangkok, Thailand	TKO	4	
1993-11-04	Loss	(Thailand) Fighta Palan Group	Rajadamnern Stadium	Bangkok, Thailand	Decision	5	3:00
1993-03-10	Loss	(Thailand) Khwanjai Charoenmuang	Rajadamnern Stadium	Bangkok, Thailand	KO	2	
Legend: Win Loss Draw/No contest Notes

== See more ==
- List of world flyweight boxing champions
