= Denkaosan Kaovichit =

Thai boxer (born 1976)

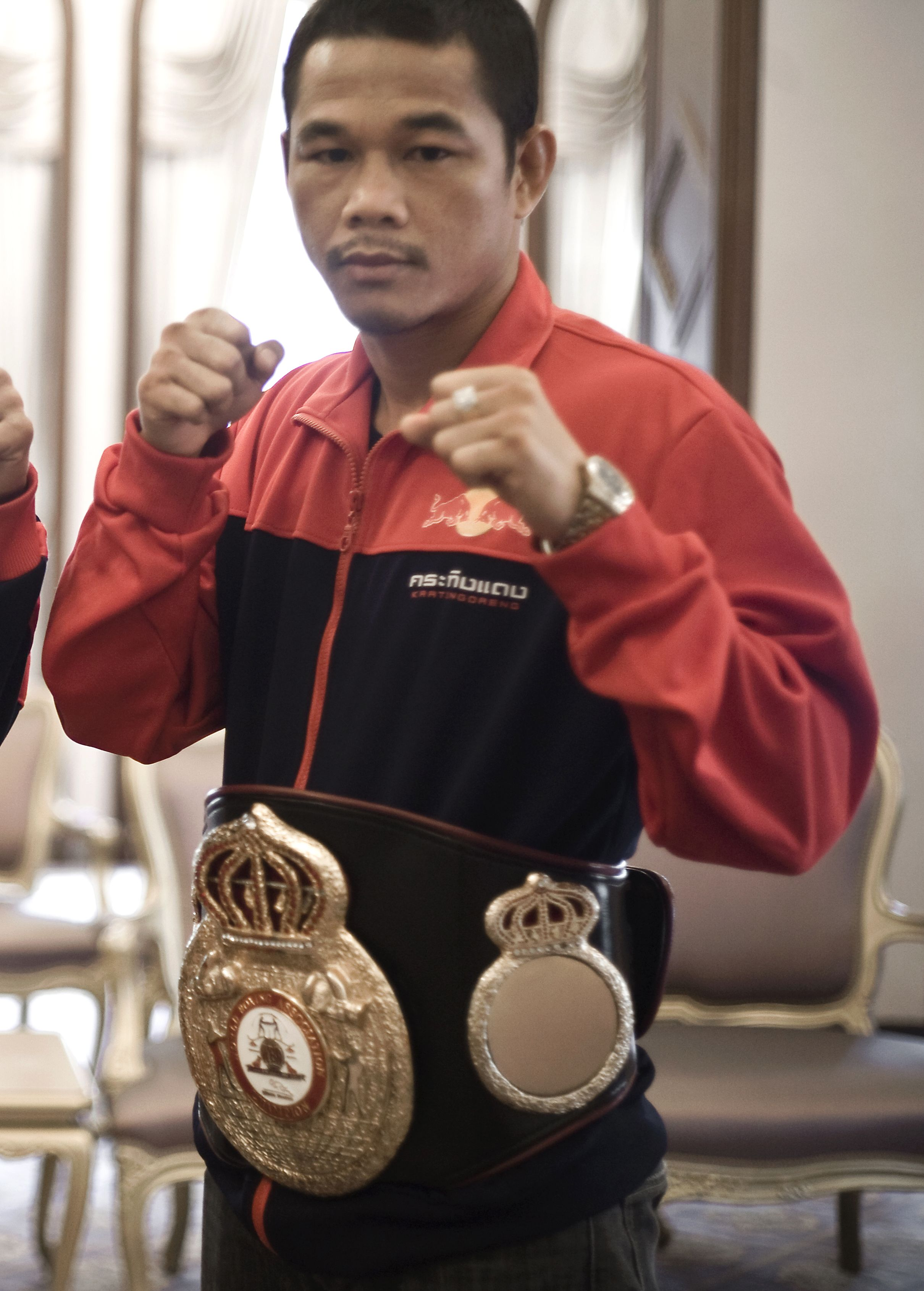
- Born: Sutep Wangmuk (สุเทพ หวังมุก); August 23, 1976 (age 50); Songkhla, Thailand
- Native name: เด่นเก้าแสน เก้าวิชิต
- Height: 1.61 m (5 ft 3 in)
- Weight: 51 kg (112 lb; 8.0 st)
- Reach: 168 cm (66.1 in)
- Stance: Orthodox
- Fighting out of: Ko Samui, Thailand
- Team: Galaxy Promotion
- Years active: 1996–2016

Professional boxing record
- Total: 71
- Wins: 63
- By knockout: 26
- Losses: 7
- By knockout: 4
- Draws: 1

Other information
- Boxing record from BoxRec

Denkaosan Kaovichit a.k.a. Denkaosan Redbull Gym. a.k.a. Denkaosan Singwangcha (Thai: เด่นเก้าแสน เก้าวิชิต, เด่นเก้าแสน กระทิงแดงยิม, เด่นเก้าแสน สิงห์วังชา; born, August 23, 1976) is a professional boxer from Thailand, he is a former WBA Flyweight World champion.

== Biography and career ==
Kaovichit began fighting professionally in 1996. After achieving an undefeated streak of 21 victories, he challenged Eric Morel for WBA flyweight championship on October 12, 2002. But after being knocked down twice in the 11th round, the referee stopped the bout. This was his first-ever defeat.

After winning 20 consecutive matches, Kaovichit got another on the same title. This time, it was against Takefumi Sakata on November 4, 2007. The match, however, resulted in a draw.

Following 5 wins in a row, he got a third shot at the title. Kaovichit battled Sakata again on December 31, 2008 and exacted revenge. He won the championship by besting the Japanese fighter in just two rounds.

On his first defense of that title, which was held in his homeland, Kaovichit escaped with a narrow split decision against Hiroyuki Hisataka on May 26, 2009.

Kaovichit won his second title defense on October 6, 2009 by a majority decision over Daiki Kameda. Dankaosan lost his title in a rematch against Daiki Kameda on February 7, 2010 in Kobe, Japan.

Daenkaosan won the interim WBA Super flyweight championship on September 3, 2013, when he defeated Nobuo Nashiro by split decision. Denkaosan faced Kohei Kono for the regular version of the title on March 26, 2014. He lost the fight by 8th round knockout.

== Professional boxing record ==
71 fights	63 wins	7 losses
By knockout	26	6
By decision	37	1
Draws	1	

No.	Result	Record	Opponent	Type	Round, time	Date	Location	Notes
71	Loss	63–7–1	Kazuki Tanaka	TKO	2 (8), 1:53	3 Apr 2016	EDION Arena Osaka, Osaka, Japan	
70	Loss	63–6–1	TJ Doheny	TKO	5 (12), 2:18	3 Oct 2015	Alexandria Basketball Stadium, Perry Park, Australia	For PABA super bantamweight title
69	Loss	63–5–1	Ryo Matsumoto	KO	2 (8), 0:32	5 Sep 2014	Yoyogi #2 Gymnasium, Tokyo, Japan	
68	Win	63–4–1	Gaspar Ampolo	UD	6	4 Jul 2014	Provincial Stadium, Phichit, Thailand	
67	Loss	62–4–1	Kohei Kono	KO	8 (12), 0:50	26 Mar 2014	Korakuen Hall, Tokyo, Japan	For vacant WBA super flyweight title
66	Win	62–3–1	Nobuo Nashiro	SD	12	3 Sep 2013	Suranaree University of Technology, Nakhon Ratchasima, Thailand	Retained Interim WBA super flyweight title
65	Win	61–3–1	Ical Tobida	TKO	12 (12), 0:54	28 May 2013	Wat Phrasaeng, Surat Thani, Thailand	Retained PABA super flyweight title
64	Win	60–3–1	Eiji Tsutsumi	TKO	12 (12), 2:58	19 Mar 2013	Bangkok University, Thonburi Campus, Thailand	Retained PABA super flyweight title
63	Win	59–3–1	Galih Susanto	UD	12	4 Jan 2013	Bangkok University, Thonburi Campus, Thailand	Retained PABA super flyweight title
62	Win	58–3–1	Rodel Tejares	TKO	3 (12)	13 Nov 2012	Ayutthaya Park, Ayutthaya Thailand	Retained PABA super flyweight title
61	Win	57–3–1	Rodel Quilaton	UD	12	24 Jul 2012	Chiang Rai, Thailand	Retained PABA super flyweight title
60	Win	56–3–1	Rino Ukru	TKO	3 (12)	2 Apr 2012	Uttaradit, Thailand	Retained PABA (Super) super flyweight title
59	Win	55–3–1	Ronerex Dalut	UD	12	24 Jan 2012	Lop Buri Army Kindergaden, Lop Buri, Thailand	Retained PABA (Super) super flyweight title
58	Win	54–3–1	Edison Berwela	UD	12	17 Oct 2011	Bangkok University, Thonburi Campus, Bangkok, Thailand	Retained PABA (Super) super flyweight title
57	Win	53–3–1	Hendrik Barongsay	UD	12	21 Jun 2011	Bangkok University, Thonburi Campus, Bangkok, Thailand	Retained PABA (Super) super flyweight title
56	Win	52–3–1	Panca Silaban	KO	2 (12)	22 Mar 2011	Phayuha Khiri, Thailand	Retained (perhaps) PABA (Super) super flyweight title
55	Win	51–3–1	Yudi Arema	TKO	9 (12), 1:32	24 Jan 2011	Bangkantak, Samut Songkhram, Thailand	Won vacant (perhaps) Interim PABA super flyweight title
54	Loss	50–3–1	Luis Concepción	TKO	1 (12), 1:30	2 Oct 2010	Arena Roberto Durán, Panama City, Panama	For Interim WBA flyweight title
53	Win	50–2–1	Anis Ceunfin	UD	12	15 Jun 2010	Indochina Market, Phitsanulok, Thailand	Retained PABA (Super) flyweight title
52	Win	49–2–1	Rey Megrino	TD	10 (12)	19 Apr 2010	Chunchonbantakham School, Chiang Mai, Thailand	Won PABA flyweight tile
51	Loss	48–2–1	Daiki Kameda	UD	12	7 Feb 2010	World Memorial Hall, Kobe, Japan	Lost WBA flyweight title
50	Win	48–1–1	Daiki Kameda	MD	12	6 Oct 2009	Central Gym, Osaka, Japan	Retained WBA flyweight title
49	Win	47–1–1	Hiroyuki Kudaka	SD	12	26 May 2009	Central Stadium, Uttaradit, Thailand	Retained WBA flyweight title
48	Win	46–1–1	Takefumi Sakata	KO	2 (12), 2:55	31 Dec 2008	Sun Plaza Hall, Hiroshima, Japan	Won WBA flyweight title
47	Win	45–1–1	Dennis Juntillano	KO	2 (11)	17 Oct 2008	Rattanakosin Sompot Lad Krabang School, Bangkok, Thailand	
46	Win	44–1–1	Falazona Fidal	UD	6	29 Aug 2008	Morseng Building, Pathum Thani, Thailand	
45	Win	43–1–1	Jiang Tao	TKO	2 (6)	29 Apr 2008	Chiang Mai, Thailand	
44	Win	42–1–1	Rey Orais	KO	3 (12)	21 Mar 2008	Bangkok, Thailand	Won vacant ABCO flyweight title
43	Win	41–1–1	Ariel Austria	UD	6	19 Feb 2008	Hua Mark Indoor Stadium, Bangkok, Thailand	
42	Draw	40–1–1	Takefumi Sakata	SD	12	4 Nov 2007	Super Arena, Saitama, Japan	For WBA flyweight title
41	Win	40–1	Richie Mepranum	UD	12	14 Sep 2007	Potawattana Saenee School, Ratchaburi, Thailand	Retained PABA flyweight title
40	Win	39–1	Richard Olisa	UD	12	3 Jul 2007	Nonthaburi Waterside, Nonthaburi, Thailand	Retained PABA flyweight title
39	Win	38–1	Alwi Alhabsyi	TKO	2 (12)	2 May 2007	Thurakit Bandtit, Thailand	Retained PABA flyweight title
38	Win	37–1	Alfred Nagal	UD	12	9 Feb 2007	Tanamnon, Thailand	Retained PABA flyweight title
37	Win	36–1	Bryan Vicera	UD	12	22 Nov 2006	Bangprakong Wittayayon School, Bang Pakong, Thailand	Retained PABA flyweight title
36	Win	35–1	Nino Suelo	UD	12	31 Aug 2006	University of Thurakit Bandtit, Bangkok, Thailand	Retained PABA flyweight title
35	Win	34–1	Eugene Gonzales	KO	7 (12)	2 May 2006	Samut Sakhon, Thailand	Retained PABA flyweight title
34	Win	33–1	Jerry Pahayahay	UD	12	17 Jan 2006	Pattavikorn Market, Bangkok, Thailand	Retained PABA flyweight title
33	Win	32–1	Jun Eraham	UD	12	7 Oct 2005	Nakhon Pathom, Thailand	Retained PABA flyweight title
32	Win	31–1	Jun Pader	KO	1 (12), 1:38	1 Jul 2005	Muangmaisombatburi Market, Nonthaburi, Thailand	Retained PABA flyweight title
31	Win	30–1	Allan Ranada	UD	12	17 May 2005	Si Sa Ket, Thailand	Retained PABA flyweight title
30	Win	29–1	Randy Mangubat	TKO	7 (12)	17 Feb 2005	Meanburi Market, Bangkok, Thailand	Retained PABA flyweight title
29	Win	28–1	Edmund Nonong Develleres	UD	12	25 Nov 2004	Bangbuathong, Thailand	Retained PABA flyweight title
28	Win	27–1	Raymond Richard Malya	UD	12	26 Oct 2004	Central Stadium, Nakhon Phanom, Thailand	Retained PABA flyweight title
27	Win	26–1	Franklin Macalibo	KO	5 (12)	29 Jul 2004	Pakchong, Thailand	Retained (perhaps) PABA flyweight title
26	Win	25–1	Celso Danggod	UD	12	25 Feb 2004	Samut Skahon, Thailand	Retained Interim PABA flyweight title
25	Win	24–1	Roger Maldecir	KO	3 (12), 1:40	25 Nov 2003	Pathum Thani, Thailand	Won vacant (perhaps) Interim PABA flyweight title
24	Win	23–1	Noldi Manakane	KO	1 (?)	26 Sep 2003	Nonthaburi, Thailand	
23	Win	22–1	Jimmy Pinontoan	KO	3 (6)	26 Sep 2003	Nan, Thailand	
22	Win	21–1	Rodel Orais	UD	6	24 Mar 2003	Nonthaburi, Thailand	
21	Loss	20–1	Eric Morel	TKO	11 (12), 1:40	12 Oct 2002	Arrowhead Pond, Anaheim, California, U.S.	For WBA flyweight title
20	Win	20–0	Sukarno Banjao	UD	12	16 Apr 2002	Hua Hin, Thailand	Retained PABA flyweight title
19	Win	19–0	Hamadani Tomagola	KO	1 (12), 2:57	27 Feb 2002	Pathum Thani, Thailand	Retained PABA flyweight title
18	Win	18–0	Khadavi Fidal	KO	1 (?), 0:11	28 Nov 2001	Sa Kaeo, Thailand	
17	Win	17–0	Erwinsyah Eneck	UD	12	20 Sep 2001	Bangkok, Thailand	Retained PABA flyweight title
16	Win	16–0	Falazona Fidal	UD	12	25 May 2001	Pathum Thani, Thailand	Retained PABA flyweight title
15	Win	15–0	Sherwin Alferez	TD	10 (12)	16 Feb 2001	Bangkok, Thailand	Retained PABA flyweight title
14	Win	14–0	Johannes Lewarisa	KO	3 (12)	8 Sep 2000	Surat Thani, Thailand	Retained PABA flyweight title
13	Win	13–0	Sang Ik Yang	KO	7 (12)	16 Jun 2000	Chonburi, Thailand	Retained PABA flyweight title
12	Win	12–0	Javier Torres	UD	12	21 Apr 2000	Bangkok, Thailand	Retained PABA flyweight title
11	Win	11–0	Johnny Binge	KO	3 (12)	26 Feb 2000	Ko Samui, Thailand	Retained PABA flyweight title
10	Win	10–0	Issa Nasir	KO	4 (12)	18 Dec 1999	Surat Thani, Thailand	Retained PABA flyweight title
9	Win	9–0	Jang Bok Kim	UD	12	1 Oct 1999	Ranong, Thailand	Retained PABA flyweight title
8	Win	8–0	Ryan Puma	KO	3 (12)	2 Jul 1999	Bangkok, Thailand	Retained PABA flyweight title
7	Win	7–0	Dicky Franciscus	UD	12	2 Apr 1999	Chumphon, Thailand	Retained PABA flyweight title
6	Win	6–0	Yura Dima	UD	12	7 Jan 1999	Krabi, Thailand	Retained PABA flyweight title
5	Win	5–0	Danesh Shama	KO	1 (12)	29 May 1998	Thung Song, Thailand	Retained PABA flyweight title
4	Win	4–0	Yani Malhendo	SD	12	12 Dec 1997	Bangkapi School, Bangkok, Thailand	Retained PABA flyweight title
3	Win	3–0	Todd Makelim	SD	12	29 Aug 1997	Nonthaburi Stadium, Nonthaburi, Thailand	Retained PABA flyweight title
2	Win	2–0	Melvin Magramo	UD	12	20 Feb 1997	Saiyok Boxing Stadium, Kanchanaburi, Thailand	Retained PABA flyweight title
1	Win	1–0	Melvin Magramo	UD	12	28 Nov 1996	Samila Cape, Songkhla, Thailand	Won PABA flyweight title

== Muay Thai record ==
Muay Thai Record
Date	Result	Opponent	Event	Location	Method	Round	Time
1996-09-22	Win	(Thailand) Panphet Muangsurin		Ko Samui, Thailand	Decision	5	3:00
1995-12-19	Win	(Thailand) Mamai Sor.Sinchai	Lumpinee Stadium	Bangkok, Thailand	KO (Punches)	3	
1995-10-17	Win	(Thailand) Sakpaitoon Dejrat	Lumpinee Stadium	Bangkok, Thailand	Decision	5	3:00
1995-	NC	(Thailand) Hantalay Sor.Ploenchit	Lumpinee Stadium	Bangkok, Thailand	Hantalay dismissed	5	
1995-04-28	Loss	(Thailand) Samliam Singmanee	Onesongchai, Lumpinee Stadium	Bangkok, Thailand	Decision	5	3:00
1995-03-04	Loss	(Thailand) Hippy Singmanee	Lumpinee Stadium	Bangkok, Thailand	Decision	5	3:00
1995-02-24	Loss	(Thailand) Samliam Singmanee	Lumpinee Stadium	Bangkok, Thailand	Decision	5	3:00
1995-01-03	Loss	(Thailand) Samliam Singmanee	Lumpinee Stadium	Bangkok, Thailand	KO (Punches)	3	
1994-12-20	Loss	(Thailand) Hippy Singmanee	Lumpinee Stadium	Bangkok, Thailand	Decision	5	3:00
1994-06-10	Loss	(Thailand) Sod Looknongyangtoy	Lumpinee Stadium	Bangkok, Thailand	Decision	5	3:00
1993-09-25	Win	(Thailand) Karnchai Lukmahanak	Onesongchai, Lumpinee Stadium	Bangkok, Thailand	Decision	5	3:00
Legend: Win Loss Draw/No contest Notes

Achievements
Preceded by Takefumi Sakata	WBA Flyweight Champion; December 31, 2008 – February 7, 2010	Succeeded by Daiki Kameda
Vacant Title last held by Liborio Solís	WBA Super Flyweight Interim Champion; September 3, 2013 – March 26, 2014; Lost bid for full title	Vacant Title next held by David Sánchez
