= Thangthong Kiattaweesuk =

Thai boxer

Thangthong Kiettaweesuk
Personal information
- Nickname: Machine Gun
- Nationality: Thai
- Born: Thangthong Klongjan; August 13, 1977 Amphoe Bo Rai, Trat province, Thailand
- Died: May 26, 2012 (aged 33) Mueang Chanthaburi, Chanthaburi province, Thailand
- Weight: Bantamweight; Junior featherweight

Boxing career
- Stance: Southpaw

Boxing record
- Total fights: 24
- Wins: 24
- Win by KO: 17
- Losses: 0
- Draws: 0
- No contests: 0
Medal record
Representing Thailand
Men's amateur boxing
Southeast Asian Games
Silver medal – second place	2005 Manila	Bantamweight

Thangthong Klongjan (Thai: แท่งทอง คลองจันทร์; formerly: Tongdaeng Klongjan (ทองแดง คลองจันทร์); August 13, 1978 – May 26, 2012), known as Thangthong Kiettaweesuk (แท่งทอง เกียรติทวีสุข) is a late Thai professional boxer and amateur boxer who fought in Bantamweight and Super bantamweight division.

== Biography and career ==
=== Early life and Muay Thai ===
Thangthong (nicknamed: Daeng; แดง) was born on August 13, 1978, in a remote village in Tambon Nong Bon, Amphoe Bo Rai, Trat province. He started training in Muay Thai when he was around 9 years old, under the name "Daengnoi Detchawee". He first trained with Arak Phutrakul and later moved to the Sit Trat Trakarn camp of Somchai Pothisuwan He was able to develop his skills quickly and started to fight in Bangok under the ring name Chaichana Dechtawee (ชัยชนะ เดชทวี). He occupied the 105lb title at the renowned Lumpinee Boxing Stadium in 1995.

=== Boxing ===
After Muay Thai he turned to amateur boxing, as a member of the Thailand national team he won a silver medal in the 2005 SEA Games in Manila, Philippines.

Later in 2007 he turned to professional boxing and won the IBF Pan Pacific Bantamweight title in his seventh fight by defeating North Korean boxer, I-hon Kim on November 23, 2007, at Bangkok Bus Terminal (Morchit), Chatuchak District, Bangkok and defended it 10 times.

In 2010 he won the vacant WBC International Bantamweight by points over Kenyan boxer, Nick Otieno at Ratchaburi province and he defended his IBF title 15 time by defeating the points over Richard Samosir an Indonesian challenger on May 20, 2011, at Rayong province.

On May 18, 2012, he won the IBF Junior featherweight interim title over Macbute Sinyabi South Africans by KO in the 10th round at Nakhon Ratchasima province in the elimination fight for winner to challenge with the winner of the IBF-WBO unification fight between Nonito Donaire and Jeffrey Mathebula in order of IBF.

=== Death ===
On May 26, 2012, only eight days after his last fight, Thangthong was killed in a car accident with his family, including Theeraporn Klongjan his wife and twin nephews on Sukhumvit Road, Chanthaburi province.

== Titles and accomplishments ==
=== Muay Thai ===
- Lumpinee Stadium
  - 1995 Lumpinee Stadium Mini Flyweight (105 lbs) Champion

=== Boxing ===
- IBF Pan Pacific Bantamweight Champion (November 2007) (118 lbs)
- WBC International Bantamweight Champion (December 2010) (118 lbs)
- IBF Interim Junior Bantamweight Champion (May 2012) (122 lbs)

== Professional boxing record ==
24 fights	24 wins	0 losses
By knockout	17	0
By decision	7	0

No.	Result	Record	Opponent	Type	Round, time	Date	Location	Notes
24	Win	24–0	Macbute Sinyabi	TKO	10 (12), 2:32	18 May 2012	City Hall Ground, Nakhon Ratchasima, Thailand	IBF Super bantamweight title eliminator
23	Win	23–0	Francis Miyeyusho	KO	5 (12)	9 Sep 2011	Phitsanulok, Thailand	
22	Win	22–0	Richard Samosir	KO	3 (12), 2:41	20 May 2011	Mayong OTOP Center, Rayong, Thailand	Won the vacant IBF Pan Pacific Super bantamweight title
21	Win	21–0	Nick Otieno	UD	12	17 Dec 2010	Choenbung, Ratchaburi, Thailand	Won the vacant WBC International Bantamweight title
20	Win	20–0	Lande Olin	KO	4 (12), 0:46	17 Sep 2010	Mashare Corporation, Bangkok, Thailand	Retained the IBF Pan Pacific Bantamweight title
19	Win	19–0	Rafael Pangaribuan	KO	2 (12), 2:00	21 May 2010	Bangkok University, Thonburi Campus, Bangkok, Thailand	
18	Win	18–0	Jayvee Alipio	TKO	4 (12), 2:14	19 Mar 2010	Benjamatheputid School, Petchaburi, Thailand	Retained the IBF Pan Pacific Bantamweight title
17	Win	17–0	Rivo Rengkung	UD	10 (12), 1:09	16 Feb 2010	Taweethapisek School, Bangkok, Thailand	Retained the IBF Pan Pacific Bantamweight title
16	Win	16–0	Jonrae Verano	TKO	8 (10)	18 Dec 2009	Krirk University, Bangkok, Thailand	
15	Win	15–0	Anthony Esmedina	UD	12	26 Nov 2009	IKaraoke, Rachadapisek, Bangkok, Thailand	Retained the IBF Pan Pacific Bantamweight title
14	Win	14–0	Junhui Wang	KO	4 (12), 2:44	29 Oct 2009	Dantabtrako, Chom Bueng, Thailand	Retained the IBF Pan Pacific Bantamweight title
13	Win	13–0	Richard Olisa	UD	12	18 Sep 2009	Petchakasem University, Bangkok, Thailand	Retained the IBF Pan Pacific Bantamweight title
12	Win	12–0	Charles Delada	KO	(4) 12	17 Jul 2009	Chira Nakorn Stadium, Hat Yai, Thailand	Retained the IBF Pan Pacific Bantamweight title
11	Win	11–0	Irfan Ogah	TKO	3 (10)	15 May 2009	Bangkok University, Thonburi Campus, Bangkok, Thailand	
10	Win	10–0	Singo Kinaro	KO	2 (12), 2:63	20 Mar 2009	Benjamatheputid School, Petchaburi, Thailand	Retained the IBF Pan Pacific Bantamweight title
9	Win	9–0	Wido Paez	UD	12	20 Feb 2009	Ranod, Songkhla, Thailand	Retained the IBF Pan Pacific Bantamweight title
8	Win	8–0	Dexter Mendoza	KO	2 (10)	24 Oct 2008	School of Management, Petchkasem, Bangkok, Thailand	Retained the IBF Pan Pacific Bantamweight title
7	Win	7–0	Jonel Alibio	UD	12	25 Jul 2008	The Bazar Shopping Park, Bangkok, Thailand	Retained the IBF Pan Pacific Bantamweight title
6	Win	6–0	I hon Kim	UD	12	23 Nov 2007	Bangkok Northern Bus Terminal, Bangkok, Thailand	Won the vacant IBF Pan Pacific Bantamweight title
5	Win	5–0	Dondon Jimenea	KO	7 (8)	17 Aug 2007	Ayutthaya Park, Ayutthaya, Thailand	
4	Win	4–0	Hari Suharyadi	KO	2 (12)	22 Jun 2007	Taweethapisek School, Bangkok, Thailand	
3	Win	3–0	Bado Basir	KO	2 (6)	18 May 2007	Chinese Taipei Association, Samut Prakan, Thailand	
2	Win	2–0	Noldi Manakane	UD	8	23 Mar 2007	Petchkasem Management School, Nongkaem, Bangkok, Thailand	
1	Win	1–0	Ekachai Phothonggym	KO	2 (6)	21 Feb 2007	Chaophraya Park Hotel, Bangkok, Thailand	

== Muay Thai record ==
Kickboxing record
Date	Result	Opponent	Event	Location	Method	Round	Time
2000-12-16	Win	(Thailand) Khajornklai Por.Burapha	Nai Khanom Tom Muay Thai	Bangkok, Thailand	Decision	5	3:00
2000-10-07	Loss	(Thailand) Mitthai Sor.Sakulpan	Nai Khanom Tom, Lumpinee Stadium	Bangkok, Thailand	Decision	5	3:00
2000-09-02	Win	(Thailand) Sakpaitoon Dejrat	Lumpinee Stadium	Bangkok, Thailand	Decision	5	3:00
2000-03-25	Loss	(Thailand) Khotchasarn Singklongsi	Onesongchai, Lumpinee Stadium	Bangkok, Thailand	KO (High kick)	3	
2000-01-19	Win	(Thailand) Krairat Por.Paointhra	Lumpinee Stadium	Bangkok, Thailand	Decision	5	3:00
1999-12-13	Loss	(Thailand) Isorasak Jor.Rachadakorn	Kiatsingnoi, Rajadamnern Stadium	Bangkok, Thailand	KO (High kick)	5	2:49
1999-03-05	Loss	(Thailand) Pornpitak PhetUdomchai	Lumpinee Stadium	Bangkok, Thailand	Decision	5	3:00
1999-02-07	Win	(Thailand) Sod Looknongyangtoy	Muay Thai World Heritage	Chachoengsao, Thailand	KO (Punch)	4	
For the vacant IMTC World 122 lbs title.
1998-12-15	Loss	(Thailand) Saenchai Sor.Khamsing	Fairtex, Lumpinee Stadium	Bangkok, Thailand	KO (Right cross)	1	
1998-	Win	(Thailand) Pornpitak PhetUdomchai	Lumpinee Stadium	Bangkok, Thailand	TKO (Doctor stoppage)	3	
1998-	Win	(Thailand) Nungubon Sitlerchai	Lumpinee Stadium	Bangkok, Thailand	Decision	5	3:00
1998-05-12	Loss	(Thailand) Khotchasarn Singklongsi	Lumpinee Stadium	Bangkok, Thailand	Decision	5	3:00
1998-03-02	Win	(Thailand) Orono Majestic	Lumpinee Stadium	Bangkok, Thailand	Decision	5	3:00
1998-01-	Win	(Thailand) Thongchai Tor.Silachai	Lumpinee Stadium	Bangkok, Thailand	Decision	5	3:00
1997-12-16	Loss	(Thailand) Thongchai Tor.Silachai	Lumpinee Stadium	Bangkok, Thailand	Decision	5	3:00
1997-09-05	Loss	(Thailand) Sod Looknongyangtoy	Onesongchai, Lumpinee Stadium	Bangkok, Thailand	KO (Punches)	1	1:45
1997-08-16	Win	(Thailand) Charanthong RuamjaiPhuen	Onesongchai, Lumpinee Stadium	Bangkok, Thailand	TKO (Referee stoppage)	4	
1997-07-26	Loss	(Thailand) Namsaknoi Yudthagarngamtorn	Lumpinee Stadium	Bangkok, Thailand	Decision	5	3:00
1997-07-05	Win	(Thailand) Huatapan Sor.Sumalee	Onesongchai, Lumpinee Stadium	Bangkok, Thailand	Decision	5	3:00
1996-11-15	Win	(Thailand) Wittayalek Sor.Ratchadaphon	Fairtex, Lumpinee Stadium	Bangkok, Thailand	TKO (Doctor stoppage)	4	
1996-05-26	Loss	(Thailand) Sod Looknongyangtoy	Lumpinee Stadium	Bangkok, Thailand	Decision	5	3:00
1996-	Loss	(Thailand) Nuengsiam Fairtex	Lumpinee Stadium	Bangkok, Thailand	KO (Punches)	3	
1995-11-17	Loss	(Thailand) Nuengsiam Fairtex	Lumpinee Stadium	Bangkok, Thailand	Decision	5	3:00
1995-09-12	Loss	(Thailand) Nuengpichit Sityodtong	Kiatsingnoi, Rajadamnern Stadium	Bangkok, Thailand	Decision	5	3:00
1995-06-27	Win	(Thailand) Chanrit Thongpracha	Onesongchai, Lumpinee Stadium	Bangkok, Thailand	TKO	3	
1995-06-09	Loss	(Thailand) Kompayak Singmanee	Lumpinee Stadium	Bangkok, Thailand	Decision	5	3:00
1995-02-25	Win	(Thailand) Singhasamphan Kiatsingnoi	Lumpinee Stadium	Bangkok, Thailand	Decision	5	3:00
1994-12-17	Loss	(Thailand) Sod Looknongyangtoy	Lumpinee Stadium	Bangkok, Thailand	Decision	5	3:00
Loses the Lumpinee Stadium Mini Flyweight (105 lbs) title.
1994-10-	Loss	(Thailand) Kongka Nor.Nakpathom	Lumpinee Stadium	Bangkok, Thailand	Decision	5	3:00
Wins the Lumpinee Stadium Mini Flyweight (105 lbs) title.
1994-09-09		(Thailand) Chanarit Or.Bowin	Onesongchai, Lumpinee Stadium	Bangkok, Thailand			
1994-06-25	Win	(Thailand) Sakpaitoon Dejrat	Lumpinee Stadium	Bangkok, Thailand	Decision	5	3:00
1994-	Win	(Thailand) Hippy Singmanee	Lumpinee Stadium	Bangkok, Thailand	Decision	5	3:00
1993-12-09	Win	(Thailand) Krataithong Kiatmontep	Rajadamnern Stadium	Bangkok, Thailand	Decision	5	3:00
1993-09-25	Loss	(Thailand) Rungchana Por.Saewangwong	Lumpinee Stadium	Bangkok, Thailand	Decision	5	3:00
1993-	Win	(Thailand) Sod Looknongyangtoy	Lumpinee Stadium	Bangkok, Thailand	Decision	5	3:00
1993-06-25	Win	(Thailand) Samingnum Nongkeepahuyuth	Onesongchai, Lumpinee Stadium	Bangkok, Thailand	Decision	5	3:00
Legend: Win Loss Draw/No contest Notes
