= Kongka Nor.Nakpathom =

Thai former professional Muay Thai fighter

- Born: October 20, 1973 (age 52); Bo Rai, Trat, Thailand
- Native name: คงคา น.นาคปฐม
- Other names: Kongka Sor.Wanich
- Division: Mini Flyweight
- Style: Muay Thai (Muay Khao)
- Stance: Orthodox
- Team: Nor.Nakpathom Gym; Sor.Wanich Gym
- Years active: c. 1990s

Other information
- Occupation: Buddhist monk

Kongka Nor.Nakpathom or Kongka Sor.Wanich (Thai: คงคา น.นาคปฐม, คงคา ส.วานิช) is a Thai former professional Muay Thai fighter. He is a former Lumpinee Stadium and Rajadamnern Stadium champion at Mini Flyweight.

== Biography and career ==
Kongka was born in Bo Rai, Trat, eastern region.

During his career, he has faced several lightest weight class kickboxers such as Hippy Singmanee, Kompayak Singmanee, Samliam Singmanee, Siangsamphan Kiatsingnoi, Sakpaitoon Dejrat.

He was regarded as "the best of small fighters" of his era.

His insidious technique is to firmly caress his opponent, simultaneously attacking with knees.

After hanging up his gloves, he ordained as a monk. He studied the Dharma until he received the prepix "Maha" (Thai: มหา, "seriously").

== Titles & honours ==
- Lumpinee Stadium
  - 1994 Lumpinee Stadium Mini Flyweight (105 lbs) Champion
    - Two successful defenses
- Rajadamnern Stadium
  - Rajadamnern Stadium Mini Flyweight (105 lbs) Champion

== Fight record ==
Muay Thai Record
Date	Result	Opponent	Event	Location	Method	Round	Time
1995-10-21	Loss	(Thailand) Singsamphan Kiatsingnoi	Onesongchai, Lumpinee Stadium	Bangkok, Thailand	Decision	5	3:00
1995-09-12	Loss	(Thailand) Ekachai Or.Chaibadan	Lumpinee Stadium	Bangkok, Thailand	Decision	5	3:00
1995-	Loss	(Thailand) Sornpichai Phitsanurachan	Lumpinee Stadium	Bangkok, Thailand	KO	2	
1995-06-27	Win	(Thailand) Lebhiaw Chor.Ratchasupak.	Onesongchai, Lumpinee Stadium	Bangkok, Thailand	Decision	5	3:00
1995-01-03	Loss	(Thailand) Sakpaitoon Decharat	Onesongchcai, Lumpinee Stadium	Bangkok, Thailand	KO (Punches)	5	
1994-12-09	Loss	(Thailand) Saenkom Sakpanu	Onesongchcai, Lumpinee Stadium	Bangkok, Thailand	Decision	5	3:00
1994-10-	Loss	(Thailand) Chaichana Dechtawee	Lumpinee Stadium	Bangkok, Thailand	Decision	5	3:00
Loses the Lumpinee Stadium Mini Flyweight (105 lbs) title.
1994-09-09	Win	(Thailand) Samliam Singmanee	Onesongchai, Lumpinee Stadium	Bangkok, Thailand	Decision	5	3:00
Defends the Lumpinee Stadium Mini Flyweight (105 lbs) title.
1994-07-29	Loss	(Thailand) Singsamphan Kiatsingnoi	Onesongchai, Lumpinee Stadium	Bangkok, Thailand	Decision	5	3:00
Defends the Lumpinee Stadium Mini Flyweight (105 lbs) title.
1994-06-28	Win	(Thailand) Singhasamphan Kiatsingnoi	Onesongchai, Lumpinee Stadium	Bangkok, Thailand	Decision	5	3:00
Wins the Lumpinee Stadium Mini Flyweight (105 lbs) title.
1994-04-30	Win	(Thailand) Samliam Singmanee	Chatuchok, Lumpinee Stadium	Bangkok, Thailand	Decision	5	3:00
1994-	Win	(Thailand) Hippy Singmanee	Lumpinee Stadium	Bangkok, Thailand	Decision	5	3:00
1993-07-27	Win	(Thailand) Samliam Singmanee	Lumpinee Stadium	Bangkok, Thailand	Decision	5	3:00
1993-01-29	Loss	(Thailand) Singthong Kiatchatchai	Fairtex, Lumpinee Stadium	Bangkok, Thailand	Decision	5	3:00
Legend: Win Loss Draw/No contest Notes
