= Sod Looknongyangtoy =

Thai Muay Thai fighter and professional boxer

- Born: Anusorn Yotjan; June 3, 1977 (age 49); Si Thep district, Phetchabun province, Thailand
- Other names: Sod KokietGym; Sod Puninsee Gym (สด ปูนอินทรียิม); Sot Luknongyangtoi; Anusorn Yodchan
- Height: 165 cm (5 ft 5 in)
- Division: Mini Flyweight; Light Flyweight; Flyweight; Super Flyweight; Bantamweight; Super Bantamweight
- Style: Muay Thai; Boxing
- Stance: Southpaw
- Team: Or.Chaibadan/Luknongyangtoy
- Trainer: Manop Nobnom

Professional boxing record
- Total: 68
- Wins: 64
- By knockout: 28
- Losses: 3
- By knockout: 2
- Draws: 1
- No contests: 0

Other information
- Boxing record from BoxRec

Anusorn Yotjan, (Thai: อนุสรณ์ ยอดจันทร์; born June 3, 1977), known professionally as Sod Looknongyangtoy (Thai: สด ลูกหนองยางทอย), is a Thai former professional Muay Thai fighter. In Muay Thai he was a three weight Lumpinee Stadium champion and WMC world champion. In boxing he was a three time WBO world title challenger.

== Biography and career ==
=== Professional boxing career ===
On October 29, 2005, Sod faced Daniel Ponce de León for the vacant WBO super bantamweight title in Tucson, Arizona, USA. He lost the fight by unanimous decision.

Sod rematched Daniel Ponce de León on July 15, 2006, and lost by first round knockout.

Top Rank announced that Sod would challenge Guillermo Rigondeaux for his WBA (Super), WBO, and The Ring super bantamweight titles on 19 July 2014, at the Cotai Arena, Macao. Rigondeaux won the bout by knckout halfway through the first round. Sod hit the canvas due to a hard, accidental clash of heads, he was given time to recover, however when he got up, the two touched gloves as respect before Rigondeaux threw an ungentlemanly 'sucker punch' right hook to end the fight while they touched gloves with the other glove. This was the first professional fight for Rigondeaux outside of the United States and Sod entered the fight having not lost in over eight years.

=== Legal troubles ===
On July 13, 2016, Sod was arrested in the Lopburi province for possession of category 1 narcotics (methamphetamine).

== Titles and accomplishments ==
=== Muay Thai ===
- Lumpinee Stadium
  - 1995 Lumpinee Stadium Mini Flyweight (105 lbs) Champion
  - 1997 Lumpinee Stadium Super Flyweight (115 lbs) Champion
  - 1998 Lumpinee Stadium Bantamweight (118 lbs) Champion
- World Muaythai Council
  - 1996 WMC World Flyweight (112 lbs) Champion
- Rangsit Stadium
  - 1989 Rangsit Stadium 33 kg Champion

=== Amateur ===
- 1995 Seoul Box Cup 51 kg (silver)

=== Professional ===
- World Boxing Organization
  - 2001 WBO Asia Pacific super bantamweight Champion
    - Seven successful title defenses
  - 2006 WBO Asia Pacific super bantamweight Champion
    - Three successful title defenses
- World Boxing Council
  - 2011 WBC Asian Super Bantamweight Champion
    - Four successful title defenses

== Muay Thai record ==
Professional Muay Thai record
Date	Result	Opponent	Event	Location	Method	Round	Time
?	Loss	(Thailand) Thapnar Sitromsai	Onesongchai, Rajadamnern Stadium	Bangkok, Thailand	Decision	5	3:00
?	Loss	(Thailand) Kongpipop Petchyindee	Lumpinee Stadium	Bangkok, Thailand	KO (Right hook)	2	
2000-06-24	Loss	(Thailand) Ngathao Attharungroj	Lumpinee Stadium - Ford Ranger Tournament, Semifinal	Bangkok, Thailand	Decision	5	3:00
2000-05-27	Win	(Thailand) Sakphaitoon Decharat	Nai Khanom Tom, Lumpinee Stadium	Bangkok, Thailand	Decision	5	3:00
2000-02-01	Win	(Thailand) Buakaw Por.Pramuk	Lumpinee Stadium	Bangkok, Thailand	Decision	5	3:00
1999-	Win	(Thailand) Pornpitak PhetUdomchai	Lumpinee Stadium	Bangkok, Thailand	Decision	5	3:00
1999-09-04	Loss	(Thailand) Wanpichai Sor.Khamsing	Lumpinee Stadium	Bangkok, Thailand	Decision	5	3:00
1999-06-14	Win	(Thailand) Krairat Por.Paoin	Bangrachan, Rajadamnern Stadium	Bangkok, Thailand	Decision	5	3:00
1999-04-23	Loss	(Thailand) Khunpinit Kiattawan	Lumpinee Stadium	Bangkok, Thailand	Decision	5	3:00
1999-02-07	Loss	(Thailand) Chaichana Dechtawee	Muay Thai World Heritage	Chachoengsao, Thailand	KO (Punch)	4	
For the vacant IMTC World 122 lbs title.
1998-10-26	Loss	(Thailand) Saenchai Sor.Khamsing	Rajadamnern Stadium	Bangkok, Thailand	KO	1	
1998-08-28	Win	(Thailand) Densiam Lukprabat	Lumpinee Stadium	Bangkok, Thailand	Decision	5	3:00
Wins the Lumpinee Stadium Super Flyweight (118 lbs) title.
1998-05-26	Win	(Thailand) Nungubon Sitlerchai	Lumpinee Stadium	Bangkok, Thailand	Decision	5	3:00
1997-12-16	Loss	(Thailand) SakUbon Por.MuangUbon	Thahan Suea, Lumpinee Stadium	Bangkok, Thailand	KO (Elbow)	3	3:00
1997-09-05	Win	(Thailand) Chaichana Dechtawee	Lumpinee Stadium	Bangkok, Thailand	KO (Punches)	1	1:45
1997-07-29	Loss	(Thailand) Densiam Lukprabat	Lumpinee Stadium	Bangkok, Thailand	Decision	5	3:00
Loses the Lumpinee Stadium Super Flyweight (115 lbs) title.
1997-05-09	Win	(Thailand) Namsaknoi Yudthagarngamtorn	Lumpinee Stadium	Bangkok, Thailand	TKO (Doctor stoppage)	2	
1997-04-11	Win	(Thailand) Pornpitak PhetUdomchai	Onesongchai, Lumpinee Stadium	Bangkok, Thailand	Decision	5	3:00
Wins the vacant Lumpinee Stadium Super Flyweight (115 lbs) title.
1997-02-25	Loss	(Thailand) Kaolan Kaovichit	Onesongchai, Lumpinee Stadium	Bangkok, Thailand	Decision	5	3:00
1996-10-22	Loss	(Thailand) Kaolan Kaovichit	Onesongchai, Lumpinee Stadium	Bangkok, Thailand	Decision	5	3:00
1996-08-30	Loss	(Thailand) Thongchai Tor.Silachai	Lumpinee Stadium	Bangkok, Thailand	KO (Punch)	2	
1996-07-09	Draw	(Thailand) Thongchai Tor.Silachai	Onesongchai, Lumpinee Stadium	Bangkok, Thailand	KO (Punch)	2	
1996-05-26	Win	(Thailand) Chaichana Dechtawee	Lumpinee Stadium	Bangkok, Thailand	Decision	5	3:00
1996-04-16	Loss	(Thailand) Hantalay Sor.Ploenchit	Lumpinee Stadium	Bangkok, Thailand	KO (High kick)	1	1:15
1996-03-	Win	(Thailand) Tukatathong Por.Pongsawang	Lumpinee Stadium	Bangkok, Thailand	KO	2	
1996-03-05	Win	(Thailand) Sittichai Petchbangprang	Onesongchai, Lumpinee Stadium	Bangkok, Thailand	Decision	5	3:00
Wins the WMC World Flyweight (112 lbs) title.
1995-1996-	Loss	(Thailand) Sittichai Petchbangprang	Lumpinee Stadium	Bangkok, Thailand	KO	1	
1995-11-28	Win	(Thailand) Nuengpichit Sityodtong	Onesongchai, Lumpinee Stadium	Bangkok, Thailand	Decision	5	3:00
1995-10-31	Win	(Thailand) Saenkom Sakphanu	Onesongchai, Lumpinee Stadium	Bangkok, Thailand	Decision	5	3:00
1995-04-28	Win	(Thailand) Pairojnoi Sor.Siamchai	Onesongchai, Lumpinee Stadium	Bangkok, Thailand	Decision	5	3:00
1995-01-03	Win	(Thailand) Kompayak Singmanee	Onesongchai, Rajadamnern Stadium	Bangkok, Thailand	Decision	5	3:00
1994-12-17	Win	(Thailand) Chaichana Dechtawee	Lumpinee Stadium	Bangkok, Thailand	Decision	5	3:00
Wins the Lumpinee Stadium Mini Flyweight (105 lbs) title.
1994-08-26	Loss	(Thailand) Hippy Singmanee	Lumpinee Stadium	Bangkok, Thailand	Decision	5	3:00
1994-06-10	Win	(Thailand) Denkaosan Kaovichit	Lumpinee Stadium	Bangkok, Thailand	Decision	5	3:00
1994-05-14	Loss	(Thailand) Samliam Singmanee	Onesongchai, Lumpinee Stadium	Bangkok, Thailand	Decision	5	3:00
1994-	Loss	(Thailand) Hippy Singmanee	Lumpinee Stadium	Bangkok, Thailand	Decision	5	3:00
1993-12-17	Win	(Thailand) Sakpaitoon Decharat	Lumpinee Stadium	Bangkok, Thailand	Decision	5	3:00
1993-	Win	(Thailand) Maimai Sor.Sinchai	Lumpinee Stadium	Bangkok, Thailand	KO	3	
1993-	Win	(Thailand) Chatchai Kiattipaya	Lumpinee Stadium	Bangkok, Thailand	Decision	5	3:00
1993-	Win	(Thailand) Rittanun Sor.Rungsak		Chonburi province, Thailand	KO	1	
1993-	Win	(Thailand) Kaewfannoi Sor.Rachadakorn	Lumpinee Stadium	Bangkok, Thailand	KO	1	
1993-	Win	(Thailand) Thaweechai Saengmorakot	Lumpinee Stadium	Bangkok, Thailand	Decision	5	3:00
1993-	Loss	(Thailand) Chaichana Dechtawee	Lumpinee Stadium	Bangkok, Thailand	Decision	5	3:00
1993-	Win	(Thailand) Rambojiew Por.Chuanchuen	Lumpinee Stadium	Bangkok, Thailand	Decision	5	3:00
Legend: Win Loss Draw/No contest Notes

== Professional boxing record ==
68 fights	64 wins	3 losses
By knockout	28	2
By decision	36	1
Draws	1	

No.	Result	Record	Opponent	Type	Round, time	Date	Location	Notes
68	Win	64–3-1	Joaquim Mahe	PTS	6	31 Jan 2015	Pattaya Boxing World, Pattaya, Thailand	
67	Loss	63–3-1	Guillermo Rigondeaux	KO	1 (12), 1:44	19 Jul 2014	Cotai Arena, Macau, SAR	For the WBA (Super), WBO, and The Ring super bantamweight titles
66	Win	63–2-1	Bryan Hussay	PTS	6	10 Oct 2013	Ban Rai Temple, Nakhon Ratchasima, Thailand	
65	Win	62–2-1	Joel Kwong	PTS	6	11 Sep 2013	Sanambin Market Park, Tha Sae, Thailand	
64	Win	61–2-1	Randy Megrino	UD	12	8 Feb 2013	Amnuaysil Association, Prachachuen, Bangkok Thailand	
63	Win	60–2-1	Elmar Francisco	KO	3 (12), 1:29	26 Nov 2012	Nong Khai, Thailand	Retains the WBC Asian super bantamweight title
62	Win	59–2-1	GuoWei Lin	TKO	3 (12), 2:23	4 Oct 2012	Ban Rai Temple, Nakhon Ratchasima, Thailand	Retains the WBC Asian super bantamweight title
61	Win	58–2-1	Frans Yarangga	KO	1 (12), 0:56	31 July 2012	Lamphoon, Thailand	Retains the WBC Asian super bantamweight title
60	Win	57–2-1	Sahril Fabanyo	KO	3 (12), 0:19	4 May 2012	Bang Phli, Thailand	Retains the WBC Asian super bantamweight title
59	Win	56–2-1	Rivo Rengkung	KO	2 (6)	9 Mar 2012	Non Sung, Thailand	
58	Win	55–2-1	Zhandos Zhetpisbayev	KO	6 (12), 2:47	26 Dec 2011	Kaenpatana, Mae Taeng, Thailand	Wins the WBC Asian super bantamweight title
57	Win	54–2-1	Falazona Fidal	TKO	5 (12)	9 Nov 2011	North Eastern University, Khon Kaen, Thailand	
56	Win	53–2-1	Hendrik Barongsay	PTS	6	14 Oct 2011	Pattavikorn Market, Bangkok, Thailand	
55	Win	52–2-1	Skak Max	PTS	6	16 Sep 2011	Ban Mi Sports Center, Lop Buri, Thailand	
54	Win	51–2-1	James Mokoginta	KO	4 (12), 1:25	15 Aug 2011	San Sai Luang, Thailand	Retains the WBO Asia Pacific super bantamweight title
53	Win	50–2-1	Anshori Anhar Pitulay	TKO	3 (6)	28 June 2011	The Chaleena Hotel Bangkok, Bangkok, Thailand	
52	Win	49–2-1	Jilo Merlin	UD	12	8 April 2011	Saphan Hin, Phuket, Thailand	Retains the WBO Asia Pacific super bantamweight title
51	Win	48–2-1	JR Mendoza	UD	6	14 Jan 2011	Uthaikiri Resort, Uthai, Thailand	
50	Win	47–2-1	Rey Laspinas	UD	12	17 Oct 2010	Lawoe Technology School, Lop Buri, Thailand	Retains the WBO Asia Pacific super bantamweight title
49	Win	46–2-1	Jason Butar Butar	KO	5 (6)	29 July 2010	City Hall Ground, Nakhon Ratchasima, Thailand	
48	Win	45–2-1	Adones Aguelo	UD	12	14 May 2010	Lawoe Technology School, Lop Buri, Thailand	Retains the WBO Asia Pacific super bantamweight title
47	Win	44–2-1	Gedeon Amba	SD	6	26 Mar 2010	Karama Beach, Phuket, Thailand	
46	Win	43–2-1	Richard Olisa	TD	8 (12)	13 Nov 2009	Sathukarn Square, Hua Hin, Thailand	
45	Draw	42–2-1	Jack Asis	SD	12	11 Aug 2009	Muang Temple, Bangkae, Bangkok, Thailand	For the PABA super bantamweight title; Retains the WBO Asia Pacific super bantamweight title
44	Win	42–2	Junhui Wang	PTS	6	30 June 2009	Bueng Khong Long, Nong Khai, Thailand	
43	Win	41–2	Federico Catubay	UD	12	7 April 2009	Pathumwan Technology School, Bangkok, Thailand	Retains the WBO Asia Pacific super bantamweight title
42	Win	40–2	Anthony Esmedina	UD	6	28 Nov 2008	Amnat Charoen, Thailand	
41	Win	39–2	Dunryl Marcos	TKO	6 (12)	26 Sep 2008	Chumphonk, Thailand	Retains the WBO Asia Pacific super bantamweight title
40	Win	38–2	Shi Shi Long	KO	2 (6)	16 July 2008	Provincial Court Ground, Phatthalung, Thailand	
39	Win	37–2	Roger Monserto	KO	3 (6)	29 May 2008	Suanlum Night Bazar, Bangkok, Thailand	
38	Win	36–2	Yulio Moro	UD	12	18 Apr 2008	Ban Rai Town Hall, Uthai Thani, Thailand	Retains the WBO Asia Pacific super bantamweight title
37	Win	35–2	Carlos Lopez	TKO	2 (6)	14 Feb 2008	Minburi Market, Minburi, Thailand	
36	Win	34–2	Jaime Barcelona	UD	6	28 Dec 2007	Yasothorn, Thailand	
35	Win	33–2	Samson Elnino	TKO	2 (12)	22 Nov 2007	Sahatsakhan, Thailand	Retains the WBO Asia Pacific super bantamweight title
34	Win	32–2	Joan de Guia	KO	3 (6)	21 Sep 2007	Ban Kam-ahuan School, Mukdahan, Thailand	
33	Win	31–2	Edward Apaap	TKO	2 (12)	13 July 2007	Photharam, Thailand	Retains the WBO Asia Pacific super bantamweight title
32	Win	30–2	Almas Asanov	KO	4 (6)	11 May 2007	Yasothorn, Thailand	
31	Win	29–2	Edgar Gabejan	UD	6	31 Jan 2007	The Mall Shopping Center, Nonthaburi, Thailand	
30	Win	28–2	Jun Talape	UD	12	11 Nov 2006	Khao Lak Beach, Khao Lak, Thailand	Wins the vacant WBO Asia Pacific super bantamweight title
29	Loss	27–2	Daniel Ponce de León	KO	1 (12), 0:52	Jul 15, 2006	MGM Grand Garden Arena, Paradise, Nevada, U.S.	For the WBO super bantamweight title
28	Win	27–1	Edwin Gastador	UD	6	10 May 2006	Yasothorn, Thailand	
27	Win	26–1	Reman Salim	UD	12	31 Jan 2006	Tha Sae, Thailand	Wins the vacant WBO Asia Pacific super bantamweight title
26	Loss	25–1	Daniel Ponce de León	UD	12	Oct 29, 2005	Desert Diamond Casino, Tucson, Arizona, U.S.	For the vacant WBO super bantamweight title
25	Win	25-0	Boido Simanjuntak	KO	3 (6)	5 August 2005	Patong Beach, Patong, Thailand	
24	Win	24-0	Rodel Orais	TKO	3 (6)	3 June 2005	City Hall Ground, Maha Sarakham, Thailand	
23	Win	23-0	Eldered Romero	UD	6	19 Mar 2005	Suanlum Night Bazar, Bangkok, Thailand	
22	Win	22-0	Jun Magsipoc	TKO	6 (6)	12 Jan 2005	The Mall Shopping Center, Bangkok, Thailand	
21	Win	21-0	Rommy Wassar	KO	1 (6)	12 Jan 2005	Chaiyaphum, Thailand	
20	Win	20-0	Edmund Nonong Develleres	TKO	4 (6)	1 Sep 2004	Uthai Thani, Thailand	
19	Win	19-0	Raymond Richard Malya	UD	6	23 July 2004	Star Hotel, Rayong, Thailand	
18	Win	18-0	Edward Escriber	UD	6	19 May 2004	Bangkok, Thailand	
17	Win	17-0	Lymvy Antrik	UD	6	29 April 2004	Nong Bunmak, Thailand	
16	Win	16-0	Hussein Pazzi	UD	12	9 April 2004	Laemson Beach, Lang Suan, Thailand	Retains the WBO Asia Pacific super bantamweight title
15	Win	15-0	Pablo Boy Guevarra	UD	6	12 Mar 2004	Suphan Buri, Thailand	
14	Win	14-0	Mark Sales	UD	6	26 Dec 2003	Rayong, Thailand	
13	Win	13-0	Yuri Zharkov	UD	6	12 Sep 2003	Nong Khai, Thailand	
12	Win	12-0	Rommel Libradilla	UD	6	11 July 2003	Ratanathibeth, Nonthaburi, Thailand	
11	Win	11-0	Robert Osiobe	UD	6	11 April 2003	Lang Suan, Thailand	
10	Win	10-0	Thomas Mashaba	SD	12	11 Feb 2003	The Mall Shopping Center Taphra, Bangkok, Thailand	Retains the WBO Asia Pacific super bantamweight title
9	Win	9-0	Juventus Labombom	KO	4 (6)	25 Dec 2002	Pak Kret, Thailand	
8	Win	8-0	Danggur Pasaribu	KO	2 (12)	20 Sep 2002	The Mall Shopping Center Taphra, Bangkok, Thailand	Retains the WBO Asia Pacific super bantamweight title
7	Win	7-0	Jaime Barcelona	UD	12	7 Aug 2002	Dan Khun Thot, Thailand	Retains the WBO Asia Pacific super bantamweight title
6	Win	6-0	Andy Alagenio	UD	12	10 May 2002	Bangbuathong, Thailand	Retains the WBO Asia Pacific super bantamweight title
5	Win	5-0	Pablo Boy Guevarra	KO	2 (10)	7 Mar 2002	Bangbuathong, Thailand	Retains the WBO Asia Pacific super bantamweight title
4	Win	4-0	Pederito Laurente	UD	6	18 Jan 2002	Bangkok, Thailand	
3	Win	3-0	Ahmad Fandi	KO	6 (12)	21 Dec 2001	Nonthaburi, Thailand	Retains the WBO Asia Pacific super bantamweight title
2	Win	2-0	Michael Domingo	KO	8 (12)	3 Oct 2001	Dan Khun Thot, Thailand	Wins the WBO Asia Pacific super bantamweight title
1	Win	1-0	Tony Bernales	UD	10	31 Aug 2001	Nonthaburi, Thailand	
