= Namsaknoi Yudthagarngamtorn =

Thai former professional Muay Thai fighter

- Born: Muhammud Chaiyamart; October 13, 1979 (age 47); Phumriang, Chaiya, Surat Thani, Thailand
- Native name: มูฮัมหมัด ไชยมาตร
- Other names: Namsaknoi Wor.Walapon (นำศักดิ์น้อย ว.วลาพล)
- Nickname: King of Ram Muay (ราชันย์รำมวย); Hunter of a Hundred Elbows (พรานศอกร้อยเข็ม); Emperor
- Height: 175 cm (5 ft 9 in)
- Division: Light Flyweight; Flyweight; Featherweight; Super Featherweight; Lightweight; Light Middleweight
- Style: Muay Thai (Muay Femur)
- Stance: Orthodox
- Team: Kiatsingnoi Gym; Por.Pramuk Gym
- Years active: c. 1987–2010

Kickboxing record
- Total: 300
- Wins: 280
- By knockout: 86
- Losses: 15
- Draws: 5

Other information
- Boxing record from BoxRec

Muhammud Chaiyamart (Thai: มูฮัมหมัด ไชยมาตร; born October 13, 1979), known professionally as Namsaknoi Yudthagarngamtorn (Thai: นำศักดิ์น้อย ยุทธการกำธร), is a Thai former professional Muay Thai fighter. He is a former three-division Lumpinee Stadium champion, including defending the Lightweight title for six years before vacating, who was famous during the 1990s and 2000s. Since his retirement, he has worked as a trainer at various camps in different countries.

Namsaknoi was the camp senior of international Muay Thai superstar Buakaw when they both trained at Por Pramuk Camp. He spent 6 years in Singapore where he was an instructor to the Evolve Fight Team at Evolve Mixed Martial Arts, coaching world renowned MMA fighters such as Rafael Dos Anjos, Tarec Saffiedine, and Shinya Aoki.

== Biography ==
=== Early life ===
Namsaknoi was born Muhammud Chaiyamart in a small fishing village in the Southern Thailand province of Surat Thani. He was the youngest of 7 siblings, of whom an elder brother (Ges Chaiyamart) was also a Muay Thai fighter. Namsaknoi’s parents struggled to feed the family on a fisherman's meager income, which was one of the key motivations that drove the young Namsaknoi to Muay Thai when he was 8 years old to help support the family.

Namsaknoi adopted his fight name from his uncle, the original Namsak, who was a well-known fighter in the South. Proving to be a natural in the sport, he was fairly successful in his early fights in the Southern provinces. When he was 12, his trainer brought him to Bangkok where he would have access to higher quality training and fight opportunities.

=== Fighting in Bangkok ===
Namsaknoi spent his formative years in Kiatsingnoi Gym in Bangkok, alongside other golden-era champions such as Pairot, Wangchannoi, and Rattanachai. He climbed his way up steadily in the competitive fight scene of the country's capital, often matched against older and more experienced fighters and winning most of them.

When he was 17 years old, he was voted and won the highly prestigious Sportswriters Association of Thailand Fighter of the Year Award of 1996. He was one of the youngest fighters to win the accolade at that time. He won another, different Fighter of the Year Award 3 years later, given by the Sports Authority of Thailand. Later, he was acquired by Por Pramuk Camp in the outskirts of Bangkok, where he would remain until his retirement.

At Por Pramuk, his campmates include Chok Dee, Ponsawan, Kompayak, Nonthanon, and Buakaw, the golden boys that propelled the fame of Por Pramuk Camp internationally. Throughout his fight career, he fought some of the best Thai fighters of the golden era, including Neungpichit Sidyodtong, Saenchai PKSaenchaimuaythaigym, Samkor Kiatmontep, Attachai Fairtex, Kaolan Kaovichit, and Lamnammoon Sor Sumalee.

While his camp junior Buakaw would gain international fame from his participation in K1 Kickboxing, Namsaknoi mostly fought within Thailand, against the crème de la crème of the sport. He only fought a handful of fights outside of Thailand, in Japan (where he won a 2nd round TKO against the dangerous Satoshi Kobayashi), Korea, Macau, and Italy. Namsaknoi held the 135 lbs Lumpinee Stadium Belt for an astounding 6 years, until his retirement in 2006, ending his career with an impressive record of 280 wins, 15 losses, and 5 draws. For his long reign as the unbeatable champion, the Thai media gave him the nickname of “The Emperor”.

Namsaknoi is known for his graceful and elaborate Wai Kru Ram Muay, winning the award for the best Wai Kru Ram Muay of the year twice, in 2001 and 2006.

=== Dispute with Por Pramuk ===
Namsaknoi left Por Pramuk camp after a bitter dispute over the mismanagement of his fight winnings. The fallout that shocked the Muay Thai community forced Namsaknoi into retirement, as no gym was able to pay Por Pramuk's asking price to buy over Namsaknoi's contract. Destitute with no money nor belts to his name (he left most of his physical possessions in the camp when he walked out), Namsaknoi returned to his hometown of Chaiya in Surat Thani province, never to step into the rings of Bangkok again.

=== Transition to coaching ===
After retirement, Namsaknoi worked as a trainer in the tourist-heavy islands of Southern Thailand, spending a couple of years in Koh Phangan, Koh Samui, and Phuket. In 2010, he was approached by Chatri Sityodtong to join Evolve Mixed Martial Arts in Singapore, where he worked as a Muay Thai instructor for 6 years.

In early 2016, Namsaknoi left Evolve MMA as their Head Muay Thai Instructor, and returned to Koh Phangan, Thailand to set up his own Muay Thai gym, named Namsaknoi Muay Thai Club. The gym was opened on 14 October 2016. However in December 2017, Namsaknoi left his gym in Koh Phangan, despite growing interest and success of the gym.

In 2019 he was for one year a co-trainer in Germany, at the Fight Club in Ludwigsburg. He also was a coach for Rawai Muay thai in 2009-2010.

== Titles and accomplishments ==
=== Muay Thai ===
- Lumpinee Stadium
  - 1997 Lumpinee Stadium Flyweight (112 lbs) Champion
  - 1998 Ford Ranger Tournament Featherweight (126 lbs) Champion
  - 1999 Lumpinee Stadium Super Featherweight (130 lbs) Champion
  - 2000 Lumpinee Stadium Lightweight (135 lbs) Champion
    - Six successful defenses
- World Muaythai Council
  - 1995 WMC World Flyweight (112 lbs) Champion
- World Association of Kickboxing Organizations
  - 2010 WAKO Pro World Super Welterweight (154 lbs) Muay Thai Champion
- Regional Thailand
- Champion of South of Thailand 126 lbs
- Champion of South of Thailand 95 lbs

Awards

- 1996 Sports Writers Association of Thailand Fighter of the Year
- 1999 Sports Authority of Thailand Fighter of the Year
- 2001 Sports Writers Association of Thailand Fight of the Year (vs Kaolan Kaovichit)
- 2002 Sports Writers Association of Thailand Fight of the Year (vs Pajonsuk Lukprabat)
- Best Ram Muay of the Year 2001
- Best Ram Muay of the Year 2006

=== Boxing ===
- Pan Asian Boxing Association
  - 2002 interim PABA Boxing Champion 135 lbs

== Fight record ==
Professional Muay Thai record
280 wins (86 KOs), 15 losses, 5 draws
Date	Result	Opponent	Event	Location	Method	Round	Time
2010-12-04	Win	(Italy) Diego Calzolari	Janus Fight Night 2010	Padua, Italy	KO (Knee)	4	1:25
Wins W.A.K.O World Muay Thai Title (154 lbs).
2009-05-09	Loss	(Thailand) Berneung Topkingboxing	Royal Cup Of Kedah	Malaysia	Decision	5	3:00
2008-07-25	Loss	(Thailand) Berneung Topkingboxing	Bangla Stadium	Patong, Thailand	Decision	5	3:00
2005-10-21	Win	(Thailand) Nontachai Sit-O	Lumpinee Champion Krikkrai, Lumpinee Stadium	Bangkok, Thailand	Decision (Unanimous)	5	3:00
Defends the Lumpinee Stadium Lightweight (135 lbs) title.
2005-07-05	Win	(Thailand) Samranchai 96Peenung	Paianun, Lumpinee Stadium	Bangkok, Thailand	Decision (Unanimous)	5	3:00
Defends the Lumpinee Stadium Lightweight (135 lbs) title.
2005-06-04	Win	(South Korea) Jung Woong Moon	KOMA Gran Prix	Seoul, South Korea	Extension round Decision	4	3:00
2005-05-17	Loss	(Thailand) Munkong Kiatsomkuan	Por.Pramuk, Lumpinee Stadium	Bangkok, Thailand	Decision	5	3:00
2005-04-21	Loss	(Thailand) Munkong Kiatsomkuan	Wansongchai, Rajadamnern Stadium	Bangkok, Thailand	Decision	5	3:00
2004-11-09	Win	(Thailand) Munkong Kiatsomkuan	Por.Pramuk, Lumpinee Stadium	Bangkok, Thailand	Decision (Unanimous)	5	3:00
2004-10-13	Win	(South Korea) Chi Bin Lim	XENIA X-Fighter	Seoul, South Korea	KO (Knee)	4	2:15
2004-09-03	Win	(Thailand) Nontachai Sit-O	Por.Pramuk, Lumpinee Stadium	Bangkok, Thailand	Decision (Unanimous)	5	3:00
Defends the Lumpinee Stadium Lightweight (135 lbs) title.
2004-07-02	Loss	(Thailand) Naruepol Fairtex	Paianun, Lumpinee Stadium	Bangkok, Thailand	Decision	5	3:00
2003-11-18	Win	(Thailand) Noppadet Sengsiewmaigym	Por.Pramuk, Lumpinee Stadium	Bangkok, Thailand	Decision	5	3:00
Defends the Lumpinee Stadium Lightweight (135 lbs) title.
2003-	Win	(Thailand) Pajonsuk Lukprabat		Bangkok, Thailand	Decision	5	3:00
	Win	(Thailand) Rambojiew Por.Tubtim	Lumpinee Stadium	Bangkok, Thailand	Decision	5	3:00
2002-04-26	Win	(Thailand) Samkor Kiatmontep	Lumpinee Stadium	Bangkok, Thailand	Decision	5	3:00
Defends the Lumpinee Stadium Lightweight (135 lbs) title.
2002-03-17	Win	(Japan) Satoshi Kobayashi	A.J.K.F. "OVER the EDGE"	Tokyo, Japan	TKO (Referee Stoppage)	2	2:19
2002-02-01	Win	(Thailand) Pajonsuk Lukprabat		Pattaya, Thailand	Decision	5	3:00
2001-12-04	Win	(Thailand) Kaolan Kaovichit	Lumpinee Stadium	Bangkok, Thailand	Decision	5	3:00
2001-10-26	Win	(Thailand) Manja Kiatnipachai	Por.Pramuk, Lumpinee Stadium	Bangkok, Thailand	Decision (Unanimous)	5	3:00
2000-12-19	Win	(Thailand) Samkor Chor.Rathchatasupak	Onesongchai, Lumpinee Stadium	Bangkok, Thailand	Decision (Unanimous)	5	3:00
2000-12-02	Win	(Thailand) Saenchai Sor.Kingstar	Lumpinee Stadium	Bangkok, Thailand	Decision (Unanimous)	5	3:00
2000-11-04	Win	(Thailand) Khunsuk Sitporamet	Lumpinee Stadium	Bangkok, Thailand	Decision (Unanimous)	5	3:00
Defends the Lumpinee Stadium Lightweight (135 lbs) title.
2000-	Loss	(Thailand) Samkor Chor.Rathchatasupak	Lumpinee Stadium	Bangkok, Thailand	TKO	4	
2000-04-25	Win	(Thailand) Kaolan Kaovichit	Onesongchai, Lumpinee Stadium	Bangkok, Thailand	Decision (Unanimous)	5	3:00
Wins the Lumpinee Stadium Lightweight (135 lbs) title.
2000-02-29	Win	(Thailand) Khunsuk Phetsuphapan	Onesongchai, Lumpinee Stadium	Bangkok, Thailand	Decision (Unanimous)	5	3:00
2000-02-05	Draw	(Thailand) Attachai Por.Samranchai	Lumpinee Stadium	Bangkok, Thailand	Decision	5	3:00
For the vacant Lumpinee Stadium Super Featherweight (130 lbs) title. Namksanoi was stripped of the title after missing weight, only Attachai was eligible to win the title.
1999-12-07	Win	(Thailand) Lamnamoon Sor.Sumalee	Onesongchai, Lumpinee Stadium	Bangkok, Thailand	KO (Elbow)	3	
Wins the Lumpinee Stadium Super Featherweight (130 lbs) title.
1999-09-25	Win	(Thailand) Kochasarn Singklongsee	Lumpinee Stadium - Ford Ranger Tournament, Final	Bangkok, Thailand	Decision (Unanimous)	5	3:00
1999-09-21	Draw	(Thailand) Kochasarn Singklongsee	Lumpinee Stadium - Ford Ranger Tournament, Final	Bangkok, Thailand	Decision (Unanimous)	5	3:00
1999-07-03	Win	(Thailand) Thongthai Sitchomphob	Lumpinee Stadium - Ford Ranger Tournament, Semifinal	Bangkok, Thailand	Decision (Unanimous)	5	3:00
1999-05-15	Win	(Thailand) Baiphet Sor.Sakulpan	Lumpinee Stadium - Ford Ranger Tournament	Bangkok, Thailand	KO (High kick)	4	
1997-07-26	Win	(Thailand) Chaichana Dechtawee	Lumpinee Stadium	Bangkok, Thailand	Decision	5	3:00
1997-06-14	Loss	(Thailand) Kochasarn Singklongsee	Onesongchai, Lumpinee Stadium	Bangkok, Thailand	Decision (Unanimous)	5	3:00
1997-05-09	Loss	(Thailand) Sod Looknongyangtoy	Onesongchai, Lumpinee Stadium	Bangkok, Thailand	TKO (Doctor stoppage)	2	
1997-04-11	Win	(Thailand) Thongchai Tor.Silachai	Lumpinee Stadium	Bangkok, Thailand	Decision	5	3:00
1997-	Win	(Thailand) Densiam Lukprabat	Lumpinee Stadium	Bangkok, Thailand	Decision	5	3:00
1997-02-15	Win	(Thailand) Nuengpichit Sityodtong	Lumpinee Stadium	Bangkok, Thailand	Decision	5	3:00
Wins the Lumpinee Stadium Flyweight (112 lbs) title and the WMC World Flyweight title.
1996-12-	Win	(Thailand) Jomwo 13CoinsTower	Lumpinee Stadium	Bangkok, Thailand	Decision	5	3:00
1996-11-26	Win	(Thailand) Teelek Por Samranchai	Lumpinee Stadium	Bangkok, Thailand	Decision	5	3:00
1996-10-	Win	(Thailand) Lertchai Kiatbodin	Lumpinee Stadium	Bangkok, Thailand	Decision	5	3:00
1996-09-	Win	(Thailand) Lertchai Kiatbodin	Lumpinee Stadium	Bangkok, Thailand	Decision	5	3:00
1996-08-23	Loss	(Thailand) Rungrawee Sor.Ploenchit	Lumpinee Stadium	Bangkok, Thailand	Decision	5	3:00
For the Lumpinee Stadium Light Flyweight (108 lbs) title.
1996-08-	Win	(Thailand) Therdatailek Sarina	Lumpinee Stadium	Bangkok, Thailand	Decision	5	3:00
1996-07-27	Win	(Thailand) Therdatailek Sarina	Lumpinee Stadium	Bangkok, Thailand	Decision	5	3:00
1996-07-09	Draw	(Thailand) Therdatailek Sarina	Lumpinee Stadium	Bangkok, Thailand	Decision	5	3:00
1996-03-16	Draw	(Thailand) Kaewfanoi Sor.Rachada	Lumpinee Stadium	Bangkok, Thailand	Decision	5	3:00
1995-12-26	Win	(Thailand) Pornsawan Kiatpramuk	Onesongchai, Lumpinee Stadium	Bangkok, Thailand	TKO (Referee stoppage)	5	
1995-11-28	Win	(Thailand) Chansak Singklongsee	Onesongchai, Lumpinee Stadium	Bangkok, Thailand	Decision	5	3:00
1994-1995	Win	(Thailand) Nongpreeya	Lumpinee Stadium	Bangkok, Thailand	Decision	5	3:00
1994-1995	Win	(Thailand) Yodthongchai Sit Ma Aok	Lumpinee Stadium	Bangkok, Thailand	KO	4	
1994-1995	Win	(Thailand) Erawan Sitdenchai	Lumpinee Stadium	Bangkok, Thailand	Decision	5	3:00
1994-1995	Win	(Thailand) Phayaklek Sitjamee	Lumpinee Stadium	Bangkok, Thailand	Decision	5	3:00
1994-1995	Win	(Thailand) Pinphet Por.Weor	Lumpinee Stadium	Bangkok, Thailand	Decision	5	3:00
Legend: Win Loss Draw/No contest Notes
