= Daniel Ward (boxer) =

South African boxer

Personal information
- Nationality: South African
- Born: Daniel Ward; 3 June 1963 (age 63) South Africa
- Height: 6 ft 1 in (1.85 m)
- Weight: light fly/fly/super fly/bantamweight

Boxing career
- Stance: Orthodox

Boxing record
- Total fights: 38
- Wins: 26 (KO 18)
- Losses: 12 (KO 3)

Daniel Ward (born June 3, 1963) is a South African professional light fly/fly/super fly/bantamweight boxer of the 1980s, '90s and 2000s who won the Transvaal flyweight title, South African flyweight title, and Commonwealth flyweight title, and was a challenger for the South African super flyweight title against Nkosana Vaaltein, World Boxing Association (WBA) Inter-Continental flyweight title against Mzukisi Sikali, and World Boxing Union (WBU) flyweight title against Sornpichai Kratingdaenggym, his professional fighting weight varied from 106 lb (48 kg; 7 st 8 lb), i.e. light flyweight to 115 1/4 lb (52.3 kg; 8 st 3.3 lb), i.e. bantamweight. He was trained by Carlos Jacamo.
