= Jakkrit LG-Gym =

Thai boxer (born 1974)

Personal information
- Nickname: Tim (ติ๋ม)
- Nationality: Thai
- Born: Somsak Plapol (สมศักดิ์ พลาผล); 24 March 1974 (age 52) Ban Rat Khayan, Tambon Khao Khirit, Amphoe Phran Kratai, Kamphaeng Phet province, Thailand
- Weight: Junior flyweight

Boxing career
- Stance: Orthodox

Boxing record
- Total fights: 6
- Wins: 6
- Win by KO: 3

Jakkrit LG-Gym (Thai: จักรกริช แอลจียิม; born: March 24, 1974 in Kamphaeng Phet province, upper central Thailand) is a retired Thai professional boxer who fought in the Junior flyweight (108 lb) division in the mid-1990s.

== Biography ==
When Sairung Suwanasil lost the WBF Junior Flyweight title to Jesús "El Tigre" Chong, a fighter of Mexican-Chinese descent, on July 16, 1995, in Ayutthaya province, Jakkrit was surprisingly chosen to challenge for the title in a comeback match, despite having only four professional fights under his belt.

He caught the attention of the press at the announcement by showing up in his school uniform. At the time, he was still a high school student and a relatively unknown boxer. Prior to this, he had experience in Muay Thai, fighting under the name "Krataithong Kiatmontep." (กระต่ายทอง เกียรติมนต์เทพ) In late 1993, he faced Chaichana Dechthawee (who would later become known as Thangthong Kiattaweesuk) at Rajadamnern Stadium, where he lost by decision after five rounds.

The title fight took place on October 21, 1995, in Nong Khai province. Although he endured a punishing 12-round battle, he ultimately emerged victorious by points decision.

Two months later, he took part in a non-title bout against Filipino boxer Benjamin Escobia and narrowly won in what was described as a razor-thin decision. However, during a training session not long afterward, Jakkrit suddenly collapsed. He was rushed to the hospital, where doctors discovered that his brain had suffered serious trauma, likely from the earlier fight with Chong.

He underwent surgery and regained consciousness, but the injuries left him permanently disabled, forcing him into early retirement at the age of just 21. His record to 6-0 (3KOs).

Today, Jakkrit lives with his parents in his hometown in Kamphaeng Phet province. He is paralyzed and has lost his eyesight. The Sports Authority of Thailand provides him with monthly financial support of 5,000 baht.

== Muay Thai record ==
Kickboxing record
Date	Result	Opponent	Event	Location	Method	Round	Time
1995-03-13	Draw	(Thailand) Attachai Por.Samranchai	Rajadamnern Stadium	Bangkok, Thailand	Decision	5	3:00
1994-03-03	Win	(Thailand) Liamphet Naratrikul	Rajadamnern Stadium	Bangkok, Thailand	Decision	5	3:00
1994-01-24	Win	(Thailand) Chanarit Sor.Chalermchai	Yod Naomthong, Rajadamnern Stadium	Bangkok, Thailand	Decision	5	3:00
1993-12-09	Loss	(Thailand) Chaichana Dechtawee	Rajadamnern Stadium	Bangkok, Thailand	Decision	5	3:00
1993-10-08	Win	(Thailand) Baeber Pranchai	Lumpinee Stadium	Bangkok, Thailand	Decision	5	3:00
1993-07-13	Loss	(Thailand) Chinrat Pranchai	Lumpinee Stadium	Bangkok, Thailand	Decision	5	3:00
1993-03-23	Loss	(Thailand) Yodsayam Sor.Prantalay	Lumpinee Stadium	Bangkok, Thailand	Decision	5	3:00
1993-02-13	Win	(Thailand) Saengtawan Chor.Chaiphichit	Lumpinee Stadium	Bangkok, Thailand	Decision	5	3:00
Legend: Win Loss Draw/No contest Notes
