= Hippy Singmanee =

Thai former professional Muay Thai fighter

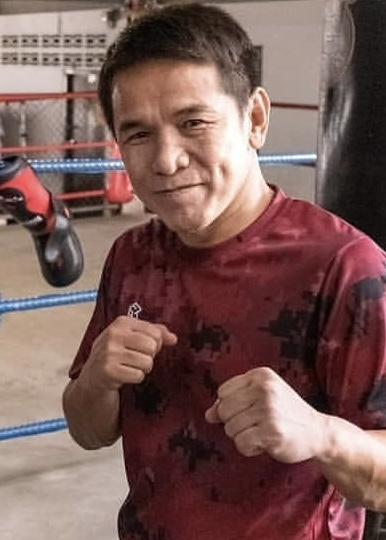
- Hippy in 2019
- Born: Pichet Chuthong; August 14, 1967 (age 59); Thung Song, Nakhon Si Thammarat, Thailand
- Native name: พิเชษฐ์ ชูทอง
- Other names: The Genius of the South (โคตรมวยเมืองใต้)
- Height: 160 cm (5 ft 3 in)
- Division: Mini Flyweight; Light Flyweight
- Style: Muay Thai (Muay Femur)
- Stance: Orthodox
- Team: Singmanee Gym
- Trainer: Kru Cherd Chuthong (father)
- Years active: c. 1978–1996

Kickboxing record
- Total: 223
- Wins: 161
- By knockout: 72
- Losses: 34
- Draws: 28

Other information
- Occupation: Muay Thai fighter (retired); Muay Thai trainer Fight promoter
- Children: 8 children including Hippynoi Singmanee
- Notable relatives: Kompayak Singmanee (younger brother); Thungsong Singmanee (older brother)

Pichet Chutong (Thai: พิเชษฐ์ ชูทอง; born August 14, 1967), known professionally as Hippy Singmanee (Thai: ฮิปปี้ สิงห์มณี), is a Thai former professional Muay Thai fighter. He is a former three-time Lumpinee Stadium champion across two weight classes who was famous in the 1980s and 1990s. Nicknamed "The Genius of the South", he is often regarded as one of the greatest and most talented fighters in the history of Muay Thai. He was especially praised for defeating larger opponents as well as his powerful, technical style.

== Biography & career ==
=== Early career ===
Hippy was born into a poor family in Thung Song, Nakhon Si Thammarat province on August 14, 1967. Initially, he did not compete in Muay Thai matches and only performed the Wai kru pre-fight ceremonies. He would let his hair grow and only cut it when it became too long, hence people started calling him "hippie." It would later become his ring name (although it is more often anglicized as "Hippy"). At 10-years-old he began his Muay Thai training in his father's camp, the famous Singmanee gym, alongside his brothers Thungsong and Kompayak. Hippy had his first fight several months later, knocking out his opponent in the 3rd round. As a child, Hippy would become a star fighter in the Muay Thai circuit of southern Thailand, winning multiple regional titles.

Before fighting in Bangkok, Hippy encountered various skilled opponents in popular southern fighting venues including the Rangsit and Samrong stadiums. At 15-years-old, Hippy made his Bangkok debut by fighting Chatchai Sasakul in 1982. As Hippy had a highly successful run beforehand, he believed that Sasakul was an easy matchup. Sasakul's movement in the ring made it difficult for Hippy to fight him, resulting a draw, although Hippy believed that Sasakul should have won. After Hippy adjusted his fighting style to beat him in the rematch, as well as beating "The Angel Twins" Boonlong and Boonlai Sor.Thanikul, the Thai audiences took notice to Hippy's skill. Around this time he would be picked up by the famous Onesongchai promotion.

=== Fighting style ===
Hippy was a powerful Muay Femur or rope-a-dope fighter who specialized in head kicks and elbows. While most Muay Femur fighters prefer to strike in order to control their opponents, Hippy also preferred to hurt his opponents as much as he could, utilizing an uncommon kicking style to generate more power and using elbows that often cut his opponent's faces. Hippy's favorite technique was head kicking which he used to earn KO victories or knockdowns. He employed the use of head movement to dodge punches as well as kicks.

Most of the non-powerful strikes Hippy threw served as intimidation so he could pressure forward, a tactic that Hippy also excelled at on top of being a Muay Femur. Near the end of a round, when fighters begin to tire, Hippy would take advantage of his opponent's exhaustion by using more head kicks to try to KO his opponent or resort to knee exchanges in clinches. Similar to Saenklai Sit Kru Od, while Hippy was a rope-a-dope fighter he would also brawl with his opponents as needed.

=== Elite career ===
Hippy earned the prestigious Lumpinee Stadium Mini Flyweight title (104 lbs, later changed to 105 lbs) in 1986 and successfully defended it against "The Top Master" Karuhat Sor.Supawan. In a 2023 interview, Hippy admitted that at around this time his fame and success grew to the point that he became overconfident with himself, stopped training frequently, and began underestimating his opponents. Because of this Hippy would suffer his first two KO losses back-to-back against Langsuan Panyuthaphum and Maewpa Sun Miskawan, causing him to be stripped of his 105 lbs title. Hippy reclaimed the title via elbow KO in the widely anticipated fight card featuring the boxing match between Khaosai Galaxy and Kongthoranee Payakaroon in 1988, perpetuating his popularity. He would be labeled by the Muay Siam magazine as "The South's Finest Fighter" and "The Genius of the South."

Hippy's prime lasted from 1987 to 1992. During this time he was considered the greatest fighter in the 105-108 lbs divisions, going so far as to win the Lumpinee Junior Flyweight title (108 lbs) against Karuhat Sor.Supawan and defending it against "The Ring Genius" Namkabuan Nongkeepahuyuth. For winning a fight against his most difficult opponent "The Death Mask" Veerapol Sahaprom, Hippy received 120,000 baht, the highest purse of his career which was also in the range of purses that were given to yodmuay (top fighters) at the time. In 1989, French-Algerian fighter Jaïd Seddak fought Hippy for the 53 kg Muay Thai World title. Although Hippy won, the two became friends afterward. Hippy's younger brother Kompayak Singmanee also became a notable stadium champion and the two became famous in Thailand as Muay Thai fighters.

Hippy admitted that he started declining as his physical condition began to worsen after his prime. Despite this, he was still able to secure victories against elite fighters Chaiyai Sitkaruhat and Sod Looknongyangtoy, among others. Hippy had his final Muay Thai fight against Laemsing Por.Nitiwat wherein he lost by decision. He was matched up against Burklerk Pinsinchai but they did not fight. Hippy's successful championship fights against Karuhat Sor.Supawan and Saeksan Sitjomthong are considered to be the best fights in his career. He would be remembered for being a highly successful fighter in his rise to fame before and during the golden era of Muay Thai as well for his ability to defeat larger opponents who often were from weight classes above his own. His admirers often pointed out his ability to combine power with technique in his fighting style.

=== Retirement and later years ===
After retirement Hippy became a trainer in the Bangkok where he now owns the Town in Town Muay Thai gym AKA the Por.Suwan gym. He also works as a Muay Thai promoter for the Cherchu Thai (เชิดชูไทย) organization in his native province of Nakhon Si Thammarat. He is married and has 8 children. One of his sons, Hippynoi Singmanee, is also a Muay Femur and is a trainer at the Gladiator Muay Thai gym in Australia. His ring name, Hippynoi, translates to "little Hippy."

Hippy cited Poot Lorlek, Vicharnnoi Porntawee, Samart Payakaroon, Kongthoranee Payakaroon, and Nokweed Davy as his top 5 greatest Muay Thai fighters. Hippy believes Chatchai Sasakul to be the most skilled fighter he has ever faced, additionally claiming him to be more skilled than Somrak Khamsing after taking into account their achievements in boxing.

== Titles & honours ==
- Lumpinee Stadium
  - 1986 Lumpinee Stadium Mini Flyweight (105 lbs) Champion
    - One successful title defense
  - 1988 Lumpinee Stadium Mini Flyweight (105 lbs) Champion
  - 1988 Lumpinee Stadium Light Flyweight (108 lbs) Champion
    - Two successful title defenses

== Fight record ==
Muay Thai Record
Date	Result	Opponent	Event	Location	Method	Round	Time
1996-09-06	Loss	(Thailand) Teelek Por.Samranchai	Lumpinee Stadium	Bangkok, Thailand	Decision	5	3:00
1995-	Win	(Thailand) Kaolan Kaovichit	Lumpinee Stadium	Bangkok, Thailand	KO	2	
1995-08-12	Win	(Thailand) Singnum Nongkeepahuyuth	Onesongchai, Lumpinee Stadium	Bangkok, Thailand	TKO (Low kicks)	2	
1995-	Loss	(Thailand) Saenchai Jirakriengkrai	Lumpinee Stadium	Bangkok, Thailand	Decision	5	3:00
1995-	Loss	(Thailand) Saenkeng Sor.Weerakul	Lumpinee Stadium	Bangkok, Thailand	Decision	5	3:00
1995-04-24	Win	(Thailand) Singsamphan Kiatsingnoi	Kiatsingnoi, Rajadamnern Stadium	Bangkok, Thailand	TKO (Low kicks)	2	1:24
1995-04-04	Win	(Thailand) Chanrit Tor.Sunan	Onesongchai, Lumpinee Stadium	Bangkok, Thailand	KO (Elbow)	5	
1995-03-04	Win	(Thailand) Denkaosan Kaovichit	Lumpinee Stadium	Bangkok, Thailand	Decision	5	3:00
1995-	Loss	(Thailand) Sakpaitoon Dejrat	Lumpinee Stadium	Bangkok, Thailand	Decision	5	3:00
1995-01-03	Win	(Thailand) Saenchai Jirakriengkrai	Onesongchai, Lumpinee Stadium	Bangkok, Thailand	TKO (Doctor stoppage)	2	
1994-12-20	Win	(Thailand) Denkaosan Kaovichit	Lumpinee Stadium	Bangkok, Thailand	Decision	5	3:00
1994-	Loss	(Thailand) Chaichana Dechtawee	Lumpinee Stadium	Bangkok, Thailand	Decision	5	3:00
1994-	Win	(Thailand) Saenkhom Sakphanu	Lumpinee Stadium	Bangkok, Thailand	Decision	5	3:00
1994-08-26	Win	(Thailand) Sod Looknongyangtoy	Onesongchai, Lumpinee Stadium	Bangkok, Thailand	Decision	5	3:00
1994-	Win	(Thailand) Sakpaitoon Dejrat	Lumpinee Stadium	Bangkok, Thailand	Decision	5	3:00
1994-	Win	(Thailand) Sod Looknongyangtoy	Lumpinee Stadium	Bangkok, Thailand	Decision	5	3:00
1994-	Loss	(Thailand) Saenkhom Sakphanu	Lumpinee Stadium	Bangkok, Thailand	Decision	5	3:00
1994-	Loss	(Thailand) Kongka Nor.Nakpathom	Lumpinee Stadium	Bangkok, Thailand	Decision	5	3:00
1994-01-28	Loss	(Thailand) Yodsiam Sor.Prantalay	Lumpinee Stadium	Bangkok, Thailand	Decision	5	3:00
1993-12-24	Loss	(Thailand) Sittichai Petchbangprang	Fairtex, Lumpinee Stadium	Bangkok, Thailand	Decision	5	3:00
1993-11-16	Loss	(Thailand) Sittichai Petchbangprang	Lumpinee Stadium	Bangkok, Thailand	Decision	5	3:00
1993-10-05	Win	(Thailand) Khumsap Phetmuangkon		Chaiyaphum, Thailand	Decision	5	3:00
1993-	Loss	(Thailand) Katanyu Sitesso	Lumpinee Stadium	Bangkok, Thailand	Decision	5	3:00
1993-	Win	(Thailand) Kongsak Sor Theptong		Chonburi, Thailand	Decision	5	3:00
1993-07-24	Loss	(Thailand) Netnarin Fairtex	Lumpinee Stadium	Bangkok, Thailand	Decision	5	3:00
1993-06-19	Loss	(Thailand) Singtong Kiatchatchai	Lumpinee Stadium	Bangkok, Thailand	Decision	5	3:00
1993-	Win	(Thailand) Phet Narumon	Lumpinee Stadium	Bangkok, Thailand	Decision	5	3:00
1993-05-15	Win	(Thailand) Chaiyai Sitkaruhat	Lumpinee Stadium	Bangkok, Thailand	Decision	5	3:00
1993-	Loss	(Thailand) Pleongphaya Sitkrurot		Nakhon Si Thammarat, Thailand	Decision	5	3:00
1993-	Loss	(Thailand) Phichitsak Saksaengmanee	Lumpinee Stadium	Bangkok, Thailand	Decision	5	3:00
1993-	Win	(Thailand) Chaiyai Sitkaruhat	Lumpinee Stadium	Bangkok, Thailand	Decision	5	3:00
1993-	Loss	(Thailand) Keng Lorsawat	Lumpinee Stadium	Bangkok, Thailand	Decision	5	3:00
1993-01-29	Loss	(Thailand) Saenkeng Sor.Weerakul	Fairtex, Lumpinee Stadium	Bangkok, Thailand	Decision	5	3:00
1992-10-17	Loss	(Thailand) Hansuk Prasathinpanomrung	Lumpinee Stadium	Bangkok, Thailand	Decision	5	3:00
1992-09-12	Loss	(Thailand) Wangthong Por.Pisichet	Lumpinee Stadium	Bangkok, Thailand	Decision	5	3:00
1992-07-26	Win	(Thailand) Kunasin Sor.Jongkit	Ruenrudee Stadium	Nakhon Si Thamnarat, Thailand	Decision	5	3:00
1992-06-20	Loss	(Thailand) Nongnarong Luksamrong	Lumpinee Stadium	Bangkok, Thailand	Decision	5	3:00
1992-04-04	Win	(Thailand) Kunasin Sor.Jongkit	Lumpinee Stadium	Bangkok, Thailand	Decision	5	3:00
1992-03-16	Loss	(Thailand) Singsamphan Kiatsingnoi	Kiatsingnoi, Rajadamnern Stadium	Bangkok, Thailand	Decision	5	3:00
1992-02-21	Loss	(Thailand) Nongnarong Luksamrong	Onesongchai, Lumpinee Stadium	Bangkok, Thailand	Decision	5	3:00
1992-01-04	Loss	(Thailand) Rattanachai Wor.Walapon	Lumpinee Stadium	Bangkok, Thailand	Decision	5	3:00
1991-08-06	Win	(Thailand) Methanoi Maliwan	Onesongchai, Lumpinee Stadium	Bangkok, Thailand	Decision	5	3:00
1991-05-31		(Thailand) Methanoi Maliwan	Lumpinee Stadium	Bangkok, Thailand			
1991-04-20	Loss	(Thailand) Sornsuknoi Sakwichian	Lumpinee Stadium	Bangkok, Thailand	Decision	5	3:00
1991-03-16	Win	(Thailand) Pornprasit Sitsiyontua	Lumpinee Stadium	Bangkok, Thailand	Decision	5	3:00
1991-02-23	Win	(Thailand) Pornprasit Sitsiyontua	Lumpinee Stadium	Bangkok, Thailand	Decision	5	3:00
1990-11-20	Loss	(Thailand) Khanuphet Johnnygym	Lumpinee Stadium	Bangkok, Thailand	KO (Right elbow)	1	
1990-11-02	Loss	(Thailand) Morakot Sor.Thamarangsri	Lumpinee Stadium	Bangkok, Thailand	Decision	5	3:00
1990-10-05	Loss	Thailand Pinsinchai	Lumpinee Stadium	Bangkok, Thailand	Decision	5	3:00
1990-09-28	Win	(Thailand) Mondam Kunsenser	Rajadamnern Stadium	Bangkok, Thailand	Decision	5	3:00
1990-08-20	Loss	(Thailand) Sornsuknoi Sakwichian	Rajadamnern Stadium	Bangkok, Thailand	Decision	5	3:00
1990-07-20	Win	(Thailand) Nungubon Sitlerchai	Lumpinee Stadium	Bangkok, Thailand	Decision	5	3:00
1990-06-08	Loss	(Thailand) Jaroensap Kiatbanchong	Lumpinee Stadium	Bangkok, Thailand	KO	2	
1990-05-15	Loss	(Thailand) Nungubon Sitlerchai	Onesongchai, Lumpinee Stadium	Bangkok, Thailand	Decision	5	3:00
1990-03-30	Loss	(Thailand) Tukatathong Por.Pongsawang	Onesongchai, Lumpinee Stadium	Bangkok, Thailand	Decision	5	3:00
Loses the Lumpinee Stadium Light Flyweight (108 lbs) title.
1990-02-24	Loss	(Thailand) Kruekchai Sor.Kettalingchan	Lumpinee Stadium	Bangkok, Thailand	Decision	5	3:00
1989-12-31	Win	(France) Jaid Seddak		Paris, France	Decision	5	3:00
Wins the Muay Thai World -53kg title.
1989-11-20	Loss	(Thailand) Chainoi Muangsurin	Kiatsingnoi, Rajadamnern Stadium	Bangkok, Thailand	Decision	5	3:00
1989-10-23	Loss	(Thailand) Namkabuan Nongkeepahuyuth		Koh Samui, Thailand	Decision	5	3:00
1989-10-06	Loss	(Thailand) Toto Por.Pongsawang	Yodmuaylok, Lumpinee Stadium	Bangkok, Thailand	Decision	5	3:00
1989-09-08	Win	(Thailand) Chainoi Muangsurin	Onesongchai + Chaomangkorn, Lumpinee Stadium	Bangkok, Thailand	Decision	5	3:00
Defends the Lumpinee Stadium Light Flyweight (108 lbs) title.
1989-07-11	Win	(Thailand) Namkabuan Nongkeepahuyuth	Onesongchai, Lumpinee Stadium	Bangkok, Thailand	TKO (Doctor stoppage)	3	
Defends the Lumpinee Stadium Light Flyweight (108 lbs) title.
1989-06-13	Loss	(Thailand) Panphet Muangsurin	Onesongchai, Lumpinee Stadium	Bangkok, Thailand	Decision	5	3:00
1989-04-20	Loss	(Thailand) Veeraphol Sahaprom	Daorungchucharoen, Rajadamnern Stadium	Bangkok, Thailand	Decision	5	3:00
1989-03-31	Loss	(Thailand) Odnoi Lukprabat		Pattani, Thailand	Decision	5	3:00
1989-03-21	Loss	(Thailand) Odnoi Lukprabat	Lumpinee Stadium	Bangkok, Thailand	Decision	5	3:00
1989-01-31	Loss	(Thailand) Karuhat Sor.Supawan	Lumpinee Stadium	Bangkok, Thailand	Decision	5	3:00
1988-11-04	Win	(Thailand) Veeraphol Sahaprom	Onesongchai, Lumpinee Stadium	Bangkok, Thailand	Decision	5	3:00
1988-10-11	Loss	(Thailand) Paruhatlek Sitchunthong	Onesongchai, Lumpinee Stadium	Bangkok, Thailand	Decision	5	3:00
1988-08-30	Win	(Thailand) Karuhat Sor.Supawan	Lumpinee Stadium	Bangkok, Thailand	Decision	5	3:00
Wins the vacant Lumpinee Stadium Light Flyweight (108 lbs) title.
1988-07-26	Loss	(Thailand) Pongsiri Por Ruamrudee	Lumpinee Stadium	Bangkok, Thailand	Decision	5	3:00
1988-06-24	Win	(Thailand) Karuhat Sor.Supawan	Onesongchai, Lumpinee Stadium	Bangkok, Thailand	Decision	5	3:00
1988-05-08	Win	(Thailand) Seesod Sor.Ritthichai	Lumpinee Stadium	Bangkok, Thailand	Decision	5	3:00
1988-04-15	Loss	(Thailand) Veeraphol Sahaprom	Ramkomut Pattani Boxing Stadium	Pattani Province, Thailand	Decision	5	3:00
1988-03-04	Loss	(Thailand) Paruhatlek Sitchunthong	Lumpinee Stadium	Bangkok, Thailand	Decision	5	3:00
1988-01-26	Win	(Thailand) Saeksan Sitjomthong	Lumpinee Stadium	Bangkok, Thailand	KO (Elbow)	3	
Wins the Lumpinee Stadium Mini Flyweight (105 lbs) title.
1987-12-29	Win	(Thailand) Pungluang Kiatanan	Lumpinee Stadium	Bangkok, Thailand	Decision	5	3:00
1987-11-27	Win	(Thailand) Boonthiang Bualuangprakan	Onesongchai, Lumpinee Stadium	Bangkok, Thailand	Decision	5	3:00
1987-08-29	Win	(Thailand) Boonthiang Bualuangprakan		Thung Song, Thailand	Decision	5	3:00
1987-07-31	Loss	(Thailand) Langsuan Panyuthaphum	Lumpinee Stadium	Bangkok, Thailand	KO (Knees)	3	
1987-07-04	Loss	(Thailand) Maewpa Suanmiskawan	Lumpinee vs Rajadamnern champion	Pattani, Thailand	KO (Elbow)	4	
1987-05-19	Win	(Thailand) Warunee Sor.Ploenchit	Lumpinee Stadium	Bangkok, Thailand	Decision	5	3:00
1987-03-31	Win	(Thailand) Yodmanut Sityodthong	Lumpinee Stadium	Bangkok, Thailand	KO	2	
1987-02-06	Win	(Thailand) Saeksan Sitjomthong	Lumpinee Stadium	Bangkok, Thailand	Decision	5	3:00
Defends the Lumpinee Stadium Mini Flyweight (105 lbs) title.
1987-01-13	Win	(Thailand) Dokmaipa Por.Pongsawang	Lumpinee Stadium	Bangkok, Thailand	Decision	5	3:00
1986-12-19	Win	(Thailand) Pungluang Kiatanan	Huamark Stadium	Bangkok, Thailand	Decision	5	3:00
Wins the Lumpinee Stadium Mini Flyweight (105 lbs) title.
1986-11-25	Win	(Thailand) Panomrunglek Chor.Sawat	Lumpinee Stadium	Bangkok, Thailand	Decision	5	3:00
1986-10-14	Loss	(Thailand) Pairojnoi Sor.Siamchai	Onesongchai, Lumpinee Stadium	Bangkok, Thailand	Decision	5	3:00
1986-09-09	Win	(Thailand) Dokmaipa Por.Pongsawang	Lumpinee Stadium	Bangkok, Thailand	Decision	5	3:00
Wins 200,000 baht side-bet.
1986-08-04	Loss	(Thailand) Pungluang Kiatanan	Lumpinee Stadium	Bangkok, Thailand	Decision	5	3:00
1986-07-11	Win	(Thailand) Songchainoi Por.Somchit	Lumpinee Stadium	Bangkok, Thailand	Decision	5	3:00
1986-05-30	Loss	(Thailand) Haodong Sor.Tasanee	Lumpinee Stadium	Bangkok, Thailand	Decision	5	3:00
1986-04-11	Win	(Thailand) Sameliyem Lilathai		Yala, Thailand	Decision	5	3:00
1986-03-08	Loss	(Thailand) Chaiyo Sor.Jitpattana	Petchyindee, Si Kim Yong Stadium	Hat Yai, Thailand	Decision	5	3:00
1986-02-09	Win	(Thailand) Pinyo Singpatong		Phuket, Thailand	Decision	5	3:00
1986-01-31	Win	(Thailand) Dentaksin Kiatrataphon		Su-ngai Kolok, Thailand	Decision	5	3:00
1985-11-23	Loss	(Thailand) Morakot Sor.Tamanrangsri		Hat Yai, Thailand	Decision	5	3:00
1985-10-15	Win	(Thailand) Chaichan Sor Sorklin		Samrong, Thailand	Decision	5	3:00
1985-09-30	Loss	(Thailand) Morakot Sor.Tamanrangsri	Rajadamnern Stadium	Bangkok, Thailand	Decision	5	3:00
1985-08-31	Win	(Thailand) Supermin Kiatsathaphon		Hat Yai, Thailand	Decision	5	3:00
1985-08-10	Win	(Thailand) Niwet Sor.Sawat		Chumphon, Thailand	Decision	5	3:00
1985-07-19	Win	(Thailand) Superlek Kiatchaiyut		Hat Yai, Thailand	Decision	5	3:00
1985-07-13	Loss	(Thailand) Supermin Kiatsathaphon		Nakhon Si Thammarat, Thailand	Decision	5	3:00
1985-07-05	Win	(Thailand) Dejtaha Saklaempho		Yala, Thailand	KO	4	
1985-06-15	Win	(Thailand) Nuapetch Sor.Tasanee		Chumphon, Thailand	KO	5	
1985-04-25	Loss	(Thailand) Niwet Sor.Sawat		Prachuap Khiri Khan, Thailand	Decision	5	3:00
1985-04-11	Win	(Thailand) Jinreetong Sitsahaphan		Chumphon, Thailand	KO	4	
1985-04-06	Win	(Thailand) Thongsabad Muangchaiyaphum	Mai Muangkhon, Ruenruedi Stadium	Nakhon Si Thammarat, Thailand	Decision	5	3:00
Wins 100,000 baht side-bet.
1985-	Loss	(Thailand) Saichon Pichitsuk	Lumpinee Stadium	Bangkok, Thailand	Decision	5	3:00
1985-03-03	Win	(Thailand) Khunponnoi Kiatphetnoi	Rajadamnern Stadium	Bangkok, Thailand	Decision	5	3:00
1985-01-28	Loss	(Thailand) Thongsabad Muangchaiyaphum	Rajadamnern Stadium	Bangkok, Thailand	Decision	5	3:00
1984-12-13	Win	(Thailand) Boonmee Sitchuchon	Rajadamnern Stadium	Bangkok, Thailand	Decision	5	3:00
Wins 100,000 baht side-bet.
Legend: Win Loss Draw/No contest Notes

== MC ==
Television

- 2022 : Muay Thai Fighter X - At OTF Stadium Hua Hin Prachuap Khiri Khan (Produced By ) Live every Saturday from 18:00 a.m.-20:00 p.m. On Air JKN18, YouTube:JKN18 Starting Saturday, February 19, 2022 – present (together with แบนท่าพระ (เดชา คูรัตนเวช), Kittisak Thabthong (กิตติศักดิ์ ทาบทอง))
