= Cédric Doumbé =

French mixed martial artist and kickboxer

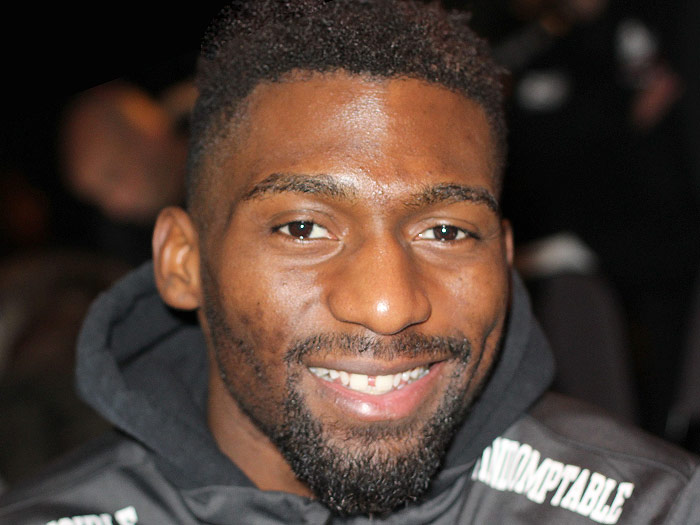
- Doumbé in 2016
- Born: August 30, 1992 (age 34); Douala, Cameroon
- Other names: Le Meilleur (The Best); Doumced
- Nationality: French; Cameroonian
- Height: 5 ft 8 in (1.73 m)
- Weight: 170 lb (77 kg; 12 st)
- Division: Welterweight
- Reach: 73 in (185 cm)
- Fighting out of: Paris, France
- Team: Atlantide Boxe 87; Mejiro Gym (kickboxing); MMA Factory (formerly); Queensburry (kickboxing); Full-Contact Boxing d'Angoulême (full contact)
- Trainer: Samir Mahjoubi; Hakim Aflalaye/Jamel Mokeddem
- Years active: 2011–present

Professional boxing record
- Total: 1
- Wins: 1
- Losses: 0

Kickboxing record
- Total: 83
- Wins: 75
- By knockout: 45
- Losses: 7
- Draws: 1

Mixed martial arts record
- Total: 7
- Wins: 6
- By knockout: 6
- Losses: 1
- By knockout: 1

Other information
- Boxing record from BoxRec
- Mixed martial arts record from Sherdog

Cédric Doumbé (born August 30, 1992) is a Cameroonian-born French professional mixed martial artist and former kickboxer, currently fighting in the Welterweight division of the Professional Fighters League (PFL).

In kickboxing, he is a former two-time Glory Welterweight Champion. Doumbé was ranked as the #1 welterweight in the world for several years by Combat Press and other publications. In 2016 he was named the Fighter of the Year by Combat Press and Liver Kick.

== Background ==
Born in Douala, Cameroon, Doumbé moved to France with his family at the age of nine. He and his sister were raised by their widowed mother as their father died in a car accident around the time Cédric was born. In his late teens, Cédric discovered full contact kickboxing and started training. He studied psychology, but dropped out of the university to pursue a career in kickboxing.

== Kickboxing career ==
=== Early career ===
On April 21, 2013, Doumbé defeated Sofinae May by decision at the annual Fight Club 71 event under full contact rules.

Doumbé took part in the 2013 French Full Contact Cup which he won in the A-class 75 kg division. He then made his muay thai rules debut at Boxing Factory Trophy 2013 on May 25, 2013, against Johan Granet who he defeated by first round knockout.

Doumbé faced Boris Gryniv for the WKA Full Contact World Super Middleweight title on October 26, 2013, at Le Choc des Guerriers III event. Doumbé won the fight by knockout in 13 seconds.

On November 30, 2013, Doumbé defeated Nacer El Hailoufi by fourth round technical knockout

On March 1, 2014, Douùbé travelled to Slovakia to face local Tomas Gut for the vacant WKA K-1 World Super Middleweight (-75 kg) title. He won the fight by second round knockout.

On April 26, 2014, Doumbé defeated Kamel Mezatni by first round knockout at the Tournoi du Dragon 8 event.

On May 4, 2014, Doumbé entered the Wicked One 8-man Muay Thai tournament. In the quarterfinals he knocked out Yacine Haddad in the first round. In the semifinals Doumbé would suffer the first defeat of his career in controversial manner against Raphael Mebenga. The fight was declared a draw after three rounds in which Mebenga received a knockdown in the second round. The four judges were asked to pick a winner due to a no draw and no extra round rule in this tournament. Two judges each picked one of the fighters which forced the supervisor to intervene and chose a winner which would be Mebenga. Doumbé's camp asked for reclamation both for the decision and for a count deemed long after a knockdown in the second round to the benefit of Mebenga.

On December 6, 2014, Doumbé faced Johane Beausejour at the Full Night 2014 event. He won the fight by unainmous decision.

Between 2015 and 2016, Cedric Doumbe went to Amsterdam every month to train at Mejiro Gym where he completed his style originally coming from full-contact with strong lowkicks that Mejiro Gym was famous for with fighters such as Rob Kaman. During his time at Mejiro Gym, Cedric trained with Roel Mannaart. He also had several fights, including in Glory, with Mejiro Gym sensei Andre Mannaart in his corner.

In 2015 Doumbe participated in the A1 World Grand Prix, at 75 kg. In the semi-finals he fought Djibril Ehouo, and won by a first-round KO. In the finals, he faced Vedat Hödük. He won a unanimous decision, after an extra round.

On January 10, 2016, Doumbé faced Belgian Mbamba Cauwenbergh at the Full Contact: Challenge TTT event in Wattrelos, France. He won the fight by technical knockout in the fourth round.

In 2016, he once participated in the A1 WGP tournament, at 75 kg. In the semi-finals he won a unanimous decision against Ben Hodge. In the finals, he fought a rematch against Djibril Ehouo. He once again won by knockout.

During the Monte Carlo Fighting Masters Series, he fought Ljubo Jalovi for the WAKO Pro K1 World Middleweight title. Doumbe won the fight by a unanimous decision.

Doumbe once again entered the A1 WGP Final Tournament. In the semi-finals he won a unanimous decision against Said Zahdi. In the finals, he fought a rematch against Vedat Hödük. This time the fight didn't go to decision, as Doumbe won the fight by a third-round knockout.

=== Glory ===
Doumbé had his first fight with Glory in 2015, during Glory 22: Lille, when he was scheduled to fight Yoann Kongolo as a short notice replacement for Karim Ghajji. Kongolo won a unanimous decision. Doumbé's second fight with Glory was more successful, as he achieved a unanimous decision win over Murthel Groenhart.

In December 2016, he faced Nieky Holzken for the Glory Welterweight title. Doumbe went into the fight as an underdog. He won the fight by a split decision, and became the first French champion in Glory history.

Doumbé made the first successful defense of his Glory welterweight title at Glory 39 on March 25, 2017 in Brussels, Belgium. He defeated Yoann Kongolo by unanimous decision.

He made his second title defense against Nieky Holzken during Glory 42: Paris. Doumbé entered the fight as a favorite to defend the title and successfully defended the title by a split decision.

His third title defense came during Glory 44: Chicago. Doumbé suffered a split decision loss to Murthel Groenhart.

After suffering the loss to Groenhart, Doumbé went on a 4–1 run. During this, he defeated Yohan Lidon, Thongchai Sitsongpeenong, Alan Scheinson, and Jimmy Vienot, with his lone loss during this run being a split decision loss to Alim Nabiev.

This run earned him a chance to fight for the Welterweight title, held at the time by Harut Grigorian. Doumbé won the fight by TKO, after knocking Grigorian down three times in the second round.

His first title defense of the second reign was a rematch against Alim Nabiev. Doumbé won the fight by a right cross knockout in the second round.

Doumbé was scheduled to fight Murthel Groenhart for the third time during Glory 70: Lyon. Doumbé was forced to withdraw from the fight, as he suffered an elbow injury. The trilogy was rescheduled for Glory 76, but the event was later cancelled due to the COVID-19 pandemic. The fight has been scheduled for a third time, for the Glory 76 event on November 7, 2020. The fight fell through once more, as main event fighter Badr Hari contracted COVID-19 and due to a partial lockdown imposed by the Dutch government. The fight was rescheduled for December 19. Groenhart was forced to withdraw from the fight, due to an injury, and was replaced by Karim Ghajji. He won the fight by a third round TKO.

The trilogy bout with Murthel Groenhart was rescheduled for Glory 77. He won the fight by a second-round knockout, stopping Groenhart by an overhand right.

Doumbé announced his retirement from kickboxing at an Empire Fight event in France on October 3, 2021, and announced his switch to MMA. Glory officially declared the welterweight title vacant on November 16, 2021.

== Mixed martial arts career ==
=== Superkombat Fighting Championship ===
In October 2021, Eduard Irimia announced that Superkombat Fighting Championship signed Doumbé to a contract. He would make his promotional debut at Superkombat Universe on November 1, 2021, against Arbi Emiev in the main event. Doumbé won the fight by a first-round technical knockout.

Doumbé was expected to face Patrick Spirk at MMAGP on July 9, 2022. Spirk withdrew for undisclosed reasons on July 5 and was replaced by Idriss M'roivili. M'roivili himself withdrew from the bout on July 7, after testing positive for COVID-19, and was replaced by Chai Title. He won the fight by a second-round technical knockout.

=== Ultimate Fighting Championship ===
Doumbé was scheduled to face Darian Weeks at UFC Fight Night 209 on September 3, 2022. However the fight was cancelled after the French MMA Federation (FMMAF) would not sanction the bout per the commission's rules that fighters with less than ten professional bouts must not have more than a four fight differential between them. Later in an interview with Ariel Helwani, Doumbé revealed that the MRI scan of his head indicated blood in his brain, which was the other primary reason why the bout was called off. Subsequently, he was released from his UFC contract also.

=== MMA Grand Prix ===
Doumbé returned to the French regionals, facing Florent Burillon on December 17, 2022 at MMA GP Bordeaux, knocking out his opponent at the end of the first round.

Doumbé faced Paweł Klimas on March 4, 2023 at MMA GP: Paris, winning the bout via TKO stoppage in the second round.

=== Professional Fighters League ===
On May 10, 2023, it was announced that Doumbé had signed a two-year contract with the Professional Fighters League (PFL), after entertaining offers from several major organizations including the UFC.

Doumbé was scheduled to make his promotional debut against Jarrah Al-Silawi on June 23, 2023 at PFL 6. However, Cedric had to pull out of the bout due to a wrist injury and was replaced by Zach Juusola.

Doumbé eventually made his PFL debut in the main event against Jordan Zébo at PFL Europe 3 on September 30, 2023. He won the fight by knockout just nine seconds into the first round.

Doumbé next faced fellow undefeated fighter Baissangour "Baki" Chamsoudinov on March 7, 2024 at PFL Europe 1 (2024). The bout ended in controversial fashion in the third round after Doumbé had a piece of glass embedded in his left foot's big toe. Rather than assess the situation, referee Marc Goddard immediately called the bout, resulting in a TKO due to injury loss for Doumbé.

=== Bellator MMA ===
Doumbé was scheduled to face Derek Anderson at Bellator Champions Series 2 on May 17, 2024. However, Anderson was involved in a hit-and-run accident that severely injured his left foot and withdrew from the bout. He was replaced by former LFA Welterweight Champion Jaleel Willis. Doumbé won the fight via TKO in the first round.

== Boxing career ==
Doumbé made his boxing debut on April 25, 2015 against Mohamed Fodil at the Espace Cordouan in Royan, France. Doumbé defeated Fodil on points.

It was announced on November 2, 2026 that Doumbé would make his return to boxing after eleven years, where he would take on Jake Paul on December 24 at the Coca-Cola Arena in Dubai.

== Championships and accomplishments ==
=== Kickboxing ===
- Glory
  - Glory Welterweight Champion (two times)
    - Five title defenses
    - Most total defences in Welterweight division history (5)
    - Most total title fight wins in Welterweight division history (7)
- A1 World Combat Cup
  - 2014 A1 Grand Prix 75 kg Tournament runner-up
- Partouche Kickboxing Tour
  - 2015 A1 Partouche Kickboxing Tour –75 kg Tournament winner
  - 2016 Partouche Kickboxing Tour –75 kg Tournament winner
- World Association of Kickboxing Organizations
  - 2016 WAKO Pro K-1 World Middleweight (–75 kg) Champion
- World Kickboxing Association
  - 2012 WKA Full Contact European Super Middleweight (-76 kg) Champion
  - 2013 WKA K-1 European Super Middleweight (-75 kg) Champion
  - 2013 WKA Full Contact World Super Middleweight (-76 kg) Champion
  - 2014 WKA K-1 World Super Middleweight (-75 kg) Champion
- Fédération fighting full contact et disciplines associées
  - FFCDA France Full Contact Cup A-class -75 kg Champion

=== Awards ===
- Combat Press
  - 2016 Combat Press Fighter of the Year
- LiverKick.com
  - 2016 LiverKick Fighter of the Year

== Mixed martial arts record ==
Professional record breakdown
7 matches	6 wins	1 loss
By knockout	6	1

Res.	Record	Opponent	Method	Event	Date	Round	Time	Location	Notes
Win	6–1	Jaleel Willis	TKO (punches)	Bellator Champions Series 2	May 17, 2024	1	3:33	Paris, France	Catchweight (175 lb) bout.
Loss	5–1	Baissangour Chamsoudinov	TKO (toe injury)	PFL Europe 1 (2024)	March 7, 2024	3	1:21	Paris, France	
Win	5–0	Jordan Zébo	KO (punch)	PFL Europe 3 (2023)	September 30, 2023	1	0:09	Paris, France	Fastest knockout in PFL history.
Win	4–0	Paweł Klimas	TKO (punches)	MMA Grand Prix: Paris	March 4, 2023	2	2:56	Paris, France	
Win	3–0	Florent Burillon	KO (punches)	MMA Grand Prix: Bordeaux	December 17, 2022	1	4:27	Bordeaux, France	
Win	2–0	Phruethukorn Chaichongcharden	TKO (doctor stoppage)	MMA Grand Prix: Fight of Fame	July 9, 2022	2	5:00	Paris, France	
Win	1–0	Arbi Emiev	TKO (punches)	Superkombat Universe	November 1, 2021	1	4:40	Dubai, United Arab Emirates	Welterweight debut.

== Kickboxing record ==
Professional kickboxing record
63 wins (41 (T)KOs), 7 losses, 1 draw
Date	Result	Opponent	Event	Location	Method	Round	Time
2021-01-30	Win	(Netherlands) Murthel Groenhart	Glory 77: Rotterdam	Rotterdam, Netherlands	KO (right cross)	2	2:52
Retains the Glory Welterweight Championship.
2020-12-19	Win	(France) Karim Ghajji	Glory 76: Rotterdam	Rotterdam, Netherlands	TKO (punches)	3	1:49
Retains the Glory Welterweight Championship.
2019-06-22	Win	(Azerbaijan) Alim Nabiev	Glory 66: Paris	Paris, France	KO (punches)	2	2:48
Retains the Glory Welterweight Championship.
2019-03-09	Win	(Armenia) Harut Grigorian	Glory 64: Strasbourg	Strasbourg, France	TKO (3 knockdowns rule)	2	2:59
Wins the Glory Welterweight Championship.
2018-10-20	Win	(France) Jimmy Vienot	Glory 60: Lyon	Lyon, France	Decision (unanimous)	3	3:00
2018-07-20	Win	(Argentina) Alan Scheinson	Glory 55: New York	New York	TKO (referee stoppage)	2	1:38
2018-05-12	Win	(Thailand) Thongchai Sitsongpeenong	Glory 53: Lille	Lille, France	KO (right cross)	1	0:33
2018-03-03	Loss	(Azerbaijan) Alim Nabiev	Glory 51: Rotterdam	Rotterdam, Netherlands	Decision (split)	3	3:00
2017-10-28	Win	(France) Yohan Lidon	Glory 47: Lyon	Lyon, France	Decision (unanimous)	3	3:00
2017-08-26	Loss	(Netherlands) Murthel Groenhart	Glory 44: Chicago	Hoffman Estates, Illinois, USA	Decision (split)	5	3:00
Loses the Glory Welterweight Championship.
2017-06-10	Win	(Netherlands) Nieky Holzken	Glory 42: Paris	Paris, France	Decision (split)	5	3:00
Retains the Glory Welterweight Championship.
2017-03-25	Win	(Switzerland) Yoann Kongolo	Glory 39: Brussels	Brussels, Belgium	Decision (unanimous)	5	3:00
Retains the Glory Welterweight Championship.
2016-12-10	Win	(Netherlands) Nieky Holzken	Glory: Collision	Oberhausen, Germany	Decision (split)	5	3:00
Wins the Glory Welterweight Championship.
2016-10-13	Win	(Turkey) Vedat Hödük	Partouche Kickboxing Tour 2016 - Final Tournament, Final	La Tour-de-Salvagny, France	KO (uppercut)	3	
Wins the 2016 Partouche Kickboxing Tour -75kg Tournament title.
2016-10-13	Win	(Belgium) Said Zahdi	Partouche Kickboxing Tour 2016 - Final Tournament, Semifinals	La Tour-de-Salvagny, France	Decision	3	3:00
2016-08-06	Win	(China) Chen Yawei	Glory of Heroes 4	Changzhi, China	KO (right hook)	1	
2016-06-24	Win	(Serbia) Ljubo Jalovi	Monte Carlo Fighting Masters series	Monte-Carlo, Monaco	Decision	5	3:00
Wins WAKO Pro K-1 World Middleweight (-75 kg) Title.
2016-05-27	Win	(Afghanistan) Maseh Nuristani	Prize Fighter	Australia	KO	1	
2016-05-07	Win	(New Zealand) Brad Riddell	Glory of Heroes 2	Shenzhen, China	Decision (split)	3	3:00
2016-04-09	Win	(France) Djibril Ehouo	Partouche Kickboxing 2016 - Qualification Tournament, Final	Le Havre, France	KO (punches)	2	
Qualifies for the 2016 Partouche Kickboxing Tour Final Tournament.
2016-04-09	Win	(United Kingdom) Ben Hodge	Partouche Kickboxing 2016 - Qualification Tournament, Semifinal	Le Havre, France	Decision	3	3:00
2016-03-12	Win	(Netherlands) Murthel Groenhart	Glory 28: Paris	Paris, France	Decision (unanimous)	3	3:00
2016-01-23	Loss	(China) Fang Bian	Wu Lin Feng 2016: World Kickboxing Championship in Shanghai	Shanghai, China	Ext. round decision (split)	4	3:00
2016-01-10	Win	(Belgium) Mbamba Cauwenbergh	Full Contact: Challenge TTT	Wattrelos, France	TKO (punches)	4	
2015-12-12	Win	(France) Mehdi Lacombe	Full Night	Agde, France	Decision (unanimous)	5	2:00
2015-11-14	Win	(France) Mohamed Mafoud	La Nuit des Champions 2015	Marseille, France	KO (overhand right)	3	
2015-10-31	Win	(Portugal) Ricardo Cabral	Knock Out Championship	La Tour-de-Salvagny, France	Decision (unanimous)	3	3:00
2015-10-15	Win	(Turkey) Vedat Hödük	Partouche Kickboxing Tour - A1 World Grand Prix, Final	La Tour-de-Salvagny, France	Ext. R decision (unanimous)	4	3:00
Wins 2015 A1WCC Partouche Kickboxing Tour -75kg Tournament.
2015-10-15	Win	(France) Djibril Ehouo	Partouche Kickboxing Tour - A1 World Grand Prix, Semifinals	La Tour-de-Salvagny, France	TKO (punches)	1	
2015-06-05	Loss	(Switzerland) Yoann Kongolo	Glory 22: Lille	Lille, France	Decision (unanimous)	3	3:00
2015-05-22	Win	(France) Bakari Tounkara	Partouche Kickboxing Tour - Etape 2, Final	Forges-les-Eaux, France	TKO (punches)	1	
Qualifies for the 2015 Partouche Kickboxing Tour 75 kg Final Tournament.
2015-05-22	Win	(France) Jimmy Iftene	Partouche Kickboxing Tour - Etape 2, Semi-finals	Forges-les-Eaux, France	KO (Left hook)	1	
2015-01-10	Win	(France) Stan Martin	Full Kick Challenge TTT	Wattrelos, France	Decision (unanimous)	5	2:00
2014-12-06	Win	(France) Johane Beausejour	Full Night VIII	Agde, France	Decision (unanimous)	5	2:00
2014-10-23	Loss	(France) Yohan Lidon	A1 Grand Prix Tournament, Final	Lyon, France	Decision	3	3:00
For the A1 Grand Prix Tournament 75 kg title.
2014-10-23	Win	(Belarus) Yuri Bessmertny	A1 Grand Prix Tournament, Semifinals	Lyon, France	TKO (doctor stoppage)	3	
2014-09-27	Loss	(Switzerland) Yoann Kongolo	Jurafight	Delémont, Switzerland	Decision (unanimous)	3	3:00
2014-06-05	Draw	(Turkey) Vedat Hödük	Kader Marouf Presents at Garden Golf Club Mionnay	Mionnay, France	Decision	3	3:00
2014-05-17	Win	(Spain) Miguel Lopez	Athletic's Fights	Bassens, France	KO	3	
2014-05-04	Loss	(France) Raphael Mebenga	WICKED ONE Tournament 5, Semifinals	Paris, France	Decision (supervisor choice)	3	3:00
2014-05-04	Win	(France) Yacine Haddad	WICKED ONE Tournament 5, Quarterfinals	Paris, France	TKO (referee stoppage)	1	
2014-04-26	Win	(France) Kamel Mezatni	Tournoi du Dragon 8	Saint-Yzan-de-Soudiac, France	KO (punches)	1	
2014-03-08	Win	(France) Jimmy Iftene	K.O.C Dynamite	Angoulême, France	KO (left hook)	1	
2014-03-01	Win	(Slovakia) Tomas Gut	Nitrianska noc bojovníkov 2014	Nitra, Slovakia	KO (punches)	2	
Wins WKA K-1 World Super Middleweight (-75 kg) Title.
2014-01-25	Win	(France) Eddy Lacrosse	Star Fighting	Cenon, France	Decision (unanimous)	7	2:00
2013-12-14	Win	(France) Patrick Madisse	Les Guerriers du Ring	Eysines, France	Decision (split)	3	3:00
2013-11-30	Win	(France) Nacer El Hailoufi	La Nuit de la Boxe	Sainte-Eulalie, France	TKO	4	
2013-10-26	Win	(Ukraine) Boris Gryniv	Le Choc des Guerriers III	Angoulême, France	KO (right cross)	1	0:13
Wins WKA Full Contact World Super Middleweight (-76 kg) Title.
2013-06-15	Win	(Gabon) Mbiame	Les Guerriers du Ring	Eysines, France	KO	1	
2013-05-25	Win	(France) Johan Granet	Boxing Factory Trophy 2013	Colomiers, France	KO (left hook)	1	
2013-05-19	Win	(France)	2013 FFFCDA France Full Contact Cup, Final	Melun, France	Decision (unanimous)	7	2:00
Wins 2013 FFFCDA French Full Contact Cup Pro A-class -75kg title.
2013-05-18	Win	(France) Johnny Richard	2013 FFFCDA France Full Contact Cup, Semifinals	Melun, France	Decision (unanimous)	5	2:00
2013-04-21	Win	(France) Sofiane May	Fight Club 71	Montceau-les-Mines, France	Decision (unanimous)	7	2:00
2013-03-23	Win	(France) Johnny Richard	Le Choc des Titans 11	Lormont, France	Decision (unanimous)	5	2:00
2013-02-17	Win	(Italy) Davide Saini	Pitbull Arena	Pontedera, Italy	KO	1	
Wins WKA K-1 European Super Middleweight (-75 kg) Title.
2012-12-08	Win	(France) Eddy Lacrosse	Les Guerriers du Ring	Eysines, France	Decision (unanimous)	7	2:00
2012-10-27	Win	(Portugal) Jorge Silva	Le Choc des Guerriers II	Angoulême, France	Decision (unanimous)	5	2:00
Wins WKA Full Contact European Super Middleweight (-76 kg) Title.
2012-04-21	Win	(France) Frédéric Ficet	Tournoi du Dragon 6, Final	Saint-Yzan-de-Soudiac, France	TKO (3 knockdowns)	5	
2012-04-21	Win	(France) Eddy Lacrosse	Tournoi du Dragon 6, Semifinals	Saint-Yzan-de-Soudiac, France	KO	2	
2011-11-26	Win	(England) Christopher Evans	Le Choc des Guerriers I	Angoulême, France	KO	1	
2011-06-18	Win	(France)	Les Guerriers du Ring 8	Eysines, France			
B-class debut.
Legend: Win Loss Draw/no contest Notes

== Professional boxing record ==
1 fight	1 win	0 losses
By decision	1	0

No.	Result	Record	Opponent	Type	Round, time	Date	Location	Notes
1	Win	1–0	Mohamed Fodil	PTS	4	25 Apr 2015	Espace Cordouan, Royan, France	

== Television ==
Year	Title	Role	Notes
2020	The Circle	Himself	Episode 1.1 to 1.6
2026	The Arena	Himself	

== See also ==
- List of current PFL fighters
- List of male kickboxers
- List of male mixed martial artists
- List of mixed martial artists with professional boxing records
- List of prizefighters with professional boxing and kickboxing records
