= Murthel Groenhart =

Dutch-Surinamese mixed martial artist

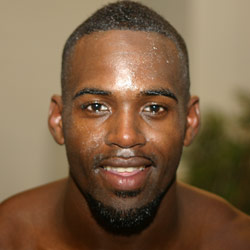
- Born: Murthel Cyrill Dwyth Groenhart; October 10, 1986 (age 40); Amsterdam, Netherlands
- Other names: The Predator
- Height: 1.85 m (6 ft 1 in)
- Weight: 77 kg (170 lb; 12.1 st)
- Division: Lightweight; Welterweight; Middleweight; Super Middleweight
- Style: Kickboxing
- Stance: Orthodox
- Fighting out of: Amsterdam, Netherlands
- Team: Mike's Gym
- Trainer: Mike Passenier
- Years active: 2004–present

Kickboxing record
- Total: 100
- Wins: 70
- By knockout: 40
- Losses: 27
- By knockout: 5
- Draws: 3

Mixed martial arts record
- Total: 3
- Wins: 3
- By knockout: 1
- By decision: 2
- Losses: 0

Other information
- Website: murthelgroenhart.com
- Boxing record from BoxRec
- Mixed martial arts record from Sherdog
- Last updated on: September 28, 2020

Murthel Cyrill Dwyth Groenhart (born October 10, 1986) is a Dutch-Surinamese kickboxer and mixed martial artist. Groenhart is the 2012 K-1 World MAX World Championship Tournament Champion and former Glory Welterweight Champion.

== Kickboxing career ==
=== Early years ===
Groenhart began his kickboxing career fighting on small shows in the Netherlands. He made his SLAMM debut in 2006, losing both of his fights with the organization, including a decision loss to Leroy Kaestner at B-Klass level. In 2008, Groenhart was invited by the K-1 organization to take part in an eight-man tournament, which had originally been intended for heavyweights but was changed later for fighters around the 75 kg bracket. Groenhart won the competition in spectacular fashion, dispatching all three of his opponents by stoppage on the night to take the title in Milan.

=== It's Showtime ===
The performance at the K-1 tournament led to Groenhart being invited to take part in a fight within the It's Showtime organization – the Netherlands biggest kickboxing organization. He lost his debut to It's Showtime Reality winner Sem Braan but impressed enough to be invited back for further matches. Although an impressive fighter with a good knockout ratio, Groenhart has had up and down performances within the organization, winning fights against the likes of Yassin Boudrouz and Joep Beerenpoot by knockout, but losing to Vladimir Moravcik and being knocked out by Ali Cenik, fights he should have been expected to do better in. Groenhart has also fought and lost to top class fighters such as Cosmo Alexandre and Nieky Holzken – with the loss against Holzken after an extension round, being slightly unfortunate for some who felt Groenhart deserved more. Despite some inconsistent performances, Groenhart won the vacant E.M.T.A. European title at the start of 2010, defeating Amir Zeyada in an impressive showing.

=== K-1 ===
Groenhart ventured up to the 79 kg division to face Marc de Bonte at Glory 2: Brussels on October 6, 2012, in Brussels, Belgium and scored another come-from-behind victory as he knocked his opponent out with a knee strike in the second round.

Groenhart went on to win the K-1 World MAX 2012 World Championship Tournament Final in Athens, Greece on December 15, 2012, stopping Yasuhiro Kido and Mike Zambidis before knocking out his stable-mate Artur Kyshenko in the final.

=== Glory ===
==== Early career ====
Groenhart faced Robin van Roosmalen at Glory 7: Milan in Milan, Italy on April 20, 2013, losing a unanimous decision after getting dropped in round one.

Groenhart lost to Davit Kiria via unanimous decision at Glory 10: Los Angeles - Middleweight World Championship Tournament in Ontario, California, United States on September 28, 2013. He joined the Blackzilians camp in preparation for the fight.

Groenhart was expected to fight Shemsi Beqiri on the Glory 14: Zagreb undercard in Zagreb, Croatia on March 8, 2014 but Beqiri withdrew due to an injury was replaced by Teo Mikelić. Mikelić dropped him with a right cross early in round one but Groenhart climbed off the canvas and went to work, opening a cut on the Croatian that prompted a doctor's stoppage after the first round.

Replacing his stablemate Artur Kyshenko who conceded that he would be unable to make the contracted weight of -71 kg/156 lb, Groenhart stepped in to face Dzhabar Askerov at Legend 3: Pour Homme in Milan, Italy on April 5, 2014. He was fortunate not to be counted by referee Atsushi Onari in the early goings after succumbing to knockdown courtesy of a left hook by Askerov, but he soon made quick work of the Russian, dropping him with a right hook before putting him away with a left hook inside the opening round.

He had another fight outside of Glory, when he fought in the Kunlun Fight four man tournament. In the quarter-finals he faced Sitthichai Sitsongpeenong. He lost the fight in the third round by a head kick KO.

==== 2015 Glory Contender Tournament ====
He returned to Glory during Glory 23, being scheduled to fight Chad Sugden. Murthel lost the fight by a split decision.

Despite the loss, he took part in the Welterweight Contender Tournament. He beat Nicola Gallo by TKO in the second round, as the fight was called by the ringside doctor due to a cut. In the finals he won a unanimous decision against Karim Ghajji.

Winning the tournament earned a title shot against Nieky Holzken. He lost the fight by a split decision. He afterwards fought Cédric Doumbé, but lost the fight by a unanimous decision.

Briefly leaving Glory, Groenhart took part in the 2015 WFL 76 kg tournament. In the semi-finals he won a unanimous decision against Marco Pique. In the final he fought and beat Sem Braan by a third-round KO.

He fought Artur Kyshenko during Kunlun Fight 43. The fight went into an extra fourth round, where Kyshenko won a decision.

==== 2016 Glory Contender Tournament ====
He returned to Glory to take part in the Welterweight Contender Tournament. He beat Karim Benmansour in the semifinals by a second-round TKO, after knocking Karim down three times. In the finals, he beat Yoann Kongolo by unanimous decision.

He fought Jonatan Oliveira during Kunlun Fight 50. Groenhart won the fight by a second-round TKO following three knockdowns.

==== Holzken trilogy ====
After winning the contender tournament, he fought Nieky Holzken for the third time in his career. Holzken convincingly won the fight by a unanimous decision.

After his failed title bid, he won his next three fights. He first fought Thongchai Sitsongpeenong during Glory 38 and won by a third-round TKO, Alan Scheinson during Glory 41, winning by split decision, and Harut Grigorian during Glory 42, winning by KO. The fight with Grigorian ended in controversy, as Groenhart delivered a knockout punch to a seemingly dazed Grigorian, who started to return to his corner after absorbing a flying knee to the head. The punch rendered Grigorian unconscious while the prior knee left him dazed and bleeding profusely. Grigorian's fans jumped into the ring after his loss and started a melee with Groenhart and his corner.

==== Title fights ====
Groenhart fought Cedric Doumbe in a rematch during Glory 44, for the Glory Welterweight title. Groenhart won the fight by a split decision.

Murthel was scheduled to make his first title defense against Harut Grigorian during Glory 50. Grigorian won the fight in the first round, by TKO.

Groenhart rebounded from his title loss with a second-round TKO finish of Mohammed Jaraya, but dropped a split decision in his next fight to Alim Nabiev.

Groenhart was scheduled to fight Cedric Doumbe for the Glory Welterweight title, held at the time by Doumbe. Doumbe suffered an elbow injury before the fight, and was replaced by Troy Jones, with Groenhart and Jones fighting for the interim title. Groenhart beat Jones by KO in the second round.

Groenhart and Doumbe were scheduled to unify the titles at Glory 76. The fight was rescheduled for November 7, 2020, due to the COVID-19 pandemic cancelling the first event. The fight with Doumbe was indefinitely postponed, as main event fighter Badr Hari contracted COVID-19 and due to a partial lockdown imposed by the Dutch government. The fight was rescheduled for December 19. Groenhart was forced to withdraw from the fight, due to an injury.

Groenhart's fight with Cédric Doumbé was rescheduled for Glory 77. He lost the fight by a second-round knockout.

Groenhart challenged Endy Semeleer for the Glory Welterweight Championship at Glory 85 on April 29, 2023. He lost the fight by unanimous decision.

Groenhart faced Cihad Akipa at Glory 87 on August 19, 2023. He won the fight by unanimous decision.

== Mixed martial arts career ==
Groenhart was scheduled to make his mixed martial arts debut against Ullubiy Ataev at Levels Fight League 3 on October 10, 2021. Ataev later withdrew from the bout and was replaced by Mohamed Soumah. Soumah later withdrew as well and was replaced by Kristof Kirsch. Groenhart beat Kirsch by unanimous decision.

Groenhart was expected to face Ammari Diedrick at Levels Fight League 4 on November 28, 2021. The event was later postponed for March 13, 2022, with Diedrick being replaced with Marcelino Kemna. Groenhart won the bout after knocking Kemna down with a flying knee and then finishing him with ground and pound.

Groenhart was expected to face Karim Ghajji at ARES 6 on May 20, 2022. The bout was later scrapped for undisclosed reasons.

Groenhart was booked to face Max Siewruk at Levels Fight League 6 on October 2, 2022. In a last minute substitution, Siewruk had to pull out of the bout and was replaced by Hyram Rodriguez. Groenhart won the bout via unanimous decision.

== Titles ==
- Glory
  - Glory Welterweight Championship (one time)
  - 2016 Glory Welterweight Contender Tournament winner
  - 2015 Glory Welterweight Contender Tournament winner
- World Fight League
  - 2016 WFL -76 kg Tournament Champion
- K-1
  - K-1 Rising ~ K-1 WORLD MAX 2012 Champion
  - 2008 K-1 Italy Oktagon tournament champion −75 kg
- E.M.T.A.
  - 2010 E.M.T.A. K-1 rules European champion −76 kg
- Angels of Fire
  - 2007 Angels of Fire II tournament title −75 kg

== Mixed martial arts record ==
Professional record breakdown
3 matches	3 wins	0 losses
By knockout	1	0
By submission	0	0
By decision	2	0

Res.	Record	Opponent	Method	Event	Date	Round	Time	Location	Notes
Win	3–0	Hyram Rodriguez	Decision (unanimous)	Levels Fight League 6	2 October 2022	3	5:00	Amsterdam, Netherlands	
Win	2–0	Marcelino Kemna	TKO (flying knee and punches)	Levels Fight League 4	13 March 2022	2	2:04	Amsterdam, Netherlands	
Win	1–0	Kristof Kirsch	Decision (Unanimous)	Levels Fight League 3	10 October 2021	3	5:00	Amsterdam, Netherlands	

== Kickboxing record ==
Kickboxing record
70 wins (40 (T)KOs), 27 losses, 3 draws
Date	Result	Opponent	Event	Location	Method	Round	Time
2023-12-23	Loss	(Bulgaria) Teodor Hristov	Glory 90	Rotterdam, Netherlands	Decision (unanimous)	3	3:00
2023-08-19	Win	(Germany) Cihad Akipa	Glory 87	Rotterdam, Netherlands	Decision (unanimous)	3	3:00
2023-04-29	Loss	(Curaçao) Endy Semeleer	Glory 85	Rotterdam, Netherlands	Decision (unanimous)	5	3:00
For the Glory Welterweight Championship.
2021-01-30	Loss	(France) Cédric Doumbé	Glory 77: Rotterdam	Rotterdam, Netherlands	KO (overhand right)	2	2:52
For the Glory Welterweight Championship.
2019-10-26	Win	(United States) Troy Jones	Glory 70: Lyon	Lyon, France	KO (punches)	2	2:38
Wins the interim Glory Welterweight Championship.
2019-03-09	Loss	(Azerbaijan) Alim Nabiev	Glory 64: Strasbourg	Strasbourg, France	Decision (split)	3	3:00
2018-09-29	Win	(Morocco) Mohammed Jaraya	Glory 59: Amsterdam	Amsterdam, Netherlands	TKO (punches)	2	1:05
2018-02-17	Loss	(Armenia) Harut Grigorian	Glory 50: Chicago	United States	TKO (referee stoppage)	1	2:07
Loses the Glory Welterweight Championship.
2017-08-26	Win	(France) Cedric Doumbe	Glory 44: Chicago	Hoffman Estates, Illinois, USA	Decision (split)	5	3:00
Wins the Glory Welterweight Championship.
2017-06-10	Win	(Armenia) Harut Grigorian	Glory 42: Paris	Paris, France	KO (punch)	2	
2017-05-20	Win	(Argentina) Alan Scheinson	Glory 41: Holland	Den Bosch, Netherlands	Decision (split)	3	3:00
2017-02-24	Win	(Thailand) Thongchai Sitsongpeenong	Glory 38: Chicago	Hoffman Estates, Illinois	TKO (punches)	3	1:45
2016-10-21	Loss	(Netherlands) Nieky Holzken	Glory 34: Denver	Broomfield, Colorado	Decision (unanimous)	5	3:00
For the Glory Welterweight Championship.
2016-08-20	Win	(Brazil) Jonatan Oliveira	Kunlun Fight 50 – 80 kg Tournament, Quarter-finals	Jinan, China	TKO (3 knockdowns rule)	2	1:04
2016-06-25	Win	(Switzerland) Yoann Kongolo	Glory 31: Amsterdam - Welterweight Contender Tournament, Final	Amsterdam, Netherlands	Decision (unanimous)	3	3:00
Wins the Glory Welterweight Contender Tournament.
2016-06-25	Win	(France) Karim Benmansour	Glory 31: Amsterdam - Welterweight Contender Tournament, Semi-finals	Amsterdam, Netherlands	TKO (3 knockdowns rule)	3	1:08
2016-04-23	Loss	(Ukraine) Artur Kyshenko	Kunlun Fight 43	Zhoukou, China	Ext R. decision	4	3:00
2016-04-03	Win	(Netherlands) Sem Braan	WFL - Where Heroes Meet Legends, Final	Almere, The Netherlands	KO (right cross)	3	
Wins the WFL -76 kg Tournament Title.
2016-04-03	Win	(Suriname) Marco Pique	WFL - Where Heroes Meet Legends, Semi-final	Almere, The Netherlands	Decision (unanimous)	3	3:00
2016-03-12	Loss	(France) Cedric Doumbe	Glory 28: Paris	Paris, France	Decision (unanimous)	3	3:00
2015-12-04	Loss	(Netherlands) Nieky Holzken	Glory 26: Amsterdam	Amsterdam, Netherlands	Decision (split)	5	3:00
For the Glory Welterweight Championship.
2015-11-06	Win	(France) Karim Ghajji	Glory 25: Milan - Welterweight Contender Tournament, Final	Monza, Italy	Decision (unanimous)	3	3:00
Wins the Glory Welterweight Contender Tournament.
2015-11-06	Win	(Italy) Nicola Gallo	Glory 25: Milan - Welterweight Contender Tournament, Semi-finals	Monza, Italy	TKO (cut)	2	1:03
2015-08-07	Loss	(United Kingdom) Chad Sugden	Glory 23: Las Vegas	Las Vegas, Nevada, USA	Decision (split)	3	3:00
2015-01-03	Loss	(Thailand) Sitthichai Sitsongpeenong	Kunlun Fight 15: The World MAX Return - Middleweight Tournament, Semi-finals	Nanjing, China	KO (high kick)	3	
2014-04-05	Win	(Russia) Dzhabar Askerov	Legend 3: Pour Homme	Milan, Italy	KO (cartwheel kick)	1	2:08
2014-03-08	Win	(Croatia) Teo Mikelić	Glory 14: Zagreb	Zagreb, Croatia	TKO (cut)	1	3:00
2013-09-28	Loss	(Georgia (country)) Davit Kiria	Glory 10: Los Angeles	Ontario, California, USA	Decision (unanimous)	3	3:00
2013-08-03	Win	(Netherlands) Elizio Cabral	FightCult "BEATDOWN"	Paramaribo, Suriname	TKO (flying knee)	1	
2013-04-20	Loss	(Netherlands) Robin van Roosmalen	Glory 7: Milan	Milan, Italy	Decision (unanimous)	3	3:00
2012-12-15	Win	(Ukraine) Artur Kyshenko	K-1 World MAX 2012 World Championship Tournament Final, Final	Athens, Greece	KO (right overhand)	3	0:54
Wins the K-1 World MAX 2012 World Championship Tournament.
2012-12-15	Win	(Greece) Mike Zambidis	K-1 World MAX 2012 World Championship Tournament Final, Semi-finals	Athens, Greece	TKO (doctor stoppage/cut)	2	3:00
2012-12-15	Win	(Japan) Yasuhiro Kido	K-1 World MAX 2012 World Championship Tournament Final, Quarter-finals	Athens, Greece	KO (right high kick)	1	1:47
2012-10-06	Win	(Belgium) Marc de Bonte	Glory 2: Brussels	Brussels, Belgium	KO (right knee)	2	
2012-07-21	Win	(Spain) Maximo Suarez	It's Showtime 59	Tenerife, Spain	TKO (doctor stoppage)	2	
2012-05-27	Win	(Armenia) Harut Grigorian	K-1 World MAX 2012 World Championship Tournament Final 16	Madrid, Spain	KO (Superman punch and knees)	3	2:00
2011-11-12	Win	(Suriname) Darryl Sichtman	Street Culture, Fight Club Group & Canary Kickboxing Federation presents: It’s Showtime 53	Tenerife, Spain	Decision (unanimous)	3	3:00
2011-09-24	Loss	(Russia) Artem Levin	BFN Group & Music Hall presents: It's Showtime "Fast & Furious 70MAX"	Brussels, Belgium	KO (left knee to the body)	5	1:51
Fight was for It's Showtime 77MAX title.
2011-06-18	Win	(Spain) Rafi Zouheir	It's Showtime Madrid 2011	Madrid, Spain	TKO (corner stoppage)	1	2:16
2011-06-11	Win	(Netherlands) Errol Koning	BFN Group presents: It's Showtime Warsaw	Warsaw, Poland	Decision (split)	3	3:00
2010-12-18	Loss	(Morocco) Khalid Bourdif	Fightclub presents: It's Showtime 2010	Amsterdam, Netherlands	Decision	3	3:00
2010-10-16	Loss	(Netherlands) Nieky Holzken	United Glory 12: 2010–2011 World Series Quarterfinals	Amsterdam, Netherlands	Ext.R decision	4	3:00
2010-09-12	Win	(Netherlands) Joep Beerenpoot	Fightingstars presents: It's Showtime 2010	Amsterdam, Netherlands	KO (right high kick)	1	
2010-04-17	Win	(Hungary) Daniel Géczi	It's Showtime 2010 Budapest	Budapest, Hungary	TKO		
2010-02-27	Win	(Egypt) Amir Zeyada	Amsterdam Fight Club 3	Amsterdam, Netherlands	TKO (doc stop/cut)	1	
Wins vacant E.M.T.A. K-1 rules European title −76 kg.
2009-10-24	Loss	(Turkey) Ali Cenik	It's Showtime 2009 Lommel	Lommel, Belgium	KO (overhand right)	2	
2009-08-29	Loss	(Slovakia) Vladimir Moravcik	It's Showtime 2009 Budapest	Budapest, Hungary	Decision	3	3:00
2009-04-24	Win	(Turkey) Mehmet Aygun	Ergen Ring Atesi 4	Istanbul, Turkey	KO (left high kick)	3	
2009-03-14	Loss	(Brazil) Cosmo Alexandre	Oktagon presents: It's Showtime 2009	Milan, Italy	Decision (unanimous)	3	3:00
2009-02-08	Win	(Morocco) Yassin Boudrouz	Fights at the Border presents: It's Showtime 2009	Antwerp, Belgium	KO	1	
2008-11-29	Loss	(Netherlands) Sem Braan	It's Showtime 2008 Eindhoven	Eindhoven, Netherlands	Decision (unanimous)	3	3:00
2008-04-12	Win	(Morocco) Halim Issaoui	K-1 Italy Oktagon 2008, Final	Milan, Italy	KO	3	
Wins K-1 Italy Oktagon 2008 tournament title −75 kg.
2008-04-12	Win	(Morocco) Yassin Boudrouz	K-1 Italy Oktagon 2008, Semi-final	Milan, Italy	TKO		
2008-04-12	Win	(Italy) Marco Santi	K-1 Italy Oktagon 2008, Quarter-final	Milan, Italy	KO		
2008-03-08	Win	(Belgium) Jan de Keyzer	Gala Lommel	Lommel, Belgium	KO	2	
2008-02-09	Draw	(Netherlands) Matias Ipssa	North Disturbed	Amsterdam, Netherlands	Decision draw	5	3:00
2007-10-27	Win	(Poland) Piotr Woźnicki	Angels of Fire II, Final	Płock, Poland	TKO	1	
Wins Angels of Fire II tournament title −75 kg.
2007-10-27	Win	(Poland) Łukasz Rambalski	Angels of Fire II, Semi-final	Płock, Poland	TKO	2	
2007-10-27	Win	(Poland) Rafał Dudek	Angels of Fire II, Quarter-final	Płock, Poland	KO	3	
2007-09-17	Loss	(France) Gregory Choplin	It's Showtime Reality, Tournament First Round	Koh Samui, Thailand	Decision (unanimous)	3	3:00
2007-04-22	Win	(Netherlands) Benito Linger	Muay Thai Gala Landsmeer	Landsmeer, Netherlands	Decision	5	2:00
2007-02-04	Win	(Netherlands) Cedric Burgzorg	Muay Thai-MMA Gala Groningen	Groningen, Netherlands	Decision	5	2:00
2006-12-16	Win	(Netherlands) Ilias Zbairi	Fight4Life Gala	Netherlands	KO	2	
2006-10-01	Loss	(Netherlands) Leroy Kaestner	SLAMM "Nederland vs Thailand II"	Almere, Netherlands	Decision (unanimous)	5	2:00
2006-03-19	Loss	(Netherlands) Lindo Prophase	SLAMM "Nederland vs Thailand"	Almere, Netherlands	Decision	5	2:00
2006-02-06	Win	(Netherlands) Iliad Oufkir	Muay Thai Gala in Oostzaan	Oostzaan, Netherlands	TKO (corner stop/knees)	1	
2005-10-02	Win	(Morocco) Karim Al Jouharati	It's Showtime 75MAX Trophy, 1st round - Tilburg, Opening fight	Tilburg, Netherlands	TKO	5	
2005-04-10	Draw	(Canada) Trevor Smandych	Urban Destruction 1	Bristol, England	Decision	5	
2004-12-19	Win	(Morocco) Fahid Maroun	Gala Landsmeer	Landsmeer, Netherlands	Decision	3	2:00
2004-11-14	Win	(Netherlands) Guillermo Codrington	Muay Thai/Mixed Gala Kickass Fight Promotions	Almere, Netherlands	Decision	3	2:00
2004-09-18	Win	(Netherlands) Earl Marica	Herring Gulls	Zaandam, Netherlands	Decision	3	2:00
Legend: Win Loss Draw/no contest Notes

== See also ==
- List of male kickboxers
- List of K-1 champions
