= Karim Ghajji =

French-Moroccan kickboxer

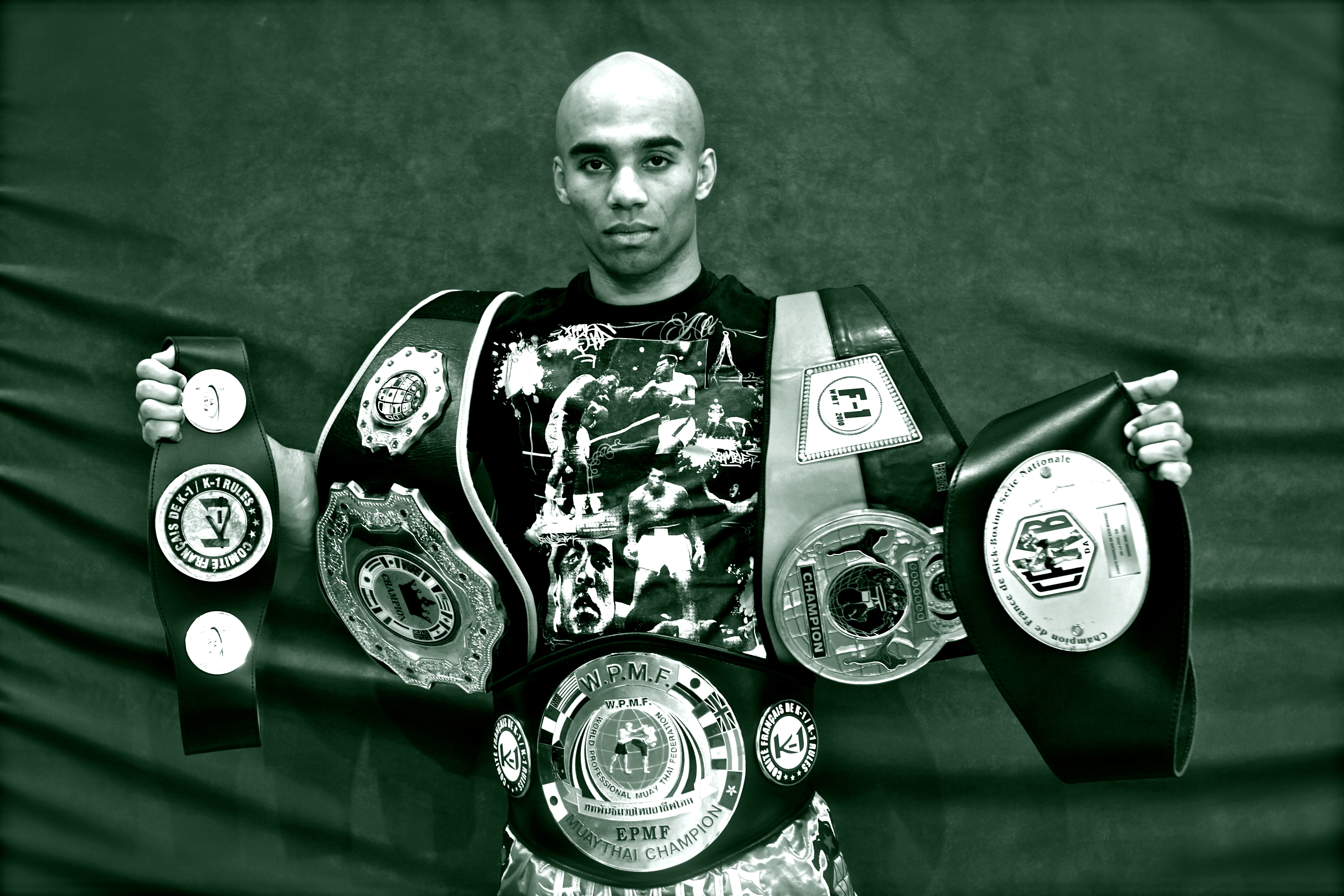
- Born: January 16, 1981 (age 45); France
- Other names: Boss2fin
- Height: 1.78 m (5 ft 10 in)
- Weight: 77.1 kg (170 lb; 12.14 st)
- Division: Middleweight
- Reach: 72.3 in (184 cm)
- Style: Karate, kickboxing
- Fighting out of: Meaux, France
- Team: Fantastik Armada; 818Boxing
- Trainer: Heddy belkacem; Moogli; Francois hacard; Edgar Ponce
- Years active: 1993–present

Kickboxing record
- Total: 122
- Wins: 103
- By knockout: 53
- Losses: 18
- By knockout: 5
- Draws: 1

Mixed martial arts record
- Total: 7
- Wins: 3
- By submission: 3
- Losses: 4
- By knockout: 1
- By decision: 3

Other information
- Mixed martial arts record from Sherdog
- Last updated on: June 22, 2019

Karim Ghajji (born January 16, 1981), is a French-Moroccan kickboxer and B-boy. He is a former Glory Welterweight Championship challenger.

Combat Press ranked him in the welterweight top ten between September 2014 and April 2018.

== Biography and career ==
Karim Ghajji is a French boxer of Moroccan descent; he resides in Meaux, France, and is part of Fantastik Armada. It is one of the fighters of 2009 and 2010.

Karim began karate at the age of 12 and in parallel, he has learned breakdance with his classmates, because at the time it was fashionable. Gradually, the two disciplines have become important in his life. His trainer is Abel El Quandili.

Turned pro in kickboxing since 3 years, he is now captain of France in the same discipline.

In 2010 he made a great tournament in Dijon at the UKC France MAX and reached the final. He won K1 Pro French title, K1 W.P.M.F European title and F-1 World Max Tournament. On 4 September, he won SportAccord Combat Games gold medal.

He defeated Dmitry Valent via decision at Nuit des Champions in Marseille on November 24, 2012.

On December 15, 2012, he defeated Luis Reis and Jeremy Ragazzagi, respectively, on points to win the WKN 75 kg Full Contact European Grand Prix at Full Night 6 in Agde, France.

Ghajji caused a major upset by winning the 72.5 kg Muay Thai tournament at La Nuit des Titans in Tours, France on February 2, 2013. In the semi-finals, he had his rubber match with Yohan Lidon and won on points after a close fight. Then, in the final, he knocked out the much-fancied Eakpracha Meenayotin in the first round with a combination of a high kick, straight left, knee and a huge right hand.

Ghajji KO'd Darko Delic at Explosion Fight Night 7 in Châteauroux, France on March 16, 2013.

He made his debut with major kickboxing promotion Glory against Nieky Holzken at Glory 6: Istanbul in Istanbul Turkey on April 6, 2013, losing via TKO due to a cut in an extension round.

Ghajji defeated Yuri Bessmertny via unanimous decision at Time Fight 3 in Tours, France on June 15, 2013.

He was TKO'd by Joseph Valtellini late in round three at Glory 11: Chicago - Heavyweight Championship Tournament in Hoffman Estates, Illinois, United States on October 12, 2013.

He lost to Alexander Stetsurenko by unanimous decision in the Glory 13: Tokyo - Welterweight World Championship Tournament reserve match in Tokyo, Japan on December 21, 2013.

He defended his ISKA title during Final Fight 2, when he defeated Ruben Garcia Gonzales by decision.

Ghajji took part in the 2015 Glory Welterweight Contender Tournament. He won a majority decision against Yoann Kongolo in the semi-finals, but lost a unanimous decision to Murthel Groenhart in the finals.

In his next fight, Ghajji fought Mustapha Haida for the inaugural Bellator Kickboxing Welterweight Championship. Karim won by a split decision. He lost the title in his first title defense against Zoltan Laszak by a split decision. The two met again a year later, and Ghajji recaptured the title by a split decision. Ghajji once again failed to defend the Bellator title, as he lost to Raymond Daniels by a first round TKO during Bellator KB 7.

Ghajji defended the ISKA belt two additional times, against Enrico Carrara and Giannis Boukis, to bring his total tally of ISKA title defenses up to 15.

In December 2020, Ghajji was scheduled to fight Cédric Doumbé for the Glory Welterweight Championship, as a late notice replacement for Murthel Groenhart. He lost the title fight by a third round TKO.

Ghajji faced Jordan Zebo in a MMA bout on May 20, 2022, at Ares FC 6. He lost by the way of unanimous decision.

Ghajji faced Ammari Diedrick on January 20, 2023, at Ares FC 11, losing by the way of split decision.

== Titles and achievements ==
=== Professional ===
- World Association of Kickboxing Organizations
  - 2024 WAKO Pro Low Kick World Super-middleweight (78.1 kg) Champion
- International Sport Karate Association
  - 2019 I.S.K.A. Oriental Rules World Champion (-78 kg) (6 title defences)
  - 2019 I.S.K.A. Oriental Rules World Champion (-78 kg) (5 title defences)
  - 2018 I.S.K.A. Oriental Rules World Champion (-78 kg) (4 title defences)
  - 2014 I.S.K.A. Oriental Rules World Champion (-78 kg) (3 title defences)
  - 2012 I.S.K.A. Oriental Rules World Champion (-75 kg) (4 title defences)
- Bellator Kickboxing
  - 2016 Bellator Kickboxing Welterweight Championship (two times)
- Glory
  - 2015 Glory Welterweight Contender Tournament runner-up
- La Nuit des Titans
  - 2013 La Nuit des Titans Tournament champion (-72.5 kg)
  - 2011 La Nuit des Titans 4 Men K-1 Rules Tournament Champion (-73 kg)
- World Kickboxing Network
  - 2012 WKN Full Contact European Grand Prix champion (-75 kg)
- Boxe in Défi
  - 2012 "boxe in défi" tournament champion belt (-76 kg)
- Nuit des Champions
  - 2011 "Nuit des Champions" Full Contact belt (-76 kg)
- Urban Boxing United
  - 2011 "Urban Boxing United 2" Super Fight belt
- ProFight Karate
  - 2010 ProFight Karate Middleweight Tournament Champion
- F-1
  - 2010 F-1 World Max Tournament Champion (-74 kg)
- World Professional Muaythai Federation
  - 2010 K1 W.P.M.F. European Champion (-72.5 kg)
- Fédération Française de Sports de Contacts et Disciplines Associées
  - 2010 FFSCDA K1 Pro French Champion (-72 kg)
  - 2009 FFSCDA A-Class French Kickboxing Champion (-74 kg)
- UKC
  - 2010 UKC France MAX Tournament Runner-up (-70 kg)
- Others
  - 2009 Sanda (Chinese Kickboxing) French Champion
- FFKB
  - 2008 FFKB A-Class French Kickboxing Vice Champion (-74 kg)

=== Amateur ===
  - 2010 SportAccord World Combat Games Kick-Boxing - Low-Kick Champion (gold) (-75 kg)
  - 2009 WAKO World Kick-Boxing Championships, Villach Austria (silver) (-75 kg)
  - 4 times Karate-Contact French Champion
  - 4 times winner of the Karate-Contact France Cup

== Mixed martial arts record ==
Professional record breakdown
7 matches	3 wins	4 losses
By knockout	0	1
By submission	3	0
By decision	0	3

Res.	Record	Opponent	Method	Event	Date	Round	Time	Location	Notes
Win	3–4	Raphael Ngoma	Submission (armbar)	Fight And Furious in Octogon	27 January 2024	1	2:21	Longeville-lès-Metz, France	Won the vacant FAF Welterweight Championship.
Loss	2–4	Ammari Diedrick	Decision (split)	Ares FC 11	20 January 2023	3	5:00	Paris, France	
Loss	2–3	Jordan Zébo	Decision (unanimous)	Ares FC 6	20 May 2022	3	5:00	Paris, France	
Loss	2–2	Marek Jakimowicz	TKO (punches and elbows)	Ares FC 4	10 March 2022	1	4:43	Paris, France	
Win	2–1	Wallace Felipe	Submission (rear-naked choke)	MMA Grand Prix 1	8 October 2020	2	3:59	Vitry-sur-Seine, France	
Win	1–1	Laïd Zerhouni	Submission (triangle choke)	Octogone: 2nd Edition	26 May 2018	1	2:29	Marseille, France	
Loss	0–1	Manuel Vincent-Sully	Decision (Unanimous)	100% Fight: Contenders 8	2 October 2010	2	5:00	Paris, France	

== Kickboxing record ==
Professional kickboxing record
106 wins (54 (T)KOs), 18 losses, 1 draw
Date	Result	Opponent	Event	Location	Method	Round	Time
2026-04-30	Win	(Greece) Ioannis Sofokleous	Championnat du Monde ISKA	Paris, France	TKO	3	
Wins the interim ISKA Kickboxing World Super Middleweight (-78 kg) title.
2026-02-12	Win	(Italy) Mattia Fato	Gala International Kickboxing	Chartres, France	Decision	3	3:00
2024-09-07	Win	(Spain) Alex Fernandez	Boxing Event	El Jadida, Morocco	Decision (unanimous)	5	3:00
Wins the vacant WAKO Pro Low Kick World Super-middleweight (78,1 kg) title.
2023-09-09	Loss	(Serbia) Nikola Todorović	Glory 88	Paris, France	Decision (unanimous)	3	3:00
2020-12-19	Loss	(France) Cédric Doumbé	Glory 76: Rotterdam	Rotterdam, Netherlands	TKO (punches)	3	1:30
For the Glory Welterweight Championship.
2019-12-12	Win	(Greece) Giannis Boukis	Triumph Fighting Tour III	Paris, France	Decision	5	3:00
Defends ISKA K1 Rules World title (-78 kg).
2019-11-09	Win	(Albania) Kristos Cacaj	Meaux Fight 8	Meaux, France	TKO (corner stoppage)	2	3:00
2019-06-13	Win	(Spain) Jordi Fernandez	Triumph Fighting Tour II	Paris, France	KO (low kick)	4	2:44
2019-02-16	Win	(Spain) Alcorac Caballero	K1 Event 12	Troyes, France	Decision	3	3:00
2018-12-01	Loss	(Belarus) Yuri Bessmertny	Bellator Kickboxing 11	Italy	Decision (unanimous)	3	3:00
2018-09-22	Win	(Italy) Enrico Carrara	Le Trophée Des Etoiles	Aix-en-Provence, France	KO (low kick)	3	3:00
Defends ISKA K1 Rules World title (-78 kg).
2018-05-05	Loss	(Portugal) Diogo Calado	Capital Fights 3	France	Extra round decision	4	3:00
2017-09-23	Loss	(United States) Raymond Daniels	Bellator Kickboxing 7	San Jose, California, United States	TKO (doctor stoppage)	1	3:00
Lost Bellator Kickboxing Welterweight Championship.
2017-04-14	Win	(Hungary) Zoltan Laszak	Bellator Kickboxing 6	Budapest, Hungary	Decision (split)	5	3:00
Wins Bellator Kickboxing Welterweight Championship.
2016-12-10	Win	(Italy) Luca Novello	Bellator Kickboxing 4	Florence, Italy	Decision (unanimous)	3	3:00
2016-09-17	Loss	(Hungary) Zoltan Laszak	Bellator Kickboxing 3	Budapest, Hungary	Decision (split)	5	3:00
Lost Bellator Kickboxing Welterweight Championship.
2016-04-16	Win	(Morocco) Mustapha Haida	Bellator Kickboxing 1	Turin, Italy	Decision (split)	5	3:00
Wins the Inaugural Bellator Kickboxing Welterweight Championship.
2015-11-06	Loss	(Netherlands) Murthel Groenhart	Glory 25: Milan - Welterweight Contender Tournament, Final	Monza, Italy	Decision (unanimous)	3	3:00
For the Glory Welterweight Contender Tournament.
2015-11-06	Win	(Switzerland) Yoann Kongolo	Glory 25: Milan - Welterweight Contender Tournament, Semi-finals	Monza, Italy	Decision (majority)	3	3:00
2015-04-25	Win	(Spain) Ruben Garcia Gonzales	Final Fight 2	Évreux, France	Decision	5	3:00
Defends ISKA Oriental Rules World title (-78 kg).
2015-04-11	Win	(Italy) Fabio Siciliani	Oktagon 2015: 20 Years Edition	Milan, Italy	Decision (unanimous)	3	3:00
2015-03-14	Win	(England) Kevin Ward	Duel des maitres II	Villepinte, France	Decision	5	3:00
Defends ISKA Oriental Rules World title (-78 kg).
2014-12-13	Win	(Russia) Alexander Stetsurenko	Victory	Paris, France	Decision (unanimous)	3	3:00
2014-30-05	Win	(Morocco) Mustapha Haïda	Final Fight I	Le Havre, France	Decision	5	3:00
For ISKA Oriental Rules World title (-78 kg).
2014-22-03	Win	(Portugal) Dan Balsemao	Meaux Fight 3	Paris, France	Decision	5	3:00
Defends ISKA K1 Rules World title (-75 kg).
2014-02-01	Win	(England) Nigel Thomas	Explosion Fight Night 9	Châteauroux, France	Decision	5	3:00
Defends ISKA K1 Rules World title (-75 kg).
2013-12-21	Loss	(Russia) Alexander Stetsurenko	Glory 13: Tokyo - Welterweight World Championship Tournament, Reserve Match	Tokyo, Japan	Decision (unanimous)	3	3:00
2013-11-16	Win	(Germany) Alex Schmitt	Explosion Fight Night 8	France	TKO	5	
Defends ISKA K1 Rules World title (-75 kg).
2013-10-12	Loss	(Canada) Joseph Valtellini	Glory 11: Chicago - Heavyweight World Championship Tournament	Hoffman Estates, Illinois, United States	TKO (punches and right high kick)	3	2:53
2013-06-15	Win	(Belarus) Yuri Bessmertny	Time Fight 3	Tours, France	Decision (unanimous)	3	3:00
2013-04-06	Loss	(Netherlands) Nieky Holzken	Glory 6: Istanbul	Istanbul, Turkey	TKO (cut)	4	
2013-03-16	Win	(Serbia) Darko Delic	Explosion Fight Night 7	Châteauroux, France	KO	1	
Defends ISKA K1 Rules World title (-75 kg).
2013-02-02	Win	(Thailand) Eakpracha Meenayotin	La Nuit des Titans, Final	Tours, France	KO (left knee and right overhand)	1	
Wins La Nuit des Titans Tournament title (-72.5 kg).
2013-02-02	Win	(France) Yohan Lidon	La Nuit des Titans, Semi-finals	Tours, France	Decision	3	3:00
2012-12-15	Win	(France) Jeremy Ragazzagi	Full Night 6, Final	Agde, France	Decision	3	3:00
Wins the 2012 WKN 75kg Full Contact European Grand Prix title.
2012-12-15	Win	(Portugal) Luis Reis	Full Night 6, Semi-finals	Agde, France	Decision	3	3:00
2012-11-24	Win	(Belarus) Dmitry Valent	Nuit des Champions	Marseille, France	Decision	5	3:00
2012-06-09	Win	(Hungary) Patrik Kontraszti	Gala du Phenix Muaythai 4	Trets, France	KO	3	
Defends ISKA K1 Rules World title (-75 kg).
2012-04-28	Loss	(Thailand) Naruepol Fairtex	Boxe Thai et K1 Rules à Bagnolet	Paris, France	Decision	5	3:00
2012-04-07	Win	(Portugal) Francisco Matos	Explosion Fight Night Volume 05	Châteauroux, France	Decision	5	3:00
Wins ISKA K1 Rules World title (-75 kg).
2012-03-17	Win	(France) Yannick Tamas	Boxe in défi XIII, Tournament, Final	Muret, France	Decision	4	2:00
Wins Boxe in défi XIII, Tournament belt (-76 kg).
2012-03-17	Win	(Serbia) Stevan Živković	Boxe in défi XIII, Tournament, Semi-final	Muret, France	Decision	3	2:00
2011-11-12	Win	(France) Sebastien Pace	La 18ème Nuit des Champions	Marseille, France	Decision	7	2:00
Wins "Nuit des Champions" Full Contact belt -76 kg.
2011-10-01	Win	(France) Karim Benmansour	F-1 World MAX 2011	Meyreuil, France	Decision		
2011-07-17	Loss	(Thailand) Yodsanklai Fairtex	Thai Fight Extreme	Hong Kong, China	Decision	3	3:00
2011-05-07	Win	(France) Karim Benmansour	Urban Boxing United 2	Marseille, France	Decision (unanimous)	5	3:00
Wins "Urban Boxing United 2" Super Fight belt.
2011-02-12	Win	(France) Sébastien Billard	La Nuit des Titans, Tournament, Final	Tours, France	TKO (corner stoppage)	3	
Wins La Nuit des Titans 4 Men K-1 Rules Tournament (-73 kg).
2011-02-12	Win	(Turkey) Tuncay Aydın	La Nuit des Titans, Tournament, Semi-final	Tours, France	Decision	3	3:00
2010-11-27	Win	(Chechnya) Chamil Batchaev	ProFight Karate Middleweight Tournament, Final	Toulon, France	Decision		
Wins ProFight Karate Middleweight Tournament.
2010-11-27	Win	(France) Hamza Ridène	ProFight Karate Middleweight Tournament, Semi-final	Toulon, France	Decision		
2010-09-25	Win	(France) Yohan Lidon	F-1 World MAX 2010, Final	Meyreuil, France	Decision	3	2:00
Wins F-1 World MAX Tournament title (-74 kg).
2010-09-25	Win	(France) Samir Dourid	F-1 World MAX 2010, Semi-final	Meyreuil, France	TKO	2	
2010-09-04	Win	(Turkey) Alpay Kır	SportAccord World Combat Games, Final -75 kg	Beijing, China	Decision (3-0)	3	2:00
Wins SportAccord Combat Games Kick-Boxing - Low-Kick 75kg gold medal.
2010-09-03	Win	(Azerbaijan) Kanan Sadikhov	SportAccord World Combat Games, Semi-finals -75 kg	Beijing, China	Decision (3-0)	3	2:00
2010-06-19	Win	(Belgium) Yassin Baitar	Explosion Fight Night Volume 01	Brest, France	KO	5	
Wins K1 W.P.M.F European title (-72.500 kg).
2010-04-30	Win	(France) Mehdi Baghdad	Urban Boxing United	Marseille, France	TKO (cut)	3	
Wins K1 Pro French title (-75 kg).
2010-02-06	Loss	(France) Abdallah Mabel	UKC France MAX, Final	Dijon, France	KO (right flying knee)	2	
Fight was for UKC France MAX Tournament title (-70 kg).
2010-02-06	Win	(Armenia) Marat Grigorian	UKC France MAX, Semi-final	Dijon, France	Decision	3	3:00
2010-02-06	Win	(Czech Republic) Jakub Gazdík	UKC France MAX, Quarter-final	Dijon, France	KO	1	
2009-12-12	Win	(France) Sebastien Pace	Full Night III	Agde, France	KO	7	
2009-11-21	Win	(Portugal) Marco Silva	Portugal vs France	Algarve, Portugal	KO	3	
2009-09-26	Loss	(France) Yohan Lidon	F-1 World MAX 2009, Semi-final	Meyreuil, France	Decision	3	2:00
2009-05-30	Win	(Albania) Arton Berisha	France vs Germany	Strasbourg, France	KO	3	3:00
2009-04-25	Win	(France) Benjamin Gerbet	French Kickboxing Championships A-Class Elite, Final	Paris, France	Decision	5	2:00
Wins French Kickboxing Championships 2009 A-Class Elite title (-74 kg).
2008-12-06	Draw	(France) Sebastien Pace	Full Night II	Agde, France	Decision draw	7	2:00
2008-06-07	Win	(France) Bakari Tounkara	Le Choc des Boxes	Paris, France	Decision (unanimous)	5	2:00
2008-04-17	Loss	(France) Bakari Tounkara	French Kickboxing Championships FFKB A-Class, Final	Paris, France	Decision	5	2:00
Fight was for French Kickboxing Championships 2008 A-Class (74 kg).
2008-03-08	Win	(France) Mustapha Hamiche	French Kickboxing Championships FFKB A-Class, Semi-final	Paris, France	Decision		
2008	Win	(France) Thomas Diagne	French Kickboxing Championships FFKB A-Class, Final 8	Paris, France	Decision	4	
2007-12-08	Win	(Spain) Jordan Gomez	Full Night I	Agde, France	TKO (broken jaw)	2	

Amateur kickboxing record
Date	Result	Opponent	Event	Location	Method	Round	Time
2014-10-23	Loss	(Russia) Khasan Khaliev	W.A.K.O European Championships 2014, Low-Kick Semi-finals -75 kg	Bilbao, Spain	Decision (unanimous)	3	2:00
2014-10-21	Win	(Poland) Jerzy Wronski	W.A.K.O European Championships 2014, Low-Kick First Round -75 kg	Bilbao, Spain	Decision (unanimous)	3	2:00
2010-09-	Win	(Turkey) Alpay Kır	2010 World Combat Games Kickboxing Low-Kick (-75 kg), Final	Beijing, China	Decision	3	2:00
Wins 2010 World Combat Games Kickboxing Low-Kick (-75 kg) Gold Medal.
2009-10-25	Loss	(Turkey) Alpay Kır	World KickBoxing Championship WAKO	Villach, Austria	Decision (2-1)	3	2:00
Wins WAKO World KickBoxing Championships 2009 silver medal (-75 kg).
2009-10-23	Win	(Azerbaijan) Kanan Sadikhov	World KickBoxing Championship WAKO, Semi-final	Villach, Austria	Decision (3-0)	3	2:00
2009-10-23	Win	(Kyrgyzstan) Kumar Jaliev	World KickBoxing Championship WAKO, Quarter-final	Villach, Austria	Decision (3-0)	3	2:00
2009-10-21	Win	(Brazil) Pinherio Leonardo	World KickBoxing Championship WAKO, Final 8	Villach, Austria	KO	1	2:00
2008-11-26	Loss	(Croatia) Luka Simic	European Kickboxing Championships, Final 8	Guimarães, Portugal	Decision		

== See also ==
- List of male kickboxers
