= Madelyne Delcroix =

French aviator

Madelyne Delcroix (born 30 January 1946) is a French former champion aviator and aerobatics pilot.

Delcroix was born in Wattrelos, in Nord, France.

In 1964, Delcroix participated in the Marcel Doré Cup. In 1966, at the age of 20, Delcroix competed in the World Aerobatics Championships in Moscow, finishing fifth in the women's section. In 1968, she won the women's division of the World Championships in Magdeburg, Germany, flying a Zlin 526 aircraft. With this victory, Delcroix became the first French aviator to win an international aerobatics title.

After retiring from active aerobatics, Delcroix worked for the International Aerobatic Club, organising aerobatic championship competitions. She also serves as a jury member for competitions, such as the FAI World Glider Aerobatic Championships.
