= Yoann Kongolo =

Swiss martial artist

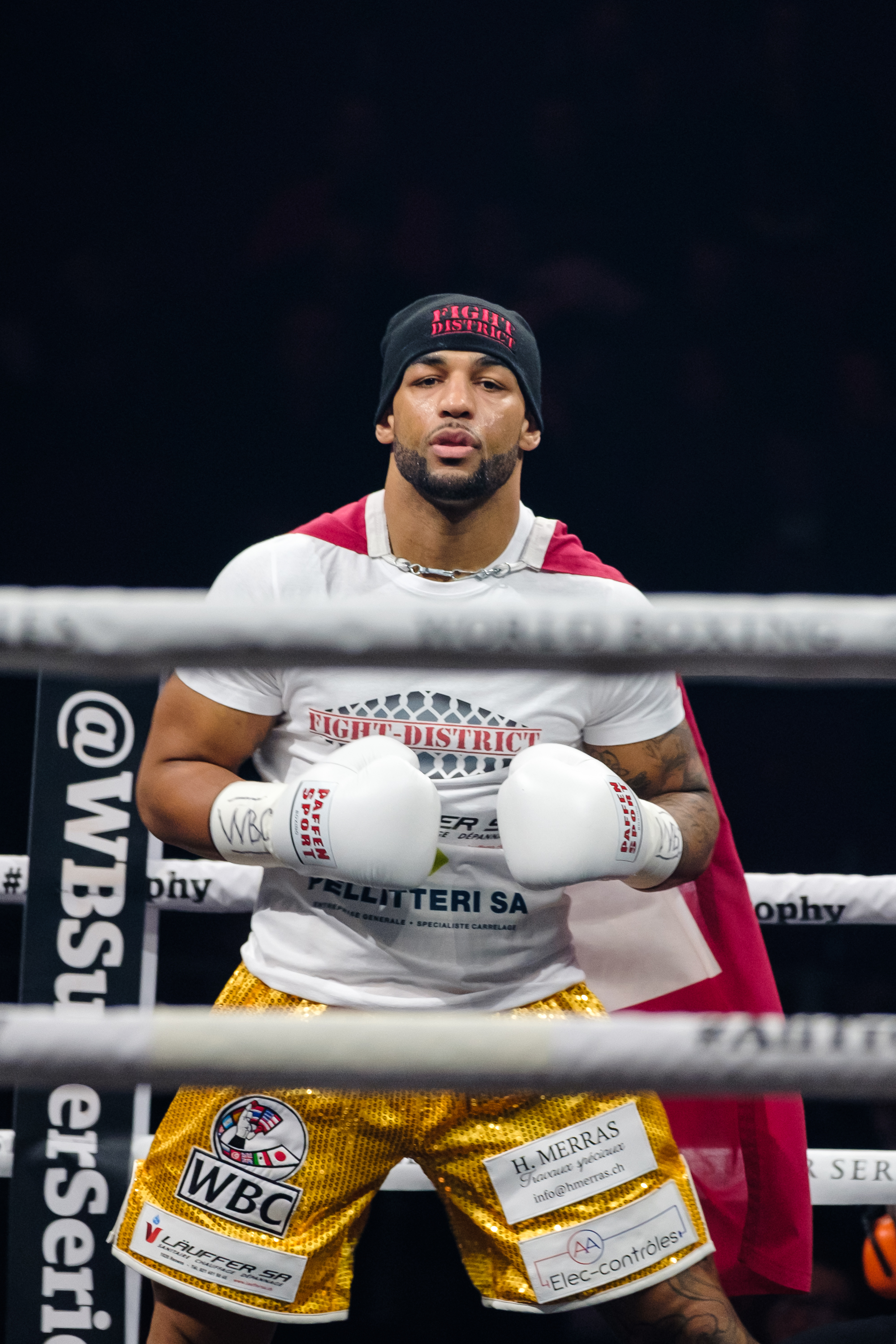
- Born: Yoann Bernard Kongolo; September 11, 1987 (age 39); Switzerland
- Nationality: Swiss, French
- Height: 1.77 m (5 ft 9 1/2 in)
- Weight: 79 kg (174 lb; 12.4 st)
- Reach: 69.5 in (177 cm)
- Style: Kickboxing, Boxing
- Fighting out of: Lausanne, Switzerland
- Team: Fight District Lausanne

Professional boxing record
- Total: 19
- Wins: 15
- By knockout: 5
- Losses: 3
- By knockout: 1
- Draws: 1

Kickboxing record
- Total: 76
- Wins: 67
- By knockout: 47
- Losses: 9
- Draws: 0

Other information
- Boxing record from BoxRec

Yoann Bernard Kongolo is a Swiss-French boxer and Muay Thai kickboxer of DR Congo descent who competes in the welterweight division of Glory. He has also competed for SUPERKOMBAT.

He was ranked in the welterweight top 10 by Combat Press.

== Kickboxing career ==
=== Early years ===
Kongolo was scheduled to fight Miran Fabjan for the WKN European Super Middleweight title. Kongolo won the fight by decision. He made his first title defense against Peter Baumler, winning by a first round KO.

In 2014, he fought Roberto Cocco for the WKN Intercontinental Super Middleweight Championship. Kongolo won the fight by split decision.

=== SUPERKOMBAT ===
At the end of 2014, after the victory over Cédric Doumbé in the regional circuit, Kongolo signed with the largest continental promotion SUPERKOMBAT Fighting Championship. He made his debut in native Switzerland on 25 October 2014 against Jamie Bates at SUPERKOMBAT World Grand Prix 2014 Final Elimination, stopping him in the 3rd round in light-heavyweight title eliminator.

=== GLORY ===
Next year, Kongolo signed with the largest promotion in the world Glory and fought in the 2015 Glory Welterweight Contender tournament. He lost to Karim Ghajji in the semifinals.

During Glory 29, Kongolo challenged for the Glory Welterweight title, held at the time by Nieky Holzken. Holzken won the fight by unanimous decision.

He participated in the 2016 Glory Welterweight Contender Tournament. He managed to win a split decision against Harut Grigorian in the semifinals, but lost a unanimous decision to Murthel Groenhart in the finals.

Kongolo took part in the 2017 Glory Welterweight Contender Tournament. In the semifinals, he won a unanimous decision against Konstantin Khuzin. In the finals, he prevailed against Karim Benmansour by a third round TKO.

Yoann was scheduled to fight a rematch with Cedric Doumbe during Glory 39, for the Glory Welterweight title. Kongolo was less successful then in their first fight, losing by unanimous decision.

Kongolo was scheduled to fight Yohan Lidon during Glory 42: Paris. Yoann won the fight by unanimous decision.

He fought Abdallah Mabel in November 2018. Kongolo won the fight by unanimous decision.

Kongolo fought Dmitry Menshikov during Glory 69: Düsseldorf. He lost the fight at the tail end of the second round, by TKO, as the ringside doctor stopped the fight.

=== Doping suspension ===
On 11 September 2019, it was announced that Kongolo was sanctioned by the National Anti-Doping Agency of France with a 4-year ban and a fine of €5,000 due to the presence of methandrostenolone and stanozolol. The ban applies from 30 September 2019. Kongolo tested positive on 4 August 2018 at Fight Night in Saint-Tropez, France.

== Professional boxing career ==
In 2017 Kongolo fought Salambek Baysangurov for the vacant World Boxing Council International Silver Light Heavyweight title. He won the fight by majority decision. He successfully defended the title against Andrejs Pokumeiko, winning by unanimous decision.

He won the vacant EBU External Light Heavyweight title with a decision win against Enes Zecirevic.

== Championships and accomplishments ==
=== Kickboxing ===
- Glory
  - 2017 Glory Welterweight Contender Tournament Champion
  - 2016 Glory Welterweight Contender Tournament Runner Up
- SUPERKOMBAT Fighting Championship
  - 2014 Best Debut
- World Kickboxing Network
  - WKN European Super Middleweight (-79.40 kg/175 lb) Championship (One time)
- Swiss Kickbox Federation (SKBF)
  - 2010 Swiss Championship Class A
  - 2009 Swiss Championship Class B

=== Muay Thai ===
- Swiss Muay Thai Federation
  - 2010 Swiss (-81 kg) Championship Class A (SG)
  - 2009 Swiss Championship Class B (SG)
  - 2009 Swiss (-81 kg) Championship Class B (WH)

=== Boxing ===
- World Boxing Council
  - 2017 World Boxing Council International Silver Light Heavy Title
- European Boxing Council
  - 2017 EBU External Light Heavy Title

=== Karate ===
- World Koshiki Karatedo Federation (WKKF)
  - 2009 World Koshiki Karatedo Championship Kumite Rules (Singles) (bronze)
  - 2009 World Koshiki Karatedo Championship Kata Kumite Bunkai Rules (Team) (bronze)
  - 2007 World Koshiki Karatedo Championship Kumite Rules (Heavyweight Singles) (silver)
  - 2007 World Koshiki Karatedo Championship Kata Kumite Bunkai Rules (Heavyweight Team) (silver)

== Professional Boxing record ==
22 fights	18 wins	3 losses
By knockout	7	1
By decision	11	2
Draws	1	

No.	Result	Record	Opponent	Type	Round, time	Date	Location	Notes
23			(Turkey) Mehmet Unal			11 Jun 2026	Capitole de Quebec, Quebec City, Canada	For the WBC Continental Americas Light Heavyweight title
22	Loss	18-3-1	(Switzerland) Angel Roque	MD	10	20 Dec 2025	Hallenstadion, Zurich, Switzerland	For the vacant WBC Francophone Super Middleweight title
21	Win	18-2-1	(Venezuela) Melbyn Hernandez	UD	6	24 Oct 2025	Salle Forestay, Puidoux, Switzerland	
20	Loss	17-2-1	(Spain) Jose Luis Navarro jr.	TKO	11 (12)	28 Feb 2025	Mad Fight Stadium, San Sebastian de Los Reyes, Spain	For the vacant EBU Silver Super Middleweight title
19	Win	17-1-1	(France) Jonathan Cotteret	TKO	3 (6)	21 Sept 2024	Theatre de Beausobre, Morges, Switzerland	
18	Win	16-1-1	(Moldova) Edgard Moskvichev	SD	10	29 June 2024	Hilton Geneva, Geneva, Switzerland	Won the vacant WBC CISBB Super Middleweight title
17	Win	15-1-1	(Romania) Alexandru Crasnitchii	TKO	3 (6)	7 March 2024	Salle des Fetes, Carouge, Switzerland	
16	Draw	14-1-1	(Argentina) Facundo Nicolas Galovar	D-MD	8	26 December 2019	Kursaal Arena, Berne, Switzerland	
15	Win	14-1	(Georgia (country)) Levan Shonia	UD	6	28 June 2019	Theatre du Leman, Geneva, Switzerland	
14	Win	13-1	(Serbia) Geard Ajetović	UD	6	26 December 2018	Kursaal Arena, Berne, Switzerland	
13	Win	12-1	(Serbia) Milosav Savic	KO	3	13 December 2018	Cirque de Noel, Geneva, Switzerland	
12	Loss	11-1	(France) Doudou Ngumbu	MD	12	25 May 2018	Palais des Sports, Toulouse, France	For the World Boxing Council Francophone Light Heavy Title
11	Win	11-0	(Latvia) Andrejs Pokumeiko	UD	10	27 January 2018	Arena Riga, Riga, Latvia	For the World Boxing Council International Silver Light Heavy Title
10	Win	10-0	(Bosnia and Herzegovina) Enes Zecirevic	UD	12	4 November 2017	Hotel Ramada, Geneva, Switzerland	For the vacant EBU External Light Heavy Title
9	Win	9-0	(Russia) Salambek Baysangurov	MD	10	26 August 2017	Club Loftas, Vilnius, Lithuania	For the vacant World Boxing Council International Silver Light Heavy Title
8	Win	8-0	(Cuba) Julio Acosta	TKO	2 (8)	14 July 2017	Palacio de los Deportes, Valencia, Spain	
7	Win	7-0	(United Kingdom) Nathan King	UD	6	12 May 2017	(United Kingdom) Guildhall, Southampton, England	
6	Win	6-0	(Russia) Inal Ramonov	TKO	2	2 December 2016	Tough Fight Gym, Moscow, Russia	
5	Win	5-0	(Georgia (country)) Zura Mekereshvili	UD	6	2 December 2016	Studio 69, Riga, Latvia	
4	Win	4-0	(Russia) Konstantin Piternov	UD	6	23 September 2016	Olimp, Krasnodar, Russia	
3	Win	3-0	(Russia) Sergey Beloshapkin	TKO	3 (6)	26 August 2016	Tough Fight Gym, Moscow, Russia	
2	Win	2-0	(United States) Johnathon Blue	TKO	4 (4)	13 March 2015	(United States) We Ko Pa Casino, Fort McDowell, Arizona	
1	Win	1-0	(France) Thomas NGassam	MD	4	21 November 2014	Salle des Fetes, Carouge, Switzerland	

== Kickboxing record ==
Kickboxing record
67 wins (47 KOs), 9 losses, 0 draws
Date	Result	Opponent	Event	Location	Method	Round	Time
2023-11-18	Win	(Albania) Qendrim Bajrami	MJM 17: Kongolo vs Bajrami	Martigny, Switzerland	Decision (unanimous)	5	3:00
For the IPCC World Welterweight (-77 kg) Championship.
2019-10-12	Loss	(Russia) Dmitry Menshikov	Glory 69: Düsseldorf	Düsseldorf, Germany	TKO (Doctor Stoppage)	2	2:59
2018-10-27	Win	(France) Abdallah Mabel	Fight Legend Geneva	Geneva, Switzerland	Decision (Unanimous)	3	3:00
2018-08-04	Loss	(France) Yohan Lidon	Fight Night Saint Tropez 6	Saint-Tropez, France	Decision (Unanimous)	5	3:00
For the WKN Oriental Rules Super Middleweight (-79.4 kg) World Championship.
2017-06-10	Win	(France) Yohan Lidon	Glory 42: Paris	Paris, France	Decision (unanimous)	3	3:00
2017-03-25	Loss	(France) Cedric Doumbe	Glory 39: Brussels	Brussels, Belgium	Decision (unanimous)	5	3:00
For the Glory Welterweight Championship.
2017-01-20	Win	(France) Karim Benmansour	Glory 37: Los Angeles, Final	Los Angeles, California, US	TKO (punches)	3	2:57
Wins the Glory Welterweight Contender Tournament.
2017-01-20	Win	(Russia) Konstantin Khuzin	Glory 37: Los Angeles, Semi Finals	Los Angeles, California, US	Decision (unanimous)	3	3:00
2016-06-25	Loss	(Suriname) Murthel Groenhart	Glory 31: Amsterdam, Final	Amsterdam, Netherlands	Decision (Unanimous)	3	3:00
For the Glory Welterweight Contender Tournament.
2016-06-25	Win	(Armenia) Harut Grigorian	Glory 31: Amsterdam, Semi Finals	Amsterdam, Netherlands	Decision (Split)	3	3:00
2016-04-16	Loss	(Netherlands) Nieky Holzken	Glory 29: Copenhagen	Copenhagen, Denmark	Decision (unanimous)	5	3:00
For the Glory Welterweight Championship.
2015-12-04	Win	(Armenia) Karapet Karapetyan	Glory 26: Amsterdam	Amsterdam, Netherlands	Decision (unanimous)	3	3:00
2015-11-06	Loss	(France) Karim Ghajji	Glory 25: Milan, Semi Finals	Monza, Italy	Decision (Majority)	3	3:00
2015-06-05	Win	(France) Cedric Doumbe	Glory 22: Lille	Lille, France	Decision (unanimous)	3	3:00
2014-10-25	Win	(England) Jamie Bates	SUPERKOMBAT World Grand Prix 2014 Final Elimination	Geneva, Switzerland	KO (spinning back fist/right flying knee)	3	
SUPERKOMBAT Light Heavyweight Championship Eliminator
2014-09-27	Win	(France) Cedric Doumbe	Jurafight	Delémont, Switzerland	Decision (unanimous)	5	
2014-08-04	Win	(Italy) Nicola Gallo	Fight Night Saint-Tropez II	Saint-Tropez, France	Decision	3	
2014-01-25	Loss	(Italy) Roberto Cocco	Thai Boxe Mania	Turin, Italy	Decision (split)	5	
For the WKN Intercontinental Super Middleweight Championship.
2013-12-14	Win	(Republic of Ireland) Aidan Brooks	KickMas 2013	Belfast, Northern Ireland	Decision	3	
2013-11-23	Loss	(France) Karim Benmansour	La 20ème Nuit des Champions	Marseilles, France	Decision	3	
2013-05-25	Win	(Germany) Peter Baumler	Nuit Des Sports De Combat	Geneva, Switzerland	KO	1	
Defends the WKN European Super Middleweight (-79.40 kg/175 lb) Championship.
2012-10-06	Win	(Slovenia) Miran Fabjan	Kick Boxing	Villars, Switzerland	Decision	5	
Wins the WKN European Super Middleweight (-79.40 kg/175 lb) Championship.
2012-08-18	Win	(Slovenia) Miran Fabjan	Admiral Markets Fight Night	Portorož, Slovenia	Decision	3	
2012-06-02	Win	(Poland) Sławomir Przypis	Nuit des Sports de Combat IX	Geneva, Switzerland	TKO	4	
2012-04-28	Win	(France) Malik Aliane	Le Banner Series Acte 1	Geneva, Switzerland	Decision	4	
2012-03-24	Win	(Italy) Davide Mosca	Oktagon 2012	Milan, Italy	TKO (corner stoppage)	3	
2011-11-26	Win	(Italy) Hicham Zentari	Fight Code: Rhinos Series	Geneva, Switzerland	TKO (Body Kick)	2	
Legend: Win Loss Draw/No contest Notes

== See also ==
- List of male kickboxers
- List of male boxers
