= Hôtel de Ville, Wattrelos =

Town hall in Wattrelos, France

Hôtel de Ville
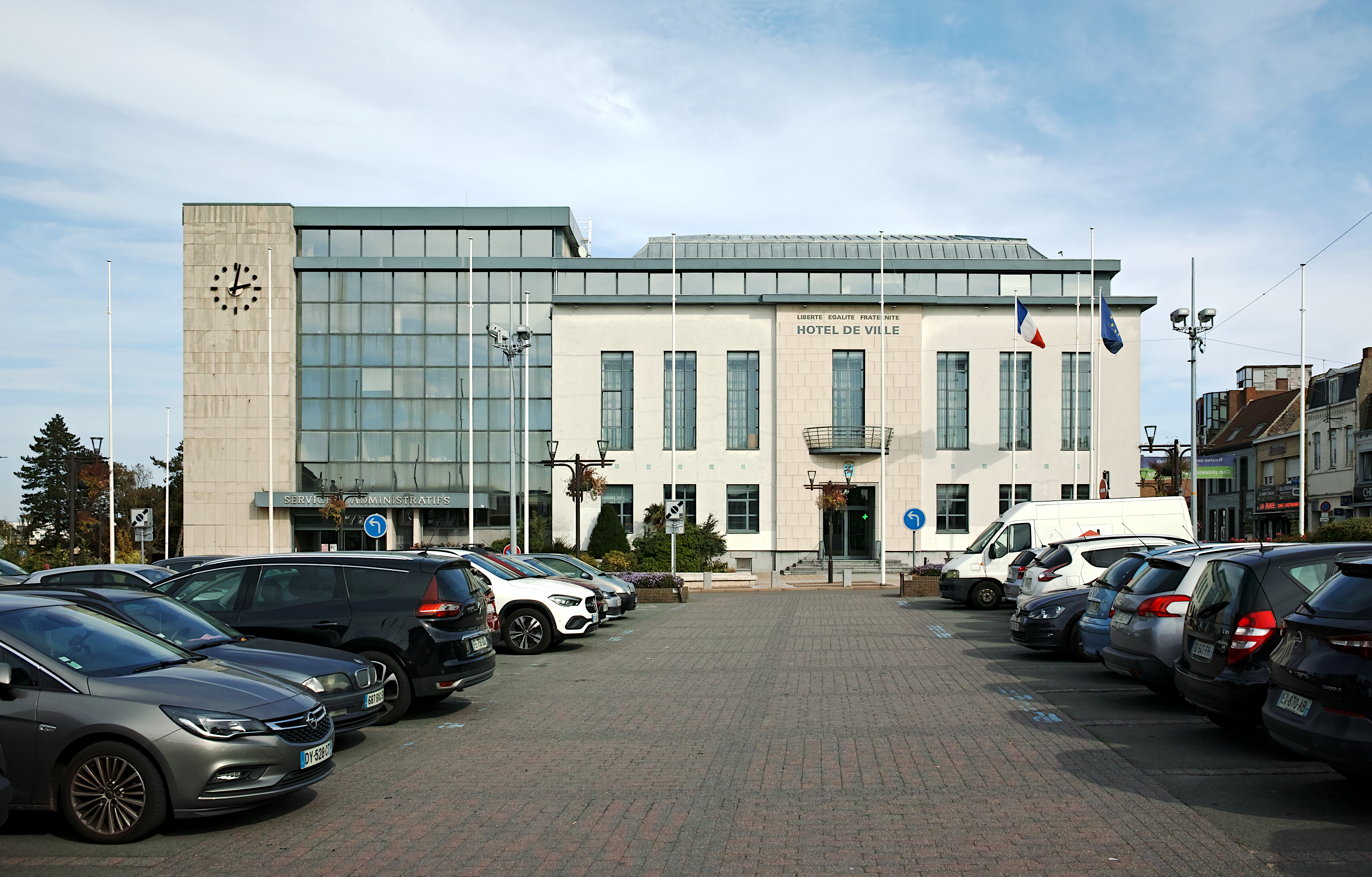
- The main frontage of the Hôtel de Ville in October 2023
- Interactive map of the Hôtel de Ville area

General information
- Type: City hall
- Architectural style: Modern style
- Location: Wattrelos, France
- Coordinates: 50.7017°N 3.2156°E
- Completed: c.1914

Design and construction
- Architect: Ernest Thibeau

The Hôtel de Ville (French pronunciation: [otɛl də vil], City Hall) is a municipal building in Wattrelos, Nord, in northern France, standing on Place Jean-Delvainquière.

== History ==
After the French Revolution, the new town council led by the mayor, Pierre-Joseph Lefèvre, looked for a building in which to hold their meetings. The building they selected was on the east side of what is now Rue Pierre Catteau. It was designed in the neoclassical style, built in stone and had been completed in 1721. The design involved a symmetrical main frontage of five bays facing onto Rue Pierre Catteau. The central bay featured a vehicle archway with a moulded surround on the ground floor, and a round headed window with a moulded surround and a keystone on the first floor. The other bays were fenestrated by segmental headed casement windows on both floors. The building operated as a venue hosting cabarets for much of the 18th century. It was acquired by the council for use as its first town hall in 1790. On the ground floor, the room on the left was subsequently used as the Salle du Conseil (council chamber), while the room on the right was used as the Salle des Mariages (wedding room).

In the mid-19th century, after the first town hall became too cramped, the council again looked for new building. The building they selected was an existing structure on Rue de Leers (now Rue Florimond Lecomte). The building was acquired by the council for use as its second town hall in 1867. It also accommodated the local school, police station and post office.

In the early 20th century, after finding the existing arrangements unsatisfactory, the council led by the mayor, Joseph Thérin, decided to commission a dedicated town hall. The site they selected was open land which had been vacated by the Church of the Holy Trinity, when it was demolished in 1884. The church had been badly damaged in 1566, when protestants took refuge there during the French Wars of Religion. Although repaired, it had subsequently become ruined and been succeeded by the Church of Saint-Maclou, which was erected to the west of the old church in the late 1870s.

The foundation stone for the new building was laid on 8 October 1911. It was designed in the neoclassical style, built in stone and was completed in around 1914. The design involved a symmetrical main frontage of seven bays facing onto what is now Place Jean-Delvainquière. The central bay featured a round headed doorway with a moulded surround and a keystone on the ground floor and a tri-partite window with a balstraded balcony on the first floor. Above the central bay, there was a clock tower surmounted by an ogee-shaped roof, a square section with louvers, a spire and a finial. The other bays were fenestrated by round headed windows with hood moulds and keystones on the ground floor and by square headed windows with hood moulds and keystones on the first floor. There were dormer windows at attic level and there was a round tower on the left side.

Following the liberation of the town by the French Resistance on 2 September 1944, during the Second World War, a local liberation committee led by a former member of the council, Jules Deldalle, took control of the town hall.

An extensive programme of works to modernise the complex was completed in 1968. A new office block, built in concrete and glass was erected on the left of the main structure. In addition, the clock tower and the tower on the left-hand side were removed, and the building was re-fenestrated in the modern style. Internally, although the layout was re-configured, the principal room remained the Salle du Conseil (council chamber).
