= 2015 in Glory =

Kickboxing events

Information
- First date: February 6
- Last date: December 4

Events
- Total events: 9

Fights

Chronology
| 2014 in Glory | 2015 in Glory | 2016 in Glory |

The year 2015 was the 4th year in the history of Glory, an international kickboxing promotion. 2015 starts with Glory 19: Virginia, and ends with Glory 26: Amsterdam. The events were broadcast through television agreements with Spike TV and other regional channels around the world.

== List of events ==
| # | Event Title | Date | Arena | Location |
|---|---|---|---|---|
| 1 | Glory 19: Virginia | February 6, 2015 | Hampton Coliseum | (United States) Hampton, Virginia, US |
| 2 | Glory 20: Dubai | April 3, 2015 | Dubai World Trade Centre | (United Arab Emirates) Dubai, UAE |
| 3 | Glory 21: San Diego | May 8, 2015 | Valley View Casino Center | (United States) San Diego, California, US |
| 4 | Glory 22: Lille | June 5, 2015 | Stade Pierre-Mauroy | Lille, France |
| 5 | Glory 23: Las Vegas | August 3, 2015 | Hard Rock Hotel and Casino | (United States) Las Vegas, Nevada, US |
| 6 | Bellator/Glory: Dynamite 1 | September 19, 2015 | SAP Center | (United States) San Jose, California, US |
| 7 | Glory 24: Denver | October 9, 2015 | Magness Arena | (United States) Denver, Colorado, US |
| 8 | Glory 25: Milan | November 6, 2015 | PalaIper | Milan, Italy |
| 9 | Glory 26: Amsterdam | December 4, 2015 | Amsterdam RAI | Amsterdam, Netherlands |

== Glory 19: Virginia ==
Glory 19: Virginia
- Promotion: Glory
- Date: February 6, 2015
- Venue: Hampton Coliseum
- City: (United States) Hampton, Virginia, US
- Attendance: 6,000

Event chronology
| Glory 18: Oklahoma | Glory 19: Virginia | Glory 20: Dubai |

Glory 19: Virginia was a kickboxing event held on February 6, 2015 at the Hampton Coliseum in Hampton, Virginia, US.

=== Background ===
The event was originally announced and scheduled to be held on December 19, 2014. However, in late November 2014, the promotion announced it would be delayed until February 2015.

This event featured world title fight for the Glory Heavyweight Championship of Rico Verhoeven vs. Errol Zimmerman as headliner and middleweight fight of Joe Schilling vs. Robert Thomas as co-headliner. Also this event featured 4-Man Welterweight Contender Tournament to earn a title shot for the Glory Welterweight Championship.

Glory 19 had average of 542,000 and peak of 825,000 viewers on Spike TV.

=== Results ===
Glory 19: Virginia
| Weight Class | | | | Method | Round | Time | Notes |
|---|---|---|---|---|---|---|---|
| Heavyweight 120 kg | (Netherlands) Rico Verhoeven (c) | def. | (Netherlands) Errol Zimmerman | TKO (knee injury) | 2 | 2:17 | For the Glory Heavyweight Championship |
| Welterweight 77 kg | (Netherlands) Nieky Holzken | def. | (United States) Raymond Daniels | TKO (punches) | 3 | 1:25 | Welterweight Contender Tournament Final |
| Middleweight 85 kg | (United States) Joe Schilling | def. | (Canada) Robert Thomas | Decision (unanimous) | 3 | 3:00 | |
| Light Heavyweight 95 kg | (United States) Cedric Smith | def. | (United States) James Hurley | TKO | 2 | 0:56 | |
| Welterweight 77 kg | (Netherlands) Nieky Holzken | def. | (Russia) Alexander Stetsurenko ^{1} | Decision (unanimous) | 3 | 3:00 | Welterweight Contender Tournament Semi-Finals |
| Welterweight 77 kg | (United States) Raymond Daniels | def. | (Brazil) Jonatan Oliveira | TKO (referee stoppage) | 2 | 2:15 | Welterweight Contender Tournament Semi-Finals |
Superfight Series
| Lightweight 70 kg | (Suriname) Andy Ristie | def. | (Australia) Steve Moxon | TKO (referee stoppage) | 1 | 2:43 | |
| Heavyweight 120 kg | (United States) Xavier Vigney | def. | (United States) Everett Sims | TKO | 1 | 1:44 | |
| Lightweight 70 kg | (Canada) Josh Jauncey | def. | (Germany) Max Baumert | TKO (doctor stoppage) | 3 | 0:37 | |
| Light Heavyweight 95 kg | (United States) Brian Collette | def. | (United States) Myron Dennis | Decision (unanimous) | 3 | 3:00 | |
| Welterweight 77 kg | (United States) Francois Ambang | def. | (United States) Stephen Richards | KO | 2 | 2:14 | |

^{1} Artur Kyshenko was replaced with Murthel Groenhart, and later Alexander Stetsurenko.

=== 2015 Glory Welterweight Contender Tournament bracket ===
Semi-finals
(United States) Raymond Daniels | TKO
(Brazil) Jonatan Oliveira | 2R.
(Netherlands) Nieky Holzken | DEC
(Russia) Alexander Stetsurenko | 3-0

Final
(United States) Raymond Daniels | 3R.
(Netherlands) Nieky Holzken | TKO

== Glory 20: Dubai ==
Glory 20: Dubai
- Promotion: Glory
- Date: April 3, 2015
- Venue: Dubai World Trade Centre
- City: (United Arab Emirates) Dubai, UAE
- Attendance: 2,125

Event chronology
| Glory 19: Virginia | Glory 20: Dubai | Glory 21: San Diego |

Glory 20: Dubai was a kickboxing event held on April 3, 2015 at the Dubai World Trade Centre in Dubai, UAE.

=== Background ===
This event featured two world title fights for the Glory Lightweight Championship of Robin van Roosmalen vs. Andy Ristie as headliner and inaugural Glory Featherweight Championship of Gabriel Varga vs. Mosab Amrani as co-headliner. Also this event featured 4-Man Middleweight Contender Tournament to earn a title shot for the Glory Middleweight Championship.

Glory 20 had average of 359,000 viewers on Spike TV.

=== Results ===
Glory 20: Dubai
| Weight Class | | | | Method | Round | Time | Notes |
|---|---|---|---|---|---|---|---|
| Lightweight 70 kg | (Netherlands) Robin van Roosmalen (c) | def. | (Suriname) Andy Ristie | Decision (unanimous) | 5 | 3:00 | For the Glory Lightweight Championship |
| Middleweight 85 kg | (Canada) Simon Marcus | def. | (Netherlands) Jason Wilnis | Decision (split) | 3 | 3:00 | Middleweight Contender Tournament Final |
| Featherweight 65 kg | (Canada) Gabriel Varga | def. | (Morocco) Mosab Amrani | Decision (unanimous) | 5 | 3:00 | For the Glory Featherweight Championship |
| Middleweight 85 kg | (Netherlands) Jason Wilnis | def. | (Brazil) Alex Pereira | Decision (unanimous) | 3 | 3:00 | Middleweight Contender Tournament Semi-Finals |
| Middleweight 85 kg | (Canada) Simon Marcus | def. | (United States) Wayne Barrett | Decision (unanimous) | 3 | 3:00 | Middleweight Contender Tournament Semi-Finals |
Superfight Series
| Light Heavyweight 95 kg | (Brazil) Saulo Cavalari ^{1} | def. | (Russia) Artem Vakhitov | Decision (split) | 3 | 3:00 | |
| Heavyweight 120 kg | (Tunisia) Mourad Bouzidi | def. | (United States) Dustin Jacoby ^{2} | Decision (unanimous) | 3 | 3:00 | |
| Heavyweight 85 kg | (England) Chi Lewis Parry | def. | (South Korea) Yong Soo Park | KO | 1 | 0:25 | |
| Middleweight 85 kg | (Morocco) Samir Boukhidous | def. | (Russia) Mikhail Chalykh | TKO | 1 | 2:00 | |
| Welterweight 77 kg | (England) Chad Sugden | def. | (Turkey) Atakan Arslan | Decision (unanimous) | 3 | 3:00 | |
| Lightweight 70 kg | (Russia) Anatoly Moiseev | def. | (Germany) Max Baumert ^{3} | KO | 1 | 0:38 | |

^{1} Andrei Stoica was replaced with Saulo Cavalari.
^{2} Pat Barry was replaced with Dustin Jacoby.
^{3} Elias El Rayess was replaced with Max Baumert.

=== 2015 Glory Middleweight Contender Tournament bracket ===
Semi-finals
(Canada) Simon Marcus | DEC
(United States) Wayne Barrett | 3-0
(Netherlands) Jason Wilnis | DEC
(Brazil) Alex Pereira | 3-0

Final
(Canada) Simon Marcus | DEC
(Netherlands) Jason Wilnis | 2-1

== Glory 21: San Diego ==
Glory 21: San Diego
- Promotion: Glory
- Date: May 8, 2015
- Venue: Valley View Casino Center
- City: (United States) San Diego, California, US
- Attendance: 2,954

Event chronology
| Glory 20: Dubai | Glory 21: San Diego | Glory 22: Lille |

Glory 21: San Diego was a kickboxing event held on May 8, 2015 at the Valley View Casino Center in San Diego, California, US.

=== Background ===
This event featured world title fight for the Glory Middleweight Championship of Artem Levin vs. Simon Marcus as headliner. Also this event featured 4-Man Heavyweight Qualification Tournament which will grant the winner entry into the Glory Heavyweight Contender Tournament to be held later.

Glory 21 had average of 488,000 and peak of 797,000 viewers on Spike TV.

=== Results ===
Glory 21: San Diego
| Weight Class | | | | Method | Round | Time | Notes |
|---|---|---|---|---|---|---|---|
| Middleweight 85 kg | (Russia) Artem Levin (c) | draw | (Canada) Simon Marcus | Decision (majority) | 5 | 3:00 | For the Glory Middleweight Championship |
| Heavyweight 120 kg | (United States) Xavier Vigney | def. | (United Kingdom) Chi Lewis Parry | KO | 2 | 1:50 | Heavyweight Qualification Tournament Final |
| Welterweight 77 kg | (United States) Raymond Daniels | def. | (United States) Justin Baesman | KO | 1 | 0:51 | |
| Heavyweight 120 kg | (United Kingdom) Chi Lewis Parry | def. | (United States) Demoreo Dennis | KO | 1 | 1:40 | Heavyweight Qualification Tournament Semi-Finals |
| Heavyweight 120 kg | (United States) Xavier Vigney | def. | (United States) Maurice Jackson | KO | 1 | 1:32 | Heavyweight Qualification Tournament Semi-Finals |
Superfight Series
| Middleweight 85 kg | (United States) Mike Lemaire | def. | (United States) Casey Greene | Decision (unanimous) | 3 | 3:00 | |
| Lightweight 70 kg | (Georgia (country)) Giga Chikadze | def. | (Canada) Ken Tran | KO | 3 | 2:19 | |
| Heavyweight 120 kg | (United States) Maurice Greene | def. | (United States) Ashley Epps | KO | 1 | 2:12 | |
| Light Heavyweight 95 kg | (United States) Manny Mancha | def. | (United States) Andre Walker | KO | 3 | 0:19 | |
| Welterweight 77 kg | (United States) Omari Boyd | def. | (United States) Chris Carradus | Decision (majority) | 3 | 3:00 | |

=== 2015 Glory Heavyweight Qualification Tournament bracket ===
Semi-finals
(United States) Xavier Vigney | KO
(United States) Maurice Jackson | 1R.
(United States) Demoreo Dennis | 1R.
(United Kingdom) Chi Lewis Parry | KO

Final
(United States) Xavier Vigney | KO
(United Kingdom) Chi Lewis Parry | 2R.

== Glory 22: Lille ==
Glory 22: Lille
- Promotion: Glory
- Date: June 5, 2015
- Venue: Stade Pierre-Mauroy
- City: Lille, France
- Attendance: 5,000

Event chronology
| Glory 21: San Diego | Glory 22: Lille | Glory 23: Las Vegas |

Glory 22: Lille was a kickboxing event held on June 5, 2015 at the Stade Pierre-Mauroy in Lille, France.

=== Background ===
This event featured world title fight for the Glory Heavyweight Championship of Rico Verhoeven vs. Benjamin Adegbuyi as headliner and light heavyweight fight of Zack Mwekassa vs. Carlos Brooks. Also this event featured 4-Man Lightweight Contender Tournament to earn a title shot for the Glory Lightweight Championship.

Glory 22, started airing at 16:00 ET on Friday in the United States, had average of 152,000 on Spike TV.

=== Results ===
Glory 22: Lille
| Weight Class | | | | Method | Round | Time | Notes |
|---|---|---|---|---|---|---|---|
| Heavyweight 120 kg | (Netherlands) Rico Verhoeven (c) | def. | (Romania) Benjamin Adegbuyi | Decision (unanimous) | 5 | 3:00 | For the Glory Heavyweight Championship |
| Lightweight 70 kg | (Thailand) Sitthichai Sitsongpeenong | def. | (Canada) Josh Jauncey | Decision (unanimous) | 3 | 3:00 | Lightweight Contender Tournament Final |
| Light Heavyweight 95 kg | (Democratic Republic of the Congo) Zack Mwekassa | def. | (United States) Carlos Brooks | KO | 1 | 1:58 | |
| Lightweight 70 kg | (Canada) Josh Jauncey | def. | (France) Djimè Coulibaly^{1} | TKO | 3 | 2:59 | Lightweight Contender Tournament Semi-Finals |
| Lightweight 70 kg | (Thailand) Sitthichai Sitsongpeenong | def. | (Georgia (country)) Davit Kiria | KO | 2 | 2:09 | Lightweight Contender Tournament Semi-Finals |
Superfight Series
| Heavyweight 120 kg | (Morocco) Jamal Ben Saddik | def. | (Belgium) Mamoudou Keta^{2} | KO | 1 | 1:59 | |
| Light Heavyweight 95 kg | (Tunisia) Mourad Bouzidi | def. | (Belgium) Filip Verlinden | Decision (unanimous) | 3 | 3:00 | |
| Welterweight 77 kg | (Switzerland) Yoann Kongolo | def. | (France) Cédric Doumbé^{3} | Decision (unanimous) | 3 | 3:00 | |
| Lightweight 70 kg | (Ukraine) Serhiy Adamchuk^{4} | def. | (Armenia) Marat Grigorian | Decision (unanimous) | 3 | 3:00 | |
| Featherweight 65 kg | (United States) Shane Oblonsky | def. | (France) Thomas Adamandopoulos | Decision (unanimous) | 3 | 3:00 | |

^{1} Niclas Larsen was replaced with Crice Boussoukou, and later Djimè Coulibaly.
^{2} Freddy Kemayo was replaced with Mamoudou Keta.
^{3} Karim Ghajji was replaced with Cédric Doumbé.
^{4} Djimè Coulibaly was replaced with Serhiy Adamchuk.

=== 2015 Glory Lightweight Contender Tournament bracket ===
Semi-finals
(Georgia (country)) Davit Kiria | 2R.
(Thailand) Sitthichai | KO
(Canada) Josh Jauncey | TKO
(France) Djimè Coulibaly | 3R.

Final
(Thailand) Sitthichai | DEC
(Canada) Josh Jauncey | 3-0

== Glory 23: Las Vegas ==
Glory 23: Las Vegas
- Promotion: Glory
- Date: August 7, 2015
- Venue: Hard Rock Hotel and Casino
- City: (United States) Las Vegas, Nevada, US
- Attendance: 1,800

Event chronology
| Glory 22: Lille | Glory 23: Las Vegas | Bellator/Glory: Dynamite 1 |

Glory 23: Las Vegas was a kickboxing event held on August 7, 2015 at the Hard Rock Hotel and Casino in Las Vegas, Nevada, US.

=== Background ===
This event featured world title fight for the vacant Glory Welterweight Championship of Nieky Holzken vs. Raymond Daniels as headliner. Also this event featured 4-Man Middleweight Qualification Tournament for a chance to win a spot in the Glory Middleweight Contender Tournament to be held later.

Glory 23 had average of 295,000 viewers on Spike TV.

=== Results ===
Glory 23: Las Vegas
| Weight Class | | | | Method | Round | Time | Notes |
|---|---|---|---|---|---|---|---|
| Welterweight 77 kg | (Netherlands) Nieky Holzken | def. | (United States) Raymond Daniels | TKO (cut) | 3 | 1:36 | For the vacant Glory Welterweight Championship |
| Middleweight 85 kg | (United States) Dustin Jacoby | def. | (United States) Casey Greene | TKO (punches) | 2 | 1:19 | Middleweight Qualification Tournament Final |
| Heavyweight 120 kg | (United States) Xavier Vigney | def. | (United Kingdom) Daniel Sam | Decision (split) | 3 | 3:00 | |
| Middleweight 85 kg | (United States) Casey Greene | def. | (United States) Quinton O'Brien | Decision (unanimous) | 3 | 3:00 | Middleweight Qualification Tournament Semi-Finals |
| Middleweight 85 kg | (United States) Dustin Jacoby | def. | (United States) Ariel Sepulveda | KO (punches) | 1 | 2:59 | Middleweight Qualification Tournament Semi-Finals |
Superfight Series
| Heavyweight 120 kg | (Morocco) Jamal Ben Saddik | vs. | (Brazil) Anderson Silva | No Contest (overturned) | 3 | 2:55 | Originally a TKO win for Ben Saddik; overturned after he tested positive for at least one prohibited substance. |
| Middleweight 85 kg | (United States) Matt Baker | def. | (United States) Edward Hyman | Decision (unanimous) | 3 | 3:00 | |
| Welterweight 77 kg | (United Kingdom) Chad Sugden | def. | (Netherlands) Murthel Groenhart | Decision (split) | 3 | 3:00 | |
| Featherweight 65 kg | (Uzbekistan) Anvar Boynazarov | def. | (Georgia (country)) Giga Chikadze | Decision (split) | 3 | 3:00 | |

=== 2015 Glory Middleweight Qualification Tournament bracket ===
Semi-finals
(United States) Dustin Jacoby | KO
(United States) Ariel Sepulveda | 1R.
(United States) Casey Greene | DEC
(United States) Quinton O'Brien | 3-0

Final
(United States) Dustin Jacoby | TKO
(United States) Casey Greene | 2R.

== Bellator/Glory: Dynamite 1 ==
Bellator/Glory: Dynamite 1
- Promotion: Bellator MMA & Glory
- Date: September 19, 2015
- Venue: SAP Center
- City: San Jose, California, USA

=== Results ===
Dynamite 1
| Weight Class | | | | Method | Round | Time | Notes |
|---|---|---|---|---|---|---|---|
| MMA Light Heavyweight 93 kg | (England) Liam McGeary (c) | def. | (United States) Tito Ortiz | Submission (Inverted Triangle Choke) | 1 | 4:41 | For the Bellator Light Heavyweight Championship. |
| MMA Light Heavyweight 93 kg | (United States) Phil Davis | def. | (France) Francis Carmont | KO (Punches) | 1 | 2:15 | Bellator Light Heavyweight Tournament Final |
| KB Light Heavyweight 95 kg | (Brazil) Saulo Cavalari | def. | (Democratic Republic of the Congo) Zack Mwekassa | Decision (Majority) | 5 | 3:00 | For the vacant Glory Light Heavyweight Championship |
| MMA Lightweight 70 kg | (United States) Josh Thomson | def. | (United States) Mike Bronzoulis | Submission (Arm Triangle Choke) | 3 | 0:39 | |
| KB Catchweight 79 kg | (England) Paul Daley | def. | (United States) Fernando Gonzalez | Decision (Unanimous) | 3 | 3:00 | |
| KB Women's 57 kg | (United States) Keri Anne Taylor-Melendez | def. | (United States) Hadley Griffith | Decision (Unanimous) | 3 | 3:00 | |
| MMA Light Heavyweight 93 kg | (United States) Phil Davis | def. | (United States) Emanuel Newton | Submission (Kimura) | 1 | 4:39 | Bellator Light Heavyweight Tournament Semi-Finals |
| MMA Light Heavyweight 93 kg | (United States) Muhammed Lawal | def. | (England) Linton Vassell | Decision (Unanimous) | 2 | 5:00 | Bellator Light Heavyweight Tournament Semi-Finals |
Preliminary Card

== Glory 24: Denver ==
Glory 24: Denver
- Promotion: Glory
- Date: October 9, 2015
- Venue: Magness Arena
- City: (United States) Denver, Colorado, US

Event chronology
| Bellator/Glory: Dynamite 1 | Glory 24: Denver | Glory 25: Milan |

Glory 24: Denver was a kickboxing event held on October 9, 2015 at the Magness Arena in Denver, Colorado, US.

=== Background ===
This event featured a fight between Joe Schilling and Jason Wilnis as headliner with the winner expected to get a title shot against Glory Middleweight Champion Artem Levin.

This event also featured a 4-Man Heavyweight Contender Tournament to earn a shot at the Glory Heavyweight Championship.

This was the last GLORY event that aired on Spike and marked the end of the 2-year agreement with Spike.

=== Results ===
Glory 24: Denver
| Weight Class | | | | Method | Round | Time | Notes |
|---|---|---|---|---|---|---|---|
| Middleweight 85 kg | (United States) Joe Schilling | def. | (Netherlands) Jason Wilnis | TKO | 2 | 3:00 | |
| Heavyweight 120 kg | (Romania) Benjamin Adegbuyi | def. | (Netherlands) Jahfarr Wilnis | Decision (split) | 3 | 3:00 | Heavyweight Contender Tournament Final |
| Middleweight 85 kg | (United States) Dustin Jacoby | def. | (United States) Wayne Barrett | KO | 3 | 1:40 | |
| Heavyweight 120 kg | (Romania) Benjamin Adegbuyi | def. | (Croatia) Mladen Brestovac | TKO | 3 | 1:47 | Heavyweight Contender Tournament Semi-Finals |
| Heavyweight 120 kg | (Netherlands) Jahfarr Wilnis | def. | (Australia) Ben Edwards | TKO (2 knockdowns) | 2 | 1:36 | Heavyweight Contender Tournament Semi-Finals |
Superfight Series
| Middleweight 85 kg | (Canada) Robert Thomas | def. | (France) David Radeff | Decision (split) | 3 | 3:00 | |
| Welterweight 77 kg | (United States) Casey Greene | def. | (United States) Francois Ambang | KO | 2 | 1:38 | |
| Featherweight 65 kg | (United States) Kevin Vannostrand | def. | (United States) Justin Houghton | Decision (split) | 3 | 3:00 | |
| Heavyweight 120 kg | (United States) Jason Lee | def. | (United States) Steve Paprocki | KO | 2 | 2:59 | |
| Middleweight 85 kg | (United States) Zack Wells | def. | (United States) Chris Trammell | KO | 1 | 1:56 | |

=== 2015 Glory Heavyweight Contender Tournament bracket ===
Semi-finals
(Romania) Benjamin Adegbuyi | TKO
(Croatia) Mladen Brestovac | 3R.
(Australia) Ben Edwards | 2R.
(Netherlands) Jahfarr Wilnis | TKO

Final
(Romania) Benjamin Adegbuyi | DEC
(Netherlands) Jahfarr Wilnis | 2-1

== Glory 25: Milan ==
Glory 25: Milan
- Promotion: Glory
- Date: November 6, 2015
- Venue: PalaIper
- City: Milan, Italy

Event chronology
| Glory 24: Denver | Glory 25: Milan | Glory 26: Amsterdam |

Glory 25: Milan was a kickboxing event held on November 6, 2015 at the PalaIper in Milan, Italy.

=== Background ===
This event featured a title fight for the Glory Lightweight Championship between Robin van Roosmalen and Sitthichai Sitsongpeenong as headliner, a fight between Giorgio Petrosyan and Josh Jauncey as co-headliner, and a title fight for the Glory Featherweight Championship between Gabriel Varga and Serhiy Adamchuk in superfight series.

This event also featured a 4-Man Welterweight Contender Tournament to earn a shot at the Glory Welterweight Championship.

=== Results ===
Glory 25: Milan
| Weight Class | | | | Method | Round | Time | Notes |
|---|---|---|---|---|---|---|---|
| Lightweight 70 kg | (Netherlands) Robin van Roosmalen (c) | def. | (Thailand) Sitthichai Sitsongpeenong | Decision (unanimous) | 5 | 3:00 | For the Glory Lightweight Championship |
| Welterweight 77 kg | (Netherlands) Murthel Groenhart | def. | (France) Karim Ghajji | Decision (unanimous) | 3 | 3:00 | Welterweight Contender Tournament Final |
| Lightweight 70 kg | (Italy) Giorgio Petrosyan | def. | (Canada) Josh Jauncey | Decision (unanimous) | 3 | 3:00 | |
| Welterweight 77 kg | (France) Karim Ghajji | def. | (Switzerland) Yoann Kongolo | Decision (majority) | 3 | 3:00 | Welterweight Contender Tournament Semi-Finals |
| Welterweight 77 kg | (Netherlands) Murthel Groenhart | def. | (Italy) Nicola Gallo | TKO (cut) | 2 | 1:03 | Welterweight Contender Tournament Semi-Finals |
Superfight Series
| Featherweight 65 kg | (Ukraine) Serhiy Adamchuk | def. | (Canada) Gabriel Varga (c) | Decision (unanimous) | 5 | 3:00 | For the Glory Featherweight Championship |
| Light Heavyweight 95 kg | (Russia) Artem Vakhitov | def. | (Germany) Danyo Ilunga | Decision (unanimous) | 3 | 3:00 | |
| Middleweight 85 kg | (Italy) Vittorio Iermano | def. | (Morocco) Samir Boukhidous | TKO | 2 | 2:30 | |
| Welterweight 77 kg | (Italy) Stefano Bruno | def. | (Italy) Hosam Radwan | TKO | 2 | 2:37 | Welterweight Contender Tournament Reserve Match |
| Lightweight 70 kg | (Russia) Anatoly Moiseev | def. | (Croatia) Teo Mikelić | Decision (unanimous) | 3 | 3:00 | |

=== 2015 Glory Welterweight Contender Tournament bracket ===
Semi-finals
(Netherlands) Murthel Groenhart | TKO
(Italy) Nicola Gallo | 2R.
(Switzerland) Yoann Kongolo | 2-0
(France) Karim Ghajji | DEC

Final
(Netherlands) Murthel Groenhart | DEC
(France) Karim Ghajji | 3-0

=== International broadcasting ===
| Country | Broadcaster |
|---|---|
| Bulgaria | Ring |
| Croatia | Fight Channel |
| France | Kombat Sport |
| Hungary | Digi Sport 2 |
| Netherlands | Spike |
| New Zealand | Sky Sport |
| Portugal | Sport TV |
| Romania | Digi Sport 1 |
| Russia | Combat Channel |
| South Africa | StarTimes |
| South Korea | KBS N |
| Suriname | ATV |
| United States | ESPN3 |

== Glory 26: Amsterdam ==
Glory 26: Amsterdam
- Promotion: Glory
- Date: December 4, 2015
- Venue: Amsterdam RAI
- City: Amsterdam, Netherlands
- Attendance: 9,000

Event chronology
| Glory 25: Milan | Glory 26: Amsterdam | Glory 27: Chicago |

Glory 26: Amsterdam was a kickboxing event held on December 4, 2015 at the Amsterdam RAI in Amsterdam, Netherlands.

=== Background ===
This event featured a two title fights for the Glory Welterweight Championship between Nieky Holzken and Murthel Groenhart as headliner, and for the Glory Heavyweight Championship between Rico Verhoeven and Benjamin Adegbuyi as co-headliner.

This event also featured a 4-Man Featherweight Contender Tournament to earn a shot at the Glory Featherweight Championship.

=== Results ===
Glory 26: Amsterdam
| Weight Class | | | | Method | Round | Time | Notes |
|---|---|---|---|---|---|---|---|
| Welterweight 77 kg | (Netherlands) Nieky Holzken (c) | def. | (Netherlands) Murthel Groenhart | Decision (Split) | 5 | 3:00 | For the Glory Welterweight Championship |
| Featherweight 65 kg | (Morocco) Mosab Amrani | def. | (Brazil) Maykol Yurk | KO (Liver Kick) | 1 | 1:51 | Featherweight Contender Tournament Final |
| Heavyweight 120 kg | (Netherlands) Rico Verhoeven (c) | def. | (Romania) Benjamin Adegbuyi | KO (Punch) | 1 | 2:12 | For the Glory Heavyweight Championship |
| Featherweight 65 kg | (Morocco) Mosab Amrani | def. | (South Korea) Lim Chi-bin | TKO (2 Knockdowns) | 1 | 1:32 | Featherweight Contender Tournament Semi-Finals |
| Featherweight 65 kg | (Brazil) Maykol Yurk | def. | (United States) Shane Oblonsky | TKO (2 Knockdowns) | 2 | 1:30 | Featherweight Contender Tournament Semi-Finals |
Superfight Series
| Heavyweight 120 kg | (Belgium) Thomas Vanneste | def. | (Netherlands) Errol Zimmerman | Decision (Split) | 3 | 3:00 | |
| Light Heavyweight 95 kg | (Tunisia) Mourad Bouzidi | def. | (Germany) Danyo Ilunga | Decision (Split) | 3 | 3:00 | |
| Light Heavyweight 95 kg | (France) Zinedine Hameur-Lain | def. | (Netherlands) Fred Sikking | Decision (Unanimous) | 3 | 3:00 | |
| Welterweight 77 kg | (Switzerland) Yoann Kongolo | def. | (Armenia) Karapet Karapetyan | Decision (Unanimous) | 3 | 3:00 | |
| Lightweight 70 kg | (Azerbaijan) Parviz Abdullayev | def. | (Morocco) Aziz Kallah | Decision (Unanimous) | 3 | 3:00 | |

=== 2015 Glory Featherweight Contender Tournament bracket ===
Semi-finals
(Morocco) Mosab Amrani | TKO
(South Korea) Lim Chi-bin | 1R.
(United States) Shane Oblonsky | 2R.
(Brazil) Maykol Yurk | TKO

Final
(Morocco) Mosab Amrani | KO
(Brazil) Maykol Yurk | 1R.

== See also ==
- 2015 in K-1
- 2015 in Kunlun Fight
