= Monza Arena =

Sports arena in Monza, Italy

OpiquadArena
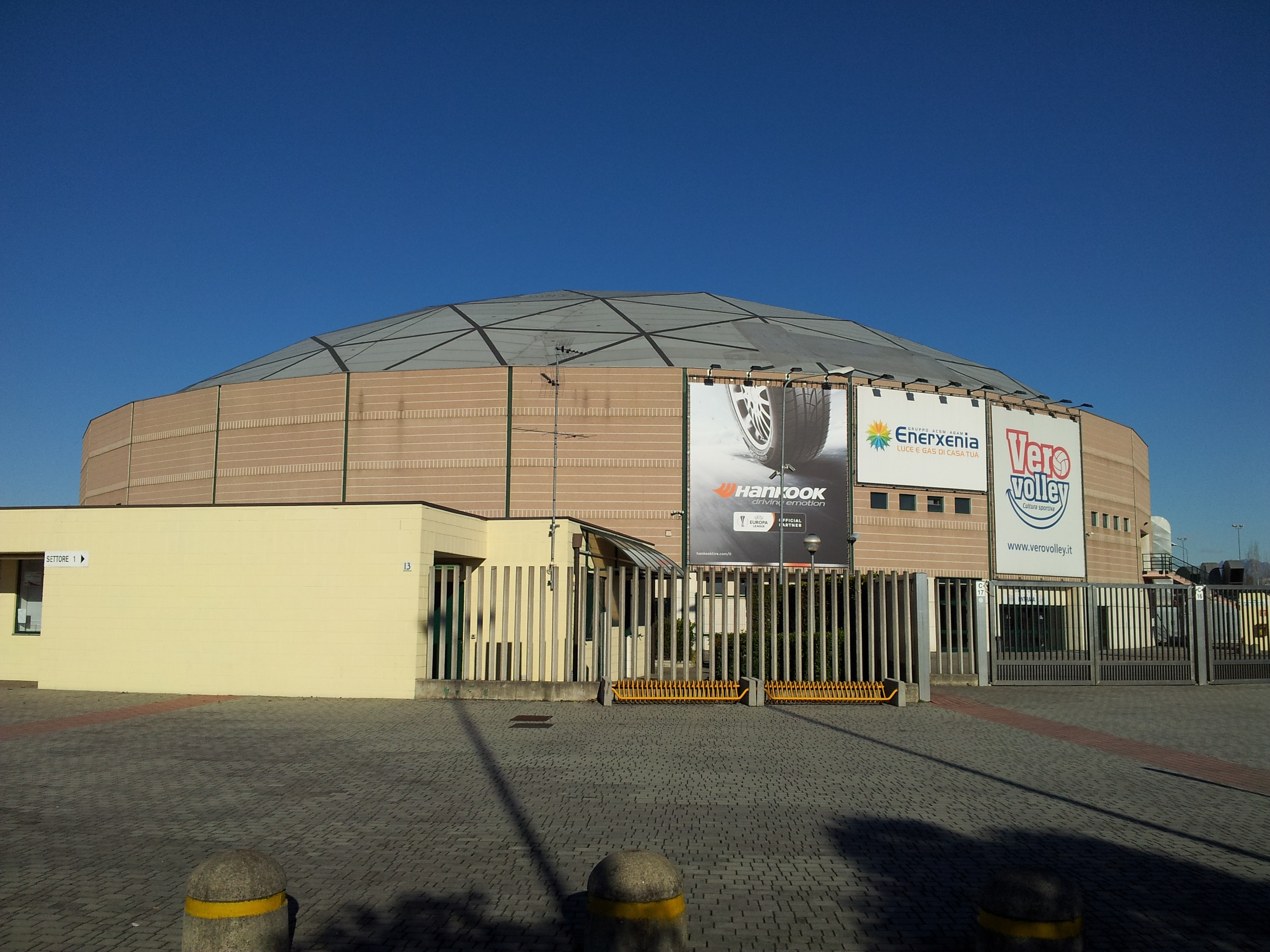
- Interactive map of OpiquadArena
- Former names: PalaCandy, PalaIper
- Location: Monza, Italy
- Coordinates: 45°35′7.52″N 9°18′32.95″E
- Capacity: 4,500

Construction
- Opened: 2003

Tenants
- Vero Volley Monza; Saugella Team Monza; Acqua Paradiso Monza Brianza (2009-2012)

The Arena di Monza, known for sponsorship reasons as the OpiquadArena since October 2023 (formerly the Candy Arena, PalaCandy, PalaIper), is an indoor sporting arena in Monza, Italy. It is home to the Vero Volley Monza (Serie A1) and Saugella Team Monza (Serie A1), volleyball teams. In 2011, it hosted matches for the 2011 Women's European Volleyball Championship. A few rounds of the Men's Volleyball World League were played in the arena in 2008. Its seating capacity is 4,500 spectators.

Preceded by SEG Geneva Arena; Geneva	SUPERKOMBAT World Grand Prix 2014 Final; Venue; 2014	Succeeded by Sala Sporturilor Olimpia; Ploiești
Preceded by Magness Arena; Denver	Glory 25: Milan; Venue; 2015	Succeeded by Amsterdam RAI; Amsterdam
