= Wattrelos =

- Commune
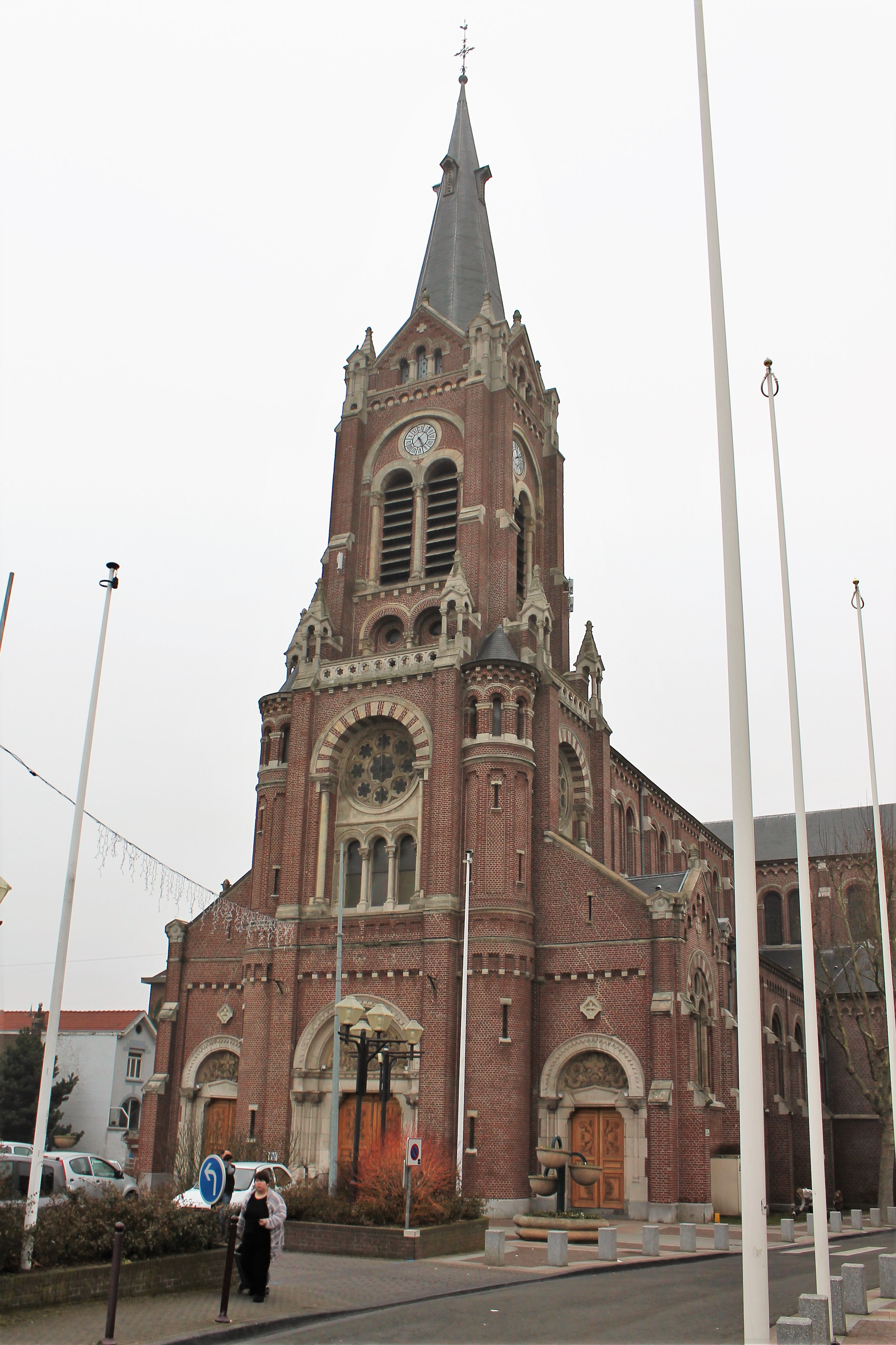
- The church in Wattrelos

- Coat of arms
- Location of Wattrelos
- Location within France Location within Hauts-de-France
- Coordinates: 50°42′00″N 3°13′01″E
- Country: France
- Region: Hauts-de-France
- Department: Nord
- Arrondissement: Lille
- Canton: Roubaix-2
- Intercommunality: Métropole Européenne de Lille

Government
  - Mayor (2020–2026): Dominique Baert
- Area^{1}: 13.44 km^{2} (5.19 sq mi)
- Elevation: 29 m (95 ft)
- Population (2023): 40,847
  - Density: 3,039/km^{2} (7,872/sq mi)
- Time zone: UTC+01:00 (CET)
  - Summer (DST): UTC+02:00 (CEST)
- INSEE/Postal code: 59650 /59150
- ^{1} French Land Register data, which excludes lakes, ponds, glaciers > 1 km^{2} (0.386 sq mi or 247 acres) and river estuaries.

Wattrelos (French pronunciation: [watʁəlo]; archaic Dutch: Waterlo) is a commune in the Nord department in the Hauts-de-France region of northern France. It is located on the border with Belgium, northeast of the city of Lille. The fifth-largest component of the Métropole Européenne de Lille, Wattrelos borders the communes of Roubaix, Tourcoing and Leers in France and the communes of Mouscron and Estaimpuis in Belgium.

== History ==
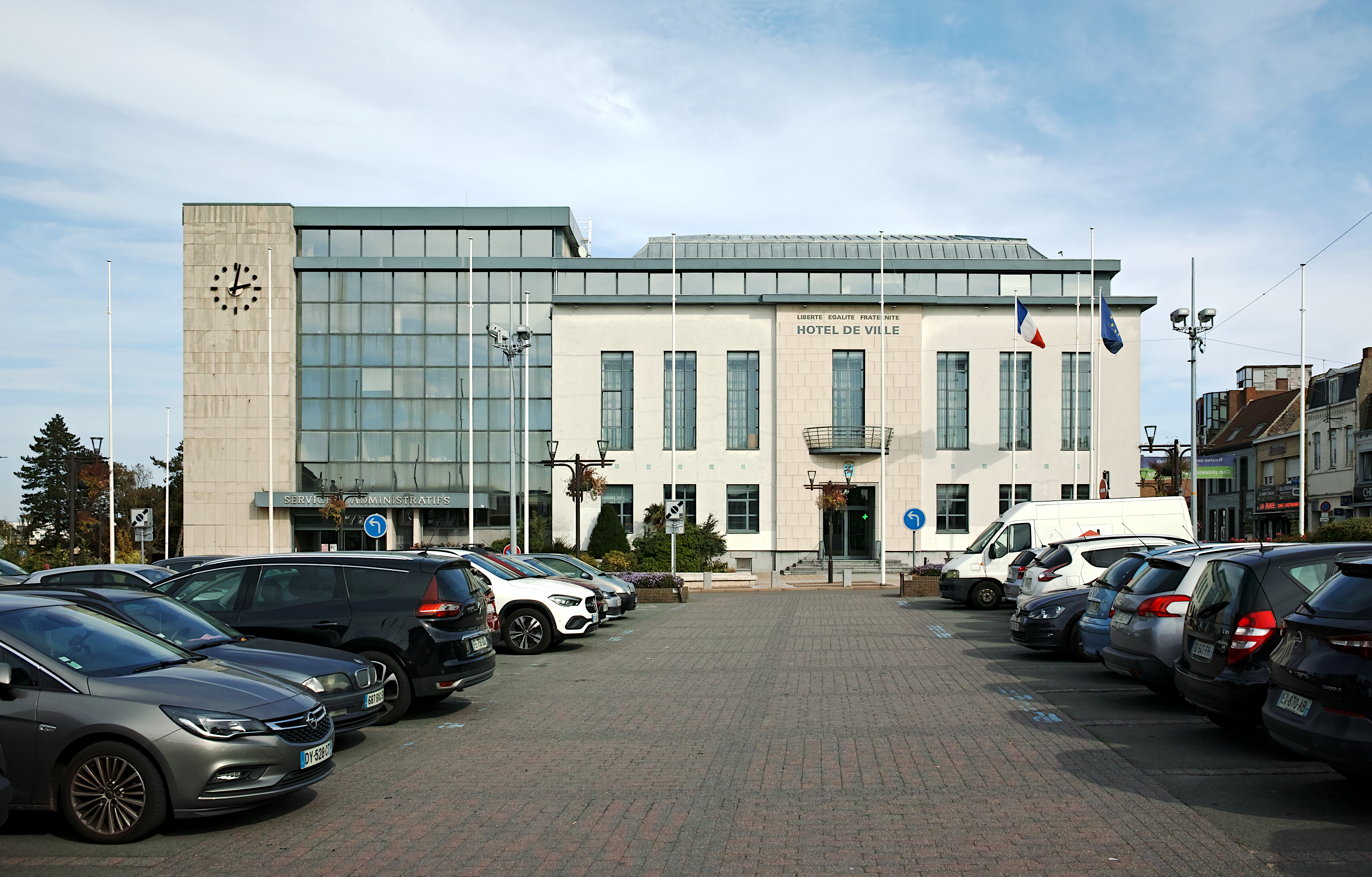
The Hôtel de Ville

The Hôtel de Ville was completed around 1914 and the façade was modernised in 1968.

== Population ==
Historical population

Year	Pop.	±% p.a.
1793	3,590	—
1800	3,214	−1.57%
1806	3,969	+3.58%
1821	4,901	+1.42%
1831	6,791	+3.32%
1836	7,300	+1.46%
1841	7,864	+1.50%
1846	8,736	+2.13%
1851	9,432	+1.54%
1856	10,360	+1.89%
1861	12,315	+3.52%
1866	13,113	+1.26%
1872	14,682	+1.90%
1876	15,325	+1.08%
1881	15,725	+0.52%
1886	17,118	+1.71%
1891	19,770	+2.92%
1896	22,731	+2.83%
1901	25,884	+2.63%

Year	Pop.	±% p.a.
1906	27,503	+1.22%
1911	29,089	+1.13%
1921	27,733	−0.48%
1926	29,032	+0.92%
1931	30,647	+1.09%
1936	31,084	+0.28%
1946	28,796	−0.76%
1954	31,993	+1.32%
1962	41,319	+3.25%
1968	43,754	+0.96%
1975	45,440	+0.54%
1982	44,626	−0.26%
1990	43,675	−0.27%
1999	42,753	−0.24%
2007	42,077	−0.20%
2012	41,633	−0.21%
2017	40,958	−0.33%
2023	40,847	−0.05%

Source: EHESS and INSEE (1968-2023)

== Heraldry ==
Arms of Wattrelos	The arms of Wattrelos are blazoned : Azure, a lion barry argent and gules, armed, langued and crowned Or.

== Twin towns – sister cities ==
Wattrelos is twinned with:

- Eschweiler, Germany
- Guarda, Portugal
- Köthen, Germany
- Mohács, Hungary
- Siemianowice Śląskie, Poland
- Solca, Romania

== Notable people ==
- Madelyne Delcroix (born 1946) - aerobatics pilot
- Fétiche (born 1935) - vedette, model, autobiographer

== See also ==
- Communes of the Nord department
