= Jake Paul vs. Cédric Doumbé =

2026 professional crossover boxing match

An MVP Christmas Eve Special
- Date: 24 December 2026
- Venue: Coca-Cola Arena, Dubai, UAE

Tale of the tape
Boxer	Jake Paul	Cédric Doumbé
Nickname	"The Problem Child"	Le Meilleur ("The Best")
Hometown	Cleveland, Ohio, US	Douala, Cameroon
Pre-fight record	12–2 (7 KOs)	1–0 (Boxing); 63–7–1 (41 KOs) (Kickboxing)
Age	29	34
Height	6 ft 1 in (1.85 m)	5 ft 8 in (1.73 m)
Style	Orthodox	Orthodox
Recognition		Former two-time Glory Welterweight Champion

Jake Paul vs. Cédric Doumbé, billed as An MVP Christmas Eve Special, is an upcoming professional boxing match contested between YouTuber-turned-professional boxer Jake Paul and former kickboxer Cédric Doumbé. The bout is scheduled to take place on 24 December 2026 at the Coca-Cola Arena in Dubai, UAE.

== Background & build-up ==
Following Jake Paul's knockout defeat to Anthony Joshua, there was doubt Paul would return following injuries he sustained. On 8 October 2026, Paul revealed a hitlist of potential opponents for his return, which included: Canelo Álvarez, Francis Ngannou, Conor McGregor, Darren Till, Ryan Garcia, KSI, and the winner between Tyson Fury and Joshua.

On 19 October 2026, Most Valuable Promotions announced Paul's return would take place on Christmas Eve in Dubai, UAE. On 2 November, French former kickboxer Cédric Doumbé was announced as Paul's opponent in an eight round bout at cruiserweight, using 10oz gloves.

Paul pledged that he would retire from professional boxing if he was to lose the fight. On choosing Doumbé as his opponent, Paul said, "Cédric has been in there with killers his whole career. He's a two-time world champion and he's not scared of anybody..." He added, "If he wins, I will hang up the gloves and call it a day, but if he loses, the man who calls himself 'The Best' just got beaten up by a YouTuber with a titanium jaw." Paul then gave his prediction for the fight, saying, "So Cédric Doumbé, I, Jake Joseph Paul, will knock you out, embarrass you and defeat you on Christmas Eve. This fight is not going the distance and someone is getting put to sleep in the Middle East and it's not Santa."

== Card ==
Weight class		vs		Method	Round	Time	Notes
Main Card (PPV)
Cruiserweight	Jake Paul	vs.	Cédric Doumbé		– (8)
Super middleweight	Chantelle Cameron	vs.	Mikaela Mayer		– (12)		^{Note 2}
Heavyweight	Alistair Overeem	vs.	Jimi Manuwa		– (6)		^{Note 3}
Lightweight	Jahmal Harvey	vs.	Craig Morgan		– (8)

^Note 1 For WBO, WBA and WBC female super welterweight titles.
^Note 3 Overeem's professional debut
