= Leers =

- Commune
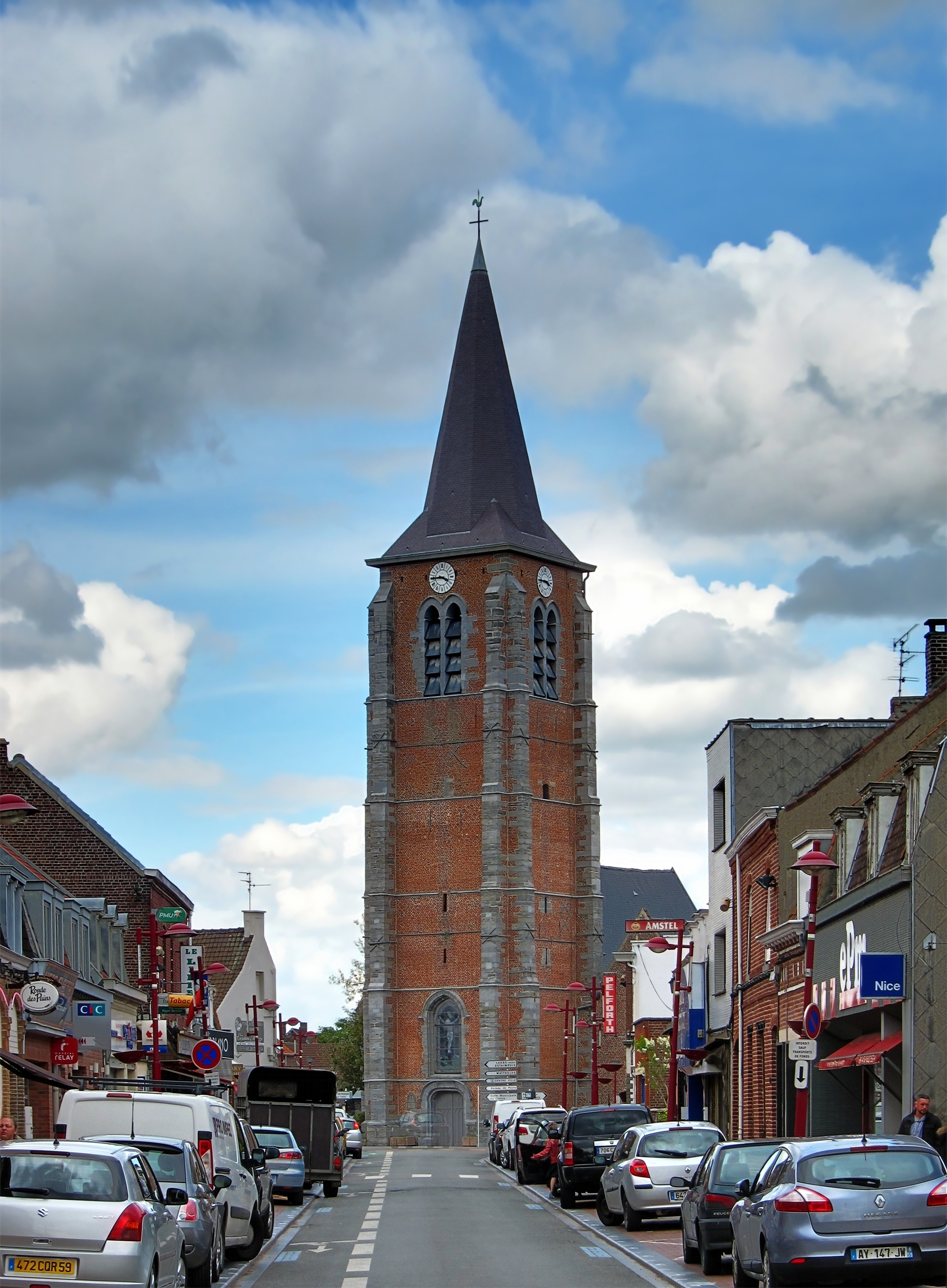
- The church in Leers

- Coat of arms
- Location of Leers
- Location within France Location within Hauts-de-France
- Coordinates: 50°40′57″N 3°14′41″E
- Country: France
- Region: Hauts-de-France
- Department: Nord
- Arrondissement: Lille
- Canton: Roubaix-2
- Intercommunality: Métropole Européenne de Lille

Government
  - Mayor (2020–2026): Rafa Godefroy
- Area^{1}: 5.4 km^{2} (2.1 sq mi)
- Elevation: 37 m (121 ft)
- Highest elevation: 37 m (121 ft)
- Lowest elevation: 16 m (52 ft)
- Population (2023): 9,521
  - Density: 1,800/km^{2} (4,600/sq mi)
- Time zone: UTC+01:00 (CET)
  - Summer (DST): UTC+02:00 (CEST)
- INSEE/Postal code: 59339 /59115
- ^{1} French Land Register data, which excludes lakes, ponds, glaciers > 1 km^{2} (0.386 sq mi or 247 acres) and river estuaries.

Leers (French pronunciation: [lɛʁs], Dutch: [leːrs]) is a commune in the Nord department in northern France.

It is part of the Métropole Européenne de Lille, and is about 15 km (9.3 mi) northeast of Lille.

== Population ==
Historical population
| Year | Pop. | ±% p.a. |
|---|---|---|
| 1968 | 5,848 | — |
| 1975 | 7,788 | +4.18% |
| 1982 | 8,558 | +1.36% |
| 1990 | 9,627 | +1.48% |
| 1999 | 9,651 | +0.03% |
| 2007 | 9,240 | −0.54% |
| 2012 | 9,400 | +0.34% |
| 2017 | 9,473 | +0.15% |
| 2023 | 9,521 | +0.08% |
Source: INSEE

== Heraldry ==
| Arms of Leers | The arms of Leers are blazoned : Sable, 4 keys argent. (Leers and Saint-Pierre-Brouck use the same arms.) |

== See also ==
- Communes of the Nord department
