= 2027 in Glory =

Kickboxing events

Information
- First date: January 16, 2027

The year 2027 is the 16th year in the history of Glory, an international kickboxing promotion.

The numbered Glory events are broadcast on various services such as Triller TV, KIJK, CSN, Go3 and Pro Arena.

== List of events ==
| # | Event Title | Date | Arena | Location |
|---|---|---|---|---|
| 1 | Glory Rivals 7 | January 16, 2027 | Topsportcentrum Almere | Almere, Netherlands |
| 2 | Glory 111 | February 6, 2027 | RTM Stage | Rotterdam, Netherlands |

== Glory Rivals 7 ==
Glory Rivals 7
- Promotion: Glory
- Date: January 16, 2027
- Venue: Topsportcentrum Almere
- City: Almere, Netherlands

Glory Rivals 7 is a kickboxing event produced by Glory and Enfusion that will take place in January 16, 2027, in Almere, Netherlands.

=== Background ===
The event marks the first of four announced Rivals events in collaboration with Enfusion that are set to happen in 2027.

=== Fight card ===
Glory Rivals 7
| Weight Class | | | | Method | Round | Time | Notes |
|---|---|---|---|---|---|---|---|
| Catchweight 72.5 kg | (Morocco) Younes Smaili | vs. | (Morocco) Anouar Afakir | | | | |

== Glory 111 ==
Glory 111
- Promotion: Glory
- Date: February 6, 2027
- Venue: RTM Stage
- City: Rotterdam, Netherlands

Glory 111 is a kickboxing event produced by Glory that will take place on February 6, 2027, in Rotterdam, Netherlands.

=== Background ===
The event is headlined by Miguel Trindade defending his Glory Featherweight Championship in a trilogy fight against Berjan Peposhi.

=== Fight card ===
Glory 111
| Weight Class | | | | Method | Round | Time | Notes |
|---|---|---|---|---|---|---|---|
| Featherweight 65 kg | (Turkey) Deniz Demirkapu | vs. | (Albania) Berjan Peposhi | | | | |
| Middleweight 85 kg | (Turkey) Serkan Özçağlayan | vs. | (Republic of Ireland) Joshua Akingbade | | | | |
| Featherweight 65 kg | (Netherlands) Jan Kaffa | vs. | (Morocco) Mohamed Hamami | | | | |

== See also ==
- 2027 in ONE Championship
- 2027 in K-1
- 2027 in RISE
- 2027 in Romanian kickboxing
- 2027 in Wu Lin Feng
