= Berjan Peposhi =

Albanian kickboxer

Berjan Anthony Peposhi
- Born: February 7, 2001 (age 25); Albania
- Nationality: Albanian; Belgian
- Height: 179 cm (5 ft 10 1/2 in)
- Weight: 65 kg (143 lb; 10 st)
- Style: Kickboxing
- Fighting out of: Brussels, Belgium
- Team: Team Valon (2023-Present); Napoli Gym (former)

Kickboxing record
- Total: 43
- Wins: 35
- By knockout: 17
- Losses: 8
- By knockout: 0

Berjan Peposhi (February 7, 2001) is an Albanian-Belgian kickboxer, currently competing in the featherweight division of Glory. As of June 2024, he is ranked as the tenth best super featherweight kickboxer in the world by Beyond Kickboxing.

== Career ==
=== Early career ===
Peposhi faced Prince Junior at Nuit des Titans on March 5, 2022. He won the fight by unanimous decision.

Peposhi faced Ilias Marghadi for the vacant WKN K-1 World 65 kg title at NKM Fight Night 9 on October 30, 2022. He won the fight by a second-round knockout.

=== Glory ===
Peposhi made his debut for the Glory Kickboxing promotion at Glory 83 against Ahmad Chikh Mousa on February 11, 2023. He lost the bout by unanimous decision after suffering a knockdown in the third round.

Peposhi faced the debuting Jan Kaffa at Glory 85 on April 29, 2023. He lost the fight by unanimous decision.

Peposhi faced Denis Wosik at Glory 88 on September 9, 2023. He lost the fight by split decision.

Peposhi faced Glory newcomer Miguel Trindade at Glory 90 on December 23, 2023. He won the fight by split decision. Both competitors scored knockdowns during the bout. Their bout was in the shortlist for the 2023 Glory Fight of the Year award. He would actually win Fight of The Year for his bout with Ahmad Chikh Mousa.

Peposhi faced Mousa in a rematch at Glory 92 on May 18, 2024. He won win the bout via unanimous decision.

Peposhi faced Ayoub Bourass at Glory 94 on August 31, 2024. He won the bout via unanimous decision.

Peposhi faced Lee Sung-hyun in the Quarterfinals of the GLORY-RISE Featherweight Grand Prix on December 21, 2025. He lost the bout via majority decision, with both men scoring knockdowns.

Peposhi faced Deniz Demirkapu at Glory 100. He won the bout via unanimous decision.

Peposhi faced Aitor Currito at Glory 104 - Last Featherweight Standing Second Round. He won the bout via unanimous decision, qualifying him for the a spot in Quarterfinals.

== Titles and accomplishments ==
=== Professional ===
- Glory
  - 2023 Glory Fight of the Year (vs. Ahmad Chikh Mousa)
- International Sport Kickboxing Association
  - 2022 ISKA K-1 European -63.5 kg Champion
- World Kickboxing Network
  - 2022 WKN K-1 World -65 kg Champion
- World Sport Fight Martial Arts Council
  - 2019 WFMC Muay Thai European 64.5 kg Champion

=== Amateur ===
- International Federation of Muaythai Associations
  - 2019 IFMA World Championships U-23 -63.5 kg (silver)
  - 2020 Baltic Open -63.5 kg (gold)

== Fight record ==
Professional Kickboxing and Muay Thai Record
35 Wins (17 (T)KO's), 8 Losses, 0 Draw
Date	Result	Opponent	Event	Location	Method	Round	Time
2027-02-06		(Turkey) Deniz Demirkapu	Glory 111	Rotterdam, Netherlands			
2026-10-17	Win	(France) Jeremi Monteiro	Glory 110	Antwerp, Belgium	Decision (Unanimous)	3	3:00
2026-06-13	Loss	(Turkey) Deniz Demirkapu	Glory Collision 9	Rotterdam, Netherlands	Decision (Unanimous)	3	3:00
2026-03-28	Loss	(Portugal) Miguel Trindade	Glory 106 - Last Featherweight Standing Quarterfinals	Tokyo, Japan	Ext.R Decision (Unanimous)	4	3:00
2025-12-27	Loss	(Morocco) Yassine Mahssoun	Fight 4 Respect 11	Brussels, Belgium	Decision	3	3:00
2025-10-11	Win	(Spain) Aitor Currito	Glory 104 - Last Featherweight Standing Second Round	Rotterdam, Netherlands	Decision (Unanimous)	3	3:00
2025-06-14	Win	(Turkey) Deniz Demirkapu	Glory 100	Rotterdam, Netherlands	Decision (Unanimous)	3	3:00
2025-04-12	Win	(Algeria) Imran Ben Slama	Fight 4 Respect 10	Roosdaal, Belgium	KO (Right cross)	3	
2024-12-21	Loss	(South Korea) Lee Sung-hyun	GLORY RISE Featherweight Grand Prix, Quarterfinals	Chiba, Japan	Decision (Majority)	3	3:00
2024-09-21	Win	(France) Evan Gambuto	Fight 4 Respect	Brussels, Belgium	Decision (Unanimous)	3	3:00
2024-08-31	Win	(Morocco) Ayoub Bourass	Glory 94	Antwerp, Belgium	Decision (Unanimous)	3	3:00
2024-05-18	Win	(Germany) Ahmad Chikh Mousa	Glory 92	Rotterdam, Netherlands	Decision (Unanimous)	3	3:00
2024-03-03	Win	(Czech Republic) Denis Hdinek	Fight for Honor II	Brussels, Belgium	Decision (Unanimous)	3	3:00
2023-12-23	Win	(Portugal) Miguel Trindade	Glory 90	Rotterdam, Netherlands	Decision (Split)	3	3:00
2023-09-09	Loss	(Germany) Denis Wosik	Glory 88	Paris, France	Decision (Split)	3	3:00
2023-07-22	Win	(Spain) Eduardo Del Prado	Le Choc des Gladiateurs	Le Lavandou, France	Decision (Unanimous)	3	3:00
2023-04-29	Loss	(Netherlands) Jan Kaffa	Glory 85	Rotterdam, Netherlands	Decision (Unanimous)	3	3:00
2023-02-11	Loss	(Germany) Ahmad Chikh Mousa	Glory 83	Essen, Germany	Decision (Unanimous)	3	3:00
2022-11-12	Win	(Italy) Ivan Naccari	Alpha League 2	Brussels, Belgium	Decision (Unanimous)	3	3:00
2022-10-30	Win	(Netherlands) Ilias Marghadi	NKM Fight Night 9	Brussels, Belgium	KO (High kick)	2	
Wins the vacant WKN K-1 World 65kg title.
2022-07-09	Win	(Belgium) Sabri Ben Henia	Clash of Lake	La Balme-de-Sillingy, France	Decision (Unanimous)	3	3:00
2022-06-11	Win	(France) Mehdi Larbi	La Nuit de l'Impact VI	Saintes, France	KO (High kick)	1	
2022-05-22	Win	(Colombia) Juan Sit Vendetta	Alpha Fight League	Brussels, Belgium	KO (High kick)	3	
2022-03-26	Win	(Spain) Ignacio Menendez	Fight 4 Respect 4	Brussels, Belgium	Decision (Unanimous)	5	3:00
Wins the vacant ISKA K-1 European 63.5kg title.
2022-03-05	Win	(Luxembourg) Prince Junior	La Nuit des Titans	Tours, France	Decision (Unanimous)	3	3:00
2021-12-18	Win	(Morocco) Fouad Jebbari	TKR 4	Bezons, France	Decision (Unanimous)	3	3:00
2021-11-21	Win	(Italy) Jonathan Ivernino	EMP Fight Night	Brussels, Belgium	TKO (Corner stoppage)	1	1:22
2021-10-02	Win	(Italy) Achraf Aasila	Empire Fight	Montbéliard, France	TKO (Corner stoppage)	2	
2021-09-04	Win	(France) Lorenzo Sammartino	Phenix Boxing Only 8	Saint-Julien-en-Genevois, France	Decision	5	3:00
2021-08-21	Win	(France) Youssef Ouattara	Fight Time	Zurich, Swiss	KO (Left hook to the body)	3	
2021-07-04	Win	(Netherlands) Cwainy Sebregts	Enfusion #100	Alkmaar, Netherlands	KO (Left hook to the body)	2	2:07
2020-09-19	Loss	(Morocco) Faouzi El Kandoussi	Enfusion #97	Alkmaar, Netherlands	Decision (Unanimous)	3	3:00
2020-02-08	Win	(France) Mustapha Benshimed	MTK Fight Night 9	Charleroi, Belgium	KO (Knee to the head)	1	
2019-12-20	Win	(Belgium) Stéphane Candel	Sentower	Opglabbeek, Belgium	Decision (Unanimous)	3	3:00
2019-11-23	Win	(Belgium) Erdem Tubadan	Fight Explosion 7	Hoeselt, Belgium	Decision	3	3:00
2019-11-17	Win	(Italy) Pasquale Amoroso	NKM Fight Night 8	Evere, Belgium	Decision	5	3:00
Wins the vacant WFMC European 64.5kg title.
2019-08-18	Win	(Thailand) Chakaj Singhadechagym	MAX Muay Thai	Pattaya, Thailand	TKO (Left hook)	2	
2019-08-11	Win	(Thailand)		Sisaket province, Thailand	KO (Body shots)	1	
2019-06-27	Win	(Thailand) Tengsong Chor Chatchai	MAX Muay Thai	Pattaya, Thailand	KO (Left hook to the body)	1	0:40
2019-06-01	Win	(France) Ismael Soltani	NKM Fight Night	Evere, Belgium	KO (Left hook to the body)	1	
2019-04-13	Win	(Belgium) Ougo Huet	Enfusion Live 82	Orchies, France	KO (Left hook to the body)	1	0:30
A-class debut.
2019-01-27	Win	(Belgium) Marwan Chagouani		Brussels, Belgium	Decision (Unanimous)	5	2:00
Wins Belgium B-class K-1 -63.5kg title.
2018-10-28	Win	(France) William Gomes	NKM Fight Night 3	Brussels, Belgium	Decision (Unanimous)	5	2:00
Wins WFMC European pro/am -63.5kg title.
Legend: Win Loss Draw/No contest Notes

Amateur Muay Thai Record
Date	Result	Opponent	Event	Location	Method	Round	Time
2020-02-02	Win	(Moldova) Ion Ungurean	Baltic Muaythai Open 2020, Final	Vilnius, Lithuania	Decision	3	3:00
Wins 2020 Baltic Muaythai Open -63.5kg Gold Medal.
2020-02-01	Win	(Lithuania) Matas Pultaražinskas	Baltic Muaythai Open 2020, Semifinal	Vilnius, Lithuania	TKO (Doctor stoppage)	1	
2020-01-31	Win	(Belarus)	Baltic Muaythai Open 2020, Quarterfinal	Vilnius, Lithuania	KO	1	
2019-07-28	Loss	(Thailand) Krisada Takhiankliang	2019 IFMA World Championships, Final	Bangkok, Thailand	Decision (30:27)	3	3:00
Wins 2019 IFMA World Championship U-23 -63.5kg Silver Medal.
2019-07-27	Win	(Indonesia) Ardiansyah N A	2019 IFMA World Championships, Semifinal	Bangkok, Thailand	Decision (30:27)	3	3:00
2019-07-25	Win	(Malaysia) Mohamad Azeem Ismail	2019 IFMA World Championships, Quarterfinal	Bangkok, Thailand	Decision (30:27)	3	3:00
Legend: Win Loss Draw/No contest Notes

== See also ==
- List of male kickboxers
