= Joshua Akingbade =

Irish kickboxer

- Born: 2003 (age 22–23); Ireland
- Other names: Bad Boy
- Height: 188 cm (6 ft 2 in)
- Weight: 85 kg (187 lb; 13.4 st)
- Style: Muay Thai, Kickboxing
- Stance: Orthodox
- Fighting out of: Dublin, Ireland
- Team: Origins Muay Thai; Powerhouse Muay Thai

Kickboxing record
- Total: 19
- Wins: 18
- By knockout: 14
- Losses: 1
- By knockout: 0
- Draws: 0

Joshua Akingbade is an Irish-Nigerian kickboxer and Muay Thai fighter.

As of July 2026, Akingbade was ranked as the fifth best middleweight in the world by Beyond Kickboxing.

== Career ==
=== Early career ===
On April 25, 2026, Akingbade entered a 4-man tournament at Battle of Barock V in Fulda, Germany. In the semifinals he defeated Sergej Braun by unanimous decision. In the final he defeated Brice Kombou by unanimous decision.

Akingbade was scheduled to take part in an 8-man one-night Grand Prix at SENSHI 32 on July 11, 2026, in Varna, Bulgaria. In the quarterfinals he defeated local champion Ali Yuzeir by unanimous decision. In the semifinals he stopped Ulric Bokeme in the first round with punches before knocking out Fabian Lorito with a second-round body kick in the finals and winning the Senshi Middleweight Grand Prix.

=== Glory ===
Akingbade made his debut for the Glory promotion at the Glory 110 against Alex Fernandez. He won by a second-round TKO, after Fernandez's corner was forced to throw in the towel.

== Championships and accomplishments ==
=== Muay Thai ===
- International Sport Kickboxing Association
  - 2025 ISKA Muay Thai Ireland Light Heavyweight (81.5 kg) Champion
  - 2025 ISKA Muay Thai Ireland Light Cruiserweight (85 kg) Champion
  - 2025 ISKA Muay Thai 4 Nations Light Heavyweight (81.5 kg) Champion
    - One successful title defense

=== Kickboxing ===
- Battle of Barock
  - 2026 Battle of Barock (-85 kg) 4-Man Tournament Winner
- SENSHI
  - 2026 SENSHI Middleweight (-85 kg) Grand Prix Winner

== Muay Thai and Kickboxing record ==
Muay Thai and Kickboxing record
18 Wins (14 (T)KO's), 1 Loss, 0 Draws
Date	Result	Opponent	Event	Location	Method	Round	Time
2027-02-06		(Turkey) Serkan Özçağlayan	Glory 111	Rotterdam, Netherlands			
2026-10-17	Win	(Spain) Alex Fernandez	Glory 110	Antwerp, Belgium	TKO (Corner stoppage)	2	3:00
2026-07-11	Win	(Switzerland) Fabian Lorito	Senshi 32 - Middleweight Grand Prix, Final	Varna, Bulgaria	KO (Body kick)	2	2:02
Wins the 2026 SENSHI Middleweight (-85 kg) Grand Prix.
2026-07-11	Win	(Democratic Republic of the Congo) Ulric Bokeme	Senshi 32 - Middleweight Grand Prix, Semifinals	Varna, Bulgaria	TKO (Punches)	1	1:32
2026-07-11	Win	(Bulgaria) Ali Yuzeir	Senshi 32 - Middleweight Grand Prix, Quarterfinals	Varna, Bulgaria	Decision (Unanimous)	3	3:00
2026-04-25	Win	(Cameroon) Brice Kombou	Battle of Barock V, Final	Fulda, Germany	Decision (Unanimous)	3	3:00
Wins the Battle of Barock 4-Man Tournament.
2026-04-25	Win	(Germany) Sergej Braun	Battle of Barock V, Semifinals	Fulda, Germany	Decision (Unanimous)	3	3:00
2025-11-09	Win	(United Kingdom) Charlie Pierce	Capital 1	Dublin, Ireland	KO (Straight to the body)	1	
Defended the ISKA Muay Thai 4 Nations Light Heavyweight (81.5kg) title.
2025-09-06	Win	(United Kingdom) Joshua Flanagan	Leapfrog Fight Night 9	Bolton, England	KO (Left hook)	1	
Wins the ISKA Muay Thai 4 Nations Light Heavyweight (81.5kg) title.
2025-06-14	Win	(Republic of Ireland) Liam Devaney	Capital 1: Origins Edition	Dublin, Ireland	KO (Left hook)	1	0:40
Defended the ISKA Muay Thai Ireland Light Cruiserweight (85kg) title.
2025-04-12	Win	(Republic of Ireland) Brian Houston	Langka Muay Thai presents: Deliverance	Belfast, Ireland	TKO (Elbow and high kick)	2	
Wins the ISKA Muay Thai Ireland Light Heavyweight (81.5kg) title.
2024-11-23	Win	(United Kingdom) Joshua Harris	Leodis Fight Night	Leeds, England	KO (Right cross)	2	
2024-10-05	Win	(Scotland) David Russell	Siam Warriors Superfights	Cork, Ireland	KO (Left high kick)	2	3:00
2024-05-31	Win	(Russia) Shaaman Debziev	Bangla Stadium	Phuket, Thailand	KO		
2024-05-	Win	(Thailand)	Bangla Stadium	Phuket, Thailand	KO (Right cross)		
2024-05-	Win		Bangla Stadium	Phuket, Thailand	KO (Punches)		
2024-04-07	Win	(Italy) Valerio Balestri	Siam Warriors 20th Anniversary Show	Cork, Ireland	Decision (Unanimous)	3	2:00
2024-01-27	Win	(Republic of Ireland) Steven Venter	309 Phuang Malai presents: Legends Return II	Dublin, Ireland	TKO (Left hook to the body)	1	1:36
2023-10-07	Win	(Republic of Ireland) Aaron O'Reilly	Siam Warriors Superfights	Cork, Ireland	TKO (Referee stoppage)	2	1:25
2023-05-27	Loss	(United Kingdom) Dariusz Treichel	Elite promotions	Birmingham, England	Decision (Split)	3	2:00
Legend: Win Loss Draw/No contest Notes

== See also ==
- List of male kickboxers
