= Mohammed Boutasaa =

Dutch-Moroccan kickboxer

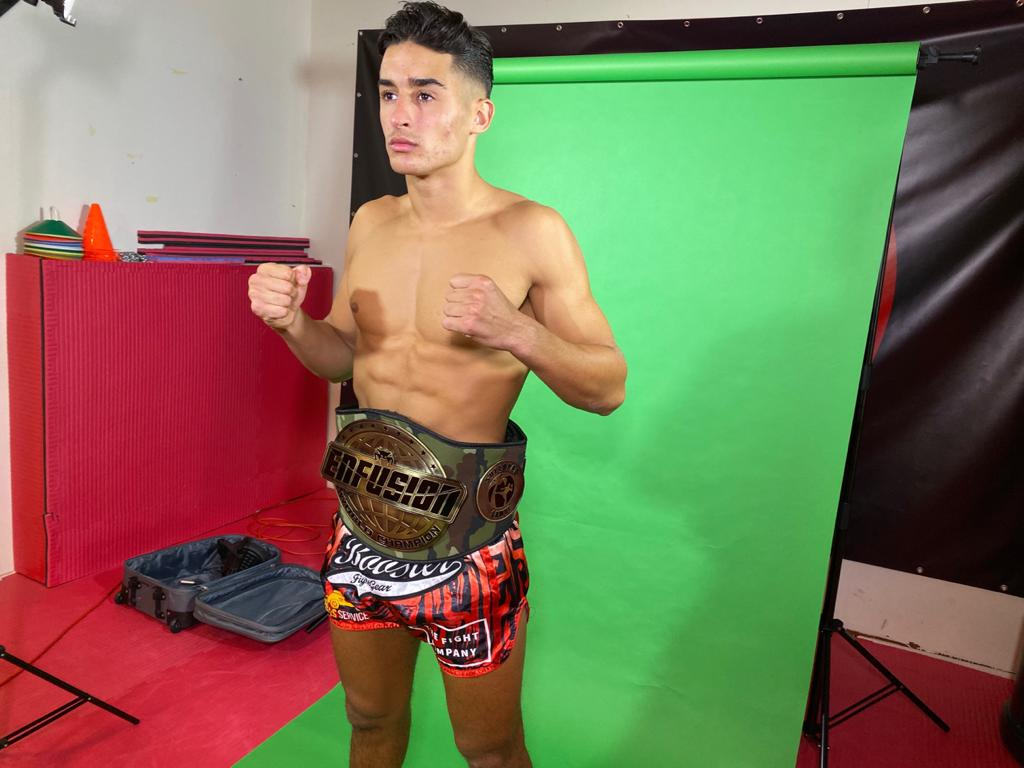
- Boutasaa in April 2020
- Born: August 4, 1999 (age 27); Amsterdam, Netherlands
- Other names: Too Sharp
- Nationality: Dutch; Moroccan
- Height: 183 cm (6 ft 0 in)
- Weight: 77.0 kg (169.8 lb; 12.13 st)
- Style: Kickboxing
- Stance: Southpaw
- Fighting out of: Amsterdam, Netherlands
- Team: Team Bennasser Southpaw Gym
- Trainer: Mohamed Bennasser
- Years active: 2017 - present

Kickboxing record
- Total: 25
- Wins: 22
- By knockout: 5
- Losses: 3

Mohammed Boutasaa, born 4 August 1999, is a Dutch-Moroccan kickboxer, currently competing in the welterweight division of Glory.

As of November 2026 he was the #9 ranked welterweight kickboxer in the world by Combat Press.

== Biography and career ==
Mohammed Boutasaa grew up in the city of Amsterdam, in the Transvaalbuurt district. He is from Nador. He was born into a Moroccan family from the Rif mountains, more specifically from the Amazigh tribe of Aït Saïd, established in the province of Driouch. At the age of ten, he began training under Mohamed Ben Nasser.

=== Enfusion ===
Boutasaa made his professional debut against Ahmad Chikh Mousa at Enfusion Talents 41 on November 11, 2017. He won the fight by unanimous decision. Boutasaa amassed a 9–0 record during the next two years, with two stoppage victories, before challenging for the Enfusion title.

Boutasaa faced Khalid Elmoukadam for the vacant Enfusion 67 kg World Championship at Enfusion #96 on February 29, 2020. He won the fight by unanimous decision.

After capturing the vacant title, Boutasaa was booked to face Angelo Volpe in a non-title bout at Enfusion #99 on October 17, 2020. He won the fight by a third-round knockout.

Boutasaa faced Youssef El Haji in a non-title bout at Enfusion #103 on October 23, 2021, following a year-long absence from the sport. He won the fight by unanimous decision.

Boutassa faced Patryk Radoń in another non-title bout at Enfusion #104 on November 12, 2021. He won the fight by a second-round stoppage, flooring Radoń with a left hook.

=== ONE Championship ===
On March 31, 2022, ONE Championship announced that they had signed Boutasaa. Boutasaa made his promotional debut against the former Glory Lightweight Champion and Kunlun Fight 70kg World Max Tournament Champion Davit Kiria at ONE 157 on May 20, 2022. He won the fight by unanimous decision.

Boutasaa is scheduled to face the former Glory and Kunlun Fight lightweight champion Sitthichai Sitsongpeenong at ONE on Prime Video 3 on October 21, 2022. He lost the fight by unanimous decision.

Boutassa faced Mohammad Siasarani at ONE Friday Fights 18 on May 26, 2023. He lost the fight by unanimous decision.

Boutassa faced Furkan Karabag at ONE Friday Fights 35 on September 29, 2023. He won the fight by unanimous decision.

On October 23, 2024, Boutassa announced he was leaving ONE Championship.

=== K-1 ===
Boutasaa made his K-1 debut against Riku at K-1 World MAX 2025 on February 9, 2025. He lost the bout via majority decision.

=== Glory ===
Boutasaa made his Glory debut against Cédric Do at Glory 107, on April 25, 2026. He won the bout via unanimous decision.

Boutasaa returned against Figuereido Landman at Glory 109, on September 5, 2026. He won the bout via unanimous decision.

== Personal life ==
Mohammed Boutasaa speaks Dutch language and the Rifians Tamazight language: Tarifit. He is fluent in English language.

== Titles and accomplishments ==
- Enfusion
  - 2020 Enfusion -67 kg World Championship
  - 2019 Knockout of the Year (vs. Ilias Zouggary)
- International Fight Promotion
  - 2026 IFP World Lightweight (-70 kg) Champion

== Fight record ==
Professional kickboxing record
22 wins (5 (T)KOs), 3 losses, 0 draw
Date	Result	Opponent	Event	Location	Method	Round	Time
2026-09-05	Win	(Netherlands) Figuereido Landman	Glory 109	Rotterdam, Netherlands	Decision (unanimous)	3	3:00
2026-05-23	Win	(China) Han Wenbao	IFP Fight Series #5	Essen, Germany	TKO (doctor stoppage)	4	
Wins the inaugural IFP Super Lightweight (-70kg) World title
2026-04-25	Win	(France) Cédric Do	Glory 107	Rotterdam, Netherlands	Decision (unanimous)	3	3:00
2025-12-14	Win	(Belgium) Nafi Bilalovski	IFP Cage Series	Genk, Belgium	Decision (unanimous)	3	3:00
2025-09-27	Win	(Netherlands) Mike Frenken	IFP Fight Series	Genk, Belgium	Decision (unanimous)	3	3:00
2025-02-09	Loss	(Japan) Riku	K-1 World MAX 2025	Tokyo, Japan	Decision (majority)	3	3:00
2024-11-23	Win	(France) James Condé	Fair FC 18	Bochum, Germany	Decision (unanimous)	3	3:00
2024-02-09	Win	(Russia) Dmitry Changelia	ONE Friday Fights 51, Lumpinee Stadium	Bangkok, Thailand	Decision (split)	3	3:00
2023-09-29	Win	(Turkey) Furkan Karabag	ONE Friday Fights 35, Lumpinee Stadium	Bangkok, Thailand	Decision (unanimous)	3	3:00
2023-05-26	Loss	(Iran) Mohammad Siasarani	ONE Friday Fights 18	Bangkok, Thailand	Decision (unanimous)	3	3:00
2022-10-22	Loss	(Thailand) Sitthichai Sitsongpeenong	ONE on Prime Video 3	Kuala Lumpur, Malaysia	Decision (unanimous)	3	3:00
2022-05-20	Win	(Georgia (country)) Davit Kiria	ONE 157	Kallang, Singapore	Decision (unanimous)	3	3:00
2021-11-12	Win	(Poland) Patryk Radoń	Enfusion #104	Abu Dhabi, United Arab Emirates	KO (left hook)	2	
2021-10-23	Win	(Morocco) Youssef El Haji	Enfusion #103	Wuppertal, Germany	Decision (unanimous)	3	3:00
2020-10-17	Win	(Italy) Angelo Volpe	Enfusion #99	Wuppertal, Germany	TKO (referee stoppage)	3	2:48
2020-02-29	Win	(Morocco) Khalid El Moukadam	Enfusion #96	Eindhoven, Netherlands	Decision (unanimous)	5	3:00
Wins the Enfusion 67 kg World Championship.
2019-11-02	Win	(Morocco) Ilias Zouggary	Enfusion #90	Antwerp, Belgium	KO (right high kick)	1	0:30
2019-06-30	Win	(Germany) Ahmad Chikh Mousa	Mano a Mano - Return Of The King	Amsterdam, Netherlands	Decision (unanimous)	3	3:00
2019-06-08	Win	(Germany) Kristian Malocaj	Enfusion #85	Groningen, Netherlands	Decision (unanimous)	3	3:00
2019-02-23	Win	(Netherlands) Bahez Khoshnaw	Enfusion #79	Eindhoven, Netherlands	Decision (unanimous)	3	3:00
2018-11-17	Win	(Belgium) Shamil Uvaysov	Enfusion #74	Groningen, Netherlands	TKO (low kick)	3	1:21
2018-05-12	Win	(Netherlands) Kevin Henneken	Enfusion #67	The Hague, Netherlands	Decision (unanimous)	3	3:00
2018-04-14	Win	(Morocco) Faouzi el Kandousi	Bari Gym	Noordwijkerhout, Netherlands	Decision (unanimous)	3	3:00
2018-03-09	Win	(France) Islem Hamech	Enfusion Talents 47	Abu Dhabi, United Arab Emirates	Decision (unanimous)	3	3:00
2017-11-11	Win	(Germany) Ahmad Chikh Mousa	Enfusion Talents 41	Amsterdam, Netherlands	Decision (unanimous)	3	3:00
Legend: Win Loss Draw/no contest Notes

Amateur kickboxing record
Date	Result	Opponent	Event	Location	Method	Round	Time
2016-04-09	Win	Hafiz Ashikali	Bari Gym Kickboks Event 13	Noordwijkerhout, Netherlands	Decision	3	2:00
2016-02-07	Win	Hamza Hazzar	Buurthuis Transvaal	Amsterdam, Netherlands	Decision	3	2:00
Legend: Win Loss Draw/no contest Notes

== See also ==
- List of male kickboxers
