= Pierre Andurand =

French businessman

- Born: February 1977 (age 49); Aix-en-Provence, France
- Occupations: Businessman and hedge fund manager
- Spouses: Evgenia Slusarenko (m. 2011; div. 2016) Elena Sereda (m. 2019)

Pierre Andurand (born February 1977) is a French businessman and hedge fund manager. His funds have approximately $2bn in assets under management. He is also the majority shareholder of the international kickboxing league Glory.

== Early life ==
Andurand was born in Aix-en-Provence, France. At eight years old, he moved with his family to the French island of Réunion, off the African coast. He spent six years there before returning to Aix en Provence. At the age of seventeen he moved to the city of Toulouse to attend the Institut National des Sciences Appliquées (National Institute of Applied Sciences) where he got his Msc. in Applied Mathematics before moving to École des Hautes Études Commerciales de Paris (HEC School of Management in Paris), where he achieved an MSc. in International Finance.

He also holds a MSc in Computer Science from Columbia University, and a MSc in Mathematical and Theoretical Physics from the University of Oxford, and an MSc in Astrophysics from Queen Mary University of London.

A keen swimmer in his youth, Andurand was a member of the French National Junior Swimming Team in 1993 and 1994.

== Career ==
After graduation Andurand was recruited by Goldman Sachs to work as an oil trader for its commodities trading unit in Singapore. After Goldman Sachs he joined Bank of America Singapore as a Principal in oil trading. He then joined Vitol in Singapore as a trading manager. Andurand then moved to London in 2004 and was made a partner. He was rumoured to be one of the most successful traders in the company, earning him a bonus payment of $20 million at the end of one particularly successful year's trading.

=== Bluegold Capital ===
In October 2007, Andurand co-founded the hedge-fund investment group BlueGold. He was the majority shareholder and Chief Investment Officer at BlueGold. The BlueGold Global Fund was then launched in February 2008 with $300 million assets under management. In June of that year, its returns were described by the New York Post as being of "eye-popping" and "monstrous" proportions. Its peak in assets under management reached $2.4 billion. Performance was 210% in 2008, 55% in 2009, 13% in 2010, and -34% in 2011. BlueGold was closed in April 2012, returning close to 99% of its assets under management within a month, after the founders decided to go their separate ways.

=== Andurand Capital ===
In February 2013, Pierre Andurand launched a new hedge fund: Andurand Capital, which set out to invest mostly in energy and commodities including oil and metals.

In 2013, the Andurand Commodities Fund finished the year as one of the best performing commodities hedge funds with a 25% return. In 2014, the fund generated a 38% return net of all fees by forecasting a sharp decline in crude oil prices.

By 2016 Andurand had turned bullish on oil, amid a bear market that saw oil at a 12-year low of $30 a barrel. He returned 22% that year.

The firm has $2 billion in assets under management as of June 2022, across a number of separate funds. The biggest fund, the Andurand Commodities Discretionary Enhanced Fund, returned 162% to June 2022, having returned 87% in 2021; the $750m Andurand Commodities Fund was up 41% in the same period.

=== 2020 Covid-19 pandemic and world oil price slump ===
In an interview with the Financial Times, Andurand said the COVID-19 had become his singular area of focus since early 2020, when he spent two weeks studying the early spread of the disease. Andurand claimed it was clear to him from February that the virus was going to spread to the rest of the world, that it was contagious, and that the potential death toll made lockdowns inevitable. He positioned his funds to bet against the oil price, in the belief that energy would be one of the hardest-hit sectors. In mid-2021 Andurand again turned bullish on oil amid a recovery in demand and a tail-off in supply growth. His Andurand Commodities Discretionary Enhanced Fund ended with annual gains of 87% in 2021, following gains of 154% in 2020. The same fund was up 112% for the year to date through April 2022. His older Andurand Commodities Fund closed 2021 up 36%.

=== Andurand Climate and Energy Fund ===
In July 2021, Andurand launched an environmental fund, further to the firm's focus on green energy transition. The Andurand Climate and Energy Transition Fund had returned 28% by January 2022.

=== Glory Kickboxing ===
A martial arts fan, Andurand turned to kickboxing as a means to keep fit while working as an oil trader. He formed Glory World Series after rival series K-1 ran into financial difficulties and refused Andurand's offer of a buy-out.

In September 2016, Glory Sports International announced a Series B financing round with Yao Capital, the investment firm founded by Chinese basketball star Yao Ming, acquiring a significant strategic stake in the company; Liberty Global also participated in the syndicate. Existing Glory shareholders, including TwinFocus Capital Partners of Boston, also participated in the financing round.

== Personal life ==
In August 2011, Andurand married Evgenia Slusarenko, before they agreed to a divorce in 2016. In July 2019, he married Elena Sereda.
