= Fabian Lorito =

Swiss-Italian kickboxer

- Born: Fabian Lorito; May 6, 2000 (age 26); Möriken-Wildegg, Switzerland
- Other names: Fabian Sinbimuaythai
- Nickname: Iron Fist
- Height: 1.85 m (6 ft 1 in)
- Weight: 85 kg (187 lb; 13.4 st)
- Division: Middleweight
- Style: Kickboxing
- Stance: Orthodox
- Fighting out of: Zurich, Switzerland
- Team: Team Stefanovski; David Gym Zurich

Kickboxing record
- Total: 35
- Wins: 27
- By knockout: 8
- Losses: 8
- By knockout: 3
- Draws: 0

Fabian Lorito (born May 6, 2000) is a Swiss-Italian kickboxer. He is a former WAKO-Pro Low Kick world light cruiserweight champion, and was runner-up in the 2026 SENSHI Middleweight Grand Prix.

As of October 2026, he is ranked as the 7th best middleweight in the world by Beyond Kickboxing.

== Career ==
On December 28, 2024, Lorito faced Nikola Stošić at the Smederevo Combat Night event in Serbia with the WAKO-Pro Low Kick World Light Cruiserweight title at stake. Lorito won the fight by first-round knockout with a left hook.

Lorito faced Ramy Deghir on February 8, 2025, at the Villejuif Boxing Show 7 event with the vacant WAKO-Pro K-1 European Light Cruiserweight title at stake. Lorito won the fight by split decision.

On July 12, 2025, Lorito faced Ulric Bokeme at Senshi 27. He lost the fight by unanimous decision.

On December 6, 2025, Lorito faced Alexandru Velenciuc at Senshi 29. He won the fight by a third-round knockout.

Lorito faced the 2026 K-1 World GP -90kg World Championship Tournament winner Lukas Achterberg at K-1 Genki 2026 on April 11, 2026. He lost the fight by a first-round knockout.

Lorito was scheduled to take part in an eight-man one-night Grand Prix at SENSHI 32 on July 11, 2026, in Varna, Bulgaria. In the quarterfinals he defeated David Szabo-Toth by majority decision. In the semifinals he defeated Olivier Langlois-Ross by majority decision before being knocked out in the final by Joshua Akingbade with a second-round body kick.

== Championships and accomplishments ==
=== Kickboxing ===
- International Sport Kickboxing Association
  - 2022 ISKA K-1 Switzerland Light Cruiserweight (-85 kg) Champion
- Boss-Art Championship
  - 2024 Boss-Art Championship K-1 83 kg Champion
- World Association of Kickboxing Organizations
  - 2024 WAKO-Pro Low Kick World Light Cruiserweight (-85 kg) Champion
  - 2025 WAKO-Pro K-1 European Light Cruiserweight (-85 kg) Champion
- SENSHI
  - 2026 SENSHI Middleweight (-85 kg) Grand Prix Runner-up

=== Muay Thai ===
- World Kickboxing and Karate Union
  - 2024 WKU Muay Thai European 83 kg Champion
- Sinbi Stadium
  - 2023 Sinbi Stadium Champion

== Fight record ==
Professional Kickboxing and Muay Thai record
27 Wins (8 (T)KO's), 7 Losses, 0 Draws, 0 No Contests
Date	Result	Opponent	Event	Location	Method	Round	Time
2027-02-27		TBA	Gladiators Night 15	Dietikon, Switzerland			
2026-10-24	Loss	(Romania) Marius Rotaru	Nellenburg Fightnight 46	Stockach, Germany	TKO (low kick)	3	1:39
For the A.F.S.O. Middleweight (-85 kg) World Championship.
2026-09-19	Win	(Spain) Florin Mihai	Gladiators Night 14	Dietikon, Switzerland	TKO (referee stoppage)	1	2:43
2026-07-11	Loss	(Republic of Ireland) Joshua Akingbade	SENSHI 32 - Middleweight Grand Prix, Final	Varna, Bulgaria	KO (body kick)	2	2:13
For the 2026 SENSHI Middleweight (-85 kg) Grand Prix.
2026-07-11	Win	(Canada) Olivier Langlois-Ross	SENSHI 32 - Middleweight Grand Prix, Semifinals	Varna, Bulgaria	Decision (majority)	3	3:00
2026-07-11	Win	(Hungary) David Szabo-Toth	SENSHI 32 - Middleweight Grand Prix, Quarterfinals	Varna, Bulgaria	Decision (majority)	3	3:00
2026-06-13	Win	(Portugal) Romão Paz	Gladiators Night 13	Dietikon, Switzerland	Decision (unanimous)	3	3:00
2026-04-11	Loss	(Germany) Lukas Achterberg	K-1 Genki 2026	Tokyo, Japan	KO (left hook)	1	2:01
2026-02-07	Win	(Spain) Mohamed Asbared	Gladiators Night 12	Dietikon, Switzerland	Decision (unanimous)	3	3:00
2025-12-06	Win	(Moldova) Alexandru Velenciuc	SENSHI 29	Varna, Bulgaria	KO (jumping front kick)	3	2:47
2025-09-27	Win	(Poland) Szymon Sołtys	Gladiators Night 11	Dietikon, Switzerland	KO (left straight)	2	0:56
2025-07-12	Loss	(Democratic Republic of the Congo) Ulric Bokeme	SENSHI 27	Varna, Bulgaria	Decision (unanimous)	3	3:00
2025-06-14	Win	(Italy) Renato Prenga	Gladiators Night 10	Dietikon, Switzerland	Decision	3	3:00
2025-05-08	Win	(Romania) Vasile Amariței	FCE 4	Lisbon, Portugal	Decision (unanimous)	3	3:00
2025-02-08	Win	(France) Ramy Deghir	Villejuif Boxing Show 7	Villejuif, France	Decision (split)	5	3:00
Wins the vacant WAKO-Pro K-1 European Light Cruiserweight (-85 kg) title.
2024-12-28	Win	(Serbia) Nikola Stošić	Smederevo Combat Night	Smederevo, Serbia	KO (left hook)	1	
Wins the WAKO-Pro Low Kick World Light Cruiserweight (-85 kg) title.
2024-11-09	Loss	(Switzerland) Adam Mohamed	Boss-Art Championship 11	Baar, Switzerland	Decision	3	3:00
2024-09-28	Win	(Romania) Alexandru Andreescu	Gladiators Night 8	Dietikon, Switzerland	Decision (unanimous)	3	3:00
2024-07-27	Loss	(China) Zhang Chengcheng	WLM Wulin League	Hangzhou, China	Decision (unanimous)	3	3:00
2024-06-15	Win	(Brazil) Rodrigo Mineiro	Gladiators Night 7	Dietikon, Switzerland	TKO (retirement/injury)	4	1:15
Wins the vacant WKU Muay Thai European -83 kg title.
2024-04-27	Win	(Switzerland) Carlo Meichtry	Boss-Art Championship 10	Baar, Switzerland	KO (left hook)	2	2:07
Wins the Boss-Art Championship K-1 -83 kg title.
2024-02-17	Win	(Germany) Emil Kozovic	Gladiators Night 6	Dietikon, Switzerland	Decision (unanimous)	3	3:00
2023-11-04	Win	(Czech Republic) Pavel Šach	Boss-Art Championship 9	Baar, Switzerland	Decision (unanimous)	3	3:00
2023-09-30	Win	(Greece) Stefanos Konstantelopoulos	Argovia Fight Night 5	Baden, Switzerland	Decision	3	3:00
2023-07-29	Win	(Iran) Rama Tigermuaythai	Sinbi Boxing Stadium Fights	Phuket, Thailand	Decision	3	3:00
2023-07-15	Win	(Morocco) Mat RevolutionPhuket	Sinbi Boxing Stadium Fights	Phuket, Thailand	TKO (doctor stoppage)	3	
Wins the Sinbi Stadium title.
2023-06-17	Loss	(Switzerland) Bledar Dakaj	Gladiators Night 5	Dietikon, Switzerland	Decision	3	3:00
2023-04-15	Win	(Romania) Mădălin Mogoş	Boss-Art Championship	Baar, Switzerland	KO		
2022-11-05	Win	(Italy) Emanuele Parisi	Boss-Art Championship	Baar, Switzerland	Decision (unanimous)	3	3:00
2022-07-02	Win	(Switzerland) Luk Messerli	DEDZO'S Fight Night	Rafz, Switzerland	Decision (unanimous)	3	3:00
Wins the ISKA K-1 Switzerland -85 kg title.
2020-02-01	Win	(Switzerland) Yoann Stoller	GVA Fight Night 2	Geneva, Switzerland	Decision (unanimous)	3	3:00
2019-12-07	Win	(Switzerland) Mike Akwasi	Swiss Las Vegas	Basel, Switzerland	Decision (unanimous)	3	3:00
2019-09-28	Win	(Switzerland) Farnel Tchamaleu	Swiss Las Vegas	Basel, Switzerland	Decision (unanimous)	3	3:00
Legend: Win Loss Draw/No contest Notes

== See also ==
- List of male kickboxers
