= Ahmad Chikh Mousa =

German kickboxer (born 2000)

- Born: Ahmad Chikh Mousa; March 20, 2000 (age 26); Amuda, Syria
- Other names: Golden Boy; Ahmed Yusef
- Nationality: German
- Height: 177 cm (5 ft 9 1/2 in)
- Weight: 65 kg (143 lb; 10 st)
- Division: Featherweight
- Style: Kick Boxing
- Fighting out of: Düsseldorf, Germany
- Team: Amrani Palace/Hemmers Gym; Contact Sports Bochum (former)
- Trainer: Kamal El Amrani/Nick Hemmers

Kickboxing record
- Total: 34
- Wins: 26
- By knockout: 9
- Losses: 7
- By knockout: 1
- Draws: 1

Mixed martial arts record
- Total: 1
- Wins: 1
- By knockout: 1
- Losses: 0

Other information
- Boxing record from BoxRec

Ahmad Chikh Mousa (born March 20, 2000) is a German kickboxer. He currently competes in the featherweight division of Glory.

As of July 2023 Chikh Mousa was the #10 ranked -67.5 kg kickboxer in the world by Beyond Kickboxing.

== Career ==
=== Early career ===
On November 11, 2017, Mousa faced Mohammed Boutasaa at Enfusion Talents 41 in Amsterdam. He lost the fight by unanimous decision. Chikh Mousa was scheduled to face Rosario Falsone at Fair FC 8. He won by knockout with punches in the second round. On March 17, 2018, Chikh Mousa defeated Johannes Peterson by technical knockout in the fourth round to capture the vacant AFSO ProAm European title.

Chikh Mousa was scheduled to face Jeton Bajra at Enfusion Talents 69 on May 4, 2019. He won by technical knockout in the first round. Chikh Mousa was scheduled to face Ilias Darrazi at Big Game 3 on March 23, 2019. He won the fight by unanimous decision. Chikh Mousa was scheduled to face Khalid El Moukadam at Enfusion 91 on November 11, 2019. He lost the fight by decision.

Chikh Mousa was scheduled to face Awos Mansor at Enfusion Xtreme Stand Up 8 on June 5, 2022. He won the fight by unanimous decision. Chikh Mousa faced Artur Scherer at Enfusion Xtreme Stand Up 6 in Wuppertal, Germany. He won by knockout in the first round with punches.

=== Glory ===
Chikh Mousa made his debut for the Glory Kickboxing promotion at Glory 81 in Düsseldorf, Germany against Rafik Habiat. He won the fight by knockout at the end of the first round with a left hook. For his second Glory appearance Chikh Mousa faced Mohamed El Hammouti at Glory 82 in Bron, Germany, on November 19, 2022. He won the fight by unanimous decision. Chikh Mousa was scheduled to face reigning WKN K-1 world 65 kg champion Berjan Peposhi at Glory 83 on February 11, 2023. Peposhi was riding a 13-fight winning streak prior to the fight. Chikh Mousa won the bout by unanimous decision after scoring a knockdown in the third round.

Chikh Mousa challenged Petpanomrung Kiatmuu9 for his Glory lightweight title at Glory 86 on May 27, 2023. He lost the fight by unanimous decision after he was knocked down in the third round. Chikh Mousa faced Abraham Vidales at Glory: Collision 6 on November 4, 2023. He lost the fight by a first-round technical knockout.

== Titles and accomplishments ==
- Glory
  - 2023 Glory Fight of the Year (vs. Berjan Peposhi)
- World Fighting League
  - 2026 interim WFL Lightweight Champion

== Mixed martial arts record ==
Professional record breakdown
1 match	1 win	0 losses
By knockout	1	0

Res.	Record	Opponent	Method	Event	Date	Round	Time	Location	Notes
		Zinedine El Mahdi		Oktagon 99: Aras vs. Flores	December 5, 2026			Dortmund, Germany	68.5 kg catchweight.
Win	1-0	Diego Santos	KO (punch)	USC 4	May 5, 2025	1	2:11	Aachen, Germany	72 kg catchweight.

== Kickboxing record ==
Professional Kickboxing Record
26 Wins (9 (T)KO's), 7 Losses, 0 Draw
Date	Result	Opponent	Event	Location	Method	Round	Time
2026-06-27	Win	(Turkey) Semih Keskin	World Fighting League	Utrecht, Netherlands	Decision (Unanimous)	3	3:00
Wins the interim World Fighting League Lightweight (-70kg) title
2026-05-23	Win	(Greece) Achilleas Karapiperis	IFP Fight Series #5	Essen, Germany	Decision (Unanimous)	3	3:00
2024-12-14	Win	(Spain) Antonio Campoy	UAM Fight Night K1 Pro	Abu Dhabi, UAE	Decision (Split)	3	3:00
2024-11-23	Win	(Portugal) Leandro Almeida	Fair FC 18	Bochum, Germany	TKO (Low kicks)	3	
2024-05-18	Loss	(Albania) Berjan Peposhi	Glory 92	Rotterdam, Netherlands	Decision (Unanimous)	3	3:00
2024-02-16	Win	(New Zealand) Kayne Conlan	AFS: Australia vs The World	Dubai, UAE	Decision (Unanimous)	3	3:00
2023-11-04	Loss	(Mexico) Abraham Vidales	Glory: Collision 6	Arnhem, Netherlands	TKO (Punches)	1	1:13
2023-05-27	Loss	(Thailand) Petpanomrung Kiatmuu9	Glory 86	Essen, Germany	Decision (Unanimous)	5	3:00
For the Glory Featherweight Championship.
2023-02-11	Win	(Albania) Berjan Peposhi	Glory 83	Essen, Germany	Decision (Unanimous)	3	3:00
2022-11-19	Win	(Morocco) Mohamed El Hammouti	Glory 82	Bonn, Germany	Decision (Unanimous)	3	3:00
2022-08-20	Win	(Morocco) Rafik Habiat	Glory 81	Düsseldorf, Germany	KO (Left hook)	1	3:00
2022-06-05	Win	(France) Awos Mansor	Enfusion Xtreme Stand Up 8	Darmstadt, Germany	Decision (Unanimous)	3	3:00
2022-03-27	Win	(Georgia (country)) Tsotne Sultanishvili	Big Game 4	Bochum, Germany	Decision (Unanimous)	3	3:00
2021-10-24	Win	(Germany) Artur Scherer	Enfusion Xtreme Stand Up 6	Wuppertal, Germany	KO (Punches)	1	
2020-10-04	Win	(Germany) Ali Rezaie	FAIR FC 10 STRIKING EDITION	Bochum, Germany	Decision (Unanimous)	3	3:00
2019-12-06	Win	(Afghanistan) Qaisar Amerchel	Cologne Beatdown	Cologne, Germany	TKO	2	
2019-11-16	Loss	(Morocco) Khalid El Moukadam	Enfusion 91	Groningen, Netherlands	Decision	3	3:00
2019-10-26	Win	(Greece) Kostas Papadopoulos	Enfusion Talents 75	Wuppertal, Germany	Decision (Unanimous)	3	3:00
2019-06-30	Loss	(Morocco) Mohammed Boutasaa	Mano a Mano - Return Of The King	Amsterdam, Netherlands	Decision (Unanimous)	3	3:00
2019-05-04	Win	(Germany) Jeton Bajra	Enfusion Talents 69	Darmstadt, Germany	TKO	1	
2019-03-23	Win	(Morocco) Ilias Darrazi	Big Game 3	Darmstadt, Germany	Decision (Unanimous)	3	3:00
2018-12-16	Win	(Morocco) Nabil Cherti	Heroic Battle 24	Herne, Germany	Decision (Unanimous)	3	3:00
2018-10-27	Loss	(Morocco) Nabil Haryouli	Enfusion Talents 61	Oberhausen, Germany	Decision	3	3:00
2018-10-06	Win	(Italy) Rosario Falsone	Fair FC 8	Bochum, Germany	KO (Punches)	2	
2018-08-25	Win	(Germany) Safiullah Habibi	Heroic Battle 23	Herne, Germany	Decision (Unanimous)	3	3:00
2018-06-30	Win	(Denmark) Johannes Bakke Peterson	A.F.S.O Workers Hall Open Air Gala	Dorsten, Germany	TKO	4	
Wins the vacant AFSO ProAm European title.
2018-05-12	Win	(Morocco) Younes Sultani	Heroic Battle 21	Herne, Germany	Decision	3	3:00
2018-04-07	Win	(Turkey) Bedirhan Kabak	Heroic Battle 20	Herne, Germany	Decision (Unanimous)	3	3:00
2018-03-10	Win	(Germany) Junus Desdanovik	Big Game 2	Bochum, Germany	KO (Left hook to the body)	2	1:43
2018-02-17	Win	(Germany)	Workers Hall	Dorsten, Germany	KO (Left hook to the body)	2	
2018-01-20	Win	(Germany) Fahrid Kohdamani	Heroic Battle 19	Herne, Germany	KO (Low kicks)	2	
2017-11-25	Win	(Germany) Melik Avcu	KingZ Fight Night IV	Lüdenscheid, Germany	Decision (Unanimous)	3	3:00
2017-11-11	Loss	(Morocco) Mohammed Boutasaa	Enfusion Talents 41	Amsterdam, Netherlands	Decision (Unanimous)	3	3:00
Legend: Win Loss Draw/No contest Notes

== See also ==
- List of male kickboxers
