= Deniz Demirkapu =

Belgian-Turkish kickboxer

- Born: June 23, 2000 (age 26); Brussels, Belgium
- Other names: Bad Boy
- Nationality: Belgian; Turkish; Moroccan
- Height: 176 cm (5 ft 9 1/2 in)
- Weight: 65 kg (143 lb; 10 st)
- Style: Kickboxing
- Fighting out of: Brussels, Belgium
- Team: Elite Training Center; Queensburry
- Trainer: Kamal Chabrani

Kickboxing record
- Total: 32
- Wins: 24
- By knockout: 16
- Losses: 8
- By knockout: 4
- Draws: 0

Other information
- Notable relatives: Yilmaz Demirkapu (father)

Deniz Demirkapu is a Belgian-Turkish kickboxer, currently competing in the featherweight division of Glory. He is a former Enfusion World Featherweight Champion and Glory Featherweight world title challenger.

== Career ==
=== Early career ===
On April 22, 2017, Demirkapu faced Laurent Marie Françoise at King of the Ring 6. He won the fight by first-round knockout with a jumping knee.

On May 13, 2017, Demirkapu faced Ahmed Ferradji at La Nuit Des Titans 4. He won the bout by first-round technical knockout after three knockdowns.

Demirkapu faced Kenta Hayashi at K-1 World GP 2019: Japan vs World & Special Superfight in Osaka on August 24, 2019. Hayashi suffered a knockdown in the first round, but managed to rally back in the second round, winning the fight by a second-round technical knockout.

On June 25, 2021, Demirkpau faced Craig coakley at Muaythai Night 6. He lost the fight by split decision.

On November 5, 2022, Demirkapu faced Matěj Trčka at Glory Rivals 3. He won the fight by first-round knockout.

=== ONE Championship ===
Demirkapu made his debut for the ONE Championship organization at ONE Friday Fights 53 on February 23, 2024, against Buakhiao Por.Paoin. He won the fight by first-round knockout with a body kick.

On April 26, 2024, Demirkapu faced Suakim Sor.Jor.Tongprajin at ONE Friday Fights 60. He lost the fight by second-round knockout.

On September 20, 2024, Demirkapu faced Kongklai Sor.Sommai at ONE Friday Fights 80. He lost the fight by first-round knockout.

=== Glory ===
Demirkapu faced Berjan Peposhi at Glory 100. He lost the bout via unanimous decision after both fighters received knockdowns..

On February 7, 2026, Demirkapu faced Andre Santos at Glory 105. He won the bout via unanimous decision.

On April 25, 2026, Demirkapu faced Mohamed Hamami at Glory 107. He won the fight by second-round knockout.

Demirkapu rematched Berjan Peposhi on June 13, 2026, at Glory Collision 9. He won the fight by unanimous decision.

Demirkapu was scheduled to face Miguel Trindade for the vacant Glory Featherweight Championship.on October 17, 2026, at Glory 110. He lost the fight by technical knockout in the third round after suffering three knockdowns, all from low kicks.

== Titles and accomplishments ==
- Enfusion
  - 2024 Enfusion World Featherweight (-65kg) Champion

== Fight record ==
Professional Kickboxing and Muay Thai Record
24 Wins (16 (T)KO's), 8 Losses, 0 Draw
Date	Result	Opponent	Event	Location	Method	Round	Time
2027-02-06		(Albania) Berjan Peposhi	Glory 111	Rotterdam, Netherlands			
2026-10-17	Loss	(Portugal) Miguel Trindade	Glory 110	Antwerp, Belgium	TKO (3 knockdowns)	3	1:33
For the vacant Glory Featherweight Championship.
2026-06-13	Win	(Albania) Berjan Peposhi	Glory Collision 9	Rotterdam, Netherlands	Decision (unanimous)	3	3:00
2026-04-25	Win	(Morocco) Mohamed Hamami	Glory 107	Rotterdam, Netherlands	KO (knee to the body)	2	1:45
2026-02-07	Win	(Portugal) Andre Santos	Glory 105	Arnhem, Netherlands	Decision (unanimous)	3	3:00
2025-12-21	Win	(Cape Verde) Jeremi Monteiro	Real Fighters – A Night 2 Remember	Hilversum, Netherlands	Decision	3	3:00
2025-06-14	Loss	(Albania) Berjan Peposhi	Glory 100	Rotterdam, Netherlands	Decision (unanimous)	3	3:00
2025-05-03	Win	(Romania) Andrei Sirghi	Rising Stars 3	Brussels, Belgium	TKO (middle kicks)	1	
2024-09-20	Loss	(Thailand) Kongklai Sor.Sommai	ONE Friday Fights 80, Lumpinee Stadium	Bangkok, Thailand	KO (left cross)	1	1:45
2024-04-26	Loss	(Thailand) Suakim Sor.Jor.Tongprajin	ONE Friday Fights 60, Lumpinee Stadium	Bangkok, Thailand	KO (Left hook)	2	1:22
2024-02-23	Win	(Thailand) Buakhiao Por.Paoin	ONE Friday Fights 53, Lumpinee Stadium	Bangkok, Thailand	KO (front kick to the body)	1	0:59
2023-10-24	Win	(Netherlands) Rhydel Vogelenzang	Enfusion 126	Eindhoven, Netherlands	Decision (unanimous)	5	3:00
Defended the Enfusion World Featherweight title.
2022-11-05	Win	(Czech Republic) Matěj Trčka	Glory Rivals 3	Amsterdam, Netherlands	TKO (low kicks)	1	1:50
2022-09-24	Win	(Morocco) Hamza Essalih	Enfusion 112	Eindhoven, Netherlands	KO (punches)	1	
Won the vacant Enfusion World Featherweight title.
2022-05-28	Win	(Luxembourg) Prince Junior	EMP Fight Night 2	Brussels, Belgium	Decision	3	3:00
2021-11-07	Win	(Spain) Carlos Araya	A Night 2 Remember	Hilversum, Netherlands	Decision	3	3:00
2021-08-27	Win	(France) Juliano Anago	PSM Fight Night	Schaerbeek, Belgium	TKO (doctor stoppage)	1	
2021-06-25	Loss	(Republic of Ireland) Craig Coakley	Muaythai Night 6	Abu Dhabi, UAE	Decision (split)	3	3:00
2019-08-24	Loss	(Japan) Kenta Hayashi	K-1 World GP 2019: Japan vs World & Special Superfight in Osaka	Osaka, Japan	TKO (punches)	2	3:00
2019-07-06	Win	(Spain) Sedrick Da Silva	Real Fighters	Melilla, Spain	KO	1	
2019-03-31	Win	(Netherlands) Faouzi el Kanddousi	Real Fighters	Hilversum, Netherlands	TKO	1	
2017-11-11	Win	(Morocco) Tarik Lyachat	Enfusion 55	Amsterdam, Netherlands	Decision	3	3:00
2017-07-12	Win	(France) Mathis Djanoyan	The Faboulous Fight	Gréasque, France	TKO (referee stoppage)	1	
2017-07-01	Win	(Spain) Alfonso Perea	Champions Night 2	Istanbul, Turkey	TKO (doctor stoppage)	3	
2017-05-13	Win	(France) Ahmed Feraddji	La Nuit Des Titans 4	Montereau-Fault-Yonne, France	TKO (3 knockdowns)	1	2:15
2017-04-22	Win	(France) Laurent Marie Françoise	King Of The Ring 6	Longeville-les-Metz, France	KO (jumping knee)	1	2:36
2017-03-04	Loss	(France) Jérémy Legrand	Partouche Kickboxing Tour 3	Saint-Amand-les-Eaux, France	Ext.R Decision (majority)	4	3:00
2016-12-17	Loss	(France) Djany Fiorenti	The Warriors II	Prunelli-di-Fiumorbo, France	Decision	3	3:00
2016-11-05	Win	(Germany) Omer Cankardesler	A1WCC - Fair FC	Wuppertal, Germany	KO (spinning backfist)	1	
2016-09-25	Win	(Azerbaijan)	Fight Vision	Baku, Azerbaijan	KO (knee to the body)	1	
2016-05-28	Win	(Belgium) Ayoub Bouzambou	A1WCC	Eindhoven, Netherlands	Decision	3	3:00
2016-05-08	Win	(Russia) Nariman Saidbekov	Red Panthers	Wuppertal, Germany	TKO	2	
2016-04-23	Win	(Turkey) Mehmet Zeki Kaya	Champions Night	Istanbul, Turkey	KO (knee to the head)	1	
Legend: Win Loss Draw/No contest Notes

== See also ==
- List of male kickboxers
