= Marshall Zelaznik =

American sports industry executive

- Occupation: Sports executive
- Known for: UFC executive roles

Marshall Zelaznik is an American sports industry executive and the current CEO of GLORY kickboxing promotion.

Having started his career as a lawyer, Zelaznik eventually went in-house with pay-per-view television provider iN DEMAND as their vice president of programming before later accepting an offer of an executive role with the Ultimate Fighting Championship (UFC).

== Biography ==
In his ten years as executive vice president and chief content officer for the UFC, Zelaznik oversaw the organization's pay-per-view and digital business and was also tasked with growing the organization's presence in markets outside of the United States. During his tenure the UFC opened up markets in the UK, Brazil, Ireland, Germany, Sweden, Mexico, UAE, Japan, Korea, the Philippines, and Mexico.

Zelaznik created the UFC's own in-house digital streaming platform Fight Pass, which Inc. credits with "helping build UFC's content business into one of the most widely-available sports properties in the world". The UFC subsequently achieved a $4.025bn valuation - the largest-ever sports-industry acquisition, according to the New York Times - when it was sold by Zuffa LLC to Endeavor.

In the wake of the buyout of Zuffa LLC, Zelaznik was released by the new owners and replaced by their own personnel.

Zelaznik subsequently accepted a role as chief executive officer of the GLORY kickboxing organization. On March 14, 2020, internal Glory e-mails announced Zelaznik had resigned from Glory.

In June 2020 Zelaznik joined Vindex, LLC as Esports Engine's CEO.

Zelaznik re-joined GLORY as the CEO March 18, 2024.
