= Miguel Trindade =

Portuguese Muay Thai kickboxer

- Born: Miguel Angelo Trindade Temporário; January 5, 2001 (age 25); Lisbon, Portugal
- Other names: El Unico
- Height: 179 cm (5 ft 10 in)
- Weight: 65 kg (143 lb; 10.2 st)
- Division: Super Lightweight; Welterweight
- Style: Muay Thai, Kickboxing
- Stance: Orthodox
- Fighting out of: Ponferrada, Spain
- Team: Mamba Fight Club (2021–present)
- Trainer: Diego Vázquez

Kickboxing record
- Total: 27
- Wins: 22
- By knockout: 14
- Losses: 5

Miguel Trindade is a Portuguese kickboxer and Muay Thai fighter.

As of April 2024 he was the No. 3 ranked −67.5 kg kickboxer in the world by Beyond Kickboxing.

== Biography and career ==
=== Early career ===
Trindade started training at the age of 12. In the youth categories he amassed over eight medals in European and world amateur championships both in muay thai and kickboxing rules. He moved permanently from Lisbon, Portugal to Ponferrada, Spain in 2021 to train at the Mamba Fight Club and live off his fighting career.

=== ISKA and WAKO Pro European champion ===
On December 18, 2021, Trindade faced Victor Bordage at MFC 016 for the vacant ISKA European Muay Thai 63.5 kg championship. He won the fight by doctor stoppage in the second round.

Trindade injured his knee on February 18, 2022, during his participation in the 2022 IFMA European championships and was taken out of competition for a year as a consequence.

Trindade made his return to professional fighting following knee surgery on February 11, 2023, at UAM Fight Night K1 Pro against Kebrom Neguse. He won the fight by unanimous decision.

On April 22, 2023, Trindade broke the 25 win streaks of Por Tor Thor Petchrungruang at Thai Fight Rome when he knocked him out with a left hook just 37 seconds into the fight.

On May 27, 2023, Trindade faced Deividas Danyla at Blade Fights in Lithuania. He won the fight by unanimous decision.

Trindade faced Valentin Irace on July 8, 2023, at Brothers League XIV in Lisbon, Portugal for the vacant WAKO Pro K-1 European 64.5 kg title. He won the fight by unanimous decision.

Trindade travelled to Bangkok, Thailand on September 22, 2023, to face former Rajadamnern stadium champion Sibmuen Sitchefboontham at ONE Friday Fights 34. He won the fight by first-round knockout with a left hook to the body.

=== GLORY ===
In October 2023, Trindade announced that he signed a contract with the Glory organization.

He made his Glory debut at Glory 90 on December 23, 2023, against Berjan Peposhi. Trindade lost by split decision in a fight where fighters exchanged knockdowns. Their bout was in the shortlist for the 2023 Glory Fight of the Year award.

Trindade was scheduled to challenge reigning the RISE Super Lightweight (−65 kg) World Champion Chadd Collins in a non-title bout as part of an ongoing collaboration between the Glory and RISE organizations. Collins was at the time was undefeated under kickboxing rules. They faced each other at RISE ELDORADO 2024 on March 17, 2024, where Trindade won by first-round technical knockout after forcing three counts.

Trindade faced Abraham Vidales at Glory 93 on July 20, 2024. He won the fight by unanimous decision.

Trindade faced YA-MAN at RISE ELDORADO 2025 on March 29, 2025. He won the fight by a third-round technical knockout.

Trindade challenged Petpanomrung Kiatmuu9 for the Glory Featherweight Championship at Glory 100 on June 14, 2025. He lost the fight by unanimous decision.

Trindade was scheduled to face Bobo Sacko at Glory 104 on October 11, 2025, but missed weight prior to the bout. The fight with Sacko was cancelled, and he instead faced Khalil Kütükcü at a 74 kilogram catchweight on one days notice. He would win via unanimous decision, dropping Kütükcü twice throughout the bout.

== Titles and accomplishments ==
=== Professional ===
- International Sport Kickboxing Association
  - 2021 ISKA Muay Thai European Super Lightweight (−63.5 kg) Champion
- Mamba Fight Club
  - 2023 MFC Muay Thai World −67 kg Champion
- World Association of Kickboxing Organizations
  - 2023 WAKO Pro K-1 European Super Lightweight (−64.5 kg) Champion
- Glory/RISE
  - 2024 Glory RISE Featherweight Grand Prix Runner-up
  - 2026 Glory Featherweight Championship

=== Awards ===
- Combat Press
  - 2024 Combat Press "Knockout of the Year" (vs. Chadd Collins)
- Beyond Kickboxing
  - Beyond Kickboxing's 2024 Breakthrough Fighter of the Year
  - Beyond Kickboxing's 2024 Knockout of the Year (vs. Chadd Collins)

=== Amateur ===
- World Association of Kickboxing Organizations
  - 2017 WAKO European Championships Younger Junior −60 kg (bronze)
  - 2018 WAKO World Championships Older Junior −60 kg (gold)
  - 2019 WAKO European Championships Older Junior −63.5 kg (gold)
- International Federation of Muaythai Associations
  - 2016 IFMA World Championships Junior (14–15) 57 kg (silver)
  - 2017 IFMA European Championships Junior (16–17) 60 kg (gold)
  - 2018 IFMA European Championships Junior (16–17) 60 kg (gold)
  - 2018 IFMA World Youth Championships Junior (16–17) 60 kg (bronze)
  - 2022 IFMA European Championships U23 67 kg (bronze)
- International Combat Organisation
  - 2019 ICO Full Contact −62.5 kg World Champion

== Fight record ==
Professional Muay Thai and Kickboxing Record
22 Wins (14 (T)KO's), 5 Losses, 0 Draw
Date	Result	Opponent	Event	Location	Method	Round	Time
2026-10-17	Win	(Turkey) Deniz Demirkapu	Glory 110	Antwerp, Belgium	TKO (3 knockdowns)	3	1:33
Won the vacant Glory Featherweight Championship.
2026-06-06	Loss	(Thailand) Petpanomrung Kiatmuu9	RISE World Series 2026 - Glory - Last Featherweight Standing Semifinals	Tokyo, Japan	Decision (majority)	3	3:00
2026-03-28	Win	(Albania) Berjan Peposhi	Glory 106 - Last Featherweight Standing Quarterfinals	Tokyo, Japan	Ext.R Decision (unanimous)	4	3:00
2025-12-13	Win	(France) Bobo Sacko	Glory Collision 8 - Last Featherweight Standing Second Round	Arnhem, Netherlands	Decision (unanimous)	3	3:00
2025-10-11	Win	(Turkey) Khalil Kütükcü	Glory 104	Rotterdam, Netherlands	Decision (unanimous)	3	3:00
2025-06-14	Loss	(Thailand) Petpanomrung Kiatmuu9	Glory 100	Rotterdam, Netherlands	Decision (unanimous)	5	3:00
For the Glory Featherweight Championship.
2025-03-29	Win	(Japan) YA-MAN	RISE ELDORADO 2025	Tokyo, Japan	TKO (corner stoppage)	3	0:43
2024-12-21	Loss	(Thailand) Petpanomrung Kiatmuu9	GLORY RISE Featherweight Grand Prix, Final	Chiba, Japan	Decision (split)	3	3:00
For the 2024 Glory RISE Featherweight Grand Prix title.
2024-12-21	Win	(Australia) Chadd Collins	GLORY RISE Featherweight Grand Prix, Semifinals	Chiba, Japan	TKO (2 knockdowns)	1	1:02
2024-12-21	Win	(Japan) Kento Haraguchi	GLORY RISE Featherweight Grand Prix, Quarterfinals	Chiba, Japan	KO (right cross)	1	2:59
2024-07-20	Win	(Mexico) Abraham Vidales	Glory 93	Rotterdam, Netherlands	Decision (unanimous)	3	3:00
2024-03-17	Win	(Australia) Chadd Collins	RISE ELDORADO 2024	Tokyo, Japan	TKO (3 knockdowns)	1	1:35
2023-12-23	Loss	(Albania) Berjan Peposhi	Glory 90	Rotterdam, Netherlands	Decision (split)	3	3:00
2023-09-22	Win	(Thailand) Sibmuen Sitchefboontham	ONE Friday Fights 34	Bangkok, Thailand	KO (left hook to the body)	1	2:14
2023-07-18	Loss	(Cambodia) Phal Sophorn	Techo Santepheap Kun Khmer World Champion	Phnom Penh, Cambodia	Decision	3	3:00
2023-07-08	Win	(France) Valentin Irace	Brothers League XIV	Lisbon, Portugal	Decision (unanimous)	5	3:00
Won the vacant WAKO Pro K-1 European Super Lightweight (−64.5 kg) title.
2023-05-27	Win	(Lithuania) Deividas Danyla	Blade Fights	Klaipėda, Lithuania	Decision (unanimous)	3	3:00
2023-04-22	Win	(Thailand) PTT Petchrungruang	THAI FIGHT Rome	Rome, Italy	KO (left hook)	1	0:37
2023-02-25	Win	(Mexico) Luis Javier	MFC Showdown 026: Spain vs Mexico	Mexico City, Mexico	KO (high kick)	1	0:15
Won the MFC Muay Thai World −67kg title.
2023-02-11	Win	(Italy) Kebrome Neguse	UAM Fight Night K1 Pro	Dubai, United Arab Emirates	Decision (unanimous)	3	3:00
2021-12-18	Win	(France) Victor Bordage	MFC Showdown 016	Ponferrada, Spain	TKO (doctor stoppage)	2	
Won the vacant ISKA Muay Thai European Super Lightweight (−63.5 kg) title.
2021-11-20	Win	(Spain) Saad Saadoun	K-1 Slam	Bilbao, Spain	TKO (corner stoppage)	3	
2021-09-05	Win	(Spain) Diego Serrano	MFC Showdown 014	Ponferrada, Spain	KO (left hook to the body)	1	
2021-06-05	Win	(Spain) Pedrito Ruiz	MFC Showdown 012	Ponferrada, Spain	Decision	5	3:00
2021-04-24	Win	(Spain) José María Quevedo	MFC Showdown 011	Ponferrada, Spain	TKO (doctor stoppage)	2	
2020-09-13	Win	(Spain) Gorka Caro	MFC Showdown 009	Ponferrada, Spain	KO (knee to the body)	2	2:44
2020-08-01	Win	(Spain) Pelayo Ventoso	MFC Showdown 008	Ponferrada, Spain	KO (elbow)	3	
Legend: Win Loss Draw/No contest Notes

Amateur Muay Thai and Kickboxing Record
44 Wins, 5 Losses
Date	Result	Opponent	Event	Location	Method	Round	Time
2022-02-18	Win	(Russia) Nikon Egorov	IFMA European Championships 2022, U23 Quarterfinal	Istanbul, Turkey	Decision (29:28)	3	3:00
Trindade withdrew from the tournament due to injury. Wins 2022 IFMA European Championships U23 -67kg Bronze Medal.
2022-02-14	Win	(Cyprus) Christoforos Kesidis	IFMA European Championships 2022, U23 Second round	Istanbul, Turkey	Walk over		
2019-08-	Win	(Ukraine) Oleksandr Yefimenko	WAKO Cadets and Juniors European Championships 2019, Final	Győr, Hungary	Decision (2:1)	3	2:00
Wins 2019 WAKO Cadets and Juniors European Championships Older Junior −63.5 kg Gold Medal.
2019-08-	Win	(Russia) Samir Novruzov	WAKO Cadets and Juniors European Championships 2019, Semifinal	Győr, Hungary	Decision (3:0)	3	2:00
2019-08-	Win	(Moldova) Artiom Orlovschi	WAKO Cadets and Juniors European Championships 2019, Quarterfinal	Győr, Hungary	Decision (3:0)	3	2:00
2019-07-25	Loss	(Thailand) Krisada Takhiankliang	IFMA World Championships 2019, U23 Quarterfinal	Bangkok, Thailand	Decision (30:27)	3	3:00
2019-07-24	Win	(China) Zhiyang Cao	IFMA World Championships 2019, U23 Second round	Bangkok, Thailand	Decision (29:28)	3	3:00
2019-07-22	Win	(Vietnam) Huong The Nguyen	IFMA World Championships 2019, U23 First round	Bangkok, Thailand	Decision (30:27)	3	3:00
2019-06-08	Win	(Portugal) Leandro Sancadas	Fighting Championship Events	Lisbon, Portugal	KO	2	
2019-05-12	Win	(United Kingdom) Marley Mason	Medway Mayhem Fights Series 2	England	Decision (Unanimous)	5	2:00
Wins the vacant ICO Full Contact −62.5 kg World title.
2018-09-	Win	(Russia) Magomed Makhmaev	WAKO Cadets and Juniors World Championships 2018, Final	Jesolo, Italy	Decision (3:0)	3	2:00
Wins 2018 WAKO Cadets and Juniors World Championships Older Junior −60kg Gold Medal.
2018-09-	Win	(Poland) Adrian Gunia	WAKO Cadets and Juniors World Championships 2018, Semi-final	Jesolo, Italy	Decision (3:0)	3	2:00
2018-09-	Win	(Russia) Georgii Kudrenko	WAKO Cadets and Juniors World Championships 2018, Quarterfinal	Jesolo, Italy	Decision (2:1)	3	2:00
2018-08-07	Loss	(Belarus) Danila Kvach	IFMA World Youth Championships 2018, Semi-final	Bangkok, Thailand	KO (Left hook)	2	
Wins 2018 IFMA World Youth Championships Junior (16–17) 60kg Bronze Medal.
2018-08-06	Win	(Kazakhstan) Khasan Aliyev	IFMA World Youth Championships 2018, Quarterfinal	Bangkok, Thailand	Decision (30:27)	3	3:00
2018-08-05	Win	(Malaysia) Ha Ze Xiang	IFMA World Youth Championships 2018, Second round final	Bangkok, Thailand	Decision (30:27)	3	3:00
2018-07-05	Win	(Turkey) Mehmet Tecir	IFMA European Championships 2018, Final	Prague, Czech Republic	Decision (30:27)	3	3:00
Wins 2018 IFMA European Championships Junior (16–17) 60kg Gold Medal.
2018-07-03	Win	(Armenia) Razmik Grigoryan	IFMA European Championships 2018, Semi-final	Prague, Czech Republic	KO	2	
2017-10-20	Win	(Israel) Daniel Doroshenko	IFMA European Championships 2017, Final	Paris, France	Decision (30:27)	3	3:00
Wins 2017 IFMA European Championships Junior (16–17) 60kg Gold Medal.
2017-10-18	Win	(France) Houssain Oubairouk	IFMA European Championships 2017, Semi-final	Paris, France	Decision (30:25)	3	3:00
2017-09-	Loss	(Russia) Islamgerei Kadiev	WAKO Cadets and Juniors European Championships 2017, Semi-final	Skopje, North Macedonia	Decision (3:0)	3	2:00
Wins 2017 WAKO Cadets and Juniors European Championships Younger Junior −60kg Bronze Medal.
2017-09-	Win	(France) Darren Lavielle	WAKO Cadets and Juniors European Championships 2017, Quarterfinal	Skopje, North Macedonia	Decision (3:0)	3	2:00
2017-08-06	Loss	(Russia) Aik Begian	IFMA World Youth Championships 2017, Second round	Bangkok, Thailand	Decision (30:27)	3	3:00
2017-08-05	Win	(United Arab Emirates) Ibrahim Feruz	IFMA World Youth Championships 2017, First round	Bangkok, Thailand	Decision (28:29)	3	3:00
2016-08-31	Loss	(Thailand) Natreeyot Ruesee	IFMA World Championships 2016, Final	Bangkok, Thailand	Decision (30:27)	3	3:00
Wins 2016 IFMA World Championships Junior (14–15) 57kg Silver Medal.
2016-08-29	Win	(New Zealand) Gvonl Ashloy	IFMA World Championships 2016, Semi-final	Bangkok, Thailand	Decision (30:29)	3	3:00
2016-08-28	Win	(Egypt) Youssef Kandel	IFMA World Championships 2016, Quarterfinal	Bangkok, Thailand	Decision (29:27)	3	3:00
Legend: Win Loss Draw/No contest Notes
