= Jon J. Franklin =

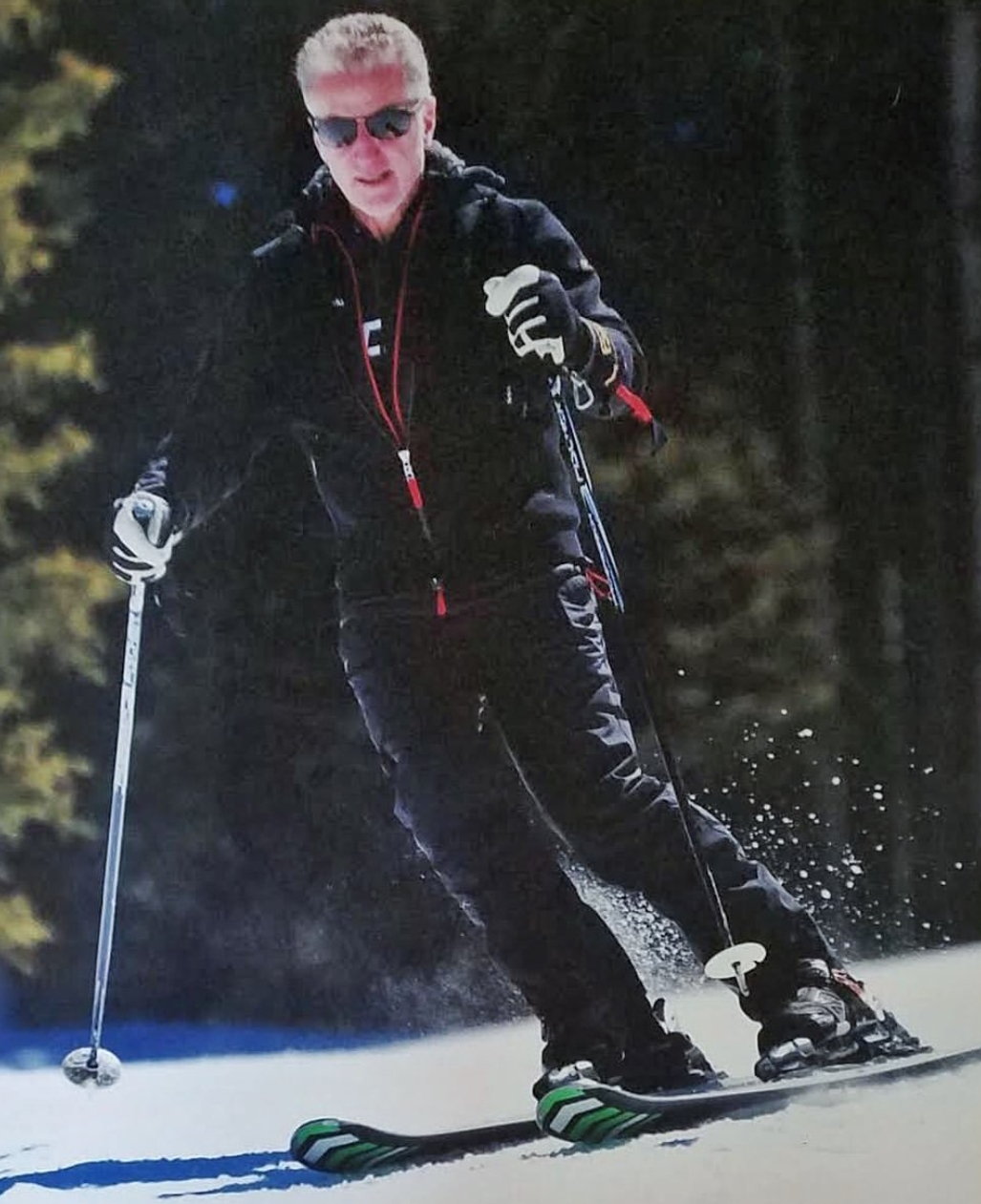
Jon J Franklin WPST CEO, Aspen

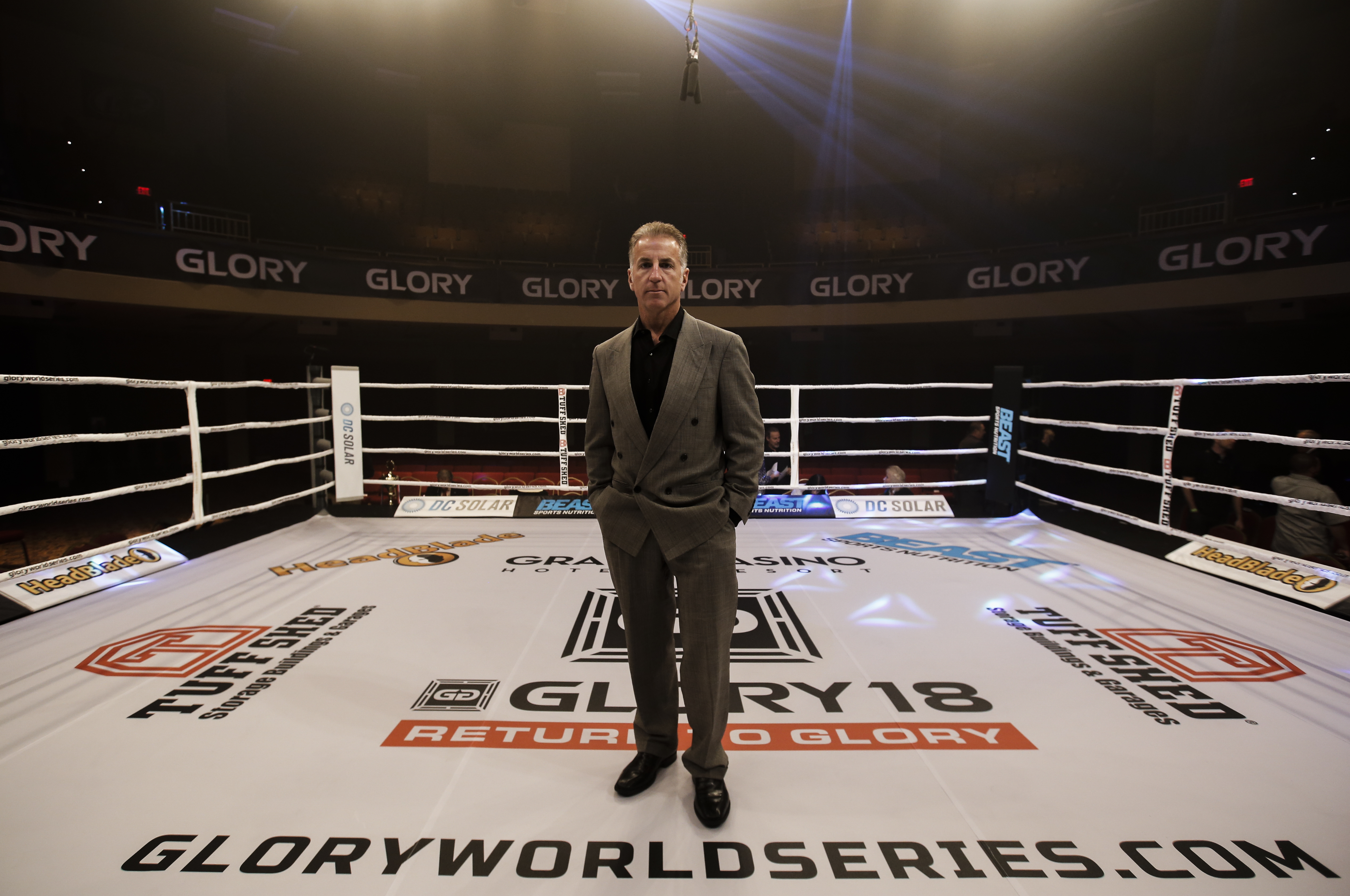
Jon J. Franklin GLORY 18

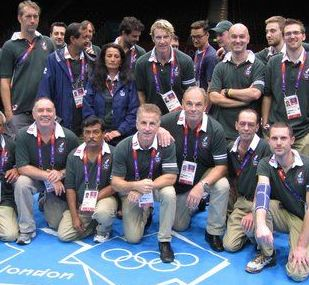
Jon J Franklin, London Olympics Boxing Supervisor with Broadcast team in ring.

Jon J Franklin (aka "Jon Franklin") is a sports marketing, combat sports, and sports television business executive. Was 2025 Promoter for Glory Kickboxing Underground Miami fights. And in 2025 brought in "Only Fans", "Clear Fruit" and "Tuff Shed" to support Salita Promotions and professional boxers. Franklin was Chief Executive Officer of the revitalized World Pro Ski Tour through 2024 and Chief Executive Officer of "Ski Racing Media" through 2022. The World Pro Ski Tour, begun in 1968, is the world's number one professional head to head dual format ski race tour. Through 2018, Franklin was CEO of Glory Sports International, the parent company of Glory Kickboxing that was seen on ESPN in the USA along with UFC Fightpass and Veronica/SBS Holland and others in more than 170 countries. Franklin began working with Glory in 2012 and joined full time as CEO in 2014. Under Franklin's leadership in 2017 Glory was named the World's leading Kickboxing promotion by Combat Press and one of the World's most influential combat sports promotions by Fox Sports that same year (Along with the UFC and Bellator). As Glory CEO Franklin brought investment from Liberty Global, Yao Capital and others to Glory Sports. Franklin continued at Glory as USA Promoter and Chief Development Officer in 2018 and early 2019. In this role he secured Monster Energy as Glory's first Global sponsor. From 1999 through 2002 Franklin was President of Golden Gloves boxing. He currently serves on the boards of the World Pro Ski Tour, the Sports and Entertainment Company and other sports related entities. To be noted, Jon J Franklin has been a strong supporter of women's sports at the highest levels, having brought female fighters into Golden Gloves during his tenure as President, matched top female boxers on PPV cards at America Presents, started a women's division of Glory Kickboxing while he was CEO and in 2022 brought women's ski racing into the World Pro Ski Tour with equal pay racing the same courses as the men.

== Career ==
Prior to Glory, Franklin was a Vice President of IMG Media, President of Golden Gloves LLC Boxing, President of a division of America Presents - Boxing, and President of The Sports and Entertainment Company (Sports-EntCo). At IMG Media for 15 years, Franklin ran the Winter and Olympic Sports divisions and managed a number of Olympic and World Champion athletes. In addition Franklin sold and managed the Ski World Cup title sponsorship activation program for Cafe de Colombia and Swatch Watch and brought in numerous sponsors to the World Pro Ski Tour (US Pro Ski Tour). At that time he led the charge to bring Olympic Gold and Silver medalist skiers, Phil and Steve Mahre back to Pro Ski Racing under a major Coors Light sponsorship. While at IMG, Franklin was also part of the team that developed the Stars on Ice and Symphony on Ice tours along with other skating properties. Running Sports-EntCo for 13 years, Franklin concluded significant sponsorship deals for Olympic athletes such as Bode Miller and Julia Mancuso and managed various global sports marketing programs for companies such as Barilla Pasta and Rip It Energy Fuel. Franklin was the promoter of X Games Champion skateboarder Danny Way's world-renowned jump over the Great Wall of China in conjunction with Quicksilver brands. As President of Golden Gloves Marketing LLC, Franklin promoted the Golden Gloves National Championships in the early 2000s bringing it back to national television (on Fox Sports) after a 20-year lapse. In addition he brought in the US Army as Golden Gloves title sponsor. Franklin produced Golden Gloves Nationals Television as late as 2010 and helped market and promote USA Boxing's National Championship in Denver in 2009. Franklin was also Executive Producer of the 2011 Pre-Olympic test Boxing World Championships from the Excel Center in London. While at America Presents Franklin was part of the team that promoted Mike Tyson fights from Francis Botha through Brian Nielsen. At that time he also managed fights for the Fox Sunday Night Fights and promoted a number of pay-per-view events including David Reid v Felix Trinidad (in conjunction with Don King Productions). In 2014 and 2015 with Sports-EntCo, Franklin executive produced television events for Iron Mike Tyson Productions for international syndication along with Fox and Spike Networks. This followed the promotion and television production of over 30 International WSB inaugural professional boxing matches on Versus and NBC Sports Network initially for IMG Media and later for the governing body of Olympic boxing.

== Olympics ==
Summer: At the 2008 Summer Olympic in Beijing China, Franklin worked with IMG Media to announce the World Series of Boxing programs opening the door for professional boxers to retain Olympic eligibility. At the 2012 Summer Olympics in London, Franklin served as Broadcast Supervisor for boxing for the International Olympic Committee's Olympic Broadcast Services (OBS). Franklin has also been a consultant to IMG Media working with the Olympic governing body of boxing and the IOC, designing a plan to help bring professional boxers to the 2016 Olympics. In 1995 Franklin worked with the International Waterski Federation in an attempt to add waterskiing to the Olympic Games. This included a waterski demonstration for the IOC Executive Committee in Seville Spain.

Winter: While at IMG- Media and later with Sports-EntCo, Franklin worked with athletes and managed sponsor programs at every Winter Olympics from the 1988 Calgary Winter Olympics through to the 2006 Italy Winter Olympics.

== Personal ==
Franklin, an INT slalom waterski competitor, was the television analyst for the Waterski World Cup for Versus Television and Outdoor Life Networks through the 1990s.

In the course of his television production career, Franklin has won numerous television awards including Telly and Aurora awards for TV production for sport shows on Fox, ESPN, CBS and other networks.
