= TwinFocus Capital Partners =

American private investment firm

- Company type: Private company
- Industry: Financial services
- Founded: 2006; 20 years ago
- Founders: Paul and Wesley Karger
- Headquarters: Boston, Massachusetts, United States
- Area served: Worldwide
- Services: Multi family office
- AUM: $7.9 billion assets under advisory (2023)
- Website: twinfocus.com

TwinFocus Capital Partners (known as TwinFocus) is an American multi family office and private investment firm based in Boston, Massachusetts. The company was started in 2006 by twin brothers Paul and Wesley Karger.

As of 2019, TwinFocus had a 40-person team and represented more than 45 family office clients around the world with individual balance sheets totaling at least $100 million. The company manages a diverse array of asset classes including stocks, bonds, mutual funds, private equity and real estate. As of 2023, TwinFocus reported $7.9 billion in assets under advisory.

== History ==
The company was started in 2006 by twin brothers Paul and Wesley Karger.

In October 2018, TwinFocus opened its London office in Mayfair, an affluent area in the city's West End. In early 2019, TwinFocus helped its founding European client, Markerstudy Group, facilitate the £185 million acquisition of Co-op Insurance. Shortly thereafter, the firm introduced formal M&A and real estate advisory services for its global ultra-high net worth client base.

TwinFocus is also present in Latin America and Asia, working with entrepreneurs with substantial cash holdings. The company's main competitors in Asia include Morgan Stanley, Merrill Lynch, and Goldman Sachs.
