= Glory (kickboxing) =

World-wide kickboxing promotion

GLORY
- Type: Private
- Industry: Kickboxing
- Founded: 2012
- Headquarters: London, United Kingdom
- Key people: Pierre Andurand (Chairman), Marshall Zelaznik (CEO), Robbie Timmers, Gyp Tessier (Matchmakers)
- Owner: GSUKCO Limited
- Website: www.glorykickboxing.com

Glory (formerly Glory World Series) is an international kickboxing promotion founded in 2012. It is owned by Pierre Andurand, and other investors.

== Background ==
When K-1 began suffering from extreme financial difficulties in 2011, Total Sports Asia, TSA CEO Marcus Luer, Pierre Andurand, and Scott Rudmann of Nectar Capital attempted to buy the brand. K-1 was instead sold to Mike Kim and EMCOM Entertainment Inc.

In the aftermath, Pierre Andurand, Scott Rudmann and TSA decided to start a brand new kickboxing promotion and acquired United Glory, Golden Glory, and It's Showtime to secure a top event production team and contracts to each promotion's top fighters. Forming the Glory World Series, Pierre Andurand was named chairman and Rudmann was named vice-chairman. A number of people formerly involved with these three entities event became Glory consultants.

Glory World Series signed most of the world's top kickboxers, such as Peter Aerts, Remy Bonjasky, Semmy Schilt, Gokhan Saki, Daniel Ghiţă, Albert Kraus, and Giorgio Petrosyan.

== History ==
The company includes a mix of entrepreneurs and senior level executives from different environments. The company's current investors include Pierre Andurand, Scott Rudmann and Nectar Capital and Yao Capital. Former investors have been Liberty Global, and TwinFocus Capital Partners.

In February 2013, Glory announced that former WWE Executive VP Andrew Whitaker had been hired as the global CEO of Glory Sports International. In August, 2014 Andrew Whitaker moved into an advisory role within GLORY and Jon J. Franklin was appointed as the new CEO. Under Franklin's leadership Glory was named the Number one kickboxing league in the world by Combat Press and one of the three most important global combat sports leagues by Fox Sports (along with the UFC and Bellator).

In 2018, Glory announced that former CEO Jon J. Franklin had moved to the role of Chief Development Officer, and former UFC executive Marshall Zelaznik had been hired as the new CEO.

On May 15, 2020, Glory announced Zelaznik had resigned as Glory CEO.

=== Financial hardships and change of ownership ===
On May 26, 2020, Glory Sports International went into receivership, and soon after ownership of Glory was transferred to London-based GSUKCO Limited.

Rudmann is the Executive Vice-chairman, running the league since it was taken over by GSUKCO.

In a press release on October 2, 2023, Glory announced that Maurice Hols was named as the new executive director. Citing "different vision of the future of the organization" with Executive Vice Chairman Rudmann, Hols resigned on February 19, 2024, after just a few months as executive director.

In March 2024, it was announced by Glory that Zelaznik returned to the company and was appointed again as CEO.

=== Media coverage ===
In June 2013, after having its first U.S. event in New York, Glory 9: New York on June 22, 2013, Spike TV signed a multi-year agreement to broadcast Glory kickboxing events; their partnership began with Glory 11: Chicago on October 12 of that year. The broadcast deal with Spike was extended in May 2014 to cover 2015.

In February 2016, Glory CEO Jon J. Franklin announced a new multi-year deal with ESPN.

Glory was broadcast on Veronica TV in the Netherlands from July, 2018 to February, 2020.

Beginning in 2019, Glory initiated a partnership with the UFC for the former's events to be exclusively carried in the U.S. by UFC Fight Pass. The first event to be broadcast as part of this partnership was Glory 63: Houston on February 1 and the last event was Glory 75: Utrecht on February 29, 2020.

Events from Glory 76 to Glory 80 Studio were available through pay-per-view.

28 June 2022 Glory announced a multi-year broadcast deal with Videoland in the Netherlands. The deal covered all Glory events starting from Glory 81: Ben Saddik vs. Adegbuyi 2. The last event broadcast by Videoland was Glory 98 headlined by Jamal Ben Saddik vs Uku Jürjendal.

On 16 February 2024 a multi-year broadcast deal with DAZN for most global viewers was announced.

On 6 January 2026, Talpa's OTT streaming platform KIJK become the new broadcaster of Glory in the Netherlands also replacing the previous global broadcaster DAZN after the DAZN's Glory broadcasting rights contract expired in the end of 2025. At the same time, Flipps Media's OTT streaming platform Triller TV also have the new broadcaster of Glory for global viewers (outside of the Netherlands).

It was announced on 1 September, 2026 that Combate would again broadcast Glory events till the end of 2027. The partnership resumes with the broadcast of Glory 109.

=== Glory Rivals ===
In January 2022 Glory announced a new series of events called Glory Rivals, jointly promoted with regional promotions. The first Rivals event with Enfusion was scheduled for May 21, 2022, at the Lotto Arena in Antwerp, Belgium. The event was later cancelled due to the finances of Enfusion's local promoter partner Antwerp Fight Organization catching the attention of Belgian authorities.

Glory Rivals 1 was instead held on June 11, 2022, in Alkmaar, Netherlands. In the main event Luis Tavares defeated Florent Kaouachi by knockout in the third round.

Glory Rivals 2 was held on September 17, 2022, in Alkmaar, Netherlands.

Glory Rivals 3 was organized at Sporthallen Zuid in Amsterdam on November 5, 2022. Ibrahim El Bouni defeated Muhammed Balli by knock-out in the first round.

Glory Rivals 4 took place on December 25 at Ryogoku Sumo Arena in Tokyo, Japan, in collaboration with Rise and Shoot boxing. Kento Haraguchi defeated Serhii Adamchuk by unanimous decision.

Glory Rivals 5 was organized on January 28, 2023, at Zamna Tulum Hotel in Tulum, Mexico, in collaboration with War of Nations. Abraham Vidales defeated Tomás Aguirre by Unanimous Decision. On January 11, 2024, it was announced that Glory and RISE would hold joint tournaments, combine their rankings and unify their rankings. A few days later, on February 6, the promotion put their lightweight and women's super bantamweight divisions on hold.

Glory Rivals 6 is currently scheduled for November 28, 2026, at Maaspoort in Dan Bosch, Netherlands.

== Events ==
=== Glory events ===
#	Event	Date	Venue	Location	Attendance
135	Glory Collision 10	December 12, 2026	Gelredome	Arnhem, Netherlands	
134	Glory Rivals 6	November 28, 2026	Maaspoort	Den Bosch, Netherlands	
133	Glory 110	October 17, 2026	Lotto Arena	Antwerp, Belgium	
132	Glory 109	September 5, 2026	RTM Stage	Rotterdam, Netherlands	
131	Glory Collision 9	June 13, 2026	Rotterdam Ahoy	Rotterdam, Netherlands	12.000
130	Glory 108	June 6, 2026	Ota City General Gymnasium	Tokyo, Japan	
129	Glory 107	April 25, 2026	RTM Stage	Rotterdam, Netherlands	
128	Glory 106	March 28, 2026	Ryōgoku Kokugikan	Tokyo, Japan	
127	Glory 105	February 7, 2026	Gelredome	Arnhem, Netherlands	12.000
126	Glory Collision 8	December 13, 2025	Gelredome	Arnhem, Netherlands	8.000
125	Glory 104	October 11, 2025	RTM Stage	Rotterdam, Netherlands	
124	Glory 103	August 23, 2025	Rotterdam Ahoy	Rotterdam, Netherlands	
123	Glory 102	August 2, 2025	Ota City General Gymnasium	Tokyo, Japan	
122	Glory 101	June 21, 2025	Yokohama Buntai	Yokohama, Japan	
121	Glory 100	June 14, 2025	Rotterdam Ahoy	Rotterdam, Netherlands	12.000
120	Glory Underground	May 1, 2025	Betr HQ	Miami, USA	
119	Glory 99	April 5, 2025	Rotterdam Ahoy	Rotterdam, Netherlands	
118	Glory 98	February 22, 2025	RTM Stage	Rotterdam, Netherlands	
117	GLORY RISE Featherweight Grand Prix	December 21, 2024	Makuhari Messe	Chiba, Japan	
116	Glory Collision 7	December 7, 2024	Gelredome	Arnhem, Netherlands	22.000
115	Glory 96	October 12, 2024	RTM Stage	Rotterdam, Netherlands	
114	Glory 95	September 21, 2024	Arena Zagreb	Zagreb, Croatia	
114	Glory 94	August 31, 2024	Lotto Arena	Antwerp, Belgium	
112	Glory 93	July 20, 2024	Topsportcentrum Rotterdam	Rotterdam, Netherlands	
111	Glory Light Heavyweight Grand Prix	June 8, 2024	Rotterdam Ahoy	Rotterdam, Netherlands	
110	Glory 92	May 18, 2024	RTM Stage	Rotterdam, Netherlands	
109	Glory 91	April 27, 2024	Dôme de Paris	Paris, France	
108	Glory Heavyweight Grand Prix	March 9, 2024	Gelredome	Arnhem, Netherlands	
107	Glory 90	December 23, 2023	Rotterdam Ahoy	Rotterdam, Netherlands	
106	Glory Collision 6	November 4, 2023	Gelredome	Arnhem, Netherlands	20.000
105	Glory 89	October 7, 2023	Arena Burgas	Burgas, Bulgaria	
104	Glory 88	September 9, 2023	Dôme de Paris	Paris, France	
103	Glory 87	August 19, 2023	Rotterdam Ahoy	Rotterdam, Netherlands	
102	Glory Collision 5	June 17, 2023	Rotterdam Ahoy	Rotterdam, Netherlands	
101	Glory 86	May 27, 2023	Grugahalle	Essen, Germany	
100	Glory 85	April 29, 2023	Rotterdam Ahoy	Rotterdam, Netherlands	
99	Glory 84	March 11, 2023	Topsportcentrum Rotterdam	Rotterdam, Netherlands	
98	Glory 83	February 11, 2023	Grugahalle	Essen, Germany	
97	Glory Rivals 5	January 28, 2023	Zamna Tulum	Tulum, Mexico	
96	Glory Rivals 4	December 25, 2022	Ryōgoku Kokugikan	Tokyo, Japan	
95	Glory 82	November 19, 2022	Maritim Hotel	Bonn, Germany	
94	Glory Rivals 3	November 5, 2022	Sporthallen Zuid	Amsterdam, Netherlands	
93	Glory Collision 4	October 8, 2022	GelreDome	Arnhem, Netherlands	
92	Glory Rivals 2	September 17, 2022	De Meent	Alkmaar, Netherlands	
91	Glory 81	August 20, 2022	Castello Düsseldorf	Düsseldorf, Germany	
90	Glory Rivals 1	June 11, 2022	Zwembad Hoornse Vaart	Alkmaar, Netherlands	
89	Glory 80 Studio	May 14, 2022	Sportcentrum Valken Huizen	Arnhem, Netherlands	
88	Glory 80: Hasselt	March 19, 2022	Trixxo Arena	Hasselt, Belgium	
87	Glory Collision 3	October 23, 2021	GelreDome	Arnhem, Netherlands	18,000
86	Glory 78: Rotterdam	September 4, 2021	Rotterdam Ahoy	Rotterdam, Netherlands	
85	Glory 77: Rotterdam	January 30, 2021	Rotterdam Ahoy	Rotterdam, Netherlands	
84	Glory 76: Rotterdam	December 19, 2020	Rotterdam Ahoy	Rotterdam, Netherlands	
83	Glory 75: Utrecht	February 29, 2020	Central Studios	Utrecht, Netherlands	
82	Glory Collision 2	December 21, 2019	GelreDome	Arnhem, Netherlands	31,000
81	Glory 73: Shenzhen	December 7, 2019	Nanshan Culture & Sports Center	Shenzhen, China	
80	Glory 72: Chicago	November 23, 2019	Wintrust Arena	Chicago, Illinois, United States	
79	Glory 71: Chicago	November 22, 2019	Wintrust Arena	Chicago, Illinois, United States	
78	Glory 70: Lyon	October 26, 2019	Palais des Sports de Gerland	Lyon, France	
77	Glory 69: Düsseldorf	October 12, 2019	ISS Dome	Düsseldorf, Germany	
76	Glory 68: Miami	September 28, 2019	James L Knight Center	Miami, Florida, United States	
75	Glory 67: Orlando	July 5, 2019	Silver Spurs Arena	Orlando, Florida, United States	
74	Glory 66: Paris	June 22, 2019	Zénith Paris	Paris, France	
73	Glory 65: Utrecht	May 17, 2019	Central Studios	Utrecht, Netherlands	
72	Glory 64: Strasbourg	March 9, 2019	Rhénus Sport	Strasbourg, France	
71	Glory 63: Houston	February 1, 2019	Arena Place	Houston, Texas, United States	
70	Glory 62: Rotterdam	December 1, 2018	Rotterdam Ahoy	Rotterdam, Netherlands	
69	Glory 61: New York	November 2, 2018	Hammerstein Ballroom	New York City, New York, United States	
68	Glory 60: Lyon	October 20, 2018	Palais des Sports de Gerland	Lyon, France	
67	Glory 59: Amsterdam	September 29, 2018	Johan Cruyff Arena	Amsterdam, Netherlands	
66	Glory 58: Chicago	September 15, 2018	Sears Centre Arena	Hoffman Estates, Illinois, United States	
65	Glory 57: Shenzhen	August 25, 2018	Shenzhen Bay Sports Center	Shenzhen, China	
64	Glory 56: Denver	August 10, 2018	1stBank Center	Broomfield, Colorado, United States	
63	Glory 55: New York	July 20, 2018	The Theater at Madison Square Garden	New York City, New York, United States	
62	Glory 54: Birmingham	June 2, 2018	Genting Arena	Birmingham, England	
61	Glory 53: Lille	May 12, 2018	Zénith de Lille	Lille, France	
60	Glory 52: Los Angeles	March 31, 2018	Long Beach Convention and Entertainment Center	Long Beach, California, United States	
59	Glory 51: Rotterdam	March 3, 2018	Rotterdam Ahoy	Rotterdam, Netherlands	
58	Glory 50: Chicago	February 16, 2018	UIC Pavilion	Chicago, Illinois, United States	
57	Glory 49: Rotterdam	December 9, 2017	Rotterdam Ahoy	Rotterdam, Netherlands	
56	Glory 48: New York	December 1, 2017	The Theater at Madison Square Garden	New York City, New York, United States	
55	Glory 47: Lyon	October 28, 2017	Palais des Sports de Gerland	Lyon, France	
54	Glory 46: China	October 14, 2017	Guangzhou Gymnasium	Guangzhou, China	
53	Glory 45: Amsterdam	September 30, 2017	Sporthallen Zuid	Amsterdam, Netherlands	
52	Glory 44: Chicago	August 25, 2017	Sears Centre	Hoffman Estates, Illinois, United States	
51	Glory 43: New York	July 14, 2017	The Theater at Madison Square Garden	New York City, New York, United States	
50	Glory 42: Paris	June 10, 2017	AccorHotels Arena	Paris, France	
49	Glory 41: Holland	May 20, 2017	Brabanthallen 's-Hertogenbosch	's-Hertogenbosch, Netherlands	5,000
48	Glory 40: Copenhagen	April 29, 2017	Forum Copenhagen	Copenhagen, Denmark	2,500
47	Glory 39: Brussels	March 25, 2017	Forest National	Brussels, Belgium	1,500
46	Road to Glory UK 65 kg Tournament	March 11, 2017	Grantham Meres Leisure Centre	Grantham, England	
45	Glory 38: Chicago	February 24, 2017	Sears Centre	Hoffman Estates, Illinois, United States	
44	Glory 37: Los Angeles	January 20, 2017	The Novo by Microsoft	Los Angeles, California, United States	
43	Glory 36: Oberhausen	December 10, 2016	König Pilsener Arena	Oberhausen, Germany	13,000
42	Glory 35: Nice	November 5, 2016	Palais Nikaïa	Nice, France	
41	Glory 34: Denver	October 21, 2016	1stBank Center	Broomfield, Colorado, United States	
40	Glory 33: New Jersey	September 9, 2016	Sun National Bank Center	Trenton, New Jersey, United States	
39	Glory 32: Virginia	July 22, 2016	Ted Constant Convocation Center	Norfolk, Virginia, United States	
38	Glory 31: Amsterdam	June 25, 2016	Amsterdam RAI Exhibition and Convention Centre	Amsterdam, Netherlands	3,500
37	Glory 30: Los Angeles	May 13, 2016	Citizens Business Bank Arena	Ontario, California, United States	1,750
36	Glory 29: Copenhagen	April 16, 2016	Forum Copenhagen	Copenhagen, Denmark	1,250
35	Glory 28: Paris	March 12, 2016	AccorHotels Arena	Paris, France	2,750
34	Glory 27: Chicago	February 26, 2016	Sears Centre	Hoffman Estates, Illinois, United States	2,000
33	Glory 26: Amsterdam	December 4, 2015	Amsterdam RAI Exhibition and Convention Centre	Amsterdam, Netherlands	8,000
32	Glory 25: Milan	November 6, 2015	PalaIper	Milan, Italy	6,750
31	Glory 24: Denver	October 9, 2015	Magness Arena	Denver, Colorado, United States	3,500
30	Bellator/Glory: Dynamite 1	September 19, 2015	SAP Center	San Jose, California, United States	11,000
29	Glory 23: Las Vegas	August 3, 2015	Hard Rock Hotel and Casino	Las Vegas, Nevada, United States	2,200
28	Glory 22: Lille	June 5, 2015	Stade Pierre-Mauroy	Lille, France	6,500
27	Glory 21: San Diego	May 8, 2015	Valley View Casino Center	San Diego, California, United States	1,500
26	Glory 20: Dubai	April 3, 2015	Dubai World Trade Centre	Dubai, United Arab Emirates	1,000
25	Glory 19: Virginia	February 6, 2015	Hampton Coliseum	Hampton, Virginia, United States	3,500
24	Glory 18: Oklahoma	November 7, 2014	Grand Casino Hotel Resort	Shawnee, Oklahoma, United States	1,000
23	Glory 17: Los Angeles	June 21, 2014	The Forum	Inglewood, California, United States	4,000
22	Glory 16: Denver	May 3, 2014	1stBank Center	Broomfield, Colorado, United States	2,350
21	Glory 15: Istanbul	April 12, 2014	Ülker Sports Arena	Istanbul, Turkey	11,000
20	Glory 14: Zagreb	March 8, 2014	Arena Zagreb	Zagreb, Croatia	10,000
19	Glory 13: Tokyo	December 21, 2013	Ariake Coliseum	Tokyo, Japan	8,000
18	Glory 12: New York	November 23, 2013	The Theater at Madison Square Garden	New York City, New York, United States	4,500
17	Glory 11: Chicago	October 12, 2013	Sears Centre	Hoffman Estates, Illinois, United States	1,500
16	Glory 10: Los Angeles	September 28, 2013	Citizens Business Bank Arena	Ontario, California, United States	2,200
15	Glory 9: New York	June 22, 2013	Hammerstein Ballroom	New York City, New York, United States	1,950
14	2013 Road to Glory: USA Heavyweight Tournament	June 14, 2013	Hard Rock Hotel and Casino	Tulsa, Oklahoma, United States	
13	2013 Road to Glory: USA 70 kg Tournament	May 11, 2013	The Rave	Milwaukee, Wisconsin, United States	
12	Glory 8: Tokyo	May 3, 2013	Ariake Coliseum	Tokyo, Japan	3,500
11	Glory 7: Milan	April 20, 2013	Mediolanum Forum	Milan, Italy	10,000
10	Glory 6: Istanbul	April 6, 2013	Ülker Sports Arena	Istanbul, Turkey	12,000
9	Glory 5: London	March 23, 2013	ExCeL Arena	London, England	4,500
8	Road to Glory: USA 77 kg Tournament	March 22, 2013	Capitale	New York City, New York, United States	
7	Road to Glory: Japan 65 kg Tournament	March 10, 2013	Differ Ariake Arena	Tokyo, Japan	
6	Road to Glory: USA 85 kg Tournament	February 9, 2013	Hollywood Park Casino	Los Angeles, California, United States	
5	Road to Glory: USA 95 kg Tournament	February 2, 2013	Hard Rock Hotel and Casino	Tulsa, Oklahoma, United States	
4	Dream 18/Glory 4: Tokyo	December 31, 2012	Saitama Super Arena	Saitama, Japan	15,000
3	Glory 3: Rome	November 3, 2012	PalaLottomatica	Rome, Italy	6,450
2	Glory 2: Brussels	October 6, 2012	Forest National	Brussels, Belgium	5,250
1	Glory 1: Stockholm	May 26, 2012	Ericsson Globe	Stockholm, Sweden	4,500

=== United Glory events ===
#	Event	Date	Venue	Location	Attendance
18	United Glory 15: Glory World Series	March 23, 2012	Dynamo Sports Palace	Moscow, Russia	
17	United Glory 14: 2010-2011 World Series Finals	May 28, 2011	Moscow Forum Hall	Moscow, Russia	
16	United Glory 13: 2010-2011 World Series Semifinals	March 19, 2011	Spiroudome	Charleroi, Belgium	
15	United Glory 12: 2010-2011 World Series Quarterfinals	October 16, 2010	Passenger Terminal	Amsterdam, Netherlands	
14	United Glory: Upcoming Glory 7	March 27, 2010	Sportstudio H&A	Deventer, Netherlands	
13	United Glory 11: A Decade of Fights	October 17, 2009	Passenger Terminal	Amsterdam, Netherlands	
12	United Glory: Upcoming Glory 5	June 27, 2009	Sportstudio H&A	Deventer, Netherlands	
11	United Glory 10: The Battle of Arnhem	November 9, 2008	Rijnhal	Arnhem, Netherlands	
10	United Glory 9: Swiss Las Vegas	August 2, 2008	Markthalle	Basel, Switzerland	
9	United Glory 8	July 6, 2008	Triavium	Nijmegen, Netherlands	
8	United Glory: Upcoming Glory 2	February 24, 2008	Zalencentrum de Kei	Ede, Netherlands	
7	United Glory 7	January 20, 2008	De Flint	Utrecht, Netherlands	
6	United Glory 6: Ede's Best Against the Rest	November 17, 2007	Reehorst Sports Hall	Ede, Netherlands	
5	United Glory 5: Stronger	September 9, 2007	De Flint	Utrecht, Netherlands	
4	United Glory 4: 20 Year Anniversary	September 2, 2007	Hof van Salland	Diepenveen, Netherlands	
3	United Glory 3: Upside Down	May 20, 2007	De Flint	Utrecht, Netherlands	
2	United Glory 2	January 21, 2007	De Flint	Utrecht, Netherlands	
1	United Glory 1	September 17, 2006	Sporthal de Zielhorst	Utrecht, Netherlands	

== Current champions ==
Division	Upper weight limit	Champion	Since	Title defenses
Heavyweight	Unlimited	(Guinea) Mory Kromah	Feb 7, 2026	1
Light Heavyweight	95 kg (209.4 lb)	(Morocco) Mohamed Touchassie	Jun 13, 2026	0
Middleweight	85 kg (187.4 lb)	(Netherlands) Chico Kwasi	Apr 25, 2026	0
Welterweight	77 kg (169.8 lb)	(Netherlands) Chico Kwasi	Apr 27, 2024	5
Lightweight	70 kg (154.3 lb)	Vacant	Sep 1, 2025	–
Featherweight	65 kg (143.3 lb)	(Portugal) Miguel Trindade	Oct 17, 2026	–
Women's Super Bantamweight	55 kg (121.3 lb)	Vacant	Sep 9, 2023	–

Indicates former interim champions.
Indicates current lineal and interim champions.

== Championship history ==
=== Glory Heavyweight Championship ===
Weight limit: Unlimited

No.	Name	Event	Date	Reign (total)	Defenses
1	(Netherlands) Semmy Schilt def. Errol Zimmerman	Glory 1 Stockholm, Sweden	May 26, 2012	386 days	
Schilt vacated the title after retiring due to a heart condition on June 26, 2013.
2	(Netherlands) Rico Verhoeven def. Daniel Ghiță	Glory 17; Inglewood, CA, U.S.	Jun 21, 2014	4220 days	1. def. Errol Zimmerman at Glory 19 on Feb 6, 2015; 2. def. Benjamin Adegbuyi at Glory 22 on Jun 5, 2015; 3. def. Benjamin Adegbuyi at Glory 26 on Dec 4, 2015; 4. def. Mladen Brestovac at Glory 28 on March 12, 2016; 5. def. Anderson Silva at Glory 33 on Sep 9, 2016; 6. def. Jamal Ben Saddik at Glory 49 on Dec 9, 2017; 7. def. Mladen Brestovac at Glory 54 on Jun 2, 2018; 8. def. Guto Inocente at Glory 59 on Sep 29, 2018; 9. def. Badr Hari at Glory 74 on Dec 21, 2019; 10. def. Jamal Ben Saddik at Glory: Collision 3 on Oct 23, 2021; 11. def. interim champion Tariq Osaro at Glory: Collision 6 on Nov 4, 2023; 12. def. Levi Rigters at Glory Collision 7 on Dec 7, 2024; 13. def. Artem Vakhitov at Glory 100 on Jun 14, 2025
–	(Nigeria) Tariq Osaro def. Antonio Plazibat for interim title	Glory: Collision 5 Rotterdam, Netherlands	Jun 17, 2023	–	
Verhoeven vacated the title on November 20, 2025.
3	(Guinea) Mory Kromah walkover vs. Miloš Cvjetićanin	Glory 105; Arnhem, Netherlands	Feb 7, 2026	268 days	1. def. Miloš Cvjetićanin at Glory Collision 9 on Jun 13, 2026

=== Glory Light Heavyweight Championship ===
Weight limit: 95 kg (209.4 lb)

No.	Name	Event	Date	Reign (total)	Defenses
1	(Turkey) Gökhan Saki def. Tyrone Spong	Glory 15; Istanbul, Turkey	Apr 12, 2014	471 days	
Saki was stripped of the title due to inactivity on July 27, 2015.
2	(Brazil) Saulo Cavalari def. Zack Mwekassa	Bellator / Glory: Dynamite 1 San Jose, CA, U.S.	Sep 19, 2015	175 days	
3	(Russia) Artem Vakhitov	Glory 28; Paris, France	Mar 12, 2016	1,785 days	1. def. interim champion Zack Mwekassa at Glory 35 on Nov 5, 2016; 2. def. Saulo Cavalari at Glory 38 on Feb 24, 2017; 3. def. Ariel Machado at Glory 47 on Oct 28, 2017; 4. def. Danyo Ilunga at Glory 56 on Aug 10, 2018; 5. def. Donegi Abena at Glory 66 on Jun 22, 2019
–	(Democratic Republic of the Congo) Zack Mwekassa def. Mourad Bouzidi for interim title	Glory 31; Amsterdam, Netherlands	Jun 25, 2016	–	
–	(Ukraine) Pavel Zhuravlev def. Saulo Cavalari for interim title	Glory 43; New York City, NY, U.S.	Jul 14, 2017	–	1. def. Myron Dennis at Glory 52 on Mar 31, 2018
Zhuravlev was stripped of his interim title when he left Glory for the FEA.
–	(Brazil) Alex Pereira def. Donegi Abena for interim title	Glory 68; Miami, FL, U.S.	Sep 28, 2019	–	
4	(Brazil) Alex Pereira	Glory 77; Rotterdam, Netherlands	Jan 30, 2021	217 days	
5	(Russia) Artem Vakhitov (2)	Glory 78; Rotterdam, Netherlands	Sep 4, 2021	286 days (2,071 days)	
Vakhitov was stripped of the title on June 17, 2022, following the 2022 Russian invasion of Ukraine.
6	(Lithuania) Sergej Maslobojev def. Tarik Khbabez	Glory: Collision 4 Arnhem, Netherlands	Oct 8, 2022	126 days	
7	(Suriname) Donegi Abena	Glory 83; Essen, Germany	Feb 11, 2023	329 days	1. def. Mohamed Touchassie at Glory: Collision 6 on Nov 4, 2023
–	(Morocco) Tarik Khbabez def. Mohamed Amine for interim title	Glory: Collision 5 Rotterdam, Netherlands	Jun 17, 2023	–	
8	(Morocco) Tarik Khbabez	Glory Heavyweight Grand Prix; Arnhem, Netherlands	Mar 9, 2024	462 days	1. def. Donegi Abena at Glory Collision 7 on Dec 7, 2024
9	(Lithuania) Sergej Maslobojev (2)	Glory 100; Rotterdam, Netherlands	Jun 14, 2025	73 days	
Maslobojev vacated the title on August 26, 2025, following a positive test to banned substances.
10	(Morocco) Tarik Khbabez (2) def. Bahram Rajabzadeh	Glory 104; Rotterdam, Netherlands	Oct 11, 2025	121 days	
Khbabez was stripped of the title on February 9, 2026, after refusing a title defense offer.
11	(Morocco) Mohamed Touchassie def. Donovan Wisse	Glory Collision 9 Rotterdam, Netherlands	Jun 13, 2026	142 days (incumbent)	

=== Glory Middleweight Championship ===
Weight limit: 85 kg (187.4 lb)

No.	Name	Event	Date	Reign (total)	Defenses
1	(Russia) Artem Levin def. Joe Schilling	Glory 17; Inglewood, CA, U.S.	Jun 21, 2014	615 days	1. draw with Simon Marcus at Glory 21 on May 8, 2015
2	(Canada) Simon Marcus	Glory 27; Hoffman Estates, IL, U.S.	Feb 26, 2016	196 days	1. def. Dustin Jacoby at Glory 30 on May 13, 2016
3	(Netherlands) Jason Wilnis	Glory 33; Trenton, NJ, U.S.	Sep 9, 2016	232 days	1. def. Israel Adesanya at Glory 37 on Jan 20, 2017
4	(Canada) Simon Marcus (2)	Glory 40; Copenhagen, Denmark	Apr 29, 2017	168 days (364 days)	
5	(Brazil) Alex Pereira	Glory 46; Guangzhou, China	Oct 14, 2017	1,251 days	1. def. Yousri Belgaroui at Glory 49 on Dec 9, 2017; 2. def. Yousri Belgaroui at Glory 55 on Jul 20, 2018; 3. def. Simon Marcus at Glory 58 on Sep 14, 2018; 4. def. Jason Wilnis at Glory 65 on May 17, 2019; 5. def. Ertuğrul Bayrak at Glory 74 on Dec 21, 2019
Pereira vacated the title to compete in the Light Heavyweight division.
6	(Suriname) Donovan Wisse def. Yousri Belgaroui	Glory 78; Rotterdam, Netherlands	Sep 4, 2021	1,694 days	1. def. Juri De Sousa at Glory 81 on Aug 20, 2022; 2. def. Serkan Ozcaglayan at Glory: Collision 5 on Jun 17, 2023; 3. def. Michael Boapeah at Glory: Collision 6 on Nov 4, 2023; 4. def. Ulric Bokeme at Glory 92 on May 18, 2024; 5. def. Sergej Braun at Glory 96 on Oct 12, 2024; 6. def. Michael Boapeah at Glory 100 on Jun 14, 2025
7	(Netherlands) Chico Kwasi	Glory 107; Rotterdam, Netherlands	Apr 25, 2026	191 days (incumbent)	

=== Glory Welterweight Championship ===
Weight limit: 77 kg (169.8 lb)

No.	Name	Event	Date	Reign (total)	Defenses
1	(Belgium) Marc de Bonte def. Karapet Karapetyan	Glory 16; Broomfield, CO, U.S.	May 3, 2014	49 days	
2	(Canada) Joseph Valtellini	Glory 17; Inglewood, CA, U.S.	Jun 21, 2014	348 days	
Valtellini vacated the title suffering from Post-Concussion Syndrome on June 4, 2015.
3	(Netherlands) Nieky Holzken def. Raymond Daniels	Glory 23; Las Vegas, NV, U.S.	Aug 7, 2015	491 days	1. def. Murthel Groenhart at Glory 26 on Dec 4, 2015; 2. def. Yoann Kongolo at Glory 29 on Apr 16, 2016; 3. def. Murthel Groenhart at Glory 34 on Oct 21, 2016
4	(France) Cédric Doumbé	Glory 36; Oberhausen, Germany	Dec 10, 2016	258 days	1. def. Yoann Kongolo at Glory 39 on Mar 25, 2017; 2. def. Nieky Holzken at Glory 42 on Jun 10, 2017
5	(Netherlands) Murthel Groenhart	Glory 44; Hoffman Estates, IL, U.S.	Aug 25, 2017	175 days	
6	(Belgium) Harut Grigorian	Glory 50; Chicago, IL, U.S.	Feb 16, 2018	386 days	1. def. Alim Nabiev at Glory 54 on Jun 2, 2018
7	(France) Cédric Doumbé (2)	Glory 64; Strasbourg, France	Mar 9, 2019	983 days (1,241 days)	1. def. Alim Nabiev at Glory 66 on Jun 22, 2019; 2. def. Karim Ghajji at Glory 76 on Dec 19, 2020; 3. def. interim champion Murthel Groenhart at Glory 77 on Jan 30, 2021
–	(Netherlands) Murthel Groenhart def. Troy Jones for interim title	Glory 70; Lyon, France	Oct 26, 2019	–	
Glory declared the title vacant on November 16, 2021, following Doumbé's retirement from kickboxing.
8	(Curaçao) Endy Semeleer def. Alim Nabiev	Glory 82; Bonn, Germany	Nov 19, 2022	525 days	1. def. Murthel Groenhart at Glory 85 on Apr 29, 2023; 2. def. Jay Overmeer at Glory: Collision 5 on Jun 17, 2023; 3. def. Anwar Ouled-Chaib at Glory 90 on Dec 23, 2023
9	(Netherlands) Chico Kwasi	Glory 91; Paris, France	Apr 27, 2024	919 days (incumbent)	1. drew with Tyjani Beztati at Glory 96 on Oct 12, 2024; 2. def. Teodor Hristov at Glory 98 on Feb 22, 2025; 3. drew with Tyjani Beztati at Glory Underground on May 1, 2025; 4. def. Mehdi Ait El Hadj at Glory 103 on Aug 23, 2025; 5. def. Teodor Hristov at Glory 109 on Sep 5, 2026

=== Glory Lightweight Championship ===
Weight limit: 70 kg (154.3 lb)

No.	Name	Event	Date	Reign (total)	Defenses
1	(Georgia (country)) Davit Kiria def. Andy Ristie	Glory 14; Zagreb, Croatia	Mar 8, 2014	244 days	
2	(Netherlands) Robin van Roosmalen	Glory 18; Oklahoma City, OK, U.S.	Nov 7, 2014	596 days	1. def. Andy Ristie at Glory 20 on Apr 3, 2015; 2. def. Sitthichai Sitsongpeenong at Glory 25 on Nov 6, 2015
3	(Thailand) Sitthichai Sitsongpeenong	Glory 31; Amsterdam, Netherlands	Jun 25, 2016	1056 days	1. def. Marat Grigorian at Glory 36 on Dec 10, 2016; 2. def. Dylan Salvador at Glory 39 on Mar 25, 2017; 3. def. Christian Baya at Glory 50 on Feb 16, 2018; 4. def. Tyjani Beztati at Glory 53 on May 12, 2018; 5. def. Marat Grigorian at Glory 57 on Aug 25, 2018; 6. def. Josh Jauncey at Glory 61 on Nov 2, 2018
4	(Belgium) Marat Grigorian	Glory 65: Utrecht; Utrecht, Netherlands	May 17, 2019	464 days	1. def. Tyjani Beztati at Glory 69 on Oct 12, 2019; 2. def. Elvis Gashi at Glory 73 on Dec 7, 2019
Grigorian vacated the title on August 23, 2020, when he signed for ONE Championship.
5	(Morocco) Tyjani Beztati def. Elvis Gashi	Glory 78; Rotterdam, Netherlands	Sep 4, 2021	1458 days	1. def. Josh Jauncey at Glory 80 Studio on May 14, 2022; 2. def. Stoyan Koprivlenski at Glory: Collision 4 on Oct 8, 2022; 3. def. Petpanomrung Kiatmuu9 at Glory 84 on Mar 11, 2023; 4. def. Kaito Ono at Glory 87 on Aug 19, 2023; 5. def. Enriko Kehl at Glory Heavyweight Grand Prix on Mar 9, 2024
Beztati vacated the title on September 1, 2025, in order to transition to MMA.

=== Glory Featherweight Championship ===
Weight limit: 65 kg (143.3 lb)

No.	Name	Event	Date	Reign Total	Defenses
1	(Canada) Gabriel Varga def. Mosab Amrani	Glory 20; Dubai, UAE	Apr 3, 2015	217 days	
2	(Ukraine) Serhiy Adamchuk	Glory 25; Milan, Italy	Nov 6, 2015	259 days	1. def. Mosab Amrani at Glory 28 on Mar 12, 2016
3	(Canada) Gabriel Varga (2)	Glory 32; Norfolk, VA, U.S.	Jul 22, 2016	91 days (308 days)	
4	(Netherlands) Robin van Roosmalen	Glory 34; Denver, CO, U.S.	Oct 21, 2016	90 days	
van Roosmalen was stripped of the title after failing to make weight for a scheduled title defense on January 19, 2017.
5	(Netherlands) Robin van Roosmalen (2) def. Petchpanomrung Kiatmookao	Glory 41; Den Bosch, Netherlands	May 20, 2017	497 days (587 days)	1. def. Serhiy Adamchuk at Glory 45 on Sep 30, 2017; 2. def. interim champion Kevin VanNostrand at Glory 52 on Mar 31, 2018
–	(United States) Kevin VanNostrand def. Anvar Boynazarov for interim title	Glory 48; New York City, NY, U.S.	Dec 1, 2017	–	
–	(Thailand) Petchpanomrung Kiatmookao def. Kevin VanNostrand for interim title	Glory 55; New York City, NY, U.S.	Jul 20, 2018	–	
6	(Thailand) Petchpanomrung Kiatmookao	Glory 59; Amsterdam, Netherlands	Sep 29, 2018	2867 days	1. def. Serhiy Adamchuk at Glory 63 on Feb 1, 2019; 2. def. Anvar Boynazarov at Glory 67 on Jul 5, 2019; 3. drew with Kevin VanNostrand at Glory 72 on Nov 22, 2019; 4. def. Serhiy Adamchuk at Glory 75 on February 29, 2020; 5. def. Abraham Vidales at Glory: Collision 4 on Oct 8, 2022; 6. def. Ahmad Chikh Mousa at Glory 86 on May 27, 2023; 7. def. David Mejia at Glory 89 on Oct 7, 2023; 8. def. Kento Haraguchi at Glory 93 on Jul 20, 2024; 9. def. Miguel Trindade at Glory 100 on Jun 14, 2025
Petchpanomrung vacated the title on August 5, 2026, in order to return to Muay Thai.
7	(Portugal) Miguel Trindade def. Deniz Demirkapu	Glory 110; Antwerp, Belgium	Oct 17, 2026	16 days	

=== Glory Women's Super Bantamweight Championship ===
Weight limit: 55 kg (121.3 lb)

No.	Name	Event	Date	Reign (total)	Defenses
1	(United States) Tiffany van Soest def. Amel Dehby	Glory 36; Oberhausen, Germany	Dec 10, 2016	356 days	1. def. Meryem Uslu at Glory 44 on Aug 25, 2017
2	(France) Anissa Meksen	Glory 48; New York City, NY, U.S.	Dec 1, 2017	252 days	1. def. Amel Dehby at Glory 53 on May 12, 2018
3	(Brazil) Jady Menezes	Glory 56; Broomfield, CO, U.S.	Aug 10, 2018	84 days	
4	(France) Anissa Meksen (2)	Glory 61; New York City, NY, U.S.	Nov 2, 2018	385 days (637 days)	1. def. Tiffany van Soest at Glory 64 on Mar 9, 2019; 2. def. Sofia Olofsson at Glory 66 on Jun 22, 2019
5	(United States) Tiffany van Soest (2)	Glory 71; Chicago, IL, U.S.	Nov 22, 2019	1,387 days (1,743 days)	1. def. Aline Pereira at Glory 77 on Jan 30, 2021; 2. def. Manazo Kobayashi at Glory 80 on Mar 19, 2022; 3. def. Sarah Moussaddak at Glory: Collision 4 On Oct 8, 2022; 4. def. Sarah Moussaddak at Glory 88 on Sep 9, 2023
Title was vacated when van Soest retired from the sport on September 9, 2023.

== Tournament champions ==
Weight Class	Champion	Runner-up	Event	Date	Tournament Bracket
Glory 70 kg Slam Tournament	(Italy) Giorgio Petrosyan	(Netherlands) Robin van Roosmalen	Glory 3: Rome	November 3, 2012	70kg Slam Tournament bracket
Glory Heavyweight Grand Slam Tournament	(Netherlands) Semmy Schilt	(Romania) Daniel Ghiţă	Dream 18/Glory 4: Tokyo	December 31, 2012	Glory Heavyweight Grand Slam Tournament bracket
Glory 65 kg Slam Tournament	(Japan) Yuta Kubo	(Japan) Masaaki Noiri	Glory 8: Tokyo	May 3, 2013	Glory 65kg Slam Tournament bracket
Glory 95 kg Slam Tournament	(Suriname) Tyrone Spong	(Germany) Danyo Ilunga	Glory 9: New York	June 22, 2013	Glory 95kg Slam Tournament bracket
Glory Middleweight Championship Tournament	(United States) Joe Schilling	(Russia) Artem Levin	Glory 10: Los Angeles	September 28, 2013	Middleweight World Championship Tournament bracket
Glory Heavyweight Championship Tournament	(Netherlands) Rico Verhoeven	(Romania) Daniel Ghiță	Glory 11: Chicago	October 12, 2013	Heavyweight World Championship Tournament bracket
Glory Lightweight Championship Tournament	(Suriname) Andy Ristie	(Netherlands) Robin van Roosmalen	Glory 12: New York	November 23, 2013	Lightweight World Championship Tournament bracket
Glory Welterweight Championship Tournament	(Netherlands) Nieky Holzken	(Canada) Joseph Valtellini	Glory 13: Tokyo	December 21, 2013	Welterweight World Championship Tournament bracket
Glory Light Heavyweight Championship Tournament	(Turkey) Gökhan Saki	(Suriname) Tyrone Spong	Glory 15: Istanbul	April 12, 2014	Light Heavyweight World Championship Tournament bracket
Glory Middleweight Last Man Standing Tournament	(Russia) Artem Levin	(United States) Joe Schilling	Glory 17: Los Angeles	June 21, 2014	Middleweight Last Man Standing Tournament bracket
Glory Women's Super Bantamweight Grand Prix	(United States) Tiffany van Soest	(France) Amel Dehby	Glory 36: Oberhausen	December 10, 2016	
Glory Heavyweight Grand Prix	(Netherlands) Jamal Ben Saddik	(Romania) Benjamin Adegbuyi	Glory 62: Rotterdam	December 8, 2018	Glory Heavyweight Tournament bracket
Glory 4-man Heavyweight Tournament	(Netherlands) Levi Rigters	(France) Nordine Mahieddine	Glory 76: Rotterdam	December 19, 2020	Glory Heavyweight Tournament bracket
Glory 4-man Heavyweight Tournament	(Netherlands) Rico Verhoeven	(Morocco) Tarik Khbabez	Glory 77: Rotterdam	January 30, 2021	Glory Heavyweight Tournament bracket
Glory 4-man Heavyweight Tournament	(Netherlands) Tariq Osaro	(Netherlands) Murat Aygün	Glory 85	April 29, 2023	
Glory 4-man Heavyweight Tournament	(Azerbaijan) Bahram Rajabzadeh	(Estonia) Uku Jürjendal	Glory 87	August 19, 2023	
Glory Heavyweight Grand Prix	(Netherlands) Rico Verhoeven	(Netherlands) Levi Rigters	Glory Heavyweight Grand Prix	March 9, 2024	Glory Heavyweight Grand Prix bracket
Glory Light Heavyweight Grand Prix	(Suriname) Donegi Abena	(Azerbaijan) Bahram Rajabzadeh	Glory Light Heavyweight Grand Prix	June 8, 2024	Glory Light Heavyweight Grand Prix bracket
Glory RISE Featherweight Grand Prix	(Thailand) Petpanomrung Kiatmuukao	(Portugal) Miguel Trindade	Glory RISE Featherweight Grand Prix	December 21, 2024	GLORY RISE Featherweight Grand Prix bracket
Glory 4-man Light Heavyweight Tournament	(Netherlands) Michael Boapeah	(Serbia) Miloš Cvjetićanin	Glory Collision 8	December 13, 2025	Glory Light Heavyweight Tournament bracket
Glory 4-man Welterweight Tournament	(Curaçao) Endy Semeleer	(Bulgaria) Teodor Hristov	Glory Collision 8	December 13, 2025	Glory Welterweight Tournament bracket
Glory Last Heavyweight Standing Tournament	(Netherlands) Mory Kromah	(Serbia) Miloš Cvjetićanin	Glory 105: Glory Last Heavyweight Standing Final	February 7, 2026	Glory Last Heavyweight Standing Finals Tournament bracket
Glory RISE Last Featherweight Standing Tournament	(Japan) Kento Haraguchi	(Thailand) Petpanomrung Kiatmuukao	Glory 108	June 6, 2026	GLORY x RISE Last Featherweight Standing bracket
Glory Light Heavyweight Grand Prix	(Netherlands) Mohamed Touchassie	(Suriname) Donovan Wisse	Glory Collision 9	June 13, 2026	Glory Light Heavyweight Grand Prix bracket

=== Contender Tournament champions ===
Weight Class	Champion	Runner-up	Event	Date	Tournament Bracket
2014 Glory Middleweight Contender Tournament	(Brazil) Alex Pereira	(Armenia) Sahak Parparyan	Glory 14: Zagreb	March 8, 2014	2014 Glory Middleweight Contender Tournament bracket
2014 Glory Heavyweight Contender Tournament	(Netherlands) Errol Zimmerman	(Brazil) Anderson Braddock	Glory 16: Denver	May 3, 2014	2014 Glory Heavyweight Contender Tournament bracket
2014 Glory Featherweight Contender Tournament	(Canada) Gabriel Varga	(United States) Shane Oblonsky	Glory 17: Los Angeles	June 21, 2014	2014 Glory Featherweight Contender Tournament bracket
2014 Glory Light Heavyweight Contender Tournament	(Brazil) Saulo Cavalari	(Democratic Republic of the Congo) Zack Mwekassa	Glory 18: Oklahoma	November 7, 2014	2014 Glory Light Heavyweight Contender Tournament bracket
2015 Glory Welterweight Contender Tournament	(Netherlands) Nieky Holzken	(United States) Raymond Daniels	Glory 19: Virginia	February 6, 2015	2015 Glory Welterweight Contender Tournament bracket
2015 Glory Middleweight Contender Tournament	(Canada) Simon Marcus	(Netherlands) Jason Wilnis	Glory 20: Dubai	April 3, 2015	2015 Glory Middleweight Contender Tournament bracket
2015 Glory Lightweight Contender Tournament	(Thailand) Sitthichai Sitsongpeenong	(Canada) Josh Jauncey	Glory 22: Lille	June 5, 2015	2015 Glory Lightweight Contender Tournament bracket
2015 Glory Heavyweight Contender Tournament	(Romania) Benjamin Adegbuyi	(Netherlands) Jahfarr Wilnis	Glory 24: Denver	October 9, 2015	2015 Glory Heavyweight Contender Tournament bracket
2015 Glory Welterweight Contender Tournament	(Netherlands) Murthel Groenhart	(France) Karim Ghajji	Glory 25: Milan	November 6, 2015	2015 Glory Welterweight Contender Tournament bracket
2015 Glory Featherweight Contender Tournament	(Morocco) Mosab Amrani	(Brazil) Maykol Yurk	Glory 26: Amsterdam	December 4, 2015	2015 Glory Featherweight Contender Tournament bracket
2016 Glory Middleweight Contender Tournament	(United States) Dustin Jacoby	(United States) Wayne Barrett	Glory 27: Chicago	February 26, 2016	2016 Glory Middleweight Contender Tournament bracket
2016 Glory Lightweight Contender Tournament	(Thailand) Sitthichai Sitsongpeenong	(Belgium) Marat Grigorian	Glory 28: Paris	March 12, 2016	2016 Glory Lightweight Contender Tournament bracket
2016 Glory Heavyweight Contender Tournament	(Netherlands) Ismael Londt	(Netherlands) Jahfarr Wilnis	Glory 29: Copenhagen	April 16, 2016	2016 Glory Heavyweight Contender Tournament bracket
2016 Glory Welterweight Contender Tournament	(Netherlands) Murthel Groenhart	(Switzerland) Yoann Kongolo	Glory 31: Amsterdam	June 25, 2016	2016 Glory Welterweight Contender Tournament bracket
2016 Glory Light Heavyweight Contender Tournament	(France) Zinedine Hameur-Lain	(Brazil) Ariel Machado	Glory 32: Virginia	July 22, 2016	2016 Glory Light Heavyweight Contender Tournament bracket
2016 Glory Featherweight Contender Tournament	(Canada) Matt Embree	(Georgia (country)) Giga Chikadze	Glory 33: New Jersey	September 9, 2016	2016 Glory Featherweight Contender Tournament bracket
2016 Glory Middleweight Contender Tournament	(Nigeria) Israel Adesanya	(Netherlands) Yousri Belgaroui	Glory 34: Denver	October 21, 2016	2016 Glory Middleweight Contender Tournament bracket
2016 Glory Heavyweight Contender Tournament	(Romania) Benjamin Adegbuyi	(Croatia) Mladen Brestovac	Glory 35: Nice	November 5, 2016	2016 Glory Heavyweight Contender Tournament bracket
2016 Glory Lightweight Contender Tournament	(France) Dylan Salvador	(Albania) Hysni Beqiri	Glory 36: Oberhausen	December 10, 2016	2016 Glory Lightweight Contender Tournament bracket
2017 Glory Welterweight Contender Tournament	(Switzerland) Yoann Kongolo	(France) Karim Benmansour	Glory 37: Los Angeles	January 20, 2017	2017 Glory Welterweight Contender Tournament bracket
2017 Glory Light Heavyweight Contender Tournament	(Brazil) Ariel Machado	(France) Zinedine Hameur-Lain	Glory 38: Chicago	February 24, 2017	2017 Glory Light Heavyweight Contender Tournament bracket
2017 Glory Featherweight Contender Tournament	(Thailand) Petchpanomrung Kiatmookao	(Ukraine) Serhiy Adamchuk	Glory 39: Brussels	March 25, 2017	2017 Glory Featherweight Contender Tournament bracket
2017 Glory Middleweight Contender Tournament	(Netherlands) Yousri Belgaroui	(Brazil) Alex Pereira	Glory 40: Copenhagen	April 29, 2017	2017 Glory Middleweight Contender Tournament bracket
2017 Glory Heavyweight Contender Tournament	(Netherlands) D'Angelo Marshall	(Brazil) Anderson Braddock	Glory 41: Holland	May 20, 2017	2017 Glory Heavyweight Contender Tournament bracket
2017 Glory Lightweight Contender Tournament	(Netherlands) Christian Baya	(Netherlands) Massaro Glunder	Glory 42: Paris	June 10, 2017	2017 Glory Lightweight Contender Tournament bracket
2017 Glory Featherweight Contender Tournament	(United States) Kevin VanNostrand	(Georgia (country)) Giga Chikadze	Glory 43: New York	July 14, 2017	2017 Glory Featherweight Contender Tournament bracket
2017 Glory Welterweight Contender Tournament	(Belgium) Harut Grigorian	(France) Antoine Pinto	Glory 44: Chicago	August 25, 2017	2017 Glory Welterweight Contender Tournament bracket
2017 Glory Light Heavyweight Contender Tournament	(Netherlands) Michael Duut	(United States) Manny Mancha	Glory 45: Amsterdam	September 30, 2017	2017 Glory Light Heavyweight Contender Tournament bracket
2017 Glory Featherweight Contender Tournament	(France) Abdellah Ezbiri	(Uzbekistan) Anvar Boynazarov	Glory 47: Lyon	October 28, 2017	2017 Featherweight Contender Tournament bracket
2017 Glory Lightweight Contender Tournament	(Bulgaria) Stoyan Koprivlenski	(Netherlands) Tyjani Beztati	Glory 49: Rotterdam	December 9, 2017	2017 Glory Lightweight Contender Tournament bracket
2018 Glory Heavyweight Contender Tournament	(Romania) Benjamin Adegbuyi	(Australia) Junior Tafa	Glory 50: Chicago	February 16, 2018	2018 Glory Heavyweight Contender Tournament bracket
2018 Glory Welterweight Contender Tournament	(Netherlands) Eyevan Danenberg	(Thailand) Thongchai Sitsongpeenong	Glory 51: Rotterdam	March 3, 2018	2018 Glory Welterweight Contender Tournament bracket
2018 Glory Featherweight Contender Tournament	(Ukraine) Serhiy Adamchuk	(France) Victor Pinto	Glory 53: Lille	May 12, 2018	2018 Glory Featherweight Contender Tournament bracket

=== Qualification Tournament winners ===
Weight Class	Champion	Runner-up	Event	Date	Tournament Bracket
2015 Glory Heavyweight Qualification Tournament	(United States) Xavier Vigney	(England) Chi Lewis Parry	Glory 21: San Diego	May 8, 2015	2015 Glory Heavyweight Qualification Tournament bracket
2015 Glory Middleweight Qualification Tournament	(United States) Dustin Jacoby	(United States) Casey Greene	Glory 23: Las Vegas	August 7, 2015	2015 Glory Middleweight Qualification Tournament bracket
2016 Glory Welterweight Qualification Tournament	(United States) Richard Abraham	(United States) Francois Ambang	Glory 30: Los Angeles	May 13, 2016	2016 Glory Welterweight Qualification Tournament bracket
2017 Glory Featherweight Qualification Tournament	(China) Chenglong Zhang	(Japan) Masaya Kubo	Glory 46: China	October 14, 2017	2017 Glory Featherweight Qualification Tournament bracket
2017 Glory Middleweight Qualification Tournament	(Canada) Robert Thomas	(United States) Mike Lemaire	Glory 48: New York	December 1, 2017	2017 Middleweight Qualification Tournament bracket
2018 Glory Lightweight Qualification Tournament	(China) Liu Xu	(China) Wensheng Zhang	Glory 57: Shenzhen	August 25, 2018	2018 Glory Lightweight Qualification Tournament bracket

=== Road to Glory Tournament champions ===
Weight Class	Champion	Runner-up	Event	Date	Tournament Bracket
Road to Glory USA 95 kg Tournament	(United States) Dustin Jacoby	(United States) Brian Collette	Road to Glory USA 95 kg Tournament	February 2, 2013	
Road to Glory USA 85 kg Tournament	(United States) Mike Lemaire	(United States) Eddie Walker	Road to Glory USA 85 kg Tournament	February 9, 2013	
Road to Glory Japan 65 kg Tournament	(Japan) Masaaki Noiri	(Japan) Yuki	Road to Glory Japan 65 kg Tournament	March 10, 2013	
Road to Glory USA 77 kg Tournament	(United States) Francois Ambang	(United States) Brett Hlavacek	Road to Glory USA 77 kg Tournament	March 22, 2013	
Road to Glory Japan 85 kg Tournament	(Japan) Kengo Shimizu	(Japan) Magnum Sakai	Road to Glory Japan 85 kg Tournament	May 3, 2013	
Road to Glory USA 70 kg Tournament	(United States) Michael Mananquil	(United States) Troy Sheridan	2013 Road to Glory USA 70 kg Tournament	May 11, 2013	
Road to Glory USA Heavyweight Tournament	(United States) Xavier Vigney	(United States) Maurice Green	Road to Glory USA Heavyweight Tournament	June 14, 2013	
Road to Glory UK 65 kg Tournament	(England) Mo Abdurahman	(England) Bailey Sugden	Road to Glory UK 65 kg Tournament	March 11, 2017	

== Multi-division champions ==
Fighters who have won championships in multiple weight classes (excluding tournament champions).

- (Netherlands) Robin van Roosmalen - Won Glory Lightweight Championship on November 7, 2014, then Glory Featherweight Championship on October 21, 2016.
- (Brazil) Alex Pereira - Won Glory Middleweight Championship on October 14, 2017, then Glory Light Heavyweight Championship on January 30, 2021.
- (Suriname) Chico Kwasi - Won Glory Welterweight Championship on April 27, 2024, then Glory Middleweight Championship on April 25, 2026.

== Hall of Fame ==
Image	ISO	Name	Date of Induction	Ref.	Event of Induction	ONE recognized accolades
	(Canada)	Joseph Valtellini	2021			2013 Glory Welterweight World Championship tournament runner-up. Glory Welterweight Champion.
	(Netherlands)	Semmy Schilt	2022			Glory Heavyweight Championship (One time; First); Glory 2012 Heavyweight Grand Slam Tournament Champion
	(Brazil)	Alex Pereira	2023			2021 Glory Light Heavyweight Champion; 2019 Glory interim Light Heavyweight Champion; 2017 Glory Middleweight Champion (five defenses); 2014 Glory Middleweight Contender Tournament Winner
	(Suriname)	Remy Bonjasky	2026		Glory 105	2003 K-1 World Grand Prix in Las Vegas II Champion 2003 K-1 World Grand Prix Champion 2004 K-1 World Grand Prix Champion 2008 K-1 World Grand Prix Champion; 6 fights in GLORY; Helped promotion Kickboxing as a analyst, in his podcast and with his academy

== Records ==
Record	Fighter	Number
Youngest Champion	Tyjani Beztati	23 years, 10 months and 14 days
Oldest Champion	Sergej Maslobojev	38 years, 3 months and 4 days
Longest reign as a Champion	Rico Verhoeven	4220 days
Most championship reigns	8 fighters	2
Most Bouts	Rico Verhoeven	29
Most Wins	Rico Verhoeven	28
Most Knockouts	Rico Verhoeven	10
Most Decision Wins	Petpanomrung Kiatmuu9	21
Most wins in title bouts	Rico Verhoeven	14
Most title bouts	Rico Verhoeven	14
Most consecutive title defenses	Rico Verhoeven	13
Longest winning streak	Rico Verhoeven	27
Fastest knockout	Jon King	0:10
Fastest Title Fight Knockout	Alex Pereira	1:54

== Awards ==
- World Independent Promoters Union (WIPU)
  - 2011 Runner up - Kickboxing Promotion of the Year
- Beyond Kickboxing
  - Beyond Kickboxing's 2024 Promotion of the Year

== See also ==
- Golden Glory
- List of current kickboxing world champions
