= Shkodran =

- Gender: male

Origin
- Origin: Albanian
- Meaning: inhabitant of Shkodër
- Region of origin: Albania

Other names
- Variant form: feminine: Shkodrane

Shkodran is a masculine Albanian given name. Notable people with the name include:

- Shkodran Metaj (born 1988), Dutch footballer of Kosovar Albanian descent
- Shkodran Mustafi (born 1992), German footballer of Macedonian Albanian descent
- Shkodran Maholli (born 1993), Swedish footballer of Kosovar Albanian descent
- Shkodran Veseli (born 1990), Kosovar footballer
