= Final Fight Championship =

Mixed martial arts promoter based in Las Vegas

- Type: Private
- Industry: Combat sports promotion
- Founded: 2003
- Founder: Orsat Zovko
- Headquarters: Zagreb, Croatia; Las Vegas, Nevada, United States
- Key people: Orsat Zovko , Chairman/President
- Website: www.finalfightchampionship.com

Final Fight Championship (FFC) is an international combat sports promotion company founded in 2003 by the FFC owner and CEO Orsat Zovko. The company has its headquarters in Las Vegas, Nevada, USA, as well as a European office in Zagreb, Croatia.

FFC started as a kickboxing promotion, in 2013 FFC introduced MMA fights in its events as well as boxing matches in 2016.

== Events ==
#	Event Title	Date	Arena	Location	Attendance
44	Final Fight Championship 40: Egli vs. Lemminger	5 September 2019	Fight Dome, Las Vegas	Las Vegas, USA	
43	Final Fight Championship 39: Jones vs. Powell	11 July 2019	Fight Dome, Las Vegas	Las Vegas, USA	
42	Final Fight Championship 38: Cucciniello vs. Emmers	20 June 2019	Fight Dome, Las Vegas	Las Vegas, USA	
41	Final Fight Championship 37: Santiago vs. Martinez	30 May 2019	Fight Dome, Las Vegas	Las Vegas, USA	
40	Final Fight Championship 36: Chub vs. Ambang	10 May 2019	Fight Dome, Las Vegas	Las Vegas, USA	
39	Final Fight Championship 35: Egli vs. Holt	19 April 2019	Fight Dome, Las Vegas	Las Vegas, USA	
38	Final Fight Championship 34: Petje vs. Gazani	17 November 2018	Fight Dome, Las Vegas	Las Vegas, USA	
37	Final Fight Championship 33: Chub vs. Vrtacic	3 November 2018	Fight Dome, Las Vegas	Las Vegas, USA	
36	Final Fight Championship 32: Graves vs. Seumanutafa	19 October 2018	Fight Dome, Las Vegas	Las Vegas, USA	
35	Final Fight Championship 31: Neves vs. Egli	12 October 2018	Fight Dome, Las Vegas	Las Vegas, USA	
34	Final Fight Championship 30: Ishii vs. Schmiedeberg	21 October 2017	TipsArena, Linz	Linz, Austria	
33	Final Fight Championship 29: Champion vs. Champion	22 April 2017	Tivoli Hall	Ljubljana, Slovenia	
32	Final Fight Championship 28: Greece vs. Rest of the World	11 March 2017	Faliro Sports Pavilion Arena	Athens, Greece	
31	Final Fight Championship 27: Night of Champions	17 December 2016	Arena Zagreb	Zagreb, Croatia	
30	Final Fight Championship 26: Linz	23 September 2016	TipsArena Linz	Linz, Austria	
39	Final Fight Championship 25: Springfield	10 June 2016	MassMutual Center	Springfield, Massachusetts, United States	
28	Final Fight Championship 24: Daytona Beach	3 June 2016	Ocean Center	Daytona Beach, USA	
27	Final Fight Championship 23: Austria	18 March 2016	Multiversum Schwechat	Vienna, Austria	
26	Final Fight Championship 22: Athens	19 February 2016	Faliro Sports Pavilion Arena	Athens, Greece	
25	Final Fight Championship 21: Rijeka	27 November 2015	Cantar Zamet	Rijeka, Croatia	
24	Final Fight Championship 20: Zagreb	23 October 2015	Dražen Petrović Basketball Hall	Zagreb, Croatia	3,000
23	Final Fight Championship 19: Sakara vs. Akil	18 September 2015	TipsArena Linz	Linz, Austria	
22	Final Fight Championship 18: Pokrajac vs. Taxiarchis	17 April 2015	Arena Stožice	Ljubljana, Slovenia	
21	Final Fight Championship 17: Futures Super Finals	20 December 2014	Marino Cvetković Sports Hall	Opatija, Croatia	
20	Final Fight Championship 16: Sakara vs. Browarski	6 December 2014	Multiversum Schwechat	Vienna, Austria	
19	Final Fight Championship 15: Jurković vs. Stolzenbach	21 November 2014	Žatika Sport Centre	Poreč, Croatia	3,500
18	FFC Futures 4	21 November 2014	Žatika Sport Centre	Poreč, Croatia	
17	Final Fight Championship 14: Račić vs. Krušič	3 October 2014	Tivoli Hall	Ljubljana, Slovenia	1,000
16	FFC Futures 3	27 September 2014	Sutinska Vrela Sports Hall	Zagreb, Croatia	1,000
15	Final Fight Championship 13: Jurković vs. Tavares	6 June 2014	Krešimir Ćosić Hall	Zadar, Croatia	1,500
14	FFC Futures 2	3 May 2014	Marino Cvetković Sports Hall	Opatija, Croatia	1,500
13	Final Fight Championship 12: Daley vs. Fabjan	25 April 2014	Tivoli Hall	Ljubljana, Slovenia	6,000
12	Final Fight Championship 11: Jurković vs. Kaluđerović	4 April 2014	Gradski vrt Hall	Osijek, Croatia	4,300
11	FFC Futures 1	1 March 2014	Marino Cvetković Sports Hall	Opatija, Croatia	2,000
10	Final Fight Championship 10: Rodriguez vs. Batzelas	13 December 2013	Boris Trajkovski Sports Center	Skopje, Macedonia	6,000
9	Final Fight Championship 9: McSweeney vs. Traunmuller	15 November 2013	Tivoli Hall	Ljubljana, Slovenia	2,500
8	Final Fight Championship 8: Zelg vs. Rodriguez	25 October 2013	Arena Zagreb	Zagreb, Croatia	7,500
7	Final Fight Championship 7: Poturak vs. Munoz	13 March 2015	Skenderija	Sarajevo, Bosnia and Herzegovina	Canceled event.
6	Final Fight Championship 6: Jurković vs. Poturak	14 June 2013	Žatika Sport Centre	Poreč, Croatia	4,300
5	Final Fight Championship 5: Rodriguez vs. Simonič	24 May 2013	Gradski vrt Hall	Osijek, Croatia	4,000
4	Final Fight Championship 4: Perak vs. Joni	10 May 2013	Krešimir Ćosić Hall	Zadar, Croatia	4,700
3	Final Fight Championship 3: Jurković vs. Cătinaș	19 April 2013	Arena Gripe	Split, Croatia	1,000
2	Cro Cop Final Fight	10 March 2012	Arena Zagreb	Zagreb, Croatia	10,500
1	Final Fight: Stars war	31 October 2003	Dom Sportova	Zagreb, Croatia	10,000

== History ==
=== The Final Fight: Stars War ===
The Final Fight: Stars War
- Promotion: Final Fight Championship
- Date: 31 October 2003
- Venue: Dom Sportova
- City: Zagreb, Croatia

The Final Fight: Stars War, also known as K-1 Final Fight Stars War in Zagreb, was a kickboxing event produced by Final Fight Championship that was held on 31 October 2003 at Dom Sportova in Zagreb, Croatia. It was the inaugural event held under the FFC banner.

The event was headlined by a heavyweight bout between Mike Bernardo and Sergey Gur. Additionally, the card also featured Stefan Leko, Alexey Ignashov, and Vitali Akhramenko.

Results

Main card
Weight class				Method	Round	Time	Notes
KB +95kg	Mike Bernardo	def.	Sergey Gur	TKO (referee stoppage)	2	N/A
KB +95kg	Stefan Leko	def.	Sebastiaan van de Muysenberg	KO (punches)	2	N/A
KB -95kg	Alexey Ignashov	def.	Josip Bodrozic	Decision (split)	5	3:00
KB −70kg	Ante Bilic	def.	Jose Reis	Decision (split)	5	3:00
KB +95	Vitali Akhramenko	def.	Dewey Cooper	Decision (unanimous)	5	3:00
KB +95kg	Ivica Perkovic	def.	Marc De Wit	Decision (unanimous)	3	3:00
KB −81kg	Mirko Cappellato	def.	Phillip Trapani	TKO (shoulder injury)	N/A	N/A

=== Cro Cop Final Fight ===
Cro Cop Final Fight
- Promotion: Final Fight Championship
- Date: 10 March 2012
- Venue: Arena Zagreb
- City: Zagreb, Croatia

Cro Cop Final Fight was a kickboxing event produced by the Final Fight Championship that was held on 10 March 2012 at Arena Zagreb in Zagreb, Croatia.

Final Fight had a nine-year break before organizing its second event titled Cro Cop Final Fight.

The event was headlined by a heavyweight bout between Mirko Cro Cop and eight-time K-1 WGP finalist Ray Sefo. The bout also marked Mirko Cro Cop's return to kickboxing after nine years spent in mixed martial arts. Moreover, it was also first Cro Cop's major fight in front of his hometown audience.

In addition to Mirko Cro Cop and Sefo, the event, attended by a crowd of approximately 11,000 people, included the likes of former It's Showtime champion Daniel Ghiță, SUPERKOMBAT WGP winner Sergei Lascenko and former It's Showtime champion Sahak Parparyan. Up and coming local fighters also got a chance to make a name for themselves, such as Mladen Brestovac, Toni Milanović and Agron Preteni.

Results

Main card
Weight class				Method	Round	Time	Notes
KB +95kg	Mirko Cro Cop	def.	Ray Sefo	Decision (unanimous)	3	3:00
KB +95kg	Daniel Ghiță	def.	Sergei Lascenko	TKO (head kick)	3	0:49
KB -95kg	Igor Jurković	def.	Freddy Kemayo	Decision (majority)	Ex.r	3:00
KB +95kg	Mladen Brestovac	def.	Mourad Bouzidi	TKO (injury)	1	0:30
KB +95kg	Mladen Kujundžić	def.	Marin Došen	Decision (unanimous)	Ex.r	3:00
KB −95kg	Agron Preteni	def.	Pacome Assi	Decision (majority)	3	3:00
KB +95kg	Michael Duut	def.	Stefan Jelić	Decision (unanimous)	3	3:00
KB −86kg	Sahak Parparyan	def.	Toni Milanović	Decision (unanonimous)	3	3:00
KB −81kg	Miran Fabjan	def.	Ivan Posavec	Decision (unanimous)	3	3:00

=== FFC era ===
In March 2013, Fight Channel announced a series of events under the Final Fight brand, with the addition of the word "Championship" (C) in the promotion's name, revealing its intention to organize title bouts in the future. Also revealed was its new updated logo. FFC President Orsat Zovko announced that the promotion would hold at least 10 events in 2013, which would feature kickboxing and MMA bouts in equal measure. Each event was to have ten fights, four on the preliminary fight card and six on the main card. This was a novelty considering that the first two Final Fight events featured only kickboxing matches. The events were to be broadcast live on Fight Channel in Croatia, but also on many other international cable platforms. Zovko relied on the success of K-1 WGP Final event in Zagreb, Croatia, also produced and co-organized by Fight Channel in 2003 and ultimately won by Mirko Cro Cop. It was first K-1 WGP Final ever held outside Japan.

==== FFC 3: Jurković vs. Cătinaș ====
FFC 3: Jurković vs. Cătinaș
- Promotion: Final Fight Championship
- Date: 19 April 2013
- Venue: Gripe
- City: Split, Croatia

FFC 3: Jurković vs. Cătinaș was a mixed martial arts and kickboxing event produced by the Final Fight Championship that was held on 19 April 2013 at Gripe in Split, Croatia

The event was headlined by a heavyweight kickboxing bout between Igor Jurković and Raul Cătinaș.

Local fighter Agron Preteni who defeated favourite Romanian Andrei Stoica at the K-1 WGP Final several weeks earlier was also to fight at the event but he was forced to withdraw citing an injury. The promotion was unable to find a last-minute replacement for Preteni, which is why FFC 3 featured nine instead of the scheduled 10 fights.

In the first preliminary MMA bout of the evening, Ivan Gluhak defeated Dejan Milošević via stoppage at the end of the second round. Gluhak vs. Milošević was the first MMA bout in Final Fight Championship's history.

In the main event, Igor Jurković defeated Romanian Cătinaș via decision, while in the co-main event K-1 WGP Final semifinalist Pavel Zhuravlev KO'ed Italy's Luca Panto.

FFC 3 was broadcast live in more than fifty countries, including national TV stations in Croatia and Bosnia and Herzegovina. Croatian national TV network Nova TV later reported that FFC 3 had a 32% share in TV ratings, making the event the most watched show of that week.

After the event, Orsat Zovko announced the upcoming events in Zadar, Osijek and Poreč, as well as FFC's expansion and events in other countries of the Southeastern Europe.

Results

Main card
Weight class				Method	Round	Time	Notes
KB +95kg	Igor Jurković	def.	Raul Cătinaș	Decision (unanimous)	3	3:00
KB +95kg	Pavel Zhuravlev	def.	Luca Panto	TKO	1	1:28
MMA +93kg	Ante Delija	def.	Michail Lamprakis	TKO	1	1:27
MMA −93kg	Tomislav Spahović	def.	Christian Golčić	KO	1	0:40
KB −81kg	Zlatko Bajić	def.	Petros Vardakas	Decision (unanimous)	3	3:00
KB +95kg	Mladen Kujundžić	def.	Rok Štrucl	Decision (unanimous)	3	3:00
Preliminary card
MMA −93kg	Matej Batinić	def.	Teo Radnić	Submission (RNC)	1	1:47
KB −88kg	Toni Milanović	def.	Ibrahim El Bouni	Decision (unanimous)	3	3:0
MMA, −77kg	Ivan Gluhak	def.	Dejan Milošević	Submission (retirement)	3	0:00

==== FFC 4: Perak vs. Joni ====
FFC 4: Perak vs. Joni
- Promotion: Final Fight Championship
- Date: 10 May 2013
- Venue: Višnjik Hall
- City: Zadar, Croatia

FFC 4: Perak vs. Joni was a mixed martial arts and kickboxing event produced by the Final Fight Championship that was held on 10 May 2013 at Višnjik in Zadar, Croatia.

The event was headlined by a heavyweight MMA bout between Maro Perak and Tibor Joni.

Only three weeks after its first event under the new name, Final Fight Championship held its first event in Zadar, Croatia. The event took place in Višnjik arena with the capacity of 9,500 seats. According to the media estimates, FFC 4 was attended by a 4,500-strong crowd, a significantly better result compared to the previous FFC 3 in Split. FFC 4 was the first event in the promotion's history with an MMA bout in the main event.

After numerous cancellations and injuries, Maro Perak. Perak called out Denis Stojnić, a former UFC fighter, but Stojnić refused the offer. Stojnić told the media that his goal was to make it back to the UFC and for that he needed a win over a big name like Mirko Cro Cop, Mustapha Al Turk, Andrei Arlovski or Jeff Monsont.

In the co-main event, Croatian kickboxing heavyweight Mladen Brestovac defeated Sergei Lascenko via decision after three rounds. Both fighters had previously participated in the K-1 WGP Final in Zagreb where Brestovac defeated Spain's Frank Munoz, while Lascenko lost to Dževad Poturak.

Poland's Maciej Browarski, who stepped in on short notice, pulled off a huge upset when he defeated one of the best European MMA lightheavyweight fighters, Jason Jones, in the first round.

Results

Main card
Weight class				Method	Round	Time	Notes
MMA +95kg	Maro Perak	def.	Tibor Joni	TKO	1	1:28
KB +95kg	Mladen Brestovac	def.	Sergei Lascenko	Decision (unanimous)	3	3:00
MMA +95kg	Maciej Browarski	def.	Jason Jones	KO	2	4:30
MMA −70kg	Ivica Trušček	def.	Vaso Bakočević	TKO	2	1:28
KB −85kg	Jason Wilnis	def.	Zoran Majkić	KO	1	2:59
KB −81kg	Emil Zoraj	def.	Zlatko Bajić	Decision (unanimous)	3	3:00
Preliminary card
MMA −70kg	Antun Račić	def.	Bojan Kosednar	Decision (unanimous)	3	5:00
MMA −84kg	Antonio Mijatović	def.	Marko Lukačić	Decision (unanimous)	3	5:00	(Note: Overturned by Croatian MMA Association to a draw)
MMA Catchweight (−81kg)	Luka Jelčić	def.	David Vasić	Submission (RNC)	1	1:18
KB +95kg	Igor Mihaljević	def.	Ante Verunica	Decision (unanimous)	3	3:00

==== FFC 5: Rodriguez vs. Simonjič ====
FFC 5: Rodriguez vs. Simonjič
- Promotion: Final Fight Championship
- Date: 24 May 2013
- Venue: Gradski vrt Hall
- City: Osijek, Croatia

FFC 5: Rodriguez vs. Simonjič was a mixed martial arts and kickboxing event produced by the Final Fight Championship that was held on 24 May 2013 at Gradski vrt in Osijek, Croatia.

The event was headlined by a heavyweight MMA bout between former UFC champion Ricco Rodriguez and Slovenia's Tomaž Simonjič.

In the co-main event, Ukraine's kickboxer Pavel Zhuravlev KO'ed the Netherlands's Vinchenzo Renfurm, making his second consecutive win in the FFC. Croatia's MMA Ante Delija and Ante Račić also achieved wins, while Bosnian Igor Emkić defeated Ivan Stanić fighting out of Croatia.

Only two bouts went the distance.

At the post-fight presser, Ricco Rodriguez called out former UFC fighter Denis Stojnić. Stojnić later refused that proposition claiming that UFC matchmaker Joe Silva wanted him to fight Mirko Cro Cop, Mustapha Al Turk, Andrei Arlovski or Jeff Monson.

Results

Main card
Weight class				Method	Round	Time	Notes
MMA +93kg	Ricco Rodriguez	def.	Tomaž Simonjič	Submission (armbar)	1	3:49
KB +95kg	Pavel Zhuravlev	def.	Vinchenzo Renfurm	KO	2	2:44
MMA +95kg	Ante Delija	def.	Gzim Selmani	TKO	1	3:09
MMA −66kg	Antun Račić	def.	Artak Nazaryan	Decision (unanimous)	3	5:00
KB +95kg	Igor Mihaljević	def.	Uroš Veličević	Decision (unanimous)	3	3:00
MMA −77kg	Laszlo Senyei	def.	Ivan Gluhak	Submission (armbar)	3	2:40
Preliminary card
KB −86kg	Igor Emkić	def.	Ivan Stanić	KO	3	1:25
KB +95kg	Stefan Anđelković	vs.	Nino Vladušić	No Contest (injury)	1	0:00
MMA −93kg	Matej Batinić	def.	Attila Petrovszki	Submission (RNC)	1	3:25
MMA +95kg	Saša Milinković	def.	Michail Lamprakis	Submission (armbar)	1	3:18

==== FFC 6: Jurković vs. Poturak ====
FFC 6: Jurković vs. Poturak
- Promotion: Final Fight Championship
- Date: 14 June 2013
- Venue: Žatika Sport Centre
- City: Poreč, Croatia

FFC 6: Jurković vs. Poturak was a mixed martial arts and kickboxing event produced by the Final Fight Championship that was held on 14 June 2013 at Žatika Sport Centre in Poreč, Croatia.

The event was headlined by a kickboxing heavyweight bout between Igor Jurković and Dževad Poturak.

FFC 6 marked the second FFC event headlined by Igor Jurković after FFC 3 in Split, Croatia, on 19 April 2013.

The co-main event featured two top kickboxing heavyweights. The Dutch Hesdy Gerges defeated Pavel Zhuravlev via split decision. The bout marked Zhuravlev's first FFC defeat after two wins.

Hungary's Laszlo Senyei defeated Ivica Trušček via unanimous decision in an MMA welterweight bout.

Ibrahim El Bouni beat Bosnian kickboxer Igor Emkić in 29 seconds via a KO.

At the post-fight presser, FFC President Orsat Zovko announced the upcoming fall events in Sarajevo (Bosnia and Herzegovina), Pula (Croatia), Zagreb (Croatia), Skopje (Macedonia) and Ljubljana (Slovenia).

Results

Main card
Weight class				Method	Round	Time	Notes
KB +95kg	Igor Jurković	def.	Dževad Poturak	Decision (unanimous)	3	3:00
KB +95kg	Hesdy Gerges	def.	Pavel Zhuravlev	Decision (unanimous)	3	3:00
MMA −77kg	Laszlo Senyei	def.	Ivica Trušček	Decision (unanimous)	3	5:00
MMA +93kg	Dorijan Ilić	def.	Emil Poljak	KO	1	2:10
KB −81kg	Miran Fabjan	def.	Ivan Bilić	Decision (unanimous)	3	3:00
KB −85kg	Ibrahim El Bouni	def.	Igor Emkić	KO	1	0:29
Preliminary card
KB +95kg	Mladen Kujundžić	def.	Nikola Dimkovski	Decision (unanimous)	3	3:00
MMA +93kg	Stefan Traunmuller	def.	Ivan Vitasović	Submission (RNC)	1	0:00
MMA −70kg	Teo Mikelić	def.	Samo Petje	Decision (unanimous)	3	3:00
MMA −70kg	Matija Blažičević	def.	Phillip Šarić	Submission (armbar)	2	2:31

==== FFC 7: Poturak vs. Munoz ====
FFC 7: Poturak vs. Munoz
- Promotion: Final Fight Championship
- Date: 13 March 2015
- Venue: Skenderija
- City: Sarajevo, Bosnia and Herzegovina

FFC 7: Poturak vs. Munoz was a mixed martial arts and kickboxing event produced by the Final Fight Championship that was held on 13 March 2015 at Skenderija in Sarajevo, Bosnia and Herzegovina.

FFC 7 was originally scheduled for 4 September 2013 but it was cancelled due to Poturak's injury and other technical issues. However, FFC wanted to produce an event in Sarajevo, Bosnia and Herzegovina, and the opportunity appeared two years later.

The event was headlined by a kickboxing heavyweight bout between Dževad Poturak and Frank Munoz, while the MMA headliner featured Tomislav Spahović and Kamen Georgiev.

Hungary's MMA prospect Laszlo Senyei finished Dawid Defort via GNP in the third round, while heavyweight kickboxers Tomislav Čikotić and Elmir Mehić were awarded the title of 'Fight of the night'.

Results

FFC 7 MMA
Weight Class				Method	Round	Time	Notes
Light Heavyweight	Tomislav Spahović	def.	Kamen Georgiev	Unanimous decision	3	5:00	
Welterweight	Laszlo Senyei	def.	Dawid Defort	KO (GNP)	3	4:34	
Featherweight	Ádám Borics	def.	Marko Burušić	Unanimous decision	3	5:00	
Welterweight	Vladimir Prodanović	def.	Ivan Skoko	KO (GNP)	1	1:55	
Heavyweight	Darko Stošić	def.	Dyonisios Papadopoulos	KO (GNP)	1	0:59	
Lightweight	Vladislav Genov	def.	Gergo Munczeberg	Submission (armbar)	1	2:16	

FFC 7 Kickboxing
Weight Class				Method	Round	Time	Notes
Heavyweight	Dževad Poturak	def.	Frank Munoz	Unanimous decision	3	3:00
Heavyweight	Tomislav Čikotić	def.	Elmir Mehić	Unanimous decision	4	3:00
Middleweight	Igor Emkić	def.	Nikita Chub	Unanimous decision	4	3:00
Middleweight	Denis Marjanović	def.	Boban Krušić	KO	2
Light Heavyweight	Antonio Plazibat	def.	Bojan Džepina	TKO	2	1:43
Light Heavyweight	Strahinja Denić	def.	Dženan Poturak	TKO (injury)	1	3:00

==== FFC 8: Zelg vs. Rodriguez ====
FFC 8: Zelg vs. Rodriguez
- Promotion: Final Fight Championship
- Date: 25 October 2013
- Venue: Arena Zagreb
- City: Zagreb, Croatia

FFC 8: Zelg vs. Rodriguez was a mixed martial arts and kickboxing event produced by the Final Fight Championship that was held on 25 October 2013 at Arena Zagreb, Zagreb, Croatia.

The event was headlined by an MMA catchweight bout between Zelg Galešić and Ricco Rodriguez with Rodriguez defeating his opponent via submission in the first round.

The co-main event featured a kickboxing heavyweight bout between Mladen Brestovac and Ali Cenik that went the distance in favor of Mladen Brestovac.

Glory's Jahfarr Wilnis made his FFC debut at FFC 8 in Zagreb, Croatia, where he lost to Tomáš Hron.

Results

Main card
Weight class				Method	Round	Time	Notes
MMA -95kg	Ricco Rodriguez	def.	Zelg Galešić	Submission (armbar)	1	3:50
KB +95kg	Mladen Brestovac	def.	Ali Cenik	Decision (unanimous)	3	3:00
KB +95kg	Tomáš Hron	def.	Jahfarr Wilnis	Decision (unanimous)	3	3:00
KB -80kg	Stevan Živković	def.	Miran Fabjan	Decision (split)	3	3:00
MMA −66kg	Francisco Albano Barrio	def.	Darko Banović	Decision (unanimous)	3	5:00
MMA −77kg	Primož Vrbinc	def.	Dušan Džakić	KO	1	1:19
FFC Challenger 08
MMA +95kg	Dion Staring	def.	Ante Delija	Submission (kimura)	2	2:42
MMA -70kg	Ivica Trušček	def.	Gojko Vuković	TKO	1	2:13
KB +95kg	Mladen Kujundžić	def.	Senid Imamović	KO	1	1:19
MMA −77kg	Laszlo Senyei	def.	Luka Jelčić	TKO	3	0:30
MMA −77kg	Matej Truhan	def.	Josif Al Said	KO	1	3:50

==== FFC 9: McSweeney vs. Traunmuller ====
FFC 9: McSweeney vs. Traunmuller
- Promotion: Final Fight Championship
- Date: 15 November 2013
- Venue: Tivoli Hall
- City: Ljubljana, Slovenia

FFC 9: McSweeney vs. Traunmuller was a mixed martial arts and kickboxing event produced by the Final Fight Championship that was held on 15 November 2013 at Tivoli Hall, Ljubljana, Slovenia.

In November 2013, FFC held its first event outside of Croatia. FFC 9 was also the first event in the FFC's history that featured two events in one night with kickboxing and MMA sections held separately.

The MMA part of the event was headlined by a heavyweight bout between James McSweeney and Stefan Traunmuller. At FFC 9 James McSweeney made his FFC debut and defeated Traunmuller by a first round submission via armbar.

The co-main event featured Primož Vrbinc and Joseph Leitner, while the most anticipated bout of the night was the grudge match between Slovenia's Lemmy Krušič and Vaso Bakočević fighting out of Montenegro that went the distance in favor of Krušič.

The kickboxing part of the event was headlined by Mirko Vorkapič and Chris Ngimbi with Vorkapić pulling an upset and defeating favored former It's Showtime champion Ngimbi.

In the co-main event Ibrahim El Bouni made a successful FFC return defeating favored local kickboxer Miran Fabjan.

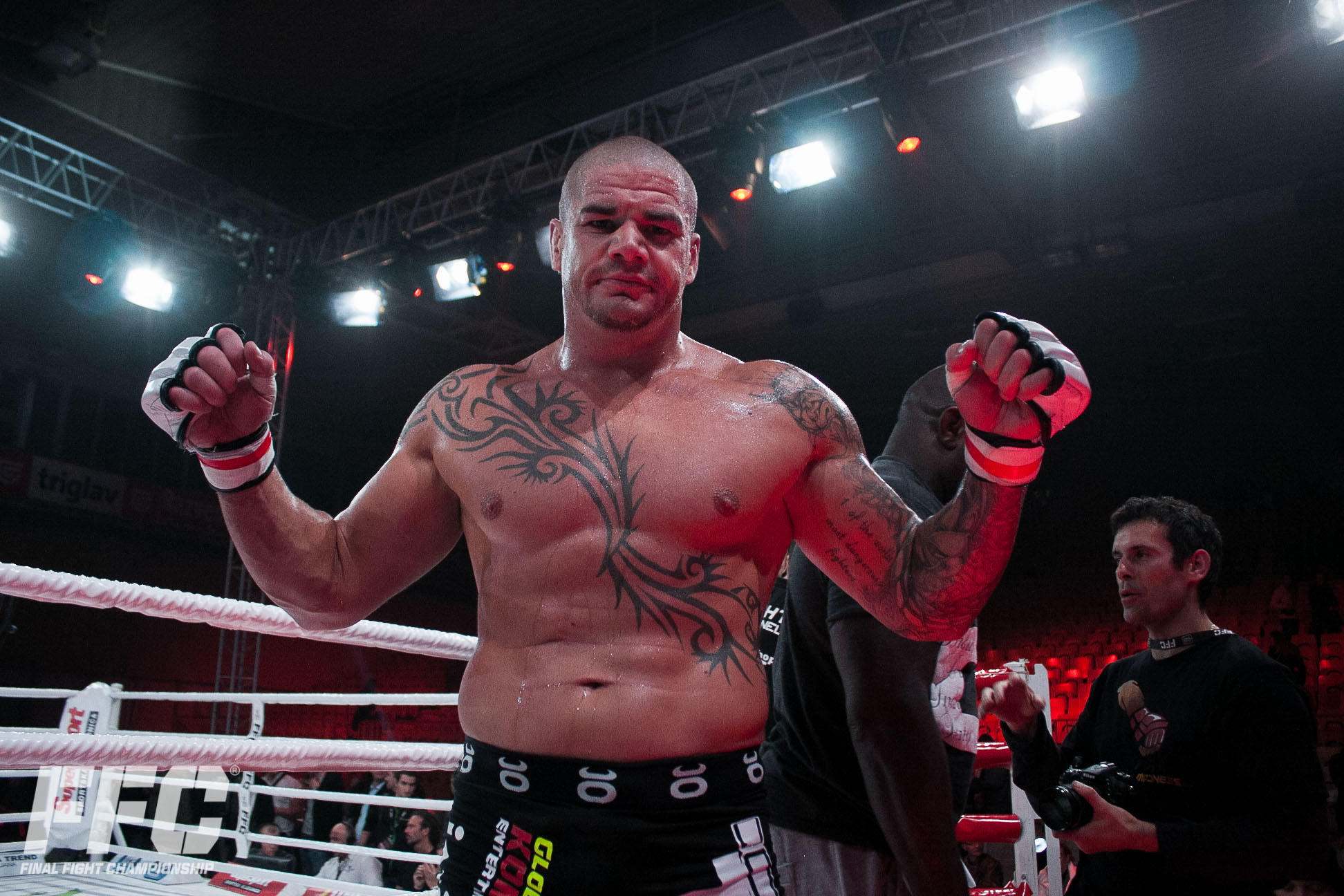
James McSweeney at FFC 9 in Ljubljana, Slovenia.

Results

FFC 9 MMA
Weight class				Method	Round	Time	Notes
MMA HW	James McSweeney	def.	Stefan Traunmuller	Submission (armbar)	1	0:35
MMA -77kg	Primož Vrbinc	def.	Joseph Leitner	Submission (standing guillotine choke)	3	4:53
MMA -73kg	Ivica Trušček	def.	Leonardo Zecchi	KO (left high kick)	1	0:18
MMA -66 kg	Lemmy Krušič	def.	Vaso Bakočević	Decision (unanimous)	3	5:00
MMA -84kg	Mattia Schiavolin	def.	Josip Artuković	Submission (heel hook)	1	2:24
FFC 9 Kickboxing
KB -71kg	Mirko Vorkapić	def.	Chris Ngimbi	Decision (unanimous)	3	3:00
KB -82kg	Ibrahim El Bouni	def.	Miran Fabjan	KO (left hook)	2	2:17
KB -77kg	Stevan Živković	def.	Grega Smole	Decision (unanimous)	3	3:00
KB -71kg	Samo Petje	def.	Mario Katić	KO (straight right)	2	1:35
KB -91kg	Ivan Stanić	def.	Strahinja Ivanović	TKO (low kick)	2	1:30
KB -85kg	Tadej Toplak	def.	Mesud Selimović	Decision (unanimous)	3	3:00

==== FFC 10: Rodriguez vs. Batzelas ====
FFC 10: Rodriguez vs. Batzelas
- Promotion: Final Fight Championship
- Date: 13 December 2013
- Venue: Boris Trajkovski Sports Center
- City: (North Macedonia) Skopje, Republic of Macedonia

FFC 10: Rodriguez vs. Batzelas was a mixed martial arts and kickboxing event produced by the Final Fight Championship that was held on 13 December 2013 at Boris Trajakovski Sports Center, Skopje, Republic of Macedonia.

The event was the first that the FFC has hosted in Skopje, Republic of Macedonia.

The MMA part of the event was headlined by a heavyweight bout between former UFC heavyweight champion Ricco Rodriguez and Greek mixed martial artist and former Olympic wrestler Nestoras Baltzelas. Rodriguez defeated his opponent via second-round TKO.

The co-main event featured Dutch/Albanian professional wrestler Gzim Selmani and Slovenia's Tomaž Simonič with Selmani winning the bout in the first round via RNC. Local MMA fighter Risto Dimitrov stepped into the ring versus Greece's Georgios Vardis eventually winning via decision.

The kickboxing part of the event was headlined by a heavyweight bout between Rustemi Kreshnik and Croatia's Dino Belošević while Mladen Brestovac vs. Kirk Krouba served as the co-main event. Tomáš Hron scored another FFC win after defeating Croatia's Igor Mihaljević in a heavyweight clash.

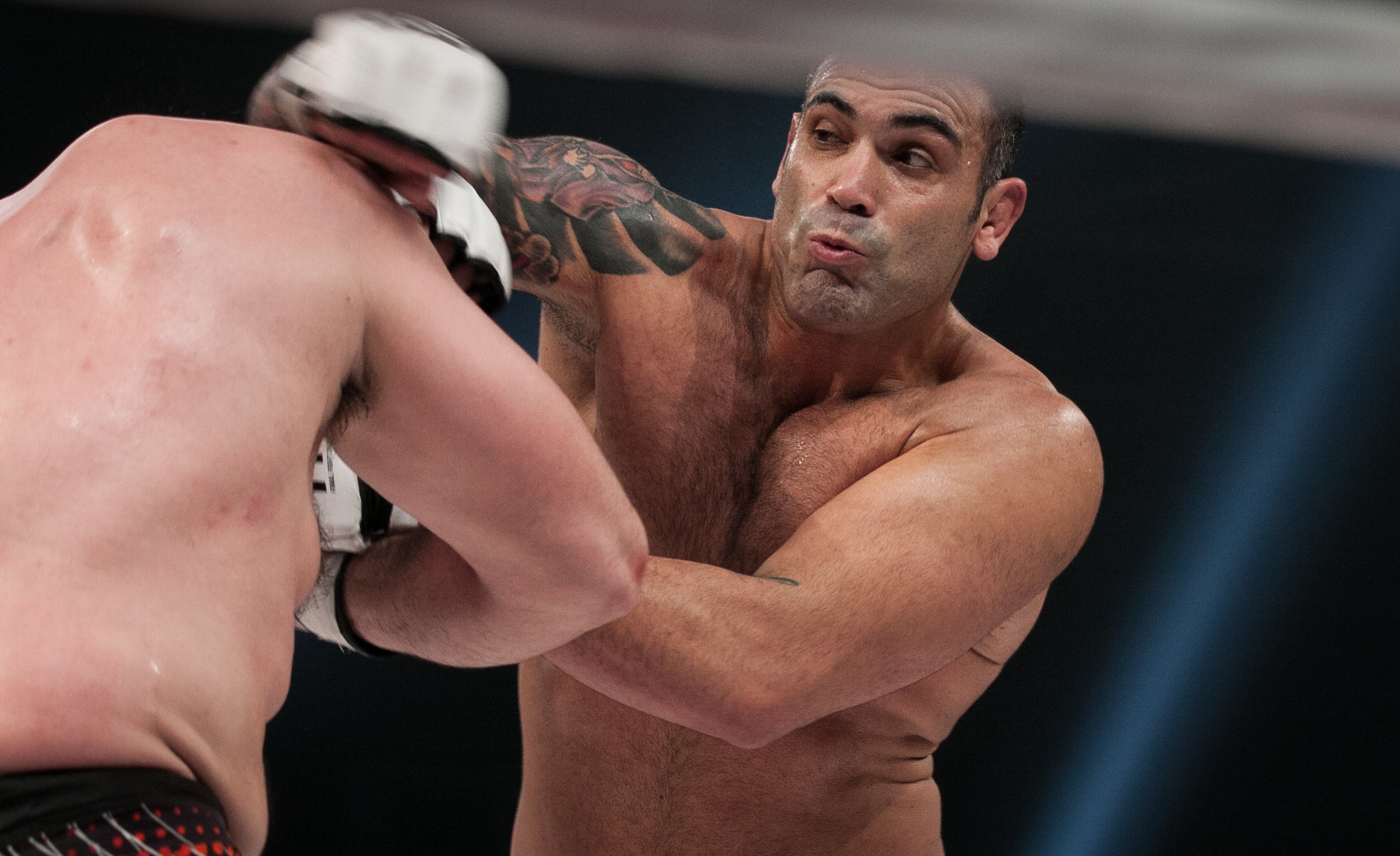
Ricco Rodriguez against Nestoras Batzelas at FFC 10 in Skopje, Republic of Macedonia.

Results

FFC 10 MMA
Weight class				Method	Round	Time	Notes
MMA HW	Ricco Rodriguez	def.	Nestoras Batzelas	TKO (punches)	2	3:33
MMA HW	Gzim Selmani	def.	Tomaž Simonič	Submission (arm triangle choke)	1	1:54
MMA -70kg	Vaso Bakočević	def.	Stanislav Enchev	Decision (unanimous)	3	5:00
MMA −70kg	Kostadin Enev	def.	Patrick Pereša	Submission (Guillotine Choke)	3	4:13
MMA -66kg	Risto Dimitrov	def.	Georgios Vardis	Decision (unanimous)	3	5:00
MMA -72kg	Matija Blažičević	def.	Viktor Stojanov	TKO (punches)	2	1:51
FFC 10 Kickboxing
KB HW	Rustemi Kreshnik	def.	Dino Belošević	Decision (unanimous)	3	3:00
KB HW	Mladen Brestovac	def.	Kirk Krouba	Decision (unanimous)	3	3:00
KB HW	Tomáš Hron	def.	Igor Mihaljević	Decision (unanimous)	3	3:00
KB -77kg	Shkodran Veseli	def.	Ile Risteski	KO (right high kick)	1	1:15
KB -85kg	Igor Emkić	def.	Kleanthis Mavropoulos	Decision (unanimous)	3	3:00
KB -70kg	Teo Mikelić	def.	Slobodan Kajmakoski	Decision (unanimous)	3	3:00

==== FFC Futures 1 ====
FFC Futures 1
- Promotion: Final Fight Championship
- Date: 1 March 2014
- Venue: Marino Cvetković Sports Hall
- City: Opatija, Croatia

FFC Futures 1 was a mixed martial arts and kickboxing event produced by the Final Fight Championship that was held on 1 March 2014 at Marino Cvetković Sports Hall in Opatija, Croatia.

In 2014 Final Fight Championship launched its FFC Futures series – a series of kickboxing and MMA tournaments for younger, aspiring fighters. The winners of the tournament signed a deal with the promotion while the event also featured two super fights including Stipe Bekavac vs. Eddie Sanchez and Ivan Stanić vs. Patrick Van Rees.

Results

MMA
Weight class				Method	Round	Time	Notes
MMA HW	Stipe Bekavac	def.	Lajo Calvaruso	Submission (Guillotine Choke)	1	0:25
MMA HW	Nikola Janjić	def.	Jasmin Begisholli	KO			(Note: Heavyweight tournament final.)
MMA -93kg	Strahinja Denić	def.	Tigo Giljević	Decision (unanimous)	3	5:00	(Note: -93kg tournament final.)
MMA −84kg	Ivica Čubić	def.	Tomislav Burac	Submission (Triangle Choke)	1	0:29	(Note: -84kg tournament final.)
MMA -77kg	Saša Drobac	def.	Vladimir Prodanović	KO (Punch)	1	2:08	(Note: -77kg tournament final.)
MMA -70kg	Aleksandar Rakas	def.	Philip Šarić	TKO (punches)	1	2:34	(Note: -70kg tournament final.)
Kickboxing
KB -91	Patrick Van Rees	def.	Ivan Stanić	KO (Right Cross)	1	2:00
KB HW	Nato Cvitan	def.	Miloš Ivas	Decision	3	3:00	(Note: Heavyweight tournament final.)
KB -91	Stipe Stipetić	def.	Calin Iovan	KO			(Note: -91kg tournament final.)
KB -85kg	Milan Filipović	def.	Adam Evloev	Decision	3	3:00	(Note: -85kg tournament final.)
KB -77kg	Toni Mikelić	def.	Alban Dexari	Decision	3	3:00	(Note: -77kg tournament final.)
KB -70kg	Marko Adamović	def.	Jovica Kokot	Decision	3	3:00	(Note: -70kg tournament final.)

==== FFC 11: Jurković vs. Kaluđerović ====
FFC 11: Jurković vs. Kaluđerović was a mixed martial arts and kickboxing event produced by the Final Fight Championship that was held 4 April 2014 at Gradski vrt Hall in Osijek, Croatia.

The kickboxing part of the event was headlined by a light heavyweight bout between Igor Jurković and Jovan Kaluđerović.

The MMA part of the event was headlined by a heavyweight bout between Stipe Bekavac and former UFC and Bellator fighter Eddie "The Manic Hispanic" Sanchez.

In the co-main event of the MMA part of the event Saša Milinković submitted Stefan Traunmuller via arm triangle choke, while Bekavac brutally KO'ed Sanchez in the first round of the headliner.

The first bout of the event featured Ivica Tadijanov and Poland's Marcin Prachnio. Croatia's Ivan Gluhak beat Luca Vitali by a TKO.

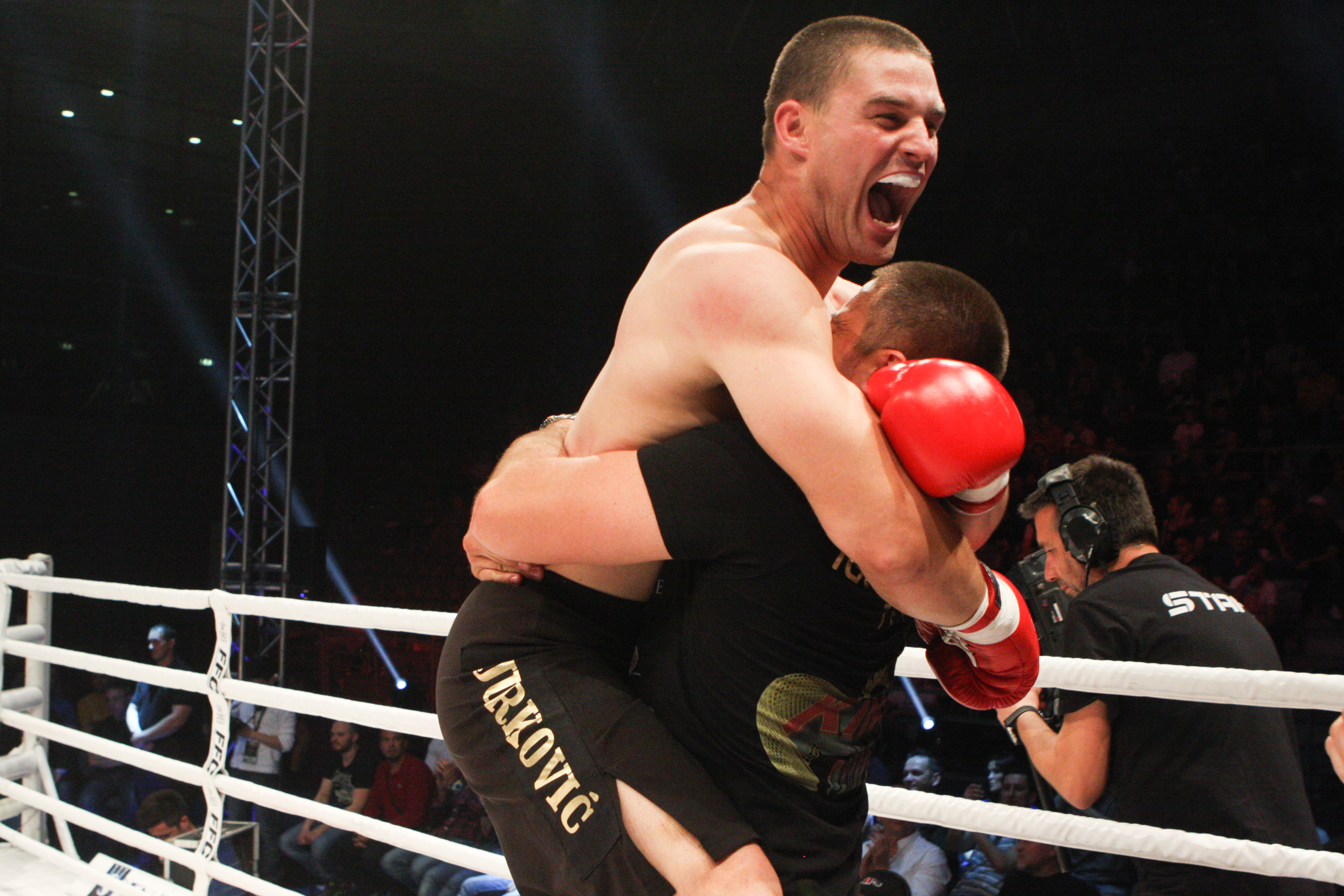
Igor Jurković celebrating at FFC 11 in Osijek, Croatia.

Results

FFC 11 Kickboxing
Weight class				Method	Round	Time	Notes
KB -95kg	Igor Jurković	def.	Jovan Kaluđerović	KO (liver kick)	1	1:47
KB -77kg	Shkodran Veseli	def.	Stevan Živković	KO (flying knee)	3	1:14
KB -95kg	Patrick Van Rees	def.	Dženan Poturak	KO (front kick)	2	1:47
KB HW	Ante Verunica	def.	Tomislav Čikotić	Extension round decision (unanimous)	4	3:00
KB -70kg	Alen Štritof	def.	Saša Stošić	Decision (unanimous)	3	3:00
KB -66kg	Ivan Zidar	def.	Samuel Hadzima	Decision (unanimous)	3	3:00
FFC 11 MMA
MMA -98kg	Stjepan Bekavac	def.	Eddie Sanchez	KO (straight left)	1	1:07
MMA HW	Saša Milinković	def.	Stefan Traunmuller	Submission (one armed guillotine choke)	1
MMA -93kg	Matej Batinić	def.	Sandor Okros	Decision (unanimous)	3	5:00
MMA -77kg	Ivan Gluhak	def.	Luca Vitali	TKO (punches)	2
MMA -84kg	Josip Artuković	def.	Marko Drmonjič	Decision (unanimous)	3	5:00
MMA −93kg	Ivica Tadijanov	def.	Marcin Prachnio	Decision (unanimous)	3	5:00

==== FFC 12: Fabjan vs. Daley ====
FFC 12: Fabjan vs. Daley
- Promotion: Final Fight Championship
- Date: 25 April 2014
- Venue: Tivoli Hall
- City: Ljubljana, Slovenia

FFC 12: Fabjan vs. Daley was a mixed martial arts and kickboxing event produced by the Final Fight Championship that was held 25 April 2014 at Tivoli Hall, Ljubljana, Slovenia.

The event was the second that the FFC has hosted at Tivoli Hall in Ljubljana, Slovenia.

The kickboxing part of the event was headlined by a welterweight bout between Bellator's Paul Daley and Miran Fabjan with Daley knocking our Fabjan in the second round

The co-main event bout between Croatia's Teo Mikelić and Slovenia's Mirko Vorkapič ended via doctor's stoppage in the first round since Vorkapič sustained a periorbital hematoma. The kickboxing part of the event kicked off brutally with Mladen Kujunđić's knockout win over Dženan Poturak. In a heavyweight match up Elmir Mehić defeated local favorite Rok Štrucl, while Slovenia's up-and-comer Samo Petje stopped Kevin Hesseling in the first round. The only kickboxing bout that went the distance was the one between Denis Chorchyp and Darian Paladin.

In the MMA headliner Dion 'The Soldier' Staring defeated Tomaž Simonič via submission.

The bout between Hungary's Viktor Halmi and Slovenia's Primož Vrbinc served as the co-main event.

Croatia's MMA up-and-comer Luka Jelčić and Krasimir Georgiev opened the MMA part of the event with Jelčić finishing his opponent via GNP. Antun Račić showcased his ground game finishing Zoltan Turi via armbar. Croatia's Ivica Trušček defeated Michael Pfunder via RNC, while Slovenia's Bor Bratovž submitted his opponent in the first round.

Results

FFC Kickboxing
Weight class				Method	Round	Time	Notes
KB -81	Paul Daley	def.	Miran Fabjan	KO (Right straight)	2	2:41
KB -70	Teo Mikelić	def.	Mirko Vorkapič	TKO (Doctor stoppage)	1	1:23
KB HW	Elmir Mehić	def.	Rok Štrucl	TKO (Strikes)	2	2:19
KB -70kg	Samo Petje	def.	Kevin Hesseling	KO (Punches and knees)	1
KB -95kg	Denis Chorchyp	def.	Darian Paladin	Decision (Unanimous)	3	3:00
KB -95	Mladen Kujundžić	def.	Dženan Poturak	TKO (Body kick)	1
FFC MMA
MMA HW	Dion Staring	def.	Tomaž Simonič	Submission (Americana)	1	2:55
MMA -77kg	Viktor Halmi	def.	Primož Vrbinc	TKO (Strikes)	2	2:00
MMA -83kg	Bor Bratovž	def.	Giorgi Ivanov	Submission (Rear naked choke)	1	1:45
MMA -70kg	Ivica Trušček	def.	Michael Pfunder	Submission (Rear naked choke)	1	3:21
MMA -66	Antun Račić	def.	Zoltan Turi	Submission (Armbar)	1	4:45
MMA -70	Luka Jelčić	def.	Krasimir Georgiev	TKO (Punches)	1	2:20

==== FFC Futures 2 ====
FFC Futures 2
- Promotion: Final Fight Championship
- Date: 3 May 2014
- Venue: Marino Cvetković Sports Hall
- City: Opatija, Croatia

FFC Futures 2 was a mixed martial arts and kickboxing event produced by the Final Fight Championship that was held on 3 May 2014 at Marino Cvetković Sports Hall in Opatija, Croatia.

The event was the second in the FFC Futures series – a series of kickboxing and MMA tournaments for younger, aspiring fighters. The winners of the tournament signed a deal with the promotion while the event also featured two super fights including an MMA heavyweight bout between Ante Delija and Ruben Wolf as well as a heavyweight kickboxing match between Mladen Brestovac and Tomas Pakutinskas.

Results

MMA
Weight Class				Method	Round	Time	Notes
Heavyweight	Ante Delija	def.	Ruben Wolf	Submission (Guillotine Choke)	2	1:28
Light Heavyweight	Martin Batur	def.	Ivan Karacic	Submission (Guillotine Choke)	1	3:20	-93 kg tournament final.
MMA -93 kg	Martin Batur	def.	Senad Bašić	KO	1		Semifinals.
Middleweight	Pleurat Smajli	def.	Asmir Sadikovic	TKO (Punches)	1	2:49	-84 kg tournament final.
MMA −84 kg	Pleurat Smajli	def.	Tomislav Burec	Submission (Guillotine Choke)	1		Semifinals.
MMA −84 kg	Asmir Sadikovic	def.	Ermin Hodžić	Submission (Shoulder lock)	1		Semifinals.
MMA −84 kg	Tomislav Burec	def.	Antonio Bičanić	Decision (Unanimous)	1	5:00	Quarterfinals.
MMA −84 kg	Ermin Hodžić	def.	Domenik Andreić	Decision (Unanimous)	1	5:00	Quarterfinals.
Welterweight	Tadija Majić	def.	Ivica Vranko	Submission (Heel Hook)	1	0:58	-77 kg tournament final.
MMA -77 kg	Tadija Majić	def.	Ivica Jakopić	Submission (Heel Hook)	1		Semifinals.
MMA -77 kg	Ivica Vranko	def.	Nemanja Milaković	Decision (Split)	1	5:00	Semifinals.
MMA -77 kg	Tadija Majić	def.	Marin Radovan	TKO (High Kick, GNP)			Quarterfinals.
MMA -77 kg	Ivica Vranko	def.	Pavle Tomić	Decision (Unanimous)	1	5:00	Quarterfinals.
MMA -77 kg	Nemanja Milaković	def.	Amir Komić	Changed Decision	1	5:00	Quarterfinals. Supervisor changed decision.
Lightweight	Jasmin Ilijaš	def.	Velimir Rašić	Submission (Armbar)	1	1:44	-70 kg tournament final.
MMA -70 kg	Jasmin Ilijaš	def.	Mislav Major	Submission (Armbar)	1		Semifinals.
MMA -70 kg	Velimir Rašić	def.	Sebastijan Emini	Decision (Unanimous)	1	5:00	Semifinals.
Kickboxing
Heavyweight	Mladen Brestovac	def.	Tomas Pakutinskas	TKO (Arm injury)	1	0:36
Heavyweight	Dino Belošević	def.	Simon Krizmanić	Decision	3	2:00	Heavyweight tournament final.
Light Heavyweight	Andrija Lekić	def.	Mitar Dugalić	Decision	3	2:00	-91 kg tournament final.
KB -91	Andrija Lekić	def.	Mitar Dugalić	Decision (Unanimous)	2	2:00	Semifinals.
KB -91	Draženko Lovrić	def.	Tomislav Sutic	Decision (Unanimous)	2	2:00	Semifinals.
KB -91	Mitar Dugalić	def.	Robert Grgurič	Decision (Unanimous)	2	2:00	Quarterfinals.
Middleweight	Matijas Barić	def.	Nenad Šančić	KO (punches)	2		-85 kg tournament final.
KB -85 kg	Nenad Šančić	def.	Živković	KO	1		Semifinals.
Welterweight	Jasmin Bajrović	def.	Anđelko Rebić	KO (strikes)	2		-77 kg tournament final.
KB -77 kg	Anđelko Rebić	def.	Nikola Resanović	Decision (Split)	2	2:00	Semifinals.
KB -77 kg	Jasmin Bajrović	def.	Aleksandar Nježić	KO	1		Semifinals.
KB -77 kg	Anđelko Rebić	def.	Dejvid Kajević	RTD			Quarterfinals.
KB -77 kg	Jasmin Bajrović	def.	Hamza Sivro	Decision (Unanimous)	2	2:00	Quarterfinals.
Lightweight	Finko Barišić	def.	Dino Taći	Decision	3	2:00	-70 kg tournament final.
KB -70 kg	Dino Taći	def.	Michele Bulesic	Decision (Unanimous)	2	2:00	Semifinals.
KB -70 kg	Finko Barišić	def.	Borut Turk	Decision (Unanimous)	2	2:00	Semifinals.
KB -70 kg	Michele Bulesic	def.	Jovica Kokot	Decision (Unanimous)	2	2:00	Quarterfinals.
KB -70 kg	Dino Taći	def.	Bojan Kujavec	Decision (Unanimous)	2	2:00	Quarterfinals.
KB -70 kg	Finko Barišić	def.	Hrvoje Grivičić	Decision (Unanimous)	2	2:00	Quarterfinals.
KB -70 kg	Borut Turk	def.	Albin Fajković	RTD			Quarterfinals.

==== FFC 13: Jurković vs. Tavares ====
FFC 13: Jurković vs. Tavares
- Promotion: Final Fight Championship
- Date: 6 June 2014
- Venue: Krešimir Ćosić Hall
- City: Zadar, Croatia

FFC 13: Jurković vs. Tavares was a mixed martial arts and kickboxing event produced by the Final Fight Championship that was held 6 June 2014 at Krešimir Ćosić Hall in Zadar, Croatia.

The event was the second that the FFC has hosted at Krešimir Ćosić Hall in Zadar, Croatia.

The event was headlined by a light heavyweight kickboxing bout between Igor Jurković and Luis Tavares. Jurković dominated throughout the whole match and won via unanimous decision.

In the co-main event Sergei Lascenko TKO'ed Dimitris Delis.

The MMA part of the event was headlined by a heavyweight bout between Ruben Wolf fighting out of Germany and Croatia's Saša Milinković. Wolf brutally KO'ed his opponent via soccer kick.

The grueling bout between Matej Batinić and Ivan Brkljača served as the co-main event.

Results

FFC 13 Kickboxing
Weight Class				Method	Round	Time	Notes
Light heavyweight	Igor Jurković	def.	Luis Tavares	Decision (unanimous)	3	3:00
Heavyweight	Sergei Lascenko	def.	Dimitris Delis	TKO (towel thrown)	2	1:40
Welterweight	Shkodran Veseli	def.	Vlado Konsky	Decision (unanimous)	3	3:00
Middleweight	Ibrahim El Bouni	def.	Denis Marjanović	Decision (unanimous)	3	3:00	Denis Marjanović was late replacement for Boban Krušić.
Heavyweight	Ante Verunica	def.	Elmir Mehić	Decision (unanimous)	3	3:00
Lightweight	Tigran Movsisyan	def.	Slobodan Kajmakovski	Decision (unanimous)	3	3:00
FFC 13 MMA
Heavyweight	Ruben Wolf	def.	Saša Milinković	KO (soccer kick)	2	3:00
Light Heavyweight	Matej Batinić	def.	Ivan Brkljača	Decision (unanimous)	3	5:00
Lightweight	Francisco Albano Barrio	def.	Patrick Pereša	Submission (rear-naked choke)	3	0:50
Light Heavyweight	Marcin Prachnio	def.	Božo Mikulić	KO (punches)	1	2:56
Featherweight	Darko Banović	def.	Matija Blažičević	Decision (unanimous)	3	5:00
Welterweight	Hrvoje Martić	def.	Fabio Ambrosini	TKO (punches)	1	0:35

==== FFC Futures 3 ====
FFC Futures 3
- Promotion: Final Fight Championship
- Date: 27 September 2014
- Venue: Sutinska Vrela Sports Hall
- City: Zagreb, Croatia

FFC Futures 3 was a mixed martial arts and kickboxing event produced by the Final Fight Championship that was held on 27 September 2014 at Sutinska Vrela Sports Hall in Zagreb, Croatia.

The event was the third in the FFC Futures series – a series of kickboxing and MMA tournaments for younger, aspiring fighters. The winners of the tournament signed a deal with the promotion while the event also featured two super fights including an MMA heavyweight bout between Ante Delija and Archontis Taxiarchis as well as a heavyweight kickboxing match between Mladen Brestovac and Luca Panto.

Results

Kickboxing
Weight Class				Method	Round	Time	Notes
KB HW	Mladen Brestovac	def.	Luca Panto	TKO (arm injury)	1		Luca Panto was late replacement for Ibrahim Araab.
Light Heavyweight	Enver Šljivar	def.	Igor Mihaljević	Decision (unanimous)	3	3:00	Šljivar was last day replacement.
Middleweight	Nikita Chub	def.	Marin Čarapina	Decision	3	2:00	-85 kg tournament final.
KB -85 kg	Nikita Chub	def.	Petar Jaman	Decision (Unanimous)	2	2:00	Semifinals.
KB -85 kg	Marin Čarapina	def.	Marko Rupčić	Decision (Split)	2	2:00	Semifinals.
KB -85 kg	Nikita Chub	def.	Matija-Valentin Okičić	KO	1	0:41	Quarterfinals.
KB -85 kg	Petar Jaman	def.	Antonio Kulaš				Quarterfinals.
KB -85 kg	Marko Rupčić	def.	Rene Wimmer	Decision (Split)	2	2:00	Quarterfinals.
Welterweight	Dezso Bakacs	def.	Marko Dragović	Decision	3	2:00	-77 kg tournament final.
KB -77 kg	Marko Dragović	def.	Andi Vrtačić	Decision (Unanimous)	2	2:00	Semifinals.
KB -77 kg	Dezso Bakacs	def.	Marko Milanović	Decision (Split)	2	2:00	Semifinals.
KB -77 kg	Marko Dragović	def.	Nikola Resanović	TKO	2	1:27	Quarterfinals.
KB -77 kg	Andi Vrtačić	def.	Kristijan Franjić	Decision (Unanimous)	2	2:00	Quarterfinals.
KB -77 kg	Dezso Bakacs	def.	Matija Mađerić	KO	2	1:38	Quarterfinals.
Lightweight	Valentin Rybalko	def.	Nikola Cimeša	Decision (Split)	3	2:00	-70 kg tournament final.
KB -70 kg	Valentin Rybalko	def.	Denis Bartol	TKO	1	1:58	Semifinals.
KB -70 kg	Nikola Cimeša	def.	Dino Taći	Decision (Split)	2	2:00	Semifinals.
KB -70 kg	Valentin Rybalko	def.	Nikola Bos	TKO	2	2:00	Quarterfinals.
KB -70 kg	Denis Bartol	def.	Bojan Kujavec	Decision (Unanimous)	2	2:00	Quarterfinals.
KB -70 kg	Dino Taći	def.	Albin Fajković	Decision (Unanimous)	2	2:00	Quarterfinals.
MMA
Heavyweight	Ante Delija	def.	Archontis Taxiarchis	Submission (North-South Choke)	1	2:59	Taxiarchis was late replacement for Nestoras Batzelas.
Lightweight	Matej Truhan	def.	Zslolt Fenyes	Submission (Armbar)	3	3:08	Fenyes was late replacement for Karoly Kiss.
Heavyweight	Fahrudin Ferizović	def.	Mate Zentai	Submission (Keylock)	1	4:23	Heavyweight tournament final.
Light Heavyweight	Ivica Tadijanov	def.	Viktor Vasić	Submission (Armbar)	1	4:59	-93 kg tournament final.
MMA -93 kg	Viktor Vasić	def.	Jeton Azemi	Submission (Keylock)	1	2:46	Semifinals.
MMA -93 kg	Ivica Tadijanov	def.	Peter Norbert	Decision (Majority)	1	5:00	Semifinals.
Middleweight	Bruno Guštović	def.	Mario Makarić	Decision (Unanimous)	2	5:00	-84 kg tournament final.
MMA −84 kg	Mario Makarić	def.	Ermin Hodžić	Decision (Majority)	1	5:00	Semifinals.
MMA −84 kg	Bruno Guštović	def.	Senad Bašić	Decision (Majority)	1	5:00	Semifinals.
MMA −84 kg	Ermin Hodžić	def.	Pavlo Lyakh	Decision (Unanimous)	1	5:00	Quarterfinals.
MMA −84 kg	Mario Makarić	def.	Mario Gažić	TKO	1	0:41	Quarterfinals.
MMA −84 kg	Senad Bašić	def.	Attila Mozsi	Decision (Unanimous)	1	5:00	Quarterfinals.
Welterweight	Vladimir Prodanović	def.	Nemanja Milaković	Submission (Armbar)	1	1:54	-77 kg tournament final.
MMA -77 kg	Nemanja Milaković	def.	Viktor Stojanov	Decision (Unanimous)	1	5:00	Semifinals.
MMA -77 kg	Vladimir Prodanović	def.	Laszlo Benko	TKO	1	1:31	Semifinals.
Lightweight	Stefan Zvijer	def.	Tilen Kolarič	Submission (Kneebar)	1	2:23	-70 kg tournament final.
MMA -70 kg	Stefan Zvijer	def.	Dževad Muftić	Decision (Unanimous)	1	5:00	Semifinals.
MMA -70 kg	Tilen Kolarič	def.	Velimir Rašić	KO	1	1:36	Semifinals.
MMA -70 kg	Dževad Muftić	def.	Luka Šebalj	Decision (Unanimous)	1	5:00	Quarterfinals.

==== FFC 14: Račić vs. Krušič ====
FFC 14: Račić vs. Krušič
- Promotion: Final Fight Championship
- Date: 3 October 2014
- Venue: Tivoli Hall
- City: Ljubljana, Slovenia

FFC 14: Račić vs. Krušić was a mixed martial arts and kickboxing event produced by the Final Fight Championship that was held 3 October 2014 at Tivoli Hall in Ljubljana, Slovenia.

The event was the third that the FFC has hosted at Tivoli Hall in Ljubljana, Slovenia.

FFC 14 also featured FFC's inaugural kickboxing title bout that featured Samo Petje and Teo Mikelić in lightweight division as well as FFC's inaugural MMA title bout between Lemmy Krušič and Antun Račićin featherweight division.

The MMA part of the event was headlined by an inaugural featherweight title bout between Croatia's Antun Račić and Slovenia's Lemmy Krušič. After three grueling rounds, Račić won via unanimous decision and thus became the FFC's first featherweight MMA champion.

In the MMA co-event, Poland's light heavyweight Marcin Prachnio brutally TKO'ed Croatia's Stipe Bekavac.

The kickboxing part of the event was headlined by an inaugural lightweight match between Slovenia's Samo Petje and Croatia's Teo Mikelić who was KO'ed in the first round. Samo Petje became FFC's first kickboxing champion.

In the co-main event, Slovenia's light heavyweight Denis Chorchyp defeated Dženan Poturak.

Results

FFC 14 MMA
Weight Class				Method	Round	Time	Notes
Featherweight	Antun Račić	def.	Lemmy Krušič	Decision (unanimous)	3	5:00	For the Vacant FFC MMA Featherweight Championship.
Light Heavyweight	Marcin Prachnio	def.	Stipe Bekavac	TKO (knees)	1	0:35
Light Heavyweight	Tomislav Spahović	def.	Sandor Okros	Decision (unanimous)	3	5:00
Lightweight	Luka Jelčić	def.	Elia Madau	TKO (head kick)	1	1:08
Middleweight	Pavel Doroftei	def.	Ivan Skoko	Submission (heel hook)	1	1:31
Welterweight	Vladislav Kanchev	def.	Laszlo Benko	KO (punch)	1	3:40
FFC 14 Kickboxing
Lightweight	Samo Petje	def.	Teo Mikelić	KO (high kick)	1	1:05	For the Vacant FFC Kickboxing Lightweight Championship.
Light Heavyweight	Denis Chorchyp	def.	Dženan Poturak	KO (right hook)	1	2:55
Middleweight	Miran Fabjan	def.	Boban Krušić	Decision (unanimous)	3	3:00
Lightweight	Valentin Rybalko	def.	Mourad Tounnouti	Decision (unanimous)	3	3:00
Welterweight	Ivan Bilić	def.	Alan Karczewski	Decision (majority)	3	3:00
Light Heavyweight	Vasil Ducar	def.	Miloš Ivas	KO (punches)	2	1:54

==== FFC Futures 4 ====
FFC Futures 4
- Promotion: Final Fight Championship
- Date: 21 November 2014
- Venue: Žatika Sport Centre
- City: Poreč, Croatia

FFC Futures 4 was a mixed martial arts and kickboxing event produced by the Final Fight Championship that was held on 21 November 2014 at Žatika Sport Center in Poreč, Croatia.

The event was the fourth in the FFC Futures series – a series of kickboxing and MMA tournaments for younger, aspiring fighters. The winners of the tournament signed a deal with the promotion.

Results

MMA
Weight Class				Method	Round	Time	Notes
Lightweight	Hrvoje Stepić	def.	Burhan Ameti	Submission (rear naked choke)	1	2:25	-70 kg tournament final
Welterweight	Marko Ostanek	def.	Asmir Sadiković	Submission (rear naked choke)	1	2:20	-77 kg tournament final
Middleweight	Tomislav Burec	def.	Edin Brkičević	Submission (armbar)	1	4:59	-84 kg tournament final
Light Heavyweight	Gordian Schober	def.	Jakob Nedoh	Submission (armbar)	1	3:22	-93 kg tournament final
Heavyweight	Jani Istvan	def.	Josip Perica	Decision (unanimous)	3	5:00	HW tournament final
Kickboxing
Lightweight	Manuel Smoljan	def.	Nikola Cimeša	KO (punches)	2	1:29	-70 kg tournament final
Welterweight	Andi Vrtačić	def.	Marko Dragović	Decision (unanimous)	3	3:00	-77 kg tournament final
Middleweight	Ivan Čuklin	def.	Marko Rupčić	TKO (punches)	2	0:56	-85 kg tournament final
Light Heavyweight	Nikola Noveski	def.	Nenad Ćosić	TKO (punches)	1	2:17	-91 kg tournament final
Heavyweight	Tomislav Čikotić	def.	Janos Kolzfan	Decision (unanimous)	3	3:00	HW tournament final

==== FFC 15: Jurković vs. Stolzenbach ====
FFC 15: Jurković vs. Stolzenbach
- Promotion: Final Fight Championship
- Date: 21 November 2014
- Venue: Žatika Sport Centre
- City: Poreč, Croatia

FFC 15: Jurković vs. Stolzenbach was a mixed martial arts and kickboxing event produced by the Final Fight Championship that was held on 21 November 2014 at Žatika Sport Center in Poreč, Croatia.

The event was headlined by a light heavyweight kickboxing bout between Igor Jurković and Dennis Stolzenbach.

In the kickboxing co-main event, FFC lightweight champion Samo Petje fought Milan Paleš in a non-title bout and won via TKO in the second round.

The MMA part of the event was headlined by the inaugural FFC MMA lightweight title bout between Viktor Halmi and Matej Truhan. Hungary's Viktor Halmi won via TKO in the third round.

MMA co-main event featured a featherweight bout between Filip Pejić and Francisco Albano Barrio that ended with a highlight reel TKO.

Results

FFC 15 Kickboxing
Weight Class				Method	Round	Time	Notes
Light Heavyweight	Igor Jurković	def.	Dennis Stolzenbach	Decision (unanimous)	3	3:00	For the Vacant FFC Kickboxing Light Heavyweight Championship.
Lightweight	Samo Petje ©	def.	Milan Paleš	TKO (punches)	2		Non-title fight.
Heavyweight	Sergei Lascenko	vs.	Elmir Mehić				Canceled.
Light Heavyweight	Aleksandr Bodruchin	def.	Mladen Kujundžić	KO (punch)	1
Middleweight	Denis Marjanović	def.	Mesud Selimović	Decision (unanimous)	3	3:00
Lightweight	Tigran Movsisyan	def.	Martin Anwar	Decision (unanimous)	3	3:00
Welterweight	Grega Smole	def.	Ivan Bilić	Decision (unanimous)	3	3:00
FFC 15 MMA
Lightweight	Viktor Halmi	def.	Matej Truhan	TKO (punches)	3	2:10	For the Vacant FFC MMA Lightweight Championship.
Featherweight	Filip Pejić	def.	Francisco Albano Barrio	TKO (uppercut & punches)	1	0:40
Light Heavyweight	Nicolai Salchow	def.	Matej Batinić	TKO (punches)	1	0:53
Heavyweight	Ruben Wolf	def.	Ivo Skopljak	Submission (neck crank)	2
Welterweight	Ivan Gluhak	vs.	Stanislav Kanchev	Draw	3	5:00
Welterweight	Laszlo Senyei	vs.	Primož Vrbinc				Canceled.
Lightweight	Slobodan Maksimović	def.	Patrick Pereša	Decision (unanimous)	3	5:00

==== FFC 16: Sakara vs. Browarski ====
FFC 16: Sakara vs. Browarski
- Promotion: Final Fight Championship
- Date: 6 December 2014
- Venue: Multiversum Schwechat
- City: Vienna, Austria

FFC 16: Sakara vs. Browarski was a mixed martial arts, kickboxing and boxing event produced by the Final Fight Championship that was held on 6 December 2014 at Multiversum Schwechat in Vienna, Austria.

This event was the first FFC event hosted in Vienna, Austria.

The event was headlined by a light heavyweight MMA bout between former UFC fighter Alessio Sakara and Maciej Browarski. Nandor Guelmino was expected to face Croatia's heavyweight Maro Perak in the headliner, but he pulled out due to injury.

In the MMA co-main event, Philipp Schranz defeated Lemmy Kušič via guillotine in the first round.

The kickboxing part of the event was headlined by a welterweight inaugural title bout between Shkodran Veseli and Douli Chen. Veseli was expected to face Paul Daley, but Daley pulled out.

In the kickboxing co-main event Fadi Meriza did his farewell bout against Gianfranco Capurso, knocking Capursko out in the first round.

FFC 16 was FFC's first event that introduced boxing matches on its preliminary card as well the first FFC event that featured female boxers. Nicole Wesner defeated Gina Chamie for the vacant WIBF Woman's International lightweight title and vacant World Boxing Federation female lightweight title.

Results

FFC 16 MMA
Weight Class				Method	Round	Time	Notes
Heavyweight	Nandor Guelmino	def.	Maro Perak				Canceled, Nandor injured.
Light Heavyweight	Alessio Sakara	vs.	Maciej Browarski	NC (overturned loss)	1	3:20
Featherweight	Philipp Schranz	def.	Lemmy Krušič	Submission (Standing Guillotine Choke)	1	2:31
Light Heavyweight	Aleksandar Rakić	def.	Marcin Prachnio	TKO	3	3:00
Welterweight	Primož Vrbinc	def.	Adin Buljubašić	Submission (RNC)	1	3:59
Featherweight	Manuel Bilić	def.	Dragan Pešić	TKO (Punches)	1	4:35	Bilić replaced Darko Banović.
Catchweight -82 kg	Kristijan Perak	def.	Aurel Pirtea	TKO (Punches)	1	2:21	Pirtea replaced injured Dominic Schober.
FFC 16 Kickboxing
Welterweight	Shkodran Veseli	def.	Duoli Chen	Decision (Unanimous)	3	3:00	Originally for the Vacant FFC Kickboxing Welterweight Championship between Veseli and Paul Daley.
Catchweight (72.5 kg)	Fadi Merza	def.	Gianfranco Capurso	KO	1	1:45	Merza's retiring fight.
Heavyweight	Dževad Poturak	def.	Theodosiadis Panagiotis	Decision (Unanimous)	3	3:00
Welterweight	Manuel Sembera	vs.	TBA				Canceled.
Welterweight	Grigor Ashughbabyan	def.	Stevan Živković	Decision (Unanimous)	3	3:00	Živković was counted in round 3.
Lightweight	Aziz Kallah	def.	Lirim Ahmeti	Decision (Unanimous)	3	3:00	Ahmeti replaced Gabriel Bozan.
Catchweight (67.5 kg)	Ivan Zidar	def.	Alin Span	Decision (Unanimous)	3	3:00
Boxing superfight
Lightweight	Nicole Wesner	def.	Gina Chamie	KO	3		Vacant WIBF Women's International Boxing Federation World lightweight title. Vacant World Boxing Federation female lightweight title

==== FFC 17 Futures Super Finals ====
FFC 17 Futures Super Finals
- Promotion: Final Fight Championship
- Date: 20 December 2014
- Venue: Marino Cvetković Sports Hall
- City: Opatija, Croatia

FFC 17: Futures Super Finals was a mixed martial arts and kickboxing event produced by the Final Fight Championship that was held on 20 December 2014 at Marino Cvetković Sports Hall in Opatija, Croatia.

The event served as the end-of-the-year finale of the FFC Futures series – a series of kickboxing and MMA tournaments for younger, aspiring fighters. The winners of the tournament signed a deal with the promotion.

The event also featured two kickboxing super fights. Mladen Brestovac defeated Wiesław Kwaśniewski thus winning the FFC inaugural kickboxing heavyweight title. Local kickboxing favorite Ivan Stanić defeated Bahrudin Mahmić.

In the MMA super fight Dion Staring defeated former UFC heavyweight champion Ricco Rodriguez and won the FFC's inaugural heavyweight MMA title.

Results

MMA Super Fights
Weight Class				Method	Round	Time	Notes
Heavyweight	Dion Staring	def.	Ricco Rodriguez	Submission (verbal submission)	2	5:00	For the FFC MMA Heavyweight Championship.
Heavyweight	Dorijan Ilić	def.	Peter Rozmaring	TKO (punches)	1	0:58
MMA Finals
Heavyweight +93 kg	Jani Istvan	def.	Nikola Janić	TKO	1	2:57
Light Heavyweight -93 kg	Martin Batur	def.	Strahinja Denić	Submission (arm triangle choke)	2	2:59
Middleweight -84 kg	Bruno Guštović	def.	Tomislav Burec	Submission (guillotine choke)	1	0:36
Welterweight -77 kg	Vladimir Prodanović	def.	Marko Ostanek	Submission (RNC)	1	4:28
Lightweight -70 kg	Tilen Kolarič	def.	Hrvoje Stepić	Submission (RNC)	1	4:25
Kickboxing Super Fights
Heavyweight	Mladen Brestovac	def.	Wiesław Kwaśniewski	TKO (punches)	2	0:45	For FFC Heavyweight Championship.
-91 kg	Bahrudin Mahmić	def.	Ivan Stanić	Decision (unanimous)	3	3:00	Mahmić is late replacement for Tamás Lénárt.
Kickboxing Finals
Light Heavyweight -91 kg	Antonio Plazibat	def.	Mitar Dugalić	KO (punch)	3	0:44
Middleweight -85 kg	Nikita Chub	def.	Ivica Čuklin	Decision (unanimous)	3	3:00
Welterweight -77 kg	Jasmin Bajrović	def.	Marko Dragović	TKO (punches)	1	1:31
Lightweight -70 kg	Valentin Rybalko	def.	Marko Adamović	Decision (unanimous)	3	3:00
MMA Semifinals
MMA HW	Jani Istvan	def.	Fahrudin Ferizović	TKO	1	1:34
MMA HW	Nikola Janjić	def.	Jasmin Begisholli	TKO	1	3:16
MMA -93 kg	Martin Batur	def.	Ivica Tadijanov	Decision (Unanimous)	2	5:00
MMA -93 kg	Strahinja Denić	vs.	Godrian Schober	Walk Over			Schober didn't show, Denic advances to the final.
MMA −84 kg	Tomislav Burec	def.	Plejurat Smajli	Submission (Rear Naked Choke)	1	1:46
MMA −84 kg	Bruno Guštović	def.	Ivica Čubić	Submission (Armbar)	1	4:45
MMA -77 kg	Saša Drobac	def.	Tadija Majić	TKO (Doctor Stoppage)	2	2:32
MMA -77 kg	Vladimir Prodanović	def.	Marko Ostanek	Submission (Armbar)	1	2:57
MMA -70 kg	Hrvoje Stepić	def.	Jasmin Ilijaš	Submission (Triangle Choke)	1	0:36
MMA -70 kg	Tilen Kolarič	def.	Aleksandar Rakas	Submission (Rear Naked Choke)	1	3:18
Kickboxing Semifinals
KB HW	Dino Belošević	def.	Nato Cvitan	Decision (Unanimous)		2:00
KB HW	Tomislav Čikotić	def.	Oleksandr Bodruhkin	Decision (Unanimous)		2:00
KB -91	Antonio Plazibat	def.	Stipe Stipetić	TKO	2	1:42
KB -91	Mitar Dugalić	def.	Nenad Ćosić	Decision (Unanimous)		2:00
KB -85 kg	Ivica Čuklin	def.	Milan Filipović	Decision (Split)		2:00
KB -85 kg	Nikita Chub	vs.	Matijas Barić	Walk Over			Barić didn't show, Chub advances to the final.
KB -77 kg	Jasmin Bajrović	def.	Toni Mikelić	Decision (Unanimous)		2:00
KB -77 kg	Marko Dragović	def.	Deszo Bakacs	Decision (Split)		2:00
KB -70 kg	Marko Adamović	def.	Finko Barišić	Decision (Unanimous)		2:00
KB -70 kg	Valentin Rybalko	def.	Manuel Smoljan	Decision (Split)		2:00

==== FFC 18: Pokrajac vs. Taxiarchis ====
FFC 18: Pokrajac vs. Taxiarchis
- Promotion: Final Fight Championship
- Date: 17 April 2015
- Venue: Arena Stožice
- City: Ljubljana, Slovenia

FFC 18: Pokrajac vs. Taxiarchis was a mixed martial arts and kickboxing event produced by the Final Fight Championship that was held on 17 April 2015 at Arena Stožice in Ljubljana, Slovenia.

After holding three previous events in Ljubljana, Slovenia, the event was the first that the organization has hosted at Arena Stožice.

The MMA part of the event was headlined by a heavyweight bout between former UFC fighter Igor Pokrajac and Archontis Taxiarchis. Igor Pokrajac made successful FFC debut defeating Taxiarchis vis first-round KO.

In the MMA co-main event Laszlo Senyei and Tonči Peruško fought in a welterweight contender bout. Senyei won via first-round RNC and secured his #1 position as a contender.

Filip Pejić and Slobodan Maksimović fought for the lightweight contender position but the bout was ruled out as No Contest.

The kickboxing part of the event was headlined by a title bout between FFC lightweight champion Samo Petje and Valentin Rybalko. Petje successfully defended his title.

In the kickboxing co-main event Mladen Brestovac defended his FFC heavyweight title against Colin George.

Results

FFC 18 MMA
Weight Class				Method	Round	Time	Notes
Heavyweight	Igor Pokrajac	def.	Archontis Taxiarchis	KO (punches)	1	3:03
Welterweight	Laszlo Senyei	def.	Tonči Peruško	Submission (RNC)	1	4:00
Featherweight	Filip Pejić	vs.	Slobodan Maksimović	Draw	3	5:00
Welterweight	Ivan Gluhak	def.	Dušan Džakić	KO (punch)	1	4:12
Welterweight	Ivica Trušček	def.	Laszlo Soltesz	TKO (punches)	1	2:57
Lightweight	Danilo Belluardo	def.	Tilen Kolarič	KO (soccer kick)	1	2:03
FFC 18 Kickboxing
Lightweight	Samo Petje	def.	Valentin Rybalko	TKO (high kick)	3	0:33	For the FFC Kickboxing Lightweight Championship.
Heavyweight	Mladen Brestovac	def.	Colin George	TKO (injury)	1	0:27	For the FFC Kickboxing Heavyweight Championship
Middleweight	Miran Fabjan	def.	Denis Marjanović	Decision (majority)	3	3:00
Light heavyweight	Vasil Ducar	def.	Denis Chorchyp	KO (punch)	3	2:31
Lightweight	Teo Mikelić	def.	Fabio Di Marco	Decision (majority)	4	3:00
Welterweight	Eyevan Danenberg	def.	Jasmin Bajrović	KO (liver kick)	4	0:27

==== FFC 19: Sakara vs. Akil ====
FFC 19: Sakara vs. Akil
- Promotion: Final Fight Championship
- Date: 18 September 2015
- Venue: TipsArena Linz
- City: Linz, Austria

FFC 19: Sakara vs. Akil was a mixed martial arts and kickboxing event produced by the Final Fight Championship that was held on 18 September 2015 at TipsArena Linz in Linz, Austria.

This event marked the first time that the FFC hosted an event in Linz, Austria.

The fight card featured Italian MMA fighter Alessio Sakara facing off against Dib Akil in the MMA portion of the event, with Jason Wilnis and David Keclik headlining the kickboxing section.

Alessio Sakara made his return to the ring after a hiatus forced by a bicep rupture he sustained during his match against Poland's Maciej Browarski at FFC 16. In the co-main event of the MMA section, Bosnia's Tomislav Spahović squared off against Gustav Diets in the light heavyweight division. Marcin Prachnio went up against Croatia's wrestler Matej Batinić.

The MMA portion of the event kicked off with a fight in which Darko Stošić defeated Hatef Moeil.

The main event of the kickboxing segment marked the farewell bout for Austria's David Keclik, who faced off against Glory's Jason Wilnis. In the light heavyweight division, Glory's Antonio Plazibat secured victory over Daniel Škvor.

FFC 19 MMA
Weight Class				Method	Round	Time	Notes
Light Heavyweight	Alessio Sakara	def.	Dib Akil	TKO	1	1:32
Light Heavyweight	Tomislav Spahović	def.	Gustav Dietz	KO	1	2:28
Light Heavyweight	Marcin Prachnio	def.	Matej Batinić	Decision (unanimous)	3	5:00
Featherweight	Lemmy Krušič	def.	Dragan Pešić	TKO (punches)	1	3:12
Featherweight	Manuel Bilić	def.	Risto Dimitrov	TKO (punches)	1	4:02
Lightweight	Danilo Belluardo	def.	Hubert Geven	Decision (unanimous)	3	5:00
Middleweight	Fitim Ukelli	def.	Florian Harringer	Submission (RNC)	1	4:59
Heavyweight	Darko Stošić	def.	Hatef Moeil	TKO (punches)	2	1:17
FFC 19 Kickboxing
Weight Class				Method	Round	Time	Notes
Middleweight	Jason Wilnis	def.	David Keclik	TKO	2	3:00
Middleweight	Stevan Živković	def.	Henry Bannert	TKO	2	2:00
Lightweight	Tigran Movsisyan	def.	Teo Mikelić	KO	3	2:40
Heavyweight	Tomislav Čikotić	def.	Christos Sioulas	TKO (high kick)	1	1:15
Catchweight -81 kg	Marco Pleshberger	def.	Patryk Sztorc	Decision (unanimous)	3	3:00
Light Heavyweight	Antonio Plazibat	def.	Daniel Škvor	TKO	2	2:48
Featherweight	Ivan Zidar	def.	Zekria Resai	Decision (unanimous)	4	3:00

==== FFC 20: Pokrajac vs. Maisuradze ====
FFC 20: Prokajac vs. Maisuradze
- Promotion: Final Fight Championship
- Date: 23 October 2015
- Venue: Dvorana Dražena Petrovića
- City: Zagreb, Croatia

FFC 20: Pokrajac vs. Maisuradze was a mixed martial arts and kickboxing event produced by the Final Fight Championship that was held on 23 October 2015 at Dvorana Dražena Petrovića in Zagreb, Croatia.

With this event, FFC returned to its hometown of Zagreb, Croatia, after three-years. The last event FFC hosted in Zagreb was FFC 8 in 2013.

This event was headlined by former UFC fighter Igor Pokrajac, who faced off against Zauri Maisuradze in the MMA portion of the event.

The MMA co-main event was originally slated to be the FFC lightweight championship bout between FFC champion Viktor Halmi and Ivica Trušček. However, Trušček failed to make weight, and as a result, Halmi accepted a catchweight bout. Unfortunately, due to Trušček's weight issue, this match was not contested as a title bout.

In the main event of the kickboxing segment of the show, Frederic Sinistra emerged victorious by defeating Dževad Poturak in the heavyweight division.

FFC 20 MMA
Weight Class				Method	Round	Time	Notes
Light Heavyweight	Igor Pokrajac	def.	Zauri Maisuradze	Submission (Armbar)	1	1:14
Catchweight	Ivica Trušček	def.	Viktor Halmi	KO (GNP)	1	4:30
Featherweight	Filip Pejić	def.	Zoltan Turai	KO (Soccer kick)	1	0:57
Lightweight	Matej Truhan	def.	Nikola Didov	TKO (punches)	1	0:44
Featherweight	Adam Boricz	def.	Matija Blažičević	Decision (unanimous)	3	5:00
Catchweight	Roberto Soldić	def.	Saša Drobac	Decision (unanimous)	3	5:00
Welterweight	Dušan Džakić	def.	Bojan Kosednar	TKO (doctor stoppage)	2	4:23
FFC 20 Kickboxing
Weight Class				Method	Round	Time	Notes
Heavyweight	Frédéric Sinistra	def.	Dževad Poturak	Decision (unanimous)	3	5:00
Middleweight	Mykyta Chub	def.	Denis Marjanovic	Decision (unanimous)	3	5:00
Heavyweight	Colin George	def.	Elmir Mehić	Decision (unanimous)	5	5:00
Welterweight	Jasmin Bajrović	def.	Jasko Memišević	TKO (punch)	1	2:28
Middleweight	Andi Vrtačić	def.	Boban Krušić	Decision (unanimous)	3	3:00
Lightweight	Nikola Cimeša	def.	Adam Gaal	Decision (unanimous)	3	3:00

==== FFC 21: Staring vs. Kraniotakes ====
FFC 21: Staring vs. Kraniotakes
- Promotion: Final Fight Championship
- Date: 27 November 2015
- Venue: Športska dvorana Zamet
- City: Rijeka, Croatia

FFC 21: Staring vs. Kraniotakes was a mixed martial arts and kickboxing event produced by the Final Fight Championship that was held on 27 November 2015 in Rijeka, Croatia.

The event marked the promotion's inaugural hosting in Rijeka, Croatia. FFC 21 showcased three title bouts.

In the main event of the MMA portion, FFC heavyweight champion Dion Staring faced off against Germany's Andreas Kraniotakes, who aimed to capture the championship. This marked Dion Staring's first title defense since his victory over Ricco Rodriguez at FFC 17: Futures Super Finals, where he claimed the inaugural heavyweight title.

In the co-main event, Tomislav Spahović and Poland's Marcin Prachnio competed for the FFC's inaugural light heavyweight title, with Prachnio emerging as the victor.

Another title bout occurred in the kickboxing segment of the event, where Slovenia's Samo Petje successfully defended his title against Tigran Movsisyan.

FFC 21 MMA
Weight Class				Method	Round	Time	Notes
Heavyweight	Dion Staring	def.	Andreas Kraniotakes	Decision (Unanimous)	3	3:00
Light Heavyweight	Marcin Prachnio	def.	Tomislav Spahović	TKO (Punch)	1	3:22
Featherweight	Slobodan Maksimović	def.	Lemmy Krušić	Decision (Unanimous)	3	3:00
Heavyweight	Darko Stošić	def.	Ivan Vitasović	Submission (Keylock)	1	2:59
Middleweight	David Vasić	def.	Daniel Iliev	TKO (Punches)	1	3:22
Middleweight	Balazs Kiss	def.	Bruno Guštović	Submission (RNC)	1	5:00
Welterweight	Ivica Trušček	def.	Vladislav Kanchev	TKO (Punches)	2	2:15
FFC 21 Kickboxing
Weight Class				Method	Round	Time	Notes
Light Heavyweight	Mladen Kujudžić	def.	Frank Munoz	TKO (Highkick)	2	2:43
Lightweight	Samo Petje	def.	Tigran Movsisyan	Decision (Unanimous)	3	3:00
Middleweight	Igor Emkić	def.	Toni Mikelić	TKO	3	2:05
Welterweight	Eyevan Danenberg	def.	Stevan Živković	Decision (Unanimous)	3	3:00
Light Heavyweight	Strahinja Denić	def.	Denis Chorchyp	TKO (punches)	1	1:21
Lightweight	Nikola Cimeša	def.	Fabio di Marco	Decision (unanimous)	3	3:00

==== FFC 22: Van Roosmalen vs. Michailidis ====
FFC 22: Van Roosmalen vs. Michailidis
- Promotion: Final Fight Championship
- Date: 19 February 2016
- Venue: Faliro Olympic Stadium
- City: Athens, Greece

FFC 22: Van Roosmalen vs. Michailidis was a mixed martial arts and kickboxing event produced by the Final Fight Championship that was held on 19 February 2016 at Faliro Olympic Stadium in Athens, Greece.

The event marked the first occasion that the promotion had hosted an event in Athens, Greece.

The MMA card featured a featherweight bout in the headline match, pitting former Glory featherweight and lightweight champion Robin van Roosmalen against Athinodoros Michailidis. Notably, this fight marked Van Roosmalen's MMA debut.

The kickboxing section was led by a light heavyweight title bout between Pavel Zhuravlev and Brian Douwes. Igor Jurković, the former FFC light heavyweight champion, had held the title for several years but retired, leaving the spot vacant.

In another title bout within the kickboxing lightweight division, the reigning champion Samo Petje faced off against Meletis Kakoubavas. Samo Petje suffered a brutal knockout in the second round, resulting in Kakoubavas becoming the new champion.

FFC Futures champion and Glory kickboxer Antonio Plazibat experienced his first career defeat in a match against Sergej Maslobojev.

Another FFC Futures champion, Jasmin Bajrović, was knocked out in a welterweight bout against Dimitris Chiotis.

FFC 22 MMA
Weight Class				Method	Round	Time	Notes
Featherweight	Robin van Roosmalen	def.	Athinodoros Michailidis	TKO (Punches)	2	2:21
Catchweight	Pavel Doroftei	def.	Alex Kalergis	TKO (Punch)	1	1:20
Middleweight	Zauri Maisuradze	def.	David Vasić	Submission (Armbar)	1	4:17
Lightweight	Alexandros Papadimitrou	def.	Vladislav Genov	KO (GNP)	1	2:23
Welterweight	John Palaiologos	def.	Alexandros Dimaras	TKO (Punches)	1	4:35
FFC 22 Kickboxing
Weight Class				Method	Round	Time	Notes
Light Heavyweight	Pavel Zhuravlev	def.	Brian Douwes	TKO (Punch)	3	1:20
Lightweight	Meletis Kakoubavas	def.	Samo Petje	KO (Punch)	2	0:54
Heavyweight	Sebastian Cozmanca	def.	Tomislav Čikotić	Decision (Split)	3	3:00
Lightweight	Florian Marku	def.	Marko Adamović	Decision (Unanimous)	3	3:00
Light Heavyweight	Sergej Maslobojev	def.	Antonio Plazibat	TKO (Doctor stoppage)	2	3:00
Welterweight	Dimitrios Chiotis	def.	Jasmin Bajrović	TKO (Punches)	2	1:20

==== FFC 23: Sadeghi vs. Movsisyan ====
FFC 23: Sadeghi vs. Movsisyan
- Promotion: Final Fight Championship
- Date: 18 March 2016
- Venue: Multiversum Schwechat
- City: Vienna, Austria

FFC 23: Sadeghi vs. Movsisyan was a mixed martial arts and kickboxing event produced by the Final Fight Championship that was held on 18 March 2016 in Vienna, Austria.

In the main MMA fight of the event, Austria's Philipp Schranz faced off against the UK's James Brum in featherweight division.

In the co-main event, there was a title match in the featherweight division, where Ahmed Vila competed against FFC champion Viktor Halmi, who lost his belt to the Bosnian fighter.

Another title bout showcased Laszlo Senyei against Ivan Gluhak. Senyei secured victory by submitting his opponent with a triangle choke, earning the inaugural welterweight belt.

In the kickboxing segment of the event, FFC welterweight champion Shkodran Veseli was originally scheduled to defend his title against Eyevan Danenberg. Unfortunately, Veseli had to withdraw, leading to Danenberg facing Ayub Gaziev, whom he defeated via TKO.

FFC 23 MMA
Weight Class				Method	Round	Time	Notes
Featherweight	James Brum	def.	Philipp Schranz	Decision (Unanimous)	3	5:00
Featherweight	Ahmed Vila	def.	Viktor Halmi	Decision (Unanimous)	3	5:00
Welterweight	Laszlo Senyei	def.	Ivan Gluhak	Submission (Trinagle choke)	3	3:38
Featherweight	Joey Kuiten	def.	Darko Banović	TKO (Punches)	1	3:25
Featherweight	Adam Borics	def.	Manuel Bilić	Submission (Triangle choke)	2	3:32
FFC 23 Kickboxing
Weight Class				Method	Round	Time	Notes
Lightweight	Tigran Movsisyan	def.	Foad Sadeghi	Decision (Unanimous)	3	3:00
Welterweight	Eyevan Danenberg	def.	Ayub Gaziev	TKO (Liver kick)	2	1:15
Lightweight	Doah Devon	def.	Beko Djoinashvili	TKO (Injury)	1	3:00
Welterweight	Jasmin Bajrović	def.	Manuel Sembera	TKO (Kick)	2	0:56
Middleweight	Karim Mabrouk	def.	Aleksander Stankov	Decision (Majority)	3	3:00
Catchweight	Vahid Ipek	def.	Mark Kurick	TKO (Liver kick)	2	1:49

==== FFC 24: Villefort vs. Rela ====
FFC 24: Villefort vs. Rela
- Promotion: Final Fight Championship
- Date: 4 June 2016
- Venue: Ocean Center
- City: (United States) Daytona Beach, Florida

FFC 24: Villefort vs. Rela was a mixed martial arts and kickboxing event produced by the Final Fight Championship that was held on 4 June 2016 in Daytona Beach, FL, United States.

The event marked the inaugural occasion that the promotion hosted in the United States.

The MMA segment of the event showcased both American and Brazilian fighters, all of whom were making their debuts in the FFC. The headline bout featured Thiago Rela and former UFC fighter Danillo Villefort.

In the co-main MMA bout, Roberto Neves squared off against Valdir Araujo in the catchweight division.

On the kickboxing portion of the card, the event included the participation of several European fighters, including Mladen Brestovac and Tigran Movsisyan.

In the main event, Mladen Brestovac returned to the ring following a previous loss to Rico Verhoeven in a title fight at Glory 28 Paris. His opponent at FFC 24 was Steven Banks.

FFC 24 MMA
Weight Class				Method	Round	Time	Notes
Middleweight	Danillo Villefort	def.	Thiago Rela	TKO (Punches)	3	1:04
Catchweight	Roberto Neves	def.	Valdir Araujo	KO (Head kick)	1	1:23
Light Heavyweight	Jeremy Kimball	def.	Matt Van Buren	KO (Punches)	1	0:14
Lightweight	Desmond Green	def.	Desmond Hill	Decision (Unanimous)	3	5:00
Catchweight	Chris Curtis	def.	Leo Bercier	Decision (Unanimous)	3	5:00
Welterweight	Arda Adas	def.	Jorge Luis Bezera	TKO (Punches)	2	1:31
FFC 24 Kickboxing
Weight Class				Method	Round	Time	Notes
Heavyweight	Mladen Brestovac	def.	Steven Banks	TKO (High kick)	2	2:42
Lightweight	Tigran Movsisyan	def.	Jovan Davis	Decision (Unanimous)	3	3:00
Lightweight	Michael Stripling	def.	John Morehouse	Decision (Unanimous)	3	3:00
Welterweight	Michael Stevens	def.	Cyrus Washington	Decision (Unanimous)	3	3:00
Lightweight	Kit Ruddock	def.	Robert Mosier	Decision (Unanimous)	3	3:00

==== FFC 25: Mitchell vs. Lopez ====
FFC 25: Mitchell vs. Lopez
- Promotion: Final Fight Championship
- Date: 11 June 2016
- Venue: MassMutual Center
- City: (United States) Springfield, Massachusetts

FFC 25: Mitchell vs. Lopez was a mixed martial arts and kickboxing event produced by the Final Fight Championship that was held on 11 June 2016 in Springfield, MA, United States.

The event marked the inaugural occasion for the promotion in Springfield, Massachusetts.

Originally, the MMA segment of the event was set to be headlined by Dion Staring and Serbia's Darko Stošić. However, Staring withdrew from the fight due to an injury and was subsequently replaced by Manny Murillo. As a result, this bout assumed the co-main event status.

The primary matchup featured former UFC fighter David Mitchell, who faced off against Dervin Lopez.

Ahmed Vila, the FFC lightweight champion, had initially been slated to compete for the vacated featherweight belt against Adam Borics. However, due to visa issues, this bout had to be canceled.

The lightweight division witnessed a showdown between two former UFC fighters, Leonardo Mafra and Anthony Njokuani.

The kickboxing segment of the event also showcased several European fighters, including Pavel Zhuravlev, Denis Marjanović, and Donegi Abena.

In the main kickboxing bout, former interim Glory light heavyweight champion Pavel Zhuravlev squared off against Benjanin Fuimaono.

In the heavyweight division, a notable victory was achieved by the then 19-year-old Donegi Abena, who secured a TKO victory over Maurice Jackson.

FFC 25 MMA
Weight Class				Method	Round	Time	Notes
Middleweight	David Mitchell	def.	Dervin Lopez	Submission (RNC)	2	1:09
Heavyweight	Darko Stošić	def.	Manny Murillo	TKO (Punches)	1	0:56
Lightweight	Leonardo Mafra	def.	Anthony Njokuani	Decision (Unanimous)	3	5:00
Middleweight	Leonardo Leite	def.	Matt Masterson	TKO	3	1:12
Heavyweight	Tyler East	def.	Dale Sopi	Submission (Kimura)	1	2:30
Featherweight	Matthew Wagy	def.	Paul Webb	TKO (Ground and pound)	1	3:49
FFC 25 Kickboxing
Weight Class				Method	Round	Time	Notes
Light Heavyweight	Pavel Zhuravlev	def.	Benjamin Fuimaono	TKO (Punches)	1	2:15
Middleweight	Denis Marjanović	def.	Youssouf Saidi	Decision (Unanimous)	3	3:00
Heavyweight	Donegi Abena	def.	Maurice Jackson	TKO (Punches)	1	1:10
Middleweight	Chip Moraza-Pollard	def.	Aaron Hamilton	TKO (Low kicks)	2	1:41
Catchweight	Johnny Baldridge	def.	Cleveland Mclean	Decision (Unanimous)	3	3:00

==== FFC 26: Staring vs. Stošić ====
FFC 26: Stošić vs. Staring
- Promotion: Final Fight Championship
- Date: 24 September 2016
- Venue: TipsArena Linz
- City: Linz, Austria

FFC 26: Staring vs. Stošić was a mixed martial arts and kickboxing event produced by the Final Fight Championship that was held on 24 September 2016 in Linz, Austria.

The event marked the promotion's second venture in Linz, Austria.

FFC 26 signified the return of Final Fight Championship to the European scene, commencing with a showdown in Austria.

The MMA segment of the event showcased a headline match in the heavyweight division, pitting FFC champion Dion Staring against Darko Stošić. This bout had initially been scheduled for FFC 25 but was postponed due to Staring's injury.

In the co-main event, FFC lightweight champion Ahmed Vila was granted another opportunity to vie for the featherweight title. Originally, he was slated to compete for the belt at FFC 25, but circumstances forced him to withdraw from the fight due to visa issues. Croatia's Filip Pejić faced Vila at FFC 26 in Linz, ultimately defeating him to secure the FFC featherweight championship.

The MMA section of the event had also planned to feature a bout between former Glory lightweight and featherweight champion Robin Van Roosmalen and Zoltan Turi. However, Van Roosmalen had to withdraw due to a knee injury.

In the kickboxing division's main event, Shkodran Veseli squared off against Eyevan Danenberg. Their clash was originally scheduled for FFC 23 in Vienna but was postponed when Veseli sustained an injury.

Former FFC lightweight champion Samo Petje made a return to the ring after a devastating knockout he suffered in a match against Meletis Kakoubavas at FFC 22 in Athens. He secured a successful comeback victory against Zahid Zairov.

FFC 26 MMA
Weight Class				Method	Round	Time	Notes
Heavyweight	Darko Stošić	def.	Dion Staring	Decision (Unanimous)	3	5:00
Featherweight	Filip Pejić	def.	Ahmed Vila	TKO (GNP)	3	3:40
Catchweight	Abusupiyan Magomedov	def.	Ivica Trušček	Submission (RNC)	2	4:50
Middleweight	Aleksandar Ilić	def.	Florian Harringer	TKO (Walk over)	1	0:00
Featherweight	Arbi Mezhidov	def.	Marko Burušić	Decision (Split)	3	5:00
Catchweight	Ahmed Abdulkadirov	def.	Vasilis Karavasilis	TKO	1	3:46
FFC 26 Kickboxing
Weight Class				Method	Round	Time	Notes
Welterweight	Eyevan Danenberg	def.	Shkodran Veseli	Decision (Unanimous)	3	3:00
Lightweight	Samo Petje	def.	Zahid Zairov	Decision (Unanimous)	3	3:00
Heavyweight	Tomislav Čikotić	def.	Enver Šljivar	Decision (Unanimous)	3	3:00
Welterweight	Ivan Bilić	def.	Kristijan Franjić	KO (Punches)	1	2:25
Middleweight	Rene Wimmer	def.	Cheick Sidibe	TKO (Punch)	3	0:58
Lightweight	Thomas Leitner	def.	Marian Serban	TKO (Punches)	1	2:08

==== FFC 27: Stošić vs. Staring ====
FFC 27: Stošić vs. Staring
- Promotion: Final Fight Championship
- Date: 17 December 2016
- Venue: Arena Zagreb
- City: Zagreb, Croatia

FFC 27: Stošić vs. Staring was a mixed martial arts and kickboxing event produced by the Final Fight Championship that was held on 17 December 2016 in Zagreb, Croatia.

FFC concluded 2016 with an event called the "Night of Champions," featuring a fight card primarily composed of title bouts across various divisions.

In the MMA main event, heavyweight Darko Stošić secured victory against Dion Staring in their rematch, maintaining his championship status. Their initial encounter took place at FFC 26 in Linz, Austria, where Stošić claimed his first win over Staring via unanimous decision. Stošić repeated this success in their rematch, once again winning by unanimous decision.

Filip Pejić defended his featherweight division belt for the first time by defeating James Brum via unanimous decision. Pejić initially won the belt at FFC 26 in a match against Ahmed Vila, marking a successful return after a brief stint in the UFC.

In the MMA co-main event, Croatia's Maro Perak faced off against America's Jeremy Kimball for the light heavyweight title.

Initially slated to fight Pavel Doroftei for the FFC vacant middleweight championship belt, David Mitchell was replaced by Andy Manzolo. Meanwhile, middleweight division champion Laszlo Senyei decided to depart from the division, leaving the spot vacant.

Roberto Soldić emerged victorious in the welterweight title bout against Croatia's Ivica Trušćek.

The vacant lightweight title was contested in a bout between SBG's Luka Jelčić and Italy's Danilo Belluardo, who had maintained an undefeated record in the FFC ring.

In the kickboxing main event, Mladen Brestovac defended his heavyweight title against Daniel Lentie from France, shortly after his impressive victory over Jahfarr Wilnis at GLORY 35 in Nice.

Denis Marjanović and Rene Wimmer competed for the inaugural middleweight belt in an anticipated showdown.

The kickboxing segment of the event commenced with a bout in the lightweight division featuring Samo Petje against Tigran Movsisyan. Meletis Kakoubavas, the reigning champion, was unable to participate due to a bicep injury.

FFC 27 MMA
Weight Class				Method	Round	Time	Notes
Heavyweight	Darko Stošić	def.	Dion Staring	Decision (Unanimous)	3	5:00
Featherweight	Filip Pejić	def.	James Brum	Decision (Unanimous)	3	5:00
Light Heavyweight	Jeremy Kimball	def.	Maro Perak	TKO (GNP)	3	4:25
Middleweight	David Mitchell	def.	Andy Manzolo	Submission (Guillotine Choke)	3	1:23
Welterweight	Roberto Soldić	def.	Ivica Trušček	TKO (High kick and GNP)	1	1:43
Lightweight	Luka Jelčić	def.	Danilo Belluardo	TKO (GNP)	1	1:52
FFC 27 Kickboxing
Weight Class				Method	Round	Time	Notes
Heavyweight	Mladen Brestovac	def.	Daniel Lentie	Decision (Unanimous)	3	3:00
Light Heavyweight	Andi Vrtačić	def.	Clyde Brunswijk	Decision (Unanimous)	3	3:00
Middleweight	Denis Marjanović	def.	Rene Wimmer	Decision (Unanimous)	3	3:00
Welterweight	Ivan Bilić	def.	Giorgi Bazanov	Decision (Unanimous)	3	3:00
Lightweight	Samo Petje	def.	Tigran Movsisyan	Decision (Unanimous)	3	3:00

==== FFC 28: Van Roosmalen vs. Dimitrov ====
FFC 28: Van Roosmalen vs. Dimitrov
- Promotion: Final Fight Championship
- Date: 11 March 2017
- Venue: Faliro Coastal Zone Olympic Complex
- City: Athens, Greece

FFC 28: Van Roosmalen vs. Dimitrov was a mixed martial arts and kickboxing event produced by the Final Fight Championship that was held on 11 March 2017 in Athens, Greece.

The event marked the promotion's second foray into Athens, Greece.

The MMA segment of the event was headlined by FFC featherweight champion Filip Pejić, who faced off against Alexis Savvidis in a catchweight bout.

Robin van Roosmalen, the former Glory Featherweight Champion and former Glory Lightweight Champion, stepped into the MMA ring against Risto Dimitrov and secured victory via TKO in the first round.

FFC heavyweight champion Darko Stošić successfully defended his championship belt again against Emil Zahariev.

In the kickboxing segment, Samo Petje emerged victorious against Meletis Kakoubavas in a catchweight match, while Eyevan Danenberg, a Glory kickboxer, showcased superiority over Ivan Bilić from Croatia in the co-main event.

FFC middleweight champion Denis Marjanović defended his title for the first time against Andi Vrtačić but lost the belt via split decision.

FFC 28 MMA
Weight Class				Method	Round	Time	Notes
Catchweight	Robin Van Roosmalen	def.	Risto Dimitrov	TKO (Punches and kicks)	1	2:56
Heavyweight	Darko Stošić	def.	Emil Zahariev	TKO (Low kicks)	1	2:05
Catchweight	Filip Pejić	vs.	Alexis Savvidis	Draw	3	5:00
Middleweight	Andreas Michailidis	def.	Borce Talevski	Submission (Verbal submission)	1	1:25
Middleweight	Stamatis Moroulis	def.	Edgar Santos	TKO (GNP)	2	1:59
Lightweight	Giannis Michalopoulos	def.	Alexandros Papadimitrou	Decision (Unanimous)	3	5:00
FFC 28 Kickboxing
Weight Class				Method	Round	Time	Notes
Catchweight	Samo Petje	def.	Meletis Kakoubavas	Decision (Unanimous)	3	3:00
Welterweight	Eyevan Danenberg	def.	Ivan Bilić	KO (Liver kick)	4	1:45
Middleweight	Andi Vrtačić	def.	Denis Marjanović	Decision (Split)	4	3:00
Heavyweight	Stavros Grigorakakis	def.	Tomislav Čikotić	Decision (Unanimous)	4	3:00
Middleweight	Giannis Fezoulai	def.	Marios Blanas	KO (Punch)	1	2:58
Featherweight	Zahid Zairov	def.	Nikos Hisen	Decision (Unanimous)	3	3:00

==== FFC 29: Petje vs. Danenberg ====
FFC 29: Petje vs. Danenberg
- Promotion: Final Fight Championship
- Date: 22 April 2017
- Venue: Tivoli Hall
- City: Ljubljana, Slovenia

FFC 29: Petje vs. Danenberg was a mixed martial arts and kickboxing event produced by the Final Fight Championship that was held on 22 April 2017 in Ljubljana, Slovenia.

The event marked the fifth occasion of the promotion being hosted in Ljubljana, Slovenia, and the second instance to include a boxing match post FFC 16 in Vienna, Austria.

Croatian boxer and former Olympian Hrvoje Sep made his professional boxing debut at FFC 29 against Serbia's Siniša Kondić in the light heavyweight division. This anticipated debut was announced by Sep immediately after the Olympic Games in Rio de Janeiro in 2016.

The MMA segment of the event was headlined by FFC lightweight champion Luka Jelčić, defending his belt against Roberto Pastuch. Originally, Valeriou Mirce was scheduled as his opponent, but due to an injury, Mirce was unable to compete on the night of the event.

In the main event of the kickboxing section, former FFC champion Samo Petje moved up a division and secured victory over Glory's Eyevan Danenberg in the welterweight division via a unanimous decision.

Furthermore, FFC heavyweight champion and Glory kickboxer Mladen Brestovac emerged victorious in the co-main event against Dževad Poturak.

FFC 29 MMA
Weight Class				Method	Round	Time	Notes
Lightweight	Luka Jelčić	def.	Roberto Pastuch	KO (Elbows)	1	1:15
Catchweight	Abusupiyan Magomedov	def.	Sergio Souza	Submission (Standing guillotine)	1	1:30
Featherweight	Ahmed Vila	def.	Tilen Kolarič	Submission (Trinagle choke)	1	2:41
Light Heavyweight	Ivan Erslan	def.	Ivica Tadijanov	Decision (Split)	3	5:00
Catchweight	Marko Ostanek	def.	Jasmin Memović	Decision (Unanimous)	3	5:00
FFC 29 Kickboxing
Weight Class				Method	Round	Time	Notes
Welterweight	Samo Petje	def.	Eyevan Danenberg	Decision (Unanimous)	3	3:00
Heavyweight	Mladen Brestovac	def.	Dževad Poturak	Decision (Unanimous)	3	3:00
Heavyweight	Donegi Abena	def.	Fabien Fouquet	TKO (Liver shot)	1	2:35
Middleweight	Aleksander Stankov	def.	Rene Wimmer	KO (Liver kick)	3	0:42
Middleweight	Mensur Murić	def.	Ivan Šakić	Decision (Unanimous)	3	3:00
Middleweight	Toni Mikelić	def.	Labinot Zekaj	Decision (Unanimous)	3	3:00

==== FFC 30: Ishii vs. Schmiedeberg ====
FFC 30: Ishii vs. Schmiedeberg
- Promotion: Final Fight Championship
- Date: 21 October 2017
- Venue: TipsArena Linz
- City: Linz, Austria

FFC 30: Ishii vs. Schmiedeberg was a mixed martial arts and kickboxing event produced by the Final Fight Championship that was held on 21 October 2017 in Linz, Austria.

FFC 30 MMA
Weight Class				Method	Round	Time	Notes
Heavyweight	Satoshi Ishii	def.	Bjoern Schmiedeberg	Submission (Kimura)	1	2:56
Featherweight	Filip Pejić	def.	Fabiano Silva	TKO	2	4:05
Heavyweight	Ivan Vitasović	def.	Masoud Ranjbar	TKO	2	3:00
Catchweight	Duško Todorović	def.	Alexander Poppeck	Submission	2	1:25
Bantamweight	Stipe Brčić	def.	Davor matić	Submission	1	1:59
Catchweight	Luka Čurković	def.	Selim Topuz	Submission	2	4:15
FFC 30 Kickboxing
Weight Class				Method	Round	Time	Notes
Welterweight	Shkodran Veseli	def.	Dimitrios Chiotis	TKO	2	2:36
Catchweight	Samo Petje	def.	Eduard Chelariu	Decision (Unanimous)	3	3:00
Middleweight	Rene Wimmer	def.	Budimir Bajbić	TKO	1	2:00
Catchweight	Meletis Kakoubavas	def.	Giorgi Bazanov	TKO	3	2:37
Lightweight	Teo Mikelić	def.	Thomas Leitner	Decision (Unanimous)	3	3:00
Welterweight	Markus Ehrenhofer	def.	Benjamin Masudi	Decision (Unanimous)	3	3:00

==== FFC 31: Neves vs. Egli ====
FFC 31: Neves vs. Egli
- Promotion: Final Fight Championship
- Date: 12 October 2018
- Venue: Fight Dome
- City: (United States) Las Vegas, Nevada

FFC 31: Neves vs. Egli was a mixed martial arts and kickboxing event produced by the Final Fight Championship that was held on 12 October 2018 in Las Vegas, Nevada, United States.

The event known as 'The Night of Championship' showcased a series of matchups across various divisions and disciplines. The highlight featured a showdown in the welterweight division between Ben Egli and Roberto Neves, vying for the FFC welterweight title. Ben Egli emerged triumphant, securing the position as the new FFC welterweight champion.

In the kickboxing segment of the event, Glory veteran Francois Ambang faced off against Albanian contender Shkodran Veseli in a battle for the FFC welterweight title. Meanwhile, FFC heavyweight champion Mladen Brestovac, representing Croatia, took on Brazil's Jhonata Diniz. Brestovac successfully defended the FFC heavyweight kickboxing title, delivering a decisive knockout victory over Diniz in the third round.

The boxing category witnessed Dennis Morris and Shawn Miller contending for the WBU cruiserweight title. Notably, Morris stepped in for Marquice Weston, originally slated to face Miller on 28 September. Following a ten-round bout, Shawn Miller emerged victorious via unanimous decision, claiming the WBU Cruiserweight title.

FFC 31 MMA
Weight Class				Method	Round	Time	Notes
Welterweight	Ben Egli	def.	Roberto Neves	Submission (RNC)	1	3:21
FFC 31 Kickboxing
Weight Class				Method	Round	Time	Notes
Welterweight	Shkodran Veseli	def.	Francois Ambang	KO (Punches)	4	1:23
Heavyweight	Mladen Brestovac	def.	Jhonata Diniz	KO (High kick)	3	2:00
Welterweight	Sherrard Blackedge	def.	Jordan Christensen	Decision (unanimous)	3	3:00
FFC 31 Boxing
Cruiserweight	Shawn Miller	def.	Dennis Morris	Decision (Unanimous)	10	3:00

==== FFC 32: Graves vs. Seumanutafa ====
FFC 32: Graves vs. Seumanutafa
- Promotion: Final Fight Championship
- Date: 19 October 2018
- Venue: Fight Dome
- City: (United States) Las Vegas, Nevada

FFC 32: Graves vs. Seumanutafa was a mixed martial arts and kickboxing event produced by the Final Fight Championship that was held on 19 October 2018 in Las Vegas, Nevada, United States.

In the headline bout, Shelton Graves and Carl Seumanutafa, hailing from Samoa, clashed for the FFC heavyweight belt. Graves clinched victory and claimed the championship following an encounter with former Bellator contender Seumanutafa, culminating in Graves being crowned as the new FFC heavyweight champion.

In the co-main event, lightweight contender Brandon Ricetti secured a triumph by submitting Adam Smith via an arm triangle during the opening round.

Representing Croatia as the sole European competitor on the fight card, light heavyweight contender Ivan Erslan faced Branko Busick in a highly bout that concluded with a decisive knockout, marking Erslan's inaugural defeat in his professional career.

Within the welterweight division, Brazil's Edmilson Freitas engaged in a matchup against Contender Series participant Austin Vanderford.

FFC 32 MMA
Weight Class				Method	Round	Time	Notes
Heavyweight	Shelton Graves	def.	Carl Seumanutafa	Decision	5	5:00
Lightweight	Brandon Ricetti	def.	Adam Smith	Submission (Arm triangle)	1	4:26
Light Heavyweight	Branko Busick	def.	Ivan Erslan	KO	2	4:41	Later declared a No Contest
Welterweight	Austin Vanderford	def.	Edmilson Freitas	Submission	1	1:38

==== FFC 33: Chub vs. Vrtačić ====
FFC 33: Chub vs. Vrtačić
- Promotion: Final Fight Championship
- Date: 3 November 2018
- Venue: Fight Dome
- City: (United States) Las Vegas, Nevada

FFC 33: Chub vs. Vrtačić was a mixed martial arts, kickboxing and boxing event produced by the Final Fight Championship that was held on 3 November 2018 in Las Vegas, Nevada, United States.

The event showcased a kickboxing showdown between European contenders, Mykyta Chub of Ukraine and Andi Vrtačić from Croatia, contending for the FFC Middleweight title. Chub secured victory against the previously undefeated FFC champion, Vrtaćić, thereby claiming the middleweight kickboxing championship.

Additionally, the co-main event highlighted an MMA lightweight clash featuring Darrick Minner and former UFC competitor Clay Collard. Minner executed a rear naked choke on Collard within a mere 31 seconds of the first round, culminating in a swift victory.

Another kickboxing match transpired between Chris McMillan of Canada and Teo Mikelić of Croatia, both competing in the lightweight division.

In the realm of boxing, Andre Keys triumphed over Randy Fuentes in the super welterweight division after a six-round contest.

FFC 33 MMA
Weight Class				Method	Round	Time	Notes
Lightweight	Darrick Minner	def.	Clay Collard	Submission (RNC)	1	0:31
FFC 33 Kickboxing
Weight Class				Method	Round	Time	Notes
Middleweight	Mykyta Chub	def.	Andi Vrtačić	Decision (Split)	5	3:00
Lightweight	Chris McMillan	def.	Teo Mikelić	Decision (Split)	3	3:00
Welterweight	Sherrard Blackedge	def.	Jordan Christensen	Decision (unanimous)	3	3:00
FFC 33 Boxing
Super Welterweight	Andre Keys	def.	Randy Fuentes	Decision (Split)	6	3:00

==== FFC 34: Petje vs. Gazani ====
FFC 34: Petje vs. Gazani
- Promotion: Final Fight Championship
- Date: 17 November 2018
- Venue: Fight Dome
- City: (United States) Las Vegas, Nevada

FFC 34: Petje vs. Gazani was a mixed martial arts, kickboxing and boxing event produced by the Final Fight Championship that was held on 17 November 2018 in Las Vegas, Nevada, United States.

Originally slated for 9 November, FFC 34 was set to feature a featherweight title bout between FFC champion Filip Pejić and Brendo Bispo De Sousa. This match would have marked Pejić's fourth title defense since claiming victory in 2016 at FFC 26 against Ahmed Vila. The event faced cancellation due to medical concerns.

Subsequently rescheduled for 16 November, the event's main attraction shifted to a title bout in kickboxing, showcasing Bruno Gazani against Samo Petje, who held the FFC lightweight kickboxing title.

In a kickboxing match, former FFC champion Meletis Kakoubavas secured a victory over Jermaine Soto via a high kick, leading to a TKO in the second round.

In the MMA segment, the evening witnessed DJ Linderman facing off against Tony Johnson in the heavyweight division. Additionally, in another MMA showdown, newcomer Zac Cavender made his professional MMA debut against Marius Cantoneru and emerged victorious with a first-round TKO.

FFC 34 MMA
Weight Class				Method	Round	Time	Notes
Heavyweight	Tony Johnson	def.	DJ Linderman	Decision (Unanimous)	3	5:00
Heavyweight	Zac Cavender	def.	Marius Cantoneru	TKO	1	2:30
FFC 34 Kickboxing
Weight Class				Method	Round	Time	Notes
Lightweight	Samo Petje	vs.	Bruno Gazani	Draw	5	3:00
Lightweight	Meletis Kakoubavas	def.	Jermaine Soto	TKO	2	0:52
FFC 34 Boxing
Super Lightweight	Kevin Johnson	def.	Isaac Luna	Decision	6	3:00

==== FFC 35: Egli vs. Holt ====
FFC 35: Egli vs. Holt
- Promotion: Final Fight Championship
- Date: 19 April 2019
- Venue: Fight Dome
- City: (United States) Las Vegas, Nevada

FFC 35: Egli vs. Holt was a mixed martial arts, kickboxing and boxing event produced by the Final Fight Championship that was held on 19 April 2019 in Las Vegas, Nevada, United States.

FFC 35 MMA
Weight Class				Method	Round	Time	Notes
Welterweight	Ben Egli	def.	Joey Holt	Submission	2	2:25
featherweight	Kyle Reyes	def.	Guilherme Faria	Submission	2	2:00
Lightweight	Clay Collard	def.	Randall Wallace	Decision	3	5:00
FFC 35 Kickboxing
Weight Class				Method	Round	Time	Notes
Middleweight	Adrian Weathersby	def.	Chris Burgett	Decision	3	3:00
FFC 35 Boxing
Welterweight	Kevin Johnson	def.	Larry Gomez	Decision	6	3:00

==== FFC 36: Chub vs. Ambang ====
FFC 36: Chub vs. Ambang
- Promotion: Final Fight Championship
- Date: 10 May 2019
- Venue: Fight Dome
- City: (United States) Las Vegas, Nevada

FFC 36: Chub vs. Ambang was a mixed martial arts and kickboxing event produced by the Final Fight Championship that was held on 10 May 2019 in Las Vegas, Nevada, United States.

FFC 36 MMA
Weight Class				Method	Round	Time	Notes
Catchweight	Tristan Connelly	def.	Zach Juusola	Submission (Guillotine)	1	2:46
Featherweight	Robert Trujillo	def.	David Stieneke	TKO (Punches)	1	4:10
Featherweight	Jordan Leavitt	def.	Ray Ostrander	Submission (Arm Triangle Choke)	1	1:30
Bantamweight	Journey Newson	def.	Soslan Abanokov	KO (Punch)	1	1:20
FFC 36 Kickboxing
Weight Class				Method	Round	Time	Notes
Middleweight	Mykyta Chub	def.	Francois Ambang	Decision	3	3:00

==== FFC 37: Santiago vs. Martinez ====
FFC 37: Santiago vs. Martinez
- Promotion: Final Fight Championship
- Date: 30 May 2019
- Venue: Fight Dome
- City: (United States) Las Vegas, Nevada

FFC 37: Santiago vs. Martinez was a mixed martial arts event produced by the Final Fight Championship that was held on 30 May 2019 in Las Vegas, Nevada, United States.

FFC 37 marked the second FFC event featuring an exclusive MMA card. In the headline bout, Brazil's Anderson Goncalves faced off against Steve Montgomery, who made a comeback to the ring following a two-year break.

Mike Santiago secured a victory over Alonzo Martines, reigniting his winning streak subsequent to losses against opponents like Zabit Magomedsharipov and Dan Ige.

Among the roster, Ivan Erslan, a European contender, underwent preparation for his match with former UFC champion Andrei Arlovski and FFC champion Darko Stosic. Erslan went against Roger Carroll from the USA.

In the opening bout, Jake Albinio, known initially as a wrestler, made a return to the ring after a three-year absence and emerged victorious against Alaska's Kris Berberich.

FFC 37 MMA
Weight Class				Method	Round	Time	Notes
Lightweight	Mike Santiago	def.	Alonzo Martinez	Submission (Guillotine Choke)	2	3:22
Lightweight	Jake Albinio	def.	Kris Berberich	TKO (Strikes)	1	3:39
Light Heavyweight	Ivan Erslan	def.	Roger Carroll	TKO (Strikes)	1	1:37
Middleweight	Anderson Goncalves	def.	Steve Montgomery	TKO (Strikes)	1	1:09

==== FFC 38: Cucciniello vs. Emmers ====
FFC 38: Cucciniello vs. Emmers
- Promotion: Final Fight Championship
- Date: 20 June 2019
- Venue: Fight Dome
- City: (United States) Las Vegas, Nevada

FFC 38: Cucciniello vs. Emmers was a mixed martial arts event produced by the Final Fight Championship that was held on 20 June 2019 in Las Vegas, Nevada, United States.

FFC 38 represented the third event by FFC solely featuring MMA bouts. The main event showcased British featherweight Jay Cucciniello, the runner-up in The Ultimate Fighter 27. Cucciniello returned to the ring after a year since his sole professional career loss, facing off against America's Jamall Emmers.

In a lightweight clash, David Jordan competed against Florida's Caleb Williams from the American Top Team. Both fighters made their promotional debut at FFC 38.

Additionally, Keith Lee, the younger brother of UFC's Kevin Lee, debuted in the FFC bantamweight division against Chris Johnson, who returned to the arena after an eighteen-month hiatus.

FFC 38 MMA
Weight Class				Method	Round	Time	Notes
Featherweight	Jay Cucciniello	def.	Jamal Emmers	TKO	1	4:53
Lightweight	David Jordan	def.	Caleb Williams	KO	1	1:35
Bantamweight	Keith Lee	def.	Chris Johnson	Decision	3	5:00
Lightweight	Max Rohskopf	def.	Jonathon Morris	Submission	1	4:38
Welterweight	Jackie Gosh	def.	Randall Wallace	Submission	1	2:40

==== FFC 39: Jones vs. Powell ====
FFC 39: Jones vs. Powell
- Promotion: Final Fight Championship
- Date: 11 July 2019
- Venue: Fight Dome
- City: (United States) Las Vegas, Nevada

FFC 39: Jones vs. Powell was a mixed martial arts, kickboxing and boxing event produced by the Final Fight Championship that was held on 11 July 2019 in Las Vegas, Nevada, United States.

In the headline fight of the evening, Jamelle Jones, a former participant in both The Ultimate Fighter and Contender Series, made his debut in the promotion and secured a victory over Jordan Powell in the heavyweight division via unanimous decision.

The co-main event witnessed Gabriel Checco emerging victorious over Angel DeAnda in the middleweight division.

During a kickboxing showcase, Argentina's Allan Scheison faced a defeat against Brazil's Wallace Lopes.

In the boxing segment of the event, Dauqan Maya engaged in a clash with Jose Ceja in the welterweight division, maintaining an undefeated record in the ring.

FFC 39 MMA
Weight Class				Method	Round	Time	Notes
Heavyweight	Jamelle Jones	def.	Jordan Powell	Decision (Unanimous)	3	5:00
Middleweight	Gabriel Checco	def.	Angel DeAnda	Punches	1	3:08
Bantamweight	Jerry Shapiro	def.	Josh Wright	TKO (Punches)	1	4:56
Featherweight	Lou Radecki	def.	Justin Vazquz	Submission (Rear Naked Choke)	2	3:08
FFC 39 Kickboxing
Weight Class				Method	Round	Time	Notes
Welterweight	Wallace Lopes	def.	Allan Scheinson	Decision	3	3:00
FFC 39 Boxing
Welterweight	Daquan Mays	def.	Jose Ceja	Decision	4	3:00

==== FFC 40: Egli vs. Lemminger ====
FFC 40: Egli vs. Lemminger
- Promotion: Final Fight Championship
- Date: 5 September 2019
- Venue: Fight Dome
- City: (United States) Las Vegas, Nevada

FFC 40: Egli vs. Lemminger was a mixed martial arts, kickboxing and boxing event produced by the Final Fight Championship that was held on 5 September 2019 in Las Vegas, Nevada, United States.

The event showcased fighters from five different continents and was headlined by a welterweight MMA bout between FFC champion Ben Egli, who lost his title during his second title defense to Mark Lemminger. Egli secured the title in October 2018 after defeating Roberto Neves and successfully defended it for the first time in April 2019 against Joey Holt. Notably, this event marked Lemminger's debut in FFC.

In the co-main event, a kickboxing match for the middleweight title took place. Ukraine's Mykyta Chub defended his title for the second time, facing Brazil's Wellington Alves. Chub's prior title defense saw him triumph over Francois Ambang at FFC 36 in Las Vegas.

The light heavyweight MMA bout witnessed Daniel Jolly and Alex Polizzi finally meeting in the ring after the cancellation of their previous match at FFC 39. While Daniel Jolly has faced MMA artists such as Misha Cirkunov, Khalil Rountree, and Alonzo Menifield, Polizzi maintained his unblemished record of 4-0.

In the lightweight division, the unbeaten Keoni Digs continued his winning streak after facing Bryan Nuro.

Regarding the boxing match, FFC debutant Patrick Mailata, a three-time New Zealand champion and Commonwealth Games bronze medalist, secured victory via KO against Daniel Franco.

FFC 40 MMA
Weight Class				Method	Round	Time	Notes
Welterweight	Mark Lemminger	def.	Ben Egli	Decision (Unanimous)	5	5:00
Welterweight	Jason Witt	def.	Roberto Neves	Decision (Unanimous)	3	5:00
Light Heavyweight	Alex Polizzi	def.	Daniel Jolly	TKO (Punches)	1	4:32
Catchweight	Max Rohskopf	def.	Zach Zane	Submission (Rear-Naked Choke)	1	1:13
Lightweight	Keoni Diggs	def.	Bryan Nuro	Decision (Unanimous)	3	5:00
Welterweight	Jeff Roman	def.	Jamil Ibragimov	Decision (Unanimous)	3	5:00
FFC 40 Kickboxing
Weight Class				Method	Round	Time	Notes
Middleweight	Mykyta Chub	def.	Wellington Alves	KO/TKO (Punch)	4	3:00
FFC 40 Boxing
Heavyweight	Petrick Mailata	def.	Daniel Franco	KO	1	1:04

== Rules ==
The FFC holds fights at its events under the rules of kickboxing and those of mixed martial arts. There is no standardized ratio between kickboxing and MMA fights; it varies from one event to another. The FFC kickboxing rules are the modified rules of the legendary Japanese kickboxing promotion K-1. These include a 10-point must system, three rounds plus one extra round in case of a draw and no clinch allowed. Each round in a kickboxing fight has the duration of three minutes, and intermissions between each round are one minute long.

The FFC's MMA rules are the modified rules of the legendary Japanese MMA promotion Pride. These include a 10-point must system taken from the Unified Rules of MMA, but also allow soccer kicks and stomps, which are excluded from the Unified Rules of MMA. The rules do not allow elbow strikes to the head. Each of the three rounds (there are no extra rounds) last five minutes, and intermissions between each round are one minute long.

The president of the promotion Orsat Zovko stated that the FFC was considering additional innovations in terms of rules to bring the promotion closer to the standards required by public TV networks that broadcast the event live during primetime hours. Specifically, he said that in the future the FFC could exclude techniques that may be considered excessively violent by the mainstream audience, such as soccer kicks and stomps.

== Weight classes and champions ==
The FFC is currently using six weight classes for its MMA fights and five weight classes for its kickboxing fights. Non-title fights have a one-pound leniency.

=== Mixed martial arts ===
Weight class name	Upper limit (lb)	Upper limit (kg)	Current Champion	Title Defenses	Next Fight
Heavyweight	–	–	Shelton Graves @ (FFC 32)	0	—N/a
Light Heavyweight	205	93	Jeremy Kimball @ (FFC 27)	0	—N/a
Middleweight	185	84	David Mitchell @ (FFC 27)	0	—N/a
Welterweight	170	77	Mark Lemminger @ (FFC 40)	0	—N/a
Lightweight	155	70	Luka Jelcic @ (FFC 27)	1	—N/a
Featherweight	145	66	Filip Pejic @ (FFC 26)	2	—N/a

=== Kickboxing ===
Weight class name	Upper limit (lb)	Upper limit (kg)	Current Champion	Title Defenses	Next Fight
Heavyweight	–	–	Mladen Brestovac @ (FFC24)	3	—N/a
Light Heavyweight	209	95	Pavel Zhuravlev @ (FFC27)	0	—N/a
Middleweight	190	86	Mykyta Chub @ (FFC33)	2	—N/a
Welterweight	179	79	Shkodran Veseli @ (FFC31)	0	—N/a
Lightweight	155	70	Samo Petje	0	—N/a
