= Dino Belošević =

Croatian kickboxer

- Born: Dino Belošević; June 5, 1985 (age 41); Omiš, Croatia
- Other names: Omiška stina (Omiš rock)
- Nationality: (Croatia) Croatian
- Height: 1.92 m (6 ft 3 1/2 in)
- Weight: 106 kg (234 lb; 16 st 10 lb)
- Division: Heavyweight
- Style: Kickboxing
- Stance: Orthodox
- Fighting out of: Spalato, Croatia
- Team: Pit Bull
- Trainer: Miro Jurac

Kickboxing record
- Total: 7
- Wins: 5
- Losses: 2
- By knockout: 1

Dino Belosević (born 5 June 1985) is a Croatian kickboxer, W.A.K.O. amateur champion of the world in 2011.

== Biography and career ==
Before kickboxing he played basketball in second Croatian basketball league. Started kickboxing late, at the age of 19, in local gym "Dalmatian power" coached by Vedran Bađun. 2006 moved to "Pit bull" gym coached by Marko Zaja and become full contact Croatian champion 2010 moved from "Pit bull Split" to "Pit bull Zagreb" coached by Miro Jurac. Progressing in "Pit bull Zagreb" and training with coach Miro Jurac he became WAKO Amateur World Champion and multiple Croatian champion in full contact, thai boxing, low kick and K-1 style, also winning "Croatia open" low kick rules tournament.

In 2011 he became W.A.K.O. World, low kick champion, beating Hamza Kendircioglu, runner up from last years European championship and last World championship, Samed Osmanović, champion of Bosnia and Herzegovina in semi finals and winning gold medal against favored Dragan Jovanović from Serbia.

He challenged Freddy Kemayo for the vacant WAKO PRO K1 rules super heavyweight world championship, in Paris, France at FK-ONE event on 20 April 2013, losing by TKO in third round.

He was scheduled to fight Tomáš Hron at Glory 14: Zagreb undercard on 8 March 2014, however he was replaced with Kirk Krouba.

== Titles ==
Professional

- 2014 FFC Futures Tournament Champion +91 kg
- 2014 FFC Futures 2 Tournament Champion +91 kg

Amateur

- 2016 I.F.M.A European Championship 2016 in Maribor, Slovenia (bronze) +91 kg
- 2014 W.A.K.O. European Championships in Bilbao, Spain (bronze) +91 kg
- 2012 W.A.K.O. European Championships in Ankara, Turkey (bronze) +91 kg
- 2012 European Savate Championship (silver) +91 kg
- 2011 W.A.K.O. World Championships 2009 in Skopje, Macedonia (gold) +91 kg

== Kickboxing record ==
Professional kickboxing record
5 wins (0 (T)KOs, 5 decisions), 2 losses
Date	Result	Opponent	Event	Location	Method	Round	Time	Record
2014-12-20	Win	(Croatia) Nato Cvitan	FFC Futures: Super Finale, Semi Finals	Abbazia, Croatia	Decision (unanimous)		2:00	5–2
Wins the FFC Futures Tournament Title +91 kg. Had walktrough in final as Tomislav Čikotić was injured.
2014-05-03	Win	(Croatia) Simon Krizmanić	FFC Futures 2, Final	Abbazia, Croatia	Decision (unanimous)	3	2:00	4–2
Wins FFC Futures 2 Tournament Title +91 kg.
2013-12-13	Loss	(Albania) Rustemi Kreshnik	FFC10: Rodriguez vs. Batzelas	Skopje, Macedonia	Decision (unanimous)	3	3:00	3–2
2013-04-20	Loss	(France) Freddy Kemayo	FK-ONE	Paris, France	TKO (referee stoppage)	3		3–1
For vacant WAKO PRO World K1 Rules Super Heavyweight Championship.
2013-03-23	Win	(Turkey) Ahmet Yildirim	Obračun u Ringu 11	Spalato, Croatia	Decision (unanimous)	3	3:00	3-0
2013-02-23	Win	(Portugal) Luis Morais	SUPERKOMBAT New Heroes 1	Abbazia, Croatia	Decision (unanimous)	3	3:00	2–0
2012-12-15	Win	(France) Geatan Sautron	Croatia Open 2012 - Christmas Cup	Osijek, Croatia	Decision (unanimous)	3	3:00	1–0

Amateur kickboxing record
Date	Result	Opponent	Event	Location	Method	Round	Time
2016-10-27	Loss	(Sweden) Simon Ogolla	2016 IFMA European Championships +91 kg, Semi Finals	Split, Croatia	PTS	3	3:00
Wins the 2016 IFMA European Championships +91 kg Bronze Medal.
2016-10-25	Win	(Hungary) Attila Gilányi	2016 IFMA European Championships +91 kg, Quarter Finals	Split, Croatia	PTS	3	3:00
2014-10-24	Loss	(Russia) Ragim Aliev	W.A.K.O European Championships 2014, Low-Kick Semi Finals +91 kg	Bilbao, Spain	0:3	3	2:00
Wins W.A.K.O. European Championship '14 Low-Kick Bronze Medal +91 kg.
2014-10-23	Win	(Israel) Yosef Tktok	W.A.K.O European Championships 2014, Low-Kick Quarter Finals +91 kg	Bilbao, Spain	3:0	3	2:00
2014-10-21	Win	(Poland) Patrick Prozsek	W.A.K.O European Championships 2014, Low-Kick First Round +91 kg	Bilbao, Spain	PTS	3	2:00
2014-04-12	Win	(Croatia) Nato Cvitan	Croatian Kickboxing Championship, Low-kick Final +91 kg	Poreč, Croatia	3:0	3	2:00
Wins Croatian Kickboxing Championship Low-kick Gold Medal +91 kg.
2014-04-12	Win	(Croatia) Simon Krizmanić	Croatian Kickboxing Championship, Low-kick Semi Finals +91 kg	Poreč, Croatia	3:0	3	2:00
2013-05-18	Loss	(Croatia) Ante Verunica	Croatian Kickboxing Championship, Low-kick Final +91 kg	Šibenik, Croatia	0:3	3	2:00
Wins Croatian Kickboxing Championship Low-kick Silver Medal +91 kg.
2013-05-18	Win	(Croatia) Nato Cvitan	Croatian Kickboxing Championship, Low-kick Semi Finals +91 kg	Šibenik, Croatia	KO	3	2:00
2012-11-02	Loss	(Russia) Ragim Aliev	W.A.K.O European Championships 2012, Low-Kick Semi Finals +91 kg	Ankara, Turkey	2:1	3	2:00
Wins W.A.K.O. European Championship '12 Low-Kick Bronze Medal +91 kg.
2012-10-31	Win	(Turkey) Fatih Cimic	W.A.K.O European Championships 2012, Low-Kick Quarter Finals +91 kg	Ankara, Turkey	TKO	2	
2011-11-02	Win	(Serbia) Dragan Jovanović	W.A.K.O World Championships 2011, Low-Kick Final +91 kg	Skopje, Macedonia	3:0	3	2:00
Wins W.A.K.O. World Championship '12 Low-Kick Gold Medal +91 kg.
2011-10-28	Win	(Bosnia and Herzegovina) Samed Osmanović	W.A.K.O World Championships 2011, Low-Kick Semi Finals +91 kg	Skopje, Macedonia	TKO	2	
2011-10-27	Win	(Turkey) Hamza Kendircioglu	W.A.K.O World Championships 2011, Low-Kick Quarter Finals +91 kg	Skopje, Macedonia	3:0	3	2:00
2008-04-06	Loss	(Croatia) Ante Verunica	Croatian Kickboxing Championship, Low-Kick Final -91 kg	Osijek, Croatia	PTS	3	2:00
Wins Croatian Kickboxing Championship Low-Kick Silver Medal -91 kg.
2008-04-06	Win	(Croatia) N/A	Croatian Kickboxing Championship, Low-Kick Semi Finals -91 kg	Osijek, Croatia			
2008-03-22	Win	(Croatia) Boris Mišković	Croatian Kickboxing Championship, Full-contact Final -91 kg	Split, Croatia	KO		
Wins Croatian Kickboxing Championship Full-Contact Gold Medal -91 kg.
2008-03-22	Win	(Croatia) Antun Batur	Croatian Kickboxing Championship, Full-contact Semi Finals -91 kg	Split, Croatia	PTS	3	2:00
Legend: Win Loss Draw/no contest Notes

== See also ==
- List of WAKO Amateur World Championships
- List of WAKO Amateur European Championships
- List of male kickboxers
