= Shkodran Veseli =

Albanian kickboxer (born 1990)

- Born: December 11, 1990 (age 35); Kosovo
- Other names: Albanian Warrior
- Height: 182 cm (5 ft 11 1/2 in)
- Weight: 77.0 kg (170 lb; 12 st 2 lb)
- Division: Welterweight
- Style: Kickboxing

Kickboxing record
- Total: 85
- Wins: 69
- Losses: 16

Other information
- Boxing record from BoxRec

Shkodran Veseli (born December 11, 1990) is an Albanian kickboxer who competes in the welterweight division. He formerly competed in Superkombat Fighting Championship (SUPERKOMBAT).

== Titles and accomplishments ==
- World Kickboxing and Karate Union
  - 2015 WKU K-1 European Champion
  - 2017 WKU K-1 World Champion
- Final Fight Championship
  - 2018 FFC Welterweight Champion
- World Association of Kickboxing Organizations
  - 2009 WAKO Pro Austrian Champion
- 2013 SPF European Champion

== Fight record ==
Professional Kickboxing Record
69 Wins (41 (T)KO's), 20 Losses, 1 Draw, No Contest
Date	Result	Opponent	Event	Location	Method	Round	Time
2022-09-17	Loss	(Curaçao) Endy Semeleer	Glory Rivals 2	Alkmaar, Netherlands	KO (Right hook)	3	1:05
2022-06-04	Loss	(Netherlands) Marvin Monteirp	Enfusion 107	Darmstadt, Germany	Decision (Unanimous)	3	3:00
2022-03-12	Loss	(Austria) Karim Mabrouk	Tosan Fight	Vienna, Austria	Decision (Unanimous)	5	3:00
For the vacant ISKA World Muay Thai Light Heavyweight (81.5kg) Title.
2019-09-07	Loss	(Netherlands) Regilio Van Den Ent	Enfusion	Darmstadt, Germany	Decision	3	3:00
2019-04-13	Loss	(Azerbaijan) Parviz Abdullayev	Vendetta Champions Night	Istanbul, Turkey	TKO	3	
2018-10-12	Win	(United States) Francois Ambang	FFC 31: Las Vegas	Las Vegas, Nevada, United States	KO (Punches)	4	1:23
Wins FFC Welterweight Title.
2018-4-21	Win	(Germany) Sergej Braun	Enfusion: Dillingen	Dillingen, Germany	TKO (Left hook to the body)	1	
2017-10-21	Win	(Greece) Dimitrios Chiotis	FFC 31: Linz	Linz, Austria	TKO	2	
2017-05-27	Win	(Georgia (country)) Levan Guruli	The Story	Olten, Switzerland	KO	5	
Wins the WKU World -76kg Title.
2017-02-25	Loss	(Portugal) Diogo Calado	Illyrian Fight Night II	Winterthur, Switzerland	Decision (Unanimous)	5	3:00
2016-09-23	Loss	(Netherlands) Eyevan Danenberg	FFC 26: Linz	Linz, Austria	Decision (Unanimous)	3	3:00
2016-04-30	Win	(Slovakia) Jan Mazur	Admiral Dome	Vienna, Austria	Decision	3	3:00
2016-02-27	Win	(Portugal) Fabio Texeira	Illyrian Fight Night	Winterthour, Switzerland	Decision	3	3:00
2015-12-05	Loss	(France) Djibril Ehouo	Swiss Las Vegas Fusion	Spreitenbach, Switzerland	Decision	5	3:00
For the WBC Muay Thai European -76kg Title.
2015-11-07	Win	(Portugal) Adelino Boa Morte	Enfusion Live	Switzerland	Decision	3	3:00
2015-10-03	Win	(Greece) Christos Avramidie	Fight 4 Glory	Biel/Bienne, Switzerland	Decision	3	3:00
2015-06-13	Win	(Romania) Anghel Cardos	Superkombat Special Edition	Spreitenbach, Switzerland	Decision (Unanimous)	3	3:00
2015-05-30	Loss	(Slovakia) Vladimír Moravčík	Full Fight 1 - Slovakia and Czech vs. Russia	Banská Bystrica, Slovakia	Decision (Unanimous)	3	3:00
2015-04-25	Win	(Italy) Francesco Palermo	Swiss Las Vegas: Basel	Basel, Switzerland	Decision (Unanimous)	3	3:00
2015-02-21	Win	(Netherlands) Darryl Sichtman	Gladiators Night	Baden, Switzerland	Decision	3	3:00
Wins WKU K-1 European Title.
2014-12-06	Win	(China) Duoli Chen	FFC 16: Vienna	Vienna, Austria	Decision (Unanimous)	3	3:00
2014-09-13	Draw	(Netherlands) Marco Pique	Gladiators Night	Baden, Switzerland	Decision	3	3:00
2014-06-06	Win	(Slovenia) Vlado Konsky	FFC 13: Zadar	Zadar, Croatia	Decision (Unanimous)	3	3:00
2014-05-10	Win	(Slovakia) Pavol Garaj	Fight Night	Olten, Switzerland	Decision (Unanimous)	3	3:00
2014-04-04	Win	(Serbia) Stefan Živković	FFC 11: Osijek	Osijek, Croatia	KO (Flying Knee)	3	1:14
2014-02-22	Loss	(Netherlands) Marco Pique	Fight Night	Vienna, Austria	Decision (Split)	3	3:00
2013-12-13	Win	(North Macedonia) Ile Risteski	FFC 10: Rodriguez vs. Batzelas	Skopje, Republic of Macedonia	KO (High Kick)	1	1:15
2013-06-01	Win	(France) Hakim Boulman	Art of Fighting: Winterthur	Winterthur, Switzerland	Decision (Unanimous)	3	3:00
Wins SPF European Title.
2013-03-23	Win	(Germany) Alexander Sakotic	Challenger Series: Thailand vs Europe	Neu-Ulm, Germany	Decision	3	3:00
2012-12-08	Loss	(China) Duoli Chen	Vandetta VI: Vienna	Vienna, Austria	TKO	3	3:00
2012-03-06	Win	(Georgia (country)) Giga Chikadze	WFC Challengers 3	Vienna, Austria	KO (Punches)	2	
2011-12-18	Win	(Slovakia) Ongjen Topavolic	WFC 15 Olimp Sport Nutrition	Ljubljana, Slovenia	KO (Punches)	2	
2011-06-12	Loss	(Slovakia) Fabjan Miran	WFC 14	Vienna, Austria	TKO (Doctor stoppage)	4	
2010-11-20	Loss	(Slovakia) Michal Halada	Hanuman Cup 6	Nitra, Slovakia	Decision	5	3:00
2009-09-20	Win	(France) Kuki Stone	Fight Night Super Heroes	Vienna, Austria	TKO		
2009-02-22	Win	(Republic of the Congo) Ndombi Kande	Knock Out Fight-Night	Vienna, Austria			
Wins WAKO Pro Austrian Title.
Legend: Win Loss Draw/No contest Notes
