= W.A.K.O. World Championships (Skopje) 2011 =

Kickboxing event in Macedonia

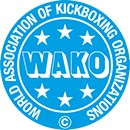
- The poster for W.A.K.O. World Championships (Skopje) 2011
- Promotion: W.A.K.O.
- Date: October 22 to October 29, 2011
- City: Skopje, Macedonia

The WAKO World Championships 2011 for K-1 Rules, Low Kick (LK) and Light Contact (LC) were held in Skopje, Macedonia, from October 22 to October 29, 2011. The event was organized by the World Association of Kickboxing Organizations (WAKO).

== Disciplines ==
=== K-1 Rules ===
A high-intensity full-contact discipline allowing punches, kicks, and knee strikes with limited clinching. It is known for its fast pace and aggressive fighting style.

=== Low Kick (LK) ===
A full-contact style that permits strikes to the head, body, and legs (thighs), emphasizing power, endurance, and tactical kicking.

=== Light Contact (LC) ===
A semi-contact discipline focused on speed, precision, and controlled techniques. Fighters aim to score points with clean, fast strikes rather than heavy impact.

== Light Contact ==
=== Women ===
Event	Gold	Silver	Bronze
LC f -50 kg	Valeria Calabrese; Italy	Valentina Filatova; Russia	Sabina Tagaynazarova; Tajikistan
LC f -50 kg	Valeria Calabrese; Italy	Valentina Filatova; Russia	Monika Markowska; Great Britain
LC f -55 kg	Kateryna Solovey; Ukraine	Ros Wilson; Great Britain	Daniela Rohr; Germany
LC f -55 kg	Kateryna Solovey; Ukraine	Ros Wilson; Great Britain	Sabina Bec; Slovenia
LC f -60 kg	Vivien Wagner; Hungary	Maneka Kissel; Germany	Katarzyna Modrzejewska; Poland
LC f -60 kg	Vivien Wagner; Hungary	Maneka Kissel; Germany	Lilia Sharapova; Russia
LC f -65 kg	Nicole Trimmel; Austria	Ksenia Miroshnichenko; Russia	Martina Marson; Italy
LC f -65 kg	Nicole Trimmel; Austria	Ksenia Miroshnichenko; Russia	Berivan Ay; Turkey
LC f -70 kg	Karin Edenius; Sweden	Ana Znaor; Croatia	Mariya Deloglan; Russia
LC f -70 kg	Karin Edenius; Sweden	Ana Znaor; Croatia	Marta Fenyvesi; Hungary
LC f +70 kg	Maria Semenova; Russia	Anja Renfordt; Germany	Ewa Brodnicka; Poland
LC f +70 kg	Maria Semenova; Russia	Anja Renfordt; Germany	Andreja Ivas; Croatia

=== Men ===
Event	Gold	Silver	Bronze
LC m -57 kg	Dmytro Bezverkhyi; Ukraine	Aleksandr Bakirov; Russia	Fatih Mehmet Sahin; Turkey
LC m -57 kg	Dmytro Bezverkhyi; Ukraine	Aleksandr Bakirov; Russia	Najruz Alibabov; Tajikistan
LC m -63 kg	Darren Chapman; Great Britain	Kostiantin Demoretskyi; Ukraine	Nikolay Kozgov; Russia
LC m -63 kg	Darren Chapman; Great Britain	Kostiantin Demoretskyi; Ukraine	Kian Golpira; Germany
LC m -69 kg	Achmed Nabo; Germany	Marco Perissinotto; Italy	Evgeny Mayer; Russia
LC m -69 kg	Achmed Nabo; Germany	Marco Perissinotto; Italy	Patrick Kalcher; Austria
LC m -74 kg	Laszlo Ando; Hungary	Levente Bertalan; Austria	Jason Godin; France
LC m -74 kg	Laszlo Ando; Hungary	Levente Bertalan; Austria	Stanislav Petrov; Russia
LC m -79 kg	Emanuil Dimitrov; Bulgaria	Georg Parth; Austria	Christian Pohl; Germany
LC m -79 kg	Emanuil Dimitrov; Bulgaria	Georg Parth; Austria	Wilson Campos de Miranda; Brazil
LC m -84 kg	Zoltan Dancso; Hungary	Stephan Bücker; Germany	Igor Prykhodko; Ukraine
LC m -84 kg	Zoltan Dancso; Hungary	Stephan Bücker; Germany	Toby Bermuller; Ireland
LC m -89 kg	Il Dar Gabasov; Russia	Fabian Fingerhut; Germany	Sanjin Dedic; Croatia
LC m -89 kg	Il Dar Gabasov; Russia	Fabian Fingerhut; Germany	Juso Prosic; Austria
LC m -94 kg	Boris Miskovic; Croatia	Maik Häfer; Germany	Ales Lorber; Slovenia
LC m -94 kg	Boris Miskovic; Croatia	Maik Häfer; Germany	Benjamin Persson; Canada
LC m +94 kg	Mikael Bäckström; Sweden	Konstantin Sizov; Russia	Istvan Toth; Hungary

== Low Kick ==
=== Women ===
Event	Gold	Silver	Bronze
LK f -48 kg	Hulya Yurdusever; Turkey	Denis Magalie; France	Marja-Liisa Vaenaenen; Finland
LK f -48 kg	Hulya Yurdusever; Turkey	Denis Magalie; France	Vira Makresova; Ukraine
LK f -52 kg	Largilliere Lizzie; France	Zeljana Pitesa; Croatia	Valentina Murgia; Italy
LK f -52 kg	Largilliere Lizzie; France	Zeljana Pitesa; Croatia	Sania Pereira; Portugal
LK f -56 kg	Iwona Nieroda; Poland	Melania Sorroche; Spain	Jovana Krstic; Serbia
LK f -56 kg	Iwona Nieroda; Poland	Melania Sorroche; Spain	Nadiya Khayenok; Ukraine
LK f -60 kg	Fatima Bokova; Russia	Kinga Siwa; Poland	Adib Fatima; France
LK f -60 kg	Fatima Bokova; Russia	Kinga Siwa; Poland	Marija Marlenica; Croatia
LK f -65 kg	Svetlana Kulakova; Russia	Mimma Mandolini; Italy	Moreau Cynthia; France
LK f -65 kg	Svetlana Kulakova; Russia	Mimma Mandolini; Italy	Anne Katas; Finland
LK f -70 kg	Diana Galina; Russia	Helena Jurisic; Croatia	Bakissy Laetitia; France

=== Men ===
Event	Gold	Silver	Bronze
LK m -51 kg	Rinat Beysekeev; Russia	Nurken Tolegenov; Kazakhstan	Danijel Bogdanovic; Serbia
LK m -51 kg	Rinat Beysekeev; Russia	Nurken Tolegenov; Kazakhstan	Kamran Orujov; Azerbaijan
LK m -54 kg	Astemir Borsov; Russia	Fabrice Bauluck; Mauritius	Emil Nurkovic; Montenegro
LK m -54 kg	Astemir Borsov; Russia	Fabrice Bauluck; Mauritius	Zhalussan Blok; Kazakhstan
LK m -57 kg	Yury Trogiyanov; Russia	Ikbol Fozilzhan; Kyrgyzstan	Boban Marinkovic; Serbia
LK m -57 kg	Yury Trogiyanov; Russia	Ikbol Fozilzhan; Kyrgyzstan	Baurzhan Kudaibergenov; Kazakhstan
LK m -60 kg	Milos Anic; Serbia	Eduard Mammadov; Azerbaijan	Chingiz Tlemisov; Kazakhstan
LK m -60 kg	Milos Anic; Serbia	Eduard Mammadov; Azerbaijan	Rousso Mustapha; France
LK m -63.5 kg	Denis Lukashov; Russia	Fikri Arican; Turkey	Perinne Facson; Mauritius
LK m -63.5 kg	Denis Lukashov; Russia	Fikri Arican; Turkey	Najafizadeh Sayed Hossein; Iran
LK m -67 kg	Shamil Abdulmedzhidov; Russia	Andrei Khamionak; Belarus	Babek Rustamov; Azerbaijan
LK m -67 kg	Shamil Abdulmedzhidov; Russia	Andrei Khamionak; Belarus	Kenan Gunaydin; Turkey
LK m -71 kg	Anatoliy Moiseev; Russia	Aleksandar Topic; Serbia	Mario Markovic; Bosnia and Herzegovina
LK m -71 kg	Anatoliy Moiseev; Russia	Aleksandar Topic; Serbia	Sayn Zhakupov; Kazakhstan
LK m -75 kg	Khasan Khaliev; Russia	Stevan Zivkovic; Serbia	Bocar Samba; France
LK m -75 kg	Khasan Khaliev; Russia	Stevan Zivkovic; Serbia	Alpay Kir; Turkey
LK m -81 kg	Aleksandr Drobinin; Russia	Igor Emkic; Bosnia and Herzegovina	Viktor Subic; Serbia
LK m -81 kg	Aleksandr Drobinin; Russia	Igor Emkic; Bosnia and Herzegovina	Zlatko Bajic; Croatia
LK m -86 kg	Luka Simic; Croatia	Iurii Zubchuk; Ukraine	Patryk Proszek; Poland
LK m -86 kg	Luka Simic; Croatia	Iurii Zubchuk; Ukraine	George Joseph; Canada
LK m -91 kg	Alexey Papin; Russia	Toni Milanovic; Croatia	Rashil Amankulov; Kyrgyzstan
LK m -91 kg	Alexey Papin; Russia	Toni Milanovic; Croatia	Jovan Kaludjerovic; Serbia

== K-1 Rules ==
=== Women ===
Event	Gold	Silver	Bronze
K1 f -48 kg	Khadija Eddbali; Morocco	Teona Lavrelashvili; Georgia	Fatima Zhagupova; Russia
K1 f -48 kg	Khadija Eddbali; Morocco	Teona Lavrelashvili; Georgia	Ariana Santos; Portugal
K1 f -52 kg	Therese Gunnarsson; Sweden	Yeliz Koblay; Turkey	Kseniya Kokorina; Russia
K1 f -52 kg	Therese Gunnarsson; Sweden	Yeliz Koblay; Turkey	Sanja Sucevic; Serbia
K1 f -56 kg	Marta Chojnoska; Poland	Yuliya Kuznetsova; Russia	Theodora Marinow; Canada
K1 f -56 kg	Marta Chojnoska; Poland	Yuliya Kuznetsova; Russia	Kinberly Tanaka Novaes; Brazil
K1 f -60 kg	Aicha El Majdy; Morocco	Maria Elin Olsson; Sweden	Atmani Saida; France
K1 f -60 kg	Aicha El Majdy; Morocco	Maria Elin Olsson; Sweden	Olga Stavrova; Russia
K1 f -65 kg	Page IeIo; France	Eva Halasi; Serbia	Kamila Balanda; Poland
K1 f -65 kg	Page IeIo; France	Eva Halasi; Serbia	Boglarka Brunner; Hungary
K1 f -70 kg	Tatiana Ovchinnikova; Russia	Hayley Banks-Cassidy; New Zealand	Sanja Tosic; Bosnia and Herzegovina

=== Men ===
Event	Gold	Silver	Bronze
K1 m -51 kg	Linar Batalov; Russia	Elshad Alasgarov; Azerbaijan	Farid Boulasdal; Morocco
K1 m -51 kg	Linar Batalov; Russia	Elshad Alasgarov; Azerbaijan	Mahmut Erdem; Turkey
K1 m -54 kg	Vadim Chasovskikh; Russia	Siarmei Skiba; Belarus	Milan Savic; Serbia
K1 m -54 kg	Vadim Chasovskikh; Russia	Siarmei Skiba; Belarus	Edson Ribeiro da Silva; Brazil
K1 m -57 kg	Vedat Uruc; Turkey	Nikolay Mamedov; Russia	Ivan Nedelchev; Bulgaria
K1 m -57 kg	Vedat Uruc; Turkey	Nikolay Mamedov; Russia	Patrick Bodacz; Hungary
K1 m -60 kg	Yakub Bersanukaev; Russia	Antoine Habash; Hungary	Aleksandar Gogic; Serbia
K1 m -60 kg	Yakub Bersanukaev; Russia	Antoine Habash; Hungary	Beaubrun Desty; France
K1 m -63.5 kg	Yury Zhukovski; Belarus	Hyun Woo Yuu; South Korea	Alexander Chernykh; Russia
K1 m -63.5 kg	Yury Zhukovski; Belarus	Hyun Woo Yuu; South Korea	Maciej Domisczak; Poland
K1 m -67 kg	Viacheslav Borshchev; Russia	Soifiane Zridy; Morocco	Piotr Kobylański; Poland
K1 m -67 kg	Viacheslav Borshchev; Russia	Soifiane Zridy; Morocco	Asset Taiganov; Kazakhstan
K1 m -71 kg	Valev Vladimir; Bulgaria	Taha Alami Marroni; Morocco	Hodzic Mirza; France
K1 m -71 kg	Valev Vladimir; Bulgaria	Taha Alami Marroni; Morocco	Alexander Zakharov; Russia
K1 m -75 kg	Viktor Zaman; Croatia	Ljubo Jalovi; Serbia	Dzmitry Baranau; Belarus
K1 m -75 kg	Viktor Zaman; Croatia	Ljubo Jalovi; Serbia	Nikolai Atanasov; Bulgaria
K1 m -81 kg	Dmytro Kirpan; Ukraine	Yordan Yankov; Bulgaria	Denis Apavaloae; Moldova
K1 m -81 kg	Dmytro Kirpan; Ukraine	Yordan Yankov; Bulgaria	Dzmitry Valent; Belarus
K1 m -86 kg	Suleyman Magomedov; Russia	Radoslaw Rydzewski; Poland	Darko Milosevic; Serbia
K1 m -86 kg	Suleyman Magomedov; Russia	Radoslaw Rydzewski; Poland	Gregory Grossi; France
K1 m -91 kg	Nenad Pagonis; Serbia	Bahrudin Mahmic; Bosnia and Herzegovina	Vladimir Mineev; Russia
K1 m -91 kg	Nenad Pagonis; Serbia	Bahrudin Mahmic; Bosnia and Herzegovina	Mustafa Kol; Turkey
K1 m +91 kg	Ruslan Magomedov; Russia	Alex Rossi; Italy	Adil Atmari; Morocco
K1 m +91 kg	Ruslan Magomedov; Russia	Alex Rossi; Italy	Deniss Smoldarev; Estonia
