= W.A.K.O. World Championships (Guarujá) 2013 =

Kickboxing event in Brazil

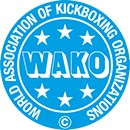
- The poster for W.A.K.O. World Championships (Guarujá) 2013
- Promotion: W.A.K.O.
- Date: September 28 to October 5, 2013
- City: Guarujá, Brazil

The WAKO World Championships 2013 for Low Kick (LK) and K-1 Rules were held in Guarujá, Brazil, from September 28 to October 5, 2013. The event was organized by the World Association of Kickboxing Organizations (WAKO).

== Disciplines ==
=== Low Kick (LK) ===
A full-contact discipline that allows punches and kicks to the head, body, and legs (thighs). It emphasizes power, endurance, and tactical use of low kicks to weaken opponents.

=== K-1 Rules ===
A format that permits punches, kicks, and knee strikes, with limited clinching. It is known for its fast pace and high-impact exchanges.

== Low Kick ==
=== Women ===
Event	Gold	Silver	Bronze
-48 kg	Diana Doktugu; Russia	Valentina Cabras; Italy	Binnur Sakal; Turkey
-48 kg	Diana Doktugu; Russia	Valentina Cabras; Italy	Sonia Pereira; Portugal
-52 kg	Sandra Drabik; Poland	Anna Poskrebysheva; Russia	Seda Eroglu; Turkey
-52 kg	Sandra Drabik; Poland	Anna Poskrebysheva; Russia	Valentina Murgia; Italy
-56 kg	Oxana Shchetinina; Russia	Ivani da Conceição Ferreira; Brazil	Seda Duygu Aygün; Turkey
-56 kg	Oxana Shchetinina; Russia	Ivani da Conceição Ferreira; Brazil	Kristin Skante; Sweden
-60 kg	Kinga Siwa; Poland	Fatima Bokova; Russia	Emily Whabby; Italy
-60 kg	Kinga Siwa; Poland	Fatima Bokova; Russia	Thea Therese Næss; Norway
-65 kg	Roza Gumienna; Poland	Cindy Perros; France	Barbara da Silva; Brazil
-65 kg	Roza Gumienna; Poland	Cindy Perros; France	Marija Malenica; Croatia
-70 kg	Nives Radić; Croatia	Diana Galina; Russia	Patricia González García; Spain
-70 kg	Nives Radić; Croatia	Diana Galina; Russia	Clicia Queiroz; Portugal
+70 kg	Barbara Nepomuceno de Oliveira; Brazil	Ana Bajić; Croatia	Ebru Ünal; Turkey
+70 kg	Barbara Nepomuceno de Oliveira; Brazil	Ana Bajić; Croatia	Anna Gladkikh; Russia

=== Men ===
Event	Gold	Silver	Bronze
-51 kg	Nurken Tulegenov; Kazakhstan	Clifton Mathieu Simiss; Mauritius	Heriniaina Jean Christian; Madagascar
-51 kg	Nurken Tulegenov; Kazakhstan	Clifton Mathieu Simiss; Mauritius	Edson Ribeiro da Silva; Brazil
-54 kg	Fabrice Michel Bauluck; Mauritius	Mahmut Erdem; Turkey	Jacoba Gilbert; Madagascar
-54 kg	Fabrice Michel Bauluck; Mauritius	Mahmut Erdem; Turkey	Maycon de Oliveira; Brazil
-57 kg	Sergek Oorzhak; Russia	Omer Balaban; Turkey	Ikapi Nzamba Wills Power; Gabon
-57 kg	Sergek Oorzhak; Russia	Omer Balaban; Turkey	Baurzhan Kudaibergenov; Kazakhstan
-60 kg	Ramazan Cicek; Turkey	Milos Anic; Serbia	Timur Belkheev; Russia
-60 kg	Ramazan Cicek; Turkey	Milos Anic; Serbia	Elio Pinto; Italy
-63.5 kg	Aleksandar Konovalov; Serbia	Facson Perrine; Mauritius	Yannick Reine; France
-63.5 kg	Aleksandar Konovalov; Serbia	Facson Perrine; Mauritius	Aliaskhab Patichiev; Russia
-67 kg	Shamil Abdulmedzhedov; Russia	Andrei Khamionak; Belarus	Kenan Gunaydin; Turkey
-67 kg	Shamil Abdulmedzhedov; Russia	Andrei Khamionak; Belarus	Mate Rudan; Croatia
-71 kg	Shamil Gasanbekov; Russia	Luka Tomic; Croatia	Aleksandar Topic; Serbia
-71 kg	Shamil Gasanbekov; Russia	Luka Tomic; Croatia	Eduard Bernadou; France
-75 kg	Khasan Khaliev; Russia	Babirzhan Artykbaev; Kazakhstan	Viktor Subic; Serbia
-75 kg	Khasan Khaliev; Russia	Babirzhan Artykbaev; Kazakhstan	Tadeu San Martino; Brazil
-81 kg	Veejaye Agathe; Mauritius	Michal Maczka; Poland	Atanas Bozhilov; Bulgaria
-81 kg	Veejaye Agathe; Mauritius	Michal Maczka; Poland	Stevan Zivkovic; Serbia
-86 kg	Basir Abakarov; Russia	Luka Simic; Croatia	Mehmet Nadir Unal; Turkey
-86 kg	Basir Abakarov; Russia	Luka Simic; Croatia	Thomas Neugebauer; Germany
-91 kg	Nenad Pagonis; Serbia	Agron Preteni; Croatia	Igor Darmeshkin; Russia
-91 kg	Nenad Pagonis; Serbia	Agron Preteni; Croatia	Zakhar Vorobey; Kazakhstan
+91 kg	Shamil Abbasov; Russia	Felipe Stievano Micheletti; Brazil	Stefan Andjelkovic; Serbia
+91 kg	Shamil Abbasov; Russia	Felipe Stievano Micheletti; Brazil	Ante Verunica; Croatia

== K1 Rules ==
=== Women ===
Event	Gold	Silver	Bronze
-48 kg	Eda Eroglu; Turkey	Alena Liashkevich; Belarus	Fatima Zhagupova; Russia
-48 kg	Eda Eroglu; Turkey	Alena Liashkevich; Belarus	Martina Bernile; Italy
-52 kg	Lari Farinaz; Iran	Sanja Sucevic; Serbia	Therese Gunnarsson; Sweden
-52 kg	Lari Farinaz; Iran	Sanja Sucevic; Serbia	Yeliz Koblay; Turkey
-56 kg	Alena Hola; Czech Republic	Qianhui Fan; China	Anzhela Takhirova; Russia
-56 kg	Alena Hola; Czech Republic	Qianhui Fan; China	Camila Rivarola; Sweden
-60 kg	Alena Muratava; Belarus	Maria Olsson; Sweden	Ingrid Hanf; Canada
-60 kg	Alena Muratava; Belarus	Maria Olsson; Sweden	Olga Stavrova; Russia
-65 kg	Eva Halasi; Serbia	Juliana Werner de Aguiar; Brazil	Kamila Balanda; Poland
-65 kg	Eva Halasi; Serbia	Juliana Werner de Aguiar; Brazil	Silvia Bortot; Italy
-70 kg	Lucie Mlejnkova; Czech Republic	Helena Jurisic; Croatia	Zelda Malherbe; South Africa
-70 kg	Lucie Mlejnkova; Czech Republic	Helena Jurisic; Croatia	Annalisa Bucci; Italy
+70 kg	Paulina Biec; Poland	Ekaterina Zyablikova; Russia	Manuela Martini; Brazil
+70 kg	Paulina Biec; Poland	Ekaterina Zyablikova; Russia	Bugce Haslaman; Turkey

=== Men ===
Event	Gold	Silver	Bronze
-51 kg	Siarhei Skiba; Belarus	Shiyu Zheng; China	Milen Marinov; Bulgaria
-51 kg	Siarhei Skiba; Belarus	Shiyu Zheng; China	Alexei Spirin; Russia
-54 kg	Astemir Borsov; Russia	Serkan Katikci; Turkey	Fabrizio Lodde; Italy
-54 kg	Astemir Borsov; Russia	Serkan Katikci; Turkey	Maycon de Oliveira; Brazil
-57 kg	Vedat Uruc; Turkey	Guang Yang; China	Bakhtiiar Mukhamedzhanov; Russia
-57 kg	Vedat Uruc; Turkey	Guang Yang; China	Daniel de Mattos Gonçalves; Brazil
-60 kg	Umar Paskhaev; Russia	Murat Antepli; Turkey	Maronirina Gastros; Madagascar
-60 kg	Umar Paskhaev; Russia	Murat Antepli; Turkey	Murat Azerbiev; Belarus
-63.5 kg	Shamil Gadzhimusayev; Russia	Cristian Spetcu; Romania	Sasa Jovanovic; Austria
-63.5 kg	Shamil Gadzhimusayev; Russia	Cristian Spetcu; Romania	Cristian Spetcu; Romania
-67 kg	Ilya Usachev; Russia	Unal Alkayis; Turkey	Jason Hinds; Canada
-67 kg	Ilya Usachev; Russia	Unal Alkayis; Turkey	Itay Gershon; Israel
-71 kg	Vladimir Vulev; Bulgaria	Marcin Parcheta; Poland	Magomed Magomedov; Russia
-71 kg	Vladimir Vulev; Bulgaria	Marcin Parcheta; Poland	Aleksandar Topic; Serbia
-75 kg	Ljubo Jalovi; Serbia	Pawel Biszczak; Poland	Lirim Ahmeti; Austria
-75 kg	Ljubo Jalovi; Serbia	Pawel Biszczak; Poland	Tadeu San Martino; Brazil
-81 kg	Miljan Vidovic; Serbia	Yordan Yankov; Bulgaria	Laszlo Szabo; Hungary
-81 kg	Miljan Vidovic; Serbia	Yordan Yankov; Bulgaria	Aleksandr Drobinin; Russia
-86 kg	Suleyman Magomedov; Russia	Dawid Kasperski; Poland	Teppo Laine; Finland
-86 kg	Suleyman Magomedov; Russia	Dawid Kasperski; Poland	Uros Bogojevic; Serbia
-91 kg	Sergej Maslobojev; Lithuania	Alex Sandro Pereira; Brazil	Andrey Khlynovskii; Russia
-91 kg	Sergej Maslobojev; Lithuania	Alex Sandro Pereira; Brazil	Mattia Faraoni; Italy
+91 kg	Abdarhamane Coulibaly; France	Aliaksei Kudin; Belarus	Kostadin Kostov; Bulgaria
+91 kg	Abdarhamane Coulibaly; France	Aliaksei Kudin; Belarus	Nadyr Gadzhiev; Russia
