= Toni Milanović =

Croatian kickboxer (born 1990)

- Born: Toni Milanović; March 25, 1990 (age 36); Split, Croatia
- Nationality: Croatian
- Height: 1.88 m (6 ft 2 in)
- Weight: 93.3 kg (206 lb; 14 st 10 lb)
- Division: Cruiserweight
- Style: Kickboxing, Muay Thai
- Stance: Orthodox
- Team: Ameno Gym 2008; Joker Gym 2011; Terminator Gym; Pit Bull Split 2014
- Trainer: Marko Zaja, Gordan Vatavuk
- Years active: since 2006

Kickboxing record
- Total: 38
- Wins: 29
- By knockout: 9
- Losses: 9

Amateur record
- Total: 72
- Wins: 61
- Losses: 11
- Last updated on: August 31, 2014

Toni Milanović is a Croatian cruiserweight kickboxer from Split, Croatia.

== Career and biography ==
On November 24, 2012, Milanović won Souboj Titánů, a four-man tournament under K-1 rules in Plzeň, Czech Republic. In the semifinals, Jan Tůma was two times in knockdown. In the final, Keclik also suffered knockdown and Milanović he took deserved victory over David Keclik. He was awarded King of the titans title as the best fighter on the tournament, who was invited only one day before it happened.

On December 9, 2012, he was scheduled to fight the best Serbian kickboxer Nenad Pagonis on Supreme Fighting Championship organisation, but the opponent withdrew from the fight due to injury. However he faced much heavier Serbian fighter Dragan Jovanović; he weighed 104 kg (229 lb) and Milanović around 94 kg (207 lb). Jovanović was gold medalist in W.A.K.O. European Championships in Ankara, Turkey 2012. Milanović won the fight by unanimous judges' decision. The fight was held in Supreme FC organisation.

He faced Jason Wilnis in a super fight at K-1 World Grand Prix FINAL in Zagreb on March 15, 2013, in the -85 kg category. Before the fight he said: "May plan is to prove in the near future that I'm the best fighter in the world in this weight class". At official weigh-ins, Milanović weighed 84.8 kg. However, he lost the fight in the first round.

He took a unanimous decision victory over Ibrahim El Bouni at Final Fight Championship 3: Jurković vs. Cătinaș in Split on April 19, 2013.

== Doping suspension ==
In 2012, Milanović was banned for four years by the Disciplinary Commission of the Croatian Muaythai Federation after he tested positive in 2010 for three banned substances, including boldenone, salbutamol and methylhexanamine. Initially, he was suspended for only one year but the World Anti-Doping Agency (WADA) appealed to the Court of Arbitration for Sport.

== Titles ==
=== Professional ===
- 2015 Venum Victory World Series -95 kg Elimination Tournament Champion
- 2012 Souboj Titánů tournament champion -86 kg (K-1 rules)

=== Amateur ===
- 2016 W.A.K.O. European Championships in Maribor, Slovenia (bronze) −91 kg (Low-Kick rules)
- 2015 Croatian kickboxing championship (silver) +91 kg (K-1 rules)
- 2014 Croatian kickboxing championship (bronze) +91 kg (Low-kick rules)
- 2013 Croatian kickboxing championship (gold) -86 kg (Low-kick rules)
- 2011 W.A.K.O. World Championships in Skopje, Macedonia (silver) −91 kg (Low-Kick rules)
- 2010 W.A.K.O. European Championships in Baku, Azerbaijan (silver) −91 kg (Low-Kick rules)
- 2010 Croatian kickboxing championship (gold) -91 kg (Low-kick rules)
- 2009 W.A.K.O. World Championships in Villach, Austria (bronze) −86 kg (Low-Kick rules)
- 2009 W.A.K.O. World Cup in Sarajevo, Bosnia and Herzegovina (gold) −91 kg (Low-Kick rules)
- 2009 Croatian junior kickboxing championship (gold) -86 kg (Low-Kick rules) (Defeated Luka Šimić)
- 2008 W.A.K.O. World Junior Championships in Naples, Italy (silver) −86 kg (Low-Kick rules)
- 2008 Croatian kickboxing championship (gold) -86 kg (Low-kick rules)
- 2008 Croatian junior kickboxing championship (gold) -81 kg (K-1 rules) (Defeated Luka Jurić)
- 2008 Croatian kickboxing championship (silver) -81 kg (K-1 rules)
- 2008 Croatian junior kickboxing championship (bronze) -75 kg (Low-kick rules)
- 2007 Croatian junior kickboxing championship (silver) -75 kg (K-1 rules)

== Kickboxing record ==
Professional kickboxing record

Date	Result	Opponent	Event	Location	Method	Round	Time
2015-11-28	Loss	(Moldova) Alexandru Burduja	Venum Victory World Series 2015, Semifinals	Paris, France	Decision	3	3:00
2015-10-23	Loss	(Czech Republic) Ondřej Hutník	Heroes Gate 15	Prague, Czech Republic	Decision	3	3:00
2015-05-30	Loss	(Czech Republic) Jan Soukup	Obračun u Ringu 13	Split, Croatia	Decision (Unanimous)	3	3:00
2015-04-11	Win	(Romania) Lucian Danilencu	Oktagon 2015: 20 years edition, Final	Milan, Italy	Ext. R. TKO (Towel Thrown)	4	
Wins Venum Victory World Series -95 kg Elimination Tournament Title.
2015-04-11	Win	(Czech Republic) Chris Kaje Kojo	Oktagon 2015: 20 years edition, Semifinals	Milan, Italy	Decision (Unanimous)	3	3:00
2014-12-20	Loss	(Brazil) Felipe Micheletti	WGP 24	São Paulo, Brazil	Decision (Unanimous)	3	3:00
2014-08-25	Win	(Bosnia and Herzegovina) Draženko Čosović	Obračun u Ringu 12	Vis, Croatia	KO (Punches)	1	
2014-07-03	Win	(Austria) Labinot Zekaj	Night of Gladiators 9	Dubrovnik, Croatia	TKO (Right Hand)	1	
2013-04-18	Win	(Morocco) Ibrahim El Bouni	FFC03: Jurković vs. Cătinaș	Split, Croatia	Decision (Unanimous)	3	3:00
2013-03-15	Loss	(Netherlands) Jason Wilnis	K-1 World Grand Prix FINAL in Zagreb, Super Fight	Zagreb, Croatia	TKO	1	
2012-12-09	Win	(Serbia) Dragan Jovanović	Supreme FC	Belgrade, Serbia	Decision (Unanimous)	3	3:00
2012-11-24	Win	(Austria) David Keclik	Souboj Titánů, Final	Plzeň, Czech Republic	Decision (Split)	3	3:00
Wins "Souboj Titánů" tournament. He was given the title "King of the titans" as the best fighter of the tournament.
2012-11-24	Win	(Czech Republic) Jan Tůma	Souboj Titánů, Semifinals	Plzeň, Czech Republic	Decision (Unanimous)	3	3:00
2012-10-20	Loss	(Romania) Andrei Stoica	SUPERKOMBAT World Grand Prix IV 2012	Arad, Romania	Decision (Split)	3	3:00
2012-06-30	Loss	(France) Stéphane Susperregui	F.A.S.T. gala	Bayonne, France	Decision (Unanimous)		3:00
2012-03-10	Loss	(Armenia) Sahak Parparyan	Cro Cop Final Fight	Zagreb, Croatia	Decision (Unanimous)	3	3:00
2012-02-10	Win	(Croatia) Igor Mihaljević	VVVF - Veni Vidi Vici Fights	Karlovac, Croatia	Decision (Unanimous)	3	3:00
2011-05-01	Win	(Hungary) Tibor Nagy	W.A.K.O. Pro WGP Croatia vs Hungary, quarterfinal	Budapest, Hungary	Decision (Unanimous)	3	3:00
2010-07-17	Win	(Hungary) Imre Torok	Svpetrvs Fight Night 3	Supetar, Croatia	Decision (Unanimous)	3	3:00
2009-07-18	Win	(Croatia) Ivan Kulić	Svpetrvs Fight Night 2	Supetar, Croatia	Decision (Unanimous)	3	3:00
2009-03-22	Loss	(Croatia) Agron Preteni	K-1 ColliZion 2009 Croatia	Split, Croatia	Decision (unanimous)	3	3:00

Amateur kickboxing record

Date	Result	Opponent	Event	Location	Method	Round	Time
2016-10-28	Loss	(Russia) Elmar Guseinov	W.A.K.O European Championships 2016, Low-Kick Semifinals -91 kg	Maribor, Slovenia	0:3	3	2:00
Wins W.A.K.O. European Championship '16 Low-Kick Bronze Medal -91 kg.
2015-03-21	Loss	(Croatia) Ante Verunica	Croatian Kickboxing Championship, K-1 Final +91 kg	Slunj, Croatia	Decision (Split)	3	2:00
Wins Croatian Kickboxing Championship K-1 Rules Silver Medal +91 kg.
2015-03-21	Win	(Croatia) Senad Ramakić	Croatian Kickboxing Championship, K-1 Semifinals +91 kg	Slunj, Croatia	Decision (Unanimous)	3	2:00
2014-04-12	Loss	(Croatia) Nato Cvitan	Croatian Kickboxing Championship, Low-kick Semifinals +91 kg	Poreč, Croatia	No Fight		
Wins Croatian Kickboxing Championship Low-kick Bronze Medal +91 kg.
2014-04-12	Win	(Croatia) Bože Bagarić	Croatian Kickboxing Championship, Low-kick Quarterfinals +91 kg	Poreč, Croatia	Decision (Unanimous)	3	2:00
2013-05-18	Win	(Croatia) Matijas Barić	Croatian Kickboxing Championship, Low-kick Final -86 kg	Šibenik, Croatia	Walk Over		
Wins Croatian Kickboxing Championship Low-kick Gold Medal -86 kg.
2013-05-18	Win	(Croatia) Fatmir Deskaj	Croatian Kickboxing Championship, Low-kick Semifinals -86 kg	Šibenik, Croatia	Walk Over		
2013-05-18	Win	(Croatia) Marino Šestan	Croatian Kickboxing Championship, Low-kick Quarterfinals -86 kg	Šibenik, Croatia	Walk Over		
2011-11-02	Loss	(Russia) Alexei Papin	W.A.K.O World Championships 2011, Low-Kick Final -91 kg	Skopje, Macedonia	Decision (Unanimous)	3	2:00
Wins W.A.K.O. World Championship '11 Low-Kick Silver Medal -91 kg.
2011-10-28	Win	(Serbia) Jovan Kaluđerović	W.A.K.O World Championships 2011, Low-Kick Semifinals -91 kg	Skopje, Macedonia	Decision (Unanimous)	3	2:00
2011-10-25	Win	(Bosnia and Herzegovina) Denis Marijanović	W.A.K.O World Championships 2011, Low-Kick Quarterfinals -91 kg	Skopje, Macedonia	Decision (Unanimous)	3	2:00
2010-10-24	Loss	(Russia) Alexei Papin	W.A.K.O European Championships 2010, Low-Kick Final -91 kg	Baku, Azerbaijan	Decision (Unanimous)	3	2:00
Wins W.A.K.O. European Championship '10 Low-Kick Silver Medal -91 kg.
2010-10-22	Win	(Slovenia) Uroš Veličević	W.A.K.O European Championships 2010, Low-Kick Semifinals -91 kg	Baku, Azerbaijan	Decision (Unanimous)	3	2:00
2010-10-21	Win	(Azerbaijan) Sarxan Djabakov	W.A.K.O European Championships 2010, Low-Kick Quarterfinals -91 kg	Baku, Azerbaijan	Decision (Split)	3	2:00
2009-10-24	Loss	(Slovakia) Michal Hromek	W.A.K.O World Championships 2010, Low-Kick Semifinals -86 kg	Villach, Austria	Decision (Unanimous)	3	2:00
Wins W.A.K.O. World Championship '12 Low-Kick Bronze Medal -86 kg.
2009-05-10	Win	(Bosnia and Herzegovina) Miloš Golčić	W.A.K.O Super World Cup 2009, Low-kick Final -91 kg	Sarajevo, Bosnia and Herzegovina	Decision (Unanimous)	3	2:00
Wins W.A.K.O. World Cup '09 Low-kick Gold Medal -91 kg.
2009-05-??	Win	(Serbia) Marko Milinković	W.A.K.O Super World Cup 2009, Low-kick Semifinals -91 kg	Sarajevo, Bosnia and Herzegovina	Decision (Unanimous)	3	2:00
2008-09-??	Loss	(Croatia) Agron Preteni	W.A.K.O Junior World Championships 2008, Low-kick Final -86 kg	Naples, Italy	Decision (Unanimous)	3	2:00
Wins W.A.K.O. Junior World Championship '08 Low-kick Silver Medal -86 kg.
2008-09-??	Win	(Russia) Spartak Romanov	W.A.K.O Junior World Championships 2008, Low-kick Semifinals -86 kg	Naples, Italy	Decision (Split)	3	2:00
2008-09-??	Win	(Bosnia and Herzegovina) Josip Semren	W.A.K.O Junior World Championships 2008, Low-kick Quarterfinals -86 kg	Naples, Italy	Decision (Unanimous)	3	2:00

Legend: Win Loss Draw/No contest Notes

== See also ==
- List of WAKO Amateur World Championships
- List of WAKO Amateur European Championships
- List of male kickboxers
