= Alexei Papin =

Russian kickboxer and boxer

Alexey Papin
- Born: October 6, 1987 (age 39); Reutov, Soviet Union
- Native name: Алексей Папин
- Nationality: Russian
- Height: 1.85 m (6 ft 1 in)
- Weight: 91 kg (201 lb; 14 st 5 lb)
- Division: Light heavyweight (Kickboxing); Cruiserweight (Boxing)
- Style: Kickboxing
- Stance: Orthodox
- Fighting out of: Reutov, Russia
- Team: CSKA Moscow
- Years active: 2010–present

Professional boxing record
- Total: 20
- Wins: 18
- By knockout: 17
- Losses: 1
- By knockout: 0
- Draws: 0
- No contests: 1

Kickboxing record
- Total: 12
- Wins: 10
- By knockout: 3
- Losses: 1
- By knockout: 0
- Draws: 1

Other information
- Boxing record from BoxRec

Alexey Vasilyevich Papin (Russian: Алексей Васильевич Папин, romanized: Alexey Vasilyevich Papin; born 6 October 1987) is a Russian professional boxer and former kickboxer who held the IBF International title in 2018 and 2019.

== Kickboxing career ==
He challenged Nenad Pagonis for W.A.K.O. Pro Low-Kick Rules Cruiser Heavyweight World Championship on 9 March 2013 in Monte Carlo, Monaco, losing the fight by split decision. Revenge happened on 29 June 2013 in Moscow, Russia. This time Papin won the fight after second round by retirement, with Pagonis injuring his elbow. Papin added W.A.K.O. Pro Low-Kick Rules Cruiser Heavyweight World Championship in his treasury alongside ISKA Low-Kick Rules Super-cruiserweight World Championship and W5 Low-Kick Rules Championship.

== Boxing career ==
Papin made his professional boxing debut against Sergey Beloshapkin on November 21, 2015. He won the fight by a fourth-round knockout. He amassed a 9–0 record during the next two years, stopping all but one of his opponents.

Papin was scheduled to face Willbeforce Shihepo for the vacant IBF International Cruiserweight title on June 23, 2018, at the Floyd Mayweather Boxing Academy in Zhukovka, Russia. He won the fight by an eight-round technical knockout. Papin knocked down Shihepo in the first round, although the Namibian was able to recover from it. Papin continued to land damaging strikes to his opponent however, opening a cut on Shihepo in the fifth round, before he knocked him down once again in the eight round. Following the second knockdown, the referee decided to stop the fight.

A year later, on June 16, 2019, Papin was scheduled to fight Alexandru Jur for the IBF International cruiserweight title, which Papain had in the meantime vacated. Papin won the fight by a third-round knockout, stopping Jur at the 19 seconds into the round.

It was revealed on July 12, 2019, that Papin would challenge the reigning WBC Silver Cruiserweight titleholder Ilunga Makabu. The fight was confirmed fort the undercard of the Sergey Kovalev versus Anthony Yarde light heavyweight clash, which was scheduled for August 24, 2019, at the Traktor Ice Arena in Chelyabinsk, Russia. Makabu won the fight by majority decision, with two judges awarding him a 115–113 scorecard, while the third judge scored it as a 113–113 draw.

Papin was scheduled to face the fifth-ranked WBC cruiserweight contender Ruslan Fayfer in a WBC title eliminator on August 22, 2020, at the Pyramide in Kazan, Russia. Papin won the fight by a sixth-round knockout. Fayfer appeared up on the scorecards by the time of the stoppage, successfully scoring points from the outside and evading or blocking most of Papin's strikes. Early in sixth round, Papin dropped Fayfer with a left hook and punched him with two right hooks as he was going down. Although he was able to beat the count, the referee nonetheless decided to wave the fight off.

Papin was scheduled to face Vaclav Pejsar on April 2, 2021, at the Soviet Wings Sport Palace in Moscow, Russia, in a stay-busy fight. He made quick work of his journeyman opponent, and won by a first-round knockout. Pejsar was knocked down with a right overhand midway through the round, but was able to make it up before the eight count was finished. He was unable to mount any proper defense however, and was knocked out at the 2:10 minute mark of the round.

Papin was booked to face the one-time WBO world cruiserweight title challenger Dilan Prašović on May 27, 2022, at the Avangard Ice Hockey Academy in Omsk, Russia. He won the fight by a second-round stoppage, knocking Prašović down five times before the referee stopped the bout. Papin faced Damir Beljo on October 29, 2022, in his second bout of the year. He won the fight by a second-round knockout.

Papin faced the undefeated Soslan Asbarov on October 28, 2023, following a year-long absence from the sport. Despite entering the bout as a favorite, Papin lost the contest by way of unanimous decision. The three ringside officials awarded Asbarov scorecards of 96–93, 99–90 and 98–91.

Papin was expected to face Austine Nnamdi for the vacant EBP cruiserweight title on March 8, 2024. Nnamdi was unable to fly to Russia due to problems with documents and was replaced by Igor Vilchitskiy, who stepped in on a day's notice. Papin captured the vacant championship by way of a fifth-round knockout.

On December 13, 2024, Papin faced Greg Hardy in Russia and won by knockout in the third round.

== Titles ==
=== Boxing ===
- 2018 IBF International Cruiserweight title
- 2019 IBF International Cruiserweight title

=== Kickboxing ===
Professional

- 2013 W.A.K.O. Pro Low-Kick Rules Cruiser Heavyweight World Champion -94.1 kg
- 2012 W5 World Champion
- 2012 W5 Low-Kick Rules Champion -91 kg
- 2012 ISKA Low-Kick Rules Super-cruiserweight World Champion -91.8 kg
- 2011 Russian Professional Kickboxing Heavyweight Champion

Amateur

- 2012 W.A.K.O. European Championships in Ankara, Turkey (bronze) −91 kg (Low-Kick rules)
- 2011 W.A.K.O. World Championships in Skopje, Macedonia (gold) −91 kg (Low-Kick rules)
- 2011 W.A.K.O. World Cup Diamond (gold) −91 kg (K-1 rules)
- 2011 W.A.K.O. World Cup in Rimini, Italy (gold) −91 kg (Full-Contact rules)
- 2010 W.A.K.O. European Championships in Loutraki, Greece (gold) −91 kg (Full-Contact rules)
- 2010 W.A.K.O. European Championships in Baku, Azerbaijan (gold) −91 kg (Low-Kick rules)
- 2009 W.A.K.O. World Championships in Villach, Austria (bronze) +91 kg (K-1 rules)
- 2008 W.A.K.O. European Championships in Porto, Portugal (gold) -86 kg (Low-Kick rules)

== Professional boxing record ==
20 fights	18 wins	1 loss
By knockout	17	0
By decision	1	1
No contests	1	

No.	Result	Record	Opponent	Type	Round, time	Date	Location	Notes
20	Win	18–1 (1)	Felix Valera	TKO	5 (12), 2:23	Aug 30, 2024	Ice Palace, Cherepovets, Russia	Won vacant WBA Asia cruiserweight title
19	Win	17–1 (1)	Isaac Chilemba	KO	2 (8), 2:50	May 24, 2024	Balashikha Arena, Balashikha, Russia	Won vacant WBA Asia East cruiserweight title
18	Win	16–1 (1)	Igor Vilchitskiy	KO	5 (10), 2:21	Mar 8, 2024	Yakub Koblev Sports Palace, Maykop, Russia	Won vacant EBP cruiserweight title.
17	NC	15–1 (1)	Soslan Asbarov	NC	10	Oct 28, 2023	CSKA Arena, Moscow, Russia	Originally a UD win for Asbarov, later ruled a NC after a failed drug test
16	Win	15–1	Damir Beljo	KO	2 (10), 2:05	Oct 29, 2022	Irina Viner Gymnastics Palace, Moscow, Russia	
15	Win	14–1	Dilan Prašović	KO	2 (10), 1:37	May 27, 2022	Avangard Ice Hockey Academy, Omsk, Russia	
14	Win	13–1	Vaclav Pejsar	TKO	1 (10), 2:10	Apr 2, 2021	Soviet Wings Sport Palace, Moscow, Russia	
13	Win	12–1	Ruslan Fayfer	TKO	6 (12), 0:36	Aug 22, 2020	Pyramide, Kazan, Russia	
12	Loss	11–1	Ilunga Makabu	MD	12	Aug 24, 2019	Traktor Ice Arena, Chelyabinsk, Russia	For WBC Silver cruiserweight title.
11	Win	11–0	Alexandru Jur	KO	3 (10), 0:19	Jun 16, 2019	KRK Uralets, Ekaterinburg, Russia	Won vacant IBF International cruiserweight title.
10	Win	10–0	Willbeforce Shihepo	TKO	8 (12), 0:24	Jun 23, 2018	Floyd Mayweather Boxing Academy, Zhukovka, Russia	Won vacant IBF International cruiserweight title.
9	Win	9–0	Ismayl Sillah	KO	1 (10), 2:07	Nov 27, 2017	Luzhniki Stadium, Moscow, Russia	
8	Win	8–0	Marcos Antonio Aumada	KO	3 (10), 2:31	Aug 26, 2017	Aura Club, Voronezh, Russia	
7	Win	7–0	Rogelio Omar Rossi	KO	2 (8), 1:20	May 27, 2017	Event-Hall, Solnechny, Khabarovsk Krai, Russia	
6	Win	6–0	Sergio Alberto Anjel	TKO	1 (8), 2:04	Mar 4, 2017	Balashikha Arena, Balashikha, Russia	
5	Win	5–0	Israel Duffus	TKO	5 (6), 2:58	Dec 17, 2016	Ekaterinburg Expo, Ekaterinburg, Russia	
4	Win	4–0	Jorge Rodriguez Olivera	TKO	1 (6), 1:10	Sep 9, 2016	Soviet Wings Sport Palace, Moscow, Russia	
3	Win	3–0	Yury Bykhautsou	UD	6	May 21, 2016	Megasport Sport Palace, Moscow, Russia	
2	Win	2–0	Ilya Rolgeyzer	RTD	4 (6), 3:00	Feb 13, 2016	Boxing & Gym Academy, Moscow, Russia	
1	Win	1–0	Sergey Beloshapkin	TKO	4 (4), 1:27	Nov 21, 2015	KRC Arbat, Moscow, Russia	

== Exhibition boxing record ==
1 fight	1 win	0 losses
By knockout	1	0

No.	Result	Record	Opponent	Type	Round, time	Date	Location	Notes
1	Win	1–0	Greg Hardy	KO	3 (6), 1:39	Dec 13, 2024	Megasport Sport Palace, Moscow, Russia	

== Kickboxing record ==
Professional kickboxing record
10 Wins (3 (T)KO's), 1 Losses, 1 Draw, 0 No Contest
Date	Result	Opponent	Event	Location	Method	Round	Time	Record
2015-08-04	Win	(Germany) Danyo Ilunga	Fight Night Saint-Tropez	Saint Tropez, France	Decision (unanimous)	4	2:00	10-1-1
2015-03-13	Win	(Azerbaijan) Agalar Sadikhzade	Heydar Aliyev Cup	St. Petersburg, Russia	KO (right high kick)	2		9-1-1
2013-06-29	Win	(Serbia) Nenad Pagonis	Martial Arts Festival	Moscow, Russia	TKO (injury)	3	0:00	8-1-1
Wins W.A.K.O. Pro Low-Kick Rules Cruiser Heavyweight World Title -94.1 kg.
2013-03-09	Loss	(Serbia) Nenad Pagonis	Monte Carlo Fighting Masters	Monte Carlo, Monaco	Decision (split)	3	3:00	7-1-1
For Vacant W.A.K.O. Pro Low Kick rules cruiser heavyweight world title -94.1 kg.
2013-04-20	Win	(Belarus) Andrei Gerasimchuk	Battle at Moscow 11	Moscow, Russia	Decision (majority)	3	3:00	7-0-1
2012-05-26	Win	(Russia) Elvin Abbasov	Battle of Ural	Verkhnyaya Pyshma, Russia	Decision (unanimous)	3	3:00	6-0-1
2012-05-01	Win	(Belarus) Andrei Gerasimchuk	Papin vs Gerasimchuk	Moscow, Russia	Decision (unanimous)	5	3:00	5-0-1
2012-03-03	Win	(Algeria) Zinedine Hameur-Lain	Martial Arts Festival "For Russia" - 2	Chelyabinsk, Russia	KO	4		4-0-1
Wins W5 World Low-Kick Rules Championship -91.8 kg.
2012-01-01	Win							3-0-1
Wins ISKA Low-Kick Rules Super-cruiserweight World Title -91.8 kg.
2011-12-23	Win	(Belarus) Igor Bugaenko	Rod Fighting - Shield and Sword 1	Moscow, Russia	Ext. R. Decision	4	3:00	2-0-1
2011-03-05	Win	(Russia) Vitaliy Shemetov	Spear of Peresvet 2011	Sergiyev Posad, Russia	Decision (unanimous)	5	3:00	1-0-1
Wins Russian Professional Kickboxing Heavyweight Championship.
2010-08-07	Draw	(Russia) Anton Berdnikov	Battlefield	Ryazan, Russia	Decision	3	2:00	0-0-1

Amateur kickboxing record
Date	Result	Opponent	Event	Location	Method	Round	Time
2012-11	Loss	(Germany) Eugen Waigel	W.A.K.O World Championships 2012, Full-Contact Final -91 kg	Bucharest, Romania	TKO (injury)	1	
Wins W.A.K.O. World Championship '12 Full-Contact Silver Medal -91 kg.
2012-11-29	Win	(Ukraine) Igor Prykhodko	W.A.K.O World Championships 2012, Full-Contact Semi Finals -91 kg	Bucharest, Romania			
2012-11-28	Win	(Italy) Mattia Bezzon	W.A.K.O World Championships 2012, Full-Contact Quarter Finals -91 kg	Bucharest, Romania			
2012-11-01	Loss	(Croatia) Agron Preteni	W.A.K.O European Championships 2012, Low-Kick Semi Finals -91 kg	Ankara, Turkey	Decision (unanimous)	3	2:00
Wins W.A.K.O. European Championship '12 Low-Kick Bronze Medal -91 kg.
2011-11-02	Win	(Croatia) Toni Milanović	W.A.K.O World Championships 2011, Low-Kick Final -91 kg	Skopje, Macedonia	Decision (Unanimous)	3	2:00
Wins W.A.K.O. World Championship '11 Low-Kick Gold Medal -91 kg.
2011-10-28	Win	(Kyrgyzstan) Rashil Amankulov	W.A.K.O World Championships 2011, Low-Kick Semi Finals -91 kg	Skopje, Macedonia			
2010-11-25	Win	(Poland) Denis Simkin	W.A.K.O European Championships 2010, Full contact Semi Finals -91 kg	Loutraki, Greece			
Wins W.A.K.O. European Championship '10 Full-Contact Gold Medal -91 kg.
2010-11-25	Win	(Greece) Christodoulos Gkerekos	W.A.K.O European Championships 2010, Full contact Semi Finals -91 kg	Loutraki, Greece			
2010-11-23	Win	(Republic of Ireland) Cormac O'Connor	W.A.K.O European Championships 2010, Full contact Quarter Finals -91 kg	Loutraki, Greece	TKO		
2010-10-24	Win	(Croatia) Toni Milanović	W.A.K.O European Championships 2010, Low-Kick Final -91 kg	Baku, Azerbaijan	Decision (Unanimous)	3	2:00
Wins W.A.K.O. European Championship '10 Low-Kick Silver Medal -91 kg.
2010-10-22	Win	(Serbia) Jovan Kaluđerović	W.A.K.O European Championships 2010, Low-Kick Semi Finals -91 kg	Baku, Azerbaijan			
2009-10	Loss	(Belarus) Alexei Kudin	W.A.K.O World Championships 2009, K-1 Semi Finals + 91 kg kg	Villach, Austria			
Wins W.A.K.O. World Championship '09 K-1 Bronze Medal + 91 kg kg.
2008-11-30	Win	(France) Sidi Kone	W.A.K.O. European Championships 2008, Low Kick Final -86 kg	Porto, Portugal	KO		
Wins 2008 W.A.K.O. European Championship Low Kick Gold Medal -86 kg.
2008-11-?	Win	(Croatia) Marijo Valentić	W.A.K.O. European Championships 2008, Low Kick Semi Finals -86 kg	Porto, Portugal	Decision (Unanimous)	3	2:00
2008-11-?	Win	(Portugal) Bruno Susano	W.A.K.O. European Championships 2008, Low Kick Quarter Finals -86 kg	Porto, Portugal	Decision (Unanimous)	3	2:00
2007-09-?	Loss	(Azerbaijan) Rail Rajabov	W.A.K.O World Championships 2007, Low-Kick 1st Round -81 kg	Belgrade, Serbia	Decision (Split)	3	2:00
Legend: Win Loss Draw/No contest Notes

== See also ==
- List of WAKO Amateur World Championships
- List of WAKO Amateur European Championships
- List of male kickboxers
