= W.A.K.O. World Championships 2013 =

W.A.K.O. World Championships 2013 may refer to:

- W.A.K.O. World Championships (Guarujá) 2013
- W.A.K.O. World Championships (Antalya) 2013
