= Stevan Živković =

Serbian kickboxer (born 1988)

- Born: Stevan Živković; January 2, 1988 (age 38); Niš, SR Serbia, SFR Yugoslavia
- Nationality: Serbian
- Height: 1.83 m (6 ft 0 in)
- Weight: 81 kg (179 lb; 12 st 11 lb)
- Division: Welterweight
- Style: Kickboxing
- Stance: Orthodox
- Fighting out of: Niš, Serbia
- Team: KBK "Naissus"
- Trainer: Srdjan Radulovic

Kickboxing record
- Total: 34
- Wins: 25
- By knockout: 7
- Losses: 9

Stevan Živković (born January 2, 1988) is a Serbian welterweight kickboxer.

== Biography and career ==
After winning the silver medal at the WAKO European Championship '10 he challenged French, Frederik Fise for WAKO Pro European Full-Contact Rules Middleweight Title in France on 28 May 2011, losing the fight via TKO in round 6, though leading on scoring cards until then.

Following his silver medal at W.A.K.O. World Championship '11 he got another opportunity to revanche Khasan Khaliev for WAKO Pro World Low-Kick Rules Middleweight Title in Grozny, Russia on 14 January 2012. He lost the fight by points just like in World Championship final.

Being the member of Serbian national team, he fought at WAKO Pro World Grand Prix. Started tournament with a loss due to a cut in quarter finals to Nikos Papadimitriou, but then scored two victories against Mihai Barbu and Konstantin Serebrianikov at the final on 16 June 2012 in Belgrade. Following those victories Serbia won the tournament.

In 2013 he scored two decision victories in Final Fight Championship promotion, on 25 October surprising victory over Miran Fabjan in -81 kg category at FFC08: Zelg vs. Rodriguez, and victory over Grega Smole in -77 category at FFC09: McSweeney vs. Traunmuller in Ljubljana, Slovenia on 15 November.

== Titles ==
=== Kickboxing ===
- Professional
  - 2015 WAKO Pro European Low-Kick Rules Super Middleweight Champion -78.1 kg
  - 2012 Wins WAKO Pro World Grand Prix 2011 championship (As member of Serbian national team)
- Amateur
  - 2013 W.A.K.O. World Championship (bronze) -81 kg (Low-kick rules)
  - 2013 Serbia Open Cup Champion -81 kg (K-1 rules)
  - 2012 W.A.K.O. European Championship (silver) -75 kg (Low-kick rules)
  - 2012 Serbia Open Cup Champion -75 kg (K-1 rules)
  - 2011 W.A.K.O. World Championship (silver) -75 kg (Low-kick rules)
  - 2010 W.A.K.O. European Championship (silver) -75 kg (Low-kick rules)
  - 2010 Serbia Open Cup Champion -75 kg (K-1 rules)
  - 2007,8,9,10,11,12 Serbian Kickboxing Champion (Low-Kick, Full-Contact and K-1 Rules)

== Kickboxing record ==
Professional kickboxing record
25 wins (7 (T)KO's), 9 loss
Date	Result	Opponent	Event	Location	Method	Round	Time
2015-11-27	Loss	(Netherlands) Eyevan Dunnenberg	FFC21: Rijeka	Rijeka, Croatia	Decision (Unanimous)	3	3:00
2015-09-18	Win	(Austria) Henry Bannert	FFC 19 - Linz	Linz, Austria	TKO	2	2:00
2015-06-19	Win	(Spain) Angel Valdivielso	Naissus Fight Night	Niš, Serbia	Decision (Majority)	5	3:00
Wins WAKO Pro European Low-Kick Rules Super Middleweight Title -78.1 kg.
2015-04-11	Win	(Spain) Manuel Romero	Emil Frey Fighting Challenge	Martigny, Switzerland	Decision (Unanimous)	3	3:00
2014-12-06	Loss	(Armenia) Grigor Ashughbabyan	FFC 16: Vienna	Vienna, Austria	Decision (Unanimous)	3	3:00
2014-04-04	Loss	(Albania) Shkodran Veseli	FFC11: Jurković vs. Kaluđerović	Osijek, Croatia	KO (Flying knee)	3	1:14
2014-03-19	Win	(France) Cheick Sidibé	Tatneft Arena World Cup 2014 4th selection 1/8 final (-81 kg)	Kazan, Russia	Ext. R. Decision	4	3:00
2013-11-15	Win	(Slovenia) Grega Smole	FFC09: McSweeney vs. Traunmuller	Ljubljana, Slovenia	Decision (Unanimous)	3	3:00
2013-10-25	Win	(Slovenia) Miran Fabjan	FFC08: Zelg vs. Rodriguez	Zagreb, Croatia	Decision (Split)	3	3:00
2013-04-13	Win	(Slovenia) Ales Zavec	Enfusion Live 4	Novo Mesto, Slovenia	Decision (Unanimous)	3	3:00
2012-12-09	Win	(Croatia) Ivan Stupalo	Supreme FC	Belgrade, Serbia	Decision (Unanimous)	3	3:00
2012-06-16	Win	(Russia) Konstantin Serebrianikov	W.A.K.O. Pro WGP Serbia vs Russia, final	Belgrade, Serbia	Decision (Majority)	3	3:00
Serbia wins WAKO Pro World Grand Prix 2011 championship.
2012-03-17	Loss	(France) Karim Ghajji	Boxe in défi XIII, Tournament, Semi Final	Muret, France	Decision	3	2:00
2012-01-14	Loss	(Russia) Khasan Khaliev	W5	Grozny, Russia	Decision	5	3:00
For WAKO Pro World Low-Kick Rules Middleweight Title -75 kg.
2011-09-16	Win	(Romania) Mihai Barbu	W.A.K.O. Pro WGP Romania vs Serbia, Semi Finals	Bucharest, Romania	Decision	3	3:00
2011-05-28	Loss	(France) Frederik Fise		France	TKO (Ref. Stoppage)	6	
For WAKO Pro European Full-Contact Rules Middleweight Title -75 kg.
2011-03-05	Loss	(Greece) Nikos Papadimitriou	W.A.K.O. Pro WGP Serbia vs Greece, Quarter Finals	Belgrade, Serbia	TKO (Cut)	2	
2010-02-13	Win	(North Macedonia) Ile Risteski	Međunarodna Kick Boks Revija	Zubin Potok, Serbia	KO	2	

Amateur Kickboxing Record
Date	Result	Opponent	Event	Location	Method	Round	Time
2013-10-03	Loss	(Mauritius) James Veejaye Agathe	W.A.K.O World Championships 2013, Low-Kick Semi Finals -81 kg	Guaruja, Brasil	Decision (Unanimous)	3	2:00
Wins W.A.K.O. World Championship '13 Low-Kick Bronze Medal -81 kg.
2013-10-03	Win	(Brazil) Thiago Michel Pereira Silva	W.A.K.O World Championships 2013, Low-Kick Quarter Finals -81 kg	Guaruja, Brasil	Decision (Unanimous)	3	2:00
2013-10-01	Win	(Russia) Evgeny Gubar	W.A.K.O World Championships 2013, Low-Kick 1st Round -81 kg	Guaruja, Brasil	Decision (Split)	3	2:00
2013-02-24	Win	(Serbia) Miljan Vidović	4. Serbia Open Cup 2013, Final	Belgrade, Serbia	Decision (Split)	3	2:00
Wins Serbia Open Cup -81 kg.
2013-02-23	Win	(Serbia) Jasmin Musa	4. Serbia Open Cup 2013, Semi Finals	Belgrade, Serbia	Decision (Unanimous)	3	2:00
2013-02-23	Win	(Serbia) Nemanja Pantelić	4. Serbia Open Cup 2013, Quarter Finals	Belgrade, Serbia	Decision (Unanimous)	3	2:00
2012-11-02	Loss	(Russia) Khasan Khaliev	W.A.K.O European Championships 2012, Low-Kick Final -75 kg	Ankara, Turkey	Decision (Unanimous)	3	2:00
Wins W.A.K.O. European Championship '12 Low-Kick Silver Medal -75 kg.
2012-11-01	Win	(Bulgaria) Sergei Alekxandrov	W.A.K.O European Championships 2012, Low-Kick Semi Finals -75 kg	Ankara, Turkey	Decision (Unanimous)	3	2:00
2012-11-01	Win	(Ukraine) Oleksandr Medvedyev	W.A.K.O European Championships 2012, Low-Kick Quarter Finals -75 kg	Ankara, Turkey	Decision (Split)	3	2:00
2012-02-26	Win	(Serbia) Miljan Vidović	3. Serbia Open Cup 2012, Final	Belgrade, Serbia	Decision (Unanimous)	3	2:00
Wins Serbia Open Cup -75 kg.
2012-02-26	Win	(Serbia) Miloš Mihaljević	3. Serbia Open Cup 2012, Semi Finals	Belgrade, Serbia	Decision (Unanimous)	3	2:00
2012-02-25	Win	(Serbia) Marko Dragović	3. Serbia Open Cup 2012, Quarter Finals	Belgrade, Serbia	Decision (Unanimous)	3	2:00
2011-10-29	Loss	(Russia) Khasan Khaliev	W.A.K.O World Championships 2011, Low-Kick Final -75 kg	Skopje, Macedonia	Decision (Unanimous)	3	2:00
Wins W.A.K.O. World Championship '11 Low-Kick Silver Medal -75 kg.
2011-10-28	Win	(France) Samba Bosar	W.A.K.O World Championships 2011, Low-Kick Semi Finals -75 kg	Skopje, Macedonia	Decision (Unanimous)	3	2:00
2011-10-27	Win	(Poland) Bartosz Ozarek	W.A.K.O World Championships 2011, Low-Kick Quarter Finals -75 kg	Skopje, Macedonia	Decision (Unanimous)	3	2:00
2011-10-26	Win	(Kazakhstan) Baburzhan Artykbaev	W.A.K.O World Championships 2011, Low-Kick 1st Round -75 kg	Skopje, Macedonia	Decision (Unanimous)	3	2:00
2010-10	Loss	(France) Samba Bosar	W.A.K.O European Championships 2010, Low-Kick Semi Finals -75 kg	Baku, Azerbaijan	Decision (Split)	3	2:00
Wins W.A.K.O. European Championship '10 Low-Kick Silver Medal -75 kg.
2010-10	Win	(Italy) Andrea Andrenacci	W.A.K.O European Championships 2010, Low-Kick Semi Finals -75 kg	Baku, Azerbaijan	Decision (Unanimous)	3	2:00
2010-10	Win	(Bulgaria) Sharey Pachinsky	W.A.K.O European Championships 2010, Low-Kick Quarter Finals -75 kg	Baku, Azerbaijan	Decision (Unanimous)	3	2:00
2010-10	Win	(Azerbaijan) Kamil Sharufov	W.A.K.O European Championships 2010, Low-Kick 1st Round -75 kg	Baku, Azerbaijan	Decision (Unanimous)	3	2:00
2010-01-31	Win	(Serbia) Mioš Mhaljević	Serbia Open Cup 2010, Final	Belgrade, Serbia	Decision (Split)	3	2:00
Wins Serbia Open Cup -75 kg.
2010-01-30	Win	(Bulgaria) Vasil Mihailov	Serbia Open Cup 2010, Semi Finals	Belgrade, Serbia	Decision (Split)	3	2:00
2010-01-30	Win	(Serbia) Marjan Antić	Serbia Open Cup 2010, Quarter Finals	Belgrade, Serbia	KO	3	
Legend: Win Loss Draw/No contest Notes

== See also ==
- List of WAKO Amateur World Championships
- List of WAKO Amateur European Championships
- List of male kickboxers
