= Soslan Asbarov =

Russian boxer

Personal information
- Nationality: Russian
- Born: 29 April 1992 (age 34) Chapayevo, Russia
- Height: 6 ft 2 in (188 cm)
- Weight: Cruiserweight

Boxing career
- Stance: Orthodox

Boxing record
- Total fights: 5
- Wins: 4
- Win by KO: 1
- No contests: 1

Soslan Asbarov (born 29 April 1992) is a Russian professional boxer who competes at cruiserweight.

== Amateur career ==
Asbarov had over 250 amateur fights and obtained the title Master of Sports of International Class.

== Professional career ==
Asbarov fought American Brandon Glanton in Dubai on 18 March 2023 and despite being an underdog, Asbarov managed to overpower his opponent to win via majority decision.

On 15 April 2024, Asbarov was handed a six-year suspension from boxing by the Russian Anti-Doping Agency (RUSADA), following test results from his 28 October 2023 bout with Alexei Papin coming back positive for an unspecified banned substance. Asbarov's unanimous decision win over Papin was changed to a no contest.

== Professional boxing record ==
5 fights	4 wins	0 losses
By knockout	1	0
By decision	3	0
No contests	1	

No.	Result	Record	Opponent	Type	Round, time	Date	Location	Notes
5	NC	4–0 (1)	Alexei Papin	NC	10	28 Oct 2023	CSKA Arena, Moscow, Russia	Originally a UD win for Asbarov, later ruled a NC after a failed drug test
4	Win	4–0	Brandon Glanton	MD	10	18 Mar 2023	Agenda Arena, Dubai, United Arab Emirates	
3	Win	3–0	Joel Shojgreen	TKO	1 (8), 1:00	19 Mar 2023	Moscow, Russia	
2	Win	2–0	Dmitry Kudryashov	UD	8	24 Sep 2022	Moscow, Russia	
1	Win	1–0	Oleg Fomichev	MD	4	11 Jun 2022	Irina Viner Gymnastics Palace, Moscow, Russia	
