= Agron Preteni =

Croatian Cruiserweight kickboxer (born 1990)

- Born: Agron Preteni; November 11, 1990 (age 35); Split, SR Croatia, SFR Yugoslavia
- Nationality: Croatian
- Height: 1.82 m (5 ft 11 1/2 in)
- Weight: 90.1 kg (199 lb; 14 st 3 lb)
- Division: Cruiserweight
- Style: Savate, Kickboxing
- Team: Pit Bull Split
- Trainer: Marko Žaja

Kickboxing record
- Total: 27
- Wins: 21
- By knockout: 7
- Losses: 5
- By knockout: 1
- Draws: 1

Amateur record
- Total: 57
- Wins: 47
- Losses: 10
- Last updated on: November 8, 2013

Agron Preteni (born 1990 in Split) is a Croatian Cruiserweight kickboxer.

== Biography and career ==
Preteni is the best fighter in junior category in his Pit Bull gym but also in Croatia. He has won many international titles, in 2006 Agron was 3rd on W.A.K.O. Kickboxing world championship, low-kick rules in Zadar, Croatia, In 2007 W.A.K.O. European kickboxing champion in Portugal, then in 2008 W.A.K.O. world champion on world championship in Naples and in the same year 5th on world championship in boxing held in Mexico City, where according to many people he was better fighter, and undeservedly lost in quarter finals. 18 years old Agron also became world champion in savate held in Novi Sad, Serbia as super heavyweight, knocking out Serbian fighter Ivo Debelić in the finals as he was standing 2.03 m tall and 110 kg heavy.

He was also successful as professional and senior amateur kickboxer. In 2010 he became K-1 Collizion Croatia champion, defeating much more experienced James Phillips in the finals. On the same year he participated W.A.K.O. senior European championship held in Loutraki, Greece, winning bronze medal.

In 2011 he went to Dakar to fight Boubacar N'Diaye for W.F.K.B. K-1 rules world title. He won the title in round 2 due to injury, leg of Boubacar was broken while Agron blocked a kick. Both bones below the knee, fibula and tibia were broken.

Preteni won silver medal on W.A.K.O. European Championships in -91 kg category held in Ankara, Turkey on November 2, 2012. He won silver medal beating one of the best Russian fighter Alexey Papin in the semi-finals, then went to the finals with influenza and lost to best Serbian fighter and numerous W.A.K.O. champion Nenad Pagonis via unanimous decision.

He defeated Andrei Stoica via unanimous decision in a non-tournament bout at the K-1 World Grand Prix FINAL in Zagreb, Croatia on March 15, 2013. The fight was all Stoica, until Preteni dropped him with a left hook early in the second round which earned an eight count and really turned the tide of the fight. Mladen Krajnčec, one of the judges said that this was hardest fight to judge and that K-1 rules clearly state that the one who is in a knockdown loses the fight.

It was announced that Preteni will fight on March 23, 2013, at the Obračun u Ringu 11 event versus Zeki Tezer if he rehabilitates minor shoulder injuries suffered in fight against Andrei Stoica. If not he would be replaced by Toni Čatipović. However Preteni could not fight and as announced was replaced by teammate Čatipović. At the end of the fight Preteni gave him the winning trophy. He was also scheduled to fight Mamadou Keta at Final Fight 3: Jurković vs. Cătinaș in Split, Croatia on April 19, 2013, but because of same injury he had to cancel the fight.

It was a replay of last years European championship as Preteni won silver medal on W.A.K.O. World Championships in -91 kg category also losing to Nenad Pagonis by unanimous decision.

He rematched Andrei Stoica at Legend 2: Invasion in Moscow, Russia on November 9, 2013, in a reserve bout of Legend Fighting Show -95 kg tournament. Preteni took a majority judges decision in a close fight with many strong kicks and punches which did little damage. As Zabit Samedov got injured Preteni advanced to the final where he faced veteran of the sport Pavel Zhuravlev. First round was equal but at the beginning of second Zhuravlev showed what's he made of and after two knockdowns gain TKO victory, title and cheque of $100,000.

He was expected to face Luis Tavares for vacant International Kickboxing Association K1 rules heavyweight world championship at Kickboxing Elite promotion event in Las Vegas, Nevada, on March 8, 2014. However Preteni was replaced with Hicham Achalhi because he couldn't get work permit.

== Titles ==
Professional

- 2016 W5 European Champion -86 kg
- 2013 Legend Fighting Show -95 kg Tournament Runner-up
- 2011 W.F.K.B. World K-1 Rules Champion −95 kg
- 2010 K-1 Collizion Croatia Champion

Amateur

- 2013 - W.A.K.O. World Championships in Guaruja, Brasil (silver) −91 kg (Low-Kick rules)
- 2012 - W.A.K.O. European Championships in Ankara, Turkey (silver) −91 kg (Low-Kick rules)
- 2010 - W.A.K.O. European Championships in Loutraki, Greece (bronze) −91 kg (Full contact rules)
- 2009 - World junior savate championship in Novi Sad, Serbia (gold)
- 2008 – 5th place on a World Junior Championship of Boxing AIBA in Mexico City
- 2008 – W.A.K.O. World Junior Championship in Naples, Italy (gold) -86 kg (Low-Kick rules)
- 2007 - W.A.K.O. European Junior Championship in Faro, Portugal (gold) -81 kg (Low-Kick rules)
- 2006 – W.A.K.O. World Junior Championship in Zadar, Croatia (bronze) (Low-Kick rules),

== Kickboxing record ==
Professional Kickboxing Record
21 Wins (7 (T)KO's), 5 Loss (1 (T)KO's), 1 Draw
Date	Result	Opponent	Event	Location	Method	Round	Time
2017-04-29	Loss	(Tunisia) Yousri Belgaroui	Glory 40: Copenhagen, Semi-final	Copenhagen, Denmark	Decision (unanimous)	3	3:00
2017-02-26	Win	(Bosnia and Herzegovina) Muhamed Mahmić	Noć Gladijatora	Čapljina, BIH	TKO (Low kicks)	1	
2016-12-03	Loss	(Russia) Timur Aylyarov	K-1 WGP Euro 2016 -85kg Championship Tournament, Semi-final	Tuzla, BIH	Decision (Unanimous)	3	3:00
2016-12-03	Win	(Spain) Imanol Rodríguez	K-1 WGP Euro 2016 -85kg Championship Tournament, Quarter-final	Tuzla, BIH	Decision (Unanimous)	3	3:00
2016-06-04	Win	(Romania) Bogdan Năstase	W5 European League XXXIV	Zagreb, Croatia	Decision (unanimous)	5	3:00
Wins the vacant W5 European Championship -86 kg.
2016-05-21	Win	(Albania) Labinot Zekaj	It's W5 Time XXXIII	Vienna, Austria	KO	2	
2015-06-24	Win	(Montenegro) Mitar Nikolov	Obračun u Podstrani VI	Podstrana, Croatia	TKO (low kick)	2	
2015-05-30	Draw	(Bosnia and Herzegovina) Denis Marjanović	Obračun u Ringu 13	Split, Croatia	Draw	3	3:00
Dropped to middleweight -85 kg.
2014-12-18	Loss	(Serbia) Nenad Pagonis	SOUL Night of Champions	Novi Sad, Serbia	Decision (unanimous)	5	3:00
For vacant WAKO Pro World Low-Kick Rules Heavyweight Title -88,6 kg.
2013-11-08	Loss	(Ukraine) Pavel Zhuravlev	Legend 2: Invasion, Final	Moscow, Russia	TKO (left hook)	2	0:46
For Legend Fighting Show -95 kg Tournament Title.
2013-11-08	Win	(Romania) Andrei Stoica	Legend 2: Invasion, Reserve bout	Moscow, Russia	Decision (Majority)	3	3:00
2013-03-15	Win	(Romania) Andrei Stoica	K-1 World Grand Prix FINAL in Zagreb, Super Fight	Zagreb, Croatia	Decision (Unanimous)	3	3:00
2012-03-10	Win	(France) Pacome Assi	Cro Cop Final Fight	Zagreb, Croatia	Decision (Majority)	3	3:00
2011-10-22	Win	(Senegal) Boubacar N'Diaye	Championnat D'Afrique Pro	Dakar, Senegal	TKO (Broken leg)	2	
Wins WFKB World K-1 Rules Championship −95 kg.
2011-04-30	Win	(Italy) Umberto Lucci		Milan, Italy	KO (Left high kick)	2	
2011-04-10	Win	(Italy) Fabia Giannasio		Santeramo in Colle, Italia	Decision	3	3:00
2011-02-05	Loss	(Turkey) Yuksel Ayaydin	Fight Code: Rhinos Series, Final 16 (Part 1)	Nitra, Slovakia	Decision	3	3:00
2010-07-09	Win	(Slovenia) Franci Grajš	Mega Fight	Umag, Croatia	Decision	3	3:00
2010-12-17	Win	(Serbia) Jovan Kaluđerović	Splendid Grand Prix 2010	Budva, Montenegro	Decision	3	3:00
2010-8-17	Win	(Chile) Juan Hector	SKB Fight Night	Budva, Montenegro	Decision	3	3:00
2010–06-04	Win	(France) Pacome Assi	Nitrianska Noc Bojovnikov - Ring of Honor	Nitra, Slovakia	Decision (Unanimous)	3	3:00
2010-03-27	Win	(Germany) James Phillips	Obračun u ringu 10, final	Split, Croatia	Decision (Unanimous)	3	3:00
Wins K-1 ColliZion 2010 Croatia Heavyweight Tournament Title.
2010-03-27	Win	(Austria) Henry Bannert	Obračun u ringu 10, quarter finals	Split, Croatia	KO	2	1:32
2009-08-07	Win	(Italy) Gian Marco Zarolli	Oluja u ringu III	Hvar, Croatia	Decision (unanimous)	3	3:00
2009-05-26	Win	(Bosnia and Herzegovina) Muamer Tufekčić	Konačni Obračun	Podgorica, Montenegro	Decision (unanimous)	3	2:00
2009-03-22	Win	(Croatia) Toni Milanović	Obračun u ringu 9	Split, Croatia	Decision (unanimous)	3	3:00
2008-05-11	Win	(Bosnia and Herzegovina) Josip Semren	Obračun u Ringu 8	Zadar, Croatia	KO	1	
Full contact bout 3x2.

Amateur Kickboxing Record (Notable Fights Only)
47 Wins, 10 Losses
Date	Result	Opponent	Event	Location	Method	Round	Time
2013-10-04	Loss	(Serbia) Nenad Pagonis	W.A.K.O World Championships 2013, Low-Kick Final -91 kg	Guaruja, Brasil	Decision (Unanimous)	3	2:00
Wins W.A.K.O. World Championship '13 Low-Kick Silver Medal -91 kg.
2013-10-03	Win	(Kazakhstan) Zakhar Vorobey	W.A.K.O World Championships 2013, Low-Kick Semi-finals -91 kg	Guaruja, Brasil	Decision (Unanimous)	3	2:00
2013-10-03	Win	(Georgia (country)) Zurab Besiashvili	W.A.K.O World Championships 2013, Low-Kick Quarter-finals -91 kg	Guaruja, Brasil	Decision (Unanimous)	3	2:00
2012-11-02	Loss	(Serbia) Nenad Pagonis	W.A.K.O European Championships 2012, Low-Kick Final -91 kg	Ankara, Turkey	Decision (Unanimous)	3	2:00
Wins W.A.K.O. European Championship '12 Low-Kick Silver Medal -91 kg.
2012-11-01	Win	(Russia) Alexei Papin	W.A.K.O European Championships 2012, Low-Kick Semi-finals -91 kg	Ankara, Turkey	Decision (unanimous)	3	2:00
2012-10-31	Win	(Romania) Dănuț Hurduc	W.A.K.O European Championships 2012, Low-Kick Quarter-finals -91 kg	Ankara, Turkey	Decision (unanimous)	3	2:00
2010-11-25	Loss	(Poland) Denis Simkin	W.A.K.O European Championships 2010, Full contact Semi-finals -91 kg	Loutraki, Greece	Decision (Split)	3	2:00
Wins W.A.K.O. European Championship '10 Full contact Bronze Medal -91 kg.
2010-11-24	Win	(Poland) Tomasz Duszak	W.A.K.O European Championships 2010, Full contact Quarter-finals -91 kg	Loutraki, Greece	Decision (Unanimous)	3	2:00
2010-11-22	Win	(Italy) Umberto Lucci	W.A.K.O European Championships 2010, Full contact First Round -91 kg	Loutraki, Greece	Decision (Unanimous)	3	2:00
2008-09	Win	(Croatia) Toni Milanović	W.A.K.O Junior World Championships 2008, Low-kick Final -86 kg	Naples, Italy	Decision (Unanimous)	3	2:00
Wins W.A.K.O. Junior World Championship '08 Low-kick Gold Medal -86 kg.
2008-09	Win	(Kazakhstan) Diyar Seitov	W.A.K.O Junior World Championships 2008, Low-kick Semi-finals -86 kg	Naples, Italy	Decision (Unanimous)	3	2:00
2008-02-02	Win	(Croatia) Josip Semern	Croatian Junior Kickboxing Championship, K-1 Final -86 kg	Imotski, Croatia			
Wins Croatian Junior Kickboxing Championship K-1 Gold Medal -86 kg.
2008-03-22	Loss	(Croatia) Marin Roso	Croatian Kickboxing Championship, Full-contact Final -86 kg	Split, Croatia			
Wins Croatian Kickboxing Championship Full-Contact Silver Medal -86 kg.
2008-03-22	Win	(Croatia) Stipe Stipetić	Croatian Kickboxing Championship, Full-contact Semi-finals -86 kg	Split, Croatia			
2008-02-02	Win	(Croatia) Filip Zovko	Croatian Junior Kickboxing Championship, Low-kick Final -86 kg	Split, Croatia			
Wins Croatian Junior Kickboxing Championship Low-kick Gold Medal -86 kg.
2008-02-02	Win	(Croatia) Filip Perica	Croatian Junior Kickboxing Championship, Low-kick Semi-finals -86 kg	Split, Croatia			
2007-11	Win	(Russia) Kurban Magamedov	W.A.K.O Junior European Championships 2007, Low-kick Final -81 kg	Faro, Portugal			
Wins W.A.K.O. Junior European Championship '07 Low-kick Gold Medal -81 kg.
2007-11	Win	(Portugal) Valter Monteiro	W.A.K.O Junior European Championships 2007, Low-kick Semi-finals -81 kg	Faro, Portugal			
2007-09-16	Loss	(Bosnia and Herzegovina) Almin Hopovac	Za Svjetlo, Low-kick -81 kg	Sukošan, Croatia	Decision (Split)	3	2:00
Legend: Win Loss Draw/No contest Notes

== See also ==
- List of WAKO Amateur World Championships
- List of WAKO Amateur European Championships
- List of K-1 champions
- List of K-1 events
- List of male kickboxers
