= Yang Gang =

Yang Gang may refer to:

- Yang Gang (journalist) (1905–1957), Chinese journalist
- Yang Gang (politician) (born 1953), Chinese politician
- Yang Gang, art director for the film Red Sorghum (film)
- Yang Gang, character in Painted Skin (TV series)
- Yang Gang or #YangGang, supporters of Andrew Yang and his 2020 presidential campaign
- Yanggang Province or Ryanggang Province, a province in North Korea

== See also ==
- Yang Guang (disambiguation)
