= James Veejaye Agathe =

Mauritian kickboxer (born 1983)

- Born: May 15, 1983 (age 43); Rodrigues, Mauritius
- Nationality: (Mauritius) Mauritian
- Weight: 81.0 kg (178.6 lb; 12.76 st)
- Style: kickboxing
- Team: Fédération Mauricienne de Kickboxing

Other information
- Occupation: Special Mobile Force

James Veejaye Agathe (born May 15, 1983) is a Mauritian kickboxer from Rodrigues island who won the 2013 World Champion title in the -81 kg category at the World Association of Kickboxing Organisations (W.A.K.O) Senior World Championships (low kick, K-1), held in Guarujá, São Paulo, Brazil

He was awarded Sportsman of the Year and a cash prize of Rs 500,000 ($16,000) from the Government of Mauritius for his incredible performances.

== Mauritian kick boxers ==
Mauritius reaped two gold medals and two silver medals and ranked 6th amidst the 47 participating countries from five continents in these championships. James Veejaye Agathe in the -81 kg category and Fabrice Michel Bauluck in the -54 kg won the World Champion title while Facson Perrine in the -63,5 kg and Burtlan Clifton Mathieu Simiss in the -51 kg won silver medals. Boris Brissonette in the -71 kg category reached the quarter-finals. A cash prize presentation ceremony was held at the Treasury Building in Port Louis to reward those top athletes.

High level grant was accorded to all these sportsman by the government. The new financial allocation grid for the top athletes for the period July to September 2014 was recently approved by sports bodies.
