= Nenad Pagonis =

Serbian kickboxer

- Born: July 28, 1987 (age 39); Novi Sad, SR Serbia, SFR Yugoslavia
- Other names: Greek, Tenshinhan, The Tulip
- Nationality: Serbian
- Height: 1.93 m (6 ft 4 in)
- Weight: 93.9 kg (207 lb; 14.79 st)
- Division: Heavyweight; Cruiserweight; Light Heavyweight
- Reach: 76.0 in (193 cm)
- Style: Muay Thai; Kickboxing
- Stance: Orthodox
- Fighting out of: Amsterdam, Netherlands
- Team: Mike's Gym (2010-present); Pagonis Team (2009-present); Ronin Gym (up to 2009)
- Trainer: Mike Passenier (Mike's Gym); Milos Milutinov (Pagonis Team)

Professional boxing record
- Total: 9
- Wins: 8
- By knockout: 6
- Losses: 1
- By knockout: 1
- Draws: 0

Kickboxing record
- Total: 12
- Wins: 9
- By knockout: 4
- Losses: 3
- By knockout: 2

Amateur kickboxing record
- Total: 67
- Wins: 62
- By knockout: 34
- Losses: 5

Other information
- Boxing record from BoxRec
- Last updated on: November 23, 2013

Nenad Pagonis (Serbian Cyrillic: Ненад Пагонис; born 28 July 1987) is a Serbian cruiserweight kickboxer as of 2013 fighting out of Mike's Gym in Amsterdam, Netherlands and Team Pagonis in Novi Sad, Serbia. In 2010 he became W.A.K.O. Pro world champion (K-1 rules). He won a number of world and European titles at amateur level.

== Biography and career ==
Pagonis is of Greek paternal descent. In 2006, at the age of 19, he won a gold medal at the yearly Balkan Games, and won gold at the W.A.K.O. European championships held in Macedonia. From 2007 to 2009 he won two world championships, two world cups and a further Balkans championship.

In 2010 Pagonis became professional, and won the W.A.K.O Pro world title against reigning champion Antonio Sousa, winning by a third round stoppage victory in Milan Sousa was knocked down three times before the referee stopped the fight. Pagonis then joined Mike's Gym in the Netherlands where he trained with fighters including Badr Hari and Melvin Manhoef. Pagonis has now won a world title 8 times (4 amateur titles, 4 professional title) and has won 3 European titles. Pagonis also appeared on It's Showtime in Athens in 2010, where he defeated Rustemi Kreshnik by decision, allowing him to challenge the reigning It's Showtime 95MAX champion Danyo Ilunga the following year.

A planned fight on December 9, 2012 under the newly formed Serbian "Supreme Fighting Championship" organisation did not take place after Pagonis was injured.

He lost to Artem Vakhitov by unanimous decision on the Glory 12: New York undercard in New York City on November 23, but that decision was questionable.

Beside his professional boxing career, he is the founder and the lead vocalist of the Serbian rock band Black Peacock (due to legal issues, the band changed its name to Black Peacock from Jurassic Rock, from his last name, which means peacock in Greek). Pagonis performs with the band manly covers of acclaimed songs by AC/DC, Deep Purple, Eagles and Judas Priest at various festivals around the Vojvodina region and Novi Sad, including the humanitarian Atina and Oktobar fest. Other than that, his music career includes the participation in the fourth season of the Serbian version of Your Face Sounds Familiar. In exact order, he imitated: Luis Fonsi (10th place), Axl Rose of Guns N' Roses (3rd place), Šaban Šaulić (3rd place), Jelena Karleuša (6th place), Marc Anthony (1st place), Harry Styles (8th place), Robbie Williams (8th place), Conchita Wurst (10th place), Lenny Kravitz (9th place), Đorđe Balašević (10th place) and Brian Johnson of AC/DC (2nd place). In the final, he claimed 8th place out of 10. In 2019, he published an autobiographical novel titled "In the ring of life".

== Titles ==
Professional

- 2014 W.A.K.O. Pro World Low Kick Rules Heavyweight champion -88.61 kg
- 2013 W.A.K.O. Pro cruiser heavyweight world champion -94.1 kg (Low Kick Rules)
- 2012 Wins WAKO Pro World Grand Prix 2011 championship (As member of Serbian national team)
- 2012 W.K.B.F. K-1 Rules International Super heavyweight Championship +95 kg
- 2010 W.A.K.O. Pro heavyweight world champion -88.6 kg (K-1 Rules)

Amateur

- 2015 W.A.K.O. World Championships in Belgrade, Serbia (gold) −91 kg (K-1 rules)
- 2014 W.A.K.O. European Championships in Bilbao, Spain (silver) −91 kg (Low-Kick rules)
- 2013 W.A.K.O. World Championships in Guaruja, Brasil (gold) −91 kg (Low-Kick rules)
- 2012 W.A.K.O. European Championships in Ankara, Turkey (gold) −91 kg (Low-Kick rules)
- 2011 W.A.K.O. World Championships in Skopje, Macedonia (gold) -91 kg (K-1 Rules)
- 2010 Serbia Open Cup Champion -86 kg (K-1 Rules)
- 2009 W.A.K.O. World Championships in Villach, Austria (gold) -86 kg (K-1 Rules)
- 2009 W.A.K.O. World Cup in Szeged, Hungary (gold) -86 kg (K-1 Rules)
- 2008 W.A.K.O. European Championships in Oporto, Portugal (gold) −86 kg (K-1 rules)
- 2008 W.A.K.O. Balkans Championships in Ohrid, Macedonia (gold) -86 kg (K-1 Rules)
- 2008 W.A.K.O. World Cup in Szeged, Hungary (gold) -86 kg (K-1 Rules)
- 2007 W.A.K.O. World Championships in Belgrade, Serbia (gold) -81 kg (Low-Kick)
- 2007 W.A.K.O. World Cup in Szeged, Hungary (gold) -81 kg (Low-Kick)
- 2006 W.A.K.O. European Championships in Skopje, Macedonia (gold) -81 kg (Low-Kick)
- 2006 W.A.K.O. Balkans Championships in Burgas, Bulgaria (gold) -81 kg (Low-Kick)

== Boxing record ==
8 Wins (6 knockouts, 2 decisions), 0 Losses, 0 Draws
Res.	Record	Opponent	Type	Rd., Time	Date	Location	Notes
Loss	8-1	(Germany) Nikola Milacic	TKO	3 (12), 1:22	2018-03-24	(Serbia) Small hall SPENS Novi Sad	
Win	8-0	(Georgia (country)) Davit Gorgiladze	TKO	1, 3:00	2017-12-23	(Germany) Boxhalle Marzahn Berlin	
Win	7-0	(Germany) Bjorn Blaschke	TKO	5, 3:00	2017-10-28	(Germany) Federbachhalle Malsch, Karlsruhe	
Win	6-0	(Germany) Muhammed Ali Durmaz	KO	1, 3:00	2017-09-30	(Germany) Sport and Congress Center Schwerin	
Win	5-0	(Romania) Giulian Ilie	PTS	8, 3:00	2017-03-04	(Germany) Camp 1, Berlin	
Win	4-0	(Czech Republic) Vladimir Reznicek	SD	8, 3:00	2016-11-26	(Germany) Boxcamp P1, Hellersdorf, Berlin	
Win	3-0	(Turkey) Ata Dogan	RTD	4 (6), 3:00	2016-08-27	(Germany) Huxleys, Kreuzberg, Berlin	
Win	2-0	(Czech Republic) Robert Cervenak	TKO	1 (6), 1:58	2016-05-13	(Germany) Camp 1, Berlin	
Win	1-0	(Hungary) George Ubah	KO	4 (6), 1:05	2016-01-09	(Germany) Maritim Hotel, Tiergarten, Berlin	Professional debut.

== Kickboxing record ==
Professional kickboxing record
9 Wins (4 (T)KO's), 3 Loss
Date	Result	Opponent	Event	Location	Method	Round	Time
2014-12-18	Win	(Croatia) Agron Preteni	SOUL Night of Champions	Novi Sad, Serbia	Decision (Unanimous)	5	3:00
Wins vacant WAKO Pro Low Kick Rules Heavyweight World Title -88,6 kg.
2013-11-23	Loss	(Russia) Artem Vakhitov	Glory 12: New York	New York City, New York, USA	Decision (Unanimous)	3	3:00
2013-06-29	Loss	(Russia) Alexei Papin	Martial Arts Festival	Moscow, Russia	TKO (injury)	3	0:00
Lost W.A.K.O. Pro Low Kick rules cruiser heavyweight world title -94.1 kg.
2013-03-09	Win	(Russia) Alexei Papin	Monte Carlo Fighting Masters	Monte Carlo, Monaco	Decision (Split)	3	3:00
Wins W.A.K.O. Pro Low Kick rules cruiser heavyweight world title -94.1 kg.
2012-06-16	Win	(Russia) Kurban Omarov	W.A.K.O. Pro GP Serbia vs Russia, final	Belgrade, Serbia	TKO (retirement)	1	3:00
Serbia wins WAKO Pro World Grand Prix 2011 Championship.
2012-05-18	Win	(New Zealand) Nato Lauuii	Fight Night Sydney	Sydney, Australia	KO	2	
Wins W.K.B.F. K-1 Rules International Super Heavyweight Championship +95 kg.
2011-06-11	Loss	(Democratic Republic of the Congo) Danyo Ilunga	BFN Group presents: It's Showtime Warsaw	Warsaw, Poland	TKO (referee stop)	4	1:13
Fight was for Ilunga's It's Showtime 95 MAX world title -95 kg.
2011-03-05	Win	(Greece) Thanasis Michaloudis	Wako-Pro World Grand Prix 2011: Serbia vs Greece, quarter final	Belgrade, Serbia	KO (punches)	1	1:16
2010-12-11	Win	(Belgium) Rustemi Kreshnik	It's Showtime Athens	Athens, Greece	Decision (Unanimous)	3	3:00
2010-03-20	Win	(Portugal) Antonio Sousa	Kickboxing Superstar XIX	Milan, Italy	TKO (ref stop/3 knockdowns)	3	
Wins Sousa's W.A.K.O. Pro K-1 rules heavyweight world title -88.6 kg.
2009-01-21	Win	(France) Atef Cherif	FFC 2	Casablanca, Morocco	Decision (unanimous)	5	2:00
2007-01-26	Win	(Bulgaria) Krasimir Dimov	Zlatni Kikbokser	Belgrade, Serbia	Decision (Unanimous)	3	3:00

Amateur kickboxing record
60 Wins (34 (T)KO's), 5 Losses
Date	Result	Opponent	Event	Location	Method	Round	Time
2015-10	Win	(Belarus) Piotr Ramankevich	W.A.K.O World Championships 2015, K-1 Final -91 kg	Belgrade, Serbia	Decision (Unanimous)	3	2:00
Wins W.A.K.O. World Championship '15 K-1 Gold Medal -91 kg.
2015-10	Win	(Estonia) Marat Mirzabolaev	W.A.K.O World Championships 2015, K-1 Semi Finals -91 kg	Belgrade, Serbia	Decision (Unanimous)	3	2:00
2015-10	Win	(Azerbaijan) Anar Mammadov	W.A.K.O World Championships 2015, K-1 Quarter Finals -91 kg	Belgrade, Serbia	Decision (Unanimous)	3	2:00
2014-10-24	Loss	(Russia) Basir Abakarov	W.A.K.O European Championships 2014, Low-Kick Final -91 kg	Bilbao, Spain	Decision (Unanimous)	3	2:00
Wins W.A.K.O. European Championship '14 Low-Kick Silver Medal -91 kg.
2014-10-23	Win	(Ukraine) Edgar Sarkisian	W.A.K.O European Championships 2014, Low-Kick Semi Finals -91 kg	Bilbao, Spain	Decision (Unanimous)	3	2:00
2013-10-04	Win	(Croatia) Agron Preteni	W.A.K.O World Championships 2013, Low-Kick Final -91 kg	Guaruja, Brasil	Decision (Unanimous)	3	2:00
Wins W.A.K.O. World Championship '13 Low-Kick Gold Medal -91 kg.
2013-10-03	Win	(Russia) Igor Darmeshkin	W.A.K.O World Championships 2013, Low-Kick Semi Finals -91 kg	Guaruja, Brasil			
2013-10-03	Win	(Turkey) Ferit Karan	W.A.K.O World Championships 2013, Low-Kick Quarter Finals -91 kg	Guaruja, Brasil			
2012-11-02	Win	(Croatia) Agron Preteni	W.A.K.O European Championships 2012, Low-Kick Final -91 kg	Ankara, Turkey	Decision (Unanimous)	3	2:00
Wins W.A.K.O. European Championship '12 Low-Kick Gold Medal -91 kg.
2012-11-01	Win	(Ukraine) Edgar Sarkisian	W.A.K.O European Championships 2012, Low-Kick Semi Finals -91 kg	Ankara, Turkey	Decision (unanimous)	3	2:00
2011-11	Win	(Bosnia and Herzegovina) Bahrudin Mahmić	W.A.K.O World Championships 2011, K-1 Final -91 kg	Skopje, Macedonia	Decision (Unanimous)	3	2:00
Wins W.A.K.O. World Championship '11 K-1 Gold Medal -91 kg.
2011-10	Win	(Russia) Vladimir Mineev	W.A.K.O World Championships 2011, K-1 Semi Finals -91 kg	Skopje, Macedonia	Decision (Unanimous)	3	2:00
2011-10	Win	(Slovakia) Mihal Hromek	W.A.K.O World Championships 2011, K-1 Quarter Finals -91 kg	Skopje, Macedonia	Decision (Unanimous)	3	2:00
2011-10	Win	(Portugal) Luis Morais	W.A.K.O World Championships 2011, K-1 1st Round -91 kg	Skopje, Macedonia	Decision (Unanimous)	3	2:00
2010-10-18	Loss	(Azerbaijan) Zamig Athakishiyev	W.A.K.O European Championships 2010, Low-Kick Quarter Finals -81 kg	Baku, Azerbaijan	KO	3	
2010-01-31	Win	(Serbia) Marko Milinković	Serbia Open Cup 2010, Final	Belgrade, Serbia	Decision (Unanimous)	3	2:00
Wins Serbia Open Cup -86 kg.
2009-10-26	Win	(Belarus) Dzianis Hancharonak	W.A.K.O World Championships 2009, K-1 Final -86 kg	Villach, Austria			
Wins W.A.K.O. World Championship '09 K-1 Gold Medal -86 kg.
2009-10-24	Win	(Russia) Evgeny Ganin	W.A.K.O World Championships 2009, K-1 Semi Finals -86 kg	Villach, Austria			
2008-11	Winn	(Belarus) Dzianis Hancharonak	W.A.K.O European Championships 2008, K-1 Final -86 kg	Porto, Portugal	Decision (Unanimous)	3	2:00
Wins W.A.K.O. European Championship '08 K-1 Silver Medal -86 kg.
2008-11	Win	(Russia) Evgeniy Ganin	W.A.K.O European Championships 2008, K-1 Semi Finals -86 kg	Porto, Portugal	Decision (Unanimous)	3	2:00
2007-09-30	Win	(Azerbaijan) Rail Rajabov	W.A.K.O World Championships 2007, Low-Kick Final -81 kg	Belgrade, Serbia	Decision (Split)	3	2:00
Wins W.A.K.O. World Championship '07 Low-Kick Gold Medal -81 kg.
2007-09-?	Win	(Sweden) Viktor Nordh	W.A.K.O World Championships 2007, Low-Kick Semi Final -81 kg	Belgrade, Serbia	KO		
2007-09-?	Win	(Ukraine) Anatoliy Dyakov	W.A.K.O World Championships 2007, Low-Kick Quarter Finals -81 kg	Belgrade, Serbia	Decision (Unanimous)	3	2:00
2007-09-?	Win	(Bulgaria) Ilijan Kostadinov	W.A.K.O World Championships 2007, Low-Kick 1st Round -81 kg	Belgrade, Serbia	Decision (Unanimous)	3	2:00
2006-11-26	Win	(Bosnia and Herzegovina) Ninic Drazenko	W.A.K.O European Championships 2006, Low-Kick Final -81 kg	Skopje, Macedonia	Decision (Split)	3	2:00
Wins W.A.K.O. European Championship '06 Low-Kick Gold Medal -81 kg.
2006-11-25	Win	(Finland) Teppo Laine	W.A.K.O European Championships 2006, Low-Kick Semi Final -81 kg	Skopje, Macedonia	Decision (Split)	3	2:00
2006-11-24	Win	(Belarus) Aliaksandr Kryvarotau	W.A.K.O European Championships 2006, Low-Kick Quarter Finals -81 kg	Skopje, Macedonia	Decision (Split)	3	2:00
2006-11-23	Win	(Portugal) Leonildo Domingos	W.A.K.O European Championships 2006, Low-Kick 2nd Round -81 kg	Skopje, Macedonia	KO		
Legend: Win Loss Draw/No contest Notes

== See also ==
- List of It's Showtime events
- List of It's Showtime champions
- List of WAKO Amateur World Championships
- List of WAKO Amateur European Championships
- List of male kickboxers
