= Men's Low-Kick at WAKO World Championships 2007 Belgrade -81 kg =

The men's light heavyweight (81-kilogram (179 lb)) Low-Kick category at the W.A.K.O. World Championships 2007 in Belgrade was the fourth-heaviest of the male Low-Kick tournaments, involving seventeen fighters from three continents (Europe, Asia and Africa). Each of the matches was three rounds of two minutes each and were fought under Low-Kick rules.

As there were too few fighters for a tournament of thirty-two, fifteen of the fighters received byes through to the second round. The tournament champion was Serbia's Nenad Pagonis who won the gold by defeating Azerbaijan's Rail Rajabov in the final via split decision. Defeated semi finalists, Dénes Rácz from Hungary and Viktor Nordh from Sweden received bronze medals.

== Results ==
1st Round
(Egypt) Mohamed Esmaeel
(Sweden) Viktor Nordh	D(3:0)

2nd Round
(Hungary) Dénes Rácz	KO
(Turkey) Caner Topal
(Portugal) Leonildo Domingos	D(3:0)
(Italy) Luciano Nubile
(Croatia) Marijo Valentic	D(3:0)
(South Africa) Jeremy Smith
(Russia) Alexey Papin
(Azerbaijan) Rail Rajabov	D(2:1)
(Poland) Maciej Miszkin
(Greece) Veniamin Davidis	D(2:1)
(Iran) Khanjari Ali
(Sweden) Viktor Nordh	D(3:0)
(Ukraine) Anatoliy Dyakov	D(2:1)
(France) David Dumont
(Bulgaria) Ilijan Kostadinov
(Serbia) Nenad Pagonis	D(3:0)

Quarter Finals
(Hungary) Dénes Rácz	D(2:1)
(Portugal) Leonildo Domingos
(Croatia) Marijo Valentic
(Azerbaijan) Rail Rajabov	D(3:0)
(Greece) Veniamin Davidis
(Sweden) Viktor Nordh	D(3:0)
(Ukraine) Anatoliy Dyakov
(Serbia) Nenad Pagonis	D(3:0)

Semi Finals
(Hungary) Dénes Rácz
(Azerbaijan) Rail Rajabov	D(3:0)
(Sweden) Viktor Nordh
(Serbia) Nenad Pagonis	KO

Final
(Azerbaijan) Rail Rajabov
(Serbia) Nenad Pagonis	D(2:1)

=== Key ===
Abbreviation	Meaning
D (3:0)	Decision (Unanimous)
D (2:1)	Decision (Split)
KO	Knockout

== See also ==
- List of WAKO Amateur World Championships
- List of WAKO Amateur European Championships
- List of male kickboxers
