= Yang Guang (disambiguation) =

Yang Guang (569–618), or Emperor Yang of Sui, was the second emperor of the Sui dynasty.

Yang Guang may also refer to:

- Yeung Kwong (1926–2015), Hong Kong pro-Communist activist
- Yang Guang (mezzo-soprano), Chinese mezzo-soprano
- Yang Guang (giant panda), giant panda in Edinburgh Zoo

== Sportspeople ==
- Yang Guang (hurdler) (born 1963), Chinese hurdler
- Yang Guang (ski jumper) (born 1984), Chinese ski jumper

== See also ==
- Yangguang, a town in Tonghai County, Yunnan, China
- Yang Gang (disambiguation)
