= WAKO Pro World Grand Prix =

- Formation: 1991
- Type: Federation of national associations
- Headquarters: Italy
- Location: Monza, Monza and Brianza, Lombardy
- Region served: Worldwide
- Members: National association
- Official language: English
- President: Ennio Falsoni
- Website: http://www.wakopro.org/en/

WAKO Pro World Grand Prix, was a kickboxing promotion featuring events held in between national teams since 2011 by the WAKO-Pro organization in association with national kickboxing organizations.

== Rules ==
All the tournament fights are conducted under K-1 rules: 3 X 3 rounds with 1 minute break between them. In case of a draw, an extra round will be ordered. Wako-Pro World Grand Prix has five different weight classes: -60 kg, -66.5 kg, -75 kg, -81.5 kg and -94 kg.

== Format ==
The national teams are composed of 5 male fighters each in five weight classes: -60 kg, -66.5 kg, -75 kg, -81.5 kg, -94 kg

== WAKO Pro World Grand Prix Champions ==
Year	Champion	Runner-up
2012	Serbia	Russia

== See also ==
- List of kickboxers
