= World Association of Kickboxing Organizations =

Amateur kickboxing governing body

- Abbreviation: WAKO
- Formation: 1977
- Type: Federation of national associations
- Legal status: Active (as per Swiss Law as founded in Zurich on 6 February 1988)
- Purpose: Global Development and governance of the sport of Kickboxing
- Headquarters: Monza, Italy
- Region served: Worldwide
- Members: National association
- Official language: English
- Affiliations: SportAccord; WADA; International World Games Association
- Website: wako.sport
- Remarks: WAKO was established as "World All Style Karate Organization"

The World Association of Kickboxing Organizations (W.A.K.O or WAKO) is an international kickboxing organization counting over 120 affiliated countries representing all five continents. WAKO is a major governing body of amateur kickboxing and is responsible for the development of kickboxing worldwide. The organization was officially recognized as an official kickboxing governing body by Sport Accord. WAKO is recognized by the Global Association of International Sports Federations (GAISF) and the International Olympic Committee (IOC).

== History ==
In 1977, WAKO was founded in Europe and formulated the rules and regulations acting as the Kickboxing Federation of the World. It was founded by American Kickboxing promoter Mike Anderson, and his friend, German Kickboxing promoter Georg Brueckner. WAKO was officially registered in Zurich, Switzerland and become the largest unified kickboxing organization in the world. In 2006, the International Amateur Kickboxing Sports Association (I.A.K.S.A) and WAKO merged under the umbrella of WAKO, making its acceptance possible by the General Association of International Sports Federations (G.A.I.S.F) as the governing body for the sport of Kickboxing.

WAKO became a member of Sport Accord and was officially recognized as the official Kickboxing governing body by Sport Accord, Olympic Council of Asia, WADA and the International World Games Association. Kickboxing is included in World Combat Games, Asian Indoor Games, and the Martial Arts Games (promoted by OCA) in the 2017 International World Games. WAKO has five continental divisions functioning under the auspices of the WAKO International Federation which are WAKO Europe, WAKO Pan America, WAKO Asia, WAKO Oceania and WAKO Africa. WAKO hosts its ordinary General Assemblies in Antalya, Turkey.

In 1991, WAKO PRO was officially established during a WAKO Board meeting in Spain. After a their career as amateurs in the organization, fighters were now able to continue as professional fighters in WAKO Pro.

=== Olympic recognition ===
On the July 20, 2021, the International Olympic Committee officially recognised kickboxing as an Olympic sport, and recognised WAKO as the world governing body for the sport.

=== Ranking system ===
While WAKO was founded primarily as a competitive sanctioning body, it has maintained a structured technical grading system (consisting of Dan and Kyū levels) since the 1980s. Prior to the 2020s, individual national federations, such as WAKO GB, operated under their own unified syllabi established in the 1990s to standardize technical proficiency across member clubs.

Following the organization's full recognition by the International Olympic Committee (IOC) in 2021, WAKO initiated a global administrative transition scheduled for completion in 2025–2026. This transition involves the implementation of a centralized "Global Athlete ID" and an international grading database to formalize and verify existing historical ranks on a digital platform to meet Olympic standards for transparency and eligibility. This digital "passport" system ensures that black belts recorded as early as the 1980s are retroactively verified within the unified global framework.

The grading structure typically follows a progression of seven to nine colored belts (Kyū) before reaching the black belt (Dan). Advancement through these ranks requires a formal examination involving a "test of knowledge," which evaluates technical execution of punches, kicks, and combinations. Furthermore, the syllabus mandates specific fitness benchmarks and, for intermediate and advanced grades, the completion of controlled sparring rounds to demonstrate practical application under pressure.

== Styles ==
WAKO supports 7 different styles, four on the tatami and three in the ring.

=== Tatami sports ===
==== Musical form ====
A musical form is a staged or imaginary fight against one or more opponents in which the performer uses techniques from Oriental Martial Arts to personally selected music.

==== Point fighting ====
Also known as semi-contact, point fighting is a discipline where two contestants fight with the primary goal of scoring defined points. All strikes are controlled; full force is prohibited.

- Opponents are allowed to hit each other with punches and kicks. Striking is allowed only above the waist.
- Foot sweeps are allowed.
- Elbows and knees are forbidden.
- Clinch fighting and throws are forbidden.

==== Light contact ====
In the past, light contact was seen as an intermediate stage between semi contact and full contact kickboxing. Modern Light Contact has evolved into its own unique style of fast and dynamic continuous kickboxing. Unlike Point Fighting, athletes will fight continuously amassing scores over 3x2 minute rounds. All strikes are controlled; full force is prohibited.

- Opponents are allowed to hit each other with punches and kicks. Striking is permitted above the waist and below ankle/mid-calf.
- Foot sweeps are allowed.
- Elbows and knees are forbidden.
- Clinch fighting and throws are forbidden.

==== Kick-light ====
Kick-light is an intermediate stage between semi-kick and low-kick kickboxing. All strikes are controlled; full force is prohibited.

- Opponents are allowed to hit each other with punches and kicks. Kicks striking the thigh (only from outside to inside and vice versa) are permitted.
- Foot sweeps are allowed.
- Elbows and knees are forbidden.
- Clinch fighting and throws forbidden.

=== Ring sports ===
==== Full contact ====
Full contact is a discipline of kickboxing where the intention is to mimic the pressure felt during a real fight.

- Opponents are allowed to hit each other with punches and kicks, striking above the waist and below the ankle/mid-calf.
- Foot sweeps are allowed.
- Elbows and knees are forbidden.
- Clinch fighting and throws are forbidden.

==== Low-kick ====
In low-kick Kickboxing, there is the possibility of attacking the opponent's legs with clean kicks.

- Opponents are allowed to hit each other with punches and kicks, striking the thigh (only from outside to inside and vice versa) which can be attacked using the shin.
- Foot sweeps are allowed.
- Elbows and knees are forbidden.
- Clinch fighting and throws forbidden.

==== K1-style ====
- Opponents are allowed to hit each other with punches, knees and kicks. Legs and any other part of the body can be attacked using the shin.
- Foot sweeps are forbidden.
- Elbows are forbidden.
- Throws are forbidden.
- Clinching must be less than 5 seconds. Kickboxers are allowed to hold the opponent's neck with both hands in order to attack only with the knee and are only allowed one knee strike per clinch.

== Competitions ==
WAKO holds a world championship every two years, with youth (18 and under) and adult (18–45) championships in separate years; only national teams are accepted. Each member country can present only one competitor in each weight class. Competitors are commonly the national champion of their weight class in that particular Kickboxing style and many are also officially recognized by their National Olympic Committees or Ministry of Sports.

WAKO Kickboxing was one of thirteen combat sports participating in the first Combat Games being held in Beijing, China under the patronage of the IOC and SportAccord. WAKO participated in the World Combat Games in St. Petersburg, Russia in September 2013, under the patronage of the IOC and SportAccord. There were three styles at the Combat Games: Low Kick, Points Fighting (formally called Semi Contact), and Full Contact.

== K-1 Rules World Champions ==
The list includes Wako Pro K-1 Rules world title holders. (title defenses are not included).

(Thai Boxing titles until 2007 (not to be confused with Muay Thai titles)

=== Super Heavyweight ===
- Mark Russell - 2003 Defeats Sinisa Andrejasvic; renamed K-1 Rules title in 07; still listed as champion as of 07-06-12.
- Djamal Kasymov - 2007
- Sebastien Van Thielen - 2009 Defeats Paolo Reverberi.
- Vladimir Mineev - 2009 Defeats Sergey Zelinskiy
- Freddy Kemayo - 2013 Defeats Dino Belošević
- Petr Vondráček - 2014 Defeats Nicolas Vermont
- Daniel Skvor - 2017 Defeats Stefan Andjelkovic.
- Roman Kryklia - 2018
- Tomáš Hron - 2019 Defeats Michal Blawdziewicz.

=== Cruiserweight ===
- Kirkwood Walker - 1997
- Musashi (kickboxer) (Mori Akio) - 1999
- Duncan Airlie James (Duncan Campbell) - 2003 Defeats Angelo Grenata

=== Heavyweight ===
- Guy N'Guessan - 2006 Defeats Patrice Quarteron.
- Clei Silva - 2010 Defeats António Sousa;

=== Light Cruiserweight ===
- Ivica Tekic - 2005 Still champion as of 06-05-16; renamed K-1 Rules title in 07; vacant as of 07-06-12.
- Alex McKenzie - 2008
- Horace Martin - 2011 Defeats Andrei Manhole
- Gabriele Casella - 2016 Defeats Gregory Grossi
- Elijah Bokeli - 2021 Defeats Samuel Dbili
- Bilal Bakhouche-Chareuf - 2022 Defeats Mohamed Hamdi.

=== Light Heavyweight ===
- Andre Mannaart - 1997 Defeats Franz Haller.
- Franz Haller - 1997
- Sissoko Moussa - 2005 Renamed K-1 Rules title in 07; still listed as champion as of 07-06-12.
- Federico Spitaletto - 2011
- Nicola Gallo - 2013 Defeats Sidney Mokgolo
- Cédric Tousch -2016 Defeats Aleksandar Petrov
- Elijah Bokeli - 2017 Defeats Alexandar Petrov for the vacant title.
- Alexandar Mekovic - 2020
- Sergej Braun - 2021

=== Super Middleweight ===
- Cosmo Alexandre - 2010 Defeats Dmitry Shakuta
- Datsi Datsiev - 2014 Defeats Thiago Michel.
- Yohan Lidon - 2016
- Aleksandr Menkovic - 2017 Defeats Cristian Torres
- Nikola Todorovic - 2021 Defeats Zakaria Laaouatni.

=== Middleweight ===
- Habib Gadjiev - 2005 Renamed K-1 Rules title in 07; vacant in 08.
- Mohamed Rahhaoui - 2008 Defeats Ricardo Fernandes
- Arnaldo Silva - 2009 Defeats Dennis Schneidmiller
- Mohamed Rahhaoui - 2011
- Yuri Bessmertny - 2013 Defeats Aleksandr Zakharov
- Cédric Doumbé - 2016 Defeats Ljubo Jalovi; starts competing exclusively for Glory in 16-12; officially vacant sometime in 19.
- Alexandr Zakharov - 2019 Defeats Zakaria Laaouatni
- Davide Armanini - 2021 Defeats Maikel Astur.

=== Light Middleweight ===
- Dmitry Shakuta - 2001 Defeats Winston Walker; vacates in 01.
- Christian Daghio - 2001 Defeats Mario Prinks.
- Matteo Sciacca - 2005 Still champion as of 06-04-10; vacant as of 06-05-16.
- Fabrizio Bergamini - 2007 Defeats Frane Radnić.
- Frane Radnić - 2008 Defeats Foad Sadeghi.
- Bruno Franchi - 2009
- Frane Radnić - 2009 Vacant in 10 (sometime after 10-03-27).
- Arnaldo Silva - 2010 Defeats Bruno Franchi
- Chingiz Allazov - 2015 Defeats Djimé Coulibaly; moves down to the super welterweight division in 16.
- Youssef Boughanem - 2016 Defeats Armen Petrosyan (kickboxer) for the vacant title; vacant in 16.
- Vladimir Vulev - 2016 Defeats Maksim Kolpak; vacates in 19-04 (Topsport).
- Atanas Bojilov - 2019 Defeats Maxim Spodarenko; vacant in 22-11 after Bojilov retires.
- Ziga Pecnik - 2022 Defeats Alessio Zeloni.

=== Super Welterweight ===
- Sofiane Allouache - 2003
- Peter Crooke - 2005 Renamed K-1 Rules title in 07
- Sofiane Allouache - 2008 Defeats Eric
- Abraham Roqueñi - 2011
- Chingiz Allazov - 2016 Defeats Enriko Kehl; vacant in 19.
- Georgian Cimpeanu -2019 Defeats Urlich Marvin for the vacant title; vacant in 22.
- Sergio Sanchez - 2022 Defeats Vinicius Bereta.

=== Welterweight ===
- Kieran Keddle - 2002 Defeats Lee Chesters.
- Neil Woods - 2005 Renamed K-1 Rules title in 07; still listed as champion as of 11-08-01; vacant in 11.
- Diogo Neves - 2011 Defeats Ionuţ Atodiresei for the vacant title.
- Alessandro Campagna - 2012-04-16 Defeats Luciano Boinha; still champion as of 12-07-10; vacant as of 13-07-01 and 14-03-03.
- Dylan Salvador 2016 Defeats Aleksei Fedoseev.
- Mohamed Galaoui - 2019 Defeats Andre Santos for the vacant title; vacant in 22.
- Andre Santos - 2022 Defeats Luca Mameli.

=== Light Welterweight ===
- Mohammed Hamjed - 2005 Renamed K-1 Rules title in 07; still listed as champion as of 08-07-07.
- Michele Iezzi - 2011
- Aitor Eguzkiza - 2012
- Ionuţ Atodiresei - 2012
- Eddy Nait-Slimani - 2017 Defeats Antoine Habash
- Václav Sivák - 2021 Defeats Fouad Djebari.

=== Super Lightweight ===
- Mojahid Mohammed - 2005 Sometime between 05-03-30 and 05-11-23; renamed K-1 Rules title in 07; still listed as champion as of 11-08-01.
- Ruben Almeida - 2012 Defeats Javier Hernandez; still champion as of 20-02-26; vacant as of 22-04-01.
- Remi Parra - 2022 Defeats Hicham Moujtahid

=== Lightweight ===
- Mario Donnarumma - 2005 Still champion as of 07-06-12; renamed K-1 Rules title in 07; vacant as of 08-07-07.
- Milos Anic - 2011
- Antoine Habash - 2013
- Silviu Vitez - 2022 Defeats Fabio Lois.

=== Featherweight ===
- Deucélio Rodrigues - 2005 Defeats Tiago Pereira for Thai Boxing Title; renamed K-1 title in 07.
- Luca Ceccheti - 2017 Defeats Tito Macias.
- Astemir Borsov - 2019

=== Bantamweight ===
- Deucélio Rodrigues - 2014 Defeats Albert Tapia
- Giovanni Gross - 2017 Defeats Elshad Alaskarov
- Luca Cecchetti 2022 Defeats Kazaku Maxim.

=== Flyweight ===
- Fernando Macado - 2009 Defeats Gianpietro Marceddu
- Astemir Borsov - 2017 Defeats Lucien Gross; vacant as of 20-02-26.

== Muay Thai World Champions ==
The list includes Wako Pro Muay Thai world champions. (title defenses are not included).

(Not to be confused with "Thai Boxing" titles which became K-1 rules titles in 2007)

=== Super Heavyweight ===
- Gordon Minors - 1998
- Mike Bernardo - 1998
- Sam Greco - 1999
- Danielle Petroni - 2003

=== Cruiser Weight ===
- Kirkwood Walker - 1997< Billed as heavyweight title.
- Musashi (Mori Akio) - 1999
- Duncan Airlie James (Duncan Campbell) - 2003 Defeats Angelo Grenata; retires in 06.

=== Heavyweight ===
- Guy N'Guessan - 2006 Defeats Patrice Quarteron.
- Clei Silva - 2010 Defeats António Sousa; still champion as of 13-08-29; division retired in 14.

=== Light Cruiserweight ===
- Baou Hassan / Francis - 2006

=== Light Heavyweight ===
- Maksutay Azem - 2003

=== Super Middleweight ===
- Manson Gibson
- Moussa Konate (kickboxer) - 2008

=== Middleweight ===
- Alexei Arkhevic 2003
- Dmitry Valent - 2007 Defeats Fabio Siciliano
- Jaochalam Chatjanokgym - 2009 Defeats Nicolas Germain.
- Dmitry Valent - 2011 Still champion as of 13-08-29; division retired in 14.

=== Light Middleweight ===
- Sofiane Allouache - 2003
- Diego Calzolari - 2007
- Basha Valon - 2008 Defeats Steeve Valente.
- Farid Villaume - 2008
- Fabio Siciliani - 2009 Defeats Ante Lucic.
- Farid Villaume - 2009
- Mikael François 2011 Still champion as of 13-08-29; division retired in 14.

=== Super Welterweight ===
- Kevin Harper - 2003
- Thuanthong Pumphanmuang - 2008 Defeats Cédric Muller for the vacant title.
- Cédric Muller - 2009
- Namsaknoi Yudthagarngamtorn - 2010 Defeats Diego Calzolari.
- Cédric Muller - 2011 Still champion as of 13-08-29; division retired in 14

=== Welterweight ===
- Kerian Keddle - 2003 Still champion as of 07-01-29.
- Tijarti Fikri - 2007
- Soufiane Zridy - 2011-11-26 Defeats Houcine Bennoui; still champion as of 13-08-29; division retired in 14.

=== Light Welterweight ===
- Warren Brown 2003 Still champion as of 07-03-19; vacant in 07.
- Sam Sak Kaoponlek / Prachumwong - 2007 Defeats Redouan Edady; vacant in 13.
- Mohamed Galaoui - 2013-11-09 Defeats Rui Briceno; vacant in 14.
- Dylan Salvador - 2014-04-12 Defeats Amine Attalhaoui for the vacant title; division retired in 14.

=== Super Lightweight ===
- Angelo Campoli - 2011

=== Lightweight ===
- Maeda Kensaku - 2003
- Nuno Neves - 2007

=== Bantamweight ===
- Admin Kacem - 2011

=== Flyweight ===
- Gianpietro Marceddu - 2012

== Full Contact World Champions ==
The list includes full contact world title holders. (title defenses are not included).

=== Super Heavyweight ===
- Paulo Zorello - 1991 Defeats Philippe Coutelas
- Stan Longinidis - 1994
- Duke Roufus - 1995
- Dusko Basrak - 2005
- Alex Melcher - 2007
- Anatoly Nosyrev -2009 Defeats Damir Tovarovich

=== Cruiserweight ===
- Tony Palmore - 1978, Wins the gold medal at WAKO World Heavyweight Championship, defeating Tom Rissman in the final, and is also billed as the world heavyweight champion in professional matches; also defeats PKA champion Demetrius Edwards on 80-10-16 in Miami, FL, USA in what is billed as a match to crown the "undisputed" champion
- Paulo Zorello - 1994 Defeats Neil Singleton
- Dennis Alexio - 1999 Defeats Gordon Minors.
- Michele Di Meo - 2005
- Antonio Sousa - 2012 Defeats Jukka Saarinen
- Eugen Waigel - 2015

=== Heavyweight ===
- Mustafa Lakhsem - 2002
- Simon Gonzales - 2002
- Mustafa Lakhsem - 2004 Defeats Denes Recs.
- Simon Gonzales - 2005
- Mustafa Lakhsem - 2012
- Robert Paulsbyen - 2015 Defeats Konstantin Turshin

=== Light Cruiser Weight ===
- Mustapha Lahksam - 2005
- Mustapha Lahksam - 2006
- Marlon Hunt - 2008 Defeats Christian Di Paulo.
- Sergei Bogdan - 2011
- Ralf Krause - 2011 Defeats Alexey Rybkin.
- Cristian Vedovelli - 2012
- Gerard Debure - 2013
- Bojan Miskovic - 2014 Defeats Marco Deckman
- Viktor Frohlich - 2022 Defeats Lorenzo Giormelli.

=== Light Heavyweight ===
- Marek Piotrowski - 1993 Defeats Michael McDonald (kickboxer)
- Christophe Lartisien - 2005
- Assandro Giordano - 2007
- Ralf Krause - 2008
- Assandro Giordano - 2009
- Christophe Touzeau - 2010
- Viktor Fröhlich - 2016 Defeats Igor Prykhodko

=== Super Middleweight ===
- Francis Kitoko - 2005
- Alessio Rondelli - 2007
- Zsolt Nagy - 2008
- Julio Sanchez - 2008
- Kevin Thomas-Cojean - 2013
- Artur Reis - 2015 Defeats Medhi Lacombe

=== Middleweight ===
- Franz Haller - 1981 Defeats Alfred Tommei.
- Youssef Zenaf - 1984
- Franz Haller - 1993 Defeats Bayram Colak.
- Roberto Cocco - 2005 Defeats Roberto Castro.
- Robert Nowak - 2005
- Azamat Belgibayev - 2008
- Eric Schmitt - 2009
- Abdallah Mabel - 2009
- Lionel Picord - 2009
- Seymen Poskotin - 2009 Defeats Azamat Nurpeissov
- Andreas Lødrup - 2010 Defeats Alpay Kir.
- Fernando Heredia - 2011
- Andreas Lødrup - 2011
- Artur Reis - 2013 Defeats Morgan le Gall
- Jakub Pokusa - 2022 Defeats Raymond Straume.

=== Light Middleweight ===
- Lex Easton - 1999
- Tony Cotte - 2005
- Dominik Haselbeck - 2005 Defeats Eric Schimitt
- Sofiane Allouache - 2008
- Eric Schmitt - 2008
- Christian Kvatningen - 2009
- Eric Schmitt - 2009
- Dominik Haselbeck - 2009 Defeats Gil Silva.
- Thomas Lesage - 2010 Defeats Marco Puggioni
- Alessandro Riguccini - 2010 Defeats Rachid Boumalek
- Wilfried Martin - 2011 Defeats Dan Basema.
- Frederic Ficet - 2013
- Stracanek Gregor -2019
- Akseli Saurama - 2021 Defeats Kian Golpira.

=== Super Welterweight ===
- Thomas Kristiansen - 1999
- Dave Depraeter - 2005
- Dimitri Hait - 2005
- Simone Procaccini - 2006
- Eric Schmidt - 2006
- Bruce Codron - 2007 Defeats Joseph Yaucat-Guendi
- Antonio Narbona - 2008
- Roberto d'Avanzo - 2009
- Vladmir Tarasov - 2010 Defeats Lionel Picord
- Lionel Picord - 2013
- Eduard Bernadou - 2016

=== Welterweight ===
- Kirsten Sven - 2005
- Tiago Vital - 2008
- Mario Stassi - 2008
- Andrea Colantoni - 2010 Defeats Wez Fagan
- Jarkko Jussila - 2014
- Dieter Leclercq - 2016 Defeats Alessandro Patrignani

=== Light Welterweight ===
- Giorgio Perreca - 1989 Defeats János Gönczi; Also said to defend 13 times.
- Angelo Palma - 2005
- Ali Kanfoua - 2007
- Biagio Tralli - 2008
- Denis Lukashov - 2008 Defeats Antoine Richard.
- Sergey Lipinets - 2012
- Damiano Tramontana - 2022 Defeats Wilson Costa for the vacant title.

=== Super Lightweight ===
- Said Boghari - 2005
- Daniel Rasilla - 2006 Christophe Mickeyet
- Giuseppe Di Cuia - 2014 Defeats Zaitsev Vasilii

=== Lightweight ===
- José Pina - 1992 Defeats Osman Egin.
- Ugo Cignone - 1992-07
- Mamoudi Zoubair - 2005
- Rocco Cipriano - 2005 Defeats Gianpaolo Spanu
- Habbani Fouad - 2008
- Habbani Fouad - 2009 Defeats Kornel Sandor for the vacant title.
- Sabar Abdelaziz - 2010 Defeats Daniel Martins.
- Kamel Bacha - 2011 Defeats Roberto Pizzagall

=== Featherweight ===
- Gianpaolo Spanu - 2005
- Daniel Martins - 2006
- Johannes Wolf - 2011

=== Bantamweight ===
- Habbani Fouad - 2005
- Ilnaz Sayfullin - 2015 Defeats Marco Villio Atzori.

=== Flyweight ===
- Francesco DeLuca - 2005
- Sergey Cherkassy - 2007
- Alexey Trifonov - 2016 Defeats Jérôme Ardissone

=== Atomweight ===
- Thierry Franzoni - 2001 Defeats David Oltvanyi
- Fabien Saby - 2011 Defeats Ivan Sciolla
- Ivan Sciolla - 2012 Defeats Peryt Wojchiech

=== Women's Cruiser Heavyweight ===
- Cathy Le Mée - 2019

=== Women’s Heavyweight ===
- Cathy Le Mée - 2016 Defeats Laura Burnett

=== Women's Light Heavyweight ===
Originally billed as the super welterweight title (68kg). Division later renamed light heavyweight

- Siren Søraas - 2005
- Kerry-Louise Norbury - 2007
- Caroline Ek - 2009 Defeats Joana Rodrigues
- Birgit Oksnes - 2015 Defeats Ksenia Miroshnichenko.
- Cristina Caruso - 2017 Division renamed light heavyweight

=== Women’s Middleweight ===
- Nicole Trimmel - 2009 Defeats Silvia Carla

=== Women’s Super Welterweight ===
- Siren Soraas - 2005

=== Women’s Welterweight ===
Billed as the super lightweight title (62kg) until 2017-05.

- Julya Kiblawi - 2004-04-29 Welterweight title with 64kg limit; still champion as of 05-06-07; the 64kg division retired in sometime before 06-05-02; welterweight division (66kg) is listed as vacant as of 06-05-02 and 07-06-18.
- Sanja Stunja - 2005 Super lightweight champion (62kg); still champion as of 07-09-15.
- Julia Irmen - 2009 Defeats Barbara Seweryn.
- Olja Žerajić - 2010 62kg division renamed welterweight in 2017.

=== Women’s Lightweight ===
- Svetlana Linovieva - 2005
- Thea Therese Næss - 2010 Defeats Barbara Plazzoli.

=== Women’s Super Featherweight ===
- Olja Žerajić - 2009 Defeats Tsvetomira Pandova

=== Women Featherweight ===
- Barbara Plazzoli - 2004
- Tonje Sørlie - 2012 Defeats Federica Bozzurra
- Renata Rakoczi - 2018 Defeats Kristin Vollstadt.

=== Women’s Super Bantamweight ===
- Mette Solli - 2005

=== Women’s Bantamweight ===
- Oxana Vassileva - 2005

=== Women’s Super Flyweight ===
- Akyuz Fatma - 2005
- Tatiana Rinaldi - 2007

=== Women’s Flyweight ===
- Valeria Calabrese - 2006
- Yulia Staforkina - 2016 Defeats Amadine Mudry; division retired in 2017

== Sponsors ==
The World Association of Kickboxing Organizations on Monza, February 6, 2020, signed contracts with two sponsors for the next four years concerning its protecting equipment and clothing. The winning proposal came from Top Ten and Adidas Kickboxing, two worldwide brands within the sports market.

== See also ==
- List of WAKO Amateur World Championships
- List of WAKO Amateur European Championships
- Wako-Pro World Grand Prix
- List of male kickboxers
- List of female kickboxers
- World Kickboxing Association
